= Aurore Delplace =

Belgian singer, dancer and actress

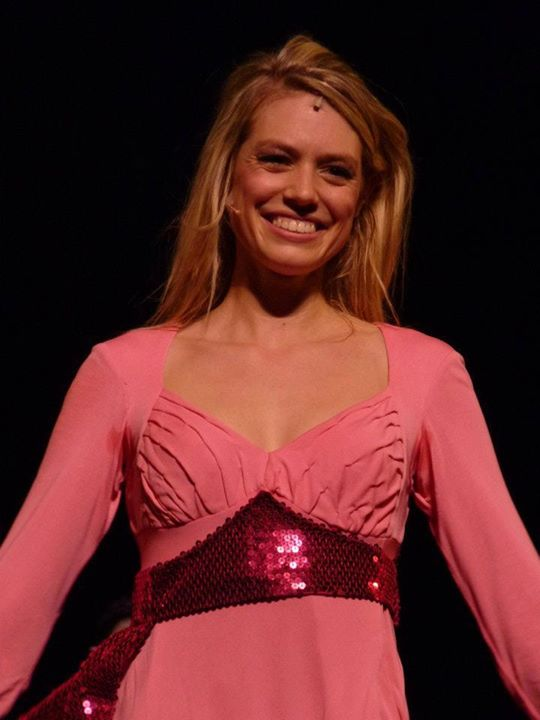
- Aurore Delplace in Legally Blonde in 2012.
- Born: 28 July 1986 (age 39); Brussels, Belgium
- Occupations: Singer, dancer, actress
- Years active: 2008–present
- Spouse: Kevin Levy (2023–present)

Aurore Delplace (born 28 July 1986) is a Belgian singer, dancer and actress.

== Life and career ==
Aurore Delplace was born in Brussels. She took dance classes at an early age and joined the Royal Academy of Fine Arts in Brussels with an option in classical and contemporary dance, where she graduated. She moved to Paris in 2008 and joined the International Academy of Musical Comedy.

She obtained her first roles in the musicals Grease, Aladin, Legally Blonde and Cendrillon, le spectacle musical among others. From the latter where she held the leading role were released an album, a DVD and a single titled "On aime tous un jour" performed by her.

She then played in various operettas with the same cast. She first portrayed Sylvabelle in early 2011 in The White Horse Inn by Ralph Benatzky, Erik Charell and Hans Müller. In early 2012, she played in the operettas La Route fleurie by Francis Lopez and Raymond Vincy, and Un de la Canebière by Henri Alibert, René Sarvil and Vincent Scotto. Later the same year, she also played in The Merry Widow by Franz Lehár, Viktor Léon and Leo Stein.

In 2013, while she almost obtained the leading role for the series Dreams : 1 rêve, 2 vies, Aurore Delplace participated at the second season of the contest The Voice: la plus belle voix and joined the team of Louis Bertignac. She was eliminated at the primes. After the program, she was chosen to perform the generic of the animated series Maya the Honey Bee and joined the musicals Salut les copains and Love Circus.

Second collaboration with Studio 100 after Maya the Honey Bee, Aurore Delplace is the singing voice of Kate in 2015 in the animated series K3. The same year, she portrayed Geneviève Dixmer in the musical Marie-Antoinette et le Chevalier de Maison-Rouge by Didier Barbelivien where the performances began in autumn 2016. In November 2015, she is in charge of the animation and singing of the television program Folie passagère of Frédéric Lopez on France 2.

In 2019, she played a new role in the television series Un si grand soleil broadcast on France 2, starting from episode number 228. She portrayed the role of the lawyer Johanna Lemeur.

In August 2025, she participated as a contestant in an episode of the game show Fort Boyard for the Grégory Lemarchal foundation.

== Musicals and operettas ==
- 2008–2009 : Grease by Jim Jacobs, French adaptation, Théâtre Libre, Palais des congrès de Paris
- 2009–2010 : Aladin, touring of the Zéniths
- 2009–2011 : Cendrillon, le spectacle musical, Théâtre Mogador
- 2010–2011 : Mike, laisse nous t'aimer, Théâtre Libre
- 2011 : The White Horse Inn by Ralph Benatzky, Erik Charell et Hans Müller, Opéra de Reims
- 2011 : 1939 by Stéphane Métro and Christophe Borie, Théâtre du Gymnase Marie Bell
- 2012 : La Route fleurie by Francis Lopez and Raymond Vincy, Opéra de Massy
- 2012 : Un de la Canebière by Henri Alibert, René Sarvil and Vincent Scotto, Opéra de Reims
- 2012 : Legally Blonde by Laurence O'Keefe, Nell Benjamin and Heather Hach, Le Palace
- 2012 : The Merry Widow by Franz Lehár, Victor Léon and Leo Stein
- 2013–2014 : Salut les copains by Pascal Forneri, Folies Bergère, touring
- 2013–2014 : Robin des Bois by Lionel Florence and Patrice Guirao, Palais des congrès de Paris, touring
- 2014–2016 : Love Circus by Agnès Boury and Stéphane Laporte, Folies Bergère
- 2016 : Marie-Antoinette et le Chevalier de Maison-Rouge by Didier Barbelivien, Tony Meggiorin and Antoine Rault
- 2016 : Flashdance by Thomas Hedley and Robert Cary, Dôme de Paris and touring

== Filmography ==
- 2008 : Ben et Thomas as Élise Rosenberg
- 2012 : Faut pas pousser
- 2014 : Yves Saint Laurent as the coterie and the models
- 2015 : Joséphine, Guardian Angel as Alice Vignault (season 16, episode 1)
- 2015 : K3 as Kate (sung voice)
- 2016 : Section de recherches as Gladys (season 10, episode 5)
- 2019–present : Un si grand soleil as Johanna Lemeur
- 2022 : La Vengeance sans visage as Marie-Alice Delorme (TV film)
- 2022 : Camping Paradis as Camille (season 13, episode 2)
- 2023 : Simon Coleman as Jade and Morgane Samson (season 1, episode 2)

== Discography ==
- 2009 : Cendrillon, le spectacle musical
- 2011 : Pinocchio, la renaissance (EP)
- 2015 : Marie-Antoinette et le Chevalier de Maison-Rouge

== See also ==
- The Voice: la plus belle voix season 2
