= Édouard Delmont =

French actor (1883–1955)

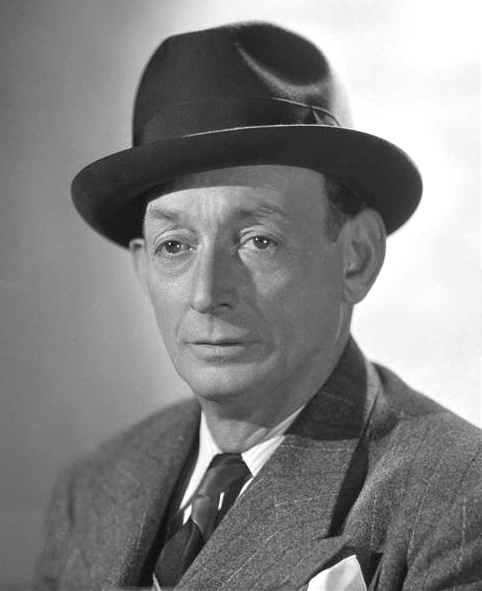
- Born: Édouard Marius Autran; 5 December 1883; Marseille, France
- Died: 22 November 1955 (aged 71); Cannes, France
- Occupation: Actor

Édouard Delmont (5 December 1883 – 22 November 1955) was a French actor born Édouard Marius Autran in Marseille. He died in Cannes at age 72.

== Filmography ==
- 1930 : L'Arlésienne by Jacques de Baroncelli
- 1930 : Maison de danses by Maurice Tourneur
- 1931 : Mardi gras by Pierre Weill
- 1931 : Marius by Alexander Korda
- 1931 : Mam'zelle Nitouche, by Marc Allégret, Le directeur du music-hall
- 1932 : Fanny by Marc Allégret, Le docteur Félicien Venelle
- 1932 : Amour et Biceps (short film) by Jack Windrow
- 1933 : Roger la Honte by Gaston Roudès, L'inspecteur
- 1933 : Au pays du soleil (operetta) by Robert Péguy
- 1933 : Jofroi by Marcel Pagnol
- 1933 : The Illustrious Maurin by André Hugon
- 1933 : Chourinette by André Hugon
- 1934 : Angèle by Marcel Pagnol, Amédée
- 1934 : Le Train de 8 heures 47, L'éteigneur de réverbères
- 1934 : Les Bleus de la marine by Maurice Cammage, Le quartier-maître
- 1935 : Toni or Les Amours de Toni by Jean Renoir, Fernand
- 1935 : Le Gros Lot de Cornembuis (short film) by André Hugon, Bolduc
- 1936 : César by Marcel Pagnol, Le docteur Félicien Venelle
- 1936 : Romarin by Pierre Caron
- 1936 : Blanchette by André Hugon, Le docteur Bonenfant
- 1936 : Joseph, tu m'énerves!! (short film) by Georges Winter
- 1937 : Regain by Marcel Pagnol, Le père Gaubert
- 1937 : The Secrets of the Red Sea by Richard Pottier
- 1937 : The Strange Monsieur Victor by Jean Grémillon, Paroli
- 1937 : Le Chanteur de minuit by Léo Joannon, Fontana ? or Patard ?
- 1937 : Franco de port by Dimitri Kirsanoff
- 1937 : Balthazar by Pierre Colombier, Balicot
- 1938 : Hercule by Alexander Esway
- 1938 : La Marseillaise by Jean Renoir, Cabri, le paysan
- 1938 : Port of Shadows by Marcel Carné, Panama
- 1938 : La Femme du boulanger by Marcel Pagnol, Maillefer
- 1938 : Le Club des fadas by Émile Couzinet
- 1938 : The Little Thing by Maurice Cloche, L'abbé Germane
- 1938 : Firmin le muet de Saint-Pataclet by Jacques Séverac, Toinet
- 1938 : Farinet ou l'or dans la montagne by Max Haufler : Fontana
- 1938 : Heroes of the Marne by André Hugon, Le père Bardin
- 1939 : Berlingot and Company by Fernand Rivers, Courtepatte
- 1939 : Le Déserteur or Je t'attendrai by Léonide Moguy, Le père, M. Marchand
- 1939 : Le Paradis des voleurs (Escapade) by L.-C. Marsoudet and Léo Joannon, L'oncle Roquefigue
- 1940 : The Mondesir Heir by Albert Valentin, Firmin
- 1940 : The Marvelous Night by Jean-Paul Paulin, Le vieux berger
- 1941 : Three Argentines in Montmartre by André Hugon, Sacrifice
- 1941 : Notre-Dame de la Mouise by Robert Péguy, Le père Didier
- 1941 : Parade en sept nuits by Marc Allégret, Long-Pendu
- 1942 : Soyez les bienvenus by Jacques de Baroncelli
- 1942 : L'Arlésienne by Marc Allégret, Le berger Balthazar
- 1941 : The Italian Straw Hat
- 1942 : Simplet by Fernandel
- 1942 : Cap au large by Jean-Paul Paulin
- 1942 : Feu sacré by Maurice Cloche, Papa Bricard
- 1943 : A Woman in the Night by Edmond T. Gréville
- 1943 : Le soleil a toujours raison by Pierre Billon
- 1943 : Home Port by Jean Choux
- 1943 : Picpus by Richard Pottier
- 1943 : The Lucky Star by Jean Boyer
- 1943 : A Dog's Life by Maurice Cammage
- 1943 : Adieu Léonard by Pierre Prévert
- 1943 : Le Val d'enfer by Maurice Tourneur
- 1943 : Mon amour est près de toi by Richard Pottier
- 1944 : Un chapeau de paille d'Italie by Maurice Cammage (filmed in 1940)
- 1944 : The Ménard Collection by Bernard Roland
- 1944 : The Island of Love by Maurice Cam
- 1945 : La Fiancée des ténèbres by Serge de Poligny
- 1945 : Solita de Cordoue by Willy Rozier
- 1946 : The Grand Hotel Affair by André Hugon
- 1946 : Le Gardian by Jean de Marguenat
- 1946 : La Nuit sans fin by Jacques Séverac
- 1946 : Ploum ploum, tra la la by Robert Hennion
- 1947 : The Renegade by Jacques Séverac
- 1947 : Le Destin exécrable de Guillemette Babin by Guillaume Radot
- 1947 : Le Dessous des cartes by André Cayatte
- 1948 : Colomba by Émile Couzinet
- 1948 : Buffalo Bill et la bergère by Serge de La Roche (unfinished film)
- 1948 : Bagarres by Henri Calef
- 1949 : Passion for Life by Jean-Paul Le Chanois
- 1949 : The Man Who Returns from Afar by Jean Castanier
- 1949 : Les Eaux troubles by Henri Calef
- 1949 : Two Loves by Richard Pottier
- 1950 : The Inn of Sin by Jean de Marguenat
- 1950 : Le Grand Cirque by Georges Peclet
- 1950 : The Man Who Returns from Afar
- 1950 : Juliette ou la Clé des songes by Marcel Carné
- 1950 : La Belle que voilà by Jean-Paul Le Chanois
- 1951 : Trafic sur les dunes by Jean Gourguet
- 1951 : Monsieur Octave or L'escargot by Maurice Téboul (unreleased film)
- 1951 : Village Feud by Henri Verneuil, Capucet
- 1952 : In the Land of the Sun by Maurice de Canonge
- 1952 : Éternel espoir by Max Joly
- 1952 : Her Last Christmas by Jacques Daniel-Norman
- 1952 : Manon of the Spring by Marcel Pagnol
- 1953 : The Return of Don Camillo by Julien Duvivier
- 1953 : The Call of Destiny by Georges Lacombe
- 1954 : Le Mouton à cinq pattes by Henri Verneuil
- 1954 : Letters from My Windmill by Marcel Pagnol (from the skit Le Secret de maître Cornille and the unpublished skit La Diligence de Beaucaire)
- 1954 : Ali Baba and the Forty Thieves by Jacques Becker, Le père de Morgiane

== Bibliography ==
- Raymond Chirat; Olivier Barrot, Les excentriques du cinéma français : 1929–1958, Paris : Henri Veyrier, 1983. ISBN 978-2-85199-304-5
- Yvan Foucart: Dictionnaire des comédiens français disparus, Mormoiron : Éditions cinéma, 2008, 1185 p. ISBN 978-2-9531-1390-7
