= In the Land of the Sun =

In the Land of the Sun may refer to:

- In the Land of the Sun (1934 film), a French musical comedy crime film
- In the Land of the Sun (1952 film), a French musical comedy film
