= The Two Girls (1951 film) =

1951 film

- Directed by: Maurice de Canonge
- Written by: Jean-Louis Bouquet; Louis Feuillade (novel); René Jeanne; Maurice de Canonge
- Produced by: Georges Bernier
- Starring: Léo Marjane; Suzy Prim; Jean-Jacques Delbo
- Cinematography: Charles Bauer
- Edited by: Louis Devaivre
- Music by: Maurice Yvain
- Production company: Les Films Artistiques
- Distributed by: Les Films Fernand Rivers; Titanus Distribuzione (Italy)
- Release date: 5 April 1951
- Running time: 93 minutes
- Country: France
- Language: French

The Two Girls (French: Les deux gamines) is a 1951 French drama film directed by Maurice de Canonge and starring Léo Marjane, Suzy Prim and Jean-Jacques Delbo. The same story had previously been made into a 1921 silent film of the same title and a 1936 sound film.

The film's sets were designed by the art director Claude Bouxin. It was shot at the Billancourt Studios in Paris.

== Synopsis ==
After it is believed that their mother has been killed in a plane crash, two girls are sent to live with their kindly grandfather but are mistreated by their governess.

== Cast ==
- Léo Marjane as Lise Fleury
- Suzy Prim as Mademoiselle Bénazer
- Jean-Jacques Delbo as Pierre Manin
- René Sarvil as Chambertin
- Denis d'Inès as M. Bertal
- Jean Toulout as M. Bersange
- Georges Tabet as Marco
- Jean Pignol
- Jany Vallières as Mademoiselle Bersange
- Marie-France as Gaby
- Josette Arno as Ginette
- Philippe Mareuil as Philippe
- Renée Thorel as La directrice
- Lydia Zaréna as Lucy Harmon
- Geno Ferny as Gaston
- Robert Noël as Le journaliste
- Émile Ronet as Le photographe
- Nicolas Amato as Le terrassier
- Georgette Anys as La lavandière
- Marcelle Rexiane as Une voisine
- Marcel Melrac as L'agent
- Raymond Soukoff as Un inspecteur
- Pierre Morin as Un inspecteur
- Roger Bontemps as Un inspecteur
- René Hell as Un inspecteur
- Franck Maurice as Un inspecteur

== Bibliography ==
- James L. Limbacher. Haven't I seen you somewhere before?: Remakes, sequels, and series in motion pictures and television, 1896-1978. Pierian Press, 1979.
