= Three Sailors =

Three Sailors (French:Trois de la marine) may refer to:

- Three Sailors (operetta), a 1933 operetta
- Three Sailors (1934 film), a film adaptation
- Three Sailors (1957 film), a film adaptation
