= Happy Arenas =

Happy Arenas may refer to:

- Happy Arenas (1935 film), a French musical comedy film
- Happy Arenas (1958 film), a French musical comedy film
