= Arbus =

Arbus may refer to:

- Arbus, Sardinia, a commune in the province of South Sardinia, Sardinia, Italy.
- Arbus, Pyrénées-Atlantiques, a commune in the department of Pyrénées-Atlantiques in the region of Aquitaine, France.
- Arbus (surname)
