= Réalisation d'art cinématographique =

Réalisation d'art cinématographique (RAC), was a French production company and film distributor, run by Frank Rollmer, Alexandre Pinkéwitch (Pinkévitch), and Albert Pinkéwitch (Pinkévitch). It produced the classic French film Grand Illusion (1937), which was the first ever foreign language film to be nominated for the Academy Award for Best Picture. The nomination officially went to the production company as a whole, because until 1950 the award was not given to individuals.

== Filmography ==
- 1936 : Jenny
- 1937 : La Grande Illusion
- 1938 : Ramuntcho
- 1938 : La Marseillaise
- 1941 : Le Pavillon brûle
- 1942 : La Nuit fantastique
- 1949 : D'homme à hommes
