= David Leon (disambiguation) =

David Leon is an actor.

David Leon may also refer to:

- David Leon (soccer) (born 1987), American soccer player
- David ben Judah Messer Leon (c. 1470–c. 1526), Italian rabbi, physician and writer
- David Ari Leon (born 1967), American composer, musician and music supervisor

== See also ==
- Léon David, French tenor
