= Henry Parayre =

French sculptor

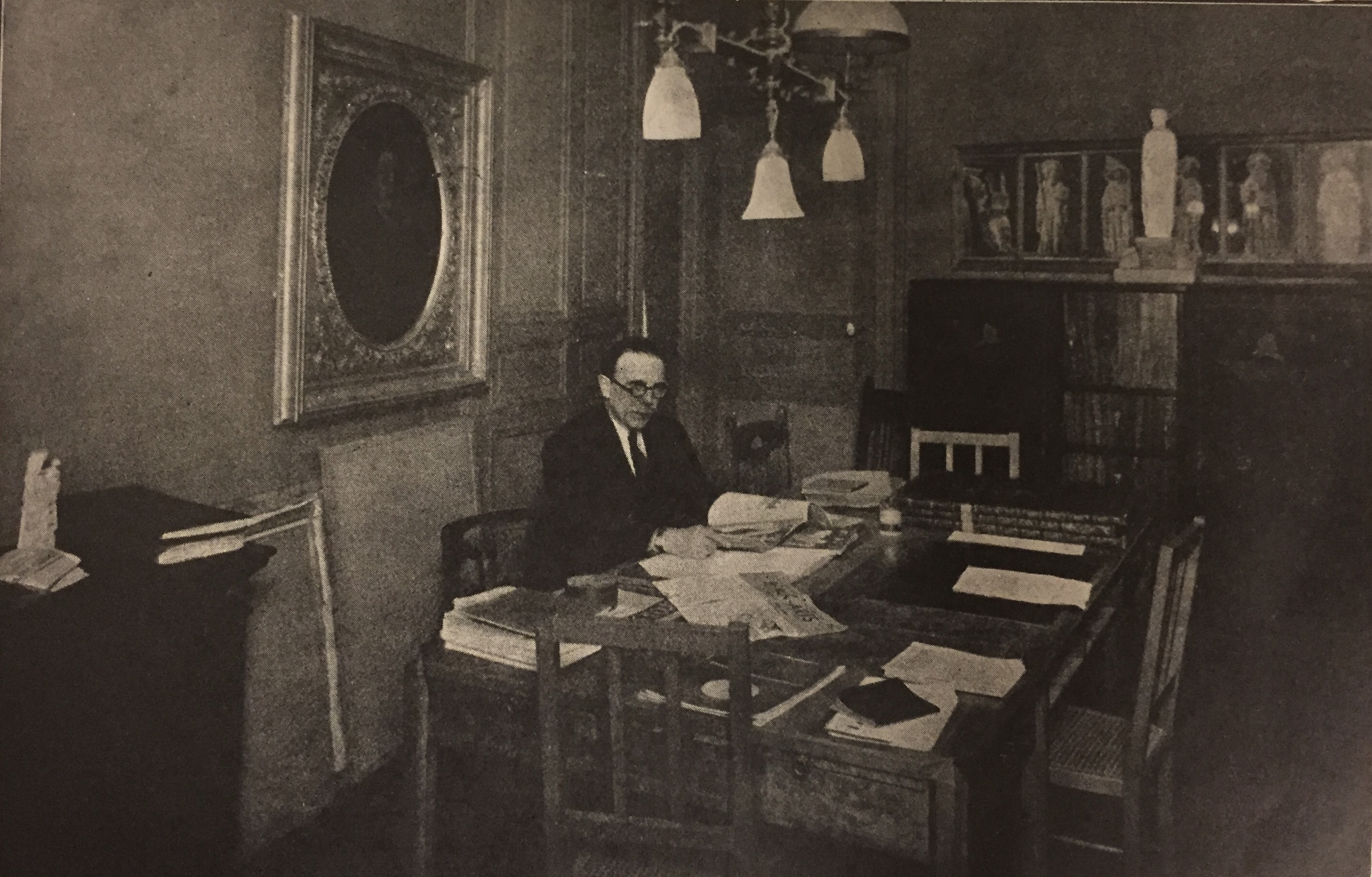
- Henry Parayre in 1937
- Born: July 9, 1879; Toulouse, France
- Died: December 3, 1970 (aged 91); Conques-en-Rouergue, Aveyron, France
- Occupation: Sculptor

Henry Parayre (1879-1970) was a French sculptor.

== Early life ==
Henry Parayre was born on July 9, 1879, in Toulouse, France.

== Career ==
Parayre served as the director of the École des Beaux-Arts in Toulouse. Some of his students included André Arbus and Marc Saint-Saëns.

Parayre designed the monument in honor of the French Resistance in Sainte-Radegonde, Aveyron. He also designed sculptures with his former students, Arbus and Saint-Saëns.

His work is in the permanent collection of the Musée Denys-Puech in Rodez. It can also be found at the Musée du Vieux Toulouse.

== Personal life and death ==
Parayre resided in Conques-en-Rouergue, where he died on December 3, 1970.

== Works ==
- Parayre, Henry (1951). Conques-en-Rouergue... son église, son trésor. Toulouse: Imprimerie du Sud-Ouest. OCLC 465841464.
