= Lily Fayol =

French singer

Lily Fayol (12 June 1914 in Allevard, Isère – 15 May 1999 in Saint-Raphaël, Var) was a French singer.

The artistic career of Lily Fayol began shortly before World War II. Acquainted with talent manager Johnny Stark she had a series of hits from the 1940s including La Guitare à Chiquita, Le gros Bill, Le Régiment des mandolines, Le Chapeau à plume, Les Trois bandits de Napoli, La Cane du Canada, La Bouteille, etc. In 1950 she was the star of the operetta Annie du Far-West alongside Marcel Merkès at the Théâtre du Châtelet. Lily Fayol also starred in several films including La Tournée des Grands-Ducs (1953) and La Gueule de l'autre (1979). She was married to cycling champion Maurice Roux, and became a hotelier with her husband after leaving showbusiness. She died in Saint-Raphaël, Var, on 15 May 1999.

== Filmography ==
- 1946: Monsieur Grégoire Escapes (by Jacques Daniel-Norman) - Bella-May
- 1949: Marlene (by Pierre de Hérain)
- 1953: The Tour of the Grand Dukes (by Norbert Carbonnaux) - Une chanteuse
- 1976: Les Cinq Dernières Minutes (Episode: "Les petits d'une autre planète", by Claude Loursais) - Émilie Bordebure
- 1977: La Nuit, tous les chats sont gris (by Gérard Zingg) - La veuve joyeuse
- 1979: La Gueule de l'autre (by Pierre Tchernia) - La mère de Gisèle / Gisele's mother
- 1980: Le Guignolo (by Georges Lautner) - La Schwartz
- 1980: Médecins de nuit (Episode: "La pension Michel", by Jean-Pierre Prévost) -Eulalie de Sabert
