= Aubusson tapestry =

Tapestry made in central France

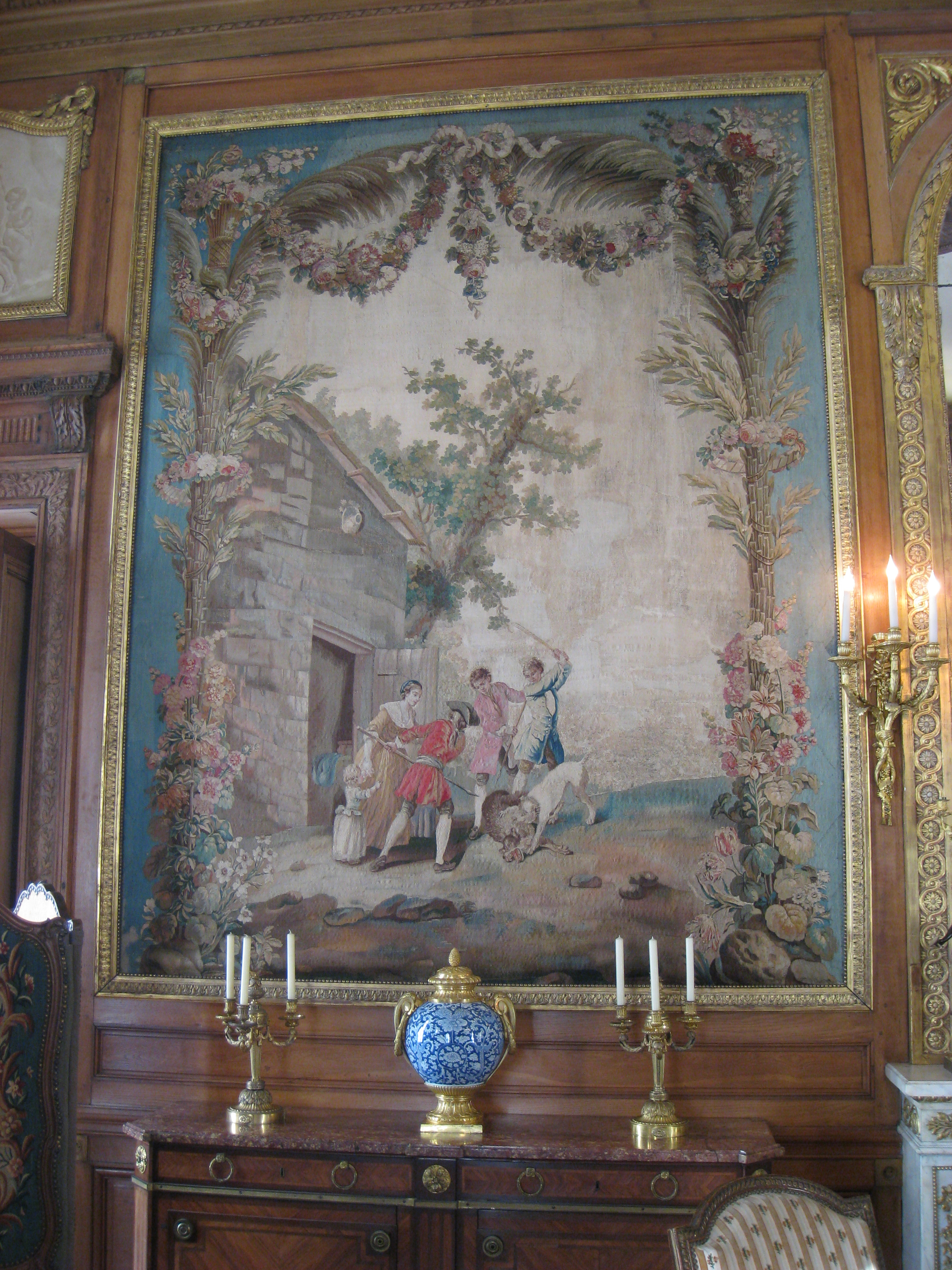
- The Lion in Love (c. 1775–1780), an Aubusson tapestry designed by Jean-Baptiste Oudry, Musée Nissim de Camondo, Paris
- Type: Tapestry
- Production method: Weaving
- Production process: Craft production
- Place of origin: Aubusson, France
- Introduced: 14th century

Aubusson tapestry
- UNESCO Intangible Cultural Heritage
- Country: France
- Reference: 00250
- Region: Europe and North America

Inscription history
- Inscription: 2009 (4th session)
- List: Representative

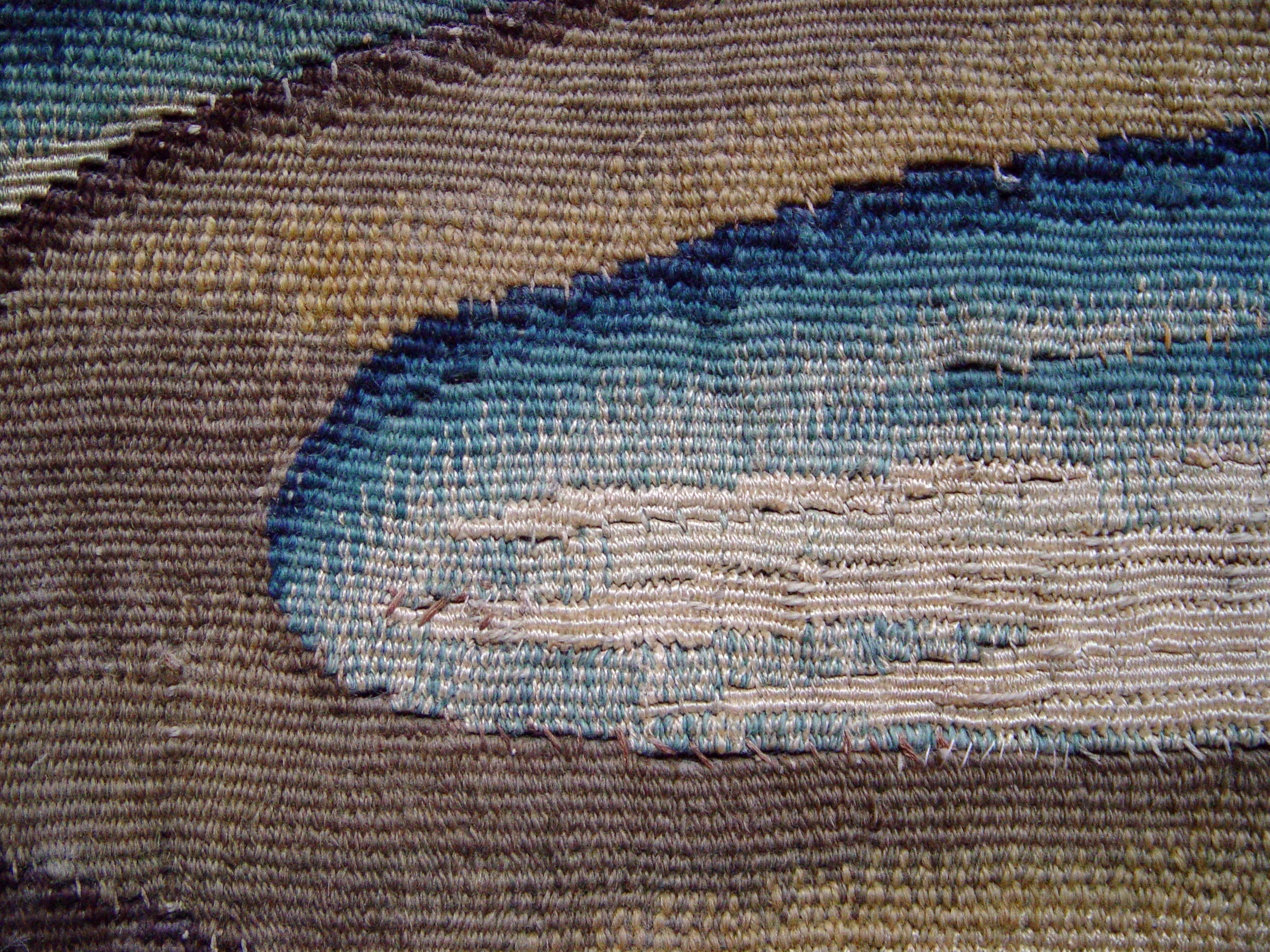
Detail of Naissance de Marie Aubusson tapestry in the cloister of the Church of St. Trophime, Arles

Aubusson tapestry (French: Tapisserie d'Aubusson) is tapestry manufactured at Aubusson, in the upper valley of the Creuse in central France. The term often covers similar products made in the nearby town of Felletin, whose products are often treated as "Aubusson". The industry probably developed soon after 1300 with looms in family workshops, perhaps already run by the Flemings who were noted in documents from the 16th century.

Aubusson tapestry of the 18th century managed to compete with the royal manufacture of Gobelins tapestry and the privileged position of Beauvais tapestry, although generally regarded as not their equal.

In 2009 "Aubusson tapestry" was inscribed on the Representative List of the Intangible Cultural Heritage of Humanity by UNESCO. At that time the industry supported three workshops, and ten or so freelance weavers.

== History ==
Felletin is identified as the source of the Aubusson tapestries in the inventory of Charlotte of Albret, Duchess of Valentinois and widow of Cesare Borgia (1514). The workshops were given a royal charter in 1665, but came into their own in the later 18th century, with designs by François Boucher, Jean-Baptiste Oudry and Jean-Baptiste Huet, many of pastoral rococo subjects. Typically, Aubusson tapestries depended on engravings as a design source, or scale drawings from which the low-warp tapestry-weavers worked. As with Flemish and Parisian tapestries of the same time, figures were set against a conventional background of verdure, stylized foliage and vignettes of plants on which birds perch and from which issue glimpses of towers and towns.

In the 19th century reproductions of pieces from the previous century, and furniture covers, as well as floral tapestry carpets, kept the industry viable, and the town took much of the post-World War II revival in tapestry weaving. In fact the leading designer Jean Lurçat had moved there in September 1939, with Marcel Gromaire and Pierre Dubreuil.

Le Bouquet (1951) by Marc Saint-Saens is among the best and most representative French tapestries of the fifties. It is a tribute to Saint-Saens’s predilection for scenes from nature and rustic life.

The museum of the Cité internationale de la tapisserie) in Aubusson which opened in 2016 has a large collection of Aubusson tapestries.

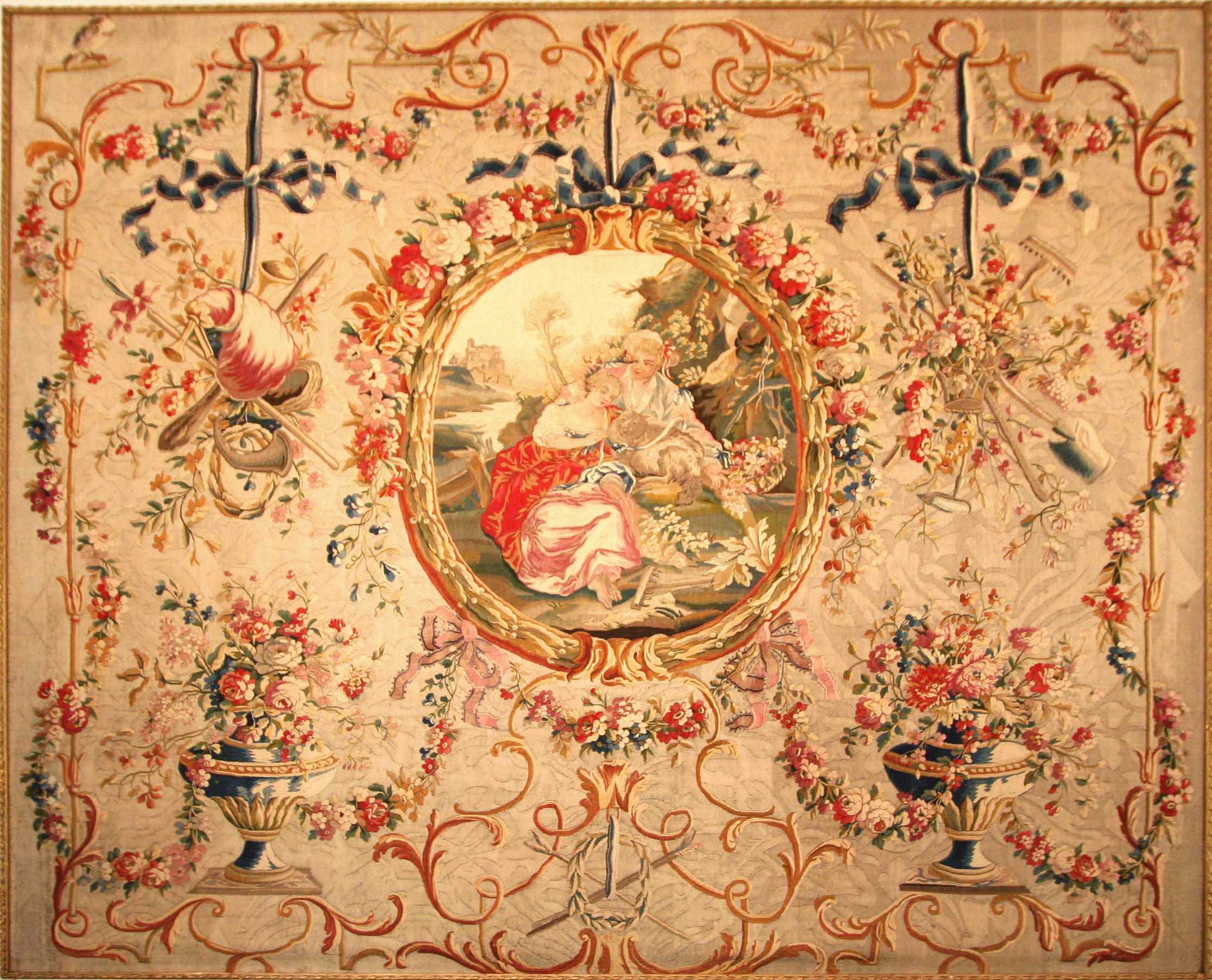
Aubusson tapestry after Jean-Baptiste Huet, c. 1786

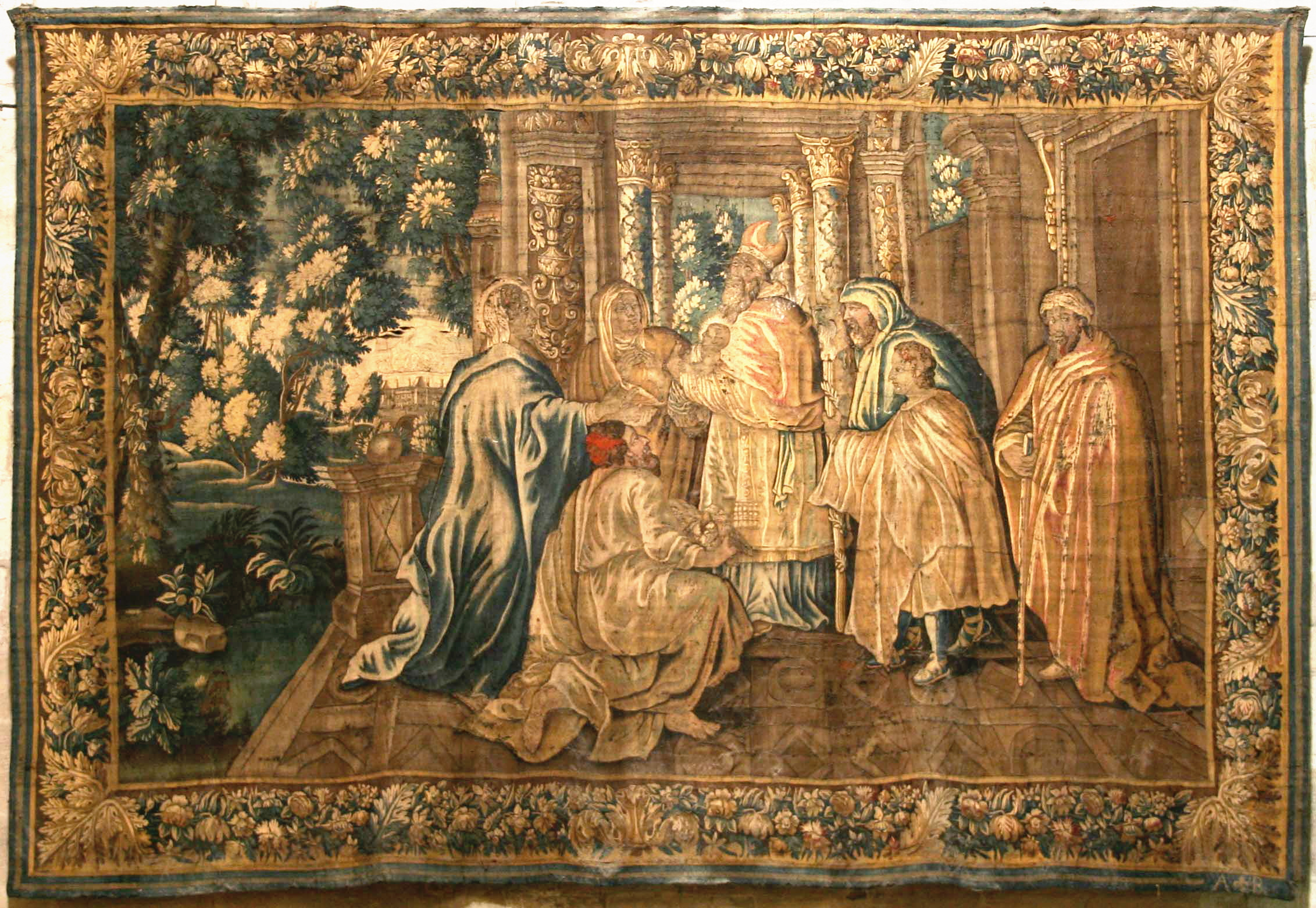
Aubusson tapestry from Arles

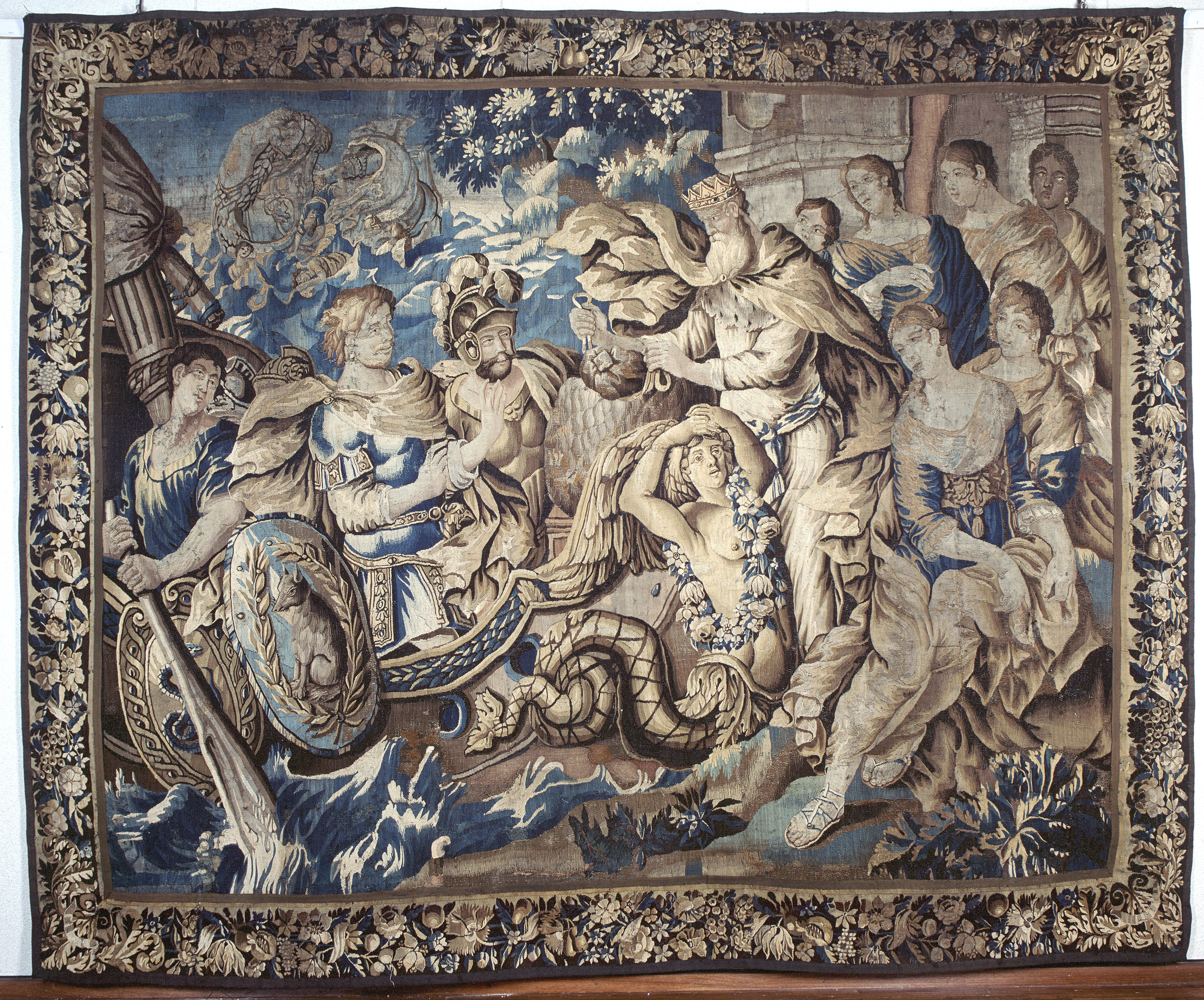
Aubusson tapestry; design by Isaac Moillon at the Cité internationale de la tapisserie), Aubusson

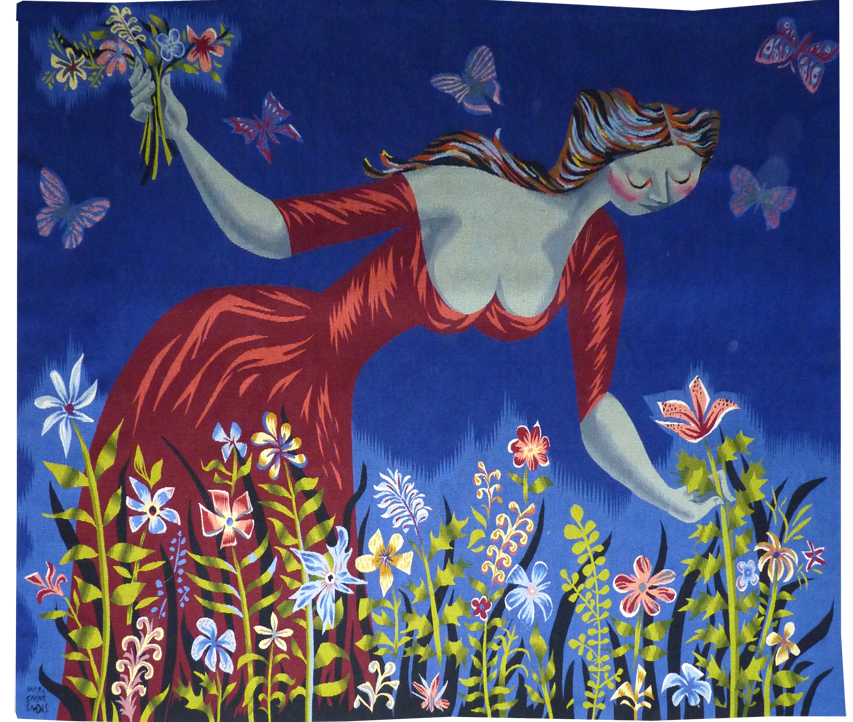
Le Bouquet, by Marc Saint-Saëns, 1951
