= Youth (1934 film) =

1934 film

- Directed by: Georges Lacombe
- Written by: Michel Arnaud
- Starring: Robert Arnoux; Lisette Lanvin; Jean Servais
- Cinematography: Harry Stradling Sr.
- Music by: Georges Van Parys
- Release date: 24 May 1934
- Country: France
- Language: French

Youth (French: Jeunesse) is a 1934 French drama film directed by Georges Lacombe and starring Robert Arnoux, Lisette Lanvin and Jean Servais.

The film's sets were designed by Pierre Schild.

== Cast ==
- Robert Arnoux as Jean
- Lisette Lanvin as Marie
- Jean Servais as Pierre
- Jean-Louis Allibert as Louis
- Paulette Dubost as Gisèle
- Charles Camus as Le père
- Franck Maurice as Le cafetier
- Jane Pierson as La cliente
- Made Siamé as L'infirmière
- Eugène Stuber as Le patron
- Titys as L'ivrogne

== Bibliography ==
- Aitken, Ian. The Concise Routledge Encyclopedia of the Documentary Film. Routledge, 2013.
