= José Luccioni (tenor) =

French opera singer

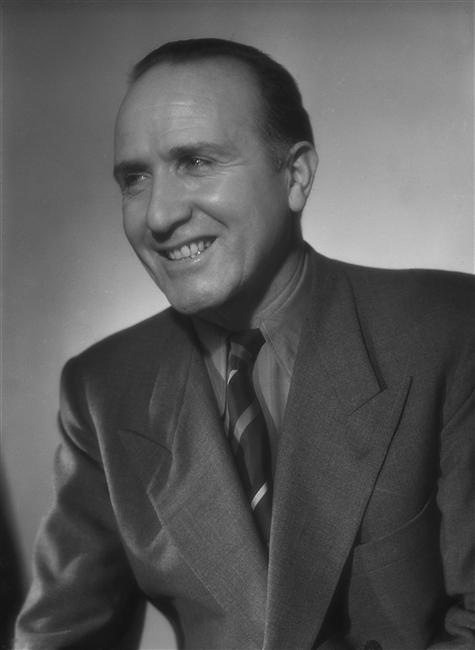
Luccioni Harcourt 1947

José Luccioni (14 October 1903 in Bastia – 5 October 1978 in Marseille) was a French operatic tenor of Corsican origin. He possessed one of the best dramatic voices of the 1930s and 1940s.

Initially a racing car driver and mechanic at the Citroën car company, his voice was discovered while he was serving in the military. He studied singing in Paris with the eminent former tenors Léon David and Léon Escalais and made his debut in Rouen as Cavaradossi in Tosca in 1931. During the 1932-33 season he debuted at both the Palais Garnier and the Opéra-Comique, where he won considerable acclaim as Don José in Carmen, a role he sang an estimated 500 times during his career.

He sang widely in Europe, spending much of 1935-37 in Italy, appearing in Florence, Turin and Verona but mostly at the Rome Opera. He also appeared at the Royal Opera House in London's Covent Garden, the Monte Carlo Opera, the Liceo in Barcelona and other European venues. He made his South American debut at the Teatro Colón in Buenos Aires in 1936, and sang in the United States at the Lyric Opera of Chicago during the 1937-38 season.

Luccioni had an impressively large voice that combined beauty with power, in the tradition of his great French predecessor at the Paris Opéra, Paul Franz (1876–1950). He was also a fine singing-actor. Notable roles of his included Roland, Samson, Vasco, Jean, Turiddu, Canio, Chenier, Radames and Otello. He also appeared in a few motion pictures, including Colomba (1948) and Le bout de la route (1948). After retirement, he served as Director of the Opéra de Nice.

His son, Jacques Luccioni, was also an opera singer, first as a tenor and later as a baritone.

Luccioni died in the South of France shortly before his 75th birthday. He left a sizeable legacy of recordings made during his vocal prime. A wide selection of these recordings are available on CD. They confirm Luccioni's reputation as being one of the finest ever French dramatic tenors.

== Sources ==
- Operissimo.com
