= The Grand Hotel Affair =

1946 film

- Directed by: André Hugon
- Written by: Paul Achard; André Hugon
- Produced by: André Hugon
- Starring: Henri Alibert; Édouard Delmont; Noël Roquevert
- Cinematography: Raymond Agnel
- Edited by: Monique Lacombe
- Music by: Vincent Scotto
- Production company: Productions André Hugon
- Distributed by: Cinéma de France
- Release date: 29 March 1946
- Running time: 90 minutes
- Country: France
- Language: French

The Grand Hotel Affair (French: L'affaire du Grand Hôtel) is a 1946 French comedy mystery film directed by André Hugon and starring Henri Alibert, Édouard Delmont and Noël Roquevert. It was shot at the Marseille Studios of Gaumont and on location around the city.. The film's sets were designed by the art director Gilbert Garcin.

== Synopsis ==
In Marseille, the fisherman Tonin suspects that a group of characters he sees are engaged in smuggling. In fact they turn out to be diving for wreckage, but he is now left wondering if they are involved in a pair of murders committed at the grand hotel.

== Cast ==
- Henri Alibert as Tonin
- Édouard Delmont as Le Marsoin
- Mireille Bard as Nine
- Jacqueline Roman as Régine
- Noël Roquevert as Monsieur Léon
- Léon Belières as Baptiste
- Pierre Palau as Louiset
- Manuel Gary as Justin
- Perchik as Bébert

== Bibliography ==
- Bessy, Maurice & Chirat, Raymond. Histoire du cinéma français: encyclopédie des films, 1940–1950. Pygmalion, 1986
- Oscherwitz, Dayna & Higgins, MaryEllen . The A to Z of French Cinema. Scarecrow Press, 2009.
- Rège, Philippe. Encyclopedia of French Film Directors, Volume 1. Scarecrow Press, 2009.
