= Arbus (surname) =

Arbus is a surname. Notable people with the surname include:

- André Arbus (1903–1969), French furniture designer, sculptor and architect
- Allan Arbus (1918–2013), US actor, husband of:
- Diane Arbus (née Nemerov, 1923–1971), US photographer
- Doon Arbus (b. 1945), journalist, daughter of Allan and Diane Arbus
- Amy Arbus (b. 1954), photojournalist, daughter of Allan and Diane Arbus
