= Rose (1936 film) =

1936 film

- Directed by: Raymond Rouleau
- Written by: Tania Balachova
- Produced by: Charles Fasquelle
- Starring: Jean Servais; Lisette Lanvin; Henri Guisol
- Cinematography: Nikolai Toporkoff
- Music by: Jean Wiener
- Production company: Francol Film
- Distributed by: Gaumont-Franco-Film-Aubert
- Release date: 21 February 1936
- Running time: 80 minutes
- Country: France
- Language: French

Rose is a 1936 French comedy film directed by Raymond Rouleau and starring Jean Servais, Lisette Lanvin and Henri Guisol. It was distributed by Gaumont.

== Synopsis ==
In Saint Tropez a young bus driver falls in love with a holidaymaker, although she is engaged to another man. Meanwhile, he faces competition from a new coach company.

== Cast ==
- Jean Servais as Jean Sergent
- Lisette Lanvin as Madeleine
- Henri Guisol as Antonin
- Sylvia Bataille as Lucienne
- Georges Jamin as Georges
- Tania Balachova
- Émile Genevois

== Bibliography ==
- Bessy, Maurice & Chirat, Raymond. Histoire du cinéma français: 1935-1939. Pygmalion, 1986.
- Crisp, Colin. Genre, Myth and Convention in the French Cinema, 1929-1939. Indiana University Press, 2002.
- Rège, Philippe. Encyclopedia of French Film Directors, Volume 1. Scarecrow Press, 2009.
