= Annie Toinon =

French actress

- Born: 17 August 1875; Marsielles, France
- Died: 28 February 1967 (aged 91); Lagny-sur-Marne, France
- Occupation: Actress
- Years active: 1932–1942 (film)

Annie Toinon (17 August 1875 – 28 February 1967) was a French stage and film actress. She often worked with the writer-director Marcel Pagnol.

== Selected filmography ==
- Fanny (1932)
- Rocambole (1932)
- Jofroi (1934)
- Angèle (1934)
- Merlusse (1935)
- The Gardens of Murcia (1936)
- L'Arlésienne (1942)

== Bibliography ==
- Crisp, Colin. French Cinema—A Critical Filmography: Volume 1, 1929-1939. Indiana University Press, 2015.
