= Jack Ledru =

French song and operetta composer (1922–2013)

Jack Ledru (1922 – March 2013) was a French song and operetta composer.

== Biography ==
Jack Ledru studied at the Conservatoire de Paris where he won a prize for piano. He began his artistic career by accompanying great singing stars: Georges Guétary, Lucienne Delyle, Suzy Delair, Charles Trenet.

He wrote instrumental and vocal parts and a ballet, le Baiser, created in Lille in 1967. He conducted the orchestras of radio, television and many theaters (Mogador, Chatelet Theatre in Paris and province).

He began writing operettas in 1954. For Roger Nicolas he composed Mon P'tit Pote which was played more than three years on a row. For the famous entertainer, he would write Bidule (1959) and A toi de jouer (1961). In 1962, he addressed the traditional operetta by offering Rudy Hirigoyen Farandole d’amour. But his two most successful hits were dedicated to the couple Marcel Merkès and Paulette Merval, Michael Strogoff (1964) and Vienne chante et danse (1967).

Most of his career continued essentially in the province: C'est pas l'Pérou (1976), Quadrille Viennois where he mingled tunes by Franz von Suppé and his own compositions, and La peur des coups after Courteline, played in Tours in 1977.

In collaboration with Guy Lafarge, he composed Le Petit Café (Mulhouse, 1980) and La Cagnotte (Lille, 1983), with Paul Bonneau, La Parisienne (Tours, 1982). Finally, he brought together the music of various composers for the operetta Paris Belle Époque.

== Main works ==
- 1954: Mon p'tit pote
- 1959: Bidule
- 1961: A toi de jouer
- 1962: Farandole d'Amour
- 1964: Michel Strogoff
- 1967: Vienne chante et danse
- 1975: La Baraka
- 1976: C'est pas l'Pérou
- 1977: Quadrille viennois
- 1977: La Peur des coups
- 1980: Le petit café
- 1982: La Parisienne
- 1983: La Cagnotte
- 1987: Paris Belle Époque

== Songs ==
Ledru's 1953 song "Téléphonez-moi chérie", co-composed with Rene Denoncin and Maria Veldi, was recorded by Tino Rossi and others. It was given an English lyric and title by William Engvick, and the English adaptation, "Kiss and Run", was recorded by Peggy King, Jeri Southern, Johnny Hartman, Shirley Horn, and others.
