= Lisette Lanvin =

French actress

- Born: Elisabeth Etiennette Marie Caremil; 3 September 1913; Grasse, Alpes-Maritimes, France
- Died: 27 July 2004 (aged 90); Suresnes, Hauts-de-Seine, France
- Occupation: Actress
- Years active: 1931–1949 (film)

Lisette Lanvin (1913–2004) was a French film actress.

== Selected filmography ==
- Student's Hotel (1932)
- My Priest Among the Rich (1932)
- Rouletabille the Aviator (1932)
- Youth (1933)
- One Night's Secret (1934)
- In the Land of the Sun (1934)
- Happy Arenas (1935)
- Nitchevo (1936)
- Jenny (1936)
- Rose (1936)
- The Kings of Sport (1937)
- The Club of Aristocrats (1937)
- A Woman of No Importance (1937)
- The Pearls of the Crown (1937)
- Orage (1938)

== Bibliography ==
- Goble, Alan. The Complete Index to Literary Sources in Film. Walter de Gruyter, 1999.
