= Three Sailors (1957 film) =

1957 films

- Directed by: Maurice de Canonge
- Written by: Henri Alibert (operetta); Marcel Rivet; Juliette Saint-Giniez; René Sarvil (operetta); Maurice de Canonge
- Produced by: Pierre Gérin; Ignace Morgenstern
- Starring: Marcel Merkès; Henri Génès; Jeannette Batti
- Cinematography: Marc Fossard
- Edited by: Victor Grizelin
- Music by: Philippe-Gérard
- Production companies: Les Productions Cinématographiques; Cocinex; Noël Films
- Distributed by: Cocinor
- Release date: 5 July 1957
- Running time: 95 minutes
- Country: France
- Language: French

Three Sailors (French: Trois de la marine) is a 1957 French comedy film directed by Maurice de Canonge and starring Marcel Merkès, Henri Génès and Jeannette Batti. The film was made at the Victorine Studios in Nice with sets designed by the art director Claude Bouxin. It was shot in Eastmancolor.

== Cast ==
- Marcel Merkès as Antonin Brémond
- Henri Génès as Honoré
- Jeannette Batti as Angèle
- Jean Carmet as Papillote
- Colette Deréal as Patricia
- Paulette Merval as Mireille
- Jean-Roger Caussimon as Éric Bergen
- Jean Murat as Le chef des services secrets
- Victoria Marino as Peppina
- René Sarvil as Arsène
- Les Ballets de Mary-Jo Weldon as Themselves
- Pierre Janin
- Philippe Janvier
- Josselin
- [onny Mary
- Milly Mathis

== See also ==
- Three Sailors (1934)

== Bibliography ==
- Goble, Alan. The Complete Index to Literary Sources in Film. Walter de Gruyter, 1999.
