= Jenny (1936 film) =

- Directed by: Marcel Carné
- Screenplay by: Jacques Prévert; Jacques Constant
- Story by: Pierre Rocher
- Produced by: Albert Pinkovitch
- Starring: Françoise Rosay; Albert Préjean; Lisette Lanvin
- Cinematography: Roger Hubert
- Edited by: Ernest Hajos
- Music by: Joseph Kosma
- Production company: Réalisation d'art cinématographique
- Distributed by: Réalisation d'art cinématographique
- Release date: 18 September 1936
- Running time: 105 minutes
- Country: France
- Language: French

Jenny is a 1936 French drama film, the first full-length feature by Marcel Carné and the first of his successful collaborations with the dialogue writer Jacques Prévert and the composer Joseph Kosma. The screenplay is based on the novel La Prison de Velours by Louis Ribaud (1934). The leading roles are taken by Françoise Rosay, Albert Préjean, Charles Vanel, and Lisette Lanvin. It tells the story of a middle-aged woman in Paris who with underworld support has built up a smart night club, but her life starts falling apart when the young gangster she maintains as her lover falls in love with her daughter. At times the film moves into the realm of poetic realism, where the cinematography, music and dialogue infuse the lives and surroundings of ordinary people with poetry.

== Plot ==
After years working in London, Jenny's daughter Danielle falls out with her boy friend and decides to go back to her mother in Paris. This throws Jenny into confusion, as she has to move out of her elegant house in an exclusive suburb and hastily rent a flat. The house, bought with money from the gangster Benoît who would like to be her lover, is called a night club but is really somewhere for well-off men to meet prostitutes. The last thing Jenny wants is for her daughter to find out about the sordid club or about the young lover she maintains, a gangster called Lucien. Danielle soon becomes puzzled about phone calls and visitors, which lead her to think that the business which keeps her mother out all night may not be wholly legitimate.

One evening she turns up at the club alone and from behind a curtain sees enough to understand how her mother makes a living. While hiding she is molested by an over-eager customer, from whom she is rescued by a young man who rushes her outside. This is Lucien, and the two are at once struck with each other. While he admits freely that he is a criminal, neither mentions their link to Jenny. Leaving her mother, Danielle goes to live with Lucien and the two plan to move to London. Lucien then tells Jenny honestly that he is leaving her, which leaves the coast clear for Benoît, whose gangsters beat up Lucien. Jenny visits him in hospital, and has to hide quickly when Danielle comes in. Having lost daughter and lover, Jenny walks home reflecting on life's ups and downs.

== Cast ==
- Françoise Rosay as Jenny Gauthier, night club owner
- Albert Préjean as Lucien Dancret, her young lover
- Lisette Lanvin as Danielle Bricart, her daughter
- Charles Vanel as Benoît, gangster
- Roland Toutain as Xavier, friend of Lucien
- Sylvia Bataille as Florence, singer at the night club
- Jean-Louis Barrault as Le Dromadaire, gangster
- Robert Le Vigan as L'Albinos, customer at the night club
- Margo Lion as Madame Vrack, manager of the night club
- Joseph Kosma as harmonium player

== About the film ==
The film's sets were designed by the art director Jean d'Eaubonne.

== Bibliography ==
- Andrews, Dudley. Mists of Regret: Culture and Sensibility in Classic French Film. Princeton University Press, 1995.
