= The Time of the Cherries =

1938 film

- Directed by: Jean-Paul Le Chanois
- Written by: Jean-Paul Le Chanois; Pierre Unik
- Starring: Gaston Modot; Svetlana Pitoëff; Fabien Loris
- Cinematography: Jean Bourgoin; Alain Douarinou
- Edited by: Laura Sejourné
- Music by: Joseph Kosma
- Production company: Les Films Populaires
- Release date: 26 January 1938
- Running time: 81 minutes
- Country: France
- Language: French

The Time of the Cherries (French: Le temps des cerises) is a 1938 French drama film directed by Jean-Paul Le Chanois and starring Gaston Modot, Svetlana Pitoëff and Fabien Loris. It takes its title from the song of the same name. The film's sets were designed by the art director Georges Wakhévitch.

== Partial cast ==
- Gaston Modot as Gaston Ravaux
- Svetlana Pitoëff as Gilberte
- Fabien Loris as Pierrot
- Jandeline as La paysanne
- François Viguier as Le paysan
- Georges Spanelly as Le directeur
- Jean Dasté as Le fils du directeur
- Jacques B. Brunius as Le petit-fils du directeur
- Camille Corney as Le décorateur
- André Delferrière
- Claire Gérard as La dame maniérée
- Gabrielle Fontan as Antoinette

== Bibliography ==
- Andrews, Dudley. Mists of Regret: Culture and Sensibility in Classic French Film. Princeton University Press, 1995.
