= Notre-Dame de la Mouise =

- Dutch: Notre Dame van de sloppen
- Directed by: Robert Péguy
- Written by: René Delacroix; Grégoire Leclos
- Based on: Le Christ dans la banlieue by Pierre Lhande
- Produced by: Joseph A. de Sève
- Starring: Édouard Delmont; François Rozet; Georges Rollin
- Cinematography: Fédote Bourgasoff
- Edited by: Jacques Desagneaux
- Music by: Henri Poussigue
- Production companies: Fiat Film; France Film; Gofilex
- Distributed by: D.U.C. France Film
- Release date: March 29, 1941
- Running time: 90 minutes
- Countries: Netherlands; France
- Language: French

Notre-Dame de la Mouise (French: [nɔtʁ dam də la mwiz]; Dutch: Notre Dame van de sloppen) is a 1941 Dutch-French film directed by Robert Péguy.

== Cast ==
- Édouard Delmont ... Le père Didier (as Delmont)
- François Rozet ... L'abbé
- Georges Rollin ... Bibi
- René Sarvil ... Julot (as Sarvil)
- Champi ... Nénesse
- Rivers Cadet ... Monsieur Eugène
- Rolla Norman
- Henri de Livry (as De Livry)
- René Alié
- René Lefevre-Bel
- François Rodon ... Gosse de Pou
- Félix Claude
- Odette Joyeux ... La môme
- Odette Barencey ... Zéphyrine (as Odette Barancey)
- Solange Varennes ... La Sauterelle
