= Annie du Far-West =

Annie du Far-West is a French operetta, adapted from Annie Get Your Gun by André Mouëzy-Éon and Albert Willemetz. It debuted at the Théâtre du Châtelet in Paris on 19 February 1950. It starred Marcel Merkès and Lily Fayol and has been described as "a production that featured live elephants and that transformed Tamiris's Native American choreography into an African-American boogie-woogie". It ran successfully for over a year. It was produced at the Volksoper in Vienna from 27 February 1957.
