= The Secret of Master Cornille =

- Short story by Alphonse Daudet
- Country: France
- Genre(s): Historical short story

Publication
- Published in: Letters from My Windmill

"The Secret Of Master Cornille" is a short story written by Alphonse Daudet and included in the collection Letters from My Windmill.

== Plot ==
Master Cornille's mill is the last one left in the region since a steam-powered flour mill was installed nearby. Although no one gives him any more wheat to grind he continues to make his family and the villagers believe that it is still in operation. He runs his mill empty, until the day his secret is discovered. He is disconsolate and believes himself dishonored. By empathy, the villagers decide to bring wheat to the mill. Master Cornille has tears of joy; thereafter people across the region continue to regularly supply him with bags of grain... but eventually when Master Cornille dies, the last of the windmills fades away with him for ever.

== Interpretation ==
The author invites us to reflect upon the moral challenges faced by people attached to their traditions in a constantly modernising and industrialised world. It reminds us of the importance of finding a balance between being open to material advantages offered by technology, all the while heeding the spiritual side of our roots and traditional ways of life.

== Adaptation ==
It is one of three stories from Letters from My Windmill that Marcel Pagnol adapted into the 1954 film Letters from My Windmill.
