= Jean Bourgoin =

French cinematographer (1913–1991)

- Born: 4 March 1913; Paris, France
- Died: 3 September 1991 (aged 78); Paris, France
- Occupation: Cinematographer
- Years active: 1935–1972 (film)

Jean Bourgoin (4 March 1913 – 3 September 1991) was a French cinematographer. He won the Academy Award for Best Cinematography for the 1962 war film The Longest Day.

== Selected filmography ==
- The Time of the Cherries (1938)
- La Marseillaise (1938)
- Cristobal's Gold (1940)
- The Man Who Sold His Soul (1943)
- It Happened at the Inn (1943)
- Box of Dreams (1945)
- Dawn Devils (1946)
- Christine Gets Married (1946)
- Sybille's Night (1947)
- Mystery Trip (1947)
- Colomba (1948)
- Branquignol (1949)
- The Voice of Dreams (1949)
- Justice Is Done (1950)
- The Real Culprit (1951)
- Shadow and Light (1951)
- Rue des Saussaies (1951)
- It Happened in Paris (1952)
- We Are All Murderers (1952)
- The House on the Dune (1952)
- Follow That Man (1953)
- Open Letter (1953)
- Before the Deluge (1954)
- Black Dossier (1955)
- The River of Three Junks (1957)
- Goha (1958)
- Mon Oncle (1958)
- Black Orpheus (1959)
- A Mistress for the Summer (1960)
- The Counterfeit Traitor (1962)
- Gigot (1962)
- The Longest Day (1962)
- Germinal (1963)
- Impossible on Saturday (1965)

== Bibliography ==
- Langman, Larry. Destination Hollywood: The Influence of Europeans on American Filmmaking. McFarland, 2000.
