= One Night's Secret =

1934 film

- Directed by: Félix Gandéra
- Written by: Félix Gandéra
- Produced by: Félix Gandéra
- Starring: Armand Bernard; Albert Préjean; Lisette Lanvin
- Cinematography: Jean Isnard; Jacques Montéran
- Music by: Raoul Moretti
- Production company: Productions Félix Gandéra
- Release date: 5 October 1934
- Running time: 93 minutes
- Country: France
- Language: French

One Night's Secret (French: Le secret d'une nuit) is a 1934 French comedy film directed by Félix Gandéra and starring Armand Bernard, Albert Préjean and Lisette Lanvin. The film's sets were designed by the art director Robert Gys.

== Synopsis ==
The naïve Sylvain arrives in Marseille to be tricked by two men he encounters in a bar, who want to use him as an accomplice in a criminal scheme.

== Cast ==
- Armand Bernard as Coco
- Albert Préjean as Sylvain Renaud
- Lisette Lanvin as Claudie
- Janine Merrey as Zizine
- Germaine Rouer as Madame Hoppguer
- André Siméon as Le Petit Frisé
- Fernand Fabre as Raymond
- Jean Aymé as Le metteur en scène
- Paul Clerget as Monsieur Hoppguer
- Andrée Guize as La secrétaire
- Marcel Maupi as Le grand salé
- Eugène Stuber as Le patron du bistrot
- Henri Trévoux as L'assistant
- Christiane Dor as Minor Role
- Danielle Darrieux as Minor Role

== Bibliography ==
- Bessy, Maurice & Chirat, Raymond. Histoire du cinéma français: 1929-1934. Pygmalion, 1988.
- Crisp, Colin. Genre, Myth and Convention in the French Cinema, 1929-1939. Indiana University Press, 2002.
- Oscherwitz, Dayna & Higgins, MaryEllen . The A to Z of French Cinema. Scarecrow Press, 2009.
- Rège, Philippe. Encyclopedia of French Film Directors, Volume 1. Scarecrow Press, 2009.
