= Happy Arenas (1958 film) =

1958 film

- Directed by: Maurice de Canonge
- Written by: Juliette Saint-Giniez
- Based on: Happy Arenas by Henri Allibert and René Sarvil
- Produced by: René Allamelle; Jean Martinetti
- Starring: Fernand Raynaud; Danielle Godet; Colette Ripert
- Cinematography: Willy Faktorovitch
- Edited by: Victor Grizelin
- Music by: Vincent Scotto
- Production companies: Compagnie Méditerranéenne de Films; Athos Films; Eminente Films
- Distributed by: Les Films Fernand Rivers
- Release date: 13 August 1958
- Running time: 107 minutes
- Country: France
- Language: French

Happy Arenas (French: Arènes joyeuses) is a 1958 French musical comedy film directed by Maurice de Canonge and starring Fernand Raynaud, Danielle Godet and Colette Ripert. It is an operetta film, based on the 1934 operetta of the same title by Henri Allibert, René Sarvil and Vincent Scotto. Location shooting took place around Martigues and the Camargue. The film's sets were designed by the art director Robert Giordani. The operetta had previously been made into the 1935 film Happy Arenas directed by Karl Anton.

== Cast ==
- Fernand Raynaud as Fernand Cyprien, de Chalamond
- Danielle Godet as Marina
- Colette Ripert as Marguerite
- René Sarvil as Maître Arno
- Jean Vinci as Rémy
- Rellys as Hernandez
- Antoine Balpêtré as Le clochard
- Victoria Marino as Thérèsa
- Milly Mathis as Mme. Arno
- Luis Montez as Pablo
- Marie-José Nat as Violette
- André Vylar as Pepito

== Bibliography ==
- Powrie, Phil & Cadalanu, Marie . The French Film Musical. Bloomsbury Publishing, 2020.
- Rège, Philippe. Encyclopedia of French Film Directors, Volume 1. Scarecrow Press, 2009.
