= Isaac Moillon =

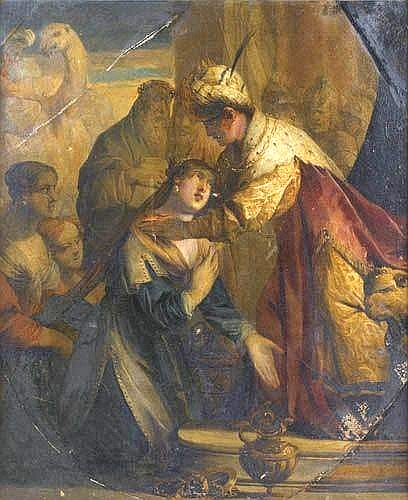
Solomon and the Queen of Sheba

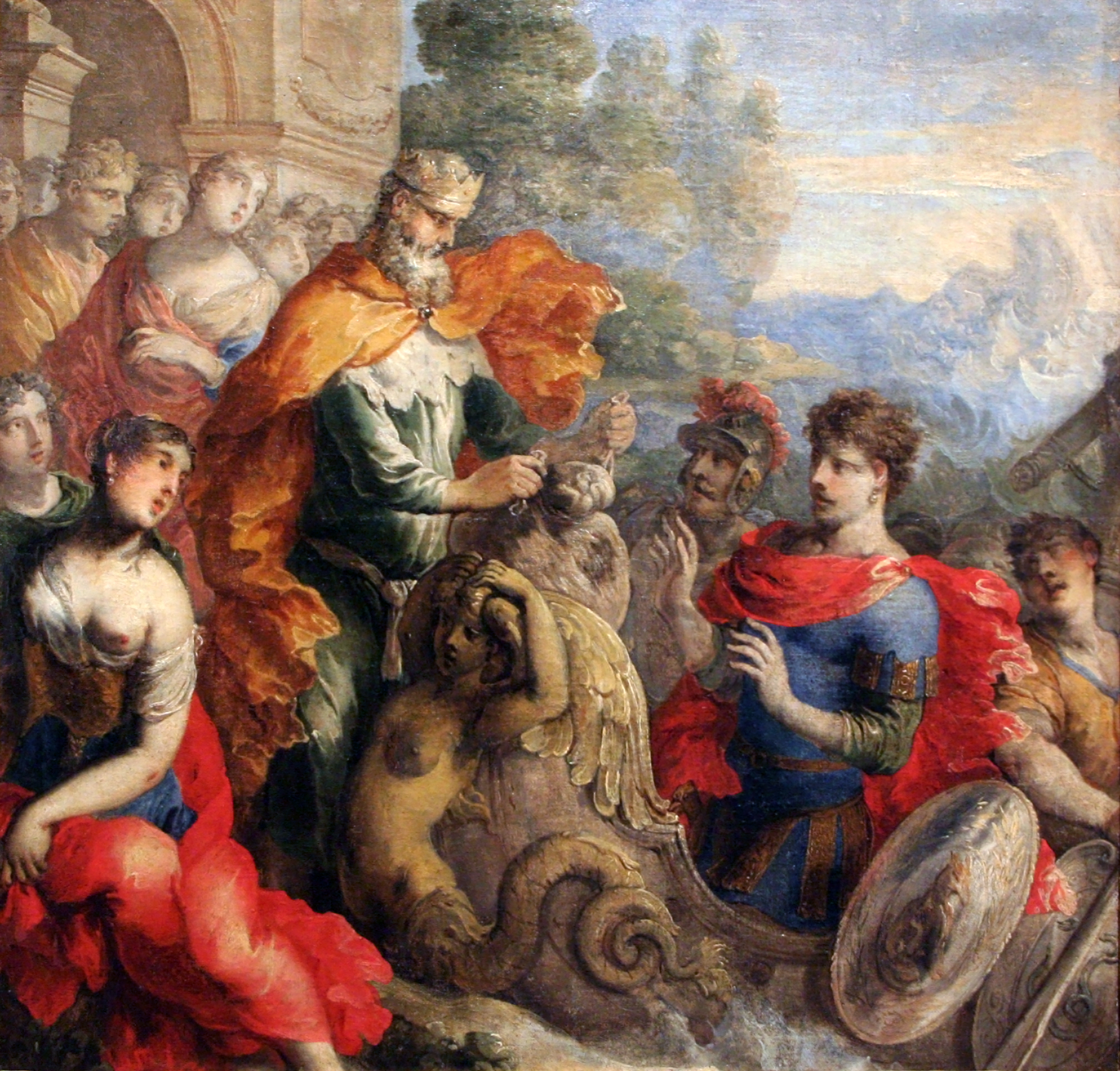
Aeolus Giving the Winds to Odysseus

Isaac Moillon (8 July 1614, Paris - 26 May 1673, Paris) was a French Baroque painter of scenes from mythology and the Bible. He also designed tapestries. His work was forgotten after his death, until interest was revived in the 1980s.

== Biography ==
His father, the painter Nicolas Moillon (1555-1619), died when he was only five years old. Shortly after, his mother married another painter, François Garnier, who specialized in still-lifes. His sister, Louise Moillon, would become one of the best known still-life painters of that period. Despite the intense religious situation at that time, both he and his sister remained Protestants.

His first works date from 1634 to 1637. Between 1638 and 1640, he created decorations, mostly of a military nature, in the Hôtel Bautru, an hôtel particulier, under the direction of its architect, Louis Le Vau and the Master Builder Michel Villedo, in the Rue Croix-des-Petits-Champs. It was demolished in 1823 to make way for the new Galerie Vivienne. His fame at the time rested largely on murals depicting Christ as a healer, made at the Hôtel-Dieu de Beaune (now the Hospices de Beaune) in 1646. He was named a member of the Académie royale de peinture et de sculpture in 1655.

As a painter to the King, he created several designs for tapestries, including a few on the history of Achilles, that were woven at the Aubusson manufactory. Some are kept at the Hospices de Beaune, along with miniatures depicting scenes from the life of Christ. A series on Ulysses may be seen at the Château de Villemonteix. The Cité internationale de la tapisserie in Aubusson has nine pieces on Dido and Aeneas. Seven on the "Illustrious Women of Antiquity" are at the Château d'Ansouis in Vaucluse.
