= Colomba (1948 film) =

1948 film

- Directed by: Émile Couzinet
- Written by: Emile Couzinet
- Based on: Colomba by Prosper Mérimée
- Produced by: Emile Couzinet
- Starring: José Luccioni; Édouard Delmont; Pierre Magnier
- Cinematography: Jean Bourgoin
- Music by: Vincent Scotto; Henri Tomasi
- Production company: Burgus Films
- Distributed by: Burgus Films
- Release date: 14 June 1948
- Running time: 94 minutes
- Country: France
- Language: French

Colomba is a 1948 French historical drama film directed by Émile Couzinet and starring José Luccioni, Édouard Delmont and Pierre Magnier. The film's sets were designed by the art director René Renneteau. Location shooting took place around Corsica. It is an adaptation of the 1840 novella of the same name by Prosper Mérimée. A Hollywood version of the story Vendetta was released two years later.

== Synopsis ==
In Corsica in the 1860s, a young man returns to the island at the behest of his sister Colomba who wants him to pursue the traditional vendetta against those who have killed his father. Yet he meets a young Englishwoman who he is attracted to and tries to dissuade him from shedding blood.

== Cast ==
- José Luccioni as Orso
- Catherine Damet as Colomba
- Édouard Delmont as Bariccini
- Pierre Magnier as Le préfet
- Raphaël Patorni as Brandolaccio
- Jacques Louvigny
- W. Edward Stirling
- Jacques Henley
- Frédérique Nadar
- Charles Blavette
- Marcel Maupi
- Jean Gosselin
- Georges Patrix
- Angelo Lupi
- Annie Luccioni
- Jackie Luccioni
- Jean-Claude Cavailles

== Bibliography ==
- Goble, Alan. The Complete Index to Literary Sources in Film. Walter de Gruyter, 1999.
- Rège, Philippe. Encyclopedia of French Film Directors, Volume 1. Scarecrow Press, 2009.
