= Letters from My Windmill =

1869 collection of short stories by Alphonse Daudet

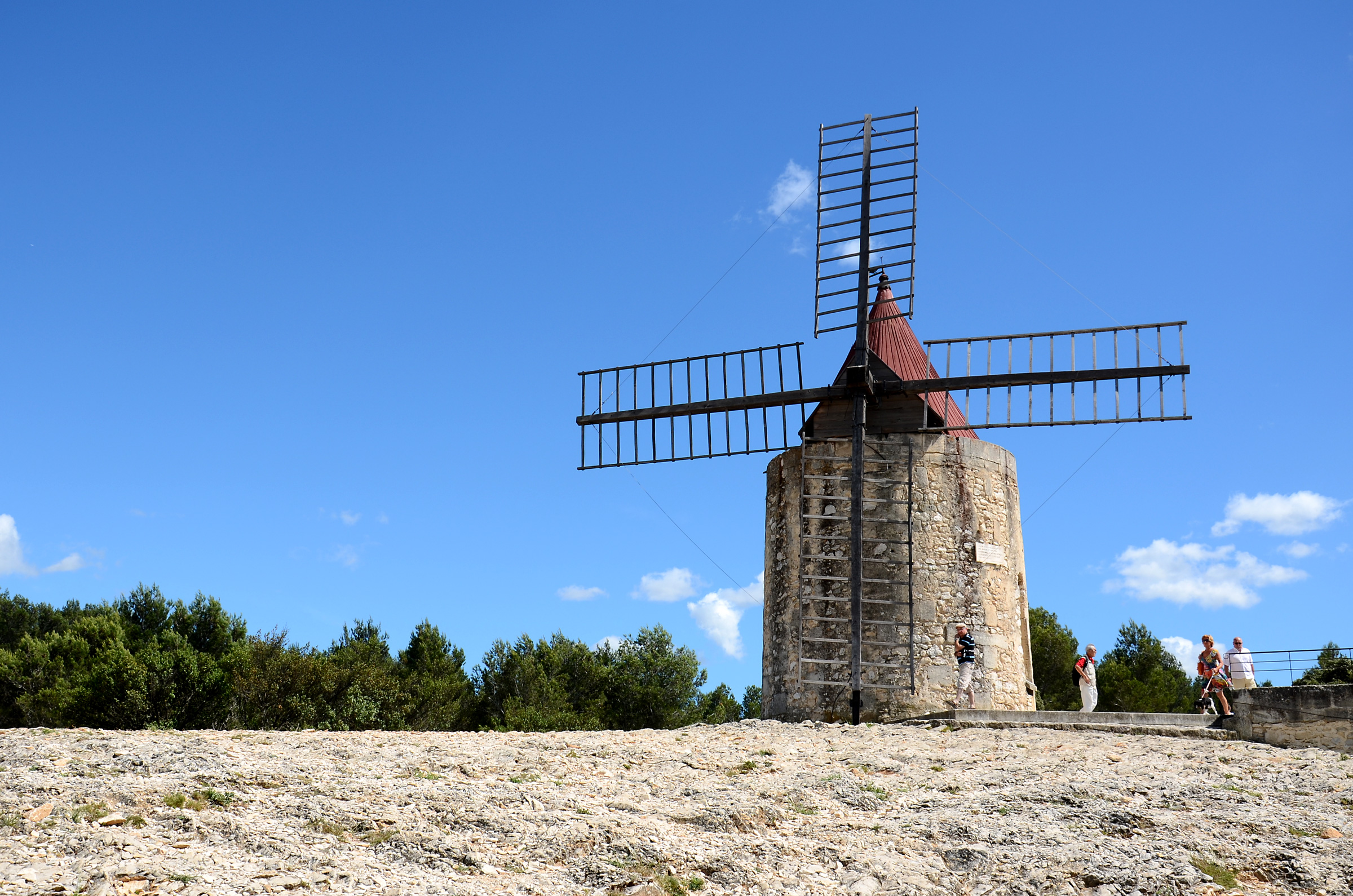
- Mill of Alphonse Daudet at Fontvieille.
- Author: Alphonse Daudet
- Original title: Lettres de mon moulin
- Language: French
- Publication date: 1869
- Publication place: France
- ISBN: 9782266156288

Letters from My Windmill (French: Lettres de mon moulin) is a collection of short stories by Alphonse Daudet first published in its entirety in 1869. Some of the stories had been published earlier in newspapers or journals such as Le Figaro and L'Evénement as early as 1865. Some of the stories were written in collaboration with Paul Arène, but the extent of his output is quite impossible to determine.

The stories are all told by the author in the first person, typically addressing a Parisian reader. The author, having moved from his home in Paris, recounts short bucolic tales about his new life in Provence as well as his trips to Corsica and French Algeria. The stories vary from day-to-day events in southern France to Provençal folktales, and often feature professions and faunal references characteristic of Provence. The tales are characterised by pity, tenderness and sadness, alongside gaiety and mockery.

Letters From My Windmill is sometimes considered to be Daudet's most important work. It is cherished by many French, particularly in the South, for the picture it paints of the local culture.

== Adaptations ==
A French-language film with the same title was made in 1954 by Marcel Pagnol composed of four stories: "The Three Low Masses", "The Elixir of Father Gaucher", "The Priest of Cucugnan" and "The Secret Of Master Cornille".

The Belgian comic author Mitteï made a comic adaptation of the book in three volumes between 1979 and 1985, which were released in Dutch, French and the French dialect of Liège.
