= Prelude to Madness =

1948 Italian drama film

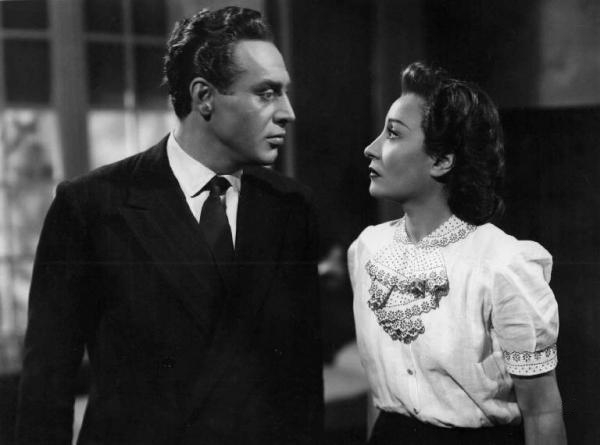
- Directed by: Gianni Franciolini
- Written by: Gianni Franciolini; Gianna Manzini; Vittorio Nino Novarese; Ivo Perilli; Antonio Pietrangeli; Guido Piovene
- Based on: The Kreutzer Sonata by Leo Tolstoy
- Produced by: Carlo Ponti
- Starring: Clara Calamai; Roldano Lupi; Jean Servais
- Cinematography: Carlo Montuori
- Edited by: Mario Serandrei
- Music by: Nino Rota
- Production company: Lux Film
- Distributed by: Lux Film
- Release date: 10 January 1948
- Running time: 73 minutes
- Country: Italy
- Language: Italian

Prelude to Madness or Loveless Lovers (Italian: Amanti senza amore) is a 1948 Italian drama film directed by Gianni Franciolini and starring Clara Calamai, Roldano Lupi and Jean Servais. It is inspired by the 1889 novella The Kreutzer Sonata by Leo Tolstoy.

The film's sets were designed by the art director Piero Gherardi. Location shooting took place in Orvieto and San Remo. It earned around 55 million lira at the box office.

== Cast ==
- Clara Calamai as Elena Leonardi
- Roldano Lupi as Piero Leonardi
- Jean Servais as Enrico Miller – il violinista
- Maria Melvin as Madre di Elena
- Lucio Marsaglia as Direttore del Casinò
- Ivo Sogliano as Segretario di Miller

== Bibliography ==
- Chiti, Roberto & Poppi, Roberto. Dizionario del cinema italiano: Dal 1945 al 1959. Gremese Editore, 1991.
- Gundle, Stephen. Fame Amid the Ruins: Italian Film Stardom in the Age of Neorealism. Berghahn Books, 2019.
