= Jean Servais =

Belgian actor (1910–1976)

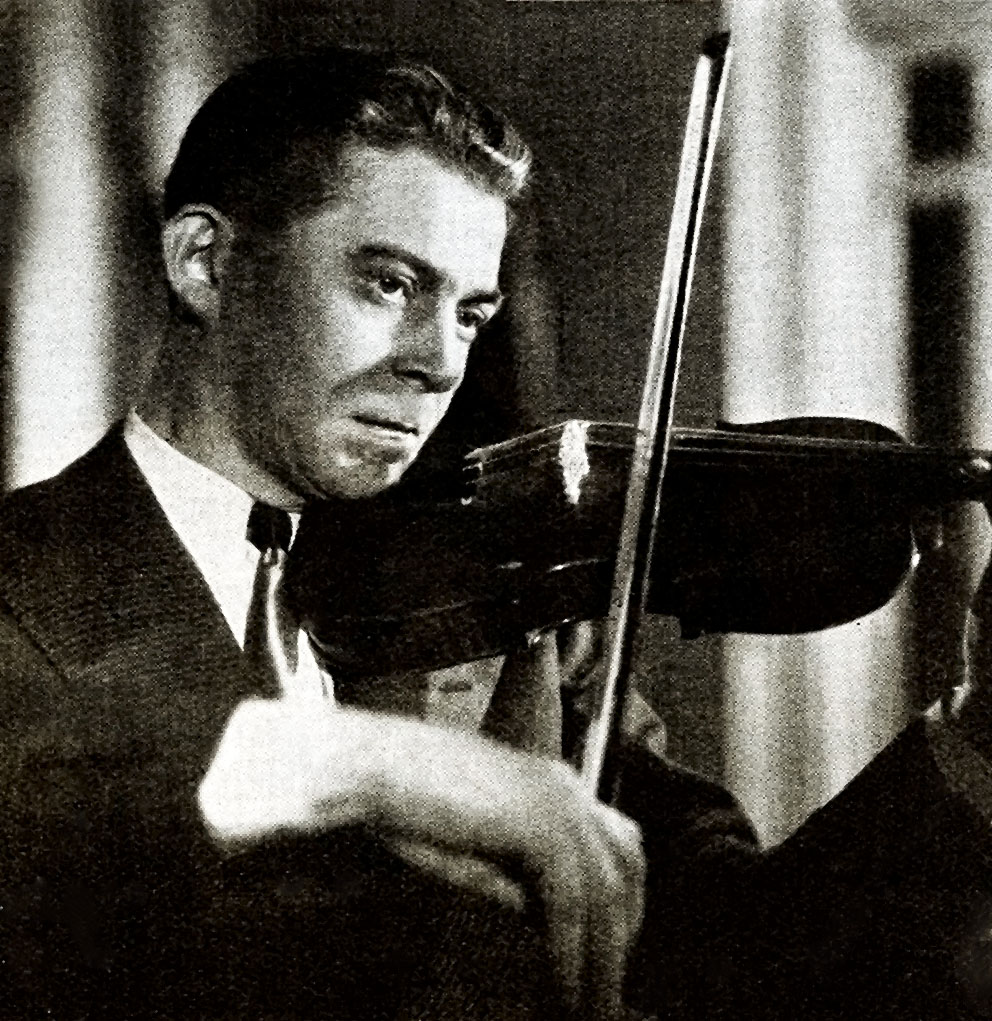
- Servais in Prelude to Madness (1948).
- Born: 24 September 1910; Antwerp, Belgium
- Died: 17 February 1976 (aged 65); Paris, France
- Occupation: Actor
- Years active: 1932–1939, 1948–1973
- Spouse(s): Dominique Blanchar; Gilberte Graillot

Jean Servais (French: [ʒɑ̃ sɛʁvɛ]; 24 September 1910 – 17 February 1976) was a Belgian film and stage actor. He acted in many 20th century French cinema productions, from the 1930s through the early 1970s.

He was married to actress Dominique Blanchar (1952–1953) and later to Gilberte Graillot.

== Career ==
Servais trained at the Brussels Conservatory of Dramatic Arts, where he won the Second Prize. His acting skills came to the attention of Raymond Rouleau, and he was hired at the Théâtre du Marais, where he acted in Le mal de jeunesse, which was successful in Brussels and in Paris. He was also a member of Jean-Louis Barrault's theatre company.

His first film role was as the simple country dweller who was the victim of an error by the justice system in the film Criminel (1932), directed by Jack Forrester. Servais's film career continued in the 1930s with roles in films such as La Chanson De L'Adieu (1934) and La Vie Est Magnifique (1938). After a break in acting during World War II, he returned to the screen with roles in films such as La Danse De Mort (1948).

In the 1950s, he appeared in the crime drama Rififi (1955), which François Truffaut ranked as the best film noir, directed by American Jules Dassin, in which he played a leader of a gang of jewel thieves.

He appeared in another film directed by Jules Dassin in 1957, He Who Must Die (Celui qui doit mourir). He also appeared in a film written and directed by Luis Buñuel, La fièvre monte à El Pao (1959).

In the 1950s and 1960s, Servais rejoined the Renaud-Barrault theatre troupe for several plays, including La Répétition ou l'Amour puni (1950), Volpone (1955), and Marat/Sade (1966).

In the 1960s, Servais took small character roles in popular international fare such as The Longest Day (1962), an epic recreation of the Allied invasion of Normandy, and That Man from Rio (1964). Other films in which he acted include Le Sahara brûle (1961), Un Soir Par Hasard (1964), and Avec la peau des autres (1966).

He had roles in several films in the early 1970s, such as The Devil's Nightmare (1971), an Italian horror series, and Le Protecteur (1974), about a recently released prisoner who tries to find his daughter who has fallen into the underworld of prostitution.

== Selected filmography ==
Films with roles played by Jean Servais include:

- Mater dolorosa (1932)
- Criminal (1933) – Bob Graham
- Youth (1933) – Pierre
- The Faceless Voice (1933) – Gérard
- Les Misérables (1934) – Marius Pontmercy
- Angèle (1934) – Albin
- Amok (1934) – Jan
- Song of Farewell (1934) – Frédéric Chopin
- Last Hour (1934) – Jean Benoit
- Bourrasque (1935) – Marcel Bardet
- Rose (1936) – Jean Sergent
- Valse éternelle (1936) – Pierre Kramer
- Une fille à papa (1936) – Henri Guiraud
- The Forsaken (1937) – Prieur
- Gigolette (1937) – Docteur Jacques Bernais
- Police mondaine (1937) – l'ingénieur Philippe Dancourt
- Terra di fuoco (1939) – Maxime / Massimo
- L'Étrange Nuit de Noël (1939) – Le docteur Maire
- Quartier sans soleil (1939) – Jo
- La vie est magnifique (1940) – Paul
- Those of the Sky (1941) – Monval
- Fromont jeune et Risler aîné (1941) – Fromont jeune
- Patricia (1942) – Fabien
- Tornavara (1943) – Anders
- Finance noire (1943) – François Carré
- Mahlia the Mestiza (1943) – Henri de Roussière -le fils des parents adoptifs de Mahlia
- La vie de plaisir (1944) – Le vicomte Roland de la Chaume – un oisif
- The Seventh Door (1947) – Le chauffeur du car
- Prelude to Madness (1948) – Enrico Miller – il violinista
- The Dance of Death (1948) – Kurt
- Une si jolie petite plage (1949) – Fred
- Mademoiselle de La Ferté (1949) – Lord Osborne
- Le furet (1950) – Stadler
- The Glass Castle (1950)
- Une si jolie petite plage (1950) – Laurent Bertal (French version)
- Le Plaisir (1952) – L'ami de Jean / La voix de Maupassant (segment "Le Modèle")
- Mina de Vanghel (1953) – Ruppert
- Rue de l'Estrapade (1953) – Jacques Christian
- Tourbillon (1953) – Fred Maurin
- Le Chevalier de la nuit (1953) – Le châtelain
- Les crimes de l'amour (1953) – Ruppert (segment 1 : 'Mina de Vanghel')
- Rififi (1955) – Tony le Stéphanois
- The Heroes Are Tired (1955) – François Séverin
- Le couteau sous la gorge (1955) – Marc Hourtin
- The Lebanese Mission (1956) – Maj. Charles Hobson
- He Who Must Die (1957) – Priest Fotis
- The Wheel (1957) – Pierre Pelletier
- Send a Woman When the Devil Fails (1957) – Henri Godot
- Tamango (1958) – Doctor Corot
- That Night (1958) – André Reverdy
- Les Jeux dangereux (1958) – Fournier, le détective privé
- La Fièvre Monte à El Pao (1959) – Alejandro Gual
- Murder at 45 R.P.M. (1960) – Maurice Faugères
- The Sahara Is Burning (1961) – Wagner
- World in My Pocket (1961) – Gypo
- Les Menteurs (1961) – Paul Dutraz
- Le jeu de la vérité (1961) – Jean-François Vérate
- The Corsican Brothers (1961) – Gerolamo Sagona
- Le Crime ne paie pas (1962) – Ernest Vaughan (segment "L'affaire Hugues")
- The Longest Day (1962) – Rear Admiral Robert Jaujard
- The Cage (1963) – Rispal
- La soupe aux poulets (1963) – Commissaire Beronnet
- Un soir... par hasard (1963) – Piort
- Rififi in the City (1964) – Maurice Leprince
- That Man from Rio (1964) – Prof. Norbert Catalan
- Sursis pour un espion (1965) – Dr. Roussel
- Thomas the Impostor (1965) – Pasquel-Duport
- Lost Command (1966) – General Melies
- Avec la peau des autres (1966) – Wegelt
- Qualcuno ha tradito (1967) – Jean
- Coplan Saves His Skin (1968) – Saroghu
- Black Jesus (1968) – Commander
- Better a Widow (1968) – Baron Misceni
- They Came to Rob Las Vegas (1968) – Gino
- Peau d'âne (1970) – La voix de (voice)
- The Devil's Nightmare (1971) – Baron von Rhoneberg
- Le Seuil du vide (1972) – De Gournais, le directeur de la galerie
- L'Affaire Crazy Capo (1973) – Joseph Marchesi, dit Crazy Capo
- Le Protecteur (1974) – Ancelin
- Un tueur, un flic, ainsi soit-il... (1977) – Forzi (final film role)
