= Marcel Merkès =

French opera singer

Marcel Merkès (7 July 1920 – 30 March 2007) was a French tenor operetta singer.

Merkès was born in Bordeaux. After receiving several prizes in singing at the Conservatoire de Bordeaux, he started at the age of 22 years at the Grand Théâtre de Bordeaux in the role of Des Grieux in Manon, an opera by Jules Massenet. He often performed an operetta duo with his wife Paulette Merval, a singer and violinist, who he had met at the Conservatoire de Bordeaux. They totaled more than 10,500 performances and recorded many records in their careers. He was a prolific performer at the Théâtre Mogador in Paris.

Merkès was married to violinist and singer Paulette Merval. Their son, Alain Merkès, also pursued a career as singer under the name Alain Valmer. Marcel died in Pessac.

== Notable performances ==
Notable performances, debut of performance is given:

- Rêve de Valse by Oscar Straus – Théâtre Mogador, Paris, 22 March 1947
- Imperial Violets by Vincent Scotto – Théâtre Mogador, Paris, 31 January 1948
- Annie du Far-West by Irving Berlin – Théâtre du Châtelet, Paris, 19 February 1950
- Rose-Marie by Rudolf Friml – Théâtre de l'Empire, 12 May 1950
- La Veuve joyeuse by Franz Lehár – Théâtre Mogador, Paris, 17 November 1951
- Les Amants de Venise by Vincent Scotto – Théâtre Mogador, Paris, 5 December 1953
- Les amours de Don Juan by Juan Morata – Théâtre Mogador, Paris, 23 December 1955
- Michel Strogoff by Jack Ledru – Théâtre Mogador, Paris, 5 December 1964
- Vienne chante et Danse by Johann Strauss II and Jack Ledru – Théâtre Mogador, Paris, 25 November 1967
- Douchka by Georges Garvarentz and Charles Aznavour – Théâtre Mogador, Paris, 4 October 1973
- Princesse Czardas by Emmerich Kálmán, Avignon 1979–1982

== Filmography ==
- Trois de la Canebière by Maurice de Canonge (1956)
- Three Sailors by Maurice de Canonge (1957)
