= In the Land of the Sun (1952 film) =

1952 film

- Directed by: Maurice de Canonge
- Written by: Maurice de Canonge; André Tabet
- Based on: In the Land of the Sun by Henri Alibert and René Sarvil
- Produced by: Fritz Bukofzer
- Starring: Tino Rossi; Véra Norman; Antonin Berval
- Cinematography: André Germain
- Edited by: Isabelle Elman
- Music by: Vincent Scotto
- Production company: Les Films Tellus
- Distributed by: DisCina
- Release date: 21 March 1952
- Running time: 96 minutes
- Country: France
- Language: French

In the Land of the Sun (French: Au pays du soleil) is a 1952 French musical comedy film directed by Maurice de Canonge and starring Tino Rossi, Véra Norman and Antonin Berval. It is based on the operetta of the same title by Henri Alibert and René Sarvil which had previously been adapted into a 1934 film In the Land of the Sun starring Ailbert. The film's sets were designed by the art director Paul Laurenti.

== Cast ==
- Tino Rossi as Titin Olivieri
- Véra Norman as Miette Rizoul
- Antonin Berval as L'inquiet
- Édouard Delmont as Rizoul
- Milly Mathis as Mme Fougasse
- Frédéric Duvallès as M. Bouffetranche
- René Sarvil as Chichois
- Charles Lemontier as Le juge d'instruction
- Jacqueline Pierreux as Mado
- Georges Tabet as Francis

== Bibliography ==
- Goble, Alan. The Complete Index to Literary Sources in Film. Walter de Gruyter, 1999.
- Rège, Philippe. Encyclopedia of French Film Directors, Volume 1. Scarecrow Press, 2009.
