= Happy Arenas (1935 film) =

1935 film directed by Karl Anton

- Directed by: Karl Anton
- Written by: Max Kolpé; Yves Mirande; René Pujol
- Based on: Happy Arenas by Henri Allibert
- Produced by: André E. Algazy
- Starring: Lucien Baroux; Betty Stockfeld; André Alerme
- Cinematography: Harry Stradling Sr.
- Edited by: Jacques Brillouin; Jean Oser
- Music by: Vincent Scotto
- Production company: Metropa Films
- Distributed by: Francinex
- Release date: 20 December 1935
- Running time: 108 minutes
- Country: France
- Language: French

Happy Arenas (French: Arènes joyeuses) is a 1935 French musical comedy film directed by Karl Anton and starring Lucien Baroux, Betty Stockfeld and André Alerme. It is an operetta film, based on the 1934 operetta of the same title by Henri Allibert and Vincent Scotto. Location shooting took place around Martigues on the French Riviera. The film's sets were designed by the art director Jean Lafitte. It was remade as a 1958 film of the same name directed by Maurice de Canonge.

Notable as one of the European films photographed by American cinematographer Harry Stradling and the last appearance by the French celebrity Polaire.

== Cast ==
- Lucien Baroux as Escopette
- Betty Stockfeld as Betty
- André Alerme as M. Gardy
- Lisette Lanvin as Marguerite Cabissol
- Henri Alibert as Rémy de Martigues
- Rellys as Ficelle
- Rafael Medina as Le torero Chico de Granada
- Marthe Mussine as La bonne
- Lucien Callamand as Fadoli
- Jean Sinoël as Le garçon d'hôtel
- Cécile Lemaire as Violette Cabissol
- Fernand Charpin as Cabissol
- Félix Oudart as Calixte
- Polaire as La bohémienne

== Bibliography ==
- Bessy, Maurice & Chirat, Raymond. Histoire du cinéma français: 1935-1939. Pygmalion, 1986.
- Crisp, Colin. Genre, Myth and Convention in the French Cinema, 1929-1939. Indiana University Press, 2002.
- Powrie, Phil & Cadalanu, Marie . The French Film Musical. Bloomsbury Publishing, 2020.
- Rège, Philippe. Encyclopedia of French Film Directors, Volume 1. Scarecrow Press, 2009.
