= Merlusse =

1935 film

- Directed by: Marcel Pagnol
- Written by: Marcel Pagnol
- Produced by: Marcel Pagnol
- Starring: Henri Poupon; André Pollack; Annie Toinon
- Cinematography: Albert Assouad
- Edited by: Suzanne de Troeye
- Music by: Vincent Scotto
- Production company: Films Marcel Pagnol
- Distributed by: Films Marcel Pagnol
- Release date: 6 December 1935
- Running time: 72 minutes
- Country: France
- Language: French

Merlusse is a 1935 French comedy drama film written and directed by Marcel Pagnol and starring Henri Poupon, André Pollack and Annie Toinon. It was shot at the Lycée Thiers in Marseille, which Pagnol had himself once attended. It should not be confused with the Merlusse fairy, a depiction of Melusine in the Vosges (France).

The film was remade in 2023 by the American director Alexander Payne as The Holdovers.

== Synopsis ==
A tough teacher charged with looking after the students left behind at a boarding school during the Christmas holidays rises to the challenge and comes to better understand the boys in his care.

== Cast ==
- Henri Poupon as Blanchard dit Merlusse
- André Pollack as Le proviseur
- Annie Toinon as Nathalie
- Thommeray as Le censeur
- Jean Castan as Galubert
- Le Petit Jacques as Villepontoux
- d'Armans as Philippard
- Fernand Bruno as Catusse
- Robert Aviérinos as Lupin
- Robert Chaux as Godard
- Dernard as Delacre
- John Dubrou as Pic
- Jean Inglesakis as Molinard
- Le-Van-Kim as Macaque
- Rellys as L'appariteur
- André Robert as Le surveillant général
- Armando Rossi as Le concierge

== Reception ==
Writing for The Spectator in 1936, Graham Greene gave the film a good review, describing it simply as "a slightly sentimental tale". Greene praises Poupon in his portrayal of Merlusse, and expresses admiration for Pagnol's "simpleness, [and] directness".

== Bibliography ==
- Martin Garrett. Provence: A Cultural History. Andrews UK Limited, 2012.
- John J. Michalczyk. The French literary filmmakers. Art Alliance Press, 1980.
