= L'Arlésienne (1942 film) =

1942 film

- Directed by: Marc Allégret
- Written by: Marcel Achard (adaptation), Marcel Achard (script),
- Based on: L'Arlésienne by Alphonse Daudet
- Starring: Raimu; Gaby Morlay; Louis Jourdan
- Cinematography: Louis Page
- Edited by: Henri Taverna; Jacqueline Mondollot
- Music by: Georges Bizet
- Release date: 4 September 1942 (France)
- Running time: 105 min
- Country: France
- Language: French

L'Arlésienne is a 1942 French drama film directed by Marc Allégret, starring Raimu and a young Louis Jourdan. It is based on Alphonse Daudet's play L'Arlésienne.

== Plot ==
In the Camargue a local young man named Frédéri (Jourdan) falls in love with a young woman from Arles. His family thinks she is unsuitable as a wife because she had a fling with a soldier. His entourage attempt to cheer him up but he intends to commit suicide.

== Selected Cast ==
- Louis Jourdan as Frédéri
- Raimu as Marc, the boss
- Gaby Morlay as Rose Mamaï
- Édouard Delmont as Balthazar, the shepherd
- Fernand Charpin as Francet Mamaï
- Gisèle Pascal as Vivette
- Charles Moulin as Mitifio, the guardian
- Annie Toinon as the rambler
