= Three Sailors (1934 film) =

- Directed by: Charles Barrois
- Written by: Henri Alibert (operetta); Arnold Lippschitz; René Sarvil (operetta); Raymond Vincy (operetta)
- Starring: Armand Bernard; Betty Stockfeld; Henri Alibert
- Cinematography: Paul Cotteret
- Music by: Vincent Scotto
- Production company: Métropa-Film
- Distributed by: Géxéfilm
- Release date: 19 October 1934
- Running time: 90 minutes
- Country: France
- Language: French

Three Sailors (French: Trois de la marine) is a 1934 French comedy film directed by Charles Barrois and starring Armand Bernard, Betty Stockfeld and Henri Alibert. It was remade in 1957.

== Cast ==
- Armand Bernard as Favouille
- Betty Stockfeld as Dora Davis
- Henri Alibert as Antonin
- Rivers Cadet as Papilotte
- Fernand Charpin as Le commandant
- Betty Daussmond as Mme Delescoubes
- Pierre Larquey as Gruchon
- Germaine Roger as Rosette
- Fernand Flament as Goffic
- Lyne de Souza as Fifi
- Germaine Brière as Mme l'Amirale
- Aya Dalmira as Mercédès
- Eugène Stuber as Le malabar
- Rellys as Le congolin
- Jacques Dumesnil as Stephen Warren
- Jean Clairval
- Paul Amiot

== Bibliography ==
- Goble, Alan. The Complete Index to Literary Sources in Film. Walter de Gruyter, 1999.
