= That's Sport =

1938 film

- Directed by: René Pujol
- Written by: Camille Lemoine; René Pujol
- Produced by: René Pujol
- Starring: Pierre Larquey; Henri Garat; Suzanne Dehelly
- Cinematography: André Bac; Fédote Bourgasoff
- Edited by: Bernard Séjourné
- Music by: Vincent Scotto
- Production company: Latina Films
- Release date: 25 March 1938
- Running time: 86 minutes
- Country: France
- Language: French

That's Sport (French: Ça... c'est du sport) is a 1938 French comedy film directed by René Pujol and starring Pierre Larquey, Henri Garat and Suzanne Dehelly. The film's sets were designed by the art director Émile Duquesne.

== Cast ==
- Pierre Larquey as Trapon
- Henri Garat as Henri Le Gall
- Suzanne Dehelly as Ernestine
- Marguerite Pierry as Mme Lavator
- Jany Briand as Anna
- Jim Gérald as Le directeur du cabaret
- Rellys as Falloche
- Germaine Michel as La concierge
- Alexandre Mihalesco as Joseph Poque

== Bibliography ==
- Bessy, Maurice & Chirat, Raymond. Histoire du cinéma français: 1935-1939. Pygmalion, 1986.
- Crisp, Colin. Genre, Myth and Convention in the French Cinema, 1929-1939. Indiana University Press, 2002.
- Rège, Philippe. Encyclopedia of French Film Directors, Volume 1. Scarecrow Press, 2009.
