= La Fièvre Monte à El Pao =

La fièvre monte à El Pao
- La fièvre monte à El Pao poster
- Directed by: Luis Buñuel
- Written by: Luis Alcoriza; Luis Buñuel
- Produced by: Gregorio Walerstein; Raymond Borderie
- Starring: Gérard Philipe; María Félix; Jean Servais; Miguel Ángel Ferriz
- Cinematography: Gabriel Figueroa
- Distributed by: Films Borderie; Terra Films; Cormoran Films
- Release date: 5 December 1959 (France)
- Running time: 97 minutes
- Country: France
- Language: French
- Box office: 1,591,282 admissions (France)

La fièvre monte à El Pao (also known in English as Fever Mounts at El Pao or Republic of Sin) is a 1959 film by director Luis Buñuel. Gérard Philipe died four months after the filming. This was his last film.

== Plot ==
On the remote Caribbean island Ojeda an agitated population kills their despotic ruler Mariano Vargas. His secretary Ramón Vázquez takes over and tries to reinstate public order. Meanwhile, Alejandro Gual, leader of a special military unit, tries to take the place of Ramón Vázquez. Knowing that Ramón Vázquez had an affair with the dictator's wife Inés, he tries to turn the widow against her lover.

== Cast ==
- Gérard Philipe as Ramón Vázquez
- María Félix as Inés Rojas
- Jean Servais as Alejandro Gual
- Miguel Ángel Ferriz as Gouvernor Mariano Vargas
- Raúl Dantés as Lieutenant García
- Domingo Soler as Professeur Juan Cárdenas
- Víctor Junco as Indarte

== Release ==
In 2008, La Fièvre Monte à El Pao was screened in Retrospective section of the 68th Berlin International Film Festival.

== Reception ==
On review aggregator website Rotten Tomatoes, The Fever Rises in El Pao has an 80% approval rating based on reviews from five critics, with an average score of 7.1/10.
