= La Marseillaise (film) =

- Directed by: Jean Renoir
- Written by: Jean Renoir; Carl Koch; N. Martel-Dreyfus
- Produced by: Jean Renoir
- Starring: Pierre Renoir
- Cinematography: Jean Bourgoin; Alain Douarinou; Jean-Marie Maillols; Jean-Paul Alphen; Jean Louis
- Edited by: Marthe Huguet; Marguerite Renoir
- Music by: Joseph Kosma; Henri Sauveplane
- Distributed by: R.A.C. Distribution
- Release date: 1938
- Running time: 132 minutes
- Country: France
- Language: French

La Marseillaise is a French film of 1938, directed by Jean Renoir. A vast political, social, and military panorama of the French Revolution up to the autumn of 1792, its many episodes range from the life of ordinary working people through the committed bourgeois struggling for change up to those in the upper echelons of society defending the status quo.

== Plot ==
Centred on characters from the rebellious city of Marseille, most of the great events of the Revolution from 1789 to 1792 occur offstage. In Marseille, citizens capture the royal fortress of Fort Saint-Jean and set up a revolutionary council. When war is declared against Austria in April 1792, the city raises a force of 500 volunteers who march to Paris. Entertained there to a banquet, a man from Alsace sings a patriotic ballad which moves the men from Marseille. Adopting it as their marching song, it is soon known as La Marseillaise. In July Prussia joins forces with Austria and the people, enraged by the threats in the Brunswick Manifesto, storm the Tuileries Palace, making prisoners of the King and Queen. A volunteer army then marches east to face the highly professional Prussian forces and in September, to the astonishment of the world, beats them at Valmy.

Fictional characters and happenings are mixed in with historical characters and actual events. While careful to show genuine revolutionaries who wanted constitutional change rather than mob violence or anarchy, as well as privileged people who accepted the need for ordered change, Renoir often uses members of the public to express the ferment of ideas that gripped France.

== Reception ==
On the review ageggrator site Rotten Tomatoes, the film has a 78% score based on 9 reviews.

== Cast ==
- Pierre Renoir as King Louis XVI
- Lise Delamare as Queen Marie-Antoinette
- Georgette Lefebvre as Madame Élisabeth, the King's sister
- Louis Jouvet as Pierre Louis Roederer
- Georges Spanelly as La Chesnaye, commander of the Palace guard
- Léon Larive as Picard, the King's valet
- Elisa Ruis as the Princesse de Lamballe
- William Aguet as de La Rochefoucauld
- Edmond Ardisson as Jean-Joseph Bomier, a mason from Marseille
- Nadia Sibirskaïa as Louison, a young Parisian woman who befriends Bomier
