= André Arbus =

French sculptor

- Born: 17 November 1903; Toulouse, France
- Died: 12 December 1969 (aged 66); Paris, France
- Occupations: Furniture designer, sculptor, architect
- Spouse: Sylva Bernt

André Arbus (1903-1969) was a French furniture designer, sculptor and architect. He was a member of the Académie des Beaux-Arts, and one of his buildings is listed as an official historical monument. He was the recipient of the silver medal at the 1925 International Exhibition of Modern Decorative and Industrial Arts, and the 1934 Prix Blumenthal.

== Early life ==
André Arbus was born on 17 November 1903 in Toulouse, France. His family were furniture designers for generations.

Arbus was educated at the Lycée Pierre-de-Fermat in Toulouse. He graduated from the École des Beaux-Arts in Toulouse.

== Career ==
Arbus was a furniture designer, sculptor and architect. He often with several artists from Toulouse: the designer Georges Soutiras; the painter Marc Saint-Saëns; and sculptors painters Joseph Monin and Henry Parayre.

Arbus exhibited his work at the 1925 International Exhibition of Modern Decorative and Industrial Arts, where he won the silver medal for a lowboy he designed with Marc Saint-Saëns. Meanwhile, his work was also exhibited at the Société des artistes décorateurs and the Salon d'Automne. By 1932, his work was exhibited at the Galerie des Quatre-Chemins in Paris. He won the Prix Blumenthal in 1934.

Arbus designed the new Planier Light in Marseille with André Crillon in 1947.

Arbus became a member of the Académie des Beaux-Arts in 1965.

He was married to Italian sculptor Sylva Bernt.

== Death and legacy ==
Arbus died on 12 December 1969 in Paris.

The Fondation André Arbus was established by his daughter, Madeleine Thorel Arbus, in conjunction with the Fondation de France. It owns the copyright on all pictures of his work.

The Phare du Planier has been listed as an official historical monument by the French Ministry of Culture since September 13, 2012. Meanwhile, his furniture has been auctioned by Sotheby's, Christie's, and Bonhams.

== Honours ==
Officer of the Légion d'honneur
