= Alain Douarinou =

French cinematographer

- Born: 5 March 1909; Saigon, French Indochina
- Died: 3 September 1987 (aged 78); Paimpol, Côtes-d'Armor, France
- Occupation: Cinematographer
- Years active: 1934 - 1975 (film)

Alain Douarinou (1909–1987) was a French cinematographer. He was the younger brother of the art director Jean Douarinou, and was married to Madeleine Sologne.

== Selected filmography ==
- Blanchette (1937)
- The Time of the Cherries (1938)
- The West (1938)
- Place de la Concorde (1939)
- Threats (1940)

== Bibliography ==
- Curti, Roberto. Italian Gothic Horror Films, 1957-1969. McFarland, 2015.
