= Léo Marjane =

French jazz singer and actor

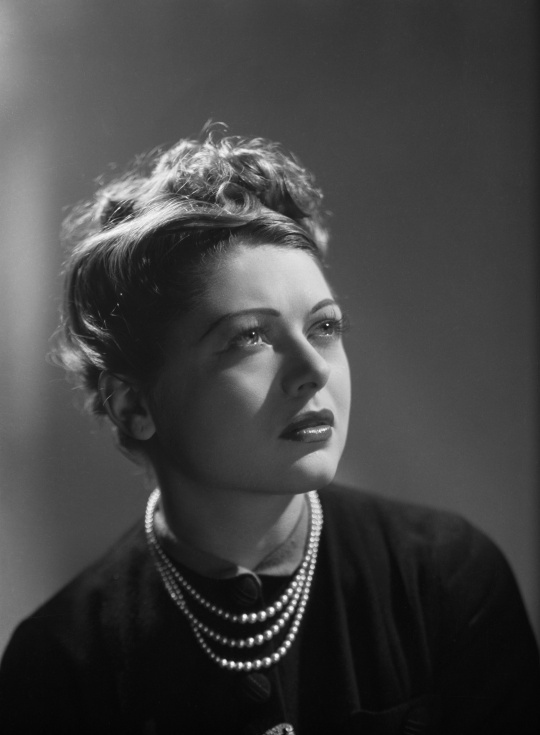
- Marjane in 1940
- Born: Thérèse Maria Léonie Gendebien; 26 August 1912; Boulogne-sur-Mer, France
- Died: 18 December 2016 (aged 104); Barbizon, France
- Occupation: Singer
- Years active: 1931–1957
- Spouse(s): Raymond Gérard; Baron Charles de la Doucette (m. 1957–2007; his death)

Thérèse Maria Léonie Gendebien, known by the stage name Léo Marjane (26 August 1912 – 18 December 2016) was a French singer who reached the peak of her popularity in the late 1930s and early 1940s before her career went into sharp decline after the end of World War II.

== Early life ==
Thérèse Maria Léonie Gendebien was born on 26 August 1912 in Boulogne-sur-Mer, France. Her father was a diplomat.

== Career ==
Marjane began her career in the early 1930s singing in cabarets in Paris. She was noticed for her warm contralto voice and the clarity of her diction, and in 1936 was signed to a contract with the Pathé-Marconi label. Her early recordings – a mixture of original songs and standards of the era such as "Begin the Beguine" and "Night and Day" – were well received and popular. The peak of Marjane's career came in the early 1940s, when she was regarded as one of France's biggest female singing stars. In 1941, she recorded her signature song, the Charles Trenet-penned "Seule ce soir" ("Alone Tonight"), which captured the feelings of the many who were experiencing wartime separation and became one of the best-loved songs of its time.

Marjane's success came to an abrupt halt following the Liberation of France in August 1944. She was accused of having appeared many times at venues frequented by German officers, and her numerous performances on German- and collaborator-controlled Radio Paris were also held against her. Marjane maintained that she had been no more than naïve; nevertheless, in the immediate aftermath of the end of World War II, the allegations and negative publicity in France led her to spend a period of time in England and Belgium, where she was largely unknown.

On her return to France, Marjane resumed her recording career; popular opinion had turned against her, however, and she found little further success. During this period she toured extensively in the United States, Canada and South America, and also had small roles in two films: Les deux gamines (1951) and Jean Renoir's Elena et les hommes (1956).

Marjane's legacy was kept alive by devotees of French song. Subsequent to her retirement from public life, Marjane consistently shunned most requests for television, radio, or published media interviews. She did, however, give an interview to radio channel France Musique shortly before her 90th birthday in 2002.

== Personal life and death ==
Marjane first married Raymond Gérard. After she married Baron Charles de la Doucette in 1957, she retired in Barbizon, outside Paris and devoted herself to horse breeding. She turned 100 in August 2012.

Marjane died on 18 December 2016, aged 104, in Barbizon.
