= Léon David =

French opera singer (1867–1962)

Léon David (18 December 1867, Les Sables d’Olonne, Vendée — 27 October 1962, Les Sables d’Olonne) was a French tenor and voice teacher. Possessing an unusually beautiful vocal timbre, he excelled in lyric tenor roles and was a leading tenor at the Opéra-Comique from 1892 until his retirement from the stage in 1920. He later was a professor of voice at the Conservatoire de Paris from 1924 through 1937.

== Life and career ==
Léon David trained as a singer at the Conservatoire de Nantes and Conservatoire de Paris before making his professional opera debut at the Opéra de Monte-Carlo in February 1892 as Euxenos in Noël Desjoyeaux’s Gyptis. He began a very long tenure as a resident artist at the Opéra-Comique later that year, making his debut at that theatre in June 1892 as Iopas in Les Troyens.

David remained committed to the Opéra-Comique until his retirement from the stage 28 years later in 1920. Among the many roles he performed in operas at that house included Almaviva in Rossini's The Barber of Seville, Don José in Carmen, Georges Brown in François-Adrien Boieldieu's La dame blanche, Gerald in Léo Delibes's Lakmé, Des Grieux in Jules Massenet's Manon, Nadir in Bizet's Les pêcheurs de perles, Vincent in Mireille, Wilhelm Meister in Mignon, and the title role in Massenet's Werther.

In addition to his performance at the Opéra-Comique, David made several guest appearances at La Monnaie from 1900 through 1907; performing roles like Belomonte in Mozart's Die Entführung aus dem Serail and Dimitri in Franco Alfano’s Risurrezione.

After his retirement from performance, David worked as a teacher of singing. He was a professor of voice at the Conservatoire de Paris from 1924 through 1937. One of his pupils was tenor José Luccioni. He later penned the autobiography La Vie d’un ténor which was published in 1950.
