= Rellys =

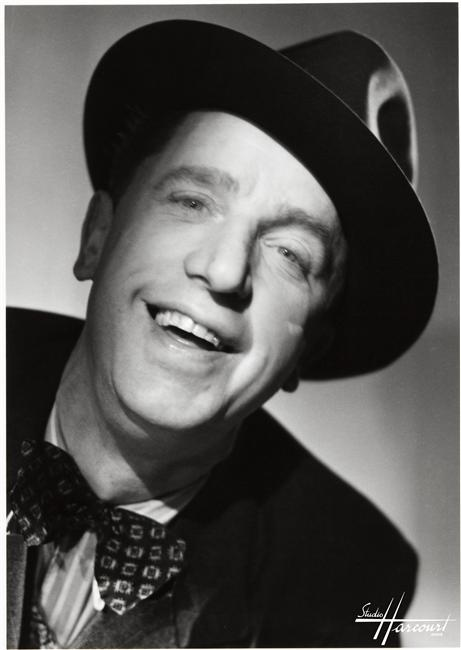
- Born: Henri Marius Bourrelly; 12 December 1905; Marseille, Bouches-du-Rhône, France
- Died: 20 July 1991 (aged 85); Marseille, Bouches-du-Rhône, France
- Occupation: Actor
- Years active: 1933–1982

Henri Marius Roger Bourrelly (12 December 1905 – 20 July 1991), known by his stage name Rellys, was a French actor.

== Selected filmography ==
- Three Sailors (1934)
- Merlusse (1935)
- Happy Arenas (1935)
- That's Sport (1938)
- Narcisse (1940)
- Tobias Is an Angel (1940)
- Frederica (1942)
- The Revenge of Roger (1946)
- The Three Cousins (1947)
- Amédée (1950)
- The Atomic Monsieur Placido (1950)
- Life Is a Game (1951)
- Manon of the Spring (1952)
- Happy Arenas (1958)
- Croesus (1960)
- Cocagne (1961)
- Un soir sur la plage (1961)
- The Trip to Biarritz (1963)
- That Tender Age (1964)
- Dis-moi qui tuer (1965)
- The Gardener of Argenteuil (1966)
