= Henri Alibert =

French actor and singer

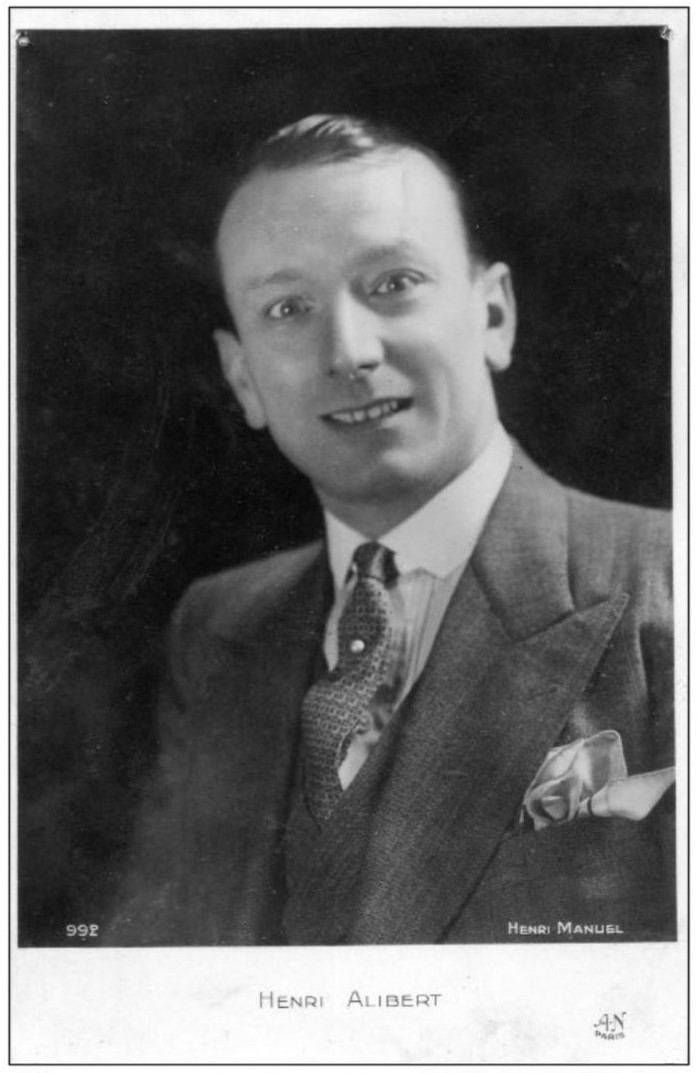
- Born: 3 December 1889; Carpentras, Vaucluse, France
- Died: 23 January 1951 (aged 61); Marseille, Bouches-du-Rhône, France
- Occupations: Actor, singer
- Years active: 1930–1946 (film)

Henri Alibert (December 3, 1889 – January 23, 1951) was a French singer and film actor. He was sometimes credited simply as Alibert. Along with Vincent Scotto he was the driving force behind the Marseille operetta scene. He starred in several films based on his own stage operettas.

== Selected filmography ==
- In the Land of the Sun (1934)
- Three Sailors (1934)
- Happy Arenas (1935)
- The Grand Hotel Affair (1946)

== Bibliography ==
- Goble, Alan. The Complete Index to Literary Sources in Film. Walter de Gruyter, 1999.
- Letellier, Robert Ignatius. Operetta: A Sourcebook, Volume I. Cambridge Scholars Publishing, 2015.
