= Maurice de Canonge =

French actor and film director

- Born: Maurice Camille Louis de Canonge; 18 March 1894; Toulon, France
- Died: 10 January 1979 (aged 84); Paris, France
- Other name: Maurice Cannon
- Occupations: Actor, Director
- Years active: 1917 - 1971 (film)

Maurice de Canonge (March 18, 1894 – January 10, 1979) was a French actor and film director. He is also sometimes known by the name Maurice Cannon.

== Selected filmography ==
=== Director ===
- Stowaway Olive (1931)
- Olive se marie (1931)
- Monsieur cambriole (1931)
- Le secret de l'émeraude (1935)
- Inspector Grey (1936)
- À minuit, le 7 (1937)
- Boulot the Aviator (1937)
- Un soir à Marseille (1938)
- Grisou (1938)
- Saint Theresa of Lisieux (1938)
- Captain Benoit (1938)
- Thérèse Martin (1939)
- The Last Metro (1945)
- Special Mission (1946)
- A Cop (1947)
- Judicial Error (1948)
- La Bataille du feu (1949)
- Last Hour, Special Edition (1949)
- The Man from Jamaica (1950)
- The Two Girls (1951)
- In the Land of the Sun (1952)
- Love Always Love (1952)
- Boum sur Paris (1953)
- The Price of Love (1955)
- Three of the Canebière (1955)
- Three Sailors (1957)
- Judicial Police (1957)
- Happy Arenas (1958)

=== Actor ===
- La nouvelle aurore (1919) - Fric-Frac
- Les parias de l'amour (1921)
- Rapax (1922)
- Trilby (1923) - Zouzou
- Shadows of Paris (1924) - Robert, A Taxi Driver
- The Side Show of Life (1924) - Horatio Bakkus
- The Alaskan (1924) - Tautuk
- Love's Wilderness (1924) - Pierre Bazin
- Peter Pan (1924) - Cookson
- The Little French Girl (1925) - Jerry Hamble
- The Nude Woman (1926) - Rouchard
- Forbidden Hours (1928) - Minor Role (uncredited)
- L'évadée (1929) - Drackson
- Quand nous étions deux (1930) - Rouchard
- Amours viennoises (1931) - Muller
- Les quatre vagabonds (1931) - Novac
- Olive se marie (1931)
- Olive passager clandestin (1931) - Olive
- Un de la montagne (1934) - Le directeur de l'hôtel (uncredited)
- Adémaï in the Middle Ages (1935) - Un officier anglais
- Le coup de trois (1936) - Le marchand de poissons
- The Call of Silence (1936)
- Le grand refrain (1936)
- La bataille du feu (1949)
- Dernière heure, édition spéciale (1949) - (uncredited)
- Me and the Colonel (1958) - Hollander (uncredited)
- The Roots of Heaven (1958) - Haas
- Cervantes (1967)
- Hot Line (1968) - Director of Hotel (uncredited)
- Kill! Kill! Kill! Kill! (1971) - 1st Client (final film role)

== Bibliography ==
- Dayna Oscherwitz & MaryEllen Higgins. The A to Z of French Cinema. Scarecrow Press, 2009.
