= In the Land of the Sun (1934 film) =

1934 film

- Directed by: Robert Péguy
- Written by: Henri Alibert; René Sarvil
- Based on: In the Land of the Sun by Henri Alibert and René Sarvil
- Starring: Henri Alibert; Lisette Lanvin; Pola Illéry
- Cinematography: Willy Faktorovitch; Nicolas Hayer
- Music by: Vincent Scotto
- Production company: Les Productions Miramar
- Release date: 2 February 1934
- Running time: 79 minutes
- Country: France
- Language: French

In the Land of the Sun (French: Au pays du soleil) is a 1934 French musical comedy crime film directed by Robert Péguy and starring Henri Alibert, Lisette Lanvin and Pola Illéry. An operetta film, it is based on the 1932 operetta of the same title by Alibert. It was later remade into a 1952 film In the Land of the Sun starring Tino Rossi.

== Synopsis ==
Near the waterfront in Marseille, a murder is committed near a bar frequented by sailors. Titin is wrongly charged with the murder, to the distress of his girlfriend.

== Cast ==
- Henri Alibert as Titin
- Lisette Lanvin as Miette
- Fernand Flament as Nervi
- Pola Illéry as La petite poule
- René Sarvil as Un policier
- Gorlett as Le gars du milieu
- Edmond Castel as Chichois

== Bibliography ==
- Bessy, Maurice & Chirat, Raymond. Histoire du cinéma français: 1929-1934. Pygmalion, 1988.
- Crisp, Colin. Genre, Myth and Convention in the French Cinema, 1929-1939. Indiana University Press, 2002.
- Goble, Alan. The Complete Index to Literary Sources in Film. Walter de Gruyter, 1999.
- Rège, Philippe. Encyclopedia of French Film Directors, Volume 1. Scarecrow Press, 2009.
