= Vincent Scotto =

French composer (1874–1952)

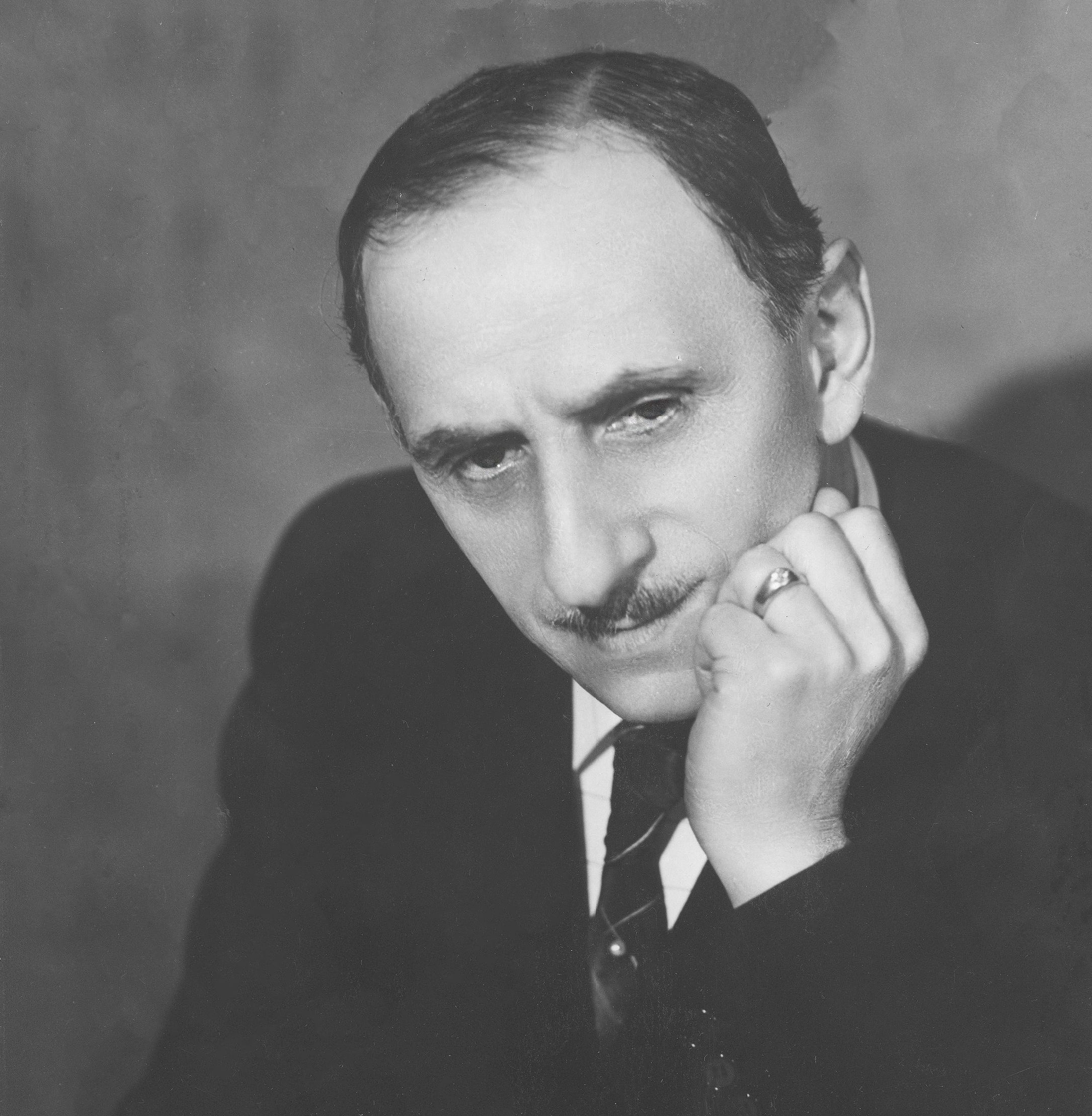
- Born: 21 April 1874; Marseille, France
- Died: 15 November 1952 (aged 78); Paris, France
- Occupation: Composer

Vincent Scotto (21 April 1874 – 15 November 1952) was a French composer.

== Biography ==
=== Early life ===
Vincent Scotto was born on 21 April 1874 in Marseille to Pasquale Scotto d'Aniello and Antonia Intartaglia, from the island of Procida, north of the Gulf of Naples.

=== Career ===
He started his career in Marseille in 1906 and later moved to Paris. Over the course of a lifetime, he wrote 4,000 songs as well as 60 operettas. He was friends with Marcel Pagnol and wrote music for his films. Over time, he wrote music for about fifty films in the 1940s and 1950s, and he sometimes appeared in them as an actor.

In 1973, a biographical TV film was broadcast, La Vie rêvée de Vincent Scotto.

=== Death ===
He died on 15 November 1952 in Paris.

== Legacy ==
Bust of Vincent Scotto by André Arbus on the Place aux Huiles, Marseille, France

- A bust of Vincent Scotto by sculptor André Arbus (1903–1969) can be found facing the Vieux Port in Place aux Huiles, Marseille.
- The Square Vincent Scotto in Aix-en-Provence is named for him.

== Honors and awards ==
Officer of the Order of Legion of Honour (1950)

== Selected filmography ==
- The Sweetness of Loving (1930)
- The Adventurer of Tunis (1931)
- Kiss Me (1932)
- To the Polls, Citizens (1932)
- Clochard (1932)
- Bach the Millionaire (1933)
- The Agony of the Eagles (1933)
- Three Sailors (1934)
- In the Land of the Sun (1934)
- Merlusse (1935)
- His Excellency Antonin (1935)
- Happy Arenas (1935)
- Little One (1935)
- Marinella (1936)
- Charley's Aunt (1936)
- Bach the Detective (1936)
- Topaze (1936)
- Cinderella (1937)
- The Kiss of Fire (1937)
- Monsieur Bégonia (1937)
- Blanchette (1937)
- Romarin (1937)
- Sarati the Terrible (1937)
- Mirages (1938)
- That's Sport (1938)
- Prince of My Heart (1938)
- If You Return (1938)
- The Gutter (1938)
- Monsieur Brotonneau (1939)
- My Aunt the Dictator (1939)
- Strange Suzy (1941)
- Madame Sans-Gêne (1941)
- The Chain Breaker (1941)
- Romance for Three (1942)
- The Law of Spring (1942)
- Room 13 (1942)
- Domino (1943)
- Mistral (1943)
- Song of the Clouds (1946)
- The Grand Hotel Affair (1946)
- Counter Investigation (1947)
- Woman Without a Past (1948)
- If It Makes You Happy (1948)
- Colomba (1948)
- My Aunt from Honfleur (1949)
- The Little Zouave (1950)
- Three Sailors in a Convent (1950)
- Minne (1950)
- Adele's Gift (1951)
- The Little Cardinals (1951)
- That Rascal Anatole (1951)
- The Priest of Saint-Amour (1952)
- In the Land of the Sun (1952)
- When Do You Commit Suicide? (1953)
