= René Sarvil =

French actor (1901–1975)

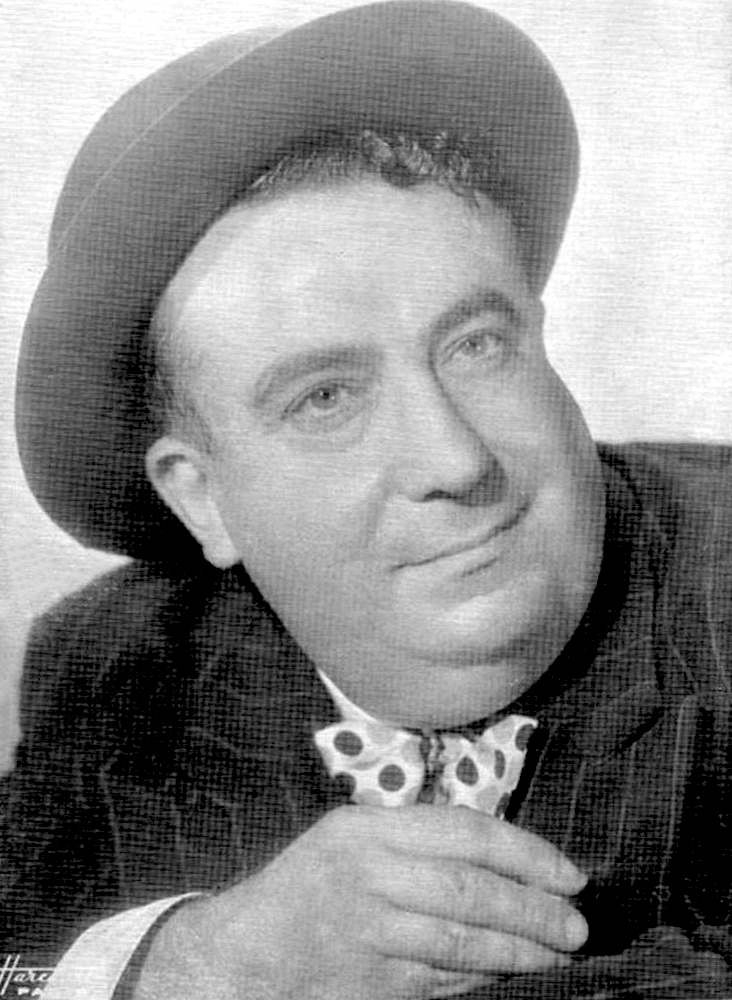
René Sarvil

René Crescenzo (18 January 1901 in Toulon – 31 March 1975 in Marseille), known professionally as René Sarvil, was a French actor and songwriter.

== Partial filmography ==
- In the Land of the Sun (1934)
- Notre-Dame de la Mouise (1941)
- Cyrano de Bergerac (1946)
- Oriental Port (1950)
- Sergil Amongst the Girls (1952)
- In the Land of the Sun (1952)
- Manon of the Spring (1952)
- The Impure Ones (1954)
- Letters from My Windmill (1954)
- House on the Waterfront (1955)
- Three Sailors (1957)
- Happy Arenas (1958)
- La belle Américaine (1961)
