= Marc Saint-Saëns =

French printmaker (1903–1979)

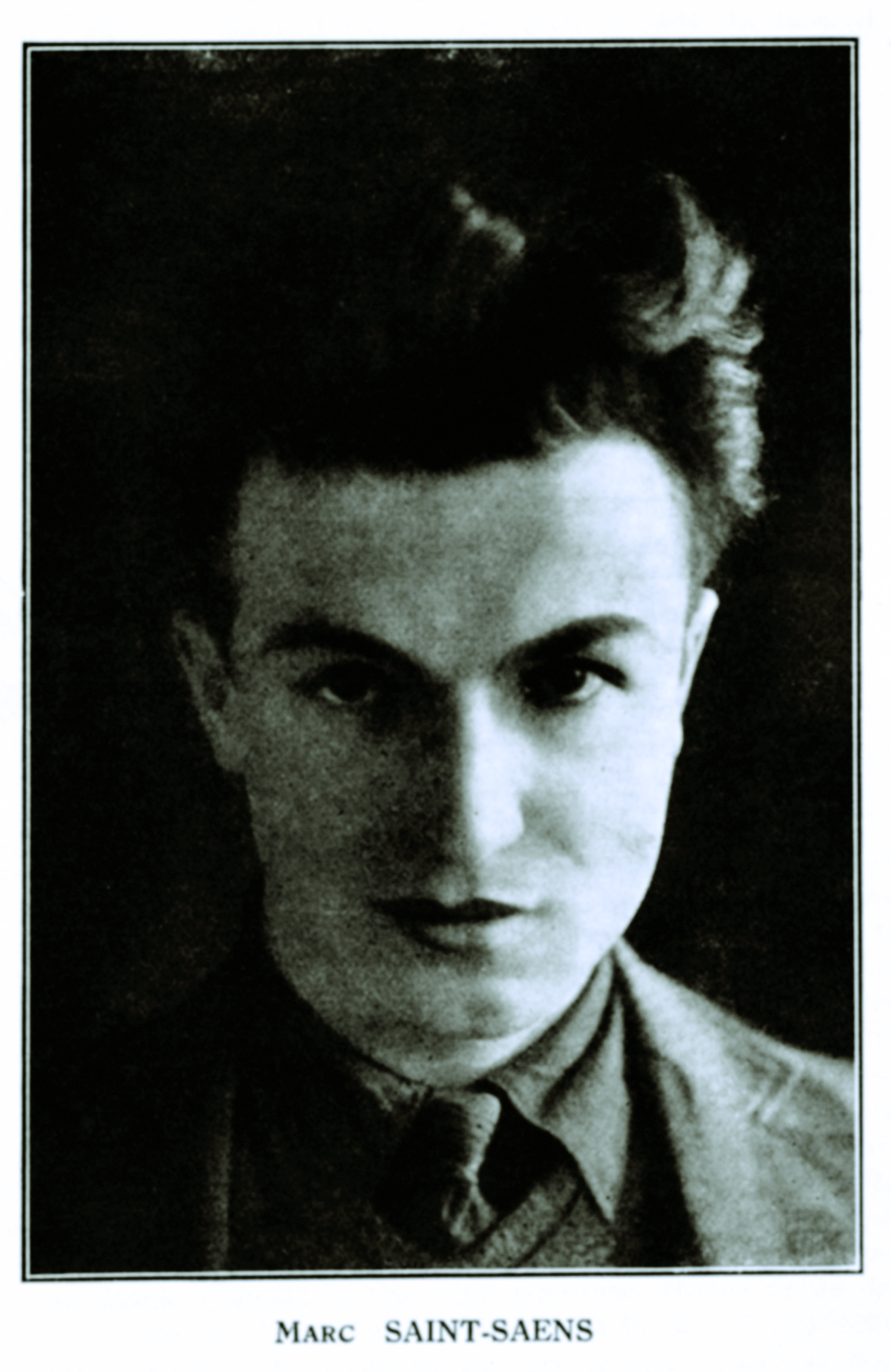
Marc Saint-Saëns, 1935

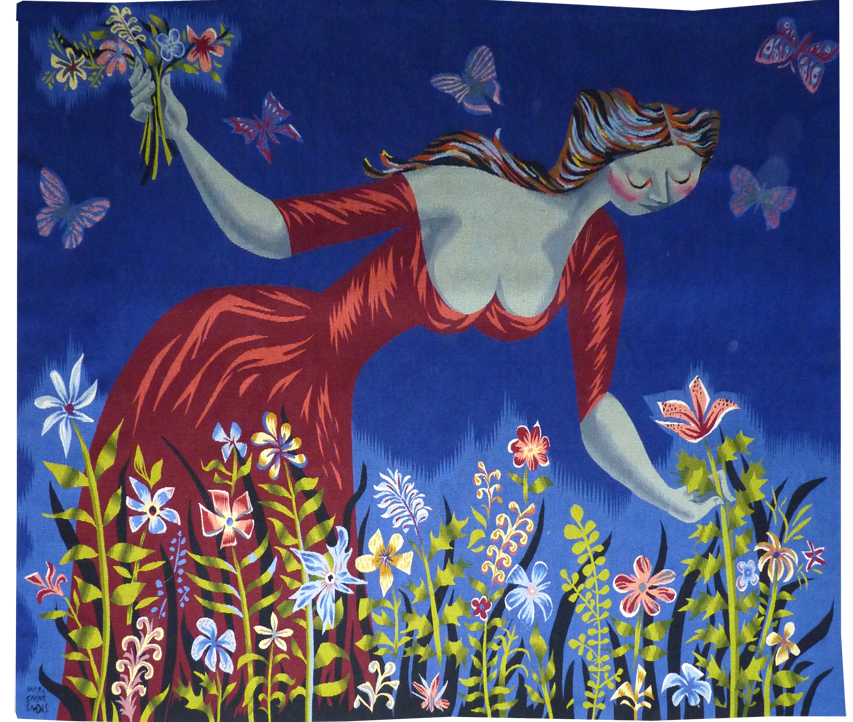
Lady Melanie's Bouquet, by Marc Saint-Saëns, 1951.

Marcel Léon Saint-Saëns (1903–1979), better known under the pseudonym Marc Saint-Saëns, was a French printmaker.

Le Bouquet (1951) by Marc Saint-Saëns is among the best and most representative French tapestries of the Fifties. It is a tribute to Marc Saint-Saëns's predilection for scenes from nature and rustic life.
