= 16th César Awards =

1991 French film awards ceremony

- Date: 9 March 1991
- Site: Théâtre des Champs-Élysées, Paris, France
- Hosted by: Richard Bohringer

Highlights
- Best Film: Cyrano de Bergerac
- Best Actor: Gérard Depardieu
- Best Actress: Anne Parillaud

Television coverage
- Network: Antenne 2

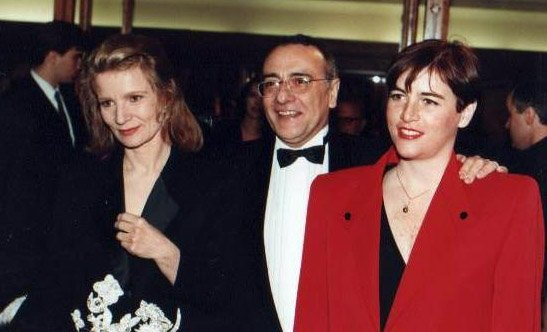
Yves Mourousi and his wife, with Nicole Garcia, at the 16th César ceremony

The 16th César Awards ceremony, presented by the Académie des Arts et Techniques du Cinéma, honoured the best French films of 1990 and took place on 9 March 1991 at the Théâtre des Champs-Élysées in Paris. The ceremony was chaired by Sophia Loren and hosted by Richard Bohringer. Cyrano de Bergerac won the award for Best Film.

During the ceremony, Vanessa Paradis mistakenly announced Judith Godrèche as the winner of Best Newcomer (Female) instead of Judith Henry, then quickly corrected herself.

== Winners and nominees ==
The winners are highlighted in bold:

- Best Film:
  **Cyrano de Bergerac**, directed by Jean-Paul Rappeneau
  Le Mari de la coiffeuse, directed by Patrice Leconte
  Nikita, directed by Luc Besson
  Le Petit criminel, directed by Jacques Doillon
  Uranus, directed by Claude Berri
- Best Foreign Film:
  **Dead Poets Society**, directed by Peter Weir
  Goodfellas, directed by Martin Scorsese
  Pretty Woman, directed by Garry Marshall
  Taksi-Blyuz, directed by Pavel Lungin
  ¡Átame!, directed by Pedro Almodóvar
- Best First Work:
  **La Discrète**, directed by Christian Vincent
  Asfour Stah, directed by Férid Boughedir
  L'Autre, directed by Bernard Giraudeau
  Mado, poste restante, directed by Aleksandr Adabashyan
  Outremer, directed by Brigitte Roüan
  Un week-end sur deux, directed by Nicole Garcia
- Best Actor:
  **Gérard Depardieu**, for Cyrano de Bergerac
  Fabrice Luchini, for La Discrète
  Michel Serrault, for Docteur Petiot
  Daniel Auteuil, for Lacenaire
  Jean Rochefort, for Le Mari de la coiffeuse
  Michel Piccoli, for Milou en Mai
- Best Actress:
  **Anne Parillaud**, for Nikita
  Anne Brochet, for Cyrano de Bergerac
  Miou-Miou, for Milou en mai
  Tsilla Chelton, for Tatie Danielle
  Nathalie Baye, for Un week-end sur deux
- Best Supporting Actor:
  **Jacques Weber**, for Cyrano de Bergerac
  Maurice Garrel, for La Discrète
  Michel Duchaussoy, for Milou en mai
  Michel Galabru, for Uranus
  Daniel Prévost, for Uranus
- Best Supporting Actress:
  **Dominique Blanc**, for Milou en mai
  Thérèse Liotard, for La Gloire de mon père and Le Château de ma mère
  Odette Laure, for Daddy Nostalgie
  Catherine Jacob, for Tatie Danielle
  Danièle Lebrun, for Uranus
- Best Newcomer (Male)
  **Gérald Thomassin – (Le Petit criminel)**
  Alex Descas – (S'en fout la mort)
  Marc Duret – Nikita
  Vincent Pérez – (Cyrano de Bergerac)
  Philippe Uchan – (Le Château de ma mère)
- Best Newcomer (Female)
  **Judith Henry – (La Discrète)**
  Clotilde Courau – (Le Petit criminel)
  lorence Darel – Uranus
  Judith Godrèche – (La Désenchantée)
  Isabelle Nanty –(Tatie Danielle)
- Best Director:
  **Jean-Paul Rappeneau**, for Cyrano de Bergerac
  Patrice Leconte, for Le Mari de la coiffeuse
  Luc Besson, for Nikita
  Jacques Doillon, for Le Petit criminel
  Claude Berri, for Uranus
- Best Original Screenplay or Adaptation:
  **Christian Vincent, Jean-Pierre Ronssin**, for La Discrète
  Jean-Claude Carrière, Jean-Paul Rappeneau, for Cyrano de Bergerac
  Claude Klotz, Patrice Leconte, for Le Mari de la coiffeuse
  Jacques Doillon, for Le Petit criminel
- Best Cinematography:
  **Pierre Lhomme**, for Cyrano de Bergerac
  Eduardo Serra, for Le Mari de la coiffeuse
  Thierry Arbogast, for Nikita
- Best Costume Design:
  **Franca Squarciapino**, for Cyrano de Bergerac
  Agnès Nègre, for La Gloire de mon père and Le Château de ma mère
  Yvonne Sassinot de Nesle, for Lacenaire
- Best Sound:
  **Pierre Gamet, Dominique Hennequin**, for Cyrano de Bergerac
  Michel Barlier, Pierre Befve, Gérard Lamps, for Nikita
  Henri Morelle, Pierre-Alain Besse, François Musy, for Nouvelle vague
- Best Editing:
  **Noëlle Boisson**, for Cyrano de Bergerac
  Joëlle Hache, for Le Mari de la coiffeuse
  Olivier Mauffroy, for Nikita
- Best Music:
  **Jean-Claude Petit**, for Cyrano de Bergerac
  Vladimir Cosma, for La Gloire de mon père and Le Château de ma mère
  Éric Serra, for Nikita
- Best Production Design:
  **Ezio Frigerio**, for Cyrano de Bergerac
  Ivan Maussion, for Le Mari de la coiffeuse
  Dan Weil, for Nikita
- Best Fiction Short Film:
  **Things I Like, Things I Don't Like (Foutaises)**, directed by Jean-Pierre Jeunet
  Deux pièces/cuisine, directed by Philippe Harel
  Final, directed by Irène Jouannet
  Uhloz, directed by Guy Jacques
- Best Documentary Short Film:
  **La Valise**, directed by François Amado
  Tai ti chan, directed by Chi Yan Wong
- Honorary César:
  **Jean-Pierre Aumont**
  **Sophia Loren**

== See also ==
- 63rd Academy Awards
- 44th British Academy Film Awards
