= List of French films of 1990 =

A list of films produced in France in 1990.

Title	Director	Cast	Genre	Notes
Les 1001 Nuits	Philippe de Broca	Catherine Zeta-Jones, Thierry Lhermitte, Gérard Jugnot	Fantasy	French–Italian co-production
Baby Blood	Alain Robak	Emmanuelle Escourrou, Jean-François Gallotte, Christian Sinniger	Horror	
Captive of the Desert	Raymond Depardon	Sandrine Bonnaire	Drama	
Cyrano de Bergerac	Jean-Paul Rappeneau	Gérard Depardieu, Anne Brochet, Vincent Perez	Drama, romance	
Daddy Nostalgia	Bertrand Tavernier	Dirk Bogarde, Jane Birkin, Odette Laure	Drama	
Europa Europa	Agnieszka Holland	Marco Hofschneider, Julie Delpy, André Wilms	Drama	French–German co-production
Everybody's Fine	Giuseppe Tornatore	Marcello Mastroianni, Michèle Morgan, Valeria Cavalli	Comedy-drama	Italian–French co-production
La Femme Nikita	Luc Besson	Anne Parillaud, Jean-Hugues Anglade, Tchéky Karyo	Thriller	French–Italian co-production
Green Card	Peter Weir	Gérard Depardieu, Andie MacDowell	Romantic comedy-drama	French-Australian-American co-production
The Hairdresser's Husband	Patrice Leconte	Jean Rochefort, Anna Galiena, Henry Hocking	Comedy-drama, romance	
Halfaouine: Boy of the Terraces	Férid Boughedir	Selim Boughedir, Mustapha Adouani, Rabiah Ben-Abdullah	Drama, Comedy	Tunisian-French-Italian co-production
Hamlet	Franco Zeffirelli	Mel Gibson, Glenn Close, Alan Bates, Paul Scofield, Ian Holm, Helena Bonham Carter	Drama	
Henry & June	Philip Kaufman	Fred Ward, Uma Thurmanl Maria de Medeiros, Richard E. Grant, Kevin Spacey	Biographical drama	American-French co-production
Il y a des jours... et des lunes	Claude Lelouch	Gérard Lanvin, Patrick Chesnais, Vincent Lindon	Comedy-drama	
The Little Gangster	Jacques Doillon	Richard Anconina, Gerald Thomassin, Clotilde Courau	Drama	
May Fools	Louis Malle	Miou-Miou, Michel Piccoli, Michel Duchaussoy	Comedy	French–Italian co-production
My Father's Glory	Yves Robert	Philippe Caubère, Nathalie Roussel, Didier Pain	Drama	
My Mother's Castle	Yves Robert	Julien Ciamaca, Philippe Caubère, Nathalie Roussel	Drama	
Nouvelle Vague	Jean-Luc Godard	Alain Delon, Domiziana Giordano, Roland Amstutz	Avant-garde, fantasy	French–Swiss co-production
Quiet Days in Clichy	Claude Chabrol	Andrew McCarthy, Nigel Havers, Barbara de Rossi	Drama	French–Italian–West German co-production
A Tale of Springtime	Éric Rohmer	Anne Teyssedre, Hugues Quester, Florence Darel	Comedy-drama	
Tatie Danielle	Étienne Chatiliez	Tsilla Chelton, Catherine Jacob, Éric Prat	Comedy	
Taxi Blues	Pavel Lungin	Petr Mamonov, Piotr Zaitchenko, Vladimir Kachpur	Drama	Soviet–French co-production
Tumultes	Bertrand Van Effenterre			Screened at the 1990 Cannes Film Festival
Uranus	Claude Berri	Philippe Noiret, Gérard Depardieu, Jean-Pierre Marielle	Comedy-drama	
La vengeance d'une femme	Jacques Doillon	Isabelle Huppert		Entered into the 40th Berlin International Film Festival
Vincent and Me	Michael Rubbo	Nina Petronzio, Tchéky Karyo, Christopher Forrest	Comedy	Canadian–French co-production

== Notes ==
=== References ===
- Muir, John Kenneth (2011). Horror Films of the 1990s. McFarland. ISBN 978-0-7864-4012-2.
