= The Well-Digger's Daughter =

The Well-Digger's Daughter may refer to:

- The Well-Digger's Daughter (1940 film), by Marcel Pagnol
- The Well-Digger's Daughter (2011 film), by Daniel Auteuil
