= Richard Corliss =

American editor and film critic for Time magazine

- Born: Richard Nelson Corliss; March 6, 1944; Philadelphia, Pennsylvania, U.S.
- Died: April 23, 2015 (aged 71); New York City, U.S.
- Education: St. Joseph's College; Columbia University; New York University
- Occupations: Editor, writer, critic
- Years active: 1966–2015
- Employers: Film Comment, journal published by the Film Society of Lincoln Center 1970–1980; Time Magazine 1980–2015
- Notable work: Talking Pictures: Screenwriters in American Cinema; Greta Garbo (A Pyramid illustrated history of the movies); 1980 cover story on Dallas's "Who Shot J.R.?"
- Spouse: Mary Elizabeth Yushak (m. 1969)

Richard Nelson Corliss (March 6, 1944 – April 23, 2015) was an American film critic and editor for Time.

He was the editor-in-chief of Film Comment and authored several books. In Talking Pictures, he challenged the auteur theory, popularized by his teacher Andrew Sarris. With his colleague Richard Schickel, he made Time's All-Time 100 Movies list.

== Personal life and background ==
Corliss was born in 1944 in Philadelphia, Pennsylvania, the son of Elizabeth Brown (née McCluskey) and Paul William Corliss. He attended St. Joseph's College, Philadelphia (now Saint Joseph's University), obtaining a bachelor's degree, before progressing to Columbia University to earn a master's degree in film studies. Corliss was one of Andrew Sarris's students at New York University; he challenged Sarris's idea of the Director as auteur (author). The two remained friends until Sarris' death. Corliss resided in New York City with his wife, Mary, whom he married on Sunday, August 31, 1969. Mary was formerly a curator in the Film Stills Archive of the Museum of Modern Art.

In a 1990 article, Corliss mentions his mother clipping movie ads with quotes of his and posting them to her refrigerator door.

On April 23, 2015, Corliss died under hospice care in New York City after suffering a stroke. He was 71.

== Career ==
Corliss wrote for National Review from 1966 to 1970. Despite working for the conservative publication, Corliss was a self-described "liberal".

At Film Comment, Corliss helped draw attention to the screenwriter in the creation of movies. Corliss brought Jonathan Rosenbaum to Film Comment as a Paris correspondent. In 1980, Corliss joined Time. In 1982, he profiled Steven Spielberg, covering the release of E.T. the Extra-Terrestrial and Poltergeist. Although he started as an associate editor, he was promoted to senior writer by 1985.

Corliss wrote for Time online and in print, including a column about nostalgic pop culture, That Old Feeling. He was an occasional guest on The Charlie Rose Show, commenting on new releases with Janet Maslin and David Denby. His last appearance on the show was in December 2005. Corliss also appeared on A&E Biography to talk about the life and work of Jackie Chan and appeared in Richard Schickel's documentary about Warner Brothers.

Corliss attended the Cannes Film Festival along with Roger Ebert and Todd McCarthy for the longest period of any US journalist. He also attended festivals in Toronto and Venice. Corliss used to work on the board of the New York Film Festival but resigned in 1987 after longtime head Richard Roud was fired due to his challenging of editorial direction of the festival. He was fond of word play; in a 1993 review of The Crying Game, he spelled out a subtle spoiler with the first letters of each paragraph.

Lolita, Corliss's third book, was a study of Vladimir Nabokov's novel and Stanley Kubrick's film. Later Corliss wrote an introductory essay for Crouching Tiger, Hidden Dragon: A Portrait of the Ang Lee Film.

Corliss admired animation, particulalry Pixar. With the release of Ratatouille, Corliss had access to the studio's inner workings. Pixar director Brad Bird said that he has "got nothing against critics" and that he had "done very well with them, over the years." Corliss and Martin Scorsese first came up with the idea for the issue on "guilty pleasures".

Corliss and Richard Schickel made Time's All-Time 100 Movies list. Corliss created lists of the 25 greatest villains, the 25 best horror films and the 25 most important films on race. In addition Corliss was on the 2001 jury for AFI's 100 Greatest movies list.

In the 2012 Sight & Sound poll, Corliss cast votes for Chungking Express, Citizen Kane, Historie(s) du Cinema, The Lady Eve, Mouchette, Pyaasa, The Searchers, The Seventh Seal and WALL-E.

== Conflict and criticism ==
Corliss was critical of the escalating expenditure on action films, writing in his review of Terminator 2: Judgment Day (1991) that "the cost of the product is not passed on to the consumer. Moviegoers pay as much for a ticket to a no-budget documentary like Paris Is Burning (1990) as they do for admission to any superspectacle."

Corliss had movies on his top ten lists that fellow Time critic Richard Schickel rated the worst of the year. These included 2001's Moulin Rouge!, 2003's Cold Mountain and 2004's Eternal Sunshine of the Spotless Mind. In August 2004, Stephen King, criticizing what he saw as a growing trend of leniency towards films by critics, included Corliss among a number of "formerly reliable critics who seem to have gone remarkably soft – not to say softhearted and sometimes softheaded – in their old age."

Corliss appears in the 2009 documentary film For the Love of Movies: The Story of American Film Criticism, confessing that he was the film critic who, in the 1970s, coined the term "Paulettes" for the ardent followers of Pauline Kael, a label which has stuck.

Corliss criticized Siskel and Ebert in Film Comment with "All Thumbs?: Or, Is There a Future For Film Criticism?", and Ebert responded with "All Stars: Or Is There a Cure For Criticism?" Corliss praised Ebert in a June 23, 2007 article "Thumbs up for Roger Ebert." Corliss's dialogue with Ebert in Film Comment was reprinted in Ebert's Awake in the Dark: The Best of Roger Ebert. Corliss appeared in the Ebert documentary Life Itself, where he praised Ebert's "polymathic genius."

== Number Ones from Corliss' Top-Tens ==
Best English language film in parentheses:

- 1969: Midnight Cowboy
- 1980: Mon Oncle d'Amerique (The Elephant Man)
- 1981: The Mystery of Oberwald (Thief)
- 1982: E.T. the Extra-Terrestrial
- 1983: Berlin Alexanderplatz (The Big Chill)
- 1986: The Fly
- 1988: The Singing Detective
- 1989: Distant Voices, Still Lives
- 1990: L'Atalante (re-release) (Internal Affairs)
- 1991: My Father's Glory and My Mother's Castle (The Simpsons: "Lisa's Substitute")
- 1992: The Simpsons: "Black Widower"
- 1993: The Age of Innocence
- 1994: Pulp Fiction
- 1995: Persuasion
- 1997: Ponette (Chasing Amy)
- 2001: Kandahar (Moulin Rouge!)
- 2002: Talk to Her (Gangs of New York)
- 2003: Lord of the Rings: The Return of the King
- 2004: Hero and House of Flying Daggers (Sideways)
- 2005: The White Diamond (The Squid and the Whale)
- 2006: Pan's Labyrinth (Borat)
- 2007: No Country for Old Men
- 2008: WALL-E
- 2009: The Princess and the Frog
- 2010: Toy Story 3
- 2011: The Artist (Hugo in second place)
- 2012: Amour (Beasts of the Southern Wild)
- 2013: Gravity
- 2014: The Grand Budapest Hotel

== Bibliography ==
=== Books ===
- Corliss, Richard (1974). Talking pictures : screenwriters in the American cinema, 1927-1973. Woodstock, N.Y.: Overlook Press.
- Greta Garbo (1974)
- Lolita (1995)
- Mom in the Movies: The Iconic Screen Mothers You Love (and a Few You Love to Hate) (2014)

=== Articles ===
- Corliss, Richard (April 20, 2015). "Date with an android : two guys and a robot square off in Alex Garland's Ex Machina". The Culture. Reviews. Time. Vol. 185, no. 14 (South Pacific ed.). p. 45.
