= Thérèse Liotard =

French actress (1946–2026)

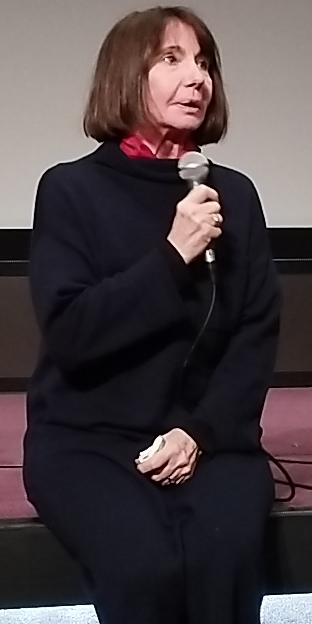
- Liotard in 2023
- Born: 6 May 1946; Lille, Nord, France
- Died: 23 May 2026 (aged 80)
- Occupation: Actress
- Years active: 1970–2013
- Known for: Bergerac – as Danielle Aubry

Thérèse Liotard (6 May 1946 – 23 May 2026) was a French actress best known for her role in the 1977 Agnès Varda film One Sings, the Other Doesn't and the 1990 film My Father's Glory (based on La Gloire de mon père by Marcel Pagnol). She was also known on British television for her appearance in the BBC series Bergerac.

Liotard made her French television debut as a presenter on ORTF in 1970.

In the 1980 film Death Watch, her English dialogue was dubbed by Julie Christie.

Liotard died on 23 May 2026, at the age of 80.

== Filmography ==
See also Thérèse Liotard, full filmography and theatre appearances

Partial list of acting performances in film and television
Title	Year	Role	Notes	Source
One Sings, the Other Doesn't	1977	Suzanne	L'une chante, l'autre pas by Agnès Varda	
Death Watch	1980	Tracey	La Mort en direct by Bertrand Tavernier	
Viens chez moi, j'habite chez une copine	1981	Françoise	Viens chez moi, j'habite chez une copine by Patrice Leconte	
Bergerac	1983, 1990–1991	Danielle Aubry	TV series	
A Boy from Calabria	1987	Mariuccia	Un ragazzo di Calabria	
A Few Days With Me	1988	Régine	Quelques jours avec moi	
My Father's Glory	1990	Tante Rose	La Gloire de mon père	
My Mother's Castle	1990	Tante Rose	Le Château de ma mère	
L'Irlandaise	1991	Liliane	TV movie	
No Scandal	1999	Mme Guérin	Pas de scandale	

== Awards ==
- 16th César Awards, nomination for best supporting actress for My Father's Glory and My Mother's Castle
