= La Treille =

Coordinates: 43°18′49″N 5°30′45″E

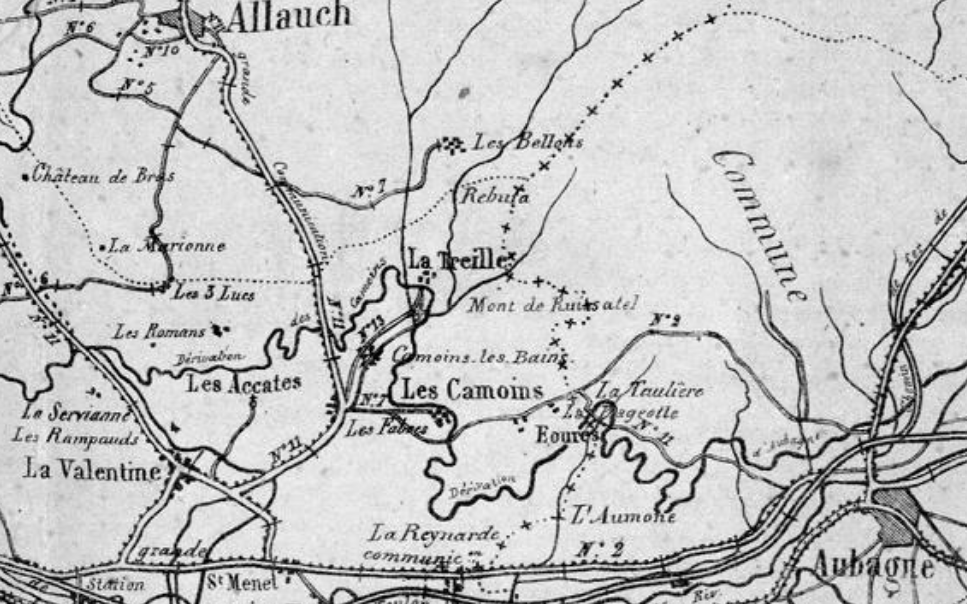
Detail of 1877 map of Marseille showing La Treille with neighbouring towns and villages and the twisting contours of the Canal de Marseille

La Treille (French pronunciation: [la tʁɛj]) is a quartier on the outskirts of the 11th arrondissement of Marseille, in the department of Bouches-du-Rhône, France. It has approximately 900 inhabitants. At the centre of the quartier is the seventeenth century hillside village of La Treille.

== Overview ==
La Treille became famous as the place where writer Marcel Pagnol spent his summer holidays during his childhood—at the Bastide Neuve—and he is buried in the cemetery there. This is also where La Pascaline—the house where Pagnol started to write Souvenirs d'enfance (La Gloire de mon père and Le Château de ma mère)—is located. Pagnol's early films used the village as a backdrop and its inhabitants as actors: it has only slightly changed since then. Behind the church, in the main square or placette, is a small fountain, used as Manon's fountain in Pagnol's 1952 film version of Manon des Sources.

The village is situated at the start of the range of hills containing the Garlaban. This countryside featured prominently in Pagnol's books about his childhood and is now known in France as La Pagnolie. It can be explored on footpaths starting at the end of the chemin des Bellons, the main street in the village. A section of the Canal de Marseille passes below the village, which is served by the public transport system of Marseille and accessible also from Aubagne.

== Gallery ==
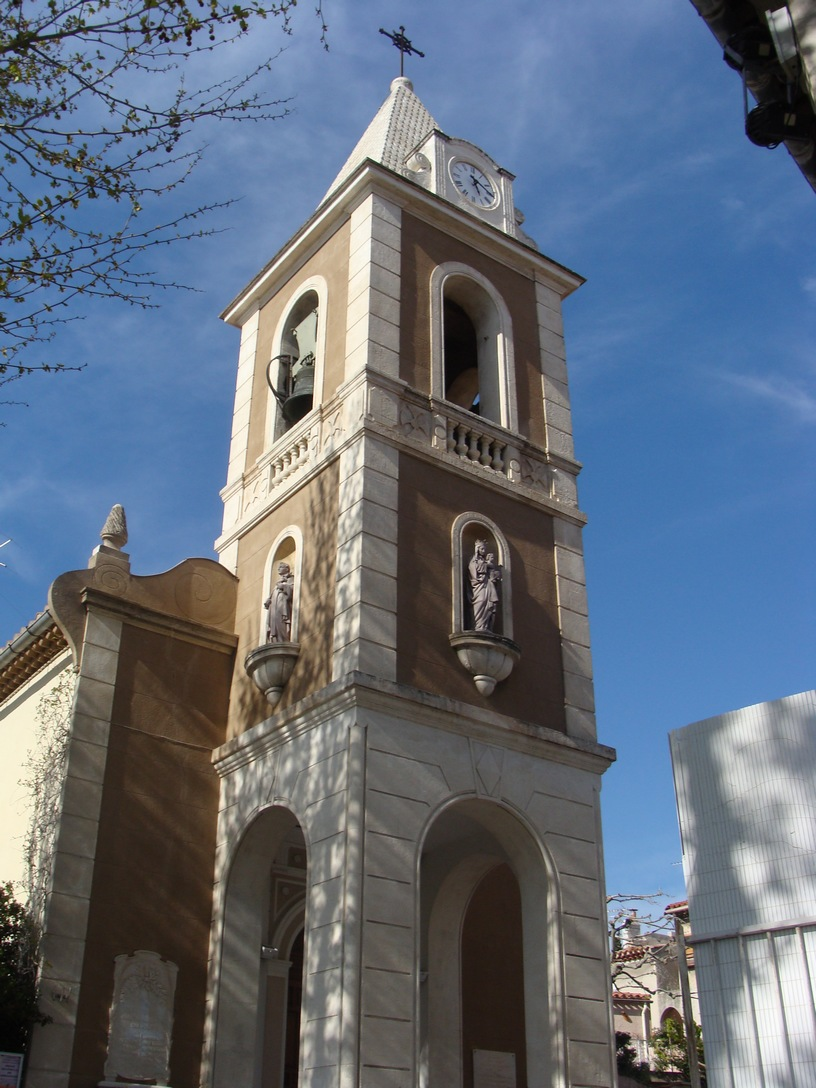
The village church in La Treille

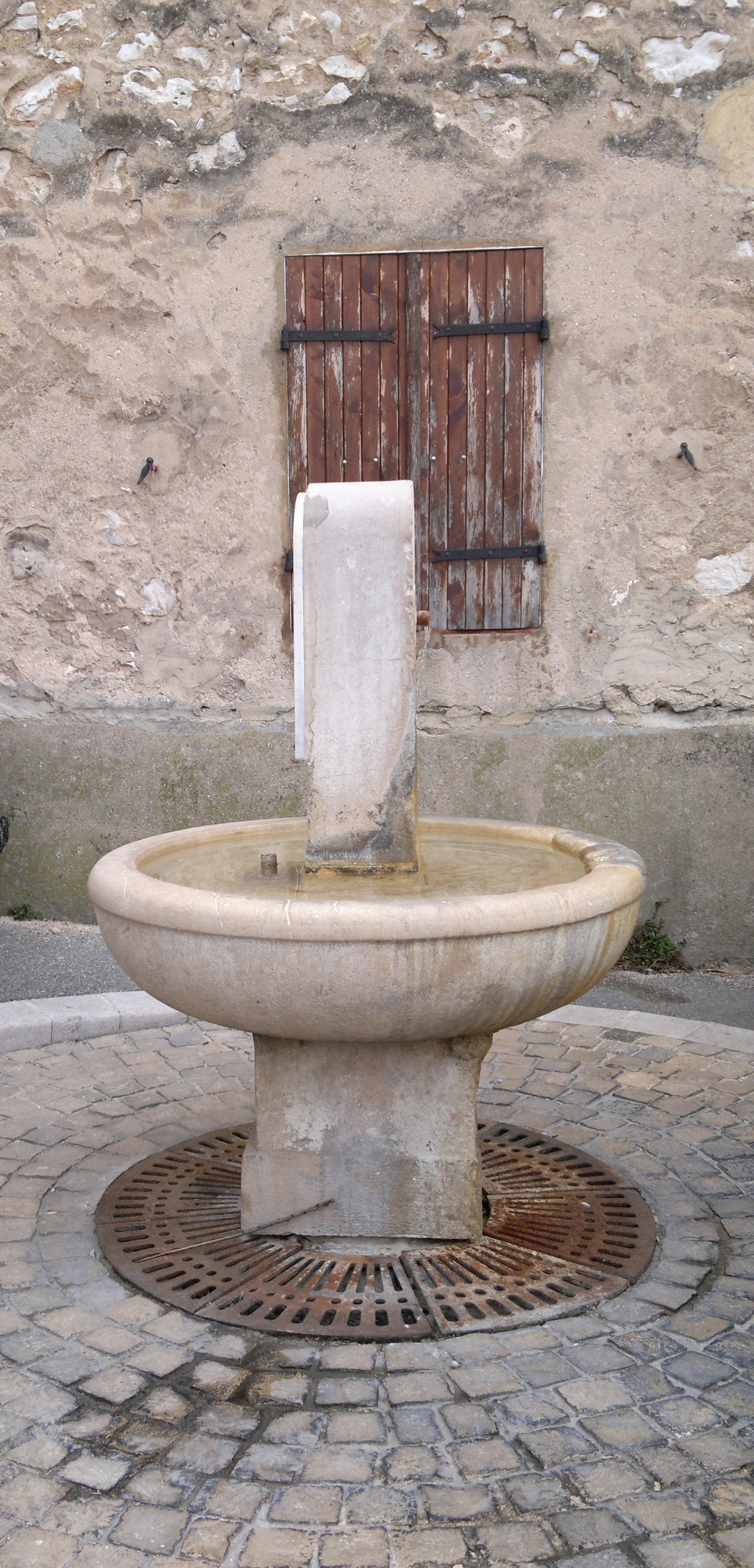
Fountain in the village square of La Treille

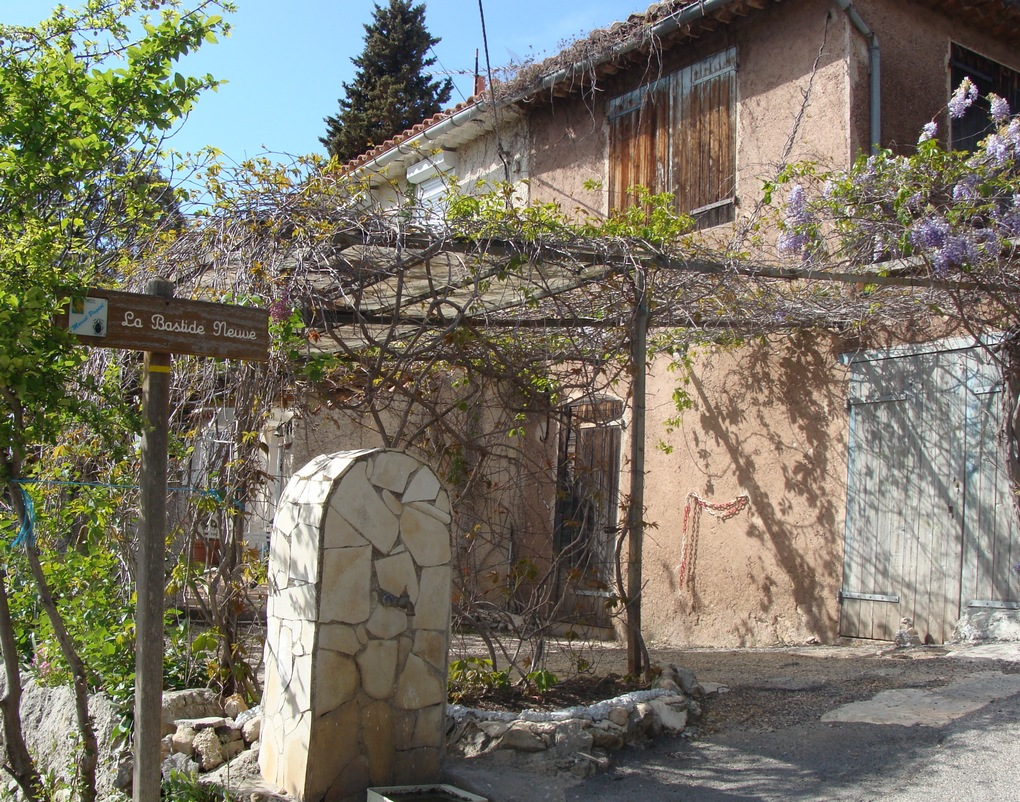
The Bastide Neuve at La Treille, Pagnol's boyhood holiday home

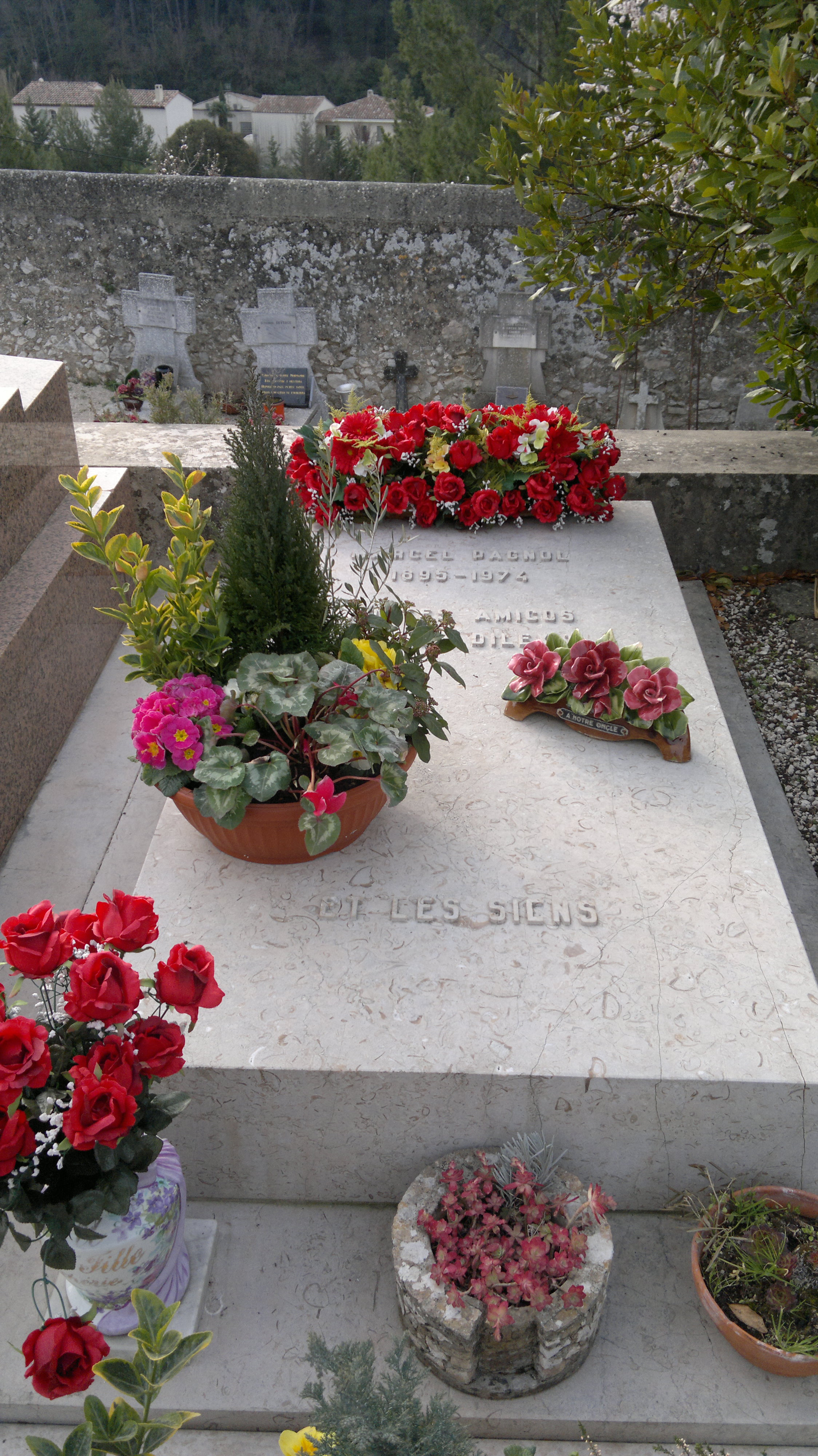
Grave of Pagnol, with Latin epitaph "Fontes amicos uxorem dilexit" (“He cherished springs, his friends, and his wife”, from Virgil)

== Notes and references ==
- Petri Liukkonen. "Marcel Pagnol". Books and Writers.
