= Jean-Pierre Darras =

French actor (1927–1999)

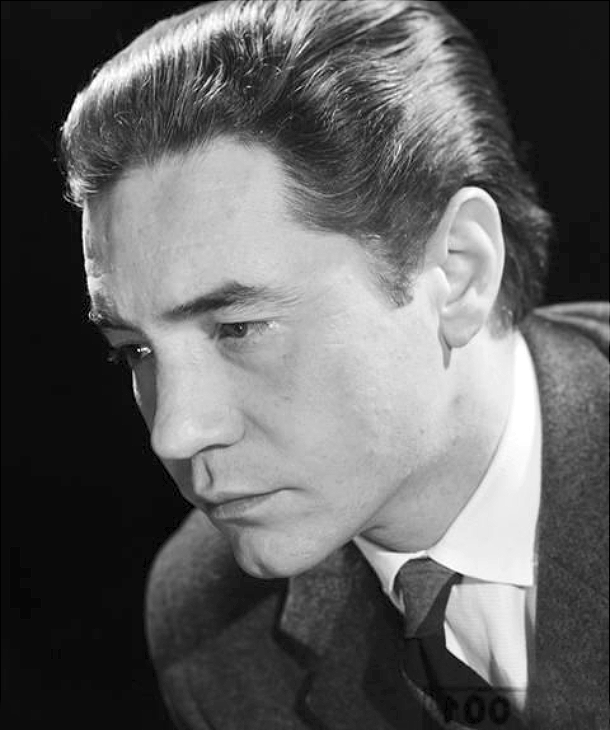
- Darras in 1965
- Born: 1927
- Died: 1999 (aged 71–72)
- Occupation: Actor

Jean-Pierre Darras (1927–1999) was a French actor, described by one film historian as "one of those very fine and versatile European stage actors who remain completely unknown in America." On the London stage he appeared in 1956 productions of Moliere's Don Juan and Victor Hugo's Marie Tudor.

== Filmography ==
Year	Title	Role	Notes
1959	Two Men in Manhattan	L'ivrogne au snack	Uncredited
1961	A Man Named Rocca	Névada	
1964	Monsieur	José	
1964	Lucky Jo	Napo	
1966	Un monde nouveau		
1966	The Second Twin	Le commissaire	
1966	Diamond Safari	Pascal Moratti	
1966	Four Queens for an Ace	Detective in Interrogation Room	
1967	Lagardère	Peyrolles	TV series
1968	Darling Caroline	Van Kript II	
1968	Le tatoué	Lucien	
1969	A Golden Widow	Rapha - le chef du syndicat du crime	
1970	Elle boit pas, elle fume pas, elle drague pas, mais... elle cause !	Georges, Monsieur le Comte	
1970	Elise, or Real Life	Le commissaire	
1970	Et qu'ça saute!	Jorge Blanco	
1970	L'alliance	M. Duvernet	
1971	La ville-bidon	M. Brunet	
1971	La coqueluche	Perotti	
1972	The Old Maid	Sacha	
1972	Le Viager	Emile Galipeau	
1973	Au rendez-vous de la mort joyeuse	Peron	
1973	Elle court, elle court la banlieue	Le chef du personnel (Paris)	
1973	L'emmerdeur	Fuchs	
1973	Molière pour Rire et pour Pleurer	Molière	TV miniseries
1974	Dis-moi que tu m'aimes	Lucien Dorgeval	
1975	Au-delà de la peur	Bourrier	
1976	Attention les yeux!	Co-Producer	
1976	Oublie-moi, Mandoline	Gérard Gouttières, dit G.G.	
1976	D'amour et d'eau fraîche	Clément	
1976	Mords pas, on t'aime!	Papy	
1976	The Porter from Maxim's	Le ministre	
1977	Parisian Life	Le baron	
1977	Genre masculin	Adolphe	
1977	Madame Ex		
1978	La Carapate	Jacques Panivaux	
1980	Three Men to Kill	Chocard	
1980-1986	Julien Fontanes, magistrat	Me Carré	2 episodes
1981	Les fourberies de Scapin	Argante	
1981	La puce et le privé	Le colonel Jean-Hilaire Marcellin	
1981	Le chêne d'Allouville	Le ministre de la culture	
1981	Signé Furax	Socrate	
1981	For a Cop's Hide	Commissioner Chauffard	
1982	Le bourgeois gentilhomme	Philosophy Master	
1982	Te marre pas... c'est pour rire!	Flavacourt	
1982	Jamais avant le mariage	Le préfet	
1983	Le Braconnier de Dieu	Frisou	Director / Wrtiter
1983	Adieu foulards	Achille Bernard	
1983	Le Voleur de feuilles	M. Marguerite	
1985	Asterix Versus Caesar	Abraracourcix	Voice
1986	L'enfant de colère		
1987	Le journal d'un fou	Le directeur	
1989	Babar: The Movie	Cornelius	French version, Voice
1990	My Father's Glory	Marcel / Narrator	Voice
1990	My Mother's Castle	Récitant / Narrator	Voice
