= Pierre Maguelon =

French actor

Pierre Maguelon (3 September 1933 – 10 July 2010) was a French actor, best known for his 9 year role as Inspector Marcel Terrasson in the television series "Les Brigades du Tigre" from 1973 to 1982.

Maguelon was born in Le Tarn on September 1933. He went on to become a well known french stage, television and film actor.

Maguelon died on the morning of 10 July 2010 in Perpignan of a cerebral hemorrhage. He had been "attending the Saint-André theater festival in the Pyrénées-Orientales region, where he was the guest of honour." Maguelon was 76.

In June 2025, a building was named in his honour, in the commune of Villeneuve-lès-Maguelone, from which he took his stage name.

== Selected filmography ==
- Tire-au-flanc 62 (1960)
- The President (1961) – Un parlementaire (uncredited)
- Cartouche (1962) – Un complice de Cartouche (uncredited)
- The Suitor (1962) – Olympia's Stage Manager
- Le roi du village (1963)
- Bebert das Arábias (1963) – Perrin – le chef de gare de Gretz
- Monnaie de singe (1966) – Un co-détenu
- Un garçon, une fille. Le dix-septième ciel (1966) – (uncredited)
- Mise à sac (1967) – Le pompier Arthur
- Very Happy Alexander (1968) – Verglandier
- Love in the Night (1968)
- Le tatoué (1968) – Le détective #2
- The Milky Way (1969) – Le caporal de la Guardia Civil / Civil Guard Corporal
- Élise ou la vraie vie (1970) – Le chef d'équipe
- Bed and Board (1970) – L'ami de Césarin
- Les Assassins de l'ordre (1971) – Le gardien
- The Discreet Charm of the Bourgeoisie (1972) – Police Sergeant
- Beau Masque (1972) – Mignot
- France société anonyme (1974)
- The Tiger Brigades (1974, TV series) – L'inspecteur Terrasson
- The Phantom of Liberty (1974) – Gérard, le gendarme / Policeman
- Vincent, François, Paul and the Others (1974) – Farina
- The Pink Telephone (1975) – Le patron de la brasserie
- Boomerang (1976) – L'inspecteur Léoni
- Le pays bleu (1977) – Clovis
- Et vive la liberté! (1978) – Le lieutenant
- Le pull-over rouge (1979) – L'inspecteur Commenci
- L'oeil du maître (1980) – Le patron du café
- A Bad Son (1980) – Le commissaire
- Garde à vue (1981) – Adami
- Cap Canaille (1983) – Varenne
- Julien Fontanes, magistrat (1985, TV Series) – André
- Le débutant (1986) – Gachassin
- Three Seats for the 26th (1988) – Marius Ceredo
- The Little Thief (1988) – Monsieur Fauvel
- Cyrano de Bergerac (1990) – Carbon de Castel-Jaloux
- Le provincial (1990) – Fernand Labadie
- My Father's Glory (1990) – François
- My Mother's Castle (1990) – François
- Triplex (1991) – Le gardien de prison optimiste
- Alice and Martin (1998) – Victor Sauvagnac
- Fin d'été (1999) – Roger
