= Clairette Oddera =

French actress and singer

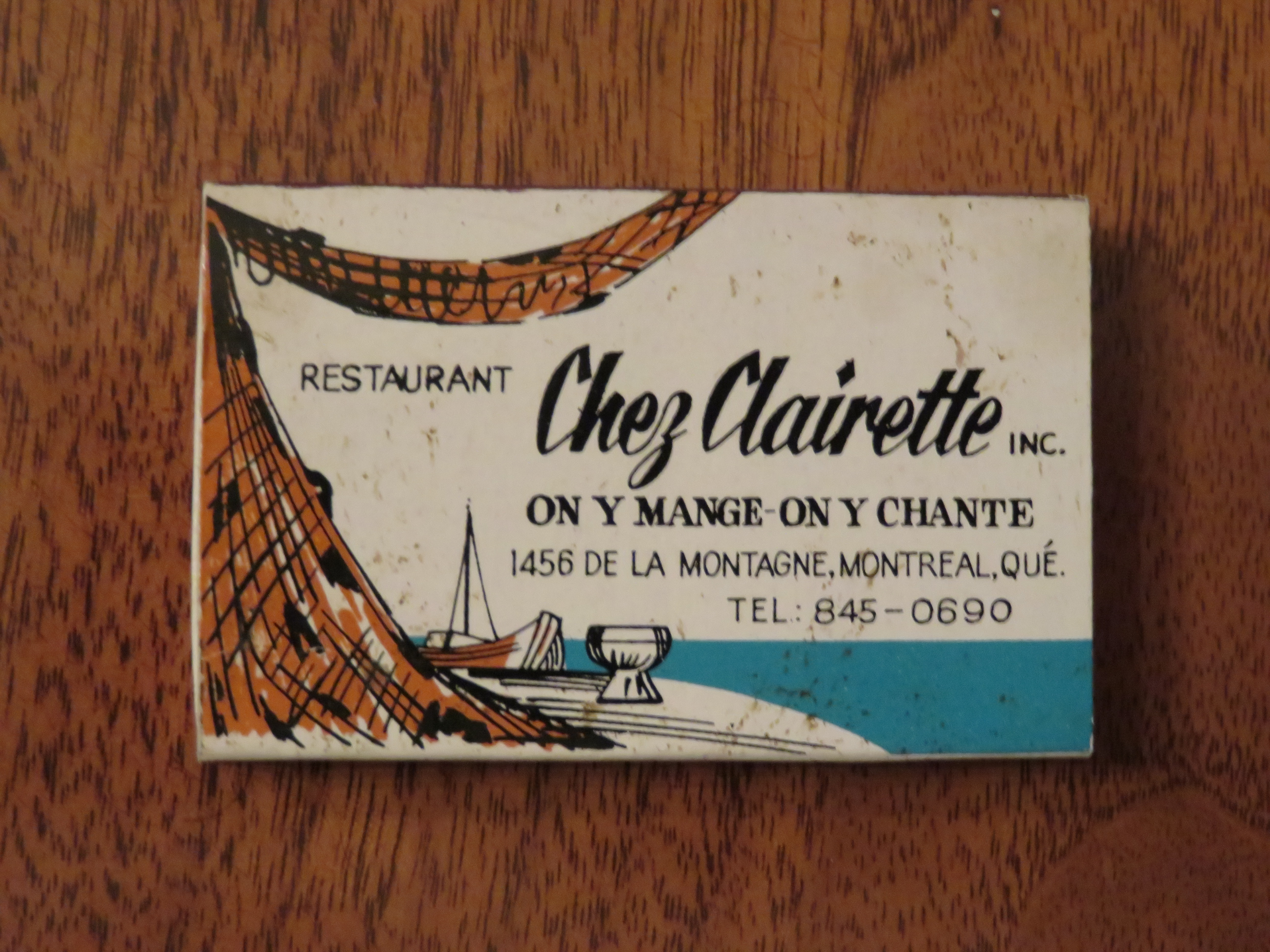
A matchbox made by Clairette's nightclub, "Chez Clairette"

Claire Françoise Oddera, CM CQ (April 3, 1919 – October 28, 2008), sometimes stated as simply Claire Oderra and better known as Clairette, was a Quebec-based French actress and singer. After her own career slowed down she became the proprietor of Montreal's "Chez Clairette" nightclub. In later life she received official honors for her cultural influence in giving a career break to many up-and-coming entertainers who later became famous.

Oddera was born in 1919 to Charles Oddera and Rose Fanucci in Marseille. At the age of 20 she became a waitress in the canteen of a local French film studio, owned by writer and filmmaker Marcel Pagnol, who provided her with her first film role in La fille du puisatier (1939). She adopted the stage name Clairette at the suggestion of Fernandel. She was later working in radio, where she was also known as a singer. During the Second World War, she made three other movies but mostly toured France on stage and in variety shows.

In 1949, she made her first visit to Quebec. She married at the age of 21 with the marriage lasting four years. In 1956, she emigrated to Quebec. She opened the eponymous "Chez Clairette" where, every Monday afternoon, she held auditions to scout out artists. Robert Charlebois, Claude Dubois, Diane Dufresne and France Castel, Christine Charbonneau were some of those artists whose careers she helped launch. It was also at "Chez Clairette" that lyricist Luc Plamondon met his future collaborator, pianist-composer André Gagnon. After the first "Chez Clairette" closed a second opened later in a different area of Montreal. It stayed in business for a decade.

She continued to perform while operating "Chez Clairette", appearing occasionally on the television series, Au pied de la pente douce. She opened an academy for singers at the home of her younger sister, singer Danielle Oddera. As the years progressed, Clairette continued to perform regularly. Her final public performance in June 2008 was at the Théâtre Denise-Pelletier on Sainte-Catherine Street.

She was made a Member of the Order of Canada in 2003 and a Knight of the National Order of Quebec in 2002.

She died in Montreal on October 28, 2008, aged 89. She had suffered from osteoarthritis and osteoporosis. She was entombed at the Notre Dame des Neiges Cemetery in Montreal.
