= Gunpowder (film) =

- Russian: Порох
- Directed by: Viktor Aristov
- Written by: Viktor Aristov; Artur Makarov
- Starring: Yury Belyayev; Svetlana Bragarnik; Lyubov Kalyuzhnaya; Vadim Makarovsky; Nozheri Chonishvili
- Cinematography: Yuri Vorontsov
- Music by: Arkadi Gagulashvili
- Release date: 1985
- Running time: 92 minute
- Country: Soviet Union
- Language: Russian

Gunpowder (Russian: Порох) is a 1985 Soviet war drama film directed by Viktor Aristov.

In the center of the plot is a detachment that managed to deliver gunpowder from Kronstadt to Leningrad, despite an attack by artillery and aircraft.

== Plot ==
In early September 1941, during the Great Patriotic War, German forces advance toward Leningrad. Nikolai Pavlovich Nikonov (played by Yuri Belyaev), a representative of the People’s Commissariat of State Control, is summoned to Smolny and tasked by A. A. Zhdanov, a member of the Leningrad Front’s Military Council, with a critical mission: to secure and transport modern artillery gunpowder from Kronstadt to Leningrad, essential for the Red Army's defense.

Nikonov leads a team, including military and scientific experts on gunpowder, to Kronstadt by boat, where they begin loading the powder onto barges amidst relentless Luftwaffe bombing. To divert the enemy, Nikonov proposes a decoy operation, and German aircraft focus on bombing a fake loading site, allowing the real barges to be filled without incident. That night, as the barges head toward Leningrad, Nikonov’s barge is attacked by German naval forces. The Red Banner Baltic Fleet’s ships fend off the assault, but during the bombings, Nikonov is concussed and falls overboard, only to be rescued by a soldier. The barge finally reaches Leningrad, where Nikonov is greeted as a hero and given two days to rest before his next assignment. This marks the twentieth day of the Siege of Leningrad.

== Cast ==
- Yury Belyayev as Nikolay Nikonov (as Yuriy Belyaev)
- Svetlana Bragarnik
- Lyubov Kalyuzhnaya
- Vadim Makarovsky
- Nozheri Chonishvili
- Vladimir Varentsov
- Konstantin Sarynin
- Dzheikhun Kerimov
- Nina Mazaeva
- Viktor Sukhorukov
