= 41st Berlin International Film Festival =

1991 film festival in Berlin, Germany

- Festival poster
- Opening film: Uranus
- Location: Berlin, Germany
- Founded: 1951
- Awards: Golden Bear: The House of Smiles
- No. of films: 402 films
- Festival date: 15–26 February 1991
- Website: Website

Berlin International Film Festival chronology
- 42nd 40th

The 41st annual Berlin International Film Festival was held from 15 to 26 February 1991. The festival opened with Uranus by Claude Berri.

The Golden Bear was awarded to Italian film The House of Smiles directed by Marco Ferreri.

The retrospective dedicated to Cold War films was shown at the festival.

== Jury ==
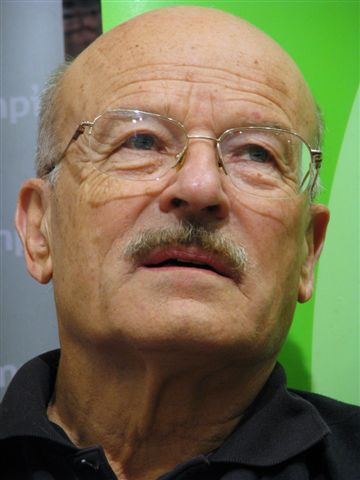
Volker Schlöndorff, Jury President

The following people were announced as being on the jury for the festival:

- Volker Schlöndorff, German filmmaker and producer - Jury President
- Chantal Akerman, Belgian filmmaker and actress
- Laurie Anderson, American musician and writer
- José Luis Borau, Spanish filmmaker
- Judith Godrèche, French actress and writer
- Yuri Klepikov, Soviet writer
- Renate Krößner, German actress
- Gillo Pontecorvo, Italian filmmaker
- Simon Relph, British producer
- Catharina Stackelberg, Swedish screenwriter
- Mircea Veroiu, Romanian filmmaker

== Official Sections ==
=== Main Competition ===
The following films were in competition for the Golden Bear and Silver Bear awards:

English title	Original title	Director(s)	Country
Amelia Lópes O'Neill		Valeria Sarmiento	Chile, Switzerland, France, Spain
The Ballad of the Sad Café		Simon Callow	United Kingdom, United States
Cabeza de Vaca		Nicolás Echevarría	Mexico, Spain, France, United States, United Kingdom
Captain Fracassa's Journey	Il viaggio di Capitan Fracassa	Ettore Scola	France, Italy
The Conviction	La condanna	Marco Bellocchio	Italy, Switzerland, France
Dances with Wolves		Kevin Costner	United States
Fortune Express		Olivier Schatzky	France
Good Evening, Mr. Wallenberg	God afton, Herr Wallenberg	Kjell Grede	Sweden
The House of Smiles	La casa del sorriso	Marco Ferreri	Italy
Li Lianying: The Imperial Eunuch	大太監李蓮英	Tian Zhuangzhuang	China, Hong Kong
The Little Gangster	Le Petit criminel	Jacques Doillon	France
Lovers	Amantes	Vicente Aranda	Spain
The Miracle		Neil Jordan	United Kingdom, Ireland
Mister Johnson		Bruce Beresford	United States
The Mountain	Der Berg	Markus Imhoof	Switzerland
Quiet Days in August	Ήσυχες μέρες του Αυγούστου	Pantelis Voulgaris	Greece
The Russia House		Fred Schepisi	United States
Satan	Сатана	Viktor Aristov	Soviet Union
The Silence of the Lambs		Jonathan Demme	United States
Snake Fang	دندان مار	Masoud Kimiai	Iran
Success	Erfolg	Franz Seitz Jr.	Germany
The Tango Player	Der Tangospieler	Roland Gräf	Germany
Ultrà		Ricky Tognazzi	Italy
Uranus		Claude Berri	France
When the Stars Were Red	Ked hviezdy boli cervené	Dušan Trančík	Czechoslovakia, France

=== Retrospective ===
1991 Retrospective poster, dedicated to Cold War films

The following films were shown in the retrospective:

English title	Original title	Director(s)	Country
The 27th Day		William Asher	United States
Advise And Consent	Advise and Consent	Otto Preminger	United States
Angel Face		Otto Preminger	United States
A Berlin Romance	Eine Berliner Romanze	Gerhard Klein	East Germany
The Big Lift		George Seaton	United States
The Big Steal		Don Siegel	United States
Blood on the Moon		Robert Wise	United States
Cape Fear		J. Lee Thompson	United States
The Condemned Village	Das verurteilte Dorf	Martin Hellberg	East Germany
Four in a Jeep	Die vier im Jeep	Leopold Lindtberg	Switzerland
The Deadly Affair		Sidney Lumet	United Kingdom
Diplomatic Courier		Henry Hathaway	United States
Divided Heaven	Der geteilte Himmel	Konrad Wolf	East Germany
Don Camillo in Moscow	Il compagno Don Camillo	Luigi Comencini	Italy, France
Double Dynamite		Irving Cummings	United States
Dr. Strangelove or How I Learned to Stop Worrying and Love the bomb		Stanley Kubrick	United Kingdom
Escape from East Berlin	Tunnel 28	Robert Siodmak	United States, West Germany
Fail-Safe		Sidney Lumet	United States
Farewell, My Lovely		Dick Richards	United States
For Eyes Only	For Eyes Only	János Veiczi	East Germany
Frauenschicksale		Slatan Dudow	East Germany
The Friends of Eddie Coyle		Peter Yates	United States
From Russia with Love		Terence Young	United Kingdom
Funeral In Berlin		Guy Hamilton	United Kingdom
Gentlemen Marry Brunettes		Richard Sale	United States
Gentlemen Prefer Blondes		Howard Hawks	United States
Heaven Knows, Mr. Allison		John Huston	United States
His Kind of Woman		John Farrow	United States
Home from the Hill		Vincente Minnelli	United States
Hot Blood		Nicholas Ray	United States
I Married a Communist		Robert Stevenson	United States
Invasion of the Body Snatchers		Don Siegel	United States
Invasion U.S.A.		Alfred E. Green	United States
The Iron Curtain		William A. Wellman	United States
I Was a Communist for the FBI		Gordon Douglas	United States
Jet Pilot		Josef von Sternberg	United States
The Kremlin Letter		John Huston	United States
The Looking Glass War		Frank Pierson	United Kingdom
The Lusty Men		Nicholas Ray	United States
Macao		Josef von Sternberg	United States
The Man Between		Carol Reed	United Kingdom
The Manchurian Candidate		John Frankenheimer	United States
Man on a Tightrope		Elia Kazan	United States
Montana Belle		Allan Dwan	United States
The Night of the Hunter		Charles Laughton	United States
One, Two, Three		Billy Wilder	United States
Out of the Past		Jacques Tourneur	United States
The Outlaw		Howard Hughes	United Kingdom
The Paleface		Norman Z. McLeod	United States
Pursued		Raoul Walsh	United States
Quatermass 2		Val Guest	United Kingdom
The Red Danube		George Sidney	United States
Red Dawn		John Milius	United States
The Red Menace		R. G. Springsteen	United States
Red Nightmare		George Waggner	United States
Red Planet Mars		Harry Horner	United States
The Revolt Of Mamie Stover		Raoul Walsh	United States
River of No Return		Otto Preminger	United States
Ryan's Daughter		David Lean	United Kingdom
Seven Days in May		John Frankenheimer	United States
Son of Paleface		Frank Tashlin	United States
The Spies	Les Espions	Henri-Georges Clouzot	France, Italy
The Spy Who Came in from the Cold		Martin Ritt	United Kingdom
Stop Train 349	Verspätung in Marienborn	Rolf Hädrich	West Germany
Story of a Young Couple	Roman einer jungen Ehe	Kurt Maetzig	East Germany
The Tall Men		Raoul Walsh	United States
Thunder Road		Arthur Ripley	United States
Topaz		Alfred Hitchcock	United Kingdom
Torn Curtain		Alfred Hitchcock	United States
Track of the Cat		William A. Wellman	United States
Walk East on Beacon		Alfred L. Werker	United States
Where Danger Lives		John Farrow	United States
The Wonderful Country		Robert Parrish	United States
The Yakuza		Sydney Pollack	United States
The Young Lovers		Anthony Asquith	United Kingdom

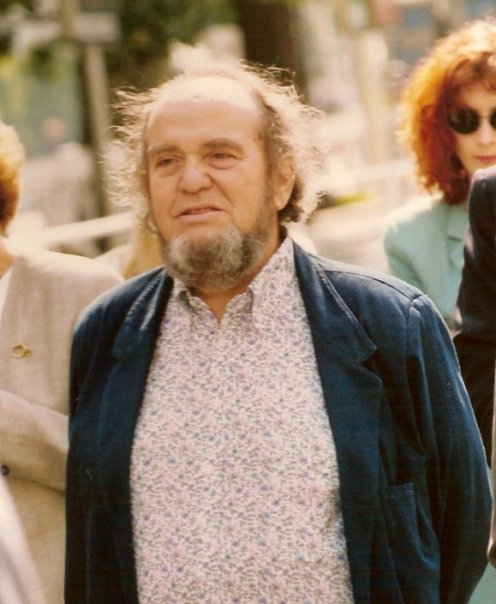
Marco Ferreri, winner of the Golden Bear at the festival

== Official Awards ==
The following prizes were awarded by the Jury:

- Golden Bear: The House of Smiles by Marco Ferreri
- Silver Bear – Special Jury Prize:
  - The Conviction by Marco Bellocchio
  - Satan by Viktor Aristov
- Silver Bear for Best Director:
  - Jonathan Demme for The Silence of the Lambs
  - Ricky Tognazzi for Ultrà
- Silver Bear for Best Actress: Victoria Abril for Amantes
- Silver Bear for Best Actor: Maynard Eziashi for Mister Johnson
- Silver Bear for an outstanding single achievement: Kevin Costner for Dances with Wolves
- Honourable Mention:
  - Snake Fang
  - The Little Gangster by Jacques Doillon
  - Li Lianying: The Imperial Eunuch

== Independent Awards ==
=== FIPRESCI Award ===
- The Little Gangster by Jacques Doillon
