= Souvenirs d'enfance =

- Author: Marcel Pagnol
- Illustrator: Dubout / Dany Lartigue
- Country: France
- Language: French
- Genre: Autobiographical novels
- Publisher: Éditions Pastorelly
- Published: 1957-1959 & 1977

Souvenirs d'enfance (French pronunciation: [suvəniʁ dɑ̃fɑ̃s]; "Souvenirs of infancy", "Childhood memories") is a series of autobiographical novels by French filmmaker and académicien, Marcel Pagnol (1895–1974). Souvenirs d'enfance comprises four volumes covering the years from his birth in 1895 to about 1910, which were spent in Marseille, with family summer holidays in La Treille, about ten kilometres (six miles) away. The four volumes in order are La Gloire de mon père ("My Father's Glory"); Le Château de ma mère ("My Mother's Castle"); Le Temps des secrets ("The Time of Secrets"); and Le Temps des amours ("The Time of Love"). The first two were published in 1957, the third in 1960, and the fourth, which was unfinished, was published posthumously in 1977. The first two were made into films, directed by Yves Robert.

== Notes and references ==
- Petri Liukkonen. "Marcel Pagnol". Books and Writers.

== Filmography ==
- My Father's Glory (1990)
- My Mother's Castle (1990)
