= Satan (1991 film) =

1991 film

- Directed by: Viktor Aristov
- Written by: Viktor Aristov
- Produced by: Sergei Avrutin
- Starring: Maria Averbach
- Cinematography: Yuri Vorontsov
- Edited by: Irina Vigdortchik
- Release date: February 1991
- Running time: 106 minutes
- Country: Soviet Union
- Language: Russian

Satan (Russian: Сатана) is a 1991 Soviet thriller film directed by Viktor Aristov. It was entered into the 41st Berlin International Film Festival where it won the Silver Bear - Special Jury Prize.

Initially the film was planned to be based on the novel Nonhuman (Нелюдь) by Arkadi Vayner, but the director failed to reach an agreement with Vayners, and he wrote a new screenplay loosely based on the central idea of Vayners' novel, an abduction of the daughter of a VIP woman. Vayner sued, unsuccessfully.

== Plot ==
The story takes place in a provincial town in autumn. Schoolgirl Olya, daughter of a prominent official, Alyona Pavlovna, accepts a ride to school from her acquaintance Vitaly. Along the way, he kills her near a railway yard. Vitaly then hides his bike and clothes at a country house where his grandfather, who was aware of his intentions, waits for him. Later, Vitaly goes into town, briefly visiting his friend Ruben, who is with a girlfriend, before confessing his feelings to Vera, who rejects him. At a wedding later that evening, Vitaly clashes with Ruben over a nationalist remark, and then, while dancing with the bride, assaults her, knowing she won’t report it. Meanwhile, Vitaly and his grandfather contact Olya’s parents, demanding a ransom for her return. It is revealed that Vitaly had been romantically involved with Alyona Pavlovna, but she ended it due to his reputation.

Olya’s father, Korshunov, a local theater actor, goes to the police after realizing they cannot raise the ransom. While Alyona Pavlovna meets her influential contacts to seek help, Korshunov manages to deliver the ransom with police surveillance. That night, Vitaly and his grandfather celebrate their scheme at the country house, but Vitaly insists his grandfather leave town. Returning home, he finds Alyona Pavlovna waiting for him, desperate after realizing the ransom failed. A slip in their conversation reveals Vitaly’s involvement in Olya’s abduction. He coldly confesses to the murder and leaves. In the film’s final shot, Vitaly waves to the viewer from a departing tram, leaving Alyona devastated.

== Cast ==
- Maria Averbach
- Svetlana Bragarnik
- Sergei Kupriyanov
