= Église Saint-Charles =

Roman Catholic church in Marseille, France

Coordinates: 43.2920°N 5.3754°E

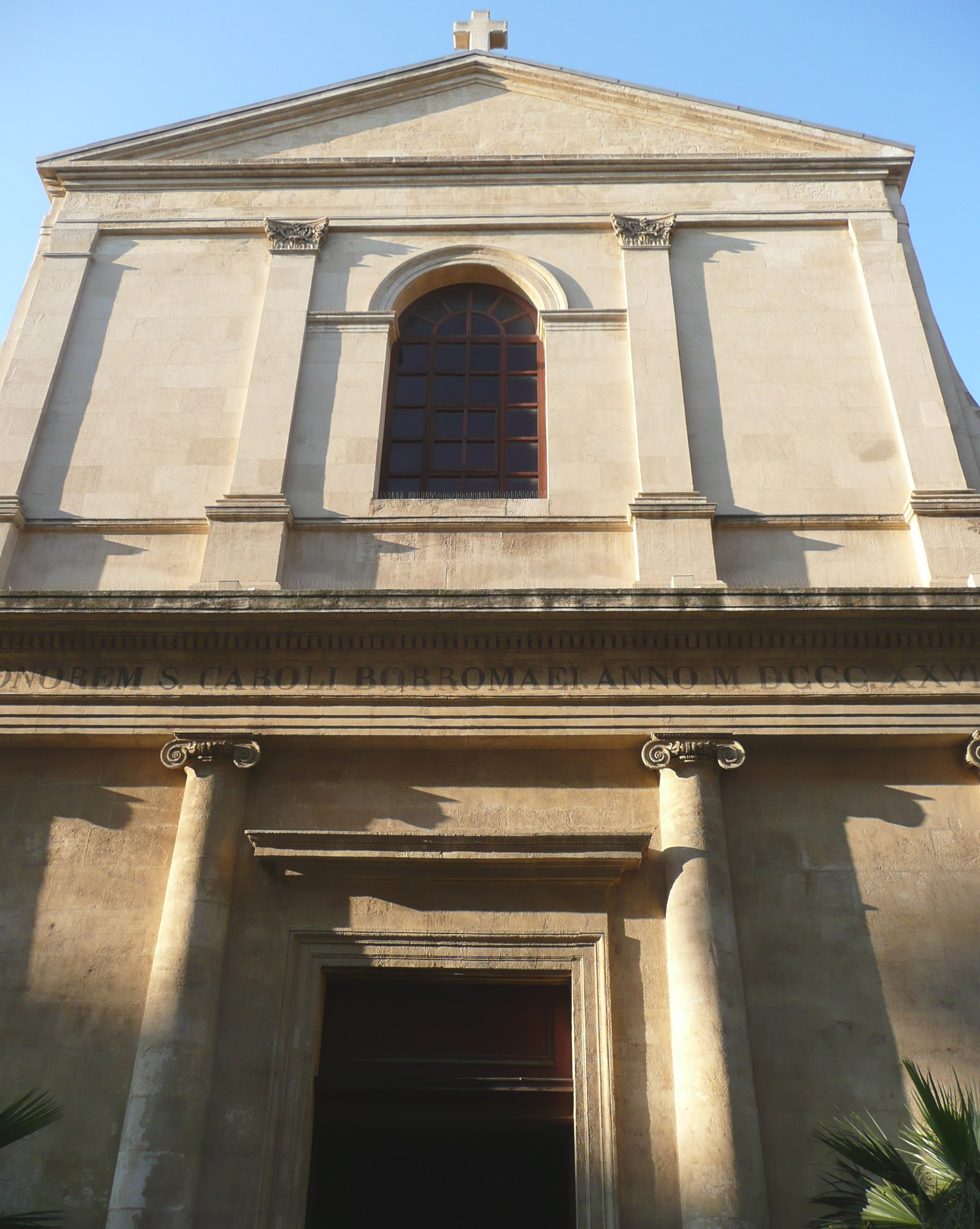

Église Saint-Charles is a Roman Catholic church in Marseille, France. It is served by the Société des missionnaires de la miséricorde divine.

It was the church where Marcel Pagnol was secretly baptised.
