= Ali Rafie =

- علی رفیعی
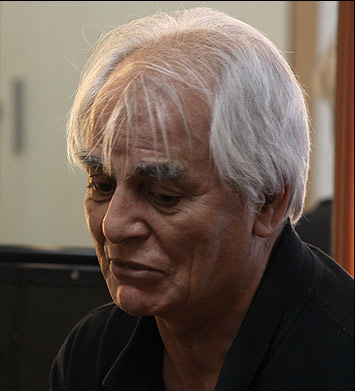
- Rafie in 2013
- Born: January 11, 1938 (age 87); Isfahan, Iran
- Occupation(s): Director, Playwright, Stage designer
- Years active: 1958–present

Ali Rafie (Persian: علی رفیعی; born January 11, 1938) is an Iranian theatre and cinema director and stage designer.

== Education ==
He received a B.S and master's in sociology (1964–1968), as well as a B.S., master's, and Ph.D. in theater (1967–1974), from the Sorbonne in Paris.

== Plays (as a writer, director and stage designer) ==
- Antigone by Sophocles, Molavi theatre, 1974
- Shivan va Esteghase Paye Divare Boland Shahr by Tankred Dorst, Shahr Theatre, 1976
- Khaterat va Kabous haye Yek Jamedan az Ghatle Amir Kabir by Ali Rafie, Shahr Theatre, 1976
- Crime and Punishment by Fyodor Dostoyevsky, Shahr Theatre, 1976
- Memory Of Sand Years (Yadegare Salhaye Shen) by Ali Rafie, Vahdat Hall, 1992
- Yek Rooze Khatere Angiz baraye Daneshmand Voo by a Chinese writer, Vahdat Hall, 1997
- Blood Wedding by Federico García Lorca, Vahdat Hall, 1998
- Romeo and Juliet by William Shakespeare, Vahdat Hall, 2000
- Shazde Ehtejab by Hooshang Golshiri, Vahdat Hall, 2001
- The Maids by Jean Genet, Shahr Theatre, 2002
- Never snows in Egypt by Mohamad Charmshir, Shahr Theatre, 2003
- Fox Hunting (شکار روباه) by Ali Rafie, Vahdat Hall, 2009
- Kitchen, (preparing), 2012

== Stage Designing ==
- The Caucasian Chalk Circle by Bertolt Brecht directed by Hamid samandariyan, 1998
- Dokhtare Gol foroush directed by Parvane Mojde, 1999
- The Postman (Pablo Neroda) by Antonio Skarmeta directed by Alireza Kooshk Jalali, 1999

== Tele Theater (as a director) ==
- L'Avare by Molière, channel2 IRIB, 1993

== Filmography ==
- Agha Yousef (writer and director), 2011
- The Fish Fall in Love (writer and director), 2005
- Plaisir d'amour en Iran directed by Agnès Varda (actor), 1976
- One Sings, the Other Doesn't directed by Agnès Varda (actor), 1977
