= Viktor Aristov (director) =

Soviet film director

- Born: 9 June 1943; Budyonnovka, Soviet Union
- Died: 2 January 1994 (aged 50); Russia
- Occupations: Film director Screenwriter
- Years active: 1980 – 1994

Viktor Fyodorovich Aristov (Russian: Виктор Фёдорович Аристов; 9 June 1943 – 2 January 1994) was a Soviet film director and screenwriter. He directed five films between 1980 and 1994. His 1991 film Satan was entered into the 41st Berlin International Film Festival where it won the Silver Bear - Special Jury Prize.

== Selected filmography ==
=== Actor ===
- Sherlock Holmes and Dr. Watson (1979)
- Among Grey Stones (1983)
- The Asthenic Syndrome (1990)

=== Director ===
- A Twig in the Wind (1980)
- Gunpowder (1985)
- The In-Laws (1987)
- The First 100 Years are Hard (1988)
- Satan (1991)
- Rain in the Ocean (1994) - finished by Yuri Mamin

=== Screenwriter ===
- The Wife has left (1979)
- Gunpowder (1985)
- Satan (1991)
- Rain in the Ocean (1994)
