= One Sings, the Other Doesn't =

- Theatrical release poster
- Directed by: Agnès Varda
- Screenplay by: Agnès Varda
- Produced by: Ciné Tamaris
- Starring: Thérèse Liotard; Valérie Mairesse; Ali Rafie; Robert Dadiès
- Cinematography: Charlie Van Damme
- Edited by: Joële van Effenterre
- Music by: François Werthmeimer; Orchidée
- Production company: Ciné-Tamaris
- Distributed by: Gaumont Distribution
- Release date: 9 March 1977 (France)
- Running time: 116 minutes
- Country: France
- Language: French

One Sings, the Other Doesn't (French: L'une chante, l'autre pas) is a 1977 French film written and directed by Agnès Varda that focuses on the lives of two women over 14 years against the backdrop of the women's movement in 1970s France.

== Plot ==
In 1962 Paris, Pauline, a 17-year-old schoolgirl studying for her baccalaureate, wanders into a gallery because she recognizes her old friend Suzanne in one of the photographs displayed. Pauline learns the photographer, Jerôme, is Suzanne's partner, though they are not married. Pauline reconnects with the 22-year-old Suzanne, who has two children with Jerôme and is expecting a third. When Suzanne tells Pauline she cannot afford to have a third child, Pauline helps secure the money for an illegal abortion for Suzanne. To get the money, Pauline lies to her parents about a school trip; when they find out what the money was used for, she leaves home, drops out of school, and begins working as a singer. Jerôme commits suicide and Suzanne moves back to her parents' farm, where she is looked down on for having illegitimate children.

Ten years pass before the two women are reunited at a 1972 demonstration in Bobigny for abortion rights. Pauline, now known as "Pomme" ("Apple"), sings in a feminist folk group and lives with her partner Darius, a grad student she met in Amsterdam when she was herself getting an abortion. Suzanne has managed to leave her parents' farm by teaching herself typing, and has opened a family planning clinic in Hyères. Although the two women have to part ways once more, they keep in touch by sending each other postcards. Pauline later moves to Darius's native Iran, where they marry and Pauline becomes pregnant. When their relationship becomes strained, Pomme leaves Darius and returns to France, where she has the baby at Suzanne's clinic. She lets Darius return to Iran with their infant son on the condition that he impregnate her again. A pregnant Pomme is able to go back on the road as a singer. Suzanne, after an unfulfilling relationship with a sailor, marries a local doctor. In a brief epilogue, Pomme and Suzanne, their families, and their friends have a reunion by the sea.

== Cast ==
- Valérie Mairesse as Pomme (Pauline)
- Thérèse Liotard as Suzanne
- Robert Dadiès as Jérôme
- Ali Rafie as Darius
- Jean-Pierre Pellegrin as Docteur Pierre Aubanel

Pomme's singing group, Orchidee, is portrayed by Joëlle Papineau, Micou Papineau and Doudou Greffier.

== Production ==
Production for the film took place in 1976. As Pomme and Suzanne exchange letters and postcards, their words are read by the actresses in voice-over. Varda also narrates, mediating the two women's stories. The protest where Pomme and Suzanne reconnect was a recreation of a real demonstration in France at the trial of a woman who had had an abortion after being raped. For the demonstration scene, Varda had

nonactors playing demonstrators and the legendary human-rights lawyer Gisèle Halimi (who was the [case’s] defense attorney) at one point breaking through a police line to take some demonstrators into the courthouse. In the crowd, women carry banners in support of 'the 343', the prominent women—including Varda—who had signed a manifesto testifying that they had had illegal abortions, which was printed in 1971 in the influential left-of-center weekly Le nouvel observateur.

Though not considered a musical, One Sings, the Other Doesn't contains a few theatrical set pieces and musical numbers, which Varda wrote the lyrics for. In the film's last scene, Suzanne's teenage daughter is played by Varda's daughter, Rosalie Varda-Demy, and in earlier scenes, the boy Zorro is played by Varda's son, Mathieu Demy.

== Critical reception ==
The film was met with mixed reviews upon its release. Based on 48 reviews, the film holds a rating of 65% on review aggregator site Rotten Tomatoes The site's consensus is: "Spanning over a decade, One Sings, The Other Doesn't is a thoughtfully radical tale of two friends that captures female solidarity with an honest beat set to the fight for women's rights."

Roger Ebert awarded the film four out of four stars, praising its simplicity, its portrayal of the leading female characters' friendship and Varda's direction:

Varda's title is a perfect one (and even more melodic in French: 'L'une chante, l'autre pas'). Here we have them, she says: Two women, friends, and one sings and the other doesn't, but they'll remain friends and sisters for all of their lives. The movie's final passages are among the best. Pomme comes with her child and friends to spend some time on the farm, and so several generations are brought together as the two friends approach the middles of their lives. There's a picnic, and kids playing, and wine, and singing (but of too many songs), and what Varda's doing, in a sneaky way, is making her case for feminism in a lyric voice instead of a preachy one.

Justin Chang of the Los Angeles Times wrote, "To describe Varda’s picture as an ardent tribute to the never-not-timely subjects of women’s liberation and solidarity is to risk making it sound awfully schematic. But if One Sings, the Other Doesn't is something of a thesis movie, that thesis takes shape gently, with equal parts documentary grit and dreamlike evanescence."
