= Nathalie Roussel =

French actress

Nathalie Roussel (born 14 September 1956) is a French actress of stage, television and film. She is best known for her role in the 1991 films My Father's Glory and My Mother's Castle.

== Filmography ==
- Les violons du bal (1974) .... La soeur de Michel/Michel's Sister
- Le Cri du coeur (1974) .... Babette
- Section spéciale (1975)
- Speak to Me of Love (1975) .... Anne
- Banlieue Sud-Est (1977) (mini) TV Series .... Zézette
- Mazarin (1978) (mini) TV Series .... Marie Mancini
- Les Givrés (1979) .... Nathalie
- Le Jeune homme vert (1979) (mini) TV Series .... Chantal
- La Pharisienne (1980) (TV) .... Michèle Pian
- Guy de Maupassant (1982)
- Julien Fontanes, magistrat (1983) .... Rose
- My Father's Glory (1990) .... Augustine
- L'Or et le papier (1990) TV Series .... Jeanne Bouvier
- My Mother's Castle (1990) .... Augustine
- A Mere Mortal (Simple mortel) (1991) .... Brigitte
- Mayrig (1992) .... Gayane
- Les Yeux d'Hélène (1994) TV Series
- L'Affaire Seznec (1993) (TV) .... Marie-Jeanne Seznec
- Antoine Rives, juge du terrorisme (1993) TV Series .... Commissaire Claire Devaux
- 588 rue paradis (1993) .... Gayane
- 3000 scénarios contre un virus (1994) .... (segment L'Exclusion)
- Ange Espérandieu (1995) (TV) .... Dolores
- Un homme est tombé dans la rue (1996)
- Il barone (1996) (mini) TV Series .... Annalisa
- Mon père avait raison (1996) (TV) .... Loulou
- Le Grand Batre (1997) (TV) .... Zanie
- Dossier: disparus (1998) TV Series .... Florence Sobel
- T'aime (2000) .... Jeanne Michel
- Route de nuit (2000) (TV) .... Mathilde
- Les Rois mages (2001) .... La mère de Macha
- Commissariat Bastille (2001) TV Series .... Marie (2001–2003)
- Joséphine, ange gardien (2002) TV Series .... Anne (1 Episode)
- Moments de vérité (2004) (TV) .... Marie
- Inside (2007) .... Louise Scarangelo

== Personal life ==
Roussel was married to David Toscan du Plantier, the son of the French film producer Daniel Toscan du Plantier and the French actress Marie-Christine Barrault. Their daughter Marie was born in 1995. Nathalie Roussel won the Mademoiselle Âge Tendre magazine contest in 1972.
