= My Father's Glory (film) =

- French poster for the film
- Directed by: Yves Robert
- Written by: Yves Robert; Louis Nucéra; Jérôme Tonnerre
- Based on: My Father's Glory by Marcel Pagnol
- Produced by: Alain Poiré
- Starring: Philippe Caubère; Nathalie Roussel; Thérèse Liotard; Julien Ciamaca
- Narrated by: Jean-Pierre Darras
- Cinematography: Christophe Beaucarne; Robert Alazraki; Eric Vallée; Paco Wiser
- Edited by: Pierre Gillette
- Music by: Vladimir Cosma
- Distributed by: Gaumont Distribution
- Release date: 29 August 1990
- Running time: 110 minutes
- Country: France
- Language: French
- Box office: $53.5 million

My Father's Glory (original title: French: La Gloire de mon père) is a 1990 French film directed by Yves Robert, based on the autobiographical novel My Father's Glory by Marcel Pagnol. The sequel, which was also filmed by Robert in 1990, is My Mother's Castle (Le Château de ma mère). Both films are based on the cycle Souvenirs d'enfance, started in 1957.

== Plot ==
This film is set between 1900 and the First World War. Young Marcel was born in the country but raised in Marseilles. His father, Joseph, is a hard-working, atheistic school teacher in Marseilles. Marcel's maternal aunt Rose marries the rotund, jovial, and pious Roman Catholic Uncle Jules. The two men argue over religion.

Over the summer, both men take their respective families to share a house in Provence in southern France. Here, Jules offers to educate Joseph on hunting. Marcel wants to come with them, but they lie to him and leave the house early in the morning while they think he is asleep. Waking, he follows them stealthily and is angered by Jules humiliating Joseph by demonstrating the difference in their hunting prowess. Marcel then becomes lost but he meets a boy called Lili, who tells him where the hunting party is. Joseph takes potshots at two rock partridges and they fall to ground beside Marcel. He watches as Jules reprimands Joseph for missing the birds. At this point, Marcel reveals himself and the partridges.

Later, Lili, who knows the countryside well, becomes Marcel's friend and teaches him about it. They regularly go exploring in the hills. As the holiday comes to an end, Marcel plans with Lili to hide himself in a cave and live as a hermit. On the day of his family's departure, Marcel gets up early in the morning. He has written a letter earlier, explaining his disappearance to his parents, and excusing his behaviour. He warns them that they will not be able to find him in his "new home," and should not bother searching.

He then walks to the cave with Lili, who has been waiting for him near his house. As they arrive, Marcel begins to become afraid of living alone. He invents excuses to avoid living in the cave. He then runs home quickly to prevent his parents reading the letter, which he had placed on his pillow. As he returns home, everyone is already busy loading up a carriage for the journey home. He runs up to his room and, discovering that the letter is still on his pillow, assumes that no one has read it. As he gets ready to leave the house for a last time, his parents make a remark which indicates that they in fact did read the letter. The film ends with Marcel and his family departing in a coach, and Lili looking on.

== Cast and roles ==
- Philippe Caubère as Joseph Pagnol
- Nathalie Roussel as Augustine Pagnol
- Didier Pain as Uncle Jules
- Thérèse Liotard as Aunt Rose
- Julien Ciamaca as the 11-year-old Marcel Pagnol
  - Benoît Martin as little Marcel
- Victorien Delamare as Paul Pagnol
- Joris Molinas as Lili de Bellons
- Paul Crauchet as Edmond des Parpaillouns AKA Mond des Parpaillouns
- Pierre Maguelon as François
- Michel Modo as the postman
- Jean Rougerie as Bergougnas, the antique dealer
- Jean-Pierre Darras as the narrator (voice of Marcel)
- Victor Garrivier as la Treille's bishop
- Raoul Curet as Mr Vincent
- Maxime Lombard as Mr Arnaud
- Michèle Loubet as Miss Guimard, the schoolmistress
- René Loyon as Mr Besson
- Anik Danis as the maid
- Andrée Damant as woman

== Reception ==
The film opened at number one in Paris grossing 4.8 million Franc ($930,000) from 163,270 admissions.

== See also ==
- Souvenirs d'enfance
- My Father's Glory, the original novel
- My Mother's Castle, the sequel
