= The Well-Digger's Daughter (2011 film) =

- French poster
- Directed by: Daniel Auteuil
- Screenplay by: Daniel Auteuil
- Based on: The Well-Digger's Daughter by Marcel Pagnol
- Produced by: Alain Sarde
- Starring: Daniel Auteuil; Àstrid Bergès-Frisbey; Kad Merad; Sabine Azéma
- Cinematography: Jean-François Robin
- Edited by: Joëlle Hache
- Music by: Alexandre Desplat
- Distributed by: Pathé
- Release date: 20 April 2011
- Running time: 107 minutes
- Country: France
- Language: French
- Budget: €12.5 million
- Box office: $12.6 million

The Well-Digger's Daughter (French: La Fille du puisatier) is a 2011 French romantic drama film. Daniel Auteuil makes his directorial debut as he stars alongside Àstrid Bergès-Frisbey, Kad Merad, Sabine Azéma, Jean-Pierre Darroussin, and Nicolas Duvauchelle.

The screenplay by Auteuil is based on the 1940 film The Well-Digger's Daughter written and directed by Marcel Pagnol.

== Plot ==
Jacques Mazel, a 26 year-old pilot in the French Air Force and the only child of a wealthy shopkeeper, is fishing in a stream near his parents' home. On the bank appears 18 year-old Patricia Amoretti, eldest daughter of a widowed well-digger, who is taking lunch to her father, Pascal, and his employee, Félipe. Jacques carries her across the stream and, after seeing her again at an air display the next day, takes her for a ride on his motorbike. On their way home, they stop in a field to make love. Later that night, Jacques is called for an air campaign in Africa, so, unable to keep a rendezvous with Patricia in the morning, he asks his mother to deliver a letter. She, not approving his choice of company, burns the letter.

Patricia, who concludes that Jacques has rejected her because they are from different social classes, discovers that she is pregnant. Confronted by Pascal, the parents of Jacques reject the idea that their son conceived a child out of wedlock and refuse to acknowledge the expected baby. To spare his five other daughters from the social opprobrium of an illegitimate child in the family, Pascal sends Patricia to have her baby with his sister in another village.

News arrives that Jacques is missing, his plane having gone down in flames behind German lines. Félipe offers to marry Patricia, but she declines, partly because her younger sister Amanda has a crush on Felipe. Grieving over the loss of their son, the Mazels offer to take some responsibility for their newborn grandson, but Pascal obstinately rejects their offer.

It is later revealed that Jacques managed to survive the plane crash by parachuting into neutral Switzerland, and learns that he has a son. His overjoyed parents call on Pascal to ask if he will forgive them and allow a marriage. He agrees if the couple agree. As their love is as strong as when they first met, the film ends happily.

== Cast ==
- Daniel Auteuil as Pascal Amoretti, the well-digger
- Àstrid Bergès-Frisbey as Patricia Amoretti, his eldest daughter
- Kad Merad as Félipe Rambert, his employee
- Jean-Pierre Darroussin as Monsieur Mazel, the shopkeeper
- Sabine Azéma as Madame Mazel, his wife
- Nicolas Duvauchelle as Jacques Mazel, their son
- Marie-Anne Chazel as Nathalie, Pascal's sister
- Émilie Cazenave as Amanda Amoretti, Pascal's second daughter

== Production ==
The original music score was composed by Alexandre Desplat and features Enrico Caruso's rendition of "Core 'ngrato".

== Critical response ==
On the review aggregator website Rotten Tomatoes, the film has an approval rating of 90%, based on 39 reviews, with an average rating of 7.4/10. On Metacritic, the film has a weighted average score of 67 out of 100, based on 17 critics, indicating "generally favorable reviews".
