= Marcel Pagnol =

Novelist, playwright and filmmaker from France

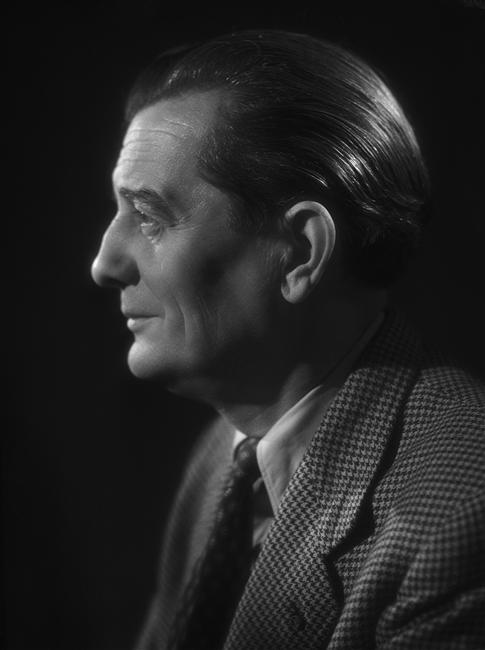
- Pagnol in 1948
- Born: Marcel Paul Pagnol; 28 February 1895; Aubagne, Third French Republic
- Died: 18 April 1974 (aged 79); Paris, France
- Occupations: Author; Playwright; Film director
- Spouse(s): Simone Collin (m. 1916; div. 1941) Jacqueline Bouvier (m. 1945)
- Partner(s): Orane Demazis (1925–1937); Josette Day (1939–1944)
- Children: 5
- Writing career
- Notable works: Marius; Manon des sources The Water of the Hills; My Father's Glory; Le Château de ma mère
- Website: marcel-pagnol.com

Marcel Paul Pagnol (/pəˈnjɒl, pæ-/, also US: /pɑːˈnjɔːl/ pah-NYAWL; French: [maʁsɛl pɔl paɲɔl]; 28 February 1895 – 18 April 1974) was a French novelist, playwright, and filmmaker. Regarded as an auteur, in 1946, he became the first filmmaker elected to the Académie française. Pagnol is generally regarded as one of France's greatest 20th-century writers and is notable for his mastery of multiple literary genres—memoir, novel, theatre and film.

== Early life ==
Pagnol was born on 28 February 1895 in Aubagne, Bouches-du-Rhône department, in southern France near Marseille, the eldest son of schoolteacher Joseph Pagnol^{A} and seamstress Augustine Lansot.^{B} He was secretly baptised at the Église Saint-Charles in Marseilles. Marcel Pagnol grew up in Marseille with his younger brothers Paul and René, and younger sister Germaine.

=== School years ===
In July 1904, the family rented the Bastide Neuve, – a house in La Treille – for the summer holidays, the first of many spent in the hilly countryside between Aubagne and Marseille. About the same time, Augustine's health, began to decline and on 16 June 1910 she succumbed to a chest infection ("mal de poitrine") and died, aged 36. Joseph remarried in 1912.

In 1913, at the age of 18, Marcel passed his baccalaureate in philosophy and started studying literature at the university in Aix-en-Provence. At the start of World War I, he was drafted into the infantry at Nice but in January 1915 he was discharged because of his poor constitution ("faiblesse de constitution''). On 2 March 1916, he married Simone Colin in Marseille and in November graduated in English. He became an English teacher, teaching in various local colleges and at a lycée in Marseille.

== Career ==
=== Time in Paris ===
In 1922, he moved to Paris, where he taught English until 1927, when he decided instead to devote his life to playwriting. During this time, he belonged to a group of young writers, in collaboration with one of whom, Paul Nivoix, he wrote the play, Merchants of Glory, which was produced in 1924. This was followed, in 1928, by Topaze, a satire based on ambition. Exiled in Paris, he returned to La Treille, where he set his play Marius, which later became the first of his works to be adapted into a film in 1931.

Separated from Simone Collin since 1926 (though not divorced until 1941), he formed a relationship with the young English dancer Kitty Murphy. Their son Jacques Pagnol was born on 24 September 1930. (Jacques later became his father's assistant and subsequently a cameraman for France 3 Marseille.)

=== Filmmaking career ===
In 1929, on a visit to London, Pagnol attended a screening of one of the first talking films and he was so impressed that he decided to devote his efforts to cinema. He contacted Paramount Picture studios and suggested adapting his play Marius for cinema. The film was directed by Alexander Korda and released on 10 October 1931. It became one of the first successful French-language talking films.

In 1932, Pagnol founded his own film production studios in the countryside near Marseille. Over the next decade Pagnol produced his own films, taking many different roles in the production – financier, director, script writer, studio head, and foreign-language script translator – and employing the greatest French actors of the period, also owning film laboratories and several movie theaters in Marseille. Pagnol built a production system that was nearly unique as it allowed him to control all the aspects of his film's production, including distribution. His business came to a near-complete end during World War II as both the Nazi occupiers and the Vichy administration wanted to get hold of his film studio's equipment. Pagnol pretexted that his company was failing in order to sell it to Gaumont, and even destroyed the copies of his latest project, La Prière aux étoiles, so the German-controlled Continental Films could not get hold of it. He only kept one theater in Marseille. After the war, Pagnol created a new production company and rebuilt his filmmaking activity. On 4 April 1946, Pagnol was elected to the Académie française, taking his seat in March 1947, the first filmmaker to receive this honour.

=== Themes of Pagnol's films ===
In his films, Pagnol transfers his playwriting talents onto the big screen. His editing style is somberly reserved, placing emphasis on the content of an image. As a pictorial naturalist, Pagnol relies on film as art to convey a deeper meaning rather than solely as a tool to tell a story. Pagnol also took great care in the type of actors he employed, hiring local actors to appear in his films to highlight their unique accents and culture. Like his plays, Pagnol's films emphasize dialogue and musicality. The themes of many of Pagnol's films revolve around the acute observation of social rituals. Using interchangeable symbols and recurring character roles, such as proud fathers and rebellious children, Pagnol illuminates the provincial life of the lower class. Notably, Pagnol also frequently compares women and land, showing both can be barren or fertile. Above all, Pagnol uses all this to illustrate the importance of human bonds and their renewal.

=== As a novelist ===
In 1945, Pagnol remarried to actress Jacqueline Bouvier, later known as Jacqueline Pagnol. They had two children together, Frédéric (born 1946) and Estelle (born 1951). Estelle died at the age of two from encephalitis. Pagnol was so devastated that he fled the south and returned to live in Paris. He went back to writing plays, but after his next piece was badly received he decided to change his job once more and began writing a series of autobiographical novels – Souvenirs d'enfance – based on his childhood experiences.

In 1957, the first two novels in the series, La Gloire de mon père and Le château de ma mère were published to instant acclaim. The third Le Temps des secrets was published in 1959, the fourth Le Temps des Amours was to remain unfinished and was not published until 1977, after his death. In the meantime, Pagnol turned to a second series, L'Eau des Collines – Jean de Florette and Manon des Sources – which focused on the machinations of Provençal peasant life at the beginning of the twentieth century and were published in 1962. L'Eau des collines was itself based on the film Manon des Sources, which Pagnol had directed in 1952 with his wife Jacqueline in the title role.

== Later life ==
Pagnol appeared before a review committee of the Parisian Comite Regional Interprofessionnel d'Epuration on 27 November 1946 for three charges of collaboration. His charges were for adding Philippe Pétain's armistice speech into The Well-Digger's Daughter, allowing La France en Marche, a Vichy propaganda film series, to be processed at his laboratories in Marseille, and distributing a propaganda short about the attack on Mers-el-Kébir. Pagnol defended himself as the Germans banned The Well-Digger's Daughter in 1941 and only unbanned it after the Pétain scene was removed and that the Vichy government seized his studios, personnel, and distribution services. All charges against him were dismissed on 3 February 1947. By that time, Pagnol had restarted his filmmaking career with Naïs.

Pagnol's second marriage, with actress Jacqueline Pagnol, brought newfound happiness in his private life. In 1952, he gave Jacqueline the title role of Manon of the Spring, a two-part, 4-hour long film that he had written especially for her. In 1954, the death of their daughter Estelle was a tragedy from which he never quite recovered; he stopped making film afterwards. Jacqueline's support helped him write his successful books during the following years.

Pagnol died in Paris on 18 April 1974. He is buried in Marseille at the cemetery La Treille, along with his mother, father, brothers, and wife. His boyhood friend, David Magnan (Lili des Bellons in the autobiographies), who died at the Second Battle of the Marne in July 1918, is buried nearby.

== Translations ==
Pagnol was also known for his translations of Shakespeare (from English) and Virgil (from Latin):

- 1944 : Le Songe d'une nuit d'été (A Midsummer Night's Dream) by William Shakespeare, first presented in 1947, at the Grand Théâtre de Monaco; Paris, Œuvres complètes, Club de l'Honnête Homme, 1971
- 1947 : Hamlet by William Shakespeare, Paris, Nagel
- 1958 : Bucoliques (The Eclogues) by Virgil, Paris, Grasset

Pagnol's Hamlet is still performed in France, although some have criticized his portrayal of Hamlet as somewhat effeminate.

== Film adaptations ==
In 1986, the two volumes of The Water of the Hills were adapted by filmmaker Claude Berri into the two films Jean de Florette and Manon des Sources.

In 1990, La Gloire de mon père and Le château de ma mère, Pagnol's affectionate reminiscences of childhood, were filmed by Yves Robert.

In 2000, Jacques Nahum produced Marius, Fanny, and César for French television.

In 2011, La Fille du puisatier was remade by Daniel Auteuil.

In 2013, Marius and Fanny were remade, also by Daniel Auteuil.

In 2022, Le Temps Des Secrets was adapted and filmed by Christophe Barratier.

== Awards ==
- 1939: Best foreign film for Harvest - New York Film Critics Circle Awards
- 1940: Best foreign film for The Baker's Wife - New York Film Critics Circle Awards
- 1950: Best foreign film for Jofroi - New York Film Critics Circle Awards

== Tribute ==
On 28 February 2020 Google celebrated his 125th birthday with a Google Doodle.

=== Filmography ===
Year	Film	Director	Writer	Producer	Notes
1931	Marius	No	Yes	Yes	based on Pagnol’s 1929 play
1932	Fanny	No	Yes	Yes	based on Pagnol’s 1931 play
1934	Jofroi	Yes	Yes	No	US release in 1950 as part of The Ways of Love anthology
1934	Angèle	Yes	Yes	Yes	based on 1929 novel Un de Baumugnes by Jean Giono
1934	Tartarin de Tarascon (English title: Tartarin of Tarascon)	No	Yes	Yes	based on novel by Alphonse Daudet
1935	Merlusse	Yes	Yes	Yes	remade in 2023 by Alexander Payne as The Holdovers
1935	Cigalon	Yes	Yes	Yes	
1936	Topaze	Yes	Yes	Yes	first version; based on Pagnol’s 1928 play
1936	César	Yes	Yes	Yes	
1937	Regain (English title: Harvest)	Yes	Yes	Yes	
1938	Le schpountz (English title: Heartbeat)	Yes	Yes	Yes	remade in 1999 by Gérard Oury
1938	La femme du boulanger (English title: The Baker’s Wife)	Yes	Yes	No	adapted by Stephen Schwartz for 1976 musical The Baker's Wife
1939	Monsieur Brotonneau	No	Yes	Yes	
1940	La Fille du puisatier (English title: The Well-Digger's Daughter)	Yes	Yes	Yes	remade in 2011 by Daniel Auteuil
1941	La Prière aux étoiles	Yes	Yes	Yes	unfinished, destroyed
1945	Naïs	No	Yes	Yes	directed by Raymond Leboursier, uncredited co-direction by Pagnol
1949	La Belle Meunière (English title: The Pretty Miller Girl)	Yes	Yes	No	Pagnol’s first color film
1950	Le rosier de Madame Husson (English title: The Prize; literal translation "The rose of Madame Husson")	No	Yes	No	based on novella by Guy de Maupassant
1951	Topaze	Yes	Yes	Yes	second version; based on Pagnol’s 1928 play
1952	Manon des sources (English title: Manon of the Spring)	Yes	Yes	Yes	later novelized and expanded as L'Eau des collines; and subsequently remade in 1986 in two parts as Jean de Florette and Manon des Sources by Claude Berri
1954	Les lettres de mon moulin (English title: Letters from My Windmill)	Yes	Yes	Yes	

== Bibliography ==
- Merchants of Glory (1925, theatre play)
- Jazz (1926, theatre play)
- Topaze (1928, theatre play)
- Marius (1929, theatre play)
- Fanny (1932, theatre play)
- César (1936, theatre play)
- La Gloire de mon père and Le Château de ma mère (1957, autobiographies)
- Le Temps des secrets (1959, autobiography)
- L'Eau des collines (1962, novel, in two volumes: Jean de Florette and Manon des Sources)
- Le Temps des amours (1977, autobiography)
- Le Masque de Fer (1965, essay)
- Le secret du Masque de Fer (1973, essay; 2nd expanded edition)

== See also ==
- Lycée Français International Marcel Pagnol

== Notes ==
- ^A Born 25 October 1869. Died 8 November 1951, age 82.
- ^B Born 11 September 1873. Died 16 June 1910, age 36.

== Works cited ==
- Bowles, Brett (2009). "Accommodating Vichy: the politics of Marcel Pagnol's La Fille du puisatier". Historical Reflections. 35 (2). Berghahn Books.
- Castans, Raymond (1987). Marcel Pagnol. Éditions Jean-Claude Lattès. ISBN 978-2-7096-0622-6
