= My Mother's Castle (film) =

- Directed by: Yves Robert
- Written by: Marcel Pagnol (novel); Yves Robert; Jérôme Tonnerre; Yves Robert
- Produced by: Alain Poiré
- Starring: Philippe Caubère; Nathalie Roussel; Thérèse Liotard; Julien Ciamaca
- Narrated by: Jean-Pierre Darras
- Cinematography: Robert Alazraki
- Edited by: Pierre Gillette
- Music by: Vladimir Cosma
- Distributed by: Gaumont Distribution
- Release date: 26 October 1990
- Running time: 98 minutes
- Country: France
- Language: French

My Mother's Castle (original French title: Le château de ma mère) is a 1990 French film directed by Yves Robert, based on the book of the same name by Marcel Pagnol, the second volume of his Souvenirs d'enfance. It is a sequel to My Father's Glory, also filmed by Robert in 1990.

== Plot ==
This film, together with My Father's Glory, is set in the period between 1900 and the First World War in 1914. Following the summer holiday which features in My Father's Glory, the family returns to Marseille but Marcel still yearns for the hills. His wish is granted when they return for the Christmas holiday, much to Marcel's delight. Although only a few kilometers outside Marseille, the journey to the holiday home is time-consuming as public transport takes them only a short portion of the way and the rest is a walk along a long, winding road.

Marcel then tells of an encounter with a girl, Isabelle. He meets her while out in the hills collecting thyme for his mother, and they plan to meet at her house in the future to play. On his first visit to her house he meets her mother, an eccentric who appears to disapprove of his scruffy demeanour. On a subsequent visit, Marcel meets her father, another eccentric who drinks absinthe to aid his poetic composition. Isabelle herself is also a bit strange, always dressing up in different dresses, and demanding that Marcel dress up as a dog, a soldier, and a slave. When they play, Isabelle commands Marcel to do various tasks, which he obliges. At one point, she tells him to close his eyes and open his mouth. She then feeds him a grasshopper. Lili and Paul, Marcel's younger brother, observe this, and they report it to Marcel's father. He then forbids Marcel to continue meeting "with that crazy girl". Marcel later observes the departure of Isabelle and her family.

One day, when travelling to their house, the family encounters one of Marcel's father's former pupils, who now works in maintaining a canal which runs from the hills into Marseille. The canal runs across private estates and so he is issued with a key which allows him to pass through several locked doors along the towpath. The employee points out to the family that this is a shortcut which will allow them to reach their house in a fraction of the journey time and offers them his spare key. Marcel's father, being honest and upright realises that this would amount to trespassing. He nevertheless accepts the key after much persuasion from his family for use in an emergency.

Despite his reservations, the family use the key more and more and the reduced journey time allows them to visit the holiday home every weekend. They still have an apprehension each time they unlock a door fearing they will be caught. As time passes, however, they encounter the owner of one property and the groundsman of another, who are friendly and quite happy that they cross their land.

At the beginning of the summer holidays they make the journey again and Marcel's mother feels a great fear and trepidation of meeting the owner. When they reach the final door they discover it has been padlocked. They are confronted by the caretaker of the final property who has been watching them for some time and who decides to make an official report.

Marcel's father is devastated, believing a complaint could damage his career prospects and he could possibly lose his job as a school teacher. The employees of the canal however, confront the caretaker threatening him with prosecution for having unlawfully padlocked one of the company's doors. The caretaker withdraws his complaint against Marcel's family and the matter is concluded. Unfortunately during the ordeal between the canal workers and the caretaker they take the padlock, put it around the gate, and give the key to his dog so he can't leave the estate.

The epilogue mentions that uncle Jules hired a carriage for the family. The film jumps 5 years to the future, telling of the death of Marcel's mother. It also tells of Lili and Paul: Paul was a goatherd in the countryside of the Provence, until his sudden death at the age of 31. Lili is killed in 1917, during the First World War. Marcel is the only one left of their childhood company, now a successful film director. His company has purchased a large old house in the Marseille area to turn into a film studio. When walking through the grounds he sees a familiar door and realizes that this is the last property on his childhood journey to his holiday home. In a burst of rage he picks up a rock and smashes the door and thus ends a bad spell.

== Cast and roles ==
- Philippe Caubère as Joseph Pagnol
- Nathalie Roussel as Augustine Pagnol
- Didier Pain as Uncle Jules
- Thérèse Liotard as Aunt Rose
- Julien Ciamaca as Marcel Pagnol
- Victorien Delamare as Paul Pagnol
- Joris Molinas as Lili des Bellons
- Julie Timmerman as Isabelle Cassignol
- Paul Crauchet as Edmond des Parpaillouns AKA Mond des Parpaillouns
- Phillipe Uchan as Bouzigue
- Patrick Préjean as Dominique, the gardener
- Pierre Maguelon as François
- Michel Modo as the postman
- Jean Carmet as the drunk guard
- Jean Rochefort as Adolphe Cassingol AKA Loïs de Montmajour
- Georges Wilson as the count
- Ticky Holgado as Binucci
- Jean-Marie Juan as Fenestrelle
- René Loyon as Mr Besson
- Jean-Pierre Darras as the narrator (voice of Marcel)

== Reception ==
On review aggregator website Rotten Tomatoes, the film holds an approval rating of 73% based on 11 reviews, with an average rating of 7.2/10.
