= Cyrano de Bergerac (1990 film) =

1990 film by Jean-Paul Rappeneau

- Film poster
- Directed by: Jean-Paul Rappeneau
- Written by: Jean-Claude Carrière; Jean-Paul Rappeneau
- Based on: Cyrano de Bergerac; 1897 play by Edmond Rostand
- Produced by: René Cleitman; Michel Seydoux; André Szots
- Starring: Gérard Depardieu
- Cinematography: Pierre Lhomme
- Edited by: Noëlle Boisson
- Music by: Jean-Claude Petit
- Distributed by: UGC
- Release date: 28 March 1990 (France)
- Running time: 137 minutes
- Countries: France; Hungary
- Language: French
- Budget: $15.3 million
- Box office: $41.3 million

Cyrano de Bergerac is a 1990 French period comedy-drama film directed by Jean-Paul Rappeneau and based on the 1897 play of the same name by Edmond Rostand, adapted by Jean-Claude Carrière and Rappeneau. It stars Gérard Depardieu, Anne Brochet and Vincent Perez. The film was a co-production between companies in France and Hungary.

The film is the first feature film version of Rostand's original play in colour, and the second theatrical film version of the play in the original French. It is also considerably more lavish and more faithful to the original than previous film versions of the play. The film had 4,732,136 admissions in France.

The film and the performance of Gérard Depardieu won numerous awards, notably 10 of the César Awards of 1991, two awards at the Cannes Film Festival and the People's Choice Award at the 15th Toronto International Film Festival.

Subtitles are used for the non-French market; the English-language version uses Anthony Burgess's translation of the text, which uses five-beat lines with a varying number of syllables and a regular couplet rhyming scheme, in other words, a sprung rhythm. Although he sustains the five-beat rhythm through most of the play, Burgess sometimes allows this structure to break deliberately: in Act V, he allows it to collapse completely, creating free verse.

In 2010, Cyrano de Bergerac was ranked number 43 in Empire magazine's "The 100 Best Films Of World Cinema".

== Plot ==
In 1640, the Gascon poet and swashbuckler Cyrano de Bergerac is self-conscious about his enormous nose, but pretends to be proud of it. He is admired and respected by many people for his bravery and good swordsmanship. He madly loves his cousin, the beautiful Roxane; however, he is sure that she will reject him because of his appearance. To elevate himself in her eyes, he interferes with a play being staged at the Hôtel du Bourgogne, in Paris, and wins a duel with a marquis.

In the second act of the play and film, Cyrano meets with Roxane at her request. He is crushed when Roxane tells him she is infatuated with Christian de Neuvillette, a handsome and dashing new recruit to the Cadets de Gascogne (the military unit in which Cyrano is serving). However, Cyrano learns that Christian is tongue-tied when speaking with women. Seeing an opportunity to vicariously declare his love to Roxane, Cyrano approaches Christian with a proposal: Cyrano will write the love letters, and Christian will woo Roxane with them. Christian agrees.

Cyrano aids Christian, writing heartfelt love letters and poems. Roxane begins to appreciate Christian, not only for his good looks but also his apparent eloquence. She eventually falls in love with him. But the Comte de Guiche, an arrogant and exceptionally powerful older nobleman, also has designs on Roxane. Roxane and Cyrano thwart De Guiche's attempt to visit Roxane by arranging a quick secret marriage between Roxane and Christian. In revenge, De Guiche orders his company of cadets—including Cyrano and Christian—to report immediately for military duty in the Siege of Arras against the Spanish.

The siege is harsh and brutal: the Cadets de Gascogne are starving. Christian does not know that Cyrano escapes over enemy lines twice each day to deliver a love letter written by Cyrano himself but signed with Christian's name, sent to Roxane. These letters draw Roxane out from the city of Paris to the war front to bring food to the troops. Although she has come to visit Christian, she admits to him that she has fallen in love with the author's soul, and would love the author even if he were ugly. Christian tries to find out whether Roxane loves him or Cyrano, and asks Cyrano to find out. However, during the subsequent battle, Christian is mortally wounded. The scene ends with the French returning to the battle.

In the final scene of the play and film, in 1654, Roxane has entered a convent and retired from the world. Cyrano has made many enemies with his writings; he is still free, but now poor. During this time, Cyrano has faithfully visited Roxane every week, never declaring his love. On this day, his enemies attack and mortally injure him. Cyrano nevertheless visits Roxane at the convent. When she mentions Christian's last letter, sensing his own mortality, Cyrano asks if he can read it. Roxane gives him the letter, which he reads movingly. Just before Cyrano dies, Roxane realizes that she has loved him all along.

== Cast ==
- Gérard Depardieu as Cyrano de Bergerac
- Anne Brochet as Roxane
- Vincent Perez as Christian de Neuvillette
- Jacques Weber as Comte Antoine de Guiche
- Roland Bertin as Ragueneau
- Philippe Morier-Genoud as Le Bret
- Pierre Maguelon as Carbon de Castle-Jaloux
- Sandrine Kiberlain as Sister Colette
- Josiane Stoléru as the Duenna
- Philippe Volter as Vicomte de Valvert
- Jean-Marie Winling as Lignière
- Louis Navarre as The Bore
- Gabriel Monnet as Montfleury
- François Marié as Bellerose
- Anatole Delalande as The child
- Alain Rimoux as The father
- Michel Fau as Ragueneau's Poet

== Reception ==
=== Critical response ===
On Rotten Tomatoes, the film holds an approval rating of 100% based on 26 reviews, with a weighted average rating of 8.0/10. The site's critical consensus reads, "Love and hope soar in Cyrano De Bergerac, an immensely entertaining romance featuring Gerard Depardieu at his peak." On Metacritic, the film has a score of 79 based on 19 reviews, indicating "generally favorable reviews".

Roger Ebert from the Chicago Sun-Times awarded the film three and a half stars out of four. In his review on the film, Ebert wrote, "Cyrano de Bergerac is a splendid movie not just because it tells its romantic story, and makes it visually delightful, and centers it on Depardieu, but for a better reason: The movie acts as if it believes this story. Depardieu is not a satirist - not here, anyway. He plays Cyrano on the level, for keeps."

Author and film critic Leonard Maltin awarded the film three and a half out of four stars, calling it "the definitive screen version of the Edmond Rostand perennial". In his review, Maltin praised the film's staging of scenes, while also noting that the film somewhat faltered during the finale by being overextended.

=== Accolades ===
The film was nominated for five Academy Awards at the 1990 ceremony. It marked the second time that an actor had been nominated for Best Actor for his portrayal of Cyrano de Bergerac. (The first time was in 1950, when José Ferrer won the award for his performance in the English-language version of the film.)

Award	Category	Nominee(s)	Result	Ref.
Academy Awards	Best Foreign Language Film	France	Nominated	
Academy Awards	Best Actor	Gérard Depardieu	Nominated	
Academy Awards	Best Art Direction	Art Direction: Ezio Frigerio; Set Decoration: Jacques Rouxel	Nominated	
Academy Awards	Best Costume Design	Franca Squarciapino	Won	
Academy Awards	Best Makeup	Michèle Burke and Jean-Pierre Eychenne	Nominated	
British Academy Film Awards	Best Film Not in the English Language	Rene Cleitman, Michel Seydoux, and Jean-Paul Rappeneau	Nominated	
British Academy Film Awards	Best Actor in a Leading Role	Gérard Depardieu	Nominated	
British Academy Film Awards	Best Adapted Screenplay	Jean-Paul Rappeneau and Jean-Claude Carrière	Nominated	
British Academy Film Awards	Best Cinematography	Pierre Lhomme	Won	
British Academy Film Awards	Best Costume Design	Franca Squarciapino	Won	
British Academy Film Awards	Best Make-Up	Jean-Pierre Eychenne and Michèle Burke	Won	
British Academy Film Awards	Best Original Film Score	Jean-Claude Petit	Nominated	
British Academy Film Awards	Best Production Design	Ezio Frigerio	Nominated	
British Society of Cinematographers Awards	Best Cinematography in a Theatrical Feature Film	Pierre Lhomme	Won	
Cannes Film Festival	Palme d'Or	Jean-Paul Rappeneau	Nominated	
Cannes Film Festival	Best Actor	Gérard Depardieu	Won	
Cannes Film Festival	Technical Grand Prize	Pierre Lhomme	Won	
César Awards (1990)	Best Film	Jean-Paul Rappeneau	Won	
César Awards (1990)	Best Director	Jean-Paul Rappeneau	Won	
César Awards (1990)	Best Actor	Gérard Depardieu	Won	
César Awards (1990)	Best Actress	Anne Brochet	Nominated	
César Awards (1990)	Best Supporting Actor	Jacques Weber	Won	
César Awards (1990)	Most Promising Actor	Vincent Pérez	Nominated	
César Awards (1990)	Best Original Screenplay or Adaptation	Jean-Claude Carrière and Jean-Paul Rappeneau	Nominated	
César Awards (1990)	Best Cinematography	Pierre Lhomme	Won	
César Awards (1990)	Best Costume Design	Franca Squarciapino	Won	
César Awards (1990)	Best Editing	Noëlle Boisson	Won	
César Awards (1990)	Best Original Music	Jean-Claude Petit	Won	
César Awards (1990)	Best Production Design	Ezio Frigerio	Won	
César Awards (1990)	Best Sound	Pierre Gamet and Dominique Hennequin	Won	
César Awards (1994)	César des Césars	Jean-Paul Rappeneau	Won	
Chicago Film Critics Association Awards	Best Foreign Film	Jean-Paul Rappeneau	Nominated	
Dallas-Fort Worth Film Critics Association Awards	Best Foreign Language Film		Nominated	
Dallas-Fort Worth Film Critics Association Awards	Best Actor	Gérard Depardieu	Nominated	
David di Donatello Awards	Best Foreign Film	Jean-Paul Rappeneau	Won (Note: Tied with Franco Zeffirelli for Hamlet.)	
David di Donatello Awards	Best Foreign Actor	Gérard Depardieu	Nominated	
European Film Awards	Best Film	France	Nominated	
European Film Awards	Best Actor	Gérard Depardieu	Nominated	
European Film Awards	Best Actress	Anne Brochet	Nominated	
European Film Awards	Best Cinematography	Pierre Lhomme	Nominated	
European Film Awards	Best Film Composer	Jean-Claude Petit	Nominated	
European Film Awards	Best Production Design	Ezio Frigerio and Franca Squarciapino	Won	
Golden Globe Awards	Best Foreign Language Film	France	Won	
London Film Critics Circle Awards	Foreign Language Film of the Year	France	Won	
London Film Critics Circle Awards	Actor of the Year	Gérard Depardieu	Won	
Los Angeles Film Critics Association Awards	Best Foreign Language Film	France	Runner-up	
Nastro d'Argento	European Silver Ribbon	Jean-Paul Rappeneau	Nominated	
Nastro d'Argento	Best Costume Design	Franca Squarciapino	Won	
Nastro d'Argento	Best Production Design	Ezio Frigerio	Won	
National Board of Review Awards	Top Five Foreign Language Films		Won	
National Board of Review Awards	Best Foreign Language Film	France	Won	
New York Film Critics Circle Awards	Best Foreign Language Film	France	Runner-up	
Toronto International Film Festival	People's Choice Award	Jean-Paul Rappeneau	Won	
Turkish Film Critics Association Awards	Best Foreign Film		7th Place	

== Home media ==
Cyrano de Bergerac was released on DVD by Umbrella Entertainment in May 2005 as part of a collection with the 1950 version. The DVD is compatible with all region codes and includes special features such as the theatrical trailer, Umbrella Entertainment trailers, talent biographies, an interview with Gérard Depardieu and a Roger Ebert review. In February 2009 an Academy Award edition was released by Umbrella Entertainment.

== See also ==
- List of submissions to the 63rd Academy Awards for Best Foreign Language Film
- List of French submissions for the Academy Award for Best Foreign Language Film
