= Franca Squarciapino =

Italian costume designer

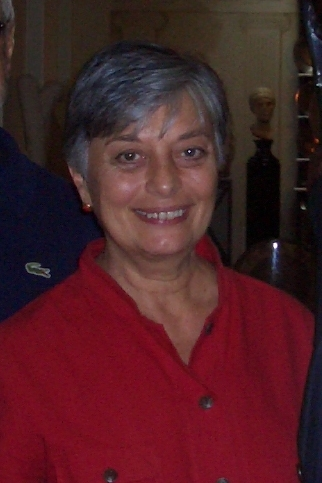

Franca Squarciapino (born 1940) is an Italian costume designer recognized for her exceptional work in theatre and film. She won the Academy Award for Best Costume Design in 1990 for her work on Cyrano de Bergerac. Throughout her career, she has designed costumes for major theatres and opera houses, including the Burgtheater in Vienna, the Royal Opera at Covent Garden, the Metropolitan Opera, the Vienna State Opera, and the Zurich Opera, among others.

Squarciapino frequently collaborated with Ezio Frigerio (1930–2022), who was also her life partner.
