= Ezio Frigerio =

Italian costume designer and art director (1930–2022)

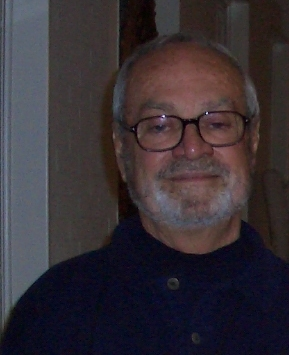
- Frigerio in 2007
- Born: 16 July 1930; Erba, Milan, Italy
- Died: 2 February 2022 (aged 91); Lecco, Italy
- Occupations: Costume designer, art director

Ezio Frigerio (16 July 1930 – 2 February 2022) was an Italian costume designer and art director.

== Career ==
After finishing architecture studies, he approached theatre art by realising the costumes for Casa di Bambola and L'opera da 3 soldi, two plays directed by Giorgio Strehler at Piccolo Teatro in the 1955-56 theatre season. From then on a fertile artistic marriage started between art director and producer, setting up several unique productions as I giganti della montagna (1966), Santa Giovanna dei macelli (1970), Re Lear (1972), Il temporale (1980), L'Illusion Comique, which premiered in 1984 at Théatre de l'Odéon in Paris, La grande magia, which premiered in 1985 and was reprised several times.

The collaboration with Strehler made Frigerio enter the world of opera: Mozart's Le Nozze di Figaro, Don Giovanni and Così fan tutte were realized by Strehler and Frigerio between 1973 and 1996. Così fan tutte was being staged just before Strehler died.

Frigerio also created stage designs for the Burgtheater in Vienna: Trilogie der Sommerfrische (Trilogia della villeggiatura) by Carlo Goldoni, directed by Strehler, 1974; Judith by Hebbel, directed by Gerhard Klingenberg, 1975.

Other operatic stage designs include: Cherubini's Medea, directed by Liliana Cavani, for the Opéra National de Paris; Strauss' Elektra, directed by Nuria Espert, for De Munt Theatre in Brussels; Verdi's Ernani, directed by Luca Ronconi, 1980, Beethoven's Fidelio, directed by Werner Herzog in 1999 for the Teatro alla Scala in Milan; Bellini's Norma, directed by Piero Faggioni, for the Vienna State Opera in 1977; Verdi's Rigoletto, for the Polish National Opera in 1997. The team of Frigerio and Squarciapiano also designed the Met Opera's gorgeous and sensational Zandonai FRANCESCA DA RIMINI in 1984 (Scotto, Domingo, MacNeil, Levine).

Frigerio also created the sets for Liliana Cavani's movie Galileo e i Cannibali and Jean-Paul Rappeneau's Cyrano de Bergerac, which got an Oscar nomination in 1991.

He designed the grave of Rudolf Nureyev. Frigerio often collaborated with Italian costume designer Franca Squarciapino, who was also his life partner.

== Death ==
Frigerio died on 2 February 2022, at the age of 91.

== Notes ==
- Henderson, Marina (1992), 'Frigerio, Ezio' in The New Grove Dictionary of Opera, ed. Stanley Sadie (London) ISBN 0-333-73432-7
- Ezio Frigerio at IMDb
- Zurich Opera biography (German), accessed 25 January 2010
