= Historical Reflections =

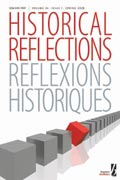
- Discipline: History
- Language: English, French
- Edited by: Elisabeth Macknight

Publication details
- History: 1974-present
- Publisher: Berghahn Books
- Frequency: Triannually

Standard abbreviations
- ISO 4: Hist. Reflect.

Indexing
- ISSN: 0315-7997 (print); 1939-2419 (web)

Links
- Journal homepage

Historical Reflections (fr: Réflexions Historiques) is a peer-reviewed academic journal of history published by Berghahn Books. Established in 1974, the journal publishes articles in both English and French. HR/RH promotes interdisciplinary and comparative scholarship, including historical approaches to the intersection of art, literature, and the social sciences, as well as mentalities and intellectual and religious movements. The editor-in-chief is independent scholar Elisabeth Macknight. The co-editor is Brian Newsome of Georgia College & State University.

The journal was published by the University of Waterloo from 1974 until 1989, then by Alfred University's Division of Human Studies until 2008, when it became a joint publication of Alfred University and Berghahn Books. The journal is now published solely by Berghahn Books. HR/RH was edited first by Stanley K. Johannesen (University of Waterloo), then by Stuart Campbell for most of the time after it moved to Alfred University. Daniel Gordon (UMass Amherst) and Linda Mitchell (then at Alfred University) joined Campbell as co-editors in 2003 and 2004, respectively. Mitchell became senior editor upon Campbell's retirement in 2006 and recruited Brian Newsome (then at Elizabethtown College) as co-editor in 2012. Mitchell, who moved to the University of Missouri at Kansas City, brought new scholars, such as Elisabeth Macknight, onto the editorial board, and she forged the journal's relationship with Berghahn Books. Elisabeth Macknight became senior-editor upon Mitchell's retirement from the journal in 2018.

== Abstracting and indexing ==
Historical Reflections/Réflexions Historiques is indexed and abstracted in:

American Bibliography of Slavic and East European Studies (University of Illinois)

Arts & Humanities Citation Index (Web of Science) ATLA Religion Database (American Theological Library Association) Bibliographie annuelle de l'histoire de France Bibliometric Research Indicator List (BFI) British Humanities Index (CSA/ProQuest) Canadian Essay and Literature Index (Owen Sound Library) Current Contents – Arts & Humanities (Web of Science) European Reference Index for the Humanities and the Social Sciences (ERIH PLUS) Feminae: Medieval Women and Gender Index (Haverford College) French Historical Studies Historical Abstracts (CSA/ProQuest) Humanities Abstracts (H.W. Wilson) Humanities Index (H.W. Wilson) IBR – International Bibliography of Book Reviews of Scholarly Literature on the Humanities and Social Sciences (De Gruyter) IBZ – International Bibliography of Periodical Literature (De Gruyter) International Medieval Bibliography (University of Leeds) MLA Directory of Periodicals MLA International Bibliography National Library of Medicine (PubMed) Norwegian Register for Scientific Journals, Series and Publishers Periodicals Index Online (Chadwyck-Healy/ProQuest) Science of Religion Sociological Abstracts (CSA/ProQuest) Social Services Abstracts (CSA/ProQuestz) Scopus (Elsevier)

Worldwide Political Science Abstracts (CSA/ProQuest)
