= The Well-Digger's Daughter (1940 film) =

1940 film by Marcel Pagnol

- Theatrical release poster
- Directed by: Marcel Pagnol
- Written by: Marcel Pagnol; Herman G. Weinberg (English titles)
- Produced by: Marcel Pagnol
- Starring: Raimu; Fernandel; Josette Day
- Cinematography: Willy
- Edited by: Jeannette Ginestet
- Music by: Vincent Scotto
- Distributed by: Siritzky International Pictures Corporation (USA)
- Release date: 20 December 1940
- Running time: 170 minutes
- Country: France
- Language: French

The Well-Digger's Daughter (French: La Fille du puisatier) is a 1940 French romantic comedy drama film directed by Marcel Pagnol.

== Plot ==
Patricia, a peasant, becomes pregnant by Jacques, a military pilot from a local family. As war breaks out, Jacques serves in World War II, but his family refuses to support his child and likewise, Patricia's father expels her from her home. Patricia stays with her aunt and gives birth to a boy. After Jacques is reported killed in the war, both families wish to meet their new grandchild. Jacques is not dead, however; he returns and Patricia agrees to marry him.

== Selected cast ==
- Raimu as Pascal Amoretti
- Fernandel as Félipe Rambert
- Josette Day as Patricia Amoretti
- Line Noro as Marie Mazel
- Georges Grey as Jacques Mazel
- Fernand Charpin as Monsieur Mazel
- Milly Mathis as Nathalie
- Clairette as Amanda Amoretti
- Roberte Arnaud as Roberte Amoretti
- Raymonde as Éléonore Amoretti

== Reception ==
In the film's most famous scene, Patricia and Jacques' families and the rest of the village listen to Philippe Pétain's speech of 17 June 1940 announcing the need for an armistice in the Battle of France. Because of the scene La Fille du puisatier has been called the first "Vichy film". Most of the filming occurred before Pétain's speech on the defeat of the French Third Republic, the scene with the speech was added later.

French actor Daniel Auteuil wrote, directed, and starred in a remake of this film in 2011.
