= Jean-Claude Petit =

French composer (born 1943)

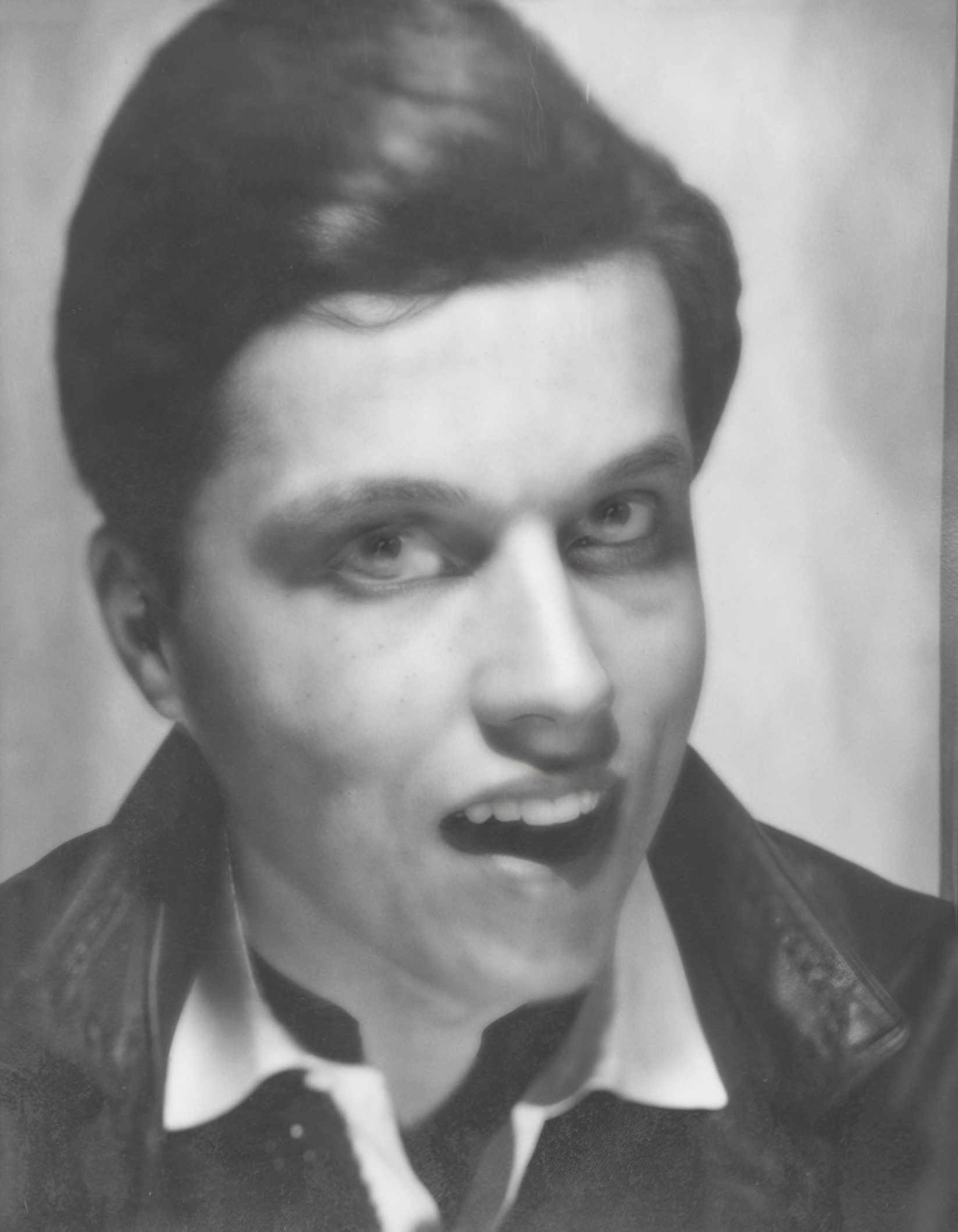
Image of J.C.Petit

Jean-Claude Petit (born 14 November 1943) is a French composer and arranger, born in Vaires-sur-Marne. After accompanying jazzmen in his childhood, Petit went to the Conservatoire de Paris, where he studied harmony and counterpoint. He did the string arrangements for Mink DeVille's Le Chat Bleu album, as well as orchestrating the backing parts to some French pop singles in the mid-to-late 1960s, including those of Erick Saint-Laurent and yé-yé girls Christine Pilzer and Monique Thubert.

In 1973 he composed La leçon de Michette. The song was popular in Italy due to its use in the soundtrack of a well-known Carosello (the Italian TV spot broadcast) from 1973 to 1976.

As a music ghostwriter for director Michel Magne, Petit did not get credit for his film scores until he was 36.

1979 saw his first major film soundtrack commission (Alexandro Jodorowsky's Tusk), but he had been releasing solo records at least a decade earlier, including at least four for the Chappell Music Library, as well as his album Chez Jean-Claude Petit, released in the early 1970s. In 1976 he collaborated with Pierre Delanoë, Toto Cutugno, Vito Pallavicini in a very popular and funky music for Mireille Mathieu called Ciao Bambino, Sorry. In addition, he was a frequent collaborator with French film music composer Jack Arel: the pair's most well-known production, "Psychedelic Portrait", was featured in an episode of the cult TV series The Prisoner. His scores for The Return of the Musketeers (1989) and Cyrano de Bergerac (1990) remain perhaps his best known work internationally. In 1995 he was nominated for a Victoire de la Musique award in soundtrack of the year for L'Etudiante Etranger. Jean Claude conducted and arranged for American Orchestra leader Billy Vaughn in the 1970s: At least two of Billy's Paramount LPs "An Old Fashioned Love Song" PAS 6025 and "Greatest Country Hits" give Jean Claude credit as arranged/conductor. The 'Greatest Country Hits' Lp Paramount PAS 6044 also includes a Jean Claude original "Walk A Country Mile".

== Filmography ==
- 1979: Tusk
- 1982: Lively Social Life
- 1985: Tranches de vie
- 1985: Billy-Ze One-Kick
- 1986: Jean de Florette
- 1986: Manon des Sources
- 1987: Fucking Fernand
- 1988: Savannah
- 1989: The Return of the Musketeers
- 1990: Cyrano de Bergerac (Colosseum CST 34.8046)
- 1990: Uranus
- 1991: Always Alone
- 1991: Mayrig
- 1992: 588, Street Paradises
- 1992: The Zebra
- 1992: The Playboys
- 1993: Lady Chatterley
- 1994: In Antonin Company Artaud
- 1995: The Horseman on the Roof
- 1996: Beaumarchais The Insolent One
- 1997: Messieurs les enfants
- 1998: Paddy
- 2000: Lumumba
- 2002: Like Your Father
- 2004: Podium
- 2007: Dance With Him
