= Uranus (film) =

- Directed by: Claude Berri; Arlette Langmann
- Written by: Claude Berri; Arlette Langmann based on a novel by Marcel Aymé
- Starring: Gérard Depardieu; Michel Blanc; Jean-Pierre Marielle
- Cinematography: Renato Berta
- Edited by: Hervé de Luze
- Music by: Jean-Claude Petit
- Production companies: Renn Productions; Films A2; D.D. Productions; Soficas Sofi-ARP; Investimage 3; Investimage 2
- Distributed by: AMLF
- Release date: 12 December 1990
- Country: France
- Language: French
- Box office: $19.1 million

Uranus is a 1990 French drama film with Gérard Depardieu about post-World War II recovery in a small French village, as the controlling French Communist Party tries to dispose of Pétain loyalists.

It was directed and written by Claude Berri and Arlette Langmann, based on a novel by Marcel Aymé. The film was entered into the 41st Berlin International Film Festival.

== Cast ==
- Michel Blanc as Gaigneux
- Gérard Depardieu as Léopold Lajeunesse
- Jean-Pierre Marielle as Archambaud
- Philippe Noiret as Watrin
- Gérard Desarthe as Maxime Loin
- Michel Galabru as Monglat
- Danièle Lebrun as Mrs. Archambaud
- Fabrice Luchini as Jourdan
- Daniel Prévost as Rochard
- Myriam Boyer as Mrs. Gaigneux
- Ticky Holgado as Mégrin, lawyer
- Vincent Grass as Ledieu
- Florence Darel as Miss Archambaud
- Yves Afonso as the brigadier
- Josiane Lévêque as Andréa Lajeunesse

== Reception ==
The film opened at number one at the Paris box office with a first week gross of 4.9 million Franc ($1 million) from 48 screens.
