= Le tatoué =

- Directed by: Denys de La Patellière
- Written by: Alphonse Boudard; Pascal Jardin
- Produced by: Raymond Danon; Robert Dorfmann
- Starring: Jean Gabin; Louis de Funès
- Cinematography: Sacha Vierny
- Edited by: Claude Durand
- Music by: Georges Garvarentz
- Distributed by: S.N. Prodis
- Release date: 18 September 1968
- Running time: 91 minutes
- Countries: France; Italy
- Language: French

Le tatoué, also known as The Million dollar tattoo, or The Tattoo, or The tattoo man, is a French-Italian comedy movie from 1968, directed by Denys de La Patellière, written by Alphonse Boudard, and starring by Jean Gabin and Louis de Funès.

== Plot ==
In an artist’s studio, rich Parisian art dealer Félicien Mézeray sees the old soldier Legrain, whose back has a tattoo by Modigliani. This he sells unseen to two American dealers and the rest of the film revolves around his efforts to literally get the skin off Legrain’s back. The price Legrain wants is the restoration of his old family home in the country, which turns out to be the huge crumbling castle of Paluel in remote Périgord, while he turns out to be the last and extremely eccentric Count of Montignac. The plot bears a very strong resemblance to Saki's short story The Background.

== Cast ==
- Jean Gabin : Comte Enguerand, Louis, Marie de Montignac alias Legrain (legionnaire)
- Louis de Funès : Félicien Mézeray
- Paul Mercey : Maurice Pello
- Jo Warfield : Larsen
- Donald von Kurtz : Smith
- Dominique Davray : Suzanne Mézeray
- Pierre Tornade : the policeman
