= The Little Gangster =

1990 film by Jacques Doillon

- Film poster
- Directed by: Jacques Doillon
- Written by: Jacques Doillon
- Produced by: Alain Sarde
- Starring: Richard Anconina
- Cinematography: William Lubtchansky
- Edited by: Catherine Quesemand
- Music by: Philippe Sarde
- Distributed by: AMLF
- Release date: 19 December 1990
- Running time: 100 minutes
- Country: France
- Language: French

The Little Gangster (French: Le Petit Criminel) is a 1990 French drama film directed by Jacques Doillon. It was entered into the 41st Berlin International Film Festival where it won an Honourable Mention.

== Cast ==
- Richard Anconina as Le flic, Gérard
- Gérald Thomassin as Le garçon, Marc
- Clotilde Courau as La soeur, Nathalie (Stéphanie)
- Jocelyne Perhirin as La mère
- Cécile Reigher as La vendeuse
- Daniel Villanova as Le principal
- Dominique Huchede as Le professeur
- Dominique Soler as La mère de Jérémy
- Ananda Regi as Jérémy
