= Anne Brochet =

French actress (born 1966)

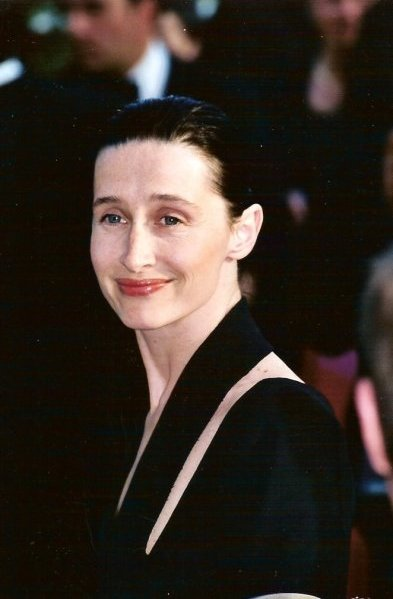
- Brochet in 2001
- Born: 22 November 1966 (age 59); Amiens, Somme, France
- Occupations: Actress, comedian
- Years active: 1986–present
- Partner: Gad Elmaleh (1998–2002)
- Children: 1

Anne Brochet (French: [an bʁɔʃe]; born 22 November 1966) is a French actress.

== Career ==
Brochet has appeared in films such as Cyrano de Bergerac, Le temps des porte-plumes, 30 ans, Une journée de merde! and Tous les matins du monde. She has also appeared in several episodes of the television show Voici venir l'orage.... Brochet won a César Award in the Best Supporting Actress category for her work in Tous les matins du monde.

== Private life ==
Brochet lived with actor Gad Elmaleh from 1998 to 2002. They had one son, Noé.

Brochet has also published four novels.

== Filmography ==
Year	Film	Role	Director
1987	Masques	Catherine	Claude Chabrol
1987	Buisson ardent	Elisabeth	Laurent Perrin
1988	La Nuit Bengali	Guertie	Nicolas Klotz
1988	La Maison assassinée	Marie Dormeur	Georges Lautner
1989	Tolérance	Tolerance	Pierre-Henry Salfati
1990	Cyrano de Bergerac	Roxane	Jean-Paul Rappeneau
1991	Tous les matins du monde	Madeleine	Alain Corneau
1992	Confessions d'un Barjo	Fanfan	Jérôme Boivin
1994	Du fond du cœur	Germaine de Stael	Jacques Doillon
1994	Consentement mutuel	Jeanne	Bernard Stora
1997	La Geôlière (aka Driftwood)	Sarah	Ronan O'Leary
1997	Une journée de merde	Martine	Miguel Courtois
2000	30 ans (aka 30 Years)	Jeanne	Laurent Perrin
2001	Dust	Lilith	Milcho Manchevski
2003	Le Bonheur ne tient qu'à un film	Sophie	Laurence Côte (court-métrage/ Short film)
2003	Histoire de Marie et Julien	Madame X	Jacques Rivette
2004	Confidences trop intimes	Perrine Beverel	Patrice Leconte
2004	The Hook	Lucie Kantor	Thomas Vincent
2004	La confiance règne	Jeanne	Étienne Chatiliez
2006	Les Irréductibles	Claire Deschamps	Renaud Bertrand
2006	A Year in My Life	Cécile	Daniel Duval
2007	My Very Best Friend (aka Un château en Espagne)	Emma Breal	Isabelle Doval
2008	Comme les autres	Cathy	Vincent Garenq
2009	The Hedgehog	Solange Josse	Mona Achache
2010	Sister Welsh's Nights	Sister Welsh / Catherine	Jean-Claude Janer
2010	The Round Up	Dina Traube	Roselyne Bosch
2011	La reine s'évade	Alice	Anne Brochet, (Short)
2014	If You Don't, I Will	Sonja	Sophie Fillières
2014	Les Gazelles	Gwen	Mona Achache
2014	Des lendemains qui chantent	Anne-Catherine	Nicolas Castro
Year	Television series	Role	Other notes
1986	Le Bal d'Irène	Irène	Jean-Louis Comolli (TV Series, 1 episode)
2000	La Chambre des magiciennes	Claire Weygand	Claude Miller, TV Movie
2004	Les Bottes	La mère de Caroline	Renaud Bertrand, TV Movie
2004	Coup de vache	Rachel	Lou Jeunet, TV Movie
2005	Nom de code : DP	Nathalie	Patrick Dewolf, TV Movie
2005	La Dérive des continents	Claire Moreau	Vincent Martorana, TV movie
2006	Poison d'avril	Laurence	William Karel, TV movie
2007	Voici venir l'orage...		Nina Companeez, (TV)
2008	Elena's Destiny, a Russian Saga	Sofia	(TV Mini-Series, 3 episodes)
2012	Inquisitio	Catherine de Sienne	(TV Series, 8 episodes)
2017	Mystery at the Place Vendôme	Rose	Renaud Bertrand, TV Movie
2017	Yours Sincerely, Lois Weber	Lois Weber	Svetlana Cvetko (Documentary short)
