= My Mother's Castle =

1957 novel by Marcel Pagnol

- First edition
- Author: Marcel Pagnol
- Original title: Le Château de ma mère
- Translator: Rita Barisse
- Language: French
- Series: Souvenirs d'enfance
- Genre: Autobiographical novel
- Publisher: Pastorelly
- Publication date: 1957
- Publication place: France

My Mother's Castle (French: Le Château de ma mère, pronounced [lə ʃato də ma mɛʁ]) is a 1957 autobiographical novel by Marcel Pagnol, the second in the four-volume series Souvenirs d'enfance and the sequel to My Father's Glory. It was the subject of a film made by Yves Robert in 1990 which is faithful to the original plot but which includes material from the third book in the four-novel series, Le Temps des Secrets.

== Plot summary ==
The book begins during Marcel's summer holiday. He describes his almost daily hunting trips with his father Joseph and his uncle Jules, and his growing friendship with a country boy named Lili. On the night before he is to return to the city to begin school, he plans to run away with the help of Lili. He leaves a note for his family saying goodbye and climbs through the window. As the night goes on, Marcel begins to grow scared, even seeing a ghost and changes his mind and returns before he is discovered (although it implied that his father had discovered the letter through a few jokes he makes). When he returns to the city, he is under extreme scholarly pressure due to his candidacy for a prestigious scholarship. He longs to return to the countryside and his wish is granted when they return for the Christmas holiday, much to Marcel's delight. Although only a few kilometers outside Marseilles the journey to the holiday home is time-consuming as public transport takes them a short portion of the way and the rest is a walk along an 8 km, winding road carrying all their possessions.

After the Christmas holiday, the family expresses desire to return more often to the countryside, but Joseph does not see the logic in leaving the city on a Saturday to get to the countryside in the late afternoon or evening and then return on Sunday. Later Marcel's mother takes it upon herself to befriend the headmistress and convinces her to give Joseph's Monday morning duties to another teacher, allowing the family to stay at the villa until Monday morning. Soon they begin to go almost every weekend.

One day, when travelling to their house, the family encounters one of Marcel's father's former pupils, Bouzigue, who now works in maintaining a canal which runs from the hills into Marseilles. The canal runs across private estates and so he is issued with a key which allows him to pass through several locked doors along the towpath. The employee points out to the family that this is a shortcut which will allow them to reach their house in a fraction of the journey time and offers them his spare key. Marcel's father, being honest and upright realizes that this would amount to trespassing, but while passing through the canals, Joseph is able to spot construction issues that Bouzigue himself did not. He is then convinced, by Bouzigue and himself, that he would even be doing a service to the people. He nevertheless accepts the key.

Despite his reservations, the family use the key more and more and the reduced journey time allows them to visit the holiday home every weekend. Joseph even begins to record his observations in a small notebook. They still have an apprehension each time they unlock a door fearing they will be caught. As time passes, however, they encounter the owner of one property and the groundsman of another, who are friendly and quite happy that they cross their land.

At the beginning of the summer holidays they make the journey again and Marcel's mother feels a great fear and trepidation of meeting the owner. When they reach the final door they discover it has been padlocked. They are confronted by the caretaker of the final property and his dog who has been watching them for some time and who decides to make an official report. He forces the family to open up all of their belongings, humiliating them, then seizes Joseph's notebook and terrifying Marcel's mother and little sister.

Marcel's father is devastated, believing a complaint could damage his career prospects and he could possibly lose his job as a school teacher. Bouzigue and two other employees of the canal however, confront the caretaker threatening him with prosecution for having unlawfully padlocked one of the company's doors. Bouzigue reveals to the family that the man is not a nobleman, but made his fortune from cattle. He and his fellow employees seize the report and destroy it.

The book jumps forward five years to a fifteen year old Marcel at his mother's funeral. It also tells of Lili and Paul (Marcel's younger brother): Paul was a goatherd in the countryside of Provence, until his sudden death at the age of 30. Lili is killed in 1917, during the First World War. Marcel is the only one left of their childhood company, now a successful film director. His company has purchased a large old house in the Marseilles area to turn into a film studio. When walking through the grounds he sees a familiar door and realizes that this is the last property on his childhood journey to his holiday home. In a burst of rage he picks up a rock and smashes the door, "ending a bad spell"; but under a bush of roses, he sees his mother trembling "on the other side of time, [...] forever unaware that she is home with her son."
