= My Father's Glory =

1957 novel by Marcel Pagnol

- First edition
- Author: Marcel Pagnol
- Original title: La Gloire de Mon Père
- Language: French
- Series: Souvenirs d'enfance
- Genre: Autobiographical novel
- Publisher: Pastorelly
- Publication date: 1957
- Publication place: France
- Media type: Print (Hardback & Paperback)

My Father's Glory (French: La Gloire de mon père, pronounced [la ɡlwaʁ də mɔ̃ pɛʁ]) is a 1957 autobiographical novel by Marcel Pagnol. Its sequel is My Mother's Castle. It is the first of four volumes in Pagnol's Souvenirs d'enfance series. There is also a 1990 film based on the novel, which is directed by Yves Robert.

== Plot summary ==
A poetic novel about his family and early years rather than a literal autobiography, Pagnol opens with the stories of his two parents, Joseph and Augustine, and his arrival in 1895 as their first child in the little town of Aubagne among the mountains of Provence. A school teacher there, the fiercely secular and socialist Joseph then gets a better job in the bustling city of Marseille. There his mother's sister Rose is courted by the fiercely conservative and Catholic Jules, who marries her. Despite striking many sparks off each other, the two brothers-in-law overall enjoy each other's company. So much so that in 1904 they agreed to rent a remote farmhouse outside the village of La Treille, where the two families can spend their summer together and get back to the simple pleasures of rural life. After a long struggle up mountain tracks, with their belongings on a mule, they reach what for young Marcel is an earthly paradise. He falls instantly in love with the wild landscape, its distinctive vegetation, and its abundant wildlife.

While he and his little brother Paul spend their days in happy play among the hills, his father and uncle have a weightier business. It will soon be the opening of the shooting season and, now they are proper countrymen rather than city intellectuals, they must be out with shotguns in search of game. As Joseph has never fired a gun in his life, Jules has all the pleasure of teaching the ignorant teacher the mysteries of this craft. In addition to learning how to use the weapon, Joseph has to learn how to bring down all the different sorts of game, above all the most legendarily difficult and rewarding local bird. This is the rock partridge, of which few men have hit more than a couple of tail feathers. On the great day, the two set off and young Marcel disobeys them by following, for he is terribly worried that his shy spectacle-wearing father will be humiliated by the loud know-all uncle. Trying to keep out of sight, the boy gets lost in the uninhabited mountains, until after several hours he hears two shots in quick succession. Out of the sky near his feet fall two rock partridges. His father got them, his only kill of the day, by firing both barrels. Next day, Joseph volunteers to go down to the village for the shopping and ties the two carcasses to his belt. The whole community is lost in admiration for his unparallelled feat and the priest is so impressed that he overcomes Joseph's atheist scruples by rushing home for a camera to record this historic moment.
