= List of films set in Marseille =

Marseille has been the setting for many films, produced mostly in France or Hollywood.

== Before 1950 ==
- Barrabas (1920)
- Cœur fidèle (1923)
- Monte Cristo (1929)
- Marius (1931)
- Fanny (1932)
- Justin de Marseille (1935)
- César (1936)
- Passage to Marseille (1944)
- Inspecteur Sergil (1947)
- Sergil et le dictateur (1948)

== 1950–1959 ==
- Sergil chez les filles (1952)
- House on the Waterfront (1954)
- Mémoire d’un flic (1955)
- Le Couteau sous la gorge (1955)
- Honoré de Marseille (1956)
- Seven Thunders (1957)

== 1960–1979 ==
- Fanny (1961)
- Je vous salue, mafia! (1965)
- Requiem pour une canaille (1967)
- L'armée des ombres (1969)
- Borsalino (1970)
- The French Connection (1971)
- Borsalino & Co. (1974)
- The Marseille Contract (1974)
- French Connection II (1975)

== 1980–1999 ==
- Le Bar du téléphone (1980)
- La Lune dans le caniveau (1983)
- Le Marginal (1983)
- The Judge (1984)
- 37°2 le matin (1986)
- Trois places pour le 26 (1988)
- Roselyne and the Lions (1989)
- My Father's Glory (1990)
- My Mother's Castle (1990)
- Le Petit Criminel (1990)
- Mayrig (1991)
- Un, deux, trois, soleil (1993)
- Bye-Bye (1995)
- Marius et Jeannette (1997)
- Taxi (1998)

== 2000 onwards ==
- Across the Sea (2024)
- Baise-moi (2000)
- Comme un aimant (2000)
- Taxi 2 (2000)
- Total Khéops (2001)
- The Bourne Identity (2002)
- Count of Monte Cristo (2002)
- The Transporter (2002)
- Gomez et Tavarès (2003)
- Love Actually (2003)
- Taxi 3 (2003)
- Lila Says (2004)
- Plus belle la vie (TV - 2004-2009)
- Taxi 4 (2006)
- MR 73 (2008)
- Traitor (2008)
- The Transporter 3 (2008)
- A Prophet (2009)
- Manmadhan Ambu (Tamil) (2010)
- Twiggy (2011)
- The Snows of Kilimanjaro (2011 film)
- Fanny (2013)
- Marius (2013)
- The Connection (2014)
- Marseille (2015)
- In Memoriam (2015)
- Marseille (2016)
- Transit (2018)
- Taxi 5 (2018)
- Stillwater (2021)
- BAC Nord (2021)
