= Fanny (play) =

1931 play

- Written by: Marcel Pagnol
- Original language: French
- Genre: Drama
- Setting: Marseille, France

Premiere
- Date premiered: 1931

Fanny is a 1931 play by the French writer Marcel Pagnol. It is the sequel to the 1929 play Marius and the second part in Pagnol's Marseille trilogy, which concludes with the 1936 play César.

== Adaptations ==
The work has been adapted to the screen numerous times including a 1932 French version directed by Marc Allégret and adapted by Pagnol himself, a 1933 Italian version, the 1934 German film The Black Whale and the 1938 American film Port of Seven Seas directed by James Whale. In 1954 it was turned into a stage musical Fanny which was itself adapted into a film Fanny in 1961. In 2013 Daniel Auteuil directed a remake Fanny of the original film.

== Cast recording ==
An audio cast recording of select scenes, with minor rewritings, was made at the studios Pelouze in Paris on 2 and 14 December 1933 for the French subsidiary of Columbia Records by the main cast (Pierre Fresnay, Orane Demazis, Raimu, Fernand Charpin, Paul Dullac, Henri Vilbert), except for M. Brun, who was played by Auguste Mouriès, who had replaced Dullac as Escartefigue in the film adaptation. It was later re-issued on compact disc.

No.	Title	Length
1.	"C’est ça, parle, César, parle" (There You Go, Speak, César, Speak)	06:07
2.	"Les lettres" (The Letters)	06:30
3.	"Le bateau de M. Brun" (Monsieur Brun’s Boat)	05:51
4.	"Le retour de Marius" (Marius’s Return)	06:32

== Bibliography ==
- Goble, Alan. The Complete Index to Literary Sources in Film. Walter de Gruyter, 1999.
