= The Golden Anchor =

1932 film

- Directed by: Alexander Korda
- Written by: Alfred Polgar; Lajos Bíró
- Based on: Marius by Marcel Pagnol
- Starring: Albert Bassermann; Ursula Grabley; Mathias Wieman
- Production company: Les Films Marcel Pagnol
- Distributed by: Paramount-Film
- Release date: 28 January 1932
- Running time: 82 minutes
- Countries: France; Germany
- Language: German

The Golden Anchor (German: Zum goldenen Anker) is a 1932 German-French drama film directed by Alexander Korda and starring Albert Bassermann, Ursula Grabley, and Mathias Wieman. It is the German-language version of the French film Marius (1931), also directed by Korda, and based on Marcel Pagnol's 1929 play of the same title and the first part of his Marseille trilogy. A separate Swedish-language version, titled Longing for the Sea and directed by John W. Brunius, was also released in 1931. Such multi-language versions were common during the early years of sound. It was made at the Joinville Studios by the European branch of Paramount Pictures.

== Cast ==
- Albert Bassermann as Piquoiseau
- Ursula Grabley as Fanny, ihre Tochter
- Mathias Wieman as Marcus sein Sohn
- Jakob Tiedtke as Cesar
- Lucie Höflich as Honorine
- Karl Etlinger as Panisse
- Ludwig Stössel as Escartefigue
- Rolf Müller as Heozer
- Karl Platen
- Jaro Fürth

== See also ==
- The Black Whale (1934) - A German version of the French sequel Fanny but not a sequel of The Golden Anchor.

== Bibliography ==
- Waldman, Harry (2000). Missing Reels: Lost Films of American and European Cinema. Jefferson, NC: McFarland. ISBN 978-0-7864-0724-8.
