= Port of Seven Seas =

1938 film by James Whale

- theatrical poster
- Directed by: James Whale
- Written by: Preston Sturges
- Based on: Fanny; 1931 play by Marcel Pagnol
- Produced by: Henry Henigson
- Starring: Wallace Beery; Frank Morgan; Maureen O'Sullivan
- Cinematography: Karl Freund
- Edited by: Frederick Y. Smith
- Music by: Franz Waxman
- Production company: Metro-Goldwyn-Mayer
- Distributed by: Loew's Inc.
- Release date: July 1, 1938
- Running time: 81 minutes
- Country: United States
- Language: English

Port of Seven Seas is a 1938 American drama film starring Wallace Beery and featuring Frank Morgan and Maureen O'Sullivan. The movie was written by Preston Sturges based on the plays of Marcel Pagnol and the films based on them, and was directed by James Whale, the director of Frankenstein (1931) and The Invisible Man (1933). The cinematography is by Karl Freund, who filmed Fritz Lang's Metropolis (1927) and I Love Lucy (1951-1957).

== Plot ==
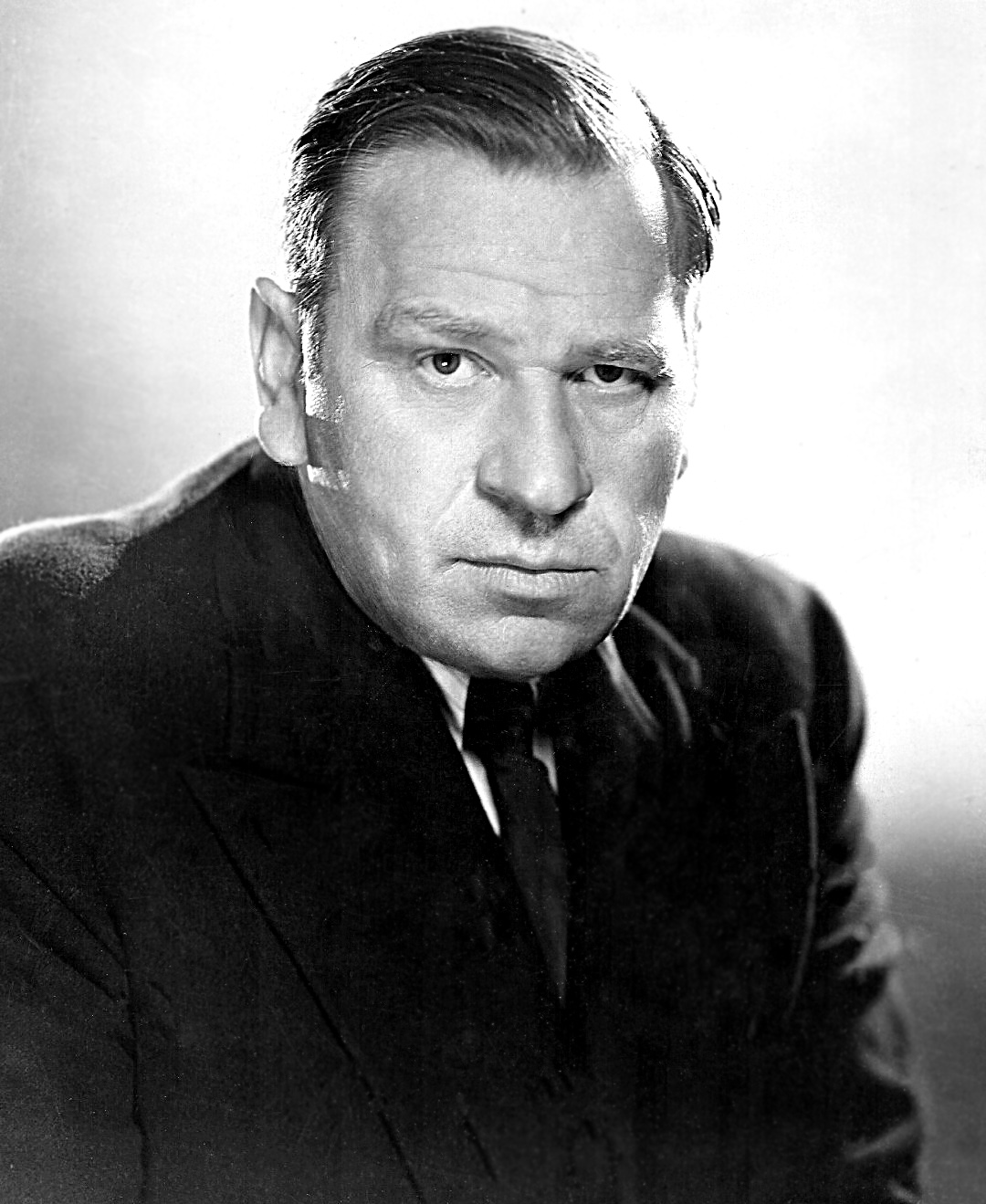
Wallace Beery as Honore

Honore Panisse is a wealthy sailmaker in his fifties who lives in Marseilles, France. He is infatuated with Madelon, the young daughter of a widowed fishmonger. However, she is in love with the sailor Marius, the son of Cesar the tavern-owner. Honore and Cesar are best friends.

For many years, Honore has played cards with his friends, Bruneau, Captain Escartefigue and Cesar. Honore and Cesar argue constantly, especially over Honore's infatuation with Madelon. Cesar adores her, considering her part of his family. One day, Madelon receives a note from Marius saying that he is shipping out for the next three years. He sent a note because he could not bear saying goodbye to her in person. Madelon rushes to the docks, then faints on seeing that the ship is sailing away.

Just arriving at the dock, Honore sees Madelon faint. He is ready to carry her home, but Cesar insists on taking her himself. He does not know yet that his son is gone. Honore tries to tell him why Madelon fainted, but cannot. He listens fretfully as Cesar tells him that Marius and Madelon will soon marry. When Cesar tells his wife Honorine about what happened at the docks, Madelon tells them that Marius has gone for three years.

A month passes without any letters from Marius. A letter finally arrives from him. As Cesar reads the letter aloud, there is scant mention of Madelon, making her sad. Soon Honore goes to Honorine to ask to marry Madelon. At the same time, Madelon finds out that she is pregnant and prays that she will have the strength to tell Honorine.

Madelon later goes to Honore and says she cannot marry him because she is pregnant. However, the revelation makes him happy because he always wanted a child. Because Honore is so kind, Madelon agrees to marry him for the sake of the baby. When Cesar arrives, she quells his anger by telling him the truth. Cesar finally relents in his anger at Honore for "stealing" his grandchild when he says that Cesar will be godfather. They all agree to call the boy Cesar Marius Panisse. After the baby Cesar is born, Honore adores him.

One year later, Honore boards a train one day to Paris on business. That same day, Marius unexpectedly shows up at Cesar's house; he returned to Marseilles to buy some equipment for his ship. During the night, Marius goes to see Madelon, knowing that she has married Honore. She lies to Marius, saying that her husband is asleep in the bedroom. Marius confesses to Madelon how much he has missed her, but she tells him it's too late. When little Cesar cries, she goes to him and Marius realizes that the child is his. When Madelon tearfully confesses that Honore is actually in Paris, Marius asks her to come away with him She tells him to go away.

At this moment, Honore unexpectedly enters the house. He had encountered the town doctor on the train to Paris and learned that a neighbor's child had contracted scarlet fever. Worried about baby Cesar, he immediately took a train back to Marseilles. Soon Cesar and the three of them start arguing. Marius refuses to leave without Madelon and the baby. Though Honore sadly says that Madelon can have her freedom, he adds that he cannot give up the baby. When the baby starts crying, Honore goes to the nursery to check on him. In the meantime, Madelon and Cesar have a serious talk with Marius. They convince him that the baby belongs as much to Horore as to Marius or Madelon. When Honore comes back in the room with the baby, Marius shakes his hand and leaves the house. Honore and Madelon happily look at their baby's first tooth.

== Cast ==
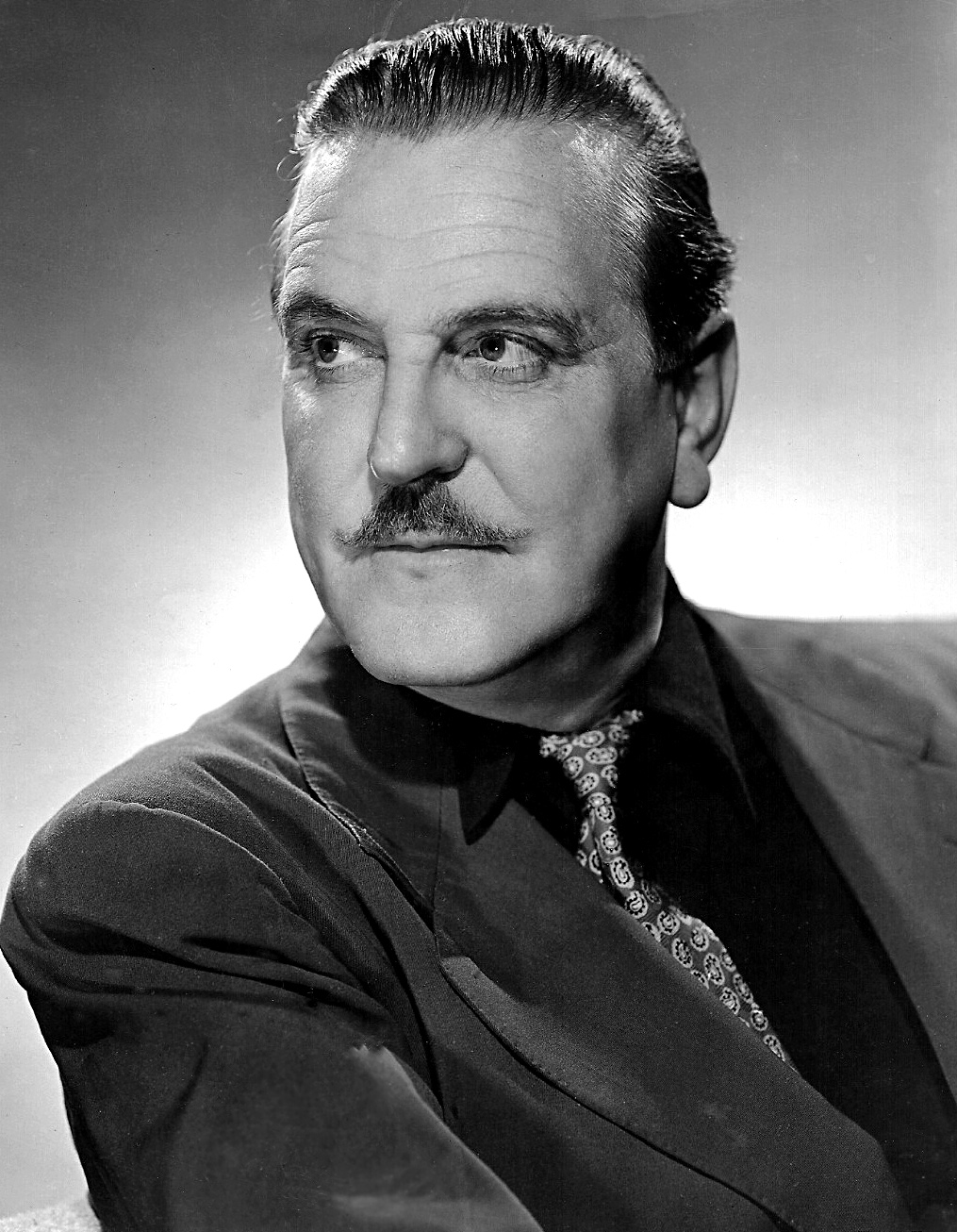
Frank Morgan as Cesar

- Wallace Beery as Cesar
- Frank Morgan as Panisse
- Maureen O'Sullivan as Madelon
- John Beal as Marius
- Jessie Ralph as Honorine
- Cora Witherspoon as Claudine
- Etienne Girardot as Bruneau
- E. Alyn Warren as Captain Escartefigue
- Jerry Colonna as Arab Rug Dealer (uncredited)
- Henry Hull as Uncle Alzear (uncredited)
- Doris Lloyd as Customer (uncredited)
- Fred Malatesta as Bird Seller (uncredited)
- Robert Spindola as Boy (uncredited)

== Production ==
Marcel Pagnol, whose plays and films were the source material for Port of Seven Seas

Although the credited basis of Port of Seven Seas was Marcel Pagnol's 1931 play Fanny, the screenplay incorporated some incidents from three French films written by Pagnol based on his plays: Marius (1931), directed by Alexander Korda, Fanny (1932), directed by Marc Allégret, and César (1936), which Pagnol directed. The play "Marius" was a great success and was played more than one thousand times in Paris.

William Wyler was slated to direct the film at the time that Preston Sturges was brought into the project. The working titles for the film were "Fanny", "Madelon", "Life on the Waterfront" and "Man of the Waterfront". Ernest Vajda had been reported to be one of the screenwriters, but was not credited. The project was considered by Universal Studios in late 1933 or early 1934, they dropped it after Joseph Breen, who supervised the Production Code, rejected the submitted script. Paramount Pictures had some interest in it, before the script ended up at MGM by July 1936. Although the MGM script was still essentially the same one that Universal had submitted to the Hays Office, this time the censors found it "acceptable", and it was approved on 15 March 1938. This did not prevent the Legion of Decency from protesting that the film "lower[ed] the standards" that the Production Code was designed to uphold.

Port of Seven Seas was in production from late December 1937 through 28 January 1938, with retakes completed on 23 February. Shortly before production started, Luise Rainer, who was to have played "Madelon" was replaced by Maureen O'Sullivan because of a bad cold.

The film was released on 1 July 1938, the long delay coming about because the studio considered the subject matter "dangerous" for the film industry while Congress was considering legislation which had implications for film censorship.

The movie was premiered on July 1, 1938 in New York City. Marcel Pagnol and Raimu (the great French actor who played Cesar in the French plays and movies) were invited but did not come, supposedly for fear of air travel. The movie was premiered in France in Marseille, later in 1938, at the movie theatre "Le Noailles" with Wallace Beery, Marcel Pagnol and Raimu in attendance.

== Other versions ==
Pagnol's plays provided source material for the three French films noted above, a 1933 Italian film named Fanny, the 1934 German film Der Schwarze Walfisch ("The Black Whale"), the 1954 Broadway musical Fanny, and the 1961 non-musical film based in part on it. Even though many situations and incidents in the 1961 film originated in Port of the Seven Seas, neither it nor Preston Sturges was credited.
