= Heartbeat (1938 film) =

- Directed by: Marcel Pagnol
- Written by: Marcel Pagnol
- Produced by: Marcel Pagnol
- Starring: Fernandel; Orane Demazis; Fernand Charpin
- Cinematography: Willy Faktorovitch
- Edited by: Suzanne Cabon; Suzanne de Troeye
- Music by: Casimir Oberfeld
- Production company: Les Films Marcel Pagnol
- Release date: 15 April 1938
- Running time: 160 minutes
- Country: France
- Language: French

Heartbeat (French: Le schpountz) is a 1938 French comedy film directed by Marcel Pagnol and starring Fernandel, Orane Demazis and Fernand Charpin. It was remade in 1999 as Le schpountz, directed by Gérard Oury.

It tells the story of an unhappy young grocer's assistant who dreams of becoming a grand dramatic actor, but when he gatecrashes a film studio they realise he is a natural comic.

== Plot ==
Irénée lives and works in the little grocery shop of his childless uncle, who brought him up, and dreams of becoming a famous and rich film actor with an exotic car. One day a film crew stops in the village and he attempts to interest them in his undiscovered talents. They play along with his obsession, calling him the village idiot or schpountz, and even give him a fake contract. His uncle ridicules his naïvety and the sympathetic Françoise, a member of the team, warns him not to take it seriously. But Irénée withdraws his savings and, taking a train to Paris, arrives at the studio, from which he is repeatedly thrown out. Taking pity on him, Françoise gets him a job as a props assistant.

However the jokers who first ensnared him then use him in another trick to ruin the take of a pompous actor, Galubert, under an even more pompous director. Sending him on to the set results in chaos, but some realise that he is actually funny rather than pitiable and he is given a part. The film is a success, with the public preferring the comedy of Irénée to the grandeur of Galubert. The head of the studio gives him a real contract, which he will not sign until he also gets a Peugeot 601 Éclipse convertible, and on the strength of this he proposes to Françoise. Once married, the two drive down to his uncle's village, where he enters the shop alone in the clothes in which he left, telling his uncle that his dream of fame has proved false and asking to come home again. The uncle is delighted to be proved right, and Irénée then brings in his wife. The uncle is delighted to have someone else to work in the shop, until Irénée tells him to look at the car outside and so reveals the truth.

== Cast ==
- Fernandel as Irénée Fabre, 'le Schpountz'
- Orane Demazis as Françoise
- Fernand Charpin as L'oncle Baptiste Fabre (as Charpin)
- Léon Belières as Meyerboom
- Enrico Glori as Bodigar Glazunoff
- Robert Vattier as Astruc
- Marcel Maupi as Le barman
- Louisard as Charlet
- Henri Poupon as Galubert
- Robert Bassac as Dromart
- Charles Blavette as Martelette
- Jean Castan as Casimir Fabre
- André Pollack as L'avoué
- Charblay as Adolphe, le portier du studio
- Tyrand as Le pape
- Jacques B. Brunius as L'accessoiriste
- Henri Champetier as Nick
- Roger Forster as Lucien
- Beretta as Le chef de plateau
- Jean Weber as Le cantinier
- Alida Rouffe as Grocery Customer
- Alice Robert as Rita Camelia
- Odette Roger as La tante Clarisse Fabre
- Pierre Brasseur as Cousine
- Robert Darène as Un aide
- Louis Ducreux
- Geo Forster as Cousine II
- André Roussin as Roussin

== Bibliography ==
- Rémi Fournier Lanzoni. French Comedy on Screen: A Cinematic History. Palgrave Macmillan, 2014.
