= Marius (play) =

Play written by the French writer Marcel Pagnol

- Written by: Marcel Pagnol
- Original language: French
- Genre: Drama
- Setting: Marseille, France

Premiere
- Date premiered: 1929

Marius is a 1929 play by the French writer Marcel Pagnol. It takes place in Marseille, where a young man named Marius working in a café dreams of going to sea, his obsession eventually overcoming his developing romance with Fanny, a local girl who is his childhood friend.

In 1930 an American adaptation by Sidney Howard, Marseilles, was staged on Broadway. One year later a British version Sea Fever by John Van Druten was staged unsuccessfully in the West End. The same year Pagnol wrote a sequel, Fanny.

== Film adaptation ==
In 1931 the play was turned into a film Marius directed by Alexander Korda for the French subsidiary of Paramount Pictures with a screenplay written by Pagnol himself. The Golden Anchor (German: Zum goldenen Anker), a 1932 film by Alexander Korda, is the German-language version of the 1931 film Marius. In 1938 this was remade as an American film Port of Seven Seas by James Whale. In 2013 it was remade by Daniel Auteuil.

== Cast recording ==
An audio cast recording of select scenes, with minor rewritings, was made at the studios Pelouze in Paris in March 1932 and on 2 and 14 December 1933 for Columbia Records by the main cast (Pierre Fresnay, Orane Demazis, Raimu, Fernand Charpin, Paul Dullac, Robert Vattier, Henri Vilbert). It was later re-issued on compact disc.

No.	Title	Length
1.	"La leçon de bistrot" (The Bartending Lesson)	03:11
2.	"Le retour de M. Brun" (Monsieur Brun’s Return)	03:15
3.	"Je sors" (I’m Going Out)	02:58
4.	"Pauvre Félicité" (Poor Félicité)	03:13
5.	"Je t’aime bien, Papa" (I Like You Very Much, Papa)	06:33
6.	"La partie de cartes" (The Card Game)	06:11
7.	"Le petit déjeuner et l’histoire de Zoé" (The Breakfast and Zoé’s Story)	05:57

== Bibliography ==
- Goble, Alan. The Complete Index to Literary Sources in Film. Walter de Gruyter, 1999.
- Wearing, J.P. The London Stage 1930-1939: A Calendar of Productions, Performers, and Personnel. Rowman & Littlefield, 2014.
