= Fanny (1961 film) =

1961 film by Joshua Logan

- Theatrical release poster
- Directed by: Joshua Logan
- Screenplay by: Julius J. Epstein
- Based on: Fanny 1954 musical by; S. N. Behrman; Joshua Logan; Harold Rome; Fanny 1929 play by Marcel Pagnol
- Produced by: Ben Kadish
- Starring: Leslie Caron; Maurice Chevalier; Charles Boyer; Horst Buchholz
- Cinematography: Jack Cardiff
- Edited by: William Reynolds
- Music by: Harold Rome; Morris Stoloff; Harry Sukman (uncredited)
- Production company: Mansfield Productions
- Distributed by: Warner Bros.
- Release date: June 28, 1961 (United States)
- Running time: 134 minutes
- Country: United States
- Language: English
- Box office: $4.5 million (US/Canada rentals)

Fanny is a 1961 American Technicolor romantic drama film directed by Joshua Logan. The screenplay by Julius J. Epstein is based on the book for the 1954 stage musical of the same title by Logan and S.N. Behrman, which in turn had been adapted from Marcel Pagnol's trilogy. Pagnol wrote two plays, Marius (1929) and Fanny (1931) and completed the trilogy by writing and directing a film, César, in 1936. Previously, Marius (1931) and Fanny (1932) had also been produced as films.

The film deleted all the songs from Fanny, the stage musical, but the music by Harold Rome served as the underscore for the soundtrack, and the title tune is used as the main title theme. It was nominated for both the Academy Award and the Golden Globe Award for Best Original Score.

== Plot ==
César is a barkeeper in Marseille in the early 1920s. His 18-year-old son, Marius, who works for him at his bar, is obsessed with going to sea, leaving his boring existence behind. The only thing holding him back is Fanny, an 18-year-old girl with whom he grew up, who works selling fish with her mother down at the waterfront. Fanny has been in love with Marius her whole life. She flirts with him, but while he is attracted, Marius always rejects her.

Fanny invites Marius to a Sunday-night dance, but he rejects her once more. Unbeknownst to Fanny, Marius is planning to leave the next day. Encouraged by his friend, the “Admiral”, he has secretly signed on as a sailor on a round-the-world scientific expedition. Offended by his rejection, Fanny leaves.

Meanwhile, Panisse, an older merchant and a widower, asks to meet with Fanny's mother Honorine, who believes he wants to propose to her. To Honorine's surprise, Panisse wants to marry Fanny, even though he knows she loves someone else. Although disappointed, Honorine does not object: Panisse is worth 600,000 francs.

Fanny tells Marius that she has rejected Panisse's proposal because she loves him and is willing to wait until he returns. Marius tells her he will be away for five years and to forget about him. They declare their love for each other and go to Fanny's house, where they sleep together.

The following morning, Honorine discovers Fanny and Marius in bed together. She and César begin to plan their children's wedding, but Fanny urges Marius to leave and follow his heart. She lies to him, telling him that she would rather marry a rich man like Panisse than him. In truth, she is afraid that, eventually, he will grow to hate her for depriving him of this great opportunity.

About two months after Marius goes off to sea, Fanny discovers she is pregnant with his child. She tells Panisse, who is happy to marry her anyway, overjoyed by the possibility of an heir to carry on his name. They marry, and Fanny gives birth to a boy. César, knowing the baby's true father, collaborates with Panisse to give the baby the name Césario Marius Panisse.

On Césario's first birthday, Panisse takes the train to Paris on business. While he is gone, Marius returns, on short leave. He visits Fanny, and upon discerning her child is his, apologizes to Fanny. He knows now that she enabled him to follow his passion for the sea. Marius tells her that he wants her back, but César comes in before anything can happen. Panisse arrives home early. Knowing that Fanny will not leave without the boy, he says that he will not try to stop Fanny from going with Marius, but he will not part with the child. Fanny tells Marius she loves him, but she will not take Césario from Panisse. Marius leaves without Fanny or his child.

Ten years later, Césario is looking forward to his birthday party. After being taken to the waterfront, Césario wanders off and meets the Admiral. The Admiral takes the boy sailing without telling anyone and reunites him with Marius, though Césario has no idea who Marius is. Marius, who is now working in a garage, is overjoyed to see his son, but when Panisse is told the boy is missing, he is stricken and taken to his room. Fanny is shocked to find Césario with his father. She announces that Panisse is dying, and Marius drives them home.

When they arrive at the house, Panisse calls for Césario to sit with him. Fanny goes outside and talks with Cesar and Marius. Marius expresses his bitterness and announces his plans to leave for the United States the next day. Fanny explains to Marius that she never told him about the baby because on the day he left, she hoped he would turn around and not get on the boat. When he did not, she felt betrayed and angry. Fanny goes to Panisse. On his deathbed, Panisse dictates a letter asking Marius to marry Fanny and be a father to Césario. His only request is that the boy keep the last name, Panisse.

== Cast ==
- Leslie Caron as Fanny
- Horst Buchholz as Marius
- Charles Boyer as César (Marius' father)
- Maurice Chevalier as Panisse (César's friend, who loves Fanny)
- Georgette Anys as Honorine (Fanny's mother)
- Salvatore Baccaloni as Escartefigue (César's friend & a ferry boat captain)
- Lionel Jeffries as Monsieur Brun (the Englishman)
- Raymond Bussieres as The Admiral (Marius' friend)
- Joel Flateau as Césario

== Production ==
Several versions of the Pagnol works had been filmed prior to this adaptation. The original film trilogy in French was directed by Alexander Korda (Marius, 1931), Marc Allégret (Fanny, 1932) and Pagnol himself (César, 1936). There was a 1933 Italian film named Fanny, the 1934 German film Der Schwarze Walfisch ("The Black Whale"), and Port of Seven Seas, a 1938 American film directed by James Whale, also based on the trilogy.

Jack L. Warner purchased the screen rights to the stage musical, but believing that the popularity of musical films was on the wane, he decided to eliminate the songs. West Side Story, released the same year as Fanny, proved to be a box office success. The production did benefit significantly from the decision: Charles Boyer, who had refused the role when it involved singing because he would neither sing nor allow his voice to be dubbed, gladly accepted when that was no longer necessary. Boyer and Chevalier, who were old friends, were delighted to be able to work together, at last.

Before the picture's release, art house theater owners booked the original films, promoting the showings as the last opportunity to see them before the new picture came out. In fact, Warner's acquisition of the screen rights removed the films from circulation for decades.

Plans for the original title, Joshua Logan's Fanny, were scrapped when reporters pointed out the double meaning.

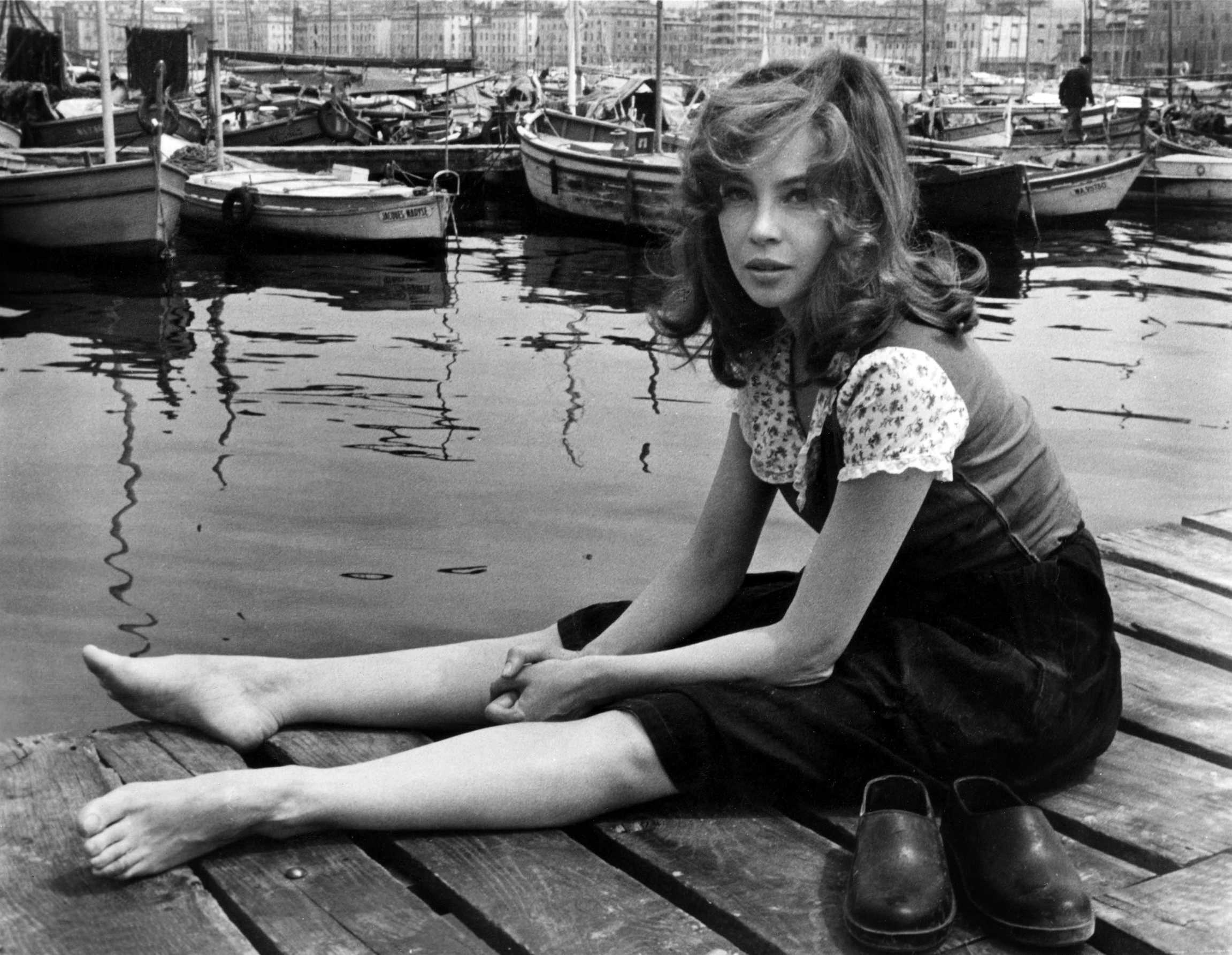
Leslie Caron during a break in filming Fanny, at the Vieux Port of Marseille

Screenwriter Julius J. Epstein had collaborated with Joshua Logan on Tall Story the previous year, but he initially declined the director's offer to adapt Fanny for the screen, because he found it difficult to believe Marius' motivation for leaving Marseille. He accepted the assignment after Logan found a solution in Marius' relationship with his father. Epstein relied on Pagnol's plays for inspiration, but retained the ending of the musical, which was quite different from the plot of Pagnol's original film, César. Some scenes and dialogue are taken directly from the 1938 film.

Audrey Hepburn agreed to portray Fanny but eventually had to decline the role due to prior commitments. Assuming the French would dislike an English language interpretation of the Pagnol plays, Leslie Caron was hesitant to replace her, but she liked the script and accepted three weeks before principal photography began.

Among the Marseille locations used for filming were Notre-Dame de la Garde and Vieux Port.

== Reception ==
=== Critical reception ===
Bosley Crowther of The New York Times observed, "Whether fan of the Pagnol films or stage show, whether partial to music or no, you can't help but derive joy from this picture if you have a sense of humor and a heart. For Mr. Logan, with the aid of expert craftsmen and a cast of principals that we do not believe an act of divine cooperation could have greatly improved upon, has given the charming Marseilles folk play a stunning pictorial sweep, a deliciously atmospheric flavor and a flesh-touching intimacy. And, embraced by these graphic, sensuous virtues are the rich human, comic elements that flowed out of Pagnol's little pictures and glimmered upon the Broadway stage . . . To be sure, there are flaws in the compound. The cutting is often too abrupt, some scenes are confused by intercutting, and the tempo in the early phases is much too fast. Also, occasionally the actors are costumed too prettily, and the domestic magnificence of the Panisses in the last part is tasteless and absurd . . . [But] on the whole, the appropriate atmosphere of Marseilles is literally and colorfully conveyed — in excellent color, by the way. Perhaps there will be some prim objection to the lush emotionalism of it all and to the frankness of the musical nudging, but we loved it."

=== Box office ===
Fanny was the highest-grossing film at Radio City Music Hall in New York City at the time, grossing $1,573,582 in nine weeks and was number one at the US box office for three weeks.

== Awards and nominations ==
Award	Category	Nominee(s)	Result
Academy Awards	Best Picture	Joshua Logan	Nominated
Academy Awards	Best Actor	Charles Boyer	Nominated
Academy Awards	Best Cinematography – Color	Jack Cardiff	Nominated
Academy Awards	Best Film Editing	William Reynolds	Nominated
Academy Awards	Best Music Score of a Dramatic or Comedy Picture	Morris Stoloff and Harry Sukman	Nominated
American Cinema Editors Awards	Best Edited Feature Film	William Reynolds	Nominated
Directors Guild of America Awards	Outstanding Directorial Achievement in Motion Pictures	Joshua Logan	Nominated
Golden Globe Awards	Best Motion Picture – Drama		Nominated
Golden Globe Awards	Best Actor in a Motion Picture – Drama	Maurice Chevalier	Nominated
Golden Globe Awards	Best Actress in a Motion Picture – Drama	Leslie Caron	Nominated
Golden Globe Awards	Best Original Score – Motion Picture	Harold Rome	Nominated
Laurel Awards	Top Drama		4th Place
Laurel Awards	Top Male Dramatic Performance	Charles Boyer	5th Place
Laurel Awards	Top Female Dramatic Performance	Leslie Caron	5th Place
Laurel Awards	Top Cinematography – Color	Daniel L. Fapp	Nominated
National Board of Review Awards	Top Ten Films		10th Place
Writers Guild of America Awards	Best Written American Drama	Julius J. Epstein	Nominated

== Home media ==
- Warner Home Video released the film on VHS on February 9, 1983, as part of their "A Night At the Movies" series, featuring a Hearst Metrotone Newsreel; the Warner Bros. animated short The Last Hungry Cat; and a trailer of films from 1961.
- Image Entertainment released the film on DVD on June 17, 2008.
- Shout Factory released the film on Blu-Ray on September 20, 2016.

== See also ==
- List of American films of 1961
- Fanny, the 1932 original film version
