= Longing for the Sea =

1931 film

- Directed by: John W. Brunius
- Written by: Gustaf Collijn
- Based on: Marius by Marcel Pagnol
- Produced by: Robert T. Kane
- Starring: Edvin Adolphson; Carl Barcklind; Inga Tidblad
- Cinematography: Enzo Riccioni
- Music by: Francis Gromon
- Production company: Les Studios Paramount
- Distributed by: Film AB Paramount
- Release date: 12 November 1931
- Running time: 101 minutes
- Countries: France; Sweden
- Language: Swedish

Longing for the Sea (Swedish: Längtan till havet) is a 1931 French-Swedish drama film directed by John W. Brunius and starring Edvin Adolphson, Carl Barcklind and Inga Tidblad. It is the Swedish-language version of the French film Marius directed by Alexander Korda and based on the 1929 play of the same title by Marcel Pagnol. It was shot at the Joinville Studios in Paris and on location in Marseille. The film's sets were designed by the art director Vincent Korda.

== Synopsis ==
Marius works in his father's cafe on the Marseille waterfront but dreams of going away to sea. He has a dalliance with Fanny. Marius receives an offer to work on a ship that is going on a voyage for many years. Torn between his love for Fanny and his seafaring dream, he refuses the opportunity. But Fanny, realizing he will not be truly happy staying at home, decides to encourage him to leave by letting him think that she would rather be with someone else. Ultimately Marius leaves her to take a job as a sailor on a ship sailing the world.

== Cast ==
- Edvin Adolphson as Marius
- Carl Barcklind as Marius's father
- Inga Tidblad as Fanny
- Karin Swanström as Fanny's mother
- Rune Carlsten as Panisse
- Nils Lundell as Piquoiseau
- Georg Blomstedt as Felix Escartefique
- John W. Brunius as Le Goelec
- Nils Jacobsson as Sailor
- Nils Wahlbom as Brun

== Bibliography ==
- Goble, Alan. The Complete Index to Literary Sources in Film. Walter de Gruyter, 1999.
- Sadoul, Georges. Dictionary of Film Makers. University of California Press, 1972.
