= Marseilles (play) =

1930 play by Sidney Howard

Marseilles is play in three acts by Sidney Howard that was adapted from Marcel Pagnol's Marius (1929). Produced and directed by Gilbert Miller, it premiered at Parsons Theatre in Hartford, Connecticut on November 3, 1930, with a cast led by Alexander Kirkland as Marius. It transferred to Broadway's Henry Miller's Theatre on November 17, 1930. It ran for 16 performances. Helene Pons designed the gowns worn by the women in the production. Others in the cast included Guy Kibbee as Panisse, Douglas Wood as Monsieur Brun, and Alison Skipworth as Honorine.
