= Fanny (1932 film) =

1932 film

- Directed by: Marc Allégret
- Written by: Marcel Pagnol
- Based on: Fanny a 1931 play by Marcel Pagnol
- Produced by: Roger Richebé; Marcel Pagnol
- Starring: Raimu; Pierre Fresnay; Orane Demazis; Fernand Charpin; Alida Rouffe; Auguste Mourriès
- Cinematography: Nicolas Toporkoff
- Edited by: Jean Mamy
- Music by: Vincent Scotto
- Distributed by: Mediterranean Film Company
- Release date: 28 October 1932 (France)
- Running time: 127 minutes
- Country: France
- Language: French

Fanny is a 1932 French romantic drama film directed by Marc Allégret and starring Raimu, Pierre Fresnay, Orane Demazis, Fernand Charpin, and Alida Rouffe. Based on the 1931 play of the same name by Marcel Pagnol, it is the second part of the Marseille Trilogy, which began with Marius (1931) and concluded with César (1936). The film was shot both at the Billancourt Studios in Paris and on location in Marseille, with sets designed by the art director Gabriel Scognamillo. Like Marius, Fanny was a box office success in France and is still considered a classic of French cinema.

== Plot ==
In Marseille, Marius, the son of barkeeper César, has had a romance with Fanny, his childhood friend and the daughter of the fish saleswoman in the harbor, before following his dream by taking a job on a boat going on a five-year scientific expedition. Shortly after Marius leaves, Fanny discovers she is pregnant with his child, so, to avoid bringing shame on her family, her mother encourages her to reverse her earlier refusal of the marriage proposal of Honoré Panisse, a wealthy middle-aged widower.

Fanny talks to Panisse about wishing to marry him and that she is with child, and she is surprised to find that he still wants to marry her, as he is excited by the prospect of finally having the child that he was unable to have with his first wife. César finds out about the pregnancy, but even he is convinced that it will be best for his grandchild to be raised as Panisse's child. The wedding takes place, and Fanny gives birth to a baby boy, named Césariot after César (who is also made the boy's godfather). They say the baby was born prematurely, and, although this does not fool anyone, everyone is willing to act as though they believe it.

Several months later, Marius surprises César by showing up at the bar one night—there are issues with the boat he was on, and he has volunteered to bring some scientific instruments back to Paris for retooling while the ship is repaired. Soon suspecting Césariot is his son, Marius goes to try to win back Fanny. He says he is homesick and offers to stay in Marseille, and he has almost succeeded in getting Fanny to leave Panisse when César arrives and convinces the couple that it will be best for Césariot to continue to be raised by Panisse, who is, after all, a kind and generous father. César takes a dejected Marius to catch his train to Paris, leaving Fanny in tears.

== Cast ==
- Raimu as César Ollivier
- Pierre Fresnay as Marius Ollivier
- Orane Demazis as Fanny Cabanis (later Panisse)
- Fernand Charpin as Honoré Panisse
- Auguste Mourriès as Félix Escartefique
- Robert Vattier as Albert Brun
- Marcel Maupi as Innocent Mangiapan
- Alida Rouffe as Honorine Cabanis
- Milly Mathis as Claudine Foulon, Fanny's aunt
- Odette Roger as Fortunette
- Louis Boulle as Elzéar Panisse, Honoré's older brother
- Édouard Delmont as Dr. Félicien Venelle (uncredited)

André Gide and Pierre Prévert make uncredited cameo appearances in the film.

== Cast recordings ==
An audio cast recording of select scenes, with minor rewrites, was made at the studios Pelouze in Paris on 2 and 14 December 1933 for Columbia Records by most of the main cast (Raimu, Fresnay, Demazis, Charpin) and Henri Vilbert; Escartefigue was played by Paul Dullac, who had played the role in Marius, and M. Brun was played by Auguste Mourriès, who had stood up for Dullac as Escartefigue in the film. It was later re-issued on compact disc.

No.	Title	Length
1.	"C’est ça, parle, César, parle" (There You Go, Speak, César, Speak)	06:07
2.	"Les lettres" (The Letters)	06:30
3.	"Le bateau de M. Brun" (Monsieur Brun’s Boat)	05:51
4.	"Le retour de Marius" (Marius’s Return)	06:32

In 1961, Pagnol’s distribution company, the Compagnie méditerranéenne de films, released the film soundtrack on disc, interspersed with narrative comments and descriptions spoken by Pagnol. In complement came a reading of Pagnol's preface to the play, which was written for the publication of his complete works and was later collected in the 1981 volume Confidences, and of recollections about the production of the film, which were later published as part of the augmented edition of his 1934 essay French: Cinématurgie de Paris. The album was re-issued on CD by Frémeaux & Associés, in their “Librairie sonore” series.

== In popular culture ==
- Alice Waters, the famed restaurateur and founder of California cuisine, was so taken by the Marseille Trilogy that she named her Berkeley restaurant "Chez Panisse". The café upstairs from the restaurant is decorated with posters from the films Marius, Fanny, and César.
- The main characters of the Marseille Trilogy make a cameo appearance in the Asterix comic book Asterix and the Banquet. The pétanque-playing scene in the comic book is a reference to a similar scene in Fanny.

== See also ==
- The Black Whale (1934) – a German film adaptation of Fanny starring Emil Jannings
- Port of Seven Seas (1938) – an American film based on both Marius and Fanny starring Wallace Beery and directed by James Whale
- Fanny (1961) – a non-musical American film based on the 1954 stage musical adaptation of the Marseille Trilogy
- Fanny (2013) – a French film adapted by, directed by, and starring Daniel Auteuil
