= Marius (1931 film) =

1931 film

- Directed by: Alexander Korda
- Written by: Marcel Pagnol
- Based on: Marius a 1929 play by Marcel Pagnol
- Produced by: Robert Kane; Marcel Pagnol
- Starring: Raimu; Pierre Fresnay; Orane Demazis; Fernand Charpin; Alida Rouffe; *Paul Dullac; Alexandre Mihalesco
- Cinematography: Theodore J. Pahle
- Edited by: Roger Mercanton
- Music by: Francis Gromon
- Distributed by: Les Films Paramount
- Release date: 10 October 1931
- Running time: 127 minutes
- Country: France
- Language: French

Marius is a 1931 French romantic drama film directed by Alexander Korda and starring Raimu, Pierre Fresnay, Orane Demazis, Fernand Charpin, and Alida Rouffe. Based on the 1929 play of the same name by Marcel Pagnol, it is the first part of the Marseille Trilogy, which also includes the films Fanny (1932) and César (1936). The film was made for the French subsidiary of Paramount Pictures. A separate Swedish-language version, titled Longing for the Sea and directed by John W. Brunius, was also released in 1931, and a German-language version, titled The Golden Anchor, also directed by Korda, was released the following year.

A restoration of the film was selected to be screened in the Cannes Classics section at the 2015 Cannes Film Festival. The restored film was also given a limited re-release in the United States by Janus Films on 4 January 2017, first premiering at the Film Forum in New York City.

== Plot ==
César has a waterfront bar in Marseille. His son, Marius, works for him, and Fanny, Marius' friend since childhood, sells cockles at a stall just outside the door. Marius loves Fanny, but he tries to hide his feelings because he secretly longs to travel to exotic places on one of the ships that depart from the nearby docks, and he does not want Fanny to have to live the life of the wife of a sailor.

Honoré Panisse, a wealthy middle-aged widower who is an old friend of César, proposes to Fanny, and Marius gets jealous. He tells Fanny about a job on a ship that he hopes to get, and Fanny admits her feelings for him. The job falls through, and Marius and Fanny secretly begin a relationship.

When Fanny's mother catches Marius and Fanny sleeping together, she talks with César about getting the pair married. It is understood that Marius and Fanny are engaged, but Marius receives an offer to work on a ship that is going on a five-year voyage. He refuses the opportunity because his love for Fanny would not permit him to leave her. But Fanny, realizing he will not be truly happy after abandoning his dream of a seafaring life, decides to encourage him to leave by letting him think that she would rather marry Panisse. When Marius has persuaded himself that Fanny prefers Panisse to him, he decides to sneak away to the boat. As Fanny listens to César talk about how he will rearrange the apartment above the bar for her and Marius to live there, she cannot take it any longer and faints.

== Cast ==
- Raimu as César Ollivier
- Pierre Fresnay as Marius Ollivier
- Orane Demazis as Fanny Cabanis
- Fernand Charpin as Honoré Panisse
- Alida Rouffe as Honorine Cabanis
- Paul Dullac as Félix Escartefique
- Alexandre Mihalesco as Piquoiseau
- Robert Vattier as Albert Brun
- Édouard Delmont as Le Goelec, who arranges crews for boats

== Cast recordings ==
An audio cast recording of select scenes, with minor rewrites, was made at the studios Pelouze in Paris in March 1932 and on 2 and 14 December 1933 for Columbia Records by the main cast (Raimu, Fresnay, Demazis, Charpin, Dullac, Vattier) and Henri Vilbert. It was later re-issued on compact disc.

No.	Title	Length
1.	"La leçon de bistrot" (The Bartending Lesson)	03:11
2.	"Le retour de M. Brun" (Monsieur Brun’s Return)	03:15
3.	"Je sors" (I’m Going Out)	02:58
4.	"Pauvre Félicité" (Poor Félicité)	03:13
5.	"Je t’aime bien, Papa" (I Like You Very Much, Papa)	06:33
6.	"La partie de cartes" (The Card Game)	06:11
7.	"Le petit déjeuner et l’histoire de Zoé" (The Breakfast and Zoé’s Story)	05:57

In 1960, Pagnol’s distribution company, the Compagnie méditerranéenne de films, released the film soundtrack on disc, interspersed with narrative comments and descriptions spoken by Pagnol. In complement came a reading of Pagnol's preface to the play, which was written for the publication of his complete works and was later collected in the 1981 volume Confidences, and of recollections about the production of the film, which were later published as part of the augmented edition of his 1934 essay French: Cinématurgie de Paris. The album was re-issued on CD by Frémeaux & Associés, in their “Librairie sonore” series.

== In popular culture ==
- Alice Waters, the famed restaurateur and founder of California cuisine, was so taken by the Marseille Trilogy that she named her Berkeley restaurant "Chez Panisse". The café upstairs from the restaurant is decorated with posters from the films Marius, Fanny, and César.
- The main characters of the Marseille Trilogy make a cameo appearance in the Asterix comic book Asterix and the Banquet. The card-playing scene in the comic book is a reference to a similar scene in Marius.

== See also ==
- Port of Seven Seas (1938) – an American film based on both Marius and Fanny starring Wallace Beery and directed by James Whale
- Fanny (1961) – a non-musical American film based on the 1954 stage musical adaptation of the Marseille Trilogy
- Marius (2013) – a French film adapted by, directed by, and starring Daniel Auteuil
