= Monsieur Brotonneau =

- Directed by: Alexander Esway
- Written by: Gaston Arman de Caillavet (play); Marcel Pagnol; Robert de Flers (play)
- Starring: Raimu; Josette Day; Marguerite Pierry
- Cinematography: Curt Courant
- Music by: Vincent Scotto
- Production company: Films Marcel Pagnol
- Distributed by: Films Marcel Pagnol
- Release date: 4 August 1939
- Running time: 100 minutes
- Country: France
- Language: French

Monsieur Brotonneau is a 1939 French comedy drama film directed by Alexander Esway and starring Raimu, Josette Day and Marguerite Pierry.

The film was released not a month before France declared war to Nazi Germany.

== Synopsis ==
Monsieur Brotonneau leaves his cheating wife Thérèse for his secretary Louise. When his apparently repentant wife returns he reconciles her while continuing to love his mistress.

== Cast ==
- Raimu as M. Brotonneau
- Josette Day as Louise
- Marguerite Pierry as Thérèse Brotonneau
- Saturnin Fabre as M. de Berville
- Robert Vattier as William Herrer
- Léon Belières as Lardier, l'employé
- Robert Bassac as Friedel
- Pierre Feuillère as Jacques Herrer
- Claire Gérard as Céleste, la bonne
- Jean Témerson as L'huissier

== Production ==
Josette Day joined the cast on the recommendation of Raimu to the director. Production started slowly, a new director having been chosen, after Marcel Pagnol left the project.

== Bibliography ==
- Crisp, Colin. Genre, Myth and Convention in the French Cinema, 1929-1939. Indiana University Press, 2002.
