= William Tabbert =

American actor

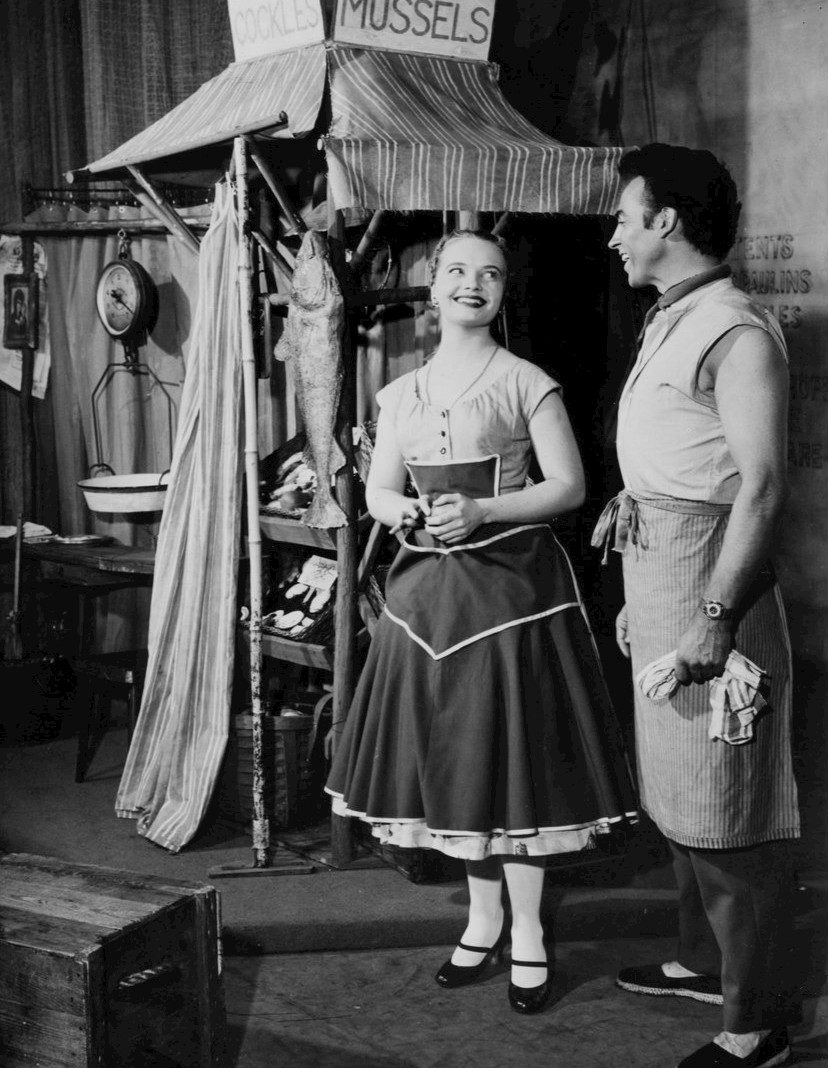
- Tabbert as Marius with Florence Henderson in the Broadway production of Fanny, 1955.
- Born: October 5, 1919; Chicago, Illinois, United States
- Died: October 19, 1974 (aged 55); New York City, New, York, United States
- Occupations: Actor, singer
- Spouse: Evelyn Rainey
- Writing career
- Years active: 1943–1974

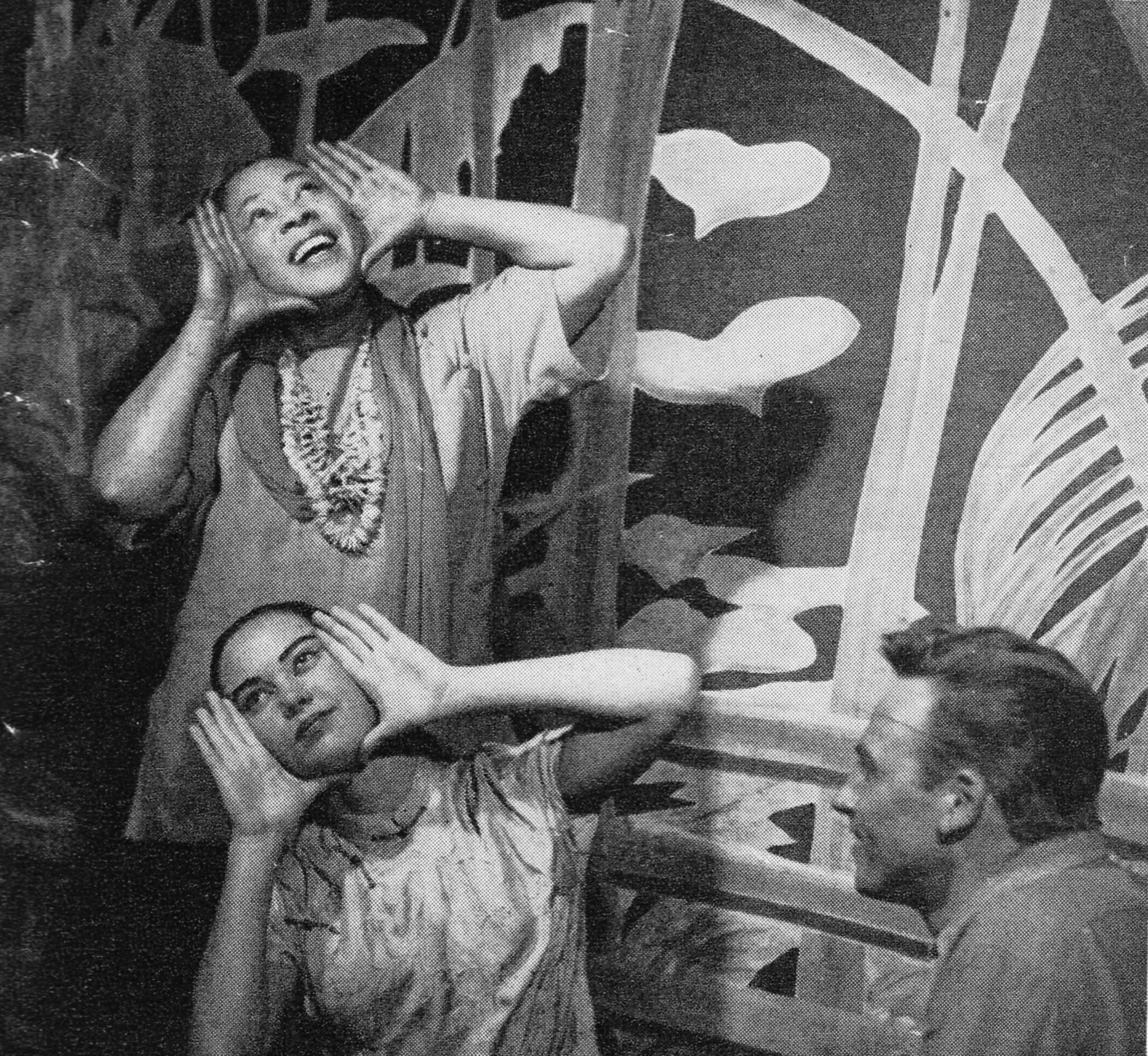
From top: Juanita Hall as Bloody Mary singing "Happy Talk", Betta St. John as Liat, and William Tabbert as Lt. Cable in the original Broadway cast of South Pacific (1950)

William Tabbert (October 5, 1919 – October 19, 1974) was an American actor and singer primarily remembered as Lieutenant Joseph Cable in the original Broadway production of Rodgers and Hammerstein's musical South Pacific, where he introduced the songs "Younger Than Springtime" and "You've Got to Be Carefully Taught".

== Early life ==
Tabbert was born on October 5, 1919, in Chicago, Illinois, the second son of William Frank and Edith Victoria (née Johnson) Tabbert. His father was the son of German immigrants and supported his family working as a railroad engineer. His mother was the daughter of Swedish immigrants who had settled in Minnesota during the 1880s.

By 1930, though both their parents were still alive, William and his older brother Spencer were residents of Lawrence Hall, a Chicago institution that sheltered homeless and orphaned boys. Spencer would go on to serve in the army during the Second World War, while a bout of pneumonia ended William's brief military service.

== Career ==
Tabbert's road to Broadway began during his senior year at Chicago's Hirsch Metropolitan High School when he won a three-year scholarship sponsored by the Chicago Daily Tribune to study grand opera with soprano Anna Fitziu. During his high school years Tabbert was active as a baritone singer at school events and as a contestant in several community talent contests. After his graduation in 1939 Tabbert supported himself as he studied music by performing small parts with the Chicago Civic Opera Company and singing at local area night spots.

In 1941 Tabbert married dancer Evelyn Rainey and began to think about expanding his career. The war intervened though, forcing him to put his plans on hold until after being discharged from the army and recovering his health. Broadway during the war, like most other war era industries, was suffering a manpower shortage which, starting in 1943, opened the door for Tabbert to appear in musicals like What's Up?, Follow the Girls, Seven Lively Arts, Billion Dollar Baby and Three to Make Ready.

After the success of the long-running South Pacific, Tabbert returned to singing at night clubs and appeared regularly on radio and television shows such as The Ed Sullivan Show, The Voice of Firestone and Armstrong Circle Theater. In 1954 he hosted the Bill Tabbert Show for ABC television and that same year made his final Broadway appearance in Fanny with Ezio Pinza, Walter Slezak and Florence Henderson. Of his performance, critic Brooks Atkinson wrote: "Mr. Tabbert pours his familiar vitality into a sort of sea spiritual called "Restless Heart" and a song of despair entitled "Fanny". Tabbert was a regular performer at summer evening concerts held at City College of New York's Lewisohn Stadium and in musical theatrical production performed across the country.

== Death ==
Bill Tabbert died of a heart attack on October 19, 1974, in New York City while rehearsing for an upcoming show. He was only fifty-five and was survived by his wife (Evelyn Rainey Tabbert), 2 sons (William "Billy" Tabbert and Christopher Tabbert), daughter (Caprice Tabbert), father (William Frank Tabbert), brother (Spencer Tabbert) and granddaughter (Christina Renee Adamé). His mother (Edith Tabbert) had died two years earlier.
