= Asterix and the Banquet =

Comic book album

Asterix and the Banquet (Le Tour de Gaule d'Astérix)
- Cover of the English edition
- Date: 1965
- Main characters: Asterix and Obelix
- Series: Asterix

Creative team
- Writers: René Goscinny
- Artists: Albert Uderzo

Original publication
- Published in: Pilote magazine
- Issues: 172–213
- Date of publication: 1963
- Language: French

Translation
- Translator: Anthea Bell and Derek Hockridge

Chronology
- Preceded by: Asterix the Gladiator
- Followed by: Asterix and Cleopatra

Asterix and the Banquet (also known as "Asterix's Tour of Gaul" - translated from French: Le Tour de Gaule d'Astérix) is a French comic book story, written by René Goscinny and illustrated by Albert Uderzo. It is the fifth story in the Asterix comic book series, and was originally published by Dargaud as a serial for Pilote magazine in 1963, before later being released as a comic album in 1965.

The story focuses on Asterix and Obelix travelling around Gaul to find and secure various delicacies in order to win a bet against a Roman Prefect that seeks to keep their village isolated from the rest of the world. Much of the plot features notable parodies and cultural references surrounding France, including its history and society, and was the first to introduce the character of Dogmatix, after Goscinny and Uderzo found him to be popular with readers.

Asterix and the Banquet received positive reviews following its publication, with the original cover of the comic later being sold for a record sum in an auction in Paris in 2017.

== Plot summary ==
Prefect Overanxius, sent by Rome as an Inspector General, arrives at the fortified camp of Compendium in Armorica. Upon arriving, he informs the camp's commander he intends to conquer the Gaulish village that resist Roman rule. Despite protests against this, the camp reluctantly leads an assault - which is promptly repelled by the Gauls thanks to the power of the magic potion that grants them superhuman strength. Undeterred, Overanxius orders the camp to erect a stockade around the village so that it's isolated from the rest of the world.

The village promptly resents this, leading to Asterix issuing a challenge to Overanxius: if he can escape the stockage and successfully secure for his village many of the delicacies of Gaul for a banquet, the Romans must tear down the stockade in defeat. Overanxius agrees to the challenge; however, after Asterix and Obelix breach the stockade to begin their journey, he promptly sends word to every Roman garrison in Gaul to find and arrest the pair. After securing their first item in Lutetia (Paris), Asterix and Obelix purchase a useless horse and chariot by a dishonest salesman; they later steal a Roman breakdown chariot to replace these.

Upon reaching Camaracum (Cambrai) to buy boiled sweets, they find that many Gauls have heard of Asterix's challenge. While some are willing to help them win their challenge by causing problems for the Romans, others secretly hope to betray the pair for a reward from the Romans. Evading Roman patrols, Asterix and Obelix secure purchases in Durocortorum (Reims), Lugdunum (Lyon), Nicae (Nice), Massilia (Marseille) and Tolosa (Toulouse), but are robbed by two Roman highwaymen when they camp for the night. Pursuing the thieves to Burdigala (Bordeaux), the pair manage to recover the stolen items after Roman soldiers mistake the thieves for them.

After sourcing their next item in the city, they securing passage to Gesocribatum (Le Conquet) on a ship run by Captain Seniorservix - who is honored to help them and smuggles them into the city after they protect his ship from the pirates. Securing the last item, the pair return to their village which arranges the banquet. Asterix promptly invites Overanxius to witness his victory before punching him for acting dishourably during their bet. As the villagers celebrate Asterix's triumph, Obelix discovers that they had been followed since their stop in Lutetia by a small white dog, whom he immediately adopts.

== Characters ==
- Asterix – Gaulish warrior, and the main protagonist of the story.
- Obelix – Gaulish menhir delivery man and warrior, and a close friend of Asterix. This story introduced a running gag for the character that would occur in later stories, in which he would often protest against any mention of himself being "fat".
- Dogmatix – A small white dog, who follows Asterix and Obelix on their journey. The character (unnamed in this comic) was meant by Goscinny to be a running gag for the story. However, they proved a popular creation that the Asterix creators decided to keep him as a mascot for the series, going against Goscinny's original notion that it should not feature any pets for the main characters.
- Getafix – Gaulish druid of the village, responsible for the superhuman magic potion they use.
- Vitalstatistix – Chief of the Gaulish village.
- Prefect Overanxius – A Roman official, designated as Inspector General, sent by Rome to deal with the Gaulish village in Armorica.
- Centurion Lotuseatus – The current commander of the Camp of Compendium. While the French publication reused the same character and their name - Gracchus Nenjetépus (in the English version, known as Gracchus Armisurplus) - from Asterix the Gladiator, all other international publication renamed the character.
- Seniorservix – Gaulish captain of a menhir trading ship.
- The Pirates – A group of pirates led by Captain Redbeard, who often suffer bad luck with the Gauls.

== Cultural references ==
Asterix and the Banquet featured many cultural references to France and the various regions, along with its culture. The plot of the comic was deeply inspired by the Tour de France bicycle race. Alongside this, other major references to France included:

- In the original publication, the sack carried by Obelix was coloured yellow with a white patch, in reference to the race leader's jersey in the Tour de France. (In a noticeable error on the cover of the collected edition, the sack is instead green with a yellow patch)
- The dishes are Lutentian ham, bêtises de Camaracum, wines from Durocortum, sausages and meatballs of Lugdunum, Nicae salad, Massilian fish stew, Tolosa sausages, Aginum prunes, and oysters and white wine from Burdigala.
- A scene involving the backalleys of Lugdunum, references the traboules of Lyon that were used by the French Resistance during World War II. The creators paid homage to the Resistance with a parody outfit called "The Gaulish Resistance".
- Several scenes in Massilia on the 36th page reference the works of filmmaker Marcel Pagnol - Marius (1931), Fanny (1932) and César (1936). Pagnol greatly approved of the parodies the Asterix creators made, remarking that "work will be immortal...because it's appeared in Astérix!"
- A number of parodies reflecting the regional stereotypes of inhabitants of Normandy and Marseille, as well as Parisian traffic and the holiday season in Nice.
- A phrase in the comic - "Je vous promets qu'on n'a pas fini d'en parler de l'affaire du courrier de Lugdunum!" - is a reference to a late 18th century trial involving an innocent man who was wrongfully convicted and executed for a robbery that led to murder.

In addition, the comic featured other cultural references:

- A quote made by Roman poet Horace - "Exegi monumentum aere perennius" (translated: "I have erected a monument more lasting than bronze.") - is uttered by a legionnaire during the scene involving the stockade's construction.
- A phrase written by Roman poet Lucan in The Pharsalia - "Victrix causa diis placuit, sed victa catoni" (translated: "The victorious cause was pleasing to the gods, but the lost cause was pleasing to Cato") - is referenced by a crew member of the pirates after their defeat at the hands of Asterix and Obelix.
- In a scene at the candy shop that the Gauls visit, the creators made reference to the play Patient Grissel with the lyrics from the lullaby Golden Slumbers.

== Legacy ==
In October 2017, the book's original cover illustration, signed by the authors, was sold at a Paris auction for a record €1.4 million.
