= Fanny (2013 film) =

- Film poster
- Directed by: Daniel Auteuil
- Screenplay by: Daniel Auteuil
- Based on: Fanny; 1929 play by Marcel Pagnol
- Produced by: Julien Madon; Alain Sarde; Jérôme Seydoux
- Starring: Daniel Auteuil; Victoire Bélézy; Jean-Pierre Darroussin; Raphaël Personnaz; Marie-Anne Chazel; Nicolas Vaude; Daniel Russo; Ariane Ascaride
- Cinematography: Jean-François Robin
- Edited by: Joëlle Hache
- Music by: Alexandre Desplat
- Production companies: A.S. Films; Pathé Production; Zack Films
- Distributed by: Pathé Distribution
- Release date: 10 July 2013
- Running time: 102 minutes
- Country: France
- Language: French
- Budget: $8 million
- Box office: $363.000

Fanny is a 2013 French film adaptation of the 1931 play of the same name by Marcel Pagnol. The play was the second part in Pagnol's Marseille trilogy, which began with Marius (1929) and concluded with César (1936). The 2013 film stars Daniel Auteuil, Victoire Bélézy, Raphaël Personnaz, Marie-Anne Chazel, Jean-Pierre Darroussin, Daniel Russo, Ariane Ascaride and Nicolas Vaude. Auteuil also directed and wrote the screenplay.

== Cast ==
- Daniel Auteuil as César
- Victoire Bélézy as Fanny
- Jean-Pierre Darroussin as Panisse
- Raphaël Personnaz as Marius
- Marie-Anne Chazel as Honorine
- Nicolas Vaude as Monsieur Brun
- Daniel Russo as Escartefigue
- Ariane Ascaride as Claudine
- Jean-Louis Barcelona as Frisepoulet
- Georges Neri as Elzéar
- Martine Diotalevi as Madame Escartefigue
- Michèle Granier as Anaïs
- Aline Choisi as Rosaline
- Vivette Choisi as Madame Roumieux

== Critical response ==
On the review aggregator website Rotten Tomatoes, the film has an approval rating of 63%, based on 8 reviews, with an average rating of 4.9/10. On Metacritic, the film has a weighted average score of 47 out of 100, based on 7 critics, indicating "mixed or average reviews".

== Accolades ==
Award / Film Festival	Category	Recipients and nominees	Result
Cabourg Film Festival	Premiers Rendez-vous	Victoire Bélézy	Won
