= Three Waltzes =

1938 film

- Directed by: Ludwig Berger
- Written by: Léopold Marchand (scenario and operetta); Hans Müller; Albert Willemetz (operetta); Paul Knepler (operetta); Armin Robinson (operetta)
- Produced by: Barend Broekman
- Starring: Yvonne Printemps; Pierre Fresnay; Henri Guisol
- Cinematography: Guy Delattre; Paul Portier; Eugen Schüfftan
- Edited by: Bernard Séjourné
- Music by: Oscar Straus
- Production company: SOFROR
- Distributed by: Védis Films
- Release date: 14 December 1938
- Running time: 90 minutes
- Country: France
- Language: French

Three Waltzes (French: Les trois valses) is a 1938 French historical musical film directed by Ludwig Berger and starring Yvonne Printemps, Pierre Fresnay and Henri Guisol. It is an operetta film, based on music by Oscar Straus. The film's sets were designed by the art directors Jean d'Eaubonne, Raymond Gabutti and Jacques Gut.

== Cast ==
- Yvonne Printemps as Fanny Grandpré, Yvette Grandpré and Irène Grandpré
- Pierre Fresnay as Octave de Chalencey, Philippe de Chalencey and Gérard de Chalencey
- Henri Guisol as Brunner fils
- Jean Périer as Le président Lebrun
- Pierre Stéphen as Le journaliste
- Robert Vattier as Le metteur en scène
- Jeanne Helbling as Impératrice Eugénie
- Max Maxudian as Napoléon III
- Georges Cahuzac as L'acteur jouant l'Empereur
- Adolf E. Licho as Le producteur
- Paul Demange as Le régisseur
- Guy Sloux as Antoine
- Yolanda as La chanteuse
- Laure Diana as Une petite femme
- France Ellys as La marquise de Chalencey
- Jane Marken as Céleste
- Missia as L'habilleuse
- Colette Régis as Sarah Bernhardt
- Génia Vaury as L'actrice jouant l'Impératrice
- Guillaume de Sax as Le maréchal
- Louis-Jacques Boucot as Brunner père
- Buguet as Le ténor
- Raymond Dandy
- Davia
- Jean Dorane as Un groom
- Luce Fabiole as La dame du vestiaire
- Pierre Ferval
- Gustave Gallet as Un agent d'assurances
- Claire Gérard as La femme de Cyprien
- Armand Larcher as Le directeur des studios
- Charles Lemontier as Le maître d'hôtel
- Germaine Michel as Madame Morel
- André Numès Fils as Le pompier
- Julienne Paroli as La mère d'une danseuse
- Jeanne Reinhardt as Une petite femme
- Emile Roques
- Noël Roquevert as Un douanier à l'aérodrome
- Maurice Schutz as Cyprien
- André Siméon as Le portier du théâtre
- Léo Staats as Beltramini
- Pierre Vimont as L' assistant

== Bibliography ==
- Diffrient, David Scott. Omnibus Films: Theorizing Transauthorial Cinema. Edinburgh University Press, 2014.
