= Robert Vattier =

French actor

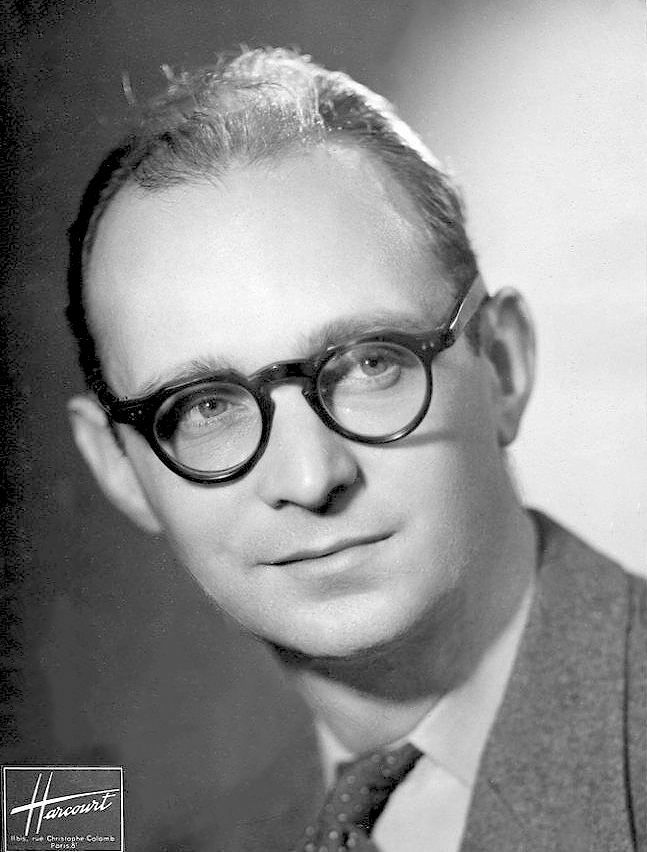
- 1940
- Born: 2 October 1906; France
- Died: 9 December 1982 (aged 76); France
- Occupation: Actor
- Years active: 1931–1972

Robert Vattier (2 October 1906 – 9 December 1982) was a French actor.

He was the father of the comedic actress Bérangère Vattier. His sister was actress Nicole Vattier, a star of the 1930s.

== Selected filmography ==
- Marius (1931) - Albert Brun
- Fanny (1932) - Albert Brun
- Vers l'abîme (1934) - Barrick
- Minuit, place Pigalle (1934)
- Jeanne (1934) - Charles Fuqui
- Gaspard de Besse (1935) - La Griffe
- The Terrible Lovers (1936) - L'avocat de Annette
- César (1936) - Aldebert Brun
- Adventure in Paris (1936) - Maître Corneille - l'huissier
- Le coeur dispose (1937) - Pretendant
- L'appel de la vie (1937) - Pièche
- La chanson du souvenir (1937) - Florian
- The Messenger (1937) - Le représentant (uncredited)
- Heartbeat (1938) - Astruc
- The Baker's Wife (1938) - Le curé
- Three Waltzes (1938) - Le metteur en scène
- Le moulin dans le soleil (1938)
- Le club des fadas (1939)
- Monsieur Brotonneau (1939) - William Herrer
- The Last of the Six (1941) - L'administrateur (uncredited)
- Madame Sans-Gêne (1941) - Jasmin
- Le Lit à colonnes (1942) - Un inspecteur (uncredited)
- Andorra ou les hommes d'Airain (1942) - Le Bayle
- Love Letters (1942) - Maître Boubousson
- La Main du diable (1943) - Perrier (uncredited)
- Un seul amour (1943) - Gontran de La Tournelle
- Bonsoir mesdames, bonsoir messieurs (1944) - Coulant
- The Ideal Couple (1946) - Le commissaire
- The Adventure of Cabassou (1946) - De Salicette
- Si jeunesse savait... (1948) - Lucien Bigne
- Between Eleven and Midnight (1949) - Charlie
- The King (1949) - Marquis de Chamarande
- La Marie du port (1950) - Le client de la brasserie mécontent
- La Ronde (1950) - Le professeur Schüller (uncredited)
- No Pity for Women (1950) - Adolphe Mercier - un homme d'affaires
- The Girl from Maxim's (1950) - Le docteur Montgicourt
- Atoll K (1951) - Le notaire français
- The Strange Madame X (1951) - Moissac
- La vie est un jeu (1951)
- The Most Beautiful Girl in the World (1951) - Le procureur Paul Thomas
- Massacre in Lace (1952) - Arsène de Loubiac
- The Crime of Bouif (1952) - Le juge d'instruction
- Women Are Angels (1952) - Le docteur
- Bille de clown (1952)
- Manon of the Spring (1952) - Monsieur Belloiseau
- Au diable la vertu (1953) - Le juge d'instruction
- Children of Love (1953) - Albert
- Obsession (1954) - Le directeur de l'hôtel (uncredited)
- Letters from My Windmill (1954) - Le père Abbé (segment "Elixir du père Gaucher, L'")
- Trois de la Canebière (1955) - Bienaimé
- Ces sacrées vacances (1956) - L'inspecteur Ferracci
- Magirama (1956)
- Miss Catastrophe (1957) - Le colonel
- Irresistible Catherine (1957) - Me Revering
- Vacances explosives! (1957) - Fernand Morel
- On Foot, on Horse, and on Wheels (1957) - L'inspecteur du permis de conduire
- Love Is at Stake (1957) - (uncredited)
- Isabelle Is Afraid of Men (1957) - M. Brissac
- Fumée blonde (1957) - Le commissaire
- Les Truands (1957) - Le duc de Morny
- It's All Adam's Fault (1958) - Noël
- Neither Seen Nor Recognized (1958) - Lerechigneux, le juge
- School for Coquettes (1958) - Racinet
- Madame et son auto (1958) - M. Margaillat
- La p... sentimentale (1958) - Vachette - le surveillant général
- Péché de jeunesse (1958) - Monsieur Chale, un pensionnaire
- Dangerous Games (1958) - De Fontbelle, le professeur de violon
- Houla Houla (1959) - Le directeur d'école
- Soupe au lait (1959) - Le directeur
- The Love Game (1960) - L'acheteur galant
- Le mouton (1960) - Le directeur de la prison
- The President (1961) - Docteur Fumet
- Spotlight on a Murderer (1961) - Le notaire
- La traversée de la Loire (1962)
- Le petit monstre (1965)
- Asterix the Gaul (1967) - (voice)
- L'oeuf (1972) - Monsieur Raffard
- Far from Dallas (1972) - Inspector
- Nuova Colonia (1978) - Tobba
