= Alida Rouffe =

French actress

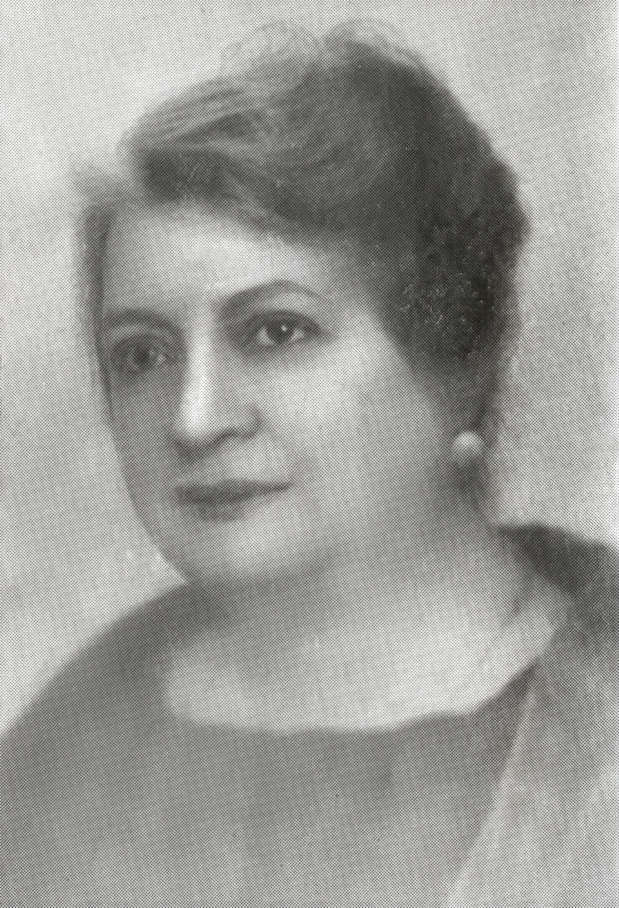
- Born: Joséphine Marie Rouffe; 20 March 1874; Bordeaux, Gironde, France
- Died: 21 November 1949 (aged 75); Marseille, Bouches-du-Rhône, France
- Occupation: Actress

Alida Rouffe (1874–1949) was a French actress.

Joséphine Marie Rouffe was born on 20 March 1874 in Bordeaux. Her father was mime artist Louis Rouffe (1849-1885).

She spent most of her career on stage in the south of France, and like her father, she performed in the Alcazar. Later, she acted in many films, including those directed by Marcel Pagnol.

She died on 21 November 1949 in Marseille.

== Filmography ==
- Marius (dir. Alexander Korda, 1931).
- Mam'zelle Nitouche (dir. Marc Allégret, 1931).
- Toine (dir. René Gaveau, 1932).
- Fanny (dir. Marc Allégret, 1932).
- Paris-Soleil (dir. Jean Hémard, 1932).
- Cigalon (dir. Marcel Pagnol, 1935).
- Topaze (dir. Marcel Pagnol, 1936).
- César (dir. Marcel Pagnol, 1936).
- Le Chanteur de minuit (dir. Léo Joannon, 1937).
- Le Schpountz (dir. Marcel Pagnol, 1938).
- La femme du boulanger (dir. Marcel Pagnol, 1938).
- Le Club des fadas (dir. Émile Couzinet, 1939)
- Le Paradis des voleurs (dir. Lucien Marsoudet, 1939).
- Le Gardian (dir. Jean de Marguenat, 1945).
