= Fanny (musical) =

- Original cast recording
- Music: Harold Rome
- Lyrics: Harold Rome
- Book: S. N. Behrman; Joshua Logan
- Basis: Marius, Fanny, and César by Marcel Pagnol
- Productions: 1954 Broadway; 1956 West End

Fanny is a musical with a book by S. N. Behrman and Joshua Logan and music and lyrics by Harold Rome. A tale of love, secrets, and passion set in and around the old French port of Marseille, it is based on Marcel Pagnol's trilogy of works titled Marius (1929), Fanny (1931), and César (1936).

The musical premiered on Broadway in 1954 and ran for 888 performances, and later was staged in the West End.

== Plot ==
Fanny is a young woman whose childhood love, Marius, leaves her to go to sea as a sailor for five years. His father Cesar, a tavern owner, disowns him. After his departure, Fanny discovers she is pregnant. Under pressure from her mother, she marries Panisse, a wealthy older widower, whose delight at having an heir prompts him to keep the newborn boy's illegitimacy a secret. Marius returns on his son Cesario's first birthday to claim both him and Fanny, but he is turned away by Cesar, who is Panisse's best friend. As the years pass Cesario, now 13, longs to go to sea like his father, and runs away to join him. This is too much for the now ill and aged Panisse. Marius brings Cesario back to fulfill Panisse's dying wish for Marius and Fanny to be together.

The role of Acolyte was originated by then-child actor Gary Wright who went on to become a successful musician and is best known for his highly popular 1976 hit single "Dream Weaver". While still in the show, Wright replaced Lloyd Reese in the role of Cesario.

== Productions ==
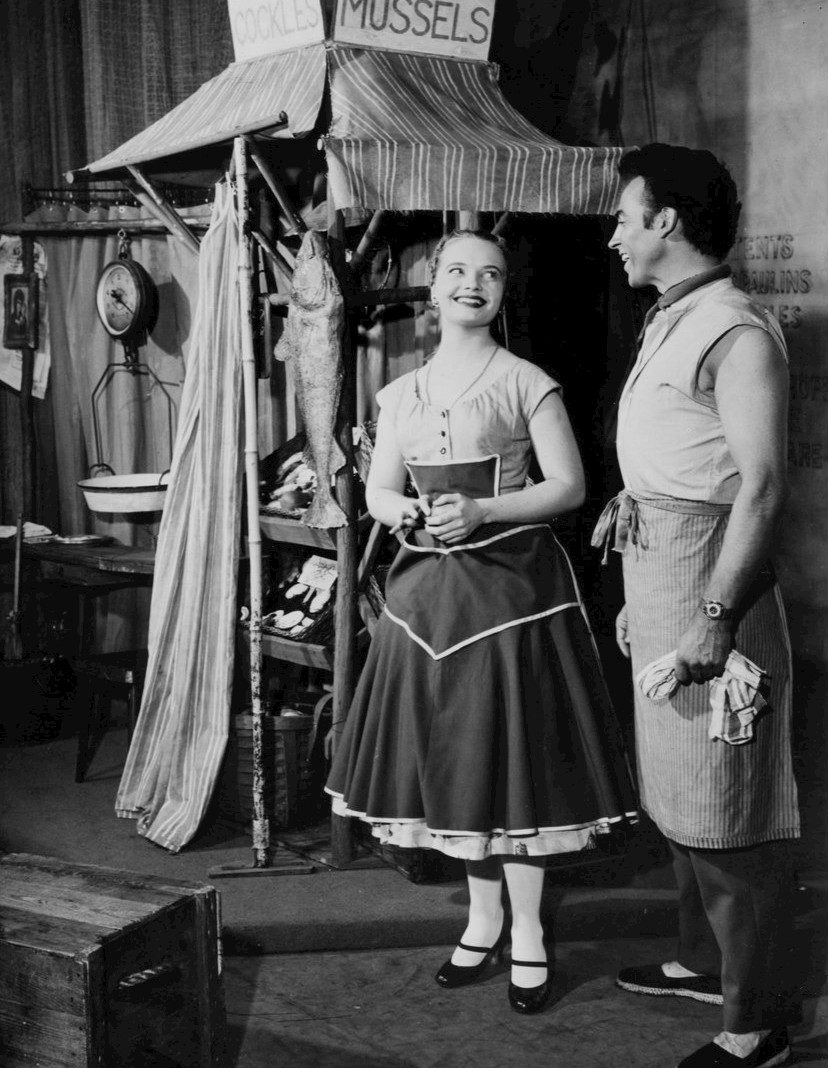
Florence Henderson and William Tabbert in the original Broadway production of Fanny

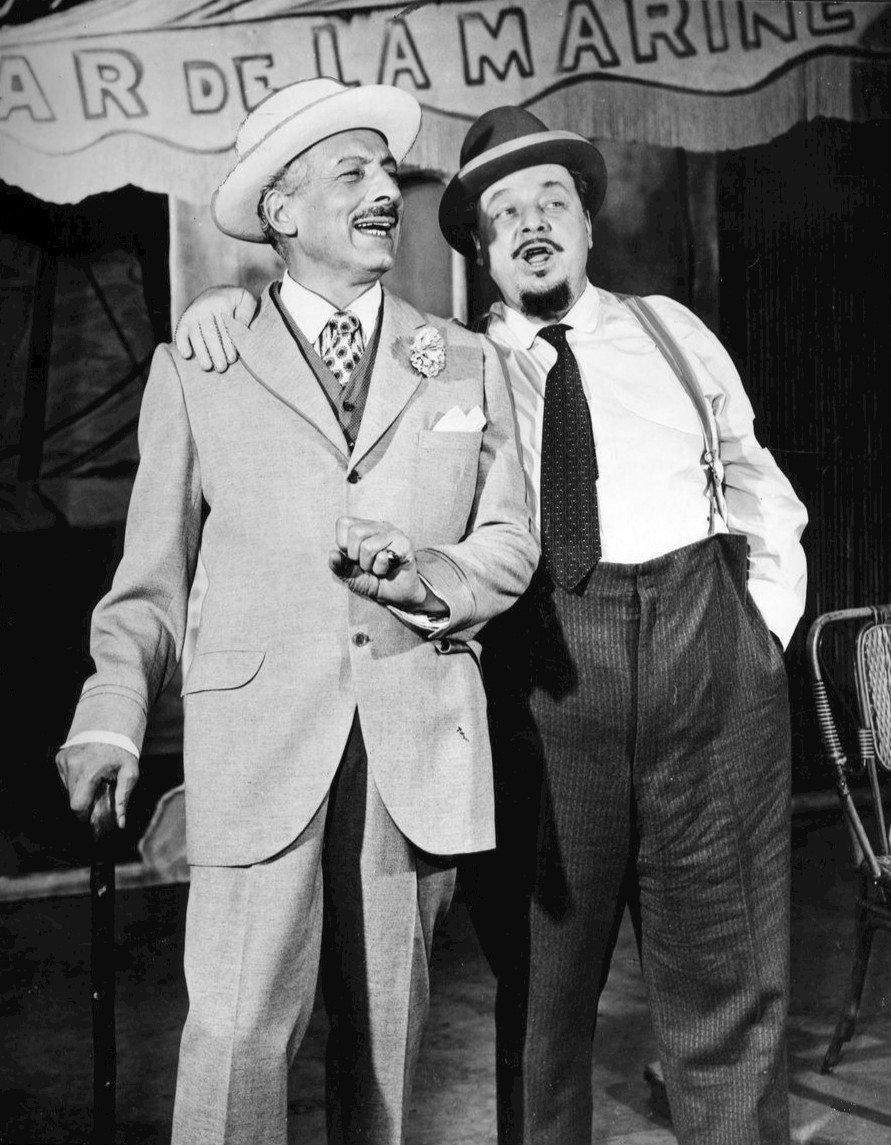
Ezio Pinza and Walter Slezak in the original Broadway production of Fanny

The Broadway production opened at the Majestic Theatre on November 4, 1954, transferred to the Belasco Theatre on December 4, 1956 and closed on December 16, 1956 after a total run of 888 performances. Directed by Logan and choreographed by Helen Tamiris, the original cast included Florence Henderson as Fanny, Ezio Pinza as Cesar, William Tabbert as Marius, and Walter Slezak as Panisse. Scenic and lighting design were by Jo Mielziner. Slezak won the Tony Award for Best Performance by a Leading Actor in a Musical.

The West End production opened at the Drury Lane Theatre in 1956. The cast included Robert Morley, Kevin Scott, Ian Wallace and Janet Pavek. The 1956 London production is one of the earliest filmed stage performances for the then-new ITV network of the UK; and was broadcast as promotion for the live production.

The Goodspeed Opera House in East Haddam, Connecticut produced the musical in 1986 with Chester Ludgin as Cesar, David Hurst as Panisse, and Karen Culliver as Fanny.

The Paper Mill Playhouse in Milburn, New Jersey produced Fanny in 1990. Directed by Robert Johanson, the cast featured George S. Irving as Panisse, José Ferrer as Cesar, and Teri Bibb as Fanny.

42nd Street Moon in San Francisco, California presented a concert version of "Fanny" in September 1997, as the fourth show in its Lost Musical Series 1997 "Composer-Lyricist Festival," celebrating five great Broadway composers who also wrote their own lyrics. The cast featured Caroline Altman as Fanny, Kelly Houston as Cesar, Pierce Peter Brandt as Marius, Darren Criss (in his first professional acting role) as Cesario, and Lucinda Hitchcock-Cone as Honorine, Fanny's mother.

The LOST MUSICALS™ project presented Fanny at the Victoria and Albert's Theatre Museum in 1990 with Jonathan Adams and James Corden and in the Lilian Baylis Theatre, Sadler's Wells, London in 2005.

Encores! presented a staged concert at City Center from February 4, 2010 to February 7. The director was Mark Bruni, choreography by Lorin Latarro, with a cast that featured Elena Shaddow (Fanny), Fred Applegate (Panisse), George Hearn (Cesar), David Patrick Kelly (The Admiral), Priscilla Lopez (Honorine), Michael McCormick (Escartifique), James Snyder (Marius) and Ted Sutherland (Cesario). The production received mixed reviews.

== Musical numbers ==
The musical numbers from the 1954 Pre-Broadway production are as follows:

Act I

- "Restless Heart" – Marius
  - "Duet" - Marius and Fanny
- "Welcome Home" – Cesar
- "Why Be Afraid to Dance?" – Fanny and Ensemble
- "Octopus Song" – The Admiral
- "Never Too Late for Love" – Panisse and Ensemble
- "Cold Cream Jar Song" – Panisse
- "I Like You" – Marius and Cesar
- "Shika" – Arab Dancing Girl, Rug Seller and Ensemble
- "I Have to Tell You" – Fanny
- "Fanny" – Marius
  - "Duet" - Marius and Fanny
- "Montage" - Cesar and Ensemble
  - "Fanny"
  - "Restless Heart"
  - "I Like You"
- "Oysters, Cockles and Mussels" – Ensemble
- "Panisse and Son" – Panisse
  - "Act One Finale" - Ensemble

Act II

- "Birthday Song" – Fanny, Honorine and Ensemble
- "To My Wife" – Panisse
- "Welcome Home" (Reprise) – Marius
- "The Thought of You" – Marius
- "Love is a Very Light Thing" – Cesar
- "Other Hands, Other Hearts" – Fanny and Marius
- "Montage" - Ensemble
- "Be Kind to Your Parents" – Fanny and Cesario
- "Divertissement"
  - "Slave Dance" - Nejla Ates and Ensemble
  - "Rope Dance" - Dean Crane, Nejla Ates and Ensemble
- "Restless Heart (Reprise)" - Ensemble
  - Finale - Ensemble

The musical numbers from the 1954 Broadway production are as follows:

Act I

- "Octopus Song" – The Admiral
- "Restless Heart" – Marius and Male Ensemble
- "Never Too Late for Love" – Panisse and Ensemble
- "Cold Cream Jar Song" – Panisse
- "Does He Know?" - Fanny and Marius
- "Why Be Afraid to Dance?" – Cesar, Marius, Fanny and Ensemble
  - Danced by Cesar, Marius, Fanny and Ensemble
- "Never Too Late for Love" (Reprise) – Cesar, Panisse and Honorine
- "Shika, Shika" – Arab Dancing Girl, Rug Seller and Ensemble
- "Welcome Home" – Cesar
- "I Like You" – Marius and Cesar
- "I Have to Tell You" – Fanny
- "Fanny" – Marius
- "The Sailing" – Fanny, Marius, Cesar and Ensemble
- "Oysters, Cockles and Mussels" – Ensemble
- "Panisse and Son" – Panisse
- "Wedding Dance" – Danced by Charles Blackwell and Ensemble
- "Act One Finale" - Ensemble

Act II

- "Birthday Song" – Fanny, Honorine and Ensemble
- "To My Wife" – Panisse
- "The Thought of You" – Marius and Fanny
- "Love is a Very Light Thing" – Cesar
- "Other Hands, Other Hearts" – Fanny, Cesar and Marius
- "Fanny" (Reprise) – Fanny, Cesar and Marius
- "Montage" - Ensemble
- "Be Kind to Your Parents" – Fanny and Cesario
- "Cesario's Party (Cirque Francais)"
  - Acrobats - Charles Blackwell, Michael de Marco, Ray Dorian, Bill Pope, Toni Wheelis
  - Pony and Trainer - Wally Strauss, Steve Wiland
  - Trained Seals - Dran and Tani Seitz
  - Living Statues - Betty Carr, Ronal Cecill, Norma Doggett, Michael Scrittorale, Ellen Matthews, Dolores Smith
  - Clowns - Herb Banke, Mike Mason, Henry Michel, Jack Washburn
  - Finale - Aerialist, Dean Crane and Ensemble
- "Welcome Home" (Reprise) – Cesar and Panisse

The original Broadway cast album was released on compact disc by RCA Victor (9026-68074-2). It includes some of the last recordings by former Metropolitan Opera basso Ezio Pinza.

== Critical reception ==
Brooks Atkinson of The New York Times called the story "genuine and rueful," the music "melodic," and the casting "engaging," resulting "in a thoroughly absorbing theatre experience."

== Film adaptation ==
Joshua Logan directed a 1961 dramatic film adaptation based on both Pagnol's original plays and the book he and S. N. Behrman had written for the stage musical. Although the songs were eliminated, Harold Rome's music was heard in the soundtrack underscore. The film starred Leslie Caron, Maurice Chevalier, Charles Boyer, and Horst Buchholz.

== See also ==
- Illegitimacy in fiction
- Nejla Ateş and Mohammed El-Bakkar, belly dancer and oud musician appearing in the original Broadway production
