= Orane Demazis =

French actress

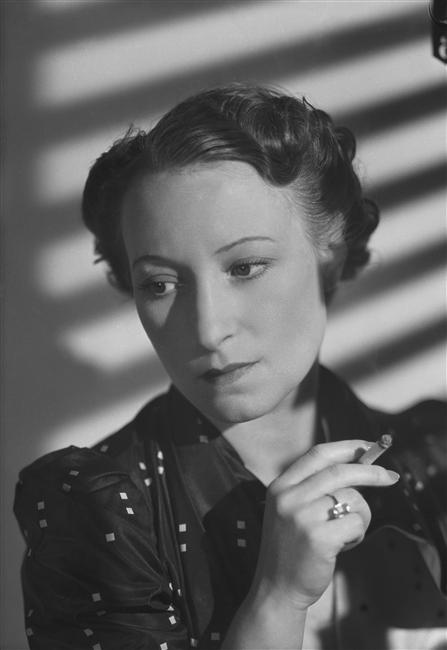

Orane Demazis (4 September 1894 – 25 December 1991) was a French actress.

== Biography ==
Born Henriette Marie Louise Burgart in Oran, French Algeria, in a family of Alsatian origin, Demazis entered the Paris Conservatoire National Supérieur d'Art Dramatique in 1919. She formed her stage name after her birthplace of Oran and the name of Mazis, another nearby town. Upon graduating in 1922, she joined the Théâtre de l'Atelier cast directed by Charles Dullin. Between 1922 and 1926, she starred in Carmosine by Alfred de Musset, L'Occasion by Prosper Mérimée, Chacun sa vérité by Pirandello, Petite Lumière et l'Ourse and Huon de Bordeaux by Alexandre Arnoux, Voulez-vous jouer avec moâ by Marcel Achard.

Her encounter with Marcel Pagnol in 1923 marked a turning point in her career, he created some of her most famous roles and in 1933 they had a son, Jean-Pierre Burgart. In 1926, he hired her to act in his play Jazz before creating for her the role of Fanny in Marius (1929) then Fanny (1931), and Caesar (1936).

== Filmography ==
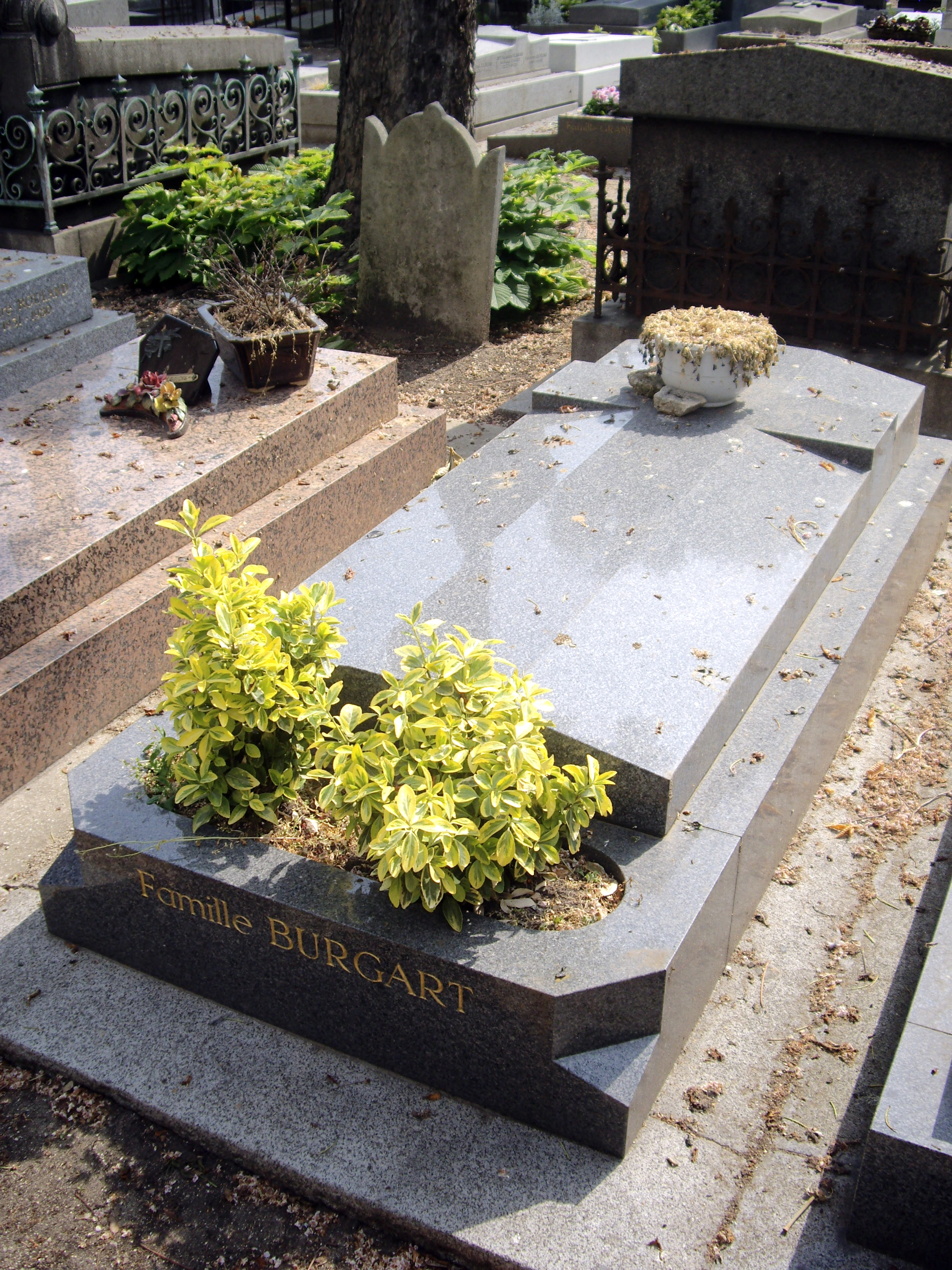
Grave of Orane Demazis, née Burgart, in Auteuil Cemetery (Paris)

- 1931 : Marius by Alexander Korda as Fanny
- 1932 : Fanny by Marc Allégret as Fanny
- 1934 : Angèle by Marcel Pagnol as Angèle
- 1934 : Les Misérables by Raymond Bernard as Éponine Thénardier
- 1936 : César by Marcel Pagnol as Fanny
- 1937 : Harvest (Regain) by Marcel Pagnol as Arsule
- 1938 : Heartbeat (Le Schpountz) by Marcel Pagnol as Françoise
- 1938 : Le Moulin dans le soleil by Marc Didier
- 1939 : Fire in the Straw (Le Feu de paille) by Jean Benoît-Lévy
- 1943 : Mistral by Jacques Houssin
- 1948 : Bagarres by Henri Calef
- 1952 : The Blonde Gypsy (La Caraque blonde) by Jacqueline Audry
- 1957 : Until the Last One by Pierre Billon
- 1957 : The Case of Doctor Laurent by Jean-Paul Le Chanois as Madame Escalin
- 1958 : Police judiciaire by Maurice de Canonge
- 1968 : Au pan coupé by Guy Gilles
- 1973 : Rude Journée pour la reine by René Allio as Catherine
- 1974 : Le Fantôme de la liberté by Luis Buñuel as La mère du premier préfet de police
- 1975 : Souvenirs d'en France by André Téchiné as Augustine
- 1979 : Bastien et Bastienne by Michel Andrieu as Georgette
- 1980 : La Naissance du jour by Jacques Demy as Sido
