= Pierre Fresnay =

French actor (1897–1975)

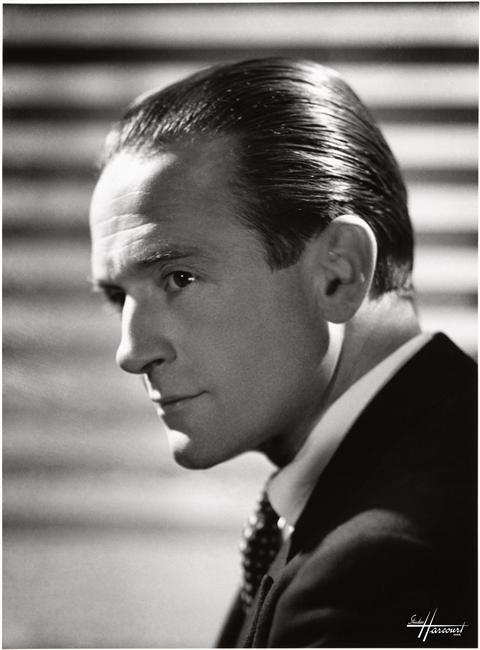
- Pierre Fresnay in 1939.
- Born: Pierre Jules Louis Laudenbach; 4 April 1897; Paris, France
- Died: 9 January 1975 (aged 77); Neuilly-sur-Seine, France
- Occupations: Actor, film director
- Years active: 1910–1974
- Spouse(s): Rachel Berendt; Berthe Bovy
- Partner: Yvonne Printemps

Pierre Fresnay (French pronunciation: [pjɛʁ fʁɛnɛ]; 4 April 1897 – 9 January 1975) was a French stage and film actor.

== Biography ==
Born Pierre Jules Louis Laudenbach, he was encouraged by his uncle, actor Claude Garry, to pursue a career in theater and film. He joined the company at what later was the Théatre de Paris, only to shortly after at the Conservatoire, becoming a pensionnaire of the Comédie-Française in early 1915, returning to it after three years of military service in the French Army in 1919. Before his departure from the Comédie-Française in 1926 Fresnay had played 80 parts in Paris, excelling especially in the works of Alfred de Musset. After playing small roles, in 1915 he was engaged as a pensionnaire without taking an audition at the Comédie-Française, moving up to Mario in Le Jeu de l'amour et du hasard and the title role in Britannicus. After the armistice he appeared as Clitandre in Les Femmes savantes, as well as other juvenile leads. These included Perdican (On ne badine pas avec l'amour by Musset), Valentin (Il ne faut jurer de rien by Musset, which he also directed), Fortunio (Le Chandelier by Musset).

Alongside contemporary creations, his Comédie-Française career continued with Chatterton (Vigny), becoming a valued member of the troupe due to his intelligent acting, the flexibility of his talent, and quality of his diction ("l'intelligence de son jeu, la souplesse de son talent et l'excellence de sa diction"). Upon leaving the Comédie-Française his stage work was found at the Variétés in Guitry plays, then as Marius in the Pagnol trilogy.

During the 1920s, Fresnay appeared in many popular stage productions. In 1927 Marion Fawcett was producing plays at the Theatre Royal in Huddersfield in her "International Masterpieces Seasons". She produced a play in which Fresnay delivered his lines in French. The play was "Game As He Played It".

He took the title role of Marcel Pagnol's Marius (1929), which ran for over 500 performances, also taking this role in the 1931 film adaptation of the play. He reprised the character in the next two parts of Marcel Pagnol's Marseilles Trilogy, Fanny (1932) and César (1936).

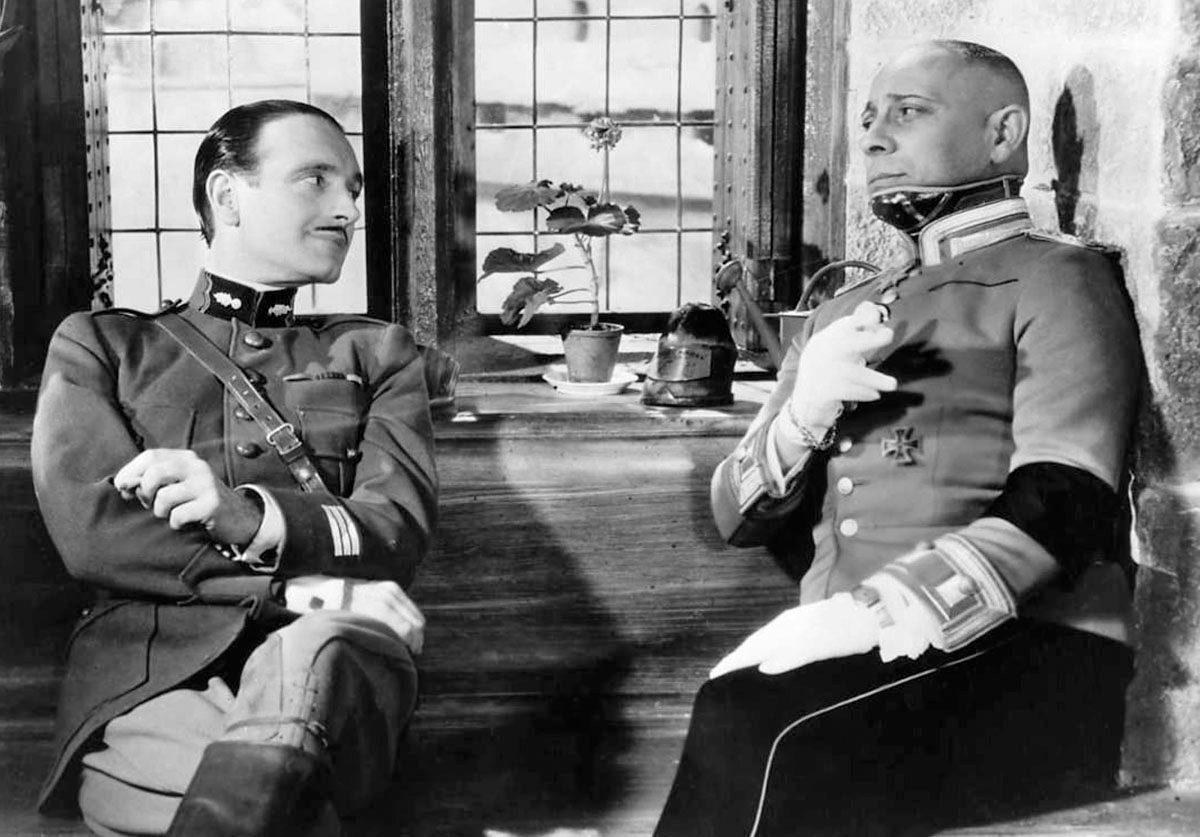
Fresnay (left) with Erich von Stroheim in the 1937 film La Grande Illusion

In 1932, Yvonne Printemps's marriage to Sacha Guitry broke up, and Printemps became Fresnay's personal and professional partner.

He took over the lead role in Noël Coward's Conversation Piece when the author moved on in April 1934. Fresnay won excellent reviews, and his stage partnership with Printemps was greatly admired. In the same year Printemps and Fresnay had a screen hit in Abel Gance's La dame aux camélias. Between then and 1951 they appeared together in eight films.

In 1934, he appeared briefly in Alfred Hitchcock's first version of The Man Who Knew Too Much. In 1937, he portrayed the aristocratic French military officer Captain de Boeldieu in Jean Renoir's masterpiece La Grande Illusion.

In 1947, he played Vincent de Paul in Monsieur Vincent, for which he won the Volpi Cup for Best Actor at the Venice Film Festival. His portrayal was described in Sight and Sound as "one of the most perfect pieces of work to be seen for many years in any clime". He also portrayed Nobel Peace Prize laureate Albert Schweitzer in Il est minuit, Docteur Schweitzer (1952). La Valse de Paris gave Fresnay the chance to play in a "stylised musical" as a "delightful, lightly caricatured portrayal of Offenbach", alongside Printemps.

== Soldier ==
A soldier in the French Army during World War I, he returned to his career a hero. However, under the German occupation of World War II, he worked for the Franco-German film company Continental, making Henri-Georges Clouzot's Le Corbeau and other films.

Fresnay's appearances in films produced by German film company Continental during the war, especially Le Corbeau, caused his summons, brief imprisonment, and condemnation by a purge tribunal after the liberation. Because of the parallels between the poison-pen letters in Le Corbeau (in which he played the leading role) and the widespread letters of denunciation in Occupied France, Clouzot's film was banned in France for more than 20 years.

== Later years ==
Printemps and Fresnay starred in Oscar Straus's Drei Walzer, given in French as Trois valses on the Parisian stage and on film (Les trois valses). The critic Richard Traubner commented in 2006 that because of the performances of Printemps and Fresnay the film still "hangs over anyone who dares revive the operetta on stage".

As well as theatre work covering 130 plays, he appeared in over 70 films, some still classics, and at the end of his life on television such as Le Neveu de Rameau.

In 1954, he published his memoirs, Je suis comédien (Eng. I am an actor). Fresnay continued to perform regularly in film and on stage through to the 1960s. In the 1970s, he appeared in a few films for television. From then on, he lived with the French actress and singer Yvonne Printemps for the rest of his life, co-directing the Théâtre de la Michodière in Paris with her until his death in 1975.

== Death ==
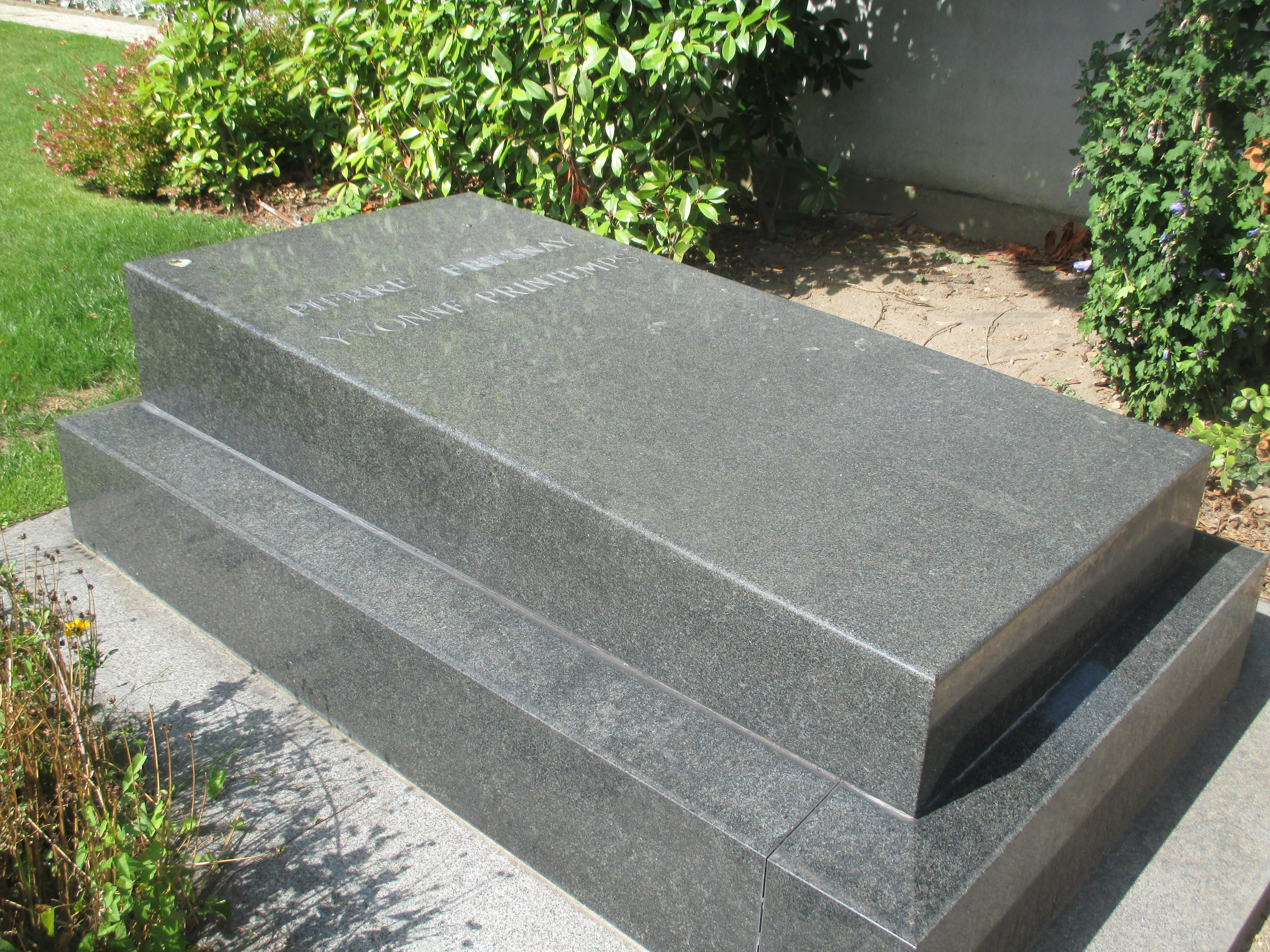
The grave of Fresnay and his companion Yvonne Printemps at the cemetery in Neuilly-sur-Seine

He died of respiratory problems, aged 77, on 9 January 1975, at Neuilly-sur-Seine and he is interred alongside Printemps in the local cemetery. In his autobiography (My Name Escapes Me), Alec Guinness states that Fresnay was his favourite actor.

== Other ==
Asked how to say his name, he told The Literary Digest "I think my name is to be pronounced fray-nay. At least, it is the way I pronounce it." (Charles Earle Funk, What's the Name, Please?, Funk & Wagnalls, 1936).

== Filmography ==
Year	Title	Role	Director	Notes
1916	Quand même		Henri Pouctal	
1921	L'essor		Charles Burguet	
1922	The Black Diamond	Bouvier	André Hugon	
1922	The Mysteries of Paris	François Germain	Charles Burguet	
1924	Le petit Jacques	Paul Laverdac	Georges Lannes	
1924	La mendiante de Saint-Sulpice		Charles Burguet	
1924	Les premières armes de Rocambole	Jean Robert	Charles Maudru	
1924	The Loves of Rocambole	Jean Robert	Charles Maudru	
1929	A Foolish Maiden	Gaston de Charance	Luitz-Morat	
1930	Ça aussi!... c'est Paris		Antoine Mourre	
1931	Marius	Marius Olivier, César's son	Alexander Korda	
1932	Fanny	Marius Olivier, César's son	Marc Allégret	
1933	Âme de clown	Jack	Marc Didier	
1934	The Lady of the Camellias	Armand Duval	Fernand Rivers and Abel Gance	
1934	The Man Who Knew Too Much	Louis Bernard	Alfred Hitchcock	
1935	Kœnigsmark	Raoul Vignerte, French teacher	Maurice Tourneur	
1936	Le roman d'un jeune homme pauvre	Maxime Hauterive de Champcey	Abel Gance	
1936	Under Western Eyes	Razumov	Marc Allégret	
1936	César	Marius Olivier, César's son	Marcel Pagnol	
1937	Street of Shadows	Captain Georges Carrère	Georg Wilhelm Pabst	
1937	La Grande Illusion	Captain Boeldieu	Jean Renoir	
1937	The Silent Battle	Bordier	Pierre Billon	
1938	The Puritan	Le commissaire Lavan	Jeff Musso	
1938	Chéri-Bibi	Francis dit Chéri-Bibi	Léon Mathot	
1938	Alert in the Mediterranean	Le commandant Lestailleur	Léo Joannon	
1938	Adrienne Lecouvreur	Maurice de Saxe	Marcel L'Herbier	
1938	Three Waltzes	Octave, Philippe et Gérard de Chalencey	Ludwig Berger	
1939	The Phantom Carriage	David Holm	Julien Duvivier	
1941	Le Duel	Father Daniel Maurey	Pierre Fresnay himself	
1941	The Last of the Six	Le commissaire Wensceslas Voroboevitch dit Monsieur Wens	Georges Lacombe	
1941	The Chain Breaker	Marcus	Jacques Daniel-Norman	
1942	The Strangers in the House	Le narrateur	Henri Decoin	Uncredited
1942	The Newspaper Falls at Five O'Clock	Le reporter Pierre Rabaud	Georges Lacombe	
1942	The Murderer Lives at Number 21	Monsieur Wens	Henri-Georges Clouzot	
1943	La Main du diable	Roland Brissot	Maurice Tourneur	
1943	The Stairs Without End	Pierre	Georges Lacombe	
1943	I Am with You	François	Henri Decoin	
1943	Le Corbeau	Doctor Rémy Germain	Henri-Georges Clouzot	
1944	Traveling Light	Gaston	Jean Anouilh	
1946	The Devil's Daughter	Ludovic Mercier / Saget	Henri Decoin	
1946	The Visitor	Sauval	Jean Dréville	
1947	Monsieur Vincent	Vincent de Paul	Maurice Cloche	
1948	Convicted	Jean Séverac	Georges Lacombe	
1948	Combourg, visage de pierre	François-René de Chateaubriand	Jacques de Casembroot	Voice
1949	Barry	Le père Théotime	Richard Pottier	
1949	At the Grand Balcony	Gilbert Carbot	Henri Decoin	
1949	Vient de paraître	Moscat	Jacques Houssin	
1950	The Paris Waltz	Jacques Offenbach	Marcel Achard	
1950	Justice Is Done	Narrator	André Cayatte	Uncredited
1950	God Needs Men	Thomas Gourvennec	Jean Delannoy	
1951	Monsieur Fabre	Jean-Henri Fabre	Henri Diamant-Berger	
1951	The Voyage to America	Gaston Fournier	Henri Lavorel	
1951	Great Man	Le professeur Louis Delage	Yves Ciampi	
1952	It Is Midnight, Doctor Schweitzer	Le docteur Albert Schweitzer	André Haguet	
1953	Napoleon Road	Édouard Martel	Jean Delannoy	
1954	The Unfrocked One	Maurice Morand	Léo Joannon	
1955	The Fugitives	Lt Pierre Keller	Jean-Paul Le Chanois	
1955	The Aristocrats	Marquis de Maubrun	Denys de La Patellière	
1956	If All the Guys in the World	Narrator	Christian Jaque	Voice, Uncredited
1956	L'homme aux clefs d'or	Antoine Fournier	Léo Joannon	
1956	The Hunchback of Notre Dame	Narrator	Jean Delannoy	
1957	The Ostrich Has Two Eggs	Hippolyte Barjus	Denys de La Patellière	
1957	A Bomb for a Dictator	Luis Vargas	Alex Joffé	
1958	And Your Sister?	Bastien du Boccage	Maurice Delbez	
1958	Le insaziabili	Joseph Andrieu	Léo Joannon	
1959	Les affreux	César Dandieu	Marc Allégret	
1960	La 1000eme fenêtre	Armand Vallin	Robert Ménégoz	
1960	The Old Guard	Baptiste Talon	Gilles Grangier	
1969	Dieu a choisi Paris	Récitant	Philippe Arthuys	Voice
