= César (film) =

- 1936 French poster showing Fanny and Marius
- Directed by: Marcel Pagnol
- Written by: Marcel Pagnol
- Produced by: Marcel Pagnol
- Starring: Raimu; Pierre Fresnay; Fernand Charpin; Orane Demazis; André Fouché
- Cinematography: Willy Faktorovitch
- Edited by: Suzanne de Troeye
- Music by: Vincent Scotto
- Release date: 27 October 1936
- Running time: 141 min
- Country: France
- Language: French

César is a 1936 French romantic drama film written and directed by Marcel Pagnol and starring Raimu, Pierre Fresnay, Fernand Charpin, Orane Demazis, and André Fouché. It is the final film in Pagnol's Marseille Trilogy, which began with Marius (1931) and continued with Fanny (1932). Unlike the other two films in the trilogy, César was not based on a play by Pagnol, but was written directly as a film script. In 1946, Pagnol adapted the script for the film as a stage play.

== Plot ==
Honoré Panisse is dying, cheerfully, with friends, wife, and son at his side. He confesses to the priest in front of his friends and insists the doctor be truthful about his prognosis. However, he cannot bring himself to tell Césariot, his twenty-year-old son, that the young man's biological father is Marius, the absent son of César (Panisse's old friend and Césariot's godfather). After Panisse's funeral, Fanny, Panisse's widow and Césariot's mother, gives in to the priest's pressure to make the truth known, and tells Césariot about the relationship she had with Marius before she married Panisse.

A gobsmacked Césariot tells Fanny that he is going to visit a friend from school, but really goes to see Marius, who is now a car mechanic in Toulon. Posing as a journalist, Césariot spends some time with Marius, but he returns home after some of Marius' friends—to play a joke on the naive youth—tell him that they and Marius are involved in burglary and drug trafficking. A chance encounter in Marseille later alerts Marius' business partner to the relationship between Marius and Césariot, and he comes clean to Césariot about the joke.

Césariot finds Marius and reveals his true identity. He brings Marius to see Fanny and César, and Marius chastises them for ruining all of their lives in the name of propriety and believing negative rumors that they had heard about Marius over the years. Marius then tells Césariot that Césariot knows where to find him and leaves.

A short time later, just after Césariot has left Marseille to start a job elsewhere, Marius and Fanny meet privately. They both admit their continuing love for each other, but Marius says he feels uncomfortable around Fanny now, since she is a different person after spending so long living so comfortably. He says he needs time to think and leaves, but his car does not start, as César has followed the couple to their meeting and tinkered with the engine of Marius' car. César says Marius is being silly and tells Marius and Fanny that they do not have to worry about what Césariot will think, who has apparently told César that, after considering the alternatives, he would prefer his parents to get together. Having delivered his message, César leaves the (now not-so-young) lovers to restart their conversation, and Marius and Fanny walk off together, arm in arm.

== Cast ==
- Raimu as César Ollivier
- Pierre Fresnay as Marius Ollivier
- Fernand Charpin as Honoré Panisse
- Orane Demazis as Fanny Panisse (née Cabanis)
- Paul Dullac as Félix Escartefigue
- Robert Vattier as Albert Brun
- Marcel Maupi as Innocent Mangiapan
- Édouard Delmont as Dr. Félicien Venelle
- Milly Mathis as Claudine Foulon, Fanny's aunt
- Thommeray as Elzéar Bonnegrâce, the parish priest
- Robert Bassac as Pierre Dromard, Césariot's school friend
- Alida Rouffe as Honorine Cabanis
- Charblay as Henri, the owner of the bar in Toulon
- Doumel as Fernand, Marius' business partner
- André Fouché as Césariot Panisse

== Cast recordings ==
An audio cast recording of select scenes from the film, with minor rewrites, was made in Paris on 27 and 28 May 1937 for the French subsidiary of Columbia Records by part of the main cast (Raimu, Charpin, Dullac, Fouché); Brun was played by Auguste Mourriès, who had played the role in the cast recording for Fanny and played Escartefigue in the film Fanny, and the priest was played by Édouard Delmont, who played Dr. Venelle in the film. The cast recording included Escartefigue's eulogy at Panisse's funeral, a scene not included in the final version of the film. It was later re-issued on compact disc.

No.	Title	Length
1.	"Panisse est cuit" (Panisse is Done)	05:45
2.	"La confession de Panisse" (Panisse’s Confession)	05:30
3.	"L’enterrement" (The Funeral)	01:33
4.	"La partie de cartes" (The Card Game)	04:03
5.	"Grand-père" (Granddad)	11:43
6.	"Vous dites que je suis coléreux" (You’re Saying I Have a Temper)	03:05
7.	"Le secret de Césariot" (Césariot’s Secret)	03:04
8.	"Les adieux de Césariot" (Césariot’s Farewell)	05:34

In 1962, Pagnol’s distribution company, the Compagnie méditerranéenne de films, released the film soundtrack on disc, interspersed with narrative comments and descriptions spoken by Pagnol. In complement came recollections about the production of the film, which were later published as part of the augmented edition of his 1934 essay French: Cinématurgie de Paris. The soundtrack album was re-issued on CD by Frémeaux & Associés, in their “Librairie sonore” series.

== In popular culture ==
- Alice Waters, the famed restaurateur and founder of California cuisine, was so taken by the Marseille Trilogy that she named her Berkeley restaurant "Chez Panisse". The café upstairs from the restaurant is decorated with posters from the films Marius, Fanny, and César.
- The main characters of the Marseille Trilogy make a cameo appearance in the Asterix comic book Asterix and the Banquet.

== See also ==
- Fanny (1961) – a non-musical American film based on the 1954 stage musical adaptation of the Marseille Trilogy
