= Fernand Charpin =

French actor (1887–1944)

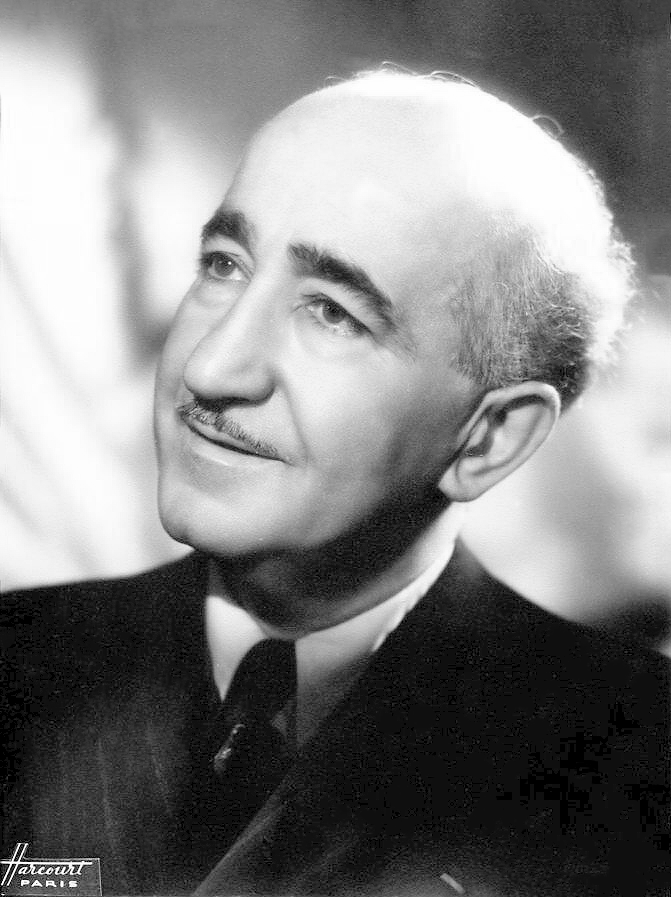
- Born: 30 May 1887; Marseille, France
- Died: 6 November 1944 (aged 57); Paris, France
- Occupation: Actor
- Years active: 1931–1943

Fernand Charpin (30 May 1887 – 6 November 1944) was a French actor. He is known for his role as Honoré Panisse in Marcel Pagnol's Marseille trilogy, beginning with Marius in 1931.

== Selected filmography ==
- Marius (1931)
- Fanny (1932)
- Court Waltzes (1933)
- Chotard and Company (1933)
- The Barber of Seville (1933)
- Paprika (1933)
- Sapho (1934)
- Tartarin of Tarascon (1934)
- Three Sailors (1934)
- The Path to Happiness (1934)
- Beautiful Days (1935)
- Honeymoon (1935)
- Happy Arenas (1935)
- César (1936)
- Michel Strogoff (1936)
- They Were Five (1936)
- Pépé le Moko (1937)
- Balthazar (1937)
- Ignace (1937)
- The Lady from Vittel (1937)
- The Dark Angels (1937)
- The Club of Aristocrats (1937)
- The Baker's Wife (1938)
- Troubled Heart (1938)
- The Little Thing (1938)
- In the Sun of Marseille (1938)
- The Rebel (1938)
- The Two Schemers (1938)
- Whirlwind of Paris (1939)
- My Aunt the Dictator (1939)
- The Path of Honour (1939)
- The Mayor's Dilemma (1939)
- Education of a Prince (1938)
- Berlingot and Company (1939)
- The Marvelous Night (1940)
- Strange Suzy (1941)
- The Italian Straw Hat (1941)
- The Blue Veil (1942)
- The Secret of Madame Clapain (1943)
- The White Truck (1943)
- Mistral (1943)
- After the Storm (1943)
- The Island of Love (1944)
- La Fiancée des ténèbres (1945)
- Majestic Hotel Cellars (1945)
- The Last Penny (1946)
