= The Black Whale =

1934 film directed by Fritz Wendhausen

- German film poster
- German: Der schwarze Walfisch
- Directed by: Fritz Wendhausen
- Written by: Fritz Wendhausen
- Based on: Fanny by Marcel Pagnol
- Produced by: Willi Wolff
- Starring: Emil Jannings; Angela Salloker; Max Gülstorff
- Cinematography: Emil Schünemann
- Edited by: W. L. Bagier; Alwin Elling
- Music by: Walter Kollo
- Production company: Riton
- Release date: 2 March 1934
- Running time: 98 minutes
- Country: Germany
- Language: German

The Black Whale (German: Der schwarze Walfisch) is a 1934 German drama film directed by Fritz Wendhausen and starring Emil Jannings, Angela Salloker and Max Gülstorff. It is based on the 1931 play Fanny by Marcel Pagnol.

The film's sets were designed by the art directors Otto Erdmann and Hans Sohnle. It was shot at the Halensee Studios in Berlin. Because the film had a Jewish producer, it had some production issues due to the takeover of the Nazi Party. It premiered at the Ufa-Palast am Zoo.

== Plot ==
The Black Whale is the German version of Marcel Pagnol's masterpiece Fanny, the second part of his Marseille trilogy. Many years ago, Peter Petersen's son Martin had abandoned his pregnant girlfriend Fanny to chase adventures on the sea. Peter Petersen had then married Fanny with his friend Pannies, who adopted and raised the baby as his own. Martin returns after several years, determined to get Fanny and his child back.

== Cast ==
- Emil Jannings as Peter Petersen
- Angela Salloker as Fanny Jürgens
- Max Gülstorff as Pannies
- Franz Nicklisch as Martin Petersen
- Albert Florath as Captain
- Reinhold Gerstenberg as postman
- Käthe Haack as Josefine
- Margarete Kupfer as Mrs. Jürgens
- Karl Platen as old skipper
- Hans Richter as stoker boy
- Willi Schaeffers as Bruns
