= Raimu =

French actor-singer

Jules Auguste Muraire
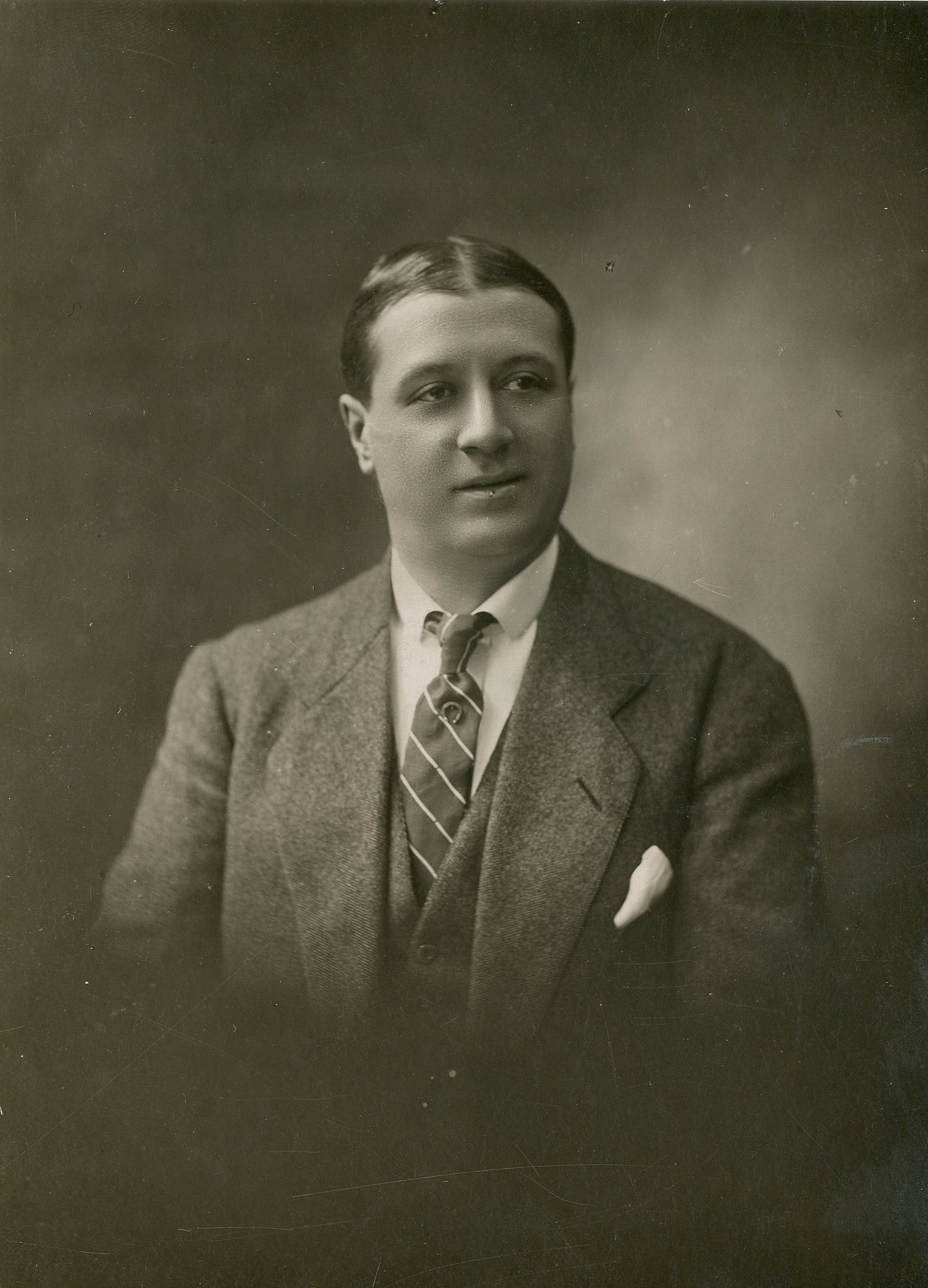
- Studio Henri Manuel, 1920
- Born: Jules Auguste Muraire; 18 December 1883; Toulon, France
- Died: 20 September 1946 (aged 62); Neuilly-sur-Seine, Paris, France
- Resting place: Toulon, France
- Other name: Raimu
- Occupations: Actor; Singer
- Years active: 1916–1943
- Spouse: Esther Metayer (m. 1936)
- Children: 1
- Awards: Honorary César 1983

Jules Auguste Muraire (18 December 1883 – 20 September 1946), whose stage name was Raimu, was a French actor. He is most famous for playing César in the 'Marseilles trilogy' (Marius, Fanny and César).

== Life and career ==
Born in Toulon in the Var department, Muraire made his stage debut there in 1899. After coming to the attention of the great music hall star Félix Mayol who was also from Toulon, in 1908 he was given a chance to work as a secondary act in the Paris theatre scene. He worked primarily in comedy. In 1916, writer/director Sacha Guitry gave him significant parts in productions at the Folies Bergère and other major venues. In addition to his appearances on stage, Raimu also developed a successful career in films, sometimes under the name Jules Raimu.

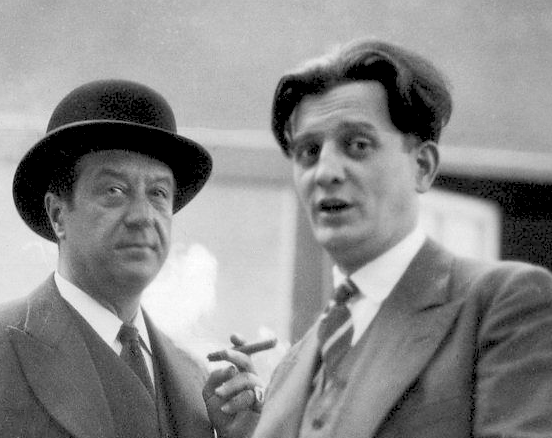
Raimu and Marcel Pagnol

He starred in the premiere of André Messager's operetta Coups de roulis in 1928. The following year, already a leading actor, he gained wide acclaim for his starring role in the stage production of the Marcel Pagnol play Marius. Reluctantly, owing to his disappointment with his first film role many years earlier, he agreed to act in Guitry's film Le Blanc et le Noir and then reprised his Marius role on film a year later. By his late forties Raimu had become one of his country's most respected actors, and was considered the ultimate actor by Alec Guinness, Marlene Dietrich, Rod Steiger and Orson Welles.

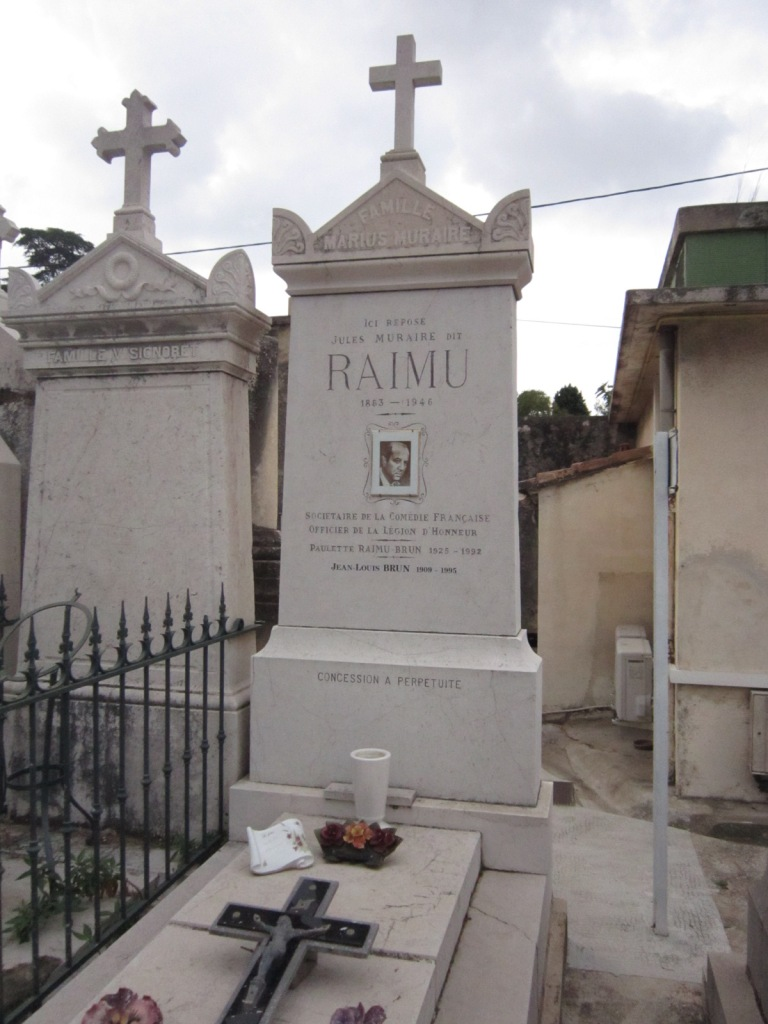
Grave in Toulon

== Family ==
He married Esther Metayer (1905-1977) in 1936. He had a daughter, Paulette Brun (1925-1992).

== Death ==
Raimu died of a heart attack on 20 September 1946, brought on by complications with anesthesia after a relatively minor leg operation, in the American Hospital of Paris in Neuilly-sur-Seine, while he was asleep.

== Legacy ==
He was interred in the cemetery of Toulon, where the Cinéma Raimu Toulon has been named in his honor.

In 1961, the government of France honored him with his image on a postage stamp. A small museum created by his granddaughter Isabelle Nohain exists in the town of Cogolin in the Var department in France.

== Partial filmography ==
- Black and White (1931) - Marcel Desnoyers
- Marius (1931) - César Olivier
- Mam'zelle Nitouche (1931) - Célestin / Floridor
- The Chocolate Girl (1932) - Félicien Bédarride
- Fun in the Barracks (1932) - Le capitaine Hurluret
- Fanny (1932) - César
- Theodore and Company (1933) - Clodomir
- Charlemagne (1933) - Charlemagne
- Ces messieurs de la Santé (1934) - Gédéon Tafard
- Minuit, place Pigalle (1934) - Monsieur Prosper
- Tartarin of Tarascon (1934) - Tartarin
- I Have an Idea (1934) - Aubrey
- School for Coquettes (1935) - Labaume
- Gaspard de Besse (1935) - Samplan
- The Secret of Polichinelle (1936) - M. Jouvenel
- The Brighton Twins (1936) - Alfred Beaugérard et les deux fils Achille
- The King (1936) - M. Bourdier - un riche industriel et sénateur qui reçoit le Roi
- César (1936) - César Ollivier
- Let's Make a Dream (1936) - Le mari
- Vous n'avez rien à déclarer? (1937) - Jules Papillot
- The Pearls of the Crown (1937) - L'industriel du midi
- Chaste Susanne (1937) - Monsieur des Aubrays
- Life Dances On (1937) - Francois Patusset
- Gribouille (1937) - Camille Morestan
- The Kings of Sport (1937) - Jules de l'Estaque
- Le fauteuil 47 (1937) - Juste Auguste Theillard
- The Strange Monsieur Victor (1938) - Victor Agardanne
- The New Rich (1938) - Legendre
- The Baker's Wife (1938) - Aimable Castanier
- Heroes of the Marne (1938) - Bernard Lefrançois
- Cocoanut (1939) - Loulou Barbentane
- Monsieur Brotonneau (1939) - M. Brotonneau
- Ultima giovinezza (1939) - Cesare
- Second Childhood (1939) - Georges
- The Man Who Seeks the Truth (1940) - Jean Vernet
- La Fille du puisatier (1940) - Pascal Amoretti
- Le duel (1941) - le Père Bolène
- Parade en sept nuits (1941) - Le curé Maffre - curé des Baux
- Les Inconnus dans la maison (1942) - Maître Hector Loursat
- L'Arlésienne (1942) - Marc
- Monsieur La Souris (1942) - Monsieur La Souris
- The Benefactor (1942) - Monsieur Moulinet
- Les petits riens (1942) - Charpillon
- Untel père et fils (1943) - L'oncle Jules Froment
- Le Colonel Chabert (1943) - Le colonel Hyacinthe Chabert
- Les gueux au paradis (1946) - Boule
- The Eternal Husband (1946) - Nicolas Trousotsky (final film role)
- Chantons sous l'Occupation (1976) - (archive footage)
