= Jean-Louis Barrault =

French actor and director (1910–1994)

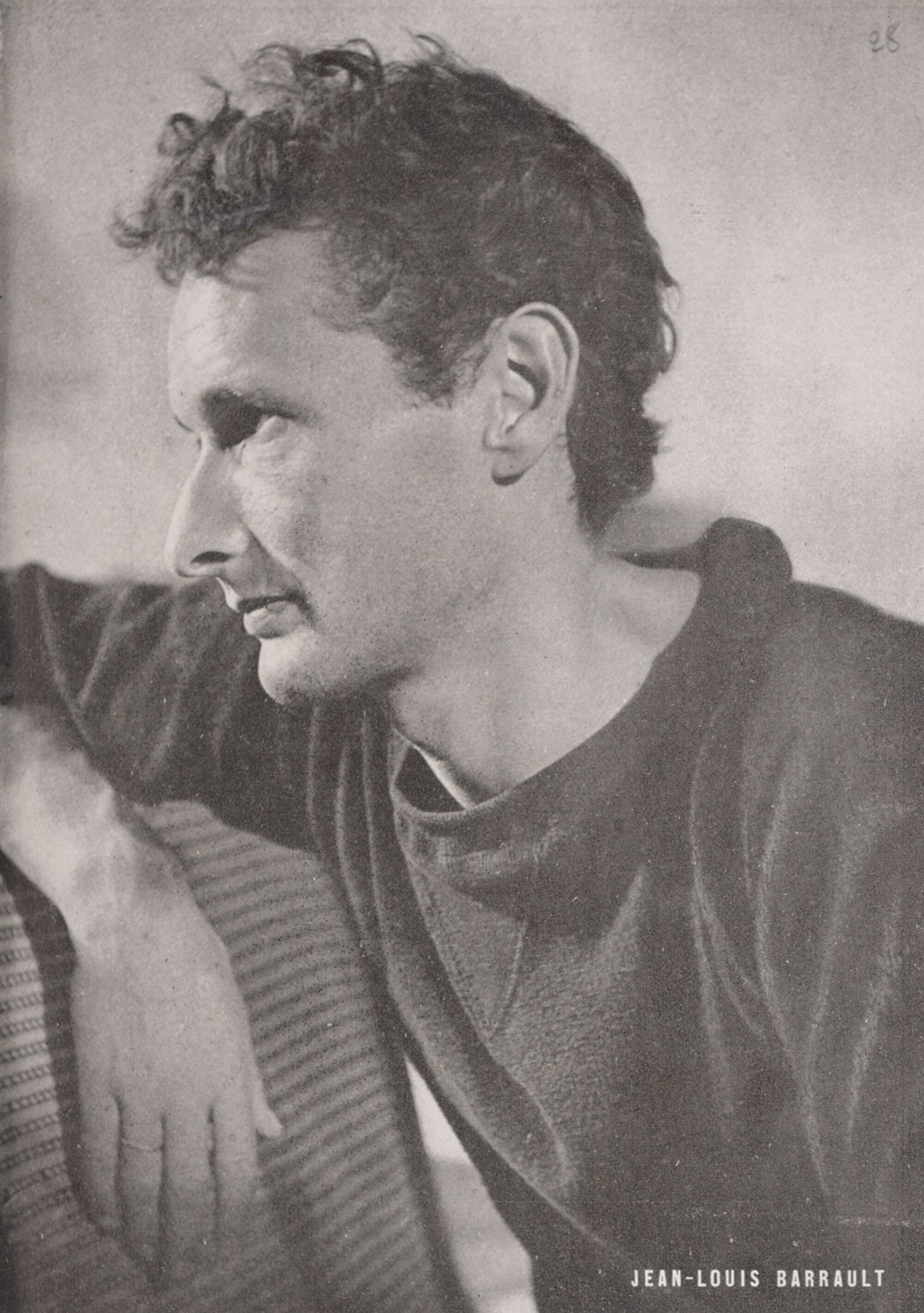
- Barrault in 1948
- Born: 8 September 1910; Le Vésinet, France
- Died: 22 January 1994 (aged 83); Paris, France
- Spouse: Madeleine Renaud (m. 1940)

Jean-Louis Bernard Barrault (French: [ʒɑ̃ lwi bɛʁnaʁ baʁo]; 8 September 1910 – 22 January 1994) was a French actor, director and mime artist who worked on both screen and stage.

== Biography ==
Barrault was born in Le Vésinet in France in 1910. His father was "a Burgundian pharmacist who died in the First World War."^{:87} He studied at the Collége Chaptal until 1930, when he began his studies at the École du Louvre.^{:87}

=== Theatre ===
From 1931 to 1935 Barrault studied and acted at Charles Dullin's L'Atelier.^{:32} His first performance was a small role in Ben Jonson's Volpone. At the time, Barrault was unable to afford rent and Dullin allowed him to sleep in the theatre on Volpone's bed.^{:16} It was at L'Atelier that he first met and studied under Étienne Decroux,^{:41} with whom he would create the pantomime La Vie Primitive in 1931.^{:87}

He was a member of the Comédie-Française from 1942 to 1946, performing lead roles in Shakespeare's Hamlet and Corneille's Le Cid.^{:32} He and his wife, actress Madeleine Renaud, formed their own troupe, Compagnie Renaud-Barrault, in 1946 at Paris' Théâtre Marigny.^{:161} In 1951 he published his memoirs, Reflections on the Theatre.

He was made director of Théâtre de France in 1959, and remained in the role until 1969. In 1971 he was reappointed director of Théâtre des Nations. He retired from the theatre in 1990.^{:87}

=== Film ===
In 1935 he had his first film role in Marc Allégret's Les Beaux Jours.^{:87} He would go on to act in nearly 50 movies over the course of his career. One of his most famous performances was in Marcel Carné's film Les Enfants du Paradis (1945), in which he played the mime Jean-Gaspard Deburau.^{:161}

== Personal life ==
He was the uncle of actress Marie-Christine Barrault and sometime sponsor of Peter Brook. In 1940, he married the actress Madeleine Renaud. They founded a number of theatres together and toured extensively, including in South America.

== Death ==
Barrault died from a heart attack in Paris on 22 January 1994, at the age of 83.^{:87} He is buried with his wife Madeleine in the Passy Cemetery in Paris.

== Filmography ==
Year	Title	Role	Director	Notes
1935	Beautiful Days	René	Marc Allégret	
1936	Mayerling	Student	Anatole Litvak	Uncredited
1936	Under Western Eyes	Haldin	Marc Allégret	
1936	Jenny	Le Dromadaire	Marcel Carné	
1936	Helene	Pierre Régnier	Jean Benoît-Lévy	
1936	Beethoven's Great Love	Karl van Beethoven	Abel Gance	
1937	À nous deux, madame la vie	Paul Briançon	René Guissart and Yves Mirande	
1937	Police mondaine	Scoppa	Michel Bernheim and Christian Chamborant	
1937	Street of Shadows	Le client fou	G. W. Pabst	
1937	The Pearls of the Crown	young Napoleon	Sacha Guitry and Christian-Jaque	
1937	Bizarre, Bizarre	William Kramps	Marcel Carné	
1938	Orage	the African	Marc Allégret	
1938	Le puritain	Francis Ferriter	Jeff Musso	
1938	J'accuse!		Abel Gance	
1938	Mirages	Pierre Bonvais	Alexandre Ryder	
1938	Altitude 3.200	Armand	Jean Benoît-Lévy and Marie Epstein	
1938	La Piste du sud	Olcott	Pierre Billon	
1939	Farinet ou l'or dans la montagne	Maurice Farinet	Max Haufler	
1941	Parade en sept nuits	Lucien Ardouin	Marc Allégret	
1941	Montmartre-sur-Seine	Michel Courtin	Georges Lacombe	
1942	La Symphonie fantastique	Hector Berlioz	Christian-Jaque	
1942	Le Destin fabuleux de Désirée Clary	Napoléon Bonaparte	Sacha Guitry	
1944	L'Ange de la nuit	Jacques Martin	André Berthomieu	
1945	Children of Paradise	Baptiste Deburau	Marcel Carné	
1945	Blind Desire	Michel Kremer	Jean Delannoy	
1947	Le Cocu magnifique	Bruno	E.G. de Meyst	
1948	Man to Men	Henri Dunant	Christian-Jaque	
1950	Vagabonds imaginaires	Le récitant	Alfred Chaumel and Jacques Dufilho	Voice, (segment 'Le bateau ivre')
1950	La Ronde	Robert Kuhlenkampf, the poet	Max Ophüls	
1951	Traité de bave et d'éternité	Himself	Isidore Isou	
1954	Royal Affairs in Versailles	Fénelon	Sacha Guitry	
1959	The Doctor's Horrible Experiment	Doctor Cordelier / Opale	Jean Renoir	TV movie
1960	Le dialogue des Carmélites	Le mime	Philippe Agostini and Raymond Leopold Bruckberger	
1961	Le Miracle des loups	Louis XI of France	André Hunebelle	
1962	The Longest Day	Father Roulland	Ken Annakin	
1964	La grande frousse	Douve	Jean-Pierre Mocky	
1966	Chappaqua	Doctor Benoit	Conrad Rooks	
1977	Jacques Prévert	Himself	Jean Desvilles	
1980	The Lovers' Exile	Introducer	Marty Gross	
1982	That Night in Varennes	Nicolas-Edme Rétif	Ettore Scola	
1988	La Lumière du lac	Le vieux	Francesca Comencini	
