= Travels in the Congo =

Travels in the Congo may refer to:

- Travels in the Congo (book), a travel diary by French author André Gide
- Travels in the Congo (film), a documentary film by Marc Allégret
