= Under Western Eyes (1936 film) =

1936 film

- Directed by: Marc Allégret
- Written by: Joseph Conrad (novel) Hans Wilhelm; Jan Lustig; Jacques Viot; Emeric Pressburger
- Produced by: André Daven
- Starring: Pierre Fresnay; Danièle Parola; Michel Simon
- Cinematography: Michel Kelber
- Edited by: Yvonne Martin; Marguerite Renoir
- Music by: Georges Auric
- Production company: Productions André Daven
- Distributed by: Les Films Osso; L'Alliance Cinématographique Européenne
- Release date: 20 March 1936
- Running time: 95 minutes
- Country: France
- Language: French

Under Western Eyes (French: Razumov: Sous les yeux d'occident) is a 1936 French drama film directed by Marc Allégret and starring Pierre Fresnay, Danièle Parola and Michel Simon. It is an adaptation of Joseph Conrad's 1911 novel Under Western Eyes. It was shot at the Billancourt Studios in Paris. The film's sets were designed by the art director Eugène Lourié.

== Synopsis ==
In nineteenth century Russia a student with ambitions to join the Czarist system unwittingly become embroiled in the assassination of an Imperial official.

== Cast ==
- Pierre Fresnay as Razumov
- Danièle Parola as Nathalie
- Michel Simon as Lespara
- Jacques Copeau as Mikulin
- Pierre Renoir as Un Policier
- Jean-Louis Barrault as Haldin
- Raymond Segard as Kostia
- Vladimir Sokoloff as Le recteur
- Jacques Bousquet as Gregori
- Raymond Aimos
- Michel André
- Romain Bouquet as L'aubergiste
- Auguste Bovério as Babitchev
- Jean Dasté as Georges
- Roger Legris as Le photographe
- Jean Marconi as Herbert
- André Siméon as Le portier
- Madeleine Suffel as La bonne
- Gabriel Gabrio as Nikita
- Roger Karl as Le Ministre
- Michel Audié
- Roger Blin
- Paul Delauzac
- Georges Douking
- Claire Gérard as La logeuse
- Fabien Loris
- François Simon

== Bibliography ==
- Gene M. Moore. Conrad on Film. Cambridge University Press, 2006.
