= Gribouille (film) =

- Directed by: Marc Allégret
- Written by: Marcel Achard (story & dialogue); Jan Lustig (adaptation)
- Produced by: André Daven
- Starring: Raimu; Michèle Morgan
- Cinematography: Georges Benoît; Michel Kelber; Armand Thirard
- Edited by: Yvonne Martin; Marguerite Renoir
- Music by: Georges Auric
- Production companies: Productions André Daven; L'Alliance Cinématographique Européenne (ACE)
- Distributed by: Gray-Film (France); Tri-National Films (USA)
- Release dates: 10 September 1937 (France); 12 January 1939 (U.S.)
- Running time: 86 min
- Country: France
- Language: French

Gribouille (English title: Heart of Paris or The Meddler) is a 1937 French comedy film directed by Marc Allégret, based on story "Gribouille" by Marcel Achard who co-wrote the screenplay with Jan Lustig. The music score is by Georges Auric. The film stars Raimu and Michèle Morgan. It was shot at the Billancourt Studios in Paris, with sets designed by the art director Alexandre Trauner.

It was remade in the U.S. as The Lady in Question (1940) with Brian Aherne, Rita Hayworth and Glenn Ford.

The film marked Michèle Morgan's first major role on the big screen.

== Plot ==
Camille Morestan serves as a jury member at a court in Paris. The attractive Natalie Roguin is accused of murder. Morestan doesn't want to believe she really killed her lover. He succeeds in convincing the other jury members she was innocent. After her acquittal he takes her into his house. While he tries to keep her identity a secret for his family her presence leads to a number of unfortunate incidents.

== Cast ==
- Raimu as Camille Morestan
- Michèle Morgan as Natalie Roguin
- Gilbert Gil as Claude Morestan
- Jean Worms as the president
- Julien Carette as Lurette
- Marcel André as state attorney general
- Jacques Grétillat as the defender
- Jacques Baumer as Marinier
- René Bergeron as Kuhlmann
- Jeanne Provost as Louise Morestan
- Nicolas Rimsky as taxi driver
- Lyne Clevers as Claudette Morel
