= Mata Hari (1985 film) =

- Theatrical release poster
- Directed by: Curtis Harrington
- Written by: Joel Ziskin
- Produced by: Roni Ya'ackov
- Starring: Sylvia Kristel; Oliver Tobias; Christopher Cazenove
- Cinematography: David Gurfinkel
- Edited by: Henry Richardson
- Music by: Wilfred Josephs
- Production company: Golan-Globus
- Distributed by: Cannon Film Distributors
- Release date: September 1, 1985
- Running time: 108 min.
- Country: United States
- Language: English
- Budget: less than $5 million
- Box office: 92,737 admissions (France)

Mata Hari is a 1985 erotic biographical film directed by Curtis Harrington, produced by Golan-Globus and featuring Sylvia Kristel in the title role of exotic dancer Mata Hari, executed for espionage during World War I.

The film portrays Mata Hari as an innocent woman manipulated by the secret services of Germany and France into providing intelligence, at first unwittingly and unwillingly, and later driven by the nonpartisan desire to save lives. Eventually she is cynically sacrificed by the French who are aware of her innocence but believe her execution will boost morale.

== Synopsis ==
The film's convoluted plot is anchored by a fictitious love triangle between Mata Hari and two military intelligence officers, the French Georges Ladoux (Oliver Tobias) and the German Karl von Bayerling (Christopher Cazenove). Ladoux and Bayerling are personal friends but end up on opposing sides of the war, providing ample opportunity to explore the dramatic tension between honor and personal loyalty on the one hand and patriotism and duty to one's country on the other.

Their ethical dilemma is contrasted to the amoral scheming of the main villain, Dr. Elsbeth Schragmüller (invariably known as Fräulein Doktor), a doctor of psychology and leading operative of German intelligence. Mata Hari's efforts to thwart Fräulein Doktor's assassination plot using a concealed bomb are eventually successful but lead her to be captured in deeply compromising circumstances by Ladoux, precipitating her show trial and execution, which Ladoux fruitlessly tries to prevent.

The film ends on a melancholy note with the reconciliation of Ladoux and Bayerling after the war.

== Cast ==
- Sylvia Kristel as Mata Hari
- Christopher Cazenove as Karl Von Bayerling
- Oliver Tobias as Captain Georges Ladoux
- Gaye Brown as Dr. Elsbeth Schragmuller / Fraulein Doktor
- Gottfried John as Wolff
- Michael Anthony as Duke of Montmorency
- Magda Darvas as Duchess of Montmorency
- Anthony Newlands as Baron Joubet
- Brian Badcoe as General Messigny
- Tutte Lemkow as Ybarra
- Taylor Ryan as Contessa
- Toby Rolt as Jean Prevost
- Victor Langley as Colonel Michaud
- Nicholas Selby as Von Jagow
- Malcolm Terris as Von Krohn
- Carlos Sutton as Captain Schlesser
- Odon Gyalog as General Carriere
- Csaba Jakab as Ortega
- Andras Marton as Noriega
- Gabor Nagy as Lieutenant Bouchette
- Ferenc Bencze as Colonel Heissig
- Laszlo Baranyi as Pozsonyi
- Lajos Mezey as Von Falkenberg
- Gabor Reviczky as Giessen
- Emese Balogh as Marquesa de la Cosa Funta
- Istvan Hunyadkurthy as Max
- Janos Bata as Ernst
- Geza Laczkovich as The President of France

== Production ==
The film was the idea of Menahem Golan and was conceived as a vehicle for Sylvia Kristel. It was announced in January 1984.

"I wish I had half her energy in the boudoir," said Kristel of Mata Hari.

Curtis Harrington called the film an "erotic melodrama. The film never was pornographic. The love scenes are explicit. There is nudity."

The director said the movie should have been subtitled The Erotic Adventures With a Spy. "We fictionized events to make the story line work, but essentially it's a very true story. Mata Hari used her erotic power and allure as a woman. She seduced half the men of Europe in her heyday."

The film was entirely shot in Budapest, Hungary. Harrington called Kristel "a very bright and pleasant lady to work with. She's this great sex symbol yet that's not really where her head is at. Being on the set with her is like going to a Sunday school picnic -- she's so circumspect. During the love scenes, there were black velvet curtains and only three people allowed on the set. Some women are so loose and free on the set, they walk around nude. Not Sylvia."

=== Censorship ===
Cannon had to cut the film in order to get the film rated R as opposed to X. They did this without Harrington's involvement. The director said he was "disappointed... I wish I could have been involved in preserving what I felt was the integrity of the film. There were moments I felt were unreasonably cut. I'm not entirely happy with the cut. But (the people at Cannon) don't care what I think."

Harrington said the censors objected to "elaborately staged love scenes. There was an orgy sequence in Spain with frontal nudity of a living statue grouping. That's all cut out. I would have fought to leave that in because it's perfectly harmless, containing nothing of an untoward nature. Very few scenes were cut out in their entirety. In minutes I'd guess that seven were cut out."

== See also ==
- Mata Hari (1927)
- Mata Hari (1931)
- Mata Hari, Agent H21 (1964)
- Fräulein Doktor (1969), a movie about Elsbeth Schragmüller, the Fräulein Doktor of this film
