= Claire Luce =

American actress and dancer (1903–1989)

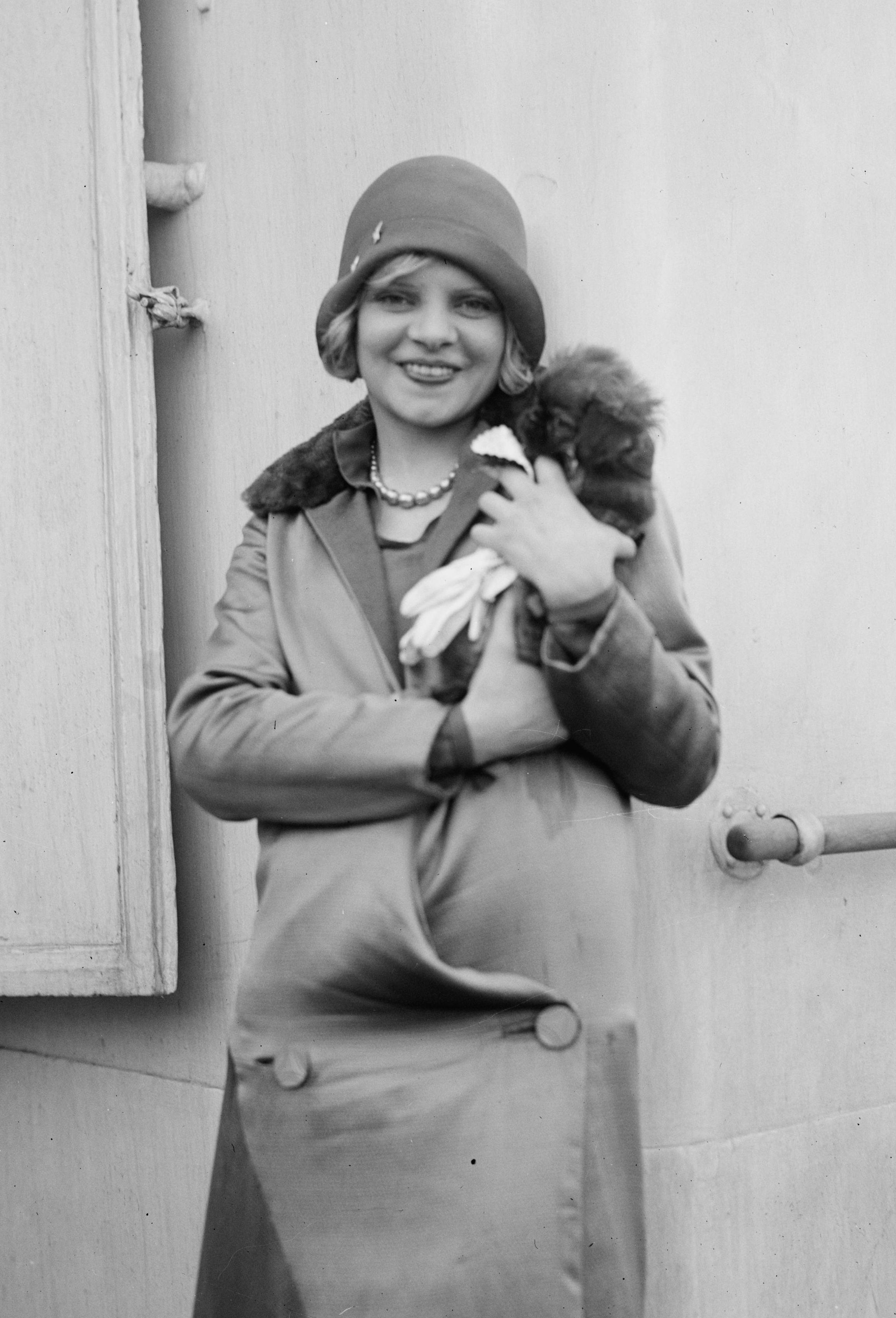
- Born: October 15, 1903; Syracuse, New York, U.S.
- Died: August 31, 1989 (aged 85); New York City, New York, U.S.
- Occupations: Actress; dancer
- Years active: 1930–1955
- Spouse: Clifford W. Smith (m. 1928; div. 1935)

Claire Luce (October 15, 1903 – August 31, 1989) was an American stage and screen actress, dancer and singer. Among her few films were Up the River (1930), directed by John Ford and starring Spencer Tracy and Humphrey Bogart in their feature film debuts (Luce played Bogart's love interest), and Under Secret Orders, the English-language version of G. W. Pabst's French-language feature, Salonique, nid d'espions (1937).

== Early years ==
Luce was born in Syracuse, New York, but she grew up in Rochester in what an article in Silver Screen magazine described as "an atmosphere of discord and squalor". Luce's parents were divorced when she was 13. Florence Colebrook Powers, a friend of Luce's mother, adopted her. Powers was in charge of a dance school, and she introduced Luce to dancing. While still 13, Luce took a job as a "sort of utility employee" at a cafe in Rochester. When she was 15, she ran away with a Russian opera troupe that played in Rochester, becoming a ballerina with the group. Before long, she said, "people in Rochester traced me and had me brought back."

== Career ==
Luce starred in many Broadway plays from 1923 until 1952, including costarring with Fred Astaire in the original musical Gay Divorce (1932). Of her performance in Gay Divorce, the critic Brooks Atkinson wrote, "In the refulgent Claire Luce, Fred Astaire has found a partner who can match him step for step and who flies over the furniture in his company without missing a beat." Unfortunately, during the London run of the play, Luce suffered a serious injury during the "Table Dance" routine—a routine which was reprised in the film—hurting her hip, and this put an end to her stage dancing career.

Astaire tried to get Luce for the film version of Gay Divorce, The Gay Divorcee (1934) but was overruled by the studio, RKO Radio Pictures, which preferred to use their contract player Ginger Rogers. In his autobiography, Astaire credits Luce as the inspiration for his revolutionary "Night and Day" dance routine in the film:

Claire was a beautiful dancer and it was her style that suggested to me the whole pattern of the "Night and Day" dance. This was something entirely different from anything Adele and I had done together. That was what I wanted, an entirely new dancing approach.

Luce recalls her own experience with the chronically insecure Astaire: "I actually felt more sorry for Fred than I did for myself, despite the horrendous schedules of rehearsals that he kept up. He was a very worried man."

She also starred in the Broadway version of Of Mice and Men (1937), written by John Steinbeck and directed by George S. Kaufman.

Luce often appeared on the English stage and, having been seen in Of Mice and Men in London in 1939, stayed in the UK throughout the war years. She played a number of Shakespearean roles during that time and in 1945 scored a big success leading the company at the annual Stratford-on-Avon Memorial Theatre's summer Shakespeare Festival, particularly as Cleopatra in Antony and Cleopatra. Her last appearance in London at that time was as Becky Sharp in an adaptation of Thackeray's novel Vanity Fair at the Comedy Theatre in 1946.

== Personal life ==
Luce married Clifford Warren Smith, first cousin of Dudley Wolfe, in 1928. They were divorced on January 16, 1935. Luce became engaged to John Woodburn Gillan in 1940. He was an RAF pilot who was shot down and killed in 1941.

== Filmography ==
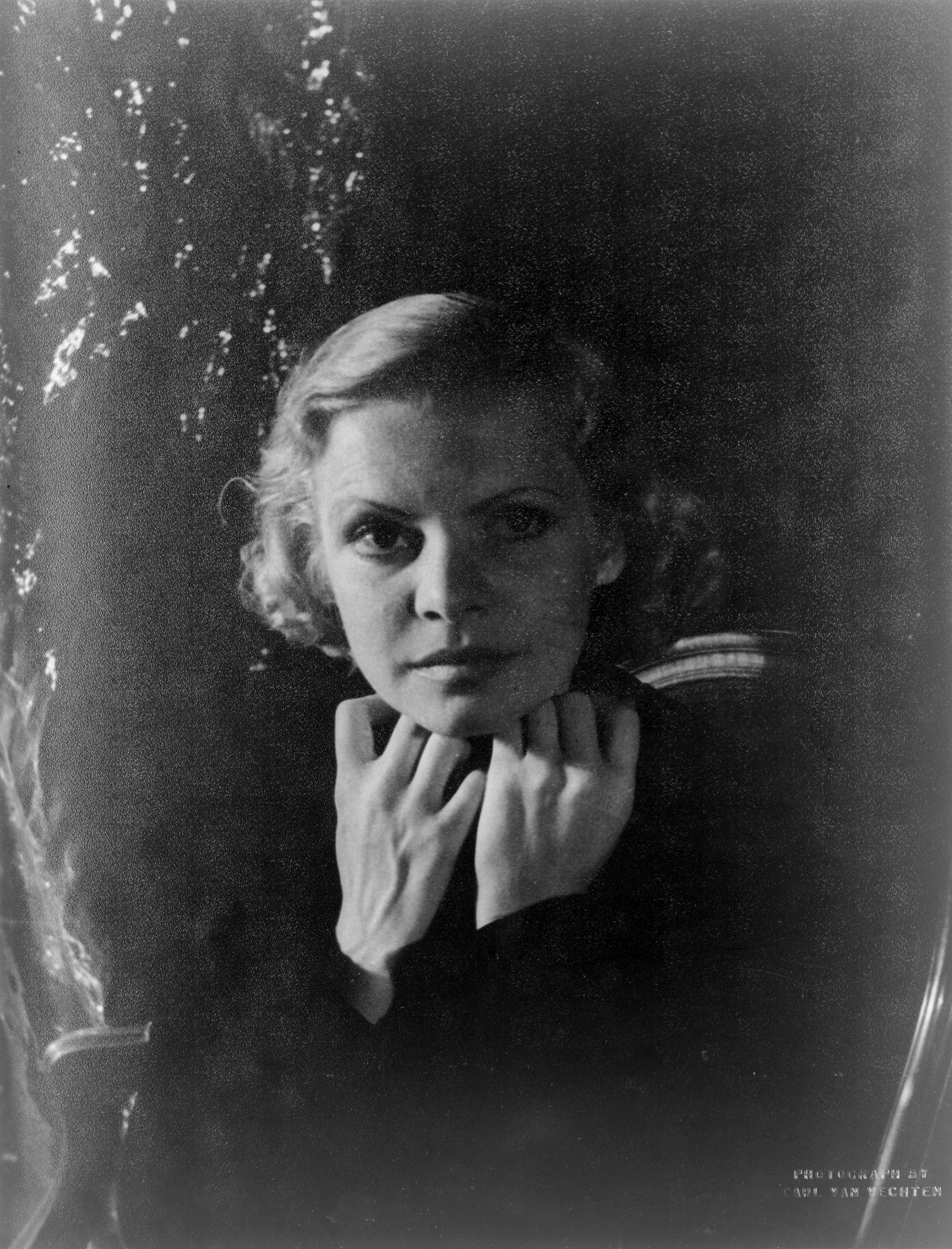
Luce in 1933

- Matinee Theatre (1 episode, 1955)
- Broadway Television Theatre (4 episodes, 1953–1954)
- Lights Out (1 episode, 1952)
- Cameo Theatre (4 episodes, 1951–1952)
- Tales of Tomorrow as Rose (1 episode, 1952)
- The Philco Television Playhouse as Becky Sharp (2 episodes, 1949)
- Over She Goes (1938) as Pamela
- Under Secret Orders (1937) as Gaby, Rene's Girl
- Let's Make a Night of It (1937) as Viola Vanders
- Lazybones (1935) as Kitty McCarthy
- Vintage Wine (1935) as Nina Popinot
- Up the River (1930) as Judy

== Stage ==
- Much Ado About Nothing as Beatrice May 1, 1952 - May 3, 1952
- The Taming of the Shrew as Katharina, Apr 25, 1951 - May 6, 1951
- With a Silk Thread as Rose Raymond, Apr 12, 1950 - Apr 22, 1950
- Portrait in Black as Tanis Talbot, May 14, 1947 - Jul 5, 1947
- Golden Eagle as Mary, Queen of Scots, Jan 29, 1946 - Mar 3, 1946
- Of Mice and Men as Curley's Wife, Nov 23, 1937 - May 1938
- Gay Divorce as Mimi Nov 29, 1932 - Jul 1, 1933
- Society Girl as Judy Gelett, Dec 30, 1931 - Jan 1932
- Scarlet Pages as Nora Mason, Sep 9, 1929 - Nov 1929
- Ziegfeld Follies of 1927 Aug 16, 1927 - Jan 7, 1928
- No Foolin Jun 24, 1926 - Sep 25, 1926
- Music Box Revue [1924] Dec 1, 1924 - May 1925
- Dear Sir as Clair, Sep 23, 1924 - Oct 4, 1924
- Little Jessie James as Claire, Aug 15, 1923 - Jul 19, 1924
