= The Courier of Lyon (1923 film) =

1923 film

- Directed by: Léon Poirier
- Written by: Alfred Delacour (play); Marc Mario; Louis-Mathurin Moreau (play); Paul Siraudin (play); Maxime Vallois
- Starring: Roger Karl; Daniel Mendaille; Émile Saint-Ober
- Cinematography: Bernasseau; Jean Letort
- Production company: Gaumont
- Distributed by: Gaumont
- Release date: 9 March 1923
- Country: France
- Languages: Silent; French intertitles

The Courier of Lyon (French: L'affaire du courrier de Lyon) is a 1923 French historical drama film directed by Léon Poirier and starring Roger Karl, Daniel Mendaille and Émile Saint-Ober.

It is based on the 1796 Courrier de Lyon case, which has been turned into many films including a 1937 French release The Courier of Lyon.

== Main cast ==
- Roger Karl as Joseph Lesurques / Dubosc
- Daniel Mendaille as Le comte de Maupry
- Émile Saint-Ober as Durochat
- Laurence Myrga as Madeleine Brebant
- Suzanne Bianchetti as Clotilde d'Argence
- Blanche Montel as Mme Lesurques
- Marcel Bourdel as Vidal
- Paul Horace as Courriol
- Amy Vautrin as Elise Audebert
- Suzanne Dantès as Claudine Barrière
- Albert Brouett as Campion
- Émile Garandet as Guénot
- Colette Darfeuil
- Georges Deneubourg as L'accusateur public
- André Daven as Audebert

== Bibliography ==
- Klossner, Michael. The Europe of 1500–1815 on Film and Television: A Worldwide Filmography of Over 2550 Works, 1895 Through 2000. McFarland & Company, 2002.
