= Doumel =

French actor and comedian

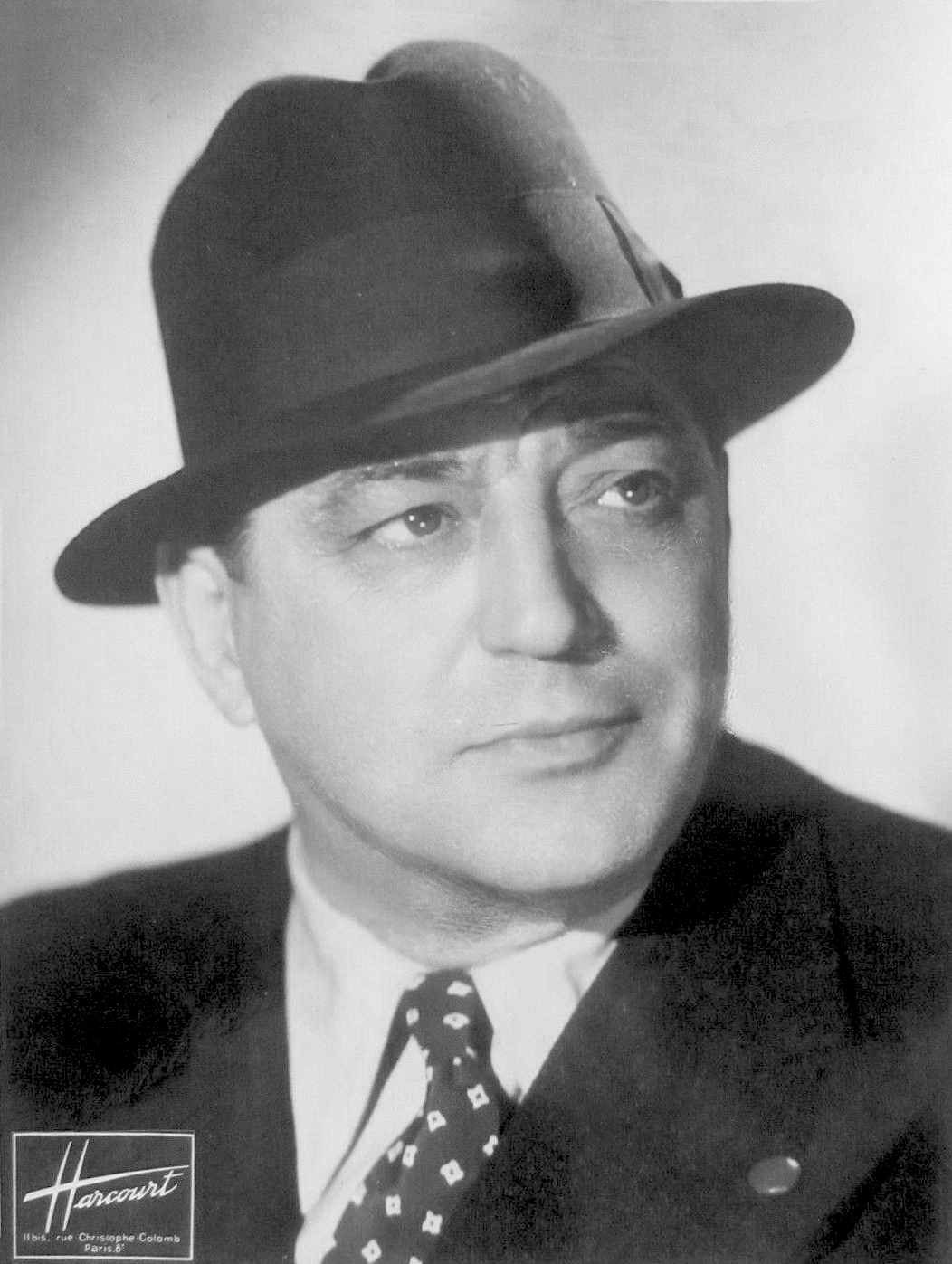
1940 Image of Doumel

Louis Alfred Doumet, known by his stage name of Doumel, (born 2 December 1889 in Marseille; died 23 May 1954 in Reillanne) was a French actor and comedian active in the inter-war years.

== Biography ==
Having moved to Paris thanks to the passion for the southern style, which flowered at the time with operettas and films on the subject, Doumel started to appear in small music halls and theatres, entertaining audiences with comic stories from Marseille, where he met other actors such as Gorlett and Rellys. Louis Doumel also appeared in various operettas and plays and recorded some discs of tall stories and Marseille jokes.

He appeared in his first film in 1926 and continued making films until the Second World War. He is best known for his appearances in César directed Marcel Pagnol, as the ill-advised friend of Marius, and with Fernandel in Ignace directed by Pierre Colombier.

== Filmography ==
- 1926 : L'Inconnue des Six Jours (dir. René Sti)
- 1931 : Atout cœur (dir. Henry Roussell) - Cinema client
- 1931 : Durand contre Durand (dir. Eugène Thiele and Léo Joannon)
- 1931 : Les Galeries Lévy et Cie (also known as Les Galeries Washington and The Levy Department Stores) (dir. André Hugon) - César Patenolle
- 1931 : La belle Madame Moïse (dir. Edmond T. Gréville, short film)
- 1931 : Crime passionnel (dir. Edmond T. Gréville, short film)
- 1932 : La Guerre des sauterelles (dir. Edmond T. Gréville, short film)
- 1933 : The Illustrious Maurin (dir. André Hugon) - Capoufigue
- 1933 : La Prison de Saint-Clothaire (dir. Pierre-Jean Ducis)
- 1934 : Le Prince Jean (dir. Jean de Marguenat) - Café waiter
- 1934 : Deux mille deux cent vingt deux C F 2 (dir. Victor de Fast, short film)
- 1935 : Arènes joyeuses (dir. Karl Anton)
- 1935 : Dora Nelson (dir. René Guissart) - Taxi driver
- 1935 : Juanita (dir. Pierre Caron)
- 1935 : Marseille (dir. Jean Monti and Jean Margueritte, short film)
- 1936 : Aventure à Paris (English title: Adventure in Paris) (dir. Marc Allégret)
- 1936 : Blanchette (dir. Pierre Caron)
- 1936 : César (dir. Marcel Pagnol) - Fernand
- 1936 : Prête-moi ta femme (dir. Maurice Cammage)
- 1936 : Sept hommes, une femme (Eng. title: Seven Men, One Woman) (dir. Yves Mirande)
- 1936 : Une gueule en or (dir. Pierre Colombier) - The Barman
- 1937 : Balthazar (dir. Pierre Colombier)
- 1937 : L'Escadrille de la chance (dir. Max de Vaucorbeil)
- 1937 : Ignace (dir. Pierre Colombier) - The Ajudant-chef
- 1937 : Les Rois du sport (English title: The Kings of Sport) (dir. Pierre Colombier) - Boxing Club President
- 1938 : Alexis, Gentleman Chauffeur (dir. Max de Vaucorbeil) - Napoleon I
- 1938 : Rail Pirates (dir. Christian-Jaque) - Morganty
- 1938 : L'Avion de minuit (dir. Dimitri Kirsanoff)
- 1938 : Ceux de demain / L'enfant de troupe (dir. Adelqui Millar and Georges Pallu)
- 1938 : Le Dompteur (dir. Pierre Colombier)
- 1938 : Lights of Paris (dir. Richard Pottier) - The Manager
- 1938 : The President (dir. Fernand Rivers) - Marius
- 1939 : Grey contre X (dir. Pierre Maudru and Alfred Gragnon)
- 1940 : La Comédie du bonheur (English title: Comedy of Happiness) (dir. Marcel L'Herbier) - Pernamboc
