= La Femme de nulle part =

1922 film by Louis Delluc

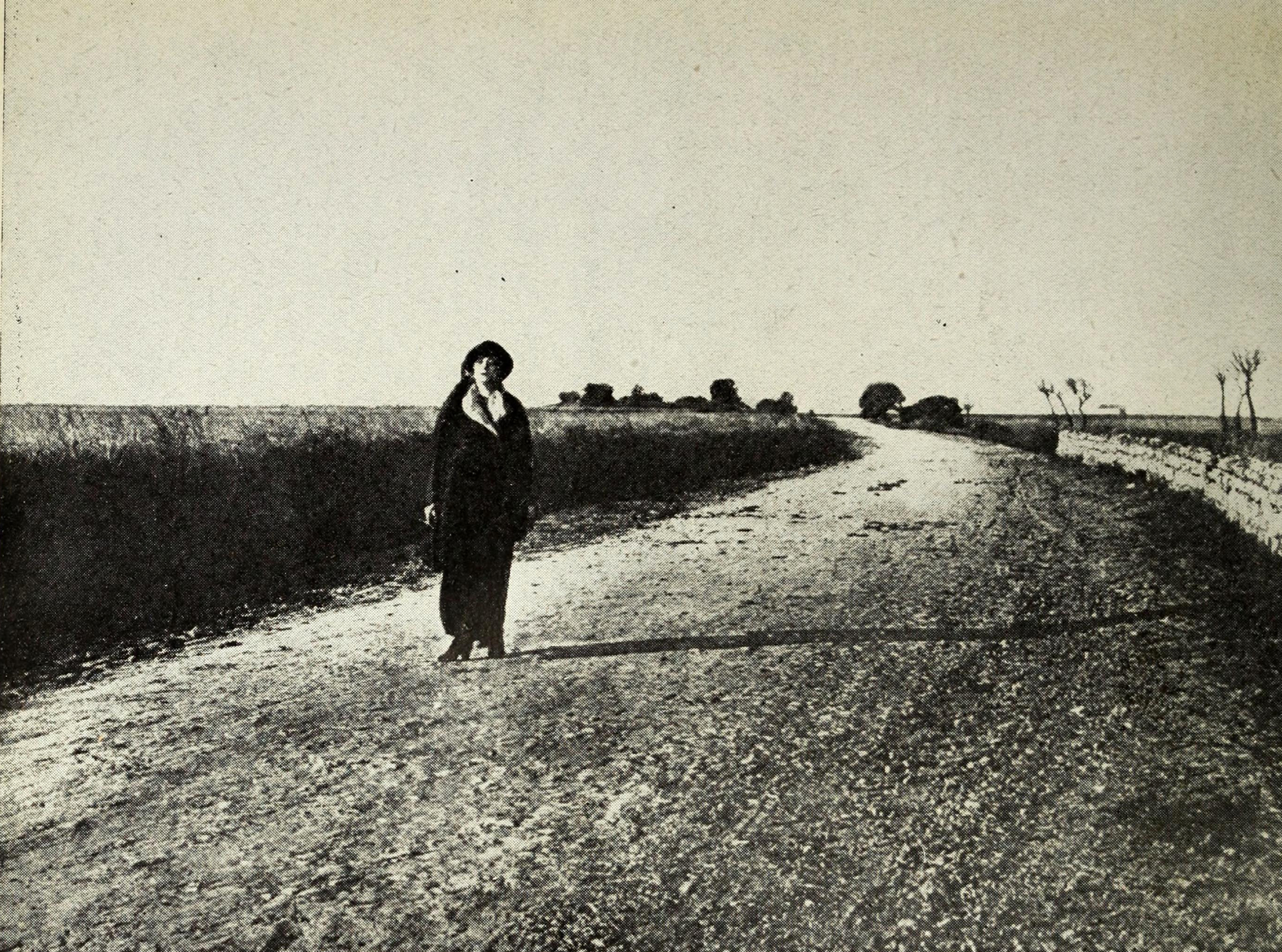
- Directed by: Louis Delluc
- Starring: Ève Francis; Roger Karl
- Music by: Jean Wiener
- Release date: 26 July 1922 (France)
- Running time: 61 minutes
- Country: France
- Language: French

La Femme de nulle part (The Woman from Nowhere) is a 1922 French film directed by Louis Delluc. The screenplay was one of three screenplays published under the title Drames du Cinema in 1923.

== Plot ==
La Femme de nulle part (1922)

In a villa close to Genoa, a man says goodbye to his wife and young son. He is going to spend one day and one night in the city to take leave of a friend embarking on a boat. An older woman arrives, who had lived many years before in that house. She asks for permission to see again the house and the park. The husband invites her to spend the night. While he is upstairs packing, a young man hides a letter under the staircase leading to the house.

Once the husband has left, his wife retrieves the letter, it is a message from her lover insisting that she should leave her house and elope with him. The older woman watches her from the window of her bedroom while she reads the letter. A moment later, she goes to the young woman's bedroom and sees that she is packing. She tells her that she has lived a similar story many years before but that she shouldn't leave because of her child.

During the evening, the older woman wanders in the park, reminiscing about her past love. The young woman meets her lover who tells her he will be waiting for her in his car the following morning and begs her to come with him. In Genoa, the husband wanders aimlessly in the city and ends up in a bar where a woman tries to seduce him but he rejects the temptation.

In the morning, the older woman has changed her mind, she urges the young woman to follow the call of love and convinces her. But the nurse tells the little boy that his mother is leaving. He runs after her and fall on the ground, calling his mother. She cannot resist her son's cries and goes back to the house, just when her husband is coming back. She asks her husband to protect her. The older woman bids them farewell and walks away sadly on the road, realising she is alone in the world.

== Cast ==
- Ève Francis: the unknown woman
- Gine Avril: a young woman
- Roger Karl: the husband
- André Daven: a young man
- Michel Duran: a young man
- Noémie Scize: a nurse

== Reception ==
With hindsight the film has been considered an "early masterpiece of impressionist cinema".
