= Lazybones (1935 film) =

1935 British film directed by Michael Powell

- Opening titles
- Directed by: Michael Powell
- Written by: Ernest Denny (play); Gerard Fairlie
- Produced by: Julius Hagen
- Starring: Claire Luce; Ian Hunter; Sara Allgood
- Cinematography: Arthur Crabtree; Ernest Palmer
- Edited by: Frank Harris; Ralph Kemplen
- Music by: W.L. Trytel
- Distributed by: Radio Pictures
- Release date: 24 June 1935
- Running time: 65 min
- Country: United Kingdom
- Language: English

Lazybones (also known as Lazy Bones) is a 1935 British film directed by Michael Powell and starring Claire Luce, Ian Hunter and Sara Allgood. It was written by Gerard Fairlie adapted from the play by Ernest Denny. It was made as a Quota quickie.

== Plot ==
Sir Reginald Ford, known as "Lazybones", is an idle baronet. He has not a care in the world, although he also has no money. His brother and sister introduce him to Kitty McCarthy, an American heiress, in the hope that he will marry her and so gain access to her fortune which will help out his family.

Kitty's cousin Mike brings Kitty the bad news that she has lost her fortune. Mike is hoping to grab the maps for some Arabian oil fields that are being kept in the house. They are being guarded by two detectives and, in an amusing sub-plot, everybody chases everybody else whilst trying to get the plans.

Back in the main story line, Reginald has discovered that he loves Kitty for herself and does not care that she no longer has a fortune. So they get married, despite the warnings from a pessimistic passer-by who they call in as a witness. Neither of them is broke, but it takes a lot to run the old family pile. Kitty has bought a pub and Reginald and Kitty have some fun serving the regulars there.

Back at the family seat Reginald has found a way to make money from other idle members of the English aristocracy. He sets up a "Home for the Idle Wealthy" and they come to stay (for a fee) and act as butler, gardener, chauffeur etc.

== Cast ==
- Claire Luce as Kitty McCarthy
- Ian Hunter as Sir Reginald Ford
- Sara Allgood as Bridget
- Bernard Nedell as Mike McCarthy
- Michael Shepley as Hildebrand Pope
- Bobbie Comber as Kemp
- Denys Blakelock as Hugh Ford
- Mary Gaskell as Marjory Ford
- Pamela Carne as Lottie Pope
- Harold Warrender as Lord Melton
- Miles Malleson as the pessimist
- Fred Withers as Richards
- Frank Morgan as Tom
- Fewlass Llewellyn as Lord Brockley
- Paul Blake as Viscount Woodland

== Reception ==
The Daily Film Renter wrote: "Despite convolutions and conflicting elements of plot, is fairly entertaining through capable acting of principals, and direction which makes most of indifferent material. A film which seems to suffer from several diverse elements that do not blend effectively into a taut whole."

Picturegoer wrote: "Simple comedy with a transparent plot, but quite well presented and competently acted."
