= That Night (1958 film) =

1958 film

- Directed by: Maurice Cazeneuve
- Written by: Maurice Cazeneuve; Paul Guimard; Henri-François Rey
- Based on: Un silence de mort by Michel Lebrun
- Produced by: André Daven
- Starring: Mylène Demongeot; Maurice Ronet; Jean Servais
- Cinematography: Léonce-Henri Burel
- Edited by: Louisette Hautecoeur
- Music by: Maurice Leroux
- Production company: Soprofilms
- Distributed by: Cinédis
- Release date: 12 September 1958
- Running time: 94 minutes
- Country: France
- Language: French

That Night (French: Cette nuit là...) is a 1958 French crime drama film directed by Maurice Cazeneuve and starring Mylène Demongeot, Maurice Ronet and Jean Servais. It is an adaptation of the 1957 novel Un silence de mort by Michel Lebrun.

It was shot at the Billancourt Studios in Paris. The film's sets were designed by the art director Jacques Chalvet.

== Cast ==
- Mylène Demongeot as Sylvie Mallet
- Maurice Ronet as Jean Mallet
- Jean Servais as André Reverdy
- Françoise Prévost as La secrétaire
- Jean Lara as L'inspecteur Toussaint
- Hubert Noël as Gérald Martin
- Florence Arnaud as La femme à la lampe
- Gilbert Edard as François
- Yves Arcanel as Le dessinateur
- Marc Doelnitz as Le boute en train
- Henri Maïk as Le photographe
- Jacques Dhéry as Le correcteur
- Françoise Brion as Jeanne d'Arc
- Claude Bolling as himself

== Reception ==
Frédéric Bonnaud called the movie "a caricature of pre-New Wave French cinema" and said "To endure it to the end, you have to love killer dialogue. ... These inanities are spoken with a knowing air, between meaningful silences. They serve as decoration for a banal story of adultery."

== Bibliography ==
- Walker-Morrison, Deborah. Classic French Noir: Gender and the Cinema of Fatal Desire. Bloomsbury Publishing, 2018.
