= Narcotics (film) =

1932 film

- Directed by: Kurt Gerron; Roger Le Bon
- Written by: Philipp Lothar Mayring; Fritz Zeckendorf; Georges Neveux
- Produced by: Bruno Duday
- Starring: Jean Murat; Danièle Parola; Jean Worms; Peter Lorre
- Cinematography: Carl Hoffmann
- Edited by: Constantin Mick
- Music by: Hans-Otto Borgmann
- Production company: UFA
- Distributed by: L'Alliance Cinématographique Européenne
- Release date: 16 December 1932
- Country: Germany
- Language: French

Narcotics (French: Stupéfiants) is a 1932 German drama film directed by Kurt Gerron and Roger Le Bon and starring Jean Murat, Danièle Parola and Jean Worms. It is the French-language version of the 1932 German film The White Demon.

== Synopsis ==
When an actress becomes addicted to drugs, her brother decides to take action against her supplier.

== Cast ==
- Jean Murat as Henri Werner - le frère de Liliane
- Danièle Parola as Liliane Werner - une grande actrice dépendante de la drogue
- Jean Worms as Louis Gordon
- Jean Mercanton as Pierre
- Jeanne Marie-Laurent as Madame Werner - la mère d'Henri et de Liliane
- Monique Rolland as Dora Lind
- Raoul Aslan as Dr. Ourousseff
- Peter Lorre as Le bossu
- Roger Karl as Le marquis d'Esquillon
- Gaston Mauger as Le capitaine
- Lucien Callamand as Le détective
- Henry Bonvallet as Le commissaire
- Léon Bary as Pierre Perade
- Brevannes
- Louis Brody
- Pierre Labry as Le docteur
- Margo Lion
- Héléna Manson as L'infirmière
- Pierre Piérade as L'ouvreur

== Bibliography ==
- Youngkin, Stephen (2005). The Lost One: A Life of Peter Lorre. University Press of Kentucky. ISBN 978-0-8131-7185-2.
