= Under Secret Orders =

- Theatrical release poster
- Directed by: Edmond T. Gréville
- Written by: Adaptation: Marcel Achard
- Screenplay by: Ernest Betts; Jacques Natanson
- Story by: Georges Hereaux; Irma von Cube
- Produced by: Max Schach
- Starring: Erich von Stroheim; John Loder; Dita Parlo; Claire Luce
- Cinematography: Alfred Black
- Edited by: Ray Pitt
- Music by: Hans May
- Production companies: Grafton Films; Trafalgar Film Productions
- Distributed by: United Artists
- Release dates: December 1937 (UK); 1 July 1943 (US)
- Running time: 84 minutes 66 minutes (US)
- Country: United Kingdom
- Language: English

Under Secret Orders, also known as Mademoiselle Doctor, is a 1937 British spy film directed by Edmond T. Gréville and starring Erich von Stroheim, John Loder, Dita Parlo and Claire Luce. It is an English-language version of the French film Mademoiselle Docteur, also known as Salonique, nid d'espions, and released in the United States as Street of Shadows, which was filmed at the same time under the direction of G. W. Pabst. Both films have exactly the same plot, but there were differences in the cast between the two: in particular, von Stroheim was not in the French version.

== Premise ==
During the First World War, a woman doctor falls in love with one of her patients who turns out to be a German spy. She herself ends up working for German intelligence.

== Cast ==
- Erich von Stroheim as Col. W. Mathesius / Simonis
- John Loder as Lt. Peter Carr
- Dita Parlo as Dr. Anne-Marie Lesser
- Claire Luce as Gaby, Rene's girl
- Gyles Isham as Lt. Hans Hoffman
- Clifford Evans as Rene Condoyan
- John Abbott as Armand
- Anthony Holles as Mario
- Edward Lexy as Carr's orderly
- Robert Nainby as French General
- Bryan Powley as Col. Burgoyne, French Secret Service
- Molly Hamley-Clifford as Madame Samuloi, Proprietor of the Blue Peacock
- Raymond Lovell as Col. von Steinberg
- Frederick Lloyd as Col. Marchand, Carr's boss
- Claude Horton as Captain Fitzmaurice

Cast notes:

- Stewart Granger appears in a small role

== Reception ==
Writing for Night and Day in 1937, Graham Greene gave the film a poor review, summarizing it as more movie than cinema. Greene described the writing as "a really shocking script, with childish continuity" and criticized the dialogue as "it ambles flatly along".

Kinematograph Weekly reported the film "ran extremely well" at the British box office in June 1938.

== See also ==
- Stamboul Quest – 1934 American film starring Myrna Loy
- Mademoiselle Docteur (also known as Salonique, nid d’espions and Street of Shadows) – 1937 French film directed by G.W. Pabst
- Fräulein Doktor – 1969 film, an Italian/Yugoslavian co-production
