= The Agony of the Eagles (1952 film) =

1952 film

- Directed by: Jean Alden-Delos
- Written by: Jean Alden-Delos
- Based on: Les Demi-soldes by Georges d'Esparbès
- Produced by: Jean Alden-Delos
- Starring: Roger Pigaut; Charles Moulin; Noël Roquevert
- Cinematography: Jean Lehérissey
- Edited by: Madeleine Bagiau
- Music by: François-Julien Brun; Tiarko Richepin
- Production company: Tranon Films
- Distributed by: Distribution Française de Films
- Release date: 14 October 1952
- Running time: 83 minutes
- Country: France
- Language: French

The Agony of the Eagles (French: L'agonie des aigles) is a 1952 French historical drama film directed by Jean Alden-Delos and starring Roger Pigaut, Charles Moulin and Noël Roquevert. Two previous films of the story had been made a 1922 silent film and a 1933 sound film. The film's sets were designed by the art director Claude Bouxin.

== Synopsis ==
Following Waterloo, Napoleon is defeated and in exile. Colonel de Montander, a veteran of the Napoleonic War, hatches a plot to restore the French Empire by placing the imprisoned, young Napoleon II on the throne.

== Cast ==
- Roger Pigaut as Col. de Montander
- Charles Moulin as Goglu
- Noël Roquevert as Capt. Doguereau
- Raymond Rognoni as Coutillo
- Colette Pearl as Lise Dorian
- Pierre Morin as Chambusque
- Jean Mauvais as Le commandant Thiéry
- Catherine Arley as La comtesse d'Ormesson
- Gérald Castrix as Lt. Triaire
- Robert Allan as Lt. Pascal de Breuilly
- Léonce Corne as Constant
- Henri Valbel as Le président du tribunal
- Roger Vincent as Le docteur
- Georges Bréhat
- Paul Lalloz
- Jean-Marc Lambert
- Jean Berton
- Maurice Dorléac
- Lucien Bryonne
- Jean-Pierre Lorrain

== Bibliography ==
- Klossner, Michael. The Europe of 1500-1815 on Film and Television: A Worldwide Filmography of Over 2550 Works, 1895 Through 2000. McFarland & Company, 2002.
