= Travels in the Congo (film) =

1927 film

- DVD
- French: Voyage au Congo
- Directed by: Marc Allégret
- Distributed by: Icarus Films (2018 release)
- Release date: 1927
- Running time: 117 minutes
- Countries: France; French Equatorial Africa
- Languages: Silent film French intertitles

Travels in the Congo (French: Voyage au Congo) is a French documentary film, directed by Marc Allégret. It depicts his expedition in French Equatorial Africa (which covered the modern nations of Gabon, Republic of Congo, Central African Republic and Chad). The film debuted on 8 July 1927, opening at the Théâtre du Vieux-Colombier. It was Allégret's first directorial effort.

== Background ==
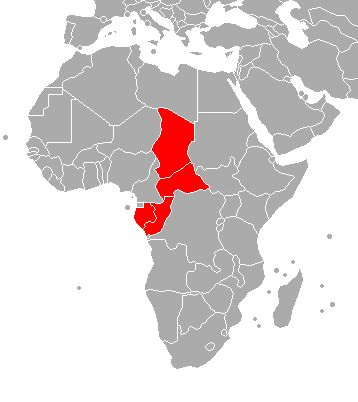
French Equatorial Africa as it existed in 1927

During World War I, the young Marc Allégret became the lover and companion of the novelist André Gide. In 1925, Allégret graduated from the Sciences Po and then embarked on an African expedition with Gide. They stayed in French Equatorial Africa for ten months. Allégret was tasked with recording their experiences in film and photographs. He had no formal training in either job, though he had received some lessons from Man Ray in photography.

The film is named after the defunct colony known as French Congo, which had been merged into the wider French Equatorial Africa. Gide preferred the older name, and commemorated his own experiences in a book also called Travels in the Congo. Allégret followed his example. The duo sailed from Bordeaux on 18 July 1925. Their first port in Africa was Dakar, which Gide found to be "gloomy", ugly, and lacking in exoticism. He found their next stop, Conakry, more pleasant. The duo left their ship in the port of Matadi, then followed a train route to Kinshasa, and finally reached Brazzaville on 14 August. They used it for a while as the base for their excursions. Allégret started filming in this area.

The duo would soon sail on the Congo River. Their months-long expedition included travels through the Ubangi-Shari, Lake Chad, and the French Cameroons. They sailed from Africa on 14 May 1926.

== Contents ==
The documentaries of the 1920s, such as Nanook of the North (1922) and La Croisière noire (1926), relied on "adventure" elements and exoticism to attract an audience. In contrast, Allégret set out to portray African cultures in an objective way. He deliberately excluded references to his manner of travel and the difficulties of the journey, to avoid focusing on "adventure". He also excluded several "grotesque" aspects of African life.

The film depicts the daily lives of eight ethnic groups, focusing on their agriculture, hunting, and fishing practices. The architectural styles of their areas and a number of group rituals, athletic competitions, and dances are also covered. Allégret's primary interest in the project was ethnographic, and he was genuinely attempting to promote understanding of the cultures he depicted. His depictions managed to avoid the "sensationalism" and stereotyping of the newsreels of the time.

In an attempt to minimize the "contaminating effect" of his presence, Allégret took to using a long-range telephoto lens for filming. When a scene was specifically staged for the camera, the director attempted to have the individuals involved acting as naturally as possible. He did so by getting them accustomed to the camera before starting to film.

His selection of human subjects was in part influenced by Primitivism. In an attempt to celebrate the "physical beauty, vitality, and moral purity" of Africans, the camera at times focuses on subjects suggesting eroticism. Brett Berliner notes that when the camera depicts "young nude women with firm breasts", it suggests that Allégret's vision of Africa was that of an aestheticized and sensual Garden of Eden—a view that arguably derives from the idealization of the natural man by thinkers of the Age of Enlightenment. In the context of the 1920s, this would contrast Africa with the perceived decadence of Europe. Brett Bowles argues that Allégret's "graceful" shots on the limbs, the backs, and the breasts of subjects dancing or competing in sports is borderline voyeurism and objectification. However, in the 1920s, this apparent fascination with the African body stood in contrast to widely-held European views that black people were neither beautiful nor worthy of artistic depiction.

Allégret devotes 16 minutes of Travels in the Congo to dramatizing the courtship and marriage customs of the Sara people. A fictional melodrama, concerning a young couple striving to win the approval of their respective families, introduces the audience to accurate sociological information of the courting culture of the Sara. The director personally managed all aspects of production of this segment, including the scouting of suitably scenic locations for filming and choosing the locals who portrayed the parts.

== Legacy ==
The documentary was not commercially successful, and failed to leave a mark in French popular culture. It was well received by critics, however, and helped launch a professional career for Allegret. His next few films were short documentary subjects on African locations, such as the island of Djerba and the areas surrounding Tripoli. His debut film itself is considered a pioneering ethnographic film, and its methodology was influential in this genre.

== Sources ==
- Berliner, Brett A. (2002), Ambivalent Desire: The Exotic Black Other in Jazz-age France, University of Massachusetts Press, ISBN 978-1558493568
- Bowles, Brett (2013), "Allégret, Marc", in Aitken, Ian (ed.), The Conscice Routledge Encyclopedia of the Documentary Film, Routledge, ISBN 978-1136512063
- Sheridan, Alan (1999), André Gide: A Life in the Present, Harvard University Press, ISBN 978-0674035270
