= Dita Parlo =

German actress (1908–1971)

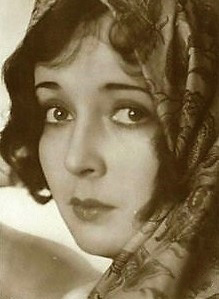
- Photo by Alexander Binder, c. 1928
- Born: Grethe Gerda Kornstädt or Gerda Olga Justine Kornstädt; 4 September 1908; Stettin, Pomerania, German Empire (present-day Szczecin, Poland)
- Died: 12 December 1971 (aged 63); Paris, France
- Occupation: Actress
- Years active: 1928–1965
- Spouse: Franck Gueutal (m. 1949)

Dita Parlo (born Grethe Gerda Kornstädt or Gerda Olga Justine Kornstädt; 4 September 1908 – 12 December 1971) was a German film actress.

== Early life and career ==
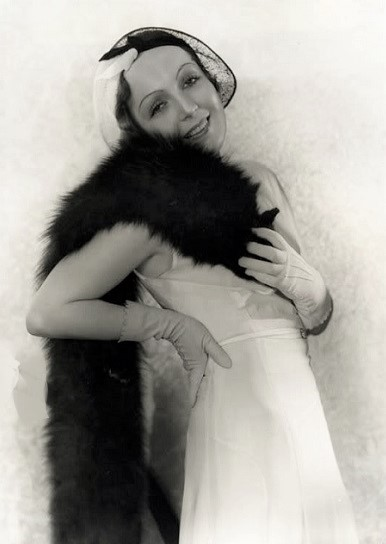
Parlo in 1931

Dita Parlo was born on 4 September 1908 in Stettin, Pomerania, then in the German Empire. Sources differ as to whether her birth name was Grethe Gerda Kornstädt or Gerda Olga Justine Kornstädt. Her birth year is also sometimes listed as being 1906.

Parlo made her first film appearance in Homecoming (Heimkehr) in 1928 and quickly became a popular actress in Germany. During the 1930s she moved easily between German and French films, achieving success in several films, including, in the span of four years, two that are considered among the greatest in cinema history: L'Atalante (1934) and La Grande Illusion (1937).

Parlo attempted to establish a career in American films but despite a couple of roles in Hollywood films, was unable to extend her European success. In the late 1930s, she was scheduled to appear in the Orson Welles production of Joseph Conrad's Heart of Darkness for RKO Radio Pictures, but the project was abandoned.

She was deported to Germany as an enemy alien during World War II, but returned to France in 1949. She made only two films after the war, Justice is Done (1950) and her final screen appearance in La Dame de pique (1965).

== Personal life and death ==
In 1949, she married a Protestant pastor, Franck Gueutal, with whom she remained until her death. She died on 12 December 1971 in Paris, France, although some sources list her death date as 13 December. She is buried at Cimetière Protestant de Montécheroux.

== In popular culture ==
Musician Steve Adey has a song called "Dita Parlo" on his 2012 studio album The Tower of Silence. The song was written in response to Jean Vigo's 1934 film L'Atalante. Parlo was referenced by Madonna, who said she had been fascinated by Parlo, and took her name for the character she created for her Sex book and Erotica album. Its title track commences with the line "My name is Dita, I'll be your mistress tonight..." Burlesque performer Dita Von Teese took her name in tribute to Parlo.

== Filmography ==
- Heimkehr (Homecoming) (1928) - Anna
- Die Dame mit der Maske (The Lady with the Mask) (1928) - Kitty
- Geheimnisse des Orients (Secrets of the Orient) (1928) - Slave of the Princess
- Ungarische Rhapsodie (Hungarian Rhapsody) (1928) - Marika
- Manolescu - Der König der Hochstapler (1929) - Jeanette
- Melodie des Herzens (Melody of the Heart) (1929) - Julia Balog
- I bora (1929)
- Au bonheur des dames (1930) - Denise Baudu
- Kismet (1931, German-language version produced by Warner Bros.)
- Tänzerinnen für Süd-Amerika gesucht (1931) - Dancer Inge
- Die heilige Flamme (The Sacred Flame) (1931)
- Tropennächte (Tropical Nights) (1931) - Alma
- Menschen hinter Gittern (Men Behind Bars) (1931) - Annie Marlow
- Honor of the Family (1931) - Roszi
- Wir schalten um auf Hollywood (1931) - Herself (uncredited)
- Mr. Broadway (1933, US, starring Ed Sullivan) - The Girl (archive footage) (uncredited)
- L'Atalante (1934) - Juliette
- Rapt (1934)
- Mademoiselle Docteur (1937) - Anne-Marie Lesser - dite Mademoiselle Docteur - une insaisissable espionne
- La Grande Illusion (1937) - Elsa
- L'Affaire du courrier de Lyon (1937) - Mina Lesurques
- Under Secret Orders (1937, English-language version of Mademoiselle Docteur) - Dr. Anne-Marie Lesser
- La Rue sans joie (1938) - Jeanne de Romer
- Ultimatum (1938) - Anna Salic
- Paix sur le Rhin (Peace on the Rhine) (1938) - Hedwige
- La signora di Montecarlo (1938) - Vera
- L'Inconnue de Monte Carlo (1939) - Vera
- L'Or du Cristobal (Cristobal's Gold) (1940) - Lisbeth
- Justice est faite (Justice is Done) (1950) - Elisabeth
- La Dame de pique (1965) - Comtesse Anna Fedorovna (final film role)
