= Aloha, le chant des îles =

- Directed by: Léon Mathot
- Screenplay by: Charles Spaak
- Starring: Jean Murat; Danièle Parola; Arletty
- Edited by: Jacques Desagneaux
- Release date: 16 December 1937
- Running time: 1h 51min
- Country: France
- Language: French

Aloha, le chant des îles is a 1937 French adventure film directed by Léon Mathot.

== Summary ==
During the London-Melbourne race, two aviators, one male (Guy,) the other female (Betty), are forced to land on a lost island in Polynesia. They learn to survive in difficult conditions and fall in love. Back in civilisation, their union does not prove obvious. Pierre is already married to Ginette, a movie actress, and Betty is engaged to her cousin Edouard. Moreover, Lord Stanton, her rich father, will not hear of a marriage with Guy. Will love ultimately triumph in spite of everything?

== Cast ==
- Jean Murat - Le capitaine Guy Rungis
- Danièle Parola - Betty Stanton
- Arletty - Ginette Gina
- André Alerme - Lord Stanton
- Raymond Aimos - Pantois
- Ketti Gallian - Maoupiti
- Nilda Duplessy - La religieuse
- Adrien Lamy - Édouard
- Charles Moulin - Manika
- Frédéric Mariotti - Le capitaine
- Ernest Ferny - Le premier officier
