= Parade en sept nuits =

- Directed by: Marc Allégret
- Written by: Marc Allégret; Marcel Achard; Henri Jeanson; René Lefèvre; Carlo Rim
- Starring: Louis Jourdan; Jules Berry; Victor Boucher; André Lefaur; Micheline Presle; Raimu
- Music by: Louis Beydts
- Release date: September 1941
- Country: France
- Language: French

Parade en sept nuits (French pronunciation: [paʁad ɑ̃ sɛt nɥi]) is a 1941 French film.

== Plot ==
In a dog pound, one of the dog tells stories about his former life, including adventures in a circus.

== Production ==
Production commenced in 1940 at Francoeur Studios in Paris, but was interrupted by the war. It resumed almost a year later in the city of Nice at the Victorine Studios.
