= Orage (film) =

- Directed by: Marc Allégret
- Written by: Marcel Achard; Jan Lustig; Henri Bernstein (play)
- Produced by: André Daven
- Starring: Charles Boyer; Michèle Morgan
- Cinematography: Armand Thirard
- Edited by: Yvonne Martin
- Music by: Georges Auric
- Production company: L'Alliance Cinématographique Européenne (ACE)
- Distributed by: L'Alliance Cinématographique Européenne (ACE)
- Release date: 1938
- Running time: 98 minutes
- Country: France
- Language: French

Orage is a 1938 French drama film directed by Marc Allégret. The screenplay was written by Marcel Achard and Jan Lustig, based on the play Le Venin by Henri Bernstein. The film stars Charles Boyer and Michèle Morgan in one of her first roles.

Robert Manuel attributes the film's success to its ensemble cast.

It tells the story of the mistress of an engineer who has a pregnant wife.

== Cast ==
- Charles Boyer as André Pascaud
- Michèle Morgan as Françoise Massart
- Lisette Lanvin as Gisèle Pascaud
- Robert Manuel as Gilbert
- Jean-Louis Barrault as The African

== Production ==
Boyer, an immense star at the time, was reportedly extremely cold toward Morgan as he was displeased to share the lead roles with a debutante. " With a better actress than Michèle Morgan, Boyer believed it could be a powerful drama.", according to John Baxter's biography of the actor.

== Reception ==
The film was described as a "popular melodrama".
