= Konrad Schragmüller =

German Nazi & SA general (1895–1934)

Chief of Police, Magdeburg
- In office 4 May 1933 – 30 June 1934
- Preceded by: Ferdinand Freiherr von Nordenflycht
- Succeeded by: Carl Christiansen

Führer, SA-Gruppe Mitte
- In office Spring 1933 – 30 June 1934
- SA-Stabschef: Ernst Röhm
- Preceded by: Hans von Tschammer und Osten

SA Special Commissioner to Anhalt and the Province of Saxony
- In office Spring 1933 – 30 June 1934

Additional positions
- 1932–1934: Reichstag Deputy

Personal details
- Born: Johann Konrad Schragmüller; 11 March 1895 Östrich, Province of Westphalia, Kingdom of Prussia, German Empire
- Died: 2 July 1934 (aged 39) Preußische Hauptkadettenanstalt, Lichterfelde, Nazi Germany
- Cause of death: Execution by firing squad
- Party: Nazi Party
- Relations: Elsbeth Schragmüller (sister)
- Occupation: Estate manager

Military service
- Allegiance: German Empire; Weimar Republic
- Branch/service: Royal Prussian Army; Luftstreitkräfte; Freikorps
- Years of service: 1914–1920
- Rank: Oberleutnant
- Unit: 13th Mounted Rifles; Freikorps Yorck von Wartenburg
- Battles/wars: World War I
- Awards: Iron Cross, 1st & 2nd class Wound Badge

Johann Konrad Schragmüller (11 March 1895 – 2 July 1934) was a German military officer and estate administrator who joined the Nazi Party and became an SA-Gruppenführer in the paramilitary Sturmabteilung (SA). He was the commander of SA-Gruppe Mitte, headquartered in Magdeburg, and was also the city's police chief and a deputy of the Reichstag. He was among those murdered in the Night of the Long Knives when Adolf Hitler launched a purge of the SA leadership.

== Early life ==
Schragmüller was born in Östrich, in the Mengede district of Dortmund, the son of a retired cavalry Rittmeister and Mengede Amtmann (local district administrator). His older sister, Elsbeth Schragmüller, was a university professor and a German spy in the First World War. After attending the Preußische Hauptkadettenanstalt (Prussian cadet academy) in Berlin-Lichterfelde, Schragmüller began a military career in March 1914 as a Fähnrich in the 13th Mounted Rifles of the Royal Prussian Army. He fought in the First World War and was promoted to Leutnant in 1915. The next year, he transferred to the Luftstreitkräfte with the rank of Oberleutnant. During the war, he was awarded the Iron Cross, 1st and 2nd class and the Wound Badge. After Germany's defeat, Schragmüller served in various Freikorps units in 1919 and 1920. As a member of the Freikorps Yorck von Wartenburg, he participated in battles against Poland and in the Baltic states. In the 1920s, he managed an estate in Schönberg in the Altmark region and was a livestock breeder.

== Career in the Nazi Party and the SA ==
Schragmüller joined the Nazi Party in the fall of 1929 (membership number 162,827) and played a major role in establishing the paramilitary Sturmabteilung (SA) in the Altmark. He became the leader of the SA-Standarte in Schönberg and rose to become the commander of SA-Untergruppe Magdeburg-Anhalt.

At the July 1932 parliamentary election, Schragmüller was elected as a Nazi Party deputy to the Reichstag for electoral constituency 10 (Magdeburg). Defeated in the 6 November 1932 election, he was returned to the Reichstag at the 5 March 1933 election and was reelected on 12 November 1933.

Schragmüller was promoted to SA-Gruppenführer and given command of the SA-Gruppe Mitte, headquartered in Magdeburg. In the spring of 1933, SA-Stabschef Ernst Röhm also appointed him as the Special Commissioner of the Supreme SA Leadership to Anhalt and the Prussian province of Saxony. Schragmüller next was appointed the acting police chief of Magdeburg on 4 May 1933 and was named permanent police chief of the city on 23 May 1934.

== Arrest and death ==
On 30 June 1934, Schragmüller was arrested in Munich during the Night of the Long Knives on his way to an SA leadership conference in Bad Wiessee. He was transferred to Berlin, where he was shot on 2 July on the grounds of the Lichterfelde Schutzstaffel (SS) barracks by a firing squad of the SS-Leibstandarte Adolf Hitler.

== Sources ==
- Information about Konrad Schragmüller in the Reichstag database
- Stockhorst, Erich (1985). 5000 Köpfe: Wer War Was im 3. Reich. Arndt. ISBN 978-3-887-41116-9.
- Venner, Dominique (1978): Söldner ohne Sold - Die deutschen Freikorps 1918-1923, Lübbe, Bergisch Gladbach, ISBN 3404008588
