= Homecoming (1928 film) =

1928 film directed by Joe May

- Directed by: Joe May
- Written by: Joe May; Fritz Wendhausen
- Based on: Karl und Anna; 1926 novella by Leonhard Frank
- Produced by: Erich Pommer
- Starring: Lars Hanson; Dita Parlo; Gustav Fröhlich
- Cinematography: Konstantin Irmen-Tschet; Günther Rittau
- Edited by: Joe May
- Music by: Willy Schmidt-Gentner; Karl Hajos
- Production company: UFA
- Distributed by: UFA
- Release dates: August 29, 1928 (Silent version); February 16, 1929 (Sound version)
- Running time: 120 minutes
- Country: Germany
- Languages: Silent Version; Sound Version (Synchronized) German intertitles

Homecoming (German: Heimkehr) is a 1928 German silent war drama film directed by Joe May and starring Lars Hanson, Dita Parlo, and Gustav Fröhlich. A sound version was prepared with the help of Paramount Pictures. While the sound version has no audible dialog, it was released with a synchronized musical score with sound effects using both the sound-on-disc and sound-on-film process. The sound version was more widely exhibited than the silent version due to the general public's apathy to silent films.

It was shot at the Babelsberg Studios in Berlin and on location in Hamburg. The film's sets were designed by the art director Artur Schwarz.

== Plot ==
Richard and Karl are German prisoners of war in Siberia. Since escape is almost impossible, they are unguarded and live an almost idyllic existence running a ferry. Richard misses his wife Anna greatly; he literally counts the days since he's seen her and tells Karl about her and their home in detail. When he decides to escape, Karl comes with him. While crossing a desert Richard collapses. He asks Karl to go on without him, but Karl refuses to leave his friend and carries him. But when Karl leaves to get water, Richard is recaptured and sent to work in a lead mine.

Karl makes it back to Hamburg, where he meets Anna and occupies a spare room in her flat. Soon friendship deepens, and both he and Anna have guilt feelings about their attraction.

Meanwhile, the war ends, and Richard returns just in time to witness Karl and Anna's first kiss. After his initial anger, Richard goes to Anna's bed. She cries; he takes her in his arms; she returns his embrace; but when he begins to make love to her, she refuses his advances. Richard returns to the room where Karl pretends to be asleep. He takes a pistol and prepares to kill Karl; but as he holds the gun to Karl's head, he recalls his friend's carrying him across the desert and puts the pistol away.

Realizing that nobody's to blame, Richard leaves Karl and Anna to each other and returns to his other great passion—life at sea on one of the freighters that sail from Hamburg.

== Cast ==
- Lars Hanson as Richard
- Gustav Fröhlich as Karl
- Dita Parlo as Anna
- Theodor Loos
- Philipp Manning

== Music ==
The sound version of the film featured a theme song entitled "Homecoming" which was composed by Harold Fraser Simon and Harry Graham.

== See also ==
- List of early sound feature films (1926–1929)

== Bibliography ==
- Bock, Hans-Michael; Bergfelder, Tim, eds. (2009). The Concise Cinegraph: Encyclopaedia of German Cinema. New York: Berghahn Books. ISBN 978-1-57181-655-9.
