= Charles Moulin =

French actor

- Born: 11 December 1909; Montélimar, Drôme, France
- Died: 24 January 1992 (aged 82); Montélimar, Drôme, France
- Occupation: Actor
- Years active: 1937–1990 (film & TV)

Charles Moulin (11 December 1909 – 24 January 1992) was a French film and television actor.

== Selected filmography ==
- L'ange du foyer (1937)
- Aloha, le chant des îles (1937) - Manika
- The Baker's Wife (1938) - Dominique, le berger
- Fort Dolorès (1939) - Angelo Pastor
- L'Arlésienne (1942) - Mitifio
- Le soleil a toujours raison (1943)
- Coup de tête (1944) - Le borgne (uncredited)
- Vive la liberté (1946) - Charles
- Le bataillon du ciel (1947) - Le Gorille
- Guilty? (1951) - Joseph
- The Agony of the Eagles (1952)
- Les chiffonniers d'Emmaüs (1955) - Kangourou
- Napoleon (1955) - Le général Mortier (uncredited)
- Goubbiah, mon amour (1956) - Jao - Trinida's Father
- Que les hommes sont bêtes (1957) - Justin le Lillois (uncredited)
- La Bigorne, caporal de France (1958)
- Il suffit d'aimer (1960) - Le brigadier
- Le caïd (1960) - Le Turc
- La pendule à Salomon (1961) - Morat
- A Man Named Rocca (1961) - Cipriano
- Kriss Romani (1963) - Le Baralimo
- On Murder Considered as One of the Fine Arts (1964)
- Circus Angel (1965) - Le Breton
- The Confession (1970)
- Death of a Corrupt Man (1977) - Serrano
- L'été de nos quinze ans (1983) - Le guérisseur
- Point mort (1984)

== Bibliography ==
- Goble, Alan. The Complete Index to Literary Sources in Film. Walter de Gruyter, 1999.
- Paietta, Ann C. Teachers in the Movies: A Filmography of Depictions of Grade School, Preschool and Day Care Educators, 1890s to the Present. McFarland, 2007.
