= Elsbeth Schragmüller =

German university professor-turned-spymaster

Elsbeth Schragmüller (7 August 1887, Schlüsselburg near Petershagen, Kingdom of Prussia, German Empire — 24 February 1940, Munich, Nazi Germany), also known as Fräulein Doktor and Mademoiselle Docteur, as well as Fair Lady, La Baronne and Mlle. Schwartz, was a German university professor-turned-spymaster for Abteilung III b in German-occupied Belgium during World War I.

== Early life ==
Schragmüller was the eldest of four children born to Prussian Army officer and bailiff Carl Anton Schragmüller and his wife Valesca Cramer von Clausbruch.

Schragmüller spent her childhood first in Schlüsselburg and then in Münster with her grandmother, who educated her. From 1909 to 1914, she studied political science at Albert-Ludwigs-Universität in Freiburg. She finished her studies in 1913 and was one of the first women in Germany to acquire a university degree. After her studies, she worked for the Berlin Lette-Verein as a lecturer in civic education.

== First World War ==
After the outbreak of the First World War, Schragmüller moved to occupied Belgium, where the German governor general, Field Marshal Colmar von der Goltz, assigned her to Section VII, wherein she worked first as part of a postal censorship team who opened and read private letters in search of coded messages from members of La Dame Blanche spy ring to British Intelligence.

She later switched to intelligence collection and worked, after a short training period, in Lille for the General Staff's counterintelligence wing, Abteilung IIIb. In 1915, Colonel Walter Nicolai, the head of Abteilung IIIb, promoted her to spymaster of the Kriegsnachrichtenstelle Antwerpen.

By the time of the Armistice, Schragmüller had been promoted to the rank of Oberleutnant in the Imperial German Army and had been awarded the Iron Cross First Class.

== Later life ==
After the November Revolution of 1918, Schragmüller returned to civilian life, resumed her academic career, and became the first female assistant chair at Freiburg University. Also under the Weimar Republic, her younger brother Konrad Schragmüller, became the Sturmabteilung (SA) chief of Magdeburg.

A few years later, she moved with her family to Munich. Soon afterward, her father and her brother Konrad, were both shot without trial during the Night of the Long Knives. Soon, she abruptly ended her university career for unknown reasons.

== Death ==
Schragmüller died in 1940 at the age of 52 of bone tuberculosis in her Munich apartment.

== Legacy ==
Her activities were the subject of various urban legends during the First World War, but since she was neither captured nor unmasked during her lifetime, much of her life story remains obscure and speculative, and it is unclear to what extent the various fictional treatments of her life story are accurate.

For many years, she was invariably known as Mademoiselle Docteur or Fräulein Doktor, her actual name being revealed only in 1945 from German intelligence documents captured by the Allies after World War II, when she had already died of miliary tuberculosis in 1940.

Her nickname acknowledges the fact that she had a doctoral degree in political science, not psychology as some fictional portrayals have claimed, from the University of Freiburg.

Her death early in the Second World War makes it unlikely that she contributed materially to the war effort even if some have claimed that she again engaged in espionage activities.

== See also ==
- Stamboul Quest – 1934 American film starring Myrna Loy
- Mademoiselle Docteur (also known as Salonique nid d’espions and Street of Shadows) – 1937 French film directed by G.W. Pabst
- Mademoiselle Doctor (also known as Under Secret Orders) – 1937 English film directed by Edmond T. Gréville, an English version of the above, shot at the same time, but with some cast changes.
- Fräulein Doktor – 1969 film, an Italian/Yugoslavian co-production
- Mata Hari – 1985 film; Elsbeth Schragmüller is shown as the master spy.
