= Let's Make a Night of It =

1937 film

- Directed by: Graham Cutts
- Written by: F. McGrew Willis; Hugh Brooke
- Based on: play by Henrik Ege
- Produced by: Walter C. Mycroft
- Starring: Charles "Buddy" Rogers; June Clyde; Claire Luce
- Cinematography: Claude Friese-Greene; Otto Kanturek
- Edited by: Flora Newton
- Music by: Harry Acres
- Production company: Associated British Picture Corporation
- Distributed by: Associated British Picture Corporation
- Release date: 28 June 1937
- Running time: 67 minutes
- Country: United Kingdom
- Language: English

Let's Make a Night of It is a 1937 British musical comedy film directed by Graham Cutts and starring Charles "Buddy" Rogers, June Clyde and Claire Luce. It was written by F. McGrew Willis and Hugh Brooke based on the play The Silver Spoon by Henrik Ege. It was distributed in America by Universal Pictures in 1938. The screenplay concerns a husband and his wife who acquire rival nightclubs at the same time.

== Plot ==
When Henry Boydell assumes ownership of the "Silver Slipper" nightclub, in lieu of a bad debt, he keeps this a secret from his wife Laura and daughter Peggy. Jack Kent, a waiter and aspiring performer, gets wind of Boydell's secret and blackmails him to obtain a job, and also to be near Peggy. Meanwhile, Laura buys the "Coconut Beach" club. When both clubs are raided by the police, the owners fiind each other face to face in the cells.

== Cast ==
- Charles "Buddy" Rogers as Jack Kent
- June Clyde as Peggy Boydell
- Claire Luce as Viola Vanders
- Fred Emney as Henry Boydell
- Iris Hoey as Laura Boydell
- Jack Melford as Count Castelli
- Claud Allister as Monty
- Steven Geray as Luigi
- Anthony Holles as Head Waiter
- Lawrence Anderson as Harold
- Zelma O'Neal as Kitty
- Bertha Belmore as police sergeant
- Syd Wakefield as policeman
- Dan Donovan as street singer
- Brian Michie as compere

== Reception ==
The Monthly Film Bulletin wrote: "Production, generally, is above the average; some of the stage settings in particular are attractively conceived. Buddy Rogers is capably romantic as Jack, and June Clyde is, as usual, full of vitality, as Peggy. But the hit of the film is Fred Emney, as Henry Boydell, whose every appearance is a signal for fresh laughter. The popular appeal of the film is increased by short and effective appearances by a large number of top-line music hall turns including Afrique, Steve Gray, Claire Luce, Molly Picon and the massed dance bands of Jack Jackson, Jack Harris."

Kine Weekly wrote: "Gay, lavishly mounted musical extravaganza. The film compares more than favorably with its American counterpart and would, had it not been for the American co-stars, Buddy Rogers and June Clyde, both of whom are coluorless and lacking in versatility, have surpassed even the best transatlantic importation. The majority of the supporting players are, however, very good, and best of all is Fred Emney. He is the kingpin of the show, which, incidentally, is, in spite of its stellar shortcomings, rattling good popular entertainment."
