= André Daven =

French film producer and director

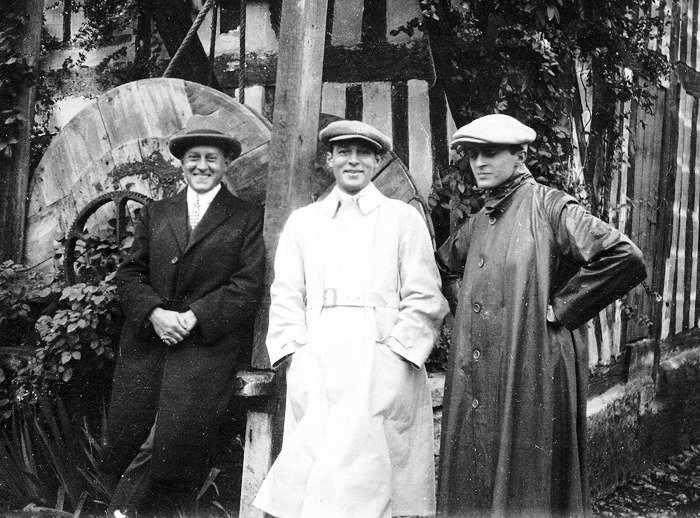
- On the right with Rolf de Maré, Rudolph Valentino and René André Daven outside the Concert-Damia, Paris, 1925.
- Born: 16 March 1900; Paris, France
- Died: 17 November 1981 (aged 81); Paris, France
- Occupations: Actor, producer, director
- Years active: 1920–1958 (film)

André Daven (1900–1981) was a French film producer, actor and director. In the mid-1920s he was the artistic director of the Theatre des Champs-Elysees in Paris when Josephine Baker was hired to appear there. During the German occupation of France during the Second World War he went to the United States where he produced four films.

He was married to the actress Danièle Parola.

== Selected filmography ==
=== Actor ===
- La Femme de nulle part (1922)
- Don Juan et Faust (1922)
- The Courier of Lyon (1923)
- Monsieur Beaucaire (1924)

=== Producer or director ===
- Baccara (1933)
- Adventure in Paris (1936)
- Under Western Eyes (1936)
- Gribouille (1937)
- Orage (1938)
- Tonight We Raid Calais (1943)
- Paris After Dark (1943)
- Home in Indiana (1944)
- Nob Hill (1945)
- Marianne of My Youth (1955)
- The Grand Maneuver (1955)
- Gates of Paris (1957)
- That Night (1958)

== Bibliography ==
- Roger Nichols. The Harlequin Years: Music in Paris 1917–1929. University of California Press, 2002.
