= Stamboul Quest =

1934 film by Sam Wood

- Swedish theatrical release poster
- Directed by: Sam Wood; Jack Conway (uncredited)
- Screenplay by: Herman J. Mankiewicz; Richard Schayer (uncredited)
- Story by: Leo Birinski
- Produced by: Bernard H. Hyman; Sam Wood
- Starring: Myrna Loy; George Brent; Lionel Atwill
- Cinematography: James Wong Howe
- Edited by: Hugh Wynn
- Music by: William Axt (uncredited)
- Production company: Metro-Goldwyn-Mayer
- Distributed by: Loew's Inc.
- Release date: July 13, 1934 (US)
- Running time: 86 minutes
- Country: United States
- Language: English

Stamboul Quest is a 1934 American spy film set in World War I, directed by Sam Wood, starring Myrna Loy and George Brent and featuring Lionel Atwill. The screenplay was written by Herman J. Mankiewicz from a story by Leo Birinski.

== Plot ==
In 1915 Berlin, the German high command is worried about ally Turkey. Recent British attacks on the vital Dardanelles show signs of inside knowledge. Von Sturm, the head of German intelligence, suspects Ali Bey, the Turkish commander of the region, is the traitor responsible.

As his best agent has not been heard from in several weeks, von Sturm assigns Kruger the task. Shortly afterwards, Annemarie, known by the code name "Fräulein Doktor", returns after completing her mission. She also informs von Sturm that fellow spy Mata Hari has fallen in love with her assigned target and can no longer be trusted. She recommends that an incriminating message be sent using a code that she thinks Mata Hari has given to the Allies. She also suspects Kruger and discovers he is actually British double agent Bertram Church VC. When Kruger is arrested at his dentist contact's office, another patient, Douglas Beall, an American studying medicine in Germany, is also taken into custody.

Beall is later released. Just to be sure though, von Sturm orders Annemarie to make sure Beall is innocent. She arranges to be rescued from an unwanted "suitor" by Beall, who invites her to his hotel suite. During the course of the evening, he confesses he has fallen in love with her, now going by the name Helena Bohlen. Helena is attracted to him, but when she reads a coded message from von Sturm informing her that he has taken her advice regarding Mata Hari, she abruptly leaves.

Beall persists however. When Helena boards the train to Constantinople, he follows her on the spur of the moment and continues courting her, despite her half-hearted attempts to discourage him. Her assistant Karl watches with growing concern. As they near the Turkish border, she orders Karl to return to Germany so Beall can use his visa.

To answer Beall's persistent questions, Helena has to admit she is a German spy. This has no effect on his love. Meanwhile, she attracts Ali Bey with her beauty. When she accepts his invitation to dinner, she poses as British agent K-6 and negotiates for vital information. To gain his trust, she arranges for Beall to be framed as a spy by von Sturm (who has arrived after becoming concerned by Karl's reports) and supposedly executed by firing squad, though a French prisoner is to be substituted. His suspicions (and jealousy) allayed, Ali Bey compromises himself and is arrested by his Turkish superiors.

When von Sturm admits that he was unable to make the switch and that Beall really was shot, Helena loses her sanity and is confined in a nunnery. Refusing to accept the truth, she remains confident that her lover will find her and take her away. It turns out that von Sturm had lied in an attempt to avoid losing his best agent. He had not dared to risk antagonizing a then-neutral America. In the final scene, Helena is reunited with Beall.

== Cast ==
- Myrna Loy as Annemarie, also known as Fräulein Doktor and Helena Bohlen
- George Brent as Douglas Beall
- Lionel Atwill as von Sturm
- C. Henry Gordon as Ali Bey
- Rudolph Amendt as Karl
- Mischa Auer as Ameel Roberts, Ali Bey's assistant
- Leo G. Carroll as Kruger - #117 aka Bertram Church
- Hooper Atchley as Turkish Colonel

== Production ==
The story in Stamboul Quest is based on an actual person, a German-trained spy in World War I named Annamarie Lesser – as in this film – or possibly Elsbeth Schragmüller who used the code name "Fräulein Doktor" – probably referring to the PhD she held from the University of Freiburg – and who ran a training school for espionage agents in Antwerp, Belgium, during the German occupation of the city. According to Myrna Loy's autobiography, the studio was particularly careful about how the script portrayed Fräulein Doktor, since at the time the film was made she was still alive, and a drug addict, living in a sanatorium in Switzerland, and they were concerned about being sued for libel. Although the exploits of Fräulein Doktor are not well known, and have been overshadowed by those of Mata Hari, it was possibly Fräulein Doktor who exposed Mata Hari, resulting in the latter facing a French firing squad for espionage. Fräulein Doktor herself was never caught.

George Brent was borrowed from Warner Bros. for this film.

== See also ==
Other films about "Fräulein Doktor":

- Mademoiselle Docteur (also known as Salonique, nid d’espions and Street of Shadows) – 1937 French film directed by G.W. Pabst
- Mademoiselle Doctor (also known as Under Secret Orders) – 1937 English film directed by Edmond T. Gréville, an English version of the above, shot at the same time, but with some cast changes.
- Fräulein Doktor – 1969 film, an Italian/Yugoslavian co-production with music and score by Ennio Morricone.
