= Roger Karl =

French actor (1882–1984)

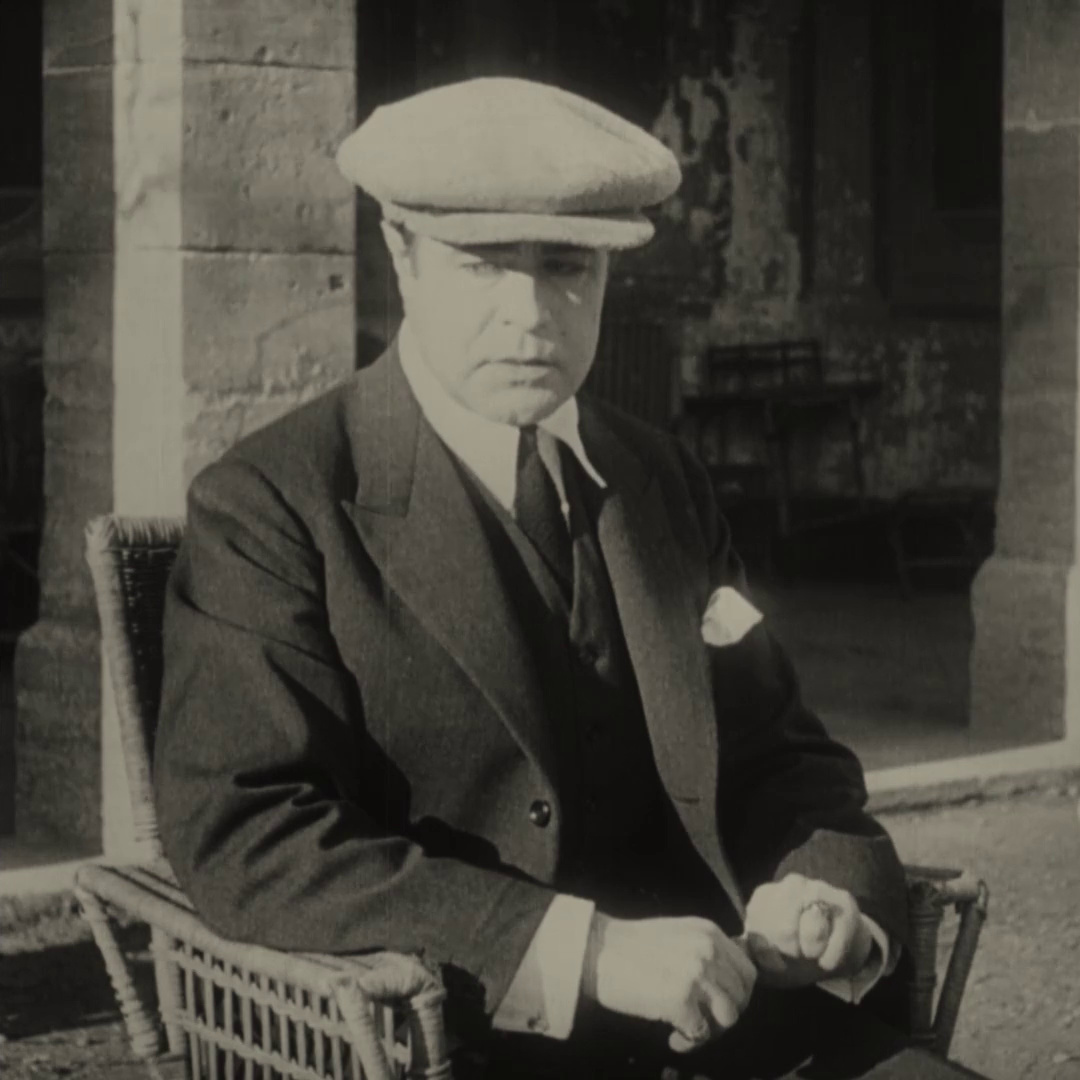
- Roger Karl in La Femme de nulle part
- Born: Roger Trouvé; 29 April 1882; Bourges, France
- Died: 4 May 1984 (aged 102); Paris, France
- Occupation: Actor
- Years active: 1929–1971

Roger Karl (29 April 1882 – 4 May 1984) was a French actor. Karl was born Roger Trouvé in Bourges.

== Biography ==
A friend of Paul Léautaud he long hesitated between literary career, painting and theater. He first published his Journal under the name of Michel Balfort with the title Journal d'un homme de nulle part (Diary of a Man out of Nowhere). He tried theater before 1914 with the cast of Jacques Copeau, he also published with Mercure de France a novel, Une mère (A Mother), using the pseudonym PR Carle. Hired by Antoine at the Odeon Theater, he still participated in tours with Sarah Bernhardt and played the role of Dmitri Karamazov in The Brothers Karamazov, an adaptation of Jean Jacques Copeau and Croué. Member of the first troupe of the Théâtre du Vieux-Colombier in 1913-1914, he did not appreciate the ascetic atmosphere or gymnastic methods and became postwar interpreter of Porche Francis and Henry Bataille.

He then turned to film, where he played great supporting roles, notably in 1920 in L'Homme du large (Man of the Open Seas) by Marcel L'Herbier, after Un drame au bord de la mer (A Drama on the Seashore) by Honoré de Balzac, and La Femme de nulle part (The Woman from Nowhere) under the direction of Louis Delluc. He then toured with Julien Duvivier, Jean Grémillon, Abel Gance, Marc Allégret, Christian-Jaque, but he did not appreciate the constraints of film any more than those of theater and hide his talents in routine jobs.

Karl died in 1984 at the age of 102.

== Selected filmography ==
- Misdeal (1928)
- Little Devil May Care (1928)
- Cagliostro (1929)
- Fantômas (1932)
- The Star of Valencia (1933)
- The Case of Doctor Brenner (1933)
- Gold (1934) (French-language version)
- Narcotics (1934)
- Prince Jean (1934)
- Moscow Nights (1934)
- The Mysteries of Paris (1935)
- Lucrezia Borgia (1935)
- The Decoy (1935)
- The Devil in the Bottle (1935)
- The Legend of Prague (1936)
- When Midnight Strikes (1936)
- In the Service of the Tsar (1936)
- The Phantom Gondola (1936)
- Street of Shadows (1937)
- Mademoiselle Docteur (1937)
- In Venice, One Night (1937)
- A Man to Kill (1937)
- Princess Tarakanova (1938)
- Fort Dolores (1939)
- Case of Conscience (1939)
- My Crimes After Mein Kampf (1940)
- The Master Valet (1941)
- Strange Inheritance (1943)
- The White Truck (1943)
- Boule de suif (1945)
- The Faceless Enemy (1946)
- Rumours (1947)
- The Case of Doctor Laurent (1957)
- La Poupée (1962)
