= Gaston Mauger =

French actor

- Born: Henri Gaston Mauger; 13 March 1878; La Haye-Malherbe, Eure, France
- Died: 18 October 1954 (aged 76); Paris, France
- Occupation: Actor
- Years active: 1929–1947 (film)

Gaston Mauger (13 March 1878 – 18 October 1954) was a French stage and film actor. He made around forty film appearances, including the 1932 thriller Narcotics.

== Selected filmography ==
- The Queen's Necklace (1929)
- Accused, Stand Up! (1930)
- Departure (1931)
- Narcotics (1932)
- Cognasse (1932)
- The Man with the Hispano (1933)
- Mademoiselle Josette, My Woman (1933)
- The Princess's Whim (1934)
- The Devil in the Bottle (1935)
- Moutonnet (1936)
- Wells in Flames (1937)
- Deputy Eusèbe (1939)
- The Woman Who Dared (1944)
- Not So Stupid (1946)
- The Adventures of Casanova (1947)

== Bibliography ==
- Youngkin, Stephen. The Lost One: A Life of Peter Lorre. University Press of Kentucky, 2005.
