= Fort Dolorès =

1939 film

- Directed by: René Le Hénaff
- Written by: Jean des Vallières (novel and screenplay)
- Produced by: Jean des Vallières
- Starring: Roger Karl; Gina Manès; Pierre Larquey
- Cinematography: Boris Kaufman
- Edited by: Jean Mondollot
- Music by: Marius-François Gaillard
- Production company: Société de Production et d'Exploitation du Film Fort-Dolorès
- Distributed by: Pathé Distribution
- Release date: 1 March 1939
- Running time: 93 minutes
- Country: France
- Language: French

Fort Dolorès (French: Fort-Dolorès) is a 1939 French western film directed by René Le Hénaff and starring Roger Karl, Gina Manès and Pierre Larquey. The film's sets were designed by the art director Aimé Bazin.

== Cast ==
- Roger Karl as Don Ramirez de Avila
- Gina Manès as Lola
- Pierre Larquey as Jefke Vandenbom, le Belge
- Paul Escoffier as Pasquale
- Paul Asselin as Malcolm Trubbles
- Arthur Devère as le général
- Philippe Hersent as Marco Lopez
- Teddy Michaud as Enrique Benitero
- Charles Moulin as Angelo Pastor
- Alexandre Rignault as Cesare Rossi
- Maurice Rémy as Walter Knoppendorf
- Georges Sellier as Carlos Orgaz
- Georges Tourreil as Juan, le prêtre
- Alina de Silva as Consuelo
- Robert Guilbert as Domingo Lapar
- Henry Roger as Martial Vandeuil
- Joe Alex
- Gaby Andreu
- Paul Asselin
- Robert Bassac
- Marfa Dhervilly
- Henri Nassiet
- Annie France
- Ariane Anda
- Flavia Escola
- Géo Lecomte
- Monique Montey
- Charles Redgie

== Bibliography ==
- Crisp, C.G. Genre, Myth, and Convention in the French Cinema, 1929-1939. Indiana University Press, 2002.
