= Up the River =

1930 film directed by John Ford

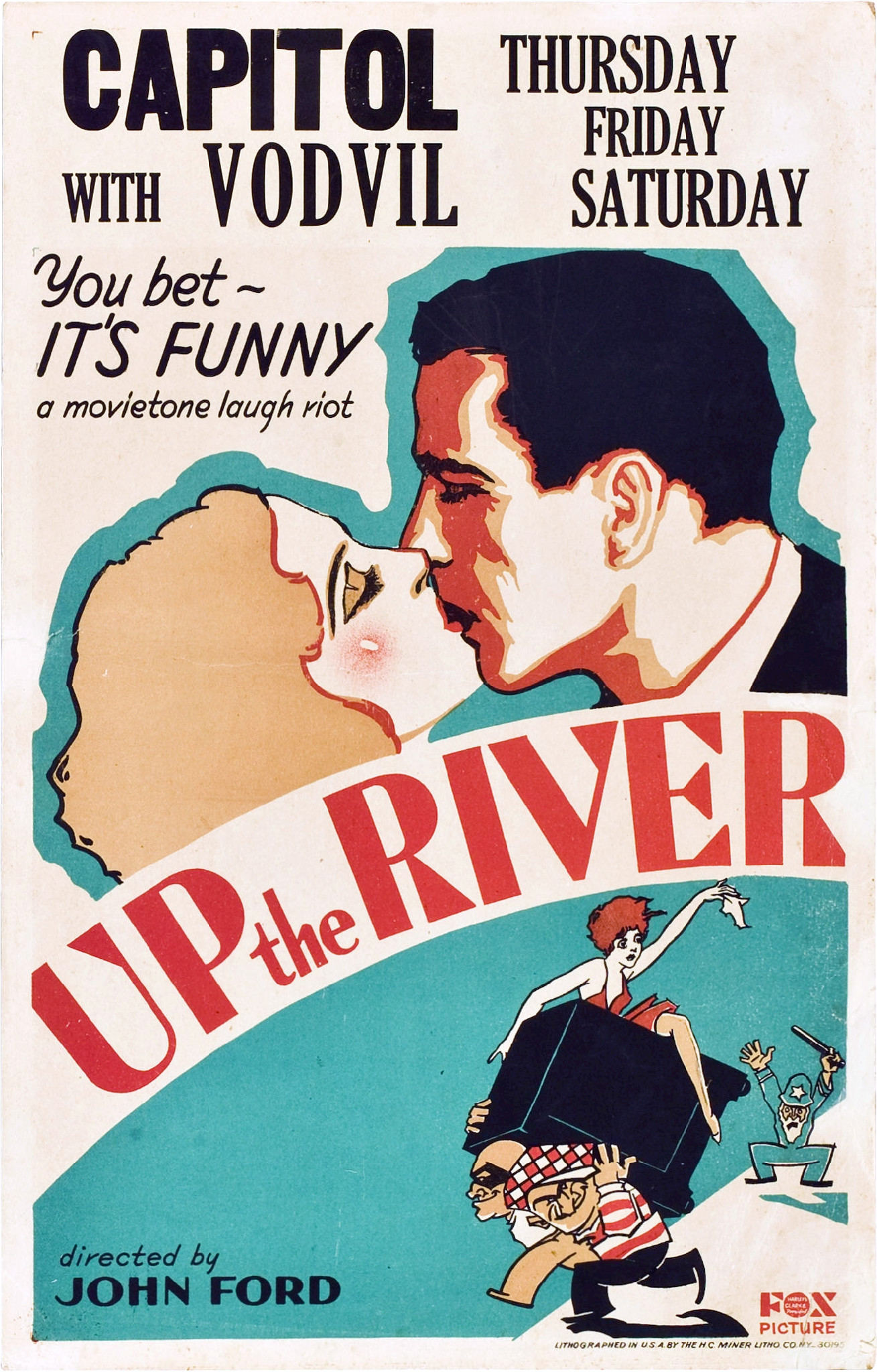
- Poster with Claire Luce and Humphrey Bogart
- Directed by: John Ford
- Written by: Maurine Dallas Watkins
- Produced by: William Fox
- Starring: Spencer Tracy; Humphrey Bogart
- Cinematography: Joseph H. August
- Edited by: Frank E. Hull
- Music by: James F. Hanley; Joseph McCarthy
- Distributed by: Fox Film Corporation
- Release date: October 10, 1930 (New York)
- Running time: 92 minutes
- Country: United States
- Language: English

Up the River is a 1930 American pre-Code comedy film directed by John Ford and starring Claire Luce as well as Spencer Tracy and Humphrey Bogart in their feature-film debuts and the only film in which the men appeared together. Fox remade the film in 1938 starring Preston Foster and Tony Martin.

== Plot ==
Up the River (1930)

Two convicts, St. Louis and Dannemora Dan, befriend another convict named Steve, who is in love with the incarcerated Judy. Steve is paroled, promising Judy that he will wait for her release five months later. He returns to his hometown in New England and his mother's home but is followed there by Judy's former boss, a scam artist named Frosby who threatens to expose Steve's prison record if Steve refuses to participate in a scheme to defraud his neighbors. Steve complies until Frosby defrauds his mother.

St. Louis and Dannemora Dan escape from prison and come to Steve's aid, removing a gun that he had planned to use to shoot Frosby and recovering bonds stolen by Frosby. They return to prison in time for its annual baseball game against a rival penitentiary.

== Cast ==
- Spencer Tracy as Saint Louis
- Claire Luce as Judy Fields
- Warren Hymer as Dannemora Dan
- Humphrey Bogart as Steve Jordan
- Morgan Wallace as Frosby (Uncredited)
- William Collier, Sr. as Pop
- Joan Lawes as Jean
- Bob Burns as "Slim", Bazooka Player (Uncredited and in blackface)
- Edythe Chapman as Mrs. Jordan (Uncredited)
- Ward Bond as Inmate Socked by Saint Louis (Uncredited)
- Steve Pendleton as Morris (Uncredited)

== Production ==
Up the River was produced in 1930 by Fox Film during John Ford's early sound period; it was reportedly conceived as a grim prison drama until MGM's The Big House prompted a reworking into a comedy, and Ford later credited William Collier Sr. with helping him rewrite the script.

The scenario was written by Maurine Dallas Watkins, the cinematography was by Joseph H. August, and the editing was by Frank E. Hull.

Ford foregrounds male camaraderie, structuring the plot around two veteran convicts who break out to help a friend and then return in time for a prison baseball game against a rival team.

The cast featured Spencer Tracy at the start of his screen career opposite Warren Hymer, with an early appearance by Humphrey Bogart in a “nice boy” role atypical of his later persona.

Upon release, Fox announced plans to continue Tracy and Hymer as a comedy team, but after a further teaming in Goldie (1931) the idea was abandoned.

The film was produced and released by Fox Film Corporation in 1930 under the direction of John Ford.

Only a worn, splice‑riddled exhibition print of the film is known to survive; the same compromised element was later included in Twentieth Century Fox’s Ford at Fox DVD collection, enabling access despite its condition.

== Reception ==
In a contemporary review for The New York Times, critic Mordaunt Hall noted that the film "often proved to be violently funny" to his fellow audience members and wrote: "It has a number of clever incidents and lines, but now and again it is more than a trifle too slow."

== See also ==
- List of baseball films

== Bibliography ==
- New England Vintage Film Society, ed. (2008). Spencer Tracy: The Pre-Code Legacy of a Hollywood Legend. Newton, Massachusetts: New England Vintage Film Society. ISBN 978-1-4363-4138-7.
