= The Best Mistress =

1929 film

- Directed by: René Hervil
- Written by: Jean-Louis Bouquet
- Based on: The Best Mistress by Georges Oudard
- Starring: Sandra Milovanoff; Félicien Tramel; Danièle Parola
- Cinematography: René Guichard
- Production company: Le Film d'Art
- Distributed by: Etablissements Louis Aubert
- Release date: 7 September 1929
- Running time: 80 minutes
- Country: France
- Languages: Silent; French intertitles

The Best Mistress (French: La meilleure maîtresse) is a 1929 French silent comedy film directed by René Hervil and starring Sandra Milovanoff, Félicien Tramel and Danièle Parola. The film's sets were designed by the art directors Christian-Jaque and Fernand Delattre.

== Cast ==
- Sandra Milovanoff as Denise
- Félicien Tramel as Vachette
- Danièle Parola as Mrs. Langford
- Hubert Daix as Un employé
- Paul Amiot as Un employé
- Émile Saint-Ober as Un employé

== Bibliography ==
- Connelly, Robert B. The Silents: Silent Feature Films, 1910-36, Volume 40, Issue 2. December Press, 1998.
- Rège, Philippe. Encyclopedia of French Film Directors, Volume 1. Scarecrow Press, 2009.
