= Balthazar (1937 film) =

1937 film directed by Pierre Colombier

- Directed by: Pierre Colombier
- Written by: Jean-Henri Blanchon; Marc Cab
- Based on: Balthazar by Léopold Marchand
- Produced by: Robert Aisner
- Starring: Jules Berry; Danièle Parola; André Alerme
- Cinematography: Victor Arménise; Christian Gaveau; Robert Juillard; Jean Lallier
- Edited by: Christian Chamborant
- Music by: Marcel Lattès
- Production company: Héraut Film
- Distributed by: Les Films Agiman
- Release date: 29 December 1937
- Running time: 90 minutes
- Country: France
- Language: French

Balthazar is a 1937 French comedy film directed by Pierre Colombier and starring Jules Berry, Danièle Parola and André Alerme. It was based on the play of the same title by Léopold Marchand. It was shot at the Joinville Studios of Pathé in Paris. The film's sets were designed by the art director Jacques Colombier.

== Synopsis ==
On the coast of Provence Germaine Philippe knocks down a man and then assists him. Soon afterwards the stranger is revealed to be the eccentric millionaire Balthazar Lemonnier who then purchases an island just across the villa where she lives with her husband. Everyone in the area tries to ingratiate themselves with the wealthy newcomer. However a rumour spreads that he is in fact a lunatic.

== Cast ==
- Jules Berry as Balthazar Lemonnier
- Danièle Parola as Germaine Philippe
- André Alerme as Albert Philippe
- Fernand Charpin as Le Gac
- Robert Arnoux as Boutrot
- Dany Lorys as La bonne
- Doumel as Cassini
- Marcel Maupi as Le charron
- Paul Fournier as Villor
- Jacqueline Pacaud as Luce
- Édouard Delmont as Balicot
- Lucas Gridoux as Le professeur Berroyer

== Bibliography ==
- Bessy, Maurice & Chirat, Raymond. Histoire du cinéma français: 1935-1939. Pygmalion, 1986.
- Crisp, Colin. Genre, Myth and Convention in the French Cinema, 1929-1939. Indiana University Press, 2002.
- Goble, Alan. The Complete Index to Literary Sources in Film. Walter de Gruyter, 1999.
- Rège, Philippe. Encyclopedia of French Film Directors, Volume 1. Scarecrow Press, 2009.
