= Danièle Parola =

French actress (1905–1998)

- Born: Yvonne Canale Parola; March 28, 1905; Paris, France
- Died: September 2, 1998 (aged 93); Paris, France
- Occupation: Actress
- Years active: 1927–1938 (film)

Danièle Parola (March 28, 1905 – September 2, 1998) was a French film actress. She starred in the 1932 crime film Narcotics. She was married to the actor and producer André Daven.

== Selected filmography ==
- The Orchid Dancer (1928)
- The Best Mistress (1929)
- Delicatessen (1930)
- The Lovers of Midnight (1931)
- Narcotics (1932)
- The Last Blow (1932)
- The Merry Widow (1934)
- Adventure in Paris (1936)
- Under Western Eyes (1936)
- Aloha, le chant des îles (1937)
- Balthazar (1937)

== Bibliography ==
- Youngkin, Stephen. The Lost One: A Life of Peter Lorre. University Press of Kentucky, 2005.
