= The Lovers of Midnight (1931 film) =

1931 French-German film

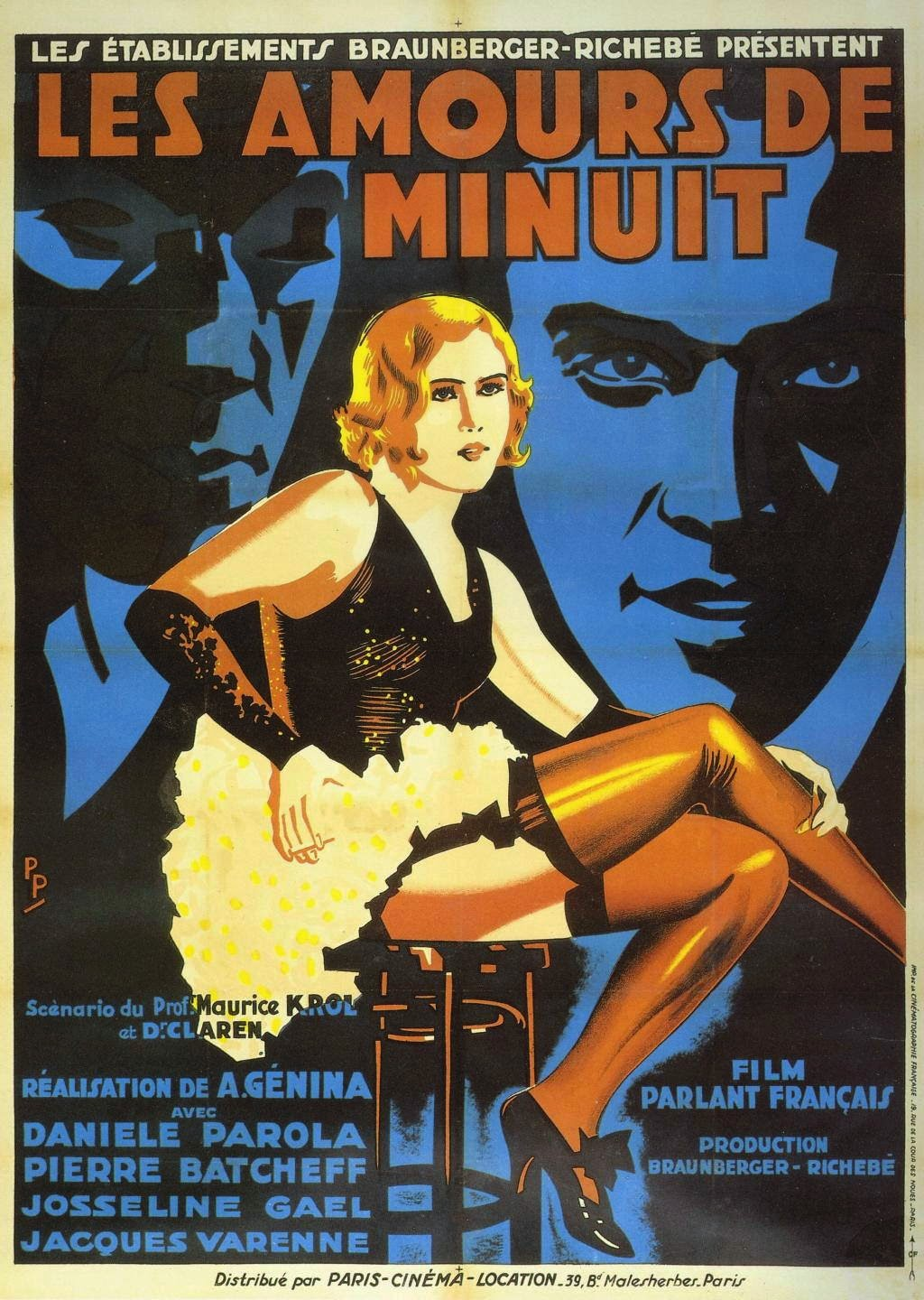
- Directed by: Augusto Genina; Marc Allégret
- Written by: Carl Behr; Paul Bringuier; Augusto Genina; Georg C. Klaren; Maurice Krol; Georges Neveux
- Produced by: Pierre Braunberger; Carl Froelich; Roger Richebé
- Starring: Danièle Parola; Pierre Batcheff [Josseline Gaël]]
- Cinematography: Roger Hubert; Theodor Sparkuhl
- Edited by: Jean Mamy
- Music by: Philippe Parès; Georges Van Parys
- Production companies: Carl Froelich-Film; Les Établissements Braunberger-Richebé
- Distributed by: Paris-Cinéma Location
- Release date: 16 January 1931
- Running time: 109 minutes
- Countries: France; Germany
- Language: French

The Lovers of Midnight (French: Les amours de minuit) is a 1931 French-German crime drama film directed by Augusto Genina and Marc Allégret and starring Danièle Parola, Pierre Batcheff and Josseline Gaël. It is a Multiple-language version with a separate German-language version, Mitternachtsliebe, also produced. It was the first sound film to be made at the Billancourt Studios in Paris. It was remade as the 1943 film Voyage Without Hope during the Occupation period.

== Synopsis ==
Marcel, a young bank clerk who has stolen money on a whim, is heading south to catch a ship to Latin America. On the train he encounters ruthless criminal Gaston who persuades his mistress Georgette, a singer in a nightclub, to seduce and rob the clerk. However, she begins to develop feelings for him.

== Cast ==
- Danièle Parola as Georgette Lajoie
- Pierre Batcheff as Marcel Valmont
- Louis Zellas as Le Capitaine / The Captain
- Josseline Gaël as Fanny
- Jacques Varennes as Gaston Bouchard
- Pierre Labry as Le policier

== Bibliography ==
- Powrie, Phil; Rebillard, Éric (2009). Pierre Batcheff and stardom in 1920s French cinema. Edinburgh: Edinburgh University Press.
- Rège, Philippe (2009). Encyclopedia of French Film Directors. Vol. 1. Scarecrow Press.
