= Adventure in Paris =

1936 film

- Directed by: Marc Allégret
- Written by: Henri Falk; Jan Lustig; Claude-André Puget
- Produced by: André Daven
- Starring: Jules Berry; Lucien Baroux; Danièle Parola
- Cinematography: Michel Kelber
- Music by: Vincent Scotto
- Production companies: Productions André Daven; Les Films Osso
- Distributed by: Pathé Consortium Cinéma; L'Alliance Cinématographique Européenne
- Release date: 3 December 1936
- Running time: 95 minutes
- Country: France
- Language: French

Adventure in Paris (French: Aventure à Paris) is a 1936 French comedy film directed by Marc Allégret and starring Jules Berry, Lucien Baroux and Danièle Parola. It was shot at the Billancourt Studios in Paris and on location around the city. The film's sets were designed by the art director Eugène Lourié.

== Synopsis ==
A carefree young man in Paris is enlisted by his landlord to try and teach him how to woo women.

== Cast ==
- Jules Berry as Michel Levasseur
- Lucien Baroux as Raymond Sauvaget
- Danièle Parola as Lucienne Aubier
- Arletty as Rose Blondel de Saint-Leu
- Robert Seller as Le vicomte de Joymont
- Germaine Aussey as Lili Schiaparelli
- Julien Carette as Le chasseur du restaurant
- Robert Vattier as Maître Corneille
- Alsonia as Ida
- May Francis as Suzanne
- Gisèle Préville as Solange Surnisse
- Chaz Chase as Lui-même
- Floyd Du Pont as Lui-même
- Ray Ventura as Lui-même
- France Aubert as La chanteuse
- Georges Bever as Le domestique de Raymond
- Lucien Callamand
- Jean Deiss
- Doumel
- Abel Jacquin
- Philippe Janvier
- Marc-Hély
- Robert Ozanne
- Robert Ralphy
- Jacques Scey
- Grégoire Aslan as Un membre de l'orchestre de Ray Ventura
- Louis Gasté as Un membre de l'orchestre de Ray Ventura
- Michèle Rauge

== Bibliography ==
- James Robert Parish. Film Actors Guide. Scarecrow Press, 1977.
