= Street of Shadows (1937 film) =

1937 French film by G.W. Pabst

- French theatrical release poster
- Directed by: G. W. Pabst
- Screenplay by: Jacques Natanson
- Story by: Georges Neveaux; Irma Von Cube
- Produced by: Romain Pinés
- Starring: Pierre Blanchar; Dita Parlo; Pierre Fresnay; Viviane Romance; Roger Karl
- Cinematography: Eugen Schüfftan
- Edited by: Louisette Hautecoeur; Marc Sorkin
- Music by: Arthur Honegger; Casimir Oberfeld
- Production companies: Films Romain Pinès; Pathé
- Distributed by: United Artists
- Release dates: 9 April 1937 (Paris); 13 May 1937 (France)
- Running time: 116 minutes
- Country: France
- Language: French

Street of Shadows (French: Mademoiselle Docteur or Salonique, nid d'espions) is a 1937 French spy film directed by G. W. Pabst. An English-language version with exactly the same plot was filmed at the same time under the direction of Edmond T. Gréville, but with some changes in the cast. Dita Parlo remained as Mademoiselle Docteur, but Erich von Stroheim took over the part of the German spy chief. The English-language version was released in the United States under the title Under Secret Orders. It was shot at the Joinville Studios in Paris. The film's sets were designed by the art directors Robert Hubert and Serge Piménoff.

== Cast ==
- Pierre Blanchar as Grégor Courdane
- Dita Parlo as Mademoiselle Docteur
- Pierre Fresnay as Le capitaine Georges Carrère
- Roger Karl as Le colonel Bourget
- Viviane Romance as Gaby
- Jean-Louis Barrault as Le client fou
- Marcel Lupovici as Alexandre
- Gaston Modot as Le patron du café
- Robert Manuel as Un invité au consulat
- Ernest Ferny as Le capitaine Louvier
- Georges Colin as Le major Jacquart
- Georges Péclet as Gregorieff
- Jacques Henley as Le consul des États-Unis
- Charles Dullin as Mathésius
- Louis Jouvet as Simonis

Cast notes:

- Edward Lexy appears in a small part.

== See also ==
- Other films about the spy known as "Mademoiselle Docteur" or "Fräulein Doktor":
  - Stamboul Quest – 1934 American film starring Myrna Loy
  - Mademoiselle Doctor (also known as Under Secret Orders) – 1937 English film directed by Edmond T. Gréville, an English version of Street of Shadows, shot at the same time, but with some cast changes.
  - Fräulein Doktor – 1969 film, an Italian/Yugoslavian co-production
