= Fräulein Doktor (film) =

- US theatrical release poster
- Directed by: Alberto Lattuada
- Screenplay by: H.A.L. Craig; Vittoriano Petrilli; Alberto Lattuada; Uncredited: Duilio Coletti; Stanley Mann
- Story by: Vittoriano Petrilli
- Produced by: Dino De Laurentiis
- Starring: Suzy Kendall; Kenneth More; Nigel Green; Alexander Knox; Olivera Katarina; Capucine; James Booth
- Cinematography: Luigi Kuveiller
- Edited by: Nino Baragli
- Music by: Ennio Morricone
- Production companies: Avala Film; Dino De Laurentiis Cinematografica
- Distributed by: Paramount Pictures
- Release dates: 24 January 1969 (Italy); 15 May 1969 (U.S.)
- Running time: 104 minutes
- Countries: Yugoslavia; Italy
- Language: English

Fräulein Doktor is a 1969 spy film loosely based on the life of Elsbeth Schragmüller. It was an Italian and Yugoslavian co-production directed by Alberto Lattuada, starring Suzy Kendall and Kenneth More, and featuring Capucine, James Booth, Giancarlo Giannini and Nigel Green. It was produced by Dino De Laurentiis and has a music score by Ennio Morricone. It was distributed by Paramount Pictures in the United States.

== Plot ==
A woman spy and some male agents working for the Germans during World War I land at night near the Royal Navy base at Scapa Flow, from a U-boat. The British, led by Col. Foreman, ambush the landing party, capturing two of the men, but the woman gets away. Foreman fakes the execution of one of the spies, thus tricking the second one, Meyer, into becoming a double agent in the hopes of using him to capture his woman accomplice, whom Meyer identifies under the codename Fräulein Doktor. Fräulein Doktor is portrayed as a brilliant spy who stole a formula for a skin blistering gas similar to mustard gas which the Germans have since used to great effect against the Allies on the battlefield.

Meanwhile, Fräulein Doktor poses as a prostitute and seduces a laundryman to find out which ship Lord Kitchener will be sailing on to the Russian Empire, and when it will sail. She then helps a German U-boat to sink HMS Hampshire outside Scapa Flow with Kitchener on it, taking his life. For this, she is awarded the German Pour le Mérite. Meyer re-appears in Berlin and courts her. The German military intelligence service and its head, Col. Walter Nicolai, are suspicious of Meyer's escape from the British, but use him to poison Fräulein Doktor because of her addiction to morphine. Meyer is shown her dead body and later makes his way back to the British to confirm her death.

However, Fräulein Doktor's death was faked for Meyer's benefit so she would be free of suspicion for her next assignment, getting Allied defense plans for a German attack in Belgium. Under cover as a Spanish contessa, she recruits Spanish nurses to staff a hospital train to serve the Allied front. During the trip from Spain to France, she brings aboard German agents who will impersonate Belgian officers to infiltrate Belgian Army headquarters and steal the plans.

Col. Foreman is still not convinced of her death and shows up at the same army headquarters with Meyer in tow. The German agents steal the plans and in a deadly shootout with sentries, one gets away back to German lines. The Germans then launch their attack with great success, but Col. Foreman confronts Fräulein Doktor. Meyer kills Foreman but is in turn killed by the advancing German troops. Fräulein Doktor is then whisked away by the Germans, but suffers a breakdown as she is being driven off through all the carnage and death about her.

== Cast ==
- Suzy Kendall as Fräulein Doktor
- Kenneth More as Colonel Foreman
- Capucine as Dr. Saforet
- James Booth as Meyer
- Alexander Knox as General Peronne
- Nigel Green as Colonel Mathesius
- Giancarlo Giannini as Lt. Hans Ruppert
- Ralph Nossek as Lean agent

== Production and release ==
Location shooting took place in Yugoslavia and Hungary. The set for the final battle sequence was one of the most ambitious constructs of no man's land ever filmed.

The film was released in Yugoslavia under the name Gospođica Doktor − špijunka bez imena, and in Italy as Fraulein Doktor. In the United States, consideration was given to the possible titles Nameless and The Betrayal.

Suzy Kendall was a casting choice reflecting Virginia McKenna's portrayal of the French-born Violette Szabo in the 1958 WW2 action drama Carve Her Name with Pride.

== Home media ==
In 2011 Fräulein Doktor was released on DVD by Underground Empire, most likely a bootleg. Other screenshots of the film which can be found online frequently refer to a Finnish airing on Yle Teema.

The soundtrack by Ennio Morricone was released on its own in 2010 by Intermezzo Media.

== See also ==
- Elsbeth Schragmüller
- Other films about the spy known as "Mademoiselle Docteur" or "Fräulein Doktor":
  - Stamboul Quest – 1934 American film starring Myrna Loy
  - Mademoiselle Docteur (also known as Salonique, nid d’espions and Street of Shadows) – 1937 French film directed by G.W. Pabst
  - Mademoiselle Doctor (also known as Under Secret Orders) – 1937 English film directed by Edmond T. Gréville, an English version of the above, shot at the same time, but with some cast changes.
