= Travels in the Congo (book) =

Travel diary by André Gide

Travels in the Congo (French: Voyage au Congo) is a travel diary by the French author André Gide. It was published 1927 by Gallimard in France. It is often published together with another one of his travel diaries called Return from Chad (French: Retour du Tchad).

It describes his journey that started in July 1926 and ended in May 1927, during which he travelled through the French Equatorial Africa colony and then successively to Middle Congo (now the Republic of the Congo), Ubangi-Shari (now the Central African Republic), briefly to Chad and then to Cameroon before returning to France.

== Journey ==
During World War I, Gide met the young Marc Allégret and they became lovers and companions. In 1925 they embarked on an African expedition together and stayed in French Equatorial Africa for ten months. The duo sailed from Bordeaux on 18 July 1925. Their first port in Africa was Dakar, which Gide found to be "gloomy", ugly, and lacking in exoticism. He found their next stop, Conakry, more pleasant. The duo left their ship in the port of Matadi, then followed a train route to Kinshasa, and finally reached Brazzaville on 14 August. They used it for a while as the base for their excursions. The duo would soon sail on the Congo River. Their months-long expedition included travels through the Ubangi-Shari, Lake Chad, and the French Cameroons. They sailed from Africa on 14 May 1926.

== Other observations ==
Apart from describing his journey he also criticized the behavior of French business interests in the Congo and inspired reform. In particular, he strongly criticized the Large Concessions regime (French: régime des Grandes Concessions), i.e., a regime according to which part of the colony was conceded to French companies and where these companies could exploit all of the area's natural resources, in particular rubber (caoutchouc). He related, for instance, how natives were forced to leave their village for several weeks to collect rubber in the forest, and went as far as comparing their exploitation to slavery.

Gide believed in the civilising mission of Europeans, but was not convinced by its implementation : "It is truly deplorable to see children all over the colony, so alert, so eager to learn, so miserably served by such inadequate teachers. If only we could send them appropriate books and school charts! But what's the point of teaching the children of these equatorial regions that ‘slow-burning stoves are very dangerous’, as I heard them taught in Nola, or that ‘our ancestors, the Gauls, lived in caves’. These unfortunate native teachers often do their best, but wouldn't it be decent, at least at Fort-Archambault, to send a French teacher with a proper command of our language ? Most of the children at Fort-Archambault, who have contact with the colonists, know French better than their teacher, who can only teach them mistakes."

He was capable of self-deprecating humour : "A player of a strange instrument: a calabash, held between the legs, in the middle of a bamboo, like a bow stretched over six (?) strings. He sings with great subtlety, delicacy and nuance, what our interpreter translates as: ‘I've got so many jigger fleas in my foot, I can't walk any more’.

== Reception ==
The book had important influence on anti-colonialism movements in France and helped re-evaluate the impact of colonialism.

== Sources ==
- Berliner, Brett A. (2002), Ambivalent Desire: The Exotic Black Other in Jazz-age France, University of Massachusetts Press, ISBN 978-1558493568
- Bowles, Brett (2013), "Allégret, Marc", in Aitken, Ian (ed.), The Conscice Routledge Encyclopedia of the Documentary Film, Routledge, ISBN 978-1136512063
- Sheridan, Alan (1999), André Gide: A Life in the Present, Harvard University Press, ISBN 978-0674035270
