= Marcel Achard =

French writer (1899–1974)

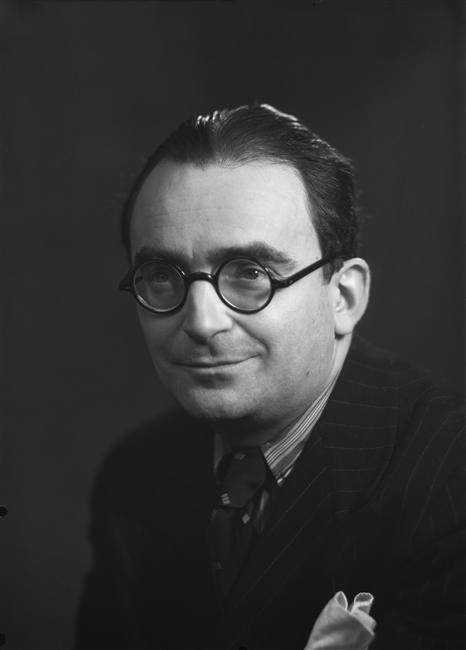
- Achard in 1936
- Born: Marcel-Auguste Ferréol; 5 July 1899; Sainte-Foy-lès-Lyon, France
- Died: 4 September 1974 (aged 75); Paris, France
- Writing career
- Genres: plays and screenplays
- Notable awards: Académie française

Marcel Achard (French: [maʁsɛl aʃaʁ]; 5 July 1899 – 4 September 1974) was a French playwright and screenwriter whose popular sentimental comedies maintained his position as a highly recognizable name in his france's theatrical and literary circles for five decades. He was elected to the Académie française in 1959.

== Themes and variations within a philosophical outlook ==
A native of the Rhône département's Urban Community of Lyon, France's second largest metropolitan area, Marcel-Auguste Ferréol was born in Sainte-Foy-lès-Lyon, one of the city's suburbs, and adopted his pen name at the start of his writing career in the early 1920s. Able to absorb knowledge quickly, he became, in 1916, in the midst of World War I, a village schoolteacher at the age of 17. In 1919, a few months after the end of the war, the 20-year-old aspiring writer arrived in Paris and found jobs as a prompter at the Théâtre du Vieux-Colombier and as a journalist for various publications, including the major daily newspaper, Le Figaro.

Marcel Achard wrote his first play in 1922 and had a major success the following year when renowned actor-director Charles Dullin staged his play Voulez-vous jouer avec moâ? [Will You Play with Me?], a sensitively delicate comedy about circus and its clowns, casting the playwright in a small part, as one of the clowns. The production set a pattern for the remainder of his theatrical output, most of which can be considered as 20th century reworkings of stock characters and situations from the Italian traditional Commedia dell'arte. The personages of Pierrot and Columbine are transported into modern-day settings and inserted into an occasionally mawkish or nostalgic love plot with equal doses of laughter mingled with pain and regret.

These themes were expanded upon in two of his most popular plays of the period—1929's Jean de la Lune [John of the Moon a/k/a The Dreamer] and 1932's Domino. Jean showed how the unwavering trust of Jef, the faithful Pierrot prototype, transforms his scandalously adulterous wife into his idealized image of her, while Domino presented another unfaithful wife who pays a gigolo to make a pretense of courting her so as to distract her husband from her real lover, but the gigolo manages to act his character with such pretend sincerity that she winds up falling in love with this fictional persona.

The distinctive quality of Achard's plays was their dreamlike mood of sentimental melancholy, underscored by the very titles which were primarily taken from popular bittersweet songs of the day. 1924's Marlbrough s'en va-t-en guerre [Marlborough Gets Himself Off to War], 1935's Noix de coco [Coconuts], 1946's Auprès de ma blonde [Close to My Girlfriend] and Savez-vous planter les choux? [Do You Know How to Plant Cabbage?] and 1948's Nous irons à Valparaiso [We're Going to Valparaíso] are among some examples of this specific style.

== Career peak in the interwar period ==
Achard's greatest successes and popularity were in the period between the two World Wars when contemporary critics favorably compared him to some of his renowned French predecessors such as Pierre de Marivaux and Alfred de Musset. Postwar pundits were not as kind, pointing out the rather narrow scope of human psyche that he represented and deprecatingly referring to him as a "spécialiste de l'amour" ["love specialist"] for the sickly-sweet characteristics of his poetic imagination.

The critics focused, of course, on Achard's most popular plays, disregarding the fact that the reason Achard continued to write them is precisely because they met with such unvarying success. His less-well known works, however, show innovative techniques and original themes. 1929's La Belle Marinière [The Beautiful Lady of the Canals a/k/a The Beautiful Bargewoman] still has some of the excessively-poetic dialogue, but is overall a realistic play about a love triangle involving a bargeman, his wife and his best friend and companion. Similarly, 1933's La femme en blanc [The Woman in White] uses a then-new technique of recreating for the audience events as they are being described by the play's characters. In 1938's Le corsaire [The Privateer], a "play-in-a-play" device, pioneered by Luigi Pirandello, depicts film actors portraying the life of a long-ago pirate, finding themselves caught in an endless loop of similarities. The same year saw the production of his most controversial play, Adam, which strove to give insight into the conflicted emotions of an unhappy homosexual. Although the very subject matter caused it to be considered scandalous at the time, its brief revival three decades later, in the open and radicalized culture of the late 1960s, when the author was approaching his 70th birthday, found the once-ahead-of-its-time work judged as a tame and dated period piece below Achard's usual literary standard.

== Successful postwar plays ==
After World War II, despite the criticism, Achard's literary output continued unabated. Among his most successful later plays were 1952's Les compagnons de la Marjolaine [The Companions of Marjoram] and 1955's Le mal d'amour [Love Sickness]. The greatest popularity, however, was achieved by a 1957 comedy about a testy, ill-tempered character nicknamed Patate [Spud] and a 1962 comic mystery L'Idiote [The Idiot], best known in America as the basis for the play and film A Shot in the Dark.

Four of Achard's plays also had Broadway runs. Domino, adapted by actress-writer Grace George, opened at the Playhouse Theatre on 16 August 1932 and closed after seven performances. The title role went to Rod La Rocque, a top star of the silent cinema, whose career was on the wane following the advent of the talkies, and the lead actress was Jessie Royce Landis. Seventeen years later, a much better run was enjoyed by Auprès de ma blonde, which was reworked by S. N. Behrman into I Know My Love. It opened at the Shubert Theatre on 2 November 1949 and ran for 247 performances, closing on 3 June 1950. It was directed by and starred Alfred Lunt and his leading lady was, as always, his wife, Lynn Fontanne. Nine years after that premiere, however, Patate, which played to sold-out theaters in Paris, could not translate its elusive charm to American audiences and repeated the seven-performance fiasco of the previous single-name character, Domino. The fellow whose nickname made up the title was played by Tom Ewell, and the female lead, Susan Oliver, won the Theatre World Award for her performance, while the Irwin Shaw adaptation opened at Henry Miller's Theatre on 28 October 1958 and closed on November 1. Ultimately, it would be A Shot in the Dark, three years later, which would boast the longest run. Adapted by Harry Kurnitz and directed by Harold Clurman, it racked up an impressive 389 performances, opening at the Booth Theatre on 18 October 1961 and closing on 22 September 1962. The stars were Julie Harris, Walter Matthau and William Shatner.

Achard's numerous screenplays, frequently centering on relatively recent historical events and personalities, include 1936's Mayerling, 1938's Orage and 1942's Félicie Nanteuil. He presided over the Cannes Film Festival in 1958 and 1959 and had a similar role at the Venice Film Festival in 1960. It was also in 1959 that he was finally, at the age of 60, elected to the Académie française.

== Death ==
Marcel Achard died of diabetes in his Paris home two months after his 75th birthday. He was survived by his wife, Lily.

== Filmography ==
- Jean de la Lune, directed by Jean Choux (France, 1931, based on the play Jean de la Lune)
- Mistigri, directed by Harry Lachman (France, 1931, based on the play Mistigri)
- The Beautiful Sailor, directed by Harry Lachman (France, 1932, based on the play La Belle Marinière)
- Cocoanut, directed by Jean Boyer (France, 1939, based on the play Noix de coco)
- The Strange Monsieur Victor (1938)
- Life Begins Today, directed by Schamyl Bauman (Sweden, 1939, based on the play Pétrus)
- Domino, directed by Roger Richebé (France, 1943, based on the play Domino)
- Pétrus, directed by Marc Allégret (France, 1946, based on the play Pétrus)
- Jean de la Lune, directed by Marcel Achard (France, 1949, based on the play Jean de la Lune)
- A Shot in the Dark, directed by Blake Edwards (1964, based on the play L'Idiote)
- Patate, directed by Robert Thomas (France, 1964, based on the play Patate)
