= Marc Allégret =

French screenwriter and film director (1900–1973)

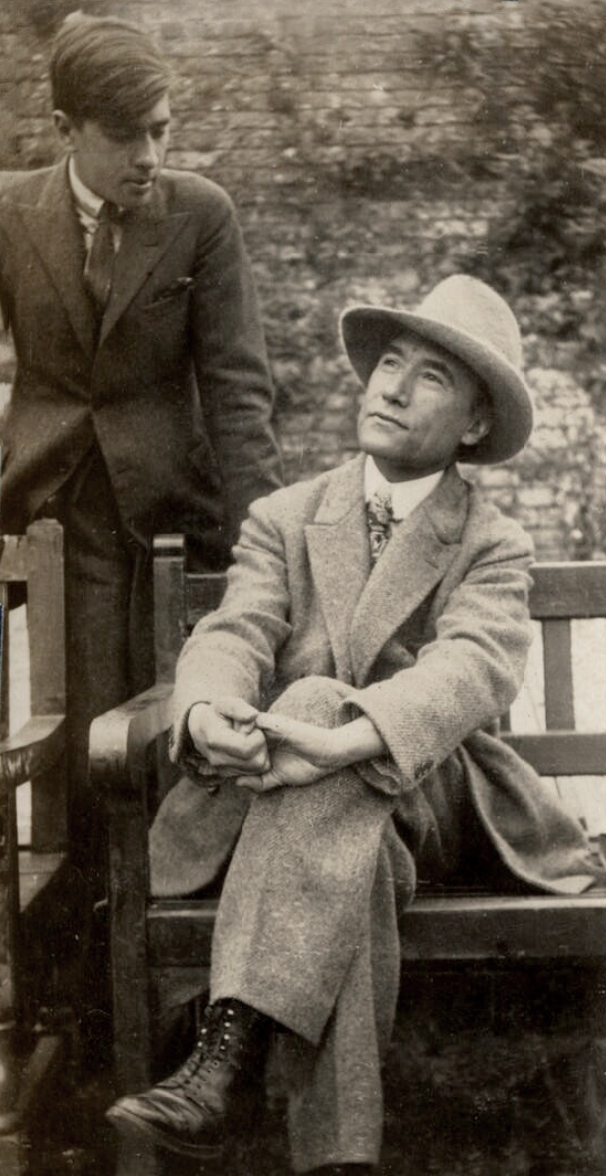
- Allégret (left) with André Gide in 1920 (photo by Lady Ottoline Morrell)
- Born: 22 December 1900; Basel, Basel-Stadt, Switzerland
- Died: 3 November 1973 (aged 72); Paris, France
- Occupations: Screenwriter; film director
- Years active: 1927–1970
- Father: Élie Allégret
- Relatives: Yves Allégret (brother)

Marc Allégret (French: [maʁk aleɡʁɛ]; 22 December 1900 – 3 November 1973) was a French screenwriter, photographer and film director.

== Biography ==
Born in Basel, Basel-Stadt, Switzerland, he was the elder brother of Yves Allégret. Marc was educated to be a lawyer in Paris, but while accompanying his lover André Gide on a trip in 1927 to the Congo in Africa, he recorded the trip on film, after which he chose to pursue a career in the motion picture industry. He is credited with helping develop the careers of Simone Simon, Michèle Morgan, Jean-Pierre Aumont, Danièle Delorme, Odette Joyeux, Jeanne Moreau, Brigitte Bardot, Jean-Paul Belmondo, Raimu, Gérard Philipe, Louis Jourdan, and Roger Vadim.

Allégret collaborated on the famous Dada Marcel Duchamp short film Anemic Cinema in 1926 and served as an assistant director to Robert Florey and Augusto Genina. In 1931 he directed his first feature film, Mam’zelle Nitouche. He received acclaim for his subsequent film Fanny and went on to a long career during which he wrote numerous scripts and directed more than fifty films.

Allégret died in 1973 and was interred in the Cimetière des Gonards in Versailles, France.

== Filmography ==
- 1927 : Travels in the Congo (documentary)
- 1930 : La Meilleure Bobonne (short)
- 1931 : Mam'zelle Nitouche
- 1931 : J'ai quelque chose à vous dire (short)
- 1931 : Attaque nocturne (short)
- 1931 : The Lovers of Midnight
- 1931 : Black and White
- 1932 : La Petite Chocolatière
- 1932 : Fanny
- 1934 : Zouzou
- 1934 : Hotel Free Exchange
- 1934 : Lac aux dames
- 1934 : Sans famille
- 1935 : Beautiful Days
- 1936 : Under Western Eyes
- 1936 : Adventure in Paris
- 1936 : The Terrible Lovers
- 1937 : Gribouille
- 1937 : Woman of Malacca
- 1937 : Another World (German-language version of Woman of Malacca)
- 1938 : Orage
- 1938 : Entrée des artistes
- 1939 : Le Corsaire
- 1941 : Parade en sept nuits
- 1942 : L'Arlésienne
- 1942 : The Beautiful Adventure
- 1943 : Les Deux timides
- 1944 : Les Petites du quai aux fleurs
- 1945 : Félicie Nanteuil
- 1946 : Lunegarde
- 1946 : Pétrus
- 1947 : Blanche Fury
- 1950 : Blackmailed
- 1950 : Maria Chapdelaine
- 1951 : Avec André Gide (documentary)
- 1952 : La Demoiselle et son revenant
- 1953 : Julietta
- 1954 : Loves of Three Queens
- 1955 : School for Love
- 1955 : Lady Chatterley's Lover
- 1956 : En effeuillant la marguerite a.k.a. Plucking the Daisy a.k.a. Mademoiselle Striptease
- 1957 : Love Is at Stake
- 1958 : Be Beautiful But Shut Up
- 1958 : Sunday Encounter
- 1959 : Les Affreux
- 1961 : Midnight Folly
- 1962 : Tales of Paris
- 1963 : L'Abominable Homme des douanes
- 1966 : Lumière (documentary)
- 1970 : Le Bal du Comte d'Orgel
