= Jean Gobet =

French actor (1888–1980)

- Born: Joseph, Paul, Louis Gobet; 20 July 1888; Mornant
- Died: 29 April 1980 (aged 91); Créteil
- Occupation: Actor

Jean Gobet (20 July 1888 – 29 April 1980) was a French stage and film actor.

== Filmography ==
=== Cinema ===
- 1928: Les Fourchambault by Georges Monca
- 1931: L'Amour à l'américaine by Claude Heymann
- 1931: Coiffeur pour dames by René Guissart – Gaetan
- 1931: La Couturière de Luneville by Harry Lachmann
- 1931: The Man at Midnight by Harry Lachmann – Mr. Durand Toucourt
- 1931: The Chocolate Girl by Marc Allégret – Hector
- 1931: You Will Be a Duchess by René Guissart – the doctor
- 1931: Isolons-nous Octave by Marc Allégret – short film –
- 1931: Le Seul Bandit du village by Robert Bossis – short film –
- 1932: Baby by Carl Lamac and Pierre Billon
- 1932: The Yellow Dog by Jean Tarride – the salesman
- 1932: Kiki by Carl Lamac and Pierre Billon
- 1932: Ma femme... homme d'affaires by Max de Vaucorbeil – the impresario
- 1932: Austerlitz 24-22 by André Bay – short film
- 1932: La Der des ders by Jean Caret – short film
- 1932: En plein dans le mille by André Chotin – Octave
- 1932: La Méthode Crollington by André Bay – short film
- 1932: Mimi Pandore by Roger Capellani
- 1932: Ordonnance malgré lui by Maurice Cammage – Le vicomte de Marchevieule
- 1933: L'Ordonnance by Victor Tourjansky
- 1933: Les Surprises du sleeping by Karl Anton
- 1933: Trois hommes en habit by Mario Bonnard – André
- 1933: La Voix sans visage by Leo Mittler – the servant
- 1933: Je suis un homme perdu by Edmond T. Gréville
- 1933: My Hat by Lucien Jaquelux – short film
- 1934: On a trouvé une femme nue by Léo Joannon – Robert
- 1934: The Midnight Prince by René Guissart
- 1934: Si j'étais le patron by Richard Pottier – a shareholder
- 1935: Baccara by Yves Mirande and Léonide Moguy (first assistant-director) – the friendly journalist
- 1935: Quadrille d'amour by Richard Eichberg and Germain Fried – Georges's friend
- 1935: La Route impériale by Marcel L'Herbier – the barman
- 1936: With a Smile by Maurice Tourneur – Bruzin
- 1936: The King by Pierre Colombier – Rivelot
- 1937: Alexis, Gentleman Chauffeur by Max de Vaucorbeil – the make-up artist
- 1937: Mon député et sa femme by Maurice Cammage
- 1938: La Marraine du régiment by Gabriel Rosca
- 1938: Tricoche and Cacolet by Pierre Colombier – Breloque, the secretary
- 1941: Caprices by Léo Joannon
- 1942: Mermoz by Louis Cuny
- 1943: Le Bal des passants by Guillaume Radot – Jean Lamire
- 1945: Vingt-quatre heures de perm' by Maurice Cloche – the dramaturge
- 1945: Messieurs Ludovic by Jean-Paul Le Chanois – Benoist
- 1950: The New Masters by Paul Nivoix
- 1953: Les Détectives du dimanche by Claude Orval

=== Television ===
- 1965: Le Théâtre de la jeunesse: Sans-souci ou Le Chef-d'œuvre de Vaucanson by Albert Husson, TV director Jean-Pierre Decourt

== Theatre ==
- 1921: Vive Boulbasse by Régis Gignoux, Théâtre du Grand-Guignol
- 1923: L'Appel du clown by Régis Gignoux, Théâtre du Grand-Guignol
- 1934: L'Été by Jacques Natanson, mise en scène Marcel André, Nouvelle Comédie
- 1935: Les Fontaines lumineuses by Georges Berr and Louis Verneuil, Théâtre des Variétés
- 1947: Ruy Blas by Victor Hugo, mise en scène Pierre Dux, Comédie-Française
- 1950: Mort pour rien by Alfred Fabre-Luce, mise en scène René Rocher, Théâtre de l'Œuvre
- 1952: N'écoutez pas, mesdames ! by Sacha Guitry, mise en scène by the author, Théâtre des Variétés
- 1955: La Monnaie de ses rêves by André Ransan, mise en scène René Rocher, Théâtre du Grand-Guignol
- 1955: La Tueuse by André-Paul Antoine, Théâtre du Grand-Guignol
- 1956: Je suis seule ce soir by André-Paul Antoine, mise en scène René Rocher, Théâtre du Grand-Guignol
- 1956: Meurtre au ralenti by Boileau-Narcejac, mise en scène Alfred Pasquali, Théâtre du Grand-Guignol
