= Lysiane Rey =

French actress (1922–1975)

- Born: 13 November 1922; Amiens, France
- Died: 1 October 1975 (aged 52); Maisons-Laffitte, France
- Occupation: Actress
- Children: Patrick Préjean
- Relatives: Laura Préjean (granddaughter)

Lysiane Rey (Jacqueline, Andrée, Albertine, Louise Leharanger) (13 November 1922 – 1 October 1975) was a French actress. With Albert Préjean she was the mother of actor Patrick Préjean, and the grandmother of actress Laura Préjean.

== Early life ==
Rey was born on 13 November 1922 in Amiens.

== Death ==
Rey died on 1 October 1975 in Maisons-Laffitte.

== Filmography ==
- 1941 : Strange Suzy by Pierre-Jean Ducis
- 1941 : A Woman in the Night by Edmond T. Gréville
- 1942 : Six Little Girls in White by Yvan Noé
- 1943 : After the Storm by Pierre-Jean Ducis
- 1943 : White Wings by Robert Péguy
- 1947 : The Secret of Florida by Jacques Houssin
- 1947 : The Three Cousins by Jacques Daniel-Norman
- 1950 : Mademoiselle Josette, My Woman by André Berthomieu
- 1950 : The Happy Man by Gilles Grangier
- 1950 : The King of Camelots by André Berthomieu
- 1951 : Sins of Madeleine by Henri Lepage
- 1951 : Duel in Dakar by Claude Orval and Georges Combret
- 1952 : Sins of Paris by Henri Lepage
- 1952 : My Priest Among the Rich by Henri Diamant-Berger
- 1952 : Minuit quai de Bercy by Christian Stengel
- 1955 : Your Turn, Callaghan by Willy Rozier
- 1957 : Élisa by Roger Richebé
- 1959 : Vers l'extase by René Wheeler
- 1965 : Quand passent les faisans by Edouard Molinaro
