= Argai: The Prophecy =

- Genre: Adventure; Science fantasy
- Written by: Sébastien Dorsey
- Directed by: Jean-César Suchorski
- Starring: Bruno Choel; Marie-Christine Adam; Christian Alers; Benoît Allemane
- Voices of: French version: Jean Topart; Bruno Choel; Laura Préjean; Marie-Christine Adam; Henri Labussière; Patricia Legrand; Patrick Préjean; Benoît Allemane; Jean Barney
- Composer: Didier Julia
- Country of origin: France
- Original language: French
- No. of seasons: 1
- No. of episodes: 26

Production
- Producers: Didier Julia; Claude Carrere
- Production companies: Carrére Groupe; D'Ocon Films Productions; La Coloniale

Original release
- Network: TF1
- Release: 2 September 2000 – 4 March 2001

Argai: The Prophecy (Original French title: Argaï: La prophétie) is a 2000 French animated series (with 26 episodes) directed by Jean-César Suchorski and written by Sébastien Dorsey.

== Plot ==
The story is partly set in the year 1250, partly in 2075. Angel, the fiancée of Prince Argaï, is under the spell of the Dark Queen. The evil Queen steals the youth of juvenile women and keeps them asleep for the rest of their lives. This way, she remains immortal. To save his fiancée, Argaï travels through time and meets detective Oscar Lightbulb, his assistant Barnaby and his secretary, Moony Moon. They decide to help Argaï with his battle against the queen and the rescue of his beloved. To defeat the queen, they have to awaken Angel with an antidote which contains 13 unique ingredients. Their first challenge is to find each of these ingredients.

Unlike most stories involving time travel, when a character is killed in a time that is not their own, they are returned to their own time instead of dying. This is why it is necessary for Queen Orial to kill Argaï in 1250, as it would not be permanent otherwise.

== Broadcast ==
The series was premiered on 2 September 2000 on TF1 in France. In the UK, the show airs on Disney Channel from 15 April 2001 to September 2002. In Italy, the show airs on Fox Kids and Jetix. In Spain, the show airs on La 1, Antena 3, and Clan. In the Middle East, the show airs on Spacetoon.

== Episodes ==
1. Chapter I. Prince Argai
2. Chapter II. The Man in the Mask
3. Chapter III. New York, 2075
4. Chapter IV. F-107
5. Chapter V. The Great Journey
6. Chapter VI. Notre-Dame de Paris
7. Chapter VII. The Mandrake
8. Chapter VIII. The Pharaoh's Amulet
9. Chapter IX. The Road to the Crusades
10. Chapter X. Alyasha
11. Chapter XI. Venice Submerged
12. Chapter XII. Brother Tich's Escape
13. Chapter XIII. The Enchanted Forest
14. Chapter XIV. In the Land of the Celts
15. Chapter XV. Lotus Flower
16. Chapter XVI. The Desert of Awikango
17. Chapter XVII. The Monastery of Tirloch
18. Chapter XVIII. The Knight Tournament
19. Chapter XIX. The Great Escape
20. Chapter XX. The Wild Orchid
21. Chapter XXI. The Sacred Pearl
22. Chapter XXII. The Thurible
23. Chapter XXIII. The Fairy Melusine
24. Chapter XXIV. The White Lady
25. Chapter XXV. Angele
26. Chapter XXVI. The Final Combat

== Cast ==
- Jean Topart - Monk
- Bruno Choël - Argaï
- Christian Alers - Oscar Lightbulb
- Laura Préjean - Angèle
- Marie-Christine Adam - The Dark Queen
- Henri Labussière - Hugsley Barnes
- Patricia Legrand - Miss Moon
- Patrick Préjean - Barnaby
- Benoît Allemane - Pacha
- Jean Barney - King Khar (Argaï's father)
- Michel Vigné - Narrator, the Devil
