= Maryse Paillet =

French actress and singer

Maryse Paillet born in Limoges and died at an indeterminate date after 1970, was a French singer and actress.

== Life ==
Virtually nothing is known about Maryse Paillet other than that she first embarked on an operatic career as a soprano soloist from 1926 both on stage and on the airwaves before turning to the theatre after the Liberation of France and to the big and small screen in the very early 1950s.

Her trail is lost after a final role in Mauregard, a television series broadcast in October–November 1970 on the second channel of the ORTF.

== Opera ==
- 1926: Le Moulin de Javelle, comic opera in 1 act by Paul Henrion, libretto by Ernest Grenet-Dancourt, at the Salle des Fêtes in Armentières (21 March)
- 1928: Messe Saint-Georges, for choir, soloists and orchestra by Georges Ghestem, in the church of Saint-Charles in Lille (15 January)
- 1928: Ève, oratorio in 4 parts by Jules Massenet, libretto by Louis Gallet, at the Hippodrome Lillois (13 mai) : Ève.

== Theatre ==
- 1946: La Cinquantaine, popular scene in 1 act by Georges Courteline, directed by Georges Vitaly, Théâtre de Poche Montparnasse (January).
- 1946: Amphitryon, 3-act comedy by Molière, setting by Yves Bonnat, Théâtre des Noctambules (24 January)
- 1947: L’Ombre d’un franc-tireur, tragic comedy in 2 acts by Seán O'Casey (The Shadow of a Gunman), French adaptation by Philippe Kellerson, directed by André Clavé, Théâtre Tristan-Bernard (12 January).
- 1948: Boubouroche / Théodore cherche des allumettes, Les Boulingrin, one-act play by Courteline, directed by André Clavé, Guy Piérauld and Julien Verdier, au Centre dramatique de l'Est in Colmar (January)
- 1948: The Government Inspector, comedy in 5 acts by Nikolai Gogol, French adaptation and staging by André Barsacq, Théâtre de l'Atelier (23 November) : Fevronia Petrovna Pochliopkina
- 1949: Le Miracle de l'homme pauvre, play in 3 acts and 5 scenes by Marian Hemar, French adaptation by Cécil Robson, directed by André Clavé, Théâtre municipal de Mulhouse (7 December)
- 1950: À chacun selon sa faim, play in 3 acts by Jean Mogin, directed by Raymond Hermantier, Théâtre du Vieux-Colombier (17 February)
- 1950: Junon et le paon, tragedy in 3 acts by Sean O'Casey (Juno and the Paycock), French adaptation and direction by Philippe Kellerson, Théâtre de l'Œuvre (September).
- 1952: Philippe et Jonas, 2-act play by Irwin Shaw (The Gentle People), French adaptation by Marcel Duhamel, directed by Jean-Pierre Grenier, Théâtre de la Gaîté-Montparnasse (20 December) : Angelina Esposito
- 1953: Azouk, comedy in ten scenes by Alexandre Rivemale, directed by Jean-Pierre Grenier, Théâtre Fontaine (22 December) : Amélie
- 1955: Poppi, 2-act comedy by Georges Sonnier, directed by Pierre Valde, Théâtre des Arts (February)
- 1955: Le Mariage de Barillon, vaudeville in 3 acts by Georges Feydeau and Maurice Desvallières, directed by René Dupuy, Théâtre Gramont (19 June)
- 1956: Nemo, 3-act play by Alexandre Rivemale, directed by Jean-Pierre Grenier, music by Louis Bessières, Théâtre Marigny (3 October) : Léontine
- 1957: Le Nouveau Locataire, one act play by Eugène Ionesco, directed by Robert Postec, Théâtre d'Aujourd'hui (10 September) : la concierge
- 1960: La Petite datcha, 3-act comedy by Vassili Chkvarkine, French adaptation by Georges Soria, Théâtre Daunou (7 September) : Olga Karaoulova

== Film ==
- 1950: Un homme marche dans la ville by Marcello Pagliero - Tantine
- 1950: Plus de vacances pour le Bon Dieu by Robert Vernay
- 1951: Boîte à vendre by Claude Lalande - short film -
- 1950: Justice est faite by André Cayatte
- 1950: Under the Sky of Paris by Julien Duvivier - Mme Milou
- 1951: Passion by Georges Lampin
- 1951: Dupont Barbès by Henri Lepage
- 1952: La Maison dans la dune by Georges Lampin
- 1952: Monsieur Leguignon Lampiste by Maurice Labro
- 1952: Trois femmes by André Michel - La servante
- 1952: Brelan d'as by Henri Verneuil - Une concierge
- 1952: Nous sommes tous des assassins by André Cayatte
- 1952: Piédalu fait des miracles by Jean Loubignac
- 1952: Le Banquet des fraudeurs by Henri Storck - Kobi
- 1953: Les Compagnes de la nuit by Ralph Habib - L'employée
- 1954: Crainquebille by Ralph Habib - Mme Lateigne
- 1953: Their Last Night by Georges Lacombe - Marie, la femme du marinier
- 1954: Piédalu député by Jean Loubignac
- 1954: Le Comte de Monte-Cristo, film en 2 parties de Robert Vernay : Valentine
- 1955: Rififi by Jules Dassin - La mère de Charlie
- 1955: : Fantaisie d'un jour by Pierre Cardinal
- 1955: Les Hommes en blanc, de Ralph Habib - Une paysanne
- 1956: Maid in Paris by Pierre Gaspard-Huit
- 1955: Sophie et le Crime by Pierre Gaspard-Huit
- 1956: Mannequins de Paris by André Hunebelle
- 1956: La Traversée de Paris by Claude Autant-Lara - Une femme au restaurant
- 1956: Les Truands by Carlo Rim
- 1958: Maigret tend un piège by Jean Delannoy - Une bouchère
- 1960: Trique, gamin de Paris by Marco de Gastyne
- 1962: Tartarin of Tarascon by Francis Blanche and Raoul André - Berthe Fracca
- 1963: Tante Aurore viendra ce soir / L'Araignée, short film by Claude Pierson : Mme Baju, la concierge

== Television ==
- 1956: Plaisir du théâtre, television series in 29 episodes, episode Inspecteur Grey by Jean Kerchbron : Victoire, la cuisinière
- 1956: En votre âme et conscience, television series in 64 episodes, episode Le serrurier de Sannois by Claude Barma : Madame Mazy
- 1958: Le Tour de France par deux enfants, television series in 39 episodes, episode Pris au piège by Jean Limousin and William Magnin
- 1960: L'Empire céleste, play by Michel Subiela, directed by Georges Folgoas (15 March) : Madame Prêtre
- 1961: Le Massacre des innocents, play by William Saroyan, directed by Roland-Bernard (12 December) : May
- 1964: Thierry la Fronde, television series in 52 episodes, episode L'enfant d'Édouard by Robert Guez : Dame Bertrade
- 1967: Le Théâtre de la jeunesse, television series in 36 episodes, episode Les deux nigauds by René Lucot (1 January) : Madame Courtemiche.
- 1970: Mauregard, television series in 6 episodes by Claude de Givray, episode 1940 : le temps des colères (29 October) : la dame à la messe
