= Asterix and the Big Fight (film) =

1989 French animated film

- Theatrical release poster
- Astérix et le coup du menhir
- Directed by: Philippe Grimond
- Written by: Adolf Kabatek; Yannik Voight
- Based on: Asterix and the Big Fight; Asterix and the Soothsayer by René Goscinny; Albert Uderzo
- Produced by: Yannick Piel
- Starring: Roger Carel; Pierre Tornade; Julien Guiomar; Marie-Anne Chazel; Henri Labussière; Roger Lumont
- Narrated by: Tony Jay (U.S. Dub)
- Music by: Michel Colombier
- Production companies: Dargaud Films; Les Productions René Goscinny; Extrafilm Produktion GmbH
- Distributed by: Gaumont Distribution
- Release date: October 4, 1989
- Running time: 81 minutes
- Countries: France; West Germany
- Language: French

Asterix and the Big Fight (French: Astérix et le coup du menhir) is a 1989 French-German animated film directed by Philippe Grimond and produced by Yannick Piel. It is the sixth animated film based on the Asterix comic series. The story combines the plots of Asterix and the Big Fight and Asterix and the Soothsayer: despite sharing the same English title as the former book, the film is primarily an adaptation of the latter and does not involve the titular "Big Fight". In the film, Getafix is accidentally made insane and amnesiac by Obelix, forcing Asterix to try to cure him as his village is deceived by a fraudulent soothsayer that works for the Romans. A novelization of the film was released in English under the title Operation Getafix, possibly to avoid confusion with the original comic book but generating instead confusion as to the film's title.

== Plot ==
The Romans try to capture Druid Getafix, as part of their plan to deprive a rebel village of Gauls from the magic potion that gives them super-human strength. When Asterix and Obelix attempt a rescue, Obelix throws and accidentally hits Getafix with a menhir in the resulting chaos, causing him to develop amnesia and insanity. While the village comes to grip with this, Prolix, a conman posing as a soothsayer, arrives during a storm and begins deceiving some of the superstitious and credulous villagers into believing a number of his prophecies, which he predicts in exchange for food and drink (later gold).

Knowing that Romans will quickly realise that the village is in trouble without the magic potion, Asterix and Vitalstatistix desperately attempt to have Getafix brew some. His concoctions quickly prove problematic and alert one of the local Roman garrisons into sending a spy into the village. Despite being camouflaged, the legionary is captured and used as a guinea pig for some of Getafix's creations. One of these makes him lighter than air, causing him to float away back to the Roman camp, where he reports their problem. The Romans send a patrol to investigate and in the forest come across Prolix, whom they capture. Although orders from Rome state that all Gaulish soothsayers are to be arrested, the garrison's centurion is convinced of Prolix's abilities and uses him to chase away the villagers.

Returning to the village, Prolix foretells doom if the village is not abandoned. Everyone leaves for a nearby island, except for Asterix, Obelix, Dogmatix and Getafix. Shortly after the Romans move in, Getafix brews a very noxious potion whose vapors engulf the village, both restoring his memories and sanity after he accidentally drinks some and driving off the Romans in the belief that Prolix's prediction has come true. Getafix quickly brews the magic potion and convinces the villagers to test the soothsayer's abilities by having them attack the Roman camp. Because he didn't predict the Gauls storming the camp, Prolix is revealed to be a fake; during the battle (led by the women of the village, whom Prolix had deceived the most), Prolix is flattened by another menhir thrown by Obelix and loses his mind. In the aftermath of the battle, the centurion is demoted to soldier for his failure and now ordered by his Optio (now in command) to clean up the damage, the demented Prolix is also ordered to leave the camp and the still-floating legionary happily flies away as the village returns to normal.

== Cast ==
Character	Original	English Dub	
Character	Original	U.K. Version (1990)	U.S. Version (1995)
Asterix	Roger Carel	Bill Oddie	Henry Winkler
Dogmatix	Roger Carel	Roger Carel	Roger Carel
Obelix	Pierre Tornade	Bernard Bresslaw	Rosey Grier
Getafix	Henri Labussière	Peter Hawkins	Danny Mann (Vitamix)
Decurion Totalapsus	Patrick Préjean	Michael Elphick (Crysus)	Danny Mann (Optione, uncredited)
Prolix	Julien Guiomar	Ron Moody	Bill Martin
Vitalstatistix	Henri Poirier	Douglas Blackwell	Greg Burson (Chief Bombastix)
Cacofonix	Edgar Givry	Tim Brooke-Taylor	Greg Burson (Franksinatrix, uncredited)
Cacofonix	Jean-Jacques Cramier (singing)	Jean-Jacques Cramier (singing)	Jean-Jacques Cramier (singing)
Infirmofpurpus	Gérard Croce	Andrew Sachs (Ardeco)	Greg Burson (Sergeant Noodles, uncredited)
Impedimenta	Marie-Anne Chazel	Sheila Hancock	Lucille Bliss (Bonemine)
Centurion Voluptuous Arteriosclerosus	Roger Lumont	Brian Blessed (General Caous)	Ed Gilbert (Bossa Nova)
Mrs. Geriatrix	Jeanine Forney	Kathryn Hurlbutt	Mona Marshall
Geriatrix	Paul Bisciglia	Ian Thompson	Danny Mann (uncredited)
Fulliautomatix	Jean-Claude de Goros	Sean Barrett	Bill Martin (uncredited)
Bulbus Crocus	Jean-Claude Robbe	Geoffrey Matthews	Bill Martin (uncredited)
Unhygienix	Gérard Croce	Kerry Shale	Ed Gilbert (Fishstix, uncredited)
Narrator	N/A	N/A	Tony Jay

=== Additional Voices ===
- Original: Christine Aurel (Gauls), Jean-François Aupied (Legionnaire), Yves Barsacq (Gauls), Adrianne Bonnet (Gauls), Pierre Carrère (Gauls), Dominique Chauby (Gauls), Bruno Choël (Legionnaire), Alain Christie (Gauls), Murielle Deville (Gauls), Paule Emanuele (Mrs. Fulliautomatix), Pierre Forget, Gilbert Gullivand, Danièle Hazan (Bacteria), Gilbert Lévy (Gauls), Myriam Moszko, Christian Schmidt (Legionnaire), Severine Vincent, David Ferre, Dariusz Gogol, Nick Roberts, Martin Brisac (Gauls)
- U.K. Version (1990): Elizabeth Proud (Mrs. Fulliautomatix, Gauls), Geoffrey Matthews (Gauls), Ian Thompson (Legionnaires, Gauls), Kathryn Hurlbutt (Bacteria, Gauls), Kerry Shale (Legionnaires, Gauls), Sean Barrett (Legionnaires)

== Release ==
The first English dub of Asterix and the Big Fight featured Bill Oddie, Bernard Bresslaw, Peter Hawkins, Brian Blessed, Tim Brooke-Taylor, Andrew Sachs, and Ron Moody, amongst others, and was widely seen in the UK. For the UK DVD Box Set release, rather than using the British dub, an American produced dub was included, featuring the voices of Henry Winkler as Asterix, Rosey Grier as Obelix and Lucille Bliss as Bonemine. This dub had been intended for a U.S. release which ultimately never materialized and was shelved until French distributor Gaumont acquired the rights and included it on the DVD. The American dub is considered inferior by fans of the original due to it changing parts of the script as well as character names (Getafix is changed to "Vitamix", Vitalstatistix to "Chief Bombastix", Cacofonix to "Franksinatrix," Impedimenta to "Bonemine" (her actual French name), and Unhygienix to "Fishstix"), and general dumbing-down for an audience assumed to be unfamiliar with the characters. The American dub assigns stereotypical Italian comedy accents to the Roman characters, features a narrator (Tony Jay) explaining the plot to the audience, and makes changes to the terminology of the original story, substituting "wizard" for druid, "fortuneteller" for soothsayer, "rockets" for menhirs, and "vitamin potion" for the magic potion.

== See also ==
- List of Asterix films
