= Prejean =

Prejean or Préjean is a surname of French origin. The name is most common in southwest Louisiana, where it might have arrived from French Canada.

In France, the name is thought to have originated in the region of Burgundy, in the East of France. It is sometimes mistakenly derived from pré de Jean, "John’s meadow", but a more reasonable derivation is from the Old French Prod Jean, "Brave John", or possibly prod gent, of brave or virtuous family.

Notable people named Prejean include:

- Albert Préjean (1894-1979), French actor
- Carrie Prejean (born 1987), model and beauty queen
- Dalton Prejean (1959–1990), murderer
- Helen Prejean (born 1939), religious sister and advocate for the abolition of the death penalty
- Kawaipuna Prejean (1943–1992), Hawaiian nationalist
- Laura Préjean (born 1977), voice actress
- Jason Préjean (born 1983 - present)
