= Marcel Stern (composer) =

French composer and violinist

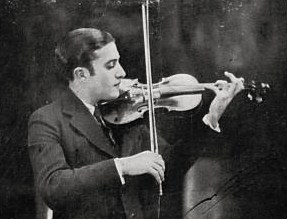
Marcel Stern

Marcel Stern (4 November 1909 – 2 August 1989) was a French composer and violinist.

== Life ==
Born in Paris, Stern studied at the Conservatoire de Paris and won the Premier Grand Prix de Rome in 1936 with the cantata Gisèle. After his stay at the Villa Medici in Rome, the Société Nationale performed his Divertissement for Orchestra in Paris in 1939.

The Second World War interrupted his musical career, though he completed his symphony La Libération during the Liberation in Cannes. The symphony was premiered on the radio in 1945 and by the Concerts Colonne in 1948 at the Théâtre du Châtelet under the direction of Paul Paray. Among his other works are Iberica from Deux pièces pour flûte seule (1964), and the Concerto: pour piano et orchestre (1968). He also composed several transcriptions of works by other composers for violin and orchestra, including George Enescu's First Romanian Rhapsody.

== Compositions ==
=== Classical works (selection) ===
- 1935: Cantata Le Château endormi (deuxième Second Grand Prix de Rome)
- 1936: Cantata Gisèle (Premier Grand Prix de Rome)
- 1939: Divertissement for small orchestra
- 1945: Symphony La Libération in E
- 1964: Bucolique and Iberica, two pieces for flute solo
- 1968: Concerto for piano and orchestra (YouTube)

=== Cinema ===
Marcel Stern also distinguished himself in the field of film music. Thus, from 1946 to 1963, he was responsible for the scores of fourteen French films (two, however, being French-Italian co-productions).

- 1946: The Faceless Enemy by Robert-Paul Dagan and Maurice Cammage
- 1947: Not guilty by Henri Decoin
- 1948: Night Express by Marcel Blistène
- 1949: Vient de paraître by Jacques Houssin
- 1950: Le Grand Cirque by Georges Péclet
- 1951: Avalanche by Raymond Segard
- 1952: Love Is Not a Sin by Claude Cariven
- 1955: Men in White by Ralph Habib
- 1956: In the Manner of Sherlock Holmes by Henri Lepage
- 1957: Fernand clochard by Pierre Chevalier
- 1958: Seventh Heaven by Raymond Bernard (Franco-Italian film)
- 1960: Thunder in the Blood by André Haguet and Jean-Paul Sassy
- 1962: Rencontres by Philippe Agostini (Franco-Italian film)
- 1963: La Soupe aux poulets by Philippe Agostini
