= Mummy Nanny =

German-French animated television series

- Created by: Denis Olivieri; Claude Prothée
- Starring: Mona Marshall; Joshua Seth
- Countries of origin: Germany; France
- No. of seasons: 1
- No. of episodes: 26

Production
- Running time: 26 minutes

Original release
- Network: Super RTL; France 2 Telefutura
- Release: April 17 – May 22, 2001

Mummy Nanny is an animated television series.

== Synopsis ==
Nile, an Egyptian mummy, is drawn from her sleep that has lasted for five thousand years. She becomes a part of a pair with Samantha and Alex. The father is a novel writer who wears different costumes and gets too serious in his writing. The mother is an scientist and inventor who gets over her head and her experiments backfire. The kids were expecting a super strict nanny, but due to bumbling burglars, dim-witted cops, Nile's uncle and the sorcerer who wants his shadow back (which Nile took from the beginning), they were able to disguise her as the new nanny and made it home safely. Now she can protect the shadow and the children from whatever danger comes their way.

== French Voice Actors ==
- Patricia Legrand : Nile
- Mark Lesser : Alex
- Kelly Marot : Capucine
- Benoît Allemane : Akeltonton

== English Voice Actors ==
- Mona Marshall : Nile
- Joshua Seth : Alex
- Steve Blum : Mr. Elsewhere
- Wendee Lee : Mrs. Elsewhere
- Rebecca Forstadt : Samantha
- Paul St. Peter : Uncle Ankh
- Michael Sorich : Mr. Big
- Bob Buchholz : Stretch
- Richard Epcar : Narrator

== Technical Information ==
- Original name: Momie au pair
- German name: Unsere Mumie ist die Beste
- English name: Mummy Nanny
- Production: Jacky Bretaudeau, Luc Vinciguerra
- Author: Denis Olivieri, Claude Prothée
- Writers: Claude Prothée
- Graphics: Fabrice Parme
- Music: Gérald Roberts, Didier Riey
- Origin: France Germany
- Production houses: Les Cartooneurs Associés, EM TV Merchandising AG, France 2

== Episode list ==
1. In the Beginning
2. The 5000 Year Vacation !
3. A Casket for Two
4. Party Animals
5. The Sacred Chameleon
6. Grandma's Hair-Loom
7. Spaced Out
8. Mummy Marooned
9. Premiere Perils
10. Virtual Catastrophe
11. Love at Sea
12. Surf, Sand & Sarcophagus
13. Hair Today, Gone Tomorrow
14. Super Model Super Mummy !
15. Freezer Burn
16. Mutants, Moles & Mummies !
17. Camping Catastrophe
18. Mummy for Ransom !
19. Mummy Misery at Amazingland !
20. The Substitute Mummy !
21. Fast Food Mummy !
22. Kung Fu Mummy
23. Sarcophagus Spies
24. Television Terror
25. Movie Star Mummy
26. Mummy Mind Games
27. Wasted Talent
