= Boite =

Boite may refer to:

- Boite (river), a river of northern Italy
- Valle del Boite, the valley of northern Italy in which the Boite river flows
- Pierrier à boîte, an early type of small wrought iron cannon developed in the early 15th century
- La Boite Theatre Company, a major Australian theatre company based in Brisbane, Queensland
- La Boîte noire, a 2005 French mystery film
- Boîte à vendre, a 1951 French comedy film
- Boite mac Cináeda (d. 1058), Scottish prince, son of King Kenneth III of Scotland
- Boîte à bonbons, a 16-CD box set compilation of the recorded songs of Jacques Brel
