= Young Cardinaud =

1942 novel

- Author: Georges Simenon
- Language: French
- Genre: Drama
- Publisher: Éditions Gallimard
- Publication date: 1942
- Publication place: France
- Media type: Print
- Pages: 191

Young Cardinaud (French: Le Fils Cardinaud) is a 1942 novel by the French-based Belgian writer Georges Simenon. It is set in La Rochelle.

== Plot ==
One Sunday, Hubert Cardinaud returns home from Mass with his little boy after buying, as he does every Sunday, dessert for Sunday dinner. To his great surprise, his wife Marthe is not there. After searching among his acquaintances, he is forced to admit that she has run off with the household savings, having carefully entrusted her baby to a neighbor. He immediately decides to find his wife and bring her home at all costs. He takes time off work to methodically continue a search that introduces him the world of evil, vulgarity, and selfishness, that his marriage had always kept away from him.

During this ordeal, he learns that his wife has run off with a man of bad character, Mimile. A local petty criminal who has had numerous run-ins with Mimile is also looking for him in order to kill him: it is he who provides Cardinaud with a new lead. The latter discovers Mimile first and does not hesitate to warn him of the danger he is in but this will not prevent him from being stabbed later. Marthe, abandoned by her seducer, finds a husband who has not stopped loving her. Fairly indifferent, she returns with him to home, married life, and Sunday dinners.

== Adaptation ==
In 1956 it was adapted into the film Blood to the Head directed by Gilles Grangier and starring Jean Gabin and Claude Sylvain.

== Bibliography ==
- Carter, David. The Pocket Essential Georges Simenon. Pocket Essentials, 2003.
- Goble, Alan. The Complete Index to Literary Sources in Film. Walter de Gruyter, 1999. - Via Google Books.
