= In the Manner of Sherlock Holmes =

1956 film

- Directed by: Henri Lepage
- Written by: Henri Lepage; Billy Martin
- Produced by: Lyliane Leneutre
- Starring: Henri Vilbert; Claude Sylvain; Michel Ardan
- Cinematography: Willy Faktorovitch
- Edited by: Jean Mascaux; Marcelle Saysset
- Music by: Marcel Stern
- Production company: Alma Productions
- Distributed by: Astoria Films
- Release date: 5 June 1956
- Running time: 103 minutes
- Country: France
- Language: French

In the Manner of Sherlock Holmes (French: À la manière de Sherlock Holmes) is a 1956 French crime film directed by Henri Lepage and starring Henri Vilbert, Claude Sylvain and Michel Ardan. The film's sets were designed by the art director Raymond Nègre.

== Synopsis ==
A Parisian businessman travelling in Rouen is implicated in a case of theft and murder.

== Cast ==
- Henri Vilbert as Henri Lombard
- Claude Sylvain as Viviane Deroches
- Michel Ardan as Louis Gamay
- Robert Dalban as Commissaire Sanois
- Jean-Pierre Kérien as Marval
- Jacques Dynam as Assistant
- Georgette Anys as La femme de ménage
- Charles Lemontier as Leblond
- Paul Lambret as Chan
- Charles Rigoulot as l'inspecteur Barbier

== Bibliography ==
- Palmer, Tim. Tales of the Underworld: Jean-Pierre Melville and the 1950s French Cinema. University of Wisconsin-Madison, 2003.
