= Return to Paradise (1935 film) =

1935 film

- Directed by: Serge de Poligny
- Written by: André-Paul Antoine; Serge de Poligny
- Starring: Claude Dauphin; Mary Morgan; Marcel André
- Cinematography: Georges Benoît
- Edited by: Jean Feyte
- Music by: Marcel Lattès
- Production company: O.H. Films
- Distributed by: ACE
- Release date: 15 November 1935
- Running time: 105 minutes
- Country: France
- Language: French

Return to Paradise (French: Retour au paradis) is a 1935 French comedy film directed by Serge de Poligny and starring Claude Dauphin, Mary Morgan and Marcel André. The film's sets were designed by the art director Pierre Schild.

== Synopsis ==
Robert Ginet, a millionaire is advised to take a period of rest in the country by his doctor. There he falls on love with Line, who once owned the estate and has stayed on as manager. Despite the attempts of his scheming secretary to foil the romance, they end up together.

== Cast ==
- Claude Dauphin as Robert Ginet
- Mary Morgan as Line Sazarin
- Marcel André as Le docteur Bouvard
- Jeanne Fusier-Gir as La baronne de Pindêche
- Viviane Romance as Suzanne
- Marcel Dalio as Le notaire
- Jean Tissier as Le poète
- Ginette Darcy as Simone
- Andrews Engelmann as Mareuil
- Simone Dehelly
- Raymond Cordy
- André Fouché
- J.C. Christian
- André Numès Fils
- Albert Malbert
- André Siméon
- Andrée Lorraine
- Rose Amy
- Michèle Michel
- Annie Carriel
- Valentine Camax

== Bibliography ==
- Philippe Rège. Encyclopedia of French Film Directors, Volume 1. Scarecrow Press, 2009.
