= Sins of Paris =

1953 film

- Directed by: Henri Lepage
- Written by: André-Paul Antoine
- Produced by: Robert de Nesle
- Starring: André Claveau; Lysiane Rey; Georges Lannes
- Cinematography: Charles Bauer
- Edited by: Jeannette Berton
- Music by: Guy Lafarge
- Production company: Comptoir Français de Productions Cinématographiques
- Distributed by: Comptoir Français du Film
- Release date: 17 April 1953
- Running time: 90 minutes
- Country: France
- Language: French

Sins of Paris (French: Rires de Paris) is a 1953 French musical comedy crime film directed by Henri Lepage and starring André Claveau, Lysiane Rey and Georges Lannes. The film's sets were designed by the art director Claude Bouxin.

== Synopsis ==
Du Bois, a millionaire who cannot laugh has been summoning the music hall acts of Paris to his house to perform for him. As they then disappear, leading performer Mousse decides to launch an investigation.

== Cast ==
- André Claveau as M. Du Bois
- Lysiane Rey as Mousse
- Georges Lannes as Barket
- Édith Georges
- Frédéric O'Brady
- Saint-Granier
- Philippe Olive
- Darío Moreno
- Gérard Darrieu
- Catherine Romane
- Martine de Breteuil
- Claudette Donald
- Sylvain
- René Lacourt
- Jean Rigaux
- Max Dalban

== Bibliography ==
- Bessy, Maurice & Chirat, Raymond. Histoire du cinéma français: 1951-1955. Pygmalion, 1989.
- Rège, Philippe. Encyclopedia of French Film Directors, Volume 1. Scarecrow Press, 2009.
