= Farewell Paris =

1952 film

- Directed by: Claude Heymann
- Written by: Guillaume Hanoteau; Claude Heymann
- Produced by: Georges Sénamaud
- Starring: Françoise Arnoul; Henri Vilbert; Camille Sauvage
- Cinematography: Pierre Petit
- Edited by: Raymond Lamy
- Music by: Camille Sauvage
- Production company: Les Films Lutétia
- Distributed by: Sofradis
- Release date: 25 September 1952
- Running time: 85 minutes
- Country: France
- Language: French

Farewell Paris (French: Adieu Paris) is a 1952 French musical film directed by Claude Heymann and starring Françoise Arnoul, Henri Vilbert and Camille Sauvage. The film's sets were designed by the art director Paul Laurenti.

== Main cast ==
- Françoise Arnoul as Françoise
- Henri Vilbert as M Lamy
- Camille Sauvage as Camille Lamy
- Victoria Marino as Sylvia
- René Clermont as Boireau
- Marcelle Arnold as Virginie
- Philippe Nicaud as Mario
- Renée Cosima as Juliette

== Bibliography ==
- Bessy, Maurice & Chirat, Raymond. Histoire du cinéma français: 1951–1955. Pygmalion, 1989.
- Rège, Philippe. Encyclopedia of French Film Directors, Volume 1. Scarecrow Press, 2009.
