= Asterix the Gaul (film) =

French-Belgian animated movie (1967)

- French theatrical release poster
- Astérix le Gaulois
- Directed by: Ray Goossens
- Screenplay by: Willy Lateste; Jos Marissen; László Molnár
- Based on: Asterix the Gaul by René Goscinny; Albert Uderzo
- Produced by: Georges Dargaud
- Starring: Roger Carel; Jacques Morel; Pierre Tornade; Lucien Raimbourg
- Narrated by: Bernard Lavalette
- Cinematography: Francois Léonard; Georges Lapeyronnie; Étienne Schürmann
- Edited by: Francois Ceppi; Jacques Marchel; Laszlo Molnar
- Music by: Gérard Calvi
- Production companies: Dargaud Films; Belvision
- Distributed by: Athos Films
- Release date: December 20, 1967
- Running time: 68 minutes
- Countries: France; Belgium
- Language: French

Asterix the Gaul (French: Astérix le Gaulois) is a 1967 French-Belgian animated film, the first in a franchise, based on the comic book of the same name, which was the first book in the highly popular comic series Asterix by René Goscinny and Albert Uderzo. The film closely follows the book's plot.

The film was originally planned to be aired on French television, but instead it was released as a theatrical feature film. It was produced by Dargaud, publisher of the Asterix comics, without the involvement of Albert Uderzo and René Goscinny. Goscinny and Uderzo were not satisfied with the film, but reluctantly agreed to its release. However, they managed to stop the production of two planned sequels, Asterix and the Golden Sickle and Asterix and the Big Fight (likewise made without their involvement). Afterwards, they ensured that they would be consulted for all subsequent cartoon adaptations, starting with Asterix and Cleopatra. The film was animated by Belvision.

== Plot ==
Asterix is ambushed by a large group of Roman legionaries in the forest. Asterix leaves the Romans beaten and bruised, prompting their leader Phonus Balonus to seek the secret behind the Gauls' superhuman strength. Phonus selects a volunteer (by musical chairs) to infiltrate the village posing as a Gaul. A short, slack-tongued misfit named Caligula Minus is dressed in a wig, false moustache and traditional Gaulish dress and led in chains through the forest as a prisoner. Asterix and Obelix free Minus who convinces them he's a Gaul from Lutetia.

Once inside the Gaulish village, Minus goads Asterix into sharing the secret of the magic potion with him and convinces Getafix to let him try the potion for himself. Minus' cover is accidentally blown during a traditional dance when Asterix inadvertently pulls off the false moustache. Still empowered by the magic potion, the Gauls are powerless to stop Minus' escape.

Minus is debriefed by Phonus Balonus, who orders his legionaries to capture Getafix. They ambush Getafix while he is collecting mistletoe, but he refuses to divulge the secrets of his magic potion. Asterix searches the forest for him and encounters a slow-witted merchant who agrees to take him to the Roman camp on his cart, hidden in a pile of hay until nightfall. Having infiltrated the camp, Asterix hears Phonus plotting with his Decurion Marcus Sourpuss to overthrow Caesar. Asterix locates Getafix and forms a plan to free him. He seemingly surrenders and convinces the Romans that he and Getafix will co-operate at the prospect of being tortured; Getafix is then escorted by legionnaires as he collects the required ingredients for the potion in the forest. Getafix orders the Romans to search for strawberries, knowing they're out of season. When an exhausted legionnaire returns with a basket of them from Greece, the Gauls to eat them all and request more be obtained. This drives Phonus to despair; Getafix quickly relents and prepares the potion without strawberries.

Believing the potion Getafix has made is that which gives the Gauls their strength, the Romans drink it and discover it's a hair-growing formula. The entire legion is soon at the mercy of Getafix with out of control hair and beards rendering them helpless. Getafix claims that he can reverse the potion's effects by making another, knowing that the effects will wear off soon anyway. With the Romans distracted he collects the ingredients for the real magic potion which he prepares for Asterix, and an "antidote", in reality vegetable soup. As the pair begin to overpower their captors, Phonus receives a surprise visit from Julius Caesar. Dismayed by the state he finds the camp, he asks to meet the Gauls. Asterix reveals that Phonus planned to use the potion to overthrow Caesar. Phonus is relieved of his duties Caesar grants Asterix and Getafix their freedom, telling them they will meet again.

Asterix and Getafix return to the village for a celebratory banquet.

== Cast ==
| Character | Original | English Dub |
|---|---|---|
| Asterix | Roger Carel | Lee Payant (uncredited) |
| Caligula Minus | Roger Carel | Lee Payant (uncredited) |
| Obelix | Jacques Morel | Hal Brav (uncredited) |
| Vitalstatistix | Pierre Tornade | Yves Brainville (Tonabrix, uncredited) |
| Ox Merchant | Pierre Tornade | Hal Brav (uncredited) |
| Crismus Bonus | Pierre Tornade | Steve Eckardt (Phonus Balonus, uncredited) |
| Getafix | Lucien Raimbourg | John Primm (Panoramix, uncredited) |
| Narrator | Bernard Lavalette | Bruce Johansen (uncredited) |
| Marcus Ginantonicus | Pierre Trabaud | Lee Payant (Marcus Sourpuss, uncredited) |
| Julius Caesar | Jacques Mauclair (uncredited) | Steve Eckardt (uncredited) |
| Cacofonix | Jacques Jouanneau (uncredited) | François Valorbe (Stopthemusix, uncredited) |
| Tulius Octopus | Henri Labussière (uncredited) | Billy Kearns (uncredited) |
| Claudius Quintilius | Maurice Chevit | Steve Eckardt (Augustus Picklepuss, uncredited) |
| The Executioner | Maurice Chevit | Steve Eckardt (uncredited) |
| Roman Soldier | Maurice Chevit | Steve Eckardt (uncredited) |
| Legionnaires | Roger Carel | Steve Eckardt (uncredited) |
| Legionnaires | Pierre Tornade | Yves Brainville (uncredited) |
| Legionnaires | Pierre Trabaud | Billy Kearns (uncredited) |

=== Additional Voices ===
- Original: Robert Vattier, Michel Puterflam, Georges Carmier

=== Uncredited ===
- Original: Yves Brainville (Additional Voices)

No credits exist for this film in English. As most of the recurring characters sound identical in Asterix and Cleopatra, it can be reasonably assumed that the same cast was used in both films, though, at present, only a few roles can be credited.

== Production and release ==
- In the English version of the film, many of the characters' names are inconsistent with those used in the rest of the series and books. Getafix kept his original French name Panoramix, Vitalstatistix is named Tonabrix and the bard Cacofonix is named Stopthemusix. The name changes were attributed to the film being dubbed in English before the books were translated, although the names of the characters are correct in the intro titles. This has however been changed for re-releases, where the titles reflect the names as spoken in the film.
- In the scene where Caligula Minus is drinking the magic potion, Getafix seems to be tall, and someone is wearing the same clothes as Asterix.
- In the film, Caesar has black hair instead of white like rest of movies.
- This is only Asterix film that does not include Dogmatix or any female character.

== Reception ==
In the United Kingdom, the film was watched by 500,000 viewers on television in 2004, making it the year's third most-watched European-language film on television.

== See also ==
- List of Asterix films
