= Their Last Night =

1953 film

- Directed by: Georges Lacombe
- Written by: Jacques Celhay; Jacques Constant; Georges Lacombe
- Produced by: Édouard Harispuru
- Starring: Jean Gabin; Madeleine Robinson; Robert Dalban
- Cinematography: Philippe Agostini
- Edited by: Raymond Leboursier
- Music by: Francis Lopez
- Production company: Compagnie Commerciale Française Cinématographique
- Distributed by: Columbia Films
- Release date: 23 October 1953
- Running time: 95 minutes
- Country: France
- Language: French

Their Last Night (French: Leur dernière nuit) is a 1953 French crime drama film directed by Georges Lacombe and starring Jean Gabin, Madeleine Robinson and Robert Dalban. It was shot at the Billancourt Studios in Paris and on location around the city. The film's sets were designed by the art director Léon Barsacq.

== Plot ==
Madeleine, a young teacher from the provinces, arrives in Paris and encounters Pierre Ruffin a seemingly respectable librarian who lives at the same lodging as her in Montmartre. However he comes in one night wounded by a bullet and admits to her that he leads a double life as a gangster. After killing one of his accomplices who has betrayed him, the police net closes in on him. He returns to spend one final night of love with Madeleine before fleeing to Belgium, but he is tracked down by the law.

== Cast ==
- Jean Gabin as Pierre Fernand Ruffin dit Monsieur Fernand
- Madeleine Robinson as Madeleine Marsan
- Michel Barbey as Dédé - un gangster
- Gaby Basset as La prostituée
- Paul Bonifas as Le commissaire principal
- Robert Dalban as L'inspecteur Dupré
- Suzanne Dantès as Mademoiselle Mercier
- Jean-Jacques Delbo as Antoine Pérez
- Arthur Devère as Le marinier
- Luce Fabiole as La directrice du cours Sévigné
- Fernand Gilbert as Le bistro
- Camille Guérini as Monsieur Malafosse
- Jacqueline Marbaux as Madame de Lydia
- Geneviève Morel as La bonne de l'hôtel
- Odette Barencey as La cuisinière de la pension
- Georges Baconnet as Le notaire
- Paul Barge as Le patron de l'hôtel
- Yvonne Constant as Marceline
- Cécile Didier as Madame Legrain
- Jean Lanier as L'inspecteur Pierson
- Raymond Loyer as Paulo
- Yves Massard as Le codétenu du car de police
- Jean Ozenne as Le chanoine Bourianne
- Maryse Paillet as La femme du marinier
- Raymond Rognoni as Un pensionnaire du Duc d'Aumale
- Henri San Juan as P'tit Louis - un gangster
- Jackie Sardou as La concierge
- Françoise Soulié as Nicole
- Sylvain as Le garçon d'hôtel
- Georges Vitray as Monsieur Villard - un magistrat retraité

== Bibliography ==
- Harriss, Joseph (2018-10-18). Jean Gabin: The Actor Who Was France. McFarland. ISBN 978-1-4766-7627-2.
