= The Secret of Florida =

1947 film

- Directed by: Jacques Houssin
- Written by: André-Paul Antoine; Pierre Farny
- Starring: Albert Préjean; Henri Guisol; Lysiane Rey
- Cinematography: André Dantan
- Music by: Henri Martinet
- Production company: Films Record
- Distributed by: Les Films Minerva
- Release date: 6 March 1947
- Running time: 80 minutes
- Country: France
- Language: French

The Secret of Florida (French: Le secret du Florida) is a 1947 French crime film directed by Jacques Houssin and starring Albert Préjean, Henri Guisol and Lysiane Rey.

== Synopsis ==
Four friends take possession of a yacht the Florida for their holiday. However it turns out that the boat has a shady past having been used recently for drug smuggling drawing the attention of the police.

== Cast ==
- Albert Préjean as Paul
- Henri Guisol as Le chef
- Lysiane Rey as Madeleine
- Anita Giss as Gisèle
- Jim Gérald as Dupont
- Nicolas Amato as Le contrebandier
- Pierre Farny as Roger
- Jean-François Martial as L'inspecteur
- Raphaël Patorni as Léo
- Rogers as Gustave

== Bibliography ==
- Rège, Philippe. Encyclopedia of French Film Directors, Volume 1. Scarecrow Press, 2009.
