= In the Sun of Marseille =

- Directed by: Pierre-Jean Ducis
- Written by: Audiffred (operetta); Marc Cab (operetta); Charles Tutelier (operetta)
- Produced by: Henri Ullmann
- Starring: Henri Garat; Mireille Ponsard; Gorlett
- Cinematography: Fred Langenfeld
- Music by: Georges Sellers
- Production company: Productions Henri Ullmann
- Distributed by: Consortium du Film
- Release date: 4 May 1938
- Running time: 85 minutes
- Country: France
- Language: French

In the Sun of Marseille (French: Au soleil de Marseille) is a 1938 French musical sports film directed by Pierre-Jean Ducis and starring Henri Garat, Mireille Ponsard and Gorlett. It was one of a cluster of films made with southern French settings during the era.

An operetta film, it portrays the lives of a group of football-loving factory workers who travel to Belgium for a match.

The film's sets were designed by Lucien Jaquelux.

== Cast ==
- Henri Garat as Henri
- Mireille Ponsard as Mimi Cassis
- Gorlett as Fenouil
- Zizi Festerat as Van Meulenbeek
- Rittche as Sidol
- Henry as Jef le douanier
- Mado France as Maricke
- Henri Vilbert as Marius
- Charles Lemontier as Le contrôleur
- Caro Devère as Simone Van Meulenbeek
- Germaine Sablon as Ginette
- Fernand Charpin as M. Cassis

== Bibliography ==
- Crisp, Colin. Genre, Myth and Convention in the French Cinema, 1929-1939. Indiana University Press, 2002.
