= The New Masters =

1950 film

- Directed by: Paul Nivoix
- Written by: Jacques Daniel-Norman; Paul Nivoix
- Based on: The New Masters by Paul Nivoix
- Produced by: Camille Trachimel
- Starring: Albert Préjean; Hélène Perdrière; Raymond Bussières
- Cinematography: Marcel Villet
- Edited by: Jeannette Berton
- Production company: Compagnie des Artisans du Film
- Distributed by: Sirius Films
- Release date: 10 May 1950
- Running time: 92 minutes
- Country: France
- Language: French

The New Masters (French: Les nouveaux maîtres) is a 1950 French comedy film directed by Paul Nivoix and starring Albert Préjean, Hélène Perdrière and Raymond Bussières. The film's sets were designed by the art director Hugues Laurent. It was adapted by the director from his own stage play.

== Synopsis ==
When the industrialist Durand is targeted and ruined by a speculator who covets his wife Yvonne .Their château is left in the hands of the servants Victor and Marie who are the new masters and secretly conspire with the speculator. Matters are resolved when the old master of the place, the Marquis d'Aubenton gains control of the place once more thanks to a marriage to a wealthy American heiress. He not employs Durand and his wife as the new managers of the estate.

== Cast ==
- Albert Préjean as Étienne Durand
- Hélène Perdrière as Yvonne Durand
- Raymond Bussières as Victor Tricoudard
- Annette Poivre as Marie
- Guy Rapp as Padrovitch
- Martine de Breteuil as La marquise d'Aubenton
- Jean-Max as Le marquis d'Aubenton
- Georges Bever
- Simone Delamare
- Paul Faivre
- Jean Gobet
- René Hell
- Robert Le Fort
- Julien Maffre
- André Numès Fils
- Henri Rollan

== Bibliography ==
- Ford, Charles. Histoire du cinéma français contemporain, 1945–1977. Éditions France-Empire, 1977.
- Rège, Philippe. Encyclopedia of French Film Directors, Volume 1. Scarecrow Press, 2009.
