= Photograbber =

- Directed by: Pascal Tosi
- Written by: Pascal Tosi
- Produced by: Aton Soumache
- Cinematography: Juan Diego Solanas
- Release date: 2004
- Running time: 18 minutes
- Country: France

Photograbber (original title Photomateurs) is an 18-minute French live action short film (with English subtitles) written and directed by Pascal Tosi.

== Synopsis ==
Set in 1952, this is a tale about a unique camera that captures reality. When the photos rebel against the photographer (a charming, henpecked toymaker) a battle begins.

== Cast and characters ==
- Michel Crémadès (Marcel)
- Christine Melcer (Carole)
- Catherine Cyler (Marie)

== Technical team ==
- Director: Pascal Tosi
- Produced by: Aton Soumache
- Director of photography: Juan Diego Solanas
- Editing: Sylviane Gozin
- Set decorator: Frank Muller
- Executive in Charge of Production: Jean-Frédéric Samie
- Digital visual effects director: Hugues Namur
- Special Effects: Sparx*

== Awards ==
- ReelHeART International Film Festival (June 2006): 1st place short film

== Official selections ==
- Golden Horse Film Festival - Digital Shorts Competition Taiwan (November 2005)
- Puchon International Fantastic Film Festival South Korea (July 2005)
- Fantasporto Portugal (March 2005)
- Santa Barbara International Film Festival USA (January 2005)
- Foyle Film Festival - Seagate Northern Ireland (November 2004)
