= Blood to the Head =

1956 film

- Directed by: Gilles Grangier
- Written by: Gilles Grangier; Michel Audiard
- Based on: Young Cardinaud by Georges Simenon
- Produced by: Fernand Rivers
- Starring: Jean Gabin; Paul Frankeur; Claude Sylvain
- Cinematography: André Thomas
- Edited by: Paul Cayatte
- Music by: Henri Verdun
- Production company: Les Films Fernand Rivers
- Distributed by: Les Films Fernand Rivers
- Release date: 10 August 1956
- Running time: 83 minutes
- Country: France
- Language: French

Blood to the Head (French: Le sang à la tête) is a 1956 French drama film directed by Gilles Grangier and starring Jean Gabin, Paul Frankeur and Claude Sylvain. It is based on the 1942 novel Young Cardinaud by Georges Simenon. It was shot at the Epinay Studios and on location in La Rochelle. The film's sets were designed by the art director Robert Bouladoux.

== Cast ==
- Jean Gabin as François Cardinaud
- Paul Frankeur as Drouin
- Claude Sylvain as Raymonde Babin
- Georgette Anys as Titine Babin
- José Quaglio as Mimile Babin
- Paul Faivre as Monsieur Cardinaud - père
- Léonce Corne as Charles Mandine
- Florelle as Sidonie Vauquier
- Paul Azaïs as Alphonse, le patron des 'Charentes'
- Rivers Cadet as Le patron du Robinson
- Paul Oettly as Vauquier
- Yolande Laffon as Isabelle Mandine
- Julienne Paroli as Madame Cardinaud - mère
- Gabriel Gobin as Arthur Cardinaud
- Marcel Pérès as Thévenot, un marinier
- Rudy Palmer as Vittorio
- Hugues Wanner as L'expert
- Joël Schmitt as Le patron du 'Grand Café'
- Jean-Louis Bras as Jean Cardinaud
- Monique Mélinand as Marthe Cardinaud
- Henri Crémieux as Hubert Mandine
- Renée Faure as Mademoiselle

== Bibliography ==
- Oscherwitz, Dayna & Higgins, MaryEllen. The A to Z of French Cinema. Scarecrow Press, 2009.
