= Renaissance (2006 film) =

2006 film by Christian Volckman

- French theatrical release poster
- Directed by: Christian Volckman
- Screenplay by: Mathieu Delaporte; Alexandre de la Patellière; Patrick Raynal; Jean-Bernard Pouy
- Story by: Alexandre de la Patellière; Mathieu Delaporte
- Produced by: Roch Lener; Aton Soumache; Alexis Vonarb
- Edited by: Pascal Tosi
- Music by: Nicholas Dodd
- Production companies: Pathé; Onyx Films; Millimages; LuxAnimation; Timefirm Limited; France 2 Cinéma; Odyssey Entertainment
- Distributed by: Pathé Distribution
- Release date: 15 March 2006
- Running time: 105 minutes
- Countries: France; United Kingdom; Luxembourg
- Language: French
- Budget: $18 million (€14 million)
- Box office: $1.8 million

Renaissance (also known as Paris 2054: Renaissance) is a 2006 animated tech noir film. The film, which was co-produced in France, the United Kingdom and Luxembourg, was directed by Christian Volckman. It was released on 15 March 2006 in France and 28 July 2006 in the UK by Pathé Distribution and on 22 September 2006 in the US by Miramax Films. In the English-language version, some of the main characters are voiced by Daniel Craig, Jonathan Pryce and Ian Holm. Renaissance uses a style of motion capture animation in which almost all images are exclusively black-and-white; only occasional colour is used for detail. The film concerns a French policeman investigating the kidnapping of a scientist who may hold the key to eternal life in a futuristic and slightly dystopian Paris.

The film received mixed reviews from critics and was a box-office bomb, grossing only $1.8 million against a budget of $18 million.

== Plot ==
In 2054 Paris, 22-year-old scientist Ilona Tasuiev, who works for the megacorporation Avalon, is kidnapped. Meanwhile, police captain Barthélémy Karas defuses a hostage situation by killing the hostage-takers. Afterwards Karas is given the job of solving the mystery surrounding Ilona's disappearance. Karas begins by contacting Dr. Jonas Muller, a former Avalon scientist familiar with her.

Muller had been working to cure progeria, a genetic condition which affected his brother. Muller worked for Avalon as their top scientist but left after he failed to find a cure and his brother died. He took up new work at a free clinic. Muller tells Karas that "No one ever leaves Avalon", throwing the corporation under suspicion. Karas visits Paul Dellenbach, one of Avalon's CEOs and questions him about Ilona. On suggesting he may have been sleeping with her, Dellenbach replies "I sleep with my wife, I sleep with my secretary, I even sleep with my sister-in-law but I would never sleep with one of my researchers".

After following a series of dead ends, control tells Karas they are tailing Illona's car through Paris. Eventually he captures the driver after a chase which ends at the Eiffel Tower. The man turns out to be a henchmen of Farfella, an Arab Muslim mobster and a childhood friend of Karas. The police captain returns the criminal to Farfella who in return gives him security footage of Illona's kidnapping; it shows her car being stolen by an incredibly old man.

Karas asks Ilona's sister, Bislane, who works for Avalon to break into the company's Archives to discover what Muller was researching. Bislane discovers that a Dr. Nakata worked with Muller in a quest to find a cure for progeria. But they destroyed all evidence of their work when some of the children they were testing on started to mutate. Karas and Bislane then escape because accessing the closed file has alerted Avalon security.

Later Karas opens up to Bislane and tells her that he and Farfella were raised in the casbah where they worked with gangs. After a drug run went wrong, they ended up in a holding cell. Farfella escaped but Karas was left to the mercy of the other gang. Karas puts Bislane under false arrest to protect her from Avalon. Meanwhile, Ilona is shown confined in a cyber ball which is being controlled by the old man.

Eventually Karas tracks down Muller. He explains that he took Ilona because through her research she has discovered the secret to eternal life (as he himself did 40 years ago); but knowing what the consequences would be if Avalon acquired such knowledge, he kidnapped her. Karas tries to encourage the old scientist to hand himself in but Muller is mistakenly shot by a police marksman. Karas then deduces that the mysterious old man is Muller's younger brother: now immortal but trapped in an elderly body.

Karas calls on Farfella who hides Bislane from Avalon while also getting a fake passport for Ilona. However the mega-corporation's security are also closing in on the Parisian sewer where Ilona is being held captive. After a short battle, Karas is mortally wounded rescuing Ilona. However she refuses to take the fake passport to start a new life. Instead she tells Karas she wants immortality by giving her discovery to Avalon. Reluctantly Karas shoots her in the back as she walks back towards Avalon security. CEO Dellenbach watches all this happen through a live feed from one of his men's helmet camera.

As Karas lies dying, he imagines himself apologising to Bislane for killing her sister, for which she forgives him. Muller's little brother, living as a tramp, throws his picture of him and Muller into a burning bin. An advert for Avalon with an old woman becoming young again later says, "With Avalon, I know I'm beautiful and I'm going to stay that way."

== Cast ==
=== French ===
- Patrick Floersheim as Barthélémy Karas
- Laura Blanc as Bislane Tasuiev
- Virginie Mery as Ilona Tasuiev
- Gabriel Le Doze as Paul Dellenbach
- Marc Cassot as Jonas Muller
- Jerome Causse as Dmitri
- Bruno Choël as Pierre Amiel
- Marc Alfos as Nustrat Farfella
- Chris Bearne as Multiple
- Radica Jovicic as Woman Hostage

=== English dub ===
- Daniel Craig as Barthélémy Karas
- Catherine McCormack as Bislane Tasuiev
- Romola Garai as Ilona Tasuiev
- Jonathan Pryce as Paul Dellenbach
- Ian Holm as Jonas Muller
- Rick Warden as Amiel
- Breffni McKenna as Dmitri
- Kevork Malikyan as Nusrat Farfella
- Pax Baldwin as Farfella Boy
- Lachele Carl as Nora
- Wayne Forrester as Administrator
- Julian Nest as Parisien
- Sean Pertwee as Montoya
- Jessica Reavis as Multiple
- Nina Sosanya as Reparez
- Leslie Woodhall as Elderly Man

== Production ==
The production process created a unique look for the film.

The film's visual concept was based on film noir aesthetics, as well as works like Sin City. The producers used motion capture and computer graphics to create the film's look. The cast performed their scenes in motion-capture suits in front of a blue screen. Computer animators translated these animations to digital models used for the characters. The animated characters were placed in three-dimensional computer backdrops, with post-process effects added to achieve the film's final look. French automaker Citroën designed a car specially for the film, imagining what a Citroën might look like in 2054. Volckman initially wanted Karas to drive a Citroën DS and approached the company for permission to use it in the film. Citroën suggested the filmmakers work with their designers to design a new car. The final design was produced after three months. The film cost €14 million to make over six years. It was funded by Disney with US$3 million provided from Miramax.

== Reception ==
=== Box office ===
The film grossed a total of $1,831,348 worldwide – $70,644 in North America and $1,760,704 in other territories – including $1,520,587 in Algeria, France, Monaco, Morocco and Tunisia.

=== Critical reception ===
The film received mixed reviews from critics. The review aggregator Rotten Tomatoes reported that 49% of critics gave the film positive reviews, based on 77 reviews with an average of 5.6/10. The site's consensus reads, "Renaissance attempts to blend sci-fi wonder with stark noir animation, but is often more fun to look at than to watch." Metacritic reported the film had an average score of 57 out of 100, based on 17 reviews.

Renaissance won the Cristal for Best Feature at the 30th Annecy International Animation Film Festival.

The film was honoured at the 5th Festival of European Animated Feature Films and TV Specials where it was awarded the prize for Best Feature Film.

== See also ==
- List of animated feature-length films
- List of post-1960s films in black-and-white
