= Sins of Madeleine =

1951 film

- Directed by: Henri Lepage
- Written by: André-Paul Antoine; Henri Lepage; Georges Menuau (play)
- Produced by: Jean Guilley
- Starring: Madeleine Lebeau; Henri Vilbert; Yves Furet
- Cinematography: Charles Bauer
- Edited by: Jeannette Berton
- Music by: Joseph Kosma
- Production company: Comptoir Français de Productions Cinématographiques
- Distributed by: Comptoir Français du Film Production
- Release date: 9 August 1951
- Running time: 112 minutes
- Country: France
- Language: French

Sins of Madeleine (French: Dupont Barbès) is a 1951 French drama film directed by Henri Lepage and starring Madeleine Lebeau, Henri Vilbert and Yves Furet. It was shot at the Epinay Studios in Paris. The film's sets were designed by the art director Claude Bouxin. Madeline Lebeau's gowns were designed by Pierre Balmain.

== Cast ==
- Madeleine Lebeau as Malou
- Henri Vilbert as Monsieur Archibald
- Yves Furet as Bobby
- Pierre-Louis as Henri
- Jean Sylvain as Emile le serveur
- Jane Marken as Mme Antonine
- Lysiane Rey as La petite garce
- Corinne Aix
- Robert Balpo
- Yvonne Dany
- Gérard Darrieu
- Robert Dock
- Michel Garland
- Claude Larue
- Christian Lude
- Mag-Avril
- Michel Nastorg
- Robert Noël
- Jacqueline Noëlle
- Philippe Olive
- Maryse Paillet

== Bibliography ==
- Maurice Bessy, André Bernard & Raymond Chirat. Histoire du cinéma français: 1951-1955. Pygmalion, 1989.
