= After the Storm (1943 film) =

1943 film directed by Pierre-Jean Ducis

- Directed by: Pierre-Jean Ducis
- Written by: René-Robert Petit; Marc-Gilbert Sauvajon
- Produced by: Pierre Danis
- Starring: René Dary; Jules Berry; Suzy Prim
- Cinematography: Fred Langenfeld
- Edited by: Andrée Danis
- Music by: Raoul Moretti
- Production company: Jason Films
- Distributed by: Cyrnos Films
- Release date: 3 February 1943
- Running time: 90 minutes
- Country: France
- Language: French

After the Storm (French: Après l'orage) is a 1943 French comedy drama film directed by Pierre-Jean Ducis and starring René Dary, Jules Berry and Suzy Prim. Produced during the German Occupation of France, it was made in the Unoccupied Zone. It was filmed in 1941 but not release until two years later. It was shot at the Victorine Studios in Nice. The film's sets were designed by the art director Jean Douarinou.

== Synopsis ==
After a young engineer's plans to modernise his village in Southern France are rejected by the leaders, he decides to start a new life for himself in the city. In Paris, he meets and falls in love with a film actress but soon begins to understand the artificiality and dishonesty of city life. He is mobilised to serve in the Second World War. After the 1940 Armistice he gladly returns to his village and former girlfriend Odile who has waited for him.

== Main cast ==
- René Dary as René Sabin
- Jules Berry as Alex Krakow
- Suzy Prim as Catherine Grand
- Lysiane Rey as Odile
- Jean Daurand as Paul Cerdan
- René Alié as Olivier
- Gaston Orbal as Kri
- Fernand Charpin as Sabin

== Bibliography ==
- Rège, Philippe. Encyclopedia of French Film Directors, Volume 1. Scarecrow Press, 2009.
