= The Three Cousins (film) =

1947 film

- Directed by: Jacques Daniel-Norman
- Written by: André-Paul Antoine; Jacques Daniel-Norman
- Produced by: Jules Calamy
- Starring: Rellys; Andrex; Lysiane Rey
- Cinematography: Victor Arménise
- Edited by: Monique Bonnot
- Music by: Francis Lopez
- Production company: Productions Calamy
- Distributed by: Cocinor
- Release date: 10 December 1947
- Running time: 105 minutes
- Country: France
- Language: French

The Three Cousins (French: Les trois cousines) is a 1947 French comedy film directed by Jacques Daniel-Norman and starring Rellys, Andrex and Lysiane Rey. The film's sets were designed by the art director Robert Giordani.

== Synopsis ==
A penniless engineer receives a large inheritance from his uncle in Brazil, on the condition that he marries one of his three cousins.

== Cast ==
- Rellys Césarin Malfait
- Andrex as Claude
- Lysiane Rey as Isabelle
- Marie Bizet as Sophie
- Jacqueline Roman as Joséphine
- Roland Armontel as Monsieur de Sainte-Lucie
- Marcelle Praince as Mme de Sainte-Lucie
- Joe Alex as Le Noir
- Marthe Sarbel as La princesse
- Gustave Gallet as Mitaine
- Hennery as L'infirmier
- Claude Rivory as Max
- Geno Ferny as Le notaire
- Julien Maffre as Le douanier
- Maria Cordoba as Conchita
- Pops as Un danseur acrobatique

== Bibliography ==
- Rège, Philippe . Encyclopedia of French Film Directors, Volume 1. Scarecrow Press, 2009.
