= Henri Vilbert =

French actor

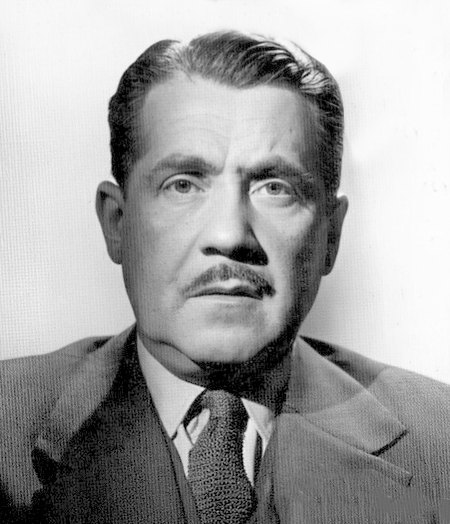
- Vilbert in 1953
- Born: 6 April 1904; Marseille, France
- Died: 20 April 1997 (aged 93); Cagnes-sur-Mer, France
- Occupation: Actor
- Years active: 1921–1982

Henri Vilbert (French pronunciation: [ɑ̃ʁi vilbɛʁ]; 6 April 1904 – 20 April 1997) was a French actor. He appeared in more than a hundred films from 1921 to 1982.

== Filmography ==
Film
Year	Title	Role	Notes
1921	Tartarin sur les Alpes	Tartarin	
1931	The Man in Evening Clothes		
1932	A Telephone Call	Cargouille	
1932	Student's Hotel	Étienne	
1932	Make-Up		
1932	Happy Hearts		
1933	Topaze	Un agent de police	
1933	Goodbye, Beautiful Days	Le professeur Ronnay	
1933	Maison hantée		
1933	Feu Toupinel	Valaury	
1934	Madame Bovary	Dr. Canivet	
1934	Sidonie Panache		
1934	Famille nombreuse	L'adjudant Broche	
1934	Tartarin de Tarascon		
1934	La Prison De Saint-Clothaire	Le brigadier de gendarmerie	
1935	Gangster malgré lui		
1935	A Rare Bird	Grégoire	
1935	Beautiful Days	Le paysan	
1935	Fanfare of Love		
1936	Mayerling	Un promeneur	Uncredited
1936	Les amants terribles	Un gendarme	
1936	La course à la vertu		
1938	If You Return	L'abbé	
1938	In the Sun of Marseille	Marius	
1938	Monsieur Coccinelle	Le patron du café	Uncredited
1938	Mother Love	Le barman du paquebot	
1939	Midnight Tradition	Un agent de police	Uncredited
1939	L'entraîneuse	Le directeur	
1942	Le Lit à colonnes	Un gardien	Uncredited
1942	The Murderer Lives at Number 21	Un agent	Uncredited
1942	No Love Allowed	Le vendeur de la roulotte	
1942	Love Marriage	Amédée	
1943	Picpus	Amadieu	
1943	La Main du diable	Le brigadier	Uncredited
1943	Mermoz	Le mécanicien de Fort-Lamy	
1944	Cecile Is Dead	Un inspecteur	Uncredited
1945	Majestic Hotel Cellars	Le chef cuisinier	Uncredited
1946	The Adventure of Cabassou	Gaudin	
1946	L'insaisissable Frédéric	Le policier	
1947	Six Hours to Lose	Le douanier	
1949	Manon	Le commandant du navire / Ship's Captain	
1950	We Will All Go to Paris	Le brigadier	Uncredited
1950	A Certain Mister	Antoine	
1950	Blonde	L'inspecteur Lambert	
1950	The Prize	Le brigadier / Brigadier of the Gendarmerie	
1950	Meurtres	Le docteur Marcel Picard	Uncredited
1951	Les maîtres-nageurs	Bernard Marchand	
1951	Sins of Madeleine	M. Archibald	
1951	Savage Triangle	Capitaine François	
1951	Village Feud	Victor	
1952	Rome 11:00		
1952	The Man in My Life	Léon Fontaine	Directed by Guy Lefranc
1952	We Are All Murderers	Mr. Arnaud	
1952	Fortuné de Marseille	Fortuné Toucasse	
1952	La demoiselle et son revenant	Ledru	
1952	Farewell Paris	M Lamy	
1952	Manon of the Spring	Le curé	
1952	The Last Robin Hood	L'inspecteur des douanes	
1953	The Baker of Valorgue	M. le Maire	
1953	Le club des 400 coups	Le curé	
1953	Good Lord Without Confession	François Dupont	
1953	Napoleon Road	Blaise	
1954	Love in a Hot Climate	Noguera	
1954	Letters from My Windmill	Dom Balaguère	(segment "Trois messes basses, Les")
1954	Ali Baba and the Forty Thieves	Cassim	
1955	La vena d'oro	Dottore Albani	
1955	Proibito	Niccodemo Barras	
1955	La ladra	L'Avvocato	
1956	In the Manner of Sherlock Holmes	Henri Lombard	
1956	Suspicion	Charles Tramillet	
1957	La ironía del dinero	Marido	(segment "Francia")
1957	Judicial Police	Le commissaire Frédéric	
1957	Lovers of Paris	Narcisse Bachelard	
1957	Le chômeur de Clochemerle	Piéchut	
1958	Secrets of a French Nurse	Riton	
1958	Città di notte	Signor Prandi	
1958	Tabarin	Morelli	
1958	Si le roi savait ça	Maître Nans	
1959	Guinguette	M. Jean	
1960	Le panier à crabes	Dorel	
1960	Le pain des Jules	Toussaint	
1961	Le pavé de Paris		
1961	Un Martien à Paris	Monsieur Walter	
1961	The Count of Monte Cristo	Danyès - le père d'Edmond	
1962	La traversée de la Loire	L'industriel	
1962	Dossier 1413	Le commissaire Rossi	
1962	The Devil and the Ten Commandments	Alexandre	(segment "Homicide point ne seras")
1963	Two Are Guilty	Un juré	
1963	D'où viens-tu Johnny?	Christophe Thibault	
1963	Le bon roi Dagobert	Saint-Eloi	(voix française) (voice, uncredited)
1963	La Cuisine au Beurre	Maître Sarrazin	
1971	The Savior	Councillor Flouret	
1972	Tout le monde il est beau, tout le monde il est gentil	Aimé Gloran-Gabel, le président des démocrates	
1972	La Scoumoune	Le gardien Graville	
1973	The Dominici Affair	Le président de la correctionnelle	
1978	Attention, The Kids Are Watching	Le gardien	

TV
Year	Title	Role	Notes
1956-1957	La Famille Anodin	Victor	5 episodes
1973	Les Cinq Dernières Minutes	Georges Mauvagnat / Victor Ragliano	2 episodes
