= Strange Suzy =

1941 film

- Directed by: Pierre-Jean Ducis
- Written by: Yves Mirande
- Starring: Suzy Prim; Claude Dauphin; Marguerite Moreno
- Cinematography: Fred Langenfeld; Jacques Lemare
- Edited by: Andrée Danis
- Music by: Vincent Scotto
- Production company: Badalo Films
- Release date: 29 August 1941
- Running time: 83 minutes
- Country: France
- Language: French

Strange Suzy (French: L'étrange Suzy) is a 1941 French comedy film directed by Pierre-Jean Ducis and starring Suzy Prim, Claude Dauphin and Marguerite Moreno.

Made in the southern zone of Vichy France, the film was a commercial success. Along with another hit The Well Digger's Daughter, it was banned by the Nazi authorities in the Occupied Zone in retaliation for a Vichy ban on the German film Bel Ami.

== Cast ==
- Suzy Prim as Suzy
- Claude Dauphin as Jacques Hébert
- Marguerite Moreno as La tante
- Albert Préjean as Henri Berger
- Pierre Stéphen as Joseph
- Gaby André as Aline
- Fernand Charpin
- Marcel Delaître
- Lisette Didier
- Lysiane Rey
- Marthe Sarbel
- Jacques Tarride

== Bibliography ==
- Noël Burch & Geneviève Sellier. The Battle of the Sexes in French Cinema, 1930–1956. Duke University Press, 2013.
- Winkel, Roel Vande & Welch, David. Cinema and the Swastika: The International Expansion of Third Reich Cinema. Palgrave MacMillan, 2011.
