= In the Service of the Tsar =

1936 film

- Directed by: Pierre Billon
- Written by: Jacques Companéez; Bernard Zimmer
- Produced by: Adolphe Osso; Michel Safra
- Starring: Pierre Richard-Willm; Véra Korène; Suzy Prim
- Cinematography: Nikolai Toporkoff
- Edited by: Georges Friedland
- Music by: Michel Michelet
- Production company: Diana Film
- Distributed by: Les Films H. Roussillon
- Release date: 13 November 1936
- Running time: 87 minutes
- Country: France
- Language: French

In the Service of the Tsar (French: Au service du tsar) is a 1936 French historical drama film directed by Pierre Billon and starring Pierre Richard-Willm, Véra Korène and Suzy Prim. It was shot at the Joinville Studios of Pathé in Paris. The film's sets were designed by the art directors Ludwig Kainer and Aimé Bazin.

== Synopsis ==
In the Russian Empire at the turn of the 20th century, an attractive female revolutionary enlist the unwitting help of an army officer to cross the border. She plans to assassinate a grand duke, but romantic complications fall in the way.

== Cast ==
- Pierre Richard-Willm as Le comte Michel Androvitch Tomsky
- Véra Korène as Anna Raditsch
- Suzy Prim as La comtesse Olga Belsky
- Roger Karl as Le grand-duc Pierre
- Alfred Adam as Ossip
- Pierre Alcover as Le général Platoff
- Marcel André as L'amiral
- Junie Astor as Lucie Leroy
- Léon Bary as L'ami de Tomsky
- Marcel Herrand as Un officier russe au bal
- Sylvain Itkine as Un révolutionnaire
- Odette Talazac asLa baronne

== Bibliography ==
- Bessy, Maurice & Chirat, Raymond. Histoire du cinéma français: 1935–1939. Pygmalion, 1986.
- Crisp, Colin. Genre, Myth and Convention in the French Cinema, 1929–1939. Indiana University Press, 2002.
- Rège, Philippe. Encyclopedia of French Film Directors, Volume 1. Scarecrow Press, 2009.
