= My Aunt the Dictator =

1939 film

- Directed by: René Pujol
- Written by: René Pujol
- Based on: Maman Sabouleux by Eugène Labiche
- Starring: Marguerite Moreno; Armand Bernard; Fernand Charpin
- Cinematography: Pierre Montazel; Nikolai Toporkoff
- Edited by: André Versein
- Music by: Vincent Scotto
- Production company: Société Internationale des Films Français
- Distributed by: Nord Film
- Release date: 13 July 1939
- Running time: 95 minutes
- Country: France
- Language: French

My Aunt the Dictator (French: Ma tante dictateur) is a 1939 French comedy film directed by René Pujol and starring Marguerite Moreno, Armand Bernard and Fernand Charpin. It was based on the play Maman Sabouleux by Eugène Labiche. The film's sets were designed by the art directors Louis Le Barbenchon and Roland Quignon.

== Cast ==
- Marguerite Moreno as La tante
- Armand Bernard as Monsieur Nicolas
- Fernand Charpin as Monsieur Duclos
- Raymond Aimos as Voiturin - le barbier
- Pauline Carton as Eugénie - la bonne
- Jean Sinoël as Le notaire
- Gaby Wagner as Madeleine Fleur - une chanteuse
- Christian Gérard as Guy Leroy
- Jean Dunot as Robinet
- Jacotte as La petite Jacqueline
- Henri Charrett
- Françoise Fleury
- Anthony Gildès
- Charles Lemontier
- Alexandre Mihalesco
- Pierre Moreno
- Gaston Orbal
- Émile Riandreys
- Walter Rimels

== Bibliography ==
- Bessy, Maurice & Chirat, Raymond. Histoire du cinéma français: 1935-1939. Pygmalion, 1986.
- Crisp, Colin. Genre, Myth and Convention in the French Cinema, 1929-1939. Indiana University Press, 2002.
- Rège, Philippe. Encyclopedia of French Film Directors, Volume 1. Scarecrow Press, 2009.
