= Baccara (film) =

1935 film

- Directed by: Yves Mirande
- Produced by: André Daven
- Starring: Marcelle Chantal; Lucien Baroux; Jules Berry; Marcel André; Paul Clerget; Léon Arvel; Emile Saulieu; Claude Marty; Jean Gobet; Pierre Piérade; Pierre Sarda; Michel Serrault; Léonce Corne; Robert Ozanne
- Cinematography: Philippe Agostini; Michel Kelber; Louis Née
- Edited by: Jean Aron; Léonide Moguy; Marcelle Saysset
- Music by: Jean Lenoir
- Production company: Productions André Daven
- Distributed by: ACE
- Release date: 20 December 1935
- Running time: 91 minutes
- Country: France
- Language: French

Baccara is a 1935 French comedy film directed by Yves Mirande. The film's music was composed by Jean Lenoir.

== Cast ==
- Marcelle Chantal
- Lucien Baroux
- Jules Berry
- Marcel André
- Paul Clerget
- Léon Arvel
- Emile Saulieu
- Claude Marty
- Jean Gobet
- Pierre Piérade
- Pierre Sarda
- Michel Serrault
