= René Berthier =

French actor (1912–2001)

- Born: 7 July 1912; Paris, France
- Died: 13 August 2001 (aged 89); Paris, France
- Occupation: Actor
- Years active: 1948-1984 (film & TV)

René Berthier (July 7, 1912 – August 13, 2001) was a French film and television actor.

== Partial filmography ==
- Croisière pour l'inconnu (1948) - Fleuret
- I Like Only You (1949) - Le secrétaire
- Rendezvous in July (1949)
- Not Any Weekend for Our Love (1950) - Le docteur Étoffe
- Old Boys of Saint-Loup (1950) - Lahulotte - l'avocat
- Shadow and Light (1951) - Minor Role (uncredited)
- Boîte à vendre (1951, Short)
- We Are All Murderers (1952) - Un monsieur (uncredited)
- Follow That Man (1953) - Le curé (uncredited)
- Piédalu député (1954)
- Royal Affairs in Versailles (1954) - Le Gall (uncredited)
- Crainquebille (1954) - Dr. Mathieu
- Adam Is Eve (1954) - Le portier
- Service Entrance (1954) - Le docteur
- Interdit de séjour (1955) - Un inspecteur (uncredited)
- Razzia sur la chnouf (1955) - Le docteur (uncredited)
- Men in White (1955) - Un interne
- If Paris Were Told to Us (1956) - Minor rôle (uncredited)
- Elena and Her Men (1956) - (uncredited)
- La roue (1957)
- Fernand clochard (1957) -
- La peau de l'ours (1957) - (uncredited)
- Les Truands (1957) - (uncredited)
- Thérèse Étienne (1958)
- It's All Adam's Fault (1958)
- Le septième ciel (1958) - (uncredited)
- Back to the Wall (1958) - Le prêtre (uncredited)
- Montparnasse 19 (1958) - (uncredited)
- Le désordre et la nuit (1958) - Le réceptionniste du 'George V' (uncredited)
- Mimi Pinson (1958)
- En cas de malheur (1958) - Un journaliste (uncredited)
- Du rififi chez les femmes (1959) - Minor Role
- Green Harvest (1959)
- The President (1961) - Un parlementaire (uncredited)
- Two Are Guilty (1963) - (uncredited)
- The Restaurant (1966)
- Les risques du métier (1967) - Minor rôle (uncredited)
- À tout casser (1968) - L'associé de Morelli
- Le gendarme se marie (1968) - Berthier, l'adjoint du colonel
- Le Cercle Rouge (1970) - Le directeur de la P.J.
- Le gendarme en balade (1970) - Berthier, l'adjoint du colonel
- Don't Deliver Us from Evil (1971) - Gustave
- Les guichets du Louvre (1974)
- Cookies (1975) - Le V.R.P.
- Oublie-moi, Mandoline (1976)
- Que notre règne arrive (1976)
- Une fille cousue de fil blanc (1977)
- Comme la lune (1977) - Le père Pouplard
- The Gendarme and the Extra-Terrestrials (1977) - Berthier - l'adjoint du colonel
- Le gendarme et les gendarmettes (1982) - Berthier, l'adjoint du colonel (uncredited)

== Bibliography ==
- Ginette Vincendeau. Jean-Pierre Melville: An American in Paris.. British Film Institute, 2003.
