= Rail Pirates =

1938 film

- Directed by: Christian-Jaque
- Written by: Arno-Charles Brun; Christian-Jaque; Oscar Paul Gilbert
- Based on: Rail Pirates by Oscar Paul Gilbert
- Produced by: Adolphe Osso; Gilbert Renault-Decker
- Starring: Charles Vanel; Suzy Prim; Erich von Stroheim
- Cinematography: André Germain; Pierre Lebon; Marcel Lucien
- Edited by: William Barache
- Music by: Henri Verdun
- Production companies: Films Renault-Decker; Les Films Osso
- Distributed by: Comptoir Français du Film
- Release date: 19 January 1938
- Running time: 89 minutes
- Country: France
- Language: French

Rail Pirates (French: Les pirates du rail) is a 1938 French adventure film directed by Christian-Jaque and starring Charles Vanel, Suzy Prim and Erich von Stroheim. It was shot at the Victorine Studios in Nice and on location in the Camargue. The film's sets were designed by the art director Pierre Schild. It is based on a novel of the same title by the Belgian writer Oscar Paul Gilbert, who also contributed to the screenplay.

== Synopsis ==
Henri Pierson, an engineer on a railway running through Yunnan in China, tries to resist a series of bandit attacks on the train. Things come to a head when his wife Marie is taken as a hostage but the local warlord.

== Cast ==
- Charles Vanel as Henri Pierson
- Suzy Prim as Jeanne Rolland
- Erich von Stroheim as Tchou King
- Marcel Dalio as Le mercenaire
- Simone Renant as Marie Pierson
- Héléna Manson as Madame Teysseire
- Lucas Gridoux as Le général Tsai
- Georges Tourreil as Teysseire
- Jean Périer as Le Docteur Bureau
- Doumel as Morganti
- Marcel André as Ulrich
- Ky Duyen as Le lieutenant
- Régine Dancourt as Mme. Lauref
- Jacques Dumesnil as André Rolland
- Valéry Inkijinoff as Wang
- Michel André as Brocard
- Pierre Nay as Bernard
- Marcel Maupi as Titin

== Bibliography ==
- Crisp, Colin. French Cinema—A Critical Filmography: Volume 1, 1929-1939. Indiana University Press, 2015.
- Evans, Martin. Empire and Culture: The French Experience, 1830-1940. Springer, 2004.
- Goble, Alan. The Complete Index to Literary Sources in Film. Walter de Gruyter, 1999.
- Lennig, Arthur. Stroheim. University Press of Kentucky, 2004.
