= Pascal Tosi (director) =

French director, writer and editor

Pascal Tosi is a French director, writer and editor born in Lima, Peru. In 2004, he wrote and directed Photomateurs (Photograbber) which generated a lot of praise and 5 film festival awards.

== Filmography ==
=== Director ===
- 1996-01: DKTV - La planète de Donkey Kong
- 2001-02: MNK - Les Minikeums
- 2004: Photograbber - Short film (35 mm)
- 2007: Grandeur Nature - TV show

=== Writer ===
- 2004: Photograbber - Short film

=== Editor ===
- 1995: Variations - CGI short film by French director Daniel Borenstein
- 2006: Renaissance - animated film by French director Christian Volckman
  - Feature Film Award at the Annecy International Animated Film Festival (2006)
  - Silver Melies award at the Fantasporto (2007)
  - Qualified to compete in the best animated feature film category at the 79th Academy awards
