= Men in White (1955 film) =

1955 film

- Directed by: Ralph Habib
- Written by: Maurice Aubergé
- Based on: The Doctors, The Healing Oath[2] and Good-bye, Doctor Roch; 1947-1958 novels by André Soubiran
- Produced by: Paul Graetz
- Starring: Raymond Pellegrin; Jeanne Moreau; Jean Chevrier
- Cinematography: Pierre Petit
- Edited by: Françoise Javet
- Music by: Marcel Stern
- Production company: Transcontinental Films
- Distributed by: Columbia Films
- Release date: 10 May 1955
- Running time: 110 minutes
- Country: France
- Language: French

Men in White (French: Les hommes en blanc) is a 1955 French drama film directed by Ralph Habib and starring Raymond Pellegrin, Jeanne Moreau and Jean Chevrier. The film's sets were designed by the art director Robert Clavel.

== Cast ==
- Raymond Pellegrin as Dr. Jean Nérac
- Jeanne Moreau as Marianne Déjazet
- Jean Chevrier as Dr. Legendre
- Fernand Ledoux as Dr. Delpuech
- Jean Debucourt as Professeur Hauberger
- Robert Porte as Dr. Ricaud
- Mary Marquet as Mme. Ledragon
- Bernard Dhéran as Clément
- Christian Marquand as Philippon
- Olivier Hussenot as Thésée
- Gisèle Grandpré as Mme Daumont
- Paul Barge as Le bistrot
- René Berthier as Un interne
- Paul Bisciglia as Un interne
- Charles Bouillaud as Le guérisseur
- Christian Brocard
- Jacques Bézard
- André Dalibert as Un paysan
- Hubert de Lapparent as A patient
- Eddy Debray as L'homme du métro
- Françoise Delbart as Sarrazine
- Charles Denner as Un interne
- Pierre Duverger
- Lucien Frégis as Un paysan
- Émile Genevois as Le blessé de la main
- Ivan Govar
- Guy Henry
- Sylviane Humair
- Jacques Marin
- Anne-Marie Mersen
- Albert Michel as Un paysan
- Jacqueline Noëlle as Une malade
- Claire Olivier as Félicie
- Maryse Paillet as Une paysanne
- Georges Pierre
- Nicole Regnault
- Pascale Roberts as Vicky
- Evelyne Saint-Jean as Jacqueline
- Maurice Sarfati as Un interne
- Jean Sylvère as Le balayeur
- André Wasley as Un paysan

== Bibliography ==
- Crisp, C.G. The classic French cinema, 1930-1960. Indiana University Press, 1993
