= Suzy Prim =

French actress (1896–1991)

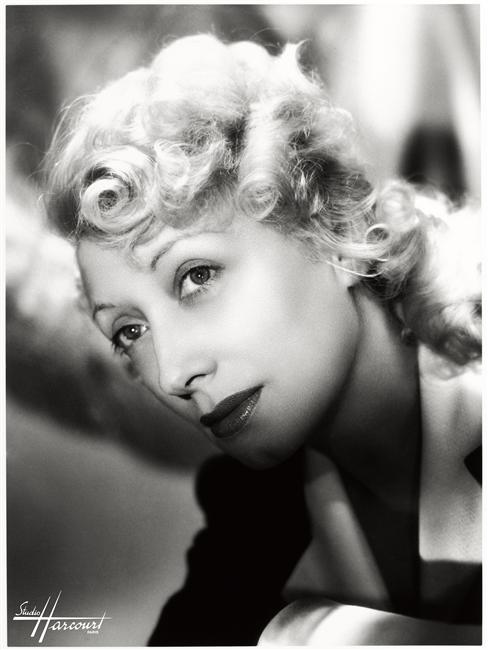
- Born: Suzanne Mariette Arduini; 11 October 1896; Paris, Ile-de-France, France
- Died: 8 July 1991 (aged 94); Boulogne-Billancourt, Hauts-de-Seine, France
- Occupation: Actress
- Years active: 1910–1976 (film)

Suzy Prim (11 October 1896 – 7 July 1991) was a French actress.

She was born Suzanne Mariette Arduini in Paris and died in 1991 in Boulogne-Billancourt. She began her screen career as a child actress during the silent era.

== Selected filmography ==
- Carmen (1914)
- Madame Coralie & C. (1914)
- Les écrits restent (1917)
- Le Noël d'Yveline (1918)
- Haine (1918)
- Appassionatamente (1919)
- Passionnément (1920)
- Il suo destino (1921)
- La reine Lumière (1921) - Huguette Landry ' Reine Lumière '
- Un drame d'amour (1921) - Diane d'Évremont
- L'aiglonne (1922) - Madame de Navailles
- Mon coeur et ses millions (1931) - Marguerite Mirgaudon
- Un petit trou pas cher (1934)
- La Bandera (1935) - (uncredited)
- The Squadron's Baby (1935) - Mathilde
- Marie des angoisses (1935) - Marfa
- Mayerling (1936) - La comtesse Larisch
- Samson (1936) - Grace Ritter
- La Peur (1936) - L'actrice
- Moutonnet (1936) - Dolly
- In the Service of the Tsar (1936) - La comtesse Olga Belsky
- A Legionnaire (1936) - Maryse
- The Brighton Twins (1936) - Clémentine Beaugérard
- 27 Rue de la Paix (1936) - Jenny Clarens
- Au service du tsar (1936) - La comtesse Olga Belsky
- The Lower Depths (1936) - Vassilissa Kostyleva
- White Cargo (1937) - Estella
- La reine des resquilleuses (1937) - Véra
- Arsene Lupin, Detective (1937) - Olga Vauban
- The Call of Life (1937) - Madame Voisin
- The Dark Angels (1937) - Catherine
- Arsène Lupin contre Arsène Lupin (1937)
- Êtes-vous jalouse? (1938) - Germaine Moreuil
- Rail Pirates (1938) - Jeanne Rolland
- Princess Tarakanova (1938) - L'imperatrice Caterina II / L'impératrice Catherine II
- The Patriot (1938) - Anna Ostermann
- Alexis, Gentleman Chauffeur (1938) - Madame Tabasco aka alias Margot Fontane
- Crossroads (1938) - Michèle Allain
- Berlingot and Company (1939) - Isabelle Grandville
- Farinet ou l'or dans la montagne (1939) - Joséphine Pellanda
- Case of Conscience (1939) - Madeleine Granval
- Strange Suzy (1941) - Suzy
- The Benefactor (1942) - Irène Berger
- Les petits riens (1942) - Louise
- After the Storm (1943) - Catherine Grand
- The Heart of a Nation (1943) - Estelle Froment adulte
- Shop Girls of Paris (1943) - Madame Desforges
- The London Man (1943) - Camélia
- La Rabouilleuse (1944) - Flore Brazier, la rabouilleuse
- La Malibran (1944) - La comtesse Merlin
- The Ménard Collection (1944) - Madame Ménard
- Majestic Hotel Cellars (1945) - Émilie Petersen
- Le cabaret du grand large (1946) - Reine
- Three Investigations (1948) - Irène
- The Sinners (1949) - Mademoiselle Chamblas
- Farewell Mister Grock (1950) - La comtesse Barinoff
- The Two Girls (1951) - Mademoiselle Bénazer
- Trafic sur les dunes (1951) - Madame Estelle
- The Case of Doctor Galloy (1951) - L'amie de Mme Guérin
- Follow That Man (1953) - Mme Olga
- Les Compagnes de la nuit (1953) - Pierrette
- Le Feu dans la peau (1954) - Maria, la parfumeuse
- The Babes Make the Law (1955) - Flora - la mère
- Memories of a Cop (1956) - Lola
- Lorsque l'enfant paraît (1956) - Madeleine Lonant
- Twelve Hours By the Clock (1959) - Madame César
- Les lionceaux (1960) - Blanche Eroli
- Profession: Aventuriers (1973) - Eléonore
- Body of My Enemy (1976) - La mère de Marie-Adélaïde (final film role)
