= Jacques Houssin =

French film director and screenwriter

- Born: 19 September 1902; Paris, France
- Died: 8 May 1979 (aged 76); Paris, France
- Occupations: Film director Screenwriter

Jacques Houssin (19 September 1902 – 8 May 1979) was a French film director and screenwriter.

== Filmography ==
=== Director ===
- Plein aux as (1933)
- Odette (1935)
- The Happy Road (1936)
- Rendez-vous Champs-Élysées (1937)
- The Two Schemers (1938)
- Prince Bouboule (1939)
- Feux de joie (1939)
- Mistral (1943)
- Feu Nicolas (1943)
- Le Merle blanc (1944)
- The Secret of Florida (1947)
- Are You Sure? with Martine Carol (1947)
- Vient de paraître after the play by Édouard Bourdet (1949)

=== Assistant director ===
- 1929 : The Shark by Henri Chomette
- 1930 : Under the Roofs of Paris by René Clair
- 1932 : Barranco, Ltd, by André Berthomieu
- 1933 : Prenez garde à la peinture, by Henri Chomette
