= André-Paul Antoine =

French film director and screenwriter (1892–1982)

- Born: 11 October 1892; Paris, France
- Died: 7 August 1982 (aged 89); Paris, France
- Occupations: Writer, Director
- Years active: 1922-1971

André-Paul Antoine (11 October 1892–7 August 1982) was a French screenwriter. He also directed two films and a documentary during the early 1930s.

== Selected filmography ==
- The Mysteries of Paris (1922)
- Le Miracle des loups (1924)
- My Heart Incognito (1931)
- Return to Paradise (1935)
- Koenigsmark (1935)
- Disk 413 (1936)
- A Picnic on the Grass (1937)
- Widow's Island (1937)
- The Lafarge Case (1938)
- Crossroads (1938)
- Immediate Call (1939)
- Savage Brigade (1939)
- There's No Tomorrow (1939)
- The Marvelous Night (1940)
- The Emigrant (1940)
- Sarajevo (1940)
- The Crossroads (1942)
- Pierre and Jean (1943)
- The White Truck (1943)
- Bifur 3 (1945)
- The Black Cavalier (1945)
- Star Without Light (1946)
- The Temptation of Barbizon (1946)
- The Secret of Florida (1947)
- The Three Cousins (1947)
- The Lost Village (1947)
- Bed for Two; Rendezvous with Luck (1950)
- Bluebeard (1951)
- Dakota 308 (1951)
- Sins of Madeleine (1951)
- The Nude Dancer (1952)
- Alarm in Morocco (1953)
- Sins of Paris (1953)
- French Cancan (1954)

== Bibliography ==
- Klossner, Michael. The Europe of 1500-1815 on Film and Television: A Worldwide Filmography of Over 2550 Works, 1895 Through 2000. McFarland, 2002.
