= Albert Préjean =

French actor (1894–1979)

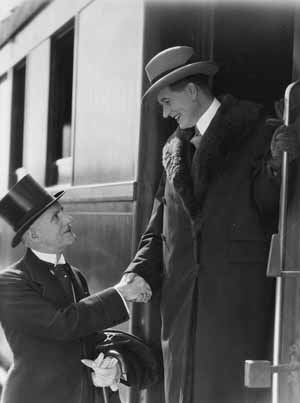
- Albert Préjean (right) and Henry Roussel in Les Nouveaux Messieurs in 1929
- Born: 27 October 1894; Paris, France
- Died: 1 November 1979 (aged 85); Paris, France
- Occupations: Actor, Singer
- Years active: 1921–1960

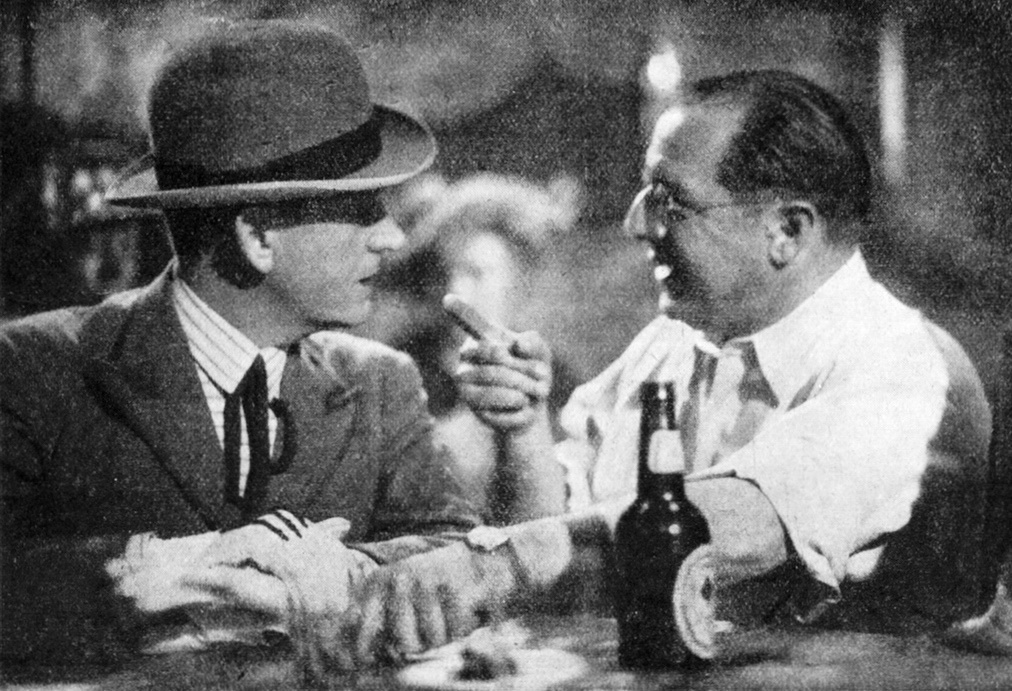
Film director Georg Wilhelm Pabst (right) and actor Albert Préjean (as Mackie Messer) while filming L'Opéra de quat'sous (The Threepenny Opera) in 1931

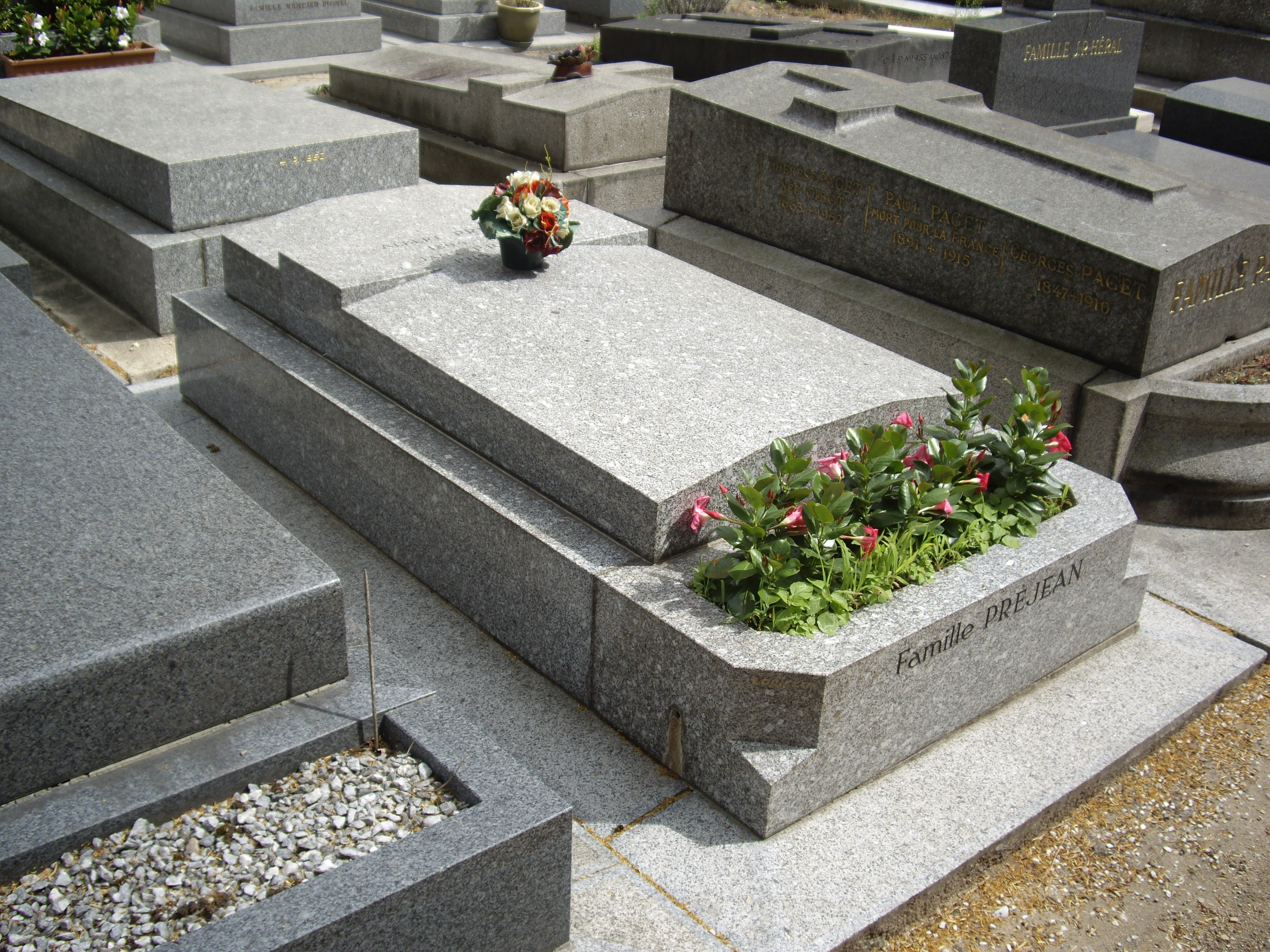
His grave in Auteuil Cemetery (Paris)

Albert Préjean (French pronunciation: [albɛʁ pʁeʒɑ̃]; 27 October 1894 – 1 November 1979) was a French actor and singer, primarily in film. He served in World War I, and was decorated with the Croix de Guerre and the Legion of Honour. With Lysiane Rey, he was the father of Patrick Préjean, and grandfather of Laura Préjean.

== Early life ==
Préjean was born on 27 October 1894 in Paris.

== Career ==
Préjean shot his first five films with French director Henri Diamant-Berger between 1921 and 1923. The roles he played tended to embody the leading man for the people, generous and strong. His most lasting fame stems from his work in the films of René Clair that transition from the silent to the sound eras. These include most notably the farce Un Chapeau de Paille d'Italie (1928) and the musicalized melancomic Sous les toits de Paris (1930). When German director G. W. Pabst directed the film version of the huge Brecht-Weill musical hit Die Dreigroschenoper in 1931, he simultaneously shot a French-language version (L'opéra de quat'sous) with a French lead cast. Préjean was given the coveted lead role of the underworld kingpin Mackie Messer.

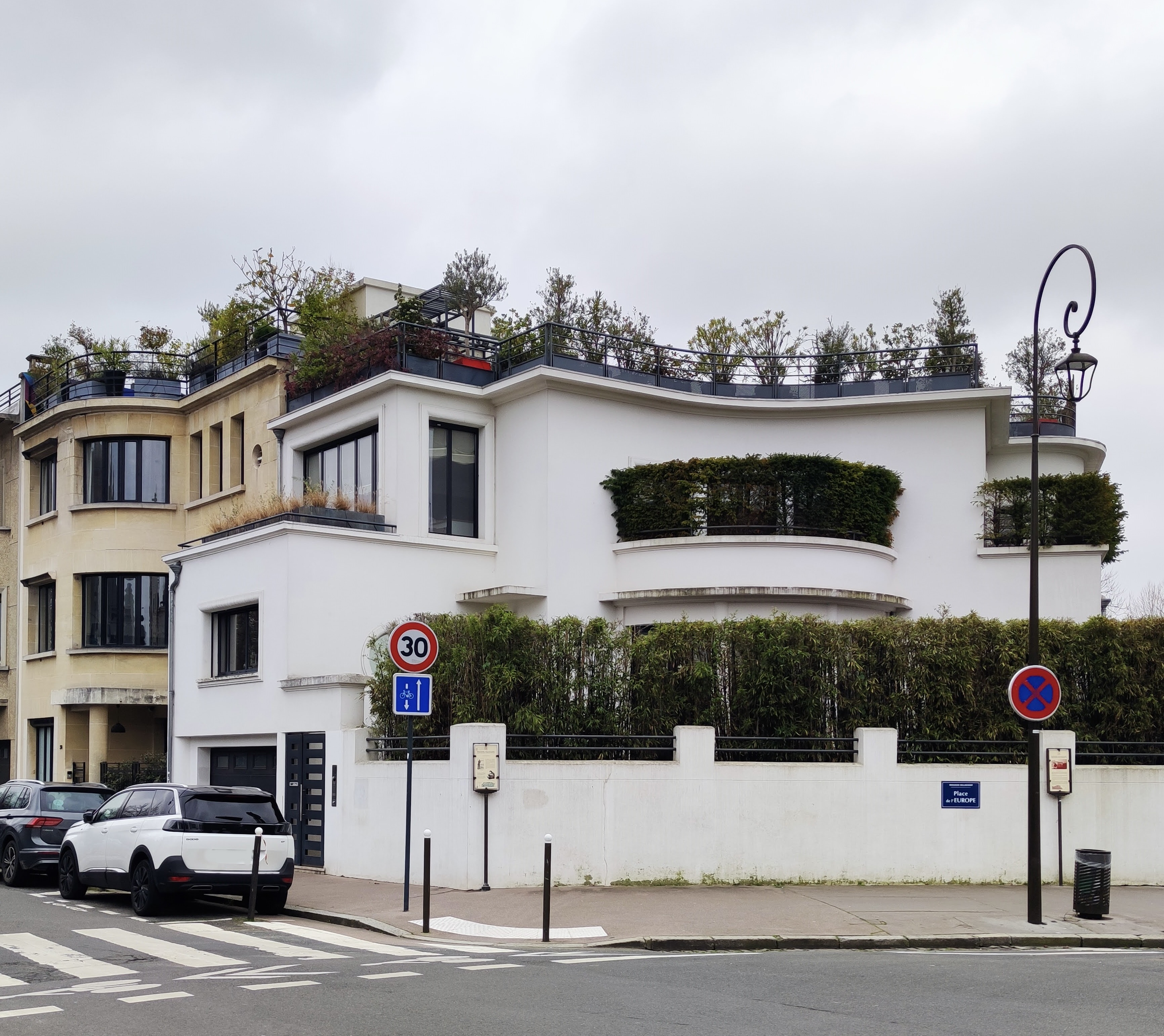
House of Albert Préjean in Boulogne-Billancourt

In 1929, he directed a medium-length film L'Aventure de Luna-Park with Daniele Parola. In addition to acting, he was also a popular singer in the 1930s. He sang songs like "La Valse to Dede Montmartre".

=== World War II ===
During World War II he continued to act in films. In March 1942, he joined a group of actors who at the invitation of the Germans visited film studios in Berlin. This was alongside French actors and actresses such as René Dary, Astor Junie, Viviane Romance, Suzy Delair and Danielle Darrieux.

He recollected his memories in a book published in 1979 with the help of his son, voice actor Patrick Préjean.

== Honours and awards ==
- Chevalier of the Order of Legion of Honour
- Croix de Guerre 1914-1918
- Médaille Militaire

== Death ==
Préjean died on 1 November 1979 in Paris.

== Selected filmography ==
- Le Miracle des loups (1924)
- The Phantom of the Moulin Rouge (1925)
- The Crazy Ray (1925)
- The Imaginary Voyage (1926)
- Mademoiselle's Chauffeur (1928)
- The Italian Straw Hat (1928)
- Verdun: Visions of History (1929)
- Les Nouveaux Messieurs (1929)
- The Shark (1930)
- Under the Roofs of Paris (1930)
- L'Opéra de quat'sous (1931)
- Amourous Adventure (1932)
- A Son from America (1932)
- Madame Makes Her Exit (1932)
- Sailor's Song (1932)
- Honeymoon Trip (1933)
- Toto (1933)
- Theodore and Company (1933)
- Volga in Flames (1934)
- The Princess's Whim (1934)
- The Crisis is Over (1934)
- One Night's Secret (1934)
- Gold in the Street (1934)
- Moses and Solomon, Perfumers (1935)
- Paris Camargue (1935)
- Honeymoon (1935)
- Dédé (1935)
- Princess Tam Tam (1935)
- Jenny (1936)
- The Alibi (1937)
- In Venice, One Night (1937)
- Mollenard (1938)
- Unknown of Monte Carlo (1939)
- Metropolitan (1939)
- Place de la Concorde (1939)
- Cristobal's Gold (1940)
- Strange Suzy (1941)
- Caprices (1942)
- Shop Girls of Paris (1943)
- Picpus as Inspector Maigret
- Cecile Is Dead (1944) as Inspector Maigret
- Majestic Hotel Cellars (1945)
- The Murderer is Not Guilty (1946)
- The Scarlet Bazaar (1947)
- The Secret of Florida (1947)
- The Bouquinquant Brothers (1947)
- The Idol (1948)
- The New Masters (1950)
- Love and Desire (1951)
- Love in the Vineyard (1952)
- A Missionary (1955)
- Chéri-Bibi (1955)
- Bombs on Monte Carlo (1960)
- Good Luck, Charlie (1962)
