= Benoît Allemane =

French actor (1942–2025)

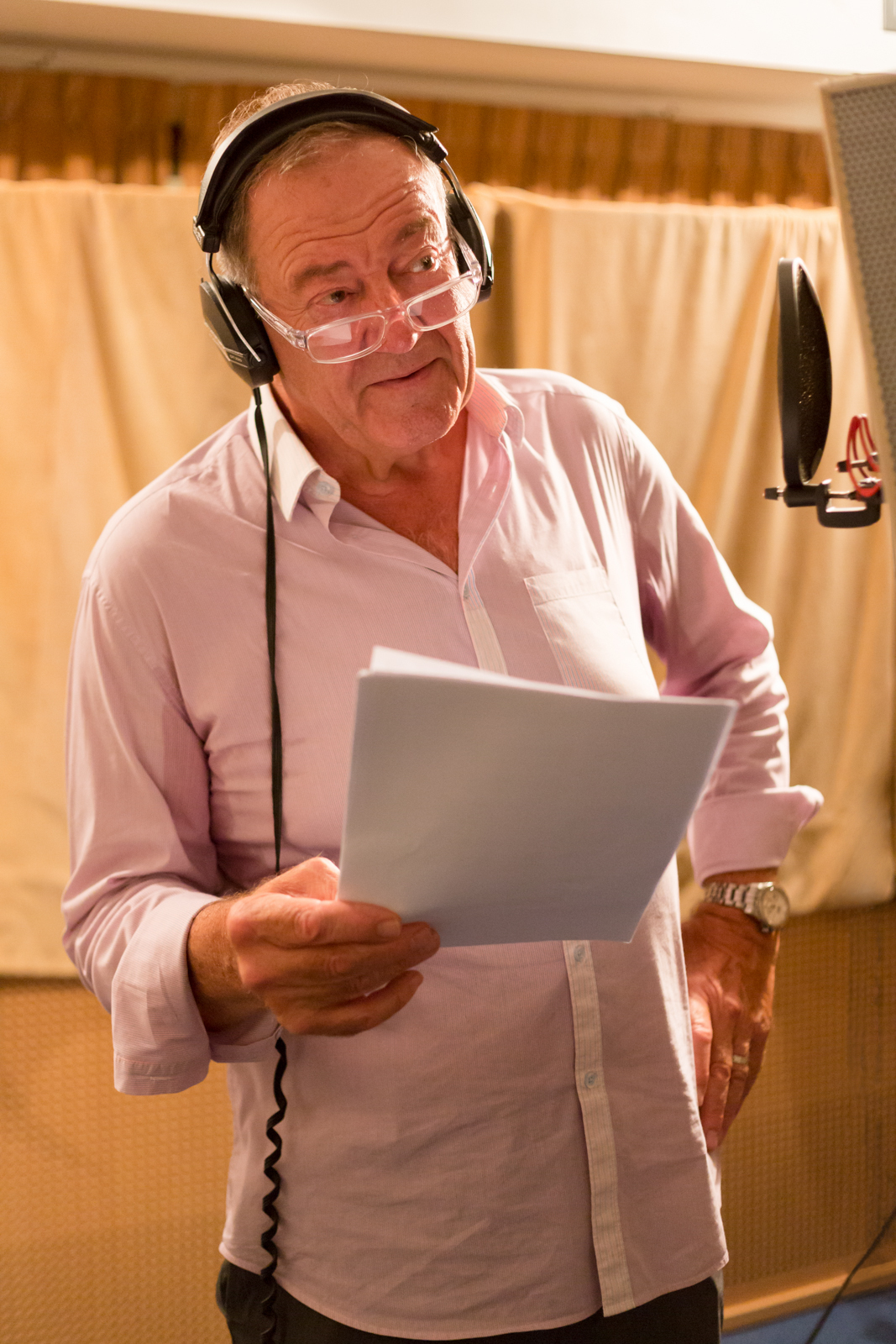
- Allemane in 2015
- Born: 28 December 1942; Clermont-Ferrand, France
- Died: 5 January 2025 (aged 82); Puteaux, France
- Occupation: Actor
- Years active: 1963–2025

Benoît Allemane (28 December 1942 – 5 January 2025) was a French actor known for working in voice-over and dubbing roles. He was the official French dub-over voice of Morgan Freeman. He also provided the voice of King Harkinian in Link: The Faces of Evil.

Allemane also provided the voice-over for almost every commercial and trailer of the VHS tapes by Walt Disney Home Entertainment in France. He died in Puteaux on 5 January 2025, eight days after his 82nd birthday.

== Roles ==
=== Filmography ===
- 1980: Julien Fontanes, magistrat (1 Episode)

=== Television animation ===
- Wakfu (Grougaloragran)
- Argai: The Prophecy (Pacha)
- Chris Colorado (Jack Mitchell)
- Fullmetal Alchemist (Alex Louis Armstrong)
- Gadget and the Gadgetinis (Doctor Claw)
- Gargoyles (Goliath)
- TaleSpin (Baloo)
- Castle in the Sky (General)
- An American Tail: The Treasure of Manhattan Island (Mr. Grasping)

=== OVA ===
- The Land Before Time series (Grandpa)

=== Theatrical animation ===
- Hercules (Zeus)
- We're Back! A Dinosaur's Story (Rex)

=== Video games ===
- Alan Wake (Pat Maine) local radio night host on Bright Falls KBF-FM Radio (French)
- Blood Omen 2 (Kain)
- Diablo II (Qual Kehk)
- Fable II (Abbot)
- Guild Wars Nightfall (General Morgahn)
- Harry Potter and the Philosopher's Stone (Rubeus Hagrid)
- Halo 2 (Tartarus)
- Kingdom Hearts II (Yen Sid)
- Legacy of Kain: Defiance (Kain)
- Legacy of Kain: Soul Reaver (Kain, The Elder God)
- The Legend of Spyro: A New Beginning (Terrador)
- The Legend of Spyro: The Eternal Night (Terrador)
- The Legend of Spyro: Dawn of the Dragon (Terrador)
- Link: The Faces of Evil (King Harkinian)
- The Lion King: Simba's Mighty Adventure (Mufasa)
- Looney Tunes Racing (Foghorn Leghorn)
- Looney Tunes: Space Race (Foghorn Leghorn)
- Mass Effect (Sovereign)
- MediEvil: Resurrection (Narrator, Death)
- Le Pic Rouge: L'auberge de l'alpiniste mort
- Sherlock Holmes: The Awakened (Sherlock Holmes)
- Sherlock Holmes: Secret of the Silver Earring (Sherlock Holmes)
- Sherlock Holmes versus Arsène Lupin (Sherlock Holmes)
- Skylanders: Spyro's Adventure (Stump Smash)
- Skylanders: Giants (Stump Smash, Tree Rex)
- Soul Reaver 2 (Kain, The Elder God)
- The Simpsons Game (Space museum commentator)
- Titan Quest (Jade Emperor)
- The Witcher (Vesemir)
- Zelda: The Wand of Gamelon (King Harkinian)
- Sonic the Hedgehog series (Zavok)

=== Live action ===
- The Frighteners (Sheriff Walt Perry)
- The League of Extraordinary Gentlemen (Captain Nemo)
- Looney Tunes: Back in Action (Foghorn Leghorn)
- The Meteor Man (Earnest Moses)
- Morgan Freeman
- The Naked Gun: From the Files of Police Squad! (Captain Ed Hocken)
- The Naked Gun 2½: The Smell of Fear (Captain Ed Hocken)
- Naked Gun 33 1/3: The Final Insult (Captain Ed Hocken)
- Star Wars: Episode II – Attack of the Clones (Lama Su Kaminoan)

=== Commercials ===
- Frosted Flakes (Tony the Tiger)
