= The Shark (1930 film) =

1930 film

- Directed by: Henri Chomette
- Written by: Henri Chomette
- Starring: Albert Préjean; Gina Manès; Daniel Mendaille
- Cinematography: Jean Bachelet; Léonce-Henri Burel; Frank Clifford
- Edited by: René Le Hénaff
- Music by: J.E. Szyfer
- Production company: Films Sonores Tobis
- Distributed by: Films Sonores Tobis
- Release date: 14 March 1930
- Running time: 90 minutes
- Country: France
- Language: French

The Shark (French:Le requin) is a 1930 French film directed by Henri Chomette and starring Albert Préjean, Gina Manès and Daniel Mendaille. Made in 1929 but released the following year, it was one of the first French sound films.

The story concerns a shipowner who on the edge of financial failure, bribes accomplices to sink his ship for the insurance. He is accused of fraud and it come to court but he acquitted only to be shot dead by his wife who narrowly escaped the sinking.

The film's sets were designed by Lazare Meerson.

== Cast ==
- Albert Préjean as Le capitaine
- Gina Manès as Violette
- Daniel Mendaille as Le second
- Rudolf Klein-Rogge as Vasseur
- Samson Fainsilber as L'avocat
- Nicole de Rouves
- Edmond Van Daële as Le radio
- Andrée Standart as L'amie d'un soir
- Pierre Juvenet as L'avocat général
- Hubert Daix as Le courtier
- André Allard as Le président

== Bibliography ==
- Bock, Hans-Michael & Bergfelder, Tim. The Concise CineGraph. Encyclopedia of German Cinema. Berghahn Books, 2009.
