= Paul Nivoix =

French playwright and screenwriter

Paul Eugène Nivoix (24 December 1889 - 14 September 1958) was a French playwright and screenwriter.

== Theater ==
With Marcel Pagnol:

- Tonton 1924
- Les Marchands de gloire 1925
- Un direct au cœur 1926.

== Filmography ==
- 1932: A little love by Hans Steinhoff, adaptation and dialogue.
- 1932: Direct to the heart by Roger Lion and Alexandre Arnaudy, script and dialogue, from his play co-written with Marcel Pagnol.
- 1937: In Venice, One Night by Christian-Jaque, screenplay.
- 1937: The House Opposite by Christian-Jaque, screenplay from his play.
- 1938: Barnabé by Alexandre Esway, dialogue.
- 1943: Mahlia the mestizo by Walter Kapps, dialogue.
- 1948: Émile l'Africain by Robert Vernay, screenplay.
- 1949: The New Masters by Paul Nivoix, realization, after his eponymous play.
