= Claude Sylvain =

French actress and singer

- Born: 9 May 1930; Neuilly-Plaisance, Seine-et-Oise, France
- Died: 31 December 2005 (aged 75); Vaux-sur-Lunain, Seine-et-Marne, France
- Occupation: Actor
- Years active: 1954–1984 (film & TV)

Claude Sylvain (1930–2005) was a French actor and singer. After appearing in films of the 1950s, playing in a mixture of female lead and supporting roles, she switched to appear as a performer in cabaret where she met her husband Francis Claude.

== Filmography ==
Year	Title	Role	Notes
1954	On Trial	Mélita	
1954	Service Entrance	Une copine de Léo	
1954	Madame du Barry	Une fille chez La Gourdan	
1954	The Red and the Black	Amanda Binet	Uncredited
1955	Tower of Lust	La servante de l'auberge	
1955	Rififi	Ida Ferrati	
1955	Don Camillo's Last Round	Clotilde	
1956	If Paris Were Told to Us	Catherine de Médicis jeune	
1956	Si tous les gars du monde...	Totoche	
1956	In the Manner of Sherlock Holmes	Viviane Deroches	
1956	Blood to the Head	Raymonde Babin	
1957	The Man in the Raincoat	Florence	
1959	Les affreux		
1965	Le Majordome		Uncredited

== Bibliography ==
- Powrie, Phil. The Cinema of France. Wallflower Press, 2006.
