= Bruno Choël =

French actor (born 1954)

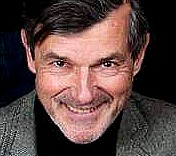
- Choël in November 2016
- Born: 19 July 1954 (age 71)
- Occupation: Actor
- Years active: 1979-present

Bruno Choël (born 19 July 1954) is a French actor who specialises in dubbing. He is the French voice of Ewan McGregor and Johnny Depp.

== Voiceography ==
=== Television programmes ===
- Angel (Groosalugg (Mark Lutz))
- Argai: The Prophecy (Prince Argai)
- Cold Case (Detective Chris Lassing (Justin Chambers))
- Eyes (Harlan Judd (Tim Daly))
- Jake 2.0 (Kyle Duarte (Philip Anthony-Rodriguez))
- Killer Instinct (Detective Jack Hale (Johnny Messner))
- Kojak (Detective Bobby Crocker (Michael Kelly))
- Lost (Desmond Hume (Henry Ian Cusick))
- One Piece (Monkey D. Garp (Vincent Regan)
- Party of Five (Bailey Salinger (Scott Wolf))
- Reba (Van Montgomery (Steve Howey))
- Studio 60 on the Sunset Strip (Jack Rudolph (Steven Weber))
- Surface (Davis Lee (Ian Anthony Dale))
- Tru Calling (Davis (Zach Galifianakis))
- Watching Ellie (Ben Radfield (Darren Boyd))
- The West Wing (Samuel Seaborn (Rob Lowe))
- Young Americans (Scout Calhoun (Mark Famiglietti))

=== Films ===
(partial list)

- Sleepy Hollow : Constable Ichabod Crane (Johnny Depp)
- Pirates of the Caribbean (film series) : Jack Sparrow (Johnny Depp)
- Fantastic Beasts and Where to Find Them and Fantastic Beasts: The Crimes of Grindelwald : Gellert Grindelwald (Johnny Depp)
- Alice Through the Looking Glass : Hatter Tarrant Hightopp (Johnny Depp)
- Murder on the Orient Express : John Cassetti, alias Edward Ratchett (Johnny Depp)
- Star Wars prequel trilogy : Obi-Wan Kenobi (Ewan McGregor)
- Black Hawk Down : John Grimes (Ewan McGregor)
- Big Fish : Young Edward Bloom (Ewan McGregor)
- I Love You Phillip Morris : Phillip Morris (Ewan McGregor)
- Sahara : Dirk Pitt (Matthew McConaughey)
- Interstellar : Joseph Cooper (Matthew McConaughey)
- Memento : James F. "Jimmy" Grantz (Larry Holden)
- Collateral : Vincent (Tom Cruise)
- Renaissance : Pierre Amiel
- Final Fantasy VII: Advent Children : Sephiroth (Toshiyuki Morikawa)
- Dinosaur : Aladar (D. B. Sweeney)

=== Television animation ===
- Argai: The Prophecy (Argaï)
- The Simpsons (Alec Baldwin)
- Star Wars: Clone Wars (Obi-Wan Kenobi (James Arnold Taylor))
- Superman: The Animated Series (Parasite (Brion James))

=== Video games ===
- Assassin's Creed (Altaïr Ibn-La'Ahad)
- Beyond Good & Evil (Nino, Francis)
- Kingdom Hearts (Sephiroth (Lance Bass))
- Kingdom Hearts II (Sephiroth (George Newbern), Captain Jack Sparrow (James Arnold Taylor), Prince Eric (Christopher Daniel Barnes))
- Uncharted series (Nathan Drake)
- Final Fantasy VII Remake (Sephiroth)
- World of Warcraft (Rhonin)
