= Henri Labussière =

French actor (1921–2008)

Henri Labussière (1921–2008) was a French actor. He mostly appeared on stage in various comedy plays between 1949 and 2000. As a film actor he starred in Yves Robert's War of the Buttons (La Guerre des boutons) in 1962.

== Partial filmography ==
- Un cheval pour deux (1962) - L'agent de police Léon
- War of the Buttons (1962) - A countryman
- Les copains (1965) - Minor rôle (uncredited)
- Les malabars sont au parfum (1966) - M. Pincard - le ministre de l'Intérieur
- Le caïd de Champignol (1966) - Le brigadier
- Kiss Me General (1966) - L'aubergiste
- Le dimanche de la vie (1967)
- Asterix the Gaul (1967) - Petit rôle (voice, uncredited)
- Asterix and Cleopatra (1968) - Panoramix, le druide (voice)
- Une baleine qui avait mal aux dents (1974) - Henri
- The Twelve Tasks of Asterix (1976) - Le réceptionniste (voice)
- The Smurfs and the Magic Flute (1976) - Le pêcheur (voice)
- L'amour en herbe (1977) - Le proviseur
- La Ballade des Dalton (1978) - L'imprimeur (voice)
- The Dogs (1979) - Montagnac, le pharmacien
- The Twin (1984) - Le maire
- Asterix Versus Caesar (1985) - Panoramix, le druide (voice)
- Asterix in Britain (1986) - Panoramix, le druide (voice)
- Babar: The Movie (1989) - Old Tusk (French version, voice)
- Asterix and the Big Fight (1989) - Panoramix, le druide (voice)
- The Incredible Crash Dummies (TV special) (1993) - Dr. Zub (voice)
- Asterix Conquers America (1994) - Panoramix, le druide (voice)
- Le dernier des pélicans (1996)
