= Laura Préjean =

French actress (born 1978)

- Born: 1978 (age 47–48)
- Occupation: Actress
- Father: Patrick Préjean
- Relatives: Albert Préjean (grandfather); Lysiane Rey (grandmother)

Laura Préjean (born 1978) is a French actress who is the daughter of actor Patrick Préjean and the granddaughter of actors Albert Préjean and Lysiane Rey.

== Dubbing roles ==
=== Television animation ===
- Argai: The Prophecy (Angéle)
- American Dragon: Jake Long (Rose (Mae Whitman))
- Avatar: The Last Airbender (Katara (Mae Whitman))
- Love Hina (Mitsune "Kitsune" Konno (Junko Noda))
- As Told by Ginger (Miranda Killgallen (Cree Summer))
- Teen Titans (Terra (Ashley Johnson))
- Totally Spies! (G.L.A.D.I.S.)
- My Life as a Teenage Robot (Jenny Wakeman/XJ-9 (Janice Kawaye))
- Miraculous: Tales of Ladybug & Cat Noir (Socqueline Wang)

=== Theatrical animation ===
- Howl's Moving Castle (Young Sophie (Chieko Baisho))

=== Live-action ===
- The Butterfly Effect (Kayley Miller (Amy Smart))
- Charlie's Angels (Dylan Sanders (Drew Barrymore))
- Charlie's Angels: Full Throttle (Dylan Sanders (Drew Barrymore))
- Constantine (Angela and Isabel Dodson (Rachel Weisz))
- Coyote Ugly (Cammie (Izabella Miko))
- Hitch (Allegra Cole (Amber Valletta))
- The Mummy (Evelyn Carnahan (Rachel Weisz))
- The Mummy Returns (Evelyn Carnahan (Rachel Weisz))
- The Good Place (Eleanor Shellstrop (Kristen Bell))

=== Television ===
- 2011-2014 : Joséphine, ange gardien (2 episodes)
- 2007-2019 : The Big Bang Theory (Penny (Kaley Cuoco)) (279 episodes)
