= Pierre-Jean Ducis =

French film director (1907–1980)

- Born: Pierre Émile Jacques Ducis; 5 March 1907; Paris
- Died: 24 June 1980 (aged 73); Neuilly-sur-Seine
- Occupation: Film director

Pierre-Jean Ducis (5 March 1907 - 24 June 1980) was a French film director. He mainly directed short films.

== Filmography ==
- 1932: Le Dernier Preux
- 1933: Gudule
- 1933: Deux picon-grenadine
- 1933: La Prison de Saint-Clothaire
- 1934: Le Cavalier Lafleur
- 1934: Quatre à Troyes
- 1934: Un Petit Trou pas cher
- 1934: Le Coup de parapluie (short film)
- 1934: Le Centenaire (short film)
- 1935: Honeymoon
- 1935: Le Crime de monsieur Pégotte
- 1935: Les Deux Docteurs
- 1935: La Clef des champs
- 1936: Au son des guitares
- 1936: Œil de lynx, détective
- 1936: The Blue Mouse
- 1936: The Assault
- 1937: In the Sun of Marseille
- 1938: Un fichu métier
- 1940: Sur le plancher des vaches
- 1941: Strange Suzy
- 1943: After the Storm
