= Patricia Legrand =

French actress

Patricia Legrand is a French actress who specializes in dubbing.

== Roles ==
=== Television animation ===
- The Adventures of Tintin (Zorrino)
- Argai: The Prophecy (Miss Moon)
- Back to the Future: The Animated Series (Clara Brown)
- Batman: The Animated Series (Renee Montoya, Talia al Ghul)
- Cardcaptor Sakura (Sakura Kinomoto)
- Chowder (Panini)
- Cowboy Bebop (Edward Wong Hau Pepelu Tivrusky IV)
- Ghost in the Shell: Stand Alone Complex (Tachikoma)
- Haibane Renmei (Rakka)
- Hamtaro (Hamtaro)
- Looney Tunes (Tweety Bird)
- The Magic School Bus (Dorothy Ann)
- Mr. Men and Little Miss (Additional voices)
- Princess Gwenevere and the Jewel Riders (Spike, Cleo, Sugar)
- Rayman: The Animated Series (Betina)
- Redwall (Cornflower)
- Secret of Cerulean Sand (Jane Buxton)
- Sonic Underground (Sonia the Hedgehog)
- Tico of the Seven Seas (Maggie)
- The Vision of Escaflowne (Merle)
- The Wacky World of Tex Avery (Khannie, Maurice)
- The Loud House (Luna Loud)

=== OVA ===
- Karas (Amefurikozō)

=== Theatrical animation ===
- Escaflowne (Merle)
- James and the Giant Peach (Glowworm)

=== Video games ===
- Crash: Mind over Mutant (Coco Bandicoot, Nina Cortex, Brat Girls)
- Crash Nitro Kart (Coco Bandicoot)
- Crash of the Titans (Coco Bandicoot, Nina Cortex, Brat Girls)
- Crash Tag Team Racing (Coco Bandicoot, Nina Cortex)
- Crash Twinsanity (Coco Bandicoot)
- Moshi Monsters Friends (Kazuki, Tingaling, Scamp)
- Cookie Run: Kingdom (Strawberry Crepe Cookie)

=== Live Action ===
- Baby Mama (Angela "Angie" Ostrowiski)
- Dr. Quinn, Medicine Woman (Brian Cooper)
- Family Matters (Judy Winslow, Richie Crawford, Maxine Johnson)
- Men in Trees (Mai Washington)
- Pushing Daisies (Olive Snook)
- Scooby-Doo 2: Monsters Unleashed (Velma Dinkley)
- Space Jam (Tweety Bird)
- The Magic Voyage (Marilyn)
- The West Wing (Annabeth Schott)
- The Young and the Restless (Cassie Newman)
