= Marcel André =

French actor (1885–1974)

- Born: 2 January 1885; Paris, France
- Died: 13 October 1974 (aged 89); Paris, France
- Occupation: Actor
- Years active: 1913–1974 (film)

Marcel André (2 January 1885 – 13 October 1974) was a French film actor.

== Selected filmography ==
- Si l'empereur savait ça (1930) - Albert (Master of the Horse)
- Soyons gais (1930) - Townley
- Le père célibataire (1931)
- The Trial of Mary Dugan (1931) - West
- Luck (1931) - Le docteur Gaston
- Amourous Adventure (1932) - Jacques Varnier
- Tumultes (1932) - Le commissaire
- Coup de feu à l'aube (1932) - Schmitter
- Quick (1932) - Le docteur
- Un peu d'amour (1932) - Maxime
- The Agony of the Eagles (1933) - Le préfet de police
- Dream Castle (1933) - Le metteur en scène / The film director
- Une vie perdue (1933)
- La margoton du bataillon (1933) - Le capitaine
- Léopold le bien-aimé (1934) - L'abbé
- The Concierge's Daughters (1934) - Gaston Rival
- Song of Farewell (1934) - Friedrich Karlbrenner
- Cease Firing (1934) - Baron
- Return to Paradise (1935) - Le docteur Bouvard
- Baccara (1935) - Maître Lebel
- The First Offence (1936)
- L'argent (1936) - Delcambre
- In the Service of the Tsar (1936) - L'amiral
- L'homme du jour (1937) - Petit rôle (uncredited)
- Culprit (1937) - Edouard
- Marthe Richard (1937) - Le commandant Rémont
- Gribouille (1937) - L'avocat général
- Rail Pirates (1938) - Ulrich
- Le joueur (1938) - Le baron Vincent
- Adrienne Lecouvreur (1938) - Le régent
- Ultimatum (1938) - Legrain
- Hôtel du Nord (1938) - Le chirurgien
- Le Corsaire (1939)
- Night in December (1940) - James Arthur Morris
- Sarajevo (1940) - L'archiduc Frédéric
- La prière aux étoiles (1941)
- Promise to a Stranger (1942) - Chancellin
- Don't Shout It from the Rooftops (1943) - L'avocat général
- Vautrin (1943) - Camusot
- Cecile Is Dead (1944) - Le directeur de la P.J.
- Coup de tête (1944) - Pongibaud
- La Vie de bohème (1945) - (uncredited)
- Alone in the Night (1945) - Planquine
- A Friend Will Come Tonight (1946) - Le docteur Lestrade
- Beauty and the Beast (1946) - Belle's father
- Martin Roumagnac (1946) - Le juge d'instruction (uncredited)
- Counter Investigation (1947) - Le juge d'instruction Nicolas Fournier
- Eternal Conflict (1948) - Le proviseur
- Les Parents terribles (1948) - Georges
- Blonde (1950) - L'inspecteur Paulot
- Dirty Hands (1951) - Karski
- Gangsterpremiere (1951) - Alois
- They Were Five (1952) - Le commissaire
- Great Man (1951) - Le docteur Charles Tannard
- La Vérité sur Bébé Donge (1952) - Le juge d'instruction
- Leathernose (1952) - Josias
- The Case Against X (1952) - Le médecin légiste
- My Priest Among the Rich (1952) - Sableuse
- Endless Horizons (1953) - Dusmesnil
- Thérèse Raquin (1953) - Michaud
- Les Intrigantes (1954) - Inspecteur Gosset
- L'homme aux clefs d'or (1956) - M. Bardot, le directeur du collège
- Les Lavandières du Portugal (1957) - Monsieur Dubois - le directeur de l'agence O.P.I.
- Different from You and Me (1957) - Travestiekünstler
- Le huitième jour (1960) - Le père de Françoise

== Bibliography ==
- Goble, Alan. The Complete Index to Literary Sources in Film. Walter de Gruyter, 1999.
