= Caprices (film) =

- Theatrical poster
- Directed by: Léo Joannon
- Written by: Léo Joannon; André Cayatte (dialogue); Jacques Companéez (uncredited)
- Starring: Danielle Darrieux; Albert Préjean
- Cinematography: Jules Kruger
- Music by: Georges Van Parys
- Production company: Continental Films
- Distributed by: A.C.E.
- Release dates: 16 February 1942 (Paris); 7 August 1942 (Nazi Germany)
- Running time: 80 min
- Country: France
- Language: French

Caprices is a 1942 French comedy film starring Danielle Darrieux and Albert Préjean, and was directed by Léo Joannon, who co-wrote screenplay with André Cayatte and Jacques Companéez for the German run film company Continental Films who made films to take the place of banned American films. It was released on VHS by TF1 Vidéo in France on 1 January 1998.

== Plot ==
It tells the story of two young rich people. Famous actress poses as a poor florist, and a distinguished society man camouflages himself as forger and swindler. This game leads them to make close relations in a series of adventures. Finally, the truth is revealed, and the couple return to normalcy but promise not to separate any more.

== Cast ==
- Danielle Darrieux as Lise
- Albert Préjean as Philippe
- Jean Parédès as Constant
- Fred Pasquali as the film director
- Germaine Reuver as the mother
- Jean Brochard as the father
