= Boîte à vendre =

- Directed by: Claude André Lalande
- Written by: Jean Broussolle; Robert Rocca
- Produced by: Fortuna Films
- Starring: Jeannette Allouin; Louis de Funès
- Release date: 1951
- Running time: 20 minutes
- Country: France
- Language: French

Boîte à vendre, is a French comedy film from 1951, directed by Claude André Lalande, written by Jean Broussolle, starring Jeannette Allouin and Louis de Funès.

== Cast ==
- Jeannette Allouin
- Irène Hilda : A singer
- Simone Alma : A singer
- Maurice Schutz
- René Berthier
- Raoul et son chien
- Paul Demange
- Louis de Funès : rôle (?)
- Bob Ingarao
- Colette Deréal
- Richard Marsan
- Francis Boyer
- Delcassant
