= Patrick Préjean =

French actor (born 1944)

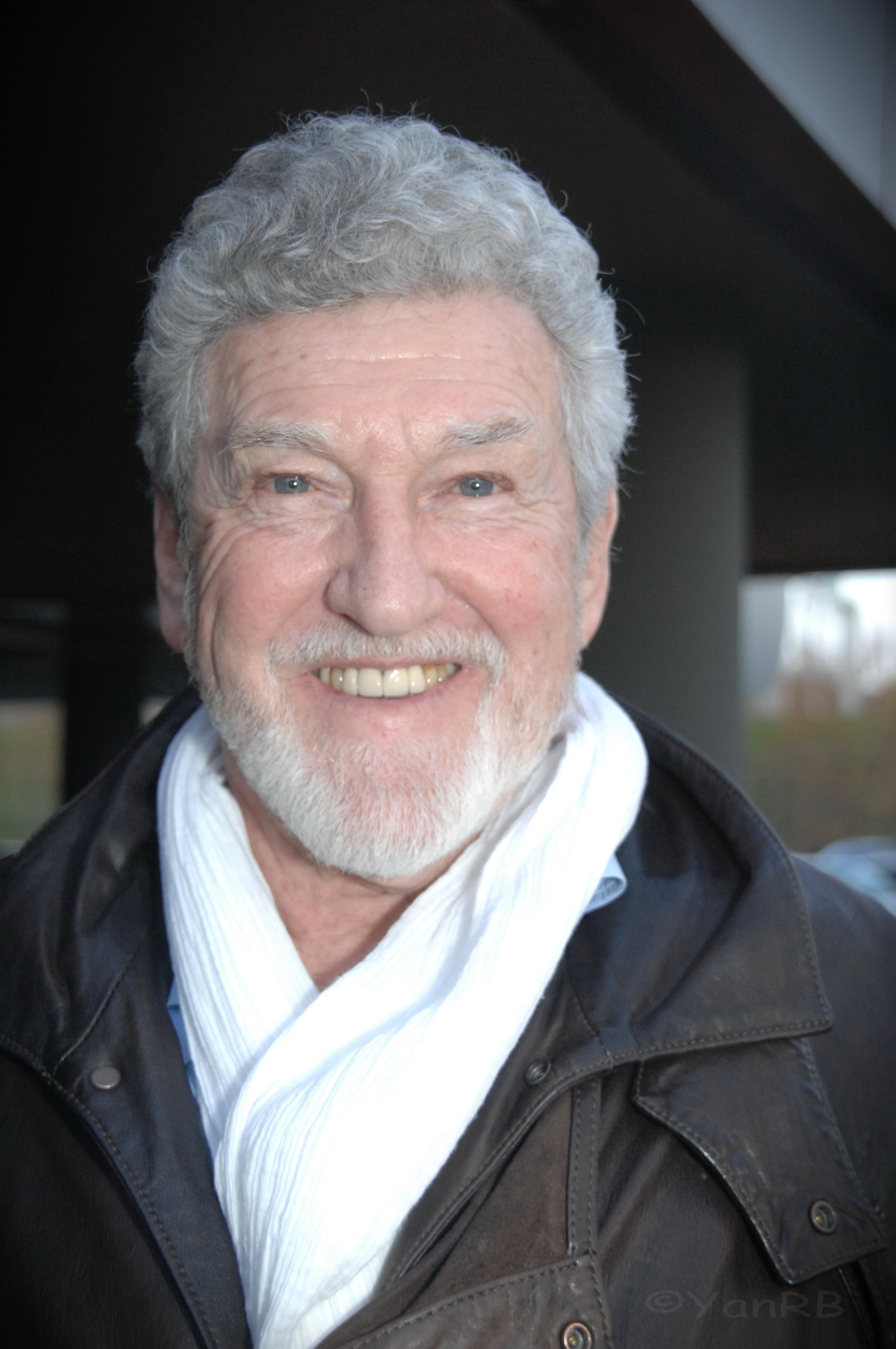
- Born: 4 June 1944 (age 81); Saint-Maur-des-Fossés, France
- Occupation: Actor

Patrick Préjean (born 4 June 1944) is a French actor, known especially for his work in dubbing. He has also made a career in boulevard theatre. He is the son of the actor Albert Préjean and the actress Lysiane Rey, and is the father of actress Laura Préjean.

Préjean is best known for dubbing Looney Tunes characters like Yosemite Sam and Sylvester the Cat, Hamm in the Toy Story franchise, Gorgious in Space Goofs, Tigger in Welcome to Pooh Corner, P. Sherman in Finding Nemo, the Narrator in Noddy, The Blue Aardwark in Pink Panther and Pals and Grandpa Shark in Baby Shark's Big Show!.

== Filmography ==
=== Films ===
Films
Year	Title	Role	Notes
1964	Requiem pour un caïd	Worker Employee	
1965	Les Mordus de Paris	?	
1966	Brigade antigangs	Beau Môme	
1966	Shock Troops	Lecocq	
1967	Les Cracks	Lucien Médard	
1968	Le tatoué	?	
1968	Ho!	Journal Employee	
1968	Once Upon a Time in the West	Wobbles	French dub
1969	The Brain	Belgian Sergeant	
1969	Clérambard	Buzard	
1969	Un merveilleux parfum d'oseille	Hervé	
1970	Atlantic Wall	Allie Officer	
1970	Donkey Skin	Allard	
1970	The Married Couple of the Year Two	Saint-Aubin	
1971	The Legend of Frenchie King	Luke	
1972	Dr. Popaul	?	
1973	Ursule et Grelu	Strangler	
1973	Juliette and Juliette	Taxi Customer	
1973	Par ici la monnaie	Othello	
1973	Nuits Rouges	Séraphin Beauminon	
1974	Soldat Duroc, ça va être ta fête	Sergeant	
1975	Le Bougnoul	Journalist	
1975	Opération Lady Marlène	Louis	
1976	À l'Est du Rio Concho	Patrick	
1976	Sexuela	Innocent man	
1977	Drôles de zèbres	Jean	
1978	Je vous ferai aimer la vie	Phillip	
1978	The Deer Hunter	Stan	French dub
1979	Un jour, un tueur	?	
1980	The Wonderful Day	Octave	
1980	Signé Furax	Worker / Music Guy	
1982	Le gendarme et les gendarmettes	Logis Perlin Maréchal	
1983	Adieu foulards	Viktor	
1984	The Terminator	Matt Buchanan	French dub
1984	Supergirl	Nigel	French dub
1986	Friday the 13th Part VI: Jason Lives	Pappas	French dub
1990	My Mother's Castle	Dominique	
1995	Toy Story	Hamm	French dub, first film of the franchise
1996	Space Jam	Sylvester the Cat / Yosemite Sam	French dub
1996	101 Dalmatians	Horace	French dub
1999	Toy Story 2	Hamm	French dub, second film of the franchise
1999	My Neighbors the Yamadas	?	French dub
2000	Petite Chérie	Father	
2000	The Tigger Movie	Tigger	French dub
2000	Chicken Run	Mr. Tweedy	French dub
2001	Buzz Lightyear of Star Command: The Adventure Begins	Hamm	French dub
2003	Finding Nemo	P. Sherman	French dub
2003	Looney Tunes: Back in Action	Sylvester the Cat / Yosemite Sam	French dub
2004	Winnie the Pooh: Springtime with Roo	Tigger	French dub
2010	Toy Story 3	Hamm	French dub, third film of the franchise
2011	Winnie the Pooh	Tigger	French dub
2012	Crimes en sourdine	Professor Chouara	
2013	Despicable Me 2	Italian Guy	French dub
2016	L'Invitation	Raphäel's Father	
2017	Marie-Francine	?	
2018	J'ai perdu Albert	Father	
2018	La Légende	President Morel	
2018	One Nation, One King	Henri IV	
2019	Toy Story 4	Hamm	French dub, fourth film of the franchise
2021	Space Jam: A New Legacy	Sylvester the Cat / Yosemite Sam	French dub, second film
2022	King Tweety	Sylvester the Cat	French dub

=== Television ===
Series / Animated series
Year	Title	Role	Notes
1988–1993	Count Duckula	Duckula	French dub
1989–1997	Roseanne	Dan Conner	French dub, 211 episodes
1989–present	The Simpsons	Homer	French dub
1995	Mumfie	Narrator	French dub
1996–2001	3rd Rock from the Sun	Dick Solomon	French dub
1997–2006	Space Goofs	Gorgious	
1999–2004	Famille Pirate	Victor MacBernik	
2000–2002	Noddy	Narrator	French dub
2000–2006	Norman Normal	Irwin Stone	
2005–present	Pocoyo	Narrator	French dub
2005–present	Robot Chicken	Swiper	French dub
2008–2012	Merlin	Gaiüs	French dub
2009	Breaking Bad	Dr Victor Bravenec	French dub, two episodes
2009–2016	Noddy in Toyland	Narrator	French dub
2009–2018	Une famille formidable	René	
2009, 2014	Josephine, Guardian Angel	Giraud / Gilles	Two episodes
2009–2020	Modern Family	Frank Dunphy	French dub, 13 episodes
2010	Pink Panther and Pals	The Black Aardwark	French dub
2011–2014	The Looney Tunes Show	Sylvester the Cat / Yosemite Sam	French dub
2014–2017	The Mindy Project	Dr William Ledreau	French dub, 9 episodes
2015	The Big Bang Theory	Dan / Boss	French dub, two episodes
2015–2020	New Looney Tunes	Sylvester the Cat / Yosemite Sam	French dub
2016–2020	Noddy, Toyland Detective	Narrator	French dub
2017–2024	Curb Your Enthusiasm	Larry David	French dub, second voice
2020–2023	Looney Tunes Cartoons	Sylvester the Cat / Yosemite Sam	French dub
2021–2025	Baby Shark's Big Show!	Grandpa Shark	French dub
2022	The Cuphead Show!	?	French dub
