= Henri Lepage (director) =

French film director, screenwriter and assistant director

- Born: 12 February 1898; 10th arrondissement of Paris
- Died: 31 January 1970 (aged 71); Clichy, Hauts-de-Seine
- Occupation(s): Film director, screenwriter

Henri Lepage (12 February 1898 – 31 January 1970) was a French film director, screenwriter, and assistant director

== Filmography ==
=== Codirector ===
- 1924 : La Machine à refaire la vie, codirector Julien Duvivier (silent version)
- 1929 : Figaro by Gaston Ravel
- 1932 : Fun in the Barracks, codirector Maurice Tourneur
- 1933 : La Machine à refaire la vie, codirector Julien Duvivier (sound version)
- 1945 : Marie la Misère, assistant-director Jacques de Baroncelli
- 1947 : Monsieur Badin by Georges Régnier
- 1947 : Bichon by René Jayet
- 1949 : Nous avons tous fait la même chose by René Sti
- 1951 : Fortuné de Marseille, codirector Pierre Méré

=== Director ===
- 1925 : Une Aventure de la rue
- 1942 : Le Cinématographe Lumière (short film, documentary)
- 1949 : Extravagant Theodora
- 1950 : Mon ami le cambrioleur
- 1951 : Les Maîtres nageurs
- 1951 : Et ta sœur
- 1951 : Sins of Madeleine
- 1952 : Naked in the Wind
- 1953 : Sins of Paris
- 1954 : Le Collège en folie
- 1954 : Pas de souris dans le bizness
- 1955 : Pas de pitié pour les caves
- 1955 : In the Manner of Sherlock Holmes
- 1956 : C'est une fille de Paname
- 1957 : Pas de grisbi pour Ricardo
- 1957 : Le Souffle du désir

=== Screenwriter ===
- 1951 : Les Maîtres nageurs
- 1952 : Dupont Barbès
- 1952 : Fortuné de Marseille
- 1953 : L'Île aux femmes nues
- 1956 : À la manière de Sherlock Holmes
