= Henri-Georges Clouzot filmography =

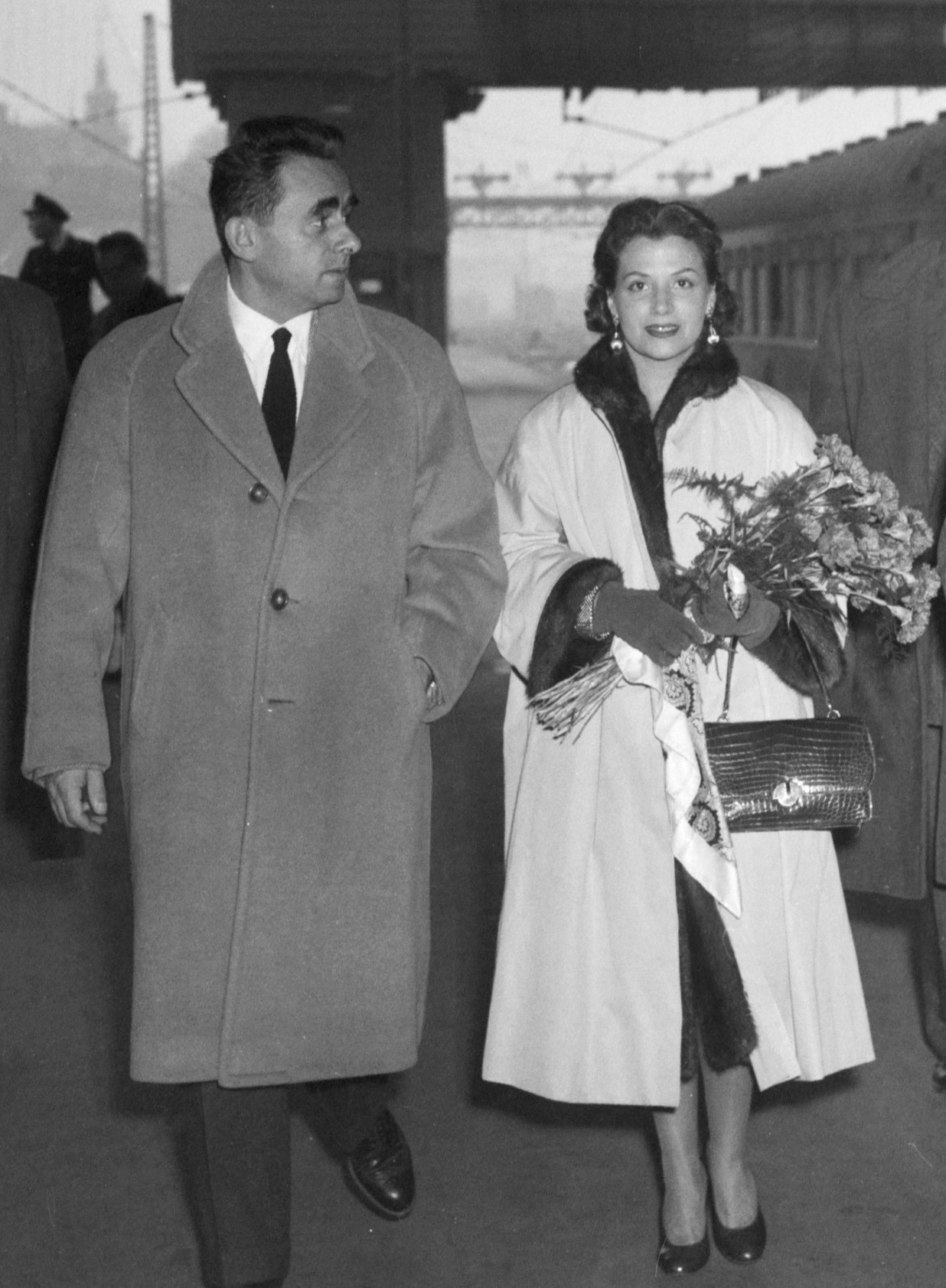
Henri-Georges Clouzot with his wife Véra Clouzot in 1953

Henri-Georges Clouzot was a French film director, writer and producer. He contributed to many projects as either the writer, director, producer, or a combination of the three.

His first feature film was Tout pour l'amour (1933) and as a sole director the first was the 1942 mystery The Murderer Lives at Number 21 (French: L'Assassin Habite au 21), which featured Clouzot as both screenwriter and director. After the release of The Raven (French: Le Corbeau), Clouzot found himself barred from making movies until 1947. Clouzot was later embraced by international critics and audiences following the release of The Wages of Fear (French: Le Salaire de la Peur) and Diabolique (French: Les Diaboliques).

Clouzot's declining health interfered with his later work and made it necessary to abandon his production of L'Enfer. He released his final film La Prisonnière in 1966. L'Enfer's script was filmed by Claude Chabrol in 1994.

== Films ==
Year	Film	Original title	Credited as		
Year	Film	Original title	Director	Screenwriter	Producer
1931	I'll Be Alone After Midnight	Je serai seule après minuit		Yes	
1931	Fear in the Batignolles (short film)	La terreur des batignolles	Yes		
1931	The Unknown Singer	Le chanteur inconnu		Yes	
1931	My Cousin from Warsaw	Ma cousine de Varsovie		Yes	
1931	Dragnet Night	Un soir de rafle		Yes	
1932	Should We Wed Them?	Faut-il les marier?		Yes	
1932	One Night's Song	La chanson d'une nuit		Yes	
1932	The Last Blow	Le dernier choc		Yes	
1932	King of the Hotel	Le roi des palaces		Yes	
1933	The Princess's Whim	Caprice de princesse	Yes (co-director)	Yes	
1933	Dream Castle	Château de rêve		Yes	
1933	—	Tout pour l'amour	Yes (co-director)	Yes	
1935	—	Itto		Yes	
1938	Bargekeeper's Daughter	Éducation de prince		Yes	
1938	The Rebel	Le révolté		Yes	
1939	The Duel	Le duel		Yes	
1939	The World Will Tremble	Le monde tremblera		Yes	
1941	The Last of the Six	Le dernier des six		Yes	
1942	Strangers in the House	Les inconnus dans la maison		Yes	
1942	The Murderer Lives at Number 21	L'Assassin habite au 21	Yes	Yes	
1943	The Raven	Le corbeau	Yes	Yes	
1947	Quay of the Goldsmiths	Quai des orfèvres	Yes	Yes	
1949	Manon	Manon	Yes	Yes	
1949	Return to Life	Retour à la vie (aka Le Retour de Jean)	Yes (segment director only)		
1950	Miquette	Miquette et sa mère	Yes	Yes	
1953	The Wages of Fear	Le salaire de la peur	Yes	Yes	Yes
1955	Diabolique	Les diaboliques	Yes	Yes	Yes
1956	The Mystery of Picasso	Le mystère picasso	Yes	Yes	Yes
1956	If All the Guys in the World	Si tous les gars du monde		Yes	
1957	The Spies	Les espions	Yes	Yes	Yes
1960	The Truth	La vérité	Yes	Yes	
1966	Herbert von Karajan in Rehearsal and Performance		Yes		
1967	Giuseppe Verdi: Requiem International	Messa da requiem von giuseppe verdi	Yes		
1968	Woman in Chains	La Prisonnière (film)	Yes	Yes	
1994	Hell	L'Enfer		Yes	
