= Pierre Froidebise =

Belgian organist, composer and musicologist

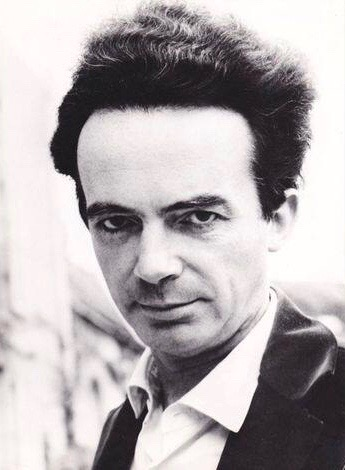

Pierre Froidebise (15 May 1914 – 28 October 1962) was a Belgian organist, composer, and musicologist.

== Life ==
Froidebise was born in the rural Condroz village of Ohey, province of Namur, the son of a well-off retail pharmacist. After completing his secondary education, he began studying the organ, first at the Namur Conservatory with René Barbier and then with Paul de Maleingreau at the Brussels Conservatory, where he also studied composition with Raymond Moulaert and fugue with Léon Jongen. He took the first prize for organ in 1939, and in 1941 won the Agniez Prize for composition.

He subsequently studied composition with Paul Gilson and Jean Absil, before moving to Paris to further his organ studies with Charles Tournemire. In 1942 he became organist at the church of Saint-Jacques in Liège, where later he performed and was choirmaster at the Grand Séminaire and taught harmony at the Conservatory, where he was appointed professor in 1947.

In the meantime, he won the Belgian second Prix de Rome in 1943 for his cantata La navigation d’Ulysse.

As a teacher, his notable students include Célestin Deliège, Nicolas Ruwet, and Henri Pousseur. Froidebise died in Liège on 28 October 1962.

== Compositional style ==
Froidebise's earliest organ compositions show the influence of César Franck, but his enthusiasm soon turned to Igor Stravinsky for his model. His Trois poèmes japonais for voice and orchestra, Op. 1, No. 1 (1942), while exhibiting traits of his teacher Absil, in its overall feeling recalls Stravinsky's Three Japanese Lyrics, and the Russian master's presence is even clearer in the Cinq comptines for voice and eleven instruments, Op. 1, No. 2 (1947), which was performed at the 1950 ISCM Festival. His discovery of the music of Anton Webern led to a decisive turn to serialism beginning in 1948, with the cantata Amercœur—a rather severe work setting Liège place names in an economical twelve-tone technique.

From this point onward, Froidebise was a confirmed dodecaphonist and maintained regular contact with Olivier Messiaen, René Leibowitz, and Pierre Boulez in Paris. His finest work, Stèle pour Sei Shonagon (1958), for soprano and four instrumental groups, added aleatory elements to a warmer use of twelve-tone technique than that found in Amercœur, combined with a supple rhythmic treatment.

== Compositions ==
=== Dramatic ===
- Radio operas:
  - La bergère et le ramoneur (1954)
  - La lune amère (1956)
- Ballets:
  - Le bal chez le voisin, orchestra (1954)
  - L’aube
- Incidental music:
  - Antigone (Sophocles, 1936)
  - Oedipe roi (Sophocles, ?1946)
  - Ce vieil Oedipe (A. Curvers, ?1946)
  - Elkerlyc (1949)
  - Jan van Nude (M. Lambilliotte, 1951)
  - Les choéphores (Aeschylus, 1954)
  - Hippolyte (Euripides)
  - La maison à deux portes (Calderón)
  - Une ville chantait (J. de Coune)
  - Le p’tit bateau de la réunion (J.M. Landier)
- Film scores:
  - Visite à Picasso (Paul Haesaerts, 1951), collab. André Souris
  - Lumière des hommes (Bernhart, 1954)

=== Orchestral ===
- De l’aube à la nuit (1934–37)
- La légende de St Julien l’Hospitalier (1941)

=== Vocal ===
- Notre père (?1934)
- La lumière endormie, cantata (1941)
- Trois poèmes japonais, Op. 1, No. 1, soprano or tenor and orchestra (1942)
- Trois poèmes japonais, for middle voice and piano (1942)
- La navigation d’Ulysse, cantata, 1943
- Cinq comptines, Op. 1, No. 2, soprano or tenor and 11 instruments, (1947)
- Amercœur, Op. 1, No. 3, soprano, wind quintet, and piano (1948)
- La cloche engloutie, cantata (1956)
- Stèle pour Sei Shonagon, Op. 1, No. 4, soprano and chamber orchestra (19 instruments), 1958
- Ne recorderis
- Poème chinois, soprano or tenor and piano
- Choral motets:
  - "Justorum animae"
  - "Laudate Dominum"
  - "Puer natus est"

=== Chamber music ===
- Sonata, violin and piano (1938)
- Petite suite monodique, flute or clarinet
- Petite suite, wind quintet
- Dom Japhet d'Arménie, 2 clarinets, 2 bassoons, 2 horns, 2 trumpets, 2 trombones, harpsichord, 3 timpani, and percussion (1956)

=== Keyboard ===
- Piano:
  - Sept croquis brefs (1934)
  - La légende de St Julien l’Hospitalier (1940; orch. 1941)
  - Hommage à Chopin (1947)
  - Livre de ricercare
- Organ:
  - Trois pièces (1933)
  - Suite brève (1934)
  - Diptyque (1936)
  - Prelude and Fugue (1936)
  - Sonatina (1939)
  - Prelude and Fughetta
  - Livre de noëls belges
  - Hommage à J.S. Bach
