= La Main du diable =

1943 film directed by Maurice Tourneur

- Directed by: Maurice Tourneur
- Written by: Jean-Paul Le Chanois
- Based on: La Main du diable 1927 novel by Gérard de Nerval
- Produced by: Maurice Tourneur; Alfred Greven (uncredited)
- Starring: Pierre Fresnay
- Cinematography: Armand Thirard
- Edited by: Christian Gaudin (uncredited)
- Music by: Roger Dumas
- Production company: Continental Films
- Distributed by: Films Sonores Tobis (France); Inter-State Films Ltd. (UK); Distinguished Films (US)
- Release date: April 21, 1943 (France)
- Running time: 78–83 minutes
- Country: France
- Language: French

La Main du diable ("The Devil's Hand"), also known as Carnival of Sinners, is a 1943 French horror film directed by Maurice Tourneur and starring Pierre Fresnay as a struggling artist who acquires a supernatural talisman. Eventually, however, there is a price to be paid.

== Plot ==
The guests at an isolated hotel cut off by an avalanche are surprised when Roland Brissot, a man missing his left hand, shows up, carrying only a small casket. He asks the innkeeper if there is a cemetery adjoining the ruins of a nearby abbey and is disappointed when the answer is no. Then two shots ring out. The police arrive, looking for a little man carrying a coffin. The news frightens Brissot. While he is called to the telephone, his casket is stolen during a temporary blackout. Disconsolate, he gives in to the curiosity of the other guests and tells his story. A flashback ensues.

Brissot is a struggling, untalented painter in Paris. He persuades Irène, an attractive glove shop saleswoman, to pose for him. One night, frustrated with his lack of drive, she breaks up with him at a cafe. Mélisse, the chef, comes over and offers him a solution for all his woes: a talisman that will give him everything he wants, for the price of one sou (penny). Ange (Angel) warns him not to buy it, and the chef reveals that he must sell it at a loss before he dies or he will be condemned to Hell forever. The talisman turns out to be a severed left hand, which amazingly obeys the chef's commands. Despite all this, Brissot does not believe the supernatural aspects and buys it. As soon as the bargain is concluded, the chef loses his left hand.

The talisman works. Exactly one year later, Brissot has a wildly successful exhibition at Galerie Gabelin and is married to Irène. For some reason he himself does not understand, he paints with his left hand only and signs his works "Maximus Leo". At the exhibition, he spots a little man he has seen before. He chases after him, but then notices in a florist shop window a wreath with the sash that says "In Memoriam Maximus Leo". Inside, he learns that a little man ordered it. Later the little man comes to his office and admits Brissot has "the Devil to pay". Even though Brissot cannot sell the hand at a loss, the little man offers to buy it back for a sou. Brissot accepts, but then takes it back after Irène is cold to him. The little man tells him that his offer still holds, but the price doubles every day. Brissot dithers until the 23rd day, but when he tries to pay the current price, he does not have quite enough money. Later, Irène telephones, telling him she has the money he needs, but is murdered before he can get to her. Ange tells him to try a roulette system at the casino in Monte Carlo, but the little man shows up, and his lucky streak ends just before he can win the sum he needs.

When he returns to his hotel, he is met by all the previous owners of the hand: a royal musketeer, a cutpurse, a juggler, an illusionist, a surgeon, his assistant (who became a boxer), and finally the chef. They tell him their tales. The little man appears, followed by the man to whom the hand belongs. Maximus Leo was born in 1422. His hand was supremely gifted, but he chose to become a monk. The little man was only able to obtain the hand by stealing it from the monk's tomb. Therefore, as Maximus Leo states, all the bargains are invalid, since the little man cannot sell what does not rightfully belong to him. After the defeated little man leaves, Maximus Leo asks Brissot to return the hand to his tomb.

Returning to the present, Brissot spots the little man outside and gives chase. They fight atop the ruins of the abbey, and Brissot is sent tumbling to his death. He lands on top of a tomb. The casket is found empty nearby, and the tomb's inscription reads "Maximus Leo".

== Cast ==
- Pierre Fresnay as Roland Brissot
- Josseline Gaël as Irène
- Noël Roquevert as Mélisse
- Guillaume de Sax as Gibelin
- Palau as Le petit homme (The little man)
- Pierre Larquey as Ange (Angel)
- Gabriello as Le dîneur (The diner)
- Antoine Balpêtré as Denis
- Marcelle Rexiane as Madame Denis (as Rexiane)
- André Varennes as Le colonel
- Georges Chamarat as Duval
- Jean Davy as Le mousquetaire (The musketeer)
- Jean Despeaux as Le boxeur (The boxer)

== Reception ==
Bosley Crowther, reviewer for The New York Times, was not favorably impressed. He called it a "weird diversion. It succeeds in part and for a while but not enough."

== See also ==
- "The Bottle Imp", a Robert Louis Stevenson short story with a similar plot
