= André Gabriello =

French actor (1896–1975)

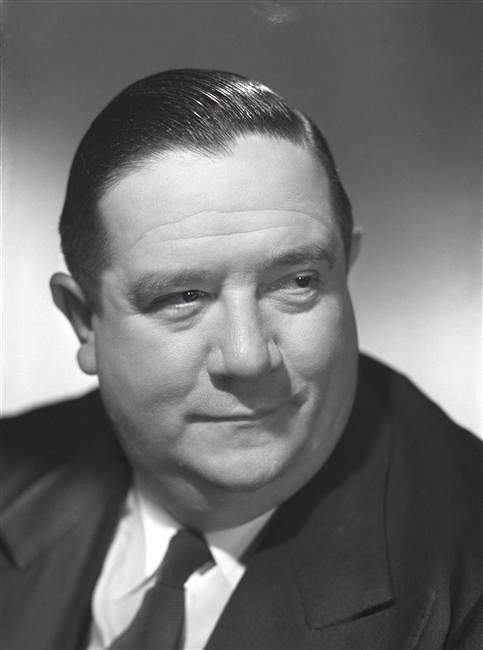
- Born: 15 October 1896; Paris, Île-de-France, France
- Died: 19 March 1975 (aged 78); Paris, Île-de-France, France
- Other name: André Adrien Marie Galope
- Occupation: Actor
- Years active: 1931–1966 (film)

André Gabriello (1896–1975) was a French film actor. A character actor known for his supporting roles, notable appearances included Jean Renoir's Partie de campagne (1936) and Maurice Tourneur's Cecile Is Dead (1944). He was the father of the actress Suzanne Gabriello.

== Selected filmography ==
- Calais-Dover (1931)
- My Heart Is Calling You (1934)
- Divine (1935)
- Partie de campagne (1936)
- Yoshiwara (1937)
- Rasputin (1938)
- The Lafarge Case (1938)
- Sirocco (1938)
- There's No Tomorrow (1939)
- Narcisse (1940)
- The Murderer Lives at Number 21 (1942)
- Twisted Mistress (1942)
- No Love Allowed (1942)
- Love Marriage (1942)
- La Main du diable (1943)
- Picpus (1943)
- Adrien (1943)
- Cecile Is Dead (1944)
- Majestic Hotel Cellars (1945)
- The Revenge of Roger (1946)
- Roger la Honte (1946)
- The Woman in Red (1947)
- The Murdered Model (1948)
- Night Round (1949)
- Branquignol (1949)
- Millionaires for One Day (1949)
- Scandal on the Champs-Élysées (1949)
- Two Loves (1949)
- Street Without a King (1950)
- Without Trumpet or Drum (1950)
- The Patron (1950)
- My Wife Is Formidable (1951)
- Moumou (1951)
- Sweet Madness (1951)
- The Darling of His Concierge (1951)
- Grand Gala (1952)
- Women Are Angels (1952)
- The Drunkard (1953)
- The Fighting Drummer (1953)
- Faites-moi confiance (1954)
- Leguignon the Healer (1954)
- It's All Adam's Fault (1958)
- The Girls of La Rochelle (1962)
- The Duke's Gold (1965)
- Your Money or Your Life (1966)

== Bibliography ==
- Merigeau, Pascal . Jean Renoir: A Biography. Hachette, 2017.
- Waldman, Harry. Maurice Tourneur: The Life and Films. McFarland, 2001.
