= No Love Allowed (film) =

1942 film

- Directed by: Richard Pottier
- Written by: Jean Aurenche; Michel Duran; Pierre Soulaine; René Pujol; Albert Willemetz
- Based on: Yes by René Pujol and Albert Willemetz
- Produced by: Alfred Greven
- Starring: Suzy Delair; Paul Meurisse; Mona Goya
- Cinematography: Walter Wottitz
- Edited by: Gérard Bensdorp
- Music by: Maurice Yvain
- Production company: Continental Films
- Distributed by: L'Alliance Cinématographique Européenne
- Release date: 30 October 1942
- Running time: 90 minutes
- Country: France
- Language: French

No Love Allowed (French: Défense d'aimer) is a 1942 French comedy film directed by Richard Pottier and starring Suzy Delair, Paul Meurisse and Mona Goya. It was based on the libretto of the operetta Yes by René Pujol and Albert Willemetz. It was shot at the Neuilly Studios in Paris by the German-backed Continental Films. The film's sets were designed by the art director Guy de Gastyne.

== Cast ==
- Suzy Delair as Totte - une manucure
- Paul Meurisse as Maxime Gavard
- André Gabriello as Gavard
- Mona Goya as Lucette de Saint-Églefin
- Guillaume de Sax as Horace de Saint-Églefin
- Josée Bisbal as Marquita
- Louis Salou as Loysel
- Jean Rigaux as Roger
- Lucien Bryonne as Un vendeur
- Jacqueline Chanal as La dactylo
- Marguerite de Morlaye as La dame dans l'ascenseur
- François Dupriet as L'agent
- Max Elloy as Le voyageur affamé
- Pierre Sarda as Le croupier-marieur
- Louis Seigner as Le directeur de l'hôtel
- Henri Vilbert as Le vendeur de la roulotte
- Geneviève Morel as La femme de chambre

== Bibliography ==
- Goble, Alan. The Complete Index to Literary Sources in Film. Walter de Gruyter, 1999.
- Leahy, Sarah & Vanderschelden, Isabelle. Screenwriters in French cinema. Manchester University Press, 2021.
- Leteux, Christine. Continental Films: French Cinema under German Control. University of Wisconsin Press, 2022.
- Rège, Philippe. Encyclopedia of French Film Directors, Volume 1. Scarecrow Press, 2009.
- Siclier, Jacques. La France de Pétain et son cinéma. H. Veyrier, 1981.
