= Adrien (1943 film) =

- Film poster
- Directed by: Fernandel
- Written by: Jean Aurenche; Jean de Létraz (play)
- Produced by: Alfred Greven
- Starring: Fernandel; Paulette Dubost; Jean Tissier; Jane Marken
- Cinematography: Armand Thirard
- Edited by: Christian Gaudin
- Music by: Roger Dumas
- Production company: Continental Films
- Distributed by: L'Alliance Cinématographique Européenne
- Release date: 1943
- Running time: 80 minutes
- Country: France
- Language: French

Adrien is a French comedy film, released in 1943. Directed by Fernandel, the film stars Fernandel as Adrien Moulinet, a modest and unassuming bank clerk who invents a motorized rollerskate but needs the help of advertising agent Jules Petipas (Paul Azaïs) to help market it.

The film's cast also includes Paulette Dubost, Huguette Vivier, Dorette Ardenne, Jean Tissier, Jane Marken, Roger Duchesne and Georges Chamarat.

== Synopsis ==
Adrien Moulinet, a collector at Nortier Bank, is the inventor of a motorized rollerskate, which he wants to market. He meets Jules, an unemployed journalist, who is going to help him with this, but, after being attacked and wounded by gangsters, Adrian is sent by his boss to recover in a spa. There, he incidentally meets the two daughters of the banker, - as well as the mistress of the husband of one of the two girls, - and soon, a sentimental and dramatic imbroglio begins to grow around the poor employee.
