= Quai des Orfèvres =

- French film poster
- Directed by: Henri-Georges Clouzot
- Screenplay by: Henri-Georges Clouzot; Jean Ferry
- Based on: Légitime défense 1942 book by Stanislas-André Steeman
- Produced by: Roger de Venloo
- Starring: Louis Jouvet; Simone Renant; Bernard Blier; Suzy Delair
- Cinematography: Armand Thirard
- Edited by: Charles Bretoneiche
- Music by: Francis Lopez
- Production company: Majestic Films
- Distributed by: Les Films Corona
- Release date: 3 October 1947 (France)
- Running time: 106 minutes
- Country: France
- Language: French

Quai des Orfèvres (French: [ke dez‿ɔʁfɛvʁ]; "Goldsmiths' Quay"; also known as Jenny Lamour) is a 1947 French police procedural drama film based on the book Légitime défense by Stanislas-Andre Steeman. Directed by Henri-Georges Clouzot the film stars Louis Jouvet as Inspector Antoine, with Simone Renant as Dora Monnier, Bernard Blier as Maurice Martineau and Suzy Delair as Jenny Lamour. The film's title refers to the Paris headquarters of the police criminal investigation division, the Judicial Police headquarters, located at 36 quai des Orfèvres and the setting for much of the latter half of the film.

The film was Clouzot's third directorial effort, and the first after the controversy of Le corbeau. Without having the novel on hand, Clouzot and Jean Ferry based the film on memory and deviated significantly from the original story. The film was released in France and was popular with both audiences and critics. On the film's re-release in the United States in 2002, it continued to receive praise from critics as one of the director's best films.

== Plot ==
Paris, December 1946. Jenny Lamour (Delair) wants to succeed in the theatre. Her husband and accompanist is Maurice Martineau (Blier), a mild-mannered but jealous man. When he finds out that Jenny has been making eyes at Brignon, a lecherous old businessman, in order to further her career, he loses his temper and threatens Brignon with death. Despite this, Jenny goes to a secret rendezvous at Brignon's apartment. He is murdered the same evening. The criminal investigations are led by Inspector Antoine (Jouvet).

== Production ==
Quai des Orfèvres was directed by Henri-Georges Clouzot and was his first film in four years. Clouzot had been banned from film making after the controversy after the release Le corbeau and due to Clouzot's collaboration with the German-owned company Continental Films. During Clouzot's inactivity, he wrote scripts for films that were never released. He met with producer Anatole Eliacheff who offered to financially back Clouzot's next film provided that it would be a commercial film. Clouzot suggested the Belgian murder mystery Légitime défense (English: Self-Defense) by Stanislas-André Steeman which he had read during the Occupation. This production was meant to be a commission to end Clouzot's four years of enforced inactivity and take advantage of the new popular style of crime literature. Clouzot had previously written screenplays based on Steeman's work including Georges Lacombe's Le Dernier des six (1943) and his own debut, L'Assassin habite au 21 (1942). Eliacheff agreed and shortly after sold the rights to another producer, Roger de Venloo.

When trying to find a copy of Légitime défense to re-read, Clouzot found that it was out of print. Clouzot wrote a letter to Steeman to obtain a copy and began to adapt the story from memory with writer Jean Ferry. By the time a copy of the book arrived, Clouzot and Ferry had already written the script which deviated greatly from Steeman's novel. The changes in the script include the identity of the real murderer, the settings of the action, and the introduction of the lesbian photographer character Dora Monier.

Quai des Orfèvres was also a comeback film for director-actor Louis Jouvet with whom Clouzot had become good friends before World War II. Jouvet accepted the part of Inspector Antoine on the condition that a flexible shooting schedule would be allowed and that Clouzot would cast some of Jouvet's troupe members in the film. Clouzot agreed and cast Leo Lapara as one of Antoine's colleagues and Fernand René as the music hall director. Clouzot cast Charles Dullin as Brignon, the murder victim. It would be the last film appearance for Dullin, who died in 1949. The main female lead was written for Suzy Delair who was Clouzot's romantic partner at the time of filming. The film went into production on 3 February 1947 and finished filming on 10 May.

== Cast ==
- Louis Jouvet as Inspector Antoine
- Simone Renant as Dora Monnier
- Bernard Blier as Maurice Martineau
- Suzy Delair as Marguerite Chauffournier, alias Jenny Lamour
- Pierre Larquey as Emile Lafour
- Jeanne Fusier-Gir as Pâquerette
- Claudine Dupuis as Manon
- Charles Dullin as Brignon
- Henri Arius as Léopardi
- Jacques Grétillat as August
- Robert Dalban as Paulo
- Yvonne Ménard as dancer

== Release and reception ==
Quai des Orfèvres was released on 3 October 1947 in Paris. In 1947, it was the fourth most popular film in France, drawing 5.5 million spectators. The film has had several theatrical revivals in France since its original release. The film was released in New York City in March 1948 under the title Jenny Lamour. Quai des Orfèvres was re-released for a limited run within America on 25 October 2002.

=== Critical reception ===
The film received positive reception from critics on its initial release in France. Pierre Chartier of France-Libre wrote that the film was "a watershed in the history of the French crime film." Jean Desternes of Combat praised the director Clouzot, referring to him as "not just a film director. He's a creative artist who sticks to his initial idea, works it out in shots, words, actions." François Chalais wrote a positive review in Carrefour, stating the film "commands the keenest admiration at any given moment, the dialogue of the film is the work of a truly great and extremely subtle dramatist. That's one of M. Clouzot's most remarkable traits: he knows how to write." At the 1947 Venice International Film Festival, Clouzot won the International Prize for Best Director for the film. The film received positive critical reception in the United States on its initial release. Bosley Crowther of The New York Times referred to the film as "a fascinating and penetrating film". Richard L. Coe of The Washington Post referred to the film as "a fine, engrossing French crime film". Variety gave the film a positive review, proclaiming that "In every respect [Quai des Orfèvres] is outstanding." In 1949, the film won an Edgar Award for Best Foreign film.

Modern reception of the film has also been positive. French critics have continued to praise the film since its release. In 1964 Jean Mitry wrote that the film is "one of the few films—with Renoir's Rules of the Game, All About Eve, and two or three others—which allows us to think that the cinema, like the novel and the theater, can some day be an instrument for exploring the human soul." In 1986, Michel Perez wrote a review for Le Matin de Paris stating that Quai des Orfèvres "was nothing less than the most powerful, best constructed, best written, best directed and most telling film about society of its day." In 1995, a critics poll in the French film magazine Positif placed Quai des Orfèvres as the second greatest French thriller of all time. The film aggregator website Rotten Tomatoes reports a 100% approval rating, based on 32 reviews, with a weighted average of 8.8/10. The site's consensus reads: "Henri Georges-Clouzot's engrossing noir explores the troubles of post-war France and the line dividing social struggle and criminality". At Metacritic, which assigns a normalized rating out of 100 to reviews from mainstream critics, the film has received an average score of 89, based on 10 reviews.

=== Home media ===
Quai des Orfèvres was released in North America on DVD by The Criterion Collection on 27 May 2003. In the United Kingdom, a DVD was released on 30 April 2007 by Optimum Releasing. The Criterion DVD is now out of print. Kino Lorber has released a 4K restoration of the film with supplements on Blu-ray and DVD.
