= Majestic Hotel Cellars =

1945 film

- Directed by: Richard Pottier
- Screenplay by: Charles Spaak
- Based on: Maigret and the Hotel Majestic by Georges Simenon
- Produced by: Alfred Greven
- Starring: Albert Préjean; Suzy Prim; Denise Grey
- Cinematography: Pierre Montazel
- Edited by: Christian Gaudin
- Music by: René Sylviano
- Production company: Continental Films
- Distributed by: L'Alliance Cinématographique Européenne
- Release date: 11 August 1945
- Running time: 100 minutes
- Country: France
- Language: French

Majestic Hotel Cellars (French: Les caves du Majestic) is a 1945 French crime film directed by Richard Pottier and starring Albert Préjean, Suzy Prim and Denise Grey. It is based on the Maigret novel Maigret and the Hotel Majestic by Georges Simenon.

The film's sets were designed by the art director Guy de Gastyne.

The film earned admissions in France of 1,870,814. It was the last production of the German-controlled French film production company Continental Films, which was dissolved after the Liberation of Paris.

== Cast ==
- Albert Préjean as Le commissaire Jules Maigret
- Suzy Prim as Émilie Petersen
- Jacques Baumer as Arthur Donge
- Denise Grey as Madame Van Bell
- Jean Marchat as Fred Petersen
- André Gabriello as L'inspecteur Lucas
- Gina Manès as Ginette, la femme de service
- René Génin as Ramuel
- Florelle as Charlotte Donge
- Fernand Charpin as Le juge d'instruction
- Denise Bosc as Hélène Donnegan, la secrétaire des Petersen
- Gabrielle Fontan as Rosalie, la bonne de Fualdès
- Georges Chamarat as Dussart, le veilleur de nuit du Majestic
- Marcel Lévesque as Le directeur de l'Agence Internationale
- Jean-Jacques Delbo as Enrico Fualdès
- Raymond Rognoni as Le directeur du Majestic
- Robert Demorget as Le petit Teddy Petersen

== Bibliography ==
- Goble, Alan. The Complete Index to Literary Sources in Film. Walter de Gruyter, 1999.
