= The Ferret (film) =

1950 film

- Directed by: Raymond Leboursier
- Written by: Stanislas-André Steeman (novel); Raymond Leboursier
- Produced by: René Bianco
- Starring: Jany Holt; Colette Darfeuil; Pierre Renoir
- Cinematography: Georges Million
- Edited by: Pierre Gérau
- Music by: Charly Bailly; André Varel
- Production company: Société Parisienne d'Art Technique
- Distributed by: Les Réalisations d'Art Cinématographique
- Release date: 10 February 1950
- Running time: 95 minutes
- Country: France
- Language: French

The Ferret (French: Le furet) is a 1950 French crime film directed by Raymond Leboursier and starring Jany Holt, Colette Darfeuil and Pierre Renoir. It was based on a novel by Stanislas-André Steeman. It features the character of Inspector Wens, who had appeared in several other films including The Murderer Lives at Number 21. Location shooting took place around Paris including the city's Orly Airport. The film's sets were designed by the art director Roland Quignon.

== Synopsis ==
A mysterious figure signing himself "The Ferret" keeps sending letters to the police, tipping them off about murders that are to be committed around Paris. Among those caught up in the police manhunt is a fraudulent clairvoyant.

== Main cast ==
- Jany Holt as Cécile
- Colette Darfeuil as Louise Heller
- Pierre Renoir as Le docteur Darvel-Juste
- Jacques Baumer as Commissaire Hyacinthe
- Jean-Jacques Delbo as Ludovic
- Pierre Larquey as Monsieur Thiais
- Jean Tissier as Monsieur de Thomaz
- Jacqueline Delubac as Madame de Lanier
- Charles Dechamps as Lecartier
- Marguerite Deval as Madame Chapuis
- Pierre Jourdan as L'inspecteur Wens

== Bibliography ==
- Goble, Alan. The Complete Index to Literary Sources in Film. Walter de Gruyter, 1999.
