= The Riverside Murder =

1935 film

- Opening titles
- Directed by: Albert Parker
- Written by: Selwyn Jepson
- Based on: The Six Dead Men by Stanislas-André Steeman
- Produced by: Leslie Landau; Albert Parker
- Starring: Basil Sydney; Judy Gunn; Zoe Davis; Alastair Sim
- Cinematography: Alex Bryce
- Edited by: Reginald Beck
- Production company: Fox Film
- Distributed by: Fox Film
- Release date: 5 March 1935
- Running time: 64 minutes
- Country: United Kingdom
- Language: English

The Riverside Murder is a 1935 British crime film directed by Albert Parker and starring Basil Sydney, Judy Gunn and Zoe Davis. It was written by Selwyn Jepson based on the 1931 novel The Six Dead Men by Belgian author Stanislas-André Steeman, with the setting changed from France to London. The novel was also adapted as the 1941 French film The Last of the Six.

The film was shot at Wembley Studios in London with sets designed by the art director Ralph W. Brinton. A quota quickie, it was produced and distributed by Fox Film.

A woman reporter helps an inspector solve the deaths of four financiers on the eve of a group shareout. It marked the film debut of Alastair Sim.

== Plot summary ==
Robert Norman is shot dead at his home. Inspector Winton arrives on the scene to investigate the murder and finds that it has occurred shortly before an important meeting between a group of five financiers of whom Norman was one. Budding journalist Claire Haines also manages to talk her way into the house in an attempt to impress her editor by gathering exclusive news on the murder. The other financiers realize they are also in danger when another one of their number is murdered. Inspector Winton sets a trap for the killer using one of the financiers as bait.

== Cast ==
- Basil Sydney as Inspector Philip Winton
- Judy Gunn as Claire Haines
- Zoe Davis as Mrs. Harris
- Alastair Sim as Police Sergeant "Mac" McKay
- Reginald Tate as Hubert Perrin
- Ian Fleming as Henry Sanders
- Tom Helmore as Alfred Jerome
- Martin Lewis as William Gregg
- C. M. Hallard as Dickenson – Norman's attorney
- Aubrey Mallalieu as Robert Norman
- Ernest Borrow as Superintendent Field
- Sidney Monckton as Globe reporter
- Albert Parker as film director

== Reception ==
Kine Weekly wrote: "Ingenious murder mystery drama, commendably compact, and clear and exciting in its telling. Romance thrills, and comedy are adroitly mixed, and the development in spite of a preponderance of dialogue, works smoothly to a brisk and unexpected climax. ... Basil Sydney has an easy, engaging way with him as Philip Winton, but is clever enough not to allow it to rob the character of conviction. ... Alister Sims [sic], Tom Helmore and Jan Fleming are the most pominent of the strong and capable supporting cast."

The Daily Film Renter wrote: "Well-knit, slickly presented, fraught with suspense values and surprise denouement. Romantic element is neatly introduced. Judy Gunn and Basil Sydney give smooth portrayals, Alastair Sim supplying amusing Scots comedy."
