= Gilberte Géniat =

French actress (1916–1986)

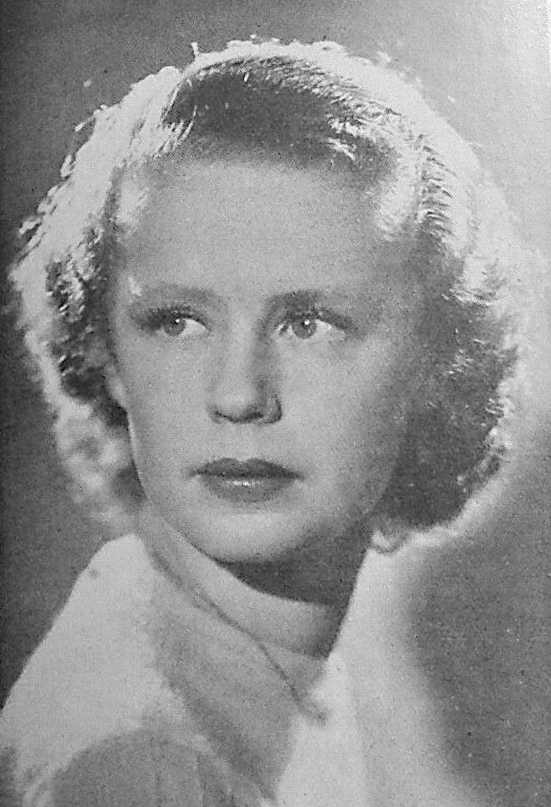
- Born: 17 February 1916; Paris, France
- Died: 28 June 1986 (aged 70); Paris, France
- Other name: Gilberte Martel de la Chesnaye
- Occupation: Actress
- Years active: 1936–1986 (film)

Gilberte Géniat (February 17, 1916 – June 28, 1986) was a French film actress.

== Selected filmography ==
- Hélène (1936)
- The Citadel of Silence (1937) - Catherine
- Mademoiselle ma mère (1937) - Louise, la bonne
- L'affaire du courrier de Lyon (1937) - La fille Sauton
- The Chain Breaker (1941) - Estelle
- Ce n'est pas moi (1941) - Geneviève
- Quai des Orfèvres (1947) - Mme Beauvoir, la concierge
- Scandale (1948)
- Thus Finishes the Night (1949) - Jeannette
- On ne triche pas avec la vie (1949) - Gaby
- Here Is the Beauty (1950) - La femme de chambre (uncredited)
- La caissière (uncredited)
- Quay of Grenelle (1950)
- Lost Souvenirs (1950) - Solange, l'épicière (segment "Le violon")
- Without Leaving an Address (1951) - La cliente de la voyante (uncredited)
- La passante (1951) - La téléphoniste
- The Beautiful Image (1951) - Annette, la bonne
- Matrimonial Agency (1952) - La marchande de billets
- Act of Love (1953) - Mrs. Ethel Henderson (uncredited)
- Zoé (1954)
- Marie Antoinette Queen of France (1956) - Une émeutière (uncredited)
- Les livreurs (1961) - Germaine
- La Belle Américaine (1961) - Mme Zoutin
- L'empire de la nuit (1962)
- Two Are Guilty (1963) - Une dame du jury
- Carom Shots (1963) - Madame Brossard
- Diary of a Chambermaid (1964) - Rose
- Les risques du métier (1967) - Madame Monnier
- La Prisonnière (1968) - La patronne de l'auberge
- A Very Curious Girl (1969) - Rose
- The Pleasure Pit (1969) - La bouchère
- The Lady in the Car with Glasses and a Gun (1970) - Village Storekeeper
- Distracted (1970) - La speakerine (uncredited)
- Le drapeau noir flotte sur la marmite (1971) - Mme Volabruque
- A Time for Loving (1972) - La concierge
- Such a Gorgeous Kid Like Me (1972) - Isobel Bliss
- The Day of the Jackal (1973) - Paris Apartment Concierge (uncredited)
- Défense de savoir (1973)
- Fear Over the City (1975)
- Les Ambassadeurs (1976) - La boulangère
- The Lacemaker (1977)
- Dernière sortie avant Roissy (1977) - (uncredited)
- Get Out Your Handkerchiefs (1978) - L'ouvreuse du théâtre
- An Adventure for Two (1979) - Zézette
- La smala (1984) - La concierge
- Marche à l'ombre (1984) - La retraitée
- American Dreamer (1984) - Embassy Guest #2
- La femme ivoire (1984) - La femme à l'éther
- Hôtel du Paradis (1987) - Caretaker (final film role)

== Bibliography ==
- Chiesi, Roberto. Alain Delon. Gremese Editore, 2002.
