= Cecile Is Dead (film) =

1944 film directed by Maurice Tourneur

- Directed by: Maurice Tourneur
- Written by: Jean-Paul Le Chanois; Michel Duran
- Based on: Cecile Is Dead by Georges Simenon
- Starring: Albert Préjean; Santa Relli; Germaine Kerjean
- Cinematography: Pierre Montazel
- Edited by: Gérard Bensdorp
- Music by: Roger Dumas
- Production company: Continental Films
- Distributed by: L'Alliance Cinématographique Européenne
- Release date: 8 March 1944
- Running time: 90 minutes
- Country: France
- Language: French

Cecile Is Dead (French: Cécile est morte!) is a 1944 French crime film directed by Maurice Tourneur and starring Albert Préjean, Santa Relli and Germaine Kerjean. It is based on the 1942 novel of the same title—known in the Anglosphere as Maigret and the Spinster—by Georges Simenon featuring his detective Jules Maigret.

The film's sets were designed by the art director Guy de Gastyne. The film was made by the German-controlled Continental Films.

== Main cast ==
- Albert Préjean as Le commissaire Maigret
- Santa Relli as Cécile
- Germaine Kerjean as Madame Boynet
- Luce Fabiole as Madame Petitot, la concierge
- Liliane Maigné as Nouchi
- André Gabriello as Lucas
- Jean Brochard as Dandurand
- André Reybaz as Gérard Pardon
- Yves Deniaud as Machepied
- Marcel Carpentier as Dr. Pierre
- Marcel André as Le directeur de la P.J.
- Henry Bonvallet as Le juge d'instruction
- Charles Blavette as Monfils

== Bibliography ==
- Waldman, Harry (2001). Maurice Tourneur: The Life and Films. McFarland. ISBN 978-0786409570.
