= The Last of the Six =

1941 film

- Directed by: Georges Lacombe
- Written by: Henri-Georges Clouzot
- Based on: The Six Dead Men by Stanislas-André Steeman
- Produced by: Alfred Greven; Max Winkler
- Starring: Pierre Fresnay; Michèle Alfa; Suzy Delair
- Cinematography: Robert Lefebvre
- Music by: Jean Alfaro
- Production company: Continental Films
- Distributed by: ACE
- Release date: 16 September 1941
- Running time: 90 minutes
- Country: France
- Language: French

The Last of the Six (French: Le dernier des six) is a 1941 French mystery thriller film directed by Georges Lacombe and starring Pierre Fresnay, Michèle Alfa and Suzy Delair. It was shot at the Billancourt Studios in Paris. The film's sets were designed by the art director Andrej Andrejew. It is based on the 1931 novel The Six Dead Men by the Belgian writer Stanislas-André Steeman.

The film was made in Occupied France by the German-backed Continental Films, with the screenplay by Henri-Georges Clouzot who headed the company's scenario department. It was followed by a sequel in 1942 The Murderer Lives at Number 21 directed by Clouzot, with Fresnay and Delair reprising their roles.

== Cast ==
- Pierre Fresnay as Le commissaire Wensceslas Voroboevitch dit Monsieur Wens
- Michèle Alfa as Lolita Gernicot
- Suzy Delair as Mila Malou - une chanteuse de cabaret, la maîtresse gouailleuse de Wens
- Jean Tissier as Henri Tignol
- André Luguet as Henri Senterre
- Jean Chevrier as Jean Perlonjour
- Lucien Nat as Marcel Gernicot
- Georges Rollin as Georges Gribbe dit Jo
- Raymond Segard as Namotte
- Odette Barencey as Pâquerette
- Henri Bargin as Un homme
- Jacques Beauvais as Le maître d'hôtel
- Rivers Cadet as Un inspecteur
- Martine Carol as Une femme
- Paul Demange as Fabien - le maître d'hôtel de Senterre
- Pierre Labry as L'inspecteur Picard
- Roger Legris as Le photographe
- Albert Malbert as Le patron du garni
- Marcel Maupi as Le régisseur
- Robert Ozanne as L'inspecteur Dallandier
- Maurice Salabert as Un inspecteur
- Robert Vattier as L'administrateur
- Frank Villard as Un homme
- Charles Vissières as Le concierge

== Bibliography ==
- Goble, Alan. The Complete Index to Literary Sources in Film. Walter de Gruyter, 1999.
- Hayward, Susan. Les Diaboliques (Henri-Georges Clouzot, 1955). University of Illinois Press, 2005.
- Mayne, Judith. Le Corbeau: (Henri-Georges Clouzot, 1943). University of Illinois Press, 2007.
