= Max Winkler =

German politician (1875–1961)

Max Winkler (7 September 1875 – 12 October 1961) was a politician and senior political appointee in the local government of West Prussia, the national government of the German Empire, the Nazi government of the German Reich, and the post-war government of West Germany.

== Origins ==
Born in Karrasch, Germany (now Karaś, Poland), Winkler came from a family of teachers. As a teenager, he was working for the postal service by 1891. By 1914 he was a city councillor in Graudenz, West Prussia (now Grudziądz, Poland), and by November 1918 was the last mayor of German Graudenz. This portion of West Prussia was part of the Polish Corridor, ceded to the Second Republic of Poland, following World War I, to provide it access to the Baltic Sea.

From 1919 Winkler was a member of the Landtag in Prussia for the German Democratic Party, and between 1920 and 1933 served as Reich Trustee for Ceded German Areas.

== German film ==
As head of Cautio Treuhand GmbH, a German holding company, Winkler was trusted with the task of economically and culturally supporting ethnic German communities in other countries, and establishing the "fortification" of German minority newspapers. After Adolf Hitler became Chancellor of Nazi Germany in 1933, Winkler was instrumental in the Gleichschaltung (bringing in line) of the press.

Winkler did not join the ruling Nazi Party until 1937. In the same year, the Führer named him "Reich Commissioner for the German Film Industry". In this function, by order of Joseph Goebbels's Propaganda Ministry, he decreed appointments and instructions which curtailed the industry's entrepreneurial freedom. This included the nationalization of controlling interests in all German film production companies, most importantly Universum Film AG and Tobis Film. Winkler's Cautio holding company also financed the creation of Continental Films within occupied France, producer of 30 feature films between 1941 and 1944, for example The Murderer Lives at Number 21.

Between 1939 and 1945, Winkler was leader of the Main Trusteeship Office East (Haupttreuhandstelle Ost), responsible for the administration of seized industrial and property assets in Poland during World War II.

== After World War II ==
After the war, Winkler was held in an internment camp while the Denazification court in Lüneburg considered his fate. By 11 August 1949, the court had classified Winkler as "uncharged" and released him. He then became a staffer at a film company. Under orders from the new West German government, Winkler was involved in the attempted Denazification of the Universum Film AG company—whose product was so associated with the Third Reich that reissues of its non-political catalogue were proving difficult to market.

Winkler died in 1961 in Düsseldorf.
