= Stanislas-André Steeman =

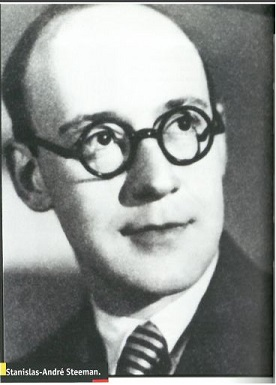
- Born: 23 January 1908; Liège, Belgium
- Died: 15 December 1970 (aged 62); Menton, France
- Known for: Illustrator and French-language author
- Notable work: The Murderer Lives at Number 21
- Spouse: Charlotte Jordens (1918–2011)

Stanislas-Andre Steeman (Liège on 23 January 1908 – Menton on 15 December 1970) was a Belgian illustrator and French-language author. His family, originally of Flemish extraction, had long been settled in Liège.

He wrote many mystery novels, some of which were adapted to the screen, such as The Murderer Lives at Number 21 or Mystery in Shanghai. Henri-Georges Clouzot's Quai des Orfèvres is based on his novel Légitime Défense.

== Partial bibliography ==
- The Six Dead Men (1931)
- La Nuit du 12 au 13 (1931)
- Le Mannequin assassiné (1932)
- Les Atouts de Monsieur Wens (1932)
- L'Ennemi sans visage (1934)
- L'assassin habite au 21 (1939)
- Légitime Défense (1942)
- Crimes à vendre (1951)
- 18 Fantômes (1952)
- Six hommes à tuer (1956)

== Filmography ==
- The Riverside Murder, directed by Albert Parker (1935, based on the novel The Six Dead Men)
- The Last of the Six, directed by Georges Lacombe (1941, based on the novel The Six Dead Men)
- The Murderer Lives at Number 21, directed by Henri-Georges Clouzot (1942, based on the novel L'assassin habite au 21)
- The Faceless Enemy, directed by Robert-Paul Dagan and Maurice Cammage (1946, based on the novel L'Ennemi sans visage)
- Monsieur Wens Holds the Trump Cards, directed by E.G. de Meyst (1947, based on the novel Les Atouts de Monsieur Wens)
- Quai des Orfèvres, directed by Henri-Georges Clouzot (1947, based on the novel Légitime Défense)
- The Murdered Model, directed by Pierre de Hérain (1948, based on the novel Le Mannequin assassiné)
- La muerte camina en la lluvia, directed by Carlos Hugo Christensen (1948, based on the novel L'assassin habite au 21)
- The Ferret, directed by Raymond Leboursier (1950, based on the novel Crimes à vendre)
- Mystery in Shanghai, directed by Roger Blanc (1950, based on the novel La Nuit du 12 au 13)
- Full House, directed by Henri Verneuil (1952, Anthology film about Jules Maigret, Lemmy Caution and Inspector Wens)
- Dortoir des grandes, directed by Henri Decoin (1953, based on the novel 18 Fantômes)
- Que personne ne sorte, directed by Ivan Govar (1964, based on the novel Six hommes à tuer)

== See also ==
- Belgian literature
