= Pierre Jourdan (actor) =

French actor and director

Pierre Jourdan (21 September 1932 – 16 August 2007) born Pierre Gendre in Cannes, was an actor and director.

== Honours ==
- CableACE Awards, 1987

== Filmography ==
=== As director ===
- 1968: Phèdre
- 1972: Le trouvère
- 1972: Un danseur: Rudolph Nureyev (I Am a Dancer)
- 1974: Norma
- 1974: Tristan und Isolde
- 1977: Aida
- 1979: Fidelio
- 1982: Ciboulette (TV)
- 1990: Manon Lescaut (TV)
- 1990: La Légende de Joseph en Égypte (TV)
- 1991: Henry VIII (TV)
- 1992: Christobal Colomb (TV)
- 1994: Une éducation manquée (TV)
- 1994: Le Songe d'une nuit d'été (TV)
- 1994: J'aime le music-hall (TV)
- 1994: De Serge Gainsbourg à Gainsbarre de 1958 - 1991 (vidéo)
- 1994: La Colombe (TV)
- 1995: Le Domino noir (TV)
- 1996: Mignon (TV)
- 1996: Llanto por Ignacio Sanchez (TV)
- 1996: Médée (TV)
- 1997: Les Noces de Figaro (TV)
- 1998: La Jolie Fille de Perth (TV)
- 1999: Pelléas et Mélisande (TV)
- 1999: Les Diamants de la couronne (TV)
- 2005: Noé (TV)
- 2006: Les caprices de Marianne by Henri Sauguet after Alfred de Musset, (Théâtre impérial de Compiègne)

=== Actor ===
- The Benefactor (1942)
- Chiffon's Wedding (1942)
- The Blue Veil (1942)
- Monsieur La Souris (1942)
- The Woman I Loved Most (1942)
- Lucrèce (1943)
- The Count of Monte Cristo (1943)
- Monsieur de Falindor (1947)
- The Husbands of Leontine (1947)
- The Ferret (1950)
- Mystery in Shanghai (1950)
- The Crime of Bouif (1952)
- Little Jacques (1953)
- The Red and the Black (1954)
- Not Delivered (1958)
