= La fille du torrent =

- Directed by: Hans Herwig
- Starring: Alida Valli
- Cinematography: Jacques Lang
- Music by: Jacques Lacombe
- Release date: 1962
- Country: United Kingdom
- Language: French

La fille du torrent (French for "The daughter of the torrent") is a 1962 French comedy-drama film written and directed by Hans Herwig.

== Plot ==
Widowed at the age of twenty, Madame Boissière is a real mother hen who broods to excess over her two sons Robert and Claude. She ruined the marriage of one and keeps the other away from any female presence. The latter runs away and marries a girl from the mountain. When his brother dies, the couple agree to come back to live with Madame Boissière, who tries to separate them.

== Cast ==
- Alida Valli as Livia Boissière
- Robert Etcheverry as Claude Boissière
- Jacques Fontan as Robert
- Erika Spaggiari as Irène
- Pauline Carton as la bonne
- Alain Quercy as Albert Boissière
