= Lost Souvenirs =

1950 film

- Directed by: Christian-Jaque
- Written by: Christian-Jaque; Jacques Companéez; Henri Jeanson; Jacques Prévert; Pierre Prévert; Pierre Véry; Bernard Zimmer
- Produced by: Constantin Geftman; Jacques Roitfeld
- Starring: Bernard Blier; Pierre Brasseur; Suzy Delair
- Cinematography: Christian Matras
- Edited by: Jacques Desagneaux
- Music by: Joseph Kosma
- Production company: Gray-Film
- Distributed by: Cocinor
- Release date: 11 November 1950
- Running time: 135 minutes
- Countries: France; Italy
- Language: French
- Box office: 2,386,014 admissions (France)

Lost Souvenirs (French: Souvenirs perdus) is a 1950 French drama film directed by Christian-Jaque and starring Bernard Blier, Pierre Brasseur and Suzy Delair. It was shot at the Billancourt Studios in Paris and on location around the city. The film's sets were designed by the art director Robert Gys. It was distributed by Cocinor in France, attracting more than two million spectators at the box office.

== Synopsis ==
The film consists of four individual episodes, each revolving around a separate object that acts as the catalyst of their plots.

== Main cast ==
- Bernard Blier as L'agent de police Raoul (segment "Le violon")
- Pierre Brasseur as Philippe (segment "Une statuette d'Osiris")
- Suzy Delair as Suzy Henebey (episode "Une couronne mortuaire")
- Danièle Delorme as Danièle (segment "Une cravate de fourrure")
- Edwige Feuillère as Florence (segment "Une statuette d'Osiris")
- Yves Montand as Raoul, un chanteur des rues (segment "Le violon")
- François Périer as Jean-Pierre Delagrange (episode "Une couronne mortuaire")
- Gérard Philipe as Gérard de Narçay (segment "Une cravate de fourrure")
- Armand Bernard as Armand, le majordome de Jean-Pierre (episode "Une couronne mortuaire")
- Léonce Corne as Le vendeur de billets de loterie (segment "Le violon")
- Gilberte Géniat as Solange, l'épicière (segment "Le violon")
- Yolande Laffon as Mme Delagrange (episode "Une couronne mortuaire")
- Daniel Lecourtois as Le directeur de l'hôtel
- Jacques Tarride as Le secrétaire
- Christian Simon as Le petit Raoul
- Jean Davy as Le speaker

== Bibliography ==
- Edward Baron Turk. Child of Paradise: Marcel Carné and the Golden Age of French Cinema. Harvard University Press, 1989.
