= Paul de Maleingreau =

French/Belgian organist (1887–1956)

Paul Constant Eugène de Maleingreau (23 November 1887 - 9 January 1956) was a Belgian composer and organist.

== Biography ==
Paul Constant Eugène Malengreau was born in Trélon, Nord, France. He later changed his surname to "de Maleingreau". From 1905 to 1912 he studied at the Brussels Conservatory where his principal teachers were Alfons Desmet, Paul Gilson and Edgar Tinel. He began teaching at the Conservatory in 1913 and was professor of organ (succeeding Desmet) from 1929 until 1953. His pupils included Pierre Froidebise, Charles Koenig, Robert Kohnen, Marcel Druart, Paul Sprimont and Herman Roelstraete.

In 1921 and 1922 he was the first to play Bach’s complete organ works in Brussels.

Gregorian plainsong forms the basis of most of Malengreau’s compositions, and indeed part of his output is intended for the liturgy. He also wrote programme music, his organ symphonies being inspired by paintings by Rogier van der Weyden and the van Eyck brothers. While the chromaticism and cyclic treatment of themes reveal the influence of Franck, certain harmonic progressions are typical of Impressionist music.

He was a member of the Libre Académie, and died in Brussels in 1956.

== Selected works ==
Publication dates and publishers in parentheses where known.

=== Organ ===
- Op. 2 Élévation (1912, Hérelle)
- Op. 3 no. 1 Post partum Virgo inviolata permansisti (Hérelle, Fortemps)
- Op. 3 no. 2 Ego sum panis vivus (Hérelle, Fortemps)
- Op. 10 Opus sacrum: In nativitate Domini (1920, Chester)
- Op. 14 Suite (1919, Durand)
- Op. 18 nos.1 & 2 Offrande musicale (1920, Chester)
- Op. 18 no. 3 Toccata (1920, Chester)
- Op. 19 Symphonie de Noël (1920, Chester)
- Op. 20 Symphonie de la Passion (1923, Senart)
- Op. 22 Opus sacrum II: In feriis Quadragesimae (1923, Senart)
- Op. 23 Triptyque pour la Noël (1923, Salabert)
- Op. 24 Symphonie de l’Agneau mystique (1926, Leduc)
- Op. 25 Préludes à l’introit pour orgue sans pédale (1924, Senart)
- Op. 26 no. 4 Noël parisienne
- Op. 27 Élévations liturgiques (1935, Herelle-Philippo)
- Op. 30 Messe du jour de Noël (1938, Philippo)
- Op. 31 Messe de pâques (Hérelle-Philippo)
- Op. 35 Méditation pour le temps pascal: Quoniam ipsius est mare (1939, Hérelle)
- Op. 60 Préludes de carème (1952, Oxford)
- Op. 65 Suite mariale (1939, Oxford)
- Op. 71 Suite: Four paraphrases on hymns to the Virgin (1937, Oxford)
- Op. 103 Diptyque de la Toussaint (1952, Fischer)

=== Piano ===
- Op. 7 Prélude-Chorale et fugue (1920, Chester)
- Op. 8 No. 1 Cygnes de neige sur des lacs de Lapis-Lazuli (F. Lauweryns)
- Op. 9 Suite pour piano (1920, Chester)
- Op. 12 Sonatine pour piano (1917, Lauweryns)
- Op. 17 Les angelus du printemps : suite pittoresque pour piano (1920, Chester)
- Suite enfantine (1934, Senart)

=== Chamber ===
- Op. 15 Sonate pour violoncelle et piano (1919, Durand)
