= The Six Dead Men =

1931 novel

- Author: Stanislas-André Steeman
- Language: French
- Genre: Mystery
- Publisher: Le Masque
- Publication date: 1931
- Publication place: Belgium
- Media type: Print
- Followed by: The Night of the 12th-13th

The Six Dead Men (French: Six hommes morts) is a 1931 mystery detective novel by the Belgian writer Stanislas-André Steeman. It was the first novel featuring the detective character Monsieur Wens who had previously appeared in some short stories.

== Synopsis ==
Six men agree a pact to meet in five years time and share whatever fortunes they have made. As the date approaches, however, they begin to be killed off.

== Adaptations ==
It has been adapted twice for cinema. The 1935 British film The Riverside Murder directed by Albert Parker and starring Basil Sydney and the 1941 French film The Last of the Six directed by Georges Lacombe and starring Pierre Fresnay.

== Bibliography ==
- Lloyd, Christopher. Henri-Georges Clouzot. Manchester University Press, 2007.
- Goble, Alan. The Complete Index to Literary Sources in Film. Walter de Gruyter, 1999.
- Pitts, Michael R. Thrills Untapped: Neglected Horror, Science Fiction and Fantasy Films, 1928-1936. McFarland, 2018.
