= Lucrèce (film) =

1943 film

- Directed by: Léo Joannon
- Written by: Georges Neveux; Claude-André Puget; Solange Térac
- Produced by: Roger De Venloo
- Starring: Edwige Feuillère; Pierre Jourdan; Jean Tissier
- Cinematography: Christian Matras
- Edited by: Jeannette Berton
- Music by: Roland Manuel
- Production company: Majestic Films
- Distributed by: Les Films Vog
- Release date: 15 December 1943
- Running time: 93 minutes
- Country: France
- Language: French

Lucrèce is a 1943 French drama film directed by Léo Joannon and starring Edwige Feuillère, Pierre Jourdan and Jean Tissier. The film's sets were designed by the art director Roland Quignon.

== Cast ==
- Edwige Feuillère as Lucrèce
- Pierre Jourdan as Rudi Daré
- Jean Tissier as Barbanzanges
- Jean Mercanton as François
- Marcelle Monthil as Christine
- Louis Seigner as Maître Broizin - le tuteur de François
- Jean Sinoël as Le premier commanditaire
- Charles Lemontier as Le deuxième commanditaire
- Geneviève Morel as L'habilleuse
- Luce Fabiole as La gouvernante du tuteur
- Marc Doelnitz as Un collégien
- Jean Buquet as Un collégien
- Jacques Emmanuel as Un collégien
- Daniel Gélin as Un collégien
- Pierre Ringel as Un collégien
- Paul Demange as Le concierge

== Bibliography ==
- Burch, Noël & Sellier, Geneviève. The Battle of the Sexes in French Cinema, 1930–1956. Duke University Press, 2013.
- Oscherwitz, Dayna & Higgins, MaryEllen . The A to Z of French Cinema. Scarecrow Press, 2009.
- Rège, Philippe. Encyclopedia of French Film Directors, Volume 1. Scarecrow Press, 2009.
