= The Murdered Model =

1948 film

- Directed by: Pierre de Hérain
- Written by: Georges Chaperot; Pierre Lestringuez
- Based on: The Murdered Model by Stanislas-André Steeman
- Produced by: Robert Lussac; Hervé Missir
- Starring: Blanchette Brunoy; Gilbert Gil; Julien Carette
- Cinematography: Marcel Grignon
- Edited by: Henriette Wurtzer
- Music by: Jean Hubeau
- Production companies: Etendard Films; Ciné Reportages Hervé Missir
- Distributed by: Les Films Constellation
- Release date: 10 March 1948
- Running time: 82 minutes
- Countries: France; Belgium
- Language: French

The Murdered Model (French: Le mannequin assassiné) is a 1948 French-Belgian comedy crime film directed by Pierre de Hérain and starring Blanchette Brunoy, Gilbert Gil and Julien Carette. It is based on the 1932 novel The Murdered Model by Stanislas-André Steeman. It was shot at the Buttes-Chaumont Studios in Paris. The film's sets were designed by the art director Lucien Aguettand. It marked the screen debut of Anne Vernon who went on to star in French and British films.

== Synopsis ==
A mannequin stolen from the a shop window is found stabbed to death. It bears a curious resemblance to a man who was killed a year before.

== Cast ==
- Blanchette Brunoy as Laure
- Gilbert Gil as Armand
- Julien Carette as Léonisse
- Daniel Gélin as Léopold
- Jean-Roger Caussimon as Jérôme
- Anne Vernon as Irène
- Jacques Castelot as Emile
- Jacques Sevrannes as Gilbert
- Robert Balpo as Le chef de train
- Geneviève Callix as Rose
- André Gabriello as Charles
- Pierre Magnier as Le notaire
- Albert Dinan as Didier
- Stanislas-André Steeman as Le docteur Furnelle
- Mathilde Casadesus as Madame Malaise
- Robert Lussac as Le commissaire Aimé Malaise
- Germaine Dermoz as Irma
- Albert Broquin as Un consommateur
- Sylvain as Le clerc de notaire

== Bibliography ==
- Goble, Alan. The Complete Index to Literary Sources in Film. Walter de Gruyter, 1999.
