= Hans Herwig =

Hans Herwig (10 April 1909 Vienna – 5 October 1967 Germany) was an Austrian film producer and director.

== Filmography ==
=== Producer ===
- 1950 : Mystery in Shanghai, by Roger Blanc
- 1952 : Les Surprises d'une nuit de noces, by Jean Vallée
- 1953 : L'Étrange Amazone, by Jean Vallée
- 1955 : Passion de femmes

=== Director ===
- 1955 : Passion de femmes
- 1961 : La Fille du torrent
