= Jean-Yves Le Naour =

French historian and popularizer

- Born: April 26, 1972 (age 53)
- Education: University of Picardy (PhD) (until 2000); Paris-Sorbonne University
- Occupations: Historian, cartoonist
- Employer(s): Cahiers de la Méditerranée, Revue des deux Mondes, University of Toulouse-Jean Jaurès
- Awards: Henri-Hertz Prize (2008) Grand prix du livre d'histoire Ouest-France (2011)
- Website: https://jeanyveslenaour.com/bienvenue-sur-http-s315100951-onlinehome-fr

Jean-Yves Le Naour, born April 26, 1972, in Meaux, is a French historian and popularizer specializing in the First World War and the 20th century. He is also a scriptwriter for comic strips and documentary films.

== Biography ==
Jean-Yves Le Naour defended a doctoral thesis on the First World War in 2000, which he published in 2002. A prolific author, some of his works has been published in foreign languages (English, Chinese, Swedish, Italian, Spanish, Korean, Dutch).

== Publications ==
=== Books ===
- Le soldat inconnu vivant [The Living Unknown Soldier]. La vie quotidienne (in French). Hachette. 2002.
- Misères et tourments de la chair durant la Grande Guerre. Les mœurs sexuelles des Français (1914-1918) [Deprivation and Torments of the Flesh during the Great War] (in French). Aubier. 2002.
- Histoire de l'avortement XIXe-XXe siècle (with Catherine Valenti). L’Univers historique (in French). Seuil. 2003.
- La Honte noire. L'Allemagne et les troupes coloniales françaises (1914-1945) (in French). Hachette-Littératures. 2004.
- « La famille doit voter ! » Histoire du vote familial (XIXe-XXe siècle) (in French). Hachette-Littératures. 2005.
- Marseille 1914-1918 (in French). Qui-Vive. 2005.
- Le Corbeau. Histoire vraie d'une rumeur (in French). Hachette-Littératures. 2006.
- Claire Ferchaud, Jeanne d'Arc de la Grande Guerre (in French). Hachette-Littératures. 2007.
- Meurtre au Figaro. L'affaire Caillaux (in French). Larousse. 2007.
- L'affaire Malvy. Le Dreyfus de la Grande Guerre (in French). Hachette. 2007.
- Le soldat inconnu. La guerre, la mort, la mémoire [The Living Unknown Soldier: A Story of Grief and the Great War]. Découvertes (in French). Gallimard. 2008.
- Cartes postales de poilus (with Georges Klochendler) (in French). First. 2008.
- La Première Guerre mondiale pour les nuls (with Georges Klochendler) (in French). First. 2008.
- Dictionnaire de la Première Guerre mondiale (in French). Larousse. 2008.
- Nostradamus s'en va-t-en guerre. 1914-1918 (in French). Hachette-Littératures. 2008.
- Histoire du XXe siècle (in French). Hachette-Littératures. 2009.
- On a volé le maréchal (in French). Larousse. 2009.
- Fusillés (in French). Larousse. 2010.
- Histoire de l'abolition de la peine de mort. Deux cents ans de combat (in French). Perrin. 2011.
- Désunion nationale. La légende noire des soldats du Midi (in French). Vendémiaire. 2011.
- Le dernier guillotiné (in French). Paris: First. 2011.
- Les soldats de la honte (in French). Perrin. 2011.
- 1914. La grande illusion (in French). Perrin. 2012.
- La Grande Guerre en archives colorisées (in French). Géo Histoire. 2013.
- La Grande Guerre en cartes postales (in French). HC éditions. 2013.
- Qui a volé la Joconde ? (in French). Vendémiaire. 2013.
- Et le viol devint un crime (with Catherine Valenti) (in French). Vendémiaire. 2014.
- 1915. L'enlisement (in French). Paris: Perrin. 2014.
- 1916: l'enfer (in French). Perrin. 2014.
- 1917: la paix impossible (in French). Perrin. 2015.
- 1918 : l'étrange victoire (in French). Perrin. 2016.
- Front d'Orient 1914-1919. Les soldats oubliés (in French). Éditions Gaussen. 2016.
- Les oubliés de l'histoire (with Jacques Malaterre) (in French). Flammarion. 2017.
- Djihad 14-18 (in French). Perrin. 2017. ISBN 9782262070830.
- 1914-1918. L'intégrale (in French). Perrin. 2018.
- L'assassinat de Georges Clemenceau (in French). Perrin. 2019.
- Fusillé sur son brancard. L'affaire Chapelant et les fantômes de la Grande Guerre (in French). Armand Colin. 2019.
- La gloire et l'oubli. Maurice Genevoix et Henri Barbusse témoins de la Grande Guerre (in French). Michalon. 2020.
- 1919-1921. Sortir de la guerre (in French). Perrin. 2020.
- 1922-1929. Les années folles? (in French). Perrin. 2022.

=== Comic books ===
- Bontemps, Didier (w, a). "Le vol de la Joconde" (2012). Roymodus, (in French).
- Lirussi, Mauro (a)"Le Soldat inconnu vivant" (2012). Roymodus, (in French).
- Plumail, Claude (w, a). "Le Soldat inconnu vivant" (2014). Bamboo, (in French).
- Chandre (w, a). "François-Ferdinand" (2014). Bamboo, (in French).
- A.Dan (a)"La faute au Midi, textes et dialogues" (2014). Bamboo, (in French).
- A.Dan (a)"La faute au Midi, textes et dialogues" (2014). Bamboo, (in French).
- Marko (a)"A bâbord toute ! Histoire de la gauche en BD" (2021). Dunod, (in French).
- Marko (a)"A tribord toute ! Histoire de la droite en BD" (2022). Dunod, (in French).
- Cassier, Manu (a)"L'affaire Markovic" (2022). Bamboo, (in French).
- Marko (a)"Gisèle Halimi, l'insoumise. Avocate pour changer le monde" (2023). Dunod, (in French).
- Marko (w)Holgado, Iñaki (a)"Comète. La ligne d'évasion" (2023). Bamboo, (in French).

==== Series ====
Charles de Gaulle

- Plumail, Claude (a)"1916-1921: Le prisonnier" Grand Angle, vol. 1 (2015). Bamboo, (in French).
- "1939-1940: L'homme qui a dit non" Grand Angle, vol. 2 (2016). Bamboo, (in French).
- "1944: L'heure de vérité" Grand Angle, vol. 3 (2017). Bamboo, (in French).
- "1958-1968: Joli mois de mai" Grand Angle, vol. 4 (2018). Bamboo, (in French).

Les compagnons de la Libération (The Liberation companions)

- Blier, Frédéric (a)"Général Leclerc" Grand Angle (2019). Bamboo, (in French).
- Holgado, Inaki (a)"Jean Moulin" Grand Angle (2019). Bamboo, (in French).
- Blier, Frédéric (a)"Philippe Kieffer" Grand Angle (2021). Bamboo, (in French).
- Mounier, Alain (a)"Hubert Germain" Grand Angle (2022). Bamboo, (in French).
- Goepfert, Brice (a)"L'île de Sein" Grand Angle (2022). Bamboo, (in French).
- Plumail, Claude (a)"Vassieux en Vercors" Grand Angle (2023). Bamboo, (in French).

Verdun

- Holgado, Inaki (w, a). "Verdun: avant l'orage" (2016). Bamboo, (in French).
- Holgado, Inaki (w, a). "Verdun: l'agonie du fort de Vaux" (2017). Bamboo, (in French).
- Holgado, Inaki (w, a). "Verdun: les fusillés de Fleury" (2018). Bamboo, (in French).

== Documentaries ==
- Calmettes, Joël (2004). Le Soldat inconnu vivant (Documentary) (in French).
- Weber, Christophe (2008). La dernière bataille du soldat inconnu (Documentary) (in French). Sunset and Institut national de l'audiovisuel.
- Migeot, Emmanuel (2008) [France]. Les Français dans la Grande Guerre (Documentary) (in French). Kilaohm productions and Établissement de communication et de production audiovisuelle de la Défense (ECPAD).
- Migeot, Emmanuel (2009). Filmer la guerre : filmer la guerre d'Indochine. Documentary series (in French). Vol. 1/2. Kilaohm productions and ECPAD.
- Migeot, Emmanuel (2009). Filmer la guerre : filmer la guerre d'Indochine. Documentary series (in French). Vol. 2/2. Kilaohm productions and ECPAD.
- Migeot, Emmanuel (2011). Notre ami l'empereur Bokassa (Documentary) (in French). Kilaohm productions and France 3.
- Migeot, Emmanuel (2011). Le dernier guillotiné (Documentary) (in French). Kilaohm productions and Planète Justice.
- Vidal, Ghislain (2011). Les procès de l'histoire - L'Affaire Henriette Caillaux (Documentary) (in French). Injam Production.
- Vidal, Ghislain (2012). Nos salles obscures (Documentary) (in French). Kilaohm productions and Histoire.
- Migeot, Emmanuel (2012). On a volé le Maréchal (Documentary) (in French). Kilaohm productions and France 3.
- Migeot, Emmanuel (2013). Le procès du viol (Documentary) (in French). Kilaohm productions and France 3. Audience Award at the Pessac Festival
- Migeot, Emmanuel (2014). Les Français du jour J (Documentary) (in French). Kilaohm productions and France 3.
- Quand la Grande Guerre rend fou (Documentary) (in French). Kilaohm productions and France 3. 2016.
- Corée: nos soldats oubliés (Documentary) (in French). Kilaohm productions and France 3. 2016.
- La Fayette nous voilà! (Documentary) (in French). Kilaohm productions and France 3. 2017.
- Malaterre, Jacques. Les oubliés de l'histoire (Television production) (in French). Arte.
- La Grande Guerre de tous les Français (Documentary) (in French). Kilaohm productions and France 3. 2018.
- L'Affaire Markovic. Coup bas chez les gaullistes (Documentary) (in French). Kilaohm productions and France 5. 2019.
- Les derniers tirailleurs (Documentary) (in French). Kilaohm productions and France 5. 2020.
- 1871 - La Commune, portraits d'une révolution (Documentary) (in French). Kilaohm productions and France 5. 2021.
- Gisèle Halimi. La cause des femmes (Documentary) (in French). Kilaohm productions and France 5. 2022.

== Awards ==
- 2008: Henri-Hertz Prize for L'Affaire Malvy
- 2011: Jean-Charles Sournia prize from the French Academy of Medicine.
- 2011: Grand prix du livre d'histoire Ouest-France for Les Soldats de la honte.
- 2013: Audience prize at the 2013 Pessac International History Film Festival for Le procès du viol
- 2014: Prix de l'Académie de Marseille for La faute au Midi.
- 2016: Audience Award at FIPA 2016 for Corée: nos soldats oubliés.

== See also ==
- Anthelme Mangin
- Le Corbeau (1943 film)
- Louis Malvy
