= Suzy Delair =

French actress and singer (1917–2020)

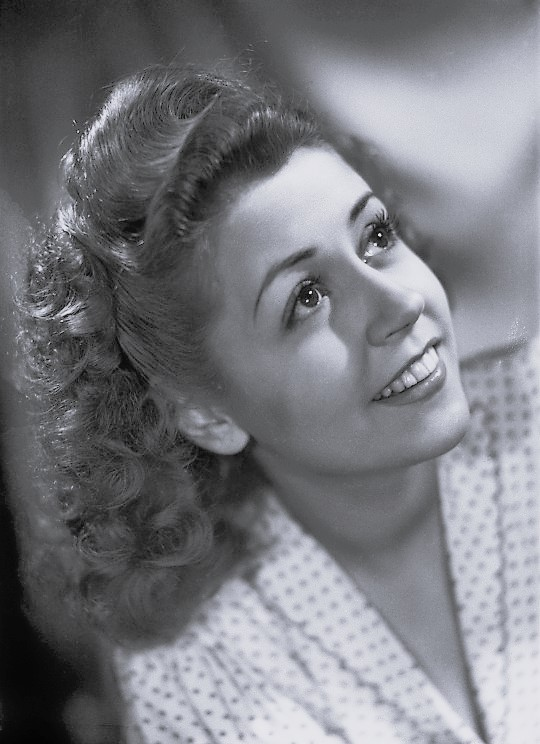
- Delair in 1950
- Born: Suzette Pierrette Delaire; December 31, 1917; Paris, France
- Died: March 15, 2020 (aged 102); Paris, France
- Occupations: Actress, dancer and singer
- Years active: 1931–1987
- Partner: Henri-Georges Clouzot

Suzy Delair (born Suzette Pierrette Delaire; December 31, 1917 – March 15, 2020) was a French actress, dancer, singer, comedian and star of vaudeville.

== Early years ==
Growing up in Montmartre, Delair was the daughter of a father who upholstered expensive cars' interiors, and a seamstress mother. She studied music at parisian music hall La Scala.

== Film ==
In 1942, Delair had a supporting role in The Murder Lives at Number 21, which had its American premiere in 1947 in New York City. Today's audiences probably know her best as the feminine lead in the Laurel and Hardy comedy Atoll K (also known as Utopia), filmed in France and released in 1951.

== Music ==
Before Delair began performing in films, she starred in operettas. On 28 February 1948 she sang C'est si bon at the Hotel Negresco during the first Nice Jazz Festival. Louis Armstrong was present and loved the song. On 26 June 1950 he recorded the American version of the song (English lyrics by Jerry Seelen) in New York City with Sy Oliver and his orchestra. When it was released, the disc was a worldwide success and the song was then performed by the greatest international singers.

== Personal life ==
For 12 years, Delair was the companion of French film director, producer and screenwriter Henri-Georges Clouzot.

== Selected filmography ==
- A Caprice of Pompadour (Willy Wolff et Joë Hamman, 1931) – Une soubrette de la Pompadour
- Imperial Violets (Henri Roussell), 1932)
- La Dame de chez Maxim's (Alexander Korda), 1933)
- Let's Touch Wood (1933) – La petite compagne d'amusement
- Professeur Cupidon (1933)
- Casanova (1934)
- Poliche (1934) – Une Danseuse (uncredited)
- The Depression Is Over (Robert Siodmak, 1934)
- The Crisis is Over (1934) – (uncredited)
- Dédé (Abel Gance, 1934) – Poliche (uncredited)
- Gold in the Street (K. Bernhardt, 1934) – Madeleine – L'amie de Gaby
- Ferdinand the Roisterer (1935) – Madame Alice – Une prostituée de la maison close (uncredited)
- The Hortensia Sisters (1935) – Une femme au cabaret (uncredited)
- Prends la route (Jean Boyer, 1936)
- Trois Six Neuf (Raymond Rouleau, 1937)
- The Last of the Six (Georges Lacombe, 1941) – Mila Malou
- The Murderer Lives at Number 21 (Henri-Georges Clouzot, 1942) – Mila Malou
- No Love Allowed (Richard Pottier, 1942) – Totte
- La Vie de Bohème (Marcel L'Herbier, 1945) – Phémie / Femia
- Carbon Copy (Jean Dréville, 1947) – Coraline–
- Quai des Orfèvres / Jenny Lamour (Henri-Georges Clouzot, 1947) – Jenny Lamour
- Par la fenêtre (Gilles Grangier, 1948) – Fernande
- White Paws (Jean Grémillon, 1949) – Odette Kerouan
- I'm in the Revue (Mario Soldati, 1950) – La Chanteuse
- Lady Paname (Henri Jeanson, 1950) – Raymonde Bosset, dite Caprice
- Lost Souvenirs (Christian-Jaque, 1950) – Suzy Henebey (episode "Une couronne mortuaire")
- Utopia (Léo Joannon, 1951) – Chérie Lamour
- Fly in the Ointment (Guy Lefranc, 1955) – Lucette Gauthier
- Fernandel the Dressmaker (Jean Boyer, 1956) – Adrienne Vignard
- Gervaise (René Clément, 1956) – Virginie Poisson
- The Regattas of San Francisco (Claude Autant-Lara, 1960) – Lucilla
- Rocco e i suoi fratelli ("Rocco and his Brothers", Luchino Visconti, 1960) – Luisa
- Du Mouron pour les petits oiseaux ("Chicken Feed for Little Birds", Marcel Carné, 1963) – Antoinette – La bouchère
- Paris brûle-t-il? (René Clément, 1966) – A Parisienne (uncredited)
- The Mad Adventures of "Rabbi" Jacob (Gérard Oury, 1973) – Germaine Pivert
- Forget Me, Mandoline (1976) – Mireille
