= Sweet Madness =

1951 film

- Directed by: Jean-Paul Paulin
- Written by: Marcel-Éric Grancher; Jean-Paul Paulin
- Based on: Sous le Pavillon Noir by Marcel-Éric Grancher
- Produced by: Pascal Paulin
- Starring: Lisette Jambel; Marthe Mercadier; Louis de Funès
- Cinematography: Pierre Petit
- Edited by: Gisèle Gouye
- Music by: Louis Gasté
- Production company: Francinalp
- Distributed by: Astoria Films
- Release date: 4 July 1951
- Running time: 90 minutes
- Country: France
- Language: French

Sweet Madness (French: Folie douce) is a 1951 French comedy film directed by Jean-Paul Paulin and starring Lisette Jambel, Marthe Mercadier and André Gabriello. The film's sets were designed by the art director Eugène Delfau.

== Synopsis ==
The president of a company goes mildly insane and is restrained by his associates in a lunatic asylum. However he escapes and returns to the head of the company showing great extravagances towards the employees that infuriate his fellow directors.

== Cast ==
- Lisette Jambel as Yolande
- Marthe Mercadier as Juliette
- André Gabriello as the captain Edgar Morgan
- Frédéric Duvallès as Mr Lancer-Léger
- Pierre-Louis as Arthur
- Louis de Funès
- Anne Beressy
- Christine Carrère
- Maxime Fabert
- Colette Régis
- Michel Nastorg
- Robert Lussac
- Suzanne Gabriello
- Robert Le Fort
- René Hell
- France Gabriel
- José Casa

== Bibliography ==
- Dicale, Bertrand. Louis de Funès, grimaces et gloire. Grasset, 2009.
- Rège, Philippe. Encyclopedia of French Film Directors, Volume 1. Scarecrow Press, 2009.
