= Le Corbeau =

- Directed by: Henri-Georges Clouzot
- Screenplay by: Louis Chavance; Henri-Georges Clouzot
- Produced by: René Montis
- Starring: Pierre Fresnay; Ginette Leclerc; Pierre Larquey; Micheline Francey
- Cinematography: Nicolas Hayer
- Music by: Tony Aubin
- Production company: Continental Films
- Distributed by: Tobis
- Release date: 28 September 1943
- Running time: 93 minutes
- Country: France
- Language: French

Le Corbeau (lit. 'The Raven') is a 1943 French mystery film noir directed by Henri-Georges Clouzot and starring Pierre Fresnay, Micheline Francey, Ginette Leclerc, and Pierre Larquey. Its plot focuses on a provincial French town where a number of citizens begin receiving anonymous letters containing libelous information, particularly targeting a doctor accused of providing abortions. The mystery surrounding the letters begins to tear apart the social fabric of the community, eventually escalating into violence and chaos. The screenplay is loosely based on an anonymous letter case that began in the town of Tulle, Limousin, in 1917.

Released in September 1943 at the height of World War II, Le Corbeau was subject to notable controversy. It was produced by Continental Films, a German production company established near the beginning of the Occupation of France, and was pulled from theatres under the right-wing Vichy government due to its depiction of immoral characters and "thinly veiled references to the destructive nature of informing on your neighbors", a common practice under the Vichy government. The film also faced censorship efforts from the French Left after the war, as it had been perceived by the underground and the Communist press as vilifying the French people, depicting their national character as anti-Resistance.

The political backlash over the film resulted in Clouzot initially being banned for life from directing in France, though this ban was ultimately lifted in 1947. The film remained suppressed until 1969. It was remade as The 13th Letter (1951) by Otto Preminger.

== Plot ==
In a small French town identified as "anywhere", anonymous poison pen letters are sent by somebody signing as "Le Corbeau" (the Raven). The letters start by accusing doctor Rémy Germain of having an affair with Laura Vorzet, the pretty young wife of the elderly psychiatrist Dr. Vorzet. Germain is also accused of performing illegal abortions. Letters are then sent to virtually all the population of the town, but keep getting back to the initial victim, Dr. Germain. The situation becomes increasingly serious when François, a patient of the hospital commits suicide with his straight razor after the Raven writes to him that his cancer is terminal.

Laura Vorzet's sister Marie Corbin, a nurse in the infirmary, becomes a suspect and is arrested, but soon new letters arrive. When one letter is dropped in a church from a gallery, it becomes apparent the Raven must be one of the people seated there at the time. They are gathered to re-write the Raven's letters as dictated by Dr. Vorzet, to compare the handwriting. Germain's lover Denise is suspected when she faints during the dictation, only for Laura to be identified by material found on her blotter.

Germain agrees to sign an order committing Laura as insane; he is called away to attend Denise, who has fallen down a flight of stairs, but, before he leaves, Laura protests she wrote the Raven's first letter before Dr. Vorzet began dictating them, making him the true Raven. Just as the ambulance takes Laura away, Germain returns to find Dr. Vorzet dead at his desk, his throat cut by the cancer patient's mother as he was writing the Raven's final, triumphant letter.

== Cast ==
- Pierre Fresnay as Doctor Rémy Germain
- Ginette Leclerc as Denise Saillens
- Pierre Larquey as Doctor Michel Vorzet
- Héléna Manson as Marie Corbin
- Pierre Bertin as The Sub-Prefect
- Liliane Maigné as Rolande Saillens
- Roger Blin as François
- Micheline Francey as Laura Vorzet
- Antoine Balpêtré as Doctor Delorme
- Louis Seigner as Doctor Bertrand
- Noël Roquevert as School Director Saillens
- Jean Brochard as Bonnevie
- Gustave Gallet as Fayolle
- Bernard Lancret as The Postmaster Delorme
- Sylvie as François' mother
- Jeanne Fusier-Gir as the Small-Wear Dealer
- Nicole Chollet as Vorzet's Maid
- Lucienne Bogaert as Woman
- Palmyre Levasseur as Magistrate
- Marcel Delaître as Preacher
- Pierre Palau as The Postmaster
- Pâquerette as Une suspecte
- Marie-Jacqueline Chantal as Une suspecte
- Robert Clermont as Monsieur de Maquet
- Étienne Decroux as Le garçon du cercle
- Paul Barge as Un homme
- Albert Brouett as Un suspect
- Eugène Yvernès as Un suspect
- Albert Malbert as Le Suisse

== Production ==
The film is loosely based on an anonymous letter case that had begun in the town of Tulle, Limousin, in 1917. Anonymous letters had been sent by somebody signing "the eye of the tiger". The first version of the screenplay was written by Louis Chavance shortly after the Tulle letters, years before it was finally produced. The film credits Clouzot for adapting the story himself, and both Clouzot and Chavance for writing the dialogue.

Le Corbeau was produced by Continental Films, which aside from being a German company established during Occupation, was known for making detective films "with a light, even comic tone" and often featuring Pierre Fresnay, who played Germain in this film. Clouzot previously worked with Fresnay on another Continental Films project, The Murderer Lives at Number 21 (1942). Writer Joseph Kessel later criticised the film's Continental origins, noting Le Corbeau was funded by the Germans, and in that context could be seen as a statement on French corruption. Kessel questioned if the film would be made if it were set in Germany.

It was shot at the Billancourt Studios in Paris with location filming around Montfort-l'Amaury. The film's sets were designed by the art director Andrej Andrejew.

== Release ==
Le Corbeau was released in France on 28 September 1943.

=== Censorship ===
Le Corbeau faced significant controversy and censorship after its release. The right-wing Vichy government had the film pulled from theaters due to the immorality of its characters, as well as the "thinly veiled references to the destructive nature of informing on your neighbors", a common practice under the Vichy government. After France's liberation at the end of World War II, the country's political left also supported censorship of the film because it depicted a microcosmic vision of the country that contradicted the notion that France had been a "top-to-bottom nation of heroic resisters." Despite the controversy, the film continued to screen privately in cineclubs throughout France and often drew thousands of moviegoers.

=== Home media ===
The film was released in the UK, on a Region 2 DVD by Optimum in 2005, and was given a PG certificate. It was released on DVD and Blu-ray by The Criterion Collection. The DVD went out of print by 2011, before Criterion reissued the film on Blu-ray in 2022, featuring a new 4K transfer.

== Reception ==
In 1947, the film was released commercially, with writer Henri Jeanson praising it as a major piece in French cinema, arguing it was repulsive, but, when compared to reality, became nearly romantic. Despite criticising its origins, Joseph Kessel, writing in response to Jeanson, said that Le Corbeau was indisputably a remarkable film.

Writing in 2004, Professor Alan Williams judged Le Corbeau to be "the first classic French film noir", though made before the term film noir was coined. He found low-key humour in the screenplay and also argued it posed "a properly philosophical debate about the effects of the German occupation", comparing the atmosphere created by the Raven's letters to that under Occupation.

One notable legacy of the film was to make "crow" a term for a malicious informant. In 1984, an anonymous letter-writer and phone-caller taunted a young family in Lépanges-sur-Vologne (France). The family's four-year-old son Gregory was abducted and found drowned in the river. The media labelled the anonymous killer (or killers) 'Le Corbeau'. No one has been apprehended for the crime. In 2006, the film enjoyed a resurgence in popularity in Paris after the Clearstream affair, in which anonymous letters accused French politicians of having hidden bank accounts.

== See also ==
- Cinema of France
- André Andrejew
- Murder of Grégory Villemin
- Jean-Yves Le Naour
- Wicked Little Letters (2023)

== Sources ==
- Lloyd, Christopher (2007). Henri-Georges Clouzot. Manchester, England: Manchester University Press. ISBN 978-0-7190-7014-3.
- Spotts, Frederic (2008). The Shameful Peace: How French Artists & Intellectuals Survived the Nazi Occupation. New Haven, Connecticut: Yale University Press. ISBN 978-0-300-14237-2.
