= Mystery in Shanghai =

1950 film

- Directed by: Roger Blanc
- Written by: Maurice Griffe; Jacques de Casembroot
- Based on: La Nuit du 12 au 13 by Stanislas-André Steeman
- Produced by: Hans Herwig
- Starring: Paul Bernard; Hélène Perdrière; Maurice Teynac
- Cinematography: Enzo Riccioni
- Edited by: Jeannette Berton; Claude Gros
- Music by: Jean Solar; Maurice Thiriet
- Production company: Rapid Films
- Distributed by: Les Films Vog
- Release date: 24 November 1950
- Running time: 85 minutes
- Country: France
- Language: French

Mystery in Shanghai (French: Mystère à Shanghai) is a 1950 French crime film directed by Roger Blanc and starring Paul Bernard, Hélène Perdrière and Maurice Teynac. It is based on the novel La Nuit du 12 au 13 by Stanislas-André Steeman.

The film's sets were designed by the art director Aimé Bazin.

== Synopsis ==
In Shanghai, a Chinese criminal organisation plans to kill Herbert Aboody if he doesn't pay them $50,000.

== Cast ==
- Paul Bernard as Herbert Aboody
- Maurice Teynac as Inspecteur Wens
- Hélène Perdrière as Floriane Aboody
- Pierre Jourdan as Steve
- Andrews Engelmann as Zetskaïa
- Robert Lussac as Maloise
- Ky Duyen as Commissaire Whu
- Stanislas-André Steeman as Matriche
- Gilberte Clair as Mona
- Krisha Duchesne as Lydia
- Lonne Voo as Lotus
- Georgette Anys
