= Visit to Picasso =

Belgian documentary

- Directed by: Paul Haesaerts
- Release date: 1949
- Running time: 21 min
- Country: Belgium
- Language: Belgian

Visit to Picasso ("Bezoek aan Picasso") is a short Belgian documentary film from 1949 about painter Pablo Picasso, directed by Belgian filmmaker Paul Haesaerts. In an effort to capture the nature of Picasso's creative process, Paul Haesaerts asked the Spanish painter to apply his magical brushstrokes to large glass plates as Haesaerts filmed from the other side. This film actually predated the more famous art film The Mystery of Picasso (1956) by Henri-Georges Clouzot, in which Picasso painted on large transparent canvases as the director filmed from the other side.

The filming took place in Picasso's studio in Vallauris.

In 1951, Visit to Picasso was nominated for best documentary by the British Academy of Film and Television Arts (BAFTA).

== Plot ==
Haesaerts shows opening images of Picasso books, then switches to a series of works by the artist in chronological order. Then the artist paints and sculpts art works.
