= Suzanne Gabriello =

French singer and actress

- Born: Suzanne Yvonne Henriette Marie Galopet; 24 January 1932; Paris, France
- Died: 9 August 1992 (aged 60)
- Other name: Zizou
- Occupations: singer, actress
- Known for: comic chanson and parodies
- Spouses: Guy Lauzin, Michel Dubaile
- Partner: Jacques Brel
- Children: 1 son, 2 daughters
- Father: André Gabriello

Suzanne Gabriello (24 January 1932 – 9 August 1992), born Suzanne Yvonne Henriette Marie Galopet and also known as Zizou, was a French singer and actress. She animated television programs for young people and presented contests on French television. Suzanne Gabriello was one of the partners of Jacques Brel.

== Biography ==
Suzanne Gabriello was born in Paris in 1932. She was the daughter of French actor and comedian André Gabriello, whom she followed into show business. In 1955, she was an emcee, storyteller and singer, forming the trio Les Filles à Papa with two other daughters of famous cabaret performers: Françoise Dorin and Pierrette Souplex.

During a tour organized by Jacques Canetti, she met the Belgian chansonnier Jacques Brel, who was already married. They had a turbulent relationship over the next five years, including numerous separations and reconciliations. In her capacity as an announcer at the Olympia in Paris, she lobbied for Brel to perform at the Music Hall and announced it herself at one of his early concerts. According to Gabriello, Brel wrote his song "Ne me quitte pas" for her, and sang it to her in the presence of friends. Brel later contradicted her, calling the song "the story of an asshole and a failure. It has nothing to do with any woman."

Gabriello specialized in comic chanson and parodies. She parodied Georges Brassens, Enrico Macias, Jean Ferrat, Guy Mardel, and Nino Ferrer, among others. Later she shifted to acting and appeared in eight feature films.

Gabriello was married twice, once to director Guy Lauzin (with whom she had a daughter), and once to the singer Michel Dubaile (with whom she had a son and second daughter). Gabriello died of cancer on 9 August 1992 at Pitié-Salpêtrière Hospital in Paris, at the age of 60.

== Selected filmography ==
- Sweet Madness (1951)
- Quintuplets in the Boarding School (1953)

== Bibliography ==
- (in French) Cinémémorial
- Suzanne Gabriello at IMDb
