= Ne me quitte pas =

1959 single by Jacques Brel

Single by Jacques Brel

from the album La Valse à mille temps
- Language: French
- English title: Don't leave me
- Published: 1959
- Released: 1959
- Recorded: 11 September 1959
- Genre: Chanson
- Length: 3:52
- Label: Philips
- Songwriter: Jacques Brel

"Ne me quitte pas" ("Don't leave me") is a 1959 song by the Belgian singer-songwriter Jacques Brel. It has been covered in the original French by many artists, and has also been translated into and performed in many other languages. A well-known adaptation, with English lyrics by Rod McKuen, is "If You Go Away".

== Background ==
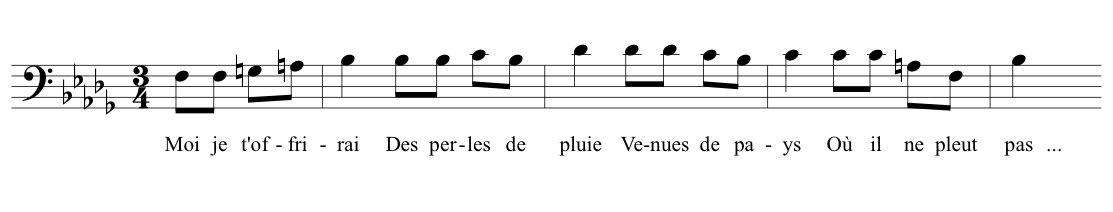
Moi, je t'offrirai des perles de pluie venues de pays où il ne pleut pas

"Ne me quitte pas" is considered by some as "Brel's ultimate classic". It was written after Brel's mistress "Zizou" (Suzanne Gabriello) threw him out of her life. Zizou was pregnant with Brel's child, but Brel refused to acknowledge the child as his own. Zizou later had an illegal abortion against Brel's wishes due to his actions. Brel first recorded the song on 11 September 1959, and it was released on his fourth album La Valse à mille temps later that year. It was published by Warner-Chappell Publishing. In 1961 a Dutch-language version sung by Brel was released on the Philips label; entitled "Laat me niet alleen", with lyrics by Ernst van Altena, it was the B-side to the Dutch-language version of "Marieke". Brel recorded "Ne me quitte pas" again as the title track of his 1972 album.

In a 1966 interview, Brel said that "Ne me quitte pas" was not a love song, but rather "a hymn to the cowardice of men" and the degree to which they were willing to humiliate themselves, though he claimed to have known that it would give pleasure to women who assumed it was a love song.

The lyric "Moi, je t'offrirai des perles de pluie venues de pays où il ne pleut pas" ("I'll offer you rain pearls from lands where it does not rain") is sung to a theme adapted from the second part of Franz Liszt's Hungarian Rhapsody No. 6.

== Johnny Hallyday version ==
"Ne me quitte pas / La garce"

Single by Johnny Hallyday

from the album Johnny Hallyday au Zénith
- B-side: "La garce"
- Released: 30 November 1984
- Venue: Zénith Paris
- Length: 5:25
- Label: Philips
- Songwriter: Jacques Brel

Johnny Hallyday singles chronology
| "Rien à personne" (1984) | "Ne me quitte pas" / "La garce" (1984) | "Le Chanteur abandonné" (1985) |

French singer Johnny Hallyday released a live version of this song as a single in November 1984. It was recorded during his performances at Le Zénith in Paris. The song was part of his 1984 album Johnny Hallyday au Zénith.

=== Critical reception ===
Alain Wodrascka in his 2008 book Johnny Hallyday: les adieux du rock'cœur notes how Hallyday put in his 1984 cover of Jacques Brel's "Ne me quitte pas" his special vocal qualities, i.e. his vocals that are "full of sensuality and expression of physical strength of an indestructible man, who sings as if making love".

=== Track listing ===
7" single Philips 880 504-7

Side 1. "Ne me quitte pas" (5:25)

Excerpt from the album Zénith no. 824 045-2
Arrangement: Éric Bouad

Side 2. "La garce" (Studio Version) (4:56)

Arrangement: Éric Bouad

== Other versions ==
English

The pop standard "If You Go Away", with lyrics by Rod McKuen, has been covered by many artists including Ray Charles. Different lyrics by Momus, closer to those of the original, render the song as "Don't Leave", added to all reissues of his 1986 album Circus Maximus. American duo the Black Veils translate the song as "Don't Leave Me" on their 2009 album Troubadours, which includes translations of six other French chansons. Sung by Holcombe Waller in Ryan Trecartin's "Sibling Topics (section a)" at 23:10.

== In popular culture ==
The song was used in season 1 episode 19 of the critically acclaimed TV show Person of Interest and in the final episode of Mr. Robot. It was also used in season 1 finale of The Leftovers. "Ne Me Quitte Pas" was used by Spanish filmmaker Pedro Almodóvar in his sixth film, Law of Desire (1987), in a striking performance by Brazilian singer Maysa Matarazzo. A parody of the song and the singer, as the archetypal chansonnier, was performed by Italian actor Gigi Proietti. Claudio Corneiro performed a clown act with this song in Cirque du Soleil's Varekai. It is also the name of an episode in the series Ramy.
