= Return to Life (film) =

1949 film

- Film poster
- Directed by: Georges Lampin; André Cayatte; Henri-Georges Clouzot; Jean Dréville
- Written by: Charles Spaak
- Produced by: Jacques Roitfeld
- Cinematography: Nicolas Hayer; Louis Page
- Release date: 14 November 1949
- Running time: 120 minutes
- Country: France
- Language: French

Return to Life (French: Retour à la vie) is a 1949 French drama portmanteau film in five parts directed by Georges Lampin, André Cayatte, Henri-Georges Clouzot and Jean Dréville (who directed the last two parts). It was entered into the 1949 Cannes Film Festival.

== Cast ==
- Paul Azaïs as the captain
- Bernard Blier as Gaston
- Jean Brochard as the Hotel tender
- Léonce Corne as Virolet
- Janine Darcey as Mary
- Max Elloy as the old barman
- Louis Florencie as the chief of police
- Paul Frankeur as the maire
- Jacques Hilling as a soldier
- Louis Jouvet as Jean Girard
- Léon Larive as Jules, the guard
- Héléna Manson as Simone
- Marie-France Plumer as Aunt Berth
- Noël-Noël as René
- Jeanne Pérez as the mother
- François Périer as Antoine
- Serge Reggiani as Louis, the husband of the young German
- Patricia Roc as Lieutenant Evelyne
- Noël Roquevert as the commander
- Maurice Schutz as the old man

== See also ==
- Henri-Georges Clouzot filmography
