= The Faceless Enemy =

1946 film

- Directed by: Robert-Paul Dagan; Maurice Cammage
- Written by: René Wheeler
- Based on: The Faceless Enemy by Stanislas-André Steeman
- Produced by: Paul Guien; Maurice Saint-Lou
- Starring: Louise Carletti; Frank Villard; Jean Tissier
- Cinematography: Paul Cotteret
- Edited by: Tonka Taldy
- Music by: Marcel Stern
- Production company: Stella Productions
- Distributed by: Cinelde
- Release date: 9 October 1946
- Running time: 105 minutes
- Country: France
- Language: French

The Faceless Enemy (French: L'ennemi sans visage) is a 1946 French crime film directed by Robert-Paul Dagan and Maurice Cammage and starring Louise Carletti, Frank Villard and Jean Tissier. It was based on the novel of the same title by Stanislas-André Steeman. It featured his long-running detective Inspector Wens. The film's sets were designed by the art director Marcel Magniez.

== Synopsis ==
A professor needs to do experiments on a living body, and so he is assigned a condemned man. However soon the scientist is found dead and the convict has escaped. Inspector Wens takes over the case.

== Cast ==
- Louise Carletti as Arlette
- Frank Villard as Inspecteur Wens / Inspector Wens
- Roger Karl as Le professeur Artus / Professor Artus
- Jean Tissier as Tiburce Artus
- Jean Témerson as Hector / Le valet / Hector - the butler
- Maurice Lagrenée as Clarence Jude
- André Fouché as Maxime Artus
- Jim Gérald as Ramshow
- Denyse Réal as L'infirmière
- Huguette Montréal as Andrée
- Eugène Yvernès as Le chauffeur
- Jean Berton as Le commissaire
- Paul Delauzac as Le docteur

== Bibliography ==
- Goble, Alan. The Complete Index to Literary Sources in Film. Walter de Gruyter, 1999.
- Hardy, Phil. The BFI Companion to Crime. A&C Black, 1997.
