= The 13th Letter =

1951 film by Otto Preminger

- Theatrical release poster
- Directed by: Otto Preminger
- Screenplay by: Howard Koch
- Based on: Le Corbeau by Louis Chavance
- Produced by: Otto Preminger
- Starring: Linda Darnell; Charles Boyer; Michael Rennie; Constance Smith
- Cinematography: Joseph LaShelle
- Edited by: Louis R. Loeffler
- Music by: Alex North
- Production company: 20th Century Fox
- Distributed by: 20th Century Fox
- Release dates: January 19, 1951 (United States); February 21, 1951 (New York); February 19, 1951 (Los Angeles)
- Running time: 85 minutes
- Country: United States
- Language: English
- Budget: $1,075,000

The 13th Letter is a 1951 American mystery film noir directed by Otto Preminger and starring Linda Darnell, Charles Boyer, Michael Rennie and Constance Smith. The film is a remake of the French film Le corbeau (The Raven, 1943), directed by Henri-Georges Clouzot. It was filmed on location in Quebec, Canada.

== Plot ==
Doctor Pearson, who works at a hospital in Quebec, Canada, receives a series of poison-pen letters. More letters, all signed with the mysterious picture of a feather, are delivered to others in the small town. Cora Laurent, the wife of Dr. Laurent, receives a letter accusing her of having an affair with Pearson. Another letter informs shell-shocked veteran Mr. Gauthier that he is dying of cancer, causing him to commit suicide. The townsfolk begin pointing fingers at all possible suspects.

== Cast ==
- Linda Darnell as Denise Tourneur
- Charles Boyer as Dr. Laurent
- Michael Rennie as Dr. Pearson
- Constance Smith as Cora Laurent
- Françoise Rosay as Mrs. Gauthier
- Judith Evelyn as Sister Marie Corbin
- Guy Sorel as Robert Helier
- June Hedin as Rochelle Turner

== Reception ==
In a contemporary review for The New York Times, critic Bosley Crowther called the film "a moderately intriguing mystery" and contrasted it with Le corbeau: "[P]lainly the morbid cynicism that ran through that notorious French film and implied a pervasion of corruption among the small-town middle classes in France is not in this 'poison-pen' fable ... Perhaps that omission is fortunate—at least, for those who would enjoy a mystery film—for 'Le Corbeau' was so venomous and gloomy that it was well-nigh ridiculous. The dust of demoralization that rose from the lengthy parade of small-town connivers and neurotics was so dense and oppressive that it was hard to observe ... Mr. Koch and Mr. Preminger have been hasty to do something about that. ... [T]hey have dropped the implications of a whole pattern of community disease and let it appear that just a couple of queerish people in a conspicuously religious town are in bad health."
