= Louis Chavance =

French screenwriter (1907–1979)

- Born: 24 December 1907; Paris, France
- Died: 1979 (aged 71–72)
- Occupations: Writer, editor, assistant director
- Years active: 1932–1961 (film)

Louis Chavance (1907–1979) was a French screenwriter. He also worked occasionally as a film editor and assistant director. He is best known for his screenplay for Le Corbeau which he first wrote in 1933 although the film was not made for another decade.

== Selected filmography ==
=== Screenwriter ===
- The Trump Card (1942)
- La Nuit fantastique (1942)
- The Phantom Baron (1943)
- Le Corbeau (1943)
- A Lover's Return (1946)
- The Last Penny (1946)
- The Unknown Singer (1947)
- Under the Cards (1948)
- Summer Storm (1949)
- The Man Who Returns from Afar (1950)
- The 13th Letter (1951)
- Tom Toms of Mayumba (1955)

=== Editor ===
- L'Atalante (1934)
- The Duraton Family (1939)

== Bibliography ==
- Matthew Bernstein & Gaylyn Studlar. Visions of the East: Orientalism in Film. Rutgers University Press, 1997.
