= Paul Haesaerts =

Belgian artist

- Born: Paul Haesaerts; 15 February 1901; Boom, Belgium
- Died: 31 January 1974 (aged 72); Brussels, Belgium
- Other name: Paul Haesaerts
- Occupations: architect, filmmaker, etcher, painter, screenwriter, illustrator

Paul Haesaerts (15 February 1901 – 31 January 1974) was a multi talented Belgian artist.

Born as Pauwel Helena Alfons Haesaerts, son of Benjamin Adolf Jan Baptist Haesaerts and Emma Philomena Spillemaeckers.

As an artist he worked as an architect, filmmaker, etcher, painter, screenwriter, carpet designer and illustrator. He was a member of both Les Compagnons de l'Art and La Jeune Peinture Belge, both artistic organisations based in Belgium. In 1930 he founded the journal Les Beaux-Arts, with his brother Luc Haesaerts.

Haesaerts began exploring how he could present art criticism through the medium of film after the end of World War II. He released his first film in 1948. Focused on artist Peter Paul Rubens, Haesaerts created it in collaboration with Henri Storck.

His short film Visit to Picasso (1949) was awarded at the New York Film Festival in 1950 and was nominated for the BAFTA award for best documentary in 1951.

== Filmography ==
- "Rubens" (1948)
- Van Renoir tot Picasso (1948, From Renoir to Picasso, De Renoir a Picasso)
- Visit to Picasso (1949)
