= The Mystery of Picasso =

- Directed by: Henri-Georges Clouzot
- Screenplay by: Henri-Georges Clouzot
- Produced by: Henri-Georges Clouzot
- Starring: Pablo Picasso; Henri-Georges Clouzot
- Cinematography: Claude Renoir
- Edited by: Henri Colpi; Henri-Georges Clouzot
- Music by: Georges Auric
- Production company: Filmsonor
- Release date: 18 May 1956 (France)
- Running time: 75 min
- Country: France
- Language: French

The Mystery of Picasso (French: Le mystère Picasso) is a 1956 French documentary film directed by Henri-Georges Clouzot. In it, the painter Pablo Picasso produces 20 drawings and paintings, at first using inks that bleed through the paper on which he is drawing, with the act of creation filmed in real-time from the backside of the easel, and later using oil paints, with Clouzot employing a stop-motion-like effect to depict the development and modification of the works. The film begins with Picasso creating simple marker drawings in black and white, and he gradually progresses to full-scale collages and oil paintings.

The pieces created before the camera were supposedly subsequently destroyed so they would only exist on film, but there are reports that some survived.

== Release ==
The Mystery of Picasso was released in France on 18 May 1956. It won the Special Jury Prize at the 1956 Cannes Film Festival and was shown out of competition at the 1982 Festival.

== See also ==
- Visit to Picasso – A short Belgian documentary from 1949 that employed a similar method to film Picasso at work. In both films, the artist was filmed from the backside of his work surface, but, in the earlier film, he painted on glass.
