= Henri-Georges Clouzot =

French film director (1907–1977)

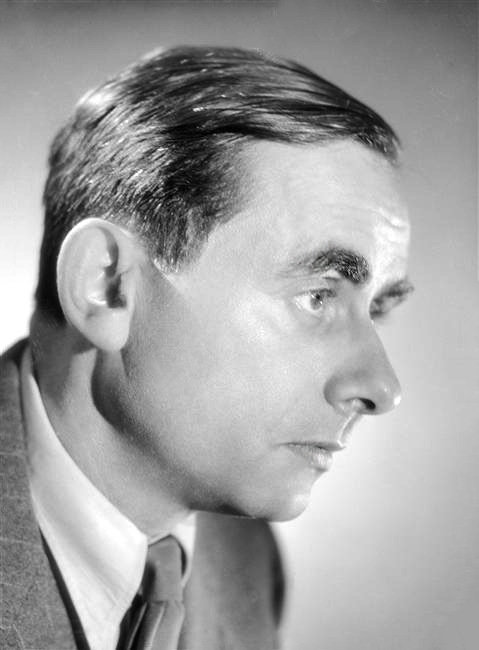
- Clouzot in 1947
- Born: 20 November 1907; Niort, France
- Died: 12 January 1977 (aged 69); Paris, France
- Occupations: Film director; screenwriter; film producer
- Years active: 1931–1968
- Spouses: Véra Gibson-Amado (m. 1950; died 1960) Inès de Gonzalez (m. 1963)

Henri-Georges Clouzot (French: [ɑ̃ʁi ʒɔʁʒ kluzo]; 20 November 1907 – 12 January 1977) was a French film director, screenwriter, and producer. He is best remembered for his work in the thriller film genre, having directed The Wages of Fear (1953) and Les Diaboliques (1955), which are critically recognized as among the greatest films of the 1950s. He also directed documentary films, including The Mystery of Picasso (1956), which was declared a national treasure by the government of France.

Clouzot was an early fan of the cinema and, desiring a career as a writer, moved to Paris. He was later hired by producer Adolphe Osso to work in Berlin, writing French-language versions of German films. After being fired from UFA studio in Nazi Germany due to his friendship with Jewish producers, Clouzot returned to France, where he spent years bedridden after contracting tuberculosis. Upon recovering, he found work in Nazi-occupied France as a screenwriter for the German-owned company Continental Films. At Continental, Clouzot wrote and directed films that were very popular. His second film Le Corbeau drew controversy over its harsh look at provincial France, and he was fired from Continental before its release. As a result of his association with Continental, he was barred by the French government from filmmaking until 1947.

After the ban was lifted, Clouzot reestablished his reputation and popularity in France during the late 1940s with successful films including Quai des Orfèvres. After the release of his comedy film Miquette, Clouzot married Véra Gibson-Amado, who would star in his next three feature films. In the early and mid-1950s, Clouzot drew acclaim from international critics and audiences for The Wages of Fear and Les Diaboliques; both films would serve as source material for remakes decades later. After the release of La Vérité, his wife Véra died of a heart attack, and Clouzot's career suffered due to depression, illness and new critical views of films from the French New Wave.

Clouzot's career became less active in later years, limited to a few television documentaries and two feature films in the 1960s. He wrote several unused scripts in the 1970s and died in Paris in 1977.

== Life and career ==
=== Early years ===
Henri-Georges Clouzot was born in Niort, Deux-Sèvres, to mother Suzanne Clouzot and father Georges Clouzout, a bookstore owner. He was the first of three children in a middle-class family. Clouzot showed talent by writing plays and playing piano recitals. His father's bookstore went bankrupt, and the family moved to Brest where Georges Clouzout became an auctioneer. In Brest, Henri-Georges Clouzot went to Naval School, but was unable to become a Naval Cadet due to his myopia. At the age of 18, Clouzot left for Paris to study political science. Whilst living in Paris, he became friends with several magazine editors. His writing talents led him to theater and cinema as a playwright, lyricist and adaptor-screenwriter. The quality of his work led producer Adolphe Osso to hire him and send him to Germany to work in Studio Babelsberg in Berlin, translating scripts for foreign-language films shot there.

=== Career ===
==== Screenwriting career (1931–1942) ====
Throughout the 1930s Clouzot worked by writing and translating scripts, dialogue and occasionally lyrics for over twenty films. While living in Germany, he saw the films of F. W. Murnau and Fritz Lang and was deeply influenced by their expressionist style. Clouzot made his first short film, La Terreur des Batignolles, from a script by Jacques de Baroncelli. The film is a 15-minute comedy with three actors. Film historian and critic Claude Beylie reported this short was "surprisingly well made with expressive use of shadows and lighting contrasts that Clouzot would exploit on the full-length features he would make years later". Clouzot's later wife, Inès de Gonzalez, said in 2004 that La Terreur des Batignolles added nothing to Clouzot's reputation. In Berlin, Clouzot saw several parades for Adolf Hitler and was shocked at how oblivious he felt France was to what was happening in Germany. In 1934, Clouzot was fired from UFA Studios for his friendship with Jewish film producers such as Adolphe Osso and Pierre Lazareff.

In 1935, Clouzot was diagnosed with tuberculosis and was sent first to Haute-Savoie and then to Switzerland, where he was bedridden for nearly five years in all. Clouzot's time in the sanatorium would be very influential on his career. While bedridden, Clouzot read constantly and learned the mechanics of storytelling to help improve his scripts. Clouzot also studied the fragile nature of the other people in the sanatorium. Clouzot had little money during this period, and was provided with financial and moral support by his family and friends. By the time Clouzot left the sanatorium and returned to Paris, World War II had broken out. French cinema had changed because many of the producers he had known had fled France to escape Nazism.

Clouzot's health problems kept him from military service. In 1939, he met actor Pierre Fresnay, who was already an established film star in France. Clouzot wrote the script for Fresnay's only directorial feature Le Duel, as well as two plays for him: On prend les mêmes, which was performed in December 1940, and Comédie en trois actes, which was performed in 1942. Despite writing scripts for films and plays, Clouzot was so poor that he resorted to trying to sell lyrics to French singer Édith Piaf, who declined to purchase them. In World War II, after France was invaded by Germany and subsequently during the German occupation, the German-operated film production company Continental Films was established in October 1940. Alfred Greven, the director of Continental, knew Clouzot from Berlin and offered him work to adapt stories of writer Stanislas-André Steeman. Clouzot felt uncomfortable working for the Germans, but was in desperate need of money and could not refuse Greven's offer. Clouzot's first film for Continental was the adaptation of Steeman's mystery novel Six hommes morts (Six Dead Men). Clouzot retitled the film Le Dernier des six, having been influenced by actress Suzy Delair while writing the script, allowing her to choose the name of the character she would play.

==== Early directorial work (1942–1947) ====
After the success of Le Dernier de six, Clouzot was hired as the head of Continental's screenwriting division. Clouzot began work on his second Steeman adaptation, which he would also direct, titled The Murderer Lives at Number 21. It starred Fresnay and Delair playing the same roles they had performed in Le Dernier de six. Released in 1942, the film was popular with audiences and critics. Clouzot's next film was Le Corbeau based on a true story about a woman who sent poison pen letters in 1922. Grevin was against Clouzot making this film, stating that topic was "dangerous". Le Corbeau would be the last film that Fresnay and Clouzot would work together on. Clouzot had used all possible means to try to anger the actor during the filming, and after he quarreled with Fresnay's wife, Yvonne Printemps, Fresnay and Clouzot broke off their friendship. Le Corbeau was a great success in France, with nearly 250,000 people having seen it in the first months of its initial release. Le Corbeau was released in 1943 and generated controversy from the right-wing Vichy regime, the left-wing Resistance press and the Catholic Church. The Catholic Church considered the film "painful and hard, constantly morbid in its complexity". The Vichy press dubbed it the antithesis of the Révolution nationale and demanded it be banned due to its immoral values. The anti-Nazi resistance press considered it Nazi propaganda because of its negative portrayal of the French populace. Two days before the release of Le Corbeau, Continental Films fired Clouzot.

After the liberation of France, Clouzot and several other directors were tried in court for collaborating with the Germans. For his sentence, Clouzot was forbidden from going on set of any film or from using a film camera for the rest of his life. Clouzot received letters of support from filmmakers and artists Jean Cocteau, René Clair, Marcel Carné and Jean-Paul Sartre, who were against the ruling. Clouzot's sentence was later shortened from life to two years. There is no official document making note of any apology or appeal. During his two-year banishment from filming, Clouzot worked with one of his supporters, Jean-Paul Sartre, who had been one of the first people to defend Le Corbeau.

==== Return to filmmaking and acclaim (1947–1960) ====
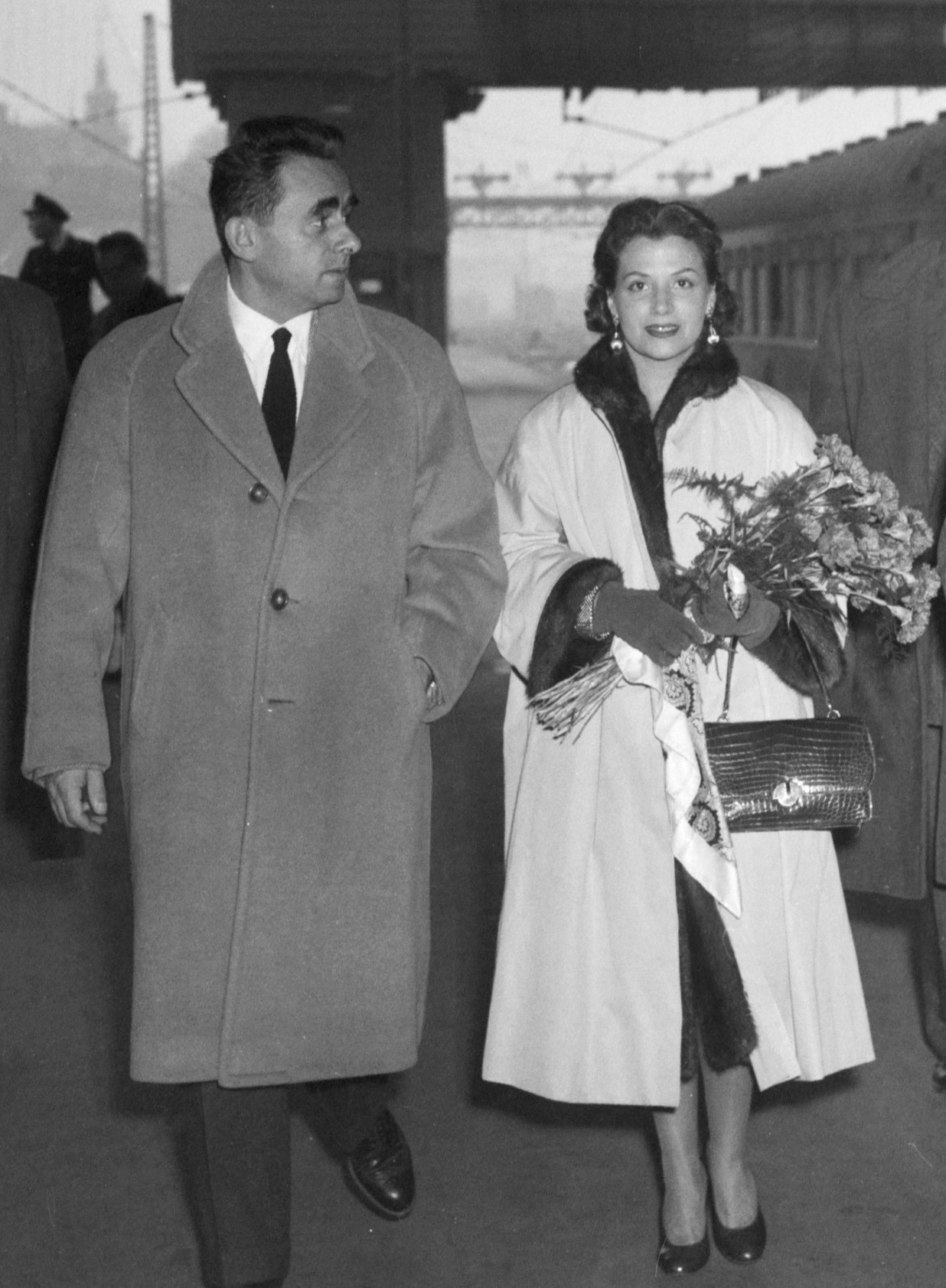
Henri-Georges and Vera Clouzot in 1953

After Clouzot's ban was lifted, he reestablished his reputation and popularity during the late 1940s with films such as Quai des Orfèvres and Manon. For Quai des Orfèvres, Clouzot asked the author Stanislas-André Steeman for a copy of his novel, Légitime défense, to adapt into a film. Clouzot started writing the script before the novel arrived for him to read. Quai des Orfèvres was released in 1947 and was the fourth most popular film in France, drawing 5.5 million spectators in that year. Clouzot directed and wrote two films that were released in 1949. For Manon, he wanted to cast unknown actors. He scoured schools to find an actress for the lead role, and chose 17-year-old Cécile Aubry after viewing over 700 girls. Manon was released in 1948 and was watched by 3.4 million filmgoers in France as well as winning the Golden Lion at the Venice Film Festival. Clouzot directed and wrote the short film Le Retour de Jean, which was part of the anthology film Return to Life. Le Retour de Jean was influenced by the short period when Clouzot lived in Germany in the early 1930s and stars Louis Jouvet as a survivor of a concentration camp who finds a wounded Nazi war criminal whom he interrogates and tortures. Clouzot's next film was the comedy Miquette et Sa Mère, which was a financial failure. During the film's production, Clouzot met Véra Gibson-Amado, whom he married on 15 January 1950. Clouzot and Véra took a film crew with them to Véra's homeland in Brazil for their honeymoon, where Clouzot made his first attempt at directing a documentary film. The Brazilian government took issue with Clouzot filming the poverty of people in the favelas rather than the more picturesque parts of Brazil. The film was never finished because the costs became too high. Clouzot became fascinated with the region and wrote a book, Le cheval des dieux, recounting his trip.

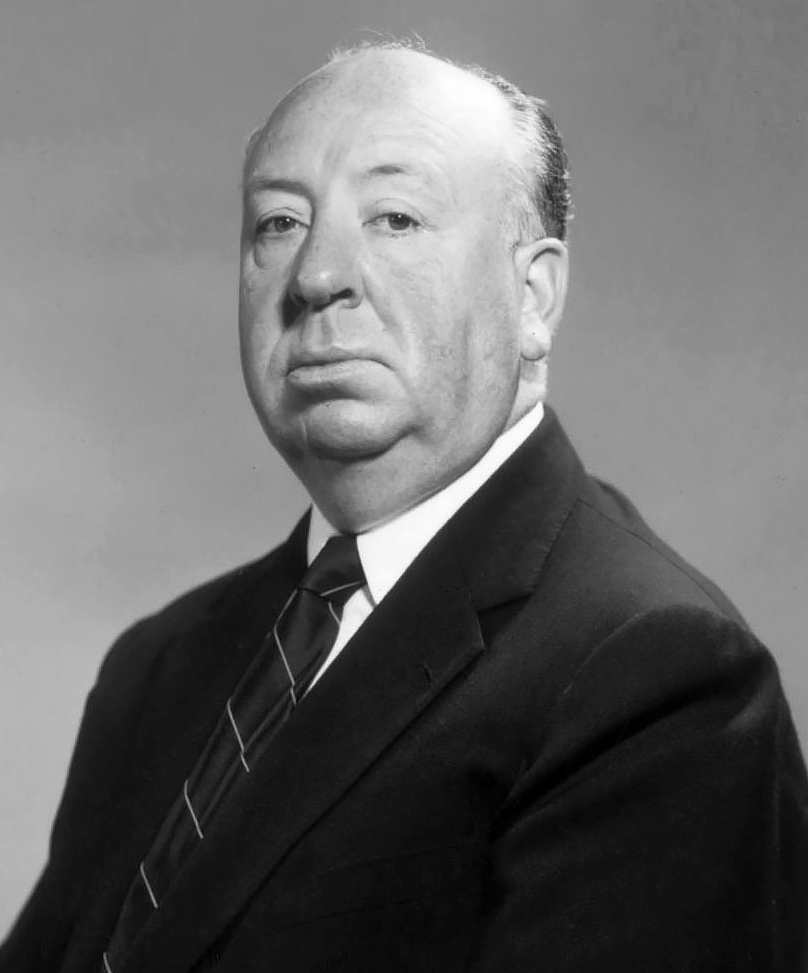
Clouzot bought the rights to Les Diaboliques which halted Alfred Hitchcock's attempt to purchase them.

Upon returning to France, he was offered a script written by Georges Arnaud, an expatriate living in South America who had written about his own experiences there. Clouzot found it easy to imagine the setting of the script and was very anxious to film Arnaud's story. He started writing the film, The Wages of Fear, with his brother, Jean Clouzot, who would collaborate with him on all his subsequent films under the name of Jérôme Geronimi. Production on The Wages of Fear lasted from 1951 to 1952. In order to gain as much independence as possible, Clouzot created his own production company called Véra Films, which he named after his wife. The sole female role in The Wages of Fear is played by her. Clouzot wrote the role specifically for his wife, as the character does not exist in the original novel. The Wages of Fear is about a South American town where a group of desperate men are offered money to drive trucks carrying nitroglycerin through rough terrain to put out an oil well fire. The Wages of Fear was the second most popular film in France in 1953 and was seen by nearly 7 million spectators. It won awards for Best Film and Best Actor (for Charles Vanel) at the Cannes Film Festival. Clouzot's next big hit was Les Diaboliques, whose screenplay he took away from director Alfred Hitchcock. Les Diaboliques involves the story of a cruel headmaster who brutalizes his wife and his mistress. The two women plot to murder him and dump his body in a swimming pool, but when the pool is drained, no corpse is found. In 1954, Les Diaboliques won the Louis Delluc Prize and the New York Film Critics Circle Award for best foreign film. In this early and mid-1950s period, with the films The Wages of Fear and Les Diaboliques, Clouzot came to be fully embraced by international critics and audiences. Both films were screened and reviewed in America as well as in France, and were rated among the best thrillers of the decade. In 1955, Clouzot directed the documentary The Mystery of Picasso, about the Spanish painter Pablo Picasso. The film follows Picasso drawing or painting 15 different works, all of which were intentionally destroyed following the film's production. Clouzot and Picasso were old acquaintances, having met when Clouzot was 14. The Mystery of Picasso won the Jury Prize at the Cannes Film Festival, but was a financial failure in France, being seen by only 37,000 filmgoers during its initial run in 1956. In 1984, the film was declared a national treasure by the government of France.

Clouzot's next feature film was Les Espions, which was released in 1957. Les Espions featured actors from around the world including Véra Clouzot, Curd Jürgens, Sam Jaffe and Peter Ustinov. Les Espions would be the last acting role for Clouzot's wife Véra, who had been suffering from severe heart problems since filming Les Diaboliques. Les Espions is set in a rundown sanitarium that is taken over by international spies. One of the spies claims to have invented a nuclear explosive device which attracts the attention of the Russian and American counterspies. Les Espions was not released in the United States and was a financial failure in France. Clouzot later admitted that he only liked the first two-thirds of Les Espions.

Producer Raoul Levy suggested Clouzot's next film should feature Brigitte Bardot as the lead actress. In response, Clouzot wrote the script for La Vérité. Bardot plays Dominique Marceau, who is on trial for the murder of her former boyfriend Gilbert Tellier. As her trial progresses, the relationship between Dominique and Gilbert becomes more finely shaped. Bardot later described La Vérité as her favorite of all the films she worked on. Released in 1960, La Vérité was the second most popular film in France with 5.7 million spectators and was Bardot's highest-grossing film. The film was nominated for the Academy Award for Best Foreign Language Film.

==== Later career and failing health (1960–1977) ====
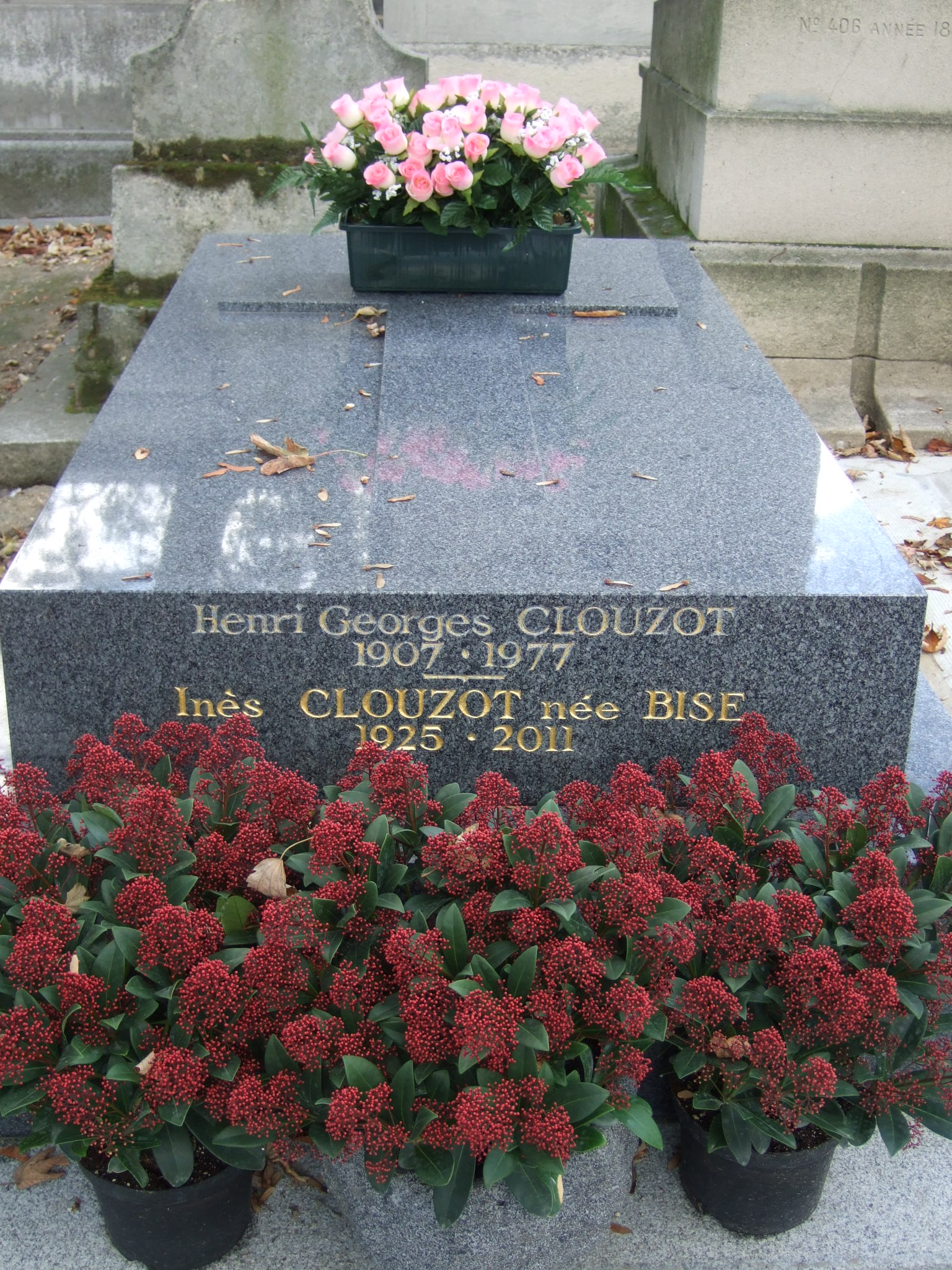
Henri-Georges Clouzot's tomb at the Montmartre Cemetery.

Although Clouzot's reputation had grown internationally, he lost notability in French cinema due to rise of the French New Wave. The New Wave directors refused to take Clouzot's thriller films seriously, and expressed their displeasure publicly through articles and reviews in the film criticism publication, Cahiers du cinéma. Clouzot took their criticism to heart, saying in the magazine Lui that he didn't find his films Les Diaboliques and Miquette et Sa Mère important or interesting anymore. The next film he worked on was L'Enfer, which was never completed. The film examines the sexual jealousy of a man towards his flirtatious wife, whose psychological state deforms everything with desire. Lead actor Serge Reggiani fell ill one week after shooting began and had to be replaced. Clouzot himself also became ill during production, which led doctors and insurance agents to order the production be stopped. Between 1965 and 1967, Clouzot filmed for French television five documentaries of Herbert von Karajan conducting Verdi's Requiem, Dvořák's New World Symphony, Schumann's 4th Symphony, Beethoven's 5th Symphony and Mozart's 5th Violin Concerto. After production finished on the documentaries, Clouzot was able to finance his final picture.

Clouzot's return to work reassured the doctors and insurers, and he returned to the film studio to make his final film La Prisonnière. The film began production in September 1967 and was halted when Clouzot fell ill and was hospitalized until April 1968. He began filming La Prisonnière again in August 1968. Clouzot incorporated stylistic elements of his aborted film L'enfer into La Prisonnière. La Prisonnière is about a woman who is introduced to a photographer who takes masochistic submissive pictures of young women. The woman volunteers herself as a model for these pictures and is surprised at her own pleasure in the activity. After finishing La Prisonnière, Clouzot's health grew worse. In the 1970s, he wrote a few more scripts without ever filming them, including a feature about Indochina. He also planned to direct a pornographic film in 1974 for Francis Micheline, but the film was abandoned. Clouzot's health grew worse and he required open-heart surgery in November 1976. On 12 January 1977 Clouzot died in his apartment while listening to The Damnation of Faust. Clouzot is buried beside Véra in the Montmartre Cemetery.

=== Personal life ===
In the late-1930s, Clouzot went to a cabaret show featuring entertainers Mistinguett and Suzy Delair at the "Deux Anes" cabaret. Clouzot waited for Delair at the stage door and after meeting her, the two became a romantic couple for the next 12 years. Clouzot had Delair star in two of his films, The Murderer Lives at Number 21 and Quai des Orfèvres. Delair eventually left Clouzot after working with him on Quai des Orfèvres.

Clouzot met his first wife Vera Clouzot through actor Léo Lapara, who had minor parts in Le Retour de Jean and Quai des Orfèvres. Véra met Clouzot after divorcing Lapara and while working as a continuity assistant on Clouzot's Miquette et Sa Mère. Clouzot named his production company after Véra and had her star in all three films made by the company: The Wages of Fear, Diabolique and Les Espions. Véra also contributed to the script of La Vérité. Véra Clouzot died of a heart attack shortly after the filming of La Vérité. Clouzot fell into a depression over her death. After her funeral, he moved to Tahiti, but returned to France in December 1960.

Clouzot met his second wife, Inès de Gonzalez, for the first time at a casting call for a film based on Vladimir Nabokov's Laughter in the Dark. In 1962, Clouzot met de Gonzalez again after she had returned from South America. In December 1963, Clouzot and Inès de Gonzalez married. In the 1960s, Clouzot converted to Roman Catholicism.

== Style ==
With the exception of the comedy film Miquette et sa mère, every directorial feature of Clouzot involves deception, betrayal and violent deaths. When basing screenplays on written work, Clouzot often changed the stories dramatically, using only key points of the original story. The author Stanislas-André Steeman, whom Clouzot worked with twice, said Clouzot would only "build something after having contemptuously demolished any resemblance to the original, purely for the ambition of effect". When writing for his own features, Clouzot created characters that were usually corrupt and spineless, with the capacity for both good and evil within them.

Clouzot was very demanding with his actors, and would often quarrel with them to get them in the mood he desired. Suzy Delair recalled that Clouzot slapped her, but said of it, "So what? He slapped others as well...He was tough but I'm not about to complain". Pierre Fresnay recalled that Clouzot "worked relentlessly, which made for a juicy spectacle...That's to say nothing for his taste of violence, which he never tried with me". When Clouzot worked with Brigitte Bardot, one scene required her character to drool and sleep. He offered her powerful sleeping pills, saying they were aspirin; this led to her stomach having to be pumped. Although he was harsh on his actors, he did not treat them fiercely off set. Delair recalled that off set there was an "innocence about him" that was not seen.

Clouzot biographer Marc Godin suggested Clouzot's life provides clues to understanding his style as a filmmaker. Clouzot was viewed by many of his collaborators as a pessimist, short-tempered, and almost always angry. Brigitte Bardot described Clouzot as "a negative being, forever at odds with himself and the world around him". His outlook on life is reflected in his own films that focus on the darker side of humanity.

== Legacy ==
Despite criticism following the arrival of the French New Wave, career retrospectives of Clouzot's work have been positive. Twenty years after his death, film critic Noël Herpe wrote in the French film journal Positif that "Les Diaboliques (just like Les Espions and La Verite) reveals a sterile and increasingly exaggerated urge to experiment with the powers of fiction". Film historian Philipe Pilard wrote, "There is no doubt that if Clouzot had worked for Hollywood and applied the formulas of U.S. studios, today he would be lauded by the very critics who choose to ignore him". Clouzot today is generally known for his thriller films The Wages of Fear and Diabolique. Clouzot's ability in the genre led to comparisons with Alfred Hitchcock. Clouzot respected Hitchcock's work, stating, "I admire him very much and am flattered when anyone compares a film of mine to his".

Several of Clouzot's films have been remade since their original releases. Director Otto Preminger adapted Le Corbeau into his 1951 film The 13th Letter. In 1977, the year of Clouzot's death, William Friedkin directed a remake of The Wages of Fear called Sorcerer. French director Claude Chabrol adapted Clouzot's script for L'Enfer in 1994 for a film likewise titled L'Enfer. In 1996, an American remake of Les Diaboliques was released under the title Diabolique, starring Sharon Stone.

== Filmography ==
- L'assassin habite... au 21 (The Murderer Lives at Number 21, 1942)
- Le corbeau (The Raven, 1943)
- Quai des orfèvres (Goldsmiths' Quay, 1947)
- Manon (1949)
- Miquette et sa mère (Miquette, 1950)
- Le salaire de la peur (The Wages of Fear, 1953)
- Les diaboliques (Diabolique, 1955)
- Le mystère Picasso (The Mystery of Picasso, 1956)
- Les espions (The Spies, 1957)
- La vérité (The Truth, 1960)
- La prisonnière (Woman in Chains, 1968)
