= The Murderer Lives at Number 21 =

1942 film

- Directed by: Henri-Georges Clouzot
- Screenplay by: Henri-Georges Clouzot; Stanislas-André Steeman
- Based on: L'assassin habite au 21; 1939 novel by Stanislas-André Steeman
- Produced by: Alfred Greven
- Starring: Suzy Delair; Pierre Fresnay; Noël Roquevert; Pierre Larquey; Jean Tissier
- Cinematography: Armand Thirard
- Edited by: Christian Gaudin
- Music by: Maurice Yvain
- Release date: 8 July 1942 (France)
- Running time: 83 minutes
- Country: France
- Language: French

The Murderer Lives at Number 21 (French: L'Assassin habite au 21) is a 1942 French comedy thriller film by director Henri-Georges Clouzot. Adapted by Belgian writer Stanislas-André Steeman and Clouzot from Steeman's 1939 book of the same title, it was Clouzot's debut feature film as a director. The film is about the hunt by detective Wens (Pierre Fresnay) for the murderer Monsieur Durand, who leaves calling cards and manages to be everywhere at once. With the aspiring singer Mila Malou (Suzy Delair), Wens follows clues to a seedy boarding house where he hopes to find the murderer.

The Murderer Lives at Number 21 was the fourth film written by Clouzot for the Nazi run film company Continental Films who made films to take the place of banned American films. Clouzot made several changes from the script including the characters Mila and Wens from his previous screenplay for Le dernier des six (1941). The film was released in France to critical acclaim.

== Plot ==
The Paris police are determined to stop a serial killer who leaves a calling card on his victims' bodies, with the name "Monsieur Durand". The case is assigned to Inspector Wenceslas Vorobeychik (known as Wens). Wen's mistress is the ditzy singer Mila Malou, who is seeking publicity to boost her struggling career and declares she will help him find the criminal.

Wens's first clue comes when a petty thief shows him a stack of theDurand calling cards that he found hidden in the attic of a boarding house at 21 Avenue Junot: the killer must be one of the tenants. Wens takes a room there, disguised as a Protestant minister. The other tenants are a quirky lot: Monsieur Colin makes and sells dolls of Durand, with blank faces; Doctor Linz is a former abortionist; Kid Robert is a blind former boxer; "Professor" Lalah-Poor is a fakir and stage magician, who picks pockets for fun and returns the items; another tenant is writing a mystery novel; another is interested in types of whistling; and so on.

As the murders continue, Colin, Linz, and Lalah-Poor are each arrested in succession, but each is freed when another Durand murder occurs while he is in jail. To celebrate their exoneration, the boarding house landlady schedules a party and concert in which various tenants will perform.

Just before the party, Wens deduces who committed the murders and asks Mila to drop hints that he will be making an arrest that night. In fact, all three suspects are guilty of different murders in the series, so that each would have an alibi for some of the crimes. They act together to capture Wens and take him to a nearby building, explaining cordially that they are going to kill him and deposit his body in a vat of quicklime so that it is never found. They will then return to the party before it is their turn to perform.

As a compliment to Wens for solving the case, they offer him the choice of which one of them will kill him, each showing his different weapon. Since they seem disposed to talk, Wens plays for time by asking which of the three murderers deserves credit for their ingenious technique of pretending there is only one killer. They tell the story but then fall to arguing about who deserves the principal credit, while Wens quietly looks on. At this point, Mila arrives with a large contingent of police and Wens is rescued.

== Cast ==
- Suzy Delair as Mila Malou
- Pierre Fresnay as Wens
- Noël Roquevert as Dr. Linz
- Pierre Larquey as Colin
- Jean Tissier as Prof. Lalah Poor

== Production ==
The Murderer Lives at Number 21 was the first feature film directed by Henri-Georges Clouzot and was the fourth screenplay he wrote for the Nazi-owned company Continental Films. The budget for the film was considered to be quite generous and included materials that were extravagant by pre-war standards. As American films were banned during the German occupation of France during World War II, Continental Films aimed at quality and commercial success in their pictures and produced films that were to take the place of the American films. The Murderer Lives at Number 21 is a thriller with light comedic elements, which was the style of most mystery films during the occupation.

Henri-Georges Clouzot was assisted by the story's original author Stanislas-André Steeman in writing the film. The film marked the second collaboration between the two, who both collaborated on The Last of the Six (1941) which was a previous screenplay by Clouzot and Steeman. Steeman was not happy with how Clouzot had handled either of the films. Clouzot made changes from the original story including changing the setting of the story from London to Paris. Clouzot also wrote in Wens and Mila Malou from Le Dernier des six to the script. Both Pierre Fresnay and Suzy Delair found Clouzot to be a demanding and even violent director. Delair recalled how Clouzot got his performance out of the actors, by stating that "He slapped me. So what? He slapped others as well...He was tough but I'm not about to complain". Fresnay recalled that Clouzot "worked relentlessly, which made for a juicy spectacle...That's to say nothing for his taste of violence, which he never tried with me".

== Release ==
The Murderer Lives at Number 21 was released in France on July 8, 1942. It was released in the United States in 1947.

On its initial release in France, The Murderer Lives at Number 21 was popular with critics and audiences. A reviewer from Le Miroir de l'Ecran noted the delighted reaction of the audience at the film's premiere, noting how "amusing and witty scenes alternate judiciously with more severe and dramatic ones" and that the film created a "clever cocktail of humor and drama". A reviewer from Ciné-mondial praised the directing of Clouzot, stating that he "has put the finishing touches on a production that is dense, concise, mobile, varied, all in the service of a rich imagination". In the United States, a reviewer for The New York Times wrote that "The Murderer Lives at Number 21, despite a wandering script that fails to tie up many loose ends, is good fun for whodunnit fans".

In 2013 the film received a DVD re-release from Eureka Entertainment as part of their Masters of Cinema series. Providing a 21st-century analysis, Bring The Noise UK reviewer Michael Dodd noted the "numerous brave little digs at the occupying Germans" present in the story. He particularly singled out a scene in which a criminal has his hands raised, only to have one arm lowered by Inspector Wens so that he may light a match on the man's neck, thus making the villain look as though he is performing a Nazi salute. "It is hard to believe that the strict German authorities missed the subtext of such a shot", he concluded "and the fact that he even dared to place it in the film at all is a testament to the character of Clouzot".
