= Alfred Greven =

German film producer (1897–1973)

Alfred Greven (9 October 1897—9 February 1973) was a German film producer. He is best known for his work during World War II, when he was head of the German-controlled French film company Continental Films.

== Life and career ==
In the 1930s, Greven was a producer at UFA where he worked with some French directors on multi-language film productions.

Greven is best known for his role during the German military administration in occupied France during World War II, when he was the managing director of Continental Films, the French film production company set up by Germany. In this capacity, Greven produced notable films by French directors including Henri-Georges Clouzot, Christian-Jaque, Henri Decoin, Maurice Tourneur and André Cayatte. Greven also created the distribution company Société de gestion et d'exploitation du cinéma, which bought and set up new cinemas in France.

Ironically Joseph Goebbels was dissatisfied with the high quality of Greven's work in France, because he thought Greven raised the level of French cinema and inspired national pride, which was not supposed to be his task. Goebbels wrote in his diary that the French had been content with "cheap trash", and he wished Greven would continue to provide them with that. Goebbels thought Greven's commitment to French cinema threatened the establishment of Germany as the dominant power in European culture, which he wanted to be analogous to how the United States dominated the American continents through its cinema.
