= Continental Films =

French film company

Continental Films was a German-controlled French film production company. It stood as the sole authorized film production organization in Nazi-occupied France.

Established in October 1940, it was entirely bankrolled by the German government, and headed by Alfred Greven in Paris, with its finances, production and distribution tightly integrated with the German film industry. Continental's first production was Who Killed Santa Claus? (L'Assassinat du père Noël, 1941). The firm gave Henri-Georges Clouzot his first directoral job for the comic thriller The Murderer Lives at Number 21 (L'Assassin habite au 21, 1942), which Clouzot also co-wrote. Continental released 30 features before ending production four years later. Its last release was Majestic Hotel Cellars (1944).

The film Safe Conduct (Laissez-passer, 2002) depicts life and work at Continental, based on the memoirs of director Jean Devaivre.

== Alfred Greven ==
The director of Continental Film was the German producer Alfred Greven, who was born in 1897 in Elberfeld and died in 1973 in Cologne. After leaving the Gymnasium he volunteered in September 1914 for the German Army. He fought at the Western Front in the infantry and was severely wounded. In 1917, he fought in the Luftstreitkräfte and was awarded the Iron Cross 1st and 2nd class.

After the war he started to work in the movie business in 1920, joining the Nazi Party in 1931. In 1934, he was head of the committee for film production in the Reichsfilmkammer. Some of the films he produced were The Old and the Young King, The Green Domino and The Man Who Was Sherlock Holmes. In 1940, Goebbels appointed him managing director of the newly established Continental Film, his direct superior being Max Winkler. Films Greven produced after the war include Bonjour Kathrin.
