= Touria Chaoui =

First female Moroccan to gain a pilot's license (1936–1959)

- ثريا الشاوي
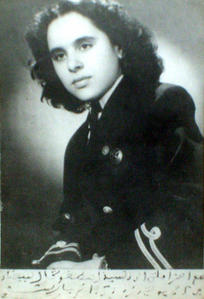
- Born: December 14, 1936; Fez, Morocco
- Died: March 1, 1956 (aged 19); Casablanca, Morocco
- Cause of death: Assassination
- Occupations: Aviator, actor
- Known for: First woman aviator in Morocco

Touria Chaoui (Arabic: ثريا الشاوي; December 14, 1936, Fez, Morocco – March 1, 1956) was the first female Moroccan and Maghrebi aviator at the age of fifteen.

== Early life ==
Chaoui was born on December 14, 1936, in Fez. Her father, Abdelwahed Chaoui, was an avant-garde journalist and theatre director and her mother was named Zina. She was one of two children, her brother Salah Chaoui is a renowned artist who resides in Vichy, France. In 1948, Chaoui's family moved from Fez to Casablanca to start a new life.

== Career ==
Chaoui's father enrolled her into an aviation school based in Tit Mellil, Morocco in 1950. The aviation school was reserved for the French forces occupying Morocco and little opportunity was presented to the native Moroccans, especially not to women. Her enrollment was contested by the school and much was done to deter her from participating in the aviation program. As there was no legislation preventing her from enrolling, the school reluctantly accepted her application with hopes that she would soon give up.

Despite this after a year of dedicated study and determination, Chaoui obtained her aviation license on 17 October 1951, at the age of 15. She became the first Moroccan and Maghrebi female pilot.

== Filmography ==
In 1946, at the age of thirteen, Chaoui played the role of a young Leila in The Seventh Door, a film by French director Andre Zwobada made in Fez.

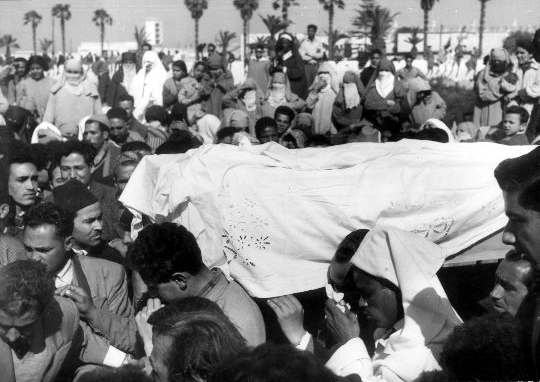
Funeral of Touria Chaoui

== Assassination ==
Touria Chaoui was killed on March 1, 1956, at the age of 19, while driving her younger brother Salah from school. Her killer was identified as Ahmed Touil, the leader of a secret organisation who assassinated several Moroccan political personalities. She is buried in the Ahl Fas cemetery, in Casablanca.

== See also ==
- Women in Morocco
- List of women's firsts
