= Léaud =

Léaud is a French surname. Notable people with the surname include:

- Jean-Pierre Léaud (born 1944), French actor
- Pierre Léaud (1909–1996), French screenwriter and assistant director
