= The Mystery of the Yellow Room (1949 film) =

1949 film

- Directed by: Henri Aisner
- Written by: Gaston Leroux (novel); Vladimir Pozner
- Produced by: Paul-Edmond Decharme
- Starring: Hélène Perdrière; Serge Reggiani; Pierre Renoir
- Cinematography: André Bac
- Edited by: Claude Nicole
- Music by: Guy Bernard
- Production company: Alcina
- Distributed by: Les Films Corona
- Release date: 15 June 1949
- Running time: 90 minutes
- Country: France
- Language: French

The Mystery of the Yellow Room (French: Le mystère de la chambre jaune) is a 1949 French mystery film directed by Henri Aisner and starring Hélène Perdrière, Serge Reggiani and Pierre Renoir. It is an adaptation of the 1907 novel The Mystery of the Yellow Room by Gaston Leroux. The film's sets were designed by the art director Max Douy. It was followed by a sequel The Perfume of the Lady in Black, released the same year.

There were other film adaptations of the novel, in 1919, 1930, and 2003.

== Plot ==
A young reporter solves a mystery crime. The fictional reporter is Joseph Rouletabille. He works on a complex, and seemingly impossible, crime in which the criminal appears to disappear from a locked room.

== Cast ==
- Hélène Perdrière as Mathilde Stangerson
- Serge Reggiani as Joseph Rouletabille
- Pierre Renoir as Professeur Stangerson
- Léonce Corne as Marquet
- Janine Darcey as Sylvie
- Arthur Devère as Père Jacques
- Marcel Herrand as Larsan
- Robert Le Fort as Le secrétaire
- Fabien Loris as Julien
- Germaine Michel as La cuisinière
- Gaston Modot as Arthur
- Lucien Nat as Robert Darzac
- Madeleine Barbulée as La femme de chambre

== See also ==
- Whodunit
