= Ninette Al-Abitbol =

Ninette Al-Abitbol نينيت الأبيتبول
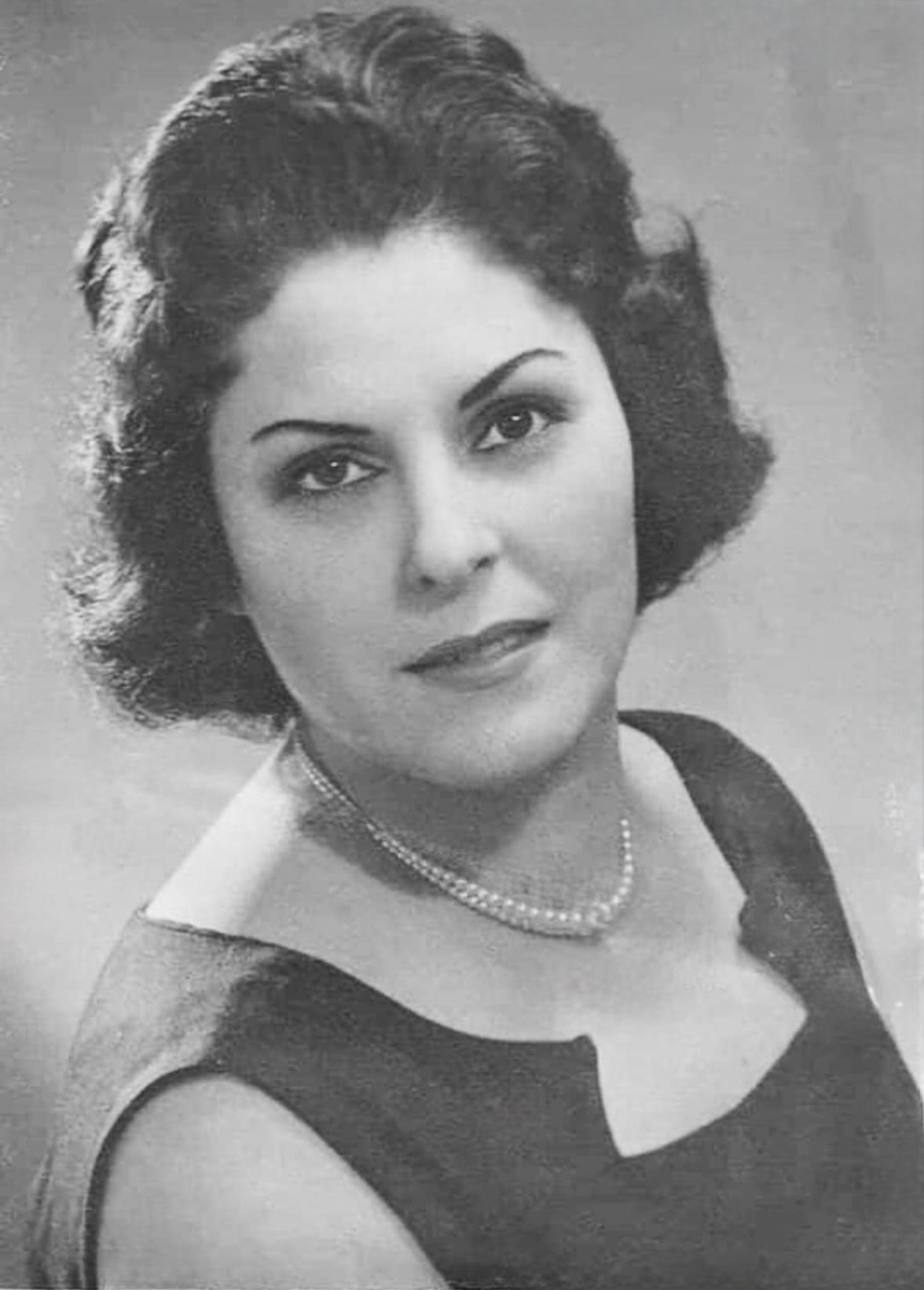

Background information
- Born: 1929; Tunis, French Tunisia
- Origin: Tunisia
- Died: January 12, 2005 (aged 75–76)
- Occupation(s): Singer, Actress
- Partner: Hédi Jouini

Ninette Al-Abitbol (Arabic: نينيت الأبيتبول, Hebrew: נינט אביטבול) better known by her stage name Wided (وداد, Arabic pronunciation:wɪdæd, meaning “Harmony”) was a Tunisian singer. She was the wife of Hédi Jouini.

Ninette came from the Jewish Tunisian community in El Hafsia and Lafayette neighborhoods of Tunis. She had four sons and two daughters.

== Career ==
Inspired by her favorite singer, Ninette adopted the stage name Wided, derived from the title of one of Umm Kulthum’s films.

In the 1946 French film La Septième Porte (The Seventh Door), directed by André Zwoboda and filmed in Morocco, Ninette and Hédi Jouini, are featured performing together.

In the documentary Papa Hédi – The Man Behind the Microphone, It was revealed that Ninette was discouraged by her husband from pursuing a music career.
