= Henry Dunant =

Swiss co-founder of the Red Cross (1828–1910)

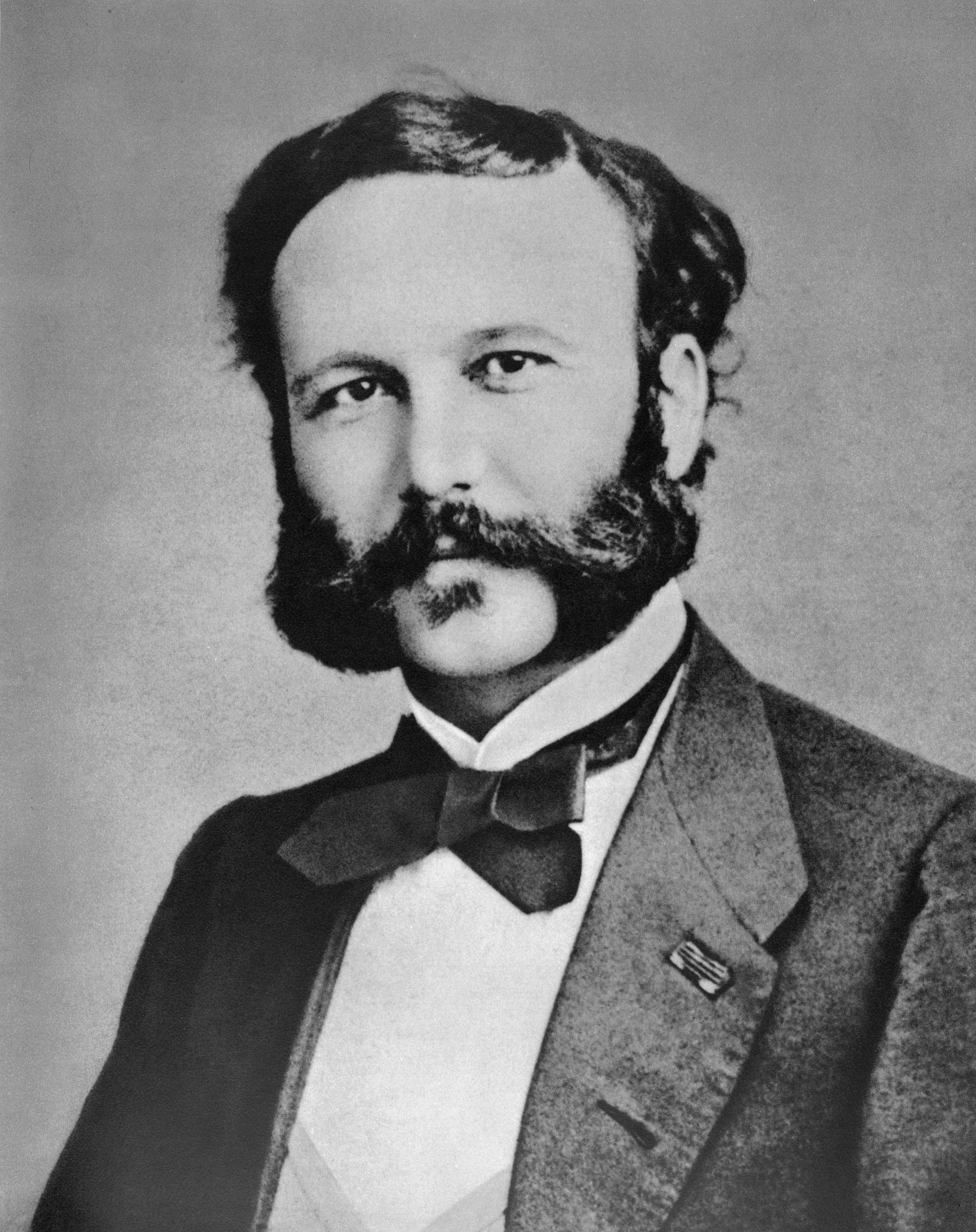
- Dunant c. 1860s
- Born: Jean-Henri Dunant; 8 May 1828; Geneva, Switzerland
- Died: 30 October 1910 (aged 82); Heiden, Switzerland
- Resting place: Friedhof Sihlfeld, Zürich-Wiedikon, Switzerland
- Citizenship: Swiss; French (from 1859)
- Occupations: Social businessman, writer
- Known for: Founder of the Red Cross
- Awards: Nobel Peace Prize (1901)

Henry Dunant (French pronunciation: [ɑ̃ʁi dynɑ̃]; born Jean-Henri Dunant; 8 May 1828 – 30 October 1910), also known as Henri Dunant, was a Swiss humanitarian, businessman, social activist, and co-founder of the Red Cross. His humanitarian efforts won him the first Nobel Peace Prize in 1901.

Dunant was born in Geneva to a devout Calvinist family and had business interests in French Algeria and Tunisia. In 1859, while on his way to petition Napoleon III, he witnessed the aftermath of the Battle of Solferino in northern Italy. Horrified by the suffering of the wounded and the lack of care they received, Dunant took the initiative to organize the local population in providing aid for the soldiers. After returning to Geneva, he recorded his experiences in the book A Memory of Solferino, in which he advocated the formation of an organization that would provide relief for the wounded without discrimination in times of war. In February 1863, Dunant was a member of a five-person committee that sought to put his plan into action, which in effect founded the organization that would become the International Committee of the Red Cross. A year later, he took part in a diplomatic conference organized by the Swiss government that led to the signing of the First Geneva Convention.

Dunant became embroiled in a business scandal in 1867 which resulted in his bankruptcy and expulsion from the International Committee. He spent the next decades in poverty and obscurity, living in various places across Europe before settling in the Swiss village of Heiden. In 1895, Dunant was rediscovered by a journalist, which brought him renewed attention and support, and in 1901 he was awarded the first Nobel Peace Prize alongside French pacifist Frédéric Passy. He died in Heiden in 1910.

== Early life and education ==
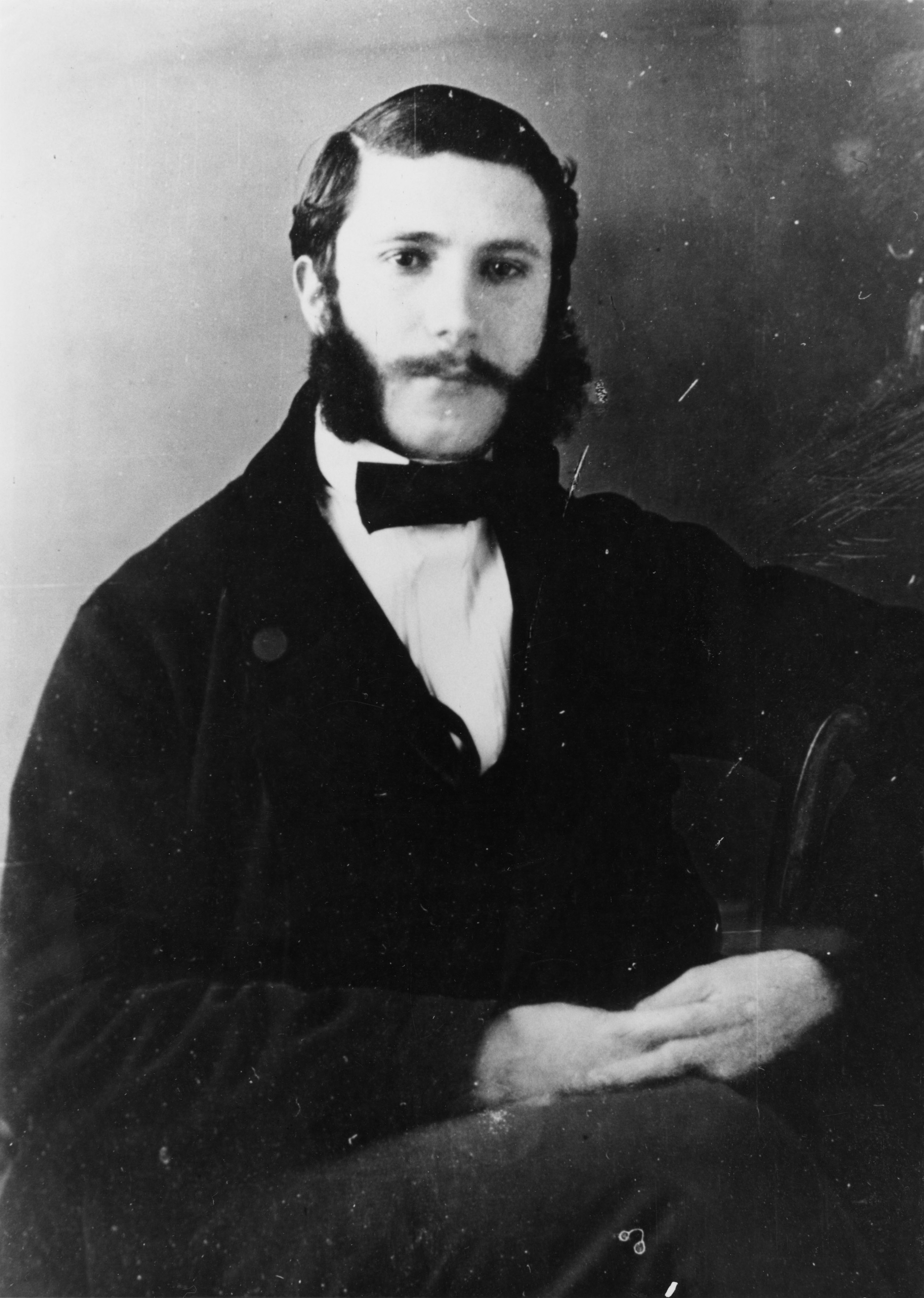
Henry Dunant in 1855

Dunant was born in Geneva, Switzerland, in 1828 as the first son of businessman Jean-Jacques Dunant and Antoinette Dunant-Colladon. His family was devoutly Calvinist and had significant influence in Geneva society. His parents stressed the value of social work, and his father was active in helping orphans and parolees, while his mother worked with the sick and the poor.

Dunant grew up during the period of religious awakening known as the Réveil, and at age 18 he joined the Geneva Society for Almsgiving. In the following year, together with friends, he founded the so-called "Thursday Association", a loose band of young men that met to study the Bible and help the poor, and he spent much of his free time engaged in prison visits and social work. On 30 November 1852, he founded the Geneva chapter of the YMCA and three years later he took part in the Paris meeting devoted to the founding of its international organization.

In 1849, at age 21, Dunant left the Collège de Genève due to poor grades and began an apprenticeship with the money-changing firm Lullin et Sautter. After its successful conclusion, he stayed as an employee of the bank.

== Algeria ==
In 1853, Dunant visited Algeria, Tunisia, and Sicily, on assignment with a company devoted to the "colonies of Setif" (Compagnie genevoise des Colonies de Sétif). Despite little experience, he successfully fulfilled the assignment. Inspired by the trip, he wrote his first book with the title An Account of the Regency in Tunis (Notice sur la Régence de Tunis), published in 1858.

In 1856, he created a business to operate in foreign colonies, and, after being granted a land concession by French-occupied Algeria, a corn-growing and trading company called the Financial and Industrial Company of Mons-Djémila Mills (Société financière et industrielle des Moulins des Mons-Djémila). However, the land and water rights were not clearly assigned, and the colonial authorities were not especially cooperative. As a result, in 1859 Dunant decided to appeal directly to French emperor Napoléon III, who was with his army in Lombardy at the time. France was fighting on the side of Piedmont-Sardinia against Austria in the Austro-Sardinian War. Napoleon's headquarters were located in the small city of Solferino. Dunant wrote a flattering book full of praise for Napoleon III with the intention to present it to the emperor and then travelled to Solferino to meet with him personally.

== Battle of Solferino ==
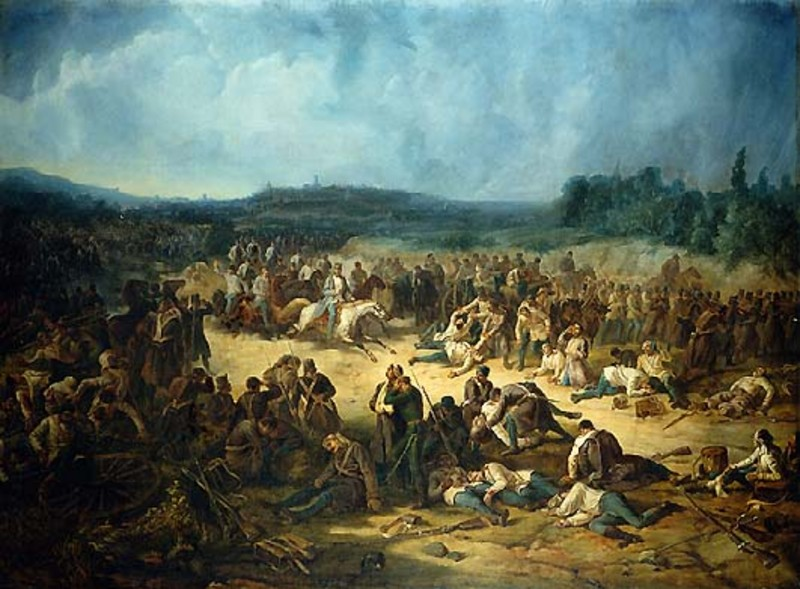
Henry Dunant at Solferino

Dunant arrived in Solferino on the evening of 24 June 1859, on the same day a battle between the two sides had occurred nearby. Forty thousand wounded, dying and dead remained on the battlefield, and there appeared to be little attempt to provide care. Shocked, Dunant himself took the initiative to organize the civilian population, especially the women and girls, to provide assistance to the injured and sick soldiers. They lacked sufficient materials and supplies, and Dunant himself organized the purchase of needed materials and helped erect makeshift hospitals. He convinced the population to service the wounded without regard to their side in the conflict as per the slogan "Tutti fratelli" (All are brothers) coined by the women of the nearby city Castiglione delle Stiviere. He also succeeded in gaining the release of Austrian doctors captured by the French and British.

== Red Cross founding history ==
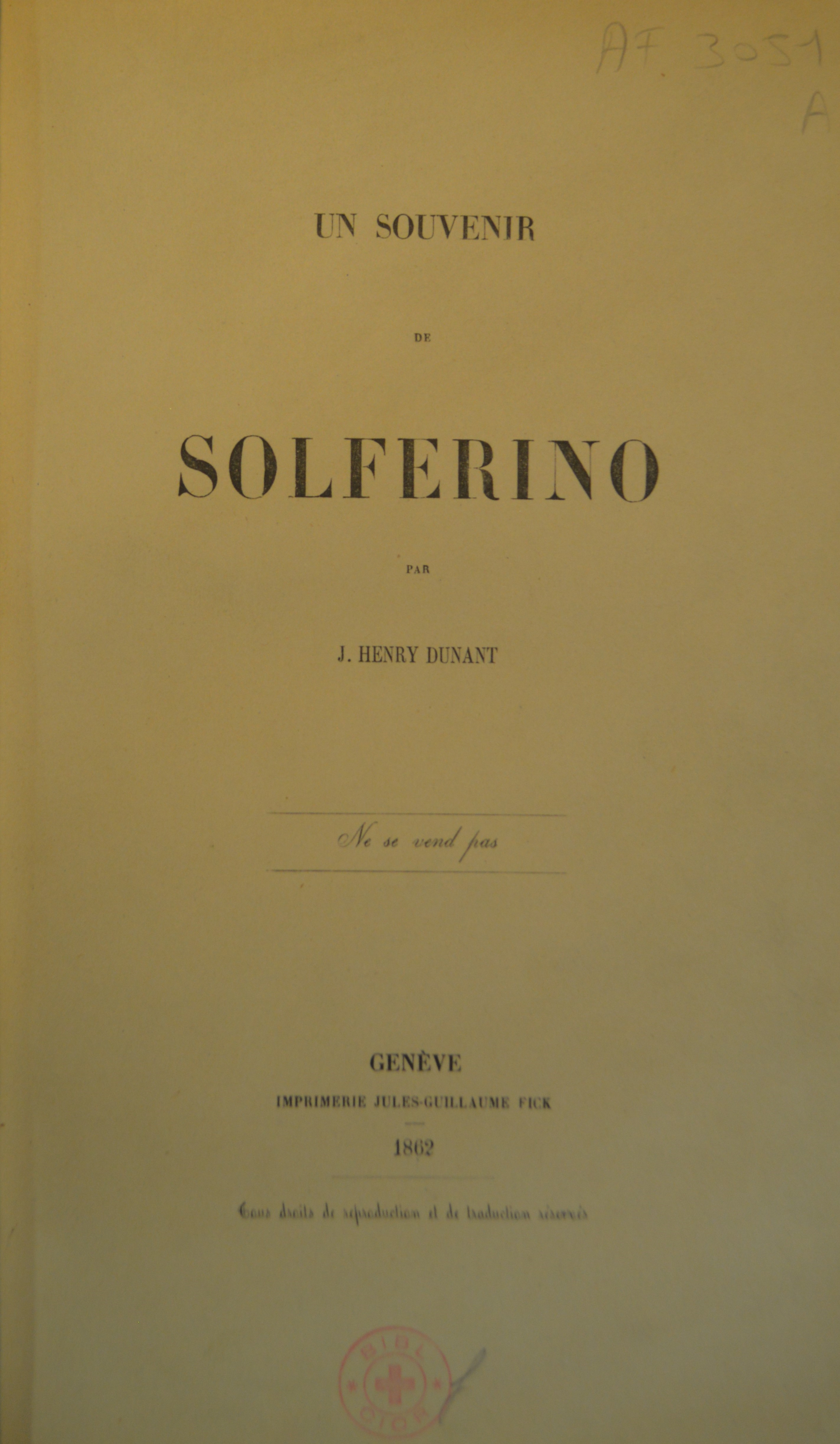
Original cover of A Memory of Solferino

After returning to Geneva early in July, Dunant decided to write a book about his experiences, which he titled Un Souvenir de Solferino (A Memory of Solferino). It was published in 1862 in an edition of 1,600 copies and was printed at Dunant's own expense. In the book, he described the battle, its costs, and the chaotic circumstances afterwards. He also developed the idea that in the future a neutral organization should exist to provide care to wounded soldiers. He distributed the book to many leading political and military figures in Europe.

Dunant also began to travel through Europe to promote his ideas. His book was largely positively received, and the President of the Geneva Society for Public Welfare, jurist Gustave Moynier, made the book and its suggestions the topic of the 9 February 1863 meeting of the organization. Dunant's recommendations were examined and positively assessed by the members. They created a five-person Committee to further pursue the possibility of their implementation and made Dunant one of the members. The others were Moynier, the Swiss army general Henri Dufour, and doctors Louis Appia and Théodore Maunoir. Their first meeting on 17 February 1863 is now considered the founding date of the International Committee of the Red Cross.

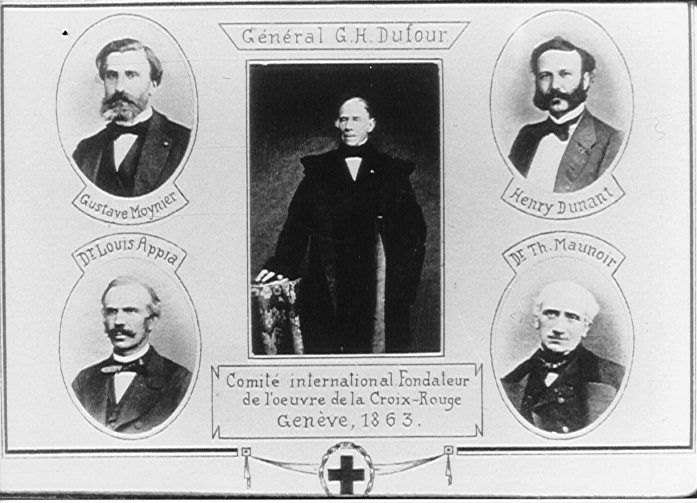
Drawing of the five founders of the International Committee

From early on, Moynier and Dunant had increasing disagreements and conflicts regarding their respective visions and plans. Moynier considered Dunant's idea to establish neutrality protections for care providers infeasible and advised Dunant not to insist upon this concept. However, Dunant continued to advocate this position in his travels and conversations with high-ranking political and military figures. This intensified the personal conflict between Moynier, who took a rather pragmatic approach to the project, and Dunant, who was the idealist among the five.

In October 1863, 14 states took part in a meeting in Geneva organized by the committee to discuss improving care for wounded soldiers. Dunant was a protocol leader during the meeting. A year later, on 22 August 1864, a diplomatic conference organized by the Swiss government led to the signing of the First Geneva Convention by 12 states. Dunant was in charge of organizing accommodation for the attendees.

== Forgotten period ==
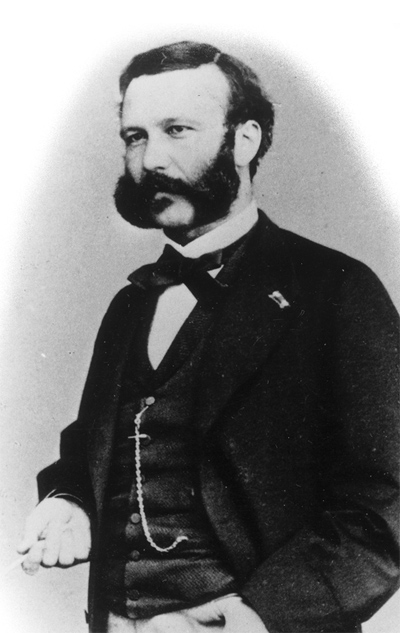

Dunant's businesses in Algeria had suffered. In April 1867, the bankruptcy of the financial firm Crédit Genevois led to a scandal involving Dunant. He declared bankruptcy. The social outcry in Geneva, a city deeply rooted in Calvinist traditions, also led to calls for him to separate himself from the International Committee. Already on 25 August 1867, he resigned as Secretary and, on 8 September 1867, he was fully removed from the committee. Dunant was condemned by the Geneva Trade Court on 17 August 1868 for deceptive practices in the bankruptcies. Due to their investments in the firm, his family and many of his friends were also heavily affected by the downfall of the company.

In February 1868, Dunant's mother died. Later that year he was expelled from the YMCA, because he was the Geneva founder of it, and they felt his business failure tainted the group. In March 1867, he left his home city of Geneva, and would not return for the rest of his life. In the following years, Moynier likely used his influence to attempt to ensure that Dunant would not receive assistance and support from his friends. For example, the gold medal prize of Sciences Morales at the Paris World's Fair did not go to Dunant as originally planned but to Moynier, Dufour, and Dunant together so that the prize money would only go to the committee as a whole. Napoléon III's offer to take over half of Dunant's debts if Dunant's friends would secure the other half was also thwarted by Moynier's efforts.

Dunant moved to Paris, where he lived in meagre conditions. However, he continued to pursue his humanitarian ideas and plans. During the Franco-Prussian War (1870–1871), he founded the Common Relief Society (Allgemeine Fürsorgegesellschaft) and soon after the Common Alliance for Order and Civilisation (Allgemeine Allianz für Ordnung und Zivilisation). He argued for disarmament negotiations and for the erection of an international court to mediate international conflicts. Later he worked for the creation of a world library, an idea which had echoes in future projects such as UNESCO.

In his continued pursuit and advocacy of his ideas, he further neglected his personal situation and income, falling further into debt and being shunned by his acquaintances. Despite being appointed an honorary member of the national Red Cross societies of Austria, the Netherlands, Sweden, Prussia and Spain, he was nearly forgotten in the official discourse of the Red Cross Movement, even as it was rapidly expanding to new countries. He lived in poverty, moving to various places between 1874 and 1886, including Stuttgart, Rome, Corfu, Basel, and Karlsruhe. In Stuttgart, he met the Tübingen University student Rudolf Müller with whom he would have a close friendship. In 1881, together with friends from Stuttgart, he went to the small Swiss resort village Heiden for the first time. In 1887 while living in London, he began to receive some monthly financial support from some distant family members. This enabled him to live a somewhat more secure existence, and he moved to Heiden in July. He spent the rest of his life there, and after 30 April 1892, he lived in a hospital and nursing home led by Dr. Hermann Altherr.

In Heiden, he met the young teacher Wilhelm Sonderegger and his wife Susanna; they encouraged him to record his life experiences. Sonderegger's wife founded a branch of the Red Cross in Heiden and in 1890 Dunant became its honorary president. With Sonderegger, Dunant hoped to further promote his ideas, including publishing a new edition of his book. However, their friendship later was strained by Dunant's unjustified accusations that Sonderegger, with Moynier in Geneva, was somehow conspiring against Dunant. Sonderegger died in 1904 at age 42. Despite their strained relationship, Dunant was deeply moved by the unexpected death. Wilhelm and Susanna Sonderegger's admiration for Dunant, felt by both even after Dunant's allegations, was passed on to their children. In 1935, their son René published a compilation of letters from Dunant to his father.

== Return to public memory ==
In September 1895, Georg Baumberger, the chief editor of the St. Gall newspaper Die Ostschweiz, wrote an article about the Red Cross founder, whom he had met and conversed with during a walk in Heiden a month earlier. The article entitled "Henri Dunant, the founder of the Red Cross", appeared in the German Illustrated Magazine Über Land und Meer, and the article was soon reprinted in other publications throughout Europe. The article struck a chord, and he received renewed attention and support. He received the Swiss Binet-Fendt Prize and a note from Pope Leo XIII. Because of support from Russian tsarist widow Maria Feodorovna and other donations, his financial situation improved remarkably.

In 1897, Rudolf Müller, who was now working as a teacher in Stuttgart, wrote a book about the origins of the Red Cross, altering the official history to stress Dunant's role. The book also contained the text of A Memory of Solferino. Dunant began an exchange of correspondence with Bertha von Suttner and wrote numerous articles and writings. He was especially active in writing about women's rights, and in 1897 facilitated the founding of a "Green Cross" women's organization whose only section was briefly active in Brussels.

== Nobel Peace Prize ==
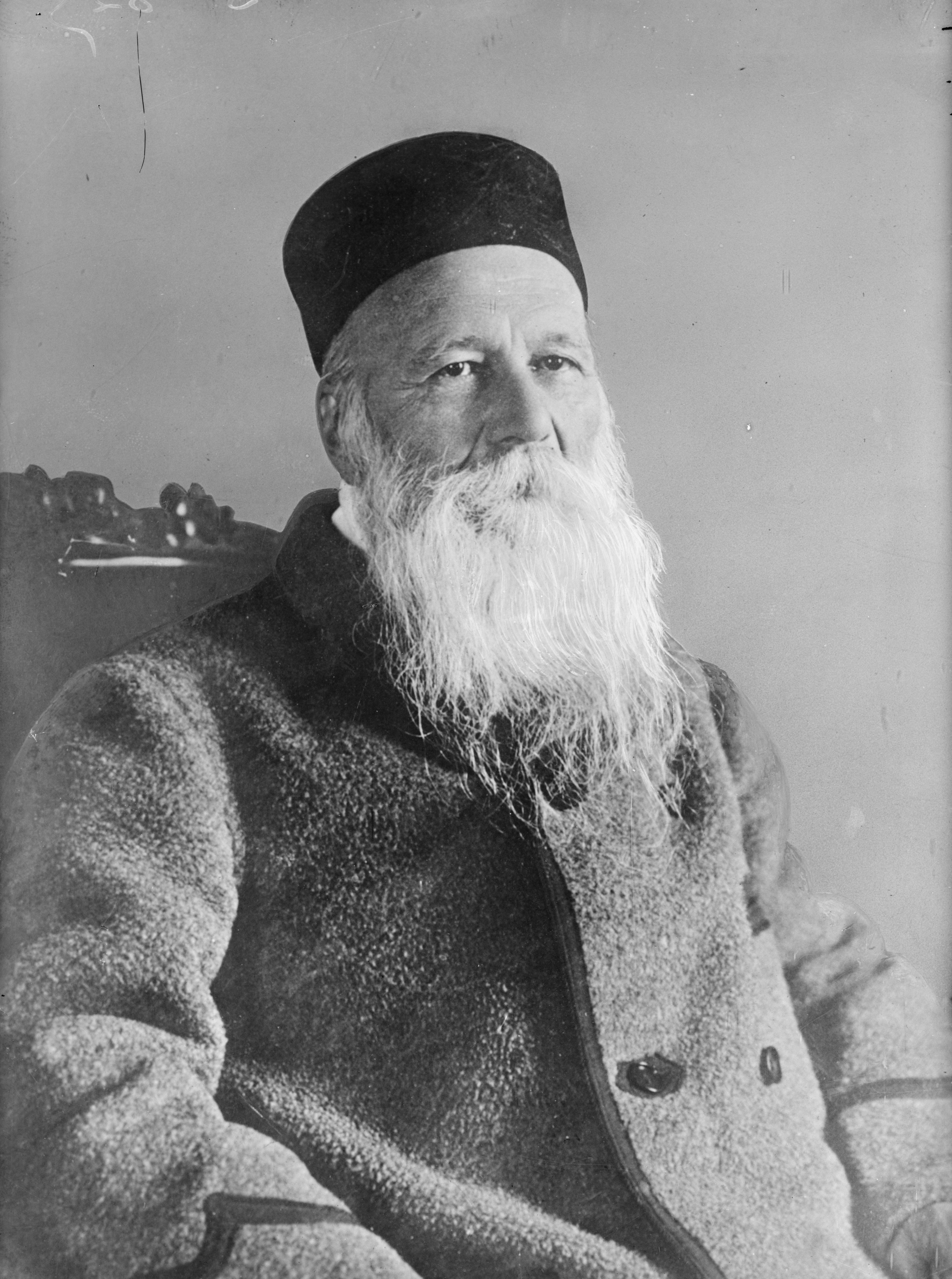
Dunant in 1901

In 1901, Dunant was awarded the first-ever Nobel Peace Prize for his role in founding the International Red Cross Movement and initiating the Geneva Convention. By public and private means, Müller, and later Norwegian military physician Hans Daae (who had received a copy of Müller's book), advocated Dunant's case to the Nobel committee over the course of 4 years. The award was jointly given to French pacifist Frédéric Passy, founder of the Peace League and active with Dunant in the Alliance for Order and Civilization. The official congratulations which he received from the International Committee finally represented the rehabilitation of Dunant's reputation:

"There is no man who more deserves this honour, for it was you, forty years ago, who set on foot the international organization for the relief of the wounded on the battlefield. Without you, the Red Cross, the supreme humanitarian achievement of the nineteenth century would probably have never been undertaken."

Moynier and the International Committee as a whole had also been nominated for the prize. Although Dunant was supported by a broad spectrum in the selection process, he was still a controversial candidate. Some argued that the Red Cross and the Geneva Convention had made war more attractive and imaginable by eliminating some of its suffering. Therefore, Müller, in a letter to the committee, argued that the prize should be divided between Dunant and Passy, who for some time in the debate had been the leading candidate to be the sole recipient of the prize. Müller also suggested that if a prize were to be warranted for Dunant, it should be given immediately because of his advanced age and ill health.

By dividing the prize between Passy, a pacifist, and Dunant, a humanitarian, the Nobel Committee set a precedent for the conditions of the Nobel Peace Prize selection which would have significant consequences in later years. A section of Nobel's will had indicated that the prize should go to an individual who had worked to reduce or eliminate standing armies, or directly to promote peace conferences, which made Passy a natural choice for his peace work. On the other hand, the arguably distinct bestowal for humanitarian effort alone was seen by some as a wide interpretation of Nobel's will. However, another part of Nobel's testament marked the prize for the individual who had best enhanced the "brotherhood of people," which could be interpreted more generally as seeing humanitarian work like Dunant's as connected to peacemaking as well. Many recipients of the Nobel Peace Prize in later years can be assigned to either of these two categories first roughly established by the Nobel committee's decision in 1901.

Hans Daae succeeded in placing Dunant's part of the prize money, 104,000 Swiss Francs, in a Norwegian Bank and preventing access by his creditors. Dunant himself never spent any of the money during his lifetime, continuing to live simply and reserving it for bequests in his will to those who cared for him and charitable causes.

== Death and legacy ==
Among several other awards in the following years, in 1903 Dunant was given an honorary doctorate by the medical faculty of the University of Heidelberg. He lived in the nursing home in Heiden until his death. In the final years of his life, he suffered from depression and paranoia about pursuit by his creditors and Moynier. There were even days when Dunant insisted that the cook of the nursing home first taste his food before his eyes to protect him against possible poisoning. In his final years, he spurned and attacked Calvinism and organized religion generally. He was said to be agnostic.

According to his nurses, the final act of his life was to send a copy of Müller's book to the Italian queen with a personal dedication. He died on 30 October 1910, and his final words were "Where has humanity gone?"

According to his wishes, he was buried without ceremony in the Sihlfeld Cemetery in Zürich. In his will, he donated funds to secure a "free bed" in the Heiden nursing home always to be available for a poor citizen of the region and deeded some money to friends and charitable organizations in Norway and Switzerland. The remaining funds went to his creditors partially relieving his debt; his inability to fully erase his debts was a major burden to him until his death.

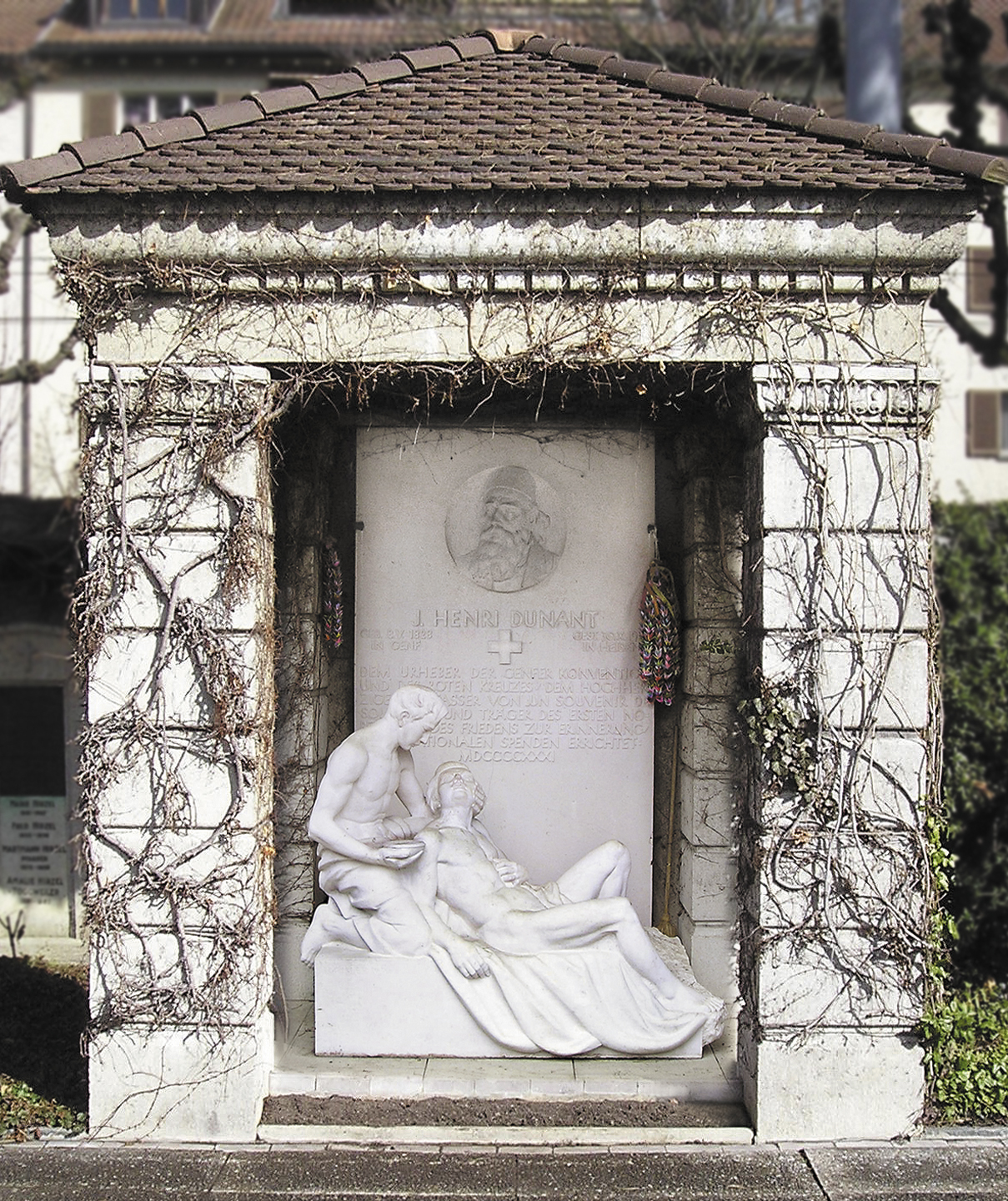
Grave of Henry Dunant

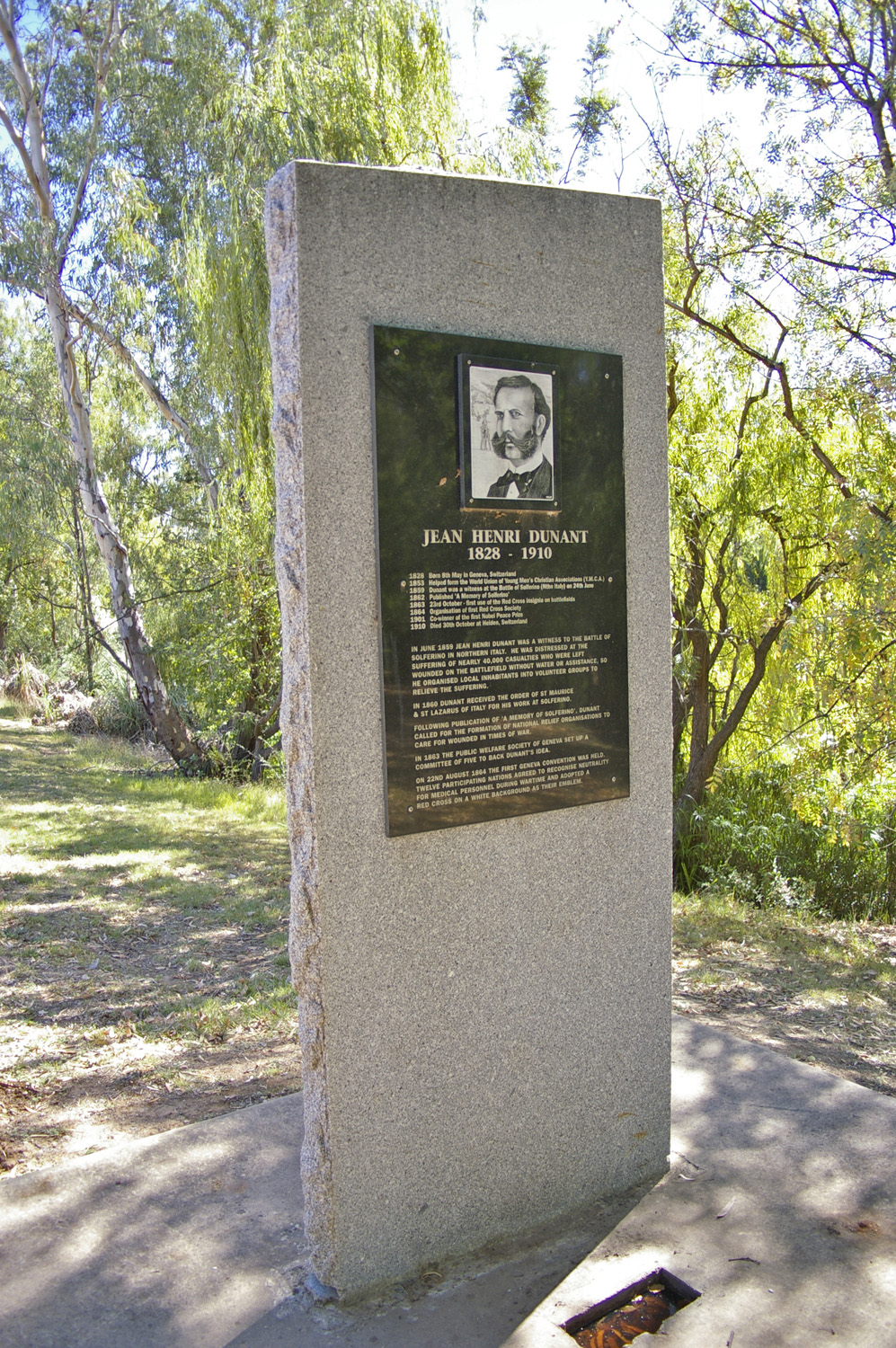
Henry Dunant Monument in Wagga Wagga, Australia

His birthday, 8 May, is celebrated as the World Red Cross and Red Crescent Day. The former nursing home in Heiden now houses the Henry Dunant Museum. In Geneva and other places there are numerous streets, squares, and schools named after him. The Henry Dunant Medal, awarded every two years by the standing commission of the International Red Cross and Red Crescent Movement is its highest decoration.

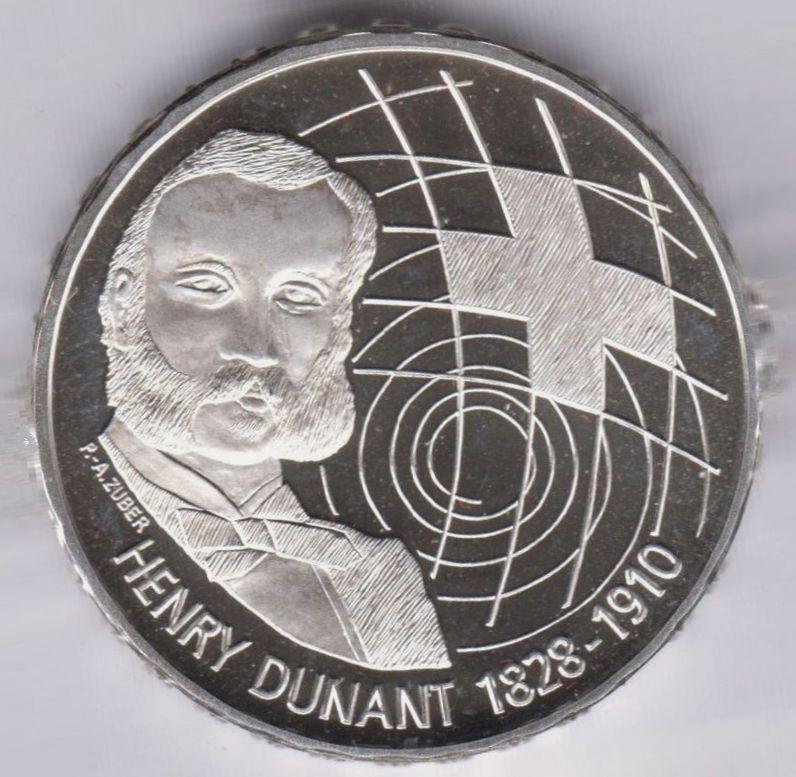
Swiss 20 franc coin memorializing the 100th anniversary of Dunant's death

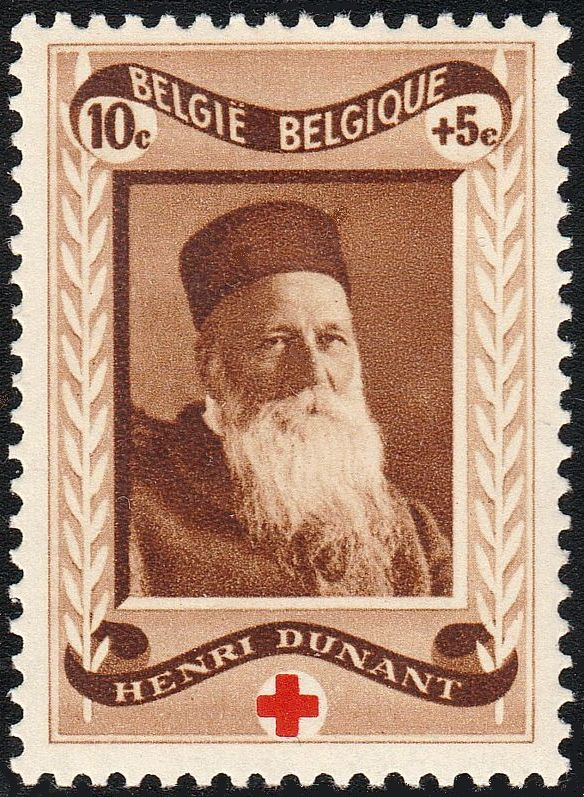
Henri Dunant was honoured on a Belgium semi-postal stamp in 1939, which helped to provide funding to the Red Cross

His life is represented, with some fictional elements, in the film D'homme à hommes (1948), starring Jean-Louis Barrault, and the period of his life when the Red Cross was founded in the international film coproduction Henry Dunant: Red on the Cross (2006). In 2010 the Takarazuka Revue staged a musical based on his time in Solferino and the founding of the Red Cross entitled Dawn at Solferino, or Where has Humanity Gone?.

- In honour of Henry Dunant, the second highest peak in Switzerland was renamed from Ostspitze to Dunantspitze (Peak Dunant) by Swiss Federal President Didier Burkhalter on 6 October 2014.
- Henry Dunant Hospital is a general hospital in Athens, Greece.
- The road where the headquarters of the Thai Red Cross Society is situated on is named as Henri Dunant Road (Thai: ถนนอังรีดูนังต์) since 8 May 1965.
- In 2020 a submarine internet cable named Dunant was laid between Virginia Beach, (United States) and Saint-Hilaire-de-Riez, (France) financed by two private firms

== Honors and awards ==
- Knight of the Order of Legion of Honour (1865)
- Order of Glory (Tunisia)
- Order of Saints Maurice and Lazarus
- Order of the Zähringer Lion
- Order of Vasa
- Albert Order

== Cultural depictions ==
- Henry Dunant: Red on the Cross (fr. Henry Dunant: Rouge sur la Croix), 2006. French/Swiss/Austria co-production starring Thomas Jouannet written by Claude-Michel Rome directed by Dominique Othenin-Girard.
- Man to Men (fr. D'homme à hommes) a 1948 French-Swiss historical drama film directed by Christian-Jaque and starring Jean-Louis Barrault, Bernard Blier and Hélène Perdrière.

== See also ==
- Henry Dunant Medal
- List of peace activists
- Dunantist
- International Red Cross and Red Crescent Movement

== Honors and awards ==
- Nobel Peace Prize (1901)

== Sources ==
=== English books ===
- Boissier, Pierre (1985), History of the International Committee of the Red Cross (in English, French, and Spanish), vol. I: From Solferino to Tsushima (2nd ed.), Geneva: International Committee of the Red Cross, ICRC, ISBN 978-2-88044-012-1
  - Boissier, Pierre (1974), Henri Dunant (PDF) (in English, German, French, and Spanish), Geneva: International Committee of the Red Cross, ICRC, ISBN 978-2-88044-012-1
- Chaponnière, Corinne (2022), Henry Dunant, The Man of the Red Cross (hardcover ed.), London: Bloomsbury Academic, ISBN 978-1-3502-5343-8 online review
- Dunant, Henri (1986) [originally published 1862], A Memory of Solferino (in English, French, Spanish, Arabic, and Chinese), Geneva, Switzerland: International Committee of the Red Cross, ICRC, ISBN 978-2-88145-006-8 online
- Masters, Peter (2008), "chapter 8 – The Man Behind the Red Cross", Men of Destiny (paperback ed.), London: Wakeman Trust, ISBN 978-1-870855-55-6
- Moorehead, Caroline (1998), Dunant's dream: War, Switzerland and the history of the Red Cross (hardcover ed.), London: HarperCollins, ISBN 978-0-00-255141-0

=== German books ===
- Hasler, Eveline (2010), Der Zeitreisende. Die Geschichte eines Menschen, dessen Visionen weit über seine Zeit hinausgingen (Roman) (in German) (4. ed.), Germany: dtv, ISBN 978-3-423-13073-8, archived from the original on 12 July 2015
- Gumpert, Martin (1938), Dunant. Der Roman des Roten Kreuzes (in German), Frankfurt: Fischer Taschenbuch Verlag
- Heudtlass, Willy; Walter Gruber (1985), Jean Henry Dunant. Gründer des Roten Kreuzes, Urheber der Genfer Konvention (in German) (4. ed.), Stuttgart: Kohlhammer Verlag, ISBN 978-3-17-008670-8
