= The Seventh Door =

1947 film

- Directed by: André Zwoboda
- Written by: Jean Aurenche; Pierre Bost
- Produced by: Hervé Missir
- Starring: Georges Marchal; María Casares; Aimé Clariond
- Cinematography: Marcel Grignon
- Edited by: Andrée Laurent
- Music by: Georges Auric (Composer of the original score); Hédi Jouini (Writer of the original songs)
- Production company: Ciné Reportages
- Distributed by: Alliance Générale de Distribution Cinématographique
- Release date: 10 June 1947
- Running time: 88 minutes
- Country: France
- Language: French

The Seventh Door or The Seventh Gate (French: La septième porte) is a 1947 French drama film directed by André Zwoboda and starring Georges Marchal, María Casares and Aimé Clariond. The film's sets were designed by the art director Raymond Gabutti. Location shooting took place in French Morocco during the summer of 1946.

== Cast ==
- Georges Marchal as Ali
- María Casares as Léila
- Touria Chaoui as young Léila
- Aimé Clariond as Le fonctionnaire
- Catherine Arley as Aicha
- Jean Servais as Le chauffeur du car
- Jean Périer as Le veillard arabe
- André Bervil as lui-même
- Albert Glado as Ahmed
- Liane Daydé as Leila enfant
- Hédi Jouini as Le chanteur
- Ninette Al-Abitbol as La chanteuse
- Jean Nosserot
- Georges Chamarat
- Gabsi Kaltoum

== Bibliography ==
- Leahy, Sarah & Vanderschelden, Isabelle. Screenwriters in French cinema. Manchester University Press, 2021.
- Roust, Colin. Georges Auric: A Life in Music and Politics. Oxford University Press, 2020.
- Spaas, Lieve. Francophone Film: A Struggle for Identity. Manchester University Press, 2000.
