= Paul-Edmond Decharme =

French film producer (1907–1984)

- Born: 11 January 1907; Paris, France
- Died: 8 March 1984 (aged 77); Saint-Dizier, Haute-Marne, France
- Occupation: Producer
- Years active: 1945–1967 (film)

Paul-Edmond Decharme (1907–1984) was a French film producer. He headed the production company Alcina which was active after the Second World War.

In the 1950s he made several films in collaborations with Australia.

== Selected filmography ==
- The Black Cavalier (1945)
- Blondine (1945)
- Martin Roumagnac (1946)
- The Eternal Husband (1946)
- Mirror (1947)
- Le voleur se porte bien (1948)
- The Mystery of the Yellow Room (1949)
- The Perfume of the Lady in Black (1949)
- Manon (1949)
- Miquette (1950)
- Bluebeard (1951)
- The Lovers of Bras-Mort (1951)
- The Red Needle (1951)
- Leathernose (1952)
- The Stowaway (1958)
- Bay of Angels (1963)
- Backfire (1964)
- Crime on a Summer Morning (1965)
- Tender Scoundrel (1966)
- All Mad About Him (1967)

== Bibliography ==
- Loubier, Jean-Marc. Michel Simon: Ou Le roman d'un jouisseur. Ramsay, 1989.
- Mayer, Geoff & Beattie, Keith (ed.) The Cinema of Australia and New Zealand. Wallflower Press, 2007.
