= Vincent, François, Paul and the Others =

- Theatrical release poster
- Directed by: Claude Sautet
- Written by: Claude Néron (novel); Jean-Loup Dabadie
- Produced by: Raymond Danon
- Starring: Yves Montand; Michel Piccoli; Serge Reggiani; Gérard Depardieu
- Cinematography: Jean Boffety
- Edited by: Jacqueline Thiédot; Noelle Balenci
- Music by: Philippe Sarde
- Distributed by: S.N.E.G.
- Release date: 1974
- Running time: 113 minutes
- Country: France
- Language: French

Vincent, François, Paul and the Others (French: Vincent, François, Paul et les autres) is a 1974 French film directed by Claude Sautet based on the novel La grande Marrade by Claude Néron.

== Plot ==
Three friends face mid-life crises. Paul is a writer who's blocked. François has lost his ideals and practices medicine for the money; his wife grows distant, even hostile. The charming Vincent, everyone's favorite, faces bankruptcy, his mistress leaves him, and his wife, from whom he's separated, wants a divorce.

== Cast ==
- Yves Montand as Vincent
- Michel Piccoli as François
- Serge Reggiani as Paul
- Gérard Depardieu as Jean Lavallee
- Stéphane Audran as Catherine
- Marie Dubois as Lucie
- Umberto Orsini as Jacques
- Ludmila Mikaël as Marie
- Antonella Lualdi as Julia
- Catherine Allégret as Colette
- Betty Beckers as Myriam
- Yves Gabrielli as Michel
- Jean Capel as Jamain
- Mohamed Galoul as Jo Catano
- Jacques Richard as Armand
- David Tonelli as Marco
- Nicolas Vogel as Clovis
- Jean-Denis Robert as Pierre
- Myriam Boyer as Laurence
- Daniel Lecourtois as Georges
- Pierre Maguelon as Farina
- Maurice Auzel as Simon

== Reception ==
Roger Ebert gave the film 4 out of 4 stars.
