= François Villon (film) =

- Directed by: André Zwoboda
- Written by: Justin Huntly McCarthy (play); Pierre Mac Orlan; André Zwoboda
- Produced by: André Tranché
- Starring: Serge Reggiani; Jean-Roger Caussimon; Henri Crémieux
- Cinematography: Louis Page
- Music by: Georges Auric; Tony Aubin
- Production company: Les Films Corona
- Release date: 2 September 1945
- Running time: 95 minutes
- Country: France
- Language: French

François Villon is a 1945 French historical drama film directed by André Zwoboda and starring Serge Reggiani, Jean-Roger Caussimon and Henri Crémieux. It portrays the life of the fifteenth century French poet (and criminal) François Villon. The film was inspired by the play If I Were King by Justin Huntly McCarthy.

== Cast ==
- Serge Reggiani as François Villon
- Jean-Roger Caussimon as Le grand écolier
- Henri Crémieux as Maître Piédoux
- Pierre Dargout as Thibaud
- Guy Decomble as Denisot
- Claudine Dupuis as Huguette du Hainaut
- Jacques-Henry Duval as Tuvache
- Renée Faure as Catherine de Vauselles
- Gabrielle Fontan as La Villonne
- Micheline Francey as Guillemette
- Gustave Gallet as Guillaume de Villon
- Léon Larive as Turgis
- Frédéric Mariotti as Arnoulet
- Albert Michel as Le paysan accusé
- Albert Montigny as Ratier
- Jean Morel as Alain
- Denise Noël as Margot
- Julienne Paroli as La mère
- Marcel Pérès as Le Goliard
- Albert Rémy as Perrot
- Michel Vitold as Noël, le borgne
- Jean Carmet as Un compagnon de François

== Bibliography ==
- Harty, Kevin J. The Reel Middle Ages: American, Western and Eastern European, Middle Eastern, and Asian Films about Medieval Europe. McFarland, 1999.
