= Allgemeine Allianz für Ordnung und Zivilisation =

The Allgemeinen Allianz für Ordnung und Zivilisation (Universal Alliance for Order and Civilization) was an organisation formed during the Franco-German War in 1871 by Henri Dunant together with some friends, among them Frédéric Passy. The organisation attempted to promote the idea of an international convention on the medical treatment of Prisoners of War and the reconciliation of international conflicts by arbitration.

== Aims ==
With regards to the former aim, Dunant drew up a charter with five aims:

- the prisoner should be provided with all that was strictly necessary for his well-being;
- he should have facilities for communication with his family and friends,
- his journeys to camp or for repatriation should have an accepted standard of comfort;
- the prisoner who died should have decent burial and a record made for his relatives;
- good feeling should be promoted between the prisoner and the people against whom he had fought.

== Failure ==
The first international conference of Weltweiten Allgemeinen Allianz für Ordnung und Zivilisation took place in 1872. However, the attempts were unsuccessful: Dunant was too ill (and no longer wealthy enough) to travel to conferences in person. Without his personal leadership, the Alliance collapsed in 1876.

== Legacy ==
Partial protection of prisoners of war did not come about until the Hague conference of 1907.

Dunant lived to see that. But he did not live to see the Geneva Convention of 1929 that finally introduced the ideas Dunant had fought for.
