= Desert Wedding =

1948 film

- Directed by: André Zwoboda
- Written by: André Zwoboda
- Starring: Denise Cardi
- Cinematography: André Bac
- Edited by: Charles Bretoneiche
- Music by: Georges Auric
- Production company: Studio Maghreb
- Distributed by: Standing Films
- Release dates: 4 September 1948 (Venice Film Festival); 9 May 1949 (France)
- Running time: 61 minutes
- Country: France
- Language: French

Desert Wedding (French: Les noces de sable) is a 1948 French drama film directed by André Zwoboda and starring Denise Cardi, Larbi Tounsi and Himmoud Brahimi. Location shooting took place in the Atlas Mountains of French Morocco. It was originally screened at the 1948 Venice Film Festival before being released in France the following year. The narration was spoken by filmmaker Jean Cocteau. In the United States it was released in 1952 by DisCina with the alternative title of Daughter of the Sands.

== Cast ==
- Denise Cardi as La princesse
- Larbi Tounsi as Le prince
- Himmoud Brahimi as Le bouffon
- Bent Larsen as Le prince
- Jean Cocteau as Narrator

== Bibliography ==
- Rège, Philippe. Encyclopedia of French Film Directors, Volume 1. Scarecrow Press, 2009.
- Spaas, Lieve. Francophone Film: A Struggle for Identity. Manchester University Press, 2000.
