= Scandal (1948 film) =

1948 film

- Directed by: René Le Hénaff
- Written by: Pierre Léaud
- Produced by: Jean Clerc
- Starring: Paul Meurisse; Odette Joyeux; Jacqueline Pierreux
- Cinematography: Marc Fossard
- Edited by: Hélène Battini
- Music by: Georges Van Parys
- Production company: Societe Universelle de Films
- Distributed by: Pathé Consortium Cinéma
- Release date: 1 December 1948
- Running time: 90 minutes
- Country: France
- Language: French

Scandal (French: Scandale) is a 1948 French mystery crime thriller film directed by René Le Hénaff and starring Paul Meurisse, Odette Joyeux and Jacqueline Pierreux. The film's sets were designed by the art director Robert Dumesnil.

== Synopsis ==
Cécilia inherits a shady nightclub when her uncle dies. As it hard for the young woman to gain respect running the venue, Cécilia invents a fictitious husband gangster Steve Richardson. However one day a stranger turns up claiming to be Steve Richardson.

== Cast ==
- Paul Meurisse as Steve Richardson
- Odette Joyeux as Cécilia
- Albert Dinan as Jeff
- Jacqueline Pierreux as Lily
- Philippe Lemaire as Pierre Porteval
- Charlotte Ecard as Suzanne
- Marcel Lupovici as Bonardi
- Philippe Olive as Raoul
- Marcel Pérès as M. Porteval
- Renée Thorel as Mme Porteval
- Jean Clarieux as Jo, le balafré
- Arsenio as Le tueur
- Yette Lucas as La logeuse

== Bibliography ==
- Bessy, Maurice & Chirat, Raymond. Histoire du cinéma français: encyclopédie des films, 1940–1950. Pygmalion, 1986
- Rège, Philippe. Encyclopedia of French Film Directors, Volume 1. Scarecrow Press, 2009.
