= Follow That Man (1953 film) =

1953 film by Georges Lampin

- Directed by: Georges Lampin
- Written by: Alexandre Breffort; Jacques Rémy
- Produced by: Roger Ribadeau-Dumas
- Starring: Bernard Blier; Suzy Prim; René Blancard
- Cinematography: Jean Bourgoin
- Edited by: Monique Isnardon; Robert Isnardon
- Music by: Maurice Thiriet
- Production company: La Société des Films Sirius
- Distributed by: La Société des Films Sirius
- Release date: 27 February 1953
- Running time: 95 minutes
- Country: France
- Language: French

Follow That Man (French: Suivez cet homme) is a 1953 French crime film directed by Georges Lampin and starring Bernard Blier, Suzy Prim and René Blancard.

== Cast ==
- Bernard Blier as Commissaire François Basquier
- Suzy Prim as Mme Olga
- René Blancard as Dr. Corbier
- Andrée Clément as Arlette Génod
- Guy Decomble as Emile Kortenwirth
- Véronique Deschamps as Yvonne Chouquet - l'employée de Courvoisier
- Arthur Devère as M. Forgeat
- Paul Frankeur as M. Mallet
- Yves Robert as Inspecteur Paulhan
- Julien Verdier as Guy Couvoisier - le bijoutier
- Laurence Badie as Georgette, la bonne
- Madeleine Barbulée as Mme Durbain - la concierge
- Daniel Cauchy as Pierrot
- Dominique Davray as Mme Fernande - la couturière
- Christian Fourcade as Le petit Jacky
- René Havard as Un inspecteur
- Albert Michel as Le contrôleur de la prison
- France Roche as Alice Tissot
- Michel Salina
- Paul Villé as Marcel - le beau-frère de François
- Luc Andrieux as Le régisseur du studio de cinéma
- René Berthier as Le curé
- Gérard Buhr as Le jeune au flipper
- Émile Genevois as Le garagiste
- Gabriel Gobin as L'agent Faurel
- François Joux as L'inspecteur Calmain
- Robert Le Béal as Un inspecteur
- Robert Mercier as Un agent
- Émile Riandreys as Le couturier
- Eugène Stuber as Le bistrot
- Jean Sylvère as L'inspecteur Martin

== Bibliography ==
- Tim Palmer. Tales of the Underworld: Jean-Pierre Melville and the 1950s French Cinema. University of Wisconsin, 2003.
