= The Bear Cage =

1974 film

- Directed by: Marian Handwerker
- Written by: Paul Paquay
- Produced by: Jacqueline Pierreux
- Starring: Jean Pascal
- Cinematography: Michel Baudour
- Edited by: Michèle Maquet; Denise Vindevogel
- Release date: 1974
- Running time: 90 minutes
- Country: Belgium
- Language: French

The Bear Cage (French: La cage aux ours) is a 1974 Belgian drama film directed by Marian Handwerker. It was entered into the 1974 Cannes Film Festival.

== Cast ==
- Jean Pascal as Léopold Thiry
- Yvette Merlin as La mère
- Michel François as Bernard
- Puce as Julie
- Pascal Bruno as Grand-père
- Daniel Dury as Lucien
- Jacques Courtois as Prof. de français
- Marcel Melebeck as Frère du père
- Tine Briac as Femme du frère
- Jules Goffaux as Le colonel
- Patrick Boelen as Dumont
