= Jacqueline Pierreux =

French actress (1923–2005)

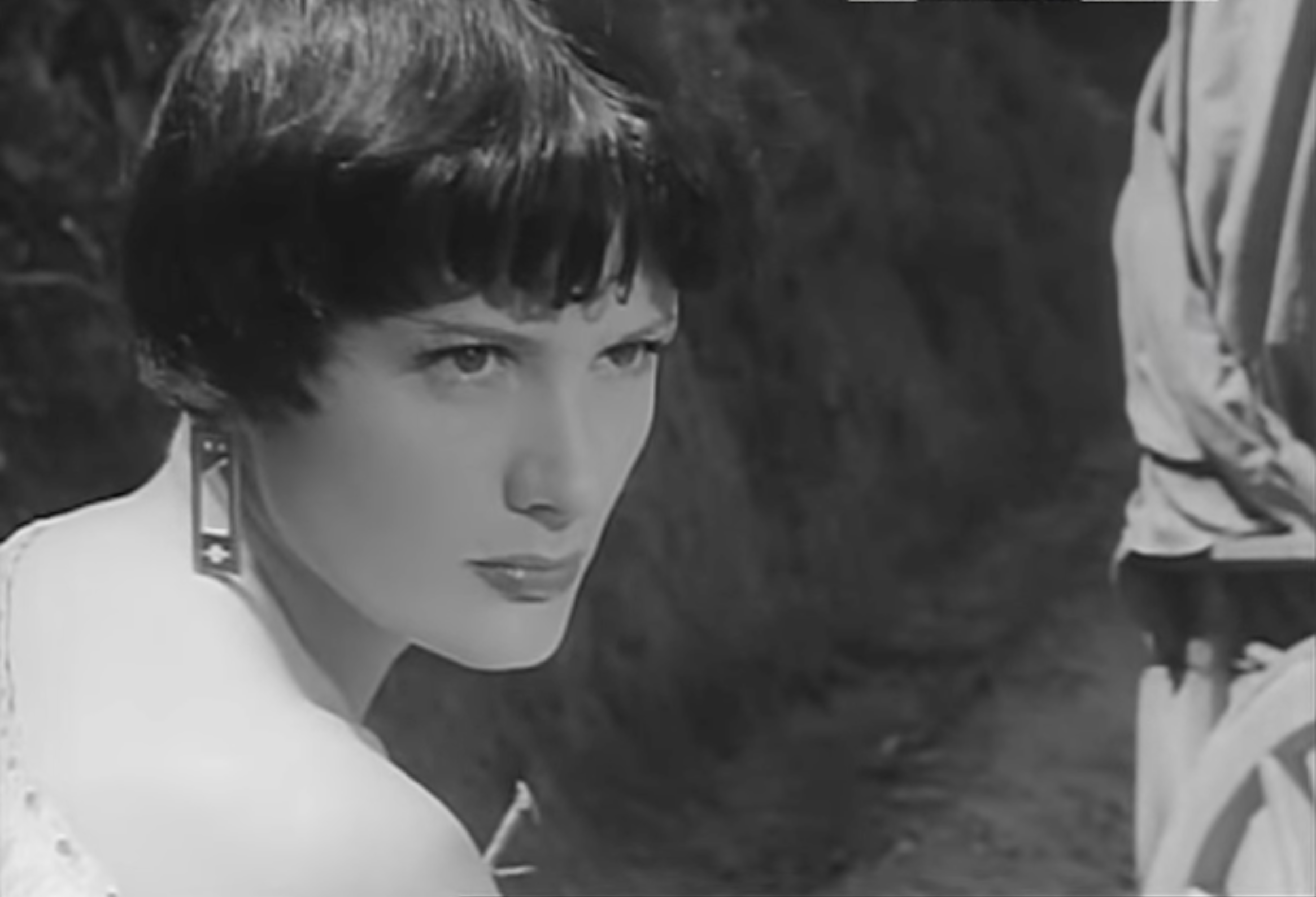
- Pierreux in Women and Brigands (1950)
- Born: 15 January 1923; Rouen, France
- Died: 10 March 2005 (aged 82); Salins, France
- Resting place: Merri
- Occupations: Producer, Actress
- Years active: 1943–1980 (film & TV)

Jacqueline Pierreux (15 January 1923 – 10 March 2005) was a French film and television actress. From the early 1970s onwards she also enjoyed success as a producer. She was the wife of screenwriter Pierre Léaud and the mother of prolific film actor Jean-Pierre Léaud who starred in Francois Truffaut's The 400 Blows and Day For Night.

== Selected filmography ==
- The Midnight Sun (1943)
- Six Hours to Lose (1946)
- The Ideal Couple (1946)
- Dawn Devils (1946)
- That's Not the Way to Die (1946)
- Vertigo (1947)
- Scandal (1948)
- Between Eleven and Midnight (1949)
- L' Amore di Norma (1950)
- Rome Express (1950)
- Women and Brigands (1950)
- Murders (1950)
- Le Dindon (1951)
- The Case of Doctor Galloy (1951)
- Abbiamo vinto! (1951)
- Malavita (1951)
- We Are All Murderers (1952)
- Feather in the Wind (1952)
- In the Land of the Sun (1952)
- The Porter from Maxim's (1953)
- Top of the Form (1953)
- This Man Is Dangerous (1953)
- After You Duchess (1954)
- Légère et court vêtue (1954)
- Il seduttore (1954)
- The Cock Crow (1955)
- Mannequins of Paris (1956)
- The Big Lie (1956)
- Who Hesitates Is Lost (1960)
- La Vendetta (1962)
- The Threepenny Opera (1963)
- The Reunion
- Black Sabbath Segment: "Drop of Water" (1963)
- Home Sweet Home (1973)
- The Bear Cage (1974)

== Bibliography ==
- Philip Mosley. Split Screen: Belgian Cinema and Cultural Identity. SUNY Press, 2001.
