= Hédi Jouini =

- الهادي الجويني
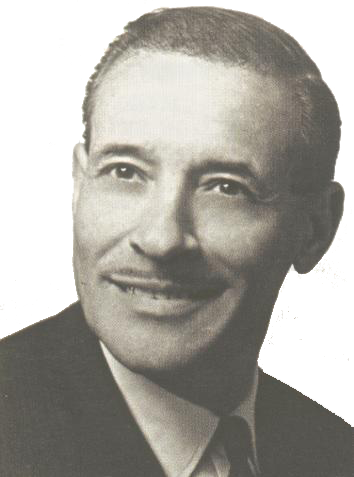
- Portrait of Jouini.
- Born: Mohamed Hédi Ben Abdessalem Ben Ahmed Ben Hassine; 1 November 1909; Tunis, French Tunisia
- Died: 30 November 1990 (aged 81)
- Occupations: Singer, oud player, composer
- Partner: Ninette Al-Abitbol
- Children: Ferid Belhassine (Freddie); Adel Belhassine (Adel Jouini); Naoufel Belhassine; Nabil Belhassine; Afifa Belhassine; Samia Belhassine
- Father: Abdessalem Belhassine
- Relatives: Claire Liza Belhassine (granddaughter)

Hédi Jouini (1 November 1909 – 30 November 1990) was a Tunisian singer, oud player, and composer. In his long career, Jouini composed close to 1,070 songs and 56 operettas. His songs are inspired by traditional Andalusian music, and found great popularity in Tunisia and the countries of the Mashriq.

== Life ==
He was born Mohamed Hédi Ben Abdessalem Ben Ahmed Ben Hassine in the Bab Jedid quarter of Tunis. In his youth, he sang religious hymns for local ceremonies, including those for circumcision. He abandoned academic pursuits for music and song. He particularly liked the works of singer Mohammed Abdel Wahab.

Mohamed Hédi Ben Hassine adopted the stage name Hédi Jouini to conceal his singing career from his father, who disapproved of his involvement in music. He chose the surname "Jouini" from their neighbors.

== Music career ==
=== Debut ===
After a brief sojourn at The Rachidia, from the age of sixteen Jouini began to appear in local bands as a mandolin player. He was introduced to the oud by Mouni Jebali, father of Maurice Meimoun. At 20 years of age, his popularity increased upon singing with the Arruqi troupe at the Bab Souika.

He worked with Mahmoud Bayram al-Tunisi.

=== Later life ===
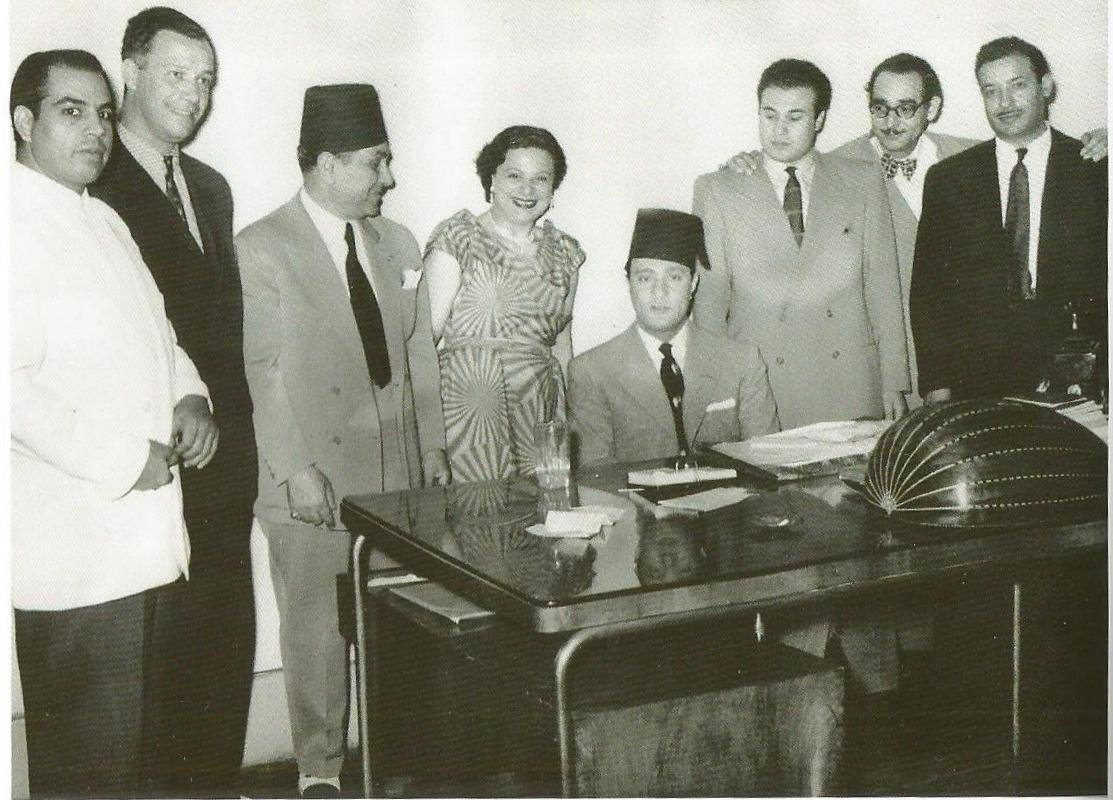
Mohamed Abdel Wahab with guests in his office in March 1951, including Hédi Jouini (far right) and Noureddine Ben Mahmoud (second from left)

He played a live concert for the inauguration of Radio Tunis in 1938.

In the 1940s, he appeared in the film Le Possédé by Jean Bastia. He composed songs for the 1948 film La Septième Porte by André Zwobada, in which he appeared along with his wife Widad.

In 1986, he produced his last composisition Masbarnech. A year later, in 1987, Jouini made his last public appearance on stage at the International Festival of Carthage.

In 2017, his granddaughter Claire Belhassine produced a documentary titled Papa Hédi, which explores his personal life, including his traditional views on family, his refusal to allow his partner and daughters to sing, and the conflicts surrounding his legacy.

== Personal life ==
Hédi Jouini started a family with Ninette Al-Abitbol, a Jewish Tunisian singer known as Wided, who was twenty years his junior. Jouini was from the Bab Jedid neighborhood, while Alabtibol came from the Jewish Tunisian community in El Hafsia and Lafayette neighborhoods of Tunis.

Together, they had four sons and two daughters. Due to his partner's religion, they never married, and their children later emigrated to Europe or the United States.

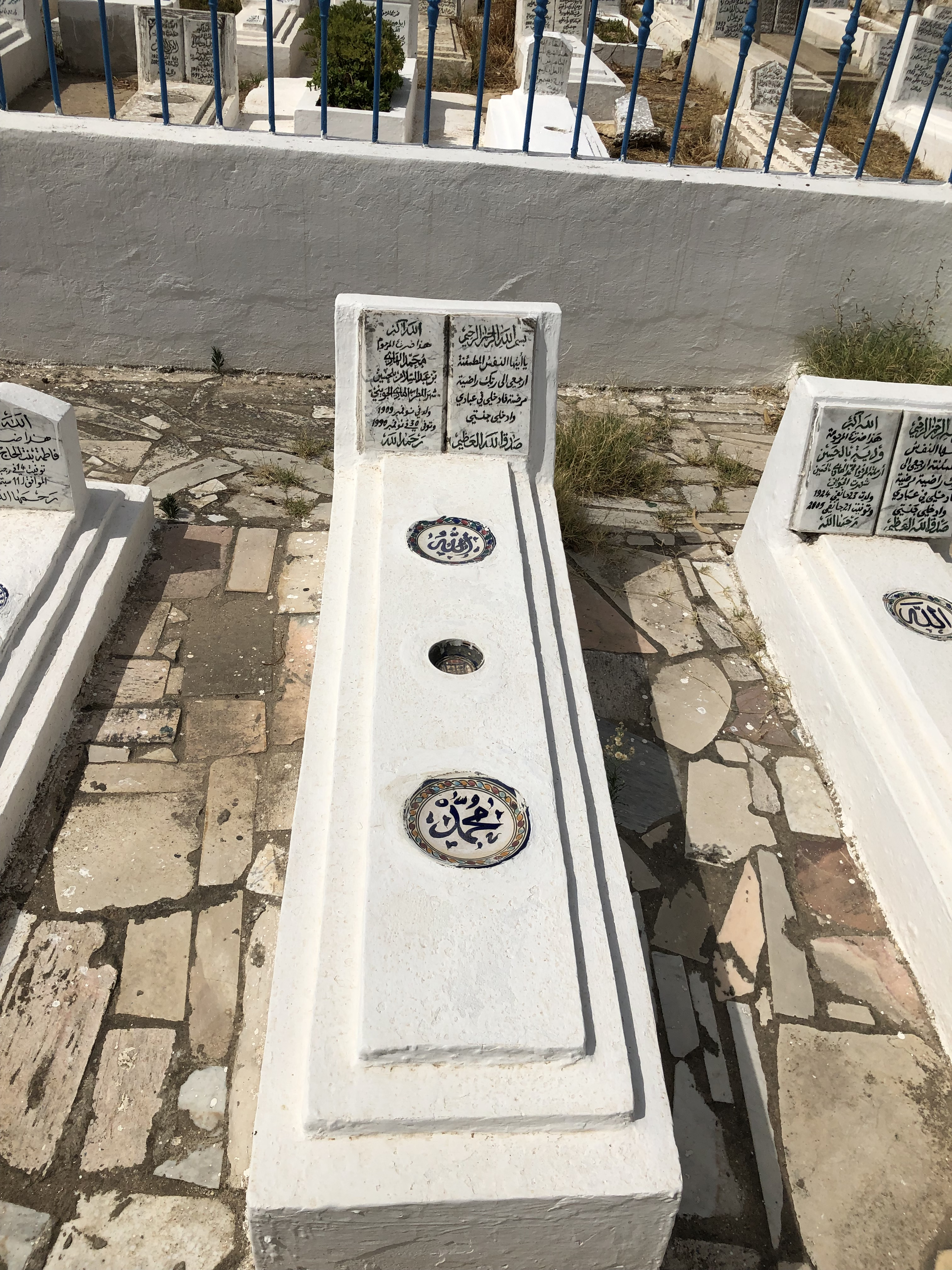
Tomb of Hédi Jouini in Djellaz cemetery

== Honors and awards ==
In 1966, he was elevated to the rank of officer of the Order of the Republic of Tunisia by president Habib Bourguiba. He received a new decoration from President Bourguiba in 1982 for his work and contribution to the enrichment of the Tunisian cultural patrimony.

In 1982, he was honored again by President Habib Bourguiba in recognition of his overall body of work and his contribution to Tunisia's cultural heritage.

== Influence ==
A film documenting the life of Hedi Jouini, Papa Hédi: The Man Behind the Microphone, was released in 2017.
