= The Perfume of the Lady in Black (1949 film) =

1949 film

- Directed by: Louis Daquin
- Written by: Gaston Leroux (novel); Jean Ferry; Vladimir Pozner
- Produced by: Paul-Edmond Decharme
- Starring: Hélène Perdrière; Serge Reggiani; Marcel Herrand
- Cinematography: André Bac
- Edited by: Claude Nicole
- Music by: Jean Wiener
- Production company: Alcina
- Distributed by: Les Films Corona
- Release date: 5 October 1949
- Running time: 100 minutes
- Country: France
- Language: French

The Perfume of the Lady in Black (French: Le Parfum de la dame en noir) is a 1949 French crime film directed by Louis Daquin and starring Hélène Perdrière, Serge Reggiani and Marcel Herrand. It is an adaptation of the 1908 novel The Perfume of the Lady in Black by Gaston Leroux featuring the detective Joseph Rouletabille. It is a sequel to The Mystery of the Yellow Room, released the same year.

The film's sets were designed by the art director Max Douy. The score was composed by Jean Wiener.

== Main cast ==
- Hélène Perdrière as Mathilde Stangerson
- Serge Reggiani as Joseph Rouletabille
- Lucien Nat as Robert Darzac
- Michel Piccoli as Lebel
- Gaston Modot as Mathieu
- Marcel Herrand as Larsan
- Arthur Devère as Père Jacques
- Yvette Etiévant as Une fille à la soirée chez Rouletabille

== Bibliography ==
- Parish, Robert. Film Actors Guide. Scarecrow Press, 1977.
