= Manon (1949 film) =

- Directed by: Henri-Georges Clouzot
- Written by: Jean Ferry; Henri-Georges Clouzot
- Based on: Manon Lescaut by Antoine François Prévost
- Produced by: Paul-Edmond Decharme
- Starring: Serge Reggiani; Michel Auclair; Cécile Aubry
- Cinematography: Armand Thirard
- Edited by: Monique Kirsanoff
- Music by: Paul Misraki
- Production company: Alcina
- Distributed by: Les Films Corona
- Release date: 9 March 1949
- Running time: 106 minutes
- Country: France
- Language: French

Manon (French pronunciation: [manɔ̃]) is a 1949 French drama film directed by Henri-Georges Clouzot and starring Serge Reggiani, Michel Auclair and Cécile Aubry. It is a loose adaptation of the 1731 novel Manon Lescaut by Abbé Prévost. Clouzot updates the setting to World War II, making the story about a French Resistance fighter who rescues a woman from villagers convinced she is a Nazi collaborator.

The film won the Golden Lion at the Venice Film Festival, and was a popular success with over three million tickets sold in France.

It was shot at the Victorine Studios in Nice. The film's sets were designed by the art director Max Douy.

The film was originally banned by the British Board of Film Censors, but was later passed with an X certificate in 1951.

== Plot ==
A cargo ship departing from Marseille carrys Jewish Holocaust survivors en route to the newly established state of Israel. The crew discovers two stowaways: Robert Dégrieux (Michel Auclair) and Manon Lescaut (Cécile Aubry). The captain threatens to throw them overboard upon learning Robert is wanted for murder. To appeal for mercy, Robert recounts their story.

The narrative flashes back to 1944 in a Normandy village during the Liberation. Allied bombs rain down on the area. In the crypt of a destroyed church, villagers accuse Manon of collaborating with the Nazis. They threaten to shave her head and prepare to execute her. Robert, a French Resistance fighter tasked with guarding her, falls under her spell and rescues her.

The pair travels by train to Paris, sharing intimate moments along the way. In Paris, they reunite with Manon's brother, Léon Lescaut (Serge Reggiani), a black market operator. They settle in a rundown hotel. Manon, accustomed to luxury, grows dissatisfied with their impoverished life. Léon encourages her to capitalize on her beauty and introduces her to Madame Agnes, who runs a high-class brothel.

Manon begins working as a prostitute to afford fine clothes and jewelry. Robert, employed in menial jobs, remains unaware at first. When he discovers her secret after seeing her with a client, he confronts her in jealousy. Manon promises to stop, but the allure of wealth proves too strong.

To escape the cycle, Robert steals money from his employer, and they flee to the countryside. They purchase a small house and live idyllic days, planning to marry. However, Léon locates them and persuades Manon to return to Paris, promising greater riches.

Back in the city, Manon resumes her lavish lifestyle through prostitution and black market involvement. Robert spirals into despair, gambling away money. Overwhelmed by Robert's possessive love, Manon conspires with Léon to lock Robert in a room. She intends to run off and marry a wealthy American suitor.

Robert breaks free and confronts them. In the ensuing violent altercation, Robert kills Léon. Now fugitives, Manon and Robert sell Manon's jewels to fund their escape. They connect with an underground network smuggling Jewish refugees and board the cargo ship as stowaways.

Returning to the present on the ship, the captain, though sympathetic, must alert authorities. As police approach, Robert seizes a gun from a guard. The couple escapes the vessel and joins the refugees disembarking in Palestine. To evade detection, the group treks across the desert on foot.

Amid the grueling journey under scorching sun and lacking water, many perish. Manon, weakened by thirst and exhaustion, collapses. She dies in Robert's arms. Heartbroken, Robert buries her body in the sand dunes and lies down beside her grave, his future uncertain.

== Cast ==
- Cécile Aubry as Manon Lescaut
- Michel Auclair as Robert Dégrieux
- Serge Reggiani as Leon Lescaut
- Andrex as Le trafiquant
- Raymond Souplex as M. Paul
- André Valmy as Lieutenant Besnard / Bandit Chief
- Henri Vilbert as Le commandant du navire / Ship's Captain
- Héléna Manson as La commère
- Dora Doll as Juliette
- Simone Valère as Isé, la soubrette
- Gabrielle Fontan as La vendeuse à la toilette
- Gabrielle Dorziat as Mme Agnès
- Rosy Varte as Petit rôle
- Michel Bouquet as Le second
- Robert Dalban as Le maître d'hôtel
- Jean Hébey as L'hôtelière
- Jean Témerson as Le portier du 'Magic'
- Jacques Dynam as Un marin
- Max Elloy as Le garçon de restaurant
- Daniel Ivernel as American Officer
- François Joux as L'architecte
- Geneviève Morel as La mère dans le tarin

== Reception ==
Manon premiered on March 9, 1949, and won the Golden Lion at the Venice Film Festival. It achieved commercial success in France, attracting over 3 million admissions. The film also won the Best Film award from the French Syndicate of Cinema Critics in the same year.

Contemporary reviews were mixed, with some praising its bold portrayal of post-war society. The New York Times called it a "strikingly candid picture" for its graphic recreation of postwar Paris’s demi-monde atmosphere. However, it critiqued the central romance, noting that the leads "carry no conviction of any more than a vigorous puppy love." The review praised supporting performances by Serge Reggiani and Raymond Souplex with "considerable élan."

In France, the film provoked controversy for its overt sexuality and depiction of post-Occupation society as a "festering dung heap." Critic Jean d’Yvoire criticized its pessimism, stating there is not "a single sympathetic character" and that Clouzot remains "the pessimist we already know." Ado Kyrou praised its romanticism, describing Manon’s pursuit of love as "in total ignorance of evil" and an "instinctive negation of ‘sin’."

Modern assessments view it as unjustly overshadowed by Clouzot’s thrillers like Les Diaboliques. Film critic Emanuel Levy graded it B, calling it a "minor work" elevated by strong performances and striking scenes like the church meeting. Dennis Schwartz assigned it C+, describing it as one of Clouzot’s "lesser efforts" with an "inept screenplay" and "sketchy characters." FrenchFilms.org lauded it as one of Clouzot’s finest, praising its "honest depiction" of post-Occupation France and its "humanity, intelligence and sheer artistic brilliance."

== Analysis ==
Manon updates Abbé Prévost’s 1731 novel Manon Lescaut to post-Liberation France, exploring national identity, ethnicity, and gender. Scholars view it as one of the first films to critically engage with the Liberation, depicting societal alienation and attempts at retrieving home. Scholar Thomas Wynn examines Manon’s hair as a symbol of desire and specularity, marking her transformation from collaborator to prostitute to victim. This extends the novel’s mythology through cinematic visuals, drawing on Maupassant’s critique of the heroine as a disembodied seductress. The film blurs boundaries between nature/culture and human/animal, incorporating psychoanalytic themes of the male gaze.

Scholar K.H. Adler discusses how it reflects problems of living and loving in a post-war society recovering from occupation. Manon’s agency in prostitution challenges patriarchal norms, oscillating between femme fatale and feminist heroine. The Jewish refugee subplot underscores France’s role in Zionism and transnational displacement. Clouzot’s adaptation embodies patterns of desire and betrayal in a patriarchal context. The film’s dual settings—post-war Paris black markets and the Palestine desert—highlight futility in seeking paradise amid societal upheaval.

== Bibliography ==
- Lloyd, Christopher. Henri-Georges Clouzot. Manchester University Press, 2007.
