= Man to Men =

1948 film

- Directed by: Christian-Jaque
- Written by: Christian Jaque; Charles Spaak
- Produced by: Sacha Gordine
- Starring: Jean-Louis Barrault; Bernard Blier; Hélène Perdrière
- Cinematography: Christian Matras
- Edited by: Jacques Desagneaux
- Music by: Joseph Kosma
- Production company: Réalisation d'art cinématographique
- Distributed by: Réalisation d'art cinématographique
- Release date: 1 October 1948
- Running time: 96 minutes
- Countries: France; Switzerland
- Language: French

Man to Men (French: D'homme à hommes) is a 1948 French-Swiss historical drama film directed by Christian-Jaque and starring Jean-Louis Barrault, Bernard Blier and Hélène Perdrière. It was shot at the Billancourt Studios in Paris. The film's sets were designed by the art director Robert Gys.

== Plot ==
The film depicts Henri Dunant and the founding of the Red Cross in the nineteenth century after he had witnessed the suffering of troops at the Battle of Solferino. He wins the support of the wealthy Elsa Kastner, but faces ruin and disgrace at the hands of his creditors. Decades later, after years of obscurity, he is awarded the first Nobel Peace Prize in 1901.

== Cast ==
- Jean-Louis Barrault as Henri Dunant
- Bernard Blier as Coquillet
- Hélène Perdrière as Elsa Kastner
- Denis d'Inès as Guillaume-Henri Dufour
- Berthe Bovy as Dunant's mother
- Maurice Escande as Jérôme de Lormel
- Jean Debucourt as Napoleon III
- René Arrieu as Attia
- Serge Emrich as Jean Kastner
- Geneviève Morel as Amélie Coquillet
- Carmen Boni as Tamberlani
- Abel Jacquin as Meynier
- Louis Seigner as Philibert Routorbe
- Georges Le Roy as Le président du tribunal
