= Rome Express (1950 film) =

1950 film

- Directed by: Christian Stengel
- Written by: Philippe Brunet; Carlo Rim; Christian Stengel; Solange Térac
- Produced by: Aimé Frapin
- Starring: Hélène Perdrière; Jean Debucourt; Denise Grey; Saturnin Fabre
- Cinematography: René Gaveau
- Edited by: Claude Nicole
- Music by: Georges Van Parys
- Production companies: E.T.P.C.; Consortium du Films
- Distributed by: Consortium du Film
- Release date: 18 January 1950
- Running time: 83 minutes
- Country: France
- Language: French

Rome Express is a 1950 French comedy thriller film directed by Christian Stengel and starring Hélène Perdrière, Jean Debucourt and Denise Grey. It was shot at the Franstudio complex at Joinville Studios in Paris. The film's sets were designed by the art director Robert Hubert. Although using a similar theme and location, it is not a remake of the 1932 British film Rome Express.

== Synopsis ==
Five women are invited by a mysterious correspondent to catch a train from Paris to Rome. They begin to disappear one by one from the sleeping car, and Inspector Giovanni investigate the mysterious situation with many potential suspects on board.

== Cast ==
- Hélène Perdrière as Hélène
- Jean Debucourt as Lacaze
- Denise Grey as Margot
- Saturnin Fabre as le professeur
- Arthur Devère as Jeff Lambick
- Jacqueline Pierreux as Nicole
- Charles Dechamps as Delafosse
- Robert Pizani as Cornaglia
- Jean Tissier as Giovanni
- Jacqueline Dor as Denise
- Roger Caccia as Pigeonnet
- Mario Podesta as Valentino
- Philippe Clay as un employé de la SNCF
- René Hell as Le manager
- Georges Paulais as Le commissaire
- Madeleine Barbulée as la libraire
- Nicolas Amato
- Jacky Blanchot
- Julien Maffre

== Bibliography ==
- Rège, Philippe. Encyclopedia of French Film Directors, Volume 1. Scarecrow Press, 2009.
