= The Terrible Lovers =

1936 film by Marc Allégret

- Directed by: Marc Allégret
- Written by: Irma von Cube; Claude-André Puget; Jan Lustig; Noël Coward (play)
- Starring: Gaby Morlay; André Luguet; Marie Glory
- Cinematography: Louis Née; Armand Thirard
- Edited by: Yvonne Martin; Marguerite Renoir
- Music by: Billy Colson; Maurice Thiriet
- Production company: Paris Ciné Films
- Distributed by: Pathé Consortium Cinéma
- Release date: 21 August 1936
- Running time: 86 minutes
- Country: France
- Language: French

The Terrible Lovers (French: Les amants terribles) is a 1936 French comedy film directed by Marc Allégret and starring Gaby Morlay, André Luguet and Marie Glory. It is based on Noël Coward's play Private Lives. The film's sets were designed by the art director Guy de Gastyne.

== Synopsis ==
After many rows Annette and Daniel Fournier get divorced. They then go off with Victor and Lucie, respectively. Unexpectedly, during a holiday, the two couples find themselves at the same hotel. Annette and David begin to rekindle their former love for each other.

== Cast ==
- Gaby Morlay as Annette Fournier
- André Luguet as Daniel Fournier
- Marie Glory as Lucie
- Henri Guisol as Victor
- Charles Granval as Le clochard
- Henri Crémieux as L'avocat de Daniel
- Robert Vattier as L'avocat de Annette
- Raymond Aimos as Un gendarme
- Henri Vilbert as Un gendarme
- Robert Goupil as Le gardien du Palais
- Arthur Devère as Le portier de l'hôtel
- Sinoël
- Émile Genevois
- Guy Rapp

== Bibliography ==
- James Robert Parish. Film Actors Guide. Scarecrow Press, 1977.
