= Georges Auric =

French composer (1899–1983)

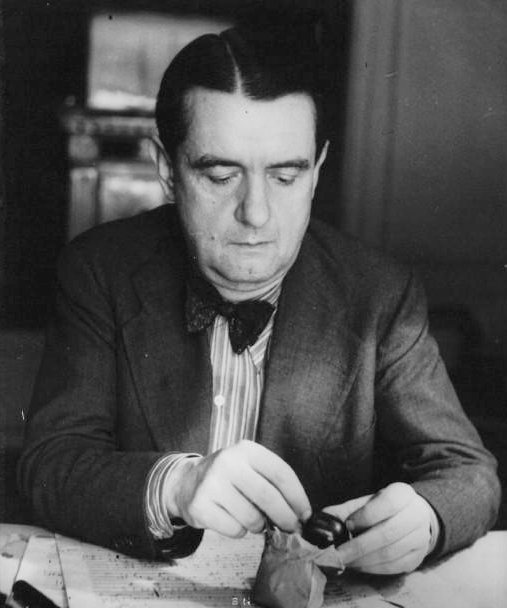
- Born: 15 February 1899; Lodève, Hérault, France
- Died: 23 July 1983 (aged 84); Paris, France

Georges Abel Louis Auric (French: [ʒɔʁʒ ɔʁik]; 15 February 1899 – 23 July 1983) was a French composer. After studying at the music college in Montpellier he was for a time a protégé of Erik Satie, who later renounced him. He became one of Les Six, a group of composers informally associated with Jean Cocteau. Before he turned twenty he had written incidental music for several ballets and stage productions.

Auric's early compositions were avant garde in nature, but in the 1930s he became convinced that it was a composer's duty to appeal to the broad musical public, and his style became more populist.

In addition to his works for the concert hall and the musical theatre, Auric had a long career as a film composer, writing scores for French, American and British films. In his later years he became a musical administrator, in charge of both the major opera houses in Paris.

== Life and career ==
=== Early years ===
Auric was born on 15 February 1899 in Lodève, Hérault in southern France. When he was about three years old his parents moved to the nearby city of Montpellier where he spent his childhood and stayed until 1913. His mother was musical and arranged for him to have violin lessons, but he did not take to them and turned instead to the piano.

When Auric was eight he began studying at the Conservatoire de Montpelier under a well-known piano professor, Louis Combes, who introduced him to the music of Bach, Mozart and Beethoven, as well as contemporary composers including Debussy, Ravel and Stravinsky. A performance of Berlioz's Symphonie fantastique by a visiting Viennese orchestra was a revelation to Auric, who was frustrated by having little opportunity to hear orchestral music. A musical discovery that proved important for him was the piano music of Erik Satie, which he encountered by chance. It struck him deeply, despite the prevailing view of Satie as a lightweight musical joker.

Combes was not only a musical mentor to Auric, but introduced him to the works of many modern poets and authors including Maurice Maeterlinck, Remy de Gourmont, Saint-Pol-Roux, Francis Vielé-Griffin. After discussing the boy's musical future with the musical scholar Léon Vallas, Auric's parents moved the family to Paris so that he could enrol at the Conservatoire de Paris

=== Paris ===
Auric studied at the Conservatoire with Georges Caussade and André Gedalge, and met three future fellow members of Les Six – Arthur Honegger, Darius Milhaud and Germaine Tailleferre. The composers Florent Schmitt and Charles Koechlin took a great interest in him, as did Albert Roussel, who in 1914 arranged a performance of his songs Trois interludes, described by Grove's Dictionary of Music and Musicians as "a charming work of remarkable maturity". Roussell wrote to Koechlin comparing Auric with the teenage prodigy of French poetry, Arthur Rimbaud. (Note: Auric had already set a verse by Rimbaud: Tête de faune in 1912 or early 1913.)

At the age of fourteen Auric gave a piano recital at the Société musicale indépendante. Several of his songs were performed in the following year at the Société Nationale de Musique. After his studies at the conservatoire Auric enrolled at the Schola Cantorum de Paris studying composition with Vincent d'Indy and Roussel.

Auric, caricatured by Jean Cocteau, 1921

In 1916 Auric left the Schola Cantorum and joined the French army. He was fortunate to escape serving in the trenches, and served under a music-loving general, entertaining the troops. Auric's early compositions were marked by a reaction against the musical establishment of France and Europe in general. Because of this and his association with Satie, Auric was named by the influential music critic, Henri Collet, in 1920, as one of a group of modernist French composers, whom he dubbed Les Six, along with Honegger, Milhaud, Tailleferre, Francis Poulenc and Louis Durey. Grove comments that the style of his music – "brilliant and often acidly aggressive" shows how, along with Poulenc, was the group’s most typical representative.

In 1921 Cocteau asked him to write the music for his ballet, Les Mariés de la tour Eiffel. He found himself short of time, and asked his fellow composers of Les Six to contribute some music. All except Durey agreed. In 1922 both he and Poulenc became estranged from Satie, who was hypersensitive and quick to turn from approval to censure. The younger composers' success with new ballets for Sergei Diaghilev – Les Biches for Poulenc and Les Fâcheux for Auric – won them the friendship of the critic Louis Laloy, a writer whom Satie regarded with implacable enmity.

Auric wrote a one-act opera Sous le masque (1927) (an earlier opera, La Reine de coeur (1919), is lost). In 1927 he contributed the Rondeau for the children's ballet L'Éventail de Jeanne ("Jean's Fan"), a ten-movement collaboration between ten French composers.

=== 1930s ===
Following his early successes as an avant-garde composer, Auric went through a transitional period during the 1930s. With the advent of sound films he was approached to score Cocteau’s innovative cinematic fantasy Le Sang d'un poète (Blood of a Poet, 1930) and in complete contrast the following year, René Clair’s À Nous la Liberté – a combination of social satire and musical comedy. Both Clair's film and Auric's music for it were well received. Between 1935 and 1938 Auric wrote the music for fourteen films by French directors.

While Auric was beginning a successful career as a film composer, his other music went through a fallow period. His Piano Sonata (1931) was poorly received. Grove says of it:

A new expressionism and seriousness of purpose is evident in his Piano Sonata (1930–31), a work that interested Dukas and Cortot, though it did not have the success the composer hoped for. In this sprawling work, Les Six is largely forgotten in favour of Skryabin and a grandiloquence of rhetoric.

Its failure was followed by five years in which Auric wrote little concert music. From the mid-1930s he took a more populist approach to composing. He became associated with left-wing groups and publications, including the Association des Ecrivains et des Artistes Révolutionnaires (AEAR), the Maison de la Culture, and the Fédération Musicale Populaire. He adopted four strategies to composing; first, to participate in groups with other progressive artists; secondly, to reach a wider audience by writing in more genres; thirdly, to write music aimed at a younger audience; and fourthly, to express his political views more directly in his music. He wrote in 1937 that there was a vast public that had the right to share in the joy of music:

and are we certain that everything is being done to allow them to do so? … It is no longer a question of reserving for some people the joy of "our" music. Tomorrow more than ever, it must be, it will be the grand source of youth and strength, the harmonious dispenser of beauty and hope. May everybody, simply, choose to participate in a necessary work.

Auric's choice of film commissions was influenced by these new-found beliefs, as well as by old associations. He collaborated with Cocteau on eleven films. He composed music for many films over the years, including productions in France, England and America. Among his most popular scores is that for Moulin Rouge. The song from that film, "Where is Your Heart?", became very popular and was recorded by numerous performers within weeks of the film's release. Poulenc said of it, "There is nothing like a catchy tune and this one is certainly catchy".

=== Administrator and music critic ===
In 1962 Auric changed from writing for the cinema when he became a senior musical administrator, as what Grove describes as "a vigorous and galvanizing director of the Paris Opéra and the Opéra-Comique", serving from 1962 to 1968. He succeeded Honegger as chairman of SACEM, the French performing rights society.

Music criticism was another major facet of Auric's career. His criticism was focused on promoting the ideals of Les Six and Cocteau, known as esprit nouveau. Specifically, his criticism focused on the perceived pretentiousness of Debussy, Wagner, Saint-Saëns, and Massenet, as well as the music of those who followed their styles. Cocteau, Les Six, and Auric found the music of those composers to be divorced from reality and instead preferred music that was grounded in populism.

=== Politics and personal life ===
Although Auric ridiculed Satie in the 1920s for joining the French Communist Party, he became associated with several left-wing groups and contributed to the communist newspapers Marianne and Paris-Soir in the 1930s.The Association des Ecrivains et des Artistes Révolutionnaires (AEAR) was dedicated to bringing together Soviet and French communist artists to discuss their goals and approaches for disseminating their ideas to the public. It was through this group that Auric met many other left-wing artists and thinkers. These ideals transferred into Auric's concert music as well as his choices of film commissions.

In 1930 Auric married the painter Eleanore Vilter. It was a long-lived and happy marriage, although far from conventional. Auric was a workaholic and evidently content to let his wife distract herself with extramarital affairs, notably with their chauffeur.

In his last years Auric divided his time between his native Midi and his flat on the Rive Droite in Paris. His wife died in 1982 and he began a relationship with a singer fifty years his junior, whom he married in June of that year. After a six-month decline, during which his mental capacities began to fail him, he died in the Paris flat on 23 July 1983 at the age of 84. He was interred at Montparnasse Cemetery, beside his first wife.

== Selected works ==
- Trois Interludes for piano and voice (1914)
- Huit Poèmes de Jean Cocteau for piano and voice (1918)
- Adieu, New-York! for piano (1919)
- Prélude for piano (1919)
- Les joues en feu for piano and voice (1920)
- Ouverture and Ritournelle from Les Mariés de la Tour Eiffel for orchestra (1920)
- Pastorales for piano (1920)
- Sonatine for piano (1922)
- Les Fâcheux (Ballet) (1923)
- Cinq Bagatelles for piano 4 hands (1925)
- Les Matelots (Ballet) (1925)

== Selected filmography ==
A more complete list is in the French Wikipedia article on Georges Auric (in French).

- Le sang d'un poète (1930)
- À nous la liberté (1931)
- Lake of Ladies (1934)
- The Mysteries of Paris (1935)
- The Messenger (1937)
- The Alibi (1937)
- The Red Dancer (1937)
- A Picnic on the Grass (1937)
- Tamara (1938)
- The Lafarge Case (1938)
- His Uncle from Normandy (1939)
- Monsieur La Souris (1942)
- The Beautiful Adventure (1942)
- The Murderer is Afraid at Night (1942)
- L'Éternel retour (1943)
- François Villon (1945)
- Farandole (1945)
- Dead of Night (1945)
- Beauty and the Beast (1946)
- Pastoral Symphony (1946)
- Hue and Cry (1947)
- The Seventh Door (1947)
- Desert Wedding (1948)
- To the Eyes of Memory (1948)
- Passport to Pimlico (1948)
- Ruy Blas (1948)
- Maya (1949)
- The Queen of Spades (1949)
- Silent Dust (1949)
- The Spider and the Fly (1949)
- Orpheus (1950)
- The Lavender Hill Mob (1951)
- Darling Caroline (1951)
- The Galloping Major (1951)
- The Lovers of Bras-Mort (1951)
- The Respectful Prostitute (1952)
- Moulin Rouge (1952)
- Leathernose (1952)
- The Titfield Thunderbolt (1953)
- Roman Holiday (1953)
- The Slave (1953)
- The Wages of Fear (1953)
- The Divided Heart (1954)
- Nagana (1955)
- Chéri-Bibi (1955)
- Lola Montes (1955)
- Rififi (1955)
- The Hunchback of Notre Dame (1956)
- Bonjour Tristesse (1958)
- The Night Heaven Fell (1958)
- Next to No Time (1958)
- Sergeant X (1960)
- Final Accord (1960)
- Goodbye Again (1961)
- The Innocents (1961)
- The Mind Benders (1963)
- The Poppy Is Also a Flower (1966)
- The Christmas Tree (1969)

== See also ==
- List of French composers

== Notes, references and sources ==
=== Sources ===
- Auric, Georges (1979). Quand j'etais la (in French). Paris: Bernard Grasset. ISBN 978-2-246-00793-7.
- Roust, Colin (2009). "Say it with Georges Auric: Film Music and the Esprit Nouveau". Twentieth-Century Music. 6: 133–153. (subscription required)
- Roust, Colin (2012). "Reaching a Plus Grand Public: Georges Auric as Populist". The Musical Quarterly. 95: 343–367. (subscription required)
- Roust, Colin (2020). Georges Auric: A Life in Music and Politics. New York: Oxford University Press. ISBN 978-0-19-060779-1.
- Shapiro, Robert (2011). "Georges Auric". Les Six: The French Composers and their Mentors, Jean Cocteau and Erik Satie. London and Chicago: Peter Owen. ISBN 978-0-7206-1293-6.
- Schmidt, Carl B (2001). Entrancing Muse: A Documented Biography of Francis Poulenc. Hillsdale: Pendragon Press. ISBN 978-1-57647-026-8.
