= Arthur Devère =

Belgian actor

- Born: Arthur Opdeweerdt; 24 June 1883; Brussels, Belgium
- Died: 23 September 1961 (aged 78); Brussels, Belgium
- Occupation: Actor
- Years active: 1913–1956

Arthur Devère (French pronunciation: [aʁtyʁ dəvɛʁ]; 24 June 1883 – 23 September 1961) was a Belgian film actor. He appeared in more than 50 films between 1913 and 1956.

== Selected filmography ==
- L'agent Rigolo et son chien policier (1913)
- Flup chasseur (1920)
- L'héritier (1921) - Meunier
- Arthur fait du film (1921)
- The Marriage of Mademoiselle Beulemans (1932) - Isidore
- Take Care of Amelie (1932) - Van Putzeboum
- Jeunes filles en liberté (1933)
- The Guardian Angel (1934) - L'aveugle
- Carnival in Flanders (1935) - Le poissonnier / The Fishmonger
- Martha (1936) - Le fermier Plunkett
- The Terrible Lovers (1936) - Le portier de l'hôtel
- Wolves Between Them (1936) - Le garçon du Vaterland
- A Legionnaire (1936) - Vandercleef
- The Man of the Hour (1937) - L'opérateur
- Widow's Island (1937)
- The Men Without Names (1937) - Schumbe, l'ordonnance
- Miarka (1937)
- Mollenard (1938) - Joseph
- Grisou (1938) - Carbouille
- Barnabé (1938)
- The Little Thing (1938) - Barbette
- Café de Paris (1938) - Le monsieur de Rouen
- La Piste du sud (1938) - Gingembre
- Ernest the Rebel (1938) - L'amiral
- La goualeuse (1938) - Pastoureau
- Fort Dolorès (1939) - Le général
- The End of the Day (1939) - Le régisseur
- L'entraîneuse (1939) - Raymond, le domestique
- Le Jour se lève (1939) - Mr. Gerbois
- Le club des fadas (1939)
- Girls in Distress (1939) - Le père d'Alice
- Bach en correctionnelle (1940) - L'huissier
- L'empreinte du Dieu (1940)
- Fromont jeune et Risler aîné (1941) - Gardinois
- Who Killed Santa Claus? (1941) - Tairraz, l'horloger (uncredited)
- Ici l'on pêche (1941) - Pierre
- Caprices (1942) - Le régisseur
- The Strangers in the House (1942) - Le docteur (uncredited)
- It Happened at the Inn (1943) - Goupi-Mes-Sous
- Secret Documents (1945)
- The Last Metro (1945)
- Bifur 3 (1945) - Napoléon
- Le destin s'amuse (1946) - Le gardien
- The Eleven O'Clock Woman (1948) - L'éclusier
- The Mystery of the Yellow Room (1949) - Père Jacques
- The Farm of Seven Sins (1949) - Frémont
- The Perfume of the Lady in Black (1949) - Père Jacques
- Rome Express (1950) - Jeff Lambick
- The Little Zouave (1950) - Le père Aubin
- Véronique (1950) - Le cocher
- Juliette, or Key of Dreams (1951) - Le marchand de souvenirs
- Paris Still Sings (1951) - Le commissaire (uncredited)
- Le Plaisir (1952) - Le contrôleur du train (segment "La Maison Tellier")
- The House on the Dune (1952) - César
- The Smugglers' Banquet (1952) - Gus
- My Wife, My Cow and Me (1952)
- Follow That Man (1953) - M. Forgeat
- Their Last Night (1953) - Le marinier
- The Unfrocked One (1954) - Le défroqué alcoolique
- Death on the Run (1954) - Le détective
- Le circuit de minuit (1956) - Godelet
