= Denise Grey =

Italian-French actress (1896–1996)

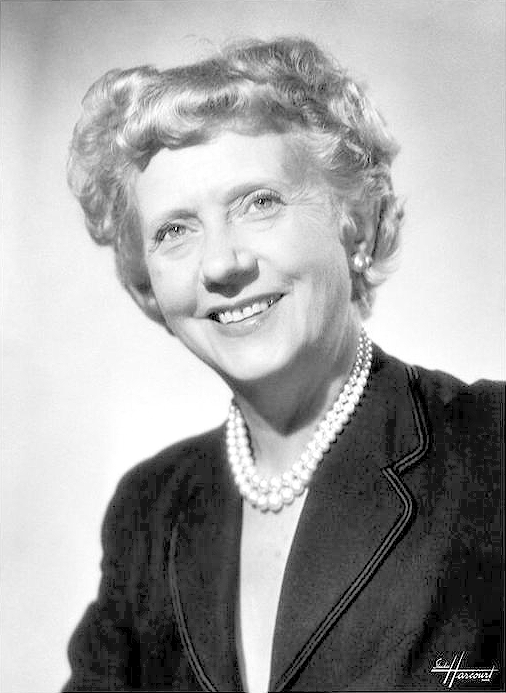
- Grey in 1950 (Studio Harcourt)
- Born: Édouardine Verthuy; 17 September 1896; Châtillon, Aosta Valley, Italy
- Died: 13 January 1996 (aged 99); Paris, France
- Occupation: Actress
- Children: Suzanne Grey

Denise Grey (born Édouardine Verthuy; 17 September 1896 – 13 January 1996) was an Italian-born actress who became a naturalized French citizen.

== Biography ==

Édouardine Grey was born in Châtillon in the Aosta Valley of north-west Italy, close to the French border. The town at the time primarily spoke the Valdôtain dialect. She was naturalized as a French citizen on 13 July 1922. She started working in the film industry in 1915 in the silent film En famille, an adaptation of the novel by Hector Malot, before dedicating herself to theatre work. She went back to working in films, now talkies, in the 1930s. She came to fame in the 1940s with films such as Monsieur Hector (1940), Boléro (1942) or Devil in the Flesh (1947). Old age did not end her career. For example, in 1972, she starred in a French television series called Les Rois maudits. Thanks to the film La Boum, in which she plays "Poupette", the great-grandmother of Sophie Marceau, she gained recognition from a new audience growing up in the 1980s. In 1986, she sang Devenir vieux (Becoming Old).

She was a member of the Comédie-Française between 1944 and 1946 and between 1957 and 1958.

== Personal life ==
She had a daughter: Suzanne Grey, also an actress, who was born on 28 June 1917 and died on 13 December 2005.

== Death ==
She died in 1996, a few months before reaching the age of 100. She rests next to her husband in the cemetery of Arradon (Morbihan).

== Selected filmography ==
- Nemrod et compagnie (1916) - Esther Nuno
- Les bleus de l'amour (1918) - Mimi Bertin
- Honneur d'artiste (1920) - Miss Nicholson
- Jeunes filles à marier (1935)
- The Lady from Vittel (1937) - Mme Bleu
- Trois artilleurs au pensionnat (1937) - Hortense, deuxième institrice
- Trois artilleurs à l'opéra (1938) - Paulette
- Serge Panine (1939) - Lady Harton
- Monsieur Hector (1940) - Maroussia de Dragomir
- Montmartre sur Seine (1941) - Moussette
- L'oasis dans la tourmente (1942)
- Bolero (1942) - Anne-Marie Houiller
- Romance for Three (1942) - Loys Erland
- The Blue Veil (1942) - Madame Volnar-Bussel
- The Honourable Catherine (1943) - Madame d'Ambroisie
- Des jeunes filles dans la nuit (1943) - La mère d'Andrée
- Vingt-cinq ans de bonheur (1943) - Élisabeth Castille
- Retour de flamme (1943) - Madame de Nogrelles
- Goodbye Leonard (1943) - Bernardine Léonard - la femme insupportable et dépensière de Félicien
- L'aventure est au coin de la rue (1944) - Madame Laurat-Dossin
- Majestic Hotel Cellars (1945) - Madame Van Bell
- L'extravagante mission (1945) - Mme Brockseller
- Madame et son flirt (1946) -La pseudo-cousine Léa
- Strange Fate (1946) - Madame d'Evremond
- The Ideal Couple (1946) - Antoinette
- L'insaisissable Frédéric (1946) - Miss Baxter
- On demande un ménage (1946) - Sabine Robinet
- Six heures à perdre (1947) - Mme. de Witt
- Devil in the Flesh (1947) - Madame Grangier
- Four Knaves (1947) - Madame de la Bastide
- Coincidences (1947) - Madame Bardolas
- Et dix de der (1948) - Betty
- Une femme par jour (1949) - La duchesse
- Bonheur en location (1949) - Gilde
- Rome Express (1950) - Margot
- Not Any Weekend for Our Love (1950) - Gabrielle, fille du baron
- La ronde des heures (1950) - Madame Méry-Mirecourt
- My Friend Sainfoin (1950) - La mère d'Eugénie
- Blonde (1950) - Isabelle Truche
- Tomorrow We Get Divorced (1951) - Mme Tourelle
- The Little Cardinals (1951) - Mme Cardinal
- Allô... je t'aime (1952) - Mme Dupuis
- Article 519, Penal Code (1952) - Madre di Clara
- The Tour of the Grand Dukes (1953) - La baronne
- The Father of the Girl (1953) - Isabelle Marinier
- Dortoir des grandes (1953) - Mme. Hazard-Habran - La directrice
- Julieta (1953) - Mme Valender - la mère de Julietta et Martine
- The Pirates of the Bois de Boulogne (1954) - Mme. Grossac
- The Sheep Has Five Legs (1954) - Mme Durand-Perrin, la mère
- Rasputin (1954) - La princesse Dikvona
- Poisson d'avril (1954) - Clémentine Prévost
- El torero (1954) - (uncredited)
- Service Entrance (1954) - Madame Thévenot
- Il seduttore (1954) - Jacqueline's Mother
- Fantaisie d'un jour (1954) - Mme. de Cédillon
- Spring, Autumn and Love (1955) - La cliente
- La villa Sans-Souci (1955)
- La rue des bouches peintes (1955) - Winifred
- L'auberge en folie (1956) - La grand-mère
- Mitsou (1956) - Estelle
- Une nuit aux Baléares (1957) - Marguerite Vargas
- La peau de l'ours (1957) - Mme Legrand, la belle-mère
- On Foot, on Horse, and on Wheels (1957) - Marguerite Martin
- Sylviane de mes nuits (1957) - Mme Anita de Santos
- Carve Her Name with Pride (1958) - Mrs. Bushell
- It's All Adam's Fault (1958) - Jeanne Sandret
- Police judiciaire (1958) - Madame Jambert
- Le tombeur (1958) - Natacha Olivaro
- Mimi Pinson (1958) - La grand-mère
- A Dog, a Mouse, and a Sputnik (1958) - Marguerite Martin
- Le confident de ces dames (1959) - La comtesse de Corte Bianca
- Bombs on Monte Carlo (1960) - Contesse Tamm
- Le panier à crabes (1960) - L'impresario
- Love and the Frenchwoman (1960) - Danielle's mother (segment "Divorce, Le")
- La Bonne Soupe (1964) - Mme Boudard mère
- Pas de caviar pour tante Olga (1965) - Mrs. Dumont-Freville
- La maison de campagne (1969) - La baronne de Bocquigny
- Hello-Goodbye (1970) - Concierge
- Mais qui donc m'a fait ce bébé? (1971)
- Les Rois maudits (1972, TV Mini-Series) - Mme de Hongrie
- La boum (1980) - Poupette
- N'oublie pas ton père au vestiaire... (1982) - La dame à la moto
- La Boum 2 (1982) - Poupette
- En cas de guerre mondiale, je file à l'étranger (1983) - Madame Toussaint mère
- Le voleur de feuilles (1984) - Isabelle Debecker
- Le gaffeur (1985) - La mère de Gabriel
- Les saisons du plaisir (1988) - Emmanuelle de La Grandière Van Bergh
- A Fine Romance (1991) - Madame Legris
