= Dunantist =

Type of humanitarian organization

Dunantist is a category of humanitarian organization named after Henry Dunant (1828–1910), who inspired the creation of the International Red Cross and Red Crescent Movement. Practitioners who fall into this category follow the traditional, or classic, approach to humanitarianism, which comprises four fundamental principles:

- Humanity – alleviate human suffering wherever it may be found
- Neutrality – do not take sides in a conflict
- Impartiality – aid should be based on needs alone, regardless of race, class, gender and sex
- Independence – proactive disengagement from political and military actors to limit coercive control of the humanitarian actor's actions

Aside from strict adherence to the humanitarian principles that the Red Cross is based on, Dunantists also limit their actions to humanitarian crises.

== History ==
The term was coined by Abby Stoddard in the 2003 research article "Humanitarian NGOs: Challenges and Trends," published by the Humanitarian Policy Group of the Overseas Development Institute, which characterized humanitarian organizations by their principal values and operational approach.

Dunantist establishments are independent, neutral organizations that attempt to work outside the influence of a state. Médecins Sans Frontières is an example of a Dunantist humanitarian organization.

In contrast, "Wilsonian" organizations (named after United States president Woodrow Wilson) work in willing partnership with governments that seek to integrate foreign policy interests with aid activities. Wilsonian organizations differ from Dunantists in that they accept stronger state influence and accommodate political interests and specific foreign policy objectives. This type of humanitarianism emerged during the global war on terror, which merged the lines between the military, development, and humanitarian remits within a framework of stabilization and integrated missions carried out by the US, NATO, and UN. This is apparent in the way the military is increasingly called upon to protect aid organizations or to directly engage in humanitarian initiatives.

David Rieff, in his 2003 book A Bed for the Night, further elaborates on the two philosophies and demonstrates that the decline in Dunantist organizations will make it increasingly difficult for humanitarian values to prevail in challenging conflict settings.

== Other NGO types ==
Other examples of NGO types include:

- Solidarist – these organizations reject impartiality, and their humanitarian aid programmes follow a clear political point of view. The Norwegian People's Aid organization is an example.
- Faith-based – these organizations combine a religious mission or values with the provision of aid, such as Catholic Relief Services and World Vision.
- Commercial – these organizations are fully dependent on government funding as well as private enterprises and private military companies, with Halliburton as an example.

== See also ==
- International Committee of the Red Cross
- International Federation of Red Cross and Red Crescent Societies
