= Serge Reggiani =

Italian-French singer and actor (1922–2004)

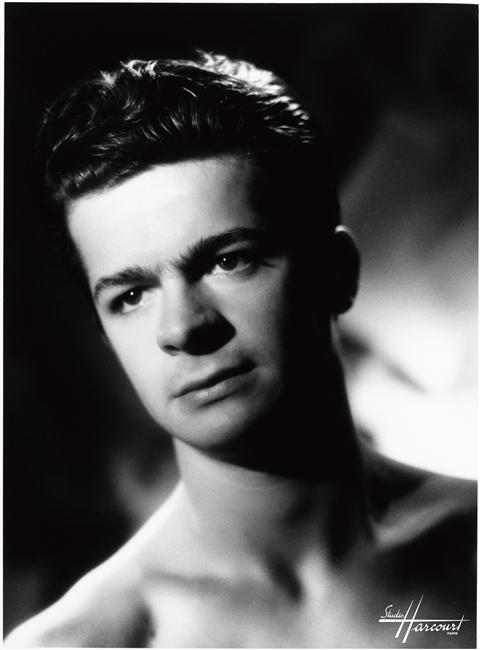

Background information
- Born: Sergio Reggiani; 2 May 1922; Reggio Emilia, Italy
- Died: 23 July 2004 (aged 82) Boulogne-Billancourt, France
- Genres: Chanson française
- Occupations: Singer, actor, painter
- Instrument: Vocals
- Years active: 1940–2004

Serge Reggiani (born Sergio Reggiani; 2 May 1922 – 23 July 2004) was an Italian-French actor and singer.

== Biography ==
=== Early life ===
Reggiani was born in Reggio Emilia, Italy, and moved to France with his parents at the age of eight. Initially he trained as a barber, like his father, before winning a place at drama school.

=== Acting career ===
After studying acting at the Conservatoire des arts cinématographiques, followed by the Conservatoire National des Arts Dramatiques, he was discovered by Jean Cocteau and appeared in the wartime production of Les Parents terribles. Subsequently he disappeared from Paris to join the French Resistance. (Note: Not a French citizen until 1948, Reggiani had refused conscription in the Italian army and was wanted for desertion.)

Returning to acting after the liberation, he scored a success on film in Les portes de la nuit ("Gates of the Night"), released in 1946. His films included Manon (1949), The Lovers of Verona (1949), La Ronde (1950) (as a soldier who falls for prostitute Simone Signoret), Casque d'or (1952) (again opposite Signoret), Les Misérables (1958), Tutti a casa (1960), Le Doulos (1963), The Leopard (1963), Army of Shadows (1969), Vincent, François, Paul and the Others (1974) and I Hired a Contract Killer (1990).

Reggiani also triumphed in the theatre in 1959 with his performance in Jean-Paul Sartre's play Les Séquestrés d'Altona. He also made some English-language films: a British production, Secret People (1952); (Note: During filming, Reggiani befriended journalist Lindsay Anderson who was documenting the shoot for a book, and hired him to help with a production of Hamlet he was mounting in Paris: Anderson went on to become an acclaimed stage director.) Act of Love (1953), a French-American co-production starring Kirk Douglas; and Paris Blues (1961) with Paul Newman and Sidney Poitier, filmed on location in Paris.

=== Singing career ===
In 1965, at the age of 43, he began a second career as a singer, encouraged by his friends Simone Signoret and her husband Yves Montand, and later with the assistance of the French singer Barbara. Reggiani became one of the more acclaimed performers of French chanson, and although he was in his 40s, his rugged image made him popular with both younger and older listeners. His best-known songs include Les loups sont entrés dans Paris ("The Wolves Have Entered Paris") and Sarah (La femme qui est dans mon lit) ("The Woman Who Is in My Bed"), the latter written by Georges Moustaki. He regularly sang songs by Boris Vian (Le Déserteur, Arthur où t'as mis le corps, La Java des bombes atomiques). His young fans identified with his left-wing ideals and anti-militarism, most notably during the student revolts in France in 1968. With age, he became acclaimed as one of the better interpreters of the chanson and for bringing the poems of Rimbaud, Apollinaire, and Prévert to new audiences.

=== Later life ===
From 1980, when his son Stéphan died, Reggiani struggled with alcoholism and depression. In the 1990s, however, he made a comeback to singing, giving concerts despite his declining health and personal distress, the last one being held as late as the spring of 2004.

In later life, he became a painter and gave a number of exhibitions of his works.

Reggiani died in Paris of a heart attack at the age of 82. He is buried in Montparnasse Cemetery.

=== Legacy ===
In the film Moi qui t'aimais (2025), a biopic of Signoret and Montand, Thierry de Peretti plays Reggiani.

== Selected filmography ==
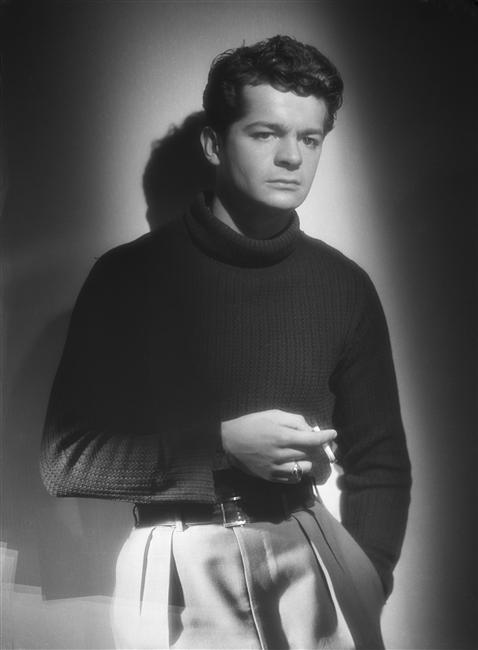
Studio Harcourt photo of Reggiani, 1943

- Boys' School (1938) – Pupil (uncredited)
- Conflict (1938) – (uncredited)
- Night in December (1940) – Un figurant
- Saturnin de Marseille (1941)
- Strange Inheritance (1943) – Bob Éloi
- Le carrefour des enfants perdus (1944) – Joris
- François Villon (1945) – François Villon
- Star Without Light (1946) – Gaston Lansac
- Gates of the Night (1946) – Guy Sénéchal
- Coincidences (1947) – Jean Ménétrier
- La fleur de l'âge (1947) - Petit-Louis
- Manù il contrabbandiere (1948) – Manuel Ambrosini, aka 'Manù'
- Under the Cards (1948) – Manu
- The Lovers Of Verona (1949) – Angelo (Romeo)
- Manon (1949) – Leon Lescaut
- The Mystery of the Yellow Room (1949) – Joseph Rouletabille
- Return to Life (1949) – Louis, young German girl's husband (segment 5: "Le retour de Louis")
- The Sinners (1949) – Pierre Massot
- The Perfume of the Lady in Black (1949) – Joseph Rouletabille
- La Ronde (1950) – Franz the Soldier
- Old Boys of Saint-Loup (1950) – L'abbé Paul Forestier
- Good Enough to Eat (1951) – Jean-Louis aka Loup
- Secret People (1952) – Louis
- Casque d'or (1952) – Georges Manda
- Red Shirts (Anita Garibaldi, 1952) – Lantini
- The King and the Mockingbird (1952) – The chimney sweep (voice)
- Storms (1953) – Sergio Parnell
- The World Condemns Them (1953) – André
- Act of Love (1953) – Claude Lacaud
- Napoléon (1955) – Lucien Bonaparte
- The Wicked Go to Hell (1955) – Rudel
- The Doll That Took the Town (1957) – Mario Grimaldi
- Élisa (1957) – Bernard Voisin
- Not Delivered (1958) – Bastien Sassey
- Les Misérables (1958) – Enjolras
- The Stowaway (1958) – Alfred Mougins
- Marie-Octobre (1959) – Antoine Rougier
- Everybody Go Home (1960) – Assunto Ceccarelli
- Paris Blues (1961) – Michel "Gypsy" Devigne
- Warriors Five (1962) – Libero
- Le Doulos (1962) – Maurice Faugel
- The Leopard (1963) – Don Francisco ("Ciccio") Tumeo
- L'enfer (1964) – Marcel #1
- Marie-Chantal contre le docteur Kha (1965) – Ivanov
- The 25th Hour (1967) – Trajan Koruga
- The Last Adventure (1967) – The pilot
- Il giorno della civetta (1968) – Parrinieddu
- The Seven Cervi Brothers (1968) – Inmate Ferrari
- Army of Shadows (L'Armée des ombres, 1969) – The hairdresser
- Comptes à rebours (1971) – François Nolan
- Trois milliards sans ascenseur (1972) – Pierrot
- Les Caïds (1972) – Thia
- Don't Touch the White Woman! (1974) – The Mad Indian
- Vincent, François, Paul... et les autres (1974) – Paul
- Le Chat et la souris (1975) – Lechat
- The Good and the Bad (1976) – Resistance leader
- Une fille cousue de fil blanc (1977) – Jérôme
- Violette & François (1977) – François's father
- Solemn Communion (1977) – Le récitant chanteur (voice)
- La terrazza (1980) – Sergio
- L'Empreinte des géants (1980) – Fouldroule
- Fantastica (1980) – Euclide Brown
- The Beekeeper (1986) – Sick Man
- Mauvais Sang (1986) – Charlie
- Let Sleeping Cops Lie (Ne réveillez pas un flic qui dort, 1988) – Le Stéphanois
- Coupe-franche (1989) – Mathieu
- There Were Days... and Moons (1990) – Sophie's father
- I Hired a Contract Killer (1990) – Vic of Vic's French Burgers
- Plein fer (1990) – Emilio
- De force avec d'autres (1993) – Sergio
- Rosenemil (1993) – Dr. Levy
- Le petit garçon (1995) – Germain
- Héroïnes (1997) – Montgolfier
- The Pianist (1998) – older Rossell
