= The Ideal Couple =

1946 film

- Directed by: Bernard-Roland; Raymond Rouleau
- Written by: André Cayatte; Pierre Léaud
- Starring: Raymond Rouleau; Hélène Perdrière; Denise Grey
- Cinematography: Claude Renoir
- Production company: S.U.F.
- Release date: 31 May 1946
- Running time: 92 minutes
- Country: France
- Language: French

The Ideal Couple (French: Le couple idéal) is a 1946 French comedy film directed by Bernard-Roland and Raymond Rouleau and starring Raymond Rouleau, Hélène Perdrière and Denise Grey.

== Cast ==
- Raymond Rouleau as Diavolo / Henri
- Hélène Perdrière as Diana
- Denise Grey as Antoinette
- Roger Blin as Le somnambule
- Maurice Bringo
- André Chanu as Tatave
- René-Jean Chauffard
- Max Dalban as Un ami d'Henri
- Guy Decomble as Un opérateur
- Paul Demange as Le metteur en scène de Justex
- Yves Deniaud as Julien
- Jacques Dynam
- Paul Frankeur as Le coiffeur
- Jean Lanier as Justex
- Fabien Loris as Le Chinois
- Maurice Marceau as Le régisseur
- Frédéric Mariotti as Le photographe
- Philippe Olive as Le producteur
- Jacqueline Pierreux as Pearl Black
- Annette Poivre as Titine
- Marcel Pérès as Le secrétaire du commissaire
- Fernand René as Le président
- Maurice Salabert
- Simone Signoret as Annette
- Sinoël as Le châtelain
- Jean-Marc Tennberg
- Marcel Vallée as Le metteur en scène de Diavolo
- Robert Vattier as Le commissaire
- Georges Vitsoris as Satanas

== Bibliography ==
- Rège, Philippe. Encyclopedia of French Film Directors, Volume 1. Scarecrow Press, 2009.
