= The Midnight Sun (1943 film) =

1943 film

- Directed by: Bernard-Roland
- Written by: Charles Exbrayat; Pierre Léaud
- Based on: The Midnight Sun by Pierre Benoît
- Produced by: Jean Clerc
- Starring: Jules Berry, Josseline Gaël; Sessue Hayakawa
- Cinematography: Jean Bachelet
- Edited by: Charlotte Guilbert
- Music by: Georges Van Parys
- Production company: Société Universelle de Films
- Distributed by: La Société des Films Sirius
- Release date: 30 June 1943
- Running time: 88 minutes
- Country: France
- Language: French

The Midnight Sun (French: Le soleil de minuit) is a 1943 French adventure film directed by Bernard-Roland and starring Jules Berry, Josseline Gaël and Sessue Hayakawa . It is based on the 1930 novel of the same title by Pierre Benoît. The film's sets were designed by the art director Robert Dumesnil.

== Cast ==
- Jules Berry as Forestier
- Josseline Gaël as La princesse Armide Irénieff
- Saturnin Fabre as Ireniev
- Sessue Hayakawa as Matsui
- Aimé Clariond as Grégor
- Marcel Vallée as Ivan Barinov
- Alexandre Rignault as Tchérensky
- Léon Belières as Le directeur de l'usine
- Camille Bert as Dumanoir
- Georges Péclet as Le capitaine Karovine
- Jean Morel as Schmidt
- André Carnège as Kouratov
- Georges Paulais as Kramer
- Léonce Corne as Le patron du 'Soleil de minuit'
- Marinette Frankel as Katia
- Alfred Baillou as Le secrétaire
- Henri Charrett as Un ingénieur
- Maurice Devienne as Un ingénieur
- Ky Duyen as Le japonais
- Maurice Picard as Un ingénieur
- Jacqueline Pierreux

== Bibliography ==
- Goble, Alan. The Complete Index to Literary Sources in Film. Walter de Gruyter, 1999.
- Miyao, Daisuke. Sessue Hayakawa: Silent Cinema and Transnational Stardom. Duke University Press, 2007.
