= Hélène Perdrière =

French actress

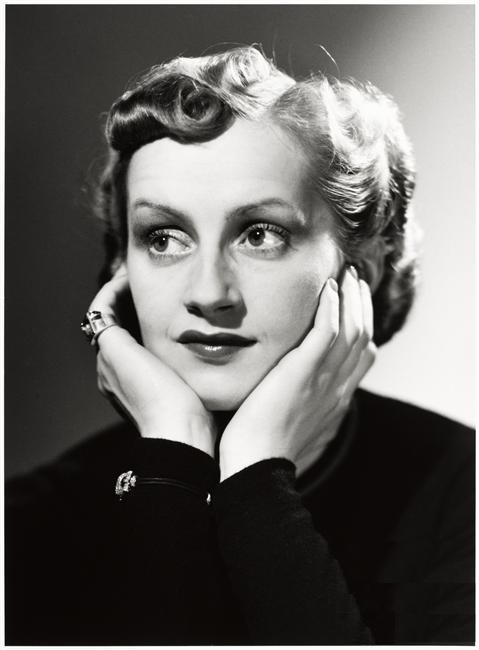
- Hélène Perdrière in 1938
- Born: 17 April 1912; Asnières; France
- Died: 27 August 1992 (aged 80); Hauts-de-Seine, Île-de-France; France
- Occupation: Film actress
- Years active: 1930 - 1980

Hélène Perdrière (17 April 1912 in Asnieres-sur-Seine – 27 August 1992 in Boulogne-Billancourt) was a French stage and film actress. After earning a first prize for comedy at the National Conservatory of Dramatic Art in 1928, she became the first resident of Comédie-French. She resigned to become the partner of Pierre Fresnay in the boulevard theaters of the time, before returning to the Comédie-French circuit in April 1952, and remaining until its end in December 1973. She then went on to play with the Renaud-Barrault Company until her retirement a year later. At the Comédie-French, she staged several plays of Marivaux. She was also an election interpreter.

== Filmography ==
Year	Title	Role	Notes
1930	Le Roi des resquilleurs	Lulu	
1932	La foule hurle	Anne	
1932	Mon coeur balance	Henriette	
1933	Criminal	Mary Brody	
1933	La merveilleuse tragédie de Lourdes	Odile Duprat	
1934	Jeanne	Evodie	
1935	Gangster malgré lui		
1935	The Squadron's Baby	Isabelle	
1935	La marmaille	Ninette	
1939	Three from St Cyr	Françoise le Moyne	
1946	Women's Games	Simone	
1946	The Ideal Couple	Diana	
1946	Night Warning	Hélène	
1948	Route sans issue	Evelyne Cléry	
1948	The Ironmaster	Claire de Beaulieu	
1948	Man to Men	Elsa Kastner	
1949	The Mystery of the Yellow Room	Mathilde Stangerson	
1949	The Perfume of the Lady in Black	Mathilde Stangerson - la fille de feu le professeur Stangerson	
1950	Rome Express	Éliane	
1950	The New Masters	Yvonne Durand	
1950	A Certain Mister	L'Index	
1950	Mystery in Shanghai	Floriane Aboody	
1951	Topaze	Suzy Courtois	
1956	If All the Guys in the World	Christine Largeau	
1974	The Phantom of Liberty	La vieille tante / Aunt	
