= Pierre Léaud =

French screenwriter and assistant director

- Born: 25 March 1909; Rennes, France
- Died: 5 November 1996 (aged 87); Falaise, France
- Occupations: Screenwriter, Actor, Assistant director
- Years active: 1931–1964 (film)

Pierre Léaud (25 March 1909 - 5 November 1996) was a French screenwriter, novelist and assistant director. He was married to the actress Jacqueline Pierreux with whom he had a son, actor Jean-Pierre Léaud.

== Selected filmography ==
=== Screenwriter ===
- A Caprice of Pompadour (1931)
- The Midnight Sun (1943)
- Échec au roy (1945)
- The Ideal Couple (1946)
- We Are Not Married (1946)
- Scandal (1948)
- Baron Tzigane (1954)
- One Bullet Is Enough (1954)
- Police judiciaire (1958)

=== Assistant director ===
- Les démons de l'aube (1946)
- Dédée d'Anvers (1948)
- The Lovers of Verona (1949)
- A Man Walks in the City (1950)
- We Are All Murderers (1952)

== Bibliography ==
- Baecque, Antoine de & Toubiana, Serge. Truffaut: A Biography. University of California Press, 2000.
