= André Bac =

French cinematographer

- Born: 14 December 1905; Paris, France
- Died: 31 May 1989 (aged 83); Paris, France
- Occupation: Cinematographer
- Years active: 1933-1972

André Bac (1905–1989) was a French cinematographer.

== Selected filmography ==
- The House of Mystery (1933)
- Honeymoon (1935)
- The Mutiny of the Elsinore (1936)
- The Forsaken (1937)
- If You Return (1938)
- That's Sport (1938)
- Le Jour Se Lève (1939)
- The Duraton Family (1939)
- Patrie (1946)
- Desert Wedding (1948)
- Daybreak (1949)
- The Perfume of the Lady in Black (1949)
- Good Lord Without Confession (1953)
- A Double Life (1954)
- Stain in the Snow (1954)
- The Affair of the Poisons (1955)
- Suspicion (1956)
- The Fenouillard Family (1960)
- Herr Puntila and His Servant Matti (1960)
- Carom Shots (1963)

== Bibliography ==
- Phillips, Alastair. City of Darkness, City of Light: Émigré Filmmakers in Paris, 1929-1939. Amsterdam University Press, 2004.
