= André Zwoboda =

French screenwriter, producer and film director

- Born: 3 March 1910; Paris, France
- Died: 12 May 1994 (aged 84); Dreux
- Occupations: Director, Producer, Writer
- Years active: 1936 - 1966 (film)

André Zwoboda (1910–1994) was a French screenwriter, producer and film director.

== Selected filmography ==
=== Director ===
- Life Belongs to Us (1936)
- Sideral Cruises (1942)
- Farandole (1945)
- François Villon (1945)
- The Seventh Door (1947)
- Desert Wedding (1948)
- Captain Ardant (1951)

=== Producer ===
- Black Girl (1966)

== Bibliography ==
- Rège, Philippe. Encyclopedia of French Film Directors, Volume 1. Scarecrow Press, 2009.
