= Les Inconnus dans la maison =

Les Inconnus dans la maison is a novel by Georges Simenon, first published in Paris in 1940.

It may also refer to several film adaptations of the novel:

- Les Inconnus dans la maison, a 1942 French film directed by Henri Decoin
- Stranger in the House, a 1967 British film directed by Pierre Rouve
- L'Inconnu dans la maison, a 1992 French film directed by Georges Lautner
- Stranger in the House, a 1997 Canadian-American film directed by Rodney Gibbons
