= Stranger in the House =

Stranger in the House may refer to:

- Stranger in the House (1967 film), a British crime film
- Stranger in the House (1992 film), a French crime drama
- Stranger in the House (1997 film), a thriller remake of the above
- Black Christmas (1974 film), retitled Stranger in the House for television screenings
- "Stranger in the House" (song), duet by Elvis Costello and George Jones
- Stranger in the House: The Collected Short Supernatural Fiction, Volume One , a 2010 short story collection by Lisa Tuttle
- "Stranger in the House" (A Touch of Frost), a 1994 television episode
- "Stranger in the House", the 24th episode of 1950s television anthology series, The Whistler
- A Stranger in the House, a 2017 novel by Shari Lapena

== See also ==
- The Strangers in the House, a 1940 novel by Belgian author Georges Simenon
  - The Strangers in the House (film), a 1942 French drama film based on said novel
