= Yvette Etiévant =

French actress (1922–2003)

- Born: 30 December 1922; Paris, France
- Died: 17 March 2003 (aged 80); France
- Occupation: Actress
- Years active: 1944-1995

Yvette Etiévant (1922–2003) was a French actress. She starred in Yves Robert's War of the Buttons (La Guerre des boutons) in 1962.

== Filmography ==
- 1945: Les Dames du bois de Boulogne (directed by Robert Bresson) - La bonne
- 1949: Between Eleven and Midnight (directed by Henri Decoin) - La fille qui tapine sous le tunnel routier
- 1949: Le Point du jour (directed by Louis Daquin)
- 1949: Last Love (directed by Jean Stelli) - Lina Bell
- 1949: The Perfume of the Lady in Black (directed by Louis Daquin) - Une fille à la soirée chez Rouletabille
- 1950: The Prize (directed by Jean Boyer) - Marie, la jeune paysanne
- 1951: Without Leaving an Address (directed by Jean-Paul Le Chanois) - Adrienne Gauthier, la femme d'Emile, le chauffeur de taxi
- 1951: Topaze (directed by Marcel Pagnol) - La dactylo de Topaze
- 1951: Journal d'un curé de campagne (directed by Robert Bresson) - la femme de ménage
- 1951: Skipper Next to God (directed by Louis Daquin) - La fille
- 1951: Under the Sky of Paris (directed by Julien Duvivier) - (uncredited)
- 1951: The Voyage to America (directed by Henri Lavorel) - La receveuse des postes
- 1951: Two Pennies Worth of Violets (directed by Jean Anouilh) - Lucienne Delbez
- 1951: Alone in Paris (directed by Hervé Bromberger) - Germaine
- 1952: Joceleyn (directed by Jacques de Casembroot) - Soeur Louise
- 1952: Nous sommes tous des assassins (directed by André Cayatte) - L'épouse de M. Bauchet
- 1952: Une fille dans le soleil (directed by Maurice Cam) - Paulette
- 1952: Les Dents longues (directed by Daniel Gélin) - Yvonne
- 1953: Les Compagnes de la nuit (directed by Ralph Habib) - La surveillante
- 1953: The Love of a Woman (directed by Jean Grémillon) - Fernande de Malgorny
- 1954: Royal Affairs in Versailles (directed by Sacha Guitry) - Une fille du peuple (uncredited)
- 1954: Le Fil à la patte (directed by Guy Lefranc) - Marceline
- 1955: Futures vedettes (directed by Marc Allégret) - Mme. Petersen - mère d'Elis
- 1955: Le Dossier noir (directed by André Cayatte) - Mme Pirion, la concierge du palais de justice
- 1956: Des gens sans importance (directed by Henri Verneuil) - Solange Viard, la femme du routier
- 1956: Crime and Punishment (directed by Georges Lampin) - Mme Marcellini
- 1956: La Roue (directed by André Haguet et Maurice Delbez) - Marcelle
- 1958: Jeux dangereux (directed by Pierre Chenal) - La mère de Fleur
- 1960: Les Yeux sans visage (directed by Georges Franju) - La mère
- 1960: Pantalaskas (directed by Paul Paviot) - Maria Clairgeon
- 1960: Le Dialogue des carmélites (directed by Philippe Agostini et le père Bruckberger) - Soeur Lucie, la tourière
- 1960: Les Vieux de la vieille (directed by Gilles Grangier) - Louise, la patronne du bistrot
- 1960: L'Ours (directed by Edmond Séchan) - Madame Médard
- 1960: La Mort de Belle (directed by Edouard Molinaro) - Alice, la secrétaire du juge
- 1962: War of the Buttons (directed by Yves Robert) - Mme Lebrac
- 1963: Le Jour et l'Heure (directed by René Clément) - La caissière de la pharmacie
- 1963: Thank You, Natercia (directed by Pierre Kast) - (uncredited)
- 1963: Graduation Year (directed by José-André Lacour) - Mme cachou
- 1964: Les Yeux cernés (directed by Robert Hossein) - L'hôtelière
- 1964: Mata Hari, agent H21 (directed by Jean-Louis Richard) - L'infirmière sur le front (uncredited)
- 1964: La Côte d'Adam (directed by Paule Senguissen) (Short) - voix uniquement
- 1965: La guerre est finie (directed by Alain Resnais) - Yvette, la femme de Ramon
- 1967: Antigone (directed by Jean Cocteau, d'après Sophocle), téléfilm directed by Jean-Claude de Nesle) - Eurycide
- 1968: L'Homme du Picardie (directed by Jacques Ertaud) - Thérèse Durtol
- 1968: Je t'aime, je t'aime (directed by Alain Resnais) - Germaine Coster, la confidente
- 1968: Provinces (émission "La mère") (directed by Robert Mazoyer) (TV Series)
- 1972: État de siège (directed by Costa-Gavras) - La femme du sénateur
- 1981: Sans Famille (directed by Jacques Ertaud) (TV Series) - Mère Barberin
- 1982: Les Misérables (directed by Robert Hossein) - La logeuse de Notre-Dame de Lorette
- 1983: Le Bon plaisir (directed by Francis Girod) - La secrétaire du président
- 1984: L'Amour à mort (directed by Alain Resnais) - (voice)
- 1984: L'Amour en douce (directed by Edouard Molinaro) - Claire
- 1986: State of Grace (directed by Jacques Rouffio) - Madeleine Lombard
- 1987: Le Journal d'un fou (directed by Roger Coggio) - Mavra
- 1988: Les Baisers de secours (directed by Philippe Garrel) - la mère de Mathieu
- 1995: Passage à l'acte (directed by Francis Girod) - (final film role)
