= List of French films of 1961 =

A list of films produced in France in 1961.

Title	Director	Cast	Genre	Notes
All the Gold in the World	René Clair	Bourvil, Alfred Adam, Philippe Noiret	Comedy	French-Italian co-production
Amelie or The Time to Love	Michel Drach	Marie-José Nat, Clotilde Joano, Jean Sorel	Drama	
The American Beauty	Robert Dhéry	Robert Dhéry, Colette Brosset, Christian Marin, Louis de Funès, Michel Serrault	Comedy	
Captain Fracasse	Pierre Gaspard-Huit	Jean Marais, Geneviève Grad, Gérard Barray	Adventure	French-Italian co-production
Cocagne	Maurice Cloche	Fernandel, Dora Doll, Leda Gloria	Comedy	Co-production with Italy
The Colossus of Rhodes	Sergio Leone	Rory Calhoun, Lea Massari, Georges Marchal	Adventure	Italian-Spanish-French co-production
The Counterfeiters of Paris	Gilles Grangier	Jean Gabin, Martine Carol, Bernard Blier	Comedy	French-Italian co-production
The Count of Monte Cristo	Claude Autant-Lara	Louis Jourdan, Yvonne Furneaux, Pierre Mondy	Adventure	
Daniella by Night	Max Pécas	Elke Sommer, Ivan Desny, Helmut Schmid	Spy	Co-production with West Germany
Dynamite Jack	Jean Bastia	Fernandel, Eleonora Vargas, Lucien Raimbourg	Western comedy	Co-production with Italy
Enclosure	Armand Gatti	Jean Négroni	Drama	French-Yugoslavian co-production
Erik the Conqueror	Mario Bava	Cameron Mitchell, Andrea Checchi, Françoise Christophe	Adventure	Italian-French co-production
Five Day Lover	Philippe de Broca	Jean Seberg, Jean-Pierre Cassel, Micheline Presle	Comedy, romance	French-Italian co-production
The Game of Truth	Robert Hossein	Marc Cassot, Jacques Dacqmine, Nadia Gray, Robert Hossein, Tiny Yong, Daliah Lavi, Perrette Pradier, Françoise Prévost, Georges Rivière, Jean Servais, Jean-Louis Trintignant, Jeanne Valérie, Paul Meurisse	Crime	
Girl with a Suitcase	Valerio Zurlini	Claudia Cardinale, Jacques Perrin, Corrado Pani	Drama, romance	Italian-French co-production
Goodbye Again	Anatole Litvak	Ingrid Bergman, Yves Montand, Anthony Perkins	Drama, romance	American-French co-production
Hercules and the Conquest of Atlantis	Vittorio Cottafavi	Reg Park, Alessandro Sperli, Fay Spain	Adventure, fantasy	Italian-French co-production
Dans l'eau qui fait des bulles	Maurice Delbez	Louis de Funès, Pierre Dudan, Marthe Mercadier, María Riquelme, Philippe Lemaire, Jacques Castelot	Comedy	
The Joy of Living	René Clément	Barbara Lass, Alain Delon, Gino Cervi	Comedy	French-Italian co-production
Keep Talking, Baby	Guy Lefranc	Eddie Constantine, François Chauveau	Crime	
La Notte	Michelangelo Antonioni	Marcello Mastroianni, Jeanne Moreau, Monica Vitti	Drama	Italian-French co-production
The Last of Mrs. Cheyney	Franz Josef Wild	Lilli Palmer, Carlos Thompson	Comedy	Co-production with West Germany
Last Year at Marienbad	Alain Resnais	Delphine Seyrig, Giorgio Albertazzi, Sacha Pitoeff	Drama	French-Italian co-production
Léon Morin, Priest	Jean-Pierre Melville	Jean-Paul Belmondo, Emmanuelle Riva, Irène Tunc	Drama	French-Italian co-production
Lola	Jacques Demy	Anouk Aimée, Marc Michel, Elina Labourdette	Drama, romance	French-Italian co-production
The Long Absence	Henri Colpi	Alida Valli, Georges Wilson, Jacques Harden	Drama	French-Italian co-production
Long Live Henry IV... Long Live Love!	Claude Autant-Lara	Francis Blanche, Bernard Blier, Pierre Brasseur, Francis Claude, Nicole Courcel, Danielle Darrieux, Danielle Gaubert, Roger Hanin, Melina Mercouri, Armand Mestral, Simone Renant, Vittorio De Sica, Jean Sorel	Adventure, comedy, historical	French-Italian co-production
Madame Sans-Gêne	Christian-Jaque	Sophia Loren, Robert Hossein, Julien Bertheau	Comedy	French-Italian-Spanish co-production
The Menace	Gérard Oury	Robert Hossein, Marie-José Nat	Drama	French-Italian co-production
Le Miracle des loups	André Hunebelle	Jean Marais, Rosanna Schiaffino, Roger Hanin	Historical	French-Italian co-production
Murder Party	Helmut Ashley	Magali Noël, Harry Meyen, Götz George	Mystery thriller	Co-production with West Germany
No Time for Ecstasy	Jean-Jacques Vierne	Peter van Eyck, Daliah Lavi, Roland Lesaffre	Drama, War	
The Nina B. Affair	Robert Siodmak	Nadja Tiller, Pierre Brasseur, Walter Giller	Drama	French-West German co-production
One Night on the Beach	Michel Boisrond	Martine Carol, Jean Desailly, Geneviève Grad, Daliah Lavi	Drama, Romance	French-Italian co-production
The Passion of Slow Fire	Édouard Molinaro	Jean Desailly	Crime	
Please, Not Now!	Roger Vadim	Brigitte Bardot, Jacques Riberolles, Claude Brasseur	Comedy	French-Italian co-production
The President	Henri Verneuil	Jean Gabin, Bernard Blier	Drama, Thriller	French-Italian co-production
Rendezvous	Jean Delannoy	Annie Girardot, Andréa Parisy, Odile Versois, Jean-Claude Pascal, Philippe Noiret, Michel Piccoli, Jean-François Poron	Crime	French-Italian co-production
The Return of Dr. Mabuse	Harald Reinl	Rudolf Fernau, Werner Peters, Lou Seitz	Crime	West German-French-Italian co-production
The Sahara Is Burning	Michel Gast	Paul Guers, Jean Servais, Magali Noël	Adventure	
The Season for Love	Pierre Kast	Françoise Arnoul, Daniel Gélin, Françoise Prevost	Comedy drama	
Second Bureau Against	Jean Stelli	Frank Villard, Dominique Wilms	Thriller	
Spotlight on a Murderer	Georges Franju	Pierre Brasseur, Pascale Audret, Marianne Koch	Mystery	
The Taste of Violence	Robert Hossein	Robert Hossein, Giovanna Ralli, Mario Adorf	Western	French-West German-Italian co-production
Taxi for Tobruk	Denys de La Patellière	Hardy Krüger, Lino Ventura, Maurice Biraud, Charles Aznavour	War	
The Thief of Bagdad	Arthur Lubin	Steve Reeves, Giorgia Moll, Edy Vessel	Adventure, fantasy	Italian-French co-production
The Three Musketeers	Bernard Borderie	Gérard Barray, Bernard Woringer, Gérard Barray	Adventure	French-Italian co-production
Tintin and the Golden Fleece	Jean-Jacques Vierne	Georges Wilson, Charles Vanel, Darío Moreno	Adventure	
Wise Guys	Claude Chabrol	Jean-Claude Brialy, Bernadette Lafont, Charles Belmont	Comedy-drama	French-Italian co-production
A Woman Is a Woman	Jean-Luc Godard	Anna Karina, Jean-Paul Belmondo, Jean-Claude Brialy	Comedy	French-Italian co-production
The Wonders of Aladdin	Henry Levin	Donald O'Connor, Noëlle Adam, Vittorio De Sica	Children's, comedy, fantasy	Italian-French-American co-production

== See also ==
- 1961 in France
- 1961 in French television
