= Mr. Orchid =

1946 film

- Directed by: René Clément
- Written by: Noël-Noël
- Produced by: Armand Bécüe
- Starring: Noël-Noël; Paul Frankeur; Nadine Alari
- Cinematography: Claude Renoir
- Edited by: Henriette Wurtzer
- Music by: René Cloërec
- Production company: BCM
- Distributed by: Les Films Corona
- Release date: 30 April 1946
- Running time: 95 minutes
- Country: France
- Language: French

Mr. Orchid (French: Le Père tranquille) is a 1946 French drama film directed by René Clément and starring Noël-Noël, Paul Frankeur and Nadine Alari. It was entered into the 1946 Cannes Film Festival. It was shot at the Cité Elgé studios in Paris. The film's sets were designed by the art director Lucien Carré.

== Synopsis ==
In a little town in the south-west of France during the German occupation, Édouard Martin handles the insurance needs of his fellow citizens and also, unknown to his family, is the local head of the Resistance. An officer in the First World War, he runs his network on disciplined lines, following orders from headquarters in London, who supply radios and arms by air.

When a stranger named Jourdan is parachuted in and wants to mount dangerous attacks, he deduces that the man is an imposter and has him shot. Called in for questioning and asked if he knows Jourdan, he says the man is a Gaullist bastard. “Oh”, says the German officer, “He' s one of our agents, but seems to have gone missing.”

When it becomes apparent that the Germans are using a factory near his house to build mini-submarines, he asks for the Royal Air Force to destroy it. Since a raid might damage his own house and those of his neighbours, he asks them all to a dinner party in a restaurant. The pretext is the engagement of one of Édouard's deputies, Pelletier, who is in love with his daughter Monique. Lancaster bombers flatten the factory and the Germans, deducing that Édouard must have known in advance, arrest him. Damaged but alive, he is rescued by his network and, when the Germans retreat in 1944, reunited with his proud family.

== Cast ==
- Noël-Noël as Édouard Martin
- Paul Frankeur as Simon
- Nadine Alari as Monique Martin
- José Artur as Pierre Martin
- Claire Olivier as Madame Martin
- Jeanne Herviale as Marie
- Marcel Delaître as Charrat
- Jean Lara as Pelletier
- Maurice Chevit as Un maquisard
- Alice Leitner as Madame Renaud
- Georges Questau as le proviseur
- Simone Lestan as la résistante à vélo
- Maurice Salabert as Le boucher
- Jaqueline Lefer as la femme de ménage, résistante
- Pierre Noël as le garçon de café
- Howard Vernon as Le lieutenant Fleischer, l'officier allemand

== Bibliography ==
- Crisp, Colin. French Cinema—A Critical Filmography: Volume 2, 1940–1958. Indiana University Press, 2015.
- Williams, Alan. Republic of Images: A History of French Filmmaking. Harvard University Press, 1992.
