= Noël-Noël =

French actor and screenwriter (1897–1989)

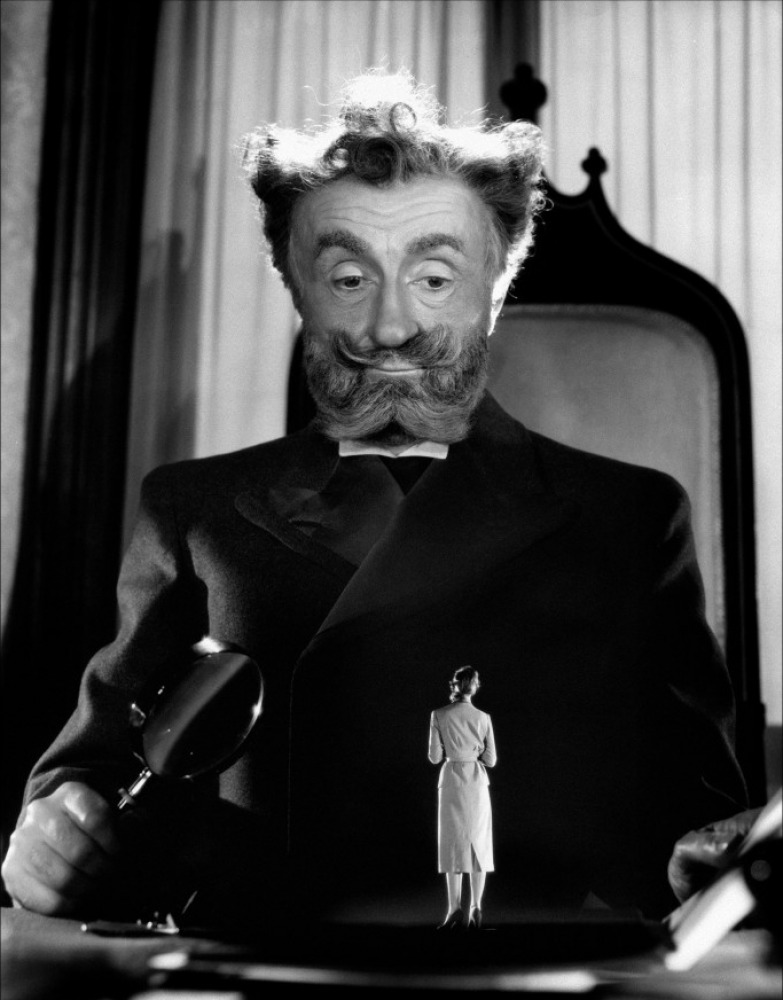
- Born: Lucien Noël; 9 August 1897; Paris, France
- Died: 5 October 1989 (aged 92); Nice, France
- Occupations: Actor, screenwriter
- Years active: 1931–1966

Noël-Noël (born Lucien Noël; 9 August 1897 – 5 October 1989) was a French actor and screenwriter.

== Partial filmography ==
- La prison en folie (1931) − Yves Larsac
- When Do You Commit Suicide? (1931) − Léon Mirol
- Mistigri (1931) − Zamore
- La brigade du bruit (1931)
- A Father Without Knowing It (1932) − Léon Jacquet
- Monsieur Albert (1932) − Monsieur Albert
- Mon coeur balance (1932) − Le comte Noel
- A Star Disappears (1932) − Himself
- To Live Happily (1932) − Jean Mauclair
- Les jeux sont faits (1932)
- My Hat (1933) − Grégoire
- Mannequins (1933) − Alfred
- Vive la compagnie (1934) − Jean−Jacques Bonneval
- Une fois dans la vie (1934) − Léon Saval
- Skylark (1934) − Adémaï
- Mam'zelle Spahi (1934) − Bréchu − l'ordonnance du colonel
- Adémaï in the Middle Ages (1935) − Adémaï
- Moutonnet (1936) − Moutonnet et Mérac
- Tout va très bien madame la marquise (1936) − Yonnik Le Ploumanech
- The Innocent (1938) − Nicolas
- The Duraton Family (1939) − Adrien Martin
- Sur le plancher des vaches (1940) − Jean Durand
- The Woman I Loved Most (1942) − Le chirurgien
- Adémaï bandit d'honneur (1943) − Adémaï
- A Cage of Nightingales (1945) − Clément Mathieu
- Mr. Orchid (1946) − Édouard Martin
- The Spice of Life (1948) − Lecturer
- Return to Life (1949) − René (segment 4 : "Le retour de René")
- La Vie chantée (1951, Director) − L'auteur
- The Seven Deadly Sins (1952) − Le directeur (Saint−Pierre) (segment "Paresse, La / Sloth")
- La Fugue de Monsieur Perle (1952) − Bernard Perle
- Le fil à la patte (1954) − Le comte Fernand du Bois d'Enghien − un viveur sur le point de se marier
- The French, They Are a Funny Race (1955) − Monsieur Taupin
- The Terror with Women (1956) − Aimé Morin
- Bonjour Toubib (1957) − Le docteur Forget
- On Foot, on Horse, and on Wheels (1957) − Léon Martin
- Les Truands (1957) − Cahuzac
- Seventh Heaven (1958) − Guillaume Lestrange
- A Dog, a Mouse, and a Sputnik (1958) − Léon Martin
- Messieurs les ronds de cuir (1959) − Monsieur de la Hourmerie
- The Old Guard (1960) − Blaise Poulossière
- Jessica (1962) − Old Crupi
- Girl on the Road (1962) − Le baron
- La sentinelle endormie (1966) − Le docteur Mathieu
