= On Foot, on Horse, and on Wheels =

- Directed by: Maurice Delbez
- Written by: Jacques Antoine; Serge de Boissac; Jean-Jacques Vital
- Starring: Noël-Noël; Denise Grey
- Cinematography: André Germain
- Edited by: Gilbert Natot
- Music by: Paul Misraki
- Color process: Black and white
- Production companies: Les Films Jean Jacques Vital; Regina Films; Simoja; Cino del Duca
- Distributed by: Cinédis
- Release date: 11 September 1957
- Running time: 87 minutes
- Countries: France; Italy
- Language: French
- Box office: 3,483,954 admissions (France)

On Foot, On Horse and On Wheels is the US title for the 1957 French comedy film, À pied, à cheval et en voiture.

It marked the film debut of Jean Paul Belmondo.

The movie was a massive hit at the French box office with admissions of 3,483,954. It led to a follow-up A Dog, a Mouse, and a Sputnik.

== Plot ==
Mr. Léon Martin, the incarnation of the average bourgeois, decides to buy a car. He hopes to appear better during a hunting trip with Monsieur de Grandlieu. Through this social encounter, the future of his daughter Mireille, in love with Paul de Grandlieu, must become clearer. From this hope will come the obtaining of a driving license, the visit to the Auto Show, the hesitations over the choice of model, the deceptions of a hair-raising salesman, and the comical adventures of the hunt in Sologne. Having returned from everything, Mr. Martin finally marries his daughter according to his heart and maintains his preference for the metro as a means of transport.

== Cast ==
- Noël-Noël : Léon Martin
- Denise Grey : Marguerite Martin
- Sophie Daumier : Mireille Martin
- Darry Cowl : Hubert
- Jean Tissier : Le vendeur au Salon de l'Automobile
- Gil Vidal : Paul de Grandlieu
- Aimé Clariond : Monsieur de Grandlieu
- Viviane Gosset : Alice Lambert
- Noël Roquevert : Mr Guillard
- Suzanne Guémard : Hélène Guillard
- Hubert Deschamps : Robichet
- Jacques Fabbri : Auguste
- Gérard Darrieu : Robert
- Robert Vattier : L'inspecteur auto-école
- Pierre Mirat : Viviani
- Edmond Ardisson : Duchemin
- Joël Monteilhet : Le fils Duchemin
- Jean Galland : Mr Cordier
- Pierre Leproux : Mr Chartis
- Maurice Chevit : Léon
- Henri Coutet : Un garde chasse de Mr de Grandlieu
- Jean-Pierre Jaubert : Chotard
- Jean-Pierre Cassel : Mariel
- Jean-Paul Belmondo : Venin
- Jean-Pierre Moutier : Un copain de Mireille
- Bernard Musson : Un agent lors de l'accident
