= Graduation Year =

1964 film

- Directed by: Maurice Delbez; José-André Lacour
- Written by: Maurice Delbez; José-André Lacour
- Produced by: Andrée Gautier
- Starring: Jean Desailly; Simone Valère; Paul Amiot
- Cinematography: Andréas Winding
- Edited by: Denise Natot
- Music by: Claude Carrère
- Production companies: Bertho Films; Carlton Film Export; Compagnie Industrielle et Commerciale Cinématographique
- Distributed by: S.N. Prodis
- Release date: 12 February 1964
- Running time: 94 minutes
- Country: France
- Language: French

Graduation Year (French: L'année du bac) is a 1964 French drama film directed by Maurice Delbez and José-André Lacour and starring Jean Desailly, Simone Valère and Paul Amiot.

== Cast ==
- Jean Desailly as M. Terrenoire
- Simone Valère as Mme Terrenoire
- Paul Amiot as Le général
- Jacques Rispal as Le prof Cachou
- Yvette Etiévant as Mme Cathou
- Bernard Murat as Mic
- Jean-Claude Mathieu as Jacques
- Francis Nani as Petit Cachou
- Michel Tureau as Giacomo
- Catherine Lafond as Nicky
- Elisabeth Wiener as Evelyne
- Joëlle Bernard as La fille du "Rendez-vous des chasseurs"
- Robert Vidalin as Maclou

== Bibliography ==
- Martin, Yves. Le cinéma français, 1946-1966: un jeune homme au fil des vagues. Editions Méréal, 1998.
