= Dany Saval =

French actress (born 1942)

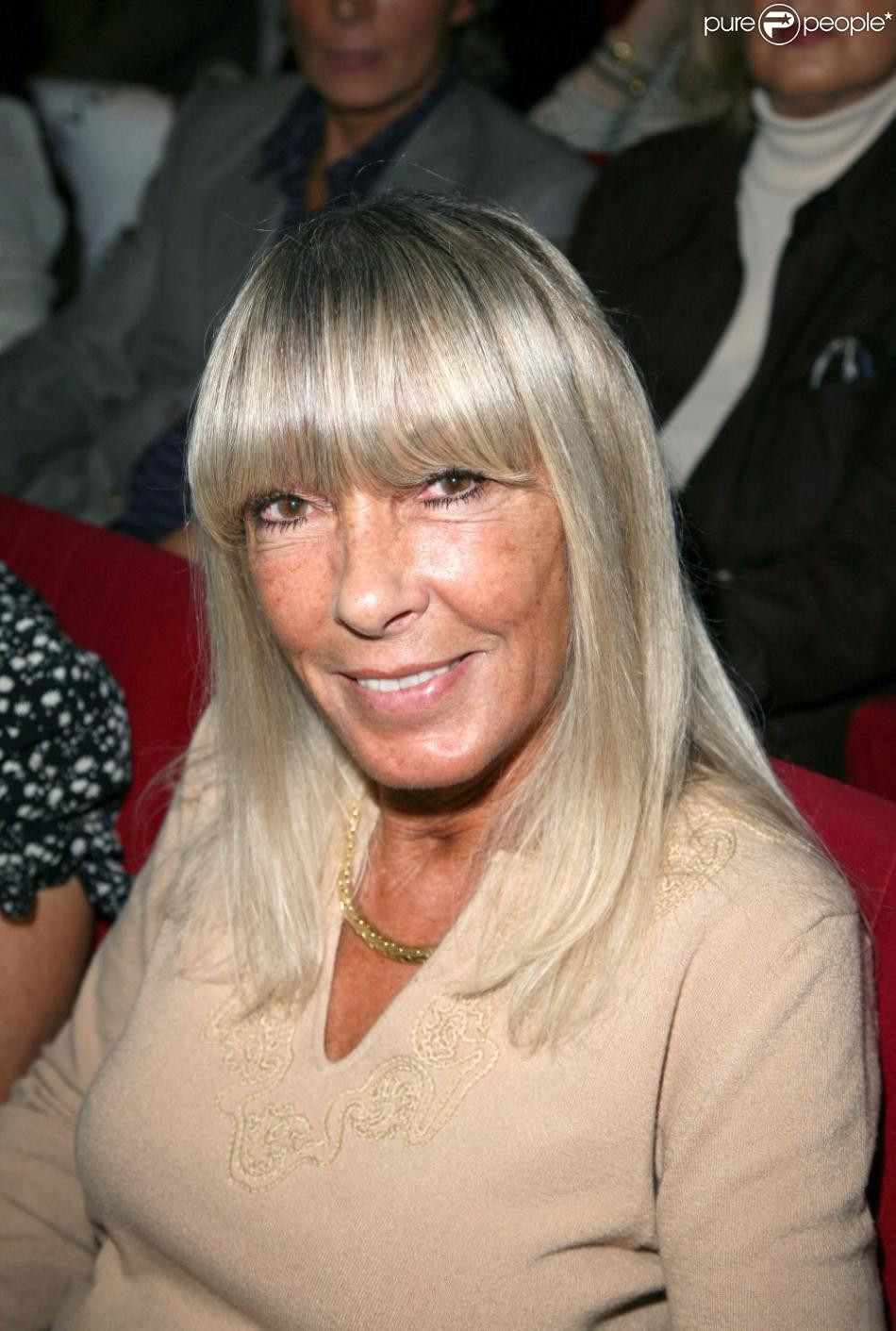
- Saval, 2015
- Born: Danielle Nadine Suzanne Savalle; 5 January 1942 (age 84); Paris, France
- Occupation: Actress
- Years active: 1958–1987
- Spouse: Michel Drucker

Dany Saval (born Danielle Nadine Suzanne Savalle; 5 January 1942) is a retired French actress.

Her career flourished during the 1950s and 1960s. Best known in America as one of a trio of airline stewardesses being shuffled around by Tony Curtis and Jerry Lewis in the slapstick comedy Boeing Boeing, in which she played alongside Thelma Ritter, Christiane Schmidtmer, and Suzanna Leigh.

Dany Saval retired from the film and entertainment business in the late 1980s. She has a daughter named Stephanie Jarre (daughter of Maurice Jarre, her first husband), and currently resides in Paris with her fourth husband, Michel Drucker. In 1985 and 1987, she also scripted a celebrity comic about her real-life dog Zaza, herself and Michel Drucker. The artwork was provided by Jean-Pierre Gibrat.

== Selected filmography ==
Year	Title	Role	Director
1958	Girl and the River	uncredited	François Villiers
1959	Nathalie, Secret Agent	Pivione	Henri Decoin
1962	Moon Pilot	Lyrae	James Neilson
1964	Une souris chez les hommes	Lucile	Jacques Poitrenaud
1964	Jealous as a Tiger	Jeanine	Maurice Delbez
1964	Constance aux enfers	Pascale	François Villiers
1965	Boeing Boeing	Jacqueline Grieux aka "Air France"	John Rich
1972	It Can Be Done Amigo	Mary Bronston	Maurizio Lucidi
1974	Graf Yoster gibt sich die Ehre (TV show, 1 episode)	Nathalie Gilain	Georg Tressler
1977	Animal	Doris	Claude Zidi
1977	Parisian Life	Pauline	Christian-Jacque
1980	Inspector Blunder	the antiquarian	Claude Zidi
