= Paul Frankeur =

French actor (1905–1974)

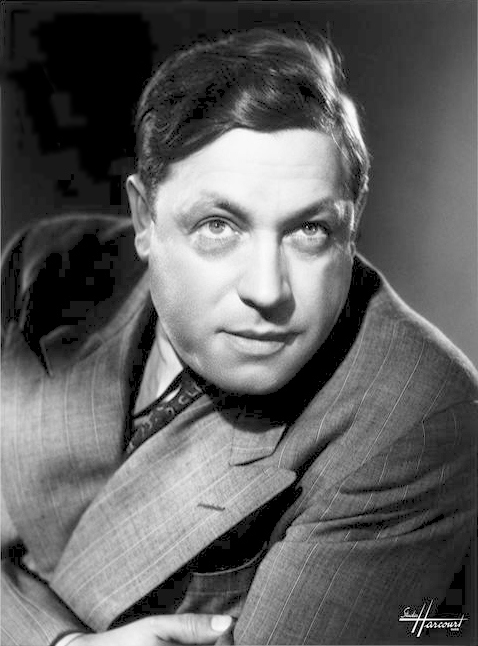
- Frankeur in 1947
- Born: 29 June 1905; Paris, France
- Died: 27 October 1974 (aged 69); Nevers, France

Paul Frankeur (29 June 1905 – 27 October 1974) was a French actor who had a successful Hollywood career and appeared in films by Jacques Tati, such as Jour de fête and Luis Buñuel, including The Discreet Charm of the Bourgeoisie and The Phantom of Liberty). He was sometimes credited as Paul Francoeur.

== Selected filmography ==
- Portrait of Innocence (1941) - Le secrétaire du commissaire (uncredited)
- Sideral Cruises (1942) - Le premier bonimenteur
- Fantastic Night (1942) - Le patron du bistrot
- Le mariage de Chiffon (1942) - Le mécanicien de Max
- Une étoile au soleil (1943)
- Le voyageur de la Toussaint (1943) - (uncredited)
- Madame et le mort (1943)
- Goodbye Leonard (1943) - Edouuard - le cordonnier (uncredited)
- Night Shift (1944) - Un réparateur de ligne
- Children of Paradise (1945) - L'inspecteur de police
- A Cage of Nightingales (1945) - (uncredited)
- Girl with Grey Eyes (1945)
- Star Without Light (1946) - Le reporter
- Devil's Daughter (1946) - L'aubergiste / The bartender
- Messieurs Ludovic (1946) - M. Seguin (uncredited)
- The Ideal Couple (1946) - Le coiffeur
- Mr. Orchid (1946) - Simon
- Counter Investigation (1947) - Teddy Coffre-Fort
- The Lovers of Pont Saint Jean (1947) - Georges Girard
- The Bouquinquant Brothers (1947)- Le commissaire
- The Spice of Life (1948) - Le blagueur
- Daybreak (1949) - Bac
- Jour de fête (1949) - Marcel
- Return to Life (1949) - Le maire (segment 5 : Le retour de Louis")
- Histoires extraordinaires à faire peur ou à faire rire... (1949) - Dugelay
- Monseigneur (1949) - Le forain
- The Little Zouave (1950) - L'inspecteur-chef
- Justice Is Done (1950) - Monsieur Jouvillon (uncredited)
- The Winner's Circle (1950) - Victor
- Under the Sky of Paris (1951) - Milou
- Passion (1951) - Jacques Charbonnier
- The Smugglers' Banquet (1952) - Auguste Demeuse
- We Are All Murderers (1952) - Léon
- Follow That Man (1953) - M. Mallet
- Endless Horizons (1953) - Soupape
- Jeunes mariés (1953) - Le brigadier de gendarmerie
- Thérèse Raquin (1953) - Le contrôleur
- L'Étrange Désir de monsieur Bard (1954) - Le curé
- Before the Deluge (1954) - Monsieur Boussard
- Touchez pas au grisbi (1954) - Pierrot
- Huis clos (1954) - Gomez - le compagnon de Garcin
- Le petit nuage/La chasse au nuage/Le nuage atomique (1954) - Regisseur
- The Price of Love (1955) - Commissaire Bernard
- Razzia sur la chnouf (1955) - Fernand, le commissaire
- The Hotshot (1955) - Georges
- Black Dossier (1955) - Charles Broussard
- Nana (1955) - Bordenave
- Je suis un sentimental (1955) - Jacques Rupert
- People of No Importance (1956) - Émile Barchandeau
- Les Assassins du dimanche (1956) - Lucien Simonet
- Blood to the Head (1956) - Drouin
- The Schemer (1957) - Marc Kelber
- Le rouge est mis (1957) - Fredo
- An Eye for an Eye (1957) - L'opéré
- Les Copains du dimanche (1958) - Monsieur Larcheron - le directeur de l'usine
- Le désordre et la nuit (1958) - Inspecteur Chaville
- A Bullet in the Gun Barrel (1958) - Pépère
- The Tiger Attacks (1959) - Raymond Maroux
- Marie-Octobre (1959) - Lucien Marinval - mandataire aux Halles
- Archimède le clochard (1959) - M. Grégoire, le premier patron du café
- Minute papillon (1959) - Moraga
- Maigret and the Saint-Fiacre Case (1959) - Le docteur Bouchardon
- Rue des prairies (1959) - Ernest l'ami d'Henri
- Come Dance with Me! (1959) - Inspector Marchal
- Quai du Point-du-Jour (1960) - Monsieur Pierre
- Le panier à crabes (1960) - Clavier
- The Lovemakers (1961) - Ferdinando
- Jugez-les bien (1961) - Cassel
- Un singe en hiver (1962) - Esnault
- The Gentleman from Epsom (1962) - Arthur
- The Trip to Biarritz (1963) - Le chauffeur de la locomotive (uncredited)
- Maigret Sees Red (1963) - Bonfils
- Le commissaire mène l'enquête (1963) - Inspecteur Reboux
- Nick Carter va tout casser (1964) - Antonio
- La corde au cou (1965) - L'inspecteur Bruneau
- God's Thunder (1965) - Le gendarme (uncredited)
- La Longue marche (1966) - Morel
- The Mona Lisa Has Been Stolen (1966) - Lemercier, l'encadreur
- Le deuxième souffle (1966) - Inspector Fardiano
- Leontine (1968) - Ruffin
- The Milky Way (1969) - Pierre
- My Uncle Benjamin (1969) - Le docteur Minxit
- The Discreet Charm of the Bourgeoisie (1972) - François Thévenot
- Poil de carotte (1973) - Le parrin / Godfather
- The Phantom of Liberty (1974) - L'aubergiste / Innkeeper
- Le cri du coeur (1974) - Jean
- Dédé la tendresse (1974)
- Un tueur, un flic, ainsi soit-il... (1977) - Dutour (final film role)
