= Maurice Chevit =

French actor (1923–2012)

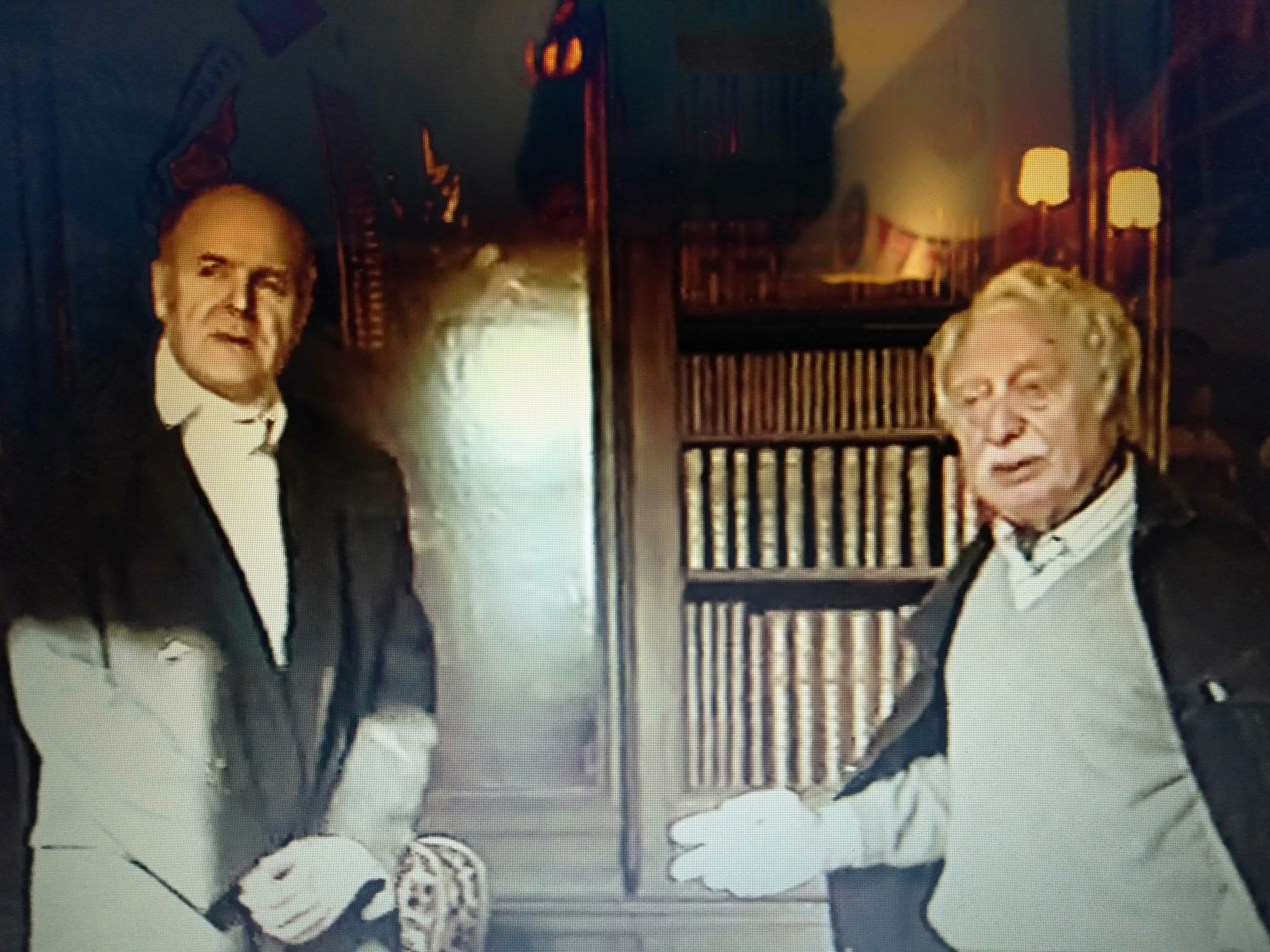

Maurice Chevit (31 October 1923 – 2 July 2012) was a French actor.

Maurice Chevit made his theatrical début just after the Second World War, and made his first screen appearance in 1946 in René Clément's film Le Père tranquille. In August 1950, the Theatre de la Huchette in Paris presented Pepita ou Cinq cents francs de bonheur, a three-act comedy that Chevit co-wrote with Henri Fontenille; Chevit himself appeared in it, playing alongside Jacqueline Maillan, Pierre Mondy and Jacques Jouanneau. He was seen in many small film roles during the 1950s and 1960s, working with producers such as Henri Decoin and André Cayatte, but he was best known as a stage actor.

== Television ==
Maigret (2002) - (French tv series), Sn 8 Ep 1 "To Any Lengths" "Signe Picpus", M. Lecloagen

== Selected filmography ==
- Mr. Orchid (1946) - Un maquisard (film debut)
- Contre-enquête (1947)
- L'Arche de Noé (1947) - Le dessinateur
- Between Eleven and Midnight (1949) - L'employé aux empreintes (uncredited)
- Histoires extraordinaires à faire peur ou à faire rire... (1949)
- La belle que voilà (1950) - Le photographe (uncredited)
- Without Leaving an Address (1951) - Le soldat qui dort dans la salle d'attente (uncredited)
- Under the Paris Sky (1951) - Le peintre (uncredited)
- Clara de Montargis (1951) - Edouard - le majordome
- Yours Truly, Blake (1954) - Un complice
- Blackmail (1955) - Un complice
- Les Hussards (1955) - Camille - un soldat
- Deuxième bureau contre inconnu (1957)
- On Foot, on Horse, and on Wheels (1957) - Léon
- Why Women Sin (1958) - Un consommateur (uncredited)
- The Mask of the Gorilla (1958) - Le second inspecteur del'hygiène
- Rapt au Deuxième Bureau (1958) - Dédé
- Croquemitoufle (1959)
- Famous Love Affairs (1961) - Un employé du Wurtemberg (uncredited)
- How to Succeed in Love (1962) - L'agent
- Two Are Guilty (1963) - Un inspecteur
- Les baisers (1964) - Le père
- Relax Darling (1964) - Hubert
- The Gorillas (1964) - Le premier contractuel
- The Sleeping Car Murders (1965) - Un inspecteur
- Le chien fou (1966) - Le mécano
- The Curse of Belphegor (1967) - Garnier
- Asterix the Gaul (1967) - (voice)
- Astérix et Cléopâtre (1968) - (voice)
- L'auvergnat et l'autobus (1969) - Un syndicaliste (uncredited)
- Saturnin et le Vaca-Vaca (1969) - (voice)
- L'âne de Zigliara (1970) - Le maire de Sainte-Marie
- La belle affaire (1973)
- Le viol (1973)
- Dis bonjour à la dame!.. (1977) - Totor, le poivrot
- Molière (1978) - The priest of the school
- Le sucre (1978) - Lomont
- Le Coup de Sirocco (1979) - General Bauvergne
- French Fried Vacation 2 (1979) - Marius
- Signé Furax (1981) - Monsieur Léon, obéliscologue
- La femme ivoire (1984) - M. Cheneau
- Leave All Fair (1985, New Zealand film, shot in France) - Alain
- My Brother-in-Law Killed My Sister (1986) - Monsieur Bongrand
- Douce France (1986) - Jules
- Lévy et Goliath (1987) - Oncle Mardoché
- Julien Fontanes, magistrat (1986-1987, TV Series) - Banyuls / Max
- De guerre lasse (1987) - Elie Blumfield, le grand-père juif
- La comédie du travail (1988) - Le vieux chômeur
- Je t'ai dans la peau (1990) - L'abbé Roussel
- The Hairdresser's Husband (1990) - Ambroise Dupré dit Isidore Agopian
- Un ascenseur pour l'an neuf (1990)
- 588 rue paradis (1992) - Nazareth
- L'honneur de la tribu (1993) - Le narrateur
- XY, drôle de conception (1996) - M. Fleury, le père d'Eric
- Ridicule (1996) - le Notaire
- Une femme très très très amoureuse (1997) - Forstock
- C'est la tangente que je préfère (1997) - Jean-Pierre
- Women (1997) - Alberto
- XXL (1997) - David Stern
- Le regard d'un ami (1998)
- Babel (1999) - Kazam's Voice (French version, voice)
- Voyages (1999) - Mendelbaum
- Joséphine, ange gardien (1999, TV Series) - Cyprien
- À vot' service (1999) - Le vieux monsieur / Old Man (segment "Monsieur Noël")
- The Widow of Saint-Pierre (2000) - The Governor's Father
- The Man on the Train (2002) - Le coiffeur
- Laisse tes mains sur mes hanches (2003) - Robert
- Le Cou de la girafe (2004) - Maurice
- Love Is in the Air (2005) - Le prêtre (uncredited)
- Le Pressentiment (2006) - An old man
