= Simone Sylvestre =

French actress (1923–2020)

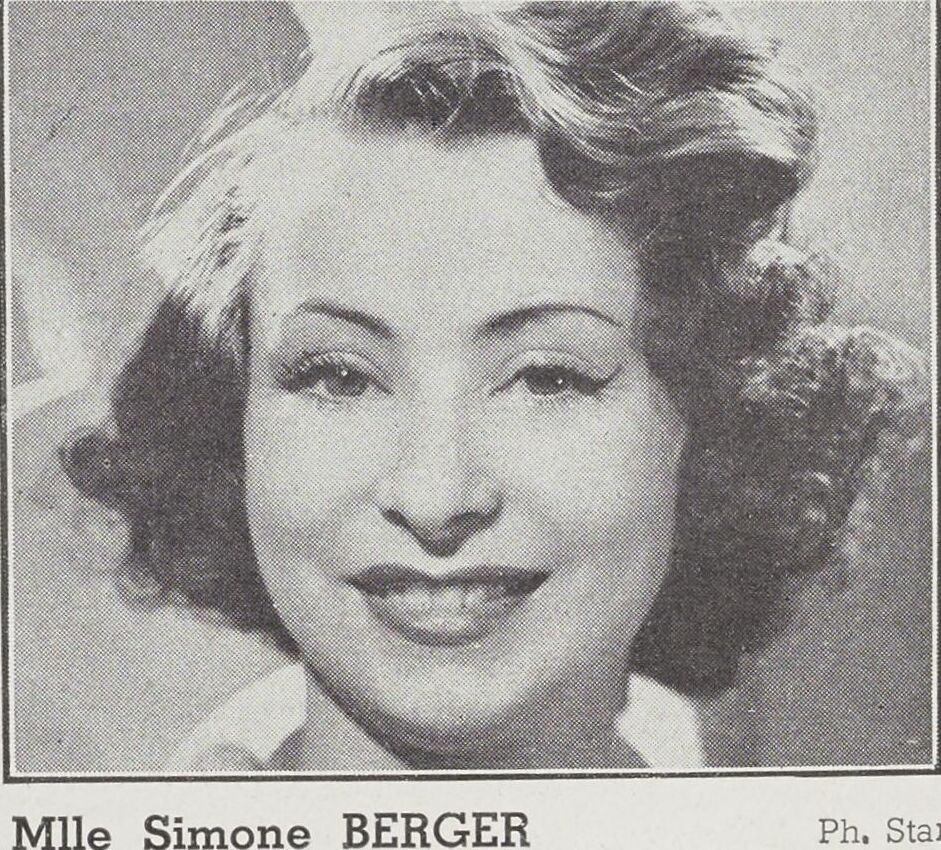
- Born: 16 September 1923; Paris, France
- Died: 29 March 2020 (aged 96); La Bruffière, France
- Occupation: Actress

Simone Marie Jeanne Berger (16 September 1923 – 29 March 2020), better known as Simone Sylvestre, was a French film actress. Sylvestre died on 29 March 2020, at the age of 96.

== Filmography ==
- 1941: Ne bougez plus by Pierre Caron
- 1941: Premier rendez-vous by Henri Decoin: a resident of the orphanage
- 1942: The Strangers in the House by Henri Decoin: a journalist
- 1944: Les Petites du quai aux fleurs by Marc Allégret: Édith
- 1944: Twilight by Marc Allégret: Mme de Ligny
- 1946: The Visitor by Jean Dréville: Simone
- 1946: Pétrus by Marc Allégret: Francine
- 1947: La Femme en rouge by Louis Cuny: Irmène
- 1949: Between Eleven and Midnight by Henri Decoin : Léone
- 1955: Frou-Frou by Augusto Genina: Ketty
- 1955: M'sieur la Caille by André Pergament: a girl
- 1955: Razzia sur la chnouf by Henri Decoin: the man's partner with the gun
- 1956: Elena and Her Men by Jean Renoir: a friend of Henri
- 1957: L'Aventurière des Champs-Élysées by Roger Blanc: Monique
