= Claire Olivier =

French actress

- Born: 13 March 1892; Vallon-sur-Gée, Sarthe, France
- Died: 28 March 1954 (aged 62); Limeil-Brevannes, Val-de-Marne, France
- Occupation: Actress
- Years active: 1918–1971 (film & TV)

Claire Olivier (1892-1974) was a French stage film and television actress. A character actress, she generally appeared in supporting roles in French cinema.

== Selected filmography ==
- A Picnic on the Grass (1937)
- The Train for Venice (1938)
- The Strangers in the House (1942)
- Angels of Sin (1943)
- Mr. Orchid (1946)
- Bichon (1948)
- The Spice of Life (1948)
- La Vie en Rose (1948)
- The Passenger (1949)
- Lady Paname (1950)
- Without Leaving an Address (1951)
- Darling Caroline (1951)
- Alone in Paris (1951)
- The Billionaire Tramp (1951)
- Dr. Knock (1951)
- Passion (1951)
- Monsieur Taxi (1952)
- Piédalu Works Miracles (1952)
- Le Plaisir (1952)
- Full House (1952)
- The Little Rebels (1955)
- Men in White (1955)
- Suspicion (1956)
- A Very Curious Girl (1969)

== Bibliography ==
- Crisp, Colin. French Cinema—A Critical Filmography: Volume 2, 1940–1958. Indiana University Press, 2015.
- Turk, Edward Baron. Child of Paradise: Marcel Carné and the Golden Age of French Cinema. Harvard University Press, 1989.
