= The Four Musketeers (1963 film) =

- Directed by: Carlo Ludovico Bragaglia
- Screenplay by: Bruno Corbucci; Giovanni Grimaldi
- Story by: Bruno Corbucci; Giovanni Grimaldi
- Produced by: Gianna Buffard
- Starring: Aldo Fabrizi; Nino Taranto; Erminio Macario; Carlo Croccolo
- Cinematography: Tino Santoni
- Edited by: Giulianna Attenni
- Music by: Gianni Ferrio
- Production companies: Titanus; Societe Generale de Cinematographie
- Release date: 1963
- Running time: 105 minutes
- Countries: Italy; France

The Four Musketeers (Italian: I quattro moschettieri, French: Le quatrième mousquetaire) is a 1963 Italian-French adventure-comedy film co-written and directed by Carlo Ludovico Bragaglia and starring Aldo Fabrizi, Erminio Macario and Nino Taranto. It is a loose parody of Alexandre Dumas' The Three Musketeers.

== Cast ==
- Aldo Fabrizi as Bouboule
- Erminio Macario as Dubois
- Nino Taranto as Frisson
- Carlo Croccolo as Lapin
- Peppino De Filippo as Cardinal Richelieu
- Carla Marlier as Costanza Bonacieux
- Béatrice Altariba as Queen Anne of Austria
- Lisa Gastoni as Milady de Winter
- Alberto Bonucci as Cyrano de Bergerac
- Francesco Mulè as Louis XIII
- Georges Rivière as D'Artagnan
- Nando Poggi as Athos
- Betto Di Paolo as Aramis
- Andrea Aureli as Porthos
- Franco Ressel as Lord Buckingham
- Nino Terzo as Rochefort
- John Francis Lane as Bonacieux
- Anna Campori as Marianna
- Milena Vukotic as Milady's Maid

== Release ==
The Four Musketeers was released in 1963.

== Notes ==
=== References ===
- Kinnard, Roy; Crnkovich, Tony (2017). Italian Sword and Sandal Films, 1908-1990. McFarland. ISBN 978-1476662916.
