= Jean-Michel Rouzière =

French actor

- Born: April 27, 1931; Marseille, France
- Died: February 13, 1989 (aged 57); Saint-Denis, France
- Occupations: Actor, Theatre director
- Awards: Knight of the Légion d'honneur

Jean-Michel Rouzière (died 13 February 1989) was a French comic actor and theatre head.

== Life ==
He headed the Théâtre du Palais-Royal in Paris from 1965. He then headed the Théâtre des Variétés, also in Paris, from 1975. He was made a knight of the Légion d'Honneur.

== Filmography ==
- 1942: Vie privée (by Walter Kapps)
- 1952: Jocelyn
- 1954: Les Intrigantes (by Henri Decoin) - Jean, le garçon du restaurant (uncredited)
- 1954: Madame du Barry (by Christian-Jaque) - (uncredited)
- 1954: Le Rouge et le Noir (by Claude Autant-Lara)
- 1954: Bonnes à tuer
- 1957: L'honorable Mr. Pepys
- 1958: Cette nuit-là - (uncredited)
- 1959: Pourquoi viens-tu si tard?
- 1959: Le Bossu (by André Hunebelle)
- 1960: Le Capitan (by André Hunebelle) - Un gentilhomme de la province
- 1961: Les Amours de Paris
- 1961: Les Godelureaux - (uncredited)
- 1961: Le Miracle des loups - Un soldat (uncredited)
- 1962: Portrait-robot
- 1963: Le Vice et la Vertu - SS Man
- 1963: Blague dans le coin
- 1964: Le Bluffeur
- 1964: Requiem pour un caïd
- 1965: Le Vampire de Düsseldorf
- 1965: Paris vu par... - Jean-Marc (segment "Place de l'Etoile")
- 1966: Paris brûle-t-il? - Le monsieur au petit chien
- 1968: Mayerling - Police superintendent
- 1971: Le Cinéma de papa - Le représentant de la Colombia (final film role)

== Theatre ==
Actor

- 1959 : Le Cas Dobedatt by George Bernard Shaw, producer Jean Mercure, Théâtre des Bouffes-Parisiens
- 1959 : Le Client du matin by Brendan Behan, producer Georges Wilson, Théâtre de l'Œuvre
- 1962 : Au petit bonheur by Marc-Gilbert Sauvajon, producer Jean-Michel Rouzière, Théâtre des Nouveautés

Producer

- 1962 : Au petit bonheur by Marc-Gilbert Sauvajon, Théâtre des Nouveautés
- 1965 : Gigi by Colette, Théâtre du Palais-Royal
- 1982 : Lorsque l’enfant paraît by André Roussin, Théâtre des Variétés
