= Jean Desailly =

French actor (1920–2008)

Jean Desaily
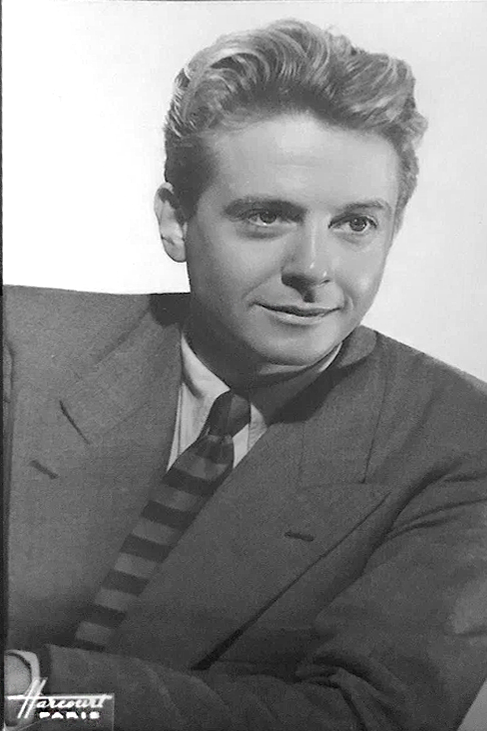
- Image of Desailly
- Born: 24 August 1920; Paris, France
- Died: 11 June 2008 (aged 87); Dourdan, France
- Occupation: Actor
- Years active: 1943–1999

Jean Desailly (24 August 1920 – 11 June 2008) was a French actor. He was a member of the Comédie-Française from 1942 to 1946, and later participated in about 90 movies.

== Life and career ==
Desailly studied at the École nationale supérieure des beaux-arts and the Conservatoire de Paris winning first prize, joining the Comédie-Française in 1942. In 1946 he became a leading member of the Jean-Louis Barrault-Madeleine Renaud company at the Théâtre Marigny, playing in a wide repertoire from Les Fausses Confidences, Bérénice and Le Songe d'une nuit d'été.

With the Renaud-Barrault at the Odéon-Théâtre de France he played both leading roles in le Mariage de Figaro: Figaro on tour in the provinces and Count Almaviva in Paris.

Desailly's second wife was the French actress Simone Valère, with whom he formed a theatre company which they directed successively at the Théâtre Hébertot and the Théâtre de la Madeleine. A wide repertoire was played at the two theatres from 1972 to 2002.

In music he was the narrator on the 1965 recording of Stravinsky's Oedipus rex conducted by Karel Ančerl for Supraphon and on the 1971 recording of Honegger's Le roi David under Charles Dutoit for Erato (with Valère as the prophetess).

== Partial filmography ==
- 1943: Strange Inheritance - Gilles Mauvoisin
- 1945: Father Goriot - Bianchon
- 1945: The Last Judgment - Kyril
- 1946: Sylvie and the Ghost - Frédéric
- 1946: Pastoral Symphony - Jacques Martens - son fils
- 1946: Patrie (directed by Louis Daquin) - Karloo
- 1946: The Revenge of Roger - Raymond de Noirville
- 1947: Loves, Delights and Organs - Jean Pelletier dit 'Pivoine'
- 1947: Four Knaves - Jacques de la Bastide
- 1948: Une grande fille toute simple - Michel
- 1949: L'échafaud peut attendre - Michel Vincent
- 1949: Daybreak - Larzac
- 1949: The Widow and the Innocent - Claude Girelle
- 1949: Keep an Eye on Amelia (Occupe-toi d'Amélie) - Marcel Courbois
- 1950: Chéri - Fred Peloux, dit 'Chéri'
- 1950: Véronique - Florestan
- 1951: Tomorrow We Get Divorced - Max Blachet
- 1952: Jocelyn - Jocelyn
- 1954: Royal Affairs in Versailles - Marivaux
- 1955: Les Grandes manoeuvres (directed by René Clair) - Victor Duverger
- 1955: On ne badine pas avec l'amour - Perdican
- 1958: Maigret tend un piège - Marcel Maurin
- 1958: Les Grandes Familles (directed by Denys de La Patellière) - François Schoudler
- 1959: A Midsummer Night's Dream (Sen noci svatojánské) (animation directed by Jiří Trnka) - Narrator (French version) (voice)
- 1959: 125 Rue Montmartre - Commissaire Dodelot
- 1959: Le secret du Chevalier d'Éon - Louis XV
- 1960: Préméditation - Le juge Lenoir
- 1960: The Baron of the Locks - Maurice Montbernon
- 1960: Le Saint mène la danse - Fred Pellmann
- 1960: Love and the Frenchwoman - Voice of the speaker (segment "Adolescence, L'")
- 1961: Un soir sur la plage - Dr. Francis
- 1961: La Mort de Belle (directed by Édouard Molinaro) - Stéphane Blanchon
- 1961: Legge di guerra - Rade
- 1961: Famous Love Affairs - Le baron de Jonchère (segment "Comédiennes, Les")
- 1962: The Seven Deadly Sins - Monsieur Duparc - le père de Bernard (segment "Luxure, La")
- 1962: Le Doulos (directed by Jean-Pierre Melville) - Le commissaire Clain
- 1964: Graduation Year - M. Terrenoire
- 1964: The Soft Skin (La Peau douce) (directed by François Truffaut) (nominated for the Golden Palm at the Cannes Film Festival in 1964; received the Bodil Award for Best European Film in 1965) - Pierre Lachenay
- 1965: The Two Orphans - Le comte de Linières
- 1966: De Dans van de Reiger - Edouard
- 1967: The 25th Hour - Cabinet Minister
- 1967: Le Franciscain de Bourges - Monsieur Toledano
- 1967: La Vie parisienne (directed by Yves-André Hubert) (television version of 1958 stage production by Jean-Louis Barrault) - Raoul de Gardefeu
- 1970: L'ardoise - Le commissaire Clair
- 1971: Comptes à rebours - Michel St Rose
- 1972: The Assassination of Trotsky - Alfred Rosmer
- 1972: Un flic - L'homme distingué
- 1972-1973: Les Rois maudits (TV Mini-Series) - Récitant / Narrator
- 1973: The Inheritor - Jean-Pierre Carnavan
- 1973: Night Flight from Moscow - Narrator (voice, uncredited)
- 1974: The Irony of Chance - M. Desvrières
- 1979: Le cavaleur - Charles-Edmond
- 1979: Jeu de la barbichette - Le directeur de la Police Judiciaire
- 1979: Le mouton noir - De Brugères
- 1980: Pile ou face - Bourgon-Massenet
- 1981: Le Professionnel (won the Golden Screen Award, 1983) - Le ministre
- 1984: Le fou du roi - Louis XIV
- 1990: Équipe de nuit - Le père
- 1990: Le Radeau de la Méduse - Tullaye
- 1999: La dilettante - Edmond Thibault
- 2000: En face - (voice) (final film role)

== Awards and nominations ==
- 1960: Nominated for the BAFTA Award for Best Actor in a Leading Role in 1960, for his role in Maigret tend un piège.
- 2002: Awarded the Molière acting prize.
