= 1961 in French television =

This is a list of French television related events from 1961.

== Events ==
- 18 February – Jean-Paul Mauric is selected to represent France at the 1961 Eurovision Song Contest with his song "Printemps, avril carillonne". He is selected to be the sixth French Eurovision entry during a national final.
- 18 March – The 6th Eurovision Song Contest is held at the Palais des Festivals et des Congrès in Cannes. Luxembourg wins the contest with the song "Nous les amoureux" performed by Jean-Claude Pascal.

== Debuts ==
- Chambre noire
- 13 December – Les Coulisses de l'exploit (1961–1972)

== Television shows ==
=== 1940s ===
- Le Jour du Seigneur (1949–present)

=== 1950s ===
- Art et magie de la cuisine
- Cinq colonnes à la une
- Discorama
- Magazine féminin (1952–1970)
- Lectures pour tous (1953–1968)
- La Piste aux étoiles (1956–1978)
- Voyage sans passeport (1957–1969)

=== 1960s ===
- La Tête et les Jambes (1960–1978)

== Ending this year ==
- Le Club du jeudi (1950–1961)

== Networks and services ==
=== Launches ===
Network	Type	Launch date	Notes	Source

=== Conversions and rebrandings ===
Old network name	New network name	Type	Conversion Date	Notes	Source

=== Closures ===
Network	Type	Closure date	Notes	Source

== Births ==
- 2 April – Marie-Ange Nardi, television presenter

== See also ==
- 1961 in France
- List of French films of 1961
