= Mata Hari, Agent H21 =

- Directed by: Jean-Louis Richard
- Written by: Jean-Louis Richard; François Truffaut
- Produced by: Eugène Lépicier
- Starring: Jeanne Moreau; Jean-Louis Trintignant; Claude Rich
- Cinematography: Michel Kelber
- Edited by: Kenout Peltier
- Music by: Georges Delerue
- Release date: 29 January 1965 (France)
- Running time: 98 minutes
- Countries: France; Italy
- Languages: French; Italian
- Box office: 1,364,543 admissions (France)

Mata Hari, Agent H21 (Italian: Mata-Hari, agente segreto H21) is a 1964 French-Italian spy film directed by Jean-Louis Richard and starring Jeanne Moreau, Jean-Louis Trintignant and Claude Rich. It portrays the activities of the First World War spy Mata Hari. Costumes by Pierre Cardin.

== Synopsis ==
In Paris during the First World War, an exotic dancer called Mata Hari moves in the best circles and has affairs with influential men. In fact she is Grietje Zelle from the neutral Netherlands and spies for Germany. At a party she lures Captain François Lasalle, a French army officer, back to her apartment. Once he is asleep, her contact photographs key documents from his briefcase.

In their night together, François and Greitje have fallen in love. He wants to marry her, but she cannot break her contract with the Germans. When he goes back to the front, her contact gives her a new mission. She has to get into the office of another officer, Colonel Pelletier, and steal the plans of the ammunition depot he commands. After achieving this, with the help of her chauffeur Julien who is also in the pay of the Germans, she escapes into neutral Spain.

When German agents succeed in blowing up the depot, Greitje is offered a ticket to anywhere in the world. She nonplusses her handlers by saying she wants to go back to France, so they arrange for her payoff to be at a bank in Paris. In fact she wants to rejoin François, who she finds at the front. While they are making love in an abandoned building, it is infiltrated by a German patrol. François is killed, but she escapes. Making her way to Paris, she is arrested as she leaves the bank and, after a court martial, shot. Nobody claims her body.

== Cast ==
- Jeanne Moreau as Mata Hari / Margaretha Geertruida Zelle
- Jean-Louis Trintignant as Captain François Lasalle
- Claude Rich as Julien the Chauffeur
- Henri Garcin as Gaston, Mata-Hari's Lover
- Georges Riquier as Ludovic
- Frank Villard as Colonel Emile Pelletier / Legrand
- Albert Rémy as Adam Zelle, Mata Hari's Father
- Hella Petri as Baronne du Maine
- Nicole Desailly as Charlotte, Mata-Hari's Maid
- Carla Marlier as Ernestine, Mata-Hari's Maid
- Jean-Marie Drot as German Spy Chief
- Marcel Berbert as Detective Following Mata-Hari
- Georges Géret as Soldier #2
- Henri Coutet as Soldier
- Charles Denner as Soldier #1
- Max Desrau as Spectateur at the Alcazar
- Van Doude as Policeman at the Bank's Entrance
- Marie Dubois as Marie, the Young Girl
- Yvette Etiévant as Nurse at the War Front
- Édouard Francomme
- Marcel Gassouk as Policeman
- Charles Lavialle
- Jean-Pierre Léaud as Absalon
- Claude Mansard as Alcazar's Manager
- Serge Rousseau
- Pierre Tornade

== See also ==
- Mata Hari (1927)
- Mata Hari (1931)
- Mata Hari (1985)

== Bibliography ==
- Craig, John S. Peculiar Liaisons: In War, Espionage, and Terrorism in the Twentieth Century. Algora Publishing, 2005.
