= Carla Marlier =

French actress

- Born: 5 February 1938; Berlin, Germany
- Occupation: Actress
- Years active: 1960-1977 (film)

Carla Marlier (born 1938) is a French former model and film actress, known for playing female leads and prominent supporting roles in films of the 1960s. These included The Avenger (1962) The Four Musketeers (1963). In August 1960 she appeared as the cover model for Vogue Paris.

== Selected filmography ==
- Zazie dans le Métro (1960)
- The Girl with the Golden Eyes (1961)
- The Avenger (1962)
- Sentimental Education (1962)
- Good Luck, Charlie (1962)
- Any Number Can Win (1963)
- The Four Musketeers (1963)
- Déclic et des claques (1965)
- Ces dames s'en mêlent (1965)
- Mata Hari, Agent H21 (1965)
- Spirits of the Dead (1968)
- Je t'aime, je t'aime (1968)
- The Boat on the Grass (1971)
- La bourgeoise et le loubard (1977)

== Bibliography ==
- Goble, Alan. The Complete Index to Literary Sources in Film. Walter de Gruyter, 1999.
