= Jocelyn (1952 film) =

- Directed by: Jacques de Casembroot
- Written by: Alphonse de Lamartine (novel); Dany Gérard
- Produced by: Pierre Braunberger
- Starring: Jean Desailly; Simone Valère; Jean Vilar
- Cinematography: Roger Dormoy
- Edited by: Andrée Danis
- Music by: Jean-Jacques Grünenwald
- Production company: Panthéon Productions
- Distributed by: Panthéon Distribution
- Release date: 8 March 1952
- Running time: 92 minutes
- Country: France
- Language: French

Jocelyn is a 1952 French historical drama film directed by Jacques de Casembroot and starring Jean Desailly, Simone Valère and Jean Vilar. It is set during the French Revolution. It is based on the 1836 novel of the same title by Alphonse de Lamartine, which had previously been made into a 1933 film.

The film's sets were designed by the art director Raymond Nègre.

== Cast ==
- Jean Desailly as Jocelyn
- Simone Valère as Laurence
- Jean Vilar as Le supérieur du nouveau séminaire
- Nicole Berger as Julie, la soeur de Jocelyn
- Jean Debucourt as Le parrain de Julie
- Yvette Etiévant as Soeur Louise
- Alexandre Rignault as Le berger
- André Carnège as Le supérieur de l'ancien séminaire
- Germaine de France
- Étienne Aubray
- Gérard Buhr
- Marguerite Cavadasky
- Guy Favières
- Christian Melsen
- Albert Michel
- Roger Rafal
- Guy Rapp
- Jean-Michel Rouzière
- Georges Sellier

== Bibliography ==
- Hayward, Susan. French Costume Drama of the 1950s: Fashioning Politics in Film. Intellect Books, 2010.
