= The Visitor (1946 film) =

1946 film

- Directed by: Jean Dréville
- Written by: Jean Bernard-Luc
- Produced by: Maurice Saurel
- Starring: Pierre Fresnay; Antoine Balpêtré; Jean Debucourt
- Cinematography: André Thomas
- Edited by: Monique Bonnot
- Music by: René Cloërec
- Production company: Majestic Films
- Distributed by: La Société des Films Sirius
- Release date: 4 December 1946
- Running time: 90 minutes
- Country: France
- Language: French

The Visitor (French: Le visiteur) is a 1946 French drama film directed by Jean Dréville and starring Pierre Fresnay, Antoine Balpêtré and Jean Debucourt. The film's sets were designed by the art director René Renoux.

== Cast ==
- Pierre Fresnay as Sauval
- Antoine Balpêtré as Louberger
- Jean Debucourt as L'inspecteur
- Michel Vitold as Oxner
- Edmond Beauchamp as Ledru
- Simone Sylvestre as Simone, la secrétaire
- Max Dejean as Grand policier
- Robert Le Fort as Petit policier
- Pierre Genu as Brigadier
- Charles Lavialle as Facteur
- Michel Barbey as Milou, le valet
- Jean-Pierre Méry as Gendarme #1
- Baudruche as Gendarme #2
- Lea Maria Maya as Léa Ledru
- Berretta as La vieille
- Roger Krebs as Clarens
- Roger Dubois as La Savate
- Pascal Tabary as Bouton
- Jean Besombes as Tilloy

== Bibliography ==
- Bessy, Maurice & Chirat, Raymond. Histoire du cinéma français: encyclopédie des films, 1940–1950. Pygmalion, 1986
- Rège, Philippe. Encyclopedia of French Film Directors, Volume 1. Scarecrow Press, 2009.
