= And Your Sister? =

1958 film

- Directed by: Maurice Delbez
- Written by: Pierre Apestéguy; Maurice Delbez; Roland Laudenbach; Roger Ribadeau-Dumas
- Produced by: Roland Laudenbach; Alain Poiré; Roger Ribadeau-Dumas
- Starring: Pierre Fresnay; Arletty; Jean-Claude Brialy
- Cinematography: Robert Lefebvre
- Edited by: Louisette Hautecoeur
- Music by: Henri Crolla; André Hodeir
- Production companies: Société Française de Cinématographie; Les Films Saint-James; Gaumont
- Distributed by: Gaumont Distribution
- Release date: 24 September 1958
- Running time: 83 minutes
- Country: France
- Language: French

And Your Sister? (French: Et ta soeur?) is a 1958 French comedy film directed by Maurice Delbez, starring Pierre Fresnay, Arletty and Jean-Claude Brialy.

== Cast ==
- Pierre Fresnay as Bastien du Boccage
- Arletty as Lucrèce du Boccage
- Jean-Claude Brialy as Bruno Puymartin
- Sophie Grimaldi as Francine du Boccage
- Jacques Dufilho as Puymartin, l'auteur
- Jean Tissier as Le directeur de la prison
- Annie Fratellini as Jeannette
- Pierre Destailles as Le directeur du journal
- Jean-Pierre Cassel as L'ami du fiancé
- René Bergeron as Le contrôleur du train
- Christian Brocard as Un machiniste T.V
- René Hell as Julien le concierge
- Jean-Jacques Steen as Le brigadier

== Bibliography ==
- Parish, James Robert. Film Actors Guide: Western Europe. Scarecrow Press, 1977.
