= Moon Pilot =

1962 film by James Neilson

- Theatrical release poster
- Directed by: James Neilson
- Written by: Maurice Tombragel
- Based on: Starfire by Robert Buckner
- Produced by: Walt Disney
- Starring: Tom Tryon; Brian Keith; Edmond O'Brien; Dany Saval; Bob Sweeney; Kent Smith; Tommy Kirk
- Cinematography: William Snyder
- Edited by: Cotton Warburton
- Music by: Hoyt S. Curtin
- Production company: Walt Disney Productions
- Distributed by: Buena Vista Distribution
- Release date: April 5, 1962
- Running time: 99 minutes
- Country: United States
- Language: English
- Box office: $3.5 million (US/Canada)

Moon Pilot is a 1962 American Technicolor science fiction comedy film from Walt Disney Productions, released through Buena Vista Distribution, directed by James Neilson, and starring Tom Tryon, Brian Keith, Edmond O'Brien, Dany Saval, and Tommy Kirk. The film is based on Robert Buckner's 1960 novel Starfire, and reflects Disney's interest in America's space program during the Presidency of John F. Kennedy in the early 1960s.

== Plot ==
Air Force Capt. Richmond Talbot inadvertently volunteers to make the first crewed flight around the Moon. He is ordered to keep the upcoming flight a secret, even from his family on his upcoming leave.

On his flight to visit his family, Talbot is approached by Lyrae, a mysterious "foreign" girl who seems to know all about the astronaut's coming mission. She approaches Talbot to warn him about possible defects in his spacecraft. He assumes she is a spy, runs away from her, and contacts the Air Force. The Air Force orders him home and places him under the protection of "National Security", a thinly disguised FBI.

Eventually, Lyrae reveals that she is a friendly alien from the planet Beta Lyrae. She wants to offer him a special paint formula that when applied to his rocket, will safeguard his brain from "proton rays". Enchanted by the young woman, Talbot sneaks away from the agents who have been guarding him to spend more time with Lyrae. Eventually, after his rocket is launched, Lyrae appears by his side and convinces him to visit her planet with her. Talbot informs Mission Control that he will be a little late coming back. The film ends with Mission Control totally confounded by the bizarre transmissions they are receiving from both singing a romantic song duet about her home planet Beta Lyrae.

== Cast ==
- Tom Tryon as Captain Richmond Talbot
- Dany Saval as Lyrae
- Brian Keith as Major General Vanneman
- Edmond O'Brien as McClosky
- Tommy Kirk as Walter Talbot
- Bob Sweeney as Sen. Henry McGuire
- Kent Smith as Secretary of the Air Force
- Simon Scott as Medical Officer
- Bert Remsen as Agent Brown
- Sarah Selby as Mrs. Celia Talbot
- Dick Whittinghill as Col. Briggs

Sally Field makes her film debut as one of the beatnik girls in the lineup. She is the one in the oversized sweater, dark hair, and glasses. Jo Anne Worley also appears as an extra. Nancy Kulp appears as a space flight nutritionist.

== Production ==
Robert Buckner's novel Starfire had been serialized in The Saturday Evening Post and came to the attention of Disney. They bought the screen rights in 1961.

The screenplay took a satirical view of the United States government, with someone chiding a politician with "Didn't you read our 'Simple Science for Senators?'" The same character types Disney deified in their earlier Man in Space series were now gently made fun of in the film. The Federal Bureau of Investigation protested to Walt Disney about their portrayal in the film. First, they objected to an FBI Agent guarding an astronaut, as that was not a Bureau function. Disney changed the character into a Federal Security Officer. Once the film was released, the FBI complained the federal agent was portrayed in "a most slapstick and uncomplimentary manner".

For his leading man, Disney chose Tom Tryon, who had been starring in Texas John Slaughter on television, but for the space female Disney chose Dany Saval, then touted as the "new Brigitte Bardot" for her American debut. He surrounded his two young stars with many experienced actors and a chimp for children. Disney's songwriters, Robert B. Sherman and Richard M. Sherman, contributed several songs to the film with Saval recording The Seven Moons of Beta Lyrae, which was released on a record with Annette's The Crazy Place in Outer Space.

== Release ==
The film debuted at New York's famous Radio City Music Hall as their Easter holiday attraction. Also on the program was Disneyland, U.S.A., a live stage show co-produced by the Disney team that featured elements and characters from the famed theme park in Anaheim, California. Moon Pilot was later released through VHS on July 26, 1986.

== Reception ==
Bosley Crowther of The New York Times wrote that the film was "not as witty as it might be ... But Charlie is a natural and amusing (isn't every chimpanzee?) and the rocket stuff is fascinating. This should be a fun film for the kids." A review in Variety said that at first glance the film "is a marvelous mixture of absolute nonsense, a thoroughly intoxicating, high-spirited and full bodied blend of moonshine and monkeyshine", underneath which "lurks a most disarmingly irreverent spoof of the current morbid preoccupation with reaching various heavenly bodies before anyone else beats us to it." Harrison's Reports graded the film as "Fair", explaining: "At times the film plays itself out with so much slapstickish absurdity, that it robs the story of whatever entertainment values it strives to achieve." The Monthly Film Bulletin stated: "Too often the film sacrifices its high-spirited kick for the reassurances of pleasant family fare. A healthy, iconoclastic film for the most part, though, and one that goes as far as one can reasonably expect its producers to go."

== See also ==
- List of American films of 1962
