= Good Luck, Charlie (film) =

1962 film

- Directed by: Jean-Louis Richard
- Written by: Jacques Houbard; Jean Aurel; Jean-Louis Richard
- Produced by: Eddie Constantine
- Starring: Eddie Constantine; Albert Préjean; Carla Marlier
- Cinematography: Michel Kelber
- Music by: Edgar Bischoff
- Production company: Belmont Films
- Distributed by: Unidex
- Release date: 11 July 1962
- Running time: 90 minutes
- Country: France
- Language: French

Good Luck, Charlie (French: Bonne chance, Charlie) is a 1962 French thriller film directed by Jean-Louis Richard and starring Eddie Constantine, Albert Préjean and Carla Marlier. Location shooting took place around Athens. Constantine was known at the time for his role as the FBI agent Lemmy Caution in a series of films based on the novels of Peter Cheyney. It was the final film of Préjean, who had been a prominent leading man in the 1940s.

== Synopsis ==
Charlie, a wealthy American, has long sought revenge on the Nazi medical doctor who had conducted experiments on the inmates in the prisoner of war camp he was in. He has received a tip-off that the doctor is now living in Greece as a collector of Old Master paintings.

== Cast ==
- Eddie Constantine as Charlie
- Albert Préjean as Cardin
- Carla Marlier as Florence
- Robert Moor as Berthier
- Claude Vernier as Muller
- Yvon Lec as Henrioud

== Bibliography ==
- Gillain, Anne. Truffaut on Cinema. Indiana University Press, 2017.
- Oscherwitz, Dayna & Higgins, MaryEllen. The A to Z of French Cinema. Scarecrow Press, 2009.
- Rège, Philippe. Encyclopedia of French Film Directors, Volume 1. Scarecrow Press, 2009.
