= Alone in Paris =

1951 film

- Directed by: Hervé Bromberger
- Written by: Jacques Berland; Hervé Bromberger; Alex Joffé
- Produced by: Jean Martinetti; Marcel Pagnol
- Starring: Bourvil; Magali Noël; Yvette Etiévant
- Cinematography: Jacques Mercanton
- Edited by: André Gaudier
- Music by: Raymond Legrand
- Production companies: Les Films Marcel Pagnol; Eminente Films
- Distributed by: Gaumont Distribution
- Release date: 28 November 1951
- Running time: 95 minutes
- Country: France
- Language: French

Alone in Paris (French: Seul dans Paris) is a 1951 French comedy drama film directed by Hervé Bromberger and starring Bourvil, Magali Noël, Georgette Anys and Yvette Etiévant. It was shot at the Francoeur Studios in Paris and on location around the city. The film's sets were designed by the art director Eugène Delfau.

== Synopsis ==
A couple from Normandy arrive in Paris to spend their honeymoon in the capital. However, separated on the Paris Metro they both experience a series of adventures in the city on the eve of the Bastille Day celebrations. Eventually the couple are reunited, much the wiser for their time in Paris.

== Cast ==
- Bourvil as Henri Milliard
- Magali Noël as Jeanne 'Jeannette' Milliard née Duvernet
- Yvette Etiévant as Germaine
- Camille Guérini as Ernest Milliard
- Georges Baconnet as François Bouqueret
- Claire Olivier as Amélie Bouqueret
- Germaine Reuver as Mathilde
- Albert Rémy as Arthur
- Georgette Anys as La dame du métro
- Léonce Corne as Le patron du 'Bon Accueil'
- Jean Dunot as Auguste Duvernet
- Grégoire Gromoff as Un client de l'hôtel
- François Joux as Le 2ème employé du commissariat
- Denise Kerny as L'institutrice
- Christian Lude as Le Commissaire
- Marcel Meral as Le monsieur du commissariat
- Albert Michel as Le 1er employé du commissariat
- Léon Pauléon as L'homme du métro
- Max Révol as L'employé de la consigne

== Bibliography ==
- Siclier, Jacques. Le cinéma français: De la bataille du rail à la Chinoise, 1945-1968. Editions Ramsay, 1990.
