= 1961 in France =

- Decades: 1940s; 1950s; 1960s; 1970s; 1980s
- See also: History of France; Timeline of French history; List of years in France

Events from the year 1961 in France.

== Incumbents ==
- President: Charles de Gaulle
- Prime Minister: Michel Debré

== Events ==
- 8 January – French referendum on Algerian self-determination is approved by three-quarters of voters.
- 18 March – A ceasefire takes effect in the Algerian War of Independence.
- 21 April-26 April – Algiers putsch, failed coup d'état attempt organized by four retired French army generals.
- 31 May
  - Rebel generals Maurice Challe and Andre Zelelr are sentenced to 15 years in prison.
  - President John F. Kennedy and Charles De Gaulle meet in Paris.
- 17 June – A Paris-to-Strasbourg train derails near Vitry-le-François; 24 are killed, 109 injured.
- 29 August – A military aircraft clips a cable of the aerial tramway connecting Pointe Helbronner and the Aiguille du Midi in the French Alps. Three cars of the tramway fall, killing five people, but the remaining 63 cable car passengers are rescued and the pilot lands his plane safely.
- 21 September
  - Organisation armée secrète (OAS) slips an anti-de Gaulle message into TV programming.
  - Fashion brand Yves Saint Laurent is launched by Yves Saint Laurent and Pierre Bergé in Paris.
- October – The Renault 4, a small estate car similar in concept to the Citroen 2CV saloon, is launched at the Paris Salon.
- 10 October – Simca launches the Simca 1000, a small rear-engined four-door family saloon.
- 17 October – Paris massacre, French police attack an unarmed and peaceful demonstration of some 30,000 Algerians. Government acknowledges 40 deaths in 1998, although there are estimates of up to 200.
- 14 November – The Yves Saint Laurent luxury fashion brand is founded in Rue La Boetie, Paris, by Yves Saint Laurent and Pierre Bergé.

== Arts and literature ==
- 4 May – Phenomenological philosopher Maurice Merleau-Ponty dies, age 53, of a stroke, apparently while preparing for a class on Descartes.

== Sport ==
- 18 June – French Grand Prix won by Giancarlo Baghetti of Italy.
- 25 June – Tour de France begins.
- 19 July – Tour de France ends, won by Jacques Anquetil.

== Births ==
- 2 April – François Gernigon, politician
- 15 April – José Anigo, soccer player and sporting director
- 16 May – Solveig Dommartin, actress (died 2007)
- 21 June - Manu Chao, French-Spanish musician
- 2 July – Samy Naceri, French actor
- 21 September – Philippe Anziani, soccer player and coach
- 29 September – Jean-Marie Neff, racewalker
- 9 October – Martial Fesselier, racewalker
- 6 November – Florent Pagny, French singer and actor
- 25 December – Ghislaine Maxwell, British socialite

== Deaths ==
- 3 May – Maurice Merleau-Ponty, phenomenological philosopher (born 1908)
- 29 June – Georges Guillain, neurologist (born 1876)
- 1 July – Louis-Ferdinand Céline, writer (born 1894)

== See also ==
- 1961 in French television
- List of French films of 1961
