= The Suspects (1957 film) =

1957 film

- Directed by: Jean Dréville
- Written by: Antoine-Louis Dominique
- Produced by: Albert Dodrumez; Édouard Harispuru
- Starring: Charles Vanel; Anne Vernon; Jacques Morel
- Cinematography: André Germain
- Edited by: Charles Bretoneiche; Raymond Leboursier
- Music by: René Cloërec
- Production companies: Compagnie Commerciale Française Cinématographique; Union des Distributeurs Indépendants
- Distributed by: Compagnie Commerciale Française Cinématographique
- Release date: 21 August 1957
- Running time: 120 minutes
- Country: France
- Language: French

The Suspects (French: Les Suspects) is a 1957 French crime thriller film directed by Jean Dréville and starring Charles Vanel, Anne Vernon and Jacques Morel. It was shot at the Neuilly Studios in Paris and on location around the city. Footage was also shot off the coast of Monaco. The film's sets were designed by the art director Maurice Colasson.

== Cast ==
- Charles Vanel as Commissaire Perrache
- Anne Vernon as Lucette Vignon
- Jacques Morel as Inspecteur Paul Duchamp
- Maurice Teynac as Kurt Topfer
- Henri Crémieux as Saab Astérich
- Yves Massard as Inspecteur Louis Vignon
- Robert Porte as Koskah
- Marcelle Arnold as Lynda
- Berthe Tissen as Mme. Astérich
- Edmond Ardisson as Linda
- Roger Bontemps as L'officier de marine
- Jean-Paul Coquelin as Un technicien sud-tunisien
- René Havard as Un technicien sud-tunisien
- Germaine de France as Mme Perrache
- André Numès Fils as L'archiviste
- Philippe Olive as Le journaliste
- Grégoire Aslan as Inspecteur Ben Hamman
- René Blancard as Inspecteur Rentier
- Geneviève Morel as La dame au cinéma
- Jean Dréville as Le commentateur

== Bibliography ==
- Rège, Philippe. Encyclopedia of French Film Directors, Volume 1. Scarecrow Press, 2009.
- Glâtre, Patrick. Jean Dréville, cinéaste. Creaphis editions, 2006
