= The Baron of the Locks =

1960 film

- Le Baron de l'écluse
- Directed by: Jean Delannoy
- Written by: Maurice Druon; Michel Audiard based on the novel of Georges Simenon
- Starring: Jean Gabin; Micheline Presle; Jean Desailly; Blanchette Brunoy
- Cinematography: Louis Page
- Edited by: Henri Taverna
- Music by: Jean Prodromidès
- Distributed by: Cinédis
- Release date: 1960
- Running time: 95 min
- Country: France
- Language: French

Le baron de l'écluse, titled in English The Baron of the Locks, is a 1960 French drama film directed by Jean Delannoy. Based on a novel of the same name by Georges Simenon, the screenplay is by Maurice Druon with dialogue by Michel Audiard.

It stars Jean Gabin as a gambler who elopes with a former mistress, played by Micheline Presle, but runs out of money. She departs with a champagne maker (Jean Desailly) and he ponders settling down with an inn owner (Blanchette Brunoy), until one day fresh funds arrive.

== Plot ==
A baron by birth and former fighter ace, Jérôme exists as a gambler, hanging around casinos and racetracks. At Deauville, he strikes lucky by taking not only a million off a Middle Eastern billionaire at baccarat but also lifting his mistress Perle, a brittle old flame. Going further, in a private game he wins eleven million from a marquis who is trying to sell his motor yacht. Jérôme takes the yacht, worth nine million, with a promise that the remaining two million will be sent to a post office he nominates. The vessel is lying at Rotterdam, so Jérôme heads there with Perle and the two then set course by inland waterways for Monte Carlo, his next field of operations.

At a lock in Champagne, the fuel runs out and Jérôme has no ready money left. They have no food either, so eventually Perle walks in desperation all the way to a smart restaurant, where she is picked up by Maurice, heir to a famous winemaking firm. Jérôme accepts that in the circumstances she is entitled to change partners, so she and her cases disappear in Maurice's car. At an isolated little inn near the lock, Jérôme has been telephoning repeatedly to get his two million and has caught the eye of the owner, a sweet widow called Maria. She gives him credit, cooks him meals and her gentle charm makes him think of a peaceful rural life. Until the day his two million comes through to the village post office when, after filling up with fuel, he points his craft south for the Mediterranean and fresh adventures.

== Cast ==
- Jean Gabin : Baron Jérôme Napoléon Anthoine
- Micheline Presle : Perle Germain-Joubert
- Jean Desailly : Maurice Montbernon
- Blanchette Brunoy : Maria Vilandier, the innkeeper
- Jacques Castelot : Marquis de Villamayor
- Jean Constantin : Prince Héliakim Saddokan
