= The Seven Deadly Sins (1952 film) =

- Theatrical poster
- Directed by: Eduardo De Filippo; Jean Dréville; Yves Allégret; Carlo Rim; Roberto Rossellini; Claude Autant-Lara; Georges Lacombe
- Written by: Jean Aurenche; Pierre Bost
- Starring: Michèle Morgan; Françoise Rosay
- Cinematography: André Bac; Roger Hubert; Robert Lefebvre; Jacques Natteau; Giovanni Pucci; Enzo Serafin; André Thomas
- Music by: Yves Baudrier; René Cloërec
- Distributed by: Gaumont Distribution
- Release date: 1952
- Running time: 148 minutes
- Countries: France; Italy
- Language: French
- Box office: 2,396,014 admissions (France)

The Seven Deadly Sins (French: Les Sept Péchés capitaux) is a 1952 French/Italian co-production motion picture drama. The film stars Michèle Morgan, Françoise Rosay, Viviane Romance, Maurice Ronet, Louis de Funès, Isa Miranda, Henri Vidal and Gérard Philipe. It has seven separate sections: ("Pride/L'Orgueil", "Lust/La Luxure", "Sloth/La Paresse", "Envy/L'Envie", "Avarice and Anger/L'Avarice et la colère", "Gluttony/La Gourmandise", "The Eighth Sin/Le Huitième péché") with five episodes from France, and two episodes from Italy.

== Director ==
- Claude Autant-Lara (segment "Pride")
- Yves Allégret (segment "Lust")
- Jean Dréville (segment "Sloth")
- Roberto Rossellini (segment "Envy")
- Eduardo De Filippo (segment "Avarice and Anger")
- Carlo Rim (segment "Gluttony")
- Georges Lacombe (segment "The Eighth Sin")

== Writer ==
- Diego Fabbri
- Liana Ferri
- Léo Joannon
- Turi Vasile
- René Wheeler
- Claude Autant-Lara (segment "Pride")
- Jean Aurenche (segments "Pride", "Lust", "The Eighth Sin")
- Pierre Bost (segments "Pride", "Lust", "The Eighth Sin")
- Daniel Boulanger (segment "Gluttony")
- Carlo Rim (segments "Sloth", "Gluttony")
- Roberto Rossellini (segment "Envy")
- Charles Spaak (segment "Avarice and Anger")
