= The Passion of Slow Fire =

- Directed by: Édouard Molinaro
- Written by: Jean Anouilh (adaptation et dialogue)
- Based on: (D' Après Le Roman); Georges Simenon
- Produced by: François Chavane
- Starring: Jean Desailly
- Narrated by: La mort de Belle by Georges Simenon
- Cinematography: Jean-Louis Picavet
- Edited by: Monique Isnardon; Robert Isnardon
- Music by: Georges Delerue
- Color process: Black and white
- Production company: Cinéphonic
- Distributed by: Lux Compagnie Cinématographique de France
- Release date: 3 March 1961
- Running time: 103 minutes
- Country: France
- Language: French

The Passion of Slow Fire (French: La Mort de Belle) is a 1961 French crime film directed by Édouard Molinaro and starring Jean Desailly and based on the novel La mort de Belle by Georges Simenon.

== Plot ==
Stéphane Blanchon lives a quiet life in Switzerland with his wife, Christine, until a young American boarder named Belle, who was living with them, is found murdered.

== Cast ==
- Jean Desailly as Stéphane Blanchon
- Alexandra Stewart as Belle Shermann
- Yves Robert as Le barman du little Cottage / Bartender
- Yvette Etiévant as Nina Graff - la secrétaire du juge / Judge's Secretary
- Jacques Monod as Le juge d'instruction Beckman / Judge Beckman
- Gabriel Gobin as Le sergent de police Ruchet
- Marc Cassot as Le commissaire Georges Dalcroze / Police Officer
- Louisa Colpeyn as Lorraine Shermann - la mère de Belle / Belle's Mother
- Suzanne Courtal as Madame Pidoux
- George Cusin as Monsieur Genet - le directeur du collège (as Georges Cusin)
- Jacques Hilling as Le gendarme Cristever
- Lucien Hubert as Pidoux
- Christine Lude as Le docteur Clair
- Charles Nissar as Himself
- Georges Pierre as Himself
- Jacques Pierre as Philippe Berthé / Belle's Admirer
- Anne Valon as Himself
- Van Doude as Le professeur Lewis / Psychiatrist
- Monique Mélinand as Christine Blanchon
- Maurice Teynac as L'ivrogne / Stephane's Friend

== Critical reception ==
The New York Times called it "an elegantly comprehensive and persuasive movie version of a Georges Simenon novel" and "concise, introspective drama," and added that "the fascination of the impeccable acting of a first-rate cast, headed by Jean Desailly, is the exquisitely restrained flow and fusion of the incidents, as the protagonist finds his soul stripped bare." The reviewer also praised "director Edouard Molinaro's austere pacing" and wrote that "the adaptation by Jean Anouilh, the playwright, is so visual that it absorbs some brief flashbacks and the protagonist's occasional narration like a sponge." TV Guide described it as "an entertaining crime drama from a novel by the masterful Georges Simenon."

== See also ==
- List of French films of 1961
