= The Spice of Life (film) =

1948 film

- Directed by: Jean Dréville
- Written by: Noël-Noël
- Produced by: Alain Poiré
- Starring: Noël-Noël; Bernard Blier; Jean Tissier
- Cinematography: Léonce-Henri Burel
- Edited by: Jean Feyte
- Music by: René Cloërec
- Production company: Cinéphonic
- Distributed by: Gaumont Distribution
- Release date: 26 October 1948
- Running time: 75 minutes
- Country: France
- Language: French
- Box office: 4,328,290 admissions (France)

The Spice of Life (French: Les Casse Pieds) is a 1948 French comedy film directed by Jean Dréville and starring Noël-Noël, Bernard Blier and Jean Tissier. It was shot at the Saint-Maurice Studios in Paris. The film's sets were designed by the art director Lucien Carré.

== Reception ==
The film was the fifth most popular movie at the French box office in 1949.

== Cast ==
- Noël-Noël as Lecturer
- Bernard Blier as Bernard
- Jean Tissier as Jean
- Henri Crémieux as Henri
- Pierre Destailles as L'employé du gaz
- Marguerite Deval as Marguerite
- René Blancard as Thomas
- Paul Frankeur as Le blagueur
- Georges Questau as Le postillonneur
- Jacques Mattler as L'industriel
- Charles Vissières as Le speaker
- Claire Olivier as La dame qui porte en ville
- Elisa Lamotte as La dame qui conduit mal
- Marion Tourès as L'amoureuse
- Aline André as L'épouse
- La Houppa as La fille
- Madeleine Barbulée as La chanteuse

== Bibliography ==
- Biggs, Melissa E. French films, 1945-1993: a critical filmography of the 400 most important releases. McFarland & Company, 1996.
