= Passion (1951 film) =

1951 film

- Directed by: Georges Lampin
- Written by: Jean-Jacques Gautier; Georges Lampin; Jacques Rémy
- Produced by: Viviane Romance
- Starring: Viviane Romance; Clément Duhour; Paul Frankeur
- Cinematography: Jacques Mercanton
- Edited by: Henri Rust
- Music by: Maurice Thiriet
- Production company: Isarfilm
- Distributed by: La Société des Films Sirius
- Release date: 21 September 1951
- Running time: 88 minutes
- Country: France
- Language: French

Passion is a 1951 French drama film directed by Georges Lampin and starring Viviane Romance, Clément Duhour and Paul Frankeur. The film's sets were designed by the art director Robert Clavel.

== Cast ==
- Viviane Romance as Marie Charbonnier
- Clément Duhour as Gérard Latour
- Paul Frankeur as Jacques Charbonnier
- Jean Brochard as Le directeur de la prison
- Claire Olivier as Georgette Lamy
- André Carnège as Le président de la Cour
- Marcel Raine as Me. Dalmet
- Daniel Crouet as Me. Barbier
- France Descaut as Soeur Dominique
- Jacques Gencel as Le petit Louis
- René Hell as Le bistrot
- Christian Simon as Christian
- André Darnay as l'avocat général
- Odette Barencey as Madame Latour

== Bibliography ==
- Oscherwitz, Dayna & Higgins, MaryEllen. The A to Z of French Cinema. Scarecrow Press, 2009.
