= A Dog, a Mouse, and a Sputnik =

A Dog, a Mouse and a Sputnik
- À pied, à cheval et en spoutnik
- Directed by: Jean Dréville
- Starring: Noël-Noël; Mischa Auer
- Release date: 1958
- Language: French

A Dog, a Mouse and a Sputnik is a 1958 French comedy film. It was also released as Hold That Satellite in some releases.
