= A Cage of Nightingales =

1945 film

La Cage aux rossignols
- Directed by: Jean Dréville
- Written by: Georges Chaperot (story); René Wheeler (story & screenplay); Noël-Noël (adaptation, dialogue & screenplay)
- Starring: Noël-Noël; Micheline Francey; Georges Biscot
- Cinematography: Paul Cotteret; Marcel Weiss
- Edited by: Jacques Grassi
- Music by: René Cloërec
- Distributed by: Gaumont Distribution; Compagnie Parisienne de Location de Films
- Release date: 6 September 1945
- Running time: 89 minutes
- Country: France
- Language: French
- Box office: 5,085,489 admissions (France)

A Cage of Nightingales (French: La Cage aux rossignols) is a 1945 French film directed by Jean Dréville. It was the second most popular movie at the French box office that year and gained a nomination for the Academy Award for Best Story.

Its plot is directly inspired by that of an actual educational centre, called Ker Goat, where Jacques Dietz, Roger Riffier and their teams worked to help children in difficulty through choral singing and innovative teaching methods. The film later served as an inspiration for the film The Chorus (2004), starring the French actor Gérard Jugnot and directed by Christophe Barratier.

== Synopsis ==
Clement Mathieu seeks to publish his novel without success. With the help of a friend who is a journalist, his story about the 'Cage of Nightingales' is slipped surreptitiously into a newspaper...

In France, in the 1930s, a supervisor at a rehabilitation house awakens difficult teens' inner musical tendencies by forming a choir, despite the director's skepticism. Later, this experience is reported in a novel in a major newspaper.

== Cast ==
- Noël-Noël as Clément Mathieu
- Micheline Francey as Micheline
- Georges Biscot as Raymond
- René Génin as Father Maxence
- René Blancard as Monsieur Rachin
- Marguerite Ducouret as Micheline's mother
- Marcelle Praince as the President
- Marthe Mellot as Marie
- Georges Paulais as Monsieur Langlois
- André Nicolle as Monsieur de la Frade
- Richard Francoeur as Monsieur de Mézères
- Jean Morel as the director
- Roger Vincent as the Academician
- Michel François as Lequerec
- Roger Krebs as Laugier
- Choir - Les Petits Chanteurs à la Croix de Bois
