= René Cloërec =

French composer and conductor

René Cloërec (Paris, 31 May 1911 – Saint-Cloud, 13 December 1995) was a French composer and conductor. While primarily known as a film score composer, he also wrote songs for Edith Piaf.

== Selected filmography ==
- La Grande Meute (The Great Pack, 1945)
- La Cage aux rossignols (A Cage of Nightingales, 1945)
- Sylvie et le fantôme (Sylvie and the Ghost, 1946)
- Gringalet (1946)
- Le visiteur (The Visitor, 1946)
- Le diable au corps (Devil in the Flesh, 1947)
- Les condamnés (Convicted, 1948)
- Les Casse Pieds (The Spice of Life, 1948)
- Dieu a besoin des hommes (God Needs Men, 1950)
- Jeannot l'intrépide (Johnny the Giant Killer, 1950)
- L'auberge rouge (The Red Inn, 1951)
- Les Sept péchés capitaux (The Seven Deadly Sins, 1952)
- Le Bon Dieu sans confession (Good Lord Without Confession, 1953)
- La neige était sale (Stain in the Snow, 1954)
- Le Rouge et le Noir (The Red and the Black, 1954)
- Marguerite de la nuit (Marguerite of the Night, 1955)
- L'affaire des poisons (The Affair of the Poisons, 1955)
- La Traversée de Paris (Trip Across Paris, 1956)
- The Suspects (1957)
- En cas de malheur (Love Is My Profession, 1958)
- Between Love and Duty (1960)
