= Dans l'eau qui fait des bulles =

- Directed by: Maurice Delbez
- Written by: Marcel Prêtre; Maurice Delbez; Michel Lebrun
- Produced by: Marie-Reine Kergal
- Starring: Marthe Mercadier; Jean Richard; Louis de Funès
- Cinematography: Jacques Ledoux
- Edited by: Denise Natot
- Music by: Pierre Dudan
- Distributed by: Les Films Fernand Rivers
- Release date: 25 October 1961 (France)
- Running time: 90 minutes
- Country: France
- Language: French

Dans l'eau qui fait des bulles is a French comedy film from 1961, directed by Maurice Delbez, written by Marcel Prêtre, starring Louis de Funès. In France the film is also known under the title "Le garde-champêtre mène l'enquête" (alternative title); other titles: "Un cadavere in fuga" (Italy), "Louis, die Schnatterschnauze" (West Germany), "Louis, lass die Leiche liegen" (West Germany). The scenario was written on the basis of "Les Pittuiti's" of Michel Duran.

== Cast ==
- Louis de Funès as Paul Ernzer, the fisher who withdraws the body
- Marthe Mercadier as Georgette Ernzer, wife of Paul
- Pierre Dudan as Charles Donadi
- Philippe Lemaire as Heinrich, le convoyeur
- Jacques Castelot as Baumann, the trafficker
- Claudine Coster as Eléna, the teacher of Baumann
- Pierre Doris as Le boy-scout camionneur
- Olivier Hussenot as the commissioner Guillaume
- Maria Riquelme as Arlette Preminger
- Serge Davri as Le vagabond
- Jacques Dufilho as Alphonse, the gravedigger
- Philippe Clay as the storyteller and the voice of dying (Jean-Louis Preminger)
- Max Elloy as a fisher
