= Between Eleven and Midnight =

1949 film

- Directed by: Henri Decoin (as Henry Decoin)
- Written by: Marcel Rivet (adaptation); Henri Decoin (as Henry Decoin)
- Based on: (D'après le roman de); Claude Luxel ("Le sosie de la morgue")
- Produced by: Jacques Roitfeld
- Starring: Louis Jouvet; Madeleine Robinson
- Cinematography: Nicolas Hayer
- Edited by: Annick Millet
- Music by: Henri Sauguet
- Color process: Black and white
- Production company: Les Productions Jacques Roitfeld
- Distributed by: Francinex
- Release date: 23 March 1949
- Running time: 98 minutes
- Country: France
- Language: French

Between Eleven and Midnight (French: Entre onze heures et minuit) is a 1949 French crime mystery film directed by Henri Decoin and starring Louis Jouvet and Madeleine Robinson. Yvette Etiévant appears in an early role. It was shot at the Billancourt Studios in Paris. The film's sets were designed by the art director Emile Alex, the costumes by Jacques Fath.

== Plot ==
The lifeless body of a smuggler is discovered in Paris, killed shortly before midnight. Due to his close physical resemblance to police inspector Carrel, the detective assumes his identity in order to infiltrate the gang.

== Cast ==
- Louis Jouvet as L'inspecteur Carrel
- Madeleine Robinson as Lucienne
- Léo Lapara as L'inspecteur Perpignan
- Monique Mélinand as Irma
- Jean Meyer as Victor (as Jean Meyer de le Comédie Française)
- Simone Sylvestre as Léone
- Janine Viénot as Himself
- Robert Vattier as Charlie
- Jacques Morel as Bouture
- Yvette Etiévant as La fille
- Marianne Hardy as Marie-Louise
- Paul Barge as Le médecin légiste
- Jean-Claude Malouvier as Himself
- Jacques Roux as Himself
- Gisèle Casadesus as Florence (as Gisèle Casadesus de la Comédie Française)
- Robert Arnoux as Rossignol

== See also ==
- List of French films of 1949

== Bibliography ==
- Palmer, Tim & Michael, Charlie. Directory of World Cinema: France. Intellect Books, 2013.
