= Stranger in the House (1967 film) =

British crime film by Pierre Rouve

- Film poster by Arnaldo Putzu
- Directed by: Pierre Rouve
- Written by: Pierre Rouve; Georges Simenon
- Produced by: Anatole de Grunwald; Dimitri De Grunwald
- Starring: James Mason; Geraldine Chaplin; Bobby Darin
- Cinematography: Kenneth Higgins
- Edited by: Ernest Walter
- Music by: John Scott
- Production company: Selmur Productions
- Distributed by: The Rank Organisation (UK); Cinerama Releasing Corporation (USA)
- Release date: May 23, 1967 (London)
- Running time: 104 minutes
- Country: UK
- Language: English
- Budget: $665,000
- Box office: $255,000

Stranger in the House (U.S. title: Cop-Out ) is a 1967 crime film directed by Pierre Rouve and starring James Mason, Geraldine Chaplin and Bobby Darin. It was written by Rouve based on the novel by Georges Simenon, and produced by Anatole de Grunwald. It is a remake of the French film Strangers in the House (Les inconnus dans la maison, 1942). The film was remade again in 1997.

Eric Burdon & the Animals recorded the song "Ain't That So" for the film. The song was co-written by band member Vic Briggs and the composer of the film score, John Scott. It was produced and arranged by Briggs.

== Plot ==
John Sawyer was once a brilliant defence lawyer but his life has taken a downturn. He has become an alcoholic, his wife has left him, his sister is ashamed of him, while his daughter Angela, who still lives in his increasingly shabby large house, despises him. She follows her own life with a wild group of friends led by two rich boys, one of whom is her cousin, Desmond.

Two poor boys are also part of the gang: an American criminal on the run called Barney and a Cypriot immigrant called Jo. Angela falls for Jo. After a vicious fight with Jo, Barney is immobilised and Angela hides him in the attic of her house, where he is shot dead by an intruder. The murder weapon is planted on Jo, who is arrested and put on trial. Nobody in town wants to defend him, so Angela begs her father to do so.

John does not believe the case against Jo and starts his own investigation, through which he gradually gets his own life back together. Through careful observation and questioning, he works out who wanted Barney dead. It was his nephew Desmond, whom Barney humiliated when he hired him a whore. John confronts Desmond in his parents' house and, reading Dostoyevsky to him, makes him see that his only course is to confess. As John leaves the house, a proud and thankful Angela takes his arm.

== Cast ==
- James Mason as John Sawyer
- Geraldine Chaplin as Angela Sawyer
- Bobby Darin as Barney Teale
- Paul Bertoya as Jo Christoforides
- Ian Ogilvy as Desmond Flower
- Bryan Stanyon as Peter Hawkins
- Pippa Steel as Sue Phillips
- Clive Morton as Colonel Flower
- Moira Lister as Mrs. Flower
- James Hayter as Harry Hawkins
- Megs Jenkins as Mrs. Christoforides
- Lisa Daniely as Diana Sawyer
- Ivor Dean as Inspector Colder
- Marjie Lawrence as Brenda
- Yootha Joyce as shooting range girl

== Production ==
The film was shot at MGM's British studios in 1966. Murray Head was in the cast but was fired at the behest of James Mason and replaced by Ian Ogilvy. The film was partially shot in the former Gurney Arms pub in Southampton which was burned down as part of the filming.

Filmink called the movie "one of several thrillers made by Rank that were co-productions partly shot in Europe using international 'names'."

== Reception ==
=== Box office ===
ABC, which had co-produced the film, reported a loss of $795,000 on it.

=== Critical response ===
The Monthly Film Bulletin wrote: "Simenon's novel (first filmed by Henri Decoin with Raimu in 1942) preposterously updated, set in wicked Winchester, and given the full treatment by Pierre Rouve. After looking in at a beat club, where evil teenagers are seen to be smoking pot, we move on to find faded recluse James Mason, whisky bottle at his elbow, old gramophone record on the turntable, musing over his youthful misdemeanours ("Yes, thanks to me they hanged him") in glistening white flashback. Enter Geraldine Chaplin, close-cropped and clad all in white, observing that Winchester is low on the high life, but soon to have her eyes opened by jaunty sailor Bobby Darin, whose vocabulary may be limited to "Ain't that so?" but who has certainly seen the world. It's all absurd enough to be riotously funny, but only Mason seems to have noticed. His deliciously wicked performance (nonchalantly playing with paper-clips in the courtroom, launching into a lengthy reading from Crime and Punishment to clinch his case) seems to belong to quite another movie."

The Radio Times Guide to Films gave the film 2/5 stars, writing: "the highlight here is a solid performance from James Mason as a depressed, drunken ex-barrister who comes out of retirement for a seemingly hopeless murder case involving his daughter's boyfriend. Georges Simenon's novel makes an uneasy transfer to sleepy Hampshire, but reliable British performers are worth picking out in small parts."
