= Simone Valère =

French actress

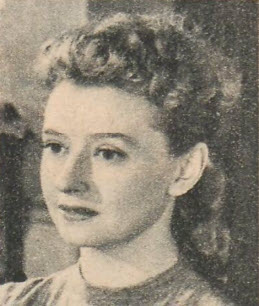
- from Elle, 1952
- Born: 2 August 1921; Paris, France
- Died: 11 November 2010 (aged 89); Roinville, Essonne, France
- Occupation: Actress
- Years active: 1941–1993

Simone Valère (2 August 1921 – 11 November 2010) was a French actress. She appeared in more than forty films from 1941 to 1993.

== Filmography ==
Film
Year	Title	Role	Notes
1941	Premier rendez-vous	Une pensionnaire de l'orphelinat	
1941	The Last of the Six		Uncredited
1942	Miss Bonaparte	Valentine	
1942	Annette and the Blonde Woman	Lucette	
1942	Colonel Pontcarral	Blanche de Mareilhac	
1943	Strange Inheritance	Alice Lepart	
1943	Les Roquevillard	Jeanne Sassenay	
1945	La Fiancée des ténèbres	Dominique	
1945	The Black Cavalier	Lison	
1945	L'extravagante mission	Peggy	
1945	Manon, a 326	Jacqueline	
1946	The Revenge of Roger	Suzanne Laroque	
1948	The Loves of Colette	Simone	
1948	The Cavalier of Croix-Mort	Lucile	
1949	Two Loves	Antoinette	
1949	Manon	Ise La soubrette	
1949	Barry	Angelina Cavazza	
1950	Beauty and the Devil	La Princess	
1951	The Night Is My Kingdom	Louise Louveau	
1951	My Wife Is Formidable	Marguerite Rival	
1952	Jocelyn	Laurence	
1952	Violettes impériales	Eugenia de Montijo	
1955	The Grand Maneuver	Gisele Monnet	
1955	On ne badine pas avec l'amour	Rosette	
1958	The Lord's Vineyard	Gisèle Bourjeon	
1959	Le secret du Chevalier d'Éon	La marquise de Pompadour	
1961	The Triumph of Michael Strogoff	L'impératrice	
1963	Germinal	Madame Hennebau	
1964	Graduation Year	Mme Terrenoire	
1965	The Two Orphans	La comtesse de Linières	
1966	The Game Is Over	Mme. Sernet	Uncredited
1966	Brigade antigangs	Madame Sartet	
1968	Le Franciscain de Bourges	Madame Magnol	
1970	L'ardoise	La femme de Bastien	
1972	The Assassination of Trotsky	Marguerite Rosmer	
1972	Un flic	Paul's Wife	
1990	Équipe de nuit	La mère	
