= Jean-Louis Richard =

French actor, film director and scriptwriter

- Born: Jean Marius Richard; 17 May 1927; Paris, France
- Died: 3 June 2012 (aged 85); Paris, France
- Occupations: Actor, film director, screenwriter
- Spouse: Jeanne Moreau (m. 1949; div. 1951)

Jean-Louis Richard (17 May 1927 – 3 June 2012) was a French actor, film director and scriptwriter.

== Biography ==
Born as Jean Marius Richard in Paris, Richard was Jeanne Moreau's first husband from 1949 to 1951.

== Partial filmography ==
- 1960: À bout de souffle (by Jean-Luc Godard) – A Journalist (uncredited)
- 1960: Austerlitz (by Abel Gance)
- 1961: Me faire ça à moi – Chief
- 1962: Good Luck, Charlie
- 1962: Jules et Jim (by François Truffaut) – Café customer (uncredited)
- 1963: La Peau douce (by François Truffaut) – Man in the street (uncredited)
- 1964: Mata Hari, Agent H21
- 1966: Fahrenheit 451
- 1968: Je t'aime, je t'aime (by Alain Resnais) – L'homme du wagon-restaurant
- 1980: Le Dernier Métro (by François Truffaut) – Daxiat
- 1981: Le Professionnel (by Georges Lautner) – Colonel Martin
- 1982: Le Choc (by Robin Davis) – Maubert, l'inspecteur de la DST
- 1982: Le gendarme et les gendarmettes (by Jean Girault et Tony Aboyantz) – The Brain
- 1983: Life Is a Bed of Roses – Pére Jean Watelet
- 1983: Confidentially Yours (by François Truffaut) – Louison
- 1983: Le Marginal (by Jacques Deray) – Antoine
- 1984: Swann in Love – Monsieur Verdurin
- 1984: Fort Saganne (by Alain Corneau) – Flammarin
- 1986: La femme secrète – Stirner
- 1987: Hôtel de France – Pierre Galtier
- 1988: Quelques jours avec moi (by Claude Sautet) – Dr Appert
- 1989: Les deux Fragonard – Saint-Julien
- 1991: Août – Lance
- 1992: The Sentinel – Bleicher
- 1992: La nuit de l'océan – Capitaine du chalutier
- 1992: L'Inconnu dans la maison (by Georges Lautner) – Lawyer
- 1993: Tombés du ciel (by Philippe Lioret) – Monsieur Armanet
- 1994: Joan the Maiden (Part 1: The Battles and Joan the Maiden) (by Jacques Rivette) – La Trémoille
- 1994: Joan the Maiden (Part 2: The Prisons) (by Jacques Rivette) – La Trémoille
- 1994: Grosse fatigue (by Michel Blanc) – Psychiatrist
- 1995: The Bait (L'Appât) (by Bertrand Tavernier) – Inn keeper
- 1995: L'Année Juliette – Sobel
- 1995: N'oublie pas que tu vas mourir (by Xavier Beauvois) – Benoît's father
- 1995: Fiesta – Commandant Romerales
- 1996: Stabat mater – Jean
- 1997: Lucie Aubrac (by Claude Berri) – Monsieur Henry
- 1997: After Sex (by Brigitte Roüan) – Weyoman–Lebeau
- 1997: Marianne
- 1997: Messieurs les enfants (by Pierre Boutron) – Albert Crastaing
- 1998: The School of Flesh – M. Thorpe
- 1998: Cantique de la racaille – Alexandre
- 1999: Peau d'homme cœur de bête (by Hélène Angel) – Tac Tac
- 2000: Le prof – Père Alexandre
- 2001: J'ai faim !!! (by Florence Quentin) – Montalembert
- 2002: Adolphe (by Benoît Jacquot) – Mr. d'Arbigny
- 2003: La vie nue – Le patron
- 2003: Mister V. (by Émilie Deleuze) – Patrice Lemoigne
- 2003: Mauvais esprit (by Patrick Alessandrin) – Docteur Drey (final film role)
