= The Strangers in the House =

1940 novel by Georges Simenon

- First UK edition (publ. Routledge and Kegan Paul, 1951)
- Author: Georges Simenon
- Original title: Les Inconnus dans la maison
- Language: French
- Publisher: Gallimard
- Publication date: 1940
- Publication place: France
- English publication date: 1951
- Media type: Print

Les Inconnus dans la maison (The Strangers in the House) is a novel by Belgian author Georges Simenon. It was first published in 1940 by Gallimard in Paris.

An English translation by Geoffrey Sainsbury was published in the UK in 1951; it was reissued by New York Review Books Classics in 2006 with an introduction by P.D. James. A second English translation, by Robert Baldick, was published by Penguin Books in 1967.

== Synopsis ==
After his wife left him and their young daughter in favor of another man, Hector Loursat gave up on almost everything in life. Throwing away his law career in favor of alcoholism and reading, Hector paid little attention to his daughter Nicole, unsure if he was even her true father. As such, he was largely unaware of her life until he heard someone fire a gun within the house. Upon investigating, Hector discovers a man dead in one of the bedrooms. Nicole, now a teenager, and her friends brought him home after hitting them with their car, only for one of the group to murder him. The authorities believe the killer to be Nicole's boyfriend, Emile, and quickly charge him.

To the surprise of some, Hector takes up Emile's defense, as he ultimately believes the young man to be innocent. Proving this requires Hector to team up with his daughter Nicole, who only somewhat tolerates him as a result of years of neglect.

== Adaptations ==
The Strangers in the House has received four film adaptations, the first of which was a 1942 French film directed by Henri Decoin. This adaptation featured Raimu as Hector Loursat and André Reybaz as Émile Manu. An adaptation and remake of the French film followed in 1967, starring James Mason and Bobby Darin as the fallen lawyer and the young man accused of murder. Geraldine Chaplin, the fourth child of actor Charlie Chaplin, starred as the daughter. The film underperformed at the box office, with the studio reporting a loss of $795,000. This film was itself later remade in 1997. A second French adaptation was made in 1992, L'Inconnu dans la maison, starring Jean-Paul Belmondo as Jacques Loursat.

== Reception ==
The novel has been described as "wonderfully claustrophobic". John Banville regards Strangers in the House as one of Simenon's finest novels and "the quintessential roman dur: direct, spare, sensuously atmospheric, hypnotic in its realism, and honest in a way that few novelists would dare to be."
