= Stranger in the House (1992 film) =

1992 film by Georges Lautner

- Directed by: Georges Lautner
- Screenplay by: Georges Lautner; Jean Lartéguy; Bernard Stora
- Based on: L'Inconnu dans la maison by Georges Simenon
- Produced by: Raymond Danon; Jacques Dorfmann
- Starring: Jean-Paul Belmondo
- Cinematography: Jean-Yves Le Mener
- Edited by: Georges Klotz
- Music by: Francis Lai
- Production companies: Annabel Productions; Les Films Alain Sarde; TF1 Films Production; Canal+
- Distributed by: AMLF
- Release date: 1992
- Running time: 104 minutes
- Country: France
- Language: French
- Budget: $8.4 million
- Box office: $3.1 million

Stranger in the House (French: L'inconnu dans la maison) is a 1992 French crime drama directed by Georges Lautner and starring Jean Paul Belmondo. It is based on a novel by Georges Simenon, previously filmed by Henri Decoin in 1942.

The film marked the director's fifth and last collaboration with Belmondo, and was a commercial failure on its release. It had 413,794 admissions in France.

== Plot ==
Jacques Emile Marie Loursat is a brilliant lawyer who descended into alcoholism following his wife's suicide. His daughter, Isabelle, who blames him for her mother's death, hasn't spoken to him in ten years. One night, while returning home drunk from a brothel, Loursat hears a gunshot inside his house. Shortly after, he discovers someone dying on the second floor: Joël Cloarec. Police suspicions quickly fall on Antoine Manu, Isabelle's friend, who is charged and then sent to trial. Loursat takes on his defense.

== Cast ==
- Jean-Paul Belmondo : Lawyer Jacques Loursat
- Renée Faure : Fine
- Cristiana Réali : Isabelle Loursat
- Sébastien Tavel : Antoine Manu
- François Perrot : Commissioner Binet
- Georges Géret : Ange Brunetti
- Hubert Deschamps : Beaupoil
- Sandrine Kiberlain : Marie Maitray
- Geneviève Page : Loursat's sister
- Jean-Louis Richard : Le Procureur général
- Guy Tréjan : Le bâtonnier
- Pierre Vernier : le président de la Cour d'assise
- Mario David : Pascal Abecassis's father
- Odette Laure : La patronne
