= José-André Lacour =

Belgian novelist and dramatist

José-André Lacour (October 27, 1919 Gilly, Belgium - November 13, 2005 Paris) was a Belgian novelist, playwright, translator, screenwriter and director.

== Biography ==
Of Belgian origin, José-André Lacour was born in Gilly, a suburb of Charleroi. After studying at the University of Brussels, he published his first novel in Belgium, Panique en Occident (on the theme of the Occupation) then in 1949 with Julliard: Punishment of the victims. In 1954 he published the detective novel La Mort en ce jardin, adapted for the cinema under the same title in 1956 by Luis Buñuel on dialogues by Raymond Queneau.

He became known as a playwright: some of his plays were very successful, in particular Our Skin, with Daniel Gélin, directed by Michel Vitold. L'Année du bac, a play on the conflict between generations, was premiered in Paris in 1958, with René Lefèvre, Sami Frey and Jacques Perrin, directed by Yves Robert. This play will be translated into a dozen languages and performed over 2,500 times around the world1.

He adapted for the theater Ouragan on the Caine, after Herman Wouk.

He died of cardiac arrest on November 13, 2005, at the age of 86. He married Gerty Colin, the journalist who wrote biographies of Maurice Chevalier and Jean Gabin, published Les Châtelains de Laeken: love and the crown at the court of Belgium (Robert Laffont), a sentimental history of the Belgian dynasty, and novelized the Chateauvallon television series under the pseudonym Éliane Roche. His grandson is the writer and publisher José-Louis Bocquet.
