= Jean Dréville =

French film director

- Born: 20 September 1906; Vitry-sur-Seine, France
- Died: 5 March 1997 (aged 90); Vallangoujard, France
- Occupation: Film director
- Years active: 1928-1969

Jean Dréville (20 September 1906 – 5 March 1997) was a French film director. He directed more than 40 films between 1928 and 1969.

== Selected filmography ==
- Autour de L'Argent (1928)
- A Man of Gold (1934)
- The Chess Player (1938)
- White Nights in Saint Petersburg (1938)
- His Uncle from Normandy (1939)
- President Haudecoeur (1940)
- Annette and the Blonde Woman (1942)
- Business Is Business (1942)
- A Cage of Nightingales (1945)
- The Visitor (1946)
- The Spice of Life (1948)
- Return to Life (1949)
- The Girl with the Whip (1952)
- The Secret of the Mountain Lake (1952)
- Endless Horizons (1953)
- Queen Margot (1954)
- Stopover in Orly (1955)
- The Suspects (1957)
- A Dog, a Mouse, and a Sputnik (1958)
- Nights of Farewell (1965)
- The Last of the Mohicans (1968)
