= The Strangers in the House (film) =

1942 film

Les Inconnus dans la maison
- Film poster
- Directed by: Henri Decoin
- Written by: Henri-Georges Clouzot, after Georges Simenon's novel The Strangers in the House
- Starring: Raimu; Marcel Mouloudji; Martine Carol; Daniel Gélin; Noël Roquevert
- Cinematography: Jules Kruger
- Edited by: Marguerite Beaugé
- Music by: Roland-Manuel
- Production company: Continental Films
- Distributed by: L'Alliance Cinématographique Européenne (ACE)
- Release date: 16 May 1942
- Running time: 95 minutes
- Country: France
- Language: French

The Strangers in the House (Les Inconnus dans la maison) is a 1942 French crime film by Henri Decoin after the novel by the same name by Georges Simenon in 1940.

It was shot at the Billancourt Studios in Paris.

== Plot ==
Hector Loursat, attorney at law, lives with his daughter, Nicole, in a vast and shabby mansion in a provincial town. Their conversation with each other is limited, each somehow holding the other one responsible for the situation: Hector Loursat used to be one of the great attorneys until his wife left him for another man eighteen years ago. He has been drinking ever since, and given up living altogether, intoxicated every night. Hector did not care much about his daughter, who was brought up by Fine, the old woman servant in the house.

One night, gunshots are heard upstairs in the house and Hector spots a shadow running away. Hector goes upstairs with Nicole and finds a dead man lying on an old bed in the attic. The police arrive and investigate. Hector soon finds out his daughter has a kind of secret life with a band of young idle bourgeois from the town; they have regular meetings in the attic.

The police soon determine that the dead man is called Gros Louis, with a criminal record. Nicole and her friends are being interrogated by the police. But how is Gros Louis linked to the group? They find out the young group have set up amongst themselves a sort of pact, a theft competition which started by stealing a ballpoint or a lighter, and was amplified by boredom up to grand theft auto. Thus, they were turned delinquents by ennui. The police also finds out that one of them, Emile, is Nicole's boyfriend. Did he kill Gros Louis because of jealousy? Emile is suspected, and arrested. In jail, Emile asks Hector Loursat to be his attorney. Hector, scenting a miscarriage of justice, agrees to be his defense attorney.

At the trial, the prosecution produces many bona fide witnesses, all bourgeois parents. Hector Loursat does not budge, has no questions to ask the witnesses, doesn't seem to be there altogether, to the point where people, and his daughter among them, wonder, with awe, if he is not still drinking. When finally Hector Loursat stands up and speaks, everyone is bewildered by his speech and strategy. First, he does not want to call any defense witnesses, but instead wants all the prosecution witnesses to come back to the stand, and accuses them all of being responsible for the boredom of the town, responsible for the boredom and nonsense and stupid behavior of their young ones, then singles out the fact that only one girl - his own daughter, Nicole - was in the group. By interrogating each of the young men, he shows that every one of them was in love with her, except, apparently, one, Luska. But Hector Loursat soon proves Luska was the one most in love with Nicole, that he found out Emile was Nicole's boyfriend, and that he killed Gros Louis to have Emile accused, moved aside and framed. At this point, Luska cracks up, confesses, and is arrested. Nicole falls into her father's arms.

== Cast ==
- Raimu : Hector Loursat
- André Reybaz as Émile Manu
- Tania Fédor as Marthe Dossin
- Héléna Manson as Mme Manu
- Gabrielle Fontan as Fine, the old maid
- Marcel Mouloudji as Amédée or Ephraïm Luska (Marcel Mouloudjy)
- Noël Roquevert as commissaire Alfred Binet
- Jacques Grétillat as court president
- Martine Carol as a court spectator (uncredited)
- Jean Négroni
- Daniel Gélin
- Marguerite Ducouret as Angèle, the cook
- Lucien Coëdel as the bar tenant
- Marc Doelnitz as Edmond Dossin
- Juliette Faber as Nicole Loursat
- Jacques Baumer as the attorney Rogissart
- Génia Vaury as Mme Laurence Rogissart
- Jean Tissier as judge Ducup
- Raymond Cordy as a huissier
- Lucien Bryonne as a police officer
- Fernand Flament as a police officer
- Paul Barge as prison gard (uncredited)
- Langlois as uncle Daillat (uncredited)
- Henri Delivry
- Jacques Denoël
- Lise Donat
- Franck Maurice
- Bernard Noël
- Claire Olivier
- Max Révol
- Pierre Ringel
- Yvonne Scheffer
- Simone Sylvestre
- Charles Vissières
- Pierre Fresnay: narrator
