= Maurice Delbez =

French film director (1922–2020)

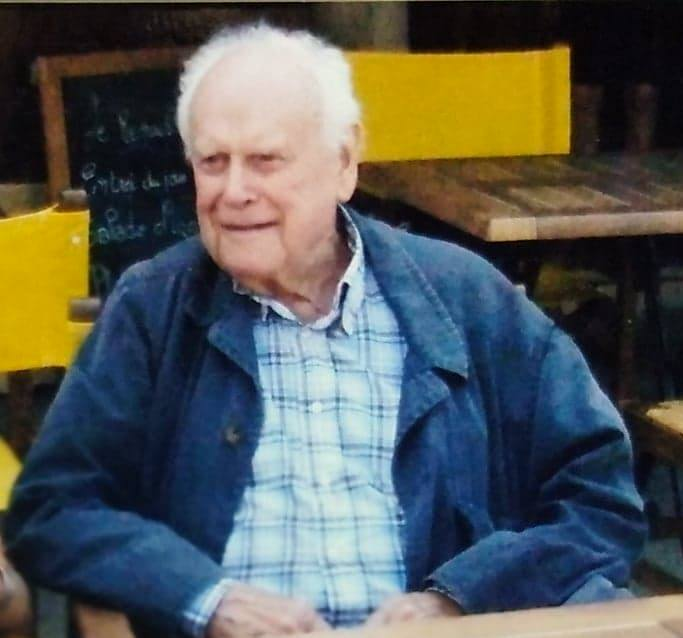
- Delbez in 2011
- Born: 28 July 1922; Bezons, France
- Died: 23 March 2020 (aged 97)
- Occupation: Director

Maurice Delbez (28 July 1922 – 23 March 2020) was a French film director.

== Biography ==
From the age of 12, Delbez attended the Lycée Charlemagne in Paris. His parents sold their bistro and took up multiple jobs to help pay for this education. During World War II, Delbez, along with other self-proclaimed pacifist students, led a series of protests against German Occupation.

While working in the office of the Treasury, Delbez met Comédie-Française member Julien Bertheau, who inspired Delbez to create a theatre troupe. Summoned to the Service du travail obligatoire in 1943, he was able to cross the dividing line with false papers and join the Free France forces in Auvergne.

After the war, Delbez entered the Institut des hautes études cinématographiques. The actor Pierre Fresnay put him in contact with director Maurice Cloche, with whom he would direct several films as an assistant. Delbez worked alongside Jean Grémillon, Robert Bresson, Guy Lefranc, and Darry Cowl. His best known film is On Foot, on Horse, and on Wheels. In 1963, he adapted Robert Sabatier's Alain et le Nègre. However, the film was titled Rue des Cascades.

Delbez also worked in television, notably producing documentaries such as "La Mémoire aux images", which was broadcast on France 3. His documentaries were typically broadcast on France 3 and France 2.

He wrote his autobiography, Ma vie racontée à mon chien cinéphile, in 2001. It was published by L'Harmattan.

In May 2017, the Société nouvelle de cinématographie (SNC) and Celluloid Angels raised funds to restore Rue des Cascades. In 2018, M6 restored the film and released it on DVD. The channel also restored and distributed other Delbez films. In 2019, Rue des Cascades was screened in Salon-de-Provence.

Maurice Delbez died on 23 March 2020 at the age of 97.

== Filmography ==
=== Director ===
- The Wheel (1957)
- On Foot, on Horse, and on Wheels (1957)
- And Your Sister? (1958)
- Dans l'eau qui fait des bulles (1961)
- L'inspecteur Leclerc enquête (1962)
- Un gosse de la butte (1964)
- Graduation Year (1964)
- Jealous as a Tiger (1964)
- Les Saintes chéries (1965, 1966)
- L'Amateur ou S.O.S. Fernand (1967)
- Destins (1973)
- Les Menteurs (1980)
- Des vertes et des pas mûres (1980)
- Gilles Grangier : 50 ans de cinéma (1990)

=== Screenwriter ===
- Les Dragueurs (1959)

=== Assistant Director ===
- Doctor Laennec (1949)
- Cage of Girls (1949)
- Ballerina (1950)
- Born of Unknown Father (1950)
- Dr. Knock (1951)
- Une histoire d'amour (1951)
- Le Voyage en Amérique (1952)
- The Man in My Life (1952)
- She and Me (1952)
- Les Révoltés de Lomanach (1954)
- Service Entrance (1954)
- Le Fil à la patte (1954)
- Milord l'Arsouille (1955)
- Les Aristocrates (1955)
- Le Salaire du péché (1956)
- Le Voyage du père (1966)
- Les malabars sont au parfum (1966)

=== Production Manager ===
- Les Idoles (1968)
- La Grande Frime (1977)

=== Technical Advisor ===
- Le Panier à crabes (1960)
- Les Nymphettes (1961)
- Jaloux comme un tigre (1964)
- Le Paria (1969)
