= Chéri-Bibi =

Chéri-Bibi may refer to:

- A series of serial novels by Gaston Leroux
- Chéri-Bibi and Cécily, a 1916 novel by Leroux
- Cheri-Bibi (1931 film), a 1931 U.S. Spanish-language film directed by Carlos F. Borcosque
- Chéri-Bibi (1938 film), a 1938 French film directed by Léon Mathot
- Chéri-Bibi (1955 film), a 1955 French-Italian film directed by Marcello Pagliero
- Chéri-Bibi (TV series), a 1974 French television series
