= Le Parfum de la dame en noir =

Le Parfum de la dame en noir is a novel by Gaston Leroux featuring the character of Joseph Rouletabille. It was adapted for the screen four times:

- Le Parfum de la dame en noir (1914 film)
- Le Parfum de la dame en noir (1931 film)
- Le Parfum de la dame en noir (1949 film)
- Le Parfum de la dame en noir (2005 film)
