= The Perfume of the Lady in Black (disambiguation) =

The Perfume of the Lady in Black is a 1974 giallo film directed by Francesco Barilli.

The Perfume of the Lady in Black may also refer to:

- The Perfume of the Lady in Black (novel), a 1908 mystery novel by Gaston Leroux
- The Perfume of the Lady in Black (1931 film), a French mystery directed by Marcel L'Herbier
- The Perfume of the Lady in Black (1949 film), a French mystery directed by Louis Daquin
- The Perfume of the Lady in Black (2005 film), a French comedy mystery directed by Bruno Podalydès
