= The Mystery of the Yellow Room (1913 film) =

1913 film by Emile Chautard and Maurice Tourneur

- Directed by: Emile Chautard; Maurice Tourneur
- Written by: Maurice Tourneur
- Based on: The Mystery of the Yellow Room by Gaston Leroux
- Starring: Marcel Simon
- Production company: Eclair
- Distributed by: Eclair
- Release date: 11 April 1913
- Running time: 32 minutes
- Country: France
- Languages: Silent; French intertitles

The Mystery of the Yellow Room (French: lang|fr|Le mystère de la chambre jaune) is a 1913 French silent mystery film directed by Emile Chautard and Maurice Tourneur and starring Marcel Simon as the amateur detective Joseph Rouletabille. It was the first film adaptation of the 1908 novel The Mystery of the Yellow Room by Gaston Leroux. Chautard remade the film in the United States in 1919.

== Synopsis ==
In a classic locked-room mystery, Mathilde has been attacked and valuable scientific papers of her father stolen. It appears as through nobody could possible have entered the room and Larsen of the Sûreté is baffled. It falls to the journalist Rouletabille to demonstrate the answer to the case.

== Cast ==
- Marcel Simon as Rouletabille
- Jean Garat as Jean Roussel
- Laurence Duluc as Mathilde Strangerson
- Paul Escoffier as Detective Larsen
- André Liabel as Robert Darzac
- Fernande van Doren
- Maurice de Féraudy
- Devalence

== Bibliography ==
- Goble, Alan. The Complete Index to Literary Sources in Film. Walter de Gruyter, 1999.
- T. Soister, John, Nicolella, Henry & Joyce, Steve. American Silent Horror, Science Fiction and Fantasy Feature Films, 1913–1929. McFarland, 2014.
- Wlaschin, Ken. Silent Mystery and Detective Movies: A Comprehensive Filmography. McFarland, 2009.
