= The Mystery of the Yellow Room (1919 film) =

1919 film

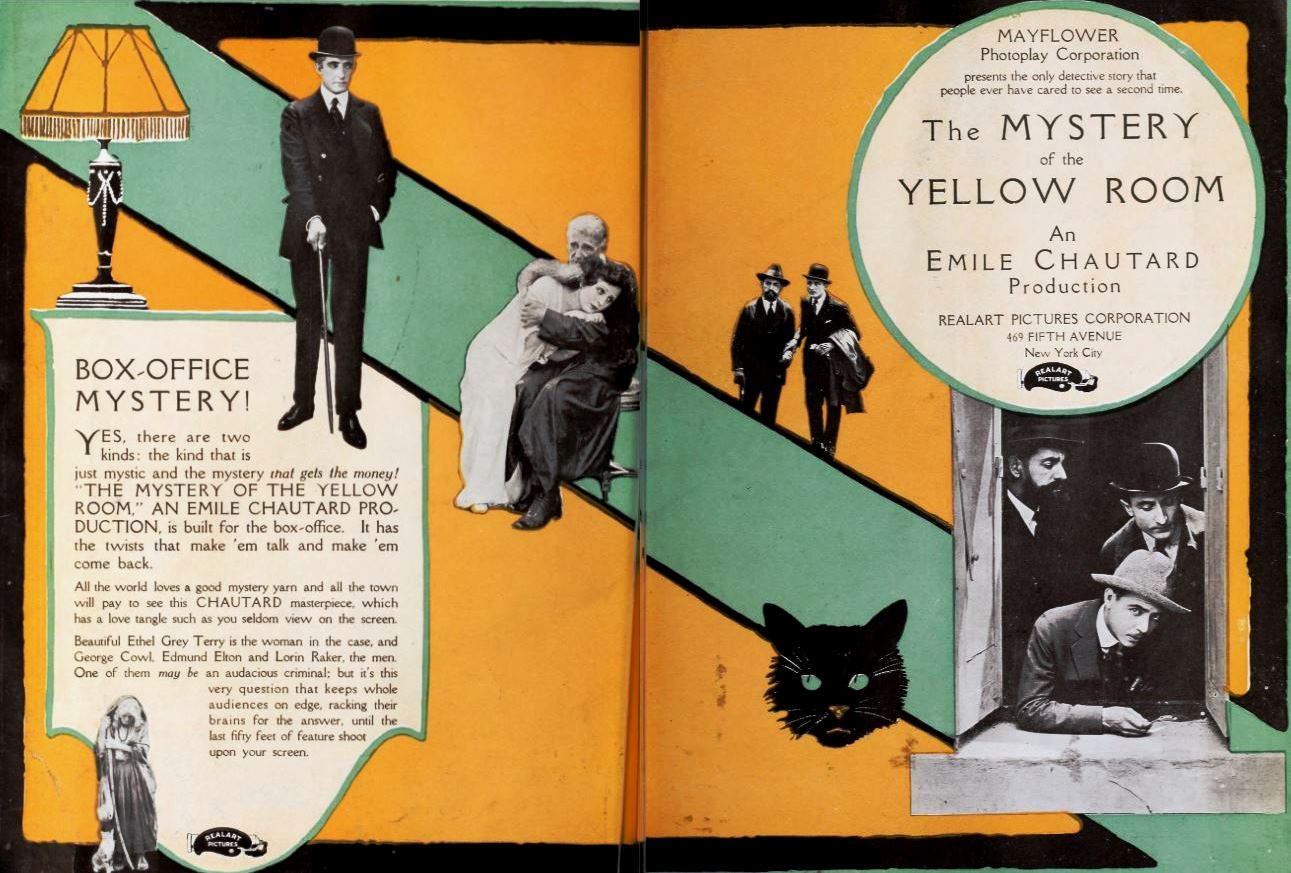
- Advertisement for film
- Directed by: Émile Chautard
- Written by: Émile Chautard
- Based on: The Mystery of the Yellow Room by Gaston Leroux
- Produced by: Émile Chautard
- Starring: William Walcott; Edmund Elton
- Cinematography: Jacques Bizeul (fr)
- Production company: Mayflower Photoplay Company
- Distributed by: Realart Pictures Corporation
- Release date: October 19, 1919
- Running time: 60 minutes
- Country: United States
- Language: Silent (English intertitles)

The Mystery of the Yellow Room is a 1919 American crime drama film made by the Mayflower Photoplay Company and distributed through Realart Pictures Corporation. Émile Chautard served as a producer.

The Mystery of the Yellow Room (in French Le mystère de la chambre jaune) was originally a novel by Gaston Leroux, one of the first locked room mystery novels. It was first published in France in the periodical L'Illustration from September 1907 to November 1907, then in its own right as a book in 1908.

The film, which itself is a remake of Chautard's "Le Mystère de la chambre jaune" (1913), was remade in 1930, 1949 and in 2003.

== Plot ==
Mathilde Strangerson, whose father is a renowned French scientist, is heard to utter a piercing scream while supposedly alone in her room. Her father and others rush to the scene and find a room so securely locked and barred that no one could have entered or made their escape. She receives medical care while detectives are called in to investigate the case. Each has their pet theory about the crime, all of which seem to be based on logic. Gradually the light of suspicion filters through the members of the household and those associated with it. Mathilde's fiancée is placed in prison to await trial as most of the evidence points to him as the criminal. Then, Joseph Rouletabille is called in to decipher the mystery. Rouletabille finds that the detective who was most persistent in his investigation is responsible. Mathilde's fiancée is then released and a happy ending occurs.

== Cast ==
- William Walcott as Professor Strangerson
- Edmund Elton as Robert Darzac
- George Cowl as Frederic Larsan
- Ethel Grey Terry as Mathilde Strangerson
- Lorin Raker as Rouletabille / Joe-Jo
- Jean Del Val as Jean Sainclair
- W.H. Burton as Daddy Jacques
- Henry S. Koser as Bernier
- Jean Ewing as Mme. Bernier
- William Morrison as Judge de Marquet
- Louis R. Grisel as Monsieur Maleine
- John McQuire as Mathieu
- Catherine Ashley as Mme. Mathieu
- Ivan Dobble as The Green Man

== See also ==
- Whodunit

== External list ==
- The Mystery of the Yellow Room at IMDb
