= The Crime of Rouletabille =

1921 novel by Gaston Leroux

- 1952 edition
- Author: Gaston Leroux
- Language: French
- Genre: Mystery
- Publication date: 1921
- Publication place: France
- Media type: Print
- Preceded by: Rouletabille at Krupp's
- Followed by: Rouletabille and the Gypsies

The Crime of Rouletabille (French: Le Crime de Rouletabille) is a 1921 mystery novel by the French writer Gaston Leroux. It is the sixth in his series of novels featuring the fictional detective Joseph Rouletabille, that began with The Mystery of the Yellow Room and The Perfume of the Lady in Black.

== Synopsis ==
Rouletabille is falsely accused of murdering a professor and his wife.

== Bibliography ==
- Fiona Kelleghan. 100 Masters of Mystery and Detective Fiction: Baynard H. Kendrick. Salem Press, 2001.
