= Rouletabille the Aviator =

1932 film

- Directed by: Steve Sekely
- Written by: Pierre-Gilles Veber
- Based on: Joseph Rouletabille by Gaston Leroux
- Produced by: Maurice Orienter; Adolphe Osso
- Starring: Roland Toutain; Léon Belières; Germaine Aussey
- Cinematography: István Eiben; J. Peverell Marley; Gérard Perrin; Fédote Bourgasoff
- Edited by: Lothar Wolff
- Music by: Georges Van Parys
- Production company: Les Films Osso
- Distributed by: Les Films Osso
- Release date: 9 December 1932
- Running time: 82 minutes
- Country: France
- Language: French

Rouletabille the Aviator (French: Rouletabille aviateur) is a 1932 French thriller film directed by Steve Sekely and starring Roland Toutain, Léon Belières and Germaine Aussey. The film was inspired by the Joseph Rouletabille stories of Gaston Leroux. It was shot at the Hunnia Studios in Budapest. The film's sets were designed by the art director Serge Piménoff. A separate Hungarian-language version Flying Gold was also produced.

== Synopsis ==
While on holiday in Budapest, journalist Joseph Rouletabille discovers that a plane carrying a consignment of gold belonging to the Bank of France has been hijacked and crashed. With the assistance of Rosy, the daughter of Budapest's police commissioner, he sets out to investigate.

== Cast ==
- Roland Toutain as Joseph Rouletabille
- Léon Belières as Sainclair
- Germaine Aussey as Sonia
- Lisette Lanvin as Rosy Bathory
- Théa Dory as Amie de Rosy
- Maurice Maillot as George K. George
- Abel Duroy as Hubner
- Léonce Corne as Commissaire Moreau
- Sándor Góth as Bathory

== Bibliography ==
- Bessy, Maurice & Chirat, Raymond. Histoire du cinéma français: 1929–1934. Pygmalion, 1988.
- Crisp, Colin. Genre, Myth and Convention in the French Cinema, 1929–1939. Indiana University Press, 2002.
- Rège, Philippe. Encyclopedia of French Film Directors, Volume 1. Scarecrow Press, 2009.
