= The Yellow Room =

The Yellow Room may refer to

- The Yellow Room (1891), a work of sadism and masochism in fiction
- The Yellow Room (1945), a novel by Mary Roberts Rinehart
- The Mystery of the Yellow Room (1907), a detective story by Gaston Leroux
- Bedroom in Arles, a painting by Vincent van Gogh
- The Yellow Oval Room in the White House, Washington, DC
