= The Secret of the Night =

1913 novel by Gaston Leroux

- Author: Gaston Leroux
- Language: French
- Genre: Mystery
- Publication date: 1913
- Publication place: France
- Media type: Print
- Preceded by: The Perfume of the Lady in Black
- Followed by: Rouletabille at War

The Secret of the Night or Rouletabille and the Tsar (French: Rouletabille chez le Tsar) is a 1913 mystery novel by the French writer Gaston Leroux. It is the third in his series of novels featuring the fictional detective Joseph Rouletabille, following on from The Mystery of the Yellow Room and The Perfume of the Lady in Black.

Unlike its two predecessors it has never been made into a film. However, there was a television adaptation produced in 1966.

== Synopsis ==
In 1905, Joseph Rouletabille is employed by Nicholas II of Russia to watch over one of his Generals whose life has been threatened by revolutionaries.

== Bibliography ==
- Fiona Kelleghan. 100 Masters of Mystery and Detective Fiction: Baynard H. Kendrick. Salem Press, 2001.
