= Rim of the Pit =

1944 novel by Hake Talbot

- First edition
- Author: Hake Talbot
- Cover artist: H. Lawrence Hoffman
- Language: English
- Genre: Novel
- Publisher: Simon & Schuster
- Publication date: 1944
- Publication place: United States
- Media type: Print
- Pages: 184
- ISBN: 978-1605433592

Rim of the Pit (1944) is a locked-room mystery novel written by Hake Talbot, a pen name of Henning Nelms. Nelms, as Talbot, published one other mystery novel as well as two short stories.

== Plot ==
A group of people gather at a remote snowbound lodge in the wilds of northern New England. A seance is held in order to reach the dead husband of the medium. Remarried, the medium's new husband wants permission from the dead man to open a tract of land to logging. During the seance, it appears that the spirit of the dead man returns to possess one of the group, using him as an instrument to murder another of the group.

The hero, Rogan Kincaid, is an adventurer who takes it upon himself (with help from a Czech refugee, the daughter of the dead man, and others), to solve the mystery before the police are brought in. As impossibilities pile up (including a locked room murder, footprints that begin and end in the middle of an expanse of snow, and a murderer who seems to be able to fly after being taken over by a Windigo), it looks like the only explanation is a supernatural one.

== Reception ==
In a poll of 17 detective story writers and reviewers, this novel was voted as the second best locked room mystery of all time, behind John Dickson Carr's The Hollow Man (1935) and before Gaston Leroux's The Mystery of the Yellow Room (1907-1908).
