= The Mystery of the Yellow Room (1930 film) =

1930 film directed by Marcel L'Herbier

- Directed by: Marcel L'Herbier
- Written by: Gaston Leroux (novel); Marcel L'Herbier
- Produced by: Adolphe Osso
- Starring: Roland Toutain; Huguette Duflos; Léon Belières
- Cinematography: Léonce-Henri Burel; Nikolai Toporkoff
- Edited by: Marguerite Beaugé
- Music by: Edouard Flament
- Production company: Les Films Osso
- Distributed by: Les Films Osso
- Release date: 18 September 1930
- Running time: 108 minutes
- Country: France
- Language: French

The Mystery of the Yellow Room (French: Le mystère de la chambre jaune) is a 1930 French mystery film directed by Marcel L'Herbier and starring Roland Toutain, Huguette Duflos, and Léon Belières. It is based on the 1907 novel of the same title by Gaston Leroux. L'Herbier made a sequel, The Perfume of the Lady in Black, the following year.

The film's sets were designed by the art directors Lazare Meerson and Lucien Jaquelux.

== Cast ==
- Roland Toutain as Joseph Rouletabille
- Huguette Duflos as Mathilde Stangerson
- Léon Belières as Sainclair
- Edmond Van Daële as Robert Darzac
- Marcel Vibert as Frédéric Larsan
- Maxime Desjardins as Professeur Stangerson
- Pierre Juvenet as Le juge
- Henri Kerny as Père Jacques
- Charles Redgie as Le garde-chasse
- Kissa Kouprine as Marie
- Jean Diéner as L'avocat
- Marcel Vallée as Journaliste
- Duchange as Journaliste
- Georges Tréville as Le président

== Bibliography ==
- Dayna Oscherwitz & MaryEllen Higgins. The A to Z of French Cinema. Scarecrow Press, 2009.
