= Joseph Rouletabille =

French fictional detective

- This illustration by Simont appeared on October 19, 1907, on the cover of the French newspaper L'Illustration.
- First appearance: The Mystery of the Yellow Room
- Last appearance: Rouletabille and the Gypsies
- Created by: Gaston Leroux

In-universe information
- Gender: Male
- Occupation: Journalist
- Nationality: French

Joseph Rouletabille (French pronunciation: [ʒozɛf ʁultabij]) is a fictional character created by Gaston Leroux, a French writer and journalist. Rouletabille is an amateur sleuth featured in several novels and other works, often presented as a more capable thinker than the police.

Rouletabille (literally roule ta bille, or "Roll your marble") is French slang for "globetrotter", one who has been around the world and seen it all. The meaning was later expanded to that of a cool-headed, unfazeable, or nonchalant person.

== Overview ==
In the first novel, The Mystery of the Yellow Room, Rouletabille solves an attempted murder in a locked room mystery. The book reveals that Rouletabille is the nickname of 18-year-old journalist Joseph Joséphin, who was raised in a religious orphanage in Eu, a small town near Fécamp.

In the novel Rouletabille meets Ballmeyer, an international criminal of great repute and many identities (a character possibly inspired by fictional Arsène Lupin). As Jean Roussel, Ballmeyer married a rich heiress, Mathilde Stangerson, the Lady in Black of the second novel.

Ballmeyer returns in The Perfume of the Lady in Black at the end of the story, which takes place in a castle on the French Riviera. Rouletabille finds that he is the son of Ballmeyer and Stangerson. Soon afterwards, Rouletabille is summoned to Russia by the Czar, where he solves murder attempts on a general.

The next novel takes place in 1912. The fearless journalist marries the beautiful Ivana Vilitchkov and defeats the brutal warlord Gaulow.

In Rouletabille chez Krupp, Rouletabille acts as a French secret agent and infiltrates the Krupp factories. This is one of the earliest espionage thrillers. Rouletabille saves Paris from being annihilated by a German missile.

In Le Crime de Rouletabille, the reporter is almost framed for Ivana's murder. Then, in Rouletabille chez les Bohémiens, he helps recover a sacred book stolen from the Gypsies.

== Books ==
1. Le Mystère de la Chambre Jaune (The Mystery of the Yellow Room) (serial. in L'Illustration, 1907; rep. Lafitte, 1908) (new translation by Jean-Marc Lofficier & Randy Lofficier as Rouletabille and The Mystery of the Yellow Room (2009), ISBN 978-1-934543-60-3)
2. Le Parfum de la Dame en Noir (The Perfume of the Lady in Black) (serial. in L'Illustration, 1908; rep. Lafitte, 1909)
3. Rouletabille chez le Tsar (Rouletabille and the Czar) (serial. in L'Illustration, rep. Lafitte, 1913). Reprinted as The Secret of the Night in the U.S.
4. Rouletabille à la Guerre (Rouletabille at War) (serial. in Le Matin, 1914; rep. as 2 vols.: Le Château Noir (The Black Castle) and Les Étranges Noces de Rouletabille (The Strange Wedding of Rouletabille), Lafitte, 1916)
5. Rouletabille chez Krupp (Rouletabille at Krupp's) (serial. in Je sais tout, 1917; rep. Lafitte, 1920) (translated by Brian Stableford as Rouletasbille at Krupp's (2013), ISBN 978-1-61227-144-6)
6. Le Crime de Rouletabille (The Crime of Rouletabille) (serial. in Je Sais Tout, 1921; rep. Lafitte, 1923)
7. Rouletabille chez les Bohémiens (Rouletabille and the Gypsies) (serial. in Le Matin, 1922; rev. Lafitte, 1923)

Authorized Sequels by Noré Brunel:

1. Rouletabille contre la Dame de Pique (Rouletabille v. The Queen of Spades) (serial. in Le Soir, 1947)
2. Rouletabille Joue et Gagne (Rouletabille Plays and Wins) (serial. in Le Soir, 1947)

== Films ==
- The Mystery of the Yellow Room (France, 1913, dir. Maurice Tourneur and Émile Chautard, 905 meters), with Marcel Simon (Rouletabille).
- Le Parfum de la dame en noir (France, 1914, dir. Maurice Tourneur and Émile Chautard, 1220 meters), with Marcel Simon (Rouletabille).
- The Mystery of the Yellow Room (USA, 1919, dir. Émile Chautard, 1900 meters), with Lorin Raker (Rouletabille).
- Rouletabille chez les bohémiens (France, 1922, dir. Henri Fescourt, serial with ten episodes), with Gabriel de Gravone (Rouletabille).
- Le Mystère de la chambre jaune (France, 1930, dir. Marcel L'Herbier, 108 min.), with Roland Toutain (Rouletabille).
- Le Parfum de la dame en noir (France, 1931, dir. Marcel L'Herbier, 109 min.), with Roland Toutain (Rouletabille).
- Rouletabille aviateur (France, 1932, dir. Steve Sekely, 100 min.), with Roland Toutain (Rouletabille).
  - Flying Gold (Hungary, 1932, dir. Steve Sekely, 74 min.): alternative Hungarian-language version of Rouletabille aviateur.
- El misterio del cuarto amarillo (Argentina, 1947, dir. Julio Saraceni, 82 min.), with Santiago Gómez Cou (Rouletabille).
- Rouletabille joue et gagne (France, 1947, dir. Christian Chamborant, 95 min.), with Jean Piat (Rouletabille).
- Rouletabille contre la dame de pique (France, 1948, dir. Christian Chamborant, 88 min.), with Jean Piat (Rouletabille).
- The Mystery of the Yellow Room (France, 1949, dir. Henri Aisner, 90 min.), with Serge Reggiani (Rouletabille).
- Le Parfum de la dame en noir (France, 1949, dir. Louis Daquin, 109 min.), with Serge Reggiani (Rouletabille).
- The Mystery of the Yellow Room (France, 2003, dir. Bruno Podalydès, 118 min.), with Denis Podalydès (Rouletabille).
- Le Parfum de la dame en noir (France, 2005, dir. Bruno Podalydès, 115 min.), with Denis Podalydès (Rouletabille).

== Television ==
- Le Mystère de la Chambre Jaune (ORTF 1, 90 min., November 27, 1965) with Claude Brasseur (Rouletabille).
- Le Parfum de la Dame en Noir (ORTF 1, ten 15-min. episodes, March 3–14, 1966) with Philippe Ogouz (Rouletabille).
- Rouletabille chez le Tsar (ORTF 1, ten 15-min. episodes, March 17–30, 1966) with Philippe Ogouz (Rouletabille).
- Rouletabille chez les Bohémiens (ORTF 1, ten 15-min. episodes, March 31 – April 13, 1966) with Philippe Ogouz (Rouletabille).

== Comics ==
- Rouletabille (32 issues, Éditions Aventures & Voyages/Mon Journal, 1965–67) After a fairly faithful adaptation of the original novels in the early issues, Rouletabille was suddenly transplanted to the 1960s, where he fought enemy spies, etc. With No. 12, Rouletabille merged with its sister magazine Rocambole and became Rocambole et Rouletabille. However, the two characters never met.
- Rouletabille, later changed name Marc Jourdan, written by Claude Moliterni and drawn by Eugenio Sicomoro, the first three published by Dargaud:
  1. Le Crâne de Cristal (1985)
  2. La Momie Écarlate (1987)
  3. Le Singe d'Or (1989)
  4. Sida Connection (Bagheera, 1993)
- Rouletabille written by André-Paul Duchateau, drawn by Bernard C. Swysen, published by Claude Lefrancq. This series Rouletabille was crossovered with other Leroux's famous works, so sometimes he would merged other characters like Raoul de Chagny and Dick Montgomery. On the other hand, his girlfriend (then-wife) Christine Daaé is merged with Ivana Vilitchkov and Maria-Teresa de la Torre:
  1. Le Fantôme de l'Opéra (Rouletabille meets The Phantom of the Opera) (1989)
  2. Le Mystère de la Chambre Jaune (1990)
  3. Le Parfum de la Dame en Noir (1991)
  4. La Poupée Sanglante (1992)
  5. La Machine à Assassiner (1993)
  6. L'Épouse du Soleil (1994)
  7. Le Trésor du Fantôme de l'Opéra (an original story by Duchateau) (1996)
  8. La double vie de Théophraste Longuet (1997)
- Une aventure de Rouletabille written by Jean-Charles Gaudin, published by Soleil:
  1. Le Mystère de la chambre jaune (2018), drawn by Sibin Slavkovic
  2. Le Parfum de la femme en noir (2018), drawn by Christophe Picaud
  3. Le Fantôme de l'Opéra (2019), drawn by Christophe Picaud (this time Rouletabille interviewed with The Persian only)

== Radio ==
The Mystery of the Yellow Room was adapted, fairly faithfully, for BBC Radio Four in 1998 starring Nicholas Boulton as Rouletabille and Geoffrey Whitehead as Inspector Larson, with a far looser adaptation of The Perfume of the Woman in Black following around a year later.
