= Malka Ribowska =

Polish-born French actress (1931–2020)

- Born: 20 May 1931; Warsaw, Second Polish Republic
- Died: 5 September 2020 (aged 89)
- Occupation: Actress

Malka Ribowska (20 May 1931 – 5 September 2020) was a Polish-born French actress.

== Biography ==
Ribowska began her cinematic career in the 1950s. However, her husband, René Allio, helped put her in the spotlight in the 1965 film The Shameless Old Lady and the 1967 film L'Une et l'Autre. In the 1970s, she appeared on television dramas such as Le Sagouin and Mourning Becomes Electra.

Malka Ribowska died on 5 September 2020 at the age of 89.

== Filmography ==
=== Cinema ===
- Une histoire d'amour (1951)
- Vers l'extase (1960)
- The Three Musketeers (1961)
- La Meule (1962)
- Sundays and Cybele (1962)
- Salad by the Roots (1964)
- The Shameless Old Lady (1965)
- Marvelous Angelique (1965)
- The Second Twin (1966)
- L'Une et l'Autre (1967)
- Two Men in Town (1973)
- L'affiche rouge (1976)
- Le Passion de Bernadette (1989)
- Transit (1991)
- Mange ta soupe (1997)

=== Television ===
- Les Cinq Dernières Minutes (1961)
- Tout spliques étaient les Borogoves (1970)
- Le Sagouin (1972)
- Mourning Becomes Electra (1975)
- Chéri-Bibi (1974)
- Splendeurs et misères des courtisanes (1975)
- Le naufrage de Monte-Cristo (1977)
- Sam et Sally (1978)
- La femme rompue (1978)
- L'Homme de la nuit (1983)
- Madame S.O.S. (1984)
- Châteauvallon (1985)
- Navarro (1995)
