= Château de Villemolin =

Castle in Bourgogne-Franche-Comté, France

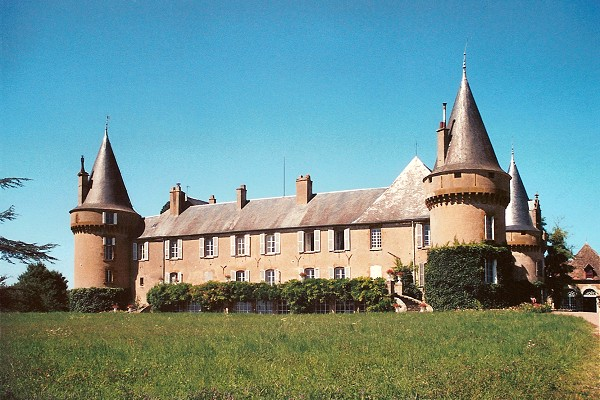

- Location within France

General information
- Coordinates: 47°17′14″N 3°43′11″E

The Château de Villemolin is a castle converted into a stately home in the commune of Anthien in the Nièvre département of France.

It is located in the Morvan massif but not within the Parc naturel régional du Morvan. It is, nevertheless, sited less than 2 km away on a hill facing it.

== Architecture ==
The castle was built in the 14th century on the site of a Gallo-Roman villa, the Villa Molini, and remodelled and modernised in the 17th and 19th centuries in the shape of a horseshoe. It is flanked by three towers and surrounded by significant outbuildings from the 15th, 17th and 19th centuries.

In the neo-Gothic chapel (constructed 1830 and remodelled under the Second Empire) is a 15th-century Pietà painted on wood, a gift from the Carthusians of Val-Saint-Georges.

== Ownership ==
Throughout its documented history (since the first half of the 15th century), the building has always been passed down by inheritance and has never been sold.

Property of the La Corcelle family (15th century), the castle and lands of Villemolin have passed successively by marriage to the Champignolle and de Bascoing families.

The marriage in 1538 of Barbe de Bascoing, heir of Villemolin, to Etienne de Certaines, brought Villemolin into the heritage of the Certaines (known in Nivernais since 1296 and holding fiefs, among others, near Cervon) who still occupy it.

The Château de Villemolin is privately owned with public access. On 16 June 1978, the French Ministry of Culture added the chapel to the inventory of monuments historiques. The castle itself, the outbuildings and the remainder of the site were added on 9 April 2002.

== Cinema ==
In 2002, the château and its site were used in the films The Mystery of the Yellow Room and Le Parfum de la dame en noir directed by Bruno Podalydès.

== See also ==
- List of castles in France
