= Ksenia Kuprina =

- Kissa Kouprine in 1937
- Born: Ксения Александровна Куприна; 21 April 1908; Gatchina, Saint Petersburg Governorate, Imperial Russia
- Died: 8 December 1981 (aged 73); Moscow, USSR
- Occupations: actress, model, translator, memoirist

Ksenia Alexandrovna Kuprina (Russian: Ксе́ния Алекса́ндровна Куприна́, 21 April 1908 – 8 December 1981) was a French model and actress of Russian and Hungarian origins. A daughter of the Russian writer Alexander Kuprin, she was known in France by her stage name Kissa Kouprine.

== Biography ==
Ksenia Kuprina was born in 1908, to Alexander Kuprin and his second wife Elizaveta Geinrich (1882–1942), a daughter of the Hungarian revolutionary Morits Rotoni-Geinrich. At age ten she left Soviet Russia with her parents to settle in Paris. In the mid-1920s she worked for a Paul Poiret agency, then embarked upon the career in films. Kissa Kouprine, as by then she has been known, appeared in eleven films, starting with Le Diable au cœur (1927, with Betty Balfour) by Marcel L'Herbier. It was followed by Herbier's adaptations of Gaston Leroux's Le Mystère de la chambre jaune (1930) and Le Parfum de la dame en noir (1931), as well as L'Aventurier (1934) and La Route impériale (1935). She appeared in three films by Jacques de Casembroot and, finally, Jacques Deval's comedy Women's Club (1936), with Danielle Darrieux, which proved to be her final appearance on screen in France. By this time Kouprine was rich enough to settle at Champs-Élysées. In the 1930s she was romantically involved with Jean Marais, and became friends with the yet unknown singer, Edith Piaf, on whom she would later write a book in Russian.

In 1958 Kuprina returned to the USSR where she worked as stage actress, scriptwriter, translator and later memoirist, who had massive success with her book Kuprin Is My Father (Куприн - мой отец, 1971). Two films about Ksenia Kuprina came out in the USSR: There Is No Life for Me Without Russia (Мне нельзя без России, directed by Alexander Proshkin) and Ksenia Kuprina Speaks (Ксения Куприна рассказывает, Y.Reshetnikova and O. Dosik). For all that, Ksenia Kuprina's life in Russia was marred by disappointments and humiliations. She did not receive a dime from all the re-issues of her famous father's books, was refused an audience by the Khrushchev government's Minister of Culture Ekaterina Furtseva, never got a decent part at the Moscow Pushkin Drama Theatre ("Here I am anonymous actress," she once remarked) and for many years had to rely on her 100-ruble pension, according to the biographer Vladimir Obolensky.

Ksenia Kuprina's main concern in her later years was the Alexander Kuprin Museum in Narovchat that she had been instrumental in creating. She died in 1981 of brain tumor and was interred in Volkovskoye Cemetery in Saint Petersburg.

== Selected filmography ==
- Little Devil May Care (1928)
- The Mystery of the Yellow Room (1930)
- The Perfume of the Lady in Black (1931)
- The Last Night (1934)
- The Adventurer (1934)
