= Chéri-Bibi (1938 film) =

1938 film

- Directed by: Léon Mathot
- Written by: Jacques Constant
- Based on: Chéri-Bibi by Gaston Leroux
- Produced by: Charles Bauche
- Starring: Pierre Fresnay; Jean-Pierre Aumont; Marcel Dalio
- Cinematography: René Gaveau; André Thomas
- Edited by: Marguerite Beaugé
- Music by: Paul Misraki
- Production company: Productions Charles Bauche
- Distributed by: Compagnie Française Cinématographique
- Release date: 2 March 1938
- Running time: 110 minutes
- Country: France
- Language: French

Chéri-Bibi is a 1938 French drama film directed by Léon Mathot and starring Pierre Fresnay, Jean-Pierre Aumont and Marcel Dalio. It was based on the Chéri-Bibi series of novels by Gaston Leroux. The film's sets were designed by the art director Robert Gys. The character had previously appeared in the 1931 American film The Phantom of Paris and would return in a 1955 French film Chéri-Bibi and a 1974 television series of the same title.

== Synopsis ==
Chéri-Bibi is sentenced to serve time in penal colony in South America, but plots a mutiny and an escape with his fellow prisoners.

== Cast ==
- Pierre Fresnay as Francis dit Chéri-Bibi
- Jean-Pierre Aumont as Raoul Palas
- Marcel Dalio as Le donneur
- Suzet Maïs as Ginette
- Thomy Bourdelle as Fric-Frac
- Lucien Dalsace as Le vieux Georges
- René Navarre as Monsieur Charles
- Georges Péclet as Duroc
- Colette Darfeuil as Viviane
- Raymond Aimos as La Ficelle
- Georges Fels as Théo
- Maurice Humbert as Le sourd-muet
- Victor Vina as Coranti
- Liliane Lesaffre as Mademoiselle Roger
- Robert Ozanne as Le Lorrain
- Jean Marconi as Freddy
- Adolf E. Licho as Boris
- Max Doria as Émile
- Alex Potino as Blanchette
- Gérard Landry as Gérard

== Bibliography ==
- Bessy, Maurice & Chirat, Raymond. Histoire du cinéma français: encyclopédie des films, Volume 2. Pygmalion, 1986.
- Crisp, Colin. Genre, Myth and Convention in the French Cinema, 1929-1939. Indiana University Press, 2002.
- Rège, Philippe. Encyclopedia of French Film Directors, Volume 1. Scarecrow Press, 2009.
