= Sylvie (actress) =

French actress (1883–1970)

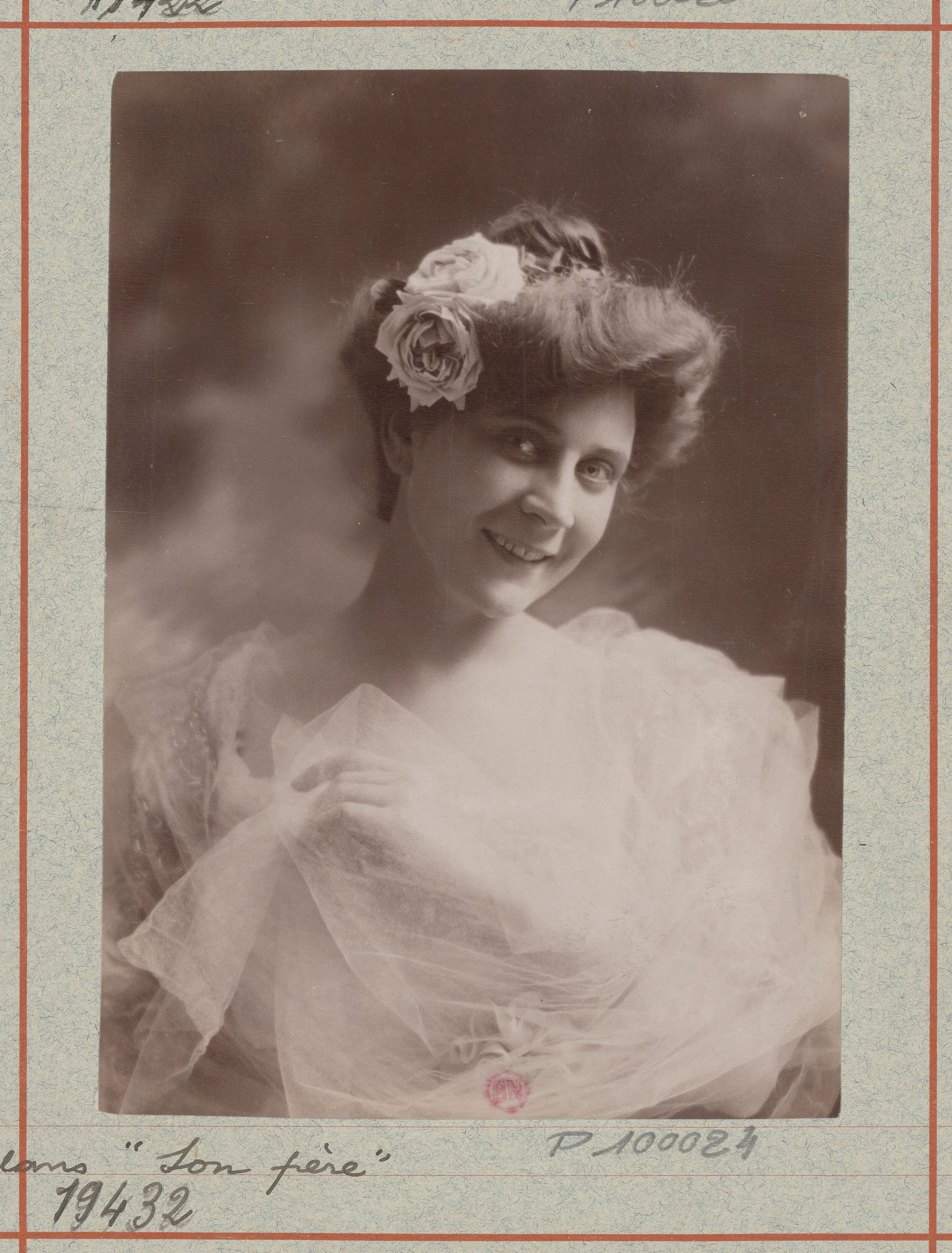
- Sylvie in 1907
- Born: Louise Pauline Mainguené; 3 January 1883; Paris, France
- Died: 5 January 1970 (aged 87); Compiègne, France
- Citizenship: French

Louise Pauline Mainguené, known as Sylvie (3 January 1883 – 5 January 1970), was a French actress.

The daughter of a sailor and a teacher, Sylvie entered an acting conservatory where she won a class comedy award unanimously. She started her professional career in 1903 and she earned her first success with Old Heidelberg. She first appeared in French silent films. She was an actress known for The Little World of Don Camillo (1952), The Shameless Old Lady (1965), and Le Corbeau (1943).

She won the first National Society of Film Critics Award for Best Actress in 1966 for her performance in The Shameless Old Lady.

== Partial filmography ==
- Germinal (1913) - Catherine
- Le coupable (1917) - Louise Rameau
- Roger la Honte (1922) - Henriette Laroque
- Crime and Punishment (1935) - Catherine Ivanova
- Life Dances On (1937) - La maîtresse de Thierry
- The Lafarge Case (1938) - Adélaîde Lafarge
- The Curtain Rises (1938) - Clémence
- The White Slave (1939) - Safète - la mère de Vedad
- The End of the Day (1939) - Madame Tusini
- La Comédie du bonheur (1940) - Madame Marie
- Ecco la felicità (1940) - Signora Marie
- Romance of Paris (1941) - Madame Gauthier
- Montmartre (1941) - Madame Courtin
- The Man Without a Name (1943) - Madame Ourdebey
- Marie-Martine (1943) - La mère de Maurice
- Angels of Sin (1943) - La prieure
- Le Corbeau (1943) - La mère du cancéreux
- Traveling Light (1944) - Madame Renaud
- The Island of Love (1944) - La voyante
- Father Goriot (1945) - Mademoiselle Michonneau
- Manon, a 326 (1945)
- Le pays sans étoiles (1946) - Madame Nogret
- The Idiot (1946) - Madame Ivolvine
- That's Not the Way to Die (1946) - Suzanne Bouvier
- Passionnelle (1947) - La baronne de Marsannes
- Mirror (1947) - La religieuse
- Coincidences (1947) - Amélie
- La révoltée (1948) - Mademoiselle Barge
- Two Loves (1949) - Mme Vincent
- Tous les deux (1949) - Mme Gendron
- White Paws (1949) - La mère de Maurice
- God Needs Men (1950) - Coise Karbacen
- Under the Sky of Paris (1951) - Mademoiselle Perrier
- Little World of Don Camillo (1952) - Signora Cristina
- We Are All Murderers (1952) - Laetitia Bollini
- Forbidden Fruit (1952) - Madame Pellegrin mère
- Thérèse Raquin (1953) - Madame Raquin
- A Slice of Life (1954) - Zelinda (segment "Casa d'altri")
- Ulysses (1954) - Eurycleia
- Black Dossier (1955) - Mme. Baju
- Michel Strogoff (1956) - Marfa, mère de Strogoff
- Les Truands (1957) - Clarisse Benoit
- Le Miroir à deux faces (1958) - Mme Tardivet
- Quai du Point-du-Jour (1960) - Madame Dupont
- Croesus (1960) - Delphine
- Family Diary (1962) - Grandmother
- Nutty, Naughty Chateau (1963) - La grand-mère / Grandmother
- The Shameless Old Lady (1965) - Madame Berthe Bertini
- Black Humor (1965) - La mère Belhomme - segment 1 'La Bestiole"
