= Anthien =

- Commune
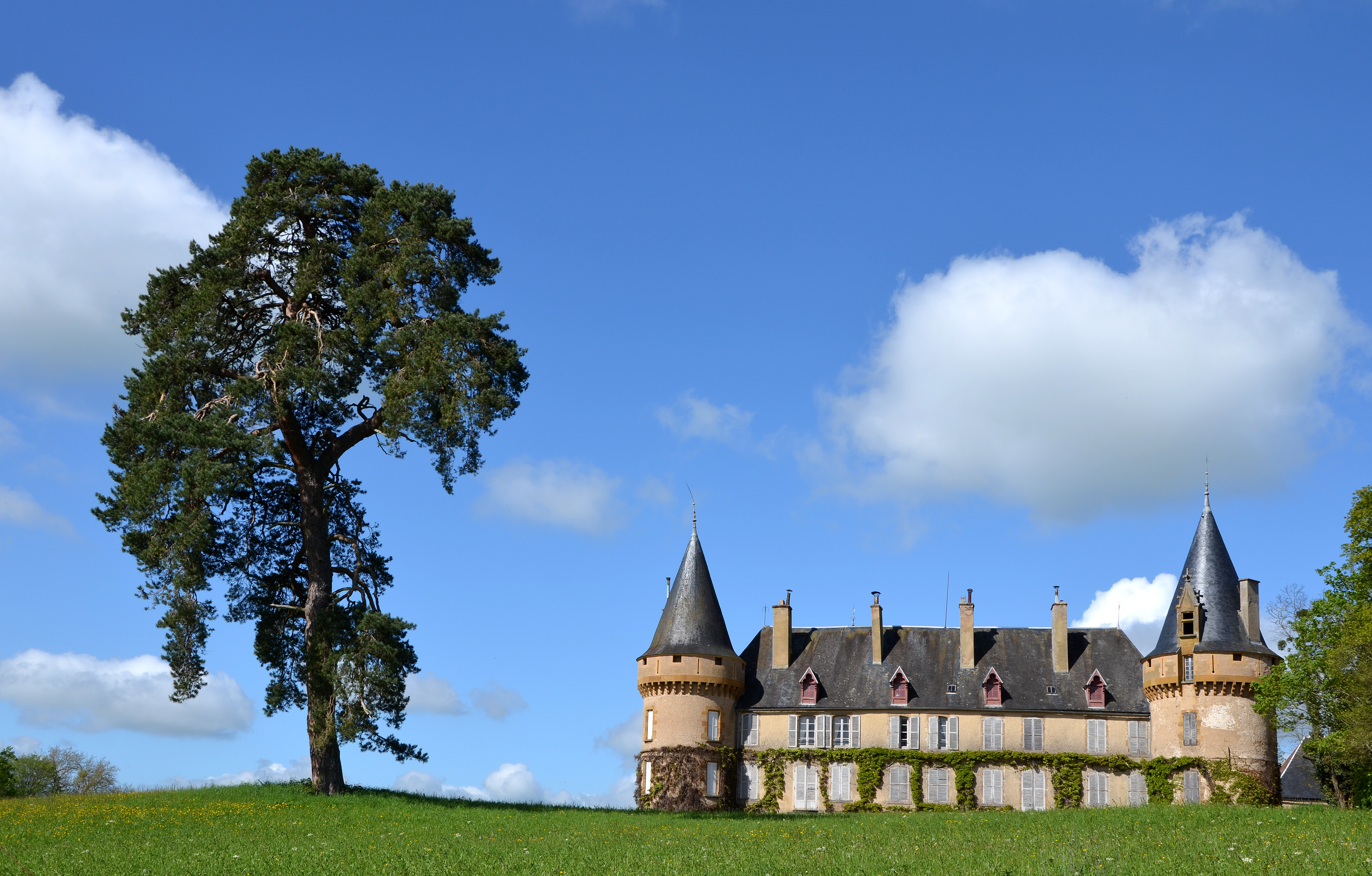
- The Chateau de Villemolin, in Anthien

- Coat of arms
- Location of Anthien
- Location within France Location within Bourgogne-Franche-Comté
- Coordinates: 47°18′47″N 3°44′25″E
- Country: France
- Region: Bourgogne-Franche-Comté
- Department: Nièvre
- Arrondissement: Clamecy
- Canton: Corbigny
- Intercommunality: Tannay-Brinon-Corbigny

Government
  - Mayor (2020–2026): Sandrine Gaillard
- Area^{1}: 19.68 km^{2} (7.60 sq mi)
- Highest elevation: 372 m (1,220 ft)
- Lowest elevation: 182 m (597 ft)
- Population (2023): 173
  - Density: 8.79/km^{2} (22.8/sq mi)
- Time zone: UTC+01:00 (CET)
  - Summer (DST): UTC+02:00 (CEST)
- INSEE/Postal code: 58008 /58800
- ^{1} French Land Register data, which excludes lakes, ponds, glaciers > 1 km^{2} (0.386 sq mi or 247 acres) and river estuaries.

Anthien (French pronunciation: [ɑ̃tjɛ̃]) is a commune in the Nièvre département in central France.

== Population ==
Historical population
| Year | Pop. | ±% p.a. |
|---|---|---|
| 1968 | 260 | — |
| 1975 | 252 | −0.45% |
| 1982 | 232 | −1.17% |
| 1990 | 211 | −1.18% |
| 1999 | 168 | −2.50% |
| 2007 | 177 | +0.65% |
| 2012 | 173 | −0.46% |
| 2017 | 177 | +0.46% |
| 2023 | 173 | −0.38% |
Source: INSEE

== Sights ==
The Château de Villemolin (15th, 17th and 19th centuries) was a location for the film 2003 The Mystery of the Yellow Room directed by Bruno Podalydès.

== See also ==
- Communes of the Nièvre department
