= Adolphe Osso =

French film producer (1894–1961)

- Born: 8 September 1894; Safed, Palestine, Ottoman Empire
- Died: 15 September 1961 (aged 67); Paris, France
- Occupation: Producer
- Years active: 1920–1961 (film)

Adolphe Osso (1894–1961) was a French film producer. During the 1920s he was the head of the French branch of Paramount Pictures. Later he founded his own production company Les Films Osso.

== Selected filmography ==
- The Secret of Rosette Lambert (1920)
- The Mystery of the Yellow Room (1930)
- The Eaglet (1931)
- I'll Be Alone After Midnight (1931)
- The Unknown Singer (1931)
- The Perfume of the Lady in Black (1931)
- A Son from America (1932)
- Rouletabille the Aviator (1932)
- Sailor's Song (1932)
- Should We Wed Them? (1932)
- The Last Blow (1932)
- Spring Shower (1932)
- Charley's Aunt (1936)
- In the Service of the Tsar (1936)
- The Forsaken (1937)
- Rail Pirates (1938)
- Macao (1942)
- Goodbye Darling (1946)
- Rue des Saussaies (1951)
- Village Feud (1951)
- The House on the Dune (1952)
- The Knight of the Night (1953)
- Queen Margot (1954)
- The She-Wolves (1957)
- Checkerboard (1959)
- Captain Fracasse (1961)

== Bibliography ==
- Phillips, Alastair. City of Darkness, City of Light: Émigré Filmmakers in Paris, 1929-1939. Amsterdam University Press, 2004.
