= Pierre Decazes =

French actor (1932–2020)

- Born: Pierre Aderhold; 12 July 1932; Le Blanc-Mesnil
- Died: 11 August 2020 (aged 88); Salviac
- Occupation: Actor

Pierre Decazes, stage name of Pierre Aderhold (12 July 1932 – 11 August 2020) was a French actor.

== Biography ==
Pierre Aderhold gave himself the name "Decazes" for Decazeville, where he spent his childhood. Coming from a family of blue collar workers, Decazes lived in Paris and Lot. His brother, Gérard Aderhold, led the Poissonnerie Aderhold in Rodez and founded the Belondine oyster company within the Groupe Flo. Decazes was the father of two children. His son is writer Carl Aderhold.

== Partial filmography ==
- La Meule (1962)
- La Foire aux cancres (1963)
- L'Âge ingrat (1964) - Le cycliste (uncredited)
- Les Cinq Dernières Minutes (19864-1988, TV Series) - M. Henri / Le premier brigadier
- The Shameless Old Lady (1965) - Charlote
- The War Is Over (1966) - L'employé SNCF / Station Employee
- The Confession (1970)
- Elise, or Real Life (1970)
- Atlantic Wall (1970) - Soldat S.S. #1
- There's No Smoke Without Fire (1973)
- Les Mohicans de Paris (1973–1975, TV Series) - Justin
- Lacombe, Lucien (1974) - Aubert
- Les Fargeot (1974, TV Series) - L'épicier
- Gross Paris (1974)
- Mort de Raymond Roussel (1975, Short)
- Calmos (1976)
- Nouvelles d'Henry James (1976, TV Series) - L'officier
- La situation est grave mais... pas désespérée (1976)
- The Wing or the Thigh (1976) - Le patron de l'hôtel
- Ben et Bénédict (1977) - Le maire
- Petit déjeuner compris (1980, TV Mini-Series) - Le 1er candidat
- Sacrés gendarmes (1980) - Le père belge
- Les Enquêtes du commissaire Maigret (1983–1989, TV Series) - Le chef de gare / Yves Le Guerec
- The Satin Slipper (1985) - Don Léopol August
- Châteauvallon (1985, TV Series)
- Bleu comme l'enfer (1986)
- Bernadette (1988) - Le e préfet Massy
- I Want to Go Home (1989) - Le garagiste

== Theatre ==
- The Birds (1960)
- The Good Person of Szechwan (1960)
- Le Vicaire (1963)
- La Danse du Sergent Musgrave (1963)
- The Dragon (1965)
- The Condemned of Altona (1965)
- The Mother (1968)
- La Cage aux Folles (1973)
- La Cage aux Folles (1978)
- Retour à Eden Platz (1991)
- C33 (1995)
