= The Last Night (1934 film) =

1934 film

- Directed by: Jacques de Casembroot
- Written by: Jean-Henri Blanchon; Jean-Louis Le Marois
- Starring: Florelle; José Noguéro; Kissa Kouprine
- Cinematography: Ganzli Walter
- Music by: Marguerite Monnot
- Production company: Compagnie Niçoise Cinématographique
- Distributed by: Filma
- Release date: 4 May 1934
- Running time: 85 minutes
- Country: France
- Language: French

The Last Night (French: La dernière nuit) is a 1934 French comedy film directed by Jacques de Casembroot and starring Florelle, José Noguéro and Kissa Kouprine.

== Cast ==
- Florelle as Evelyne Ebert
- José Noguéro as Paul Gérard
- Kissa Kouprine as Mimosa
- Jim Gérald as Mathias Krug
- Georges Péclet as Bob
- Marc-Hély as Ernest
- Georges Térof
- Peggy Vère
- Windrow
- Frédéric Mariotti

== Bibliography ==
- Rège, Philippe . Encyclopedia of French Film Directors, Volume 1. Scarecrow Press, 2009.
