= Rouletabille at Krupp's =

1917 novel by Gaston Leroux

- Author: Gaston Leroux
- Language: French
- Genre: Thriller
- Publication date: 1917
- Publication place: France
- Media type: Print
- Preceded by: Rouletabille at War
- Followed by: The Crime of Rouletabille

Rouletabille at Krupp's (French: Rouletabille chez Krupp) is a 1917 French thriller novel by the French writer Gaston Leroux. It is the fifth in his series of novels featuring the fictional detective Joseph Rouletabille.

== Synopsis ==
During the First World War, Rouletabille is sent behind enemy lines to investigate the whereabouts of a French scientist who has been kidnapped and forced to work on a new super weapon for the German Empire at the Krupp armaments factory.

== Bibliography ==
- Andrea Goulet. Legacies of the Rue Morgue: Science, Space, and Crime Fiction in France. University of Pennsylvania Press, 2016.
