= The Shameless Old Lady =

- Directed by: René Allio
- Written by: René Allio; Bertolt Brecht
- Produced by: Claude Nedjar
- Starring: Sylvie; Victor Lanoux
- Cinematography: Denys Clerval
- Edited by: Sophie Coussein
- Release date: 24 March 1965
- Running time: 94 minutes
- Country: France
- Language: French

The Shameless Old Lady (Original title: La Vieille dame indigne) is a 1965 French film. Based on the 1939 short story de:Die unwürdige Greisin by Bertolt Brecht, it was directed by René Allio who also wrote the screenplay, and stars Sylvie and Victor Lanoux. Sylvie won the National Society of Film Critics Award for Best Actress for this role, one of her latter roles and her only lead.

== Plot ==
Madame Berthe, a newly widowed 70-year-old miser, has lived a sheltered life married to her husband for some 60 years. She determines to venture into the modern world and have as much fun as possible, and in doing so, finds that she loves it. She blows her life savings, much to the disapproval of the young people around her.

== Cast ==
- Sylvie - Madame Berthe
- Victor Lanoux - Pierre
- Malka Ribowska - Rosalie
- François Maistre - Gaston
- Étienne Bierry - Albert
- Pascale de Boysson - Simone
- Jean-Louis Lamande - Charles
- Lena Delanne - Victoire
- Jeanne Hardeyn - Rose
- Robert Bousquet - Robert
- Jean Bouise - Alphonse
- André Jourdan - Lucien
- Pierre Decazes - Charlot
- André Thorent - Dufour
