= Chéri-Bibi (TV series) =

Television series

- Genre: Mystery crime
- Based on: Chéri-Bibi by Gaston Leroux
- Written by: Jean Pignol
- Directed by: Jean Pignol
- Starring: Hervé Sand; Jean Lefebvre; Danièle Lebrun
- Composer: Francis Lemarque
- Country of origin: France
- Original language: French
- No. of series: 1
- No. of episodes: 46

Production
- Running time: 13 minutes
- Production company: Office de Radiodiffusion Télévision Française

Original release
- Network: ORTF 1
- Release: 20 December 1974 – 18 February 1975

Chéri-Bibi is a French mystery crime television series which premiered on the ORTF 1 channel between 20 December 1974 and 18 February 1975. The programme was based on the series of four serial novels by Gaston Leroux. Previous adaptations of the stories include The Phantom of Paris (1931), Chéri-Bibi (1938) and Chéri-Bibi (1955).

== Synopsis ==
Chéri-Bibi is wrongly sentenced for a crime he did not commit and sent to serve in a penal colony in French Guiana. He leads a mutiny amongst his fellow prisoners and seizes the ship carrying there. He changes place with the dead Marquis du Touchais and travels back to France and assumes his identity. He lives a happy life with Cécily, the neglected with of the Marquis, until discovering that it was the Marquis who really committed the crime he was tried for and the police are now on his case.

== Cast ==
- Hervé Sand as Chéri-Bibi
- Jean Lefebvre as La ficelle
- Danièle Lebrun as Cécily
- Daniel Emilfork as Le Kanak
- Marguerite Cassan as Soeur Sainte-Marie des Anges
- Pierre Hatet as Pont Marie
- Malka Ribowska as La Comtesse
- Robert Vattier as Le commandant
- Andrée Damant as Mme Regime
- Georges Montillier as Maître Regime
- Jean Saudray as Petit Bon Dieu
- Marcel Champel as Gueule de Bois
- Jean Mauvais as Le Rouquin
- Georges Hubert as Le Coryphée
- Muse Dalbray as Reine
- Pierre Filou as Le domestique
- Jean De Beaumont as L'inspecteur
- Antoine Marin as Baron Proscoff

== Bibliography ==
- Jélot-Blanc, Jean-Jacques.Télé feuilletons. Editions Ramsay, 1993.
- Soister, John T. & Nicolella, Henry. Down from the Attic: Rare Thrillers of the Silent Era through the 1950s. McFarland, 2016.
