= The Man Without a Name (1943 film) =

1943 film

- Directed by: Léon Mathot
- Written by: Jean-Georges Auriol; Maurice Bessy; Jean-Pierre Vinet
- Produced by: Jean-Pierre Frogerais
- Starring: Jean Galland; André Alerme; Sylvie
- Cinematography: Georges Million
- Edited by: Aleksandr Uralsky
- Music by: Henri Verdun
- Production company: Productions Sigma
- Distributed by: Les Films Vog
- Release date: 4 February 1943
- Running time: 98 minutes
- Country: France
- Language: French

The Man Without a Name (French: L'homme sans nom) is a 1943 French drama film directed by Léon Mathot and starring Jean Galland, André Alerme and Sylvie. The film's sets were designed by the art director Roland Quignon. It premiered in Paris, then under German Occupation.

== Synopsis ==
Following an operation gone wrong, a famous Paris surgeon abandons his job and goes to live in a small Basque village. Called back to save the life of a young holidaymaker, he rediscovers his former talents.

== Cast ==
- Jean Galland as Vincent Berteaux dit Monsieur Vincent
- André Alerme as Le docteur Pagès
- Sylvie as Madame Ourdebey
- Anne Laurens as La soeur de lait d'André
- Georges Rollin as André Ourdebey
- Gilberte Joney as Assomption
- Tichadel as L'innocent
- Marie Carlot as La maîtresse
- Danielle Godet as Une figurante
- Gisèle Grandpré as La mère d'Assomption

== Bibliography ==
- Bertin-Maghit, Jean Pierre. Le cinéma français sous Vichy: les films français de 1940 à 1944. Revue du Cinéma Albatros, 1980.
