= Georges Montillier =

French actor (1939–2022)

- Born: 1939; Roanne, France
- Died: 22 February 2022 (aged 82–83); France
- Education: Conservatoire de Paris
- Occupation: Actor

Georges Montillier (1939 – 22 February 2022) was a French actor.

== Life and career ==
Montillier was born in Roanne in 1939. A former student of the Conservatoire de Paris, he was also a resident of the Comédie-Française. In 1998, he left Paris and founded the Cours d'art Dramatique Myriade in Lyon, which he directed until 2009. Montillier died on 22 February 2022.

== Filmography ==
=== Cinema ===
- CIA contro KGB (1978)
- Certaines nouvelles (1980)
- Un bon petit diable (1983)
- My New Partner (1984)
- Partenaires (1984)
- My Brother-in-Law Killed My Sister (1986)
- Pirates (1986)
- Family Business (1986)
- Blues Cop (1986)
- The Killing Time (1987 film) (1987)
- My New Partner II (1990)

=== Television ===
- Que ferait donc Faber ? (1969)
- Aubrac-City (1971)
- The New Adventures of Vidocq (1973)
- Chéri-Bibi (1975)
- Catherine (1986)
- Le Gerfaut (1987)
- Navarro (1995)
- Le Retour d'Arsène Lupin (1995)
- L'Allée du Roi (1995)

=== Telefilms ===
- Le Veilleur de nuit (1996)
