= The Mystery of the Yellow Room (2003 film) =

- Directed by: Bruno Podalydès
- Starring: Denis Podalydès
- Cinematography: Christophe Beaucarne
- Production companies: Why Not Productions; Les Films du Fleuve; France 2 Cinéma; RTBF Télévision belge
- Release date: 11 June 2003
- Running time: 1h 58min
- Countries: France; Belgium
- Language: French
- Box office: $5,814,320

The Mystery of the Yellow Room (French: Le Mystère de la chambre jaune) is a 2003 French comedy film based on the 1907 novel of the same name by Gaston Leroux.

It was followed by a sequel The Perfume of the Lady in Black in 2005.

== Plot ==
In the 1930's in rural France, Mathilde, daughter of the famous inventor Professor Strangerson, is victim of an attempted murder in the Professor's castle. This assassination attempt took place at midnight as she was alone inside her locked bedroom (The Yellow Room) while the Professor and Father Jacques were in the next room and did not see anyone come in or out. Gunshots are heard from within the bedroom. The Professor, Father Jacques and 2 other employees of the castle managed to enter by kicking the door down. They found Mathilde knocked unconscious on the floor, alone, two bullets lodged in the ceiling and a bloody handprint on the wall.

The reporter Joseph Rouletabille accompagnied by his friend and photographer, Sinclair arrive at the castle, eager to solve the mystery. On the train ride there, they met Judge De Marquet and his aide, sent here to investigate. At the castle they learned that a famous detective, Frederic Larsan, is also present to solve the matter. Working with each other, Rouletabille, De Marquet and Larsan, try to solve the mystery and prevent the attacker from coming back and finishing his undertaking. To do so, all spend the next few days residing in the castle alongside the Professor, his daughter and their entourage. All people present, apart from Mathilde, the Professor and Father Jacques are on list of suspects : Mathilde's fiancé, the concierge and his wife, the groundskeeper. It is also considered that the attacker may be someone from outside the estate's residents.

The investigators learn from the Professor that his daughter called off her wedding just two days prior. Rouletabille also informs Sinclair that something important has happened to Mathilde when she received a coded letter that profoundly upset her and her fiancé the day before.

After witnessing Mathilde spike her father's night tea with sleeping drug, Rouletabille and Larsan deduce that Mathilde will meet with her attacker. That night, Sinclair set up a stakeout outside her bedroom after Larsan and Rouletabille also fell victim to the sleeping drug at dinner. During the night, someone wearing a welding mask sneaks inside Mathilde bedroom. Sinclair manages to wake Rouletabille up and the reporter uses a ladder to spy through Mathilde's window. There he sees Mathilde acting erratically as she begs the attacker to leave her alone just before kissing him passionately. They set up a trap with Larsan, who has since woken up, and Jacques, each watching an exit route the attacker can use but he still manages to vanish mysteriously. Everyone goes back to Mathilde's room when Sinclair spots him again and, aided by the concierge, starts to pursue him only for them to find him dead in the courtyard, stabbed, after he escaped their sight for a brief moment. The attacker is revealed to be the groundskeeper. During this whole ordeal, Mathilde's fiancé was nowhere to be found, only to reappear the next morning. He is arrested by Larsan. Rouletabille informs Sinclair that he will leave for a while to gather evidence as he claims to know the true identity of the attacker, and states the groundskeeper was not the real culprit.

Some weeks later, the whole group comes back to the castle for the reconstitution. There Larsan claims that the Goundskeeper was killed by the real assassin who then fled while everyone was distracted but Rouletabille disagrees. He just comes back from his trip with the evidence but claims he can't reveal the killer's identity before 6.30pm that day. They take an afternoon break until that time.

At 6.30, Rouletabille reveals the killer to be Larsan who is actually an alias of Ballmeyer, a French world-class acrobat thief and proceeds to explain the situation : Larsan, having only pretended to be drugged to sleep, wore a welder's outfit and went to Mathilde's room. During this time, the concierge's wife was having an affair with the Groundskeeper in the next room but Rouletabille having moved the Keeper's ladder to spy through the window, the Keeper could not leave and was forced to hide in the hallway closet. When the attacker (Larsan) was running away from Rouletabille, Sinclair, Jacques and Larsan he threw his outfit in the closed the Keeper was in and both saw each other. Larsan then pretended to have lost sight of the assassin when he was joined by Rouletabille and the others. Later, the Keeper donned the welder outfit and tried to run away but he was spotted and chased by Sinclair who mistook him for the killer. In the courtyard, the Groundskeeper was murdered by Larsan to tie up loose ends. Larsan then climbed back up through a window and pretended to just arrive, using the stairs with everyone else.

Regarding now the case of the 'Yellow Room' attack, Rouletabille explains that the attacker never was in Mathilde's bedroom at midnight. Mathilde was attacked earlier that day and the perceived 'attack' at midnight behind closed doors was merely a nightmare, recalling the earlier attack. The gunshot was fired by mistake during her nightmare, during which she also fell and hit her head on the nightstand, knocking herself out.

It turns out that Ballemeyer/Larsan was Mathilde's husband whom she married in secret back when she was living in America and who had to disappear years ago since the police were looking for him. He later learned about Mathilde's planned new wedding and sent her the coded letter in which he told her he would not let her remarry and would kill her if she did. This was the reason why she did not tell anyone about the first attack and why she knew and wanted to meet the 'attacker'. Larsan also set up a rendez-vous with Mathilde's fiancé that night so that the man would leave and be suspected. Proven innocent by Rouletabille's presentation, he is exonerated and set free by order of Judge De Marquet.

Much to the anger of everyone present, Rouletabille reveals that during the afternoon break, he warned Larsan he was about to out him, giving him a headstart on the police. That evening, Rouletabille and Sinclair take a few pictures of the estate at sunset while discussing the case before leaving.

== Cast ==
- Denis Podalydès - Joseph Rouletabille, crime reporter
- Jean-Noël Brouté - Sainclair, his photographer
- Claude Rich - de Marquet, the judge
- Scali Delpeyrat - Mallet, his clerk
- Sabine Azéma - Mathilde Stangerson
- Michael Lonsdale - Professor Stangerson
- Julos Beaucarne - Old Jacques
- Olivier Gourmet - Robert Darzac
- Pierre Arditi - Inspector Larsan
- Isabelle Candelier - Madame Bernier
- Dominique Parent - Monsieur Bernier
- George Aguilar - Little Foot, the gamekeeper
- Bruno Podalydès - the doctor

== Production ==
Filming took place for three months at the Château de Villemolin in Anthien (Nièvre). Except for one scene that takes place on a train, all scenes in the film were shot inside and on the grounds of the château.
