= National Society of Film Critics Award for Best Actress =

Annual actress award

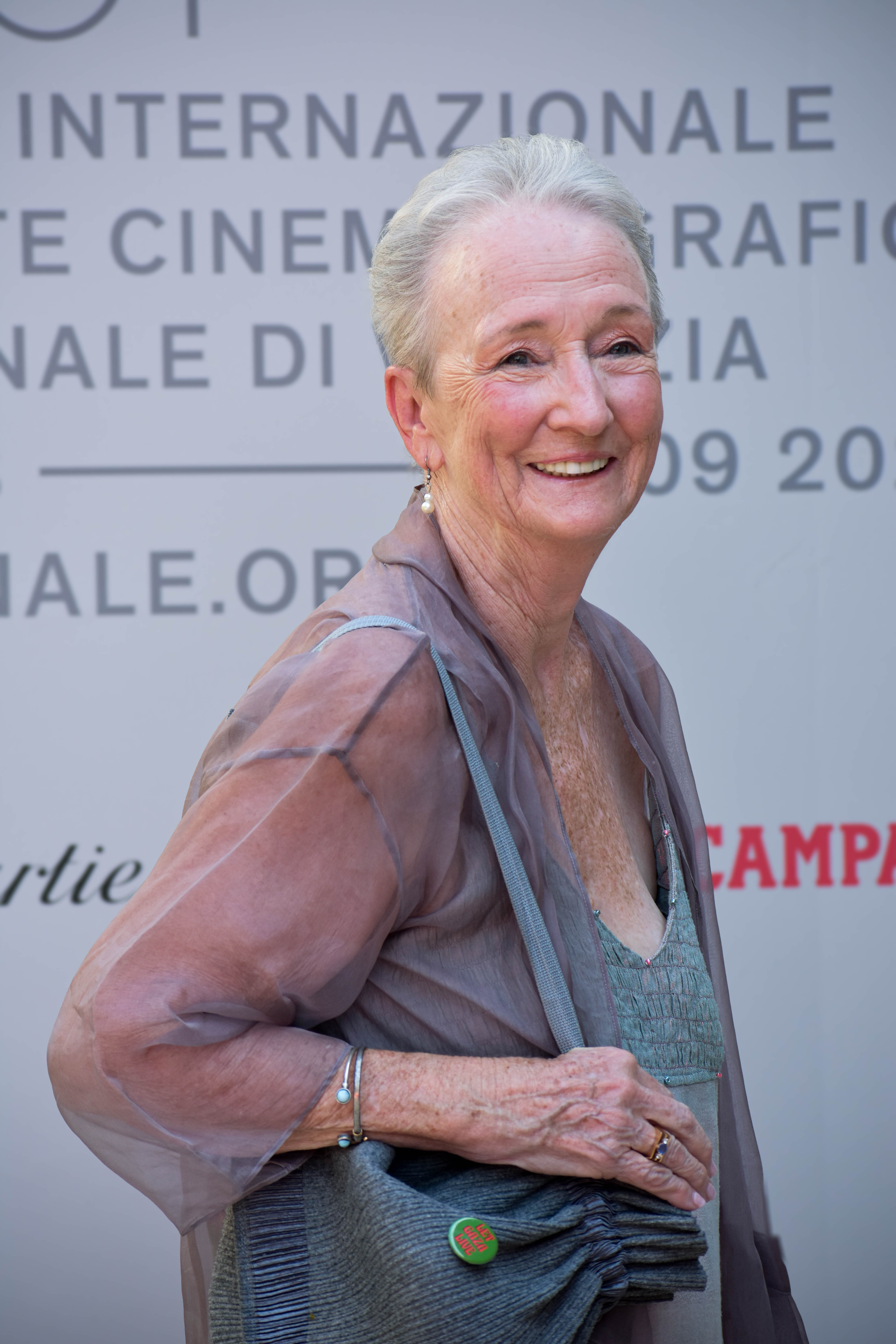
- Current recipient: Kathleen Chalfant
- Awarded for: Best Performance by an Actress in a Leading Role
- Country: United States
- Presented by: National Society of Film Critics
- First award: Sylvie; The Shameless Old Lady (La vieille dame indigne) (1966)
- Currently held by: Kathleen Chalfant; Familiar Touch (2025)
- Website: nationalsocietyoffilmcritics.com

The National Society of Film Critics Award for Best Actress is an annual award given by the National Society of Film Critics to honour the best leading actress of the year.

== Winners ==
=== 1960s ===
Year	Winner	Film	Role
1966	Sylvie	The Shameless Old Lady (La vieille dame indigne)	Madame Bertini
1967	Bibi Andersson	Persona	Alma, The Nurse
1968	Liv Ullmann	Shame (Skammen)	Eva Rosenberg
1969	Vanessa Redgrave	Isadora	Isadora Duncan

=== 1970s ===
Year	Winner	Film	Role
1970	Glenda Jackson	Women in Love	Gudrun Brangwen
1971	Jane Fonda	Klute	Bree Daniels
1972	Cicely Tyson	Sounder	Rebecca Morgan
1973	Liv Ullmann	The New Land (Nybyggarna)	Kristina
1974	Liv Ullmann	Scenes from a Marriage (Scener ur ett äktenskap)	Marianne
1975	Isabelle Adjani	The Story of Adele H. (L'histoire d'Adèle H.)	Adèle Hugo / Adèle Lewry
1976	Sissy Spacek	Carrie	Carrie White
1977	Diane Keaton	Annie Hall	Annie Hall
1978	Ingrid Bergman	Autumn Sonata (Höstsonaten)	Charlotte Andergast
1979	Sally Field	Norma Rae	Norma Rae Webster

=== 1980s ===
Year	Winner	Film	Role
1980	Sissy Spacek	Coal Miner's Daughter	Loretta Lynn
1981	Marília Pêra	Pixote (Pixote: a lei do mais fraco)	Sueli
1982	Meryl Streep	Sophie's Choice	Zofia "Sophie" Zawistowski
1983	Debra Winger	Terms of Endearment	Emma Greenway Horton
1984	Vanessa Redgrave	The Bostonians	Olive Chancellor
1985	Vanessa Redgrave	Wetherby	Jean Travers
1986	Chloe Webb	Sid and Nancy	Nancy Spungen
1987	Emily Lloyd	Wish You Were Here	Lynda Mansell
1988	Judy Davis	High Tide	Lillie
1989	Michelle Pfeiffer	The Fabulous Baker Boys	Susie Diamond

=== 1990s ===
Year	Winner	Film	Role
1990	Anjelica Huston	The Grifters	Lilly Dillon
1990	Anjelica Huston	The Witches	Eva Ernst / Grand High Witch
1991	Alison Steadman	Life Is Sweet	Wendy
1992	Emma Thompson	Howards End	Margaret "Meg" Schlegel
1993	Holly Hunter	The Piano	Ada McGrath
1994	Jennifer Jason Leigh	Mrs. Parker and the Vicious Circle	Dorothy Parker
1995	Elisabeth Shue	Leaving Las Vegas	Sera
1996	Emily Watson	Breaking the Waves	Bess McNeill
1997	Julie Christie	Afterglow	Phyllis Mann
1998	Ally Sheedy	High Art	Lucy Berliner
1999	Reese Witherspoon	Election	Tracy Flick

=== 2000s ===
Year	Winner	Film	Role
2000	Laura Linney	You Can Count on Me	Samantha "Sammy" Prescott
2001	Naomi Watts	Mulholland Drive	Betty Elms / Diane Selwyn
2002	Diane Lane	Unfaithful	Connie Sumner
2003	Charlize Theron	Monster	Aileen Wuornos
2004	Imelda Staunton	Vera Drake	Vera Rose Drake
2004	Hilary Swank	Million Dollar Baby	Maggie Fitzgerald
2005	Reese Witherspoon	Walk the Line	June Carter Cash
2006	Helen Mirren	The Queen	Queen Elizabeth II
2007	Julie Christie	Away from Her	Fiona Anderson
2008	Sally Hawkins	Happy-Go-Lucky	Pauline "Poppy" Cross
2009	Yolande Moreau	Séraphine	Séraphine Louis

=== 2010s ===
Year	Winner	Film	Role
2010	Giovanna Mezzogiorno	Vincere	Ida Dalser
2011	Kirsten Dunst	Melancholia	Justine
2012	Emmanuelle Riva	Amour	Anne Laurent
2013	Cate Blanchett	Blue Jasmine	Jeanette "Jasmine" Francis
2014	Marion Cotillard	The Immigrant	Ewa Cybulska
2014	Marion Cotillard	Two Days, One Night	Sandra Bya
2015	Charlotte Rampling	45 Years	Kate Mercer
2016	Isabelle Huppert	Elle	Michèle Leblanc
2016	Isabelle Huppert	Things to Come	Nathalie Chazeaux
2017	Sally Hawkins	The Shape of Water	Elisa Esposito
2017	Sally Hawkins	Maudie	Maud Lewis
2018	Olivia Colman	The Favourite	Anne, Queen of Great Britain
2019	Mary Kay Place	Diane	Diane

=== 2020s ===
Year	Winner	Film	Role
2020	Frances McDormand	Nomadland	Fern
2021	Penélope Cruz	Parallel Mothers	Janis Martinez
2022	Cate Blanchett	Tár	Lydia Tár
2023	Sandra Hüller	Anatomy of a Fall	Sandra Voyter
2023	Sandra Hüller	The Zone of Interest	Hedwig Höss
2024	Marianne Jean-Baptiste	Hard Truths	Pansy Deacon
2025	Kathleen Chalfant	Familiar Touch	Ruth

== Multiple awards ==
3 wins

- Vanessa Redgrave (1969, 1984, 1985)
- Liv Ullmann (1968, 1973, 1974)

2 wins

- Cate Blanchett (2013, 2022)
- Julie Christie (1997, 2007)
- Sally Hawkins (2008, 2017)
- Sissy Spacek (1976, 1980)
- Reese Witherspoon (1999, 2005)

== See also ==
- National Board of Review Award for Best Actress
- New York Film Critics Circle Award for Best Actress
- Los Angeles Film Critics Association Award for Best Actress
