= Roland Toutain =

French actor, songwriter and stuntman

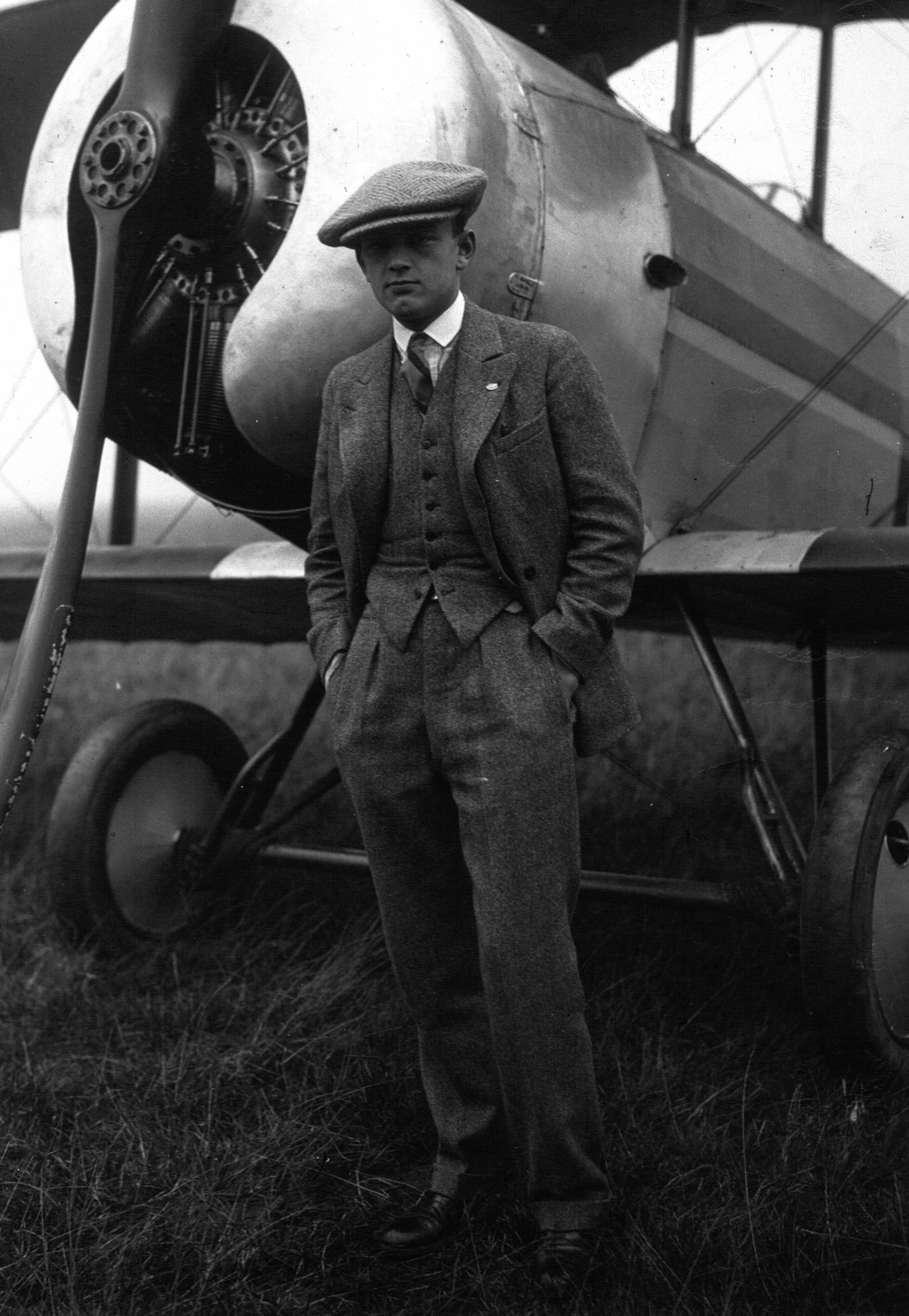
- Born: 15 October 1905; Paris, France
- Died: 16 October 1977 (aged 72); Argenteuil (Val-d'Oise), France
- Occupations: Stuntman, Actor
- Years active: 1923–1957
- Spouse(s): Odette Calais (divorced) (??) (divorced) (??) (divorced)

Roland Toutain (October 18, 1905 - October 16, 1977) was a French actor, songwriter and stuntman. He appeared in 55 films between 1924 and 1957, both in leading and supporting roles.

== Life and career ==
Toutain is known for playing the aviator André Jurieux in Jean Renoir's film The Rules of the Game (La Règle du jeu). The role suited him: Toutain was also an avid hobby aviator, as well as an acrobat. He first gained fame as an actor in the adventure film The Mystery of the Yellow Room and its sequel The Perfume of the Lady in Black. Toutain also appeared in Fritz Lang's Liliom (1934). His film career slowed down in the late 1940s and he made his final movie in 1956. He was a good friend of fellow actor Jean Marais, who organized his funeral.

== Selected filmography ==
- L'Inhumaine (1924)
- The Mystery of the Yellow Room (1930)
- The Perfume of the Lady in Black (1931)
- Rouletabille the Aviator (1932)
- Liliom (1934)
- Miquette (1934)
- Cease Firing (1934)
- Veille d'armes (1935)
- Beautiful Days (1935)
- The Crew (1935)
- Jenny (1936)
- Yoshiwara (1937)
- The Lie of Nina Petrovna (1937)
- Barnabé (1938)
- Prince of My Heart (1938)
- Three from St Cyr (1939)
- The Path of Honour (1939)
- Case of Conscience (1939)
- The Rules of the Game (1939)
- Macao (1942)
- The Eternal Return (1943)
- The Mysteries of Paris (1943)
- Captain Fracasse (1943)
- Secret Documents (1945)
- We Are Not Married (1946)
- Dakota 308 (1951)
- The Inspector Likes a Fight (1957)
