= Chéri-Bibi and Cécily =

1916 novel

- 1948 edition
- Author: Gaston Leroux
- Language: French
- Genre: Adventure thriller
- Publication date: 1916
- Publication place: France
- Media type: Print
- Preceded by: Première Aventures de Chéri-Bibi
- Followed by: Nouvelles Aventures de Chéri-Bibi

Chéri-Bibi and Cécily (French: Chéri-Bibi et Cécily) is a 1916 adventure thriller novel by the French writer Gaston Leroux. A serial novel, it was the second of four works featuring the character of Chéri-Bibi.

== Synopsis ==
Having previously been wrongly convicted and sent to a penal colony and escaped, Chéri-Bibi and his fellow escapees are now in control of a ship and considering a career in piracy. A chance encounter with the Marquis du Touchais, the unworthy husband of Cécily the woman he loves, alters his plans. He takes the place of the Marquis and returns to France to enjoy a new life there and seek revenge on the man responsible for his troubles.

== Film adaptations ==
It was the inspiration for the 1931 American film The Phantom of Paris, directed by John S. Robertson and starring John Gilbert as Chéri-Bibi, and the 1955 French-Italian film Chéri-Bibi, directed by Marcello Pagliero and featuring Jean Richard in the title role.

== Bibliography ==
- Goble, Alan. The Complete Index to Literary Sources in Film. Walter de Gruyter, 1999.
- Hubin, Allen J. Crime Fiction, 1749-1980: A Comprehensive Bibliography. Garland Publishing, 1984.
- Soister, John T. & Nicolella, Henry. Down from the Attic: Rare Thrillers of the Silent Era through the 1950s. McFarland, 2016.
