= Chéri-Bibi (1955 film) =

1955 film directed by Marcello Pagliero

- Directed by: Marcello Pagliero
- Written by: Paul Mesnier
- Based on: Chéri-Bibi and Cécily by Gaston Leroux
- Produced by: Henri Lavorel
- Starring: Jean Richard; Lea Padovani; Danielle Godet
- Cinematography: Mario Montuori
- Edited by: Giuliana Attenni
- Music by: Georges Auric
- Production companies: Memnon Films; Union Générale Cinématographique; Taurus Film; Ariel Films
- Distributed by: L'Alliance Générale de Distribution Cinématographique
- Release date: 26 May 1955
- Running time: 84 minutes
- Countries: France; Italy
- Language: French

Chéri-Bibi is a 1955 French-Italian adventure drama film directed by Marcello Pagliero and starring Jean Richard, Lea Padovani and Danielle Godet. It is based on the 1916 novel Chéri-Bibi and Cécily by Gaston Leroux. It was shot at the Cinecittà Studios in Rome and on location around Paris. The film's sets were designed by the art director Franco Lolli. It was filmed in Ferraniacolor.

== Synopsis ==
Wrongly accused of a crime Chéri-Bibi is sentence to imprisonment on the penal colony of Devil's Island in French Guiana. During the journey he leads a mutiny of the prisoners and they gain control of the ship. In the middle of the ocean he comes across a raft with the castaway Maxime du Touchais, the unworthy husband of Cécily the woman Chéri-Bibi loves. Taking the man's identity, Chéri-Bibi returns to France to seek revenge on those responsible for his fate and to seek a new future with Cécily.

== Cast ==
- Jean Richard as Chéri-bibi / Maxime du Touchais
- Lea Padovani as La Comtesse
- Arnoldo Foà as Le Kanak
- Danielle Godet as Cécily du Touchais
- Raymond Bussières as La Ficelle
- Carlo Ninchi as Le Commandant
- Andrée Servilanges as Jacqueline
- Albert Préjean as Inspecteur Costaud
- Memmo Carotenuto as Faccia di bronzo
- Ubaldo Lay as Conte Ponte-Marie
- Nino Vingelli as Palla di Gomma
- Gino Scotti as Piccolo Santo
- Erminio Spalla as Il rosso
- Nietta Zocchi as La governante
- Raf Pindi as Secondo ufficiale

== See also ==
- The Phantom of Paris, a 1931 film
- Chéri-Bibi, a 1938 film
- Chéri-Bibi, a 1974 TV series

== Bibliography ==
- Roust, Colin Thomas. Sounding French: The Film Music and Criticism of Georges Auric, 1919-1945. University of Michigan, 2007.
- Soister, John T. & Nicolella, Henry. Down from the Attic: Rare Thrillers of the Silent Era through the 1950s. McFarland, 2016.
