= Hake Talbot =

American novelist (1900–1986)

Hake Talbot is a pen name of the American writer Henning Nelms (November 30, 1900 – May 1986). Talbot was chiefly known for his impossible crime, locked room mystery novel Rim of the Pit (1944). Nelms reserved his real name for writing non-fiction about showmanship (his chief occupation was as a stage magician). He was the author of the book Magic and Showmanship: A Handbook for Conjurers (1969).

During a 1981 poll by experts arranged by Edward D. Hoch, for the preface of his anthology All But Impossible!, Talbot's Rim of the Pit stood second, next only to John Dickson Carr's The Hollow Man (1935) as the best locked room mystery. Another novel, The Hangman's Handyman, which Talbot wrote in 1942, was not as successful. He also wrote two short stories, "The High House" and "The Other Side".

Talbot is the only Carr imitator whose work could actually be preferred to that of Carr himself ... I hope it is clear ... that while Talbot was influenced by Carr's approach, he in all cases showed plenty of personal creativity.

— Mike Grost
