= The Perfume of the Lady in Black (1931 film) =

1931 French mystery film

- Directed by: Marcel L'Herbier
- Written by: Gaston Leroux (novel); Marcel L'Herbier
- Produced by: Adolphe Osso
- Starring: Roland Toutain; Huguette Duflos; Marcel Vibert
- Cinematography: Louis Page; Georges Périnal
- Edited by: Suzanne Catelain; Lothar Wolff
- Production company: Les Films Osso
- Distributed by: Les Films Osso
- Release date: 6 November 1931
- Running time: 109 minutes
- Country: France
- Language: French

The Perfume of the Lady in Black (French: Le parfum de la dame en noir) is a 1931 French mystery film directed by Marcel L'Herbier and starring Roland Toutain, Huguette Duflos, and Marcel Vibert. It is an adaptation of the 1908 novel The Perfume of the Lady in Black by Gaston Leroux featuring the detective Joseph Rouletabille. It follows on from L'Herbier's The Mystery of the Yellow Room made the previous year.

It was shot at the Francoeur Studios in Paris. The film's sets were designed by the art director Pierre Schild.

== Cast ==
- Roland Toutain as Joseph Rouletabille
- Huguette Duflos as Mathilde
- Marcel Vibert as Le vieux Bob
- Léon Belières as Sainclair
- Edmond Van Daële as Robert Darzac
- Wera Engels as Edith Rance
- Kissa Kouprine as Marie
- Henri Kerny as Le père Jacques
- Michel Kovally as Le prince Galitch

== Bibliography ==
- Dayna Oscherwitz & MaryEllen Higgins. The A to Z of French Cinema. Scarecrow Press, 2009.
- Spicer, Andrew. Historical Dictionary of Film Noir. Scarecrow Press, 2010.
