= René Allio =

French film and theater director

René Allio (French: [aljo]; 3 August 1924 in Marseille – 27 March 1995 in Paris) was a French set designer for the theater and a film and theater director.

== Filmography ==
- The Shameless Old Lady, by Bertolt Brecht (La Vieille Dame indigne, 1965)
- Le cercle de craie caucasien, by Bertolt Brecht (1965)
- La bonne Âme de Setchouan, by Bertolt Brecht (1966)
- Pierre et Paul (1969)
- Moi, Pierre Rivière, ayant égorgé ma mère, ma soeur et mon frère... (1976)
- Retour à Marseille (1980)
- Le matelot 512 (1984)
- Transit (1991)
