= The Phantom of Paris =

1931 film

- Directed by: John S. Robertson
- Screenplay by: Bess Meredyth; Edwin Justus Mayer; John Meehan
- Based on: the novel Chéri-Bibi and Cécily by Gaston Leroux
- Starring: John Gilbert; Leila Hyams; Lewis Stone; Jean Hersholt; C. Aubrey Smith; Natalie Moorhead
- Cinematography: Oliver T. Marsh
- Edited by: Jack Ogilvie
- Production company: Metro-Goldwyn-Mayer
- Distributed by: Metro-Goldwyn-Mayer
- Release date: September 12, 1931
- Running time: 74 minutes
- Country: United States
- Language: English

The Phantom of Paris is a 1931 American pre-Code drama film directed by John S. Robertson and written by Bess Meredyth, Edwin Justus Mayer and John Meehan. The film stars John Gilbert and Leila Hyams, and is based on the 1913 novel Chéri-Bibi and Cécily by Gaston Leroux. The film was released on September 12, 1931, by Metro-Goldwyn-Mayer. The studio simultaneously made and released a Spanish-language version, Chéri-Bibi, directed by Carlos F. Borcosque and starring Ernesto Vilches. A later 1955 French-Italian film Chéri-Bibi was based on the same novel.

== Plot ==
Chéri-Bibi, a Houdini-like magician and escape artist, is the toast of Paris, except among certain members of the upper-class, who consider him a charlatan. Unfortunately, one of them is the nobleman Bourrelier, whose daughter Cecily is madly in love with Bibi (and vice versa), despite being engaged to the Marquis Du Touchais. One night at a party, Bibi and Bourrelier get into a fierce argument over Cecily, with her father ordering Bibi not to see her again. Moments later, he is found dead, and Bibi is naturally assumed to have killed him. He is arrested and sent to prison, but manages to escape four years later. While hiding out at the home of a friend, Herman, he overhears that Bourrelier was actually murdered by the Marquis, who was afraid of losing out on Cecily's inheritance. Bibi goes to his house to make him confess, but the Marquis is dying of the flu. He admits to the killing, aided by his lover Vera, but expires before Bibi can get a witness. Fearful of being blamed for a second death, Bibi takes the body and flees to a friendly doctor, Gorin, who agrees to use plastic surgery to make Bibi look like the Marquis. He eventually reappears in his new guise, telling the public that Bibi has died and that he had suffered a head injury which conveniently affected his memory. He learns that in his absence Cecily married the Marquis but had been deeply unhappy and still loves Bibi. Eventually he reveals himself and they embrace, but the reunion is short-lived: Detective Costaud, who has smelled a rat since the beginning, appears and demands to fingerprint "the Marquis" to see if they match those of Bibi. They do and he submits to the arrest. He promptly escapes and confronts Vera, demanding she tell the police everything. She refuses, but by admitting her participation she implicates herself: the escape was fake and Costaud overheard everything. She is placed under arrest, and Bibi and Cecily are free to get on with their lives.

== Cast ==
- John Gilbert as Chéri-Bibi
- Leila Hyams as Cecile
- Lewis Stone as Costaud
- Jean Hersholt as Herman
- C. Aubrey Smith as Bourrelier
- Natalie Moorhead as Vera
- Ian Keith as Marquis Du Touchais
- Alfred Hickman as Dr. Gorin
- Claude King as Attorney
