= The Mystery of the Yellow Room =

1908 novel by Gaston Leroux

- Cover of the 1908 first edition
- Author: Gaston Leroux
- Original title: Le mystère de la chambre jaune
- Language: French
- Series: Joseph Rouletabille
- Genre: Mystery fiction
- Publisher: L'Illustration (in serial); Editions Pierre Lafitte (book)
- Publication date: 1907 in serial January 1908 in book form
- Publication place: France
- Media type: Print (Hardcover and Paperback), Audiobook
- Pages: 236 (1998 paperback)
- ISBN: 1-873982-38-0 (1998 paperback)
- OCLC: 59584573
- Followed by: The Perfume of the Lady in Black

The Mystery of the Yellow Room (French: Le mystère de la chambre jaune) is a mystery novel written by French author Gaston Leroux. One of the first locked-room mystery novels, it was first published serially in France in the periodical L'Illustration from September 1907 to November 1907, then in its own right in 1908.

It is the first novel starring fictional reporter Joseph Rouletabille and concerns a complex, and seemingly impossible, crime in which the criminal appears to disappear from a locked room. Leroux provides the reader with detailed, precise diagrams and floorplans illustrating the crime scene. The story provides an intellectual challenge to the reader.

The novel finds its continuation in the 1908 novel The Perfume of the Lady in Black, wherein a number of the characters familiar from this story reappear.

== Plot summary ==
Reporter and amateur sleuth Joseph Rouletabille is sent to investigate a criminal case at the Château du Glandier and takes along his friend, the lawyer Jean Sainclair, who narrates. Mathilde Stangerson, the 30-something daughter of the castle's owner, Professor Stangerson, was found near-critically battered in a room adjacent to his laboratory on the castle grounds with the door still locked from the inside. She recovers slowly but can give no useful testimony. Rouletabille meets and interrogates several characters: the castle's concierges, Mr and Mrs Bernier; the old servant Jacques; an unfriendly inn landlord; and a womanising gamekeeper, and begins a friendly rivalry with France's top police detective, Frédéric Larsan, who has been assigned the case. Larsan suspects Mlle. Stangerson's fiancé, another scientist called Robert Darzac, to Rouletabille's dismay.

More attempts are made on Mlle. Stangerson's life despite Rouletabille and Larsan's protection, and the perpetrator appears to vanish on two occasions when they are closing in on him, echoing Professor Stangerson's research into "matter dissociation". The gamekeeper is murdered during the second attempt. Ultimately, Larsan arrests Darzac who is charged with murder attempts. Rouletabille suspects that Darzac has secret reasons not to defend himself and he disappears to make further investigations.

Two-and-a-half months later, as Darzac's trial opens, Rouletabille reappears sensationally and tells the court that the culprit is Frédéric Larsan himself, whom he accuses of being an alter-ego of a master criminal called Ballmeyer. Larsan appeared to vanish on the two occasions he was nearly collared as he was one of the pursuers. Darzac is released when it emerges that Larsan has vanished after Rouletabille warned him he would accuse him in court. The mystery of the locked Yellow Room is explained thus: Larsan assaulted Mlle. Stangerson earlier in the day than originally thought, but she hid the traces of the attack and locked herself away. During the night, traumatised by the event, she fell off her bed and inflicted the gravest of the wounds by hitting her temple on the corner of her bed-side table.

The background to these events is kept secret in court but finally explained by Sainclair. Ballmeyer, in a different guise, had seduced Mlle. Stangerson in her youth and married her secretly in the United States. They had a child before he was arrested and his identity revealed to her. Mlle. Stangerson had arranged for her son's care and education and hidden the whole saga from her father; her silence and Robert Darzac's behaviour were motivated by her desperation to keep him from finding out. Ballmeyer however, hearing that she was engaged, had decided to reappear in her life and claim her as his wife once more, by force if necessary.

== Characters ==
- Joseph Rouletabille – the young journalist and amateur detective, protagonist.
- Jean Sainclair – Rouletabille's friend and lawyer, the narrator.
- Frédéric Larsan – the police detective.
- Professor Stangerson – the scientist, owner of "Chateau du Glandier".
- Mademoiselle Mathilde Stangerson – daughter of a famous scientist, the victim.
- "Father" Jacques – an old servant in the Stangerson family.
- Robert Darzac – a scientist and Mlle. Stangerson's fiancé.
- The Green Man – the gamekeeper, disliked by all.

== Reception ==
John Dickson Carr, a writer of locked-room mysteries, has his detective Dr. Gideon Fell declare this the "best detective tale ever written", in his novel The Hollow Man (1935).

Agatha Christie praised The Mystery of the Yellow Room through the mouthpiece of her detective Hercule Poirot in her 1963 novel The Clocks:

And here is The Mystery of the Yellow Room. That - ah, that is really a classic! I approve of it from start to finish. Such a logical approach! There were criticisms of it, I remember, which said it was unfair. But it is not unfair, my dear Colin. No, no. Very nearly so, perhaps, but no not quite. There is the hair's breadth of difference. No. All through there is truth, concealed with a careful and cunning use of words. Everything should be clear at that supreme moment when the men meet at the angle of the three corridors." He laid it down reverently. "Definitely a masterpiece, and, I gather, almost forgotten nowadays.

In a 1981 poll by Edward D. Hoch of 17 mystery writers and reviewers, this novel was voted the third-best locked-room mystery of all time, behind Hake Talbot's Rim of the Pit (1944) and John Dickson Carr's The Hollow Man (1935).

The popular 1946 Japanese detective novel The Honjin Murders (本陣殺人事件, Honjin satsujin jiken) by Seishi Yokomizo refers to The Mystery of the Yellow Room numerous times, the narrator quipping that Leroux's novel "bears the closest resemblance" to the story recounted in the novel.

The final episode of the 2025 Netflix miniseries The Residence is titled The Mystery of the Yellow Room and concludes the series with a locked-room murder deduction.

== Adaptations ==
Stage:

- The Mystery of the Yellow Room by Leroux opened 14 February 1912 in Paris, and a translation by Hannaford Bennett played 93 performances at the St James Theatre in London in 1920. Sybil Thorndike played Mathilde.

Film and TV:

- The Mystery of the Yellow Room (1913)
- The Mystery of the Yellow Room (1919)
- The Mystery of the Yellow Room (1930)
- El misterio del cuarto amarillo (1947) at IMDb
- The Mystery of the Yellow Room (1949)
- Mystère de la chambre jaune, Le (1965) at IMDb
- The Mystery of the Yellow Room (2003)
- An episode of Jonathan Creek features a stage adaptation of the novel and centres around a similar event happening to one of its actors.

Radio:

- Gaston Leroux – The Mystery of the Yellow Room, BBC Radio 4, 1998, starring Nicholas Boulton and Geoffrey Whitehead

== Release details ==
- 1907, France, L'illustration, Pub September–November 1907, magazine serial (in French)
- 1908, France, Editions Jacques Lafitte (ISBN NA), (First edition) (in French)
- 1934, UK, Oxford University Press ISBN 0-19-832345-X, (in French)
- 1977, UK, Dover Publications ISBN 0-486-23460-6
- 1978, UK, Remploy ISBN 0-7066-0759-7
- 1996, US, Books on Tape ISBN 5-557-12771-2
- 1996, US, Buccaneer Books ISBN 0-89966-141-6
- 1997, UK, Dedalus Ltd ISBN 1-873982-38-0
- 2002, US, Indypublish.com ISBN 1-4043-2003-2
- 2002, US, Indypublish.com ISBN 1-4043-2002-4
- 2004, UK, Thorndike Press ISBN 0-7862-6991-X
- 2005, US, Kessinger Publishing ISBN 0-7661-9366-7
- 2006, UK, Blackstone Audiobooks ISBN 0-7861-7523-0, audio book (MP3 CD)
- 2006, UK, Dover Publications ISBN 0-486-44928-9
- 2009, US, Black Coat Press ISBN 1-934543-60-8

== See also ==
- Whodunit
