= The Perfume of the Lady in Black (novel) =

1908 novel by Gaston Leroux

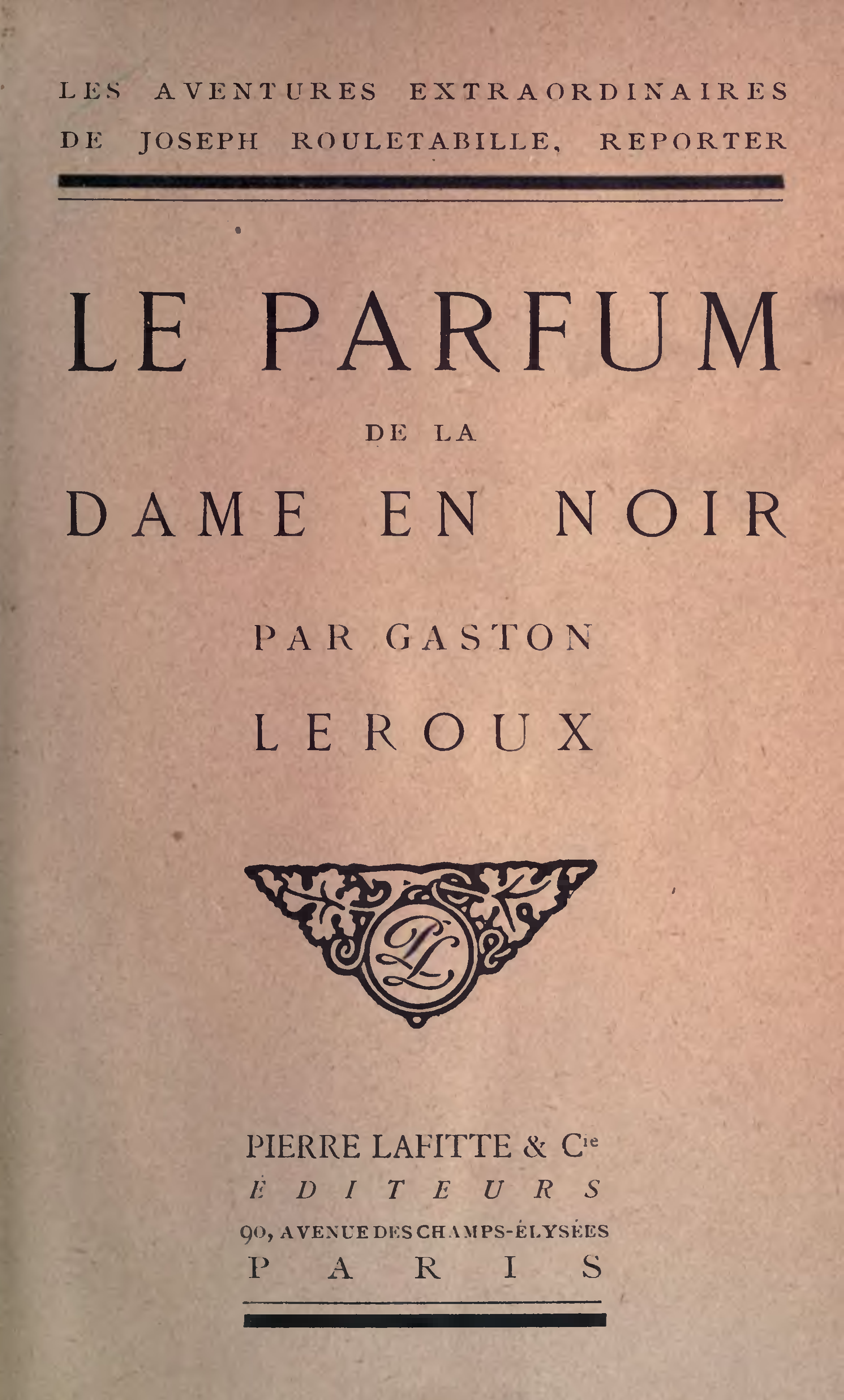
- Author: Gaston Leroux
- Language: French
- Genre: Mystery
- Publication date: 1908
- Publication place: France
- Media type: Print
- Preceded by: The Mystery of the Yellow Room
- Followed by: The Secret of the Night

The Perfume of the Lady in Black (French: Le parfum de la dame en noir) is a 1908 mystery novel by the French writer Gaston Leroux. It is the second in the series of books featuring the fictional detective Joseph Rouletabille, preceded by The Mystery of the Yellow Room.

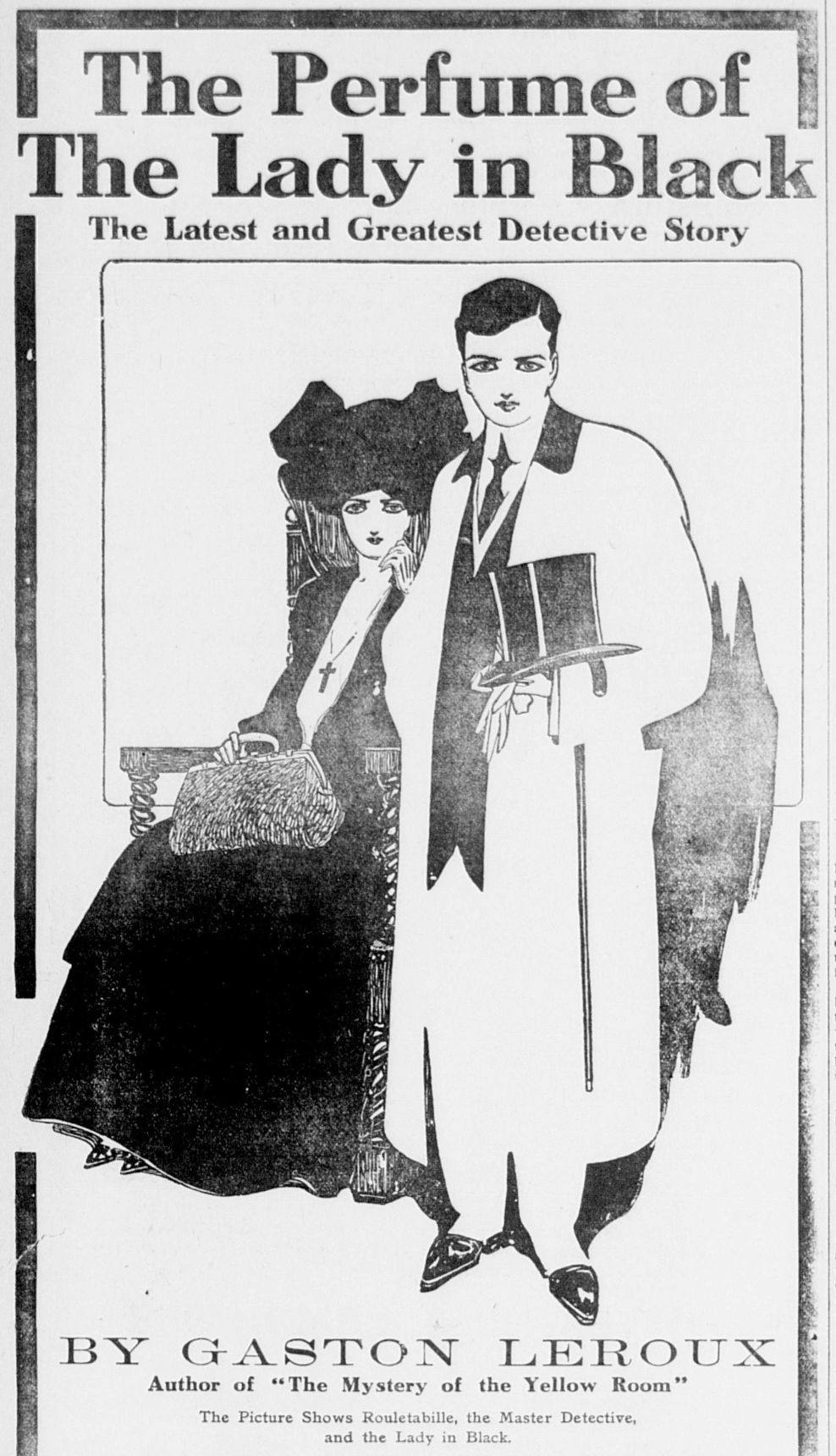
Advert for Novel 'The Perfume of The Lady in Black' posted in the Courier Gazette: Tuesday, March 1, 1910

== Adaptations ==
The novel has been adapted into film on several occasions including

- The Perfume of the Lady in Black (1914)
- The Perfume of the Lady in Black (1931)
- The Perfume of the Lady in Black (1949)
- The Perfume of the Lady in Black (2005)

== Bibliography ==
- Hall, Ann C. Phantom Variations: The Adaptations of Gaston Leroux's Phantom of the Opera, 1925 to the Present. McFarland, 2009.
