= Locked-room mystery =

Subgenre of detective fiction

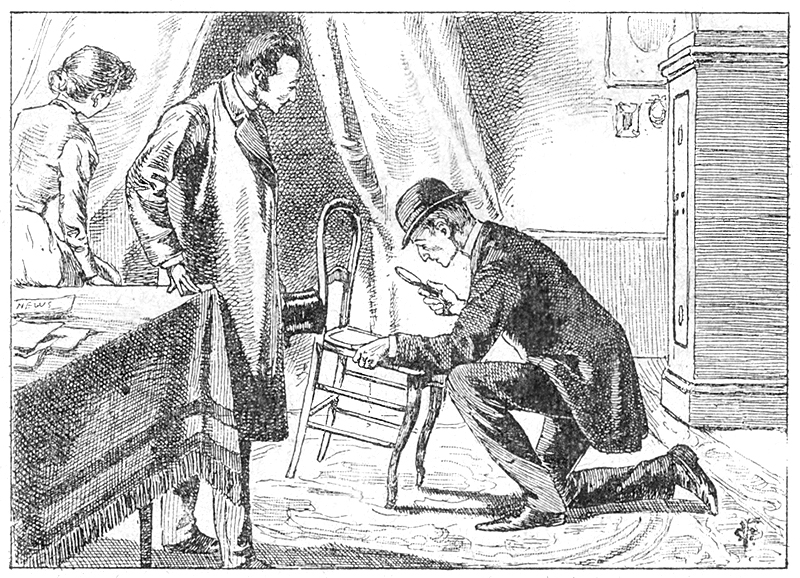
The detective Sherlock Holmes searches for clues in "The Adventure of the Speckled Band" (1892), following a murder in a room where the door had been locked from the inside.

The "locked-room" or "impossible crime" mystery is a type of crime, typically murder ("locked-room murder"), that appears in crime and detective fiction, in which the circumstances make it seem impossible for the perpetrator to have entered the crime scene, committed the crime, and left undetected. The crime in question typically involves a situation whereby an intruder could not have left; for example, the original literal "locked room": a murder victim found in a windowless room locked from the inside at the time of discovery. Following other conventions of classic detective fiction, the reader is normally presented with the puzzle and all of the clues, and is encouraged to solve the mystery before the solution is revealed in a dramatic climax.

The prima facie impression from a locked room crime is that the perpetrator is a dangerous, supernatural entity capable of defying the laws of nature by walking through walls or vanishing into thin air. The need for a rational explanation for the crime is what drives the protagonist to look beyond these appearances and solve the puzzle.

== History ==
=== Early locked-room mysteries: 1830s—1930s ===
Edgar Allan Poe's "The Murders in the Rue Morgue" (1841) is generally considered the first locked-room mystery. However, Robert Adey credits Sheridan Le Fanu for "A Passage in the Secret History of an Irish Countess" (1838), which was published three years before Poe's "Rue Morgue".

Other early locked-room mysteries include Israel Zangwill's The Big Bow Mystery (1892); "The Adventure of the Speckled Band" (1892) and "The Adventure of the Empty House" (1903), two Sherlock Holmes stories by Arthur Conan Doyle; "The Problem of Cell 13" (1905) by Jacques Futrelle, featuring "The Thinking Machine" Augustus S. F. X. Van Dusen; and Le Mystère de la Chambre Jaune (The Mystery of the Yellow Room), written in 1907 by French journalist and author Gaston Leroux. G. K. Chesterton's Father Brown stories, beginning in 1911, often featured locked-room mysteries.

=== Golden Age: 1920s—1950s ===
In the 1920s and 1930s, many authors wrote locked-room mysteries, such as S. S. Van Dine in The Canary Murder Case (1927), Ellery Queen in The Chinese Orange Mystery (1934), and Freeman Wills Crofts in such novels as Sudden Death and The End of Andrew Harrison (1938).

Pulp magazines in the 1930s often contained impossible crime tales, dubbed weird menace, in which a series of supernatural or science-fiction type events is eventually explained rationally. Notable practitioners of the period were Fredric Brown, Paul Chadwick and, to a certain extent, Cornell Woolrich, although these writers tended to rarely use the Private Eye protagonists that many associate with pulp fiction. Quite a few comic book impossible crimes seem to draw on the "weird menace" tradition of the pulps. However, celebrated writers such as G. K. Chesterton, Arthur Conan Doyle, Clayton Rawson, and Sax Rohmer have also had their works adapted to comic book form. In 1934, Dashiell Hammett created the comic strip Secret Agent X9, illustrated by Alex Raymond, which contained a locked-room episode. One American comic book series that made good use of locked-room mysteries is Mike W. Barr's Maze Agency.

John Dickson Carr, who also wrote as Carter Dickson, was known as "master of the locked-room mystery". His 1935 novel The Hollow Man (US title: The Three Coffins) was in 1981 voted the best locked-room mystery novel of all time by 17 authors and reviewers, although Carr himself names Leroux's The Mystery of the Yellow Room as his favorite. (Leroux's novel was named third in that same poll; Hake Talbot's Rim of the Pit (1944) was named second.) Three other Carr/Dickson novels were in the top ten of the 1981 list: The Crooked Hinge (1938), The Judas Window (1938), and The Peacock Feather Murders (1937).

In French, Pierre Boileau, Thomas Narcejac, Gaston Boca, Marcel Lanteaume, Pierre Véry, Noel Vindry, and the Belgian Stanislas-André Steeman were other important "impossible crime" writers, Vindry being the most prolific with 16 novels. Edgar Faure, who later to become Prime Minister of France, also wrote in the genre, but was not particularly successful.

During the Golden Age of Detective Fiction, English-speaking writers dominated the genre, but after the 1940s there was a general waning of English-language output. French authors continued writing into the 1950s and early 1960s, notably Martin Meroy and Boileau-Narcejac, who joined forces to write several locked-room novels. They also co-authored the psychological thrillers which brought them international fame, two of which were adapted for the screen as Vertigo (1954 novel; 1958 film) and Diabolique (1955 film). The most prolific writer during the period immediately following the Golden Age was Japanese: Akimitsu Takagi wrote almost 30 locked-room mysteries, starting in 1949 and continuing to his death in 1995. A number have been translated into English. In Robert van Gulik's mystery novel The Chinese Maze Murders (1951), one of the cases solved by Judge Dee is an example of the locked-room subgenre.

=== Late twentieth century: 1970s–present ===
The genre continued into the 1970s and beyond. Bill Pronzini's Nameless Detective novels feature locked-room puzzles. The most prolific creator of impossible crimes is Edward D. Hoch, whose short stories feature a detective, Dr. Sam Hawthorne, whose main role is as a country physician. The majority of Hoch stories feature impossible crimes; one appeared in EQMM every month from May 1973 through January 2008. Hoch's protagonist is a gifted amateur detective who uses pure brainpower to solve his cases.

The French writer Paul Halter, who wrote over 30 novels, almost exclusively in the locked-room genre, has been described as the natural successor to John Dickson Carr. Although strongly influenced by Carr and Agatha Christie, he has a unique writing style featuring original plots and puzzles. A collection of ten of his short stories, entitled The Night of the Wolf, has been translated into English. The Japanese writer Soji Shimada has been writing impossible crime stories since 1981. The first, The Tokyo Zodiac Murders (1981), and the second, Murder in the Crooked House (1982), are the only ones to have been translated into English. The themes of the Japanese novels are far more grisly and violent than those of the more genteel Anglo-Saxons. Dismemberment is a preferred murder method. Despite the gore, most norms of the classic detective fiction novel are strictly followed.

Umberto Eco, in his 2000 novel Baudolino, takes the locked-room theme into medieval times. The book's plot suggests that Holy Roman Emperor Frederick I had not drowned in a river, as history records, but died mysteriously at night while a guest at the castle of a sinister Armenian noble. The book features various suspects, each of whom had a clever means of killing the Emperor without entering the room where he slept – all these means having been available in medieval times.

The locked-room genre also appears in children's detective fiction, although the crime committed is usually less severe than murder. One notable author is Enid Blyton, who wrote several juvenile detective series, often featuring seemingly impossible crimes that her young amateur detectives set out to solve. The Hardy Boys novel While the Clock Ticked was (originally) about a locked and isolated room where a man seeks privacy, but receives mysterious threatening messages there. The messages are delivered by a mechanical device lowered into the room through a chimney. The Japanese manga written by Gosho Aoyama Case Closed features many locked-rooms crimes, usually murders, showing different solutions to how the crime scenes were set up. King Ottokar's Sceptre (1938–1939) is the only Tintin adventure that is a locked-room mystery. No homicide is involved; rather the crime is the disappearance of the royal sceptre, which is bound to have disastrous consequences for the king.

The British TV series Jonathan Creek has a particular 'speciality' for locked-room-murder style mysteries. The eponymous protagonist, Jonathan Creek, designs magic tricks for stage magicians, and is often called on to solve cases where the most important element of the mystery is clearly how the crime was committed, such as a man who allegedly shot himself in a sealed bunker when he had crippling arthritis in his hands, how a woman was shot in a sealed room with no gun and without the window being opened or broken, how a dead body could have vanished from a locked room when the only door was in full view of someone else, etc.

The British TV series Death in Paradise also commonly uses locked-room mysteries, sometimes a literal locked room, but sometimes a situation where the victim is found in a location that nobody else appears to have entered or left.

In the 21st century, examples of popular detective series novels that include locked-room type puzzles are The Girl with the Dragon Tattoo (2005) by Stieg Larssen, Bloodhounds (2004) by Peter Lovesey, and In the Morning I'll Be Gone (2014) by Adrian McKinty, while locked-room puzzles are a major plot point and discussed at length in the visual novels Umineko When They Cry, Danganronpa and Phoenix Wright: Ace Attorney: Dual Destinies.

Wake Up Dead Man (2025), the third film in Rian Johnson’s Knives Out series, features detective Benoit Blanc investigating an apparently impossible murder. The film engages with the locked-room mystery tradition, and John Dickson Carr’s The Hollow Man is referenced and discussed by characters within the film.

== Real-life examples ==
- Professional bridge player and writer Joseph Bowne Elwell was shot in 1920 while inside his locked Manhattan home. The case inspired the 1926 mystery novel The Benson Murder Case.
- According to a report in The New York Times, March 10 and 11, 1929, Isidore Fink, of 4 East 132nd Street, New York City, was in his Fifth Avenue laundry on the night of March 9, 1929, with the windows closed and door of the room bolted. A neighbor heard screams and the sound of blows, but not shots, and called the police, who were unable to get in. A young boy was lifted through the transom and was able to unbolt the door. The police found Fink dead with two bullet wounds in his chest and one in his left wrist. No money had been taken, and no weapon was found at the scene. It was theorised that the murderer may have climbed the outside of the building and fired through the transom, but a powder burn on Fink's wrist indicated that he had been shot at close range. Interviewed some years later, Police Commissioner Mulrooney called the Fink murder an "insoluble mystery".
- On May 16, 1937, Laetitia Toureaux was found stabbed to death in an otherwise empty first-class compartment of the Paris Métro. The subway train had left the terminus, Porte de Charenton, at 6:27 p.m. and had arrived at the next station, Porte Dorée, at 6:28 p.m. Witnesses did not see anyone else enter or leave the compartment where Mlle. Toureaux's body was found. The murderer had one minute and twenty seconds at their disposal. Neither the murderer nor the method of their escape was ever discovered.
- In 2010, the uninjured dead body of Gareth Williams, an employee of the Secret Intelligence Service (MI6), was found in a bag that had been zipped up and padlocked from the outside, with a key inside. There was no forensic evidence of anyone else's involvement. Two escapologists investigated whether he could somehow have locked himself inside the bag. After 400 unsuccessful attempts one of them would still not completely rule out the possibility.

== See also ==
- Closed circle of suspects (genre)
