= The Perfume of the Lady in Black (2005 film) =

- Directed by: Bruno Podalydès
- Written by: Gaston Leroux (novel); Bruno Podalydès
- Produced by: Martine Cassinelli; Pascal Caucheteux; Grégoire Sorlat
- Starring: Denis Podalydès; Sabine Azéma; Zabou Breitman
- Cinematography: Christophe Beaucarne
- Edited by: Hervé de Luze; Elise Fievet
- Music by: Philippe Sarde
- Production companies: Why Not Productions; France 2 Cinéma
- Distributed by: UGC Fox Distribution
- Release date: 14 September 2005
- Running time: 115 minutes
- Country: France
- Language: French

The Perfume of the Lady in Black (French: Le parfum de la dame en noir) is a 2005 French comedy mystery film directed by Bruno Podalydès and starring Denis Podalydès, Sabine Azéma and Zabou Breitman. It is inspired by the 1908 novel of the same title by Gaston Leroux featuring the detective Joseph Rouletabille. It is a sequel to the 2003 film The Mystery of the Yellow Room.

== Cast ==
- Denis Podalydès as Joseph Rouletabille
- Sabine Azéma as Mathilde Stangerson
- Zabou Breitman as Edith Rance
- Olivier Gourmet as Robert Darzac
- Jean-Noël Brouté as Sainclair
- Pierre Arditi as Frédéric Larsan / Naja-Bey
- Vincent Elbaz as Prince Galitch
- Michael Lonsdale as Le professeur Stangerson
- Julos Beaucarne as Le père Jacques / Vieux Bob
- Isabelle Candelier as Mme Bernier
- Dominique Parent as M. Bernier
- Bruno Podalydès as Arthur Rance
- Michel Vuillermoz as Le curé
- Roger Roka as Rikki Matoni
- Vincent Vedo Velli as Brignolles
- Sylvain Solustri as Tullio
- Jean Podalydès as Rouletabille enfant
- Claude Rich as Le juge de Marquet

== Bibliography ==
- Alistair Fox, Michel Marie, Raphaëlle Moine & Hilary Radner. A Companion to Contemporary French Cinema. John Wiley & Sons, 2015.
