= Gaston Leroux =

French author and journalist (1868–1927)

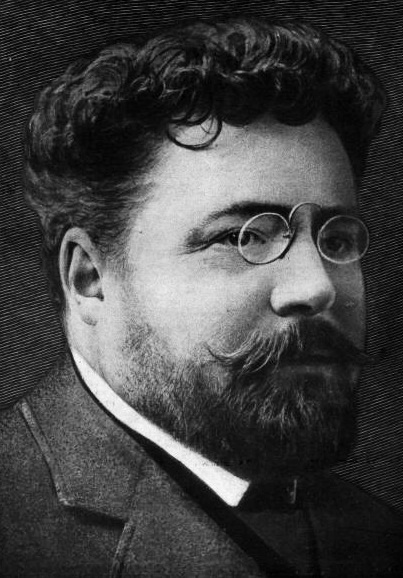
- Leroux in 1907
- Born: Gaston Louis Alfred Leroux; 6 May 1868; Paris, France
- Died: 15 April 1927 (aged 58); Nice, France
- Occupations: Journalist, author
- Writing career
- Notable work: The Phantom of the Opera

Gaston Louis Alfred Leroux (French: [ɡastɔ̃ lwi alfʁɛd ləʁu]; 6 May 1868 – 15 April 1927) was a French journalist and author of detective fiction.

In the English-speaking world, he is best known for writing the novel The Phantom of the Opera (French: Le Fantôme de l'Opéra, 1910), which has been made into several film and stage productions of the same name, notably the 1925 film starring Lon Chaney and Andrew Lloyd Webber's 1986 musical. His 1908 novel The Mystery of the Yellow Room is one of the most celebrated locked room mysteries.

== Life and career ==
Leroux was born in Paris in 1868, the illegitimate child of Marie Bidaut and Dominique Leroux, who married a month after his birth. He claimed an illustrious pedigree, including descent from William II of England (in French, Guillaume le Roux), son of William the Conqueror, and social connections such as having been the official playmate of Prince Philippe, Count of Paris at the college d'Eu in Normandy. After schooling in Normandy and studying as a lawyer in Caen (graduating in 1889), He inherited millions of francs and lived wildly until he nearly reached bankruptcy. In 1890, he began working as a court reporter and theater critic for L'Écho de Paris. His most important journalism came when he began working as an international correspondent for the Paris newspaper Le Matin in 1893. He was present at, and covered, the 1905 Russian Revolution.

He left journalism in 1907, after returning from covering a volcanic eruption and being immediately sent on another assignment without vacation time, and began writing fiction. In 1919, he and Arthur Bernède formed their own film company, Société des Cinéromans, publishing novels and turning them into films. He first wrote a mystery novel titled Le mystère de la chambre jaune (1908; English title: The Mystery of the Yellow Room), starring the amateur detective Joseph Rouletabille. Leroux's contribution to French detective fiction is considered a parallel to those of Sir Arthur Conan Doyle in the United Kingdom and Edgar Allan Poe in the United States.

Leroux published his most famous work, The Phantom of the Opera, as a serial in 1909 and 1910, and as a book in 1910 (with an English translation appearing in 1911). Balaoo followed in 1911, which was made into a film several times (in 1913, 1927 and 1942).

Leroux was made a Chevalier de la Legion d'honneur in 1909. He died at age 58 in Nice, France, in 1927.

== Personal life ==
Leroux married twice, first to Marie Lefranc from whom he separated in 1902. Following his separation, he then lived with Jeanne Cayatte from Lorraine, with whom he had a son, Gaston, nicknamed Milinkij, and a daughter named Madeleine; they married in 1917 after Lefranc's death. In 1918, he founded a film production company, Société des Cinéromans with René Navarre, and debuted two films, Tue-la-Mort and Il etait deux petits enfants, in which his daughter played the lead role.

== Novels ==
=== The Adventures of Rouletabille ===
- 1908 – Le Mystère de la chambre jaune (English translations: The Mystery of the Yellow Room (1908), tr. anonymous; Rouletabille and The Mystery of the Yellow Room (2009), tr. Jean-Marc Lofficier & Randy Lofficier, ISBN 978-1-934543-60-3)
- 1908 – Le Parfum de la dame en noir (English translation: The Perfume of the Lady in Black (1909), tr. anonymous)
- 1913 – Rouletabille chez le Tsar (Rouletabille at the Tsar's) (English translation: The Secret of the Night (1914), tr. anonymous)
- 1914 – Rouletabille à la guerre: Le Château noir (The Black Castle)
- 1914 – Rouletabille à la guerre: Les étranges noces de Rouletabille (The Strange Wedding of Rouletabille)
- 1920 – Rouletabille chez Krupp (English translation: Rouletabille at Krupp's (2013), tr. Brian Stableford, ISBN 978-1-61227-144-6)
- 1922 – Le Crime de Rouletabille (The Crime of Rouletabille) (English translation: The Slave Bangle [UK] (1925), The Phantom Clue [US] (1926), tr. Hannaford Bennett)
- 1923 – Rouletabille chez les Bohémiens (Rouletabille and the Gypsies) (English translation: The Sleuth Hound [UK] (1926), The Octopus of Paris [US] (1927), tr. Hannaford Bennett)

=== Chéri Bibi ===
- 1921 – Premières Aventures de Chéri-Bibi: Les Cages flottantes, (English translation: The Floating Prison [UK] (1922), Wolves of the Sea [US] (1923), tr. Hannaford Bennett)
- 1921 – Premières Aventures de Chéri-Bibi: Chéri-Bibi et Cécily, (English translation: Cheri-Bibi and Cecily [UK] (1923), Missing Men: The Return of Cheri-Bibi [US] (1923), tr. Hannaford Bennett)
- 1921 – Nouvelles Aventures de Chéri-Bibi: Palas et Chéri-Bibi, (English translation: Cheri-Bibi, Mystery Man [UK] (1924), The Dark Road: Further Adventures of Cheri-Bibi [US] (1925), tr. Hannaford Bennet)
- 1921 – Nouvelles Aventures de Chéri-Bibi: Fatalitas!, (English translation: The Dancing Girl [UK] (1924), Nomads of the Night [US] (1925), tr. Hannaford Bennett)
- 1926 – Le Coup d'État de Chéri-Bibi (1926), (English translation: The New Idol: Further Adventures of Cheri-Bibi [UK] (1928), [US] (1929), tr. Hannaford Bennett)

=== Other Novels and Novellas ===
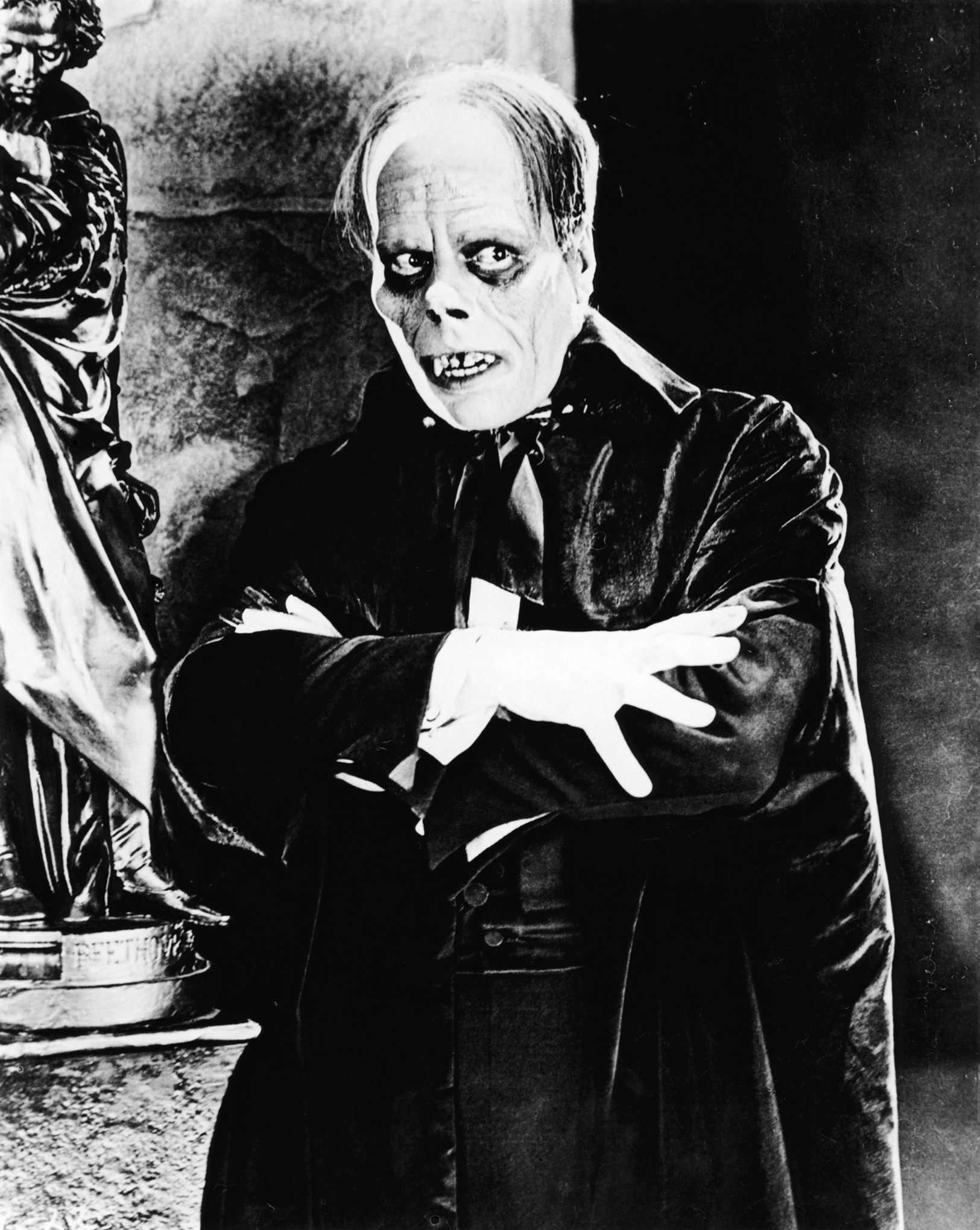
Still of Lon Chaney in The Phantom of the Opera (1925)

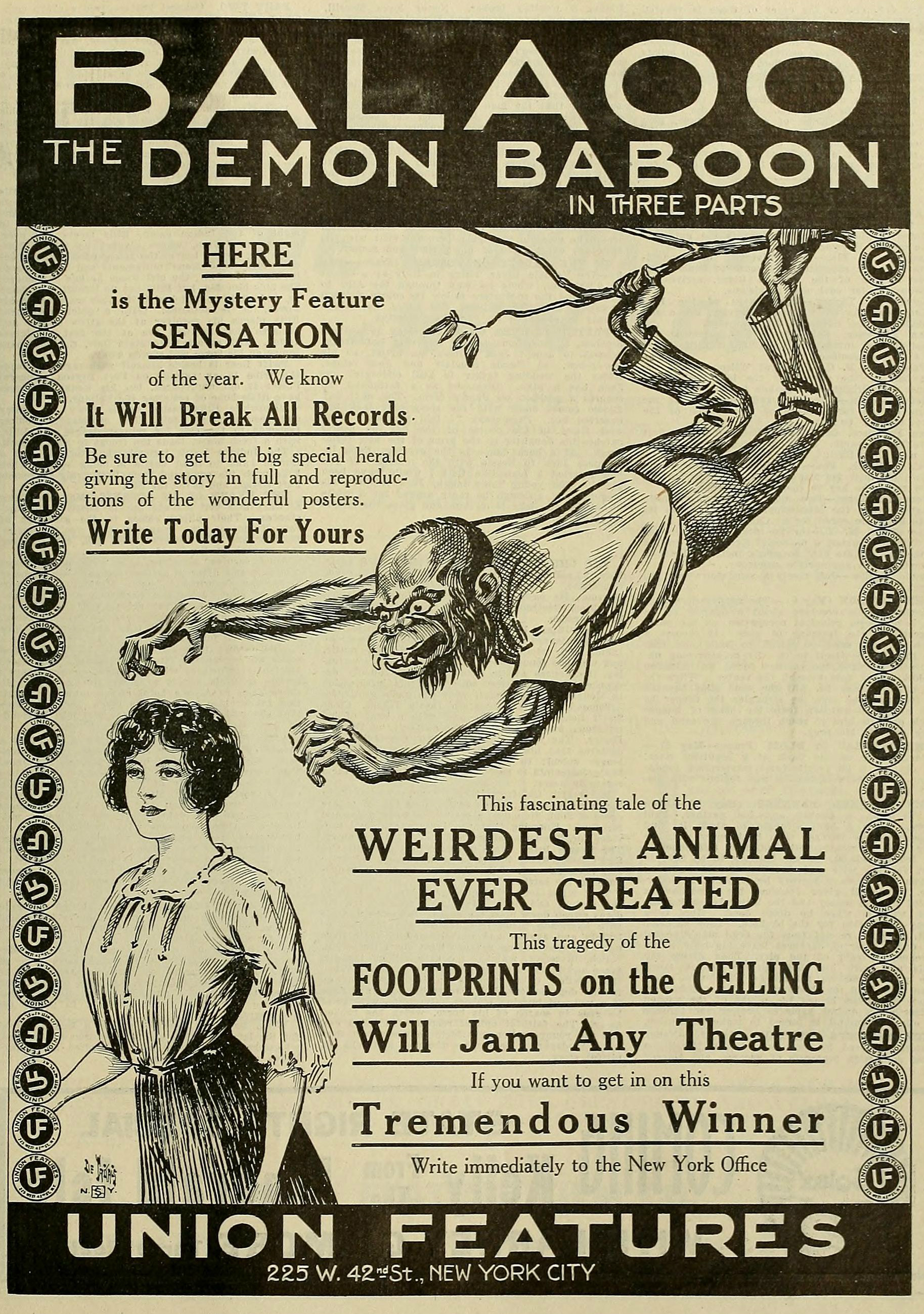
Poster of the film adaptation of Balaoo in 1913

- 1904 – La Double vie de Théophraste Longuet (English translations: The Double Life [US] (1909), [UK] (1916), tr. anonymous; The Man with the Black Feather (1912), tr. Edgar Jepson)
- 1910 – Le Roi mystère (The Mystery King)
- 1910 – Le Fantôme de l'Opéra (English translations: The Phantom of the Opera (1911), tr. Alexander Teixeira de Mattos; The Phantom of the Opera (1990), tr. Lowell Bair, ISBN 978-0553213768; The Essential Phantom of the Opera (1996), tr. Leonard Wolf, ISBN 978-0452273863; The Phantom of the Opera (2004), tr. Jean-Marc Lofficier & Randy Lofficier, ISBN 978-1-932983-13-5; The Phantom of the Opera (2009), tr. Mireille Ribière, ISBN 978-0141191508; The Phantom of the Opera (2012), tr. David Coward, ISBN 978-0199694570)
- 1911 – Le Fauteuil hanté (English translation: The Haunted Chair (1931), tr. Mildred Gleason Prochet & Morris Bentinck)
- 1911 – Un homme dans la nuit (A Man in the Night)
- 1912 – Balaoo (English translation: Balaoo (1913), tr. Alexander Teixeira de Mattos)
- 1913 – La Reine du Sabbat (English translation: Part I - The Midnight Lady (1930), Part II - The Missing Archduke (1931), tr. Hannaford Bennett)
- 1913 – L' Épouse du soleil (English translations: The Bride of the Sun [US] (1915), [UK] (1916), tr. anonymous; The Bride of the Sun (2021), tr. Jean-Marc & Randy Lofficier, ISBN 978-1-64932-038-4)
- 1916 – L' Homme qui revient de loin (English translation: The Man who Came Back from the Dead (1916), tr. Geoffrey Garrod)
- 1917 – Confitou
- 1917 – La Colonne infernale (The Infernal Column)
- 1920 – Le Capitaine Hyx (English translation: The Amazing Adventures of Carolus Herbert (1922), tr. Hannaford Bennett)
- 1920 – La Bataille invisible (English translation: The Veiled Prisoner (1923), tr. Hannaford Bennett)
- 1922 – Le Coeur cambriolé (English translation: The Burgled Heart [UK] (1925), The New Terror [US] (1926), tr. Hannaford Bennet)
- 1923 – Tue-la-Mort (English translation: The Masked Man [UK] (1927), [US] (1929), tr. Hannaford Bennet)
- 1923 – Le Sept de trèfle (The Seven of Clubs)
- 1924 – La Poupée sanglante (English translations: The Kiss That Killed (1934), tr. Hannaford Bennett; The Bloody Doll (2016), tr. Stephen Metcalf, ISBN 978-1-909923-70-6)
- 1924 – La Machine à assassiner (English translation: The Machine to Kill (1935), tr. Hannaford Bennett)
- 1925 – Les Ténébreuses (The Shadowy Ones)
- 1925 – La Farouche aventure (English translation: The Adventures of a Coquette (1926), tr. Hannaford Bennett)
- 1925 – La Mansarde en or (The Golden Attic)
- 1926 – Le Fils des trois pères (English translation: The Son of Three Fathers [UK] (1927), [US] (1928), tr. Hannaford Bennett)
- 1927 – Mister Flow (English translation: The Man of a Hundred Masks [UK] (1930), The Man of a Hundred Faces [US] (1930), tr. Hannaford Bennett)
- 1927 – Les Chasseurs de danses (finished posthumously from Leroux's notes by Charles de Richter)
- 1928 – Les Mohicans de Babel (The Mohicans of Babel)
- 1929 – Lady Héléna (finished posthumously from Leroux's notes by Louis Latzarus) (English translation: Lady Helena; Or The Mysterious Lady (1931), tr. anonymous)
- 1937 – Les Fils de Balaoo (The Sons of Balaoo) (finished posthumously from Leroux's notes by Stanislas-André Steeman)
- 1977 – Ton Maître/Les Possédés du stupre (Your Master/Those Possessed by Lust) (posthumous)
- 1990 – Pouloulou/Le Secret de la boîte à thé (Ouh Là Là/The Secret of the Tea Box) (posthumous)

=== Short stories ===
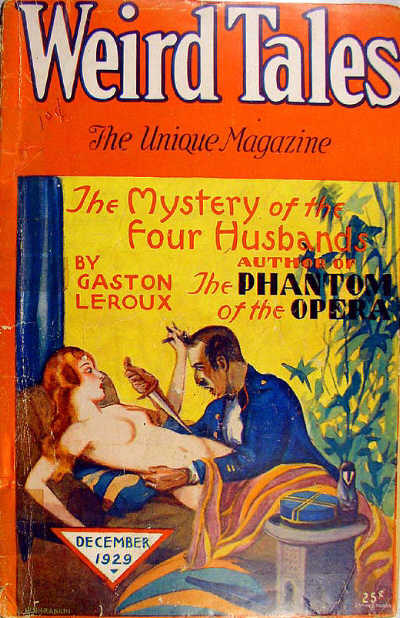
Gaston Leroux's "Not' Olympe" was translated into English as "The Mystery of the Four Husbands" and published in the December 1929 issue of Weird Tales.

- 1887 – "Le Petit Marchand de pommes de terre frites"
- 1902 – "Les Trois souhaits"
- 1907 – "Baïouchki Baïou"
- 1908 – "L'Homme qui a vu le diable" (English translation: "In Letters of Fire", in The Strand (June 1908), tr. anonymous)
- 1911 – "Une histoire épouvantable" (English translation: "A Terrible Tale", (1925), tr. Hannaford Bennet)
- 1912 – "La Hache d'or" (English translation, "The Gold Axe", (1925), tr. Hannaford Bennet)
- 1924 – "La Femme au collier de velours" (English translation: "The Woman with the Velvet Collar", in Weird Tales, (October 1929), tr. Mildred Gleason Prochet & Morris Bentinck)
- 1924 – "Le Noël du petit Vincent-Vincent" (English translation: "The Crime on Christmas Night", in Weird Tales, (December 1930), tr. Mildred Gleason Prochet & Morris Bentinck)
- 1924 – "Not' Olympe" (English translation: "The Mystery of the Four Husbands", in Weird Tales, (December 1929), tr. Mildred Gleason Prochet & Morris Bentinck)
- 1925 – "L'Auberge épouvantable" (English translation: "The Inn of Terror", in Weird Tales, (August 1929), tr. Mildred Gleason Prochet & Morris Bentinck)

=== Plays ===
- 1897 – Le-Turc-au-Mans (under the name Gaston Larive, co-author: Joseph Leroux)
- 1907 – La Maison des juges
- 1908 – Le Lys (co-author: Pierre Wolff)
- 1911 – L'Homme qui a vu le diable
- 1912 – Le Mystère de la chambre jaune
- 1913 – Alsace (co-author: Lucien Camille)
- 1923 – La Gare régulatrice (co-author: Yves Mirande)

== Filmography ==
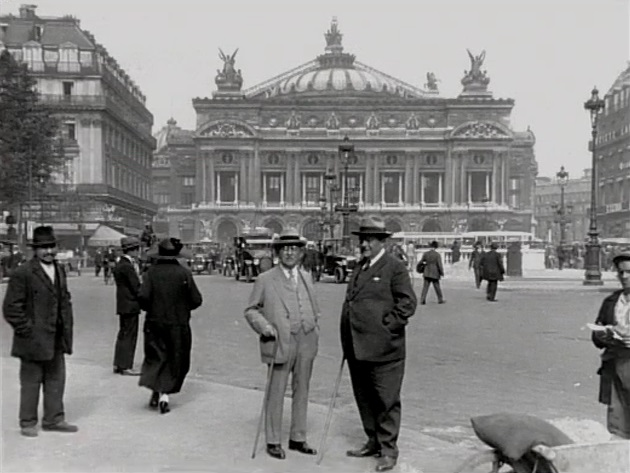
Leroux with Carl Laemmle at the Palais Garnier

  - Films based on The Phantom of the Opera
  - Films based on the Rouletabille novels
- Balaoo, directed by Victorin-Hippolyte Jasset (1913, short film, based on the novel Balaoo)
- Chéri-Bibi, directed by Charles Krauss (1914, short film, based on the novel Chéri-Bibi)
- Alsace, directed by Henri Pouctal (1916, based on the play Alsace)
- L'Homme qui revient de loin, directed by Gaston Ravel (1917, based on the novel L'Homme qui revient de loin)
- La Nouvelle aurore, directed by Édouard-Émile Violet (1919, serial with 16 episodes, based on the novel Nouvelles aventures de Chéri-Bibi)
- A halál után, directed by Alfréd Deésy (Hungary, 1920, based on the novel L'Homme qui revient de loin)
- The Lily, directed by Victor Schertzinger (1926, based on the play Le Lys)
- The Wizard, directed by Richard Rosson (1927, based on the novel Balaoo)
- The Phantom of Paris, directed by John S. Robertson (1931, based on the novel Chéri-Bibi and Cécily)
  - Cheri-Bibi, directed by Carlos F. Borcosque (1931), alternative Spanish-language version of The Phantom of Paris
- Compliments of Mister Flow, directed by Robert Siodmak (1936, based on the novel Mister Flow)
- Chéri-Bibi, directed by Léon Mathot (1938, based on the novel Chéri-Bibi)
- Dr. Renault's Secret, directed by Harry Lachman (1942, based on the novel Balaoo), uncredited
- The Perfume of the Lady in Black (1949)
- The Man Who Returns from Afar, directed by Jean Castanier (1950, based on the novel L'Homme qui revient de loin)
- Chéri-Bibi, directed by Marcello Pagliero (1955, based on the novel Chéri-Bibi and Cécily)
- Il profumo della signora in nero/ The Perfume of the Lady in Black (1974) Italian giallo
- Chéri-Bibi (1974–75, TV series, based on the Chéri-Bibi novels)
- La Poupée sanglante, directed by Marcel Cravenne (1976, miniseries, based on the novel La poupée sanglante and its sequel, La machine à assassiner)
- The Perfume of the Lady in Black (2005)

=== Screenwriter ===
- Tue la mort, directed by René Navarre (1920, serial with 12 episodes)
- Crossed Wires (film), directed by René Navarre (1921, serial with 12 episodes)
- Il était deux petits enfants, directed by Lino Manzoni (1922)

== Misattributions ==
The Gaston Leroux Bedside Companion, an anthology published in 1980 and edited by Peter Haining, as well as the Haining-edited The Real Opera Ghost and Other Tales By Gaston Leroux (Sutton, 1994), include a story attributed to Leroux entitled The Waxwork Museum. A foreword alleges that the translation by Alexander Peters first appeared in Fantasy Book in 1969 (but no original French publication date is given). Neither "Alexander Peters" nor "Fantasy Book" appear to exist, and the text of the story is, in fact, a word-for-word copy of the story Figures de cire by Andre de Lorde which was published as Waxworks in the 1933 anthology Terrors: A Collection of Uneasy Tales, edited (anonymously) by Charles Birkin. The confusion has sometimes caused Leroux to be erroneously credited with the stories from the 1933 film Mystery of the Wax Museum, the 1953 film House of Wax (both of which were based on a story by Charles S. Belden) or, particularly, the 1997 Italian film Wax Mask (for example, in Troy Howarth's Splintered Visions: Lucio Fulci and His Films). No such story by Leroux exists, though some confusion may have been the result of chapter IX in Leroux's novel La double vie de Théophraste Longuet, which is entitled, Le masque de cire (translated as The Wax Mask).
