= List of fictional literature featuring opera =

This is a list of literary fiction which feature opera in the plot. "Features" excludes fleeting mentions: for a literary work to be on this list opera must be a significant part of the plot, or, alternatively, provide significant context and backdrop.

Author	Title	Bibliographic information	Remarks
Katherine Addison	The Witness for the Dead	New York: Tom Doherty Associates, 2021 ISBN 978-0765387424	Sequel to The Goblin Emperor, the novel's mystery centers an opera singer and is set against the back drop of a working opera house.
Katherine Addison	The Grief of Stones	New York: Tom Doherty Associates, 2022 ISBN 9781250813893	Second book in the Cemeteries of Amalo series and third in The Goblin Emperor series, the novel features the returning character Pel-Thenhior, an opera-writer and director. Significant scenes are set within the opera house, detailing its performances and its operation.
Martha Albrand	Final Encore	New York: St. Martin's Press, 1978 ISBN 0312289413	Alternative title: Intermission
Kingsley Amis	The Alteration	London: Cape, 1976 ISBN 9780224013055	Inspired by Amis's hearing of the castrato Alessandro Moreschi; the lead character is a choir boy who undergoes castration
Oskar Paul Wilhelm Anwand	Die Primadonna Friedrichs des Grossen	Berlin: R. Bong, 1930	Fictionalized account of the love affair between Gertrud Elisabeth Mara and Frederick the Great
Honoré de Balzac	Gambara	New York: New York Review Books, 2001 ISBN 9780940322745	features an opera by its eponymous composer on the life of Mahomet, as well as a disquisition on Meyerbeer's opera Robert le diable
Eva Fanny Bernhardine Turk Baudissin, Grafin von	Wilhelmine Schröder-Devrient: der Schicksalsweg einer großen Künstlerin	Berlin: Drei Masken Verlag, 1937	
Malcolm Bradbury	Rates of Exchange	London: Secker & Warburg, 1983 ISBN 9780436065057	features the interminable Slakan national opera Vedontakal Vrop, by Z. Leblat
Malcolm Bradbury	Why come to Slaka?	London: Secker & Warburg, 1986 ISBN 9780436065064	again features the interminable Slakan national opera Vedontakal Vrop
Friedrich Bruckbräu	Mittheilungen aus den geheimen Memoiren einer deutschen Sängerin; later issued as Aus den Memoiren einer Sängerin (Pauline: Memoirs of a Singer; or Promiscuous Pauline; or, The Memoirs of a German Opera Singer)	Stuttgart: Gebrüder Franckh, 1829	Purported to be the memoir of the opera singer Wilhelmine Schröder-Devrient
Willa Cather	The Song of the Lark	Boston and New York, Houghton Mifflin, 1915	Has been described as the first "bildungsroman" with a female protagonist. Thea grows up in a frontier town on the Colorado Plains, studies piano in Chicago, is discovered to have a magnificent voice, is seduced and betrayed, goes to Germany and becomes a great Wagnerian soprano. All the characters somehow reunite at her Met debut in Lohengrin.
Alexander Chee	The Queen of the Night	Houghton Mifflin Harcourt, 2016 ISBN 9780618663026	A scrappy young girl escapes a traumatic childhood and reinvents herself as a diva soprano in Paris in the late 19th century. She eats dinner with the Verdis, flirts with a heldentenor and hides several secrets.
Francis Marion Crawford	Soprano: a Portrait (U.K. title; published in the U.S. as Fair Margaret: a Portrait)	New York, Macmillan, 1905	
Francis Marion Crawford	The Primadonna	New York, Macmillan, 1907	"A sequel to Fair Margaret"
Francis Marion Crawford	The Diva's Ruby	New York, Macmillan, 1908	"A sequel to Primadonna and Fair Margaret"
Mary Daheim	Bantam of the Opera	New York: Avon Books, 1993 ISBN 9780380769346	When obnoxious opera star Mario Pacetti and his entourage come to stay at her Hillside Manor and Mario is killed by poison, bed-and-breakfast hostess Judith McMonigle sets out to find the murderer and save her inn's reputation (publishers' summary)
Marcia Davenport	Of Lena Geyer	New York: Scribner, 1936	Lenzka Gyruzkova, a Czech immigrant to New York City, is protected and taught by an Italian vocal coach whom she had once met in Prague, goes back to Europe for lessons with Lilli Lehmann, and becomes a sensation in opera houses all over the world, singing Mozart and Verdi and Wagner—especially Wagner—with equal success. There are adventures off-stage, but she stays true to her singing. From 1968 to 1977, model and actress Nell Theobald obsessively stalked soprano Birgit Nilsson around the world, fashioned after elements in this book.
Michael Dibdin	Cosi Fan Tutti	London, Faber and Faber, 1997 ISBN 0571179207	Inspector Aurelio Zen uncovers a plot in Naples, where he is sidetracked by a woman who disapproves of her daughters' boyfriends and hopes to distract the boys with alternate girlfriends. The plot of Mozart's opera reworked.
Klemens Diez	Constanze – gewesene Witwe Mozart translated as: Constanze, formerly widow of Mozart: her unwritten memoir	Wien: Österreichische Verlagsanstalt, A. Schroll, 1982 ISBN 9783852020792	
Fortuné du Boisgobey	Le crime de l'opera translated as: The Crime of the Opera House	Paris, E. Plon et cie, 1880	
George du Maurier	Trilby	Published serially in Harper's Monthly in 1894; published in book form in 1895	
Diane Duane	The Book of Night with Moon	New York: Warner Books, 1997 ISBN 0446673021	One of the characters is Urruah, a dumpster-living, foodie tomcat with a yen for opera
Jane Duncan	My friends from Cairnton	New York: St. Martin's Press, 1964	
Dorothy Dunnett	Dolly and the Singing Bird, originally published as The Photogenic Soprano (1968), later as Rum Affair (1991))		
Erich Ebermayer	Die goldene Stimme	Hamburg: P. Zsolnay, 1958	
Anne Edwards	La Divina	New York: W. Morrow and Co., 1994 ISBN 9780688088361	Athena Varos rose to become a great opera diva during the 1930s and 40s, while her private life came to resemble one of her operas"
George Eliot	Daniel Deronda	New York: Oxford University Press, 1984 ISBN 9780198125570	
Dominique Fernandez	Porporino, ou, Les mystères de Naples translated as: Porporino, or The Secret of Naples	New York: Morrow, 1976 ISBN 9780688030582	
Kurt Arnold Findeisen	Flügel der Morgenröte	Berlin: Verlag der Nation, 1956	
Gustave Flaubert	Madame Bovary	New York: Viking, 2010 ISBN 9780670022076	First published in 1856
E. M. Forster	Where Angels Fear to Tread	New York: Vintage Books, 1992 ISBN 9780679736349	First published in 1920
Phil Foglio, Kaja Foglio	Agatha Heterodyne and the Chapel of Bones (Girl Genius Volume 8)	Airship Entertainment, 2009 ISBN 9781890856472	Volume 8 of the Girl Genius comic opens with author avatar Professoressa Foglio giving readers a 2-page recap of the first act of a fictional opera, or a story within a story: Portentius Reichenbach's "The Storm King". The opera is a highly dramatized account of historic events from the comic, providing background information on the current political situation. It also provides exposition on the activities of the ancestors of several main and secondary characters.
Jessie Fothergill	The First Violin	New York: H. Holt and Company, 1878	
Arnaldo Fraccaroli	Bellini	Milano: Arnoldo Mondadori, 1942	
Arnaldo Fraccaroli	Donizetti	Milano: Arnoldo Mondadori, 1945	
Don Freeman and Lydia Freeman	Pet of the Met	New York: Puffin Books, 1988 ISBN 9780140508925	First published in 1953; "A mouse who works as a page turner at the Metropolitan Opera House has only one enemy, a cat; but, during a performance of The Magic Flute, something magical happens to change their lives."
Nancy Freedman	Prima Donna	New York: William Morrow, 1981 ISBN 9780688037307	
Matthew Gallaway	The Metropolis Case	New York: Crown Publishers, 2010 ISBN 9780307463425	"From the smoky music halls of 1860s Paris to the tumbling skyscrapers of twenty-first-century New York, a sweeping tale of passion, music, and the human heart's yearning for connection. An unlikely quartet is bound together across centuries and continents by the strange and spectacular history of Richard Wagner's masterpiece opera Tristan and Isolde."
John Gano	Death at the Opera	London: Macmillan, 1995 ISBN 9780333629628	"A tour of the stately homes of England by the Floria Tosca Grand Opera Company is rudely interrupted by several murders, including the death of one of its sponsors. In view of the amorous intrigues and professional backstabbing, police have a hard time figuring out what's what."
Thomas Godfrey (ed)	Murder at the Opera: a collection of eleven murder mysteries	New York: Mysterious Press, 1989 ISBN 9780892963799	Includes: Addio, San Francisco by 'Albert Herring'; Swan song by Agatha Christie; A matter of mean elevation by O. Henry; Mom sings an aria by James Yaffe; The affair at the Semiramis Hotel by A.E.W. Mason; Death by enthusiasm by Hector Berlioz; The gun with wings by Rex Stout; Murder at the opera by Vincent Starrett; Melody in death by Baynard Kendrick; The Ptomaine canary by Helen Traubel; The spy who went to the opera by Edward D. Hoch
Elizabeth Caroline Grey	The Young Prima Donna: a romance of the opera	London: Bentley, 1840	
Elizabeth Caroline Grey	The Opera-Singers Wife	London: Charles H. Clarke, 1855	
Josef Haslinger	Opernball	Frankfurt am Main: S. Fischer, 1995; ISBN 9783596135912	
William James Henderson	The Soul of a Tenor: a Romance	New York: Henry Holt and Co., 1912	
Tom Holt	Expecting Someone Taller	New York: St. Martin's Press, 1987 ISBN 9780312014261	A meek young Englishman enters the world of Wagnerian myth when he inherits a helmet which allows him to understand the speech of birds and animals, and a ring which supplies him with endless amounts of gold and makes him the ruler of the world.
Tom Holt	Flying Dutch	New York: St. Martin's Press, 1992 ISBN 9780312069759	The actual Flying Dutchman (from Wagner's opera) and his crew accidentally drank an alchemists' elixir. The reason they can only come ashore every seven years is their stench is too great for land people to endure. But they must be found because they bought life insurance back in 1596, and the whole world owes them money. IF they die.
Ottokar Janetschek	Die Primadonna: ein Mozartroman	Wien: Kremayr & Scheriau, 1956	
Susan Kay	Phantom	New York: Delacorte Press, 1991 ISBN 9780385302968	A recreation of the life of the Phantom of the Opera unmasks the Paris Opera House inhabitant, telling how he was born disfigured and how he became a side-show freak, stonemason's apprentice, and eventually the masked man in search of love.
Gustav Kobbé	Signora, a child of the opera house	New York: R.H. Russell, 1902	
Zdenko von Kraft	Abend in Bayreuth	Berlin: Hyperion-Verlag, 1943	
Zdenko von Kraft	Welt und Wahn, Barrikaden, Liebestod, Wahnfried: ein Richard-Wagner-Roman	Heidelberg: Keysersche Verlagsbuchhandlung, 1954	
Max Kronberg	Feuerzauber: ein Lebens-Roman Richard Wagners	Leipzig: Koehler & Amelang, 1932	
Max Kronberg	Konig und Kunstler: Roman Konig Ludwigs II. und Richard Wagner	Leipzig: Otto Janke, 1937	
Max Kronberg	Der Sieg der Melodie: ein Puccini-Caruso-Roman	Leipzig: Koehler & Amelang, 1935	
Joachim Kupsch	Ein Ende in Dresden: ein Richard-Wagner-Roman	Berlin: Henschel, 1964	
Lilian Lee (Pi-hua Li)	Farewell To My Concubine (Pa-wang pieh Chi)	New York: William Morrow, 1993 ISBN 9780688120207	Farewell to My Concubine is a story of jealousy and passion set against the exhilarating spectacle of the Peking opera. One of the most unusual epic romances of all time, the novel moves swiftly from the decadent glamour of 1930s China through the horrors of the Japanese occupation right up to Hong Kong in the 1980s. This riveting and sensual story could only have come from the pen of Lilian Lee, one of the Chinese reading world's most beloved and best-selling authors....
Donna Leon	Death at La Fenice	New York: HarperCollins Publishers, 1992 ISBN 9780060168711	
Gaston Leroux	Le Fantôme de l'Opéra translated as The Phantom of the Opera	Paris, P. Lafitte & cie, 1910	
Charlotte MacLeod	The Plain Old Man	Garden City, N.Y.: Published for the Crime Club by Doubleday, 1985 ISBN 9780385230032	When she gets involved in her Aunt Emma's production of "The Sorcerer" by Gilbert and Sullivan, Sarah Kelling Bittersohn doesn't expect it to lead to art theft and murder.
Klaus Mann	Vergittertes Fenster: Novelle um den Tod des Königs Ludwig II. von Bayern	Amsterdam: Querido verlag n.v., 1937	
Thomas Mann	Tristan		
Thomas Mann	Wälsungenblut (The Blood of the Wälsungs)	München: Phantasus-Verlag, 1921	
Queena Mario	Murder in the Opera House	New York: E.P. Dutton & Co., 1934	
Ngaio Marsh	Photo Finish	Boston: Little, Brown, 1980 ISBN 9780316546805	Chief Superintendent Roderick Alleyn, C.I.D., Scotland Yard, must identify "Strix" (a dangerous shutterbug) among the assemblage of luminaries gathered at the New Zealand hideaway of the opera star La Sommita's wealthy patron.
James McCourt	Mawrdew Czgowchwz	New York: Farrar, Straus and Giroux, 1975 ISBN 9780374204617	"Diva Mawrdew Czgowchwz bursts like the most brilliant of comets onto the international opera scene, only to confront the deadly malice and black magic of her rivals.
Ethan Mordden	The Venice Adriana	New York: St. Martin's Press, 1998 ISBN 9780312182021	American Mark Trigger travels to 1960s Venice to write a biography of Adriana Grafanas, a famous opera singer, and is drawn into her world—a film director courts her for a movie, a princess tries to steal her man. In the process Trigger discovers his passion—for men.
Hans Nowak and Georg Zivier	Verdi, oder Die Macht des Schicksals	Berlin, Keil Verlag, 1938	Later issued as Die Macht des Schicksals, ein Verdi-Roman
Ann Patchett	Bel Canto	New York: Perennial, HarperCollins, 2001 ISBN 0060934417	Somewhere in South America, at the home of the country's vice president, a lavish birthday party is being held in honor of a visiting Japanese businessman. Roxanne Coss, opera's most revered soprano, has mesmerized the international guests with her singing. It is a perfect evening, until the lights go out. This book was adapted into an opera that had its premiere in Chicago in 2015.
Barbara Paul	A Cadenza for Caruso	New York: St. Martin's Press, 1984 ISBN 9780312113285	Murder stalks the Met. Puccini has been black-mailed and Toscanini is acting strangely. Can Enrico Caruso solve the mystery?
Ellis Peters	The House of Green Turf	London: Published for the Crime Club by Collins, 1969 ISBN 9780002313032	A famous singer wakes up in hospital after a car crash, haunted by the certainty that she has been responsible for a death at some time in the past. She hires a private investigator, who launches a hunt across Europe with the trail leading to Felse's wife, Bunty.
Terry Pratchett	Maskerade	London: Victor Gollancz, 1995 ISBN 0575058080	There are strange goings-on at the Opera House in Ankh-Morpork, with murders you can hum, in this 18th Discworld novel.
Henry Handel Richardson	The Young Cosima, a novel	New York: W. W. Norton, 1939	Twelve years in the life of the daughter of Franz Liszt (Cosima Wagner).
Hermann Richter	Das wilde Herz: Lebensroman der Wilhelmine Schröder-Devrient	Leipzig: Koehler & Amelang, 1927	
Blanche Roosevelt	Stage-struck; or, She would be an opera-singer	New York: Fords, Howard, & Hulbert; London, Sampson Low & Co., 1884	
Kate Ross	The Devil in Music	New York: Viking, 1997 ISBN 9780670863594	The sleuthing 19th century English dandy, Julian Kestrel, is in Milan searching for the killer of a famous marquis. The marquis was a patron of the opera and the probe takes place against the background of goings-on at La Scala.
Pitts Sanborn	Prima Donna, a novel of the opera	New York: Longmans, Green, 1929	
Phillip Scott	One Dead Diva	Los Angeles: Alyson Books, 1995 ISBN 9781555837594	Marc, a 50-ish accident-prone opera queen, and Paul, a ditsy chorus boy addicted to dance parties, are an odd pairing as friends. As detectives they are even more unlikely. Still, they decide to investigate the mysterious death of Sydney's hottest new operatic talent, Jennifer Burke—a death the authorities have deemed a suicide. Hot on the trail of clues that lead to all the wrong answers, our energetically inefficient sleuths investigate a slew of highly suspicious characters—including a sharp-tongued music critic, a past-it prima donna, and a formidable drag artiste—before accidentally stumbling over the truth.
Albéric Second	Les petits mystères de l'Opera	Paris: G. Kugelmann, 1844	
Alphons Silbermann	Das imaginäre Tagebuch des Herrn Jacques Offenbach	Berlin: Bote & Bock, 1960	
Susannah Stacey	A Knife At The Opera	New York: Summit Books, 1988 ISBN 9780671657802	Backstage at the Turnbridge Wells girls' school production of The Beggar's Opera, all was bedlam. Miss Claire Fairlie, the pretty English teacher, was found with a knife plunged into her back. Superintendent Robert Bone was in the audience, and as he dug deeper in the case, he discovered there was a lot more to Miss Fairlie than met the eye.
Frank Thiess	Caruso: Roman einer Stimme	Hamburg: Krüger, 1946	
Leo Tolstoy	War and Peace	New York: T.Y. Crowell & Co., 1889	First published in 1869
Leo Tolstoy	Anna Karenina	New York: T.Y. Crowell & Co., 1886	First published in 1878. A performance of Lucia di Lammermoor is a pivotal event
Helen Traubel	The Metropolitan Opera Murders	New York: Simon and Schuster, 1951	
Roland Vernon	The Maestro's Voice	London: Black Swan, 2010 ISBN 0552775525	New York: Rocco Campobello, the great tenor–-one of the most revered entertainers in the world–-collapses on stage. He emerges from this brush with death a changed man: a fallen, but enlightened colossus.
Franz Werfel	Verdi. Roman der Oper (Verdi: A Novel of the Opera	Berlin: Paul Zsolnay, 1924	Verdi goes to Venice during Carnival of 1882/83, only to discover the city haunted by his great rival, Wagner. Will they confront one another?
