= Adaptations of The Phantom of the Opera =

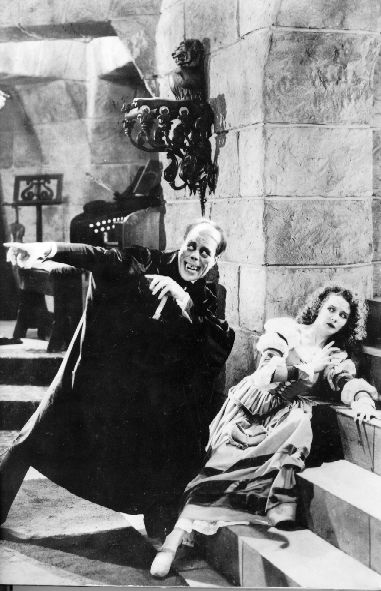
Lon Chaney and Mary Philbin in the 1925 silent film adaptation

There have been many literary and dramatic works based on Gaston Leroux's 1910 novel The Phantom of the Opera, ranging from stage musicals to films to children's books. Some well known stage and screen adaptations of the novel are the 1925 film and the Andrew Lloyd Webber musical (see The Phantom of the Opera (1986 musical)); Susan Kay's 1990 Phantom is one of the best known novels and includes in-depth study of the title character's life and experiences.

== Film ==
Claude Rains portraying Erique Claudin, the Phantom, in Universal's 1943 version of Phantom of the Opera. Picture with Susanna Foster (Christine DuBois).

- Das Gespenst im Opernhaus or Das Phantom der Oper (1916): Featuring the Swedish actor Nils Olaf Chrisander (1884–1947) and the Norwegian actress Aud Egede-Nissen (1893–1974, aka Aud Egede Richter). Now a lost film, it is only known to have existed because of references to it in other media.
- The Phantom of the Opera (1925): Featuring Lon Chaney, Norman Kerry and Mary Philbin. For this classic silent film Universal Pictures created a faithful replica of the Paris Opera House as a setting. The film was reissued in 1929 with sound effects, music and some reshot dialogue sequences (but none with Chaney). The scene in which Erik plays the organ and Christine creeps up behind him to snatch his mask off is often cited by critics and connoisseurs of film art as one of the most memorable moments in the history of all film. The makeup of Lon Chaney was so disfiguring that the camera operator lost focus while shooting the sequence, and theaters were urged to have smelling salts on hand in case ladies in the audience fainted in horror.
- Spooks (1930): An Oswald the Lucky Rabbit cartoon.
- Song at Midnight (夜半歌聲; Ye ban ge sheng) (1937): Featuring Gu Menghe and Hu Ping, directed by Ma-Xu Weibang. This classic from mainland China marks the first feature film talkie adaptation and was the first to feature the phantom becoming intentionally disfigured by acid.
- Phantom of the Opera (1943): Featuring Claude Rains as the Phantom and the singer Susanna Foster as Christine. This film reused the same Paris Opera studio set as the original silent film and once again features the spectacular scene in which the Phantom causes the chandelier to crash down on the heads of the audience. In this version, however, horror is mostly downplayed in favour of grand operatic spectacle. The Phantom's anger is sparked by his belief that the credit for his musical compositions is being stolen by the music publisher. The Phantom's facial disfigurement is also caused by having had acid thrown in his face much like in Song at Midnight, rather than having been born disfigured as in Leroux's original story. This accidental disfigurement became common, and copied in later film versions.
- El Fantasma de la Opereta (1959): Featuring German Valdés (Tin Tan) and Pedro D'Aguillón. Aldo (Tin-Tan) and his girlfriend reopen an abandoned opera house, but find out that the place is inhabited by a group of Phantoms wearing the Claude Rains' 1943 "Phantom of the Opera" costume.
- The Phantom of the Opera (1962): Hammer Horror version featuring Herbert Lom and Heather Sears. This version has the Phantom playing the Toccata and Fugue in D Minor by Johann Sebastian Bach on the organ - which has become a cultural trope indicating tragic horror. Set in London instead of Paris, the plot is very similar to the 1943 Claude Rains version, with the Phantom being prodded into activity because his own masterpiece, an opera about Joan of Arc, is being mounted in that opera house and credited to an unscrupulous aristocrat.
- The Mid-Nightmare, Part One (1962) and Part Two (1963) (夜半歌声-上集 Ye ban ge sheng - shang ji and 下集 xia ji): Remake of the 1937 Chinese film, this time featuring Zhao Lei and Betty Loh Ti.
- Il mostro dell'opera or The Vampire of the Opera (1964): Featuring Giuseppe Addobbati.
- Murders in the Rue Morgue (1971): A series of unexplained murders takes place at a Grand Guignol-type theatre where the players have suddenly become real-life victims. A loose adaptation of Edgar Allan Poe's story "The Murders in the Rue Morgue", but at times more resembling The Phantom of the Opera.
- Wicked, Wicked (1973): Writer/director Richard L. Bare's split-screen horror-comedy which recycles the plot and utilizes a score composed for the 1925 film.
- Phantom of the Paradise (1974): Also called The Phantom of the Fillmore; a rock musical directed by Brian De Palma. The film is a parody of multiple films and pop culture references.
- Song at Midnight (1985): Remake of the 1937 Chinese film of the same name.
- The Phantom of the Opera (1988): Featuring Aiden Grennell: Animated film that is mostly faithful to the original story.
- The Phantom of the Ritz (1988): Featuring Joshua Sussman.
- The Phantom of the Opera (1989): Directed by Dwight H. Little, featuring Robert Englund and Jill Schoelen. This is a rather sadistic and gory version of the story, though in this respect it resembles the original novel more than some more romantic versions. There is a Faustian motif throughout and the film features extracts from Gounod's opera Faust - as in the original novel. In this version (which, like the 1962 Hammer version, is set in London), the Phantom was a handsome young man who sold his soul to the Devil in return for being loved for his music - his disfigurement is the Devil's way of making sure he is loved for no other reason. An additional innovation is that, instead of putting on masks, the Phantom stitches his disguises with thread and needle onto his skin.
- Phantom of the Mall: Eric's Revenge (1989): Featuring Derek Rydall.
- The Phantom of the Opera (1991): Featuring David Staller and Elizabeth Walsh. A videotaped film of a stage production in Florida.
- O Fantasma da Ópera (1991): Featuring Geiso Amadeu.
- The Chipmunks - Phantom Of The Rock Opera (1991)
- The Phantom Lover (1995): A third remake of the 1937 film, by Hong Kong director Ronny Yu and featuring Leslie Cheung. Title in Chinese is the same as the other versions.
- Il Fantasma dell'Opera (1998): Directed by Dario Argento, featuring Julian Sands and Asia Argento, in which Julian Sands is a good-looking man whose animus comes from being abandoned as a baby and raised by the numberless rats in the subterranean levels of the opera house; he also, somehow, has developed telepathic abilities. He kills off various people who, in his opinion, spoil the wonderfulness of the opera house.
- Phantom of the Megaplex (2000): a Disney Channel Original Movie.
- A version of the character appears in the 2003 film adaptation of The League of Extraordinary Gentlemen as a terrorist named The Fantom, who is not really the Opera ghost although he uses his motif.
- Joel Schumacher's The Phantom of the Opera (2004): Adaptation of the Andrew Lloyd Webber and Charles Hart musical, starring Gerard Butler, Patrick Wilson and Emmy Rossum.
- Angel of Music (2009): A low-budget independent film directed by John Woosley. The film is a semi-sequel to the original Leroux novel, revolving around a reporter's search for The Phantom's rumoured long-lost child.
- Erik: Portrait of a Living Corpse (2010): a low-budget, student film adaptation
- The Phantom of the Opera at the Royal Albert Hall (2011): Adaptation of the Andrew Lloyd Webber and Charles Hart musical, starring Ramin Karimloo, Hadley Fraser and Sierra Boggess.
- A Monster in Paris (2011): French film very loosely based on Gaston Leroux's novel.
- Phantom of the Grindhouse (2013): Written and directed by Chris Seaver.
- The Phantom of the Opera (2014): A low-budget independent film directed by and starring Anthony Mann.
- Phantom of the Theatre (2016): Killed in a fire 13 years earlier, vengeful spirits of a performance troupe seek new victims as the playhouse reopens.
- On June 6, 2017, Alex Kurtzman announced a new Phantom of the Opera film as part of Universal's Dark Universe. However, after Kurtzman's departure, the project is most likely not happening.
- On September 6, 2024, a YA focused adaptation of the story, simply titled Phantom, was announced to be in development for Disney+. Kenny Ortega is set to direct.
- On June 23, 2025, Andrew Lloyd Webber revealed that a remake of the 2004 film adaptation of the musical is in early development.
- On August 13, 2025, it was announced that Qubic Pictures and LW Entertainment would adapt the Andrew Lloyd Webber musical into an Anime.
- Ben Fitton's Phantom of the Opera (2025): A low-budget independent film directed by Ben Fitton.

The following films bear no relation to the Leroux novel other than the title:

- El Fantasma de la Opereta (1954): Featuring Gogó Andreu and Tono Andreu.
- Phantom of the Horse Opera (1961): A Woody Woodpecker cartoon.
- Phantom of the Horse Opera (1962): An episode of the Beany and Cecil cartoon television series.

== Television ==
- El Fantasma de la Ópera (1954): Argentine miniseries featuring Raissa Bignardi.
- El Fantasma de la Ópera (1960): Argentine miniseries featuring Narciso Ibáñez Menta. Widely remembered; part of a series "Masterworks of Terror".
- The Phantom of What Opera? (1971): an episode from Rod Serling's Night Gallery.
- The Phantom of Hollywood (1974): TV Movie featuring Jack Cassidy as an old-time movie star who had been disfigured by an accident and now haunts the backlot of a condemned Hollywood studio.
- The Howdy Doody Show: Phantom of the Doody-O Studio (1976): A multipart storyline where a “Phantom” causes trouble at the Doodyville studio leading to adventures with the main cast and child audience as they uncover the Phantom’s true identity.
- The Phantom of the Opera (1983): TV Movie featuring Maximilian Schell, Michael York, and Jane Seymour.
- The Phantom of the Opera (1990): Two-part miniseries based on the Yeston-Kopit musical (see below in ""Stage"), featuring Charles Dance as the Phantom/Erik and Teri Polo as Christine.
- "Pantin' at the Opera" (1995): an episode of the PBS TV series, Wishbone.
- El fantasma de la Ópera (1999): an episode of Catalan animated series, The Triplets.
- Song at Midnight (2005): Television adaptation of the 1937 Chinese film by Ma-Xu Weibang, which in turn is a loose adaptation of Leroux's novel.

== Stage ==
- The Phantom of the Opera (1975) by David Giles.
- "El Fantasma de la Opera" ("The Phantom of the Opera", 1976) Mexican musical adapted by Raúl Astor from the Gaston Leroux's book with music and lyrics by Mexican composer Nacho Méndez. It was staged at Teatro de los Insurgentes in Mexico City where it ran for almost 400 performances and showcased for Mexican TV.
- Phantom of the Opera (1976/1984): Musical by Ken Hill, with lyrics set to music by Gounod, Offenbach, Verdi, and others.
- Phantom of the Opera: A New Victorian Thriller (1979) by Gene Traylor.
- The Phantom of the Opera: Or the Passage of Christine (1986) with book by Kathleen Masterson and music by David Bishop. Commissioned by and premiered at Capital Repertory Theatre in Albany, NY April 19-May 18, 1986.
- The Phantom of the Opera (1986): Musical composed by Andrew Lloyd Webber with lyrics by Charles Hart and Richard Stilgoe. This musical was adapted into a film in 2004 directed by Joel Schumacher. A 25th anniversary staging of the musical was also filmed. (See above).
- The Phantom of the Opera (a.k.a. The American Phantom of the Opera: A Love Story) (1987) by Helen Grigal (book and lyrics) and Dr. Walter Anderson (music) Produced by the Oregon Ridge Dinner Theater in cooperation with the Baltimore Actor's Theater. Director/Choreographer: Helen Grigal.
- The Pinchpenny Phantom of the Opera: An Affordable Musical Comedy (1988) by Dave Reiser and Jack Sharkey.
- The Phantom of the Opera: The Play (1988–1989) by John Kenley and Robert Thomas Noll, music by David Gooding and Charles Gounod.
- Phantom of the Opera (1990) with book by Bruce Falstein and music by Lawrence Rosen and Paul Shierhorn.
- Phantom (1991) book by David H. Bell, music by Tom Sivak.
- Phantom (1991): Musical by Maury Yeston (music and lyrics) and Arthur Kopit (text).
- Phantom of the Op'ry: A Melodrama with Music (1991), book by Tom Kelly, music by Gerald V. Castle and lyrics by Michael C. Vigilant.
- Phantom of the Soap Opera (1992), Book and lyrics by Craig Sodaro, music by Randy Villars, Eldridge Publishing Co.
- "Phantom of the Music Room" (1992) by Janet Gardner: A children's musical play featuring a loosely adapted storyline with lyrics set to assorted classical and historical tunes.
- The Phantom of the Opera (1992), book and lyrics by Joseph Robinette and music by Robert Chauls.
- Phantom of the Opera (1992) with book by Michael Tilford and music and lyrics by Tom Alonso.
- The Phantom of the Opera on Ice (1995) with narration and lyrics by Roberto Danova, Tony Mercer, Kathy Dooley and Stephen Lee Garden. Music composed and arranged by Roberto Danova.(A DVD was released in 2006 featuring the Russian Ice Stars, Roberto Danova, Mungo Jerry Johnny Logan, Susannah Glanville, Victor Michael and Sue Quin).
- Phantom der Oper (1997) with music by Arndt Gerber and text by Paul Wilhelm.
- Phantom of the Opera: Original Family Musical (1998) with book by Rob Barron and music, lyrics and orchestrantion by David Spencer.
- Phantom: Based on the Novel by Gaston Leroux (1998) A 2 Act Play with Musical Performances from Gounod's Faust & Romeo & Juliet. Written & Directed by Jack Danini.
- Phantom of the NorShor (2005).
- Phantom: The Las Vegas Spectacular reconceived by Andrew Lloyd Webber and Hal Prince at The Venetian, Las Vegas (2006).
- The Phantom of the Opera ballet by the Atlantic Ballet Theatre of Canada (2006)
- The Panto of the Opera by Stuart Ardern (2007) an English Pantomime treatment.
- Gaston Leroux's Phantom of the Opera by Joseph Traynor (2007).
- Love Never Dies (musical) (2009), sequel by Andrew Lloyd Webber.
- The Angel of the Opera Phantom of the Opera-like musical, set in 1860, about a violinist, and an angel who appears in her dreams and teaches her to sing opera. (2009?)
- Phantom of the Opera A New Musical, music by Michael Sgouros, with Playwright/Director Brenda Bell (opened April 30, 2010 at The Players Theatre in New York City)
- Le Fantôme de l'Opéra (2023) ballet by Shanghai Ballet, with music by Carl Davis and choreography by Derek Deane. Although based Gaston Leroux's 1911 novel, the ballet made major revisions to the plot, with Christine and Raoul belonging to the corps de ballet.
- Masquerade (2025) Production by Diane Paulus and Randy Weiner, a retelling of the 1986 musical. Instead of being seated, the audience is led through an immersive experience as the musical progresses.

== Radio ==
- The Phantom of the Opera (1943): The Lux Radio Broadcast of 1943, Original airdate - September 13, 1943. Based on the 1943 film Phantom of the Opera starring Claude Rains, featuring Basil Rathbone as The Phantom and Nelson Eddy and Susanna Foster recreating their film roles. Produced and hosted by Cecil B. DeMille.
- The Phantom of the Opera (1975): CBS Radio Mystery Theater, Original airdate - April 28, 1975. Featuring Court Benson and Gordon Gould. Directed by Himan Brown.
- The Phantom of the Opera (2001): Original airdate - June 5, 2001. Featuring Composer/Actress Winifred Phillips and Producer/Story Adaptation/Host Winnie Waldron. From the award-winning Radio Tales series, produced by Generations Productions LLC for National Public Radio and is rebroadcast via XM Satellite Radio.
- The Phantom of the Opera (2007): Original airdate - November 30, 2007 to December 21, 2007, on BBC7. Featuring Anna Massey, Peter Guinness, Helen Goldwyn, Alexander Siddig and James D’Arcy. The four-part dramatization is the first to feature the original operatic sequences described in the novel, recorded and orchestrated by composer Tim Sutton. Written and directed by Barnaby Edwards for Big Finish Productions.
- The Ghost in the Opera House (2023) by “Zariya Hollow: A Horror Anthology Podcast”. Original airdate - December 23, 2023 to January 19, 2025. A five-part audio drama adaption based on the original version of the story first published in serial form in Le Gaulois.

== Literature ==
- The Phantom of the Opera (1976) by David Bischoff
- City Life (1978) by Donald Barthelme - Contains the short story The Phantom of the Opera's Friend
- Phantom of the Opera (Monsters series) (1987) by Ian Thorne - Novelization of the 1943 movie with Claude Rains
- Classic Tales of Horror (A Pull-the-Tab Pop-Up Book) (1988) by Terry Oakes (Illustrator)
- Phantom of the Soap Opera (1988) by Judi Miller. Published by Dell Pub Co
- The Phantom of the Opera: Pop-Up Book (1988) by Frank Van Der Meer, Arum Press
- Phantoms (1989) by Martin and Rosalind Greenberg.
- Night Magic (1989) by Charlotte Vale Allen - a romance novel retelling of the Phantom story in more modern times.
- Phantom (1990) by Susan Kay - a retelling of the Phantom's life.
- Night of the Phantom (1992) by Anne Stuart.
- Genevieve Undead, Part One: Stage Blood (1993) by Jack Yeovil - A version of the story set in the world of Warhammer Fantasy.
- The Canary Trainer (1993) by Nicholas Meyer - a Sherlock Holmes novel which re-interprets Leroux's plot.
- Phantom of Chicago (1993) by Lori Herter. Published in Shadows '93 by Silhoutette.
- Behind the Phantom's Mask (1993) by Roger Ebert.
- The Angel of the Opera (1994) by Sam Siciliano - Sherlock Holmes and his cousin meet the Phantom.
- Maskerade (1995) by Terry Pratchett - a Discworld novel that parodies the story.
- Beauty and the Opera or the Phantom Beast a short story by Suzy McKee Charnas. Published in Asimov’s Science Fiction Magazine, March 1996. Reprinted in Modern Classics of Fantasy (1997) by St. Martin's Press (editor: Gardner Dozois), again in Music of the Night (2001) by Electricstory, and in Stagestruck Vampires and Other Phantasms (2004) this short story offers an alternate ending, with Christine staying with the Phantom for five years.
- Musikens Ängel (1998) by Eva Gullberg. Published by Författarhuset.
- The Phantom of Manhattan (1999) by Frederick Forsyth - a sequel to the Lloyd Webber musical (not to the original novel).
- Le Journal Intime du Fantôme de l'Opera (2000) by Marion Dumond-Gros.
- After Twilight (2001) by Amanda Ashley, Christine Feehan and Ronda Thompson.
- Mystery at the Opera House (2002) by Brigitta D'Arcy
- Angel of Music (2002) by D.M. Bernadette - a sequel to "all Phantom adaptations"
- Journey of the Mask (2002) by Nancy Hill Pettengill - a sequel to Leroux's original novel
- The Phantom of Paris (2003) by Gwenith M. Vehlow
- Fantômes d'Opéra (2004) by Alain Germain.
- Tales of the Shadowmen 1: The Modern Babylon (2005) edited by Jean-Marc Lofficier & Randy Lofficier. Published by Hollywood Comics
- Angel of Music: Tales of the Phantom (2005) by Carrie Hernández
- Tales of the Shadowmen 2: Gentlemen of the Night (2006) edited by Jean-Marc Lofficier & Randy Lofficier. Published by Black Coat Press
- Unmasqued: An Erotic Novel of The Phantom of The Opera (2007) by Colette Gale
- The Return of the Phantom (2007) by Etienne de Mendes. Book one of a series.
- Life After Phantom: Opera Erotica (2008) by Samantha (pseudonym) - Sequel that takes place when the Phantom is driven from the Opera House; based loosely on characters created by Gaston Leroux.
- "Madrigal: A novel of Gaston Leroux's The Phantom of the Opera" (2008) by Jennifer Linforth. Book one of a trilogy
- Letters to Erik: The Ghost's Love Story (2008) by An Wallace
- The Season of the Witch (2008) by Etienne de Mendes. Book two of a series.
- "The Sultan's Favorite" (2009) by Anne Burnside. Published by iUniverse.
- "Midnight Secrets" (2009) By Lisa Rose Olick
- The Phantom of Valletta (2009) by Vicki Hopkins Continuation of Gaston Leroux's Phantom
- The Tale of the Bloodline (2010) by Etienne de Mendes. Book three of a series.
- The Disciples of the Night (2012) by Etienne de Mendes. Book four of a series.
- The Phantom of the Palace (2012) by Jeff Martinez
- Master of Illusion—Book One (2013) by Anne Rouen. Book one of a series. Winner of the 2014 Global Ebook Awards Silver Medal for Historical Literature Fiction (Modern).
- Phantom Phantasia: Poetry for the Phantom of the Opera Phan (2014) Published by Batalha Publishers
- Master of Illusion—Book Two (2014) by Anne Rouen. Book two of a series.
- Of Metal and Wishes (2014) by Sarah Fine. Published by Margaret K. McElderry Books
- For Love of the Phantom (2015) by Davyne DeSye. Book one of the Phantom Rising series. Sequel to Gaston Leroux's Phantom of the Opera. Published by Illuminus Publishing, LLC.
- Skeletons in the Closet (2016) by Davyne DeSye. Book two of the Phantom Rising series. Published by Illuminus Publishing, LLC.
- Black Paper Mask (2016) by Lauren Gattos. A feminist revision of Gaston Leroux's original novel.
- Phantom: The Immortal (2016) by Mitzi Szereto and Ashley Lister is a contemporary erotic sequel that places the apparently immortal Phantom in present-day Paris, where he believes he has once again found his "Christine."
- Phantom Rising (2020) by Davyne DeSye. Book three of the Phantom Rising series. Prequel to Gaston Leroux's Phantom of the Opera. Published by Illuminus Publishing, LLC.
- Phantom Heart (2021) by Kelly Creagh
- Angel's Mask (2023) by Jessica Mason. Book one in the Phantom Saga series, a gothic romance reinvention of Leroux's original.
- The Opera Ghost (2024) by Jessica Olenski. The first in the POTO Rewritten series.
- Through the Eyes of the Opera Ghost (2025) by Davyne DeSye. Retelling of Gaston Leroux's Phantom of the Opera from the Phantom's viewpoint. Published by Illuminus Publishing, LLC.

=== Children's literature ===
- The Phantom Cat of the Opera (2001) by David Wood. Published by Watson-Guptill Publications. Illustrated by Peters Day
- The Phantom of the Post Office by Kate Klise for her 43 Old Cemetery Road series. Illustrated by M. Sarah Klise.
- Phantoms Don't Drive Sports Cars (1998) (The Adventures of the Bailey School Kids) by Debbie Dadey and Marcia Thornton Jones. Published by Scholastic Paperbacks
- Bantam of the Opera (1997) by Mary Jane Auch. Published by Holiday House
- Phantom of the Auditorium (1995) by R. L. Stine, about a school being haunted by a boy who was supposed to play an Erik-type figure in a production of "The Phantom" but died on opening night.
- Phantom of the Muppet Theater (1991) by Ellen Weiss, Manhar Chauhan (Illustrator)
- The Peeping Duck Gang investigates the case of the Phantom of the Opera (1990) by Keith Brumpton.
- Babar: The Phantom (1990) by Rh Value Publishing
- The Phantom of the Opera (1989) by Peter F. Neumeyer. Published by Gibbs Smith. Illustrations by Don Weller.
- The Phantom of the Opera by Kate McMullan. Published by Step-Up Classic Chillers. Illustrations by Paul Jennis.
- The Phantom of the Opera by Jennifer Bassett. Published by Oxford Bookworm's Library.
- In Bruce Coville's book "Monster of the Year", a tall masked Phantom-esque character appears briefly, suggesting that for good publicity, the others try for a show on Broadway. This suggestion is vetoed by the main character's mother, saying it takes years for such a thing to happen.
- The Phantom of her dreams (1999) by Lela Duspara about a girl that is haunted by a musician that tries to teach her how to love, through a shared gift, music.
- Frankenstein Makes a Sandwich (2010) by Adam Rex contains five pages listing the Phantom's frustration with catchy popular tunes: "The Phantom of the Opera can't get "It's a Small World" Out of His Head", "The Phantom of the Opera still can't get "It's a Small World" Out of His Head", "If the Phantom of the Opera can't get "Pop goes the weasel" out of his head, he's going to freak out" "Now the Phantom of the Opera can't get "The girl from Ipanema" out of his head" and "The Phantom of the Opera is considering giving up music and doing his haunting somewhere else"
- RoseBlood (2017) by A.G. Howard, published by Amulet Books, is a modern set sequel/retelling with strong fantasy elements.
- Muppets Meet The Classics: The Phantom of the Opera (2017) by Erik Forrest Jackson (also credited to Leroux) inserts Muppet characters into the original novel.

=== Comics ===
- Le Fantôme de l'Opéra - Requiem Mask (2007) by Iron-Gibbet Studios.
- The Trap-door Maker Three volumes. (2006) by Pete Bregman. Published by Treehouse - story revolves around Erik's time in Persia.
- Le Fantôme de l'Opéra (2005), a one-shot manga by Harumo Sanazaki. Published in Comic BIRZ.
- The Opera House Murders (2003) story by Yozaburo Kanari and art by Fumiya Sato. In "The Kindaichi Case Files" series. Published by TokyoPop.
- Edgar Rice Burroughs' Tarzan #11 and #12 Le Monstre (1997) published by Dark Horse Comics - A Phantom of the Opera/Tarzan crossover.
- Batman: Masque (1997) by Mike Grell with Andre Khromov. Published by DC Comics.
- Le Fantôme de l'Opéra Volume 1 of the Joseph Rouletabille series. Story by André-Paul Duchateau and drawings by Bernard-C. Swysen. Published by Claude Lefrancq in 1989 and Soleil in 2001. This version Rouletabille is combined with Raoul.
- Le Trésor du Fantôme de l'Opéra (The Treasure of the Phantom of the Opera) Volume 7 of the Joseph Rouletabille series. Story by André-Paul Duchateau and drawings by Bernard-C. Swysen. Published by Claude Lefrancq in 1996 and Soleil in 2001.
- Le Fantôme de l'Opéra Volume 3 of the Une aventure de Rouletabille series. Story by Jean-Charles Gaudin and drawing by Christophe Picaud. This version Rouletabille took an interview on The elderly Persian on his memory on whole past.
- Le Masque (1994) by Narumo Kakinochi. In two volumes, it is more inspired than based on the novel of Gaston Leroux.
- Le Fantôme de l'Opéra (1989) by JET. Published by Asuka Comics DX - Japanese, mixes elements from Leroux, Andrew L. Webber, and Lon Chaney.
- Le Fantome de l'Opera by Toshihiro Hirano. Two volumes.
- Sherlock Holmes: Adventure of the Opera Ghost Two volumes. (1994) by Steven P. Jones, art by Aldin Baroza, and cover art by Guy Davis. In black&white. Published by Caliber Press.
- Phantom of the Opera (1991) by Mitchell Perkins and Wanda Daughton (and Vickie Williams). Published by Innovation Publishing.
- The Phantom is Monster in My Pocket #38. He is draughted by evil monster leader Warlock but sides with Vampire and the good monsters. He becomes less inclined to wear his mask as the series go on after being exposed to MTV.
- The Phantom of the Opera (1988) published by Eternity Comics - Based on Gaston Leroux's novel.
- The Phantom of the Opera: A Graphic Novel by Barry Leroux. Published by Bill Barry Enterprises.
- The Phantom Stranger (1973) no. 23 published by DC Comics.
- The Phantom of Notre Duck (1965) by Carl Barks.
- ”The Phantom of The Opera - The Graphic Novel” (2020) by Varga Tomi published by A Wave Blue World
- "The Phantom of the Opera", a graphic novel (2019) by Rebecca Laff. A Webtoon adaptation of Leroux's original. Book one was released in print in 2023.
- "Ghost on the Roof” (2022) by Klaus Scrimshaw. A Webtoon modern-day re-telling of Leroux's novel.
- The Phantom of the Opera - Official Graphic Novel (2022) by Cavan Scott, José María Beroy (Illustrator). Published by Titan. Adaptation of the Andrew Lloyd Webber musical.
- The Phantom of the Opera: A Graphic Novel Adaptation (French: Le Fantôme de l'Opéra) (2025) by Paul and Gaëtan Brizzi. Published by Futuropolis.
- Universal Monsters: The Phantom of the Opera (2026): Written by Tyler Boss and artist Martin Simmons.
- Phantom of the Opera by L.K. Blackham on Webtoon.
- The Phantom of The Opera Reimagined by writers and artists Marta and Tam on Webtoon, originally published in 2024, continuing to present-day. The comic aims to combine characteristics of every Phantom-related movie, musical, book, and series into one. The team posts updates on Instagram at the username pomermalade and on Webtoon under the username pomermalade.
- Fantome-Stein by B. Duke, which is a reimagined telling of the original novel, with the change that the Phantom is Adam, Frankenstein’s monster, and continues on with the story with a few minor details changed for the two books to properly overlap.

=== Non-fiction ===
- Lessons From the Phantom of the Opera (2009) by Vicki Hopkins. Study guide to understanding the symbolism, characters, and emotions.
- The Phantom Of The Opera: Film Companion (2005) by Andrew Lloyd Webber and Joel Schumacher.
- Shadowmen (2003) by Jean-Marc Lofficier. Published by Hollywood Comics
- The Underground of the Phantom of the Opera (2002) by Jerrold E. Hogle.
- The Phantom of the Opera. Essay about the Original Novel and musical by Sandra Andrés Belenguer (2000)
- The Phantom of the Opera (Hollywood Archives Series) (1999) by Philip J. Riley.
- Phantoms of the Opera: The Face Behind the Mask by John L. Flynn. First edition published 1993, second edition in 2006.
- The Complete Phantom of the Opera (1991) by George Perry.
- Abenteuer und Geheimnis: Untersuchungen zu Strukturen und Mythen des Populärromans bei Gaston Leroux (1988) by Hans T. Siepe. Published by P. Lang.
- Le Travail de l'"obscure clarté" dans Le Fantôme de l'Opéra de Gaston Leroux by Isabelle Husson-Casta.

=== Translations ===
- 1911 The Phantom of the Opera (1911 translation)|The Phantom of the Opera into English translated by Alexander Teixeira de Mattos.
- 1911 Тайна привидѣнія Большой Оперы (lit. The Mystery of the Ghost from Grand Opera) translated into Russian by S. Solovova.
- 1926 Operaens Hemmelighed translated into Norwegian/Danish by Anna Høyer.
- 1970 Fantóm Opery translated into Czech by J.V. Svoboda.
- 1988 Fantomen på Operan translated into Swedish by Ulla Hornborg. (Translated from the English translation by Alexander Teixeira de Mattos).
- 1989 פנטום האופרה' translated into Hebrew by Arie Chashavia.
- 1990 The Phantom of the Opera translated into English by Lowell Bair.
- 1996 The Essential Phantom of the Opera translated into English by Leonard Wolf.
- 2000 Fantomet i Operaen translated into Danish by Lea Brems.
- 2004 The Phantom of the Opera translated into English by Jean-Marc Lofficier and Randy Lofficier.
- 2004 Operos vaiduoklis translated into Lithuanian by Neringa Andrašiūnaitė
- Opera Za no Kaijin (オペラ座の怪人, lit. The Phantom of the Opera) Japanese title translation.
- 2009 The Phantom of the Opera translated into English by Mireille Ribière. Published by Penguin Classics. Annotated edition published in 2012.
- 2012 The Phantom of the Opera translated into English by David Coward. Published by Oxford World's Classics.
- 2019 The Phantom of the Opera Dual Language English-French edition. Using Alexander Teixeira de Mattos's English translation.

== Music ==
- English heavy metal band Iron Maiden included a song titled "Phantom of the Opera", based on the novel, on their 1980 debut album. A live recording was included as the B-side to the 1985 "Run to the Hills" live single, the cover of which features the band's mascot Eddie as the Phantom.
- Cover band Me First and the Gimme Gimmes recorded a punk rock version of the title track from Andrew Lloyd Webber's musical on their 1999 album Are a Drag.
- Heavy metal band Iced Earth wrote a song titled "The Phantom Opera Ghost," released in 2001. The song is built around an abbreviated retelling of the story, with lead singer Matt Barlow playing the role of the Phantom, and Yunhui Percifield playing the role of Christine.
- Gothic rock band Dreams of Sanity has recorded cover versions of the title track from Lloyd Webber's musical.
- Phantasia is the orchestral interpretation created by Andrew and Julian Lloyd Webber. A cello assumes the role of the Phantom (Julian Lloyd Webber) while a violin assumes the role of Christine (Sarah Chang).
- Rick Wakeman's 1991 album Phantom Power was a release of songs from his soundtrack for the 1925/29 silent film, re-released in 2010 as Rick Wakeman - Phantom of the Opera.
- There is a techno version of the Phantom of the Opera theme song (Harajuku – Phantom Of The Opera, 1992).
- A heavy metal song by the band Cristal y Acero from Mexico covering the main theme of Webber's The Phantom of the Opera.
- Banya covered Webber's "The Phantom Of The Opera" for the game Pump It Up.
- Finnish Symphonic metal band Nightwish covered the title song for their fourth studio album Century Child.
- Swiss gothic Metal band Lacrimosa has covered the title song of the musical.
- In 2004, to tie in with the film adaptation of the musical, Junior Vasquez made remixes of the title song.
- DCI corps Santa Clara Vanguard won 1st place with a show based on and using music from the musical in 1989, after finishing 2nd with a similar Phantom of the Opera show in 1988.
- American singer David Cook sang "The Music of the Night" for his Top 6 (Andrew Lloyd Webber week) on American Idol (season 7).
- Japanese singer Mika Nakashima sampled the musical's title song in her song IT'S TOO LATE.
- Singer-songwriter Bob Dylan mentions The Phantom in his song Desolation Row from the album Highway 61 Revisited. The Phantom is depicted in a scene having dinner with Casanova.
- Japanese rock band D released a single titled "Yami Yori Kurai Doukoku no ACAPELLA to Bara Yori Akai Jounetsu no ARIA" with the title song depicting the Phantom's emotions for Christine.
- Walter Murphy recorded an album entitled "The Phantom of the Opera" in 1978 that heavily featured Bach's Toccata and Fugue in D Minor, mixed into songs that all had something to do with the story of Erik and Christine
- Metalcore band Chiodos laments as Erik in their song "Hey Zeus! The Dungeon".
- A capella band Moosebutter used the melody of "The Music of the Night" to tell the story of the movie Psycho, in a song entitled "Psycho the Musical".
- In 2022 Cpop group Wayv debuted their Phantom of the Opera inspired album titled "Phantom".

== Games ==
Several different computer games have been released based on the Phantom of the Opera or that make some reference to it.

- Erik: Phantom of the Opera (1987) — A platform game published by Crysys.
- Phantom of the Opera (1990) — A pinball machine produced by Data East.
- Return of the Phantom (1993) - a graphic adventure game from MicroProse where the player travels back and forth between 1881 and 1993 to solve the mystery of the Phantom.
- Gloria Von Gouton’s level in Psychonauts is set up like a theater, with the play being an exaggerated retelling of Gloria's life. The theater is menaced by a skull-masked figure known as the Phantom, who is sabotaging the production.
- Mystery Legends: The Phantom of the Opera (2010) — Developed by Big Fish Games, the hidden object style game takes place about 20 years after the events of the book happen. The player plays as Christine's daughter, Evelina, who looks exactly like Christine when she last met the Phantom. The Phantom still lives in the opera house, which is now abandoned. He invites Evelina back under the impression that she is Christine to sing once more. Evelina looks around the opera house getting constant flashbacks to the events of the book.
- Fate Grand Order (2015) — An online free-to-play mobile role-playing game based on the Fate/stay night visual novel game features Erik, referred to as The Phantom of the Opera or simply Phantom as an Assassin-class Servant able to be summoned by the player.
- Time Princess: Dreamtopia (2020) — A dress-up, butterfly effect game developed by IGG Inc. with a main storyline adapted from the original Phantom of the Opera novel. The player plays as Christine, making choices each stage which determine the outcome of the story. There are six major endings and three minor endings.
- MazM: Phantom of the Opera (2021) — A visual novel which adapts the original Phantom of the Opera story.

== Other media ==
- On CollegeHumor.com, Streeter occasionally plays the Phantom of the Office, portrayed as an annoying co-worker who makes numerous references to fire, his home in the catacombs, and various violent games (i.e. "Beat The Greek" which involves "putting an adolescent Greek girl in a sack and beating her to a pulp"). He also shows violent tendencies, suggesting hanging bat boys at baseball games, splitting Sarah down the middle, etc.
- On an episode of Late Show with David Letterman, Will Ferrell sings "The Music of the Night", with mostly incorrect lyrics, after stating, "I don't have it totally down" and "I don't know the name of it."
- A picture of the Lon Chaney Phantom is used at least once on Monty Python's Flying Circus.
- The villainous "Phantom of Vaudeville" and his ventriloquist dummy, Elmo, as featured on The Ghost Busters may be a reference to the Phantom, as both are masked, and, as Kong notes, "the only way to send a Phantom back is to unmask him."
- In the Academy 27 spin-off series of WARS Trading Card Game, the short story The Phantom acts as a homage to the property, with the plot revolving around a "Phantom" terrorizing a school theater production and a scene where the characters find the book itself. A sequel would continue the "Phantom" motif with Shadows of the Phantom.
- In one episode of Kappa Mikey, the Phantom is parodied as "The Phantom of the Studio", using a mask because someone wrote "fart" on his forehead.
- In the episode of The Suite Life of Zack & Cody entitled "Arwinstein", at London's Halloween party, one guest is dressed as the Phantom with the full mask. Also, when Arwinstein kidnaps Carey and brings her to Arwin's secret room, it is similar to the "Down Once More/Track Down This Murderer" scene from the musical. In another episode, "Cookin' with Romeo and Juliet", there is a man wearing the Phantom's half-mask in the ballroom scene.
- A statue of Red Death can be seen a few times in the background by the door.
- A bust of Lon Chaney as the Phantom can be seen twice near the stage.
- In the first High School Musical, The Phantom of the Opera is mentioned in dialogue when Chad is trying to talk Troy out of the musical while the two are in the library.
- There is an episode of The Snorks (called "Summer and Snork"), where Junior takes on a Phantom-like role to scare All-Star out of the lead part. Tooter takes over the role of a crossover between Sherlock Holmes and The Persian from the Gaston Leroux novel.
- A production briefly appeared in an episode of Family Guy. Peter makes a reference to the Phantom in saying "this is even more boring than when I went to see The Phantom of the Opera", which then cuts to the stage, where the Phantom (voice provided also by Seth MacFarlane) sings a song similar to "Music of the night", then Peter (sitting in the audience) yells, "Show us the gross half of your face, that nose better be piggy!".
- The Phantom is called "the gayest super villain ever" by Homer Simpson, particularly the Andrew Lloyd Webber version. Erik seems to be a recurring background character on The Simpsons. He has appeared in several episodes, the most noticeable of which include:

- "Homer of Seville"

In one scene there is a poster for The Phantom of the Opera behind Homer. Also, Marge is worried about a disaster happening while Homer is performing, so Chief Wiggum informs her that they have pre-crashed the chandelier.

- "Flaming Moe"

During Homer's haughty speech from the rafters when he reveals that the Flaming Moe's secret ingredient is cough syrup, notice the robe deftly draped over his face like the Phantom's mask (from Andrew Lloyd Webber's musical).

- "Lisa's Wedding"

In an episode set in the future, Martin Prince has become the Phantom after a horrible science fair accident.

- "Homer Simpson, This Is Your Wife"

The Phantom appears on Lenny's HiDef TV when Homer first turns it on.

- "Treehouse of Horror XX"

Barney is shown on a boat emerging from the mist at Moe's bar. He is dressed up like the Phantom from Andrew Lloyd Webber's 1986 musical and sings about how Moe's beer is great.

- The Phantom has also been featured in Married... with Children, multiple children's shows (an episode of Animaniacs is quite memorable, while a whole episode of the show Count Duckula was set in Paris and featured the Phantom throughout), and even soap operas like Passions.
- An episode of The Mask: The Animated Series called "Broadway Malady" had The Mask as The Phantom of the Opera who tried to ruin the Mad Monkey Musical with a falling chandelier, but due to budget constraints, was reduced to using a small light fixture (the chandelier fall was seen at the end of the episode when the insane Broadway director creates a musical number with many Mask villains while in prison).
- In one Tiny Toon Adventures episode, Buster Bunny is playing the organ and is wearing the Phantom of the Opera mask.
- In an episode of CyberChase episode, the two-headed creature Sams is playing an organ, and when he stops a chandelier above Matt and Inez drops and stops right above them.
- Wilson on Home Improvement dressed-up as the Phantom in a Halloween episode.
- In the animated film Quest For Camelot, during the song If I Didn't Have You, two-headed dragon(s) Devon and Cornwall morph into the Phantom and Madame Butterfly.
- In Lemony Snicket's A Series of Unfortunate Events, Count Olaf (Jim Carrey) has a newspaper with a picture of Lon Chaney as the Phantom on the front page.
- The Phantom (from the Andrew Lloyd Webber adaptation) showed up in Backstreet Boys music video "Everybody".
- Erik (from Leroux's original novel) shows up in Have You Got Any Castles? together with Frankenstein's monster, Mr. Hyde and Fu Manchu, on The Looney Tunes Golden Collection Volume. It was also featured on the cover of Video Watchdog.
- In an episode of Sex and the City, Carrie sees her old flame Mr. Big at the Opera. After storming out she thinks to herself "I felt like I had just seen The Phantom of the Opera".
- He appears in an episode of Jimmy Neutron that focuses on Jimmy unmasking a series of "Phantoms" who turn out to be his classmates before finally coming to the "real" Phantom.
- In the SpongeBob SquarePants episode, "Something Smells", SpongeBob thinks he is ugly, and at one point he is seen in a long black cape playing a pipe organ.
- In an episode of The Fresh Prince of Bel-Air, Carlton is in charge of the Peacock, but something goes wrong and a lot of strange figures arrive, one of them being the Broadway Phantom.
- In Neopets, two collectible cards make references. "The Phantom", which is clearly meant to resemble the Phantom, and "Riyella" which features the description "The Phantom's true love".
- The Phantom is included among the band in the Beetlejuice cartoon show at Universal Studios Theme Parks. He also is a featured character in The Sadie Chronicles.
- In the children's series, Arthur, a 'clip' from the "Phantom of the Opera" appears when Arthur is watching television, avoiding practicing piano. He also appears in an episode about plagiarism when Francine has a dream about the consequences of copying.
- An episode of Histeria! featured a "Dating Game"-type skit with composers instead of suitors, and one was Andrew Lloyd Webber (he was just identified as Andrew) wearing the Phantom's costume while standing in the boat from the title number in the middle of a Gothic, subterranean lake.
- Slovenian metal band Coptic Rain covered/remixed the main theme song on their Discovery EP.
- During Batman Returns, there is a scene at a costume party, and in the background we see a guest with a skull mask and a large, red hat standing on a staircase.
- In season 1 of That Girl, an episode is entitled "Phantom of the Horse Opera"
- The rapper Lil Wayne mentions Phantom of the Opera in his song Hustler Musik.
- During a sketch called "New Off-Broadway Shows" on Conan O'Brien, they performed "Infomercial: The Musical", during which the Phantom appears with a juicer, while singing "I am the Phantom of the Juicer!"
- The Doctor Who story The Caves of Androzani shares many similarities to Leroux's work, although the circumstances of Sharaz Jek's disfigurement owe more to the 1943 film version. The Talons of Weng-Chiang also shares many similarities, with the titular villain wearing a mask, using a theater as his underground base and pretending to be a ghost haunting the theater.
- "The Phantom Opera Ghost" is a song done by Iced Earth on their Album "Horror Show"
- In the pilot episode of Clerks: The Animated Series, the Phantom can be seen briefly in a sewer watching a signal go through a cable line.
- Meatloaf's video for"I'd Do Anything for Love (but I Won't Do That)" is based on The Phantom of the Opera as well as Beauty and the Beast.
- World Wrestling Entertainment (WWE) wrestler The Undertaker had to wear a Phantom of the Opera like mask after Mabel fractured Undertaker's orbital eye bone in 1995.
- In Teenage Mutant Ninja Turtles III, Raphael references the Phantom nearly at the end of the climax when Walker appears with April O'Neil as hostage, saying "Hey look, it's the Phantom of the Opera."
- In the Star Trek: Voyager episode, "The Void", the crew discovers a humanoid creature, whose healing process is helped along by an aria from the opera Rigoletto. The Doctor therefore names this creature Fantome, after the Phantom of the Opera, who he describes as "a tormented character who is soothed by music."
- In the Teenage Mutant Ninja Turtles episode "Timing Is Everything", a poster can be seen for Alien of the Opera, an obvious parody of The Phantom.
- The Phantom briefly appears in Waxwork. In one scene, the villainous tour guide Lincoln (played by David Warner) learns that there are at least several Phantom movies in existence. Lincoln says in disbelief, "They made a movie about the Phantom of the Opera?" Lincoln shoves a teenage visitor named Jonathon into the display and whispers under his breath, "They'll make a movie about anything nowadays." Seconds later, Jonathon appears in the display as the Phantom. In the climatic ending, the Phantom appears among the army of now-living wax figures.
- In Gremlins 2: The New Batch, one of the Gremlins gets splashed with acid on his face. He immediately dons a mask and imitates the Phantom.
- In the webcomic CONvicts, pages 78–85 deal with David, Andrew, and Alex going to the Masquerade to hunt down the Masquerade Ghost (dressed as Webber's Phantom) for a reward. Throughout the arc the Masquerade Ghost crashes a chandelier and takes down his opponents not by strangling them, but by kicking them in the groin.
- In the Japanese horror film, Ring 0: Birthday, the main character, Sadako Yamamura, a character similar to the Phantom, wears a half mask in an amateur play called 'Mask'. Also, the leading actress, Aiko, is killed to make room for Sadako, as Carlotta was replaced by Christine. A lighting rig also crashes to the stage, like the chandelier.
- The rose and mask logo appears in the "Irregarding Steve" episode of American Dad!, in which Steve and Roger run away to New York City. In another episode, Roger becomes the "Phantom of the Telethon".
- In Meet the Robinsons, Doris the hat tries to cut the chandelier on top of Lewis's head.
- In a Saturday NBC series titled The Kids from C.A.P.E.R. (1976–1977), there is an episode titled "The Phantom of the Drive-in Movie." One of the team members, Bugs, describes the falling chandelier scene from the 1943 movie. As the others remind him that they are at a drive-in movie and thus should fear no such thing this time, a chandelier comes crashing down.
- In an episode of MacGyver, MacGyver's mortal enemy, Murdoc, who was horribly disfigured due to a flamethrower accident in a previous episode, disguises himself with a prosthetic face and goes by the name Jacques Leroux (a reference to Gaston Leroux). He falls in love with MacGyver's friend, Penny Parker, eventually kidnapping her, and the episode climaxes in an underground lair filled with booby traps.
- Are You Afraid of the Dark? had an episode similar to the plot of Phantom of the Opera about a monster who lived in a high school and kidnapped a talented female violinist. (2000)
- Goosebumps: "The Phantom of the Auditorium" episode has a school put on a play called The Phantom. Unfortunately, someone is out to stop the show. (1995)
- Flying Rhino Junior High features a character, Earl, who lives underneath the school and constantly wants people to call him 'The Phantom'.
- Aqua Teen Hunger Force: In the episode Super Model, at the end Frylock comes without his goatee and is wearing firemen's clothes. Meatwad hands Frylock a Phantom mask and says to him that "the fire was so bad that it burnt your face".
- In one episode of Wishbone titled Pantin' at the Opera, the beloved Jack Russell terrier plays the role of Raoul de Chagny.
- An episode of Babar features a Phantom-esque character who lived in the cellars of a rundown movie house, and frightened people away so that he could be left alone. He (unnecessarily) wore a domino mask.
- Rhydian Roberts sang a version of "The Phantom of the Opera" in the 4th series of The X Factor (October 27, 2007).
- The Muppet Show had a Phantom that haunted the theater dubbed "The Phantom of the Muppet Theater".
- Mega Man Star Force 2 has a character named Dark Phantom (Phantom Black in Japan).
- In a season 2 episode of Night Gallery, Leslie Nielsen appears in one of his first comical roles as a "Phunny Phantom" in a short feature titled The Phantom of What Opera?
- In a season 4 episode of Supernatural, Sam Winchester (Jared Padalecki) is seen walking into a moviehouse called the Goethe Theater after hours. The feature film is The Phantom of the Opera. In the stereotypical Phantom fashion, a "mysterious" shadowy figure inside is at the organ playing Bach's "Toccata and Fugue". Believing this organist to be a murdering shape-shifter, Sam sneaks up behind him in a gender-bender parody of the unmasking scene in an attempt to tear off his ear. This turns out to be an embarrassing mistake for Sam.
- On Chowder's "Panini for President", Gorgonzola wears a black cape and Phantom's mask and a part from the Phantom of the Opera's Theme Song Beginning starts to play.
- In Dean Koontz's book From the Corner of His Eye, a Phantom reference is made on page 559, 2nd paragraph.
- In Season 9 of Night Court, in episodes 1 (173) and 2 (174), titled "A Guy Named Phantom (Part 1)" and "A Guy Named Phantom (Part 2)", Harry and Christine are both confused over their feelings for each other, but before they can work them out, the deranged Dan (referring to himself as "The Phantom," wearing a mask and cape, and living in hiding) kidnaps Christine at a courthouse costume party.
- In the Degrassi film Degrassi Takes Manhattan, a Phantom of the Opera poster can be seen in the background in one of the first scenes in New York.
- In Phineas and Ferb, in an episode called Rollercoaster the Musical: Part 1, Phineas sings, and a famous musicals montage comes in during the song. Phantom of the Opera is one of them.
- In Grey's Anatomy, Season 5, Episode 9 (In the Midnight Hour), the unmasking scene from Lon Chaney's 1925 Phantom of the Opera is seen playing on a TV screen in the Seattle Grace waiting room.
- In the Monster High series, there is a character named Operetta, who is the daughter of the Phantom.
- Hotel Transylvania 2 features The Phantom of the Opera (voiced by Jon Lovitz) as the organ player for the hotel.
- An episode of Chucky features Chucky dressed up as the Phantom. After causing a chandelier to fall on seven people, he unmasks himself revealing his old face.
- Nicki Minaj mentions the Phantom in her song Massive Attack (Feat. Sean Garret) rapping, "It's just me Mr. Miyagi and the phantom of the opera, goin blocka muthaf****, got that big rocketlauncher"
- Two references to the Phantom of the Opera were made in Scooby-Doo franchise:

- In the Season 1, Episode 3 episode of Scooby-Doo, Where Are You!, the episode's villain calls himself "The Phantom". Similar to the Gaston Leroux novel, he appears to have ghost-like properties through tricks and lives in a series of catacombs. While the main cast attempts to catch the Phantom with a Rube Goldberg Machine, there is also a chandelier that falls.
- In Scooby-Doo! Stage Fright, the main villain of the movie is the Phantom of the Opera. In total, there are five “Phantom’s of the Opera” in the movie.

- He appears as an Assassin-class Servant in the mobile RPG Fate/Grand Order, voiced by Ryōtarō Okiayu.
- The Phantom of the Opera is referenced multiple times in It's Always Sunny in Philadelphia.

- Season 3, Episode 9- "Dee is Dating a Retarded Person"

After The Gang mock Charlie's "Nightman" song, Charlie retreats to his apartment, wears a black cape, places candles all around his room and composes his music on a keyboard in the dark. He is snapped out of this by Dennis.

- Season 6, Episode 7- "Who Got Dee Pregnant?"

Charlie shows up to the Halloween Party dressed as The Phantom, though he admits he has no idea who The Phantom is and thought that the costume was a vampire.

- Season 10, Episode 3- "Psycho Pete Returns"

Upon enlisting Cricket for help, Mac and Charlie see his face half covered by a cloak, resembling that of The Phantom. Charlie asks if he doing some sort of a "Phantom of the Opera thing" and Mac asks Cricket to take it off since he doesn't like it. Upon taking off the cloak, we learn half of Cricket's face was burnt when the gang locked him in their apartment and set it on fire.

- In the mobile game Arknights, a high-rarity Operator with a tragic, theater-related backstory goes by the codename Phantom. He is accompanied by a black cat named Miss Christine.
- At Universal's Epic Universe in the "Dark Universe" themed world on the dark ride Monsters Unchained: The Frankenstein Experiment, a Lon Chaney-styled Phantom can be seen near the start of the ride in the catacombs under Darkmoor before the experiment is begun. His pipe organ now has a pyrotechnic effect.
- In the episode "Truthseekers" of the webseries Helluva Boss, Blitzo is portrayed as a parody of the phantom of the opera, wearing the half mask as he plays the organ in Moxxie's vision caused by the truth serum.
- In Episode 10 of Season 3, “Soulmates,” of the show Parks and Recreation, there is a brief exchange that goes on as follows: “Describe your ideal man,” “He’s dark and mysterious,” “And he can sing. And he plays the organ,” “I think you just described the Phantom of the Opera,” and lastly, “Mm.”
- In Episode 3 of Season 2, "Exes and Oohs," of the show Helluva Boss, Moxie is looking through old photos of him and his wife, Millie, on his phone before stumbling across one where he and his wife are both holding an object that closely resembles a Phantom of the Opera playbill (solid black background, with a yellow strip at the very top, and a white phantom mask in the lower right corner).
