= Doctrine of Labyrinths =

Magical fantasy tetralogy by Sarah Monette

- Mélusine; The Virtu; The Mirador; Corambis
- Author: Sarah Monette
- Country: United States
- Language: English
- Publisher: Ace Books
- Published: 2005-2009

Doctrine of Labyrinths is a series of fantasy novels by Sarah Monette. It is set in the secondary world of Meduse and tells the story of the adventures of the wizard Felix Harrowgate and his half-brother, former assassin Mildmay the Fox. The series is made up of Mélusine, The Virtu, The Mirador, and Corambis.
