= The Growth of English Schooling, 1340–1548 =

1985 book by Jo Ann Hoeppner Moran

The Growth of English Schooling, 1340–1548: Learning, Literacy, and Laicization in Pre-Reformation York Diocese
- Cover
- Author: Jo Ann Hoeppner Moran
- Language: English
- Subject: History of education in England
- Publisher: Princeton University Press
- Publication date: 1985
- Publication place: United States
- Media type: Print
- Pages: 326
- Awards: John Nicholas Brown Prize (1989)
- ISBN: 0-691-05430-4

The Growth of English Schooling, 1340–1548: Learning, Literacy, and Laicization in Pre-Reformation York Diocese is a 1985 book by the American historian Jo Ann Hoeppner Moran. Moran documents elementary and grammar schooling in the Diocese of York over the two centuries before the English Reformation, mainly from some 15,000 wills in the York probate registers and other diocesan records. She argues that schooling and lay literacy were expanding well before 1548 and that the "educational revolution" historians had assigned to the later sixteenth century began in the late Middle Ages. The book won the John Nicholas Brown Prize of the Medieval Academy of America in 1989.

== Summary ==
The diocese of York, the largest of England's seventeen medieval dioceses, covered Yorkshire, Nottinghamshire, the northern half of Lancashire, and parts of Westmorland and Cumberland, and held roughly a tenth of England's population. Moran presents it as a test case for the country. Schooling before the Reformation, she argues, was far more widely available, and growing faster, than historians had allowed. In her account, the "educational revolution" which Lawrence Stone and others placed in the years 1560–1640 grew out of a much older expansion. The study rests on some 15,000 wills from the York probate registers, read for bequests to schools, schoolmasters, and scholars, together with ordination lists, chantry certificates, episcopal registers, visitation records, and school foundation documents.

The debate Moran enters runs from A. F. Leach's surveys of medieval schools, through Joan Simon, W. K. Jordan, and Stone, who treated the mid-sixteenth century as the real beginning of English educational growth, to Nicholas Orme, whose school counts pointed the other way. Earlier writers had noticed elementary teaching, but they folded song, reading, and writing instruction into a single category they usually called the "song school." Moran separates four kinds of teaching: song, reading, writing, and grammar. A song school taught singing and did not always teach reading or writing. Writing was often a skill apart, taught by a writing master who kept his own school or visited an elementary school for a limited period. Literacy she defines as reading Latin or the vernacular, not signing one's name. Her criteria for classifying fragmentary school references are the ages and later careers of pupils, the presence of girls, the standing of schoolmasters, and the institutional features of a foundation. A testator's pennies for "every child that canne syng" at his funeral, for instance, are read as evidence of a local song school.

The result is 85 grammar schools and some 245 elementary (reading, song, and petty) schools. Teaching of some kind may have been under way in a third of the diocese's roughly 700 parishes by 1548. Reading schools increased 125 percent in the second quarter of the fifteenth century, and grammar schools nearly tripled between 1500 and 1548, an "explosion in grammar education." Girls appear among the elementary pupils, including in song schools, and the book gathers the surviving evidence for their schooling and literacy.

Moran looks for the causes of this growth first within the Church. Successive ecclesiastical decrees had urged cathedrals, parishes, and other ecclesiastical bodies to provide and support teaching, and the book traces their effect alongside the demand for priests after the plague, the multiplication of chantries, the liturgical needs of parish churches, and the patronage of bishops and religious houses. A surge in priestly ordinations after 1460, driven by demand for chantry and stipendiary priests to say masses for the dead, was possible because a modest liturgical education sufficed for most ordinands. Schooling also depended on books, and Moran follows the growing availability of books for scholars and the circulation of books from hand to hand within the diocese.

At the same time, education was becoming laicized. Lay people founded and endowed schools, sat as their governors, paid the fees of scholars, and learned to read in growing numbers. After the 1450s, and especially after 1500, the gentry of the diocese began to found schools of their own and to send their sons to local grammar schools instead of relying on household instruction. Increasingly, the children in these schools were not expected to enter the clergy, a further mark of the laicization of education. Moran finds no struggle between churchmen and laymen over the schools of the kind Joan Simon had described. Clerical and lay initiative reinforced each other, and the relationship was collaborative and expansive rather than contentious. By 1530, she estimates, about 15 percent of the lay population of York diocese (20–25 percent of men) could read, a figure for the northern diocese rather than for England as a whole. What this laity read, to judge from books bequeathed in wills, was mostly service books and devotional literature, not romances or humanist texts. The motives behind lay investment in schooling were "quite traditional, neither heretical nor reform-minded." The sixteenth-century educational revolution, Moran concludes, "had significant medieval roots" and may need to be moved back fifty or sixty years. The erosion of the clergy's educational advantage had meanwhile prepared the way for the Reformation's transfer of power from ecclesiastical to lay hands.

== Critics ==
"Any future social history of England will owe an essential debt to such regional studies as this," Arthur B. Ferguson wrote, adding that few had "equalled the depth of research it represents or the quality of the author's insights." Moran, he argued, had made it harder to explain Renaissance education solely in terms of humanism, Protestant Bible-reading, and Edward VI's administration. Her tone became "at times stridently defensive," he observed, but she remained "eminently reasonable and moderate in her conclusions," preferring a bridge between opposing interpretations to a polemic. His one disappointment was the treatment of the early sixteenth century: he wished for more on humanism and the Reformation. This, he wrote, "is perhaps to wish for another book," and did not detract from "a book that is very good as it stands."

David Cressy accepted the book's case for the medieval roots of the "educational revolution" of Elizabethan and early Stuart England, but questioned its inclination "to a generous and optimistic interpretation, seeing schools where others might simply see acts of piety." Moran "posits, speculates, assumes, and ascribes when the only alternative is silence," he wrote, and the evidence drawn from funeral bequests was plentiful but "not necessarily persuasive." The literacy estimates drew his sharpest objection: the claimed rates were "simply a guess, and an optimistic one at that," derived from "a curiously slapdash calculation" involving population estimates and assumptions about school attendance. Tudor and Stuart historians had claimed too much for their periods, he warned, and "Moran is in danger of overclaiming for hers."

Claire Cross, who called the book "innovative," read it as a deliberate attempt to close the gap between medievalists and early modernists over the pace of English educational expansion. She thought the claims for elementary education much more challenging than the well-documented count of grammar schools, and allowed that some readers might remain skeptical of quantifying instruction and literacy in this way. Qualitatively, however, Moran's case for "the general availability of some degree of education in the York diocese in the early sixteenth century" carried conviction. If the concept of an educational revolution in early modern England was to retain any usefulness, Cross concluded, "it will need to be predated by at least half a century."

Janet Coleman described it as "a timely and important study, ten years in the making," in the tradition of A. F. Leach and Nicholas Orme. In her judgment Moran had "provided the evidence for a total reassessment and revision" of interpretations that made the English Reformation the catalyst for a sixteenth-century educational revolution. She endorsed the book's distinctions among song, reading, and grammar education, finding an "ideal confirmation" of them in Chaucer's chorister, who "learns song but knows little grammar." Sixteenth-century historians, she advised, "need to lengthen their perspective if they are to understand their own period."

With "all the bravery expected of a young challenger," Malcolm C. Burson wrote, Moran had entered lists long dominated by Lawrence Stone and Joan Simon. Her "lively and readable study" was likely to become "the center of the melee for the near future." The most important discovery, he thought, was the clear increase in elementary education in the early fifteenth century, well before the growth of the grammar schools. The last chapter, on literary interests, he found "disappointing"; it rested on an asserted northern devotional tradition rather than on the book's own data. He regretted, too, that Moran did not pursue causes more vigorously: "I kept asking myself, 'Why? Why here, why at this time?'" He nevertheless called the work "a good example of careful research and bold use of important new information" and hoped other scholars would test its conclusions elsewhere in England.

Pamela Nightingale acknowledged "the heroic examination of 15,000 wills" but doubted the inferences drawn from testamentary gifts for scholars at funerals. In about 40 of the 54 such references after 1450, she argued, there was no evidence that local children were meant, and the standard penny payment suggested hired children, possibly from schools in neighbouring towns. The figures for rural elementary education and literacy were therefore suspect. The doubling of grammar schools between 1500 and 1550 seemed to her better documented, and she faulted the book for leaving the economic background to school founding unexamined. Moran had "clearly established that the expansion of education predates the Reformation," Nightingale granted, "even though she has not taken some wider factors into account and from her evidence sometimes draws unwarranted conclusions."

For W. R. Jones the work was "a deep study" that extracted important facts about elementary and secondary education from meticulously examined archives. It demonstrated that the "educational revolution" of the late sixteenth and early seventeenth centuries had medieval roots, and that the mid-fifteenth-century rise in clerical recruitment stemmed from the greater accessibility of schooling. What he found of "commanding interest" was the laicization argument. A literate laity, indulging its "traditional religiosity" in Bible-reading and devotional study, confronted "a burgeoning cadre of minimally educated clerical servitors." The situation was potentially explosive, and it pointed toward the Reformation. This interpretation, he noted, required no appeal to Lollard, humanist, or early Lutheran influences.

D. M. Palliser called the study "impressive and persuasive," grounded on "prodigious industry" in nearly 15,000 mostly unprinted wills. He considered its most important achievement to be the identification and listing of 85 grammar schools and 245 elementary schools in the diocese, more than any previous tally and far beyond the minimal pre-Reformation figures allowed by W. K. Jordan. He saw room for disagreement over the chronology of school foundations, since much hinged on the survival of evidence, and judged the index unsatisfactory.

== Later work ==
The book had left the economics of school founding largely unexamined, as Nightingale noted. Moran took the question up in "Education, Economy, and Clerical Mobility in Late Medieval Northern England," a chapter published in 2000. Setting York, Hull, and Bristol, all in economic decline after the plague, beside the flourishing Exeter, she found that the three declining towns kept or added to their schools while Exeter, with a single cathedral school and no endowed grammar school until the 1630s, invested least. Other growing towns showed the same pattern, and York, in the midst of its own impoverishment, took on the cost of a school of its own for the first time. In the countryside the picture was different. The ordination registers of Archbishop Thomas Rotherham show that 92 percent of the acolytes ordained in the diocese between 1480 and 1500 came from villages and small market towns, and Moran tied the spread of rural reading and song schools to rising rural prosperity, the new interest of gentry families in schooling, and continued ecclesiastical support. Rural prosperity and urban decline, she concluded, "could work together to undergird a growth in educational commitments and investments."
