= The Queen in Winter =

The Queen in Winter is a collection of four fantasy stories by four different authors.

== A Whisper of Spring ==
=== Lynn Kurland ===
Lynn Kurland was born in Hawaii and has always loved to write. She writes in the genres of fantasy, historical fiction, time travel and romance. She is a best-selling author. In college she trained to be a classical musician. She can play cello and piano and likes to sing on occasion. Over the years she has published numerous books. She spends her days writing and is married with two children.

=== Plot summary ===
In A Whisper of Spring, Iolaire is kidnapped from her home by the black mage Lothar of Wychweald. Iolaire is the daughter of King Proiseil of Ainneamh. She is an elf. Her brother Ehrne contacts Symon of Neroche to help rescue his sister. Symon and Lothar are brothers. They are both the son of Yngerame, the mage king of Wychweald. Ehrne hopes that Symon will be strong enough to defeat his brother. In the end, it takes both Symon and his father to defeat Lothar and rescue Iolaire. On their way to return Iolaire to her father, Symon and Iolaire fall in love. The problem is that if Iolaire agrees to marry Symon her father will disinherit her and she will never be allowed back to her homeland. Symon solves this problem by asking for Iolaire's hand in marriage as she has one foot in her kingdom and one foot in his. The story ends with their wedding.

== When Winter Comes ==
=== Sharon Shinn ===
Sharon Shinn has always enjoyed writing. She began her career by penning poetry at the age of ten. She attended Northwestern University and graduated with a degree in journalism. After graduation she worked for three magazines; The Professional Photographer, DÉCOR, and BizEd. Currently, Shinn writes her novels in the evenings and on weekends. Her weekdays are taken up by her full-time job; which she has held for the past ten years while working on her prolific writing career. When she is not working, or writing, she is reading.

=== Plot summary ===
When Winter Comes is a mini-story set in the Twelve Houses world created by Sharon Shinn. The story revolves around Sosie and her sister Annie's struggle to survive in a world that hates mystics. At the beginning of the story, Annie gives birth to an illegitimate child who is also a mystic. She and her son, Kinnon, are thrown out of her father's house and the village due to the people's fear of mystics. Sosie, angry at her family for falling prey to the prejudice against mystics, chooses to leave with her sister and nephew. In their search to find someplace safe to live Sosie and Annie meet up with Ser Darryn Rappengrass and his men. Darryn is one of the few members of the upper class who does not believe that mystics are evil. Darryn and his men help Sosie and her sister find their way to Lara's house. Lara is a mystic who has offered shelter to Annie and Sosie. Annie and Sosie stay with Lara for a while but eventually decide to make their way to Carrebos, a refuge for mystics and a place where they can live openly. Along the way, they meet up with Darryn Rappengrass again and a romantic attachment forms between Sosie and Darryn. However, they part ways and the girls continue to Carrebos. Once there Annie reunites with Kinnon's father. The story ends with the arrival of Darryn and his reunion with Sosie.

== The Kiss of Snow Queen ==
=== Claire Delacroix ===
Claire Delacroix is one of the pseudonyms used by Deborah Cooke. She also writes under the name Claire Cross. Deborah has an honors degree in history. She has written more than forty novels. She is married and lives in Canada.

=== Plot summary ===
The short story The Kiss of the Snow Queen is a reimagining if the classic fairy tale The Snow Queen. In The Kiss of the Snow Queen Gerta must rescue Cai who has been attacked by the beast Cath Palug and held prisoner by Isold, Gerta's former teacher. Isold wants the magic mirror that has been shattered to pieces, of which Gerta unknowingly has a piece. Isold enchants Cai and uses him as bait to lure Gerta to her. Helping guide and aid Gerta in her quest to save Cai is Loki, a fallen angel. Loki is the one who made the mirror in the first place to God his errors. In the end, Gerta rescues Cai and Loki destroys the mirror.

== A Gift of Wings ==
=== Sarah Monette ===
Sarah Monette was born in Oak Ridge, Tennessee. She has a M.A. and a Ph.D. in English Literature. She is married. She writes primarily in the fantasy and horror genres, though occasionally she writes in the science fiction genre.

=== Plot summary ===
A Gift of Wings revolves around two main protagonists, Maur and his former lover Agido. Maur is a sorcerer who fought in a great war and was captured and tortured. As a result, his hands are crippled and he can no longer do magic. His grandmother has hired Agido to escort him from Karolinsberg to Igensbeck and its Universitat. Maur's grandmother hopes that the scholars at the Universitat will be able to help Maur regain the use of his powers. Maur has been severely traumatized by the torture he underwent as well as the preliminary attempts to heal him, which the reader learns later bordered on torture. He is unsure that anyone can touch him and not hurt him and his believes that due to his crippling he is no longer desirable to Agido. Agido thinks that Maur is no longer in love with her and thus does not pursue him, even though she still loves him. Unfortunately, Maur and Agido are traveling through the Pass of the Sisters in winter and get stuck in a snow storm. They take refuge in a small country inn. While they are staying at the inn another guest is murdered. Agido is suspected of being the killer. It is up to Maur to clear Agido's name and it is up to Agido to prove to Maur that she still loves him despite everything.
