= The Bone Key =

Mystery horror short story collection by Sarah Monette

- Cover of first edition
- Author: Sarah Monette
- Language: English
- Series: Kyle Murchison Booth
- Genre: Horror fiction
- Publisher: Prime Books
- Publication date: 2007
- Publication place: United States
- Media type: print (paperback)
- Pages: 255
- ISBN: 978-0-8095-5777-6

The Bone Key: The Necromantic Mysteries of Kyle Murchison Booth is a collection of mystery horror short stories by American writer Sarah Monette featuring her puzzle-solving archivist character Kyle Murchison Booth. It was first published in trade paperback by Prime Books in June 2007, with a second edition, also in trade paperback, issued by the same publisher in October 2011. The second edition includes an added introduction by Lynne M. Thomas and story notes.

== Summary ==
The book "is a series of interconnected short stories [whose] narrator/protagonist is a museum archivist--neurotic, erudite, insomniac--and he and his world are both homages to and interrogations of the works of M. R. James and H. P. Lovecraft." The introduction to the second edition adds the conceit that the tales were derived by the author from the papers of the protagonist, whom it treats as if he were an actual historical personage.

== Contents ==
- "Introduction"
- "Introduction to the Second Edition" by Dr. L. Marie Howard, MSLIS, PhD [Lynne M. Thomas]
- "Bringing Helena Back" (from All Hallows #35, February 2004)
- "The Venebretti Necklace" (from Alchemy #2, 2004)
- "The Bone Key" (from Say ... #6, 2007)
- "Wait for Me" (from Naked Snake Online, September 2004)
- "Drowning Palmer" (from All Hallows #41, February 2006)
- "The Inheritance of Barnabas Wilcox" (from Lovecraft's Weird Mysteries #7, 2004)
- "Elegy for a Demon Lover" (from Tales of the Unanticipated #26, October 2005)
- "The Wall of Clouds" (from Alchemy #1, Winter 2003)
- "The Green Glass Paperweight" (from Tales of the Unanticipated #25, August 2004)
- "Listening to Bone" (original to the collection)
- "Story Notes"
- "About the Authors"
- "Acknowledgments"

== Awards ==
The Bone Key was nominated for the 2008 Shirley Jackson Award for Single-Author Collection.

== Reception ==
Publishers Weekly calls the book "Cerebral, ethereal and stylishly understated," an "entrancing collection will appeal to fans of literary horror, dark fantasy and supernatural mystery." "Writing in the tradition of M.R. James and Algernon Blackwood, Monette reconstructs the traditional English ghost story—insinuated horror, no gratuitous sex or violence—with a decidedly modern-day approach in this laudable collection of 10 necromantic mystery stories featuring introverted museum archivist Kyle Murchison Booth." Of the stories included, "Elegy for a Demon Lover" and "Bringing Helena Back" are cited as "noteworthy," with the latter characterized as "brilliantly Lovecraftian."

Lee Mandelo at Tor.com calls the collection "a good book no matter which way you're looking at it," the stories "frequently, deeply scary," "gripping and twisty," and "damned good, too, on a narrative level," and the protagonist "a memorable character." She finds Monette "a skilled hand at writing characters with layers of emotional trauma," without which "the collection might not work as well as it does." She "strongly recommend[s] The Bone Key not just for its queer sensibilities and the questions it raises about self-definition and sexual identity, but because it treats mental illness fairly and realistically."

L. Timmel Duchamp in Strange Horizons feels "most of the stories in The Bone Key would work well read apart from the others, [but] the plausibility of the setting, the narrative voice, and the characterization of the narrator gradually fade over the course of the ten stories, with the character of Booth flattening and thinning until finally he becomes a mere cipher, and his voice becomes simply the voice of the author with little more than a tissue-thin veil between her and her narrative." She also finds the historical context of the stories disturbingly vague, and complains of a "creeping loss of verisimilitude with my reading of each successive story," noting that while "events in earlier stories are referenced in succeeding stories, they exercise no lasting effect on Booth’s life or his psychology." She does "recommend reading the best tales in the book, not necessarily in one sitting: 'The Venebretti Necklace,' 'The Wall of Clouds,' 'Elegy for A Demon Lover,' 'Wait for Me,' and 'The Green Glass Paperweight.'"

The collection was also reviewed by Faren Miller in Locus #565, February 2008 and Jeff VanderMeer in Realms of Fantasy, June 2008.
