= Corambis (novel) =

Fantasy novel by Sarah Monette

- Cover of first edition
- Author: Sarah Monette
- Cover artist: Judy York
- Language: English
- Series: Doctrine of Labyrinths #4
- Genre: Fantasy
- Publisher: Ace Books
- Publication date: April 7, 2009
- Publication place: United States
- Media type: Print (hardcover), ebook
- Pages: 400 pp
- ISBN: 9780441015962 (1st ed.)
- OCLC: 233548300
- Dewey Decimal: 813/.6
- LC Class: PS3613.O5246 C67 2009
- Preceded by: The Mirador

Corambis is a fantasy novel by Sarah Monette, the fourth book of her Doctrine of Labyrinths series, preceded by Mélusine, The Virtu, and The Mirador. It was first published in hardcover and ebook by Ace Books in April 2009, with a trade paperback edition following from the same publisher in April 2010.

== Summary ==
Prince Gerrard Hume perishes attempting to start the Cymellunar engine, a device he hoped might gain Caloxa independence from Corambis. His unrequited admirer, Margrave Kay Brightmore of Rothmarlin, blinded by the engine, is imprisoned by Corambin Duke of Glimmering.

In far off Bernatha the once powerful Cabaline wizard Felix Harrowgate resorts to sordid extremes to earn money to treat his sick half brother Mildmay, only to fall victim to a Corambin ritual that restarts another Cymellunar device, the terrible Clock of Eclipses.

The situation becomes increasingly difficult as Felix and Mildmay encounter a major challenge.

== Reception ==
Publishers Weekly calls the novel a "rambling conclusion to Monette's Mélusine fantasy quartet," which "throws in numerous unsubtle lessons on love, lust and power, but for full effect the intricate plot requires familiarity with prior installments."

The collection was also reviewed by Faren Miller in Locus no. 579, April 2009.
