= The Virtu =

2006 novel by Sarah Monette

- Cover of the first edition of The Virtu.
- Author: Sarah Monette
- Language: English
- Series: Doctrine of Labyrinths #2
- Genre: Speculative fiction
- Publisher: Ace Books
- Publication date: June 27, 2006
- Publication place: United States
- Pages: 448 pp
- ISBN: 0-441-01404-6
- OCLC: 63117001
- Dewey Decimal: 813/.6 22
- LC Class: PS3613.O5246 V57 2006
- Preceded by: Mélusine
- Followed by: The Mirador

The Virtu (2006) is a fantasy novel by Sarah Monette. It is the second book of the Doctrine of Labyrinths series, which includes Mélusine, The Mirador, and Corambis.

== Plot summary ==
Felix Harrogate, having recovered from the abuse he suffered in Mélusine, is ready to regain the power and status that he lost. With his half-brother Mildmay and Mehitabel Parr, a young governess, he decides to return to Mélusine to repair the Virtu.

== See also ==
- Doctrine of Labyrinths
