= The Mirador (novel) =

2007 novel by Sarah Monette

- Cover of the first edition of The Mirador.
- Author: Sarah Monette
- Language: English
- Series: Doctrine of Labyrinths #3
- Genre: Speculative fiction
- Publisher: Ace Books
- Publication date: August 7, 2007
- Publication place: United States
- Pages: 432 pp
- ISBN: 9780441015009
- OCLC: 85444351
- Preceded by: The Virtu
- Followed by: Corambis

The Mirador (2007) is a fantasy novel by Sarah Monette. It is the third book of the Doctrine of Labyrinths series, which includes Mélusine, The Virtu, and Corambis.

== See also ==
- Doctrine of Labyrinths
