= The Angel of the Crows =

Book by Katherine Addison

- First edition
- Author: Katherine Addison
- Language: English
- Genre: Fantasy
- Published: June 23, 2020
- Publisher: Tor Books
- Publication place: United States
- Pages: 448
- ISBN: 978-0765387394 (hardcover 1st ed)
- OCLC: 1159883677

The Angel of the Crows is a 2020 fantasy novel written by the American author Katherine Addison (a pseudonym of Sarah Monette). It is set in an alternate 19th century London, with supernatural creatures such as angels and is based on the Sherlock Holmes stories.

== Base works ==
A review on Tor.com describes the novel as a Sherlock fan fiction, with wings, with the main character made likable.

Locus notes the novel is an anthology, based on A Study in Scarlet, The Sign of the Four, The Hound of the Baskervilles.

== Reception ==
The novel has been described as a fresh taking on Sherlock Holmes, "full of juicy supernatural surprises and kind, thoughtful characterization". Reviewers note the lack of originality to the plots, as the crimes adhere closely to the original Sherlock Holmes works.
