= Mélusine (novel) =

2005 novel by Sarah Monette

- Cover of the first edition of Mélusine.
- Author: Sarah Monette
- Language: English
- Series: Doctrine of Labyrinths #1
- Genre: Speculative fiction
- Publisher: Ace Books
- Publication date: August 2, 2005
- Publication place: United States
- Pages: 432 pp
- ISBN: 9780441012862
- OCLC: 58457440
- Dewey Decimal: 813/.6 22
- LC Class: PS3613.O5246 M46 2005
- Followed by: The Virtu

Mélusine (2005) is a fantasy novel by Sarah Monette. It is the first book of the Doctrine of Labyrinths series, which includes The Virtu, The Mirador, and Corambis. It was well received upon its release; Publishers Weekly gave it a starred review and called it "extraordinary".

== Plot summary ==
The story revolves around two characters: magician Felix Harrowgate and thief Mildmay the Fox, who live in vastly different parts of the city of Mélusine. They are tossed together by fate when Felix is accused of destroying the crystal Virtu, an orb which channels the magical energy of the magicians in Mélusine.

== Characters ==
=== Felix Harrowgate ===
A wizard who, at the start of the novel, is living with the elite of the city in the Mirador. When his sordid past is revealed to his upper-class lover, he retreats to his former master and mentor Malkar Gennadion.

=== Mildmay the Fox ===
A thief in the Lower City. When he accepts what he believes to be a simple job of stealing jewelry from a nobleman, he gets entangled in the magic and politics of the city.

=== Ginevra Thomson ===
The jilted mistress of a nobleman. She hires Mildmay to steal her jewels from her ex-lover.

=== Malkar Gennadion ===
A magician who was once Felix's master and lover. He physically and magically rapes Felix and binds him in order to force Felix to shatter the Virtu.

=== Shannon Teverius ===
Felix's nobleman lover who abandons him once he learns of Felix's background.

== See also ==
- Doctrine of Labyrinths
