= The Goblin Emperor =

2014 novel by Katherine Addison

- Author: Katherine Addison
- Cover artist: Anna and Elena Balbusso
- Language: English
- Series: The Goblin Emperor
- Genre: Fantasy of manners
- Published: 1 April 2014
- Publisher: Tor Books
- Publication place: United States
- Pages: 446
- Award: Locus Award for Best Fantasy Novel (2015)
- ISBN: 978-0765326997 (hardcover 1st ed)
- OCLC: 1031918177
- Followed by: The Witness for the Dead

The Goblin Emperor is a 2014 fantasy novel written by the American author Sarah Monette under the pseudonym Katherine Addison. The novel received the Locus Award for Best Fantasy Novel and was nominated for the Nebula, Hugo and World Fantasy Awards. It was well-received by critics, who noted the strength of the protagonist's characterization and, unusual for fantasy, the work's warm and understated tone.

The book tells the story of Maia, a young man of mixed Elven and Goblin heritage, who unexpectedly becomes Emperor of the Elflands, and has to contend with the court's byzantine power structure as well as racial and social tension in his realm.

== Synopsis ==
Maia, youngest and least-favored son of the Emperor of the Elflands and of mixed Elven and Goblin heritage, unexpectedly ascends to the throne after his father and half-brothers are killed in an airship crash. Having been brought up entirely in exile from the court, living with an abusive cousin, the court is alien to him and his lack of social polish and connections make it difficult to take up his new responsibilities.

In the course of the first few months of his reign, Maia agrees to marry the noblewoman Csethiro; is seized by a crush on the opera singer Vechin; is visited by his maternal grandfather, the ruler of the Goblins; and slowly comes to terms with the loss of privacy that comes with being accompanied by bodyguards and retainers at all times. He survives an attempted coup by his half-brother's widow and his lord chancellor because his young nephew Idra refuses to usurp the throne, and his investigation into the death of his father uncovers a conspiracy by disaffected noblemen that had been using a group of worker revolutionaries to kill the previous Emperor.

The end of the novel sees Maia survive an assassination attempt by the conspiracy's ringleader, and push through a controversial project to bridge the realm's principal river. An epithet accorded to him by a courtier, "the bridgebuilder", represents his efforts to connect emotionally with the people surrounding him slowly coming to fruition.

== Reception ==
=== Critical reception ===
The Goblin Emperor received positive reviews. At io9, Michael Ann Dobbs appreciated that the strong characterization made the novel "remarkably compelling and fascinating" despite consisting almost exclusively of court intrigue and not having the protagonist really do anything: the novel, according to Dobbs, "mostly eschews plot-heavy histrionics in favor of warmth, psychological depth, and hope". Liz Bourke, writing an enthusiastic review for Tor.com, noted the "compelling attractiveness of Maia’s character" as a fundamentally decent person, as well as the author's detailed worldbuilding.

In Strange Horizons, Foz Meadows wrote that in addition to the novel's "elegant prose, intricate worldbuilding, compelling politics and (...) poignantly sympathetic protagonist", its appeal was as much thematic as structural in that it successfully joined the trappings of high fantasy to those of steampunk. She also appreciated the novel's handling "issues of race, class, gender, and sexuality in subtle but important ways", and noted that, as "a novel about abuse and power", it did not personify either as a "cackling overlord" but as institutionalized, internalized practices of entitlement, pride, and callousness, while ending not in triumph but with a muted, steady sense of progress, trust and healing.

Writing for Pornokitsch, Jared Shurin felt that the novel should not be classified as "grimdark" because the protagonist Maia Drazhar more closely fits a high fantasy style in which characters are driven by destiny, rather than a "fantasy Protestantism" in which they choose between good and evil. Addison herself says that her protagonist turned the story "in a defiantly non-grimdark direction". Shurin was disappointed that the "subtle, characterful and deeply emotive" novel was packaged in alienating genre clichés, including an excess of invented language, a "heavy-handed morality", and a "too-perfect protagonist". In a starred review, Kirkus Reviews recommended the novel unreservedly as a "spellbinding and genuinely affecting drama", noting its "powerful character studies". Publishers Weekly described the work as "less a novel than a series of anecdotes", but considered that it was "carried by the strength of atmosphere and Maia’s resonant good-heartedness". Writing in The Guardian, Francis Spufford described it as a "comfort read" that is "witty, elegant, kind".

== Awards ==
| Year | Award | Category | Result | Ref |
|---|---|---|---|---|
| 2014 | Goodreads Choice Awards | Fantasy | Nominated—16th | |
| 2014 | Nebula Award | Novel | Shortlisted | |
| 2015 | Hugo Award | Novel | Shortlisted | |
| 2015 | Locus Award | Fantasy Novel | Won | |
| 2015 | World Fantasy Award | Novel | Shortlisted | |
| 2015 | RUSA CODES Reading List | Fantasy | Won | |

== Related works ==
Several later works by Monette take place in the same fictional world:

- The Witness for the Dead (2021), a detective novel focusing on the character Thara Celehar
- The Grief of Stones (2022), a sequel to The Witness for the Dead
- The Tomb of Dragons (2025), a sequel to The Grief of Stones
- "Min Zemerin's Plan" (2022), a short story
- The Orb of Cairado (2025)
