= Somewhere Beneath Those Waves =

2011 collection of short stories by Sarah Monette

- Cover of first edition
- Author: Sarah Monette
- Cover artist: Elena Dudina
- Language: English
- Genre: Speculative fiction
- Publisher: Prime Books
- Publication date: 2011
- Publication place: United States
- Media type: print (paperback)
- Pages: 331
- ISBN: 978-1-60701-305-1

Somewhere Beneath Those Waves is a collection of speculative fiction short stories by American writer Sarah Monette. It was first published in trade paperback by Prime Books in November 2011.

== Summary ==
The book collects twenty-four novelettes and short stories and one poem by the author, five original to the collection, and the author's notes on the stories, together with an introduction by Elizabeth Bear. It includes one of Monette's "Kyle Murchison Booth" stories, "The World Without Sleep."

== Contents ==
- "Introduction" (Elizabeth Bear)
- "Draco Campestris" (from Strange Horizons, August 7, 2006)
- "Queen of Swords" (from AlienSkin #2.4, November 2003)
- "Letter from a Teddy Bear on Veterans' Day" (original to collection)
- "Under the Beansidhe's Pillow" (from Lone Star Stories #22, August 1, 2007)
- "The Watcher in the Corners" (from the author's blog, Notes from the Labyrinth, April 23, 2007)
- "The Half-Sister" (from Lady Churchill's Rosebud Wristlet #15, January 2005)
- "Ashes, Ashes" (original to collection)
- "Sidhe Tigers" (from Lady Churchill's Rosebud Wristlet #13, November 2003)
- "A Light in Troy" (from Clarkesworld Magazine #1, October 2006)
- "Amante Dorée" (from Paradox #10, Winter 2006/07)
- "Somewhere Beneath Those Waves Was Her Home" (from Fantasy, July 2007)
- "Darkness, as a Bride" (from Cemetery Dance #58, February 2008)
- "Katabasis: Seraphic Trains" (from Tales of the Unanticipated #27, July 2006)
- "Fiddleback Ferns" (from Flytrap #9, June 2008)
- "Three Letters from the Queen of Elflands" (from Lady Churchill's Rosebud Wristlet #11, November 2002)
- "Night Train: Heading West" (poem) (from The Year's Best Fantasy & Horror: Nineteenth Annual Collection, August 2008)
- "The Séance at Chisholm End" (from Alchemy #3, January 2006)
- "No Man's Land" (original to collection)
- "National Geographic On Assignment: Mermaids of the Old West" (from Fictitious Force #2, July 2006)
- "A Night in Electric Squidland" (from Lone Star Stories #15, June 2006)
- "Imposters" (original to collection)
- "Straw" (from Strange Horizons #28, June 2004)
- "Absent from Felicity" (original to collection)
- "The World Without Sleep" (from Postscripts, Spring 2008)
- "After the Dragon" (from Fantasy Magazine, January 2010)
- "Story Notes"
- "About the Author"

== Awards ==
Somewhere Beneath Those Waves placed fifteenth in the 2012 Locus Poll Award for Best Collection.

== Reception ==
Publishers Weekly calls the book "a powerful collection" whose "lyrical tales vacillate between despair and hope" and "touch on such weighty topics as the substantial consequences of saving the world, or how ghosts eventually out their killers with frightening results for those who hear and see the revelations." The reviewer notes that while "the tales vary in theme and tone, there is not a weak note in the collection, and both fans and new readers will be drawn into Monette’s strange and imaginative worlds." "A Night in Electric Squidland," "Imposters" and Amante Doree" are singled out for particular comment.

Lee Mandelo at Tor.com, noting the book is "Monete's first general short fiction collection," calls it "a strong book, achieving the necessary blance between variety and unity that single-author collections often strive for but fail to manage." They characterize its contents as "ranging from science fiction to classic horror to urban fantasy (with trains!), spanning an emotional gamut from the desolate to the uplifting, often united by their focus on people who have been othered or made outsiders in their society. ... Issues of gender, sexuality, class, and able-ness permeate Monette's short fiction; trauma and recovery, too, are common themes." They call the stories "concise, tightly-woven universes, evocative and complete in their storytelling as well as their emotional resonance. Whether the subject is Lovecraftian urban fantasy, parodic science fiction, or classic horror, Monette's prose is precise and vividly complex, often poetic." "Letter from a Teddy Bear on Veteran's Day," "The Watcher in the Corners," "Three Letters from the Queen of Elfland," "Somewhere Beneath Those Waves was Her Home," and "After the Dragon" are cited as "five stories in particular which stand out from the rest, though all are remarkably good."

The collection was also reviewed by Faren Miller in Locus #613, February 2012.
