= Batman: Masque =

1997 one-shot comic by Mike Grell

Cover art by Mike Grell.

Batman: Masque is a 1997 DC Comics Elseworlds one-shot written and illustrated by Mike Grell with coloring by Andre Khromov.

The story takes the Batman mythos and loosely combines it with Gaston Leroux's novel, The Phantom of the Opera.

== Characters ==
- Batman: When he was a child, Bruce Wayne witnessed the death of his parents at the hand of a mugger. Years later, he protects Gotham City under the guise of the Batman. Recently, he has fallen for ballerina Laura Avian but is unsure if he can bring her into his world.
- The Phantom: Harvey Dent, once a proud and accomplished dancer, was horribly scarred on stage when his costume caught fire from one of the stagelights. He is now obsessed with Laura Avian and will do anything to make her happy, even to commit a murder.
- Laura Avian: Laura is a young and upcoming ballerina who is caught between her two loves. Bruce Wayne and the mysterious Phantom.
- Madame Juliana Sandoval: The reigning prima ballerina. Harvey injures her in an accident so Laura may receive the prima status.
- Mr. McCord and Mr. Fergusen: The managers. Harvey kills Fergusen in an accident so Laura may receive the prima status.

== Plot summary ==
In Gotham City, 1890 A.D., Bruce Wayne, a.k.a. the Batman, is called to Gotham Police Headquarters by Commissioner Gordon. He is informed that three men broke out of Gotham jail. Two were already caught, but the third has taken to the rooftops. As Batman chases after the third, the fight moves to the Gotham City Opera House, where a performance of Edgar Allan Poe's "The Masque of the Red Death" is being held. The main lead, Harvey Dent, is scarred in a horrible accident when his costume catches fire.

The same night, ballerina Laura Avian meets Bruce, who was friends with her father when they were in school. There is an instant attraction between the two, but Laura expresses some concern for Harvey after his accident. Bruce proposes that he could become a teacher since he can no longer dance, but Harvey is outraged at the notion. He believes that the only reason students would come would be to stare at his horribly scarred face.

As the love between Bruce and Laura grows, accidents begin to take place at the Opera House. Madame Sandoval, the prima ballerina, falls through a trapdoor and breaks her legs. The next night, Mr. Ferguson, one of the Opera managers, is crushed to death in a freak accident. Concerned for her well-being, Bruce begins to watch over Laura as Batman. The same night, Harvey meets with Laura in secret and teaches her how to become a better dancer, but he flees when she sees his face.

Following the night before the next performance of Red Death, Laura is nearly killed by two crooks when Batman saves her. He brings her to the Bat Cave, where she unmasks him as Bruce. He realizes that there is something sinister close to Laura, but she is not so concerned because she knows that Batman is watching her.

The night of Red Death's re-opening, Harvey kills Nicholas Varchenko, the leading male, and takes his place in the performance. There, he confesses his love to Laura, but Harvey and Batman get into a large fight that ends with Harvey bringing down the large chandelier above the opera stage, killing himself.

After being harassed by reporters, Laura flees to Wayne Manor. There, she tries to convince Bruce to give up his persona as Batman, but he cannot. He ends his relationship with her, realizing that her life is in danger every minute she is with him and that he truly belongs among the dark and the absurd.

== See also ==
- Adaptations of The Phantom of the Opera
- List of Elseworlds publications
