= The Witness for the Dead =

2021 novel by Katherine Addison

- Cover of first edition
- Author: Katherine Addison
- Audio read by: Liam Gerrard
- Language: English
- Series: Cemeteries of Amalo #1
- Genre: Fantasy of manners
- Publisher: Tom Doherty Associates
- Publication date: June 22, 2021
- Publication place: United States
- Media type: print (hardcover)
- Pages: 240
- ISBN: 978-0765387424 (hardcover 1st ed)
- OCLC: 1191199581
- Dewey Decimal: 813/.6
- LC Class: PS3601.D4655 W58 2021
- Preceded by: The Goblin Emperor
- Followed by: The Grief of Stones

The Witness for the Dead is a fantasy novel written by the American author Sarah Monette under the pseudonym Katherine Addison, set in the same world as her earlier novel The Goblin Emperor. The book was first published in hardcover and ebook by Tor Books in June 2021, with an audio version issued simultaneously by MacMillan Audio and narrated by Liam Gerrard; a British edition was issued in trade paperback and ebook by Solaris in July of the same year with Liam Gerrard again narrating the audiobook. The novel was well-received by critics.

== Plot ==
In the wake of his service for the emperor, the formerly disgraced Prelate of Ulis and Witness for the Dead, Thara Celehar resumes his duties in the city of Amalo, far from Court. Through his ability to communicate with the recently dead he resolves inheritance disputes, identifies nameless murder victims, and is sometimes able to bring justice to the latter by identifying their killers.

Currently, while trying to find a woman who has vanished, possibly killed by her husband, he is presented with a new case, discovering the identity of a recent drowning victim. The body turns out to be that of a popular but unsavory opera singer whose selfishness, thievery, penchant for blackmail and exploitation of her patrons has left scores of possible suspects. The missing woman, meanwhile, is found to be but the latest of several victims of an elusive serial killer who has been marrying and murdering heiresses for their fortunes.

Progress on these cases is stalled when Thara is tasked with resolving the matter of a forged will, and earns the enmity of the politically influential forger. For his own safety, the city's prince sends him out of town to deal with a ghoul manifestation in a remote village. Afterwards a trial by ordeal in the form of a night vigil in a haunted ruin clears Thara's political difficulties. In the course of these events he also reconciles an estranged grandfather and granddaughter and is called on to help investigate an airship explosion.

Finally the serial wife-slayer is found and arrested, while the issue of the will fortuitously leads to identification of the opera singer's killer. Thara himself, as a result of his interactions with the living necessitated by his witnessing for the dead, is able to resolve some issues from his past that have left him guilt-ridden and socially isolated.

== Reception ==
Publishers Weekly praises "Addison's steampunk-influenced scene-setting and assemblage of characters from all walks of life," observing that they "combine to create a vibrant fantasy world." The book is characterized as "more spin-off than sequel," and its story as "driven more by character than plot, with Celehar's personal and professional relationships, and unwavering duty to his calling as a Witness, taking center stage." The reviewer feels "returning fans and new readers alike will find it easy to be swept up in Celahar's story."

Elena Gleason in Booklist calls the book a "welcome return to the world of 2014's Locus Award-winner The Goblin Emperor, with "[t]he urban underbelly setting and myster plot ... giv[ing] it a very different tone from the imperial court intrigue of its predecessor. She notes that "[t]he story is an unusual blend of slice-of-life and murder mystery" with "just enough links between the murder investigation and several subplots to prevent the book from seeming disjointed." She concludes that "the simple pleasure of reading about a kind and quietly competent character who always aims to do the right thing will enchant fans of The Goblin Emperor and new readers alike."

Michelle West in The Magazine of Fantasy & Science Fiction writes "[t]his is a lovely book that focuses on one character in the Goblin Emperor's court," in which "[a]ll the mysteries come together by the book's end, and while I was happy to read their resolution, what I really read for -- and will reread for -- is Thara opening himself up, slowly and almost unaware, to the possibility that life holds more for is future than grief and guilt. ... [T]he only thing I wanted, at the end, was more."

Kate Macdonald in Strange Horizons assesses the novel as "an excellent novel, possibly scoring 4.5 out of 5, with The Goblin Emperor as a stunning 5, but it is in many ways more satisfying than its predecessor, simply because we find out so much more about this remarkable world. It is ... about compassion, and the societal bonds and obligations that make living in a civilised manner desirable for all." She notes that the author "place[es] emotional integrity at the centre of a plot that takes the reader forward rather than inward [in] novels [that] are empathy-rich fantasies which focus on how what people feel makes them act, not what they wield or how sharp or explosive it is." She concludes "The Witness for the Dead is a socially realistic fantasy underpinned by superb creative power, as emotionally satisfying as it is skillfully written."

The novel was nominated for the Locus Award for Best Fantasy Novel in 2022.

== Adaptations ==
Liam Gerrard narrated the audiobook version for Macmillan Publishers which was released in 2021.
