= Sarah Monette =

American novelist and short story writer (born 1974)

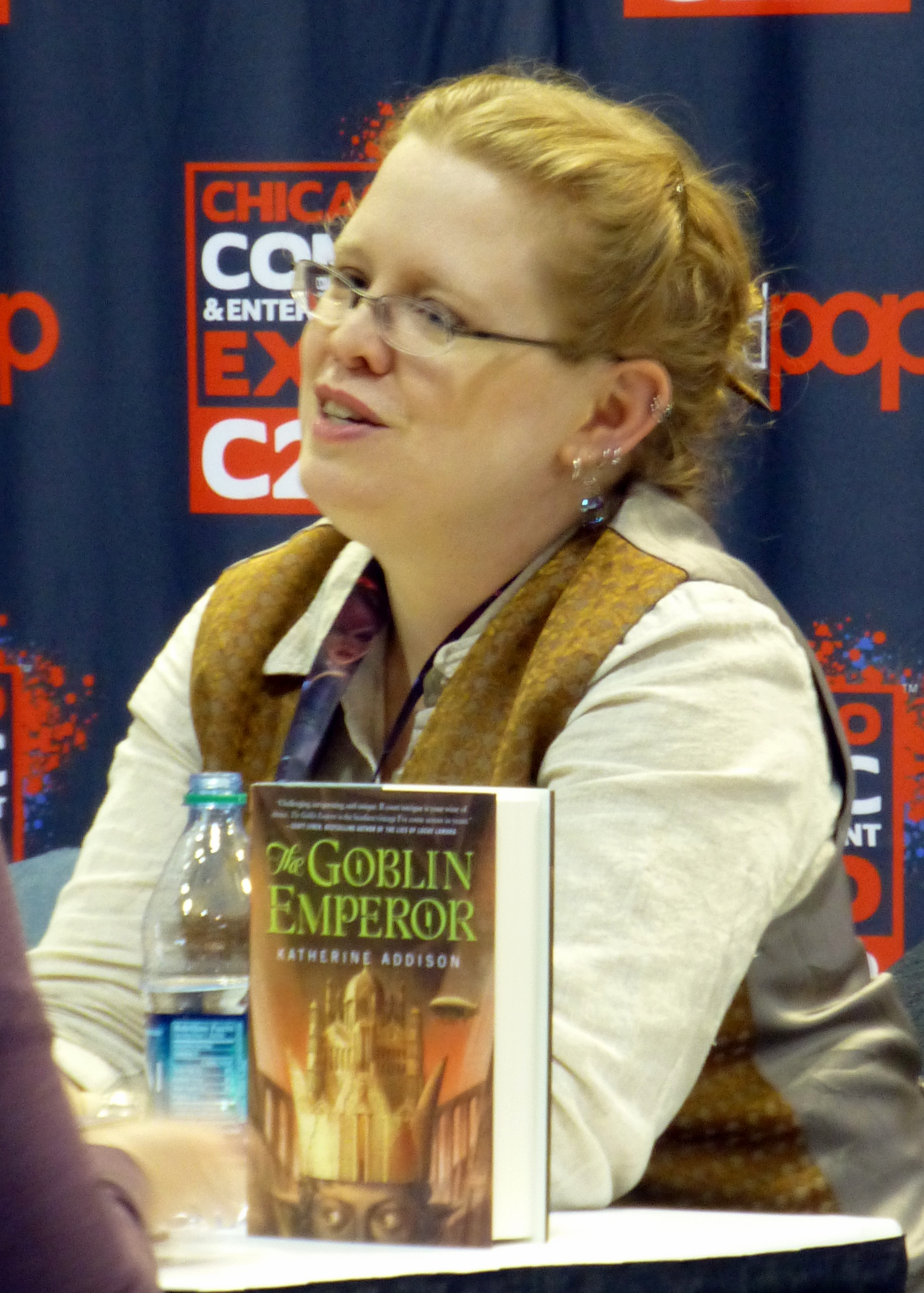
- Monette at the Chicago Comic & Entertainment Expo in 2014
- Born: November 25, 1974 (age 51); Oak Ridge, Tennessee, U.S.
- Education: Case Western Reserve University; University of Wisconsin–Madison (PhD)
- Occupation: Novelist
- Writing career
- Pen name: Katherine Addison
- Genre: Speculative fiction
- Notable works: Mélusine, The Goblin Emperor
- Notable awards: 2003 Gaylactic Spectrum Award, 2015 Locus Award for Best Fantasy Novel
- Website: www.sarahmonette.com

Sarah Elizabeth Monette (born November 25, 1974) is an American novelist and short story writer, mostly in the genres of fantasy and horror. Under the name Katherine Addison, she published the fantasy novel The Goblin Emperor, which received the Locus Award for Best Fantasy Novel and was nominated for the Nebula, Hugo and World Fantasy Awards.

== Early life ==
Monette was born in Oak Ridge, Tennessee, on November 25, 1974. She began writing at the age of 12.

Monette studied Classics, English, and French at Case Western Reserve University and graduated summa cum laude in 1996. She received her master's degree in 1997 and her Ph.D. in 2004, both in English literature at the University of Wisconsin–Madison. She specialized in Renaissance Drama and wrote her dissertation on ghosts in English Renaissance revenge tragedy.

== Career ==
Monette won the Spectrum Award in 2003 for her short story "Three Letters from the Queen of Elfland". Her first novel Mélusine was published by Ace Books in August 2005, earning starred reviews in Publishers Weekly and Booklist and a place in Locus's Recommended Reading list for 2005. The sequel, The Virtu, followed in July 2006, also earning starred reviews and making Locus's Recommended Reading lists for 2006.

Her short stories have been published in Strange Horizons, Alchemy, Postscripts, and Lady Churchill's Rosebud Wristlet, among other venues, and have received four Honorable Mentions from The Year's Best Fantasy and Horror, edited by Ellen Datlow, Gavin Grant, and Kelly Link. Her poem "Night Train: Heading West" appeared in The Year's Best Fantasy and Horror XIX, and a story she co-wrote with Elizabeth Bear, "The Ile of Dogges", appeared in The Year's Best Science Fiction: Thirty-Fourth Annual Collection, edited by Gardner Dozois, in 2007.

In 2007, she donated her archives to the department of Rare Books and Special Collections at Northern Illinois University.

Her 2014 novel The Goblin Emperor was published under the pseudonym Katherine Addison. The novel received the Locus Award for Best Fantasy Novel and was nominated for the Nebula, Hugo and World Fantasy Awards.

== Awards ==
| Year | Work | Award | Category | Result | Ref |
|---|---|---|---|---|---|
| 2003 | "Three Letters from the Queen of Elfland" | Gaylactic Spectrum Awards | Short Story | Won | |
| 2006 | Mélusine | Crawford Award | — | Shortlisted | |
| 2006 | Mélusine | James Tiptree Jr. Award | — | Shortlisted | |
| 2006 | Mélusine | John W. Campbell Award | — | Shortlisted | |
| 2006 | Mélusine | Locus Award | First Novel | Nominated—7th | |
| 2006 | Mélusine | SF Site Readers Poll | SF/Fantasy Book | Nominated—9th | |
| 2007 | A Companion to Wolves | Lambda Literary Award | Science Fiction / Fantasy / Horror | Shortlisted | |
| 2007 | Mélusine | John W. Campbell Award | — | Shortlisted | |
| 2007 | The Virtu | Gaylactic Spectrum Awards | Novel | Shortlisted | |
| 2007 | The Virtu | Locus Award | Fantasy Novel | Nominated—17th | |
| 2008 | The Bone Key | Shirley Jackson Award | Collection | Shortlisted | |
| 2009 | "Boojum" | Locus Award | Short Story | Nominated—3rd | |
| 2010 | "Mongoose" | Locus Award | Novelette | Nominated—11th | |
| 2010 | "White Charles" | Locus Award | Novelette | Nominated—35th | |
| 2011 | "After the Dragon" | Locus Award | Short Story | Nominated—14th | |
| 2011 | "After the Dragon" | WSFA Small Press Award | — | Shortlisted | |
| 2012 | Somewhere Beneath Those Waves | Locus Award | Collection | Nominated—15th | |
| 2012 | The Tempering of Men | David Gemmell Award | Legend Award | Preliminary Nominee | |
| 2013 | "Blue Lace Agate" | Locus Award | Short Story | Nominated—26th | |
| 2013 | "The Wreck of the "Charles Dexter Ward"" | Locus Award | Novelette | Nominated—12th | |
| 2014 | The Goblin Emperor | Goodreads Choice Awards | Fantasy | Nominated—16th | |
| 2014 | The Goblin Emperor | Nebula Award | Novel | Shortlisted | |
| 2015 | The Goblin Emperor | Hugo Award | Novel | Shortlisted | |
| 2015 | The Goblin Emperor | Locus Award | Fantasy Novel | Won | |
| 2015 | The Goblin Emperor | World Fantasy Award | Novel | Shortlisted | |
| 2015 | The Goblin Emperor | RUSA CODES Reading List | Fantasy | Won | |
| 2023 | The Grief of Stones | Locus Award | Fantasy Novel | Nominated | |
| 2026 | The Orb of Cairado | Locus Award | Novella | Finalist | |
| 2026 | The Chronicles of Osreth | Hugo Award | Series | Finalist | |

== Bibliography ==
=== Novels ===
==== Doctrine of Labyrinths series ====
- —— (2005). Mélusine (hardcover 1st ed.). New York: Ace Books. pp. 1–432. ISBN 9780441012862.
- —— (2006). The Virtu (hardcover 1st ed.). New York: Ace Books. pp. 1–439. ISBN 9780441014040.
- —— (2007). The Mirador (hardcover 1st ed.). New York: Ace Books. pp. 1–426. ISBN 9780441015009.
- —— (2009). Corambis (hardcover 1st ed.). New York: Ace Books. pp. 1–421. ISBN 9780441015962.

==== Iskryne series ====
- ——; Bear, Elizabeth (2007). A Companion to Wolves (hardcover ed.). Tor Books. pp. 1–302. ISBN 9780765318169.
- ——; Bear, Elizabeth (2011). The Tempering of Men (hardcover ed.). Tor Books. pp. 1–304. ISBN 9780765324702.
- ——; Bear, Elizabeth (2015). An Apprentice to Elves (hardcover ed.). Tor Books. pp. 1–336. ISBN 9780765324719.

==== The Chronicles of Osreth ====
Published as Katherine Addison

- —— (2014). The Goblin Emperor (hardcover ed.). Tor Books. pp. 1–446. ISBN 9780765326997.
- —— (2025). The Orb of Cairado (hardcover ed.). Subterranean Press. pp. 1–120. ISBN 9781645242130.

===== Cemeteries of Amalo trilogy =====
Published as Katherine Addison, set in the same world as The Goblin Emperor

- —— (2021). The Witness for the Dead (hardcover ed.). Tor Books. pp. 1–240. ISBN 9780765387424.
  - "Min Zemerin's Plan". Sunday Morning Transport.
- —— (2022). The Grief of Stones (hardcover ed.). Tor Books. pp. 1–249. ISBN 9781250813893.
- —— (2025). The Tomb of Dragons (hardcover ed.). Tor Books. pp. 1–352. ISBN 9781250816191.

==== Stand-alone novels ====
Published as Katherine Addison

- —— (2020). The Angel of the Crows (hardcover ed.). Tor Books. pp. 1–448. ISBN 9780765387394.

=== Collections ===
- The Bone Key (Prime Books, 2007)
- Somewhere Beneath Those Waves (Prime Books, 2011)

=== Short fiction ===
==== Kyle Murchison Booth ====
- "The Wall of Clouds" (Alchemy Magazine 1, December 2003)
- "The Inheritance of Barnabas Wilcox" (Lovecraft's Weird Mysteries 7, May 2004)
- "The Venebretti Necklace" (Alchemy Magazine 2, September 2004)
- "Bringing Helena Back" (All Hallows: The Journal of the Ghost Story Society 35, February 2004)
- "The Green Glass Paperweight" (Tales of the Unanticipated 25, August 2004)
- "Wait for Me" (Naked Snake Online, September 2004)
- "Elegy for a Demon Lover" (Tales of the Unanticipated 26, October 2005)
- "Drowning Palmer" (All Hallows: The Journal of the Ghost Story Society 41, February 2006)
- "The Bone Key" (SAY... What's the Combination?, May 2007)
- "Listening to Bone" (The Bone Key, Prime Books, 2007)
- "The World Without Sleep" (Postscripts, Spring 2008)
- "The Yellow Dressing Gown" (Weird Tales, March 2008)
- "The Replacement" (The Willows, September 2008)
- "White Charles" (Clarkesworld Magazine, September 2009)
- "Unnatural Creatures" (Unnatural Creatures, self-published, 2011)
- "To Die for Moonlight" (Apex Magazine, July 2013)
- "The Testimony of Dragon's Teeth" (Uncanny Magazine, March 2018)
- "The Haunting of Dr. Claudius Winterson" (Uncanny Magazine, January 2022)
- "A Theory of Haunting" (SOLARIS, 2023)

==== Boojum ====
- "Boojum" (with Elizabeth Bear) (Fast Ships, Black Sails, eds. Jeff and Ann VanderMeer, Night Shade Books, 2008)
- "Mongoose" (with Elizabeth Bear) (2009)
- "The Wreck of the Charles Dexter Ward" (with Elizabeth Bear) (2012)

Shadow Unit Episodes

- 1.03 "Dexterity"
- 1.05 "Ballistic" (with Emma Bull, Elizabeth Bear, and Amanda Downum)
- 3.00 "On Faith"
- 4.03 "Hope Is Stronger Than Love"

==== Other short fiction ====
- "Three Letters from the Queen of Elflands" (Lady Churchill's Rosebud Wristlet #11, November 2002)
- "Queen of Swords " (Alienskin Magazine #2.4, November 2003)
- "Sidhe Tigers" (Lady Churchill's Rosebud Wristlet #13, November 2003)
- "Straw " (Strange Horizons #28, June 2004)
- "The Half-Sister" (Lady Churchill's Rosebud Wristlet #15, January 2005)
- "The Séance at Chisholm End" (Alchemy Magazine #3, January 2006)
- "A Gift of Wings" The Queen in Winter Ace Books, 2006
- "The Ile of Dogges" (with Elizabeth Bear) (Aeon #7, May 2006)
- "A Night in Electric Squidland" (Lone Star Stories #15, June 2006)
- "Katabasis: Seraphic Trains" (Tales of the Unanticipated #27, July 2006)
- "National Geographic on Assignment: Mermaids of the Old West" (Fictitious Force #2, July 2006)
- "Draco campestris " (Strange Horizons, August 7, 2006)
- "Letter from a Teddy Bear on Veterans' Day" (Ideomancer 5.3, September 2006)
- "A Light in Troy" (Clarkesworld Magazine #1, October 2006)
- "Amante Dorée" (Paradox Magazine #10, Winter 2006/07)
- "The Watcher in the Corners" (author's blog, Notes from the Labyrinth, April 23, 2007)
- "Somewhere Beneath Those Waves Was Her Home" (Fantasy Magazine, July 2007)
- "Under the Beansidhe's Pillow" (Lone Star Stories #22, August 1, 2007)
- "Festival Lives, View 3: All God's Chillun Got Wings" (2008)
- "Darkness, as a Bride" (Cemetery Dance #58, February 2008)
- "Fiddleback Ferns" (Flytrap #9, June 2008)
- "Night Train: Heading West" (poem) (The Year's Best Fantasy & Horror: Nineteenth Annual Collection, August 2008)
- "Last Drink Bird Head" (2009)
- "After the Dragon" (Fantasy Magazine, January 2010)
- "Ashes, Ashes" (All Hallows: The Journal of the Ghost Story Society, 2011)
- "No Man's Land" (Fictitious Force, 2011)
- "The Devil in Gaylord's Creek" (2011)
- "Why Do You Linger?" (2011)
- "Absent from Felicity" (Somewhere Beneath Those Waves, 2011)
- "Impostors" (Somewhere Beneath Those Waves, 2011)
- "Blue Lace Agate" (2012)
- "Coyote Gets His Own Back" (2012)
- "The Half-Life of Angels" (2015)
- "Learning to See Dragons" (2017)
- "National Geographic on Assignment: The Unicorn Enclosure" (2017)
- "The Oracle of Abbey Road (Blackbird Singing in the Dead of Night)" (2018)
