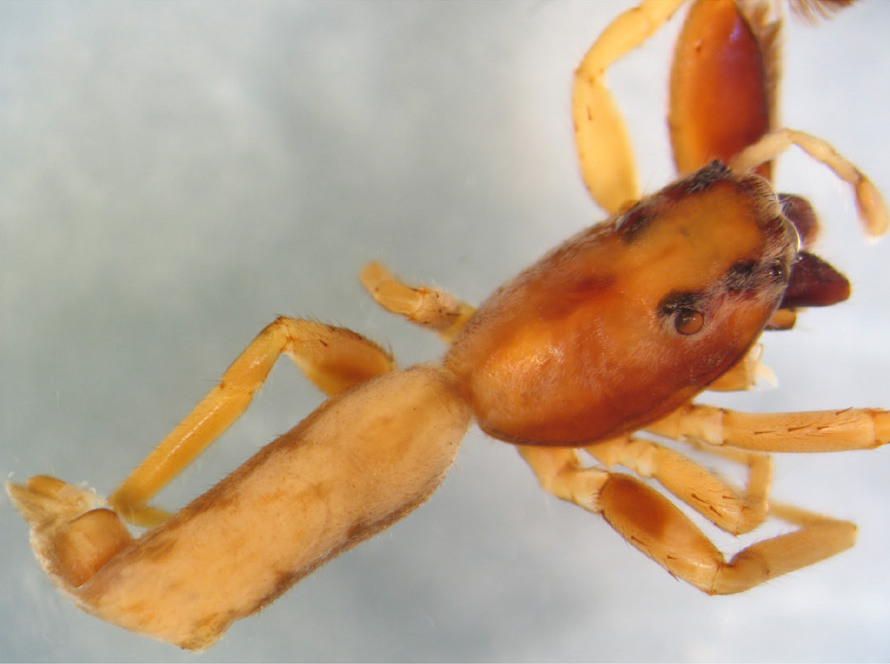
- Corambis insignipes

Scientific classification
- Kingdom: Animalia
- Phylum: Arthropoda
- Subphylum: Chelicerata
- Class: Arachnida
- Order: Araneae
- Infraorder: Araneomorphae
- Family: Salticidae
- Subfamily: Salticinae
- Genus: Corambis; Simon, 1901

Type species
- C. insignipes (Simon, 1880)

Species
- C. foeldvarii Szüts, 2002 – New Caledonia; C. insignipes (Simon, 1880) – New Caledonia, Loyalty Is.

= Corambis =

Genus of spiders

Corambis is a genus of South Pacific jumping spiders that was first described by Eugène Louis Simon in 1901. As of June 2019 it contains only two species, found only on the Loyalty Islands and New Caledonia: C. foeldvarii and C. insignipes.
