= The Tomb of Dragons =

2025 novel by Katherine Addison

- First edition
- Author: Katherine Addison
- Language: English
- Series: Cemeteries of Amalo #3
- Genre: fantasy of manners cozy fantasy
- Publisher: Tor Books
- Publication date: March 11, 2025
- Publication place: United States
- Media type: print (hardcover) ebook
- Pages: 345
- ISBN: 9781250816191 (hardcover 1st ed)
- Preceded by: The Grief of Stones

The Tomb of Dragons is a fantasy novel written by the American author Sarah Monette under the pseudonym Katherine Addison, and is the final entry in her Cemeteries of Amalo trilogy. The book was first published in hardcover and ebook by Tor Books in March 2025.

== Plot summary ==
Thara Celehar is no longer Amalo's Witness for the Dead after losing his gift for connecting with the memories of the deceased. Celehar slowly comes to terms with his new reality, mentoring his protege and untangling the workings of a non-functional city cemetery on behalf of the Archprelate.

A group of miners, who are being picked off by an unseen force deep in their mine, kidnap Celehar. Angry when they learn that he cannot help, they dump him in the mine. In the face of death, Celehar is suddenly, miraculously, able to communicate with the dead again. He encounters the spirit of a dragon, whose force has been preserved to maintain the memory of the genocide committed against her kind by the Clenverada Mining Company. She spares Celehar's life in exchange for his commitment to witness for the dragons.

Celehar escapes to the capital where he convinces the emperor to investigate the murder of the dragons. The royal accountants uncover treasonous activities by the Clenverada Mining Company; the company is nationalized and the Clenverada family disgraced. The emperor agrees to permanently close the mine that is the tomb of dragons.

Celehar travels with a company to seal the mine. On their return, their party is attacked by bandits who have been sent by the Clenverada in pursuit of revenge. He escapes along with his bodyguard and they commit to creating a new life together.

== Reception and awards ==
Library Journal said of the novel, "In theory, this series shouldn’t be cozy because Celehar has a knack for ending up in epically awful trouble, but he is such a cozy character, just getting the job done and taking each task as it comes to its conclusion. His self-effacing modesty makes him a delight to follow".

The critic Jake Casella Brookins complimented Addison for "deploying fantasy religion as genuinely and intriguingly as anyone in the field", but tempered that with a wish that the novels and their protagonist "could face the problems of that world more directly."

Liz Bourke, writing for Locus magazine, stated that "The prose, as ever with Addison, is beautifully composed, while the characters are painfully, compellingly human. It is a novel where the world is not always kind, nor always just, but where the characters strive for better. It is a piece of art that fed something in me that I had not known was hungry. I adore it."

The novel was a finalist for the 2026 Locus Award for Best Fantasy Novel.

== Adaptations ==
Liam Gerrard narrated the audiobook version for Macmillan Publishers which was released in 2025.
