= The Grief of Stones =

2022 novel by Katherine Addison

- First edition
- Author: Katherine Addison
- Language: English
- Series: Cemeteries of Amalo #2
- Genre: Fantasy of manners
- Publisher: Tom Doherty Associates
- Publication date: June 14, 2022
- Publication place: United States
- Media type: print (hardcover) ebook kindle
- Pages: 249
- ISBN: 9781250813893 (hardcover 1st ed)
- OCLC: 1263341933
- Dewey Decimal: 813/.6
- LC Class: PS3601.D4655 G75 2022
- Preceded by: The Witness for the Dead
- Followed by: The Tomb of Dragons

The Grief of Stones is a fantasy novel written by the American author Sarah Monette under the pseudonym Katherine Addison, set in the same world as her award-winning earlier novel The Goblin Emperor. The book was first published in hardcover and ebook by Tor Books in June 2022.

== Plot summary ==
The novel continues the story of Thara Celehar as Witness for the Dead in the city of Amalo, continuing the account begun in The Witness for the Dead. He investigates a new mystery, during which he acquires an apprentice and possible successor.

== Adaptations ==
Liam Gerrard narrated the audiobook version for Macmillan Publishers which was released in 2022.
