= Susan Kay =

British writer

- Born: 1952 (age 73–74); Manchester, England
- Occupation: Novelist
- Children: 2
- Writing career
- Pen name: Susan Kay
- Language: English
- Period: 1985–1990
- Genre: Historical fiction

Susan Kay (born 1952) is a British writer, the author of two award-winning novels: Legacy and Phantom.

== Biography ==
Kay was born on 1952 in Manchester, England. She worked as a primary school teacher until leaving to bring up a family, and now lives with her husband and two children in Cheshire.

== Works ==
Kay’s first novel was Legacy (1985), about the life of Queen Elizabeth I and won a Georgette Heyer Historical Novel Prize and a Betty Trask Award in 1985.

Her second novel, Phantom (1991), expands upon the history of Erik, the hideous, brilliant character from Gaston Leroux's The Phantom of the Opera, in an episodic format of seven chapters from different characters' points of view – first Erik's mother, immediately revolted by her own son; then Erik as a boy being exhibited as a circus freak; then Giovanni, a character of Kay's creation, who takes him in; then Nadir, known in Leroux's novel as the Persian, who is greatly expanded upon and gives an account of Erik in the bloodiest days of his life; then Erik, describing how he settled into his role as Phantom of the Opera; then a back-and-forth narrative between Erik and Christine Daaé, whom he loves obsessively; and lastly, Raoul de Chagny, Erik's rival, giving the denouement. She did not travel to Iran to research the novel, although she did research in person at the Paris Opera House. The novel won the Romantic Novel of the Year Award by the Romantic Novelists' Association in 1991.

== Bibliography ==
- Legacy (1985)
- Phantom (1990)
