= Phantom (Kay novel) =

1990 novel by Susan Kay

- First edition
- Author: Susan Kay
- Language: English
- Genre: Parallel novel
- Publisher: Doubleday
- Publication date: 1990
- Publication place: United Kingdom
- Media type: Print (Hardcover and Paperback)
- Pages: 532
- ISBN: 0-385-40087-X (hardcover first edition)
- OCLC: 21412105

Phantom is a 1990 novel by Susan Kay, based on the 1910 Gaston Leroux novel The Phantom of the Opera. It is a biography of the title character Erik.

== Plot summary ==
The Phantom is born as Erik in Boscherville, a small town not far from Rouen, in the summer of 1831. His spoiled, vain mother scorns her deformed child from birth, puts a mask on his face, and cannot bring herself to name him. Instead, she instructs the elderly priest who baptises him to name the child after himself. Erik is forced to spend his childhood locked in his home lest he or his mother become a target for the superstitious villagers. Much of the verbal and physical abuse Erik suffers from his mother is chronicled in the opening chapters of the novel.

From a young age, Erik exhibits a strong interest in architecture and is privately tutored by a well-respected professor, but his strongest abilities lie in the subject of music. His mother does not encourage his pursuit of singing, claiming that his supernaturally beautiful voice cannot have been created by God.

At nine years old, Erik runs away from home, believing this will make his mother's life easier. After a week or so without food, he stumbles upon a Romani Gypsy camp in the woods. Upon seeing his face, a freak show showman named Javert decides to exhibit him as the "Living Corpse" and Erik is locked in a cage. He remains with the tribe until he is about 12 years old, when the showman drunkenly attempts to force himself on him, at which point Erik kills him and is forced to flee.

While performing at a fair in Rome, Erik meets Giovanni, a master mason who takes the boy on as his apprentice. He stays with Giovanni until age 15, when Erik is forced to flee again after inadvertently causing the death of Giovanni's daughter Luciana.

Four years later, he is sought out by Nadir, the Daroga of Mazanderan Court and becomes a court assassin, magician, and personal engineer to the Persian Shah. Responsible for the entertainment of the Khanum, the Shah's mother, he builds sophisticated traps and torture devices for her amusement. In addition, he is involved in the design and construction of a palace for the Shah. After becoming involved in political intrigue, Erik makes his way back to France, where he helps design and build the Palais Garnier Opera House.

The rest of the book loosely follows the original novel The Phantom of the Opera, though the relationship between Christine and Erik is explored in greater detail and with greater compassion than the original novel.

== Characters ==
- Erik, the main character, a hideously deformed young man
- Madeleine, Erik's spoiled and vain mother
- Javert, master of a Romani Gypsy tribe who exhibits Erik as a circus freak
- Giovanni, an elderly Italian master stonemason, who discovers Erik on one of his sites one morning, and takes him on as an apprentice
- Luciana, Giovanni's youngest daughter
- Nadir Khan, known in Leroux's book only as "The Persian", is Erik's only friend
- Reza, Nadir's young son, who is dying from Tay–Sachs disease
- The Persian Shah is the ruler of Persia (by the book's chronology probably Naser al-Din Shah Qajar)
- The khanum, referred to as the Sultana or "the little sultana" in Leroux's book. She develops a great lust for Erik. (Historically the Mahd-i Ulya at this time was Malek Jahan Khanom.)
- Christine Daaé, the beautiful young Swedish chorus girl whom Erik meets at the Paris Opera
- Charles, the son of Christine and Erik, born around 1881
- Raoul, Vicomte de Chagny, Christine's childhood friend and later her husband
- La Carlotta, the bratty Spanish diva of the Opera Garnier
- Madame Giry, Erik's loyal box-keeper and mother of Meg Giry
- Meg Giry, a ballet dancer and the daughter of Madame Giry
- Debienne and Poligny, the old managers of the Opera Garnier
- Moncharmin and Richard, the new managers of the Opera House, though they know little about opera itself
- Sasha, Erik's boyhood pet dog, a golden spaniel who was murdered by a mob
- Ayesha, a Siamese cat Erik adopted on the streets of Paris during the 1871 Commune

== Release details ==
For several years, Phantom was out of print, and was only available on the secondary market. After the film version of Phantom Of The Opera was released in 2004, interest in the fandom—and prices for the book—rose dramatically. The novel was reprinted in October 2005 by Llumina Press.

In Sweden the novel was only printed once, which makes it rather rare. In the Swedish translation by Lena Torndahl, the whole sequence involving Christine finding a gigantic spider on her pillow and begging Erik (who has throughout the novel compared himself to a spider) to kill it has been cut.

Hardcover:

- Delacorte Press, 1991, ISBN 0-385-30296-7
- Llumina Stars, 2005, ISBN 978-1933626031

Paperback:

- Island Books, 1992, ISBN 0-440-21169-7
- Llumina Press, 2005, ISBN 978-1933626000

Ebook

- Llumina Press, 2010, ISBN 978-1-60594-8454
