= Claire Cross =

British historian

Professor M. C. Cross FSA FRHistS
- Born: 1932 (age 93–94)

Academic background
- Education: University of Cambridge

Academic work
- Discipline: History
- Institutions: University of Reading; University of York

M. Claire Cross FSA FRHistS is a British historian and professor emeritus in history at the University of York. She was president of the Ecclesiastical History Society from 1989 to 1990.

== Education ==
Cross studied at the University of Cambridge before becoming county archivist for Cambridgeshire. Cross also studied at the Huntingdon Library in California, then held a research fellowship at the University of Reading before becoming lecturer at the University of York (1965-2000).

== Career ==
In 1958, Cross was appointed the County Archivist for Cambridgeshire.

Cross was a visiting fellow at Girton College, Cambridge from 1990 to 1991. She was president of the Ecclesiastical History Society from 1989 to 1990 and the Society presented her with a festschrift, Life and Thought in the Northern Church, c.1100-1700 in 1999 and made her an honorary fellow in 2000. Cross was chair and later vice-president of the British Association for Local History.

== Awards and recognition ==
Cross was elected a fellow of the Society of Antiquaries, Royal Historical Society, Historical Association, and was awarded an honorary D.Litt. by the University of Lincoln.

== Publications ==
- Church and people, 1450-1660 : the triumph of the laity in the English church (Atlantic Highlands, N.J.: Humanities Press, 1976; second edition 1999)
- The royal supremacy in the Elizabethan Church (London, Allen & Unwin; New York, Barnes & Noble, 1969)
- (and D. M. Loades, J. J. Scarisbrick), Law and government under the Tudors: essays presented to Sir Geoffrey Elton, Regius Professor of Modern History in the University of Cambridge, on the occasion of his retirement (Cambridge; New York: Cambridge University Press, 1988)
- The puritan Earl: the life of Henry Hastings, third Earl of Huntingdon, 1536-1595 (London, Melbourne Macmillan; New York, St. Martin's P., 1966)
- Urban magistrates and ministers: religion in Hull and Leeds from the Reformation to the Civil War (Borthwick Papers No. 67, York: University of York, 1985).
- The Free Grammar School of Leicester (Leicester University Press, 1953)
- The Letters of Sir Francis Hastings, 1574-1609, Somerset Record Society (1969)
- York Clergy Wills 1520-1600: 1 The Minster Clergy, Borthwick Texts and Calendars: Records of the Northern Province, 10 (York, 1984).
- York Clergy Wills 1520-1600: 2. The City Clergy, Borthwick Texts and Calendars: Records of the Northern Province 15 (York, 1989).

Professional and academic associations
Preceded by Owen Chadwick	President of the Ecclesiastical History Society; 1989–90	Succeeded by Clyde Binfield
