= Don Juan =

Fictional libertine

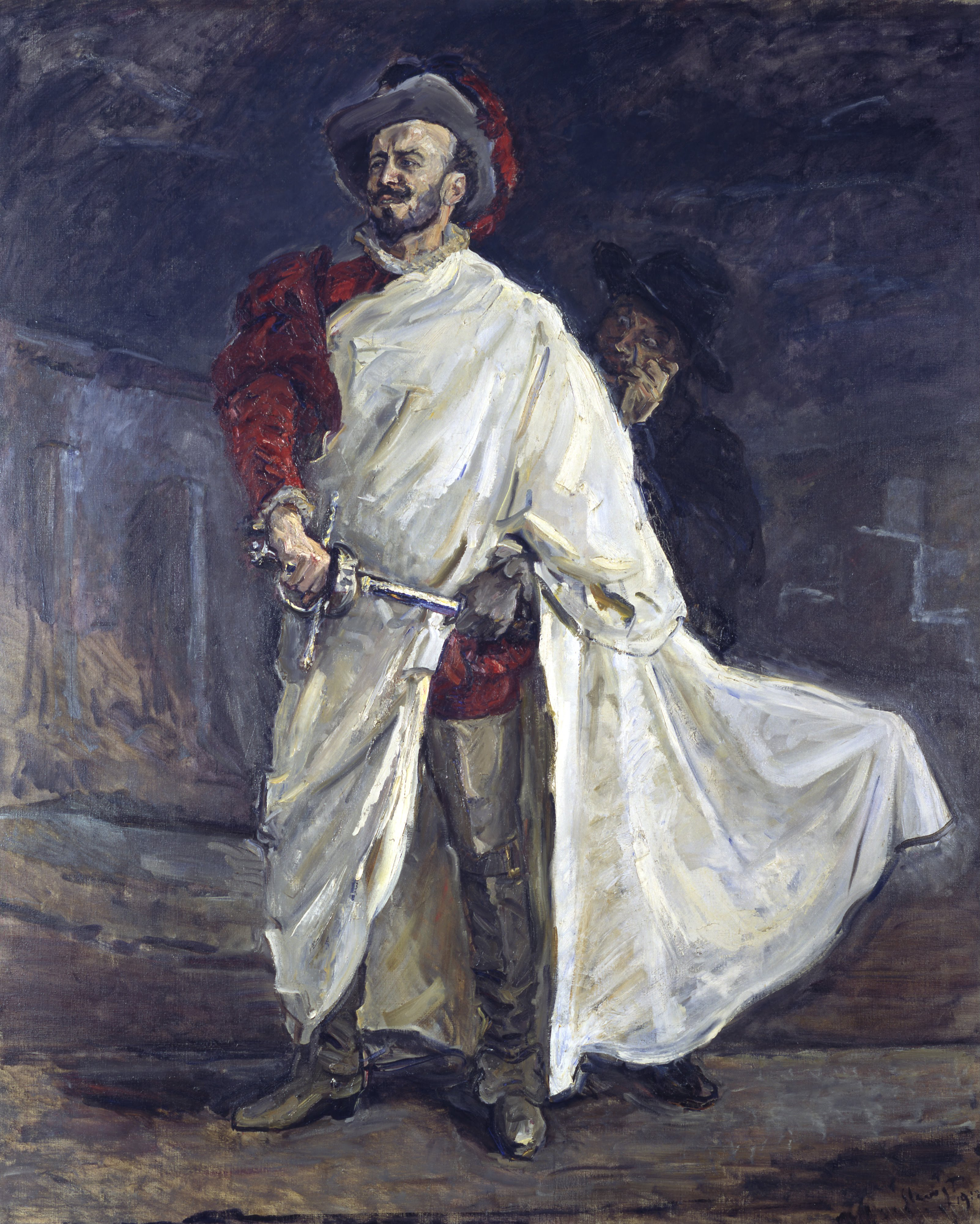
- Don Juan in Mozart's opera Don Giovanni, a painting by Max Slevogt
- First appearance: El burlador de Sevilla y convidado de piedra; 1630
- Created by: Tirso de Molina

In-universe information
- Nationality: Spanish

Don Juan (Spanish: [doŋ ˈxwan]), also known as Don Giovanni (Italian), is a legendary fictional Spanish libertine who devotes his life to seducing women.

The original version of the story of Don Juan appears in the 1630 play El burlador de Sevilla y convidado de piedra (The Trickster of Seville and the Stone Guest) by Tirso de Molina. The play includes most of the elements found and later adapted in subsequent works, including the setting (Seville), the characters (Don Juan, his servant, his love interest, and her father, whom he kills), moralistic themes (honor, violence and seduction, vice and retribution), and the dramatic, supernatural ending in which Don Juan dines with and is then dragged down to hell by the stone statue of the father he had previously slain. Tirso de Molina's play was subsequently adapted into numerous plays and poems, of which the most famous include a 1665 play, Dom Juan, by Molière; a 1787 opera, Don Giovanni, with music by Mozart and a libretto by Lorenzo da Ponte largely adapting Tirso de Molina's play; a satirical and epic poem, Don Juan, by Lord Byron; and Don Juan Tenorio, a romantic play by José Zorrilla.

By linguistic extension, from the name of the character, "Don Juan" has become a generic expression for a womanizer, and stemming from this, Don Juanism is a non-clinical psychiatric descriptor.

== Pronunciation ==
In Spanish, it is pronounced [doŋˈxwan]. The usual US English pronunciation is /ˌdɒnˈwɑːn/, with two syllables and a silent "J", but today, as more English-speakers are becoming influenced by Spanish, the pronunciation /ˌdɒnˈhwɑːn/ is becoming more common. However, in Lord Byron's verse version the name rhymes with ruin and true one, and traditionally the name was pronounced with three syllables, possibly /ˌdɒnˈʒuːən/ or /ˌdɒnˈdʒuːən/, in England at the time and by later critics. This would have been characteristic of English literary precedent, where English pronunciations were often imposed on Spanish names, such as Don Quixote /ˌdɒnˈkwɪksət/.

== Synopsis ==
There have been many versions of the Don Juan story, but the basic outline remains the same: Don Juan is a wealthy Andalusian libertine who devotes his life to seducing women. He takes great pride in his ability to seduce women of all ages and stations in life, and he often disguises himself and assumes other identities in order to seduce women. The aphorism that Don Juan lives by is: "Tan largo me lo fiáis" (translated as "What a long term you are giving me!"). This is his way of indicating that he is young and that death is still distant—he thinks he has plenty of time to repent later for his sins.

His life is also punctuated with violence and gambling, and in most versions he kills a man: Don Gonzalo (the Commendatore), the father of Doña Ana, a girl he has seduced. This murder leads to the famous "last supper" scene, where Don Juan invites a statue of Don Gonzalo to dinner. There are different versions of the outcome: in some versions Don Juan dies, having been denied salvation by God; in other versions he willingly goes to Hell, having refused to repent; in some versions Don Juan asks for and receives a divine pardon.

== Earliest written version ==
The first written version of the Don Juan story was a play, El burlador de Sevilla y convidado de piedra (The Trickster of Seville and the Stone Guest), published in Spain around 1630 by Tirso de Molina (pen name of Gabriel Téllez).

In Tirso de Molina's version Don Juan is portrayed as an evil man who seduces women thanks to his ability to manipulate language and disguise his appearance. This is a demonic attribute, since the devil is known for shape-shifting or taking other peoples' forms. In fact Tirso's play has a clear moralizing intention. Tirso felt that young people were throwing their lives away, because they believed that as long as they made an Act of Contrition before they died, they would automatically receive God's forgiveness for all the wrongs they had done, and enter into heaven. Tirso's play argues in contrast that there is a penalty for sin, and there are even unforgivable sins. The devil himself, who is identified with Don Juan as a shape-shifter and a "man without a name", cannot escape eternal punishment for his unforgivable sins. As in a medieval Danse Macabre, death makes us all equal in that we all must face eternal judgment. Tirso de Molina's theological perspective is quite apparent through the dreadful ending of his play.

Another aspect of Tirso's play is the cultural importance of honor in Spain of the golden age. This was particularly focused on women's sexual behavior, in that if a woman did not remain chaste until marriage, her whole family's honor would be devalued.

== Later versions ==
The original play was written in the Spanish Golden Age according to its beliefs and ideals. But as time passed, the story was translated into other languages, and it was adapted to accommodate cultural changes.

Other well-known versions of Don Juan are Molière's play Dom Juan ou le Festin de pierre (1665), Antonio de Zamora's play No hay plazo que no se cumpla, ni deuda que no se pague, y Convidado de piedra (1722), Goldoni's play Don Giovanni Tenorio (1735), José de Espronceda's poem El estudiante de Salamanca (1840), and José Zorrilla's romantic play Don Juan Tenorio (1844). Don Juan Tenorio is still performed throughout the Spanish-speaking world on 2 November ("All Souls Day", the Day of the Dead).

Mozart's opera Don Giovanni has been called "the opera of all operas". First performed in Prague in 1787, it inspired works by E. T. A. Hoffmann, Alexander Pushkin, Søren Kierkegaard, George Bernard Shaw, and Albert Camus. The critic Charles Rosen analyzes the appeal of Mozart's opera in terms of "the seductive physical power" of a music linked with libertinism, political fervor, and incipient Romanticism. After seeing a performance of Mozart's opera, Pushkin wrote a story in the form of a play, not intended for the stage, "The Stone Guest" (Каменный гость) in a series "The Little Tragedies" (1830). Alexander Dargomyzhsky composed an opera using the exact text of Pushkin for the libretto (unfinished at the composer's death 1869, completed by César Cui, 1872).

The first English version of Don Juan was The Libertine (1676) by Thomas Shadwell. A revival of this play in 1692 included songs and dramatic scenes with music by Henry Purcell. Another well-known English version is Lord Byron's epic poem Don Juan (1821).

Don Juans Ende, a play derived from an unfinished 1844 retelling of the tale by poet Nikolaus Lenau, inspired Richard Strauss's orchestral tone poem Don Juan. This piece premiered on 11 November 1889, in Weimar, Germany, where Strauss served as Court Kapellmeister and conducted the orchestra of the Weimar Opera. In Lenau's version of the story, Don Juan's promiscuity springs from his determination to find the ideal woman. Despairing of ever finding her, he ultimately surrenders to melancholy and wills his own death.

In the film Adventures of Don Juan starring Errol Flynn (1948), Don Juan is a swashbuckling lover of women who also fights against the forces of evil.

In 1951 the Brazilian writer Guilherme Figueiredo wrote a play entitled Don Juan.

In 1952, the Spanish writer Jacinto Benavente published his play Ha llegado Don Juan.

The French play La Mort qui fait le trottoir, by Henry de Montherlant, premiered in 1958: it follows an aging Don Juan, depicted as an unusually benevolent and somewhat grotesque figure. In that version Don Juan eventually comes to terms with his own physical decline and, in a break from tradition, escapes punishment to be redeemed by a young woman's love.

Don Juan is a main character in The Devil's Eye (Swedish: Djävulens öga), a 1960 Swedish comedy film written and directed by Ingmar Bergman.

The Spanish writer Gonzalo Torrente Ballester told his version of the legend in the 1963 novel Don Juan.

Don Juan in Tallinn (1971) is an Estonian film version based on a play by Samuil Aljošin. In this version, Don Juan is a woman dressed in men's clothes. She is accompanied by her servant Florestino on her adventure in Tallinn, the capital of Estonia.

In Don Juan, or If Don Juan Were a Woman (1973), a French-Italian co-production, Brigitte Bardot plays a female version of the character.

Don Juan DeMarco (1995), starring Johnny Depp and Marlon Brando, is a film in which a mental patient is convinced he is Don Juan, and retells his life story to a psychiatrist.

Don Jon (2013), a film set in New Jersey of the 21st century, features an attractive young man whose addiction to online pornography is compared to his girlfriend's consumerism.

== Cultural influence ==
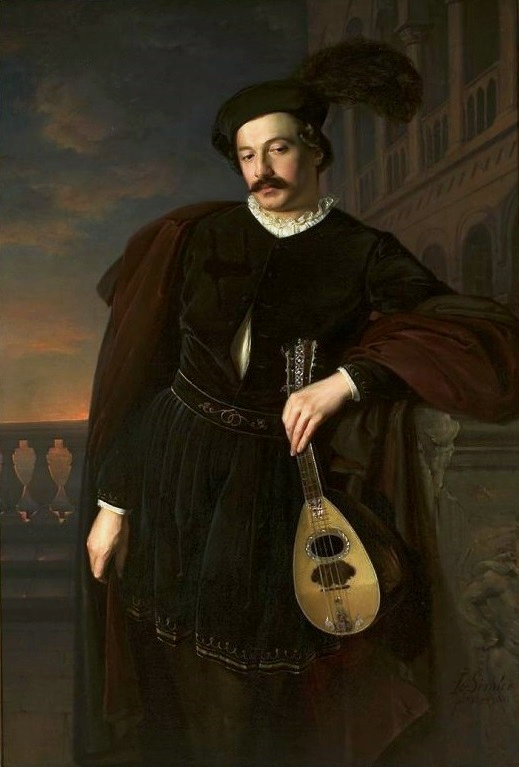
Portrait of Wilhelm Troszel as Don Juan, by Józef Simmler, 1846

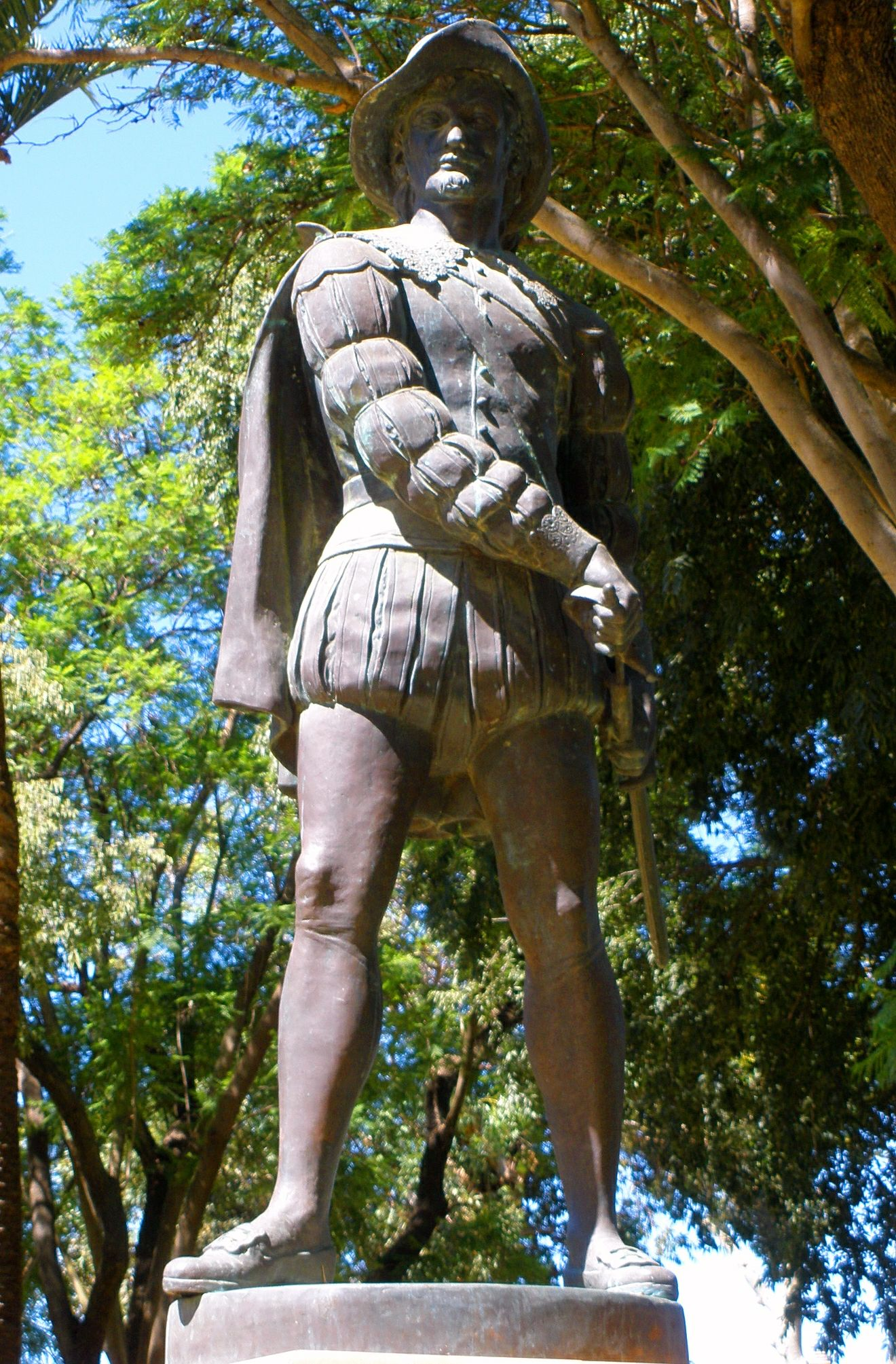
Monument to Don Juan Tenorio in Dos Hermanas, Seville

Don Juan fascinated the 19th-century English novelist Jane Austen: "I have seen nobody on the stage who has been a more interesting Character than that compound of Cruelty and Lust".

The Danish philosopher Søren Kierkegaard discussed Mozart's version of the Don Juan story at length in his 1843 treatise Either/Or.

In 1901, Finnish composer Jean Sibelius wrote the second movement of his second symphony based on the climax of Don Juan. The piece begins with a representation of Death walking up the road to Don Juan's house, where Don Juan pleads with Death to let him live. Also, the 1905 novel The Song of the Blood-Red Flower by the Finnish author Johannes Linnankoski has been influenced by Don Juan along the protagonist of the story.

The protagonist of Shaw's 1903 Man and Superman is a modern-day Don Juan named not Juan Tenorio but John Tanner. The actor playing Tanner morphs into his model in the mammoth third act, usually called Don Juan in Hell and often produced as a separate play due to its length. In it, Don Juan (played by Charles Boyer in a noted 1950s recording) exchanges philosophical barbs with the devil (Charles Laughton).

In the 1910 French novel The Phantom of the Opera by Gaston Leroux, the titular character (also known as Erik) had spent much of his life writing an opera, Don Juan Triumphant, refusing to play it for Christine Daaé and telling her that it was unlike any music she ever heard and that when it was complete, he would die with it, never sharing it with mankind. Following the unmasking scene, Erik refers to himself as Don Juan as he confronts Christine, verbally and physically abusing her as he uses her hands to gouge his face, exclaiming "When a woman has seen me – as you have – she becomes mine ... I'm a real Don Juan ... Look at me! I'm Don Juan Triumphant!"

In 1911, Ukrainian writer Lesya Ukrainka wrote poetic drama The Stone Host about Don Juan. As the author herself determined, it's about the victory of the conservative principle over the split soul of Donna Anna, and through her – over Don Juan. The traditional seducer of women became a victim of the woman who had broken his will.

In Spain, the first three decades of the twentieth century saw more cultural fervor surrounding the Don Juan figure than perhaps any other period. In one of the most provocative pieces to be published, the endocrinologist Gregorio Marañón argued that, far from the paragon of masculinity he was often assumed to be, Don Juan actually suffered from an arrested psychosexual development.

During the 1918 influenza epidemic in Spain, the figure of Don Juan served as a metaphor for the flu microbe.

The mid-20th-century French author Albert Camus referred to Don Juan in his 1942 essay The Myth of Sisyphus. Camus describes Don Juan as an example of an "absurd hero", as he maintains a reckless abandon in his approach to love. His seductive lifestyle "brings with it all the faces in the world, and its tremor comes from the fact that it knows itself to be mortal". He "multiplies what he cannot unify ... It is his way of giving and vivifying".

In the 1956 Buddy Holly single "Modern Don Juan", the singer gains a reputation for being like the libertine in his pursuit of a romantic relationship.

Swedish film director Ingmar Bergman wrote and directed a comic sequel in 1960 titled The Devil's Eye in which Don Juan, accompanied by his servant, is sent from Hell to contemporary Sweden to seduce a young woman before her marriage.

Anthony Powell in his 1960 novel Casanova's Chinese Restaurant contrasts Don Juan, who "merely liked power" and "obviously did not know what sensuality was", with Casanova, who "undoubtedly had his sensuous moments". Stefan Zweig observes the same difference between both characters in his biography of "Casanova".

in 1970 Faroese author William Heinesen released his short story "Don Juan fra Tranhuset", in which a character embodying Don Juan is washed up on the Faroe Islands in Torshavn and begins to seduce the women of that town.

In 1977, Joni Michell released Don Juan's Reckless Daughter, an experimental, jazz-influenced, double album. For the lyrics of the title track, Mitchell writes, "There is danger and education in living out such a reckless life style."

Don Juan is mentioned in the 1980 Broadway musical adaptation of Victor Hugo's 1862 novel Les Misérables, in which the character Grantaire states that Marius Pontmercy is acting like Don Juan.

In the 1986 Broadway musical adaptation of Gaston Leroux's 1910 The Phantom of the Opera, the character of the Phantom writes an opera based on the legend of Don Juan called Don Juan Triumphant.

in 1988 English synth-pop duo Pet Shop Boys published the song Don Juan as a b-side of their hit single Domino Dancing. The song's eponymous protagonist is considered as a metaphor for Adolf Hitler.

Don Juan is also a plot point in Susan Kay's novel Phantom, which expands on Gaston Leroux's novel The Phantom of the Opera. The titular character was referred to as "Don Juan" in his childhood, a nickname given to him by Javert, a man who exploited Erik as a child. Later in life, he began writing Don Juan Triumphant, spending decades on the piece, which Christine Daaé heard after hiding in her room after removing Erik's mask.

The former Thai Queen Sirikit once told reporters that her son Crown Prince Vajiralongkorn, now King Rama X, was "a bit of a Don Juan".

Don Juan is referenced in Star Trek the Original Series, season one episode 16 "Shore Leave".

"Don Juan" is Cockney rhyming slang for a 2:1 degree classification.

Rapper Future referenced Don Juan in the title and lyrics of his song Magic Don Juan (Princess Diana) on his 2024 album We Don't Trust You.

== Folkloristics ==
In folklore studies, the theme of a human living recklessly inviting a dead person or skull for dinner is classified in the Aarne-Thompson-Uther Index as ATU 470A, "The Offended Skull".

== See also ==
- Don Juanism
- Giacomo Casanova
- Latin lover
