= Don Juan Triumphant =

Fictional opera from The Phantom of the Opera

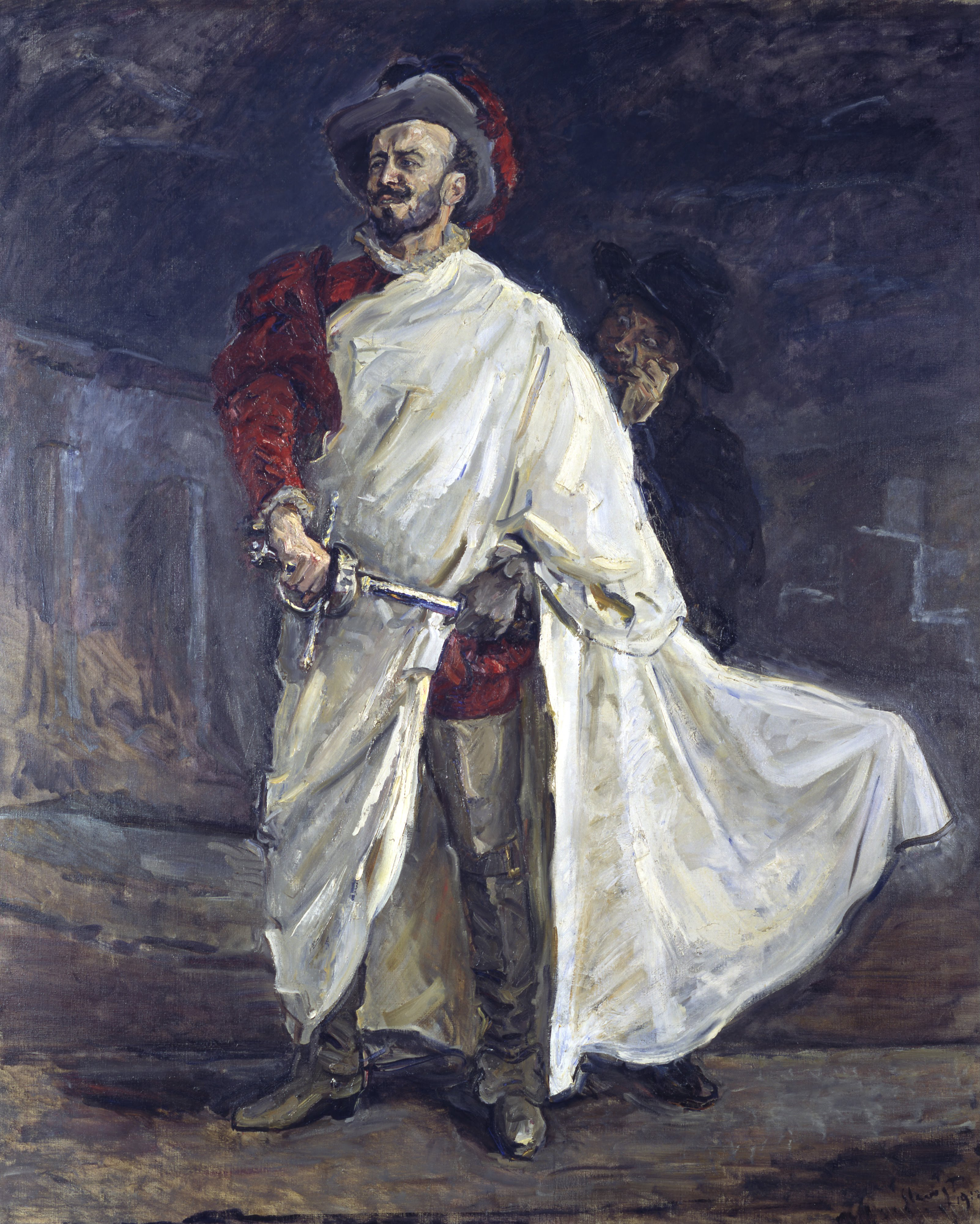
Don Juan in Mozart's opera Don Giovanni, a painting by Max Slevogt

Don Juan Triumphant is a fictional opera described in Gaston Leroux's 1909 novel The Phantom of the Opera. In the novel, it is conceived as the magnum opus of the titular character, and is a work in progress for most of the story, only being completed shortly before the ending. The fictional piece draws major inspiration from Wolfgang Amadeus Mozart's Don Giovanni, yet the Phantom's opera is depicted as far more bleak and dark.

In the 1986 musical The Phantom of the Opera by Andrew Lloyd Webber, the concept is expanded as an opera within a musical and the performance of it plays a major role in Act II of the storyline.

== The novel ==
In the novel The Phantom of the Opera by novelist Gaston Leroux, Don Juan Triumphant (French: Don Juan triomphant) is an initially unfinished piece that Erik, the Phantom, has been working on for a period of over twenty years. At one point, he remarks that once he completes it, he will take the score into the coffin he uses for a bed and simply never wake up. Erik plays a section of his opera following his unmasking at the hands of Christine Daaé, who is stunned by the power of the music. As she describes it, the music takes the listener through every detail of suffering of "the ugly man," taking her into the abyss of the wretched torment and misery Erik has experienced in his life. The piece, in Daaé's view, makes pain divine. At the end, it takes a rapid ascent out of misery whirling up into a triumphant and victorious flight as 'ugliness', lifted on the wings of love, dared to look 'beauty' in the face.

Erik's choice of title and use of "Don Juan" is never truly explained, so it remains subject to various interpretations. Initially, when Christine sees the score and asks him to play it for her, Erik gets highly defensive and tells her never to ask him that again. The Phantom remarks that she is lucky not to come to that kind of music yet, as his Don Juan "burns" with fire not from heaven and would consume anyone who came near it, whereas Mozart's and Lorenzo da Ponte's original Don Giovanni, inspired by vice and love affairs fueled by pettiness, will only make one "weep". After the Phantom is unmasked and his hideousness is revealed, Erik spitefully, and probably sarcastically, remarks that he is the same kind of man as Don Juan, because once a woman sees him, she loves him forever. He yells to her that he is "Don Juan triumphant". Eventually he crawls into his room to play his masterpiece to "forget the horror of the moment." Christine is so moved by what she hears that for a fleeting moment she believes that his hideous appearance no longer matters, although her opinion soon changes.

Erik finishes Don Juan Triumphant before the novel's end, and, instead of just automatically taking it with him into his coffin to die like he had originally said, he then wants instead to live a normal life doing normal things, with a wife, like everyone else. Earlier he is shown exclaiming that it "must be finished first!" with a sense of urgency. It seems to suggest that in Christine he saw hope of a new life, distinct from the darkness and passionate misery with which Don Juan Triumphant was created, and which had defined his life up until that point.

While the Phantom clearly resolves to finish the piece, seeing it still as a major achievement, he passes away before he can reveal it to the world. The novel's narrator comments that the work was never found in the thirty years since Erik's death and speculates that it may still be in his house next to the subterranean lake beneath the Paris Opera.

== The musical ==
In The Phantom of the Opera by Andrew Lloyd Webber, Don Juan Triumphant figures prominently in the second act as an opera within a musical. It is, as in the novel, a thinly veiled adaptation of Wolfgang Amadeus Mozart's Don Giovanni, retold from Don Juan's point of view. It is one of three fictional operas invented for the characters to present, alongside Hannibal, about the Carthaginian general returning to his beloved wife ("Overture"/"Think Of Me"), and Il Muto, about the Queen of France cheating with a mute pageboy ("Poor Fool he Makes me Laugh"). Excerpts from Don Juan Triumphant feature across "Notes (reprise)" and "Bravo, Bravo", with "The Point of no Return" as a largely unbroken song from the piece. "Here, Lloyd Webber pastiched various styles from the grand operas of Meyerbeer through to Mozart and even Gilbert and Sullivan." These pieces are often presented as musical fragments, interrupted by dialogue or action sequences in order to clearly define the musical's "show within a show" format.

In Webber's version, the Phantom forces the opera company to stage his work and orders Christine, a Swedish soprano and his protégée with whom he is in love, to be cast in the lead role. She reluctantly agrees to do so only after her fiancé, Raoul, devises a plan to catch the Phantom during the opening night performance. The score of Don Juan Triumphant is noticeably different from the style and staging of the rest of the piece and the operas the company perform on stage. It is dark, dissonant, and modern—"suggesting, perhaps, that the Phantom is ahead of his time artistically".

Only a small portion of the opera is seen onstage, in which Don Juan (played by leading tenor Ubaldo Piangi) and his servant Passarino make plans for Don Juan's seduction of the maiden Aminta (Christine). The two men have traded identities; Passarino (dressed as Don Juan) has already met Aminta and invited her to dinner. Don Juan (dressed as Passarino) is to meet Aminta and dine with her instead, during which "Don Juan" will loudly announce his return and "Passarino" will suggest that he and Aminta hide in a bedroom to avoid being found. As soon as Piangi slips into a hiding place to await the start of the scene, he is quietly strangled by the Phantom, who usurps him and sings "The Point of No Return" with Christine before declaring his love in front of the whole audience. The opera breaks up into chaos when she exposes his horribly deformed face and Piangi's body is found, leading to the finale of the musical ("Down Once More"/"Track Down This Murderer").

In the 2004 film adaptation of the musical, the audience at the opera house is seen recoiling in shock at the jarring discordance and staging of Don Juan Triumphant, which is very different from the traditional opera stagings they are used to. The costumes of the actors are also more sexualized than that in the stage show, being depicted as more form-flattering and tighter. Christine's dress, for example, changes from the low cut pink dress of the show to a sleeveless Spanish-style dress, complete with a flower in her hair. The Phantom's costume has varied considerably as well. In the show, when he reappears playing the part of Don Juan, his entire face and body are covered with a cloak and hood. In the film, he performs the number in a red toreador outfit and black eye mask which in turn alerts Christine and the audience to the fact that it is the Phantom singing to her immediately. In the show, where Christine comes to the moment of realization varies depending upon the performer. In some performances, Christine realizes it when the Phantom places his hands in front of her face/eyes, a gesture he had previously did in "The Music of the Night". In other versions, Christine feels the Phantom's mask under his cloak upon touching his face, and reacts accordingly.

== In other works ==
For the 1989 film The Phantom of the Opera, an aria of Don Juan Triumphant was composed by Misha Segal. His original compositions received acclaim despite the film's poor reception, with one reviewer saying, "The super soundtrack and operatic opportunities fizzle when they're muted, as if director Dwight Little is afraid too much great music will dull the senses of the primary audiences Englund will bring to the box office." Another reviewer, Malcolm L. Johnson, called his aria, "...a haunting little melody..." but theorized Segal wrote it, "...after listening to Andrew Lloyd Webber's music." While Johnson just theorized Segal was influenced by Webber, Jeff Simon of News Critic accused him of knocking off the Broadway composer, he said, "Misha Segal's music rips off Lloyd Webber's dotted rhythms, but to no avail."

In Susan Kay's 1990 novel Phantom, it is mentioned that it was a piece solely based on passion and anger, as Erik's (the Phantom) childhood gypsy captor sardonically nicknamed him "Don Juan". When Christine hears Erik playing it, he remarks, "I raped her with my music."

In Nicholas Meyer's 1993 novel The Canary Trainer, Sherlock Holmes attempts to recover the Phantom's copy of Don Juan Triumphant from beneath the Paris Opera, but is unable to locate it. He states that based on the portions he heard, it was a masterpiece, but admits that he may have got (uncharacteristically) caught up in the emotion of the moment, and that it may not have been so great after all.

In Frederick Forsyth's 1999 novel The Phantom of Manhattan, which is a sequel to the musical, it is stated that Don Juan Triumphant was never performed again after its debut performance in the musical. During the novel, Erik composes a second play for Christine to perform, The Angel of Shiloh, about a love triangle between a Virginian plantation-owner's daughter, a deformed Connecticut officer, and a Virginian cavalryman set during the Battle of Shiloh during the American Civil War.
