= The Persian =

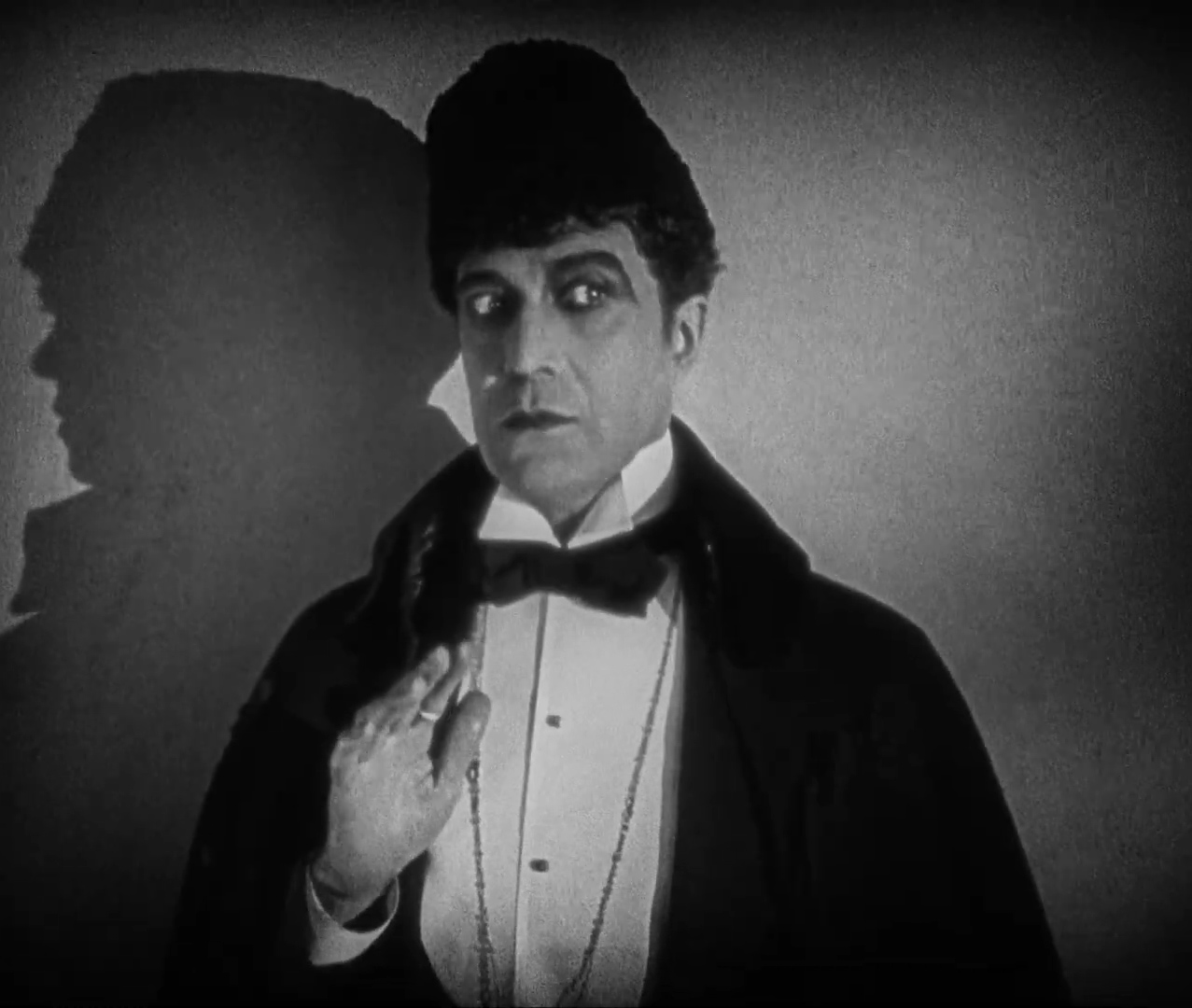
- Arthur Edmund Carewe as Ledoux (The Persian), in Universal's 1925 silent film version of The Phantom of the Opera
- First appearance: The Phantom of the Opera (1909)
- Created by: Gaston Leroux

In-universe information
- Gender: Male
- Title: Daroga
- Nationality: Persian

The Persian is a major character from the 1910 Gaston Leroux novel The Phantom of the Opera. In the book, he is the one who tells most of the background of Erik's history. Erik refers to him as the "daroga" (داروغه, Persian for "police-chief") and his memoirs are featured in five chapters of the novel. He is also considered Erik's only friend.

According to his account of himself in the novel, the Persian once served as the chief of police (daroga) in the court of the Shah of Persia during the years that Erik was there. The Shah ordered him to execute Erik after Erik provided his services in construction for the Shah. Being kindhearted, he helped Erik escape from Persia instead, a trick that involved presenting a body washed up on the shore as Erik's. When news of the escape spread, the Shah correctly suspected The Persian of being involved, and punished him by stripping him of his property and sending him into exile. However, as a distant member of the royal family, The Persian continued to be paid a small pension.

The Persian later travels to Paris and takes up living in a small, middle-class flat in the rue de Rivoli, across the street from the Tuileries, and employs a servant named Darius. He becomes known as a fixture of the Opera, considered an eccentric foreigner who is allowed to wander backstage where he pleases. Research into Leroux's sources has revealed that Leroux based this description upon a real-life Persian who frequented the Paris Opera in the 19th century. This person was the son of Hajji Khalil Khan, a Persian Ambassador to India who was accidentally shot dead in Bombay in 1802 by bodyguards provided to him by the East India Company. As part of their apology the British government was paying his son, the Persian, a generous pension that had enabled him to live out his life in Paris.

He is described in the novel as having an "ebony skin, with eyes of jade", and he wears a short Astrakhan cap along with Western dress clothes of the narrative's historic setting. Leroux writes that he has "a noble and generous heart" and is an upright man concerned for the fate of others. The novel does not ever specify The Persian's name.

== Role in the novel ==
The Persian first appears during Christine and Raoul's flight from the rooftops and warns them to go a different way. He next makes himself known after Christine's disappearance when he suddenly appears to Raoul and warns him, "Erik's secrets concern no one but himself!" Raoul ignores this warning by telling the commissary the whole story, but the Persian intercepts him and tells him that it is Erik, not Raoul's brother Philippe, who has carried off Christine. He leads Raoul through the passages of the Opera House to Christine's dressing room, where they go through the revolving door hidden in Christine's mirror and travel down through the passages under the Opera. Raoul is very confused as to the purpose of the long pistol the Persian has given him, as he is only instructed to keep his hand as if he were ready to fire - and that it does not even matter whether he is holding the weapon. The Persian eventually reveals that holding a hand at eye level is a defense against the Punjab lasso. No matter how expert the thrower is, the lasso cannot be tightened around a neck with a hand blocking its path.

When they finally reach the back entrance to Erik's house, where Joseph Buquet was found hanged, they drop into what turns out to be Erik's torture-chamber. This chamber contains heat-reflecting mirrors that reach from floor to ceiling, with an iron tree in a corner, making its occupant feel like he or she is in an unending forest of trees made of iron. (Buquet had stumbled into this room and used a Punjab lasso hanging from a tree branch to commit suicide.)

The Persian finds a hidden exit that allows him and Raoul to drop into a still-lower room filled with gunpowder, which Erik will use to blow up the Opera House unless Christine agrees to marry him. She accepts this offer and water floods into the powder room, nearly drowning Raoul and the Persian.

The novel concludes 30 years after these events, with the Persian - now old and sick, and still attended by Darius - telling how he and Raoul were saved from the flood by Erik, who allowed all three captives to go free. He dies five months after giving this account.

== Adaptations ==
In the 1925 silent film The Phantom Of The Opera, his character was changed into an inspector for the secret police named "Ledoux" who had been investigating Erik for months. He still helps and accompanies Raoul to rescue Christine. Originally, the character was meant to be more like in the novel but his background was changed during the creation of the intertitles for the movie. He still appears to be of Persian descent in the final film, though.

In the 1986 Andrew Lloyd Webber musical, he does not appear, although aspects of his character are merged with Madame Giry's. For instance, Madame Giry shows Raoul where Erik lives, although she does not accompany him to Erik's lair. There is also a monkey doll and music box, dressed as a Persian, on auction at the opening scene of the musical.

== Apocrypha ==
In Susan Kay's 1990 novel Phantom, the Persian's name is given as Nadir Khan. Distantly related to the Shah, he is assigned the office of chief of police in Mazenderan, where the shah and his court spend the summers. He is a widower, his wife Rookheeya having died while giving birth to their son Reza. Out of love for the memory of Rookheeya, Nadir has never had any other wife and occasionally avails himself of servant women rather than get remarried. He is very fond of Reza, who bears a great resemblance to his mother and is dying of Tay–Sachs disease. Nadir has a great dislike of cats, and they seem to know it. Unfortunately, the shah owns a number of favorite cats and Nadir considers himself lucky to get off with imperial displeasure and a deep scratch on the ankle when he accidentally steps on a cat's tail. In an earlier adapted novel by Theadora Bruns, his name is Oded.

In the Caliber Comics graphic novel Adventure of the Opera Ghost by Steven Philip Jones and Aldin Baroza, a former daroga named Nadir Khan assists Sherlock Holmes, Dr. John H. Watson, the Comte de Chagny, and Raoul in their attempts to hunt down Erik in the Paris Opera House.

In Nicholas Meyer's 1993 novel The Canary Trainer, the role of the Persian is largely taken by an incognito Sherlock Holmes.

Kim Newman's short stories "Angels of Music" and "The Mark of Kane" from the Tales of the Shadowmen anthology series are a parody of Charlie's Angels. In the stories, Erik is the equivalent of Charlie Townsend, and the Persian takes the role of Bosley.
