= The Phantom of the Opera (1989 film) =

1989 film by Dwight H. Little

- Theatrical release poster
- Directed by: Dwight H. Little
- Screenplay by: Gerry O'Hara; Duke Sandefur
- Based on: The Phantom of the Opera by Gaston Leroux
- Produced by: Menahem Golan; Harry Alan Towers
- Starring: Robert Englund; Jill Schoelen; Alex Hyde-White; Bill Nighy; Terence Harvey; Stephanie Lawrence
- Cinematography: Peter Lyons Collister; Elemér Ragályi
- Edited by: Charles Bornstein
- Music by: Misha Segal
- Production companies: Breton Film Productions; Dee Gee Entertainment
- Distributed by: 21st Century Film Corporation
- Release date: November 3, 1989
- Running time: 93 minutes
- Countries: United States; United Kingdom
- Language: English
- Budget: $6 million
- Box office: $4 million

The Phantom of the Opera is a 1989 horror film directed by Dwight H. Little, and starring Robert Englund, Jill Schoelen, Alex Hyde-White, Bill Nighy, Stephanie Lawrence, and Molly Shannon. Based on Gaston Leroux's 1910 novel of the same name, the film is a modernized, gorier adaptation. It was not well received by critics and performed poorly at the box office.

== Plot ==
Christine Day, a young opera singer in modern-day Manhattan, is searching for a unique piece to sing at her next audition. Her friend and manager Meg discovers an old opera piece called Don Juan Triumphant, written by a composer named Erik Destler. Curious, Christine and Meg do a little research on Destler and discover he may have been responsible for many murders and the disappearance of a young female opera singer he was said to have been obsessed with. While Christine is alone, she sings from the tattered parchment, and blood seeps from the notes and covers her hands. Shocked, she discovers this to be an illusion when Meg returns. Christine auditions with the piece, and during her performance, an accident with a falling sandbag renders her unconscious and shatters a mirror.

She awakens in London in 1885, wearing opera clothing. A different version of Meg is also there. Christine turns out to be the understudy to the diva La Carlotta, who is both jealous and resentful of Christine's skill. During this whole time, Erik Destler attacks the scene-shifter Joseph with a blade high above the rafters for almost killing Christine with the falling sandbag, and blaming the accident on him.

Alone in her dressing room, Christine hears the voice of Erik Destler, revealing he is her teacher and an angel sent by her deceased father. Destler encourages her to practice Carlotta's part of Marguerite in Faust, saying that only she can sing the part. Christine complies. That evening, Carlotta discovers Joseph's skinned (but barely alive) body in her dressing closet. The event causes her to scream and lose her voice. Christine is cast in the role of Marguerite, which causes panic to the opera house owner Martin Barton, who favors Carlotta and the prestige she brings to his opera house.

During the scene where Dr. Faust signs his soul to the Devil, Destler reminisces about a time, decades ago, when he unknowingly sold his own soul to the Devil in exchange for people loving him for his music. The Devil granted his wish but disfigured Destler's face, telling him that only his music will be what people love him for. Christine gives a stellar performance, receiving a standing ovation, and celebrates that night with her fiancé Richard Dutton. She tells him of her mysterious "teacher" to whom she accredits her success. A mildly jealous Richard asks to meet this teacher, but Christine insists her teacher is only a figment of her imagination. Meanwhile, Destler seduces a prostitute and pays her gold to call herself "Christine" for the night.

Shockingly, the next morning in the papers, Christine is given a bad review by the famous opera critic E.A. Harrison, secretly done as a favor to Barton. Destler tracks Harrison down and brutally murders him in a Turkish spa after Harrison refuses to recant his review. Christine tearfully goes to the graveyard and prays at her father's grave. Destler appears as a shadowy violinist and offers her a chance at musical immortality if she will only go to him. Christine goes away with the Phantom in his stagecoach. Deep in the sewers below London's opera house, Destler reveals himself as the composer of Don Juan Triumphant, which causes a spark of recollection within Christine. She sings the same lyrics from the beginning of the film. Destler places his ring upon her finger and warns her never to see another man again. Christine fearfully promises she will not; Destler kisses her hand, declaring her to be his bride.

Richard goes to Inspector Hawkins, who reveals that the Phantom is not only the legendary Erik Destler, but has lived for decades, uses the opera house's catacombs as a hideout, and skins his murdered victims for their facial skin to cover his own hideous visage. Richard has heard that the only way to kill the Phantom is to destroy his music.

After hearing of Harrison's murder, Christine meets Richard at a masquerade ball and begs him to take her away. She fears the Phantom and really loves Richard. Erik, disguised as Red Death, witnesses this exchange and becomes enraged. He decapitates Carlotta, causing mayhem, and kidnaps Christine. Hawkins, Richard, and the rat catcher, whom Destler has been bribing, go quickly in pursuit. Back in the Phantom's lair, an enraged Destler attempts to rape Christine but hears the men approaching. He tells Christine she can never leave and locks her in the lair. Two policemen become lost in the sewers and are killed by Destler, including the rat catcher for betraying him.

He returns to Christine, who asks him if he is going to kill her too. Destler replies, "This is either a wedding march or a funeral mass. You decide which." Richard and Inspector Hawkins burst in. After a brutal fight with the Phantom, Richard is stabbed, set aflame, and killed instantly. Christine sets the lair on fire by pushing over candelabras and attempts to kill Destler, but he grabs her hand and tries to lead her away with him. However, a wounded Hawkins manages to shoot Destler. Christine pushes another candle holder through a mirror, which sends her back to her own time. As she vanishes, she hears Destler's echoing voice screaming her name.

Christine awakens back to the present-day in Manhattan and meets the opera's producer, Mr. Foster, who comforts her and offers her the leading part. They have drinks at his apartment, and Foster goes upstairs to change and finds a blemish on his face, revealing that Foster is really Destler from long ago. He prepares to change his facial skin with synthetic ones he keeps in a special lab. Meanwhile, downstairs, Christine discovers a copy of the Don Juan Triumphant music score. Foster/Destler enters, reveals his true identity to her, and lovingly kisses her lips. Christine pretends to accept him, then rips off his mask, stabs him, and escapes, taking his music. She tears it apart and lets it drop into a drain, whilst Foster/Destler is heard screaming.

Christine passes by a street violin player on her way home, whom she gives some money to. The violinist starts playing the theme from Don Juan Triumphant. Christine looks back and reflects on the music for a while. Then, very resolutely, she turns around and continues on her way, wondering if Destler is really gone for good.

== Cast ==
- Robert Englund as Erik Destler, The Phantom of the Opera/Mr. Foster
- Jill Schoelen as Christine Day
  - Nancy Fontana as the singing voice of Christine
- Alex Hyde-White as Richard Dutton
- Bill Nighy as Martin Barton
- Stephanie Lawrence as La Carlotta
- Molly Shannon as Meg (New York)
- Emma Rawson as Meg (London)
- Terence Harvey as Inspector Hawkins
- Nathan Lewis as Davies
- Peter Clapham as Harrison
- Yehuda Efroni as The Rat Catcher
- Terence Beesley as Joseph Buquet
- Mark Ryan as Mott
- John Ghavan as the Devil
  - W. Morgan Sheppard as the Devil (voice)

== Production ==
=== Development ===
The script was originally written by Gerry O'Hara for Cannon films, and was set to be directed by John Hough. O'Hara's version of the screenplay did not feature any present-day segments, and was set entirely in 1881 England. However, after Cannon filed for bankruptcy, the film was passed on to the 21st Century Film Corporation. 21st Century planned to follow up the film with a sequel called The Phantom of the Opera 2: Terror in Manhattan, in which the Phantom lives in the sewers of present-day Manhattan. Television writer Duke Sandefur was hired to add bookend segments set in present-day Manhattan to O'Hara's script, so that the film would tie into its proposed sequel. Ultimately, the sequel was not made, but the bookend segments remain in the film.

=== Casting ===
Robert Englund was the first actor announced to be attached to the film. "It started out as a promise I made to my agent that, outside of Freddy, I owed him one other horror project," Englund revealed in an interview with Fangoria. "Initially, the agreement was that I would do an Anthony Perkins type of film, but then I was approached by producers Menahem Golan and Harry Alan Towers about doing Phantom. I liked the idea that I would be in the company of great actors like Herbert Lom, Claude Rains, Max Schell and Lon Chaney, who all played the Phantom, and I liked the idea that the film - based on what I read in the first draft of Duke Sandefur's script - had a heavy Hammer influence. I also liked a lot of Dwight Little's work on Halloween 4, so when I learned he was going to direct, that sort of cinched it."

It was revealed Stephanie Lawrence would be playing the role of Carlotta in March 1989. "It is a fabulous script and very similar to the original film. I am absolutely looking forward to it," said Lawrence.

=== Filming ===
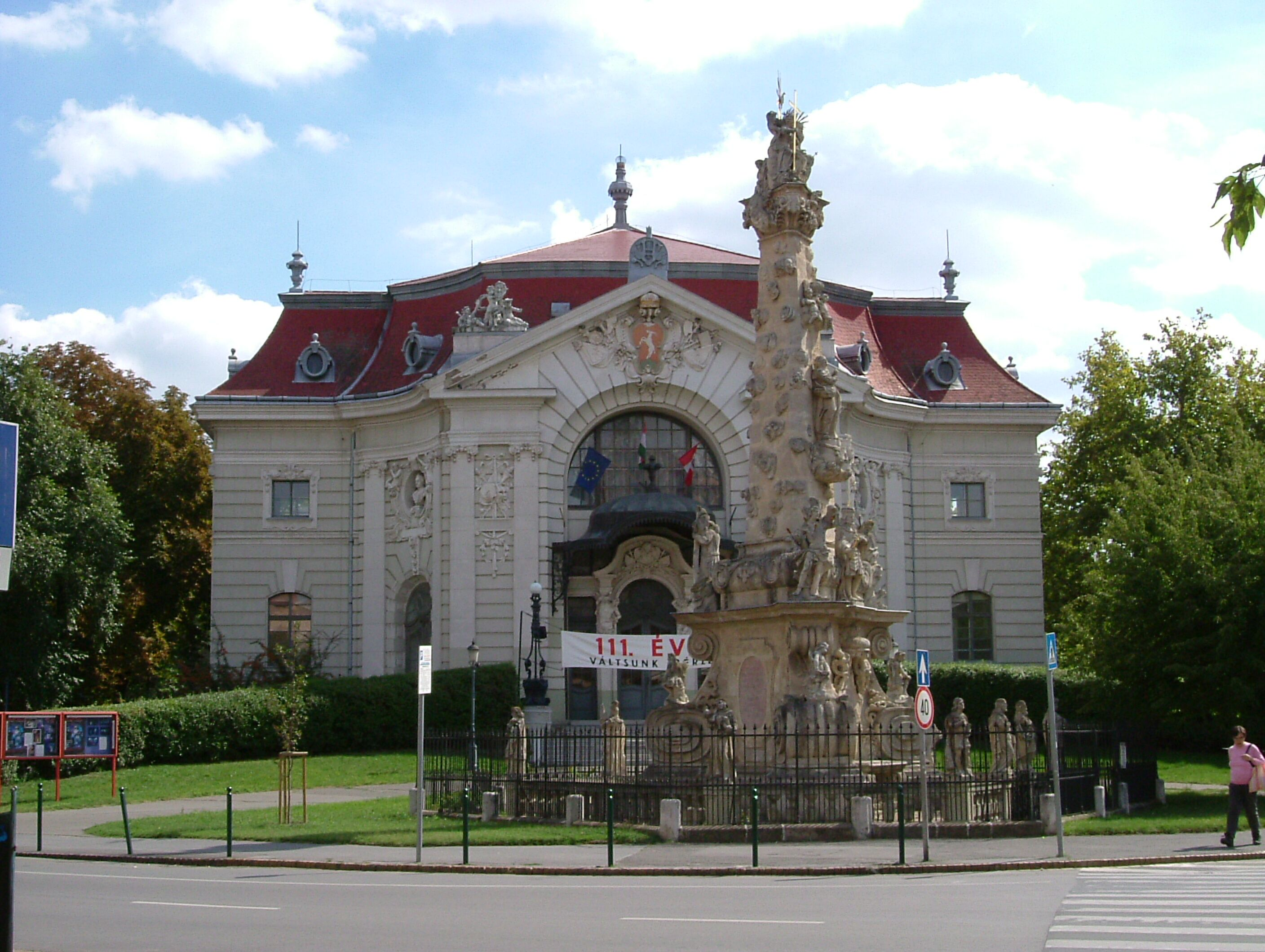
The Katona József Theatre used as the Opera House

The film was scheduled to start filming in early January 1989, but due to production delays was unable to start until March.

On March 10, Robert Englund passed through Heathrow Airport, stopping off temporarily before continuing to Hungary. "I was really nervous about this role," divulged Enlgund in an Fangoria interview. "The Phantom in this movie has a Ripper-like, skulking quality that's a lot different from what I do as Freddy. I felt I needed some preparation. Coincidentally, I had to stop in England to do some publicity for Nightmare 4 on the way to Hungary. I was able to use the time to work on my accent - the movie takes place partly in 1880s England - and to hang out and develop the idea of skulking around. [...] When I got to England, I was jetlagged in the worst way, so I was getting up at 4:00 AM and walking along the Thames and other places," Englund revealed. "The sound of my shoes hitting those streets with nobody else around put me in the proper Phantom state of mind."

The production filmed in Kecskemét, Hungary, and used the Kecskemét Katona József National Theatre for the Opera House interiors and exteriors. To save costs, the film utilized sets already built for Menahem Golan's Mack the Knife.

"The worst scene for me was when I had to sit in the bath for a whole day," said Stephanie Lawrence. "The crew who got it ready made it so hot that it was like sitting on top of a kettle! It was very uncomfortable... give me a cold bath anytime!"

As soon as production wrapped filming in May 1989, Englund had to rush back to the United States to work on A Nightmare on Elm Street 5: The Dream Child.

During the promotional period for the film, Englund was asked a number of times about if the movie had any relation to the Andrew Lloyd Webber musical, his answers ranged from diplomatic to antagonistic. "Not the musical. I have the worst monotone in the world," Robert England diplomatically clarified while discussing the project. "This is from the original novel." "There's no wimpy Michael Crawford stuff in our version," said Englund at another point. "We deliver the goods. We stab 'em, rape 'em, dice 'em, and slice 'em."

== Soundtrack ==
The soundtrack to Phantom of the Opera was composed and conducted by Misha Segal, and performed by the Budapest Symphony Orchestra. The soundtrack was released by Restless Records in 1989, and re-released in 1993.

Of particular interest to fans of the original novel is Segal's rendition of the Phantom's opera composition 'Don Juan Triumphant', with the Phantom on the organ and Christine singing. His original compositions received acclaim despite the films poor reception, with one reviewer saying, "The super soundtrack and operatic opportunities fizzle when they're muted, as if director Dwight Little is afraid too much great music will dull the senses of the primary audiences Englund will bring to the box office."

The song "Good Looking" by Segal is not part of the soundtrack despite appearing in the film.

All music is composed by and performed by Misha Segal, except where noted.

Phantom of the Opera (Original Motion Picture Soundtrack) track listing
No.	Title	Lyrics	Performer(s)	Length
1.	"Phantom of the Opera - Main Title Theme"			3:25
2.	"Hellbound"			1:53
3.	"Don Juan Triumphant / Travel Through Time"	Harriet Schock	Nancy Fontana	1:54
4.	"Christine's Decision"			1:32
5.	"Young Phantom's Piano Etude"			1:13
6.	"Carlotta's Head"			1:07
7.	"Pact With The Devil"			1:03
8.	"Maddie"			2:18
9.	"Phantom On Fire"			2:05
10.	"The Jewel Song (From Faust)"	Charles Gounod	Nancy Fontana	4:05
11.	"The Phantom's Face"			2:18
12.	"Mott Stalks The Phantom"			1:19
13.	"Richard Gets Killed"			1:15
14.	"Graveyard Violin"			1:48
15.	"What's In The Closet"			0:45
16.	"The Wedding"			0:57
17.	"The Cursed Manuscript"			1:12
18.	"Ride To The Cemetery"			1:37
19.	"Intruders"			1:51
20.	"Phantom of the Opera - End Title Theme"			3:05
Total length:				36:42

== Release ==
The Phantom of the Opera opened theatrically on November 3, 1989, in 1,468 venues in the United States.

=== Home media ===
The film was released on VHS in 1990 by RCA/Columbia Pictures Home Video and on DVD in 2004 by MGM Home Entertainment. Scream Factory (a subsidiary of Shout! Factory) released the film on February 17, 2015, for the first time on Blu-ray in the United States. The film was released alongside the documentary film, Behind the Mask: The Making of "The Phantom of the Opera". The documentary film featured interviews with Englund, Schoelen, Nighy, Hyde-White, Shannon, and director Little.

== Reception ==
=== Box office ===
The Phantom of the Opera ranked sixth at the domestic box office, with $2,050,000 in its first weekend. The film closed three weeks later, having grossed $3,953,745.

=== Critical response ===
The film received mixed to negative reviews from critics. Caryn James of The New York Times wrote, "This 'Phantom' is not lively enough to be kitschy, or original enough in its badness to be funny." Variety called the film "competent but flatly directed," adding that "Englund is his usual broad self. Yet gorehounds expecting a 'Freddy of the Opera' are bound to be disappointed, for the stabbings, stranglings and decapitations he executes lack suspense, surprise or innovation." Dave Kehr of the Chicago Tribune called it "a stern, lugubrious affair, almost completely devoid of the humor and invention that have made the 'Nightmare' films consistently watchable." Kim Newman of The Monthly Film Bulletin wrote that it "occasionally has a pleasant Hammer Films/Gothic feel," but that "Englund is buried under thick make-up even when trying to pass for normal and is unable to do much with the role."

Tim Carman of The Houston Post gave the film three out of four stars, and wrote the movie was, "...a horror flick that is both graphically frightening and intellectually fascinating."

On the review aggregator website Rotten Tomatoes, 33% of 12 critics' reviews are positive.

== Cancelled sequel ==
The Phantom of the Opera 2: Terror In Manhattan, also referred to as Terror of Manhattan,. and the Phantom of Manhattan, was the unproduced sequel to the 1989 The Phantom of the Opera.

Robert Englund was under contract to appear in a sequel, but it was canceled after the film's poor reception, and has been the subject of numerous rumors. Fangoria stated in 1991 that the script was re-written into what became 1992's film Dance Macabre, also starring Englund. Englund confirmed in a 2004 interview that a script had been written, and while he personally felt it was superior to the first film, it had never been filmed in any capacity, debunking the Dance Macabre theory.

"We were supposed to do a follow-up called Phantom of Manhattan which had a wonderful script," Englund revealed in 1992, "but we were never able to get the use of the Toronto subway system which was essential for the story."

In a 2023 interview, Englund went into detail about the plot of the unproduced film, and the Phantom, "He has this [gang] of Lost Boys who are these punk rock runaway homeless kids that he feeds and takes care of, and he lives in an old robber baron's train car. Then, from the subway, the Phantom hears a busker performer for commuters and it's a blind girl who becomes his muse. Her voice is the voice that will bring his music back alive." The Phantom would then locate the girl, becoming her protector, saving her and her violinist father from a skinhead attack. Her condition means that she can't see his disfigured face, and accepts him based on his actions, not his appearance. "He's able to talk to her and give her his music," says Englund, picking up the narrative. "She takes his song to audition for the New York City Opera. She gets [the part] and they put their money together to give her an eye operation that cures her blindness." Unfortunately, regaining her sight means she'll no longer be seeing the Phantom. "He goes to see her debut at the opera, and as he leaves, he covers himself up," Englund says, setting the stage for the tragic finale. "The last shot is him walking down 5th Avenue. He lifts a manhole cover up with his cane and then goes underneath and then pulls the cover back as the snow is coming down. And that's the end! He's back in the bowels of Manhattan. It's this really arch romantic thing."

In 2012, Englund was asked at a memorabilia sale about the possibility of a sequel happening in the near future; Englund informed everybody in attendance that although it would be overwhelming to see a sequel, the chances of it happening at this stage are "highly unlikely."

== Legacy ==
In April 2020 and July 2020, actors Alex Hyde-White, Jill Schoelen and Robert Englund reunited to celebrate the film's 30-year anniversary by participating in two separate interviews on Tammy Tuckey's Rattling the Stars podcast. Hyde-White and Schoelen featured in both interviews while Englund joined them for the second one.
