= The Phantom of the Opera (1925 film) =

American silent horror film

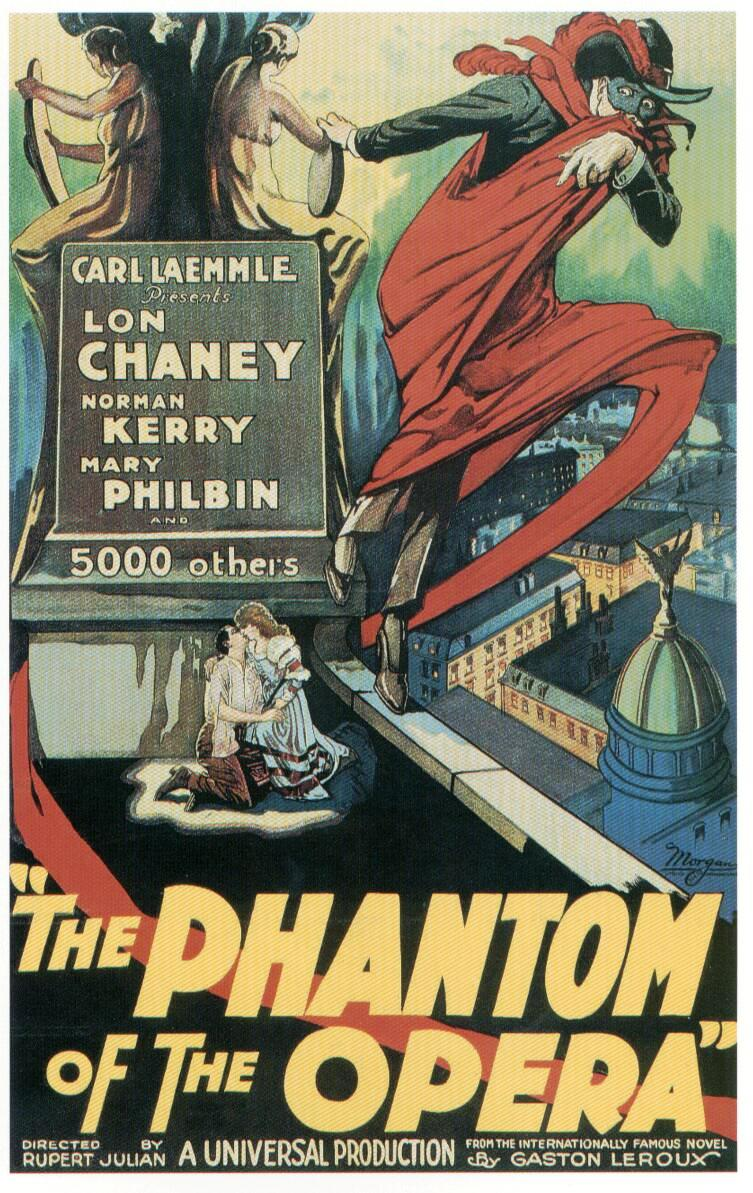
- Theatrical release poster
- Directed by: Rupert Julian; Uncredited: Lon Chaney; Ernst Laemmle; Edward Sedgwick
- Screenplay by: Uncredited: Walter Anthony; Elliott J. Clawson; Bernard McConville; Frank M. McCormack; Tom Reed; Raymond L. Schrock; Jasper Spearing; Richard Wallace
- Based on: The Phantom of the Opera; 1910 novel by Gaston Leroux
- Produced by: Carl Laemmle
- Starring: Lon Chaney; Norman Kerry; Mary Philbin; Arthur Edmund Carewe; Gibson Gowland; Snitz Edwards; Bernard Seigel
- Cinematography: Charles Van Enger; Uncredited additional photography: Milton Bridenbecker; Virgil Miller
- Edited by: Edward Curtiss; Maurice Pivar; Gilmore Walker; Lois Weber
- Music by: Gustav Hinrichs
- Production company: Universal Pictures
- Distributed by: Universal Pictures
- Release dates: September 6, 1925 (New York, premiere); November 15, 1925 (USA); December 15, 1929 (Sound re-release)
- Running time: 107 minutes (original cut); 94 minutes (1929 sound re-release); 92 minutes (Eastman House print, 20 fps); 78 minutes (Eastman House print, 24 fps)
- Country: United States
- Language: Silent (English intertitles)
- Budget: $632,357.
- Box office: $2 million; $1 million (1929 sound re-release)

The Phantom of the Opera is a 1925 American silent gothic horror film adaptation of Gaston Leroux's 1910 novel of the same name directed by Rupert Julian and starring Lon Chaney in the title role of the deformed Phantom who haunts the Paris Opera House, causing murder and mayhem in an attempt to make the woman he loves a star. The film remains most famous for Chaney's ghastly, self-devised make-up, which was kept a studio secret until the film's premiere. The picture also features Mary Philbin, Norman Kerry, Arthur Edmund Carewe, Gibson Gowland, John St. Polis and Snitz Edwards. The last surviving cast member was Carla Laemmle (1909–2014), niece of producer Carl Laemmle, who played a small role as a "prima ballerina" in the film when she was about 15 years old. The first cut of the film was previewed in Los Angeles on January 26, 1925. The film was released on September 6, 1925, premiering at the Astor Theatre in New York. In 1953, the film entered the public domain in the United States because the film's distributor Universal Pictures did not renew its copyright registration in the 28th year after publication.

== Plot ==
The following synopsis is based on the general release version of 1925, which has additional scenes and sequences in different order than the existing reissue print.

In the 1890s, at the Paris Opera House, Comte Philippe de Chagny and his brother, the Vicomte Raoul de Chagny attend a production of Faust, where the latter's sweetheart, Christine Daaé, may sing. Raoul wishes for Christine to resign and marry him, but she prioritizes her career over their relationship.

Meanwhile, the former management has sold the Opera House. While leaving, they tell the new managers about the Opera Ghost, a phantom who is "the occupant of box No. 5".

Mme. Carlotta, the prima donna, receives a letter from "The Phantom," demanding that Christine replace her the following night, threatening dire consequences if this does not happen. In Christine's dressing room, a voice tells her she must take Carlotta's place and think only of her career and her master.

The following day, Christine reveals to Raoul that she has been tutored by a mysterious voice, the "Spirit of Music," and it is now impossible to stop her career. Raoul says someone is probably playing a joke on her, and she storms off in anger.

The Phantom of the Opera, in black and white (24 fps)

The Phantom of the Opera, with tinting (20 fps)

That evening, Christine substitutes for Carlotta. During the performance, the managers are startled to see, seated in Box 5, a figure who later disappears. Simon Buquet then finds the body of his brother, stagehand Joseph Buquet, hanging by a noose and vows vengeance. Once again, a note from the Phantom demands Carlotta say she is ill and let Christine replace her. The managers get a similar note, reiterating that if Christine does not sing, they will present Faust in a cursed house.

The following evening, a defiant Carlotta sings. During the performance, the Phantom drops the chandelier hanging from the ceiling onto the audience, killing people. Christine enters a secret door behind the mirror in her dressing room, descending into the lower depths of the Opera. She meets the Phantom, who introduces himself as Erik and declares his love. Christine faints and he carries her to an underground suite fabricated for her comfort. The next day, she finds a note from Erik telling her that she must never look behind his mask. As he is preoccupied playing his organ, Christine playfully tears off his mask, revealing his deformed face. Enraged, the Phantom declares she is now his prisoner. She begs him to let her sing, and he relents, allowing her to visit the surface one last time if she promises not to see Raoul again.

Released, Christine meets with Raoul at the annual masked ball, where the Phantom appears disguised as the "Red-Death." On the roof of the Opera House, Christine tells Raoul about her experiences. Unbeknownst to them, the Phantom is listening nearby. Raoul swears to whisk Christine away to London following her next performance. As they leave the roof, a man with a fez approaches them. Aware that the Phantom awaits downstairs, he leads Christine and Raoul to another exit.

The next night, during her performance, Christine is kidnapped. Raoul rushes to her dressing room and meets the man in the fez again. He is actually Inspector Ledoux, a secret policeman who has been tracking Erik since he escaped as a prisoner from Devil's Island. After finding the secret door in Christine's room, the two men enter the Phantom's lair. They end up in a torture chamber of his design. Philippe also finds his way into the catacombs, looking for his brother, but is eventually drowned by Erik.

The Phantom subjects Raoul and Ledoux to intense heat. He then locks them in with barrels of gunpowder and causes the room to flood. Christine begs Erik to save Raoul, promising him anything in return, even becoming his wife. This causes the Phantom to save Raoul and Ledoux.

A mob led by Simon Buquet infiltrates Erik's lair. As they approach, the Phantom attempts to flee with Christine. Raoul saves Christine while Erik, in one last act of twisted showmanship, frightens the crowd by pretending to hold some kind of lethal weapon in his clenched fist, only to reveal an empty palm before he is swarmed and killed by the mob and thrown into the Seine. Raoul and Christine later go on their honeymoon in Viroflay.

== Cast ==
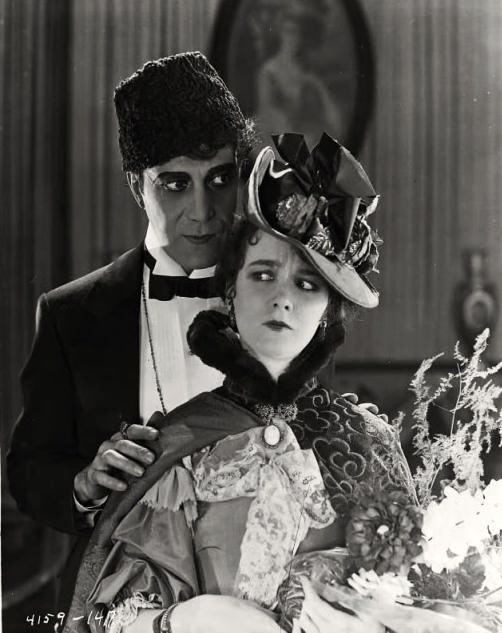
Arthur Edmund Carewe and Mary Philbin

- Lon Chaney as The Phantom
- Mary Philbin as Christine Daaé
- Norman Kerry as Vicomte Raoul de Chagny
- Arthur Edmund Carewe as Ledoux
- Gibson Gowland as Simon Buquet
- John St. Polis (credited as John Sainpolis) as Comte Philippe de Chagny
  - Edwin Martindel played Comte Philippe in the reshoot segments of the 1929 partial talkie reissue
- Snitz Edwards as Florine Papillon
- Virginia Pearson as Carlotta
  - Pearson played Carlotta's mother in the reshoot segments of the 1929 partial talkie reissue
  - Mary Fabian played a talking Carlotta in the reshoot segments of the 1929 partial talkie reissue

Uncredited:

- Bernard Siegel as Joseph Buquet
- Edward Martindel as Comte Phillipe de Chagny
  - for the reshoot segments of the 1929 partial talkie reissue
- Joseph Belmont as a stage manager
- Alexander Bevani as Méphistophélès
- Edward Cecil as Faust
- Ruth Clifford as Ballerina
- Roy Coulson as The Jester
- George Davis as The Guard outside Christine's door
- Madame Fiorenza as Box Attendant
- Cesare Gravina as a retiring manager
- Bruce Covington as Monsieur Moncharmin
- William Humphrey as Monsieur Debienne
- George B Williams as Monsieur Ricard
- Carla Laemmle as Prima Ballerina
- Grace Marvin as Martha
- John Miljan as Valéntin
- Rolfe Sedan as an undetermined role
- William Tracy as The Ratcatcher, the messenger from the shadows
- Anton Vaverka as Prompter
- Julius Harris as Gaffer

Deleted scenes:

- Chester Conklin as Orderly
- Olive Ann Alcorn as La Sorelli
- Ward Crane as Count Ruboff
- Edith Yorke as Mama Valerius
- Vola Vale as Christine's Maid

== Preproduction ==
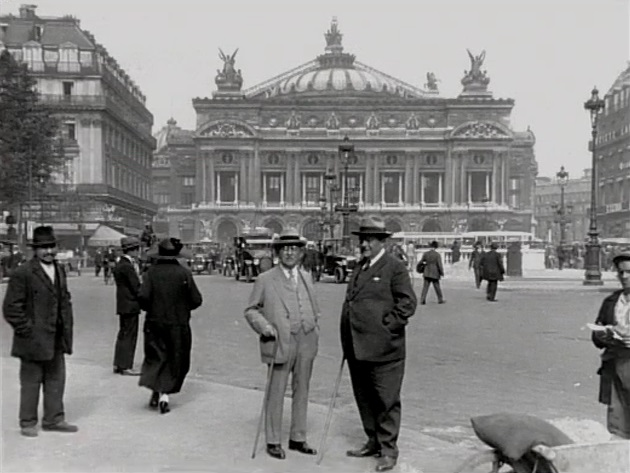
Carl Laemmle and Gaston Leroux at the Paris Opera.

In 1922, Carl Laemmle, the president of Universal Pictures, took a vacation to Paris. During his vacation, Laemmle met the author Gaston Leroux, who was working in the French film industry. Laemmle mentioned to Leroux that he admired the Paris Opera House. Leroux gave Laemmle a copy of his 1910 novel The Phantom of the Opera, which Laemmle read in one night and bought as a vehicle for actor Lon Chaney. Production was scheduled for late 1924 at Universal Studios.

The filmmakers were unfamiliar with the layout of the Paris Opera House and consulted Ben Carré, a French art director who had worked at the opera and was familiar with Leroux's novel. He said that Leroux's depiction of the opera cellars was based more on imagination than fact. Carré created 24 detailed charcoal sketches of the back and below-stage areas of the opera, which the filmmakers replicated. Carré was in Europe when shooting began and had no further involvement with the project. It was not until he was shown a print of the film in the 1970s that he realized that his designs had been incorporated.

The screenplay was written by Elliot J. Clawson, who had worked as director Rupert Julian's scenario writer since 1916. Clawson's first script was a close adaptation of Leroux's book and included scenes from the novel that would not appear in the released film, such as that in which the Phantom summons Christine to her father's grave in Brittany, where he poses in the cemetery as the "Angel of Music" and plays "The Resurrection of Lazarus" on his violin at midnight. The scene was filmed by Julian but excised after he left the project.

Inspired by the novel, Clawson added a lengthy flashback to Persia, where Erik (the Phantom) served as a conjurer and executioner in the court of a depraved sultana, using his Punjab lasso to strangle prisoners. Falling from her favor, Erik was condemned to be eaten alive by ants. He was rescued by the sultana's chief of police, who became Inspector Ledoux in the final version of the film, but the ants had consumed most of his face. The flashback was eliminated during subsequent story conferences, possibly for budgetary reasons. Instead, a line of dialogue was inserted to explain that Erik had been the chief torturer and inquisitor during the Paris Commune, when the opera served as a prison, with no explanation of his damaged face.

The studio considered the novel's ending too subdued, but Clawson's third revised script retained the scene in which Christine kisses the Phantom compassionately. He is profoundly shaken and moans: "Even my own mother would never kiss me." A mob approaches led by Simon (the brother of a stagehand who was murdered earlier by the Phantom). Erik flees the Opera House with Christine. He takes control of a coach, which overturns because of his reckless driving, and he escapes the mob by scaling a bridge with the aid of his strangler's lasso. Waiting for him at the top is Simon, who cuts the lasso. The Phantom suffers a deadly fall, and his dying words are: "All I wanted... was to have a wife like anybody else... and to take her out on Sundays."

The studio remained dissatisfied. In another revised ending, Erik and Christine flee the mob and take refuge in her house. Before entering, Erik cringes "as Satan before the cross". Inside her rooms, he is overcome and says that he is dying. He asks whether she will kiss him and proposes to give her a wedding ring so that Christine can give it to Raoul. The Persian, Simon and Raoul all burst into the house. Christine informs them that Erik is ill. He slumps dead to the floor, sending the wedding ring rolling across the carpet. Christine sobs and flees to the garden, and Raoul follows to console her.

== Production ==
Lon Chaney in The Phantom of the Opera

Production began in mid-October but encountered many problems. According to director of photography Charles Van Enger, Chaney and the rest of the cast and crew had strained relations with director Rupert Julian. Chaney and Julian eventually stopped communicating, so Van Enger served as a go-between. He would report Julian's directions to Chaney, who responded "Tell him to go to hell." As Van Enger remembered, "Lon did whatever he wanted."

Julian had become Universal's prestige director by completing the Merry-Go-Round (1923) close to budget after original director Eric von Stroheim had been fired. But on the set of The Phantom of the Opera, his lack of skill as a director was obvious to the crew. According to Van Enger, Julian had wanted the screen to turn black after the chandelier falls on the opera audience, but Van Enger ignored him and lit the set with a soft glow so that the aftermath of the fall would be visible.

The ending changed yet again during filming. The scripted chase scene through Paris was discarded in favor of an unscripted and more intimate finale. To save Raoul, Christine agrees to wed Erik and kisses his forehead. Erik is overcome by Christine's purity and his own ugliness. The mob enters his lair under the Opera House, only to find the Phantom slumped dead over his organ, where he had been playing his composition Don Juan Triumphant.

By mid-November 1924, the majority of Chaney's scenes had been filmed. Principal photography was completed just before the end of the year, with 350,000 feet of negative exposed. Editor Gilmore Walker assembled a rough cut of nearly four hours, but the studio demanded a length of no more than 12 reels.

A score was prepared by Joseph Carl Breil. No information about the score survives other than Universal's release: "Presented with augmented concert orchestra, playing the score composed by Briel, composer of music for The Birth of a Nation". The opening-day full-page advertisement in the Call-Bulletin read: "Universal Weekly claimed a 60-piece orchestra. Moving Picture World reported that 'The music from Faust supplied the music [for the picture].'"

The first cut of the film was previewed in Los Angeles on January 26, 1925. Audience reaction was extremely negative; many viewers complained of the film's excessive melodrama and suggested the insertion of comedic elements to relieve the tension. By March, the studio had decided to change the ending so that the Phantom would not be redeemed by a woman's kiss and would thus retain his evil nature through the end of the film. The redemptive ending is now lost, with only a few frames still surviving.

The New York premiere was canceled, and the film was rushed back into production, with a new script that focused more on Christine's love life. It is unknown whether Julian withdrew from the production or was fired, but his involvement with the film had ended. To salvage the film, Universal summoned the journeymen of its Hoot Gibson Western unit, who worked cheaply and quickly.

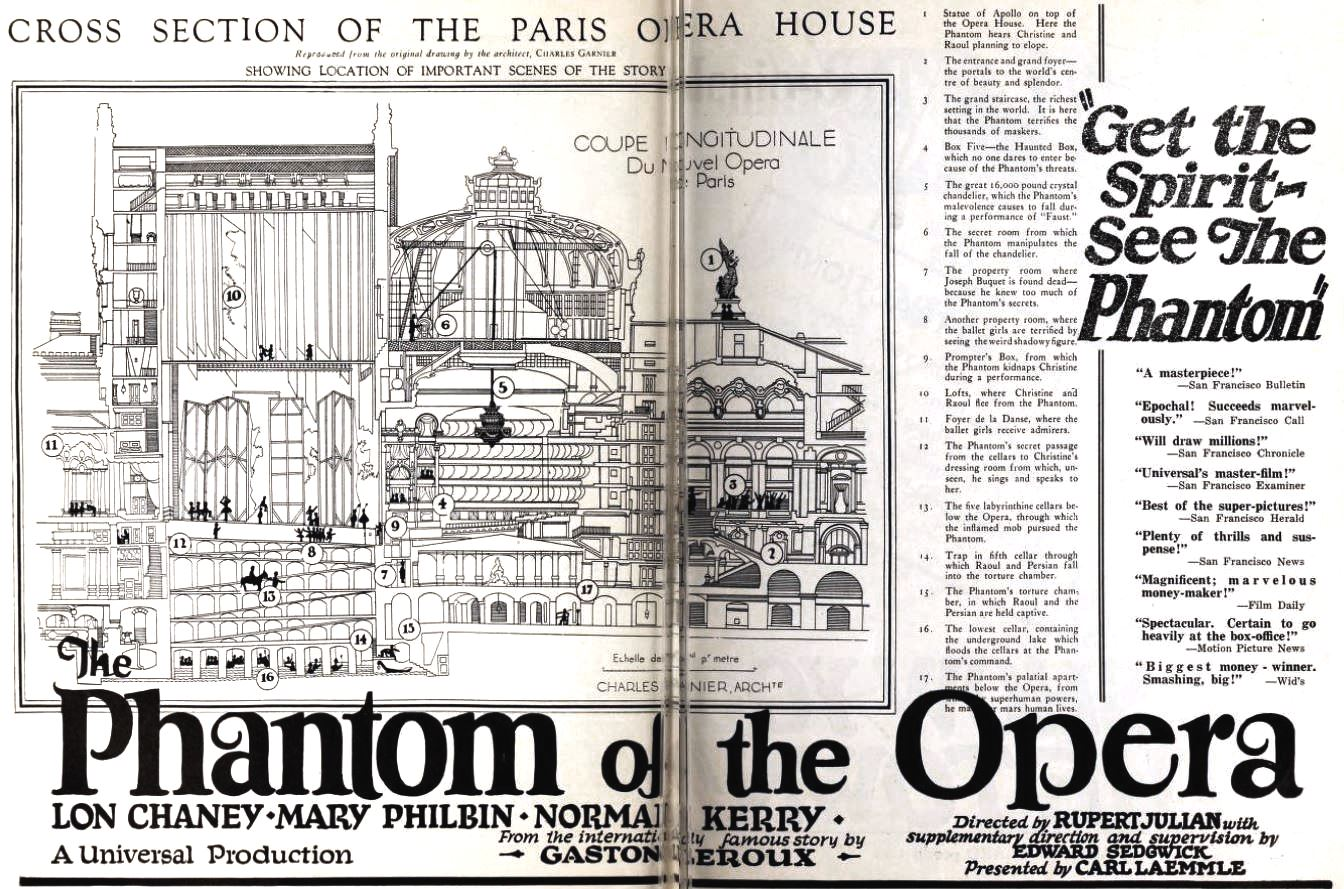
Diagram of the Opera House showing where events take place

Edward Sedgwick (later the director of Buster Keaton's 1928 film The Cameraman) was assigned by Laemmle to direct a reshoot of the bulk of the film. Raymond L. Schrock and original screenwriter Elliot Clawson wrote new scenes at Sedgewick's request. The film was then changed from the dramatic thriller that was originally produced into more of a romantic comedy with action elements. Most of the new scenes added subplots, with Chester Conklin and Vola Vale as comedic relief to the heroes, and Ward Crane as the Russian count Ruboff dueling with Raoul for Christine's affection. This version was previewed in San Francisco on April 26, 1925, but it received a strongly negative reaction, with the audience booing it off of the screen. One reviewer stated: "The story drags to the point of nauseam."

Universal holdovers Maurice Pivar and Lois Weber edited the production down to nine reels for the film's third and final version. Most of the Sedgwick material was removed, except the ending, with the Phantom hunted by a mob and thrown into the Seine River. Much of the cut Julian material was edited back into the film, although some important scenes and characters were not restored. This version, containing material from the original 1924 shooting and some from the Sedgwick reworking, was then scheduled for release. It debuted on September 6, 1925 at the Astor Theatre in New York City. The score was to be composed by Professor Gustav Hinrichs. However, Hinrichs' score was not prepared in time, so the premiere featured a score by Eugene Conte, composed mainly of "French airs" and the appropriate Faust cues. (Note: Hinrichs' score was available by the time when the film entered general release. (Reference: Music Institute of Chicago (2007) program note)) Universal spent lavishly on the premiere, even installing a full organ at the Astor for the event. (As it was a legitimate house, the Astor theater used an orchestra, not an organ, for its music.) Vaudeville stars Broderick and Felsen created a live prologue for the film's Broadway presentation at the B.S. Moss Colony Theater beginning on November 28, 1925.

=== Makeup ===
Following the success of The Hunchback of Notre Dame in 1923, Chaney was again granted the freedom to create his own makeup, a practice that became nearly as famous as the films in which he starred.

Chaney later commented: "In The Phantom of the Opera, people exclaimed at my weird make-up. I achieved the Death's Head of that role without wearing a mask. It was the use of paints in the right shades and the right places—not the obvious parts of the face—which gave the complete illusion of horror ... It's all a matter of combining paints and lights to form the right illusion."

Chaney used Andre Castaigne's color illustration of the novel as his model for the Phantom's appearance. He raised the contours of his cheekbones by stuffing wadding inside his cheeks. He used a skullcap to raise his forehead height several inches and accentuate the bald dome of the Phantom's skull. Pencil lines masked the join of the skullcap and exaggerated his brow lines. Chaney then glued his ears to his head and painted his eye sockets black, adding white highlights under his eyes for a skeletal effect. He created a skeletal smile by attaching prongs to a set of rotted false teeth and coating his lips with greasepaint. To transform his nose, Chaney applied putty to sharpen its angle and inserted two loops of wire into his nostrils. Guidewires hidden under the putty pulled his nostrils upward. According to cinematographer Charles Van Enger, Chaney suffered from his makeup, especially the wires, which sometimes made him "bleed like hell".

When audiences first saw the film, they were said to have screamed or fainted during the scene in which Christine pulls the concealing mask away, revealing his skull-like features.

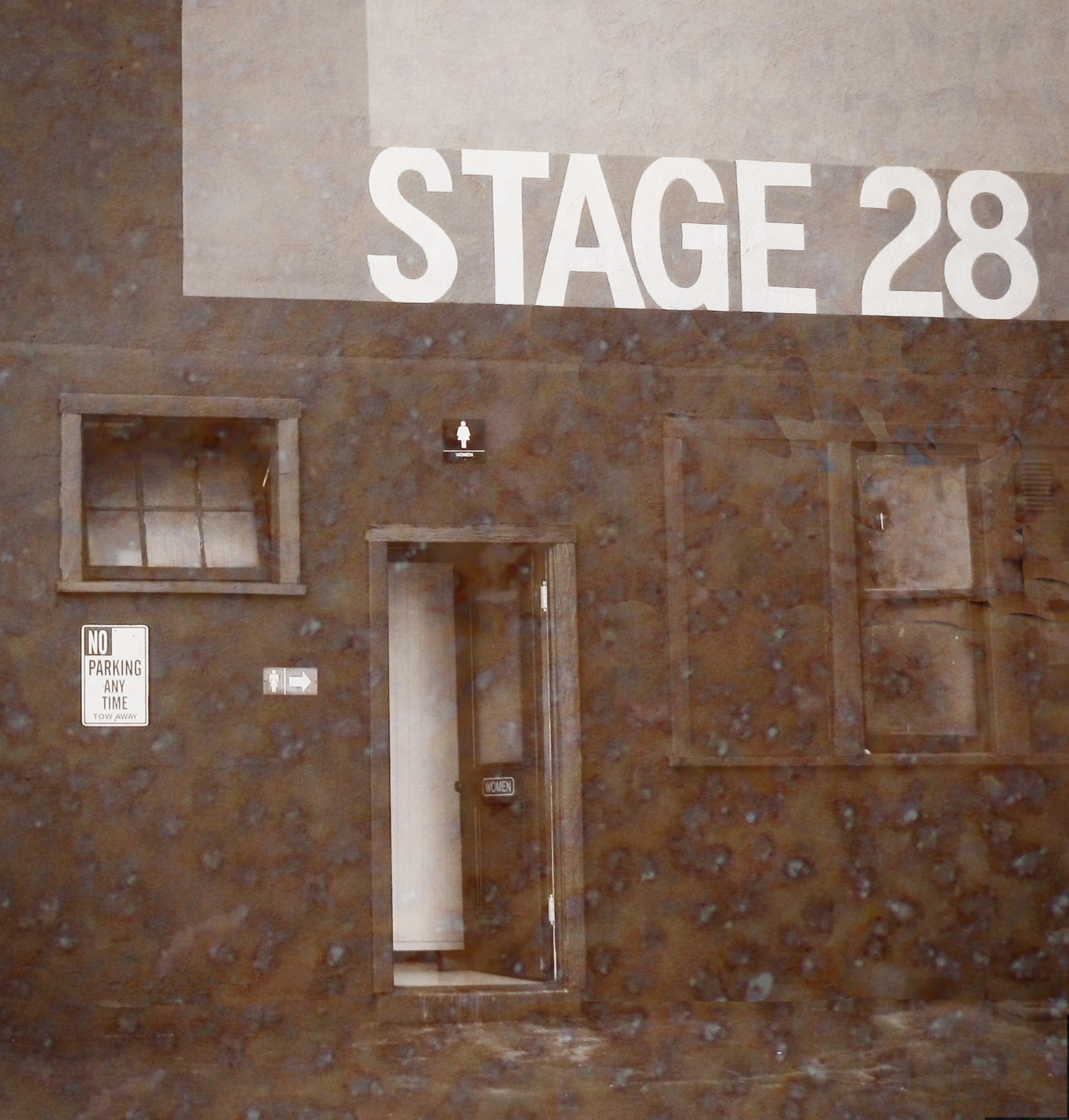
Stage 28, or the Phantom of the Opera stage

Chaney's appearance as the Phantom in the film has been the most accurate depiction of the title character based on the description provided in the novel, in which the Phantom is described with a skull-like face with a few wisps of black hair on top of his head. As in the novel, Chaney's Phantom has been deformed since birth, rather than having been disfigured by acid or fire, as in later adaptations of The Phantom of the Opera.

=== Soundstage 28 ===
Laemmle commissioned the construction of a set of the Paris Opera House. Because it would have to support hundreds of extras, Stage 28 on the Universal Studios lot became the first soundstage to be created with steel girders set in concrete. Until the time of its demolition on September 23, 2014, the stage still contained portions of the Opera House set, and it was the world's oldest surviving structure built for a specific film. It was shown in hundreds of films and television series. In preparation for the demolition of Stage 28, the Paris Opera House set was preserved and placed into storage.

== Reception ==
The 1925 general release version of The Phantom of the Opera.

=== Initial response ===
In a contemporary review for The New York Times, critic Mordaunt Hall wrote:

"The Phantom of the Opera" is an ultra fantastic melodrama, an ambitious production in which there is much to marvel at in the scenic effects. It has been produced with a sort of mechanical precision, and the story reminds one somewhat of a writer who always seeks for alliterative combinations. The narrative could have been fashioned in a more subtle manner and would then have been more interesting to the few. As it stands it will strike popular fancy, and the stage settings will appeal to everybody. In this presentation one perceives an effect of the interior of the Paris Opera, with people peering from the boxes and flocks of faces in the orchestra seats. There is the giant curtain which swings to with a graceful sweep, and a decorative and glistening central chandelier. All this is pictured in color, some of it a trifle weak, but most of the scenes quite effective.

Time praised the sets but felt the picture was "only pretty good". Variety wrote: "The Phantom of the Opera is not a bad film from a technical viewpoint, but revolving around the terrifying of all inmates of the Grand Opera House in Paris by a criminally insane mind behind a hideous face, the combination makes a welsh rarebit look foolish as a sleep destroyer."

=== Modern response ===
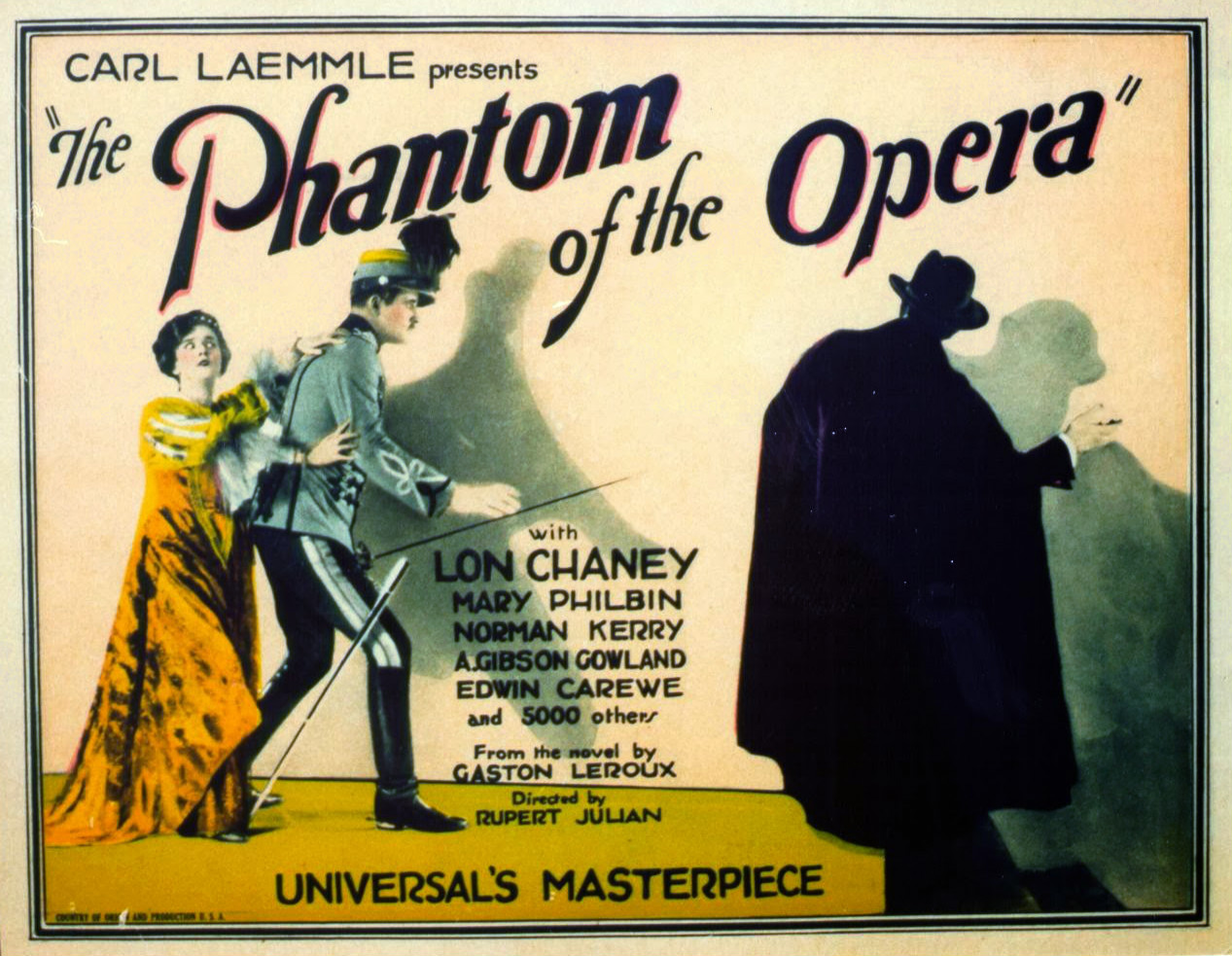
Lobby card

Roger Ebert awarded the film four out of four stars, writing: "It creates beneath the opera one of the most grotesque places in the cinema, and Chaney's performance transforms an absurd character into a haunting one." Adrian Warren of PopMatters gave the film 8/10 stars, summarizing, "Overall, The Phantom of the Opera is terrific: unsettling, beautifully shot and imbued with a dense and shadowy Gothic atmosphere. With such a strong technical and visual grounding it would have been difficult for Chaney to totally muck things up, and his performance is indeed integral, elevating an already solid horror drama into the realms of legendary cinema." Time Out gave the film a mostly positive review, criticizing the film's "hobbling exposition", but praised Chaney's performance as being the best version of the title character, as well as the film's climax.

TV Guide gave the film 4/5 stars, stating, "One of the most famous horror movies of all time, The Phantom of the Opera still manages to frighten after more than 60 years." On Rotten Tomatoes, The Phantom of the Opera holds an approval rating of 91% based on 45 reviews, with a weighted average rating of 8.3/10. The site's critical consensus reads, "Decades later, it still retains its ability to scare – and Lon Chaney's performance remains one of the benchmarks of the horror genre."

== 1929 reissue with sound ==
After the successful introduction of sound pictures during the 1928–29 release season, Universal announced that it had secured the rights to a sequel to The Phantom of the Opera from the Gaston Leroux estate. Entitled The Return of the Phantom, Leroux was hired to write the treatment for the film, in which the phantom would survive his fate and return to again stalk Christine. Leroux wrote the treatment with a tongue-in-cheek, self aware and satirical style, and the film would contain sound and would be filmed in color. Universal could not use Chaney in the film as he was now under contract at MGM.

In this surviving excerpt from the sound reissue, the Phantom's character is voiced by a messenger while the rest of Chaney's performance is silent.

Universal later scrapped the sequel and instead opted to reissue The Phantom of the Opera with a new synchronized score and sound-effects track, as well as several new dialog sequences. Directors Ernst Laemmle and Frank McCormick reshot nearly half of the film with sound in August 1929. Some scenes, including the graveyard and original "Bal Masqué" scenes, were excised for the release and are now presumed lost. The footage that was reused from the original film was scored with music arranged by Joseph Cherniavsky with sound effects. Mary Philbin and Norman Kerry reprised their roles for the sound reshoot, and Edward Martindel, George B. Williams, Phillips Smalley, Ray Holderness and Edward Davis were added to the cast to replace actors who were unavailable. Universal was contractually unable to loop Chaney's dialogue, so another character was introduced who acts as a messenger for the Phantom in some scenes. Because Chaney's talkie debut was eagerly anticipated by filmgoers, advertisements emphasized: "Lon Chaney's portrayal is a silent one!"

The sound version of Phantom opened on December 15, 1929. While a financial success, earning an additional million dollars for the studio, this version of the film received a generally lukewarm reception, with many audiences underwhelmed and confused. Lon Chaney was reportedly angered by the decision to proceed without him and to give his dialogue to the new assistant character. This strained Chaney's relationship with Universal and contributed to his hesitance to appear in Dracula (1931).

The sound version is currently believed lost, as Universal's archived reels were destroyed in a studio fire in 1948, although the soundtrack discs survived. Fans have produced extensive reconstructions since the film fell into the public domain.

The success of The Phantom of the Opera inspired Universal to finance the production of a long string of horror films through the 1950s, starting with the base stories of Dracula (1931), Frankenstein (1931), The Mummy (1932), The Invisible Man (1933), The Wolf Man (1941) and Creature from the Black Lagoon (1954), and continuing with numerous sequels to all six films.

== Differences from the novel ==
Although the 1925 adaptation is often considered the most faithful, it contains some significant plot differences from the original novel.

In the film, M. Debienne and M. Poligny transfer ownership of the opera to M. Montcharmin and M. Richard, while in the novel they are simply the old and new managers.

The character of Ledoux is not a mysterious Persian and is no longer a onetime acquaintance of the Phantom. He is now a French detective of the secret police. This character change was not originally scripted but performed during the title-card editing process.

The Phantom has no longer studied in Persia in his past. Rather, he is an escapee from Devil's Island and an expert in witchcraft.

The filmmakers initially intended to preserve the original ending of the novel and filmed scenes in which the Phantom dies of a broken heart at his organ after Christine leaves his lair. Because of the preview audience's poor reaction, the studio changed the ending to a more exciting chase sequence. Edward Sedgwick was hired to provide a climactic chase scene with an ending in which the Phantom, after having saved Ledoux and Raoul, kidnaps Christine in Raoul's carriage. He is hunted and cornered by an angry mob who beat him to death and throw him into the Seine.

== Preservation and home-video status ==
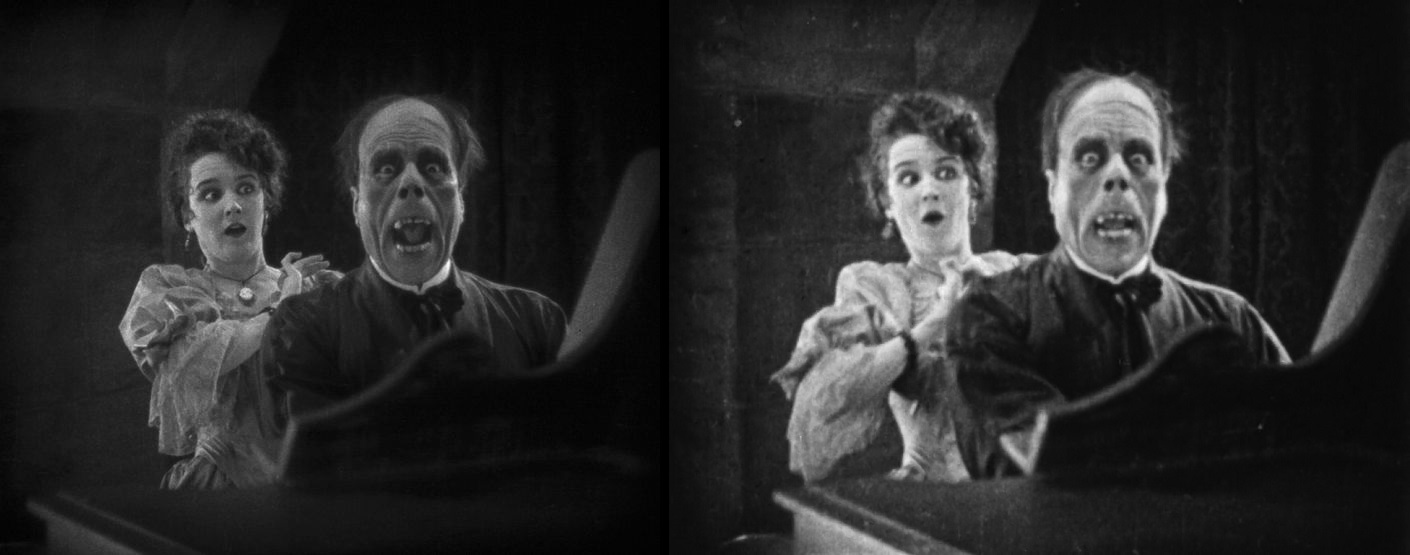
The unmasking scene that was said to have made theater patrons scream and faint in 1925. The Eastman House version is on the left, and the original 1925 version is on the right.

The finest quality print of the film existing was struck from an original camera negative for George Eastman House in the early 1950s by Universal Pictures. The original 1925 version survives only in 16mm "Show-At-Home" prints created by Universal for home movie use in the 1930s. There are several versions of these prints, but none of them are complete. All are from the original domestic camera negative.

Because of the better quality of the Eastman House print, many home video releases have opted to use it as the basis of their transfers. This version has singer Mary Fabian in the role of Carlotta. In the reedited version, Virginia Pearson, who played Carlotta in the 1925 film, is credited and referred to as "Carlotta's Mother" instead. Most of the silent footage in the 1929 version is actually from a second camera, used to photograph the film for foreign markets and second negatives; careful examination of the two versions shows similar shots are slightly askew in composition in the 1929 version. In 2009, ReelClassicDVD issued a special edition multi-disc DVD set which included a matched shot side-by-side comparison of the two versions, editing the 1925 Show-At-Home print's narrative and continuity to match the Eastman House print.

For the 2003 Image Entertainment–Photoplay Productions two-disc DVD set, the 1929 soundtrack was reedited in an attempt to fit the Eastman House print as best as possible. However, there are some problems with this attempt. There is no corresponding "man with lantern" sequence on the sound discs. While the "music and effect" reels without dialogue seem to follow the discs fairly closely, the scenes with dialogue (which at one point constituted about 60% of the film) are generally shorter than their corresponding sequences on the discs. Also, since the sound discs were synchronized with a projection speed of 24 frames per second (the established speed for sound film), and the film on the DVD is presented at a slower frame rate (to reproduce natural speed), the soundtrack on the DVD set has been altered to run more slowly than the originally recorded speed. A trailer for the sound reissue, included for the first time on the DVD set, runs at the faster sound film speed, with the audio at the correct pitch.

On November 1, 2011, Image Entertainment released a new Blu-ray version of Phantom, produced by Film Preservation Associates, the film preservation company owned by David Shepard.

On January 10, 2012, Shadowland Productions released The Phantom of the Opera: Angel of Music Edition, a two-disc DVD set featuring a newly recorded dialogue track with sound effects and an original musical score. The film was also reedited, combining elements from the 1925 version with the 1929 sound release. A 3D anaglyph version is included as an additional special feature.

=== Eastman House print mystery ===
James Card, the curator of the Eastman House, obtained the Eastman print from a 35mm acetate print in 1950 from Universal. It is uncertain for what purpose the negative used to strike the Eastman House print was produced, as it includes footage from the 1929 sound reissue, and shows few signs of wear or damage. The fact that the print originally had a title card with a Western Electric Sound System credit, however, prove that it was intended as some sort of sound version. The removed title card included credits for cameramen, synchronization and score. Current extant copies of the Eastman print have a jump cut in the titles where this title once was.

For unknown reasons, an opening prologue showing a man with a lantern has been added—using a single continuous take—but no corresponding title cards or dialogue survive. This shot seems to have been a talking sequence, but it appears in the original 1925 version, shorter in duration and using a different, close-up shot of the man with the lantern. The opening title sequence, the lantern man, the footage of Mary Fabian performing as Carlotta and Mary Philbin's opera performances are photographed at 24 frames per second (sound film speed), and therefore were shot after the film's original release. It is possible that the lantern man is meant to be Joseph Buquet, but the brief remaining close-up footage of the man from the 1925 version does not appear to be of Bernard Siegel, who plays Buquet. The man who appears in the reshot footage could be a different actor as well, but as there is no close-up of the man in this version, and the atmospheric lighting partially obscures his face, it is difficult to be certain.

While it was common practice to simultaneously shoot footage with multiple cameras for prints intended for domestic and foreign markets, the film is one of few for which footage of both versions survives (others include Buster Keaton's Steamboat Bill, Jr. and Charlie Chaplin's The Gold Rush). Comparisons of the two versions (both in black and white and in color) yield:

1. Footage of most of the scenes shot from two slightly different angles
2. Different takes for similar scenes
3. 24 fps sound scenes replacing silent scene footage
4. Variations in many rewritten dialogue and exposition cards, in the same font

Some possibilities regarding the negative's intended purpose are:

1. It is an International Sound Version for foreign markets.
2. It is a negative made for Universal Studios' reference.

==== International Sound Version ====
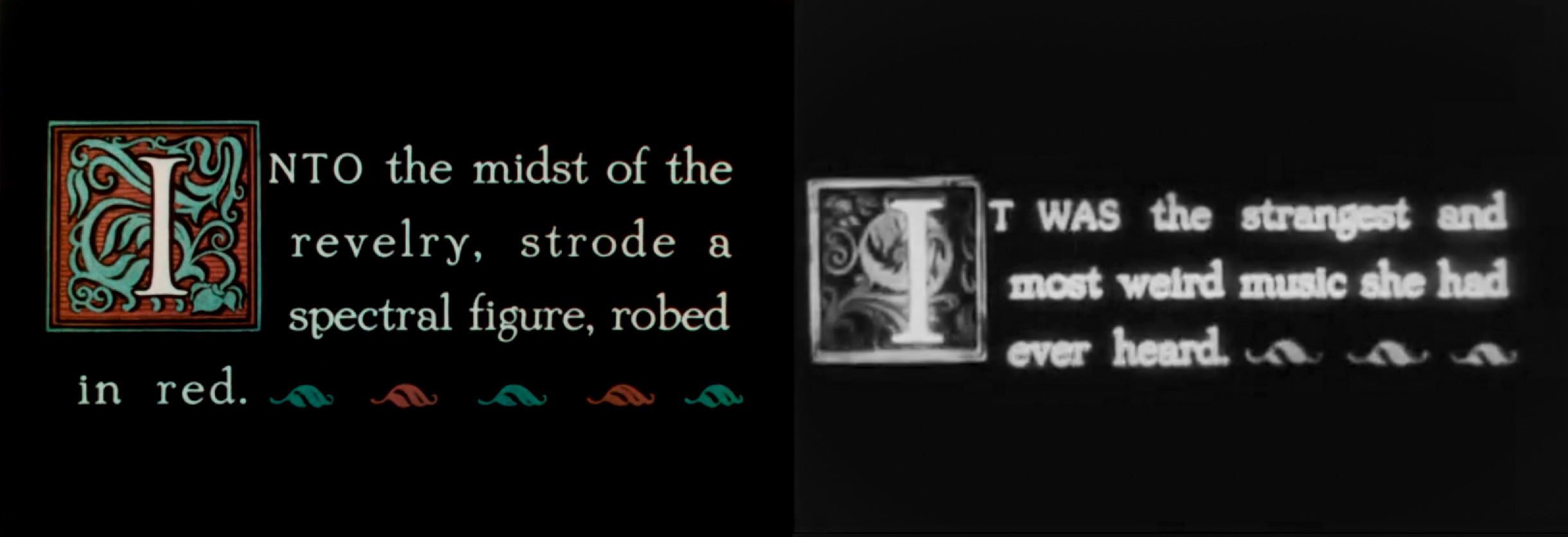
Two comparative frames of narrative titles from the 1929 sound reissue. The title on the left is from the Technicolor sequence, which survives in 35mm. On the right, a lost title card from a 16mm print-down, not sourced from the Eastman House version.

"International Sound Versions" were sometimes made of films which the producing companies judged not to be worth the expense of reshooting in a foreign language. These versions were meant to cash in on the talkie craze; by 1930 anything with sound did well at the box office, while silent films were largely ignored by the public. International sound versions were basically part-talkies, and were largely silent except for musical sequences. Since the films included synchronized music and sound effect tracks, they could be advertised as sound pictures, and therefore capitalize on the talkie craze in foreign markets without the expense of reshooting scenes with dialogue in foreign languages.

To make an international version, the studio would simply replace any spoken dialogue in the film with music, and splice in some title cards in the appropriate language. Singing sequences were left intact, as well as any sound sequences without dialogue.

The sound discs for the International Sound Version are not known to be extant. The sound discs for the domestic sound version of The Phantom of the Opera are extant, but do not synchronize with the dialogue portions of the foreign version, which have been abbreviated on the Eastman House print. The International Sound Version is known to have played in Brazil, Italy and Germany as surviving reviews prove. The existing print may therefore have been used as a master negative to strike prints to be sent overseas and then stored for safekeeping. This would explain why the Eastman House print shows no signs of negative wear.

Furthermore, the Eastman print originally had a Western Electric sound credit in the starting credits. This credit was removed by James Card who obtained the Eastman print from a 35mm acetate print in 1950 from Universal. In the edited Eastman print that is currently available there is a jump cut which removes the production credits including cameramen, synchronization, and score. This same card carried the "Western Electric Sound System" credit.

==== Silent version ====
The sound credit on the Eastman print, now lost, proves that the version could not have been silent. During the transition to sound in 1930, it was not uncommon for two versions of a film, one silent and one sound, to play simultaneously (particularly for a film produced from Universal, which kept a dual-format policy longer than did most studios). However, according to trade journals, no silent reissue was available. Harrison's Reports, which was always careful to specify whether a silent version of a film was produced, specifically stated that "there will be no silent version." No silent version was needed, as the 1925 version was already silent. If a theater not wired for sound wanted to show the film, it would have had to exhibit the 1925 silent version.

=== Color preservation ===
The Opening Ballet and "Bal Masqué" Technicolor scenes, from a print preserved at the EYE Film Institute Netherlands.

According to Harrison's Reports, when the film was originally released, it contained 17 minutes of color footage that was retained in the 1930 partially sound version. Technicolor's records show 497 feet of color footage. Judging from trade journals and reviews, all of the opera scenes of Faust as well as the "Bal Masqué" scene were shot in Process 2 Technicolor (a two-color system). Prizmacolor sequences were also shot for the "Soldier's Night" introduction. Until recently, only the "Bal Masqué" scene survived in color; however in 2020, color footage of the ballet scene was found by the Dutch archive Eye Filmmuseum and uploaded to YouTube. In the scene on the rooftop of the opera, the Phantom's cape was colored red, using the Handschiegl color process. This effect has been replicated by computer colorization in the 1996 restoration by Kevin Brownlow's Photoplay Productions.

As with many silent films, black-and-white footage was tinted various colors to provide mood. These included amber for interiors, blue for night scenes, green for mysterious moods, red for fire and yellow (sunshine) for daylight exteriors.

== Legacy ==
In 1998, The Phantom of the Opera was selected for preservation in the National Film Registry, having been deemed "culturally, historically or aesthetically significant". It was included at No. 52, on Bravo's The 100 Scariest Movie Moments list.

The film is listed in the film reference book 1001 Movies You Must See Before You Die.

In the United States, the film is in the public domain because Universal did not renew the copyright in 1953.

An animatronic based on Lon Chaney's Phantom can be seen playing a fiery organ near the start of the Monsters Unchained: The Frankenstein Experiment ride at Universal Epic Universe.

== See also ==
- List of cult films
- List of early color feature films
- List of films in the public domain in the United States
- Phantom of the Opera (1943 film)
- Universal Monsters

== Bibliography ==
- Riley, Philip J. (1999). The making of the Phantom of the Opera: including the original 1925 shooting script (1. ed.). Absecon, NJ: MagicImage Filmbooks. ISBN 1882127331.
