= Joseph Buquet =

- The Phantom of the Opera character
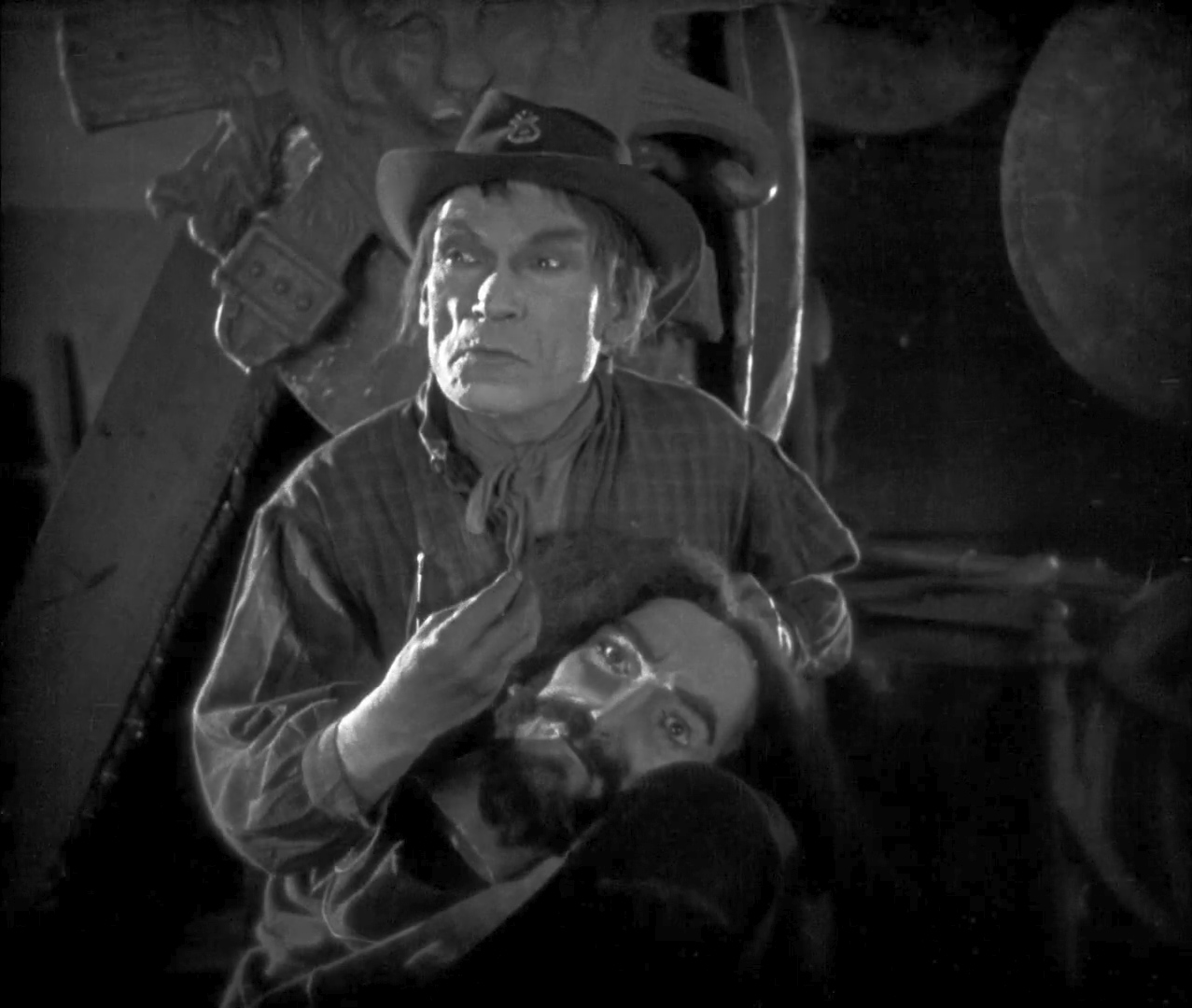
- Bernard Siegel as Joseph Buquet in Universal's 1925 silent film version of The Phantom of the Opera
- First appearance: The Phantom of the Opera
- Created by: Gaston Leroux
- Portrayed by: Bernard Siegel; Terence Beesley; André Chaumeau; Massimo Sarchielli; Kevin McNally; Nick Holder

In-universe information
- Gender: Male
- Occupation: Chief stagehand
- Nationality: French

Joseph Buquet is a fictional character in The Phantom of the Opera, the 1910 novel by French writer Gaston Leroux. He appears in many film and stage adaptations of the story.

He is the chief stagehand for the theatre who claims to have seen the Opera Ghost. In the novel he is the one to first describe Erik, saying, "He is extraordinarily thin and his dress-coat hangs on a skeleton frame. His eyes are so deep that you can hardly see the fixed pupils. You just see two big black holes, as in a dead man's skull. His skin, which is stretched across his bones like a drumhead, is not white, but a nasty yellow. His nose is so little worth talking about that you can not see it side-face; and the absence of that nose is a horrible thing to look at. All the hair he has is three or four long dark locks on his forehead and behind his ears."

In the first chapter he was found to be hanged in the third cellar between a flat and a set piece from Le roi de Lahore, right next to the entrance to the Phantom's torture chamber.

In the 1925 Lon Chaney silent film adaptation by Universal Pictures he is portrayed by Bernard Siegel and is given a brother Simon Buquet (Gibson Gowland). In the film, Joseph tells the ballerinas about the Phantom's face. His body is later found to have been hanged by the Phantom. Simon swears revenge against the Phantom and leads an angry mob into his lair and through the streets. The discovery of Joseph's dead body comes at different points in the movie depending on whether it is the original 1925 cut or the 1929 foreign cut (in the latter's case Joseph's body is not found until right before Simon starts the mob).

In the 1962 Herbert Lom movie by Hammer Film Productions an unnamed stagehand is found hanged. He is obviously supposed to be Joseph Buquet.

In the 1989 Robert Englund movie by Metro-Goldwyn-Mayer, Joseph Buquet blames the Phantom for a falling sandbag that was actually his own fault. This angers the Phantom, causing him to kill Buquet.

In Andrew Lloyd Webber's 1986 stage version, Buquet describes the Phantom's appearance to the ballet chorus and demonstrates the way to counter his "magical lasso" (the Punjab lasso, the Phantom's weapon for strangling victims). Cautioned by Madame Giry against speaking out, he is later found strangled and hanging from the stage rafters during a performance, throwing the audience into chaos. In the 2004 film, his role is the same, but additional details imply that the Phantom's rage towards Buquet might be due to the resemblance Buquet bears to a childhood abuser from the circus who would beat Erik and show off his deformity, claiming him to be the "Devil's Child". In this version Buquet is also a drunk, and is shown a few times before his death drinking from a green bottle.

In Nicholas Meyer's 1993 novel The Canary Trainer, Erik kills him as punishment for Buquet declaring his love to Christine Daaé. Irene Adler, currently performing Carmen at the Palais Garnier, hires Sherlock Holmes to investigate his death, beginning the series of events that pits Holmes against Erik.
