= The Phantom of the Opera (novel) =

1910 novel by Gaston Leroux

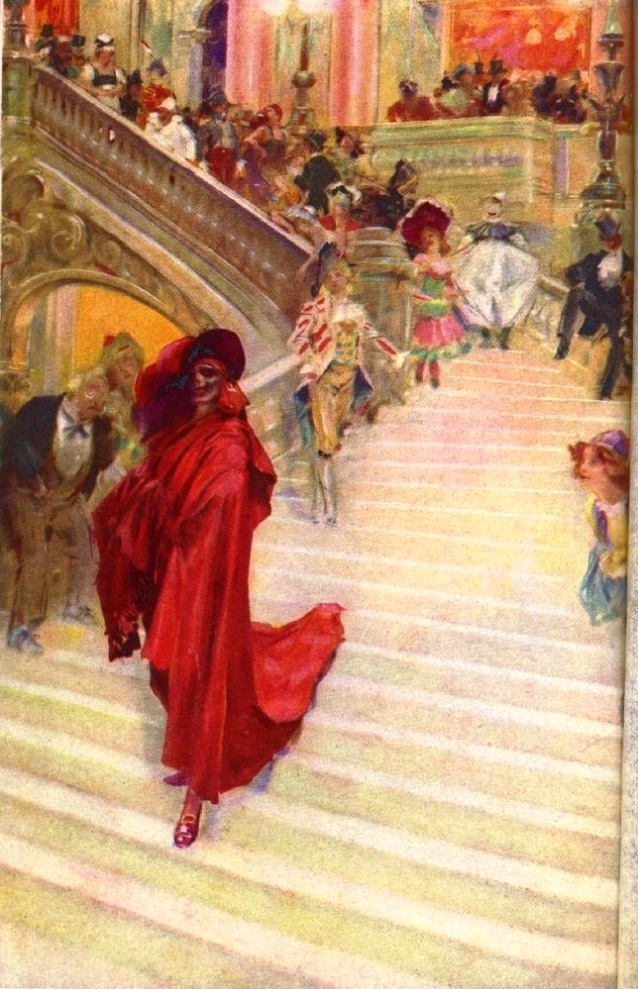
- One of the five watercolors by André Castaigne illustrating the first American edition of the Phantom of the Opera (1911)
- Author: Gaston Leroux
- Original title: Le Fantôme de l'Opéra
- Language: French
- Subject: Romance; Mystery; Gothic
- Genre: Gothic fiction, Theatre-fiction
- Set in: Paris, 1880s
- Publisher: Pierre Lafitte
- Publication date: 23 September 1909 – 8 January 1910 (magazine); March 1910 (novel)
- Publication place: France
- English publication date: 1911
- Media type: Print (Serial and paperback)
- Pages: 520
- Dewey Decimal: 843.912
- LC Class: PQ2623.E6 F213
- Original text: Le Fantôme de l'Opéra at French Wikisource
- Translation: The Phantom of the Opera at Wikisource

The Phantom of the Opera (French: Le Fantôme de l'Opéra, pronounced [lə fɑ̃tom də lɔpeʁa]) is a Gothic horror novel by French author Gaston Leroux. It was first published as a serial in Le Gaulois from 23 September 1909 to 8 January 1910, and was released in volume form in late March 1910 by Pierre Lafitte. The novel is partly inspired by historical events at the Paris Opera during the nineteenth century, and by an apocryphal tale concerning the use of a former ballet pupil's skeleton in an 1841 production of Carl Maria von Weber's Der Freischütz. It has been successfully adapted into various stage and film adaptations, most notable of which are the 1925 film depiction featuring Lon Chaney, and Andrew Lloyd Webber's 1986 musical.

== History behind the novel ==
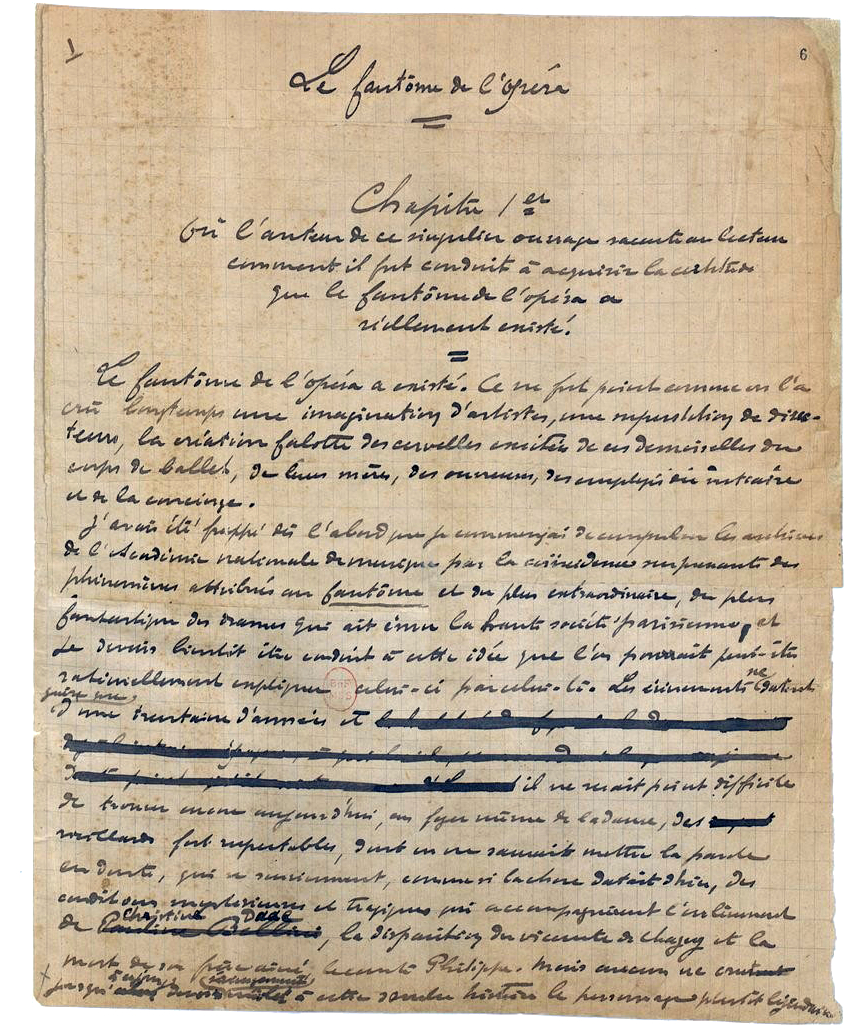
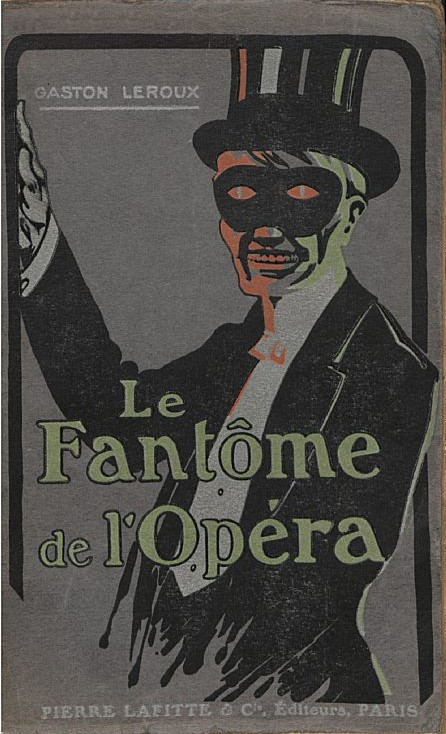
(Left) the first page of the autograph manuscript of the novel; (right) the 1910 first edition cover illustrated by Adolphe Cossard, published by Pierre Lafitte.

Leroux initially was going to be a lawyer, but after spending his inheritance gambling he became a reporter for L'Écho de Paris. At the paper, he wrote about and critiqued dramas, as well as being a courtroom reporter. With his job, he was able to travel frequently, but he returned to Paris where he became a writer. Because of his fascination with both Edgar Allan Poe and Sir Arthur Conan Doyle, he wrote a detective mystery entitled The Mystery of the Yellow Room in 1907, and four years later he published Le Fantôme de l'Opéra. The novel was first published in newspapers before finally being published as a book.

The setting of The Phantom of the Opera is the actual Paris opera house, the Palais Garnier. Leroux heard the rumours about the time the opera house was finished, and these rumours became closely linked with the novel: Act One of the opera Hellé had just finished when a fire in the roof of the opera house melted through a wire holding a counterweight for the chandelier, causing a crash that injured several and killed one. Using this accident paired with rumours of a ghost in that same opera house, Leroux wrote Le Fantôme de l'Opéra and published it in 1910, which was later published in English as The Phantom of the Opera. The underground "lake" that he wrote about, in reality an enormous cistern, does exist beneath the opera house, and it is still used for training firefighters to swim in the dark.

The serialized version contains an entire chapter ("L'enveloppe magique") that does not appear in the novel version—though much of its content was added in other chapters—and was not reprinted in English until 2014.

== Plot summary ==
In the 1880s, in Paris, the Palais Garnier Opera House is believed to be haunted by an entity known as the 'Phantom of the Opera', or simply the 'Opera Ghost', after stagehand Joseph Buquet is found hanged, the noose around his neck missing.

At a gala performance for the retirement of the opera house's managers, a young, little-known Swedish soprano, Christine Daaé, is called upon to sing in place of the opera's leading soprano, Carlotta, who is ill. Christine's performance is a success. Among the audience is the Vicomte Raoul de Chagny, who recognizes her as his childhood playmate and recalls his love for her. He attempts to visit her backstage, where he hears a man complimenting her from inside her dressing room. He investigates the room once Christine leaves, only to find it empty.

At Perros-Guirec, Christine meets with Raoul, who confronts her about the voice he heard in her room. Christine says she has been tutored by the "Angel of Music", whom her father used to tell her and Raoul about. When Raoul suggests that she might be the victim of a prank, she storms off. Christine visits her father's grave one night, where a mysterious figure appears and plays the violin for her. Raoul attempts to confront the figure but is struck and knocked out in the process.

Back at the Palais Garnier, the new managers receive a letter from the Phantom demanding that they allow Christine to perform the lead role of Marguerite in Faust and that box five be left empty for his use, lest they perform in a house with a curse on it. The managers assume his demands are a prank and ignore them. Soon after, Carlotta ends up croaking like a frog, and a chandelier drops into the audience, killing a spectator. The Phantom, having abducted Christine from her dressing room, reveals himself as a deformed man called Erik.

Erik intends to hold her prisoner in his lair with him for a few days. Still, she causes him to change his plans when she unmasks him and, to the horror of both, beholds his skull-like face. Fearing that she will leave him, he decides to hold her permanently. However, when Christine requests her release after two weeks, he agrees on the condition that she wear his ring and be faithful to him.

On the roof of the Opera House, Christine tells Raoul about her abduction and makes Raoul promise to take her away to where Erik can never find her, even if she resists. Raoul says he will act on his promise the next day. Unbeknownst to Christine and Raoul, Erik is watching them and overheard their whole conversation.

The following night, the enraged and jealous Erik abducts Christine during a production of Faust and tries to force her to marry him. Raoul is led by a mysterious Opera House regular, 'the Persian', into Erik's secret lair in the bowels of the building. Still, they end up trapped in a mirrored room by Erik, who threatens that unless Christine agrees to marry him, he will kill them and everyone in the Opera House by using explosives. Erik then drowns an intruder, later revealed to be Raoul's older brother Philippe who came to rescue him.

Under duress, Christine agrees to marry Erik. Erik initially tries to drown Raoul and the Persian, using the water which would have been used to douse the explosives. Still, Christine begs, promising him she would not kill herself after becoming his bride. Erik releases Raoul and 'the Persian' from his torture chamber.

When Erik is alone with Christine, he lifts his mask to kiss her on her forehead and is eventually given a kiss back. Erik reveals he has never kissed anyone, including his own mother, who would run away if he ever tried to kiss her. Moved, he and Christine cry together. She also holds his hand and says, "Poor, unhappy Erik", which reduces him to "a dog ready to die for her".

He allows 'the Persian' and Raoul to escape, though not before making Christine promise that she will visit him on his death day and return the ring he gave her. He also makes 'the Persian' promise that afterward, he will go to the newspaper and report his death, as he will die soon "of love."

Later, Christine returns to Erik's lair, and per his request, returns the ring and buries him 'somewhere he will never be found'. Afterward, a local newspaper runs the note: "Erik is dead". Christine and Raoul then elope together, never to return.

=== Epilogue ===
The epilogue reveals that Erik was born deformed and is the son of a construction business owner. He ran away from his native Normandy to work in fairs and caravans, schooling himself in the circus arts across Europe and Asia, and eventually building trick palaces in Persia and Turkey.

Returning to France, he started his own construction business. After being subcontracted to work on the Palais Garnier's foundations, Erik discreetly built his secret lair with hidden passages and other tricks that allowed him to spy on the managers.

== Characters ==
- Erik: The Phantom of the Opera, a deformed, mentally troubled stage magician, skilled opera enthusiast, and ventriloquist, also called 'the Angel of Music' and 'the Opera Ghost'. He voice-tutors Christine Daaé and eventually becomes obsessively infatuated with her.
- Christine Daaé: A young Swedish soprano at the Paris Opera House with whom the Phantom is obsessed.
- Vicomte Raoul de Chagny: Christine's childhood friend, with whom she renews a youthful love.
- 'The Persian': A mysterious man from Erik's past.
- Comte Philippe de Chagny: Raoul's older brother.
- Armand Moncharmin and Firmin Richard: The new managers of the opera house.
- Madame Giry: The opera's box keeper (mother of Meg Giry).
- Meg Giry: Often referred to as "Little Meg", Madame Giry's daughter, a ballet girl.
- Msrs. Debienne and Poligny: The previous managers of the opera house.
- Carlotta: A spoiled prima donna; the lead soprano of the Paris Opera House.
- Madame Valérius: The elderly guardian of Christine Daaé.

== Themes ==
=== Music ===
Leroux uses the operatic setting in The Phantom of the Opera to use music as a device for foreshadowing. Ribière makes note that Leroux was once a theatre critic and his brother was a musician, so he was knowledgeable about music and how to use it as a framing device. She uses the example of how Leroux introduces Danse macabre which means "dance of death" in the gala scene which foreshadows the graveyard scene that comes later where the Phantom plays the fiddle for Christine and attacks Raoul when he tries to intervene.

Drumright points out that music is evident throughout the novel in that it is the basis for Christine and Erik's relationship. Christine sees Erik as her Angel of Music that her father promised would come to her one day. The Phantom sees Christine as his musical protégé, and he uses his passion for music to teach her everything he knows.

=== Mystery ===
The novel is styled as a mystery novel, as its frame is narrated by a detective acquiring his information through various investigations. The mystery under investigation is the identity and motive of 'the Phantom' who lurks through the opera house, seemingly appearing out of nowhere as if by magic in inaccessible places. But, it seems that the mystery novel frame story is a façade for the genre being more a Gothic romance.

=== Gothic horror ===
In his article, Fitzpatrick compares the Phantom to other monsters featured in Gothic novels such as Frankenstein's monster, Dr. Jekyll, Dorian Gray, and Count Dracula. The Phantom has a torture chamber where he kidnaps and kills people, and the walls of the chapel in the graveyard are lined with human bones. Drumright notes that The Phantom of the Opera checks off every trope necessary to have a Gothic novel according to the Encyclopedia of Literature's description which says, "Such novels were expected to be dark and tempestuous and full of ghosts, madness, outrage, superstition, and revenge." Although the Phantom is really just a deformed man, he has ghost-like qualities in that no one can ever find him or his lair and he is seen as a monster. People are frightened by him because of his deformities and the acts of violence he commits.

=== Romance ===
The novel features a love triangle between the Phantom, Christine, and Raoul. Raoul is seen as Christine's childhood love whom she is familiar with and has affection for. He is rich and therefore offers her security as well as a wholesome, Christian marriage. The Phantom, on the other hand, is not familiar. He is dark, ugly and dangerous, and therefore represents the forbidden love. However, Christine is drawn to him because she sees him as her Angel of Music, and she pities his existence of loneliness and darkness.

== Critical reception ==
By the time Leroux published The Phantom of the Opera, he had already gained credibility as a crime mystery author in both French- and English-speaking countries. He had written six novels prior, two of which had garnered substantial popularity within their first year of publication: The Mystery of the Yellow Room and The Perfume of the Lady in Black. Although previous commentators have asserted that The Phantom of the Opera did not attain as much success as these previous novels, being particularly unpopular in France where it was first published, recent research into the novel's early reception and sales has indicated the contrary. One book review from the New York Times expressed disappointment in the way the phantom was portrayed, saying that the feeling of suspense and horror is lost once it is found out that the phantom is just a man. The majority of the notability that the novel acquired early on was due to its publication in a series of instalments in French, American, and English newspapers. This serialized version of the story became important when it was read and sought out by Universal Pictures to be adapted into a movie in 1925. Leroux did not live to see all the success from his novel and its subsequent critical re-evaluation; he died in April 1927.

== Adaptations ==
The Phantom of the Opera, with tinting (20 fps)

There have been many literary and other dramatic works based on Leroux's novel, ranging from stage musicals to films to children's books. Some well-known stage and screen adaptations of the novel are the 1925 film and the Andrew Lloyd Webber musical.

Leroux's novel was made into two silent films. The first film version, a German adaptation called Das Gespenst im Opernhaus, is now a lost film. It was made in 1916 and was directed by Ernest Matray.

The next adaptation, a 1925 Universal Studios silent film, stars Lon Chaney as the Phantom. Due to tensions on the set, there was a switch in directors and Edward Sedgwick finished the film while changing the direction of the movie. His take on the novel, making it a dark romantic movie with comedy, was not popular with audiences. Finally, the film was reworked one last time by Maurice Pivar and Lois Weber. They removed most of Sedgwick's contributions and returned to the original focus. This time, the movie was a success with audiences.

The most famous adaptation of the novel was Andrew Lloyd Webber's 1986 musical of the same name. With his second-hand copy of the novel and his artistic goals set on creating a major romantic piece, Lloyd Webber and his team wrote a musical that honored the original text while crafting a story that resonated deeply with audiences at the time. During the show's development, however, there were disagreements over whether it was "inspired by" or "based on" Gaston Leroux's novel. Bill O'Connell, an assistant to film producers in New York at the time, contended for the show to appear as "based on" rather than "inspired by", as he viewed the latter as a minimization of Gaston Leroux's original involvement with the story.

Lawyers for producer Cameron Mackintosh and Webber's Really Useful Theatre Company responded, saying that it was never their intention "to fail to give appropriate prominence to the contribution of M. Leroux". They did not, however, use the "based on" wording and instead used "inspired by" in the show's playbill, much to O'Connell's dismay. This musical adaptation, which won some of the most prestigious theatre awards in the UK and the US, first premiered in London in 1986 and on Broadway in 1988. Phantom has since become the longest-running musical on Broadway (it ran for 35 years before closing in 2023) and is still running in London (the second longest-running West End musical behind Les Misérables). The show has also received multiple international productions and translations, yet has never been performed professionally in France.
