= Daqing Oil Field =

Largest oil field in China

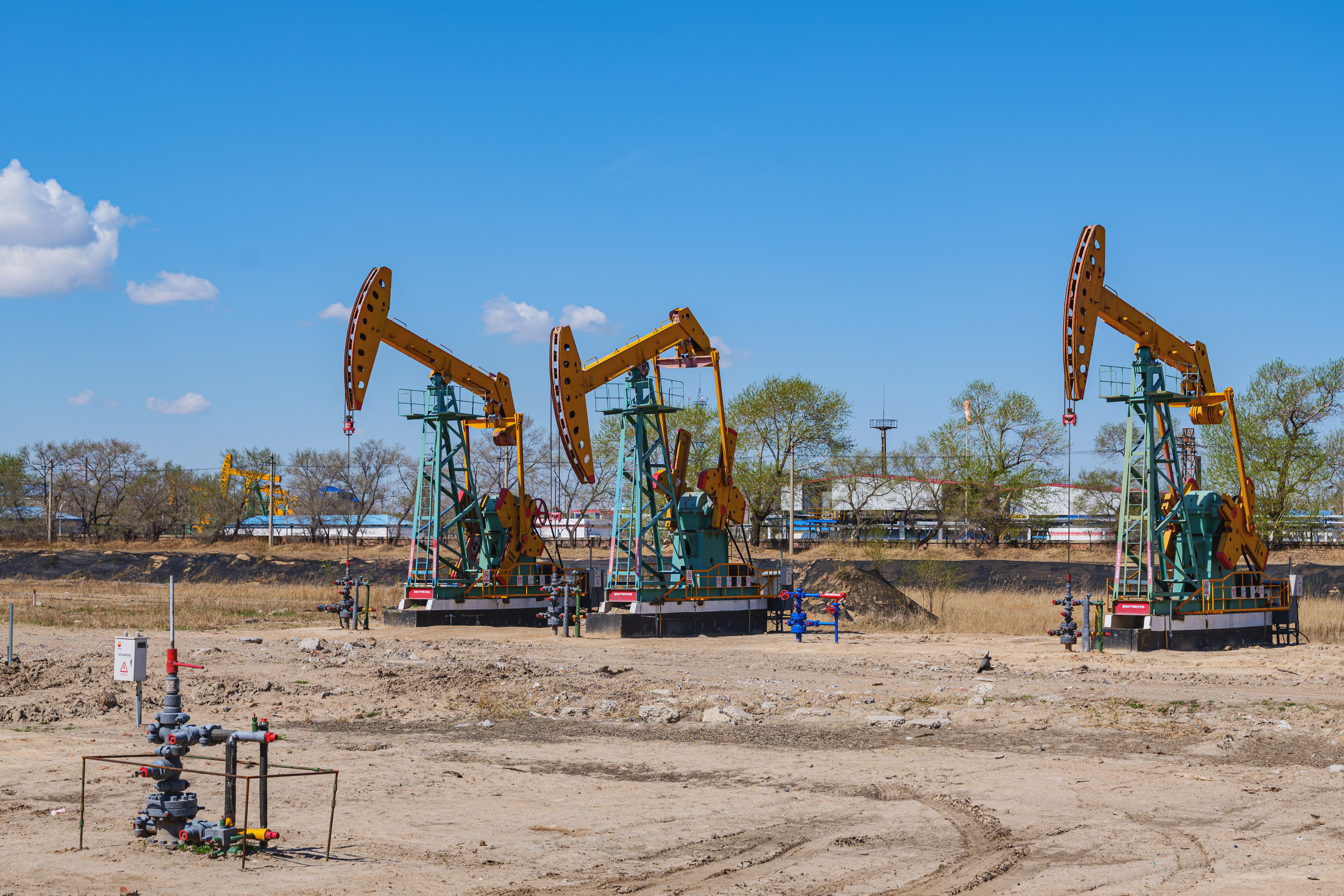

- Location within China
- Country: China
- Region: Heilongjiang province
- Offshore/onshore: Onshore
- Coordinates: 46.60°N 124.90°E
- Operator: Daqing Oilfield Company Limited

Field history
- Discovery: 1959
- Start of production: 1960
- Peak year: 2008

Production
- Current production of oil: 600,000 barrels per day (~3.0×10^{7} t/a)
- Year of current production of oil: 2021
- Peak of production (oil): 800,000 barrels per day (~4.0×10^{7} t/a)
- Estimated oil in place: 16,000 million barrels (~2.2×10^{9} t)
- Recoverable oil: 3,600 million barrels (~4.9×10^{8} t)

Daqing Oil Field
- Simplified Chinese: 大庆油田
- Traditional Chinese: 大慶油田
Transcriptions
Standard Mandarin
- Hanyu Pinyin: Dàqìng Yóutián
- Wade–Giles: Ta^{4}-ch'ing^{4} Yu^{2}-t'ien^{2}

The Daqing Oil Field (Chinese: 大庆油田, formerly romanized as Taching) is the largest oil field in the People's Republic of China, located between the Songhua river and Nen River in Heilongjiang province. When the Chinese government began to use pinyin for romanization, the field's name became known as Daqing.

It is the largest oil deposit discovered in China and its ability to support China's industrialization changed the country's developmental path. Daqing oil field contained 16 billion barrels (2.5×10^{9} m^{3}) or 2.2 billion tons in the beginning and has produced over 10 billion barrels (1.6×10^{9} m^{3}) of oil since production started in 1960; the remaining recoverable reserves are about 3.6 billion barrels (570×10^{6} m^{3}) or 500 million tons.

== History ==
Daqing oil field is located in the Songliao Basin, a large sedimentary basin that is in the tectonic framework of the North China-Mongolia tract.

In 1959, the oil field was discovered by Li Siguang. Iron Man Wang Jinxi (who led No. 1205 drilling team) worked on this oilfield. The first oil well was drilled on September 26, 1959. Because the success occurred four days before the tenth anniversary of the People's Republic of China, the field was named Daqing, meaning "great celebration." The discovery of the oil field made the Manchuria region a national center for the oil industry.

During its 1960 construction during the Great Leap Forward, Oil Minister Yu Qiuli mobilized workers building the Daqing oil field through ideological motivation instead of material incentives, focusing enthusiasm, energy, and resources to complete a rapid industrialization project. The successful construction of the Daqing oil field despite harsh weather conditions and supply limitations became a model held up by the Communist Party as an example during subsequent industrialization campaigns.

In April 1960, Yu stated that Mao Zedong's texts On Practice and On Contradiction should be the ideological core of the Daqing oil field campaign. The Ministry of the Petroleum Industry shipped thousands of copies by plane so that every Daqing oil worker would have copies and for work units to each set up their own study groups.

The municipality developed around the oil field shared the same administrative body with the oil field production until 1983.

Daqing oil field was a secret until 1964. On February 5, 1964, the central Party promoted Daqing oil field to other industrial enterprises, instructing them to follow the "all-out battle" tactics of Daqing oil field. Shortly afterwards, Mao Zedong praised the Daqing oil field at an education work conference, stating that with a "little investment" in a "short period of time" a "great achievement" had been finished. People's Daily and other state media published numerous articles on Daqing in 1964, extolling the self-discipline of Daqing workers, their study of Mao Zedong thought, and the technical achievements resulting from the democratic participation of workers. Most significant among these articles was the April 20, 1964 piece "Daqing People, Daqing Spirit" which People's Daily published. The article compared Daqing to Yan'an, the base area where the Communist Party regrouped after the Long March. Promoted as a model of industrial development, Daqing was also promoted as a model of town building.

The field was financed through commodity-backed loans that China obtained from Japan. China repaid these loans with oil.

The project delivered critical economic benefits because without the production of the Daqing oil field, crude oil would have been severely limited after the Soviet Union cut off supplies as a result of the Sino-Soviet split.

The first two years of the Cultural Revolution resulted in major disruptions to China's petroleum industry and an oil shortage by 1967. In March of that year, the People's Liberation Army was called to Daqing to maintain order so that oil production could proceed. This made Daqing one of the first places brought under military control during the Cultural Revolution. In May 1968, the Daqing Revolutionary Committee was established. Iron Man Wang became its vice director. The Daqing Oil Field was among 2,400 central state-owned enterprises transferred to local government control in 1970. The Daqing oil field continued to be a major driver of economic growth through during the chaotic Cultural Revolution era.

During the period 1964 to 1980, the oil field accounted for more than half of China's crude oil production per year. In 1966, crude oil production in Daqing reached 10 million metric tons and the number of workers at Daqing reached 58,000.

In the mid-1980s, the oil field generated 3% of China's state revenue through a combination of the profits and tax payments it supplied.

As of 2013 the field's production rate was about 800,000 barrels per day (130,000 m^{3}/d).

Daqing Oilfield Company Limited, based in Daqing, is the operator of exploration and development of Daqing Oilfield. From 2004, the company plans to cut its crude oil output by an annual 7% for the next seven years to extend the life of Daqing.

Output of barrels of oil equivalent of the Daqing Field remained stable at over 40 million tons in 2012, while output at Changqing oil field was over 42 million tons, making it the most productive oil and gas field in China.

Crude output from the ageing Daqing oilfield is in decline even though the CNPC deployed some non-traditional drilling techniques. In 2019, output fell to 30.9 million tonnes from 32 million tonnes in 2018. At its peak in 2008, output stood at 40 million tonnes a year. The production was 30 million tonnes in 2021.

A new shale oil field was discovered in Daqing Oilfield in 2021, with an estimated geological reserve of 1.268 billion tons.

== Ideological significance ==
The Chinese government promoted the success of the Daqing oilfield and the selflessness of workers who built it as part of the face of new the socialist industrial person that China sought to encourage in the 1960s and 1970s. The Chinese press urged industrial workers to follow the model of ascetic living practiced by workers on the Daqing oilfield in order to advance China's development of socialist modernity. Recruitment events for the Third Front construction, a massive campaign to develop basic industry and national defense industry in China's interior in case of invasion by the United States or the Soviet Union, urged prospective Third Front workers to learn from the Daqing oil field and "use revolutionary spirit to avoid all difficulties." During the Third Front, the model of the Daqing oilfield went from being a slogan to a fundamental principle behind the centrally directed and militarized industrialization campaign.

"Iron Man" Wang Jinxi was the most significant model worker in Daqing oil field, and remains one of the most celebrated working class models in China. An experienced oil worker from the Yumen Oil Field, Wang was one of the first oil workers to arrive to work the Daqing field in Saertu. At Daqing, Wang was one of the first model workers selected by Yu Qiuli due to Wang's devotion to the oil production industry and to competitive work. Wang was also the inspiration for Zhou Tingshan, the main character in 1974 drama Chuangye.

== Administration ==
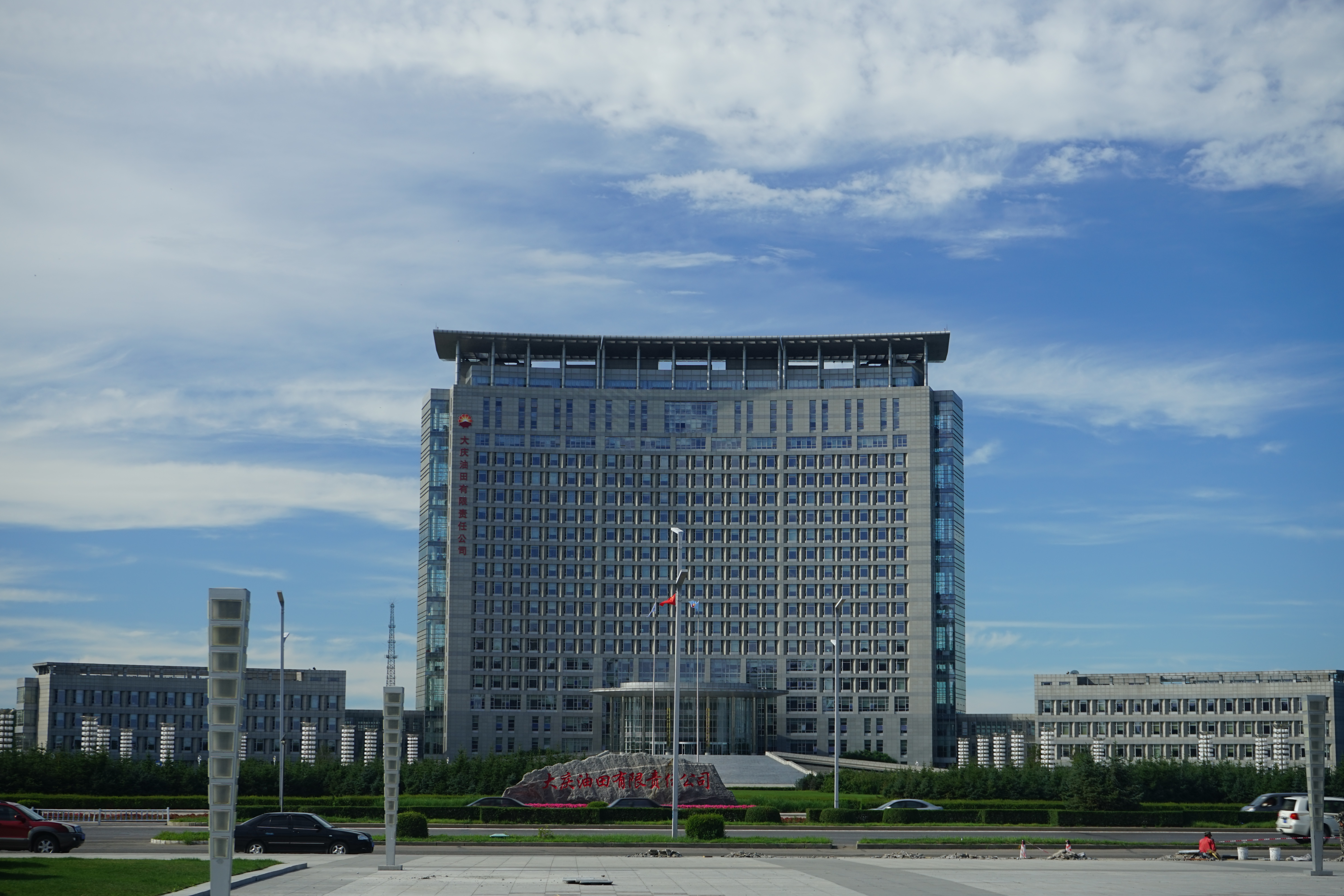
Main building of the Daqing Oil Field Company Limited

The Daqing Oil Field Management Bureau and PetroChina Daqing Company are located in West Town in Daqing.

== In popular culture ==
In 1964, chief director of the Central Experimental Theater Sun Weishi and her husband, the actor Jin Shan, traveled to Daqing to live and work with the oil workers and their families. The next year, the Communist Party journal Red Flag published an article by Sun which praised the Daqing people. After living in Daqing for two years, Sun Weishi returned to Beijing to produce the play The Rising Sun, which was based on the experiences of people in Daqing, particularly Daqing women.

It is featured as a map in first-person shooter video game Battlefield 2.

It was also featured in a dedicated part of the How Yukong Moved the Mountains documentary, "About Petroleum".

== See also ==
- List of oil fields
