= Bingwen =

Bingwen is a Chinese masculine given name. Bearers of the name include:

- Geng Bingwen (1334–1403), Ming dynasty general
- Su Bingwen (1892–1975), Nationalist Chinese general
- Sun Bingwen (1885–1927), Chinese communist revolutionary
- Bingwen, a character in Orson Scott Card's Formic Wars series, first appearing in Earth Afire
