= Yeban gesheng =

Yeban gesheng (simplified Chinese: 夜半歌声; traditional Chinese: 夜半歌聲; pinyin: yèbàn gēshēng; lit. 'Midnight Song') is the title of several Chinese-language films:

- Song at Midnight (1937)
- The Mid-Nightmare (1962—Part I), (1963—Part II)
- The Phantom Lover (1995)
