= Ma-Xu Weibang =

Chinese film director

Ma-Xu Weibang (simplified Chinese: 马徐维邦; traditional Chinese: 馬徐維邦; pinyin: Mǎ-Xú Wéibāng; 1905–1961) was a Chinese film director active in mainland China from the 1920s to 1940s, and later in Hong Kong, perhaps best known for his work in the horror genre, the most important inarguably being The Phantom of the Opera-inspired, Song at Midnight. Ma-Xu was also known for a few acting roles early in his career, as well as for being a screenwriter. The director of 33 known films, much of Ma-Xu's early work has been lost.

Ma-Xu was born Xu Weibang in 1905 in Hangzhou, Zhejiang. Little is known of this early period except that his parents died while Ma-Xu was still a child, which was said to influence his decision to incorporate his wife's surname, "Ma".

== Career in film ==
Ma-Xu studied at the Shanghai Institute of Fine Arts in the early 1920s. Following his graduation, he began working as an actor for the Mingxing Film Company, his first film being Zhang Shichuan's The Marriage Trap in 1924. Following a brief stint in the short-lived Langhua Film Company where he directed his first film in 1926, Ma-Xu returned to Mingxing where he began serving as assistant directors for some of the more established talent. His thriller, The Cry of Apes in a Deserted Valley is the only one of these directorial efforts to have survived.

Ma-Xu's first real success, however, did not come until 1937 with Song at Midnight, often referred to as China's first horror film. Based on Gaston Leroux's classic novel The Phantom of the Opera, the film is now seen as part of the canon of early Chinese cinema, and was also remade as The Phantom Lover by Ronny Yu in 1996. Ma-Xu followed up Song with two additional horror films, Walking Corpse in an Old House (1938) and The Lonely Soul (1938). In 1941, he made a lackluster sequel to Song at Midnight (during the height of the Second Sino-Japanese War), and also co-directed with Bu Wancang the controversial Japanese propaganda film Eternity (also known as The Opium War).

Like Bu, Ma-Xu suffered for his work on The Opium War after the Japanese were defeated and was eventually forced to move to Hong Kong, where he continued to work in the film business until 1961, when he was killed in a road accident.

== Filmography ==
Note: in most early Chinese films, there often were no official English translations, leading to a sometimes confusing lack of consistency in titles.

Year	English Title	Chinese Title	Notes
1926	The Love Freak	Qing chang guai ren	Presumed lost
1928	Freak in the Night	Hei ye guai ren	Presumed lost
1929	The Devil Incarnate	Hun shi mo wang	Presumed lost
1930	The Cry of Apes in a Deserted Valley	Kong gu yuan sheng	
1934	Pear Blossom in the Storm	暴雨梨花	Presumed lost
1934	Prison of Love	Ai yu	Presumed lost
1935	Han jiang luo yan		
1937	Song at Midnight	夜半歌聲	
1938	Walking Corpse in an Old House	Gu wu xing shi ji	
1938	The Lonely Soul	Leng yue shi hun	
1939	Ma feng nu	麻瘋女	
1940	Diao Liu shi		
1941	Song at Midnight, Part II	夜半歌聲續集	
1941	Xian dai qing nian		
1942	Yuan yang lei		
1943	Eternity	萬世流芳	
1943	Qiu Haitang		
1947	Tian luo di wang		
1947	Chun can meng duan	春殘夢斷	
1949	Mei yan qin wang		
1949	A Maid's Bitter Story	瓊樓恨	Also known as The Haunted House
1954	Blood Stained Flowers	Bi xue huang hua	
1955	Xin yu guang qu		
1956	Wo xin chang dan	臥薪嘗膽	Also known as Dangerous Beauty or Beauty of the Beauties
1956	Ghost at Midnight	午夜魂歸	Also known as Foggy Night, Fright Night
1957	The Resurrected Rose	Fu huo de mei gui	
1957	Booze, Boobs, and Bucks	酒色財氣	
1958	Young Vagabond	流浪兒	Also known as The Vagabond Boy
1958	Hong fu si ben		
1959	The Lovers and the Python	毒蟒情鴛	
