= Sun Weishi =

Chinese dramaticist (1921–1968)

- 孙维世
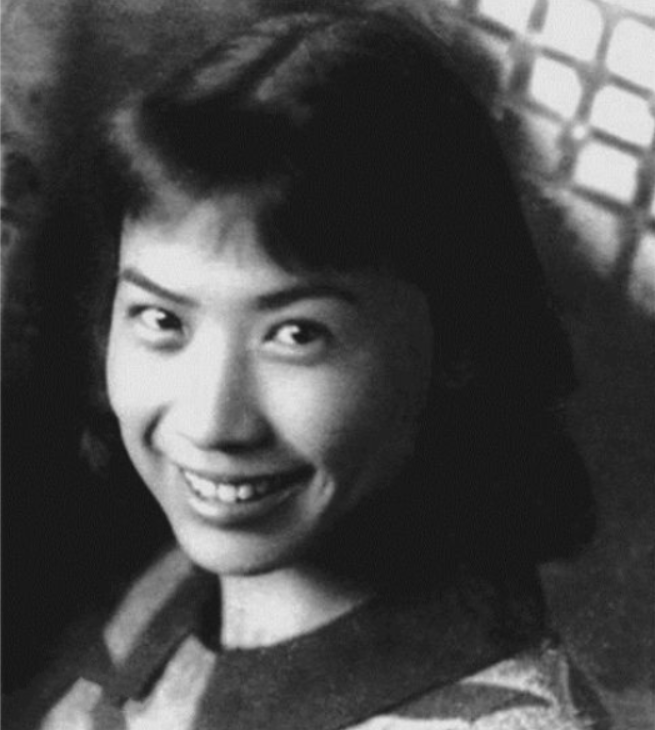
- Born: 30 November 1921; Nanxi County, Sichuan, Republic of China
- Died: 15 October 1968 (aged 46); Beijing, China
- Cause of death: Torture and prison maltreatment
- Other name: Li Lin (李琳)
- Education: Moscow Institute of Oriental Studies
- Occupations: Writer, director, actress
- Notable work: How Steel is Made; The Inspector General; Little Rabbit; Uncle Vanya; Joys and Sorrows; Peach Flower Fan; Portrait of One Hundred Clowns; The Hatred of Black Slaves; The Rising Sun
- Political party: Chinese Communist Party
- Spouse: Jin Shan
- Children: 1 (Sun Xiaolan)(adopted)
- Parent(s): Sun Bingwen (1885–1927); Ren Rui (1891-1949)
- Relatives: Sun Yang (brother); Sun Mingshi (brother); Sun Jishi (brother); Sun Xingshi (sister); Zhou Enlai (adopted father); Deng Yingchao (adopted mother)

Sun Weishi
- Traditional Chinese: 孫維世
- Simplified Chinese: 孙维世
Transcriptions
Standard Mandarin
- Hanyu Pinyin: Sūn Wéishì
- Wade–Giles: Sun1 Wei2-shih4

Sun Weishi (Chinese: 孙维世; 30 November 1921 – 15 October 1968) was the first female director of modern spoken drama (huaju) in Chinese history. Sun's father was killed by the Kuomintang (KMT) in 1927, and Sun was eventually adopted by Zhou Enlai, who later became the first premier of the People's Republic of China. While in Yan'an, Sun aroused the enmity of Mao's wife, Jiang Qing, beginning a rivalry between the two that lasted throughout Sun's life until her ultimate death at Jiang's hands. During World War II, Sun lived in Moscow, studying theater. Lin Biao was also in Moscow at the time and proposed to Sun before returning to China in 1942, but Sun rejected him. Lin married another woman, Ye Qun, in 1943. Ye held a lifelong grudge against Sun for her earlier relationship with Lin.

After the end of World War II, Sun returned to China and became active in acting and directing in Chinese theater. In 1950, shortly after the founding of the People's Republic of China, Sun was invited to become the director of the China Youth Art Theater, and married one of the most famous actors then in China the same year. Over the next several years Sun staged performances that were critically well-received, some of which became famous across China. In 1956, Sun became the artistic director and vice-president of the Chinese Experimental Theater.

When the Cultural Revolution occurred in 1966, Zhou Enlai sent Sun and her husband to work in Daqing to protect them from political persecution, but Jiang Qing and Ye Qun conspired to have Sun secretly arrested in 1968 while visiting Zhou Enlai in Beijing. Sun was sentenced without trial, and was tortured in a secret prison for several months before dying. After Sun died, Jiang Qing made arrangements for Sun's body to be cremated before an autopsy could be performed, and for her ashes to be disposed of before Zhou or Sun's other relatives could take possession of them. Sun's husband was not informed of Sun's death until his release, in 1975.

== Biography ==
=== Family background ===
Sun's father, Sun Bingwen, was recruited by Zhou Enlai to join the Chinese Communist Party (CCP) in Germany, and subsequently became a close friend of both Zhu De and Zhou Enlai. After studying abroad in the Soviet Union, Sun Bingwen returned to China in 1924 and joined the faculty of Whampoa Academy. In 1926, Sun was appointed the General Secretary of the General Political Department of the National Revolutionary Army. After the relationship between the KMT and CCP deteriorated Sun Bingwen was arrested on 16 April 1927 and executed four days later, during the White Terror. When Sun Bingwen died Sun Weishi was only six years old.

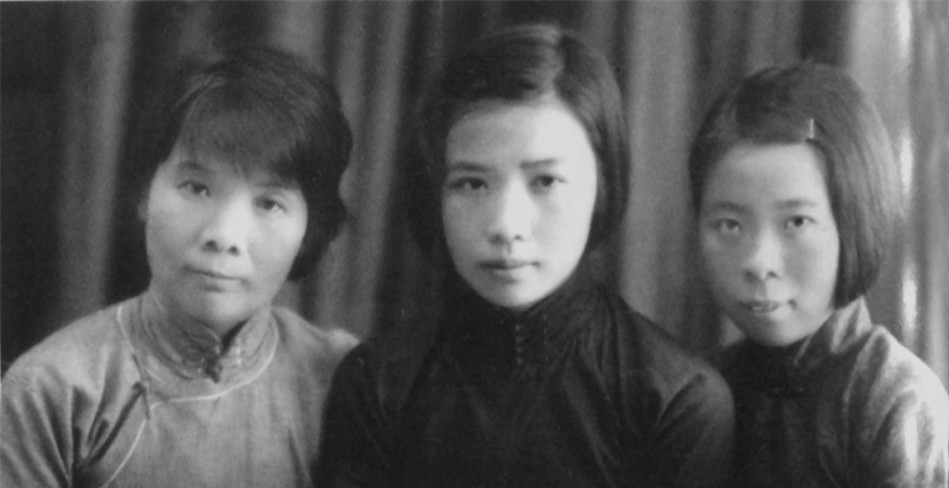
Sun (center) with her mother Ren Rui (left) and aunt Ren Jun

Following her father's death, Sun Weishi's mother, Ren Rui, took the family into exile, raising Sun Weishi and her three siblings alone while participating in CCP underground work. In 1935, when Sun was only fourteen, Sun's mother entrusted her to a leftist acting troupe based in Shanghai. In order to hide her identity and keep her safe, Sun's name was changed to "Li Lin" until 1937. Ren Rui died on 11 April 1949, reportedly due to illness from overwork.

Sun Weishi had three siblings, one sister and two brothers. One of Sun Weishi's brothers, Sun Yang, was imprisoned with his father in 1927, when he was only twelve. Sun Yang was eventually released, became Zhu De's personal assistant, and became the president of Renmin University after the founding of the People's Republic of China. In 1967 Jiang Qing accused Sun Yang of being a spy for the Soviet Union, the Japanese, and the Kuomintang, and Sun Yang was tortured and killed by Maoist Red Guards in the basement of his own university. Sun Weishi's other brother, Sun Mingshi, died in combat fighting for the CCP against the KMT. Sun's sister, Sun Xingshi, taught at the Foreign Languages Department at Peking University. In 1975, Sun Xingshi married Sun Weishi's widower, Jin Shan, who had been imprisoned throughout the Cultural Revolution for his association with Sun Weishi.

=== Joining the Chinese Communist Party ===
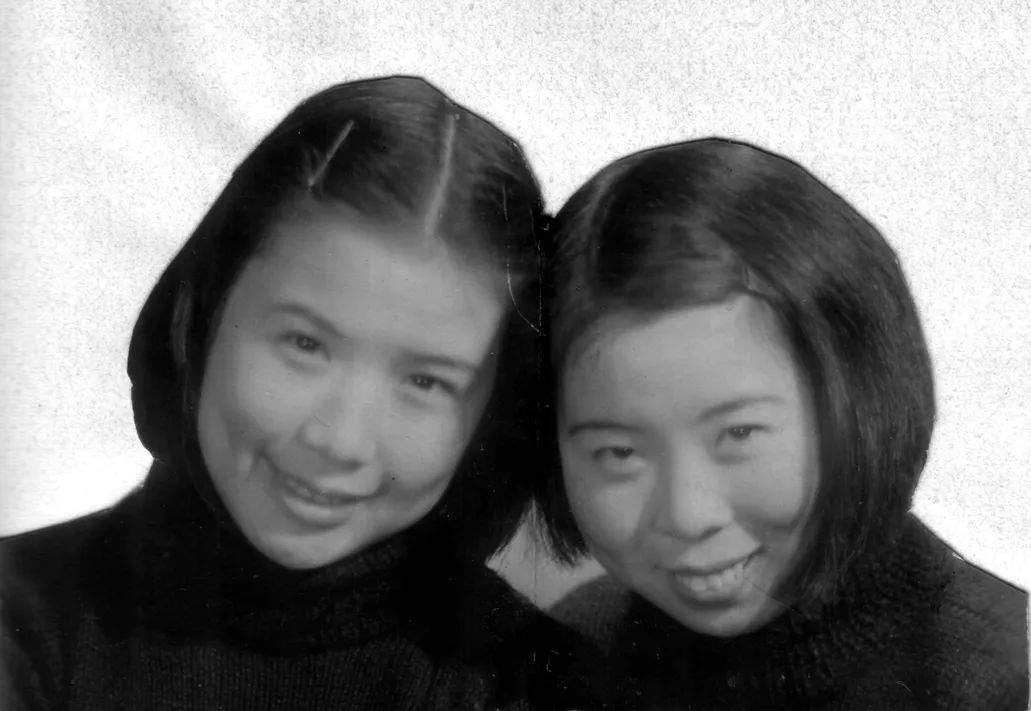
Sun (left) with her aunt Ren Jun

In 1937, when she was only sixteen, Sun traveled to Wuhan to request permission to travel to the CCP revolutionary base area in Yan'an, but was refused due to her youth and lack of political connections. Sun's father's old friend, Zhou Enlai (who was childless), found Sun crying outside of the Eighth Route Army Liaison Office, and promptly adopted Sun as his daughter. With Zhou's assistance, Sun was able to travel to Yan'an, and promptly joined the CCP in 1938.

After arriving in Yan'an, Sun was introduced to Mao Zedong and Zhou's wife, Deng Yingchao, and got along well with them both. Lin Biao was rumored to have developed a romantic interest in Sun while they were both in Yan'an, but Sun did not reciprocate due to Lin's age.

In Yan'an Sun enrolled in the Counter-Japanese Military and Political University with her mother, and became active in theater. Jiang Qing, when she was single and new to Yan'an, once auditioned for a play with Sun. Jiang was given a minor role, while Sun was given the lead. In comparison to Jiang, Sun was compared as being a far superior actress, more attractive, and seven years younger. Jiang never went onstage again.

Soon after arriving in Yan'an, Jiang began a romantic affair with Xu Yixin, a senior teacher at Lu Xun College, and fell in love with him. Xu soon became infatuated with Sun Weishi, and Sun reciprocated this affection. Jiang's jealousy over Sun's acting ability, and Sun's ability to attract men that Jiang was also attracted to, was the beginning of a long-lasting hatred that Jiang held for Sun.

=== Education in Moscow ===
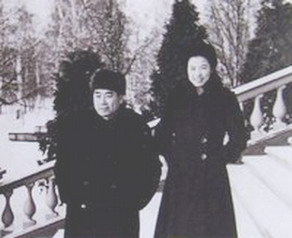
Sun and Zhou in Moscow, 1939.

Sun accompanied Zhou Enlai to the Soviet Union in the summer of 1939, when Zhou flew to Moscow to seek medical treatment for a broken arm. Sun accompanied Zhou as his personal assistant, and studied Russian in her spare time. Sun remained in the Soviet Union when Zhou returned to China in 1940, studying theater at Moscow Institute of Oriental Studies.

In 1937 Lin Biao was injured in an incident with the army of Yan Xishan, flew to Moscow for medical attention, and remained there until 1942. Before returning to China Lin proposed to Sun and promised to divorce his wife, from whom Lin was estranged. Sun was not able to accept Lin's proposal, but promised to consider marrying Lin after completing her studies. Lin divorced his wife after returning to China in 1942, and married another woman, Ye Qun, in 1943. The relationship between Sun and Ye was notably bad.

Sun completed her studies and returned to China in September 1946, and participated in the land reform movement in CCP-controlled Shanxi. Sun then joined the cast of a traveling theater group, performing in Shanxi, Shaanxi, and Hebei. In 1949, Sun was the head of the interpreting team that accompanied Mao Zedong on his state visit to the Soviet Union. After Sun returned to China, Jiang Qing, who was now Mao's wife, continued her rivalry with Sun.

=== Early artistic career ===
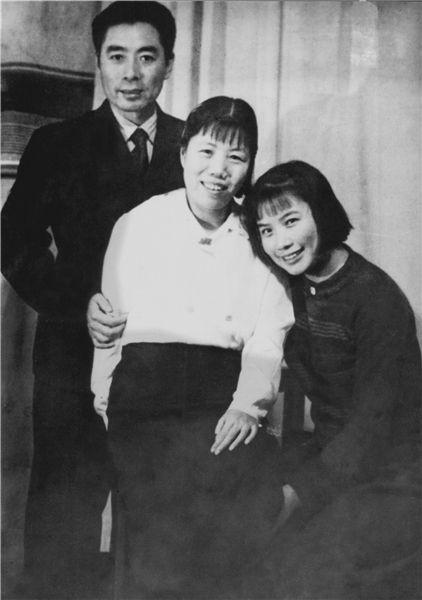
Sun (right) with Zhou (left) and Deng Yingchao

Shortly after Sun returned to China, in the spring of 1950, Liao Chengzhi invited Sun to become the artistic director of the China Youth Art Theater, which he had founded. Sun enthusiastically accepted, and began work on establishing the first professional theater to stage shows in colloquial Mandarin in the PRC. The first play that Sun directed was How Steel is Made, a play based on an eponymous Russian novel written by Nikolai Ostrovsky.

How Steel is Made, based on its author's own experiences, was a story about a revolutionary named Pavel Korchaghin who had been crippled while fighting in a revolutionary war, but who eventually overcame great difficulties to become a successful writer. The play was extremely successful, and is considered the first example of modern spoken drama produced in the PRC. The lead character of Pavel (played by Jin Shan) became a household name in China during the early 1950s.

In 1952 Sun produced "the most successful foreign classic ever mounted on the PRC Stage", Gogol's the Inspector-General. In 1952 Sun also produced a play in celebration of the founding of the Children's Art Theater, Little Rabbit. Little Rabbit was made into a film by the Beijing Film Studio in 1953, and is still considered one of the best children's plays ever produced in the PRC.

In 1954, on the fiftieth anniversary of Anton Chekov's death in 1904, Sun produced one of Chekov's plays, Uncle Vanya, in collaboration with a Soviet expert. From 1954 to 1956, Sun also worked as the principal instructor of directors with the China Central Drama College.

During the 1950s Sun also translated numerous other foreign plays, including, the Servant of Two Masters. One of the plays she directed during this period was based on the life of Princess Wencheng.

Sun earned significant prestige through directing Soviet dramas for the Beijing stage.

=== Marriage ===
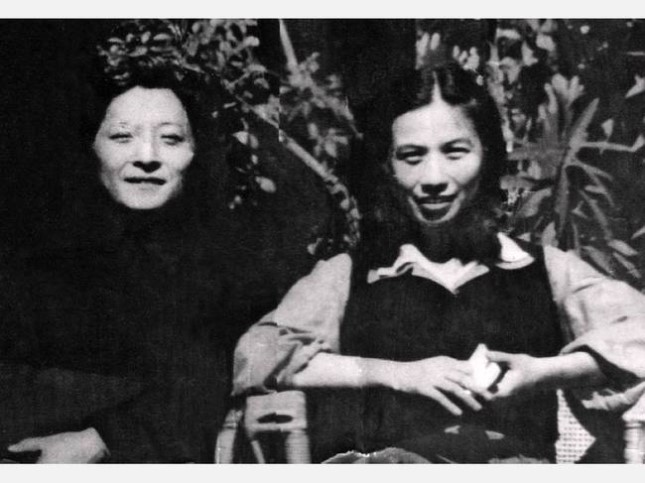
Sun (right) with her husband Jin Shan

Following the production of How Steel is Made, Sun Weishi began a romantic affair with Jin Shan, who had played the male lead, Pavel. The affair caused a controversy within CCP circles when it became public, since Jin was still married to actress Zhang Ruifang at the time. The two eventually married on 14 October 1950, after Jin divorced Zhang, a famous actress who played Pavel's lover in the play.

By the time that Sun and Jin met, Jin was already a famous film and theater actor, "the Clark Gable of the Shanghai stage". When he was young, Jin was adopted by the Shanghai gangster Du Yuesheng, and encouraged to join the CCP in order to facilitate collaboration between the CCP and the Green Gang. In the 1930s Jin became an agent of Zhou Enlai, and gathered information for the CCP. During the Second Sino-Japanese War Jin toured areas of China not controlled by the Japanese, staging patriotic anti-Japanese plays.

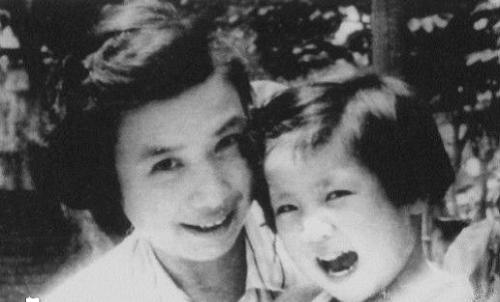
Sun with her daughter Sun Xiaolan

Sun and Jin were married on 14 October 1950 at the Beijing Youth Palace. Sun's wedding gift from Zhou Enlai and Deng Yingchao was a copy of the Marriage Law of the People's Republic of China. Jiang Qing gave her a pair of embroidered quilts.

Shortly after his marriage to Sun, Jin was sent to the camp of Kim Il Sung to stage a play for CCP soldiers serving in the Korean War. While in Kim's camp, Jin was accused of having an affair with one of Kim's female secretaries. When Kim discovered the affair he had the secretary shot, and turned Jin over to the commander of the Chinese forces, Peng Dehuai. Peng sent Jin back to Beijing with the recommendation that Jin be executed. In the end, Jin was briefly imprisoned and expelled from the CCP, but was saved from execution through the intervention of Sun and Zhou.

Sun and Jin had a daughter, Sun Xiaolan (孙小兰). She was one of the twin daughters of actress Duan Mulanxin. During the Second Sino-Japanese War, Sun Xiaolan was separated from her mother and, following the founding of People's Republic of China in 1949, she was adopted and raised by Sun Weishi and Jin Shan.

=== Late artistic career ===
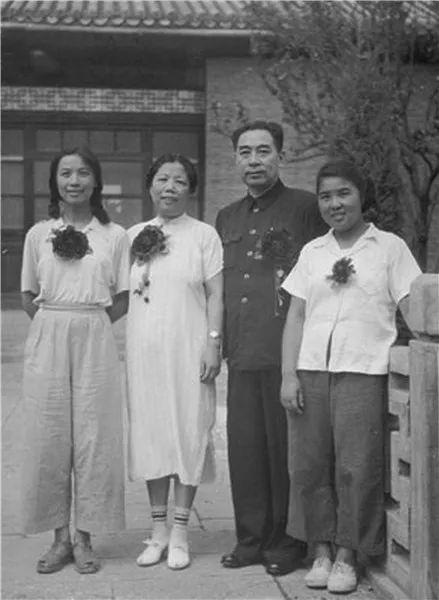
From left: Sun Weishi with Deng Yingchao, Zhou Enlai and her younger sister Sun Xingshi

In 1956 Sun became the artistic director and vice-president of the newly created Chinese Experimental Theater. While working with the Experimental Theater, Sun attempted to create a new style of socialist art by combining Stanislavsky's system with dramatic techniques found in traditional Chinese opera. In June 1956 Sun produced the play Joys and Sorrows, a drama about a romantic triangle between a CCP official and two women. The play was warmly received for its verisimilitude, portraying CCP officials as prone to the same weaknesses as other people. Because Joys and Sorrows focused on the personal life of a CCP leader, both it and Sun were criticized during the Anti-Rightist Movement of 1957, initiated by Mao in order to persecute those potentially critical of him.

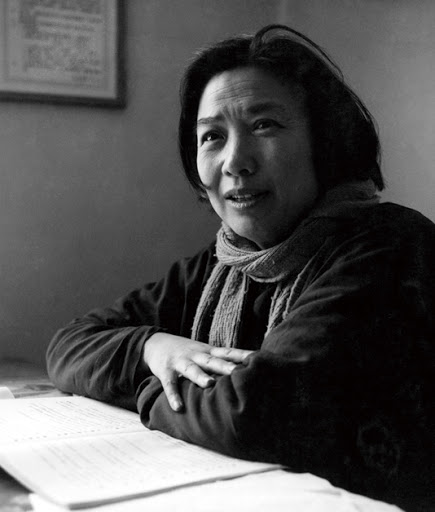
Sun Weishi (1964)

In 1957 Sun produced her second play for the Chinese Experimental Theater, Peach Flower Fan, a period play in which Sun utilized features of Chinese opera and folk dance. In 1957 Sun also produced a comedy, Portrait of One Hundred Clowns, in order to defend herself against her political critics by shallowly promoting the Anti-Rightist Movement.

In 1961 Sun produced a play based on the American novel Uncle Tom's Cabin, The Hatred of Black Slaves. In the Hatred of Black Slaves Sun experimented with techniques found in Chinese opera (the same which had inspired Brecht's concept of "alienation effects") in an effort to break down the "fourth wall". The Hatred of Black Slaves was notable for its attempts to expand the play's dramatic action beyond the confines of the stage.

In 1963, while directing the play "Azalea Mountain", Jiang Qing approached Sun and asked if she could be involved in the production of the play. Sun rejected Jiang's request, saying that, since the play was being produced by the Youth Theatre, it wouldn't be appropriate.

=== Daqing ===
After the success of the Hatred of Black Slaves, Zhou Enlai directed Sun to produce a play portraying the heroic deeds of oil workers at the Daqing oil field in northeast China. Sun and her husband, Jin Shan, moved to Daqing and worked for several years with oil workers and their wives.

After two years of living and working in Daqing, Sun returned to the Beijing theatre to produce the play The Rising Sun. The plot of The Rising Sun focused on the contributions that women made in agriculture and the construction of oilfields, and featured a cast made up exclusively of local people. The Rising Sun (1965) was the first time in the history of Chinese drama that experts and the public collaborated to create art. Due to the influence of the Cultural Revolution in China in the 1960s, Sun Weishi worked hard to understand and explore the theme of that particular social period and sought to show the unique spiritual outlook and relationship between people under dramatic social change. She pursued the significance of women and female rights in the context of turbulent social development, a vital element of her creation. The Rising Sun has the characteristics of political and gender representation, making the work not only reflect the distinctive features of her time but also enriching the public image of women. The play includes numerous female characters.

The play was well received in Daqing, Beijing, and Shandong. In Beijing, the production was performed over 180 times to audiences totaling in the tens of thousands. Encouraged by the play's success, Sun and Jin returned to Daqing in order to produce more plays based on oil workers, but were not able to complete their work before the advent of the Cultural Revolution in 1966. The Rising Sun was the last play that Sun would ever produce.

=== Political persecution and death ===
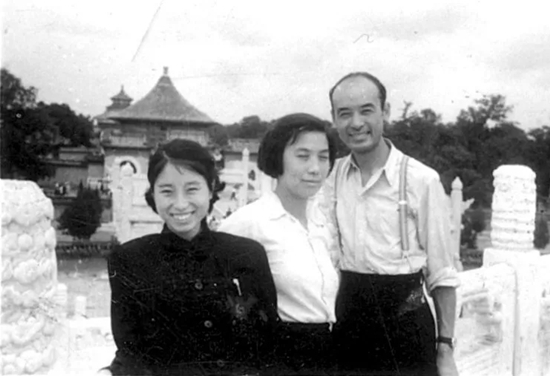
Sun Weishi (center) with her brother Sun Yang and sister-in-law (Qin Zhen). Both Sun and her brother were persecuted to death during the Cultural Revolution

When the Cultural Revolution began in 1966, Zhou Enlai's power became circumscribed, while Jiang Qing gained power. Although Zhou still held the formal position of premier, he was not able to prevent the arrest of Sun or even his own brother, and personally signed their arrest warrants in fear of angering Mao. After forcing Zhou to sign Sun's warrant, Jiang ordered officers from the Air Force (loyal to Lin Biao, Jiang's ally) to arrest and secretly imprison Sun, so that Zhou could not intervene to protect her.

Sun Weishi and Jin Shan were both imprisoned on 1 March 1968. After Sun's arrest Jiang confiscated and burned many of Sun's personal belongings, and arranged for Sun's name to be officially changed to "孙伪士" ("Sun, the Hypocrite", which sounds like "Sun Weishi"). Jiang gave orders that Sun be sentenced without trial, and directed that Sun be tortured at leisure, but not killed.

After being imprisoned, Sun Weishi was tortured for seven months, and eventually died in prison on 15 October 1968. Her body was found naked with her arms and legs still shackled. There were no female guards in the prison. Interviews with a guard a decade later implied that "higher-ups" had ordered her to be repeatedly raped. Two other prisoners gave an account of seeing the guards handing Sun over to several male convicts in the prison to be raped. These accounts match written or eyewitness accounts of other female prisoners who were tortured to death in the era, notably Zhang Zhixin and Lin Zhao.

After hearing of Sun's death and her condition at the time of her death, Zhou Enlai ordered an autopsy, but Jiang intervened and had Sun's body quickly cremated. After cremating Sun's body, Jiang had her ashes disposed of, in order to prevent Sun's family from taking possession of them.

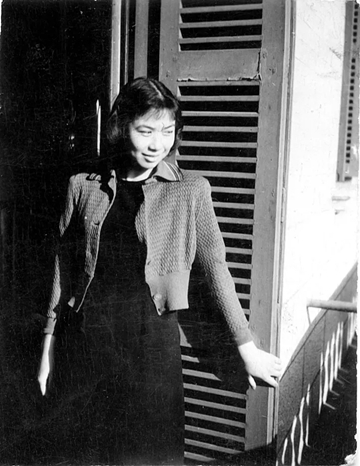
Sun Weishi

Jin remained in prison until his release in 1975, after the Cultural Revolution ended. Jin was not informed of Sun's death until after his release. After Jin's release, the Rising Sun was re-staged as part of a larger criticism of the Gang of Four, who many blamed for Sun's persecution and death. The occasion of the play's first staging after 1975 was reported as being particularly solemn.

Sun's daughter Sun Xiaolan was transferred to North China Oilfield to study nursing. Before that, she met her biological mother in Shanghai before her death few years later. After finishing school, Sun Xiaolan moved to Qixia, Nanjing, and worked as a nurse at a local Petroleum Pipeline Bureau hospital. She changed her name to 'Ouyang Shibing'. After working for a few years, she immigrated to Canada and settled there forever.

Following the end of Cultural Revolution, she was posthumously rehabilitated in June 1977. On 9 June 1977, a statue of Sun Weishi was placed in memory of her at the Babaoshan Revolutionary Cemetery in Beijing by the Art Bureau of the Ministry of Culture of the People's Republic of China. In 2012, on the 91st anniversary of her birth, Xinhua published a biographical book about her, Innocent Heart. The book consists of memories and articles of Sun Weishi, from her relatives, people and artists who collaborated with her.

On 26 December 2012, the National Theatre Company of China held a press conference regarding her biography, Innocent Heart, to memorize Sun Weishi and her 91st birthday. In the press conference the National Theatre Company stated that it considered Sun one of the three greatest directors in the history of People's Republic of China.
