= Jin Shan =

Chinese actor and director (1911–1982)

- 金山
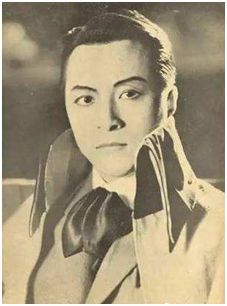
- Jin Shan in Song at Midnight (1937)
- Born: 9 August 1911; Suzhou, Jiangsu Province, Qing Empire
- Died: 7 July 1982 (aged 70)
- Occupations: Film director, actor, dramatist
- Years active: 1935–1982
- Spouses: Zhang Ruifang (m. 1942; div. 1950) Sun Weishi (m. 1950; died 1968) Sun Xingshi (1976–1982)
- Children: 1

Chinese name
- Simplified Chinese: 金山
Transcriptions
Standard Mandarin
- Hanyu Pinyin: Jīn Shān
- Wade–Giles: Jin^{1} Shan^{1}

Jin Shan (9 August 1911 – 7 July 1982), formerly known as Zhao Mo (Chinese: 赵默), was a Chinese drama and film actor, and director. He served as a member of the Chinese Federation of Literary and Art Circles, vice chairman of the Chinese Dramatists Association, and also a member of the Fifth National Committee of the Chinese People's Political Consultative Conference. He was known as the "Drama emperor".

== Early life ==
Jin Shan was born in 1911 in Suzhou. In 1918, he attended a private school for education and developed interest in opera and theatre, while attending an opera at Suzhou. Jin Shan later moved to Shanghai where continued his education at the Xuhui High School. In 1927, he was expelled from the school for offending the priest. Later, he served as a soldier in the Seventeenth Teaching Corps of the Kuomintang in Xiyuan Temple.

During this time, Jin was adopted by the Shanghai gangster Du Yuesheng, and encouraged to join the Chinese Communist Party in order to facilitate collaboration between the CCP and the Green Gang. In the 1930s Jin became an agent of Zhou Enlai, and gathered information for the Communists.

== Career ==
In the same year, he was transferred to the Chinese League of Left-wing Dramatists. In 1934, he became a member of the League of Shanghai Left-wing Cultural Bureau. From the following year, he and the dramatist Zhang Ming participated in the organization of the Shanghai Amateur Dramatists Association and the Forty Years Drama Club. In 1935, he and Zhao Dan founded the Shanghai Amateur Dramatists Association. On the same year, he starred in his first movie Crazy. During this time, he starred in other movies such as Eternal Regret, Imperial Envoy, Carnival Night and Sable Cicada.

In 1937, he co-starred with Hu Ping in the movie Song at Midnight, which is considered as the first Chinese horror film. After the outbreak of the Second Sino-Japanese War, he served as the deputy captain of the second team of Shanghai Salvation Drama and toured areas of China not controlled by the Japanese, staging patriotic anti-Japanese plays. He then worked in the Art Group of the Wuhan office of Eighth Route Army. In 1938, he established the Chinese National Salvation Troupe and served as its head. He and the troupe went to Southeast Asia for performances.

After the outbreak of the Pacific War, he returned to China and starred in the drama Qu Yuan in Chongqing in 1942. While playing in the drama, he fell in love with actress Zhang Ruifang and later got married with her in the same year. The two participate in various plays and appreciate each other.

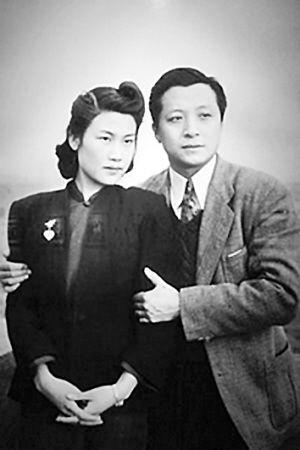
Jin Shan with his first wife Zhang Ruifang

Since then he participated in the formation of the Chinese Art Theatre and served as its director general. After the end of World War II, he went to the Northeast China to start the Manchuria Film and Television Association in 1946, and later wrote and directed the film On the Songhua River. After the founding of the People's Republic of China in 1949, Jin Shan was transferred to the China Youth Art Theatre as the vice president and chief director. He has starred in How Steel is Made, Uncle Vanya and other dramas, He also directed Beauty Walk and Princess Wencheng.

Following the production of How Steel is Made, Jin Shan, who had played the male lead, Pavel, had a romantic affair with director Sun Weishi, an adopted daughter of Premier Zhou Enlai. The affair caused a controversy within Communist circles when it became public, since Jin was still married to Zhang Ruifeng at the time. Eventually, Jin divorced Zhang, who played Pavel's lover in the play.

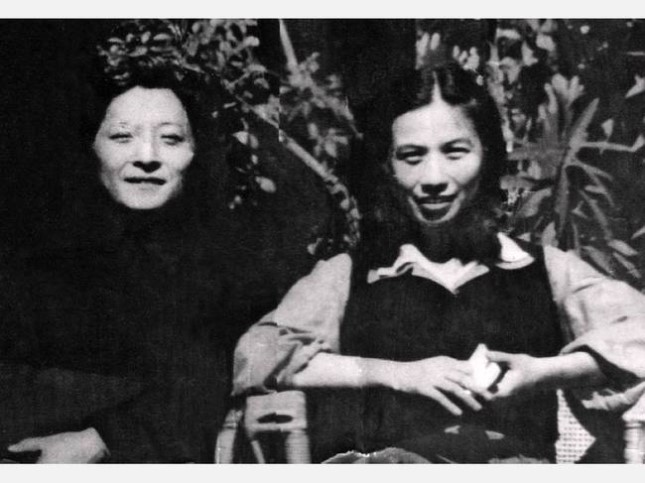
Jin Shan and Sun Weishi

Sun and Jin eventually married on 14 October 1950, at the Beijing Youth Palace. Shortly after his marriage to Sun, Jin was sent to the camp of Kim Il Sung to stage a play for Communist soldiers serving in the Korean War. While in Kim's camp, Jin was accused of having an affair with one of Kim's female secretaries. When Kim discovered the affair he had the secretary shot, and turned Jin over to the commander of the Chinese forces, Peng Dehuai. Peng sent Jin back to Beijing with the recommendation that Jin be executed. In the end, Jin was briefly imprisoned and expelled from the CCP, but was saved from execution through the intervention of Sun and Zhou.

Sun and Jin had an adopted daughter, Sun Xiaolan. She was one of the twin daughters of actress Duan Mulanxin. During the Second Sino-Japanese War, Sun Xiaolan was separated from her mother and, following the founding of People's Republic of China in 1949, she was adopted and raised by Sun Weishi and Jin Shan.

In 1956, directed the drama film Huanghualing. In 1958, he directed and adapted the sci-fi film Ballad of the Ming Tombs Reservoir, which was adapted from the play of the same name by Tian Han. In 1959, he directed and acted in the revolutionary film Storm.

In 1961, Jin and his wife Sun moved to Daqing and worked for several years with oil workers and their wives, eventually producing The Rising Sun, a play portraying the heroic deeds of oil workers in Northeast China. The play was well received in Daqing, Beijing, and Shandong. Encouraged by the play's success, Sun and Jin returned to Daqing in order to produce more plays based on oil workers, but were not able to complete their work before the advent of the Cultural Revolution in 1966.

== Later life ==
Following the start of Cultural Revolution in 1966, Jin Shan and Sun Weishi were both imprisoned on 1 March 1968, under the orders of Mao Zedong's wife Jiang Qing. Jin was persecuted and imprisoned for seven years. During this time, his wife Sun was tortured in prison for seven months, and eventually she died in prison on 15 October 1968.

Jin remained in prison until his release in 1975, after the Cultural Revolution ended. Jin was not informed of Sun's death until after his release. After Jin's release, the Rising Sun was re-staged as part of a larger criticism of the Gang of Four, who many blamed for Sun's persecution and death. In 1976, he remarried to Sun Xingshi, the younger sister of Sun Weishi.

In 1978, he became the dean of the Central Academy of Drama. In 1982, he served concurrently as the director of the TV Drama Art Committee. On 7 July 1982, Jin Shan died of cerebral hemorrhage at the age of 70.

In 2005, he was included in the list "Top Actors of 100 Years of Chinese Cinema".
