= Daqing Inaugural Oil Well =

Oil well in China drilled in 1958

The Songji Three Oil Well, also known as The Daqing Inaugural Oil Well, is situated adjacent to Yongyue Village, Gaotaizi Town, Datong District, Daqing City, Heilongjiang Province. The well was drilled on April 11, 1958, and oil production commenced on September 26 of that year. The finding of the well marked the start of the Daqing institution. In April 1988, the well casing sustained a significant fracture that was irreparable, leading to the official cessation of production on July 25th of that year. In 2001, the well was included in Major cultural heritage sites under national-level protection.

== Investigation ==
Since 1958, the Ministry of Geology and Mineral Resources and the Ministry of Petroleum Industry have coordinated personnel to drill the Songji one and Songji two wells in the Songliao Basin. Neither well exhibited industrial oil flow. In February 1959, following the organization of materials and an evaluation of exploration findings, the Ministry of Petroleum Industry determined a significant likelihood of oil presence in the Songliao Basin and proceeded to implement a new exploration program.

Following the analysis and evaluation, the research team resolved to drill the third wells in the Gaotaizi region of Songji. The reason for the change of address encompassed the well's distance exceeding 90 kilometers from both the Songji One and Songji Two Wells, its positioning on the comparatively thin sedimentary strata of the Datong Town Electrofacial Rise, the relative convenience of transportation, and the ease of assessing the oil-bearing potential in the vicinity of Gautaizi, among other factors. On September 3, 1958, the members of the Comprehensive Geological Research Team from the Songliao Petroleum Exploration Bureau, along with the Northeast Petroleum Survey Team of the Ministry of Geology, were invited to partake in the exploration of the Songliao Basin. The Northeast Petroleum Census Brigade of the Ministry of Geology, conducted a technical demonstration about the positioning of the third Songji well. On the 15th of the same month, the Songliao Petroleum Exploration Bureau submitted the well site proposal for the Songji Three Well to the Ministry of Petroleum Industry. The pertinent personnel gathered seismic profiles in the vicinity of Gaotaizi town to inform the drilling and enhanced the drilling foundation accordingly. In October, Zhong Qiquan and other people performed field surveys in the Gaotaizi region and slightly adjusted the final well position. On November 14, the Songliao Petroleum Exploration Bureau submitted the well site to the Ministry of Petroleum Industry, which approved it on the 29th of same month.

== Extraction ==
In late March 1959, the Songliao Petroleum Exploration Bureau 32118 drilling team completed the drilling of the Songji One Well and subsequently commenced construction of the Songji Three Well on April 11, with a designated depth of 3,200 meters. The harvest rate was just 49.2% during the well section coring due to inexperience; nonetheless, the drill core identified oil sands at 6 distinct depths. At this moment, Kang Shien, the vice minister of the Ministry of Petroleum Industry, recognized that the well exhibited a 5.7° inclination, which would significantly impede its progress. Consequently, he contemplated halting the drilling; however, this decision faced opposition from the Soviet Union experts within the Ministry of Petroleum Industry. Kang Shien sent the pertinent information to higher authorities, and upon receiving backing, he promptly ceased drilling and started oil testing. On July 20, the Songji three well was finalized at a depth of 1,461.76 meters, and on August 29, the well was finished, prompting the original rig to commence oil testing. On September 6, the Songji Three Well was test-fired in three of the six previously identified thin oil layers, which had a cumulative thickness of 1.7 meters. Each layer was refilled with 2 meters of oil at both the top and bottom; nevertheless, no oil was produced. Following the descent of the oil pipe, the introduction of pure water, and the removal of muck from the wellbore, oil remained absent. The Ministry of Petroleum Industry and the Petroleum Research Institute coordinated with Zhao Shengzhen and other technical personnel at the oil testing site, and mobilized resources to extract water from the well. On 8 September, at a depth of 300 meters from the bottom of the well, oil was observed as the water level continued to decline, resulting in an increase in the quantity of oil. A total of 113 cubic meters of crude oil and 52 cubic meters of water were recovered after several days of salvage operations. Following the application of pressure in the lower oil pipe, oil started to erupt out on September 26, with daily crude oil output potentially reaching 13.02 tons following testing. Between October 1959 and February 1960, following extensive test mining, the mining personnel demonstrated that the well could sustain long-term consistent output. In April 1988, the Songji Three Well tube casing exhibited several irreparable cracks. On July 25, the well was officially shut off. At this point, the well had yielded a cumulative total of 10,100 tons of crude oil.

== Remembrance ==
On October 1, 1959, Wang Shun, a prominent driller from the 32118 drilling crew, conveyed the joyous announcement of the oil field discovery to national officials on the Tiananmen. On October 12, the Heilongjiang Provincial Party Committee convened a Standing Committee meeting to commemorate the success of the Songji Three Well in oil production, subsequently renaming Datong Town in Zhaozhou County to Daqing Town, and altering the name of Datong People's Commune to Daqing People's Commune two days later. On November 8, five People's Communes named Daqing, Xinzhu, Daguan, Zhongxin, and Qunzhong were combined as Daqing District. Subsequently, the Ministry of Petroleum Industry and several ministries engaged in oil exploration in the region, ultimately establishing the Daqing oil field.
