= Eternity (1943 film) =

1943 film by Bu Wancang

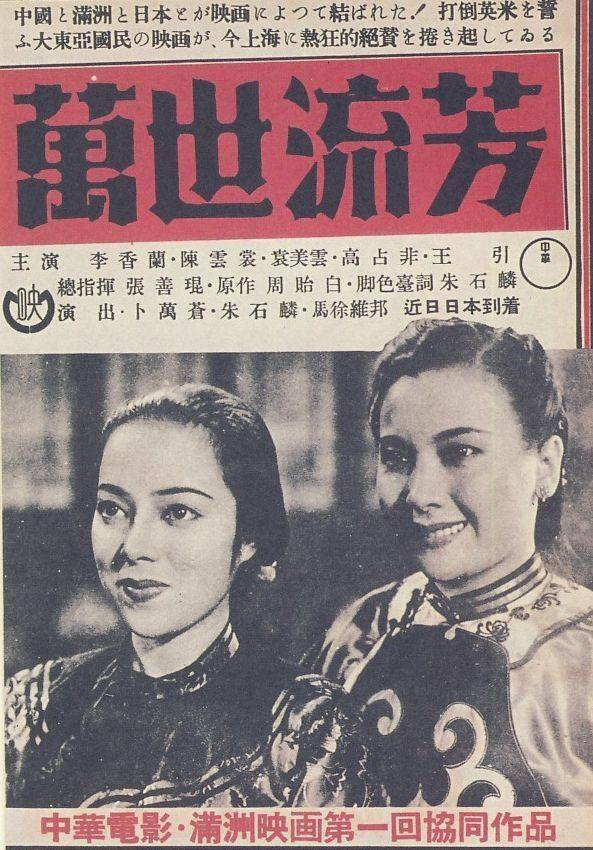
- Poster of the movie
- Directed by: Bu Wancang; Ma-Xu Weibang; Zhu Shilin; Yang Xiao-zhong; Zhang Shankun
- Written by: Zhou Yibai; Zhu Shilin
- Starring: Chen Yunshang; Li Xianglan; Gao Zhanfei; Yuan Meiyun; Wang Yin
- Cinematography: Yu Xingsan; Zhou Daming
- Music by: Chen Gexin; Huang Yijun
- Release dates: June 1, 1943 (China); January 2, 1944 (Japan)
- Running time: 151 minutes
- Countries: China (occupied); Empire of Japan
- Language: Mandarin Chinese

Eternity
- Traditional Chinese: 萬世流芳
- Simplified Chinese: 万世流芳
Transcriptions
Standard Mandarin
- Hanyu Pinyin: Wànshì Liúfāng
- Wade–Giles: Wan4-shih4 Liu2-fang1

Eternity (Chinese: 萬世流芳; pinyin: Wànshì Liúfāng) is a controversial 1943 Chinese film made in Japanese-occupied Shanghai during the Second World War. The film was a collaborative effort between the Japanese-controlled Manchukuo Film Association and Chinese filmmakers that remained in Shanghai under the Japanese-controlled Zhonglian Productions ("United China") brand.

Telling the story of Lin Zexu and the First Opium War, the film was designed by producers Kawakita Nagamasa and Zhang Shankun to offer "an interpretive fluidity to accommodate every spectator's ideological position." For Japanese audiences, the film could be read as anti-Western, as promoting the ostensibly "anti-colonialist" agenda of the Greater East Asian Co-Prosperity Sphere. To Chinese audiences, on the other hand, the film promoted a spirit of resistance to a foreign enemy – namely, Japan – and upon its release garnered the largest audience in Chinese cinematic history. Ultimately the film, as well as the Shanghai-based filmmakers, were seen as tools of the Japanese once the war was over, with many involved in the production (notably directors Bu Wancang, Ma-Xu Weibang, and Zhu Shilin) eventually moving to Hong Kong due to the hostile environment.

== Cast ==
- Chen Yunshang as Zhang Jingxian
- Li Xianglan (Japanese name Yamaguchi Yoshiko)
- Gao Zhanfei as Lin Zexu
- Yuan Meiyun
- Wang Yin

== Production history ==
In 1939, the Japanese had formed the China Movie Company ("Zhongdian") to make Japanese propaganda shorts. By 1941, Zhongdian signed a deal with the head of the Xinhua Film Company, Zhang Shankun, followed quickly by two other deals with the Yihua Film Company and the Guohua Film Company.

=== Casting ===
The film was cast primarily with Chinese actors out of (what remained) of the Shanghai studio system (now under the control of Zhonglian). One major star cast, however, was the Manchuria-born Japanese actress Yoshiko Yamaguchi. Though she had already starred in several Chinese features under her Chinese name of Li Xianglan, Yamaguchi was a seeming outlier in the cast of Eternity. She was, therefore, an indication of the control the Japanese exercised over the Chinese film industry in Shanghai. Helped by the massive pop hits "Candy-Peddling Song" (賣糖歌) and "Quitting (opium) Song" (戒煙歌), the film would catapult Li into stardom, as her earlier works had been in films so blatantly pro-Japanese, as to turn off most of the Chinese audience.
