= Xiyuan Temple =

Buddhist temple in Suzhou, Jiangsu, China

- 西园寺
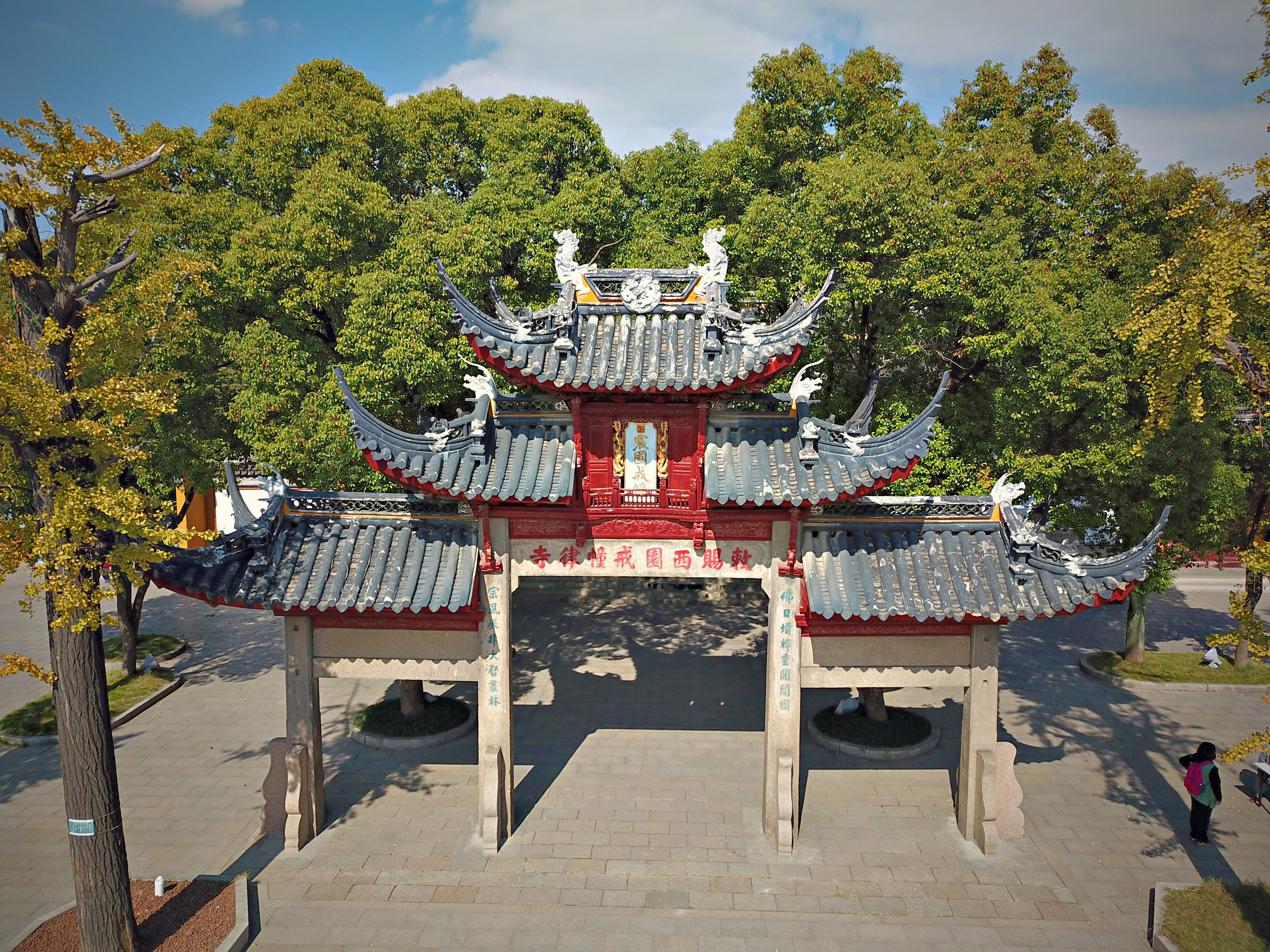
- Shanmen

- Location within Jiangsu

Religion
- Affiliation: Buddhism
- Sect: Chan Buddhism

Location
- Location: Wuzhong District, Suzhou, Jiangsu, China
- Interactive map of Xiyuan Temple
- Coordinates: 31°19′00″N 120°35′01″E

Architecture
- Style: Chinese architecture
- Established: Yuan dynasty
- Completed: 1875 (reconstruction)

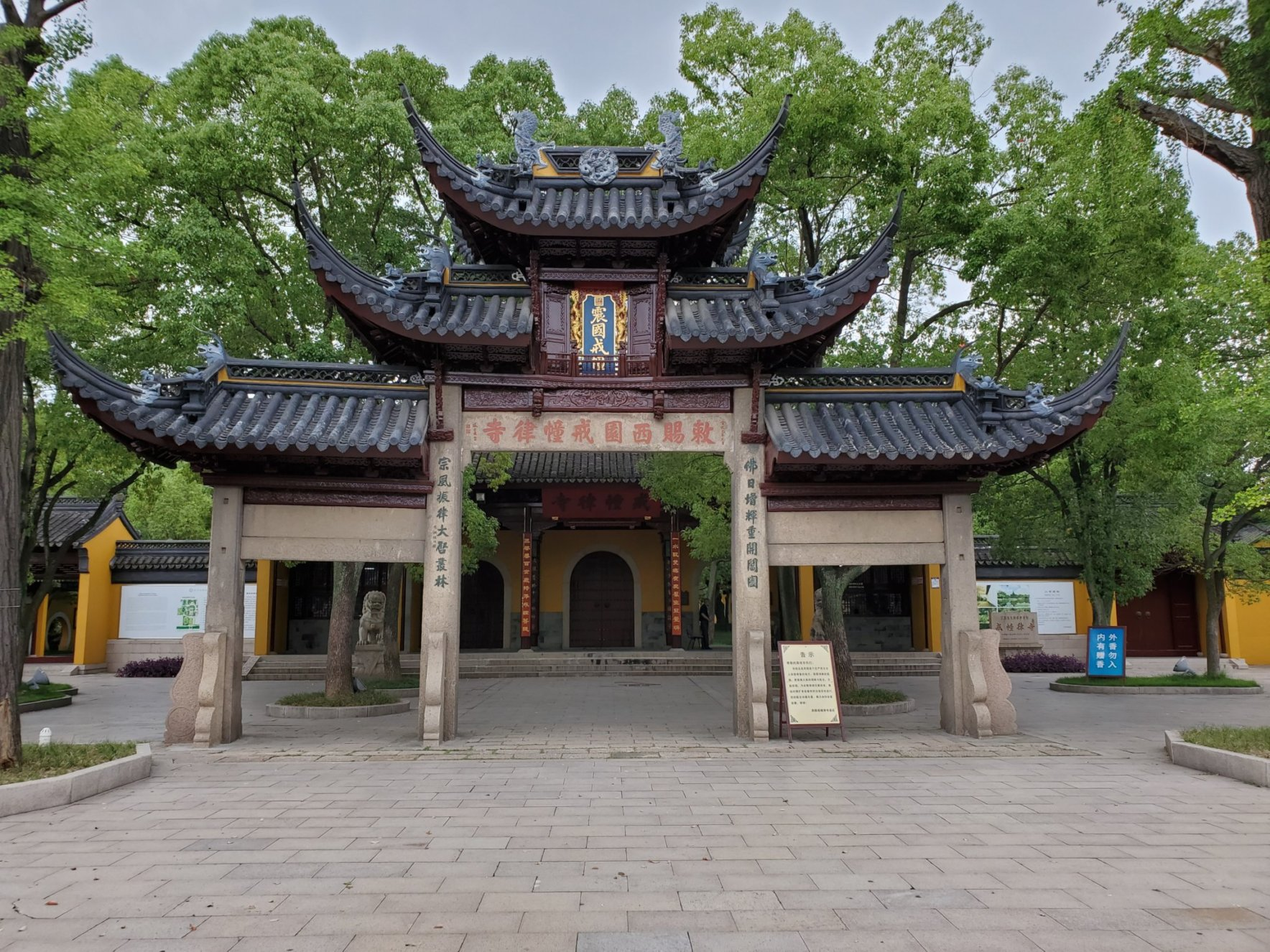
Xiyuan Temple Front Entrance

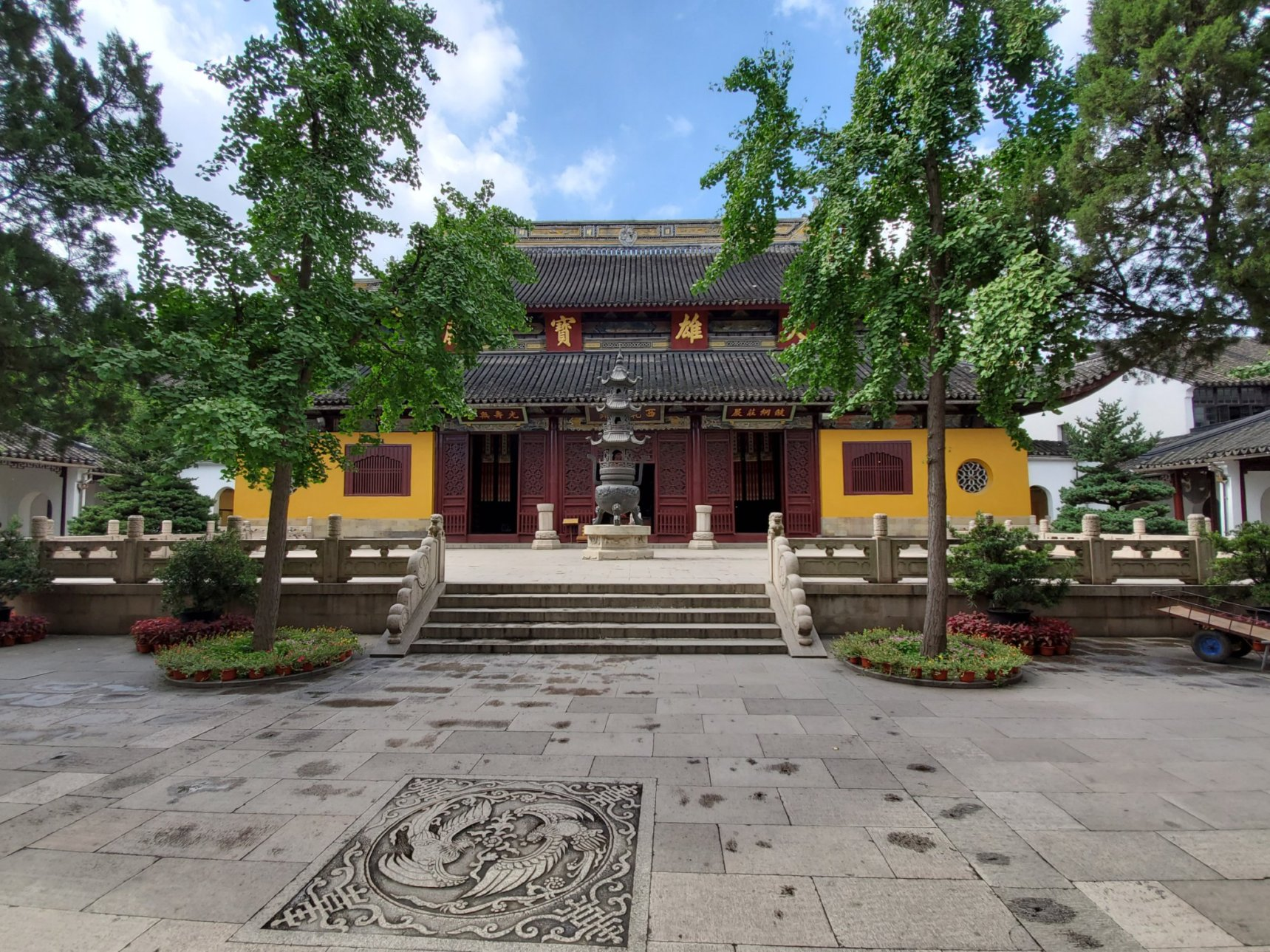
Xiyuan Temple Interior Plaza

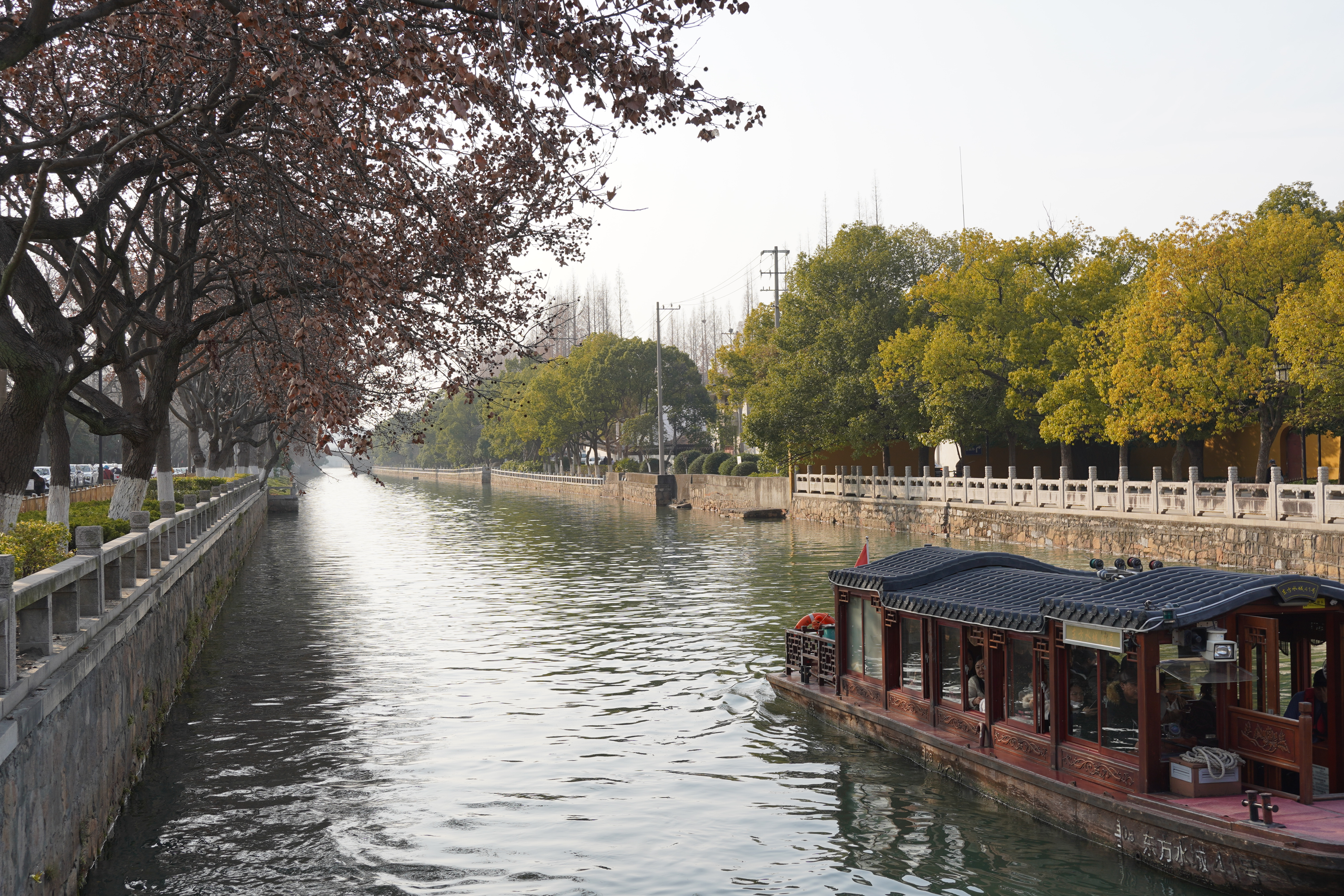
Shantang river, at the entrance of Xiyuan Temple

Xiyuan Temple (Chinese: 西园寺; pinyin: Xīyuán Sì) or Xiyuan Jiechuanglü Temple (Chinese: 西园戒幢律寺; pinyin: Xīyuán Jièchuánglǜ Sì) is a Buddhist temple in Wuzhong District, Suzhou, Jiangsu, China. It is located just to the west of Lingering Garden.

== History ==
The temple was founded in the Yuan dynasty, was destroyed and then became part of a large classical garden, Xiyuan or West Garden (Chinese: 西园). The garden belonged to a Senior Government Official during the Ming Dynasty. When he died, his son donated the garden to the monastery. Most of the buildings were destroyed during the Taiping Rebellion in 1860. It was rebuilt after the war.

The temple is known for its statues, Arhat Hall and Free Life Pond, where 2 famous long-life Asian Giant Softshell Turtles lived. One turtle died in 2007 at the age of 400, and the other has disappeared.

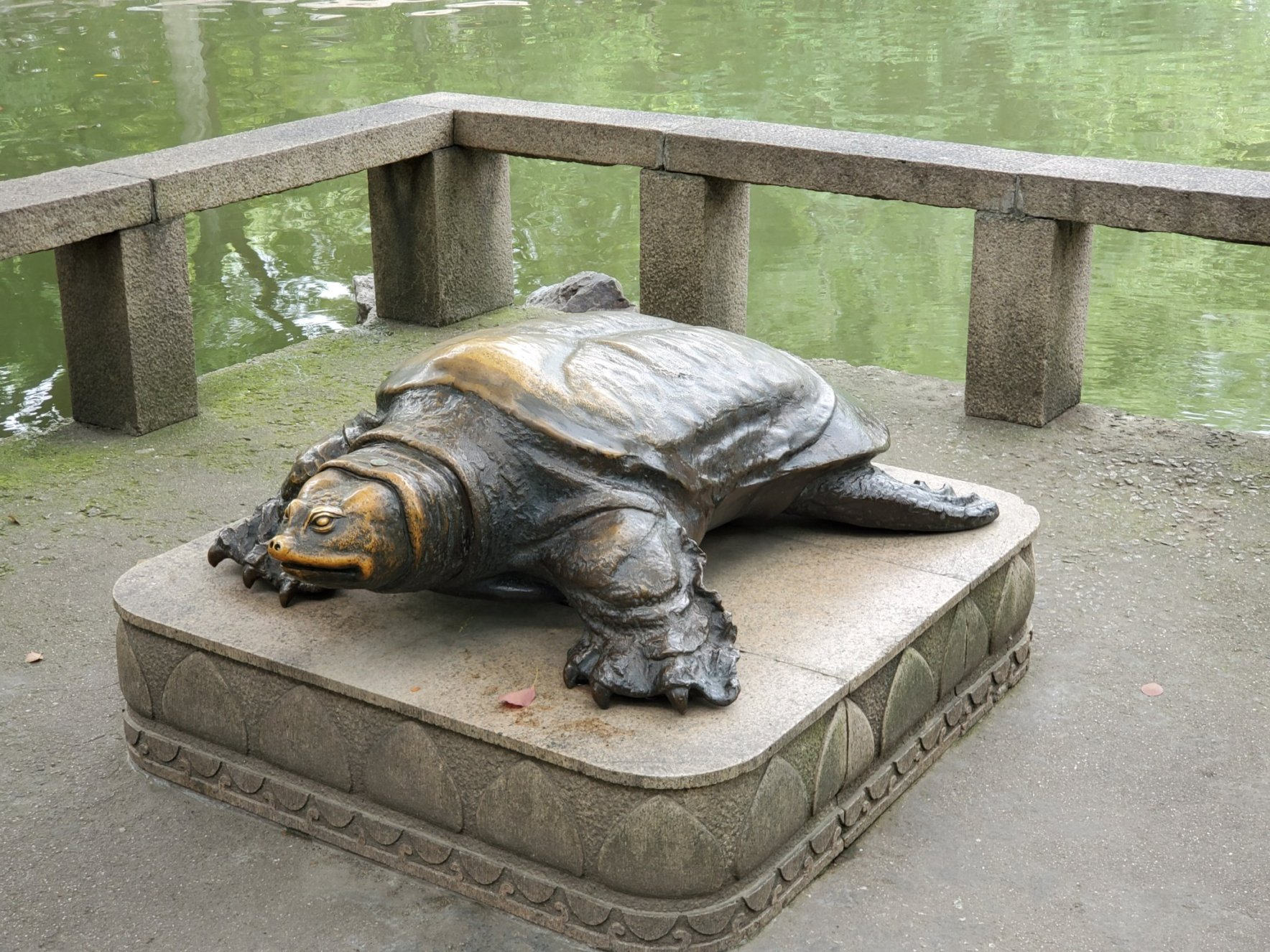
Asian Giant Soft shell Turtle Statue

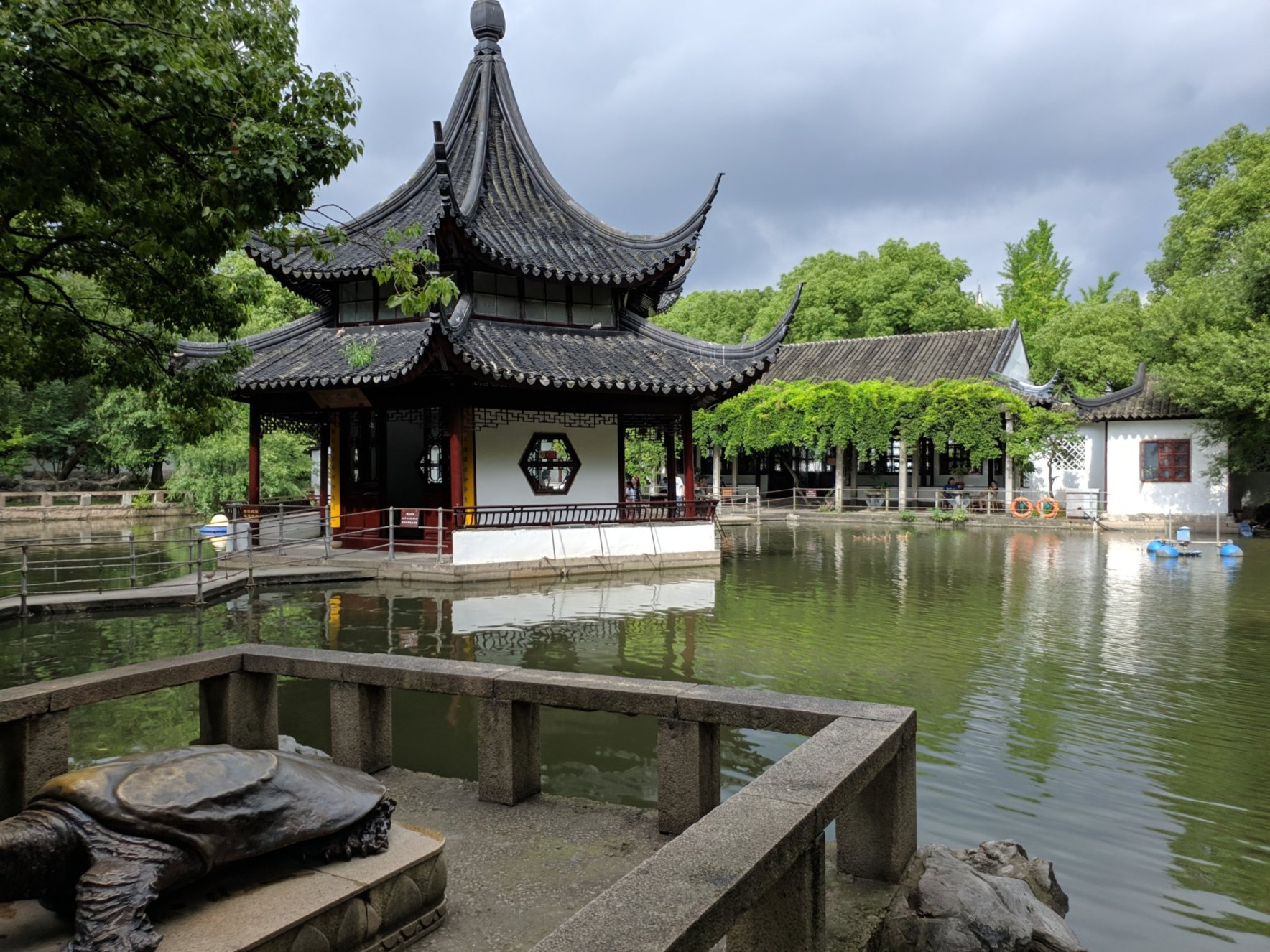
Free Life Pond

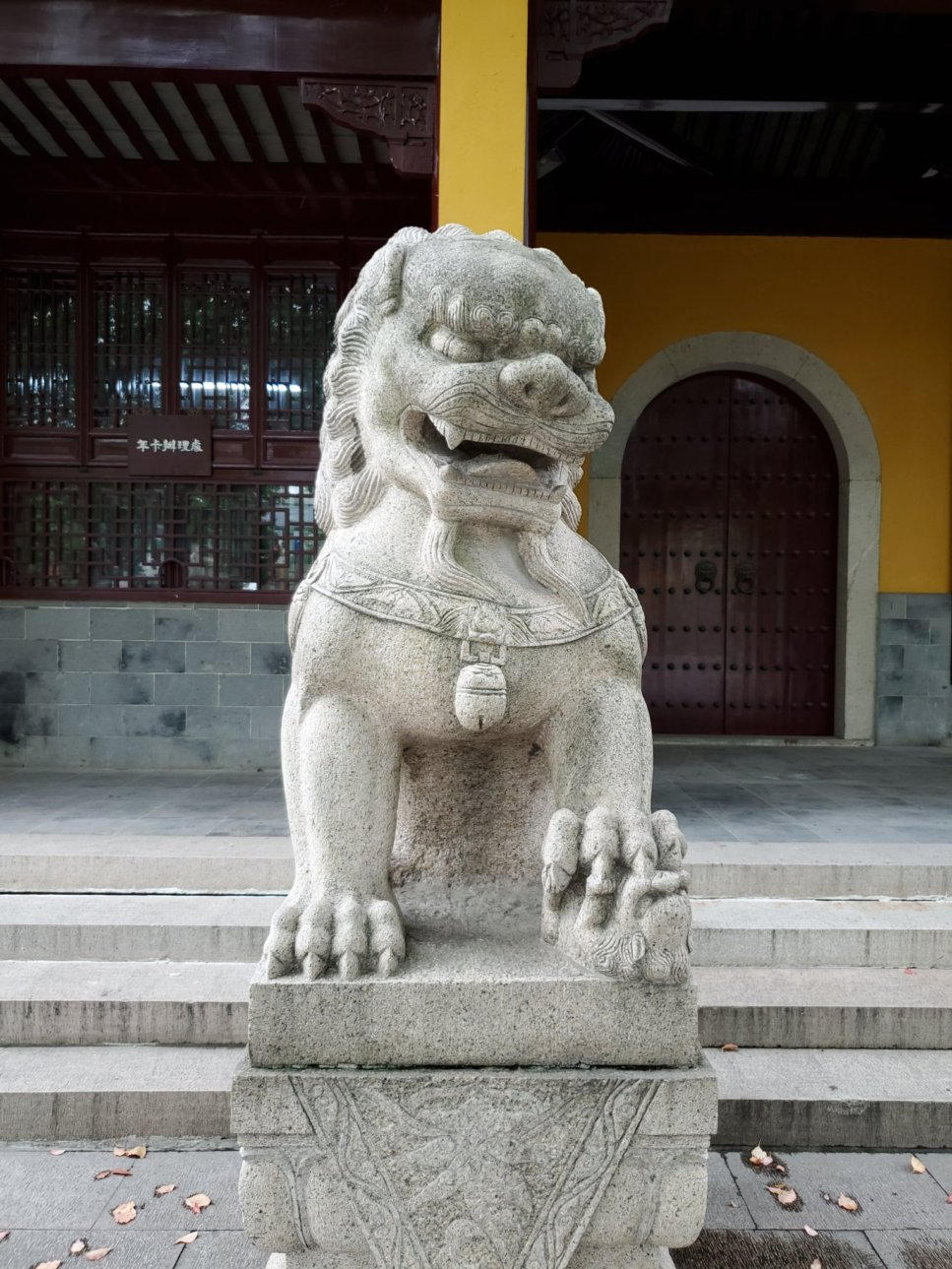
Guardian Lion Statue
