= Changqing oil field =

Oil field in Inner Mongolia

Changqin
- Country: China
- Region: Inner Mongolia
- Offshore/onshore: onshore
- Operator: China National Petroleum Corporation

Field history
- Discovery: 1971
- Start of production: 1975

Production
- Current production of oil: 472,000 barrels per day (~2.35×10^{7} t/a)
- Current production of gas: 110×10^{6} m^{3}/d 3.9×10^{9} cu ft/d
- Estimated oil in place: 3400 million tonnes (~ 1.18×10^{9} m^{3} or 7450 million bbl)
- Estimated gas in place: 1,000×10^{9} m^{3} 35×10^{12} cu ft

The Changqing oil field is an oil field located in Inner Mongolia. It was discovered in 1971 and developed by China National Petroleum Corporation. It began production in 1975 and produces oil and natural gas. The total proven reserves of the Changqing oil field are around 23.8 billion barrels (3.4 billion tonnes), and production is centered on 472,000 barrels per day (75,000 m^{3}/d).

Changqing is the largest oil and gas field in China.

== History ==
In 2015, the CNPC announced the discovery of 100 million metric tons of tight oil geological reserves in the Changqing field (733 million barrels of oil). It was the largest discovery of tight oil in the history of China.

In 2020, it passed the 60 million ton mark in annual production (24.52 million tons of crude oil output). 50 cities in China rely on this oil field. By 2020, Changqing had also produced a total of 468.6 billion cubic meters of natural gas. In 2013, Changqing had passed the 50 million mark in annual production (23.58 million tons of crude oil).

== Controversies ==
In October 2020, 20 employees were arrested for stealing oil from the field.

In March 2021, the chief coordinator and head of production of Changqing oil field placed under investigation for receiving millions of yuan in bribe money.
