= Song at Midnight =

1937 Chinese film

- Promotional release poster
- Directed by: Ma-Xu Weibang
- Written by: Ma-Xu Weibang
- Based on: The Phantom of the Opera by Gaston Leroux
- Produced by: Zhang Shankun
- Starring: Jin Shan; Gu Menghe; Zhou Wenzhu; Hu Ping
- Cinematography: Yu Xingsan; Xue Boqing
- Edited by: Chen Yiqing
- Music by: Tian Han; Xian Xinghai
- Production company: Xinhua Film Company
- Release date: 1937
- Running time: 113 minutes
- Country: Republic of China
- Language: Mandarin Chinese

Song at Midnight (simplified Chinese: 夜半歌声; traditional Chinese: 夜半歌聲; pinyin: Yèbàn gēshēng, also known as Midnight Song, Singing at Midnight or literally "Midnight Voice") is a 1937 Chinese film directed by Ma-Xu Weibang, a director best known for his work in the horror genre. Often referred to as the first Chinese horror film, or as the first horror-musical, Song at Midnight draws influence from the 1923 film The Hunchback of Notre Dame, as well as the 1910 novel The Phantom of the Opera (Le Fantôme de l'Opéra) by Gaston Leroux and its 1925 film adaptation of the same name.

Song at Midnight was released five months prior to the eruption of the Second Sino-Japanese War in China. The film's primary subplot concerns the activities of Chinese leftist revolutionaries, and did not easily evade the film censorship of Kuomintang, along with its serious punishment to films dealing with themes of horror, gods, spirits, or "superstition and heresy" at that time. With a passion to maintain his creation, and in order to successfully circumvent the censorship laws in China at the time, director Ma-Xu Weibang visited "Yiyong jun jinxing gu" (March of the Volunteers) writer Tian Han several times while writing the script. The pair met to ensure that the script would be approved under censorship.

== Plot ==
One dark and stormy night in 1926, a group of itinerant actors—known as the Angel Theatre Troupe—arrive at an abandoned theatre slated for demolition, which the troupe has rented to put on a play. While initially daunted by the ghastly and unkempt nature of the building, the actors set about rehearsing for their show. One night, the play's lead, Sun Xiao’ou, has trouble with the lines for the play's titular number, "Romance of the Yellow River," and requests to be alone in the theatre. As he continues to rehearse, a mysterious and disembodied voice begins to sing the lines along with Xiao’ou, effectively teaching him the part. Upon inquiring with the theatre's haggard caretaker, Xiao’ou learns that the voice belongs to a once famous actor long thought to be deceased - Song Danping. The voice of Danping teaches Xiao’ou the song, and the play is a great success. After the show, the young Xiao’ou hopes to thank Danping for his help, and follows his voice to a room atop the theatre, where Danping sits in a baggy robe and large hood. After some prodding, Xiao’ou convinces Danping to tell his story.

In flashbacks, Danping reveals that prior to his acclaim as a theatre actor, he was a revolutionary fighter in the Second Chinese Revolution, after which he was forced to go into hiding and develop a new identity. While living as Danping, the clandestine revolutionary fell in love with Li Xiaoxia, whose father did not approve of the couple. At the encouragement of Danping's rival Tang Jun, Danping was tortured and ultimately attacked with acid by Tang's accomplices. Although he survived the attack, Danping was horribly disfigured by the acid burns and became too embarrassed to show himself to Xiaoxia. Instead of facing her, Danping started a rumour of his death, which in turn drove Xiaoxia to the point of insanity.

Back in the present day, Danping explains that he now lives in the seclusion of the theatre attic, only coming out to sing every midnight, comforting a mentally unstable Xiaoxia with his song. Upon hearing Danping's tragic story, Xiao’ou agrees to help comfort the distressed Xiaoxia, whose condition improves markedly after meeting Xiao’ou, who poses as Danping.

As a parallel to Danping's resurrection through Xiao’ou in the eyes of Xiaoxia, the Angel Theatre Trouple puts on a production of Danping's old play, Hot Blooded, with Xiao’ou playing Danping's lead part. He does so with great success, as many people flock to the theatre to see the play. Unfortunately for the protagonists, one of the people in attendance is Tang Jun, Danping's old rival and now owner of the theatre. He takes a liking to the girlfriend of Xiao’ou, fellow actress Lu Die, which leads to Tang Jun accosting Die in her dressing room. As Tang tries to force himself on Die, Xiao’ou arrives and pulls Tang away from her. Tang aims his pistol at Xiao’ou, but in order to protect her boyfriend, Die jumps in front of the shot, and is killed.

It is at this precise moment that Danping, hearing the gunshot, comes out of hiding to finally face Tang. The pair fight their way to the top of the tower while Xiao’ou does his best to unsuccessfully calm the rising anger of the audience, the excited theatregoers quickly becoming an angry, torch-wielding mob. Upstairs, Danping concludes his fight with Tang, as Danping kills his rival by throwing him out of a window. The mob sets its sights on Danping, who they assume to be a monster, due to his ghastly appearance.

The mob chases Danping to a different abandoned tower, as Xiao’ou goes to Xiaoxia. Cornered in the burning building, Danping jumps to his death in the river. At this very moment, Xiaoxia regains her sanity. The film closes with Xiao’ou promising to fight to achieve Danping's ideals, finally showing both him and Xiaoxia standing together, greeting the sunrise, while a recording of Danping's "Song at Midnight" plays.

== Cast ==
- Jin Shan as Song Danping (an opera singer)
- Hu Ping as Li Xiaoxia (Song Danping's lover)
- Gu Menghe as Tang Jun (the thug)
- Shi Chao as Sun Xiao'ou (an opera singer)
- Xu Manli as Lv Die (Sun Xiaoo'u's lover)
- Wang Weiyi as Old Zhang (Old gatekeeper)
- Liu Shangwen as the leader of the opera troupe
- Zhou Wenzhu as the Nurse
- Chen Yun as Shu Fang
- Xiao Ying as Li Xianchen
- Li Junpan as Zhong Xiaotian
- Chen Baoqi as Troupe Director
- Wang Yingying as Mrs. Zhong
- Zong You as Inn Assistant 1
- Liang Xin as Inn Assistant 2
- Cai Juefei as Troupe Member

== Themes ==
Author Yiman Wang argues that Song at Midnight not only presents left-wing nationalist ideology indirectly, but also alludes to the war anxieties of Chinese citizens in the late 1930s. According to Wang, the phantom in the film was related to the traumatic history in Shanghai and Hong Kong, which was under colonial domination. Indeed, Yomi Braester notes that the unique narrative style of the film also makes it different from the "soft movie" entertainment more prevalent in the 1930s. Braester goes on to state that because of its "hard" characteristics, left-wing critics were able to promote Socialist Realism through this film, emphasizing cinema's mission to awaken the masses.

Director Ma-Xu Weibang was sensitive to the political anxiety among citizens, and used the genre of horror to implicitly express an intellectual thirst for political revolution, and discomfort with the status quo. Braester also posits that the plot is complicated by the theme of the scar. Danping is a talented opera singer whose face was turned into a horrifying cicatrix by Tang Jun's men, and as such, Danping's scar becomes the mark of the historic battle between feudal and revolutionary forces. Insofar as the facial deformity signals its bearer's sacrifice and the reality of his struggle, the scar is an icon of ideological virtue. Ironically, the scar also stands in counterpoint to the revolutionary message, because Danping is prevented from carrying out his mission due to the fact that he does not want to show his face in public, which could be read to be a veiled critique of film censors. Indeed, throughout the film, the scar threatens to become a sign of condemnation. Author Christopher Rea also notes the significance of Danping's voice itself as a controlling influence over the world of the film. For example, when Danping sings of rain and waves, the audience is shown images of these phenomena.

== Soundtrack ==
Song at Midnight was released at the advent of sound films in China, with sound-recording technology provided the film with auditory effects not found in silent films. The use of songs as a part of the soundtrack in the film make it stand out from other horror films. These songs both contribute to the frightening atmosphere of the story world and progress the plot. The three songs written by Tian Han and Xian Xinghai showcase the beauty of classic Chinese lyricism, and possess the fighting spirit of the Chinese people against the Japanese. For example, only Danping's silhouette is shown while he performs “Song at Midnight” at the beginning of the film, in order to establish a sense of ambiance and mystery, since it is sung by a figure that is unknown to the audience.

Film Soundtracks
Name	Written By	Producer	Appearance Time In-film
"Song At Midnight"《夜半歌声》	Tian Han 田汉	Xian Xinghai 冼星海	9 minutes
“Lovers of the Yellow River"《黄河之恋》	Tian Han 田汉	Xian Xinghai 冼星海	32 minutes
"Hot Blood"《热血》	Tian Han 田汉	Xian Xinghai 冼星海	71 minutes

== Release and reception ==
After the release in February 1937, Song at Midnight instantly became well known to almost every household in Shanghai and achieved a huge box office success. Author Yomi Braester states in his book Revolution and Revulsion that where Song at Midnight was screened, especially the major coastal cities, the usage of revolutionary representation gained followers because of the internal tension of the plots. The Dawanbao evening newspaper reviewed the film and warned that it was a mistake simply producing a horror film, however, the columnist, styled Ye Di, states there is nothing wrong in making horror films, but only as long as they encourage people to struggle and fight against their fate. The popularity of the film resulted from not only its content but also its advertising. The marketing for the film included an oversized coffin placed outside of a theater, a poster featuring the Phantom's face with light bulbs for eyes, and rumors that the aforementioned poster had scared a child to death. Subsequently, the film was advertised with the warning "Children under six years old are not admitted", further arousing the interest of audiences. Zhang Shankun, the producer, used this opportunity to spread the news which eventually became famous in Shanghai. It also held the record for domestic made films of 1936 in the box-office. With a strong publicity campaign, Song at Midnight created a public sensation at that time, and it was named as one of the best 100 Chinese films by both the Hong Kong Film Awards in 2005, and by Asia Weekly in 1999.

The film was the first sound adaptation of Gaston Leroux's The Phantom of the Opera in feature length form, and although not the most well-known interpretation of the novel, it is considered the most popular cinematic interpretation by film critics in the Chinese speaking world. Moreover, Song at Midnight reveals an uneasy dialectic between revolutionary message and horror imagery, as it was released in February 1937, on the eve of the Japanese invasion and during a heated drive for clear social messages in literature. According to Christopher Rea, in his book Chinese Film Classics 1922–1949, the film expresses a sense of dread about a country on the edge of war, as the film's mood of horror and trepidation combines with its political message.

== Western influence ==
Song at Midnight is not a typical Chinese horror story; it does not feature any of the iconographic characters from traditional Chinese horror fiction such as fox-spirits, ghostly maidens, Taoist priests, or itinerant scholars. Rather, many elements in Song at Midnight are considered to have been inspired by Western horror. For instance, the detailed expressionistic settings indicate that Ma-Xu has taken inspiration from American films such as Frankenstein. There is also a few similarities to the 1922 German Expressionist film Nosferatu. Furthermore, elements of popular Western and traditional Chinese opera were mixed by composer Nian Zinghair.

The ending of Song at Midnight is very similar to that of Frankenstein, wherein both movies, the "monster" is chased by the fiery mob into a structure and killed after the structure is set on fire. The Phantom in Song at Midnight also borrows the pathos in Frankenstein as a sympathetic monstrous figure. Similarly, according to David Robinson, Song at Midnight is deemed to be the Chinese version of The Phantom of the Opera (1925). He deems the film as a creative and fascinating interpretation of Leroux's tale. In both films, the phantom provides vocal tutoring to young actors preparing for a play. Both phantoms are also driven by passion. In The Phantom of the Opera, the phantom wants his protégée to be his eternal wife, and in Song at Midnight, Danping wants to use his protégé to get closer to his long lost love.

Writing for Paste Magazine, critic Jim Vorel notes that Song at Midnight "presages creative decisions" later present in the Universal Pictures' Phantom of the Opera (1943). The example he provides is the Phantom's disfigurement via acid attack.

== Home media ==
As part of their Chinese film retrospective, Cinema Epoch released Song at Midnight on Region 0 DVD on May 8, 2007. The DVD includes subtitles in English.

An earlier DVD edition by the Guangzhou Beauty Culture Communication Co. Ltd was released on December 1, 2006, in the United States.

== Sequel and remakes ==
A sequel to the original film was first released in 1941: Song at Midnight 2, continuing the story of Song Danping.

Song at Midnight and its 1942 sequel have also been remade several times in Hong Kong and mainland China. The first remake, also named Song at Midnight, was directed by Li Ying, and came out in 1956. The second remake, named The Mid-Nightmare, is a two-part series by Hong Kong director Yuan Qiufeng, released in 1962 (part I) and 1963 (part II). It starred Betty Loh Ti and Lao Zhei. The third remake, directed by PRC director Yang Yanjin, also called Song at Midnight, was made in 1985. The fourth remake, directed by Ronny Yu, was released in 1995, under of the title of The Phantom Lover. It was the most famous remake, starring pop singer Leslie Cheung in the lead role of Song Danping.

Song at Midnight remakes
Name	Director	Year
Song at Midnight	Li Ying	1956
Song at Midnight	Yuan Qiufeng	1962
Song at Midnight, Part II	Yuan Qiufeng	1963
Song at Midnight	Yang Yanjin	1985
The Phantom Lover	Ronny Yu	1995
Song at Midnight	Huang Lei	2005

There have also been other films and television series that were inspired by Ma-Xu's original Song at Midnight, such as Yang Gongliang's Wanli Xingshi (1954) and Guixia (1956), a Taiwan production called Gesheng Meiying (1970), and a 2005 television series by mainland director Huang Lei.

There have also been films inspired by Song at Midnight, such as Lu Shilei's Midnight Melody (2019), which borrows the original Chinese name 夜半歌声, and references the "First Chinese Horror Film" in its movie poster.
