= Sun Bingwen =

Chinese politician (1885–1927)

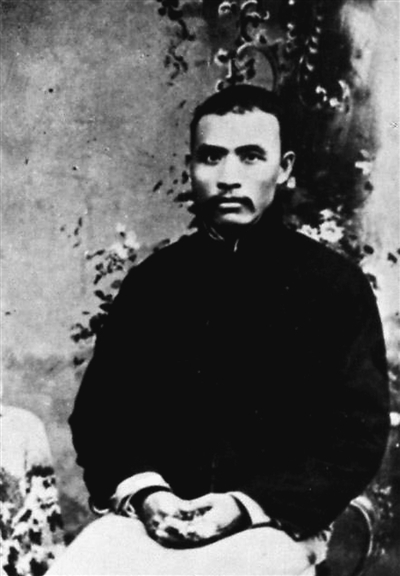
Sun Bingwen

Sun Bingwen (Chinese: 孫炳文; 1885–1927) was a Chinese Communist revolutionary who was executed by the Kuomintang during the Shanghai massacre.

== Biography ==
Sun Bingwen was born in a merchant family, the ninth of eleven children of his father Sun Buzhen. In 1908, he was admitted to the English class of the prep school of the Imperial University of Peking. Sun joined the Tongmenghui in 1911, and served as the editor-in-chief of the Republic of China Daily. After the Xinhai Revolution of 1911, he was admitted to Peking University. He met Zhu De in 1917, and served as chief of staff of a brigade. In September 1922, he and Zhu De went to study in Germany and in November of the same year, he joined the Chinese Communist Party in Berlin.

In April 1927, he became the General Affairs and Military Director of the Military Committee of the National Government. He was arrested and executed by the Kuomintang in Longhua, Shanghai during the Shanghai massacre of 1927. After his death, his daughter Sun Weishi was adopted by Zhou Enlai, later Premier of China.
