= Reflections of Murder =

- Title card
- Genre: Horror; Mystery; Thriller
- Based on: She Who Was No More (Celle qui n'était plus) by Pierre Boileau and Thomas Narcejac
- Written by: Carol Sobieski
- Directed by: John Badham
- Starring: Tuesday Weld; Joan Hackett; Sam Waterston
- Music by: Billy Goldenberg
- Country of origin: United States
- Original language: English

Production
- Producer: Aaron Rosenberg
- Cinematography: Mario Tosi
- Editor: David Rawlins
- Running time: 97 minutes
- Production companies: ABC Circle Films; Aaron Rosenberg/Charles Lederer Productions

Original release
- Network: ABC
- Release: November 24, 1974

Reflections of Murder is a 1974 made-for-TV movie that was produced by ABC. A suspense-horror mystery thriller film, it is a remake of the classic 1955 French film Les Diaboliques. John Badham directed, from Carol Sobieski's script. The cast was led by Tuesday Weld, Joan Hackett and Sam Waterston in the primary roles. Reflections of Murder was released to home video on the VHS format in the 1980s, but has not yet received an official DVD release.

== Plot ==
Claire Elliot is the abused wife of vicious schoolmaster Michael, who takes great delight in belittling and emotionally abusing her both in public and in private. Michael is also openly carrying on an affair with one of the school's teachers, Vicky, who he sometimes physically assaults. Having grown tired of his cruelty, the two women conspire to murder him and stage the act to look like an accident. But after committing the deed his body disappears, and the women begin to fear that someone might be trying to drive them mad.

== Cast ==
- Tuesday Weld as Vicky
- Joan Hackett as Claire Elliott
- Sam Waterston as Michael Elliott
- Lucille Benson as Mrs. Turner
- Michael Lerner as Jerry Steele
- Ed Bernard as Coroner
- R.G. Armstrong as Mr. Turner
- Lance Kerwin as Chip
- John Levin as Keith
- Jesse Vint as Cop on Freeway
- William Turner as Mr. Griffiths
- James A. Newcombe as Peter
- Sam Henriot as David
- Don Sparks as Photographer
- Sandra Coburn as Woman
- Rita Conde as Maid

== Remakes ==
Two more remakes followed. The first was House of Secrets, another made-for-TV adaptation that was broadcast in 1993, starring Melissa Gilbert, Bruce Boxleitner, Kate Vernon, and Cicely Tyson. In 1996 Warner Bros. released a theatrical reworking of the material under the title Diabolique, scripted by Don Roos, directed by Jeremiah Chechik, and starring Sharon Stone, Isabelle Adjani, Chazz Palminteri, and Kathy Bates.
