= Nicole Horner =

Nicole Horner may refer to a principal character in:

- Les Diaboliques, a 1955 French film known as Diabolique in the United States
- Diabolique, a 1996 American film that is a remake of the above
