= The Living and the Dead (Boileau-Narcejac novel) =

1954 French psychological mystery

- First english edition
- Author: Boileau-Narcejac
- Original title: D'entre les morts
- Translator: Geoffrey Sainsbury
- Language: French
- Genre: Mystery fiction Crime novel
- Publisher: Hutchinson
- Publication date: 1954
- Publication place: France
- English publication date: 1956
- Media type: Print (hardback)
- Pages: 192

The Living and the Dead (also known as Vertigo) is a 1954 psychological mystery novel by Boileau-Narcejac, originally published in French as D'entre les morts (lit. '"From Among the Dead"'). It served as the basis for Alfred Hitchcock's 1958 film Vertigo.

== Plot ==
In 1940, Parisian lawyer Roger Flavières is asked by his old friend Gevigne to help in a sensitive matter regarding his wife Madeleine. Gevigne claims that Madeleine has been acting strangely, but that doctors have been unable to find anything wrong with her. She seems to be possessed by the spirit of her great-grandmother, Pauline Lagerlac, who committed suicide when she was Madeleine’s present age. Gevigne is busy managing a shipbuilding business and he asks Flavières to watch over his wife for a while.

Flavières begins following Madeleine, and one day saves her after she jumps into the Seine. After the two become close, Madeleine tells Flavières that she feels she has lived before, and that she has a special connection to Pauline Lagerlac and the places she was associated with. One day Madeleine insists on going to a small town west of Paris and climbing an old church belltower. Flavières, unable to follow her to the top because of his fear of heights, witnesses her body falling to the ground. Unable to come near the body, he flees to Paris. Flavières does not tell Gevigne that he witnessed Madeleine’s death. Gevigne, distraught at being questioned by the police over the tragedy, tries to flee Paris but is killed in a German air raid.

A few years later, after the liberation of Paris, Flavières remains haunted by the memory of Madeleine. One day he sees a woman's face in a newsreel filmed in Marseille. Convinced that the woman was Madeleine, he travels there and tracks her down. Despite her initial denials that she is Madeleine, the woman, Renée Sourange, eventually confesses that she was Gevigne's mistress and conspired with him to get rid of his rich wife. Gevigne threw the real Madeleine from the top of the belltower so Flavières could witness it and confirm the suicide to the police, but Flavières's flight from the scene spoiled the plan. Upon the revelation that he never actually met the real Madeleine, Flavières strangles Renée then surrenders to the police.

== Background ==
François Truffaut in his book of interviews with Hitchcock popularized the idea that Boileau and Narcejac wrote The Living and the Dead specifically for Hitchcock. They heard that he was trying to purchase the rights to She Who Was No More but was outbid by Henri-Georges Clouzot and was jealous of the success of Les Diaboliques. However, in his interview with Dan Auiler, Narcejac denies it. He admits that their writing team shared certain affinities with the director but they never intended the novel to be specifically for him. According to Narcejac, the idea for the book came to him in a movie theater. He was watching a newsreel, and thought he recognized a friend with whom he had lost touch during the war. "After the war, there were many displaced people and families—it was common to have ‘lost’ a friend. I began thinking of possibilities of recognizing someone like this. Maybe someone who was thought dead...and this is where D'entre les morts began to take shape."

Narcejac also confirmed to Richard E. Goodkin that the Orpheus myth, where the hero tries to bring his beloved back from the dead, was another source of inspiration for the novel.

== Publication history ==
The novel was originally published in France as D’entre les morts in 1954. After the release of Hitchcock’s film adaptation in 1958, all subsequent French editions were retitled Sueurs froides ('Cold Sweat') to match the French release title of the film.

The novel was first published in English by Hutchinson as The Living and the Dead in 1956. It was republished by Dell as Vertigo in 1958. In 2015, Pushkin Vertigo republished it as Vertigo as well. All English editions use the same translation by Geoffrey Sainsbury.

== Critical reception ==
Upon its publication in English, the novel received generally positive reviews. Anthony Meredith Quinton in The Times Literary Supplement called it "a pure exercise in ingenuity of plot" but criticized the book's slow pacing: "When at length it comes the explanation is shocking and brilliant but not quite sufficiently so to justify the long trudge through the preliminary story." The Spectator wrote that Boileau-Narcejac "are currently conjuring up the most ingeniously mystifying plots—and convincing explanations—in the business; and all the more so for the poker-faced style," and called the novel "tantalising and quite irresistible like the living dead woman herself." In his New York Times review, Anthony Boucher was more critical—he felt that the writers tried to replicate the tricky plotting of their earlier She Who Was No More but met with "unfortunate results."

Since then the book has been largely overshadowed by Hitchcock’s film adaptation. Robin Wood commented: "The drab, willful pessimism of D’entre les morts is an essentially different world from the intense traffic sense of Vertigo, which derives from a simultaneous awareness of the immense value of human relationships and their inherent incapability of perfect realization." David Collard called the novel "a modestly competent psychological thriller" and added that "it's fair to say that it would attract little attention today had it not formed the basis of Alfred Hitchcock's Vertigo."

== Adaptations ==
=== Film ===
Vertigo (1958), US, directed by Alfred Hitchcock, and starring James Stewart and Kim Novak.

=== TV ===
La Présence des ombres (1996), Canadian-French TV film directed by Marc F. Voizard, and starring Patrice L’Écuyer.

=== Stage ===
Vertigo (1997), UK, adapted and directed by Sean O'Connor at Chester Gateway Theatre. In 1998, the play was produced at the Theatre Royal Windsor starring Martin Shaw as Flavieres and Jenny Seagrove as Madeleine. This production was subsequently revived at the Yvonne Arnaud Theatre, Guilford with Anthony Andrews as Flavieres.
