= She Who Was No More =

1952 novel by Boileau-Narcejac

- Original French-language cover
- Author: Boileau-Narcejac
- Original title: Celle qui n'était plus
- Translator: Geoffrey Sainsbury
- Language: French
- Genre: Mystery fiction Crime fiction
- Set in: France
- Published: 1952
- Publisher: Éditions Denoël
- Publication place: France
- English publication date: 1954
- Media type: Print
- Pages: 241

She Who Was No More is a psychological suspense novel by the writing team of Boileau-Narcejac, originally published in French as Celle qui n'était plus in 1952. The duo's first book, it is a thriller about a man who, along with his mistress, murders his wife. It served as the basis for Henri-Georges Clouzot's 1955 film Les Diaboliques.

The first French edition was published in 1952 by Éditions Denoël. It was originally published in English in 1954 under the title The Woman Who Was No More by Rinehart and as The Fiends by Arrow Books in 1957. The English version by Pushkin Press, under the title She Who Was No More, used the old translation by Geoffrey Sainsbury.

== Plot ==
Fernand Ravinel is a traveling salesman who leads a mundane existence with his wife, Mireille. His mistress, physician Lucienne, desires to open a practice in Antibes, so she and Fernand conspire to murder his spouse to collect on her life insurance policy of two million francs. They drown her in a bathtub, then make the death look like an accident, but things spiral out of control when her body disappears.

== Adaptations ==
=== Film ===
- The most notable adaptation is the 1955 French thriller Les Diaboliques. The film's director and co-screenwriter Henri-Georges Clouzot made several substantial changes to the plot. He switched the murderers to the wife and mistress and made the husband the victim, and invented the private school setting. He also followed the convention that the culprits should be exposed by the detective in the end (another departure from the novel, where the authors let them get away). According to legend, Clouzot beat Alfred Hitchcock to the film rights by mere hours. Les Diaboliques was a worldwide critical and box office success. (Hitchcock later directed Vertigo, which was based on another Boileau-Narcejac novel.)
- Krug obrechyonnykh (The Circle of the Doomed), (U.S.S.R., 1991), directed by Yuri Belenky, and starring Igor Bochkin, Anna Kamenkova, and Vsevolod Larionov
- Diabolique (U.S., 1996), directed by Jeremiah S. Chechik and starring Isabelle Adjani, Sharon Stone, and Chazz Palminteri was a remake of the 1955 film

=== TV ===
- Reflections of Murder (U.S., 1974), directed by John Badham, and starring Tuesday Weld, Joan Hackett and Sam Waterston
- Celle qui n'était plus (Switzerland, 1991), directed by Pierre Koralnik
- House of Secrets (U.S., 1993), directed by Mimi Leder, and starring Melissa Gilbert, Bruce Boxleitner, Kate Vernon, and Michael Boatman

=== Stage ===
- Monique (U.S., 1957), a drama in two acts, adapted by Dorothy and Michael Blankfort

== Reception ==
Rose Feld wrote in the New York Herald Tribune that the finale constitutes "an astounding turn that holds validity both for plot and characterization." Martin Levin in Saturday Review called it "an entirely new variation on the double-indemnity theme." Kirkus Reviews commented: "This nasty business is rather neat—over and above the negligible interest of those engaged in it." The editors of World Authors, 1950-1970 wrote: "The reader is so thoroughly drawn into the tale, so teased with faint subliminal hints and doubts, that the shatteringly unexpected conclusion is immediately and terrifyingly believable, in terms of both plot and character. One finishes the book with a sense of escaping from the horrible logic of a nightmare."

When the book was republished by Pushkin Vertigo in 2015, Barry Forshaw of Financial Times wrote: "Although She Who Was No More has been plundered so often it has lost some of its novelty, the book remains a supreme example of polished crime plotting."
