= Monique (play) =

1957 play

- Playbill cover for 1957 Broadway production
- Written by: Dorothy Blankfort; Michael Blankfort

Monique is a drama in two acts and six scenes by Dorothy and Michael Blankfort that is based on the novel She Who Was No More by Boileau-Narcejac. It premiered on October 10, 1957, at The Playhouse on Rodney Square in Wilmington, Delaware. It transferred to Broadway's John Golden Theatre where it opened on October 22, 1957. A murder mystery thriller, the play was produced and directed by Shepard Traube and starred Denholm Elliott as Fernand Ravinel and Patricia Jessel as Dr. Monique Rigaud. The costumes were designed by Helene Pons.
