= Braatz =

Braatz is a surname. Notable people with the surname include:

- Richard D. Braatz (born 1966), American academic
- Tom Braatz (1933–2018), American football player and executive
- Jason C. Braatz (born 1975), Entrepreneur, Owner of Rossi & Rovetti
