= Boileau-Narcejac =

Team of French writers

Boileau-Narcejac (French: [bwalo naʁsəʒak]) is the pen name used by the French crime-writing duo of Pierre Boileau (28 April 1906 – 16 January 1989) and Pierre Ayraud, also known as Thomas Narcejac (3 July 1908 – 7 June 1998). Their successful collaboration produced 43 novels, 100 short stories and 4 plays. They are credited with having helped to form an authentically French subgenre of crime fiction with the emphasis on local settings and mounting psychological suspense. They are noted for the ingenuity of their plots and the skillful evocation of the mood of disorientation and fear. Their works were adapted into numerous films, most notably, Les Diaboliques (1955), directed by Henri-Georges Clouzot, and Vertigo (1958), directed by Alfred Hitchcock.

== Biography ==
Pierre Louis Boileau was born on 28 April 1906 in Paris, the son of Léon and Maria Boileau (née Guillaud). His studies prepared him for a career in commerce, but he had been passionate about detective fiction since childhood. He changed several occupations while also contributing short stories and novellas to various newspapers and magazines. Then he wrote a series of novels about André Brunel, a dapper private detective specialized in difficult cases. Boileau's novel Le repos de Bacchus was awarded the prestigious Prix du Roman d'Aventures in 1938. He was drafted during World War II, taken prisoner in June 1940, and spent two years in a stalag, where he met Jean-Paul Sartre. Boileau was released from the camp due to his medical condition. He returned to Paris in 1942, and enlisted as a social worker for the Secours National, an organization helping the disadvantaged. His work involved visiting penal colonies and interviewing criminals. He resumed his writing career in 1945 with the novel L'Assassin vient les mains vides, and scripting a couple of successful radio series in 1945–1947.

Pierre Ayraud was born on 3 July 1908 in Rochefort-sur-Mer to a family of seamen. He lost one eye in a childhood accident, which prevented him from going into a seafaring business. In his youth, he used to go fishing on the Charente river near two hamlets called St. Thomas and Narcejac, and he remembered them when picking his pen name – "Thomas Narcejac". He studied at the universities of Bordeaux, Poitiers and Paris where he received degrees in literature and philosophy. He moved to Nantes in 1945, where he became a professor of philosophy and literature at the Lycée Georges-Clemenceau, and held this position until his retirement in 1967.

Narcejac began writing pastiches of various crime fiction authors which were published in the collections Confidences dans ma nuit (1946) and Nouvelles confidences dans ma nuit (1947). At the same time, he wrote his first crime novel L'Assassin de minuit (1945). Narcejac also partnered with Serge Arcouët, who used the pseudonym "Terry Stewart", to produce a series of novels imitating American thrillers. They were published under the joint pen name "John-Silver Lee".

In 1947, Narcejac also published an essay titled L'esthétique du roman policier ("The Esthetics of the Crime Novel") which drew Pierre Boileau's attention. The two writers began to correspond and finally met at the awards dinner in 1948, where Narcejac was receiving the Prix du Roman d'Aventures for his novel La mort est du voyage. Two years later, they began writing together, with Boileau providing the plots and Narcejac the atmosphere and characterisation, not unlike Frederic Dannay and Manfred Lee ("Ellery Queen").

Their first collaborative effort, L’ombre et la proie (1951), published under the name "Alain Bouccarèje" (the anagram of Boileau-Narcejac), went largely unnoticed. Their second novel She Who Was No More (1952), signed "Boileau-Narcejac", became their breakthrough, and was later filmed by Henri-Georges Clouzot as Les Diaboliques. Their success was further sealed when Alfred Hitchcock adapted The Living and the Dead (1954) as Vertigo in 1958.

Boileau and Narcejac also worked as screenwriters, most notably on the adaptation of the novel Les yeux sans visage by Jean Redon into the horror movie known in English as Eyes Without a Face (1960).

Their works often flirted with the fantastic and the macabre, erupting full-blown in their novel Et mon tout est un homme (published in English as Choice Cuts) which received the Grand Prix de l’Humour Noir in 1965.

In 1964, they published Le Roman policier, a theoretical study of the crime genre.

In the 1970s, Boileau and Narcejac received the permission from the Maurice Leblanc estate to write new adventures of Arsène Lupin. They also wrote the "Sans Atout" series for younger readers, about a boy detective.

Their collaboration ended with Boileau's death on 16 January 1989 in Beaulieu-sur-Mer. The last novel containing his contribution was J'ai été un fantôme ("I was a ghost") published later that year. Narcejac continued writing alone, still signing his works as "Boileau-Narcejac". He died on 7 June 1998 in Nice.

=== Personal life ===
Boileau was married in 1939 to Josette Baudin.

Narcejac was married twice—in 1930 to Marie Thérèse Baret, with whom he had two daughters, Annette and Jacqueline, and in 1967 to Renée Swanson.

== Writing style ==
Narcejac, who was the team's stylist and theoretician, wrote: "I felt that the best kind of detective novel could not be written by any one person, since it involved the improbable blending, in a single individual, of two opposite personalities: the technician’s and the psychologist’s." He pointed out that the success of their collaboration lies in the fact that Boileau "was interested in the 'hows' and I was interested in the 'whys' of a story."

Boileau and Narcejac were exponents of what they termed "le roman de la victime" ("the victim novel") which may be defined as a suspense novel that adopts the victim's point of view. "Boileau-Narcejac characters typically have character traits which make them susceptible and vulnerable, and they find themselves in situations under pressure. The more they resist, the greater the pressure, and the more inevitable their eventual fate. The situation in question may take the reader into the realms of the fantastic or supernatural before a final twist reveals the workings of some criminal machination. By which time it may be too late for the victim, and the reader should have been drawn into a climate of unease, disorientation, and angst. This is a constant in Boileau-Narcejac’s work, a formula which realizes suspense through the rhythmic combination of retention and release…"

François Guérif notes that the team's brand of psychological suspense was inspired by Cornell Woolrich but remarks that the latter's victim characters are always sympathetic which is not always the case with Boileau-Narcejac.

The editors of World Authors, 1950-1970 wrote that Boileau-Narcejac's novels "reflect Narcejac's admiration for Simenon in their compelling use of atmosphere but have none of the scrupulous naturalism of the Maigret stories." They also said that the duo's work "at least in translation, is stylistically undistinguished, but for most critics this fact is outweighed by the ingenuity of their plots and their power to involve the reader in the mood of doubt and mounting fear that they so skillfully evoke."

== Legacy ==
While their contemporaries in the late 1940s and 1950s were fascinated by an imaginary America, Boileau and Narcejac are credited with having helped to form an authentically French subgenre of crime fiction. They emphasized local settings and stressed the psychological dimension of coolly calculated and diabolically engineered crimes, revolving around greed, corruption, and what they called "the dark side of reason." "Boileau and Narcejac thus provided an indigenous French equivalent to the American film noir, but without having to detour through a reference to the USA".

Michel Lafon and Benoît Peeters praised Boileau and Narcejac for the renewal of the crime novel in the 1950s by finding "the third way between the English-style whodunit and the North American hard-boiled novel."

Only two English translations of their novels are currently in print and their reputation in the English-speaking world has been largely superseded by the film adaptations made by Hitchcock and Clouzot. Robin Wood wrote about The Living and the Dead: "The drab, willful pessimism of D’entre les morts is an essentially different world from the intense traffic sense of Vertigo, which derives from a simultaneous awareness of the immense value of human relationships and their inherent incapability of perfect realization." Christopher Lloyd made a similar comment about She Who Was No More: "Many spectators and readers would probably agree that Clouzot’s film outclasses the original novel both in terms of creating horror and suspense, and in displaying an insouciant disregard for implausibilities of plot." He also remarked: "If Boileau-Narcejac are genuine innovators in detective fiction, then, it is certainly not because of their psychological realism or sociological perspicacity, but essentially because of their reconfiguration of plot and the conflictual relations between characters."

A street in Nantes was named after Thomas Narcejac in 2010.

In 2023, the French television movie Adieu Vinyle, starring Isabelle Adjani, Grégory Fitoussi and Barbara Pravi, adapted the duo's novel A cœur perdu.

== Bibliography ==
Only a handful of Boileau-Narcejac works have been translated into English, and most of these translations are out of print.

- 1952 – Celle qui n'était plus; English translation: The Woman Who Was No More (Rinehart, 1954), also published as The Fiends (Arrow, 1956) and She Who Was No More (Pushkin Vertigo, 2015).
- 1952 – Les Visages de l'ombre; English translation: Faces in the Dark (Hutchinson, 1955).
- 1954 – D'entre les morts ("From amongst the dead"); English translation: The Living and the Dead (1956), also published as Vertigo (Dell, 1958; Pushkin Vertigo, 2015).
- 1955 – Les Louves; English translation: The Prisoner (Hutchinson, 1957).
- 1956 – Le mauvais oeil; English translation: The Evil Eye (Hutchinson, 1959).
- 1956 – Au bois dormant; English translation: Sleeping Beauty (1959).
- 1957 – Les magiciennes ("The Sorceresses").
- 1958 – L'ingénieur aimait trop les chiffres; English translation: The Tube (Hamish Hamilton, 1960).
- 1959 – À cœur perdu; English translation: Heart to Heart (Hamish Hamilton, 1959).
- 1961 – Maléfices; English translation: Spells of Evil (Hamish Hamilton, 1961).
- 1962 – Maldonne ("Misdeal").
- 1964 – Les victimes; English translation: Who Was Clare Jallu? (Barker, 1965), also published as The Victims (Panther, 1967).
- 1965 – Le train bleu s'arrête treize fois ("The Blue Train Stops Thirteen Times"; short stories).
- 1965 – Et mon tout est un homme ("And My Entirety Is a Man"); English translation: Choice Cuts (Barker, 1966)
- 1967 – La mort a dit : Peut-être ("Death Said: Perhaps")
- 1969 – La Porte du large
- 1969 – Delirium, suivi de L'Île
- 1970 – Les Veufs ("The Widowers").
- 1972 – La Vie en miettes
- 1973 – Opération Primevère
- 1974 – Frère Judas
- 1975 – La Tenaille
- 1976 – La lèpre ("The leper").
- 1978 – L'âge bête ("Awkward Age").
- 1979 – Carte vermeil ("Scarlet Card").
- 1980 – Les intouchables ("The Untouchables").
- 1980 – Terminus.
- 1981 – Box-office .
- 1983 – Mamie.
- 1984 – Les Eaux dormantes.
- 1984 – La Dernière Cascade ("The Last Stunt").
- 1985 – Schuss.
- 1987 – Mister Hyde.
- 1988 – Champ clos.
- 1988 – Le Contrat ("The Contract").
- 1989 – J'ai été un fantôme ("I Was a Ghost").
- 1990 – Le Bonsaï.
- 1990 – Le soleil dans la main ("The Sun in the Hand").
- 1991 – La main passe ("Turning Tables").
- 1991 – Les nocturnes ("Nocturnes").

Boileau-Narcejac also wrote the "Sans Atout" juvenile fiction series. They relate the adventures of a young boy detective.

- Les pistolets de Sans Atout ("The Guns of Sans Atout").
- Sans Atout contre l'homme à la dague ("Sans Atout Versus the Man With the Dagger").
- Sans Atout et le cheval fantôme ("Sans Atout and the Ghost Horse").
- Sans Atout, une étrange disparition ("Sans Atout: A Strange Disappearance").
- Sans Atout, l'invisible agresseur ("Sans Atout: The Invisible Stalker").
- Sans Atout, la vengeance de la mouche (“Sans Atout: The Vengeance of the Fly”).
- Sans Atout dans la gueule du loup ("Sans Atout in the Gullet of the Wolf").
- Sans Atout, le cadavre fait le mort (“Sans Atout: The Cadaver Made Dead”)

The pair also added five authorized sequels to Maurice Leblanc's series about gentleman thief Arsène Lupin.

- Le Secret d'Eunerville (1973).
- La Poudrière (1974).
- Le Second visage d'Arsène Lupin (1975).
- La Justice d'Arsène Lupin (1977).
- Le Serment d'Arsène Lupin (1979).

== Notable cinematic adaptations ==
- Les Diaboliques, directed by Henri-Georges Clouzot (France, 1955, based on the novel Celle qui n'était plus)
- Les Louves, directed by Luis Saslavsky (France, 1957, based on the novel Les Louves)
- Vertigo, directed by Alfred Hitchcock (1958, based on the novel D'entre les morts)
- Murder at 45 R.P.M., directed by Étienne Périer (France, 1960, based on the novel À cœur perdu)
- Les Magiciennes, directed by Serge Friedman (France, 1960, based on the novel Les Magiciennes)
- Faces in the Dark, directed by David Eady (UK, 1960, based on the novel Les Visages de l'ombre)
- Where the Truth Lies, directed by Henri Decoin (France, 1962, based on the novel Maléfices)
- Choice Cuts, abandoned Arthur P. Jacobs production with James Bridges screenplay (1967, based on the novel Et mon tout est un homme).
- Maldonne, directed by Sergio Gobbi (France, 1969, based on the novel Maldonne)
- Reflections of Murder, directed by John Badham (1974, TV film, based on the novel Celle qui n'était plus)
- Body Parts, directed by Eric Red (1991, based on the novel Et mon tout est un homme)
- Entangled, directed by Max Fischer (Canada, 1993, based on the novel Les Veufs)
- Diabolique, directed by Jeremiah S. Chechik (1996, based on the novel Celle qui n'était plus)
- Adieu Vinyle directed by Josée Dayan (2023)

=== Screenwriters ===
- S.O.S. Noronha, directed by Georges Rouquier (France, 1957)
- Twelve Hours By the Clock, directed by Géza von Radványi (France, 1959)
- Witness in the City, directed by Édouard Molinaro (France-Italy, 1959)
- Un témoin dans la ville, directed by Édouard Molinaro (France, 1959)
- Eyes Without a Face, directed by Georges Franju (France, 1960)
- Spotlight on a Murderer, directed by Georges Franju (France, 1961)
