= What Just Happened (2008 film) =

- Theatrical release poster
- Directed by: Barry Levinson
- Written by: Art Linson
- Based on: What Just Happened? Bitter Hollywood Tales from the Front Line by Art Linson
- Produced by: Art Linson; Robert De Niro; Jane Rosenthal; Barry Levinson
- Starring: Robert De Niro; Sean Penn; Catherine Keener; Stanley Tucci; John Turturro; Robin Wright; Moon Bloodgood; Kristen Stewart; Michael Wincott; Bruce Willis; Peter Jacobson
- Cinematography: Stéphane Fontaine
- Edited by: Hank Corwin
- Music by: Marcelo Zarvos
- Production companies: 2929 Productions; TriBeCa Productions; Linson Films
- Distributed by: Magnolia Pictures
- Release dates: January 19, 2008 (Sundance); May 25, 2008 (Cannes); October 17, 2008 (United States)
- Running time: 104 minutes
- Country: United States
- Language: English
- Budget: $25 million
- Box office: $6.7 million

What Just Happened is a 2008 American satirical comedy-drama directed by Barry Levinson and starring Robert De Niro. The supporting cast includes Catherine Keener, Robin Wright, Stanley Tucci, Moon Bloodgood, John Turturro, Sean Penn, Michael Wincott, Kristen Stewart and Bruce Willis. It is an independent film produced by 2929 Productions, Art Linson Productions and Tribeca Productions, and it was released on October 17, 2008.

The film is based on the 2002 book What Just Happened? Bitter Hollywood Tales from the Front Line by Art Linson about his experiences as a producer in Hollywood. This film was shown at the Cannes Film Festival on May 25, 2008.

== Plot ==
Ben, a veteran Hollywood producer, is suffering a number of professional and personal problems. His latest film, Fiercely, has a disastrous test screening, mostly because of its ending, which features the murder of its main character, played by Sean Penn, along with his pet dog.

Ben and his maverick British director Jeremy Brunell plead their case to studio executive Lou Tarnow. She accuses Ben of filming the dog's killing only so that he could use it as a "bargaining chip", to make it easier to negotiate against cutting other problematic scenes. Lou threatens to pull Ben's movie from Cannes and take over editing unless at least the dog's death is removed. Jeremy adamantly refuses, throwing a tantrum.

Adding to Ben's problems, he has trouble making a clean break from Kelly, his second wife. Ben soon discovers that his wife is having an affair with Scott Solomon, a married screenwriter with whom Ben has previously worked. Scott has a screenplay that he is trying to get off the ground, to which Brad Pitt soon becomes attached.

Lastly, the studio is threatening to cancel a planned Bruce Willis movie because of the star's unwillingness to shave the large, thick beard that he has grown. Ben's career hinges on the fate of the film but any attempt to reason with Willis inevitably meets with a violent, adamant response against.

Ultimately, Jeremy relents and re-edits the ending of Fiercely to have the dog survive. Ben tries to persuade Willis' agent Dick Bell to reason with him and have the beard removed but his efforts result with Dick being fired. Nonetheless, Willis does eventually shave off his beard and the film's production continues.

A week later, Ben, Lou and Jeremy attend Cannes, hopeful that they may take a Palme d'Or award. Unfortunately, and without telling Ben or Lou, Jeremy has re-edited Fiercely again, not only killing the dog but adding nearly a full minute of bullets being shot into their bodies. While the new ending destroys the film's chances of a Palme d'Or and angers many in the audience, others eagerly applaud the final version of the film, including Penn. Lou is not impressed, and immediately leaves Cannes on the studio's private jet, leaving Ben stranded in France.

Ben eventually makes it home, in time for a photo shoot of Hollywood's top thirty producers with Vanity Fair, although after the magazine's publishers hear about the debacle in Cannes, Ben is relegated to the far edge of the photo, meaning that he will be barely noticeable.

== Cast ==
- Robert De Niro as Ben
- Kristen Stewart as Zoe
- Sean Penn as himself
- Catherine Keener as Lou Tarnow
- Bruce Willis as himself
- John Turturro as Dick Bell
- Michael Wincott as Jeremy Brunell
- Moon Bloodgood as Laura
- Robin Wright as Kelly
- Stanley Tucci as Scott Solomon
- Christopher Evan Welch as Studio Marketing Guy
- Lily Rabe as Dawn
- Peter Jacobson as Cal
- Paul Herman as Jerry

== Production ==
Principal photography began on March 22, 2007. Most of the exterior shots were filmed in Los Angeles. In April 2007, the production moved to Connecticut due to tax credit incentives offered by the state. Interior shots were filmed there, including in Stamford, Bridgeport, Shelton, Ridgefield and Greenwich.

== Critical reception ==
On the review aggregator website Rotten Tomatoes, 49% of 140 critics' reviews are positive, with an average rating of 5.7/10. The website's consensus reads: "What Just Happened has some inspired comic moments, but this inside-baseball take on Hollywood lacks satirical bite." Metacritic, which uses a weighted average, assigned the film a score of 51 out of 100, based on 18 critics, indicating "mixed or average" reviews.
