= Podesta Baldocchi =

Former florist in San Francisco, California, US

Coordinates: 37.7892°N 122.4051°W

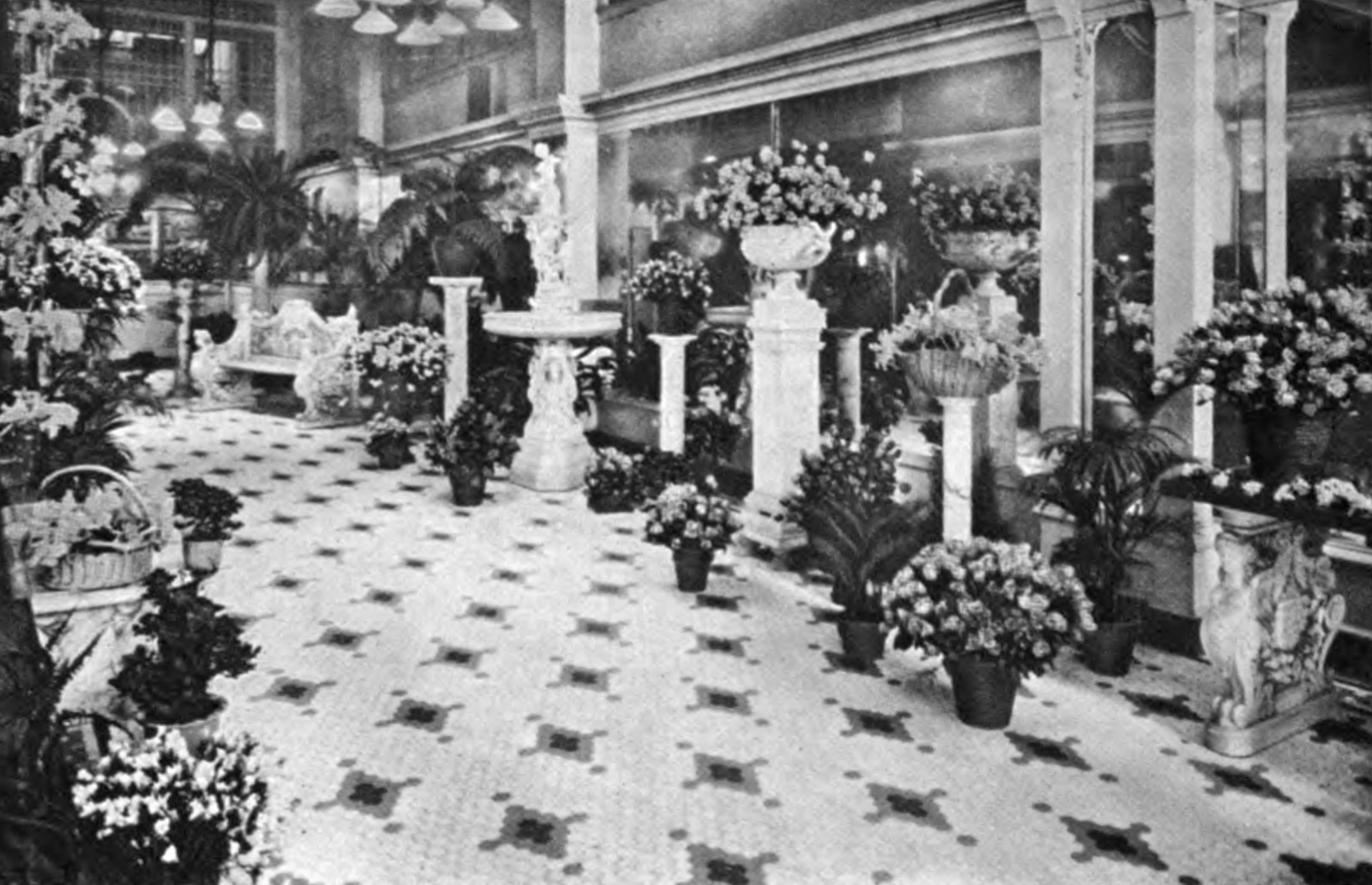
- Shop interior, 1922
- Formerly: Podesta and Baldocchi
- Industry: Floriculture
- Founded: 1871
- Fate: Merged with Rossi & Rovetti
- Successor: Rossi & Rovetti
- Headquarters: 224 Grant Avenue, San Francisco, California, U.S.
- Area served: San Francisco Bay Area
- Products: Floral arrangements, flowers

Podesta and Baldocchi, later Podesta Baldocchi, was one of the oldest operating florists in San Francisco, founded in 1871. The business is no longer operating.

Their headquarters on 224 Grant Avenue, with Italian marble artwork and tile floors, acquired from the 1915 Panama-Pacific International Exposition, was featured in Alfred Hitchcock's 1958 film Vertigo.

== History ==
In September 1999, Podesta Baldocchi was sold to Gerald Stevens Inc., which once operated a network of 231 floral online locations, delivering flowers, in 28 markets in the United States.

In November 2001, San Francisco native Marc Rovetti took ownership of Podesta Baldocchi. Rovetti's father had emigrated from Italy in the 1950s and had worked at Podesta Baldocchi before starting his own floral business. Rovetti sold Podesta Baldocchi to the Rossi & Rovetti floral shop in 2001.
