= Adieu Vinyle =

2023 TV movie directed by Josée Dayan

- Written by: Sylvain Saada
- Directed by: Josée Dayan
- Starring: Isabelle Adjani, Mathieu Amalric, Barbara Pravi, Grégory Fitoussi
- Music by: Benjamin Biolay, Barbara Pravi, Bruno Coulais
- Country of origin: France
- Original language: French

Production
- Producers: Dominique Besnehard, Antoine Le Carpentier
- Production company: France 2

Original release
- Network: RTS 1
- Release: 15 September 2023
- Network: France 2
- Release: 8 September 2023

Adieu Vinyle is a French television movie directed by Josée Dayan, broadcast in Switzerland on 15 September 2023 on RTS 1 and on 18 September 2023 on France 2. The movie adapts the novel Á coeur perdu by Boileau-Narcejac (Pierre Boileau and Thomas Narcejac).

== Synopsis ==
In the 1960s, Éve Faugères is at her career peak as a musician and is torn between two men. Meanwhile, Florence is a young, passionate singer who is also an unconditional lover, ready to do anything to take Éve's place.

== Cast ==
- Isabelle Adjani as Éve Faugère
- Mathieu Amalric as Maurice Faugère
- Matthieu Dessertine as Jean Mauduit
- Barbara Pravi as Florence Carel
- Jacques Bonnaffé as Commissioner Borel
- Jérôme Deschamps as Antoine Meliot
- Grégory Fitoussi as Stéphane Carel
- Hugues Quester as Ghost with the package
- Julie Dumas as Violette

== Production ==
The movie is directed by Josee Dayan and it accompanies screenplay by Sylvian Saada. The producers are Dominique Besnehard and Antoine Le Carpentier for Mon Voisin Productions.

Singer Barbara Pravi was advised by Dayan to play Florence. She confided to France Info: "It's incredible to have had the chance to do this, especially since Josée chose me. I didn't go through an audition to play this role. In this fiction, Eve is a bit of a positive force and Florence is a bit of a negative force. That being said, she herself is obsessed with this woman and would dream of being her". Filming commenced on 26 December 2022 and ended on 25 January 2023.

== Audience and critics ==
In France, the TV film was broadcast on France 2 and was watched by 1.9 million people, or 10% of the public, thus placed third in the daily rankings.

The weekly Télécâble Sat Hebdo was very critical of the TV film publishing: "This thriller suffers from outdated direction, dialogues weighed down by clichés with Isabelle Adjani totally perched between self-caricature and simpering".

Télé-Loisirs published: "This thriller, freely adapted from À cœur perdu by Boileau-Narcejac published in 1959, turns out to be tedious, with lines and sequences that are sometimes a little abrupt".

On the contrary, the newspaper Première published: "Adieu vinyle deserves our attention. Precisely, because of the performance of the actors who manage to transcend this climate. Starting obviously with Isabelle Adjani, the interpreter of Eve, a fascinating heroine because caught at a turning point in her love and artistic lives and that the actress composes with a unique aura and a gentle assumed madness".

Tele 2 Semaines added: "Despite some clumsiness, this disturbing drama about jealousy benefits from careful artistic direction and a particularly convincing performance."
