= Les Diaboliques (film) =

1955 French noir psychological thriller film by Henri-Georges Clouzot

- Theatrical release poster
- Directed by: Henri-Georges Clouzot
- Screenplay by: Henri-Georges Clouzot; Jérôme Géronimi; René Masson (Note: Collaboration.); Frédéric Grendel
- Based on: Celle qui n'était plus by Boileau-Narcejac
- Produced by: Henri-Georges Clouzot; Georges Lourau
- Starring: Simone Signoret; Véra Clouzot; Paul Meurisse; Charles Vanel
- Cinematography: Armand Thirard
- Edited by: Madeleine Gug
- Music by: Georges Van Parys
- Production companies: Filmsonor; Vera Film
- Distributed by: Cinédis
- Release date: 29 January 1955
- Running time: 117 minutes
- Country: France
- Language: French

Les Diaboliques (French: [le djabɔlik], lit. transl. The Diabolical Ones or Diabolical Women, released as Diabolique in the United States and variously translated as The Devils or The Fiends) is a 1955 French psychological thriller film co-written and directed by Henri-Georges Clouzot, and starring Simone Signoret, Véra Clouzot, Paul Meurisse, and Charles Vanel. The story blends elements of psychological thriller, crime drama and psychological horror, with the plot focusing on a woman and her husband's mistress who conspire to murder the man. It is based on the 1952 novel Celle qui n'était plus (lit. transl. The One Who Was No More) by Pierre Boileau and Thomas Narcejac.

Clouzot, after finishing The Wages of Fear (1953), optioned the screenplay rights to the novel, preventing Alfred Hitchcock from making the film. The film helped inspire Hitchcock's Psycho (1960). Robert Bloch, the author of the novel Psycho, stated in an interview that his all-time favorite horror film was Les Diaboliques.

Released in France in January 1955, Les Diaboliques was the seventh highest-grossing film of the year, with a total of 3,674,380 admissions. It received largely favorable reviews from French critics, and won two Louis Delluc Prizes (for Best Film and Best Performance by Signoret). While reception in the United Kingdom was mixed, the film was favorably received by critics in the United States, where it won the title of Best Foreign Film of the year by the New York Film Critics Circle and the National Board of Review. By late 1956, it had become the highest-grossing French film released in the United States at that time.

Les Diaboliques went on to garner a reputation as a classic film with significant influence on the horror genre, particularly due to its twist ending. It is now regarded as influential masterpiece, one of the best French films and thriller movies ever made.

== Plot ==
A second-rate boys' boarding school in Saint-Cloud, Hauts-de-Seine, in the Paris metropolitan area, is run by the tyrannical and cruel Michel Delassalle. The school is owned, however, by Delassalle's wife Christina, a wealthy, devout Catholic émigrée from Venezuela who works there as a Spanish teacher. The frail Christina suffers from a chronic heart condition. Despite Christina's unstable health, Michel subjects her to significant emotional abuse, humiliating and mocking her, as well as mistreating the students. He also carries on an extramarital relationship with Nicole Horner, another teacher at the school, whom he physically abuses. Rather than antagonism, Christina and Nicole have a somewhat close relationship, primarily based on their apparent mutual hatred of Michel.

Unable to stand his mistreatment any longer, Nicole devises a plan to murder Michel. Though hesitant at first, Christina ultimately consents to help Nicole. Using a threatened divorce to lure Michel to Nicole's apartment building in Niort, a town several hundred kilometers away, Christina sedates him with laced whiskey before the two women drown him in a bathtub. Concealing his body in a wicker trunk, the women drive back to the school, where they dump his corpse in the school's unused swimming pool. When his corpse floats to the top, they think it will appear to have been an accident. Almost everything goes according to their plans until the body fails to surface. Michel's corpse is nowhere to be found when the pool is drained. Afterwards, the suit that Michel had been wearing when they drowned him is returned from the dry cleaners. When the proprietor of the dry cleaners also returns a key to a room in a nearby hotel that was with the clothes, Christina goes to the room. There, the cleaning man tells her that Michel had kept the room for a while but was rarely if ever seen and stored nothing there.

Nicole sees in the newspaper that the police have found the corpse in the Seine. However, when Christina goes to the morgue, she finds it is not actually Michel's body. There, she meets Alfred Fichet, a retired senior policeman now working as a private detective. He becomes involved in the case, much to Nicole's chagrin.

Christina, Nicole and other teachers find a student who claims that Michel has ordered him to rake leaves as punishment for breaking a window. Accusing him of lying, Christina confiscates his slingshot. Under the stress, Christina's heart condition worsens, and her doctors fear she may die soon unless she maintains strict bed rest. When the school photograph is taken, the result seems to show Michel's spectral figure in the window behind the students. Unnerved, Nicole leaves the school; she asks Christina to accompany her, but she is too ill and afraid.

Overcome by fear, Christina confesses everything to Alfred. He does not believe her, but he investigates the pool. That night, Christina hears noises and wanders around the school. When she realizes that someone is following her, she runs back to her room. There, she finds Michel's corpse submerged in the bathtub, which is filled with water. Michel rises from the tub, and Christina suffers a fatal heart attack. It is revealed that Michel and Nicole have set up Christina from the beginning, with Michel acting as a vengeful ghost to scare Christina to death. However, Alfred hears their celebration and exposes their plot, telling them they will be sentenced to 15 to 20 years in prison, depending on the judge.

The school is closed in the wake of the scandal. As the children and teachers leave, the same boy who had earlier broken a window breaks another. When asked how he recovered his slingshot, the boy says that Christina gave it to him.

== Cast ==
- Simone Signoret as Nicole Horner
- Véra Clouzot as Christina Delassalle
- Paul Meurisse as Michel Delassalle
- Charles Vanel as Alfred Fichet
- Jean Brochard as Plantiveau
- Thérèse Dorny as M^{me} Herboux
- Michel Serrault as M. Raymond
- Georges Chamarat as Dr. Loisy
- Robert Dalban as the gas station attendant
- Camille Guérini as the photographer
- Jacques Hilling as the employee of the forensic institute
- Jean Lefebvre as the soldier
- Aminda Montserrat as M^{me} Plantiveau
- Jean Témerson as the hotel waiter
- Jacques Varennes as M. Bridoux
- Georges Poujouly as Soudieu
- Noël Roquevert as M. Herboux
- Pierre Larquey as M. Drain
- Johnny Hallyday as a student (uncredited)
- Madeleine Suffel as the degreaser (uncredited)

== Themes ==
Film historian Susan Hayward regards Les Diaboliques as "something of an unsettled text" which crosses genres, combining elements of psychological thrillers and film noir, ultimately classifying it as "a transgressive and transcendent film noir. There is fragmentation and excess, both of which are played out through the narrative and the body, and both of which function to challenge the constructed order of things, social restrictions, established laws and hierarchies as they relate to notions of censorship and sexuality."

While the film's source novel explicitly reveals a lesbian relationship between Mireille and Lucienne, the equivalents of Christina and Nicole, the film eliminates this element; however, Hayward suggests that this implication is still present, though allowing other interpretations: "It can equally be seen for what it is (albeit the filmic text tries to hide it away), namely a lesbian relationship. It can also be seen as a mother-daughter relationship. Nicole takes care of Christina; she speaks to her at times as a mother would to a daughter. Patiently and meticulously she explains why the murder must be carried out and why it must be carried out in a particular way. She is protective of her sexual immaturity. She soothes her when Michel is cruel to her (and so on). Already, we are looking at three types of ambiguity here, unfixing the social order of things. Nothing remains in place."

Academic Daniel Tilsley interprets Les Diaboliques as a film whose horror emerges "because of the perceptual dissonance between the subjective and the objective world, with the psychologically tormented protagonist Christina unable to accurately make sense of the world around her... [the film] focuses on the gradual distortion of Christina's perception of the world around her as she is plunged deeper and deeper into fear."

== Production ==
=== Writing ===
Director Henri-Georges Clouzot's wife, Véra, initially drew his attention to the Boileau-Narcejac novel on which the film is based. Clouzot read it through the night and optioned the rights the following morning. He and his brother Jean (who took the pseudonym Jérôme Géronimi) spent 18 months adapting the novel. In the book, the action takes place between Enghien-les-Bains and Nantes but Clouzot transposed it to Saint-Cloud and Niort, his own birthplace. He was not particularly interested in the insurance scam that was the criminal motive in the book. He switched the gender of the murderers and invented the private-school setting.

Film historian Susan Hayward suggests that the gender switch made by Clouzot was caused not so much by censorship considerations (in the source novel, Lucienne and Mireille turn out to be a pair of lesbian lovers), but by his desire to create a sizeable role for his wife. The book has only one principal female character, Lucienne, since the supposed victim, Mireille disappears early on. Véra, with her distinctly feminine demeanor, was ill-suited for the role of Lucienne (called Nicole in the film). So in Clouzot's script, Mireille (now named Christina) is the character who has a weak heart, and is the object of manipulation of her husband Michel and his mistress Nicole. Clouzot also followed the convention that the culprits should be exposed by the detective in the end (another departure from the novel, where the authors let them get away).

=== Casting ===
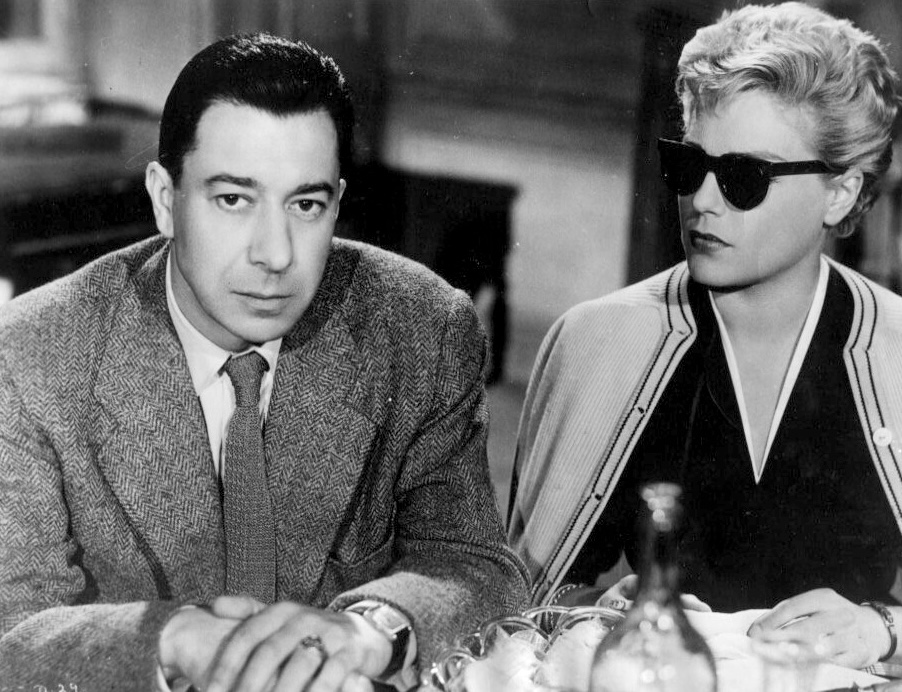
Paul Meurisse and Simone Signoret in publicity still for the film's U.S. release

Véra was the first to be cast in the film in the role of Christina. Director Clouzot cast Simone Signoret opposite her in the role of Nicole; he previously directed Signoret's husband Yves Montand in The Wages of Fear, and the two couples became friends. Clouzot was also aware of his wife's Vera's limitations as an actress, and sought someone to lend her support in such a demanding role.

Signoret signed an eight-week contract but the shooting actually took 16 weeks. She ended up being paid for only eight weeks of work despite staying until the end of the filming because she neglected to read the small print. Signoret's co-star Paul Meurisse also recalls in his memoirs that the actress was further bemused by Clouzot's constant attempts to find clever ways of lighting Vera's face while muting the light on Signoret so she would not upstage his wife.

Clouzot had known Meurisse since 1939, when the latter was attempting to pursue a singing career. Clouzot then was trying to sell his song lyrics to Edith Piaf, Meurisse's lover at the time. By the late 1940s, Meurisse had become an established stage and screen actor, known for the roles of "icy and sophisticated villains," and he seemed a natural choice for the role of Michel.

The film featured two Clouzot regulars: Pierre Larquey as M. Drain and Noël Roquevert as M. Herboux. Michel Serrault made his screen debut as M. Raymond, one of the schoolteachers. Charles Vanel—who previously co-starred in Clouzot's The Wages of Fear—was cast as the seemingly inept Inspector Fichet.

Clouzot also auditioned 300 children and selected 35. Among them were Jean-Philippe Smet (the future Johnny Hallyday), Patrick Dewaere's brother Yves-Marie Maurin, and Georges Poujouly, who previously received acclaim in René Clément's Forbidden Games.

=== Filming ===
The filming began on 18 August 1954 and finished on 30 November the same year. Clouzot asked his assistant Michel Romanoff to find a suitable filming location for the boarding school. The latter discovered a decrepit chateau in L'Etang-la-Ville between Saint-Cloud and the Bois-du-Boulogne. The building and its surroundings matched the director's vision perfectly since they projected the desired mood of decay and neglect, featuring an adjacent swimming pool that was dirty and full of slime. Clouzot spent five weeks shooting at this location.

The screenplay placed Nicole's apartment in Niort, but the actual house used for filming was in Montfort-l'Amaury, just opposite the building that previously appeared in Clouzot's Le Corbeau. The morgue scenes were shot inside an actual mortuary at the Institut Médico-légal in Paris. The rest was filmed at Saint-Maurice Studios southeast of Paris, which took an additional nine weeks. The interior sets were designed by Léon Barsacq. Cinematographer Armand Thirard used two camera crews to speed up the shooting that was falling behind schedule. Despite his efforts, the filming took twice longer than the projected 48 days. Thirard shot the majority of the film using predominately medium shots and close-ups to accentuate a sense of anxiety and claustrophobia.

The film's central murder sequence in which Meurisse's character is drowned in the bathtub was shot over a period of two days. To prevent the actor from becoming ill, the crew filled the bathtub with hot water for each take, and in between shots, Meurisse was redressed in dry clothes and given whisky toddies.

Originally the film was to be called Les Veuves (The Widows) but this was deemed unmarketable. Eleven weeks into filming it was changed to Les Démoniaques. Eventually it was renamed Les Diaboliques but this title was already used for a collection of short stories by the 19th-century writer Barbey d'Aurevilly. Clouzot was permitted to use this title but only on the condition that he give the author a proper mention. He did it by opening the film with a quote from the preface to d'Aurevilly's work: "A portrait is always moral when it is tragic and shows the horror of the things it represents."

== Release ==
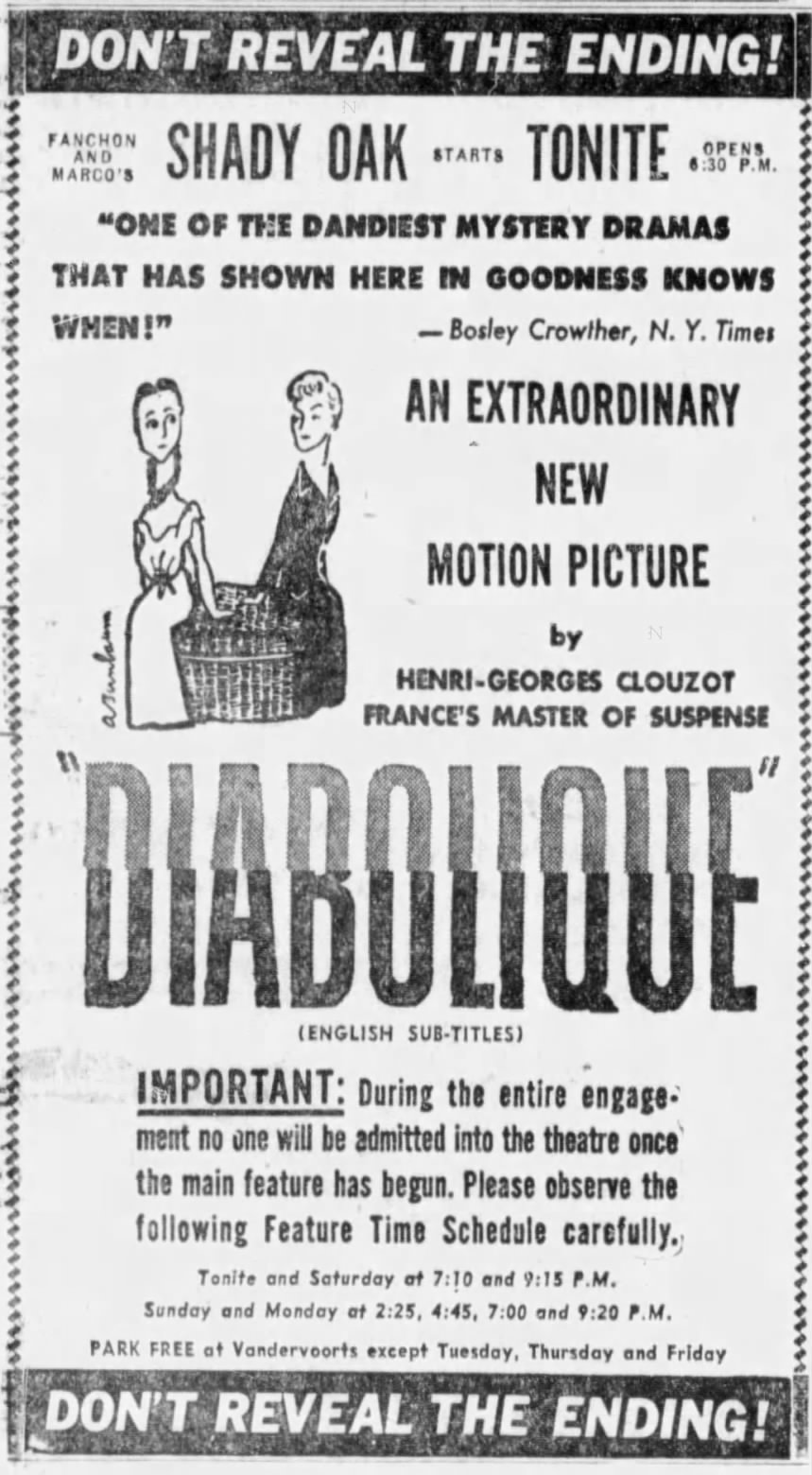
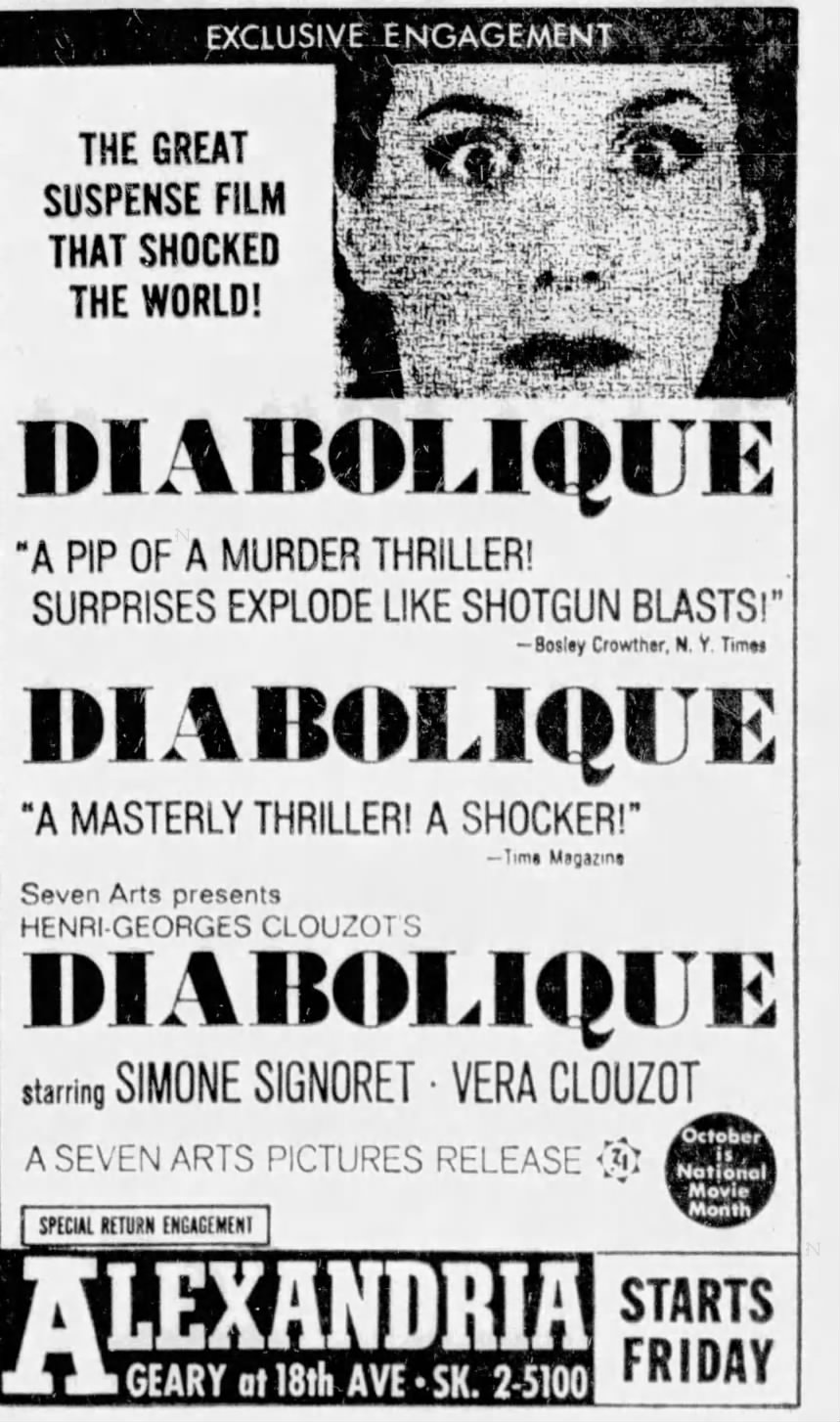
U.S. newspaper advertisements for the film (left, original 1955 release; right, 1966 re-release)

Les Diaboliques premiered on 29 January 1955 at the Gaumont-Palace Berlitz, where it had an exclusive theatrical run for seventeen weeks. In the United States, a press review screening was held at New York City's Fine Arts Theater on Halloween 1955, followed by an official U.S. premiere there on 21 November 1955. The film's San Francisco release began the following month, on 28 December 1955, where it had a six month-long exhibition at the Larkin Theater. The film's St. Louis premiere occurred on 30 December 1955.

The Western premiere at the Esquire Theatre in Denver followed in late January 1956. For this engagement, the theater introduced a no-late-seating policy, described by the Rocky Mountain News as "unprecedented": "Because of the unusual nature of this motion picture, the Esquire Theater will not admit any patron after the main feature has begun." The practice predated Alfred Hitchcock's similar no-late-admission policy for Psycho by four years.

In the United Kingdom, the film premiered in London on 1 December 1955, under the title The Fiends.

Warner Bros.-Seven Arts theatrically reissued the film in the United States in the fall of 1966. In 1995, the film was given another theatrical re-release in the United States by Kino International commemorating its fortieth anniversary.

=== Marketing ===
Though it was swiftly described by critics as a horror film upon release, Les Diaboliques was marketed as a psychological thriller. Promotional materials for the film in the United States expressly warned audiences not to reveal the film's ending to the public, while British advertising materials indicated that theatre patrons would not be admitted once the film had started. In some theaters in the United States, ushers distributed slips of paper to theatergoers reading: "Contract and Article of Agreement for 'Diabolique': With the purchase of this ticket I agree that I will neither directly or indirectly reveal the ending to Henri-Georges Clouzot's picture to my relatives, friends, or enemies."

The film's end credits themselves contain an early example of such an "anti-spoiler" message requesting audience members not to disclose the twist ending:

Ne soyez pas DIABOLIQUES!
Ne détruisez pas l'intérêt que pourraient prendre vos amis à ce film.
Ne leur racontez pas ce que vous avez vu.
Merci pour eux.

Translation:

Don't be DIABOLICAL!
Do not destroy the interest that your friends may have in this movie.
Do not tell them what you have seen.
Thank you, on their behalf.

=== Home media ===
The Criterion Collection released Les Diaboliques on LaserDisc in December 1991 before issuing the film on DVD in July 1999. On 17 May 2011, Criterion reissued the film on DVD and Blu-ray. The latter release features selected-scene commentary by French-film scholar Kelley Conway, a new video introduction by Serge Bromberg, and a new video interview with novelist and film critic Kim Newman.

In the United Kingdom, Arrow Films issued a Blu-ray and DVD combination set on 25 April 2011. In France, the film was released in 4K Ultra HD and Blu-ray on 20 May 2025, by Coin de Mire Cinéma.

== Reception ==
=== Box office ===
Les Diaboliques created a sensation upon its French release and was a success at the box office with 3,674,380 admissions in France alone. It ranked seventh place for final audience figures in France by the end of the year. The film was also a major box-office hit in the United States, with estimated ticket sales of $600,000 (equivalent to $7.1 million in 2025) by September 1956, making it the highest-grossing French film in the country's history at that time.

=== Critical response ===
Critical reception for Les Diaboliques was highly favorable in both France and the United States. Bosley Crowther gave the film an enthusiastic review in The New York Times, calling it "one of the dandiest mystery dramas that has shown here" and "a pip of a murder thriller, ghost story and character play rolled into one". He added "the writing and the visual construction are superb, and the performance by top-notch French actors on the highest level of sureness and finesse." The Chicago Daily Tribune wrote, "If you like a good mystery and can stand it fairly morbid and uncompromising as to detail, this is one of the best offerings in a long time." The reviewer added, "You may suspect, as I did, one of the answers as the film nears its finale, but if you solve it all, you've missed your profession." Variety was more critical: “Although this has a few hallucinating bits of terror, the film is primarily a creaky-door type of melodrama. Its macabre aspects and lack of sympathy for the characters make this a hybrid which flounders between a blasting look at human infamy and an out-and-out contrived whodunit."

Dorothy Masters of the New York Daily News praised the lead performances of Signoret, Clouzot, and Meurisse, and gave the film a three and a half out of four star-rating, summarizing: "The arch fiends of hell couldn't have plotted better than Pierre Boileau and Thomas Narcejac... The horrors, psychological and physical, make this a shocker worthy of the devil himself." Hortense Morton of the San Francisco Examiner praised the film as "a super suspense yarn knitted together with a deft Gallic touch. Madam Dufarge [sic] couldn't do better, and a splendid, very splendid cast, sees that no dramatic stitches are dropped." The National Board of Review named it among the best foreign films of 1955, and called it "a genuine thriller—a shocking, satisfying chunk of Grand Guignol psychological suspense."

Reviews from British film critics were less favorable. Milton Shulman in the Sunday Express accused the film of "calculated malevolence", and commented that "it is no trick to sicken an audience by such blunt methods as these." C. A. Lejeune in The Observer called it "extremely clever and very horrid," and complained about "a vogue at the moment for the horrid in entertainment." Reg Whiteley in the Daily Mirror described it as "a suspenseful but sordid slice of French life," and exclaimed: "Just how horrible can films get?" Alan Brien of The Guardian Journal panned the film, writing that "as the work of a minor Hitchcock," the film would be "eminently acceptable. From Henri-Georges Clouzot, the director of The Wages of Fear, it must be reckoned a disappointment."

Roger Ebert, reviewing the film during its 1995 re-release, wrote: "The famous plot of the movie usually deceives first-time viewers, at least up to a point. The final revelations are somewhat disappointing, but Clouzot doesn't linger over them. The most disturbing elements of the movie are implied, not seen." Time Out commented that the film "makes for a great piece of Guignol misanthropy" where "everyone is in the end a victim, and their actions operate like snares setting traps that leave them grasping for survival."

On the review aggregator website Rotten Tomatoes, 95% of 85 critics' reviews are positive, with an average rating of 8.6/10. The website's consensus reads: "Cruel, dark, but undeniably effective, Diabolique is a suspense thriller as effective as Hitchcock's best work and with a brilliant twist ending."

=== Accolades ===
Award/association	Year	Category	Recipient(s) and nominee(s)	Result	Ref.
Edgar Allan Poe Awards	1956	Best Foreign Film		Won	
Louis Delluc Prize	1954	Best Film	Henri-Georges Clouzot	Won	
Louis Delluc Prize	1954	Best Actress	Simone Signoret	Won	
National Board of Review	1955	Top Foreign Film		Won	
New York Film Critics Circle Awards	1955	Best Foreign Film		Won (Note: Tied with Umberto D.)	

== Legacy and influence ==
Les Diaboliques is regarded among film critics and historians as an influential classic of the horror genre. The Harvard Film Archive describes the film as "a work of audacious trickery that entirely reinvented the rules for mystery cinema." Writing for Senses of Cinema in 2011, Pedro Blas Gonzalez describes Les Diaboliques as "one of the greatest suspense films of all time." It has also been cited as one of the scariest films ever made.

Kim Newman wrote in Empire: "The horrific mystery has lost only a fraction of its power over the years, though literally dozens of films (see: Deathtrap, Hush... Hush, Sweet Charlotte, Games etc.) have borrowed part or all of its tricky storyline. This was one of the first movies to depend on a twist ending which forces you to reassess everything you thought you had been told earlier in the film." The British Film Institute included it in their list of the "100 Best Thrillers of All Time", calling it "a compelling, grisly thriller... capped by an unforgettable twist ending." The Guardian listed it at number 19 among the 25 best horror films of all time. The scene in which Michel emerges from the bathtub ranked number 49 on Bravo's 100 Scariest Movie Moments.

Critical discussion of the film has often been linked to the films of Alfred Hitchcock. According to film historian Susan Hayward, Hitchcock missed out on purchasing the rights to the Boileau and Narcejac novel by just a few hours, with Clouzot getting to the authors first. (Note: François Truffaut, in his book-length interview Hitchcock/Truffaut (1967), suggested that Boileau and Narcejac then wrote D'Entre les Morts specifically for Hitchcock, who adapted the latter book for Vertigo (1958). However, Narcejac later refuted Truffaut's statement.) While making Vertigo (1958), Hitchcock frequently screened Les Diaboliques for himself as well as his collaborators. Milan Terlunen, writing for CrimeReads, views Les Diaboliques as a crucial progenitor of Hitchcock's Psycho (1960), and notes that both films "achieve something very rare: a perfect plot twist but an unspoilable movie." Academic Charles Barr characterizes the advertising campaign of Psycho as "a highly effective rip-off" of that of Les Diaboliques, utilizing similar marketing tactics cautioning and preventing audience members from revealing the film's surprise ending.

Robert Bloch, author of the 1959 novel Psycho on which the Hitchcock film was based, named Les Diaboliques as his favorite horror film of all time. British filmmaker Jimmy Sangster also cited it as a major influence on his writing and directing, stating: "most of my 'psycho' type movies... were derivative of each other and they all went back to my original inspiration: Les Diaboliques. I'm not the only one to follow that path. I guess I just did it more than most." Film historian Edmund G. Bansak also cites the film as a significant influence on American filmmaker William Castle.

== Related works ==
In 1964, television writer-producer-director Joseph Stefano was inspired by this film to create a pilot for a thriller anthology series for the American Broadcasting Company (ABC). Titled The Unknown, the pilot failed to take off. Stefano then rewrote and reshot it—adding fantasy elements in the process—as an episode of The Outer Limits called "The Forms of Things Unknown".

The 1967 film Games, directed by Curtis Harrington and starring James Caan and Katharine Ross, has a different basic situation, but similar twists at the end, and again features Simone Signoret as the corrupt woman of mystery.

An American television film version of Les Diaboliques, titled Reflections of Murder, was made by ABC in 1974, starring Tuesday Weld, Joan Hackett, and Sam Waterston. In 1993, another made-for-television film remake was made; this one was titled House of Secrets, and it starred Melissa Gilbert. In 1996, the film was remade again as Diabolique, adapted by Don Roos, directed by Jeremiah S. Chechik, and starring Sharon Stone and Isabelle Adjani in the leading female roles, with Chazz Palminteri as the husband and Kathy Bates as the detective.

== Sources ==
- Bansak, Edmund G. (2003). Fearing the Dark: The Val Lewton Career. Jefferson, North Carolina: McFarland & Company. ISBN 978-0-7864-1709-4.
- Barr, Charles (2021). "Hitchcock and Vertigo: French and Other Connections". In Gottlieb, Sidney; Martin, Donal (eds.). Haunted by Vertigo: Hitchcock's Masterpiece Then and Now. New Barnet, England: John Libbey Publishing. pp. 77–94. ISBN 978-0-861-96988-3.
- Buss, Robin (2001). French Film Noir. London, England: Marion Boyars. ISBN 978-0-714-53036-9. OCLC 44652477.
- Guérif, François (1986). Le cinéma policier français (in French). Artefact. ISBN 978-2-851-99403-5. OCLC 489779740.
- Hawkins, Joan (2002). ""See it From the Beginning": Hitchcock's Reconstruction of Film History". In Gottlieb, Sidney; Brookhouse, Christopher (eds.). Framing Hitchcock: Selected Essays from the Hitchcock Annual. Detroit, Michigan: Wayne State University Press. pp. 373–386. ISBN 978-0-814-33061-6.
- Hayward, Susan (2004). Simone Signoret: The Star as Cultural Sign. New York City, New York: Bloomsbury. ISBN 978-0-826-41394-9.
- Hayward, Susan (2005). Les Diaboliques (Henri-Georges Clouzot, 1955). French Film Guides. Urbana and Chicago, Illinois: University of Illinois Press. ISBN 978-0-252-03089-5.
- Huckvale, David (2014). Hammer Films' Psychological Thrillers, 1950–1972. Jefferson, North Carolina: McFarland & Company. ISBN 978-1-4766-0421-3. OCLC 870994470.
- Mayne, Judith (2000). Framed: Lesbians, Feminists, and Media Culture. Minneapolis, Minnesota: University of Minnesota Press. ISBN 978-0-816-63457-6. OCLC 43555067.
- Minot, Alain (June 1997). "Les diaboliques". L'Avant-scène (in French). Paris, France. ISSN 0045-1169.
- Schneider, Steven Jay, ed. (2007). 100 European Horror Films. BFI Screen Guides. London, England: British Film Institute. ISBN 978-1-84457-164-2. OCLC 175215721.
- Truffaut, François (1985). Hitchcock/Truffaut. New York City, New York: Simon & Schuster. ISBN 978-0-671-60429-5.
- Vermilye, Jerry, ed. (1988). 500 Best British and Foreign Films to Buy, Rent, or Videotape. National Board of Review of Motion Pictures (U.S.) (1st ed.). New York City, New York: W. Morrow. ISBN 978-0-688-07798-3. OCLC 16901342.
- Weismann, Brad (2021). Lost in the Dark: A World History of Horror Film. Jackson, Mississippi: University Press of Mississippi. ISBN 978-1-496-83323-5.
