= Vertigo (film) =

1958 film by Alfred Hitchcock

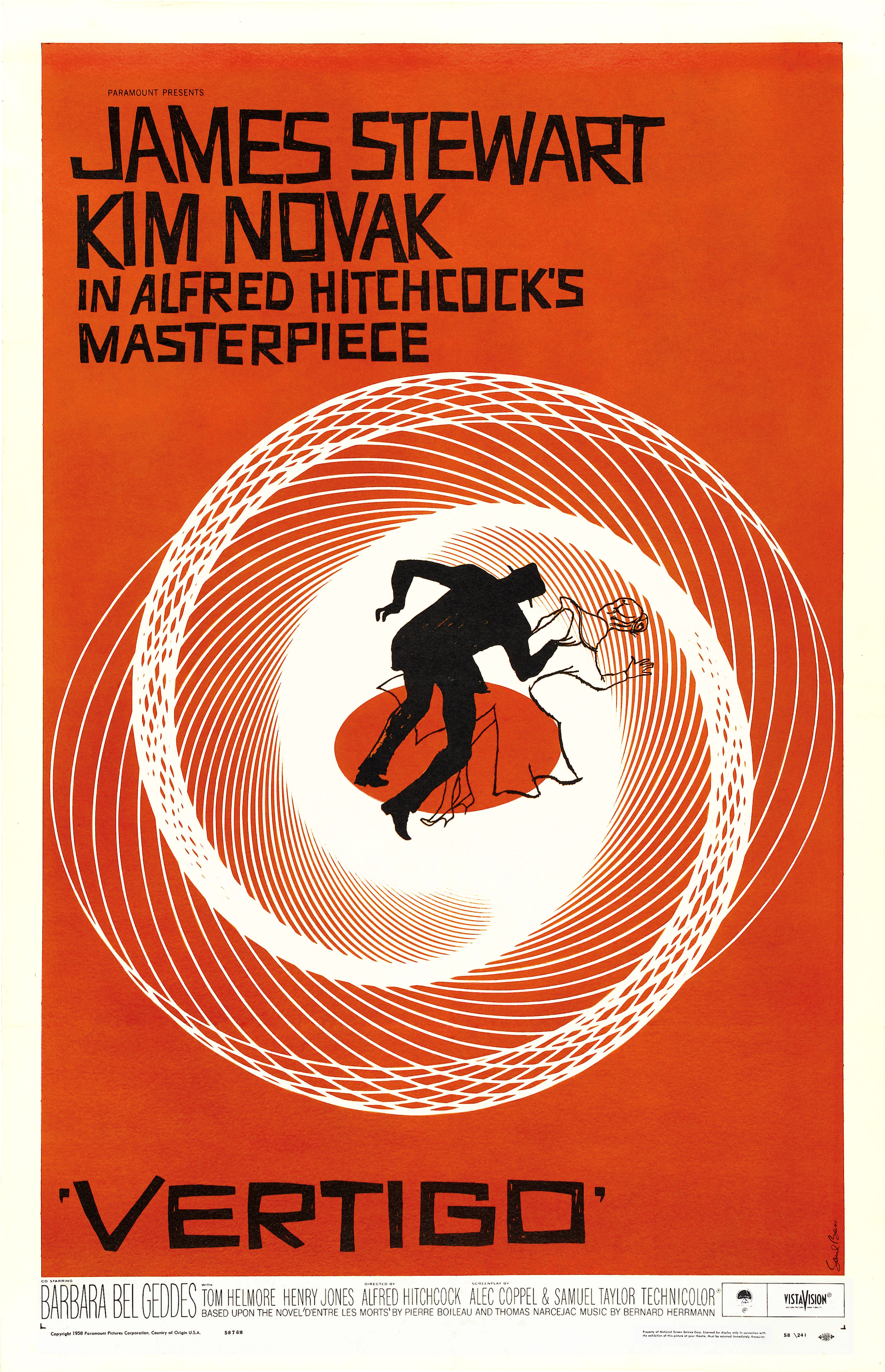
- Theatrical release poster by Saul Bass
- Directed by: Alfred Hitchcock
- Screenplay by: Alec Coppel; Samuel Taylor
- Based on: D'entre les morts by Pierre Boileau and Thomas Narcejac
- Produced by: Alfred Hitchcock
- Starring: James Stewart; Kim Novak; Barbara Bel Geddes; Tom Helmore; Henry Jones
- Cinematography: Robert Burks
- Edited by: George Tomasini
- Music by: Bernard Herrmann
- Production company: Alfred J. Hitchcock Productions
- Distributed by: Paramount Pictures (Note: After the film's release, Paramount transferred the distribution rights to Hitchcock's estate, where they were acquired by Universal Pictures in 1983.)
- Release date: May 9, 1958
- Running time: 128 minutes
- Country: United States
- Language: English
- Budget: $2.5 million
- Box office: $7.3 million

Vertigo is a 1958 American psychological thriller film produced and directed by Alfred Hitchcock. The story was based on the 1954 novel D'entre les morts (From Among the Dead) by Boileau-Narcejac, with a screenplay by Alec Coppel and Samuel A. Taylor. The film stars James Stewart as former San Francisco police detective John "Scottie" Ferguson, who has retired after an incident in the line of duty caused him to develop an extreme fear of heights accompanied by vertigo. He is hired as a private investigator to report on the strange behavior of an acquaintance's wife (Kim Novak).

The film was shot on location in San Francisco, as well as in Mission San Juan Bautista, Big Basin Redwoods State Park, Cypress Point on 17-Mile Drive, and at Paramount Studios in Hollywood. The film stock of the VistaVision camera negative was Eastman 25 ASA tungsten-balanced 5248 with processing and prints by Technicolor. It was the first film to use the dolly zoom, an in-camera effect that distorts perspective to create disorientation, to convey Scottie's acrophobia; the technique is often referred to as "the Vertigo effect" in reference to its use in the film. In 1996, the film underwent a major restoration to create a new 70 mm print and DTS soundtrack.

Vertigo received mixed reviews on release, but it has since come to be considered Hitchcock's magnum opus and one of the greatest films of all time. In 1989, it was one of the first 25 films selected by the Library of Congress for preservation in the United States National Film Registry for being "culturally, historically, or aesthetically significant". The film appears repeatedly in polls of the best films by the American Film Institute, including a 2007 ranking as the ninth-greatest American film ever. Attracting significant scholarly attention, it replaced Citizen Kane as the greatest film ever made in the 2012 Sight & Sound Greatest Films of All Time poll, and came in second place in the 2022 edition of the poll.

== Plot ==
San Francisco detective John "Scottie" Ferguson and a fellow policeman chase a crook on the roofs of several houses; Scottie slips and nearly falls. His colleague attempts to rescue Scottie, but falls to his death.

Some time later, Scottie has retired due to acrophobia and accompanying vertigo caused by the incident. Midge, his ex-fiancée, says that another severe emotional shock may be the only cure. Midge retains feelings for Scottie, but he is not receptive to her intimations.

Gavin Elster, an acquaintance from college, asks Scottie to follow his wife, Madeleine, claiming that she has been behaving strangely. Scottie follows Madeleine to the grave of Carlotta Valdes, who died in 1857, at the Mission San Francisco de Asís, and to the Legion of Honor art museum, where she gazes at the Portrait of Carlotta.

A local historian explains that Carlotta Valdes committed suicide: she had been the mistress of a wealthy married man and borne his child, and the otherwise childless man kept the child and cast her aside. Carlotta, who Gavin fears is possessing Madeleine, was Madeleine's great-grandmother. However, Madeleine does not know this or remember the places she has visited while ostensibly possessed. Scottie trails her to Fort Point and rescues her after she jumps into San Francisco Bay.

The next day, Madeleine stops to deliver a letter of gratitude to Scottie, and they spend the day together. They travel to Muir Woods and Cypress Point on 17-Mile Drive, where they embrace. The next day, Madeleine recounts a nightmare, and Scottie identifies its setting as Mission San Juan Bautista, Carlotta's childhood home. He drives her there, and they express their love for each other. Madeleine suddenly runs into the church and up the bell tower, asking Scottie not to follow her. Scottie runs after her, but is halted on the steps by his fear of heights and sees her plunge to her death.

An inquest into Madeleine's death declares it a suicide, though the coroner rebukes Scottie for not doing more to save her. Gavin also does not fault Scottie, but announces that he plans to leave the country. Scottie becomes clinically depressed and is sent to a sanatorium in an almost catatonic state. Following his release, he frequents the places that Madeleine visited, often imagining that he sees her. One day, he notices a woman on the street who, although superficially very different, reminds him of Madeleine. He follows her into her apartment, where she identifies herself as Judy Barton, from Salina, Kansas.

A flashback reveals that Judy was the person Scottie knew as "Madeleine Elster"; she had been impersonating Gavin's wife in an elaborate murder scheme. Gavin took advantage of Scottie's fear of heights to substitute his wife's freshly-killed body in the apparent suicide jump. Judy writes a note to Scottie confessing her involvement in the plot, but tears it up and decides to continue the charade because she loves him.

The two begin seeing each other, but Scottie remains obsessed with "Madeleine" and asks Judy to change her clothes and dye her hair to resemble her. After she complies, he notices her wearing the necklace portrayed in Carlotta's painting. Realizing the truth, he drives Judy back to the mission.

There, he tells her that he must re-enact the event that led to his madness, and that he now knows that "Madeleine" and Judy are the same person, with Judy having been Gavin's mistress before being cast aside just as Carlotta had been. He forces her up the bell tower and makes her admit her deceit. Judy confesses that Gavin paid her to impersonate a "possessed" Madeleine and begs Scottie to forgive her. He embraces Judy at the top of the tower, but a shadowy figure—a nun investigating the noise—rises from the tower's staircase, startling her. Judy lunges backward off the tower to her death. Scottie, bereaved once again but cured of his fear of heights, stands on the ledge in shock while the nun rings the mission bell.

== Cast ==
- James Stewart as John "Scottie" Ferguson
- Kim Novak as Judy Barton / Madeleine Elster
- Tom Helmore as Gavin Elster
- Barbara Bel Geddes as Marjorie "Midge" Wood
- Henry Jones as the coroner
- Raymond Bailey as Scottie's doctor
- Ellen Corby as the manager of the McKittrick Hotel
- Konstantin Shayne as bookstore owner Pop Leibel
- Lee Patrick as the car owner mistaken for Madeleine

Alfred Hitchcock makes his customary cameo appearance walking in front of Gavin Elster's shipyard, carrying a trumpet case.

== Themes and interpretations ==
In his monograph dedicated to the study of Vertigo, Charles Barr has stated that the central theme of the film is psychological obsession, concentrating in particular on Scottie as obsessed with the women in his life. Barr notes, "This story of a man who develops a romantic obsession with the image of an enigmatic woman has commonly been seen, by his colleagues as well as by critics and biographers, as one that engaged Hitchcock in an especially profound way; and it has exerted a comparable fascination on many of its viewers. After first seeing it as a teenager in 1958, Donald Spoto had gone back for 26 more viewings by the time he wrote The Art of Alfred Hitchcock in 1976. In a 1996 magazine article, Geoffrey O'Brien cites other cases of 'permanent fascination' with Vertigo, and then casually reveals that he himself, starting at age 15, has seen it 'at least thirty times'."

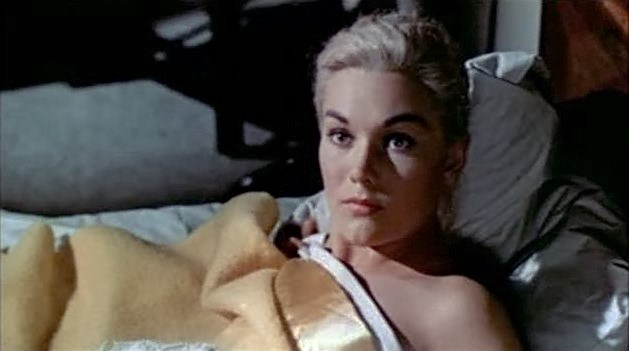
Novak as Madeleine, who wakes in Scottie's bed after apparently trying to drown herself

Critics have interpreted Vertigo variously as "a tale of male aggression and visual control; as a map of female Oedipal trajectory; as a deconstruction of the male construction of femininity and of masculinity itself; as a stripping bare of the mechanisms of directorial, Hollywood studio and colonial oppression; and as a place where textual meanings play out in an infinite regress of self-reflexivity." Critic James F. Maxfield has suggested that Vertigo can be interpreted as a variation on Ambrose Bierce's 1890 short story "An Occurrence at Owl Creek Bridge", in which the main narrative of the film is actually imagined by Scottie as he dangles from a building at the end of the opening rooftop chase.

== Production ==
=== Development ===
The screenplay of Vertigo is an adaptation of the 1954 French novel D'entre les morts (From Among the Dead) by Pierre Boileau and Thomas Narcejac. Hitchcock had attempted to buy the rights to the previous novel by the same authors, Celle qui n'était plus (She Who Was No More), but failed, and it was instead adapted by Henri-Georges Clouzot as Les Diaboliques. Although François Truffaut once suggested that D'entre les morts was specifically written for Hitchcock by Boileau and Narcejac, Narcejac subsequently denied that this was their intention. However, Hitchcock's interest in their work meant that Paramount Pictures commissioned a synopsis of D'entre les morts in 1954, before it had even been translated into English (it appeared in translation as The Living and the Dead in 1956).

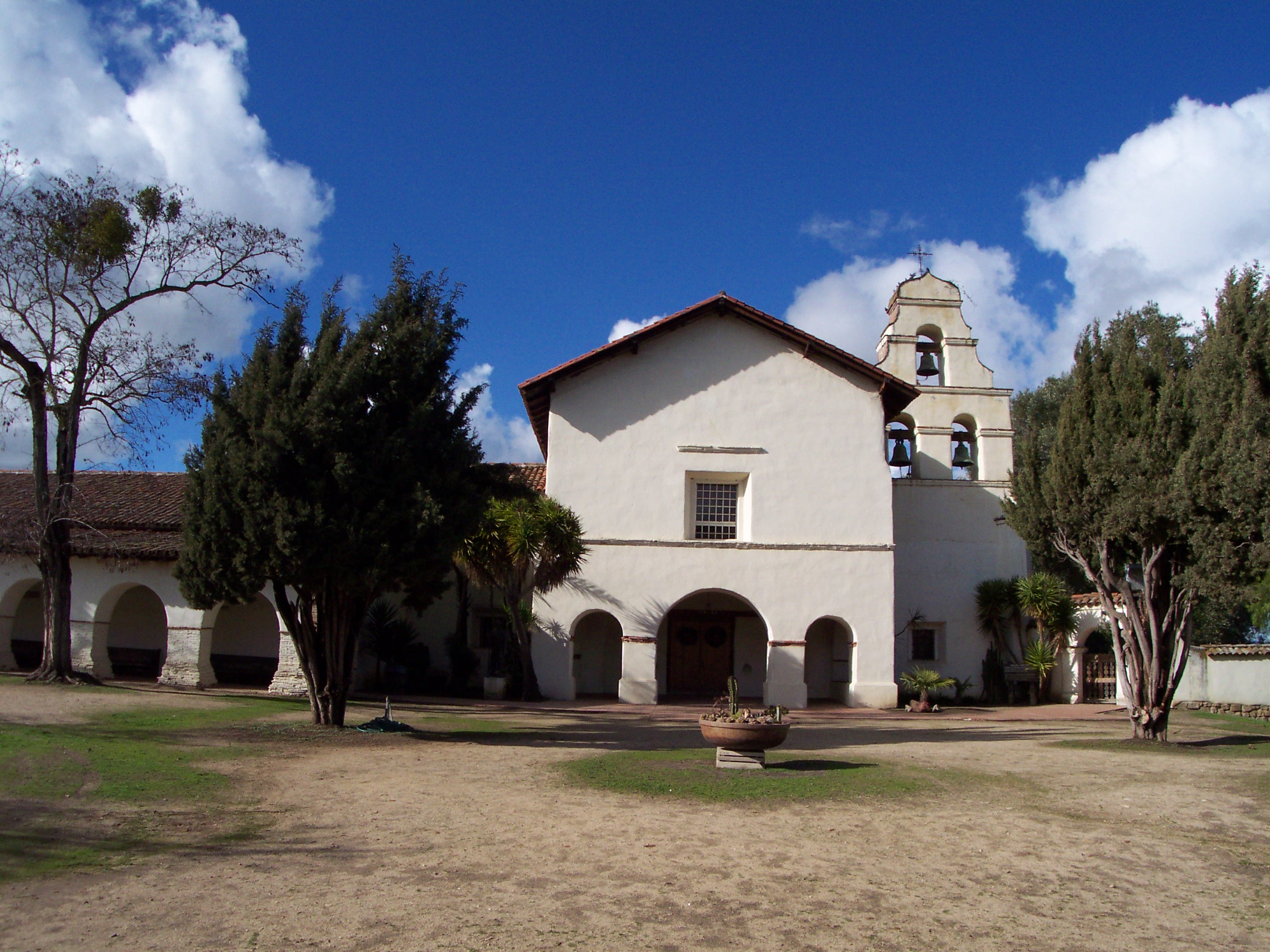
The scenes with Madeleine, and subsequently Judy, at Mission San Juan Bautista used the real Mission location with a much higher bell tower as a special effect.

In the book, Judy's involvement in Madeleine's death was not revealed until the denouement; at the scriptwriting stage, Hitchcock suggested revealing the secret two-thirds of the way through the film so that the audience would understand Judy's dilemma. After the first preview, Hitchcock was unsure whether or not to keep the "letter writing scene", though he subsequently decided to remove it. Herbert Coleman, Vertigo's associate producer and a frequent collaborator with Hitchcock, felt the removal was a mistake; however, Hitchcock said to "Release it just like that." James Stewart, acting as mediator, said to Coleman: "Herbie, you shouldn't get so upset with Hitch. The picture's not that important." Hitchcock's decision was supported by screenwriter Joan Harrison, another member of his circle, who felt that the film had been improved. Coleman reluctantly made the necessary edits. When Paramount head Barney Balaban received news of this, he ordered Hitchcock to "Put the picture back the way it was," ensuring that the scene remained in the final cut.

=== Writing ===
Three screenwriters were involved in the writing of Vertigo. Hitchcock originally hired playwright Maxwell Anderson to write a screenplay, but rejected his work, which was titled Darkling, I Listen (a quotation from John Keats's 1819 poem "Ode to a Nightingale"). According to Charles Barr in his monograph dedicated to Vertigo, "Anderson was the oldest (at 68) [of the three writers involved], the most celebrated for his stage work, and the least committed to cinema, though he had a joint script credit for Hitchcock's preceding film The Wrong Man. He worked on adapting the novel during Hitchcock's absence abroad, and submitted a treatment in September 1956."

A second version, written by Alec Coppel, again left the director dissatisfied. The final script was written by Samuel A. Taylor, who had been recommended to Hitchcock due to his knowledge of San Francisco, from notes by the director. Among Taylor's creations was the character of Midge. Taylor attempted to take sole credit for the screenplay, but Coppel protested to the Screen Writers Guild, which determined that both writers (but not Anderson) were entitled to a credit.

=== Casting ===
Vera Miles, who was under personal contract to Hitchcock and had appeared both on Alfred Hitchcock Presents and in The Wrong Man, was originally scheduled to play Madeleine, and modeled for an early version of the portrait of Carlotta. Following delays, including Hitchcock becoming ill with gallbladder problems, Miles became pregnant and had to withdraw from the role. The director declined to postpone shooting, and cast Kim Novak as Miles' replacement.

=== Filming ===
==== Initial on-site principal photography ====
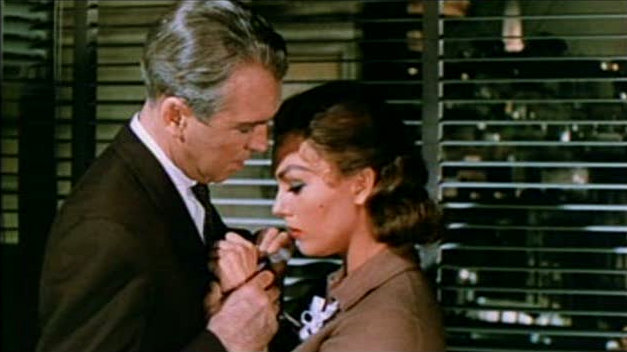
Scottie and Judy in Scottie's apartment, with Coit Tower visible through the window

Vertigo was filmed from September to December 1957. Principal photography began on location in San Francisco in September 1957 under the working title From Among the Dead. The film uses extensive location footage of the San Francisco Bay Area. In the driving scenes shot in San Francisco, the main characters' cars are almost always pictured heading down the city's steeply inclined streets.

The scene in which Madeleine falls from the tower was filmed at Mission San Juan Bautista, a Spanish mission in San Juan Bautista, California. Associate producer Herbert Coleman's daughter Judy Lanini suggested the mission to Hitchcock as a filming location. A steeple, added sometime after the mission's original construction and secularization, had been demolished following a fire, so Hitchcock added a bell tower much larger than the one previously at the mission using scale models, matte paintings, and trick photography at Paramount Studios.

===== List of shooting locations =====
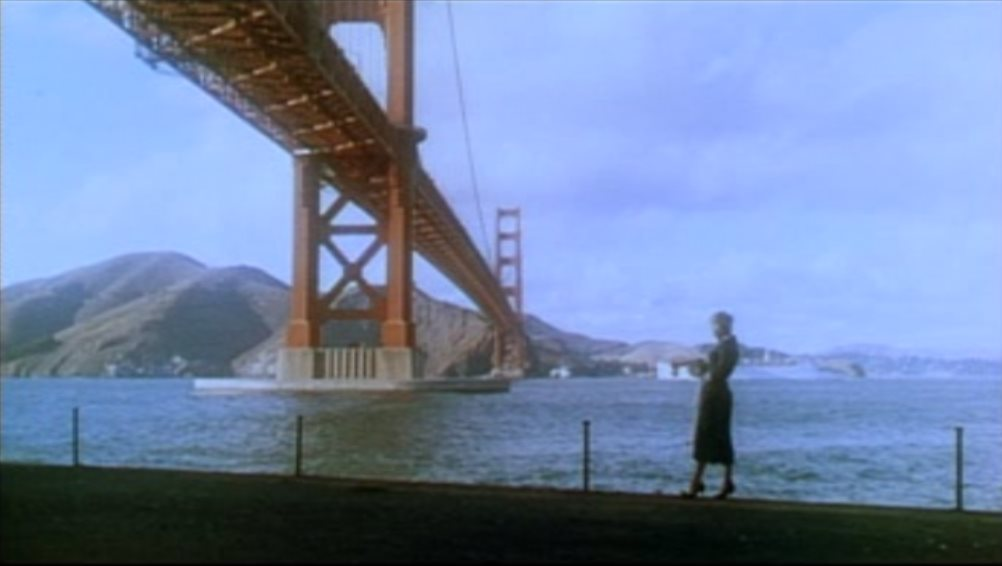
Madeleine at Fort Point beneath the Golden Gate Bridge

- Scottie's apartment (900 Lombard Street) is one block downhill from the "crookedest street in the world". The facade of the building remained mostly intact until 2012, when the owner of the property erected a wall enclosing the entrance area on the Lombard side of the building.
- The rooftop chase took place on Taylor Street between 1302 and 1360. 1308 Taylor Street went up for sale in 2016 for $2.2 million.
- The Mission San Juan Bautista, where Madeleine falls from the tower, is a real place, but the tower had to be matted in with a painting using studio effects; Hitchcock had first visited the mission before the tower was torn down due to dry rot, and was reportedly displeased to find it missing when he returned to film. The original tower was much smaller than the one depicted in the film.
- The Carlotta Valdes headstone featured in the film, created by the props department, was left at Mission Dolores. The headstone was later removed, as the mission considered it disrespectful to the dead. All other cemeteries in San Francisco had been evicted from the city limits in 1912, so the screenwriters had no other option but to locate the grave at Mission Dolores.
- Madeleine jumps into the bay at Fort Point, underneath the Golden Gate Bridge.
- The gallery where Carlotta's painting appears is the California Palace of the Legion of Honor in San Francisco. The Carlotta Valdes portrait was lost after being removed from the gallery, but many of the other paintings in the background of the portrait scenes are still on view.
- What purports to be Muir Woods National Monument in the film is in fact Big Basin Redwoods State Park; however, the cutaway of the redwood tree showing its age was copied from one that can still be found at Muir Woods.
- The coastal spot where Scottie and Madeleine first kiss is Sunset Point Overlook near Cypress Point on 17-Mile Drive in Pebble Beach. However, the lone tree they kiss next to was a prop brought specially to the location.
- The domed building Scottie and Judy walk past is the Palace of Fine Arts.
- Coit Tower appears in many background shots; Hitchcock once said that he included it as a phallic symbol. Also prominent in the background is the tower of the San Francisco Ferry Building.
- The exterior of the sanatorium where Scottie is treated was St. Joseph's Hospital, located at 355 Buena Vista Avenue East, across from Buena Vista Park. The hospital, which was not a sanatorium, was closed in 1979 and then converted into condominiums. The building, built in 1928, is on the National Register of Historic Places.
- Gavin and Madeleine's apartment building "The Brocklebank" at 1000 Mason Street on Nob Hill still looks essentially the same. It is across the street from the Fairmont Hotel, where Hitchcock usually stayed when he visited the city and where many of the cast and crew stayed during filming. Shots of the surrounding neighborhood feature the James C. Flood Mansion and Grace Cathedral. Barely visible is the Mark Hopkins Hotel, mentioned in an early scene in the movie.
- The "McKittrick Hotel" was a privately owned Victorian mansion from the 1880s at Gough and Eddy Streets. It was torn down in 1959, and the site is now an athletic practice field for Sacred Heart Cathedral Preparatory. St. Paulus Lutheran Church, seen across from the mansion, was destroyed in a fire in 1995.
- Podesta Baldocchi is the flower shop Madeleine visits as she is being followed by Scottie. The shop's location at the time of filming was 224 Grant Avenue; it has since moved to 410 Harriet Street.
- "The Empire Hotel", where Judy lives, is located at 940 Sutter Street. Judy's room was created on set, but the green neon of the "Hotel Empire" sign outside was based on the actual hotel's sign. Originally called the York Hotel, It was known as Hotel Vertigo from 2009 until it was renovated and renamed Hotel Julian in 2024; in order to retain a nod to the film, the hotel restaurant was renamed Carlotta's. (Note: Multiple sources:)
- Ernie's, where Scottie and Madeleine first meet, was a real restaurant at 847 Montgomery Street in Jackson Square, 1 mile (1.6 km) from Scottie's apartment. It closed in 1995. (Note: Multiple sources:)
- One short scene shows Union Square at dawn. Pop Leibel's bookstore, the Argosy, was not a real location, but one recreated on the Paramount lot in imitation of the real-life Argonaut Book Store, which still exists near Sutter and Jones.
- Elster's fictitious Dogpatch shipyard office was filmed at the real (or simulated with mattes) Union Iron Works shipyard, by then the Bethlehem Steel shipyard. Elster's office has a Mission telephone exchange (MI or 64) prefix, regarding which Midge says "Why, that's Skid Row".

==== Subsequent studio shooting ====
Following 16 days of location shooting, the production moved to Paramount's studios in Hollywood for two months of filming. Hitchcock preferred filming in the studio to location shooting, as he was able to control the environment there. Once sufficient location footage had been obtained, interior sets were designed and constructed in the studio.

Hitchcock popularized the dolly zoom in this film, leading to the technique being known as "the Vertigo effect" (among other nicknames). This method involves the camera physically moving away from a subject whilst simultaneously zooming in (Note: Some sources say that Vertigo uses dolly-in/zoom-out. The Obsessed with Vertigo DVD documentary says that the shot was achieved by "zooming forward and tracking backward simultaneously".) (or the reverse), so that the subject retains its size in the frame, but the background's perspective changes. Hitchcock used the effect to look down the tower shaft to emphasise its height and Scottie's disorientation. Following difficulties filming the shot on a full-sized set, a model of the tower shaft was constructed, and the dolly zoom was filmed horizontally. The "special sequence" (Scottie's nightmare sequence) was designed by artist John Ferren, who also created the painting of Carlotta. (Note: Multiple sources:)

The rotating patterns in the title sequence were created by animator John Whitney using a Kerrison Predictor, a mechanical computer which was used during World War II to aim anti-aircraft cannons at moving targets. This made it possible to produce an animated version of Lissajous curves.

=== Costume design ===
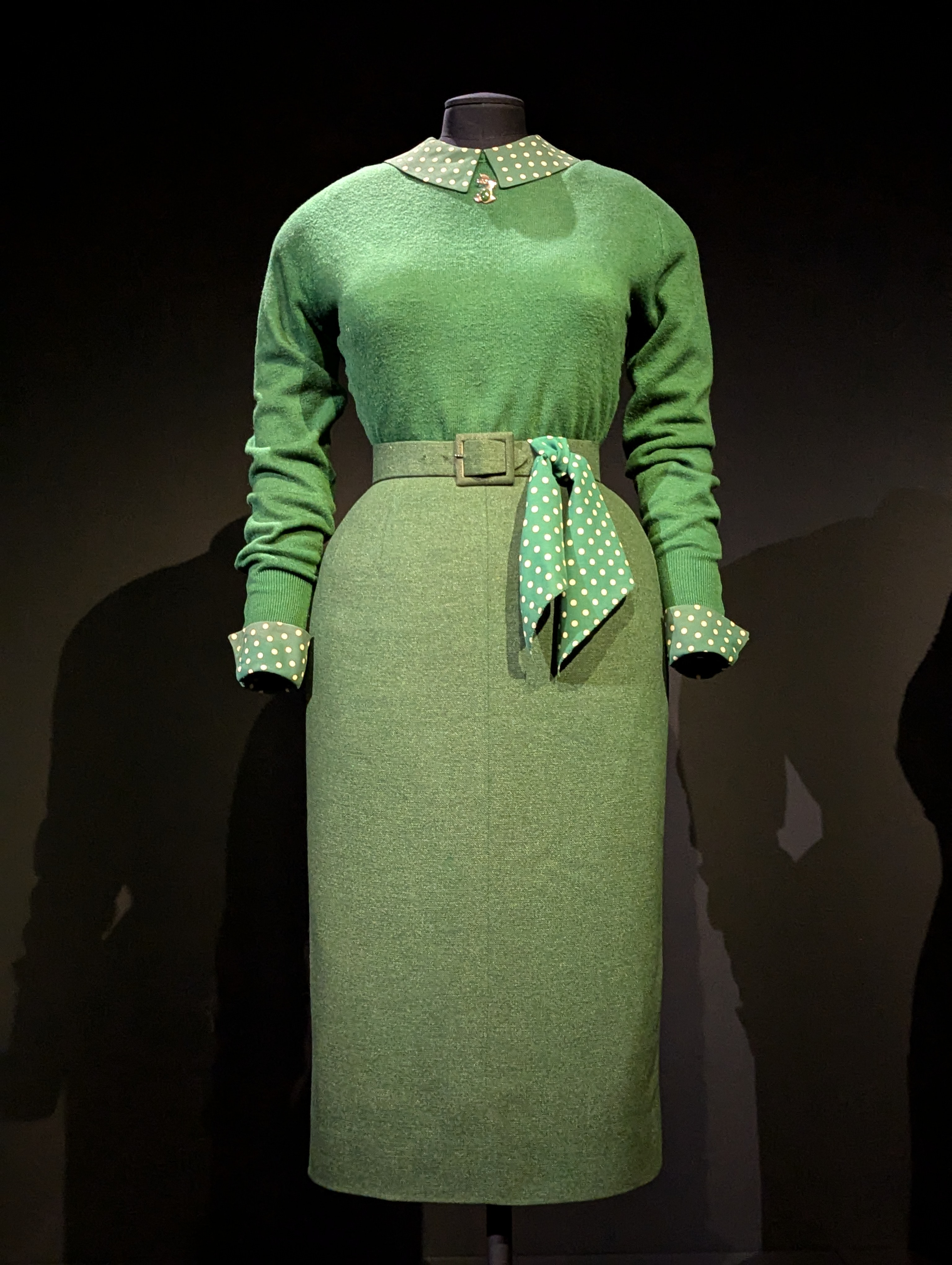
Costume worn by Judy Barton/Madeleine Elster (Kim Novak) in the film on display at the Academy Museum in Los Angeles, California.

Hitchcock and costume designer Edith Head used color to heighten emotion. Grey was chosen for Madeleine's suit in an attempt to be psychologically jarring, as it is not usually a blonde's color. In contrast, Novak's character wore a white coat when she visited Scottie's apartment, which Head and Hitchcock considered more natural for a blonde to wear.

=== Alternative ending ===
A coda to the film was shot that showed Midge at her apartment, listening to a radio report (voiced by San Francisco TV reporter Dave McElhatton) describing the pursuit of Gavin Elster across Europe. Midge switches the radio off when Scottie enters the room, and they then share a drink and look out of the window in silence. Contrary to reports that this scene was filmed to meet foreign censorship needs, this tag ending had originally been demanded by Geoffrey Shurlock of the U.S. Production Code Administration, who had noted: "It will, of course, be most important that the indication that Elster will be brought back for trial is sufficiently emphasized."

Hitchcock ultimately succeeded in fending off most of Shurlock's demands, including toning down erotic allusions, and had the alternative ending dropped. The footage was discovered in Los Angeles in May 1993, and was added as an alternative ending on LaserDisc, DVD, and Blu-ray releases of the film.

=== Music ===
The film's score was written by regular Hitchcock collaborator Bernard Herrmann. It was conducted by Muir Mathieson and recorded in London and Vienna because of a musicians' strike in the United States. The score extensively references Richard Wagner's opera Tristan und Isolde; according to critic Alex Ross, this "is a matter of deliberation and subtlety. The main melodic contour is [Herrmann's] own; the harmony is still his idiosyncratic construction. He is jogging the memory of those who know 'Tristan' and the subconscious of those who don't. His veiled citations indicate in their own way the unstoppable recurrence of the past...the score is not an illustration of the film but a metaphor for it."

In a 2004 special issue of the British Film Institute's magazine Sight and Sound, director Martin Scorsese described the qualities of Herrmann's score:

Hitchcock's film is about obsession, which means that it's about circling back to the same moment, again and again... And the music is also built around spirals and circles, fulfillment and despair. Herrmann really understood what Hitchcock was going for — he wanted to penetrate to the heart of obsession.

=== Graphic design ===
Graphic designer Saul Bass used spiral motifs in both the title sequence and the movie poster, emphasizing what the documentary Obsessed with Vertigo calls the film's "psychological vortex". Bass's unconventional framing of actress Audrey Lowell's facial features in the first images of the titles was indebted to Bauhaus photography. According to her 1997 Guardian interview, Kim Novak wanted to do the opening title sequence but Harry Cohn insisted Hitchcock pay full rate for the single day's shooting and so another face was chosen.

== Release ==
Vertigo premiered in San Francisco on May 9, 1958, at the Stage Door Theater (now the August Hall nightclub). While Vertigo did break even upon its original release, earning $3.2 million in North American distributor rentals against its $2,479,000 cost, it earned significantly less than other Hitchcock productions.

=== Restoration and re-release ===
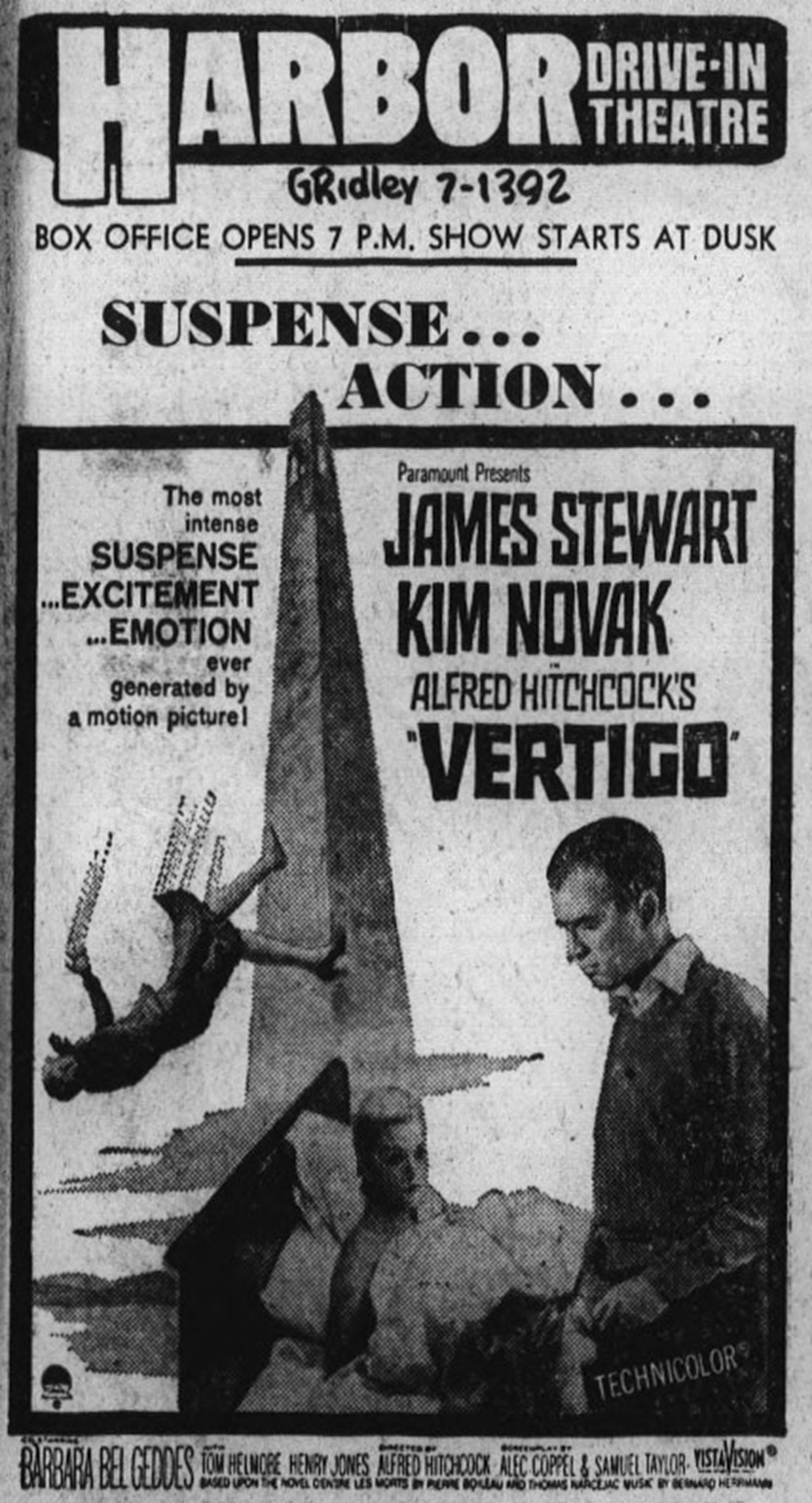
Drive-in advertisement from 1958

In October 1983, Rear Window and Vertigo were the first two Hitchcock films to be reissued by Universal Pictures after the studio acquired the rights from the director's estate. These two films – along with The Man Who Knew Too Much (1956), Rope (1948), and The Trouble with Harry (1955) – had been kept out of distribution by the director since 1968. Cleaning and restoration were performed on each film when new 35 mm prints were struck.

In October 1996, the restored print of Vertigo debuted at the Castro Theatre in San Francisco with a live on-stage introduction by Kim Novak. Visiting the San Francisco film locations has accrued modest tourist appeal; such a tour is featured in a subsection of Chris Marker's 1983 documentary montage Sans Soleil.

In 1996, the film was given a lengthy and controversial restoration by Robert A. Harris and James C. Katz and re-released to theaters. The new print featured restored color and newly created audio, using modern sound effects mixed in DTS digital surround sound. In October 1996, the restored Vertigo premiered at the Castro Theatre in San Francisco, with Kim Novak and Patricia Hitchcock attending. At this screening, the film was exhibited for the first time in DTS and 70mm, a format with a similar frame size to the VistaVision system in which it was originally shot.

Significant color correction was necessary because of the fading of original negatives. In some cases a new negative was created from the silver separation masters, but in many instances this was impossible because of differential separation shrinkage, and because the 1958 separations were poorly made. Separations used three individual films: one for each of the primary colors. In the case of Vertigo, these had shrunk in different and erratic proportions, making re-alignment impossible.

As a result, significant amounts of computer assisted coloration were necessary. Although the results are not noticeable on viewing the film, some elements were as many as eight generations away from the original negative, in particular the entire "Judy's Apartment" sequence. When such large portions of re-creation become necessary, then the danger of artistic license by the restorers becomes an issue, and the restorers received some criticism for their re-creation of colors that allegedly did not honor the director's and cinematographer's intentions. The restoration team argued that they did research on the colors used in the original locations, cars, wardrobe, and skin tones. One breakthrough came when the Ford Motor Company supplied a well-preserved green paint sample for a car used in the film. As the color green has extensive symbolic use in the film, matching a shade of green was important for restoration and provided a reference shade.

When restoring the sound, Harris and Katz wanted to stay as close as possible to the original, and had access to the original music recordings that had been stored in the vaults at Paramount. However, as the project demanded a new 6-channel DTS soundtrack, it was necessary to re-record some sound effects. The soundtrack was remixed at the Alfred Hitchcock Theatre at Universal Studios. Aware that the film had a considerable following, the restoration team knew that they were under particular pressure to restore the film as accurately as possible. To achieve this, they used Hitchcock's original dubbing notes for guidance of how the director wanted the film to sound. Harris and Katz sometimes added extra sound effects to camouflage "hisses, pops, and bangs" in the old soundtrack; in particular, they added extra seagull cries and a foghorn to the scene at Cypress Point.

=== Home media ===
Original theatrical trailer for Vertigo (1958)

In 1996, director Harrison Engle produced the documentary Obsessed with Vertigo. Narrated by Roddy McDowall, the film played on American Movie Classics, and has since been included with DVD versions of Vertigo. Surviving members of the cast and crew participated, along with Martin Scorsese and Patricia Hitchcock. Engle first visited the Vertigo shooting locations in the summer of 1958, just months after completion of the film.

Vertigo was first released on DVD in March 1998. On October 4, 2011, the film was re-issued on DVD by Universal Pictures Home Entertainment as part of the Alfred Hitchcock: The Essentials Collection. Subsequently, the film was released on Blu-ray on September 25, 2012, as part of the Alfred Hitchcock: The Masterpiece Collection. In May 2014, the film was re-released as a stand-alone Blu-ray edition. Some home video releases, such as the 2005 Hitchcock Masterpiece Collection DVD set, contain the original mono track as an option.

In October 2014, a new 4K restoration was premiered at the Castro Theatre. This version gives credit to Harris and Katz at the end of the film and thanks them for providing some previously unknown stereo soundtracks. It removed some of the "excessive" Foley sounds that were added in the 1996 restoration.

In September 2020, an Ultra HD Blu-ray was released by Universal Pictures Home Entertainment as a part of the first volume of The Alfred Hitchcock Classics Collection. In September 2021, a stand-alone version was released alongside a SteelBook.

== Reception ==
=== Contemporaneous reception ===
Initial critical reception for Vertigo was mixed. Variety wrote that the film showed Hitchcock's "mastery", but felt it was "too long and slow" for "what is basically only a psychological murder mystery". Similarly, Philip K. Scheuer of the Los Angeles Times admired the scenery, but found that the plot took "too long to unfold" and "bogs down in a maze of detail". Scholar Dan Auiler says that this review "sounded the tone that most popular critics would take with the film". However, the Los Angeles Examiner loved it, admiring the "excitement, action, romance, glamor and [the] crazy, off-beat love story".

The New York Times film critic Bosley Crowther gave Vertigo qualified praise: "[the] secret [of the film] is so clever, even though it is devilishly far-fetched." Richard L. Coe of The Washington Post praised the film as a "wonderful weirdie," writing that "Hitchcock has even more fun than usual with trick angles, floor shots and striking use of color. More than once he gives us critical scenes in long shots establishing how he's going to get away with a couple of story tricks." John McCarten of The New Yorker wrote derisively that Hitchcock had "never before indulged in such farfetched nonsense."

The New York Post review echoed many critics': "Let's admit it right now. Hitchcock's surfaces are so smooth he thinks he can get away with murder in the logic and realism departments. If you want to tear 'Vertigo' apart, it rips easily. On the other hand, there's no denying that James Stewart's unactorish acting carries a heavy air of reality into the picture, and Kim Novak's somnambulistic behavior, called for by the script, is something she can do to perfection....It's doubtful that 'Vertigo' can take equal rank with the best of the Hitchcock studies—it has too many holes—but it assays high in visual confectionary of place, person, and celluloid wiles."

Contemporaneous response in England was summarized by Charles Barr in his monograph on Vertigo: "In England, the reception was if anything rather less friendly. Of the 28 newspaper and magazine reviews that I have looked at, six are, with reservations, favourable, nine are very mixed, and 13 almost wholly negative. Common to all of these reviews is a lack of sympathy with the basic structure and drive of the picture. Even the friendlier ones single out for praise elements that seem, from today's perspective, to be marginal virtues and incidental pleasures – the 'vitality' of the supporting performances (Dilys Powell in The Sunday Times), the slickness with which the car sequences are put together (Isobel Quibley in The Spectator)".

In France, Éric Rohmer noted in the film journal Cahiers du Cinéma that "Vertigo, so they say, repelled Americans. French critics, on the contrary, seem to be giving it a warm welcome." Praising the film's formal technique, he wrote that "ideas and forms follow the same road, and it is because the form is pure, beautiful, rigorous, astonishingly rich, and free that we can say that Hitchcock's films, with Vertigo at their head, are about ideas, in the noble, platonic sense of the word."

Hitchcock fans were not pleased with Vertigo's departure from the romantic-thriller territory of earlier films, or with the mystery being solved well before the film's ending. Orson Welles disliked the film, telling Henry Jaglom that it was "worse" than Rear Window, which he had also disliked. In an interview with François Truffaut, Hitchcock stated that Vertigo was one of his favourite films, with some reservations. He blamed the film's limited success on the 49-year-old Stewart looking too old to play a convincing love interest for the 24-year-old Novak.

A young Martin Scorsese viewed the film with his friends during its original theatrical run, and later recalled that "even though the film was not well received at the time... we responded to the film very strongly. [We] didn't know why... but we really went with the picture."

The film received awards at the San Sebastián International Film Festival, including a Silver Seashell for Best Director for Hitchcock (tied with Mario Monicelli for Big Deal on Madonna Street) and Best Actor for Stewart (tied with Kirk Douglas in The Vikings). The film was nominated for two technical Academy Awards for Best Art Direction – Black-and-White or Color (Hal Pereira, Henry Bumstead, Samuel M. Comer, Frank McKelvy) and Best Sound (George Dutton).

=== Re-evaluation ===
Over time the film has been re-evaluated by film critics and has moved higher in esteem in most critics' opinions. Vertigo did not place in the top ten of the British Film Institute magazine Sight and Sound decennial critics' poll of the greatest films of all time in either 1962 or 1972. It first entered the list in 1982, after Hitchcock's death, ranking seventh. By 1992 it had advanced to fourth place, by 2002 to second, and in 2012 to first place in both the crime genre and overall, ahead of previous first-place entry Citizen Kane; in the 2022 poll, it took second place behind Jeanne Dielman, 23 quai du Commerce, 1080 Bruxelles. In the 2012 Sight & Sound director's poll of the greatest films ever made Vertigo was ranked seventh; In the 2002 and 2022 editions of the directors' list the film ranked sixth.

Commenting upon the 2012 results, the magazine's editor Nick James said that Vertigo was "the ultimate critics' film. It is a dream-like film about people who are not sure who they are but who are busy reconstructing themselves and each other to fit a kind of cinema ideal of the ideal soul-mate." In recent years, critics have noted that the casting of Stewart as a character who becomes disturbed and obsessive ultimately enhances the film's unconventionality and suspense, since Stewart had previously been known for warmhearted roles.

In 1998, Time Out conducted a poll in which Vertigo was voted the fifth greatest film of all time. The Village Voice ranked Vertigo at No. 3 in its Top 250 "Best Films of the Century" list in 1999, based on a poll of critics. Entertainment Weekly voted it the 19th Greatest film of all time in 1999. In January 2002, the film was included on the list of the "Top 100 Essential Films of All Time" by the National Society of Film Critics. In 2009, the film was ranked at No. 10 on Japanese film magazine Kinema Junpo's Top 10 Non-Japanese Films of All Time list. In 2022, Time Out magazine ranked the film at No.15 on their list of "The 100 best thriller films of all time".

Already in the 1960s, Cahiers du Cinéma critics had begun re-evaluating Hitchcock as a serious artist. The film ranked eighth on Cahiers du Cinéma's Top 10 Films of the Year List in 1959. However, even François Truffaut's 1962 book of interviews with Hitchcock devotes only a few pages to Vertigo. Dan Auiler has suggested that the real beginning of Vertigo's re-evaluation was the 1968 publication of British-Canadian scholar Robin Wood's book Hitchcock's Films, which called it "Hitchcock's masterpiece to date and one of the four or five most profound and beautiful films the cinema has yet given us".

Adding to its mystique was the fact that Vertigo was one of five Hitchcock-owned films removed from circulation in 1973. When Vertigo was re-released in theaters in October 1983, and then on home video in October 1984, it achieved commercial success and laudatory reviews. The October 1996 showing of a restored print on 70 mm film with DTS sound at the Castro Theatre in San Francisco was met with a similarly strong reception. In his 1996 review of the film, critic Roger Ebert gave it four stars out of four and included it in his list of The Great Movies.

A minority of critics have expressed dissenting opinions. In his 2004 book Blockbuster, British film critic Tom Shone suggested that Vertigo's critical re-evaluation has led to excessive praise: "Hitchcock is a director who delights in getting his plot mechanisms buffed up to a nice humming shine, and so the Sight and Sound team praise the one film of his in which this is not the case – it's all loose ends and lopsided angles, its plumbing out on display for the critic to pick over at his leisure."

In 1989, Vertigo was recognized as a "culturally, historically and aesthetically significant" film by the United States Library of Congress and selected for preservation in the National Film Registry in the first year of the registry's voting.

In 2005, Vertigo was ranked at number two in Total Film magazine's 100 Greatest Movies of All Time, behind only Goodfellas. In 2008, an Empire poll of readers, actors, and critics named it the 40th greatest movie ever made. The film was voted at No. 8 on the 2008 list of "100 Greatest Films" by Cahiers du Cinéma. In 2010, The Guardian ranked it as the third-best crime film of all time. Vertigo ranked third on the BBC's 2015 list of the 100 greatest American films.

On review aggregator Rotten Tomatoes, the film holds an approval rating of 93% based on 98 reviews, with an average rating of 8.90/10. The website's critics' consensus deems it "an unpredictable scary thriller that doubles as a mournful meditation on love, loss, and human comfort". As of February 2024, Vertigo is one of only fourteen films with a perfect score on Metacritic (two other Hitchcock films, Notorious and Rear Window, are also on the list).

The most recent edition of the American Film Institute's top 100 films of all time, released in 2007, placed Vertigo at number nine, up 52 positions from its placement at number 61 in the original 1998 list.

American Film Institute recognition

- AFI's 100 Years...100 Movies (1998) #61
- AFI's 100 Years...100 Thrills (2001) #18
- AFI's 100 Years...100 Passions (2002) #18
- AFI's 100 Years of Film Scores (2005) #12
- AFI's 100 Years...100 Movies (10th Anniversary Edition) (2007) #9
- AFI's 10 Top 10 (2008) #1 Mystery

The San Francisco locations have become celebrated amongst the film's fans, with organized tours across the area. (Note: Such a tour is featured in a subsection of Chris Marker's documentary montage Sans Soleil.) In March 1997, the French magazine Les Inrockuptibles published a special issue about Vertigo's locations in San Francisco, Dans le décor.

Directors Martin Scorsese and Denis Villeneuve have listed Vertigo as among their favorite films of all time.

The renewed public appreciation for Vertigo is accompanied by a growing body of academic scholarship. Conferences like the Annual International Vertigo conference, for instance, showcase this trend, as evidenced by its 2018 event at Trinity College Dublin.

=== Critical works on Vertigo ===
- Robin Wood's chapter on Vertigo in Hitchcock's Films (1965)
- Molly Haskell's essay "With Paintbrush and Mirror: 'Vertigo' & 'As You Desire Me'" (1971) in The Village Voice
- Laura Mulvey's essay "Visual Pleasure and Narrative Cinema" (1973), which popularized the concept of the male gaze

=== Classification as film noir ===
Critical opinion is divided on whether or not Vertigo should be considered an example of film noir. Some consider it a film noir on the basis of plot, tone, and various motifs, despite it having mid-century modern visuals typical of the 1950s. Others say the use of Technicolor, color-based symbolism, and the specificity of Hitchcock's vision exclude it from the category. Nicholas Christopher, Robert Ottoson, and Silver and Ward, for instance, do not include Vertigo in their filmographies of film noir. By contrast, Foster Hirsch describes Vertigo as among the Hitchcock films that are "richly, demonstrably noir".

== Derivative works ==
- Kalangarai Vilakkam by K. Shankar is a 1965 Tamil adaptation of Vertigo.
- One on Top of the Other, a 1969 giallo film directed by Lucio Fulci, is heavily influenced by Vertigo.
- Obsession, a 1976 film by Brian De Palma, is heavily influenced by Vertigo, while his 1984 film Body Double combines the plot elements of both Vertigo and Rear Window.
- High Anxiety, a 1977 film by Mel Brooks, is a parody of several Hitchcock films, but leans on Vertigo in particular.
- Chris Marker's 1983 video essay Sans Soleil makes reference to the movie, declaring it the only film "capable of portraying impossible memory" over footage of Vertigo's shooting locations and stills from the film.
- Harvey Danger's song "Carlotta Valdez", from their 1997 album Where Have All the Merrymakers Gone?, summarizes the plot of the film.
- David Lynch's films Lost Highway (1997) and Mulholland Drive (2001) are reportedly influenced by Vertigo. Twin Peaks, a television series co-created by Lynch and Mark Frost, is also heavily inspired by Vertigo, particularly in the Doppelgänger character of Maddy Ferguson and various surrealist elements.
- Joseph Kahn's music video for Faith No More's 1997 song "Last Cup of Sorrow" is a parody of Vertigo, featuring Faith No More frontman Mike Patton as Scottie and actress Jennifer Jason Leigh as Madeleine/Judy.
- Suzhou River, a 2000 Chinese film by Lou Ye which critics saw as an homage to Vertigo.
- "Bad Romance", a 2009 song by Lady Gaga, includes the lyric "I want your Psycho, your Vertigo shtick", referencing Hitchcock's Psycho and Vertigo.
- The Testament of Judith Barton, a 2012 novel by Wendy Powers and Robin McLeod, tells the backstory of Judy Barton.
- The lyric video for "Look What You Made Me Do" (2017) by Taylor Swift, co-produced by Kahn, pays homage to Saul Bass' designs for the film's poster and opening credits, with the use of a similar font and spiral motifs.
- Alfred Hitchcock – Vertigo, a 2021 adventure video game by developer Pendulo Studios and publisher Microids, contains a plot inspired by but not directly adapted from the film.

== Potential remake ==
In March 2023, it was reported that Paramount Pictures had acquired the remake rights to the film instead of Universal, with Steven Knight set to write the script and Robert Downey Jr. set to star. When asked about the project in an interview in March 2025, Knight stated that the script was "swirling around in my head as we speak."

== See also ==
- Alfred Hitchcock filmography
- Cinema of the United States
- List of American films of 1958
- List of cult films

== Sources ==
- Auiler, Dan (1999). Vertigo: The Making of a Hitchcock Classic. London: Titan Books.
- Auiler, Dan (2000). Vertigo: The Making of a Hitchcock Classic. Macmillan. ISBN 978-0-312-26409-3.
- Barr, Charles (2002). Vertigo. London, England: BFI. ISBN 978-0-85170-918-5.
- Canning, Bob (2010). Block, Alex Ben; Wilson, Lucy Autrey (eds.). George Lucas's Blockbusting: A Decade-By-Decade Survey of Timeless Movies Including Untold Secrets of Their Financial and Cultural Success. HarperCollins. ISBN 978-0-06-177889-6.
- Eliot, Marc (2006). Jimmy Stewart: a biography. Harmony Books. ISBN 978-1-4000-5221-9.
- Hyder, Paul (2018). HITCHCOCK'S VERTIGO: A Personal Journey Through the Greatest Film Ever Made. Independently published. ISBN 979-8670236461.
- Kraft, Jeff; Leventhal, Aaron (2002). Footsteps in the Fog: Alfred Hitchcock's San Francisco. Santa Monica Press. ISBN 978-1-891661-27-3.
- Jones, Dan (2002). The Dime Novel and the Master of Suspense: The Adaptation of D'Entre Les Morts Into Vertigo. Saint Paul, Minn.: University of St. Thomas.
- Klein, Richard B. (2005). Coles, Felice Anne (ed.). In memory of Richard B. Klein: essays in contemporary philology. Romance Monographs, University of Mississippi.
- Lev, Peter (2006). Transforming the Screen, 1950–1959. Vol. 7 of History of the American Cinema. University of California Press. ISBN 978-0-520-24966-0.
- Mamer, Bruce (2008). Film Production Technique: Creating the Accomplished Image (5th ed.). Cengage Learning. ISBN 978-0-495-41116-1.
- McGilligan, Patrick (2003). Alfred Hitchcock: A Life in Darkness and Light. ReganBooks.
- Monaco, Paul (2010). A History of American Movies: A Film-By-Film Look at the Art, Craft, and Business of Cinema. Scarecrow Press. ISBN 978-0-8108-7434-3.
- Parish, James Robert (2008). It's Good to Be the King: The Seriously Funny Life of Mel Brooks. John Wiley & Sons. ISBN 978-0-470-22526-4.
- Shipka, Danny (2011). Perverse Titillation: The Exploitation Cinema of Italy, Spain and France, 1960–1980 (illustrated ed.). McFarland & Company. ISBN 978-0-7864-4888-3.
- Shone, Tom (2004). Blockbuster: How Hollywood Learned to Stop Worrying and Love the Summer. Simon & Schuster. ISBN 978-0-7432-6838-7.
- Sipos, Tomas M. (2010). Horror Film Aesthetics: Creating The Visual Language of Fear. McFarland. ISBN 978-0-7864-4972-9.
- Spinks, Randall (2017). "The Hallucinatory (Cultural) Logic of Hitchcock's Vertigo". Quarterly Review of Film and Video. 34 (3): 212–242. doi:10.1080/10509208.2016.1222571. S2CID 193454124.
- Truffaut, François; Hitchcock, Alfred (1985). Hitchcock. New York: Simon and Schuster. OCLC 273102.
- Moldes, Diego (2004). La huella de Vértigo. Madrid: Ediciones JC. ISBN 978-8489564398.
