= Arrive Alive =

1991 American unfinished comedy film

- Directed by: Jeremiah S. Chechik
- Written by: Michael O'Donoghue; Mitch Glazer
- Produced by: Art Linson
- Starring: Willem Dafoe; Joan Cusack
- Distributed by: Paramount Pictures
- Release date: 1991 (intended)
- Country: United States
- Language: English

Arrive Alive is an unfinished comedy film directed by Jeremiah S. Chechik and starring Willem Dafoe and Joan Cusack. It was produced by Art Linson.

== Premise ==
Mickey Crews is a house detective in a seedy Florida hotel who gets involved in investigating the death of a former champion boxer. He has a romance with a former exotic dancer named Joy.

== Background ==
The script was written by Mitch Glazer and Michael O'Donoghue who had written Scrooged (1988) for producer Art Linson. Linson had tried to get Arrive Alive made for a number of years, with a variety of stars attached, before finally securing funding with Chechik, Dafoe and Cusack. Cusack was a featured player on Saturday Night Live from 1985-1986, Dafoe was already famous from Platoon and The Last Temptation of Christ and Chechik had just directed National Lampoon's Christmas Vacation.

Filming started in April 1990. However, after a week, the producers felt that the lines they had thought funny were not getting the laughs they hoped for. Shortly after arriving for shooting in Miami, Dafoe quit due to script changes which required him to perform slapstick comedy which did not suit him. Six days later, the decision was taken to cancel production as no satisfactory replacement could be found for Dafoe and write off the $7 million cost. The story is related in Linson's book A Pound of Flesh.

Various attempts have been made to film the script again without any success.

The orca Lolita was to appear in the film but production was halted while filming at the Miami Seaquarium.
