= Rossi & Rovetti =

Florist Company based in San Francisco

Rossi & Rovetti Flower Delivery is a long-running florist's company based in San Francisco. The origins of the company Pelicano Rossi Flowers dates back to 1900, when a man named A. Pelicano, an immigrant from Italy, started a business selling fresh flowers to merchants and passers-by in the new city of San Francisco. Joining with A. Rossi, another Italian immigrant, the earliest printed recognition of his business can be found in the Walter S. Fry 1907 annual directory of two cities.

In 1915, the company celebrated the Liberty Bell with one of the largest moving floats created by a florist at that time. In 1919, San Francisco mayor Angelo Rossi became the second generation of the Rossi family to be a part of the floral business.

In 1958, half of the floral business was sold to a French-Italian immigrant, Vincent Rovetti. In 1958, he bought half-ownership in the Rossi flower shop. He already had extensive experience in the flower business as assistant store manager of two large floral shops on the West Coast --Belli and Belli Flowers and Podesta Baldocchi Flowers. In 1964, Rovetti bought out his partner and renamed it to its present title. Rovetti died following a freak accident in 1997, when an automatic revolving door at the San Francisco Marriott apparently failed to stop when Rovetti paused while walking through it. His son Marc took over the family business and also sold the last remaining Rossi & Rovetti floral shop to Jason C. Braatz and his family in 2003.
