= Tom Shone =

American film critic and writer

Tom Shone is a film critic and writer. He was educated in the UK and went to Varndean VIth form college in Brighton, Sussex. He was the Sunday Times film critic from 1994 to 1999 and has written for Vogue, Slate, the New Yorker, the New York Times and The Guardian.

He is the author of Blockbuster: How Hollywood Learned to Stop Worrying and Love the Summer, published in 2004 by Simon & Schuster. The book is an analysis of the Hollywood blockbuster phenomenon driven chiefly by Steven Spielberg and George Lucas in the 1970s, based on interviews with these and other filmmakers. Shone's first novel, In the Rooms was published in the U.K. by Hutchinson on July 2, 2009, and in the U.S. by St Martin's Press in 2011. He also wrote the books Martin Scorsese: A Retrospective and Woody Allen: A retrospective, published in 2014 and 2015.

Shone collaborated with Christopher Nolan for an in-depth look at the filmmaker's work, called The Nolan Variations: The Movies, Mysteries, and Marvels of Christopher Nolan (2020). Library Journal wrote in their review that "this is the definitive word on Nolan and a must for film buffs." Neal Gabler called the book "intelligent, illuminating, rigorous, and highly readable. The very model of what a filmmaking study should be. Essential reading for anyone who cares about Nolan or about film for that matter."
