= Diabolique (1996 film) =

- Theatrical release poster
- Directed by: Jeremiah Chechik
- Screenplay by: Henri-Georges Clouzot; Don Roos
- Based on: She Who Was No More (Celle qui n'était plus); 1952 novel by Boileau-Narcejac
- Produced by: James G. Robinson; Marvin Worth
- Starring: Sharon Stone; Isabelle Adjani; Chazz Palminteri; Kathy Bates; Spalding Gray; Allen Garfield; Adam Hann-Byrd
- Cinematography: Peter James
- Edited by: Carol Littleton
- Music by: Randy Edelman
- Production company: Morgan Creek Productions
- Distributed by: Warner Bros.
- Release date: March 22, 1996
- Running time: 107 minutes
- Country: United States
- Language: English
- Budget: $30–40 million
- Box office: $52.5 million

Diabolique is a 1996 American psychological thriller film directed by Jeremiah Chechik, starring Sharon Stone, Isabelle Adjani, Chazz Palminteri, and Kathy Bates. The plot follows the wife and mistress of an abusive schoolmaster who find themselves stalked by an unknown assailant after murdering the schoolmaster and disposing of his body.

A remake of the French film Les Diaboliques (1955) directed by Henri-Georges Clouzot, it is based on the novel She Who Was No More by Boileau-Narcejac. Don Roos adapted the screenplay while Clouzot received credit for his original screenplay that he had collaborated on with others. Diabolique was produced by Morgan Creek Productions and released by Warner Bros. on March 22, 1996. It grossed $52.5 million worldwide on a $30–40 million budget.

== Plot ==
Mia Baran is a devout Catholic schoolteacher at a boys' school outside Pittsburgh where her husband, Guy, is schoolmaster. Guy is abusive to the weak Mia, a former nun who suffers from cardiomyopathy; his mistress, Nicole Horner, a fellow teacher at the school, is protective of Mia. When both women grow tired of his abuses, they collaborate to murder him in an apartment owned by a family friend of Nicole's. The women lure him there, and Mia drugs him before they successfully drown him in a bathtub. They wrap his body in a shower curtain and place it in a wicker box.

While en route to the school, Nicole crashes Guy's car in a pileup on the interstate, but the wicker box goes unnoticed by authorities. The women arrive at the school in the middle of the night, and dump Guy's corpse in the unkempt swimming pool on the property, staging his death as an accidental drowning. When his body fails to rise to the surface after several days, Nicole has the pool drained, but Guy's body is nowhere to be found. The women subsequently discover photos taken of them on the day of Guy's murder, and believe someone is blackmailing them.

After reading about the discovery of a John Doe in a nearby river, Mia goes to view the body at the sheriff's station, but finds it is not Guy. There, she attracts the attention of Shirley Vogel, a retired police officer-turned-private investigator who offers to look into Guy's disappearance. Nicole is resistant, and Shirley quickly becomes suspicious of the women. Their fears of a blackmailer are confirmed when Mia discovers the shower curtain used to conceal Guy's body hanging in her bathroom window.

Shirley confronts Mia with the accident report from Guy's car, and surmises that Guy was en route to see her in Pittsburgh on the day he disappeared. Mia grows increasingly paranoid, believing Guy is alive and stalking the women. This fear increases when two videographers filming an event at the school capture an image of Guy standing in one of the building's windows. Later, while investigating the school's basement, Shirley is attacked and knocked unconscious.

That night, Mia finds Guy floating in her bathtub, and witnesses him rise from the water. Terrified, she loses consciousness and collapses, apparently suffering a heart attack. Nicole arrives, and it is revealed that she and Guy had planned the series of events to scare Mia to the point of heart failure. Nicole laments, however, and tells Guy she had wanted to call it off. While overlooking Mia's body, Nicole realizes she is in fact not dead; when Guy realizes she is alive, he attacks both women, knocking Nicole unconscious.

Mia flees downstairs, and Guy tackles her to the ground in front of the pool and attempts to drown her. Nicole manages to stop him by driving a garden rake into his head, and he falls into the pool. As Nicole attempts to revive Mia, Guy pulls her into the pool and tries to drown her. Mia enters the pool, and together, both women successfully drown him. They exit the pool and are confronted by Shirley, who punches Mia in the face; willing to cover for the women, she explains it will help prove self-defense in Guy's murder. Mia walks away from the pool, distraught, and Shirley smokes a cigarette while watching Guy's body sink to the bottom.

== Cast ==
- Sharon Stone as Nicole Horner
- Isabelle Adjani as Mia Baran
- Chazz Palminteri as Guy Baran
- Kathy Bates as Shirley Vogel
- Spalding Gray as Simon Veatch
- Shirley Knight as Edie Danziger
- Allen Garfield as Leo Katzman
- Adam Hann-Byrd as Erik Pretzer
- Donal Logue as Video Photographer #1
- Diana Bellamy as Ms. Vawze
- Clea Lewis as Lisa Campos
- Jeffrey Abrams as Video Photographer #2
- O'Neal Compton as Irv Danziger
- Bingo O'Malley as Gannon

== Production ==
Producer Marvin Worth spent about three and a half years developing and casting. Chechik said he and screenwriter Don Roos worked on the script for about a year, shifting the story toward the two women's perspective.

Chechik called Sharon Stone from a Warner Bros. meeting to offer her the role, then flying to Paris to approach Isabelle Adjani. Stone had been sending him projects before Diabolique and accepted the role of Nicole as soon as he offered it. In a May 1996 interview with the San Francisco Chronicle, Stone, who was happy with the film, said she had approached it as a campy black comedy and that she and Chechik had different ideas about its tone. In a 2022 interview with A Rabbit's Foot, Adjani said she had expected a more feminist take on Clouzot's film. She accepted the role of Mia while dealing with her breakup with Daniel Day-Lewis and recalled doing her job on set even though "my heart wasn't in it." She subsequently put her career on hold and stopped working with an American agent. Jack Nicholson was interested in playing Guy Baran but had a commitment to Blood and Wine. Chechik felt Palminteri's casting made Guy's apparent death early in the film more believable. The remake reworks the original's male detective as Shirley Vogel, whom Bates played.

Filming took place in and around Pittsburgh, Pennsylvania. The former St. Philomena School was used as the primary filming location. Pittsburgh Film Office director Dawn Keezer said that the crew covered nearby houses with camouflage netting to make the school appear isolated. Other filming locations included Harmony and Uniontown, Pennsylvania.

Chechik proposed shooting at an American school in Morocco in bright daylight. The studio wanted a film noir look. He and cinematographer Peter James used stronger light for Stone and softer light for Adjani, which made their shared scenes technically difficult to shoot. Pampa News reported that Palminteri was due to finish filming his scenes in Diabolique the weekend of October 13, 1995. Los Angeles Times put the expected production cost at $30–40 million while filming was underway.

Henri-Georges Clouzot’s widow, Inès, sued Morgan Creek over the film rights. Time covered the dispute before release, and The History of French Literature on Film records that she received 750,000 French francs in compensation.

== Reception ==
=== Critical ===
Based on 30 reviews, the film scored 23% on Rotten Tomatoes. The site's consensus states: "This seedy remake of a classic French chiller goes through the motions in recreating the original's diabolical plot, but without the genuine suspense or stylistic finesse." Audiences surveyed by CinemaScore gave the film a grade of "C+" on a scale of A+ to F.

The movie was compared unfavorably to the original. Roger Ebert opined that "film lovers should study the two Diaboliques side by side, in order to see how the Hollywood assembly line trashed its treasure from the past." He wrote that the new version adds one surprise ending after another and that the final scenes gave the impression that the filmmakers "have contempt for the intelligence and taste of the audience". According to him, "they throw in slasher elements and violate the logic of two important characters just for a cheap payoff." He also criticized the rewriting of the inspector from the original film, which inspired the creation of Columbo, calling her endorsement of the murder a "travesty".

Owen Gleiberman graded the film C+. Janet Maslin enjoyed "the spectacle of Ms. Stone marching triumphantly toward the Dragon Lady stage of her career" but lamented the heavy-handed script and direction. Kenneth Turan compared the choice of Jeremiah Chechik to "assigning Captain Kangaroo to direct The Silence of the Lambs", concluding, "the entire picture has a clunky, hand-me-down feeling."

=== Box office ===
The film grossed $17.1 million in the United States. Overseas gross was reportedly around $35.4 million, making the worlwide total $52.5 million.
