= Jeremiah S. Chechik =

Film director

- Born: Montreal, Quebec, Canada
- Education: McGill University
- Occupations: Film director, photographer
- Years active: 1989–present
- Website: www.instagram.com/jeremiah_chechik/

Jeremiah S. Chechik (born Montreal, Quebec, Canada) is a Canadian film and television director and photographer. His feature work includes National Lampoon's Christmas Vacation (1989), Benny & Joon (1993), Diabolique (1996) and The Avengers (1998). He is also notable for his work in television, directing episodes for such shows as The Bronx Is Burning (2007), Burn Notice (2007–2013), Chuck (2007–2012), and Reginald the Vampire (2022–2024).

== Biography ==
While at McGill University, Chechik studied the theatrical arts. After graduating, he became a fashion photographer for Vogue. Since he also had a background in both music and design, Chechik decided to pursue filmmaking.

He landed early gigs directing television commercials, which impressed Stanley Kubrick who mentioned them in a NY Times article. Subsequently, he was invited to develop a film for Steven Spielberg's Amblin Entertainment that took place in and around the Apollo Theater in New York City. It was planned as a "very small movie" starring unknown actors.

Though that film was never made, Chechik began receiving scripts while at Warner Bros., eventually landing on National Lampoon's Christmas Vacation which would become his feature directorial debut.

The following year, Chechik began production on Arrive Alive which was shut down after eighteen days of shooting. The producers felt that star Willem Dafoe's performance was not funny enough and disrupted the comedic tone of the script. The footage has not been released in any form.

After directing several other films throughout the 1990s, Chechik was nominated for Worst Director at the 1998 Golden Raspberry Awards for The Avengers but lost to Gus Van Sant for his remake of Psycho.

After the failure of that film, Chechik took a break from directing and decided to travel. "I had an extreme kind of experiences all over the world, warzones and the like," he later reflected. Out of that, Chechik, who had never directed something he had written, began to write screenplays. While some of them were either commissioned or optioned by various studios, he decided that the development process had become too slow to pursue the projects.

Instead, Chechik began directing for television. In 2007, he helmed eight episodes of The Bronx is Burning. The following year, he and producer Michael Birnbaum purchased the screen rights to House of Night, a juvenile vampire book series from authors P. C. Cast and her daughter Kristin Cast.

He returned to the theatrical venue in 2013 with the film The Right Kind of Wrong, which was screened in the Gala Presentation section at that year's Toronto Film Festival.

In 2025, an exhibition of his artwork, titled Jeremiah Chechik: Explorer, was held at the Stamford Museum & Nature Center.

== Filmography ==
=== Directed works ===
Film

Year	Title	Distributor
1989	National Lampoon's Christmas Vacation	Warner Bros. Pictures
1993	Benny & Joon	Metro-Goldwyn-Mayer
1995	Tall Tale	Buena Vista Pictures Distribution
1996	Diabolique	Warner Bros. Pictures
1998	The Avengers	Warner Bros. Pictures
2013	The Right Kind of Wrong	Entertainment One

Television

Year	Title	Notes
1997	Gun	"Father John" (E6)
2004	Meltdown	Television film
2005	Tilt	2 episodes
2007	The Bronx Is Burning	Miniseries
2007–2011	Burn Notice	8 episodes
2008	The Middleman	4 episodes
2009	The Beast	"The Walk In" (E9)
2009–2012	Chuck	5 episodes
2009	Mental	"Obsessively Yours" (E7)
2009–2010	Leverage	2 episodes
2010–2011	Gossip Girl	3 episodes
2010	The Good Guys	2 episodes
2011	Being Human	2 episodes
2011	The Glades	"Addicted to Love" (S2 E7)
2011	Warehouse 13	"Queen for a Day" (S3 E4)
2011	Against the Wall	"We Protect Our Own" (E13)
2011–2013	Hart of Dixie	3 episodes
2013–2014	Reign	2 episodes
2014–2015	Helix	6 episodes
2014–2015	Motive	2 episodes
2015	Bitten	"Scare Tactics" (S2 E2)
2015–2017	Rogue	8 episodes
2015	South of Hell	2 episodes
2016	Shadowhunters	"Bad Blood" (S1 E8)
2016	Criminal Minds: Beyond Borders	"The Ballad of Nick and Nat" (S1 E11)
2017	The Gifted	"boXed in" (S1 E5)
2022–2024	Reginald the Vampire	8 episodes

=== Unmade projects ===
Year	Title	Distributor	Ref
1988	Untitled film	Warner Bros. Pictures	
1991	Arrive Alive	Paramount Pictures	
1992	Honey, I Blew Up the Kid	Buena Vista Pictures Distribution	
1993	Cool Runnings	Buena Vista Pictures Distribution	
1994	The Three Musketeers	TriStar Pictures	
2008	Pomona Queen	—N/a	
2009	House of Night	—N/a	
2017	Little Mizz Innocent	—N/a	
