= List of thriller films of the 1950s =

A list of thriller films released in the 1950s.

Title	Director	Cast	Country	Subgenre/notes
1950
Armored Car Robbery	Richard Fleischer	Charles McGraw, Adele Jergens, William Talman	United States	Crime thriller
The Asphalt Jungle	John Huston	Sterling Hayden, Louis Calhern, James Whitmore	United States	Crime thriller
The Killer That Stalked New York	Earl McEvoy	Evelyn Keyes, Charles Korvin, William Bishop	United States	Crime thriller
The Man Who Cheated Himself	Felix E. Feist	Lee J. Cobb, John Dall, Jane Wyatt	United States	Psychological thriller
Mystery Street	John Sturges	Ricardo Montalbán, Sally Forrest, Bruce Bennett	United States	
Panic in the Streets	Elia Kazan	Richard Widmark, Paul Douglas, Barbara Bel Geddes	United States	
Seven Days to Noon	John Boulting, Roy Boulting	Barry Jones, Olive Sloane	United Kingdom	
Side Street	Anthony Mann	Farley Granger, Cathy O'Donnell, James Craig	United States	Crime thriller
Stage Fright	Alfred Hitchcock	Jane Wyman, Marlene Dietrich, Michael Wilding	United States	
Where Danger Lives	John Farrow	Robert Mitchum, Faith Domergue, Claude Rains	United States	
Where the Sidewalk Ends	Otto Preminger	Dana Andrews, Gene Tierney, Gary Merrill	United States	
Woman on the Run	Norman Foster	Ann Sheridan, Dennis O'Keefe, Robert Keith	United States	
1951
Cause for Alarm!	Tay Garnett	Loretta Young, Barry Sullivan, Bruce Cowling	United States	
Fourteen Hours	Henry Hathaway	Richard Basehart, Paul Douglas, Barbara Bel Geddes	United States	
Strangers on a Train	Alfred Hitchcock	Farley Granger, Robert Walker, Ruth Roman	United States	
1952
Don't Bother to Knock	Roy Ward Baker	Richard Widmark, Marilyn Monroe, Anne Bancroft	United States	
The Narrow Margin	Richard Fleischer	Charles McGraw, Marie Windsor, Jacqueline White, Gordon Geberl	United States	
Sudden Fear	David Miller	Joan Crawford, Jack Palance, Gloria Grahame	United States	
Without Warning!	Arnold Laven	Adam Williams, Meg Randall	France; United States	
1953
The Big Heat	Fritz Lang	Glenn Ford, Gloria Grahame	United States	
The Hitch-Hiker	Ida Lupino	Edmond O'Brien, Frank Lovejoy, William Talman	United States	
The Limping Man	Cy Raker Endfield	Lloyd Bridges	United Kingdom	Crime thriller
Vicki	Harry Horner	Jeanne Crain, Jean Peters, Elliott Reid	United States	
The Wages of Fear	Henri-Georges Clouzot	Yves Montand, Charles Vanel	France; Italy	
1954
Les Diaboliques	Henri-Georges Clouzot	Simone Signoret, Véra Clouzot, Paul Meurisse	France	
Dial M for Murder	Alfred Hitchcock	Ray Milland, Grace Kelly, Robert Cummings	United States	
Rear Window	Alfred Hitchcock	James Stewart, Grace Kelly	United States	
Witness to Murder	Roy Rowland	Barbara Stanwyck, George Sanders, Gary Merrill	United States	
1955
Bad Day at Black Rock	John Sturges	Spencer Tracy, Robert Ryan, Anne Francis	United States	
Cast a Dark Shadow	Lewis Gilbert	Dirk Bogarde, Mona Washbourne, Margaret Lockwood	United Kingdom	
The Desperate Hours	William Wyler	Humphrey Bogart, Fredric March, Arthur Kennedy	United States	
Killer's Kiss	Stanley Kubrick	Frank Silvera, Jamie Smith, Irene Kane	United States	
A Kiss Before Dying	Gerd Oswald	Robert Wagner, Jeffrey Hunter, Joanne Woodward	United States	
Kiss Me Deadly	Robert Aldrich	Ralph Meeker, Albert Dekker, Paul Stewart	United States	
Mr. Arkadin	Orson Welles	Orson Welles, Michael Redgrave, Jack Watling, Patricia Medina	France; Spain; United Kingdom	Psychological thriller
The Night of the Hunter	Charles Laughton	Robert Mitchum, Shelley Winters, Lillian Gish	United States	
Rififi	Jules Dassin	Jean Servais, Carl Möhner, Robert Manuel	France	Crime thriller
1956
The Killing	Stanley Kubrick	Sterling Hayden, Coleen Gray, Marie Windsor	United States	Crime thriller
The Man Who Knew Too Much	Alfred Hitchcock	James Stewart, Doris Day	United States	
Please Murder Me	Peter Godfrey	Madge Blake, Raymond Burr	United States	
While the City Sleeps	Fritz Lang	Dana Andrews, Ida Lupino, Rhonda Fleming	United States	
1957
The Devil Strikes at Night	Robert Siodmak	Mario Adorf, Hannes Messemer, Claus Holm	Germany	
Les Espions	Henri-Georges Clouzot	Curd Jürgens, Véra Clouzot, Gerard Sety	France; Italy	Psychological thriller
Quatermass 2	Val Guest	Brian Donlevy, John Longden, Sid James	United Kingdom; United States	
1958
Elevator to the Gallows	Louis Malle	Jeanne Moreau, Maurice Ronet, Georges Poujouly	France	
It Happened in Broad Daylight	Ladislao Vajda	Heinz Rühmann, Gert Fröbe, Michel Simon	Switzerland; Germany; Spain	
The Quiet American	Joseph L. Mankiewicz	Audie Murphy, Michael Redgrave, Claude Dauphin	United States	
The Screaming Skull	Alex Nicol	John Hudson, Peggy Webber, Russ Conway	United States	Psychological thriller
Touch of Evil	Orson Welles	Charlton Heston, Janet Leigh, Orson Welles	United States	Psychological thriller
Vertigo	Alfred Hitchcock	James Stewart, Kim Novak, Barbara Bel Geddes	United States	Psychological thriller
1959
Jack the Ripper	Monty Berman, Robert S. Baker	Lee Patterson, Eddie Byrne, Betty McDowall	United Kingdom	
Night Train	Jerzy Kawalerowicz	Leon Niemczyk, Teresa Szmigielowna, Zbigniew Cybulski	Poland	Psychological thriller
North by Northwest	Alfred Hitchcock	Cary Grant, Eva Marie Saint	United States	
The Testament of Dr. Cordelier	Jean Renoir	Jean-Louis Barrault, Jean Topart, Michel Vitold	France	
