= Clouzot =

Clouzot may refer to:

- Henri-Georges Clouzot (1907–1977), French film director, screenwriter and producer
- Véra Clouzot (1913–1960), French film actress
