= Violent Road =

1958 film directed by Howard W. Koch

- Theatrical release poster
- Directed by: Howard W. Koch
- Screenplay by: Richard H. Landau
- Story by: Don Martin
- Based on: The Wages of Fear by Georges Arnaud
- Produced by: Aubrey Schenck
- Starring: Brian Keith; Dick Foran; Efrem Zimbalist, Jr. Merry Anders; Sean Garrison; Joanna Barnes
- Cinematography: Carl E. Guthrie
- Edited by: John F. Schreyer
- Music by: Leith Stevens
- Production company: Aubrey Schenck Productions
- Distributed by: Warner Bros. Pictures
- Release date: April 11, 1958
- Running time: 86 minutes
- Country: United States
- Language: English

Violent Road, also known as Hell's Highway, is a 1958 American film directed by Howard W. Koch, written by Richard H. Landau, and starring Brian Keith, Dick Foran, Efrem Zimbalist, Jr., Merry Anders, Sean Garrison and Joanna Barnes. A remake of The Wages of Fear, it was released by Warner Bros. Pictures on April 11, 1958.

== Plot ==
A rocket plant must be relocated after a deadly accident. Trucker Mitch Barton recruits a team for a suicidal job: to drive three trucks carrying extremely hazardous chemicals (nitric acid, hydrogen peroxide, and hydrazine) over a treacherous mountain road in just three days for $5,000 each. The rocket fuel developer, George Lawrence joins the group to ensure safety. The mission suffers a tragedy and nearly fails when one driver, Frank Miller, dies from chemical burns after heroically preventing an explosion. After overcoming breakdowns, fatigue, and other dangers, the surviving men have a chance to reexamine their lives, while completing the delivery.

== Cast ==
- Brian Keith as Mitch Barton
- Dick Foran as Frank "Sarge" Miller
- Efrem Zimbalist, Jr. as George Lawrence
- Merry Anders as Carrie
- Sean Garrison as Ken Farley
- Joanna Barnes as Peg Lawrence
- Perry Lopez as Manuelo
- Arthur Batanides as Ben
- Ed Prentiss as Mr. Nelson
- Ann Doran as Edith Miller
- John Dennis as Pat Farley
