= List of thriller films =

This is a chronological list of thriller films split by decade. Often there may be considerable overlap particularly between thriller and other genres (including, action, crime, and horror films); the list should attempt to document films which are more closely related to thriller, even if it bends genres.

== Films by decade ==
- List of thriller films before 1940
- List of thriller films of the 1940s
- List of thriller films of the 1950s
- List of thriller films of the 1960s
- List of thriller films of the 1970s
- List of thriller films of the 1980s
- List of thriller films of the 1990s
- List of thriller films of the 2000s
- List of thriller films of the 2010s
- List of thriller films of the 2020s

== See also ==
- List of science fiction thriller films
