= Sorcerer (film) =

1977 film by William Friedkin

- Theatrical release poster
- Directed by: William Friedkin
- Screenplay by: Walon Green; William Friedkin (Note: Uncredited)
- Based on: The Wages of Fear (1950 novel) by Georges Arnaud
- Produced by: William Friedkin
- Starring: Roy Scheider; Bruno Cremer; Francisco Rabal; Amidou; Ramon Bieri
- Cinematography: John M. Stephens; Dick Bush
- Edited by: Bud S. Smith; Robert K. Lambert
- Music by: Tangerine Dream
- Production companies: Universal Pictures; Paramount Pictures; Film Properties International
- Distributed by: Universal Pictures
- Release date: June 24, 1977
- Running time: 121 minutes
- Country: United States
- Languages: English; French; Spanish; German
- Budget: $21–22 million
- Box office: $5.9 million (theatrical rentals) $9 million (worldwide)

Sorcerer is a 1977 American action thriller film produced and directed by William Friedkin and starring Roy Scheider, Bruno Cremer, Francisco Rabal, and Amidou. It is the second adaptation of Georges Arnaud's 1950 novel The Wages of Fear, following the 1953 French-language film. Although it is often considered a remake of the earlier film, Friedkin disagreed with this assessment, considering it another adaptation of the novel with an entirely different vision.

Sorcerer depicts four fugitives who are assigned on a dangerous mission to transport two dilapidated trucks 218 miles (351 km) on a rough Latin American jungle road. The trucks are loaded with old, rotting dynamite that "sweats" its volatile basic ingredient, nitroglycerin, and the dynamite could explode if the trucks move too suddenly. The film was originally conceived as a small-scale side project to Friedkin's next major film, The Devil's Triangle, with a modest US$2.5 million budget. The director later opted for a more ambitious production, which he envisioned as his magnum opus.

Sorcerer's budget soon grew to $22 million following a grueling production with various filming locations—primarily in the Dominican Republic—and conflicts between Friedkin and his crew. Upon its initial release, the film received heavily mixed reviews and became a box office bomb that did not recoup its large budget. Many critics as well as Friedkin himself attributed the film's commercial failure to its release at roughly the same time as Star Wars, which instantly became a pop-culture phenomenon, and being overshadowed by many other very successful films of that year such as Smokey and the Bandit, Close Encounters of the Third Kind, Saturday Night Fever, etc. However, in the decades following, the film has enjoyed a significant critical reappraisal. Some critics have lauded it as an overlooked masterpiece, "perhaps the last undeclared masterpiece of the American '70s".

In addition to considering Sorcerer the most personal and difficult film he ever made, Friedkin also considered Sorcerer his favorite of all his films. Friedkin said: "It is the only film of mine that I wouldn't change." Tangerine Dream's electronic music score was acclaimed at the film's release, leading the band to become popular soundtrack composers in the 1980s. The film was largely forgotten for many years, as the only home video releases were low-quality, non-widescreen transfers. After a lengthy lawsuit filed against Universal Studios and Paramount, Friedkin supervised a restored re-release of the film, with the new print premiering at the 70th Venice International Film Festival on August 29, 2013. Warner Home Video released the restored version on Blu-ray on April 22, 2014. The Criterion Collection released Sorcerer on Blu-ray and Ultra HD Blu-ray on June 24, 2025.

== Plot ==
The film opens with a prologue that consists of four segments described by critics as "vignettes". They show the principal characters in different parts of the world and provide their backstories.

Nilo, an elegantly dressed man, enters a flat in Veracruz. Nilo immediately executes the unsuspecting tenant with a silenced revolver and proceeds to casually walk out of the building and onto the square.

A group of Palestinian militants disguised as Jews causes an explosion near the Damascus Gate in Jerusalem, after which they take shelter at their hideout, where they assemble weaponry and plan their escape. After getting surrounded by the Israel Defense Forces, they split up; two are killed and one is apprehended. The only one who manages to escape is Kassem, a demolitions expert. The segment finishes as he helplessly stares from a crowd at his captured companion.

While discussing a book his wife is editing, Victor Manzon discovers an anniversary gift from her: a watch with a special dedication. After meeting with the president of the Paris Stock Exchange, where he is accused of fraud, Victor is given 24 hours to provide collateral to have the charges dropped. Victor meets his business partner and brother-in-law, Pascal, and they quarrel; Victor insists that Pascal contact his father for financial assistance. Victor dines with his wife and her friend in a glamorous restaurant; he later receives a message from a butler that Pascal is waiting outside. When he learns that Pascal's father has refused to help, Victor is adamant that they try again. He walks his partner to a car, but Pascal unexpectedly commits suicide. Faced with impending doom, Victor leaves both his wife and the country.

In Elizabeth, New Jersey, an Irish gang robs a Catholic church that is connected with a rival Italian Mafia crew and organizes cash bingo games. During the heist, a robber shoots and wounds one of the priests counting the proceeds of the bingo. Back in their car, the Irish gang members engage in a heated argument that causes Jackie Scanlon, the driver, to lose concentration and collide with a truck. Everyone is killed but Jackie, who escapes with serious injuries. The wounded priest turns out to be the brother of Carlo Ricci, an Italian Mafia kingpin who also controlled the flow of money in the church and is determined to kill Jackie at all costs. Jackie meets with his friend Vinnie, who reveals the gravity of the situation and finds a suitable place for him to escape. Jackie has no option but to agree.

Kassem, Victor, and Jackie all assume fake identities and end up in Porvenir, a remote village somewhere in South America. Its conditions are in stark contrast to their previous lives. The village economy is heavily reliant on an American oil company. Kassem befriends a man called 'Márquez', presumably a Nazi war criminal. They all live in extreme poverty and earn meager salaries. All want out, but their savings are inadequate for emigration. After some time, Nilo arrives in the village, raising suspicions. In the meantime, an oil well explodes, and the only way to extinguish the fire is to use dynamite. Since the only available dynamite has been improperly stored in a remote depot, the nitroglycerin contained inside has become highly unstable; the faintest vibration could cause an explosion. With all other means ruled out, the only way to transport it the 218 miles (351 km) is to use trucks. The company seeks four drivers to man two vehicles. Kassem, Victor, Jackie and 'Márquez' are offered the job, but they have to assemble the trucks using scrap parts. Shortly before their departure, Nilo kills and replaces 'Márquez', which angers Kassem.

The four drivers embark upon the perilous journey, facing many hazards and internal conflicts. Despite their differences, they are forced to cooperate. They traverse a decrepit bridge during a violent thunderstorm, Kassem and Victor nearly losing their truck in the process. The team is forced to use one of the boxes of dynamite to destroy a massive fallen tree blocking their path. While traversing a cliff-side road, a guerrilla fighter shoots out one of Kassem and Victor's tires; the truck careens over the cliff, exploding and killing the drivers and gunman. When Nilo and Jackie stop at the scene of the destruction, more guerrillas surround them in an attempted robbery. They kill the men but Nilo is mortally wounded, soon dying from his injuries. Now alone, Jackie struggles to stay sane while overwhelmed by sleep deprivation, hallucinations and flashbacks. When his truck's engine dies less than 2 miles (3.2 km) short of the destination, he is forced to carry the remaining dynamite on foot. Once he finally reaches his destination, he collapses from exhaustion.

At the bar back in Porvenir, Jackie is given a Colombian passport and payment for the job by the oil company, as well as an offer of another job. Before he leaves, he asks a charwoman for a dance. As the two dance, Carlo Ricci's henchmen, along with Jackie's old friend Vinnie, emerge from a taxi and walk into the bar wielding guns. A single gunshot is heard, (Note: The sound effect was added for the 2014 video release. Friedkin was ambiguous if the audio was meant to depict a gunshot or simply a car backfiring.) and Jackie's fate is left unknown as the film cuts to black.

== Cast ==
- Roy Scheider as Jackie Scanlon / "Juan Domínguez", a driver who is marked for execution after his Irish-American gang robs a church and wounds a priest who is the brother of Carlo Ricci, a powerful Mafia crime boss now seeking vengeance. Some time after his escape to Porvenir, local authorities proved he was using a forged ID; as compensation they are taking one third of his daily wages. Moreover, they have proven that he does not speak Spanish. His appearance as an "everyman" is modeled after Humphrey Bogart's Fred C. Dobbs character in The Treasure of the Sierra Madre, with a "battered hat, unshaven face and tough guy stance". Screenwriter Walon Green described him as "believable, gutsy, and most important, desperately human". His characteristics are "most likely to reflect the self-image of the spectator".
- Bruno Cremer as Victor Manzon / "Serrano", an investment banker from Paris whose firm is accused of fraud. He speaks French, English, and German. Throughout the film, he "assumes a take-charge attitude" and stands for a "voice of discipline and reason" and negotiates the salary with Corlette on behalf of Scanlon, Nilo and Kassem, demanding double what was originally offered, in concert with legal residence. This was Cremer's first English-speaking role.
- Francisco Rabal as Nilo (a.k.a. "Pancho" to Scanlon), an enigmatic Mexican professional assassin, skilled in using firearms, who speaks English and Spanish. His visit in Porvenir was meant to be a temporary one, as he was in transit; however, for reasons unknown he decided to stay there. He is the last-minute replacement for "Márquez" as one of the truck drivers. He is hated by Kassem and initially disliked by Scanlon. This role was a Hollywood debut for Rabal, whom Friedkin had previously sought for the antagonist role in The French Connection. Despite having an occasion to star in a Hollywood movie, which was the actor's dream, Rabal was slightly disappointed with the movie's international scope and said, "[All] my life, I wanted to make a 'Hollywood' movie [and w]hen I finally did, it was filmed in Paris, Israel, Mexico and the Dominican Republic!"
- Amidou as Kassem / "Martínez", a Palestinian militant and explosives expert with "improvised engineering skills". His attitude is permeated by "angry determination" and he shows a strong dislike for Nilo.
- Ramon Bieri as Corlette, an oil company representative who seeks four experienced drivers to transport dynamite to extinguish a fire on a remote oil well. He believes the explosion was caused by local terrorists.
- Karl John as "Márquez", an old German and former Nazi who is Kassem's friend, wanting to help him to move abroad from Porvenir. He is initially chosen as one of the four drivers. "Márquez" was John's final role, as he died on December 22, 1977.
- Peter Capell as Lartigue, Corlette's superior.
- Anne-Marie Deschodt as Blanche Manzon, Victor's wife, who gives him a specially engraved watch as a wedding anniversary gift, which later on Victor tries in vain to sell in exchange for a way out of Porvenir.
- Friedrich von Ledebur as "Carlos", the owner of the El Corsario bar, of whom Scanlon joked was an "ex-Reichsmarschall".
- Chico Martínez as Bobby Del Rios, an explosives specialist and Corlette's advisor who assesses the situation at the oil well.
- Joe Spinell as "Spider", an acquaintance of Scanlon in Porvenir who takes part in the truck-driving test but fails.
- Rosario Almontes as Agrippa, a bar maid in El Corsario who seems to be fond of Manzon as she gives him a crucifix before his departure. Almontes was a Dominican local with no prior acting experience, Sorcerer was her sole film role.

Other cast members include Richard Holley as Billy White, a helicopter pilot who rules out shipping the dynamite by air; Jean-Luc Bideau as Pascal, Manzon's brother-in-law who fails to receive help from his father to save their company from execution of fraud; Jacques François as Lefevre, the president of the Paris Stock Exchange, who accuses Manzon of money fraud; Gerard Murphy as Donnelly, a head of the Irish gang of which Jackie Scanlon is a member; Randy Jurgensen as Vinnie, a friend of Scanlon who directs him to the Baltimore docks from where he has to flee to a yet undisclosed location in order to evade execution from the Mafia; and Cosmo Allegretti as Carlo Ricci, a vengeful Mafia leader and a brother of a priest who was shot in New Jersey during the robbery who puts a bounty on the head of Jackie Scanlon.

== Title and themes ==
The film's title refers to one of the trucks, which has the name Sorcerer painted across the side (the other is named Lazaro); the narrative features no supernatural or magical character or event. As director William Friedkin went location scouting in Ecuador and researched the peculiar ornaments on cargo trucks he had seen there, he noticed there were names painted on them, which ranged from relatives to mythological references. Firstly he came up with the name Lazaro after Lazarus; then after some time struggling to find another moniker, a listen to the Miles Davis album Sorcerer served as an inspiration to name the other truck. Friedkin then decided to change his working title Ballbreaker to Sorcerer, which he described as "an intentional but ill-advised reference to The Exorcist".

Friedkin thought the title fit the film's general theme:

The Sorcerer is an evil wizard and in this case the evil wizard is fate. The fact that somebody can walk out of their front door and a hurricane can take them away, an earthquake or something falling through the roof. And the idea that we don’t really have control over our own fates, neither our births nor our deaths, it’s something that has haunted me since I was intelligent enough to contemplate something like it.

Friedkin elaborated on this theme in an interview with Thomas D. Clagett:

I wasn't prepared for my success or failure. I felt ... buffeted by fate without any control over [my] destiny. That's one of the themes of Sorcerer. No matter how much you struggle, you get blown up. [...] It's about revenge, vengeance, betrayal – this is how I feel about life ... life is filled with betrayal ... false promises ... fate is waiting around the corner to kick you in the ass.

In the director's opinion, the premise of The Wages of Fear (both the novel and the first film adaptation) seemed to him a metaphor for "the world [being] full of strangers who hated one another, but if they didn't cooperate, if they didn't work together in some way, they would blow up." Walon Green, the screenwriter, said that he and Friedkin "wanted a cynical movie where fate turns the corner for the people before they turn it themselves". Additionally, their intention was to "write a real movie about what we thought was the reality of Latin America and the presence of foreigners there today".

During a scene in Paris involving a conversation between Victor and his wife, she reads him a memoir of a retired French Foreign Legion officer who has to make a decision whether to kill a civilian or not. The officer eventually does so, which to Victor means that he was "just another soldier". His wife counters with an argument that "no one is just anything". For Friedkin, this phrase stands for "the theme of the film". Film critic Gloria Heifetz has added that Friedkin's direction prevents this line from becoming sentimental, and ties in with the film's finale.

== Production ==
=== Pre-development ===
Friedkin originally conceived Sorcerer as a "little 2.5 million in-between movie", a stepping stone to realize his next major project, The Devil's Triangle, the planned follow-up to The Exorcist. However, Steven Spielberg at that point had already made Close Encounters of the Third Kind, which presumably nullified the project. Peter Biskind theorized that Friedkin had always seen Francis Ford Coppola as his competitor, so when Coppola headed to the Philippines to direct Apocalypse Now, Friedkin went to Latin America to shoot Sorcerer.

Friedkin's intention was not to create a remake, but to direct a film using only the same basic outline with completely original protagonists. He also wanted the film to be "grittier than Clouzot's [version], with the 'documentary feel' for which [he] had become known." Friedkin initially also wanted to get Clouzot's Wages of Fear re-released in American theaters but could not convince any major studio to do so. He felt that American audiences had very limited exposure to Clouzot's film and that the English-speaking world in general was not very familiar with it.

==== Writing and influences ====
Friedkin appointed Walon Green as the film's screenwriter. The director got to know Green in the 1960s, and was since highly impressed with his work on Sam Peckinpah's western The Wild Bunch. Friedkin described Green as a multilingual person, fluently speaking French, Spanish, Italian, and German, as well as having "an encyclopedic knowledge of classical music and literature". Prior to writing the script, Green expressed enthusiasm about the project and suggested Friedkin read Gabriel García Márquez's novel One Hundred Years of Solitude. Friedkin described it as "another lifechanging work" which served as a workprint for their adaptation of Wages of Fear. The story outline was created by both Friedkin and Green, and the script was finished in four months. Gerard Murphy, who portrayed the head of the Irish gang during the Elizabeth church robbery, was a real-life criminal involved in a similar heist. Friedkin used details from Murphy's stories and used them as an inspiration. The remaining members of the gang were "nonactors but part of Gerry's world", including one IRA member.

Some reviewers likened certain elements of the film to Werner Herzog's 1972 movie Aguirre, the Wrath of God, such as Alex Peterson, who thought both movies are notable for their "ability to create a truly threatening atmosphere out of a lush jungle location, and for asking the dubiously pertinent question of what greed and crazy determination might bring to men." This connection was explored further in Friedkin's 2013 memoir, The Friedkin Connection, when the director likened himself to a character from another Herzog movie; in the process of making the film, he "had become like Fitzcarraldo, the man who built an opera house in the Brazilian jungle."

Several critics compared the movie to John Huston's The Treasure of the Sierra Madre. Phil Mucci indicated a similarity in terms of the premise as a "tale of desperate men in desperate times, bound together by fate and circumstance," and Thomas D. Clagett likened Jackie Scanlon's characteristics and appearance to Fred C. Dobbs (played by Humphrey Bogart) from Huston's movie. According to Clagett, who cites Friedkin, this was intentional. Phil Mucci notes the visual influence of French New Wave, as well as Gillo Pontecorvo's The Battle of Algiers, the latter comment also mirrored by Shaun Crawford, Tom Stempel in his book Framework: A History of Screenwriting in the American Film, and Ken Dancyger in The Technique of Film and Video Editing: History, Theory, and Practice, where he states that by employing similar techniques to Pontecorvo, in the prologues he "establish[es] credibility" as well as makes "[these] histories as realistic as possible." Stempel additionally alluded the film's episodic structure to Robert Altman's work. Crawford also observes that the film possesses "cinéma vérité sensibilities", which in his opinion allow the director to capture "its grimy realism". Dancynger also touches upon this thread and assesses the Jerusalem prologue sequence as shot entirely in "cinéma vérité fashion".

==== Obtaining the license ====
Before the actual production could take place, William Friedkin had to resolve the problem with licensing, because Henri-Georges Clouzot did not own the rights for the intellectual property. It was owned by the novelist Georges Arnaud:

"First we had to acquire the rights, and this proved to be complicated. The Clouzot film is of iconic stature, but Clouzot didn't own the rights. The novelist Georges Arnaud, who wrote the original source material, Le Salaire de la peur, controlled them, and he had a longstanding feud with Clouzot. He was happy to sell the rights to us, but I felt I had to meet with Clouzot in Paris and get his blessing first".

Upon Friedkin revealing his intentions to Clouzot, Clouzot was surprised Friedkin wanted to reimagine Wages of Fear because of enormous praise he had received at the time for his two recent pictures. Friedkin offered Clouzot a percentage of the film's shares, for which the French director was thankful. In 2013, after a screening of Sorcerer at the Brooklyn Academy of Music, Friedkin mentioned that he "went to Georges Arnaud's home through his attorney, and he was very pleased to have this done because he didn't like Clouzot's film, if you can believe that".

==== Casting ====
And it was only a week later that I realized a close up of Steve McQueen was worth the greatest landscape you could find.

— William Friedkin's afterthoughts on losing Steve McQueen as the leading actor

Friedkin originally envisioned an all-star cast of Steve McQueen, Marcello Mastroianni, and Lino Ventura.

McQueen was the director's first choice for Jackie Scanlon, a small-time criminal who ends up a fugitive from the law and the Mafia after a robbery of a New Jersey church. Scanlon's role was written specifically for McQueen after Friedkin met him in person and he turned out to be very keen on the idea. McQueen loved the script, and even went as far as to say "This is the best script I've ever read", but did not want to leave the country or wife Ali MacGraw at the time. Instead, he proposed that MacGraw become an associate producer or that a part be written for her in the film; however, Friedkin declined both his wishes, stating that "there's hardly a major role as a woman…and we don't have associate producers who don't do anything, we're not going to make her an AP." It eventually led to McQueen's declining the offer, upsetting the director greatly, and making Friedkin later regret this decision.

After the disagreement with McQueen, Friedkin approached Robert Mitchum who, despite appreciating the script, sternly declined, asking Friedkin "Why would I want to go to Ecuador for two or three months to fall out of a truck? I can do that outside my house." The role was then offered to Clint Eastwood and Jack Nicholson, neither of whom was willing to travel to the Dominican Republic. Another candidate for Scanlon's role was Warren Oates, but once the movie's budget escalated beyond $10 million, the studio decided that "[his] name wasn't big enough to carry that big a picture." They eventually worked together on Friedkin's follow-up to Sorcerer, titled The Brink's Job.

Marcello Mastroianni was offered the role of Nilo, which he initially accepted, but due to problems related to his daughter's custody after his separation from Catherine Deneuve, he ultimately declined the director's offer. He was replaced by Spanish actor Francisco Rabal, whom Friedkin had wanted for the role of "Frog One" in The French Connection because he loved his performance in Luis Buñuel's Belle de Jour, but the casting director mistakenly got Fernando Rey instead.

Manzon's role was intended for one of the most prominent European actors, Lino Ventura. Despite Ventura's concerns about his English, he initially accepted Friedkin's proposal. However, after McQueen backed out, Ventura was hesitant to take part in the movie.

It was not until Universal executive Sidney Sheinberg suggested Roy Scheider that Friedkin managed to cast the leading role of Jackie Scanlon. They had previously worked on The French Connection together, but had lost contact after Friedkin—at William Peter Blatty's insistence—refused to cast Scheider as Father Karras in The Exorcist. With Universal unenthusiastic about the project, acquiring Scheider, who had recently enjoyed enormous success in Steven Spielberg's Jaws, increased the studio's confidence. Production notes on the 1998 Universal DVD release tell a different story, noting that the casting of Scheider as Scanlon/Domínguez was a "foregone conclusion" and "the ideal (perhaps the only) choice for the role" since Friedkin had directed him previously in The French Connection.

After casting Scheider in the main role, Lino Ventura refused to take second billing to him. The actor was replaced by Bruno Cremer, who, among other pictures prior to Sorcerer, had played in Costa-Gavras's Section spéciale and whom Friedkin described as a "good actor".

The only actor who was Friedkin's original choice was the French-Moroccan Amidou, who played the Palestinian resistance fighter, Kassem. Friedkin was so impressed with his performance in Claude Lelouch's La Vie, l'amour, la mort (released in 1968) that he wrote down his name immediately upon seeing the movie, expecting to collaborate with him one day.

Friedkin overall felt dissatisfied with the casting process. He felt Sorcerer "needed stars" and claimed that the actors hired for the roles of Scanlon and Manzon were his fifth, sixth or seventh preferred choices. Rabal, however, was his "about second or third choice". Despite liking Cremer, Friedkin felt that this role would benefit from the presence of Jean-Paul Belmondo or Lino Ventura. The abundance of foreign actors on the cast list prompted Sidney Sheinberg to ask the director whether he would like them to have Anglicized pseudonyms.

=== Characterization and design ===
One of my themes is that there is good and evil in everyone. I was not out to make these guys heroes. I really don't believe in heroes. The best of people have a dark side and it's a constant struggle for the better side to survive and to thrive.

— William Friedkin's attitude towards characterization

According to Friedkin cited by Kachmar, his artistic intent was to shoot the entire film without "sentiment" or "melodrama", rendering it completely devoid of "heartfelt moments". Friedkin's oeuvre has been frequently noted by critics for its lack of "clear-cut heroes or villains", and the director himself admitted that he believes in neither. Thus, he envisioned all four principal characters to be anti-heroes and "hard to 'root for'". Friedkin felt very confident about himself at the time, thinking he was "bulletproof [and] nothing was going to stop [him]", and felt he "could take an audience through this with not the most likable people on Earth." Speaking specifically about The French Connection, the director also stated that he found inspiration for his films in F. Scott Fitzgerald, who kept a notecard above his typewriter that read "action is character," meaning "what characters do is who they are."

Serdar Yegulalp notes distinctive characteristics and traits of each of the protagonists and praises Friedkin's execution by saying that the film "never falls into the trap of having each character shine on cue: they only do their thing when they’re backed up against the abyss, much as we all do in the real world" and adding that "their desperation's not a pose".

Prior to the post-production process, the movie contained a significantly larger amount of dialogue, and a detailed analysis of the European and American cuts reveals that certain scenes involving the relationship between Scanlon and Nilo, as well as presenting some of Nilo's motives, were removed.

Unlike The Wages of Fear, in which the main characters were given two trucks in mint condition by the oil company, their counterparts depicted in Sorcerer had to be assembled by the protagonists themselves, using parts salvaged from wrecks. The production got two GMC 2 1/2-ton capacity M211 military trucks, first deployed in 1952 during the Korean War as transport trucks. Using the knowledge gained from the visits to Ecuador, Friedkin employed a Dominican artisan in order to embellish the vehicles with symbols and paintings based on the names Lazaro and Sorcerer.

=== Filming ===
Friedkin chose Dick Bush as his director of photography after seeing the film version of the rock opera Tommy, directed by Ken Russell, and after finding out that Bush had filmed Gustav Mahler's biography as well as collaborated with Lindsay Anderson, whom Friedkin regarded highly. Scheider's then-wife, Cynthia Scheider, was an assistant film editor who had previously worked with Bud Smith on The Exorcist. Since shooting the film required a prolonged stay in South America, Scheider asked Friedkin if she could stay with him and have a job in an editing capacity. The director fulfilled his wish and was reportedly "delighted". Sorcerer was filmed during a ten-month production schedule, using approximately 1,200 camera set-ups. The director attempted to complete the picture "without relying on dialogue", and "telling the story through imagery" instead. In the film's pressbook Friedkin states that for him creating a film is multi-faceted experience: "[e]very film is actually three films[.] There is the film you conceive and plan. There is the film you actually shoot. And there is the film that emerges with you in the editing room".

Principal photography commenced on location in Paris and depicted Victor Manzon's backstory. The sequence filmed in Jerusalem was realized with cooperation of Israeli security forces who portrayed themselves in the pursuit scenes. The mock explosion that occurred during the Jerusalem scenes had such power that it broke a window of the city's mayor's house, which was located 6 metres (20 ft) away. The detonation was controlled by Nick Dimitri, a stuntman portraying an Israeli soldier, who positioned himself too close to explosives which resulted in injuries. However, after an hour the director ordered a second take, being adamant about the previous accident. Dimitri praised Friedkin's craftmanship by saying that "when you watch the movie and everything gets obliterated, you can't even tell if it's the first or second take". Moreover, during the realization of the sequence, an actual bombing took place in the vicinity, which prompted Friedkin to capture additional footage which in his opinion added "a documentary reality". The fourth prologue vignette, taking place in Elizabeth, New Jersey, contains a scene involving a car crash. It took twelve takes and approximately ten days to achieve what Friedkin intended. The director recalls the sequence as seemingly "impossible to shoot", having involved several stuntmen from New York, the crew wrecked seven vehicles over the course of a week, without satisfying the director's intent. Friedkin then put himself in the passenger seat to evaluate the negative aspects of the scene's execution. The director became fed up with the situation and decided to listen to David Salven, the line producer, who suggested that they employ a well-known specialist, Joie Chitwood Jr., whom Friedkin described as "short, stocky, part Indian, self-assured, and fearless". After Friedkin supplied him with all the necessary information about the set's infrastracture, Chitwood meticulously analyzed the surroundings himself, and ordered the special effects technicians to construct a 40 feet (12 m) long slanted ramp which would allow him to "drive the car at top speed on two wheels, flip it in midair, and crash into a fire hydrant". The construction took three days, and the stunt was successful during its very first take.

Friedkin said the most important scene in the film was "the bridge-crossing sequence, wherein the two trucks have to separately cross an old wooden suspension bridge that appears completely unstable". He also deemed it the most arduous scene he has ever filmed. The bridge was designed by John Box using carefully hidden hydraulic components allowing control of the movements of the bridge and the trucks alike. Its first iteration was constructed in the Dominican Republic over a period of three months, and it required $1 million to complete. However, as soon as it was finished, Friedkin's crew faced a problem of abnormally low rainfall. During the construction process, the river's water level decreased dramatically, and by the time the bridge was assembled, the river had become completely dry, despite the assurance of local engineers that there had not been any recorded fluctuations in water level during the dry season. Studio executives suggested Friedkin devise a less sophisticated scene, but instead he continued to realize his vision in different locations. Thus, John Box went to scout locations in Mexico and found that the Papaloapan River possessed similar characteristics. The previously constructed bridge had to be disassembled and re-anchored. Friedkin's crew's arrival caused a major disturbance in the vicinity among the locals because of his reputation as a director of The Exorcist. However, a part of the population offered help to finish the structure. Ultimately, this river also became stricken with drought, which forced the application of some practical effects to complete the scene. In order to create artificial rain, Friedkin employed sewage pumps draining water from the river and diverting it to a sprinkler system. This scene alone, which lasts 12 minutes, took several months to complete and cost approximately three million dollars. The director has claimed that during this sequence, the truck teetering against the ropes actually tipped over into the river several times, causing numerous retakes.

The stunt coordinator for the film was Bud Ekins, who was Steve McQueen's stunt double in The Great Escape. He was friends with the film editor, Bud Smith, who recalls Ekins being "as cool as cucumber". In some cases stuntmen were employed throughout the making of the film but generally speaking the principal actors acted as their own doubles and were actual truck drivers. For instance, since Roy Scheider's character Jackie Scanlon was meant to be a mob's wheelman, he had to undertake a special preparation for maneuvering a vintage truck with the purpose of gaining the necessary driving skills. He summarized the experience as "rehearsing to stay alive". Scheider has emphasized that no rear-screen projection or any other kinds of "trick photography" were used, due to the distance between the cameras, the vehicles and the surrounding terrain. In a 1977 interview for The New York Times, Scheider said that shooting Sorcerer "made Jaws look like a picnic." He mentioned that the stuntmen were unhappy because of the fact the leading actors performed their own stunts, and added that the scene involving crossing a suspension rope bridge is "what really happened". Scheider called it the most perilous sequence he has ever taken part in. Amidou, in an interview for the Morocco Times in 2005, stated that out of all movies in his oeuvre, Sorcerer left the most lasting impression on him since he "refused to have a substitute and paid for it physically."

Friedkin antagonized Paramount, using a Gulf and Western corporate photo for a scene that featured the evil board of directors of the fictional company which hired the men to deliver dynamite. Walon Green recalled the experience in the following way:

[Friedkin] put Bluhdorn's picture on the wall in the office in the scene where [the oil company foreman] finds out that the well is blown by terrorists and they can't do anything about it. When Bluhdorn saw his picture on the wall as chairman of the oil company he had a shit hemorrhage!

==== Locations ====
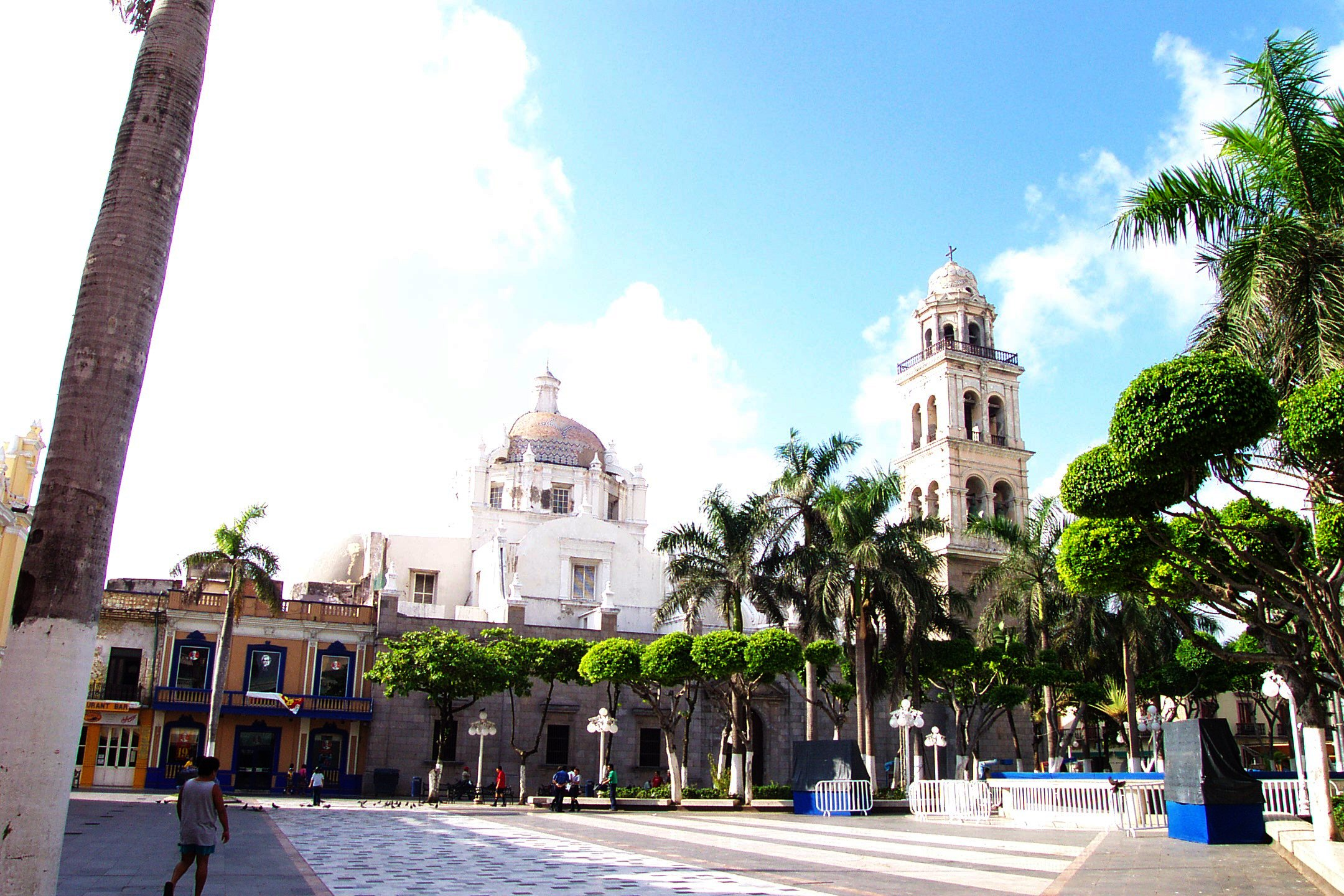
Veracruz town square, Mexico – a location used for the first prologue sequence, featuring Nilo, although it was filmed as the last during the production

To create four prologues for the characters' respective backstories, Friedkin shot each of the vignettes on location, respectively in Paris for Victor Manzon, Jerusalem for Kassem, Elizabeth, New Jersey, for Jackie Scanlon, and Veracruz, Mexico, for Nilo. The main part of the film was, on the other hand, originally meant to be shot in Ecuador, which impressed Friedkin tremendously. However, such a diversity of locations caused serious concerns about the budget. After strong opposition from Lew Wasserman, who was the owner of Universal Studios at the time, Friedkin had to opt out from shooting there. The director eventually settled on the Dominican Republic, after receiving a green light from the studio's executives. In a memoir, Infamous Players: A Tale of Movies, the Mob (And Sex), film producer Peter Bart theorized that the owner of Gulf and Western, Charlie Bluhdorn, supported the Dominican Republic financially and intended to create a film-making centre there. Paul Rowlands, a critic, stated that "it's likely the decision to film in the Dominican Republic was one favoured by Bluhdorn."

After scouting locations with Walon Green and John Box, the production designer, they chose Villa Altagracia as the main location. Friedkin described the place as "a prison without walls" with a "sense of timeless poverty and persecution".

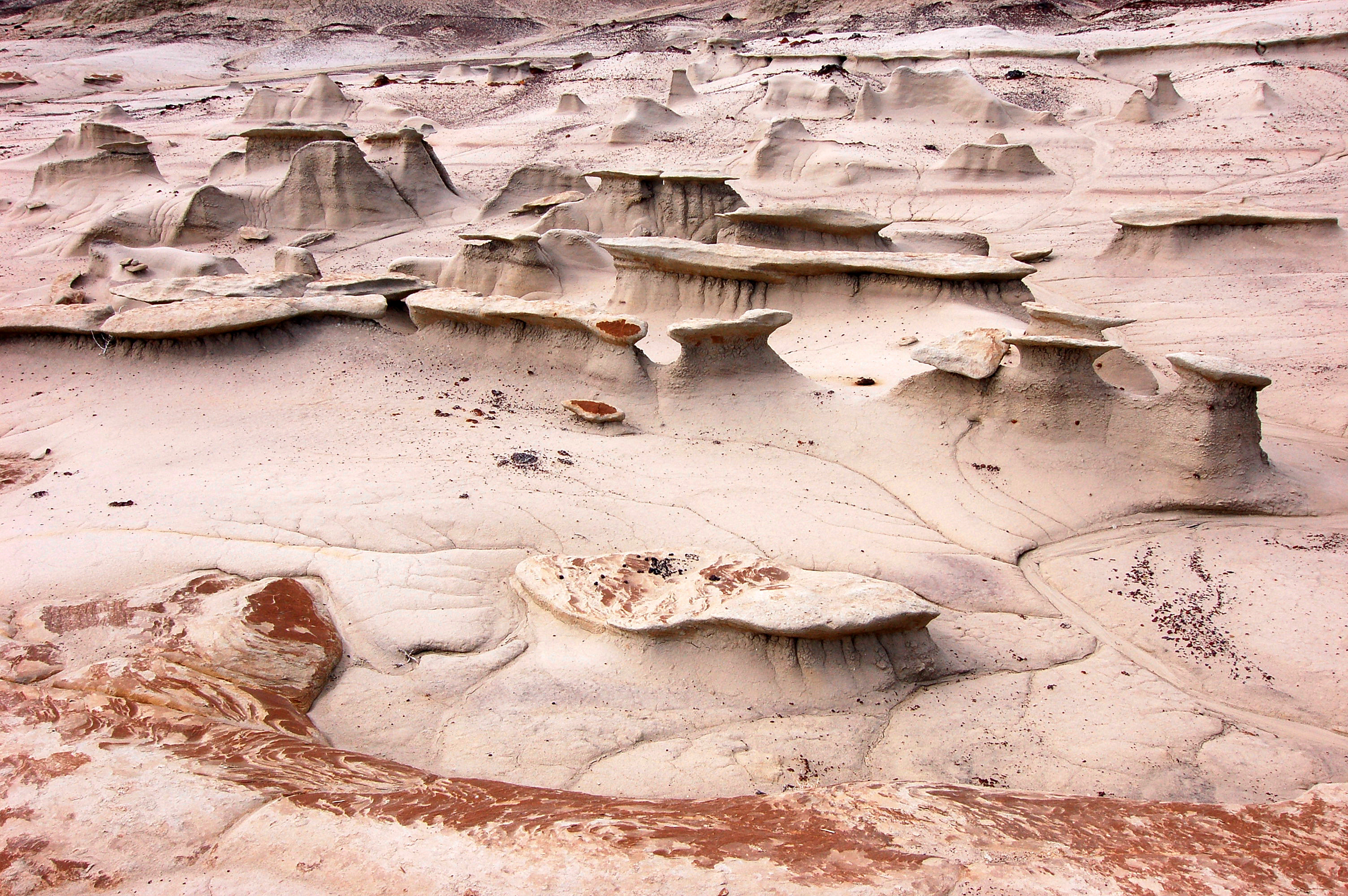
Bisti/De-Na-Zin Wilderness in New Mexico, used as a backdrop in the film's hallucinatory climax

Although the majority of the film was filmed in the Dominican Republic, Friedkin did not hesitate to look for other locales to achieve the desired effect. One of the most notable ones is depicted in the film's climax. It features a surrealistic landscape on Navajo Nation lands in the Bisti/De-Na-Zin Wilderness, New Mexico:

The one sequence left to shoot was the last leg of the journey of the surviving truck, the Lazaro, and I wanted it to be different from the other locations… and John Box found it in a place called the Bisti Badlands in northwestern New Mexico, 35 miles (56 km) south of the town called Farmington… It was the landscape we chose for the end of the journey, in which Scanlon embraces madness, abandons his truck, and carries the dynamite 2 miles (3.2 km) to the burning oilfield.

==== On-set conflicts and problems ====
During a sequence involving the detonation of an enormous kaoba tree, Friedkin was faced with a problem of inadequate explosive power. Initially, Marcel Vercoutere, a special effects man who previously worked with the director on The Exorcist, was to be responsible for the explosion. However, it did not achieve the required effect and barely damaged the tree. This prompted Friedkin to reach for the services of an arsonist hailing from Queens, New York, going by the pseudonym "Marvin the Torch", who arrived at the Dominican Republic three days after the call and utilizing flammable materials obliterated the tree in one take the following morning. A week into the shooting in the Dominican Republic, Friedkin and his crew went to Los Angeles to process the film and view dailies. The director described the prologues as "beautifully shot", but he was dissatisfied with the jungle scenes which he deemed "underexposed" and "dark". He told Dick Bush a reshoot would be necessary. Bush, on the other hand, argued that filming should have taken place on a stage where he could have adequately adjusted the lighting. The response reminded Friedkin of his previous problems on the set of The Boys in the Band and offended him, as from the very beginning he had wanted to shoot the entire film on location. Upon seeing the underexposed scenes, Bush reportedly "lost confidence" and was subsequently dismissed, which forced Friedkin to employ a new camera crew. He replaced Bush with John M. Stephens with whom he had worked under David L. Wolper. Stephens applied necessary changes, including the employment of reflectors balancing "the deep shadows of the tall trees", as well as replacing lenses and film stock. This resulted in a leap of cinematographic quality which delighted the director, who has said "the locations looked beautiful to the eye".

Apart from Bush, Friedkin had a feud with the chief Teamsters representative whom he dismissed at some point and which prompted the director to find another trucker crew. The director also fired five production managers, which upset Scheider, who said that he was "tired of going to the airport and saying goodbye to them," as well as adding that he was the only person Friedkin could not drop, as he was the leading actor. David Salven, initially chosen as a line producer, had to quit for personal reasons, as he was facing the possibility of a divorce. Friedkin regretted this situation, as he praised Salven greatly for his previous contributions to his movies. He was replaced by Ian Smith, whom the director described as "experienced and efficient". In Tuxtepec, Mexico, where the suspension bridge scene was filmed, an undercover federal agent informed Friedkin that several of his crew members, including grip crew men, stuntmen and a makeup artist, were in the possession of drugs and were urged to leave the country or face prison sentences. It reportedly took two weeks to replace the crew workers. Besides internal on-set conflicts, Friedkin, cited by Mucci, said that approximately fifty people "had to leave the film for either injury or gangrene," as well as food poisoning and malaria. In The Friedkin Connection he added that "almost half the crew went into the hospital or had to be sent home." Friedkin himself lost fifty pounds (23 kg) and was stricken with malaria, which was diagnosed after the film's premiere. Tim Applegate concluded an account of the troubled film-making of Sorcerer by comparing Friedkin to Francis Ford Coppola during the production of Apocalypse Now: "Friedkin took his camera crew to the jungle and never quite returned."

During the shooting of the film in Villa Altagracia, a lawsuit was filed against Cinema Dominica (a subsidiary of Gulf and Western) by Dominican businessmen for alleged damages. The newspaper El Caribe said that the lawsuit against Cinema Dominica charged that the company had “failed to comply with the rental contract it signed for use of the town's commercial locations.”

Friedkin recalls working with Scheider as difficult, stating the actor had frequent mood swings which did not occur during the filming of The French Connection and theorized that after achieving stardom with Jaws he became "difficult", which contrasted with his attitude from The French Connection, where he "would've lied [sic] down in front of an elevated train" for Friedkin. The director stated Scheider at times was "impossible to talk to" and completely indifferent towards any of his suggestions. He summarized the experience by saying the arduous production schedule and difficult conditions in the Dominican Republic were most likely the reasons behind their difficult relationship. Likewise, Scheider also had his reservations about the work with Friedkin, on the one hand praising him as an "extraordinarily gifted filmmaker, who told stories with pictures and shot beautifully" but despite his erudition, he was marred with a distrusting attitude which made everyone around him very tense. According to Diane Kachmar, Friedkin believed that he inspired others to achieve great results, but Scheider did not favor such working conditions. However, Scheider also admitted that only a director of Friedkin's stature could have persuaded him to perform all the life-threatening scenes he did, and added that upon seeing the dailies he "knew it was worth it". Despite the mutual tensions, the director rated Scheider highly, did not hold any grudges, and regretted he did not receive more recognition for his body of work. However, their relationship eventually "drifted apart".

=== Sound ===
The sound design crew included Jean-Louis Ducarme, with whom Friedkin had worked on The Exorcist and of whom he thought very highly. He was joined by Robert Knudson, who also was a sound effects supervisor for Friedkin's previous movie as well as Robert Glass and Richard Tyler. The sound crew employed distorted samples of tiger and cougar roars for the truck engines' sound. C.J. Schexnayder noted that such a technical exercise was "relatively unique for the period"; but, over the years, techniques such as these became a staple of film-making. The sound design eventually garnered the movie's sole Academy Award nomination, which it lost to Star Wars.

== Music ==
William Friedkin, untitled poem

In the bottomless silence. Without warning
A curtain slowly ascends revealing
A midnight dawn. A whisper of chill wind
And white sun eclipsed by pale yellow moon.

Rumor of distant thunder trembles along the
edge of a galaxy
Cascading down infinite corridors of burning
mirrors reflecting and rereflecting
momentous oceans of stampeding
wild horses.

Glass shatters, shrieks and spins away
becoming clusters of starfall that scatter
from hidden places. Pulsating. Relentless
like a recurring nightmare.

Centaurs throb within the blood crossing
arteries of storming cavalries that
crash though the top of your head
Recycle and recur
Again and again
Reminding of white suns eclipsing oceans of
stars shrieking through the midnight dawn.

Never ending. Without warning.

— Sorcerer soundtrack back cover

Sorcerer marked the first Hollywood film score for the German krautrock and electronic band Tangerine Dream. William Friedkin, during his visit in Germany, attended their concert in a derelict church in the Black Forest. The band seemed to him "on the cutting edge of the electronic synthesizer sound" that soon would become a staple in mainstream culture. He assessed their music as a mixture of classical music played on synthesizers and "the new pop sound", and described the experience as "mesmerizing". In an interview for Evolution Garden Music Award, Edgar Froese, then-band leader, recalled how he initially rejected the commission, thinking that Friedkin would score The Exorcist II, about which Froese was not enthusiastic. However, upon learning Friedkin intended to reimagine The Wages of Fear, Froese called Friedkin back and asked for video material to be worked on, but Friedkin suggested the band create the score based solely on their impressions of the script, without seeing a single minute of video footage. After initially meeting in Paris, Froese reports Friedkin was delighted with their work; Froese added that they "never had to change anything on that score" and summarized their involvement as "the most uncomplicated work we did for Hollywood". Upon receiving the commissioned audio material, Friedkin was inspired to edit the film according to the music, which he received in a raw, unabridged form.

Friedkin, an admirer of the band, stated in the liner notes for the soundtrack that "[h]ad [he] heard them sooner [he] would have asked them to score [The Exorcist]", and that he considers the film and the score to be "inseparable". Apart from Tangerine Dream's score, some excerpts from Keith Jarrett's Hymns/Spheres were employed. Friedkin also featured one licensed song, "I'll Remember April", by jazz saxophonist Charlie Parker, and a cover version of "So What" by Miles Davis. For the film's screening, Paramount and William Friedkin prepared specific instructions regarding music: they demanded a three-and-half-minute musical overture to be played prior to each screening, and prohibited any alterations to it.

In 2019, the soundtrack was released on green vinyl by Waxwork Records. It included the complete score by Tangerine Dream and liner notes by William Friedkin.

== Release ==
=== Box office ===
When our trailer [for Sorcerer] faded to black, the curtains closed and opened again, and they kept opening and opening, and you started feeling this huge thing coming over your shoulder overwhelming you, and heard this noise, and you went right off into space. It made our film look like this little, amateurish piece of shit. I told Billy [Friedkin], 'We're freaking being blown off the screen. You gotta go see this.'

— Film editor Bud Smith, on his reaction to seeing Star Wars

Paramount Pictures and Universal Pictures reached an agreement in which Paramount would distribute the film in the eastern United States while Universal would distribute the film in the western United States. Sorcerer opened theatrically in the United States on June 24, 1977, and ended up being a box office flop, grossing $5.9 million domestically and $9 million worldwide. Roger Ebert estimated that at the time, the film would have needed a gross of around $45–50m to just "break even". It was released a month after George Lucas's runaway box-office smash of 1977, Star Wars; Mann Theatres wanted to keep Star Wars at Mann's Chinese Theater, but Paramount insisted on the company fulfilling its contract for Sorcerer. Warned by Sorcerer film editor Bud Smith, Friedkin and his wife Jeanne Moreau watched the science-fiction epic at Mann's Chinese Theater and nervously saw the gigantic crowds that attended, knowing that his film would soon replace it. Friedkin's fears were correct; when Sorcerer debuted at the theater, it was so unsuccessful by comparison that Star Wars quickly returned. Friedkin agreed with this assessment during an interview on the Bug DVD.

Several critics theorized that another probable factor in the film's box office failure was the confusion related to its title. Cyriaque Lamar of Cracked.com notes that "[a]udiences expecting mystical weirdness a la The Exorcist walked out of theaters, prompting ads that Sorcerer was 'NOT A FILM ABOUT THE SUPERNATURAL'." Film critic Gene Siskel thought Sorcerer was a "very bad title". To him the title might have indicated a certain likeness to The Exorcist and thought the audiences at the time were either bored with yet another film about exorcisms or that was precisely what they wanted and upon seeing the movie, they got confused, asking themselves "where's the devil?" Siskel also thought each of the production companies would think the other one would handle the promotion, and nobody perceived it as a "sole project of their own, it was dropped in-between them." On the other hand, Roger Ebert expressed his disappointment about the movie's box office performance by saying that "you could make more than that just by opening in the first week, people stumbling into a wrong theater looking for Bruce Lee," as well as blamed Universal and Paramount for the lack of support. Friedkin stated that his attitude throughout the making of the film "alienated the top management of two studios", and as a consequence they did not feel compelled to support it.

YOUR ATTENTION, PLEASE. To dramatize the diverse backgrounds of the principal characters in 'Sorcerer', two of the opening sequences were filmed in the appropriate foreign languages – with sub-titles in English. Other than these opening scenes, 'Sorcerer' is an English language film.

— Disclaimer put on Sorcerer lobby placards.

Furthermore, the opening sixteen minutes contain no English language, which made the audiences think that it was a foreign subtitled film, and caused walk-outs. This prompted movie theatres to put a disclaimer on lobby cards asserting that for the most part, it was an English-language film.

After the film's poor reception, its financial disaster prompted Universal executives to void their contract with Friedkin immediately. Friedkin moved to France with Moreau where he recuperated from a malaria infection contracted during the filming, and wanted to sever ties with American film industry. Despite Sorcerer's failure, in a 2013 interview for The National, Friedkin stated that in retrospect he never stopped believing in the movie: "I measure the success or failure of a film on one thing – how close I came to my vision of it."

=== Critical reception ===
==== Initial reception ====
Sorcerer was not received as well by the public or film critics as Friedkin's previous two films had been. American movie reviewer D. K. Holm hinted that all criticisms might have stemmed from the very fact that Friedkin even dared to reimagine a French classic.

In Leonard Maltin's annual "Movie Guide" ratings book, the film receives only two-and-a-half out of four stars, with the critique, "Expensive remake of The Wages of Fear never really catches hold despite a few astounding scenes." In Leslie Halliwell's Halliwell's Film Guide, the evaluation is even more harsh, and the author found the film "truly insulting", going as far as to say: "Why anyone would want to spend 20 million dollars on a remake of The Wages of Fear, do it badly, and give it a misleading title is anybody's guess. The result is dire." Andrew Sarris in his July 18, 1977, review for The Village Voice summarized the film as "a visual and aural textbook on everything that is wrong with current movies," as well as stating that the movie reset Friedkin's status to the beginning of his career, and compared him unfavourably to Clouzot, John Huston and David Lean, declaring that "he has not come close to matching their craftsmanship." Robert C. Cumbow in the September 1977 issue of Movietone News also panned the film, criticizing camera placement as "faulty", which in his opinion led to substandard exposition. Moreover, he also deemed the film's editing "ridiculous" and thought Sorcerer lacked character involvement. John Marlowe of The Miami News assessed the movie's dialogues unfavourably, stating that "Sorcerer's dialog is kept to such a minimum that not only you don't feel for these four losers, but you never really get to know them." He also considered the film's mixture of realist and surrealist moments as "pain in the mind". Peter Biskind described the film as "self-consciously arty and pretentious [...] fatally trapped between America and Europe, commerce and art," claiming the result represented "the worst of both worlds", as well as noting that the audience of the time was strikingly different from the one that adored The French Connection. Films Illustrated summarized Sorcerer as "below the usual par", in spite of the involvement of reputable lead actor Scheider and a "topnotch director", Friedkin. In the August 1997 issue of The Progressive, Kenneth Turan praised the movie's narrative set-up; however, he thought that in spite of it, it was impossible to attach oneself to the characters. He concluded the review by saying that with "films like this, feeling is everything". One complaint was that some of the scene cuts were too abrupt. Gene Siskel claimed that the characters "seem to be a little cold", as well as expressing an opinion that the special effects overpowered the protagonists.

John Simon wrote of how Friedkin 'spent twenty-one million dollars to perpetrate a film that could be usefully studied in courses on how not to make movies'.

James Monaco praised the cinematography and craftsmanship, and stated that "Friedkin has a commitment to this story", but concluded that "somehow technique overwhelms meaning and emotion". Furthermore, he described the picture as "more restrained" than Friedkin's earlier work, as well as calling it "a grandly naive gesture of self-indulgence," and trivialized his effort to a mere attempt at remaking "his hero Clouzot".

David Badder, in Monthly Film Bulletin, was of the opinion that even if the film had been truncated, it would not improve its quality. He described Sorcerer as "remarkably lacklustre", and did not appreciate the unstable tone of the movie which he called "impenetrably obscure". Additionally, he considered Scheider's role to be severely underdeveloped and "consist[ing] of meaningful stares off camera and mournful grimaces".

On the other hand, Sorcerer garnered some acclaim from several major critics, including the Chicago Sun-Times's Roger Ebert, The New York Times's chief film critic Vincent Canby, and Jack Kroll of Newsweek.

Ebert, in a November 1979 episode of Sneak Previews with Gene Siskel, called the film an "overlooked classic", and was shocked that the film "was so completely overlooked" despite starring Academy Award nominee Roy Scheider and being directed by William Friedkin, an Oscar winner. Furthermore, he stated the movie had "lots of fun" and praised the suspension bridge scene in particular, saying it "is maybe the most astonishing scene of the whole film. It's a combination of desperation, suspense and great special effects as Roy Scheider and his partners try to maneuver a giant truck filled with nitrogliceryne through the heart of this jungle across a suspension bridge." Moreover, he emphasized that Sorcerer was "on a level way above most action pictures," and called it "a labor of love for director William Friedkin," and even went as far as to say that "the jungle scenes, the rain and flood, the fire catastrophe are among the most exciting scenes I've ever seen." As far as the themes are concerned, his impression of Friedkin's intentions was that "he wanted to show human behavior at its extremes; men in torment to complete a life-or-death mission against all odds and discovering their own limits at the same time". Ebert considered Sorcerer one of the top 10 films of 1977.

Canby called Sorcerer "a good little melodrama surrounded by pulp", and praised Scheider's and Cremer's performances, which he thought were "extremely good"; Scheider brought "the dominant note of reckless desperation". On the other hand, he thought the picture "should have been much, much tighter and less cinematically grand". In addition, he thought the movie would benefit from a different title to separate itself from The Exorcist. Kroll, in his Newsweek review, called the movie "the toughest, most relentless American film in a long time".

==== Reassessment ====
The film today is more positively received by professional film critics. On the review-aggregation website Rotten Tomatoes Sorcerer has an 85% rating, with an average score of 7.6 out of 10, based on 55 reviews. The website's critical consensus reads, "Sorcerer, which obstinately motors along on its unpredictable speed, features ambitious sequences of insane white-knuckle tension." On Metacritic the film has a score of 68/100 based on reviews from 13 critics. Numerous outlets noted that Sorcerer is now a subject of critical revaluation and rejuvenated interest, opposed to other less-known films of its era. Certain contemporary critics and artists also declared that Friedkin's adaptation of Wages of Fear novel surpasses that of H. G. Clouzot's. This trend also led to a revisionism of Clouzot's Wages of Fear which is now unfavourably criticized regarding certain aspects in comparison to Friedkin's version.

Film critic Robert C. Cumbow, who heavily criticized the film in Movietone News (September 1977) at the time of release, has since reconsidered his initial thoughts and added an afterword in 2010 where he admits he now "read[s] it with embarrassment" and now recognizes elements he previously identified as "inconclusive" as aspects of "Friedkin's narrative economy, visceral impact, and avoidance of visual cliché"; he closed his remarks that his view was a gradual and a long process.

On March 16, 2001, writer-director Peter Hanson summarized that Sorcerer contrasts with frequent self-indulgence of the 1970s and stated that the film is tremendously thrilling with a great deal of tension which he attributed to the plot's construction as "a probing descent into the psyche of an archetypal character driven insane by circumstance". He also praised the bridge crossing scene and lauded it "one of the most elaborately filmed suspense sequences in cinema history", noting an overwhelming amount of camera set-ups which in his opinion amounted to creating "an exruciating level of tension" and such dedication is palpable throughout the whole film.

American movie reviewer D. K. Holm, in his 2005 book Film Soleil, described the film as "superior to both its model and the novel from which both are loosely taken", as well as deeming the opening vignettes as an "innovation". According to Holm, one of the most prominent threads in Sorcerer is that "coping with frustration is the 'journey' of life", which in his opinion "excellently set[s] up" the cliffhanger finale.

Academy Award nominee, screenwriter and director Josh Olson, most famous for his screenplay for A History of Violence, made a video review of Sorcerer for the Trailers from Hell webseries in 2007. He praised the movie highly, stating that it is Friedkin's best effort ("Sorcerer is Friedkin at the top of his game") and was "at least equal to the original." He also applauded the atmosphere, which he said had "a wonderful tone to it and a real sense of dread and desperation [...] it's tight and suspenseful, every scene grabs you by the collar, and it's beautifully shot. You can feel the humidity down there in South America. You can feel the sweat on the sticks of dynamite." He concluded the review by saying that the only aspect in which the movie failed was the fact that it came out around the same time as Star Wars. Olson felt that "the movie deserved a huge audience" as well as fantasizing that "somewhere there's an alternate universe where Sorcerer is a massive game-changing hit in Hollywood and I'm doing Trailers from Hell commentary on some unknown cult classic called Star Wars. In that world Hollywood has spent the next 30 years making smart, edgy movies for grown-ups, the literacy rate is 100%, we haven't been in a war since Vietnam and world hunger is just a memory."

On August 21, 2009, author Stephen King posted an article in Entertainment Weekly entitled "Stephen King's Reliable Rentals". In his list of "20 [movies] that never disappoint," King placed the original Wages of Fear at #2 and Friedkin's Sorcerer at #1, stating that although Wages of Fear "is considered one of the greatest movies of the modern age", he preferred Sorcerer, and stated that Scheider's Role as Jackie Scanlon was one of the two best roles in his entire career, as well as saying that the film "generate[s] suspense through beautiful simplicity".

A prominent English film critic, Mark Kermode, also expressed his appreciation for the movie, saying that he had "got a fondness for William Friedkin's version of Wages of Fear," adding, however, that "only an idiot would argue that Sorcerer is a better movie than Wages of Fear."

Quentin Tarantino has said, "Sorcerer is to me one of the greatest movies ever made... The bridge scene is just one of the great suspense moments in cinema. It's one of the great filming of sequences. The imagery itself, the editing." However, Tarantino also said that the casting of Roy Scheider in the lead role was a flaw: "He's not bad in the movie. He's not the actor the movie needs. And it's more to the fact the movie needed bigger shoulders to place this type of an epic on... Steve McQueen or Robert Blake, they would have been perfect.

===== Top film lists =====
- 1st – Stephen King, Entertainment Weekly, "20 Movie Rentals That Never Let Me Down"
- 9th – Roger Ebert, Chicago Sun-Times, top 10 films from 1977
- unranked – Quentin Tarantino, 2012 Sight & Sound personal top 12 films poll
- unranked – Benjamin Safdie, 2012 Sight & Sound personal top 10 films poll

=== Accolades ===
Crew members Robert Knudson, Robert Glass, Richard Tyler and Jean-Louis Ducarme were nominated for the Academy Award for Best Sound at the 50th Academy Awards in 1978 for work on this film.

=== International and home releases ===
==== International cuts ====
UK newspaper advert for Sorcerer retitled 'Wages of Fear' in 1978

The film's European as well as Australian cinema release cut 28 minutes from the original (but not in France, where the movie was distributed in its full-length version). In most regions of the world it was also retitled as Wages of Fear and distributed by Cinema International Corporation (later renamed as United International Pictures), a joint venture between Universal and Paramount specifically established for overseas distribution. This version opens in the village with the drivers already present, and ends with the delivery of explosives. The cuts were made by the international distributor Cinema International Corporation, without Friedkin's consent in order to obtain more screenings. Friedkin referred to this cut as a "mutilated" version of his work. The opening vignettes are somewhat retained, albeit heavily shortened and inserted as flashbacks. Although the European cut is shorter, there is almost sixteen minutes of unique footage not shown in the original American theatrical version.

The aforementioned changes were approved by Verna Fields and commissioned to Jim Clark, who reluctantly agreed, and Cynthia Scheider. Fields was a Universal Studios executive who thought shortening and restructuring the movie would increase the film's commercial potential. Scheider was also interested in applying those changes, offering his cooperation. Jim Clark was reportedly assured by Fields that Friedkin permitted changes, but was very suspicious about the authenticity of this claim. Therefore, Clark wrote an indemnity preventing Friedkin from any form of interference. Some additional dialogue written by Clark and Ken Levinson was later dubbed in. The studio did not possess the original work print; hence it was forced to work on the combined print. Jim Clark said the cut was "at best, passable" and was of the opinion that if he "had left Friedkin's version alone, it would have had exactly the same fate."

==== Home media ====
The film's release on video was held up for many years; executives at Paramount and Universal argued it was ownership issues that was preventing a release, though a Universal spokesperson suggested that a lack of public interest might be another reason. A VHS version of Sorcerer was released on October 4, 1990. A laserdisc release followed on December 15, 1990. The DVD was released in the U.S. and Canada on November 17, 1998, and used the laserdisc transfer presented in a 1.33:1 non-widescreen version, which is not its original theatrical aspect ratio; it was shown in cinemas at a ratio of 1.85:1. However, since widescreen televisions have become popular, Friedkin has allowed many of his other films to be released on DVD in their original widescreen formats (The French Connection, Cruising, To Live and Die in L.A.).

==== 2014 US home video re-release and 2017 UK home video release ====
In September 2013, Friedkin announced that new, remastered home video releases on Blu-ray and DVD were supposed to be released on April 14, 2014, however, both ended up being pushed to April 22. While the 2014 Blu-ray release contains a new, digitally remastered version of the movie, its DVD counterpart is simply a reissued version of the previous DVD release, and has not been authorized by Friedkin, who himself disowned it, and advised to avoid purchasing it. Furthermore, the director announced that he would supervise the remastering process for its proper DVD re-release, which hit US stores in August. In the US Blu-ray had no extra features, but was accompanied by a booklet with production stills and an excerpt of Friedkin's memoir The Friedkin Connection, and was well-received upon release, with good reviews praising the quality of the transfer and reaching #1 in drama and # 2 in action/adventure on Amazon.com. In the UK, the Blu-ray was released on November 6, 2017, and included a 74-minute ‘In Conversation’ film with the director, conducted by director Nicolas Winding Refn.

==== 2025 Criterion Collection release ====
Sorcerer was released on Blu-ray and 4K Ultra HD Blu-ray June 24, 2025, by The Criterion Collection. This release, based on a new 4K restoration, marked the film's first release on the 4K Blu-ray format. Supplemental material for the film includes the conversation with Friedkin and Refn from the 2017 UK Blu-ray, a new conversation between filmmaker James Gray and The Ringer editor-in-chief Sean Fennessy, interviews with screenwriter Walon Green and editor Bud Smith, behind-the-scenes footage, an original theatrical trailer, and a printed essay by film critic Justin Chang.

== Legacy ==
Sorcerer's box office flop status had since led to comparisons with other financial failures of the time, particularly Michael Cimino's Heaven's Gate, Francis Ford Coppola's One from the Heart, and Martin Scorsese's New York, New York. Critics argued that the fiasco of these films, among others, contributed to ending a period of auteur approach to the American cinema that was prominent in the 1970s.

In the opinion of several critics, the release of Star Wars marked a distinctive demographic shift among the audiences, as well as altering trends in the movie industry drastically, which at the same time contributed to Sorcerer's financial and critical fiasco. Sean Macaulay notes that Star Wars changed the movie-going demography, considerably "reset[ting] American cinema back to comforting fantasy". According to reviewer Pauline Kael, Star Wars contributed to "infantilizing the audience", as well as "obliterating irony, self-consciousness, and critical reflection", and to Tom Shone, who drew from Kael, was impossible to compete with by Friedkin and Sorcerer. Biskind also thought the American movie-going demographic had changed considerably since The French Connection, and Sorcerer was "too episodic, dark, and star-challenged" to achieve mainstream appreciation. RH Greene argues that Star Wars, which in his opinion was "pure escapism", made intellectually demanding films like Sorcerer obsolete.

Bill Gibron marks the demise of unrestrained writer-director creative control in favor of studio-governed film-making with Heaven's Gate, and adds that Sorcerer also significantly contributed to this trend. Sheldon Hall theorizes that success of films like Jaws and Star Wars set the trends in Hollywood cinema for the decades to come. This was, in contrast to the "subversive attitude" which then journalists heralded as the pinnacle of filmmaking. Hall observes that films such as M*A*S*H, Deliverance, One Flew Over the Cuckoo's Nest, Dog Day Afternoon and All the President's Men "have few equivalents in Hollywood after the 1970s". Furthermore, he states that the last favorable year for New Hollywood was 1976, and "socially critical, stylistically adventurous cinema" would soon be substituted by "ideologically and formally conservative work" of directors like Steven Spielberg and George Lucas. The critic holds the opinion that several financial fiascoes, including Sorcerer, New York, New York, One From the Heart, and Heaven's Gate, were auteur movies aspiring to achieve mainstream success but were panned by the movie-goers and critics alike. This belief is also held by J. Hoberman to whom the period immediately following 1975's One Flew Over the Cuckoo's Nest marked the point when "experimental films became less and less able to recoup their costs".

Justin Wyatt concludes that the downfall of "the experimental period" was followed by a retreat to "large-scale grand filmmaking", a Hollywood staple from early to mid-1960s and adds that filmmakers such as Peter Bogdanovich, Friedkin, and Arthur Penn still continued their cinematic involvement but their most ambitious work had been produced during the peak of New Hollywood era, which was characterized by "financial experimentation". Nat Segaloff observes that cinematic trends presented in Sorcerer were later abandoned by the studio system, an opinion mirrored by Phil Mucci, who holds the opinion that Sorcerer stands for a cinematic style that is unlikely to be seen again". William Friedkin states in the 2003 documentary A Decade Under the Influence that cynicism was a ubiquitous attitude in the country during the 1970s, so the studios were receptive to it, which made "filmmakers and the studio heads be in sync" and added that artistic content was never questioned, only the costs. On the other hand, the director thinks this trend is impossible to return, because he feels that nowadays "a film has to serve the greater good of the corporation in order to get made and it cannot be subversive in nature. As well as, has to have the broadest possible appeal, so that it will help other divisions of the corporation".

Friedkin sat for an interview with the Danish director Nicolas Winding Refn in February 2015, in which they discussed the film at length. It was produced by the French distribution company La Rabbia.

The film was selected for screening as part of the Cannes Classics section at the 2016 Cannes Film Festival.

In 2017, Friedkin described Sorcerer as "the only film I’ve made that I can still watch."

== Court case, restoration, and re-release ==
In April 2012, it was reported that Friedkin was suing Universal and Paramount over the domestic rights of Sorcerer for a share of the movie's profits. In a July 2012 interview, Friedkin said that the film's case was pending at the Ninth District Court of Appeals in California with a settlement to be announced by November 26. Had no settlement been reached by that time, the jury would have to set a trial date for March 2013. The director emphasized that his intent was not dictated by profits but by the desire to have it released on DVD and Blu-ray, and to have a film print for various outlets, such as film societies and universities. He also noted that if the case were to become precedential, he hoped it would help other pictures in a similar situation.

In a July 2012 interview, Friedkin said Universal and Paramount both claimed they did not own the film and did not know who did, a consequence of the bankruptcy of Cinema International Corporation, a company granted an ownership by Universal Studios and Paramount Pictures, and commissioned to release films in international markets. Friedkin said he believed any issues related to the matter were of bookkeeping nature.

In December 2012, Friedkin revealed that the film rights were in fact owned by Universal, as the Paramount lease had expired after 25 years. He also added he would meet Warner Bros., which wanted a sublease, and also announced that he would be meeting with the head of Universal Studios; if the outcome was negative, he would have to resort to a legal case. Friedkin also indicated that restoration of Sorcerer would require a considerable amount of work, stating that he did not, at the time, possess any prints of good quality. He added that Paramount had made a print around the beginning of 2012, which was shown at the American Cinematheque's Aero Theatre, and he was trying to locate it, noting difficulties related to obtaining the print as the studio no longer possessed an adequate capacity to deal with the matter, and off-shore companies involved in the legal matters were now greatly reduced in staff. He said that was why acquiring the film's print was time-consuming.

On February 11, 2013, Friedkin announced that money had been budgeted to create a new, digital master copy of Sorcerer. He also asserted that the original negative is in a good state. He followed this with a statement that The Criterion Collection would not be the film's publisher.

In March 2013, Friedkin revealed that he had dropped his lawsuit against Universal and Paramount, and that he and a "major studio" were involved in the creation of a new, recolored digital print of Sorcerer, to be tentatively screened at the Venice Film Festival and to receive a Blu-ray release:

We're working off the original negative, which is in pretty good shape, but without changing the original concept we have to bring it back in terms of color saturation, sharpness and all the stuff... The film been in a legal whirlpool for 30 or 35 years. And a lot of people have come and gone from the studios during that time, so it just takes awhile to unravel everything, but we're very close to announcing a premiere date.

On April 14, 2013, the aforementioned 35 mm print of Sorcerer from the Paramount archives was screened at the Chicago Film Critics Association's first annual film festival, with Friedkin in attendance. He remarked that the film "hasn't dated... It's set in a kind of limbo and neither the haircuts nor the wardrobes nor the sets have aged poorly."

On May 2, 2013, the director announced the pending re-release, a new, digital print, and a premiere at the Venice Film Festival on August 29. where he would also receive a lifetime achievement award.

Restoration of the print was supervised by Friedkin himself, along with Ned Price and a colorist, Bryan McMahan, Friedkin's collaborator since 1994. In addition, Friedkin also confirmed there would be DVD and Blu-ray disc releases. Friedkin also stated that Warner Bros. financed the restoration, and that the distribution rights would be split between Paramount for theatrical, Warner Bros. for home and streaming media, and Universal for television. According to Friedkin, making of the new print was to commence in June 2013. The director described his efforts to restore and re-release Sorcerer as "a truly Lazarus moment" and said he was gratified that "it’s going to have a new life in cinema".

On June 4, 2013, the director declared that the color grading would commence on June 10, 2013, which said was completed by June 25. There was no distortion of original colors, he said, and a 5.1 surround sound transfer was planned for June 28, 2013. Moreover, he also revealed an audio commentary and extra features would be part of the Blu-ray release. On July 17, 2013, Friedkin announced that the film's soundtrack has been remastered. Two days before the Venice screening, Friedkin announced that a theatrical screening had been booked at Los Angeles' Cinefamily for spring 2014. On September 12, 2013, Friedkin revealed April 14, 2014 would be the release date of the film's Blu-ray home video version.
