= The Wages of Fear (2024 film) =

- English-language promotional poster
- Directed by: Julien Leclercq
- Written by: Julien Leclercq; Hamid Hlioua
- Based on: The Wages of Fear (1953 film) by Henri-Georges Clouzot Jérome Geronimi; The Wages of Fear (1950 novel) by Georges Arnaud
- Produced by: Mikael Govciyan; Julien Madon; Julien Leclercq; Nathalie Toulza Madar
- Starring: Franck Gastambide; Ana Girardot; Alban Lenoir; Sofiane Zermani
- Music by: Éric Serra
- Production companies: Labyrinth Films; TF1 Studio; TF1
- Distributed by: Netflix
- Release date: March 29, 2024
- Running time: 106 min
- Country: France
- Languages: French; Arabic
- Budget: €16,600,000

The Wages of Fear is a 2024 French action thriller film directed and co-written by Julien Leclercq, and starring Franck Gastambide, Ana Girardot, Alban Lenoir and Sofiane Zermani. It is a remake of the 1953 film by Henri-Georges Clouzot, in turn based on the 1950 novel by Georges Arnaud. It was released on March 29, 2024 on Netflix.

== Plot ==
In a desert nation undergoing revolutionary upheaval, four mercenary adventurers are commissioned by an oil corporation to undertake a high-stakes logistical operation. Their objective is to transport nitroglycerin, securely loaded onto two trucks, to extinguish a massive oil well fire threatening a refugee camp housing approximately 5,000 individuals, including the family of one of the operatives.

The mission requires traversing several hundred kilometers of hazardous desert terrain while circumventing numerous obstacles and dangers. In exchange for the successful completion of this perilous task, the mercenaries are offered substantial financial compensation.

== Cast ==
- Franck Gastambide as Fred
- Ana Girardot as Clara
- Alban Lenoir as Alex
- Sofiane Zermani as Gauthier
- Bakary Diombera as Djibril
- Astrid Whettnall as Anne Marchand
- Alka Matewa as Alka
- Sarah Afchain as Assia
- Ghita Berdai as Malya

== Production ==
The project was announced in April 2023. In the official statement, the writer-director declared: "Bringing this talent together for the reboot of such a film—for a global release on Netflix—compels me to pour my heart and soul into it. The ambition is immense."

=== Filming ===
Filming took place in Morocco over 60 days in early 2023.

== Reception ==
Chase Hutchinson of Collider stated: "While it was unlikely that this remake would ever come close to the original, which was itself based on a novel, just how far short it falls is almost impressive. The action, more built around sporadic shootouts and forced hand-to-hand fight sequences, is never even remotely thrilling... It is like a chasm is being opened up before us where you can see the brilliant heights of Clouzot’s film and the dire depths that this one just keeps falling further into. By the time it hits rock bottom, you’re just glad it's over."

Padraig Cotter of Screen Rant wrote: "The Wages of Fear isn't terribly emotional and plays like a cross between a Fast and Furious movie and an extended Call of Duty mission. Still, in keeping with its Fast and Furious inspiration, family drama plays an important role."

On the review aggregator website Rotten Tomatoes, 20% of 10 critics' reviews are positive.
