= Thriller (genre) =

Genre of literature, film, and television

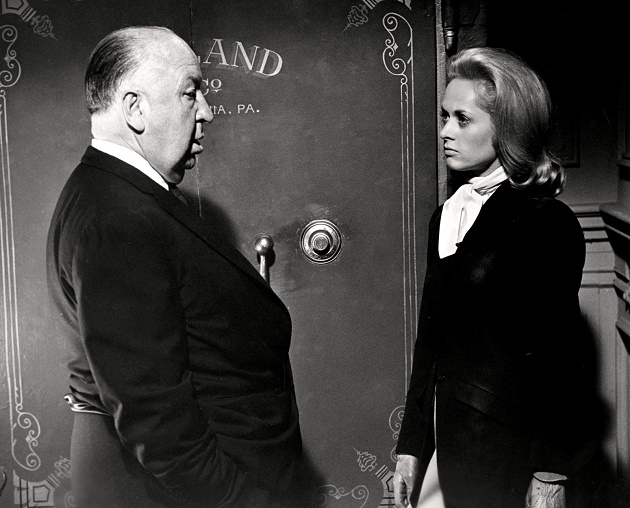
British director Alfred Hitchcock, known for his influences on action and suspense in film, appears alongside American actress Tippi Hedren, who starred in his acclaimed thriller movies The Birds (1963) and Marnie (1964).

Thriller is a genre of fiction with numerous, often overlapping, subgenres, including crime, horror, and detective fiction. Thrillers are characterized and defined by the moods they elicit, giving their audiences heightened feelings of suspense, excitement, surprise, anticipation and anxiety. This genre is well suited for making thriller films and television programs.

A thriller generally keeps its audience on the "edge of their seats" as the plot builds towards a climax. The cover-up of important information is a common element. Literary devices such as red herrings, plot twists, unreliable narrators, and cliffhangers are used extensively. A thriller is often a villain-driven plot, whereby they present obstacles that the protagonist or hero must overcome.

Roots of the genre date back hundreds of years, but it began to develop as a distinct style in the 19th century and the early 20th century with novels like The Count of Monte Cristo (1848) and The Thirty-Nine Steps (1915). The films of Alfred Hitchcock are critical in the development of the thriller film during the mid-20th century. Some popular 21st-century mainstream examples include The Girl with the Dragon Tattoo, Gone Girl, The Girl on the Train, The Woman in the Window, and the British television series Utopia.

== Characteristics ==
Writer Vladimir Nabokov, in his lectures at Cornell University, said:

In an Anglo-Saxon thriller, the villain is generally punished, and the strong silent man generally wins the weak babbling girl, but there is no governmental law in Western countries to ban a story that does not comply with a fond tradition, so that we always hope that the wicked but romantic fellow will escape scot-free and the good but dull chap will be finally snubbed by the moody heroine.

Thrillers may be defined by the primary mood that they elicit: suspenseful excitement. In short, if it "thrills", it is a thriller. As the introduction to a major anthology says:

...Thrillers provide such a rich literary feast. There are all kinds. The legal thriller, spy thriller, action-adventure thriller, medical thriller, police thriller, romantic thriller, historical thriller, political thriller, religious thriller, high-tech thriller, military thriller. The list goes on and on, with new variations constantly being invented. In fact, this openness to expansion is one of the genre's most enduring characteristics. But what gives the variety of thrillers a common ground is the intensity of emotions they create, particularly those of apprehension and exhilaration, of excitement and breathlessness, all designed to generate that all-important thrill. By definition, if a thriller doesn't thrill, it's not doing its job.

— James Patterson, June 2006, "Introduction", Thriller

=== Suspense ===
Suspense is a crucial characteristic of the thriller genre. It gives the viewer a feeling of pleasurable fascination and excitement mixed with apprehension, anticipation, and tension. These develop from unpredictable, mysterious, and rousing events during the narrative, which makes the viewer or reader think about the outcome of certain actions. Suspense builds in order to make those final moments, no matter how short, the most memorable. The suspense in a story keeps the person hooked to reading or watching more until the climax is reached.

In terms of narrative expectations, it may be contrasted with curiosity and surprise. The objective is to deliver a story with sustained tension, surprise, and a constant sense of impending doom. As described by film director Alfred Hitchcock, an audience experiences suspense when they expect something bad to happen and have (or believe they have) a superior perspective on events in the drama's hierarchy of knowledge, yet they are powerless to intervene to prevent it from happening.

Suspense in thrillers is often intertwined with hope and anxiety, which are treated as two emotions aroused in anticipation of the conclusion - the hope that things will turn out all right for the appropriate characters in the story, and the fear that they may not. The second type of suspense is the "...anticipation wherein we either know or else are fairly certain about what is going to happen but are still aroused in anticipation of its actual occurrence."

According to Greek philosopher Aristotle in his book Poetics, suspense is an important building block of literature, and this is an important convention in the thriller genre.

Thriller music has been shown to create distrust and ominous uncertainty between the viewer of a film and the character on screen at the time when the music is playing.

=== Themes and characters ===
Common methods and themes in crime and action thrillers are ransoms, captivities, heists, revenge, and kidnappings. Common in mystery thrillers are investigations and the whodunit technique. Common elements in dramatic and psychological thrillers include plot twists, psychology, obsession and mind games. Common elements of science-fiction thrillers are killing robots, machines or aliens, mad scientists and experiments. Common in horror thrillers are serial killers, stalking, deathtraps and horror-of-personality. Elements such as fringe theories, false accusations and paranoia are common in paranoid thrillers. Threats to entire countries, spies, espionage, conspiracies, assassins and electronic surveillance are common in spy thrillers.

Characters may include criminals, stalkers, assassins, innocent victims (often on the run), menaced women, psychotic individuals, spree killers, sociopaths, agents, terrorists, police, escaped convicts, private eyes, people involved in twisted relationships, world-weary men and women, psycho-fiends, and more. The themes frequently include terrorism, political conspiracy, pursuit, or romantic triangles leading to murder. Plots of thrillers involve characters which come into conflict with each other or with outside forces.

The protagonist of these films is set against a problem. No matter what subgenre a thriller film falls into, it will emphasize the danger that the protagonist faces. The protagonists are frequently ordinary citizens unaccustomed to danger, although commonly in crime and action thrillers, they may also be "hard men" accustomed to danger such as police officers and detectives. While protagonists of thrillers have traditionally been men, women lead characters are increasingly common. In psychological thrillers, the protagonists are reliant on their mental resources, whether it be by battling wits with the antagonist or by battling for equilibrium in the character's own mind. The suspense often comes from two or more characters preying upon one another's minds, either by playing deceptive games with the other or by merely trying to demolish the other's mental state.

=== Story and setting ===
An atmosphere of menace and sudden violence, such as crime and murder, characterize thrillers. The tension usually arises when the character(s) is placed in a dangerous situation, or a trap from which escaping seems impossible. Life is threatened, usually because the principal character is unsuspectingly or unknowingly involved in a dangerous or potentially deadly situation.

Hitchcock's films often placed an innocent victim (an average, responsible person) into a strange, life-threatening or terrorizing situation, in a case of mistaken identity or wrongful accusation.

Thrillers take place mostly in ordinary suburbs and cities, although sometimes they may take place wholly or partly in exotic settings such as foreign cities, deserts, polar regions, or the high seas. These usually tough, resourceful, but essentially ordinary heroes are pitted against villains determined to destroy them, their country, or the stability of the Free World (especially if it is set during the Cold War). Often in a thriller movie, the protagonist is faced with what seem to be insurmountable problems in his mission, carried out against a ticking clock, the stakes are high and although resourceful, they face personal dilemmas along the way forcing them to make sacrifices for others.

== History in literature ==
The Three Apples, a tale in the One Thousand and One Nights (Arabian Nights), is a murder mystery with multiple plot twists and detective fiction elements. In this tale, a fisherman discovers a heavy, locked chest on the banks of the Tigris river and sells it to the Abbasid Caliph, Harun al-Rashid, who has it broken open - only to discover inside it the dismembered body of a young woman. Harun then orders his vizier, Ja'far ibn Yahya, to solve the crime and find the murderer within three days. This whodunit mystery has also been considered a detective story, though it lacks a sleuth.

The Count of Monte Cristo (1844) is a swashbuckling revenge thriller about a man named Edmond Dantès who is betrayed by his friends and sent to languish in the notorious Château d'If. His only companion is an old man who teaches him everything from philosophy to mathematics to swordplay. Just before the old man dies, he reveals to Dantès the secret location of a great treasure. Shortly after, Dantès engineers a daring escape and uses the treasure to reinvent himself as the Count of Monte Cristo. Thirsting for vengeance, he sets out to punish those who destroyed his life.

The first recognizable modern thriller was Erskine Childers' The Riddle of the Sands (1903), in which two young Englishmen stumble upon a secret German armada preparing to invade their homeland.

The Thirty-Nine Steps (1915) is an early detective thriller by John Buchan, in which an innocent man becomes the prime suspect in a murder case and finds himself on the run from both the police and enemy spies.

Fritz Lang's M (1931) is regarded as a groundbreaking psychological thriller, introducing innovative suspense-enhancing audiovisual techniques that have become standard and ubiquitous ever since.

The Spy Who Came in from the Cold (1963) by John le Carré is set in the world of Cold War espionage and helped to usher in an era of thriller fiction based around professional spies and the battle of wits between rival spymasters.

== See also ==
- Adventure fiction
- Crime fiction
- Giallo
- Horror and terror
- International Thriller Writers
- List of thriller films
- List of thriller writers
- Spy fiction
- Suspense
