= List of science fiction thriller films =

This is a list of science fiction thriller films.

== 0–9 ==
- 10 Cloverfield Lane
- 12 Monkeys
- 2012
- 24
- The 5th Wave

== A ==
- Air
- Alien Hunter
- Aliens
- The Andromeda Strain
- The Astronaut's Wife

== B ==
- Bombshell
- A Boy and His Dog
- The Butterfly Effect
- The Butterfly Effect 2
- The Butterfly Effect 3: Revelations

== C ==
- Captain America: Civil War
- Cell
- Chain Reaction
- Children of Men
- Christmas Icetastrophe
- Chronicle
- The Cloverfield Paradox
- Colossus: The Forbin Project
- Coma
- Cypher

== D ==
- The Darkest Hour
- Darkman
- The Day of the Dolphin
- Déjà Vu
- Disclosure Day
- District 9
- Diverge
- Doom
- Doomwatch
- Doppelgänger

== E ==
- Ex Machina

== F ==
- Final Fantasy VII: Advent Children
- The Final Programme
- Firestarter
- Frequency
- Friend of the World

== G ==
- Geostorm
- Ghost in the Shell
- Gravity

== H ==
- The Host
- The Hunger Games
- The Hunger Games: Catching Fire
- The Hunger Games: Mockingjay – Part 1
- The Hunger Games: Mockingjay – Part 2

== I ==
- In Time
- Inception
- Infected (2008)
- Interstellar
- The Invasion

== J ==
- Jurassic Park

== K ==
- The Kindred (1987)
- Kingsglaive: Final Fantasy XV (2016)
- Knowing (2009)

== L ==
- Life
- The Lobster
- Looper

== M ==
- Marooned (1969)
- The Matrix (1999)
  - The Matrix Reloaded (2003)
  - The Matrix Revolutions (2003)
  - The Matrix Resurrections (2021)
- The Maze Runner (2014)
  - Maze Runner: The Scorch Trials (2015)
  - Maze Runner: The Death Cure (2018)
- Megaville (1990)
- Minority Report (2002)
- Monolith (2022)
- M3GAN

== O ==
- Okja (2017)
- OtherLife (2017)

== P ==
- Pandemic
- Pitch Black
- Project Almanac
- Project X (1987)

== R ==
- Race to Witch Mountain
- Red Planet
- RoboCop (2014)

== S ==
- S. Darko (2009)
- The Signal (2014)
- Signs (2002)
- Silent Warnings (2003)
- Skyline (2010)
- Songbird (2020)
- A Sound of Thunder (2005)
- Source Code (2011)
- Southbound (2015)
- Storm (1999)
- Super 8 (2011)

== T ==
- The Terminator
- Terminator 2: Judgment Day
- Terminator 3: Rise of the Machines
- They Crawl
- The Thirteenth Floor
- Time Renegades
- Time Teens
- Timing

== V ==
- Vanilla Sky

== W ==
- Westworld
- WXIII: Patlabor the Movie 3

== X ==
- XChange (2000)

== See also ==
- List of comic science fiction films
- List of science fiction films
- Lists of thriller films
- List of science fiction horror films
- List of science fiction action films
