= Gilberto Amado =

Brazilian writer, lawyer and academic (1887-1969)

c. 1955

Gilberto de Lima Azevedo Sousa Ferreira Amado de Faria (May 7, 1887 – August 27, 1969) was a Brazilian poet, diplomat, jurist, politician, and professor. He is best remembered for his cycle of memoirs, which includes the books História de minha infância (1955), Minha formação no Recife (1955), Mocidade no Rio e primeira viagem à Europa (1956), Presença na política (1958), and Depois da política (1960).

== Biography ==
=== Early years ===
Born in Estância into a large family with literary traditions, he was one of fourteen siblings, including the playwright Genolino and the radio broadcaster Gilson, and was a cousin of the novelist Jorge Amado. After being taught to read and write by his mother, Amado enrolled at the Atheneu Sergipano, where he completed his secondary education. In 1902, he entered the Faculty of Medicine of Bahia to study pharmacy, graduating the following year. Shortly thereafter, he was appointed a teacher of natural sciences at the Escola Normal de Sergipe.

Amado began his journalistic career while a student at the Faculty of Law of Recife, writing a daily column for Diário de Pernambuco. His contemporaries included the writer José Américo de Almeida (class of 1908) and the jurist Pontes de Miranda (class of 1911). Around this time, he was a promoter of the works of Friedrich Nietzsche and took part in several discussions surrounding the philosopher. Among his influences, he mentions Johann Wolfgang von Goethe, Auguste Comte, Euclides da Cunha, and Immanuel Kant, as well as Direito das coisas, a treatise on private law by Lafayette Rodrigues, which he regarded, from a literary perspective, as ''one of the most perfect'' works written in Brazilian Portuguese.

=== Career ===
Once graduated, Amado moved to Rio de Janeiro to work as a journalist, writing articles on literary criticism for Jornal do Commercio. A study on the poet Luiz Delfino earned him recognition in Rio's literary circles, and he was hired to work at A Imprensa and O Paiz, where he maintained a weekly column. In 1911, he returned to Recife to become a substitute professor of criminal law at his alma mater. The following year, he unsuccessfully ran for federal deputy and was then assigned by the government to go on a study expedition in Europe, where he observed the political and colonial systems of European countries, with particular attention to the Netherlands. The travel left a profound impression on Amado, who later wrote: ''Europe is enveloped in a dense atmosphere whose layers represent centuries. England is built upon Roman stones. A street in Paris is a river flowing from Greece''. In The Hague, he made acquaintance with Graça Aranha, at the time one of the most influential writers in Brazil.

In 1914, he applied for membership at the Brazilian Academy of Letters with his book of essays A chave de Salomão, with no success. The following year, he was elected federal deputy for his home state of Sergipe. On June 19, 1915, during a ceremony organized by Olavo Bilac and attended by important literary figures from Rio de Janeiro, Amado shot and killed the poet Aníbal Teófilo, who was engaged in a physical altercation with Amado's friend Paulo Hasslocher and with whom he had a personal dispute.

Despite attempting to flee the scene, Amado was identified by a police officer and arrested. He remained imprisoned for a year until his judgement, in which he was acquitted by jury. His lawyer Evaristo de Moraes, who had previously defended Dilermando de Assis, the killer of Euclides da Cunha, alleged that Amado was an ''emotional'' person who had acted while deprived of his sentidos, meaning his ''consciousness'' or ''reason''. The prosecutors appealed the decision, but Amado was once again acquitted.

The episode affected Amado's reputation and public image, as it received extensive media coverage. Nonetheless, he resumed his journalistic activities, becoming editor-in-chief of the newspaper A Época in 1919, and his political career, being reelected as federal deputy for Sergipe. Around this time, he worked at the Commission of Diplomacy and Treatises. In 1927, he was elected senator for Sergipe, but his term was interrupted by the Revolution of 1930. It was during this period that he began turning his attention to international law and commerce, participating in several commissions across Europe.

On October 3, 1963, after completing his cycle of memoirs, Amado was elected to the Brazilian Academy of Letters, succeeding Ribeiro Couto and being formally received by the literary critic Alceu Amoroso Lima.

==== Diplomacy ====
In 1934, Amado, then an established jurist, was appointed legal advisor to the Ministry of Foreign Affairs, taking over the position previously held by Clóvis Beviláqua. His career progressed as he served as ambassador in Santiago (1936), Helsinki (1938-39), Rome (1939-42), and Bern (1942-43).

=== Personal life ===
Amado was married to Alice do Rego Barros Gibson, with whom he had the French-Brazilian actress Véra Clouzot. By virtue of his marriage, he was brother-in-law of the journalist Tomé Gibson. He died in Rio de Janeiro on August 27 1969, aged 82.

== Works ==
=== Essays and studies ===
- A chave de Salomão (1914)
- Grão de areia (1919)
- Aparência e realidades (1920)
- As instituições políticas e o meio social do Brasil (1924)
- Espírito do nosso tempo (1932)
- A dança sobre o abismo (1932)
- Eleição e representação (1932)

=== Poetry ===
- Suave ascensão (1917)

=== Memoirs ===
- História de minha infância (1955)
- Minha formação no Recife (1955)
- Mocidade no Rio e primeira viagem à Europa (1956)
- Presença na política (1958)
- Depois da política (1960)

=== Novels ===
- Inocentes e culpados (1914)
- Os interesses da companhia (1942)

=== Crônicas and travel literature ===
- Dias e horas de vibração (1933)
- Impressões de viagem (1933)
