= The Wages of Fear =

1953 thriller film by Henri-Georges Clouzot

- Promotional poster
- French: Le Salaire de la peur
- Directed by: Henri-Georges Clouzot
- Screenplay by: Henri-Georges Clouzot; Jérome Geronimi
- Based on: The Wages of Fear by Georges Arnaud
- Produced by: Raymond Borderie; Henri-Georges Clouzot
- Starring: Yves Montand; Charles Vanel; Folco Lulli; Peter Van Eyck; Véra Clouzot
- Cinematography: Armand Thirard
- Edited by: Madeleine Gug
- Music by: Georges Auric
- Production company: Vera Film; Filmsonor; C.I.C.C.; Fono Roma
- Distributed by: Cinédis (France); CEI Incom (Italy)
- Release date: 22 April 1953
- Running time: 156 minutes
- Countries: France; Italy
- Languages: French; Spanish; English; Italian
- Box office: 6,944,306 admissions

The Wages of Fear (French: Le Salaire de la peur (Note: The title is sometimes also translated as "The Salary of Fear")) is a 1953 thriller film directed, co-written, and co-produced by Henri-Georges Clouzot, adapted from Georges Arnaud's 1950 novel of the same name, and starring Yves Montand, Charles Vanel, Peter van Eyck and Véra Clouzot. The film centres on a group of four down-on-their-luck European men who are hired by an American oil company to drive two trucks, loaded with nitroglycerin needed to extinguish an oil well fire, over mountain dirt roads.

The film brought Clouzot international fame—winning both the Golden Bear and the Palme d'Or at the 1953 Berlin Film Festival and Cannes Film Festival, respectively—and enabled him to direct Les Diaboliques (1955). In France, it was the fourth highest-grossing film of the year with a total of nearly 7 million admissions. Retrospective reviews have also been highly positive, in 2019, the film was ranked No. 9 in Empire's "The 100 Best Films of World Cinema."

== Plot ==
Frenchmen Mario and Jo, German Bimba and Italian Luigi are stuck in the isolated South American town of Las Piedras. Surrounded by desert, the town is linked to the outside world only by an airstrip, but the airfare is beyond the means of the men. There is little opportunity for employment aside from the American corporation that dominates the town, Southern Oil Company (SOC), which operates the nearby oil fields and owns a walled compound within the town. SOC exploits local workers and takes the law into its own hands, but the townspeople depend on it and suffer in silence.

Mario is a sarcastic Corsican playboy who treats his devoted lover, Linda, with disdain. Jo is an aging ex-gangster who recently found himself stranded in the town. Bimba is an intense, quiet man whose father was murdered by the Nazis and who had to work as a forced laborer for three years in a salt mine. Luigi, Mario's roommate, is a jovial, hardworking man, who has just learned that he is dying from cement dust in his lungs. Mario befriends Jo due to their common background, having lived in Paris, but a rift develops between Jo and the other cantina regulars due to his combative, arrogant personality.

A large fire erupts at one of the SOC oil fields. The only way to extinguish the flames and cap the well is an explosion produced by nitroglycerin. With short notice and lack of proper equipment, it must be transported within jerrycans placed in two large trucks from the SOC headquarters, 500 km (300 miles) away. Due to the poor condition of the roads and the highly volatile nature of nitroglycerin, the job is considered too dangerous for the unionized SOC employees.

The company foreman, Bill O'Brien, recruits truck drivers from the local community. Despite the dangers, many of the locals volunteer, lured by the high pay: US$2,000 per driver. This is a fortune to them, perhaps the only way out of their dead-end lives. The pool of applicants is narrowed down to four drivers: Mario, Bimba and Luigi are chosen, along with a German named Smerloff. Smerloff fails to appear on the appointed day, so Jo, who knows O'Brien from his bootlegging days, takes his place. The other drivers suspect that Jo intimidated Smerloff in some way to facilitate his own hiring.

Jo and Mario transport the nitroglycerin in one vehicle; Luigi and Bimba are in the other, with thirty minutes separating them in order to limit potential casualties. The drivers are forced to deal with a series of physical and mental obstacles, including a stretch of extremely rough road called "the washboard", a construction barricade that forces them to teeter around a rotten platform above a precipice, and a boulder blocking the road. Jo finds that his nerves are not what they used to be, and the others confront Jo about his increasing cowardice. Finally, Luigi and Bimba's truck explodes without warning, killing them both.

Mario and Jo arrive at the scene of the explosion only to find a large crater rapidly filling with oil from a pipeline ruptured in the blast. Jo exits the vehicle to help Mario navigate through the oil-filled crater. The truck, however, is in danger of becoming bogged down and, during their frantic attempts to prevent it from getting stuck, Mario runs over Jo. Although the vehicle is ultimately freed from the muck, Jo is mortally injured. On their arrival at the oil field, Mario and Jo are hailed as heroes, but Jo is dead and Mario collapses from exhaustion. Upon his recovery, he heads home in the same truck. He collects double the wages following his friends' deaths and refuses the chauffeur offered by SOC. Mario jubilantly drives down a mountain road as a party is being held at the cantina back in town, where Mario's friends eagerly await his arrival. He swerves recklessly and intentionally, having cheated death so many times on the same road. Linda, dancing in the cantina, faints. Mario takes a corner too fast and plunges through the guardrail to his death.

== Cast ==
- Yves Montand as Mario, a playboy originally from Corsica.
- Charles Vanel as Jo, an older man from Paris, and the only other Frenchman in Las Piedras. He is implied to have ties to organized crime.
- Folco Lulli as Luigi, a cook from Italy and Mario's roommate, who learns he is suffering from a pulmonary embolism.
- Peter van Eyck as Bimba, a mysterious, laconic man from Germany. During the Second World War, he spent three years in a forced labor camp while his father was murdered by Nazis.
- Véra Clouzot as Linda, a local cantina worker and Mario's devoted lover. Clouzot is the director's wife.
- William Tubbs as Bill O'Brien, a foreman for the Southern Oil Company (SOC).
- Darío Moreno as Hernandez, the proprietor of the local cantina.
- Jo Dest as Hans Smerloff
- Luis De Lima as Bernardo
- Josep Palau i Fabre as Rodrigo
- Grégoire Gromoff as Kostya
- Antonio Centa as Camp Chief
- Darling Légitimus as Rosa
- Charles Fernley Fawcett as Bradley
- Jeronimo Mitchell as Dick

== Production ==
Jean Gabin declined the role of Jo, feeling such a cowardly character would hurt his career. Both Gérard Philipe and Serge Reggiani were considered to play Mario, before Yves Montand was cast.

Clouzot originally wanted to film on-location in Guatemala, but budgetary limitations confined shooting to continental Europe. Montand flatly rejected proposals to film in Almería, Spain, due to his opposition to the Francoist regime. Ultimately, filming took place mainly in the Gard department of Occitania. The town of "Las Piedras" was a set constructed in Arles, Provence-Alpes-Côte d'Azur. A lengthy section of the film was shot in the Bambouseraie de Prafrance, due to its exotic vegetation.

Production was beset with numerous issues. Financing issues meant filming broke for seven months after only a half-hour was completed. Filming was delayed again by torrential rain; this led the cast and crew to be held up in a Nîmes hotel for over a month. Clouzot broke his ankle. Several dozen local Romani hired as extras went on strike. The pyrotechnics used in the oil fire sequence nearly started a wildfire.

== Reception ==
=== Critical response ===
The Wages of Fear was critically hailed upon its original release. Bosley Crowther of The New York Times wrote, "The excitement derives entirely from the awareness of nitroglycerine and the gingerly, breathless handling of it. You sit there waiting for the theatre to explode". The film was also a commercial success, selling 6,944,306 tickets in France where it was the fourth highest earning film of the year.

In 1982, Pauline Kael called it "an existential thriller—the most original and shocking French melodrama of the 50s. ... When you can be blown up at any moment only a fool believes that character determines fate. ... If this isn't a parable of man's position in the modern world, it's at least an illustration of it. ... The violence is not used simply for excitement--it's used as in Eisenstein's and Buñuel's films: to force a vision of human experience." In 1992, Roger Ebert stated that "The film's extended suspense sequences deserve a place among the great stretches of cinema." Leonard Maltin awarded the film 3 1/2 out of 4 stars, calling it a "marvelously gritty and extremely suspenseful epic".

=== Retrospective views ===
The website Rotten Tomatoes reported that 100% of critics have given the film a positive review based on 50 reviews, with a weighted average of 9.3/10. Its critics consensus reads: "An existential suspense classic, The Wages of Fear blends nonstop suspense with biting satire; its influence is still being felt on today's thrillers." Metacritic reports a score of 85 out of 100 based on 15 critic reviews, indicating "universal acclaim".

In 2019, the film was ranked No. 9 in Empire's "The 100 Best Films Of World Cinema."

Christopher Nolan cited The Wages of Fear as a notable influence on his film Dunkirk (2017).

=== Awards and nominations ===
Institution	Year	Category	Nominee	Result	Ref.
Berlin International Film Festival	1953	Golden Bear	Henri-Georges Clouzot	Won	
Blue Ribbon Awards	1955	Best Foreign Language Film	Henri-Georges Clouzot	Won	
British Academy Film Awards	1955	Best Film	The Wages of Fear	Won	
Cannes Film Festival	1953	Palme d'Or	Henri-Georges Clouzot	Won	
Cannes Film Festival	1953	Special Mention	Charles Vanel	Won	
French Syndicate of Cinema Critics	1954	Best Film	Henri-Georges Clouzot	Won	
Kinema Junpo Awards	1955	Best Foreign Language Film	Henri-Georges Clouzot	Nominated	

== Restoration and home video ==
One of the best known and most successful of Clouzot's films, The Wages of Fear has been widely released on every home video format. However, with the exception of a French DVD (TF1 Vidéo, 2001) featuring the original 153-minute French theatrical version, until recently most releases contained a slightly edited 148-minute version. A comprehensive 4K restoration, based on the original negative, was completed by TF1 Studio in 2017. The 4K colour correction was carried out by Jérôme Bigueur under the supervision of Guillaume Schiffman. It has greatly improved audio and video quality. The film has been released on Blu-ray, DVD and DCP in France (TF1 Vidéo), the UK (BFI), and Japan (IVC).

The film was colourised in 1996 with the approval of Clouzot's daughter. It was subsequently broadcast on French television+ and released on French VHS.

In 2025 The Criterion Collection released the newly restored 153-minute version of the film in two formats: 4k and Blu-ray on two BD discs. This edition is praised for its superior quality. The Criterion Collection 2025 release includes a booklet with a foreword by Dennis Lehane and several video interviews: with the leading actor Yves Montand, with director Clouzot, and a 22-minute video interview about the film with the assistant director Michel Romanoff.

== Remakes ==
- Violent Road (1958, dir. Howard W. Koch) – a low-budget American film starring Brian Keith, though it is not credited as such.
- Sorcerer (1977, dir. William Friedkin) – a higher-budget American film starring Roy Scheider. Friedkin described it as an adaptation of the original novel. The French release of the film used the original novel's title.
- The Wages of Fear (2024, dir. Julien Leclercq) – a French Netflix production starring Franck Gastambide. It credits both the original novel and the 1953 film as source material.

Additionally, the plot was adapted for an episode of the 1980s American TV series MacGyver, "Hellfire" (S01E08).
