= John M. Stephens =

American cinematographer

- Born: John Morley Stephens; November 17, 1932; Valparaiso, Indiana, U.S.
- Died: June 18, 2015 (aged 82); Orange County, California, U.S.
- Occupations: Cinematographer, camera operator

John Morley Stephens (November 17, 1932 - June 18, 2015) was an American cinematographer, known for his innovative action photography.

He pioneered a number of cinematographic devices, including the body camera mount for the 1966 film Seconds, and the world's first remotely operated pan-and-tilt-head camera, as well as several vehicular mounts, for the film Grand Prix (also 1966). For this latter invention, he received a Technical Achievement Award from the Society of Operating Cameramen in 1994.

== Early life ==
Stephens was born in Valparaiso, Indiana in 1932. He enlisted in the United States Navy during the Korean War, where he first learned how to use a camera in extreme conditions.

== Career ==
Working as a photographer in Sun Valley, Idaho, he entered film work as an assistant cameraman and stills photographer on Bus Stop (1956) and South Pacific (1958).

Stephens met director John Frankenheimer while working as a camera operator on the film Seconds. He and director of photography James Wong Howe helped develop an early camera body mount, better known as a Snorricam, for the film. Frankenheimer hired Stephens as the second unit cameraman for his next film, the Formula One racing drama Grand Prix, determined to capture the F1 cars driving at 160mph (300km/h). Stephens developed a mechanism that allowed a Super Panavision 70 cameras to be mounted to a F1 racer and be remotely controlled from a helicopter or camera car. The system had to overcome several factors - including the weight of the camera, the speed of the vehicle (on average 260 km/h), and the high head winds and G forces which caused mechanical problems in the cameras. Stephen's innovations earned him a Technical Achievement Award from the Society of Operating Cameramen in 1994. He was also one of the first cinematographers to use Nelson Tyler's aerial gyro-stabilized camera system, which would become the norm for aerial cinematography.

As a cinematographer, Stephens was known for his work on such films as Billy Jack, Blacula, Martin Scorsese's Boxcar Bertha, and William Friedkin's Sorcerer. He also shot the memorable bicycle chase for Steven Spielberg's E.T. the Extra-Terrestrial, though he did not receive on-screen credit for his work. He was also the second unit director and cameraman for John Landis' comedy Three Amigos and the aerial photographer for Phil Alden Robinson's acclaimed Field of Dreams.

From the late 1980s onward, he more prominently worked as a second unit and aerial unit director of photography, most notably on Martin Brest's Midnight Run and James Cameron's Titanic. He survived three different helicopter crashes over the course of his career.

Oscar-nominated cinematographer Don Burgess cited him as an early mentor.

== Death ==
Aged 82, Stephens died in Orange County, California on June 18, 2015.

== Partial filmography ==
=== As camera operator ===
- Bus Stop (1956) - 2nd assistant cameraman (uncredited)
- South Pacific (1958) - 2nd assistant cameraman (uncredited)
- Ski Party (1965)- camera operator - (uncredited)
- The Hallelujah Trail (1965) - second unit (uncredited)
- Seconds (1966)
- Grand Prix (1966)
- Ice Station Zebra (1968) - additional arctic photography
- Snowball Express (1972) - second unit
- The Fog (1980) - additional camera (uncredited)
- E.T. the Extra-Terrestrial (1982) - (uncredited)
- Indiana Jones and the Temple of Doom (1984) - California unit
- Three Amigos (1986) - second unit; also second unit director
- Field of Dreams (1989) - aerial photographer

=== As cinematographer ===
- Run, Angel, Run (1969)
- Billy Jack (1971)
- Bunny O'Hare (1971)
- Boxcar Bertha (1972)
- Blacula (1972)
- Sorcerer (1977)
- Ski Patrol (1990)

=== As second unit director of photography ===
- The Other Side of the Mountain (1975)
- Midnight Run (1988)
- Loose Cannons (1990)
- Major League II (1994)
- Conspiracy Theory (1997)
- Titanic (1997)
- Six Days Seven Nights (1998)
- Bandits (2001)
