= The Wages of Fear (novel) =

French novel by Georges Arnaud

- Hardcover edition 1950
- Author: Georges Arnaud
- Original title: Le Salaire de la peur
- Translator: Norman Dale
- Language: French
- Genre: Thriller
- Publisher: Éditions Julliard
- Publication date: 1950
- Publication place: France
- Media type: Print
- Pages: 203 pp.
- ISBN: 9782260018117
- OCLC: (OCoLC)2926544
- Dewey Decimal: 843.91

The Wages of Fear (Le Salaire de la peur, 1950), by Georges Arnaud, is a psychological thriller novel about desperate men in desperate circumstances and the actions each man takes to escape his desperation. First published in France by Éditions Julliard, Le Salaire de la peur (1950); two years later, the novel was translated to English, by Norman Dale, as The Wages of Fear (1952) and was published by The Bodley Head company in the U.K.; likewise, the first American edition of Le Salaire de peur was published by Farrar, Straus and Young.

== Synopsis ==
The Wages of Fear (1950) is the story of four desperate men stranded in a geographically remote town in Guatemala, and are tasked with transporting a dangerous cargo of unstable nitroglycerin over perilous roads.

== Film adaptations ==
Since 1953, the novel has been cinematized several times:

- 1953: The Wages of Fear by Henri-Georges Clouzot
- 1960: Violent Road by Howard W. Koch
- 1976: South Fire by Alain Brune
- 1977: Sorcerer by William Friedkin
- 1988: Thaman Al-Khouf; Egyptian TV series loosely based on the novel. https://elcinema.com/work/1124245/
- 2024: The Wages of Fear by Julien Leclercq
