= William Friedkin's unrealized projects =

During his long career, American film director William Friedkin had worked on a number of projects which never progressed beyond the pre-production stage under his direction. Some of these productions fell in development hell or were cancelled.

== 1970s ==
=== The Devil's Triangle ===
Following the success of The Exorcist (1973), Friedkin developed a UFO-related film project titled The Devil's Triangle. The film was to have starred Marlon Brando, Charlton Heston and Steve McQueen and be set in the Bermuda Triangle. The project was delayed by the lengthy filming of Sorcerer (1977) and Friedkin dropped the idea after Steven Spielberg started making Close Encounters of the Third Kind (1977).

=== A Safe Darkness ===
In 1974, Friedkin filmed an incomplete documentary titled A Safe Darkness, which was to have been about the history of horror cinema. There, he filmed interviews with Roman Polanski and Fritz Lang.

=== The Spirit ===
In 1976, Friedkin had obtained the film rights to The Spirit and contacted Will Eisner to write a script for him. Eisner declined but recommended Harlan Ellison, who wrote a two-hour live-action script for the filmmaker. Friedkin and Ellison afterward had an unrelated argument, and the project was abandoned. Friedkin called the character of The Spirit "a sort of modern-day Don Quixote, a vulnerable hero who doesn't always succeed. His Sancho Panza is a 12-year-old black boy named Ebony." He also added "The Spirit will not be another Batman." He was expected to work on it as his next project after Sorcerer.

=== Blood and Money ===
In 1978, Friedkin attempted to make a film adaptation of Thomas Thompson's book Blood and Money, which is based on the murders of Joan Robinson Hill and her husband John Hill. Friedkin abandoned that project in favor of directing Cruising (1980).

=== Desperadoes ===
In 1979, it was reported that Friedkin was to have directed and produced a film adaptation of Ron Hansen's novel Desperadoes after he completed the post-production of Cruising.

== 1980s ==
=== Brain ===
In 1981, it was reported that Friedkin was to have directed a film adaptation of Robin Cook's novel Brain.

=== That Championship Season ===
Jason Miller, who worked with Friedkin in The Exorcist, tapped him to direct a film adaptation of his Pulitzer Prize winning play That Championship Season. Friedkin offered the role of Coach Delaney to William Holden, but Holden died before he could accept. Friedkin then left the project, after which Miller directed the film with Robert Mitchum as Delaney.

=== The Executioner ===
In 1985, it was reported that Friedkin was to have directed Sylvester Stallone in a film adaptation of Don Pendleton's book series The Executioner.

=== The Gambler ===
In 1988, Friedkin attempted to direct Stallone in a film titled The Gambler, with the screenplay written by Edward Neumeier.

=== Leiber and Stoller biopic ===
In 1989, it was reported that Friedkin was to direct a biopic on Jerry Leiber and Mike Stoller, with Leiber and Friedkin writing the screenplay.

== 1990s ==
=== Desperate Hours ===
Friedkin and Christopher Cain were each attached to direct the film Desperate Hours (1990) prior to Michael Cimino's involvement. Friedkin instead chose to direct The Guardian (1990).

=== Elsewhere ===
In 1993, it was reported that after the completion of his 1994 film Blue Chips, Friedkin was to direct a film titled Elsewhere, with the screenplay written by William Peter Blatty.

=== The Diary of Jack the Ripper ===
In 1994, it was reported that Friedkin was set to direct a film titled The Diary of Jack the Ripper for New Line Cinema. Anthony Hopkins signed on to star as James Maybrick, who was accused of being Jack the Ripper. The screenplay by Christopher De Vore was to have been based on Maybrick's diaries. Friedkin wanted to incorporate the usage of computer-generated imagery in order to faithfully re-create the London 1888 setting, and was allegedly looking at the various special effects houses that had "cutting-edge" CGI credits. However, by 1997, it was then reported that Friedkin filed a lawsuit against New Line and Katja Motion Picture Corp. for blocking further development on the film. The following year, the Los Angeles Times reported that Friedkin wrote the film himself and was now directing with European financing. When asked what project he would most like to do in 2012, Friedkin answered, "I would love to do my version of the Jack the Ripper story. That's a film that I still have in me and the rights that I had to this one particular account, which I find believable, are really entangled. They were from the beginning. That's the only story that I really have a feeling for."

=== Bag Men ===
It was reported in 1997 that Friedkin used his own money to option the film rights to John Flood's novel Bag Men. Michael Keaton was in talks to star in the project.

=== Battle Grease ===
In 1998, Friedkin attempted to make a film titled Battle Grease, which would have been about James and Florence Maybrick but from Florence's perspective.

=== Truth or Dare ===
Also in 1998, it was reported that Friedkin was attached to direct Truth or Dare for Regency Enterprises. The project, with the screenplay written by William Davies, was said to have been a remake of a 1996 BBC television film of the same name.

=== Night Train ===
Also in 1998, Friedkin was attached to direct a biopic about Sonny Liston for Paramount Pictures, with Ving Rhames portraying the boxer. The film was to have been titled Night Train.

== 2000s ==
=== O Jerusalem! ===
In 2000, it was reported that Friedkin was in talks to direct a film adaptation of Larry Collins and Dominique Lapierre's book O Jerusalem!, with James Dearden serving as screenwriter.

=== Shooter ===
Also in 2000, it was reported that Friedkin was to direct Tommy Lee Jones in Shooter, which is based on Stephen Hunter's novel Point of Impact. A film adaptation, using the title Shooter, was made and released in 2007, but with Mark Wahlberg starring and Antoine Fuqua directing.

=== The Book of Skulls ===
In 2003, it was reported that Paramount Pictures tapped Friedkin to direct a film adaptation of Robert Silverberg's novel The Book of Skulls.

=== Coco & Igor ===
In 2007, it was reported that Friedkin was involved in making a film adaptation of Chris Greenhalgh's novel Coco and Igor.

== 2010s ==
=== Dimiter ===
William Peter Blatty reported in 2010 that Friedkin was "eager" to direct a film adaptation of his novel Dimiter.

=== Trapped ===
In 2012, it was reported that Friedkin was to have directed Demián Bichir in an unmade film titled Trapped.

=== I Am Wrath ===
Also in 2012, it was announced that Friedkin would direct Nicolas Cage in I Am Wrath. The film was released in 2016, with John Travolta and Chuck Russell taking Cage and Friedkin's places respectively.

=== The Winter of Frankie Machine ===
In August 2015, it was announced that Friedkin would direct a film adaptation of Don Winslow's 2006 novel The Winter of Frankie Machine, with Friedkin reportedly looking to make the project on a low budget of "under $15 million".
