= List of thriller films before 1940 =

A list of thriller films released in the before 1940.

Title	Director	Cast	Country	Subgenre/notes
1926
The Bat	Roland West	Tullio Carminatti, Charles Herzinger, Jewel Carmen, Louise Fazenda	United States	
The Bells	James Young	Gustav von Seyffertitz, E. Alyn Warren	United States	
The Lodger	Alfred Hitchcock	Ivor Novello	United Kingdom	
1928
Spies	Fritz Lang	Rudolf Klein-Rogge, Gerda Maurus, Lien Deyers, Craighall Sherry	Germany	
1929
Blackmail	Alfred Hitchcock	Anny Ondra, Sara Allgood, Charles Paton	United Kingdom	
1930
The Bat Whispers	Roland West	Spencer Charters, Chester Morris, Una Merkel	United States	
1931
Charlie Chan Carries On	Hamilton MacFadden	Warner Oland, John Garrick, Marguerite Churchill	United States	Crime thriller
M	Fritz Lang	Peter Lorre, Ellen Widmann, Inge Landgut, Gustaf Gründgens	Germany	
1932
Freaks	Tod Browning	Wallace Ford, Leila Hyams, Olga Baclanova	United States	
The Most Dangerous Game	Irving Pichel, Ernest B. Schoedsack	Joel McCrea, Fay Wray, Leslie Banks	United States	
Number 17	Alfred Hitchcock	Leon M. Lion, Anne Grey, Donald Calthrop	United Kingdom	
Rome Express	Walter Forde	Conrad Veidt, Esther Ralston, Joan Barry	United Kingdom	
Tangled Destinies	Frank Strayer	Lloyd Whitlock, Doris Hill, Glenn Tryon	United States	
Thirteen Women	George Archainbaud	Irene Dunne, Myrna Loy, Ricardo Cortez	United States	
1933
Charlie Chan's Greatest Case	Hamilton MacFadden	Warner Oland, Heather Angel, Roger Imhof	United States	Crime thriller
1934
Charlie Chan in London	Eugene J. Forde	Warner Oland, Drue Leyton, Douglas Walton	United States	Crime thriller
The Man Who Knew Too Much	Alfred Hitchcock	Leslie Banks, Edna Best, Peter Lorre	United Kingdom	
The Thin Man	W.S. Van Dyke	William Powell, Myrna Loy	United States	
1935
The 39 Steps	Alfred Hitchcock	Robert Donat, Madeleine Carroll	United Kingdom	
Mad Love	Karl W. Freund	Peter Lorre, Frances Drake, Colin Clive	United States	
1936
After the Thin Man	W.S. Van Dyke	William Powell, Myrna Loy	United States	Comedy thriller
Black Gold	Russell Hopton	Frankie Darro, LeRoy Mason, Gloria Shea	United States	Crime thriller
The Invisible Ray	Lambert Hillyer	Bela Lugosi, Frances Drake, Frank Lawton	United States	
Sabotage	Alfred Hitchcock	Sylvia Sidney, Oscar Homolka, Desmond Tester	United Kingdom	
1937
L'alibi	Pierre Chenal	Louis Jouvet, Erich von Stroheim, Albert Préjean	France	
Love From a Stranger	Rowland V. Lee	Ann Harding, Basil Rathbone, Binnie Hale	United Kingdom	
Night Must Fall	Richard Thorpe	Robert Montgomery, Rosalind Russell	United States	
Young and Innocent	Alfred Hitchcock	Nova Pilbeam, Derrick de Marney, Percy Marmont	United Kingdom	
1938
They Drive by Night	Arthur B. Woods	Emlyn Williams, Ernest Thesiger, Anna Konstam	United Kingdom	
The Lady Vanishes	Alfred Hitchcock	Margaret Lockwood, Michael Redgrave, Paul Lukas	United Kingdom	
1939
Another Thin Man	W.S. Van Dyke	William Powell, Myrna Loy	United States	
Clouds over Europe	Tim Whelan, Sr.	Laurence Olivier, Ralph Richardson, Valerie Hobson	United Kingdom	
Exile Express	Otis M. Garrett	Anna Sten, Alan Marshal, Jerome Cowan	United States	
The Human Monster	Walter Summers	Bela Lugosi, Hugh Williams, Great Gynt	United Kingdom	
Jamaica Inn	Alfred Hitchcock	Charles Laughton, Maureen O'Hara	United Kingdom	
