= Les Espions =

1957 French film

- Directed by: Henri-Georges Clouzot
- Written by: Henri-Georges Clouzot; Jerome Geronimi (adaptation dialogue)
- Based on: d'après le roman de Egon Hostovsky "Le Vertige de minuit"
- Produced by: Georges Lourau; Henri-Georges Clouzot
- Starring: Curd Jürgens; Peter Ustinov; O. E. Hasse; Sam Jaffe; Paul Carpenter; Véra Clouzot; Martita Hunt; Gerard Sety
- Cinematography: Christian Matras
- Edited by: Madeleine Gug
- Music by: Georges Auric
- Production companies: Filmsonor; Vera Films; Pretoria Film
- Distributed by: Cinédis
- Release date: 11 October 1957 (Paris)
- Running time: 126 minutes
- Countries: France; Italy

Les Espions ("The Spies") is a 1957 French-Italian noir mystery film directed by Henri-Georges Clouzot and starring Curd Jürgens, Peter Ustinov O. E. Hasse, Sam Jaffe, Paul Carpenter, Véra Clouzot, Martita Hunt and Gérard Séty. The music was composed by Georges Auric.

It was shot at the Saint-Maurice in Paris. The film's sets were designed by the art director René Renoux.

== Plot ==
The plot concerns a doctor at a rundown psychiatric hospital who is offered a million francs to shelter a new patient. Soon, the place is full of suspicious and secretive characters, all apparently international secret agents trying to find out who and what the patient is.

== Cast ==
- Curd Jürgens as Alex
- Peter Ustinov as Michel Kaminsky
- O. E. Hasse as Hugo Vogel
- Sam Jaffe as Sam Cooper
- Paul Carpenter as Le Colonel Howard
- Véra Clouzot as Lucie
- Martita Hunt as Connie Harper
- Gérard Séty as Le docteur Malic
- Gabrielle Dorziat as Madame Andrée - I'infirmière
- Louis Seigner as Valette - le morphinomane
- Pierre Larquey as Le chauffeur de taxi
- Georgette Anys as La buraliste
- Jean Brochard as Le surveillant-général
- Bernard Lajarrige as Le garçon de café
- Dominique Davray as L'Alsacienne
- Daniel Emilfork as Helmut Petersen - un espion
- Jean-Jacques Lécot as Le faux contrôleur (as Jean-Jacques Lecot)
- Robert Lombard as Le contrôleur
- Patrick Dewaere as Le petit Moinet (as Patrick Maurin)
- Clément Harari as Victor - le faux garçon de café
- Sacha Pitoëff as Léon (as Sacha Pitoeff)
- Fernand Sardou as Pierre
