= Gérard Séty =

French actor

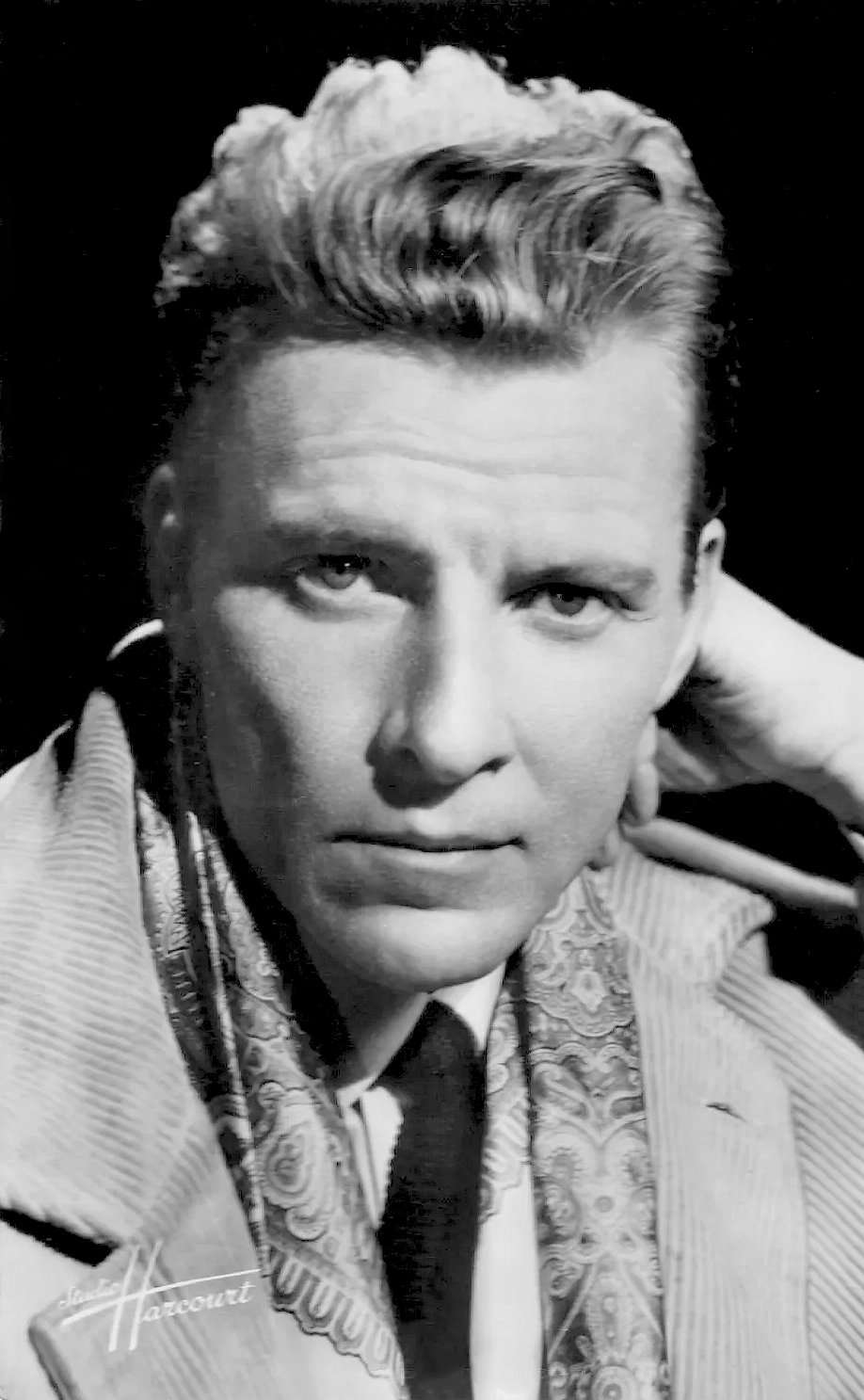
Image of Gerard Sety

Gérard Séty (French pronunciation: [ʒeʁaʁ seti]; 13 December 1922 – 1 February 1998) was a French actor.

== Partial filmography ==
- The Temptation of Barbizon (1946) - Le chauffeur (uncredited)
- Night Warning (1946) - Un pilote américain (uncredited)
- Patrie (1946)
- Les aventures des Pieds-Nickelés (1948)
- Mission in Tangier (1949) - Un client du cabaret
- Death Threat (1950) - Jean
- Le trésor des Pieds-Nickelés (1950) - Le capitaine
- Nuits de Paris (1951)
- The Porter from Maxim's (1953) - Le chambellan
- Act of Love (1953) - (uncredited)
- The Red and the Black (1954) - Le lieutenant Liéven
- Pas de souris dans le business (1955) - Maurice Trupeau
- Lady Chatterley's Lover (1955) - Michaelis
- Meeting in Paris (1956) - Le sculpteur
- Miss Catastrophe (1957) - Mathias - l'escroc
- Les Espions (1957) - Le docteur Malic
- Maigret Sets a Trap (1958) - Georges "Jojo" Vacher
- Montparnasse 19 (1958) - Léopold Zborowsky
- Le travail c'est la liberté (1959) - Eugène Boullu
- Les Pique-assiette (1960) - Santiago
- My Son, the Hero (1962) - Aquiles
- Seul... à corps perdu (1963) - Marc Forestier
- Cadavres en vacances (1963) - Bernard
- A Taste for Women (1964) - Léon Palmer
- The War Is Over (1966) - Bill
- Catherine, il suffit d'un amour (1969) - Legoix
- Il faut vivre dangereusement (1975) - Courtade
- L'argent des autres (1978) - De Nully
- Les filles du régiment (1978) - Bobby, le général
- The Dogs (1979) - Le maire
- La puce et le privé (1981) - Rossi
- Van Gogh (1991) - Gachet
- Les Visiteurs (1993) - Edgar Bernay
- Fanfan (1993) - Ti
- Délit mineur (1994) - Claude's Father
