= Véra Clouzot =

Brazilian-French actress

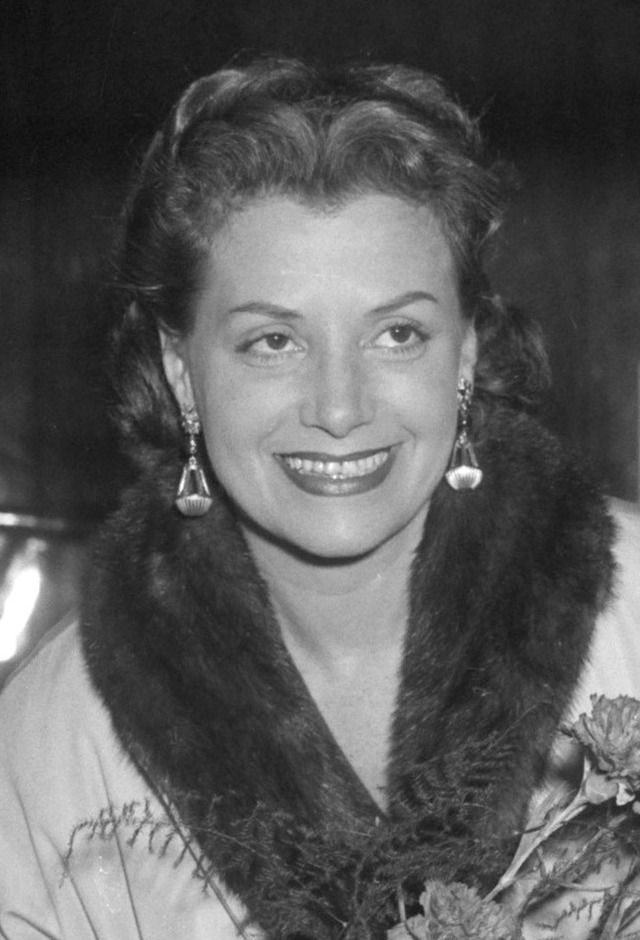
- Clouzot in 1953
- Born: Véra Gibson-Amado; 30 December 1913; Rio de Janeiro, Brazil
- Died: 15 December 1960 (aged 46); Paris, France
- Years active: 1953–1957
- Spouse(s): Léo Lapara (m. 1941; div. 1947) Henri-Georges Clouzot (m. 1950)
- Family: Jorge Amado (second cousin)

Véra Gibson-Amado, known professionally as Véra Clouzot, (30 December 1913 – 15 December 1960) was a Brazilian-French film actress and screenwriter. She is known for playing Linda in The Wages of Fear (1953), Christina Delassalle in Les Diaboliques (1955), and Lucie in Les Espions (1957). Clouzot also co-wrote the screenplay for La Vérité (1960). Her husband, director Henri-Georges Clouzot, named his production company after her, Véra Films.

== Early life ==
Clouzot was born Véra Gibson-Amado in Rio de Janeiro, Brazil, to Alice do Rego Barros and Gilberto Amado, a Brazilian congressman, writer, journalist, lawyer and ex-President of the United Nations' International Law Committee. Writer Jorge Amado was her second cousin.

In 1941, Véra met French actor Léo Lapara, a member of the theater company of Louis Jouvet who toured in Brazil during World War II. Vera married the actor, taking part in the company's South American tour that lasted almost four years.

== Career in France ==
After World War II, Vera settled in Paris. Louis Jouvet took over the direction of the Athenée Theater, while she continued to do small roles.

Véra met film director Henri-Georges Clouzot through her then-husband, Léo Lapara, who had minor parts in Quai des Orfèvres (1947) and Return to Life (1949), in the segment directed by Clouzot, "Le Retour de Jean".

Véra worked as a continuity assistant on Clouzot's Miquette (1950), and they married in 1950. Clouzot named his production company, Véra Films, after his wife. She made only three films, all directed by her husband. The sole female role in The Wages of Fear (1953), Linda, is played by Véra. Clouzot wrote the role specifically for his wife, as the character does not exist in the original novel. The Wages of Fear is about a South American town where a group of desperate men are offered money to drive trucks carrying nitroglycerin through rough terrain to put out an oil well fire. The Wages of Fear was the 4th highest-grossing film in France in 1953, and was seen by nearly 7 million spectators.

The most notable of Clouzot's films starring Véra was the classic thriller Les Diaboliques (1955), co-starring Simone Signoret. She also starred in Les Espions (1957), and co-wrote the screenplay for the film La Vérité (1960), which was also directed by her husband.

Clouzot and Véra took a film crew with them to Véra's homeland in Brazil for their honeymoon, where Clouzot made his first attempt at directing a documentary film. The Brazilian government took issue with Clouzot filming the poverty of people in the favelas rather than the more picturesque parts of Brazil. The film was never finished because the costs became too high. Clouzot became fascinated with the region and wrote a book, Le cheval des dieux, recounting his trip.

== Death ==
Véra died in Paris in 1960, aged 46, from a heart attack, shortly after the filming of La Vérité. Henri-Georges Clouzot fell into a depression over her death. After her funeral, he moved to Tahiti but returned to France in December 1961.

== Filmography ==
Year	Title	Role	Notes
1953	The Wages of Fear	Linda	
1955	Les Diaboliques	Christina Delassalle	
1957	Les Espions	Lucie	(final film role)

== Sources ==
- Bocquet, José-Louis; Godin, Marc (1993). Henri-Georges Clouzot Cinéaste. La Sirène. ISBN 9782840450153.
- Chandler, Charlotte (2006). It's Only a Movie: Alfred Hitchcock : A Personal Biography. Hal Leonard Corporation. ISBN 1-55783-692-2.
- Hayward, Susan (2005). Les diaboliques. University of Illinois Press.
- Lanzoni, Rémi Fournier (2004). French Cinema: From its Beginnings to the Present. Continuum International Publishing Group. ISBN 0-8264-1600-4.
- Lloyd, Christopher (2007). Henri-Georges Clouzot. Manchester University Press. ISBN 978-0-7190-7014-3.
- Mayne, Judith (2007). Le corbeau: French film guides series. I.B. Tauris. ISBN 978-1-84511-370-4.
