= Georges Arnaud =

French author

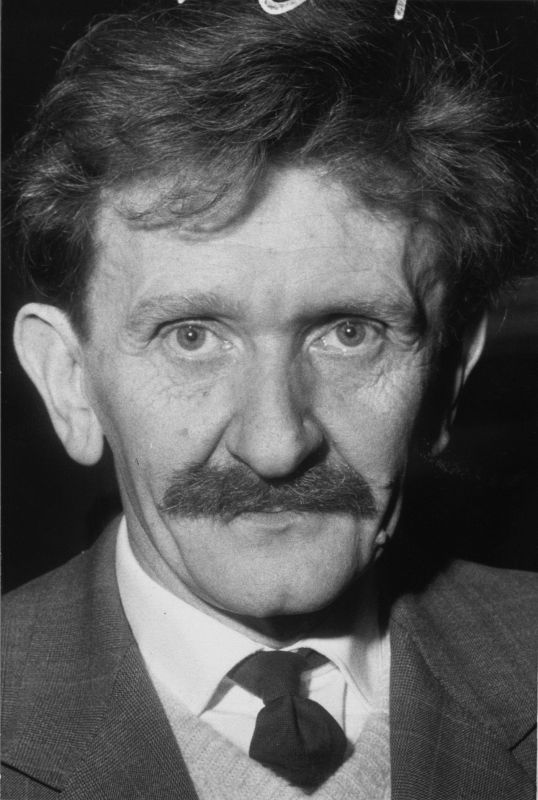
- An image of Henri Girard
- Born: Henri Girald; 16 July 1917; Montpellier, France
- Died: 4 March 1987 (aged 69); Barcelona, Spain
- Occupation: Writer

Henri Girard (16 July 1917 – 4 March 1987) was a French author who used the pseudonym Georges Arnaud. He was born in Montpellier. He was the author of the novel The Wages of Fear (French: Le Salaire de la peur).

== Biography ==
Georges Arnaud was a writer, investigative journalist and political activist.

After obtaining his baccalauréat, he studied language and literature. He then moved to Paris and gained a law degree in 1938.

On the night of 24 to 25 October 1941, Henri's father (a deputy archivist at the Ministry of Foreign Affairs of Vichy France), aunt and a servant were murdered in the family castle. Henri Girard, the only survivor, raised the alarm the following morning to the castle staff. In the mysterious circumstances of the murder, Henri was arrested, charged and imprisoned. He spent nineteen months in prison where, because of the war, he was neglected and left to starve and freeze. His trial began on 27 May 1943; the jury acquitted him on 2 June.

Thereafter, he resided in Paris from 1943 to 1947, where he married a young singer, Suzanne Graux, for whom he wrote songs and with whom he had two sons. Some of his songs were performed by Edith Piaf, (such as Les Hiboux).

Disgusted by the power of man's fascination with money, he quickly spent the family inheritance, donating to a number of good causes. In debt and wanting to be forgotten (especially by his creditors), he left for South America on 2 May 1947.

Back in France in 1950, he published his first novel The Wages of Fear, inspired by his journey. Then came new works from his experiences: The Journey of the Wicked Thief and Schtibilem 41 (on his stay in prison). He also reported for various newspapers. In 1952, the filmmaker Henri-Georges Clouzot made a film adaptation of The Wages of Fear with Yves Montand and Charles Vanel.

In 1953, Henri Girard met his new companion, Rolande. They married in 1966 and had two daughters together. Also in 1953, his play Avowales the Sweetest created a scandal. The play was adapted for television by Édouard Molinaro in 1970. In 1962, Girard moved to Algeria with his family, where he helped establish a journalism school and launched a newspaper, Révolution Africaine. He left Algeria in 1974.

Between 1975 and 1981, he was a reporter on French television. In 1984, he settled with his wife in Barcelona where he died of a heart attack on 4 March 1987.

== Relatives ==
Henri Girard had two sons by the names of Dominique (1946) and Henri (1947) and two daughters, Catherine (1962) and Laurence (1964).

== Bibliography ==
- Le Salaire de la peur, Julliard, 1950.
- Le Voyage du mauvais larron, Julliard, 1951; Le Pré aux Clercs, 1987
- Lumière de soufre, Julliard, 1952.
- Indiens des hauts plateaux, revue 9, n°8, décembre 1952.
- Prisons 53, Julliard 1953.
- Schtibilem 1941, Julliard, 1953.
- Les Oreilles sur le dos, Editions du Scorpion, 1953; Julliard, 1974
- Les Aveux les plus doux, Julliard, 1954.
- Les Aveux les plus doux (scénario), Editions des Lettres françaises, 1954.
- Indiens pas morts, Delpire Editeur, 1956.
- Pour Djamila Bouhired, Editions de Minuit, 1957.
- Maréchal P..., Editeurs Français Réunis, 1958.
- La Plus Grande Pente, Julliard, 1961.
- Mon procès, Editions de Minuit, 1961.
- Préface within The Murder of Roger Ackroyd of Agatha Christie, Le Livre de Poche, 1961.
- L'Affaire Peiper : plus qu'un fait divers, Atelier Marcel Jullian, 1978.
- Chroniques du crime et de l'innocence, Jean-Claude Lattès, 1982.
- Juste avant l'aube, in collaboration with Jean Anglade, Presses de la Cité, 1990.
