= Film noir =

Crime films with cynical atmosphere

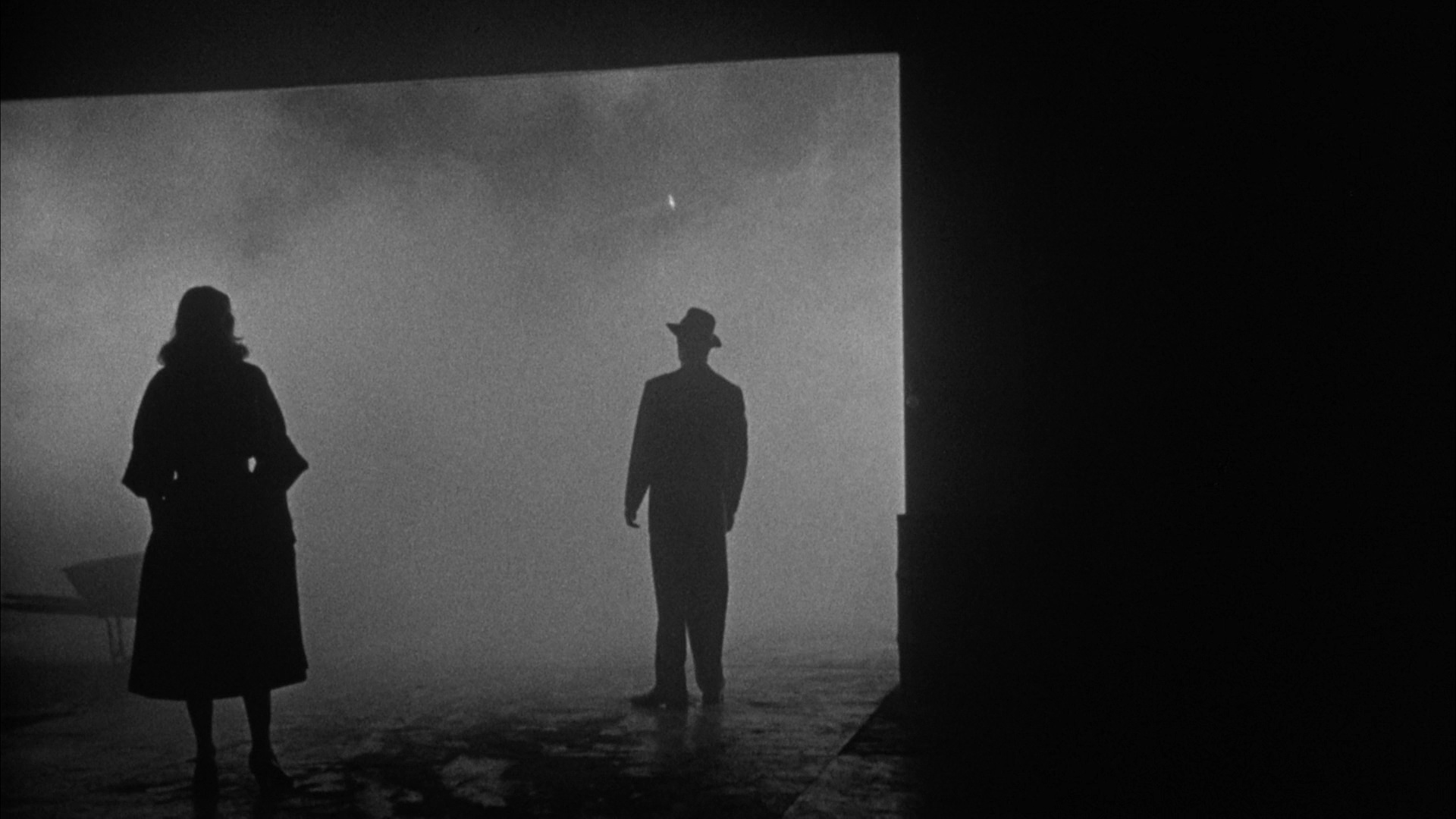
- Two silhouetted figures in The Big Combo (1955). The film's cinematographer, John Alton, is sometimes credited as the creator of many of film noir's stylized images.
- Years active: Classic period: 1940s and 1950s; earlier films are often referred to as proto-noirs and later films as neo-noirs
- Location: United States
- Major figures: Humphrey Bogart; Robert Mitchum; Peter Lorre; Robert Ryan
- Influences: German expressionism; French poetic realism; Italian neorealism; American hardboiled fiction
- Influenced: French New Wave; Neo-noir; Tech noir

A film noir (/nwɑːr/; French: [film nwaʁ]) is a Hollywood crime drama film that emphasizes cynical attitudes and motivations. The 1940s and 1950s are generally regarded as the "classic period" of American film noir. Film noir of this era is associated with a low-key, black-and-white visual style that has roots in German expressionist cinematography. Many of the prototypical stories and attitudes expressed in classic noir derive from the hardboiled school of crime fiction that emerged in the United States during the Great Depression, known as noir fiction. Film noir encompasses a range of plots, commonly featuring mysteries/crime dramas, detective fiction, and stories with themes of corruption, organized crime, redemption, cynicism, and tragedy.

Common archetypical protagonists include a private investigator (The Big Sleep), a plainclothes police officer (The Big Heat), an aging boxer (The Set-Up), a hapless grifter (Night and the City), a law-abiding citizen lured into a life of crime (Gun Crazy), a femme fatale (Gilda) or simply a victim of circumstance (D.O.A.).

The term film noir, French for "black film" (literal) or "dark film" (closer meaning), was first applied to Hollywood films by French critic Nino Frank in 1946, but was unrecognized by most American film industry professionals of that era. Frank is believed to have been inspired by the French literary publishing imprint Série noire, founded in 1945.

Cinema historians and critics defined the category retrospectively. Before the notion was widely adopted in the 1970s, many of the classic film noirs^{[a]} were referred to as "melodramas". Whether film noir qualifies as a distinct genre or whether it should be considered a filmmaking style continues to be debated by film scholars.

Although film noir was originally associated with American productions, the term has been used to describe films from around the world. Many films released from the 1960s onward share attributes with film noirs of the classical period, and often treat its conventions self-referentially. Latter-day works are typically referred to as neo-noir. The clichés of film noir have inspired parody since the mid-1940s.

== Definition ==
The Stranger (1946), directed by Orson Welles

The question of what defines film noir and what sort of category it is, provokes continuing debate. "We'd be oversimplifying things in calling film noir oneiric, strange, erotic, ambivalent, and cruel ..."—this set of attributes constitutes the first of many attempts to define film noir made by French critics Raymond Borde and Étienne Chaumeton in their 1955 book Panorama du film noir américain 1941–1953 (A Panorama of American Film Noir), the original and seminal extended treatment of the subject. They emphasize that not every noir film embodies all five attributes in equal measure—one might be more dreamlike; another, particularly brutal. The authors' caveats and repeated efforts at alternative definition have been echoed in subsequent scholarship, but in the words of cinema historian Mark Bould, film noir remains an "elusive phenomenon."

Though film noir is often identified with a visual style that emphasizes low-key lighting and unbalanced compositions, films commonly identified as noir evidence a variety of visual approaches, including ones that fit comfortably within the Hollywood mainstream. Film noir similarly embraces a variety of genres, from the gangster film to the police procedural to the gothic romance to the social problem picture—any example of which from the 1940s and 1950s, now seen as noir's classical era, was likely to be described as a melodrama at the time.

It is night, always. The hero enters a labyrinth on a quest. He is alone and off balance. He may be desperate, in flight, or coldly calculating, imagining he is the pursuer rather than the pursued.

A woman invariably joins him at a critical juncture, when he is most vulnerable. [Her] eventual betrayal of him (or herself) is as ambiguous as her feelings about him.

— Nicholas Christopher, Somewhere in the Night (1997)

While many critics refer to film noir as a genre itself, others argue that it can be no such thing. Foster Hirsch defines a genre as determined by "conventions of narrative structure, characterization, theme, and visual design." Hirsch, as one who has taken the position that film noir is a genre, argues that these elements are present "in abundance." Hirsch notes that there are unifying features of tone, visual style and narrative sufficient to classify noir as a distinct genre.

Others argue that film noir is not a genre. It is often associated with an urban setting, but many classic noirs take place in small towns, suburbia, rural areas, or on the open road; setting is not a determinant, as with the Western. Similarly, while the private eye and the femme fatale are stock character types conventionally identified with noir, the majority of films in the genre feature neither. Nor does film noir rely on anything as evident as the monstrous or supernatural elements of the horror film, the speculative leaps of the science fiction film, or the song-and-dance routines of the musical.

An analogous case is that of the screwball comedy, widely accepted by film historians as constituting a "genre": screwball is defined not by a fundamental attribute, but by a general disposition and a group of elements, some—but rarely and perhaps never all—of which are found in each of the genre's films. Because of the diversity of noir (much greater than that of the screwball comedy), certain scholars in the field, such as film historian Thomas Schatz, treat it as not a genre but a "style". Alain Silver, the most widely published American critic specializing in film noir studies, refers to film noir as a "cycle" and a "phenomenon", even as he argues that it has—like certain genres—a consistent set of visual and thematic codes. Screenwriter Eric R. Williams labels both film noir and screwball comedy a "pathway" in his screenwriters taxonomy; explaining that a pathway has two parts: 1) the way the audience connects with the protagonist and 2) the trajectory the audience expects the story to follow. Other critics treat film noir as a "mood," a "series", or simply a chosen set of films they regard as belonging to the noir "canon." There is no consensus on the matter.

== Background ==
=== Cinematic sources ===
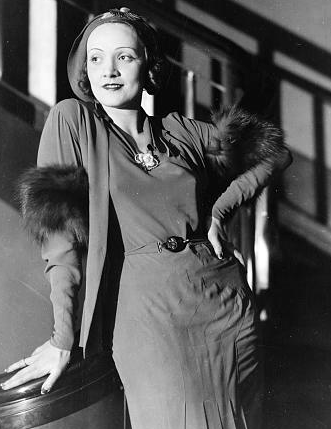
Marlene Dietrich, an actress frequently called upon to play a femme fatale.

The aesthetics of film noir were influenced by German Expressionism, an artistic movement of the 1910s and 1920s that involved theater, music, photography, painting, sculpture and architecture, as well as cinema. The opportunities offered by the booming Hollywood film industry and then the threat of Nazism led to the emigration of many film artists working in Germany who had been involved in the Expressionist movement or studied with its practitioners. M (1931), shot only a few years before director Fritz Lang's departure from Germany, is among the first crime films of the sound era to join a characteristically noirish visual style with a noir-type plot, in which the protagonist is a criminal (as are his most successful pursuers). Directors such as Lang, Jacques Tourneur, Robert Siodmak and Michael Curtiz brought a dramatically shadowed lighting style and a psychologically expressive approach to visual composition (mise-en-scène) with them to Hollywood, where they made some of the most famous classic noirs.

By 1931, Curtiz had already been in Hollywood for half a decade, making as many as six films a year. Movies of his such as 20,000 Years in Sing Sing (1932) and Private Detective 62 (1933) are among the early Hollywood sound films arguably classifiable as noir—scholar Marc Vernet offers the latter as evidence that dating the initiation of film noir to 1940 or any other year is "arbitrary". Expressionism-orientated filmmakers had free stylistic rein in Universal horror pictures such as Dracula (1931), The Mummy (1932)—the former photographed and the latter directed by the Berlin-trained Karl Freund—and The Black Cat (1934), directed by Austrian émigré Edgar G. Ulmer. The Universal horror film that comes closest to noir, in story and sensibility, is The Invisible Man (1933), directed by Englishman James Whale and photographed by American Arthur Edeson. Edeson later photographed The Maltese Falcon (1941), widely regarded as the first major film noir of the classic era.

Josef von Sternberg was directing in Hollywood during the same period. Films of his such as Shanghai Express (1932) and The Devil Is a Woman (1935), with their hothouse eroticism and baroque visual style anticipated central elements of classic noir. The commercial and critical success of Sternberg's silent Underworld (1927) was largely responsible for spurring a trend of Hollywood gangster films. Successful films in that genre such as Little Caesar (1931), The Public Enemy (1931) and Scarface (1932) demonstrated that there was an audience for crime dramas with morally reprehensible protagonists. An important, possibly influential, cinematic antecedent to classic noir was 1930s French poetic realism, with its romantic, fatalistic attitude and celebration of doomed heroes. The movement's sensibility is mirrored in the Warner Bros. drama I Am a Fugitive from a Chain Gang (1932), a forerunner of noir. Among films not considered noir, perhaps none had a greater effect on the development of the genre than Citizen Kane (1941), directed by Orson Welles. Its visual intricacy and complex, voiceover narrative structure are echoed in dozens of classic film noirs.

Italian neorealism of the 1940s, with its emphasis on quasi-documentary authenticity, was an acknowledged influence on trends that emerged in American noir. The Lost Weekend (1945), directed by Billy Wilder, another Vienna-born, Berlin-trained American auteur, tells the story of an alcoholic in a manner evocative of neorealism. It also exemplifies the problem of classification: one of the first American films to be described as a film noir, it has largely disappeared from considerations of the field. Director Jules Dassin of The Naked City (1948) pointed to the neorealists as inspiring his use of location photography with non-professional extras. This semidocumentary approach characterized a substantial number of noirs in the late 1940s and early 1950s. Along with neorealism, the style had an American precedent cited by Dassin, in director Henry Hathaway's The House on 92nd Street (1945), which demonstrated the parallel influence of the cinematic newsreel.

=== Literary sources ===
The October 1934 issue of Black Mask featured the first appearance of the detective character whom Raymond Chandler developed into the famous Philip Marlowe.

The primary literary influence on film noir was the hardboiled school of American detective and crime fiction, led in its early years by such writers as Dashiell Hammett (whose first novel, Red Harvest, was published in 1929) and James M. Cain (whose The Postman Always Rings Twice appeared five years later), and popularized in pulp magazines such as Black Mask. The classic film noirs The Maltese Falcon (1941) and The Glass Key (1942) were based on novels by Hammett; Cain's novels provided the basis for Double Indemnity (1944), Mildred Pierce (1945), The Postman Always Rings Twice (1946), and Slightly Scarlet (1956; adapted from Love's Lovely Counterfeit). A decade before the classic era, a story by Hammett was the source for the gangster melodrama City Streets (1931), directed by Rouben Mamoulian and photographed by Lee Garmes, who worked regularly with Sternberg. Released the month before Lang's M, City Streets has a claim to being the first major film noir; both its style and story had many noir characteristics.

Raymond Chandler, who debuted as a novelist with The Big Sleep in 1939, soon became the most famous author of the hardboiled school. Not only were Chandler's novels turned into major noirs—Murder, My Sweet (1944; adapted from Farewell, My Lovely), The Big Sleep (1946), and Lady in the Lake (1947)—he was an important screenwriter in the genre as well, producing the scripts for Double Indemnity, The Blue Dahlia (1946), and Strangers on a Train (1951). Where Chandler, like Hammett, centered most of his novels and stories on the character of the private eye, Cain featured less heroic protagonists and focused more on psychological exposition than on crime solving; the Cain approach has come to be identified with a subset of the hardboiled genre dubbed "noir fiction". For much of the 1940s, one of the most prolific and successful authors of this often downbeat brand of suspense tale was Cornell Woolrich (sometimes under the pseudonym George Hopley or William Irish). No writer's published work provided the basis for more noir films of the classic period than Woolrich's: thirteen in all, including Black Angel (1946), Deadline at Dawn (1946), and Fear in the Night (1947).

Another crucial literary source for film noir was W. R. Burnett, whose first novel to be published was Little Caesar, in 1929. It was turned into a hit for Warner Bros. in 1931; the following year, Burnett was hired to write dialogue for Scarface, while The Beast of the City (1932) was adapted from one of his stories. At least one important reference work identifies the latter as a film noir despite its early date. Burnett's characteristic narrative approach fell somewhere between that of the quintessential hardboiled writers and their noir fiction compatriots—his protagonists were often heroic in their own way, which happened to be that of the gangster. During the classic era, his work, either as author or screenwriter, was the basis for seven films now widely regarded as noir, including three of the most famous: High Sierra (1941), This Gun for Hire (1942), and The Asphalt Jungle (1950).

== Classic period ==
=== Overview ===
The 1940s and 1950s are generally regarded as the classic period of American film noir. While City Streets and other pre-WWII crime melodramas such as Fury (1936) and You Only Live Once (1937), both directed by Fritz Lang, are categorized as full-fledged noir in Alain Silver and Elizabeth Ward's film noir encyclopedia, other critics tend to describe them as "proto-noir" or in similar terms.

The film now most commonly cited as the first true film noir is Stranger on the Third Floor (1940), directed by Latvian-born, Soviet-trained Boris Ingster. Hungarian émigré Peter Lorre—who had starred in Lang's M—was top-billed, although he did not play the primary lead. (He later played secondary roles in several other formative American noirs.) Although modestly budgeted, at the high end of the B movie scale, Stranger on the Third Floor still lost its studio, RKO, US$56,000 (equivalent to $1,286,936 in 2025), almost a third of its total cost. Variety magazine found Ingster's work: "...too studied and when original, lacks the flare [sic] to hold attention. It's a film too arty for average audiences, and too humdrum for others." Stranger on the Third Floor was not recognized as the beginning of a trend, let alone a new genre, for many decades.

Whoever went to the movies with any regularity during 1946 was caught in the midst of Hollywood's profound postwar affection for morbid drama. From January through December deep shadows, clutching hands, exploding revolvers, sadistic villains and heroines tormented with deeply rooted diseases of the mind flashed across the screen in a panting display of psychoneurosis, unsublimated sex and murder most foul.

— Donald Marshman, Life (August 25, 1947)

Most film noirs of the classic period were similarly low- and modestly-budgeted features without major stars—B movies either literally or in spirit. In this production context, writers, directors, cinematographers, and other craftsmen were relatively free from typical big-picture constraints. There was more visual experimentation than in Hollywood filmmaking as a whole: the Expressionism now closely associated with noir and the semi-documentary style that later emerged represent two very different tendencies. Narrative structures sometimes involved convoluted flashbacks uncommon in non-noir commercial productions. In terms of content, enforcement of the Production Code ensured that no film character could literally get away with murder or be seen sharing a bed with anyone but a spouse; within those bounds, however, many films now identified as noir feature plot elements and dialogue that were very risqué for the time.

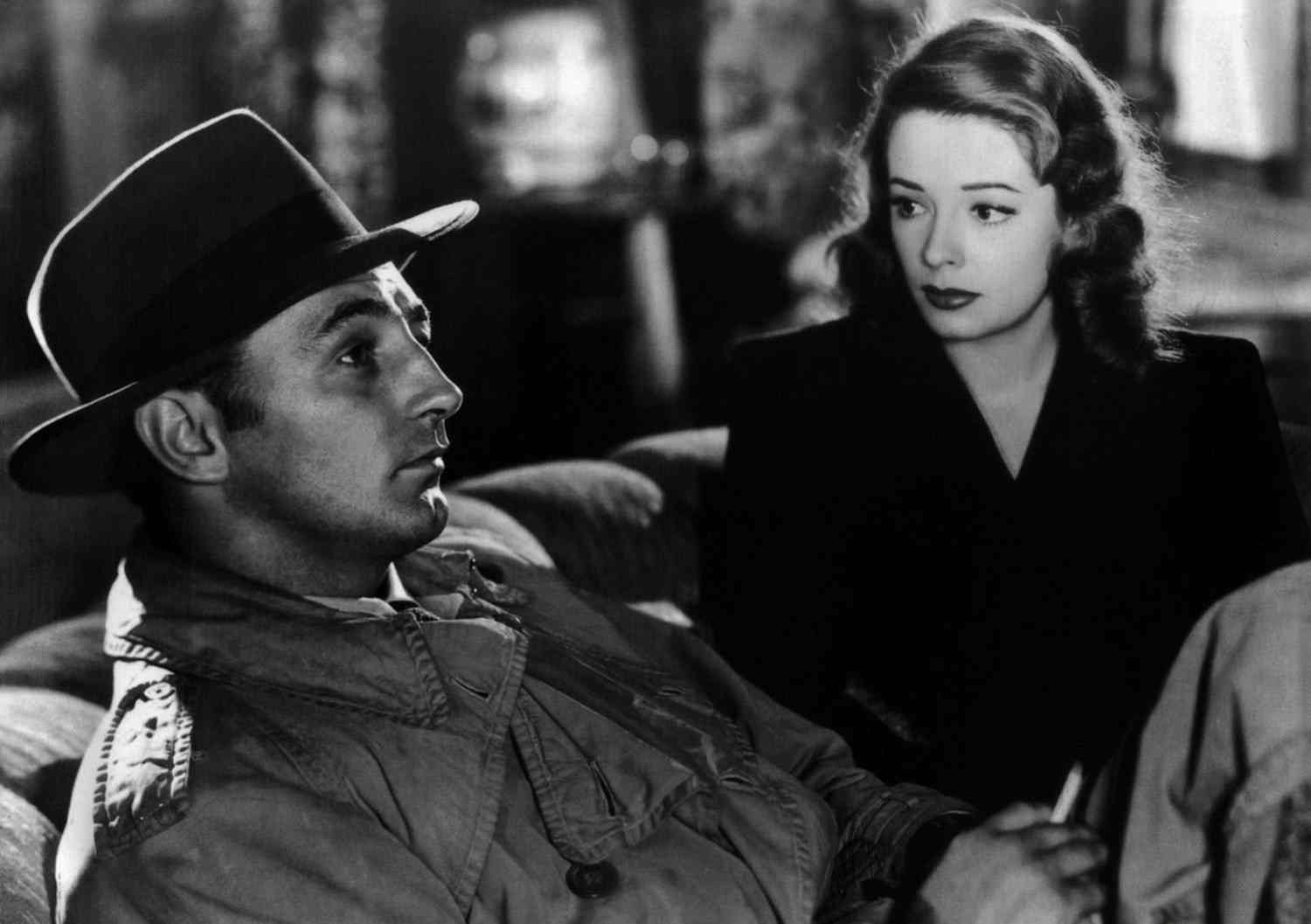
Out of the Past (1947) directed by Jacques Tourneur, features many of the genre's hallmarks: a cynical private detective as the protagonist, a femme fatale, multiple flashbacks with voiceover narration, dramatically shadowed photography, and a fatalistic mood leavened with provocative banter. Pictured are noir icons Robert Mitchum and Jane Greer.

Thematically, film noirs were most exceptional for the relative frequency with which they centered on portrayals of women of questionable virtue—a focus that had become rare in Hollywood films after the mid-1930s and the end of the pre-Code era. The signal film in this vein was Double Indemnity, directed by Billy Wilder; setting the mold was Barbara Stanwyck's femme fatale, Phyllis Dietrichson—an apparent nod to Marlene Dietrich, who had built her extraordinary career playing such characters for Sternberg. An A-level feature, the film's commercial success and seven Oscar nominations made it probably the most influential of the early noirs. A slew of now-renowned noir "bad girls" followed, such as those played by Rita Hayworth in Gilda (1946), Lana Turner in The Postman Always Rings Twice (1946), Ava Gardner in The Killers (1946), and Jane Greer in Out of the Past (1947). The iconic noir counterpart to the femme fatale, the private eye, came to the fore in films such as The Maltese Falcon (1941), with Humphrey Bogart as Sam Spade, and Murder, My Sweet (1944), with Dick Powell as Philip Marlowe.

The prevalence of the private eye as a lead character declined in film noir of the 1950s, a period during which several critics describe the form as becoming more focused on extreme psychologies and more exaggerated in general. A prime example is Kiss Me Deadly (1955); based on a novel by Mickey Spillane, the best-selling of all the hardboiled authors, here the protagonist is a private eye, Mike Hammer. As described by Paul Schrader, "Robert Aldrich's teasing direction carries noir to its sleaziest and most perversely erotic. Hammer overturns the underworld in search of the 'great whatsit' [which] turns out to be—joke of jokes—an exploding atomic bomb." Orson Welles's baroquely styled Touch of Evil (1958) is frequently cited as the last noir of the classic period. Some scholars believe film noir never really ended, but continued to transform even as the characteristic noir visual style began to seem dated and changing production conditions led Hollywood in different directions—in this view, post-1950s films in the noir tradition are seen as part of a continuity with classic noir. A majority of critics, however, regard comparable films made outside the classic era to be something other than genuine film noir. They regard true film noir as belonging to a temporally and geographically limited cycle or period, treating subsequent films that evoke the classics as fundamentally different due to general shifts in filmmaking style and latter-day awareness of noir as a historical source for allusion. These later films are often called neo-noir.

=== Directors and the business of noir ===
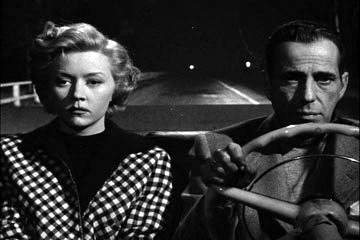
A scene from In a Lonely Place (1950), directed by Nicholas Ray and based on a novel by noir fiction writer Dorothy B. Hughes. Two of noir's defining actors, Gloria Grahame and Humphrey Bogart, portray star-crossed lovers in the film.

While the inceptive noir, Stranger on the Third Floor, was a B picture directed by a virtual unknown, many of the film noirs still remembered were A-list productions by well-known film makers. Debuting as a director with The Maltese Falcon (1941), John Huston followed with Key Largo (1948) and The Asphalt Jungle (1950). Opinion is divided on the noir status of several Alfred Hitchcock thrillers from the era; at least four qualify by consensus: Shadow of a Doubt (1943), Notorious (1946), Strangers on a Train (1951) and The Wrong Man (1956), Otto Preminger's success with Laura (1944) made his name and helped demonstrate noir's adaptability to a high-gloss 20th Century-Fox presentation. Among Hollywood's most celebrated directors of the era, arguably none worked more often in a noir mode than Preminger; his other noirs include Fallen Angel (1945), Whirlpool (1949), Where the Sidewalk Ends (1950) (all for Fox) and Angel Face (1952). A half-decade after Double Indemnity and The Lost Weekend, Billy Wilder made Sunset Boulevard (1950) and Ace in the Hole (1951), noirs that were not so much crime dramas as satires on Hollywood and the news media respectively. In a Lonely Place (1950) was Nicholas Ray's breakthrough; his other noirs include his debut, They Live by Night (1948) and On Dangerous Ground (1952), noted for their unusually sympathetic treatment of characters alienated from the social mainstream.

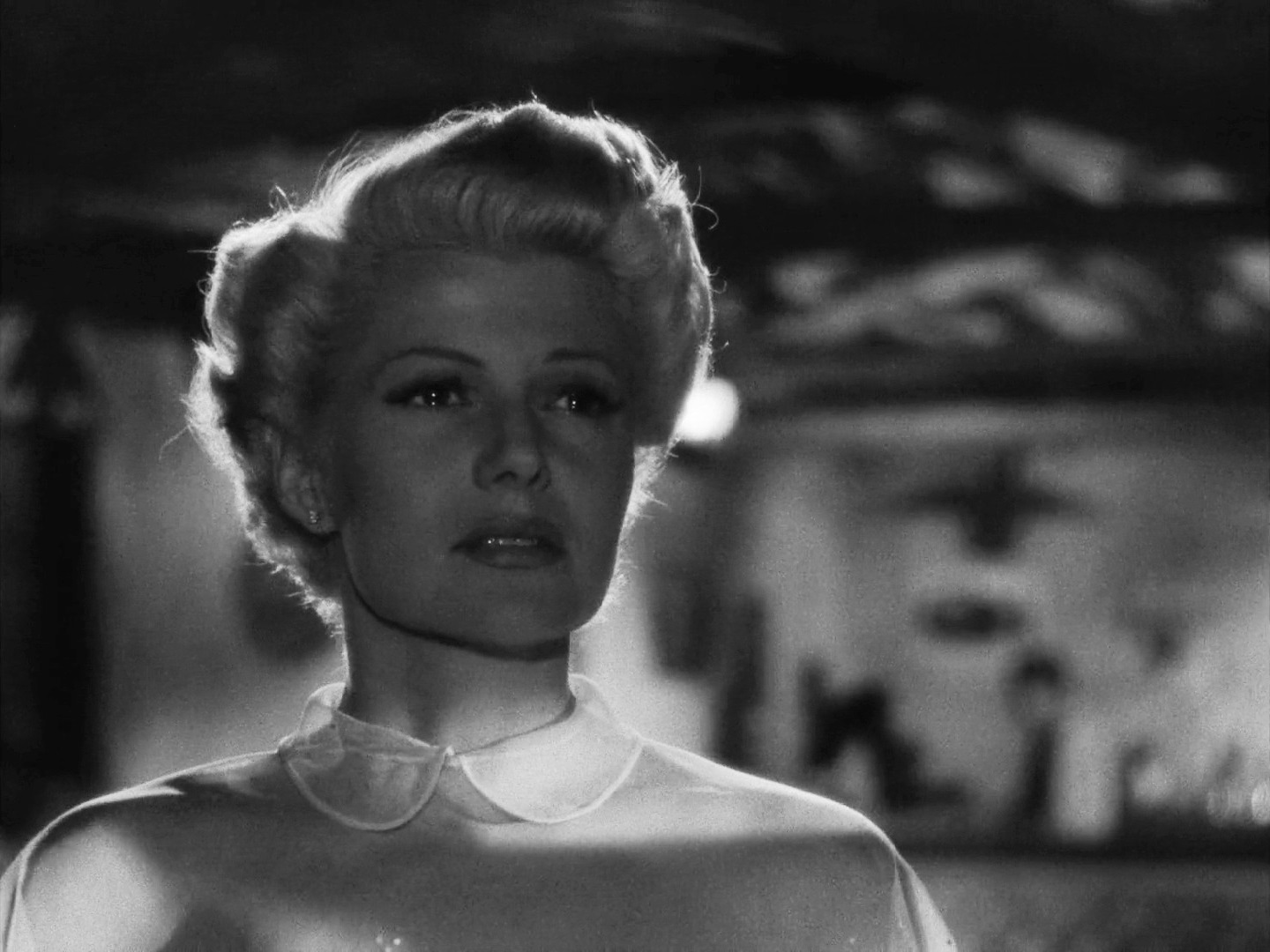
Rita Hayworth in the trailer for The Lady from Shanghai (1947)

Orson Welles had notorious problems with financing but his three film noirs were well-budgeted: The Lady from Shanghai (1947) received top-level, "prestige" backing, while The Stranger (1946), his most conventional film, and Touch of Evil (1958), an unmistakably personal work, were funded at levels lower but still commensurate with headlining releases. Like The Stranger, Fritz Lang's The Woman in the Window (1944) was a production of the independent International Pictures. Lang's follow-up, Scarlet Street (1945), was one of the few classic noirs to be officially censored: filled with erotic innuendo, it was temporarily banned in Milwaukee, Atlanta and New York State. Scarlet Street was a semi-independent, cosponsored by Universal and Lang's Diana Productions, of which the film's co-star, Joan Bennett, was the second biggest shareholder. Lang, Bennett and her husband, the Universal veteran and Diana production head Walter Wanger, made Secret Beyond the Door (1948) in similar fashion.

Before leaving the United States while subject to the Hollywood blacklist, Jules Dassin made two classic noirs that also straddled the major/independent line: Brute Force (1947) and the influential documentary-style The Naked City (1948) were developed by producer Mark Hellinger, who had an "inside/outside" contract with Universal similar to Wanger's. Years earlier, working at Warner Bros., Hellinger had produced three films for Raoul Walsh, the proto-noirs They Drive by Night (1940), Manpower (1941) and High Sierra (1941), now regarded as a seminal work in noir's development. Walsh had no great name during his half-century as a director but his noirs The Man I Love (1947), White Heat (1949) and The Enforcer (1951) had A-list stars and are seen as important examples of the cycle. Other directors associated with top-of-the-bill Hollywood film noirs include Edward Dmytryk (Murder, My Sweet (1944), Crossfire (1947))—the first important noir director to fall prey to the industry blacklist—as well as Henry Hathaway (The Dark Corner (1946), Kiss of Death (1947)) and John Farrow (The Big Clock (1948), Night Has a Thousand Eyes (1948)).

Most of the Hollywood films considered to be classic noirs fall into the category of the B movie. Some were Bs in the most precise sense, produced to run on the bottom of double bills by a low-budget unit of one of the major studios or by one of the smaller Poverty Row outfits, from the relatively well-off Monogram to shakier ventures such as Producers Releasing Corporation (PRC). Jacques Tourneur had made over thirty Hollywood Bs (a few now highly regarded, most forgotten) before directing the A-level Out of the Past, described by scholar Robert Ottoson as "the ne plus ultra of forties film noir". Movies with budgets a step up the ladder, known as "intermediates" by the industry, might be treated as A or B pictures depending on the circumstances. Monogram created Allied Artists in the late 1940s to focus on this sort of production. Robert Wise (Born to Kill [1947], The Set-Up [1949]) and Anthony Mann (T-Men [1947] and Raw Deal [1948]) each made a series of impressive intermediates, many of them noirs, before graduating to steady work on big-budget productions. Mann did some of his most celebrated work with cinematographer John Alton, a specialist in what James Naremore called "hypnotic moments of light-in-darkness". He Walked by Night (1948), shot by Alton though credited solely to Alfred Werker, directed in large part by Mann, demonstrates their technical mastery and exemplifies the late 1940s trend of "police procedural" crime dramas. It was released, like other Mann-Alton noirs, by the small Eagle-Lion company; it was the inspiration for the Dragnet series, which debuted on radio in 1949 and television in 1951.

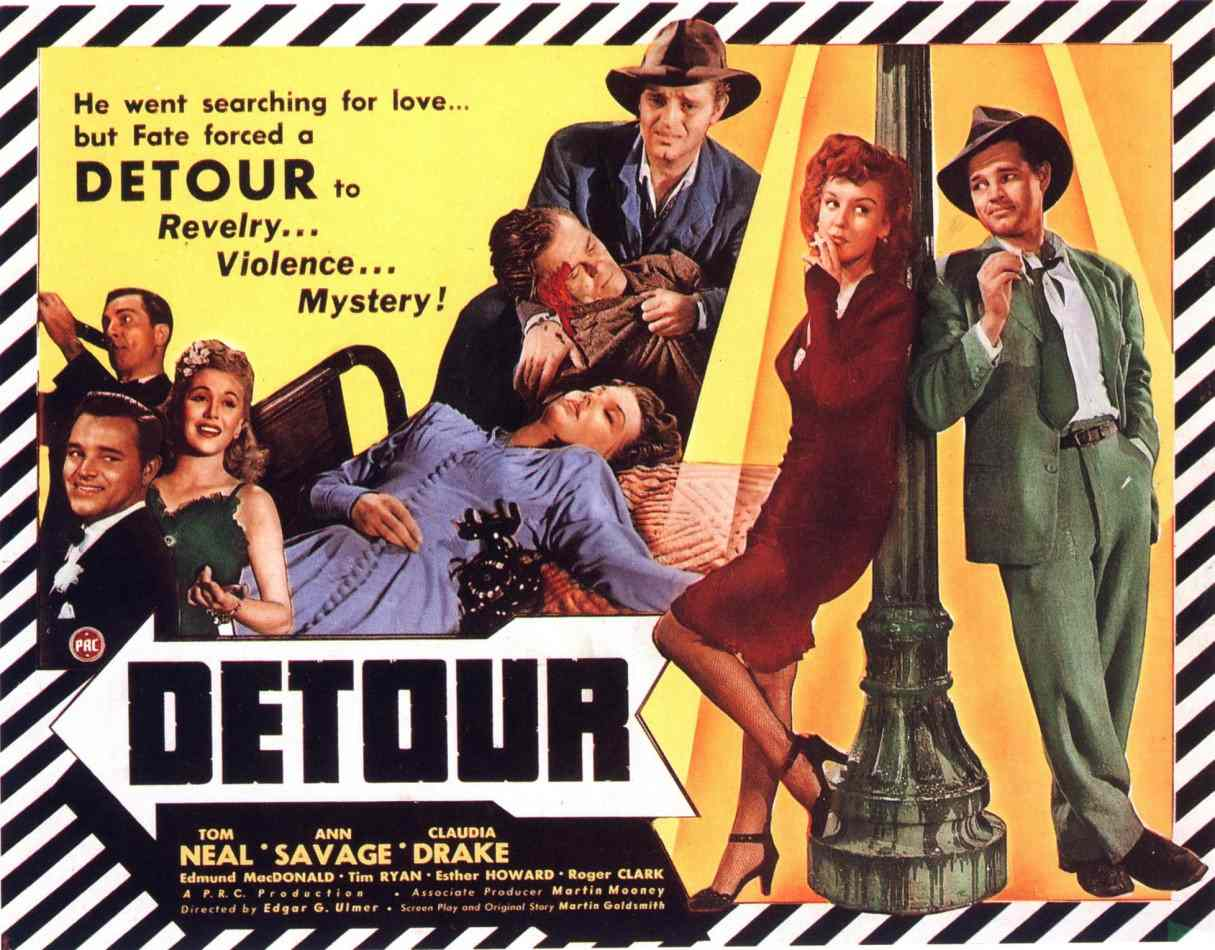
Detour (1945) cost $117,000 to make when the biggest Hollywood studios spent around $600,000 on the average feature. Produced at small PRC, however, the film was 30 percent over budget.

Several directors associated with noir built well-respected oeuvres largely at the B-movie/intermediate level. Samuel Fuller's brutal, visually energetic films such as Pickup on South Street (1953) and Underworld U.S.A. (1961) earned him a unique reputation; his advocates praise him as "primitive" and "barbarous". Joseph H. Lewis directed noirs as diverse as Gun Crazy (1950) and The Big Combo (1955). The former—whose screenplay was written by the blacklisted Dalton Trumbo, disguised by a front—features a bank hold-up sequence shown in an unbroken take of over three minutes that was influential. The Big Combo was shot by John Alton and took the shadowy noir style to its outer limits. The most distinctive films of Phil Karlson (The Phenix City Story [1955] and The Brothers Rico [1957]) tell stories of vice organized on a monstrous scale. The work of other directors in this tier of the industry, such as Felix E. Feist (The Devil Thumbs a Ride [1947], Tomorrow Is Another Day [1951]), has become obscure. Edgar G. Ulmer spent most of his Hollywood career working at B studios and once in a while on projects that achieved intermediate status; for the most part, on unmistakable Bs. In 1945, while at PRC, he directed a noir cult classic, Detour. Ulmer's other noirs include Strange Illusion (1945), also for PRC; Ruthless (1948), for Eagle-Lion, which had acquired PRC the previous year and Murder Is My Beat (1955), for Allied Artists.

A number of low- and modestly-budgeted noirs were made by independent, often actor-owned, companies contracting with larger studios for distribution. Serving as producer, writer, director and top-billed performer, Hugo Haas made films like Pickup (1951), The Other Woman (1954) and Jacques Tourneur, The Fearmakers (1958). It was in this way that accomplished noir actress Ida Lupino established herself as the sole female director in Hollywood during the late 1940s and much of the 1950s. She does not appear in the best-known film she directed, The Hitch-Hiker (1953), developed by her company, The Filmakers, with support and distribution by RKO. It is one of the seven classic film noirs produced largely outside of the major studios that have been chosen for the United States National Film Registry. Of the others, one was a small-studio release: Detour. Four were independent productions distributed by United Artists, the "studio without a studio": Gun Crazy; Kiss Me Deadly; D.O.A. (1950), directed by Rudolph Maté and Sweet Smell of Success (1957), directed by Alexander Mackendrick. One was an independent distributed by MGM, the industry leader: Force of Evil (1948), directed by Abraham Polonsky and starring John Garfield, both of whom were blacklisted in the 1950s. Independent production usually meant restricted circumstances but Sweet Smell of Success, despite the plans of the production team, was clearly not made on the cheap, though like many other cherished A-budget noirs, it might be said to have a B-movie soul.

Perhaps no director better displayed that spirit than the German-born Robert Siodmak, who had already made a score of films before his 1940 arrival in Hollywood. Working mostly on A features, he made eight films now regarded as classic-era noir (a figure matched only by Lang and Mann). In addition to The Killers, Burt Lancaster's debut and a Hellinger/Universal co-production, Siodmak's other important contributions to the genre include 1944's Phantom Lady (a top-of-the-line B and Woolrich adaptation), the ironically titled Christmas Holiday (1944), and Cry of the City (1948). Criss Cross (1949), with Lancaster again the lead, exemplifies how Siodmak brought the virtues of the B-movie to the A noir. In addition to the relatively looser constraints on character and message at lower budgets, the nature of B production lent itself to the noir style for economic reasons: dim lighting saved on electricity and helped cloak cheap sets (mist and smoke also served the cause). Night shooting was often compelled by hurried production schedules. Plots with obscure motivations and intriguingly elliptical transitions were sometimes the consequence of hastily written scripts. There was not always enough time or money to shoot every scene. In Criss Cross, Siodmak achieved these effects, wrapping them around Yvonne De Carlo, who played the most understandable of femme fatales; Dan Duryea, in one of his many charismatic villain roles; and Lancaster as an ordinary laborer turned armed robber, doomed by a romantic obsession.

	Classic-era film noirs in the National Film Registry
1940–49	The Maltese Falcon; Shadow of a Doubt; Laura; Double Indemnity; Mildred Pierce; The Lost Weekend; Detour; Gilda; The Big Sleep; The Killers; Notorious; Out of the Past; The Lady from Shanghai; Force of Evil; The Naked City; All the King's Men; White Heat
1950–58	Gun Crazy; D.O.A.; In a Lonely Place; The Asphalt Jungle; Sunset Boulevard; The Hitch-Hiker; The Big Heat; Kiss Me Deadly; The Night of the Hunter; The Phenix City Story; Sweet Smell of Success; Touch of Evil

== Outside the United States ==
"Générique" ("Nuit sur les Champs-Élysées")
The moody, evocative music improvised by jazz trumpeter Miles Davis's quintet for Ascenseur pour l'échafaud (1958) is regarded as one of the definitive noir scores.

Some critics regard classic film noir as a cycle exclusive to the United States; Alain Silver and Elizabeth Ward, for example, argue, "With the Western, film noir shares the distinction of being an indigenous American form ... a wholly American film style." However, although the term "film noir" was originally coined to describe Hollywood movies, it was an international phenomenon. Even before the beginning of the generally accepted classic period, there were films made far from Hollywood that can be seen in retrospect as film noirs, for example, the French productions Pépé le Moko (1937), directed by Julien Duvivier, and Le Jour se lève (1939), directed by Marcel Carné. In addition, Mexico experienced a vibrant film noir period from roughly 1946 to 1952, which was around the same time film noir was blossoming in the United States.

During the classic period, there were many films produced in Europe, particularly in France, that share elements of style, theme, and sensibility with American film noirs and may themselves be included in the genre's canon. In certain cases, the interrelationship with Hollywood noir is obvious: American-born director Jules Dassin moved to France in the early 1950s as a result of the Hollywood blacklist, and made one of the most famous French film noirs, Rififi (1955). Other well-known French films often classified as noir include Quai des Orfèvres (1947) and Les Diaboliques (1955), both directed by Henri-Georges Clouzot. Casque d'Or (1952), Touchez pas au grisbi (1954), and Le Trou (1960) directed by Jacques Becker; and Ascenseur pour l'échafaud (1958), directed by Louis Malle. French director Jean-Pierre Melville is widely recognized for his tragic, minimalist film noirs—Bob le flambeur (1955), from the classic period, was followed by Le Doulos (1962), Le deuxième souffle 1966), Le Samouraï (1967), and Le Cercle rouge (1970). In the 1960s, Greek film noirs "The Secret of the Red Mantle" and "The Fear" allowed audience for an anti-ableist reading which challenged stereotypes of disability.

Stray Dog (1949), directed and cowritten by Akira Kurosawa, contains many cinematographic and narrative elements associated with classic American film noir.

Scholar Andrew Spicer argues that British film noir evidences a greater debt to French poetic realism than to the expressionistic American mode of noir. Examples of British noir (sometimes described as "Brit noir") from the classic period include Brighton Rock (1947), directed by John Boulting; They Made Me a Fugitive (1947), directed by Alberto Cavalcanti; The October Man (1947), directed by Roy Ward Baker; The Small Back Room (1948), directed by Michael Powell and Emeric Pressburger; and Cast a Dark Shadow (1955), directed by Lewis Gilbert. Terence Fisher directed several low-budget thrillers in a noir mode for Hammer Film Productions, including The Last Page (a.k.a. Man Bait; 1952), Stolen Face (1952), and Murder by Proxy (a.k.a. Blackout; 1954). Before leaving for France, Jules Dassin had been obliged by political pressure to shoot his last English-language film of the classic noir period in Great Britain: Night and the City (1950). Though it was conceived in the United States and was not only directed by an American but also stars two American actors—Richard Widmark and Gene Tierney—it is technically a UK production, financed by 20th Century-Fox's British subsidiary. The most famous of classic British noirs is director Carol Reed's The Third Man (1949), from a screenplay by Graham Greene. Set in Vienna immediately after World War II, it also stars two American actors, Joseph Cotten and Orson Welles, who had appeared together in Citizen Kane.

Elsewhere, Italian director Luchino Visconti adapted Cain's The Postman Always Rings Twice as Ossessione (1943), regarded both as one of the great noirs and a seminal film in the development of neorealism. (This was not even the first screen version of Cain's novel, having been preceded by the French Le Dernier Tournant in 1939.) In Japan, the celebrated Akira Kurosawa directed several films recognizable as film noirs, including Drunken Angel (1948), Stray Dog (1949), The Bad Sleep Well (1960), and High and Low (1963). Spanish author Mercedes Formica's novel La ciudad perdida (The Lost City) was adapted into film in 1955.

Among the first major neo-noir films—the term often applied to films that consciously refer back to the classic noir tradition—was the French Tirez sur le pianiste (1960), directed by François Truffaut from a novel by one of the gloomiest of American noir fiction writers, David Goodis. Noir crime films and melodramas have been produced in many countries in the post-classic area. Some of these are quintessentially self-aware neo-noirs—for example, Il Conformista (1969; Italy), Der Amerikanische Freund (1977; Germany), The Fourth Man (1983; Netherlands), The Element of Crime (1984; Denmark), and El Aura (2005; Argentina). Others simply share narrative elements and a version of the hardboiled sensibility associated with classic noir, such as Castle of Sand (1974; Japan), Insomnia (1997; Norway), Croupier (1998; UK), and Blind Shaft (2003; China).

== Neo-noir and echoes of the classic mode ==
The neo-noir film genre developed mid-way into the Cold War. This cinematological trend reflected much of the cynicism and the possibility of nuclear annihilation of the era. This new genre introduced innovations that were not available to earlier noir films. The violence was also more potent.

=== 1960s and 1970s ===
While it is hard to draw a line between some of the noir films of the early 1960s such as Blast of Silence (1961) and Cape Fear (1962) and the noirs of the late 1950s, new trends emerged in the post-classic era. The Manchurian Candidate (1962), directed by John Frankenheimer, Shock Corridor (1963), directed by Samuel Fuller, and Brainstorm (1965), directed by experienced noir character actor William Conrad, all treat the theme of mental dispossession within stylistic and tonal frameworks derived from classic film noir. The Manchurian Candidate examined the situation of American prisoners of war (POWs) during the Korean War. Incidents that occurred during the war as well as those post-war functioned as an inspiration for a "Cold War Noir" subgenre. The television series The Fugitive (1963–67) brought classic noir themes and mood to the small screen for an extended run.

As car thief Michel Poiccard, a.k.a. Laszlo Kovacs, Jean-Paul Belmondo in À bout de souffle (Breathless; 1960). Poiccard reveres and styles himself after Humphrey Bogart's screen persona. Here he imitates a characteristic Bogart gesture, one of the film's motifs.

In a different vein, films began to appear that self-consciously acknowledged the conventions of classic film noir as historical archetypes to be revived, rejected, or reimagined. These efforts typify what came to be known as neo-noir. Though several late classic noirs, Kiss Me Deadly (1955) in particular, were deeply self-knowing and post-traditional in conception, none tipped its hand so evidently as to be remarked on by American critics at the time. The first major film to overtly work this angle was French director Jean-Luc Godard's À bout de souffle (Breathless; 1960), which pays its literal respects to Bogart and his crime films while brandishing a bold new style for a new day. In the United States, Arthur Penn (1965's Mickey One, drawing inspiration from Truffaut's Tirez sur le pianiste and other French New Wave films), John Boorman (1967's Point Blank, similarly caught up, though in the Nouvelle vague's deeper waters), and Alan J. Pakula (1971's Klute) directed films that knowingly related themselves to the original film noirs, inviting audiences in on the game.

A manifest affiliation with noir traditions—which, by its nature, allows different sorts of commentary on them to be inferred—can also provide the basis for explicit critiques of those traditions. In 1973, director Robert Altman flipped off noir piety with The Long Goodbye. Based on the novel by Raymond Chandler, it features one of Bogart's most famous characters, but in iconoclastic fashion: Philip Marlowe, the prototypical hardboiled detective, is replayed as a hapless misfit, almost laughably out of touch with contemporary mores and morality. Where Altman's subversion of the film noir mythos was so irreverent as to outrage some contemporary critics, around the same time Woody Allen was paying affectionate, at points idolatrous homage to the classic mode with Play It Again, Sam (1972). The "blaxploitation" film Shaft (1971), wherein Richard Roundtree plays the titular African-American private eye, John Shaft, takes conventions from classic noir.

The most acclaimed of the neo-noirs of the era was director Roman Polanski's 1974 Chinatown. Written by Robert Towne, it is set in 1930s Los Angeles, an accustomed noir locale nudged back some few years in a way that makes the pivotal loss of innocence in the story even crueler. Where Polanski and Towne raised noir to a black apogee by turning rearward, director Martin Scorsese and screenwriter Paul Schrader brought the noir attitude crashing into the present day with Taxi Driver (1976), a crackling, bloody-minded gloss on bicentennial America. In 1978, Walter Hill wrote and directed The Driver, a chase film as might have been imagined by Jean-Pierre Melville in an especially abstract mood.

Hill was already a central figure in 1970s noir of a more straightforward manner, having written the script for director Sam Peckinpah's The Getaway (1972), adapting a novel by pulp master Jim Thompson, as well as for two tough private eye films: an original screenplay for Hickey & Boggs (1972) and an adaptation of a novel by Ross Macdonald, the leading literary descendant of Hammett and Chandler, for The Drowning Pool (1975). Some of the strongest 1970s noirs, in fact, were unwinking remakes of the classics, "neo" mostly by default: the heartbreaking Thieves Like Us (1974), directed by Altman from the same source as Ray's They Live by Night, and Farewell, My Lovely (1975), the Chandler tale made classically as Murder, My Sweet, remade here with Robert Mitchum in his last notable noir role. Detective series, prevalent on American television during the period, updated the hardboiled tradition in different ways, but the show conjuring the most noir tone was a horror crossover touched with shaggy, Long Goodbye-style humor: Kolchak: The Night Stalker (1974–75), featuring a Chicago newspaper reporter investigating strange, usually supernatural occurrences.

=== 1980s and 1990s ===
Sharon Stone as Catherine Tramell, archetypal modern femme fatale, in Basic Instinct (1992). Her diabolic nature is underscored by an "extra-lurid visual code", as in the notorious interrogation scene.

The turn of the decade brought Scorsese's black-and-white Raging Bull (1980, cowritten by Schrader). An acknowledged masterpiece—in 2007 the American Film Institute ranked it as the greatest American film of the 1980s and the fourth greatest of all time—it tells the story of a boxer's moral self-destruction that recalls in both theme and visual ambiance noir dramas such as Body and Soul (1947) and Champion (1949). From 1981, Body Heat, written and directed by Lawrence Kasdan, invokes a different set of classic noir elements, this time in a humid, erotically charged Florida setting. Its success confirmed the commercial viability of neo-noir at a time when the major Hollywood studios were becoming increasingly risk averse. The mainstreaming of neo-noir is evident in such films as Black Widow (1987), Shattered (1991), and Final Analysis (1992). Few neo-noirs have made more money or more wittily updated the tradition of the noir double entendre than Basic Instinct (1992), directed by Paul Verhoeven and written by Joe Eszterhas. The film also demonstrates how neo-noir's polychrome palette can reproduce many of the expressionistic effects of classic black-and-white noir.

Like Chinatown, its more complex predecessor, Curtis Hanson's Oscar-winning L.A. Confidential (1997), based on the James Ellroy novel, demonstrates the opposite tendency—the deliberately retro film noir; its tale of corrupt cops and femmes fatale is seemingly lifted straight from a film of 1953, the year in which it is set. Director David Fincher followed the immensely successful neo-noir Seven (1995) with a film that developed into a cult favorite after its original, disappointing release: Fight Club (1999), a sui generis mix of noir aesthetic, perverse comedy, speculative content, and satiric intent.

"Dub Driving"
Angelo Badalamenti has scored most of David Lynch's noir-related work. His work on this track typifies a "modern noir" style, which the director explicitly sought for Lost Highway (1997).

Working generally with much smaller budgets, brothers Joel and Ethan Coen have created one of the most extensive oeuvres influenced by classic noir, with films such as Blood Simple (1984) and Fargo (1996), the latter considered by some a supreme work in the neo-noir mode. The Coens cross noir with other generic traditions in the gangster drama Miller's Crossing (1990)—loosely based on the Dashiell Hammett novels Red Harvest and The Glass Key—and the comedy The Big Lebowski (1998), a tribute to Chandler and an homage to Altman's version of The Long Goodbye. The characteristic work of David Lynch combines film noir tropes with scenarios driven by disturbed characters such as the sociopathic criminal played by Dennis Hopper in Blue Velvet (1986) and the delusionary protagonist of Lost Highway (1997). The Twin Peaks cycle, both the TV series (1990–91) and a film, Fire Walk with Me (1992), puts a detective plot through a succession of bizarre spasms. David Cronenberg also mixes surrealism and noir in Naked Lunch (1991), inspired by William S. Burroughs' novel.

Perhaps no American neo-noirs better reflect the classic noir B movie spirit than those of director-writer Quentin Tarantino. Neo-noirs of his such as Reservoir Dogs (1992) and Pulp Fiction (1994) display a relentlessly self-reflexive, sometimes tongue-in-cheek sensibility, similar to the work of the New Wave directors and the Coens. Other films from the era readily identifiable as neo-noir (some retro, some more au courant) include director John Dahl's Kill Me Again (1989), Red Rock West (1992), and The Last Seduction (1993); four adaptations of novels by Jim Thompson—The Kill-Off (1989), After Dark, My Sweet (1990), The Grifters (1990), and the remake of The Getaway (1994); and many more, including adaptations of the work of other major noir fiction writers: The Hot Spot (1990), from Hell Hath No Fury, by Charles Williams; Miami Blues (1990), from the novel by Charles Willeford; and Out of Sight (1998), from the novel by Elmore Leonard. Several films by director-writer David Mamet involve noir elements: House of Games (1987), Homicide (1991), The Spanish Prisoner (1997), and Heist (2001). On television, Moonlighting (1985–89) paid homage to classic noir while demonstrating an unusual appreciation of the sense of humor often found in the original cycle. Between 1983 and 1989, Mickey Spillane's hardboiled private eye Mike Hammer was played with wry gusto by Stacy Keach in a series and several stand-alone television films (an unsuccessful revival followed in 1997–98). The British miniseries The Singing Detective (1986), written by Dennis Potter, tells the story of a mystery writer named Philip Marlow; widely considered one of the finest neo-noirs in any medium, some critics rank it among the greatest television productions of all time.

=== Neo-noir ===
Among big-budget auteurs, Michael Mann has worked frequently in a neo-noir mode, with such films as Thief (1981) and Heat (1995) and the TV series Miami Vice (1984–89) and Crime Story (1986–88). Mann's output exemplifies a primary strain of neo-noir, or as it is affectionately called, "neon noir", in which classic themes and tropes are revisited in a contemporary setting with an up-to-date visual style and rock- or hip-hop-based musical soundtrack.

Neon-noir film borrows from and reflects many of the characteristics of the film noir: the presence of crime and violence, complex characters and plot-lines, mystery, and moral ambivalence, all of which come into play in the neon-noir sub-genre. But more than just exhibiting the superficial traits of the genre, neon-noir emphasizes the socio-critique of film noir, recalling the specific socio-cultural dimensions of the interwar years when noirs first became prominent; a time of global existential crisis, depression and the mass movement of the rural population to cities. Long shots or montages of cityscapes, often portrayed as dark and menacing, are suggestive of what Dueck referred to as a 'bleak societal perspective', providing a critique on global capitalism and consumerism. Other characteristics include the use of highly stylized lighting techniques such chiaroscuro, and neon signs and brightly lit buildings that provide a sense of alienation and entrapment.

Accentuating the use of artificial and neon lighting in the films-noir of the '40s and '50s, neon-noir films accentuate this aesthetic with electrifying color and manipulated light in order to highlight their socio-cultural critiques and their references to contemporary and pop culture. In doing so, neon-noir films present the themes of urban decay, consumerist decadence and capitalism, existentialism, sexuality, and issues of race and violence in the contemporary culture, not only in America, but the globalized world at large.

Neon-noirs seek to bring the contemporary noir, somewhat diluted under the umbrella of neo-noir, back to the exploration of culture: class, race, gender, patriarchy, and capitalism. Neon-noirs present an existential exploration of society in a hyper-technological and globalized world. Illustrating society as decadent and consumerist, and identity as confused and anxious, neon-noirs reposition the contemporary noir in the setting of urban decay, often featuring scenes set in underground city haunts: brothels, nightclubs, casinos, strip bars, pawnshops, laundromats.

Neon-noirs were popularized in the '70s and '80s by films such as Taxi Driver (1976), Blade Runner (1982), and films from David Lynch, such as Blue Velvet (1986) and later, Lost Highway (1997). Other titles from this era included Brian De Palma's Blow Out (1981) and the Coen Brothers' debut Blood Simple (1984). More currently, films such as Harmony Korine's highly provocative Spring Breakers (2012), and Danny Boyle's Trance (2013) have been especially noted for their neon-infused rendering of film noir; while Trance was celebrated for 'shak(ing) the ingredients (of the noir) like colored sand in a jar', Spring Breakers notoriously produced a slew of criticism referring to its 'fever-dream' aesthetic and 'neon-caked explosion of excess' (Kohn).

Neon-noir can be seen as a response to the over-use of the term neo-noir. While the term neo-noir functions to bring noir into the contemporary landscape, it has often been criticized for its dilution of the noir genre. Author Robert Arnett commented on its "amorphous" reach: "any film featuring a detective or crime qualifies". The neon-noir, more specifically, seeks to revive noir sensibilities in a more targeted manner of reference, focalizing socio-cultural commentary and a hyper-stylized aesthetic.

=== 2000s and 2010s ===
The Coen brothers make reference to the noir tradition again with The Man Who Wasn't There (2001); a black-and-white crime melodrama set in 1949; it features a scene apparently staged to mirror one from Out of the Past. Lynch's Mulholland Drive (2001) continued in his characteristic vein, making the classic noir setting of Los Angeles the venue for a noir-inflected psychological jigsaw puzzle. British-born director Christopher Nolan's black-and-white debut, Following (1998), was an overt homage to classic noir. During the new century's first decade, he was one of the leading Hollywood directors of neo-noir with the acclaimed Memento (2000) and the remake of Insomnia (2002).

Director Sean Penn's The Pledge (2001), though adapted from a very self-reflexive novel by Friedrich Dürrenmatt, plays noir comparatively straight, to devastating effect. Screenwriter David Ayer updated the classic noir bad-cop tale, typified by Shield for Murder (1954) and Rogue Cop (1954), with his scripts for Training Day (2001) and, adapting a story by James Ellroy, Dark Blue (2002); he later wrote and directed the even darker Harsh Times (2006). Michael Mann's Collateral (2004) features a performance by Tom Cruise as an assassin in the lineage of Le Samouraï. The torments of The Machinist (2004), directed by Brad Anderson, evoke both Fight Club and Memento. In 2005, Shane Black directed Kiss Kiss Bang Bang, basing his screenplay in part on a crime novel by Brett Halliday, who published his first stories back in the 1920s. The film plays with an awareness not only of classic noir but also of neo-noir reflexivity itself.

With ultra-violent films such as Sympathy for Mr. Vengeance (2002) and Thirst (2009), Park Chan-wook of South Korea has been the most prominent director outside of the United States to work regularly in a noir mode in the new millennium. The most commercially successful neo-noir of this period has been Sin City (2005), directed by Robert Rodriguez in extravagantly stylized black and white with splashes of color. The film is based on a series of comic books created by Frank Miller (credited as the film's codirector), which are in turn openly indebted to the works of Spillane and other pulp mystery authors. Similarly, graphic novels provide the basis for Road to Perdition (2002), directed by Sam Mendes, and A History of Violence (2005), directed by David Cronenberg; the latter was voted best film of the year in the annual Village Voice poll. Writer-director Rian Johnson's Brick (2005), featuring present-day high schoolers speaking a version of 1930s hardboiled argot, won the Special Jury Prize for Originality of Vision at the Sundance Film Festival. The television series Veronica Mars (2004–07, 2019) and the movie Veronica Mars (2014) also brought a youth-oriented twist to film noir. Examples of this sort of generic crossover have been dubbed "teen noir".

Neo-noir films released in the 2010s include Kim Jee-woon's I Saw the Devil (2010), Fred Cavaye's Point Blank (2010), Na Hong-jin's The Yellow Sea (2010), Nicolas Winding Refn's Drive (2011), Claire Denis' Bastards (2013) and Dan Gilroy's Nightcrawler (2014).

=== 2020s ===
The Science Channel broadcast the 2021 science documentary series Killers of the Cosmos in a format it describes as "space noir." In the series, actor Aidan Gillen in animated form serves as the host of the series while portraying a private investigator who takes on "cases" in which he "hunts down" lethal threats to humanity posed by the cosmos. The animated sequences combine the characteristics of film noir with those of a pulp fiction graphic novel set in the mid-20th century, and they link conventional live-action documentary segments in which experts describe the potentially deadly phenomena.

=== Science fiction noir ===
Harrison Ford as detective Rick Deckard in Blade Runner (1982). Like many classic noirs, the film is set in a version of Los Angeles where it constantly rains. The steam in the foreground is a familiar noir trope, while the "bluish-smoky exterior" updates the black-and-white mode.

In the post-classic era, a significant trend in noir crossovers has involved science fiction. In Jean-Luc Godard's Alphaville (1965), Lemmy Caution is the name of the old-school private eye in the city of tomorrow. The Groundstar Conspiracy (1972) centers on another implacable investigator and an amnesiac named Welles. Soylent Green (1973), the first major American example, portrays a dystopian, near-future world via a noir detection plot; starring Charlton Heston (the lead in Touch of Evil), it also features classic noir standbys Joseph Cotten, Edward G. Robinson, and Whit Bissell. The film was directed by Richard Fleischer, who two decades before had directed several strong B noirs, including Armored Car Robbery (1950) and The Narrow Margin (1952).

The cynical and stylized perspective of classic film noir had a formative effect on the cyberpunk genre of science fiction that emerged in the early 1980s; the film most directly influential on cyberpunk was Blade Runner (1982), directed by Ridley Scott, which pays evocative homage to the classic noir mode (Scott subsequently directed the poignant 1987 noir crime melodrama Someone to Watch Over Me). Scholar Jamaluddin Bin Aziz has observed how "the shadow of Philip Marlowe lingers on" in such other "future noir" films as 12 Monkeys (1995), Dark City (1998) and Minority Report (2002). Fincher's feature debut was Alien 3 (1992), which evoked the classic noir jail film Brute Force.

David Cronenberg's Crash (1996), an adaptation of the speculative novel by J. G. Ballard, has been described as a "film noir in bruise tones". The hero is the target of investigation in Gattaca (1997), which fuses film noir motifs with a scenario indebted to Brave New World. The Thirteenth Floor (1999), like Blade Runner, is an explicit homage to classic noir, in this case involving speculations about virtual reality. Science fiction, noir, and anime are brought together in the Japanese films of 90s Ghost in the Shell (1995) and Ghost in the Shell 2: Innocence (2004), both directed by Mamoru Oshii. The Animatrix (2003), based on and set within the world of The Matrix film trilogy, contains an anime short film in classic noir style titled "A Detective Story". Anime television series with science fiction noir themes include Noir (2001) and Cowboy Bebop (1998).

The 2015 film Ex Machina puts an understated film noir spin on the Frankenstein mythos, with the sentient android Ava as a potential femme fatale, her creator Nathan embodying the abusive husband or father trope, and her would-be rescuer Caleb as a "clueless drifter" enthralled by Ava.

=== Rural/outback noir ===
A sub-genre of noir fiction has been named "rural noir" in the US; and sometimes "outback noir" in Australia. Many rural noir novels have been adapted for film and TV series in both countries, such as Ozark, No Country for Old Men, and Big Sky in the US, and Troppo, The Dry (and its sequel Force of Nature: The Dry 2), Scrublands, and High Country (2024) in Australia.

In Australia, outback noir increasingly includes issues relating to Indigenous Australians, such as the dispossession of land from Aboriginal peoples and racism. Filmmaker Ivan Sen is known for his exploration of such themes in his Mystery Road TV series and film of the same name with its prequel Goldstone, and his more recent award-winning film Limbo (2023).

== Parodies ==
Film noir has been parodied many times in many manners. In 1945, Danny Kaye starred in what appears to be the first intentional film noir parody, Wonder Man. That same year, Deanna Durbin was the singing lead in the comedic noir Lady on a Train, which makes fun of Woolrich-brand wistful miserablism. Bob Hope inaugurated the private-eye noir parody with My Favorite Brunette (1947), playing a baby-photographer who is mistaken for an ironfisted detective. In 1947 as well, The Bowery Boys appeared in Hard Boiled Mahoney, which had a similar mistaken-identity plot; they spoofed the genre once more in Private Eyes (1953). Two RKO productions starring Robert Mitchum take film noir over the border into self-parody: The Big Steal (1949), directed by Don Siegel, and His Kind of Woman (1951).^{[b]} The "Girl Hunt" ballet in Vincente Minnelli's The Band Wagon (1953) is a ten-minute distillation of—and play on—noir in dance. The Cheap Detective (1978), starring Peter Falk, is a broad spoof of several films, including the Bogart classics The Maltese Falcon and Casablanca. Carl Reiner's black-and-white Dead Men Don't Wear Plaid (1982) appropriates clips of classic noirs for a farcical pastiche, while his Fatal Instinct (1993) sends up noir classic (Double Indemnity) and neo-noir (Basic Instinct). Robert Zemeckis's Who Framed Roger Rabbit (1988) develops a noir plot set in 1940s Los Angeles around a host of cartoon characters.

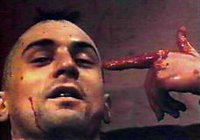
"Loneliness has followed me my whole life, everywhere. In bars, in cars, sidewalks, stores, everywhere. There's no escape. I'm God's lonely man." Robert De Niro as neo-noir antihero Travis Bickle in Taxi Driver (1976)

Noir parodies come in darker tones as well. Murder by Contract (1958), directed by Irving Lerner, is a deadpan joke on noir, with a denouement as bleak as any of the films it kids. An ultra-low-budget Columbia Pictures production, it may qualify as the first intentional example of what is now called a neo-noir film; it was likely a source of inspiration for both Melville's Le Samouraï and Scorsese's Taxi Driver. Belying its parodic strain, The Long Goodbye's final act is seriously grave. Taxi Driver caustically deconstructs the "dark" crime film, taking it to an absurd extreme and then offering a conclusion that manages to mock every possible anticipated ending—triumphant, tragic, artfully ambivalent—while being each, all at once. Flirting with splatter status even more brazenly, the Coens' Blood Simple is both an exacting pastiche and a gross exaggeration of classic noir. Adapted by director Robinson Devor from a novel by Charles Willeford, The Woman Chaser (1999) sends up not just the noir mode but the entire Hollywood filmmaking process, with each shot seemingly staged as the visual equivalent of an acerbic Marlowe wisecrack.

In other media, the television series Sledge Hammer! (1986–88) lampoons noir, along with such topics as capital punishment, gun fetishism, and Dirty Harry. Sesame Street (1969–curr.) occasionally casts Kermit the Frog as a private eye; the sketches refer to some of the typical motifs of noir films, in particular the voiceover. Garrison Keillor's radio program A Prairie Home Companion features the recurring character Guy Noir, a hardboiled detective whose adventures always wander into farce (Guy also appears in the Altman-directed film based on Keillor's show). Firesign Theatre's Nick Danger has trodden the same not-so-mean streets, both on radio and in comedy albums. Cartoons such as Garfield's Babes and Bullets (1989) and comic strip characters such as Tracer Bullet of Calvin and Hobbes have parodied both film noir and the kindred hardboiled tradition—one of the sources from which film noir sprang and which it now overshadows. It's Always Sunny in Philadelphia parodied the noir genre in its season 14 episode "The Janitor Always Mops Twice."

== Identifying characteristics ==
Some consider Vertigo (1958) a noir on the basis of plot and tone and various motifs, but it has a modernist graphic design typical of the 1950s and a more modern set design, which would remove it from the category of film noir. Others say the combination of color and the specificity of director Alfred Hitchcock's vision exclude it from the category.

In their original 1955 canon of film noir, Raymond Borde and Etienne Chaumeton identified twenty-two Hollywood films released between 1941 and 1952 as core examples; they listed another fifty-nine American films from the period as significantly related to the field of noir. A half-century later, film historians and critics had come to agree on a canon of approximately three hundred films from 1940 to 1958. There remain, however, many differences of opinion over whether other films of the era, among them a number of well-known ones, qualify as film noirs or not. For instance, The Night of the Hunter (1955), starring Robert Mitchum in an acclaimed performance, is treated as a film noir by some critics, but not by others. Some critics include Suspicion (1941), directed by Alfred Hitchcock, in their catalogues of noir; others ignore it. Concerning films made either before or after the classic period, or outside of the United States at any time, consensus is even rarer.

To support their categorization of certain films as noirs and their rejection of others, many critics refer to a set of elements they see as marking examples of the mode. The question of what constitutes the set of noir's identifying characteristics is a fundamental source of controversy. For instance, critics tend to define the model film noir as having a tragic or bleak conclusion, but many acknowledged classics of the genre have clearly happy endings (e.g., Stranger on the Third Floor, The Big Sleep, Dark Passage, and The Dark Corner), while the tone of many other noir denouements is ambivalent. Some critics perceive classic noir's hallmark as a distinctive visual style. Others, observing that there is actually considerable stylistic variety among noirs, instead emphasize plot and character type. Still others focus on mood and attitude. No survey of classic noir's identifying characteristics can therefore be considered definitive. In the 1990s and 2000s, critics have increasingly turned their attention to that diverse field of films called neo-noir; once again, there is even less consensus about the defining attributes of such films made outside the classic period. Roger Ebert offered "A Guide to Film Noir", writing that "Film noir is...

1. A French term meaning 'black film', or film of the night, inspired by the Series Noir, a line of cheap paperbacks that translated hard-boiled American crime authors and found a popular audience in France
2. A movie which at no time misleads you into thinking there is going to be a happy ending.
3. Locations that reek of the night, of shadows, of alleys, of the back doors of fancy places, of apartment buildings with a high turnover rate, of taxi drivers and bartenders who have seen it all.
4. Cigarettes. Everyone in film noir is always smoking, as if to say, 'On top of everything else, I've been assigned to get through three packs today. The best smoking movie of all time is Out of the Past, in which Robert Mitchum and Kirk Douglas smoke furiously at each other. At one point, Mitchum enters a room, Douglas extends a pack and says 'Cigarette?' and Mitchum, holding up his hand, says, 'Smoking.'
5. Women who would just as soon kill you as love you, and vice versa.
6. For women: low necklines, floppy hats, mascara, lipstick, dressing rooms, boudoirs, calling the doorman by his first name, high heels, red dresses, elbowlength gloves, mixing drinks, having gangsters as boyfriends, having soft spots for alcoholic private eyes, wanting a lot of someone else's women, sprawling dead on the floor with every limb meticulously arranged and every hair in place.
7. For men: fedoras, suits and ties, shabby residential hotels with a neon sign blinking through the window, buying yourself a drink out of the office bottle, cars with running boards, all-night diners, protecting kids who shouldn't be playing with the big guys, being on first-name terms with homicide cops, knowing a lot of people whose descriptions end in 'ies,' such as bookies, newsies, junkies, alkys, jockeys and cabbies.
8. Movies either shot in black-and-white, or feeling like they were.
9. Relationships in which love is only the final flop card in the poker game of death.
10. The most American film genre, because no other society could have created a world so full of doom, fate, fear and betrayal, unless it were essentially naive and optimistic."

=== Visual style ===
The low-key lighting schemes of many classic film noirs are associated with stark light/dark contrasts and dramatic shadow patterning—a style known as chiaroscuro (a term adopted from Renaissance painting).^{[c]} The shadows of Venetian blinds or banister rods, cast upon an actor, a wall, or an entire set, are an iconic visual in noir and had already become a cliché well before the neo-noir era. Characters' faces may be partially or wholly obscured by darkness—a relative rarity in conventional Hollywood filmmaking. While black-and-white cinematography is considered by many to be one of the essential attributes of classic noir, the color films Leave Her to Heaven (1945) and Niagara (1953) are routinely included in noir filmographies, while Slightly Scarlet (1956), Party Girl (1958), and Vertigo (1958) are classified as noir by varying numbers of critics.

Film noir is also known for its use of low-angle, wide-angle, and skewed, or Dutch angle shots. Other devices of disorientation relatively common in film noir include shots of people reflected in one or more mirrors, shots through curved or frosted glass or other distorting objects (such as during the strangulation scene in Strangers on a Train), and special effects sequences of a sometimes bizarre nature. Night-for-night shooting, as opposed to the Hollywood norm of day-for-night, was often employed. From the mid-1940s forward, location shooting became increasingly frequent in noir.

In an analysis of the visual approach of Kiss Me Deadly, a late and self-consciously stylized example of classic noir, critic Alain Silver describes how cinematographic choices emphasize the story's themes and mood. In one scene, the characters, seen through a "confusion of angular shapes", thus appear "caught in a tangible vortex or enclosed in a trap." Silver makes a case for how "side light is used ... to reflect character ambivalence", while shots of characters in which they are lit from below "conform to a convention of visual expression which associates shadows cast upward of the face with the unnatural and ominous".

Certain technological advancements in film stock allowed for film noir to achieve its distinctive look. Beginning in 1935, Eastman Kodak released a new, higher-speed film stock, which found particular usage in documentary/newsreel-types of filmmaking where on-location shooting was required. Cinematographers soon caught on to the potential for this new technology and began using it. The advantage of this new film stock was that, because it captured light faster, the film cells could effectively absorb more light with each exposure, eliminating the need to flood the set with light. Thus, cinematographers could be far more expressive in their lighting, allowing for darker scenes dominated by shadows. However, by the 1950s, the very unstable nitrate film stock was universally replaced with the far more stable acetate "safety film." The trade-off, however, was that this film stock produced an image with significantly less contrast. Thus, the high-contrast, black-and-white imagery that was essential to film noir effectively disappeared with the more greyscale imagery of the acetate, and it forced the other elements of film noir to be emphasized.

=== Structure and narrational devices ===
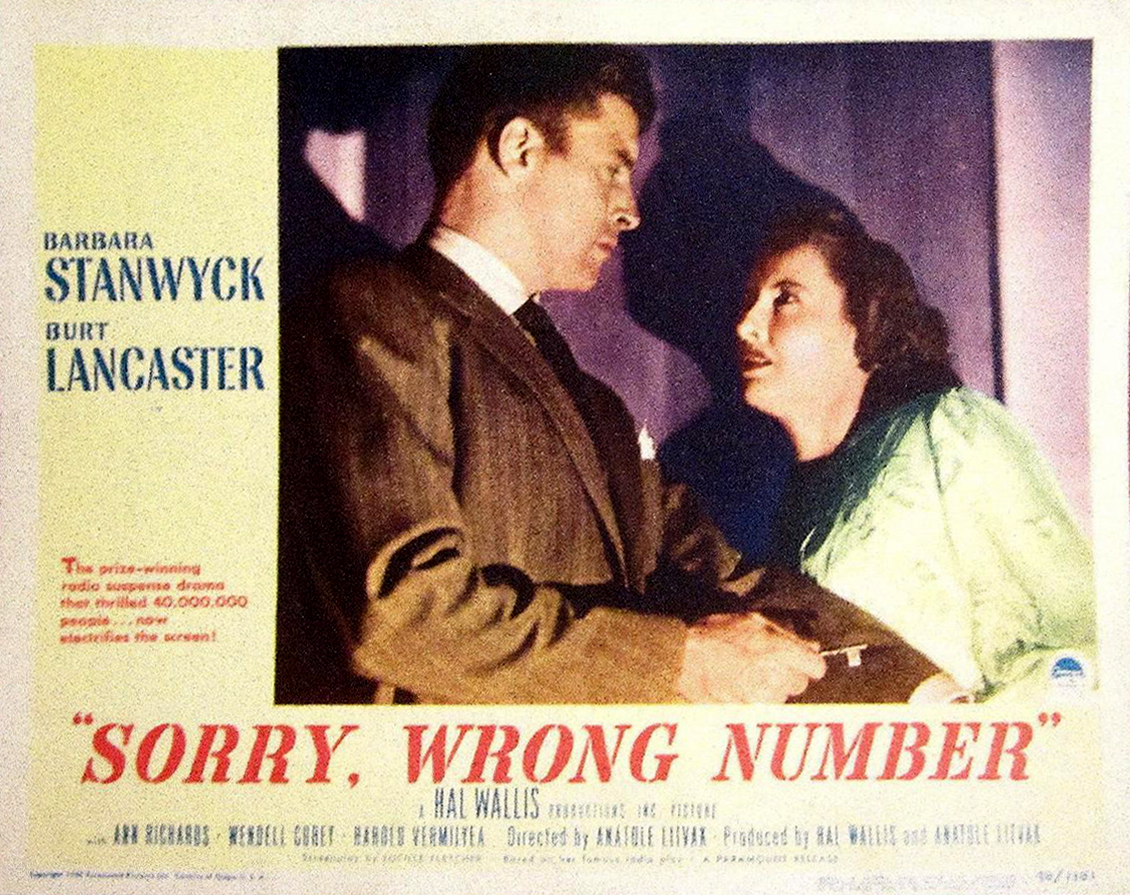
Barbara Stanwyck and Burt Lancaster were two of the most prolific stars of classic noir. The complex structure of Sorry, Wrong Number (1948) involves a real-time framing story, multiple narrators, and flashbacks within flashbacks.

Film noirs tend to have unusually convoluted story lines, frequently involving flashbacks and other editing techniques that disrupt and sometimes obscure the narrative sequence. Framing the entire primary narrative as a flashback is also a standard device. Voiceover narration, sometimes used as a structuring device, came to be seen as a noir hallmark; while classic noir is generally associated with first-person narration (i.e., by the protagonist), Stephen Neale notes that third-person narration is common among noirs of the semidocumentary style. Neo-noirs as varied as The Element of Crime (surrealist), After Dark, My Sweet (retro), and Kiss Kiss Bang Bang (meta) have employed the flashback/voiceover combination.

Bold experiments in cinematic storytelling were sometimes attempted during the classic era: Lady in the Lake, for example, is shot entirely from the point of view of protagonist Philip Marlowe; the face of star (and director) Robert Montgomery is seen only in mirrors. The Chase (1946) takes oneirism and fatalism as the basis for its fantastical narrative system, redolent of certain horror stories, but with little precedent in the context of a putatively realistic genre. In their different ways, both Sunset Boulevard and D.O.A. are tales told by dead men. Latter-day noir has been in the forefront of structural experimentation in popular cinema, as exemplified by such films as Pulp Fiction, Fight Club, and Memento.

=== Plots, characters, and settings ===
Crime, usually murder, is an element of almost all film noirs; in addition to standard-issue greed, jealousy is frequently the criminal motivation. A crime investigation—by a private eye, a police detective (sometimes acting alone), or a concerned amateur—is the most prevalent, but far from dominant, basic plot. In other common plots the protagonists are implicated in heists or con games, or in murderous conspiracies often involving adulterous affairs. False suspicions and accusations of crime are frequent plot elements, as are betrayals and double-crosses. According to J. David Slocum, "protagonists assume the literal identities of dead men in nearly fifteen percent of all noir." Amnesia is fairly epidemic—"noir's version of the common cold", in the words of film historian Lee Server.

By the late 1940s, the noir trend was leaving its mark on other genres. A prime example is the Western Pursued (1947), filled with psychosexual tensions and behavioral explanations derived from Freudian theory.

Film noirs tend to revolve around heroes who are more flawed and morally questionable than the norm, often fall guys of one sort or another. The characteristic protagonists of noir are described by many critics as "alienated"; in the words of Silver and Ward, "filled with existential bitterness". Certain archetypal characters appear in many film noirs—hardboiled detectives, femme fatales, corrupt policemen, jealous husbands, intrepid claims adjusters, and down-and-out writers. Among characters of every stripe, cigarette smoking is rampant. From historical commentators to neo-noir pictures to pop culture ephemera, the private eye and the femme fatale have been adopted as the quintessential film noir figures, though they do not appear in most films now regarded as classic noir. Of the twenty-six National Film Registry noirs, in only four does the star play a private eye: The Maltese Falcon, The Big Sleep, Out of the Past, and Kiss Me Deadly. Just four others readily qualify as detective stories: Laura, The Killers, The Naked City, and Touch of Evil. There is usually an element of drug or alcohol use, particularly as part of the detective's method to solving the crime, as an example the character of Mike Hammer in the 1955 film Kiss Me Deadly who walks into a bar saying "Give me a double bourbon, and leave the bottle". Chaumeton and Borde have argued that film noir grew out of the "literature of drugs and alcohol".

Film noir is often associated with an urban setting, and a few cities—Los Angeles, San Francisco, New York, and Chicago, in particular—are the location of many of the classic films. In the eyes of many critics, the city is presented in noir as a "labyrinth" or "maze". Bars, lounges, nightclubs, and gambling dens are frequently the scene of action. The climaxes of a substantial number of film noirs take place in visually complex, often industrial settings, such as refineries, factories, trainyards, power plants—most famously the explosive conclusion of White Heat, set at a chemical plant. In the popular (and, frequently enough, critical) imagination, in noir it is always night and it always raining.

A substantial trend within latter-day noir—dubbed "film soleil" by critic D. K. Holm—heads in precisely the opposite direction, with tales of deception, seduction, and corruption exploiting bright, sun-baked settings, stereotypically the desert or open water, to searing effect. Significant predecessors from the classic and early post-classic eras include The Lady from Shanghai; the Robert Ryan vehicle Inferno (1953); the French adaptation of Patricia Highsmith's The Talented Mr. Ripley, Plein soleil (Purple Noon in the United States, more accurately rendered elsewhere as Blazing Sun or Full Sun; 1960); and director Don Siegel's version of The Killers (1964). The tendency was at its peak during the late 1980s and 1990s, with films such as Dead Calm (1989), After Dark, My Sweet (1990), The Hot Spot (1990), Delusion (1991), Red Rock West (1993) and the television series Miami Vice.

=== Worldview, morality, and tone ===
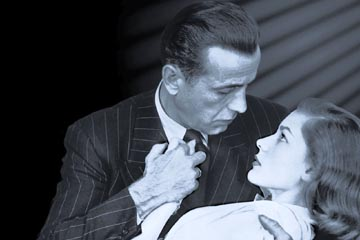
"You've got a touch of class, but I don't know how far you can go." "A lot depends on who's in the saddle." Bogart and Bacall in The Big Sleep.

Film noir is often described as essentially pessimistic. The noir stories that are regarded as most characteristic tell of people trapped in unwanted situations (which, in general, they did not cause but are responsible for exacerbating), striving against random, uncaring fate, and are frequently doomed. The films are seen as depicting a world that is inherently corrupt. Classic film noir has been associated by many critics with the American social landscape of the era—in particular, with a sense of heightened anxiety and alienation that is said to have followed World War II. In author Nicholas Christopher's opinion, "it is as if the war, and the social eruptions in its aftermath, unleashed demons that had been bottled up in the national psyche." Film noirs, especially those of the 1950s and the height of the Red Scare, are often said to reflect cultural paranoia; Kiss Me Deadly is the noir most frequently marshaled as evidence for this claim.

Film noir is often said to be defined by "moral ambiguity", yet the Production Code obliged almost all classic noirs to see that steadfast virtue was ultimately rewarded and vice, in the absence of shame and redemption, severely punished (however dramatically incredible the final rendering of mandatory justice might be). A substantial number of latter-day noirs flout such conventions: vice emerges triumphant in films as varied as the grim Chinatown and the ribald Hot Spot.

Film noir has frequently been interpreted by scholars as reflecting the psychological and social anxieties of the postwar United States, particularly in its emphasis on alienation, moral ambiguity, and disillusionment.

The tone of film noir is generally regarded as downbeat; some critics experience it as darker still—"overwhelmingly black", according to Robert Ottoson. Influential critic (and filmmaker) Paul Schrader wrote in a seminal 1972 essay that "film noir is defined by tone", a tone he seems to perceive as "hopeless". In describing the adaptation of Double Indemnity, noir analyst Foster Hirsch describes the "requisite hopeless tone" achieved by the filmmakers, which appears to characterize his view of noir as a whole. On the other hand, definitive film noirs such as The Big Sleep, The Lady from Shanghai, Scarlet Street and Double Indemnity itself are famed for their hardboiled repartee, often imbued with sexual innuendo and self-reflexive humor.

=== Music ===
The music of film noir was typically orchestral, per the Hollywood norm, but often with added dissonance. Many of the prime composers, like the directors and cameramen, were European émigrés, e.g., Max Steiner (The Big Sleep, Mildred Pierce), Miklós Rózsa (Double Indemnity, The Killers, Criss Cross), and Franz Waxman (Fury, Sunset Boulevard, Night and the City). Double Indemnity is a seminal score, initially disliked by Paramount's music director for its harshness but strongly endorsed by director Billy Wilder and studio chief Buddy DeSylva. There is a widespread popular impression that "sleazy" jazz saxophone and pizzicato bass constitute the sound of noir, but those characteristics arose much later, as in the late-1950s music of Henry Mancini for Touch of Evil and television's Peter Gunn. Bernard Herrmann's score for Taxi Driver makes heavy use of saxophone.

== See also ==
- B movie
- Crime jazz
- Film gris
- List of film noir titles
- List of neo-noir titles
- Minimalist film
- Maximalist film
- Modernist film
- Neo-noir
- Noirvember
- Postmodern film
- Pulp noir
- Scandinavian noir

== Notes ==
1. The plural forms of film noir in English include films noirs (derived from the French), films noir, and film noirs. Merriam-Webster, which acknowledges all three styles as acceptable, favors film noirs, while the Oxford English Dictionary lists only films noirs.
2. His Kind of Woman was originally directed by John Farrow, then largely reshot under Richard Fleischer after studio owner Howard Hughes demanded rewrites. Only Farrow was credited.
3. In Academic Dictionary of Arts (2005), Rakesh Chopra notes that the high-contrast film lighting schemes commonly referred to as "chiaroscuro" are more specifically representative of tenebrism, whose first great exponent was the Italian painter Caravaggio (p. 73). See also Ballinger and Graydon (2007), p. 16.

== Sources ==
- Abbas, M. Ackbar (1997). Hong Kong: Culture and the Politics of Disappearance. Minneapolis: University of Minnesota Press. ISBN 978-0-8166-2924-4
- Appel, Alfred (1974). Nabokov's Dark Cinema. Oxford and New York: Oxford University Press. ISBN 978-0-19-501834-9
- Aziz, Jamaluddin Bin (2005). "Future Noir", chap. in "Transgressing Women: Investigating Space and the Body in Contemporary Noir Thrillers". Ph.D. dissertation, Department of English and Creative Writing, Lancaster University (chapter available online).
- Ballinger, Alexander, and Danny Graydon (2007). The Rough Guide to Film Noir. London: Rough Guides. ISBN 978-1-84353-474-7
- Bernstein, Matthew (1995). "A Tale of Three Cities: The Banning of Scarlet Street", Cinema Journal 35, no. 1.
- Biesen, Sheri Chinen (2005). Blackout: World War II and the Origins of Film Noir. Baltimore: Johns Hopkins University Press. ISBN 978-0-8018-8217-3
- Borde, Raymond, and Etienne Chaumeton (2002 [1955]). A Panorama of American Film Noir, 1941–1953, trans. Paul Hammond. San Francisco: City Lights Books. ISBN 978-0-87286-412-2
- Bould, Mark (2005). Film Noir: From Berlin to Sin City. London and New York: Wallflower. ISBN 978-1-904764-50-2
- Butler, David (2002). Jazz Noir: Listening to Music from Phantom Lady to The Last Seduction. Westport, Conn.: Greenwood. ISBN 978-0-275-97301-8
- Cameron, Ian, ed. (1993). The Book of Film Noir. New York: Continuum. ISBN 978-0-8264-0589-0
- Christopher, Nicholas (1998 [1997]). Somewhere in the Night: Film Noir and the American City, 1st paperback ed. New York: Owl/Henry Holt. ISBN 978-0-8050-5699-0
- Clarens, Carlos (1980). Crime Movies: An Illustrated History. New York: W.W. Norton. ISBN 978-0-393-01262-0
- Conard, Mark T. (2007). The Philosophy of Neo-Noir. Lexington: University Press of Kentucky. ISBN 978-0-8131-2422-3
- Copjec, Joan, ed. (1993). Shades of Noir. London and New York: Verso. ISBN 978-0-86091-625-3
- Creeber, Glen (2007). The Singing Detective. London: BFI Publishing. ISBN 978-1-84457-198-7
- Dancyger, Ken, and Jeff Rush (2002). Alternative Scriptwriting: Successfully Breaking the Rules, 3d ed. Boston and Oxford: Focal Press. ISBN 978-0-240-80477-4
- Dargis, Manohla (2004). "Philosophizing Sex Dolls amid Film Noir Intrigue", The New York Times, September 17 (available online Archived 2023-09-01 at the Wayback Machine).
- Davis, Blair (2004). "Horror Meets Noir: The Evolution of Cinematic Style, 1931–1958", in Horror Film: Creating and Marketing Fear, ed. Steffen Hantke. Jackson: University Press of Mississippi. ISBN 978-1-57806-692-6
- Downs, Jacqueline (2002). "Richard Fleischer", in Contemporary North American Film Directors: A Wallflower Critical Guide, 2d ed., ed. Yoram Allon, Del Cullen, and Hannah Patterson. London and New York: Wallflower. ISBN 978-1-903364-52-9
- Durgnat, Raymond (1970). "Paint It Black: The Family Tree of the Film Noir", Cinema 6/7 (collected in Gorman et al., The Big Book of Noir, and Silver and Ursini, Film Noir Reader [1]).
- Erickson, Glenn (2004). "Fate Seeks the Loser: Edgar G. Ulmer's Detour", in Silver and Ursini, Film Noir Reader 4, pp. 25–31.
- Gorman, Ed, Lee Server, and Martin H. Greenberg, eds. (1998). The Big Book of Noir. New York: Carroll & Graf. ISBN 978-0-7867-0574-0
- Greene, Naomi (1999). Landscapes of Loss: The National Past in Postwar French Cinema. Princeton, N.J.: Princeton University Press. ISBN 978-0-691-00475-4
- Greenspun, Roger (1973). "Mike Hodges's 'Pulp' Opens; A Private Eye Parody Is Parody of Itself", The New York Times, February 9 (available online Archived 2023-09-01 at the Wayback Machine).
- Hanson, Helen (2008). Hollywood Heroines: Women in Film Noir and the Female Gothic Film. London and New York: I.B. Tauris. ISBN 978-1-84511-561-6
- Hayde, Michael J. (2001). My Name's Friday: The Unauthorized But True Story of Dragnet and the Films of Jack Webb. Nashville, Tenn.: Cumberland House. ISBN 978-1-58182-190-1
- Hirsch, Foster (1999). Detours and Lost Highways: A Map of Neo-Noir. Pompton Plains, N.J.: Limelight. ISBN 978-0-87910-288-3
- Hirsch, Foster (2001 [1981]). The Dark Side of the Screen: Film Noir. New York: Da Capo. ISBN 978-0-306-81039-8
- Holden, Stephen (1999). "Hard-Boiled as a Two-Day-Old Egg at a Two-Bit Diner", The New York Times, October 8 (available online Archived 2023-09-01 at the Wayback Machine).
- Holm, D. K. (2005). Film Soleil. Harpenden, UK: Pocket Essentials. ISBN 978-1-904048-50-3
- Hunter, Stephen (1982). "Blade Runner", in his Violent Screen: A Critic's 13 Years on the Front Lines of Movie Mayhem (1995), pp. 196–99. Baltimore: Bancroft. ISBN 978-0-9635376-4-5
- Irwin, John T. (2006). Unless the Threat of Death is Behind Them: Hard-Boiled Fiction and Film Noir. Baltimore: Johns Hopkins University Press. ISBN 978-0-8018-8435-1
- James, Nick (2002). "Back to the Brats", in Contemporary North American Film Directors, 2d ed., ed. Yoram Allon, Del Cullen, and Hannah Patterson, pp. xvi–xx. London: Wallflower. ISBN 978-1-903364-52-9
- Jones, Kristin M. (2009). "Dark Cynicism, British Style", Wall Street Journal, August 18 (available online Archived 2017-07-10 at the Wayback Machine).
- Kennedy, Harlan (1982). "Twenty-First Century Nervous Breakdown", Film Comment, July/August.
- Kirgo, Julie (1980). "Farewell, My Lovely (1975)", in Silver and Ward, Film Noir: An Encyclopedic Reference, pp. 101–2.
- Kolker, Robert (2000). A Cinema of Loneliness, 3d ed. Oxford and New York: Oxford University Press. ISBN 978-0-19-512350-0
- Krutnik, Frank, Steve Neale, and Brian Neve (2008). "Un-American" Hollywood: Politics and Film in the Blacklist Era. New Brunswick, N.J.: Rutgers University Press. ISBN 978-0-8135-4198-3
- Lynch, David, and Chris Rodley (2005). Lynch on Lynch, rev. ed. New York and London: Faber and Faber. ISBN 978-0-571-22018-2
- Lyons, Arthur (2000). Death on the Cheap: The Lost B Movies of Film Noir. New York: Da Capo. ISBN 978-0-306-80996-5
- Macek, Carl (1980). "City Streets (1931)", in Silver and Ward, Film Noir: An Encyclopedic Reference, pp. 59–60.
- Macek, Carl, and Alain Silver (1980). "House on 92nd Street (1945)", in Silver and Ward, Film Noir: An Encyclopedic Reference, pp. 134–35.
- Mackendrick, Alexander (2006). On Film-making: An Introduction to the Craft of the Director. New York: Macmillan. ISBN 978-0-571-21125-8
- Marshman, Donald (1947). "Mister 'See'-Odd-Mack'", Life, August 25.
- Martin, Richard (1997). Mean Streets and Raging Bulls: The Legacy of Film Noir in Contemporary American Cinema. Lanham, Md.: Scarecrow Press. ISBN 0-8108-3337-9
- Maslin, Janet (1996). "Deadly Plot by a Milquetoast Villain", The New York Times, March 8 (available online Archived 2012-08-08 at the Wayback Machine).
- McGilligan, Patrick (1997). Fritz Lang: The Nature of the Beast. New York and London: Faber and Faber. ISBN 978-0-571-19375-2
- Muller, Eddie (1998). Dark City: The Lost World of Film Noir. New York: St. Martin's. ISBN 978-0-312-18076-8
- Naremore, James (2008). More Than Night: Film Noir in Its Contexts, 2d ed. Berkeley, Los Angeles, and London: University of California Press. ISBN 978-0-520-25402-2
- Neale, Steve (2000). Genre and Hollywood. London and New York: Routledge. ISBN 978-0-415-02606-2
- Ottoson, Robert (1981). A Reference Guide to the American Film Noir: 1940–1958. Metuchen, N.J., and London: Scarecrow Press. ISBN 978-0-8108-1363-2
- Palmer, R. Barton (2004). "The Sociological Turn of Adaptation Studies: The Example of Film Noir", in A Companion To Literature And Film, ed. Robert Stam and Alessandra Raengo, pp. 258–77. Maiden, Mass., Oxford, and Carlton, Australia: Blackwell. ISBN 978-0-631-23053-3
- Place, Janey, and Lowell Peterson (1974). "Some Visual Motifs of Film Noir", Film Comment 10, no. 1 (collected in Silver and Ursini, Film Noir Reader [1]).
- Porfirio, Robert (1980). "Stranger on the Third Floor (1940)", in Silver and Ward, Film Noir: An Encyclopedic Reference, p. 269.
- Ray, Robert B. (1985). A Certain Tendency of the Hollywood Cinema, 1930–1980. Princeton, N.J.: Princeton University Press. ISBN 978-0-691-10174-3
- Richardson, Carl (1992). Autopsy: An Element of Realism in Film Noir. Metuchen, N.J., and London: Scarecrow Press. ISBN 978-0-8108-2496-6
- Sanders, Steven M. (2006). "Film Noir and the Meaning of Life", in The Philosophy of Film Noir, ed. Mark T. Conard, pp. 91–106. Lexington: University Press of Kentucky. ISBN 978-0-8131-9181-2
- Sarris, Andrew (1996 [1968]). The American Cinema: Directors and Directions, 1929–1968. Cambridge, Massachusetts: Da Capo. ISBN 978-0-306-80728-2
- Schatz, Thomas (1981). Hollywood Genres: Formulas, Filmmaking, and the Studio System. New York: Random House. ISBN 978-0-07-553623-9
- Schatz, Thomas (1998 [1996]). The Genius of the System: Hollywood Filmmaking in the Studio Era, new ed. London: Faber and Faber. ISBN 978-0-571-19596-1
- Schrader, Paul (1972). "Notes on Film Noir", Film Comment 8, no. 1 (collected in Silver and Ursini, Film Noir Reader [1]).
- Server, Lee (2002). Robert Mitchum: "Baby I Don't Care". New York: Macmillan. ISBN 978-0-312-28543-2
- Server, Lee (2006). Ava Gardner: "Love Is Nothing". New York: Macmillan. ISBN 978-0-312-31209-1
- Silver, Alain (1996 [1975]). "Kiss Me Deadly: Evidence of a Style", rev. versions in Silver and Ursini, Film Noir Reader [1], pp. 209–35 and Film Noir Compendium (newest with remastered frame captures, 2016), pp. 302–325.
- Silver, Alain (1996). "Introduction", in Silver and Ursini, Film Noir Reader [1], pp. 3–15, rev. ver. in Silver and Ursini, Film Noir Compendium (2016), pp. 10–25.
- Silver, Alain, and James Ursini (and Robert Porfirio—vol. 3), eds. (2004 [1996–2004]). Film Noir Reader, vols. 1–4. Pompton Plains, N.J.: Limelight.
- Silver, Alain, and Elizabeth Ward (1992). Film Noir: An Encyclopedic Reference to the American Style, 3d ed. Woodstock, N.Y.: Overlook Press. ISBN 978-0-87951-479-2 (See also: Silver, Ursini, Ward, and Porfirio [2010]. Film Noir: The Encyclopedia, 4th rev., exp. ed. Overlook. ISBN 978-1-59020-144-2)
- Slocum, J. David (2001). Violence and American Cinema. London and New York: Routledge. ISBN 978-0-415-92810-6
- Spicer, Andrew (2007). European Film Noir. Manchester, UK: Manchester University Press. ISBN 978-0-7190-6791-4
- Telotte, J. P. (1989). Voices in the Dark: The Narrative Patterns of Film Noir. Urbana and Chicago: University of Illinois Press. ISBN 978-0-252-06056-4
- Thomson, David (1998). A Biographical Dictionary of Film, 3rd ed. New York: Knopf. ISBN 978-0-679-75564-7
- Turan, Kenneth (2008). "UCLA's Pre-Code Series", Los Angeles Times, January 27 (available online ).
- Tuska, Jon (1984). Dark Cinema: American Film Noir in Cultural Perspective. Westport, Conn., and London: Greenwood. ISBN 978-0-313-23045-5
- Tyree, J. M., and Ben Walters (2007). The Big Lebowski. London: BFI Publishing. ISBN 978-1-84457-173-4
- Ursini, James (1995). "Angst at Sixty Fields per Second", in Silver and Ursini, Film Noir Reader [1], pp. 275–87.
- "Variety staff" (anon.) (1940). "Stranger on the Third Floor" [review], Variety (excerpted online).
- "Variety staff" (anon.) (1955). "Kiss Me Deadly" [review], Variety (excerpted online Archived 2018-07-07 at the Wayback Machine).
- Vernet, Marc (1993). "Film Noir on the Edge of Doom", in Copjec, Shades of Noir, pp. 1–31.
- Wager, Jans B. (2005). Dames in the Driver's Seat: Rereading Film Noir. Austin: University of Texas Press. ISBN 978-0-292-70966-9
- Walker, Michael (1992). "Robert Siodmak", in Cameron, The Book of Film Noir, pp. 110–51.
- White, Dennis L. (1980). "Beast of the City (1932)", in Silver and Ward, Film Noir: An Encyclopedic Reference, pp. 16–17.
- Widdicombe, Toby (2001). A Reader's Guide to Raymond Chandler. Westport, Conn.: Greenwood. ISBN 978-0-313-30767-6
- Williams, Linda Ruth (2005). The Erotic Thriller in Contemporary Cinema. Bloomington: Indiana University Press. ISBN 978-0-253-34713-8

== Suggested reading ==
- Auerbach, Jonathan (2011). Film Noir and American Citizenship. Durham, N.C.: Duke University Press. ISBN 978-0-8223-4993-8
- Chopra-Gant, Mike (2005). Hollywood Genres and Postwar America: Masculinity, Family and Nation in Popular Movies and Film Noir. London: IB Tauris. ISBN 978-1-85043-838-0
- Cochran, David (2000). America Noir: Underground Writers and Filmmakers of the Postwar Era. Washington, D.C.: Smithsonian Institution Press. ISBN 978-1-56098-813-7
- Dickos, Andrew (2002). Street with No Name: A History of the Classic American Film Noir. Lexington: University Press of Kentucky. ISBN 978-0-8131-2243-4
- Dimendberg, Edward (2004). Film Noir and the Spaces of Modernity. Cambridge, Massachusetts, and London: Harvard University Press. ISBN 978-0-674-01314-8
- Dixon, Wheeler Winston (2009). Film Noir and the Cinema of Paranoia. New Brunswick, N.J.: Rutgers University Press. ISBN 978-0-8135-4521-9
- García Martín, J. H. (2018). La musicalización diegética de la crisis en el cine negro holliwodiense de los años 40. La música clásica como signo del conflicto. Área abierta, 18(3), 389-407. https://doi.org/10.5209/ARAB.58492
- Grossman, Julie (2009). Rethinking the Femme Fatale in Film Noir: Ready for Her Close-Up. Basingstoke, UK: Palgrave Macmillan. ISBN 978-0-230-23328-7
- Hannsberry, Karen Burroughs (1998). Femme Noir: Bad Girls of Film. Jefferson, N.C.: McFarland. ISBN 978-0-7864-0429-2
- Hannsberry, Karen Burroughs (2003). Bad Boys: The Actors of Film Noir. Jefferson, N.C.: McFarland. ISBN 978-0-7864-1484-0
- Hare, William (2003). Early Film Noir: Greed, Lust, and Murder Hollywood Style. Jefferson, N.C.: McFarland. ISBN 978-0-7864-1629-5
- Hogan, David J. (2013). Film Noir FAQ. Milwaukee, WI: Hal Leonard. ISBN 978-1-55783-855-1
- Kaplan, E. Ann, ed. (1998). Women in Film Noir, new ed. London: British Film Institute. ISBN 978-0-85170-666-5
- Keaney, Michael F. (2003). Film Noir Guide: 745 Films of the Classic Era, 1940–1959. Jefferson, N.C.: McFarland. ISBN 978-0-7864-1547-2
- Mason, Fran (2002). American Gangster Cinema: From Little Caesar to Pulp Fiction. Houndmills, UK: Palgrave. ISBN 978-0-333-67452-9
- Mayer, Geoff, and Brian McDonnell (2007). Encyclopedia of Film Noir. Westport, Conn.: Greenwood. ISBN 978-0-313-33306-4
- McArthur, Colin (1972). Underworld U.S.A. New York: Viking. ISBN 978-0-670-01953-3
- Naremore, James (2019). Film Noir: A Very Short Introduction. Oxford: Oxford University Press. ISBN 978-0-19-879174-4
- Osteen, Mark. Nightmare Alley: Film Noir and the American Dream (Johns Hopkins University Press; 2013) 336 pages; interprets film noir as a genre that challenges the American mythology of upward mobility and self-reinvention.
- Palmer, R. Barton (1994). Hollywood's Dark Cinema: The American Film Noir. New York: Twayne. ISBN 978-0-8057-9335-2
- Palmer, R. Barton, ed. (1996). Perspectives on Film Noir. New York: G.K. Hall. ISBN 978-0-8161-1601-0
- Pappas, Charles (2005). It's a Bitter Little World: The Smartest, Toughest, Nastiest Quotes from Film Noir. Iola, Wisc.: Writer's Digest Books. ISBN 978-1-58297-387-6
- Rabinowitz, Paula (2002). Black & White & Noir: America's Pulp Modernism. New York: Columbia University Press. ISBN 978-0-231-11481-3
- Schatz, Thomas (1997). Boom and Bust: American Cinema in the 1940s. Berkeley, Los Angeles, and London: University of California Press. ISBN 978-0-684-19151-5
- Selby, Spencer (1984). Dark City: The Film Noir. Jefferson, N.C.: McFarland. ISBN 978-0-89950-103-1
- Shadoian, Jack (2003). Dreams and Dead Ends: The American Gangster Film, 2d ed. Oxford and New York: Oxford University Press. ISBN 978-0-19-514291-4
- Silver, Alain, and James Ursini (1999). The Noir Style. Woodstock, N.Y.: Overlook Press. ISBN 978-0-87951-722-9
- Silver, Alain, and James Ursini (2016). Film Noir Compendium. Milwaukee, WI: Applause. ISBN 978-1-49505-898-1
- Spicer, Andrew (2002). Film Noir. Harlow, UK: Pearson Education. ISBN 978-0-582-43712-8
- Starman, Ray (2006). TV Noir: the 20th Century. Troy, N.Y.: The Troy Bookmakers Press. ISBN 978-1-933994-22-2

== Suggested listening ==
- Murder is My Beat: Classic Film Noir Themes and Scenes (1997, Rhino Movie Music) – 18-track audio CD
- Maltese Falcons, Third Men & Touches of Evil-The Sound of Film Noir 1941–1950 (2019, Jasmine Records [UK]) – 42-track audio CD
- Film Noir: Six Classic Soundtracks (2016, Real Gone Jazz [UK]) – 57 tracks on 4 audio CDs
