= Thomas Schatz =

Thomas Schatz may refer to:

- Thomas A. Schatz, president of Citizens Against Government Waste
- Thomas Rivera Schatz (born 1966), Puerto Rican politician
- Tom Schatz, American academic
