= D. K. Holm =

Douglas Kimball Holm (born February 11, 1953) is a movie reviewer, Internet columnist, radio broadcaster, and author. Holm was born in Portland, Oregon. He attended David Douglas High School and the University of Oregon.

== Published work ==
From 1976 to 1978, Holm was the co-editor and contributor to Cinemonkey film magazine (the magazine continues on in the form of a website by the same name). From 1985 to 1995, Holm was a film reviewer for the alternative weekly Willamette Week and from 1995 to 1998, film editor for the biweekly PDXS newspaper; both in Portland, Oregon. Holm is currently a columnist for Kevin Smith's website QuickStopEntertainment and film editor for the newspaper The Vancouver Voice (of Vancouver, Washington). Holm also regularly contributes to the paper's blog. Holm is additionally a co-host of the semi-weekly movie review radio program "On The Aisle" on KQAC. Holm has also appeared in a video performance piece by Miranda July called The Swan Tool, and as a cameo in James Westby's movie, Film Geek.

=== Books ===
As of 2006, Holm has authored five books. Robert Crumb (Pocket Essentials, 2003, revised edition 2005, ISBN 978-1-904048-51-0) is the first book-length critical study of the underground cartoonist published in English. R. Crumb: Conversations (University Press of Mississippi, 2004, ISBN 978-1-57806-637-7) is an anthology of previously published interviews with Crumb spanning the cartoonist's career. Quentin Tarantino (Pocket Essentials, 2005, ISBN 978-1-904048-36-7) is a critical study of the film director's work. Kill Bill: An Unofficial Casebook (Glitter Books, 2005, ISBN 978-1-902588-12-4) is a time-coded annotation to Tarantino's film, and also includes an anthology of contemporary reviews. Film Soleil (Pocket Essentials, 2006, ISBN 978-1-904048-50-3) is a critical study of an aspect of film noir, also known as neo-noir. The two books on Tarantino have an on-line corrections blog.

== Personal life ==
In 2008, Holm was diagnosed with esophageal cancer. A benefit was held at a local Portland theatre featuring a silent auction, readings of his more memorable reviews, and a musical appearance by (among others) Pink Martini's Thomas Lauderdale, in April 2008.
