= Portrayal of women in film noir =

The depictions of women in film noir come in a range of archetypes and stock characters, including the femme fatale. A femme fatale (/ˌfæm fəˈtɑːl/ or /ˌfɛm fəˈtɑːl/; French: [fam fatal]), translated to "lethal woman", is a prevalent and indicative theme among the film noir style.

The portrayal of women in film noir, and more specifically the term “femme fatale”, has been a topic of intrigue and fascination for decades. The subgenre of film has captivated audiences with its dark and enigmatic depiction of women, often casting them as seductive, cunning, and morally ambiguous characters. She is typically characterized by her intelligence and wit, making her an intriguing figure in cinema. The official term, “femme fatale”, is French for “fatal woman,” signifying the perilous nature of her character.

== Background ==
Before the outbreak of World War II, women were predominantly fulfilling the role of housewives, with a large majority of them not engaging in employment outside the household. Those who did choose to land roles in the workforce were typically secretaries, receptionists, or department store clerks, as other roles were traditionally deemed unsuitable for women. However, when the United States entered World War II and the male workforce depleted due to military involvement, the demand for female labor escalated dramatically. Women now had to fill the void left by the men in civilian jobs, shifting the cultural dynamic from its traditional role. This change also brought about a transformation in the ways that women were portrayed in popular culture, with directors often choosing to highlight more themes of female liberation and independence.

Despite the initial expectation that the employment of women would be a temporary measure during the war, with women eventually returning to their domestic roles once the global conflict concluded, many female workers strongly resisted this notion. Many were unwilling to go back to their prior role and give up the independence and empowerment that they had gained. Returning soldiers were worried that the women they left on the home-front would not look or act the same and that they may feel different about their positions in society after years of separate lives. They also were worried that these women would not give up their jobs. Consequently, when they did return to their homes, these feelings of isolation grew, leaving a mark on the depiction of female characters in American cinema.

Film noir began to highlight this shift in many of its female roles. These roles often represented stylistic adaptations of the power behind patriarchy. They also began to emphasize negative images of resourceful working women. For instance, Cora Smith, in The Postman Always Rings Twice, works at her husband's diner, where she is bored and longs to “be somebody.” This desire evolves into a murder plot that will allow her to start a new life with her drafter boyfriend and inherit the diner for herself, meaning she is literally seeking to kill a man for his job.

Historically, the returning veteran who had “sacrificed” for his country in a strict military system assumed that he would again wield economic authority and take command of the family home front. This militarization of male circumstances and attitudes further increased the defensive stance against women in the paid workforce, particularly if they demonstrated economic independence.

The main archetypes of female roles in film noir can be divided into two categories: the girl-next-door and the femme fatale.

== The girl-next-door ==
Her character archetype is depicted as ordinary, often overshadowed by the femme fatale. She is known to be genuinely honest, innocent, and sweet. Similarly to the character of Fanny Price in Jane Austen's Mansfield Park, the girl next door tends to embrace authenticity and traditional standards of either Christian morality or whichever other unwritten social rules governs how to behave. The girl-next-door often does refer to the fact she lives right next door to the male protagonist, possibly having known him for their entire lives.

Her character represents the quiet and constant love that has always been there, unseen and unnoticed by the male protagonist. Similarly to Fanny Price, the girl next door is often overlooked as a love interest. It is usually only after the male protagonist has gone through a series of soul crushing experiences with the femme fatale, similarly to Edmund Bertram's many heartbreaks over Mary Crawford, that he realizes that the girl-next-door, like Fanny Price, has been there all along, hoping for the male protagonist to finally notice and choose her. An example of this is in Cathy O’Donnell’s portrayal of Keechie in They Live by Night (Ray, 1948).

== The femme fatale ==
The femme fatale is often depicted as a seductive woman who woos the male protagonist into a dangerous trap for her own benefit. While depictions vary, she is most typically used as a nemesis and, or attractor in stories and cinema. Often serving as catalysts for criminal behavior in men, they encouraged the blame heaped on women's sexuality and furthered the calls for her sexual repression and restriction to the household. These figures use their sexuality as a means to an end. Ideologically, the fatal femme both threatens and is used to reaffirm American culture's highest mythic authority. This authority follows the sanctity of the male-dominant household and in many ways, the political economy of patriarchal capitalism. Her sexuality thus personalizes, intensifies, and moralizes these classic narratives, often contradicting the primary dominant culture. Femme fatale in the contemporary world is still often described as having a power related to a seductress, gaining power of men and using her charm to fulfill her desires.

=== Tactics ===
A main tactic of the femme fatale is to use manipulation, often involving her feminity and sexual traits, as a way to achieve some hidden agenda.

The femme fatale is a prevalent and indicating theme to the style of film noir. The archetype of the femme fatale often pushes back on the male protagonist, posing as the obstacle to the protagonist in reaching their goals. In understanding dramatic structure, the dramatic action reveals the deep desires and goals of the characters who move the plot ahead. Therefore, the objectives and obstacles create complications and unraveling, the femme fatale is the epitome of complication and unraveling. A characteristic of the femme fatale is she often uses her sexuality, beauty, and con artist tendencies in order to get what she wants, only to discard her conquests once they are no longer useful.

Some of the most notorious femmes fatales in classical film noir are Barbara Stanwyck as Phyllis Dietrichson in Double Indemnity (Wilder, 1944), Rita Hayworth in Gilda (1946), and Lana Turner in The Postman Always Rings Twice (1946).

== History ==
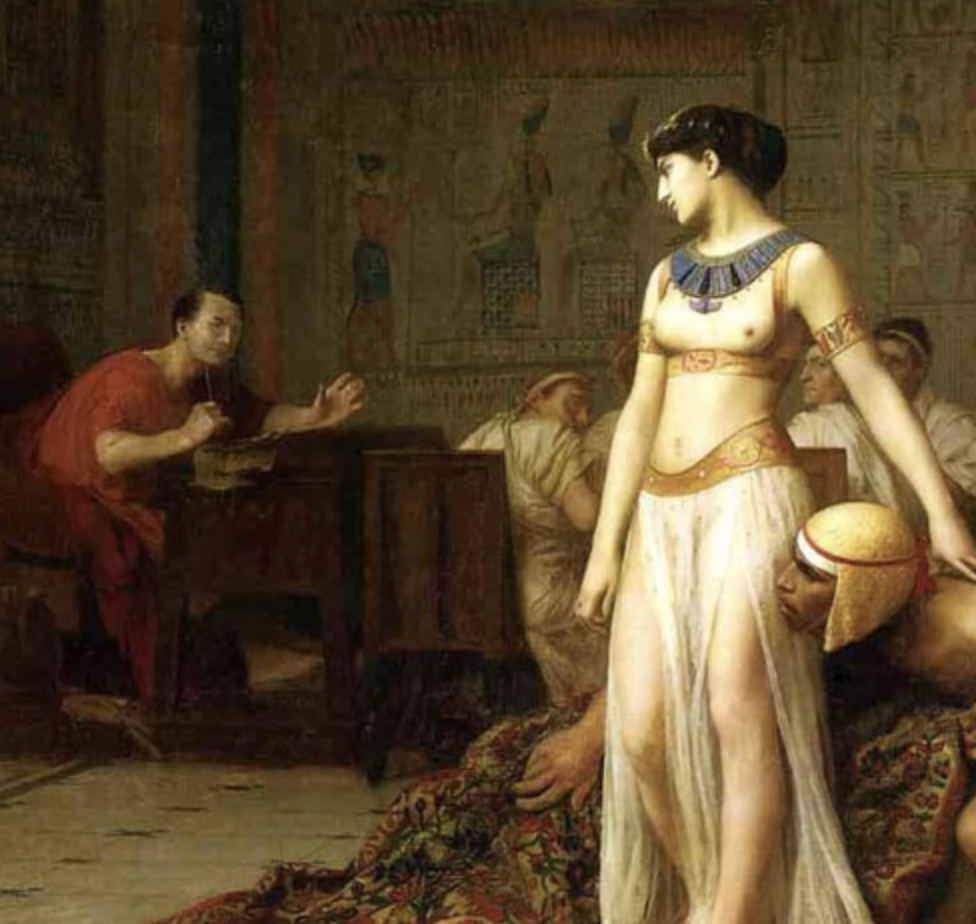
Cleopatra's protection and restoration of her throne. From the painting Cleopatra and Caesar (1866) by Jean-Léon Gérôme

=== Myths and legends of femme fatale ===
The archetype femme fatale has historically been a culturally pervasive influence on literature and art. Femme fatale has roots in mythology and legends through figures such as Eve from the Biblical creation narrative and the original sin story of Adam and Eve; mythological figures such as Circe and Clytemnestra; folklore, in figures like succubi and yuki-onna; and even history, in an understanding of figures like Cleopatra, Lucrezia Borgia, and Mata Hari. In these representations, the femme fatale possesses an allure that is able to enchant and hypnotize her victim, sometimes even through a metaphysical or supernatural force; akin to a witch, seductress, or enchantress. Similarly to males with dark triad personality disorders, what seems to motivate the femme fatale is an insatiable desire for power and control, often over men, weaponizing her charm and beauty while using lies, deception, and coercion.

== Cultural context ==
=== World War II ===
Though World War II is not often present in the plot lines of film noir, scholars suggest that the war period is important to the configuration of gender identity and gendered hierarchies in American society. During wartime, women entered what previously were male-dominated job positions, earning higher wages than ever before. Postwar retrenchment intended to restore jobs back to men and shift women to lower-paid positions or domestic roles. Sylvia Harvey examined these social shifts in regards to film noir and writes, "These economic changes forced certain changes in the traditional organization of the family; and the underlying sense of horror and uncertainty in film noir may be seen, in part, as an indirect response to this forcible assault on traditional family structures and the traditional and conservative values which they embodied."

World War II marked a significant turning point in the feminist movement as societal gender roles were becoming more closely examined. This wave that swept over 1940s cinema led to the exploration of how women function in film, a movement that critics and scholars could both agree pushed the expected boundaries of female characters.

=== Patriarchy ===
Patriarchy is another social system being examined in film noir. Malu Barroso, author at High On Films writes, "As the patriarchal social order tried to reinstate itself when the war was over. Within the stylistic norms of the noir genre, the rough lighting and the gloomy visual clues of danger reflects the unsettling, broken domestic order, highlighting to the audience the tension in the home and the women's role in triggering the narrative." Female characters in film noir represent a disturbance to male protagonists and the heteronormative patriarchal order, one that loses its control over women and the female character gains her own power.

Postwar film noir of the 1940s is believed to be a direct reflection of the dark reality of a postwar culture and the reality of the re-oppressed woman. Financial independence and freedom through the workforce was being taken back by the patriarchal system.

== Feminist theory and criticism ==
Film noir is understood as not a genre but an adaptable film style. As film scholar Raymond Durgnat points out, film noir is a point in film history, not a genre. Influenced by German Expressionism film, Hollywood took the aesthetics of forties and fifties, as dark, urban landscapes, fused with crime and mystery. How the women were portrayed in film noir helped to fuel the narrative with plot twists and deception.

Much feminist interest comes from understanding how the female form is being used and what that represents. Feminist theory within the context of film noir often seeks to understand themes such as gender identity, sexuality, in relation to representation and power. Theorists and scholars explore both the problematic and beneficial implications to portrayals of women in film noir.

Janey Place writes in Women in Film Noir that “film noir is a male fantasy, as is most of our art.” She explains that noir's female villains are central to the frame in the stylistic choices of the genre. She goes on to write that it is, “one of the few periods of film in which women are active, not static symbols, are intelligent and powerful, if destructively so, and derive power, not weakness, from their sexuality.”

Mary Ann Doane writes, “She is not the subject of feminism but a symptom of male fears about feminism. Nevertheless, the representation – like any representation –is not totally under the control of its producers and, once disseminated, comes to take on a life of its own.”

Kate Stables writes that “the postmodern fatal woman is a creature of excess and spectacle, like the films she decorates.”

== Parody ==
- The 1941 screwball comedy film Ball of Fire, was also poking fun at the already established cliches of film noir and of the femme fatale. The main source of the comedy, however, was in the film's intellectual, completely isolated, and socially clueless professor of linguistics, played by Gary Cooper, whose character arc leads to him overcoming his lack of confidence and gaining a healthy sense of both assertiveness and traditional masculinity. The film also provides a redemption arc for its seemingly cliched femme fatale, played by Barbara Stanwyck.
- The 1994 film The Mask, starring Jim Carrey, is also a parody of the film noir genre. Furthermore, the usual two female roles are subverted; Cameron Diaz's seeming femme fatale character is not only given a redemption arc, but the seeming girl next door character, played by Amy Yasbeck, turns out to be a façade concealing a very greedy and sociopathic person.

== Femme Fatale in the James Bond Franchise ==
The James Bond series based on the iconic character created by Ian Fleming, has been a cornerstone of the spy thriller genre since the release of the first film, “Dr. No”, in 1962. Central to the allure and success of these films has been the inclusion of strong, complex, and sometimes morally ambiguous female characters, often embodied as femme fatales. These enigmatic and seductive female figures have played integral roles in the espionage world of James Bond, adding depth, intrigue, and a distinctive dynamic to the films.

== Notable Femme Fatales in the James Bond Universe ==
- Pussy Galore (Honor Blackman) in Goldfinger (1964): as a pilot and member of the titular villain's organization, Galore is both a challenge and an ally to Bond. While she in an aid to the evil villain Goldfinger while attempting to seduce Bond, Bond eventually turns the tables and seduces her, reflecting not only toxic masculinity, but the dominance of men over their female counterparts. - Vesper Lynd (Eva Green) in Casino Royale (2006): Vesper combines the elements of a femme fatale with a more complex character arc, contributing to Bond's emotional depth. Her character is complex in comparison to other Bond girls as she manipulates Bond to trust her, yet ends up betraying him as well as saving his life in the process. - Miranda Frost (Rosamund Pike) in Die Another Day (2002): As a double agent who uses her talents on behalf of the villain, Gustav Graves, Frost showcases her femme fatale characteristics through her sexuality. Femme fatales speak to men's fear of weakness in the face of desire. Bond succumbs to her seductive charms and in turn, is betrayed.

The inclusion of femme fatale characters in the James Bond universe has been noted as playing a role in shaping the franchise's cinematic identity and its lasting impact on the film industry. These complex characters can provide a stark contrast to traditional female stereotypes in cinema, offering multi-dimensional, empowered women who challenge and engage with the male lead through their seductive charms.

== Notable films ==
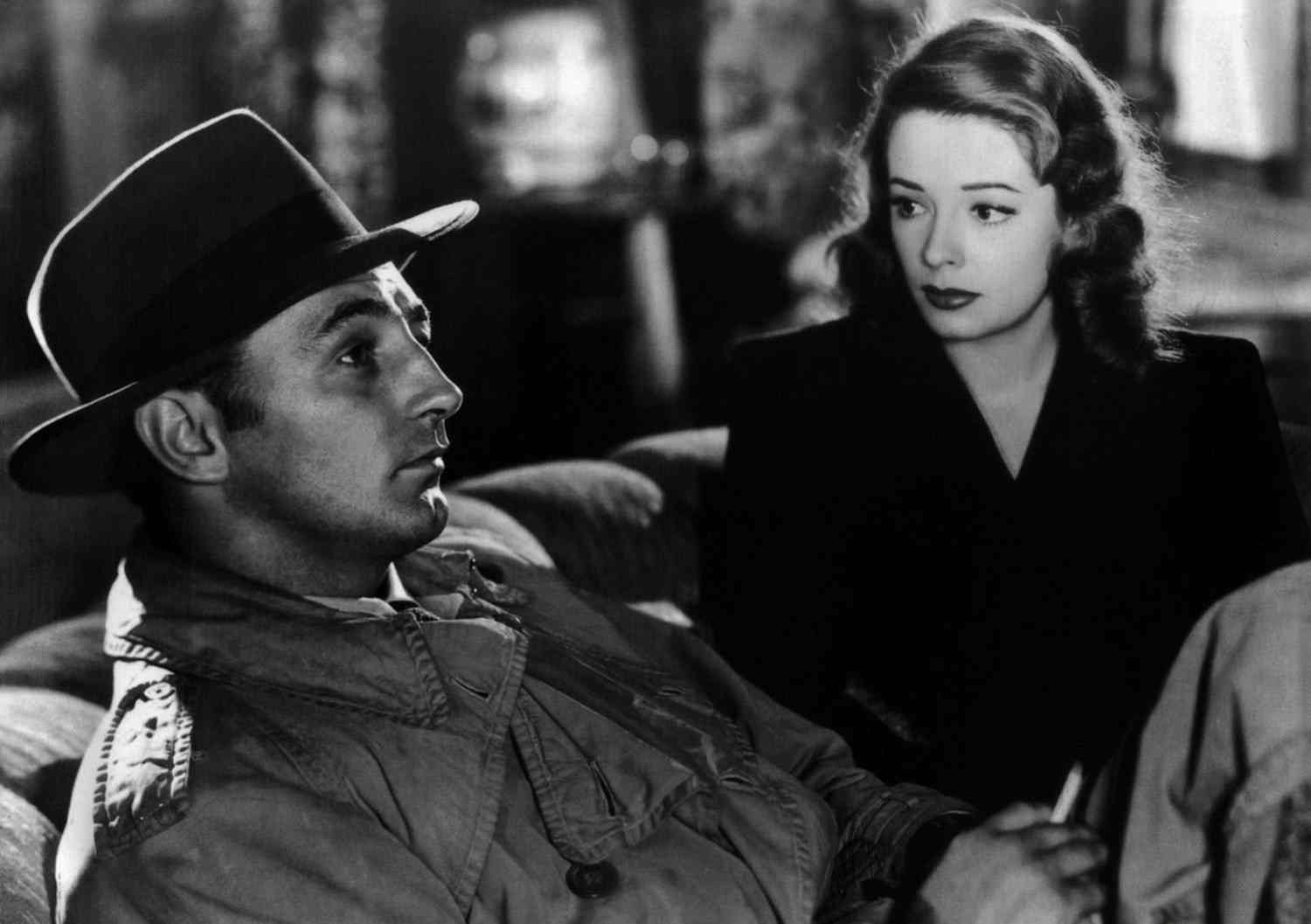
Femme fatale Kathie Moffat, in Out of the Past, played by Jane Greer

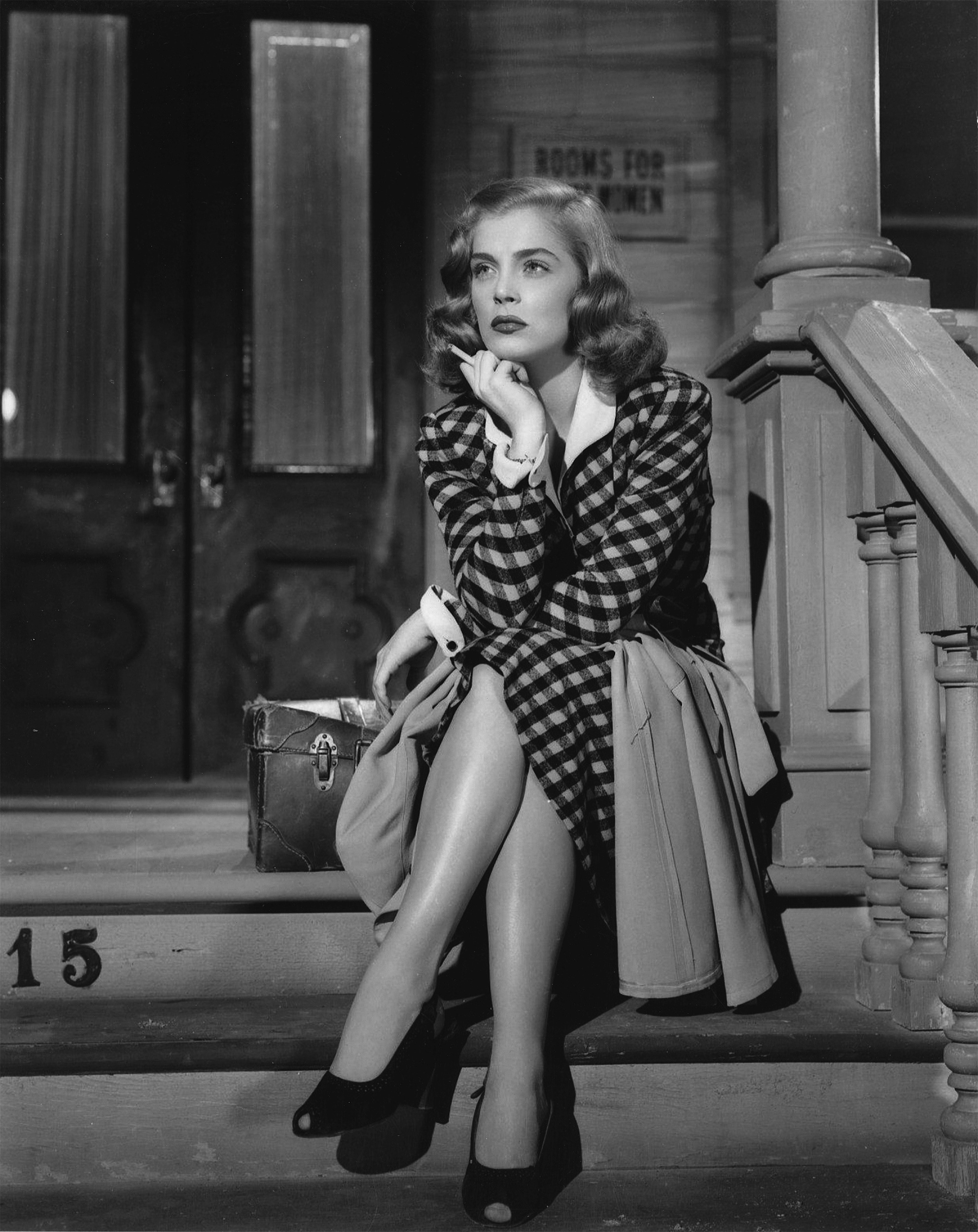
Lizabeth Scott, pictured in a publicity still for The Strange Love of Martha Ivers, appeared in several film noirs of the classical era

=== Films of the 1940s-1950s ===
- Double Indemnity (features the archetypal femme fatale Phyllis Dietrichson, played by Barbara Stanwyck)
- Murder My Sweet (Edward Dmytryk, 1944)
- Laura, (1944)
- Mildred Pierce
- The Maltese Falcon
- Scarlet Street
- Kiss Me Deadly
- Detour (Edgar G Ulmer, 1945)
- Gilda (1946)
- The Postman Always Rings Twice (1946)
- The Lady from Shanghai (1947)
- Out of the Past
- The Killers (the first breakthrough role for Ava Gardner)
- Too Late for Tears
- Gun Crazy

=== Neo-Film Noir 1970s-contemporary ===
- Klute (1971)
- Across 110th Street (1972)
- Chinatown (1974)
- Taxi Driver (1976)
- Body Heat (1981)
- Fatal Attraction (1987)
- Basic Instinct (1992)
- Wild Things (1998)
- Brick (2005)
- Gone Girl (2014)
- Atomic Blonde (2017)
- Red Sparrow (2018)
- Ocean's Eight (2018)
- Hustlers (2019)
