= Noirvember =

Global holiday on the film noir genre

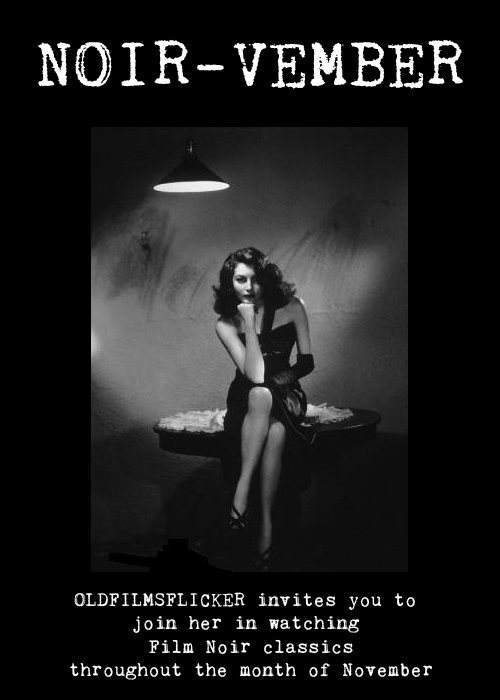
Original Noirvember graphic from its inception in 2010.

Noirvember is a global month-long holiday celebrated in November by cinephiles focusing on the film noir genre. The holiday was created in 2010 by film writer Marya E. Gates as a month-long challenge to get more knowledgeable about the genre. It first gained popularity on Tumblr before the hashtag became popular on Twitter.

== History ==
Over the years, many libraries, video rental stores, and art house movie theaters began centering their programming around film noir and crime fiction in the month of November. Several streaming platforms like Tubi, Kanopy, and Criterion Channel offer film noir programming in November for movie fans who participate in the viewing celebration. Kino Lorber holds a yearly Noirvember sale on all their film noir titles every November. In 2016 and 2017, the blog for popular screenwriting website The Black List hosted a series of articles for Noirvember focusing on classic film noir written by prominent screenwriters and filmmakers such as Amber Tamblyn, Josh Olson, Richard Kelly, Anna Biller, Max Minghella, and Kirsten "Kiwi" Smith.

== Legacy ==
In 2024, in honor of the holiday's 15th anniversary, the Criterion Channel featured an entire collection dedicated to Noirvember essentials. In the United Kingdom, film critic Christina Newland curated "Under the Mink: Film Noir at Columbia Pictures" for distributor Park Circus. The season of screenings added a Noirvember twist to the distributor's yearlong celebration of Columbia Picture's 100th anniversary. Similar programming appeared at The Brattle and Coolidge Corner movie theaters in Boston, the Chiswick Cinema in London, the Nuart in Los Angeles, the Jacob Burns Film Center, and other participating venues globally. It has been credited by Eddie Muller, film historian and host of TCM's Noir Alley, as helping continue the legacy of the genre and making it accessible to new generations of movie lovers.
