= Night-for-night =

In cinematography, night-for-night filming is the practice of actually filming night scenes at night.

In the early days of cinema, before the invention of the proper lighting systems, night scenes were filmed "day-for-night"—that is, they were filmed during the day, and the film was "corrected", either with a polarized lens on the movie camera, or via a variety of post-production techniques. Day-for-night shooting is still used in low-budget films.

The American television producer Quinn Martin was known for heavily utilizing night-for-night filming.
