= Tom Schatz (professor) =

Tom Schatz is Professor Emeritus in the Department of Radio-Television-Film at the University of Texas at Austin.

== Books ==
- Hollywood Genres: Formulas, Filmmaking, and the Studio System (McGraw-Hill, 1981)
- The Genius of the System: Hollywood Filmmaking in the Studio Era (University of Minnesota Press, 2010)
- Boom and Bust: American Cinema in the 1940s (Charles Scribners & Sons, 1997)
- Hollywood: Critical Concepts (editor)
