= Andy (song) =

Single by Rita Mitsouko

from the album The No Comprendo
- Language: French
- Released: June 1986
- Genre: Pop; funk, New Wave
- Length: 5:22
- Label: Virgin France
- Songwriters: Fred Chichin; Catherine Ringer
- Producers: Tony Visconti; Catherine Ringer; Fred Chichin

Rita Mitsouko singles chronology
| "Marcia Baila" (1985) | "Andy" (1986) | "C'est comme ça" (1986) |

Music video
- "Andy" on YouTube

"Andy" is a song by the French pop rock group Rita Mitsouko. It was released in summer 1986 as the lead single (with "Un jour, un chien" on the B-side) from their second studio album The No Comprendo (that would appear in September).

This song was played at 2024 Paris Olympics opening Ceremony

== Writing and composition ==
The song was written by Fred Chichin and Catherine Ringer.

== Music video ==
A promotional music video was produced for the song, directed by French filmmaker Philippe Gautier. The clip features the duo performing "Andy" in a studio setting with stylized costumes, choreographed movements and surreal visual effects that reflect the band's theatrical and eclectic image.

== Track listings ==
7" single "Andy / Un soir, un chien" Virgin 108 284 (1986, Europe)

A. "Andy" – 4:15
B. "Un soir, un chien" – 4:35

12" maxi single Virgin 80253 (1986, France)

A. "Andy" – 5:15
B1. "Un soir, un chien" – 5:45
B2. "Bad Days" – 4:55

12" maxi single Virgin 608 701 (1986, Europe)

A. "Andy (Extended English Version)" – 5:15
B. "Andy (French Version)" – 5:15

12" maxi single Virgin SA 3109 (1987, France)

A. "Andy (Jesse Johnson Remix)" – 7:35
B. "Un soir, un chien (12" Version)" – 5:36

=== Remixes ===
- Album version – 5:15
- 7" version/French Version – 4:15
- Video Version – 5:55
- English version – 4:15
- Extended English Version – 5:15
- English Version – 5:55 (from The No Comprendo CD)

Remixed by Jesse Johnson and Keith Cohen

- Jesse Johnson Remix 7" Version – 3:21
- Jesse Johnson Remix 12" Version – 7:35
- Bassapella – 6:02
- Dub – 6:00
- Instrumental – 5:58
- Shoo Version – 6:05

Remixed by Fred Chichin (Fat Freddy) (1990)

- Andy Live – 6:53 (from Re)

Remixed by Folamour (2019)

- Folamour's Italo Remix – 5:38

== Charts ==
| Chart (1986) | Peak position |
|---|---|
| France (SNEP) | 19 |

=== "Andy (Remix)" ===
| Chart (1987–1988) | Peak position |
|---|---|
| Quebec (ADISQ) | 10 |
| US Dance Club Songs (Billboard) | 11 |
