= Nuit d'ivresse =

Nuit d'ivresse may refer to:

- Nuit d'ivresse (Berlioz), a duet from the opera Les Troyens by Hector Berlioz
- Nuit d'ivresse (film), a film based on the play of the same name
- Nuit d'ivresse (play), a play by Josiane Balasko and Michel Blanc
- "Nuit d'ivresse", a song on Les Rita Mitsouko's album Re by Fat Freddy
- "Nuit d'ivresse", a song on the album The No Comprendo
