= Isabelle Sadoyan =

French-Armenian actress

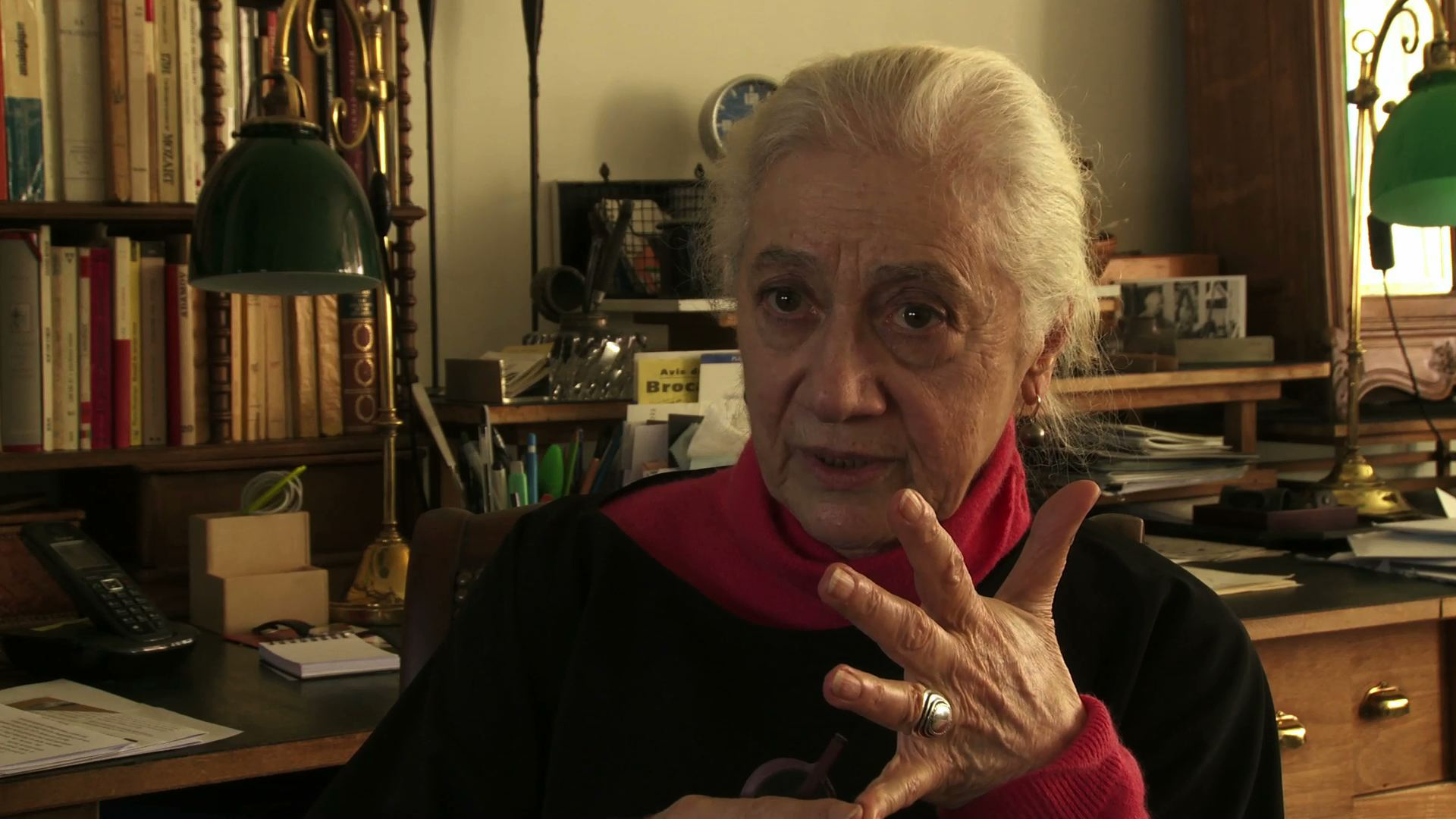
- Sadouan in 2015
- Born: 12 May 1928; Lyon, France
- Died: 10 July 2017 (aged 89); Saint-Didier-au-Mont-d'Or, France
- Occupation: Actress
- Years active: 1950–2017
- Spouse: Jean Bouise

Isabelle Sadoyan (12 May 1928 – 10 July 2017) was a French-Armenian actress.

== Career ==
She made her theater debut in 1950 with the play Bottines et collets montés, based on plays written by Eugène Labiche and Georges Courteline, directed by Roger Planchon. She'll work mostly with Planchon during the 50s.

She received two nominations for the Molière Award for Best Supporting Actress : in 2010 for Les Fausses Confidences and in 2014 for L'Origine du monde. She won the second time.

Her filmography includes films by Jeanne Moreau, Claude Chabrol, Claude Lelouch, Luc Besson, Jean-Luc Godard, Henri Verneuil, Bertrand Tavernier, Robert Kechichian and Krzysztof Kieślowski.

== Personal life ==
She was married to actor Jean Bouise until his death in 1989.

== Theater ==
Year	Title	Author	Director
1950	Faust Hamlet	Thomas Kyd & Christopher Marlowe	Roger Planchon
1950-51	Bottines et collets montés	Eugène Labiche & Georges Courteline	Roger Planchon
1951	Twelfth Night	William Shakespeare	Roger Planchon
1952	Claire	René Char	Roger Planchon
1952	Life Is a Dream	Pedro Calderón de la Barca	Roger Planchon
1953	Liliom	Ferenc Molnár	Roger Planchon
1953	Le Sens de la Marche	Arthur Adamov	Roger Planchon
1953	La Balade du grand macabre	Michel de Ghelderode	Roger Planchon
1953	Les Aventures de Rocambole	Lucien Dabril	Roger Planchon
1953-54	Le Professeur Taranne	Arthur Adamov	Roger Planchon
1954	Edward II	Christopher Marlowe	Roger Planchon
1954	The Broken Jug	Heinrich von Kleist	Roger Planchon
1955	Victor ou les Enfants au pouvoir	Roger Vitrac	Roger Planchon
1955	Amédée, or How to Get Rid of It	Eugène Ionesco	Roger Planchon
1956	Aujourd’hui ou les Coréens	Michel Vinaver	Roger Planchon
1957-58	Paolo Paoli	Arthur Adamov	Roger Planchon
1958	The Good Person of Szechwan	Bertolt Brecht	Roger Planchon
1958	George Dandin ou le Mari confondu	Molière	Roger Planchon
1959-60	La Seconde Surprise de l’amour	Pierre de Marivaux	Roger Planchon
1959-63	The Three Musketeers	Alexandre Dumas	Roger Planchon
1960	Dead Souls	Nikolai Gogol	Roger Planchon
1961	Edward II	Christopher Marlowe	Roger Planchon
1961-62	Schweik in the Second World War	Bertolt Brecht	Roger Planchon
1962	La Remise	Roger Planchon	Roger Planchon
1962	La Vie imaginaire de l’éboueur Auguste Geai	Armand Gatti	Jacques Rosner
1962-64	Tartuffe	Molière	Roger Planchon
1963	O m’man Chicago...	Roger Planchon	Roger Planchon
1964	Troilus and Cressida	William Shakespeare	Roger Planchon
1964	Schweik in the Second World War	Bertolt Brecht	Roger Planchon
1964	La Vie imaginaire de l’éboueur Auguste Geai	Armand Gatti	Jacques Rosner
1965	Patte blanche	Roger Planchon	Jacques Rosner
1967	Bleus, blancs, rouges ou les Libertins	Roger Planchon	Roger Planchon
1968	Le Coup de Trafalgar	Roger Vitrac	Jacques Rosner
1968-69	George Dandin ou le Mari confondu	Molière	Roger Planchon
1969-70	La mise en pièces	Pierre Corneille	Roger Planchon
1971	Bleus, blancs, rouges ou les Libertins	Roger Planchon	Roger Planchon
1972	La Langue au chat	Roger Planchon	Roger Planchon
1972	The Massacre at Paris	Christopher Marlowe	Patrice Chéreau
1973-74	Toller	Tankred Dorst	Patrice Chéreau
1973-74	Le cochon noir	Roger Planchon	Roger Planchon
1973-74	Par-dessus bord	Michel Vinaver	Roger Planchon
1973-79	Tartuffe	Molière	Roger Planchon
1974	Folies bourgeoises	Roger Planchon	Roger Planchon
1975-76	A.A., Théâtres d’Arthur Adamov	Arthur Adamov	Roger Planchon
1976	Folies bourgeoises	Roger Planchon	Roger Planchon
1978	Pericles, Prince of Tyre	William Shakespeare	Roger Planchon
1979	Les Fausses Confidences	Pierre de Marivaux	Jacques Lassalle
1980	À cinquante ans elle découvrait la mer	Denise Chalem	Gabriel Garran
1981-82	Last Summer in Tchulimsk	Alexander Vampilov	Simone Amouyal
1984-85	À cinquante ans elle découvrait la mer	Denise Chalem	Gabriel Garran
1988-89	Tir & Lir	Marie Redonnet	Alain Françon
1990	Le Chant du départ	Ivane Daoudi	Jean-Pierre Vincent
1992	État des lieux	Jean-Yves Picq	Jean-Yves Picq
1992	Women in a River Landscape	Heinrich Böll	Jacques Rosner
1993	The Pelican	August Strindberg	Alain Milianti
1994	État des lieux	Jean-Yves Picq	Jean-Yves Picq
1995	Ariane et Barbe bleue	Maurice Maeterlinck	Jacques Bioulès
1996	Slavs!	Tony Kushner	Jorge Lavelli
1996	Prometheus Bound	Aeschylus	Michel Raskine
1997	The Time of the Doves	Mercè Rodoreda	Kristian Frédric
1997-98	Le Bonnet du fou	Luigi Pirandello	Laurent Terzieff
1998	Savannah Bay	Marguerite Duras	Catherine Sermet
1999	Nicodème	Bruno Bayen	Bruno Bayen
1999-2002	Trois femmes	Catherine Anne	Catherine Anne
2001	Gouaches	Jacques Serena	Joël Jouanneau
2002	Uncle Vanya	Anton Chekhov	Charles Tordjman
2005-06	The Father	August Strindberg	Christian Schiaretti
2007	The Giants of the Mountain	Luigi Pirandello	Laurent Laffargue
2007-11	Conversations with Mother	Santiago Carlos Oves	Didier Bezace
2008	Par-dessus bord	Michel Vinaver	Christian Schiaretti
2010	Les Fausses Confidences	Pierre de Marivaux	Didier Bezace
2011	Endgame	Samuel Beckett	Alain Françon
2011-12	Ruy Blas	Victor Hugo	Christian Schiaretti
2012	Uncle Vanya	Anton Chekhov	Christian Benedetti
2013	Endgame	Samuel Beckett	Alain Françon
2013	L’Origine du monde	Sébastien Thiéry	Jean-Michel Ribes
2013-14	Three Sisters	Anton Chekhov	Christian Benedetti
2015	L’Origine du monde	Sébastien Thiéry	Jean-Michel Ribes
2015-16	Le Retour au désert	Bernard-Marie Koltès	Arnaud Meunier
2016-17	Avant de s’envoler	Florian Zeller	Ladislas Chollat
2017	In the Shadow of the Glen	John Millington Synge	Clara Simpson

== Filmography ==
=== Cinema ===
Year	Title	Role	Director	Notes
1970	The Things of Life	Nurse	Claude Sautet	
1970	The Wedding Ring	Hélène	Christian de Chalonge	
1972	Les camisards	Madame Villeneuve	René Allio	
1976	Monsieur Klein	consultation woman	Joseph Losey	
1977	That Obscure Object of Desire	Jadiner	Luis Buñuel	
1979	The Adolescent	Louise	Jeanne Moreau	
1980	The Lady Banker	Sister Hermance	Francis Girod	
1981	L'homme fragile	Luguette	Claire Clouzot	
1982	The Passerby		Jacques Rouffio	
1982	The Hatter's Ghost	Alice Kachoudas	Claude Chabrol	
1982	The Return of Martin Guerre	Catherine Boëre	Daniel Vigne	
1983	Itinéraire bis	Madame Panoux	Christian Drillaud	
1983	La bête noire	Madame Guyot	Patrick Chaput	
1984	L'air du crime	Yvette	Alain Klarer	
1985	Subway	prefect's wife	Luc Besson	
1985	Partir, revenir	Anna	Claude Lelouch	
1985	Tristesse et beauté	Mathilde	Joy Fleury	
1985	Sans odeur		Yann Legargeant	Short
1986	Flagrant désir	Angelina	Claude Faraldo	
1986	A Man and a Woman: 20 Years Later	baker	Claude Lelouch	
1987	Châteauroux district	Manou	Philippe Charigot	
1987	Keep Your Right Up	grandmother	Jean-Luc Godard	
1989	Embrasse-moi	Gaby	Michèle Rosier	
1989	Après la guerre	La Crochue	Jean-Loup Hubert	
1991	Mayrig	Anna	Henri Verneuil	
1991	In the Eye of the Snake	grandmother	Max Reid	
1992	588 rue paradis	Anna	Henri Verneuil	
1993	Three Colours: Blue	servant	Krzysztof Kieślowski	
1994	Carences	Madame Martin	David Rozenberg	
1995	The Bait	Eric's grandmother	Bertrand Tavernier	
1995	Le petit garçon	Cécile	Pierre Granier-Deferre	
1995	Les Misérables	Madame Magloire	Claude Lelouch	
1995	Péché véniel... péché mortel...	Grandma Lola	Pomme Meffre	
1996	The Eighth Day	Georges' Mother	Jaco Van Dormael	
1997	La Sicilia	fortune teller	Luc Pien	
1999	The Children of the Marshland		Jean Becker	
2001	Origine contrôlée	Aunt	Ahmed Bouchaala & Zakia Tahri	
2002	Aram	Aunt Anouche	Robert Kechichian	
2006	Le passager de l'été	Prudence	Florence Moncorgé-Gabin	
2008	Didine	Roberte	Vincent Dietschy	
2008	Summer Hours	Éloïse	Olivier Assayas	
2008	Les murs porteurs	Madame Mouchet	Cyril Gelblat	
2010	Des filles en noir	Sonia	Jean-Paul Civeyrac	
2011	Un baiser papillon	hairdresser client	Karine Silla	
2012	Thérèse Desqueyroux	Aunt Clara	Claude Miller	
2013	Vandal	Grandma	Hélier Cisterne	
2015	Heat Wave	Odette	Raphaël Jacoulot	
2016	Irreplaceable	Werner's mother	Thomas Lilti	
2017	Ismael's Ghosts	Rose	Arnaud Desplechin	
2017	3 visages	Claire	Christophe Loizillon	Short
2018	Le doudou	Marie-Luce Gramont	Julien Hervé & Philippe Mechelen	

=== Television ===
Year	Title	Role	Director	Notes
1970	Le chien qui a vu Dieu	Maria	Paul Paviot	TV movie
1974	Madame Bovary	The farmer	Pierre Cardinal	TV movie
1974	Un jeune homme seul	Madame Lièvre	Jean Mailland	TV movie
1980	Aéroport	The president	Pierre Lary	TV series (1 episode)
1980	Médecins de nuit	Madame Gillot	Pierre Lary	TV series (1 episode)
1982	Mérette	Madame Magnoux	Jean-Jacques Lagrange	TV movie
1983	Incertain Léo ou L'amour flou	The mother	Michel Favart	TV movie
1991	Cycle Simenon	Maria	Jacques Fansten	TV series (1 episode)
1993	Point d'orgue	Véronique's mother	Paul Vecchiali	TV movie
1993	Mayrig	Anna	Henri Verneuil	TV mini-series
1993	Une femme sous tension	Suzanne	Agnès Delarive	TV series (1 episode)
1995	Le malingot	Marie	Michel Sibra	TV movie
1996	Docteur Sylvestre	Éliane	Dominique Tabuteau	TV series (1 episode)
1998	Le goût des fraises	Mamiouchka	Frank Cassenti	TV movie
1999	Justice	Madame Ziegler	Gérard Marx	TV series (1 episode)
2006	Louis la brocante	Rose	Michel Favart	TV series (1 episode)
2007	Aller-retour dans la journée	Mélanie	Pierre Sisser	TV movie
2008	Elles et Moi	Madame Bonel	Bernard Stora	TV movie
2009	L'affaire Salengro	Salengro's mother	Yves Boisset	TV movie
2010	Les châtaigniers du désert	Sarah	Caroline Huppert	TV mini-series
2014	La clef des champs	Suzanne	Bertrand Van Effenterre	TV movie
2015	The Returned	Madame Fournet	Fabrice Gobert & Frédéric Goupil	TV series (1 episode)
2016	Dans la tête d'un juré	Colette Ferriol	Emmanuel Bourdieu	TV movie
2016	Un village français	Mamé	Jean-Philippe Amar	TV series (4 episodes)

== Awards and nominations ==
Year	Award	Nominated work	Result
2010	Molière Award for Best Supporting Actress	Les Fausses Confidences	Nominated
2014	Molière Award for Best Supporting Actress	L'Origine du monde	Won
