= Le Bestov =

Compilation album by Les Rita Mitsouko
- Released: November 5, 2001
- Recorded: 1982–2000
- Genre: Chanson, synth-pop
- Length: 73:48
- Label: Virgin

Les Rita Mitsouko chronology
| Cool Frénésie (2000) | Le Bestov (2001) | La Femme Trombone (2002) |

Professional ratings
Review scores
| Source | Rating |
|---|---|
| AllMusic | 3/5 stars |

Le Bestov is a compilation album by French duo Les Rita Mitsouko. Limited quantities came with an accompanying DVD of videos.

== Track listing ==
All tracks are written by Fred Chichin and Catherine Ringer; except where indicated

| No. | Title | Writer(s) | Length |
|---|---|---|---|
| 1. | "Nuit d'ivresse" (From The No Comprendo (1986)) | | 3:39 |
| 2. | "Don't Forget the Nite" (B-Side of "Minuit Dansant" (1982), later released as an A-Side single (1982)) | | 2:42 |
| 3. | "Le Petit Train" (From Marc & Robert (1988)) | Chichin, Marc Fontenoy, Ringer | 5:47 |
| 4. | "Hip Kit" (From Marc & Robert (1988)) | | 4:57 |
| 5. | "Marcia Baïla" (From Rita Mitsouko (1984)) | | 5:34 |
| 6. | "Cool Frénésie" (From Cool Frénésie (2000)) | | 3:52 |
| 7. | "Andy" (From The No Comprendo (1986)) | | 5:24 |
| 8. | "Femme de Moyen Âge" (From Cool Frénésie (2000)) | | 4:47 |
| 9. | "La Sorcière et l'inquisiteur" (From Cool Frénésie (2000)) | | 4:36 |
| 10. | "Mandolino City" (From Marc & Robert (1988)) | Chichin, Jean-Baptiste Mondino, Ringer | 2:14 |
| 11. | "Singing in the Shower" (with Sparks, From Marc & Robert (1988)) | Ron Mael, Russell Mael | 4:23 |
| 12. | "Les Amants" (From Système D (1993)) | | 5:17 |
| 13. | "Les Histoires d'a." (From The No Comprendo (1986)) | | 4:01 |
| 14. | "Y'a d'la Haine" (From Système D (1993)) | | 4:38 |
| 15. | "Alors C'est Quoi" (From Cool Frénésie (2000)) | Chichin, Ringer, Youth | 3:42 |
| 16. | "C'est Comme Ça" (From The No Comprendo (1986)) | | 4:54 |
| 17. | "Clown de Mes Malheurs" (B-Side of C'est Comme Ça (November 1988)) | | 3:13 |

== DVD Track listing ==
1. "Marcia Baïla"
2. "Andy"
3. "Les Histoires d'A"
4. "C'est Comme Ça"
5. "Singing in the Shower"
6. "Le Petit Train"
7. "Hip Kit (William Orbit Remix)"
8. "Les Amants"
9. "Y'a d'La Haine"
10. "Cool Frénésie"
11. "Alors C'est Quoi"
