= Sylvie Joly =

French actress and comedian

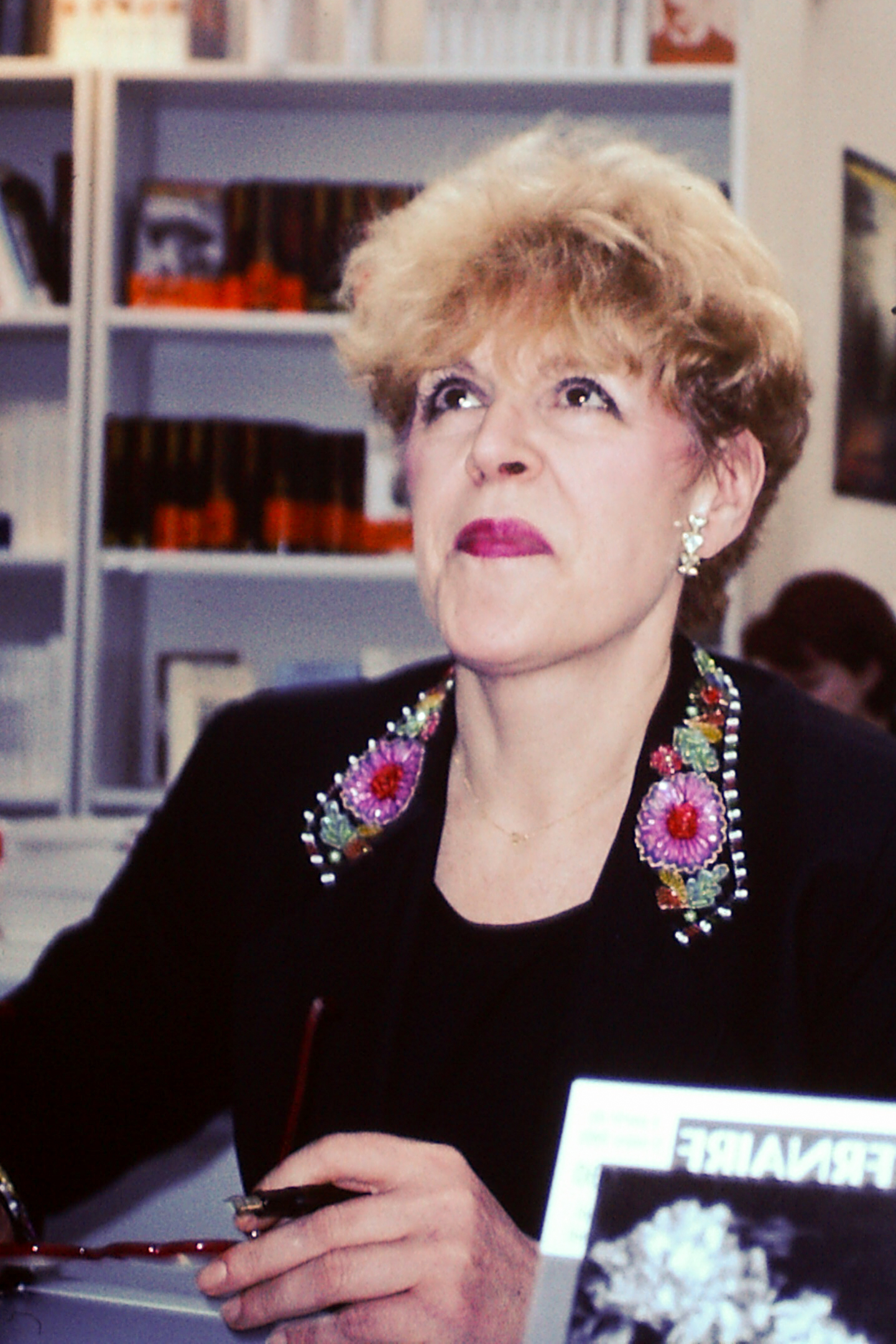
- Born: 18 October 1934; Paris, France
- Died: 4 September 2015 (aged 80); Paris, France
- Occupation: Actress
- Years active: 1972–2007

Sylvie Joly (18 October 1934 – 4 September 2015) was a French actress and comedian. She was best known for her roles in the films Going Places (1974) and Get Out Your Handkerchiefs (1978).

== Personal life ==
Joly was born in Paris. She had a daughter, Mathilde Vitry, and a son Gregoire Vitry. In October 2010, she revealed she had Parkinson's disease.

Joly died from a heart attack on 4 September 2015 in Paris, aged 80.

== Filmography ==
Year	Title	Role	Director	Notes
1972	L'oeuf	The Bus Woman	Jean Herman	
1973	Le provocateur	Françoise Dammard	Bernard Toublanc-Michel	TV series (1 episode)
1973	Oh, If Only My Monk Would Want (Ah! Si mon moine voulait...)	L'aubergiste	Claude Pierson	
1973	Hail the Artist	The Photograph's Wife	Yves Robert	
1974	Paul and Michelle	The Receptionist	Lewis Gilbert	
1974	Going Places	Owner of the Stolen Morgan Plus 4 Car	Bertrand Blier	
1974	Piaf	Lulu	Guy Casaril	
1974	Un curé de choc		Philippe Arnal	TV series (1 episode)
1974	Histoires insolites		Claude Chabrol	TV series (1 episode)
1976	Calmos	The Doctor	Bertrand Blier	
1976	Cours après moi ... que je t'attrape		Robert Pouret	
1978	Get Out Your Handkerchiefs	The Passerbeil	Bertrand Blier	
1978	Va voir maman, papa travaille	Stéphane	François Leterrier	
1978	Vas-y maman	The Director	Nicole de Buron	
1979	Pierrot mon ami	Léonie	François Leterrier	TV movie
1979	Nous maigrirons ensemble	Geneviève Minkiewicz	Michel Vocoret	
1980	Jean-Sans-Terre	The Concierge	Gilles Grangier	TV movie
1981	Le petit théâtre d'Antenne 2	Baronne Dez	Michel Treguer	TV series (1 episode)
1983	Un chien dans un jeu de quilles	Marjolaine	Bernard Guillou	
1983	L'ami de Vincent	Claude	Pierre Granier-Deferre	
1984	Les fauves	Suzanne	Jean-Louis Daniel	
1987	Le Miraculé English: The Miracle	Mrs. Fox Terrier	Jean-Pierre Mocky	Nominated - César Award for Best Supporting Actress
1987	Agent trouble	Edna	Jean-Pierre Mocky	
1987	Septième ciel	Régine Castel	Jean-Louis Daniel	
1988	Les saisons du plaisir	Dominique	Jean-Pierre Mocky	
1988	L'homme à tout faire	Estelle	Patrick Gandery-Réty	TV series (1 episode)
1989	Palace		Jean-Michel Ribes	TV series (1 episode)
1989	Lundi noir	Madame Girard	Jean-François Delassus	TV movie
1989	Les enquêtes du commissaire Maigret	Mother Superior	James Thor	TV series (1 episode)
1991	Ferbac	Angèle Louvier	Marc Rivière	TV series (1 episode)
1991	Mocky story	Pool Woman	Jean-Pierre Mocky	
1992	588 rue paradis	Georgette Sylva	Henri Verneuil	
1993	Mayrig	Georgette Sylva	Henri Verneuil	TV mini-series
1995	Les Misérables	The Innkeeper	Claude Lelouch	
1997	Le surdoué	Madame Legris	Alain Bonnot	TV movie
1997	Le censeur du lycée d'Epinal	Irène Moreau	Marc Rivière	TV movie
1997	Mira la magnifique	The Countess	Agnès Delarive	TV movie
1998	The Visitors II: The Corridors of Time	Gisèle	Jean-Marie Poiré	
1998	La mort du chinois	Café's Owner	Jean-Louis Benoît	
1998	Ça n'empêche pas les sentiments	Hotel's Owner	Jean-Pierre Jackson	
1999	L'ami du jardin	Madame Levadoux-Feuillette	Jean-Louis Bouchaud	
2000	Les frères Soeur	Rolande	Frédéric Jardin	
2000	Ça ira mieux demain	Patient	Jeanne Labrune	
2001	Sa mère, la pute	Café's Owner	Brigitte Roüan	TV movie
2002	Les sarments de la révolte	Jacqueline	Christian François	TV movie
2002	Ma femme s'appelle Maurice	Orlyval Woman	Jean-Marie Poiré	
2002-2007	Malone	Blanche	Didier Le Pêcheur	TV series (5 episodes) (final film role)
2003	Jusqu'au bout de la route	Inès	Jérôme Boivin	TV movie
2004	Vive mon entreprise	Marie-Louise	Daniel Losset	TV movie
2004	Les Dalton	Ma Billy	Philippe Haïm	
2005	À la poursuite de l'amour	Madame Esteban	Laurence Katrian	TV movie
2006	Une histoire de pieds	The Boss	David & Stéphane Foenkinos	Short
2007	L'Auberge rouge	Countess of Marcillac	Gérard Krawczyk	

== Theater ==
Year	Title	Author	Director	Notes
1976	Ne riez jamais d'une femme qui tombe	Henri Mitton	Marika Hodjis	
1982	La vie c'est pas de la rigolade	Henri Mitton	Marika Hodjis	
1984	Triple mixte	Fanny Joly & Alfred Genou	Marika Hodjis	
1984	The Hostage	Brendan Behan	Georges Wilson	
1998	One Woman Show	Sylvie Joly	Marika Hodjis	Nominated - Molière Award - Best One Man Show
2002	Je suis votre idole	Henri Mitton, Thierry, Fanny & Sylvie Joly	François Bourcier	
2004	Fans, je vous aime !	Pierre Bellemare, Jean-Loup Dabadie & Sylvie Joly	Bruno Agati & Alex Lutz	
2005	La Cerise sur le gâteau	Jean-Loup Dabadie, Pierre Palmade, Sylvie Joly ...	Alex Lutz	
