= Acoustiques =

Live album by Les Rita Mitsouko
- Released: 1996
- Recorded: Opus Café, October 1996
- Genres: Chanson, Synth-pop
- Length: 61:15
- Label: Delabel
- Producer: Les Rita Mitsouko

Les Rita Mitsouko chronology
Système D (1993)	Acoustiques (1996)	Cool Frénésie (2000)

Singles from Acoustiques
- 1. "Riche (with Doc Gynéco)" Released: 1996

Professional ratings
Review scores
Source	Rating
Allmusic	3/5 stars

Acoustiques is a live album by French duo Les Rita Mitsouko. "Les Consonnes" and "La Tailles Du Bambou" were new songs at the time of release and made their début on the album.

== Track listing ==
All tracks are written by Fred Chichin and Catherine Ringer; except "Les Consonnes" written and composed by Chichin, Ringer and Solo.

No.	Title	Length
1.	"Nuit d'ivresse"	3:22
2.	"Andy"	6:08
3.	"Stupid Anyway"	4:27
4.	"Marcia Baïla"	5:58
5.	"Ailleurs" (Featuring Princess Erika)	3:54
6.	"Les Histoires d'a."	3:53
7.	"Les Consonnes"	4:54
8.	"Les Amants"	5:26
9.	"Riche" (Featuring Doc Gynéco)	4:31
10.	"Y'a d'la Haine"	4:33
11.	"Chères Petites"	4:57
12.	"La Tailles du Bambou"	3:45
13.	"C'est Comme Ça"	5:27
