= En concert avec l'Orchestre Lamoureux =

Live album by Les Rita Mitsouko
- Released: 2004
- Recorded: Théâtre des Champs-Élysées, Paris
- Genre: Chanson
- Label: Virgin

Les Rita Mitsouko chronology
| La Femme Trombone (2002) | En concert avec l'Orchestre Lamoureux (2004) | Variéty (2007) |

En concert avec l'Orchestre Lamoureux (In concert with the Lamoureux Orchestra) is the second live album by the French duo Les Rita Mitsouko. It was recorded live at the Théâtre des Champs-Élysées by Madje Malki and Laurent Gatignol.

== Track listing ==
| No. | Title | Writer(s) | Length |
|---|---|---|---|
| 1. | "Écoutez la Chanson Bien Douce" | Léo Ferré, Paul Verlaine | 2:41 |
| 2. | "Il Patinait Merveilleusement" | Ferré, Verlaine | 2:07 |
| 3. | "Ô Triste" | Ferré, Verlaine | 2:35 |
| 4. | "Triton" | Fred Chichin, Catherine Ringer | 4:06 |
| 5. | "La Fille Venue du Froid" | Chichin, Ringer | 5:52 |
| 6. | "Les Guerriers" | Marc Anciaux, Chichin, Ringer | 3:32 |
| 7. | "A Man Needs a Maid" | Neil Young | 4:40 |
| 8. | "Mad Rush" | Philip Glass | 8:37 |
| 9. | "Le Velours des Vierges" | Serge Gainsbourg | 3:22 |
| 10. | "Où Sont-Ils Donc?" | Albert Lasry, Charles Trénet | 2:37 |
| 11. | "Trop Bonne" | Chichin, Iso Diop, Ringer | 3:28 |
| 12. | "La Sorcière et l'inquisiteur" | Chichin, Ringer | 4:39 |
| 13. | "Andy" | Chichin, Ringer | 4:48 |
