= Re (Les Rita Mitsouko album) =

Remix album by Les Rita Mitsouko
- Released: October 10, 1990
- Recorded: 1984–1990; Mixed at Guerilla Studio, Studio Six, Studio Davout, Good Earth Studio and Jungle Love Studio
- Genre: House, synthpop
- Length: 66:55
- Label: Virgin France CD 30328
- Producer: Tony Visconti, Les Rita Mitsouko, Conny Plank

Les Rita Mitsouko chronology
Marc & Robert (1988)	Re (1990)	Système D (1993)

Singles from Re
- 1. "Hip Kit" b/w "Andy Live" Released: October 1990; 2. "Don't Forget the Nite (Remix)" b/w "Don't Forget the Nite" Released: 1991

Professional ratings
Review scores
Source	Rating
Allmusic	3/5 stars
Select	3/5 medals

Re is a remix album by French pop rock group Les Rita Mitsouko. It was released in 1990 and includes the singles "Hip Kit" and "Don't Forget the Nite". The album is compilation of new remixes, 12" single remixes and a new re-recording.

Receiving mixed reviews the album was originally released as a Double-LP, 5x12" single, Cassette and CD in October 1990. The artwork was designed by Judith E. Christ with photography by Stephane Sednaoui. Catherine Ringer and Fred Chichin pose in clothing designed by Jean-Paul Gaultier.

== Conception ==
The album was conceived by Fred Chichin as a remix project material from the group's first three studio albums (Rita Mitsouko (1984), The No Comprendo (1986) and Marc & Robert (1988)). Chichin remixed half of the material under the alias 'Fat Freddy'. The remaining tracks are remixes by William Orbit, Mark Moore and Jesse Johnson compiled from former singles. The group's 1982 single "Don't Forget the Nite" was completely re-recorded for the project with producer Tony Visconti.

== Singles ==
William Orbit's remix of "Hip Kit" was released as the first single backed with Fat Freddy's mix of their 1986 single "Andy". The re-recording of "Don't Forget the Nite" was released as the second single the following year. The 7" was backed with the original 1982 recording. The twelve-inch was backed with Fat Freddy's mix "Nuit d'ivresse". Neither single charted.

== Track listing ==
All tracks are written by Fred Chichin and Catherine Ringer; except where indicated

Side one
No.	Title	Writer(s)	Remixer	Length
1.	"Hip Kit" (Vocals by Russell Mael and Catherine Ringer. Little Girl vocals by Ginger)		William Orbit	7:12
2.	"Nuit d'ivresse"		Fat Freddy	6:35
3.	"Le Petit Train"	Chichin, Marc Fontenoy, Ringer	Fat Freddy	4:57

Side two
No.	Title	Remixer	Length
4.	"Tongue Dance"	William Orbit and Mark Moore	5:05
5.	"Andy Bassapella"	Jesse Johnson	6:08
6.	"Don't Forget the Nite"	Mixed by Tony Visconti and Les Rita Mitsouko	4:45

Side three
No.	Title	Remixer	Length
7.	"C'est Comme Ça"	Tony Visconti and Les Rita Mitsouko	7:25
8.	"Andy Live"	Fat Freddy	6:52
9.	"Marcia Baïla"	Tony Visconti and Les Rita Mitsouko	5:56

Side four
No.	Title	Writer(s)	Remixer	Length
10.	"Jalousie"		Dee Nasty and Fat Freddy	6:00
11.	"Singing in the Shower" (with Sparks)	Ron and Russell Mael	William Orbit	5:46

== Personnel ==
- Tony Visconti and Les Rita Mitsouko - Producer (all tracks except "Marcia Baïla" and "Jalousie")
- Conny Plank - Producer ("Marcia Baïla" and "Jalousie")
- Pascal Garnon - Engineer ("Nuit d'ivresse", "Le Petit Train", "Andy Live", "Jalousie")
- Raphael - Mastering
- Jacques Robakowsky - Special Mastering
- Stephane Sednaoui - Photography
- Judith E. Christ - Graphic Design
- Jean-Paul Gaultier - Clothing
