= La Femme Trombone =

Studio album by Les Rita Mitsouko
- Released: September 1, 2002
- Recorded: Studio Six (Paris)
- Genre: Chanson, synth-pop
- Label: Virgin
- Producer: Iso Diop and Les Rita Mitsouko

Les Rita Mitsouko chronology
Le Bestov (2001)	La Femme Trombone (2002)	En concert avec l'Orchestre Lamoureux (2004)

Singles from La Femme Trombone
- 1. "Triton" Released: 2002; 2. "Sasha" Released: 2002

La Femme Trombone (The Trombone Woman) is the sixth studio album by Les Rita Mitsouko.

== Track listing ==
No.	Title	Writer(s)	Length
1.	"Entrée"	Fred Chichin, Iso Diop	1:26
2.	"Évasion"	Chichin, Diop, Catherine Ringer	3:06
3.	"Vieux Rodéo"	Chichin, Ringer	3:37
4.	"Triton"	Chichin, Diop, Ringer	4:09
5.	"Trop Bonne"	Chichin, Diop, Ringer	4:03
6.	"Tous Mes Voeux"	Chichin, Diop, Ringer	3:45
7.	"Tu Me Manques"	Chichin, Ringer	4:49
8.	"J'applaudis"	Chichin, Ringer	3:30
9.	"Melodica"	Chichin, Ringer	2:38
10.	"Interlude"	Chichin, Diop	1:26
11.	"Ce Sale Ton"	Chichin, Ringer	3:31
12.	"Sacha"	Chichin, Ringer	3:41
13.	"1928"	Chichin, Ringer	3:35
