= Singing in the Shower =

Singing in the Shower may refer to bathroom singing.

Singing in the Shower may also refer to:

- "Singing in the Shower", a song by Ornette Coleman from the 1988 album Virgin Beauty
- "Singing in the Shower", a song by Les Rita Mitsouko, featuring Sparks, from the 1988 album Marc & Robert
- "Singing in the Shower", a song by Juliana Hatfield from the 2004 album In Exile Deo
