= Rita Mitsouko (album) =

Studio album by Les Rita Mitsouko
- Released: April 1984
- Recorded: Conny's Studio, Köln, Germany; Studio Rita Mitsouko, Paris
- Genres: New wave, synth-pop
- Length: 38:24; 59:30 (with bonus tracks)
- Label: Virgin LP 70238
- Producers: Conny Plank, Les Rita Mitsouko

Les Rita Mitsouko chronology
Rita Mitsouko (1984)	The No Comprendo (1986)

Singles from Rita Mitsouko
- 1. "Minuit Dansant" b/w "Galoping" Released: January 1982; 2. "Don't Forget the Nite" b/w "Aïe (Kryptonite Miss Spleïn)" Released: February 1982; 3. "Restez Avec Moi" b/w "Dans la Steppe" Released: 1984; 4. "Marcia Baïla" b/w "Jalousie" Released: April 1985

Rita Mitsouko is the début studio album by the French pop rock group Les Rita Mitsouko. It was released in April 1984 and includes the singles "Restez Avec Moi" and "Marcia Baïla".

The album was recorded with veteran producer Conny Plank at Conny's Studio, Köln, Germany, and Studio Rita Mitsouko, Paris, with overdubs in Conny's Place. Receiving positive reviews, the album was originally released as an LP, cassette and CD in April 1984. CD editions include five bonus tracks. The artwork was designed by Les Rita Mitsouko and Atiai with photography by Bernard Pichon and Jean-Louis Sautreau.

At the time of release the group was simply called Rita Mitsouko. In the interim between the début and 1986's The No Comprendo, Catherine Ringer and Fred Chichin amended their name, adding 'Les' to 'Rita Mitsouko'. The decision was made to negate the possibility that audiences would identify the name as referring to Catherine Ringer only as opposed to a musical group.

== Singles ==
"Restez Avec Moi" preceded the release of the album but failed to chart. It was backed with "Dans la Steppe", a song that was later re-recorded by the group and issued with the shortened title "La Steppe" on 1993's Système D.

"Marcia Baïla" became a surprise hit single in France the spring of 1985. The song had a long chart trajectory, remaining on the Top 50 charts for 29 weeks. It debuted at #33 on April 27, 1985, and climbed regularly until it peaked at #2 for three consecutive weeks. In all, it spent 17 weeks in the Top Ten.
The song was Rita Mitsouko's first big hit and propelled them to considerable fame.

== Reception ==
Professional ratings
Review scores
Source	Rating
Allmusic	4/5 stars

Rita Mitsouko received positive reviews from the majority of critics.

The French edition of Rolling Stone magazine named this album the 20th greatest French rock album (out of 100).

== Track listing ==
All tracks are written by Fred Chichin and Catherine Ringer; except where noted.

Side one
No.	Title	Writer(s)	Length
1.	"Restez Avec Moi"		4:13
2.	"Jalousie"		4:30
3.	"Le Futur Nº 4"	Chichin, Jean Naplin, Ringer	3:34
4.	"La Fille Venue du Froid"		7:01

Side two
No.	Title	Length
5.	"Yaktagan"	3:28
6.	"In My Tea"	2:57
7.	"Marcia Baïla"	5:35
8.	"Oum Khalsoum"	4:10
9.	"Amnésie"	2:58

CD bonus tracks
No.	Title	Length
10.	"Don't Forget the Nite" (B-Side of "Minuit Dansant" (1982), later released as an A-Side single (1982))	2:42
11.	"Galoping" (12" B-Side of "Minuit Dansant" (1982))	5:01
12.	"Dans la Steppe" (B-Side of "Restez Avec Moi" (1984))	4:12
13.	"Minuit Dansant" (A-Side single (1982))	4:01
14.	"Aïe (Kryptonite Miss Spleïn)" (B-Side of "Don't Forget the Nite" (1982))	5:09

== Personnel ==
Musicians

- Fred Chichin - Framus, Telecaster, Fender Coronado, Höfner, Oberheim, VCS 3, Emulator, rhythm computer, drums, tambourine, bells
- Catherine Ringer - vocals, Elka Rhapsody, organ, piano, Oberheim, Vcs3, Arp, Höfner, Framus, Spanish guitar, rhythm computer, drums

Technical and visual

- Conny Plank, Rita Mitsouko - producer
- Conny Plank, Fred Chichin, Dave Hutchins - recording
- Conny Plank, Dave Hutchins - overdubs
- Rita Mitsouko, Atiai - cover concept, artwork
- Atiai - neon design, back cover coloriseur, front cover, thanks for use of his rhythm computer
- Jean-Louis Sautreau - back cover photography
- Bernard Pichon - front cover photography
- Jade House Ltd., Mankin Industries - management
