= Jacky Nercessian =

French actor (born 1950)

- Born: November 16, 1950 (age 76); Saint-Etienne,

Jacky Nercessian (or Nersessian (Armenian: Ժաքի Ներսեսյան), born November 16, 1950) is a French actor who is ethnically Armenian. One of his most known roles is Apkar in Mayrig by Henri Verneuil.

== Biography ==
Nercessian was born in 1950 in Saint-Etienne. He graduated from the Department of Theology to become a Pastor in England. He has played both in cinema and TV – including the role of Mustafa Ismael Faruki in Long Journey (Golden Lion for the Best Feature Film, Venice IFF, 2004). Nercessian played in the Theatre of Renaissance for one season and later toured with the Last Call. In 2009 he starred in Everybody Loves Juliet at Splendid Theatre. In 2010, he appeared in Luc Besson’s blockbuster Extraordinary Adventures of Adèle Blanc-Sec.

== Selected filmography ==
- The Little Thief (1988)
- Sushi Sushi (1991)
- Mayrig (1991)
- Les dents de ma mère (1991)
- 588 rue paradis (1992)
- Les Mamies (1992)
- La Soif de l'or (1993)
- Why Is Mother in My Bed? (1994)
- Colonel Chabert (1994)
- The Bait (1995)
- The Three Brothers (1995)
- Les Parasites (1999)
- Le Double de ma moitié (1999)
- Monsieur Naphtali (1999)
- L'Algérie des chimères (2001)
- Les Rois mages (2001)
- Napoléon (2002)
- The Butterfly (2002)
- Lovely Rita, sainte patronne des cas désespérés (2003)
- Le Grand Voyage (2004)
- Pédale dure (2004)
- Quartier V.I.P. (2005)
- La femme coquelicot (TV Movie, 2005)
- Il ne faut jurer... de rien! (2005)
- Le cactus (2005)
- Incontrôlable (2006)
- Comedy of Power (2006)
- Jean-Philippe (2006)
- Capitaine Casta: Amélie a disparu (TV Movie, 2006)
- Let's Dance (2007)
- Commis d'office (2009)
- The Extraordinary Adventures of Adèle Blanc-Sec (2010)
- In the Name of the Son (2012)
- Joséphine s'arrondit (2016)
- Waiting for You (2017)
- Bernadette (2023)
