= Cool Frénésie =

Cool frénésie

Studio album by Les Rita Mitsouko
- Released: March 7, 2000
- Recorded: Studio Francis and Labomatic
- Genre: Rock, pop
- Length: 64:41
- Label: Delabel
- Producer: Les Rita Mitsouko

Les Rita Mitsouko chronology
Acoustiques (1996)	Cool frénésie (2000)	Le Bestov (2001)

Singles from Cool frénésie
- 1. "Cool frénésie" Released: 2000; 2. "Alors c'est quoi" Released: 2000; 3. "Femme de Moyen-Âge" Released: 2000

Cool frénésie (lit: Cool Frenzy) is the fifth studio album by French duo Les Rita Mitsouko.

== Track listing ==
All tracks are written by Fred Chichin and Catherine Ringer; except where indicated

No.	Title	Writer(s)	Length
1.	"Cool frénésie"		3:52
2.	"Femme de Moyen-Âge"		4:46
3.	"Toi & moi & elle"		5:34
4.	"La sorcière et l'inquisiteur"		4:34
5.	"Dis-moi des mots"	Chichin, Ringer, Philippe Glémée	4:26
6.	"Allo !"		4:49
7.	"Gripshitrider in Paris"		4:13
8.	"C'était un homme"		4:34
9.	"Les guerriers"	Marc Anciaux, Chichin, Ringer	3:32
10.	"Fatigué d'être fatigué"		4:20
11.	"Pense à ta carrière"		5:16
12.	"Un zéro"	Anciaux, Chichin, Philippe Niel, Ringer	4:16
13.	"Alors c'est quoi"	Chichin, Ringer, Youth	3:41
14.	"Jam"	Chichin, Ringer, Youth	6:37
