= Variety (Les Rita Mitsouko album) =

Variéty

Studio album by Les Rita Mitsouko
- Released: April 16, 2007; July 2, 2007 (English version)
- Recorded: Studio Gang (Paris), Studio Six (Paris), Alice's Restaurant (New York City)
- Genre: Chanson, pop rock
- Length: 51:19
- Label: Wagram, Because Music; WEA International
- Producer: Les Rita Mitsouko and Mark Plati

Les Rita Mitsouko chronology
En concert avec l'Orchestre Lamoureux (2004)	Variéty (2007)

Singles from Variéty
- 1. "Communiqueur d'amour" Released: 2007; 2. "Ding Dang Dong (Ringing At Your Bell)" Released: 2007; 3. "Même Si" Released: 2007; 4. "L'ami Ennemi" Released: 2007

Professional ratings
Review scores
Source	Rating
Allmusic	2.5/5 stars

Variéty is the seventh and last studio album by Les Rita Mitsouko. An English-language version of the album was produced for the international English speaking market under the modified title of Variety. The French-language version reached No. 5 on the French Albums chart, while the English recording peaked at #163.

== Track listing ==
=== Variéty (French version) ===
All tracks are written by Fred Chichin and Catherine Ringer; except where indicated

No.	Title	Writer(s)	Length
1.	"L'ami Ennemi"		3:53
2.	"Communiqueur d'amour"		3:46
3.	"Rêverie"		3:37
4.	"Berceuse"		2:43
5.	"Même Si"		3:32
6.	"Rendez-vous Avec Moi-même"		4:20
7.	"She's a Chameleon"	Chichin, Ringer, R. Wooten (Lyrics)	3:46
8.	"Soir de Peine"		3:16
9.	"Badluck Queen"		4:22
10.	"Ma Vieille Ville"		3:31
11.	"Ding Ding Dong (Ringing At Your Bell)"	Chichin, Djelil (Music), Ringer	3:39
12.	"Terminal Beauty" (Featuring Serj Tankian)		3:45

Bonus tracks
No.	Title	Length
13.	"Berceuse (Version Chinois Mandarin)"	2:41
14.	"Communic' Hearts in Love"	3:45
15.	"Terminal Beauté"	3:44

=== Variety (English version) ===
All tracks are written by Fred Chichin and Catherine Ringer; except where indicated

No.	Title	Writer(s)	Length
1.	"So Called Friend"		3:53
2.	"Communic' Hearts in Love"		3:46
3.	"Daydream"		3:37
4.	"Lullaby"		2:44
5.	"Even If (Même Si)"		3:32
6.	"Big Bone to Chew"		4:20
7.	"She's a Chameleon"	Chichin, Ringer, R. Wooten (Lyrics)	3:46
8.	"Time You Call"		3:16
9.	"Bad Luck Queen"		4:22
10.	"Paris (France)"		3:31
11.	"Ding Dang Dong (Rolling on the Floor)"	Chichin, Djelil (Music), Ringer	3:40
12.	"Terminal Beauty" (Featuring Serj Tankian)		4:03

Bonus tracks
No.	Title	Length
13.	"Soir de Peine"	2:44
14.	"Ma Vieille Ville"	3:48
