= Marcia Moretto =

Argentine dancer (1946–1983)

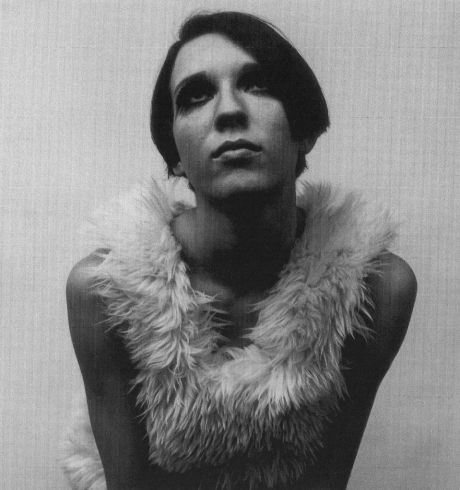
Marcia Moretto

Marcia Lynn Moretto (born July 18, 1946, in Illinois, USA and died May 21, 1983, in Paris, France) was a dancer, choreographer and director.

She worked with Armando Llamas and also taught dance in Sartrouville in the 1970s. Her students included Catherine Ringer and Fred Chichin, the duo of Les Rita Mitsouko. Their song "Marcia Baila" is a tribute to Marcia Moretto.

She died in 1983 at the age of 36 of a fast-moving breast cancer.
