= The No Comprendo =

Studio album by Les Rita Mitsouko
- Released: 20 September 1986
- Recorded: Studio Good Earth, London; Studio Rita Mitsouko, Paris
- Genre: New wave, pop rock, synthpop
- Length: 51:31
- Label: Virgin LP 70465
- Producer: Tony Visconti, Les Rita Mitsouko

Les Rita Mitsouko chronology
Rita Mitsouko (1984)	The No Comprendo (1986)	Marc & Robert (1988)

Singles from The No Comprendo
- 1. "Andy" b/w "Un Soir un Chien" Released: June 1986; 2. "C'est Comme Ça" b/w "Clown de Mes Malheurs" Released: November 1986; 3. "Les Histoires d’a." b/w "Amnésie" Released: June 1987

The No Comprendo (Long title: Les Rita Mitsouko Présentent The No Comprendo) is the second studio album by French pop rock group Les Rita Mitsouko. It was released in 1986 and includes the singles "Andy", "C'est Comme Ça" and "Les Histoires d’A.".

The album was recorded with veteran producer Tony Visconti at Studio Good Earth, London, Studio Rita Mitsouko, Paris and mixed at Studio Good Earth. Receiving positive reviews the album was originally released as an LP, Cassette and CD in September 1986. CD editions include a bonus track. The artwork was designed by Yves Méry with photography by Brett Walker.

The album was the first of two albums by the duo that Les Rita Mitsouko produced on collaboration with Tony Visconti. Together with Visconti the trio shared production and musician roles regularly swapping and sharing duties across a variety of instruments.

Prior to the album the group was simply called Rita Mitsouko. In the interim between the début and 1986's The No Comprendo, Catherine Ringer and Fred Chichin amended their name adding 'Les' to 'Rita Mitsouko'. The decision was made to negate the possibility that audiences would identify the name as referring to Catherine Ringer only as opposed to a musical group.

== Singles ==
"Andy" was released as the lead single preceding the album. It was backed with the band's preferred single choice "Un Soir un Chien". Twelve inch versions included "Bad Days" as a second b-side. US twelve inch versions included remixes by Jesse Johnson. The single peaked at #19 on the French Singles Chart and #11 on the US Hot Dance Club Play chart. "C'est Comme Ça" was released as the second single backed with the new b-side "Clown de Mes Malheurs". The single peaked at #10 on the French Singles chart becoming the group's second and final top ten hit. The music video directed by Jean-Baptiste Mondino was awarded "Music video of the year" by the annual French award ceremony Victoires de la Musique in 1987. "Les Histoires d'a." was released as the third and final single backed with the Rita Mitsouko album track "Amnésie". It did not chart.

== Reception ==
Professional ratings
Review scores
Source	Rating
Allmusic	3/5 stars
NME	Positive

The No Comprendo received positive reviews from the majority of critics. Victoires de la Musique awarded The No Comprendo "Album of the year" in 1987. The French edition of Rolling Stone magazine named the album the 7th greatest French rock album (out of 100).

== Track listing ==
All tracks are written by Fred Chichin and Catherine Ringer; except where noted.

Side one
No.	Title	Length
1.	"Les Histoires D'A."	4:00
2.	"Andy"	5:24
3.	"C'est Comme Ça"	4:53
4.	"Vol de Nuit"	4:09
5.	"Someone to Love"	3:03

Side two
No.	Title	Writer(s)	Length
6.	"Stupid Anyway"		4:46
7.	"Un Soir un Chien"		5:41
8.	"Bad Days"		5:00
9.	"Tonite" (Some editions replace "Tonite" with "Marcia Baïla")	Chichin, Philippe Glémée	5:01
10.	"Nuit d'ivresse"		3:39
11.	"Andy (English Version)" (CD bonus track)		5:55

== Personnel ==
Musicians

- Fred Chichin – Keyboards, Guitar, Bass, Drums, Vocals, Acoustic Guitar
- Catherine Ringer – Guitar, Keyboards, Vocals, Midi Brass, Bass, Strings, Drums, Midi Trumpet, Midi Accordion, Piano, Violin, Cello, Congas
- Tony Visconti – Acoustic Guitar, Bass, Double Bass, Tambourine, Midi Guitar, Drums, Violin, Cello
- Graham Ward – Drums on "Les Histoires d'a."
- Bobby Valentino – Violin on "Les Histoires d'a." and "Tonite"
- Sam Smith – Guitar Solo on "C'est Comme Ça"
- Luís Jardim – Percussion on "Nuit d'ivresse"
- Andy Mackintosh – Saxophone on "Nuit d'ivresse"
- Pete Beachill – Trombone on "Nuit d'ivresse"
- Guy Barker – Trumpet on "Nuit d'ivresse"

Technical and visual

- Catherine Ringer, Fred Chichin, Tony Visconti – Producer
- Dominique, Fred Chichin, Sid Wells – Engineering
- Sam Smith – Assistant Engineer
- Catherine Ringer, Fred Chichin, Sid Wells, Tony Visconti – Mixing
- Brett Walker – Photography
- Yves Méry – Graphics
