= Système D =

Studio album by Les Rita Mitsouko
- Released: November 16, 1993
- Recorded: Essaouira, Morocco; Studio 6, Paris, Studio Davout, Paris, Studio Mega, Paris
- Genre: Pop rock, synth-pop, funk
- Length: 61:17
- Label: Virgin LP 8391461, Delabel
- Producer: Les Rita Mitsouko

Les Rita Mitsouko chronology
Re (1990)	Système D (1993)	Acoustiques (1996)

Singles from Système D
- 1. "Y'a d'la Haine" Released: December 1993; 2. "Les Amants" Released: 1994; 3. "Femme d’affaires" Released: 1994

Système D is the fourth studio album by French pop rock group Les Rita Mitsouko. It was released in 1993 and reached number seven on the French Albums Chart. Système D includes the singles "Y’A D’La Haine", "Les Amants", and "Femme d’Affaires".

The album was recorded and produced by Fred Chichin and Catherine Ringer largely at a large Moroccan house situated in Essaouira (Formerly Mogador), where the group set up their studio. Initially the group had intended to produce the album with veteran producer Tony Visconti, having previously worked together on the group's previous two albums. Ringer and Chichin chose to produce the album themselves to find a new sound. The album was completed in the Parisian studios of Studio 6, Studio Davout, and Studio Mega. The album was mixed by American mixer Carmen Rizzo in Studio Davout.

Receiving good reviews the album was originally released as a double-LP, Cassette and CD in November 1993. The artwork was designed and photographed by Achay, Catherine Ringer and Sednaoui.

== Track listing ==
All tracks are written by Fred Chichin/Catherine Ringer; except where indicated.

No.	Title	Writer(s)	Length
1.	"Au fond du couloir"		3:45
2.	"Get Up, Get Older"	Xavier, Ringer/Chichin	5:21
3.	"Y'a d'la haine"		4:37
4.	"La steppe"		4:39
5.	"Les amants"		5:17
6.	"L'hôtel particulier"	Serge Gainsbourg	3:36
7.	"Femme d'affaires"		3:39
8.	"My Love is Bad"		4:53
9.	"Chanson d'A."		3:16
10.	"Elevator"		2:26
11.	"Godfather of Soul"		3:33
12.	"Chères petites"		4:31
13.	"La belle vie"	Ringer/Chichin, Glemee	5:08
14.	"Moderne baleine"		6:11

== Personnel ==
Musicians

- Fred Chichin - bass (1–3, 8, 10, 11, 14), Guitar (all), sampler (2)
- Gerald Manceau - drums (all), percussion (1, 2, 12–14), organ (1), bass (2), electric percussion (3)
- Catherine Ringer - vocals (all), yukulele (2), keyboards (3–6, 8, 9, 12), bass (6, 7, 12), acoustic guitar (14), synthesizer (14)
- DJ Dee Nasty - scratches (2–4, 10, 11)
- Marina Xavier - vocals (2, 11)
- Noel Assoolo - bass (4, 5, 13)
- Richard Galliano - accordion (5, 12)
- Jermone - wind harp (6)
- Richie Cannata - saxophone (8, 10)
- Iggy Pop - vocals (8)
- Georges Bonastre - end guitar solo (11)

Technical and visual

- Les Rita Mitsouko - producer
- Carmen Rizzo - mixing (at Davout, Paris)
- Raphael - mastering (at Translab, Paris)
- Gerald Manceau - all programming
- Monte Christo - mixing coordination
- Jacques Robackowski - studio setting and maintenance in Morocco
- Pascal Garnon, Jeff, Yo, Patrice, Nicholas - assistants
- Achay, Catherine Ringer, Sednaoui - design, photography
- Studio Favre, Lhaik - artwork coordination
