= Les Rita Mitsouko =

French band

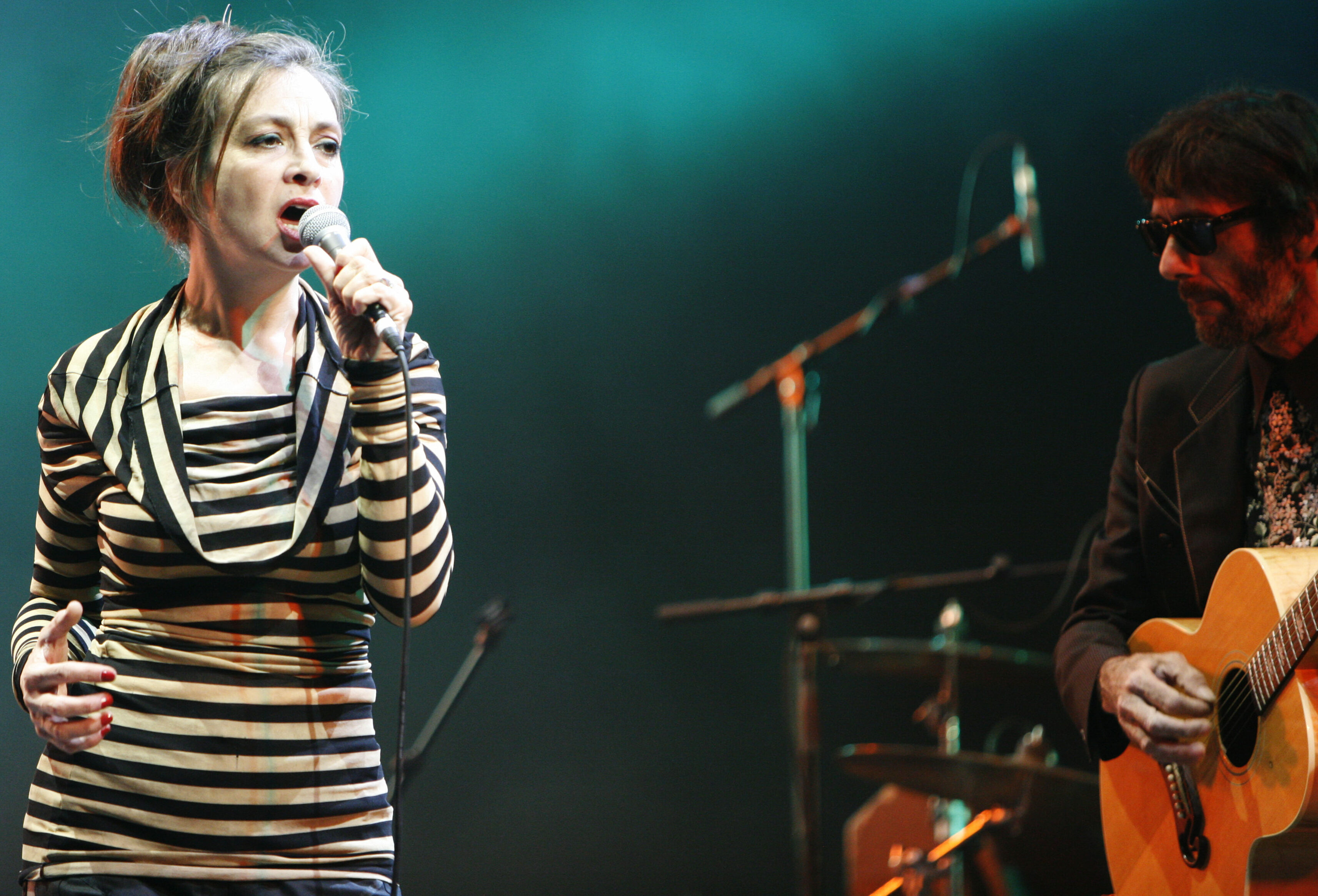
- Les Rita Mitsouko at the Eurockéennes, 2007

Background information
- Origin: Paris, France
- Genres: New wave; pop rock; alternative rock; chanson
- Years active: 1980–2007
- Labels: Because Music; Delabel; Virgin France
- Past members: Fred Chichin; Catherine Ringer
- Website: lesritamitsouko.com

Les Rita Mitsouko (French pronunciation: [le ʁita mitsuko], translation: The Rita Mitsukos) were a French pop rock group formed by Fred Chichin and Catherine Ringer. The duo first performed as Rita Mitsouko at Gibus Club in Paris in 1980. They went on to become one of the most acclaimed musical acts in France. "Marcia Baila", their debut single produced by Conny Plank, went to number 2 in the French singles chart in 1984. They then started a collaboration with producer Tony Visconti on two albums: the No Comprendo (1986) and Marc & Robert (1988). "Singing in the Shower", sung as a duet with Sparks, was a commercial success in France and was then heavily played on US dance radio stations in 1988. Iggy Pop also collaborated with them on 1993's Système D, duetting with Ringer on "My Love Is Bad".

Chichin died from cancer in 2007. Instead of continuing as Les Rita Mitsouko, Ringer completed a final tour, "Catherine Ringer chante Les Rita Mitsouko and more" (Catherine Ringer sings Les Rita Mitsouko and more), and started a solo career.

Ringer died of cancer in 2026.

== History ==
The duo has stated that the name "Rita Mitsouko" originated from the combination of Catherine Ringer's childhood friend and the name of a meal they enjoyed in a local Japanese restaurant soon after they met.

According to the French Wikipedia the name of the group was chosen to reflect the band's extremely diverse musical reference: Rita refers to the South American music (and the iconic actress Rita Hayworth). Mitsouko is the French spelling of the Japanese first name Mitsuko, and is also the name of a perfume by Guerlain. The group originally went by the name "Rita Mitsouko" but in 1985 "Les" was added when they realized that many people believed the name of the group was that of the singer.

Rita Mitsouko began performing in the early 1980s in alternative spaces such as the Pali-Kao, a squatted factory building in Belleville, Paris.

The band first achieved major popular success in 1985, with the release of the second single from their first album: "Marcia baila" rose to number 2 on the French record charts that summer. Philippe Gautier directed a vibrant and widely viewed music video to accompany the record. "Marcia Baila" is an homage to the choreographer and dancer Marcia Moretto, with whom Catherine Ringer had studied and performed in the 1970s. Moretto died of cancer in 1983 at the age of 36.

Rita Mitsouko was a creative and eccentric first album, combining elements of punk, rock, synthpop and jazz. Coupled with the band's colorful, wild, over-the-top image, it brought Rita Mitsouko to the attention of some important anglophone listeners. In October 1985, they contributed a cover version of "All Tomorrow's Parties" for the Velvet Underground tribute album Les Enfants du Velvet.

The American record producer and musician Tony Visconti produced the band's next two albums, The No Comprendo and Marc et Robert, helping to polish and perfect their sound. These two albums have both French and English lyrics. The most successful singles from these albums were "C'est comme ça" ("That's the Way It Is") and "Andy".

The American band Sparks collaborated with Les Rita Mitsouko on Marc et Robert. Russell Mael sings lead vocals with Catherine Ringer on three of the album's tracks, "Singing in the Shower", "Live in Las Vegas" and "Hip Kit". "Singing in the Shower" was included on the soundtrack of the Ridley Scott film Black Rain.

Jean-Baptiste Mondino directed most of Les Rita Mitsouko's music videos in the 1980s.

Jean-Luc Godard's 1987 feature film Soigne ta droite incorporates documentary footage of the band's The No Comprendo recording sessions.

In 1991, they made the music of the movie My Life Is Hell, directed by Josiane Balasko.

In 1993, the video of "Y'a d'la haine", from the album Système D, was awarded Clip of the Year by MTV Europe.

On Système D, Ringer sings a duet, "My Love Is Bad", with Iggy Pop. Variéty also includes a vocal duo in which Ringer is joined by the guest musician Serj Tankian (from System of a Down).

Les Rita Mitsouko's album Variéty was released in 2007 in both French and in English (Variety) versions; it was produced by Mark Plati.

On Wednesday 28 November 2007, Chichin died from cancer while the band had just cancelled their previous concert dates in Paris. He had been diagnosed only two months before. Ringer toured under her own name following his death.

Ringer died of cancer on 14 September 2026.

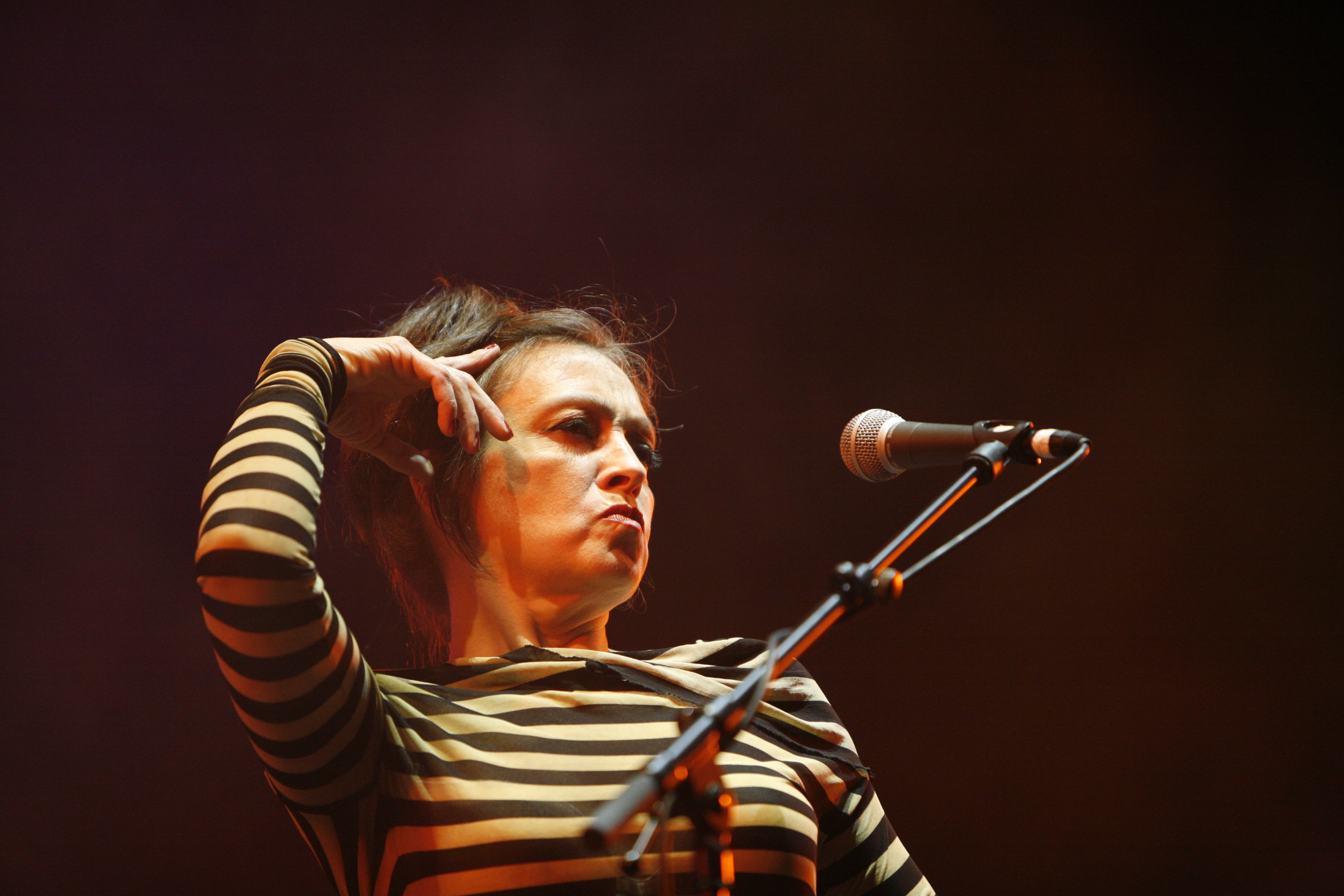

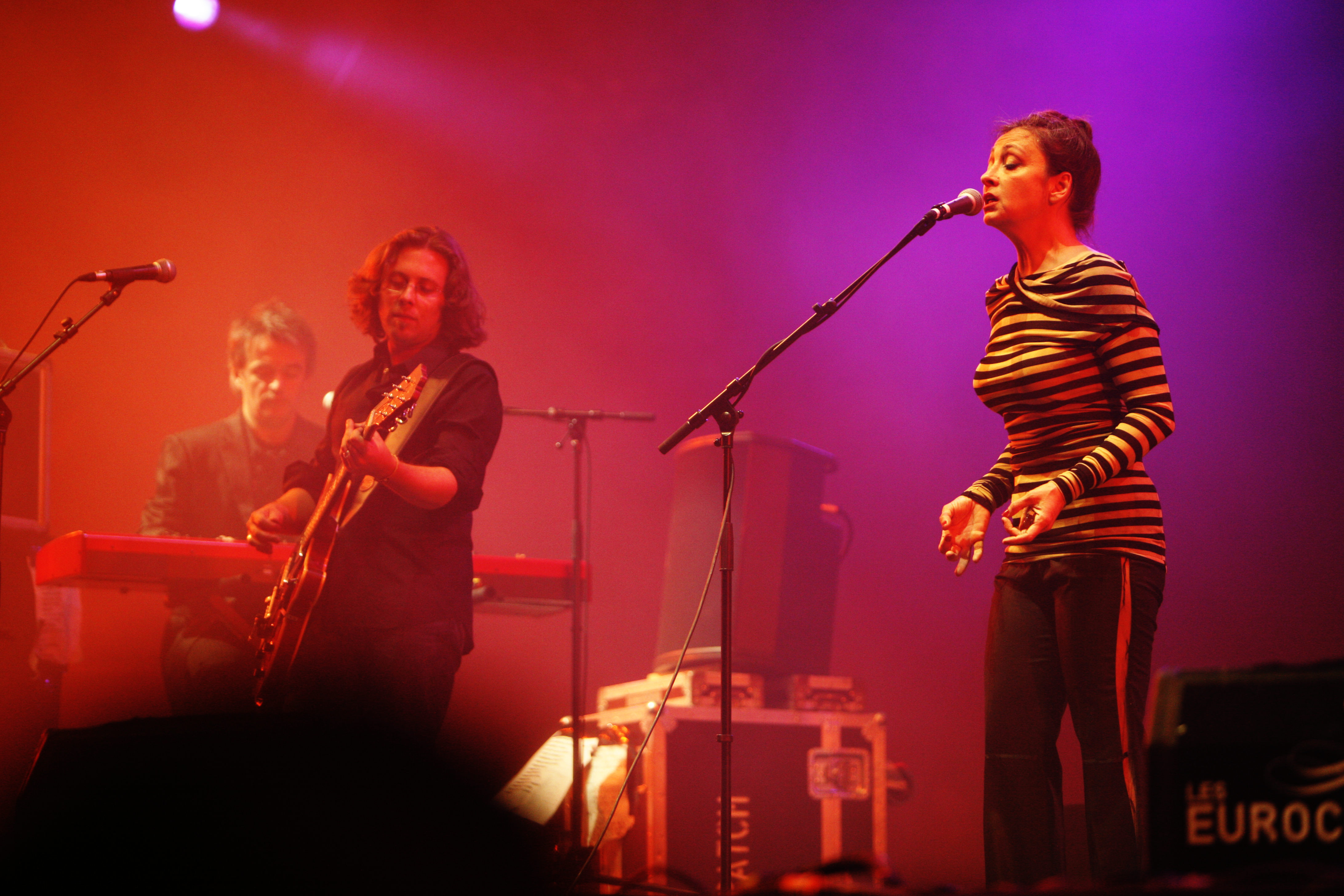

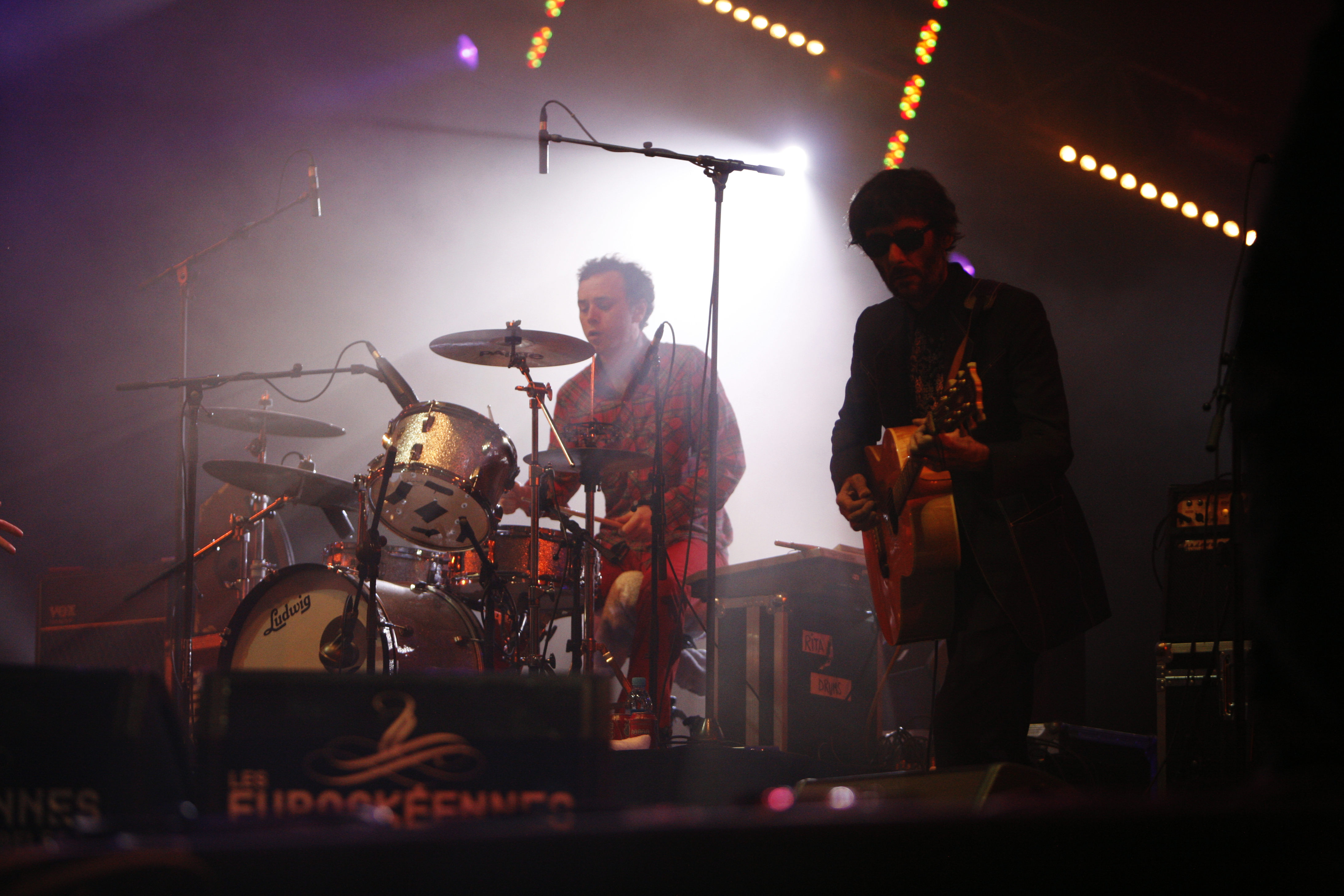

== Discography ==
Les Rita Mitsouko discography
- Studio albums: 7
- Extended plays: 1
- Live albums: 3
- Compilation albums: 3
- Singles: 27
- Video albums: 1
- Music videos: 12

The discography of Les Rita Mitsouko, the French pop-rock duo, consists of seven studio albums, two compilations, one remix album, three live albums, two extended plays, twenty-seven singles, one video and twelve music videos.

=== Studio albums ===
Year	Album information	Chart positions		
Year	Album information	FR	BEL	SWI
1984	Rita Mitsouko: Released: April 1984; Labels: Virgin Records SA	37	–	–
1986	The No Comprendo: Released: 20 September 1986; Labels: Virgin Records SA	9	–	–
1988	Marc & Robert: Released: 7 November 1988; Labels: Virgin Records SA	35	–	–
1993	Système D: Released: 16 November 1993; Labels: Delabel	7	–	–
2000	Cool Frénésie: Released: 7 March 2000; Labels: Delabel	3	–	70
2002	La Femme Trombone: Released: 1 September 2002; Labels: Virgin Records SA	5	–	39
2007	Variéty: Released: 16 April 2007; Labels: Wagram, Because Music, WEA International	3	16	36

=== Compilation albums ===
Year	Album information	Chart positions		
Year	Album information	FR	BEL	SWI
1990	Re (Remix album): Released: 10 October 1990; Labels: Virgin Records SA	2	–	–
2001	Bestov: Released: 5 November 2001; Labels: Delabel	7	34	83
2004	Essentiel: Released: 11 May 2004; Labels: Virgin, EMI	19	–	–

=== Live albums ===
Year	Album information	Chart positions		
Year	Album information	FR	BEL	SWI
1996	Acoustiques (Live from an M6 televised concert): Released: 27 October 1996; Labels: Delabel	18	–	–
2004	En concert avec l'Orchestre Lamoureux (as 'Les Rita Mitsouko avec L'Orchestre Lamoureux'): Released: March 2004; Labels: Virgin Records SA	64	–	–
2008	Chante Les Rita Mitsouko and more à la Cigalle (Credited to Catherine Ringer): Released: 28 November 2008; Labels: Because Music	35	–	–

=== Extended plays ===
- The Eye, More Variety (2007, Because Music)
- Variety Remixes (2007, Because Music)

=== Singles ===
Year	Title	Chart positions			Album
Year	Title	FR	BEL	U.S. Dance	Album
1982	"Minuit Dansant"	–	–	–	—
1982	"Don't Forget the Nite"	–	–	–	—
1984	"Restez Avec Moi"	–	–	–	Rita Mitsouko
1985	"Marcia Baïla"	2	–	27	Rita Mitsouko
1986	"Andy" / "Un Soir, Un Chien"	19	–	11	The No Comprendo
1986	"C'est Comme Ça"	10	–	–	The No Comprendo
1987	"Les Histoires D'a"	46	–	–	The No Comprendo
1988	"Mandolino City"	82	–	–	Marc & Robert
1989	"Singing in the Shower" (with Sparks)	37	–	24	Marc & Robert
1989	"Le Petit Train"	70	–	–	Marc & Robert
1989	"Tongue Dance"	–	–	–	Marc & Robert
1990	"Hip Kit" (William Orbit Remix)	–	–	–	Re
1991	"Don't Forget the Nite" (Re-recording)	81	–	–	Re
1993	"Y'a D'la Haine!"	33	–	–	Système D
1994	"Les Amants"	–	–	–	Système D
1994	"Femme D'affaires"	75	–	–	Système D
1996	"Riche" (with Doc Gynéco)	–	–	–	Acoustiques
2000	"Cool Frénésie"	98	–	–	Cool Frénésie
2000	"Alors C'est Quoi"	45	–	–	Cool Frénésie
2000	"Femme de Moyen-Age"	–	–	–	Cool Frénésie
2002	"Triton"	35	–	–	La Femme Trombone
2002	"Sacha"	–	–	–	La Femme Trombone
2003	"Tu Me Manques"	–	–	–	La Femme Trombone
2007	"Communiqueur D'amour"	68	–	–	Variéty
2007	"Ding Ding Dong (Ringing at Your Bell)"	34	28	–	Variéty
2007	"Même Si"	–	21	–	Variéty
2007	"L'Ami Ennemi"	72	–	–	Variéty

=== Videos ===
- 8 Clips Et 2 Films (1995)

=== Music videos ===
Year	Title	Director
1985	"Marcia Baïla"	Philippe Gautier
1986	"Andy"	Philippe Gautier
1987	"C'est Comme Ça"	Jean-Baptiste Mondino
1987	"Les Histoires D'a"	
1989	"Singing in the Shower"	Tim Pope
1989	"Le Petit Train"	Jean Achache
1990	"Hip Kit" (William Orbit Remix)	Hiroyuki Nakano
1993	"Y'a D'la Haine!"	Sébastien Chantrel
1994	"Les Amants"	Jean-Baptiste Mondino
2000	"Cool Frénésie"	
2002	"Triton"	
2007	"Ding Ding Dong (Ringing at Your Bell)"	

== Awards ==
- 1987 : Grand Prix of the Charles-Cros Academy
- 1987 : Victoires De La Musique: "Best Album of the Year" for The no comprendo
- 1987 : Victoires De La Musique: "Best Video of the Year" for "C'est comme ça"
- 1990 : Prix Val Rock, for the video "Le Petit Train"
- 1990 : Bus d'Acier of the decade for their collected work
- 1994 : MTV Europe Music Awards: "Best video of the Year" for "Y'a d'la haine"
- 2001 : Prix Roger-Seiller for "Best French Band" (SACEM Prix de Printemps)
