= Night Flight from Moscow =

1973 film by Henri Verneuil

- French theatrical release poster
- French: Le Serpent
- Directed by: Henri Verneuil
- Screenplay by: Gilles Perrault; Henri Verneuil
- Based on: Le 13e suicidé by Pierre Nord
- Produced by: Henri Verneuil
- Starring: Yul Brynner; Henry Fonda; Dirk Bogarde; Philippe Noiret; Michel Bouquet; Virna Lisi; Guy Tréjan; Elga Andersen; Marie Dubois; Farley Granger
- Cinematography: Claude Renoir
- Edited by: Pierre Gillette
- Music by: Ennio Morricone
- Production companies: Les Films de la Boétie; Euro International Films; Rialto Film
- Distributed by: Cinema International Corporation (France); Euro International Films (Italy); Tobis Film (West Germany)
- Release dates: 5 April 1973 (France); 13 April 1973 (West Germany); 18 May 1973 (Italy)
- Running time: 113 minutes
- Countries: France; Italy; West Germany
- Languages: English; French; German

Night Flight from Moscow (French: Le Serpent), also known as The Serpent, is a 1973 Cold War spy thriller film produced, co-written and directed by Henri Verneuil and starring Yul Brynner, Henry Fonda, Dirk Bogarde, Philippe Noiret and Michel Bouquet. The score was composed by Ennio Morricone.

== Plot ==
Aleksey Teodorovic Vlassov, a high-ranking KGB official who defects while he is in France, possesses highly classified information as part of a deal with Western intelligence for his arrival in the United States. The debriefing is held at Langley by DCI Allan Davies and MI6 representative Philip Boyle. Vlassov hands a list that he has of enemy agents in Western Europe, including a deep penetration into NATO.

Davies wants to begin operations to arrest the agents, but those on the list suddenly begin to die off. The CIA also has suspicions over the authenticity of Vlassov's claims. The CIA discovers that a defection photo of Vlassov had been taken in the Soviet Union, not in Turkey, because of the contours of Mount Ararat in the background. Vlassov outsmarted a lie detector test of the CIA by telling a minor lie to cover his real intentions.

== Cast ==
- Yul Brynner as Aleksey Teodorovic Vlassov
- Henry Fonda as Allan Davies
- Dirk Bogarde as Philip Boyle
- Philippe Noiret as Lucien Berthon
- Michel Bouquet as Tavel
- Guy Tréjan as Robert Deval
- Martin Held as Lepke
- Virna Lisi as Annabel Lee
- Paola Pitagora as Jeannine Santelli
- Elga Andersen as Kate Cross
- Marie Dubois as Suzanne
- Nathalie Nerval as Tatiana Vlassov
- Farley Granger as computer programming director
- Luigi Diberti as Lefevre
- Robert Alda as man interrogated by Tavel

== Reception ==
The film received mixed reviews. Time Out called it "a very traditional spy fable" and stated, "The only thing that sets this film apart is the totally consistent layer of impenetrable gloss with which Verneuil covers it, and his general directorial tricksiness, which runs the gamut from the irrelevant to the pretentious and back." TV Guide described it as "a solid international espionage tale", and added, "This is a gritty, tightly directed look at international intrigue, and the performances are all finely tuned. Particularly effective is Bogarde who offers a insightful portrait of a cool, calculating agent."

A contemporary review by Tony Mastroianni in the Cleveland Press stated that the film demonstrated how in 1973, the computer had replaced the dagger in espionage. The reviewer also concluded the film had "more good moments than bad".
