= Aram (film) =

- Aram Theatrical Poster
- Directed by: Robert Kechichian
- Written by: Robert Kechichian
- Produced by: Jean-Philippe Andraca; Christian Bérard
- Starring: Simon Abkarian; Lubna Azabal; Mathieu Demy
- Edited by: Juliette Welfling; Marie-Pierre Frappier
- Distributed by: BAC Films
- Release date: November 27, 2002
- Running time: 87 min.
- Country: France
- Languages: French; Armenian

Aram is a 2002 French action drama film written and directed by Robert Kechichian. The film is set primarily in France between 1993 and 2001 around Aram, a young French-Armenian militant attempting to supply arms to Nagorno-Karabakh and dealing with the aftermath of assassinating a Turkish general. Aram was released in 2002 in theatres in France, and made its American debut in 2004 at the Armenian Film Festival in San Francisco.

== Plot ==
Aram Sarkissian (Simon Abkarian) is a young French-Armenian member of AGJSA, an Armenian militant organization, who leaves his family in Paris to fight in the First Nagorno-Karabakh War. In October 1993, Aram returns to France to live a "normal life" again, but finds his younger brother Levon (Mathieu Demy) preparing the assassination of Azbalan Djelik, a general of the Turkish Army visiting France. Aram opposes the assassination, claiming the Armenian struggle lies in Nagorno-Karabakh, however, Levon considers Aram to be a coward, who then reluctantly agrees. One evening, General Djelik is killed when his car is ambushed by 3 masked gunmen, who kill three passengers. The survivor, Djelik's aide-de-camp Colonel Talaat Sonlez (Serge Avédikian), shoots Levon after he pretended to be dead. Levon is immobilized and enters a coma, and Sonlez is shot by the Armenians before they flee. AGJSA claims responsibility for the attack, justifying it as General Djelik was a high-ranking member of the Black Wolves, a Turkish ultranationalist organization. Talaat survives again, and searches for the assassins by asking Monsieur Paul (Gilles Arbona), a French counter-terrorism policeman monitoring the activities of AGJSA, who does not reveal their identities.

By January, 2001, Levon is paralyzed and reliant on a wheelchair. Their father, Mihran Sarkissian (Alan Motte), is bitter and blames Levon's disabilities on Aram, who has not been seen by the family since the attack. Additionally, their younger sister Meline (Ljubna Azabal) becomes engaged to Stephan, a French man, which their father approves reluctantly and is frowned upon by his friends. Meanwhile, in Germany, the leader of the AGJSA, Vartan, negotiates an arms deal with Kurdish militants to buy a large shipment sniper rifles to be used by Armenians in Nagorno-Karabakh. The Kurds are represented by Midzametin, the head of the PKK in Europe, and his right-hand man Djalal, who is vocally against the deal. The Kurds change their deal, offering cheaper guns in exchange for support in assassinating Turkish diplomats if the Turkish Army launches a new offensive against the PKK, which Vartan accepts. Aram arrives back in France through Calais after returning from hiding in Karabakh, where he is photographed by Virgil, an agent of Paul. Aram reveals his reservations over Vartan's promises to the Kurds supporting assassinations of Turkish diplomats, believing they are ineffective and undesirable for the Armenian cause. En route to the weapons exchange Talaat and Djalal, who is working for the Turks, ambush the Kurds, and later shoot at the Armenians waiting the meeting point on a beach at night. Aram is wounded but kills Djalal without realizing his identity before escaping. Unaware of Djalal's betrayal, Aram first suspects Kervedjian, a diplomat of the Nagorono-Karabakh Republic in Paris, who he abducts and interrogates. Paul, knowing of Talaat's involvement, visits him at a Turkish bath and reminds him he was told in 1993 not to come back to France. Talaat states he is an attaché of the Turkish government as part of an official diplomatic mission, but Paul reveals his knowledge that Talaat is a member of the Black Wolves and is involved in the Turkish Mafia. Aram seeks the help of his friend, Fodil Boushaour, who provides him with handguns, a car, a fake driver's license, and backup from his friends, Saad and Mamad. In Paris, Mihran and Meline argue over Aram, with Mihran expressing his bitterness towards him, while Meline shows her sympathy. Kervedjian informs Aram of Djalal's betrayal and cooperation with the Turkish government, and that there is a new deal with the Kurds to deliver weapons. Aram is assigned to task of killing the Turks involved in the betrayal and to escort the new weapons to Karabakh. Aram tracks down Talaat and kills several of his men and his girlfriend, but fails to kill him and his aide Mehmet - furious, Talaat instructs Mehmet to find Aram and kill him. Meline invites Aram to her wedding in an attempt to reconcile with their father, while Kervedjian provides Aram details to collect the Kurdish weapons at the port in Dunkirk, and to escort the weapons to Karabakh via Athens.

Talaat meets with Paul and Virgil, offering information terrorist networks in exchange for the identity of the person trying to kill him. Paul declines the offer, but later Mehmet and his gang abduct Virgil. Aram visits his family in Paris where his father asks him to leave, striking him with his cane, and Aram leaves without explaining his side of the story. Upon leaving, Aram is chased by Paul and another agent who have been tracking him to positively identify him, as Aram was officially killed in action in Karabakh, but he manages to escape. At the counter-terrorism office, Paul receives a package from Talaat containing an amputated finger of Virgil, and he calls the Turkish embassy revealing the identities of Aram and his associates. Paul speaks privately with Fodil, who claims that the last he heard from Aram was 7 years ago, and that he is buried in Shahumian in Karabakh. Despite this, Paul informs Fodil that Talaat now knows about Aram's identity and is hunting him. Fodil warns Aram, who is riding with Saad and Mamad on the way to the party after Meline and Stephan's marriage. Talaat and Mehmet appear at the party, and the two ambush Mihran and Levon in the restroom, but Aram shoots Talaat and Mehmet. Aram rushes to Dunkirk to leave France to avoid murder charges, but cars of the secret police with Paul and Mihran pull up. Aram and his father say goodbye without words, quietly redeeming his son. Instead of arresting Aram, Paul asks him to leave and to never return to France.

== Cast ==
- Simon Abkarian - Aram Sarkissian
- Lubna Azabal - Méliné Sarkissian
- Serge Avédikian - Talaat Sonlez
- Alain Mottet - Miran Sarkissian
- Mathieu Demy - Lévon Sarkissian
- Gilles Arbona - Monsieur Paul
- Isabelle Sadoyan - Aunt Anouche
- Olivier Loustau - Mehmet
- Marc Samuel - Vartan Madarian
- Jean-Yves Chatelais - Lawyer Kavedjian
- Fabio Zenoni - Virgil
- Samir Guesmi - Saad
- Albert Delpy - Nasar

== Background ==
Aram is loosely based on Armenian nationalist militant activity committed by youth from the Armenian diaspora in mostly Western Europe and North America in the 1970s to the 1990s. The AGJSA is based on Armenian radical militant groups, the most notable being the Justice Commandos of the Armenian Genocide, that attacked representatives of the Republic of Turkey with the primary goal of official Turkish recognition of the Armenian genocide. The Black Wolves, the Turkish neo-fascist organization of which General Djelik and Talaat Sonlez are members, is a reference to the Grey Wolves, a Turkish ultranationalist organization with ties to the Turkish mafia, counter-insurgency movements within Turkey, and extrajudicial repression of the ASALA and the PKK. Talaat, the name of the lead Turkish character, is most likely a reference to Talaat Pasha, a leader in the Young Turk government and Minister of the Interior of the Ottoman Empire, often considered to be the key architect of the Armenian Genocide.

== DVD release ==
The American debut of Aram featured English subtitles, there is no DVD being sold which contains English subtitles.
