= 588 rue paradis =

- Directed by: Henri Verneuil
- Written by: Henri Verneuil
- Produced by: Mark Lombardo; Tarak Ben Ammar
- Starring: Richard Berry; Claudia Cardinale; Omar Sharif
- Cinematography: Edmond Richard
- Edited by: Henri Lanoe
- Music by: Jean-Claude Petit
- Production companies: Carthago Films; V Films; Quinta Communications; TF1; TF1 Films Production; Les Productions Artistes Associés; Centre national la cinématographie
- Distributed by: AMLF
- Release date: 1992
- Running time: 130 minutes
- Country: France
- Language: French
- Box office: $3.5 million

588 rue paradis is a 1992 French semi-autobiographical film written and directed by French-Armenian filmmaker Henri Verneuil. The film's principal cast includes Richard Berry, Claudia Cardinale and Omar Sharif. It was preceded by Mayrig, the first autobiographical movie of Henri Verneuil.

== Cast ==
- Richard Berry ... Pierre Zakar (Azad Zakarian)
- Omar Sharif ... Hagop, Pierre's father
- Claudia Cardinale ... Araxi (Mayrig) - Pierre's mother
- Nathalie Roussel ... Gayane, Pierre's aunt
- Zabou Breitman ... Astrid Sétian
- Diane Bellego ... Carole
- Jacques Villeret ... Alexandre
- Danièle Lebrun ... Alexandre's mother
- Sylvie Joly ... Georgette Sylva
- Isabelle Sadoyan ... Anna
- Ginette Garcin
- Jacky Nercessian
