= Catherine Ringer =

French singer and musician (1957–2026)

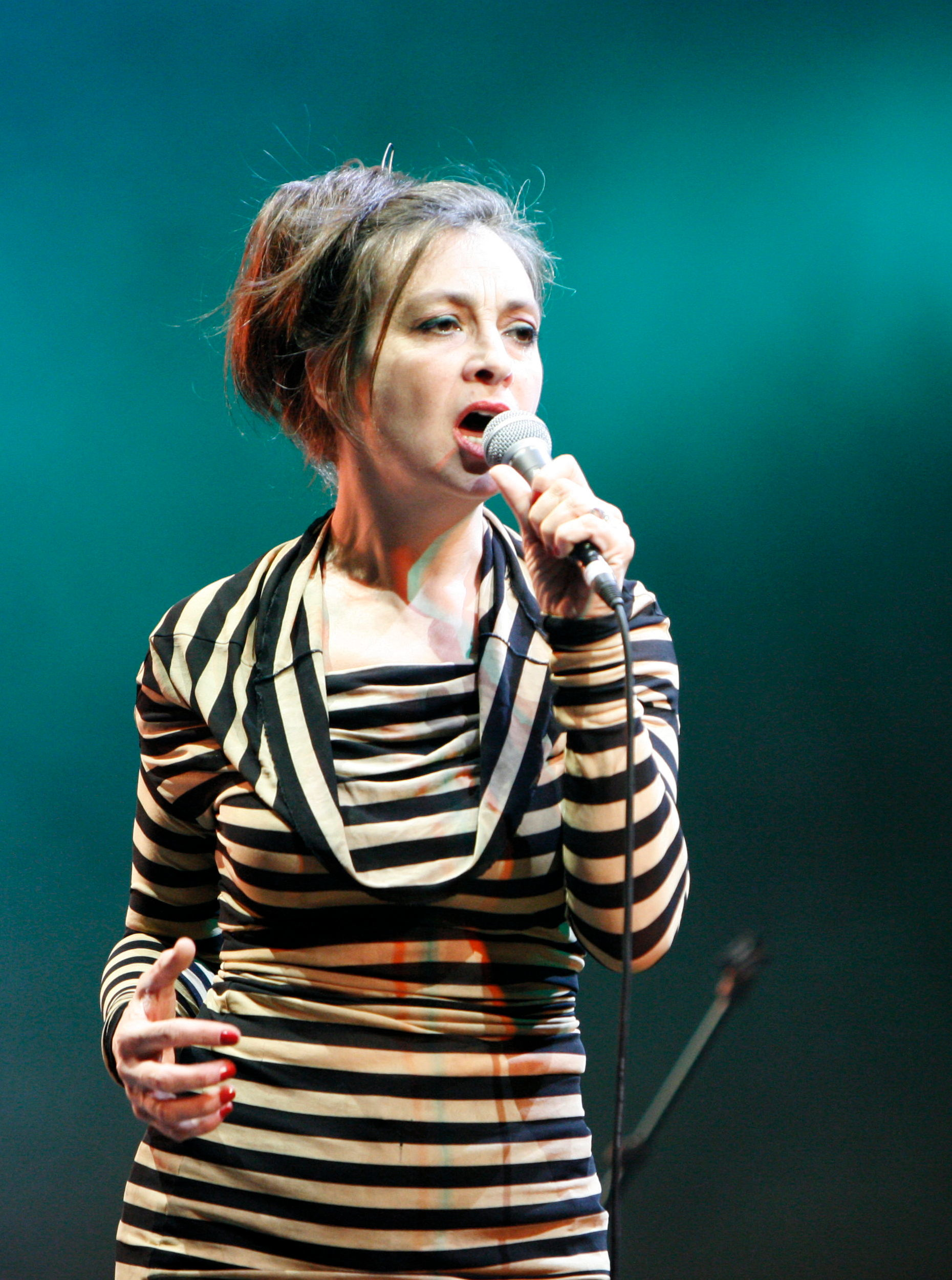
- Ringer performing, 2007

Background information
- Born: 18 October 1957; Suresnes, France
- Died: 14 September 2026 (aged 68) Paris, France
- Genres: New wave; pop rock; alternative rock; chanson
- Occupations: Singer-songwriter; composer; multi-instrumentalist; dancer; choreographer; actress
- Instruments: Vocals; keyboards; guitar
- Formerly of: Les Rita Mitsouko; Plaza Francia Orchestra
- Website: lesritamitsouko.com

Catherine Ringer (French: [katʁin ʁɛ̃ʒe]; 18 October 1957 – 14 September 2026) was a French singer, songwriter, composer, multi-instrumentalist, dancer, choreographer, actress, pornographic performer, and co-founder of the pop rock group Les Rita Mitsouko. She was the daughter of French artist Sam Ringer. She was also the lead vocalist for Plaza Francia Orchestra where she performed with Eduardo Makaroff and Christoph H. Müller, formerly of Gotan Project.

== Life and career ==
Ringer started her professional career on stage in the late 1970s in productions with Michael Lonsdale's Théâtre de Recherche Musicale as well as musical and dance productions. In 1976, she met the Argentine dancer and choreographer Marcia Moretto with whom she studied and also performed in various venues in Paris. The hit song "Marcia Baïla" was written as a tribute to Moretto after her death in 1981.

In 1979, she met Fred Chichin with whom she founded and co-led the music group Les Rita Mitsouko. Ringer continued leading the group after Chichin's death in November 2007.

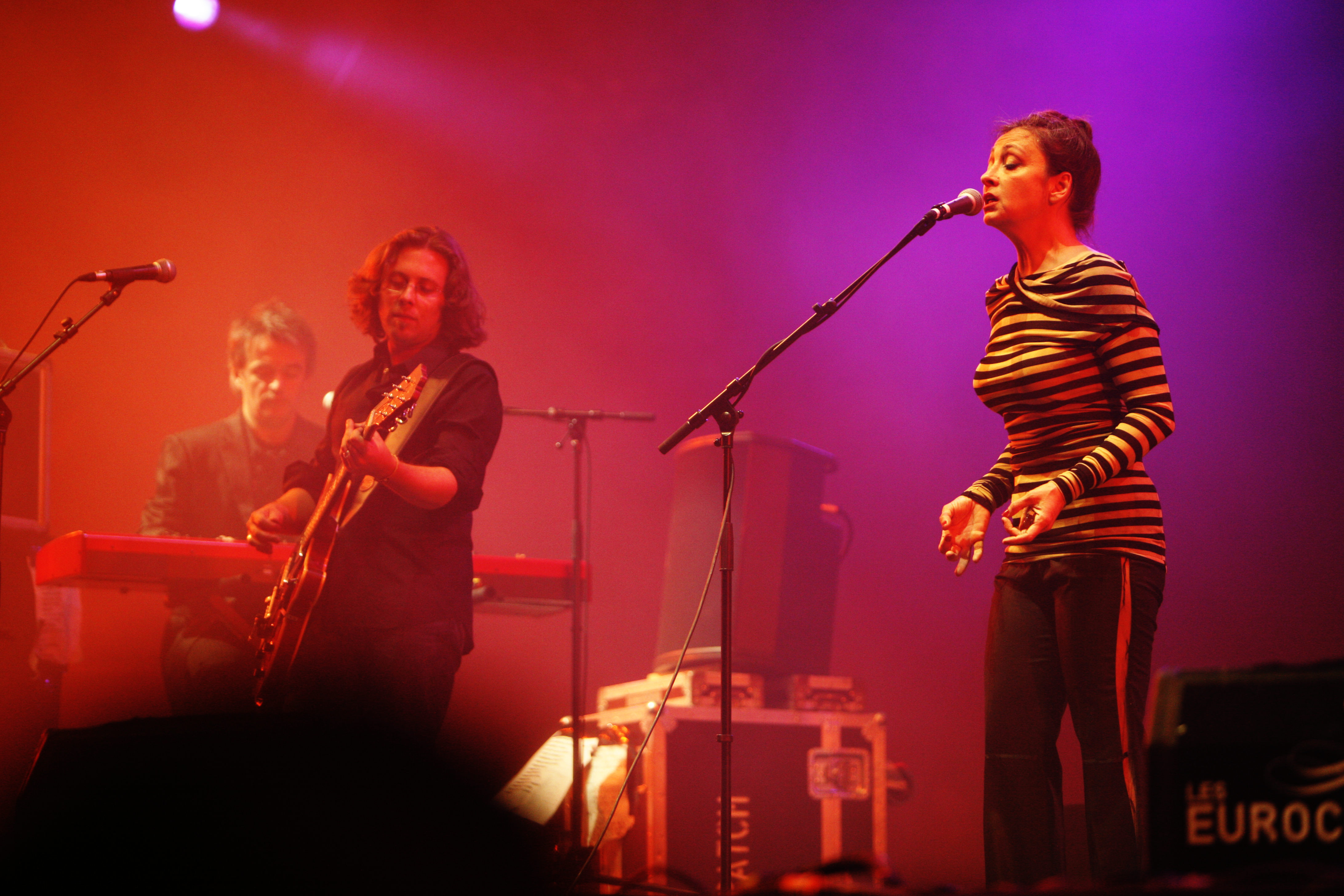
Catherine Ringer in 2007

Following the release of the 2010 Gotan Project album Tango 3.0, Ringer teamed up with members Eduardo Makaroff and Christoph H. Müller to create Plaza Francia, now known as Plaza Francia Orchestra for their 7 April 2014 release A New Tango Song Book. The album was met with critical acclaim and was a commercial success in France and Belgium.

Ringer died in Paris on 14 September 2026, at the age of 68, from cancer.

== Discography ==
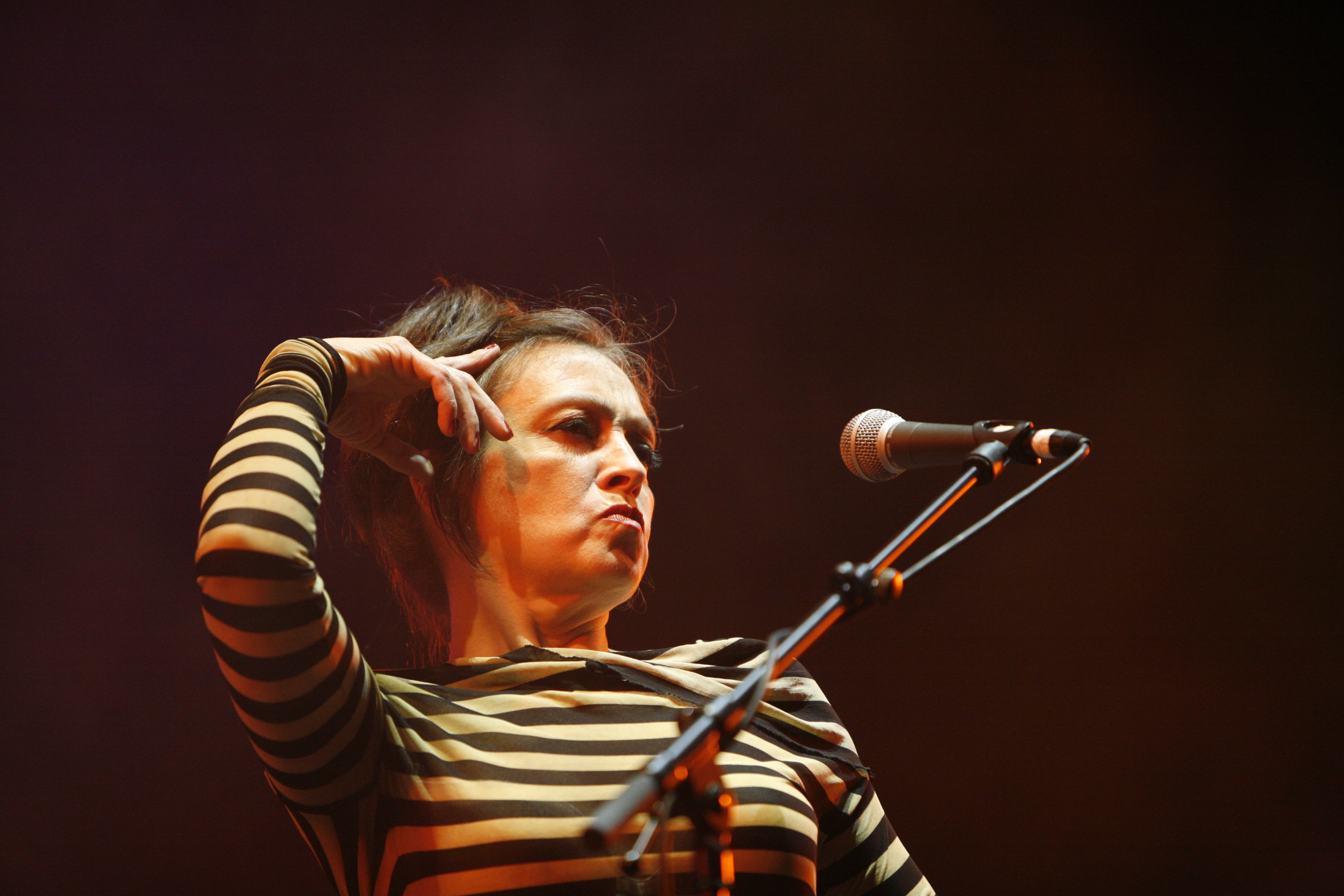
Ringer performing live at the Eurockéennes, 2007

=== Solo career ===
==== Albums ====
- 2011: Ring n' Roll
- 2014: A New Tango Song Book (with Plaza Francia)
- 2017: Chroniques et Fantaisies

==== Singles ====
- 1988: Qu’est-Ce Que T’es Belle (featuring Marc Lavoine)
- 1997: Eso es el amor
- 1998: Doux Daddy
- 2008: Parle plus bas (featuring Mauro Gioia)
- 2010: Les Bohémiens
- 2010: L'Adèle
- 2011: Quel est ton nom
- 2011: Pardon
- 2011: Vive l'amour
- 2012: Prends-moi
- 2012: Punk 103
- 2014: La Mano Encima (with Plaza Francia)
- 2014: Secreto (with Plaza Francia)
- 2014: Idées noires (featuring Bernard Lavilliers)

==== Joint/collaborative singles ====
- 1995: "Peut-être ce soir" (from the album Roots by Coba)
- 1998: "Rendez-Vous" (from the album Conscious Posi by Coba)
- 1998: "Sa raison d'être" (from the album Ensemble, AIDS charity)
- 1998: "Paranoïa" (from the album Les Liaisons Dangereuses by Doc Gyneco)
- 2002: "Tawes" (from the album "Uni-vers-elles" by Djura)
- 2004: "La bohême" duo with Corneille (CD and DVD)
- 2005: "Maudie" (from the album "Le Pavillon Des Fous" de Thomas Fersen)
- 2008: "Parle plus bas" (with Mauro Gioia) (2008)

=== With Les Rita Mitsouko ===
==== Albums ====
- 1984: Rita Mitsouko
- 1986: The No Comprendo
- 1988: Marc & Robert
- 1990: Re (Compilation)
- 1993: Système D
- 1996: Acoustiques (Live)
- 2000: Cool Frénésie
- 2001: Le Bestov (Compilation)
- 2002: La Femme Trombone
- 2004: Essentiel (Compilation)
- 2004: En concert avec l'Orchestre Lamoureux (Live)
- 2007: Variety

=== With Plaza Francia Orchestra ===
- 2014: A New Tango Song Book
- 2018: Plaza Francia Orchestra

==== Soundtracks for films ====
- 1985: Vagabond
- 1986: Nuit d'ivresse
- 1987: Keep Your Right Up
- 1988: Kung Fu Master
- 1988: 36 Fillette
- 1989: Slaves of New York
- 1990: Tatie Danielle
- 1991: Les Amants du Pont-Neuf
- 1993: My Favorite Season
- 1995: The Three Brothers
- 1995: The Apprentices
- 1997: Le cousin
- 1997: Sinon, oui
- 1998: Un grand cri d'amour
- 1998: White Lies
- 1999: Belle maman
- 2001: The Pornographer
- 2001: A Hell of a Day
- 2005: L'anniversaire
- 2007: The Witnesses
- 2007: La tête de maman
- 2009: Korkoro
- 2010: The Extraordinary Adventures of Adèle Blanc-Sec
- 2022: Les Cadors

== Filmography ==
- 1969: Les Deux Coquines (Kiki)
- 1976: La Fessée (Marcelle) by Burd Tranbaree
- 1976: Corps brûlants (uncredited) by Bart Caral
- 1977: Body Love (Martine) by Lasse Braun
- 1977: Love Inferno (Monique) by Lasse Braun
- 1978: Color Climax Special 257
- 1979: Poker Partouze by Joe de Palmer
- 1979: Histoires de cul by Michel Ricaud
- 1979: Paradise by Pierre B. Reinhard
- 1980: Petits trous libertins by Pierre B. Reinhard
- 1981: Mélodie pour Manuella by Joë de Palmer
- 1981: L'Éducation d'Orphelie by Michel Ricaud
- 1981: Lingeries intimes (La veuve) by Jean-Claude Roy
- 1981: Quella porcacciona di mia moglie (Angela) by Lorenzo Onorati
- 1981: Lea by Lorenzo Onorati
- 1981: Provinciales en chaleur (Julie) by Jean-Claude Roy
- 1981: Innocence impudique by Jean-Claude Roy
- 1981: Gorges profondes et petites filles by Hubert Géral
- 1981: Marathon Love by Andrei Feher
- 1982: L'Inconnue by Alain Payet
- 1983: Les Boulugres by Jean Hurtado
- 1987: Soigne ta droite by Jean-Luc Godard
- 2000: La Dame pipi by Jacques Richard
- 2022: La fille au coeur de cochon (TV Series – 1 episode)
- 2023: Capitaine Marleau (TV Series – 1 episode)
- 2025: Aimer perdre by Harpo Guit & Lenny Guit
