= Piaf (film) =

1974 film

- Directed by: Guy Casaril
- Written by: Simone Berteaut (biography); Marc Behm; Guy Casaril; Françoise Ferley
- Produced by: Cy Feuer; Léopold Wyler
- Starring: Brigitte Ariel; Pascale Christophe; Guy Tréjan
- Cinematography: Edmond Séchan
- Edited by: Louisette Hautecoeur; Henri Taverna
- Music by: Ralph Burns
- Production companies: Les Films Feuer and Martin
- Distributed by: AMLF
- Release date: 10 April 1974
- Running time: 98 minutes
- Country: France
- Language: French

Piaf is a 1974 French musical biographical film directed by Guy Casaril and starring Brigitte Ariel, Pascale Christophe and Guy Tréjan. It is based on the early career of the singer Edith Piaf.

The film's sets were designed by the art director François de Lamothe.

== Cast ==
- Brigitte Ariel as Edith Gassion, dite Edith Piaf
- Pascale Christophe as Momone
- Guy Tréjan as Louis Leplée
- Pierre Vernier as Raymond Asso
- Jacques Duby as Julien
- Anouk Ferjac as Madeleine
- Sylvie Joly as Lulu
- Yvan Varco as Félix
- Michel Bedetti as Constantini
- François Dyrek as Henri

== Bibliography ==
- Richard B. Armstrong & Mary Willems Armstrong. Encyclopedia of Film Themes, Settings and Series. McFarland, 2009.
- David Looseley. Édith Piaf: A Cultural History. Oxford University Press, 2016.
