= Marc & Robert =

Studio album by Les Rita Mitsouko
- Released: November 7, 1988
- Recorded: Studio Davout, Paris; Studio Good Earth, London
- Genre: New wave, pop rock, synthpop
- Length: 38:53; 43:12 (with bonus track)
- Label: Virgin LP 70635
- Producer: Tony Visconti, Les Rita Mitsouko

Les Rita Mitsouko chronology
The No Comprendo (1986)	Marc & Robert (1988)	Re (1990)

Singles from Marc & Robert
- 1. "Mandolino City" b/w "Smog" Released: November 1, 1988; 2. "Singing in the Shower" b/w "Harpie and Harpo" Released: November 29, 1988; 3. "Le Petit Train" b/w "Petite Fille Princesse" Released: 1989; 4. "Tongue Dance" b/w "Perfect Eyes" Released: August 1989

Marc & Robert is the third studio album by French pop rock group Les Rita Mitsouko. It was released in 1988 and reached number thirty-five on the French Albums Chart. Marc & Robert includes the singles "Mandolino City", "Singing in the Shower", "Le Petit Train" and "Tongue Dance".

The album was recorded and mixed with veteran producer Tony Visconti at Studio Good Earth, London and Studio Davout, Paris. Receiving mixed reviews the album was originally released as an LP, Cassette and CD in November 1988. CD editions include a bonus track. The artwork was designed by Fabrice Pernisco with photography by Luc Choquer.

== Recording ==
The album marked the group's second collaboration with Tony Visconti after working together on The No Comprendo. The entire album was remixed by Jesse Johnson, though only his mixes of "Tongue Dance", "Singing in the Shower", and "Live in Las Vegas" were used. In an effort to appeal to Anglophone audiences the group collaborated with the American duo Sparks. Brothers Ron Mael and Russell Mael contributed and performed on "Singing in the Shower" and "Live in Las Vegas". Russell Mael also appeared on the Les Rita Mitsouko composition and album opener "Hip Kit".

== Music and themes ==
Marc & Robert displays a notable shift into a greater electronic emphasis, with sequencers and keyboards driving tracks while acoustic instruments are often absent.

The album features a mixture of songs with lyrical themes that range from light in tone ("Singing in the Shower") to more reflective and bitter-sweet. The single "Le Petit Train" (English translation: "The little train") is an example of a song that reflects the dual nature of the lyrics. The song is opens musically and lyrically in a light tone with an almost childish melody. As the song progresses, the lyrical themes turn to serious references such as the use of trains in the deportation of Ethnic minorities and political prisoners during the Holocaust. The music video directed by Jean Achache, conveys the song's disjointed tones by shifting between increasingly oppressive scenes often backed by fencing reminiscent of a concentration camp and a playful Bollywood homage that makes up the lighter sections.

== Singles ==
"Mandolino City" was released as the first single in France and Germany. It was backed with the album track "Smog". "Singing in the Shower" was released as the second single and the first in UK and US. French versions were backed with the album track "Harpie and Harpo", the UK release included "Smog" most likely because of its English lyric. CD and twelve inch versions in France and internationally featured the Jesse Johnson remix of "Hip Kit". "Le Petit Train" was released as the third single in France. It was backed with the album-track "Petite Fille Princesse". "Tongue Dance" was remixed by William Orbit and Mark Moore and released as the second UK single, the French release followed almost a year later in 1990. The single was backed with the album-track "Perfect Eyes". "Hip Kit" was remixed by William Orbit and released as a single in late 1990 to promote the group's remix album Re.

"Singing in the Shower" was the album's most successful single peaking at #37 on the French Singles Chart and #24 on the US Hot Dance Club Play chart None of the other three singles charted.

== Reception ==
Professional ratings
Review scores
Source	Rating
Allmusic	2.5/5 stars
Q	4/5 stars

Marc & Robert received mixed reviews from the majority of critics.

== Track listing ==
All tracks are written by Fred Chichin and Catherine Ringer; except where noted

Side one
No.	Title	Writer(s)	Length
1.	"Hip Kit" (with Sparks)		4:57
2.	"Smog"		3:05
3.	"Mandolino City"	Chichin (music), Jean-Baptiste Mondino (music), Ringer (music and lyrics)	2:12
4.	"Le Petit Train"	Chichin, Marc Fontenoy, Ringer	5:47
5.	"Perfect Eyes"	Philippe Glémée, Ringer	3:35

Side two
No.	Title	Writer(s)	Length
6.	"Tongue Dance"		4:44
7.	"Singing in the Shower" (with Sparks)	Ron Mael, Russell Mael	4:23
8.	"Petite Fille Princesse"		3:24
9.	"Harpie and Harpo"		2:54
10.	"Ailleurs"		3:50
11.	"Live in Las Vegas" (with Sparks) (CD bonus track)	Ron Mael, Russell Mael	4:19

== Personnel ==
Unlike Les Rita Mitsouko's previous two releases, the musician credits do not list all of Fred Chichin and Catherine Ringer's contributions. Instead a selective recounting of their roles are listed.

Musicians

- Fred Chichin - Vocals ("Smog"), Drums ("Smog"), Rhythm Programming ("Singing in the Shower" and "Live in Las Vegas"), Trumpet ("Harpie and Harpo")
- Catherine Ringer - Vocals, Bass ("Harpie and Harpo")
- Ginger - Vocals ("Hip Kit")
- Russell Mael - Vocals ("Hip Kit", "Singing in the Shower" and "Live in Las Vegas")
- Sam Smith - Guitar Solo ("Hip Kit"), Slide Guitar ("Smog")
- Tony Visconti - Bass ("Smog"), Rhythm Programming ("Singing in the Shower" and "Live in Las Vegas"), Saxophone ("Harpie and Harpo")
- J.B. Mondino - Rhythm Guitar ("Mandolino City")
- Gilbert Monin - Bass ("Tongue Dance")
- Jesse Johnson - Drums ("Tongue Dance"), Rhythm Programming ("Singing in the Shower" and "Live in Las Vegas"), Guitar Solo ("Live in Las Vegas")
- Guy Barker - Trumpet ("Tongue Dance")
- Ron Mael - Keyboards ("Singing in the Shower" and "Live in Las Vegas")

Technical and visual

- Les Rita Mitsouko, Tony Visconti - Producer
- Tony Visconti - Engineering
- Pascal Garnon, Paul Cartledge, Sam Smith - Assistant Engineer
- Tony Visconti - Mixing (All tracks except "Tongue Dance", "Singing in the Shower" and "Live in Las Vegas")
- Catherine Ringer, Fred Chichin, Jesse Johnson - Mixing ("Tongue Dance", "Singing in the Shower" and "Live in Las Vegas")
- Peter Martensen - Mixing Engineer ("Tongue Dance", "Singing in the Shower" and "Live in Las Vegas")
- Gordon Vicary - Mastering
- Luc Choquer - Photography
- Fabrice Pernisco - Cover Design
