= Guy Tréjan =

French actor

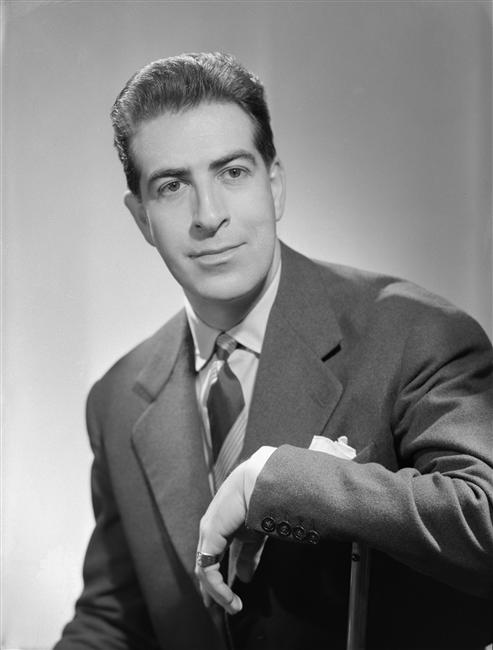
- Born: 18 September 1921; Paris, France
- Died: 25 January 2001 (aged 79); Paris, France
- Occupation: Actor
- Years active: 1954–2001 (film & TV)

Guy Tréjan (18 September 1921 – 25 January 2001) was a French film, stage and television actor. He was the nephew of the Swiss singer and dancer Flore Revalles.

== Selected filmography ==
- Marie Antoinette Queen of France (1956)
- I'll Get Back to Kandara (1956)
- Women's Club (1956)
- Escapade (1957)
- Checkerboard (1959)
- Twelve Hours By the Clock (1959)
- The Three Musketeers (1961)
- Heaven on One's Head (1965)
- Jo (1971)
- Night Flight from Moscow (1973)
- Piaf (1974)
- Conversation Piece (1974)
- La Bête (1975)
- Stranger in the House (1992)
- Fidelity (2000)
- The Officers' Ward (2001)

== Bibliography ==
- Bradby, David. Modern French Drama 1940-1990. Cambridge University Press, 1991.
