= Robert Kechichian =

- Born: 1946 (age 79–80)
- Occupations: film director, actor and screenwriter

Robert Kechichian (born 1946) is a French-Armenian film director, actor and screenwriter known for his work on Aram, Taxi 2 and other films.

== Filmography ==
Assistant director:

- Joyeuses Pâques (Georges Lautner)
- Maladie d'amour and Les Bois noirs (Jacques Deray)
- Beaumarchais, l'insolent (Édouard Molinaro)
- Asterix & Obelix: Mission Cleopatra (Alain Chabat)

Director:

- Brûlez Rome! (2005) (TV)
- Aram (2002)
