= Keep Your Right Up =

- Directed by: Jean-Luc Godard
- Written by: Jean-Luc Godard
- Produced by: Philippe de Chaisemartin
- Starring: Jacques Villeret; Jean-Luc Godard; Les Rita Mitsouko; François Périer; Dominique Lavanant; Éva Darlan; Rufus; Isabelle Sadoyan
- Cinematography: Caroline Champetier de Ribes
- Edited by: Jean-Luc Godard
- Music by: Francois Musy
- Distributed by: Gaumont Distribution
- Release date: 1987
- Running time: 82 minutes
- Countries: France; Switzerland
- Language: French

Keep Your Right Up (French: Soigne ta droite / Une place sur la terre) is a 1987 film, written, directed by, and starring French Swiss filmmaker Jean-Luc Godard.

In boxing, Soigne ta droite is a trainer's call to "keep your right up". The title is a reference to Jacques Tati's first short film, Soigne ton gauche (Keep Your Left Up).

== Plot ==
Described by Godard as "a fantasy for actor, camera and tape recorder", this film is made up of several sketches in which certain actors play several real or fictional roles to a background of rock music. The film is divided into three sections which inter-cross throughout. In each, a group of people search for their proper place on earth.

In the first, a group of musicians search for the right sound, the ideal harmony. In the second, a man searches for an ideal society and wonders if he is on the wrong planet. In the third, some travellers search for their destination, as Ulysses did in the bygone days.

== Production ==
Filming partially took place at the Nantes Atlantique Airport.

== Reception ==
On review aggregator website Rotten Tomatoes, the film holds an approval rating of 33% based on 6 reviews, with an average rating of 4.7/10.
