= Mayrig =

- Mayrig movie poster
- Directed by: Henri Verneuil
- Written by: Henri Verneuil
- Produced by: Tarak Ben Ammar; Mark Lombardo
- Starring: Claudia Cardinale; Omar Sharif; Nathalie Roussel
- Cinematography: Edmond Richard
- Edited by: Henri Lanoë
- Music by: Jean-Claude Petit
- Distributed by: AMLF
- Release date: 1991
- Running time: 157 minutes
- Country: France
- Language: French
- Box office: $6.3 million

Mayrig (Mother) is a 1991 semi-autobiographical film written and directed by French-Armenian filmmaker Henri Verneuil. The film's principal cast includes Claudia Cardinale and Omar Sharif as parents of Azad (Henri Verneuil depicted as child). Mayrig means mother in Armenian. The film is about the struggles of an Armenian family that emigrates to France from Turkey after the Armenian genocide of 1915.

For the film's main soundtrack, Verneuil used the traditional Armenian song "Dle Yaman".

Following the film's success, Verneuil edited the movie into a television series. He followed that up with 588 rue paradis, a sequel to the original movie.

== Synopsis ==
The film opens with the trial of Soghomon Tehlirian in Berlin for his 1921 Assassination of Talat Pasha, one of the plotters of the Armenian genocide. This introduces the viewer to the arrival of the Armenian Zakarian family, fleeing persecution in the Ottoman Empire to refuge in Marseilles, France.

The film recounts the biography of Azad Zakarian and his parents and aunts, taking us in a 20 year journey of the family facing tough times as refugees. This is based on the memories of Azad (actually Henri Verneuil himself) starting from a six-year-old kid with many flashbacks to the period of genocide in Turkey.

The story tells about difficulties of integrating in French society with hostile attitudes of the French towards the refugees (neighbour who refuse to give access to the common kitchen, prohibiting the family from cooking its food, the owner of the lodging blaming them for bringing bedbugs to the facility, heavy bullying of Azad in school, mocking of the Catholic priest of Azad's Armenian Christian beliefs, difficulty of finding work for the family members, language issues, etc.)

== Cast ==
- Claudia Cardinale : Araxi (Mayrig), Azad's mother
- Omar Sharif : Hagop, Azad's father
- Cédric Doucet : Azad Zakarian (7 years old)
- Tom Poncin : Azad Zakarian (12 years old)
- Stéphane Servais : Azad Zakarian (20 years old)
- Richard Berry : Azad Zakarian's voice (narrator)
- Nathalie Roussel : Gayane, Azad's aunt
- Isabelle Sadoyan : Anna, Azad's aunt
- Jacky Nercessian : Apkar, family friend
- Serge Avedikian : Vasken Papazian
- Michèle Bardollet : Madeleine
- Christian Barbier : Father Pignon
- Denis Podalydès : Soghomon Tehlirian
- Patrick Timsit : Garbis
- Ticky Holgado: Racist neighbour
- Jean-Pierre Delage : Dr. Philibert
- Nicolas Silberg : Lawyer
- Ève Ruggieri : Herself

== Awards and nominations ==
- Mayrig received a César Award nomination for Jean-Claude Petit's original score.
- Mayrig also won an Academy Award by the National Academy of Cinema, France, in 1991.

== In popular culture ==
Certain scenes of the film were used in the music video for "Chez nous (Plan d'Aou, Air Bel)" by French singer of Armenian descent Patrick Fiori with French singer of Comorian descent Soprano.
