= Marcia Baila =

"Marcia Baïla"

Single by Les Rita Mitsouko

from the album Rita Mitsouko
- B-side: "Jalousie"
- Released: April 1984
- Recorded: France, 1984
- Genre: Pop, new wave
- Length: 5:34
- Label: Virgin
- Songwriters: Catherine Ringer; Frédéric Chichin
- Producers: Conny Plank; Rita Mitsouko

Les Rita Mitsouko singles chronology
"Restez avec moi" (1984)	"Marcia Baïla" (1984)	"Andy" (1986)

Music video
- "Marcia Baila" on YouTube

"Marcia Baïla" is a 1984 song recorded by the French duo Les Rita Mitsouko. It was the band's third single from their first album, Rita Mitsouko, and was released in April 1984.

Dedicated to a dancer/ friend of the band who died in 1983, the song was a big hit in France and abroad, and is considered one of the band's signature songs.

== Background and writing ==
Composed by band members Catherine Ringer and Fred Chichin, the song is a tribute to Argentine dancer and choreographer Marcia Moretto, who participated in the band's tours before her death from breast cancer in 1983 at the age of 36.

With this song, Les Rita Mitsouko received extensive media coverage; indeed, "the music video for the single [was] a success which result[ed] in repeated and enthusiastic broadcastings on the television, the extravagance of the group express[ing] itself as well in concerts as during its cathodic performances."

Philippe Gautier directed the widely viewed music video that accompanies the song. Jean-Paul Gaultier and Thierry Mugler's costumes are featured in the video, as well as Xavier Veilhan's set design and graffiti art from the Figuration libre movement. Despite its Spanish title, the lyrics are in French.

== Chart performance ==
In France, the song had a long chart trajectory, remaining on the Top 50 charts for 29 weeks. It debuted at #33 on April 27, 1985, and climbed regularly until it peaked at #2 for three consecutive weeks. In all, it spent 17 weeks in the Top Ten.

== In the media and cover versions ==
The song can be heard in several films, including The Witnesses (produced by André Téchiné, 2007), La Tête de maman (Carine Tardieu, 2007), Le Pornographe (Bertrand Bonello, 2001), Belle Maman (Gabriel Aghion, 1999) and Sans toit ni loi (Agnès Varda, 1985).

The song is also a PAL region exclusive for Just Dance 3.

In 1997, the song was covered in Spanish by Los Del Sol. In 1998, Ricky Martin covered the song, also in Spanish, on his album Vuelve, on which it features as the 11th track. Christer Björkman also made a version of the song, released as a single in 2002. The French band Nouvelle Vague covered this song for their fourth album Couleurs sur Paris, released in 2010. It was played at 2024 Paris Olympics opening ceremony.

== Track listings ==
7" single

1. "Marcia Baïla" — 4:30
2. "Jalousie" — 3:40

12" maxi

1. "Marcia Baïla" — 5:34
2. "Jalousie" — 3:40
3. "Marcia Baïla" (Instrumental) — 6:15

U.K. 12" single

1. "Marcia Baïla (Extended Version)" — 7:21
2. "Marcia Baïla (Extended French Version)" — 5:55
3. "Marcia Baïla (7" English Version)" — 4:30

U.S. Sire Records 12" maxi

1. "Marcia Baïla (English Version)" — 7:21
2. "Marcia Baïla (French Version)" — 5:55
3. "Jalousie" — 3:40
4. "Marcia Baïla (Single Version)" — 4:09
5. "Marcia Baïla (Instrumental)" — 6:15

Canada 12" maxi

1. "Marcia Baïla (Extended Version)" — 7:21
2. "Andy (7" French Version)" — 4:15
3. "Marcia Baïla (Extended French Version)" — 5:10
4. "Andy (Extended French Version)" — 5:15

=== Remixes ===
Produced by Conny Plank and Les Rita Mitsouko

- Album Version — 5:35
- 7" Version — 4:30
- Extended French Version/French Version — 5:55 (remixed by Dominique Blanc-Francard)
- Instrumental — 6:15 (remixed by Dominique Blanc-Francard)
- Re album version (1990) (remixed by Tony Visconti and Les Rita Mitsouko)

Produced by Ivan Ivan

- Extended Version/English Version — 7:21
- 7" English Version — 4:30
- Single Version — 4:09

== Charts ==
Chart (1985)	Peak position
Eurochart Hot 100	13
French SNEP Singles Chart	2
Quebec (ADISQ)	41
US Billboard Hot Dance Club Play	27

== Certifications ==
Region	Certification	Certified units/sales
France (SNEP)	Gold	500,000^{*}
^{*} Sales figures based on certification alone.
