= Henri Verneuil =

French-Armenian director and screenwriter (1920–2002)

- Հանրի Վերնէօյ; Անրի Վեռնոյ
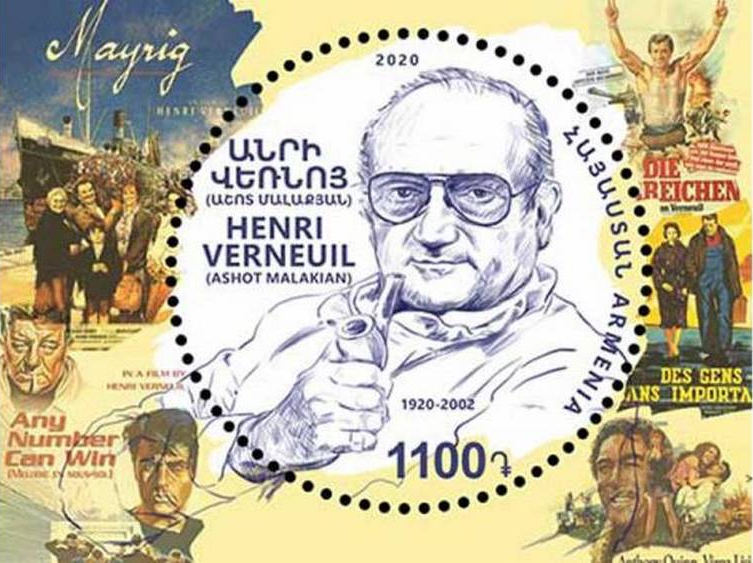
- Verneuil on a 2020 stamp of Armenia
- Born: Ashot Malakian; 15 October 1920; Rodosto, Ottoman Empire
- Died: 11 January 2002 (aged 81); Bagnolet, Seine-Saint-Denis, France
- Education: École Nationale d'Arts et Metiers
- Occupations: Filmmaker; screenwriter
- Years active: 1940s – 2000s
- Spouses: Françoise Bonnot (divorced); Veronique Sedro
- Children: 4
- Awards: Cannes Film Festival, Golden Palm 1964 Cent mille dollars au soleil Oscar Award (Nominated) 1956 Le Mouton à cinq pattes César Awards 1996; Golden Globe Award; 1961 Mélodie en sous-sol (1961)

Henri Verneuil (French: [ɑ̃ʁi vɛʁnœj]; Western Armenian: Հանրի Վերնէօյ; Armenian: Անրի Վեռնոյ; 15 October 1920 – 11 January 2002), born Ashot Malakian, was a French-Armenian filmmaker and screenwriter active in French and American cinema. Verneuil was nominated for Oscar and Palme d'Or awards, and won Locarno International Film Festival, Edgar Allan Poe Awards, French Legion of Honor, Golden Globe Award, French National Academy of Cinema and Honorary Cesar awards.

== Life and career ==
=== Early life ===
Verneuil was born Ashot Malakian (Western Armenian: Աշոտ Մալաքեան; Armenian: Աշոտ Մալաքյան) on 15 October 1920 in Rodosto, Ottoman Empire to Armenian parents. In 1924, Verneuil's family fled to Marseille to escape the persecution of Armenian following the Armenian genocide. He later recounted his childhood experience in the novel Mayrig, which he dedicated to his mother and made into a 1991 film with the same name, which was followed by a sequel, 588 Rue Paradis, the following year.

Verneuil entered the École Nationale d'Arts et Metiers in Aix-en-Provence in 1942. After graduation, he worked as a journalist, then became editor of Horizon Armenian magazine.

=== Film career ===
In 1947, Verneuil managed to convince the established European film actor Fernandel to appear in his first film.

In 1951 he directed his first feature, the black comedy La Table aux crevés. His second film, Forbidden Fruit (1952), based on a Georges Simenon novel, was even more acclaimed.

Later he also directed other movie stars including Jean Gabin, Alain Delon, Lino Ventura (all together acting for him in "Le clan des siciliens" in 1969), Jean-Paul Belmondo ("Le Corps de mon ennemi" in 1976 and other films), Omar Sharif, Claudia Cardinale (Mayrig), Yves Montand and Michèle Morgan. Verneuil has filmed almost all the great figures of French cinema, with the exception of Bourvil, as even Louis de Funès has a small role in one of his films.

After the American experience (he was called the "most American of French directors"), in 1969 Verneuil "found" France. He was awarded a César in 1996 and he was elected a member of the Academy of Fine Arts in 2000.

== Personal life ==
Verneuil was first married to the film editor Françoise Bonnot, before later divorcing. Verneuil and Bonnot had two children, including the director Patrick Malakian. Verneuil later married Véronique Sedro with whom he had two children, including the actress Gaya Verneuil.

On 11 January 2002 died in Bagnolet aged 81. Verneuil is buried at his family burial vault in Marseille.

== Legacy ==
The opening of the seventh annual Golden Apricot International Film Festival in Yerevan paid tribute to Verneuil. His son, television director Patrick Malakian received the posthumous award, the Parajanov's Thaler, for his father's contribution to cinema.

== Filmography ==
- Pipe chien (1950)
- On demande un bandit (1950)
- Maldonne (1950)
- La Légende de Terre-Blanche (1950)
- L'Art d'être courtier (1950)
- Compositeurs et Chansons de Paris (1951)
- Village Feud (1951) (+ screenwriter)
- Le Fruit défendu (1952) (+ screenwriter)
- Full House (1952)
- The Baker of Valorgue (1953)
- Carnaval (Carnival) (1953)
- L'Ennemi Public n°1 (Public Enemy No. 1) (1953)
- Le Mouton à cinq pattes (The Sheep Has Five Legs) (1954) (director + screenwriter)
- Les Amants du Tage (1955)
- People of No Importance (1956) (+ screenwriter)
- Paris, Palace Hotel (1956) (+ screenwriter)
- A Kiss for a Killer (1957) (+ screenwriter)
- Sois belle et tais-toi (1958)
- Maxime (1958) (+ screenwriter)
- The Big Chief (1959)
- La Vache et le Prisonnier (1959) (+ screenwriter), with Fernandel
- L'Affaire d'une nuit (1960)
- La Française et l'amour (1960)
- Le Président (The President) (1961) (+ screenwriter), with Jean Gabin
- Les Lions sont lâchés (1961)
- Un singe en hiver (1962), with Jean Gabin and Jean-Paul Belmondo
- Mélodie en sous-sol (1963) (Any Number Can Win) (1964 Edgar Award, Best Foreign Film), with Alain Delon and Jean Gabin
- Cent mille dollars au soleil (1964) (+ screenwriter), with Jean-Paul Belmondo and Lino Ventura
- Week-end à Zuydcoote (1964), with Jean-Paul Belmondo
- La Vingt-cinquième heure (The 25th Hour) (1967) (+ screenwriter), with Anthony Quinn
- La Bataille de San Sebastian (A wall for San Sebastian) (1968), with Anthony Quinn and Charles Bronson
- Le Clan des Siciliens (The Sicilian Clan) (1969) (+ screenwriter), starring Delon, Gabin and Ventura
- Le Casse (1971) (+ screenwriter), with Jean-Paul Belmondo and Omar Sharif
- Le Serpent (Night Flight from Moscow) (1973) (+ screenwriter), with Henry Fonda and Yul Brynner
- The Night Caller (1975) (+ screenwriter), with Jean-Paul Belmondo
- Le Corps de mon ennemi (1976) (+ screenwriter), with Jean-Paul Belmondo
- I comme Icare (I as in Icarus) (1979) (+ screenwriter), with Yves Montand
- A Thousand Billion Dollars (1982) (+ screenwriter)
- Les Morfalous (1984) (+ screenwriter), with Jean-Paul Belmondo
- Mayrig (Mother) (1992) (+ screenwriter)
- 588 Rue Paradis (1993) (+ screenwriter)

== See also ==
- List of French Academy Award winners and nominees
