= Fred Chichin =

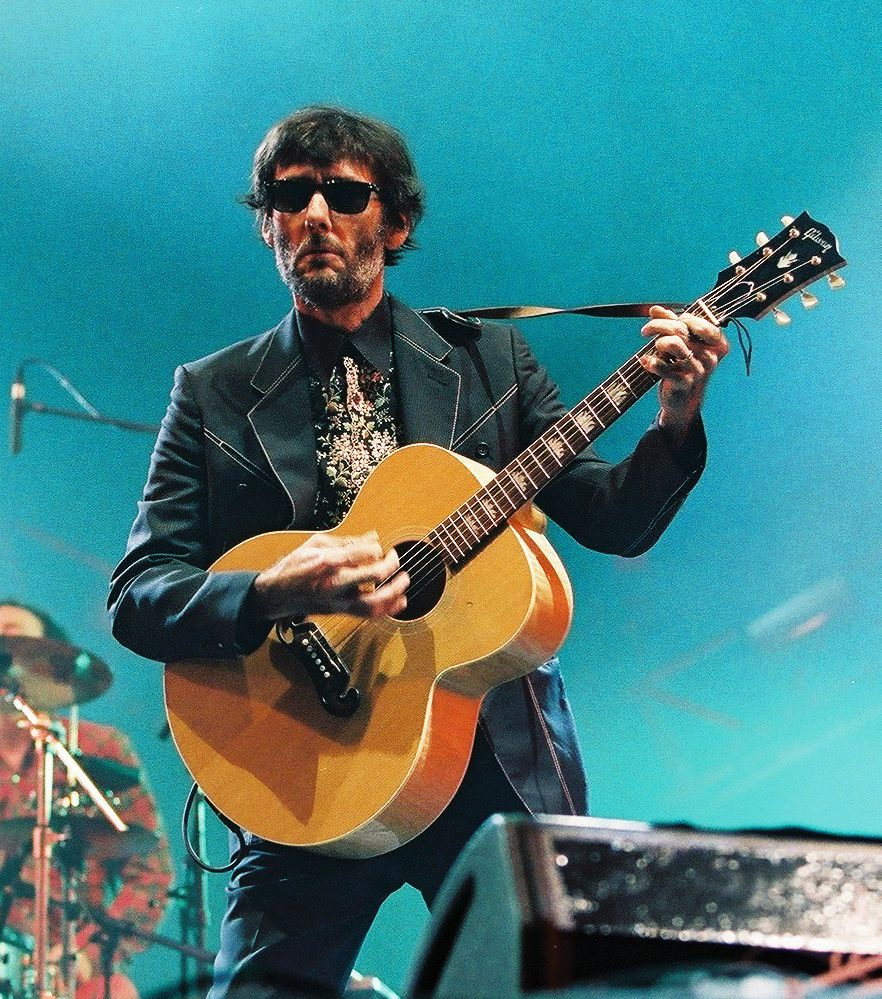
- Chichin performing live with Les Rita Mitsouko at the Eurockéennes, 2007

Background information
- Born: Frédéric Alexis Alphonse Chichin; 1 May 1954; Clichy, Île-de-France, France
- Died: 28 November 2007 (aged 53) Villejuif, Île-de-France, France
- Genres: New wave; pop rock; alternative rock; chanson
- Instruments: Vocals; guitars; keyboards
- Formerly of: Les Rita Mitsouko; Taxi Girl

Frédéric Chichin (French pronunciation: [fʁedeʁik ʃiʃɛ̃]; 1 May 1954 – 28 November 2007) was a French musician, singer, songwriter and multi-instrumentalist.

He was part of the pop-rock duo Les Rita Mitsouko, along with Catherine Ringer, whom he met in 1979. Prior to his work in Les Rita Mitsouko, Chichin had been active in the rock bands Fassbinder (with Jean Neplin), Taxi Girl (with Daniel Darc), and Gazoline (with Alain Kan).

Chichin died on the morning of 28 November 2007 from heart failure, following complications of the cancer the doctors had diagnosed two months earlier. He was buried 6 December 2007 in a private ceremony at the Parisian cemetery of Montmartre.

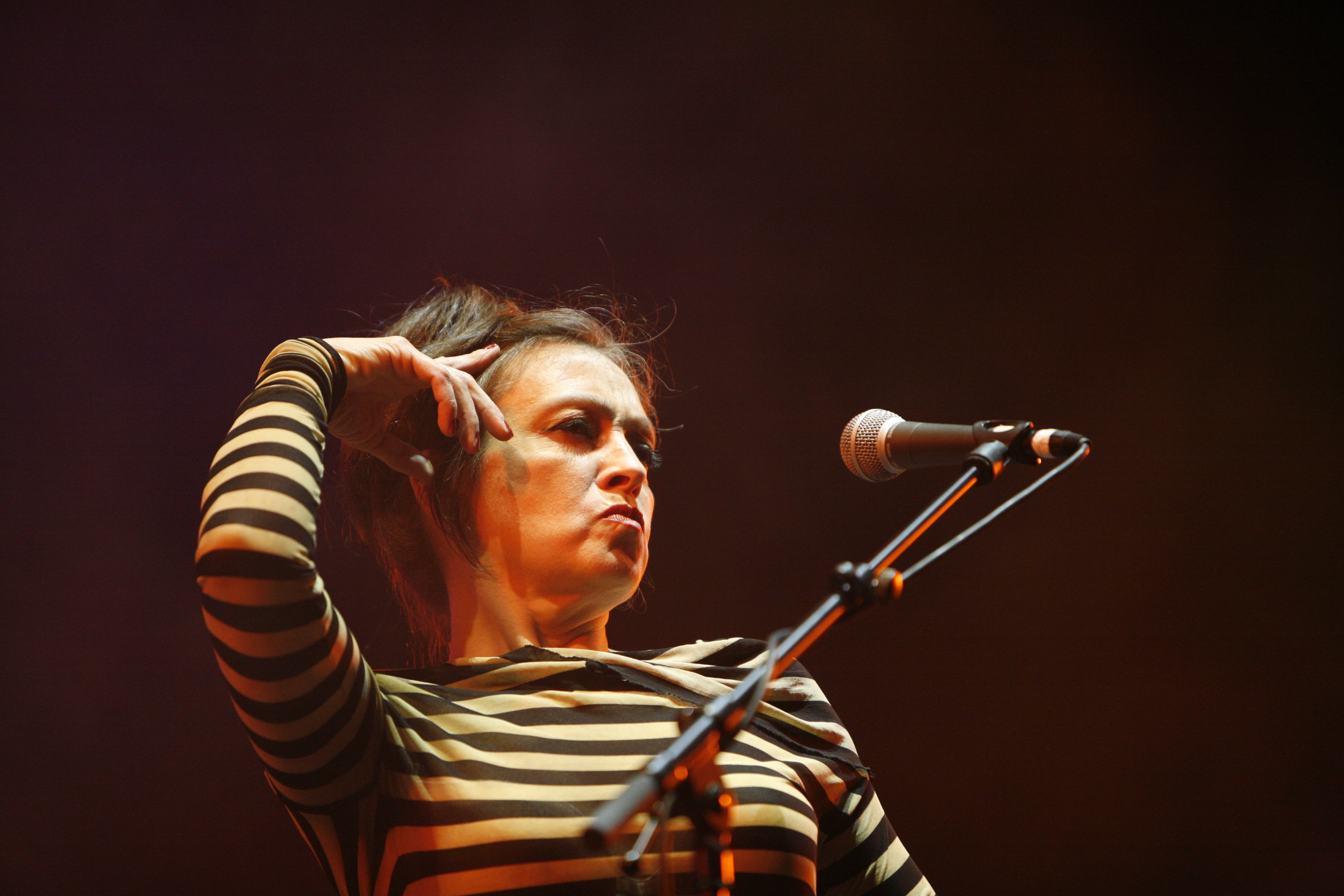
Catherine Ringer
