= Gotan Project discography =

This is the discography for French electronic music ensemble Gotan Project.

== Studio albums ==
Title	Album details	Peak chart positions									Certifications
Title	Album details	FRA	AUS	AUT	SWI	POL	GER	UK	NLD	BEL	Certifications
La Revancha del Tango	Released: 27 November 2001; Label: XL Recordings, ¡Ya Basta!; Formats: CD, digital download	12	—	14	53	28	—	91	82	43	FRA: Platinum; SWI: Gold; UK: Gold; POL: Gold
Lunático	Released: 11 April 2006; Label: XL Recordings, ¡Ya Basta!; Formats: CD, digital download	6	47	14	3	3	56	66	40	3	FRA: Gold; POL: Gold
Tango 3.0	Released: 20 April 2010; Label: XL Recordings; Formats: CD, digital download	4	—	12	6	19	41	61	40	3	FRA: Platinum
"—" denotes a recording that did not chart or was not released in that territory.

== Remix albums ==
Title	Album details	Peak chart positions			
Title	Album details	FRA	AUT	SWI	BEL
Inspiración Espiración	Released: 14 September 2004; Label: Beggars XL; Formats: CD, digital download	46	47	40	24
La Revancha en Cumbia	Released: 25 October 2011; Label: ¡Ya Basta!; Formats: CD, digital download	122	—	—	—
"—" denotes a recording that did not chart or was not released in that territory.

== Live albums ==
Title	Album details	Peak chart positions	
Title	Album details	SWI	FRA
Gotan Project Live	Released: 14 November 2008; Label: ¡Ya Basta!; Formats: CD, digital download	98	135
"—" denotes a recording that did not chart or was not released in that territory.

== Compilation albums ==
Title	Album details	Peak chart positions	
Title	Album details	FRA	BEL
Gotan Object	Released: 18 November 2008; Label: ¡Ya Basta!; Formats: CD (Box set)	—	—
Best of	Released: 14 November 2011; Label: ¡Ya Basta!; Formats: CD	52	53
"—" denotes a recording that did not chart or was not released in that territory.

== Singles ==
Title	Year	Peak chart positions		Album
Title	Year	UK	BEL	Album
"Vuelvo Al Sur / El Capitalismo Foráneo"	2000	—	—	La Revancha del Tango
"Last Tango In Paris / Triptico"	2000	—	—	La Revancha del Tango
"Santa María (Del Buen Ayre) / Chunga's Revenge"	2001	—	—	La Revancha del Tango
"Santa María (Del Buen Ayre)"	2002	91	—	La Revancha del Tango
"Epoca"	2002	—	—	La Revancha del Tango
"Peter Kruder & Antipop Consortium Remixes"	2002	—	—	Inspiración Espiración
"Confianzas"	2004	—	—	Inspiración Espiración
"La Cruz Del Sur"	2004	—	—	non-album single
"La Cruz Del Sur (Remixes)"	2005	—	—	non-album single
"Diferente"	2006	—	60	Lunático
"Mi Confesión"	2006	—	—	Lunático
"La Vigüela"	2007	—	—	Lunático
"La Gloria"	2010	—	75	Tango 3.0
"Rayuela"	2010	—	—	Tango 3.0
"Tu Misterio"	2010	—	—	Tango 3.0
"Peligro"	2010	—	—	Tango 3.0
"—" denotes a recording that did not chart or was not released in that territory.

== Extended plays ==
Title	EP details
Gotan Project Remixes	Released: 2001; Label: ¡Ya Basta!; Formats: CD
Una Musical Brutal EP	Released: 28 October 2003; Label: ¡Ya Basta!; Formats: CD
El Norte	Released: 16 November 2006; Label: ¡Ya Basta!; Formats: CD
3.0 Bonus Tracks	Released: 2010; Label: ¡Ya Basta!; Formats: CD
Santa Maria, Vol. 2	Released: 16 September 2002; Label: XL Recordings; Formats: digital download
Mi Confesion	Released: 6 November 2006; Label: XL Recordings; Formats: digital download
Live At KCRW	Released: 6 November 2006; Label: XL Recordings; Formats: digital download
Rayuela	Released: 25 October 2010; Label: XL Recordings; Formats: CD, LP, digital download
Tango 3.0 Remix EP	Released: 25 October 2010; Label: XL Recordings; Formats: CD, digital download
La Gloria (Remixes)	Released: 30 March 2011; Label: ¡Ya Basta!; Formats: CD, LP, digital download
Nueva Cumbia Remixes	Released: 16 April 2011; Label: ¡Ya Basta!; Formats: CD, LP
Strength To Love	Released: 31 October 2011; Label: ¡Ya Basta!; Formats: CD, LP

== Video albums ==
Title	Video details
La Revancha del Tango Live	Released: 29 November 2005; Label: ¡Ya Basta!; Formats: DVD
Tango 3.0 Live	Released: 1 November 2011; Label: ¡Ya Basta!; Formats: DVD, DVD+Blu-ray
