= Eduardo Makaroff =

Argentine musician, songwriter and producer (born 1954)

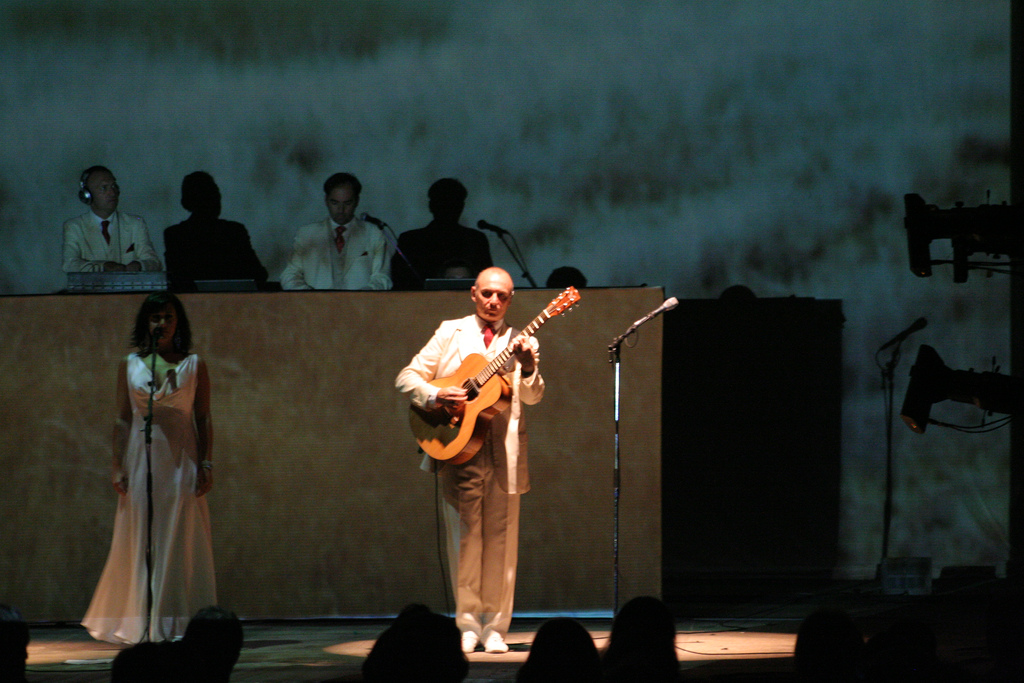
- Makaroff in 2007

Background information
- Also known as: Edu
- Born: 4 April 1954 (age 72); Buenos Aires, Argentina
- Genres: Tango; electronica; trip hop
- Occupations: Musician; songwriter; producer; guitarist
- Instruments: Guitars; vocals
- Website: eduardomakaroff.com

Eduardo Makaroff (born 4 April 1954) is an Argentine musician, songwriter and producer. He is best known as one of the founders of Gotan Project, which has brought together the broad universe of tango with electronic music. He is currently a founding and active member of Plaza Francia Orchestra and Müller & Makaroff, both with long time collaborator Christoph H. Müller.

== Biography ==
Eduardo Makaroff was born in Buenos Aires in 1954. His first group was founded with his brother, Sergio, in the 1970s: Los hermanos Makaroff. Then, in the 1980s, he founded the duo "Edu y el Pollo" with Daniel Mactas.

It was in 1990 that Makaroff arrived in Paris to begin his French career. Upon his arrival in Paris, Makaroff formed the group Mano a Mano, with which he produced Tango Joyeux, an album that received a very warm welcome in France and throughout Europe. He later became the conductor of a famous Parisian tango club, La Coupole, and also toured Europe with his group Tango Mano, while continuing to compose and produce music for the audiovisual industry.

In 1999, Makaroff teamed up with Christoph H. Müller and Philippe Cohen Solal to explore new musical routes and give a different direction to the traditional music of his home country, subsequently Gotan Project was born. Gotan Project's music has been released on many compilation albums and has been used in a large amount of feature films and TV series.

Whilst in Paris, Makaroff met another Argentine, Gérard Lo Monaco, to whom he gave some tango guitar lessons. Together, they went on to create the label Mañana, a label dedicated to the creation in Tango and to the development of Argentine music in the world. Makaroff has also composed and performed film scores and television series credits. He has also presented and produced programs for television and radio.

In 2005 he co-composed with Christoph H. Müller the original music for Not Here to Be Loved, a film by Stéphane Brizé, and in 2007/2008 the soundtrack for El Gaucho, a documentary fiction film by Argentine director Andres Jarach. The composer/producer duo Müller & Makaroff was thus born. During 2012 and 2013 Müller & Makaroff wrote music for the short film Reencuentro by Argentine director Pablo Giorgelli (Camera d’or in Cannes for his film Las Acacias) and for Evita, a radio lecture written by Pablo Agüero starring French actress Jeanne Moreau.

In 2014, Makaroff teamed up again with Christoph H. Müller who together collaborated with vocalist Catherine Ringer to form a new band called Plaza Francia. This resulted in their 7 April 2014 release A New Tango Song Book and a subsequent French-European tour which ended in November 2015.

In 2018 Plaza Francia changed its name to Plaza Francia Orchestra and released a self titled album featuring Catherine Ringer, Lura and Maria Muliterno on vocals. They also collaborated on this record with Argentine musicians Pablo Gignoli and Sebastian Volco. The album cover was designed by Argentine artist Antonio Segui who was based in Paris. They started a new tour during Summer 2018 which ended in Abu Dhabi in Autumn 2019.

Makaroff and Christoph H. Müller have also re-started touring, recording & performing under the moniker Müller & Makaroff. In December 2019, they collaborate with visual artist Ian Kornfeld for a new project, Antropoceno!, which was released for the first time at COP25 in Madrid.

The first single, "Antropoceno (atentas al)", was released in 2020. The song featured Fémina, Hilda Lizarazu, and Mia Folino, it was performed at the 2020 UN Global Climate Action Awards. This single was followed by "Ahora" featuring the voices of Greta Thunberg and David Attenborough. In May 2022 they released "Todo puede suceder" featuring Kevin Johansen in a joint operation with Brian Eno's EarthPercent organisation.

== Discography ==
=== Los Hermanos Makaroff ===
- 1974 : "El rock del Ascensor"
- 1976 : "Areglate Gorda" (Pepe Cheto)

=== Edu y el Pollo ===
- 1984 : "Muchas cosas"
- 1984 : "Edu y el Pollo"

=== Mano a Mano ===
- 1990 : "Tango Joyeux"
- 1994 : "Sin Peluca"

=== Gotan Project ===
- 1999 : Gotan Project "Vuelvo al sur/El capitalismo foraneo (maxi 10")"
- 2000 : Gotan Project "Santa Maria (Maxi 10")"
- 2000 : Gotan Project "Triptico (Maxi 10")"
- 2001 : Gotan Project "La revancha del tango"
- 2006 : Gotan Project "Lunatico"
- 2006 : Je ne suis pas là pour être aimé (soundtrack)
- 2008 : Soundtrack of the film "El gaucho"
- 2010 : Gotan Project "Tango 3.0"
- 2014 : Plaza Francia "A new tango songbook"
- 2015 : Plaza Francia "Live Re-Experience"
- 2018 : Plaza Francia Orchestra "Plaza Francia Orchestra"

=== Plaza Francia ===
- 2014 : "A New tango Song Book"
- 2018 : "Plaza Francia Orchestra"

== Filmography ==
=== Original music ===
- Te amo (de Eduardo Calcagno) (1986)
- Je ne suis pas là pour être aimé (2005)
- Nordeste (de Juan Solanas) (2005)
- El gaucho (de Andrés Jarach), (2009)
- Au fil d'Ariane (2014)

==== With Gotan Project ====
- Shall We Dance – "Santa María (del buen ayre)" 2001 (http://youtu.be/4u6ycs90YIk)
- Ocean's 12 – "El Capitalismo Foraneo" (http://vimeo.com/12067064)
- The Bourne Identity – "Época"
- The Truth About Charlie – "Época"
- Meant to Be – "Época"
- Knight & Day – "Santa María (del buen ayre) "Santa María Pepe Braddock rmx" "Diferente"
- Lies & Alibis – "Santa María (del buen ayre)"
- Guess Who – "Queremos Paz"
- Benjamim – "Vuelvo al Sur”
- Powder Blue – "Amor Porteño"
- Tom at the Farm – "Santa María (del buen ayre)"

=== Documentaries ===
==== Gotan Project ====
- Maradona, Gamin en Or
- The Take

=== Original soundtrack ===
- Louie/Didou

==== With Gotan Project ====
Nip/Tuck

- S05E13 - "El Capitalismo Foráneo"
- S03E15 - "Santa María (del buen ayre)"

Chuck

S01E03 - "Santa María (del buen ayre)"

Sex and the City

- S06E20 - "Queremos Paz”

Six Feet Under

- S03E09 - "Vuelvo al Sur"

Brothers & Sisters

- S04E05 - “Santa María (del buen ayre)

Dancing With the Stars (2009)

- Round Eight - "Santa María (del buen ayre)
- Round Six -"Mi Confesión"
- Round Three - "Cité Tango'

So You Think You Can Dance

- USA
1. Top 12 Perform (2011) - "Tríptico"
2. Top 18 Perform (2008) - "Mi Confesión"
- Canada
1. Top 20 (2008) - "Santa María (del buen ayre)"
- Australia
1. Top 16 Perform (2008) - "Santa María (del buen ayre)"

== Awards ==
- BBC Radio 3 Awards for World Music - 2003
- BBC Radio 3 Awards for World Music - 2007
- Victoires de la Musique - 2003
- Grands Prix SACEM - 2010

== Distinctions ==
- Chevalier des Arts et des Lettres
