= Christoph H. Müller =

Swiss musician

Christoph H.Müller
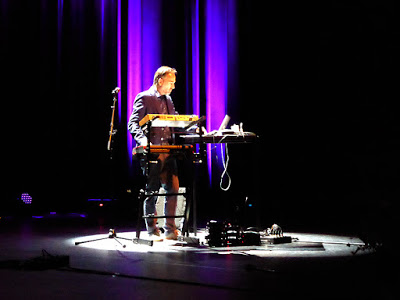

Background information
- Born: 2 July 1967 (age 59); Stuttgart, Germany
- Genres: Electronic music; pop; Tango; world music
- Occupations: Musician; songwriter; producer; programmer; sound engineer
- Instruments: Electronics; bass guitar; synthesizer; keyboards
- Years active: 1983–present
- Labels: Because Music; Ya Basta; Universal Music Group; Groenland; Wrasse

Christoph H. Müller (born 1967) is a Swiss musician, composer, producer and audio engineer. He is best known as a co-founder of the electronica/neotango band Gotan Project. He is currently a founding and active member of Plaza Francia Orchestra and Müller & Makaroff, both with long-time collaborator Eduardo Makaroff.

== Biography ==
As a teenager, Müller was part of different bands, including Touch El Arab, whose song "Muhammar" became a top 5 hit in Switzerland in 1987.

After studies at the Universities of Basel and Zürich he moved to Paris to study at "Ecole des Hautes Etudes en Sciences Sociales". At the same time he continued music and founded together with Paris-based American singer/songwriter Gabriela Arnon the band Ten Mother Tongues. They released one album in 1997, called The Listening Tree.

In 1995 he started a close collaboration with French label Ya Basta records. He released tracks under such names as "The Boyz from Brazil" with his future colleague Philippe Cohen Solal, "Stereo Action Unlimited", and "Fruit of the loop" and worked on music for short films, TV jingles and advertising.

In 1999 he co-founded, together with Argentinean musician Eduardo Makaroff and French producer Philippe Cohen Solal, Gotan Project, whose new form of Argentinean tango has had huge success all over the world. They released three albums: La Revancha del Tango (2001), Lunatico (2006) and Tango 3.0 (2010), and did three successful world tours, until the fall of 2011.

At the same time, Müller founded his own production company, March:Music, in 2004 to develop his other musical projects, like his solo project Roy Dubb and – together with Afro Peruvian musicians – the project RADIOKIJADA, whose first album Nuevos Sonidos Afro Peruanos was released in 2009 on Wrasse records. The album garnered rave reviews in the UK, and the band played at the WOMAD festival in Reading, being one of the highlights, according to The Guardian.

In 2005 he co-composed with Eduardo Makaroff the original music for Not Here to Be Loved, a film by Stéphane Brizé, and in 2007/2008 the soundtrack for El Gaucho, a documentary fiction film by Argentinean director Andres Jarach. The composer/producer duo Müller & Makaroff was thus born. During 2012 & 2013 Müller & Makaroff wrote music for the short film Reencuentro by Argentinean director Pablo Giorgelli (Camera d’or in Cannes for his film Las Acacias) and for Evita, a radio lecture written by Pablo Agüero starring French actress Jeanne Moreau.

Also in 2012 he started a collaboration with electronic music icon Hans-Joachim Roedelius (from Krautrock band Cluster). They played live together in Paris and in Lunz (Austria).

In 2014, Müller & Eduardo Makaroff together collaborated with vocalist Catherine Ringer to form a new band called Plaza Francia. This resulted in their 7 April 2014 release A New Tango Song Book and a subsequent French/European tour which ended in November 2015.

In 2015, the first album of his collaboration with Roedelius, Imagori, was released by Groenland Records.

In 2018 Plaza Francia changed its name to Plaza Francia Orchestra' and released a self titled album featuring Catherine Ringer, Lura and Maria Muliterno on vocals. They also collaborated on this record with Argentinean musicians Pablo Gignoli and Sebastian Volco. The album cover was designed by Argentinian artist Antonio Segui who was based in Paris. They started a new tour during Summer 2018 which ended in Abu Dhabi in Autumn 2019.

Also in 2018, Müller released the second album of his collaboration with Roedelius, Imagori II.

Müller & Eduardo Makaroff have also re-started touring, recording & performing under the moniker Müller & Makaroff. In December 2019, they collaborate with visual artist Ian Kornfeld for a new project ANTROPOCENO! which was presented for the first time at COP25 in Madrid.

The first single Antropoceno (atentas al) featuring Fémina, Hilda Lizarazu and Mia Folino was released in the Autmumn of 2020 which was performed at the 2020 UN Global Climate Action Awards. This single was followed by Ahora featuring the voices of Greta Thunberg and David Attenborough. In May 2022 they released Todo puede suceder featuring Kevin Johansen in a joint operation with Brian Eno's EarthPercent organisation.

In 2024 Müller and Makaroff compose the music for "La Danse des Jeux" (Dance of the Games) a choreography by Mourad Merzouki for the 2024 Summer Olympics in Paris, France. This participative dance was destined for educational purposes in schools and sports clubs all over France and in french schools all over the world.

Also together with Eduardo Makaroff, Müller composes and produces the music for Mourad Merzouki's latest creation "Beauséjour" which premieres in July 2024 at "Les Nuits de Fourvière" festival in Lyon, France. Beauséjour is now on tour worldwide ·

En 2026 Müller & Makaroff release the album ANTROPOCENO! Vol. I & II, a compilation of singles released previously and new material from their project Antropoceno! which combines music and science in order to raise awareness for the challenges humanity is facing due to the self-inflicted destruction of their own habitat, planet Earth.

== Discography ==
=== Albums and EPs ===
- 1987: Touch el Arab - We Believe
- 1988: Touch el Arab - LRK
- 1989: Touch el Arab - Limited
- 1997: Ten Mother Tongues - The Listening Tree
- 1997: Fruit of the Loop - S*xplore (maxi 12")
- 1997: The Boyz from Brazil - Solidao (maxi 12")
- 1997: The Boyz from Brazil - Chica Boom (maxi 12")
- 1998: Stereo Action Unlimited - Hifi Trumpet
- 1999: The Boyz from Brazil
- 1999: Gotan Project - Vuelvo al sur/El capitalismo foraneo (maxi 10")
- 2000: Gotan Project - Santa Maria (maxi 10")
- 2000: Gotan Project - Triptico (maxi 10")
- 2000: Stereo Action Unlimited - Lovelight (maxi 12")
- 2001: Gotan Project - La revancha del tango
- 2005: Radiokijada - Nuevos sonidos afroperuanos part I (maxi 12")
- 2006: Gotan Project - Lunatico
- 2006: Je ne suis pas là pour être aimé (soundtrack)
- 2006: Roy Dubb - Harambe (maxi 12")
- 2006: Roy Dubb - Afro Blue (maxi 12")
- 2007: Les Meilleurs Meilleurs - Audio book for children
- 2008: Soundtrack of the film El gaucho
- 2009: Radiokijada - Nuevos sonidos afroperuanos
- 2010: Gotan Project - Tango 3.0
- 2014: Plaza Francia - A new tango songbook
- 2015: Plaza Francia - Live Re-Experience
- 2015: Mueller_Roedelius - Imagori
- 2018: Plaza Francia Orchestra - Plaza Francia Orchestra
- 2018: Mueller_Roedelius - Imagori II
- 2022: Radiokijada - Nuevos sonidos afroperuanos (Remixes)
- 2022: Müller & Makaroff - El gaucho digtal (Remixes)
- 2025: Müller & Makaroff - Beauséjour (Original Soundtrack)
- 2026: Müller & Makaroff - ANTROPOCENO! Vol. I & II

=== Compilations ===
- 1989: TransEuropa: A Swiss-Swedish Techno Sampler
- 1989: Stop the Army Vol.I
- 1997: Soundtrack of the film Clubbed to death
- 1998: Soundtrack of the film Je ne voudrais pas crever un dimanche
- 2004: Inspiracion/Espiracion: A Gotan Project DJ set
- 2007: Ya Basta Records: 10 years after all

Gotan Project's music has been released on many compilation albums and has been used in many feature films and TV series.

== Filmography ==
=== Film music ===
- Je n'aimerais pas crever un dimanche (1998)
- Not Here to Be Loved (dir. Stéphane Brizé) (2005)
- Je déteste les enfants des autres (2007)
- El gaucho (dir. Andrés Jarach) (2009)
- Reencuentro (dir. Pablo Giorgelli) (2012)
- Au fil d'Ariane (dir. Robert Guédiguian) (2014)

==== With Gotan Project ====
- Tom at the Farm (Tom à la ferme) "Santa Maria (del buen ayre)"
- Shall We Dance - "Santa María (del buen ayre)” 2001
- Ocean's 12 - "El Capitalismo Foraneo"
- The Bourne Identity - "Época"
- The Truth about Charlie - "Época"
- Meant to Be - "Época"
- Knight & Day - "Santa María (del buen ayre)” "Santa María Pepe Braddock rmx" "Diferente"
- Lies & Alibis - "Santa María (del buen ayre)“
- Guess Who - "Queremos Paz"
- Benjamim - "Vuelvo al Sur"
- Powder Blue - "Amor Porteño"

=== Documentaries ===
- El Gaucho (directed by Andres Jarach)

==== With Gotan Project ====
- Maradona, Gamin en Or
- The Take (directed by Naomi Klein)

=== TV series ===
==== With Gotan Project ====
Nip/Tuck

- S05E13 - "El Capitalismo Foráneo"
- S03E15 - "Santa María (del buen ayre)”

Chuck

- S01E03 - "Santa María (del buen ayre)“

Sex and the City

- S06E20 - "Queremos Paz"

Six Feet Under

- S03E09 - "Vuelvo al Sur"

Brothers & Sisters

- S04E05 - "Santa María (del buen ayre)

Dancing With the Stars (2009)

- Round Eight - "Santa María (del buen ayre)
- Round Six -"Mi Confesión"
- Round Three - "Cité Tango"

So You Think You Can Dance

- USA
1. Top 12 Perform (2011) - "Tríptico"
2. Top 18 Perform (2008) - "Mi Confesión"
- Canada
1. Top 20 (2008) - "Santa María (del buen ayre)”
- Australia
1. Top 16 Perform (2008) - "Santa María (del buen ayre)“

== Awards ==
- BBC Radio 3 Awards for World Music UK - 2003
- BBC Radio 3 Awards for World Music UK - 2007
- Victoires de la Musique France - 2003
- Grand Prix SACEM France - 2010

== Distinctions ==
- Chevalier des Arts et des Lettres (Knight of the Order of Arts and Letters)
