= Plaza Francia Orchestra =

International music project

Plaza Francia
- Origin: International / France
- Years active: 2014–present
- Members: Eduardo Makaroff; Christoph H. Müller
- Past members: Catherine Ringer
- Website: plazafrancia.tv

Plaza Francia Orchestra is an international musical project of a trio of famous musicians made up of Argentine Eduardo Makaroff and Swiss Christoph H. Müller both from Gotan Project as well as Catherine Ringer (from French band Les Rita Mitsouko) as main vocalist.

== History ==
Originally founded as Plaza Francia post the release of the 2010 Gotan Project album Tango 3.0, Eduardo Makaroff and Christoph H. Müller collaborated with vocalist Catherine Ringer which resulted in their 7 April 2014 release A New Tango Song Book. The album came with critical acclaim and a commercial success in France and also charting in Belgium.

In 2018, Plaza Francia changed its name to Plaza Francia Orchestra and released a self-titled album featuring Catherine Ringer, Lura, and Maria Muliterno on vocals. They also collaborated on this record with Argentine musicians Pablo Gignoli and Sebastian Volco. The album cover was designed by Argentine artist Antonio Segui, who was based in Paris.

Today, Plaza Francia Orchestra continue to tour, where they perform the repertoire as well as tracks released by Eduardo Makaroff and Christoph H. Müller under the moniker Müller & Makaroff.

== Band name ==
The band was named after Plaza Francia, a real square in the chic Recoleta district of Buenos Aires that was built to celebrate the friendship between France and Argentina. It was somewhere Makaroff used to hang out with his counter-cultural friends, smoking weed in the 1970s.

== Discography ==
=== Albums ===
Year	Album	Peak positions			Notes
Year	Album	FR	BEL (Vl)	BEL (Wa)	Notes
2014	A New Tango Song Book	16	164	52	Tracklist: 1. "La mano encima" (4:00); 2. "Secreto" (3:35); 3. "Timidez" (3:41); 4. "La misión" (3:34); 5. "Invisible" (4:20); 6. "Memoria del placer" (3:38); 7. "Cada vez" (3:59); 8. "La que se fue" (3:32); 9. "Cenizas" (4:26); 10. "Mi calle" (4:06); 11. "Vueltas en el aire" (3:19); 12. "El avión" (3:38)
2018	Plaza Francia Orchestra	n/a	n/a	n/a	Tracklist: 1. "Dedos de oro" (4:15); 2. "La Plaza Francia" (2:30); 3. "Barbara Monica feat. Catherine Ringer" (3:51); 4. "Cabala" (4:17); 5. "Te prohibo" (4:36); 6. "Un lugar feat Lura" (4:04); 7. "Tranquilo" (4:17); 8. "Clase de Tango" (3:47); 9. "Arrebato feat. Lura" (3:44); 10. "Paraiso terrenal" (4:04); 11. "Todo estaba planeado feat. Catherine Ringer" (3:42); 12. "Oblivion" (5:13)
