= Inspiración Espiración =

Studio album by Gotan Project
- Released: 2004
- Genre: Electronic
- Label: XL Recordings

Gotan Project chronology
La Revancha del Tango (2001)	Inspiración Espiración (2004)	Lunático (2006)

Inspiración Espiración is Gotan Project's remix album, released in 2004.

== Track listing ==
1. "La Cumparsita" - 0:32
2. "Cité Tango" - 3:54
3. "Round About Midnight" - 7:09
4. "Confianzas" - 5:28
5. "The Man (El Hombre Remix)" - 7:12
6. "Percusiόn (Part 1)" - 4:14
7. "La Del Ruso (Calexico Version)" - 7:01
8. "El Capitalismo Foráneo (Antipop Consortium Remix)" - 3:26
9. "Tres Y Dos (Tango)" - 2:52
10. "M.A.T.H." - 2:55
11. "Tríptico (Peter Kruder Trip De Luxe)" - 10:10
12. "Santa Maria (Del Buen Ayre) (Pepe Bradock Wider Remix)" - 7:06

Bonus CD

1. "La Cruz Del Sur" - 5:33
2. Video "Sentimentale" (Director – Prisca Lobjoy) - 9:44

== Personnel ==
- Philippe Cohen Solal
- Christoph H. Müller
- Eduardo Makaroff
