= La Voz Argentina =

Argentine reality talent show

- Also known as: La Voz Argentina
- Genre: Talent show
- Created by: John de Mol Jr.
- Presented by: Marley Wiebe; Candelaria Molfese; Luli Fernandez; Sofia Astrovsky; Nicholas Okkiato
- Judges: Axel; Soledad Pastorutti; José Luis Rodríguez; Miranda!; Ricardo Montaner; Tini Stoessel; Mau y Ricky; Lali Espósito; Luck Ra
- Country of origin: Argentina
- Original language: Spanish
- No. of seasons: 5
- No. of episodes: 279

Production
- Producers: Talpa (2012–2018); ITV Studios (2021–)
- Production locations: Buenos Aires, Argentina
- Running time: 90–120 min.

Original release
- Network: Telefe
- Release: 1 July – 2 December 2012
- Release: 1 October 2018 – present

Related
- The Voice (franchise); The Voice; The Voice of Holland; The Voice UK

La Voz Argentina is an Argentine reality talent show that premiered on Telefe in 2012. Based on the original The Voice of Holland, and part of an international franchise, created by John de Mol Jr..

== Overview ==
The series is part of The Voice franchise and is based on a similar competition format in the Netherlands entitled The Voice of Holland won by Ben Saunders. The first Argentine series will be hosted by Marley, with Candelaria Molfese serving as the backstage and social networking correspondent. The winner will receive a record deal with Universal Republic.

The show will be the second singing competition broadcast by Telefe, after the success of the Argentine version of Operación Triunfo, that was aired from 2003 to 2009. It will compete against another singing competition broadcast by the competitor channel, El Trece, Cantando por un Sueño, hosted by José María Listorti.

=== Format ===
The series consists of three phases: a blind audition, a battle phase, and live performance shows. Four coaches, all noteworthy recording artists, choose teams of contestants through a blind audition process. Each coach has the length of the auditioner's performance (about one minute) to decide if he or she wants that singer on his or her team; if two or more coaches want the same singer (as happens frequently), the singer has the final choice of coach.

Each team of singers is mentored and developed by its respective coach. In the second stage, called the battle phase, coaches have two of their team members battle against each other directly by singing the same song together, with the coach choosing which team member to advance from each of individual "battles" into the first live round. Within that first live round, the surviving four acts from each team again compete head-to-head, with public votes determining one of two acts from each team that will advance to the final eight, while the coach chooses which of the remaining three acts comprises the other performer remaining on the team.

In the final phase, the remaining contestants compete against each other in live broadcasts. The television audience and the coaches have equal say 50/50 in deciding who moves on to the final 4 phase. With one team member remaining for each coach, the (final 4) contestants compete against each other in the finale with the outcome decided solely by public vote.

== Coaches' timeline ==
Coach	Seasons				
Coach	1	2	3	4	5
Axel					
Soledad Pastorutti					
Miranda!					
Jose Luis Rodriguez					
Ricardo Montaner					
Tini Stoessel					
Mau y Ricky					
Lali Espósito					
Luck Ra					
Emilia Mernes			C.S.		
MYA				C.S.	
Karina					C.S.

Current coaches

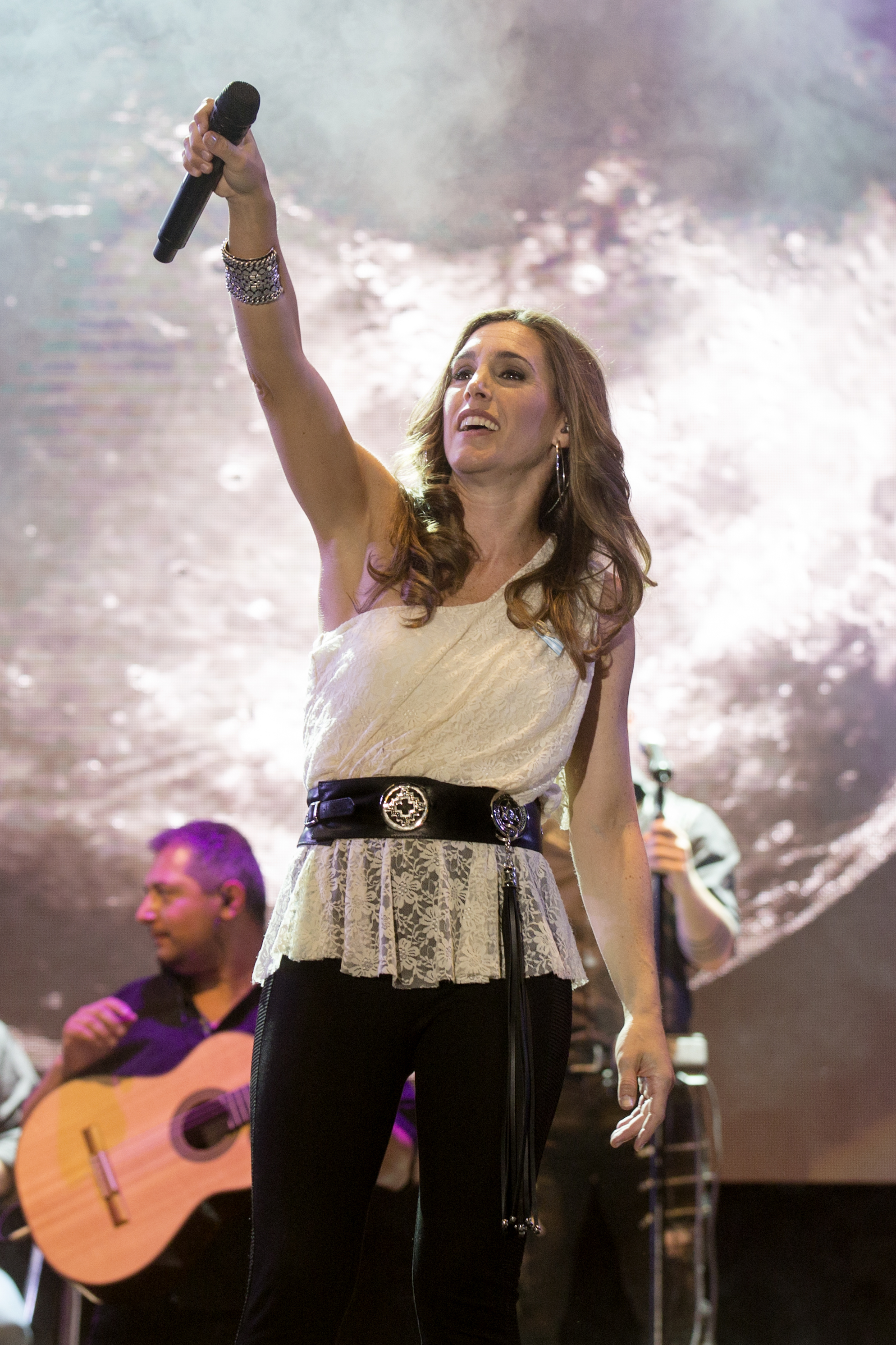
Soledad Pastorutti (2012–)

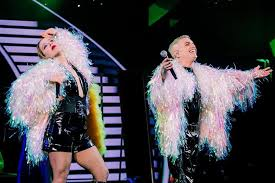
Miranda! (2012, 2025–)

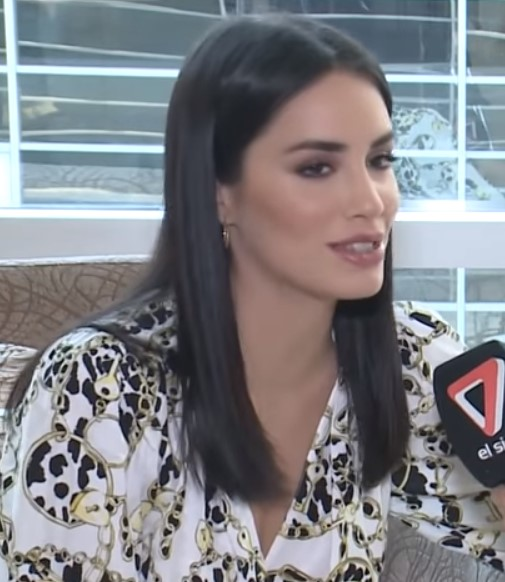
Lali Esposito (2021–)

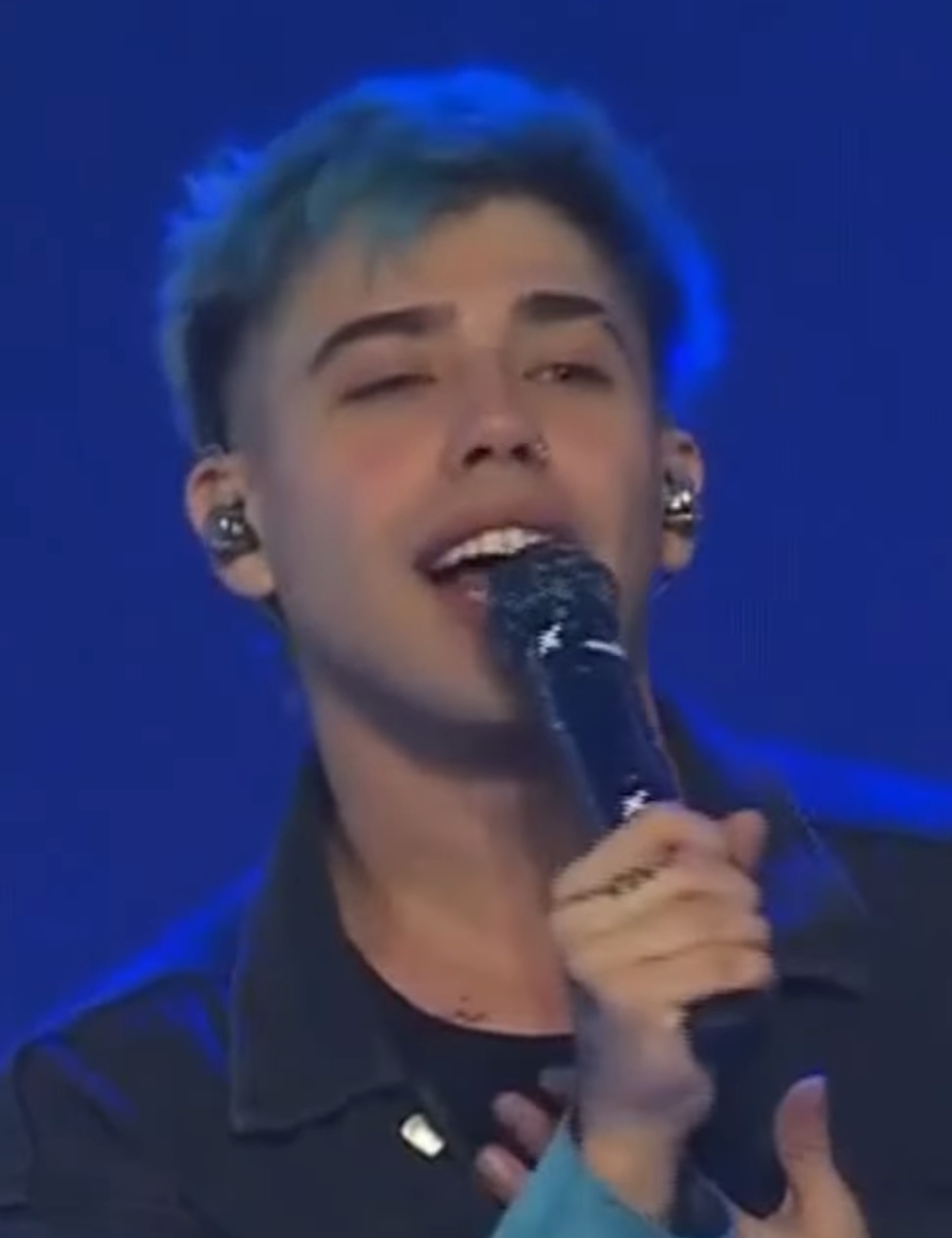
Luck Ra (2025—)

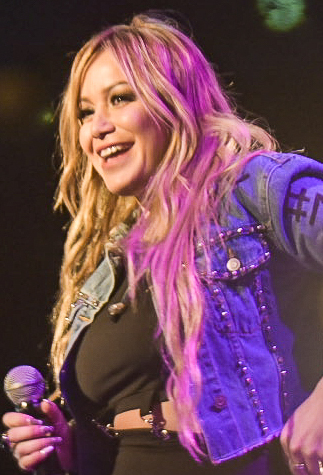
Karina (Comeback Stage, 2025–)
Former coaches

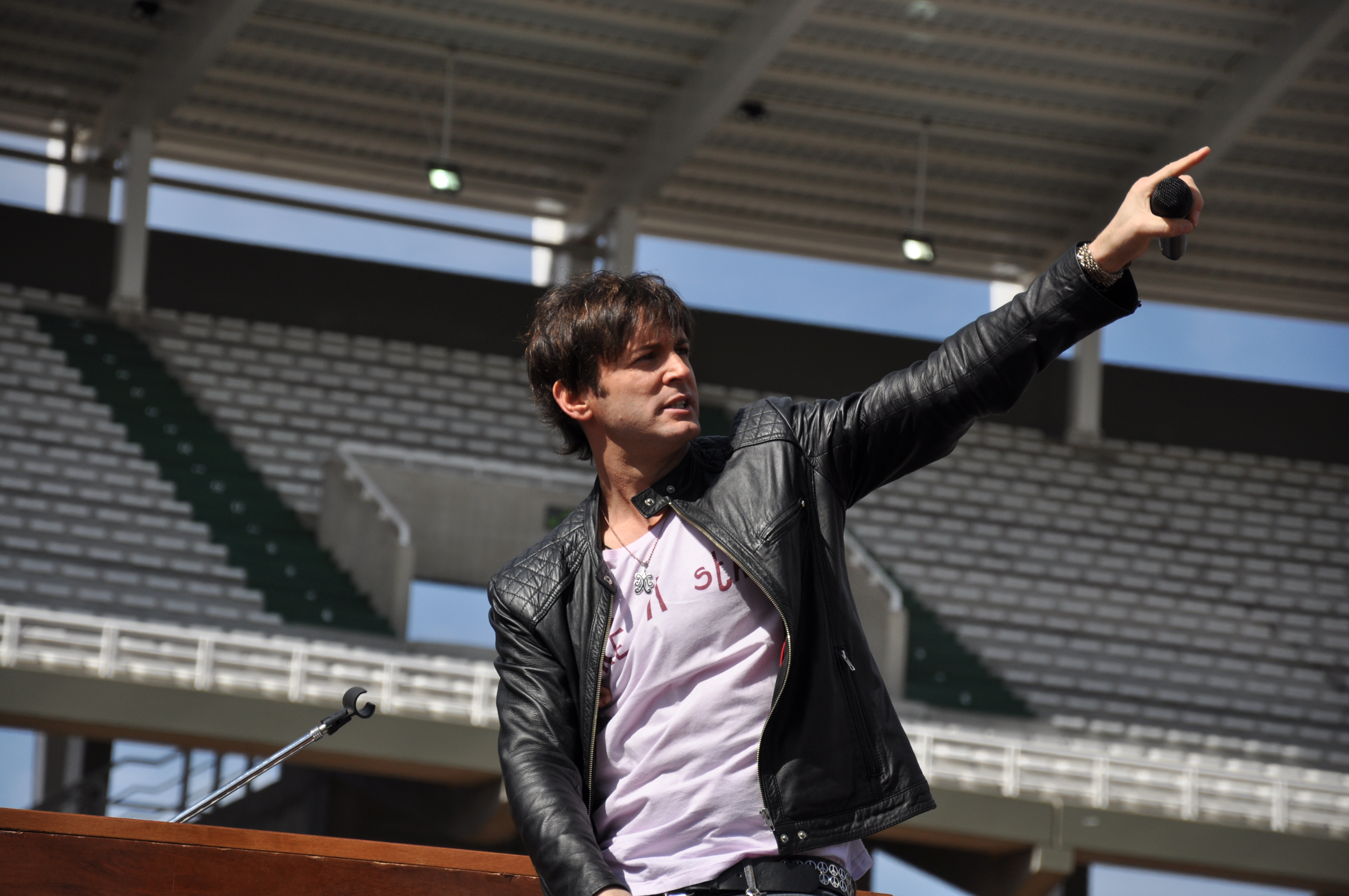
Axel (2012–2018)

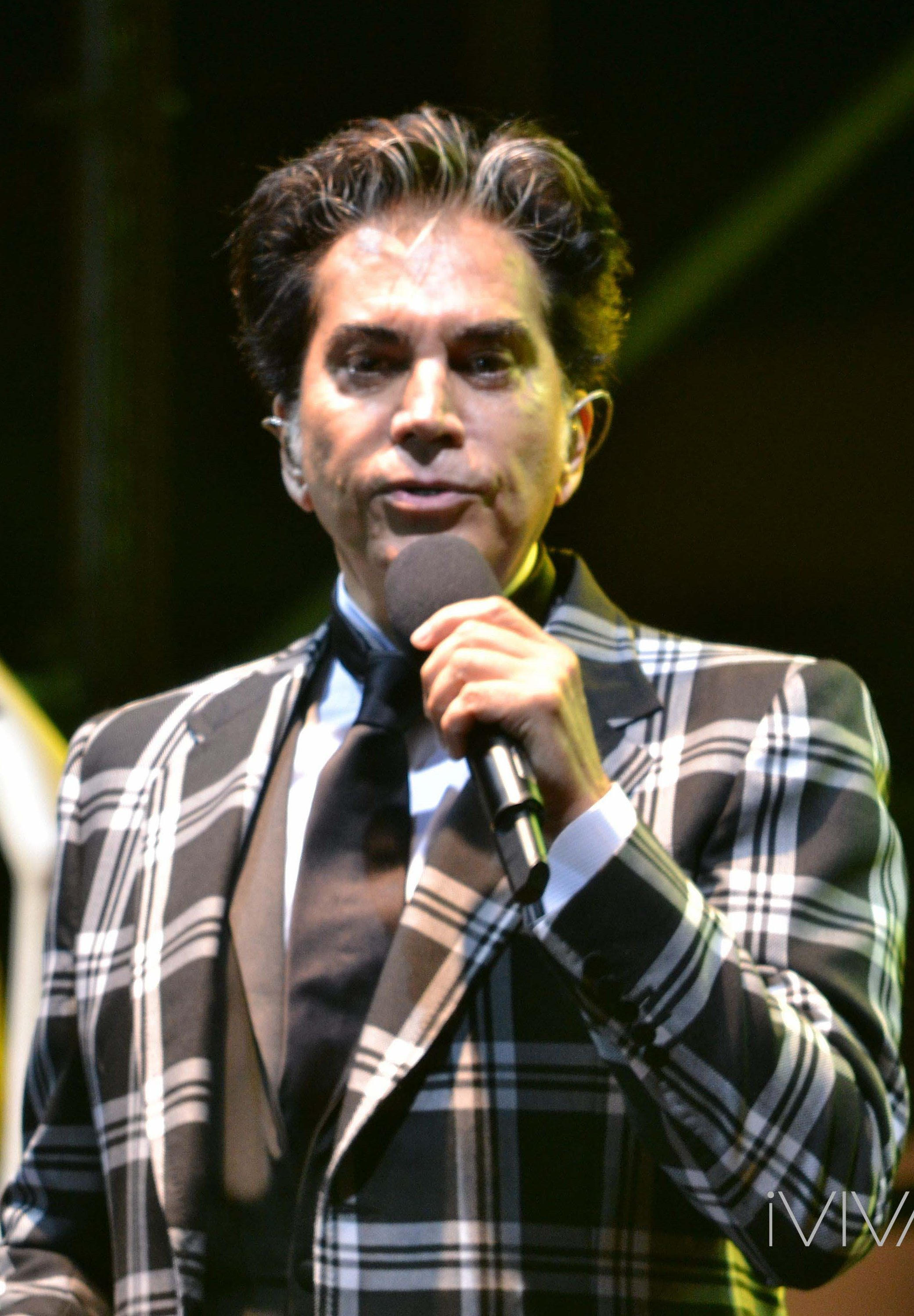
José Luis Rodríguez (2012)

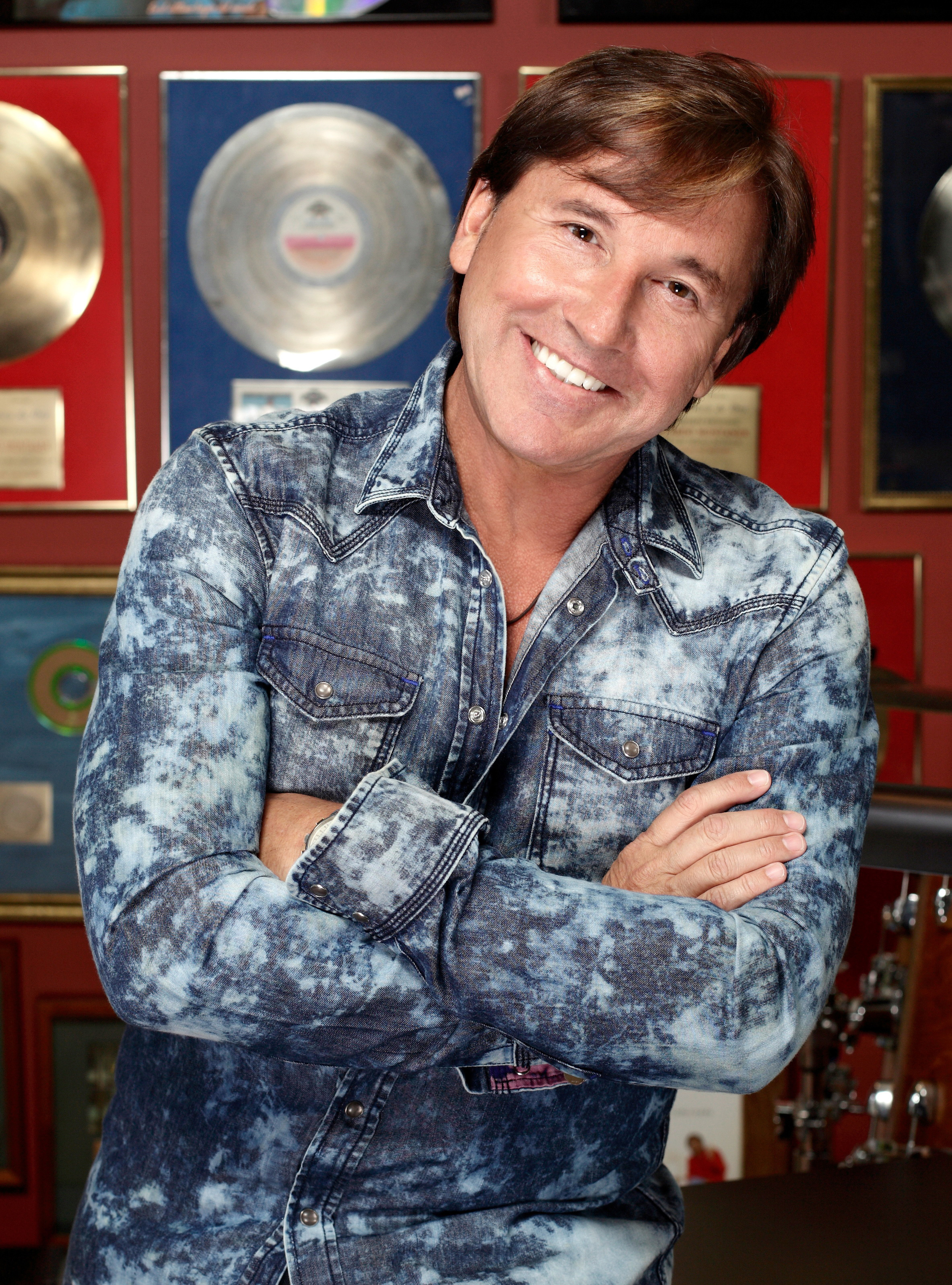
Ricardo Montaner (2018–2022)

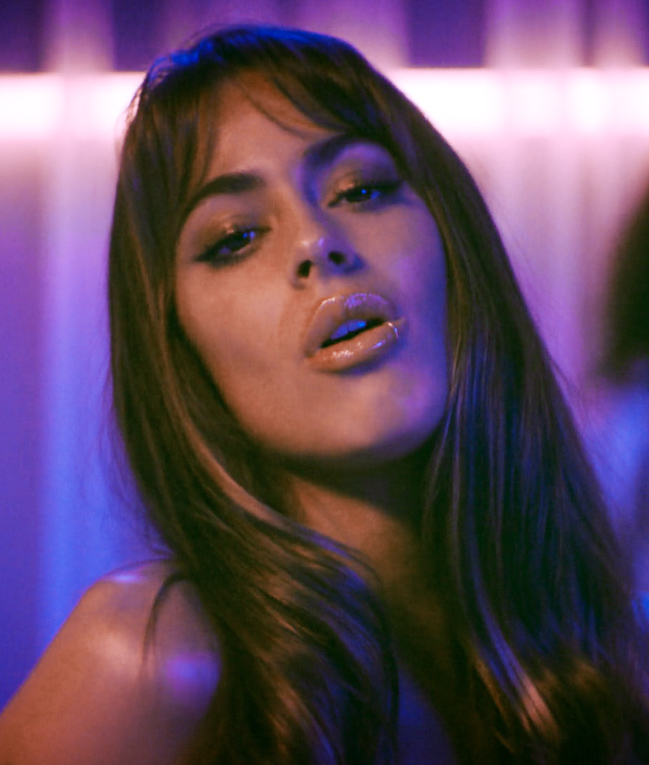
Tini Stoessel (2018)

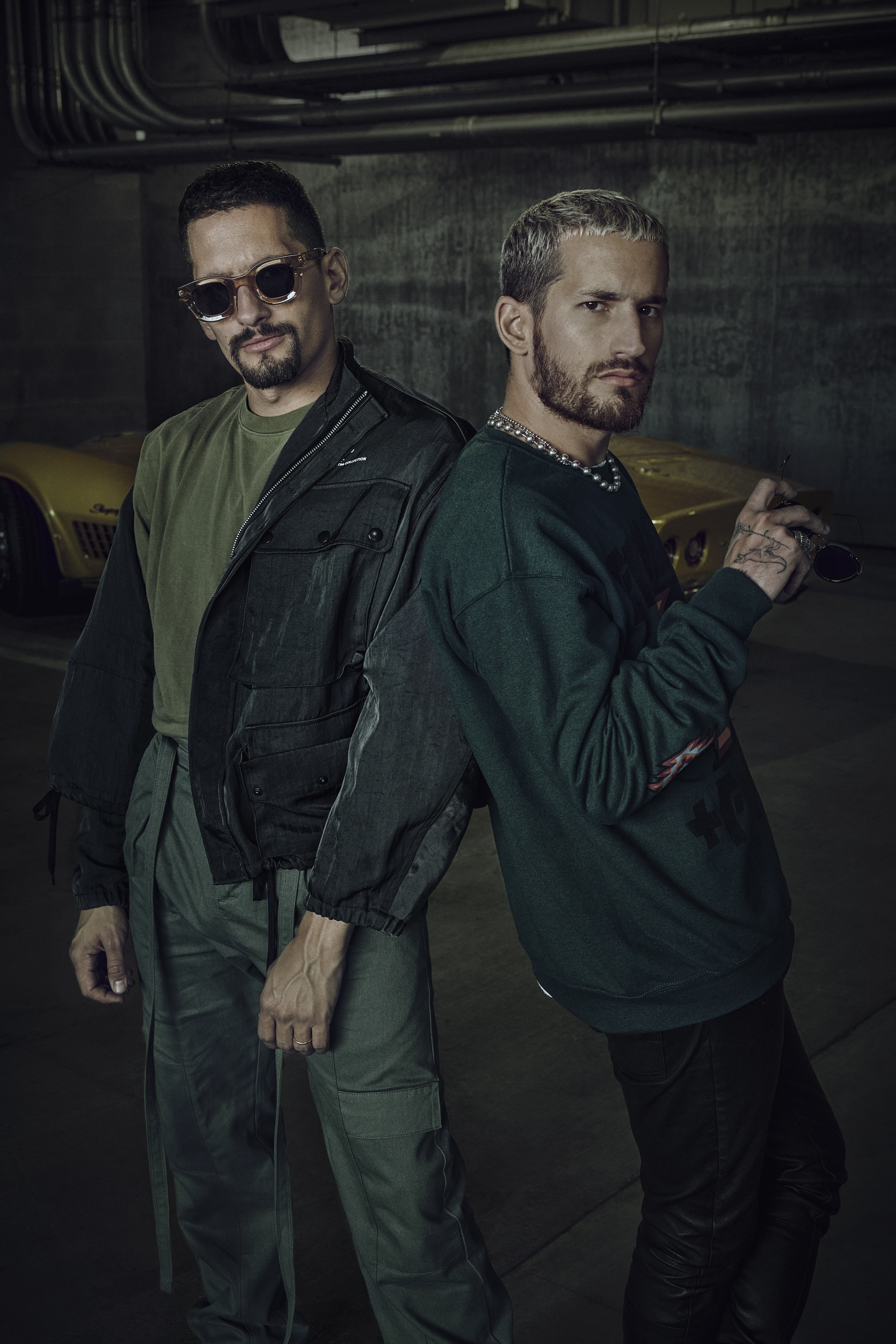
Mau y Ricky (2021–2022)

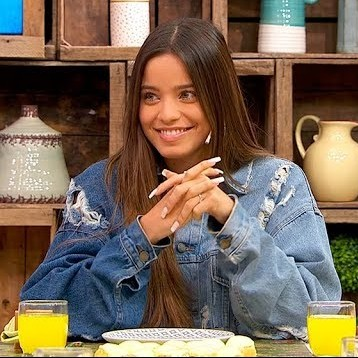
Emilia Mernes (Comeback Stage, 2021)

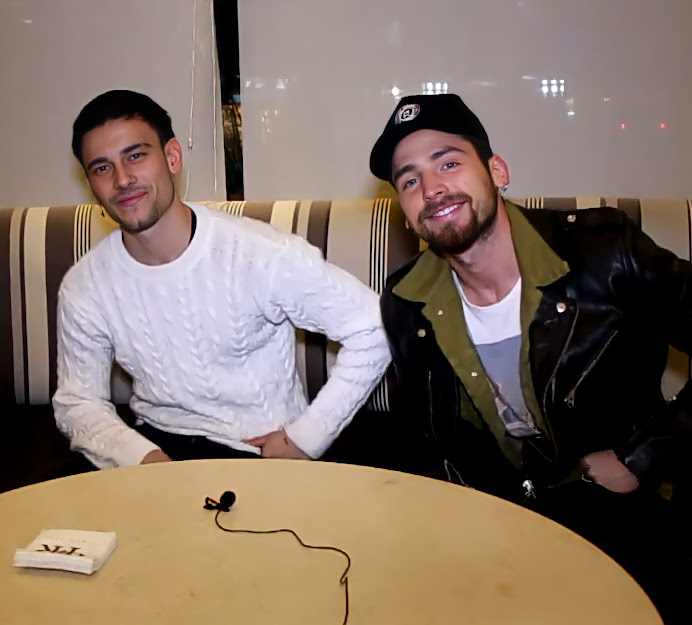
MYA (Comeback Stage, 2022)

=== Coaches' line-up ===
Coaches' line-up by chairs order
Season	Year	Coaches			
Season	Year	1	2	3	4
1	2012	Axel	Soledad	Miranda!	Puma
2	2018	Montaner	Soledad	Tini	Axel
3	2021	Montaner	Soledad	Mau y Ricky	Lali
4	2022	Montaner	Soledad	Mau y Ricky	Lali
5	2025	Lali	Luck Ra	Miranda!	Soledad

== Coaches' advisors ==
Season	Coaches and their advisors			
1	Axel	Soledad Pastorutti	Miranda!	Puma
1	Noel Schajris	Coti	Hilda Lizarazu	Nito Mestre
2	Ricardo Montaner	Soledad Pastorutti	Tini Stoessel	Axel
2	Mau y Ricky	Kany García	Cali & El Dandee	Becky G
2	Carlos Vives (Knockouts)			
3	Ricardo Montaner	Soledad Pastorutti	Mau y Ricky	Lali Espósito
3	Nahuel Pennisi	Miranda!	Nicki Nicole	Cazzu
3	Abel Pintos (Playoffs)			
4	Ricardo Montaner	Soledad Pastorutti	Mau y Ricky	Lali Espósito
4	(Battles)			
4	Palito Ortega	Karina la Princesita	Manuel Turizo	Álex Ubago
4	(Knockouts)			
4	Alejandro Lerner	Diego Torres	FMK	Mateo Sujatovich
5	Lali Espósito	Luck Ra	Miranda!	Soledad Pastorutti
5	(Battles)			
5	Dillom	La Joaqui	Valeria Lynch	Yami Safdie
5	(Knockouts)			
5	Zoe Gotusso	Cazzu	Emmanuel Horvilleur	Chaqueño Palavecino
5	(Playoffs)			
5	Joaquín Levinton	La K'onga	Tiago PZK	Juanes
5	(Second Round)			
5	La Joaqui	Tiago PZK	Pablo Tamagnini	Valeria Lynch

== Coaches semifinalists and finalists ==
- Winner
- Runner-up
- Third place
- Fourth place
- First names listed are the finalists: winners in **bold** and other finalists in italic.

Season	Coaches and contestants			
1	Team Axel	Team Soledad	Team Miranda!	Team Puma
1	Mateo Iturbide; María Inés Roller; Silvia Fernández; Nicolás Sosa	**Gustavo Corvalán**; Iván di Paolo; Laura Dimonti; Mario Suárez	Mariano Poblete; Miguel Ángel Roda; Pablo Utrera (†); Gonzalo Andrada	Antonela Cirillo; José Luis Bartolilla; Jordana Battaglia; Alejandro Serra
2	Team Montaner	Team Soledad	Team Tini	Team Axel
2	**Braulio Assanelli**; Mario Vilurón; Pablo Carrasco; Irvin Escobar	Lucas Belbruno; Darío Lazarte; Dúo Salteño; Sofía Morales	Juliana Gallipoliti; Isabel Aladro; Juan Pablo Nieves; Nicolás Sosa	Amorina Alday; Federico Gómez; Pedro Antonio; Jorge Jofré
3	Team Montaner	Team Soledad	Team Mau & Ricky	Team Lali
3	Ezequiel Pedraza; Ignacio Sagalá; Denis y Axel Ortiz; Steffania Úttaro; Jacinta Sandoval	**Francisco Benítez**; Luna Suárez; Alex Freidig; Patricio Mai	Luz Gaggi; Magdalena Cullen; Marcos Olaguibet; Lautaro Cabrera	Nicolás Olmedo; Paula Chouhy; Santiago Borda; Margarita López
4	Elías Pardal; Naiquén Galizio; Julia Ferrón; Emanuel Cerrudo	**Yhosva Montoya**; Huilén Currá; Damián Ayala; Martín Ronconi	Iván Papetti; Octavio Muratore; Cecilia Mirabile; Francisco Escudero	Ángela Navarro; Tomás Sagués; Emilia Soler; Juan Manuel Godoy
5	Team Lali	Team Luck Ra	Team Miranda!	Team Soledad
5	Alan Lez; Jaime Muñoz; Giuliana Piccioni; Valentino Rossi	**Nicolás Behringer**; Nathalie Aponte; Thomas Dantas; Federico Mestre	Eugenia Rodríguez; Emiliano Villagra; Pablo Cuello; Joaquín Martínez	Milagros Amud; Violeta Lemo; Luis González; Agustín & Mauricio

== Series overview ==
Warning: the following table presents a significant amount of different colors.

Teams color key
Artist from Team Soledad	Artist from Team Axel	Artist from Team Mau & Ricky
Artist from Team Miranda!	Artist from Team Montaner	Artist from Team Lali
Artist from Team Puma	Artist from Team Tini	Artist from Team Luck Ra

The Voice series overview
Season	Aired	Winner	Runner-up	Third place	Fourth place	Winning coach	Host
1	2012	Gustavo Corvalán	Mariano Poblete	Antonella Cirillo	Mateo Iturbide	Soledad Pastorutti	Marley
2	2018	Braulio Assanelli	Lucas Belbruno	Amorina Alday	Juliana Gallipoliti	Ricardo Montaner	Marley
3	2021	Francisco Benitez	Luz Gaggi	Nicolás Olmedo	Ezequiel Pedraza	Soledad Pastorutti	Marley
4	2022	Yhosva Montoya	Ángela Navarro	Iván Papetti	Elías Pardal	Soledad Pastorutti	Marley
5	2025	Nicolás Behringer	Alan Lez	Milagros Amud	Eugenia Rodríguez	Luck Ra	Nicolas Occhiato

=== Coaches' results ===
Considering the final placement of the contestants who are members of their team (not the final placement of the coaches):

Coaches' results
Coach	Winner	Runner-up	Third place	Fourth place
Soledad Pastorutti	Thrice (1, 3–4)	Once (2)	Once (5)	—
Ricardo Montaner	Once (2)	—	—	Twice (3–4)
Luck Ra	Once (5)	—	—	—
Lali Espósito	—	Twice (4–5)	Once (3)	—
Mau y Ricky	—	Once (3)	Once (4)	—
Miranda!	—	Once (1)	—	Once (5)
Axel	—	—	Once (2)	Once (1)
Puma	—	—	Once (1)	—
Tini	—	—	—	Once (2)

== Seasons' summaries ==
=== Season 1 ===
Name	Age	Description	Musical style	Advisor
Soledad Pastorutti	40 years	International Star	Música tradicional	Coti
Miranda!	42–49 years old	International Star	Electropop	Hilda Lizarazu
El Puma	78 years old	International Artist	Balada, bolero, pop latino	Nito Mestre
Axel	44 years old	International Artist	Balada romántica, pop latino.	Noel Schajris

=== Season 2 ===
Name	Age	Description	Musical style	Advisors
Ricardo Montaner	63 years old	International Star	Pop latino, balada	Mau y Ricky
Soledad Pastorutti	40 years old	International Star	Música tradicional	Kany García
Axel	44 years old	International Star	Balada romántica, pop latino.	Becky G
Tini Stoessel	23 years old	International Artist	Pop, pop latino, balada, reguetón.	Cali & El Dandee

=== Season 3 ===
Name	Age	Description	Musical style	Advisors
Soledad Pastorutti	40 years old	International Star	Música tradicional	Miranda!
Mau y Ricky	27–30 years old	Internacional Duo	Pop latino, trap, reguetón	Nicki Nicole
Lali Espósito	29 years old	International Star	Pop, pop latino, dance pop, hip hop	Cazzu
Ricardo Montaner	63 years old	International Star	Pop latino, balada	Nahuel Pennisi
Fifth coach for "The Comeback Stage"
Emilia Mernes	24 years old	International Star	Reguetón, Urban	—N/a

=== Season 4 ===
Name	Age	Description	Musical style	Advisors
Soledad Pastorutti	41 years old	International Star	Música tradicional	Karina
Lali Espósito	30 years old	International Star	Pop, pop latino, dance pop, hip hop	Álex Ubago
Mau y Ricky	28–31 years old	Internacional Duo	Pop latino, trap, reguetón	Manuel Turizo
Ricardo Montaner	65 years old	International Star	Pop latino, balada	Palito Ortega
Fifth coach for "The Comeback Stage"
MYA	25–27 years old	Internacional Duo	Pop latino, balada, teen pop	—N/a

=== Season 5 ===
Name	Age	Description	Musical style	Advisors
Luck Ra	26 years old	International Artist	Trap, reggaeton, cumbia	La Joaqui
Lali Espósito	33 years old	International Star	Pop, pop latino, dance pop, hip hop	Dillom
Soledad Pastorutti	44 years old	International Star	Música tradicional	Yami Safdie
Miranda!	46–53 years old	International Star	Electropop	Valeria Lynch
Fifth coach for "The Comeback Stage"
Karina	39 years old	International Star	Cumbia	—N/a
