= Hopscotch (Cortázar novel) =

1963 novel by Julio Cortázar

- First edition
- Author: Julio Cortázar
- Original title: Rayuela
- Translator: Gregory Rabassa
- Language: Spanish
- Publisher: Sudamericana; Pantheon (US)
- Publication date: 28 June 1963
- Publication place: Argentina
- English publication date: 1966
- Media type: Print (paperback)
- Pages: 576
- OCLC: 14412231
- Dewey Decimal: 863 19
- LC Class: PQ7797.C7145 R313 1987

Hopscotch (Spanish: Rayuela) is a novel by Argentine writer Julio Cortázar. Written in Paris, it was published in Spanish in 1963 and in English in 1966. For the first U.S. edition, translator Gregory Rabassa split the inaugural National Book Award in the translation category.

Widely regarded as one of the greatest, most innovative and influential Latin American novels, Hopscotch is a stream-of-consciousness novel which is advised to be read according to two (or three) different sequences of chapters; the third being read with chapters in any order. This novel is often referred to as a counter-novel, as it was by Cortázar himself. It meant an exploration with multiple endings, a neverending search through unanswerable questions.

== "Table of Instructions" and structure ==
An author's note suggests that the book would best be read in one of two possible ways: either progressively from chapters 1 to 56, with all subsequent "expendable chapters" being excluded, or by "hopscotching" through the entire set of 155 chapters according to a "Table of Instructions" designated by the author. Chapter 55 is left out all together in this second method, and the book would end with a recursive loop, as the reader is potentially left to "hopscotch" back and forth between chapters 58 and 131 infinitely. Cortázar also leaves the reader the option of choosing a unique path through the narrative. Several narrative techniques are employed throughout the book, and frequently overlap, including first person, third person, and a kind of stream-of-consciousness. Traditional spelling and grammatical rules are not always applied.

The first 36 chapters of the novel in numerical order are grouped under the heading "From the Other Side." They provide an account of Horacio Oliveira's life in Paris in the 1950s. La Maga and a band of bohemian intellectuals who call themselves the Serpent Club are other characters who appear in these chapters. Chapters 37 to 56 are collected under the heading "From this Side", and the action takes place in Argentina.

The third section of the book, under the heading "From Diverse Sides", does not need to be read in order to understand the plot, but it does contain solutions to certain puzzles that arise during the perusal of the first two parts. For example, the reader finds out a great deal more about the mysterious Morelli, as well as finding out how La Maga and Emmanuele first became acquainted. Through Morelli's writings, Cortazar hints at some of the motives behind the actual construction of Hopscotch (such as a desire to write a work in which the reader is a true co-conspirator).

== Legacy and influences ==
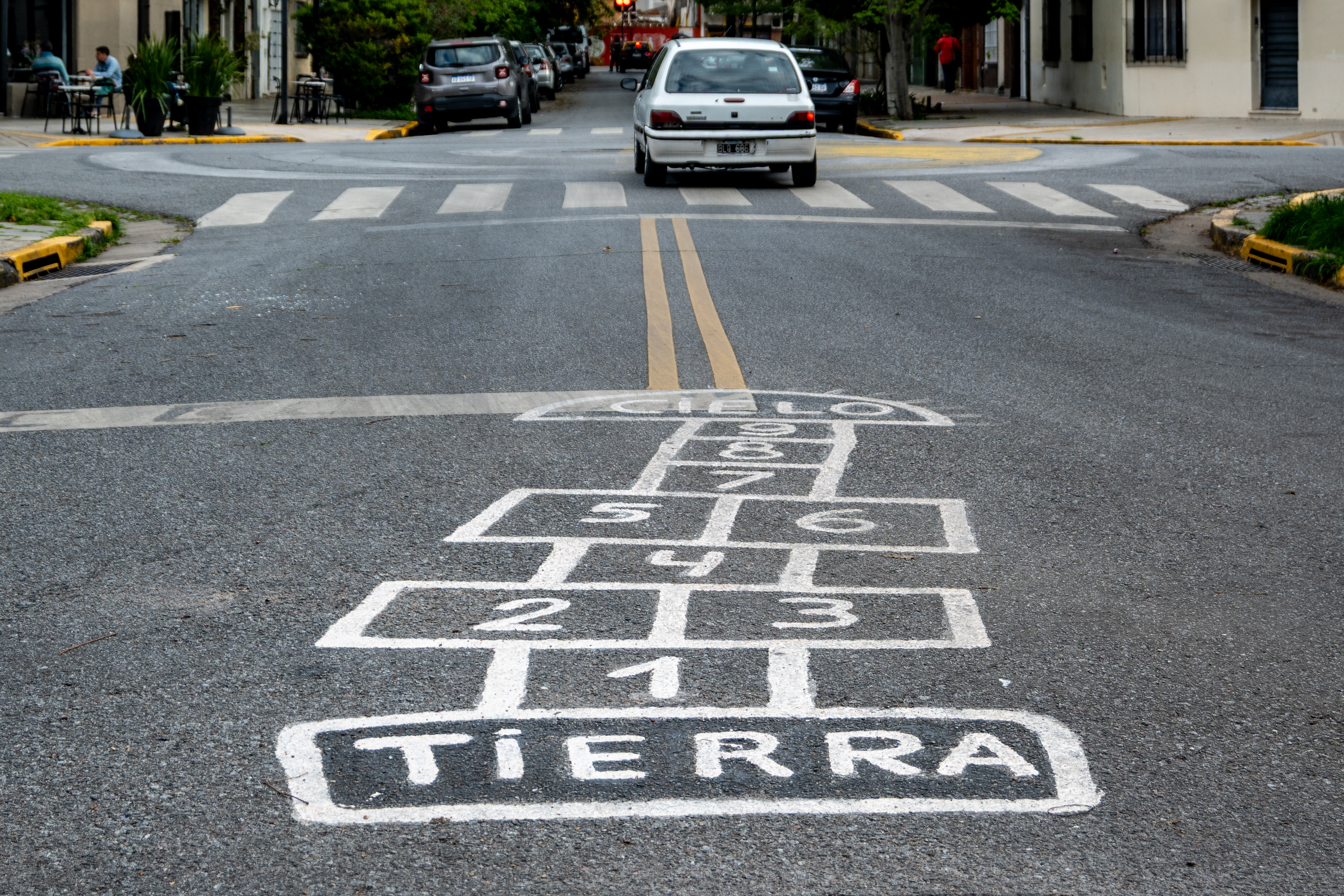
Hopscotch drawn in front of Artigas 3246, the last building where Julio Cortázar lived in Buenos Aires.

Hopscotch has been acknowledged as "one of the great existentialist novels, worthy to stand alongside the efforts of Sartre and Camus", that is also "one of the most innovative postmodern literary works, one that offered deconstructionist critics a text deconstructed before they laid hands on it."

The novel has been called the Latin American equivalent of James Joyce's Ulysses and its innovative, ground-breaking features were assimilated by influential Latin American writers such as Mario Vargas Llosa, Carlos Fuentes and Manuel Puig. Some consider it to be the greatest Latin American novel of the 20th century.

The novel was the inspiration for Yuval Sharon's 2015 production of Hopscotch, an opera by six composers and six librettists set on multiple stages in Los Angeles.

The Gotan Project's 2010 studio album Tango 3.0 includes a song "Rayuela" written in honor of the author.
