= Sindicato Argentino del Hip Hop =

Sindicato Argentino del Hip Hop is a hip hop group formed in Argentina. It consists of three members: Smoler, DJ Fabry and Huexo, and two producers, but it has had different numbers of members over time. The group's style mainly consists of hip hop and funk. The group received a Latin Grammy award in 2001 for best hip hop/rap album.

== History ==
Sindicato Argentino del Hip Hop, which means Argentine Hip Hop Union, started as a group in 1994. In 1996, when Buenos Aires underground hip-hop scene emerged with the first CD compilation of local artists, Sindicato was heading the scene. It was then a full live band with up to ten musicians and two MCs: Smoler (then spelled Smaller) and Derek. They recorded two songs for that CD compilation called Nación Hip Hop, produced by Zeta Bosio of Soda Stereo. One of them, "Del Barrio" (Spanish for "from the hood"), was the only single released from the album and had a video on Latin MTV during 1997.

In 1998, the band added to new MCs: Huexo (Smoler's brother) and Frost (who used to go by the name D-Frost and before that MC Villa). They later dropped the live instrumentation and Fabri, who used to be the drummer, became the DJ. During 1999, they disappeared from the local scene, focusing on recording and developing their production skills. They released an underground cassette distributed locally only in small quantities. It was during this time that they were featured in the hip-hop documentary El Juego by Juan Data and Ariel Winograd.

After being seen in that documentary by a record producer, they signed a contract with Universal Records, becoming the first Argentine rap group to be signed to a major label. However, a lot of people in the local scene saw it as a betrayal of their underground roots, since they had to change their sound and make it more radio-friendly to be able to sign that contract.

Un Paso A La Eternidad was their first official album. It was not successful in Argentina until the album was awarded a Latin Grammy for the best rap in Spanish album of the year. That lead them to tour Latin America and the United States, where the album was released by Universal Latino in 2002.

SOon after the album came out, Derek left the group, leaving only three MCs: brothers Smoler and Huexo and Frost who was one of the original pioneers of the Argentine hip-hop scene, being active since the mid-1980s. For a while, at the end of 2002, they lived in Miami, Florida, where they met their new manager. He later took them to Puerto Rico, where they became more successful than in their homeland. In the meantime, they recorded a song called "Piénsalo" (Spanish for "Think about it") for a compilation album released in Chile and Spain. In that song they insulted an Argentine music journalist and the band Koxmoz, starting a long-lasting dispute.

Through all these years, el Sindicato were victims of a long list of disputes, the most known with theirrivals Koxmoz, but they never gave this much importance.

Their second album, Sangre Sudor & Furia, was released first in Puerto Rico and they never officially played it in Argentina. Soon after the album came out, Frost announced that he was starting his solo career and left Sindicato. Many thought that was the end of the group, but in 2007 they announced a comeback with the last three remaining members: Smoler, Huexo and Fabri.

In 2009, Frost released his first solo album, En Estado Libre (In Free State, referring to his freedom from Sindicato) through the independent international label PHHAT, with production from 23-year-old MC Say.

== Discography ==
- Nación Hip Hop – compilation (BMG, 1997)
- Un Paso a la Eternidad (Universal Records, 2001)
- Sangre, Sudor y Furia (Universal Records, 2005)
