= Not Here to Be Loved =

- Theatrical release poster
- Directed by: Stéphane Brizé
- Written by: Juliette Sales; Stéphane Brizé
- Produced by: Miléna Poylo; Gilles Sacuto
- Starring: Patrick Chesnais; Anne Consigny; Georges Wilson; Lionel Abelanski
- Cinematography: Claude Garnier
- Edited by: Anne Klotz
- Music by: Eduardo Makaroff; Christoph H. Müller (from Gotan Project)
- Production company: TS Productions
- Distributed by: Rézo Films
- Release date: 12 October 2005
- Running time: 93 minutes
- Country: France
- Language: French
- Budget: $2.2 million
- Box office: $2 million

Not Here to Be Loved (French: Je ne suis pas là pour être aimé) is a 2005 French film directed by Stéphane Brizé.

== Plot ==
Fifty years old and divorced, Jean-Claude Delsart is an emotionally withdrawn bailiff who has taken over the family business from his father. He pays a weekly visit to the care home where his cantankerous father now lives, but they are uncomfortable occasions where the father takes pains to hide any sign of affection towards him. Jean-Claude has in turn compelled his own son Jean-Yves to join him in the business; The son is more interested in raising house-plants but does not have the courage to tell his father that he hates the work of bailiff.

When a heart murmur obliges Jean-Claude to take exercise, he opts for tango lessons in the studio opposite his office. There Françoise Rubion recognises in him the older son of her former nanny and chooses him as her dance partner, initially to escape the attentions of an admirer in the same class. Her reason to learn to tango is so as to be able to take part creditably in the opening dance after her forthcoming wedding. Her fiancé Thierry was meant to have joined her there but is too absorbed in the difficulty of trying to write a novel so as to escape his job as a school teacher.

As the relationship between Jean-Claude and Françoise slowly blossoms, they begin to take stock of their personal situations. Jean-Claude argues with his father over his having thrown away the tennis trophies he won as a youngster and leaves in anger. Françoise becomes increasingly unhappy at being dominated by her mother and elder sister and taken for granted by Thierry. Then the jealous rival reveals that Françoise is to be married and, when she tries to explain things to Jean-Claude at his office, he accuses her of making a fool of him and asks her to leave.

The death of Jean-Claude’s father brings him personal insight. Opening a locked cupboard in his room, he discovers there all the tennis trophies and newspaper cuttings that his parent pretended to have cleared out. Returning to his office, he tells Jean-Yves to leave the job he knows that he hates. Then his secretary, a spinster with only a dog to care for, confesses to Jean-Claude that she listened to his quarrel with Françoise and advises him not to make the same mistake as she had in the past and to seize his chance of happiness. He crosses the street to the dance studio and is met by the welcoming smile of Françoise.

== Cast ==
- Patrick Chesnais as Jean-Claude Delsart
- Anne Consigny as Françoise "Fanfan" Rubion
- Georges Wilson as Jean-Claude's father
- Lionel Abelanski as Thierry
- Anne Benoît as Hélène
- Cyril Couton as Jean-Yves Delsart
- Olivier Claverie as Tango course mate
- Geneviève Mnich as Françoise's mother
- Hélène Alexandridis as Françoise's sister

== Awards and nominations ==
- César Awards (France)
  - Nominated: Best Actor – Leading Role (Patrick Chesnais)
  - Nominated: Best Actress – Leading Role (Anne Consigny)
  - Nominated: Best Actor – Supporting Role (Georges Wilson)
- European Film Awards
  - Nominated: Best Actor (Patrick Chesnais)
- San Sebastián International Film Festival (Spain)
  - Won: CEC Award for Best Film
  - Nominated: Golden Seashell (Stéphane Brizé)
- Pyongyang International Film Festival (North Korea)
  - Won: Best Director (Stéphane Brizé)
