= Gotan Object =

Box set by Gotan Project
- Released: 18 November 2008
- Label: Ya Basta!

Gotan Project chronology
El Norte (2007)	Gotan Object (2008)	Tango 3.0 (2010)

Gotan Object is a box set by electro/nuevo tango-band Gotan Project. This box set is in essence an expanded version of the double live album Gotan Project Live released simultaneously. The box set consists of:
- Double CD Gotan Project Live (La Revancha del Tango Tour/Lunático Tour)
- Unreleased 7" vinyl (featuring the 2 bonus tracks from the double live album)
- DVD Visiones (projections used during the tours)
- 152-page photo book titled Carnet de Viajes
- Puzzle poster

== Track listing ==
=== CD 1: La Revancha del Tango Tour ===
1. "Live Intro" - 1:32
2. "Queremos Paz" - 4:14
3. "Vuelvo Al Sur" - 6:03
4. "El Capitalismo Foraneo" - 5:47
5. "La Del Ruso" - 6:30
6. "Santa María (Del Buen Ayre)" - 8:26
7. "Nocturna" - 2:49
8. "Triptico" - 9:36
9. "Chunga's Revenge" - 5:17
10. "Last Tango in Paris" - 6:19
11. "Sola" - 7:10
12. "Santa María (Del Buen Ayre)" (Versión Orquestal) - 2:57 (Bonus Track)

=== CD 2: Lunático Tour ===
1. "Diferente" - 6:28
2. "La Vigüela" - 5:36
3. "Amor Porteńo" - 5:24
4. "Época" - 4:57
5. "Notas" - 4:30
6. "Lunático" - 3:17
7. "Che Bandonéon" (Interlude) - 1:21
8. "Una Música Brutal" - 4:02
9. "Santa María (Del Buen Ayre)" - 4:57
10. "Arrabal" - 4:52
11. "El Norte" - 5:14
12. "Criminal" - 3:46
13. "Tríptico" - 9:26
14. "Diferente" (Versión Orquestal) - 4:00 (Bonus Track)

=== 7" Vinyl ===
1. "Santa María (Del Buen Ayre)" (Versión Orquestal) - 2:57
2. "Diferente" (Versión Orquestal) - 4:00

=== DVD: Visiones ===
1. "El Capitalismo Foráneo/Vuelvo Al Sur" (Medley) - 5:23
2. "Tríptico" - 6:21
3. "Una Música Brutal" - 4:02
4. "Santa María (Del Buen Ayre)" - 5:09
5. "Kyrie" - Excerpt from La Misa Criolla - 1:00
6. "Época" - 4:25
7. "Diferente" - 3:33
8. "Lunático" - 3:02
9. "Amor Porteño" - 5:07
10. "Celos" - 2:54
11. "La Vigüela" - 5:02
