= Plaza Francia =

Plaza Francia may refer to

- Plaza Francia, Buenos Aires, Argentina, a public square
  - Plaza Intendente Alvear, commonly but mistakenly known as Plaza Francia
- Plaza Francia, Lima, Peru, a public square
- Plaza Francia (Caracas), Venezuela, a public space
- Plaza Francia (band), later the Plaza Francia Orchestra
