= Louie (French TV series) =

French animated television series

- Didou, dessine-moi
- Genre: Preschool
- Created by: Isabeau Merle
- Based on: Louie by Yves Got
- Developed by: Isabeau Merle
- Voices of: Marceau Villand; Bonnie Lener
- Composers: Eduardo Makaroff; Paul Lazar; Shawn Lee
- Country of origin: France
- Original language: French
- No. of seasons: 3
- No. of episodes: 117

Production
- Running time: 7 minutes
- Production company: Millimages

Original release
- Network: France 5
- Release: February 12, 2006 – April 7, 2008

Louie (French: Didou, Dessine-Moi!) is a French animated television series produced by Millimages. The series is an adaptation based upon the work of Yves Got. The series was created and developed by Isabeau Merle and directed by Frédéric Mege, Frédérick Chaillou, and François Narboux. The original voice cast consists of Marceau Villand as Didou and Bonnie Lener as Sophie, whereas the English voice cast consists of Emma Tate as Louie, Shelley Longworth as Yoko, Matt Wilkinson as the male additional drawings, Sue Elliott Nicholls as the other drawings, and The Hot Kool Kids as off-screen voices.

The series aired on France 5 in Zouzous, Nickelodeon, Super RTL, Discovery Kids Latin America (whose Latin American rights passed to Nickelodeon itself, starting on August 6, 2012 - seven months after the Discovery Kids broadcast ended), Disney Channel, ABC, CITV, and CBeebies - the former aired the show from February 12, 2006, to April 7, 2008, with reruns airing until September 4, 2011.

A spin-off series, titled Louie & Yoko: Build! (French: Didou, Construis-Moi!), debuted on March 6, 2020, on the Okoo platform of France Télévisions.

== Episodes ==
Series	Episodes	Originally released	
Series	Episodes	First released	Last released
1	39	12 February 2006	2 April 2006
2	39	10 February 2007	2 April 2007
3	39	15 February 2008	7 April 2008
Specials		24 December 2011	12 May 2012

=== Series 1 (2006) ===
1. Louie, Draw Me a House (12 February 2006)
2. Louie, Draw Me a Snail (13 February 2006)
3. Louie, Draw Me a Camel (14 February 2006)
4. Louie, Draw Me a Dog (15 February 2006)
5. Louie, Draw Me a Flower (16 February 2006)
6. Louie, Draw Me a Rhinoceros (17 February 2006)
7. Louie, Draw Me a Penguin (19 February 2006)
8. Louie, Draw Me a Dolphin (20 February 2006)
9. Louie, Draw Me a Car (21 February 2006)
10. Louie, Draw Me a Boat (22 February 2006)
11. Louie, Draw Me a Dragon (23 February 2006)
12. Louie, Draw Me a Robot (24 February 2006)
13. Louie, Draw Me a Rocket (26 February 2006)
14. Louie, Draw Me an Ostrich (27 February 2006)
15. Louie, Draw Me a Crocodile (28 February 2006)
16. Louie, Draw Me a Sheep (1 March 2006)
17. Louie, Draw Me a Horse (2 March 2006)
18. Louie, Draw Me a Slide (5 March 2006)
19. Louie, Draw Me an Aeroplane (6 March 2006)
20. Louie, Draw Me a Cow (7 March 2006)
21. Louie, Draw Me a Chameleon (8 March 2006)
22. Louie, Draw Me a Kangaroo (9 March 2006
23. Louie, Draw Me an Elephant (12 March 2006)
24. Louie, Draw Me a Hot-Air Balloon (13 March 2006)
25. Louie, Draw Me a Fire Engine (14 March 2006)
26. Louie, Draw Me a Beaver (15 March 2006)
27. Louie, Draw Me a Frog (16 March 2006)
28. Louie, Draw Me a Squirrel (19 March 2006)
29. Louie, Draw Me a Tree (20 March 2006)
30. Louie, Draw Me a Cake (21 March 2006)
31. Louie, Draw Me a Castle (22 March 2006)
32. Louie, Draw Me a Sea Lion (23 March 2006)
33. Louie, Draw Me a Pelican (25 March 2006)
34. Louie, Draw Me a Piano (26 March 2006)
35. Louie, Draw Me a Reindeer (27 March 2006)
36. Louie, Draw Me a Monkey (28 March 2006)
37. Louie, Draw Me a Lion (29 March 2006)
38. Louie, Draw Me a Tractor (30 March 2006)
39. Louie, Draw Me a Train (2 April 2006)

=== Series 2 (2007) ===
1. Louie, Draw Me a Butterfly (10 February 2007)
2. Louie, Draw Me a Pig (11 February 2007)
3. Louie, Draw Me a Tow Truck (12 February 2007)
4. Louie, Draw Me a Scarecrow (13 February 2007)
5. Louie, Draw Me a Parrot (14 February 2007)
6. Louie, Draw Me a Giraffe (17 February 2007)
7. Louie, Draw Me a Hippopotamus (18 February 2007)
8. Louie, Draw Me a Lighthouse (19 February 2007)
9. Louie, Draw Me a Sledge (20 February 2007)
10. Louie, Draw Me a Mouse (21 February 2007)
11. Louie, Draw Me a Crane (24 February 2007)
12. Louie, Draw Me a Submarine (25 February 2007)
13. Louie, Draw Me a Koala (26 February 2007)
14. Louie, Draw Me a Wolf (27 February 2007)
15. Louie, Draw Me an Owl (28 February 2007)
16. Louie, Draw Me a Whale (3 March 2007)
17. Louie, Draw Me a Crab (4 March 2007)
18. Louie, Draw Me a Flying Saucer (5 March 2007)
19. Louie, Draw Me a Helicopter (6 March 2007)
20. Louie, Draw Me a Wheelbarrow (7 March 2007)
21. Louie, Draw Me a Merry-go-round (10 March 2007)
22. Louie, Draw Me an Octopus (11 March 2007)
23. Louie, Draw Me an Ibex (12 March 2007)
24. Louie, Draw Me a Dinosaur (13 March 2007)
25. Louie, Draw Me a Flamingo (14 March 2007)
26. Louie, Draw Me a Pirate Ship (17 March 2007)
27. Louie, Draw Me a Yeti (18 March 2007)
28. Louie, Draw Me a Cheetah (19 March 2007)
29. Louie, Draw Me a Bear (20 March 2007)
30. Louie, Draw Me a Mammoth (21 March 2007)
31. Louie, Draw Me a Carriage (24 March 2007)
32. Louie, Draw Me a Stagecoach (25 March 2007)
33. Louie, Draw Me a Stork (26 March 2007)
34. Louie, Draw Me a Cat (27 March 2007)
35. Louie, Draw Me a Polecat (28 March 2007)
36. Louie, Draw Me a Mole (31 March 2007)
37. Louie, Draw Me a Ghost (1 April 2007)
38. Louie, Draw Me a Witch (2 April 2007)

=== Series 3 (2008) ===
1. Louie, Draw Me a Pigeon (15 February 2008)
2. Louie, Draw Me a Loch Ness Monster (16 February 2008)
3. Louie, Draw Me a Narwhale (17 February 2008)
4. Louie, Draw Me an Igloo (18 February 2008)
5. Louie, Draw Me an Eagle (19 February 2008)
6. Louie, Draw Me a Spider (22 February 2008)
7. Louie, Draw Me a Pirate (23 February 2008)
8. Louie, Draw Me a Peacock (24 February 2008)
9. Louie, Draw Me a Tepee (25 February 2008)
10. Louie, Draw Me a Cockerel (26 February 2008)
11. Louie, Draw Me a Clown (1 March 2008)
12. Louie, Draw Me a Magpie (2 March 2008)
13. Louie, Draw Me a Saint-Bernard (3 March 2008)
14. Louie, Draw Me an Otter (4 March 2008)
15. Louie, Draw Me a Spectacled Cobra (5 March 2008)
16. Louie, Draw Me a Fairy (8 March 2008)
17. Louie, Draw Me a Scooter (9 March 2008)
18. Louie, Draw Me a Hang-glider (10 March 2008)
19. Louie, Draw Me a Panda (11 March 2008)
20. Louie, Draw Me a Tiger (12 March 2008)
21. Louie, Draw Me a Shark (15 March 2008)
22. Louie, Draw Me an Elf (16 March 2008)
23. Louie, Draw Me a Tortoise (17 March 2008)
24. Louie, Draw Me a Donkey (18 March 2008)
25. Louie, Draw Me a Liner (19 March 2008)
26. Louie, Draw Me an Antelope (21 March 2008)
27. Louie, Draw Me a Police Car (22 March 2008)
28. Louie, Draw Me a Christmas Tree (23 March 2008)
29. Louie, Draw Me a Hedgehog (24 March 2008)
30. Louie, Draw Me an Ambulance (25 March 2008)
31. Louie, Draw Me a Llama (26 March 2008)
32. Louie, Draw Me a Dustbin Lorry (29 March 2008)
33. Louie, Draw Me a Digger (30 March 2008)
34. Louie, Draw Me a Hovercraft (31 March 2008)
35. Louie, Draw Me an Ogre (1 April 2008)
36. Louie, Draw Me a Brown Bat (2 April 2008)
37. Louie, Draw Me a Genie (5 April 2008)
38. Louie, Draw Me a Caravan (6 April 2008)
39. Louie, Draw Me a Marmot (7 April 2008)

== Production ==
Didou is directed by Frédéric Mège, Frédérick Chaillou, François Narboux

- Producers: Roch Lener, Jonathan Peel, Marie-Caroline Villand
- Head of production: Marc Dhrami, Antoine Vimal, Séverine Modzelewski
- 1st assistants: Yann Popelier, Caroline Audebert
- Music: Eduardo Makaroff, Paul Lazar, Shawn Lee
- Storyboarders: Pierre Cerruti, Wilson Dos Santos, Mohamed Labidi, Eric Gosselet, Michael Armellino
- Background artists: Nicolas Viegeolat, Eric Gosselet, Delphine Huard, Pascal Badin
- Head of animation: François Narboux
- Animation: Capucine Latrasse, Christophe Calissoni, Barbara Maleville, Marie-Hélène Vernerie, Graziella Petrini, Sophie Dupont, Laetitia Dupont, Stéphane Cronier, Christophe N'Guyen, Maeva Saiz, Vang Xiong, Yannick Zanchetta
- Editing: Alain Lavallé, Thibaud Caquot
- Sound design: Bruno Guéraçague
- Sound mix: Bruno Mercère
