= Nicolás Behringer =

Argentine singer

- Born: Buenos Aires, Argentina
- Occupation: Singer
- Instrument: Vocals
- Years active: 2025–present

Nicolás Behringer is an Argentine singer. Predominantly known for infusing Latin elements into both pop and rock genres, he rose to fame in 2025 after winning the fifth season of La Voz Argentina as a part of Team Luck Ra. He became the first artist with a one-chair-turn to win the season in the history of the show.

== Early life ==
Behringer was born in Buenos Aires and began in music at a young age. Later, he began performing as a street performer to make money for him and his family. Six years prior to appearing on La Voz Argentina, Behringer's father died from diabetes and cardiorespiratory arrest. Behringer cites that his father pushed him to pursue music professionally. Following his father's death, he became the primary caretaker of his younger sister as Behringer stated that his father "was the only family bond [they] had and that's why [Behringer is his] sister's [guardian], and [his father] loved that [he] sang.

== Career ==
=== 2025–present: La Voz Argentina ===
In 2025, at the age of 28, Behringer auditioned for the fifth season of the reality competition show La Voz Argentina. In his audition, he performed "Prófugos" by Soda Stereo. Among the show's four vocal coaches (Lali Espósito, Luck Ra, Miranda!, and Soledad Pastorutti), only Luck Ra expressed interest in working with him by turning his chair towards Behringer. Behringer made it to the final of the competition where he won on 13 October 2025. Upon winning, Behringer received 70 million pesos, a Volkswagen Tera, and a recording contract with Universal Music Group.

Performances on La Voz Argentina season 5
Round	Song	Result
Blind Auditions	"Prófugos"	Luck Ra turned; defaulted to Team Luck Ra.
Battles	"Need You Now" vs. Ayélen Salina	Advanced to Knockouts
Knockouts	"Imágenes paganas" vs. Poppo Rigoli	Advanced to Playoffs
Playoffs	"Better Man"	Chosen by Public to Advance to Round One
Round One	"Mama, I'm Coming Home"	Advanced to Round Two
Round Two	"Nunca lo olvides"	Advanced to Round Three
Round Three	"Vuelve" vs. Thomas Dantas	Advanced to Round Four
Round Four	"Ala delta"	Advanced to Quarterfinal
Quarterfinal	"Honesty"	Advanced to Semifinal
Semifinal	"Is This Love"	Advanced to Final
Final	"Un pacto"	Winner
Final	"Que me falte todo" with Luck Ra	Winner

== Artistry ==
During his time on La Voz Argentina, Behringer sang in both English and Spanish. After his audition, he stated Elvis Presley, Queen, and Frank Sinatra as influences. He is classified as a pop and rock artist, covering uptempo songs.
