= Touch El Arab =

Swiss pop-electronica group

Touch El Arab was a pop-electronica group from Basel, Switzerland, formed by members Philippe Alioth, Christoph H. Müller and Stefan Hopmann. Their humorous song "Muhammar" was a major hit in Switzerland, France and Italy in 1987 and 1988. One member was Christoph H. Müller, who later founded Gotan Project. Another member was Katharina Németh, who later built the longest dahabeya on the Nile and operates it for tourist cruises.
