= Luck Ra =

Argentine singer

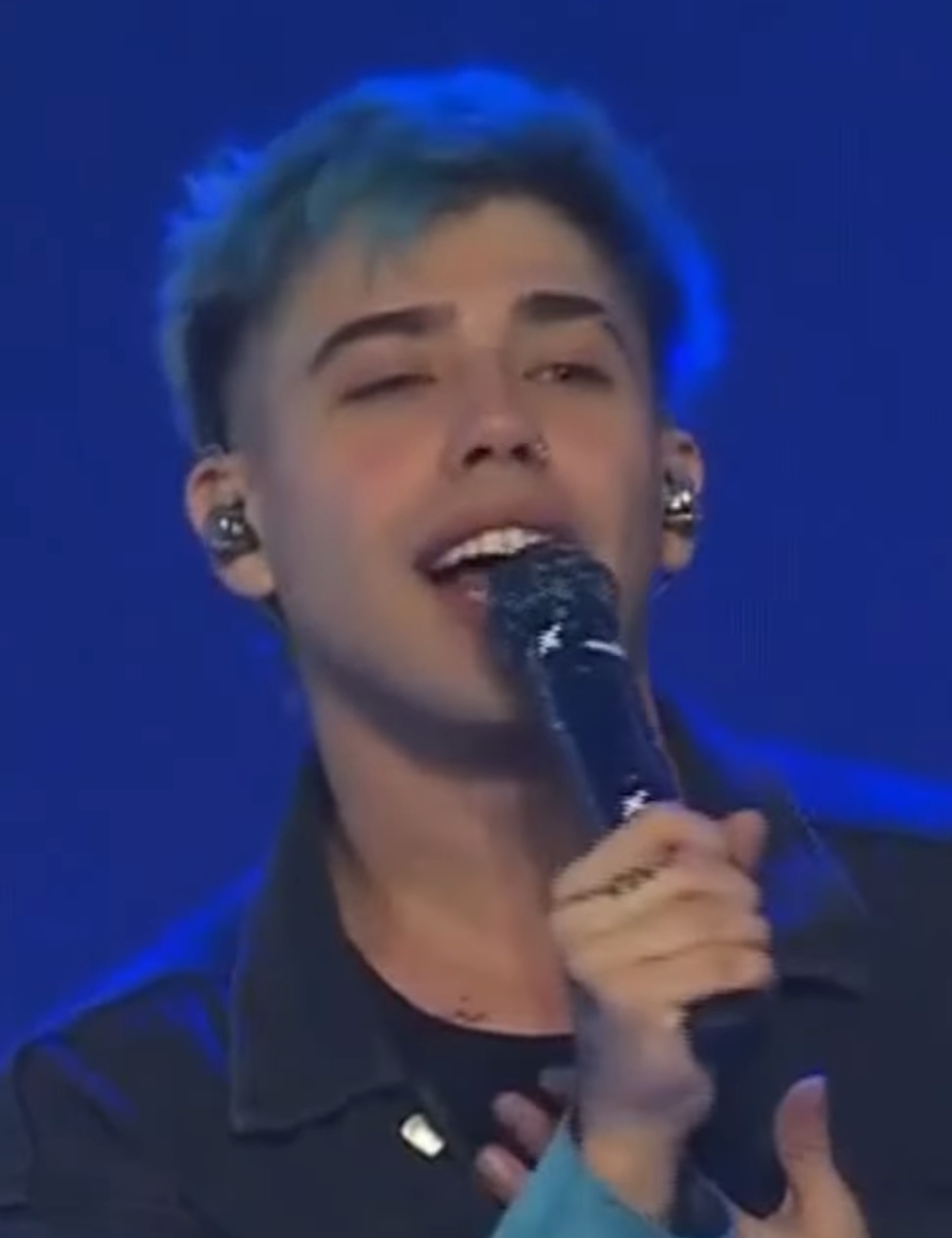
- Luck Ra in 2025

Background information
- Born: 20 February 1999 (age 27); Córdoba, Argentina
- Genres: Latin trap; reggaeton; cumbia
- Occupation: Singer
- Instruments: Vocals
- Years active: 2017–present
- Website: luck-ra.com

Juan Facundo Almenara Ordóñez (born 20 February 1999), better known by his stage name Luck Ra, is an Argentine singer. He began his career in 2017 following singing uploads on the digital platform YouTube. The remix of the single "No Quiero Más" with fellow trap artist Seven Kayne helped bolster Luck Ra to prominence in the music scene.

He gained further prominence in 2021 with his single "Te Mentiría" and has collaborated with numerous other artists in the cuarteto and cumbia scenes. His single "La Morocha", released in 2023, received positive reception and spent several weeks at the top of the Billboard Argentina charts.

== Career ==
=== 2017–2021: Career beginnings ===
Luck Ra began his career in 2017 on YouTube, uploading covers. On 23 May 2018, he released his first charting single, "No Quiero Más". The song was later remixed with Seven Kayne, another artist in the trap genre. In September 2018, Luck Ra signed a record deal with the label Panter Music and released the singles "Sola" and "La Clave".

In 2019, Luck Ra parted ways with his record label and began releasing music independently. Shortly after, he was featured on the remix of Rusherking's 2018 single "Ya No Me Extreñas". In February 2020, he released "Fuego", which was a collaboration with Rusherking. On 22 December 2020, Luck Ra released "Odio Amarte" which featured Lautaro López.

On 6 September 2021, Luck Ra released the single "El Campeón" which was the official song of the 2021 Copa América. Upon his song being chosen, Luck Ra stated that he was "…very happy to be the chosen one to make the theme of the champion. It refers to the cup and everything we go through to get there."

On 6 January 2022, Luck Ra released his first EP, Casaparlante en Argentina: Luck Ra, which features three singles: "Cuánto Vale", "Na Na Na", and "Te Mentiría" (which was released in 2021).

=== 2023–present: Further releases and La Voz Argentina coach ===
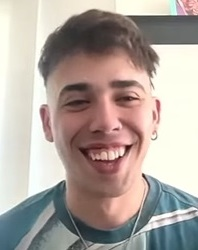
Luck Ra during an online interview in November 2023

In late 2023, Luck Ra recorded the single "La Morocha" which was met with critical acclaim. It spent several weeks topping the Billboard Argentina charts and many outlets deemed it the "Song of the Summer" in 2024.

Luck Ra released his debut album, Que nos falte todo, on 2 February 2024, which has eleven singles. The album became "Spotify's most-streamed album of 2024 in Argentina." On 27 December 2024, "Luck Ra: Bzrp Music Sessions, Vol. 61" was released, which features record producer Bizarrap. The song charted in several countries beyond Argentina, including Bolivia, Chile, Paraguay, Spain, and Uruguay.

On 10 April 2025, Luck Ra's second album, Qué sed, was released. The album has fourteen singles and Luck Ra described the album as "an expression of [his] roots, with an eye reaching international markets." In June 2025, he became a coach on the fifth season of La Voz Argentina alongside Soledad Pastorutti, Lali Espósito, and Miranda!. His final artist, Nicolás Behringer, won the season making Luck Ra the winning coach on his debut season.

== Personal life ==
Between 2024 and July 2026, Luck Ra was in a relationship with fellow singer La Joaqui. In 2025, during his role as a coach on La Voz Argentina, La Joaqui was featured as his team's advisor during the battle rounds.

On 29 July 2026, the couple confirmed their separation through a joint statement shared on their Instagram Stories, stating that the decision was mutual and not due to a lack of love, but rather differing plans for the future.

== Discography ==
=== Albums ===
- Que nos falte todo – 2024
- Qué sed – 2025

=== EPs ===
- Casaparlante en Argentina: Luck Ra – 2022
