= La Revancha del Tango =

Studio album by Gotan Project
- Released: 22 October 2001
- Recorded: 2001
- Genre: Electronica; tango; nu jazz
- Length: 58:43
- Label: XL; ¡Ya Basta!
- Producer: Philippe Cohen Solal; Christoph H. Müller; Eduardo Makaroff

Gotan Project chronology
La Revancha del Tango (2001)	Inspiración Espiración (2004)

Professional ratings
Review scores
Source	Rating
AllMusic	4/5 stars
Muzik	4/5
Rolling Stone	3/5 stars
San Francisco Chronicle	5/5 stars

La Revancha del Tango is the debut album by French musical group Gotan Project. It was released on 22 October 2001 on XL Recordings and ¡Ya Basta! Records.

The album contains a cover of the title track from Frank Zappa's 1970 album Chunga's Revenge and a cover of Gato Barbieri's theme for the 1972 film Last Tango in Paris.

== Legacy ==
The album was included in the book 1001 Albums You Must Hear Before You Die.

== Track listing ==
All tracks written by Philippe Cohen Solal, Christoph H. Müller and Eduardo Makaroff, except where indicated.

1. "Queremos Paz" – 5:15
2. "Época" – 4:28
3. "Chunga's Revenge" (Frank Zappa) – 5:02
4. "Tríptico" – 8:26
5. "Santa María (del Buen Ayre)" – 5:57
6. "Una Música Brutal" – 4:11
7. "El Capitalismo Foráneo" (Solal, Müller, Avelino Flores) – 6:13
8. "Last Tango in Paris" (Gato Barbieri) – 5:50
9. "La del Ruso" – 6:22
10. "Vuelvo al Sur" (Astor Piazzolla, Fernando E. Solanas) – 6:59

== Personnel ==
- Philippe Cohen Solal
- Christoph H. Müller
- Eduardo Makaroff

== Certifications ==
Region	Certification	Certified units/sales
Argentina (CAPIF)	2× Platinum	80,000^{^}
Belgium (BRMA)	Gold	25,000^{*}
Canada (Music Canada)	Gold	50,000^{‡}
France (SNEP)	Platinum	300,000^{*}
Germany	—	20,000
Italy (FIMI)	Gold	50,000^{*}
Poland (ZPAV)	Gold	20,000^{*}
Switzerland (IFPI Switzerland)	Gold	20,000^{^}
United Kingdom (BPI)	Gold	100,000^{^}
Summaries
Worldwide	—	1,000,000
^{*} Sales figures based on certification alone.^{^} Shipments figures based on certification alone.^{‡} Sales+streaming figures based on certification alone.
