= Koxmoz =

Argentine hip-hop/electronica group

Koxmoz is an Argentine hip-hop/electronica group that became famous worldwide after their collaboration on Gotan Project's single "Mi Confesión" from their second studio album, Lunatico.

Koxmoz was formed in 2002 by MC's Apolo Novax, Chili Parker and DJ Kox Tortuga, after the dissolution of their previous group: La Organizacion. La Organizacion, also known as La Oz, was a competition-rap group in Buenos Aires underground. However, their appeal was only for hardcore hip-hop fans and b-boys. After Mustafa Yoda left La Organizacion to pursue a solo career, DJ Kox Tortuga jumped from being a guest live DJ to be the main producer of the group and then Koxmoz was born.

DJ Kox Tortuga (also known as Tortuga and Kox-T) was a pioneer in the Argentine hip-hop scene, having been involved in many different projects since 1992 (Los Adolfos, SK84Life, Tumbas, Deep Taboo). He added his trademark cosmic/electro sound to the production of Koxmoz beats, hence transforming an orthodox hip-hop group into a progressive futuristic project that was easier to understand by the electronica audience than the hip-hop fans. As a result of that, Koxmoz became the ideal candidate to work with Gotan Project during 2005 for the production of the tango-rap hit "Mi Confesión".

Koxmoz has an album of their own, Tarde O Temprano, published independently in the United States (2006) and by EMI in Argentina (2007).
