= Line Kruse =

Line Kruse may refer to:

- Line Damkjær Kruse (born 1988), Danish basketball player
- Line Kruse (actress) (born 1975), Danish actress
- Line Kruse, a composer and violinist based in Paris who plays on albums by Gotan Project, including Lunático
