= Fémina =

Argentine folk and fusion trio

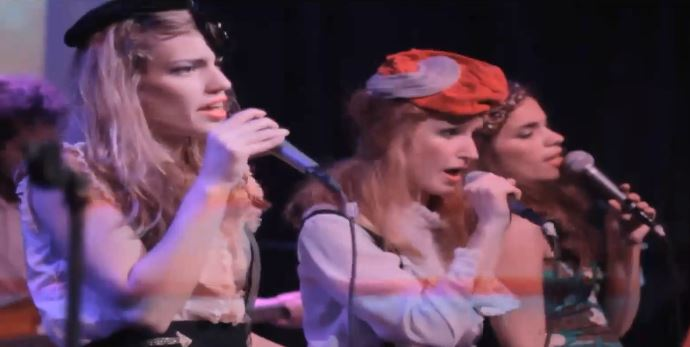
- Fémina in 2012 (from left to right: Sofía "Toti" Trucco, Clara Miglioli, and Clara "Wewi" Trucco)

Background information
- Origin: San Martín de los Andes, Argentina
- Genres: Hip hop; folk
- Years active: 2004-present
- Members: Clara "Wewi" Trucco (2008-present); Sofía "Toti" Trucco (2004-present)
- Past members: Clara Miglioli (2008-2022)
- Website: femina.bandcamp.com

Fémina is an Argentine folk and fusion trio from San Martín de los Andes, Argentina.

== Career ==
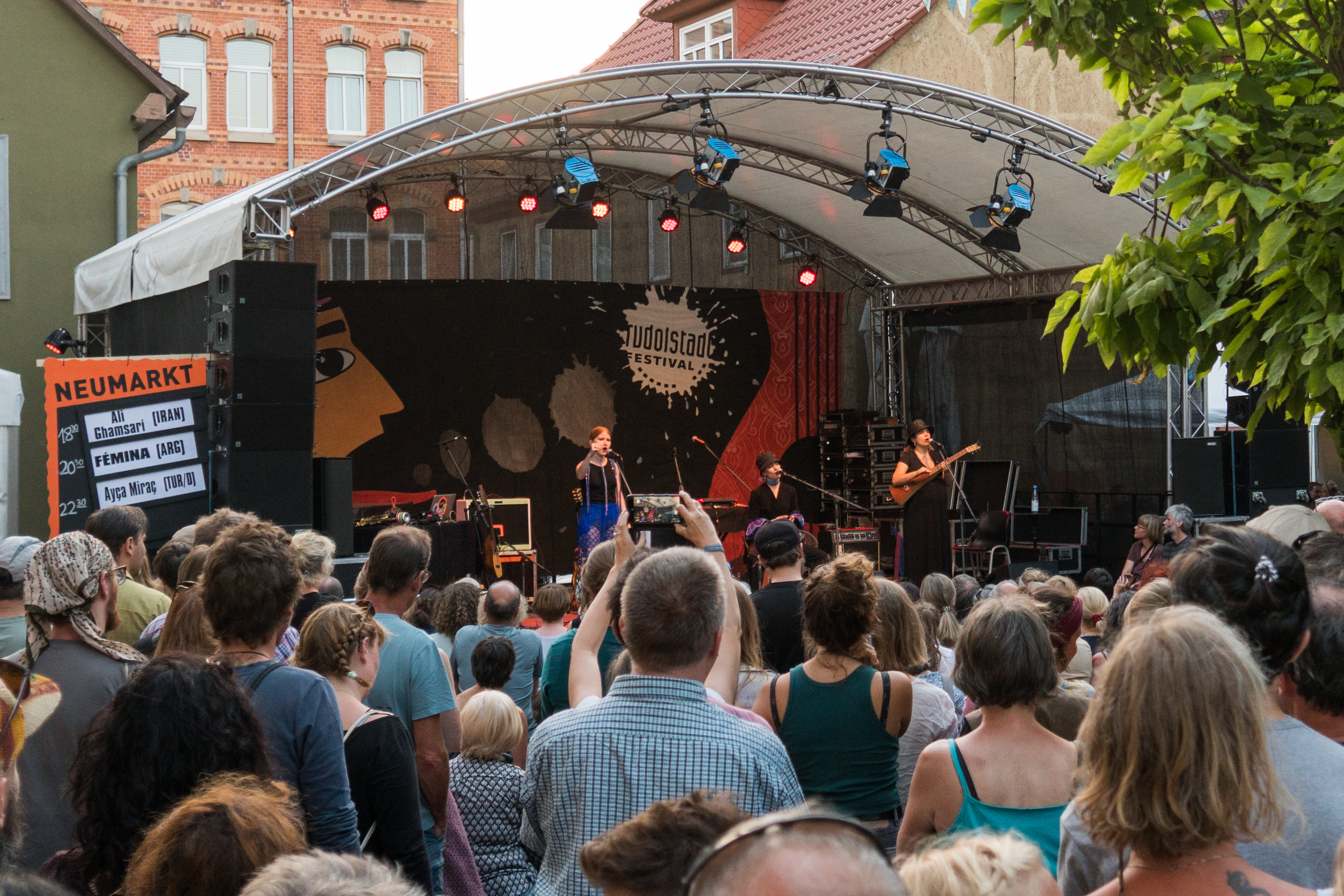
Fémina in 2019 at Rudolstadt-Festival, Germany

In 2004, friends Clara Miglioli and Sofía "Toti" Trucco formed Fémina in San Martín de los Andes, Argentina. The trio's name Fémina means female in Latin. The trio chose the name because they liked its sound and message. Band member Toti elaborated "there were not too many female rappers. It was a way to represent our girl." Miglioli met the Trucco sisters when she was four years old. After completing high school, the duo moved to Buenos Aires at the age of 19. They were later joined by Toti's younger sister Clara "Wewi" Trucco on percussion. There, they met and became friends with other rappers including Koxmoz and Apolo MC. In addition to music, both Miglioli and the Trucco sisters have a background in acting and vocal training. Fémina has toured in Latin America, Europe, and the United States. In 2018, they performed at the Sydney Festival in Australia. In an August 2017 interview with the Rolling Stone magazine, the group announced they are working on a new album with producer Quantic. Several tracks will feature Iggy Pop.

In 2022, Clara Miglioli left the band, and since then the band has been consolidated as a duo.

== Artistry ==
Their music often comprises harmonies and poetic rap in Spanish. Themes of their songs typically incorporate folklore, feminism, and Patagonia with an urban twist. In addition, messages of gender inequality, love, and unity can be found throughout their tracks. They were influenced by many artists including Clarice Lispector, Fernando Pessoa, The Roots, Pete Rock, Cypress Hill, and Lauryn Hill.

== Members ==
=== Current ===
- Sofía "Toti" Trucco (2004-present): Toti is 42–43 years old and was raised in San Martín de los Andes. After graduating from high school, she moved to Buenos Aires. Like her younger sister, Wewi, Toti is also a percussionist. She frequently incorporates flamenco cajón in their music. Toti is also a dancer. She is working on a project with Luis Maurette and is enrolled in a hip hop history and dance classes. Outside of Fémina, Toti performs in the Buenos Aires underground as Sof Tot. She recorded an unreleased EP with Uji who also goes by Luis Maurette of the band Lulacruza.
- Clara "Wewi" Trucco (2008-present): Wewi is 35–36 years old and was raised in San Martín de los Andes. She is the younger sister of Toti and the newest member of Fémina. Self described as a percussionist, Wewi plays the guitar and the Bolivian ronroco. She is also a visual artist and illustrator, who, at first, moved to Buenos Aires to pursue a career in the arts. Outside of Fémina, Wewi formed Weste, an indie folk band composed of herself and Uruguayan musician Igna Pérez. They released their debut album Visceras featuring a mixture of folk-rap and indie pop.

=== Former ===
- Clara Miglioli (2004-2022): Miglioli is 42–43 years old and was raised in San Martín de los Andes. Growing up in Patagonia, Miglioli learned about hip hop through watching video cassettes of MTV. She enjoyed lisining to Tupac Shakur and Cypress Hill. At the age of 19, Miglioli moved to Bueno Aires where she studied with actor Pompeyo Audivert who inspired her to write. She wrote poetry in addition to her participation in the band. Miglioli is the primary vocalist of Fémina. Outside of Fémina, Miglioli releases music under the name Claridad. She independently released a rap fusion solo album titled Sublimar. Together with her brother, Oli Miglioli, Clara formed the band Hermandad.

== Discography ==
=== Albums ===
Title	Album details
Deshice de mí	Release Date: 7 October 2011
Traspasa	Release Date: 2014
Perlas & Conchas	Release Date: 2019
