= Lunático =

Studio album by Gotan Project
- Released: 10 April 2006 (UK); 11 April 2006 (US)
- Recorded: 2004–2005
- Genres: Electronic, tango
- Length: 55:40
- Label: XL Recordings / ¡Ya Basta! records
- Producers: Philippe Cohen Solal, Christoph H. Müller and Eduardo Makaroff

Gotan Project chronology
Inspiración Espiración (2004)	Lunático (2006)	Tango 3.0 (2010)

Professional ratings
Review scores
Source	Rating
AllMusic	4/5 stars
BBC Collective	4/5 stars
Entertainment Weekly	(B)
The Guardian	3/5 stars
musicOMH	4/5 stars
NOW	(NNN)
The Observer	4/5 stars
Popmatters	(8/10)

Lunático is the second album by Gotan Project. It was released in 2006 by the Paris-based ¡Ya Basta! records, run by Philippe Cohen Solal. The album is named Lunático after the racehorse of legendary tango master Carlos Gardel.

The album features a collaboration with the American band Calexico recorded in Tucson, Arizona, and a cover of the Ry Cooder song "Paris, Texas." Recordings for the remainder of the album took place in Paris and Buenos Aires.

The first single off the album was "Diferente", the second single was "Mi Confesión". The third single was "La Vigüela".

== Track listing ==
1. "Amor Porteño" – 5:08
2. "Notas" – 4:21
3. "Diferente" – 5:23
4. "Celos" – 5:31
5. "Lunático" – 3:00
6. "Mi Confesión" – 4:20
7. "Tango Canción" – 4:23
8. "La Vigüela" – 5:00
9. "Criminal" – 3:35
10. "Arrabal" – 3:58
11. "Domingo" – 4:14
12. "Paris, Texas" – 6:46

== Personnel ==
Gotan Project:

- Philippe Cohen Solal – bass, keyboards, sounds & dub fx.
- Eduardo Makaroff – acoustic guitar.
- Christoph H. Müller – programming, bass, keyboards, speech synthesizer & fx.

Produced by: Christoph H. Müller, Eduardo Makaroff, Philippe Cohen. Mastering by Mandy Parnell @ Electric Mastering, London. Editing by Lionel Nicod @ Translab, Paris.

Paris recording sessions:

- Cristina Vilallonga – vocals
- Gustavo Beytelmann – piano
- Patrice Caratini – upright bass
- Nini Flores – bandoneon
- Line Kruse – violin (Note: Line Kruse is a Danish violinist and composer based in France. For others of this name, see Line Kruse (disambiguation).)
- Rudi Flores – acoustic guitar
- Nestor Marconi – bandoneon (track 2)
- Juan Carlos Cáceres – spoken word (track 2)
- Minine Garay – percussion (track 12)

Recorded and mixed @ Substudioz by Christoph H. Müller, Eduardo Makaroff and Philippe Cohen Solal

- Cyril Atef – drums (on tracks 4, 5 and 7)

Recorded @ Studio EGP by Georges Petillot

– Tango quartet arranged by Gustavo Beytelmann.

- Gustavo Beytelmann – piano
- JuanJo Mosalini – bandoneon
- Roberto Tormo – upright bass
- Victor Villena – bandoneon

Recorded @ Studio Acousti by Manu Payet

Buenos Aires recording sessions:

- Featuring rap performed by Koxmoz (Apolo Novax and Chili Parker) (track 6)
- Spoken word performed by Jimi Santos (track 11)

– Strings arranged and conducted by Gustavo Beytelmann.

- Pablo Agri – violin soloist
- Elías Khayat – 1st violin
- Leonardo Ferreyra, Lázaro Beker, Pablo Borzani, Pablo Sangiorgio, Raúl di Renzo, Roberto Calomarde – violin
- Alexandre Jakovlev, Benjamín Bru Pesce, Eduardo-Felix Peroni – viola
- Jorge Pérez Tedesco, María Eugenia Castro – Cello
- Daniel Falasca – double bass
- Facundo Guevara – percussion
- Henry Richard Bay – trombone

Recorded @ Studio ION in March 2005. Sound engineer: Jorge da Silva Sound assistant: Ariel Lavigna Pro Tools engineer: Javier Mazzarol

- Cafe Tortoni sounds on 'Celos' recorded by Emmanuelle Honorin

Calexico recording sessions (on "Amor Porteño"):

- Joey Burnes – vibes, upright bass, electric bass, electric guitar
- John Convertino – drums

Recorded @ Wavelab Studio, Tucson, Arizona by Chris Schultz

Music composed by: Philippe Cohen Solal, Eduardo Makaroff and Christoph H. Müller except track 2 composed by Philippe Cohen Solal and Christoph H. Müller and track 12 composed by Ry Cooder

Lyrics by: Eduardo Makaroff on tracks 1–4. 7 and 10, Lucas Lapalma and Diego Gaston Ponce on track 6, Gotan Project on track 11

== Chart positions ==
=== Weekly ===
Chart (2006–2007)	Peak position
Australian Albums (ARIA)	47
Austrian Albums (Ö3 Austria)	14
Belgian Albums (Ultratop Flanders)	3
Belgian Alternative Albums (Ultratop Flanders)	2
Belgian Albums (Ultratop Wallonia)	11
Belgian Mid-price Albums (Ultratop Wallonia)	7
Croatian International Albums (HDU)	1
Dutch Albums (Album Top 100)	40
Dutch Alternative Albums (Mega Alternative Top 30)	2
Finnish Albums (Suomen virallinen lista)	23
French Albums (SNEP)	6
German Albums (Offizielle Top 100)	56
Italian Albums (FIMI)	4
New Zealand Albums (RMNZ)	21
Norwegian Albums (VG-lista)	8
Scottish Albums (Official Charts)	91
Spanish Albums (Promusicae)	57
Swedish Albums (Sverigetopplistan)	51
Swiss Albums (Schweizer Hitparade)	3
UK Albums (Official Charts)	66
UK Dance Albums (Official Charts)	3
UK Independent Albums (Official Charts)	6
US Top Dance Albums (Billboard)	7
US Independent Albums (Billboard)	40
US Heatseekers Albums (Billboard)	26
US World Albums (Billboard)	2

=== Year-end ===
Chart (2006)	Position
Belgian Albums (Ultratop Flanders)	55
Belgian Alternative Albums (Ultratop Flanders)	32
Belgian Albums (Ultratop Wallonia)	85
Swiss Albums (Schweizer Hitparade)	63
US World Albums (Billboard)	4

== Certifications ==
Region	Certification	Certified units/sales
Argentina (CAPIF)	Gold	20,000^{^}
Belgium (BRMA)	Gold	15,000^{*}
France (SNEP)	Gold	75,000^{*}
Italy (FIMI)	Gold	40,000^{*}
Poland (ZPAV)	Gold	10,000^{*}
^{*} Sales figures based on certification alone.^{^} Shipments figures based on certification alone.
