= Sebastian Volco =

Argentinian composer

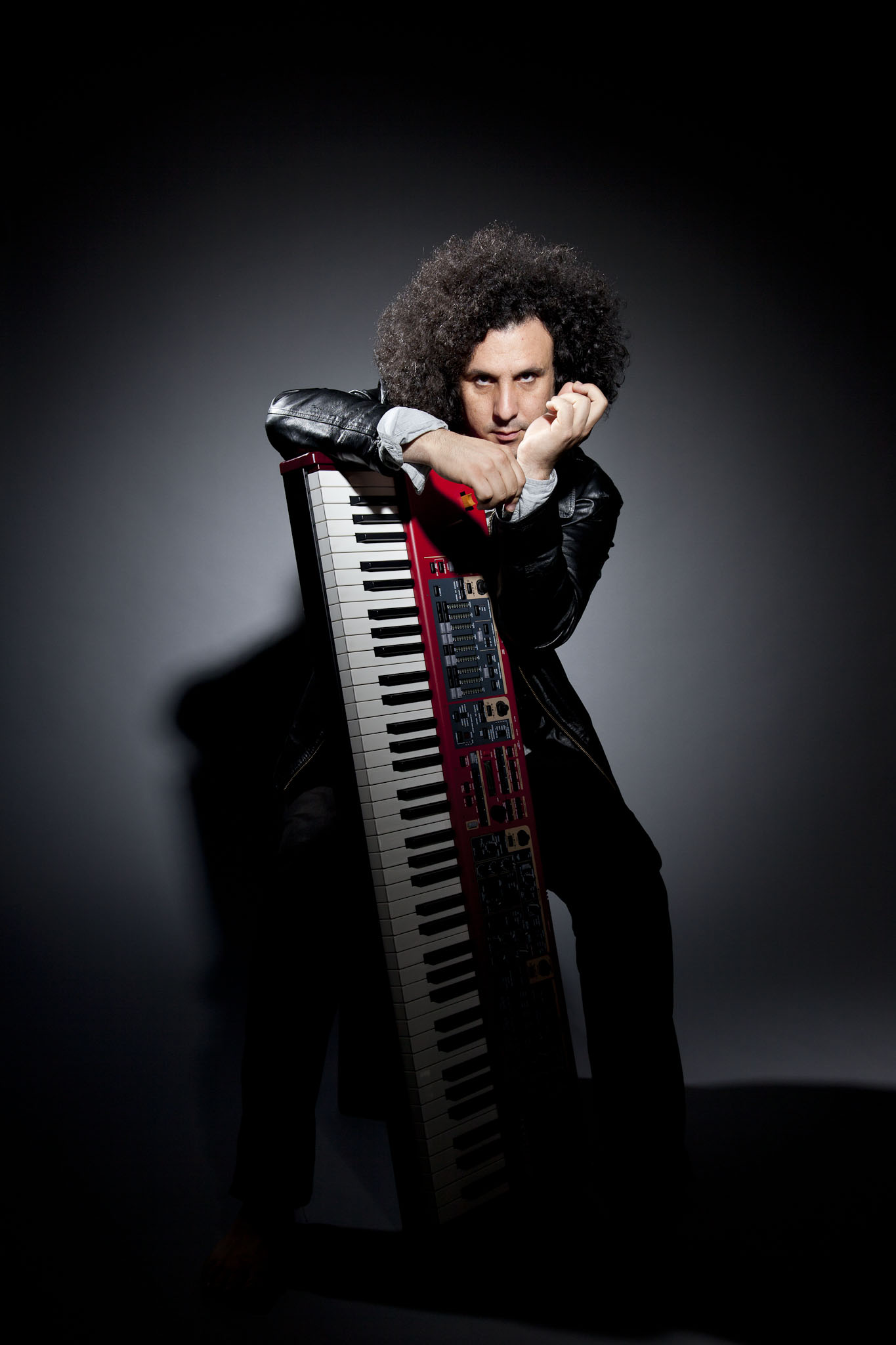
Sebastian Volco

Sebastian Volco (also known as Volco) (Buenos Aires, 1973) is an Argentine composer, musician, singer-songwriter and record producer. He formed La Orquesta Metafísica, a rock group that puts together influences from rock, tango, jazz, classical music and traditional Argentine rhythms plus the duo Volco & Gignoli with bandoneon player Pablo Gignoli, and many other solo and group projects.

Recognized for his career in experimental and rock music, he also emphasizes his role as a composer of works for cinema, theater, performance and music for ballet.

== History ==
=== La Trova de Fin de Siglo ===
One of Sebastián Volco's main projects was the creation in 1997 with Sebastián Rosenfeldt of La Trova de Fin de Siglo, a group of experimental rock, improvised and electronic music. With this band he performed numerous concerts in Buenos Aires. During a year, he held a multitude of jam sessions at the now extinct concert venue Planeta Jupiter, where participated artists such as Charly García and Pappo, the legendary rock and blues guitarist.

In 1998, he ran as producer and booker, the Evenos Club in association with the blues legend and rock pioneer Javier Martínez (member of the Manal group).

With La Trova de Fin de Siglo he recorded Reboot 144, an album composed for the contemporary dance work Other Parts of Brenda Angiel which was presented in 1997 at the Rojas Cultural Center in Buenos Aires.

=== Underground movement in Buenos Aires (1999-2012) ===
In the late 90s, he participated actively with contemporary music composers such as Santiago Santero, Gustavo Ribicic, Claudio Baron, among others.

Between 1999 and 2008, Sebastián Volco composed, recorded and produced in Buenos Aires 5 solo rock and pop albums. During this period, he directed several bands. In those albums a plenty of artists participated: Tweety González, Alina Gandini, Santiago Vázquez, Sami Abadi, Fernando Samalea, Emmanuel Cauvet, Gori to name a few.

At the beginning of the 2000s, as a producer, he was in charge of the first album of the Mataplantas band.

From 2007 to 2011, he was part of the punk-folk-psychedelic group Fantasmagoria. With this group, he toured Argentina and Uruguay in hundreds of live presentations. He was part of several of Pablo Dacal's bands and recorded the albums of La Orquesta de Salón, El Progreso and Baila sobre Fuego.

As a musician, he was part of several groups and participated in recordings with Pablo Dacal, Fena Della Maggiora, Javier Martinez, Mataplantas, La Trova de Fin de Siglo, Sami Abadi, Duo Candela, Santiago Santero, Gustavo Ribicic, Claudio Baroni, Pablo Krantz, Pat Coria, Salvet...

"Buena vida Delivery” is his most remarkable work as a composer of cinema, ballet and installations. This piece received the Astor Award at the Mar del Plata Film Festival in 2004. In 2001, he produced the music of the "Corte 7" installation at the Museum of Fine Arts in Buenos Aires.

For the work of contemporary dance Other Parts of Brenda Angiel, he recorded Reboot 144, a piece that he created with La Trova de Fin de Siglo and it was presented in 1997 at the Rojas Cultural Center in Buenos Aires.

=== La Orquesta Metafisica ===
In 2009, together with Sebastian Rosenfeldt, he formed La Orquesta Metafísica, an ensemble that shows the diversity of music in Buenos Aires: rock, tango, Jazz and classical music merged into an original sound.

With La Orquesta Metafísica he performed more than 100 concerts in Buenos Aires, France and New York. His debut album is a work composed by Volco called "7 Movements", where citizen music is mixed with philosophical and existential ideas and concepts. In 2014, The Metaphysical Orchestra set up its offices in France, where they continue to develop their multimedia shows, incorporating painters, dancers, photographers and filmmakers into the orchestra. In 2018, they released with the French label Tac Faubourg Du Monde, their second album Hypnotized.

=== Volco & Gignoli ===
In 2013, in association with Pablo Gignoli, he created the piano and bandoneon duo of modern tango "Volco & Gignoli" with whom he has made countless tours of Europe (France, Germany, Portugal, Switzerland, Luxembourg, Budapest, Poland), United Arab Emirates and the United States. Also with the duo he participated in tours and recordings with Gotan Project founders Muller and Makaroff.

=== Today live projects ===
He is currently developing a solo performance combining piano and electronic devices, while also leading a modern ensemble in trio or quartet formats, incorporating violin, percussion, or bandoneón.

His discographic production remains prolific, and in 2024, he is recording an album titled Sebastian Volco Trio and filming a documentary about the project in Switzerland.

In parallel, his work as a producer and creator of performances continues.

== Discography ==
=== As solo artist ===
- 1999:Liquidándome en el agua
- 2001: Coqueteo electrónicos
- 2003: Pájaros sin patas
- 2006: Ritual
- 2007: Fiebre de rock and Roll
- 2012: "Un regalo misterioso"
- 2017: "Milagro y Arco Iris"
- 2017: "Suite descerebrada”
- 2020: "Selection of experimental, strange and beautiful ambient music ”
- 2020: "Civilizacion Demonio"
- 2020: "Living Inside"
- 2021: "Alien" (with Sebastian Rosenfeldt)
- 2022: "Awakening Ray"
- 2022: "The relentless advance of stupidity -chapter I"
- 2023: "The relentless advance of stupidity - full album"

=== With la Orquesta Metafísica ===
- 1995: La trova de fin de siglo
- 2011: "Orquesta Metafísica, 7 Movimientos"
- 2018: "Hipnotizados" (Tac Faubourg Du Monde)

=== With Volco y Gignoli ===
- 2013: "Volco & Gignoli"
- 2021: "Volco & Gignoli + Samalea"
