= Hilda Lizarazu =

Argentine singer and composer

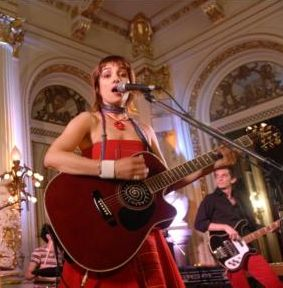
Hilda Lizarazu performing at the Salón Blanco of the Casa Rosada

Hilda María del Pilar Lizarazu (born 12 October 1963), known as Hilda Lizarazu, is an Argentine rock and roll singer and composer.

== Life ==
Lizarazu was born in Curuzú Cuatiá, Corrientes. Between 1988 and 1999, she was the main vocalist and keyboards in the duo Man Ray, with guitarist Tito Losavio. At the same time she was a vocalist in Charly García's ensemble. She left Man Ray after the album Larga distancia (1999), and released her first solo album, Gabinete de curiosidades, in 2004.

Lizarazu played the part of a police expert in the 1995 Argentinian movie Geisha.
