= Tango 3.0 =

Studio album by Gotan Project
- Released: 20 April 2010
- Recorded: 2009–2010; SubstudioZ and Studio Acousti (Paris, France); The Music Shed (New Orleans, United States); Buenos Aires, Argentina
- Genre: Neotango/Electronica
- Length: 44:24
- Language: Spanish
- Label: XL Recordings
- Producers: Philippe Cohen Solal, Christoph H. Müller and Eduardo Makaroff.

Gotan Project chronology
Lunático (2006)	Tango 3.0 (2010)

Professional ratings
Review scores
Source	Rating
AllMusic	4/5 stars

Tango 3.0 is the third album by the electronic band Gotan Project. It was released in 2010 on ¡Ya Basta! Records under license from XL Recordings for the UK and US market, and Universal Music in the rest of the world.

== Track listing ==
1. "Tango Square" – 3:46
2. "Rayuela" – 4:27
3. "Desilusión" – 4:24
4. "Peligro" – 3:57
5. "La Gloria" – 3:47
6. "Mil Millones" – 5:49
7. "Tu Misterio" – 3:21 (featuring Daniel Melingo)
8. "De Hombre a Hombre" – 3:25
9. "El Mensajero" – 2:35
10. "Panamericana" – 4:33
11. "Érase Una Vez" – 4:20

== Personnel (from the deluxe edition) ==
- Philippe Cohen Solal - electric guitar, bass, keyboards, whistle, dub FX
- Eduardo Makaroff - acoustic and electric guitar
- Christoph H. Müller - bass, keyboards, tenori-on, vocoders, programming, dub FX
- Cristina Vilallonga - vocals

=== Additional personnel ===
- Gustavo Beytelmann - piano.
- Nini Flores - bandoneon.
- Rodrigo Guerra - musical saw, mandolin.
- Dr. John - Hammond B3 organ (on "Tango Square").
- Line Kruse - violin (Note: Line Kruse is a Danish violinist and composer based in France. For others of this name, see Line Kruse (disambiguation).)
- Franco Luciani - harmonica.
- Daniel Melingo - vocals and clarinet on "Tu Misterio".
- Victor Hugo Morales - soccer commentator (relator de fútbol) on "La Gloria".
- Rudi Flores - acoustic guitar
- Romain Lecuyer - double-bass
- Cecile Audebert - harp

=== Strings and horns arranged and conducted by Gustavo Beytelmann ===
- Cyril Garac (leader), Corine Auclin, Noelle Barbereau, Véronique Bohn, David Braccini, Michel Dietz, David Galoustov, Nicolas Gros, Philippe Huynh: violins
- Francoise Bordenave, Cécile Brossard, Sébastien Levy: violas
- Lionel Allemand, Etienne Samuel: cellos
- Cécile Audebert: harp
- Claude Egéa: trumpet
- Denis Leloup: trombone
- André Villeger, Rémi Sciuto: saxophones

=== Children's choir on Rayuela ===
- Emilia Fullana, María & Miguel Makaroff, Maylis & Noela Müller, Pablo Muñoz, Inés Salamanca, Maria Paulina Spucches, Mateo & Rafael Rodriguez

=== Children's choir directed by ===
- Sandra Rumolino

=== Technical personnel ===
- Gotan Project: production, composition, engineering and mixing (at Substudioz)
- Didier Pouydesseau: engineering (at Studio Acousti)
- Chris Finney: engineering for Dr. John (at The Music Shed)
- Laurent Jais: engineering for Daniel Melingo (at Studio Acousti)
- Greg Calbi: mastering (at Sterling Sound, New York)
- Benjamin Joubert: editing (at Translab, Paris)

=== Additional information ===
- All music composed by Gotan Project.
- Lyrics by Eduardo Makaroff on tracks 3, 6 & 7; 5, 7 & 16 by Sergio Makaroff on tracks 4 & 9, by Philippe Cohen Solal & Eduardo Makaroff on tracks 10 & 11, by Gotan Project on track 2 (deluxe edition)
- All tracks published by Science & Melodie Publishing
- "Rayuela" contains parts of readings by Julio Cortázar of his book "Rayuela" (from "Voz Viva de America Latina") and of "Preámbulo a las Instrucciones para dar Cuerda al Reloj", used by kind permission of Agencia Literaria Carmen Balcells, UNAM, La Casa de las Américas

== Chart positions ==
=== Weekly charts ===
Chart (2010–2011)	Peak position
Austrian Albums (Ö3 Austria)	12
Belgian Albums (Ultratop Flanders)	3
Belgian Albums (Ultratop Wallonia)	7
Dutch Albums (Album Top 100)	40
French Albums (SNEP)	4
German Albums (Offizielle Top 100)	41
Hungarian Albums (MAHASZ)	40
Italian Albums (FIMI)	8
New Zealand Albums (RMNZ)	27
Norwegian Albums (VG-lista)	25
Swiss Albums (Schweizer Hitparade)	6
UK Albums (Official Charts)	61
UK Dance Albums (Official Charts)	8
UK Independent Albums (Official Charts)	3
US Top Dance Albums (Billboard)	6
US Heatseekers Albums (Billboard)	14
US World Albums (Billboard)	2

=== Year-end charts ===
Chart (2010)	Position
Belgian Albums (Ultratop Flanders)	87
Belgian Albums (Ultratop Wallonia)	80
French Albums (SNEP)	47
Swiss Albums (Schweizer Hitparade)	88
US World Albums (Billboard)	15

== Certifications ==
Region	Certification	Certified units/sales
France (SNEP)	Platinum	100,000^{*}
^{*} Sales figures based on certification alone.
