= Gotan Project =

French musical group

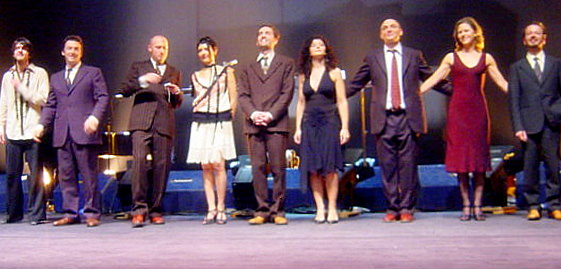
- At the end of a concert in Porto (Portugal), 2003

Background information
- Origin: Buenos Aires, Argentina; Paris, France
- Genres: Neotango; electronica; tango
- Years active: 1999–present
- Label: Ya Basta
- Members: Eduardo Makaroff; Christoph H. Müller; Philippe Cohen Solal
- Website: gotanproject.com

Gotan Project is a Franco-Swiss-Argentine musical group based in Paris, France, consisting of musicians Eduardo Makaroff (Argentinian), Philippe Cohen Solal (French) and Christoph H. Müller (Swiss), a former member of Touch El Arab.

== History ==
Gotan Project formed in 1999. Their first release was "Vuelvo Al Sur/El Capitalismo Foráneo" in 2000, quickly followed by the album La Revancha del Tango in 2001. Their music is based on Argentine tango, but also uses elements such as samples, beats, and breaks.

Live material was broadcast on Gilles Peterson's world music show Worldwide on BBC Radio 1 in May 2004. The band has also released a DJ set: Inspiración Espiración - A Gotan Project DJ Set Selected & Mixed by Philippe Cohen Solal (2004). This album is a compilation of classic tangos from the likes of Aníbal Troilo, Ástor Piazzolla and Gotan Project remixes. The album also includes a bonus CD with the track "La Cruz del Sur" – which was meant to be included on La Revancha del Tango, but did not make the cut in 2001.

In 2006 they released a second studio album, Lunático, and in 2010 Tango 3.0, their last studio album to date.

== Band name ==
The name of the trio is the word "tango" with the order of its syllables reversed. Reversing syllables in this way is a form of word play called "al vesre" that is common in Lunfardo, an argot of Rioplatense Spanish.

== Discography ==
- La Revancha del Tango (2001)
- Lunático (2006)
- Tango 3.0 (2010)

== Commercial use ==
The song "Santa Maria (del Buen Ayre)" was used in the films The Bourne Identity (2002), Shall We Dance? (2004), and Knight and Day (2010).
