= List of crime films of the 1940s =

This is a list of crime films released in the 1940s.

Title	Director	Cast	Country	Notes
1940
The Bank Dick	Edward F. Cline	W. C. Fields, Cora Witherspoon, Una Merkel	United States	Crime comedy
The Fatal Hour	William Nigh	Boris Karloff, Grant Withers, Marjorie Reynolds	United States	
The House Across the Bay	Archie Mayo	George Raft, Joan Bennett, Lloyd Nolan	United States	
1941
High Sierra	Raoul Walsh	Humphrey Bogart, Ida Lupino, Arthur Kennedy	United States	
Invisible Ghost	Joseph H. Lewis	Bela Lugosi, Polly Ann Young, John McGuire	United States	
1942
Gang Busters	Noel Smith, Ray Taylor	Robert Armstrong, Joseph Crehan	United States	Film serial
Larceny, Inc.	Lloyd Bacon	Edward G. Robinson, Jane Wyman, Broderick Crawford	United States	
Moontide	Fritz Lang, Archie Mayo	Jean Gabin, Ida Lupino, Thomas Mitchell	United States	Crime drama
This Gun for Hire	Frank Tuttle	Veronica Lake, Robert Preston, Laird Cregar	United States	
1943
The Chance of a Lifetime	William Castle	Chester Morris, Erik Rolf, Jeanne Bates	United States	
G-Men vs The Black Dragon	William Witney	Hooper Atchley, Harry Burns, Rod Cameron	United States	
It Happened at the Inn	Jacques Becker	Fernand Ledoux, Georges Rollin, Blanchette Brunoy	France	Crime drama
Ossessione	Luchino Visconti	Clara Calamai, Massimo Girotti, Juan de Landa	Italy	Crime drama
1944
Bluebeard	Edgar G. Ulmer	John Carradine, Jean Parker, Nils Asther	United States	
Delinquent Daughters	Albert Herman	Fifi D'Orsay, Teala Loring, Mary Bovard	United States	
Double Indemnity	Billy Wilder	Fred MacMurray, Barbara Stanwyck, Edward G. Robinson	United States	
The Woman in the Window	Fritz Lang	Edward G. Robinson, Joan Bennett, Raymond Massey	United States	Crime drama
1945
Crime, Inc.	Lew Landers	Leo Carrillo, Tom Neal, Martha Tilton	United States	
Detour	Edgar G. Ulmer	Tom Neal, Ann Savage, Claudia Drake	United States	
Federal Operator 99	Spencer Gordon Bennet, Yakima Canutt, Wallace A. Grissell		United States	
Mildred Pierce	Michael Curtiz	Joan Crawford, Jack Carson, Zachary Scott	United States	Crime drama
Pillow of Death	Wallace W. Fox	Lon Chaney Jr., Brenda Joyce, Clara Blandick	United States	
Scarlet Street	Fritz Lang	Edward G. Robinson, Joan Bennett, Dan Duryea	United States	
1946
The Blue Dahlia	George Marshall	Alan Ladd, Veronica Lake, William Bendix	United States	Crime thriller
Copie conforme	Jean Dréville	Louis Jouvet, Suzy Delair, Annette Poivre	France	Crime comedy
The Dark Mirror	Robert Siodmak	Olivia de Havilland, Lew Ayres, Thomas Mitchell	United States	Crime thriller
Just Before Dawn	William Castle	Charles Arnt, Robert Barrat	United States	
The Killers	Robert Siodmak	Burt Lancaster, Ava Gardner, Edmond O'Brien	United States	
Panic (Panique)	Julien Duvivier	Michel Simon, Viviane Romance, Paul Bernard	France	Crime drama
The Postman Always Rings Twice	Tay Garnett	Lana Turner, John Garfield, Cecil Kellaway	United States	
1947
Boomerang	Elia Kazan	Dana Andrews, E.J. Ballantine, Jane Wyatt	United States	Crime drama
Born to Kill	Robert Wise	Lawrence Tierney, Claire Trevor, Walter Slezak	United States	
Brute Force	Jules Dassin	Burt Lancaster, Hume Cronyn, Charles Bickford	United States	Prison film
The Devil Thumbs a Ride	Felix E. Feist	Lawrence Tierney, Ted North, Nan Leslie	United States	
Kiss of Death	Henry Hathaway	Victor Mature, Brian Donlevy, Coleen Gray	United States	Crime thriller
The Long Night	Anatole Litvak	Henry Fonda, Barbara Bel Geddes, Vincent Price	United States	Crime drama
Monsieur Verdoux	Charles Chaplin	Charles Chaplin, Ada-May, Marjorie Bennett	United States	Crime comedy
Nightmare Alley	Edmund Goulding	Tyrone Power, Coleen Gray, Joan Blondell	United States	Crime drama
Out of the Past	Jacques Tourneur	Robert Mitchum, Jane Greer, Kirk Douglas	United States	
Quai des Orfèvres	Henri-Georges Clouzot	Louis Jouvet, Bernard Blier, Suzy Delair	France	Crime drama
Ride the Pink Horse	Robert Montgomery	Robert Montgomery, Wanda Hendrix, Rita Conde	United States	
T-Men	Anthony Mann	Dennis O'Keefe, Mary Meade, Charles McGraw	United States	
They Won't Believe Me	Irving Pichel	Robert Young, Susan Hayward, Rita Johnson	United States	
The Web	Michael Gordon	Vincent Price, Ella Raines, Edmond O'Brien	United States	
1948
Au-delà des grilles	René Clément	Jean Gabin, Isa Miranda, Andrea Checchi	France; Italy	Crime drama
Brass Monkey	Thornton Freeland	Avril Angers. Henry Edwards, Carroll Levis	United Kingdom	
Cry of the City	Robert Siodmak	Victor Mature, Richard Conte, Fred Clark	United States	
Dedee d'Anvers	Yves Allégret	Simone Signoret, Marcello Pagliero, Bernard Blier	France	Crime drama
Drunken Angel	Akira Kurosawa	Toshiro Mifune, Takashi Shimura, Reizaburo Yamamoto	Japan	Crime drama
Force of Evil	Abraham Polonsky	John Garfield, Thomas Gomez, Marie Windsor	United States	Crime drama
He Walked by Night	Alfred L. Werker	Richard Basehart, Scott Brady, Roy Roberts	United States	Crime thriller
Hollow Triumph	Steve Sekely	Paul Henreid, Joan Bennett, Eduard Franz	United States	
Key Largo	John Huston	Humphrey Bogart, Edward G. Robinson, Monte Blue	United States	
Noose	Edmond T. Gréville	Carole Landis, Joseph Calleia, Derek Farr	United Kingdom	
Raw Deal	Anthony Mann	Dennis O'Keefe, Claire Trevor, Marsha Hunt	United States	
Road House	Jean Negulesco	Ida Lupino, Cornel Wilde	United States	Crime drama
The Naked City	Jules Dassin	Barry Fitzgerald, Howard Duff, Dorothy Hart	United States	Crime drama
1949
The Bribe	Robert Z. Leonard	Robert Taylor, Ava Gardner, Charles Laughton	United States	
Criss Cross	Robert Siodmak	Burt Lancaster, Yvonne De Carlo, Dan Duryea	United States	
Kind Hearts and Coronets	Robert Hamer	Dennis Price, Alec Guinness, Valerie Hobson	United Kingdom	
The Devil's Henchman	Seymour Friedman	Warner Baxter, Al Bridge, Ken Christy	United States	
Entre onze heures et minuit	Henri Decoin	Louis Jouvet, Madeleine Robinson, Monique Melinand	France	
The File on Thelma Jordon	Robert Siodmak	Barbara Stanwyck, Wendell Corey, Paul Kelly	United States	
Johnny Stool Pigeon	William Castle	Howard Duff, Shelley Winters, Dan Duryea	United States	
Port of New York	Laslo Benedek	Scott Brady, Richard Rober, K.T. Stevens	United States	
The Reckless Moment	Max Ophüls	James Mason, Joan Bennett, Geraldine Brooks	United States	Crime drama
Red Light	Roy Del Ruth	George Raft, Virginia Mayo, Raymond Burr	United States	
They Live by Night	Nicholas Ray	Cathy O'Donnell, Farley Granger, Howard Da Silva	United States	Crime drama
Too Late for Tears	Byron Haskin	Lizabeth Scott, Don DeFore, Dan Duryea	United States	
Under Capricorn	Alfred Hitchcock	Ingrid Bergman, Joseph Cotten, Michael Wilding	United Kingdom	Crime drama
Une si jolie petite plage	Yves Allégret	Gérard Philipe, Madeleine Robinson, Jean Servais	France	Crime drama
White Heat	Raoul Walsh	James Cagney, Virginia Mayo, Edmond O'Brien	United States	
