= Philipe (surname) =

Philipe is a surname. Notable people with the surname include:

- Anne Philipe (1917–1990), French writer, ethnologist, and documentary filmmaker.
- Gérard Philipe (1922–1959), French actor.
- Sam Philipe (fl. 1989), Israeli sculptor
