= Gabriel Gobin =

Belgian actor (1903–1998)

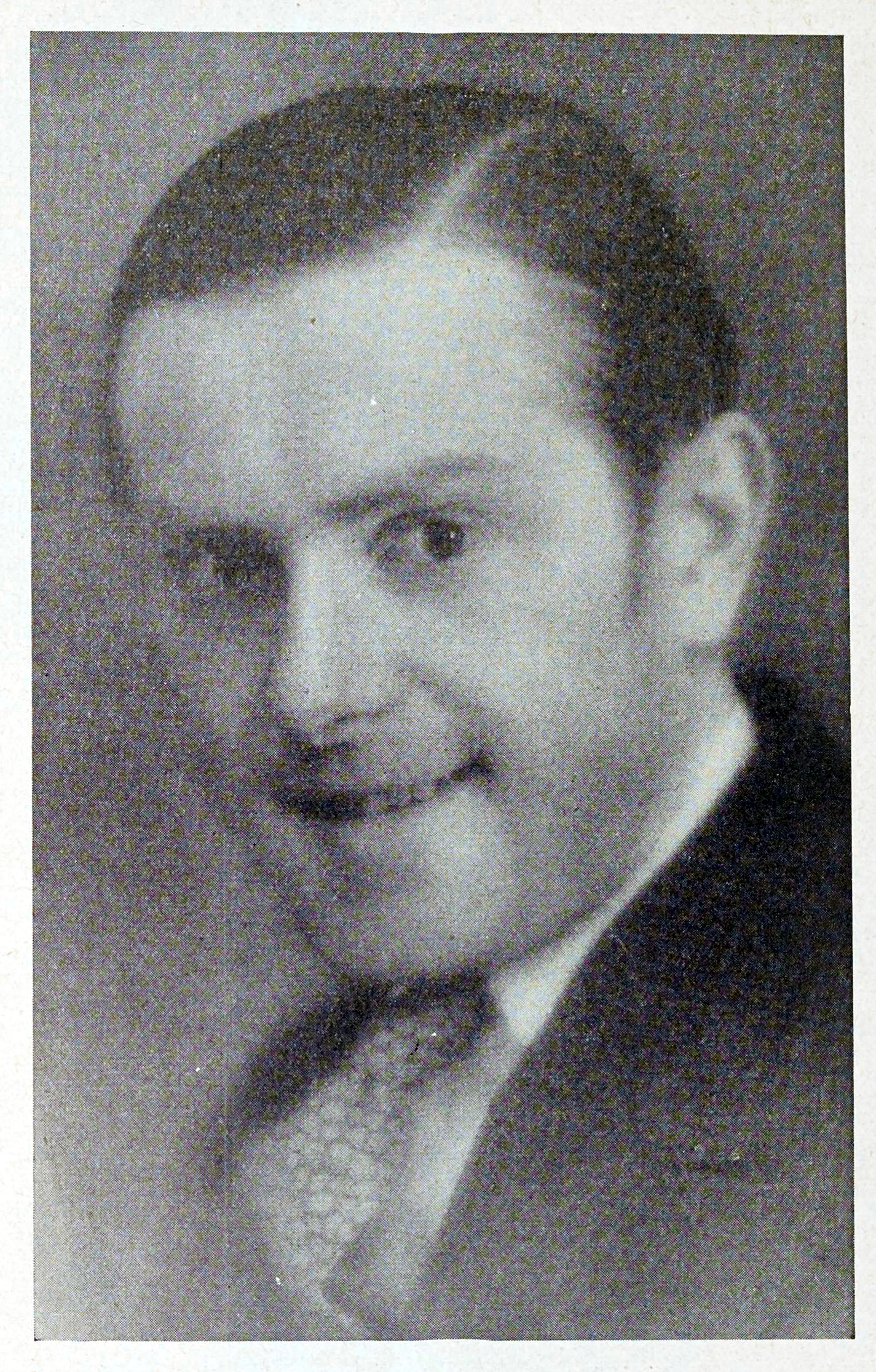
- Born: 12 May 1903; Hacquegnies, Belgium
- Died: 9 February 1998 (aged 94); Brie-Comte-Robert, France
- Occupation: Actor
- Years active: 1947–1990

Gabriel Gobin (12 May 1903 – 9 February 1998) was a Belgian film actor. He appeared in more than 100 films between 1947 and 1990. He was born in Hacquegnies, Belgium and died in Brie-Comte-Robert, France.

== Selected filmography ==
- Quai des Orfèvres (1947) – Le patron du bistrot
- Monsieur Vincent (1947) – Un serviteur de Monsieur Besnier (uncredited)
- Dédée d'Anvers (1948) – Paul
- Une si jolie petite plage (1949) – Arthur
- Monseigneur (1949) – Tatave
- Manèges (1950) – Émile
- Here Is the Beauty (1950) – Le machiniste
- The Paris Waltz (1950) – Chqbert – le régisseur
- Old Boys of Saint-Loup (1950) – Subileau – l'agriculteur
- Identité judiciaire (1951) – Un ouvrier (uncredited)
- The Lovers of Bras-Mort (1951) – Marinier
- Passion (1951)
- The Voyage to America (1951) – Employé du car
- Leathernose (1952) – Le piqueur
- The Seven Deadly Sins (1952) – Le gendarme (segment "Luxure, La / Lust") (uncredited)
- We Are All Murderers (1952) – Un gardien (uncredited)
- Desperate Decision (1952) – L'employé de la gare
- Crimson Curtain (1952)
- Run Away Mr. Perle (1952) – Un homme au bistrot de Romainville
- Follow That Man (1953) – L'agent Faurel (uncredited)
- The Secret of Helene Marimon (1954)
- The Lovers of Marianne (1954) – Le villageois qui fait du scandale (uncredited)
- Razzia sur la chnouf (1955) – Un client du "Troquet"
- Black Dossier (1955) – Le brigadier
- Girl on the Third Floor (1955) – Un locataire (uncredited)
- The Best Part (1955) – Un joueur de cartes
- People of No Importance (1956) – L'homme de la cabane
- Marie Antoinette Queen of France (1956) – (uncredited)
- Meeting in Paris (1956)
- The Width of the Pavement (1956) – L'ouvrier
- Pardonnez nos offenses (1956)
- Blood to the Head (1956) – Arthur Cardinaud
- Paris, Palace Hotel (1956) – Le brigadier
- Que les hommes sont bêtes (1957)
- Le rouge est mis (1957) – L'inspecteur Bouvard
- Young Girls Beware (1957) – Le médecin
- Trois jours à vivre (1957)
- Comme un cheveu sur la soupe (1957) – Le terrassier devant chez Pierre (uncredited)
- Sinners of Paris (1958) – Le gardien du garage (uncredited)
- Police judiciaire (1958) – Le chauffeur de René le Belge (uncredited)
- Le désordre et la nuit (1958) – L'inspecteur Rocard
- Rapt au deuxième bureau (1958) – Lieutenant Fernand, 2ème Bureau
- Madame et son auto (1958)
- Time Bomb (1959) – Julien Aubriant
- The Big Chief (1959) – Le chauffeur de taxi (uncredited)
- Archimède le clochard (1959) – Le Breton (uncredited)
- La bête à l'affût (1959) – L'hôtelier
- Soupe au lait (1959)
- Rue des prairies (1959) – Dubourg
- Signé Arsène Lupin (1959) – L'employé de la SNCF (uncredited)
- La nuit des traqués (1959)
- The Cat Shows Her Claws (1960) – Le conducteur de la locomotive
- The Baron of the Locks (1960) – Valentin
- Les Bonnes Femmes (1960) – Le père d'Henri
- The Old Guard (1960) – Étienne Lesage, employé de la mairie
- It Happened All Night (1960) – Sergeant
- Boulevard (1960)
- The President (1961) – Un gendarme en faction
- The Passion of Slow Fire (1961) – Le sergent de police Ruchet
- Le cave se rebiffe (1961) – L'entraîneur hippique à Vincennes
- A Monkey in Winter (1962) – Un habitué du café
- Trique, gamin de Paris (1962)
- The Mysteries of Paris (1962) – M. Morel, le tailleur
- Five Miles to Midnight (1962)
- Two Are Guilty (1963) – Albert, le concierge du Palais
- Any Number Can Win (1963) – Un voyageur du train (uncredited)
- The Day and the Hour (1963) – L'employé du chemin de fer
- Diary of a Chambermaid (1964) – Le brigadier qui vient arrêter Joseph
- Up from the Beach (1965) – Trombonist
- The Dirty Game (1965) – O'Hara
- How to Keep the Red Lamp Burning (1965) – Maître Leproux (segment "Les bons vivants")
- Le caïd de Champignol (1966) – Larivière
- Mademoiselle (1966) – Police Sergeant
- La Grande Vadrouille (1966) – Le machiniste résistant de l'opéra
- The Thief of Paris (1967) – Le père Visin
- The Oldest Profession (1967) – Un monsieur choqué (segment "Aujourd'hui") (uncredited)
- Les risques du métier (1967) – Le juge d'instruction
- The Milky Way (1969) – Father
- Les gros malins (1969) – Le président des courses
- La Horse (1970) – Le brigadier
- La nuit bulgare (1970)
- Le petit matin (1971) – Un marin
- Ben et Bénédict (1977) – Le vieux voisin
- Inspector Blunder (1980) – L'avocat du satyre
- Diva (1981)
- Tandem (1987) – Old barman
- L'invité surprise (1989) – Le vieil homme
