= Jean Aurenche =

French screenwriter

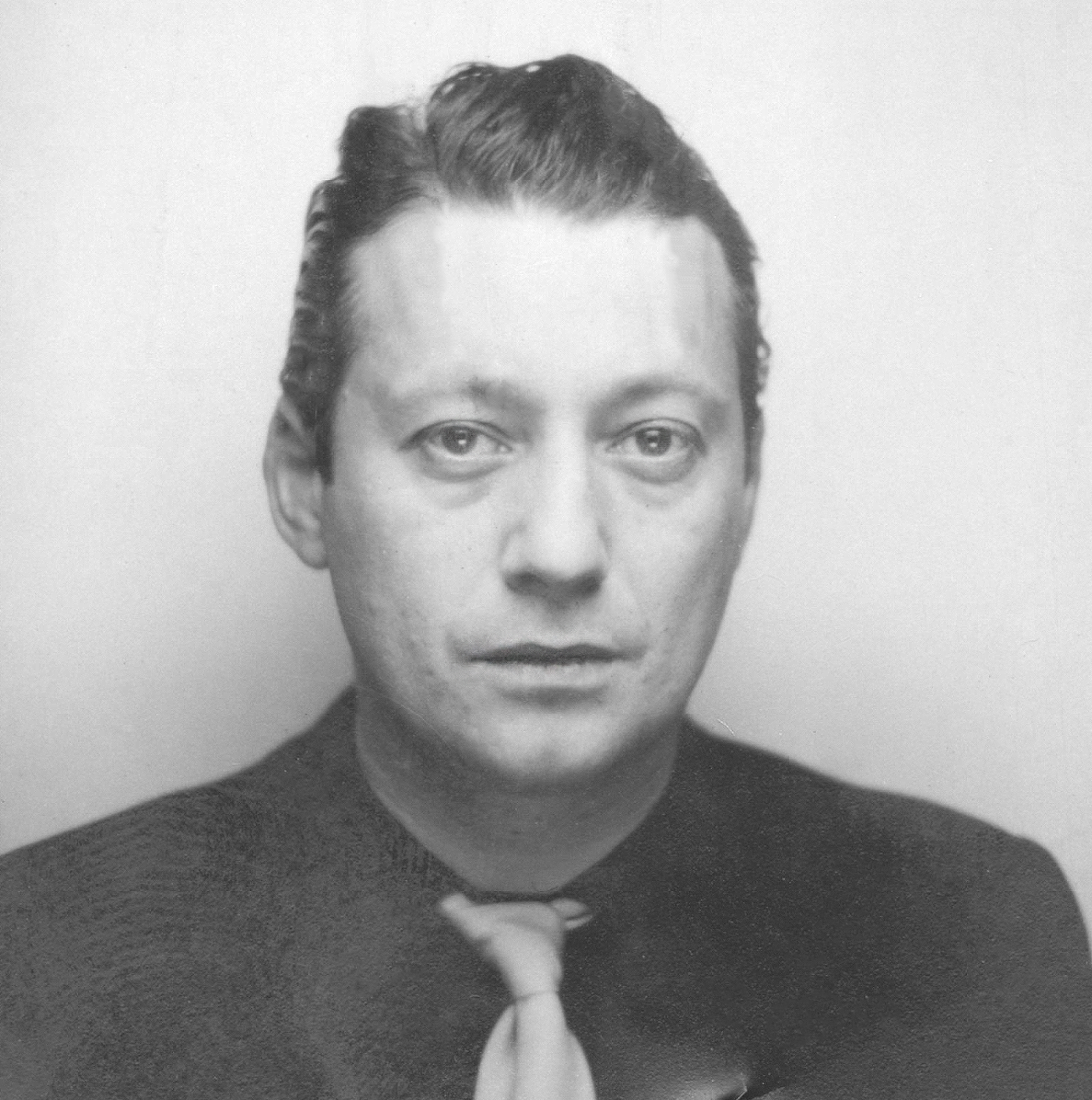
- Jean Aurenche in 1938
- Born: Jean-Marie Louis Charles Philippe Aurenche; 11 September 1904 Pierrelatte, Drôme, France
- Died: 29 September 1992 (aged 88) Bandol, Var, France
- Occupation: Screenwriter

Jean Aurenche (11 September 1904 – 29 September 1992) was a French screenwriter. During his career, he wrote 80 films for directors such as René Clément, Bertrand Tavernier, Marcel Carné, Jean Delannoy and Claude Autant-Lara. He is often associated with the screenwriter Pierre Bost, with whom he had a fertile partnership from 1940 to 1975.

== The early years ==
In the 1920s and 1930s, Jean Aurenche was friends with some members of the surrealist groups. His sister Marie-Berthe was the wife of Max Ernst and Max Ernst soon became friend with Jean Aurenche. Later, he even appeared in some film commercials directed by Jean Aurenche (for the "Nicolas" Wine, the "Barbes" stores and so on...). Jean Aurenche was also a close friend of Jean Cocteau who helped him publish several of his short stories in the famous "NRF".

In 1933, Jean Aurenche co-directed two short documentaries with Pierre Charbonnier: Pirates du Rhône and Bracos de Sologne. He later co-wrote the short film Monsieur Cordon with director Pierre Prévert. He soon turned to screenwriting, writing or co-writing several films like L'affaire du Courrier de Lyon (1936) by Maurice Lehmann and Claude Autant-Lara, L'affaire Lafarge or, more famously, Hôtel du Nord that he co-wrote with Marcel Carné and Henri Jeanson.

== Aurenchébost ==
In 1942, starting with Douce (directed by Autant-Lara), Aurenche formed a longstanding partnership with Pierre Bost. Their method of writing together initially worked as such : Jean Aurenche wrote the treatment of the screenplay (sometimes based on a novel) and Pierre Bost then expanded this outline and wrote the dialogue. But soon, both of them wrote all the script together without any clear division of the writing. Together, Aurenche & Bost wrote several great successes of this time period, often associated with director Claude Autant-Lara : le Diable au corps (1945), l'Auberge rouge (1951), le Rouge et le Noir (1954), la Traversée de Paris (1956). Meanwhile, Aurenche & Bost started a fertile collaboration with Jean Delannoy, writing for him La Symphonie Pastorale (1947) which won the Palme d'Or at the Cannes Festival of 1947. During this time, they also worked with René Clément (Au-delà des grilles, Jeux interdits and Gervaise). The film Jeux Interdits won the Academy Award on the Best Foreign Film in 1952 and soon became a classic. All these critic and commercial triumph contributed to make of Aurenche one of the most revered screenwriters of his time.

== The later years ==
In 1954, future filmmaker François Truffaut wrote an article in Les Cahiers du Cinéma harshly criticizing the work of Jean Aurenche & Pierre Bost. The writing team progressively went out of fashion and barely worked during the 1960s as their favorite collaborators (Autant-Lara, Clément, Delannoy) grew older and retired. In 1970, young filmmaker Bertrand Tavernier (who was a fan of their work), asked them to write with him an adaptation of L'Horloger d'Everton (a Georges Simenon novel) for his first feature film. The film, titled L'Horloger de Saint Paul was a great success, both public and critical. Aurenche and Tavernier quickly became close collaborators, even after Pierre Bost's death in 1975. They went on to write three more films together and even co-directed a documentary about surrealist writer Philippe Soupaul. In 1975, Jean Aurenche and Bertrand Tavernier reworked an outline written in 1951 by Aurenche & Bost. This became the film le Juge et l'Assassin which garnered great reviews when it was released in 1976.

During the 80s, Jean Aurenche kept on working with several directors like Robert Enrico (De Guerre Lasse), Bertrand Tavernier (Coup de Torchon, based on the Jim Thompson novel "Pop. 1280" and L'Étoile du Nord de Pierre Granier-Deferre. He died in 1992 in Bandol. He was 89.

== Hommages ==
Soon after his death, a compilation of interviews with Jean Aurenche was published. Named La Suite à l'écran (To be continued on the screen), this book co-written by French journalist Alain Riou contained insights and information about most of Jean Aurenche's screenplays and collaborators. Later, almost ten years after his death, Bertrand Tavernier co-wrote and directed a film about the lives of Jean Aurenche and Jean Devaivre (a French assistant director) during World War II. The film, named Laissez Passer starred Jacques Gamblin (as Jean Devaivre) and Denis Podalydès (as Jean Aurenche).

In 2010, French cinema channel Cine Cinema broadcast a 52 minutes documentary about the life and work of Jean Aurenche, which is also available as a DVD. Titled Jean Aurenche, écrivain de cinéma, this film was directed by Alexandre Hilaire and Yacine Badday. It features some of Jean Aurenche's collaborators including Jean-Pierre Mocky, Alain Riou and Bertrand Tavernier. It also features Jean Aurenche himself by means of footage of a 1970 interview.

== Filmography ==
- 1933 : Monsieur Cordon, directed by Pierre Prévert
- 1937 : Les Dégourdis de la 11e, directed by Christian-Jaque
- 1937 : Vous n'avez rien à déclarer ?, directed by Léo Joannon
- 1937 : The Courier of Lyon, directed by Maurice Lehmann and Claude Autant-Lara
- 1938 : The Lafarge Case, directed by Pierre Chenal : histoire
- 1938 : The Gutter, directed by Maurice Lehmann : adaptation
- 1938 : Hôtel du Nord, directed by Marcel Carné : adaptation
- 1939 : Midnight Tradition
- 1940 : Love Cavalcade
- 1940 : The Emigrant, directed by Léo Joannon : histoire
- 1940 : The Mondesir Heir, directed by Albert Valentin : histoire
- 1941 : Madame Sans-Gêne, directed by Roger Richebé : adaptation
- 1942 : Le Moussaillon:
- 1942 : Romance for Three, directed by Roger Richebé : adaptation
- 1942 : Chiffon's Wedding, directed by Claude Autant-Lara : adaptation
- 1942 : No Love Allowed
- 1942 : Eight Men in a Castle : adaptation
- 1942 : Love Letters
- 1943 : L'Épouvantail : histoire
- 1943 : Domino, directed by Roger Richebé
- 1943 : Love Story, directed by Claude Autant-Lara
- 1943 : Adrien, directed by Fernandel
- 1944 : Le Voleur de paratonnerres: sur une idée de
- 1944 : Traveling Light, directed by Jean Anouilh
- 1944 : Les Petites du quai aux fleurs, directed by Marc Allégret : scénario
- 1946 : Sylvie and the Ghost, directed by Claude Autant-Lara
- 1946 : Les J3: adaptation
- 1946 : Pastoral Symphony, directed by Jean Delannoy
- 1947 : The Seventh Door, directed by André Zwoboda
- 1947 : Devil in the Flesh, directed by Claude Autant-Lara
- 1947 : The Lovers of Pont Saint Jean, directed by Henri Decoin
- 1949 : The Walls of Malapaga, directed by René Clément
- 1949 : Keep an Eye on Amelia, directed by Claude Autant-Lara
- 1950 : God Needs Men, directed by Jean Delannoy
- 1951 : Gigolo, directed by Roger Richebé : scénario
- 1951 : The Red Inn, directed by Claude Autant-Lara: scénario, adaptation and dialogues
- 1952 : The Seven Deadly Sins : segments La Luxure de Yves Allégret, L'Orgueil de Claude Autant-Lara et Huitième pêché de Georges Lacombe : scénario
- 1952 : Forbidden Games, directed by René Clément : scénario, dialogue
- 1953 : The Proud and the Beautiful, directed by Yves Allégret
- 1954 : Le Blé en herbe, directed by Claude Autant-Lara
- 1954 : Daughters of Destiny (segment Jeanne), directed by Jean Delannoy
- 1954 : Mam'zelle Nitouche, directed by Yves Allégret
- 1954 : The Red and the Black, directed by Claude Autant-Lara
- 1955 : The Little Rebels, directed by Jean Delannoy : histoire et scénario
- 1956 : Gervaise, directed by René Clément
- 1956 : La Traversée de Paris, directed by Claude Autant-Lara : dialogue et scénario
- 1956 : The Hunchback of Notre Dame, directed by Jean Delannoy
- 1958 : In Case of Adversity, directed by Claude Autant-Lara : scénario
- 1958 : The Gambler, directed by Claude Autant-Lara
- 1959 : The Female, directed by Julien Duvivier
- 1959 : Way of Youth, directed by Michel Boisrond
- 1959 : The Green Mare, directed by Claude Autant-Lara
- 1961 : Tu ne tueras point, directed by Claude Autant-Lara
- 1961 : Rendezvous, directed by Jean Delannoy
- 1964 : Les amitiés particulières, directed by Jean Delannoy
- 1965 : A Woman in White : adaptation
- 1966 : Is Paris Burning?, directed by René Clément
- 1967 : The Oldest Profession - one segment - directed by Claude Autant-Lara and Philippe de Broca
- 1969 : Les Patates, directed by Claude Autant-Lara : scenario
- 1974 : The Clockmaker, directed by Bertrand Tavernier : scénario
- 1975 : Let Joy Reign Supreme, directed by Bertrand Tavernier : scénario
- 1976 : The Judge and the Assassin, directed by Bertrand Tavernier
- 1980 : The Lady of the Camellias, directed by Mauro Bolognini : histoire
- 1981 : Coup de Torchon, directed by Bertrand Tavernier : scénario
- 1982 : L'Étoile du Nord, directed by Pierre Granier-Deferre : an adaption of Georges Simenon's novel La Locataire
- 1987 : Fucking Fernand, directed by Gérard Mordillat
- 1987 : De guerre lasse, directed by Robert Enrico
- 1989 : La Passion de Bernadette, directed by Jean Delannoy
