= Gérard Philipe =

French actor (1922–1959)

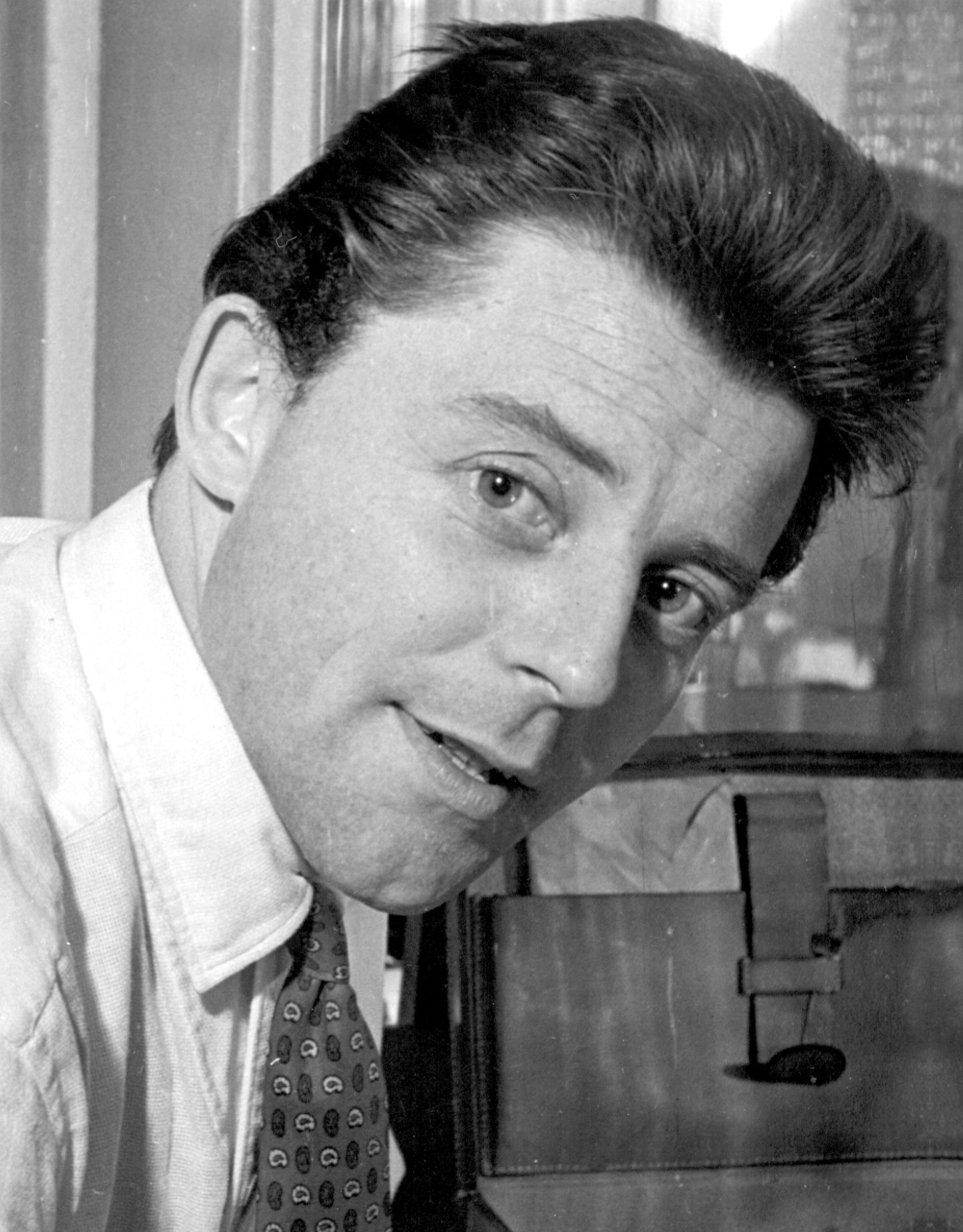
- Philipe in 1955
- Born: Gérard Albert Philip; 4 December 1922; Cannes, France
- Died: 25 November 1959 (aged 36); Paris, France
- Other name: Le Prince D'Avignon
- Education: Conservatoire of Dramatic Arts
- Occupations: Actor; director
- Years active: 1944–1959
- Spouse: Nicole Fourcade (m. 1951)
- Children: 2

Gérard Philipe (French pronunciation: [ʒeʁaʁ filip]; born Gérard Albert Philip; 4 December 1922 – 25 November 1959) was a prominent French actor who appeared in 32 films between 1944 and 1959 known for his outspoken communist views. He came to prominence during the later period of the poetic realism movement of French Cinema in the late 1940s. His best known credits include Such a Pretty Little Beach (1949), Beauty and the Devil (1950), Fan Fan the Tulip (1953), Montparnasse 19 (1958) and Les liaisons dangereuses (1959).

During his career he performed with some of the most prominent ladies of the era including Jeanne Moreau, Michèle Morgan, Micheline Presle, Danielle Darrieux, Gina Lollobrigida, María Félix, and Anouk Aimée.

As well as a successful film career, he was also a highly regarded classical actor, later achieving further fame when he became a member of Jean Vilar's Théâtre national populaire where he performed in many of the greatest plays from the repertoire of French drama. He was, until his premature death, one of the main stars of the post-war period. His image has remained youthful and romantic, making him one of the most beloved cultural icons in French cinema.

== Early life ==
Gérard Albert Philip was born on 4 December 1922 in the villa Les Cynanthes in Cannes (Alpes-Maritimes), into an affluent family, made up of Marcel Philip (1893-1973) who was a wealthy barrister, businessman and owner of various hotel establishments on the Côte d'Azur and in Paris. His mother was Maria Elisa "Minou" Philip, née Vilette (1894–1970) and he had an older brother, Jean, who was one year his senior. His mother was the daughter of a pastry chef based in Chartres and a Czech emigrant who came directly from Prague. Making Philipe one-quarter Czech ancestry from his maternal grandmother. In 1936, his father became a member of the Nationalist League of the Croix-de-Feu, later becoming enthusiastic about Jacques Doriot and his dream of national-socialism à la française, joined the French People's Party and became secretary of the federation of Cannes.

In 1928, Gérard was, with his brother Jean, an intern at the Stanislas Institutei High School in Cannes run by the Marianists, where he was a good student. There, at the beginning of the war, he obtained his baccalaureate.

As a teenager, Philipe took acting lessons before going to Paris to study at the Conservatoire of Dramatic Art.

In 1940, the Philip family moved to Grasse where Marcel managed the Parc Palace Hotel, Grasse. As the owner-manager of the Parc palace-hôtel, his father housed the Mussolinian general staff there in 1940 and then the Nazi general staff in 1943. However, it was during this period in the early 40s, that many artists joined the free zone, with the Côte d'Azur becoming a hive of intense activity.

In 1941, Philipe began studying law in Nice, as it was expected he would become a lawyer like his father, but after confiding in his mother, he considered leaving this path to become an actor, a move which his father opposed. The same year, the filmmaker Marc Allégret met Maria, who occasionally practiced as a clairvoyance at her husband's hotel. Knowing that her son dreamt of being in the theatre, she persuaded the director to audition him. He therefore auditioned Gérard, asking him to perform a scene from Étienne, a play by Jacques Deval where a 17-year-old son sees his vocation as an actor thwarted by his father. He is impressed by "a kind of violence [...] that we felt ready to boil over at any moment". The filmmaker advised him to enroll in the Center des jeunes du cinema in Nice, then sent him to take drama classes with Jean Wall and Jean Huet in Cannes.

Philipe had already enrolled in the faculty of law in Nice in 1942, but after meeting many refugee artists on the Côte d'Azur, then in the free zone since 1940, he finally made the decision to become an actor, with his mother supporting him in this endeavour.

=== Early Training ===
Philipe auditioned in 1942 in front of Maurice Cloche for the adventure film 'Les Cadets de l'océan', but did not get a role. He also did an essay for Le Blé en herbe alongside Danièle Delorme, but the project was censored by the Vichy regime. He eventually made his theatre debut in Une grande fille tout simple, by André Roussin. The premiere of which took place on 11 July at the Cannes Casino. The play was a great success and toured in the south of France, as well as in Switzerland. His talent is already appreciated and recognized by his peers.

In order to satisfy his mother's superstition, he adds an 'e' to his surname, so his first name and surname now form 13 letters. He would use this name professionally for the rest of his life.

It was whilst attending the Conservatory of Dramatic Art in Paris that Philipe made his debut in Nice at the age of 19 on 11 October 1943 in Paris at the Théâtre Hébertot in a production by Georges Douking, where he played Angel in Jean Giradoux's 'Sodome et Gomorrhe' (1943) opposite Edwige Feuillère, this original production was a commercial success and ran for over two hundred performances. It was this performance that made him a star overnight. It was as a result of his success on the stage, that led to him receiving film offers, and within five years he would achieve international fame in the cinema.

In 1943, Philipe toured with the play Une Jeune Fille sais by André Haguet, which met with success in Paris. He confirmed his acting gifts. Marc Allégret first hired him for a silhouette in the film La Boîte aux rêves, directed by his brother Yves, then gave him a small role in Petites du quai aux fleurs. The Philip family moved to rue de Paradis, in the 10th arrondissement of Paris. Gérard acquires his financial independence and lived with Jacques Sigurd on the rue du Dragon, in Saint-Germain-des-Prés. His friend, who would write many screenplays and dialogues in the films in which Gérard would play, introduced him to modern literature and introduced him to Caligula by Albert Camus. He obtained his first success and fame at the age of twenty, in the role of the angel of Sodom and Gomorrah by Jean Giraudoux. The director of the theatre, Jacques Hébertot, testifies: “From the first rehearsals, we realised that we had nothing to teach this young actor. He was inhabited". Despite the success, Gérard Philipe enrolled at the National Conservatory of Dramatic Art, took lessons from Denis d'Inès and won the second prize for comedy the following year, having been admitted to compete despite being in first year. At the Conservatoire, in 1944 he met the future poet Georges Perros with whom he would remain linked all his life.

In February 1943, Philipe had a Cannes doctor draw up a certificate confirming that he had suffered from pleurisy three years earlier and that his condition remained fragile: "65kg for 1.83m", which allowed him to be reformed. Another certificate was made in June 1943. This pleurisy will cause health concerns for the young man later. If some of his friends joined the Resistance, it is not certain that Gérard Philipe knew it then: the displayed opinions of Mr. Philip must have made them quite suspicious. Gérard Philipe will not join the Resistance until the very last hour.

From 20 to 25 August 1944 he took part in the Liberation of Paris, notably from the Hôtel de Ville, Paris, in the company of thirty people under the orders of Roger Stéphane. From October he took lessons from Georges Le Roy “He taught me to stand up straight, with my knees outstretched, facing life, like a healthy man.

In 1945, his father, Marcel, was sentenced to death in absentia for his crimes of collaboration. This resulted in the confiscation of his property on 22 November 1945 for intelligence with the enemy and membership in an anti-national group. Using his son's contacts, he was able to flee to Spain where he became a French teacher in Barcelona. Gérard, Anne and their children would pay him frequent visits.

== Career and stardom ==
=== Film ===
Philipe made his film debut in Les Petites du quai aux fleurs (1943), directed by Marc Allégret, in an uncredited role.

He had a minor role in Box of Dreams (1945) then was third billed in Land Without Stars (1946) after Jani Holt and Pierre Brasseur; George Lacombe wrote and directed.

When he was 19 years old, he made his stage debut at a theatre in Nice; and the following year his strong performance in the Albert Camus play Caligula made his reputation.

Philipe had a lead role in The Idiot (1946), an adaptation of the novel by Fyodor Dostoevsky, co-starring Edwige Feuillère for director Georges Lampin. This was seen in other countries and established Philipe as a leading man. He was in Ouvert pour cause d'inventaire (1946), a short film that was an early work for Alain Resnais.

He was invited to work with the Théâtre national populaire (T.N.P.) in Paris and Avignon, whose festival, founded in 1947 by Jean Vilar, is France's oldest and most famous.

Philipe gained fame as a result of his performance in Claude Autant-Lara's Devil in the Flesh (1947), alongside Micheline Presle. It was a huge box office success.

He went on to star in La Chartreuse de Parme (1948) for director Christian-Jacque, which was even more popular than Devil in the Flesh. He followed it with Such a Pretty Little Beach (1949) for Yves Allégret; All Roads Lead to Rome (1949), a reunion with Presle, for Jean Boyer; and Beauty and the Devil (1950) for René Clair.

Philipe was one of several stars in Max Ophüls' version of La Ronde (1950). He followed it with another all-star film, Lost Souvenirs (1951) for Christian-Jacques.

In 1951, Philipe married Nicole Fourcade (1917–1990), an actress/writer, with whom he had two children. She adopted the pseudonym, Anne Philipe, and wrote about her husband in two books, the first called Souvenirs (1960) and a second biography titled Le Temps d'un soupir (No Longer Than a Sigh, 1963).

Philipe was in Juliette, or Key of Dreams (1951) with Suzanne Cloutier for Marcel Carné; The Seven Deadly Sins (1952), an all-star anthology film; and Fan Fan the Tulip (1953), a swashbuckling adventure with Gina Lollobrigida for Christian-Jacque which was very popular.

He was in Beauties of the Night (1952), again with Lollobrigida, and Martine Carol, directed by Clair; The Proud and the Beautiful (1953) with Michèle Morgan; two more all-star anthologies: It Happened in the Park (1953) and Royal Affairs in Versailles (1954).

Philipe tried an English movie, Lovers, Happy Lovers! (1954, also known as Knave of Hearts), directed by René Clément and co-starring Valerie Hobson.

He then did The Red and the Black (1954) with Danielle Darrieux and had a big success with The Grand Maneuver (1955) for René Clair, co-starring Morgan.

Philipe did The Best Part (1956) for Yves Allégret and was one of many stars in If Paris Were Told to Us (1956).

He wrote, directed and starred in Bold Adventure (1956), a comic adventure film.

He starred in Lovers of Paris (1957) for Julien Duvivier and Montparnasse 19 (1958) for Jacques Becker. He was one of many stars in Life Together (1958) and top billed in The Gambler (1958).

In 1958 he went to New York and performed on Broadway in the all-French Lorenzaccio and Le Cid.

Philipe played Valmont in Roger Vadim's modern day version of Les liaisons dangereuses (1959), appearing alongside Jeanne Moreau.

His last film was Fever Mounts at El Pao (1960) for Luis Buñuel.

=== Théâtre National Populaire (TNP) ===
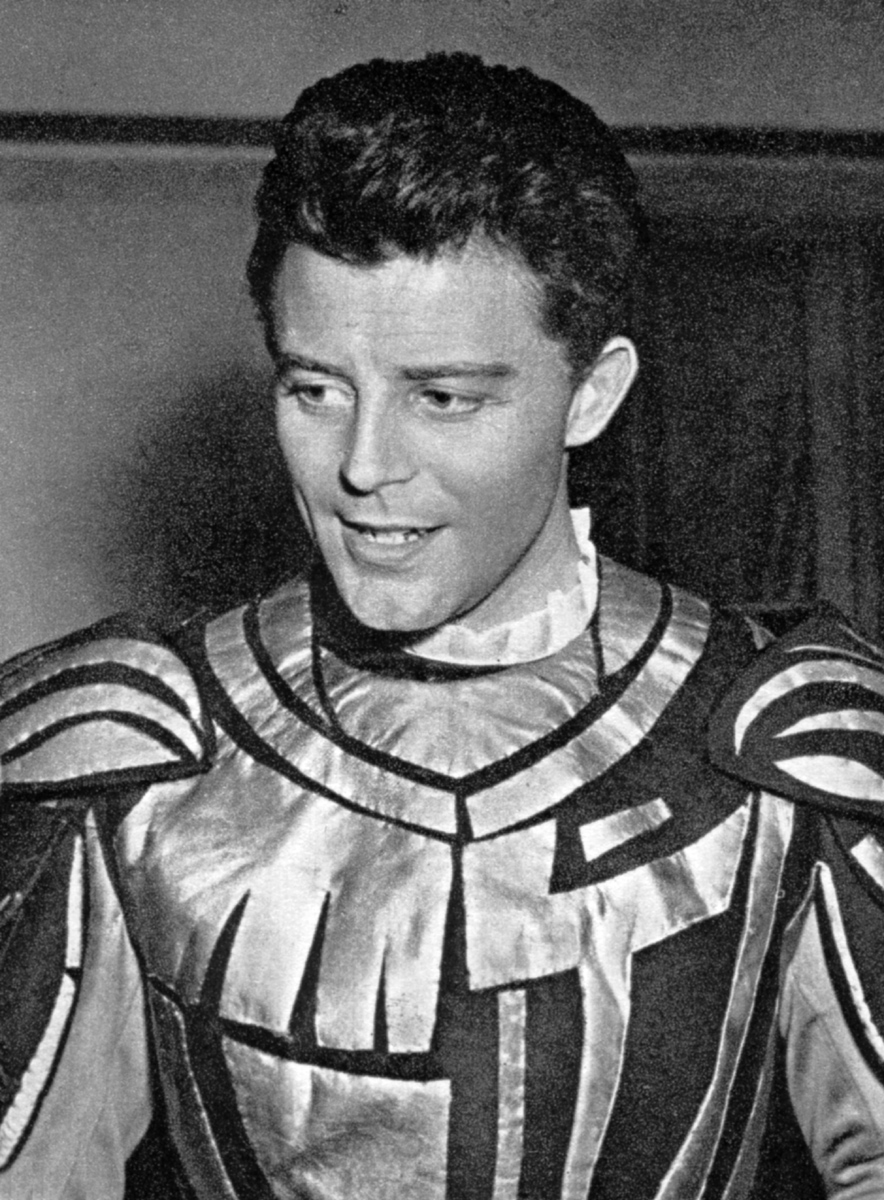
Gérard Philipe in 1954 in the costume of Don Rodrigue.

Finally, in November, Gérard Philipe came to find Jean Vilar in his box at the Théâtre de l'Atelier, after a performance of Henri IV by Luigi Pirandello. Vilar testifies: “While removing my make-up that evening, I looked out of the corner of my eye at this famous boy whom I did not know well. Tall, erect, with a rare gesture, a clear and frank gaze, his presence was made up of both calm strength and fragility. I told him that I was preparing the Festival d'Avignon 1951, that is to say the fifth Festival, and that it was the only undertaking I could assure him of. He replied immediately that he would therefore be from the next Avignon. Two days later, I gave him Le Prince de Hombourg . He says yes. I added: And The Cid? He lowered his head, smiled, then fell silent. Indeed , two years earlier, the actor had refused the role of Rodrigue, to the chagrin of the director.

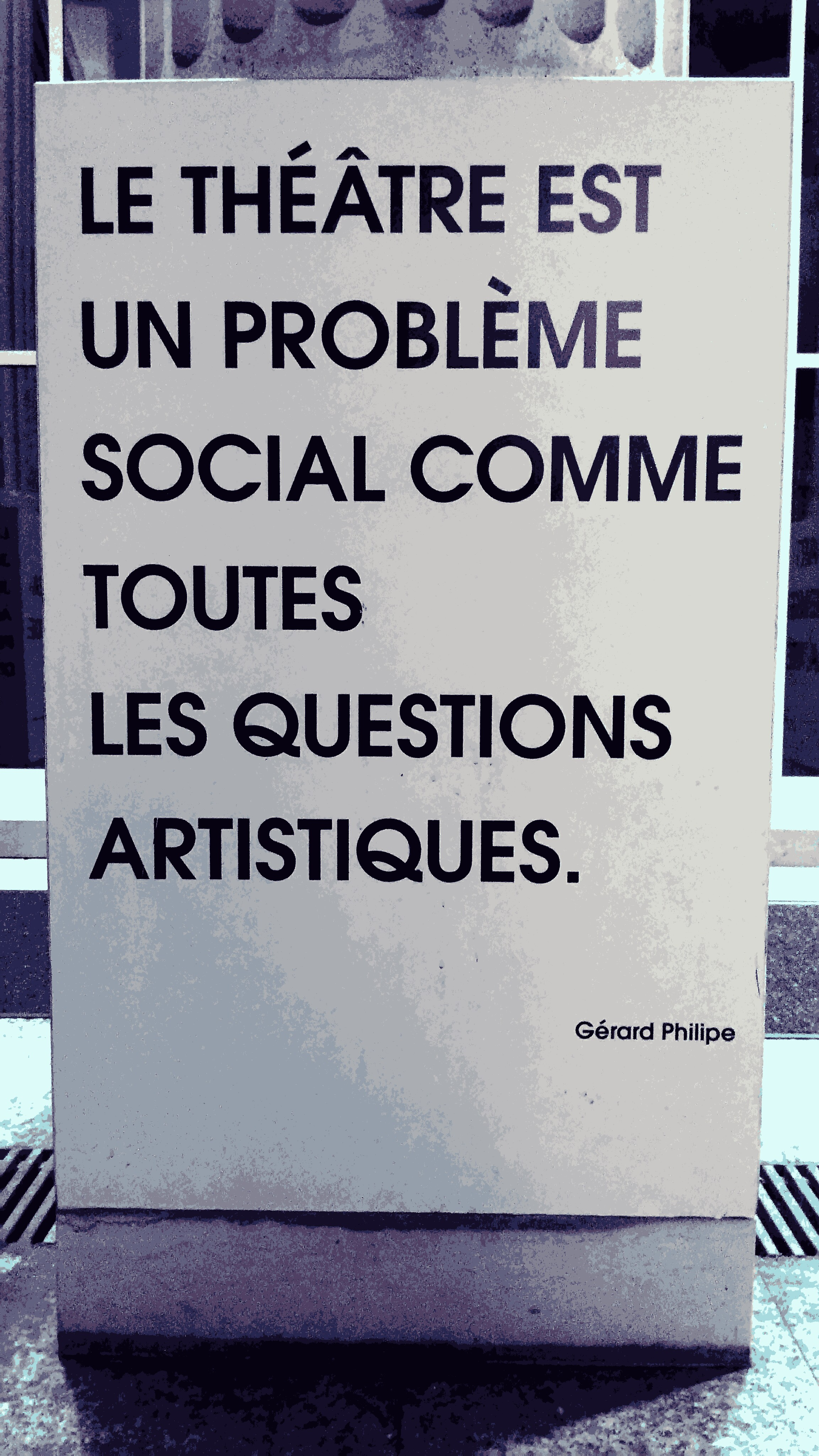
"Theatre is a social issue, like all artistic questions." (Quotation from Gérard Philipe on a pillar of the Théâtre des Abbesses, Paris.)

This meeting also marked Philipe: “A conversation with Vilar, his remarks on the theater, his opinion on the plays that I burned to play, left me won over. One of Vilar's great qualities is his patience. Me, I was playing impatient. But when he made me read The Prince of Hombourg , I no longer hesitated to follow him [...]" Léon Gischia, decorator and costume designer alongside Jean Vilar, was convinced that one of the major reasons that prompted Philipe to offer himself to work with Vilar, "are these new relationships, this new contact that Vilar had been able to create with his audience. - this young public, this popular public which was to become that of the TNP and for which Gérard already felt and has never ceased to feel such a deep need”.

Adventure of the TNP The following year, Jean Vilar was appointed director of the Théâtre national populaire (TNP) and led a troupe made up of young actors and actresses with promising careers such as Philippe Noiret, Jeanne Moreau, Charles Denner and Daniel Sorano. Philipe declared: “for me, the TNP is my home, it's my house”. Rehearsals for Le Cid and Le Prince de Hombourg began on 30 May, and after a difficult start Philipe managed to appropriate the role of Rodrigue thanks to Jean Vilar:“Everything seems possible to me since Vilar, to my great surprise, asked me to interpret the Cid. He won, not me.

The premiere of Prince de Hombourg took place on 15 July at the Festival d'Avignon, in the main courtyard of the Palais des Papes On the 17th, Philipe was injured during the last dress rehearsal by falling 2.50 meters, fortunately cushioned by his thick suit 18 . If he is forced to play motionless or seated throughout the festival, considerably weakening his playing, the piece is nonetheless a triumph. This experience reinforces his attachment to the troupe and to Jean Vilar's project to make theater accessible to all. Léon Gischia believes that “Avignon will have been for Gérard a marriage of love with his public; this audience that Jean had prepared for him and who was only waiting for him.

On 29 September Gérard Philipe signed his one-year contract with the TNP, tacitly renewable. Despite his career and his international fame, he reassured the new director that he is ready to receive a lower fee at the cinema so as not to jeopardise the troupe's budget. His salary is set at 30,000 francs gross per month (€ 750 in 2019), to which are added 400 francs per rehearsal (€10 in 2019). Jean Vilar later went on to say that in eight years, Philipe did not ask for any increase in salary, preferential treatment or special clauses. Also, to make the company truly democratic, his name appeared in its alphabetical place on all the posters.

Philippe Noiret told biographer (and husband of Philipe's daughter, Anne), Jérôme Garcin that it was customary, even when his fellow actors were acting in the same play, to "stop at the gallery to admire Philipe's acting, fascinated by his way of possessing the stage".

He was joint president of the French actors’ union, Federation Internationale des Acteurs, (along with Jean Darcante) at the time of his death.

== Death ==
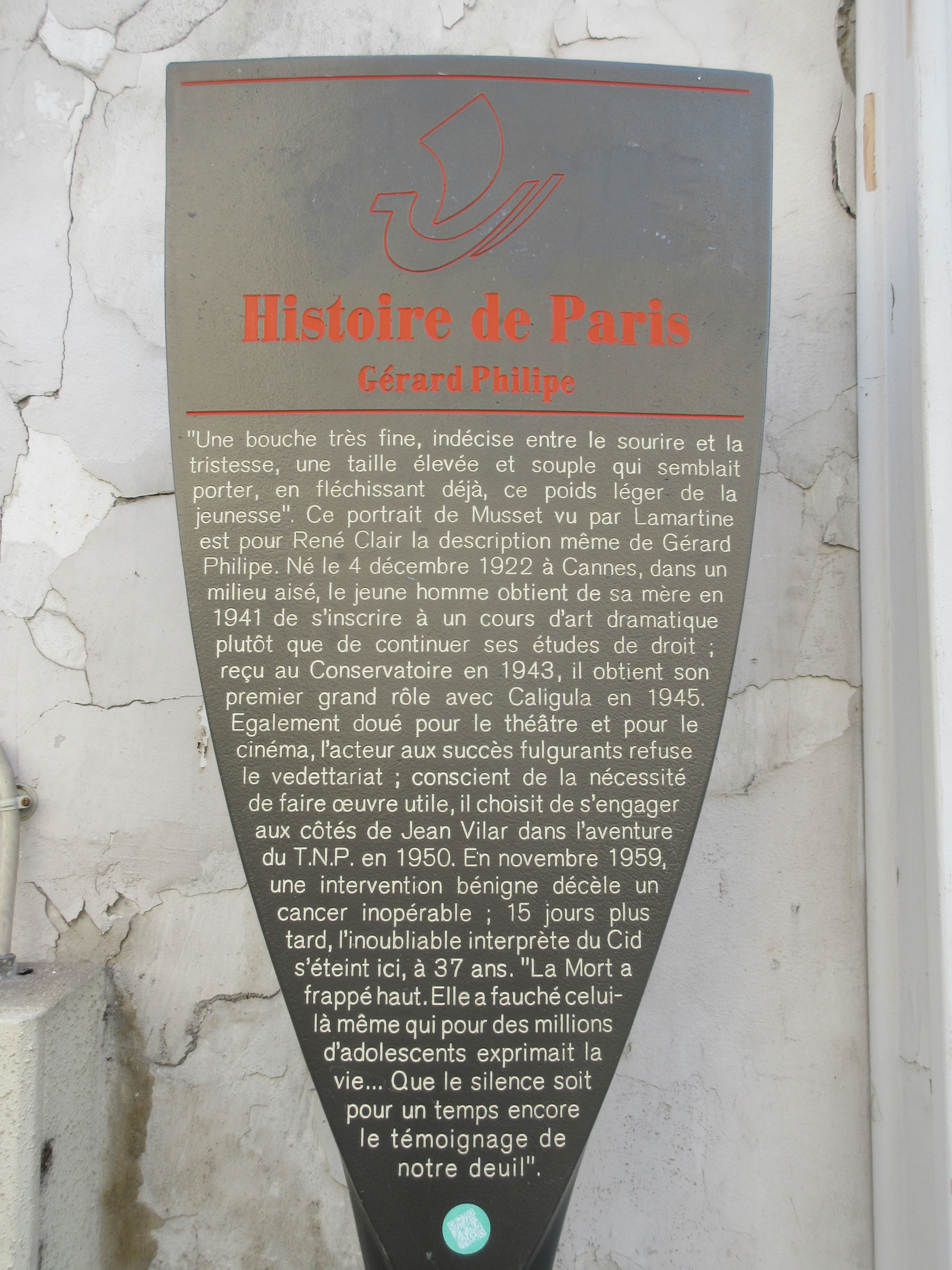
Plaque outside 17 rue de Tournon.

On 5 November 1959 he was admitted to hospital at the Violet Clinic, 60 rue Violet (Paris 15th), where he was diagnosed with liver cancer. His wife and the doctors concealed the nature of his disease, letting him believe that the operation was a successful operation against an abscess, to spare him dealing with the tragic news. He was working on ideas for plays and films he planned to work on for when he got better, one of which was Hamlet. He died from liver cancer, on 25 November 1959, at his home on the Rue de Tournon, Paris, eight days short of his 37th birthday.

His untimely death caused a deep outpouring of shock and emotion in France, due to his great popularity as an actor and French icon. Jean Vilar paid him a final tribute on 28 November, on the stage of the Théâtre national de Chaillot: "Death struck high. She mowed down the very one that (…) for us expressed life. (…) Hard worker, secret worker, methodical worker, he nevertheless mistrusted his gifts which were those of grace".

In accordance with his last wishes, he was buried, dressed in the costume of Don Rodrigue (The Cid), in the village cemetery in Ramatuelle, Var, near the Mediterranean coast.

To commemorate the centenary of the cinema in 1995, the French government issued a series of limited edition coins that included a 100 franc coin bearing the image of Philipe. Among the most popular French actors of modern times, he has been elevated to mythic status in his homeland, not least because of his early death at the peak of his popularity.

== Personal life ==
It was in 1942, that Gérard first met Nicole Navaux, who was an ethologist and wife of diplomat François Fourcade. It was in 1946, after Nicole divorced her first husband, that she and Philipe became engaged, marrying on 29 November 1951 at the town hall of Neuilly-sur-Seine. Upon marriage Gérard asked his wife if she could use her first name, Anne, which he found to be more poetic. They soon had two children: Anne-Marie Philipe (born 21 December 1954) and Olivier Philipe (born 10 February 1956). They spent their time as a family between the boulevard d'Inkermann in Neuilly, and later rue de Tournon in Paris. They spent summer holidays together in Ramatuelle, in Provence, in a property belonging to Anne's family. In 1954, they bought a property in Cergy, on the banks of the Oise. Here they found a haven of peace, away from hectic Parisian life, a place to receive their friends including Georges Perros, Agnès Varda, Claude Roy, René Clair).

Philipe was a supporter of the Communist Party. He criticized however the Soviet intervention in Hungary in 1956. In 1959 he visited the communist leader of Cuba, Fidel Castro, on his invitation.

== Honours ==
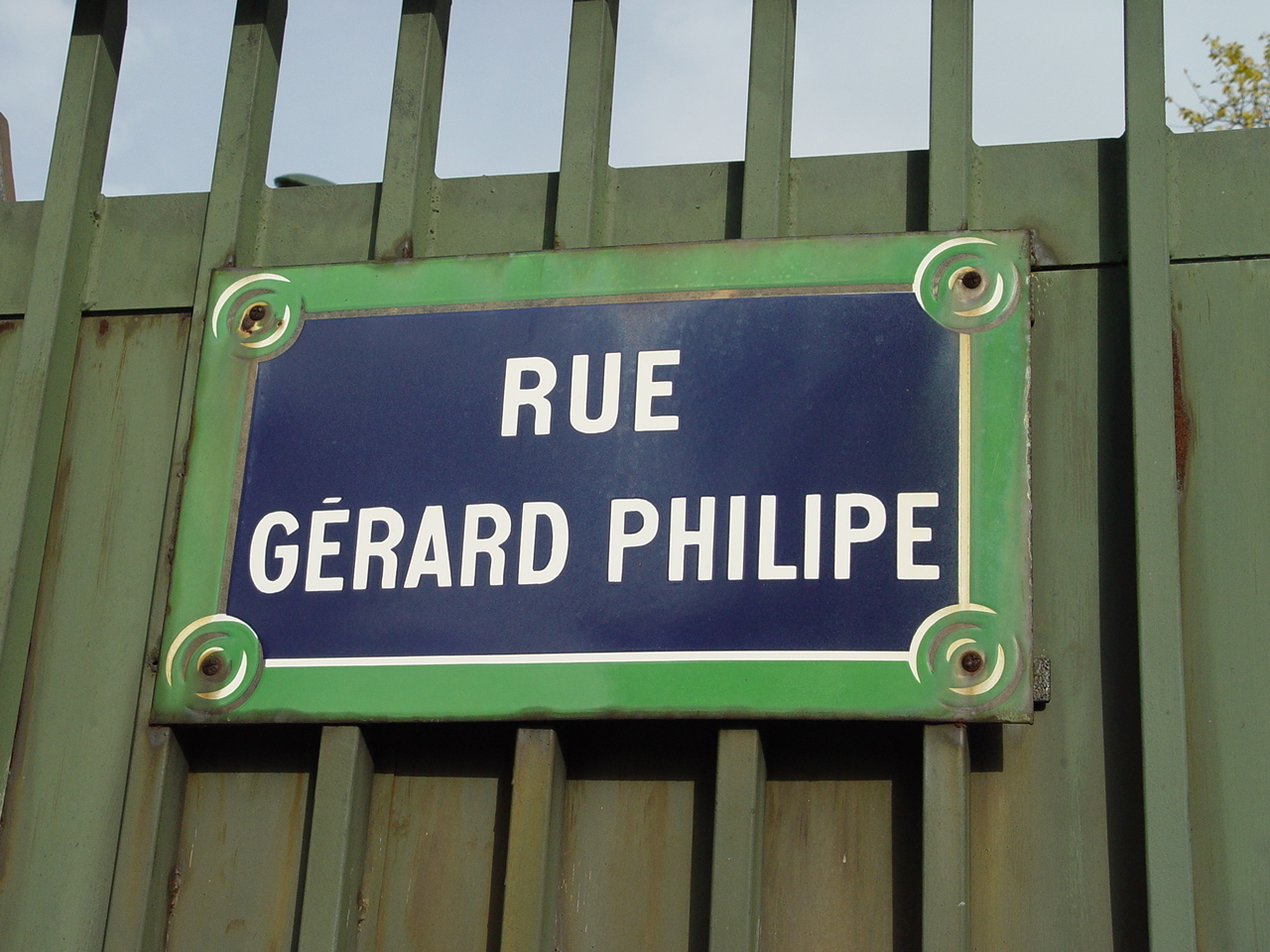
Gérard Philipe Street in Paris

"Rue Gérard Philipe" is a street in the 16th arrondissement of Paris named in his honour.

In 1961, his portrait appeared on a French commemorative postage stamp.

The "Gérard Philipe Theatre" (TGP) in Paris was named after him. From 1962 to 2000, the "Grand Prix Gérard Philipe de la Ville de Paris" was awarded almost annually by the city of Paris for the best actress or best actor at a Parisian theatre. Prize winners included Gérard Depardieu, Daniel Auteuil, Maria de Medeiros and Isabelle Carré.

There is also a film festival named in his honour as well as a number of theatres and schools (such as the College Gérard Philipe – Cogolin) in various parts of France. A cultural centre is named after him in Berlin.

== Filmography ==
=== Acting ===
Year	Title	Role	Director	Notes
1944	Les Petites du quai aux fleurs	Jérôme Hardy	Marc Allégret	
1945	Box of Dreams	Un homme	Yves Allégret and Jean Choux	Uncredited
1946	Land Without Stars	Simon Legouge / Frédéric Talacayud	Georges Lacombe	
1946	The Idiot	Le prince Muichkine	Georges Lampin	
1946	Ouvert pour cause d'inventaire		Alain Resnais	
1947	Devil in the Flesh	François Jaubert	Claude Autant-Lara	
1948	The Charterhouse of Parma	Fabrice del Dongo	Christian Jaque	
1949	Such a Pretty Little Beach	Pierre Monet	Yves Allégret	
1949	All Roads Lead to Rome	Gabriel Pégase	Jean Boyer	
1950	Beauty and the Devil	Young Henri Faust	René Clair	
1950	La Ronde	the Count	Max Ophüls	
1950	Lost Souvenirs	Gérard de Narçay	Christian-Jacque	(segment "Une cravate de fourrure")
1951	Juliette, or Key of Dreams	Michel Grandier	Marcel Carné	
1951	Saint-Louis, ange de la paix	Narrator	Robert Darène	Voice
1952	The Seven Deadly Sins	the carnival banker / the painter	Georges Lacombe	(segment "Huitième péché, Le / Eighth Sin, The")
1952	Fanfan la Tulipe	Fanfan La Tulipe	Christian-Jaque	
1952	Beauties of the Night	Claude	René Clair	
1953	The Proud and the Beautiful	Georges	Yves Allégret	
1953	It Happened in the Park	Carlo	Gianni Franciolini	(segment: Gli amanti)
1954	Royal Affairs in Versailles	D'Artagnan	Sacha Guitry	
1954	Knave of Hearts	Andre Ripois	René Clément	
1954	Le Rouge et le Noir	Julien Sorel	Claude Autant-Lara	
1955	The Grand Maneuver	Le lieutenant Armand de la Verne	René Clair	
1955	The Best Part	Philippe Perrin – l'ingénieur en chef	Yves Allégret	
1956	If Paris Were Told to Us	Le Trouvère	Sacha Guitry	
1956	Les Aventures de Till L'Espiègle	Till Eulenspiegel	Gérard Philipe and Joris Ivens	
1956	Sur les rivages de l'ambre	Narrator (French version) / Récitant	Jerzy Kalina	Voice
1957	The House of Lovers	Octave Mouret	Julien Duvivier	
1958	The Lovers of Montparnasse	Amedeo Modigliani	Jacques Becker	
1958	Life Together	Désiré	Clément Duhour	
1958	Le Joueur	Alexei Ivanovich	Claude Autant-Lara	
1959	Les Liaisons dangereuses	Vicomte de Valmont	Roger Vadim	
1959	La Fièvre Monte à El Pao	Ramon Vasquez	Luis Buñuel	

=== Voice ===
- Le Petit Prince (1954)
- La Vie de W.-A. Mozart – racontée aux enfants (1954)
- The texts of Karl Marx (1955)
- Pierre et le Loup (Peter and the Wolf by Sergei Prokofiev) with the Symphony Orchestra of the USSR (1956)
