= Allégret =

Allégret is a surname. Notable people with the surname include:

- Catherine Allégret (born 1946), French actress
- Élie Allégret (1865–1940), French Protestant pastor, father of Marc and Yves Allégret
- Émile Allegret (1907–1990), French soldier and member of the Resistance during World War II
- Marc Allégret (1900–1973), French screenwriter and film director
- Yves Allégret (1905–1987), French film director
