= Leather-Nose =

1936 novel by Jean de La Varende

- Author: Jean de La Varende
- Original title: Nez-de-Cuir
- Translator: R. Wills Thomas
- Language: French
- Publisher: Éditions Maugard
- Publication date: 5 November 1936
- Publication place: France
- English publication date: 1938
- Pages: 266

Leather-Nose (French: Nez-de-Cuir) is a 1936 novel by the French writer Jean de La Varende, about Achille Perrier de La Genevraye, an officer during the Napoleonic Wars and the author's grand uncle. An English translation by R. Wills Thomas was published in 1938.

The book was the basis for the 1952 film Leathernose, directed by Yves Allégret and starring Jean Marais. François Truffaut prepared a film adaptation in 1984, but was too weak by sickness and died before it could be made.
