= Jean de La Varende =

French writer (1887–1959)

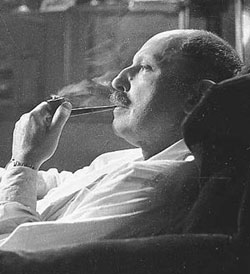
- Jean de La Varende
- Born: 24 May 1887; Château de Bonneville, Chamblac, Eure, France
- Died: 8 June 1959 (aged 72)
- Occupations: Writer, novelist
- Writing career
- Notable works: Centaur of God, Leather-Nose
- Notable awards: Grand Prix du roman de l'Académie française (1938)

Jean de La Varende (24 May 1887 at the Château de Bonneville in Chamblac, Eure – 8 June 1959) was a French writer. He wrote novels, short stories, biographies and monographs, in particular on the subject of Normandy. He initially tried to become a naval officer like his father, but gave up because of his weak heart. He was elected into the Académie Goncourt in 1942.

He received the 1938 Grand Prix du roman de l'Académie française for Centaur of God. His 1936 novel Leather-Nose was the basis for the 1952 film Leathernose, directed by Yves Allégret.
