= Théâtre Hébertot =

Theatre in Paris, France

Coordinates: 48°52′55.5″N 2°19′8″E

- Théâtre des Batignolles (1838–1907); Théâtre des Arts (1907–1940)
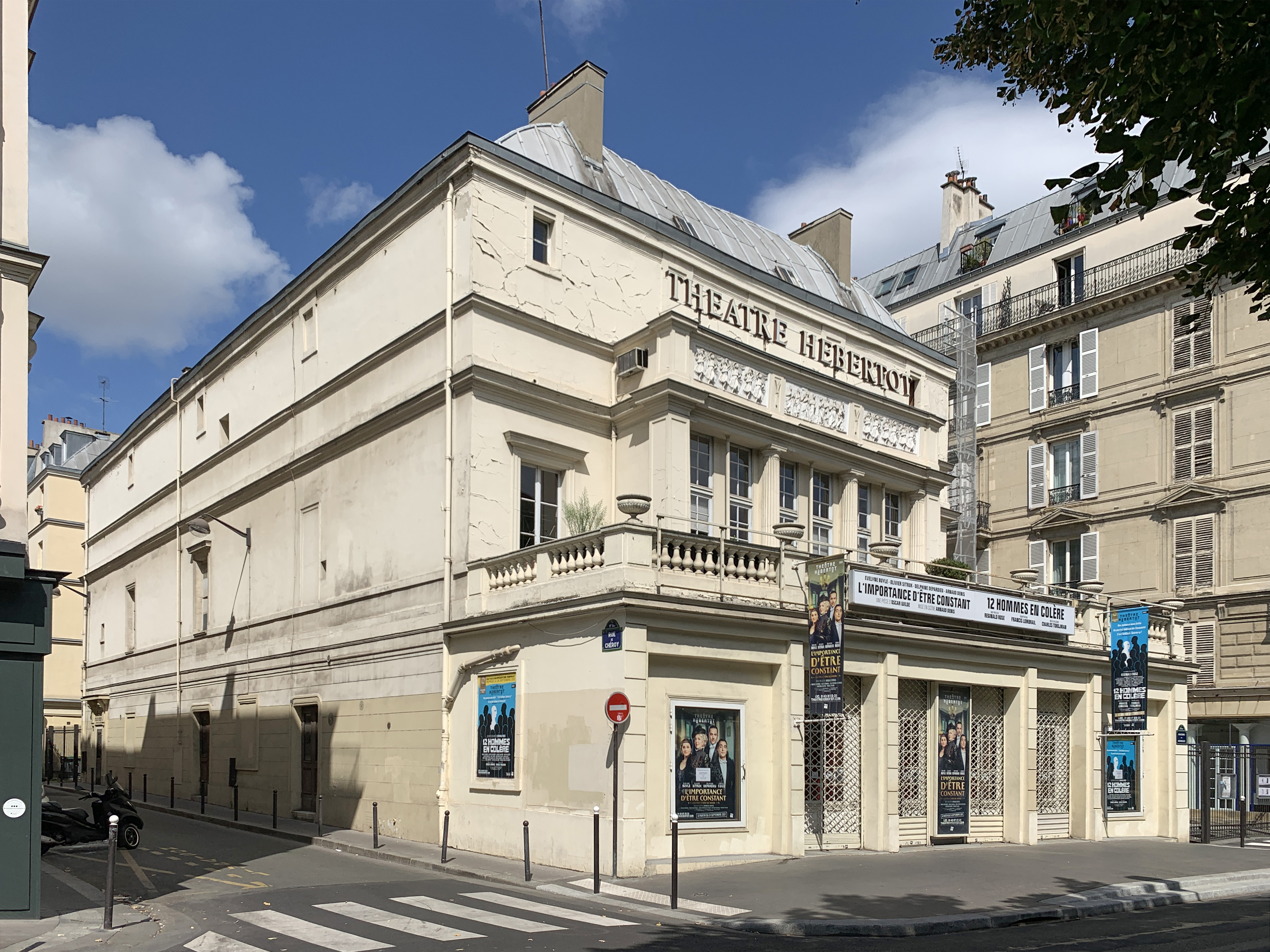
- The theater Hebertot in 2021
- Interactive map of Théâtre Hébertot
- Address: 78 boulevard des Batignolles; Paris
- Capacity: 630 (main theatre); 110 (small theatre)
- Public transit: Villiers; Rome

Construction
- Opened: 1838

Website
- www.theatrehebertot.com

Théâtre Hébertot (French pronunciation: [teɑtʁ ebɛʁto]) is a theatre at 78, boulevard des Batignolles, in the 17th arrondissement of Paris, France.

== History ==
The theatre was completed in 1838 and opened as the Théâtre des Batignolles. It was later renamed Théâtre des Arts in 1907. Jacques Rouché was the director of the theatre from 1910 to 1913. It acquired its present name in 1940 after playwright and journalist Jacques Hébertot.

== Current Use ==
Théâtre Hébertot has a seating capacity of 630 for the main stage, and completed construction on a smaller stage, l'Petit Hébertot, in 2001. The Hebertot is one of the few Paris theaters that has shows both English and French.

Danièle and Pierre Franck are its current directors.

== Productions ==
- 1911: Le Chagrin dans le palais de Han (Grief at the Han Palace) by Louis Laloy, directed by Jacques Rouché
- 1913: L'incoronazione di Poppea by Claudio Monteverdi, produced by Jacques Rouché
- 1925: Henry IV by Luigi Pirandello, directed by Georges Pitoëff
- 1925: Saint Joan by George Bernard Shaw, directed by Georges Pitoëff
- 1925: Le Juif du pape by Edmond Fleg, directed by Georges Pitoëff
- 1925: Le Lâche by Henri-René Lenormand, directed by Georges Pitoëff
- 1925: L'Assoiffé by A. Derera, directed by Georges Pitoëff
- 1926: L'Un d'eux by Émile Mazaud, directed by Georges Pitoëff
- 1926: L'Âme en peine by Jean-Jacques Bernard, directed by Georges Pitoëff
- 1926: Comme ci (ou comme ça) by Luigi Pirandello, directed by Georges Pitoëff
- 1926: Orphée by Jean Cocteau, directed by Georges Pitoëff
- 1926: Et dzim la la... by Marcel Achard, directed by Georges Pitoëff
- 1926: Sardanapale by Boussac de Saint-Marc, directed by Georges Pitoëff
- 1926: Jean Le Maufranc by Jules Romains, directed by Georges Pitoëff
- 1927: Le Marchand de regrets by Fernand Crommelynck, directed by Georges Pitoëff
- 1938: Le bal des voleurs by Jean Anouilh, directed by André Barsacq, with Jean Dasté, Michel Vitold and Maurice Jacquemont
- 1944: Néron by Jean Bacheville, directed by Alfred Pasquali, with Marcelle Géniat and Georges Marchal
- 1945: Caligula by Albert Camus, directed by Paul Œttly, with Gérard Philipe, Michel Bouquet, Georges Vitaly
- 1949: Les Justes by Albert Camus, directed by Paul Œttly, with María Casares, Michel Bouquet, Serge Reggiani
- 1953: La Maison de la nuit by Thierry Maulnier, directed by Marcelle Tassencourt with Pierre Vaneck, and Michel Vitold
- 1954: Pour le roi de Prusse written and directed by Maurice Bray
- 1956: Lady Windermere's Fan by Oscar Wilde, directed by Marcelle Tassencourt
- 1959: Long Day's Journey into Night by Eugene O'Neill, directed by Marcelle Tassencourt
- 1964: Yerma by Federico García Lorca, directed by Bernard Jenny, with Loleh Bellon
- 1965: The Collection and The Lover by Harold Pinter, directed by Claude Régy, with Delphine Seyrig, Jean Rochefort, Michel Bouquet
- 1966: The Three Sisters by Anton Tchekov, adaptation by Georges Pitoëff and Pierre Jean Jouve, directed by André Barsacq with Marina Vlady, Odile Versois and Hélène Vallier
- 1976: Le Jardin de craie by Enid Bagnold
- 1987: Une chambre sur la Dordogne by Claude Rich, directed by Jorge Lavelli
- 1987: L'Idée fixe by Paul Valéry, directed by Bernard Murat, with Pierre Arditi
- 1989: La vie que je t'ai donnée by Luigi Pirandello, directed by Michel Dumoulin, with María Casares
- 1998: « Art » by Yasmina Reza with Pierre Vaneck, Jean Rochefort and Jean-Louis Trintignant
- 1998: L'Atelier by Jean-Claude Grumberg, directed by Gildas Bourdet
- 1999: Raisons dey famille by Gérald Aubert, directed by Gildas Bourdet with Jacques Gamblin, Geneviève Fontanel
- 2001: Les Fausses Confidences by Pierre Carlet de Chamblain de Marivaux, directed by Gildas Bourdet, with Danièle Lebrun and Gérard Desarthe
- 2002: Comédie sur un quai de gare by Samuel Benchetrit, with Marie and Jean-Louis Trintignant
- 2004: Le roi se meurt by Eugène Ionesco, directed by Georges Werler, with Michel Bouquet and Juliette Carré
- 2005: Moins 2 written and directed by Samuel Benchetrit, with Jean-Louis Trintignant and Roger Dumas
- 2005: Le journal de Jules Renard by Jules Renard
- 2006: Doute by John Patrick Shanley, directed by Roman Polanski, with Thierry Frémont
- 2006: Opus Cœur by Israel Horovitz, directed by Stéphan Meldegg, with Pierre Vaneck and Astrid Veillon
- 2007: Irrésistible by Fabrice Roger-Lacan, directed by Isabelle Nanty, with Virginie Ledoyen and Arié Elmaleh
- 2007: Thalasso by Amanda Sthers, directed by Stéphan Guérin-Tillié, with Gérard Darmon, Thierry Frémont
- 2008: L'antichambre by Jean-Claude Brisville, directed by Christophe Lidon, with Danièle Lebrun, Sarah Biasini, Roger Dumas
- 2009: Cochons d'Inde by Sébastien Thiéry, directed by Anne Bourgeois, with Patrick Chesnais, Josiane Stoléru
- 2009: Jules et Marcel after the correspondence between Raimu and Marcel Pagnol, directed by Jean-Pierre Bernard, with Michel Galabru, Philippe Caubère
- 2009: La serva amorosa by Carlo Goldoni, directed by Christophe Lidon, with Robert Hirsch, Clémentine Célarié, Claire Nadeau
- 2010: The Master Builder by Henrik Ibsen, directed by Hans Peter Cloos, with Jacques Weber, Mélanie Doutey, Édith Scob
- 2010: Éclats by vie written and directed by Jacques Weber, with Jacques Weber
- 2011: Toutou by Agnès and Daniel Besse, directed by Anne Bourgeois, with Patrick Chesnais, Josiane Stoléru and Sam Karmann
