= Thieves' Carnival =

1938 play written by French playwright Jean Anouilh

Le Bal des Voleurs
- Original language: French
- Written by: Jean Anouilh
- Genre: Comedy ballet

Premiere
- Date: 17 August 1938
- Place: Théâtre des Arts; Paris, France

Le Bal des Voleurs (Thieves' Carnival) is a play written by French playwright Jean Anouilh, first staged at Théâtre des Arts, Paris on 17 August 1938.

== Later productions ==
Thieves' Carnival was presented on the televised series The Play of the Week in 1959.

== Awards and nominations ==
- 1955 Vernon Rice Award for Best Production (Drama Desk Awards)
