= Miracles Only Happen Once =

1951 film

- Directed by: Yves Allégret
- Written by: Jacques Sigurd
- Produced by: Sacha Gordine
- Starring: Jean Marais; Alida Valli; Marcelle Arnold
- Cinematography: Jean Isnard
- Edited by: Maurice Serein
- Music by: Louis Beydts
- Production companies: Films Sacha Gordine; Excelsa Film
- Distributed by: Gamma-Jeannic Films
- Release date: 18 May 1951
- Running time: 98 minutes
- Countries: France; Italy
- Language: French
- Box office: 1,239,492 admissions (France)

Miracles Only Happen Once (French: Les miracles n'ont lieu qu'une fois, Italian: I miracoli non si ripetono) is a 1951 French-Italian drama film directed by Yves Allégret and starring Jean Marais, Alida Valli and Marcelle Arnold. The film is about a "psychic war-casualty" played by Jean Marais.

== Synopsis ==
The educational year is ending and Jérôme, a medical student, is on the point of leaving on holiday to Brittany with friends. However he remains pensive and regrets not having approached Claudia, an Italian student, who must leave France the same evening. So he decides to go to her hotel. The two young people acknowledge their mutual love and Jérôme accompanies Claudia to the station and promises to join her in Tuscany the next month, as soon as he finds enough money. In Tuscany, Jérôme realizes that he seriously loves Claudia and proposes marriage to her. The two lovers return to their hotel but the city is agitated: war has just been declared. Jérôme learns from the consulate that he has been mobilised and that he must return. Separated by the war and no longer able to correspond, Jérôme loses track of Claudia. He will try to forget her by remaking his life, but haunted by the memory of this lost love, he will not succeed. Eleven years later, he leaves for Italy to try to find her, but time has passed...

== Cast ==
- Alida Valli as Claudia
- Jean Marais as Jérôme
- Marcelle Arnold as the bar owner
- Christine Chesnay as Jérôme's wife
- Charles Rutherford as the American
- Dedi Ristori as Little Francesca
- Aldo Moschino as the doctor
- Emma Baron as the hotel owner
- Nada Fiorelli as Maria Forni
- Edmond Ardisson as an employee
- Daniel Ceccaldi as a friend of Jérôme
- Jacques Denoël as a friend of Jérôme

== Bibliography ==
- Cardullo, Bert. Five French Filmmakers: Renoir, Bresson, Tati, Truffaut, Rohmer : Essays and Interviews. Cambridge Scholars Publishing, 2008.
- Hain, Milan. Starmaker: David O. Selznick and the Production of Stars in the Hollywood Studio System. University Press of Mississippi, 2023.
