= The Gambler (1958 film) =

1958 film by Claude Autant-Lara

- Directed by: Claude Autant-Lara
- Written by: Fyodor Dostoevsky (novel); Jean Aurenche; François Boyer; Pierre Bost
- Produced by: Ralph Baum
- Starring: Gérard Philipe; Liselotte Pulver; Françoise Rosay
- Cinematography: Jacques Natteau
- Edited by: Madeleine Gug
- Music by: René Cloërec
- Production companies: Franco London Films; Zebra Films
- Distributed by: Gaumont Distribution
- Release date: 26 October 1958
- Running time: 102 minutes
- Countries: France; Italy
- Language: French
- Box office: 937,475 admissions (France)

The Gambler (French: Le joueur) is a 1958 French-Italian drama film directed by Claude Autant-Lara and starring Gérard Philipe, Liselotte Pulver and Françoise Rosay. It is an adaptation of Fyodor Dostoevsky's 1866 novel The Gambler.

The film's sets were designed by the art director Max Douy. It was shot at the Billancourt Studios in Paris. It was made in Eastmancolor.

== Cast ==
- Gérard Philipe as Alixei Ivanovitch
- Liselotte Pulver as Pauline Zagorianski
- Françoise Rosay as La tante Antonia
- Jean Danet as Marquis des Grieux
- Jean-Max as Le directeur de la banque
- Nadine Alari as Blanche de Cominges
- Sacha Pitoëff as Afpley
- Suzanne Dantès as Mme de Cominges
- Paul Esser
- Pierre Jourdan
- Julien Carette as Bagdovitch
- Bernard Blier as Le Général Zagoriensky
- Georges Bever as Un majordome au bal
- Corrado Guarducci as Un joueur italien
- Mona Dol as La baronne
- Richard Francoeur as Le portier de l'hôtel
- Gib Grossac as Un joueur
- Alice Sapritch as Marfa
- Jean Imbert
- Georges Lycan as Un joueur
- Roger Tréville as Un joueur anglais
- Hans Verner
- Jacques Marin as L'employé du casino qui cherche sous la table

== Bibliography ==
- James Monaco. The Encyclopedia of Film. Perigee Books, 1991.
