= Marcelle Arnold =

French actress

- Born: 4 May 1917; Thonon-les-Bains, Haute-Savoie, France
- Died: 31 March 2010 (aged 92); Manosque, Alpes-de-Haute-Provence, France
- Occupation: Actress
- Years active: 1948-1981 (film)

Marcelle Arnold (4 May 1917 – 31 March 2010) was a French film, stage and television actress.

== Selected filmography ==
- Dédée d'Anvers (1948) - Magda - la prostituée au perroquet
- All Roads Lead to Rome (1949) - Hermine
- Keep an Eye on Amelia (1949) - La dame en mauve
- No Pity for Women (1950) - (uncredited)
- Le Sabre de mon père (1951) - Flore Médard
- Without Leaving an Address (1951) - Marguerite Forestier - la femme du dentiste
- Mr. Peek-a-Boo (1951) - Germaine
- Juliette, or Key of Dreams (1951) - La femme acariâtre
- Miracles Only Happen Once (1951) - La patronne du bar
- The Night Is My Kingdom (1951) - Germaine Latour
- Piédalu in Paris (1951)
- La Poison (1951) - Germaine (uncredited)
- Trois vieilles filles en folie (1952) - Joséphine
- Agence matrimoniale (1952) - (uncredited)
- La forêt de l'adieu (1952) - Hélène Queyrian
- Three Women (1952) - L'Anglaise
- Farewell Paris (1952) - Virginie
- Piédalu Works Miracles (1952)
- The Drunkard (1953) - Madame Fournier (uncredited)
- Les Compagnes de la nuit (1953) - 1ère assistante
- Children of Love (1953) - Une femme voulant adopter un enfant
- My Brother from Senegal (1953) - Mlle Angèle
- Service Entrance (1954) - Madame Courbessac
- People of No Importance (1956) - La concierge
- Marie Antoinette Queen of France (1956) - Mme. Adélaïde
- The Bride Is Much Too Beautiful (1956) - Mme. Victoire
- The Suspects (1957) - Lynda
- Ce joli monde (1957) - Marjorie Cleanwater, la romancière
- Secrets of a French Nurse (1958) - Madame Debrais
- Péché de jeunesse (1958) - La pâtissière Madame Rapine
- Croquemitoufle (1959) - (uncredited)
- Les amants de demain (1959)
- Lovers on a Tightrope (1960) - La standardiste
- The Seven Deadly Sins (1961) - L'épouse de Valentin (segment "Gourmandise, La")
- A Monkey in Winter (1962) - L'infirmière de la pension / Nurse
- Carom Shots (1963) - Mademoiselle Andréa
- The Reluctant Spy (1963) - Mlle Morin
- Pleins feux sur Stanislas (1965) - Morin
- Faites donc plaisir aux amis (1969) - Mme Barjon
- The Things of Life (1970) - La mère d'Hélène
- Où est passé Tom? (1971)
- Na! (1973)
- Un oursin dans la poche (1977) - La tantiette
- Est-ce bien raisonnable? (1981) - (final film role)

== Bibliography ==
- Edward Baron Turk. Child of Paradise: Marcel Carné and the Golden Age of French Cinema. Harvard University Press, 1989.
