= Les Petites du quai aux fleurs =

- Directed by: Marc Allégret
- Written by: Marcel Achard; Jean Aurenche
- Starring: Louis Jourdan; Odette Joyeux; André Lefaur; Gérard Philipe
- Release date: 1944
- Country: France
- Language: French
- Box office: 5,861 admissions (France)

Les Petites du quai aux fleurs is a French film.

== Plot ==
A bookshop owner has four daughters who have romantic troubles.
