= The Proud and the Beautiful =

1953 film by Yves Allégret

The Proud and the Beautiful Les Orgueilleux
- Directed by: Yves Allégret; Rafael E. Portas
- Written by: Jean-Paul Sartre (story: Typhus); Yves Allégret (adaptation); Jean Aurenche (scenario and dialogue); Jean Clouzot (dialogue)
- Produced by: Raymond Borderie; Salvador Elizondo
- Starring: Michèle Morgan; Gérard Philipe; Carlos López Moctezuma; Roberto Manuel Mendoza
- Cinematography: Alex Phillips
- Edited by: Claude Nicole
- Music by: Paul Misraki
- Distributed by: Columbia Pictures (France)
- Release date: 25 November 1953 (France)
- Running time: 103 minutes
- Countries: France; Mexico
- Language: French
- Box office: 2,805,061 admissions (France)

The Proud and the Beautiful (French: Les Orgueilleux, sub-title: Alvarado, aka The Proud Ones) is a 1953 drama film directed by Yves Allégret. It was nominated for the Academy Award for Best Story (the nomination officially went to Jean-Paul Sartre), but lost to Dalton Trumbo (under the pseudonym Robert Rich) for The Brave One.

== Cast ==
- Michèle Morgan as Nellie, a beautiful French tourist, whose husband suddenly dies, leaving her without resource in a foreign squalid village.
- Gérard Philipe as Georges, a castaway drunkard, bubble of the local mob, formerly French M.D.
- Carlos López Moctezuma as "el doctor", the local worn-out M.D.
- Víctor Manuel Mendoza as Don Rodrigo, the local god-father, a typical bullying macho.
- Michèle Cordoue as Anna, Don Rodrigo's harsh and vulgar French wife.
- André Toffel as Tom, a French tourist stopping to die of meningitis in Alvarado
- Arturo Soto Rangel as the local priest.
- Luis Buñuel as one of Don Rodrigo's gun-bearers. The realistic-satirical description of the plague, along with numerous local spicy private jokes in the abundant Spanish part of the dialogue certainly owes a lot to the guest-star's presence.
