= Dédée d'Anvers =

1948 French film

- Directed by: Yves Allégret
- Written by: Jacques Sigurd (adaptation); Yves Allégret (adaptation); Jacques Sigurd (dialogue)
- Based on: Dédée d'Anvers by Henri La Barthe (as Ashelbé)
- Produced by: Sacha Gordine
- Starring: Bernard Blier; Simone Signoret; Marcello Pagliero; Marcel Dalio
- Cinematography: Jean Bourgoin
- Edited by: Léonide Azar
- Music by: Jacques Besse
- Color process: Black and white
- Production company: Films Sacha Gordine
- Distributed by: DisCina
- Release date: 3 September 1948 (France)
- Running time: 90 minutes
- Country: France
- Language: French

Woman of Antwerp or Dédée of Antwerp (French: Dédée d'Anvers pronounced [dede dɑ̃vɛʁ]) is a 1948 French crime drama film directed by Yves Allégret and starring Bernard Blier, Simone Signoret, Marcello Pagliero and Marcel Dalio. The film was released in English-speaking markets under the titles Dedee and Woman of Antwerp.

== Plot ==
Forced to leave France, Dédée and her bullying pimp Marco have reached Antwerp, where she is one of the girls in René's bar and Marco is the doorman, doing drug deals on the side. Taking a stroll by the docks in the early evening, Dédée meets Francesco, sympathetic Italian captain of a cargo ship, who knows René. When he comes later to the bar, he discusses some secret deal with René and then takes Dédée to a hotel for the night.

The two have fallen for each other and he would like to take her away with him, but this would need the agreement of René and of Marco. René is happy to do a favour to Francesco, happy to free Dédée from the obnoxious Marco, whom he throws out into the street, and says he is happy to drive Dédée to Francesco's ship once he has closed the bar for the night.

While Francesco is waiting on the jetty for Dédée to appear, Marco shoots him dead, drops his gun, and disappears. When René and Dédée arrive to find the body, they comb the nightspots of the city in search of Marco, eventually catching him at the railway station. At gunpoint they take him to a lonely spot where René, after knocking him out, runs the car over him.

== Cast ==
- Bernard Blier as Monsier René
- Simone Signoret as Dédée
- Marcello Pagliero as Francesco (as Marcel Pagliero)
- Marcel Dalio as Marco
- Jane Marken as Germaine
- Marcel Dieudonné as Le trafiquant
- Mia Mendelson as Felice - la prostituée flamande
- Marcelle Arnold as Magda - la prostituée au perroquet
- Claude Farell as La prostituée allemande (as Catherine Farrell)
- Denise Clair as La patronne du "Kaffe Karel"
- Gabriel Gobin as Paul
- Jo Van Cottom as Le diamantaire (as J. Von Cottom)
- Jane Marken as Germaine
