= Desperate Decision =

1952 film

- Directed by: Yves Allégret
- Written by: Catherine Beauchamp; Jacques Sigurd
- Produced by: Ray Ventura
- Starring: Danièle Delorme; Henri Vidal; Jean Debucourt
- Cinematography: Roger Hubert
- Edited by: Claude Nicole
- Music by: Paul Misraki
- Production company: Hoche Productions
- Distributed by: Cocinor
- Release date: 1 October 1952
- Running time: 84 minutes
- Country: France
- Language: French

Desperate Decision (French: La jeune folle) is a 1952 French drama film directed by Yves Allégret and starring Danièle Delorme, Henri Vidal and Jean Debucourt. It was shot at the Joinville Studios in Paris. The film's sets were designed by the art director Alexandre Trauner.

== Synopsis ==
In 1922 during the Irish Civil War, a young woman Catherine heads to Dublin seeking vengeance on the man who killed her brother. She meets a man Steve who wishes to protect her as she is teetering on the edge of madness. However, when she discovers that he is the murderer she takes her revenge.

== Cast ==
- Danièle Delorme as Catherine
- Henri Vidal as Steve
- Jean Debucourt as Le messager / A Mysterious Man
- Jacqueline Porel as Mother Superior
- Georges Chamarat as Le chef de gare
- Olivier Hussenot as Le colleur d'affiches
- Jacques Dynam as Le consommateur
- Michel Etcheverry as Le prêtre
- Gabrielle Fontan as Soeur Patricia
- Joëlle Bernard as La femme ivre
- Maurice Ronet as Jim
- Nicolas Vogel as Tom
- Marcel Journet as Le chef de police Donovan
- Madeleine Gérôme as Madame Donovan
- Gabriel Gobin as L'employé de la gare
- Madeleine Barbulée as La voyageuse
- Lolita De Silva as Soeur Ruth

== Bibliography ==
- Bessy, Maurice & Chirat, Raymond. Histoire du cinéma français: 1951–1955. Pygmalion, 1989.
- Rège, Philippe. Encyclopedia of French Film Directors, Volume 1. Scarecrow Press, 2009.
