= Manèges =

- Manèges French release poster
- Directed by: Yves Allégret
- Written by: Jacques Sigurd
- Produced by: Émile Natan; André Paulvé
- Starring: Simone Signoret; Bernard Blier; Jane Marken
- Cinematography: Jean Bourgouin
- Edited by: Suzanne Girardin; Maurice Serein
- Music by: —
- Production company: Les Films Modernes
- Distributed by: DisCina
- Release date: 25 January 1950
- Running time: 91 minutes
- Country: France
- Language: French

Manèges is a French film directed by Yves Allégret and released in 1950. The film stars Simone Signoret (married at the time to Allégret, although the marriage came to an end soon after), Bernard Blier and Jane Marken. It is shot in black-and-white in film noir style, with extensive use of flashback and the voiceover of characters' unspoken thoughts. Manèges is noted for the exceptionally harsh and cynical manner in which Allégret delineates the characters of his two female leads, and has been accused of being misogynistic in tone. It was shot at the Neuilly Studios in Paris. The film's sets were designed by the art directors Auguste Capelier and Alexandre Trauner.

The film was released in English-speaking markets under various titles, including The Wanton, The Cheat and The Riding School.

== Plot ==
Robert (Bernard Blier), a riding school owner, and his wife Dora (Simone Signoret) have a seemingly happy marriage until Dora is critically injured in a road accident, not shown on screen. Robert and Dora's mother (Jane Marken) rush to the hospital to which she has been taken. Believing she is about to die, Dora spitefully asks her mother – a vulgar, tawdry and heavy-drinking woman – to put Robert in the picture regarding the true nature of the marriage, so that she can die gloating over his distress.

As Dora is taken to the operating theatre, her mother takes vicious pleasure in informing Robert – who has been reflecting with sadness about happy times and the prospect of losing his wife – that the marriage has been a sham from the start. Via a series of flashbacks, it is revealed that Dora is a manipulative, conniving and amoral gold-digger. Encouraged by her equally unprincipled mother, she set out to snare Robert purely for access to his finances in order that she (and her mother, to whom she has siphoned off significant amounts of money) could live a life of ease and outward respectability. In fact she has always despised Robert, mocking his unsuspicious nature and gullibility while amusing herself with a string of lovers. With the riding school business recently failing, Dora had decided that she had taken Robert for as much as she could, and had been planning to leave him for François, a richer lover who could further her social-climbing ambitions. But François goes away without warning, leaving Dora devastated.

News comes through from the operating theatre that Dora will live, but is permanently paralysed. Robert states his intention to abandon her to her fate, leaving the mother alone with the prospect of having to care for her disabled daughter in straitened financial circumstances.

== Cast ==
- Simone Signoret as Dora
- Bernard Blier as Robert
- Jane Marken as Dora's mother (unnamed in the film)
- Franck Villard as François
- Jacques Baumer as Louis
- Mona Dol as Head Nurse
- Jean Ozenne as Éric
- Gabriel Gobin as Émile
