= Beauty and the Devil =

La Beauté du diable Beauty and the Devil
- original movie poster
- Directed by: René Clair
- Written by: René Clair; Armand Salacrou
- Produced by: Salvo D'Angelo
- Starring: Michel Simon; Gérard Philipe
- Cinematography: Michel Kelber
- Edited by: James Cuenet
- Music by: Roman Vlad
- Distributed by: Les Films Corona (France); ENIC (Italy)
- Release dates: 16 March 1950 (France); 14 April 1950 (Italy)
- Running time: 96 minutes
- Countries: France; Italy
- Language: French
- Box office: 2,538,884 admissions (France)

La Beauté du diable (literally "the beauty of the devil"; originally released in the UK and US as Beauty and the Devil) is a 1950 Franco-Italian fantasy film drama directed by René Clair. A tragicomedy set in the early 19th century, it is about an ageing alchemist, Henri Faust, who is given the chance to be eternally young by the devil Mephistopheles. It is loosely adapted from the classic early 19th-century verse play Faust by Johann Wolfgang von Goethe.

== Cast ==
- Michel Simon as Mephistopheles / Old Professor Henri Faust
- Gérard Philipe as Young Henri Faust / Young-looking Mephistopheles
- Nicole Besnard as Marguerite, the gypsy girl
- Raymond Cordy as Antoine, the servant
- Simone Valère as La Princesse
- Carlo Ninchi as Le Prince
- Gaston Modot as Gypsy
- Tullio Carminati as Diplomat
- Paolo Stoppa as Official

== Release and reception ==
In 2013, the Cohen Film Collection released the Beauty and the Devil on DVD and Blu-ray. Besides the film, which was reconstructed (although with distorted audio during the title sequence), the discs offer a 2010 documentary on the film itself. Ian Jane of the DVDTalk said in his closing comments regarding the Blu-ray release: "Beauty Of The Devil is slick, it's stylish and it's wonderfully shot meaning that not only is the creative way in which the story is told compelling and interesting but that it is as much a treat for the eyes as it is for the mind. The performances are good and Clair does some interesting things with his take on the story of Faust. This may be an atypical take on the classic tale, but it works incredibly well."

== Awards ==
The film was nominated for Best Film at the 1951 BAFTA Awards and won two awards at the Italian National Syndicate of Film Journalists with a Silver Ribbon Best Actor award going to Michel Simon and best Best Production Design to Aldo Tommasini and Léon Barsacq.
