= All Roads Lead to Rome (1949 film) =

1949 film

- Directed by: Jean Boyer
- Written by: Jacques Sigurd
- Produced by: Jean Boyer; André Paulvé; Michel Safra
- Starring: Micheline Presle; Gerard Philippe; Albert Rémy
- Cinematography: Christian Matras
- Edited by: Jacques Desagneaux
- Music by: Paul Misraki
- Production company: Speva Films
- Distributed by: DisCina
- Release date: 16 September 1949
- Running time: 89 minutes
- Country: France
- Language: French

All Roads Lead to Rome (French: Tous les chemins mènent à Rome) is a 1949 French comedy film directed by Jean Boyer and starring Micheline Presle, Gerard Philippe and Albert Rémy. It was shot at the Victorine Studios in Nice. The film's sets were designed by the art director Robert Clavel. The film had admissions of 1,434,128 at the French box office.

== Synopsis ==
Gabriel, a surveyor is on his way to a congress in Rome and runs into Laura a celebrated actress trying to travel incognito so she can avoid the journalists on her tail. He mistakenly believes she is being chased by criminals and does everything he can to help her evade then on the road to the Italian capital.

== Cast ==
- Micheline Presle as Laura Lee
- Gérard Philipe as Gabriel Pégase
- Marcelle Arnold as Hermine
- Albert Rémy as Edgar
- Marion Delbo as Mady
- Fernand Rauzéna as Le cambrioleurï
- Jacques Louvigny as L'ambassadeur

== Bibliography ==
- Hubert-Lacombe, Patricia. Le cinéma français dans la guerre froide: 1946-1956. L'Harmattan, 1996.
- Siehlohr, Ulrike . Heroines Without Heroes: Reconstructing Female and National Identities in European Cinema, 1945-1951. A&C Black, 2000.
