= The Best Part (film) =

- French: La Meilleure Part
- Directed by: Yves Allégret
- Written by: Yves Allégret; Jacques Sigurd; Philippe St-Gil
- Starring: Gérard Philipe
- Release date: 1956
- Running time: 90 minutes
- Countries: France; Italy
- Language: French

The Best Part (French: La Meilleure Part) is a 1956 French-Italian drama film directed by Yves Allégret and starring Gérard Philipe, around the construction of a dam in the Alps (in Aussois).

It had admissions in France of 1,976,595.

== Cast ==
- Gérard Philipe as Philippe Perrin
- Michèle Cordoue as Micheline
- Gérard Oury as Gérard Bailly
- Umberto Spadaro as Gino
- Georges Chamarat as Lemoigne
- Valeria Moriconi as Odette
- Olivier Hussenot as Colombin
