= Box of Dreams (film) =

1945 film

- Directed by: Yves Allégret; Jean Choux
- Written by: René Lefèvre; Viviane Romance; Yves Allégret
- Produced by: Cesare Marvasi; André Paulvé; Michele Scalera; Salvatore Scalera
- Starring: Viviane Romance; Henri Guisol; Frank Villard
- Cinematography: Jean Bourgoin
- Edited by: Jean Sacha
- Music by: Jean Marion
- Production companies: DisCina; Scalera Film
- Distributed by: DisCina
- Release date: 11 July 1945
- Running time: 100 minutes
- Country: France
- Language: French

Box of Dreams (French: La boîte aux rêves) is a 1945 French comedy drama film directed by Yves Allégret and Jean Choux and starring Viviane Romance, Henri Guisol and Frank Villard. Simone Signoret had a minor role in the film; she would later marry Allégret and collaborate with him on several films that contributed to her rise to stardom.

Filming originally began in 1943 during the Italian occupation of France but the film was not released until the end of the Second World War. The film's sets were designed by the art directors Auguste Capelier and Georges Wakhévitch. It was shot at the Cimex-controlled Saint-Laurent-du-Var Studios on the outskirts of Nice. The film had 2,792 admissions in France.

== Cast ==
- Viviane Romance as Nicole Payen-Laurel
- Henri Guisol as Pierre Forestier
- Frank Villard as Jean
- René Lefèvre as Marc
- Pierre Palau as Payen-Laurel
- Roland Armontel as Amédée
- Gisèle Alcée as Gisèle - la nouvelle bonne des quatre bohèmes
- Henri Bry as Pépito
- Mathilde Casadesus as L'Agitée
- Léonce Corne as Le parent
- Pierre-Louis as Alain
- Marguerite Pierry as Tante Lucie
- Robert Pizani as Oncle André
- Gaston Orbal as M. Lafont
- Simone Signoret as Une femme
- Gérard Philipe as Un homme

== Bibliography ==
- Hayward, Susan. Simone Signoret: The Star as Cultural Sign. Continuum, 2004.
