= Une si jolie petite plage =

- Une si jolie petite plage French release poster
- Directed by: Yves Allégret
- Written by: Jacques Sigurd
- Produced by: Emile Darbon
- Starring: Gérard Philipe; Madeleine Robinson; Jane Marken; Jean Servais
- Cinematography: Henri Alekan
- Edited by: Léonide Azar
- Music by: Maurice Thiriet
- Distributed by: Les Films Corona
- Release date: 19 January 1949
- Running time: 91 min.
- Country: France
- Language: French
- Box office: 849,005 admissions (France)

Une si jolie petite plage (English titles: Such a Pretty Little Beach and Riptide) is a French drama film shot in black-and-white, directed by Yves Allégret and released in 1949. The film stars Gérard Philipe, Madeleine Robinson and Jane Marken.

The film is set on the Channel coast of northern France, in a drab and depressing small seaside town being deluged by incessant rain. The film noir-influenced style emphasises the relentlessly downbeat, oppressive and claustrophobic atmosphere of the milieu. Location filming for Une si jolie petite plage took place in Barneville-Carteret in Lower Normandy.

== Synopsis ==
During the cold and rainy off-season a man (Gérard Philipe) arrives in a seaside town and, giving his name only as Pierre, checks into the only hotel which remains open. His arrival arouses curiosity and a degree of suspicion, as people note that he appears to know the area, yet gives no explanation for his presence at that bleak time of year in the dead-end town. The elderly father of the hotel owner, now a mute invalid, shows signs of recognition but his condition prevents him from voicing what he observes. Pierre is treated with barely disguised petty-minded intolerance and hostility by the hotel owner, guests and habitués, but develops a friendship with Marthe (Madeleine Robinson), an all-purpose employee at the hotel. Pierre also notices a 15-year-old boy – employed as a dogsbody at the hotel, where he has been placed by the local state-run orphanage – who he has spotted engaging in rendezvous with Mme Curlier, a middle-aged female guest. His attempts to engage the somewhat surly and reticent youth however meet with rebuff.

The arrival in the town of Fred (Jean Servais), an oily and seedy character on Pierre's trail, precipitates his fate. It transpires that Pierre's interest in the orphan boy arises from the fact that he sees in him an exact reflection of himself at the same age; Pierre too was raised in the same orphanage and was sent as a teenage boy to work in this hotel, where he was picked up by a predatory older woman, a well-known chanteuse who offered him escape to the bright lights of Paris. Over time however, his gigolo-type lifestyle with the woman became increasingly sordid and degrading. It is revealed that Pierre is now on the run, having just killed the singer, and has returned to the town of his childhood and adolescence in a vain attempt to try to find some inner peace. Instead his return has ended in complete desperation. Marthe, who by now has fallen in love with Pierre, does her best to help him through his despair, but it is not to be.

== Cast ==
- Madeleine Robinson as Marthe
- Gérard Philipe as Pierre Monet
- Jean Servais as Fred
- André Valmy as Georges
- Jane Marken as Mme. Mahieu
- Paul Villé as M. Curlier
- Christian Ferry as The Orphan
- Yves Martel as The Old Man
- Gabrielle Fontan as The Old Woman
- Gabriel Gobin as Arthur
- Mona Dol as Mme. Curlier
- Julien Carette as The Traveling Salesman
