= Oh No, Mam'zelle =

1954 film

- Directed by: Yves Allégret
- Written by: Marcel Achard; Yves Allégret; Henri Meilhac (libretto); Albert Millaud (libretto)
- Produced by: Paris Films Production (Paris)
- Starring: Fernandel; Louis de Funès
- Music by: Georges Van Parys
- Distributed by: Lux Film
- Release date: 21 April 1954 (France)
- Running time: 90 minutes
- Countries: France; Italy
- Language: French

Oh No, Mam'zelle (French title: Mam'zelle Nitouche) is a French-Italian musical comedy film from 1954, directed by Yves Allégret, written by Marcel Achard, starring Fernandel and Louis de Funès.

== Cast ==
- Fernandel as Célestin the organist and Floridor the composer
- Pier Angeli as Denise de Flavigny and Mlle Nitouche
- Jean Debucourt as the commander major Léon de Longueville
- Renée Devillers as mother, sister of the commander
- Michèle Cordoue as Corinne, the actress, student of Floridor and lover of the commander
- François Guérin as the first lieutenant André La Vauzelle
- Nerio Bernardi as the Italian grocer who got hit by pots of flowers
- Hélène Tossy as wife of the commander major
- Georges Chamarat as the warrant officer
- Margo Lion as Léontine, the sister tourière
- Louis de Funès as the field marshal of homes Petrot
- Pierre Olaf, as a reserve officer
