= Georges Perros =

French writer

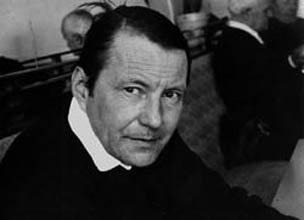
Georges Perros

Georges Perros (23 August 1923, Paris – 24 January 1978, Douarnenez) was a French writer. He was awarded the Prix Valery Larbaud in 1973.
