= Élie Allégret =

French Protestant pastor and missionary (1865–1940)

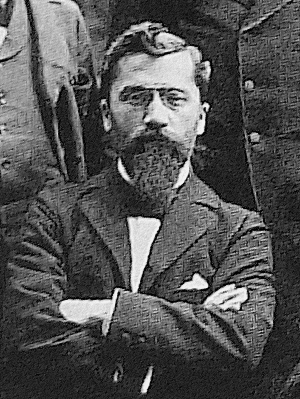
- Allégret in 1896
- Born: 8 January 1865; Lyon, France
- Died: 28 October 1940 (aged 75); Paris, France
- Occupations: Pastor; missionary
- Organization: Société des evangelical missions
- Spouse: Suzanne Ehrhardt (m. 1891)
- Children: 6, including Marc and Yves

Élie Allégret (French: [eli aleɡʁɛ]; 8 January 1865 – 28 October 1940) was a French Protestant pastor and missionary in Africa.

== Biography ==
Élie Allégret studied at the Protestant Faculty of Theology in Paris.

In 1885, he was invited by Juliette Rondeaux, widow of University of Paris law professor Paul Gide (1832–1880) and mother of writer André Gide, to the château de La Roque-Baignard to work as the private tutor of André and direct both his reading and his religious education.

In 1889, he became a pastor and was sent on a mission to Gabon, to the mission station of Talagouga.

In 1914, at the outbreak of World War I, Allégret, who had become a military chaplain, went on a mission to Cameroon before becoming co-director of the Paris Evangelical Missionary Society.

After the end of World War I, Allégret left on a mission around the world. Between July 1926 and February 1928, he traveled through Oceania.

== Family ==
En 1891, Élie Allégret married Suzanne Ehrhardt (1869–1950). They had six children: Jean-Paul (1894–1930), Éric (1896–1971), André, Marc (1900–1973), Yves (1905–1987) and Valentine (1909–1988). Jean-Paul and André were born in Talagouga, in Africa. Éric was born in Paris when Élie was working at the headquarters of the Paris Evangelical Missionary Society in Paris. Filmmaker Marc Allégret was born in Basel, Switzerland, followed by Yves Allégret, also a filmmaker, in Paris where the family had settled in 1903.

Élie Allégret is the biological grandfather of Catherine Allégret.

Suzanne Ehrhardt had a sister, Valentine Ehrhardt (1873–1906), who also participated in evangelical missions.

Allégret-Signoret-Montand-Castaldi family tree

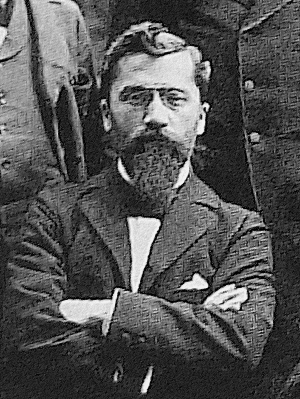
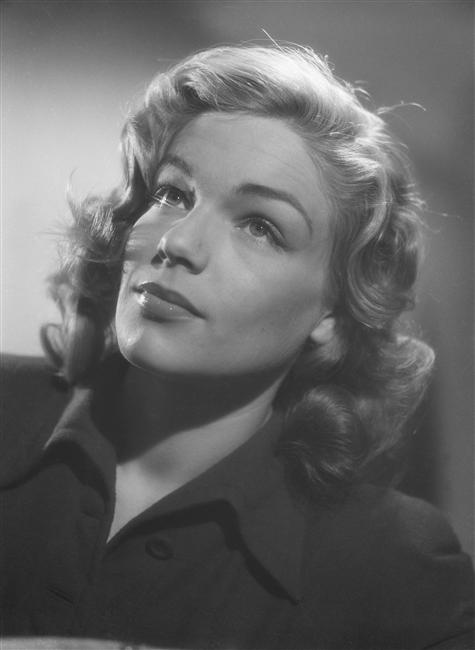
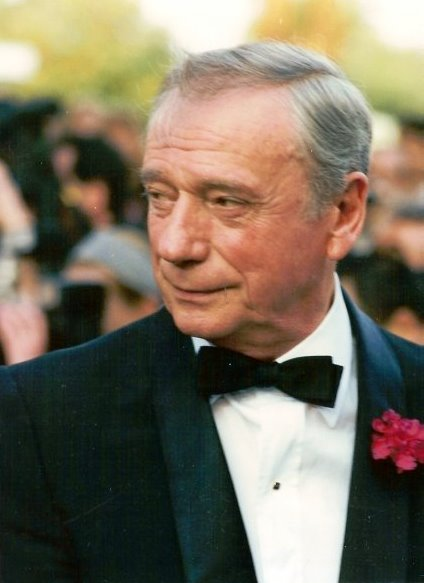
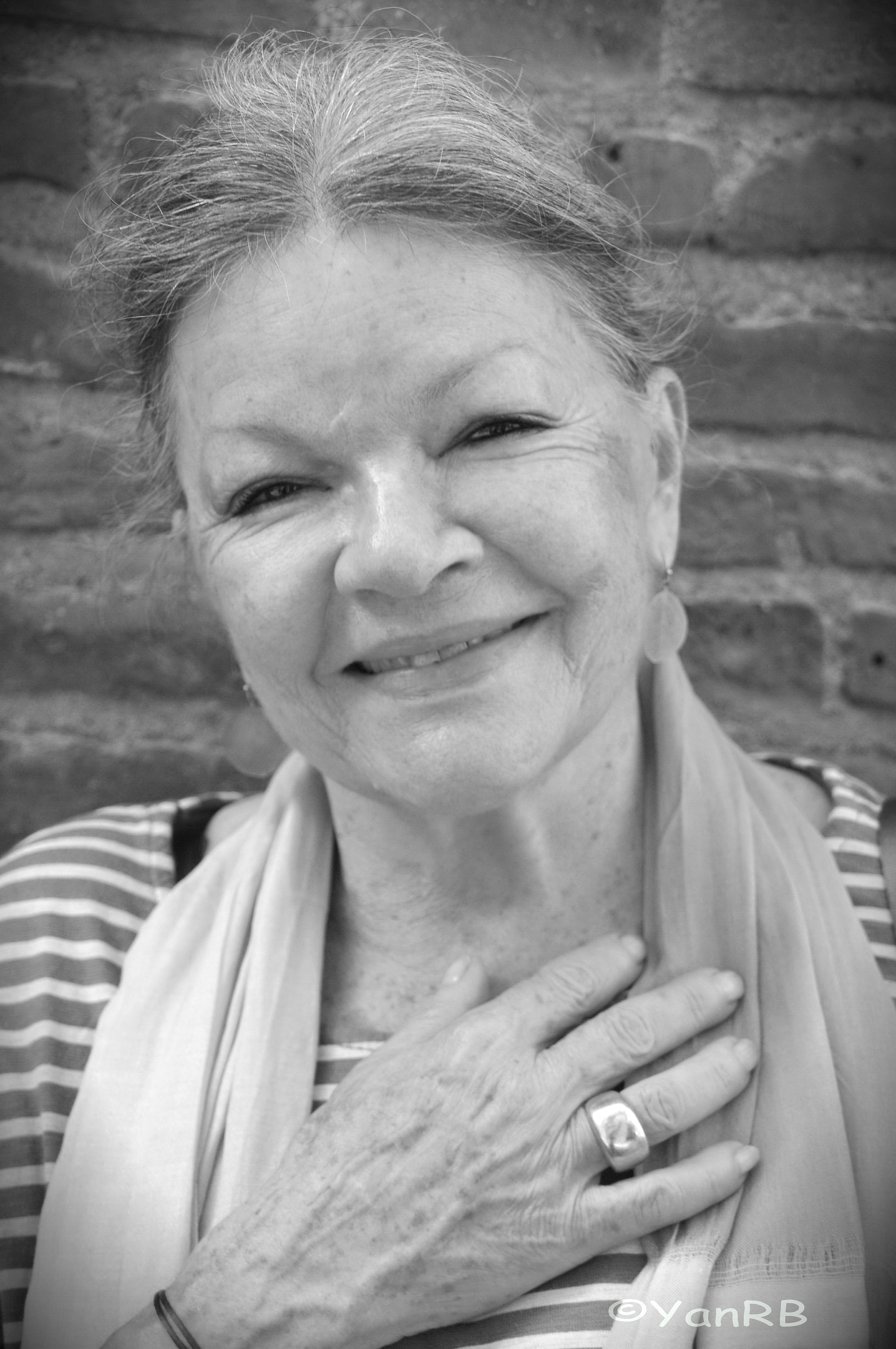
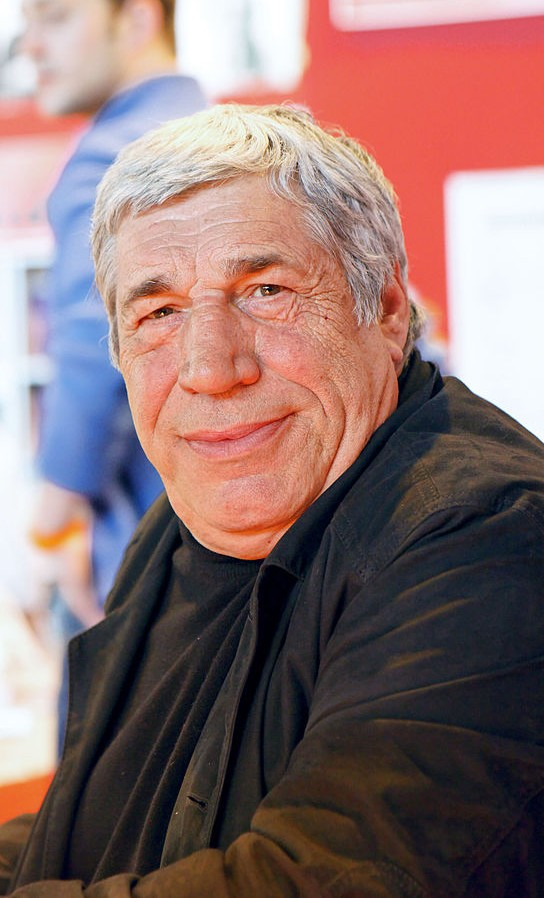
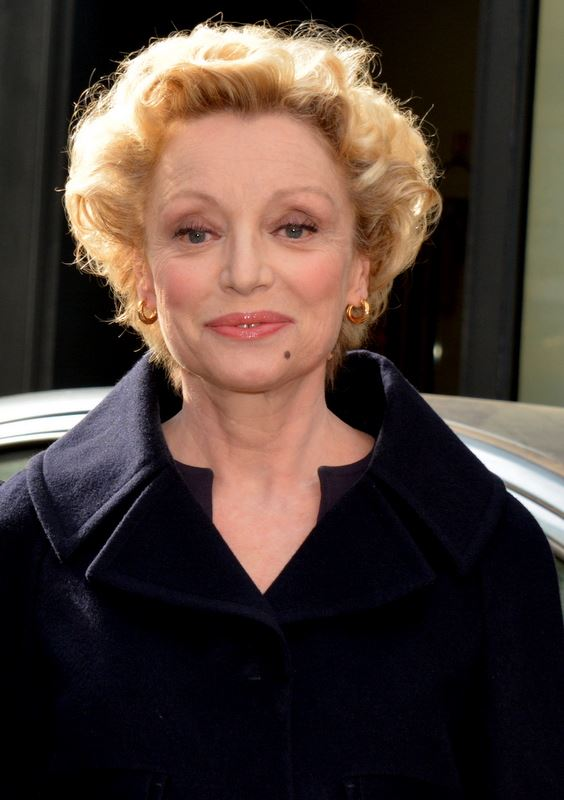
Élie; Allégret (1865–1940)	Suzanne; Ehrhardt (1869–1950)	André Kaminker (1888–1961)	Georgette; Signoret (1896–1984)	Giovanni; Livi (1891–1968)	Guiseppina; Simoni (1893–1971)
Marc; Allégret (1900–1973)	Yves; Allégret (1905–1987)	Simone; Signoret (1921–1985)	Yves; Montand (1921–1991)	Giuliano; Livi (1917–1994)
Maurice Vaudaux (1949)	Catherine; Allégret (1946)	Jean-Pierre; Castaldi (1944)	Tanya; Lopert (1942)	Jean-Louis; Livi (1941)	Caroline Silhol (1949)
Benjamin; Castaldi (1970)	Flavie; Flament (1974)

== Correspondence with André Gide ==
Allégret was the tutor and friend of the writer André Gide. The two met in 1885, and quickly developed a deep friendship.

In 1889, Allégret wrote whilst aboard the ship Portugal, en route to Gabon. A significant correspondence maintained their bond of friendship, especially during Allégret's long stays in Africa.

In 1914, after Élie Allégret departed for a mission of evangelization in Cameroon, Suzanne Allégret established her own correspondence with André Gide. Suzanne, matriarch of the family with six children, would recount in detail the activities of each, at the request of Gide.

== Honours and distinctions ==
- Namesake of the Collège Élie Allégret de Bandjoun
- 1909: honoris causa doctorate from the University of Geneva
- 1919: Chevalier of the Legion of Honour

== Bibliography ==
- Pierre Billard, André Gide et Marc Allégret, le roman secret, Plon, 2006
- Émilie Gangnat, Élie Allégret, in Patrick Cabanel and André Encrevé (dir.), Dictionnaire biographique des protestants français de 1787 à nos jours, tome 1 : A-C, Les Éditions de Paris Max Chaleil, Paris, 2015, p. 39-40 ISBN 978-2846211901
- Pierre Masson, Jean Claude, André Gide et l'écriture de soi, Presses Universitaires de Lyon, 2002
- Alexandra Loumpet-Galitzine, Njoya et le royaume bamoun, les archives de la Société des missions évangéliques de Paris, éditions Karthala, 2006.
- L'Enfance de l'art. Correspondances avec Élie Allégret (1886–1896). Letters of André Gide, Juliette Gide, Madeleine Rondeaux and Élie Allégret, edited by Daniel Durosay. Gallimard, Paris : 1998
- Why Do We Need the White Man’s God? African Contributions and Responses to the Formation of a Christian Movement in Cameroon, 1914–1968, Guy Alexander Thomas (PhD thesis) University of London, 2001
