= Leathernose =

- Directed by: Yves Allégret
- Written by: Jacques Sigurd
- Based on: Leather-Nose by Jean de La Varende
- Produced by: Pierre Cabaud; Paul-Edmond Decharme; Adrien Remaugé
- Starring: Jean Marais; Françoise Christophe; Mariella Lotti
- Cinematography: Roger Hubert
- Edited by: Claude Nicole
- Music by: Georges Auric
- Production companies: Société Nouvelle Pathé Cinéma; Società Italiana Cines
- Distributed by: Alcina (Italy); Pathé Consortium Cinéma (France)
- Release date: 26 March 1952
- Running time: 92 minutes
- Countries: Italy; France
- Language: Italian
- Box office: 1,738,723 admissions (France)

Leathernose (French: Nez de cuir, Italian: Naso di cuoio) is a 1952 French-Italian historical drama film directed by Yves Allégret and starring Jean Marais, Françoise Christophe and Mariella Lotti. It is an adaptation of the 1936 novel by Jean de La Varende, set in France in the years after the Napoleonic Wars. It was shot at the Joinville Studios. The film's sets were designed by the art director Georges Wakhévitch.

== Main cast ==
- Jean Marais as Roger de Tainchebraye
- Françoise Christophe as Judith de Rieusses
- Jean Debucourt as Le marquis de Brives
- Mariella Lotti as Hélène Josias
- Massimo Girotti as Le docteur Marchal
- Yvonne de Bray as Marie-Bonne
- Valentine Tessier as Simone de Tainchebraye
- Marcel André as Josias
- Denis d'Inès as Le duc de Laval
- Françoise Prévost as Une jeune invitée
- Giani Esposito as Un jeune invité
- Yolande Laffon as Madame de Brigade - une vieille dame
- Madeleine Lambert as Une invitée
- Yves Massard as Un gentilhomme

== Bibliography ==
- Hayward, Susan. French Costume Drama of the 1950s: Fashioning Politics in Film. Intellect Books, 2010.
