= Anne Philipe =

French writer, ethnologist, and filmmaker (1917–1990)

Anne Philipe (born Anne Marie Nicole Ghislaine Navaux, June 20, 1917 – April 16, 1990) was a French writer, ethnologist, and documentary filmmaker.

== Biography ==
=== Early life and education ===
Born on June 20, 1917, in Brussels, Belgium, Anne Philipe was raised primarily by her mother following her parents' divorce shortly after her birth. She pursued higher education in philosophy in Belgium, earning a degree in the field.

=== Ethnographic work and travels ===
In December 1946, Philipe joined her husband in Nanjing, China, where he served as a cultural advisor at the French embassy. In 1948, anticipating the communist victory in China, they embarked on a journey along the ancient Silk Road, traveling with a caravan to Kashmir. This expedition made her the first French woman to cross the Xinjiang desert. During this time, she observed the plight of the Uyghur people and was received by the president of the Republic of East Turkestan.

Philipe's experiences during her travels deeply influenced her ethnographic work. She created documentaries focusing on Asia and Africa and was instrumental in founding the French Ethnographic Film Committee alongside notable figures such as Jean Rouch, Claude Lévi-Strauss, Edgar Morin, and Alain Resnais. She contributed articles to publications like Le Monde and Libération, covering topics ranging from Cuban and Venezuelan societies to Japanese cinema.

=== Literary career ===
The death of her husband profoundly impacted her, leading her to channel her grief into writing. Her debut book, Le Temps d’un soupir (1963), is an account of Gérard Philipe's final days and her journey through mourning.

Philipe's subsequent writings continued to explore themes of transience, memory, and the human condition. Her writing style, often compared to that of Marguerite Duras and Nathalie Sarraute, is characterized by its introspective and evocative nature. Philipe's works delve into the fleeting moments of joy, the omnipresence of death, and the intricate tapestry of human emotions.

Her notable works include:

- Le Temps d’un soupir (1963)
- Les Rendez-vous de la colline (1966)
- Spirale (1971)
- Ici, là-bas, ailleurs (1974)
- Un été près de la mer (1977)
- Promenade à Xian (1980)
- Les Résonances de l’amour (1982)
- Je l’écoute respirer (1984)
- Le Regard de Vincent (1987)

=== Death ===
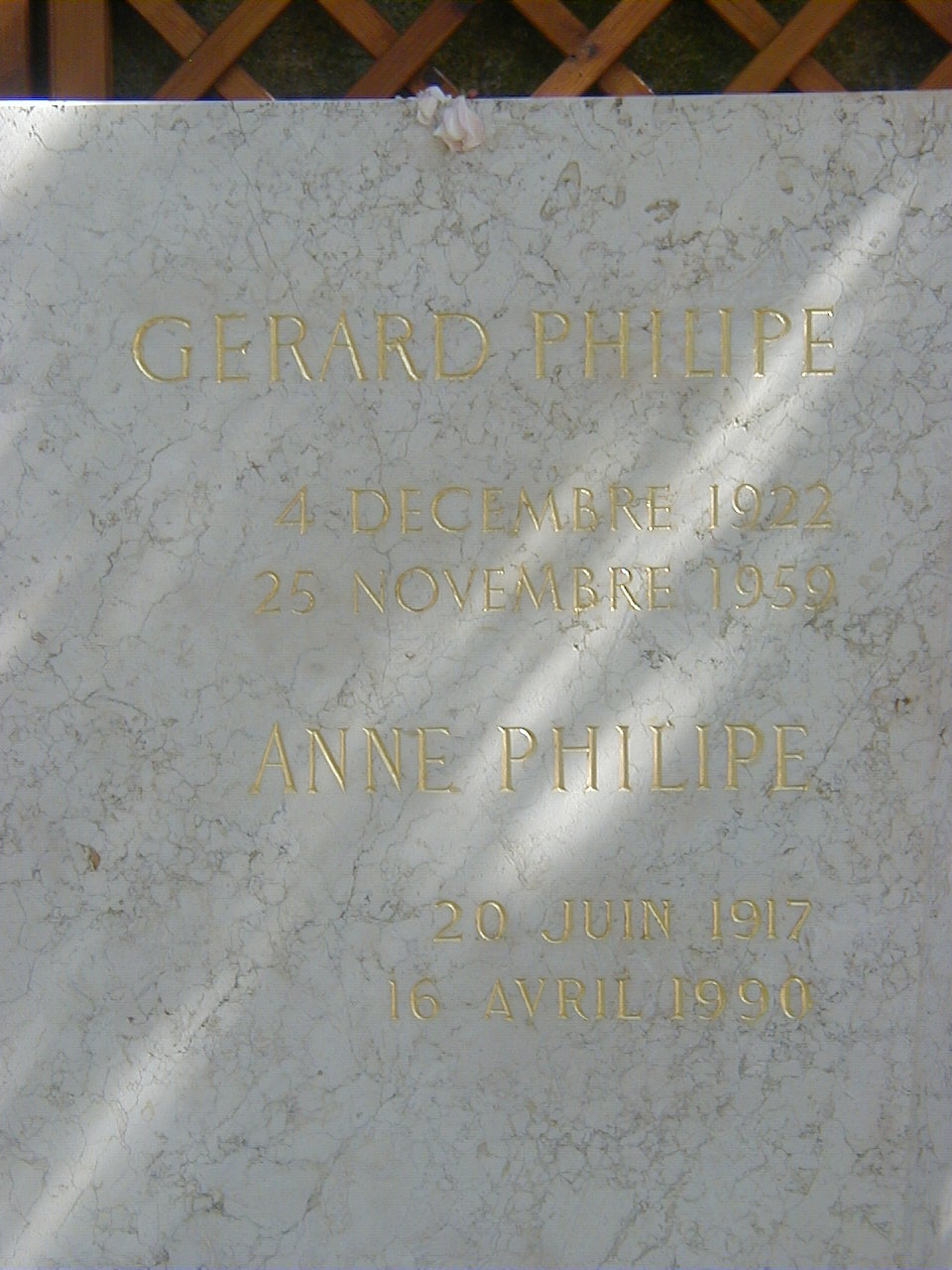
Tomb of Gérard and Anne Philipe.

Anne Philipe died in Paris on April 16, 1990. Her ashes were placed alongside those of Gérard Philipe in the cemetery of Ramatuelle in southern France.

=== Private life ===
In 1938, she married sinologist François Fourcade, adopting the name Nicole Fourcade. Their son, Alain, was born in 1939.

She met actor Gérard Philipe in 1942 in Nice. Following her return from China, she divorced François Fourcade and married Gérard Philipe on November 29, 1951. The couple had two children: Anne-Marie (born 1954) and Olivier (born 1956). Together, they purchased a house in Cergy in 1955 to distance themselves from Parisian social life. Philipe played a significant role in Gérard's career, advising him on role selections and encouraging his involvement with Jean Vilar's Théâtre National Populaire.
