= Jacques Hébertot =

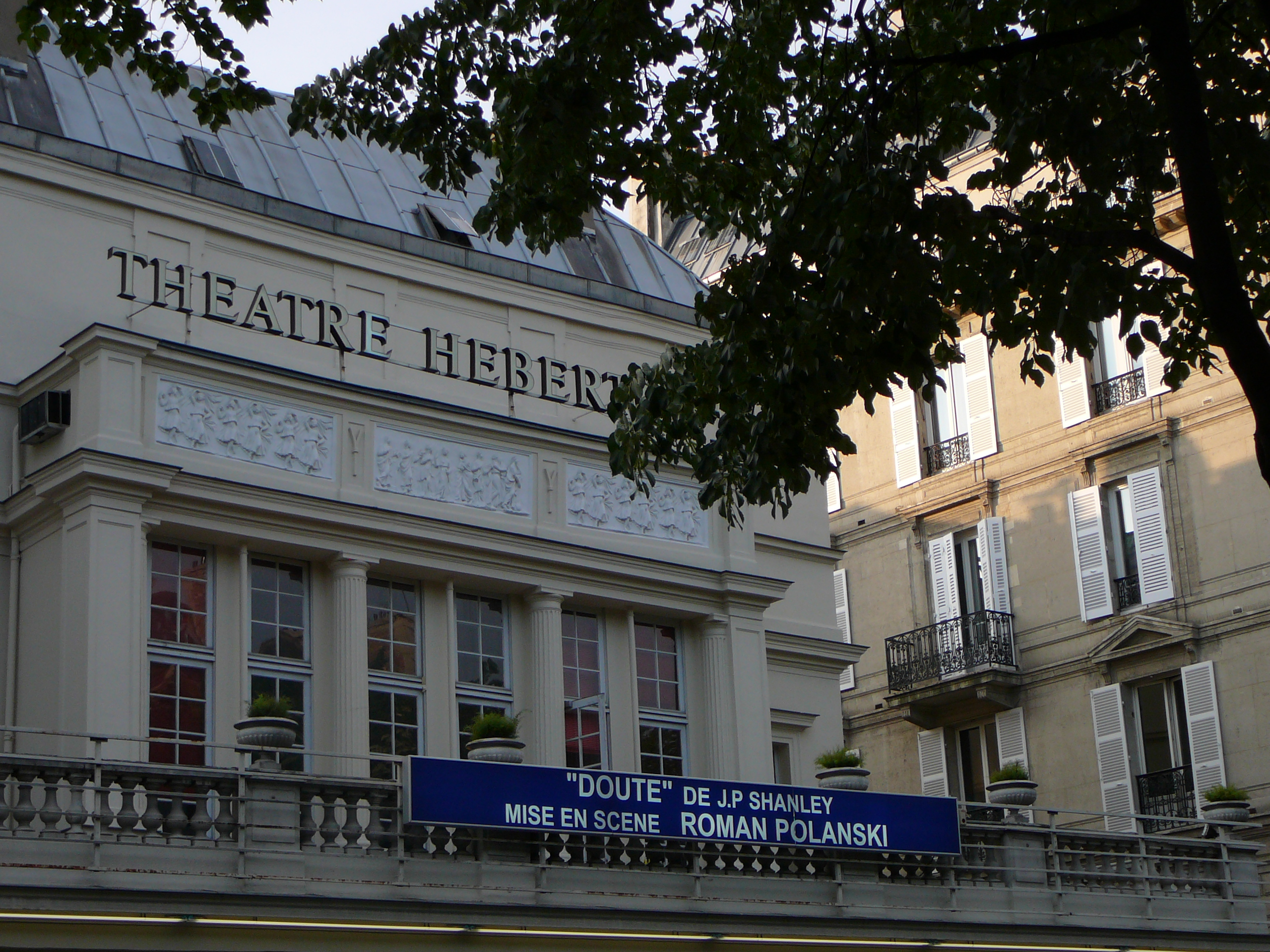
Théâtre Hébertot

Jacques Hébertot (French pronunciation: [ʒak ebɛʁto]; 28 January 1886, Rouen - 19 June 1970, Paris) was the pseudonym of André Daviel. He was a French theater director, poet, journalist and publisher. The Théâtre Hébertot in Paris has been named after him since 1940.

== Early life ==
The family of André Daviel counted among his ancestors the Jacques Daviel, a doctor, known not only for having been the friend of Denis Diderot, but also for being the surgeon of King Louis XV, and for having performed the first extracapsular cataract extraction; another ancestor was Alfred Daviel, lawyer and magistrate, Minister of Justice in 1851, senator of the Empire, first honorary president of the Court of Appeal of Rouen, specialist of Norman customary law.

The young André Daviel was born in Rouen and studied at the Catholic college Join-Lambert in the same city, and then in various colleges in Paris.

== Career ==
Resolutely anti-conformist, Jacques Hébertot frequented the theaters of Paris and mingled with young people of the artistic circles and the poets of the time. His artistic and literary ambitions worried his father who feared for the good name of the family. This is why, in 1903, when he was 17 years old, André Daviel changed his name to Jacques Hébertot; Jacques for his ancestor, Jacques Daviel, and Hébertot, because he liked the name of this small village close to the family property located in the hamlet of Beaumoucel a short distance from Beuzeville.

He received his first successes with Ballade for the purchase of the house of Pierre Corneille which was awarded by the Revue Picarde et Normande. During this period he wrote several plays, was the editor-in-chief of La Revue Mauve, founded the magazine L'Âme Normande, published Poèmes de mon pays, and founded the "Théâtre d'Art Régional Normand".

In 1909, at 19 years old, he became a member of the Société des Auteurs. After his military service in 1911, he was engaged as a dramatic critic by the magazine Gil Blas. In 1912, he gave lectures on Scandinavian dance at the Alliance Française. From now on he was linked to the avant-garde artistic movement, and he frequented the dîners de Passy where he met his young friend Guillaume Apollinaire, as well as Max Jacob, Oscar Milosz, Erik Satie, Igor Stravinsky, and Fernand Léger.

While he was a journalist with Gil Blas, he was forcibly enlisted in August 1914 in the World War I. He was assigned to the 81st Heavy Artillery Regiment, Group 5, and became Field Marshal. He fought on the Somme, Champagne and Verdun. His courage under fire made him to be quoted in the order of the regiment on 15 September 1917. Registered under number 012195, he was decorated with the Croix de Guerre. Throughout his period on the front he wrote his notebooks, various notes, articles for the newspaper Le Matin, political reflections, poems, and a description of the horrors of war.

In 1919 he was responsible for the literary and theatrical tour organized in Scandinavia on behalf of the Ministry of Foreign Affairs. Thanks to Nils Dardel, whom he had known for several years already, he met the mecenate Rolf de Maré and his companion, the dancer Jean Börlin. This meeting was the occasion for the birth of the idea of the future Scandinavian Ballets, which will later become the Ballets suédois. Rolf de Maré, who was an admiror of the Ballets Russes, and was eager to launch a new troop, felt that Jacques Hébertot was the man of the situation. He proposed him to try a solo presentation of Jean Börlin in Paris. Jacques Hébertot rented the Théâtre des Champs-Élysées for three evenings, from 25 to 27 March 1920, and engaged an orchestra of 45 musicians under the direction of Désiré-Émile Inghelbrecht. Without any decoration, Jean Börlin danced several compositions, in particular Danse céleste inspired by Siam and the Negro Sculpture inspired by the Cubist movement where the dancer transforms into an African statue. It was a great success for Börlin who was unanimously hailed. Rolf de Maré, convinced, decided to entrust Jacques Hébertot to find in Paris a bigger venue to present the Ballets suédois.

After attempting to sign the Paris Opera and the Théâtre Sarah Bernhardt (now Théâtre de la Ville) on 1 August 1920, Jacques Hébertot signed the lease contract for the entire Théâtre des Champs-Élysées. The theater was to become the Parisian base of the Ballets suédois, while Rolf de Maré managed the world tours. Jacques Hébertot continued to animate the Parisian theater, now under his responsibility. The Théâtre des Champs-Élysées became an important artistic center, particularly in the theatrical and musical fields, bringing together high-quality personalities: theatre directors like Georges Pitoëff and Ludmilla Pitoëff, Louis Jouvet and Gaston Baty, authors like Jean Cocteau, Paul Claudel, Blaise Cendrars, Francis Picabia, Anton Chekhov, Jules Romains, and Luigi Pirandello, composers like Francis Poulenc, Darius Milhaud, Georges Auric, Germaine Tailleferre and Erik Satie. In the field of painting, the Montaigne Gallery hosted the first exhibition of Amedeo Modigliani and the first Dada events.

At the same time, he created the periodicals Théâtre et Comœdia illustré, Paris-Journal, La Danse, Monsieur (with the collaboration of Louis Aragon, Georges Charensol and René Clair).

Following financial problems Jacques Hébertot left the Théâtre des Champs-Élysées in 1925, abandoned the direction of the Comédie à Louis Jouvet, gave the direction of the Studio to Gaston Baty, and quarreled with Rolf de Maré. He created a record business and recorded, among others, the first records of Petits Chanteurs à la croix de bois. In 1938 he joined his friends Georges and Ludmilla Pitoëff at the Théâtre des Mathurins, and produced Sei personaggi in cerca di autore by Pirandella and Création de un ennemi du peuple by Henrik Ibsen.

In 1938 his friend Paulette Pax, having health issues, proposed him to support her in the direction of the Théâtre de l'Œuvre. He took over the lease of the theater in 1942, after having declared: "I will resume the continuation of the efforts of my predecessors. I give the assurance that the work will remain an exceptional scene. The work will be a theater of research and experience, in a way, the theater of tomorrow."

After producing a number of shows, most of which were retained, the creation of a play by Pierre Brasseur and his desire to devote himself to the theater which now bears his name, pushed him to sold the lease of the Théâtre de l'Oeuvre in 1944 to Raymond Roll.

In 1940, Hébertot took over the direction of the Théâtre des Arts, an old Batignolles theater, built in 1838, and renamed it Théâtre Hébertot. There he produced his creations, attracting the greatest authors and the greatest comedians.

== Later life ==
In July 1952, in parallel with his theatrical activity, he became the owner of the spa resort of Forges-les-Eaux, in his native Normandy. The resort had been badly damaged by four years of occupation during World War II. His intent was to create a regional artistic center and to open a sort of international academy: "We will go from the Opera to the mystical drama. We will play Claudel as well as Meyerbeer, Beethoven and Strauss. Classical and modern."

Jacques Hébertot wanted to carry out a project that was close to his heart as he was a relative of one of the Carmélites de Compiègne guillotined during the Revolution: he bought the abandoned facade of the convent of the Carmelites of Gisors, disassembled it stone by stone and then built it up again close to the casino at Forges-les-Eaux, along the road that led to Dieppe. The facade is still there today even if, in 1959, due to a lack of resources, Hébertot had to renounce to his costly and ambitious undertaking.

In spring 1957, Hébertot founded a national weekly magazine Artaban ("Because we are proud!") devoted to the arts in general. Despite the anxieties of his friends Albert Camus and Maurice Clavel, he embarked on an expensive adventure that will not go beyond the autumn of 1958 but that will leave interesting archives. Shortly before his death, he told Diego Fabbri, in an interview published in the program of the spectacle Bienheureux les violents, that "with the theater, it was poetry that had been essential to his life."

He died on 19 June 1970. Bertrand Poirot-Delpech wrote in Le Monde, on 21 June 1970: "The death of the master has the effect of a very old tree that falls to the bottom of a family park. This time, it is there, the theater of the elite no longer exists".

He is buried in the monumental cemetery of Rouen in the cellar of the Family Pinel which was that of his mother.

== Legacy ==
The central part of the Boulevard des Batignolles (8th and 17th arrondissements), opposite the Théâtre Hébertot, has been called promenade Jacques Hébertot since 16 January 2014. The Paris Council unanimously voted this decision at the deliberation on 4 October 2011.

The Bibliothèque historique de la ville de Paris maintains a "Jacques Hébertot" fonds, which includes programs, posters, war books, items from his personal library, objects and a portion of the Hébertot Theater books. This collection was entered thanks to the Association de la Régie Théâtrale, following a donation from Serge Bouillon, manager of the Société Immobilière Batignolles-Monceau (owner of the Théâtre Hébertot's walls). Since the death of Serge Bouillon, on 31 July 2014, his wife, Danielle Mathieu-Bouillon, President of the Association of the Théâtre Régie, became the beneficiary of Jacques Hébertot.
