= Jacques Sigurd =

French screenwriter

Jacques Sigurd (15 June 1920, Paris – 21 December 1987, New York City) was a French screenwriter.

== Selected filmography ==
- Una playa tan bonita (1949)
- All Roads Lead to Rome (1949)
- Miracles Only Happen Once (1951)
- Leathernose (1952)
- Desperate Decision (1952)
- Rhine Virgin (1953)
- The Lovers of Midnight (1953)
- The Lovers of Manon Lescaut (1954)
- The Beautiful Otero (1954)
- The Air of Paris (1954)
- White Cargo (1958)
- The Second Twin (1966)
