= Yves Allégret =

French film director (1905–1987)

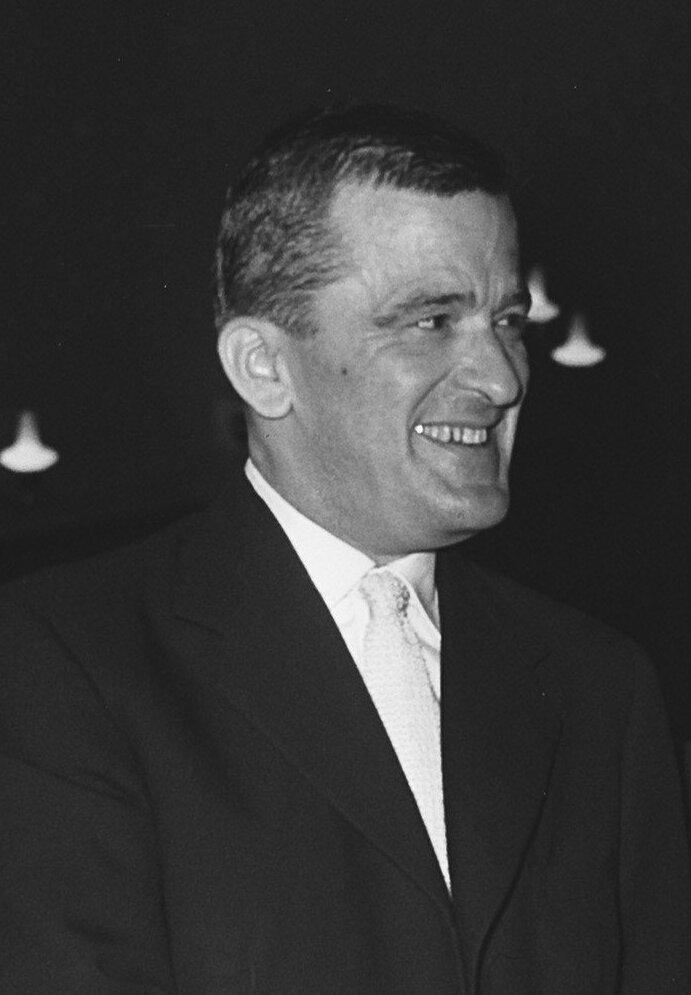
- Allégret (1955)
- Born: 13 October 1905; Asnières-sur-Seine, Hauts-de-Seine, France
- Died: 31 January 1987 (aged 81); Jouars-Pontchartrain, France
- Occupation: Film director
- Spouse: Simone Signoret (m. 1944; div. 1949)
- Father: Élie Allégret
- Family: Marc Allégret (brother); Catherine Allégret (daughter)

Yves Allégret (French: [iv aleɡʁɛ]; 13 October 1905 – 31 January 1987) was a French film director, often working in the film noir genre. He was born in Asnières-sur-Seine, Hauts-de-Seine and died in Paris.

He was an assistant to film directors such as his brother Marc Allégret, Augusto Genina, and Jean Renoir.

== Filmography ==
=== Feature films ===
- The Tamer (1938)
- Tobias Is an Angel (1940)
- The Emigrant (dir. Léo Joannon, 1940)
- Box of Dreams (1945)
- Dawn Devils (1946)
- Dédée d'Anvers (1948)
- Une si jolie petite plage (1949)
- Manèges (1950)
- Miracles Only Happen Once (1951)
- Leathernose (1952)
- Desperate Decision (1952)
- The Proud and the Beautiful (1953)
- Oh No, Mam'zelle (1954)
- Oasis (1955)
- The Best Part (1956)
- Young Girls Beware (1957)
- Send a Woman When the Devil Fails (1957)
- The Daughter of Hamburg (1958)
- The Restless and the Damned (1959)
- Jack of Spades (1960)
- Konga Yo (1962)
- Germinal (1963)
- Johnny Banco (1967)
- Invasion (1970)
- Mords pas, on t'aime (1976)

=== TV series ===
- Orzowei (1977)
