= List of Big Three film festivals winners =

This list holds these three most prestigious film festivals in Europe, collectively known as the Big Three:

- Venice Film Festival – held in Venice, a city in Veneto, Italy; from 1932.
- Cannes Film Festival – held in Cannes, a city in Provence-Alpes-Côte d'Azur, France; from 1939.
- Berlin International Film Festival – held in Berlin, Germany; from 1951.

== Top prizes ==
As of 2026, only five filmmakers have won the Golden Lion, Palme d'Or and Golden Bear.

- Jean-Luc Godard was given a Special Palme d'Or as an homage to his career. The other prizes on this list were all competitive prizes.
- Henri-Georges Clouzot got two prizes on this list for a single film. The other prizes on this list are all for different films.

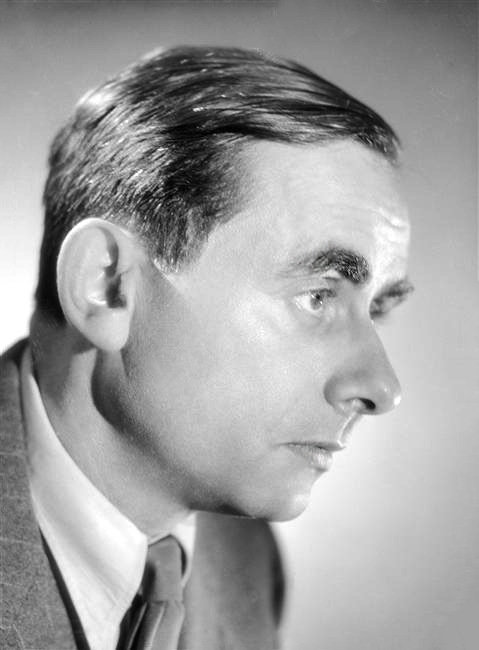
Georges Clouzot, completed in 1953.

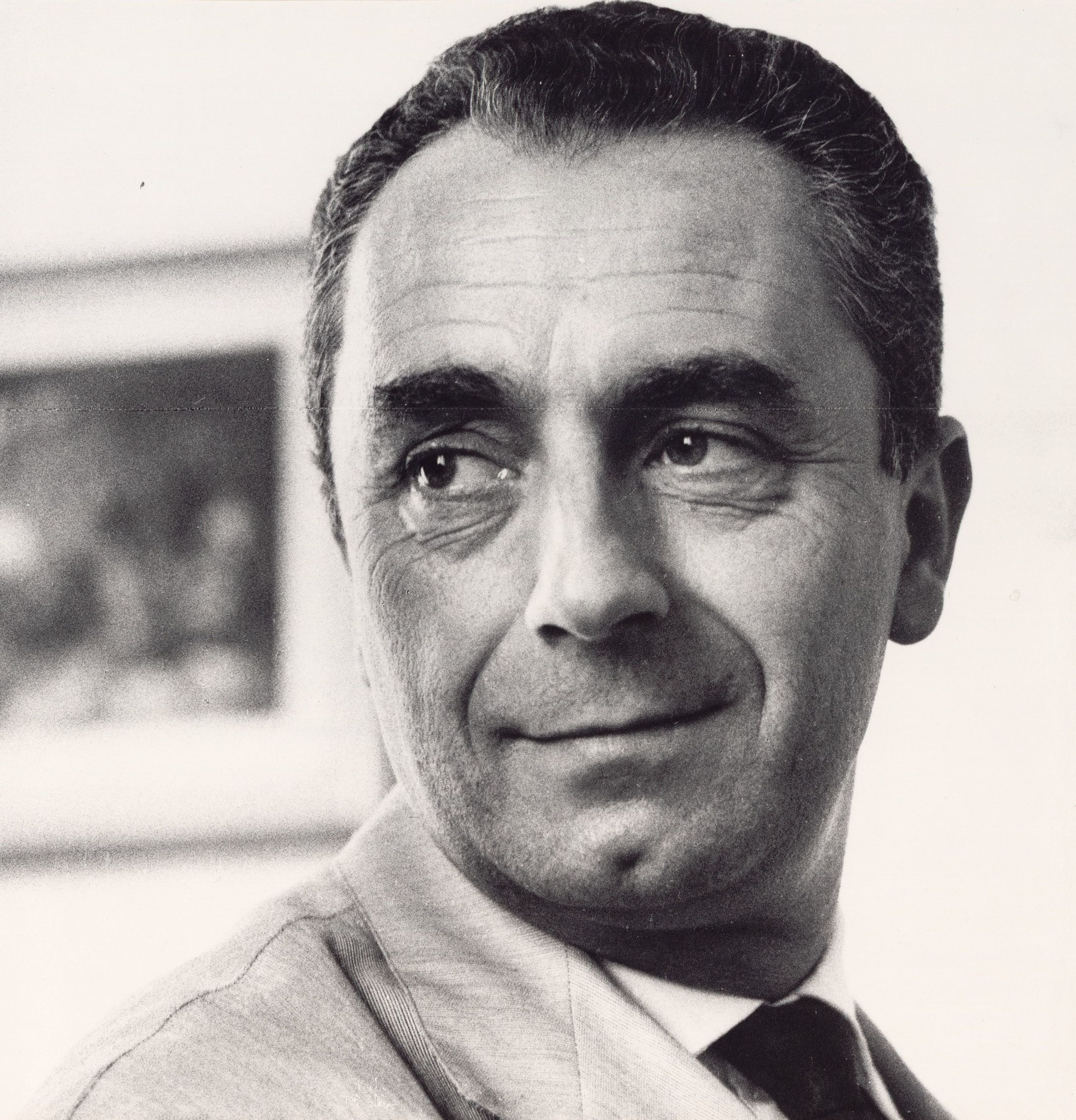
Antonioni, completed in 1967.

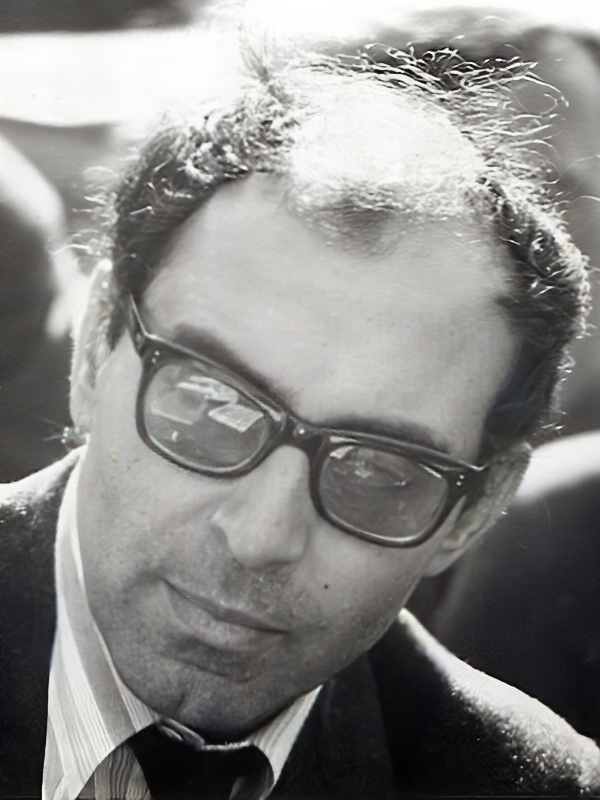
Godard, completed in 2018; the longest gap between first and last prizes he received in 53 years.

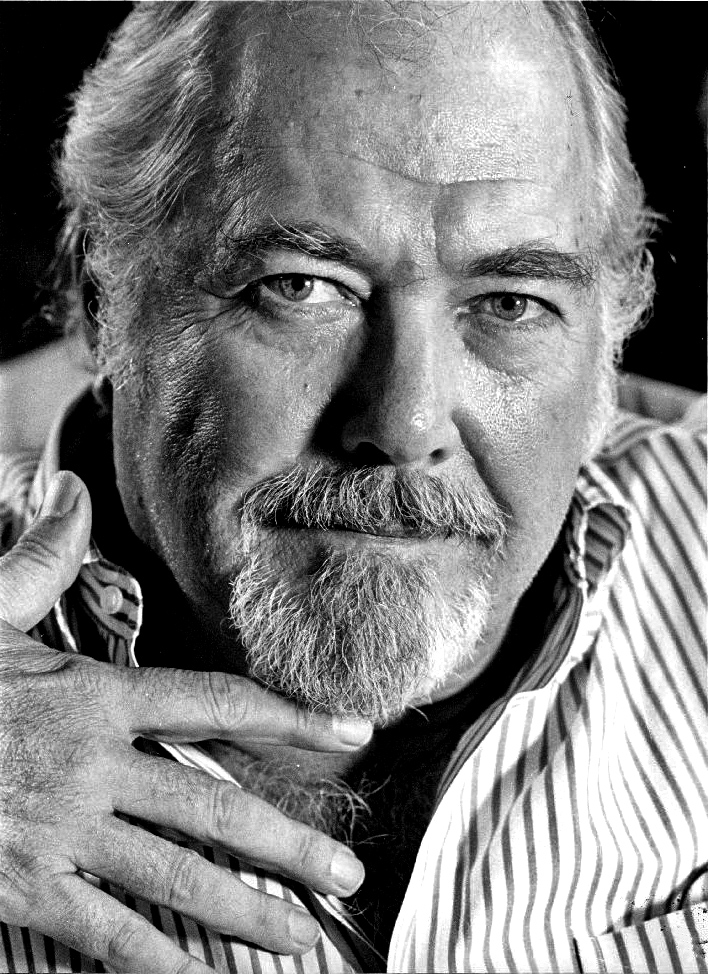
Altman, completed in 1993.

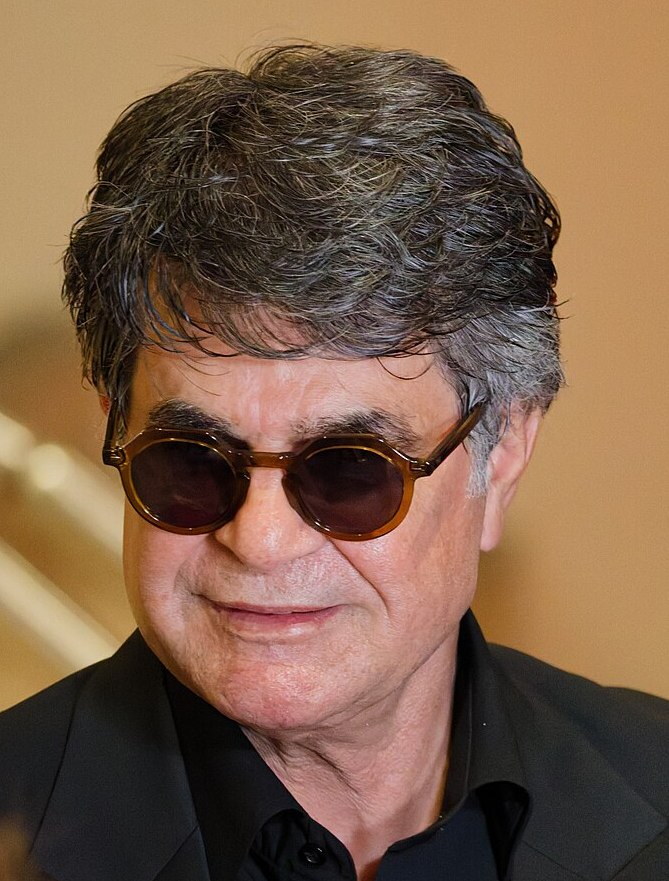
Panahi, completed in 2025.

Name	Golden Lion	Year Awarded	Palme d'Or	Year Awarded	Golden Bear	Year Awarded	Year Completed
(France) Henri-Georges Clouzot	Manon	1949	The Wages of Fear	1953	The Wages of Fear	1953	1949–1953 (4 years)
(Italy) Michelangelo Antonioni (Note: Also won the Golden Leopard)	Red Desert	1964	Blowup	1967	La Notte	1961	1961–1967 (6 years)
(France) Jean-Luc Godard	First Name: Carmen	1983	The Image Book (Note: Awarded as Special Palme d'Or)	2018	Alphaville	1965	1965–2018 (53 years)
(United States) Robert Altman	Short Cuts	1993	M*A*S*H	1970	Buffalo Bill and the Indians, or Sitting Bull's History Lesson	1976	1970–1993 (23 years)
(Iran) Jafar Panâhi	The Circle	2000	It Was Just an Accident	2025	Taxi	2015	2000–2025 (25 years)

=== Two prizes ===
Filmmakers who have won two out of three:

- (Austria) (Switzerland) Leopold Lindtberg (1946–1951; 5 years)
  - The Last Chance – Palme d'Or (1946)
  - Four in a Jeep – Golden Bear (1951)
- (United Kingdom) David Lean (1946–1954; 8 years)
  - Brief Encounter – Palme d'Or (1946)
  - Hobson's Choice – Golden Bear (1954)
- (Italy) Roberto Rossellini (1946–1959; 13 years)
  - Rome, Open City – Palme d'Or (1946)
  - General Della Rovere – Golden Lion (1959)
- (France) René Clément (1947–1952; 5 years)
  - The Damned – Palme d'Or (1947)
  - Forbidden Games – Golden Lion (1952)
- (France) André Cayatte (1951–1960; 9 years)
  - Justice Is Done – Golden Bear (1951)
  - Tomorrow Is My Turn – Golden Lion (1960)
- (Italy) Vittorio De Sica (1951–1971; 20 years)
  - Miracle in Milan – Palme d'Or (1951)
  - The Garden of the Finzi-Continis – Golden Bear (1971)
- (Japan) Akira Kurosawa (1951–1980; 29 years)
  - Rashomon – Golden Lion (1951)
  - Kagemusha – Palme d'Or (1980)
- (Italy) Renato Castellani (1952–1954; 2 years)
  - Two Cents Worth of Hope – Palme d'Or (1952)
  - Romeo and Juliet – Golden Lion (1954)
- (France) Louis Malle (1956–1980; 24 years)
  - The Silent World – Palme d'Or (1956)
  - Atlantic City (1980) and Goodbye, Children (1987) – Golden Lion
- (India) Satyajit Ray (1957–1973; 16 years)
  - Aparajito – Golden Lion (1957)
  - Ashani Sanket – Golden Bear (1973)
- (Mexico) (Spain) Luis Buñuel (1961–1967; 6 years)
  - Viridiana – Palme d'Or (1961)
  - Belle de Jour – Golden Lion (1967)
- (Italy) Luchino Visconti (1963–1965; 2 years)
  - The Leopard – Palme d'Or (1963)
  - Sandra – Golden Lion (1965)
- (Italy) Francesco Rosi (1963–1972; 9 years)
  - Hands over the City – Golden Lion (1963)
  - The Mattei Affair – Palme d'Or (1972)
- (France) (Poland) Roman Polanski (1966–2002; 36 years)
  - Cul-de-sac – Golden Bear (1966)
  - The Pianist – Palme d'Or (2002)
- (Italy) Vittorio Taviani and Paolo Taviani (1977–2012; 35 years)
  - Padre Padrone – Palme d'Or (1977)
  - Caesar Must Die – Golden Bear (2012)
- (Italy) Ermanno Olmi (1978–1988; 10 years)
  - The Tree of Wooden Clogs – Palme d'Or (1978)
  - The Legend of the Holy Drinker – Golden Lion (1988)
- (United States) John Cassavetes (1980–1984; 4 years)
  - Gloria – Golden Lion (1980)
  - Love Streams – Golden Bear (1984)
- (Germany) Wim Wenders (1982–1984; 2 years)
  - The State of Things – Golden Lion (1982)
  - Paris, Texas – Palme d'Or (1984)
- (France) (Greece) Costa-Gavras (1982–1989; 7 years)
  - Missing – Palme d'Or (1982)
  - Music Box – Golden Bear (1989)
- (China) Zhang Yimou (1988–1992; 4 years)
  - Red Sorghum – Golden Bear (1988)
  - The Story of Qiu Ju (1992) and Not One Less (1999) – Golden Lion
- (Taiwan) Ang Lee (1993–2005; 12 years)
  - The Wedding Banquet (1993) and Sense and Sensibility (1995) – Golden Bear
  - Brokeback Mountain (2005) and Lust, Caution (2007) – Golden Lion
- (United Kingdom) Mike Leigh (1996–2004; 8 years)
  - Secrets & Lies – Palme d'Or (1996)
  - Vera Drake – Golden Lion (2004)
- (United States) Terrence Malick (1999–2011; 12 years)
  - The Thin Red Line – Golden Bear (1999)
  - The Tree of Life – Palme d'Or (2011)
- (Italy) (United States) Gianfranco Rosi (2013–2016; 3 years)
  - Sacro GRA – Golden Lion (2013)
  - Fire at Sea – Golden Bear (2016)

== Runner-up prizes ==
Each second place or runner-up winners consist Venice's Grand Jury Prize, Cannes's Grand Prix and Berlin's Silver Bear Grand Jury Prize. As of 2026, Pier Paolo Pasolini is the only filmmaker to have won all the prizes.

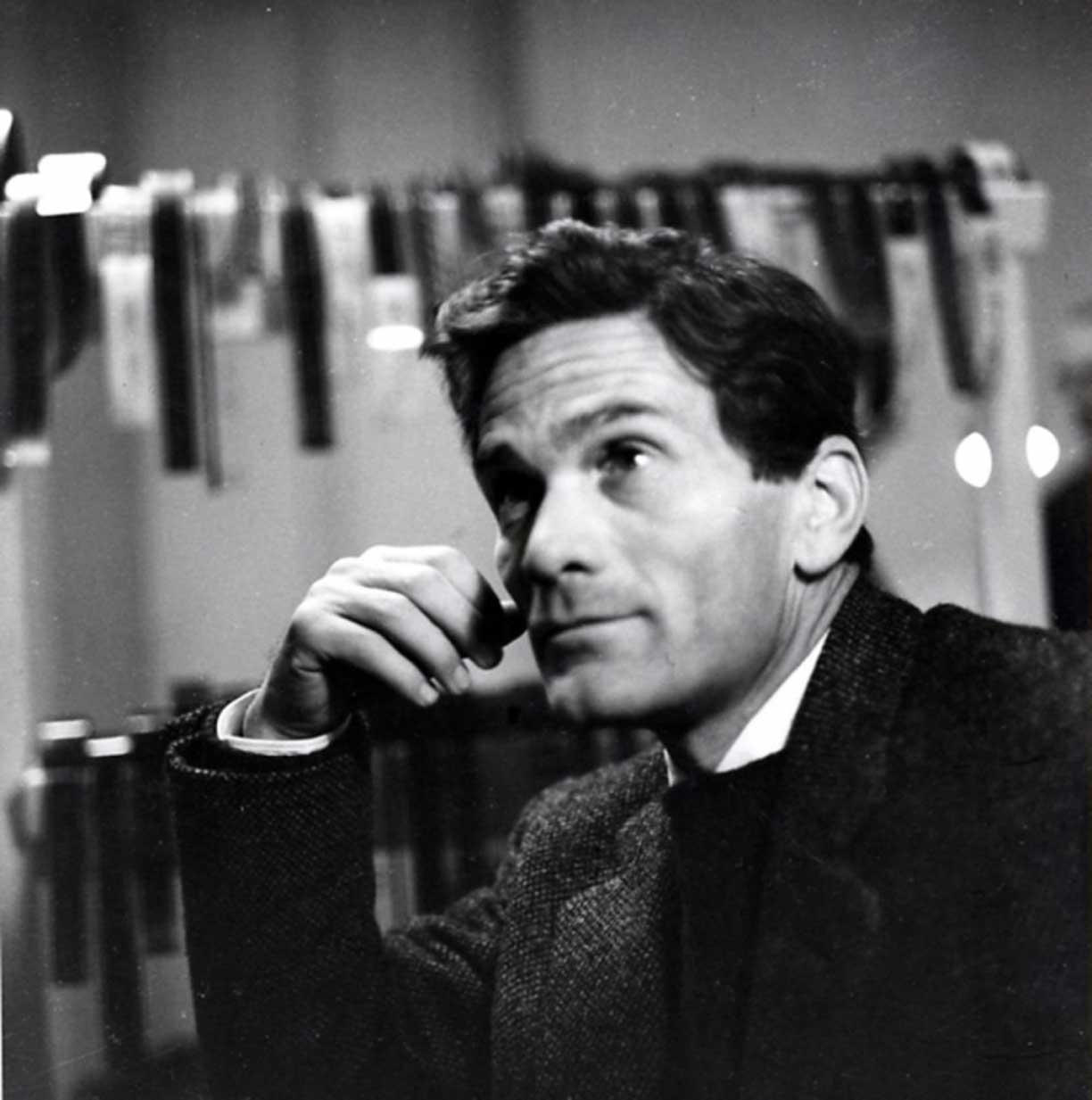
Pasolini, completed in 1974.

Name	Grand Jury Prize of Venice Film Festival	Year Awarded	Grand Prix	Year Awarded	Silver Bear Grand Jury Prize	Year Awarded	Year Completed
(Italy) Pier Paolo Pasolini	The Gospel According to St. Matthew	1964	Arabian Nights	1974	Il Decameron	1971	1964–1974 (10 years)

=== Two prizes ===
Filmmakers who have won two out of three:

- (France) (Poland) Roman Polanski (1965–2019; 54 years)
  - Repulsion – Silver Bear Grand Jury Prize (1965)
  - An Officer and a Spy – Venice Film Festival for Grand Jury Prize (2019)
- (France) Éric Rohmer (1967–1976; 9 years)
  - La Collectionneuse – Silver Bear Grand Jury Prize (1967)
  - The Marquise of O – Grand Prix (1976)
- (Italy) Marco Bellocchio (1967–1991; 24 years)
  - China Is Near – Venice Film Festival for Grand Jury Prize (1967)
  - The Conviction – Silver Bear Grand Jury Prize (1991)
- (Germany) Werner Herzog (1968–1975; 7 years)
  - Signs of Life – Silver Bear Grand Jury Prize (1968)
  - The Enigma of Kaspar Hauser – Grand Prix (1975)
- (Italy) Marco Ferreri (1978–1980; 2 years)
  - Bye Bye Monkey – Grand Prix (1978)
  - Seeking Asylum – Silver Bear Grand Jury Prize (1980)
- (Poland) Jerzy Skolimowski (1978–2010; 32 years)
  - The Shout – Grand Prix (1978)
  - Essential Killing – Venice Film Festival for Grand Jury Prize (2010)
- (Russia) Andrei Konchalovsky (1979–2002; 23 years)
  - Siberiade – Grand Prix (1979)
  - House of Fools – Venice Film Festival for Grand Jury Prize (2002)
- (Italy) Nanni Moretti (1981–1986; 5 years)
  - Sweet Dreams – Venice Film Festival for Grand Jury Prize (1981)
  - The Mass Is Ended – Silver Bear Grand Jury Prize (1986)
- (Italy) Giuseppe Tornatore (1989–1995; 6 years)
  - Cinema Paradiso – Grand Prix (1989)
  - The Star Maker – Venice Film Festival for Grand Jury Prize (1995)
- (China) Zhang Yimou (1994–2000; 6 years)
  - To Live – Grand Prix (1994)
  - The Road Home – Silver Bear Grand Jury Prize (2000)
- (Malaysia) (Taiwan) Tsai Ming-liang (1997–2013; 16 years)
  - The River – Silver Bear Grand Jury Prize (1997)
  - Stray Dogs – Venice Film Festival for Grand Jury Prize (2013)
- (Japan) Ryusuke Hamaguchi (2021–2023; 2 years)
  - Wheel of Fortune and Fantasy – Silver Bear Grand Jury Prize (2021)
  - Evil Does Not Exist – Venice Film Festival for Grand Jury Prize (2023)

== Directing prizes ==
Each directorial winners consist Venice's Silver Lion for Best Direction, Cannes's Award for Best Director and Berlin's Silver Bear for Best Director. As of 2026, American filmmaker Paul Thomas Anderson is the only person to have won all the prizes.

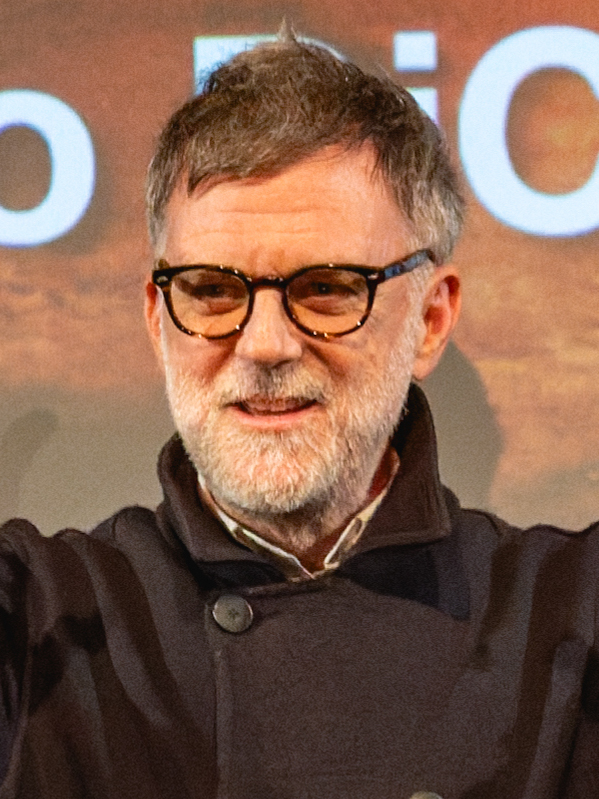
Anderson, completed in 2012.

Name	Silver Lion for Best Direction	Year Awarded	Cannes Film Festival Award for Best Director	Year Awarded	Silver Bear for Best Director	Year Awarded	Year Completed
(United States) Paul Thomas Anderson	The Master	2012	Punch-Drunk Love	2002	There Will Be Blood	2008	2002–2012 (10 years)

=== Two prizes ===
Filmmakers who have won two out of three as director:

- (Japan) Akira Kurosawa (1954–1959; 5 years)
  - Seven Samurai – Silver Lion for Best Direction (1954)
  - The Hidden Fortress – Silver Bear for Best Director (1959)
- (United States) Robert Aldrich (1955–1956; 1 year)
  - The Big Knife – Silver Lion for Best Direction (1955)
  - Autumn Leaves – Silver Bear for Best Director (1956)
- (Italy) Ettore Scola (1976–1984; 8 years)
  - Down and Dirty – Cannes Film Festival Award for Best Director (1976)
  - Le Bal – Silver Bear for Best Director (1984)
- (United States) Martin Scorsese (1986–1990; 4 years)
  - After Hours – Cannes Film Festival Award for Best Director (1986)
  - Goodfellas – Silver Lion for Best Direction (1990)
- (Serbia) (Socialist Federal Republic of Yugoslavia) Emir Kusturica (1989–1998; 9 years)
  - Time of the Gypsies – Cannes Film Festival Award for Best Director (1989)
  - Black Cat, White Cat – Silver Lion for Best Direction (1998)
- (France) Philippe Garrel (1991–2023; 32 years)
  - J'entends plus la guitare (1991) and Regular Lovers (2005) – Silver Lion for Best Direction
  - The Plough – Silver Bear for Best Director (2023)
- (South Korea) Kim Ki-duk (2004)
  - 3-Iron – Silver Lion for Best Direction (2004)
  - Samaritan Girl – Silver Bear for Best Director (2004)
- (Spain) (Mexico) Amat Escalante (2013–2016; 3 years)
  - Heli – Cannes Film Festival Award for Best Director (2013)
  - The Untamed – Silver Lion for Best Direction (2016)

== Screenplay prizes ==
As of 2026, no one has won all three festivals' screenplay prizes yet. However, screenwriters who have won two out of three prizes are listed below.

- (Iran) Jafar Panahi (2013–2018; 5 years)
  - Closed Curtain – Silver Bear for Best Screenplay (2013)
  - 3 Faces – Cannes Film Festival Award for Best Screenplay (2018)

== Acting prizes ==
As of 2026, only four actors have won all three film festivals' acting prizes as for their performances as a lead.

=== Male ===
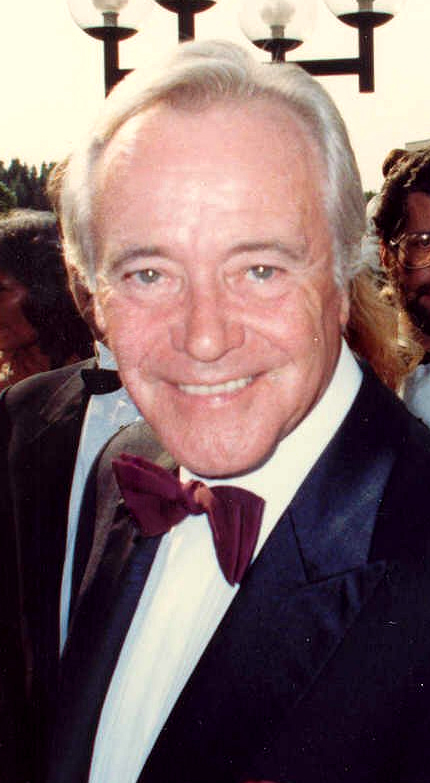
Lemmon, completed in 1992.

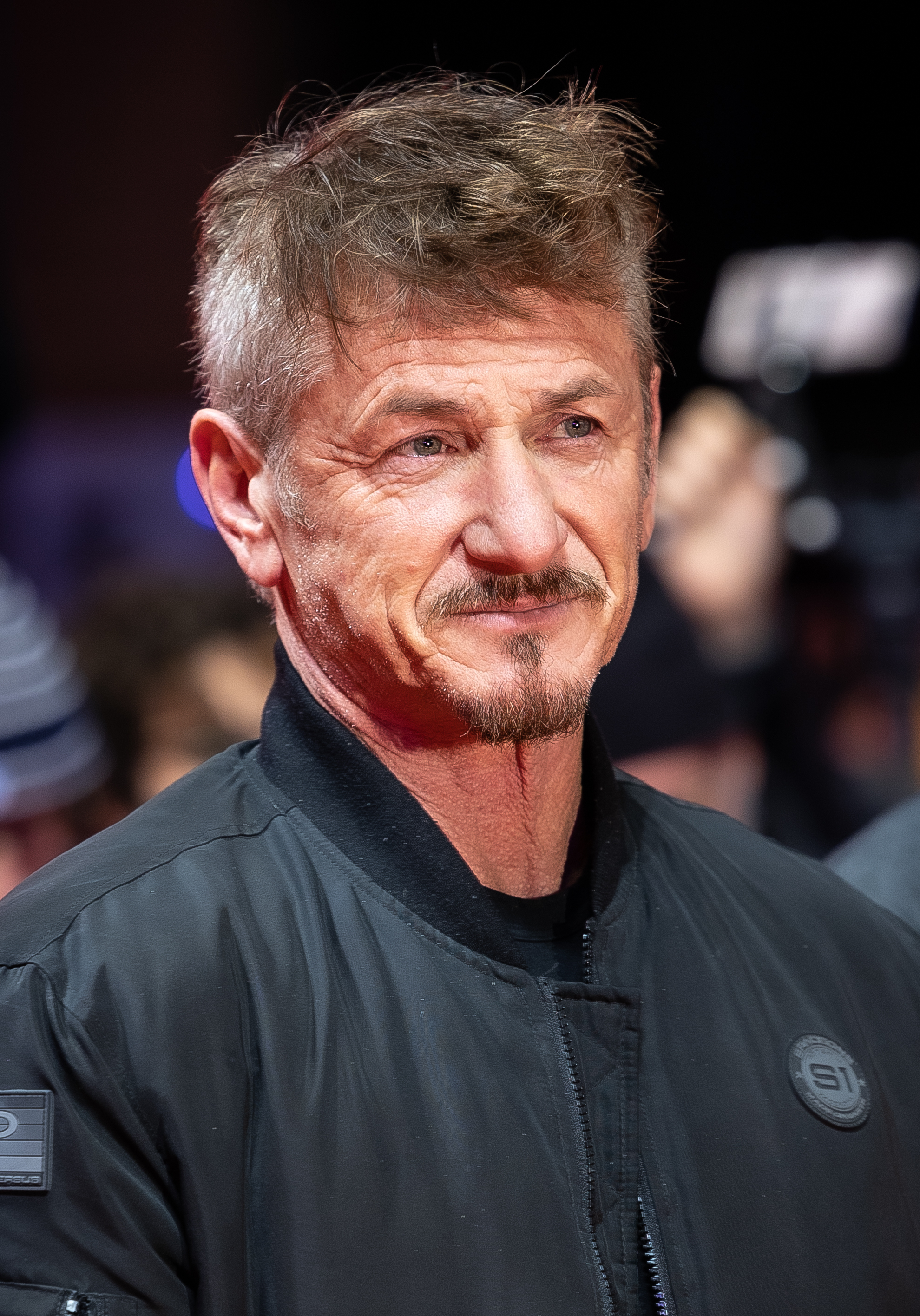
Penn, completed in 1998.

Name	Venice	Year Awarded	Cannes	Year Awarded	Berlin (Note: Starting with the 71st Berlin International Film Festival in 2021, the Best Actor and Best Actress awards have been replaced with two gender-neutral Best Leading Performance and Best Supporting Performance categories.)	Year Awarded	Year Completed
(United States) Jack Lemmon	Glengarry Glen Ross	1992	The China Syndrome; Missing	1979; 1982	Tribute	1981	1979–1992 (13 years)
(United States) Sean Penn	Hurlyburly; 21 Grams	1998; 2003	She's So Lovely	1997	Dead Man Walking	1996	1996–1998 (2 years)

Actors who have won two out of three for best acting performance as a lead:

- (United States) Frederic March (1932–1960; 28 years)
  - Dr. Jekyll and Mr. Hyde (1932) and Death of a Salesman (1952) – Volpi Cup for Best Actor
  - Inherit The Wind – Silver Bear for Best Actor (1960)
- (France) Jean Gabin (1951–1959; 8 years)
  - The Night Is My Kingdom (1951), The Air of Paris (1954) and Touchez pas au grisbi (1954) – Volpi Cup for Best Actor
  - Archimède le clochard (1959) and Le Chat (1971) – Silver Bear for Best Actor
- (United States) Burt Lancaster (1956–1962; 6 years)
  - Trapeze – Silver Bear for Best Actor (1956)
  - Birdman of Alcatraz – Volpi Cup for Best Actor (1962)
- (United States) Paul Newman (1958–1995; 37 years)
  - The Long, Hot Summer – Cannes Film Festival Award for Best Actor (1958)
  - Nobody's Fool – Silver Bear for Best Actor (1995)
- (United States) James Stewart (1959–1962; 3 years)
  - Anatomy of a Murder – Volpi Cup for Best Actor (1959)
  - Mr. Hobbs Takes a Vacation – Silver Bear for Best Actor (1962)
- (United Kingdom) Albert Finney (1963–1984; 21 years)
  - Tom Jones – Volpi Cup for Best Actor (1963)
  - The Dresser – Silver Bear for Best Actor (1984)
- (United Kingdom) Tom Courtenay (1964–2015; 51 years)
  - King & Country – Volpi Cup for Best Actor (1964)
  - 45 Years – Silver Bear for Best Actor (2015)
- (France) Jean-Louis Trintignant (1968–1969; 1 year)
  - The Man Who Lies – Silver Bear for Best Actor (1968)
  - Z – Cannes Film Festival Award for Best Actor (1969)
- (Italy) Marcello Mastroianni (1970–1989; 19 years)
  - The Pizza Triangle (1970) and Dark Eyes (1987) – Cannes Film Festival Award for Best Actor
  - What Time Is It? (1989) and 1, 2, 3, Sun (1993) – Volpi Cup for Best Actor
- (France) Michel Piccoli (1980–1982; 2 years)
  - A Leap in the Dark – Cannes Film Festival Award for Best Actor (1980)
  - Strange Affair – Silver Bear for Best Actor (1982)
- (Italy) Gian Maria Volonté (1983–1987; 4 years)
  - The Death of Mario Ricci – Cannes Film Festival Award for Best Actor (1983)
  - The Moro Affair – Silver Bear for Best Actor (1987)
- (United States) Bruce Dern (1983–2014; 31 years)
  - That Championship Season – Silver Bear for Best Actor (1983)
  - Nebraska – Cannes Film Festival Award for Best Actor (2014)
- (France) Gérard Depardieu (1985–1990; 5 years)
  - Police – Volpi Cup for Best Actor (1985)
  - Cyrano de Bergerac – Cannes Film Festival Award for Best Actor (1990)
- (United States) Samuel L. Jackson (1991–1998; 7 years)
  - Jungle Fever – Cannes Film Festival Award for Best Actor (1991)
  - Jackie Brown – Silver Bear for Best Actor (1998)
- (Spain) Javier Bardem (2000–2010; 10 years)
  - Before Night Falls (2000) and The Sea Inside (2004) – Volpi Cup for Best Actor
  - Biutiful – Cannes Film Festival Award for Best Actor (2010)
- (Puerto Rico) Benicio del Toro (2001–2008; 7 years)
  - Traffic – Silver Bear for Best Actor (2001)
  - Che – Cannes Film Festival Award for Best Actor (2008)
- (Italy) Elio Germano (2010–2020; 10 years)
  - La nostra vita – Cannes Film Festival Award for Best Actor (2010)
  - Hidden Away – Silver Bear for Best Actor (2020)
- (Iran) Shahab Hosseini (2011–2016; 5 years)
  - A Separation – Silver Bear for Best Actor (2011)
  - The Salesman – Cannes Film Festival Award for Best Actor (2016)
- (United States) Joaquin Phoenix (2012–2017; 5 years)
  - The Master – Volpi Cup for Best Actor (2012)
  - You Were Never Really Here – Cannes Film Festival Award for Best Actor (2017)
- (France) Vincent Lindon (2015–2024; 9 years)
  - The Measure of a Man – Cannes Film Festival Award for Best Actor (2015)
  - The Quiet Son – Volpi Cup for Best Actor (2024)

=== Female ===
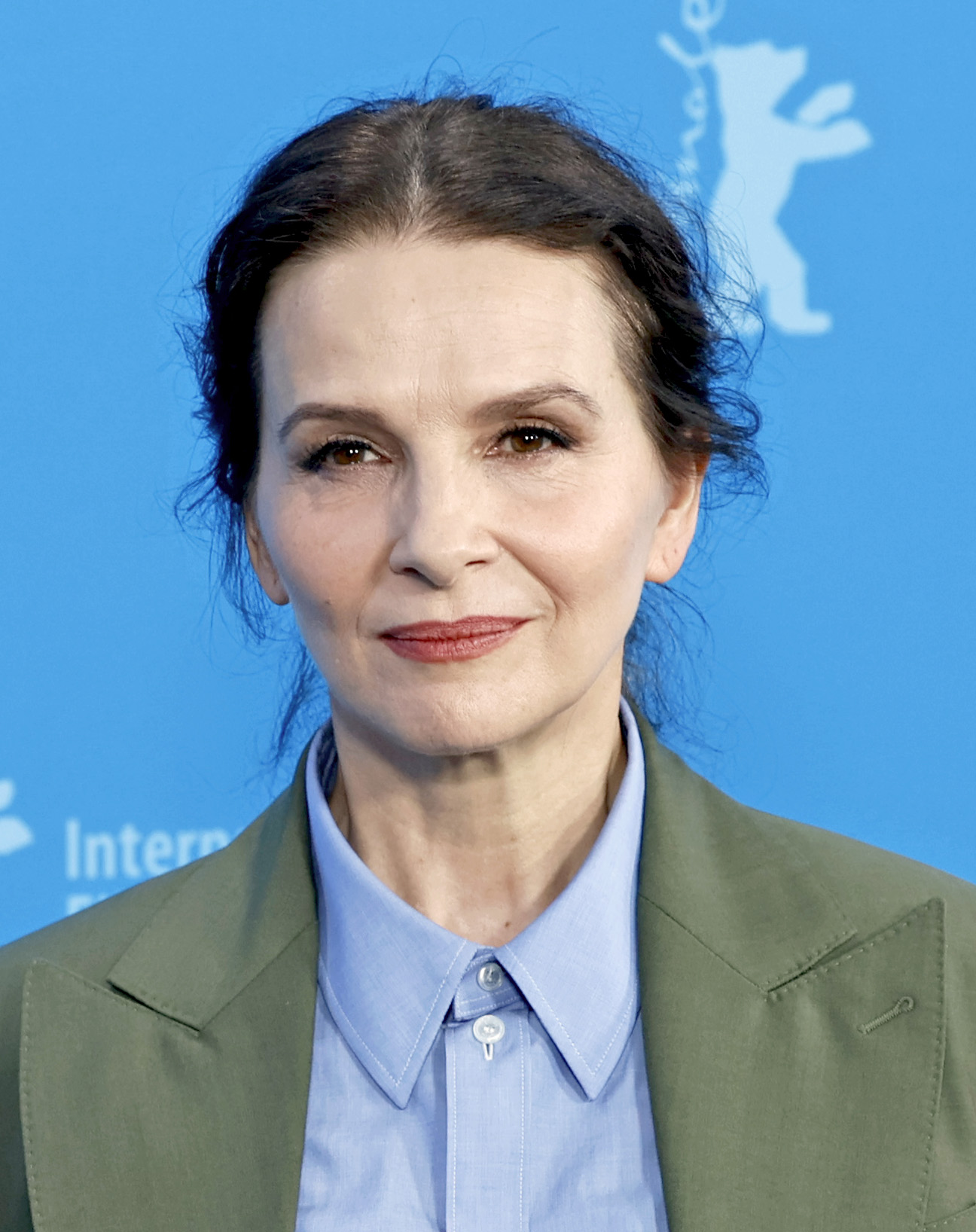
Binoche, completed in 2010.

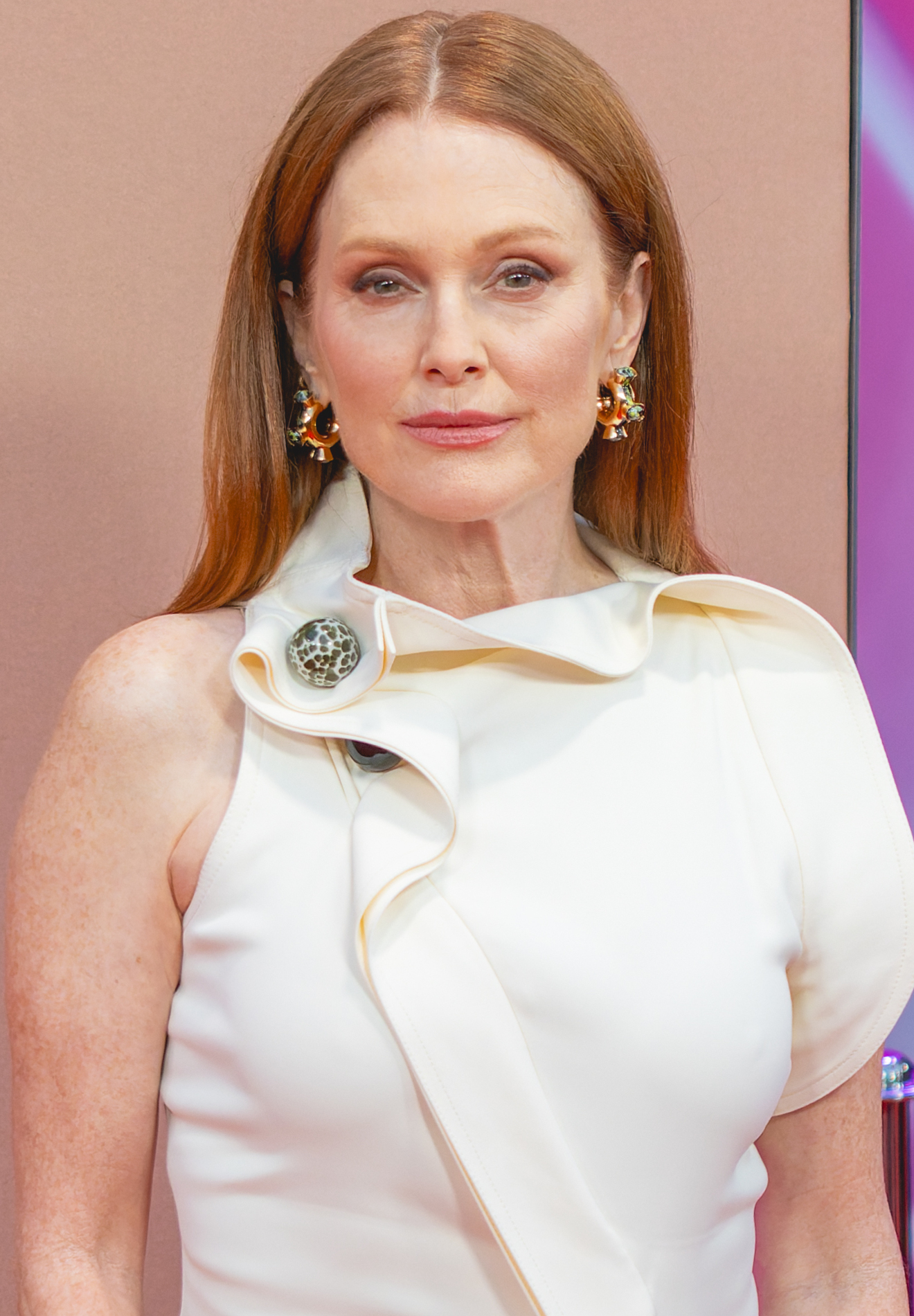
Moore, completed in 2014.

Name	Venice	Year Awarded	Cannes	Year Awarded	Berlin	Year Awarded	Year Completed
(France) Juliette Binoche	Three Colors: Blue	1993	Certified Copy	2010	The English Patient	1997	1993–2010 (17 years)
(United States) Julianne Moore	Far from Heaven	2002	Maps to the Stars	2014	The Hours	2003 (Note: Shared with Nicole Kidman and Meryl Streep)	2002–2014 (12 years)

Actresses who have won two out of three for best acting performance as a lead:

- (United States) Katharine Hepburn (1934–1962; 28 years)
  - Little Women – Volpi Cup for Best Actress (1934)
  - Long Day's Journey into Night – Cannes Film Festival Award for Best Actress (1962)
- (United States) Bette Davis (1937–1951; 14 years)
  - Marked Woman (1937) and Kid Galahad (1937) – Volpi Cup for Best Actress
  - All About Eve – Cannes Film Festival Award for Best Actress (1951)
- (Italy) Anna Magnani (1947–1958; 11 years)
  - Angelina – Volpi Cup for Best Actress (1947)
  - Wild Is the Wind – Silver Bear for Best Actress (1958)
- (Italy) Sophia Loren (1958–1961; 3 years)
  - The Black Orchid – Volpi Cup for Best Actress (1958)
  - Two Women – Cannes Film Festival Award for Best Actress (1961)
- (Sweden) Bibi Andersson (1958–1963; 5 years)
  - Brink of Life – Cannes Film Festival Award for Best Actress (1958)
  - The Mistress – Silver Bear for Best Actress (1963)
- (United States) Shirley MacLaine (1959–1960; 1 year)
  - Ask Any Girl (1959) and Desperate Characters (1971) – Silver Bear for Best Actress
  - The Apartment (1960) and Madame Sousatzka (1988) – Volpi Cup for Best Actress
- (France) Simone Signoret (1959–1971; 12 years)
  - Room at the Top – Cannes Film Festival Award for Best Actress (1959)
  - Le Chat – Silver Bear for Best Actress (1971)
- (United Kingdom) Vanessa Redgrave (1966–1994; 28 years)
  - Morgan – A Suitable Case for Treatment (1966) and Isadora (1969) – Cannes Film Festival Award for Best Actress
  - Little Odessa – Volpi Cup for Best Actress (1994)
- (France) Isabelle Huppert (1978–1988; 10 years)
  - Violette Nozière (1978) and The Piano Teacher (2001) – Cannes Film Festival Award for Best Actress
  - Story of Women (1988) and La Cérémonie (1995) – Volpi Cup for Best Actress
- (Germany) Hanna Schygulla (1979–1983; 4 years)
  - The Marriage of Maria Braun – Silver Bear for Best Actress (1979)
  - The Story of Piera – Cannes Film Festival Award for Best Actress (1983)
- (Germany) Barbara Sukowa (1981–1986; 5 years)
  - Marianne and Juliane – Volpi Cup for Best Actress (1981)
  - Rosa Luxemburg – Cannes Film Festival Award for Best Actress (1986)
- (France) Isabelle Adjani (1981–1989; 8 years)
  - Possession (1981) and Quartet (1981) – Cannes Film Festival Award for Best Actress
  - Camille Claudel – Silver Bear for Best Actress (1989)
- (United Kingdom) Helen Mirren (1984–2006; 22 years)
  - Cal (1984) and The Madness of King George (1995) – Cannes Film Festival Award for Best Actress
  - The Queen – Volpi Cup for Best Actress (2006)
- (United States) Holly Hunter (1988–1993; 5 years)
  - Broadcast News – Silver Bear for Best Actress (1988)
  - The Piano – Cannes Film Festival Award for Best Actress (1993)
- (United States) Meryl Streep (1989–2003; 14 years)
  - Evil Angels – Cannes Film Festival Award for Best Actress (1989)
  - The Hours – Silver Bear for Best Actress (2003)
- (Hong Kong) Maggie Cheung (1992–2004; 12 years)
  - Center Stage – Silver Bear for Best Actress (1992)
  - Clean – Cannes Film Festival Award for Best Actress (2004)
- (Australia) Rose Byrne (2000–2025; 25 years)
  - The Goddess of 1967 – Volpi Cup for Best Actress (2000)
  - If I Had Legs I'd Kick You – Silver Bear for Best Leading Performance (2025)
- (Australia) (United States) Nicole Kidman (2003–2024; 21 years)
  - The Hours – Silver Bear for Best Actress (2003)
  - Babygirl – Volpi Cup for Best Actress (2024)
- (Spain) Penélope Cruz (2006–2021; 15 years)
  - Volver – Cannes Film Festival Award for Best Actress (2006)
  - Parallel Mothers – Volpi Cup for Best Actress (2021)
- (United Kingdom) Charlotte Rampling (2015–2017; 2 years)
  - 45 Years – Silver Bear for Best Actress (2015)
  - Hannah – Volpi Cup for Best Actress (2017)
