= 1st Berlin International Film Festival =

1951 film festival in West Berlin, Germany

- Festival poster
- Opening film: Rebecca
- Location: West Berlin, Germany
- Founded: 1951
- Awards: Golden Bear: Four in a Jeep; Without Leaving an Address; In Beaver Valley; Justice Is Done and Cinderella
- Festival date: 6–17 June 1951
- Website: Website

Berlin International Film Festival chronology
- 2nd

The 1st annual Berlin International Film Festival was held from 6 to 17 June 1951 at the Titiana-Palast cinema. The opening film was Alfred Hitchcock's Rebecca.

At this first Berlin Festival, the Golden Bear award was introduced, and it was awarded to the best film in each of five categories: drama, comedy, crime or adventure, music film, and documentary. This system disappeared already the following year because FIAPF (Federation Internationale des Associations des Producteurs de Films) stated that the awarding of prizes by an expert jury was reserved for "A-festivals" only. Instead, the next year's festival awards were voted on by the audience.

== Jury ==
The following people from West Germany were announced as being on the jury for the festival:

- Fritz Podehl, playwright and producer - Jury President
- Johannes Betzel, cinema owner
- Emil Dovifat, professor of political journalism
- Werner Eisbrenner, composer and conductor
- Günther Geisler, journalist and critic
- Walter Karsch, critic and publisher
- Hilde Lucht-Perske, city councilor
- Tatjana Sais, actress
- Paul Heimann, pedagogue and reader
- Johannes Betzel, cinema operator

== Main Competition ==
The following films were in competition for the Golden Bear awards:

English title	Original title	Director(s)	Production Country
Drama
The Browning Version		Anthony Asquith	United Kingdom
Das gestohlene Jahr		Wilfried Fraß	Austria, West Germany
Dr. Holl		Rolf Hansen	West Germany
The Forbidden Christ	Il Cristo proibito	Curzio Malaparte	Italy
Girls in Uniform	Muchachas de uniforme	Alfredo B. Crevenna	Mexico
God Needs Men	Dieu a besoin des hommes	Jean Delannoy	France
Path of Hope	Il cammino della speranza	Pietro Germi	Italy
Miss Julie	Fröken Julie	Alf Sjöberg	Sweden
Four in a Jeep	Die Vier im Jeep	Leopold Lindtberg	Switzerland
Das seltsame Leben des Herrn Bruggs		Erich Engel	West Germany
Comedy
Without Leaving an Address	...Sans laisser d'adresse	Jean-Paul Le Chanois	France
Geheimnis einer Ehe		Helmut Weiss	West Germany
Living on 'Hope'	Leva på 'Hoppet'	Göran Gentele	Sweden
The Mating Season		Mitchell Leisen	United States
Documentaries
The Undefeated		Paul Dickson	United States
In Beaver Valley		James Algar	United States
Thrillers and adventures
Justice Is Done	Justice est faite	André Cayatte	France
Destination Moon		Irving Pichel	United States
Music film
Cinderella		Wilfred Jackson	United States
The Tales of Hoffmann		Michael Powell and Emeric Pressburger	United Kingdom
Culture Films and Documentaries
Begone Dull Care		Norman McLaren and Evelyn Lambart	Canada
Der gelbe Dom		Eugen Schuhmacher	West Germany
Kleine Nachtgespenster		Eugen Schuhmacher	West Germany
Art and Science Films
Der Film entdeckte Kunstwerke indianischer Vorzeit		Hans Cürlis	West Germany
Goya		Luciano Emmer	Italy
Il paradiso perduto		Luciano Emmer and Enrico Gras	Italy
Advertising Film
Blick ins Paradies		Hans Fischerkoesen	West Germany
Het gala-Concert		?	Netherlands
The Story of Time		Michael Stainer-Hutchins	United Kingdom

== Official Awards ==
=== Main Competition ===
- Golden Bear:
  - Best Drama Film: Four in a Jeep by Leopold Lindtberg
  - Best Comedy Film: Without Leaving an Address by Jean-Paul Le Chanois
  - Best Documentary: In Beaver Valley by James Algar
  - Best Crime or Adventure Film: Justice Is Done by André Cayatte
  - Best Music Film: Cinderella by Wilfred Jackson
- Silver Bear:
  - Best Drama Film: Path of Hope by Pietro Germi
  - Best Comedy Film: Living on 'Hope' by Göran Gentele
  - Best Music Film: The Tales of Hoffmann by Michael Powell and Emeric Pressburger
- Bronze Bear:
  - Best Drama Film: The Browning Version by Anthony Asquith
  - Best Comedy Film: The Mating Season by Mitchell Leisen
  - Best Documentary: The Undefeated by Paul Dickson
  - Best Crime or Adventure Film: Destination Moon by Irving Pichel
- Golden Medal:
  - Best Culture Films and Documentaries: Kleine Nachtgespenster by Eugen Schuhmacher
  - Best Arts and Science Film: Der Film entdeckte Kunstwerke indianischer Vorzeit by Hans Cürlis
  - Best Advertising Film: The Story of Time by Michael Stainer-Hutchins
- Silver Medal:
  - Best Culture Films and Documentaries: Begone Dull Care by Norman McLaren and Evelyn Lambart
  - Best Arts and Science Film: Goya by Luciano Emmer
  - Best Advertising Film: Het gala-Concert
- Bronze Medal:
  - Best Culture Films and Documentaries: Der gelbe Dom by Eugen Schuhmacher
  - Best Arts and Science Film: Bosch
  - Best Advertising Film: Blick ins Paradies by Hans Fischerkoesen

=== Audience Vote ===
- Large Bronze plate: Cinderella by Wilfred Jackson
- Small Bronze plate: The Browning Version by Anthony Asquith

=== Special Prize of the city of West Berlin ===
- Special Prize for an Excellent Film Achievement:
  - The Forbidden Christ by Curzio Malaparte
  - God Needs Men by Jean Delannoy
- Certificate of Honour: Dr. Holl by Rolf Hansen
