= Anna Höllering =

Austrian film editor

- Born: 16 April 1895; Baden bei Wien, Austro-Hungarian Empire
- Died: 3 September 1987 (aged 92); Natschbach-Loipersbach, Austria
- Occupation: Film editor
- Years active: 1936–1967 (film)

Anna Höllering (1895–1987) was an Austrian film editor. She was active in the German film industry during the Nazi era and the postwar West German period. She frequently worked alongside the director Rolf Hansen.

== Selected filmography ==
- Back in the Country (1936)
- The Abduction of the Sabine Women (1936)
- Nights in Andalusia (1938)
- In the Name of the People (1939)
- Police Report (1939)
- The Strange Woman (1939)
- Small Town Poet (1940)
- Two Worlds (1940)
- The Way to Freedom (1941)
- The Great Love (1942)
- Back Then (1943)
- The Trial (1948)
- The White Hell of Pitz Palu (1950)
- Dr. Holl (1951)
- The Great Temptation (1952)
- Annaluise and Anton (1953)
- The Life of Surgeon Sauerbruch (1954)
- Beloved Enemy (1955)
- Devil in Silk (1956)
- And Lead Us Not Into Temptation (1957)
- Resurrection (1958)
- Gustav Adolf's Page (1960)

== Bibliography ==
- Giesen, Rolf. Nazi Propaganda Films: A History and Filmography. McFarland & Company, 2003.
- Rother, Rainer (ed.) German Film: From the Archives of the Deutsche Kinemathek. Hatje Cantz Verlag, 2024.
