= In Beaver Valley =

1950 film

- Directed by: James Algar
- Written by: Lawrence Edward Watkin; Ted Sears
- Produced by: Walt Disney
- Narrated by: Winston Hibler
- Cinematography: Alfred Milotte
- Edited by: Norman R. Palmer
- Music by: Paul Smith
- Production company: Walt Disney Productions
- Distributed by: RKO Radio Pictures
- Release date: July 19, 1950
- Running time: 32 minutes
- Country: United States
- Language: English

In Beaver Valley is a 1950 American short documentary film directed by James Algar. and written by Lawrence Edward Watkin and Ted Sears. It was produced by Walt Disney as part of the True-Life Adventures series of nature documentaries.

== Plot ==
The short takes place in the mountainy West of the United States Of America. Despite the name, it is actually varied in the coverage of the nature, unlike The Olympic Elk. It then briefly focuses on a male beaver who lives a nomadic lifestyle. Making dens and hunting for food. We eventually then focus on wildlife such as birds. Eventually, the fierce lurking predator of the coyote appears. After a bit we see an American Black Bear who eats some fish. Meanwhile the beaver has met a female and had a young male, being the main breadwinner from then on. By Winter, it is cold and while the youngster is walking, a bunch of Sea Otter slide down. Unfortunately for the beaver, the coyote has appeared waiting for his next meal, but the beaver successfully hides. He can now easily rest in hibernation. However, the coyote lurks, looking for another meal.

== Accolades ==
The film won an Oscar in 1951 for Best Short Subject (Two-Reel). At the 1st Berlin International Film Festival it won the Golden Bear (Documentaries) award.

== Cast ==
- Winston Hibler as narrator
