= 2nd Berlin International Film Festival =

1952 film festival in West Berlin, Germany

- Location: West Berlin, Germany
- Founded: 1951
- Awards: Golden Bear: One Summer of Happiness
- Festival date: 12–25 June 1952
- Website: Website

Berlin International Film Festival chronology
- 3rd 1st

The 2nd annual Berlin International Film Festival was held from 12 to 25 June 1952.

The Golden Bear was awarded to Swedish film One Summer of Happiness by the audience vote.

The FIAPF prohibited the festival from awarding any official prizes by a jury (which in the early 50's only Cannes and Venice were allowed to do so), instead the awards were given through audience voting. This was only changed in 1956 when the FIAPF granted Berlin the so-called "A-Status".

Orson Welles's Othello was banned from the festival due to his alleged anti-German remarks. The festival held a retrospective on silent films.

== Main Competition ==
The following films were in competition for the Golden Bear award:

English title	Original title	Director(s)	Production Country
Cry, the Beloved Country		Zoltán Korda	United Kingdom
Death of a Salesman		László Benedek	United States
Fanfan la Tulipe		Christian-Jaque	France, Italy
Great Man	Un grand patron	Yves Ciampi	France
Miracle in Milan	Miracolo a Milano	Vittorio De Sica	Italy
One Summer of Happiness	Hon dansade en sommar	Arne Mattsson	Sweden
The Overcoat	Il Cappotto	Alberto Lattuada	Italy
Rashomon	羅生門	Akira Kurosawa	Japan
The River	Le Fleuve	Jean Renoir	France, India, United States
Three Forbidden Stories	Tre storie proibite	Augusto Genina	Italy
Under the Thousand Lanterns	Unter den tausend Laternen	Erich Engel	West Germany, France
Wife For a Night	Moglie per una notte	Mario Camerini	Italy

== Official Awards ==
The following prizes were awarded by the audience vote:

- Golden Bear: One Summer of Happiness by Arne Mattsson
- Silver Bear: Fanfan la Tulipe by Christian-Jaque
- Bronze Berlin Bear: Cry, the Beloved Country by Zoltán Korda
