= Dr. Holl =

1951 film

- Film poster
- Directed by: Rolf Hansen
- Written by: H. O. Meissner; Thea von Harbou
- Produced by: Friedrich A. Mainz; Carl Wilhelm Tetting
- Starring: Maria Schell; Dieter Borsche; Carl Wery
- Cinematography: Franz Weihmayr
- Edited by: Anna Höllering
- Music by: Mark Lothar
- Production company: Fama-Film
- Distributed by: National-Film
- Release date: 23 March 1951
- Running time: 102 minutes
- Country: West Germany
- Language: German

Dr. Holl is a 1951 West German drama film directed by Rolf Hansen and starring Maria Schell, Dieter Borsche and Carl Wery. At the 1st Berlin International Film Festival it won the Certificate of Honour award. It was shot at the Bavaria Studios in Munich and on location in Rome and around Sorrento and the Gulf of Naples. The film's sets were designed by the art director Robert Herlth.

== Plot ==
The industrialist Alberti is a very wealthy man, but is concerned about Angelika, his fragile, anemic daughter. She is terminally ill and frequently bedridden. Alberti would give all his wealth if he could do anything for Angelika. Alberti has consulted many doctors about his daughter's case, but all effort have been in vain. The doctors have long given up. But to "give up" does not appear in the vocabulary of Angelika's father. He finds an ally in Helga, a medical student who earns her living as a nurse.

Helga is as good as gold, and she has a fiancé, Dr. Holl, a medical researcher, who works day and night in the laboratory. Holl appears to be well on its way to becoming a great doctor. When he learns of the "hopeless" case of Angelika Alberti, he decides to focus entirely on it. Helga persuades Holl to go with her to the home of Alberti and continue his research there. In the old Alberti, Holl and Helga find a generous benefactor for all their expenses, including the construction of a medical laboratory.

Angelika, who knows nothing of the relationship between Holl and Helga, falls in love with her benefactor, Dr. Holl. Unselfishly, Helga is willing to allow Holl to marry Angelika, so that she might die intoxicated with bliss. Because of Angelika's condition, Helga is confident that this marriage is unlikely to continue indefinitely. Out of pity Holl falls in love with Angelika. However, Dr. Holl's research succeeds in developing a medicine that can save Angelika, who becomes healthier day by day. She begins to play the piano and sings. Helga is in disbelief, as she had never imagined such an outcome.

Soon, however, Helga begins to realize that Angelika is taking away her fiancé, as she becomes healthier with every passing day. Eventually Helga comes to terms with the fact that she has lost Holl. Excited by Angelika's recovery and the prospect of his formerly sick daughter marrying her dream man, the old Alberti seeks to financially compensate Helga for her loss. He offers to fund the construction of an entire hospital. Helga, a very modern woman, decides to take this opportunity to undertake a professional career.

== Cast ==
- Maria Schell as Angelika Alberti
- Dieter Borsche as Dr. Holl
- Heidemarie Hatheyer as Helga Roemer
- Carl Wery as Alberti
- Otto Gebühr as Professor Amriss
- Franz Schafheitlin as Professor Godenbergh
- Gerd Brüdern as Corvus
- Lina Carstens as Frau von Bergmann
- Claire Reigbert as Margret / The Housekeeper
- Adrian Hoven as Tonio / Gardener
- Marianne Koch as Anna
- Gustav Waldau as Pfarrer / The Priest
