= The Way to Freedom =

1941 film

- Directed by: Rolf Hansen
- Written by: Harald Braun; Jacob Geis; Rolf Hansen
- Produced by: Carl Froelich
- Starring: Zarah Leander; Hans Stüwe; Siegfried Breuer.
- Cinematography: Franz Weihmayr
- Edited by: Anna Höllering
- Music by: Theo Mackeben
- Production company: UFA
- Distributed by: UFA
- Release date: 7 May 1941
- Running time: 113 minutes
- Country: Germany
- Language: German

The Way to Freedom (German: Der Weg ins Freie) is a 1941 German historical drama film directed by Rolf Hansen and starring Zarah Leander, Hans Stüwe and Siegfried Breuer. It was shot at the Tempelhof Studios in Berlin and location shooting around Gransee and Neustrelitz as well as the vicinity of Innsbruck. The film's sets were designed by the art director Walter Haag.

== Cast ==
- Zarah Leander as Antonia Corvelli
- Hans Stüwe as Detlev von Blossin - Antonias Mann
- Siegfried Breuer as Graf Stefan Oginski
- Eva Immermann as Luise
- Agnes Windeck as Baronin von Blossin
- Hedwig Wangel as Barbaccia
- Walther Ludwig as Tomaso Rezzi - Singer
- Albert Florath as Dr. Hensius
- Herbert Hübner as Landrat von Strempel
- Ralph Lothar as Achim Strempl
- Antonie Jaeckel as Frau von Strempel
- Karl John as Fritz
- Claire Reigbert as Mamsell Dörte
- Olaf Bach as Ein Pole
- Leo Peukert as Director der Wiener Hofoper
- Julia Serda as Frau des Operndirektors
- Walther Süssenguth as Morescu
- Victor Janson as Machandl
- Kurt Meisel as Ein Student
- Hilde von Stolz as Melanie
- Oscar Sabo as Inspizient
- Karl Günther as Kommissar
- Hans Reinmar as Bariton in der 'Semiramis'
- Emil Heß as Müetli
- Josefine Dora as Frau Lüchzagel
- Jakob Tiedtke as Director der Oper Bergamo
- Sigrid Becker as Junge Dienstmagd auf Gut Blossin
- Gisela Breiderhoff as Oginskis Begleiterin im Spielsaal
- Fritz Hinz-Fabricius as Direktor der Spielbank
- Grete Greef-Fabri as Frau am Spieltisch
- Julius Albert Eckhoff as Mann im Spielsaal
- Julius Brandt as Opernkomponist in Wien
- Vera Complojer as Revolutionärin in Wien
- Louis Ralph as Revolutionär in Wien
- Karl Etlinger as Oginskis Diener Clemens
- Hugo Flink as General beim Empfang bei Antonia
- Hugo Froelich as Hotelbesitzer in Pommern
- Knut Hartwig as Landarbeiter auf Gut Blossin
- Karl Hellmer as Nachtportier der Wiener Hofoper
- Julius E. Herrmann as Kapellmeister der Oper in Bergamo
- Fritz Soot as Sänger bei der Probe
- Friedrich Honna as Mann, dessen Bett aus dem Fenster geworfen wird
- Wilhelm P. Krüger as Staatsbeamter in Pommern
- Michael von Newlinsky as Feuerwehrmann bei der Rigoletto-Aufführung
- Gustav Püttjer as Pommerscher Pferdekutscher mit Oginski
- Ernst Rotmund as Gastwirt Filippi in Mailand
- Otto Sauter-Sarto as Wirt in der Rigoletto-Aufführung in Bergamo
- Rudolf Vones as Blossins Diener in Wien
- Bruno Ziener as Kantor des pommerschen Kinderchors
- Reinhold Weiglin as Alter Mann im pommerschen Dorfkrug

== Bibliography ==
- Klaus, Ulrich J. Deutsche Tonfilme: Jahrgang 1940. Klaus-Archiv, 1988.
- O'Brien, Mary-Elizabeth. Nazi Cinema as Enchantment: The Politics of Entertainment in the Third Reich. Camden House, 2006.
- Skopal, Pavel & Winkel, Roel Vande. (ed.) Film Professionals in Nazi-Occupied Europe: Mediation Between the National-Socialist Cultural 'New Order' and Local Structures. Springer International Publishing, 2021.
