= Fanfan la Tulipe =

1952 French film

- Original 1952 Film Poster
- Directed by: Christian-Jaque
- Written by: René Wheeler; René Fallet; Christian-Jaque; Henri Jeanson
- Produced by: Francis Cosne; Georges Dancigers; Alexandre Mnouchkine
- Starring: Gérard Philipe; Gina Lollobrigida
- Cinematography: Christian Matras
- Edited by: Jacques Desagneaux
- Music by: Maurice Thiriet; Georges Van Parys
- Distributed by: Filmsonor
- Release date: 21 March 1952
- Running time: 102 minutes
- Countries: France; Italy
- Language: French
- Box office: 6,733,287 admissions (France)

Fanfan la Tulipe is a 1952 French comedy adventure film directed by Christian-Jaque. It has also been categorized under swashbuckler films. The film starred Gérard Philipe and Gina Lollobrigida.

TIME magazine placed it on its ten-best list for 1953, the only non-English language film to make the list.

== Plot ==
Fanfan is a charming, attractive young Frenchman who is trying to escape a shotgun marriage during the Seven Years' War. At this vulnerable point in his life, he is approached by the daughter of a recruiting officer, Adeline, who tells him that if he joins the army he will find fame, fortune, and marry the king's daughter. Accordingly, he signs up, only to discover that she made the whole thing up in order for her father to receive a recruiting bonus. Nevertheless, encouraged by a series of improbable circumstances, he accepts her prediction as his destiny. A series of events ensues which shows off to great advantage his athleticism and leadership ability. As the film progresses, we become aware of a developing attraction between himself and Adeline which however conflicts with his perceived "destiny" of marrying a king's daughter.

== Cast ==
- Gérard Philipe as Fanfan la Tulipe
- Gina Lollobrigida as Adeline La Franchise
- Marcel Herrand as Louis XV
- Olivier Hussenot as Tranche-Montagne
- Noël Roquevert as Fier-à-Bras
- Henri Rollan as Le maréchal d'Estrées
- Nerio Bernardi as La Franchise
- Jean-Marc Tennberg as Lebel
- Geneviève Page as La marquise de Pompadour
- Sylvie Pelayo as Henriette de France
- Lolita De Silva as La dame d'honneur
- Irène Young as Marion
- Georgette Anys as Madame Tranche-Montagne
- Henri Hennery as Guillot
- Lucien Callamand as Le maréchal de Brandebourg

== Production ==
The film was photographed in black-and-white by Christian Matras. A colorized version was created (supervised by Sophie Juin for Les Films Ariane) and issued in 2000 on DVD in Europe alongside the original version.

== Awards ==
Won

- 1952 Berlin International Film Festival – Silver Berlin Bear
- 1952 Cannes Film Festival – Best Director

Nominated

- 1952 Cannes Film Festival – Grand Prize of the Festival

== Legacy ==
The film was remade in 2003 with Penélope Cruz in Lollobrigida's role.
