= The Browning Version (1951 film) =

1951 British film by Anthony Asquith

- Theatrical poster
- Directed by: Anthony Asquith
- Written by: Terence Rattigan
- Based on: The Browning Version; 1948 play by Terence Rattigan
- Produced by: Teddy Baird; Earl St. John
- Starring: Michael Redgrave; Jean Kent; Nigel Patrick
- Cinematography: Desmond Dickinson
- Edited by: John D. Guthridge
- Music by: Arnold Bax; Kenneth Essex (both uncredited stock music)
- Distributed by: General Film Distributors (UK); Universal-International (USA)
- Release date: 15 March 1951
- Running time: 90 minutes
- Country: United Kingdom
- Language: English
- Budget: £145,000

The Browning Version is a 1951 British drama film based on the 1948 play of the same name by Terence Rattigan, who also wrote the screenplay. It was directed by Anthony Asquith and starred Michael Redgrave. In 1994, the play was filmed again with Albert Finney in the lead.

== Plot ==
On the last day of the school term, the headmaster announces during morning prayers that teacher Mr. Fletcher will retire to play cricket while classics teacher Andrew Crocker-Harris will retire after 18 years due to ill health. After morning prayers, Andrew's students, who have nicknamed him "the Crock," speculate about his heart aliment but otherwise don't care as he is strict. During class, Andrew makes a Latin joke. None of the students understand it, but one student, Taplow, laughs out of sympathy. For this Andrew scolds him in front of the other boys.

The same afternoon Taplow has to do an extra hour of school work at Andrew’s house. While Taplow waits in his study for Andrew to arrive, Frank Hunter, the science master, also arrives. Taplow makes an impression of Andrew’s unusual way of speaking, when Millie, Andrew‘s wife, arrives and witnesses this. After Andrew finally does arrive, he and Taplow study the Agamemnon, while Hunter continues a months-long affair with Andrew's much younger wife, Millie, in the garden.

Later that afternoon, at the school cricket game, the headmaster informs Andrew that the school's governing board will not grant him pension upon his early retirement. Furthermore, the headmaster wants Andrew to give the speech at the prize-giving ceremony before Fletcher, as the latter is more well-liked among the students. Andrew agrees to this.

Andrew leaves the cricket match to clear his belongings from the classroom. Inside his desk, he finds his unfinished translation of the Agamemnon. Andrew's successor Gilbert walks into the classroom, in which during the conversation, he inadvertently reveals that the students had called Andrew "the Himmler of the Lower-Fifth". Andrew is so shocked by this that he tells his successor how he has failed as a schoolmaster.

Andrew returns home when Taplow drops by to give him a parting gift: Robert Browning's translation of the Agamemnon which he has inscribed with the Greek phrase that translates as "God from afar looks graciously upon a gentle master". Andrew bursts into tears in front of Taplow and thanks him.

Before the farewell dinner party in his honor, Andrew tells Millie about Taplow's gift. Millie bluntly states that Taplow must have been trying to bribe Andrew to get his promotion. Shattered, he takes his medicines and goes upstairs to his room. Disgusted at her behavior, Frank breaks up with Millie, leaves, and tells Andrew to confirm Taplow's attempted bribe. Before he leaves, Frank asks Andrew to leave Millie. Andrew then reveals he long knew about Millie's affair with Frank.

After dinner, Andrew and Frank are alone at the dining table. There, they discuss Andrew's marriage, in which he reflects she became bitter as a result of not satisfying her sexual needs. Frank then pledges to visit once Andrew has assumed his position at a new school. As the dinner guests enjoy a fireworks display, Andrew tells Millie they will no longer live together once he takes his new position.

The next day, Taplow arrives at the Crocker-Harris's residence to hand Millie a note from Frank. He finds Andrew's translation and leaves with it. Inside Frank's note, Millie finds his cigarette case and leaves the residence, not saying a word to her husband.

At the ceremony, Andrew tells the headmaster he has changed his mind and intends to speak after Fletcher. The headmaster resists initially but defers to Andrew's request. After Fletcher speaks, Andrew reads from his prepared speech, but stops and tells the students that he has failed as a teacher and apologises. The students are shocked and then burst into spontaneous applause. After the graduation, Taplow returns Andrew his translation and praises it. Andrew thanks Taplow and infers he has been promoted to the Upper-Fifth.

== Cast ==
- Michael Redgrave as Andrew Crocker-Harris
- Jean Kent as Millie Crocker-Harris
- Nigel Patrick as Frank Hunter
- Ronald Howard as Gilbert
- Wilfrid Hyde-White as the Headmaster
- Brian Smith as Taplow
- Bill Travers as Fletcher
- Judith Furse as Mrs. Williamson
- Peter Jones as Carstairs
- Sarah Lawson as Betty Carstairs
- Scott Harold as Rev. Williamson
- Paul Medland as Wilson
- Ivan Samson as Lord Baxter
- Josephine Middleton as Mrs. Frobisher

== Production ==
Rattigan and Asquith encountered a lack of enthusiasm from producers to turn the play into a film until they met Earl St. John at Rank.

"I started out as manager of a small out-of-town cinema, and I viewed films from the out-of-London angle", said St John. "This experience made me realise that the ordinary people in the remotest places in the country were entitled to see the works of the best modern British playwrights." The budget was £145,000 of which £15,000 went for the rights; St John said this "was not bad" considering he paid £100,000 for the rights to Harvey.

Eric Portman originated the role on stage but turned down the film role. Margaret Lockwood was originally meant to play the role of Millie but turned down the part. Jean Kent played it instead. (Kent often stepped into roles originally envisioned for Lockwood.)

The film was shot at Pinewood Studios in 1950 and generally released in April, 1951. The school exteriors were filmed on location at Sherborne School in Sherborne, Dorset.

The Greek text that appears on the blackboard in Crocker-Harris's classroom is the Agamemnon lines 414–9:

πόθῳ δ᾽ ὑπερποντίας
φάσμα δόξει δόμων ἀνάσσειν.
εὐμόρφων δὲ κολοσσῶν
ἔχθεται χάρις ἀνδρί:
ὀμμάτων δ᾽ ἐν ἀχηνίαις
ἔρρει πᾶσ᾽ Ἀφροδίτα.

Apparently a description of Menelaus's despair after his abandonment by Helen, the lines were translated by Robert Browning thus:

"And, through desire of one across the main,
A ghost will seem within the house to reign.
And hateful to the husband is the grace
Of well-shaped statues: from—in place of eyes
Those blanks—all Aphrodite dies."

== Reception ==
The film was popular at the British box office. It was judged by Kinematograph Weekly as a "notable performer" at British cinemas in 1951.

== Awards ==
Won

- Cannes Film Festival
  - Best Actor (Michael Redgrave)
  - Best Screenplay
- Berlin International Film Festival
  - Bronze Berlin Bear (Drama)
  - Small Bronze Plate

Nominated

- Cannes Film Festival – Palme d'Or

== See also ==
- The Browning Version (1994 film), another feature film version starring Albert Finney
