= Devil in Silk =

1956 film

- Directed by: Rolf Hansen
- Written by: Jochen Huth; Alf Teichs
- Based on: Der Teufel nebenan (novel) by Gina Kaus
- Produced by: Heinz Abel; Artur Brauner; Alf Teichs
- Starring: Lilli Palmer; Curd Jürgens; Winnie Markus
- Cinematography: Franz Weihmayr
- Edited by: Anna Höllering
- Music by: Mark Lothar
- Production company: Fono Film
- Distributed by: Deutsche Film Hansa
- Release date: 5 January 1956
- Running time: 106 minutes
- Country: West Germany
- Language: German

Devil in Silk (German: Teufel in Seide) is a 1956 West German drama film directed by Rolf Hansen and starring Lilli Palmer, Curd Jürgens, and Winnie Markus. After leaving his overbearing wife for another woman, a composer is suspected of her murder when she is found dead.

It was shot at the Spandau Studios in Berlin. Location shooting took place at Kampen on the island of Sylt in Schleswig-Holstein. The film's sets were designed by the art directors Robert Herlth and Arno Richter and Peter Röhrig, with costumes by Pierre Balmain.

== Plot ==
On a train journey, penniless composer Thomas meets rich publisher Melanie. The two get married and Melanie gets Thomas a lucrative job in her publishing house. However, Melanie turns out to be a jealous control freak and Thomas is unhappy in their marriage. When he begins an affair with his secretary and demands a divorce from Melanie, she commits suicide and makes it appear as if he killed her.

== Cast ==
- Lilli Palmer as Melanie
- Curd Jürgens as Thomas Ritter
- Winnie Markus as Sabine
- Adelheid Seeck as Sylvia Angermann
- Hans Nielsen as Dr. Zacharias
- Wolfgang Büttner as Dr. Hess
- Hilde Körber as Sophie
- Paul Bildt as Dr. Heinsheimer
- Helmuth Rudolph as Georg Angermann
- Robert Meyn as Untersuchungsrichter
- Otto Graf as Gerichtsvorsitzender
- Wolf Martini as Prosecutor
- Else Ehser as Frau Schwarz
- Paul Bösiger as Peter Dornberg

== Bibliography ==
- Bock, Hans-Michael; Bergfelder, Tim, eds. (2009). The Concise Cinegraph: Encyclopaedia of German Cinema. New York: Berghahn Books. ISBN 978-1-57181-655-9.
