= And Lead Us Not Into Temptation =

- Directed by: Rolf Hansen
- Written by: Ödön von Horvath (play); Hans Höllering
- Produced by: Artur Brauner
- Starring: Johanna Matz; Heidemarie Hatheyer; Gerhard Riedmann
- Cinematography: Franz Weihmayr
- Edited by: Anna Höllering
- Music by: Mark Lothar
- Production company: CCC Film
- Distributed by: Constantin Film
- Release date: 1 November 1957
- Running time: 100 minutes
- Country: West Germany
- Language: German

And Lead Us Not Into Temptation (German: ...und führe uns nicht in Versuchung) is a 1957 West German drama film directed by Rolf Hansen and starring Johanna Matz, Heidemarie Hatheyer and Gerhard Riedmann. It was shot at the Spandau Studios in Berlin and on location around Bolzano in Trentino. The film's sets were designed by the art directors Kurt Herlth and Robert Herlth.

== Synopsis ==
After causing a tragic crash while flirting with a woman, a small town railwayman is haunted by guilt.

== Cast ==
- Johanna Matz as Anna
- Heidemarie Hatheyer as Frau Hudetz
- Gerhard Riedmann as Hudetz
- Rudolf Forster as von Hausen
- Annie Rosar as Frau Leimgruber
- Willy Rösner as Aigner
- Bruno Dallansky as Ferdinand
- Karl Ehmann as Pfarrer
- Erica Beer as Sekretärin
- Wolfgang Hebenstreit as Prosecutor
- Nora Minor as Freundin
- Hugo Gottschlich as Kondukteur
- Minna Spaeth as Zenzi
- Hans Fitz as Landarzt
- Martin Berliner as Kommissar

== Bibliography ==
- Bock, Hans-Michael & Bergfelder, Tim. The Concise CineGraph. Encyclopedia of German Cinema. Berghahn Books, 2009.
