= Without Leaving an Address =

1951 film

- French film poster
- Directed by: Jean-Paul Le Chanois
- Written by: Jean-Paul Le Chanois; Alex Joffé
- Produced by: Raoul Ploquin; Robert Dorfmann
- Starring: Bernard Blier
- Cinematography: Marc Fossard
- Edited by: Emma Le Chanois
- Music by: Joseph Kosma
- Distributed by: Les Films Corona
- Release date: 17 January 1951
- Running time: 90 minutes
- Country: France
- Language: French
- Box office: $15.2 million

Without Leaving an Address (French: ...Sans laisser d'adresse) is a 1951 French comedy film directed by Jean-Paul Le Chanois. At the 1st Berlin International Film Festival it won the Golden Bear (Comedies) award. The film's sets were designed by the art directors Max Douy and Serge Piménoff.

== Plot ==
Thérèse has a child but the father left her without leaving an address. She hires taxi driver Émile to find her lover in Paris.

== Cast ==
- Bernard Blier as Émile Gauthier
- Danièle Delorme as Thérèse Ravenaz
- Pierre Trabaud as Gaston
- Arlette Marchal as Madame Forestier
- Pierre Mondy as Forestier's friend
- Juliette Gréco as the singer
- Paul Ville as Victor (the agitated driver)
- Yvette Etiévant as Adrienne Gauthier (Émile's wife)
- Sophie Leclair as Raymonde (Gaston's girl-friend)
- Gérard Oury as a journalist
- France Roche as Catherine
- Julien Carette as the craftsman
- Colette Régis as a difficult female customer
- Sylvain as a difficult customer
- Christian Lude as Marcel Forestier (the dentist)
- Louis de Funès as the father-to-be in the waiting room
