= Goya (film) =

- Film poster
- Directed by: Pablo Orta
- Written by: Pablo Orta
- Produced by: Luis Beltrán; José Ramón Mikelajáuregui; Laura Ramirez; Angélica Sotelo
- Starring: Eutimio Fuentes; Mateo Valles; Ruth Ramos
- Production companies: FOPROCINE; Departamento de Imagen y Sonido; IMCINE
- Release date: June 17, 2022 (Guadalajara)
- Running time: 87 minutes
- Country: Mexico
- Language: Spanish

Goya is a 2022 Mexican drama film written and directed by Pablo Orta in his directorial debut. It features Eutimio Fuentes, Mateo Valles and Ruth Ramos.

== Synopsis ==
The plans of the brothers César and Mateo are frustrated by the illness of Goya, their neighbor's semi-abandoned dog. Both brothers along with Camila, a neighbor, will embark on a journey to save Goya.

== Cast ==
The actors participating in this film are:

- Eutimio Fuentes as César
- Mateo Valles as Mateo
- Ruth Ramos as Camila

== Production ==
It was financed by the Fund for Quality Cinematographic Production (FOPROCINE). Filming was planned to start in April 2020, but was delayed until September 2021 due to the COVID-19 pandemic. Principal photography took 5 weeks to complete.

== Release ==
It had its international premiere on June 17, 2022, at the 37th Guadalajara International Film Festival.

== Reception ==
=== Critical reception ===
Alfredo Naime from La Jornada proclaimed that the film is a promising debut by director Pablo Orto, because the film is well made, with a flexible tone and good character development.

=== Accolades ===
Year	Award	Category	Recipient	Result	Ref.
2022	Guadalajara International Film Festival	Best Mexican Film - Audience Award	Goya	Won	
2023	Oklahoma Latino Film Festival	Best Feature Film	Goya	Won	
2023	Oklahoma Latino Film Festival	Best Director	Pablo Orta	Won	
2023	Oklahoma Latino Film Festival	Best Actor	Eutimio Fuentes	Won	
2023	Oklahoma Latino Film Festival	Best Cinematography	Jhasua Camarena Romero	Won	
