= Golden Bear =

Highest prize awarded at the Berlin International Film Festival

- Goldener Bär (German)
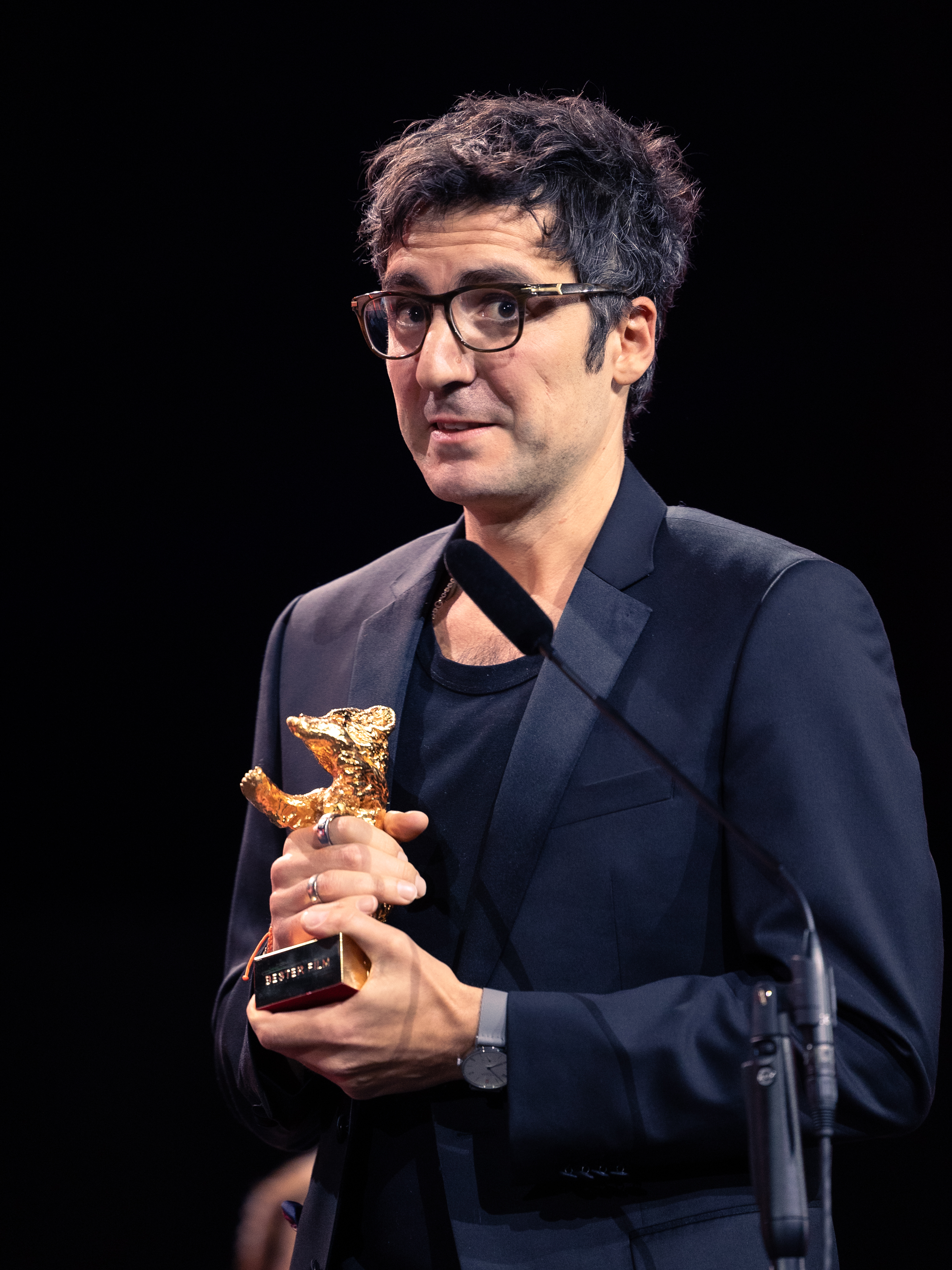
- 2026 recipient: İlker Çatak
- Location: Berlin
- Country: Germany
- Presented by: Berlin International Film Festival
- First award: 1951
- Winner: Yellow Letters by İlker Çatak (2026)
- Website: www.berlinale.de

The Golden Bear (German: Goldener Bär) is the highest prize awarded for the best film at the Berlin International Film Festival and is, along with the Palme d'Or and the Golden Lion, widely considered among the most prestigious film festival awards. The bear is the heraldic animal of Berlin, featured on both the coat of arms and flag of Berlin.

== History ==
The winners of the first Berlin International Film Festival in 1951 were determined by a West German panel, with five winners of the Golden Bear, divided by categories and genres. Between 1952 and 1955, the winners of the Golden Bear were determined by the audience members. In 1956, the Fédération Internationale des Associations de Producteurs de Films formally accredited the festival, and since then, the Golden Bear has been awarded by an international jury.

From 2026, the non-English language winners will also be automatically eligible for the Academy Award for Best International Feature Film.

=== The statuette ===
The statuette shows a bear standing on its hind legs and is based on the 1932 design by German sculptor Renée Sintenis of Berlin's heraldic mascot that later became the symbol of the festival. It has been manufactured since either the first or third edition by art foundry Hermann Noack.

The original award was redesigned in a larger version in 1960, with the left arm of the bear raised as opposed to the right in the former model.

As of 2010, the bear is 20 cm (7.9 in) high and is fixed onto a base where the winning name is engraved. The figurine consists of a bronze core, which is then plated with a layer of gold. The total weight of the award is 4 kg (8.8 lb).

== Winners ==
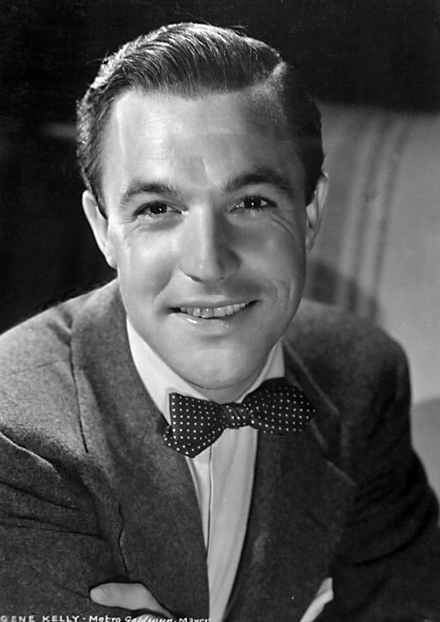
Gene Kelly won for Invitation to the Dance (1956).

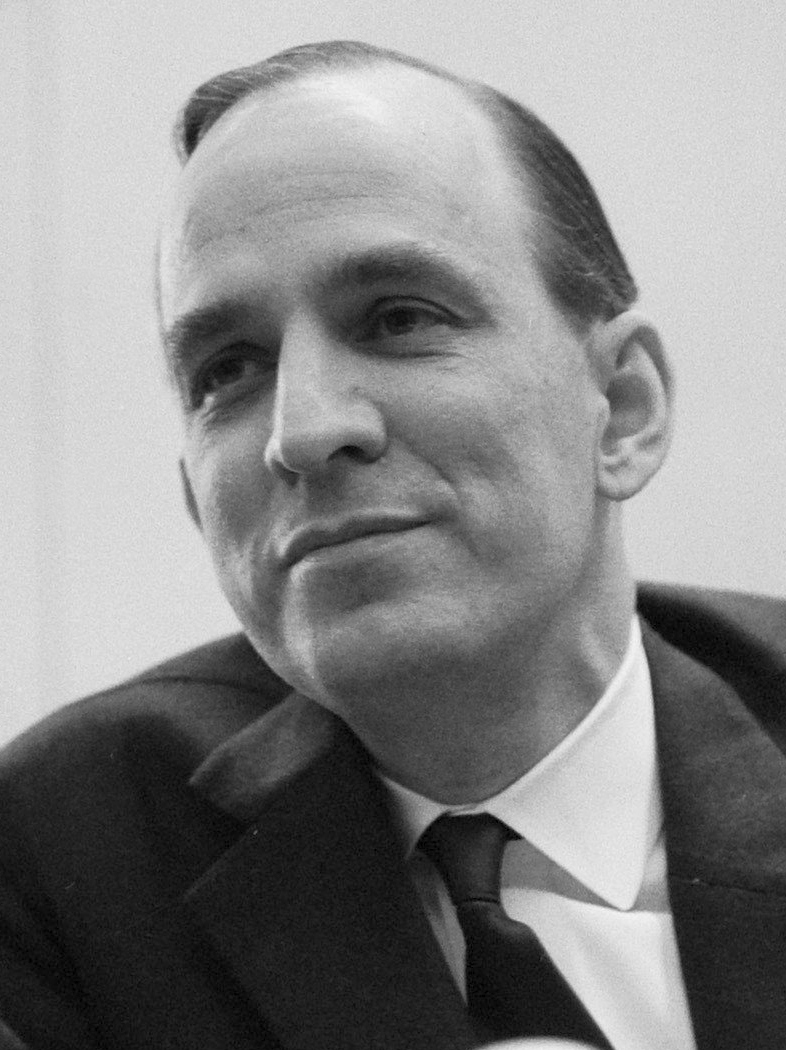
Ingmar Bergman won for Wild Strawberries (1958).

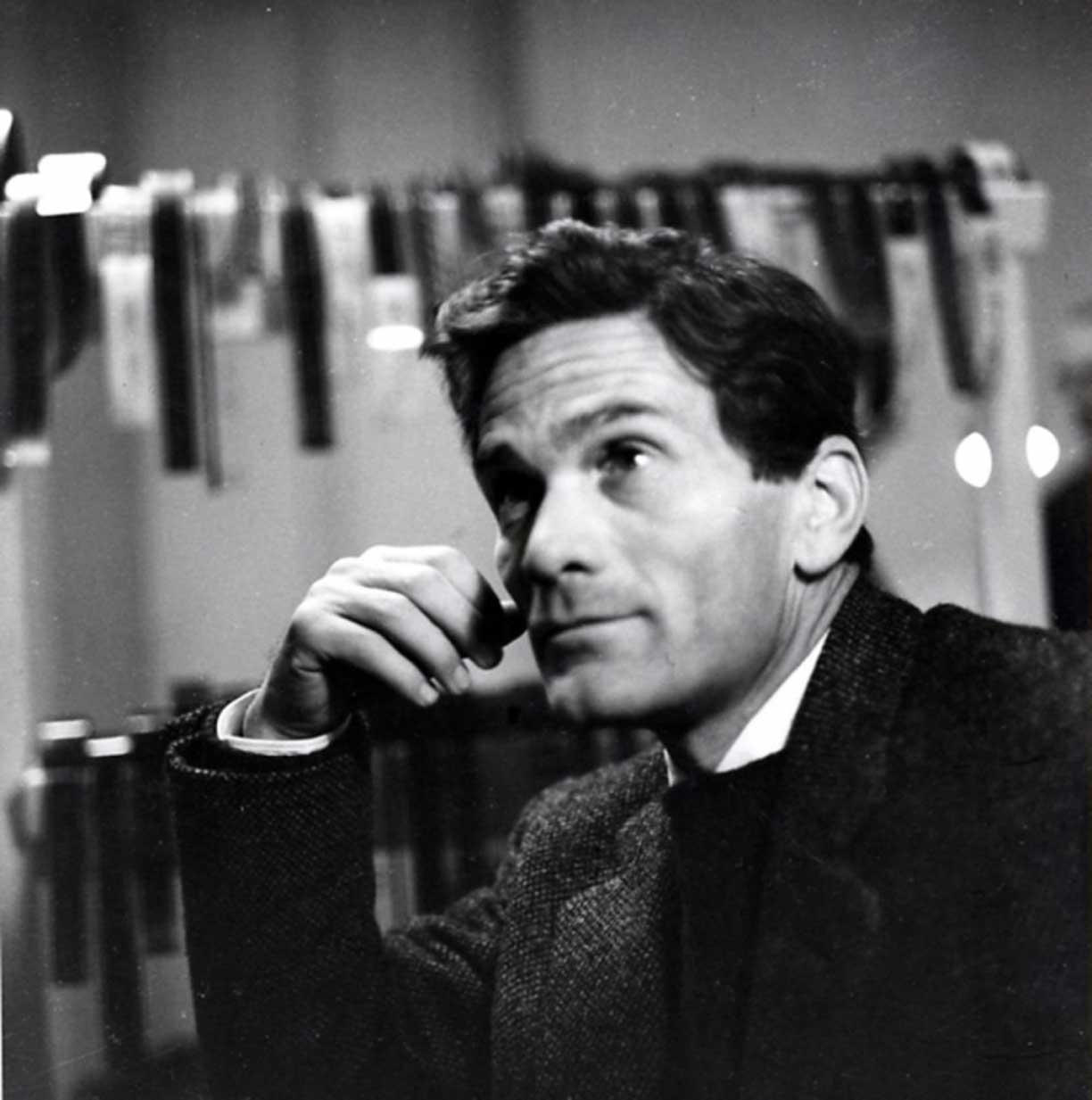
Pier Paolo Pasolini won for The Canterbury Tales (1972).

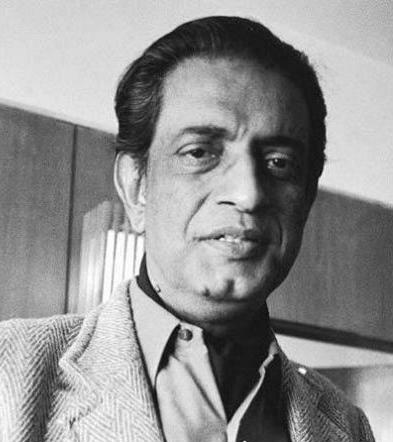
Satyajit Ray won for Distant Thunder (1973).

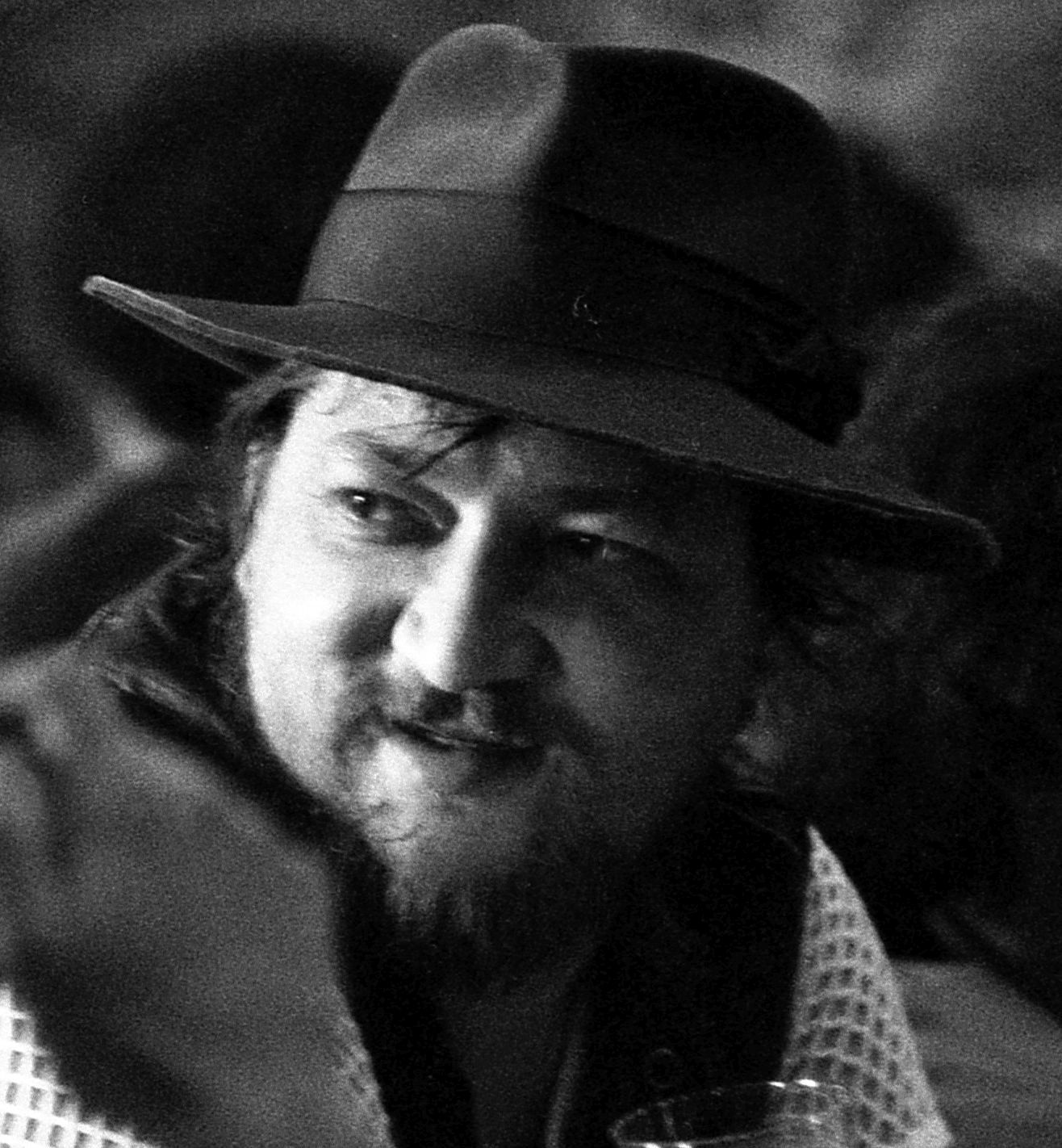
Rainer Werner Fassbinder won for Veronika Voss (1982).

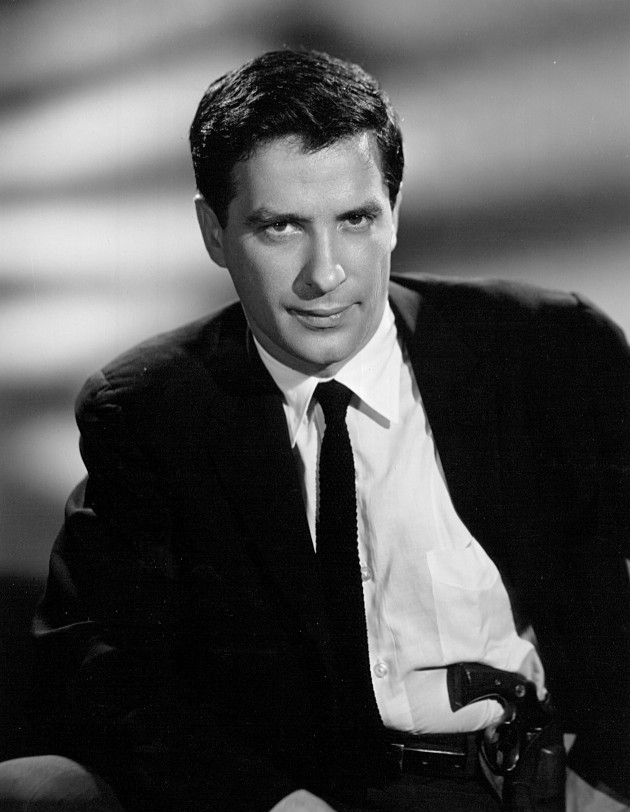
John Cassavetes won for Love Streams (1983).

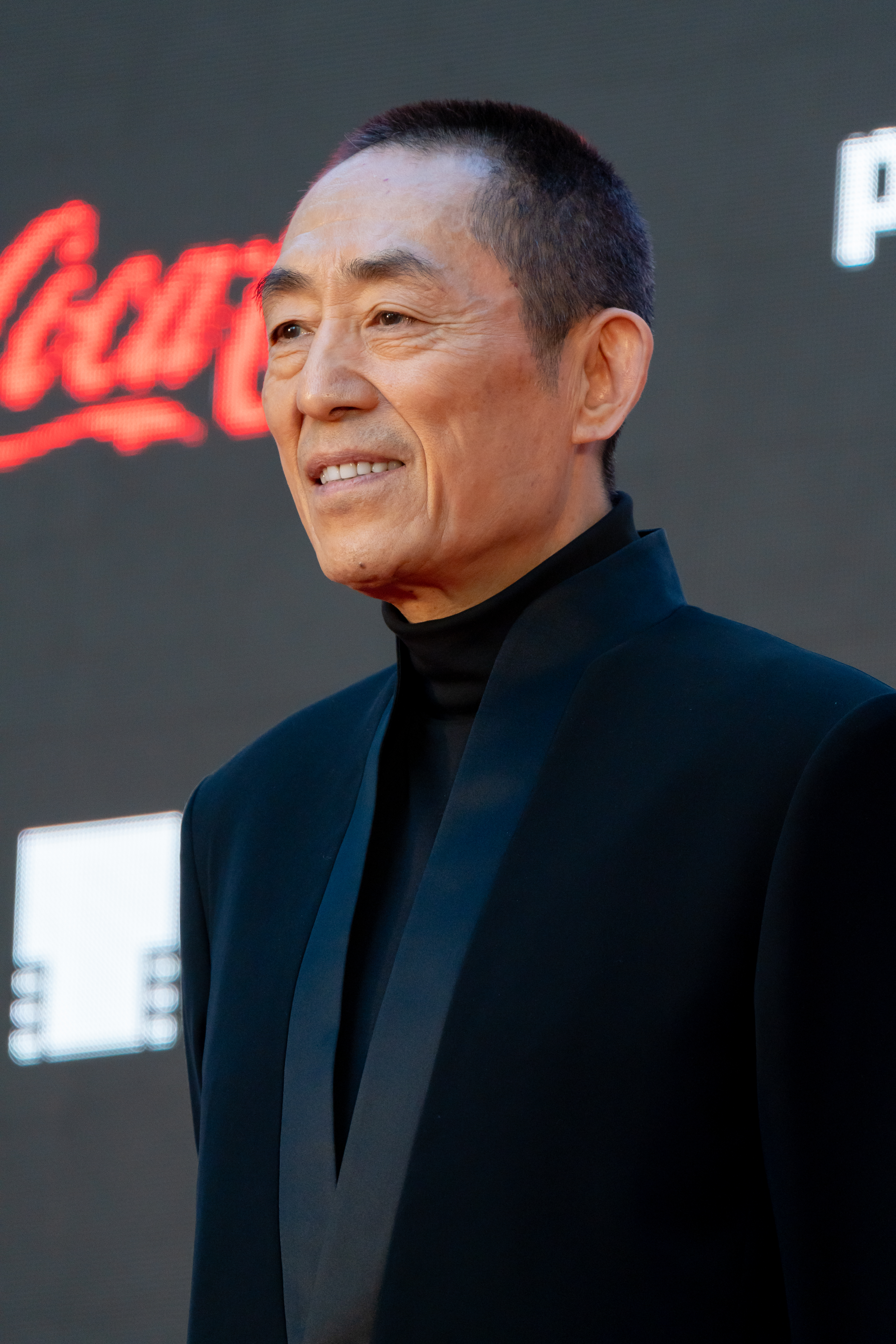
Zhang Yimou won for Red Sorghum (1988).

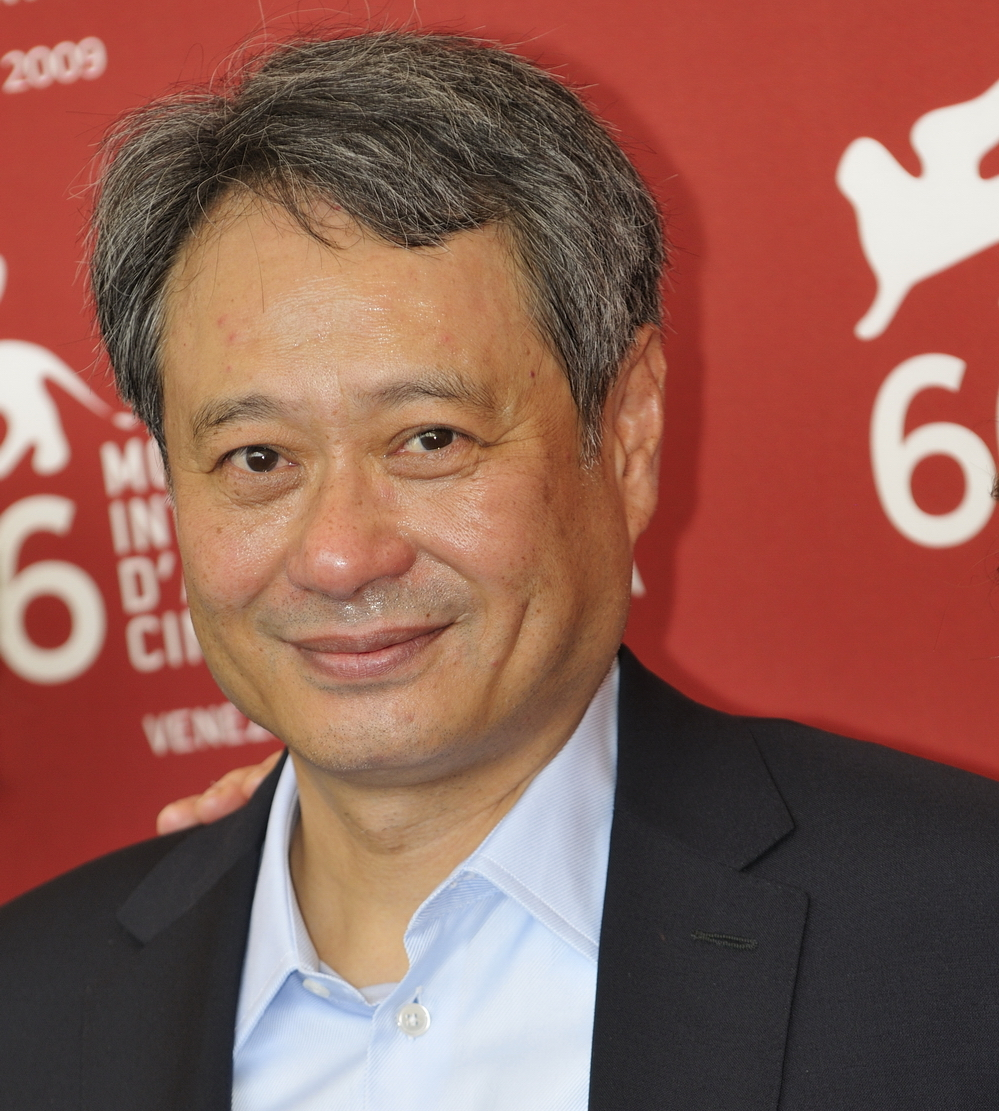
Ang Lee won twice for The Wedding Banquet (1993) and Sense and Sensibility (1996).

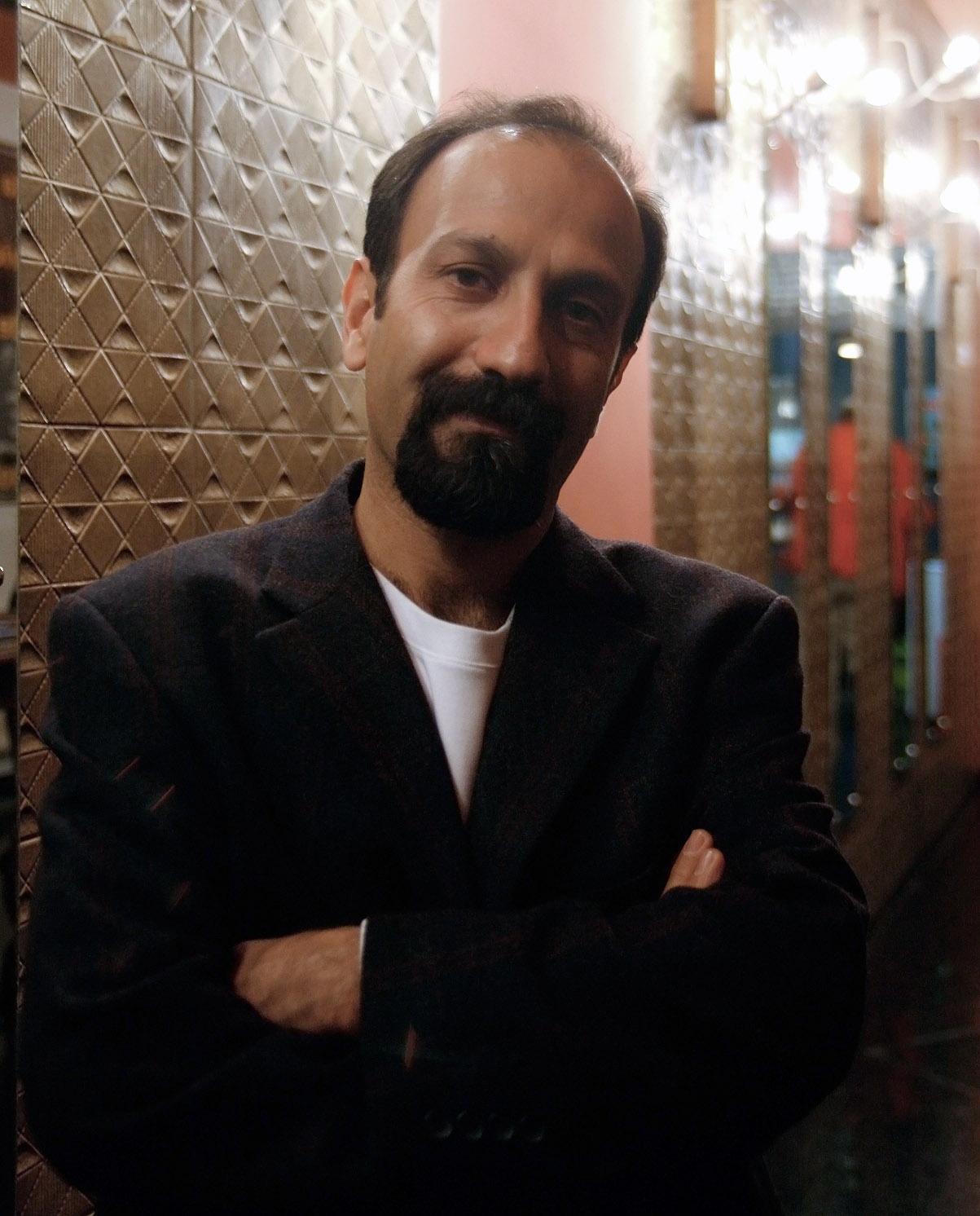
Asghar Farhadi won for A Separation (2011).

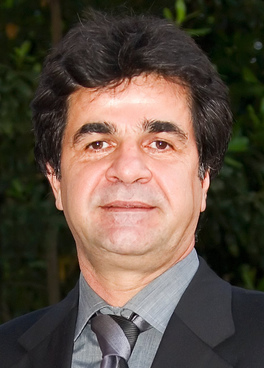
Jafar Panahi won for Taxi (2015).

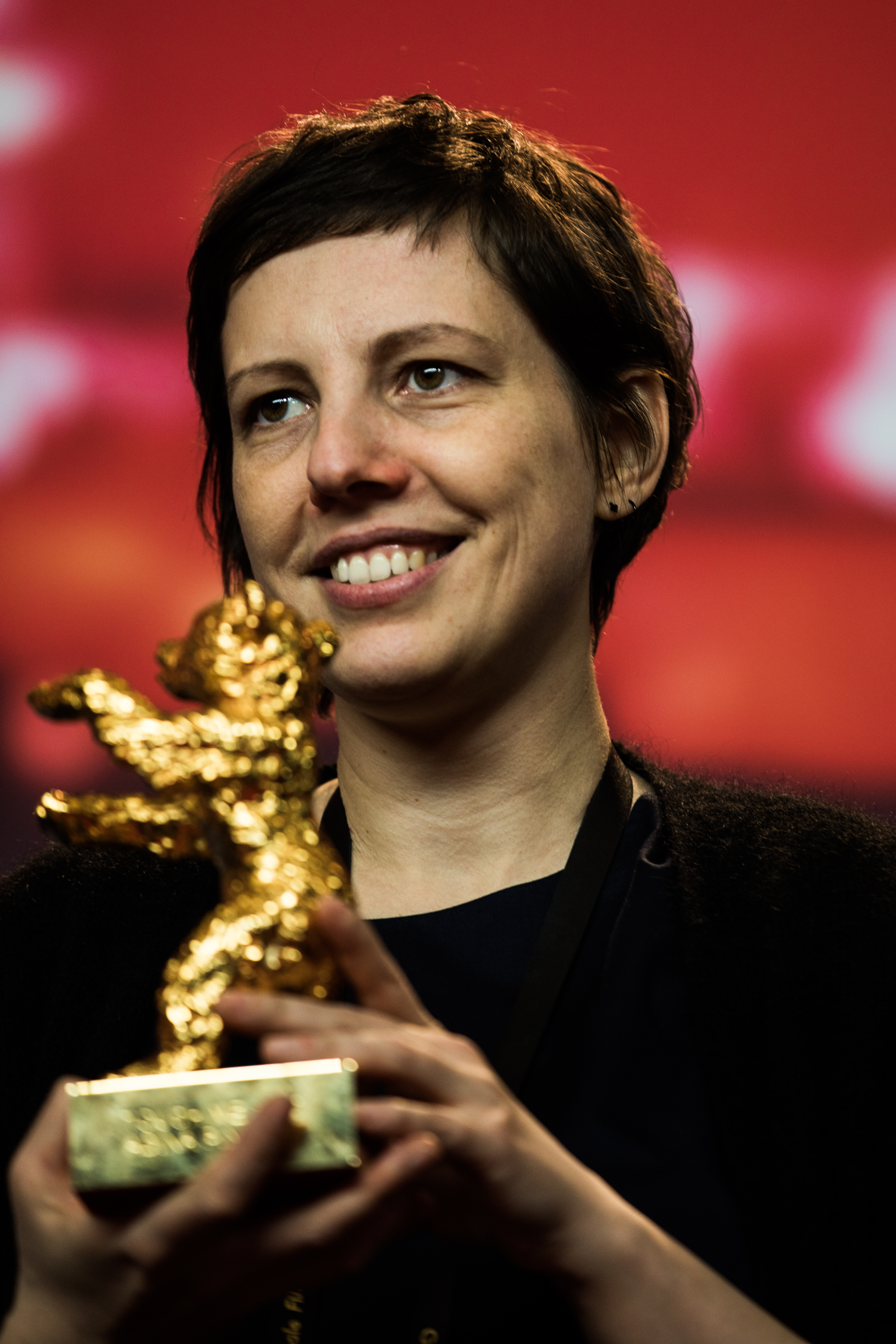
Adina Pintilie won for Touch Me Not (2018).

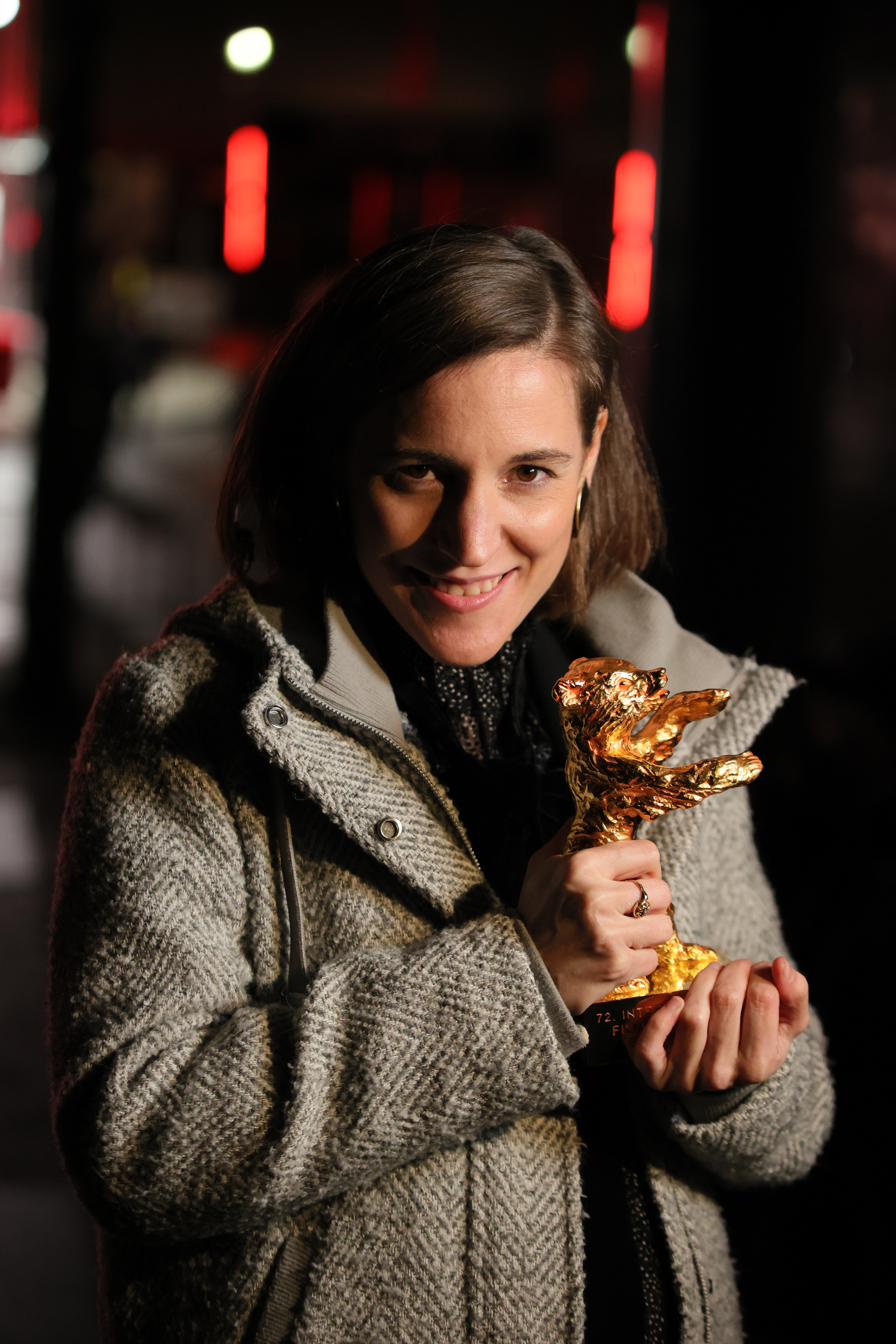
Carla Simón won for Alcarràs (2022).

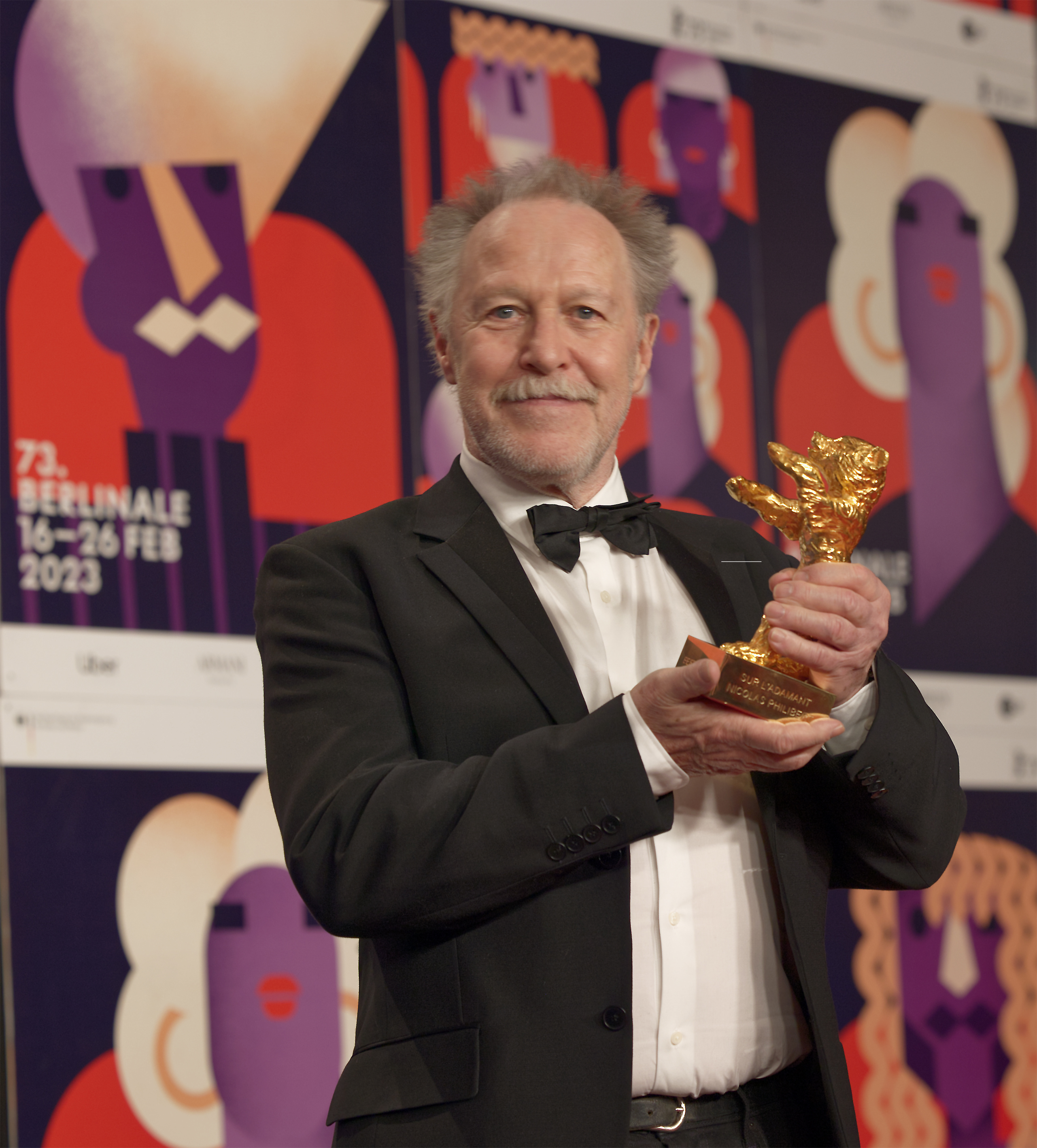
Nicolas Philibert won for On the Adamant (2023).

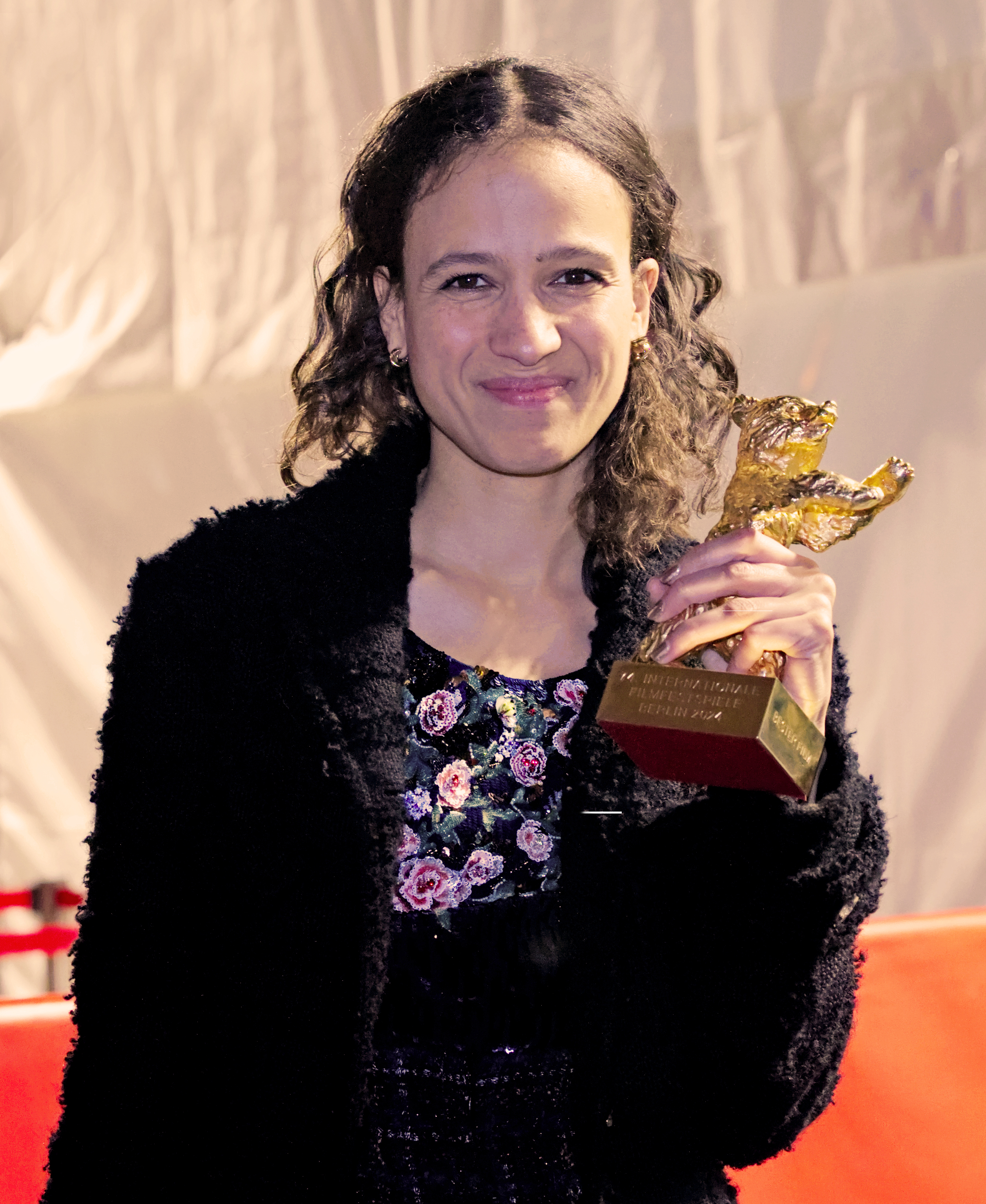
Mati Diop won for Dahomey (2024).

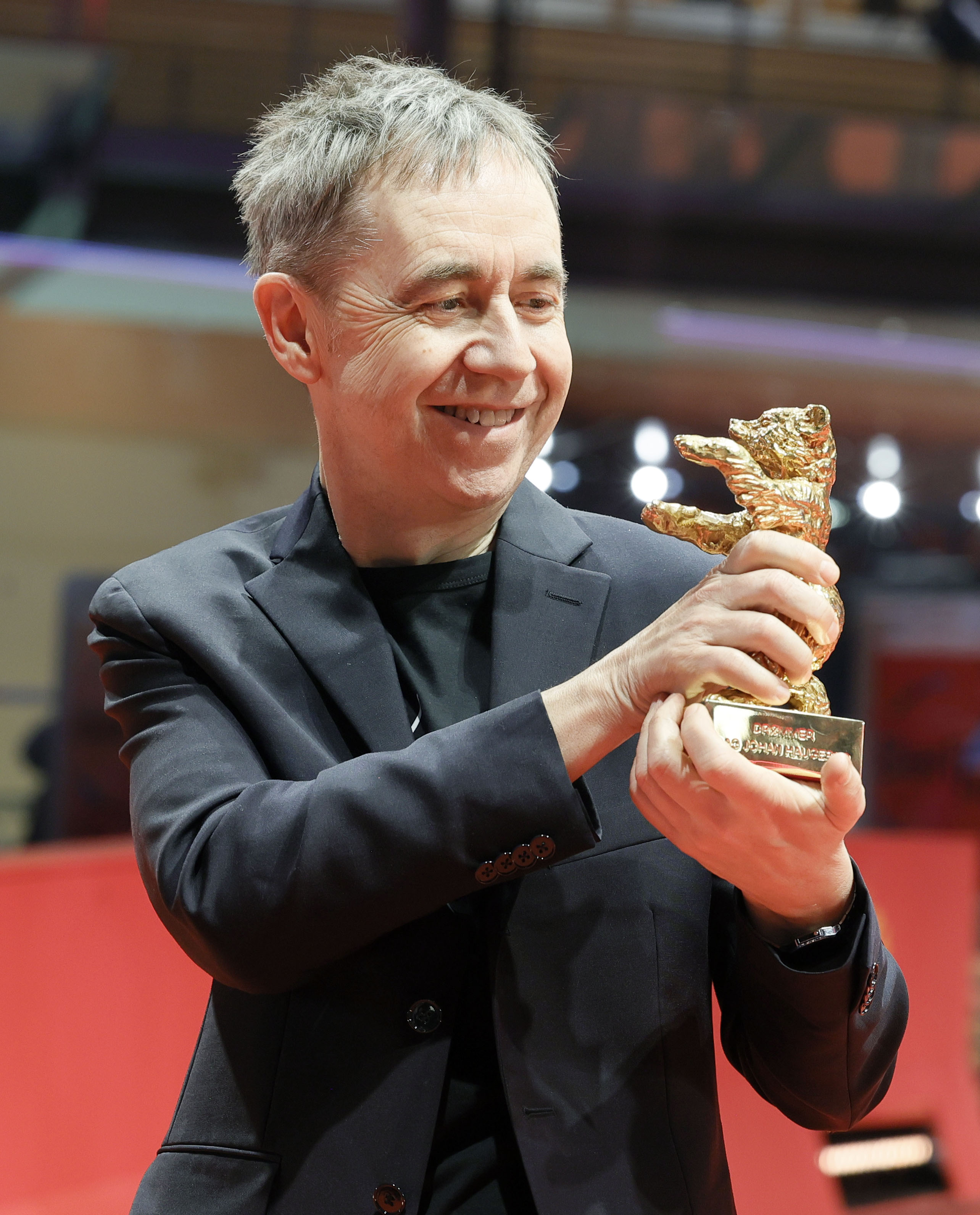
Dag Johan Haugerud won for Dreams (Sex Love) (2025).

Below is a list of all winners since 1951:

=== 1950s ===
Year	English title	Original title	Director(s)	Production country
1951	Four in a Jeep (Drama)	Die Vier im Jeep	Leopold Lindtberg	Switzerland
1951	Without Leaving an Address (Comedy)	...Sans laisser d'adresse	Jean-Paul Le Chanois	France
1951	In Beaver Valley (Documentary)		James Algar	United States
1951	Justice Is Done (Thriller & Adventure)	Justice est faite	André Cayatte	France
1951	Cinderella (Music Film)		Wilfred Jackson	United States
1952	One Summer of Happiness	Hon dansade en sommar	Arne Mattsson	Sweden
1953	The Wages of Fear	Le salaire de la peur	Henri-Georges Clouzot	France, Italy
1954	Hobson's Choice		David Lean	United Kingdom
1955	Die Ratten		Robert Siodmak	West Germany
1956	Invitation to the Dance		Gene Kelly	United States
1957	12 Angry Men		Sidney Lumet	United States
1958	Wild Strawberries	Smultronstället	Ingmar Bergman	Sweden
1959	Les Cousins		Claude Chabrol	France

=== 1960s ===
Year	English title	Original title	Director(s)	Production country
1960	El Lazarillo de Tormes		César Fernández Ardavín	Spain
1961	La Notte		Michelangelo Antonioni	Italy
1962	A Kind of Loving		John Schlesinger	United Kingdom
1963	Bushido, Samurai Saga	武士道残酷物語	Tadashi Imai	Japan
1963	To Bed or Not to Bed	Il diavolo	Gian Luigi Polidoro	Italy
1964	Dry Summer	Susuz Yaz	Metin Erksan	Turkey
1965	Alphaville	Alphaville, une étrange aventure de Lemmy Caution	Jean-Luc Godard	France, Italy
1966	Cul-de-Sac		Roman Polanski	United Kingdom
1967	Le Départ		Jerzy Skolimowski	Belgium
1968	Who Saw Him Die?	Ole dole doff	Jan Troell	Sweden
1969	Early Works	Rani radovi / Рани радови	Želimir Žilnik	Yugoslavia

=== 1970s ===
Year	English title	Original title	Director(s)	Production country
1970	No awards given because of the controversy surrounding Michael Verhoeven's anti-war film o.k. (Note: Which led to the resignation of the international jury before the end of the festival)			
1971	The Garden of the Finzi-Continis	Il giardino dei Finzi Contini	Vittorio De Sica	West Germany, Italy
1972	The Canterbury Tales	I racconti di Canterbury	Pier Paolo Pasolini	Italy
1973	Distant Thunder	অশনি সংকেত	Satyajit Ray	India
1974	The Apprenticeship of Duddy Kravitz		Ted Kotcheff	Canada
1975	Adoption	Örökbefogadás	Márta Mészáros	Hungary
1976	Buffalo Bill and the Indians, or Sitting Bull's History Lesson		Robert Altman	United States
1977	The Ascent	Восхождение	Larisa Shepitko	Soviet Union
1978	Ascensor		Tomás Muñoz	Spain
1978	Las truchas		José Luis García Sánchez	Spain
1978	What Max Said	Las palabras de Max	Emilio Martínez-Lázaro	Spain
1979	David		Peter Lilienthal	West Germany

=== 1980s ===
Year	English title	Original title	Director(s)	Production country
1980	Heartland		Richard Pearce	United States
1980	Palermo or Wolfsburg	Palermo oder Wolfsburg	Werner Schroeter	West Germany
1981	Deprisa, deprisa		Carlos Saura	Spain
1982	Veronika Voss	Die Sehnsucht der Veronika Voss	Rainer Werner Fassbinder	West Germany
1983	Ascendancy		Edward Bennett	United Kingdom
1983	La colmena		Mario Camus	Spain
1984	Love Streams		John Cassavetes	United States
1985	Wetherby		David Hare	United Kingdom
1985	The Woman and the Stranger	Die Frau und der Fremde	Rainer Simon	East Germany
1986	Stammheim	Stammheim – Die Baader-Meinhof-Gruppe vor Gericht	Reinhard Hauff	West Germany
1987	The Theme	Teмa	Gleb Panfilov	Soviet Union
1988	Red Sorghum	红高粱	Zhang Yimou	China
1989	Rain Man		Barry Levinson	United States

=== 1990s ===
Year	English title	Original title	Director(s)	Production country
1990	Larks on a String	Skřivánci na niti	Jiří Menzel	Czechoslovakia
1990	Music Box		Costa-Gavras	United States
1991	The House of Smiles	La casa del sorriso	Marco Ferreri	Italy
1992	Grand Canyon		Lawrence Kasdan	United States
1993	The Wedding Banquet	喜宴	Ang Lee	Taiwan, United States
1993	Woman Sesame Oil Maker	香魂女	Xie Fei	China
1994	In the Name of the Father		Jim Sheridan	United Kingdom, Ireland
1995	The Bait	L'appât	Bertrand Tavernier	France
1996	Sense and Sensibility		Ang Lee	United States
1997	The People vs. Larry Flynt		Miloš Forman	United States
1998	Central Station	Central do Brasil	Walter Salles	Brazil, France
1999	The Thin Red Line		Terrence Malick	United States

=== 2000s ===
Year	English title	Original title	Director(s)	Production country
2000	Magnolia		Paul Thomas Anderson	United States
2001	Intimacy		Patrice Chéreau	France
2002	Bloody Sunday		Paul Greengrass	United Kingdom, Ireland
2002	Spirited Away	千と千尋の神隠し	Hayao Miyazaki	Japan
2003	In This World		Michael Winterbottom	United Kingdom
2004	Head-On	Gegen die Wand	Fatih Akin	Germany, Turkey
2005	U-Carmen eKhayelitsha		Mark Dornford-May	South Africa
2006	Grbavica		Jasmila Žbanić	Bosnia and Herzegovina
2007	Tuya's Marriage	图雅的婚事	Wang Quan'an	China
2008	Elite Squad	Tropa de Elite	José Padilha	Brazil
2009	The Milk of Sorrow	La teta asustada	Claudia Llosa	Spain, Peru

=== 2010s ===
Year	English title	Original title	Director(s)	Production country
2010	Honey	Bal	Semih Kaplanoğlu	Turkey
2011	A Separation	جدایی نادر از سیمین	Asghar Farhadi	Iran
2012	Caesar Must Die	Cesare deve morire	Paolo and Vittorio Taviani	Italy
2013	Child's Pose	Poziția copilului	Călin Peter Netzer	Romania
2014	Black Coal, Thin Ice	白日焰火	Diao Yinan	China
2015	Taxi	تاکسی	Jafar Panahi	Iran
2016	Fire at Sea	Fuocoammare	Gianfranco Rosi	Italy
2017	On Body and Soul	Testről és lélekről	Ildikó Enyedi	Hungary
2018	Touch Me Not	Nu mă atinge-mă	Adina Pintilie	Romania
2019	Synonyms	Synonymes	Nadav Lapid	France, Israel

=== 2020s ===
Year	English title	Original title	Director(s)	Production country
2020	There Is No Evil	شیطان وجود ندارد	Mohammad Rasoulof	Iran
2021	Bad Luck Banging or Loony Porn	Babardeală cu bucluc sau porno balamuc	Radu Jude	Romania
2022	Alcarràs		Carla Simón	Spain, Italy
2023	On the Adamant	Sur l'Adamant	Nicolas Philibert	France, Japan
2024	Dahomey		Mati Diop	France, Senegal, Benin
2025	Dreams (Sex Love)	Drømmer	Dag Johan Haugerud	Norway
2026	Yellow Letters	Gelbe Briefe	İlker Çatak	Germany, France, Turkey

== Multiple winners ==
As of 2025, Ang Lee is the only filmmaker to win the award twice, for The Wedding Banquet in 1993 and for Sense and Sensibility in 1996.

== See also ==
- Honorary Golden Bear
- Silver Bear and other awards at the Berlin International Film Festival
- Palme d'Or, the highest prize awarded at the Cannes Film Festival
- Golden Lion, the highest prize awarded at the Venice Film Festival
