= Four in a Jeep =

1951 film

- Film poster
- Directed by: Leopold Lindtberg; Elizabeth Montagu
- Written by: Richard Schweizer
- Produced by: Lazar Wechsler
- Starring: Ralph Meeker; Viveca Lindfors; Yoseph Yadin; Michael Medwin; Albert Dinan
- Cinematography: Emil Berna
- Edited by: Hermann Haller; Paula Dvorak
- Release date: 1951
- Running time: 102 minutes
- Country: Switzerland
- Languages: English; German

Four in a Jeep (German: Die Vier im Jeep) is a 1951 Swiss drama film directed by Leopold Lindtberg and Elizabeth Montagu. Set in occupied Vienna after the Second World War, it follows an international military patrol drawn into the case of an Austrian fugitive and his wife. The film won the Golden Bear in the drama category at the 1st Berlin International Film Festival and the United Nations Award at the 5th British Academy Film Awards.

== Synopsis ==
Set in occupied Vienna after the Second World War, the film follows an international military patrol confronted with the case of the wife of an Austrian who has escaped Soviet captivity. As the patrol debates whether and how to help her, one of the Soviet soldiers ultimately chooses to look the other way.

== Cast ==
The cast includes:

- Ralph Meeker as William Long
- Yoseph Yadin as Wassilij Voroschenko
- Viveca Lindfors as Franziska Idinger
- Michael Medwin as Harry Stuart
- Hans Putz as Karl Idinger
- Albert Dinan as Marcel Pasture
- Harry Hess as Hauptmann Hammon

== Production ==
Despite its international cast, the film was a wholly Swiss production. Leopold Lindtberg filmed in his native Vienna, where he used concealment measures because of fears of intervention by the occupying powers. Most exterior scenes were shot in Graz.

== Reception ==
At the 1st Berlin International Film Festival, Four in a Jeep won the Golden Bear in the drama category. It also won the United Nations Award at the 5th British Academy Film Awards. The film was screened in competition at the 1951 Cannes Film Festival. Its portrayal of the Soviet soldier prompted protests from the Soviet delegation at Cannes. Recognition at Berlin and Cannes boosted Praesens-Film’s prestige despite a Soviet boycott.

== Legacy ==
As of 2022, Four in a Jeep remained the only Swiss film to have won the Golden Bear at the Berlin International Film Festival.
