= Justice Is Done =

1950 film

- French Poster
- Directed by: André Cayatte
- Written by: André Cayatte (screenplay); Charles Spaak (dialogue & screenplay)
- Produced by: Robert Dorfmann
- Starring: Valentine Tessier
- Cinematography: Jean Bourgoin
- Edited by: Christian Gaudin
- Music by: Raymond Legrand
- Distributed by: Coronis (France); Joseph Burstyn Inc. (US)
- Release dates: 20 September 1950 (France); 2 March 1953 (US)
- Running time: 95 minutes
- Country: France
- Language: French

Justice Is Done (French: Justice est faite) is a 1950 French drama film directed by André Cayatte, a former lawyer turned filmmaker, as part of his series examining law, justice, and societal morality in post-war France. It tackles the subject of euthanasia by depicting a court case in which a woman is tried for killing her terminally ill employer at his request. The film shows that all members of the jury are somehow prejudiced because of personal life experience and subsequently each member reads something different into the presented facts.

The film won the Golden Lion at the Venice Film Festival in 1950 and Golden Bear (Thrillers and Adventures) at the 1st Berlin International Film Festival in 1951. It was shot at the Saint-Maurice Studios in Paris and on location around Versailles, Marly-le-Roi, Hérouville and Arronville. The film's sets were designed by the art director Jacques Colombier.

== Plot ==
The film opens with a voice-over narration explaining the French judicial system, particularly the role of citizen jurors in assize courts. It then shows the process of selecting seven jurors for a murder trial at the Versailles Court of Assizes. The jurors are ordinary people from diverse backgrounds: Gilbert de Montesson (Jacques Castelot), a successful businessman dealing with marital infidelity; Théodore Andrieux (Noël Roquevert), a conservative farmer and war veteran with strong Christian and patriotic views; Marceline Micoulin (Valentine Tessier), a middle-class housewife struggling with family obligations; Jean-Luc Flavier (Jean-Pierre Grenier), a young intellectual and teacher facing financial difficulties; Félix Noblet (Raymond Bussières), a working-class waiter with a history of personal losses; Eguermont, a retired pharmacist haunted by his wife's prolonged illness; and Michel Beaumont, a reserved engineer with recent experiences of betrayal. Each juror's summons interrupt their daily lives, revealed through brief flashbacks.

The trial begins under President of the Court, played by Antoine Balpêtré, who oversees the proceedings with stern impartiality. The accused, Elsa Lundenstein (Claude Nollier), a pharmacist of foreign origin, stands trial for the premeditated murder of her husband, Roland Lundenstein, a prominent pharmaceutical laboratory director suffering from advanced cancer. Elsa admits to injecting him with a fatal dose of morphine but insists it was at his repeated pleas to end his unbearable pain, as he had begged her during his final days in agony.

The prosecution, led by the advocate general, presents evidence suggesting ulterior motives. Roland's sister, Élisabeth de Sutter, testifies that Elsa was having an affair with Dr. Jean-Pierre Grenier, a colleague, and stood to inherit a significant fortune from Roland's estate. Witnesses include the family maid, Agnès Deluca, who overheard arguments about money; the social worker Mlle Point, who describes Elsa's composed demeanor after the death; and the pharmacist M. Point, who confirms the morphine was obtained legally but in excess. Medical experts debate the ethics of euthanasia, with one doctor affirming Roland's terminal state and another questioning if the dose was truly merciful or calculated.

The defense attorney counters by emphasizing Elsa's devotion, calling witnesses like the priest who counseled the couple and a nurse colleague who saw Roland's suffering. Elsa takes the stand, tearfully recounting Roland's deterioration—his coughing fits, weight loss, and pleas for release—and her internal conflict before fulfilling his wish one night in their home.

As the trial unfolds over several days, the jurors observe from the box, their reactions shaped by personal parallels. During recesses, they discuss informally: Théodore condemns euthanasia as against God's will, drawing from his religious upbringing; Eguermont sympathizes, recalling his wife's similar pleas; Gilbert suspects infidelity as the real motive, mirroring his own marital issues; Marceline wavers, thinking of maternal compassion.

After closing arguments, the jury retires to deliberate in a tense room. Initial votes are split: four for guilty, three for not guilty. Heated debates ensue. Théodore argues for conviction, citing moral law and Elsa's foreign background as suspicious. Félix shares a story of his brother's painful death, swaying toward acquittal. Jean-Luc analyzes the evidence logically, pointing out ambiguities in motives. Michel reveals his ex-wife's affair, initially biasing him against Elsa but leading to empathy. Eguermont's emotional recount of his wife's end tips the balance. After multiple rounds, they reach a majority verdict of not guilty, acquitting Elsa on grounds of compassionate intent rather than malice.

Elsa is released, embracing her lawyer amid courtroom murmurs. As the jurors disperse—Gilbert returns to his strained marriage, Théodore to his farm, and others to their routines—a final voice-over by the narrator reflects on the subjectivity of justice, noting how different circumstances might have altered the outcome, leaving the true nature of Elsa's act ambiguous in the eyes of the law.

== Cast ==
- Michel Auclair as Serge Cremer
- Antoine Balpêtré as Le président du tribunal (as Balpétré)
- Raymond Bussières as Félix Noblet, le 5ème juré
- Jacques Castelot as Gilbert de Montesson, le 1er juré
- Jean Debucourt as Michel Caudron, le 7ème juré (as Jean Debucourt Sociétaire de la Comédie Française)
- Jean-Pierre Grenier as Jean-Luc Flavier, le 3ème juré (as J.P. Grenier)
- Claude Nollier as Elsa Lundenstein (as Claude Nollier de la Comédie Française)
- Marcel Pérès as Évariste Malingré, le 2ème juré (as Marcel Perès)
- Noël Roquevert as Théodore Andrieux, le 6ème juré
- Valentine Tessier as Marceline Micoulin, le 4ème juré
- Jean d'Yd as Le père supérieur
- Agnès Delahaie as Nicole Vaudrémont
- Cécile Didier as Mademoiselle Popélier, l'hôtelière
- Juliette Faber as Danièle Andrieux
- Anouk Ferjac as Denise
- Dita Parlo as Elisabeth

== Reception ==
Upon release, Justice Is Done received international acclaim for its exploration of legal and moral themes, winning the Golden Lion at the 1950 Venice Film Festival, and the Golden Bear (Thrillers and Adventures) at the1st Berlin International Film Festival in 1951. The film is part of André Cayatte's series of works in the early 1950s that address various aspects of the French judicial system, denouncing perceived wrongs and bringing him international recognition.

The New York Times review by Bosley Crowther hailed it as a "crisp and absorbing demonstration" of human responses to moral dilemmas, emphasizing its social irony and questioning whether true justice is achieved. Crowther praised the film's direction and acting for their skill in character portrayal, with standout performances by Marcel Pérès, Raymond Bussières, Noël Roquevert, and Valentine Tessier. However, André Bazin critiqued Cayatte's approach in films like this as overly thesis-driven, prioritizing ideological messaging over cinematic subtlety, as noted in his essay on forgotten French filmmakers. François Truffaut, in his 1954 manifesto “A Certain Tendency of the French Cinema,” indirectly referenced Cayatte as part of the “Tradition of Quality” he criticized for its formulaic, scriptwriter-dominated style. Filmmaker David Cairns appreciated its intelligent exploration of bias in judgment, comparing it to Twelve Angry Men while noting its less romanticized view of justice.

== Awards ==
Justice Is Done is the first film to win two out of three highest prizes from the "Big Three" major international film festivals, including the Golden Bear and the Golden Lion. The second, and so far only other film, is The Wages of Fear.

Wins

- 1st Berlin International Film Festival – Golden Bear (Thrillers and Adventures)
- 11th Venice International Film Festival – Golden Lion
