= Rolf Hansen (director) =

German film director

- Born: 12 December 1904; Ilmenau, German Empire
- Died: 3 December 1990 (aged 85); Munich, Germany
- Occupation: Film director
- Years active: 1936–1960

Rolf Hansen (12 December 1904 – 3 December 1990) was a German film director. He directed 20 films between 1936 and 1960.

== Selected filmography ==
- The Way to Freedom (1941)
- The Great Love (1942)
- Back Then (1943)
- Vagabonds (1949)
- Dr. Holl (1950)
- The White Hell of Pitz Palu (1950)
- Desires (1952)
- The Great Temptation (1952)
- The Life of Surgeon Sauerbruch (1954)
- Beloved Enemy (1955)
- Devil in Silk (1956)
- The Last Ones Shall Be First (1957)
- And Lead Us Not Into Temptation (1957)
- Resurrection (1958)
- Gustav Adolf's Page (1960)
