= Albert Michel =

French actor (1909–1981)

- Michel in Le deuxième souffle (1966)
- Born: 3 October 1909; Nancy, Meurthe-et-Moselle, France
- Died: 6 July 1981 (aged 71); Paris, France
- Occupation: Actor
- Years active: 1938-1982 (film & TV)

Albert Michel (3 October 1909 – 6 July 1981) was a French stage, film and television actor.

== Selected filmography ==
- Je chante (1938) - Un laitier (uncredited)
- Ne bougez plus (1941) - Clanpinet
- Chèque au porteur (1941)
- Fièvres (1942)
- Croisières sidérales (1942) - Un employé au commissariat (uncredited)
- Pontcarral (1942)
- Haut le vent (1942) - Un passager du bateau
- Love Story (1943) - (uncredited)
- Voyage Without Hope (1943) - Un membre d'équipage (uncredited)
- La vie de plaisir (1944) - Un écclésiastique (uncredited)
- Le bossu (1944)
- François Villon (1945) - Le paysan accusé
- Sylvie et le fantôme (1946) - Gabriel (uncredited)
- Jericho (1946) - Le correspondent qui vient de Hollande
- Les J3 (1946)
- Trente et quarante (1946) - Le voyageur bègue dans le train
- Mensonges (1946) - Le greffier de la prison
- The Sea Rose (1946) - Un mécanicien
- Nuits d'alerte (1946) - (uncredited)
- A Lover's Return (1946) - Le pompier de service (uncredited)
- Six Hours to Lose (1947) - Le porteur
- Man About Town (1947) - Zanzi
- Devil in the Flesh (1947) - Le vendeur de chambres à coucher
- Naughty Martine (1947) - Gustave
- Last Chance Castle (1947) - L'habilleur
- A Cop (1947) - Albert
- Third at Heart (1947) - Bastien
- Danger de mort (1947) - Un employé à la gare (uncredited)
- D'homme à hommes (1948) - Le portier (uncredited)
- Croisière pour l'inconnu (1948) - Le bosco
- L'assassin est à l'écoute (1948) - Le pompier (uncredited)
- Monelle (1948) - Le chef de bureau (uncredited)
- City of Hope (1948) - Le père La Fraise
- The Cupboard Was Bare (1948) - Un agent (uncredited)
- Jean de la Lune (1949) - Le monsieur tamponné (uncredited)
- Fantomas Against Fantomas (1949) - Un agent (uncredited)
- L'échafaud peut attendre (1949) - L'infirmier
- Jo la Romance (1949) - Le valet de chambre
- La bataille du feu (1949) - Un conseiller
- The Cupid Club (1949) - Le gardien
- Je n'aime que toi... (1949) - Un garçon de café du Négresco (uncredited)
- Thus Finishes the Night (1949) - Le contrôleur
- Barry (1949) - Un moine (uncredited)
- Keep an Eye on Amelia (1949) - Un spectateur
- Mademoiselle de la Ferté (1949) - Le facteur
- Vient de paraître (1949) - Un journaliste
- Eve and the Serpent (1949) - Le valet de chambre
- The King (1949) - Un inspecteur
- La souricière (1950) - Un prévenu (uncredited)
- Wedding Night (1950) - L'inspecteur
- Le 84 prend des vacances (1950) - Le représentant en aspirateurs
- My Friend Sainfoin (1950) - Le garçon
- Prelude to Glory (1950) - Le coiffeur
- Rendez-vous avec la chance (1950) - Le contrôleur SNCF
- Cartouche, King of Paris (1950) - L'espion
- Justice Is Done (1950) - Le gendarme porteur de la convocation (uncredited)
- God Needs Men (1950) - Le Bail
- Three Telegrams (1950) - Le cafetier
- The King of the Bla Bla Bla (1950) - Charlie
- The Glass Castle (1950) - Le charmeur d'oiseaux
- Without Leaving an Address (1951) - Monsieur Marpin - un futur papa
- Tomorrow We Get Divorced (1951) - Le valet de chambre
- My Seal and Them (1951) - Le poissonnier
- The Little Cardinals (1951) - Le gendarme
- Shadow and Light (1951) - Le patron
- Le plus joli péché du monde (1951) - Le domestique (uncredited)
- Coq en pâte (1951)
- Gibier de potence (1951) - Antoine (uncredited)
- The Cape of Hope (1951) - Un joueur de cartes
- Alone in Paris (1951) - Le 1er employé du commissariat
- Paris Still Sings (1951) - Un agent (uncredited)
- Jocelyn (1952)
- My Wife, My Cow and Me (1952)
- Matrimonial Agency (1952) - Le pêcheur (uncredited)
- Drôle de noce (1952) - Le fils Cornil
- Brelan d'as (1952) - Le brigadier (segment "Les témoignages d'un enfant de choeur")
- Beauties of the Night (1952) - Le facteur / Un révolutionnaire
- The Moment of Truth (1952) - Le second comédien en tournée
- Rayés des vivants (1952)
- The Last Robin Hood (1953) - Un gendarme
- Le témoin de minuit (1953) - Minor rôle (uncredited)
- Follow That Man (1953) - Le contrôleur de la prison
- Innocents in Paris (1953) - Traffic Officer (uncredited)
- I Vinti (1953) - Le père de Georges (uncredited)
- The Earrings of Madame de… (1953) - Le second cocher du baron (uncredited)
- Virgile (1953) - Trouillard
- My Brother from Senegal (1953) - Le gendarme de la route (uncredited)
- Daughters of Destiny (1954) - Un moine (segment "Jeanne")
- Royal Affairs in Versailles (1954) - Un citoyen (uncredited)
- The Unfrocked One (1954) - Le prêtre qui absout Madame Morand
- Les révoltés de Lomanach (1954) - Le soldat qui se rase (uncredited)
- Le Secret d'Hélène Marimon (1954) - Le soldat convalescent
- The Lovers of Marianne (1954) - Un villageois
- The Bed (1954) - Un déménageur (segment "Le lit de la Pompadour") (uncredited)
- The Sheep Has Five Legs (1954) - Le patron du bistrot
- Service Entrance (1954) - Le sacristain - ami de Grimaldi
- Obsession (1954) - Le réptionniste de l'hôtel rouennais
- The Red and the Black (1954) - Le sonneur (uncredited)
- Papa, Mama, the Maid and I (1954) - Le souffleur à la représentation
- Le fil à la patte (1954) - Jean - le domestique du comte
- Le vicomte de Bragelonne (1954) - Le gardien (uncredited)
- Casse-cou, mademoiselle! (1955)
- Caroline and the Rebels (1955) - Le fonctionnaire de la prison (uncredited)
- Men in White (1955) - Un paysan
- Les évadés (1955) - Un prisonnier
- Papa, maman, ma femme et moi (1955) - L'employé S.N.C.F. (uncredited)
- The Impossible Mr. Pipelet (1955) - Le capitaine des pompiers
- The Little Rebels (1955) - L'agriculteur voisin demandant l'échelle
- Gas-Oil (1955) - Le facteur
- La Madelon (1955) - Isidore (uncredited)
- The Affair of the Poisons (1955) - Gobet
- Impasse des vertus (1955) - L'hôtelier
- On déménage le colonel (1955) - Un gendarme
- If Paris Were Told to Us (1956) - Jacques Michel / Un Consommateur (uncredited)
- La Bande à papa (1956) - L'adjudant des pompiers (uncredited)
- Le secret de soeur Angèle (1956) - Un infirmier
- Meeting in Paris (1956) - Le serrurier (uncredited)
- Le sang à la tête (1956) - Duleux, le chef de gare (uncredited)
- Fernand cow-boy (1956) - Le geôlier
- La Traversée de Paris (1956) - Le concierge de la rue de Turenne (uncredited)
- Suspicion (1956) - Le garde chasse
- The Hunchback of Notre Dame (1956) - Night Watchman
- L'amour descend du ciel (1957) - L'agent de police
- Speaking of Murder (1957) - L'employé du garage (uncredited)
- Fric-frac en dentelles (1957)
- Vacances explosives! (1957) - Le camionneur qui transporte le tableau
- Les Lavandières du Portugal (1957) - Un peintre
- Comme un cheveu sur la soupe (1957) - L'employé du gaz
- La polka des menottes (1957) - Abadie - l'agent du commissariat
- Gates of Paris (1957) - L'épicier (uncredited)
- Anyone Can Kill Me (1957) - Le gardien-brigadier Bricart
- Maigret Sets a Trap (1958) - Le gardien de prison (uncredited)
- La Tour, prends garde ! (1958) - Un invité de Taupin (uncredited)
- Police judiciaire (1958) - Le chauffeur de bus témoin (uncredited)
- Back to the Wall (1958) - Le concierge (uncredited)
- Le temps des oeufs durs (1958) - M. Charretier, le concierge
- En bordée (1958)
- In Case of Adversity (1958) - Eugène - le patron du bazar (uncredited)
- Madame et son auto (1958)
- Sins of Youth (1958) - Un joueur de billiard
- Le Sicilien (1958) - Le barman
- Suivez-moi jeune homme (1958)
- Serenade of Texas (1958) - Albert - l'employé du magasin
- Les motards (1959) - Le facteur myope
- The Big Chief (1959) - Le voisin d'en face
- Too Late to Love (1959) - Un gendarme (uncredited)
- Le gendarme de Champignol (1959) - Le geôlier (uncredited)
- Soupe au lait (1959) - Un collègue
- Babette Goes to War (1959) - Le fuyard (uncredited)
- La marraine de Charley (1959) - Gaston
- The Cat Shows Her Claws (1960) - Un cheminot
- The Baron of the Locks (1960) - Un client de l'auberge
- Le 7eme jour de Saint-Malo (1960)
- Women Are Like That (1960) - Le brigadier au cabaret
- The Old Guard (1960) - Le fils Goujon
- Love and the Frenchwoman (1960) - (segment "Le Mariage")
- The Gigolo (1960) - Le poissonnier (uncredited)
- Le mouton (1960) - Le dîneur bousculé par Fernand
- La Vérité (1960) - Un journaliste (uncredited)
- Le caïd (1960) - Filâtre
- Boulevard (1960) - Gaston Duriez
- Les Tortillards (1960) - Le garde-champêtre
- Five Day Lover (1961) - Blanchet
- The President (1961) - Un gendarme
- Les livreurs (1961)
- Le cave se rebiffe (1961) - Le facteur
- All the Gold in the World (1961) - Le maire de Cabosse
- Le Tracassin (1961) - L'homme à la clinique qui sert du calva à André
- The Seven Deadly Sins (1962) - Le suisse à l'église (segment "Gourmandise, La") (uncredited)
- The Devil and the Ten Commandments (1962) - Le maraîcher / Truck Farmer (segment "Dien en vain ne jureras")
- The Gentleman from Epsom (1962) - Un joueur (uncredited)
- Le couteau dans la plaie (1962)
- Mandrin (1962)
- Three Fables of Love (1962) - Un collègue de Charles
- Les Bricoleurs (1963) - Le portier de l'agence immobilière (uncredited)
- Seul... à corps perdu (1963)
- Les vierges (1963) - Le pique-assiette
- Heaven Sent (1963) - Un sacristain
- Maigret Sees Red (1963) - Le concierge de l'hôtel (uncredited)
- À toi de faire... mignonne (1963)
- Dandelions by the Roots (1964) - Un joueur de tiercé (uncredited)
- Une souris chez les hommes (1964) - Le caissier du 'Bon Marché'
- Behold a Pale Horse (1964) - (uncredited)
- Male Companion (1964) - Monsieur Leroux (uncredited)
- Ces dames s'en mêlent (1965) - Policeman (uncredited)
- Le Majordome (1965) - Le curé (uncredited)
- La grosse caisse (1965) - Le chef de station (uncredited)
- Marie-Chantal contre le docteur Kha (1965) - (uncredited)
- The Sleeping Car Murders (1965) - Le patron du bistrot (uncredited)
- How to Keep the Red Lamp Burning (1965) - Le greffier (segment "Le procès")
- Dis-moi qui tuer (1965) - Le portier
- Thunderball (1965) - Priest at Bouvar's Funeral (uncredited)
- Le caïd de Champignol (1966) - Un paysan
- Une femme en blanc se révolte (1966)
- The Gardener of Argenteuil (1966) - Le patron du bistro
- Le deuxième souffle (1966) - Marcel le Stéphanois
- Les compagnons de la marguerite (1967) - Le charcutier
- Two for the Road (1967) - Customs Officer (uncredited)
- Action Man (1967) - Gaston
- Les risques du métier (1967) - Le contremaître Lucien Canet
- Les cracks (1968) - (uncredited)
- Ne jouez pas avec les Martiens (1968)
- The Return of Monte Cristo (1968) - Le gardien du cimetière (uncredited)
- The Night of the Following Day (1969) - Taxi driver (uncredited)
- Under the Sign of the Bull (1969) - Le bistrot des ferrailleurs
- L'auvergnat et l'autobus (1969) - L'hôtelier (uncredited)
- Les gros malins (1969) - Le patron du bistrot
- Army of Shadows (1969) - Gendarm
- Give Her the Moon (1970) - Le président du jury
- Elise, or Real Life (1970) - Un ouvrier au café
- L'âne de Zigliara (1970) - Le curé
- Un peu de soleil dans l'eau froide (1970) - (uncredited)
- Chut! (1972) - Le brigadier
- Projection privée (1973) - Le concierge de Denis
- Un amour de pluie (1974) - Le client du café
- Par ici la monnaie (1974)
- Black Thursday (1974) - Le plombier / Plumber
- Couche-moi dans le sable et fais jaillir ton pétrole... (1975) - Constantin, le percepteur
- Opération Lady Marlène (1975) - Un concierge
- L'évasion de Hassan Terro (1976)
- Scrambled Eggs (1976)
- Mimì Bluette... fiore del mio giardino (1976)
- The Wing or the Thigh (1976) - M. Morand - un employé de Duchemin
- Bartleby (1976) - Le cuisinier de la prison
- Le Gang (1977) - Le photographe
- Dis bonjour à la dame!.. (1977) - Le vieil ami de Robert à a fête
- Julie pot-de-colle (1977) - Un passager du train
- Le maestro (1977) - Le chauffeur de taxi
- L'imprécateur (1977)
- La Menace (1977) - Grocery Owner
- That Night in Varennes (1982) - (final film role)

== Bibliography ==
- Ann C. Paietta. Saints, Clergy and Other Religious Figures on Film and Television, 1895–2003. McFarland, 2005.
