= Nana (1955 film) =

1955 films

- Directed by: Christian-Jaque
- Written by: Christian-Jaque
- Screenplay by: Jean Ferry; Albert Valentin; Henri Jeanson; Christian Jaque
- Based on: Nana by Émile Zola
- Produced by: Jacques Roitfeld
- Starring: Charles Boyer; Martine Carol
- Cinematography: Christian Matras
- Edited by: Jacques Desagneaux
- Music by: Georges Van Parys
- Color process: Eastmancolor
- Production companies: Les Productions Jacques Roitfeld; Cigno Film
- Distributed by: La Société des Films Sirius
- Release date: 26 July 1955
- Running time: 120 minutes
- Countries: France; Italy
- Language: French

Nana is a 1955 French-Italian historical drama film directed by Christian-Jaque and starring Martine Carol and Charles Boyer. An adaptation of the 1880 novel Nana by Émile Zola, it tells the story of two French aristocrats who are fatally ruined by their obsession for Nana, a mediocre actress and prostitute. Using the ancient theme of a worthless woman beguiling powerful men, the film portrays the moral corruption of the nominally Catholic court and nobility under the Second Empire. It was shot at the Billancourt Studios in Paris and filmed in Eastmancolor. The film's sets were designed by the art director Robert Gys.

== Plot ==
Nana, who appears nightly at a downmarket Parisian theatre where her impudence and the scantiness of her costumes make up for her lack of dramatic talent, supplements her income by assignations with admirers. She catches the eye of Muffat, a faithful Catholic husband who is a trusted aide of the Emperor. By perseverance and heavy expenditure, he makes her his exclusive mistress in a palatial private residence. His wife leaves him, his daughter's fiancé breaks off their engagement, and his fortune has gone.

Vandeuvres, his most persistent rival, imports a promising filly and bets heavily on her first race. Sure of a major coup, he persuades Nana to join him at the railway station for Italy. The horse wins and Nana starts packing her bags but, when the stewards find that the losing horse was doped, Vandeuvres commits suicide. Going round to Nana's mansion, Muffat finds her about to depart and, when she says she is leaving him for Vandeuvres, he strangles her.

== Cast ==
- Charles Boyer as Count Muffat
- Martine Carol as Nana
- Walter Chiari as Fontan
- Paul Frankeur as Bordenave
- Elisa Cegani as Countess Muffat
- Jean Debucourt as Napoléon III (as Jean Debubucourt de la Comédie Française)
- Marguerite Pierry as Zoé
- Dario Michaelis as Fauchery
- Dora Doll as Rose Mignon
- Palau as Venot (as Pierre Palau)
- Luisella Boni as Estelle
- Jacqueline Plessis as Impératrice Eugénie
- Germaine Kerjean as La Tricon
- Nerio Bernardi as Prince de Sardaigne
- Jacques Tarride as Mignon
- Nicole Riche as Marguerite Bellanger
- Jacques Castelot as Duc de Vandeuvres
- Noël Roquevert as Steiner
