= Luccioni =

Luccioni is a surname. Notable people with the surname include:

- José Luccioni (actor) (1949–2022), French actor and artistic director
- José Luccioni (tenor) (1903–1978), French operatic tenor of Corsican origin
- Micheline Luccioni (1930–1992), French actress
- Sasha Luccioni (born 1990), Ukrainian computer scientist
