= Maxime (film) =

1958 film by Henri Verneuil

- Film poster
- Directed by: Henri Verneuil
- Written by: Henri Verneuil; Henri Jeanson; Albert Valentin
- Produced by: Raoul Ploquin; Ignace Morgenstern
- Starring: Michèle Morgan; Charles Boyer; Arletty
- Cinematography: Christian Matras
- Edited by: Gabriel Rongier
- Music by: Georges Van Parys
- Distributed by: Cocinor
- Release date: 26 November 1958
- Running time: 124 minutes
- Country: France
- Language: French

Maxime is a 1958 French comedy-drama film directed by Henri Verneuil who co-wrote screenplay with Henri Jeanson and Albert Valentin. It based on novel by Henri Duvernois. The film stars Michèle Morgan, Charles Boyer, Arletty and Jane Marken.

It tells the story of an ageing roue, a rich man and a lovely woman.

== Cast ==
- Charles Boyer as Maxime Cherpray
- Michèle Morgan as Jacqueline Monneron
- Arletty as Gazelle
- Jane Marken as Coco Naval
- Félix Marten as Hubert Treffujean
- Jacques Dufilho as Flick
- Micheline Luccioni as Liliane
