= Adorable Creatures =

1952 film directed by Christian-Jaque

- Poster
- Directed by: Christian-Jaque
- Written by: Charles Spaak; Jacques Companéez; Christian-Jaque
- Produced by: Lucien Masson; Jacques Roitfeld
- Starring: Daniel Gélin; Antonella Lualdi; Danielle Darrieux; Martine Carol
- Cinematography: Christian Matras
- Edited by: Jacques Desagneaux
- Music by: Georges Van Parys
- Production companies: Les Productions Jacques Roitfeld; La Société des Films Sirius; Caretta Film
- Distributed by: La Société des Films Sirius
- Release date: 5 September 1952
- Running time: 110 minutes
- Countries: France; Italy
- Language: French

Adorable Creatures (French: Adorables créatures, Italian: Quando le donne amano) is a 1952 romantic comedy film directed by Christian-Jaque. A French-Italian co-production, it stars Daniel Gélin, Antonella Lualdi, Danielle Darrieux and Martine Carol. It was shot at the Billancourt Studios in Paris. The film's sets were designed by the art director Robert Gys; costumes were designed by Jacques Heim and Pierre Balmain.

== Synopsis ==
André, an unmarried commercial artist in Paris, has a lot of free time which he devotes to pursuing older women, not being interested in the lively Catherine, a schoolgirl in the next apartment. His lover Christiane wants to be free of her dull husband Jacques, but when she does leave him does not then want to be encumbered by André. He meets the glamorous Minouche, who wants to leave her boring lover Georges and go on a skiing holiday. There she meets the rich Gaston and drops André, who is briefly consoled by Évelyne, Gaston's discarded mistress. Returning to Paris he is scooped up by the even older Denise, a rich and beautiful widow, but excites her jealousy by befriending her young secretary Alice.

Back in his apartment on his own, one night his neighbours beg him to retrieve Catherine, who has run off to a country hotel with a boy named Bob. Driving there, he sends Bob packing and goes up to Catherine's bedroom. After wrecking the room in a fight, they end up on the bed together. She says she has always loved him and they agree to get married immediately. A voice-over says this is not the end of André's troubles, as he might think, but the beginning.

== Cast ==
- Daniel Gélin as André Noblet
- Antonella Lualdi as Catherine Michaud
- Danielle Darrieux as Christine
- Martine Carol as Minouche
- Edwige Feuillère as Denise Aubusson
- Renée Faure as Alice
- Georges Chamarat as Edmond, Catherine's Father
- Daniel Lecourtois as Jacques
- Marilyn Buferd as Evelyne
- Jean-Marc Tennberg as Pianist
- France Roche as Françoise
- Giovanna Galletti as Director
- Georges Tourreil as Étienne
- Raphaël Patorni as Man
- Robert Rollis as Bob
- Judith Magre as Jenny

== Bibliography ==
- Bandy, Mary Lea (1983). Rediscovering French Film. New York: Museum of Modern Art. ISBN 978-0-87070-335-5.
