= Bolero (1942 film) =

1942 film

- Directed by: Jean Boyer
- Written by: Michel Duran (play and screenplay)
- Produced by: Ferdinand Liffran; Adrien Remaugé
- Starring: Arletty; André Luguet; Jacques Dumesnil
- Cinematography: Victor Arménise
- Edited by: Louisette Hautecoeur
- Music by: Georges Van Parys
- Production company: Pathé Consortium Cinéma
- Distributed by: Pathé Consortium Cinéma
- Release date: 25 March 1942
- Running time: 96 minutes
- Country: France
- Language: French

Bolero (French: Boléro) is a 1942 French comedy film directed by Jean Boyer and starring Arletty, André Luguet and Jacques Dumesnil. It takes its name from the Bolero, a Latin American dance and the composer Maurice Ravel's piece of music inspired by the style of it.

The film's sets were designed by the art director Lucien Aguettand. It was made by Pathé at the company's Francoeur Studios. Future star Simone Signoret had a small, uncredited role in the film.

== Cast ==
- Arletty as Catherine
- André Luguet as Rémi
- Jacques Dumesnil as Georges
- Meg Lemonnier as Miquette
- Christian Gérard as Paul Bardot
- André Bervil as Laurent
- Louis Salou as Professeur Archaimbaud
- Paul Ollivier as Le deuxième témoin
- Jacques Roussel as Horace
- Guita Karen as La bonne
- Denise Grey as Anne-Marie
- Lucienne Legrand
- Nathalie Alexeeff
- Janine Berry
- Marguerite de Morlaye as Dame à la présentation de la collection
- Robert Le Fort as Un comédien de théâtre
- Frédéric Mariotti as Le comédien
- Simone Signoret as Une employée de la maison de couture (uncredited)

== Bibliography ==
- Hayward, Susan. Simone Signoret: The Star as Cultural Sign. A&C Black, 2004.
