= The Bed (film) =

1954 anthology film

- French: Secrets d’alcôve
- Directed by: Jean Delannoy; Henri Decoin; Gianni Franciolini; Ralph Habib
- Written by: Sergio Amidei; Paul Andréota; Maurice Aubergé; Antoine Blondin; Henri Decoin; Jean Delannoy; Jacques Fano; Michel Kelber; Roland Laudenbach; Carlo Rim; Niccolò Theodoli
- Produced by: Jacques Bar; Raymond Froment; Lorens Marmstedt; Julien Rivière
- Starring: Jeanne Moreau; Vittorio De Sica
- Cinematography: Christian Matras; Enzo Serafin; Léonce-Henri Burel; Michel Kelber
- Edited by: James Cuenet; Denise Reiss
- Music by: Mario Nascimbene; Georges Van Parys
- Production companies: Cormoran Films; Industrie Cinematografiche Sociali; Terra Film Produktion
- Distributed by: Pathé Consortium Cinéma
- Release date: 21 May 1954
- Running time: 86 minutes
- Countries: France; Italy
- Language: French

Secrets d’alcôve is a 1954 French comedy film made up of four sketches by Henri Decoin (segment "Le billet de logement"), Jean Delannoy ("Le lit de la Pompadour"), Gianni Franciolini ("Le divorce") and Ralph Habib ("Riviera-Express"). Kingsley International released the film in the UK.

== Cast by segment ==
- "Le Billet de logement" features Jeanne Moreau and Richard Todd.
- "Le Lit de la Pompadour" with Martine Carol, François Périer and Bernard Blier
- "Le Divorce" with Dawn Addams and Vittorio De Sica
- "Riviera-Express" with Françoise Arnoul and Marcel Mouloudji

== Plot ==
The story brings with four travellers forced by weather to find temporary shelter who tell four stories, whose common point is a bed.

- "The lodging slip" - During the war, an English officer captain Davidson comes to the house of Jeanne Plisson with a requisition slip for accommodation. Her husband is absent at the front while she is pregnant. During the night, she gives birth and Davidson must act as midwife.
- "The Divorce" - Roberto, an American living in New York wants to divorce. He shares the night at a hotel with Janet.
- "Riviera Express" - truck driver Riquet meets Martine whose car has broken down.
- "The bed of Pompadour" - a bed is mis-delivered to Agnes

== Production ==
Richard Todd said his scene was shot over ten days in English and French versions. He wrote in his memoirs that the story "may not sound very amusing in the telling, but with a neat script and Decoin’s adroit direction it promised to be a really funny and slightly dotty little cameo."
