= Lucrèce Borgia =

1953 film by Christian-Jaque

- Directed by: Christian-Jaque
- Written by: Christian-Jaque; Cécil Saint-Laurent; Jacques Sigurd (dialogue & screenplay)
- Produced by: Alexandre Mnouchkine; Angelo Rizzoli; Francis Cosne; Georges Dancigers; Georges Lourau
- Starring: Martine Carol; Pedro Armendáriz
- Cinematography: Christian Matras
- Edited by: Jacques Desagneaux
- Music by: Maurice Thiriet
- Release dates: 23 October 1953 (France); 1 December 1953 (Italy)
- Running time: 120 minutes
- Countries: Italy; France
- Language: French
- Box office: $366,000

Lucrèce Borgia (also known as Lucretia Borgia or Sins of the Borgias) is a 1953 French drama film starring Martine Carol and Pedro Armendáriz. The film was directed by Christian-Jaque, who co-wrote screenplay with Cécil Saint-Laurent and Jacques Sigurd, based on a novel by Alfred Schirokauer. The film tells the story of the Borgia family of Italy during the Renaissance.

It was released on DVD in the US on 26 May 2009.

== Cast ==
- Martine Carol – Lucrece Borgia
- Pedro Armendáriz – Cesar Borgia
- Massimo Serato – Duke of Aragon
- Valentine Tessier – Julie Farmesa
- Louis Seigner – Mage, Soothsayer
- Arnoldo Foà – Micheletto
- Christian Marquand – Paolo
- Tania Fédor – Vanna
- Georges Lannes – Ambassador
- Maurice Ronet – Perott
