= José Luccioni =

José Luccioni may refer to:

- José Luccioni (tenor)
- José Luccioni (actor)
