= Jacques Desagneaux =

French film director and film editor

- Born: 18 February 1905; Vincennes, France
- Occupations: Editor, Actor
- Years active: 1930-1967 (film)

Jacques Desagneaux (born 18 February 1905) was a French film editor, active between 1930 and 1967. He was also an occasional actor, appearing in a handful of films.

== Biography ==
Aside from directing a single film in 1932 (Mise en plis, starring Philippe Richard and Raymond Dandy), Jacques Desagneaux worked primarily as a film editor. His career spanned over seventy films—mostly French, alongside several co-productions and one Italian film—with his first two credits released in 1930.

Notably, he was a frequent collaborator of director Christian-Jaque, beginning with La Symphonie fantastique (1942, starring Jean-Louis Barrault as Hector Berlioz and Renée Saint-Cyr) through to his final film released in 1967, Two Tickets to Mexico (a co-production starring Peter Lawford and Ira von Fürstenberg). Among the twenty-eight other films created by this duo are Boule de Suif (1945, starring Micheline Presle and Louis Salou), Fanfan la Tulipe (1952, starring Gérard Philipe and Gina Lollobrigida), and Les Bonnes Causes (1963, starring Pierre Brasseur, Marina Vlady, and Bourvil).

Other directors Jacques Desagneaux worked with include Jean Boyer (four films, including Sénéchal the Magnificent in 1957, starring Fernandel and Nadia Gray), Léon Mathot (five films, including Aloha, le chant des îles in 1937, starring Jean Murat and Danièle Parola), Fernand Rivers (eight films, including Berlingot et compagnie in 1939, starring Fernandel, Fernand Charpin, and Suzy Prim), and René Sti (three films, including The Bread Peddler in 1934, starring Germaine Dermoz and Fernandel).

He is sometimes confused with his brother, the actor Lucien Desagneaux.

== Selected filmography ==
- My Friend Victor (1931)
- Coquecigrole (1931)
- Panurge (1932)
- To the Polls, Citizens (1932)
- A Telephone Call (1932)
- The Invisible Woman (1933)
- The Bread Peddler (1934)
- The Mascot (1935)
- Ferdinand the Roisterer (1935)
- The Two Boys (1936)
- Wolves Between Them (1936)
- A Man to Kill (1937)
- Four in the Morning (1938)
- The President (1938)
- Fire in the Straw (1939)
- Berlingot and Company (1939)
- Notre-Dame de la Mouise (1941)
- Carmen (1942)
- La Symphonie fantastique (1942)
- Voyage Without Hope (1943)
- The Devil Goes to Boarding School (1944)
- The Battle of the Rails (1946)
- A Lover's Return (1946)
- Mystery Trip (1947)
- Man to Men (1948)
- All Roads Lead to Rome (1949)
- Lost Souvenirs (1950)
- Adorable Creatures (1952)
- Fanfan la Tulipe (1952)
- Lucrèce Borgia (1953)
- Daughters of Destiny (1954)
- Madame du Barry (1954)
- Nana (1955)
- Nathalie (1957)
- Sénéchal the Magnificent (1957)
- The Law Is the Law (1958)
- The Gendarme of Champignol (1959)
- Dynamite Jack (1961)
- The Gentleman from Epsom (1962)
- The Black Tulip (1964)
- Champagne for Savages (1964)
- The Man from Cocody (1965)
- The Second Twin (1966)
- The Saint Lies in Wait (1966)

== Bibliography ==
- Mitchell, Charles P. The Great Composers Portrayed on Film, 1913 through 2002. McFarland, 2004.
