= Venetian Honeymoon =

- Directed by: Alberto Cavalcanti
- Written by: Jean Ferry; Claude-André Puget; Luciano Vincenzoni
- Story by: Abel Hermant
- Starring: Martine Carol; Vittorio De Sica
- Cinematography: Gianni Di Venanzo
- Edited by: Elsa Arata; Maurizio Lucidi; Yvonne Martin
- Music by: Jean Françaix; Carlo Rustichelli
- Release date: 1959
- Language: Italian

Venetian Honeymoon (Italian: La prima notte, French: Les noces vénitiennes) is a 1959 Italian-French romantic comedy film directed by Alberto Cavalcanti. It is loosely based on the Abel Hermant novel Les noces vénitiennes.

== Cast ==
- Martine Carol as Isabelle
- Vittorio De Sica as Alfredo
- Philippe Nicaud as Gérard Chevalier
- Marthe Mercadier as Antoinette Sophronides
- Jacques Sernas as Roberto Lo Bello, aka "Bob Lebel"
- Claudia Cardinale as Angelica
- Giacomo Furia as Stanislao
- Don Ziegler as Aristide Sophronides, aka "Soso"
- Martita Hunt as Lisa Bradwell
- André Versini as Marquis Rodrigo Gutierrez
- Ave Ninchi as Jolanda
- Brigitte Juslin as Franca
- Ivan Dominique as John
