= Gérard Buhr =

French actor (1928–1988)

- Born: 8 May 1928; Strasbourg, France
- Died: 8 January 1988 (aged 59); Paris, France
- Occupation: Actor
- Years active: 1950–1988 (film & TV)

Gérard Buhr (8 May 1928 – 8 January 1988) was a French film and television actor.

== Selected filmography ==
- Fusillé à l'aube (1950)
- Quai de Grenelle (1950) - Petit rôle (uncredited)
- Beware of Blondes (1950) - Un journaliste (uncredited)
- Monte Carlo Baby (1951)
- The Straw Lover (1951) - Gaston's employées
- Skipper Next to God (1951) - L'officier allemand
- The passer-through-walls (1951) - (uncredited)
- Paris Vice Squad (1951) - (uncredited)
- Les Mémoires de la vache Yolande (1951)
- Les Miracles n'ont lieu qu'une fois (1951) - (uncredited)
- Les Petites Cardinal (1951)
- Shadow and Light (1951) - Le garçon de café (uncredited)
- Dirty Hands (1951) - Presder
- Atoll K (1951) - Une sentinelle (uncredited)
- The Cape of Hope (1951)
- Nous irons à Monte Carlo (1951)
- Jocelyn (1952)
- Fanfan la Tulipe (1952) - Un soldat
- Le Chemin de Damas (1952)
- My Husband Is Marvelous (1952)
- Follow That Man (1953) - Le jeune au flipper (uncredited)
- Les amants de minuit (1953)
- The Earrings of Madame de... (1953) - Le douanier (uncredited)
- La dame aux camélias (1953) - (uncredited)
- Alarm in Morocco (1953) - Bernis
- Le Chevalier de la nuit (1953) - Un policier
- Act of Love (1953) - (uncredited)
- Daughters of Destiny (1954) - Kennedy (segment "Jeanne")
- Tempest in the Flesh (1954) - Paul, l'ouvrier polonais
- Flesh and the Woman (1954) - legionnaire
- The Cheerful Squadron (1954) - Defaulter
- Yours Truly, Blake (1954)
- La rafle est pour ce soir (1954)
- One Step to Eternity (1954) - William Jordan
- To Catch a Thief (1955) - Inspecteur (uncredited)
- Les Mémoires d'un flic (1956) - Gérard Dominique
- Bob le Flambeur (1956) - Marc
- Elena and Her Men (1956) - Un soldat
- Alerte au Deuxième Bureau (1956) - Battini
- Michel Strogoff (1956) - Henry Blount
- Deuxième Bureau contre inconnu (1957) - Yerco
- Gates of Paris (1957) - Un inspecteur (uncredited)
- Back to the Wall (1958) - Mario
- Me and the Colonel (1958) - German Captain
- A Bullet in the Gun Barrel (1958) - Alberto
- Normandie-Niémen (1960) - Le capitaine de Liron
- Lovers on a Tightrope (1960) - Henri
- Spotlight on a Murderer (1961) - Henri
- Le cave se rebiffe (1961) - Detective Martin
- The Black Monocle (1961) - Heinrich
- Léon Morin, Priest (1961) - Gunther
- Le Monte-charge (1962) - Le policier chez la vendeuse #1 (uncredited)
- The Law of Men (1962) - Le Patron
- À couteaux tirés (1963) - Ludwig Hermann
- The Train (1964) - Corporal
- The Counterfeit Constable (1964) - L'ami de Patricia
- Pleins feux sur Stanislas (1965) - (uncredited)
- The Night of the Generals (1967) - Colonel Claus von Stauffenberg
- Pasha (1968) - Arsène
- The Night of the Following Day (1968) - Fisherman-Cop
- Les Patates (1969) - Serge
- Le clan des siciliens (1969) - Un inspecteur
- The Deadly Trap (1971) - Le psychiatre
- The Day of the Jackal (1973) - Gendarme talking on the phone
- Love and Death (1975) - Servant
- Les Loulous (1977) - Le père de Ben (uncredited)
- The French Woman (1977) - Firmin
- Julia (1977) - Passport Officer
- An Almost Perfect Affair (1979)
- Condorman (1980) - (uncredited)
- Your Ticket Is No Longer Valid (1981) - Hotel Clerk
- Enigma (1982)
- Five Days One Summer (1982) - Brendel
- S.A.S. à San Salvador (1983)
- Les Morfalous (1984) - L'officier du camp de ravitaillement
- The Blood of Others (1984) - Major Allemand restaurant Meurice
- A View to a Kill (1985) - Auctioneer

== Bibliography ==
- Capua, Michelangelo. Anatole Litvak: The Life and Films. McFarland, 2015.
