= Romance of Paris =

1941 film

- Directed by: Jean Boyer
- Written by: Jean Boyer
- Produced by: Adrien Remaugé
- Starring: Charles Trenet; Jean Tissier; Yvette Lebon
- Cinematography: Christian Matras
- Edited by: Louisette Hautecoeur
- Music by: Georges Van Parys
- Production company: Pathé Consortium Cinéma
- Distributed by: Pathé Consortium Cinéma
- Release date: 3 October 1941
- Running time: 110 minutes
- Country: France
- Language: French

Romance of Paris (French: Romance de Paris) is a 1941 French musical film directed by Jean Boyer and starring Charles Trenet, Jean Tissier and Yvette Lebon. The film was shot at the Francoeur Studios in Paris. It was produced and distributed by Pathé.

== Synopsis ==
Georges Gauthier is the son of a singer who made his mother unhappy and then abandoned them. Because of this she raises him away from the world of entertainment, but it is his blood and her performs in the cafes of Paris in the evenings under an assumed name. He keeps this a secret from both his mother and his fiancée.

== Cast ==
- Charles Trenet as Georges Gauthier
- Jean Tissier as Jules
- Yvette Lebon as Jeannette
- Sylvie as Madame Gauthier
- Jacqueline Porel as Madeleine
- Germaine Lix as Madame Lourmel
- Robert Le Vigan as Monsieur Lormel
- Fred Pasquali as Nicolas, the impresario
- Maurice Teynac as Maurice
- Albert Broquin as the theatre technical manager
- André Alerme as Cartier, the director
- Georges Bever as an accordion player
- Raymond Bussières as a player
- Léonce Corne as a waiter
- Lucienne Vigier

== Bibliography ==
- Bertin-Maghit, Jean Pierre. Le cinéma français sous Vichy: les films français de 1940 à 1944. Revue du Cinéma Albatros, 1980.
- Burch, Noël & Sellier, Geneviève. The Battle of the Sexes in French Cinema, 1930–1956. Duke University Press, 2013.
- Ratković, Milan. Bouquinistes of Paris. L'AGE D'HOMME, 2000.
