= Daughters of Destiny (film) =

- Theatrical release poster
- Directed by: Marcello Pagliero (segment "Elisabeth"); Jean Delannoy (segment "Jeanne"); Christian-Jaque (segment "Lysistrata")
- Written by: Sergio Amidei; André-Paul Antoine; Jean Aurenche; Pierre Bost; Jean Ferry; Ennio Flaiano; Carlo Rim; Henri Jeanson; Vladimir Pozner; André Tabet
- Story by: Sergio Amidei (segment "Elisabeth"); Aristophanes (segment "Lysistrata")
- Produced by: Henry Deutschmeister
- Starring: Claudette Colbert; Michèle Morgan; Martine Carol
- Cinematography: Mario Craveri (segment "Elisabeth"); Robert Lefebvre (segment "Jeanne"); Raffaele Masciocchi; Christian Matras (segment "Lysistrata")
- Edited by: Laure Casseau (segment "Elisabeth"); James Cuenet (segment "Jeanne"); Jacques Desagneaux (segment "Lysistrata")
- Music by: Roman Vlad
- Production companies: Franco London Films; Continental Produzione
- Distributed by: Continental Produzione
- Release dates: 21 January 1954 (Italy); 27 January 1954 (France)
- Running time: 94 minutes (U.S.); 96 minutes (UK)
- Countries: France; Italy
- Languages: French; English

Daughters of Destiny (UK title: Love, Soldiers and Women, French title: Destinées and Italian title: Destini di donne) is a 1954 Franco-Italian co-production motion picture comedy drama directed by Marcello Pagliero, Jean Delannoy and Christian-Jaque. The film stars Claudette Colbert (segment "Elisabeth"), Michèle Morgan (segment "Jeanne") and Martine Carol (segment "Lysistrata"). It tells three stories, which are unrelated, but each deal with a woman and war.

== Plot ==
In this trilogy of stories, the episode "Elizabeth" is about an American war-widow who goes to Italy where her husband was in World War II. The episode "Jeanne" tells the life of Jeanne d'Arc. The episode "Lysistrata" is about Athenian wives, an adaptation of the Greek play.

== Principal cast ==
segment "Elisabeth"

- Claudette Colbert as Elizabeth Whitefield
- Eleonora Rossi Drago as Angela Ascari/Farmgirl
- Mirko Ellis as Anthony

segment "Jeanne"

- Michèle Morgan as Jeanne d'Arc/Joan of Arc
- Michel Piccoli as Pasquerel
- Dora Doll as Une fille
- Katherine Kath as La ribaude

segment "Lysistrata"

- Martine Carol as Lysistrata
- Raf Vallone as Callias
- Paolo Stoppa as Nicephore
