= The Cape of Hope =

1951 film directed by Raymond Bernard

- Directed by: Raymond Bernard
- Written by: Raymond Bernard; Pierre Laroche
- Based on: Notre Peau by José-André Lacour
- Produced by: Francis Cosne; Georges Dancigers; Alexandre Mnouchkine
- Starring: Edwige Feuillère; Frank Villard; Jean Debucourt
- Cinematography: Robert Lefebvre
- Edited by: Jacqueline Sadoul
- Music by: Joseph Kosma
- Production companies: Francinex; Italia Produzione; La Société des Films Sirius; Les Films Ariane
- Distributed by: La Société des Films Sirius
- Release date: 14 November 1951
- Running time: 90 minutes
- Countries: France; Italy
- Language: French

The Cape of Hope (French: Le Cap de l'espérance) is a 1951 French-Italian crime film directed by Raymond Bernard and starring Edwige Feuillère, Frank Villard and Jean Debucourt. It was shot at the Billancourt Studios and on location at various places in the Department of Var. The film's sets were designed by the art director Robert Gys.

== Cast ==
Actor	Character
Edwige Feuillère	Lyria
Frank Villard	Robert 'Bob' Legeay
Cosetta Greco	Minnie Liakim
Jean Debucourt	Commissaire André Troyon
Paolo Stoppa	Simon Liakim
Jean-Marc Tennberg	Georges Monval
Jean Témerson	Docteur Pagolos
William Tubbs	Commodore Rinaldi
Philippe Olive	Le notaire
Maurice Schutz	Marquis du Taillis
Jean Hébey	M. Flavey
Albert Michel	Un joueur de cartes
Jean Thielment	Hugo, le barman
Gérard Buhr	Un habitué du bar
Claude Lehmann	Le commodore
André Valmy	Sem
Bernard Lajarrige	Raymond
Gil Delamare	Le pilote du bateau
Robert Berri	Un inspecteur de police

== Bibliography ==
- Parish, James Robert. Film Actors Guide: Western Europe. Scarecrow Press, 1977.
