= Trente et Quarante (film) =

1946 film

- Directed by: Gilles Grangier
- Screenplay by: André-Paul Antoine
- Based on: Trente et Quarante by Edmond About
- Produced by: Paul-Edmond Decharme
- Starring: Georges Guétary; André Alerme; Martine Carol
- Cinematography: Fred Langenfeld
- Edited by: Germaine Artus
- Music by: Francis Lopez; Jacques Larue
- Distributed by: Gaumont Distribution
- Release date: 1946
- Running time: 75 minutes
- Country: France
- Language: French
- Box office: 2,172,386 admissions (France)

Trente et Quarante (English: Thirty or Forty is a 1946 French comedy film directed by Gilles Grangier and starring Martine Carol.

It takes its title from the card game Trente et Quarante.

The film was successful at the box office with 2,172,386 admissions.
