= The Big Chief =

1959 film

- Directed by: Henri Verneuil
- Written by: Jean Manse; Henri Troyat; Henri Verneuil
- Based on: The Ransom of Red Chief by O. Henry
- Produced by: Joseph Bercholz; Henry Deutschmeister
- Starring: Fernandel; Gino Cervi; Florence Blot
- Cinematography: Roger Hubert
- Edited by: Borys Lewin
- Music by: Gérard Calvi
- Production companies: Franco London Films; Les Films Gibé; Zebra Films
- Distributed by: Gaumont Distribution
- Release date: 20 March 1959
- Running time: 92 minutes
- Countries: France; Italy
- Language: French

The Big Chief (French: Le grand chef, Italian: Noi gangsters) is a 1959 French-Italian comedy film directed by Henri Verneuil and starring Fernandel, Gino Cervi and Florence Blot. It is based on the short story The Ransom of Red Chief by O. Henry. It was shot at the Boulogne Studios in Parisl The film's sets were designed by the art director Robert Clavel. It is also known by the alternative title Gangster Boss. The two stars were known for their appearances together in the Don Camillo series of films. The story had previously been adapted for the 1952 American film O. Henry's Full House.

== Synopsis ==
Two garage attendants kidnap the son of a millionaire, decoying him by dressing up as Native Americans. However he soon proves to be such a handful that they can't wait for his father to take him off their hands.

== Cast ==
- Fernandel as Antoine Venturen
- Gino Cervi as Paulo
- Papouf as Eric Jumelin
- Florence Blot as Mme Florentin, la nurse
- Georges Chamarat as Jules, le majordome
- Dominique Davray as La voisine d'en face
- Jean-Jacques Delbo as M. Jumelin
- Héléna Manson as La guide polyglotte au Louvre
- Albert Michel as Le voisin d'en face
- Noëlle Norman as Mme Jumelin
- Gabriel Gobin as Le chauffeur de taxi

== Bibliography ==
- Bessy, Maurice & Chirat, Raymond. Histoire du cinéma français: 1956-1960. Pygmalion, 1986.
- Parish, James Robert. Film Actors Guide: Western Europe. Scarecrow Press, 1977.
- Rège, Philippe. Encyclopedia of French Film Directors, Volume 1. Scarecrow Press, 2009.
