= Champagne for Savages =

1964 film

- Directed by: Christian-Jaque
- Written by: Claude Marcy; Henri Jeanson; Christian-Jaque
- Based on: Le repas des fauves by Vahé Katcha
- Produced by: Raymond Froment; Jacques Bar
- Starring: Claude Nicot; France Anglade; Antonella Lualdi
- Cinematography: Pierre Petit
- Edited by: Jacques Desagneaux
- Music by: Gérard Calvi
- Production companies: France International Films; London Films; Terra Film; Vertice Producciones Cinematograficas; Flora Film; Films Borderie
- Distributed by: S.N. Prodis
- Release date: 26 August 1964
- Running time: 99 minutes
- Countries: France; Italy; Spain
- Language: French

Champagne for Savages (French: Le repas des fauves) is a 1964 war comedy drama film directed by Christian-Jaque and starring Claude Nicot, France Anglade and Antonella Lualdi. It was made as a co-production between France, Italy and Spain and was based on a play by Vahé Katcha. It was shot at the Saint-Maurice Studios in Paris. The film's sets were designed by the art director Jean d'Eaubonne.

== Synopsis ==
In 1942 in a provincial town in Occupied France, a group gather to celebrate a woman's birthday. When some German troops are killed outside the house, a Gestapo official informs them that two of their number will be shot in retaliation. This unlocks their dark secrets as they compete not to be the ones executed.

== Cast ==
- Claude Nicot as Victor
- France Anglade as Sophie
- Antonella Lualdi as Françoise
- Francis Blanche as Francis
- Boy Gobert as Kaubach
- Adolfo Marsillach as Le docteur
- Dominique Paturel as Jean-Louis
- Claude Rich as Claude

== Bibliography ==
- Goble, Alan. The Complete Index to Literary Sources in Film. Walter de Gruyter, 1999.
- Oscherwitz, Dayna & Higgins, Maryellen. The A to Z of French Cinema. Scarecrow Press, 2009.
- Rège, Philippe. Encyclopedia of French Film Directors, Volume 1. Scarecrow Press, 2009.
