= Action of the Tiger =

1957 film by Terence Young

- Original film poster
- Directed by: Terence Young
- Screenplay by: Robert Carson; Peter Myers
- Based on: Action of the Tiger by James Wellard
- Produced by: Kenneth Harper
- Starring: Van Johnson; Martine Carol; Herbert Lom; Gustavo Rojo
- Cinematography: Desmond Dickinson
- Edited by: Frank Clarke
- Music by: Humphrey Searle
- Production companies: Claridge Productions; Van Johnson Enterprises
- Distributed by: Metro-Goldwyn-Mayer
- Release dates: 22 August 1957 (London); 30 August 1957 (USA)
- Running time: 93 minutes
- Country: United Kingdom
- Language: English
- Budget: $863,000
- Box office: $1,640,000

Action of the Tiger is a 1957 British CinemaScope action film directed by Terence Young and starring Van Johnson and Martine Carol. It was distributed by MGM.

The plot is about the rescue of a political prisoner held in Albania. Carson, played by Van Johnson, is an American contraband runner approached by Tracy Mallambert, a French woman who wants him to help rescue her brother Henri. The supporting actor Sean Connery would reunite with director Terence Young for the first film in the James Bond series, Dr. No (1962). The title comes from William Shakespeare's play Henry V.

== Plot ==
French heiress Tracy Mallambert, in search for her brother Henri after rumors that he defected during a diplomatic post, tries to bribe ship captain Carson in Athens, Greece, to smuggle her into the People's Socialist Republic of Albania. Although he refuses, she sneaks onto his ship anyways and he reluctantly agrees to transport her. She learns that he is smuggling out Greek refugee children from Northern Epirus. Carson's contact Kol Stendho abandons them in the village of Vojsev after shooting an Albanian People's Army sentry, where they find Henri in a cathedral. Carson agrees to break Henri, who was arrested and blinded by Communist authorities, and his lover Mara out of the country. Tracy and Carson take Henri, Mara, and a group of children out of the country as they begin to fall in love. The group is ambushed by bandits led by Trifon who agree to escort the rest of the group into Greece in exchange for allowing Tracy to remain with them. However, the bandits are killed attacking a fake border checkpoint and the rest are captured. Kol returns in disguise as an Albanian officer and rescues them. They finally escape a battalion of Albanian soldiers aboard Carson's yacht.

== Cast ==
- Van Johnson as Carson
- Martine Carol as Tracy Mallambert
- Herbert Lom as Trifon
- Gustavo Rojo as Henri Mallambert
- José Nieto as Kol Stenho
- Helen Haye as The Countess
- Anna Gerber as Mara
- Anthony Dawson as Security Officer
- Sean Connery as Mike
- Yvonne Romain as Katina
- Norman MacOwan as Trifon's father
- Helen Goss as Farmer's Wife
- Richard Williams as Abdyll

== Production ==
The film was shot primarily in Spain, with Almuñécar serving as headquarters. Other scenes were shot in Athens and MGM-British Studios, Elstree.

The British partners provided £248,383 plus the US budget of $750,000.

== Reception ==
According to MGM records, the film earned $465,000 in the United States and Canada and $1,175,000 elsewhere, resulting in a net profit of $25,000.

== See also ==
- List of American films of 1957
