= Nathalie (1957 film) =

1957 film

- Directed by: Christian-Jaque
- Written by: Jean Ferry; Christian-Jaque; Jacques Emmanuel; Henri Jeanson; Pierre Apestéguy
- Based on: Natalie Princess by Franck Marchal
- Produced by: Roger de Broin; Alain Poiré; Roger Ribadeau-Dumas
- Starring: Martine Carol; Mischa Auer; Michel Piccoli
- Cinematography: Robert Lefebvre
- Edited by: Jacques Desagneaux
- Music by: Gaston Muller; Georges Van Parys
- Production companies: Electra Compagnia Cinematografica; France International Films; Gaumont
- Distributed by: Gaumont Distribution
- Release date: 4 December 1957
- Running time: 95 minutes
- Countries: France; Italy
- Language: French

Nathalie is a 1957 French-Italian comedy crime film directed by Christian-Jaque and starring Martine Carol, Mischa Auer and Michel Piccoli. It was shot at the Joinville Studios of Franstudio and the Photosonor Studios, both in Paris. Location shooting also took place around the city including the Printemps department store and Paris Airport. The film's sets were designed by the art director Robert Gys. It was followed by a sequel Nathalie, Secret Agent in 1959, also starring Carol.

== Synopsis ==
Nathalie, a model at a Parisian fashion house is wrongly accused of a stealing a valuable clip from a customer, the countess de Lancy. When it is discovered soon afterwards she takes it to the Neuilly residence of the countess, but finds her dead. She is then kidnapped by some gangsters but manages to escape, and makes contact with a police officer she is friendly with. Together they embark on an investigation. She discovers that the countess was the leader of a gang of thieves, who has been murdered by an underworld rival.

== Cast ==
- Martine Carol as Nathalie Princesse
- Mischa Auer as Cyril Boran
- Michel Piccoli as L'inspecteur Franck Marchal
- Louis Seigner a s Le commissaire Pipart
- Lise Delamare as La comtesse de Lancy
- Jacques Dufilho as Simon, le domestique de comtesse / Simon the Valet
- Pierre Goutas as Un ami de Coco
- Grégoire Gromoff as Le chauffeur de taxi
- Jacques Mancier as Un inspecteur
- Jacques Mauclair as Émile Truffaut
- Armande Navarre as Pivoine
- Hubert Noël as Serge Lambert
- Frédéric O'Brady as Patins à ressort', lhomme au pied-bot / The Traveler
- Fernand Rauzéna as Géo, un ami de Coco
- Jess Hahn as Sam
- Aimé Clariond as Le comte Auguste Claude Superbe de Lancy
- Philippe Clay as Adolphe Faisant, dit "Coco la Girafe"

== Bibliography ==
- Chiti, Roberto & Poppi, Roberto. Dizionario del cinema italiano: Dal 1945 al 1959. Gremese Editore, 1991.
- Goble, Alan. The Complete Index to Literary Sources in Film. Walter de Gruyter, 1999.
- Nowell-Smith, Geoffrey. The Oxford History of World Cinema. Oxford University Press, 1996.
