= Robert Clavel (art director) =

French art director (1912–1991)

- Born: 15 October 1912; Paris, France
- Died: 14 July 1991 (aged 78)
- Occupation: Art director
- Years active: 1945-1978 (film)

Robert Clavel (1912–1991) was a French art director.

== Selected filmography ==
- All Roads Lead to Rome (1949)
- Tuesday's Guest (1950)
- Old Boys of Saint-Loup (1950)
- The Paris Waltz (1950)
- Skipper Next to God (1951)
- Young Love (1951)
- Passion (1951)
- Love, Madame (1952)
- Twelve Hours of Happiness (1952)
- She and Me (1952)
- Virgile (1953)
- The Count of Monte Cristo (1954)
- Yours Truly, Blake (1954)
- Tides of Passion (1956)
- Charming Boys (1957)
- The Big Chief (1959)
- Nathalie, Secret Agent (1959)
- Arsène Lupin Versus Arsène Lupin (1962)
- Belle de Jour (1967)
- Under the Sign of the Bull (1969)

== Bibliography ==
- Hayward, Susan. French Costume Drama of the 1950s: Fashioning Politics in Film. Intellect Books, 2010.
