= Comme un cheveu sur la soupe =

- Directed by: Maurice Regamey
- Written by: Yvan Audouard; Jean Redon
- Produced by: Jules Borkon
- Starring: Louis de Funès
- Music by: Georges Van Parys
- Production company: Champs-Élysées Production
- Distributed by: Pathé Consortium
- Release date: 23 August 1957 (France)
- Running time: 81 minutes
- Country: France
- Language: French

Comme un cheveu sur la soupe (lit. 'Like a hair in the soup', translating as "out of left field" or "out of the blue"), is a French 1957 comedy film, directed by Maurice Regamey, written by Yvan Audouard, starring Louis de Funès.

The film is also known under the English-language titles Crazy in the Noodle or Kindly Kill Me (United States). It is best known as de Funès's first lead role, before he went on to become France's biggest comedy star.

== Plot ==
Pianist and composer Pierre Cousin is depressed by his lack of success and by the breakup with his girlfriend. He tries to kill himself several times, but always fails. He then decides to hire a hit man to end his life. Soon after, he saves a young singer named Caroline from drowning after she tries to jump into the river.

Pierre's gallant act is noticed by the media: he unexpectedly becomes a celebrity, his music becomes popular, and he and Caroline fall in love. Just as life gets good, Pierre remembers he paid someone to kill him. He then desperately tries to call off the hit man.

After a series of mishaps and wild chases, Pierre survives and enjoys his happy new life with Caroline.

== Cast ==
- Louis de Funès : Pierre Cousin
- Noëlle Adam : Caroline Clément
- Jacques Jouanneau : Amédée
- Robert Manuel : Tony
- Nadine Tallier : Juliette, the hostess of "La belle vie"
- Christian Duvaleix : journalist
- Christian Méry : Angelo
- Louis Massy : photographer
- Léo Campion : Mr Ferdinand Boutiller, impresario and music publisher
- Pierre Stephen : police commissioner Bargeot
- Eddy Rasimi : porter at "La belle vie"
- Simone Berthier : Mrs Julie, the concierge
- Hubert Deschamps : bank manager
- Géo Dorlis : the manager of the nightclub "La belle vie"
- Albert Michel : gasman
- Roger Saget : policeman
- Pierre Tornade : Emile, a waiter
- Étienne Decroux : crazy astrologer
- Judith Magre : journalist
- Moustache : himself

== Production ==
Comme un cheveu sur la soupe is very loosely based on Jules Verne's novel Tribulations of a Chinaman in China, of which it only shares the premise of a man who pays for someone to end his life and then changes his mind.

It was the first starring role for Louis de Funès, who was then known primarily as a character actor. His appearance in the highly successful 1956 film La Traversée de Paris inspired producer Jules Borkon to cast him as the lead.

Shooting took place at the "Franstudio" film studios from December 26, 1956 until February 12, 1957.

== Reception ==
Comme un cheveu sur la soupe performed reasonably well commercially. It topped the French box-office during its opening week, although attendance dropped rapidly. It was the first of three films produced by Borkon with de Funès as the lead, the second being Ni vu, ni connu and the third Taxi, Roulotte et Corrida (both 1958).

== Home video ==
The film was released on DVD and Blu-ray It was also made available on streaming on various services, including Canal+, Orange and Apple TV.
