= Shadow and Light =

- Directed by: Henri Calef
- Written by: Solange Térac
- Produced by: Jean-Pierre Frogerais; Edmond Ténoudji
- Starring: Simone Signoret; María Casares; Jean Marchat
- Cinematography: Jean Bourgoin
- Edited by: Raymond Louveau
- Music by: Joseph Kosma
- Production companies: Les Films Marceau; Sigma-Vog
- Distributed by: Les Films Marceau
- Release date: 27 June 1951
- Running time: 92 minutes
- Country: France
- Language: French

Shadow and Light (French: Ombre et lumière) is a 1951 French psychological drama film directed by Henri Calef and starring Simone Signoret, María Casares and Jean Marchat.

The film's sets were designed by Daniel Guéret and Rino Mondellini. Simone Signoret's gowns were designed by Pierre Balmain.

== Cast ==
- Simone Signoret as Isabelle Leritz
- María Casares as Caroline Bessier
- Jean Marchat as Schurmann
- Pierre Dux as Docteur Gennari
- Albert Plantier as Eugène
- Germaine Reuver as La patronne
- Albert Michel as Le patron
- Jacques Berthier as Jacques Barroy
- René Berthier as Petit rôle
- Gérard Buhr as Le garçon de café
- Gérard Gervais as Petit rôle
- Yannick Muller
- Paul Villé as Le patron du restaurant

== Bibliography ==
- Hayward, Susan. Simone Signoret: The Star as Cultural Sign. Continuum, 2004.
