= Virgile (film) =

- Directed by: Carlo Rim
- Written by: Jean Lévitte; Carlo Rim; Raymond Vincy (libretto)
- Produced by: Jules Borkon
- Starring: Robert Lamoureux; Yves Robert; Fernand Sardou
- Cinematography: André Thomas
- Edited by: Monique Kirsanoff
- Music by: Georges Van Parys
- Production company: Champs-Élysées Productions
- Distributed by: Discifilm
- Release date: 18 November 1953
- Running time: 91 minutes
- Country: France
- Language: French

Virgile is a 1953 French comedy film directed by Carlo Rim and starring Robert Lamoureux, Yves Robert and Fernand Sardou.

The film's sets were designed by the art director Robert Clavel.

== Main cast ==
- Robert Lamoureux as François Virgile
- Yves Robert as Esposito
- Fernand Sardou as Latripe
- Albert Rémy as Bastien
- Geneviève Kervine as Jackie
- Elisabeth Hardy as La secrétaire
- Françoise Delbart as Furet
- Jeanne Véniat as La mère
- Bordas as La femme à barbe
- Rosy Varte as La grande Léa
- Jacques Hilling as Le professeur
- François Joux as Bourbaki
- Albert Michel as Trouillard
- Pierre Olaf as Furet
- Saturnin Fabre as Le président
- Françoise Prévost as Mimi la Rouquine
- Germaine Charley as La voisine
- Max Desrau Le ministre

== Bibliography ==
- Alfred Krautz. International directory of cinematographers, set- and costume designers in film, Volume 4. Saur, 1984.
