= A Lover's Return =

1946 film

- Film poster
- Directed by: Christian-Jaque
- Written by: Louis Chavance; Christian-Jaque; Henri Jeanson
- Produced by: Eduard Carles
- Starring: Louis Jouvet; Gaby Morlay; François Périer
- Cinematography: Christian Matras; Louis Page
- Edited by: Jacques Desagneaux
- Music by: Arthur Honegger
- Production company: Compagnie Franco Coloniale Cinématographique
- Distributed by: Les Films Corona
- Release date: 1 October 1946
- Running time: 100 minutes
- Country: France
- Language: French

A Lover's Return (French: Un revenant, French: Le revenant) is a 1946 French drama film directed by Christian-Jaque and starring Louis Jouvet, Gaby Morlay and François Périer. It was shot at the Cité Elgé in Paris and on location in Lyon. The film's sets were designed by the art director Pierre Marquet. It was entered into the 1946 Cannes Film Festival in September before its Lyon premiere and general release the following month.

== Plot ==
Jean-Jacques Sauvage, a theatre director believed dead by everyone, is back in Lyon.

== Cast ==
- Louis Jouvet as Jean-Jacques Sauvage
- Gaby Morlay as Geneviève Gonin
- François Périer as François Nisard
- Jean Brochard as Jérôme Nisard
- Ludmilla Tchérina as Karina
- Hélène Ronsard as La jeune femme
- Arthur Honegger as himself / En personne
- Léo Lapara as Marchal
- Armand Lurville as Le commissaire (as Lurville)
- Maurice Nasil as Le cousin
- Max Bozzoni as Serge
- Arthur Hoérée
- Louis Seigner as Edmond Gonin
- Marguerite Moreno as Tante Jeanne
