= The Counterfeiters of Paris =

Le cave se rebiffe / The Counterfeiters of Paris
- Directed by: Gilles Grangier
- Based on: Le Cave se rebiffe by Albert Simonin
- Produced by: Cité Films (Paris), Compagnia Cinematografica Mondiale (Rome)
- Starring: Jean Gabin; Bernard Blier; Martine Carol; Maurice Biraud
- Cinematography: Louis Page
- Edited by: Jacqueline Thiédot; Colette Charbonneau
- Music by: Francis Lemarque; Michel Legrand
- Distributed by: U.F.A. Comacico (France); Metro-Goldwyn-Mayer (Italy)
- Release date: September 27, 1961 (France)
- Running time: 98 minutes
- Countries: France; Italy
- Languages: French; German

Le cave se rebiffe is a 1961 French comedy film directed by Gilles Grangier, written by Michel Audiard and starring Jean Gabin, Bernard Blier and Martine Carol. The film was retitled The Counterfeiters of Paris for English-speaking countries.

Le cave se rebiffe is the second in the Max le Menteur trilogy, following Touchez pas au grisbi and preceding Les tontons flingueurs. The film trilogy is an adaptation of three novels written by Albert Simonin.

== Cast ==
- Jean Gabin : Ferdinand Maréchal, aka 'le Dabe'
- Bernard Blier : Charles Lepicard
- Martine Carol : Solange Mideau
- Franck Villard : Éric Masson
- Maurice Biraud : Robert Mideau (aka 'le Cave')
- Antoine Balpêtré : Lucas Malvoisin
- Ginette Leclerc : Léa Lepicard
- Françoise Rosay : Mme Pauline
- Albert Dinan : commissioner Rémy
- Gérard Buhr : detective Martin
- Heinrich Gretler : M. Tauchmann
- Clara Gansard : Georgette
- Robert Dalban : detective Maffeux
- Jacques Marin : detective Larpin
- Charles Bouillaud : engraver
- Marcel Charvey : doctor
- Paul Faivre : Mathias, concierge
- Hélène Dieudonné : wife, concierge
- Gabriel Gobin : horse trainer Vincennes
- René Hell : old garage owner
- Lisa Jouvet : nurse
- Albert Michel : postman
- Antonio Ramirez : horse trainer Caracas
- Pierre Collet : taxi driver
- Max Doria : customs officer
- Claude Ivry : Lucienne

== Plot ==
Éric, a crooked secondhand car dealer in Paris, is having an affair with the flirtatious Solange, whose unemployed husband Robert is a skilled printer and engraver. With two crooked friends, Charles and Lucas, he discusses the idea that they could use the ineffectual Robert to run off some counterfeit banknotes. For this they would need authentic paper and a reliable fence. In fact, they decide, they need to call in an expert and the best man for the job is Ferdinand, living in retirement in Venezuela.

Ferdinand agrees to help but on condition he has half the profits, which sets the other three working on a plot to reduce his take. Aware of their scheming, Ferdinand forms a close rapport with the shy Robert. When Robert has run off the counterfeit notes and delivered them to the fence, he is given an attaché case full of genuine notes which he takes to the airport. On boarding a plane for Venezuela, which has no extradition treaty with France, he finds Ferdinand waiting for him.

Humiliated and out of pocket, the three dupes descend to blows and then start slapping the faithless Solange who started it all.
