= Twelve Hours of Happiness =

1952 film

- Directed by: Gilles Grangier
- Written by: Jean-Paul Le Chanois; René Wheeler
- Based on: Twelve Hours of Happiness by Robert Boissy
- Produced by: Raoul Ploquin
- Starring: Dany Robin; Georges Marchal; Jean Tissier
- Cinematography: Marc Fossard
- Edited by: Madeleine Gug
- Music by: Georges Van Parys
- Production company: Les Films Raoul Ploquin
- Distributed by: La Société des Films Sirius
- Release date: 27 August 1952
- Running time: 79 minutes
- Country: France
- Language: French

Twelve Hours of Happiness (French: Douze heures de bonheur) is a 1952 French romantic comedy drama film directed by Gilles Grangier and starring Dany Robin, Georges Marchal and Jean Tissier. The film's sets were designed by the art director Robert Clavel. It is also known by the alternative title Jupiter.

== Synopsis ==
The daughter of a provincial pharmacist is due to marry her distant cousin Gilbert in an arranged marriage. However, she meets a stranger in the forest who has escaped from an asylum whom she dubs "Jupiter". He pretends to be her cousin and makes a good impression on the pharmacist. However complications ensue when the real cousin arrives.

== Cast ==
- Dany Robin as Yvette Cornet
- Georges Marchal as Jupiter' L'inconnu - l'évadé de lasile psychiatrique
- Jean Tissier as Benjamin Cornet
- Huguette Duflos as Clémence Cornet
- François Guérin as Gilbert Lantois
- Pierre Moncorbier as Le gendarme Mérovée
- Robert Seller
- Micheline Gary
- Floriane Prévot

== Bibliography ==
- Bessy, Maurice & Chirat, Raymond. Histoire du cinéma français: 1951–1955. Pygmalion, 1989.
- Rège, Philippe. Encyclopedia of French Film Directors, Volume 1. Scarecrow Press, 2009.
