= The Man from Cocody =

1965 film

- Film poster
- Directed by: Christian-Jaque
- Written by: Claude Rank; Christian-Jaque; Jacques Emmanuel; Jean Ferry
- Produced by: Roger Duchet
- Starring: Jean Marais; Liselotte Pulver; Philippe Clay
- Cinematography: Pierre Petit
- Edited by: Jacques Desagneaux
- Music by: Michel Magne
- Production companies: Euro-France Films; Gaumont International; Produzioni Cinematografiche Mediterranee
- Distributed by: Gaumont Distribution
- Release date: 2 April 1965 (France)
- Running time: 84 minutes
- Countries: France; Italy
- Language: French
- Box office: 2,027,645 admissions (France)

The Man from Cocody (French: Le gentleman de Cocody) is a 1965 French-Italian adventure film from 1965 It was directed by Christian-Jaque and starring Jean Marais, Liselotte Pulver and Philippe Clay. The screenplay was written by Christian-Jaque, Claude Rank, Jean Ferry and Jacques Emmanuel. It is set in Cocody on the Ivory Coast, where location shooting took place.

== Synopsis ==
Two rival gangs are hunting in the jungle of West Africa for a crashed plane filled with diamonds.

== Cast ==
- Jean Marais as Jean-Luc Hervé de la Tommeraye
- Liselotte Pulver as Baby
- Philippe Clay as Renaud Lefranc
- Nancy Holloway as Nancy
- Maria Grazia Buccella as Angelina
- Jacques Morel as Rouffignac
- Robert Dalban as Pepe
- Gil Delamare

== Bibliography ==
- Craig, Rob. American International Pictures: A Comprehensive Filmography. McFarland, 2019.
