= Nathalie, Secret Agent =

1959 film

- Directed by: Henri Decoin
- Written by: Pierre Apestéguy; Henri Jeanson; Jacques Robert
- Based on: Nathalie, agent secret by Franck Marchal
- Produced by: Roger de Broin
- Starring: Martine Carol; Félix Marten; Darío Moreno
- Cinematography: Robert Lefebvre
- Edited by: Claude Durand
- Music by: Georges Van Parys
- Production companies: Société Française de Cinématographie; La Société des Films Sirius
- Distributed by: La Société des Films Sirius
- Release date: 4 November 1959
- Running time: 96 minutes
- Countries: France; Italy
- Language: French

Nathalie, Secret Agent (French: Nathalie, agent secret US: Atomic Agent) is a 1959 French-Italian comedy thriller film directed by Henri Decoin and starring Martine Carol, Félix Marten and Darío Moreno. It is a sequel to the 1957 film Nathalie starring Carol in the title role with Dany Saval also reprising her role as Pivoine. It was shot at the Billancourt Studios in Paris. The film's sets were designed by the art director Robert Clavel.

== Synopsis ==
After her friend falls in love with an engineer, Parisian model Nathalie attends a demonstration at the top secret factory at which he works. She is then arrested by the security services who believe she is working as a spy for a foreign power. Escaping she enlists the help of a friendly police officer and sets out to trap the real spies.

== Cast ==
- Martine Carol as Nathalie Princesse
- Félix Marten as Jacques Fabre
- Darío Moreno as Docteur Alberto / Don José
- Noël Roquevert as Pierre Darbon
- Howard Vernon as William Dantoren
- Jacques Berthier as Jean Darbon
- André Versini as François Pellec
- Dany Saval as Pivoine
- Guy Decomble as Pageot
- Catherine Conti as La vendeuse de cigarettes

== Bibliography ==
- Chiti, Roberto & Poppi, Roberto. Dizionario del cinema italiano: Dal 1945 al 1959. Gremese Editore, 1991.
- Goble, Alan. The Complete Index to Literary Sources in Film. Walter de Gruyter, 1999.
