= Lola Montès =

- French theatrical release poster
- Directed by: Max Ophüls
- Screenplay by: Max Ophüls; Annette Wademant; Jacques Natanson
- Based on: La vie extraordinaire de Lola Montès by Cécil Saint-Laurent
- Produced by: Albert Caraco
- Starring: Martine Carol; Peter Ustinov; Anton Walbrook
- Cinematography: Christian Matras
- Edited by: Madeleine Gug
- Music by: Georges Auric
- Distributed by: Gamma Film (France); Union-Film-Verleih (West Germany)
- Release dates: 23 December 1955 (France); 12 January 1956 (West Germany)
- Running time: 114 minutes (original, lost version); 110 minutes/114 minutes (restored versions)
- Countries: France; West Germany
- Languages: French; German; English
- Budget: US$1,500,000

Lola Montès is a 1955 historical romance film, and the last completed film of director Max Ophüls. Based on Cécil Saint-Laurent's novel La vie extraordinaire de Lola Montès, the film depicts the life of Irish dancer and courtesan Lola Montez (1821–1861), portrayed by Martine Carol, and tells the story of her many notorious affairs, most notably those with Franz Liszt and Ludwig I of Bavaria. A co-production between France and West Germany, the dialogue is mostly in French and German, with a few English-language sequences.

The most expensive European film produced up to its time, Lola Montès underperformed at the box office but had a significant artistic influence on the French New Wave movement and has many distinguished critical admirers. Heavily reedited (multiple times) and shortened after its initial release for commercial reasons, it has been twice restored (in 1968 and 2008). The film was released on DVD and Blu-ray in North America by The Criterion Collection in February 2010.

== Plot ==
In New Orleans in the 1850s, a whip-wielding ringmaster announces to the crowd the “attraction of the century” and “the most interesting predator” of his circus: the former royal mistress Maria Dolores Porriz y Montez, Countess von Landsfeld, known as Lola Montez. Richly adorned, she is carried into the ring to take questions from the audience. Each question costs 25 cents, which are not intended as a payment for Lola, as the ringmaster announces, since she will donate them to a correctional home for fallen women. The crowd shouts questions to Lola about her waist size and affairs, but the ringmaster answers them humorously. A parade begins, with the circus performers representing Lola's lovers. The question of whether she still remembers the past leads Lola to flash back to her affair with the composer Franz Liszt.

=== The affair with Franz Liszt ===
Liszt and Lola are on their way to Rome in his lavish carriage, and the composer, who writes pieces for Lola to dance to, notices that they are being followed by her own carriage, so that Lola can leave at any time. The couple spend the night in an inn, and, when he thinks Lola is asleep, Liszt writes a farewell note that includes a short musical piece. But as he tries to leave the common room, Lola catches him, and they make love one more time. The next morning, Lola gathers up the pieces of Liszt's composition, and they part ways, Liszt saying that she at least remains faithful to his music.

=== Childhood and youth ===
The ringmaster announces a change of scene and costume, as they will now depict Lola's childhood and youth. A flashback shows young Lola and her mother boarding a ship back to Europe from India after her father's death. Her mother has a cabin to herself so her lover, Lieutenant James, can visit her; Lola has to sleep in the dormitory with other girls. In Paris, her mother wants Lola to marry an old baron who was the family's banker. To avoid this, she escapes with James, who confesses his love to her, and they marry.

At the beginning of the circus's second act, the ringmaster claims the marriage was happy, but a flashback shows that after five years Lola fled from her violent, constantly drunk and cheating husband. This is followed by Lola's subsequent life, depicted in the ring by elaborate tableaux vivants and acted scenes. Lola makes her debut as a dancer in Madrid, is kidnapped by a rich Russian, whose love she rejected, and is freed by the intervention of the French ambassador. During these performances, a doctor talks with the circus manager, who is still dressed as a clown and counting the daily profits. The doctor warns that Lola's heart is weak and he is concerned for her well-being, particularly given her act's dangerous finale.

Lola begins to tell her story herself, though she forgets her lines and has to be prompted by the ringmaster. She relates how she danced in Tivoli and was in love with the conductor of the orchestra, and a short flashback shows how she found out onstage that he was married, so she interrupted the performance to slap him and expose him in front of his wife. After that, she became a celebrity on the French Riviera and was visited by a parade of suitors, and the ringmaster visited her to offer her a contract with his circus, which she refused.

Back in the circus, while the list of Lola's increasingly powerful lovers is read out, including Richard Wagner, Frédéric Chopin, Count von Lichtenfeld, and Louis II, Grand Duke of Hesse, she swings ever higher on a trapeze structure until she reaches a platform at the top of the tent, where a performer dressed as King Ludwig I of Bavaria awaits her.

=== Lola and Ludwig I of Bavaria ===
The extended flashback of Lola's time in Bavaria begins with her offering a handsome student hiking in the snowy mountains a ride in her carriage if he will show her the way to Munich. He agrees, though he had been headed in the opposite direction. Lola hopes to get a position dancing at the Bavarian royal theater, but she is not hired, as they do not like her Spanish style of dancing. As she walks the streets after her failed audition, she is approached by a soldier in the king's regiment, and they begin an affair, as she hopes he will help her meet the king.

After several weeks, Lola loses her patience and simply charges at King Ludwig on her horse during a military parade. Instead of being punished, she is granted a private audience with Ludwig, during which she complains about the stodginess of the people who did not hire her and clears any doubts about her figure by tearing open her bodice. Ludwig arranges for her to perform at the National Theatre, after which he offers her a permanent position, but she says she has proved she can dance and is leaving. He keeps her at court by commissioning a portrait of her and continually delaying its completion, and she becomes his mistress.

Gradually, Lola begins to influence Ludwig's politics. During the March Revolution of 1848, the citizens rebel against her, and she flees across the border to Austria at night with the help of the student she met on the way to Munich. She rejects the possibility of a simple life as the student's wife, saying that something has broken in her and she is no longer capable of love.

=== Finale ===
The ringmaster announces that, after this, Lola remembered his offer to work together and joined the circus. She has been performing every day for four months, ending her act by jumping from the top platform onto a padded mat—without a net. The doctor asks the manager and ringmaster to keep the net this time, but the ringmaster fears disappointing the audience and removes it. Although she seems to be struggling to remain conscious, Lola successfully performs her leap. After the show, she sits in a cage, while the male spectators wait in line to kiss her hand for a dollar.

== Cast ==
- Martine Carol as Lola Montez
- Peter Ustinov as the ringmaster
- Anton Walbrook as King Ludwig I of Bavaria
- Henri Guisol as Maurice, Lola's coachman
- Lise Delamare as Mrs. Craigie, Lola's mother
- Paulette Dubost as Josephine, Lola's maid
- Oskar Werner as a Bavarian student
- Ivan Desny as Lieutenant Thomas James, Lola's first husband
- Jean Galland as the elderly baron's private secretary
- Will Quadflieg as Franz Liszt
- Héléna Manson as Lieutenant James' sister
- Germaine Delbat as a stewardess
- Carl Esmond (credited as Willy Eichberger) as Lola's doctor
- Jacques Fayet as the young ship steward
- Friedrich Domin as the circus manager
- Werner Finck as Wisböck, the painter of Lola's portrait
- Elinor von Wallerstein as Queen Therese (uncredited)
- Gustav Waldau as Professor Jeppner, Ludwig's ear doctor (uncredited)
- Margarete Haagen as Anna Jeppner, Professor Jeppner's wife and assistant (uncredited)
- Willy Rösner as the Bavarian prime minister (uncredited)

== Production ==
Lola Montès was planned as a major project to put the theory of European film into practice. Therefore, it was shot in French, German, and English. Ophüls was initially critical of the material, but, after studying Lola Montez's biography, he began to work on the script, planning to make a black-and-white film.

The production companies expected the film to be a success right from the start, and cast it with top-class actors. Martine Carol, a French sex symbol in the 1950s, was hired in September 1954, and received a fee of around 350,000 marks; Anton Walbrook's fee was 100,000 marks. Since Ophüls wanted the film to revolve around the idea of a circus in which Lola answers questions about her life in front of an audience seated around the ring, the production and distribution departments decided to shoot in color. The production company had prepared fixed-time contracts with the actors, but filming was delayed because Ophüls agreed to make the film in color only after doing extensive tests. He also rewrote the script to incorporate color.

As CinemaScope films were becoming increasingly popular in the mid-1950s, it was also decided that this "prestige project" would be filmed in the then-new recording format. This decision resulted in further changes to the script, which ultimately also meant high costs for contract extensions for the actors, some of whom did not experience a single day of filming during their first contract period. Looking back, Peter Ustinov said: "I started to work two days before the contract was over".

The first day of shooting took place in mid-February 1955. The shooting locations included Paris, Nice, Schloss Weißenstein in Pommersfelden, Bamberg, and Bavaria Studios in Munich.

Since, in return for agreeing to shoot in CinemaScope, Ophüls obtained the assurance that "all technical and artistic resources would be made available to him", the film's cost rose to unprecedented heights for the time. Paths were artificially colored to maintain the film's ingenious color concept; for a shot in which snow was needed, the set was taken to the High Tauern; and costumes had to be reworked when the scene of Ludwig's parade at the Monopteros in the Englischer Garten was switched from winter to summer. For the circus scenes, a permanent circus building was constructed, since the building used by Munich's Circus Krone was not tall enough to accommodate Ophüls's ideas and the Circus Brumbach was already busy with artists and animals. Shooting each scene separately in French, German, and English also increased production costs and shooting time. Despite all this, Reinegger, the distributor of Union-Film, completed the production thanks to two circumstances: the film had been insured against exceeding the scheduled 82-day shoot due to force majeure, and the Heimatfilm Der Förster vom Silberwald (1954) had recently succeeded at the box office.

By the time of its premiere, the film had cost 7.2 million marks. In a 1955 interview, Ophüls said:

Whatever sum you will hear, don't forget to divide it by three. Because basically we are shooting three films, one German, one English and one French, since all three versions are shot one after the other with the original cast. So each of the three films will cost a sum that by no means can be called unusual.

== Release ==
Lola Montès was the last film directed by Ophüls before his death of a heart attack in March 1957. As originally shown in France in 1955, the audience sees the events of Lola's life in flashbacks. Use of the technique was criticized upon its release, and the film did poorly at the box office. In response, the producers recut the film and shortened it in favor of a more chronological storyline, against the director's wishes.

According to Roger Ebert, a "savagely butchered version was in circulation for a few years" after Ophüls died. The film critic Andrew Sarris and others showed improved versions, closer to the original, at the New York Film Festival in 1963 and 1968.

=== Restoration ===
Certain elements removed from the film negative by the producers went missing and were believed lost, but their later discovery allowed the film to be reedited according to Ophüls's intentions. The reedit was digitally restored by a small team of restoration artists, including John Healy at Technicolor under the direction of Tom Burton. A black-and-white version of the film was also repaired by Martina Müller and Werner Dütsch.

The restored film was shown at the New York Film Festival from September 26 to October 12, 2008, before being rereleased by Rialto Pictures in November. It was screened in its full Cinemascope aspect ratio, and included five minutes of additional footage never before shown in any U.S. release of the film.

Lola Montès was released on DVD and Blu-ray in North America by The Criterion Collection in February 2010.

== Legacy ==
Ebert lauded the film's camerawork and set design, but felt that Carol's "wooden [and] shallow" performance as the titular character prevented the film from achieving greatness. Nonetheless, today it is among Ophüls's most revered works, with Dave Kehr calling it a masterpiece and writing, "certainly this story of a courtesan's life is among the most emotionally plangent, visually ravishing works the cinema has to offer." The film received five votes in the British Film Institute's 2012 Sight & Sound critics' poll, and Danny Peary's 1981 book Cult Movies acclaims it as one of the 100 most-representative examples of the cult film phenomenon.

On the review aggregator website Rotten Tomatoes, 82% of 34 critics' reviews are positive. The website's consensus reads: "A panoramic opus on celebrity that pops with vivid colors, Lola Montés is a narratively loose and visually splendid swan song for director Max Ophüls."

== Bibliography ==
- Müller, Martina; Dütsch, Werner (2002). Drößler, Stefan (ed.). Lola Montez: eine Filmgeschichte (in German). München: König Drößler, Filmmuseum München. ISBN 978-3-88375-587-8.
