= Gilles Grangier =

French film director (1911–1996)

- Born: 5 May 1911; Paris, France
- Died: 27 April 1996 (aged 84); Suresnes, France
- Occupations: Film director, screenwriter
- Years active: 1944–1985

Gilles Grangier (5 May 1911 – 27 April 1996) was a French film director and screenwriter. He directed more than 50 films and several TV series between 1943 and 1985. His film Archimède le clochard was entered into the 9th Berlin International Film Festival, where Jean Gabin won the Silver Bear for Best Actor. He had the most number of successful films at the French box office between 1945 and 2001 with 42 of his films having admissions of 500,000 or more, more than any other.

== Selected filmography ==
- Trente et Quarante (1945)
- The Black Cavalier (1945)
- The Adventure of Cabassou (1946)
- Lessons in Conduct (1946)
- Rendezvous in Paris (1947)
- Something to Sing About (1947)
- Danger of Death (1947)
- Woman Without a Past (1948)
- I'm the Romance (1949)
- Amédée (1950)
- The Little Zouave (1950)
- Women Are Crazy (1950)
- The Happy Man (1950)
- The Straw Lover (1950)
- The Little Cardinals (1951)
- The Prettiest Sin in the World (1951)
- Love, Madame (1952)
- Twelve Hours of Happiness (1952)
- Young Maries (1953)
- Rhine Virgin (1953)
- Faites-moi confiance (1954)
- Poisson d'avril (1954)
- Gas-Oil (1955)
- Spring, Autumn and Love (1955)
- Blood to the Head (1956)
- The Schemer (1957)
- Speaking of Murder (1957)
- Three Days to Live (1957)
- Not Delivered (1958)
- Le désordre et la nuit (1958)
- 125 Rue Montmartre (1959)
- Archimède le clochard (1959)
- The Old Guard (1960)
- The Counterfeiters of Paris (1961)
- The Gentleman from Epsom (1962)
- La Cuisine au Beurre (1963)
- The Trip to Biarritz (1963)
- Maigret Sees Red (1963)
- That Tender Age (1964)
- How to Keep the Red Lamp Burning (1965)
- Operation Double Cross (1965)
- Under the Sign of the Bull (1969)
- Quentin Durward (1971, TV series)
