= Under the Sign of the Bull =

1969 film

- Directed by: Gilles Grangier
- Written by: Roger Vrigny (novel); François Boyer; Gilles Grangier; Michel Audiard; Claude Sautet
- Produced by: Alain Poiré
- Starring: Jean Gabin; Suzanne Flon; Colette Deréal
- Cinematography: Walter Wottitz
- Edited by: Jacqueline Sadoul
- Music by: Jean Prodromidès
- Production company: Gaumont
- Distributed by: Gaumont Distribution
- Release date: 28 March 1969
- Running time: 81 minutes
- Country: France
- Language: French

Under the Sign of the Bull (French: Sous le signe du taureau) is a 1969 French drama film directed by Gilles Grangier and starring Jean Gabin, Suzanne Flon and Colette Deréal. It was shot at the Saint-Maurice Studios in Paris. The film's sets were designed by the art director Robert Clavel.

== Cast ==
- Jean Gabin as Albert Raynal - un constructeur de fusées
- Suzanne Flon as Christine Raynal - sa femme
- Colette Deréal as Rolande - une restauratrice
- Raymond Gérôme as Jérôme Laprade - le beau-frère d'Albert
- Fernand Ledoux as Le juge
- Jacques Monod as L'industriel Marchal
- Alfred Adam as Vacher - le ferrailleur
- Michel Auclair as Le banquier Magnin
- Marthe Alycia as Mme Laprade Mère
- Louis Arbessier as Aupagneur
- Etienne Bierry as Lambert - un technicien
- Jean-Paul Moulinot as Pierre - le valet d'Augagneur
- Max Amyl as Le commissaire de Rouen
- Yves Arcanel as Le chef-mécanicien de Raynal
- André Badin as Un cuisinier
- René Bouloc as Jean-Pierre Raynal
- Robert Dalban as Le cafetier
- Jean-Pierre Hercé as Le cadet de Raynal
- Sophie Leclair as La dactylo
- Armand Meffre as Un ingénieur chez Raynal
- Albert Michel as Le bistrot des ferrailleurs
- Jean-Simon Prévost as Le financier
- Jean Thielment as Maître d'hôtel
- France Valéry as Gilberte Magnin - la femme d'un banquier
- Philippe Vallauris as Le secrétaire de Marchall
- Jean Valmence as Helmann - un commanditaire de Raynal
- Dominique Viriot as L'autostoppeur anglais

== Bibliography ==
- Harriss, Joseph. Jean Gabin: The Actor Who Was France. McFarland, 2018.
