= La Tour, prends garde! =

1958 film

- Directed by: Georges Lampin
- Written by: Claude Accursi; Denys de La Patellière
- Produced by: Véga Films
- Starring: Jean Marais; Eleonora Rossi Drago
- Music by: Maurice Thiriet; Georges Van Parys
- Release date: 26 February 1958 (France)
- Running time: 82 minutes
- Countries: France, Yugoslavia, Italy
- Language: French
- Box office: 2,311,061 admissions (France)

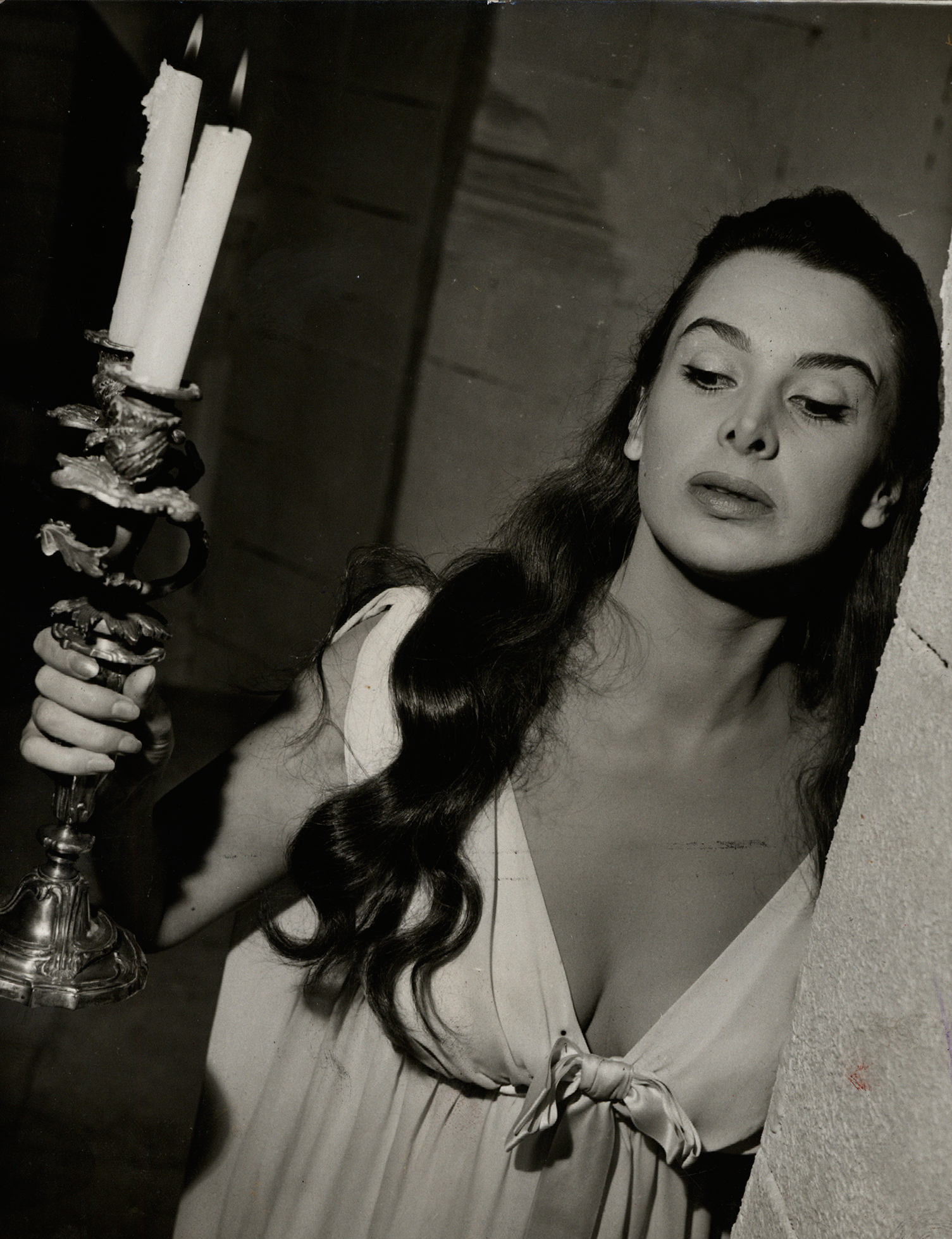
Eleonora Rossi Drago

La Tour, prends garde! (La Tour, watch out!) is a 1958 French adventure drama film directed by Georges Lampin, written by Claude Accursi, starring Jean Marais. The film was known under the title King on Horseback (US), Des Königs bester Mann (West Germany), and Killer Spy (international English title).

== Cast ==
- Jean Marais : Henri La Tour
- Eleonora Rossi Drago : Countess Malvina of Amalfi
- Nadja Tiller : Mirabelle
- Cathia Caro : Antoinette de Saint-Sever "Toinon"
- Jean Parédès : Nicolas Taupin
- Renaud Mary : Pérouge
- Robert Dalban : Barberin
- Christian Duvaleix : Passelacet
- Yves Massard : Marquis François de Marmande
- Marcel Pérès : Chamonet
- Jean-Pierre Léaud : Pierrot
- Raoul Delfosse : Bravaccio
- Paul-Emile Deiber : Duc Philippe de Saint-Sever
- Jean Lara : Louis XV
- Sonia Hlebsova/Klebs : L'impératrice Marie-Thérèse d'Autriche
- Roger Saget : Maréchal de Noailles
- Liliane Bert : Duchesse de Châteauroux
- Jacques Marin : Aristide Cornilion (non crédité)
- Dominique Davray : Une invitée de Taupin (non créditée)
- Albert Michel : L'invité de Taupin (non crédité)
- Monette Dinay : M^{me} Taupin (non créditée)
- Albert Daumergue : Un policier du roi
