= Gas-Oil =

1955 film

- Directed by: Gilles Grangier
- Written by: Michel Audiard; Gilles Grangier
- Based on: Du raisin dans le gaz-oil by Georges Bayle
- Produced by: Jean-Paul Guibert
- Starring: Jean Gabin; Jeanne Moreau; Gaby Basset; Ginette Leclerc
- Cinematography: Pierre Montazel
- Edited by: Jacqueline Thiédot
- Music by: Henri Crolla
- Production company: Intermondia Films
- Distributed by: Rank
- Release date: 9 November 1955
- Running time: 92 minutes
- Country: France
- Language: French

Gas-Oil is a 1955 French crime drama film directed by Gilles Grangier and starring Jean Gabin, Jeanne Moreau, Gaby Basset and Ginette Leclerc. It was shot at the Epinay Studios in Paris and on location at a variety of places. The film's sets were designed by the art director Jacques Colombier. It was one of a number of films portraying tough truck drivers made in the wake of the success of the 1953 film The Wages of Fear. It was the first of many films in which Gabin appeared in written by his fellow Parisian Michel Audiard.

== Synopsis ==
While driving home one night after meeting his girlfriend, trucker Jean Chape encounters a dead body lying in the road. He reports it the police but they suspect that he is responsible.

== Cast ==
- Jean Gabin as Jean Chape
- Jeanne Moreau as Alice
- Gaby Basset as Camille Serin
- Ginette Leclerc as Mme Scoppo
- Simone Berthier as Annie, une serveuse
- Charles Bouillaud as Le gendarme dactylographe
- Marcel Bozzuffi as Pierrot Ragondin
- Robert Dalban as Félix
- Albert Dinan as Émile Serin
- Gilbert Edard as Un commissaire
- Camille Guérini as Lucien Ragondin
- Guy Henry as Jojo, un routier
- Roger Hanin as René Schwob
- Bob Ingarao as Un gangster
- Jean Lefebvre as Le chauffeur de car
- Lisette Lebon as Mauricette, une serveuse
- Jacques Marin as Un gendarme au commissariat
- Germaine Michel as Maria Ragondin, la mère de Pierrot
- Albert Michel as Le facteur
- Marcel Pérès as Le barbier
- Jean-Marie Rivière as Un gangster
- Henri Crémieux as Le premier commissaire

== Bibliography ==
- Frey, Hugo. Nationalism and the Cinema in France: Political Mythologies and Film Events, 1945-1995. Berghahn Books, 2014.
- Harriss, Joseph. Jean Gabin: The Actor Who Was France. McFarland, 2018.
