= The Lace Wars =

- Directed by: René Clair
- Written by: René Clair
- Starring: Jean-Pierre Cassel; Philippe Avron; Marie Dubois
- Cinematography: Alexandru David; Daniel Diot; Grigore Ionescu; Christian Matras
- Edited by: Louisette Hautecoeur
- Music by: Georges Van Parys
- Production companies: Gaumont International; Studioul Cinematografic Bucuresti
- Distributed by: Gaumont Distribution
- Release date: 12 December 1965
- Running time: 90 minutes
- Countries: France; Romania
- Language: French

The Lace Wars (French: Les fêtes galantes) is a 1965 French-Romanian historical comedy film directed by René Clair and starring Jean-Pierre Cassel, Philippe Avron and Marie Dubois. It was the final film of Clair's over forty year career.

== Plot ==
In the 18th century, as the army of Prince de Beaulieu lays siege on the fortress of Marechal d'Allenberg, a young princess sends a soldier out of the fortress to go find her lover.

== Cast ==
- Jean-Pierre Cassel as Jolicoeur
- Philippe Avron as Thomas
- Marie Dubois as Divine - la actrice
- Geneviève Casile as Hélène - la princesse
- Jean Richard as Le Prince de Beaulieu
- György Kovács as Le Maréchal d'Allenberg
- Fory Etterle
- Elena Caragiu
- Adela Marculescu
- Melania Cârje
- Florin Vasiliu
- Christian Baratier as Frédéric
- Jean Payen
- Alfred Adam as Le sergent Bel-Oeil
- Matei Alexandru
- Lucia Amram
- Mircea Balaban
- Michael Berechet
- Mihai Mereuta
- Dem Rădulescu
- Grigore Vasiliu-Birlic

== Bibliography ==
- Celia McGerr. René Clair. Twayne Publishers, 1980.
