= Martine Carol =

French actress (1920–1967)

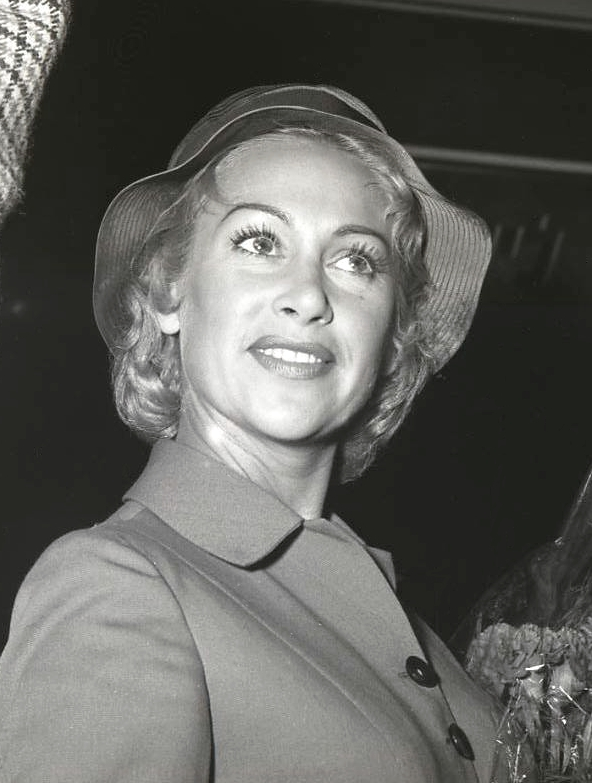
- Carol in 1963
- Born: Marie-Louise Jeanne Nicolle Mourer; 16 May 1920; Saint-Mandé, France
- Died: 6 February 1967 (aged 46); Monte Carlo, Monaco
- Other names: Marise Arley, Martine Carole, Marie-Louise Maurer
- Occupation: Actress
- Years active: 1941–1967
- Spouses: Joseph Stephen Crane (m. 1948; div. 1953) Christian-Jaque (m. 1954; div. 1959) André Rouveix (m. 1959; div. 1962) Mike Eland (m. 1966)

Martine Carol (born Marie-Louise Jeanne Nicolle Mourer; 16 May 1920 – 6 February 1967) was a French film actress. She frequently was cast as an elegant blonde seductress. During the late 1940s and early 1950s, she was the leading sex symbol and a top box-office draw of French cinema, and she was considered a French version of America's Marilyn Monroe. One of her more famous roles was as the title character in Lola Montès (1955), directed by Max Ophüls, in a role that required dark hair. However, by late 1956, roles for Carol had become fewer, partly because of the introduction of Brigitte Bardot.

== Early life ==
Born Maryse Mourer (or Marie-Louise Jeanne Nicolle Mourer) in Saint-Mandé, Val-de-Marne, she studied acting under René Simon, making her stage début in 1940.

After uncredited bits in The Last of the Six (1941) and The Strangers in the House (1942) she had her credited movie part in 1943, La ferme aux loups.

== Career ==
Carol had support roles in L'extravagante mission (1945), Bifur 3 (1945) and Trente et quarante (1946), then was in Miroir (1947) with Jean Gabin, and Voyage surprise (1947). She achieved fame on stage in a production of Tobacco Road. Carol received a lot of publicty because of her private life.

She had the female lead in En êtes-vous bien sûr? (1947) with Robert Dhéry and followed it with Carré de valets (1947) and La fleur de l'âge (1947) for Marcel Carne. Carol was in Sextette (1948) for Robert Hennion and had a support part in The Lovers of Verona (1949), a version of Romeo and Juliet from André Cayatte, playing a movie star. She had the female lead in I Like Only You (1949) for Pierre Montazel and played herself in We Will All Go to Paris (1950).

=== Stardom ===
Carol starred in Une nuit de noces (1950), Beware of Blondes (1950) and the popular historical comedy Dear Caroline (1951) which was controversial because of outfits she wore. The film turned Carol into a star and all the scenes where she had showers led her to be nicknamed "The Cleanest Woman in Paris". She played a movie star in the French-Spanish film Love and Desire (1952) and had the lead in Adorable Creatures (1952), directed by Christian-Jaque who became her husband in 1954.

Carol co starred with Gerard Philippe in Beauties of the Night (1952) for Rene Clair.

Carol played the title role in A Caprice of Darling Caroline (1953), a sequel to Darling Caroline. She played a series of true life women: Lucrèce Borgia (1953) as Lucrezia Borgia, a big local hit, and Madame du Barry (1954), as Madame du Barry for Christian-Jaque. She played herself in Boum sur Paris (1953).

Carol had the title role in Nana (1955) from the novel by Emile Zola, alongside Charles Boyer. A contemporary article called her the French "Queen of Sex". She was in two all star anthology films: Daughters of Destiny (1954), as Lysistrata with her segment directed by her husband and co starring Raf Vallone, and The Bed (1954). She reteamed with Vallone in the Italian comedy The Beach (1954).

=== International career ===
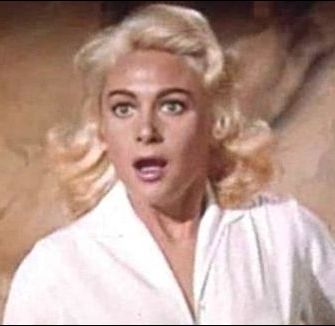
Carol in Action of the Tiger (1957)

Carol took the female lead in The French, They Are a Funny Race (1955), the last film from director Preston Sturges, alongside Jack Buchanan. The movie was shot in English and French versions and was a hit in France but not in English speaking countries.

Carol played Lola Montez in Lola Montès (1955) for Max Ophuls opposite Peter Ustinov and Anton Walbrook. This was the most expensive European film at the time, and was shot in French, English and German. It was considered a box office disappointment but was widely seen. She was linked to a possible Hollywood film Lord Vanity at Fox but it was never made.

Carol made Defend My Love (1956), an Italian comedy with Gabriele Ferzetti, and had a cameo in Around the World in 80 Days (1956).

Carol's first proper English language film was Action of the Tiger (1957) with Van Johnson directed by Terence Young. Carol starred in an Italian-French comedy film for her husband, Nathalie (1957) which was popular enough for a sequel, Nathalie, Secret Agent (1959). In between these she went to Tahiti to star in an Australian-French adventure tale, The Stowaway (1958), alongside Roger Livesey and Karl Boehm, which was shot in English and French versions.

Carol starred in Venetian Honeymoon (1959) with Vittorio de Sica and Claudia Cardinale then was the lead in a Hollywood movie shot in Germany, Ten Seconds to Hell (1959) with Jeff Chandler and Jack Palance for director Robert Aldrich. She was Joséphine de Beauharnais in Abel Gance's The Battle of Austerlitz (1960), very popular in France.

=== Later career ===
Carol was one of several stars in Love and the Frenchwoman (1961) then starred in One Night on the Beach (1961). She supported Jean Gabin in The Counterfeiters of Paris (1961) and made The Betrayer (1962) for Roberto Rossellini. Carol then made Operation Gold Ingot (1962), and Beach Casanova (1962) with Curt Jurgens.

Carol's final film was Hell Is Empty (1967), a British movie alongside Anthony Steel, James Robertson Justice and Shirley Ann Field. It began filming in 1965 under the direction of Bernard Knowles. It was Martine Carol's first movie in three years. Filming was suspended due to lack of funds. Carol died of a heart attack in February 1967 and production resumed under the direction of John Ainsworth after her death.

== Personal life ==
Despite her fame and fortune, Martine Carol's personal life was filled with turmoil that included a suicide attempt, drug abuse, and four marriages. She also was kidnapped by gangster Pierre Loutrel (also known as Pierrot le Fou or Crazy Pete), albeit briefly and received roses the next day as an apology.

Carol was married four times, including:

- Joseph Stephen Crane, American actor and restaurant manager, previously Lana Turner's husband, married in 1948, divorced in 1953.
- Christian-Jaque, film director, married July 15, 1954, divorced in 1959.
- Dr. André Rouveix, a young doctor she met in Martinique, Fort-de-France, married August 3, 1959, divorced in 1962.
- Mike Eland, English businessman, married in 1966 until her death.

Carol died unexpectedly of a heart attack in a hotel room in Monte Carlo at the age of 46. She was first buried in Paris's Père Lachaise Cemetery, but after her grave was vandalized—some media reported that she had been interred with her jewels—was reburied in the Grand Jas Cemetery of Cannes (square no. 3).

== Filmography ==
Year	Title	Role	Director	Notes
1941	The Last of the Six	Une femme	Georges Lacombe	uncredited
1942	The Strangers in the House	Une spectatrice aux Assises	Henri Decoin	uncredited
1943	La ferme aux loups	Micky	Richard Pottier	
1945	Bifur 3	Germaine	Maurice Cam	
1945	L'extravagante mission	Stella Star	Henri Calef	
1946	Trente et quarante	Madeleine Bitterlin	Gilles Grangier	
1947	Mirror	Lulu	Raymond Lamy	
1947	Mystery Trip	Isabelle Grosbois	Pierre Prévert	
1947	Are You Sure?	Caroline	Jacques Houssin	
1947	Four Knaves	Catherine Bonpain	André Berthomieu	
1947	La fleur de l'âge		Marcel Carné	
1948	Memories Are Not for Sale	Sonia	Robert Hennion	
1949	The Lovers of Verona	Bettina Verdi	André Cayatte	
1949	I Like Only You	Irène	Pierre Montazel	
1950	We Will All Go to Paris	Martine Carol	Jean Boyer	
1950	Wedding Night	Sidonie de Valpurgis	René Jayet	
1950	Beware of Blondes	Olga Schneider	André Hunebelle	
1951	Darling Caroline	Caroline de Bièvre	Richard Pottier	
1952	Love and Desire	Martine - la star	Henri Decoin	
1952	Adorable Creatures	Minouche	Christian-Jaque	
1952	Beauties of the Night	Edmee	René Clair	
1953	A Caprice of Darling Caroline	Caroline de Bièvre	Jean Devaivre	
1953	Lucrèce Borgia	Lucrèce Borgia	Christian-Jacque	
1953	Boum sur Paris	Herself	Maurice de Canonge	
1954	Destinées	Lysistrata	Christian-Jacque	segment: "Lysistrata"
1954	Royal Affairs in Versailles	La duchesse de Bouillon	Sacha Guitry	scenes deleted
1954	The Beach	Anna Maria Mentorsi	Alberto Lattuada	
1954	The Bed	Agnès de Rungis	Ralph Habib; Henri Decoin; Gianni Franciolini; Jean Delannoy	segment: "Lit de la Pompadour"
1954	Madame du Barry	Madame du Barry	Christian-Jacque	
1955	Nana	Nana	Christian-Jacque	
1955	Les Carnets du Major Thompson	Martine Thompson	Preston Sturges	
1955	Lola Montès	Lola Montès	Max Ophüls	
1956	Difendo il mio amore	Elisa Leonardi	Giulio Macchi	
1956	Around the World in 80 Days	Girl in Paris Railroad Station	Michael Anderson	cameo
1957	Action of the Tiger	Tracy Malvoisie	Terence Young	
1957	Nathalie	Nathalie Princesse	Christian-Jaque	
1958	The Stowaway	Colette	Lee Robinson and Ralph Habib	
1959	Venetian Honeymoon	Isabelle dos Santos	Alberto Cavalcanti	
1959	Ten Seconds to Hell	Margot Hofer	Robert Aldrich	
1959	Nathalie, Secret Agent	Nathalie Princesse	Henri Decoin	
1960	Austerlitz	Joséphine de Beauharnais	Abel Gance	
1960	Love and the Frenchwoman	Eliane Girard	Michel Boisrond; Christian-Jaque; René Clair; Henri Decoin; Jean Delannoy; Jean-Paul Le Chanois; Henri Verneuil	segment: "Femme seule"
1961	Un soir sur la plage	Georgina	Michel Boisrond	
1961	The Counterfeiters of Paris	Solange Mideau	Gilles Grangier	
1961	Vanina Vanini	Contessa Vitelleschi	Roberto Rossellini	
1962	Operation Gold Ingot	Kathy	Georges Lautner	
1962	I Don Giovanni della Costa Azzurra	Nadine Leblanc	Vittorio Sala	
1966	Lasciapassare per l'inferno		George Fuller	
1967	Hell Is Empty	Martine Grant	Bernard Knowles	Released Posthumously

== Bibliography ==
- Debot, Georges (1979). Martine Carol ou la vie de Martine chérie. Préface de Mary Marquet. Paris: France-Empire.
- Cohen, André-Charles (1986). Martine chérie. Collection photographique de Jean-Charles Sabria. Préface de Cécil Saint-Laurent. Paris: Ramsay.
