= The Majordomo =

1965 film

- Directed by: Jean Delannoy
- Written by: Henri Jeanson; Jacques Robert; Jean Delannoy
- Produced by: Mario Cecchi Gori; Hélène Dassonville; Jean Delannoy
- Starring: Paul Meurisse; Geneviève Page; Paul Hubschmid
- Cinematography: Christian Matras
- Edited by: Henri Taverna
- Music by: Paul Misraki
- Production companies: Ceres Films; Cocinor; Fair Film; Les Films Corona; Les Films Marceau
- Distributed by: Cocinor
- Release date: 23 March 1965
- Running time: 93 minutes
- Countries: France; Italy
- Language: French

The Majordomo (French: Le Majordome, Italian: Operazione maggiordomo) is a 1965 French-Italian comedy film directed by Jean Delannoy and starring Paul Meurisse, Geneviève Page and Paul Hubschmid. It was shot at the Billancourt Studios in Paris. The film's sets were designed by the art director Paul-Louis Boutié.

== Synopsis ==
Léopold, the valet of a celebrated lawyer, becomes so knowledgeable about the French penal code that he acts as an unofficial judge for the criminals of Paris, mediating their disputes. He falls in love with Agnès who is engaged to Doctor Ventoux, who leads a double life as a notorious criminal known as The Cat. He helps the Doctor to plan a major heist in the hope that he will free Agnès to marry him.

== Cast ==
- Paul Meurisse as Léopold
- Geneviève Page as Agnès des Vallières
- Paul Hubschmid as Doctor Ventoux / Le 'chat'
- Micheline Luccioni as Arlette
- Lutz Gabor as Fernand
- Jacques Seiler as Albert
- Henri Lambert as La Quille
- Noël Roquevert as De Royssac
- Fernand Berset as The giant
- Paul Préboist as The butler of Ventoux
- André Weber as Pellegrini
- Florence Blot as L'infirmière
- Marcel Charvey as Le maître d'hôtel
- Louis Bugette as Un truand
- Béatrice Delange as La bonne d'Agnès
- Robert Favart as Maître Boissard

== Bibliography ==
- Gili, Jean A. & Tassone, Aldo. Parigi-Roma: 50 anni di coproduzioni italo-francesi (1945-1995). Editrice Il castoro, 1995.
- Rège, Philippe. Encyclopedia of French Film Directors, Volume 1. Scarecrow Press, 2009.
