= Micheline Luccioni =

French actress

- Born: 16 January 1930; Palaiseau, France
- Died: 24 December 1992 (aged 62); Paris, France
- Occupation: Actress
- Years active: 1956-1987 (film)

Micheline Luccioni (1930–1992) was a French stage, film and television actress. Her son, José Luccioni, was also an actor.

== Partial filmography ==
- Gervaise (1956) - Clémence - une blanchisseuse, ouvrière chez Gervaise
- Baratin (1956) - Brigitte
- Lovers of Paris (1957) - Valérie Vabre
- Back to the Wall (1958) - La postière
- Maxime (1958) - Liliane d'Aix
- Guinguette (1959) - Une amie de Guinguette
- Witness in the City (1959) - Germaine - une radio taxi
- Croquemitoufle (1959) - Nénette
- Maigret and the Saint-Fiacre Case (1959) - Arlette - une prostituée
- Way of Youth (1959) - Solange, la secrétaire de Charles Michaud
- Tête folle (1960) - Suzanne
- La brune que voilà (1960) - Paulette - la secrétaire
- It Happened All Night (1960) - La fille du bois de Boulogne
- Les livreurs (1961) - Madame Bellanger
- Le puits aux trois vérités (1961) - La radio-reporter
- Le Tracassin (1961) - Jeannette - la serveuse du restaurant
- The Majordomo (1965) - Arlette
- How to Keep the Red Lamp Burning (1965) - Carmen, une pensionnaire (segment "Fermeture, La") (uncredited)
- La sentinelle endormie (1966) - Clémence
- An Idiot in Paris (1967) - Lucienne - une prostituée
- Fleur d'oseille (1967) - Une salope
- A Little Virtuous (1968) - Doris
- Le tatoué (1968) - L'aubergiste
- Elle boit pas, elle fume pas, elle drague pas, mais... elle cause ! (1970) - Lucette
- Children of Mata Hari (1970) - L'employée des postes
- L'homme orchestre (1970) - La femme ivre sur le yacht (uncredited)
- Le Distrait (1970) - Madame Gastier
- Jo (1971) - Françoise
- Le drapeau noir flotte sur la marmite (1971) - Paulette Simonet
- Églantine (1972) - Yolande - une fille d'Eglantine
- Les grands sentiments font les bons gueuletons (1973) - Christiane Armand
- Vogue la galère (1973, TV Movie) - Marion
- On n'est pas sérieux quand on a 17 ans (1974) - La mère de Bess
- Vous ne l'emporterez pas au paradis (1975) - Gina
- Dis bonjour à la dame!.. (1977) - Madame Ferry
- Je vous ferai aimer la vie (1979) - Madame Kolb
- Cherchez l'erreur (1980) - Solange
- Prends ta rolls et va pointer (1981) - Germaine Vignault
- Vive la sociale! (1983) - Madame Armand

== Bibliography ==
- Peter Cowie & Derek Elley. World Filmography: 1967. Fairleigh Dickinson University Press, 1977.
