= Voyage Without Hope =

1943 film

- Directed by: Christian-Jaque
- Written by: Christian-Jaque; Marc-Gilbert Sauvajon; Pierre Mac Orlan; Georg C. Klaren
- Produced by: Roger Richebé
- Starring: Simone Renant; Jean Marais; Paul Bernard
- Cinematography: Robert Lefebvre
- Edited by: Jacques Desagneaux
- Music by: Maurice-Paul Guillot; Jean Marion
- Production company: Films Roger Richebé
- Distributed by: Films Roger Richebé
- Release date: 15 December 1943
- Running time: 89 minutes
- Country: France
- Language: French

Voyage Without Hope (French: Voyage sans espoir) is a 1943 French crime drama film directed by Christian-Jaque and starring Simone Renant, Jean Marais and Paul Bernard. It is a remake of the 1931 film The Lovers of Midnight. It was shot at the Saint-Maurice Studios in Paris. The film's sets were designed by the art director Robert Gys. It has been classified as a film noir with an opening that recalls the pre-war poetic realist film The Human Beast.

== Synopsis ==
A bank clerk steals money and plans to run off to Argentina on a freighter. On the train to the port he encounters a criminal just released from prison who takes him for a naïve, wealthy young man and persuades his old girlfriend, nightclub singer Marie-Ange, to seduce him. However, she falls in love with the essentially honest boy and as the net closes in against him from both the criminals and the law she ultimately sacrifices herself for him.

== Cast ==
- Simone Renant as Marie-Ange
- Jean Marais as Alain Ginestier
- Paul Bernard as Pierre Gohelle
- Jean Brochard as Inspector Chapelin
- Louis Salou as Inspector Sorbier
- Ky Duyen as Li-Fang
- Lucien Coëdel as Philippe Dejanin
- Marcel Maupi as Le barman
- Clary Monthal as Laura - l'habilleuse

== Bibliography ==
- Walker-Morrison, Deborah. Classic French Noir: Gender and the Cinema of Fatal Desire. Bloomsbury Publishing, 2020.
