= Jean Ferry =

French screenwriter (1906–1974)

- Born: Jean André Medous; 16 June 1906; Capens, Haute-Garonne, France
- Died: 5 September 1974 (aged 68); Créteil, France
- Occupation: Writer • Screenwriter

Jean Levy, known as Jean Ferry (16 June 1906 – 5 September 1974), was a French writer and screenwriter and follower of the 'pataphysical tradition'. He died in Val-de-Marne, France, in 1974. French publisher Raphaël Sorin described him as "a little man, round all over. A sharp eye behind round glasses, close-shaven head, high-pitched voice, and a potbelly that recalled Ubu's gidouille."

In addition to his literary career, he was known as an Oulipo guest of honour, satrap of the College of Pataphysics, and specialist in the cult figure and French poet, novelist and playwright Raymond Roussel (also known as the eccentric neighbour of Proust).

== Selected filmography ==
- Musicians of the Sky (1940) - directed by Georges Lacombe
- Children of Paradise (1944) - treatment written in hiding of the Marcel Carné / Jacques Prévert film
- The Eleventh Hour Guest (1945)
- Dawn Devils (1946)
- Quai des Orfèvres (1947) - directed by Henri-Georges Clouzot
- Eternal Conflict (1948)
- Manon (1949) - directed by Henri-Georges Clouzot
- Miquette et sa mère (1949) - directed by Henri-Georges Clouzot
- Tuesday's Guest (1950) - directed by Jacques Deval
- The Most Beautiful Girl in the World (1951) directed by Christian Stengel
- The Beautiful Image (1951) - directed by Claude Heymann
- Spartacus (1951) - directed by Riccardo Freda
- Nana (1955) - directed by Christian-Jaque
- Cela s'appelle l'aurore (1955) - directed by Luis Buñuel
- Nathalie (1957) - directed by Christian-Jacque
- Tabarin (1958) - directed by Richard Pottier
- Babette s'en va-t-en guerre (1959) - directed by Christian-Jaque
- The Fenouillard Family (1960) - directed by Yves Robert
- Madame Sans-Gêne (1961) - directed by Christian-Jaque
- Vie privée (1962) - directed by Louis Malle
- The Man from Cocody (1965) - directed by Christian-Jaque
- The Saint Lies in Wait (1966) - directed by Christian-Jaque
- La Faute de l'abbé Mouret (1970) - directed by Georges Franju
- Daughters of Darkness (1971) - directed by Harry Kümel
- Malpertuis (1972) - directed by Harry Kümel
- De Komst van Joachim Stiller - The Coming of Joachim Stiller (1974) - directed by Harry Kümel

== See also ==
- La Loi des rues (1956)
- Le Saint prend l'affût (1966)
