= Francoeur Studios =

Film studios in Paris, France

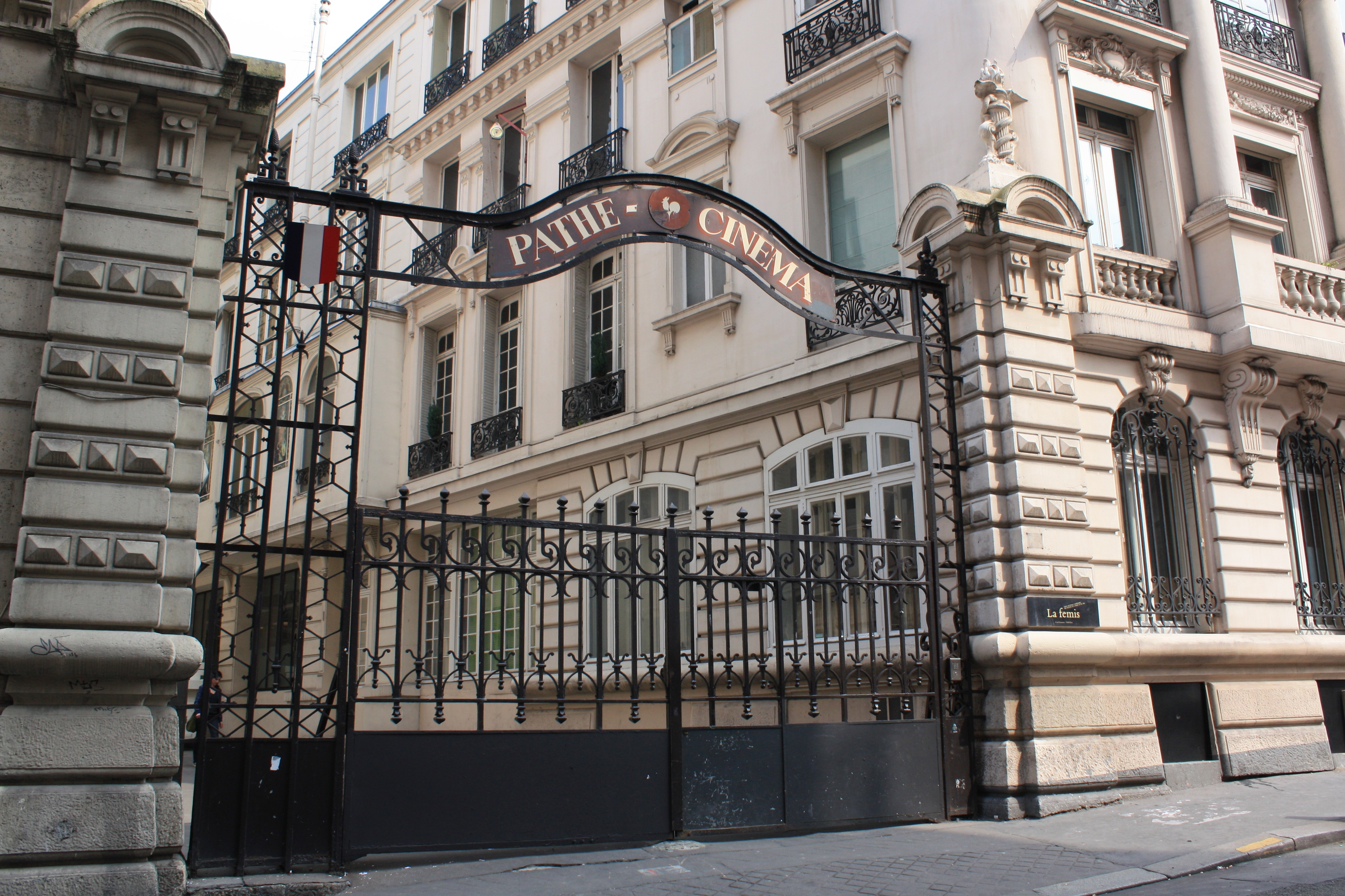
Entrance to the studios

The Francoeur Studios are film production studios in Paris. In 1926 Bernard Natan's Rapid Films set up production at the location, before in 1929 it was merged with the Pathé conglomerate under Natan's overall control. In the postwar era it was part of the Franstudio complex along with the Joinville and Saint-Maurice Studios. In the 1970s it was used for shooting television. Since 1999 it has been the headquarters of La Fémis.

== Bibliography ==
- Crisp, C.G. The Classic French Cinema, 1930–1960. Indiana University Press, 1993.
- Hewitt, Nicholas. Montmartre: A Cultural History. Oxford University Press, 2017.
- Steinhart, Daniel. Runaway Hollywood: Internationalizing Postwar Production and Location Shooting. University of California Press, 2019.
- Turk, Edward Baron . Child of Paradise: Marcel Carné and the Golden Age of French Cinema. Harvard University Press, 1989.
