= José Luccioni (actor) =

French actor and artistic director (1949–2022)

- Born: 1 August 1949; France
- Died: 2 June 2022 (aged 72); France
- Occupations: Actor; Artistic director

Jose Luccioni (1 August 1949 – 2 June 2022) was a French actor and artistic director. Primarily active in dubbing, he was notably the French voice of Al Pacino from 1985 to 2021. He also directed dubbing in numerous films, television series, and telefilms.

== Biography ==
=== Family ===
José was the son of baritone Jacques Luccioni, who himself was the son of tenor José Luccioni (1903–1978). His mother was actress Micheline Luccioni. His daughter, Olivia, is also an actress and artistic director.

=== Dubbing ===
In 1976, Luccioni became a voice actor on Au théâtre ce soir with Dominique Paturel. Here, he would commence his career in dubbing and voice acting. He dubbed characters of John Travolta in Carrie (1976) and Richard Gere in Looking for Mr. Goodbar (1977). He also dubbed in the series Candy Candy (1978), Once Upon a Time... Space (1982), and The Mysterious Cities of Gold (1982).

In the 1980s, he dubbed numerous horror films, such as Cannibal Holocaust (1980), The Funhouse (1981), Friday the 13th Part 2 (1981), The Howling (1981), Creepshow (1982), and A Nightmare on Elm Street (1984).

In 1995, he became the regular French voice of Al Pacino, under the direction of Bernard Murat and Sylvain Joubert. Others he regularly dubbed included Joe Mantegna, Harvey Keitel, and Edward James Olmos. In addition, he lent his voice to several video game series, such as Gears of War (2006–2019), Uncharted (2007–2016), Watch Dogs (2014–2020), and Overwatch (2016).

Jose Luccioni died on 2 June 2022 at the age of 72.

== Filmography ==
=== Cinema ===
- Un meurtre est un meurtre (1972)
- Les Volets clos (1973)
- Like a Pot of Strawberries (1974)
- Catherine & Co. (1975)
- Il y a longtemps que je t'aime (1979)
- Le Mouton noir (1979)
- N'oublie pas ton père au vestiaire (1982)
- Danton (1983)

=== Television ===
- Au théâtre ce soir (1976)
- Les Amours des années grises (1981)
- Le Mystère des sources du Nil (2003; voice-over)

=== Music ===
- JVLIVS (2018)
- JVLIVS II (2021)
