= Henri Jeanson =

French writer and journalist (1900–1970)

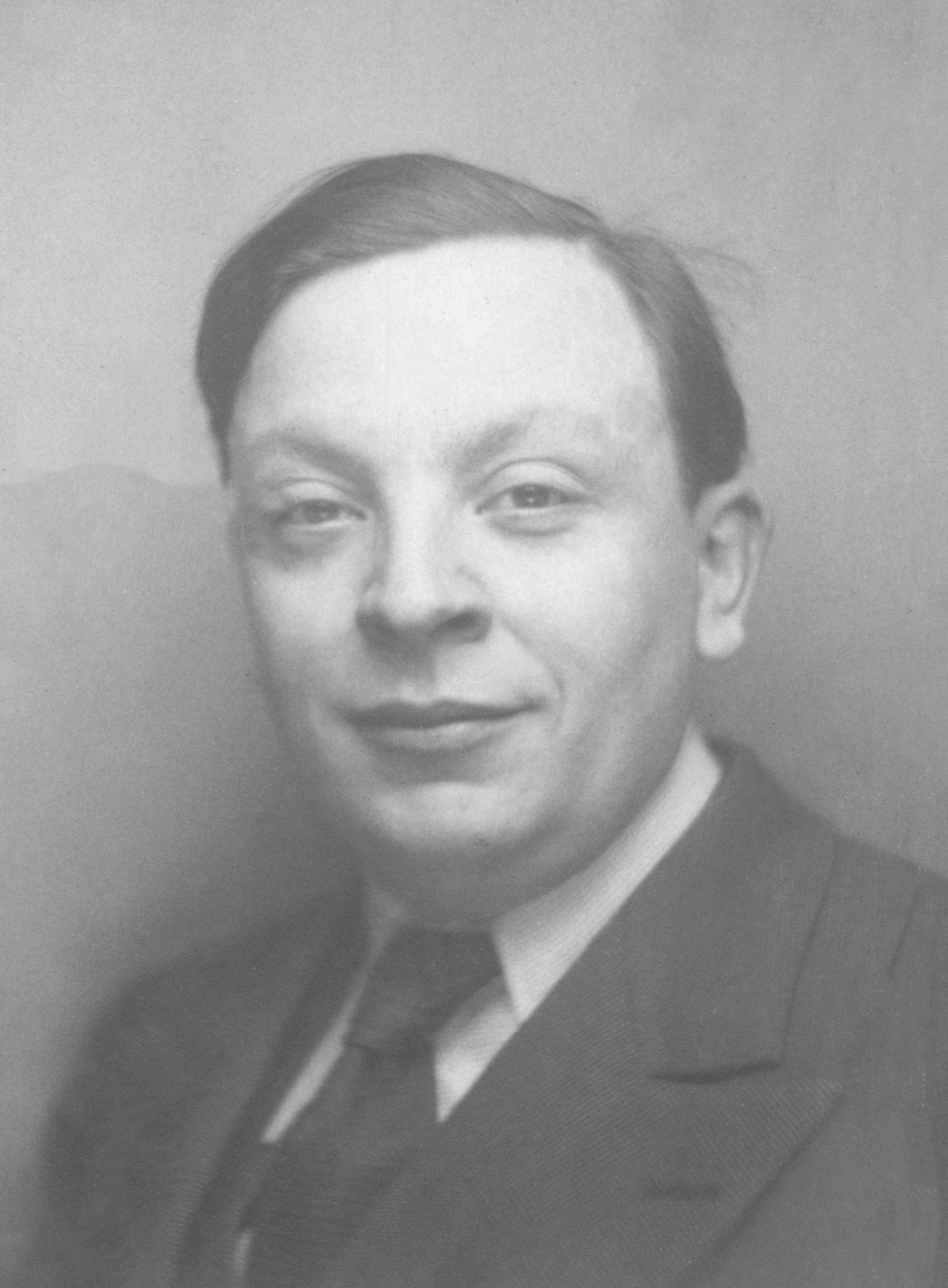
- Born: Henri Jules Louis Jeanson; 6 March 1900; Paris, France
- Died: 6 November 1970 (aged 70); Équemauville, France
- Occupations: Journalist, writer

Henri Jules Louis Jeanson (6 March 1900 – 6 November 1970) was a French writer and journalist. He was a "satrap" in the "College of 'Pataphysics".

== As a journalist before World War II ==
Jeanson was born on 6 March 1900 in Paris. His father was a teacher. Before becoming a journalist, he had several casual jobs, including being depicted as a soldier on a good-luck card for a postcard seller, belying his future pacifism. In 1917, he started work for La Bataille, newspaper of the Confédération générale du travail. Noted for his strong writing, he was a journalist throughout the 1920s, with intervening stints as reporter, interviewer and film critic. He was distinguished by the potency of his style and a taste for polemic. Jeanson worked for several papers including the Journal du peuple, Hommes du Jour and the Canard enchaîné, where he defended complete pacifism.

He resigned from the Canard enchaîné in 1937, in solidarity with Jean Galtier-Boissière.

He was sentenced to 18 months in prison in July 1939, for publishing an article in Solidarité internationale antifasciste, a periodical founded in November 1938 by Louis Lecoin, in which he congratulated Herschel Grynszpan for his assassination of Ernst vom Rath, an official of the German embassy in Paris. He was arrested in November 1939, at which time he had already joined his regiment in Meaux, for articles which had appeared in March and August 1939, and for having signed Louis Lecoin's tract "Paix immédiate". On 20 December 1939, he was sentenced by a military tribunal to five years in prison for "calling for disobedience within the ranks".

== During World War II ==
Jeanson was in prison for his pacifist writings, and this only a few days before the German army marched into Paris. His freedom was obtained by the lawyer and minister César Campinchi. He remained in Paris and in August 1940 was given the chief editorship of Aujourd'hui, an "independent" newspaper. The first issue went out on 10 September 1940. In November 1940, the German authorities pressured him to take a public position against the Jews and in favour of the politics of collaboration with the Vichy regime. Jeanson resigned and went back to prison. He was freed a few months later after the intervention of his friend Gaston Bergery, a neo-radical who had turned to the collaborationists through ultra-pacifism. From that point on he was banned from the press and the cinema, and worked secretly, writing film dialogues without putting his name to them. With Pierre Bénard, Jeanson participated in the development of secret pamphlets, and just missed being re-arrested in 1942. He continued to lie low until the liberation of France.

His story is said to illustrate the contradictions and compromises of absolute pacifism: the willingness to seek an understanding with Germany to avoid war, transforming, after France's defeat, into a desire for proper coexistence, even offering to serve the Germans. The newspaper Aujourd'hui was far from being innocent in its hunting down those allegedly responsible for France's defeat, resorting to the "clean sweep of the broom" myth in its Anglophobia. The paper entered into resonance with Marshal Philippe Pétain's narrative, and took the direction of German propaganda.

== As a journalist after the war ==
Despite Jeanson's wartime work for Aujourd'hui, he regained the editorship of le Canard enchaîné after France's liberation. He resumed his journalistic calling, working for Le Crapouillot, le Canard enchaîné, Combat and L'Aurore. He left the editorship of le Canard enchaîné in April 1947, following an article which was cut, on the subject of "Aragon, Elsa Triolet, Maurice Thorez and the communists". This departure was the occasion of upheaval and settling of accounts among the press. He ultimately returned to le Canard, where he published articles under the pseudonym "Huguette ex-Micro" until 1970. He participated in "Cinémonde" . From 1967 to 1970, he was a television critic for L'Aurore.

While Jeanson was feared in the art and political worlds for his deadly prose, he was also at the forefront of leading great political struggles, over pacifism, anticolonialism, defending freedom of expression, always remaining a free spirit.

Jeanson abandoned cinema in 1965 to devote himself to polemical journalism and the editing of his memoirs, which were published under the title 70 Ans d'adolescence several months after his death. He died in Équemauville, near Honfleur (Calvados) on 6 November 1970.

== Filmography ==
=== Scenario and dialogues ===
- Le Jugement de minuit (1932)
- La Dame de chez Maxim's (1932)
- Mariage à responsabilité limité (1933)
- Bach the Millionaire (1933)
- The Merry Monarch (1933)
- Die Abenteuer des Königs Pausole (1933)
- Les Aventures du roi Pausole(1933)
- Sidonie Panache (1934)
- Merchant of Love (1935)
- Les Amants traqués (1936)
- Pépé le Moko (1937)
- White Cargo (1937)
- Life Dances On (1937)
- The Kiss of Fire (1937)
- The Kings of Sport (1937)
- The Lie of Nina Petrovna (1937)
- The Patriot (1938)
- Prison sans barreaux (1938)
- Entrée des artistes (1938)
- Princess Tarakanova (1938)
- Le Drame de Shanghaï (1938)
- Carmen (1942)
- Florence Is Crazy (1944)
- The Last Judgment (1945)
- Farandole (1945)
- A Lover's Return (1946)
- The Damned (1947)
- Four Knaves (1947)
- The Crowned Fish Tavern (1947)
- To the Eyes of Memory (1948)
- The Loves of Colette (1948)
- Between Eleven and Midnight (1949)
- The Sinners (1949)
- Lady Paname (1950) (également réalisateur)
- Murders (1950)
- Pour l'amour du ciel (1950)
- Paris Vice Squad (1951)
- Savage Triangle (1951)
- Fanfan la Tulipe (1952)
- La Minute de vérité (1952)
- The Man in My Life (1952)
- Madame du Barry (1954)
- Spring, Autumn and Love (1955)
- Nathalie (1957)
- Maxime (1958)
- Marie-Octobre (1959)
- Nathalie, Secret Agent (1959)
- Guinguette (1959)
- It Can't Always Be Caviar (1961)
- This Time It Must Be Caviar (1961)
- Le Crime ne paie pas (1961) – sketch L'Affaire Hugues
- Le Diable et les Dix Commandements (1962) – sketches Père et mère tu honoreras, Tu ne mentiras point, Tu ne jureras point
- Champagne for Savages (1964)
- The Black Tulip (1964)
- The Majordomo (1965)
- Pas de caviar pour tante Olga (1965)
- Paris in August (1966)
- The Saint Lies in Wait (1966)
- L'Homme à la Buick (1967)

== Writer ==
Jeanson also wrote for the theatre, without much success despite it being his favourite artistic medium. He was member of the Académie de l'Humour and of the Académie Rabelais. His theatrical works include Amis comme avant, Aveux spontanés, Le Petit Navire, Toi que j'ai tant aimée and L'Heure éblouissante.

== Quotes ==
- Pour nous, un poète est un monsieur qui s'efforce de saisir l'eau par poignées. C'est seulement quand il y parvient que le monsieur est un poète.
- Par terre on se dispute, mais au lit on s'explique. Et sur l'oreiller, on se comprend ! (Arletty in Hôtel du Nord)
- Vous avez déjà lu le Larousse ? C'est un recueil de noms célèbres complètement inconnus.
- Qui nierait que le cinéma sonore nous a fait découvrir le silence ? Le silence est la plus belle conquête du parlant.
- Je ne suis pas sceptique. Je ne crois à rien, mais j'y crois fermement...
- Les jeunes filles tiennent à l'estime de ceux qu'elles aiment. Après...
- De Gaulle a fait le don de la France à sa personne. (referring to Pétain's phrase Je fais don de ma personne à la France)
- Le capitalisme, c'est l'exploitation de l'homme par l'homme ; et le marxisme, C'est le contraire. (attributed to Jeanson but probably not invented by him)
- "J'ai besoin de changer d'atmosphère… et mon atmosphère : c'est toi ! – C'est la première fois qu'on me traite d'atmosphère ! Si j'suis une atmosphère, t'es un drôle de bled ! Oh là là… les types qui sont du milieu sans en être et qui cognent à cause de ce qu'ils ont été, on devrait les vider. Atmosphère… atmosphère ! Est-ce que j'ai une gueule d'atmosphère ? Puisque c'est ça vas-y tout seul à La Varenne… Bonne pêche et bonne atmosphère !". Dialogue between Louis Jouvet and Arletty in Hôtel du Nord.
- "Le suffrage universel est la voix de l’inconscience publique. C’est aussi l’un des plus ingénieux abus de confiance que l’homme ait inventés pour se moquer du monde. Comme le coup du rendez-vous, le coup du suffrage universel réussit toujours, avec cette différence qu’il fait quarante millions de dupes à la fois au lieu d’une."
- About the 1957 film Les Espions : "Henri-Georges Clouzot a fait Kafka dans sa culotte"

== Bibliography ==
- Entrée des Artistes. La Nouvelle édition – "Les classiques du cinéma français". (1946)
- 70 Ans d'adolescence. (Stock, 1971)
- En verve. Mots, propos, aphorismes. (Horay, 1971)
- Henri Jeanson, by Christophe Moussé. Presses universitaires de Nancy. 1993. Collection "Films, textes, références".
- Jeanson par Jeanson – La Mémoire du cinéma, presented by René Château (2000).
