= Christian-Jaque =

French filmmaker (1904–1994)

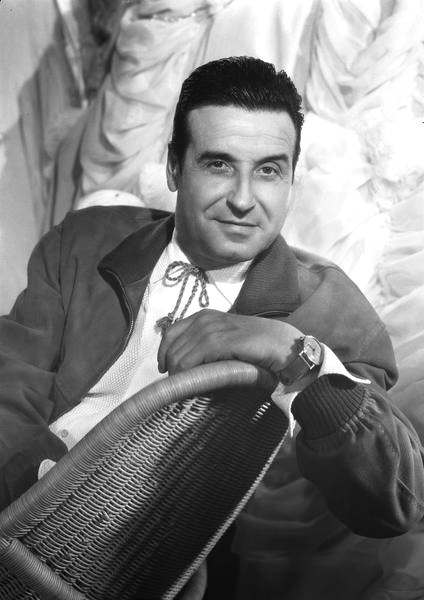
- Christian-Jaque in 1954
- Born: Christian Maudet; 4 September 1904; Paris, France
- Died: 8 July 1994 (aged 89); Boulogne-Billancourt, France
- Occupation: Filmmaker
- Years active: 1938–1977
- Spouses: Denise Morlot; Laurence Christol; Simone Renant (m. 1940; div. 1944); Renée Faure (m. 1947; div. 1953); Martine Carol (m. 1954; div. 1959); Christiane Delyne

Christian-Jaque (byname of Christian Maudet; 4 September 1904 – 8 July 1994) was a French filmmaker. From 1954 to 1959, he was married to actress Martine Carol, who starred in several of his films, including Lucrèce Borgia (1953), Madame du Barry (1954), and Nana (1955). In 1961 he married Laurence Christol

Christian-Jaque's 1946 film A Lover's Return was entered into the 1946 Cannes Film Festival. He won the Best Director award at the 1952 Cannes Film Festival for his popular swashbuckler Fanfan la Tulipe. At the 2nd Berlin International Film Festival, he won the Silver Bear award for the same film. In 1959, he was a member of the jury at the 1st Moscow International Film Festival.

Christian-Jaque began his motion picture career in the 1920s as an art director and production designer. By the early 1930s, he had moved into screenwriting and directing. He continued working into the mid-1980s, though from 1970 on, most of his work was done for television. In 1979, he was a member of the jury at the 11th Moscow International Film Festival.

Christian-Jaque was born in Paris. He died at Boulogne-Billancourt in 1994.

== Selected filmography ==
=== Director ===
- The Pont-Biquet Family (1935)
- Monsieur Personne (1936)
- School for Journalists (1936)
- Josette (1937)
- Francis the First (1937)
- In Venice, One Night (1937)
- The House Opposite (1937)
- Boys' School (1938)
- Rail Pirates (1938)
- Ernest the Rebel (1938)
- First Ball (1941)
- Who Killed Santa Claus? (1941)
- La Symphonie fantastique (1942)
- Carmen (1942)
- Voyage Without Hope (1943)
- Boule de suif (1945)
- The Bellman (1945)
- A Lover's Return (1946)
- The Charterhouse of Parma (1948)
- Man to Men (1948)
- Singoalla (1949)
- Lost Souvenirs (1950)
- Barbe-Bleue (1951) and German-language version Bluebeard (1951)
- Adorable Creatures (1952)
- Fanfan la Tulipe (1952)
- Lucrèce Borgia (1953)
- Destinées (1954)
- Madame du Barry (1954)
- Nana (1955)
- If All the Guys in the World (1956)
- Nathalie (1957)
- The Law Is the Law (1958)
- Babette Goes to War (1959)
- Love and the Frenchwoman (segment "Le Divorce") (1960)
- Madame (1961)
- Don't Tempt the Devil (1963)
- The Black Tulip (1964)
- Champagne for Savages (1964)
- The Man from Cocody (1965)
- The Dirty Game (1965)
- The Second Twin (1966)
- The Saint Lies in Wait (1966)
- Dead Run (1967)
- Emma Hamilton (1968)
- The Legend of Frenchie King (1971)
- Docteur Justice (1975)
- Parisian Life (1977)

=== Art director ===
- The Great Passion (1928)
- The Best Mistress (1929)
- The Wedding March (1929)
- Levy and Company (1930)
- Tenderness (1930)
- The Sandman (1932)
- The Levy Department Stores (1932)

=== Actor ===
- Southern Cross (1932)
