= Georges Van Parys =

French composer (1902–1971)

Georges Van Parys (7 June 1902 in Paris – 28 January 1971 in Paris) was a French composer of film music and operettas. Among his musical influences were the group Les Six, Maurice Ravel, and Claude Debussy. Later in his career he served as vice-president of the Société des auteurs, compositeurs et éditeurs de musique. He is buried in the cemetery at Villiers-sur-Marne.

== Operettas ==
- 1922: Madame la Comtesse
- 1923: Une bonne à rien faire
- 1927: Voila le printemps
- 1936: Prends la route
- 1941: Petites Annonces
- 1941: L'École buissonnière
- 1943: Une femme par jour
- 1946: Virginie Déjazet
- 1946: Les Chasseurs d'images
- 1949: La Tour Eiffel qui tue
- 1950: Tristoeil et Brunehouille
- 1951: L'Affaire Fualdès (about murder of A.B. Fualdès & subsequent trial)
- 1951: La Reine-Mère
- 1953: Que d'eau, que d'eau
- 1956: Minnie-Moustache
- 1960: Le Jeu des dames
- 1961: La Belle de Paris

With Philippe Parès :

- 1927: Quand y en a pour deux
- 1927: Lulu, libretto Serge Véber, Théâtre Daunou
- 1927: La Petite Dame du Train bleu
- 1928: L'Eau à la bouche
- 1929: Louis XIV
- 1930: Le cœur y est
- 1931: Couss-Couss
- 1937: Ma petite amie
- 1945: On cherche un roi
- 1957: Le Moulin Sans-Souci

== Partial filmography ==
- The Woman and the Puppet (1929)
- Black and White (1931)
- I'll Be Alone After Midnight (1931)
- The Lovers of Midnight (1931)
- Sailor's Song (1932)
- Rouletabille the Aviator (1932)
- A Son from America (1932)
- The Old Devil (1933)
- The Crime of Bouif (1933)
- Mademoiselle Josette, My Woman (1933)
- Zouzou (1934)
- Coralie and Company (1934)
- The Ideal Woman (1934)
- Gold in the Street (1934)
- Youth (1934)
- The House on the Dune (1934)
- Beautiful Days (1935)
- Counsel for Romance (1936)
- The Happy Road (1936)
- Gargousse (1938)
- My Priest Among the Rich (1938)
- The Train for Venice (1938)
- Mother Love (1938)
- The Path of Honour (1939)
- Extenuating Circumstances (1939)
- Miquette (1940)
- The Mondesir Heir (1940)
- First Ball (1941)
- Moulin Rouge (1941)
- Romance of Paris (1941)
- The Suitors Club (1941)
- The Acrobat (1941)
- Prince Charming (1942)
- Frederica (1942)
- Bolero (1942)
- At Your Command, Madame (1942)
- My Priest Among the Rich (1932)
- The Benefactor (1942)
- Sideral Cruises (1942)
- Mademoiselle Béatrice (1943)
- Marie-Martine (1943)
- The Midnight Sun (1943)
- Behold Beatrice (1944)
- The Eleventh Hour Guest (1945)
- Not So Stupid (1946)
- Third at Heart (1947)
- Sybille's Night (1947)
- Something to Sing About (1947)
- Four Knaves (1947)
- Last Chance Castle (1947)
- The Cupboard Was Bare (1948)
- The Loves of Colette (1948)
- White as Snow (1948)
- The Heart on the Sleeve (1948)
- Scandal (1948)
- A Change in the Wind (1949)
- The Voice of Dreams (1949)
- A Certain Mister (1950)
- Tuesday's Guest (1950)
- Old Boys of Saint-Loup (1950)
- Lady Paname (1950)
- Voyage for Three (1950)
- Mademoiselle Josette, My Woman (1950)
- Rome Express (1950)
- Two Pennies Worth of Violets (1951)
- This Age Without Pity (1952)
- Love, Madame (1952)
- Twelve Hours of Happiness (1952)
- They Were Five (1952)
- Wonderful Mentality (1953)
- Virgile (1953)
- A Caprice of Darling Caroline (1953)
- Le Secret d'Hélène Marimon (1954)
- The Beautiful Otero (1954)
- Madame du Barry (1954)
- Service Entrance (1954)
- Les Intrigantes (1954)
- Mam'zelle Nitouche (1954)
- Scènes de ménage (1954)
- Les Impures (1954)
- Les Diaboliques (1955)
- Papa, maman, ma femme et moi (1955)
- Sophie and the Crime (1955)
- Maid in Paris (1956)
- Comme un cheveu sur la soupe (1956)
- It Happened in Aden (1956)
- Meeting in Paris (1956)
- Women's Club (1956)
- Charming Boys (1957)
- Nathalie (1957)
- Until the Last One (1957)
- La Tour, prends garde ! (1958)
- Marie of the Isles (1959)
- Nathalie, Secret Agent (1959)
- Nina (1959)
- Guinguette (1959)
- Le Tracassin (1961)
- Captain Fracasse (1961)
- Girl on the Road (1962)
- Mandrin (1962)
- Arsène Lupin Versus Arsène Lupin (1962)
- The Bamboo Stroke (1963)
- Monsieur (1964)
- Coplan Takes Risks (1964)
- The Lace Wars (1965)
- Leontine (1968)
