= Christian Matras (cinematographer) =

French cinematographer (1903–1977)

Christian Matras (29 December 1903, Valence, Drôme, France – 4 May 1977, Paris) was a French cinematographer who worked on more than hundred feature films, including Grand Illusion (1937), directed by Jean Renoir; The Milky Way (1969), directed by Luis Buñuel; and Thérèse Desqueyroux (1962), directed by Georges Franju; Lola Montès (1955), The Earrings of Madame De... (1953), Le Plaisir (1952), La Ronde (1950), all directed by Max Ophüls; and L'Aigle à deux têtes (1948) directed by Jean Cocteau.

== Selected filmography ==
- Misdeal (1928)
- Billeting Order (1932)
- The Scandal (1934)
- The House on the Dune (1934)
- The Coquelet Affair (1935)
- Motherhood (1935)
- The Mutiny of the Elsinore (1936)
- The Forsaken (1937)
- La Grande Illusion (1938)
- The Marvelous Night (1940)
- Paradise Lost (1940)
- Romance of Paris (1941)
- The Chain Breaker (1941)
- The Law of Spring (1942)
- Colonel Pontcarral (1942)
- Lucrèce (1943)
- Secrets (1943)
- The Stairs Without End (1943)
- Traveling Light (1944)
- Mademoiselle X (1945)
- The Idiot (1946)
- Once is Enough (1946)
- Eternal Conflict (1948)
- All Roads Lead to Rome (1949)
- The Paris Waltz (1950)
- La Rhonde (1950)
- Bluebeard (1951)
- Le Plaisir (1951)
- Imperial Violets (1952)
- The Earrings of Madame de... (1953)
- Madame du Barry (1954)
- Lola Montès (1955)
- Meeting in Paris (1956)
- A Kiss for a Killer (1957)
- An Eye for an Eye (1957)
- Virginie (1962)
- The Bamboo Stroke (1963)
- The Lace Wars (1965)
- The Majordomo (1965)
- The Desperate Ones (1967)
- La Voie Lactee (1969)
- Variety (1971)
- Not Dumb, The Bird (1972)
