= Rosine Delamare =

French costume designer (1911–2013)

- Born: Denise Rosemonde Delamare; 11 June 1911; Colombes, France
- Died: 17 March 2013 (aged 101); Paris, France
- Other names: Roseline Delamare
- Occupation: Costume designer
- Years active: 1938–1984
- Relatives: Lise Delamare (sister)

Denise Rosemonde "Rosine" Delamare (11 June 1911 – 17 March 2013) was a French costume designer. She was nominated for an Academy Award and a César Award.

== Filmography ==
=== Cinema ===
- 1942 : The Blue Veil by Jean Stelli
- 1942 : La Symphonie fantastique by Christian-Jaque
- 1943 : The Heart of a Nation by Julien Duvivier
- 1943 : Pierre et Jean by André Cayatte
- 1943 : The Count of Monte Cristo by Robert Vernay
- 1943 : Shop Girls of Paris by André Cayatte
- 1945 : Boule de suif by Christian-Jaque
- 1946 : Strange Fate by Louis Cuny
- 1946 : The Revenge of Roger by André Cayatte
- 1947 : Monsieur Vincent by Maurice Cloche
- 1947 : Le Destin exécrable de Guillemette Babin by Guillaume Radot
- 1947 : Captain Blomet by Andrée Feix
- 1949 : Le Roi by Marc-Gilbert Sauvajon
- 1949 : Doctor Laennec by Maurice Cloche
- 1949 : Les amants de Vérone by André Cayatte
- 1950 : My Friend Sainfoin by Marc-Gilbert Sauvajon
- 1950 : Cartouche, King of Paris by Guillaume Radot
- 1950 : Fusillé à l'aube by André Haguet
- 1950 : Ma pomme by Marc-Gilbert Sauvajon
- 1951 : Monsieur Fabre by Henri Diamant-Berger
- 1951 : Captain Ardant by André Zwoboda
- 1951 : Dr. Knock by Guy Lefranc
- 1951 : La Maison Bonnadieu by Carlo Rim
- 1952 : An Artist with Ladies by Jean Boyer
- 1952 : Adorable Creatures by Christian-Jaque
- 1952 : The Green Glove by Rudolph Maté
- 1952 : Plaisirs de Paris by Ralph Baum
- 1952 : Beauties of the Night by René Clair
- 1952 : Il est minuit, Docteur Schweitzer by André Haguet
- 1952 : Judgement of God by Raymond Bernard
- 1953 : The Earrings of Madame de… by Max Ophüls
- 1953 : Tourbillon by Alfred Rode
- 1953 : The Porter from Maxim's by Henri Diamant-Berger
- 1953 : Dortoir des grandes by Henri Decoin
- 1953 : La Dame aux camélias by Raymond Bernard
- 1953 : The Slave by Yves Ciampi
- 1953 : The Most Wanted Man by Henri Verneuil
- 1954 : The Bed, film à sketches, segment Le Lit de la Pompadour by Jean Delannoy
- 1954 : Les Révoltés de Lomanach by Richard Pottier
- 1954 : French Cancan by Jean Renoir
- 1954 : Obsession by Jean Delannoy
- 1954 : The Red and the Black by Claude Autant-Lara
- 1954 : Par ordre du tsar by André Haguet
- 1954 : Scènes de ménage by André Berthomieu
- 1954 : Le Chevalier de la nuit by Robert Darène
- 1954 : La Reine Margot by Jean Dréville
- 1954 : On Trial by Julien Duvivier
- 1955 : The Grand Maneuver by René Clair
- 1955 : Les Hussards by Alex Joffé
- 1955 : Caroline and the Rebels by Jean Devaivre
- 1955 : Marguerite de la nuit by Claude Autant-Lara
- 1955 : Black Dossier by André Cayatte
- 1955 : Rififi by Jules Dassin
- 1955 : Milord l'Arsouille by André Haguet
- 1956 : Elena and Her Men de Jean Renoir
- 1956 : Bonsoir Paris, bonjour l'amour by Ralph Baum
- 1956 : Les Aventures de Till L'Espiègle by Gérard Philipe and Joris Ivens
- 1956 : C'est arrivé à Aden by Michel Boisrond
- 1956 : Meeting in Paris by Georges Lampin
- 1957 : Gates of Paris by René Clair
- 1957 : The Man in the Raincoat by Julien Duvivier
- 1958 : The Roots of Heaven by John Huston
- 1958 : Thérèse Étienne by Denys de la Patellière
- 1958 : Maxime by Henri Verneuil
- 1958 : The Gambler by Claude Autant-Lara
- 1958 : La Bonne Tisane by Hervé Bromberger
- 1958 : Christine by Pierre Gaspard-Huit
- 1959 : La Belle et le Tzigane by Jean Dréville and Márton Keleti
- 1959 : Magnificent Sinner by Robert Siodmak
- 1959 : Come Dance with Me by Michel Boisrond
- 1959 : The Green Mare by Claude Autant-Lara
- 1960 : Le secret du Chevalier d'Éon by Jacqueline Audry
- 1961 : The Three Musketeers by Bernard Borderie
- 1961 : Vive Henri IV, vive l'amour by Claude Autant-Lara
- 1961 : The Wonders of Aladdin (Le meraviglie di Aladino) by Mario Bava and Henry Levin
- 1961 : The Count of Monte Cristo by Claude Autant-Lara
- 1962 : Mandrin by Jean-Paul Le Chanois
- 1962 : Le Chevalier de Pardaillan by Bernard Borderie
- 1962 : Cartouche by Philippe de Broca
- 1964 : Angélique, Marquise des Anges by Bernard Borderie
- 1965 : Marvelous Angelique by Bernard Borderie
- 1966 : Angelique and the King by Bernard Borderie
- 1967 : Un idiot à Paris by Serge Korber
- 1967 : The Night of the Generals by Anatole Litvak
- 1967 : Untamable Angelique by Bernard Borderie
- 1967 : La Vingt-cinquième Heure by Henri Verneuil
- 1968 : Emma Hamilton by Christian-Jaque
- 1968 : Angelique and the Sultan by Bernard Borderie
- 1969 : The Madwoman of Chaillot by Bryan Forbes
- 1969 : Catherine, il suffit d'un amour by Bernard Borderie
- 1970 : Rider on the Rain by René Clément
- 1970 : Hello, Goodbye by Jean Negulesco
- 1971 : Time for Loving by Christopher Miles
- 1973 : The Day of the Jackal by Fred Zinnemann
- 1974 : Piaf by Guy Casaril
- 1976 : Une femme fidèle by Roger Vadim
- 1977 : Gloria by Claude Autant-Lara
- 1979 : A Little Romance by George Roy Hill
- 1980 : L'Avare by Jean Girault and Louis de Funès
- 1981 : Chanel Solitaire by George Kaczender
- 1983 : Benvenuta by André Delvaux
- 1984 : Fort Saganne by Alain Corneau

=== Television ===
- 1962 : Le Cid (tragi-comedy by Pierre Corneille), teledrama by Roger Iglésis
- 1962 : La Fille du capitaine, teledrama by Alain Boudet, for the Le Théâtre de la jeunesse series
- 1963 : Tous ceux qui tombent, teledrama by Michel Mitrani
- 1974 : Le deuil sied à Électre (trilogie by Eugene O'Neill), directed by Maurice Cazeneuve
- 1978 : Jean-Christophe, serial by François Villiers
- 1980 : Les Mystères de Paris, serial by André Michel
- 1980 : Gaughin the Savage, telefilm by Fielder Cook
- 1984 : La Dame aux camélias (Camille), telefilm by Desmond Davis

== Theatre ==
(selection)

- 1951 : Le Sabre de mon père by Roger Vitrac, directed by Pierre Dux, with Sophie Desmarets, P. Dux (Théâtre de Paris)
- 1955 : Les Amants novices by Jean Bernard-Luc, directed by Jean Mercure, with Dany Robin, Claude Rich (Théâtre Montparnasse)
- 1976: Doit-on le dire ? by Eugène Labiche, directed by Jean-Laurent Cochet, with Claude Giraud and Jacques Sereys (Comédie-Française)
- 1979 : A Flea in Her Ear by Georges Feydeau, directed by Jean-Laurent Cochet, with Paule Noëlle, Michel Aumont (Comédie-Française)
- 1981 : Chéri, after the eponymous novel by Colette, directed by Jean-Laurent Cochet, with Michèle Morgan, Jean-Pierre Bouvier, Odette Laure (Théâtre des Variétés)

== Awards and nominations ==
Year	Award	Category	Nominated work	Result
1955	27th Academy Awards	Best Costume Design, Black-and-White (shared with Georges Annenkov)	The Earrings of Madame de…	Nominated
1985	10th César Awards	Best Costume Design (shared with Corinne Jorry)	Fort Saganne	Nominated
