= Harold Kay =

Harold Kay may refer to:

- Harold Kay (actor)
- Harold Kay (footballer)

== See also ==
- Harold Kaye, English cricketer
- Harry Kay (disambiguation)
