= Lucienne Legrand =

French actress (1920–2022)

- Born: Lucienne Jeanne Marie Charlot; 18 July 1920; Douai, France
- Died: 19 October 2022 (aged 102); Nogent-le-Rotrou, France
- Occupation: Actress

Lucienne Jeanne Marie Charlot, known by the name Lucienne Vigier and later Lucienne Legrand, (18 July 1920 – 19 October 2022) was a French actress.

== Filmography ==
=== Film ===
- Chèque au porteur (1941)
- Ici l'on pêche (1941)
- Romance of Paris (1941)
- Bolero (1942)
- Miss Bonaparte (1942)
- L'Appel du bled (1942)
- Coup de tête (1944)
- L'aventure est au coin de la rue (1944)
- Children of Paradise (1945)
- Women's Games (1946)
- After Love (1948)
- L'Inconnu d'un soir (1949)
- Tuesday's Guest (1950)
- Rue de l'Estrapade (1953)
- The Three Musketeers (1953)
- At the Order of the Czar (1954)
- The Contessa's Secret (1954)
- The Count of Bragelonne (1954)
- Frou-Frou (1955)
- Lord Rogue (1955)
- Paris Music Hall (1957)
- Speaking of Murder (1957)
- Dear Louise (1972)
- César and Rosalie (1972)
- Elle court, elle court la banlieue (1973)
- Escape to Nowhere (1973)
- Shock Treatment (1973)
- A Slightly Pregnant Man (1973)
- Le Magnifique (1973)
- Forbidden Priests (1973)
- Hail the Artist (1973)
- The Train (1973)
- Stavisky (1974)
- Creezy (1974)
- Verdict (1974)
- Vincent, François, Paul and the Others (1974)
- Émilienne (1975)
- The Pink Telephone (1975)
- Dracula and Son (1976)
- Mado (1976)
- The French Woman (1977)
- The Lacemaker (1977)
- CIA contro KGB (1978)
- La Carapate (1978)
- Practice Makes Perfect (1979)
- A Little Romance (1979)
- La Boum 2 (1982)
- La Passerelle (1988)
- Love in Paris (1997)
- L'Extraterrestre (2000)

=== Television ===
- Cas de divorce (1992)

== Theatre ==
- Ce soir à Samarcande (1950)
- Le Nouveau Testament (1967)
- Madame Sans-Gêne (1973)
