= The Hero of My Dreams =

1960 film

- Directed by: Arthur Maria Rabenalt
- Written by: Gina Falckenberg; Erika Grund; J.A. Hübler-Kahla; Claude-André Puget (play)
- Produced by: Johann Alexander Hübler-Kahla
- Starring: Carlos Thompson; Heidi Brühl; Peter Vogel
- Cinematography: Willi Sohm
- Edited by: Anneliese Schönnenbeck
- Music by: Charly Niessen
- Production company: Bavaria Film
- Distributed by: Bavaria Film
- Release date: 5 August 1960
- Running time: 89 minutes
- Country: West Germany
- Language: German

The Hero of My Dreams (German: Der Held meiner Träume) is a 1960 West German romantic comedy film directed by Arthur Maria Rabenalt and starring Carlos Thompson, Heidi Brühl and Peter Vogel. It was shot at the Bavaria Studios in Munich. The film's sets were designed by the art directors Max Mellin and Karl Weber.

== Cast ==
- Carlos Thompson as Robert Moutier
- Heidi Brühl as Marianne Kleinschmidt
- Peter Vogel as Oliver Martens
- Maria Perschy as Franziska Kleinschmidt
- Margitta Scherr as Petra Martens
- Klaus Dahlen as Bernhard Kleinschmidt
- Marte Harell as Frau Martens
- Edith Mill as Frau Kleinschmidt
- Lucie Englisch as Huberbäuerin
- Hans Zesch-Ballot as Günther Martens
- Hans Elwenspoek as Hugo Kleinschmidt
- Franz Fröhlich as Huberbauer
- Ernst Brasch
- Bum Krüger

== See also ==
- Happy Days (France, 1941)
- Happy Days (Italy, 1942)

== Bibliography ==
- Bock, Hans-Michael & Bergfelder, Tim. The Concise CineGraph. Encyclopedia of German Cinema. Berghahn Books, 2009.
