= Harry Kay =

Harry Kay or Kaye may refer to:

- Harry Kay (psychologist) (1919–2005), British psychologist and academic administrator
- Harry Kay (footballer) (1883–1954), English footballer
- Harry Kaye (1919–1992), English footballer

== See also ==
- Harold Kay (actor) (1926–1990), French actor
- Harold Kay (footballer) (1897–1966), English footballer
- Harold Kaye (1882–1953), English cricketer
- Henry Kaye (disambiguation)
