= The Secret of the Mountain Lake =

1952 film

- Directed by: Jean Dréville
- Written by: Felix Beaujon; A.M. Fasold; Alexander Geßner; Jeanne Humbert; Ernst Zahn (novel)
- Starring: Harriet Geßner; Lil Dagover; Fredy Scheim
- Cinematography: Marc Fossard
- Music by: Bernard Schulé
- Production companies: Aidal Beaujon-Film; Films Monopole; Karpat-Film; Tempo-Film
- Distributed by: Donau-Filmgesellschaft
- Release date: 26 September 1952
- Running time: 86 minutes
- Countries: France; Switzerland; West Germany
- Language: Swiss German

The Secret of the Mountain Lake (German: Das Geheimnis vom Bergsee) is a 1952 drama film directed by Jean Dréville and starring Harriet Geßner, Lil Dagover and Fredy Scheim. It was made as a co-production between France, Switzerland and West Germany. A separate French-language film, The Girl with the Whip, was also released. It was shot at the Billancourt Studios in Paris and on location around Verbier, Saas-Fee and the Forest of Fontainebleau.

== Cast ==
- Harriet Geßner as Angelina
- Lil Dagover as Lamberta Pons
- Fredy Scheim as Bürgermeister
- Marcelle Géniat as Maria Pons, die Großmutter
- Michel Barbey as Calix
- Roger Burckhardt as Ein Schmuggler
- Ann Berger as Lauretta
- Andrews Engelmann as Gefängnisdirektor
- Paul Röthlisberger
- Howard Vernon as Borgo, der Schmugglerwirt
- Karl Wagner

== Bibliography ==
- Hans-Michael Bock and Tim Bergfelder. The Concise Cinegraph: An Encyclopedia of German Cinema. Berghahn Books, 2009.
