= Mexican Slayride (film) =

Mexican Slayrider
- Directed by: Riccardo Freda
- Screenplay by: Bertrand Tavernier
- Based on: Coplan fai peau neuve by Paul Kenny
- Produced by: Robert de Nesle; Edmondo Amati; Alfonso Balcázar
- Starring: Lang Jeffries; Sabine Sun; José María Caffarel; Robert Party
- Cinematography: Paul Soulignac; Juan Gelpí
- Edited by: Claude Gros; Vincenzo Tomassi; Teresa Alcocer
- Music by: Jacques Lacome
- Production companies: Comptoir Français du Film Production; Fida Cinematografica; Producciones Cinematográficas Balcázar
- Distributed by: C.F.F.P.; Fida
- Release dates: 10 February 1967 (France); 29 July 1967 (Italy); 11 August 1967 (Spain)
- Running time: 97 minutes
- Countries: France; Italy; Spain

Mexican Slayride (French: Coplan ouvre le feu à Mexico, Italian: Moresque - Obiettivo allucinante, Spanish: Entre las redes) is a 1967 Eurospy film directed by Riccardo Freda and starring Lang Jeffries. It is based on the Paul Kenny's novel Coplan fait peau neuve and it is the fifth chapter in the Francis Coplan film series.

== Plot ==
French SDECE agent Francis Coplan is given the task of finding priceless artwork stolen by the Germans in 1943 (including a Rembrandt). His investigations lead him to Mexico, where Coplan finds the paintings in the possession of a secret organization, which he will have to face-off to regain the paintings.

== Cast ==
- Lang Jeffries as Francis Coplan
- Sabine Sun as The Countess
- José María Caffarel as Langis
- Robert Party as le vieux
- Frank Oliveras as Fondane
- Guido Lollobrigida as Montez
- Guy Marly as Dr. Krauz
- Luciana Gilli as Maya
- Silvia Solar as Francine
- Osvaldo Genazzani

== Release ==
Mexican Slayride was first released in France on 10 February 1967 where it was distributed theatrically by C.F.F.P. It later was distributed in Italy by Fida on 29 July 1967 as well as being released theatrically in Spain on 11 August 1967.
