= Escape to Nowhere (1973 film) =

1973 film by Claude Pinoteau

- The Great Manhunt (1973) poster
- Directed by: Claude Pinoteau
- Written by: Francis Ryck
- Screenplay by: Jean-Loup Dabadie; Claude Pinoteau
- Based on: Drôle de pistolet by Francis Ryck (1969)
- Produced by: Gaumont
- Cinematography: Jean Boffety
- Music by: Jacques Datin; Alain Goraguer
- Release date: 1973 (France)
- Running time: 117 minutes
- Countries: France; Italy
- Language: French

Escape to Nowhere (French: Le Silencieux, lit. 'The Silent One', also known as The Great Manhunt) is a 1973 Franco-Italian thriller film directed by Claude Pinoteau, and starring Lino Ventura. It is an adaptation of the novel Drôle de pistolet by Francis Ryck (1969).

== Plot ==
When a Soviet scientific delegation arrives in London, the British secret services kidnap one of its members and pass him off as dead. He is in fact a French scientist, Clément Tibère, kidnapped by the KGB sixteen years earlier. Refusing to collaborate at first for fear of pressure and death threats, Tibère ends up agreeing to denounce the corrupt English scientists participating in the delegation. The British then release him under a new identity. But, immediately, the KGB hunts him down. He then tries to return to France and find a way to escape the manhunt.

== Cast and roles ==
- Lino Ventura as Anton Haliakov / Clément Tibère
- Lea Massari as Maria Menela
- Suzanne Flon as Jeanne
- Leo Genn as the gentleman of MI5
- Bernard Dhéran as Mr. Chat
- Robert Party as the tueur in the train
- Pierre-Michel Le Conte as Boris Korodine
- Lucienne Legrand as a librarian
- Pierre Collet as a mechanic
- Roger Crouzet as a DST agent
- André Falcon as the police commissioner
- Pierre Forget as a smoker in the train
- Michel Duplaix as a DST analyst
- Michel Fortin as a trucker
- Linda Gray (Note: She is not the Americain Linda Gray (born in 1940), but of the British homonym Linda Gray (1905-1995) ; see item for her: Linda Gray at IMDb) as Ms Hardy, a corrupt British scientist
- Robert Hardy as MI5 assistant
- George Pravda
- Pierre Zimmer as Maria's new husband
- Jeffry Wickham as a KGB translator agent

== Music ==
British rock singer Jenny Darren recorded the song How Soon Hello Becomes Goodbye, an instrumental version of which is featured in the film. The recording was released by Decca Records as the B-side to Darren's version of Phil Spector's hit "Be My Baby". The single, which was produced and arranged by pianist Mike Moran (a collaborator of Lynsey de Paul), was released in France, Belgium and the United Kingdom. The song was written by J. Datin, A. Goraguer and B. Mason. Later, in 1977, Darren collaborated with AC/DC on the Dirty Deeds tour.
