= Francis Coplan =

Fictional French secret agent

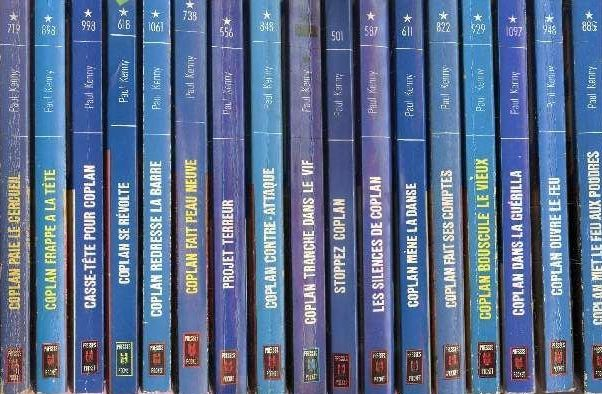
Books by Francis Coplan.

Francis Coplan (Agent FX 18) is a fictional French secret agent created by Paul Kenny, the nom de plume of Belgian authors Gaston Van den Panhuyse (1913–1995) and Jean Libert (1913–1981). He first appeared in print in 1953, and has since appeared in over 200 novels. He appeared in six Eurospy films released in the 1950s and 1960s (in each one played by a different actor), as well as a 1989 French miniseries and a long-running comic strip.

== Appearances ==
Francis Coplan was an electronics engineer recruited by the SDECE. From his first appearance in Fleuve Noir Sans Issue/No Exit in 1953 until Sales coups à moscou pour Coplan in 1996, 237 novels of Coplan were written using the name of Paul Kenny. After the death of Libert, Van den Punhuyse carried on writing alone. After his death Serge Jacquemard took over until 1996. Van den Punhyse and Libert also wrote 18 science fiction novels under the name "Jean-Gaston Vandel" for Fleuve Noir's "Anticipation" series from 1952-1956 until the success of Coplan led them to write his adventures on a full-time basis.

By 1970, Coplan books were selling 3.5 million copies a year around the world.

== Films ==
- Action immédiate (To Catch a Spy, 1957) (based on the novel Action immédiate), starring Henri Vidal, directed by Maurice Labro, a French film set in Geneva
- Coplan Agent Secret FX 18 (FX 18 Secret Agent, 1964) (based on Coplan tente sa chance), starring Ken Clark, directed by Maurice Cloche, a French-Italian-Spanish coproduction partially shot in Corsica
- Coplan prend des risques (The Spy I Love, 1964) (based on Étau sans pitié), starring Dominique Paturel, directed by Maurice Labro, French-Italian-Belgian coproduction about defense industrial espionage in France
- Coplan FX 18 casse tout (FX 18 Superspy or The Exterminators, 1965) (based on Stoppez Coplan), starring Richard Wyler, directed by Riccardo Freda, a French-Italian coproduction set and shot in Turkey
- Coplan ouvre le feu à Mexico (Mexican Slayride, 1967) (based on Coplan fait peau neuve), starring Lang Jeffries, directed by Riccardo Freda, a French-Italian-Spanish coproduction set in Mexico but shot in Mexico and Spain
- Coplan sauve se peau (Coplan Saves His Skin, 1968) (based on Coplan paie le cercueil), starring Claudio Brook, directed by Yves Boisset, a French-Italian-Turkish coproduction set and shot in Turkey

== Television series ==
Coplan (1989) 6 episodes, with Philippe Caroit

== Comic strips ==
Over 3,000 strips by Pol Greffiere (nom de plume of Pierre leGoff)
