= The Girl with the Whip (1952 film) =

- Directed by: Jean Dréville
- Written by: Ernst Zahn (novel); Jeanne Humbert
- Starring: Michel Simon; Gaby Morlay; Colette Darfeuil
- Cinematography: Marc Fossard
- Edited by: Jean Feyte; Henri Rust
- Music by: Bernard Schulé
- Production company: Les Films Monopole
- Distributed by: Jeannic Films
- Release date: 26 September 1952
- Running time: 82 minutes
- Country: Switzerland
- Language: French

The Girl with the Whip (French: La fille au fouet) is a 1952 Swiss drama film directed by Jean Dréville and starring Michel Simon, Gaby Morlay and Colette Darfeuil. It was shot at the Boulogne Studios in Paris. The film's sets were designed by the art director Robert Dumesnil. A separate German version, The Secret of the Mountain Lake, was also made.

== Cast ==
- Michel Simon as Le tuteur d'Angelina
- Gaby Morlay as Lamberta
- Colette Darfeuil as Lorenza
- Pauline Carton as La bonne
- Véronique Deschamps as Angelina / Pietro
- Marcelle Géniat as Madame Pons
- Lydie Lord
- Claire Gérard as La femme de Borgo
- Roger Burkart
- Andrews Engelmann as Le directeur de la prison
- Mariette Ellys
- Rudy Lenoir
- Abel Barthelemo as L'accordéoniste
- Philippe Derevel as Le ténor
- Howard Vernon as Borgo
- Michel Barbey as Calixe

== Bibliography ==
- Rège, Philippe. Encyclopedia of French Film Directors, Volume 1. Scarecrow Press, 2009.
