= Coplan Takes Risks =

1964 film

- Directed by: Maurice Labro
- Written by: Paul Kenny (novel); François Chavane; Pascal Jardin; Jean Marsan; Jean-Louis Roncoroni
- Produced by: François Chavane
- Starring: Dominique Paturel; Virna Lisi; Jacques Balutin
- Cinematography: Pierre Petit
- Edited by: Germaine Artus
- Music by: Georges Van Parys
- Production companies: Cibélux; Cinéphonic; Da.Ma. Cinematografica
- Distributed by: Gaumont Distribution
- Release date: 6 May 1964
- Running time: 89 minutes
- Countries: Belgium; France; Italy
- Language: French

Coplan Takes Risks (French: Coplan prend des risques) is a 1964 spy film directed by Maurice Labro and starring Dominique Paturel, Virna Lisi and Jacques Balutin. It was made as a co-production between Belgium, France and Italy, and was part of a boom in Eurospy films in the wake of James Bond's popularity

The film's sets were designed by the art director Jean Mandaroux.

== Plot ==
In a French factory working for French National Defense, an employee steals a prototype. SDECE agent FX-18 Francis Coplan is sent to handle the case.

== Cast ==
- Dominique Paturel as Francis Coplan
- Virna Lisi as Ingrid Carlsen
- Jacques Balutin as Fondane
- Roger Dutoit as Bianco
- Jacques Monod as Le "vieux"
- André Valmy as Pelletier
- Yves Arcanel as
- Marcel Charvey
- Yvonne Clech as Madame Rochon
- Dominique Davray as Prostitute
- Eugene Deckers
- Albert Dinan
- Tommy Duggan as Stratton
- Gisèle Grandpré
- Guy Kerner as Rochon
- Henri Lambert as Scarpelli
- Margo Lion as Mme Slassinka
- Monique Morisi
- Alain Nobis
- Anna Vallon
- André Weber as Legay

== Bibliography ==
- Van Heuckelom. Polish Migrants in European Film 1918–2017. Springer, 2019.
