= If All the Guys in the World =

1956 by Christian-Jaque

- Directed by: Christian-Jaque
- Written by: Jacques Rémy (Scénario de); Henri-Georges Clouzot (adaptation et Dialogue de); Christian Jaque (avec la collaboration de); Jean Ferry; Jérôme Géronimi; Jacques Rémy
- Starring: André Valmy; Jean Gaven; Marc Cassot; Georges Poujouly; Doudou Babet
- Cinematography: Armand Thirard
- Edited by: Jacques Desagneaux
- Music by: Georges Van Parys
- Color process: Black and white
- Production companies: Les Films Ariane; Cinétel; Filmsonor; Francinex
- Distributed by: Cinédis
- Release date: 24 February 1956
- Running time: 112 minutes
- Country: France
- Language: French

If All the Guys in the World (original French title: Si tous les gars du monde) is a 1956 French adventure film directed by Christian-Jaque and starring André Valmy, Jean Gaven, Marc Cassot, Georges Poujouly, Doudou Babet.

== Plot ==
A French fishing trawler crew in the North Sea becomes incapacitated after eating contaminated food while in the middle of a storm. The story follows the efforts of an international collection of amateur radio operators to deliver an antidote.

== Cast ==
- André Valmy as Le capitaine Pierre Le Guellec
- Jean Gaven as Jos - le second
- Marc Cassot as Marcel
- Georges Poujouly as Benj - le mouusse
- Doudou Babet as Mohammed (as Doudou-Babet)
- Hélène Perdrière as Christine Largeau (as Hélène Perdrière de la Comédie Française)
- Claude Sylvain as Totoche
- Jean-Louis Trintignant as Jean-Louis (as J.L. Trintignant)
- Andrex as Le docteur Largarrigue
- Yves Brainville as Le docteur Jégou
- Jean Clarieux as Riri
- Mimo Billi as Alberto
- Bernard Dhéran as Saint-Savin (as Bernard Dhéran de la Comédie Française)
- Pierre Goutas as Yann
- Jean Daurand as Yves
- Jacques Dhéry as Alain - un marin du Lutèce
- Pierre Latour as Guillaume - un marin du Lutèce
- Henri Maïk as François - le premier marin malade du Lutèce (as Maïk)
- Jacques Sablon as Un marin du Lutèce
- Charles Jarrel as Mitch (as Charles Jarrell)
- Gardy Granass as Herta Baumeister
- Mathias Wieman as Karl Baumeister
- Peter Walker as Johnny
- Ebbe Moe as Olaf
- Lt-Pilote Juillard as Le pilote norvégien
- Margaret Rung as L'hôtesse de l'air polonaise (as Margarethe Rung)
- Diana Bel as L'hôtesse d'Air France
- Bernadette Lange as Madame Le Guelle
- Camille Fourier as La mère de Benj
- Constantin Nepo as Le capitaine russe
- Roger Dumas as Jean-Pierre
- Jacques Donot as Le speaker

== See also ==
- List of French films of 1956
