= Hungarian Rhapsody (disambiguation) =

The Hungarian Rhapsodies are set of 19 piano pieces based on Hungarian folk themes, composed by Franz Liszt.

Hungarian Rhapsody may also refer to:

- Hungarian Rhapsody (1928 film), a German silent drama film
- Hungarian Rhapsody (1954 film), a French-German historical musical film
- Hungarian Rhapsody (1979 film), a Hungarian drama film
- Hungarian Rhapsody: Queen Live in Budapest, a concert film of the British rock band Queen
