= Guy Kerner =

French stage and film actor

- Born: 28 January 1922; Levallois-Perret
- Died: 5 April 1984 (aged 62); Rambouillet
- Occupation(s): stage and film actor

Guy Kerner (28 January 1922 – 5 April 1984) was a 20th-century French stage and film actor.

He is buried at the cemetery of Condé-sur-Vesgre (Yvelines).

== Filmography ==
=== Cinema ===
- 1952: Trial at the Vatican by André Haguet as l'appariteur
- 1954: Queen Margot by Jean Dréville as le Henry I, Duke of Guise
- 1955: Les Salauds vont en enfer by Robert Hossein as l'artiste peintre, Éva's lover
- 1958: Thérèse Étienne by Denys de La Patellière as le juge
- 1962: Le Gorille a mordu l'archevêque by Maurice Labro
- 1964: Coplan Takes Risks by Maurice Labro as Rochon
- 1970: Dernier domicile connu by José Giovanni (after the novel by Joseph Harrington) as the doctor
- 1973: Le Désir et la volupté by Julien Saint-Clair
- 1979: La Dérobade by Daniel Duval
- 1981: Votre enfant m'intéresse by Jean-Michel Carré
- 1984: Les Ripoux by Claude Zidi as le président

=== Television ===
- 1959: Les Cinq Dernières Minutes, episode On a tué le mort by Claude Loursais as Paul Heyrieux, le fondé de pouvoir
- 1959: La caméra explore le temps, episode Le véritable Aiglon by Stellio Lorenzi as Apponyi
- 1961: La caméra explore le temps, episode Les Templiers by Stellio Lorenzi as Charles de Lorraine, brother of the king
- 1962: La caméra explore le temps, episode Le Meurtre d'Henry Darnley ou La Double Passion of Marie Stuart by Guy Lessertisseur, as Georges Douglas
- 1963: Thierry la Fronde, episode Les Compagnons à Paris by Robert Guez as Des Essarts
- 1964: Rocambole, episode L'Héritage mystérieux, by Jean-Pierre Decourt, as the judge
- 1964: Les Armes de la nuit by Gilbert Pineau (after the novel by Vercors), as Pierre
- 1964: Thierry la Fronde, episode La Bague du dauphin by Robert Guez, as Des Essarts
- 1964: Thierry la Fronde, episode Brétigny by Robert Guez as Des Essarts
- 1965: Merlusse by Georges Folgoas (after Marcel Pagnol), as le surveillant général
- 1965: Les Cinq Dernières Minutes, episode Bonheur à tout prix by Claude Loursais, as: the doctor
- 1965: Thierry la Fronde, episode La route de Calais by Robert Guez, as Des Essarts
- 1965: La caméra explore le temps, episode L'Affaire Ledru by Stellio Lorenzi, as De Boudy
- 1966: Thierry la Fronde, episode Fausse monnaie by Robert Guez, as Des Essarts
- 1966: Thierry la Fronde, episode Jouets dangereux by Robert Guez as Des Essarts
- 1966: Thierry la Fronde, episode Échec au roi by Robert Guez, as Des Essarts
- 1966: Thierry la Fronde, episode La Fourche du Diable by Robert Guez, as Des Essarts
- 1966: Thierry la Fronde, episode Le Drame de Rouvres by Robert Guez, as Des Essarts
- 1966: Comment ne pas épouser un milliardaire by Lazare Iglésis (serial adapted from the novel by Luisa-Maria Linares), as le capitaine
- 1967: Le Golem by Jean Kerchbron (telefilm adapted from the novel by Gustav Meyrink), as le greffier
- 1968: Sérieux s'abstenir (telefilm)
- 1968: Une femme sans importance by Gilbert Pineau (téléfilm adapted from Oscar Wilde), as Lord Illingworth
- 1968: L'Idiot (from the novel by Fiodor Dostoïevski), adapted and directed by André Barsacq, as Totzki
- 1969: Le Petit monde de Marie-Plaisance by André Pergament (series)
- 1970: La Hobereaute (spoken opera by Jacques Audiberti), directed by Georges Vitaly, en différé de l'Hôtel de Béthune-Sully dans le cadre du Festival du Marais, réalisation de captation de pièce de théâtre de Philippe Laïk, as le maître Parfait
- 1971: La Mort des capucines, telefilm by Agnès Delarive, as Kérondic
- 1971: Quentin Durward (from the novel by Sir Walter Scott), TV series by Gilles Grangier as Tristan l'Hermite
- 1971: Le Soldat et la sorcière (by Armand Salacrou), telefilm by Jean-Paul Carrère, as l'aide de camp
- 1972: Le Père Goriot (after the novel by Honoré de Balzac), telefilm by Guy Jorré, as M. de Restaud
- 1973: La Porteuse de pain (after the novel by Xavier de Montépin), TV series by Marcel Camus, as le procureur
- 1973: L'Alphoméga, TV series by Lazare Iglésis
- 1973: Les Mohicans de Paris (after the novel by Alexandre Dumas), TV series by Gilles Grangier, as Jackal
- 1974: Gil Blas de Santillane (after the novel by Alain-René Lesage), TV series by Jean-Roger Cadet, as le comte de Lirias
- 1974: Ardéchois coeur fidèle, TV series by Jean-Pierre Gallo, as De Lentillac
- 1975: Salvator et Les Mohicans de Paris (from the novel by Alexandre Dumas), TV series by Bernard Borderie as Jackal
- 1975: Erreurs judiciaires, TV series by Alain Franck and Jean Laviron, as M. Buisson
- 1976: Le Cousin Pons (from the novel by Honoré de Balzac), telefilm by Guy Jorré, as Fritz Brunner
- 1977: Ne le dites pas avec des roses, TV series by Gilles Grangier
- 1977: Banlieue sud-est (from the novel by René Fallet), TV series by Gilles Grangier
- 1978: Émile Zola ou la Conscience humaine, TV series by Stellio Lorenzi, as le procureur
- 1978: Gaston Phébus (from the novel by Gaston de Béarn), TV series by Bernard Borderie, as Bertrand de Waast
- 1979: Grilles closes, telefilm by Henri Helman, as l'homme
- 1978–1980: Médecins de nuit, TV series
  - 1978: Jean-François, directed by Philippe Lefebvre
  - 1980: Henri Gillot retraité, directed by Pierre Lary, as Potat-Germain
- 1981: Raspail ou La passion de la République, screenplay by Pierre Dumayet, téléfilm, as le président du tribunal de Bourges
- 1983: Les Cinq Dernières Minutes, episode La Chine à paris, directed by François Martin, as M. Granier
- 1984: Hello Einstein by Lazare Iglesis

=== Au théâtre ce soir ===
- 1973: Ouragan sur le Caine by Herman Wouk, directed by André Villiers, TV director Georges Folgoas, Théâtre Marigny
- 1973: Marie-Octobre by Jacques Robert, Julien Duvivier, Henri Jeanson, directed by André Villiers, TV director Georges Folgoas, Théâtre Marigny
- 1974: Les Affaires sont les affaires by Octave Mirbeau, directed by Jean Meyer, TV director Georges Folgoas, Théâtre Marigny
- 1975: Quelqu'un derrière la porte by Jacques Robert, directed by André Villiers, TV director Pierre Sabbagh, Théâtre Édouard VII
- 1978: Le Colonel Chabert after Honoré de Balzac, directed by Jean Meyer, TV director Pierre Sabbagh, Théâtre Marigny
- 1978: Si tout le monde en faisait autant by John Boynton Priestley, directed by André Villiers, TV director Pierre Sabbagh, Théâtre Marigny
- 1980: Ninotchka by Melchior Lengyel, adaptation by Marc-Gilbert Sauvajon, directed by Jacques Ardouin, TV director Pierre Sabbagh, Théâtre Marigny

== Theatre ==
- 1953: Du plomb pour ces demoiselles by Frédéric Dard, directed by Georges Vitaly, Théâtre du Grand-Guignol
- 1954: L'Homme traqué by Frédéric Dard, directed by Robert Hossein, Théâtre du Casino municipal Nice, Théâtre des Noctambules
- 1955: Sud by Julien Green, directed by Jean Mercure, Théâtre des Célestins
- 1955: Pour Lucrèce by Jean Giraudoux, directed by Jean-Louis Barrault, Théâtre des Célestins
- 1955: TTX by Cécil Saint-Laurent and Pierre de Meuse, directed by Alice Cocéa, Théâtre des Arts
- 1956: Thé et sympathie by Robert Anderson, directed by Jean Mercure, Théâtre de Paris
- 1961: Marie-Octobre by Jacques Robert, directed by André Villiers, Théâtre en Rond
- 1963: Le Sorcier by Christian Liger, directed by Marie-Claire Valène, Théâtre du Tertre
- 1965: L'Idiot by Fiodor Dostoïevski, adapted and directed by André Barsacq, Théâtre de l'Atelier
- 1968: La Dame de Chicago by Frédéric Dard, directed by Jacques Charon, Théâtre des Ambassadeurs
- 1968: Roméo et Juliette by William Shakespeare, directed by Michael Cacoyannis, TNP Théâtre de Chaillot
- 1969: La Hobereaute spoken opera by Jacques Audiberti, directed by Georges Vitaly, Hôtel de Béthune-Sully
- 1969: L'Aiglon by Edmond Rostand, directed by Jacques Sereys, Théâtre du Chatelet
- 1971: Dumas le magnifique by Alain Decaux, directed by Julien Bertheau, Théâtre du Palais-Royal
- 1971: Le Dieu Kurt by Alberto Moravia, directed by Pierre Franck, Théâtre des Célestins, Théâtre Michel
- 1973: Business is business by Octave Mirbeau, directed by Jean Meyer, théâtre des Célestins
- 1974: Les Bienfaits de la culture by Aleksey Nikolayevich Tolstoy, directed by Jean Meyer, Théâtre des Célestins
- 1977: Hamlet by William Shakespeare, directed by Julien Bertheau, Théâtre des Célestins
- 1980: Talleyrand à la barre de l'histoire by André Castelot, directed by Paul-Émile Deiber, Théâtre du Palais-Royal
