= Lawless Roads =

1947 French film

- Directed by: Guillaume Radot
- Written by: Francis Vincent-Bréchignac
- Produced by: Hubert Vincent-Bréchignac
- Starring: Ginette Leclerc; Jean Murat; Marguerite Moreno
- Cinematography: Georges Million
- Edited by: Pierre Caillet
- Music by: Maurice Thiriet
- Production company: Films Guillaume Radot
- Distributed by: Films Roger Richebé
- Release date: 17 June 1947
- Running time: 83 minutes
- Country: France
- Language: French

Lawless Roads (French: Chemins sans loi) is a 1947 French drama film directed by Guillaume Radot and starring Ginette Leclerc, Jean Murat and Marguerite Moreno. It was shot at the Billancourt Studios in Paris. The film's sets were designed by the art director Marcel Magniez.

== Synopsis ==
Inès, a gypsy has a relationship with a landowner but he abandons her. Pregnant she falls in with a gang of horse thieves, and brings up her daughter Dolorès amongst them.

== Cast ==
- Ginette Leclerc as Inès
- Jean Murat as Florent Lemercier
- Marguerite Moreno as Hélène
- Madeleine Rousset as Dolorès
- José Conrad as L'Araignée
- Michel Barbey as Petit-Plon
- Jean Clarieux as Dem
- Alfred Baillou as Julien, le bossu
- Grégoire Gromoff as La Douceur
- Albert Dagnant
- Claudine Dupuis
- Jacqueline François
- Paul Oettly

== Bibliography ==
- Rège, Philippe. Encyclopedia of French Film Directors, Volume 1. Scarecrow Press, 2009.
