= A Foolish Maiden (1938 film) =

1938 film directed by Henri Diamant-Berger

- Directed by: Henri Diamant-Berger
- Written by: Jean Nohain; Pierre Rocher; Roger Vitrac; Charles de Peyret-Chappuis
- Based on: A Foolish Maiden by Henry Bataille
- Produced by: Michael Salkind
- Starring: Victor Francen; Annie Ducaux; Juliette Faber
- Cinematography: Nick De Belaieff; Maurice Desfassiaux
- Edited by: Pierre de Hérain
- Music by: Michel Michelet
- Production company: Le Film d'Art
- Distributed by: Open Art Productions
- Release date: 24 April 1938
- Running time: 90 minutes
- Country: France
- Language: French

A Foolish Maiden (French: La vierge folle) is a 1938 French drama film directed by Henri Diamant-Berger and starring Victor Francen, Annie Ducaux and Juliette Faber. It was based on a play of the same title by Henry Bataille which had previously been made into a 1929 silent film A Foolish Maiden. The film's sets were designed by the art directors Hugues Laurent and Raymond Druart.

== Cast ==
- Victor Francen as Marcel Armaury
- Annie Ducaux as Fanny Armaury
- Juliette Faber as Gisèle
- Gabrielle Dorziat as La mère de Gisèle
- Michel André as Gaston
- Raymond Galle
- Denise Kerny
- Henri Guisol
- Claire Gérard
- René Génin
- Marie Déa
- Georges Cahuzac
- Marianne Brack
- Roger Berger
- Colette Proust
- Robert Ozanne
- Nelly Marny
- Paul Demange
- Jacqueline Christin
- Fernand Liesse
- Henry Duval
- Frédéric Mariotti

== Bibliography ==
- Goble, Alan. The Complete Index to Literary Sources in Film. Walter de Gruyter, 1999.
- Rège, Philippe. Encyclopedia of French Film Directors, Volume 1. Scarecrow Press, 2009.
