= The New Adventures of Vidocq =

French-West German television series

- German DVD cover
- Genre: Crime
- Written by: Georges Neveux
- Directed by: Marcel Bluwal
- Starring: Claude Brasseur; Danièle Lebrun
- Composer: Jacques Loussier
- Countries of origin: France; West Germany
- Original languages: French; German
- No. of series: 2
- No. of episodes: 13

Production
- Running time: 55 minutes
- Production companies: Gaumont Television; Bavaria Film; Office de Radiodiffusion Télévision Française; Télécip

Original release
- Network: ORTF; ARD
- Release: 5 January 1971 – 10 December 1973

The New Adventures of Vidocq (French: Les nouvelles aventures de Vidocq, German: Die Abenteuer des Monsieur Vidocq) is a historical crime television series which originally ran from 1971 to 1973. It was a co-production between France and West Germany, with shooting taking place partly at the Bavaria Studios in Munich. The main character is based on the life of Eugène François Vidocq, an early nineteenth century criminal turned crime-fighter. A previous series Vidocq had been made in 1967.

== Main cast ==
- Claude Brasseur as François Vidocq
- Danièle Lebrun as Baronne de Saint-Gely
- Marc Dudicourt as Flambart
- Jacques Seiler as Desfossé
- Pierre Pernet as L'acrobate
- Alain MacMoy as Le marquis de Modène
- Walter Buschhoff as Le docteur
- Robert Party as Fouché

== Bibliography ==
- Malcolm Anderson. In Thrall to Political Change: Police and Gendarmerie in France. OUP, 2011.
- Jean-Pierre Mattei. Napoléon & le cinéma: un siècle d'images. Editions Alain Piazzola, 1998.
