= Le Sabre de mon père =

1951 surrealist play written by Roger Vitrac

Le Sabre de mon père (transl. My father's sabre) is a surrealist play written by Roger Vitrac which premiered at Théâtre de Paris in 1951.

== Original cast ==
- Mise-en-scène: Pierre Dux
- Settings: Félix Labisse
- Costumes: Rosine Delamare
- Roles and interpreters:
  - Françoise Dujardin: Sophie Desmarets
  - Édouard Dujardin: Pierre Dux
  - Pierre Martignac: Max Palenc
  - Adélaïde Poinsot: Claire Gérard
  - Boussu: Noël Roquevert
  - Albert Feuillade: Jean Lagache
  - Docteur Laborderie: Charles Dechamps
  - Nini: Anne Vitrac
  - Clémence: Luce Clament
  - Simon: Serge Lecointe
  - Flore Médard: Marcelle Arnold
  - Diane Condé: Geneviève Berney
  - Popaul: Jean-Jacques Duverger
  - Isabelle Laborderie: Janine Liezer
  - Pierril: René Génin

== Critics ==
Initially the play was unsuccessful and disliked by critics, even by those who were at the time supporting surrealist arts of this kind. Some of these critics explained that the title was not as explicit as they had wished.

The play was defended by Jean Anouilh, who proclaimed: "We are some in the art who have been working since the last war to strangle the anecdote, to kill the idea of a good play that ruled the French theater [...] to the point of reducing it to the status of a mummy. [...] The play is good, no? Well, no. Neither Colombe nor Le Sabre is good plays. But if the actors play "like gods", it's because they have characters otherwise, they don't play well. [...] And then, let architecture be left to the construction specialists. The theater is a game of the mind and mind may well make honey in foraging in detail, like a bee." Anouilh echoes Robert Kemp who stated in his article: "That Sabre, good in details and which, taken line by line, do not lack of taste but is overall, after all, insignificant..."
