= Ford Star Revue =

TV show aired from 1950-1951

- Genre: Variety
- Written by: Norman Lear; Ed Simmons
- Presented by: Jack Haley
- Music by: The Carl Hoff Orchestra
- Country of origin: United States

Original release
- Network: NBC
- Release: July 6, 1950 – March 29, 1951

Ford Star Revue is an American television variety series that was broadcast on NBC as the summer replacement for Kay Kyser's Kollege of Musical Knowledge from July 6, 1950, to September 28, 1950. It returned on January 4, 1951, and ended on March 29, 1951.

== Personnel ==
Jack Haley was the show's host, and Mindy Carson was featured as a singer. Other regulars on the show were the Havel Brothers. Dr. Roy K. Marshall, and the Ted Adolphus Dancers. The Carl Hoff Orchestra provided music. When a kidney ailment hit Haley during the dress rehearsal for the February 15, 1951, episode, leaving him unable to perform, Carson took over the MC aspects of Haley's role. Bob Haymes, who was watching the rehearsal, performed the songs that had been scheduled for Haley, and Jack Albertson was recruited to substitute in Haley's comedy segments. Guest performers on the series included Jack La Rue, Lauritz Melchior, Jackie Gleason, Morey Amsterdam, Henny Youngman, Ed Wynn, Colette Marchand, and the dance team of Honi Coles and Cholly Atkins.

== Production ==
Ford Star Revue was broadcast from 9 to 10 p.m. Eastern Time on Thursdays. Its writers included Norman Lear (his initial writing for TV) and Ed Simmons. The 1951 version of Ford Star Revue was replaced by Ford Festival.

== Critical response ==
After the show had been on the air for a month in 1950, a review in the trade publication Variety said that Ford Star Revue "has seldom hit top stride since its inception". It noted that Ford had failed to make the program a "potent selling medium through lack of program competition."

Bob Foster wrote in the San Mateo Times that the second 1951 episode of the show was better than the first. He complimented the performances of guest stars and those of Haley and Carson in the second week. The review concluded, "Although there is definitely a lot of room for improvement, we feel that Haley will come through and in a very few weeks will rate well ..."

Ben Gross wrote in the New York Daily News that the show's initial 1951 episode "had a considerable number of attractive facets", but it suffered from poor writing. He cited one comedy sketch in which, before it ended, "the lines had bogged down in the mire of mediocrity," and added that despite "a few flashes of real fun", the overall result was "a mild tedium". Gross questioned why Melchior sang a semi-classical song rather than one of the operatic arias for which he was famous and concluded that until Haley "gets the proper material, he will be only so-so in television."

Writing in the Brooklyn Eagle, Bob Lanigan called the show's next-to-last episode "one of the best full-hour shows ever seen on this series." He complimented the performances of Haley and the "strong supporting cast". Noting that the upcoming episode would be the show's last, Lanigan wrote, "Too bad. He [Haley] just was hitting his TV stride."
