= It Is Midnight, Doctor Schweitzer =

1952 film

- Directed by: André Haguet
- Written by: André Haguet; André Legrand
- Based on: It Is Midnight, Doctor Schweitzer by Gilbert Cesbron
- Produced by: Louis Brunet
- Starring: Pierre Fresnay; Raymond Rouleau; Jean Debucourt; Jeanne Moreau
- Cinematography: Lucien Joulin
- Edited by: Charles Bretoneiche
- Music by: Maurice-Paul Guillot
- Production company: Nordia Films
- Distributed by: Cocinor
- Release date: 19 November 1952
- Running time: 95 minutes
- Country: France
- Language: French

It Is Midnight, Doctor Schweitzer (French: Il est minuit, docteur Schweitzer) is a 1952 French biographical drama film directed by André Haguet and starring Pierre Fresnay, Raymond Rouleau and Jean Debucourt. The film was adapted from a play of the same title by Gilbert Cesbron based on the life of Albert Schweitzer. It was shot at the Billancourt Studios in Paris and on location in Gabon. The film's sets were designed by the art director Roland Quignon. The film was released the same year that Schweitzer was awarded with the Nobel Peace Prize.

== Synopsis ==
Before the First World War Alsatian humanitarian Albert Schweitzer travels to French Equatorial Africa to do battle against infectious diseases that afflict the inhabitants. However the outbreak of war leads to his being interned.

== Cast ==
- Pierre Fresnay as Le docteur Albert Schweitzer
- Raymond Rouleau as Le commandant Lieuvin
- Jean Debucourt as Le père Charles
- Jeanne Moreau as Marie Winter
- Georges Chamarat as Le professeur
- Michel Marsay as Jean
- Jany Vallières as Madame Cristal
- Jean Lanier as Monsieur Cristal
- Candy Wells as Joseph
- André Valmy as L'administrateur Leblanc
- André Wasley as
- Abdoulaye Dramé
- Soumah Mangué

== Bibliography ==
- Bessy, Maurice & Chirat, Raymond. Histoire du cinéma français: 1951-1955. Pygmalion, 1989.
- Goble, Alan. The Complete Index to Literary Sources in Film. Walter de Gruyter, 1999.
- Rège, Philippe. Encyclopedia of French Film Directors, Volume 1. Scarecrow Press, 2009.
