= Claude-André Puget =

French playwright (1905–1975)

Claude-André Puget (22 June 1905, in Nice – 14 August 1975) was a 20th-century French playwright and screenwriter.

== Theatre ==
=== Plays ===
- 1932: La Ligne de cœur
- 1933: Valentin le Désossé
- 1937: Tourterelle
- 1938: Les Jours heureux
- 1938: Nuit et jour
- 1941: Échec à Don Juan, directed by Alice Cocea, Théâtre des Ambassadeurs, 19 December
- 1944: Le Grand Poucet
- 1944: Un petit ange de rien du tout
- 1946: Le Saint Bernard, two-act comedy, directed by Pierre Fresnay, Théâtre des Bouffes-Parisiens, 3 October
- 1948: La Peine capitale
- 1949: Miss Mabel
- 1951: Le Roi de la fête
- 1954: Un nommé Judas
- 1957: Le Cœur volant
- 1963: Le Déjeuner de Louveciennes
- 1963: Le Roi de la fête
- 1969: On ne saurait penser à rien
- 1972: La Lumière noire
- 1973: Le Château perdu

=== Adaptations ===
- 1945: Le Printemps de la Saint Martin by Noël Coward, directed by Jean Meyer, Théâtre de la Potinière
- 1977: Pygmalion by George Bernard Shaw, directed by Raymond Gérôme, Théâtre de Paris

== Filmography ==
- 1941: Happy Days by Jean de Marguenat
- 1942: Happy Days by Gianni Franciolini
- 1960: The Hero of My Dreams by Arthur Maria Rabenalt

=== Screenwriter ===
- 1930: Le Petit Chaperon rouge (songs)
- 1934: Mauvaise Graine by Billy Wilder
- 1936: Adventure in Paris by Marc Allégret
- 1936: The Terrible Lovers by Marc Allégret
- 1937: Woman of Malacca by Marc Allégret
- 1941: Happy Days by Jean de Marguenat
- 1943: Les Deux Timides by Yves Allégret
- 1943: Lucrèce by Léo Joannon
- 1945: Carmen by Christian-Jaque
- 1950: Véronique by Robert Vernay
- 1954: A Slice of Life (Tempi nostri)
- 1959: Venetian Honeymoon by Alberto Cavalcanti
