= The Exterminators (film) =

- Directed by: Riccardo Freda
- Screenplay by: Claude-Marcel Richard
- Based on: Stopez Coplan by: Gaston Van den Panhuyse; Jean Libert
- Produced by: Robert de Nesle
- Starring: Richard Stapley; Robert Manuel; Jany Clair; Valeria Ciangottini; Maria-Rosa Rodriguez
- Cinematography: Henri Persin
- Edited by: Renée Lichtig
- Music by: Michel Magne
- Production companies: Comptoir Français du Film Production; Camera Films; Cinerad–Cinematografica Radici
- Distributed by: C.F.F.P. (France); Fida Cinematografica (Italy)
- Release dates: 11 October 1965 (France); 26 March 1966 (Italy)
- Running time: 96 minutes
- Countries: France; Italy

The Exterminators (French: Coplan FX 18 casse tout) is a 1965 spy film directed by Riccardo Freda. It was the fourth in the Francis Coplan series of films. It was released in the United Kingdom as The Exterminators and on television in the United States as FX 18 Superspy.

== Plot ==
French SDECE agent Francis Coplan (Agent Fx-18) is sent to save an atomic scientist, in the meanwhile uncovering a plot by terrorists and a secret atomic site in Turkey.

== Cast ==
- Richard Stapley as Coplan
- Robert Manuel as Hartung
- Jany Clair as Héléna Jordan
- Valeria Ciangottini as Gelda
- Maria-Rosa Rodriguez as Sheila

== Production ==
The Exterminators was the second film director Riccardo Freda made for Comptoir Français du Film Production (C.F.F.P.). Producer Robert de Nesle's idea of for the film was to adapt Gérard de Villiers' popular S.A.S. novels, but he could not obtain the rights. This led to Freda making the fourth film in the Coplan series. The Coplan films were based on novels by Belgian writers Gaston Van den Panhuyse and Jean Libert. The lead in the film was Richard Stapley, who spoke positively about working with the director, describing him as "a very good director whom everyone thought should be working on much better things than this lowbudget spy film."

The film was filmed on location in Korem, Turkey and Paris between 24 June and 9 August 1965. Two endings for the film were shot, one with Coplan ending up with a girl played by De Nesle's girlfriend at the time. Stapley described her acting in the scene as "so inept that the scene couldn't be used."

== Release ==
The Exterminators was distributed theatrically by C.F.F.P. in France on 11 October 1965 with a 96-minute running time. It was later distributed theatrically by Fida Cinematografica in Italy as Agente 777 missione Summergame with an 83-minute running time. The film did not receive a theatrical release in the United States, but played on television in Los Angeles in 1968 as FX 18 Superspy.

== Reception ==
From contemporary reviews, Monthly Film Bulletin noted that "locations [were] used to imaginative effect", that the action scenes were "vividly staged", and that "it shows that Freda can do for the spy-frolic what he did for Dr. Hichcock and the swashbuckler spectacular." The review concluded that the film would make reviewers "momentarily forget the material is so indifferent" and "Freda almost managed to pull off an entertaining thriller." In France, Image et son's reviewer said, "two or three gadgets and as many private jokes are not enough to save an insignificant mise-en-scène at the service of a stupid story."
