= Robert de Nesle =

French film producer

- Born: 1 August 1906; Rouen, Seine-Maritime, France
- Died: 21 April 1978 (aged 71); Paris, France
- Occupation: Producer
- Years active: 1939–1983 (film)

Robert de Nesle (1906–1978) was a French film producer. He controlled the production company Comptoir Français de Productions Cinématographiques (CFPC).

== Selected filmography ==
- The Nude Dancer (1952)
- Sins of Paris (1953)
- Soyez les bienvenus (1953)
- After You Duchess (1954)
- The Count of Bragelonne (1954)
- Women's Prison (1958)
- Judex (1963)
- The Exterminators (1965)
- Congress of Love (1966)
- Trap for the Assassin (1966)
- Mexican Slayride (1967)
- The Three Fantastic Supermen (1967)
- Coplan Saves His Skin (1968)
- Dracula, Prisoner of Frankenstein (1972) (uncredited)
- Daughter of Dracula (1972) (uncredited)
- Devil's Island Lovers (1973) (uncredited)
