= Lucien Joulin =

French cinematographer

- Born: 29 April 1907; Paris, France
- Died: 8 February 1964 (aged 56); Nice, Alpes-Maritimes, France
- Occupation: Cinematographer
- Years active: 1933–1964 (film)

Lucien Joulin (1907–1964) was a French cinematographer. As well as working on feature films, he shot several documentaries.

== Selected filmography ==
- Madame Angot's Daughter (1935)
- If You Return (1938)
- Frederica (1942)
- The Farm of Seven Sins (1949)
- The Man from Jamaica (1950)
- Vendetta in Camargue (1950)
- Without Trumpet or Drum (1950)
- Victor (1951)
- The Beautiful Image (1951)
- Her Last Christmas (1952)
- Trial at the Vatican (1952)
- It Is Midnight, Doctor Schweitzer (1952)
- Alarm in Morocco (1953)
- The Count of Bragelonne (1954)
- Lord Rogue (1955)
- The Lebanese Mission (1956)
- The Singer from Mexico (1957)
- The Wheel (1957)
- Tabarin (1958)
- Serenade of Texas (1958)
- Cigarettes, Whiskey and Wild Women (1959)
- Thunder in the Blood (1960)
- Sun in Your Eyes (1962)
- Nick Carter va tout casser (1964)

== Bibliography ==
- Bertin-Maghit, Jean-Pierre. Propaganda Documentaries in France: 1940-1944. Rowman & Littlefield, 2016.
