= André Legrand =

French screenwriter (1896–1985)

- Born: 10 February 1896; Paris, France
- Died: 15 August 1985 (aged 89); Cannes, Alpes-Maritimes, France
- Other name: Henri-André Legrand
- Occupations: Writer, producer
- Years active: 1920-1971 (film)

André Legrand (1896–1985) was a French screenwriter and occasional film producer.

== Selected filmography ==
- Lord Arthur Savile's Crime (1922)
- Alexis, Gentleman Chauffeur (1938)
- White Nights in Saint Petersburg (1938)
- The Man from Niger (1940)
- Night in December (1940)
- Happy Days (1941)
- Miss Bonaparte (1942)
- The Newspaper Falls at Five O'Clock (1942)
- La Symphonie fantastique (1942)
- Shop Girls of Paris (1943)
- The Great Pack (1945)
- Dark Sunday (1948)
- Dance of Fire (1949)
- Shot at Dawn (1950)
- The Red Needle (1951)
- Trial at the Vatican (1952)
- It Is Midnight, Doctor Schweitzer (1952)
- At the Order of the Czar (1954)
- Hungarian Rhapsody (1954)
- Lord Rogue (1955)
- The Wheel (1957)
- Tabarin (1958)
- Thunder in the Blood (1960)
- Hardi Pardaillan! (1964)
- Nick Carter va tout casser (1964)

== Bibliography ==
- Goble, Alan. The Complete Index to Literary Sources in Film. Walter de Gruyter, 1999.
