= Coplan Saves His Skin =

1968 film

- Film poster
- Directed by: Yves Boisset
- Written by: Claude Veillot; Yves Boisset; Paul Kenny
- Produced by: Robert de Nesle
- Starring: Claudio Brook
- Cinematography: Alain Derobe; Pierre Lhomme
- Edited by: Claude Gros
- Release date: 21 June 1968
- Running time: 110 minutes
- Countries: France; Italy
- Language: French

Coplan Saves His Skin (French: Coplan sauve sa peau, Italian: L'assassino ha le ore contate) is a 1968 French-Italian Francis Coplan Eurospy film directed by Yves Boisset (at his directorial debut) and starring Claudio Brook. It is the last chapter in the Francis Coplan film series.

== Cast ==
- Claudio Brook - Francis Coplan
- Margaret Lee - Mara / Eva
- Jean Servais - Saroghu
- Bernard Blier - Marscar
- Jean Topart - Lieutenant Sakki
- Hans Meyer - Hugo
- Nanna Michael - Carole
- Klaus Kinski - Theler
- Marcella Saint-Amant - Yasmine
- Roger Lumont - Le glouton
- Roberto - Le nain / Dwarf
- Agatha Alma - Faith
- Andrea Aureli - Gamal (as Andrew Ray)
- Aldo Canti - Voyou (as Nick Jordan)
- Sergio Jossa - Barman
