= Thunder in the Blood =

1960 film

- Directed by: André Haguet; Jean-Paul Sassy
- Written by: André Haguet; André Legrand
- Produced by: Maggie Gillet
- Starring: Estella Blain; Harold Kay; Pierre-Jean Vaillard
- Cinematography: Lucien Joulin
- Edited by: Maurice Serein
- Music by: Marcel Stern
- Production companies: Compagnie Générale Cinématographique; Florida Films
- Release date: 24 June 1960
- Running time: 95 minutes
- Country: France
- Language: French

Thunder in the Blood (French: Colère froide) is a 1960 French mystery crime film directed by André Haguet and Jean-Paul Sassy and starring Estella Blain, Harold Kay and Pierre-Jean Vaillard. The film's sets were designed by the art director Roland Quignon.

== Cast ==
- Estella Blain as Catherine
- Harold Kay as Roland
- Pierre-Jean Vaillard as Girardier
- Jean-Marie Fertey as Alex
- Pierre Fromont as Christian Lambert
- Liliane Brousse as Georgina
- Jean Barrez
- Guy Henry
- Michel Nastorg
- Jean-Paul Thomas

== Bibliography ==
- Bessy, Maurice & Chirat, Raymond. Histoire du cinéma français: 1956-1960. Pygmalion, 1990.
- Rège, Philippe. Encyclopedia of French Film Directors, Volume 1. Scarecrow Press, 2009.
