= Tabarin (film) =

1958 film

- Directed by: Richard Pottier
- Written by: Jean Ferry; André Legrand; Richard Pottier
- Produced by: Gérard Fuchs; André Legrand
- Starring: Michel Piccoli; Sylvia Lopez; Annie Cordy
- Cinematography: Lucien Joulin
- Edited by: Maurice Serein
- Music by: Francis Lopez
- Production companies: Florida Films; Jeannic Films; Nepi Film
- Distributed by: EM
- Release date: 21 May 1958
- Running time: 110 min
- Countries: France; Italy
- Language: French

Tabarin is a 1958 French-Italian drama film, directed by Richard Pottier.

== Plot ==
Director of music hall Le Tabarin, Jacques Forestier has big ambitions for his establishment. He committed his former mistress, Florence, as "star" of the show, but she turns out all the maneuvers ready to become owner of Tabarin.

== Cast ==
- Michel Piccoli as Jacques Forestier
- Sylvia Lopez as Florence Didier
- Annie Cordy as Mimi
- Sonja Ziemann as Rosine Forestier
- Henri Vilbert as Morelli
- Mischa Auer as Boris
- Jean-Pierre Kérien as Larjac
- Germaine Damar as Brigitte
- Enrico Glori as Truffaut
- Luisella Boni as Simone
- Jean Lefebvre as Julien
- Kessler Twins as The twins
- Nicole Vattier as Madame Leroux
- Angelo Dessy as Paolo

== Production ==
The movie was released in France 21 May 1958, in Mexico, 29 January 1960 and in Denmark, 16 January 1961.
