= Colette Marchand =

French actress and dancer

- Born: Colette Janine Marchand; 29 April 1925; Paris, France
- Died: 5 June 2015 (aged 90); Bois-le-Roi, France
- Occupations: Dancer, actress
- Years active: 1951-1966
- Spouse: Jacques Bazire

Colette Janine Marchand (29 April 1925 – 5 June 2015) was a French prima ballerina and actress. She was nominated for the Academy Award for Best Supporting Actress in 1952 for her performance as Marie Charlet in Moulin Rouge, directed by John Huston.

During the height of her dance career she was considered one of the great dancers in Europe, known as Les jambes (The Legs), along with Violetta Elvin, Zizi Jeanmaire, Yvette Chauviré, Janine Charrat, and Margot Fonteyn. Marchand traveled around the world as a dancer and danced with many of the great ballet dancers of the 1940s and 1950s.

== Personal life ==
Marchand was born in Paris, the daughter of Alice (née Lioret) and Roger Marchand. She began her career at the Paris Opera Ballet

She married Jacques Bazire, the musical director for the Roland Petit Ballet. She died on 5 June 2015, aged 90.

== Career ==
She performed as a première ballerina on Broadway in Roland Petit's Les Ballets de Paris (1949 & 1950). In the 1950 show, Marchand performed a ballet piece titled The Boiled Egg, for which she received positive reviews. In 1951, she had a featured role in the Broadway musical Two on the Aisle, which ran for 276 performances. In the early 1950s while performing on Broadway, Marchand was featured in several magazines, including Life, and she made appearances on New York City television shows, including the Ford Star Revue, the Colgate Comedy Hour, and the Ed Sullivan Show.

In 1951, she lent her voice to Isidore Isou's Venom and Eternity. In 1952, she received a Golden Globe Award as Most Promising Newcomer - Female for her performance in Moulin Rouge as well as a nomination for the BAFTA for Most Promising Newcomer. In 1953 she was directed by Orson Welles in The Lady in the Ice. In 1954 she also appeared in Hungarian Rhapsody, Par Ordre du Tsar and the musical short Romantic Youth, the latter of which she was also a choreographer for.

== Filmography ==
Year	Title	Role	Notes
1951	Venom and Eternity		Voice
1952	Moulin Rouge	Marie Charlet	
1954	Hungarian Rhapsody	Caroline von Say-Wittgenstein	
1954	At the Order of the Czar	Princess Caroline	
