= Henry Kaye =

Henry Kay(e) may refer to:

- Henry Kaye (cricketer) (1875–1922), Middlesex CCC cricketer
- Henry Kay (1851–1922), Hampshire cricketer
- Henry Kaye (fl. 2000s–2020s), guitarist of The Static Jacks
- Sir Henry Kaye, 2nd Baronet (1889–1956) of the Kaye baronets

== See also ==
- Harry Kay (disambiguation)
