= Juliette Faber =

Luxembourgish actress

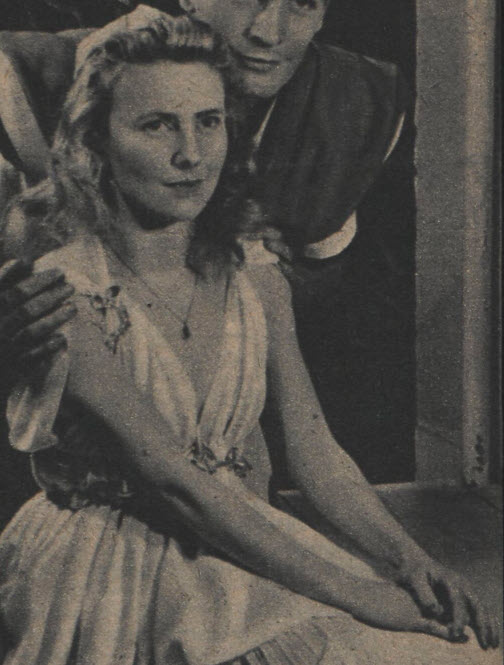
- Born: 19 March 1919; Grevenmacher, Luxembourg
- Died: 13 July 2008 (aged 89); Pontoise, France
- Occupation: Actress
- Years active: 1938–1995

Juliette Faber (1919–2008) was a Luxembourg-born French stage and film actress.

== Selected filmography ==
- A Foolish Maiden (1938)
- Happy Days (1941)
- Love Marriage (1942)
- The Strangers in the House (1942)
- Shop Girls of Paris (1943)
- Picpus (1943)
- The Temptation of Barbizon (1946)
- Passion for Life (1949)
- Justice Is Done (1950)
- Monsieur Octave (1951)
- The Convict (1951)
- The Case of Doctor Galloy (1951)
- We Are All Murderers (1952)
- Tides of Passion (1956)

== Bibliography ==
- Goble, Alan. The Complete Index to Literary Sources in Film. Walter de Gruyter, 1999.
