= Lord Rogue =

1955 film by André Haguet

- Directed by: André Haguet
- Written by: André Haguet; André Legrand; Jacques de Bénac
- Produced by: André Haguet; André Legrand
- Starring: Jean-Claude Pascal; Lucienne Legrand; Julien Bertheau
- Cinematography: Lucien Joulin
- Edited by: Léonide Azar
- Music by: Louiguy
- Production company: Florida Films
- Distributed by: Jeannic Films
- Release date: 27 December 1955
- Running time: 100 minutes
- Country: France
- Language: French

Lord Rogue (French: Milord l'Arsouille) is a 1955 French historical comedy film directed by André Haguet and starring Jean-Claude Pascal, Lucienne Legrand and Julien Bertheau. It was made at the Billancourt Studios in Paris and shot in Cinemascope and Eastmancolor. The film's sets were designed by the art director Lucien Aguettand.

== Synopsis ==
In Paris in the 1840s, during the reign of Louis Philippe, a young English aristocratic dandy frequents the slums of the capital and is immensely popular with the ordinary people. He attracts female admirers as well as the hostility of many of the elite.

== Cast ==
- Jean-Claude Pascal as Lord Henry de Seymour dit Milord l'Arsouille
- Simone Bach as Chantereine
- Lucienne Legrand as Virginie
- Julien Bertheau as the Duke of Mantes
- Jean Debucourt as Louis Philippe I
- Olivier Hussenot as Edward, Seymour's attendant
- Robert Manuel as Marcouski
- Renaud Mary as Harel
- Pascale Roberts as Anna Risomonti
- Louis Seigner as the painter Geoffroy
- Alain Bouvette as Picard
- Michel Lemoine as Alexandre, a dandy
- Guy Rapp as Evariste Marceau, a shoemaker

== Bibliography ==
- Bessy, Maurice & Chirat, Raymond. Histoire du cinéma français: 1951-1955. Pygmalion, 1989.
- Rège, Philippe. Encyclopedia of French Film Directors, Volume 1. Scarecrow Press, 2009.
