= Roland Quignon =

French art director

- Born: 19 December 1897; Paris, France
- Died: 12 May 1984 (aged 86); Nesles-la-Vallée, Val-d'Oise, France
- Occupations: Art Director, Film Director
- Years active: 1933–1965 (film)

Roland Quignon (1897–1984) was a French art director. He designed the sets for more than fifty films during his career. He also directed four films.

== Selected filmography ==
- His Other Love (1934)
- Bourrasque (1935)
- The Scandalous Couple (1935)
- The Dying Land (1936)
- The House Across the Street (1937)
- Women's Prison (1938)
- Clodoche (1938)
- His Uncle from Normandy (1939)
- Case of Conscience (1939)
- My Aunt the Dictator (1939)
- Midnight Tradition (1939)
- President Haudecoeur (1940)
- Happy Days (1941)
- The Master Valet (1941)
- Patricia (1942)
- The Law of Spring (1942)
- My Last Mistress (1943)
- Mistral (1943)
- Lucrèce (1943)
- The Man Without a Name (1943)
- The Inevitable Monsieur Dubois (1943)
- Pamela (1945)
- The Black Cavalier (1945)
- Night Warning (1946)
- Rendezvous in Paris (1947)
- Cab Number 13 (1948)
- The Cavalier of Croix-Mort (1948)
- Death Threat (1950)
- Trial at the Vatican (1952)
- It Is Midnight, Doctor Schweitzer (1952)
- At the Order of the Czar (1954)
- The Count of Bragelonne (1954)
- What a Team! (1957)
- Thunder in the Blood (1960)
- Les enquiquineurs (1965)

== Bibliography ==
- Crisp, Colin. French Cinema—A Critical Filmography: Volume 1, 1929-1939. Indiana University Press, 2015.
