= Shop Girls of Paris =

1943 film

- Directed by: André Cayatte
- Screenplay by: André Cayatte; André Legrand; Michel Duran
- Based on: Au Bonheur des Dames by Émile Zola
- Produced by: Alfred Greven
- Starring: Michel Simon; Albert Préjean; Blanchette Brunoy
- Cinematography: Armand Thirard
- Edited by: Gérard Bensdorp
- Music by: Louis Sédrat
- Production companies: Continental Films; Panitalia
- Release date: 1943
- Running time: 88 minutes
- Country: France

Shop Girls of Paris or The Ladies' Delight (French: Au Bonheur des Dames) is a 1943 French historical drama film directed by André Cayatte and starring Michel Simon, Albert Préjean and Blanchette Brunoy. It is an adaptation of the 1883 novel Au Bonheur des Dames by Émile Zola.

The film was made by the German-backed company Continental Films. It was shot at the Billancourt Studios in Paris with location filming taking place at the Bon Marché department store. The film's sets were created by the art director Andrej Andrejew. The costumes were designed by Rosine Delamare

It was the second film adaptation of Zola's Au Bonheur des Dames in a French production, after Au Bonheur des Dames by Julien Duvivier in 1930 (Lupu Pick had directed a German adaptation in 1922).

== Plot ==
M. Baudu, an irascible old man, runs a small fabric shop in 1860s Paris. A large department store, the first of its kind, opens nearby, putting Baudu's business in peril. Things get even more complicated for him when his niece and two nephews, all recently orphaned, leave their small village to go live with him. Denise, his young niece, is hired as a saleswoman at the department store, to Baudu's displeasure. She does well at her job, and begins receiving both professional and romantic interest from the store's owner, the wealthy and charming Octave Mouret.

== Cast ==
- Michel Simon as M. Baudu
- Albert Préjean as Octave Mouret
- Blanchette Brunoy as Denise Baudu
- Suzy Prim as Henriette Desforges
- Juliette Faber as Mademoiselle Vadon
- Huguette Vivier as Clara Prunaire
- Santa Relli as Geneviève Baudu
- Catherine Fonteney as Madame Aurélie
- Jacqueline Gauthier as Pauline Cugnot
- Maximilienne as Madame Cabin
- Marcelle Rexiane as Madame Marly
- Suzet Maïs as Madame de Boves - la kleptomane
- André Reybaz as Jean Baudu
- Jean Tissier as Émile Bourdoncle
- Jean Rigaux as Baugé
- Georges Chamarat as L'inspecteur Jouve
- Pierre Bertin as Gaujon
- René Blancard as Colomban
- Dorette Ardenne as Une vendeuse
- Odette Barencey as Madame Bédoré
- Paul Barge as Un boutiquier
- Jeannette Batti as Une vendeuse
- Jacques Beauvais as Un boutiquier
- Albert Broquin as Le cocher
- Gustave Gallet as Lhomme
- Pierre Labry as Achille Vingard - Le serrurier
- Jacques Latrouite as Pépé Baudu
- Palmyre Levasseur as L'acheteuse de mouchoirs
- Albert Malbert as Le cafetier
- Maurice Marceau as Un employé
- Frédéric Moriss as Le comte de Boves
- Julienne Paroli as Une boutiquière
- Rambauville as Favier
- Roger Vincent as Un boutiquier

== Crew ==
- Director: André Cayatte
- Screenplay: André Cayatte, Michel Duran and André Legrand
- Assistant director: Jean Devaivre
- Cinematography: Armand Thirard
- Set design: André Andrejew
- Editing: Gérard Bensdorp
- Costumes: Rosine Delamare
- Production: Continental Films
- Head of production: Louis Sédrat

== Bibliography ==
- Lanzoni, Rémi Fournier . French Cinema: From Its Beginnings to the Present. A&C Black, 2004.
