= André Valmy =

French actor

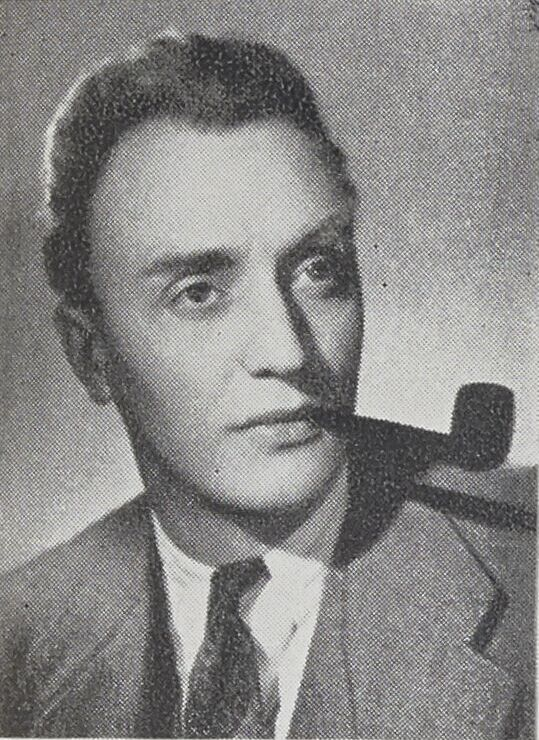
- Born: André Antoine Marius Dugenet; 8 October 1919; Paris, France
- Died: 18 November 2015 (aged 96); Nice, France
- Occupation: Actor
- Years active: 1940-2001

André Valmy (8 October 1919 – 18 November 2015) was a French film actor. He was born André Antoine Marius Dugenet in the 14th arrondissement of Paris. He appeared in more than 60 films between 1940 and 2001. He is also known in France to be the dubbed voice of Walter Matthau, Robert Shaw and George Kennedy.

== Selected filmography ==
- Après Mein Kampf mes crimes (1940) - Ernst
- Mademoiselle Béatrice (1943) - (uncredited)
- I Am with You (1943) - Le gérant de l'hôtel
- L'aventure est au coin de la rue (1944) - Etienne
- Le jugement dernier (1945)
- Dawn Devils (1946) - Serge Duhamel
- Nuit sans fin (1947) - Olivier
- Le beau voyage (1947)
- The Cavalier of Croix-Mort (1948) - Coco-Latour
- Carrefour du crime (1948) - Jacques Marchand
- Une si jolie petite plage (1949) - Georges
- Manon (1949) - Lieutenant Besnard / Bandit Chief
- Marlene (1949) - Laurin
- Mission in Tangier (1949) - Beaudoit
- Les eaux troubles (1949) - Rudan
- Millionaires for One Day (1949) - Marcel
- L'auberge du péché (1949) - Pierre Goulet
- A Man Walks in the City (1950) - Le commissaire
- Shot at Dawn (1950) - Inspecteur Braun
- Under the Sky of Paris (1951) - Le docteur Lucien Evrard
- Rue des Saussaies (1951) - Le commissaire Didier
- The Real Culprit (1951) - Inspecteur Dumont
- The Cape of Hope (1951) - Sem
- The Smugglers' Banquet (1952) - Le douanier Louis
- We Are All Murderers (1952) - P'tit Louis
- Monsieur Taxi (1952) - L'inspecteur principal
- The Respectful Prostitute (1952) - Georges - le patron du club
- It Is Midnight, Doctor Schweitzer (1952) - L'administrateur Leblanc
- Les Compagnes de la nuit (1953) - Inspecteur Maréchal
- Tempest in the Flesh (1954) - Le psychiatre de l'hôpital Ste Anne
- Before the Deluge (1954) - L'autre inspecteur de police
- Quay of Blondes (1954) - Marco
- The Secret of Helene Marimon (1954) - Thierry
- One Bullet Is Enough (1954) - Stauner
- Black Dossier (1955) - Inspecteur Carlier
- Madelon (1955) - Le capitaine Van Meulen
- If All the Guys in the World (1956) - Le capitaine Pierre Le Guellec
- I'll Get Back to Kandara (1956) - Rudeau
- OSS 117 Is Not Dead (1957) - Joseph Sliven
- Maigret Sets a Trap (1958) - L' inspecteur Lucas
- Incognito (1958) - L'inspecteur Laroche
- The Mask of the Gorilla (1958) - Mauricet
- Ça n'arrive qu'aux vivants (1959)
- Minute papillon (1959) - L'inspecteur Grégoire
- Le Saint mène la danse (1960) - Le policier
- La parole est au témoin (1963) - (voice)
- Coplan Takes Risks (1964) - Pelletier
- Nick Carter va tout casser (1964) - Inspecteur Daumale
- The Sleeping Car Murders (1965) - Un inspecteur
- Tintin and the Temple of the Sun (1969) - Bergamotte (voice)
- The Glorious Musketeers (1974) - Rochefort (voice)
