= Trial at the Vatican =

1952 film

- Directed by: André Haguet
- Written by: André Haguet; André Legrand
- Produced by: Fernand Rivers; Paul de Saint-André
- Starring: Jean Debucourt; Suzanne Flon; Catherine Fonteney
- Cinematography: Lucien Joulin
- Edited by: Charlotte Guilbert
- Music by: Maurice-Paul Guillot
- Production company: Les Films Fernand Rivers
- Distributed by: Les Films Fernand Rivers
- Release date: 29 August 1952
- Running time: 115 minutes
- Country: France
- Language: French

Trial at the Vatican (French: Procès au Vatican) is a 1952 French biographical drama film directed by André Haguet and starring France Descaut, Jean Debucourt, Suzanne Flon and Catherine Fonteney. The film is inspired by the life of the saint Thérèse of Lisieux. It was shot at the Billancourt Studios in Paris. The film's sets were designed by the art director Roland Quignon. It is also known by the alternative title The Miracle of Saint Therese.

== Cast ==
- France Descaut as Thérése Martin, en religion Soeur Thérèse de l'Enfant Jésus
- Jean Debucourt as Monsieur Martin
- Suzanne Flon as Mère Agnès de Jésus
- Catherine Fonteney as Mère Geneviève
- Jean Yonnel as L'Abbé Faure - l'aumonier des prisons
- Valentine Tessier as Mère Marie de Gonzague
- Marcelle Géniat as Soeur Saint-Pierre
- Denis d'Inès as L'évêque de Bayeux
- Jean Meyer as L'abbé Deltroëtte
- Albert Dinan as Pranzini
- Magali Vendeuil as Céline
- Guy Kerner as L'appariteur
- Charles Lemontier as Le docteur
- Marie-France as Thérèse Martin enfant

== Bibliography ==
- Bessy, Maurice & Chirat, Raymond. Histoire du cinéma français: 1951-1955. Pygmalion, 1989.
- Rège, Philippe. Encyclopedia of French Film Directors, Volume 1. Scarecrow Press, 2009.
