= After You Duchess =

1954 film directed by Robert de Nesle

- Directed by: Robert de Nesle
- Written by: Robert de Nesle
- Produced by: Robert de Nesle
- Starring: Jean Parédès; Jacqueline Pierreux; Jacques Morel
- Cinematography: André Germain
- Edited by: Monique Isnardon; Robert Isnardon
- Music by: Jerry Mengo
- Production company: Comptoir Français du Film
- Distributed by: Comptoir Français du Film
- Release date: 21 May 1954
- Running time: 81 minutes
- Country: France
- Language: French

After You Duchess (French: Après vous, duchesse) is a 1954 French comedy film directed by Robert de Nesle and starring Jean Parédès, Jacqueline Pierreux and Jacques Morel. The film's art direction was by Raymond Nègre.

== Synopsis ==
When she married her snobbish lawyer husband a woman hid her family's modest background from him. Her father, who is in fact a plumber dresses up as a duchess in order to fool him.

== Cast ==
- Jean Parédès as Jeff
- Jacqueline Pierreux as Suzy
- Jacques Morel as Armand
- Luce Aubertin
- Madeleine Barbulée
- Charles Bayard
- Jean-Marie Bon
- Alain Bouvette
- Serge Bérat
- Marcel Charvey
- Marius Clémenceau
- Grégoire Gromoff
- Olivier Hussenot
- Agnès Laury
- Anne-Marie Mersen
- Annie Noël
- Catherine Romane
- Annie Roudier
- Linda Sereno
- Daniel Sorano

== Bibliography ==
- Philippe Rège. Encyclopedia of French Film Directors, Volume 1. Scarecrow Press, 2009.
