= Nick Carter va tout casser =

1965 French film

- Directed by: Henri Decoin
- Written by: Jean Marcillac (adaptation); André Haguet (adaptation); André Legrand (as H. André Legrand) (adaptation); André Haguet (dialogue)
- Screenplay by: Jean Marcillac (original scenario)
- Produced by: André Michelin; H. André Legrand
- Starring: Eddie Constantine
- Cinematography: Lucien Joulin; Henri Persin
- Edited by: Charles Bretoneiche
- Music by: Pierick Houdy
- Color process: Black and white
- Production companies: Chaumiane; Filmstudio; Florida Films
- Distributed by: Les Films Fernand Rivers; Indipendenti Regionali
- Release date: 17 June 1964
- Running time: 95 minutes
- Countries: France; Italy
- Language: French

Nick Carter va tout casser is a 1964 French spy action film starring Eddie Constantine as Nick Carter. An English version was dubbed by Eddie Constantine dubbing himself. Constantine repeated his role in Nick Carter et le trèfle rouge (1965). The film was titled License to Kill in the United States.

== Plot ==
Professor Fromentin's inventions are about to start a new era in anti-aircraft warfare. No fighter aircraft hitherto known stands a chance against his trail-blazing self-designed unmanned aerial vehicles. Secret services all over the world are determined to either obtain Fromentin's knowledge or to make dead sure nobody else does. But Fromentin refuses to sell and consequently several attempts are made on his life.

Nick Carter has a personal interest in protecting the professor who was a good friend of his father. This is harder than it looks because the professor's entourage includes at least one traitor.

An international network of terrorists eventually conceives a plan to take advantage of this situation. They intend to capture the professor and then to sell him to the highest bidder. Nick Carter has to apply advanced gadgets and sometimes also just his fists, thus refuting all criminal tactics until the scientist can continue searching in freedom and peace.

== Cast ==
- Eddie Constantine as Nick Carter
- Daphné Dayle as Catherine
- Paul Frankeur as Antonio
- Jean-Paul Moulinot as Didier Formentaire
- Barbara Sommers as Gladys (as Barbara Somers)
- Yvonne Monlaur as Yvonne
- Margo Lion as Marie-Jeanne
- Valéry Inkijinoff as Li-Hang (as Inkijinoff)
- Mitsouko L'assistante de Li-Hang
- Maurice Rousselin as Colibri
- Antoine Baud as Un homme de main de Li-Hang
- André Cagnard as Un homme de main de Li-Hang
- Yvan Chiffre as Un homme de main de Li-Hang
- Jean-Pierre Janic as Un homme de main de Li-Hang
- André Valmy as Inspecteur Daumale
- Charles Belmont as Bruno

== Reception ==
David Deal states in the "Eurospy Guide" that this film emulated the US-American Nick Carter movies "of the 1930s and 1940s" and subsequently he recommends it to nostalgist with a penchant for "serials of pulp magazines" of that era.

== Bibliography ==
- Blake, Matt; Deal, David (2004). The Eurospy Guide. Baltimore: Luminary Press. ISBN 1-887664-52-1.

== See also ==
- List of French films of 1964
