= Michel Barbey =

French actor (1927–2026)

- Born: 23 April 1927; Drucourt, Eure, France
- Died: 24 January 2026 (aged 98)
- Occupation: Actor
- Years active: 1944–2016

Michel Barbey (23 April 1927 – 24 January 2026) was a French actor known for his comic roles. He starred in the 1950 film Dominique. Barbey died on 24 January 2026, at the age of 98.

== Selected filmography ==
- The Visitor (1946)
- Lawless Roads (1947)
- Rendezvous in July (1949)
- The Wolf (1949)
- Cartouche, King of Paris (1950)
- Three Sailors in a Convent (1950)
- Dominique (1950)
- The Girl with the Whip (1952)
- The Secret of the Mountain Lake (1952)
- Their Last Night (1953)
- The Case of Doctor Laurent (1957)
- La Horse (1970)

== Bibliography ==
- Goble, Alan. The Complete Index to Literary Sources in Film. Walter de Gruyter, 1999.
