= Claudio Brook =

Mexican actor (1927–1995)

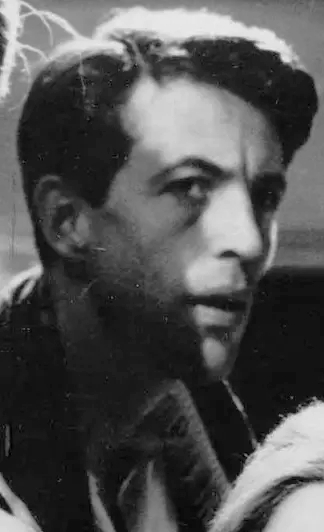
- Claudio Brook in El ángel exterminador (1962)
- Born: Claude Sydney Brook Marnat; 28 August 1927; Mexico City, Mexico
- Died: 18 October 1995 (aged 68); Mexico City, Mexico
- Occupation: Actor
- Spouse: Mercedes Pascual (divorced) Eugenia Avendaño (divorced) Alicia Bonet
- Awards: Ariel Award for Best Actor; 1986 Memoriales perdidos Ariel Award for Best Supporting Actor; 1989 Esperanza

Claude Sydney Brook Marnat (28 August 1927 – 18 October 1995), known as Claudio Brook, was a Mexican actor. Active in film, stage, and television over a career spanning nearly 40-years, he was one of the stars of the Golden Age of Mexican Cinema, and was a noted collaborator of director Luis Buñuel. For his work in motion pictures, Brook received two Ariel Awards, and was inducted into the Paseo de las Luminarias.

== Early life ==
Brook was born Claude Sydney Brook Marnat in Mexico City, to a British father and a Mexican mother of French Basque descent. Raised fluent in Spanish, English, and French, he worked in the British embassy as a clerk while playing semi-pro association football for Atlante F.C.

== Career ==
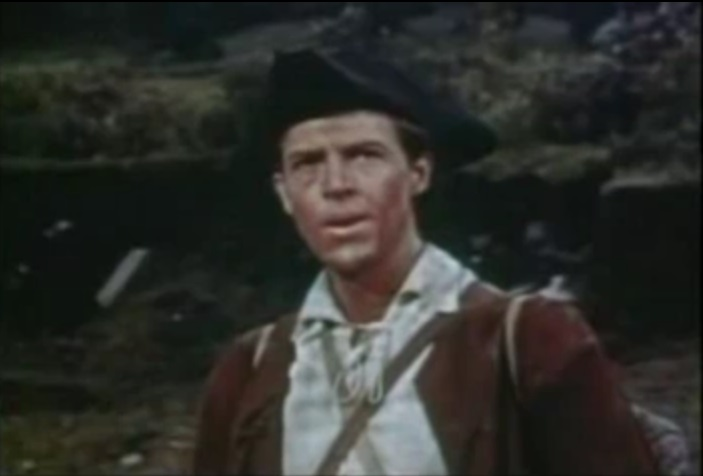
Brook in Daniel Boone, Trail Blazer (1956).

Making his film debut in 1955, Brook appeared in over 100 film and television productions. He also worked in the theatre, playing the lead role in the Mexican premiere of Man of La Mancha in Mexico City in 1969.

One of his most fruitful collaborations was with director Luis Buñuel, appearing in five of the director's films over the course of nine years: The Young One (1960), Viridiana (1961), The Exterminating Angel (1962) Simon of the Desert (1965), and The Milky Way (1969).

He won two Ariel Awards - Best Actor for Memoriales perdidos (1985) and Best Supporting Actor for Esperanza (1988).

Brook also appeared in several international productions; notably as a British RAF pilot in French director Gérard Oury's war comedy La Grande Vadrouille (1966), secret agent Francis Coplan in Coplan Saves His Skin (1968), a banker in the James Bond film Licence to Kill (1989), and Barone in Tony Scott's Revenge (1990).

His distinctive voice and precise elocution found him plenty of voiceover work throughout his career, including dubbing and narration. He was the official Spanish-language spokesperson of Chrysler Motors from 1984 to 1992. He also recorded bumpers and sign-ons for Chilean radio.

One of his final roles was as the villain Dieter de la Guardia in Guillermo del Toro's directorial debut Cronos (1992).

== Personal life ==
Brook was married three times, to Spanish-born Mercedes Pascual; to fellow voice actor Eugenia Avendaño; and finally to Alicia Bonet. He had four children, including actress Simone Brook (born 1969) and Arturo Brook (born 1972), an international tax attorney. His daughter Claudia died of cancer in 1997, and his son Gabriel died in 2004.

=== Death ===
Brook died of stomach cancer on 18 October 1995, at the age of 68. He posthumously starred on the telenovela Retrato de familia, which premiered a week after his death.

== Filmography ==
| Year | Title | Role | Notes |
|---|---|---|---|
| 1956 | Daniel Boone, Trail Blazer | James Boone | |
| 1958 | El Último rebelde | | aka The Last Rebel (USA) |
| 1958 | Los Hijos del divorcio | Fiscal | |
| 1959 | El Derecho a la vida | Cura | |
| 1959 | Vagabundo y millonario | Sr. Procurador | |
| 1959 | Las Señoritas Vivanco | William | |
| 1959 | The Wonderful Country | Ruelle | Uncredited |
| 1960 | El Gran pillo | Hermano de Arturo | |
| 1960 | El Último mexicano | | |
| 1960 | La joven | Rev. Fleetwood | aka The Young One |
| 1960 | Cuando ¡Viva Villa..! es la muerte | Sr. Licenciado | Uncredited |
| 1960 | ¡Yo sabia demasiado! | | |
| 1960 | Neutrón el enmascarado negro | Professor Walker | |
| 1961 | Viridiana | | Uncredited |
| 1961 | Las Cosas prohibidas | | |
| 1961 | Rosa blanca | Mexican consul | |
| 1962 | Geronimo | Mr. Henry | |
| 1962 | The Exterminating Angel | Julio, Mayordomo; Steward | aka El Ángel exterminador |
| 1962 | Los Autómatas de la muerte | Professor Walker | |
| 1963 | Cuando los hijos se pierden | Sr. Carlos de los Rios, padre de Silvia | |
| 1963 | Neutrón contra el Dr. Caronte | Professor Walker | |
| 1963 | Santo en el museo de la cera | Dr. Karol | |
| 1963 | Immediate Delivery | Alex | aka Agente XU 777 and Entrega immediata (Mexico) |
| 1965 | Guadalajara en verano | Professor Fernando Luna | |
| 1965 | The Glory Guys | Rev. Poole | |
| 1965 | Un Hombre peligroso | El 22 | |
| 1965 | Simón del desierto | Simón | aka Simon of the Desert |
| 1965 | Viva Maria! | The Great Rodolfo | |
| 1965 | El dinamitero | | |
| 1966 | Du rififi à Paname | Mike Coppolano | |
| 1966 | La Mano que aprieta | Professor Davenport | |
| 1966 | La Grande Vadrouille | Peter Cunningham | |
| 1967 | Your Turn to Die | Robert Foster | |
| 1967 | The Blonde from Peking | Marc Garland / Gandler | |
| 1968 | Coplan Saves His Skin | Francis Coplan | |
| 1969 | The Milky Way | L'évêque / Bishop | |
| 1969 | House of Pleasure | Baron von Ambras | |
| 1969 | The Scarlet Lady | John Bert | |
| 1971 | Jesús, nuestro Señor | Jesús | |
| 1971 | The Garden of Aunt Isabel | Gonzalo de Medina | |
| 1972 | The Assassination of Trotsky | Roberto | |
| 1972 | Triangulo | Doctor Pedro Millan | |
| 1973 | Jory | Ethan Walden | |
| 1973 | Interval | Armando Vertiz | aka Intervalo (Mexico) |
| 1973 | The Countess Died of Laughter | Baron von Ambras | |
| 1973 | El Castillo de la Pureza | Gabriel Lima | aka Castle of Purity (USA) |
| 1973 | The Mansion of Madness | Dr. Maillard / Raoul Fragonard | |
| 1974 | El Muro del silencio | Señor Olmedo | |
| 1974 | Cinco mil dolares de recompensa | Baker | |
| 1974 | El Santo oficio | Alonso de Peralta | aka The Holy Office |
| 1974 | La Quema de Judas | | |
| 1974 | Algo es algo dijo el diablo | | |
| 1975 | Crónica de un subversivo latinoamericano | Colonel Robert Ernest Whitney | Portrays the real life experience of an American Colonel kidnapped by the FALN guerrilla in Venezuela. aka Chronicle of a Latin American Subversive (International: English title). |
| 1975 | The Devil's Rain | Preacher | |
| 1975 | La Bestia acorralada | Heinrich Werner / Conrad Krauss | |
| 1976 | Foxtrot | Paul | aka The Other Side of Paradise; USA: reissue title |
| 1976 | The Return of a Man Called Horse | Chemin De Fer | as Claudio Brooke |
| 1977 | Alucarda, la hija de las tinieblas | Dr. Oszek/Hunchbacked Gypsy | aka Alucarda (USA: video title) |
| 1977 | El Mar | | |
| 1977 | El Pez que fuma | | aka The Smoking Fish; International: English title |
| 1978 | Flores de papel | Héctor Trejo | aka Paper Flowers; International: English title |
| 1978 | The Bees | Dr. Miller | aka Abejas asesinas (Mexico) |
| 1979 | Matar por matar | | |
| 1979 | Eagle's Wing | Sanchez | |
| 1979 | Only Once in a Lifetime | Jimenez | |
| 1981 | Max Dominio | | |
| 1981 | Pedro Páramo | | |
| 1981 | Complot Petróleo: La cabeza de la hidra | | aka The Oil Conspiracy; International: English title |
| 1983 | Frida, naturaleza viva | Guillermo Kahlo | |
| 1985 | Memoriales perdidos | Padre de Aída | Ariel Award for Best Actor |
| 1985 | Deveras me atrapaste | | |
| 1986 | Murieron a la mitad del rio | Mr. Robinson | |
| 1986 | La Vida de nuestro señor Jesucristo | Jesucristo (Jesus Christ) | aka The Life of Jesus Christ USA |
| 1988 | Esperanza | Dr. Greene | Ariel Award for Best Actor in a Minor Role |
| 1989 | Licence to Kill | Montelongo | |
| 1989 | Romero | Bishop Flores | |
| 1990 | Revenge | Barone | |
| 1992 | Death and the Compass | TV Announcer | |
| 1993 | Fray Bartolomé de las Casas | | aka La Leyenda negra (Mexico) |
| 1993 | Miroslava | Alex Fimman | |
| 1993 | Cronos | De la Guardia | |
| 1993 | Se equivoco la cigueña | | |
| 1995 | Perdóname todo | | |
| 1995 | Una Papa sin catsup | | |

== Awards and nominations ==
| Award | Year | Category | Work | Result |
|---|---|---|---|---|
| Ariel Award | 1986 | Best Actor | Memoriales perdidos | Won |
| Ariel Award | 1989 | Best Actor in a Minor Role | Esperanza | Nominated |
| Premios TVyNovelas | 1985 | Best Villain Actor | La pasión de Isabela | Nominated |
| Premios TVyNovelas | 1987 | Best Villain Actor | El camino secreto | Nominated |
