= Yves Brainville =

French actor (1914–1993)

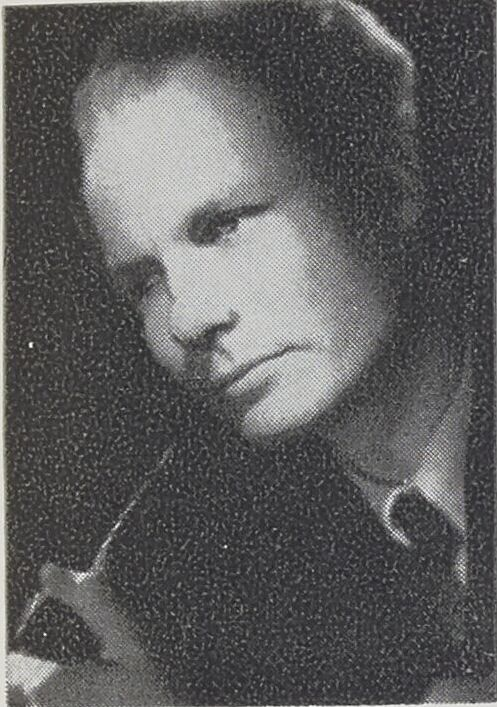
- Born: 8 March 1914; Paris, France
- Died: 16 November 1993 (aged 79); Paris, France
- Occupation: Actor
- Years active: 1938-1991 (film & TV)

Yves Brainville (French pronunciation: [iv bʁɛ̃vil]; 8 March 1914 – 16 November 1993) was a French film and television actor.

== Selected filmography ==
- Entrée des artistes (1938) - Sylvestre
- Final Accord (1938) - Chenal - l'ami de Georges
- Entente cordiale (1939) - Un journaliste
- Le monde en armes (1939)
- Musicians of the Sky (1940) - (uncredited)
- Special Mission (1946) - Le gestionnaire
- La Maison sous la mer (1947) - Un mineur (uncredited)
- Vertigo (1947) - Un assistant
- Judicial Error (1948) - Jacques Heurteaux
- The Wolf (1949) - Le docteur Maillet
- Cartouche, King of Paris (1950) - Le comte de Horn
- The Seven Deadly Sins (1952) - Le commandant (segment "Orgueil, L' / Pride") (uncredited)
- The Slave (1953) - Dr. Vienne
- Act of Love (1953) - (uncredited)
- Hungarian Rhapsody (1954) - Dingelstedt
- At the Order of the Czar (1954) - d'Ingelstedt
- The Big Flag (1954) - Un lieutenant
- A Double Life (1954) - Garreau
- Le Couteau sous la gorge (1955) - Inspecteur Aubier
- If All the Guys in the World (1956) - Le docteur Jégou
- Marie Antoinette Queen of France (1956) - Danton
- The Man Who Knew Too Much (1956) - Police Inspector
- Le Long des trottoirs (1956) - Le commissaire Martin
- Les Aventures de Till L'Espiègle (1956) - Berlemont
- The Mountain (1956) - Andre
- The Crucible (1957) - John Hale
- Le Grand Bluff (1957) - L'ingénieur Watrin
- Paris Holiday (1958) - Inspector Dupont
- A Tale of Two Cities (1958) - Foulon (uncredited)
- Every Day Has Its Secret (1958) - Le juge d'instruction
- Rapt au Deuxième Bureau (1958)
- Bal de nuit (1959) - Le perè de Martine
- Ce soir on tue (1959) - Interpol Man #1
- Monsieur Suzuki (1960)
- Crack in the Mirror (1960) - Prosecutor
- Trapped by Fear (1960) - le commissaire de police
- Le Crime ne paie pas (1962) - Le juge (segment "L'affaire Hugues")
- Five Miles to Midnight (1962) - Monsieur Dompier
- Heaven on One's Head (1965) - Bricourt
- Soleil noir (1966)
- Judoka-Secret Agent (1966) - Paul Vincent, le boss à l'oeil de verre
- The Night of the Generals (1967) - Liesowski
- Asterix the Gaul (1967) - Tonabrix (English version, voice, uncredited)
- Da Berlino l'apocalisse (1967)
- Asterix and Cleopatra (1968) - Vitalstatistix (English version, voice)
- Bye bye, Barbara (1969) - Le commissaire
- Taste of Excitement (1969) - Hotel Proprietor
- Le clan des siciliens (1969) - Le juge
- Mont-Dragon (1970) - (voice)
- Love Me Strangely (1971) - Le commissaire Dedru
- Stavisky (1974) - M. de la Salle
- Q (1974) - Le président de la république
- Impossible... pas français (1974)
- Love and Death (1975) - Andre
- Blondy (1976) - Un diplomate
- International Prostitution: Brigade criminelle (1980)
- The Lady Banker (1980) - Prefaille
- The Bunker (1980) - Gen. Hans Guderian
- Chanel Solitaire (1981) - (uncredited)
- Les Maîtres du temps (1982) - Général (voice)
- Sweet Revenge (1990) - Chase

== Bibliography ==
- Hayward, Susan. Simone Signoret: The Star as Cultural Sign. Continuum, 2004.
