= Jacques François =

French actor (1920–2003)

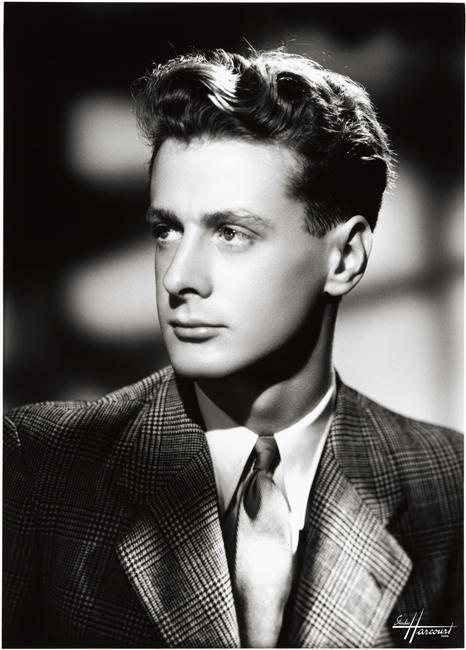
Jacques François Harcourt in 1941

Henri Jacques Daniel Paul François (French pronunciation: [ɑ̃ʁi ʒak danjɛl pɔl fʁɑ̃swa]; 16 May 1920 – 25 November 2003), known as Jacques François was a French actor. During a sixty-year career (1942–2002) he appeared in more than 120 films and over 30 stage productions.

== Biography ==
During World War II, he served as a captain in the French First Army under General de Lattre.

In 1948 he went to Hollywood with a view to playing the lead in Letter from an Unknown Woman (Max Ophüls, 1948) but the part went to Louis Jourdan. After appearing alongside Fred Astaire and Ginger Rogers as the playwright Jacques Pierre Barredout in The Barkleys of Broadway (1949) he returned to France.

François regularly dubbed Gregory Peck into French.François was the French dubbing voice of Gregory Peck in several of his films.

== Filmography ==
Film
Year	Title	Role	Notes
1942	Les affaires sont les affaires		
1943	Captain Fracasse	Vidalenc	
1946	The Queen's Necklace	Le comte d'Artois	Uncredited
1948	Une grande fille toute simple	Mick	
1949	The Barkleys of Broadway	Jacques Pierre Barredout	
1950	Pact with the Devil	Andrea Mola	
1951	Skipper Next to God	Le docteur	
1951	Edward and Caroline	Alain Beauchamp	
1951	Encore	Pierre, French Steward	(segment "Winter Cruise")
1952	Three Women	Horace	(segment "Mouche")
1953	South of Algiers	Jacques Farnod	
1953	My Childish Father	Gérard Morrison	
1953	The Father of the Girl	Michel Leclair	
1953	The Three Musketeers	Aramis	
1954	Royal Affairs in Versailles	Saint-Simon	Uncredited
1954	At the Order of the Czar	Franz Liszt	
1955	To Paris with Love	Victor de Colville	
1955	The Grand Maneuver	Rodolphe	
1970	Le Clair de Terre	Elstir, l'éditeur	
1972	Églantine	Edmond	
1972	Tout le monde il est beau, tout le monde il est gentil	Plantier	
1972	Plot	Lestienne - le chef des services secrets français	
1973	Moi y'en a vouloir des sous	Delfau	
1973	Décembre	Serge de la Prévoteraie	
1973	The Day of the Jackal	Pascal	
1973	The Mad Adventures of Rabbi Jacob	Le général	
1974	Antoine and Sebastian	Le capitaine	
1974	Chinese in Paris	Hervé Sainfons de Montaubert	
1975	Section spéciale	Maurice Gabolde, le procureur de l'État français	
1975	Le Chat et la souris	Le préfet de police	
1976	Chi dice donna dice donna	Charles	(segment "Donne d'affari")
1976	The Toy	Blénac	
1977	Sorcerer	Lefevre	
1978	La Zizanie	Le préfet	
1978	One, Two, Two	Le député Bouillaud-Crevel	
1978	Je suis timide mais je me soigne	Mr. Henri	
1979	Confidences pour confidences	Delorme	
1979	The Gendarme and the Extra-Terrestrials	Le colonel de gendarmerie	
1979	Seven Days in January	Don Thomas	
1979	Je te tiens, tu me tiens par la barbichette	Aurélien Brucheloir	
1979	Cause toujours... tu m'intéresses !	Daniel Granier	
1979	Rien ne va plus	Professeur Casternon	
1980	Julien Fontanes, magistrat	Quinzac	TV series
1981	Celles qu'on n'a pas eues	Le voyageur élégant	
1981	On n'est pas des anges... elles non plus	Jacques Loriol	
1981	San-Antonio ne pense qu'à ça	Le vieux	
1981	Tais-toi quand tu parles	Diafoirus	
1982	A Thousand Billion Dollars	Fred Great	
1982	Tête à claques	M. Crispin-Vautier	
1982	Le Cadeau	Jacques Loriol	
1982	Le Père Noël est une ordure	Le pharmacien	
1982	The Troops & Troop-ettes	Le colonel	
1982	Toutes griffes dehors	Alain	TV mini-series
1983	L'Africain	Le docteur Patterson	
1983	Man, Woman and Child	Louis	
1983	Papy fait de la résistance	Jacques de Frémontel	
1984	Les parents ne sont pas simples cette année	John, l'acheteur d'art	
1984	The Blood of Others	Colonel Catelas	
1984	Until September	M. Mauriac	
1984	La tête dans le sac	Doctor Choulet	
1985	Liberté, Égalité, Choucroute	Necker	
1986	Sauve-toi, Lola	Charles Schneider	
1986	Twist again à Moscou	Maréchal Bassounov	
1987	La Vie dissolue de Gérard Floque	L'avocat	
1987	La rusa		
1989	My Best Pals	M. Thillet	
1989	L'invité surprise	Le directeur de la P.J.	
1991	L'Opération Corned-Beef	General Masse of the Directorate-General for External Security	
1991	Triplex	Le père de Nathalie	
1991	Robinson et compagnie	Robinson	Voice
1992	Le fils du Mékong	Dupré	
1992	My Wife's Girlfriends	Gilbert Thonon	
1996	North Star	Colonel Henry Johnson	
1996	My Man	2nd Client	
1998	The Visitors II: The Corridors of Time	Le mari de Gisèle	
1999	Recto/verso	Bergman	
2000	Les Acteurs	Himself	
2000	Le Roi danse	Cambefort	
2001	Fifi Martingale	L'ambassadeur	
2004	Je suis votre homme	M. de la Touche	(final film role)
