= Léone Nogarède =

French actress (1926–2026)

- Born: 10 February 1926; Beuvry, France
- Died: 4 November 2026 (aged 100); Paris, France
- Education: National School of Arts and Techniques of Theatre
- Occupation: Actress

Léone Nogarède (French: [leˈɔn noɡaʁˈɛd]; 10 February 1926 – 4 November 2026) was a French actress.

A graduate of the National School of Arts and Techniques of Theatre, she appeared at the Festival d'Avignon in 1947 in a production of William Shakespeare's Richard II. Portraying Isabella of Valois, she reprised her role in 1948 and 1949. Alongside acting, she worked in art critique, contributing to publications such as Plaisir de France, Connaissance des Arts, and Les Nouvelles littéraires. She was international secretary of the French chapter of the International Association of Art Critics from 1988 to 1993. She returned to Avignon in 2010 for a production of Une Semaine d'Art en Avignon, directed by her granddaughter, Olivia Grandville.

Nogarède died in Paris on 4 November 2026, at the age of 100.

== Filmography ==
- Le Destin exécrable de Guillemette Babin (1948)
- Cartouche, King of Paris (1950)
