= The Wheel (1957 film) =

1957 film

- Directed by: Maurice Delbez; André Haguet
- Written by: Oscar Paul Gilbert
- Produced by: André Haguet; André Legrand
- Starring: Jean Servais; Pierre Mondy; Catherine Anouilh
- Cinematography: Lucien Joulin; Pierre Petit
- Edited by: Léonide Azar; Suzanne Rondeau
- Music by: Louiguy
- Production company: Florida Films
- Distributed by: Jeannic Films
- Release date: 3 July 1957
- Running time: 103 minutes
- Country: France
- Language: French

The Wheel (French: La Roue) is a 1957 French drama film directed by Maurice Delbez and André Haguet and starring Jean Servais, Pierre Mondy and Catherine Anouilh. The film's sets were designed by the art director Lucien Aguettand. It is a remake of the 1923 film of the same title directed by Abel Gance.

== Cast ==
- Jean Servais as Pierre Pelletier
- Pierre Mondy as Jean Marcereau
- Catherine Anouilh as Norma Johnson / Marie Johnson
- Claude Laydu as Roland Pelletier
- François Guérin as Jacques Marchand
- Julien Bertheau as Périer
- Georges Chamarat as L'ophtalmologiste
- Carmen Duparc as Marie
- Yvette Etiévant as Marcelle
- Georges Jamin as Le chef de poste
- Paul Mercey as Pujol
- Paul Peri as Blin
- Émile Riandreys as Un cheminot
- Louis Viret as Le chef de gare

== Bibliography ==
- Rège, Philippe. Encyclopedia of French Film Directors, Volume 1. Scarecrow Press, 2009.
