= Kay Weniger =

Austrian writer of books on media issues (born 1966)

- Born: 1956 (age 69–70); Berlin, Germany
- Education: Hamburg University
- Occupations: Writer
- Parent(s): Sigrid Roth, Hans Weniger

Kay Weniger (born 1956) is an Austrian writer of books on media issues. He published an eight-volume encyclopaedia on international film people.

== Biography ==
Weniger is the son of the German stage and film actress Sigrid Roth and the Austrian stage actor Hans Weniger. They left Berlin for Hamburg when he was one year old. Weniger studied the history of art, history and archaeology at the Hamburg University, and gained his doctorate with a thesis titled Wiederaufbau- und Neubauplanung in Hamburg 1945 bis 1950. Städtebauliche Kontinuität oder Wandel?.

== Career ==
Weniger has worked as an editor for several German newspapers, including Die Welt in Bonn and Welt am Sonntag in Hamburg. Initially a specialist in travel, he soon focused on media issues and wrote a huge number of articles on film and film people.

In 2001 he published the eight-volume encyclopaedia "Das grosse Personenlexikon des Films". It contains more than 6100 biographies of all kinds of men and women active in the international film business.

In 2008 he published another reference book, "Zwischen Bühne und Baracke". It contains some 500 biographies on people in theatre, film and the music business who suffered under National Socialist persecution and terror in Europe between 1933 and 1945.

== Works ==
- Das große Personenlexikon des Films. Die Schauspieler, Regisseure, Kameraleute, Produzenten, Komponisten, Drehbuchautoren, Filmarchitekten, Ausstatter, Kostümbildner, Cutter, Tontechniker, Maskenbildner und Special Effects Designer des 20. Jahrhunderts. 8 Bände. Schwarzkopf und Schwarzkopf, Berlin 2001, ISBN 3-89602-340-3.
- Zwischen Bühne und Baracke. Lexikon der verfolgten Theater-, Film- und Musikkünstler 1933 bis 1945. Mit einem Geleitwort von Paul Spiegel. Metropol, Berlin 2008, ISBN 978-3-938690-10-9.
- 'Es wird im Leben dir mehr genommen als gegeben ...' Lexikon der aus Deutschland und Osterreich emigrierten Filmschaffenden 1933 bis 1945: Eine Gesamtübersicht ['In life, more will be taken from you than given ...' Dictionary of German and Austrian Emigrant Filmmakers 1933-1945: A Complete Overview] (in German). ACABUS Verlag. 2011. pp. 226–227. ISBN 9783862820498. OCLC 778861913.
