= Guillaume Radot =

- Born: 13 August 1911; Paris, France
- Died: 5 November 1977 (aged 66); Garches, Hauts-de-Seine, France
- Other name: Guillaume Simon Charles Radot
- Occupations: Director, Producer, Writer
- Years active: 1940-1957 (film)

Guillaume Radot (1911–1977) was a French screenwriter, producer and film director.

== Selected filmography ==
- The Wolf of the Malveneurs (1943)
- Lawless Roads (1947)
- The Wolf (1949)
- Cartouche, King of Paris (1950)

== Bibliography ==
- Klossner, Michael. The Europe of 1500-1815 on Film and Television: A Worldwide Filmography of Over 2550 Works, 1895 Through 2000. McFarland & Company, 2002.
