= Cartouche, King of Paris =

1950 film

- Directed by: Guillaume Radot
- Written by: Pierre Lestringuez; Léopold Marchand
- Produced by: Guillaume Radot
- Starring: Roger Pigaut; Renée Devillers; Claire Duhamel
- Cinematography: Paul Cotteret
- Edited by: Pierre Caillet
- Music by: Maurice Thiriet
- Production company: Midi-Ciné-Location
- Release date: 2 August 1950
- Running time: 80 minutes
- Country: France

Cartouche, King of Paris or just Cartouche (French: Cartouche, roi de Paris) is a 1950 French historical adventure film directed by Guillaume Radot and starring Roger Pigaut, Renée Devillers and Claire Duhamel. The film's sets were designed by the art director Marcel Magniez. It portrays the eighteenth century highwaymen Louis Dominique Bourguignon, known as Cartouche.

== Cast ==
- Roger Pigaut as Louis Dominique Bourguignon dit Cartouche
- Renée Devillers as Madame de Parabère
- Claire Duhamel as Henriette
- Jean Davy as Le régent Philippe d'Orléans
- Jacques Castelot as Le duc du Maine
- Jacky Flynt as Vénus, la bohémienne
- Léone Nogarède as La duchesse du Maine
- Lucien Nat as M. de Cellamare
- Pierre Bertin as Monsieur de Boisgreux
- Pierre Stéphen as Lignières
- Denis d'Inès as Le fermier général
- Jean Carmet as Brin d'Amour, un soldat
- Palau as Anselme Bourguignon
- René Worms as Le cardinal Dubois
- Léon Bary as Un officier de cour
- Sinoël as Le vieux
- Lucien Blondeau as Le majordome
- Yves Brainville as Le comte de Horn
- Marcel Pérès as Le recruteur
- Albert Michel as L'espion
- Albert Malbert as Le policier
- Frédéric Mariotti as Un voleur
- Jean Clarieux as Un voleur
- Maurice Régamey as Lafleur, un voleur
- Jo Dervo as Un voleur
- Georges Patrix as Un voleur
- Michel Barbey as Simon
- Alfred Baillou
- Georges Cahuzac
- Jacques Cossin
- Harry-Max
- Jean-Pierre Lorrain
- Lévy as Un juif
- Franck Maurice
- Émile Mylo
- Raymond Pélissier
- Liliane Robert
- Marcel Rouzé

== See also ==
- Cartouche (1962)

== Bibliography ==
- Klossner, Michael. The Europe of 1500-1815 on Film and Television: A Worldwide Filmography of Over 2550 Works, 1895 Through 2000. McFarland & Company, 2002.
