= Hungarian Rhapsody (1954 film) =

1954 film

- Directed by: Peter Berneis; André Haguet
- Written by: André Legrand; André Haguet
- Produced by: Georges Bernier; Anton Schelkopf
- Starring: Colette Marchand; Paul Hubschmid; Michel Simon
- Cinematography: Nicolas Hayer
- Edited by: Borys Lewin; Anneliese Schönnenbeck
- Music by: Jacques Bazire
- Production companies: Florida Films; Oska-Film
- Release date: 15 April 1954
- Running time: 95 minutes
- Countries: France; West Germany
- Language: German

Hungarian Rhapsody (German: Ungarische Rhapsodie) is a 1954 French-German historical musical film directed by Peter Berneis and André Haguet and starring Colette Marchand, Paul Hubschmid and Michel Simon. Shooting took place at the Victorine Studios in Nice and on location in Paris and the French Riviera. A separate French-language version At the Order of the Czar was also made.

== Cast ==
- Colette Marchand as Carolyne zu Sayn-Wittgenstein
- Paul Hubschmid as Franz Liszt
- Michel Simon as General von Sayn-Wittgenstein
- Willy Fritsch as Großherzog
- Peter Lehmbrock as Richard Wagner
- Margot Leonard as Wanda
- Yves Brainville as Dingelstedt
- Jacqueline Gay as Nathalie
- Lucienne Legrand as Maria Pawlowna

== Bibliography ==
- Bock, Hans-Michael & Bergfelder, Tim. The Concise CineGraph. Encyclopedia of German Cinema. Berghahn Books, 2009.
