= The Count of Bragelonne =

1954 film

- Directed by: Fernando Cerchio
- Written by: Alexandre Astruc; Roland Laudenbach
- Based on: The Vicomte of Bragelonne by Alexandre Dumas
- Produced by: Robert de Nesle; Dario Sabatello
- Starring: Georges Marchal; Dawn Addams; Jacques Dumesnil
- Cinematography: Lucien Joulin
- Edited by: Léonide Azar
- Music by: René Sylviano
- Production companies: Comptoir Français de Productions Cinématographiques; Orso Film; Iris Film
- Distributed by: Comptoir Français du Film
- Release date: 9 December 1954
- Running time: 95 minutes
- Countries: France; Italy
- Language: French

The Count of Bragelonne (French: Le Vicomte de Bragelonne, Italian: Il Visconte di Bragelonne) is a 1954 Franco-Italian film directed by Fernando Cerchio. It is a film adaptation of the novel Le Vicomte de Bragelonne by Alexandre Dumas père. Its cast included Dawn Addams, Georges Marchal and Jacques Dumesnil. It was shot at the Billancourt Studios in Paris. The film's sets were designed by the art director Roland Quignon.

== Synopsis ==
Raoul de Bragelonne, son of the musketeer Athos, returns to France from a mission to England to find that his lover Louise de la Vallière is now mistress of Louis XIV. Instead he now falls in love with Hélène de Winter and with the assistance of D'Artagnan foils a plot by Cardinal Mazarin to put the King's secret twin brother on the throne.

== Cast ==
- Georges Marchal as Raoul de Bragelonne
- Dawn Addams as Hélène de Winter
- Jacques Dumesnil as d'Artagnan
- Franco Silva as Boissière
- Florence Arnaud as Louise de la Vallière
- Robert Burnier as Athos
- André Falcon as Louis XIV
- Philippe Olive as Porthos
- Nico Pepe as Mazarin
- Jean Tissier as Planchet
- Nicolas Amato as Le chambellan
- Jean Clarieux as Un paysan
- René Hell as Un paysan
- Robert Le Fort as Un garde
- Gina Manès as Une paysanne

== Bibliography ==
- Klossner, Michael. The Europe of 1500-1815 on Film and Television: A Worldwide Filmography of Over 2550 Works, 1895 Through 2000. McFarland & Company, 2002.
