= Jean Clarieux =

French actor

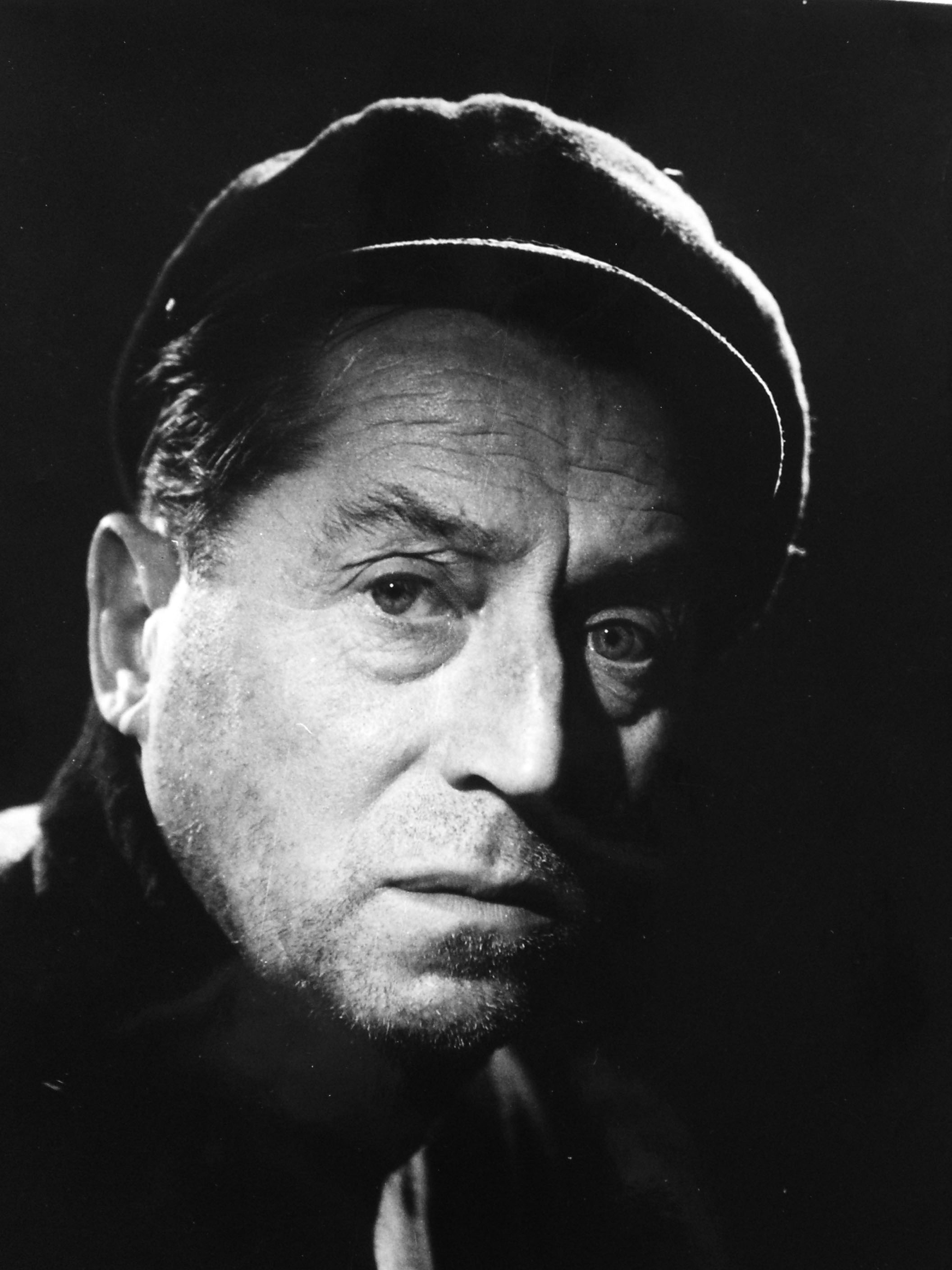
- Clarieux in 1957
- Born: April 3, 1911; La Rochelle, Charente-Inférieure, France
- Died: February 11, 1970 (aged 58); Montmorency, Val-d'Oise, France
- Occupation: Actor
- Years active: 1938–1970

Jean Clarieux (April 3, 1911 – February 11, 1970) was a French film and television actor. Generally a supporting actor appearing in smaller parts, he played a more substantial role in René Clément's 1946 resistance film The Battle of the Rails.

== Biography ==
His tone of voice as Parisian titi is very recognizable in many American films of the 1950s and 1960s where he lends his voice to complementary actors (especially in war films and westerns), but also to Anthony Quinn. He lends his voice to Captain Haddock in a cartoon series on the adventures of Tintin directed by Ray Goossens.

Beyond the dubbing, his filmography is important: he notably plays a railwayman in La Bataille du rail by René Clément, and it is his weathered face that appears on the poster of the film. In Golden Helmet by Jacques Becker, he plays the role of Paul, alongside Raymond Bussières. He also acted for television in the 1960s, notably in the series Les Cinq Dernières Minutes by Claude Loursais and in Les Beaux Yeux d'Agatha by Bernard Hecht.

== Selected filmography ==
- The Postmaster's Daughter (1938)
- Happy Days (1941)
- The Blue Veil (1942)
- The Battle of the Rails (1946)
- Lawless Roads (1947)
- Scandal (1948)
- Maya (1949)
- La Marie du port (1950)
- Three Telegrams (1950)
- La Ronde (1950)
- Cartouche, King of Paris (1950)
- Amédée (1950)
- The Lovers of Bras-Mort (1951)
- Juliette, or Key of Dreams (1951)
- Duel in Dakar (1951)
- Paris Still Sings (1951)
- The Night Is My Kingdom (1951)
- Casque d'Or (1952)
- A Mother's Secret (1952)
- Judgement of God (1952)
- Holiday for Henrietta (1952)
- The Adventurer of Chad (1953)
- Double or Quits (1953)
- The Count of Bragelonne (1954)
- The Lost Girl (1954)
- Paris, Palace Hotel (1956)
- Irresistible Catherine (1957)
- Marie of the Isles (1959)

== Bibliography ==
- Jennifer Lynde Barker. The Aesthetics of Antifascist Film: Radical Projection. Routledge, 2013.
