= Happy Days (1942 film) =

1942 film

- Directed by: Gianni Franciolini
- Written by: Claude-André Puget (play); Arnaldo Fraccaroli
- Produced by: Angelo Mosco; Nicola Naracci
- Starring: Lilia Silvi; Amedeo Nazzari; Leonardo Cortese
- Cinematography: Tino Santoni
- Edited by: Mario Serandrei
- Music by: Felice Montagnini
- Production company: Excelsa Film
- Distributed by: Minerva Film
- Release date: 23 December 1942
- Running time: 83 minutes
- Country: Italy
- Language: Italian

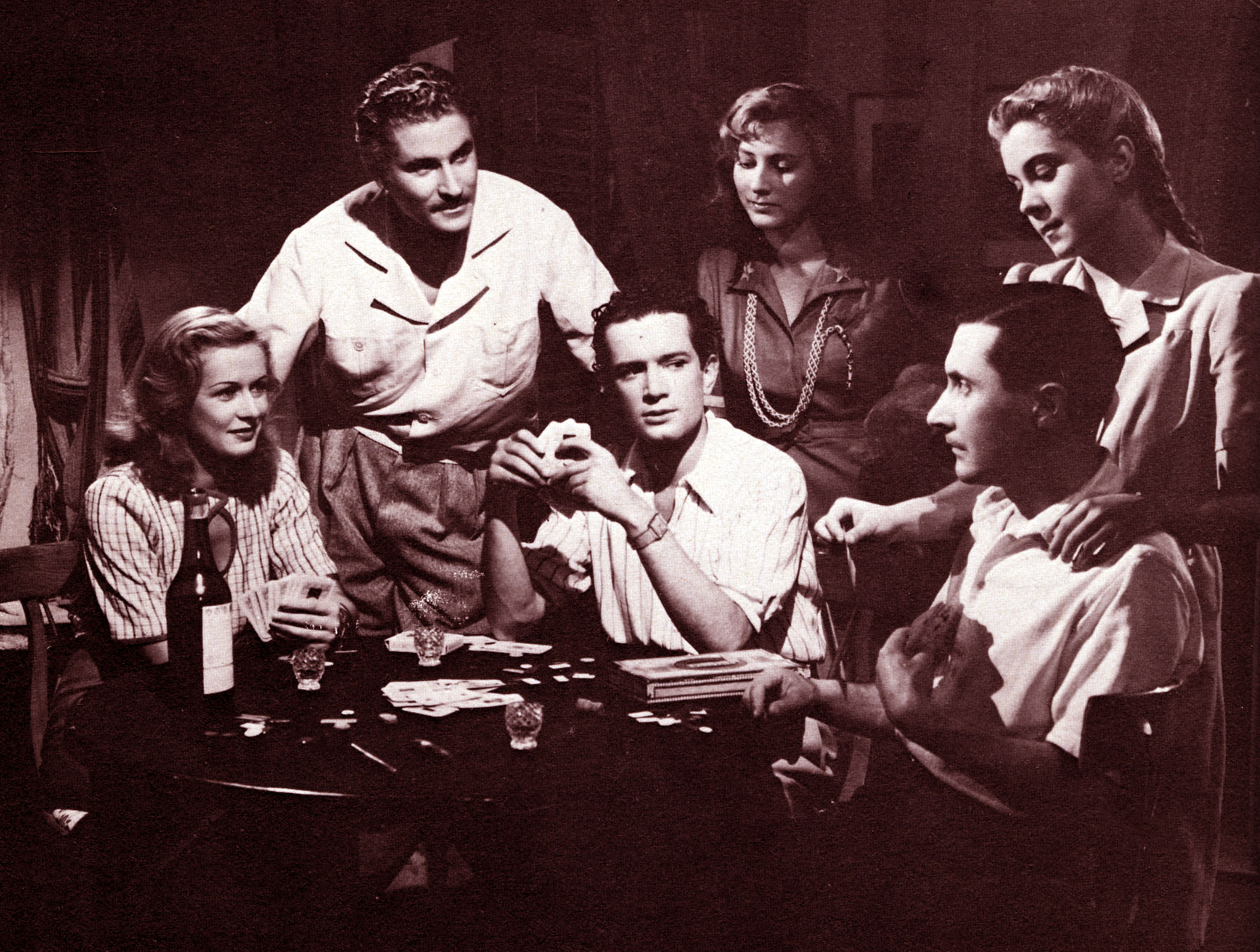
Still from Happy Days

Happy Days (Italian: Giorni felici) is a 1942 Italian "white-telephones" comedy film directed by Gianni Franciolini and starring Lilia Silvi, Amedeo Nazzari and Leonardo Cortese. It was based on a play by Claude-André Puget, which had been made into a French film Les jours heureux the previous year.

It was shot at the Palatino Studios in Rome. The film's sets were designed by the art directors Piero Filippone and Mario Rappini.

== Synopsis ==
Due to engine trouble, an aviator is forced to land and spend the day at a villa while his plane is repaired by mechanics. His arrival provokes both love and jealousy amongst the villa's inhabitants.

== Cast ==
- Lilia Silvi as Franca
- Amedeo Nazzari as Michele
- Leonardo Cortese as Oliviero
- Valentina Cortese as Marianna
- Vera Carmi as Nietta
- Paolo Stoppa as Bernardo
- Silvio Bagolini as Il motorista
- Alfredo Salvatori as Il meccanico

== Bibliography ==
- Ruth Ben-Ghiat. Italian Fascism's Empire Cinema. Indiana University Press, 2015. ISBN 978-0-253-01559-4.
