= At the Order of the Czar =

1954 film

- Directed by: André Haguet
- Written by: André Haguet; André Legrand
- Produced by: Albert Caraco; André Haguet
- Starring: Michel Simon; Colette Marchand; Jacques François
- Cinematography: Nicolas Hayer
- Edited by: Maurice Serein
- Music by: Louiguy
- Production companies: Florida Films; Gamma Film; Oska-Film
- Distributed by: Gamma Film
- Release date: 18 June 1954
- Running time: 98 minutes
- Countries: France; West Germany
- Language: French

At the Order of the Czar (French: Par ordre du tsar) is a 1954 French-West German historical drama film directed by André Haguet and starring Michel Simon, Colette Marchand and Jacques François. A separate German-language version Hungarian Rhapsody was also produced.

Shooting took place at the Victorine Studios in Nice and on location in Paris and the French Riviera. The film's sets were designed by the art director Roland Quignon. It was shot in Gevacolor.

== Cast ==
- Michel Simon as Prince de Sayn-Wittgenstein
- Colette Marchand as Princess Caroline
- Jacques François as Franz Liszt
- Jacqueline Gay as Nathalie
- Willy Fritsch as Le Grand-Duc
- Lucienne Legrand as Maria Paulovna
- Yves Brainville as d'Ingelstedt
- Margot Leonard as Wanda
- Peter Lehmbrock as Richard Wagner

== Bibliography ==
- Mitchell, Charles P. The Great Composers Portrayed on Film, 1913 through 2002. McFarland, 2004.
