= Shot at Dawn (film) =

1950 film

- Directed by: André Haguet
- Written by: André Haguet; André Legrand
- Based on: Shot at Dawn by Maurice Dekobra
- Produced by: Jean De Beaumont; Pierre Médioni; Renée Saint-Cyr
- Starring: Renée Saint-Cyr; Frank Villard; Nathalie Nattier
- Cinematography: Charles Bauer
- Edited by: Gabriel Rongier
- Music by: Marceau Van Hoorebecke
- Production companies: Société Méditerranéenne de Production; Télouet Films
- Distributed by: Les Films Dispa
- Release date: 9 September 1950
- Running time: 90 minutes
- Country: France
- Language: French

Shot at Dawn (French: Fusillé à l'aube) is a 1950 French spy drama film directed by André Haguet and starring Renée Saint-Cyr, Frank Villard and Nathalie Nattier. It was based on the 1937 novel of the same title by Maurice Dekobra. The film's sets were designed by the art directors Jacques Brizzio and Marcel Magniez.

== Synopsis ==
During the First World War, after hearing of her husband's execution at the hands of his superior the Austrian colonel von Pennwitz, Florence enlists in the French secret service to gain revenge. However her attempt to hunt down those responsible for her husband's betrayal leads her to discover that he is in fact still alive. His supposed death was a ruse de guerre. It is only with the Armistice that the couple are happily reunited.

== Cast ==
- Renée Saint-Cyr as Florence Hennings
- Frank Villard as Rudolf Hennings
- Howard Vernon as Le colonel von Pennwitz
- Nathalie Nattier as Marika
- Georges Galley as Le chasseur de chamois
- André Valmy as l'inspecteur Braun
- Olivier Hussenot as Marcel Berthier - l'agent 24
- Annie Marel as Lisbeth
- Jean Lanier as L'attaché militaire von Kellendorf
- Robert Le Béal as Un officier
- Raymond Girard as Le colonel
- Alexandre Mihalesco as L'aubergiste
- Jean Berton as Le régisseur
- Georges Sellier as Le colonel autrichien

== Bibliography ==
- Goble, Alan. The Complete Index to Literary Sources in Film. Walter de Gruyter, 1999.
- Rège, Philippe. Encyclopedia of French Film Directors, Volume 1. Scarecrow Press, 2009.
