= Happy Days (1941 film) =

1941 film

- Directed by: Jean de Marguenat
- Written by: André Legrand
- Based on: Happy Days by Claude-André Puget
- Produced by: Roger Richebé
- Starring: Pierre Richard-Willm; François Périer; Juliette Faber
- Cinematography: Fédote Bourgasoff
- Edited by: Jean Feyte
- Music by: Lionel Cazaux; Jacques Météhen
- Production company: Films Roger Richebé
- Distributed by: Films Roger Richebé
- Release date: 24 December 1941
- Running time: 90 minutes
- Country: France
- Language: French

Happy Days (French: Les jours heureux) is a 1941 French comedy film directed by Jean de Marguenat and starring Pierre Richard-Willm, François Périer and Juliette Faber. It is based on the 1938 play of the same name by Claude-André Puget. It was remade as an Italian film Happy Days the following year. The film's sets were designed by the art director Roland Quignon.

== Synopsis ==
A group of five friends and relatives go to the country for a holiday. Marianne wishes Olivier to be more interested in her. Their romantic entanglements lead only to confusion, until the unexpected arrival of an aviator solves everything.

== Cast ==
- Pierre Richard-Willm as Michel
- François Périer as Bernard
- Juliette Faber as Pernette
- Monique Thibaut as Marianne
- André Bervil as Olivier
- Janine Viénot as Francine
- Jean Clarieux
- Paul Barré
- Léonce Corne

== Bibliography ==
- Rège, Philippe. Encyclopedia of French Film Directors, Volume 1. Scarecrow Press, 2009.
