= André Haguet =

French screenwriter (1900–1973)

André Haguet (French pronunciation: [ɑ̃dʁe aɡɛ]; 9 November 1900 - 20 August 1973) was a French screenwriter and film director.

== Selected filmography ==
- The Weaker Sex (1933)
- The Faceless Voice (1933)
- Mandrin (1947)
- Dark Sunday (1948)
- The Passenger (1949)
- Shot at Dawn (1950)
- It Is Midnight, Doctor Schweitzer (1952)
- Trial at the Vatican (1952)
- At the Order of the Czar (1954)
- Hungarian Rhapsody (1954)
- Lord Rogue (1955)
- The Wheel (1957)
- Thunder in the Blood (1960)
