= Robert Party =

French actor

Robert Party (1924–2011) was a French actor.

== Selected filmography ==
- The New Adventures of Vidocq (1971, TV series)
- Poker d'As (1973, TV series)

== Voice filmography ==
- 1994: Asterix Conquers America as Caesar (French Dub)
