= Harold Kay (actor) =

French actor

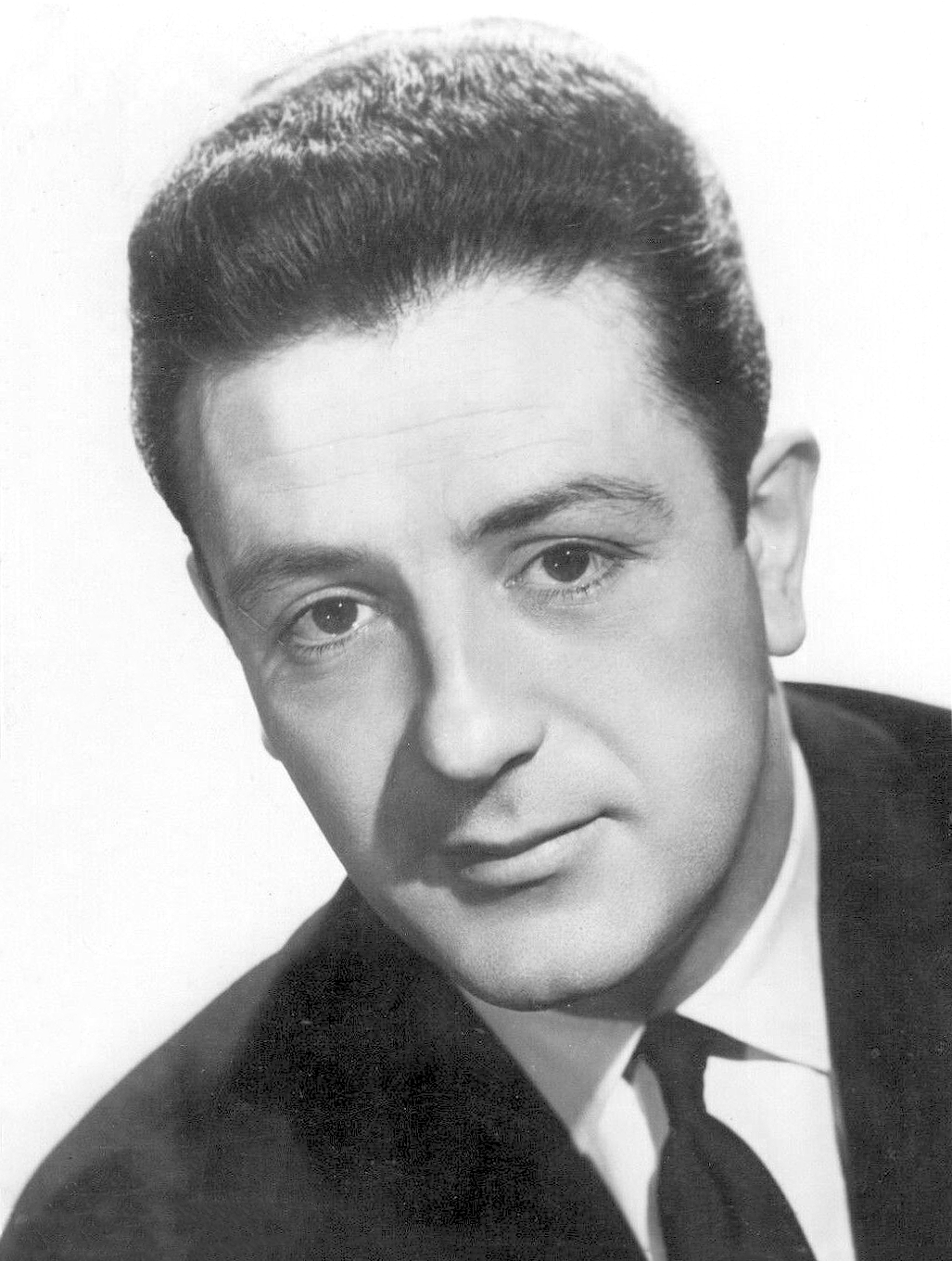
Image of Harold Kay

Harold Kay (1926–1990) was a French actor.

== Selected filmography ==
- The Cat Shows Her Claws (1960)
- Thunder in the Blood (1960)
