= Dominique Paturel =

French actor (1931–2022)

- Born: 3 April 1931; Le Havre, France
- Died: 28 February 2022 (aged 90); Saint-Brieuc, France
- Education: Institut Saint-Joseph
- Alma mater: École de la rue Blanche
- Occupation: Actor
- Years active: 1955–2018

Dominique Paturel (3 April 1931 – 28 February 2022) was a French actor.

== Early life ==
Paturel was born on 3 April 1931 in Le Havre and was educated at the Institution Saint-Joseph. He moved to Paris in 1951, and he graduated from the École de la rue Blanche.

== Career ==
Paturel started his career at the Théâtre National Populaire in the 1950s. He subsequently acted at the Théâtre de l'Odéon. Meanwhile, he acted in films in the 1960s-1980s.

Paturel dubbed J. R. Ewing in Dallas. He also dubbed Terence Hill, Omar Sharif and Anthony Hopkins.

== Personal life ==
Paturel died in Saint-Brieuc on 28 February 2022, at the age of 90.
