= Jeanne Humbert =

French writer (1890–1986)

- Born: 24 January 1890
- Died: 1 August 1986 (aged 96)
- Occupation: Writer
- Notable work: La Grande Reforme

Jeanne Humbert (24 January 1890 – 1 August 1986) was a French feminist writer and activist. Humbert was a neo-malthusian who worked for much of her life to make birth control and abortion legal. Her views about the differences between men and women were seen as controversial by other feminists, but she still fought for women's rights.

== Personal life and career ==
Humbert was born in 1890. Her mother later divorced her bourgeois husband to marry a militant anarchist and as a result, Humbert was often around anarchists ever since she was a child. In 1909, she met Eugene Humbert, who advocated for Neo-Malthusianism. She later married Eugene, who wanted to make birth control and abortion legal, with Humbert helping him with his work. In 1920, a law was passed which made it illegal to discuss contraception and abortion in France, later leading to the frequent arrests of the Humberts for spreading information.

Eugene died in prison in 1944 and Humbert continued his work by writing articles, pamphlets, and books. Two of her books were about her life in prison. She also continued publishing the newspaper La Grande Reforme, which her husband had been the director of from 1931 to 1939. Within two of the articles that she wrote for the newspaper, with the title "Our Equals", Humbert stated ideas that separated herself from other feminists. Within "Our Equals", "she found equality between the sexes to be illusory because she emphasized differences rather than commonalities between men and women". Humbert believed that women are less creative and inventive compared to men. Humbert's term for the differences is "integral humanism". She later wrote a third part to "Our Equals" to state that "conscious maternity must be a basic right of women; that women had the right to the full expansion of brain, heart, and body; that they must become individuals by practicing altruism rather than egotism". Other feminists did not side with Humbert's views, but Humbert's arguments were that she was "one of the first women in France" that supported women's jury rights and that she supported feminine liberation. Despite her controversial views, Humbert fought for sexual liberation, women's rights, and peace.

== See also ==
- First-wave feminism
- Feminism in France
