= Harold Kay (footballer) =

English footballer (1897–1966)

Personal information
- Full name: Harold Kay
- Date of birth: 24 April 1897
- Place of birth: Chapeltown, South Yorkshire, England
- Date of death: 1966 (aged 68–69)
- Position: Wing-half

Senior career*
Years	Team	Apps	(Gls)
1919–1920	Thorncliffe United		
1920–1923	Barnsley	14	(0)
1923–1924	Southend United	11	(1)
1924–1925	Barrow	39	(3)
1925–1928	Crewe Alexandra	119	(24)
1928–1930	Mansfield Town		
1930–1935	Wombwell		
1935	Barnsley Ministry of Labour		
Total		183	(28)
- * Club domestic league appearances and goals

Harold Kay (24 April 1897 – 1966) was an English footballer who played in the Football League for Barnsley, Barrow, Crewe Alexandra and Southend United.
