= Harold Kaye =

English cricketer

Harold Swift Kaye DSO MC (9 May 1882 – 6 November 1953) was an English first-class cricketer, who played eighteen matches for Yorkshire County Cricket Club in 1907 and 1908. He also appeared for in one first-class game for the Marylebone Cricket Club (MCC) in 1908, and two for H. D. G. Leveson Gower's XI in 1909 and 1910. He reappeared for the MCC in a non first-class game in 1922.

Born in Mirfield, Yorkshire, England, Kaye was a right-handed batsman, who scored 262 runs at an average of 9.70, with a best score of 37 for Yorkshire against the MCC in his second match, at Lord's, in 1907. He took nine catches, and bowled one maiden over, for H. D. G. Leveson Gower's XI, without success.

Following service in World War I, Kaye was a lieutenant colonel, DSO, MC. He played for the Yorkshire Gentlemen for many years, and later became a member of the Yorkshire Cricket Committee. He was chairman of Marshall, Kaye and Marshall, a firm of woollen manufacturers based in Ravensthorpe.

Kaye died in November 1953 in St John's, Wakefield, Yorkshire.

His son, Michael Kaye, played seventeen matches for Cambridge University in 1937 and 1938.
