= Massacre in Lace =

1952 film by André Hunebelle

- Directed by: André Hunebelle
- Written by: Michel Audiard
- Produced by: Pierre Cabaud; Adrien Remaugé; André Hunebelle
- Starring: Raymond Rouleau; Anne Vernon; Tilda Thamar
- Cinematography: Marcel Grignon
- Edited by: Jean Feyte
- Music by: Jean Marion
- Production company: Production Artistique et Cinématographique
- Distributed by: Pathé Consortium Cinéma
- Release date: 15 January 1952
- Running time: 97 minutes
- Country: France
- Language: French

Massacre in Lace (French: Massacre en dentelles) is a 1952 French comedy crime film directed by André Hunebelle and starring Raymond Rouleau, Anne Vernon and Tilda Thamar. It was shot at the Saint-Maurice Studios in Paris. The film's sets were designed by the art director Lucien Carré. It is the third in the trilogy of films featuring the character of Georges Masse following Mission in Tangier (1949) and Beware of Blondes (1950).

== Synopsis ==
A playboy reporter takes a break from his holiday to track down some gangsters.

== Cast ==
- Raymond Rouleau as Georges Masse
- Anne Vernon as Thérésa Larsen
- Tilda Thamar as Clara Cassidi
- Bernard La Jarrige as P'tit Louis
- Maurice Teynac as Sophocle Zélos
- John Kitzmiller as Rocky Saddley
- Georges Chamarat as Alexandro Cassidi
- Monique Darbaud as Nora Cassidi
- Robert Vattier as Arsène de Loubiac
- Jacques Dynam as Pablo
- Monique Aïssata as Petite Lisette
- Louis Bugette as Carlos
- Anne-Marie Duverney as La secrétaire de l'agence
- Lud Germain as Sam Barnett

== Bibliography ==
- Hardy, Phil. The BFI Companion to Crime. A&C Black, 1997.
- Moine, Raphaëlle. Cinema Genre. John Wiley & Sons, 2009.
