= Jean-Paul Moulinot =

French actor

- Born: 30 June 1912; Nice
- Died: 3 December 1989 (aged 77); Ville-d'Avray
- Occupation: Actor
- Spouse: Elisabeth Yvette Hardy

Jean-Paul Moulinot (30 June 1912 – 3 December 1989) was a French actor, sociétaire of the Comédie-Française.

Elisabeth (Yvette) Hardy (1917–2000), a comedian at the TNP, was his wife. Close to Jean Vilar, he took part to the first Festival d'Avignon in 1947 and from 1951, the year the TNP reopened, he belonged to the troupe where he remained during all the years Jean Vilar was the director, then joined the Comédie-Française until his death.

== Career at the Comédie-Française ==
- Admission at the Comédie-Française in 1966
- Sociétaire in 1989
- 481st sociétaire
- 1937: Business is business by Octave Mirbeau, directed by Fernand Ledoux
- 1938: Cyrano de Bergerac by Edmond Rostand, directed by Pierre Dux
- 1966: Les Femmes savantes by Molière, directed by Jean Meyer
- 1966: Le commissaire est bon enfant by Georges Courteline and Jules Lévy, directed by Robert Manuel
- 1967: Le Jeu de l'amour et du hasard by Marivaux, directed by Maurice Escande
- 1967: Le Malade imaginaire by Molière, directed by Robert Manuel
- 1967: La Commère by Marivaux, directed by Michel Duchaussoy
- 1967: L'Émigré de Brisbane by Georges Schéhadé, directed by Jacques Mauclair
- 1967: L'Étourdi by Molière, directed by Jean-Paul Roussillon
- 1967: Le Médecin malgré lui by Molière, directed by Jean-Paul Roussillon
- 1968: Le Joueur by Regnard, directed by Jean Piat
- 1968: Ruy Blas by Victor Hugo, directed by Raymond Rouleau
- 1969: Les Italiens à Paris by Charles Charras and André Gille after Évariste Gherardi, directed by Jean Le Poulain
- 1969: Port-Royal by Henry de Montherlant, directed by Jean Meyer
- 1970: Malatesta by Henry de Montherlant, directed by Pierre Dux
- 1970: A Dream Play by August Strindberg, directed by Raymond Rouleau
- 1971: Becket ou l'Honneur de Dieu by Jean Anouilh, directed by the author and Roland Piétri
- 1972: Cyrano de Bergerac by Edmond Rostand, directed by Jacques Charon
- 1972: Volpone by Jules Romains and Stefan Zweig, directed by Gérard Vergez, Comédie-Française at the Théâtre de l'Odéon
- 1972: Graf Öderland by Max Frisch, directed by Jean-Pierre Miquel, Comédie-Française at the Théâtre de l'Odéon
- 1972: La Station Champbaudet by Eugène Labiche and Marc-Michel, directed by Jean-Laurent Cochet
- 1973: Le Malade imaginaire by Molière, directed by Jean-Laurent Cochet
- 1973: Dom Juan by Molière, directed by Antoine Bourseiller
- 1973: Les Femmes savantes by Molière, directed by Jean Piat
- 1973: L'École des femmes by Molière, directed by Jean-Paul Roussillon
- 1974: Hernani by Victor Hugo, directed by Robert Hossein
- 1974: L'Impromptu de Marigny, by Jean Poiret, directed by Jacques Charon
- 1975: Dialogues with Leucò by Cesare Pavese, directed by Antoine Bourseiller, Comédie-Française at the Petit Odéon
- 1976: Trafic by Louis Calaferte, directed by Jean-Pierre Miquel, Comédie-Française at the Petit Odéon
- 1976: Cyrano de Bergerac by Edmond Rostand, directed by Jean-Paul Roussillon
- 1976: Lorenzaccio by Alfred de Musset, directed by Franco Zeffirelli
- 1977: Doit-on le dire ? by Eugène Labiche, directed by Jean-Laurent Cochet
- 1978: A Flea In Her Ear by Eugène Labiche, directed by Jean-Laurent Cochet
- 1979: Ruy Blas by Victor Hugo, directed by Jacques Destoop
- 1979: L'Œuf by Félicien Marceau, directed by Jacques Rosny
- 1980: Simul et singulis, Soirées littéraires consacrées au Tricentenaire de la Comédie-Française, directed by Simon Eine, Alain Pralon and Jacques Destoop
- 1981: La Dame de chez Maxim by Georges Feydeau, directed by Jean-Paul Roussillon
- 1983: Triptychon by Max Frisch, directed by Roger Blin, Comédie-Française at the Théâtre de l'Odéon
- 1983: Amphitryon by Molière, directed by Philippe Adrien
- 1984: Ivanov by Tchekov, directed by Claude Régy
- 1986: The Liar by Corneille, directed by Alain Françon
- 1986: Le Bourgeois Gentilhomme by Molière, directed by Jean-Luc Boutté
- 1986: The Liar by Corneille, directed by Alain Françon
- 1987: La Manivelle by Robert Pinget, directed by Jean-Paul Roussillon, Comédie-Française at the Festival d'Avignon
- 1988: Endgame by Samuel Beckett, directed by Gildas Bourdet

== Outside the Comédie-Française ==
- 1945: Tartuffe by Molière, directed by Marcel Herrand, Théâtre des Mathurins
- 1946: Primavera by Claude Spaak, directed by Marcel Herrand, Théâtre des Mathurins
- 1947: Je vivrai un grand amour by Steve Passeur, Théâtre des Mathurins
- 1949: Le Légataire universel by Jean-François Regnard, directed by Georges Douking, Théâtre des Célestins
- 1949: Héloïse et Abélard by Roger Vailland, directed by Jean Marchat, Théâtre des Mathurins
- 1950: Henry IV by Luigi Pirandello, directed by André Barsacq, Théâtre de l'Atelier
- 1951: Mother Courage by Bertolt Brecht, directed by Jean Vilar, TNP Théâtre de la Cité Jardins Suresnes
- 1952: The Miser by Molière, directed by Jean Vilar, TNP Théâtre national de Chaillot, Festival d'Avignon
- 1952: Lorenzaccio by Alfred de Musset, directed by Gérard Philipe, TNP Festival d'Avignon
- 1956: Les Femmes savantes by Molière, directed by Jean-Paul Moulinot, TNP Théâtre de Chaillot
- 1956: Le Mariage de Figaro by Beaumarchais, directed by Jean Vilar, TNP Festival d'Avignon
- 1956: Platonov by Anton Tchekov, directed by Jean Vilar, Festival de Bordeaux, TNP
- 1957: Le Mariage de Figaro by Beaumarchais, directed by Jean Vilar, TNP Festival d'Avignon
- 1957: Henry IV by Luigi Pirandello, directed by Jean Vilar, TNP Festival d'Avignon, Théâtre de Chaillot
- 1957: Murder in the Cathedral by Thomas Stearns Eliot, directed by Jean Vilar, TNP Festival d'Avignon
- 1958: Ubu roi by Alfred Jarry, directed by Jean Vilar, TNP Théâtre de Chaillot
- 1958: Œdipe by André Gide, directed by Jean Vilar, TNP, Festival de Bordeaux, Festival d'Avignon
- 1958: L'École des femmes by Molière, directed by Georges Wilson, TNP Théâtre de Chaillot
- 1958: Lorenzaccio by Alfred de Musset, directed by Gérard Philipe, TNP Festival d'Avignon
- 1959: La Fête du cordonnier by Michel Vinaver after Thomas Dekker, directed by Georges Wilson, TNP Théâtre de Chaillot
- 1959: Murder in the Cathedral by Thomas Stearns Eliot, directed by Jean Vilar, TNP Festival d'Avignon
- 1959: Danton's Death by Georg Büchner, directed by Jean Vilar, TNP Théâtre de Chaillot
- 1959: Mother Courage by Bertolt Brecht, directed by Jean Vilar, TNP Festival d'Avignon
- 1960: Erik XIV by August Strindberg, directed by Jean Vilar, TNP Théâtre de Chaillot, Festival d'Avignon
- 1960: Mother Courage by Bertolt Brecht, directed by Jean Vilar, TNP Festival d'Avignon
- 1960: Ubu roi by Alfred Jarry, directed by Jean Vilar, TNP Théâtre de Chaillot
- 1960: The Resistible Rise of Arturo Ui by Bertolt Brecht, directed by Jean Vilar and Georges Wilson, TNP Théâtre de Chaillot
- 1960: Antigone by Sophocles, directed by Jean Vilar, Festival d'Avignon
- 1961: Antigone by Sophocles, directed by Jean Vilar, Festival d'Avignon
- 1965: La Seconde Surprise de l'amour by Marivaux, directed by Maurice Guillaud, Festival du Marais
- 1966: The Miser by Molière, directed by Jean Vilar, Festival du Marais Hôtel de Rohan

== Filmography ==
=== Cinema ===
- 1946: La Foire aux chimères (by Pierre Chenal)
- 1950: A Certain Mister (by Yves Ciampi)
- 1950: Lady Paname (by Henri Jeanson) - Bit part (uncredited)
- 1950: Gunman in the Streets (by Boris Lewin) - (uncredited)
- 1951: Paris Vice Squad (by Hervé Bromberger) - L'inspecteur qui prend la déposition au début du film (uncredited)
- 1951: The Strange Madame X (by Jean Grémillon) − Le majordome
- 1951: Victor (by Claude Heymann) − Le directeur de la banque
- 1951: La plus belle fille du monde (by Christian Stengel)
- 1951: My Wife Is Formidable (by André Hunebelle) − Le docteur
- 1952: We Are All Murderers (by André Cayatte) − Le directeur de la "santé"
- 1952: Monsieur Taxi (by André Hunebelle) − L'homme accidenté
- 1952: Le rideau rouge / Ce soir on joue Macbeth (by André Barsac)
- 1955: Black Dossier (by André Cayatte)
- 1957: Amour de poche (by Pierre Kast) − Cahuzac
- 1960: La Millième Fenêtre (by Robert Ménégoz) − (uncredited)
- 1962: The Devil and the Ten Commandments (by Julien Duvivier) − Le directeur de la banque (segment "Bien d'autrui ne prendras")
- 1963: OSS 117 se déchaîne (by André Hunebelle)
- 1963: The Fire Within (by Louis Malle) − Le docteur La Berbinais
- 1963: La Foire aux cancres (by Louis Daquin) − Le maire
- 1964: Mort, où est ta victoire ? (by Hervé Bromberger) − Belignat
- 1964: Monsieur (by Jean-Paul Le Chanois) − Maître Flament, le notaire
- 1964: Nick Carter va tout casser (by Henri Decoin) − Didier Formentaire
- 1964: Rien ne va plus (by Jean Bacqué) − Le baron
- 1964: Behold a Pale Horse (by Fred Zinnemann) − Le père Estéban
- 1965: Diamonds Are Brittle (by Nicolas Gessner) − Le bijoutier
- 1966: Lost Command (by Mark Robson) − De Guyot
- 1966: Sale temps pour les mouches (by Guy Lefranc) − Le général André Pujol
- 1968: Guns for San Sebastian (by Henri Verneuil)
- 1968: Tu seras terriblement gentille (by Dirk Sanders) − Le directeur du magasin
- 1969: Under the Sign of the Bull (by Gilles Grangier) − Pierre, le valet
- 1970: Une drôle de bourrique / L'âne de Zigliara by Jean Canolle) − L'évêque
- 1971: To Die of Love (by André Cayatte) − Monsieur Guénot
- 1973: The Dominici Affair (by Claude Bernard-Aubert) − Le médecin légiste
- 1974: Impossible Is Not French (by Robert Lamoureux) − De Sica
- 1976: Mado (by Claude Sautet) − Papa
- 1983: Les Oiseaux noirs (Svarta Faglar) (by Lasse Glomm) − Le père de Simone (final film role)

=== Television ===
- 1950: Agence Nostradamus (by Claude Barma)
- 1959: La Confession (TV Movie) − Ledward
- 1961: La caméra explore le temps − Le prince de Condé / Le roi Louis−Philippe
- 1961–1962: Le Théâtre de la jeunesse − Blazius / Gilles
- 1962: La Belle et son fantôme (by Bernard Hecht) − Walter de Lestrange
- 1962: Les Cinq Dernières Minutes (by Pierre Nivollet) − Le docteur
- 1962: L'inspecteur Leclerc enquête (by Jean Laviron) − Marquet
- 1963: Siegfried (by Marcel Cravenne) − Robineau
- 1963: Commandant X − Le consul
- 1964: Rocambole (by Jean-Pierre Decourt) − Lord Charring
- 1964: Une fille dans la montagne (TV Movie) − Gardin
- 1964: La montre en or (TV Movie) − Toupin
- 1965: Le Roi Lear (TV Movie, by Jean Kerchbron) − Le comte de Gloucester
- 1965: Sens interdit (TV Movie) − Daniel
- 1965: Merlusse (TV Movie) − Le proviseur
- 1966: Le Chevalier d'Harmental − Mallézieux
- 1966: The Miser (TV Movie) − Maître Jacques
- 1967: Saturnin Belloir (by Jacques-Gérard Cornu) − Saturnin Belloir
- 1967: Marion Delorme (TV Movie) − La marquis de Mangis
- 1968: Princesse Czardas (TV Movie) − Le prince
- 1968: Graf Yoster − Dr. Leander
- 1969: Le distrait (TV Movie) − Valère
- 1969: Fortune (by Henri Colpi) − Docteur Robinson
- 1970: Monsieur de Pourceaugnac (TV Movie) − Un suisse, Comédie−Française
- 1971: Si j'étais vous (TV Movie, by Ange Casta) − Oncle Firmin
- 1972: Ruy Blas (TV Movie) − Marquis de Santa Cruz, Comédie−Française
- 1972: La Station Champbaudet (TV Movie, Comédie−Française, by Georges Folgoas)
- 1973: La porteuse de pain − Jules Labroue
- 1973: L'étang de la Breure − M. de la Cazère
- 1973: Marie Dorval (TV Movie) − Merle
- 1973: Molière pour rire et pour pleurer (TV Movie, by Marcel Camus) − Le chancelier de Lamoignon
- 1974: Les Faucheurs de marguerites (TV Mini−Series, by Marcel Camus) − M. Perrier
- 1974: L'implantation (TV Movie) − Paul
- 1974: Jean Pinot, médecin d'aujourd'hui (by Michel Fermaud) − Dr. Clavé
- 1975: La médecin malgré lui (TV Movie) − Robert
- 1977: Madame Ex (TV Movie) − Le père de Louis
- 1977: Richelieu (by Jean-Pierre Decourt) − Le pape
- 1977: Lorenzaccio (TV Movie) − Guicciardini, Comédie-Française
- 1977: Ou vont les poissons rouges? (TV Movie) − Le pêcheur
- 1978: Ce diable d'homme (TV Mini−Series) − M. Arouet
- 1978: On ne badine pas avec l'amour (TV Movie) − La paysan, Comédie−Française
- 1980: L'œuf (TV Movie) − Eugène, Comédie−Française
- 1980: Julien Fontanes, magistrat − Me Tasille
- 1980: Jean-Sans-Terre (TV Movie) − Le beau−père
- 1982: La double inconstance (TV Movie) − Un seigneur, Comédie−Française
- 1982: Les Caprices de Marianne (TV Movie) − Malvolio
- 1982: Emmenez-moi au théâtre: Lorsque l'enfant paraît (TV Movie) − M. Jacquet
- 1982: La démobilisation générale (TV Movie) − Albert Sarraut

=== Dubbing ===
- 1960: Ben-Hur: French voice of the narrator.

== Bibliography ==
- Yvan Foucart: Dictionnaire des comédiens français disparus, Mormoiron : Éditions cinéma, 2008, 1185 p. ISBN 978-2-9531-1390-7
