= Mission in Tangier =

1949 film

Mission in Tangier Mission à Tanger
- Directed by: André Hunebelle
- Written by: Michel Audiard
- Produced by: André Hunebelle
- Starring: Raymond Rouleau; Gaby Sylvia; Mila Parély
- Cinematography: Marcel Grignon
- Edited by: Jean Feyte
- Music by: Jean Marion
- Production company: Production Artistique et Cinématographique
- Distributed by: Union Française de Production Cinématographique
- Release date: 4 June 1949
- Running time: 100 minutes
- Country: France
- Language: French

Mission in Tangier (French: Mission à Tanger) is a 1949 French spy thriller film directed by André Hunebelle and starring Raymond Rouleau, Gaby Sylvia and Mila Parély. It was the first in the trilogy of films featuring dashing reporter Georges Masse, and was followed in 1950 by Beware of Blondes. It was shot at the Billancourt Studios in Paris. The film's sets were designed by the art director Lucien Carré. It has been described as a French film noir.

== Plot ==
During the Second World War, Georges Masse undergoes a dangerous mission by taking secret documents from Tangiers to London.

== Cast ==
- Raymond Rouleau as Georges Masse
- Gaby Sylvia as Lily
- Mila Parély as Barbara
- Henri Nassiet as Alexandre Segard
- Louis de Funès as a Spanish general officer
- Christian Bertola as Henri Pelletier
- Pierre Destailles as Maurin
- Jo Dest as Herr von Kloster
- Max Révol as the barkeeper
- Madeleine Barbulée as the typist in the editorial department
- Billy Bourbon as the cabaret spectator
- Gregori Chmara as the Russian singer
- Monique Darbaud as von Kloster's female escort
- Gisèle François as La jeune vendeuse de fleurs du Cabaret
- Lucien Frégis as Un journaliste
- Louis de Funès as Le colonel espagnol
- Claude Garbe as La secrétaire de Segard
- Jacques Henley as Le colonel britannique au cabaret
- Jacqueline Huet as La dame du vestiaire au cabaret
- Nicole Jonesco as Une standardiste
- Véra Norman as La militaire dans l'avion
- Jean Richard as Le président
- Andrée Tainsy as La balayeuse du cabaret
- Gérard Séty as Un client du cabaret
- Van Doude as Un client du cabaret
- André Valmy as Beaudoit
- Bernard Lajarrige as P'tit Louis
- Nadine Tallier as Une jeune femme dans le cabaret

== Bibliography ==
- Moine, Raphaëlle. Cinema Genre. John Wiley & Sons, 2009.
- Spicer, Andrew. Historical Dictionary of Film Noir. Scarecrow Press, 2010.
