= A Certain Mister =

1950 film

- Directed by: Yves Ciampi
- Written by: Yannick Boysivon; Jacqueline Boisyvon
- Based on: A Certain Mister by Jean Le Hallier
- Produced by: Hervé Missir
- Starring: René Dary; Hélène Perdrière; Pierre Destailles
- Cinematography: Roger Arrignon
- Edited by: Jean Feyte
- Music by: Georges Van Parys
- Production company: Éclectiques Films
- Distributed by: U.F.P.C.
- Release date: 24 May 1950 (France)
- Running time: 90 minutes
- Country: France
- Language: French

A Certain Mister (French: Un certain monsieur) is a 1950 French crime film directed by Yves Ciampi and starring René Dary, Hélène Perdrière and Pierre Destailles. It was shot at the Billancourt Studios in Paris. The film's sets were designed by the art director Lucien Carré. The script is based on Jean Le Hallier's 1947 novel of the same title.

== Synopsis ==
When documents vital to French national security are stolen, the police join forces with three master criminals in order to recover them.

== Cast ==
- Hélène Perdrière as L'Index, member of the band
- René Dary as Le Pouce, member of the band
- Pierre Destailles as Le Majeur, member of the band
- Louis Seigner as Commissioner Clergé
- Marc Cassot as inspector César alias André Paris
- Junie Astor as Edmée Lamour
- Lise Delamare as Mrs. Lecorduvent
- Louis de Funès as Thomas Boudeboeuf, journalist of "l'avenir Sauveterrois"
- Alice Field as Mrs. Léonard
- Julienne Paroli as La bigote
- Paulette Andrieux as Mademoiselle Germaine Sabrelong, la fille du notaire
- René Blancard as Le commissaire Bellefontaine
- Roland Toutain as Un complice
- Emile Genevois as Un complice
- Julien Maffre as Un complice
- Paul Demange as Léonard
- Tony Taffin as Ottavio
- Robert Lussac as Hector
- Henri Vilbert as Antoine
- Alexandre Mihalesco as Alexandre Lecorduvent, antiquaire
- Titys as Un vieux monsieur
- Guy Favières as Le sacristain
- Catherine Arley
- Claude Castaing
- Jacques Sablon
- Edmond Tamiz
- Jean-Paul Moulinot
- Charles Bayard
- Emile Remongin
- Louis Bugette

== Bibliography ==
- Goble, Alan. The Complete Index to Literary Sources in Film. Walter de Gruyter, 1999.
- Vincendeau, Ginette. Stars and Stardom in French Cinema. Bloomsbury Publishing, 2000.
