= Two Pennies Worth of Violets =

1951 film

- Directed by: Jean Anouilh
- Written by: Monelle Valentin; Jean Anouilh
- Produced by: François Chavane; Marius Franay; Jean Le Duc; Alain Poiré
- Starring: Dany Robin; Georges Baconnet; Madeleine Barbulée
- Cinematography: Maurice Barry
- Edited by: Jean Feyte
- Music by: Georges Van Parys
- Production companies: Cinéphonic; Société Générale de Gestion Cinématographique; Francinex
- Distributed by: Gaumont Distribution
- Release date: 31 October 1951
- Running time: 98 minutes
- Country: France
- Language: French

Two Pennies Worth of Violets (French: Deux sous de violettes) is a 1951 French drama film directed by Jean Anouilh and starring Dany Robin, Georges Baconnet and Madeleine Barbulée. It was one of two films directed by the dramatist Anouilh along with Traveling Light (1944). It was shot at the Billancourt Studios in Paris. The film's sets were designed by the art director Léon Barsacq.

== Synopsis ==
Thérèse is a young flower seller in Paris who has had a hard life with an unsympathetic family. Her encounters with men are also tragic as they prove to be either predatory or abandon her when she needs them most.

== Cast ==
- Dany Robin as Thérèse Desforges
- Georges Baconnet as Pignot - le fleuriste
- Madeleine Barbulée as La chanteuse des rues
- Michel Bouquet as Maurice Desforges
- Georges Chamarat as Monsieur Dubreck
- Jacques Clancy as André Delgrange
- Léonce Corne as Le médecin
- Henri Crémieux as Bousquet
- Max Dalban as Le cafetier
- Mona Dol as Madame Lambert
- Yvette Etiévant as Lucienne Desforge
- Gabrielle Fontan as La concierge
- Madeleine Geoffroy as Madame Pignot
- Yolande Laffon as Madame Delgrange
- Madeleine Lambert as Une amie
- Héléna Manson as Jeanne Desforges
- Jane Marken as Madame Dubreck
- Geneviève Morel as Germaine
- Marcel Pérès as Le contremaître
- Jean Pommier as Yvon
- Marcelle Praince as Une vieille dame
- Yves Robert as Charlot
- Etienne Yvernès as Le garçon
- Monique Watteau as Simone

== Bibliography ==
- Oscherwitz, Dayna & Higgins, Maryellen. The A to Z of French Cinema. Scarecrow Press, 2009.
