= Bernard La Jarrige =

French actor

- Born: 25 February 1912; Saint-Mandé, Val-de-Marne, France
- Died: 29 May 1999 (aged 87); Paris, France
- Occupation: Actor
- Years active: 1938–1998 (film)

Bernard La Jarrige (25 February 1912 – 29 May 1999) was a French film and television actor. His name is sometimes written as Bernard Lajarrige.

== Selected filmography ==
- Orage (1938) - Un copain (uncredited)
- La cité des lumières (1938)
- The Emigrant (1940) - Le journaliste (uncredited)
- La loi du printemps (1942)
- Patricia (1942) - Le gars du village
- L'auberge de l'abîme (1943)
- Fou d'amour (1943) - Le spectateur
- Angels of Sin (1943) - Un gardien de la prison
- The Angel of the Night (1944) - (uncredited)
- The Woman Who Dared (1944) - Le mécano (uncredited)
- Les Dames du Bois de Boulogne (1945)
- Lessons in Conduct (1946) - Roland
- Man About Town (1947) - Paulo
- Loves, Delights and Organs (1947) - Martin
- Four Knaves (1947) - Albert Furet - un cambrioleur
- Emile the African (1948) - Daniel Cormier
- Three Boys, One Girl (1948) - Michel Dourville
- Mission in Tangier (1949) - P'tit Louis
- Rendezvous in July (1949) - Guillaume Rousseau
- The Chocolate Girl (1949) - Raoul Pinglet - le chauffeur
- Millionaires for One Day (1949) - Philippe Dubreuil - un journaliste
- Not Any Weekend for Our Love (1950) - Christian, frère de Franck
- The Little Zouave (1950) - Louis
- Casimir (1950) - Paul-André - un peintre
- Beware of Blondes (1950) - Petit Louis
- The Prettiest Sin in the World (1951) - Bébert / Albert Pignol
- The Cape of Hope (1951) - Raymond
- My Wife Is Formidable (1951) - Le joueur de belote (uncredited)
- Massacre in Lace (1952) - P'tit Louis
- Monsieur Leguignon, Signalman (1952) - Maître Follenfant - un avocat
- Beauties of the Night (1952) - Léon - le gendarme
- Les détectives du dimanche (1953) - Laurent
- Women of Paris (1953) - Inspecteur Corbin
- Nuits andalouses (1954) - Gaston
- Oh No, Mam'zelle (1954) - Loriot
- Felices Pascuas (1954) - Juan
- Les chiffonniers d'Emmaüs (1955) - Philippe, le légionnaire
- Caroline and the Rebels (1955) - Lavaux, l'ordonnance de Juan
- Montmartre Nights (1955) - L'inspecteur Bailly
- Thirteen at the Table (1955) - Raphaël
- La Traversée de Paris (1956) - Un agent de police
- Ah, quelle équipe! (1957) - Louis Sévrier
- Élisa (1957) - M. Granier
- Une nuit aux Baléares (1957) - Dysian Mekanovitch
- Les Espions (1957) - Le garçon de café
- Not Delivered (1958) - L'inspecteur Le Crocq
- Le insaziabili (1958) - L'impresario
- Archimède le clochard (1959) - Un poissonnier
- Le secret du Chevalier d'Éon (1959) - Pascal d'Éon de Beaumont
- Marie of the Isles (1959) - Petit rôle (uncredited)
- Nathalie, agent secret (1959)
- The Cat Shows Her Claws (1960) - Dalmier dit Athos
- Pantalaskas (1960) - Félix Clergeon
- A Mistress for the Summer (1960) - Le barman
- Quai du Point-du-Jour (1960) - Robert Flic
- Murder at 45 R.P.M. (1960) - Moureu
- Il suffit d'aimer (1961) - François Soubirous
- Captain Fracasse (1961) - Le serviteur du baron de Sigognac (uncredited)
- Karolina Rijecka (1961)
- Sherlock Holmes and the Deadly Necklace (1962) - Inspector French
- The Bread Peddler (1963) - Le préfet de police
- Requiem pour un caïd (1964) - Inspecteur Lenoir
- The Train (1964) - Bernard - Doctor (uncredited)
- The Counterfeit Constable (1964) - Un supporter français
- Angélique, Marquise des Anges (1964) - Le baron de Monteloup
- The Two Orphans (1965) - Rumagnac
- Pleins feux sur Stanislas (1965) - Paul
- The Exterminators (1965) - Bruno Schwartz
- Trap for the Assassin (1966) - Bernadit (uncredited)
- Les Créatures (1966) - Doctor Desteau
- Mayerling (1968) - Loschek
- Les patates (1969) - Le maire de Bourg-Fidèle
- Darling Lili (1970) - French Pilot Singing 'La Marseillaise' (uncredited)
- Les stances à Sophie (1971) - M. Aignan
- The Bar at the Crossing (1972) - Nicky Holly
- Le droit d'aimer (1972)
- Five Leaf Clover (1972)
- L'affaire Crazy Capo (1973)
- The Four Charlots Musketeers 2 (1974) - Un aubergiste de Bauvais
- Let Joy Reign Supreme (1975) - Amaury de Lambilly
- Le bougnoul (1975) - Rémy Cortin - le patron du bistrot
- On a retrouvé la septième compagnie (1975) - L'artificier
- Madame Rosa (1977) - Louis Charmette - un retraité SNCF
- Le Crabe-tambour (1977) - Le recteur
- Violette Nozière (1978) - Monsieur de Pinguet (uncredited)
- From Hell to Victory (1979) - (uncredited)
- Bloodline (1979) - Butler
- La puce et le privé (1981) - Le vieux compagnon du colonel
- Le cowboy (1985) - Alphonse
- Le radeau de la Méduse (1990) - Bonnefoux
- Le Roi de Paris (1995) - Champmartin (final film role)

== Bibliography ==
- Ann C. Paietta. Saints, Clergy and Other Religious Figures on Film and Television, 1895–2003. McFarland, 2005.
