= Guinguette (film) =

1959 film

- Directed by: Jean Delannoy
- Written by: Dominique Daudrey; Henri Jeanson; Jean Delannoy
- Produced by: Joseph Bercholz; Henry Deutschmeister
- Starring: Zizi Jeanmaire; Jean-Claude Pascal; Paul Meurisse
- Cinematography: Pierre Montazel
- Edited by: Henri Taverna
- Music by: Georges Van Parys
- Production companies: Les Films Gibé; Franco London Films Continental Produzione
- Distributed by: Gaumont Distribution
- Release date: 4 March 1959
- Running time: 104 minutes
- Countries: France; Italy
- Language: French

Guinguette is a 1959 French-Italian comedy drama film directed by Jean Delannoy and starring Zizi Jeanmaire, Jean-Claude Pascal and Paul Meurisse. It was shot at the Billancourt Studios in Paris and on location around Val-de-Marne. The film's sets were designed by the art director René Renoux. It was distributed by the major studio Gaumont.

== Synopsis ==
Former prostitute Renée has earned enough money on the streets of Paris to buy a riverside café on the outskirts of the city that she has long dreamed of running. Her car dealer lover Marco suggests using the unused barn to store second-hand cars, but these ultimately prove to be stolen.

== Cast ==
- Zizi Jeanmaire as Renée dit 'Guinguette'
- Jean-Claude Pascal as Marco
- Paul Meurisse as Le vicomte Edouard de Villancourt
- Cristina Gaioni as Maryse
- Marie Mergey as Julie
- Odette Laure as Tartine
- Annette Poivre as Marie-Maurviette
- Madeleine Barbulée as La femme de Monsieur Jean
- Armande Navarre as Gélinotte
- Dominique Davray as Marcelle
- Sophie Grimaldi as La méridionale
- Pierre Destailles as L'inspecteur
- Georges Poujouly as François
- Louis Bugette as Le brigadier
- Guy Decomble as L'artisan peintre
- Georges Lycan as Bascule
- Jacques Hilling as Le docteur
- Jacques Marin as Albert
- Mario David as Un fêtard
- Henri Vilbert as Monsieur Jean
- Raymond Bussières as Biscotte

== Bibliography ==
- Gili, Jean A. & Tassone, Aldo. Parigi-Roma: 50 anni di coproduzioni italo-francesi (1945-1995). Editrice Il castoro, 1995.
- Marie, Michel. The French New Wave: An Artistic School. John Wiley & Sons, 2008.
- Rège, Philippe. Encyclopedia of French Film Directors, Volume 1. Scarecrow Press, 2009.
