= Monsieur Taxi =

1952 film

- Directed by: André Hunebelle
- Written by: Jean Halain
- Produced by: Pierre Cabaud; André Hunebelle; Adrien Remaugé
- Starring: Michel Simon; Jane Marken; Jean Brochard
- Cinematography: Paul Cotteret
- Edited by: Jean Feyte
- Music by: Jean Marion
- Production company: Production Artistique et Cinématographique
- Distributed by: Pathé Consortium Cinéma
- Release date: 3 September 1952
- Running time: 78 minutes
- Country: France
- Language: French

Monsieur Taxi is a 1952 French comedy film directed André Hunebelle and starring Michel Simon and Jane Marken and Jean Brochard. It is about Pierre Verger, who is nicknamed Monsieur Taxi and always in company of a smart young dog called "Gangster". It was shot at the Saint-Maurice Studios in Paris and on location around the city including in Saint-Maur-des-Fossés. The film's sets were designed by the art director Lucien Carré.

== Plot ==
In Paris Monsieur Taxi comes across a bag a passenger seems to have forgotten on the backseat. The bag contains a considerable amount of money and he is desperate to return it. While trying to find the owner of the bag he is eventually taken for a criminal and arrested by police. But in the end everything is straightened out and he lives to see his both children get married.

== Cast ==
- Michel Simon as Pierre Verger (Monsieur Taxi)
- Jane Marken as Louise, wife of Léon
- Jean Brochard as Léon, husband of Louise, policeman
- Monique Darbaud as Lily Minouche, the dancer
- Jean Carmet as François
- André Valmy as the main inspector
- Claire Olivier as Hélène Verger
- Pauline Carton as the aunt of Lily
- Espanita Cortez as the Italian
- Jeanne Fusier-Gir as Mrs Angela
- Nathalie Nattier as La Rousse
- Paul Azaïs as Henri - le barman
- Louis Bugette as L'inspecteur adjoint
- Jean Carmet as François
- André Dalibert as Le commissaire de police
- Paul Demange as Le petit homme qui téléphone
- Floriane Prévot as Jacqueline Verger
- Paul Faivre as Gustave - un chauffeur de taxi
- Madeleine Barbulée as La tricoteuse
- Monique Darbaud as Lily Minouche
- Louis Blanche as Le menuisier
- Georgette Anys as La marchande de salades
- Louis de Funès as Le peintre qui voit rouge

== Bibliography ==
- Bessy, Maurice & Chirat, Raymond. Histoire du cinéma français: 1951-1955. Pygmalion, 1989.
