= The Lady of the Camellias (1953 French-Italian film) =

1953 film directed by Raymond Bernard

- Directed by: Raymond Bernard
- Written by: Raymond Bernard; Jacques Natanson
- Based on: The Lady of the Camellias by Alexandre Dumas
- Produced by: Albert Dodrumez; Pierre Gurgo-Salice; Maurice Lehmann; André Mouëzy-Éon
- Starring: Micheline Presle; Gino Cervi; Roland Alexandre
- Cinematography: Philippe Agostini
- Edited by: Charlotte Guilbert
- Music by: Francis Lopez
- Production companies: Compagnie Commerciale Française Cinématographique; Royalty Films; Union des Distributeurs Indépendants; Lux Film
- Distributed by: Compagnie Commerciale Française Cinématographique; Lux Film
- Release date: 6 November 1953
- Running time: 111 minutes
- Countries: France; Italy
- Language: French

The Lady of the Camellias (French: La dame aux camélias, Italian: La signora dalle camelie) is a 1953 French-Italian historical drama film directed by Raymond Bernard and starring Micheline Presle, Gino Cervi and Roland Alexandre. It is based on the 1848 novel of the same title by Alexandre Dumas. It was shot in Gevacolour at the Billancourt Studios in Paris and on location around the city. The film's sets were designed by the art director Léon Barsacq.

== Cast ==
- Micheline Presle as Marguerite Gauthier
- Gino Cervi as Monsieur Duval
- Roland Alexandre as Armand Duval
- Alba Arnova as Olympe
- Jean Parédès as Comte Varville
- Jean Brochard as Le notaire
- Mathilde Casadesus as Prudence
- Jacques Clancy as Gaston Rieux
- Henri Crémieux as Chambourg
- Maurice Escande as Le duc
- Jacques Famery as Un ami d'Armand
- Jane Morlet as Nanine
- Claude Nicot as Léon Chambourg
- Germaine Delbat as L'épouse du notaire
- Robert Seller as Le maître d'hôtel
- Javotte Lehman as Violette
- Françoise Soulié as Blanche

== Bibliography ==
- Goble, Alan. (1999) The Complete Index to Literary Sources in Film. Walter de Gruyter. p.137
- Hayward, Susan. (2010) French Costume Drama of the 1950s: Fashioning Politics in Film. Intellect Books, p. 464
