= Great Man (film) =

1951 film

- Directed by: Yves Ciampi
- Written by: Yves Ciampi; Pierre Véry
- Produced by: André Paulvé
- Starring: Pierre Fresnay; Renée Devillers; Jean-Claude Pascal
- Cinematography: Marcel Grignon
- Edited by: Roger Dwyre
- Music by: Joseph Kosma
- Production companies: DisCina; Éclair-Journal
- Release date: 28 November 1951
- Running time: 95 minutes
- Country: France
- Language: French

Great Man (French: Un grand patron) is a 1951 French drama film directed by Yves Ciampi and starring Pierre Fresnay, Renée Devillers and Jean-Claude Pascal.

The film's art direction was by René Moulaert.

== Cast ==
- Pierre Fresnay as Le professeur Louis Delage.
- Renée Devillers as Florence Delage
- Jean-Claude Pascal as L'interne Marcillac
- Claire Duhamel as Catherine Delage
- Michel Vadet as Le docteur Larmy
- Robert Moor as Le professeur Peccavi
- Claude Nicot as Barby
- Philippe Mareuil as Georges
- Ky Duyen as Chang - le majordome
- Maurice Ronet as François
- Émile Genevois as L'ami de Gaston
- Raymond Galle as Un médecin
- Bernard Hubrenne as Un élève
- Catherine Romane as Paulette
- Georgette Talazac as L'infirmière
- Georgette Anys as Madame Berval
- Claire Muriel as Une malade
- Christian Fourcade as Emile
- Serge Lecointe as Le petit Albert
- Elisa Lamotte as La dame d'Orléans
- Nadine Alari as Yvette
- Madeleine Barbulée as Marie-Laure
- Marguerite Garcya as Madame Martin
- Tania Soucault as Jacky
- Judith Magre
- Perrette Darbon
- Christiane Barry as Jacqueline
- Pierre Destailles as Gaston Berval
- Roland Alexandre as Jacques Brulanges
- Marcel André as Le docteur Charles Tannard
- Nadine Bellaigue
- Anne Béranger
- Henri Doublier
- Maguy Horiot
- Frédérique Hébrard
- Julien Maffre as Un malade
- Dominique Marcas
- Jacques Monod as Le gendarme
- Bernard Musson as Un assistant du docteur Delage
- Alain Raffael as Petit rôle
- Joëlle Robin
- Jean Thielment

== Bibliography ==
- James Monaco. The Encyclopedia of Film. Perigee Books, 1991.
