= Georgette Anys =

French actress (1909–1993)

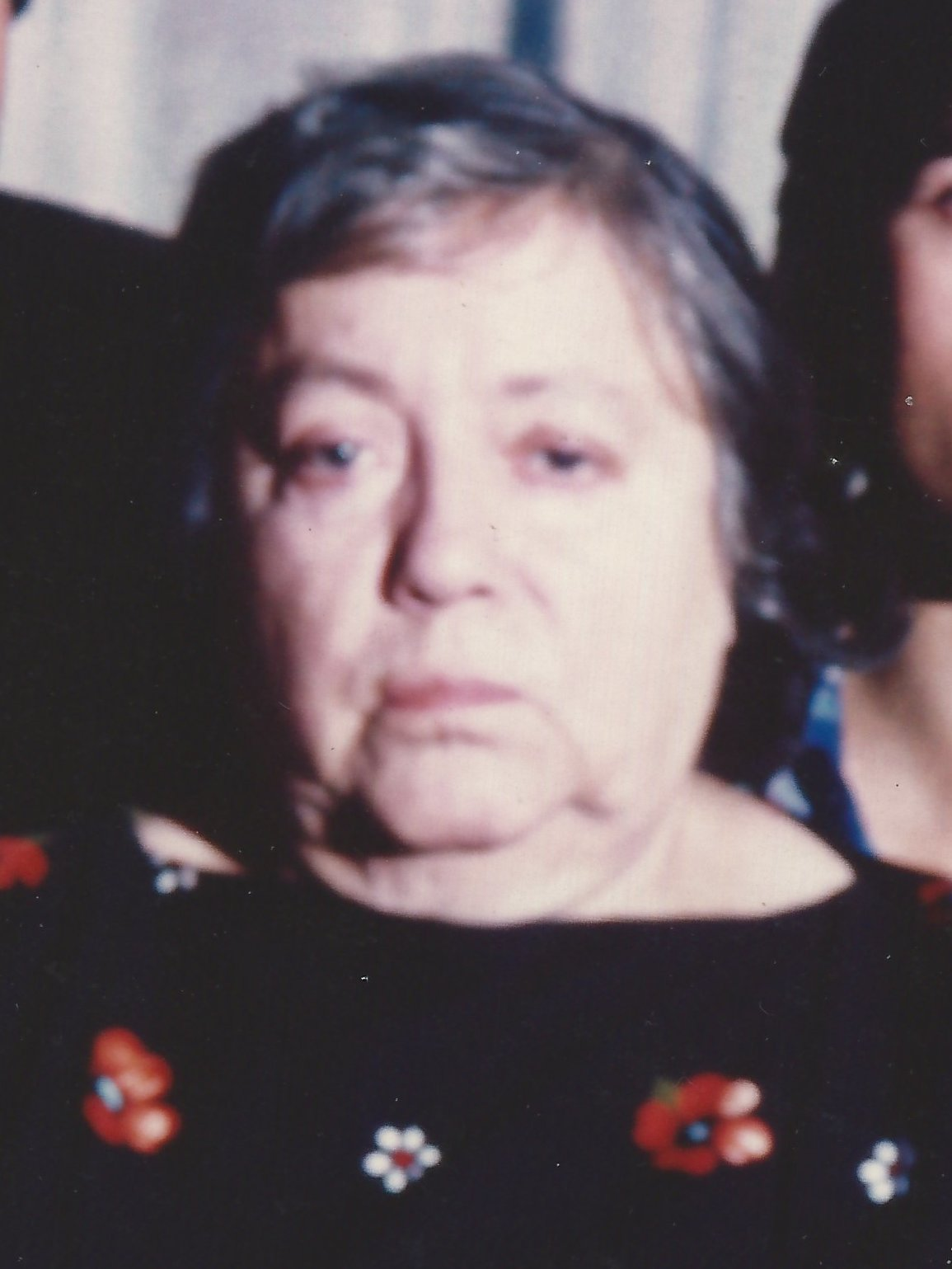
- Anys in 1977
- Born: 15 July 1909; Bagneux, Seine, France
- Died: 4 March 1993 (aged 85); Les Mureaux, Yvelines, France
- Occupation: Actress
- Years active: 1930–1984 (film & TV)

Georgette Anys (15 July 1909 – 4 March 1993) was a French film and television actress. A character actress, she appeared mainly in French productions, but also some American films which were shot in Europe including Alfred Hitchcock's To Catch a Thief in which she plays Cary Grant's housekeeper Germaine.

== Selected filmography ==
- Le Roi des resquilleurs (1930)
- Sending of Flowers (1950) - La spectatrice exubérante
- Old Boys of Saint-Loup (1950) - La voyageuse à l'enfant (uncredited)
- Quay of Grenelle (1950) - Minor rôle (uncredited)
- Mystery in Shanghai (1950)
- Beware of Blondes (1950) - Une sténodactylo (uncredited)
- La rue sans loi (1950) - (uncredited)
- Without Leaving an Address (1951) - La concierge de Forestier
- Under the Sky of Paris (1951) - Madame Malingret
- Mr. Peek-a-Boo (1951) - Maria (uncredited)
- The Two Girls (1951) - La lavandière
- They Were Five (1951) - (uncredited)
- La vie chantée (1951) - (uncredited)
- Moumou (1951) - La masseuse
- No Vacation for Mr. Mayor (1951) - Une créancière
- Great Man (1951) - Madame Berval
- Alone in Paris (1951) - La dame du métro
- Fanfan la Tulipe (1952) - Madame Tranche-Montagne
- Alone in the World (1952) - Mme Dussaut
- Monsieur Taxi (1952) - La marchande de salades
- La danseuse nue (1952)
- Run Away Mr. Perle (1952) - La patronne du bistrot de Romainville
- Holiday for Henrietta (1952) - La fleuriste
- My Husband Is Marvelous (1952) - L'aubergiste
- Double or Quits (1953) - Une spectatrice
- The Call of Destiny (1953) - La grosse Lolo
- Minuit... Quai de Bercy (1953) - Une cliente (uncredited)
- Innocents in Paris (1953) - Madame Celestin
- Little Boy Lost (1953) - Madame Quilleboeuf
- A Day to Remember (1953) - Jeanne Sautet (uncredited)
- Scampolo 53 (1953)
- L'Étrange Désir de monsieur Bard (1954) - Julie, l'épicière
- La chair et le diable (1954) - Mme Ancelin
- The Women Couldn't Care Less (1954) - Mrs. Martinguez
- Le Feu dans la peau (1954) - La veuve Barrot
- Madame du Barry (1954) - La citoyenne
- Pas de coup dur pour Johnny (1955)
- Les évadés (1955) - La travailleuse libre
- The Impossible Mr. Pipelet (1955) - Tante Mathilde
- To Catch a Thief (1955) - Germaine
- Milord l'Arsouille (1955)
- Thirteen at the Table (1955) - Marie-Louise Taburot
- Maid in Paris (1956)
- The Adventures of Gil Blas (1956) - Maria
- Marie Antoinette Queen of France (1956) - Une émeutière
- Les mains liées (1956)
- In the Manner of Sherlock Holmes (1956) - La femme de ménage
- Blood to the Head (1956) - Titine Babin
- La Traversée de Paris (1956) - Lucienne Couronne, la patronne du cafe Belotte
- Mannequins of Paris (1956) - Madame Vauthier
- L'homme aux clefs d'or (1956) - Mme Irma, la patronne
- Man and Child (1956) - (uncredited)
- Ah, quelle équipe! (1957) - Maman Jo
- The Vintage (1957) - Marie Morel (uncredited)
- Adorables démons (1957) - The concierge
- Mademoiselle and Her Gang (1957) - Gravos
- Les Espions (1957) - La buraliste
- Le désir mène les hommes (1957) - Félicie
- Sylviane de mes nuits (1957) - La cabaretière
- First of May (1958) - Mme Tartet
- Le Miroir à deux faces (1958) - Marguerite Benoît
- Dangerous Games (1958) - La femme devenue folle à la mort de son fils
- Quay of Illusions (1959) - La patronne de La Sirène
- Drôles de phénomènes (1959) - Mariette
- Nuits de Pigalle (1959) - La Maharanée
- La nuit des traqués (1959) - Maria - La patronne du café
- Le pain des Jules (1960) - Zoé
- Fanny (1961) - Honorine (Fanny's Mother)
- The Last Judgment (1961) - Miser's Wife (uncredited)
- Jessica (1962) - Mamma Parigi
- Bon Voyage! (1962) - Madame Clebert
- Love Is a Ball (1963) - Mme. Gallou
- Le Chant du monde (1965) - La voisine de Clara
- Moment to Moment (1966) - Louise
- Moonshiner's Woman (1968) - Sharon
- Jupiter (1971)
- Le seuil du vide (1972) - La mère de Wanda
- Les gants blancs du diable (1973)
- Zig Zag (1975) - La cantatrice
- L'évasion de Hassan Terro (1976)
- À l'ombre d'un été (1976) - La femme de ménage
- Cheech & Chong's The Corsican Brothers (1984) - Knitting lady #1

== Bibliography ==
- Glancy, Mark. Cary Grant, the Making of a Hollywood Legend. Oxford University Press, 2020.
