= Women Are Crazy =

1950 film

- Directed by: Gilles Grangier
- Written by: Gilles Grangier; Jean Halain
- Based on: Château Historique by Marcelle Berr de Turique and Alexandre Bisson
- Produced by: François Chavane; Marius Franay; Maurice Urbain
- Starring: Raymond Rouleau; Gaby Sylvia; Colette Richard
- Cinematography: Maurice Barry
- Edited by: Jean Feyte
- Music by: Jean Marion
- Production companies: Cinéphonic; Union Française de Production Cinématographique
- Distributed by: Filmsonor
- Release date: 15 September 1950
- Running time: 90 minutes
- Country: France
- Language: French

Women Are Crazy (French: Les femmes sont folles) is a 1950 French comedy film directed by Gilles Grangier and starring Raymond Rouleau, Gaby Sylvia and Colette Richard. It is based on the play Château Historique by Marcelle Berr de Turique and Alexandre Bisson. It was shot at the Billancourt Studios in Paris. The film's sets were designed by the art director Lucien Carré.

== Cast ==
- Raymond Rouleau as Claude Barrois
- Gaby Sylvia as Marguerite
- Colette Richard as Geneviève Robilleau
- Robert Arnoux as Gaston
- Pierre Destailles as Justin
- François Joux as Le médecin
- Louis Florencie as L'éditeur
- Maïa Poncet as La générale
- Nicole Jonesco as Mariette
- Marcel Delaître as Le général
- Jean Carmet as Emile
- Noël Roquevert as Le capitaine Cabriac
- Yves Deniaud as Hector Robilleau
- Jacques Beauvais as Le régisseur
- Jacques Dynam as Le cousin Fernand
- Georges Flateau as L'Américain
- Léon Pauléon as Duval

== Bibliography ==
- Bessy, Maurice & Chirat, Raymond. Histoire du cinéma français: encyclopédie des films, 1940–1950. Pygmalion, 1986
- Rège, Philippe. Encyclopedia of French Film Directors, Volume 1. Scarecrow Press, 2009.
