= Émile Genevois =

French actor (1918–1962)

- Born: 1 January 1918; Barlin, France
- Died: 19 September 1962 (aged 44)
- Occupation: Actor
- Years active: 1934 - 1962 (film)

Émile Genevois (1 January 1918 – 19 September 1962) was a French film actor. Genevois appeared in over ninety films and television programmes, generally in character roles.

== Selected filmography ==
- Les Misérables (1934) - Gavroche
- Crainquebille (1934) - La Souris - un gosse qui se prend d'affection pour Crainquebille
- La cinquième empreinte (1934) - Le commis pâtissier
- La jeune fille d'une nuit (1934)
- Maria Chapdelaine (1934) - Tit-Bé Chapdelaine
- The Slipper Episode (1935) - Le groom
- Le billet de mille (1935)
- Les yeux noirs (1935)
- La fille de Madame Angot (1935)
- Debout là-dedans! (1935)
- Les amants terribles (1936)
- Rose (1936)
- The Brighton Twins (1936) - Le gamin (uncredited)
- La Bête Humaine (1938) - Un garçon de ferme (uncredited)
- Portrait of Innocence (1941) - Gros Charles
- Le Mariage de Chiffon (1942) - Le groom
- Midnight in Paris (1942) - Le chasseur (uncredited)
- Majestic Hotel Cellars (1945) - Le jeune cuistot (uncredited)
- Son of France (1946) - Marcel
- Gates of the Night (1946) - (uncredited)
- The Heart on the Sleeve (1948) - Le deuxième Homme
- Les dieux du dimanche (1949) - Carrel
- Jo la Romance (1949) - Le vendeur de journaux
- Five Red Tulips (1949) - Robert
- Je n'aime que toi... (1949) - Le laitier (uncredited)
- At the Grand Balcony (1949) - Contact
- Le furet (1950)
- The Little Zouave (1950) - Le vendeur de journaux
- A Certain Mister (1950) - Un complice
- Justice est faite (1950) - Un serveur du Roi Soleil (uncredited)
- Quay of Grenelle (1950) - Le vendeur de journaux
- Three Telegrams (1950) - Le concierge
- Lost Souvenirs (1950) - Le crieur de journaux (uncredited)
- The Straw Lover (1950) - Le photographe
- Les mémoires de la vache Yolande (1951)
- Le plus joli péché du monde (1951) - Le groom (uncredited)
- La grande vie (1951) - Un ouvrier
- The Voyage to America (1951) - Le facteur
- The Cape of Hope (1951) - Un consommateur au bar (uncredited)
- Great Man (1951) - L'ami de Gaston
- Le Plaisir (1952) - Le groom (segment "Le Masque") (uncredited)
- Casque d'Or (1952) - Billy
- The Man in My Life (1952) - M. Grino (uncredited)
- Allô... je t'aime (1952)
- La Minute de vérité (1952) - Le groom
- Holiday for Henrietta (1952) - Petit rôle (uncredited)
- It Happened in Paris (1952) - Le groom
- A Hundred Francs a Second (1953) - Le camelot (uncredited)
- Follow That Man (1953) - Le garagiste (uncredited)
- The Long Teeth (1953) - L'homme qui remet un paquet au chauffeur de M. Walter (uncredited)
- Rue de l'Estrapade (1953) - Petit Louis (uncredited)
- The Earrings of Madame de… (1953) - Un soldat (uncredited)
- Virgile (1953) - (uncredited)
- This Man Is Dangerous (1953) - L'athlète
- The Most Wanted Man (1953) - Un Detenu (uncredited)
- Adam est... Ève (1954) - Le garçon livreur
- One Step to Eternity (1954) - Le postier
- Les Chiffonniers d'Emmaüs (1955) - Filot
- Oasis (1955) - Margis
- Rififi (1955) - Charlie
- Men in White (1955) - Le blessé de la main
- Papa, maman, ma femme et moi (1955) - Un coureur cycliste (uncredited)
- L'impossible Monsieur Pipelet (1955) - Un spectateur à la boxe
- Les Nuits de Montmartre (1955)
- Madelon (1955) - Soldat
- La meilleure part (1955) - Un ouvrier
- If Paris Were Told to Us (1956) - Un pêcheur (uncredited)
- People of No Importance (1956) - Un routier au garage (uncredited)
- Law of the Streets (1956)
- Meeting in Paris (1956) - Le maçon (uncredited)
- La Joyeuse Prison (1956) - Petit Louis - un détenu cambrioleur (uncredited)
- Le sang à la tête (1956) - Le garçon de course (uncredited)
- I'll Get Back to Kandara (1956) - Le garçon de café
- The Happy Road (1957) - Station-master (uncredited)
- Jusqu'au dernier (1957) - Le garçon de café (uncredited)
- Les 3 font la paire (1957) - Dumont
- Sénéchal le magnifique (1957) - Fred - le régisseur de la troupe de théâtre (uncredited)
- Le Dos au mur (1958) - (uncredited)
- Les Misérables (1958) - Le cocher de l'omnibus
- Le Temps des œufs durs (1958) - L'homme qui repêche Raoul de l'eau
- Montparnasse 19 (1958) - Le garçon du bal musette (uncredited)
- Incognito (1958) - Le rabatteur
- En légitime défense (1958) - Le marchand de journaux
- The Mask of the Gorilla (1958) - Le géôlier (uncredited)
- Et ta soeur (1958) - Jojo
- Madame et son auto (1958)
- 125 rue Montmartre (1959) - (uncredited)
- Rue des prairies (1959) - Un prisonnier (uncredited)
- Die Gans von Sedan (1959)
- Le Baron de l'écluse (1960) - Un client de l'auberge
- Women Are Like That (1960) - Le second agent cycliste
- It Happened All Night (1960) - Drunkard
- Le caïd (1960) - L'agent cycliste (uncredited)
- The President (1961) - L'homme en vélo
- La peau et les os (1961)

== Bibliography ==
- Cardullo, Bert. Vittorio De Sica: Actor, Director, Auteur. Cambridge Scholars Publishing, 2009.
- Holmstrom, John. The Moving Picture Boy: An International Encyclopaedia from 1895 to 1995, Norwich, Michael Russell, 1996, pp. 84–85.
