= Roland Alexandre =

French actor (1927–1956)

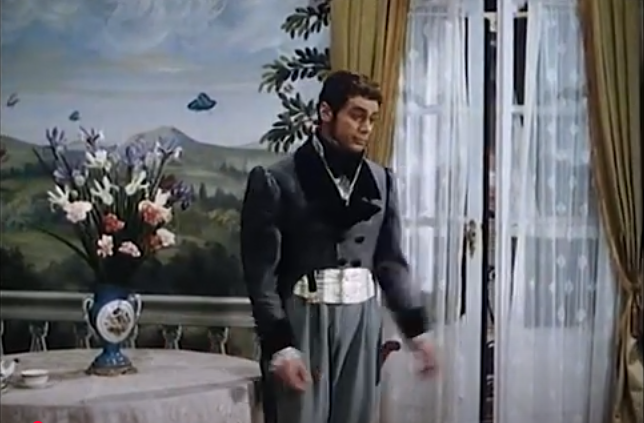
- Roland Alexandre in a scene from the film "Casa Ricordi"
- Born: 6 November 1927; Paris, France
- Died: 1 February 1956 (aged 28); Paris, France
- Occupation: Actor
- Years active: 1951–1956 (film)

Roland Alexandre (6 November 1927 – 1 February 1956) was a French stage and film actor. Having established himself at the Comédie-Française, he appeared in eleven films before his early death by suicide. In 1954 he portrayed the composer Gioachino Rossini in the film House of Ricordi.

== Biography ==
After graduating from the Conservatoire, he made his stage debut, playing in Jean Richard (actor), with whom he toured extensively, notably in Germany. He joined the Comédie-Française in 1950.

Between 1951 and 1955, he took part in ten films, including Great Man (film) by Yves Ciampi alongside Pierre Fresnay, The Lady of the Camellias (1953 film) with Micheline Presle, and Napoléon (1955 film) by and with Sacha Guitry.

Depressed after the death of his father, to whom he was very close, he took his own life at the age of 28. He was once engaged to Juliette Gréco.

== Selected filmography ==
- Great Man (1951)
- Pleasures of Paris (1952)
- Midnight Witness (1953)
- The Lady of the Camellias (1953)
- House of Ricordi (1954)
- Das Fräulein von Scuderi (1955)
- The Duratons (1955)

== Bibliography ==
- Mitchell, Charles P. The Great Composers Portrayed on Film, 1913 through 2002. McFarland, 2004.
