= Elina Labourdette =

French actress (1919–2014)

Élina Labourdette
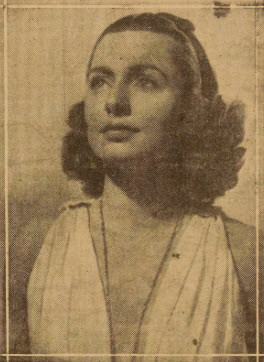
- Born: 21 May 1919; Paris, France
- Died: 30 September 2014 (aged 95); Le Mesnil-le-Roi, Yvelines, France
- Other name: Élina Janine Alice Henri-Labourdette
- Occupation: Actress
- Years active: 1938–1983
- Known for: Les Dames du Bois de Boulogne (1945); Edward and Caroline (1951)
- Spouse: Louis Pauwels (m. 1956; died 1997)
- Children: 1

Élina Labourdette (born Élina Janine Alice Henri-Labourdette, 21 May 1919 – 30 September 2014) was a French actress. Her career consisted mostly of flirtatious coquette roles on stage and screen. She is best known for her performances in Robert Bresson's Les Dames du Bois de Boulogne (1945) and in Jacques Becker's Edward and Caroline (1951).

== Biography ==
Élina Labourdette was born on 21 May 1919 in the 16th arrondissement of Paris. The daughter of the renowned coachbuilder and automobile designer Jean Henri-Labourdette, Élina at first wanted to be a dancer, before having to give up her dream of becoming a prima ballerina for health reasons. She learned rhythmic dance with Irène Popard and classical dance with Alexandre Volinine. During her school years, she took her first acting lessons with the actress Ève Francis. In 1938 at the age of nineteen, she made her first film The Shanghai Drama, directed by Georg Wilhelm Pabst. She then spent six months in England where, in addition to learning English, she took theatre and singing lessons. René Clair made her the teacher heroine of his film Air pur but the Second World War stopped the project. In 1944, towards the end of the war, she appeared in Les Dames du Bois de Boulogne directed by Robert Bresson, the film for which she became famous and remains best known. She played, with subtlety and great modernity, a cabaret dancer who has become a prostitute and is manipulated by a woman wishing to take revenge on a lover who rejected her, by throwing him into the arms of the dancer.

In 1950, Labourdette joined the theatre company of Madeleine Renaud and Jean-Louis Barrault, with whom she performed alongside her film career. She also did dubbing, notably lending her voice to Grace Kelly in the French versions of John Ford's Mogambo (1953) and Alfred Hitchcock's To Catch a Thief (1955). In 1956 she acted under the direction of Jean Renoir in Elena and Her Men, alongside Ingrid Bergman and Jean Marais. In 1961, she played a notable supporting role in Lola, Jacques Demy's first feature film. Her cinema film career ended with Le Clair de terre, a 1970 film by filmmaker Guy Gilles. From the end of the 1950s, she appeared several times in French soap operas and television films, including the popular Les Cousins de la Constance.

During her career, Labourdette worked for several notable directors, including G. W. Pabst, René Clair, Robert Bresson, René Clément, Jacques Becker, Gilles Grangier, Jean-Paul Le Chanois, Jean Renoir, and André Cayatte.

She was the second wife of journalist and writer Louis Pauwels from 1956 until his death in 1997. In 1961, they adopted a daughter, Zoé.

Labourdette died on 30 September 2014 in Le Mesnil-le-Roi, Yvelines, aged 95.

== Filmography ==
Year	Title	Role	Notes
1938	Prison sans barreaux		Uncredited
1938	The Shanghai Drama	Vera Blonski	
1941	The Pavilion Burns	Denise	
1943	Des jeunes filles dans la nuit	Germaine	
1945	Les Dames du Bois de Boulogne	Agnès	
1947	Les trafiquants de la mer	Hélène	
1950	The Adventurers of the Air	Gisèle Lesieur	
1950	The Glass Castle	Marion	
1951	Edward and Caroline	Florence Borch de Martelie	
1951	Monsieur Fabre	Countess de La Tour	
1951	Tapage nocturne	Caroline, the secretary	
1952	The Case Against X	Catherine Villard	
1952	My Husband Is Marvelous	Micheline	
1953	Rhine Virgin	Geneviève Labbé	
1955	To Paris with Love	Sylvia Gilbert	
1955	Papa, maman, ma femme et moi	Marguerite, the florist	
1956	It Happened in Aden	Simone	
1956	Elena and Her Men	Paulette Escoffier	
1957	The Truth About Women	Countess	
1960	The Night of Suspects	Gaby Farnoux	
1961	Lola	Mme Desnoyers	
1961	Vacances en enfer	Mme Martel	
1962	Tales of Paris	Jacqueline	(segment "Sophie")
1962	Snobs !	Mme de Saint-Aigne	
1962	Five Miles to Midnight	Mme. Lafont	
1962	Le Glaive et la balance	Simone Darbon	
1968	Au pan coupé	Owner of the Au pan coupé bar	
1968	The Young Wolves	Mme Sinclair	
1970	Le Clair de terre	Woman guide	

== Television ==
Year	Title	Role	Notes
1958	La Répétition ou l'Amour puni	Hortensia	Film by Jean-Paul Carrère
1960	Les Cinq Dernières Minutes (series)	Jacqueline Masserey	Season 1, episode 16: Dernier cri by Claude Loursais
1964	La Cousine Bette	Baroness Adeline Hulot d'Ervy	Film by Yves-André Hubert
1967	Julie de Chaverny ou la Double Méprise	Mme Lambert	Film by Jean-Pierre Marchand
1973	Un grand amour de Balzac	Laure de Berny	Series
1974	Président Faust	Cathy Faust	Film by Jean Kerchbron
1974	Julie Charles	Mme de Lamartine	Film by Jean Kerchbron
1974	Les Jardins du roi	Madeleine Vaindrier	Film by Jean Kerchbron
1975	Monsieur Jadis	The mother	Film by Michel Polac
1976	Anne, jour après jour	Espérance	Series by Bernard Toublanc-Michel
1978	Allégra	Vanina	Film by Michel Wyn
1979	Les Moyens du bord	Évelyne	Film by Bernard Toublanc-Michel
1979	Cinéma 16 (series)	Clémence Lavaronnière	Episode L'Œil du sorcier by Alain Dhénaut
1978	Les Jeunes Filles	Mme Dandillot	Film by Lazare Iglésis
1981	Le Piège à loups	Aunt Jo	Film
1983	Deux amies d'enfance		

== Bibliography ==
- Reader, Keith (15 June 2000). Robert Bresson (French Film Directors Series). Manchester University Press. ISBN 978-0719053658.
