= Edward and Caroline =

1951 film

- Film poster
- Directed by: Jacques Becker
- Written by: Jacques Becker; Annette Wademant
- Produced by: Raymond Borderie
- Starring: Daniel Gélin; Anne Vernon; Elina Labourdette
- Cinematography: Robert Lefebvre
- Edited by: Marguerite Renoir
- Music by: Jean-Jacques Grünenwald
- Production company: Union Générale Cinématographique
- Distributed by: L'Alliance Générale de Distribution Cinématographique
- Release date: 6 April 1951
- Running time: 88 minutes
- Country: France
- Language: French

Edward and Caroline (French: Édouard et Caroline) is a 1951 French comedy drama film directed by Jacques Becker and starring Daniel Gélin, Anne Vernon and Elina Labourdette. It was entered into the 1951 Cannes Film Festival. It was shot at the Billancourt Studios in Paris. The film's sets were designed by the art director Jacques Colombier.

== Plot ==
Édouard and Caroline are preparing for an important social gathering at her uncle's apartment during which Édouard will be expected to play the piano and impress the guests. Lacking a waistcoat Édouard goes to borrow one from his wife's cousin. In the meantime, Caroline attempts to re-model her dress to bring it more up-to-date. Her husband is not pleased and the evening consists of rows, fights and threats of divorce. It is the early morning before life returns to normal.

== Cast ==
- Daniel Gélin as Édouard Mortier
- Anne Vernon as Caroline Mortier
- Elina Labourdette as Florence Borch de Martelie
- Jacques François as Alain Beauchamp
- Betty Stockfeld as Lucy Barville
- Jean Galland as Claude Beauchamp
- Jean Marsac as a guest
- William Tubbs as Spencer Borch
- Jean Toulout as Herbert Barville
- Yette Lucas as Mme Leroy, the concierge
- Jean Riveyre as Julien, the Beauchamp butler
- Hélène Duc as the artistic guest
- Micheline Rolla as a guest
- Edmond Ardisson as the hairdresser
- Grégoire Gromoff as Igor
