= Marguerite Renoir =

French film editor

- Born: Marguerite Houllé; 22 July 1906; Paris, France
- Died: 12 July 1987 (aged 80); Vigneux-sur-Seine, France
- Other name: Marguerite Houllé
- Occupation: Editor
- Years active: 1929–1972
- Partner: Jean Renoir

Marguerite Renoir (born Marguerite Houllé) was a French film editor who worked on more than 60 films during her career. For many years, she and director Jean Renoir were lovers, and she edited many of his films. Although she and Renoir never married, she took his surname. She was a supporter of the French Communist Party.

== Selected filmography ==
- Le Bled (1929)
- The Blaireau Case (1932)
- Night at the Crossroads (1932)
- Chotard and Company (1933)
- Madame Bovary (1934)
- Toni (1935)
- The Mysteries of Paris (1935)
- Koenigsmark (1935)
- Partie de campagne (1936)
- White Cargo (1937)
- Cristobal's Gold (1940)
- The Trump Card (1942)
- Colonel Chabert (1943)
- Paris Frills (1945)
- The Sea Rose (1946)
- Antoine and Antoinette (1947)
- The Adventurers of the Air (1950)
- Edward and Caroline (1951)
- Heart of the Casbah (1952)
- The Love of a Woman (1953)
- Ali Baba and the Forty Thieves (1954)
- The Crucible (1957)
- Solo (1970)

== Bibliography ==
- Perez, Gilberto. The Material Ghost: Films and Their Medium. JHU Press, 2000.
