= Jacques Dynam =

French actor (1923–2004)

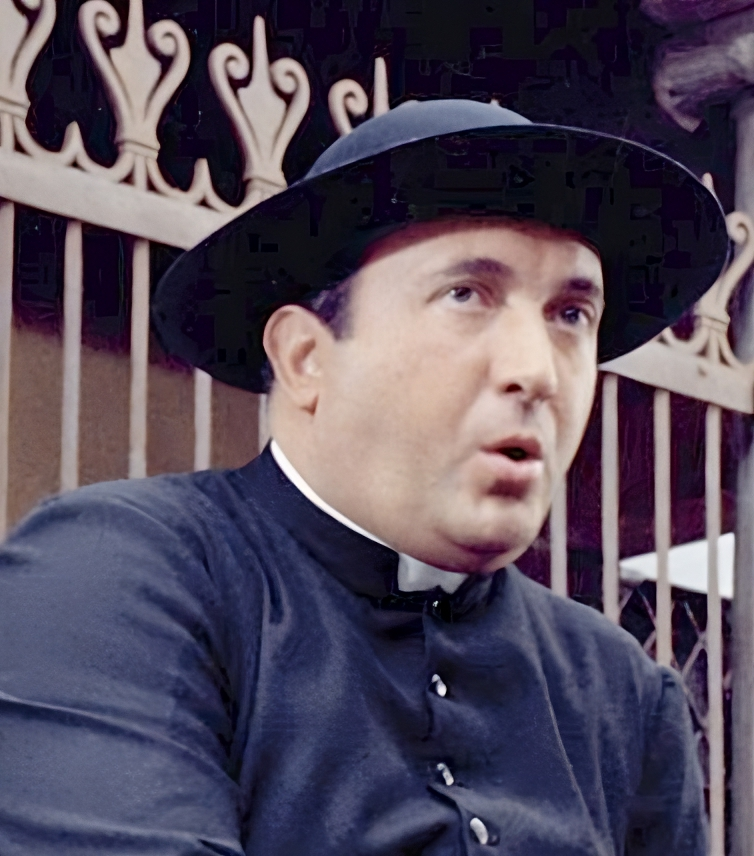
- Jacques Dynam
- Born: 30 December 1923; Montrouge, France
- Died: 11 November 2004 (aged 80); Paris, France
- Occupation: Actor
- Years active: 1942–2004

Jacques Dynam (30 December 1923 – 11 November 2004) was a French film actor. He appeared in more than 150 films between 1942 and 2004, among which the Fantomas saga.

== Selected filmography ==
- La symphonie fantastique (1942) - (uncredited)
- The Angel of the Night (1944) - Un étudiant (uncredited)
- Les Petites du quai aux fleurs (1944) - Paulo
- La Boîte aux rêves (1945) - Petit rôle (uncredited)
- Alone in the Night (1945) - Le chasseur
- Lunegarde (1946)
- Dawn Devils (1946) - Gauthier
- The Ideal Couple (1946)
- Fantômas (1947) - Un préparateur
- Le diamant de cent sous (1948) - Georges
- 3ème cheminée sur la gauche (1948)
- La figure de proue (1948) - Lomond
- Scandal (1948)
- Toute la famille était là (1948) - Gaston
- Manon (1949) - Un marin (uncredited)
- Doctor Laennec (1949) - Meriadec
- Barry (1949) - Le moine Claudius
- Vient de paraître (1949) - Un journaliste
- Millionaires for One Day (1949) - Michel
- Amour et compagnie (1950) - Le marin
- The Ferret (1950) - Pierre
- Death Threat (1950) - Pierre
- The Paris Waltz (1950) - Le calife de Ramsoun
- Tuesday's Guest (1950) - Jean Gompers
- Women Are Crazy (1950) - Le cousin Fernand
- Just Me (1950) - Jacques Turpin
- Without Leaving an Address (1951) - Un photographe
- My Seal and Them (1951) - Un livreur
- La passante (1951) - Le poinçonneur
- La vie est un jeu (1951)
- The Night Is My Kingdom (1951) - Jean Gaillard
- Come Down, Someone Wants You (1951) - Gilbert
- My Wife Is Formidable (1951) - Francis Germain
- Duel in Dakar (1951) - Reinard
- Massacre in Lace (1952) - Pablo le Bègue
- The Damned Lovers (1952) - Raoul
- Allô... je t'aime (1952) - Gilbert Pujol
- Judgement of God (1952) - Un soldat (uncredited)
- Desperate Decision (1952) - Le consommateur
- My Husband Is Marvelous (1952) - L'efféminé
- Les amours finissent à l'aube (1953) - Inspecteur Sennac
- Quay of Blondes (1954) - Dominique
- Mam'zelle Nitouche (1954) - Le premier réserviste (uncredited)
- Le Secret d'Hélène Marimon (1954) - Galdou
- Le collège en folie (1954)
- Cadet Rousselle (1954) - L'aubergiste des Trois Grâces
- Yours Truly, Blake (1954) - Gaston
- Pas de souris dans le business (1955)
- House on the Waterfront (1955) - Le Meur
- L'impossible Monsieur Pipelet (1955) - Monsieur Durand, un futur père
- Madelon (1955) - Le chasseur de chez Maxim's
- Pas de pitié pour les caves (1955) - Jo
- On déménage le colonel (1955) - Clotaire
- La fierecilla domada (1956) - Florindo
- In the Manner of Sherlock Holmes (1956) - Assistant
- Crime and Punishment (1956) - Le client de Madame Horvais (uncredited)
- Que les hommes sont bêtes (1957)
- L'auberge en folie (1957) - Gustave
- Vacances explosives! (1957) - Le camionneur
- La polka des menottes (1957) - Le chauffeur du camion
- C'est une fille de Paname (1957)
- Marchands de filles (1957) - Mister Jean
- Le Souffle du désir (1958) - Jacques
- Les femmes sont marrantes (1958) - Max
- Prisons de femmes (1958) - Le médecin
- Taxi, Roulotte et Corrida (1958) - Pedro, le premier bandit
- Les Jeux dangereux (1958) - Dédé - le chauffeur
- The Gendarme of Champignol (1959) - Le gendarme Ratinet
- The Count of Monte Cristo (1961)
- Seul... à corps perdu (1963)
- The Bamboo Stroke (1963)
- Carom Shots (1963) - Macheron
- Maigret Sees Red (1963) - Un inspecteur
- Cherchez l'idole (1964) - Le routier
- Comment trouvez-vous ma soeur? (1964)
- Une ravissante idiote (1964) - Le sergent de police
- Une souris chez les hommes (1964) - Le patron du café (uncredited)
- Male Hunt (1964) - Un truand
- Male Companion (1964) - Le père d'Isabelle / Isabelle's Father
- Fantômas (1964) - L'inspecteur Bertrand
- The Sleeping Car Murders (1965) - Un inspecteur
- When the Pheasants Pass (1965) - Le chauffeur de Ribero
- Diamonds Are Brittle (1965) - Le commissaire
- Fantômas se déchaîne (1965) - Bertrand
- Le Grand Restaurant (1966) - Un serveur
- Fantômas contre Scotland Yard (1967) - Bertrand
- L'Homme qui valait des milliards (1967) - Loulou
- Les Têtes brûlées (1967) - Sosto
- Les grandes vacances (1967) - Croizac, le livreur de charbon
- Les risques du métier (1967) - L'inspecteur de police Michaux
- A Strange Kind of Colonel (1968) - Policeman
- Faites donc plaisir aux amis (1969) - Robert Garaudet
- The Little Theatre of Jean Renoir (1970, TV Movie) - Jules, le second mari / The Second Husband (segment "La cireuse électrique")
- Le Soldat Laforêt (1972) - L'homme en exode
- Dany la ravageuse (1972) - Hearse Driver
- Les grands sentiments font les bons gueuletons (1973) - Alphonse Neyrac
- The Four Charlots Musketeers (1974) - L'aubergiste
- La gueule de l'emploi (1974) - Le second déménageur
- La Grande Nouba (1974) - Le chef de la sécurité
- The Four Charlots Musketeers 2 (1974) - L'aubergiste
- French Connection II (1975) - Inspector Genevoix
- The Smurfs and the Magic Flute (1976) - Mortaille (voice)
- Parisian Life (1977) - Prosper
- Ne pleure pas (1978) - Commissaire Duplantier
- The Associate (1979) - Mathivet
- Womanlight (1979) - Le taxi malaimable
- Julien Fontanes, magistrat (1980-1981, TV Series) - Panavier / Léon Boueix
- Qu'est-ce qui fait craquer les filles... (1982) - The hotel janitor
- Le Braconnier de Dieu (1983) - Le brigadier
- One Deadly Summer (1983) - Ferraldo - le patron d'une entreprise de transports
- Tranches de vie (1985) - Alex, le restaurateur
- Bonjour l'angoisse (1988) - Patron de café 2
- The Super Mario Bros. Super Show! (1989, TV Series) - (voice)
- Madame Bovary (1991) - L' abbé Bournisien
- Chômeurs mais on s'soigne (1998)
- The Children of the Marshland (1999)
- Le monde de Marty (2000) - Charles Dancourt
- Fanfan la Tulipe (2003) - Chaville
- L'antidote (2005) - Le propriétaire de l'usine de jouets
