= Millionaires for One Day =

1949 film

- Directed by: André Hunebelle
- Written by: Alex Joffé; Jean Halain
- Produced by: André Hunebelle
- Starring: Gaby Morlay; Jean Brochard; Ginette Leclerc
- Cinematography: Marcel Grignon
- Edited by: Jean Feyte
- Music by: Jean Marion
- Production companies: Pathé Consortium Cinéma; Production Artistique et Cinématographique
- Distributed by: Pathé Consortium Cinéma
- Release date: 13 December 1949
- Running time: 82 minutes
- Country: France
- Language: French

Millionaires for One Day (French: Millionnaires d'un jour) is a 1949 French comedy film directed by André Hunebelle and starring Gaby Morlay, Jean Brochard and Ginette Leclerc. It was shot at the Francoeur Studios in Paris. The film's sets were designed by the art director Lucien Carré. It was produced and distributed by Pathé.

== Synopsis ==
Due to an error printed in a newspaper, a number of people wrongly believe they have won the lottery. When the mistake is revealed, it transpires that they are all better off anyway.

== Cast ==
- Gaby Morlay as Hélène Berger, Pierre's wife
- Jean Brochard as Pierre Berger, Hélène's husband
- Ginette Leclerc as Greta Schmidt
- Pierre Brasseur as Francis, the gangster
- Yves Deniaud as Antoine Bergas
- André Valmy as Marcel, an accomplice of Francis
- André Gabriello as Le maire de Villeneuve
- Bernard Lajarrige as Philippe Dubreuil, journalist
- Pierre Larquey as Jules Martin
- Louis de Funès as Philippe's advocate
- Edmond Ardisson as Le directeur
- Antoine Balpêtré as Toubib
- Jacques Baumer as The Judge
- Léon Belières as Jules Flamand
- Paul Demange as Le collègue de Pierre Berger
- Pierre Destailles as Le cafetier
- Jeanne Fusier-Gir as Louise
- Max Révol as Jules,
- Madeleine Barbulée as L'infirmière
- Georges Bréhat as Un avocat
- Lucien Callamand as Le ministre
- Monique Darbaud as Sylvie Dubreuil
- Jacques Dynam as Michel
- Sylvie Pelayo as Sylvia
- Germaine Reuver as La vendeuse
- Robert Noël as Un complice

== Bibliography ==
- Bonnotte, Stéphane. Louis de Funès: jusqu'au bout du rire. Lafon, 2002.
- Kermabon, Jacques. Pathé: premier empire du cinéma. Centre Georges Pompidou, 1994.
