= The Case Against X =

1952 film

- Directed by: Richard Pottier
- Written by: René Floriot; Marc-Gilbert Sauvajon
- Produced by: François Chavane; Marius Franay; Alain Poiré
- Starring: Yves Deniaud; Elina Labourdette; Yves Vincent
- Cinematography: Maurice Barry
- Edited by: Jean Feyte
- Music by: Marc Lanjean
- Production companies: Cinéphonic; Gaumont
- Distributed by: Gaumont Distribution
- Release date: 11 June 1952
- Running time: 100 minutes
- Country: France
- Language: French

The Case Against X (French: Ouvert contre X) is a 1952 French crime thriller film directed by Richard Pottier and starring Yves Deniaud, Elina Labourdette and Yves Vincent. It was shot at the Saint-Maurice Studios in Paris and on location in the city. The film's sets were designed by the art director Lucien Carré.

== Synopsis ==
A wealthy industrialist is murdered at his residence, and suspicion falls on his mistress Catherine. The experienced Chief Inspector Bonnardel is convinced of her guilt and arrests her, but his younger colleague Inspector Richard is less convinced and searches for the real culprit.

== Cast ==
- Yves Deniaud as L'inspecteur-chef Bonnardel
- Elina Labourdette as Catherine Villard
- Yves Vincent as L'inspecteur Richard
- Jean Debucourt as Maître Landry
- Marcel André as Le médecin légiste
- Marie Déa as Madame Le Mesles
- Charles Dechamps as Le juge d'instruction Ferrand
- Marthe Mercadier as La détenue-manucure
- Henri Nassiet as L'industriel Paul Dorgères
- María Riquelme as Etiennette - la concierge
- Guy Decomble as Le concierge
- Robert Dalban as L'inspecteur Sylvestre
- Jean Barrère as Pierre
- Charles Vissièresas Le détective Henri Bouteiller
- Marcel Delaître as Le commissaire
- Michel Etcheverry as Bertrand Moal
- Fernand René as Le tailleur
- Paul Villé as Le maître d'hôtel
- Julien Maffre as L'hôtelier
- Zélie Yzelle as La cuisinière
- Madeleine Barbulée as La voisine
- Myriam Bru as La nièce
- Jacqueline Huet as La vendeuse
- Odette Barencey as Une femme
- Henri Crémieux as Phalempeau
- Nadine Tallier as Amélie - la soubrette
- Alfred Adam as Le vendeur de boutons

== Bibliography ==
- Rège, Philippe. Encyclopedia of French Film Directors, Volume 1. Scarecrow Press, 2009.
