= Charles Vissières =

French actor (1880–1960)

- Born: 30 October 1880; Caen, Calvados, France
- Died: 13 April 1960 (aged 79); Couilly-Pont-aux-Dames, Seine-et-Marne, France
- Occupation: Actor
- Years active: 1935-1958 (film)

Charles Vissières (1880–1960) was a French stage and film actor. A character actor, he appeared in supporting roles in films from the mid-1930s onwards.

== Selected filmography ==
- Sacred Woods (1939)
- Love Cavalcade (1940)
- The Last of the Six (1941)
- The Angel They Gave Me (1946)
- The Idiot (1946)
- Clockface Café (1947)
- The Lost Village (1947)
- Not Guilty (1947)
- Dilemma of Two Angels (1948)
- Convicted (1948)
- Monelle (1948)
- The Spice of Life (1948)
- Suzanne and the Robbers (1949)
- Doctor Laennec (1949)
- Old Boys of Saint-Loup (1950)
- Rue des Saussaies (1951)
- Women Are Angels (1952)
- The Case Against X (1952)
- The Road to Damascus (1952)
- My Husband Is Marvelous (1952)
- The Return of Don Camillo (1953)

== Bibliography ==
- Bessy, Maurice & Chirat, Raymond. Histoire du cinéma français: 1951-1955. Pygmalion, 1989.
- Biggs, Melissa E. French films, 1945-1993: a critical filmography of the 400 most important releases. McFarland & Company, 1996.
- Laura, Ernesto G. Tutti i film di Venezia, 1932–1984. La Biennale, Settore cinema e spettacolo televisivo, 1985.
