= Cadet Rousselle (film) =

1954 film

- Directed by: André Hunebelle
- Written by: Jean Halain; Jean-Paul Lacroix
- Produced by: René Bezard; Pierre Cabaud; Paul Cadéac; André Hunebelle; Adrien Remaugé
- Starring: François Périer; Dany Robin; Madeleine Lebeau
- Cinematography: Marcel Grignon
- Edited by: Jean Feyte
- Music by: Jean Marion
- Production companies: Production Artistique et Cinématographique; Pathé Production
- Distributed by: Pathé Consortium Cinéma
- Release date: 20 October 1954
- Running time: 105 minutes
- Country: France
- Language: French

Cadet Rousselle is a 1954 French comedy adventure film directed by André Hunebelle and starring François Périer, Dany Robin and Madeleine Lebeau. It was shot in Eastmancolor at the Francoeur Studios in Paris and on location in Nemours, Saint-Yon and Égreville. The film's sets were designed by the art director Lucien Carré. It takes its title from a traditional song of the same title. It was a popular success in France, attracting four million spectators.

== Synopsis ==
After a fight, cadet Rousselle is forced to leave his hometown and sets out for Paris. On the way he has several adventures, including being attacked by highwaymen. He encounters a group of touring actors who, unknown to him, are Royalist agents committed to overturning the French Revolution and he soon finds himself embroiled in danger.

== Cast ==
- François Périer as Cadet Rousselle
- Dany Robin as Violetta Carlino
- Bourvil as Jérôme Baguindet
- Madeleine Lebeau as Marguerite de Beaufort
- Christine Carère as Isabelle
- Noël Roquevert as Le commissaire Berton
- Jean Parédès as Le général
- Henri Crémieux as Le maire
- Alfred Adam as Ravignol
- Pierre Destailles as Rouget de Lisle
- Louis Arbessier as Le tribun
- Jacques Dufilho as Carlos
- René Génin as Le curé
- Jacques Dynam as L'aubergiste des Trois Grâces
- Jacques Fabbri as Le colonel
- Jean-Louis Jemma as Bonaparte
- Marcel Pérès as Martin
- Charles Bouillaud as Un colonel
- Louis Bugette as Un gardien de prison
- Anne Carrère as Une invitée chez le maire
- Joé Davray as Arlequin
- Isabelle Eber as L'allumeuse
- Giani Esposito as Monseigneur
- Françoise Favier as Marinette Duval -la serveuse des Trois Grâces
- Lucien Guervil as Le deuxième gardien de prison
- Marcelle Hainia as La dame en diligence
- Guy Henry as Atlas
- Corinne Marchand as Une danseuse orientale

== Bibliography ==
- Hayward, Susan. French Costume Drama of the 1950s: Fashioning Politics in Film. Intellect Books, 2010.
- Rège, Philippe. Encyclopedia of French Film Directors, Volume 1. Scarecrow Press, 2009.
