= Madeleine Barbulée =

French actress (1910–2001)

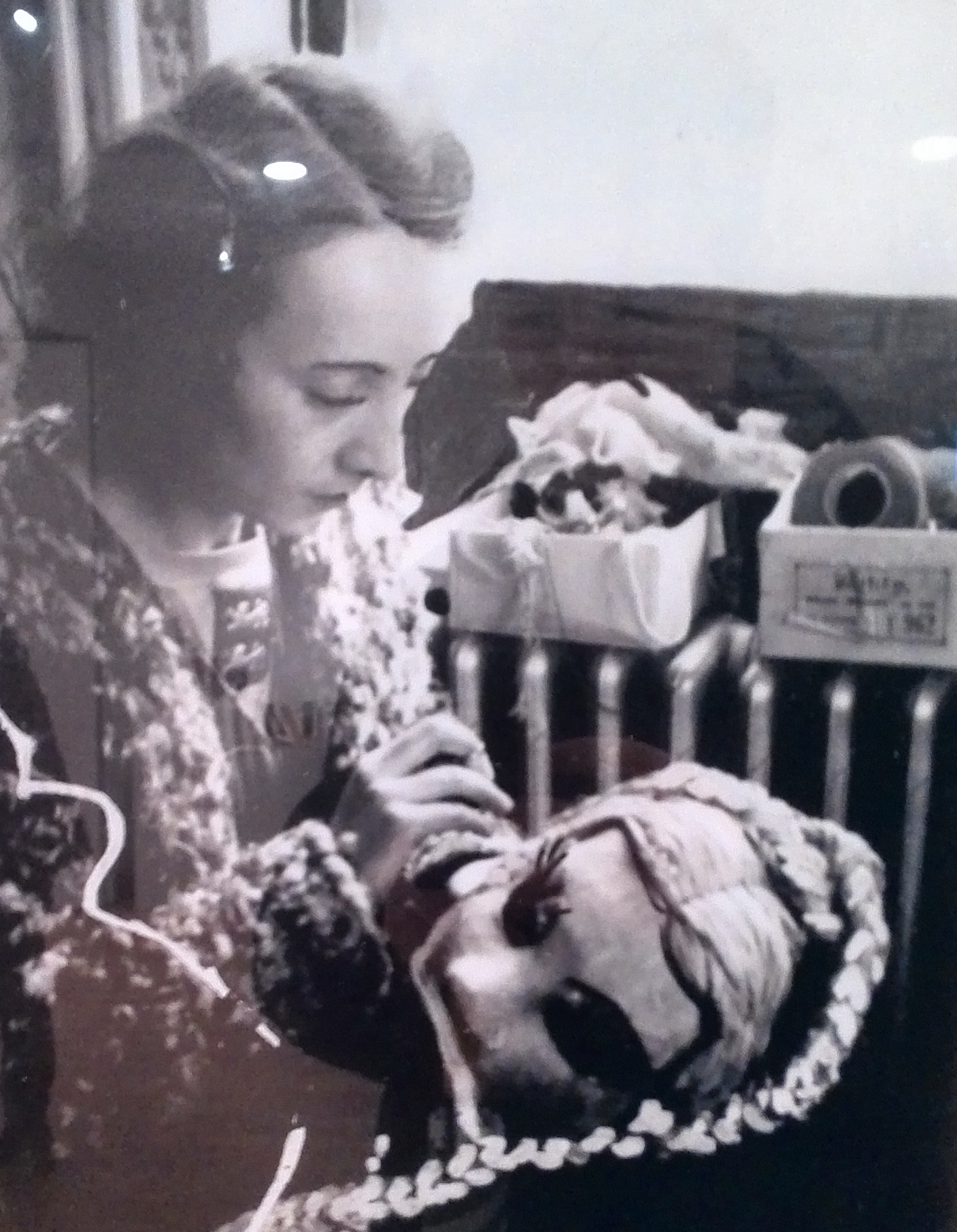
- in 1940s.
- Born: 2 September 1910; Nancy, Lorraine, France
- Died: 1 January 2001 (aged 90); Paris, France
- Occupation: Actress
- Years active: 1948–2000 (film & TV)

Madeleine Barbulée (2 September 1910 – 1 January 2001) was a French film, stage and television actress.

== Selected filmography ==
- Métier de fous (1948)
- The Spice of Life (1948) - La chanteuse
- White Paws (1949) - La cousine (uncredited)
- Mission in Tangier (1949) - Une dactylo du journal
- The Mystery of the Yellow Room (1949) - La femme de chambre
- Return to Life (1949) - (segment 5 : Le retour de Louis") (uncredited)
- Cage of Girls (1949) - Une surveillante
- Millionaires for One Day (1949) - L'infirmière
- Rome Express (1950) - La libraire
- Prélude à la gloire (1950) - Mademoiselle Duchemin
- Le tampon du capiston (1950) - Une invitée
- Le gang des tractions-arrière (1950)
- Beware of Blondes (1950) - Mme Dubois
- Without Leaving an Address (1951) - La marchande de jouets de la gare (uncredited)
- Darling Caroline (1951) - Mme de Tourville, la gouvernante
- Dr. Knock (1951) - Une infirmière (uncredited)
- The Strange Madame X (1951) - Marthe (uncredited)
- Beautiful Love (1951) - L'assistante du docteur Moulin
- La vie chantée (1951) - La maman
- The Voyage to America (1951) - L'économe
- The Most Beautiful Girl in the World (1951) - La secrétaire de l'agence
- Two Pennies Worth of Violets (1951) - La chanteuse des rues
- Great Man (1951) - Marie-Laure
- The Seven Deadly Sins (1952) - La secrétaire céleste (segment "Paresse, La / Sloth")
- Forbidden Games (1952) - Une soeur de la Croix-Rouge
- Matrimonial Agency (1952) - Céline
- The Case Against X (1952) - La voisine
- Trois femmes (1952)
- Monsieur Taxi (1952) - La tricoteuse
- Beauties of the Night (1952) - La femme au bureau de poste / Woman in post office (uncredited)
- Desperate Decision (1952) - La voyageuse
- My Husband Is Marvelous (1952)
- Deux de l'escadrille (1953)
- Follow That Man (1953) - Mme Durbain - la concierge
- Mandat d'amener (1953) - La femme du juge
- The Earrings of Madame de… (1953) - Une amie de Madame de... (uncredited)
- Thérèse Raquin (1953) - Madame Noblet, une cliente
- Zoé (1954)
- After You Duchess (1954)
- Papa, Mama, the Maid and I (1955) - Marie-Louise, la première bonne
- Casse-cou, mademoiselle! (1955)
- Papa, maman, ma femme et moi (1955) - Une collègue de Fernand
- Le dossier noir (1955) - La soeur du procureur
- Frou-Frou (1955) - Berthe, l'habilleuse
- Blackmail (1955) - L'infirmière
- Les aristocrates (1955) - L'hôtelière
- The Grand Maneuver (1955) - La dame au chapeau jaune
- The French, They Are a Funny Race (1955) - La femme de chambre
- Thirteen at the Table (1955) - (uncredited)
- La Bande à papa (1956) - Mme Merlerin
- Marie Antoinette Queen of France (1956) - Mme Sophie (uncredited)
- Mannequins of Paris (1956)) - Madame Madeleine - la première
- Plucking the Daisy (1956) - Madame Dumont
- Les lumières du soir (1956) - L'assistante sociale
- The Hunchback of Notre Dame (1956) - Madame Outarde
- I'll Get Back to Kandara (1956) - Madame Lachaume
- Les Collégiennes (1957) - Madame Letellier, la principale
- Sénéchal the Magnificent (1957) - Mme Roberte
- C'est une fille de Paname (1957)
- Quand la femme s'en mêle (1957) - La pâtissière
- In Case of Adversity (1958) - La cliente de la boucherie
- Les Misérables (1958) - Soeur Simplice
- Neither Seen Nor Recognized (1958) - Madame Chaville
- Love Is My Profession (1958) - Bordenave
- Le petit prof (1959) - La veuve Mouriot
- Guinguette (1959) - La femme de Monsieur Jean
- Gangster Boss (1959) - Mme. Rivoire (uncredited)
- La bête à l'affût (1959) - Maria
- Soupe au lait (1959)
- Les affreux (1959) - La secrétaire
- Détournement de mineur (1960) - Christine's Mother
- Murder at 45 R.P.M. (1960) - La secrètaire
- La brune que voilà (1960) - Madame Sivelle - la gouvernante
- Coctail party (1960) - Julia Shuttlethwaite
- Les Tortillards (1960) - Adélaïde Benoît
- Un chien dans un jeu de quilles (1962) - La mère
- The Mysteries of Paris (1962) - Mme Godin
- La foire aux cancres (Chronique d'une année scolaire) (1963)
- Cent briques et des tuiles (1965) - Limonade
- Le dimanche de la vie (1967) - Madame Faucolle
- Pierre et Paul (1969) - Mathilde
- La maison des Bories (1970) - Mlle Estienne
- The Day of the Jackal (1973) - Hotel Guest (uncredited)
- A Slightly Pregnant Man (1973) - Mlle Janvier
- Le cri du coeur (1974) - Berthe / maid
- Incorrigible (1975) - La dame-pipi
- L'Avare (1980) - La mère de Marianne
- Les Séducteurs (1980) - Mamie (segment "The French Method")
- Banzaï (1983) - Vieille dame avion
- Vous habitez chez vos parents? (1983) - Mammy
- La 7ème cible (1984) - L'antiquaire aux puces
- La messe en si mineur (1990) - Madame Lopez
- Roulez jeunesse! (1993) - Lise

== Bibliography ==
- Alison Smith. French Cinema in the 1970s: The Echoes of May. Manchester University Press, 2005.
