= My Husband Is Marvelous =

1952 film

- Directed by: André Hunebelle
- Written by: Jean Halain
- Produced by: André Hunebelle
- Starring: Fernand Gravey; Sophie Desmarets; Elina Labourdette
- Cinematography: Marcel Grignon
- Edited by: Jean Feyte
- Music by: Jean Marion
- Production company: P.A.C.
- Distributed by: Pathé Consortium Cinéma
- Release date: 1952
- Running time: 95 minutes
- Country: France
- Language: French

My Husband Is Marvelous (French: Mon mari est merveilleux) is a 1952 French comedy film directed by André Hunebelle and starring Fernand Gravey, Sophie Desmarets and Elina Labourdette. The film's sets were designed by the art director Lucien Carré. While a follow-up to the 1951 film My Wife Is Formidable which had the same director and cast, it is not a sequel.

== Synopsis ==
Sylvia, a journalist, tries to uses subterfuge in order to gain an interview with Claude a writer who tries to maintain a reclusive, misanthropic image.

== Cast ==
- Fernand Gravey as Claude Chatel
- Sophie Desmarets as Sylvia Corbier
- Elina Labourdette as Micheline
- Jacques Dynam as L'efféminé
- Mady Berry as Germaine
- Anne Carrère as La snob
- Made Siamé as La vieille dame
- Pierre Larquey as Le père Henri
- Jacques Castelot as Christian
- Georgette Anys as L'aubergiste
- Henri Arius as Le patron du bistrot
- Madeleine Barbulée
- Charles Bouillaud
- Louis Bugette as Roger
- Gérard Buhr
- Lucien Callamand as Un ami
- José Casa
- Simone Chambord
- Paul Clérouc as Le valet
- Paul Demange as Basset
- Pierre Duverger
- Giani Esposito as Un journaliste
- Paul Faivre as Le rédacteur en chef
- Lucien Frégis
- Claude Garbe
- Julien Maffre
- Judith Magre
- Mauricet as Le ministre
- Ida Montagne
- Georges Spanelly
- Charles Vissières as Le membre de l'institut

== Bibliography ==
- Philippe Rège. Encyclopedia of French Film Directors, Volume 1. Scarecrow Press, 2009.
