= The Adventurers of the Air =

1950 film

- Directed by: René Jayet
- Written by: Robert Bibal
- Produced by: René Jayet
- Starring: Ginette Leclerc; Elina Labourdette; Yves Furet
- Cinematography: Marcel Villet
- Edited by: Marguerite Renoir
- Music by: Jean Yatove
- Production companies: Réalisations Cinématographiques Musicales; Jad Films
- Distributed by: Héraut Film
- Release date: 20 October 1950
- Running time: 80 minutes
- Country: France
- Language: French

The Adventurers of the Air (French: Les aventuriers de l'air) is a 1950 French crime adventure film directed by René Jayet and starring Ginette Leclerc, Elina Labourdette and Yves Furet. The film's sets were designed by the art director Eugène Roman.

== Synopsis ==
A pilot and former Second World War hero signs a contract agreeing to carry cargo for a gang of criminals.

== Cast ==
- Ginette Leclerc as Béatrice Webb
- Elina Labourdette as Gisèle Lesieur
- Yves Furet as Pierre Lagarde
- Jean Murat as Portal
- Jean-Max as Christiani
- Antonin Berval as Docquois
- Dorette Ardenne as Odette
- Michel Lemoine as Traîne-savates
- Nicolas Amato as Le chauffeur
- Lucien Callamand as Le Guérec
- Raymond Galle as Bibi

== Bibliography ==
- Rège, Philippe. Encyclopedia of French Film Directors, Volume 1. Scarecrow Press, 2009.
- Sabria, Jean-Charles. ''Cinéma français: les années 50 : les longs métrages réalisés de 1950 à 1959. Éd. du Centre Pompidou, 1987.
