= Pierre Lherminier =

French cinematic historian (1931–2021)

- Born: Pierre Thévenet; 2 January 1931; Oullins, France
- Died: 25 January 2021 (aged 90)
- Occupation: Historian

Pierre Thévenet, known as Pierre Lherminier, (2 January 1931 – 25 January 2021) was a French cinematic historian and writer.

== Biography ==
Lherminier was the brother of film producer René Thévenet. He began working in cinema with his contributions to a French film encyclopedia. He became well-known when he became director of the "Cinéma d'aujourd'hui" collection, published by Éditions Seghers. He published "biofilms" about great French directors. It was released on 22 March 1962 and was commended by Le Film français. Jean Collet's segment on Jean-Luc Godard sold over 500,000 copies.

In 1968, he entered a film competition with the Institut des hautes études cinématographiques, but it was cancelled due to the events of May 68. In 1970, he left Seghers and joined Robert Laffont. Five years later, he became an independent publisher and reprised "Cinéma d'aujourd'hui" and created several other collections. When "Cinéma d'aujourd'hui" was re-released in 1979, it was once again hailed by critics in the Revue du cinéma. He stopped self-publishing in 1988 and joined upper management at Éditions des Quatre-Vents. He would sign several books and assist in the publishing of books by Jean Vigo and Louis Delluc. In 2012, he published the first volume of Annales du cinéma français. Critic Philippe Roger called it a "modest and ambitious" project which constitutes a "sum of intelligent erudition", and Laurent Aknin called it a "work of reference for all to order first". He became Editor-in-Chief of Présence du cinéma français and created the bookstore Contacts in 1955, which closed its doors in 2013.

In 1973, Lherminier founded the Comité de liaison de l'édition cinématographique, which organized a cinematic book fair in 1985, an event subsequently adopted by Cinémathique Française. He deposited his archives at the Institute for Contemporary Publishing Archives in 1996.

Pierre Lherminier died on 25 January 2021 at the age of 90.

== Works ==
- L'Art du cinéma (1960)
- Luis Buñuel (1964)
- Jean Vigo (1967)
- Cinéma 2000 (1974)
- Cinéma pleine page : l'édition cinématographique de langue française (1985)
- Chronique du cinéma (1992)
- Signoret, Montand : deux vies dans le siècle (2005)
- Jean Vigo, un cinéma singulier (2007)
- Louis Delluc et le cinéma français (2008)
- Annales du cinéma français : les voies du silence (1895-1929) (2012)
