= Thirteen at the Table =

1955 film

- Directed by: André Hunebelle
- Written by: Jean Halain
- Based on: Thirteen at the Table by Marc-Gilbert Sauvajon
- Produced by: Pierre Cabaud; Adrien Remaugé; René Thévenet
- Starring: Micheline Presle; Fernand Gravey; Germaine Montero
- Cinematography: Paul Cotteret
- Edited by: James Cuenet
- Music by: Jean Marion
- Production companies: Contact Organisation; Safia
- Distributed by: Pathé Consortium Cinéma
- Release date: 28 December 1955
- Running time: 92 minutes
- Country: France
- Language: French

Thirteen at the Table (French: Treize à table) is a 1955 French comedy film directed by André Hunebelle and starring Micheline Presle, Fernand Gravey and Germaine Montero. It was shot at the Francoeur Studios in Paris. The film's sets were designed by the art director Lucien Carré. It is based on the 1953 play of the same name by Marc-Gilbert Sauvajon.

== Synopsis ==
The superstitious Madeleine Villardier is trying to organise her New Year's Eve party, but despite her best efforts she manages to have an unlucky thirteen guests there that evening. In addition one of the thirteen, Consuelo, has evidence of her husband Antoine's past indiscretions in Latin America.

== Cast ==
- Micheline Presle as Madeleine Villardier
- Fernand Gravey as Antoine Villardier
- Germaine Montero as Consuelo Koukouwski
- Jean Brochard as Dr. Pelourzat
- Jeanne Fusier-Gir as La tante
- Max Révol as Frédéric
- Bernard La Jarrige as Raphaël
- Claude Nicot as Raymond Brelan - Le neveu
- Georgette Anys as Marie-Louise Taburot
- Paul Demange as Le pianiste
- Paul Faivre as Dupaillon
- Jacqueline Huet as Priscilla Wood
- Christiane Minazzoli as Henriette
- Jacques Sommet as Jean-Charles Chambon
- René Lefevre-Bel as Un invité
- Raymond Carl as L'oncle
- Yvonne Clermont
- Francis Roger
- Jacqueline Hopstein
- Maud Slover
- Annie Girardot as Véronique Chambon
- Mischa Auer as Badabof
- Madeleine Barbulée
- José Casa
- Jo Lecomte
- Yvonne Monlaur
- Tania Soucault

== Bibliography ==
- James Robert Parish. (1977) Film Actors Guide. Scarecrow Press.
