= Pierre Destailles =

French actor (1909–1990)

- Born: 16 May 1909; Paris, France
- Died: 31 March 1990 (aged 82); Yvelines, France
- Occupation: Actor
- Years active: 1946–1987 (film & TV)

Pierre Destailles (1909–1990) was a French film, stage and television actor. He was also a noted lyricist.

== Selected filmography ==
- Dropped from Heaven (1946)
- The Spice of Life (1948)
- Mission in Tangier (1949)
- Suzanne and the Robbers (1949)
- Brilliant Waltz (1949)
- Branquignol (1949)
- Millionaires for One Day (1949)
- Women Are Crazy (1950)
- The Atomic Monsieur Placido (1950)
- Beware of Blondes (1950)
- A Certain Mister (1950)
- My Wife Is Formidable (1951)
- Under the Sky of Paris (1951)
- Great Man (1951)
- The Voyage to America (1951)
- Légère et court vêtue (1953)
- The Knight of the Night (1953)
- Cadet Rousselle (1954)
- The Price of Love (1955)
- The Anodin Family (1956, TV series)
- And Your Sister? (1958)
- Guinguette (1959)
- Germinal (1963)
- Speak to Me of Love (1975)

== Bibliography ==
- Cenciarelli, Carlo, The Oxford Handbook of Cinematic Listening. Oxford University Press, 2021.
- Goble, Alan. The Complete Index to Literary Sources in Film. Walter de Gruyter, 1999.
