= Suzanne and the Robbers =

1949 film

- Directed by: Yves Ciampi
- Written by: Pierre Véry
- Starring: René Dary; Suzanne Flon; Pierre Destailles
- Cinematography: Léonce-Henri Burel
- Edited by: Jean Feyte
- Production company: Films Olympia
- Release date: 15 June 1949
- Running time: 76 minutes
- Country: France
- Language: French

Suzanne and the Robbers or Suzanne and Her Robbers (French: Suzanne et ses brigands) is a 1949 French comedy film directed by Yves Ciampi and featuring René Dary, Suzanne Flon and Pierre Destailles. The film's sets were designed by the art director Lucien Carré.

== Cast ==
- René Dary as René Seguin
- Suzanne Flon as Suzanne Seguin
- Pierre Destailles as L'aubergiste
- Antoine Balpêtré as Bevardel
- Louis Arbessier as Docteur Vinson
- Catherine Damet as Jeanne
- Marie Leduc as Mme Bavarde
- Jacques Sommet as Jean Lucas
- Andrée Spinelly as Lydia
- Charles Vissières as Beauregard

== Bibliography ==
- James Monaco. The Encyclopedia of Film. Perigee Books, 1991.
