= The Impossible Mr. Pipelet =

- Directed by: André Hunebelle
- Written by: Jacques Gut; Jean Halain
- Produced by: André Hunebelle
- Starring: Michel Simon; Louis de Funès
- Cinematography: Henri Thibault
- Edited by: Jean Feyte
- Music by: Jean Marion
- Distributed by: Pathé Consortium Cinéma
- Release date: 26 July 1955 (France)
- Running time: 92 minutes
- Country: France
- Language: French

The Impossible Mr. Pipelet (French: L'impossible Monsieur Pipelet), is a French comedy drama film from 1955, directed by André Hunebelle, written by Jacques Gut, starring Michel Simon and Louis de Funès. The film is known under the titles "The Impossible Mr. Pipelet" (international English title), "Ma fille et ses amours" Belgium French title), "Mijn dochter is verliefd" (Belgium Flemish title).

== Cast ==
- Michel Simon : Maurice Martin
- Gaby Morlay : Germaine Martin, wife of Maurice
- Etchika Choureau : Jacqueline Martin, the single daughter of Maurice and Germaine
- Louis de Funès : Uncle Robert, the brother of Germaine and the husband of Mathilda
- Louis Velle : Georges Richet, the son of the owners and doctor-to-be
- Mischa Auer : the unsuccessful writer, a lodger
- Maurice Baquet : Jojo, the oldest son of Robert an Mathilde, the boxer
- Jean Brochard : Mr Richet, the businessman who owns the building
- Jean-Jacques Delbo : Mr Francis, Ms's Greta's pimp
- Jacques Dynam : Mr Durand, the father-to-be
- Georgette Anys : Aunt Mathilde, Robert's wife
- Renée Passeur : Miss Richet, the businessman's wife
- Jess Hahn : Jérome K. Smith, un Américain lodger
- Dominique Maurin : Dédé, the youngest son of Robert an Mathilde
- Nicky Voillard : Miss Greta, a lodger in the 5th stock
- Jacqueline Gut : Misses Smith, Jérôme's wife
- Christiane Chambord : Myriam
- Noël Roquevert : the retired colonel, a lodger
- Benoîte Lab : the innkeeper
- Simone Bach : Jacqueline's friend
- Paul Azaïs : the caterer
