= Beware of Blondes (1950 film) =

1950 film

- French film poster
- French: Méfiez-vous des blondes
- Directed by: André Hunebelle
- Written by: Michel Audiard
- Produced by: André Hunebelle
- Starring: Raymond Rouleau; Martine Carol; Claude Farell
- Cinematography: Maurice Barry
- Edited by: Jean Feyte
- Music by: Jean Marion
- Production companies: Production Artistique et Cinématographique; Société Nouvelle Pathé Cinéma
- Distributed by: Pathé Consortium Cinéma
- Release date: 24 November 1950
- Running time: 102 minutes
- Country: France
- Language: French

Beware of Blondes (French: Méfiez-vous des blondes) is a 1950 French crime film directed by André Hunebelle and starring Raymond Rouleau, Martine Carol and Claude Farell. It is part of the trilogy of films featuring reporter Georges Masse. It was preceded by Mission in Tangier in 1949 and followed by Massacre in Lace (1952). It was shot at the Francoeur Studios in Paris. The film's sets were designed by the art director Lucien Carré.

== Synopsis ==
Masse investigates the death of a woman who had been trying to gain information of drug-smuggling organisations in the Far East.

== Partial cast ==
- Raymond Rouleau as Georges Masse
- Martine Carol as Olga Schneider
- Claude Farell as Suzanne Wilson
- Yves Vincent as Luigi Costelli
- Bernard La Jarrige as Petit Louis
- Henri Crémieux as M. Dubois
- Pierre Destailles as Lionel, le Voyageur
- Espanita Cortez as the Spanish Dancer
- Monique Darbaud as the Be Bop Dancer
- Martine Arden
- Madeleine Barbulée as Mme Dubois
- Anne-Marie Duverney as Anne-Marie
- Liliane Ernout
- Catherine Fath
- Claude Garbe
- Claude Winter
- Louis Bugette as the First Killer
- Robert Le Béal as the Second Killer
- Larbi Tounsi
- Françoise Lugagne as Janine Lambert
- Anny Flore as the Singer
- Ky Duyen as M. Dou
- Robert Arnoux as Editor-in-chief
- Noël Roquevert as Commissioner Besnard
