= René Thévenet =

French film producer

René Bezard
- Born: 5 May 1926; Oullins, Rhône-Alpes, France
- Died: 19 February 1998 (aged 67); Paris, France
- Occupation: Producer
- Years active: 1951-1973 (film)

René Thévenet (1926–1998) was a French film producer. He was a member of the jury at the 1973 Berlin Film Festival and the 1982 Cannes Film Festival. He was the elder brother of the film historian Pierre Lherminier.

== Selected filmography ==
- Thirteen at the Table (1955)
- Mannequins of Paris (1956)
- Les Collégiennes (1957)
- Mademoiselle Strip-tease (1957)
- Casino de Paris (1957)
- Daniella by Night (1961)
- Caesar the Conqueror (1962)
- The Killing Game (1967)
- Goto, Island of Love (1968)
- The Witness (1969)

== Bibliography ==
- Ford, Charles & Hammond, Robert. Polish Film: A Twentieth Century History. McFarland, 2005.
- Kinnard, Roy & Crnkovich, Tony. Italian Sword and Sandal Films, 1908–1990. McFarland, 2017.
- Marie, Michel. The French New Wave: An Artistic School. John Wiley & Sons, 2008.
