= The Voyage to America =

1951 French film by Henri Lavorel

- Directed by: Henri Lavorel
- Written by: Henri Lavorel; Roland Laudenbach
- Produced by: Henri Lavorel
- Starring: Pierre Fresnay; Yvonne Printemps; Jean Brochard
- Cinematography: Henri Alekan
- Edited by: Andrée Feix
- Music by: Francis Poulenc
- Production company: Le Monde en Images
- Distributed by: S.R.O
- Release date: 31 October 1951
- Running time: 91 minutes
- Country: France
- Language: French

The Voyage to America (French: Le Voyage en Amérique) is a 1951 French comedy film directed by Henri Lavorel and starring Pierre Fresnay, Yvonne Printemps and Jean Brochard. The film contrasts the prosperity of France and the United States in the post-Second World War era It replaced the Laurel and Hardy film Atoll K at the Olympia cinema in Paris, and was much more successful.

== Synopsis ==
A couple living a peaceful life in rural France, learn that their daughter who married an American GI is due to give birth to a grandchild. They head to the United States to visit, to the delight of the wife.

== Cast ==
- Pierre Fresnay as Gaston Fournier
- Yvonne Printemps as Clotilde Fournier
- Jean Brochard as the mayor
- Claude Laydu as François Soalhat
- Olivier Hussenot as Mr Soalhat, the gardener
- Jane Morlet as Marie
- Yvette Etievant as the post clerk
- Lisette Lebon as Marguerite
- Claire Gérard as Mrs Tassote
- Maurice Jacquemont as the priest
- Pierre Destailles as the cook
- Christian Fourcade as the rascal
- Madeleine Barbulée as the housekeeper
- Louis de Funès as the employee of Air France
- Léon Larive as Le caissier
- Eugène Frouhins as L'huissier
- Gabriel Gobin as Employé du car
- Émile Genevois as Le facteur
- Fernand Gilbert as Le client de la banque
- Jean Valmence as L'architecte

== Bibliography ==
- Aping, Norbert. The Final Film of Laurel and Hardy: A Study of the Chaotic Making and Marketing of Atoll K. McFarland, 2014.
- Prime, Rebecca. Hollywood Exiles in Europe: The Blacklist and Cold War Film Culture. Rutgers University Press, 2014.
