= Henri Lavorel =

French producer, writer, and director (1914–1955)

- Born: Henri-Albert-Sylvestre Lavorel; 5 July 1914; Annecy, Haute-Savoie, France
- Died: 7 January 1955 (aged 40); Versailles, France
- Occupations: Director; producer; writer
- Spouse: Madeleine Carroll (m. 1946; div. 1949)

Henri-Albert-Sylvestre Lavorel (5 July 1914 – 7 January 1955) was a French producer, writer and director.

== Biography ==
Henri Lavorel born in Annecy, Haute-Savoie and was married to the English actress Madeleine Carroll from 1946 to 1949. Lavorel died in a car crash in Versailles in 1955 aged 40.

He most notably worked on The Voyage to America (1951) (writer, producer, director) and C'est arrivé à Paris (1953) (producer, director).

== Selected filmography ==
- The Voyage to America (1951)
- It Happened in Paris (1952)
- Chéri-Bibi (1955)
