= Mannequins of Paris =

1956 film

- Directed by: André Hunebelle
- Written by: Michel Audiard; François Campaux; André Hunebelle
- Produced by: René Bezard; Pierre Cabaud; Paul Cadéac; André Hunebelle; Adrien Remaugé; René Thévenet
- Starring: Madeleine Robinson; Ivan Desny; Mischa Auer
- Cinematography: Paul Cotteret
- Edited by: Jean Feyte
- Music by: Jean Marion
- Production companies: Société Nouvelle Pathé Cinéma; Production Artistique et Cinématographique
- Distributed by: Pathé Consortium Cinéma; Lux Film (Italy)
- Release date: 19 September 1956
- Running time: 89 minutes
- Country: France
- Language: French

Mannequins of Paris (French: Mannequins de Paris) is a 1956 French drama film directed by André Hunebelle and starring Madeleine Robinson, Ivan Desny and Mischa Auer. It is set in the world of high fashion. The film's sets were designed by the art director Lucien Carré. It was shot in Technicolor with location shooting in Paris, Cannes and Rome.

== Synopsis ==
Promising artist Pierre gives up his career to help design styles for his wife Véronique's successful fashion house in Paris. Feeling neglected by her obsession with the business, he has an affair during a trip to Cannes to present the new collection and falls in love with an attractive singer.

== Cast ==
- Madeleine Robinson as Véronique Lanier
- Ivan Desny as Pierre Lanier
- Mischa Auer as Yaschlik
- Jacqueline Pierreux as Pearl
- Max Révol as Max
- Georges Chamarat as Boris Rabinowsky
- Jeanne Fusier-Gir as Gabrielle
- Marie-Hélène Arnaud as Josette
- Ghislaine Arsac as Wanda
- Jacqueline Huet as Christiane
- Elisa Lamotte as Une cliente
- Fabienne as Barbara
- Véronique Verlhac as Micheline
- Yvonne Monlaur as Janine
- Yôko Tani as Lotus
- Georgette Anys as Madame Vauthier
- Agnès Laurent as Lucette
- Pascale Audret as Francette
- Jacqueline Noëlle as Hermine
- Paulette Arnoux as Véronique – la bonne
- Blanche Issartel as Madame Blanche
- Anna Gaylor as Louisette
- Madeleine Barbulée as Madame Madeleine – la première
- Eliane Angeneau as Suzanne
- Daniel Ceccaldi as Un ami de Barbara
- Gregori Chmara as Boris

== Bibliography ==
- Bessy, Maurice. Histoire du cinéma français: 1956–1960. Pygmalion, 1986.
