= Les Dames du Bois de Boulogne =

1945 film by Robert Bresson

- Directed by: Robert Bresson
- Written by: Robert Bresson; Jean Cocteau (dialogue)
- Produced by: Raoul Ploquin
- Starring: Paul Bernard; María Casares; Élina Labourdette; Lucienne Bogaert
- Cinematography: Philippe Agostini
- Edited by: Jean Feyte
- Music by: Jean-Jacques Grünenwald
- Release dates: 21 September 1945 (France); 3 April 1964 (U.S.); June 1964 (UK)
- Running time: 84 min
- Country: France
- Language: French

Les Dames du Bois de Boulogne (French for "The Ladies of the Bois de Boulogne") is a 1945 French film directed by Robert Bresson. It is a modern adaptation of the story of Madame de La Pommeraye from Denis Diderot's Jacques le fataliste (1796) that tells the tale of a man who is tricked into marrying a prostitute.

Les Dames was Bresson's second feature. It is also his last film to feature a cast entirely composed of professional actors.

== Plot ==
Hélène and Jean have pledged their love to each other, but are not engaged to marry. Their love affair allows dalliances with others, but they have promised to put each other first above all others. Hélène has been warned by a friend that Jean's love for her has cooled and she fears this is true. She tricks him into confessing, by pretending her own feelings for him have cooled to a friendship. She hides her shock and dismay when he enthusiastically accepts her as now just a friend instead of a lover. After he leaves her apartment, it is clear that she is devastated. But instead of mourning her love, she decides to exact a cruel revenge on him.

Young Agnès is a cabaret dancer. Her ambition was to become a ballerina at the Opéra, but hard times have fallen on her, and in order to support herself and her mother, she has resorted to dancing in nightclubs and earning money as a prostitute. Hélène, in a pretense of compassion, offers to pay off Agnès's mother's debts and move them into an apartment, allowing Agnès to quit the nightlife.

Hélène sets a trap, enticing Jean to falling in love with Agnès. She assures him that Agnès and her mother are of an "impeccable" background. He is smitten as soon as he meets Agnès in the Bois de Boulogne, and makes no attempt to learn anything about her, instead relying on Helene's false information.

Agnès suspects they are being manipulated by Hélène, but feels powerless to escape the trap. Jean does not relent in his advances, and finally Agnès agrees to marry him. Hélène advises her not to breathe a word to Jean about her past until after they are wed, and insists to Jean that he allow her to plan a lavish wedding for them.

Immediately after the ceremony, Hélène first hints to Jean that something is amiss. Agnès had assumed that Hélène had already told Jean the truth, and learning she was tricked, faints. Jean confronts Hélène, who now divulges triumphantly that she maneuvered him into the marriage, and that all of the guests know the truth. Jean, filled with shame, bewilderment and rage, drives off, leaving his new bride still in an unconscious state.

Later that evening, Jean returns. Agnès' mother warns that the girl's heart is weak and that she could die. Jean walks into the room, stone-faced. Agnès, barely conscious, whispers that she hopes he will forgive her, but it is clear that she will free him by giving up her life. Agnès sighs, and appears to stop breathing. Jean is filled with love for her and begs her to be strong and to hang on to life. Although weak, she hears him and her faint smile assures him that she will live.

== Selected cast ==
- Maria Casarès as Hélène
- Élina Labourdette as Agnès
- Paul Bernard as Jean
- Lucienne Bogaert as Madame D.
- Jean Marchat as Jacques
- Yvette Etiévant as Hélène's maid

== Production ==
The filming conditions for the film were not simple; France was still occupied and the Allies regularly bombed Paris. Bresson and his team had to face numerous power cuts, bombing alerts and various restrictions imposed by the Germans or circumstances. The Liberation of Paris interrupted the filming which had begun at the end of April 1944. It resumed a few months later with a partly different technical team.

During one scene, Maria Casarès was expected to shed a few tears. She started by squinting and grimacing to make them come but Bresson was not satisfied. He suggested using glycerin tears. The actress refused and persisted in batting her eyelashes and wrinkling her nose to make herself cry. This did not suit the director who wanted a still face at all costs: "Don’t move your nose or anything at all. Only with open eyes", he said. She succeeded in achieving this but, being a perfectionist, Bresson demanded seven takes of the shot. Casarès therefore managed to cry seven times in a row while maintaining an impassive face.

Casarès had very bad memories of the filming, as she later testified: "I would never finish if I had to tell the story of this film, right from the start of shooting when Lucienne Bogaert and I were drinking brandy after brandy to respond to the desires and orders of Robert Bresson. He got us drunk to overcome our nerves, he said, and our personality, I think. Until the end where, discouraged, exhausted, defeated, almost all the actors abandoned, upon arriving at the studio, everything that could resemble a life of their own or a personal will to drag before our gentle tyrant what he desired: a body, a voice that he had chosen as one buys an object which will adorn a corner of a fireplace well, one thinks, … I have never hated anyone as I hated Robert Bresson on the set."

The role of Jean was originally to be played by Alain Cuny, who was replaced by Jean Marais, and finally given to Paul Bernard.

== Reception ==
Les Dames du Bois de Boulogne, while not one of Bresson's better-known films, nonetheless still receives positive reviews. It currently holds a perfect 100% on Rotten Tomatoes, with an average rating of 8.3/10 based on 15 critics.

As Bresson matured as a director, his style shifted, to the point where Les Dames is traditionally remembered as "an un-Bressonian film". David Thomson wrote that the film showed Bresson could have directed for Hollywood, noting its "passion for melodrama", its use of "mood music", and its reliance on "the conventions of terrific acting". He concluded that Les Dames reflects a transitional stage in Bresson's work, "as if we were watching Picasso still working in the Blue period, but beginning to be possessed by Cubism". Bresson personally disliked the film, saying: "It's a very bad film. I don't want to talk about it and I regret having allowed it to be shown on television."

The film was very influential among the French New Wave / Left Bank filmmakers; Jacques Rivette said that Les Dames and Jean Cocteau's Beauty and the Beast were "the key French film[s] for our generation". Jacques Demy frequently said that Les Dames was the most influential film of his childhood. He paid homage to the film in Lola (1961), which also starred Élina Labourdette.

The Italian filmmaker Bernardo Bertolucci personally told Bresson that he adored the film.
