= Irène Popard =

French choreographer (1894 – 1950)

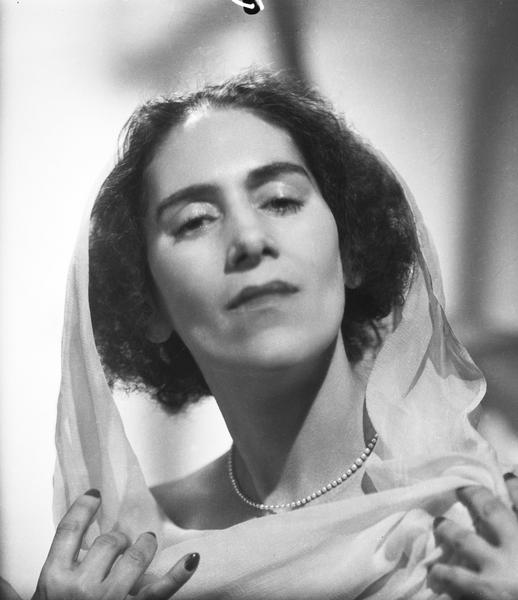
Irène Popard

Irène Popard (30 September 1894 – 30 April 1950) was a French choreographer.

== Biography ==
Irène Popard was born on 30 September 1894 in Paris. She completed her studies at the University of Boston. On her return to Paris, she started studying pure gymnastics, and became a teacher of physical education.

She was a student of Georges Demenÿ, who was “a pioneer of a more natural form of gymnastics.” According to Sharma, she took Demenÿ's “basic exercises and designed an outstanding educational and corrective programme for women.” In 1916 she started 'school of Popard gymnastics' through which she introduced ‘harmonic gymnastics'.

She died on 30 April 1950 in Marcigny.
