= Henri Crémieux =

French actor

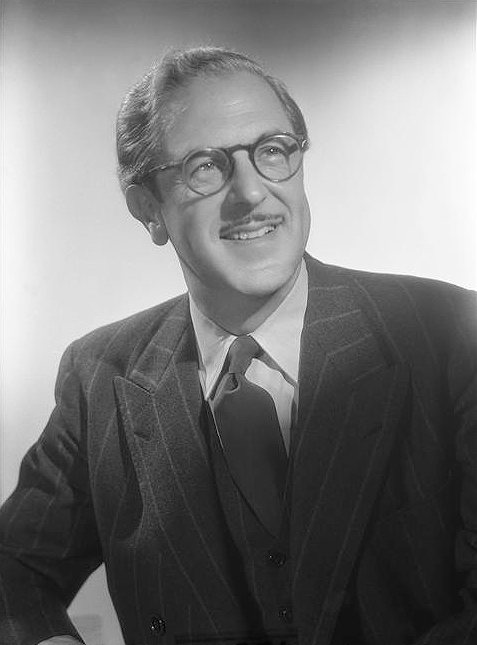
- Crémieux in 1950
- Born: 19 July 1896; Marseille, France
- Died: 10 May 1980 (aged 83); Aubagne, France
- Occupation: Actor
- Years active: 1930–1980

Henri Crémieux (19 July 1896 – 10 May 1980) was a French actor. He appeared in more than 100 films from 1930 to 1980.

== Selected filmography ==
Film
Year	Title	Role	Notes
1936	The Flame		
1937	The Pearls of the Crown		
1937	In Venice, One Night		
1937	A Picnic on the Grass		
1937	Southern Mail		
1938	Hercule		
1940	Narcisse		
1945	François Villon		
1946	The Temptation of Barbizon		
1947	Captain Blomet		
1947	Mirror		
1948	The Firemen's Ball		
1949	The Cupid Club		
1950	Lady Paname		
1950	Orpheus		
1950	The Happy Man		
1950	The Little Zouave		
1950	Beware of Blondes		
1950	The Chocolate Girl		
1951	Mr. Peek-a-Boo		
1952	Holiday for Henrietta		
1952	We Are All Murderers		
1952	The Case Against X		
1952	Le Plaisir		
1953	The Lady of the Camellias		
1954	L'Étrange Désir de monsieur Bard		
1954	Letters from My Windmill		
1954	Cadet Rousselle		
1955	Black Dossier		
1955	The Price of Love		
1955	Gas-Oil		
1956	La Bande à papa		
1956	Blood to the Head		
1957	The Suspects		
1958	The Law Is the Law		
1959	Toi, le venin		
1960	Lovers on a Tightrope		
1961	The President		
1964	Anatomy of a Marriage: My Days with Jean-Marc		
1970	Le Temps des loups	Catholic school headmaster	
1970	Peau d'Âne		
1976	The Smurfs and the Magic Flute		voice

TV
Year	Title	Role	Notes
1958-1975	Les Cinq Dernières Minutes		
