= Yves Ciampi =

French film director

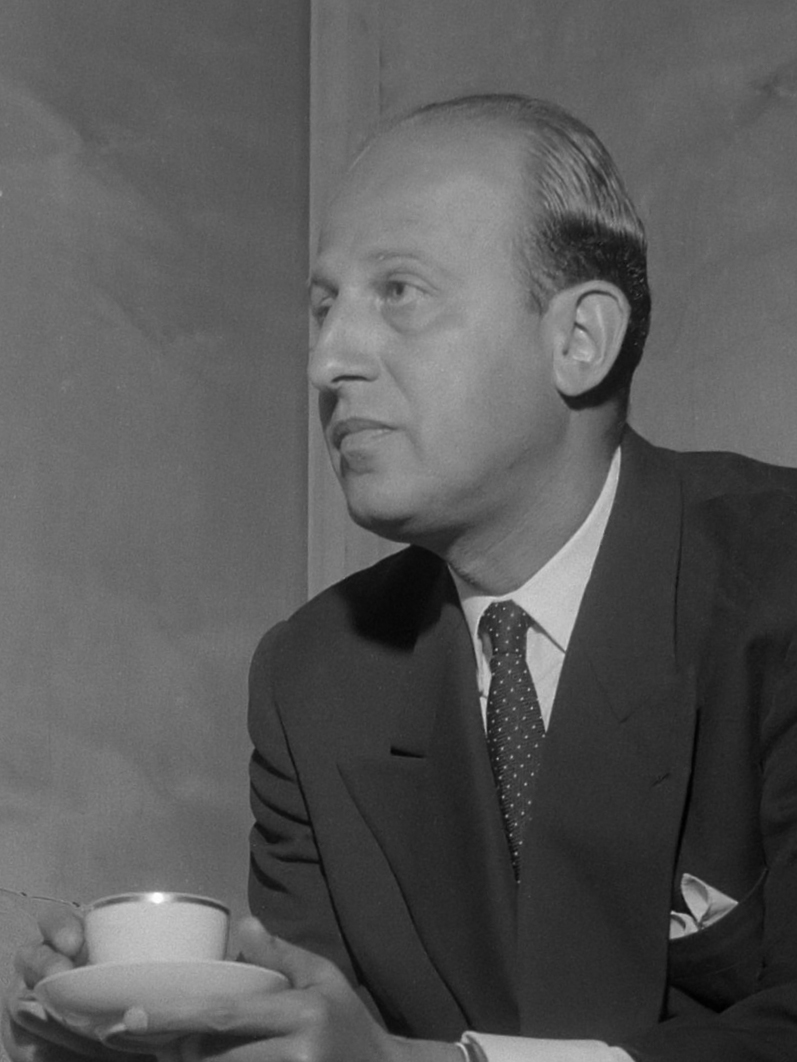
- Yves Ciampi (1957)
- Born: 9 February 1921; Paris, France
- Died: 5 November 1982 (aged 61); Paris, France
- Occupation: Film director
- Years active: 1949–1982
- Spouse: Keiko Kishi (m. 1957–1975)

Yves Ciampi (French: [sjɑ̃pi]; 9 February 1921 – 5 November 1982) was a French film director. He was married to Japanese actress Kishi Keiko from 1957 to 1975. His 1965 film Heaven on One's Head was entered into the 4th Moscow International Film Festival where it won a Golden Prize. In 1969 he was a member of the jury at the 6th Moscow International Film Festival.

== Filmography ==
- 1950: Suzanne and the Robbers
- 1950: Un certain monsieur
- 1951: Un grand patron
- 1952: The Happiest of Men
- 1953: The Slave
- 1954: Le Guérisseur
- 1955: The Heroes Are Tired
- 1957: Typhoon Over Nagasaki
- 1959: Le vent se lève
- 1961: Who Are You, Mr. Sorge?
- 1961: Liberté I
- 1965: Le Ciel sur la tête
- 1969: A quelques jours près
