= André Hunebelle =

French film director

- Born: 1 September 1896; Meudon, France
- Died: 27 November 1985 (aged 89); Nice, France
- Occupations: Glassmaker, film director

André Hunebelle (French pronunciation: [ɑ̃dʁe ynbɛl]; 1 September 1896 – 27 November 1985) was a French maître verrier (master glassmaker) and film director.

== Master Glass Artist ==
After attending polytechnic school for mathematics, he became a decorator, a designer, and then a master glass maker in the mid-1920s (first recorded exhibition PARIS 1927 included piece "Fruit & Foliage"). His work is known for its clean lines, which are elegant and singularly strong. He exhibited his own glass in a luxurious store located at 2 Avenue Victor-Emmanuel III, at the roundabout of the Champs Èlysées in Paris. Etienne Franckhauser, who also made molds for Lalique and Sabino, made the molds for Hunebelle's glass which was fabricated by the crystal factory in Choisy-le-Roi, France. Hunebelle's store ceased all activity in 1938 prior to World War II.

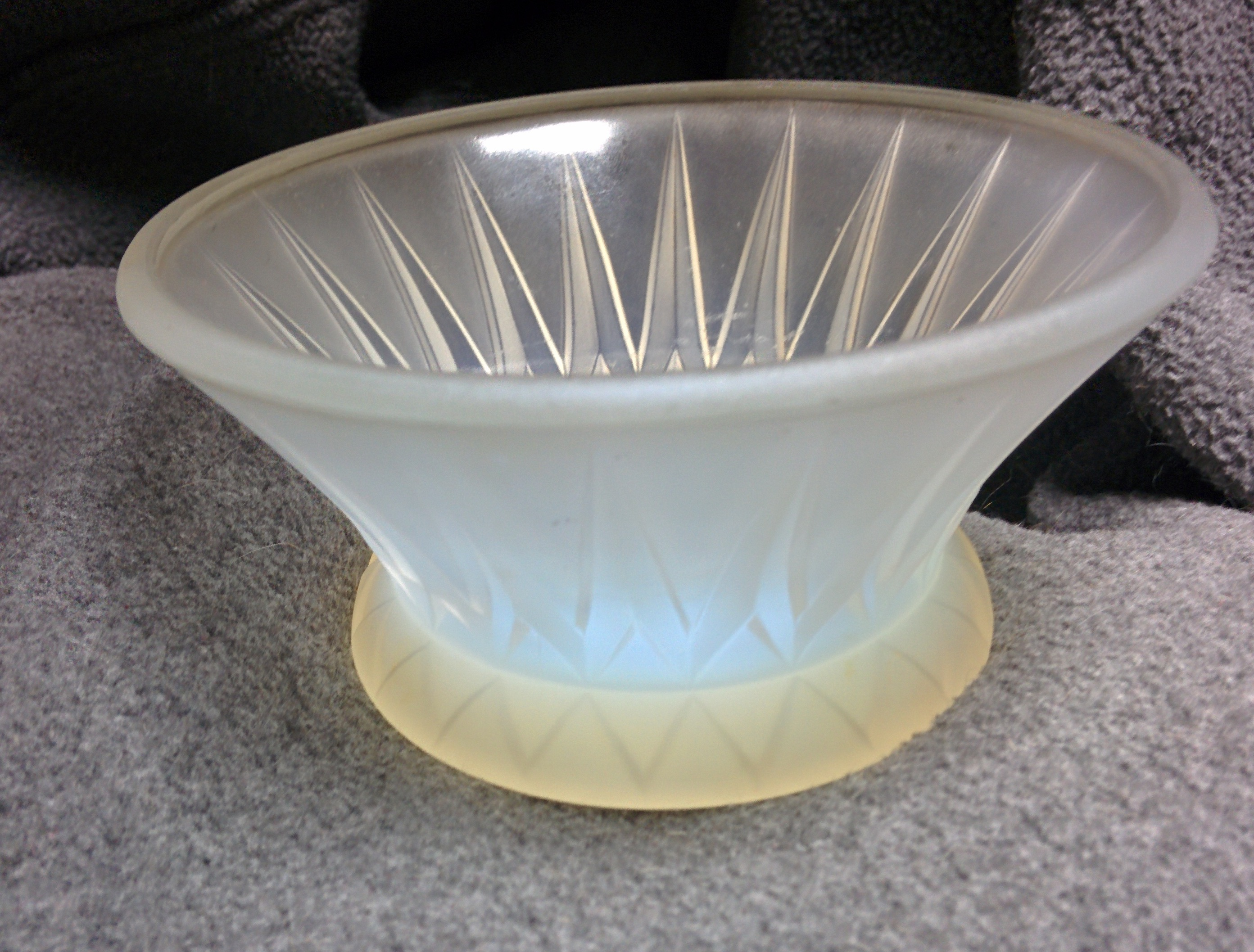
André Hunebelle—Small Bowl In The "Cactus" Pattern (c. 1930)

Hunebelle pieces are marked in several ways. The most common is A.HUNEBELLE-FRANCE in molded capitals either within the glass design or on the base. Other pieces are marked simply A.HUNEBELLE. There was also a paper label with A and H superimposed in a stylized manner. Since paper labels are frequently lost, many pieces may appear completely unmarked. In the author's collection there are pieces marked A.HUNEBELLE both with and without the word FRANCE, and a bowl marked MADE IN FRANCE that is identical to one shown in a Hunebelle catalogue. Hunebelle also used a more elaborate maker's mark imprinted on some glass pieces which had the word FRANCE encircled by the words MADE IN FRANCE MODELLE DEPOSE et R COGNEVILLE and with A. HUNEBELLE underneath (reflects mid 1930s partnership with COGNEVILLE).

In a short essay, he defined his stylistic aims as a glassmaker, explaining that he wanted to be "an adept of an abstract art where the geometric exactness, the poetry of line, and transparency are combined."

He also patented techniques for producing exact mouldings of items.

His glasswork displays a calculated modernism in contrast to influences derived from animals, plants and flowers which featured in the work of contemporaries such as René Lalique, Pierre D'Avesn and Marius-Ernest Sabino at the time. Hunebelle chose to focus on geometric forms, using technique and his scientific background to enhance light emission as much as possible. Surface contrasts, volume intersections, polished-non polished effects, geometry, light and poetry of line feature prominently in his work. Hunebelle employed both mold-blown and pressed-molded techniques in producing his pieces.

== Filmmaker ==
Hunebelle was a publisher of a French newspaper called La Fleché. During World War II, he had no job until a friend Marcel Achard found him work in films for Production Artistique Cinématographique (P.A.C.) where he acted as an art director and later began producing films beginning with Leçon de conduite (1946). He directed his first film Métier de fous in 1948.

His next three films were a film series of French film noir featuring Raymond Rouleau as a journalist character mixing with crime. All three had the titles beginning with the letter "M" in honour of author Pierre Benoît whose heroines all began with the letter "A". The films were written by Michel Audiard, a crime novelist.

In 1960 Hunebelle teamed up with Jean Marais to make several successful swashbucklers. Following the highly successful French release of Dr No in 1963, Marais thought of adapting Jean Bruce's spy hero OSS 117 in a series of films starring himself; however, Hunebelle selected the American actor Kerwin Mathews. At the same time as his OSS 117 films, Hunebelle and Marais made a trilogy of Fantômas films.

== Filmography ==
- 1948 : Métier de fous, with Henri Guisol, Gaby Sylvia
- 1949 : Mission in Tangier, with Raymond Rouleau
- 1949 : Millionaires for One Day, Gaby Morlay, Pierre Brasseur
- 1950 : Beware of Blondes, with Raymond Rouleau, Martine Carol, Claude Farell
- 1951 : My Wife Is Formidable, with Fernand Gravey, Sophie Desmarets
- 1952 : Massacre in Lace, with Raymond Rouleau, Anne Vernon
- 1952 : Monsieur Taxi, with Michel Simon
- 1952 : My Husband Is Marvelous, with Fernand Gravey, Sophie Desmarets
- 1953 : Les Trois Mousquetaires, with Georges Marchal, Bourvil, Gino Cervi
- 1954 : Cadet Rousselle, with François Périer, Dany Robin, Bourvil
- 1955 : Thirteen at the Table, with Micheline Presle, Fernand Gravey, Mischa Auer
- 1955 : The Impossible Mr. Pipelet, with Michel Simon
- 1956 : Mannequins of Paris, with Madeleine Robinson, Ivan Desny, Mischa Auer
- 1957 : Les Collégiennes, with Marie-Hélène Arnaud
- 1957 : Casino de Paris, with Gilbert Bécaud, Caterina Valente, Vittorio De Sica
- 1958 : Les femmes sont marrantes, with Micheline Presle
- 1958 : Taxi, Roulotte et Corrida, with Louis de Funès
- 1959 : Arrêtez le massacre, with Jean Richard
- 1959 : Le Bossu, with Jean Marais, Sabine Sesselmann, Bourvil
- 1960 : Le Capitan, with Jean Marais, Bourvil, Elsa Martinelli
- 1961 : Le Miracle des loups, with Jean Marais, Rosanna Schiaffino, Jean-Louis Barrault, Roger Hanin
- 1962 : The Mysteries of Paris, with Jean Marais, Dany Robin, Jill Haworth, Raymond Pellegrin, Pierre Mondy
- 1963 : OSS 117 se déchaîne, with Kerwin Mathews, Irina Demick
- 1963 : Méfiez-vous, mesdames, with Michèle Morgan, Danielle Darrieux, Paul Meurisse, Sandra Milo
- 1964 : Fantômas, with Jean Marais, Louis de Funès, Mylène Demongeot
- 1964 : Banco à Bangkok pour OSS 117, with Kerwin Mathews, Robert Hossein, Pier Angeli
- 1965 : Furia à Bahia pour OSS 117, with Frederick Stafford, Mylène Demongeot, Raymond Pellegrin
- 1965 : Fantômas se déchaîne, with Jean Marais, Louis de Funès, Mylène Demongeot
- 1967 : Fantômas contre Scotland Yard, with Jean Marais, Louis de Funès, Mylène Demongeot
- 1968 : Sous le signe de Monte-Cristo, with Paul Barge, Claude Jade, Anny Duperey, Pierre Brasseur, Michel Auclair, Raymond Pellegrin
- 1968 : Pas de roses pour OSS 117, with John Gavin, Margaret Lee, Curd Jürgens, Robert Hossein, Luciana Paluzzi
- 1973 : Joseph Balsamo (TV miniseries), with Jean Marais, Udo Kier
- 1974 : The Four Charlots Musketeers, with Les Charlots, Josephine Chaplin, Daniel Ceccaldi
- 1974 : The Four Charlots Musketeers 2, with Les Charlots, Josephine Chaplin, Daniel Ceccaldi
- 1978 : Ça fait tilt, with Bernard Menez, Eleonora Giorgi, Michel Constantin, Yoko Tani
