= My Wife Is Formidable =

1951 film

- Directed by: André Hunebelle
- Written by: Jean Halain; Michel Audiard
- Produced by: André Hunebelle
- Starring: Fernand Gravey; Sophie Desmarets; Simone Valère
- Cinematography: Paul Cotteret
- Edited by: Jean Feyte
- Music by: Jean Marion; Jean Halain
- Production company: Pathé Consortium Cinéma
- Distributed by: C. F. R.
- Release date: 5 December 1951
- Running time: 92 minutes
- Country: France
- Language: French

My Wife Is Formidable (French: Ma femme est formidable) is a 1951 French comedy film directed by André Hunebelle and starring Fernand Gravey, Sophie Desmarets and Simone Valère. It was shot at the Saint-Maurice Studios in Paris. The film's sets were designed by the art director Lucien Carré; the costume designer was Pierre Balmain. It was followed by a loose sequel My Husband Is Marvelous in 1952.

== Synopsis ==
Celebrated sculptor Raymond Corbier loves his wife Sylvia and trusts her implicitly. For the first time in their marriage she has to mislead him while fending off the advances of an admirer who threatens suicide. This small lie endangers their loving relationship.

== Main cast ==
- Fernand Gravey as Raymond Corbier (Sylvia's husband)
- Sophie Desmarets as Sylvia Corbier (Raymond's wife)
- Simone Valère as Marguerite Rival (Gaston's wife)
- Alfred Adam as Dr Gaston (Daisy's husband)
- Suzanne Dehelly as Sylvia's mother
- Jacques Dynam as Francis Germain (the trumpet player)
- Pauline Carton as the concierge
- Alan Adairas Mr Hartley (the Englishman)
- Louis de Funès as the skier in search of a hotel room
- Pierre Destailles as the hotel porter
- Noël Roquevert as the hotel director
- Max Dalban as a furniture remover

== See also ==
- My Husband Is Marvelous

== Bibliography ==
- Rège, Philippe. Encyclopedia of French Film Directors, Volume 1. Scarecrow Press, 2009.
