= Jean Feyte =

French film editor (1903–1996)

- Born: 21 October 1903; Marseille, France
- Died: 4 January 1996 (aged 92)
- Occupation: Editor
- Years active: 1931–1971 (film)

Jean Feyte (21 October 1903 – 4 January 1996) was a French film editor.

== Selected filmography ==
- Suzanne (1932)
- Knock (1933)
- Jeanne (1934)
- Princesse Tam-Tam (1935)
- Merchant of Love (1935)
- King of the Camargue (1935)
- Return to Paradise (1935)
- The Phantom Wagon (1939)
- Three from St Cyr (1939)
- Midnight Tradition (1939)
- Happy Days (1941)
- Romance for Three (1942)
- The Woman I Loved Most (1942)
- The Benefactor (1942)
- The Phantom Baron (1943)
- Arlette and Love (1943)
- The Count of Monte Cristo (1943)
- Traveling Light (1944)
- Les Dames du Bois de Boulogne (1945)
- La Fiancée des ténèbres (1945)
- Gates of the Night (1946)
- Monsieur Vincent (1947)
- The Spice of Life (1948)
- Operation Swallow (1948)
- Mission in Tangier (1949)
- Millionaires for One Day (1949)
- Suzanne and the Robbers (1949)
- A Certain Mister (1950)
- Women Are Crazy (1950)
- Beware of Blondes (1950)
- My Wife Is Formidable (1951)
- Two Pennies Worth of Violets (1951)
- Darling Caroline (1951)
- Mister Taxi (1952)
- The Case Against X (1952)
- The Girl with the Whip (1952)
- Crimson Curtain (1952)
- My Husband Is Marvelous (1952)
- The Three Musketeers (1953)
- La môme vert-de-gris (1953)
- Cadet Rousselle (1954)
- The Women Couldn't Care Less (1954)
- I'll Get Back to Kandara (1956)
- Tides of Passion (1956)
- Mannequins of Paris (1956)
- Le Bossu (1959)
- Captain Blood (1960)
- The Seven Deadly Sins (1962)
- Méfiez-vous, mesdames (1963)
- Panic in Bangkok (1964)
- The Troops of St. Tropez (1964)
- The Diabolical Dr. Z (1965)

== Bibliography ==
- James S. Williams. Jean Cocteau. Manchester University Press, 2006.
