= Lucien Carré =

French art director (born 1904)

- Born: 19 March 1904; Paris, France
- Died: unknown
- Occupation: Art Director
- Years active: 1929-1958 (film)

Lucien Carré (born 1904) was a French art director active in the French cinema designing film sets from the late 1920s to the late 1950s. He worked frequently with the director André Hunebelle as well as Julien Duvivier and Anatole Litvak.

== Selected filmography ==
- The Queen's Necklace (1929)
- Wine Cellars (1930)
- The Red Head (1932)
- The Last Billionaire (1934)
- Tartarin of Tarascon (1934)
- Les Misérables (1934)
- The Crew (1935)
- With a Smile (1936)
- Hélène (1936)
- Grey's Thirteenth Investigation (1937)
- White Nights in Saint Petersburg (1938)
- Domino (1943)
- Florence Is Crazy (1944)
- Mr. Orchid (1946)
- Sylvie and the Ghost (1946)
- Lunegarde (1946)
- The Beautiful Trip (1947)
- The Woman in Red (1947)
- Three Boys, One Girl (1948)
- The Spice of Life (1948)
- Mission in Tangier (1949)
- Millionaires for One Day (1949)
- Suzanne and the Robbers (1949)
- One Only Loves Once (1950)
- Women Are Crazy (1950)
- My Wife Is Formidable (1951)
- The Passage of Venus (1951)
- Dakota 308 (1951)
- The Case Against X (1952)
- My Husband Is Marvelous (1952)
- Massacre in Lace (1952)
- Cadet Rousselle (1954)
- Quay of Blondes (1954)
- Thirteen at the Table (1955)
- Mannequins of Paris (1956)
- A Certain Monsieur Jo (1958)

== Bibliography ==
- Capua, Michelangelo. Anatole Litvak: The Life and Films. McFarland, 2015.
- Waldman, Harry. Maurice Tourneur: The Life and Films. McFarland, 2001.
