= Jean Marion =

French film score composer

- Born: 6 May 1912; Paris, France
- Died: 6 May 2012 (aged 45); Paris, France
- Occupation: Composer
- Years active: 1942-1967 (film)

Jean Marion (1912–1967) was a French composer known for his work on film scores.

== Selected filmography ==
- The Inevitable Monsieur Dubois (1943)
- Voyage Without Hope (1943)
- Florence Is Crazy (1944)
- Box of Dreams (1945)
- Mademoiselle X (1945)
- Lessons in Conduct (1946)
- The Bouquinquant Brothers (1947)
- Rendezvous in Paris (1947)
- Fantômas (1947)
- Impeccable Henri (1948)
- The Idol (1948)
- Millionaires for One Day (1949)
- The Cupid Club (1949)
- The King (1949)
- Amédée (1950)
- Women Are Crazy (1950)
- Just Me (1950)
- Beware of Blondes (1950)
- My Wife Is Formidable (1951)
- My Seal and Them (1951)
- My Husband Is Marvelous (1952)
- This Man Is Dangerous (1953)
- Quay of Blondes (1954)
- Cadet Rousselle (1954)
- L'impossible Monsieur Pipelet (1955)
- Thirteen at the Table (1955)
- Mannequins of Paris (1956)
- OSS 117 Is Not Dead (1957)
- Anyone Can Kill Me (1957)
- A Friend of the Family (1957)
- Taxi, Roulotte et Corrida (1958)
- Le Bossu (1959)
- Le Miracle des loups (1961)
- The Big Restaurant (1966)
- Oscar (1967)
