= Marcel Grignon =

French cinematographer

- Born: 9 November 1914; Paris, France
- Died: 6 June 1990 (aged 75); Crosne, France
- Occupation: Cinematographer
- Years active: 1937 - 1988 (film)

Marcel Grignon (November 9, 1914 – June 6, 1990) was a French cinematographer.

== Selected filmography ==
- Latin Quarter (1939)
- The Spirit of Sidi-Brahim (1939)
- The Blue Veil (1942)
- Home Port (1943)
- The Eleventh Hour Guest (1945)
- Women's Games (1946)
- The Angel They Gave Me (1946)
- The Lost Village (1947)
- The Seventh Door (1947)
- The Murdered Model (1948)
- City of Hope (1948)
- Five Red Tulips (1949)
- Cage of Girls (1949)
- Forbidden to the Public (1949)
- Millionaires for One Day (1949)
- The Little Zouave (1950)
- Minne (1950)
- Quay of Grenelle (1950)
- Adventures of Captain Fabian (1951)
- The Little Cardinals (1951)
- The Prettiest Sin in the World (1951)
- My Husband Is Marvelous (1952)
- The Happiest of Men (1952)
- Women Are Angels (1952)
- The Slave (1953)
- Quay of Blondes (1954)
- Cadet Rousselle (1954)
- Four Days in Paris (1955)
- Blackmail (1955)
- It Happened in Aden (1956)
- Love in Jamaica (1957)
- Prey for the Shadows (1961)
- Vice and Virtue (1961)
- Destination Rome (1963)
- Greed in the Sun (1964)
- OSS 117 Mission for a Killer (1965)
- Is Paris Burning? (1966)
- Impossible Is Not French (1974)

== Bibliography ==
- Greco, Joseph. The File on Robert Siodmak in Hollywood, 1941-1951. Universal-Publishers, 1999.
