= Billancourt Studios =

Film studios located in Paris

Billancourt Studios was a film studio in Paris which operated between 1922 and 1992. Located in Boulogne-Billancourt, it was one of the leading French studios. It was founded in the silent era by Henri Diamant-Berger. During the Second World War the studio was used by Continental Films, a company financed by the German occupiers. They are also known as the Paris-Studio-Cinéma. They should not be confused with the nearby Boulogne Studios.

== History ==
Henri Diamant-Berger set up his studios in the buildings sold by the aircraft cabin builder Niepce and Fetterer, taking advantage of the infrastructure left behind and the immensity of the buildings. He thus created the first modern French studio, including on the same place restaurant, workshops, dressing rooms. A clean power plant produces lights of unrivaled power.

In 1926, the studios were bought by Pierre Braunberger and Roger Richebé under the name Paris Studios Cinéma. They know with talking pictures their real start thanks to the Western Electric sound recording system. In 1933, a fire provided an opportunity to rebuild better and bigger. A room of fifteen meters high under ceiling is traversed by modular metal walkways. Set designers Alexandre Trauner and Eugène Lourié, cinematographer Henri Alekan and unique technical know-how propel the studios to first place in Europe.

== Bibliography ==
- Crisp, C.G. The Classic French Cinema, 1930-1960. Indiana University Press, 1993.
- Petr Szczepanik, Patrick Vonderau. Behind the Screen: Inside European Production Cultures. Palgrave Macmillan, 2013.
