= McMeeking =

McMeeking is a surname. Notable people with the surname include:

- David McMeeking (1896–1976), New Zealand rugby union player
- David McMeeking (cricketer) (1937–2013), South African cricketer
- Robert McMeeking (born 1950), Scottish-born American engineer
- Sacha McMeeking, New Zealand academic, lawyer, activist and strategic consultant
