= Mad as Birds =

Independent Film Company

- Type: Film Production
- Industry: Motion Picture
- Founded: 2014
- Founder: Celyn Jones
- Headquarters: Wirral
- Key people: Celyn Jones & Sean Marley
- Website: madasbirdsfilms.com

Mad as Birds is a United Kingdom based independent film and TV production company founded in Spring 2013 by Welsh actor, director, and writer Celyn Jones. In 2015, producer Sean Marley joined as Company Director. The title, Mad as Birds, is derived from the poem Love in the Asylum by Dylan Thomas.

Mad as Birds are best known for producing films such as Set Fire to the Stars, The Vanishing (2018 film), Six Minutes to Midnight, Poms (film), and The Almond and the Seahorse.

== Filmography ==
Year	Film	Director(s)	Notes
2014	Set Fire to the Stars	Andy Goddard	Premiered at Edinburgh Film Festival Won - BAFTA Cymru for Best Original Music (Gruff Rhys) Won - BAFTA Cymru for Best Production Design Won - BAFTA Cymru for Best Make-Up & Hair Nominated - BAFTA Cymru for Best Production Design Nominated - BAFTA Cymru for Best Cinematography Nominated - BAFTA Cymru for Best Screenwriter Nominated - BAFTA Cymru for Best Feature Nominated - BAFTA Cymru for Best Costume Design
2018	The Vanishing (2018 film)	Kristoffer Nyholm	Premiered at the Sitges Film Festival in 2018. Nominated - BAFTA Scotland for Best Supporting Actor (Peter Mullan) Nominated - British Independent Film Award for Best Supporting Actor (Peter Mullan)
2019	Poms (film)	Zara Hayes	
2020	Six Minutes to Midnight	Andy Goddard	Nominated - BAFTA Cymru for Best Actress (Judi Dench) Nominated - BAFTA Cymru for Best Costume Design
2022	The Almond and the Seahorse	Celyn Jones and Tom Stern (cinematographer)	Premiered at the Zurich Film Festival in 2022
2025	Rabbit Trap	Bryn Chainey	Premiered in the Midnight section at the 2025 Sundance Film Festival
2026	Madfabulous	Celyn Jones	Selected for the 2025 GREAT 8 Showcase at Cannes Film Festival World premiere at the BFI Flare: London LGBTQIA+ Film Festival on Wednesday, 25 March 2026
	Mountain	Celyn Jones	

== Television ==
Year	Television	Director	Notes
2022	Galwad	Claire Doherty (Creative Director), Gethin Evans (Live Director), Eric Styles	Nominated for the Rose D’Or
