= Celyn Jones =

Welsh actor, director and writer

Jones at the 2026 BFI London Film Festival

Celyn Jones is a Welsh actor, director and writer. He trained as an actor at the Manchester Youth Theatre where he won a scholarship to the Oxford School of Drama. In 2019, Jones won a BAFTA Cymru Award for Best Actor, for his performance of a real life serial Killer in Manhunt. In 2013, Jones founded the UK based independent Film and TV Production Company, Mad as Birds.

== Filmography ==
Year	Title	Director	Writer	Producer	Notes
2014	Set Fire to the Stars	No	Yes	Yes	
2018	The Vanishing	No	Yes	Yes	
2019	Poms	No	No	Yes	
2020	Six Minutes to Midnight	No	Yes	Yes	
2022	The Almond and the Seahorse	Yes	No	Yes	
2026	Madfabulous	Yes	No	Yes	

=== Acting roles ===
Television

Year	Title	Role	Notes
2002	Shackleton	Perce Blacborow	TV Mini series
2002	The Bench	Rowan Kelly	
2004	Grange Hill	Mr. Green	13 Episodes
2006	Torchwood	Gary	
2007	Joe`s Place	Whittle	TV Movie
2010	The Bill	Nigel Wren	
2010	Law & Order: UK	Ellis Bevan	
2007-2001	Casualty	Multiple	
2010-2012	Above Suspicion	DS Paul Barolli	2010-2012
2012	Leaving	Hugh	TV Mini Series
2013	Jo	Nick Normand	
2013	Shameless	Joss	
2013	Marple	Sergeant Keene	
2014	Inspector George Gently	Francis Walsh	
2014	Endeavor	Jenkins	
2013-2014	Da Vinci`s Demons	Fabrizio	
2014	A Touch of Cloth	Villager	
2014-2015	Stella	Brother Alan	
2017	Catastrophe	Aeron	
2019	Manhunt	Levi Bellfield	Won a BAFTA Cymru Award for Best Actor
2025	The Librarians: The Next Chapter	Cupid	

Film

Year	Title	Role	Director	Notes
2003	Hearts of Gold	Trevor Lewis	Richard Laxton	TV Movie
2005	Lassie	Snickers	Charles Sturridge	
2007	Honey and Razor Blade	Mark	Tinge Krishnan	
2014	Set Fire to The Stars	Dylan Thomas	Andy Goddard	
2015	Chasing Robert Barker	Blonde Man	Daniel Florencio	
	The White Room	Father Marcus	James Erskine	
2017	Maryline	Jacky Conwell	Guillaume Gallienne	
2017	The Current War	Sherman Quincey	Alfonso Gomez-Rejon	
2017	Submergence	Thumbs	Wim Wenders	
2018	Say My Name	Kipper	Jay Stern	
2019	Mr Jones	Matthew	Agnieszka Holland	
2019	Born A King	Winston Churchill	Agustí Villaronga	
2020	In Hope of Nothing	Lenard	Peter Hamblin	
2020	Six Minutes to Midnight	Corporal Willis	Andy Goddard	
2020	A Christmas Gift From Bob	Mick	Charles Martin Smith	
2021	The Last Bus	Dr Martin	Gillies McKinnon	
2022	Venice at Dawn	Detective Symonds	Jamie Adams	
2022	The Almond and the Seahorse	Joe	Celyn Jones	
2023	Chuch Chuck Baby	Gary	Janis Pugh	
2024	Swede Caroline	Willy	Finn Bruce & Brook Driver	
2025	On the Sea	Dyfan	Helen Walsh	
	Marcel et Monsieur Pagnol	Fernandel	Sylvain Chomet	
	Black Church Bay	Andrews	Rhys Marc Jones	
	A Visit to Grandpa`s	Mr. Griff	D.J. Caruso	
