= A Kind of Murder =

- Theatrical release poster
- Directed by: Andy Goddard
- Written by: Susan Boyd
- Based on: The Blunderer by Patricia Highsmith
- Produced by: Susan Boyd; Ted Hope; Kelly McCormick; Christine Vachon
- Starring: Patrick Wilson; Jessica Biel; Vincent Kartheiser; Haley Bennett; Eddie Marsan
- Cinematography: Chris Seager
- Edited by: Jane Rizzo; Elisabet Ronaldsdottir
- Music by: Danny Bensi; Saunder Jurriaans; Regina Teeret
- Production companies: Sierra Pictures; Electric Shadow; 120dB Films; Killer Films
- Distributed by: Magnolia Pictures
- Release dates: April 17, 2016 (Tribeca); December 16, 2016 (United States)
- Running time: 95 minutes
- Country: United States
- Language: English
- Box office: $91,149

A Kind of Murder is an American murder mystery and psychological thriller directed by Andy Goddard from a screenplay by Susan Boyd based upon the 1954 Patricia Highsmith novel The Blunderer. It stars Patrick Wilson, Jessica Biel, Vincent Kartheiser, Haley Bennett, and Eddie Marsan. The film had its world premiere at the Tribeca Film Festival on April 17, 2016 and was released in the United States on December 16, 2016, by Magnolia Pictures.

== Plot ==
Walter Stackhouse is an architect by day and an aspiring writer of short-story crime fiction by night who is fascinated by the recent murder of a local woman. He pays a visit to Kimmel, the deceased woman's husband, at his used bookstore, pretending to be a customer looking for a book on architecture, but Kimmel's suspicions are aroused. Stackhouse has a troubled marriage, and his own wife, Clara, turns up dead as a result of an apparent suicide, not far from the restaurant parking lot where Kimmel's wife was murdered. Corby, the police detective investigating both deaths, suspects that the respective husbands are guilty of murder and that there is a connection between them. We learn in flashbacks that Clara's accusations of infidelity were justified, as Walter had indeed started an affair with nightclub singer Ellie Briess, and that Walter may have subtly suggested to Clara that she follow through on her threats to commit suicide. Ellie Briess tells Walter of her concern over previous remarks of his indicating that he would welcome Clara's death. Corby increases the pressure on the two suspects, successfully inciting Kimmel against Stackhouse by accusing the latter of being a copycat killer who will somehow incriminate him. Through another flashback we learn that Kimmel did indeed murder his wife although no revelation is forthcoming that Walter had murdered Clara.

The film concludes with Kimmel and Corby following Stackhouse to the nightclub where Ellie works. When Stackhouse tries to flee, Corby and Kimmel, together with attending police detectives, chase Stackhouse into the nightclub's underground passageways. Kimmel kills an officer, having mistaken him for Stackhouse. Realizing his error, Kimmel corners Stackhouse and attempts to stab him. The police fatally shoot Kimmel. Stackhouse, lying on the ground wounded, gradually manages a smile as he contemplates the relationship between fiction and reality.

In the movie's final shot, a typewriter clatters out the words "THE END."

== Cast ==
- Patrick Wilson as Walter Stackhouse
- Jessica Biel as Clara Stackhouse
- Vincent Kartheiser as Detective Lawrence Corby
- Haley Bennett as Ellie Briess
- Eddie Marsan as Mitchell "Marty" Kimmel
- Jon Osbeck as Jon Carr
- Radek Lord as Tony Ricco
- Christine Dye as Claudia
- Michael Douglas Hall as Mr. Devries

== Production ==
In February 2013, it was revealed that Andy Goddard had been attached to direct the film, from a screenplay by Susan Boyd, with Ted Hope, Christine Vachon, and Kelly McCormick producing under their Killer Films and Sierra Pictures banner, respectively. In May 2014, it was announced that Patrick Wilson, Jessica Biel, Imogen Poots and Toby Jones had been cast in the film. In November 2014, Haley Bennett joined the cast of the film, replacing Poots. That same month, Eddie Marsan joined the cast of the film, replacing Jones. In August 2015, the film's title was changed from "The Blunderer" to "A Kind of Murder".

=== Filming ===
Principal photography began on November 17, 2014 in Cincinnati, Ohio, under the title "The Blunderer". In December 2014, a casting call was put out for 1950 cars, and male extras. Production concluded on December 16, 2014.

=== Post-production ===
In June 2015, it was reported that Saunder Jurriaans and Danny Bensi had composed the score for the film.

== Release ==
The film had its world premiere at the Tribeca Film Festival on April 17, 2016. Shortly after, Magnolia Pictures acquired distribution rights to the film. The film was released on December 16, 2016.

== Reception ==
On Rotten Tomatoes the film has an approval rating of 35% based on reviews from 17 critics. On Metacritic the film has a score of 50% based on reviews from 7 critics, indicating "mixed or average" reviews.

Nick Schager of Variety wrote: "While thrills are mitigated by convoluted plotting and suspect character behavior, the film's uniquely bleak twist on classic noir conventions is enlivening."

John DeFore of The Hollywood Reporter called it "A handsome period piece that plays more like a scant-clues mystery than like the psychological thriller it intends to be."

== See also ==
- Enough Rope (1963)
