= John Malcolm Brinnin =

Canadian poet (1916–1998)

John Malcolm Brinnin (September 13, 1916 – June 26, 1998) was a Canadian-born American poet and literary critic.

== Life and work ==
Brinnin was born in Halifax, Nova Scotia, Canada, to American parents John A. Brinnin and Frances Malcolm Brinnin.

When he was still a boy, Brinnin's parents moved to Detroit, Michigan. Brinnin went to the University of Michigan for his undergraduate studies where he won three Hopwood Awards in 1938, 1939 and 1940. He worked his way through school in an Ann Arbor book store. During part of this time (1936–1938), Brinnin served as the editor of the journal Signatures. Graduating from Michigan in 1942, Brinnin went to Harvard University for graduate work.

From 1949 to 1956, Brinnin was Director of the Young Men's and Young Women's Hebrew Association Poetry Center, popularly known today as the 92nd Street Y. While he was there, he raised the center to national attention as a focal point for poetry in the United States. He was, for example, the first person to bring Dylan Thomas to the US and his 1955 book, Dylan Thomas in America, describes much of his attempt to befriend and help the troubled Welsh poet.

In addition to his work on Thomas, Brinnin published six volumes of his own poetry. These collections include The Garden is Political (1942), The Sorrows of Cold Stone (1951), and Skin Diving in the Virgins, and Other Poems, his last publication in 1970. Brinnin also wrote scholarly works on T. S. Eliot, Gertrude Stein, Truman Capote, and William Carlos Williams, and he published three personal travelogues.

Brinnin taught in a number of universities over his career. At various times, he gave courses at Vassar College, Boston University, the University of Connecticut, and Harvard University. He was awarded the gold medal for Distinguished Service to Poetry from the Poetry Society of America in 1955 and the Centennial Medal for Distinction in Literature from the University of Michigan in 1963.

Brinnin died in Key West, Florida on June 25, 1998. His papers were left to the University of Delaware.

== Media portrayals ==
- In the 2014 UK Dylan Thomas television drama A Poet in New York Brinnin is portrayed by Ewen Bremner.
- Also in 2014, in the Thomas semi-biographical film Set Fire to the Stars, Brinnin is portrayed by Elijah Wood.
- In the film Dominion, John Malcolm Brinnin is portrayed by Tony Hale.

== Bibliography ==
=== Poetry ===
- The Garden is Political (1942)
- The Lincoln Lyrics (1942)
- No Arch, No Triumph (1945)
- The Sorrows of Cold Stone (1951)
- Selected Poems of John Malcolm Brinnin (1963)
- Skin Diving in the Virgins, and Other Poems (1970)

=== Works on literary figures ===
- Dylan Thomas in America (1956)
- William Carlos Williams (1963)
- Sextet: T. S. Eliot, Truman Capote and Others (1981)
- The Third Rose: Gertrude Stein and Her World (1959)
- Truman Capote: Dear Heart, Old Buddy (1981). ISBN 0-385-29509-X

=== Travelogues ===
- Beau Voyage: Life Aboard the Last Great Ships (1988)
- Travel and the Sense of Wonder (1992) link to digital edition
- The Sway of the Grand Saloon: A Social History of the North Atlantic (1971)
