= Yvonne Furneaux =

French-British actress (1926–2024)

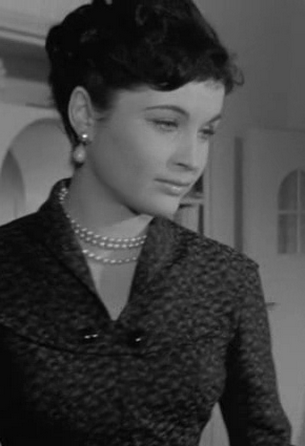
- Furneaux in Le Amiche (1955)
- Born: Elisabeth Yvonne Scatcherd; 11 May 1926; Roubaix, Nord-Pas-de-Calais, France
- Died: 5 July 2024 (aged 98); North Hampton, New Hampshire, U.S.
- Other name: Tessa Scatcherd
- Education: University of Oxford; Royal Academy of Dramatic Art
- Occupation: Actress
- Years active: 1952–1984
- Spouse: Jacques Natteau (m. 1962; died 2007)
- Children: 1

Yvonne Furneaux (born Elisabeth Yvonne Scatcherd; 11 May 1926 – 5 July 2024) was a British-French actress. A graduate of the Royal Academy of Dramatic Art, she worked with notable filmmakers like Peter Brook, Federico Fellini, Roman Polanski, Michelangelo Antonioni, and Claude Chabrol, as well as in several genre productions.

== Early life ==
Furneaux was born Elisabeth Yvonne Scatcherd to English parents living in Roubaix, northern France. Her Yorkshireman father, Joseph Scatcherd, was a director at a local branch of Lloyds Bank. Her mother, Amy Furneaux, was from Devon. She had a sister, Jeanne.

The family moved to England prior to the outbreak of World War II, and Yvonne enrolled in St Hilda's College, Oxford in 1946 to study Modern Languages, where she was known as "Tessa Scatcherd". While studying at Oxford she became involved in university theatre groups, and after graduating enrolled in the Royal Academy of Dramatic Art, which she graduated from in 1951.

== Career ==
Furneaux made her stage debut at the age of 24. She played in productions of Macbeth and The Taming of the Shrew, and was photographed by Norman Parkinson as one of "The Young Look in the Theatre" for the January 1953 issue of Vogue.

She made her film debut with a minor role in Anthony Pelissier's omnibus comedy Meet Me Tonight (1952). She subsequently played several supporting parts, including in Peter Brook's 1953 film version of The Beggar's Opera, the adventure films The Master of Ballantrae and The Dark Avenger, and the mystery film The House of the Arrow. She played the female lead in the Hammer horror film The Mummy.

In 1955, she starred in Michelangelo Antonioni's Le Amiche, which won the Silver Lion at the Venice Film Festival, and launched a successful parallel career in Italian cinema. She played Emma, the fiancée to Marcello Mastroianni's character, in Federico Fellini's La Dolce Vita and also appeared in various genre films, including several leading roles in peplum films. She also returned to her native France to star in The Count of Monte Cristo (1961) and Enough Rope (1963), both directed by Claude Autant-Lara, as well as The Champagne Murders (1967) by Claude Chabrol.

In 1965, she appeared in Roman Polanski's psychological thriller Repulsion where she played the sister of Catherine Deneuve's character.

Furneaux retired from acting in the early 1970s, only returning for the 1984 film Frankenstein's Great Aunt Tillie.

== Personal life and death ==
Furneaux was married to cinematographer Jacques Natteau, who died on 17 April 2007. They had one son, Nicholas. From 1985, she resided in Lausanne, Switzerland.

Furneaux died of complications from a stroke at her home in North Hampton, New Hampshire, on 5 July 2024, at the age of 98.

== Filmography ==
=== Film ===
Year	Title	Role	Director	Notes
1952	Meet Me Tonight	Elena	Anthony Pelissier	
1952	24 Hours of a Woman's Life	Henriette	Victor Saville	
1953	The Beggar's Opera	Jenny Diver	Peter Brook	
1953	The Master of Ballantrae	Jessie Brown	William Keighley	
1953	The House of the Arrow	Betty Harlowe	Michael Anderson	
1954	Crossed Swords	Amelia	Milton Krims	Uncredited
1955	The Dark Avenger	Marie	Henry Levin	
1955	The Prince with the Red Mask	Laura	Leopoldo Savona	
1955	Le Amiche	Momina De Stefani	Michelangelo Antonioni	
1955	Cross Channel	Jacqueline Moreau	R. G. Springsteen	
1956	Lisbon	Maria Maddalena Masanet	Ray Milland	
1959	Lui, lei e il nonno	Helen	Anton Giulio Majano	
1959	The Mummy	Isobel Banning / Princess Ananka	Terence Fisher	
1960	La Dolce Vita	Emma	Federico Fellini	
1960	Some Like It Cold	Rosalina	Steno	
1960	Run with the Devil	Marta	Mario Camerini	
1960	Il carro armato dell'8 settembre		Gianni Puccini	
1961	The Count of Monte Cristo	Mercedes	Claude Autant-Lara	
1961	Caccia all'uomo	Maria	Riccardo Freda	
1962	Charge of the Black Lancers	Jassa	Giacomo Gentilomo	
1962	Night Train to Milan	Angela	Marcello Baldi	
1963	Enough Rope	Clara	Claude Autant-Lara	
1963	I Am Semiramis	Semiramis	Primo Zeglio	
1963	I 4 tassisti	Corinna	Giorgio Bianchi	Segment: "Caccia al tesoro"
1964	The Secret of Dr. Mabuse	Gilda Larsen	Hugo Fregonese	
1964	The Lion of Thebes	Helen of Troy	Giorgio Ferroni	
1965	Repulsion	Helene Ledoux	Roman Polanski	
1967	The Champagne Murders	Christine Belling	Claude Chabrol	
1971	In the Name of the Italian People	Lavinia Santenocito	Dino Risi	
1972	Temptation in the Summer Wind	Professor's Wife	Rolf Thiele	
1984	Frankenstein's Great Aunt Tillie	Tillie Frankenstein	Myron J. Gold	

=== Television ===
Year	Title	Role	Notes
1953	Douglas Fairbanks Presents	Suzie Rochard	Episode: "The Genie"
1954	The Three Princes	Yasmin	Television film
1955	The Adventures of the Scarlet Pimpernel	Suzanne de Fleury	Episode: "The Hostage"
1956	Nom-de-Plume	The Countess	Episode: "The Courtesan"
1956	Adventure Theatre	Vanessa	Episode: "The Javanese Dagger"
1957	ITV Play of the Week	Kathi Lutterwell	Episode: "The Tigress on the Hearth"
1965	Danger Man	Lisa Lee	Episode: "A Very Dangerous Game"
1965	Hereward the Wake	Torfrida	11 episodes
1966	The Baron	Selina Travis	Episodes: "Masquerade" & "The Killing"
1966	The Man Who Never Was	Paula	Episode: "A Little Ignorance"
1969	The Last of the Powerseekers	Miss Rabier	Television film
