= Jamila Velazquez =

American actress

- Born: South Bronx, New York, U.S.
- Occupations: Actress, singer, songwriter, performer
- Years active: 2011–present

Jamila Velazquez is an American singer and actress, best known for her recurring roles as Sarita in the ABC Family series Twisted (2013–2014) and as Laura Calleros on FOX's primetime musical-drama series Empire (2015–2016).

== Early life ==
Velazquez was born in the New York City borough of the Bronx to Ecuadorian, Dominican and Puerto Rican parents. She also has a younger sister named Jada Velazquez. Her younger sister and her parents reside in New York. Velazquez was raised in the Longwood-Hunts Point section of the South Bronx. She attended Catholic School, and was enrolled in acting class by the age of six.

She began singing and performing in kindergarten. When she was eight years old she booked her first role in an off-Broadway play called "The End of You". When she was 11, she and her family moved to Rockland County, New York. She later enrolled in the Professional Performing Arts High School in Midtown Manhattan. She enrolled as a vocal major, but during her second year she switched to drama.

== Career ==
=== Acting ===
Velazquez first appeared in a 2011 movie drama Come Home Raquel, playing the lead role Raquel in 2011, a 13-year-old girl from Queens, New York.

In 2012, she guest-starred in the TV series Law & Order: Special Victims Unit in season 14, episode 4, "Acceptable Loss" as a sex worker named Pilar Morenas. In 2015, she revived the role of Pilar Morenas in season 16, episode 15 "Undercover Mother" and season 16, episode 23 "Surrendering Noah". In 2022, she was brought back to play Maya Jimenez in season 23, episode 11 "Burning with Rage Forever."

Velazquez joined the cast of the ABC Family's new series Twisted in 2013, as the role of Sarita. She is a supporting character in Twisted, former best friend of main character Lacey Porter and murdered student Regina Crane.

On August 3, 2015, it was announced that Velazquez was joining the cast as Latina girl Laura Calleros from Bronx, New York, on Fox's Empire Season 2. She is the lead singer in Lyon Dynasty's Latin-American girl group, Mirage a Trois. Laura was a recurring character through season 2, first appearing in the episode "Poor Yorick".

Velazquez had a role in the comedy-drama series Orange is the New Black in June 2016.

In 2017, she had a minor role in Chicago P.D. as Emily Vega in season 4, episode 11, "You Wish".

In 2018, she appeared in her second movie, How the Light Gets In.

In 2019, she had a minor role in The Blacklist in season 6, episode 9, "Minister D (No. 99)".

On January 1, 2020, Velazquez's new movie John Henry is set to be released.

Velazquez appeared as Meche in Steven Spielberg's adaptation of West Side Story, released on December 10, 2021. Filming commenced at the end of September in 2019.

=== Music ===
Velazquez is described as a pop/rock ballad singer. She has a wide range of taste in music. Some of her influences include, Fiona Apple, Hole, Whitney Houston, Mariah Carey, Pearl Jam, and Amanda Miguel, to name a few.

Velazquez's first original composition, the alternative/pop-rock break-up song "Nothing Like You", was released January 23, 2015. A Spanish version titled "Nada Como Tu" followed.

== Discography ==
Solo songs

Music
No.	Title	Writer(s)	Producer(s)	Length
1.	"Nothing Like You" (English Version)	Jamila Velazquez	Jamila Velazquez	3:33
2.	"Nada Como Tu" (Spanish Version)	Jamila Velazquez	Jamila Velazquez	3:33

Empire Music

Empire Music
No.	Title	Producer(s)	Length
1.	"Lago Azul" (feat. Jamila Velazquez)	Empire cast	3:59
2.	"Runnin'" (feat. Yazz, Jamila Velazquez, Raquel Castro and Yani Marin)	Empire Cast	2:56
3.	"Mimosa" (feat. Jamila Velazquez, Raquel Castro and Yani Marin)	Empire Cast	3:26
4.	"Yo Vivire" (feat. Jamila Velazquez)	Empire Cast	3:32
5.	"Miracles" (feat. Yazz and Jamila Velazquez)	Empire Cast	2:47
6.	"Crown" (feat. Jamila Velazquez, Raquel Castro and Yani Marin)	Empire Cast	3:14
7.	"All Nite" (feat. Yazz, Jamila Velazquez and Serayah)	Empire Cast	3:50

== Filmography ==
Film roles
Year	Title	Role	Notes
2011	Come Home Raquel	Raquel	
2020	John Henry	Berta	
2021	West Side Story	Meche	

TV roles and appearances
Year	Title	Role
2012, 2015,	Law & Order: Special Victims Unit	Pilar Morenas
2013–2014	Twisted	Sarita
2015–2016	Empire	Laura Calleros
2016	Orange Is the New Black	Teenage Sirena
2017	Chicago P.D.	Emily Vega
2019	The Blacklist	Homeless woman
2020	Blue Bloods	Camila Garcia
2022	Law & Order: Special Victims Unit	Maya Jimenez
2024-2025	Tales of the Teenage Mutant Ninja Turtles	Angel (voice)
