= Garnett Smith =

American film, stage and television actor

- Smith in Scarface (1983)
- Born: September 22, 1937; Richmond, Virginia, U.S.
- Died: July 24, 2025 (aged 87)
- Education: Hampden–Sydney College
- Occupation: Actor

Garnett Smith (September 22, 1937 – July 24, 2025) was an American film, stage and television actor.

Smith was the son of John H. Smith Sr., and he graduated from Hampden–Sydney College in 1960. He began his stage career in 1962, appearing in the stage play Julius Caesar. During his stage career, he appeared in such other plays as Shoemakers' Holiday, Earnest in Love, We Must Kill Tony, The Magic Show, Canterbury Tales and Scratch. In 1967, he played the stand-in of Guildenstern in the stage play Rosencrantz and Guildenstern Are Dead, and in 1972, he played Al Taylor in the stage play Dear Oscar.

Smith guest-starred in television programs including The Greatest American Hero, Moonlighting, Three's a Crowd, Knight Rider, The A-Team and Murder, She Wrote. He also appeared in films such as Scarface, Frankenstein's Great Aunt Tillie (as Lawyer Schnabel) and Lady Liberty.

Smith died on July 24, 2025, at the age of 87.
