= The Almond and the Seahorse =

2022 British drama film

- Theatrical release poster
- Directed by: Celyn Jones; Tom Stern
- Screenplay by: Kaite O'Reilly; Celyn Jones
- Based on: The Almond and the Seahorse by Kaite O'Reilly
- Produced by: Andy Evans; Sean Marley; Alex Ashworth; Alison Brister
- Starring: Rebel Wilson; Charlotte Gainsbourg; Trine Dyrholm; Celyn Jones; Alice Lowe; Ruth Madeley; Meera Syal
- Cinematography: Tom Stern
- Edited by: Mike Jones
- Music by: Gruff Rhys
- Production companies: Mad as Birds; REP Productions SF
- Distributed by: Picnik Entertainment
- Release dates: 26 September 2022 (Zurich); 10 May 2024 (United Kingdom)
- Running time: 95 minutes
- Country: United Kingdom
- Language: English
- Box office: $1,250

The Almond and the Seahorse is a 2022 British drama film directed by Celyn Jones and Tom Stern and written by Jones and Kaite O'Reilly, based on O'Reilly's 2008 stage play. It stars Rebel Wilson, Charlotte Gainsbourg, Trine Dyrholm, Jones, Alice Lowe, Ruth Madeley, and Meera Syal. The story follows the lives of two couples who deal with their loved ones who suffer from anterograde amnesia.

The film premiered at the Zurich Film Festival on 26 September 2022.

== Plot ==
Sarah, an archeologist, struggles to care for her husband, Joe, who suffers from anterograde amnesia. He has a traumatic brain injury resulting from surgery that removed a benign brain tumor two years ago. As a result, he has severe short-term memory loss, is socially disinhibited, and suffers from mood swings.

Nearby, Toni lives with her lesbian partner, Gwen, who has a similar disability. Every day, she wakes up and can't remember the last 15 years. Before sustaining a TBI in a car accident, Gwen was a cellist, but no longer plays. Toni used to work as an architect, but retired to care for Gwen fulltime. Unfortunately, Gwen grows increasingly distrustful, and is admitted to Open Field TBI Hospital as a live-in patient.

At Open Field, Dr. Falmer tells Sarah that TBI patients used to commonly die, but now the majority survive. This has caused a "silent epidemic" in which spouses and families become primary caregivers. Sarah holds out hope that Joe will recover. Falmer suggests using memory aids to improve his independence.

Sarah records a tape explaining how parts of the brain called the amygdala and hippocampus (the titular "almond" and "seahorse") allow people to create new memories. These parts of Joe's brain no longer work correctly. The tape easily explains the situation when he forgets. However, upon being retold, Joe usually grows upset and is unable to fully comprehend the truth. Memory aids, like timers and notes, fail to help him accomplish tasks. His mind is so erratic that he needs personal supervision to simply take his medication.

Toni brings Gwen's cello to the hospital. She's told by Falmer that her presence sometimes upsets Gwen, and so she leaves in a huff.

Joe's sister, Cath, suggests Sarah talk to a therapist or join a support group, but Sarah refuses. Despite longing to have children with Joe, she feels it's not possible as long as their situation remains unchanged. Sarah and Toni struggle with increasing feelings of loneliness.

Gwen starts playing her cello again. Toni, feeling she's lost too much time, ends their relationship. Falmer informs Sarah that Joe's mind is deteriorating and he will eventually lose his long-term memories. Sarah accuses Falmer of giving her false hope and storms out. Gwen encounters the distraught Sarah and tries to comfort her by suggesting she make the most of life. Falmer laments that she cannot heal the pain that her patients' loved ones endure.

Sarah and Toni meet at the hospital and sleep together that night. The next morning, Toni tells Sarah that Gwen was pregnant and lost the baby in the car accident. They continue their affair and take a trip to the seashore. However, both quickly realize neither can replace their spouses.

Toni resumes visiting Gwen. Sarah tells Cath about her affair, and how she wants the old Joe back. Cath insists that he is still present. That night, Sarah and Joe sleep together.

Five years later, Joe lives at Open Field. Gwen plays the cello in the hospital garden for an audience, including Falmer, Joe, and Toni. Sarah arrives, along with her and Joe's son. Although Joe doesn't recognize his family, he happily spends time with them. During a break in the concert, Sarah and Toni toast to being present in the moment.

== Cast ==
- Rebel Wilson as Sarah
- Charlotte Gainsbourg as Toni
- Trine Dyrholm as Gwen
- Celyn Jones as Joe
- Alice Lowe as Cath
- Ruth Madeley as Jenny
- Meera Syal as Dr. Falmer

== Production ==
In October 2020, it was announced that screenwriter and actor Celyn Jones and cinematographer Tom Stern would make their directorial debuts on The Almond and the Seahorse, a film adaptation of the stage play by Kaite O'Reilly, who also wrote the screenplay with Jones. Rebel Wilson would star in her first non-comedy film role, and Jones would also be part of the cast, reprising a role he performed in the play. In December, Charlotte Gainsbourg joined the cast.

In April 2021, it was reported that Trine Dyrholm and Meera Syal had joined the cast, and that principal photography was underway in Merseyside, England, and North Wales.

== Soundtrack ==
Gruff Rhys composed the film's score. A day before the film's theatrical release, a subsequent soundtrack album, The Almond & the Seahorse, was announced with a release date of 24 February 2023. The album debuted at no. 1 on the UK Soundtrack Albums Chart.

== Release ==
The film premiered at the Zurich Film Festival on 26 September 2022.

It was released in select theatres and VOD platforms in the United States on December 16, 2022. In March 2024, Picnik Entertainment acquired the British distribution rights to the film, and released it across the United Kingdom on 10 May 2024.

== Reception ==
On review aggregator site Rotten Tomatoes, the film has an 13% approval rating based on 15 reviews, with an average rating of 4.9/10. Metacritic reports a 42 out of 100 rating, based on four critics, indicating "mixed or average reviews".

In The Hollywood Reporter, Sheri Linden praised the performances and visuals, but criticized the story for "[feeling] told rather than explored." Amy Nicholson of The New York Times wrote that the film "plays out like an educational film strip," and the ending "is as artificially rosy as a bag of seaside taffy." Dennis Harvey's review in Variety had similar critiques, writing the film was "an uneven stage-play adaptation," with "capable actors" that struggled to find their characters. Harvey concluded, "This isn’t a bad film... But one suspects whatever strengths 'The Almond and the Seahorse' had onstage have been significantly diluted in a translation that stretches clumsily to suit its new medium."
