= Madfabulous =

British historical drama film

- Theatrical release poster
- Directed by: Celyn Jones
- Screenplay by: Lisa Baker
- Produced by: Nadia Jaynes; Sean Marley
- Starring: Callum Scott Howells; Ruby Stokes; Rupert Everett; Paul Rhys; Siobhán McSweeney
- Cinematography: Laurie Rose
- Edited by: Kevin Jones
- Music by: Dan Baboulene
- Production companies: Mad as Birds; Picnik Entertainment; Creative Wales; Ffilm Cymru Wales
- Distributed by: Icon Film Distribution
- Release dates: 25 March 2026 (LLGBTIQFF); 5 June 2026 (United Kingdom)
- Running time: 108 minutes
- Country: United Kingdom
- Language: English

Madfabulous is a 2026 British historical drama film about Henry, 5th Marquess of Anglesey, directed by Celyn Jones and starring Rupert Everett, Ruby Stokes and Callum Scott Howells, with supporting cast members including Paul Rhys, Siobhán McSweeney, Tom Rhys Harries and Julian Lewis Jones.

== Premise ==
Set in the late 19th century, the 5th Marquess of Anglesey is a flamboyant peer whose behaviour and extravagance has modern echoes.

== Cast ==
- Callum Scott Howells as Henry, 5th Marquess of Anglesey
- Ruby Stokes as Lily
- Rupert Everett as Gelert
- Paul Rhys as Lord Penrhyn
- Louis Hynes as Neville
- Louise Brealey as Lady Chetwynd
- Tom Rhys Harries as Nick Durant
- Siobhán McSweeney as Blanche
- Julian Lewis Jones as Viscount of Gwynedd
- Clara Paget as Mabel
- Guillaume Gallienne
- Steve Speirs
- Kevin Eldon
- Ian Puleston-Davies
- Roger Evans
- Lisa Jên Brown
- Leisa Gwenllian

== Production ==
The film is directed by Celyn Jones and produced by Mad as Birds. It is scripted by Lisa Baker in her feature film debut. Producers are Nadia Jaynes and Sean Marley while executive producer is Nicola Pearcey of Picnik Entertainment. Support comes from Ffilm Cymru Wales and the Welsh Government via Creative Wales.

Callum Scott Howells joined the cast in May 2024 as Henry, 5th Marquess of Anglesey. Ruby Stokes and Rupert Everett joined the cast in August 2024.

Principal photography got underway in Wales in August 2024 with filming locations including Anglesey, Caernarfon and Pwllheli.

== Release ==
The film had its world premiere at the BFI Flare: London LGBTIQ+ Film Festival on 25 March 2026, before being released theatrically in the United Kingdom on 5 June, by Icon Film Distribution. A short film titled Access Denied was attached to theatrical screenings of Madfabulous.

== Reception ==
In September 2026, the film received six nominations at the BAFTA Cymru Awards, but failed to win any of its categories.
