= John Hus (1977 film) =

- Directed by: Michael Oconomou
- Written by: Richard Morean
- Starring: Rod Colbin; Regis Cordic; Marvin Miller; Sándor Naszódy; Carmen Zapata
- Music by: William Tasker
- Release date: 1977
- Running time: 55 min
- Country: United States
- Language: English

John Hus is a 1977 American film biography of the 14th-century Czech church reformer Jan Hus, directed by Michael Economou. The film was produced by Faith For Today Ministries, the creators of a Christian TV program of the same name.

The film featured Rod Colbin in the title role.
