= Maurice Fadida =

American film producer

- Occupation: Film producer
- Known for: Kodiak Pictures; The Trial of the Chicago 7 (executive producer)

Maurice Fadida is an American film producer known for executive producing films such as The Trial of the Chicago 7 (Golden Globe Award winner), John Henry (which reached number one on Netflix), and Bloodshot, and for founding Kodiak Pictures.

== Career ==
In 2015, Fadida produced the Amazon Prime original series Borderline.

After founding Kodiak Pictures, in 2017, Fadida was the executive producer for the comedy The Clapper, starring Ed Helms and Amanda Seyfried, which went on to premiere at the Tribeca Film Festival.

Later, in 2018, he produced The Vanishing, a thriller starring Gerard Butler and Peter Mullan, who was later nominated for a BAFTA Award for his performance. Soon after this, he went on to partner with Will and Jada Pinkett Smith's distribution company Telepool to produce a slate of genre films. In 2019, Fadida also signed on to produce a thriller that was expected to be directed by actress Bella Thorne.

The first picture on that slate was the film John Henry, which reached number one on Netflix's top 10 most watched titles after its 2020 release. Fadida's other productions in 2020 included executive producing David Ayer's action thriller The Tax Collector, starring Shia LaBeouf and the Valiant comic book adaptation Bloodshot, starring Vin Diesel. At the start of the COVID-19 pandemic in 2020, Fadida, together with his partners, became one of the few producers to have successfully wrapped a feature film shoot during the COVID-19 lockdown.

In October 2020, Fadida entered into a deal with Cross Creek Media, through which he served as an executive producer on The Trial of the Chicago 7, which went on to win a Golden Globe Award for best original screenplay and be nominated for six Academy Awards.

In February 2021, Fadida worked with the Israeli company Meitav Dash to support production for films and television shows. Shortly thereafter, his horror films Offseason and Witch Hunt, which he produced with Defiant Studios, both premiered at the SXSW Film Festival.

== Filmography ==
Films produced by Maurice Fadida:

Year	Title	Role
2015	Muse (short)	Producer
2017	All I Wish	Executive Producer
2017	The Clapper	Executive Producer
2018	First We Take Brooklyn	Executive Producer
2018	Gotti	Executive Producer
2018	Monster Party	Executive Producer
2018	The Vanishing	Producer
2020	Deported	Producer
2020	The Tax Collector	Executive Producer
2020	John Henry	Producer
2020	Bloodshot	Executive Producer
2020	The Trial of the Chicago 7	Executive Producer
2021	Witch Hunt	Producer
2021	Offseason	Producer
2021	Phobias	Producer
2024	1992	Producer
TBA	The Knocking	Producer
TBA	Rise	Producer
TBA	No Running	Producer
TBA	Night Shift	Producer
