= Jacques Natteau =

French director of photography (1920–2007)

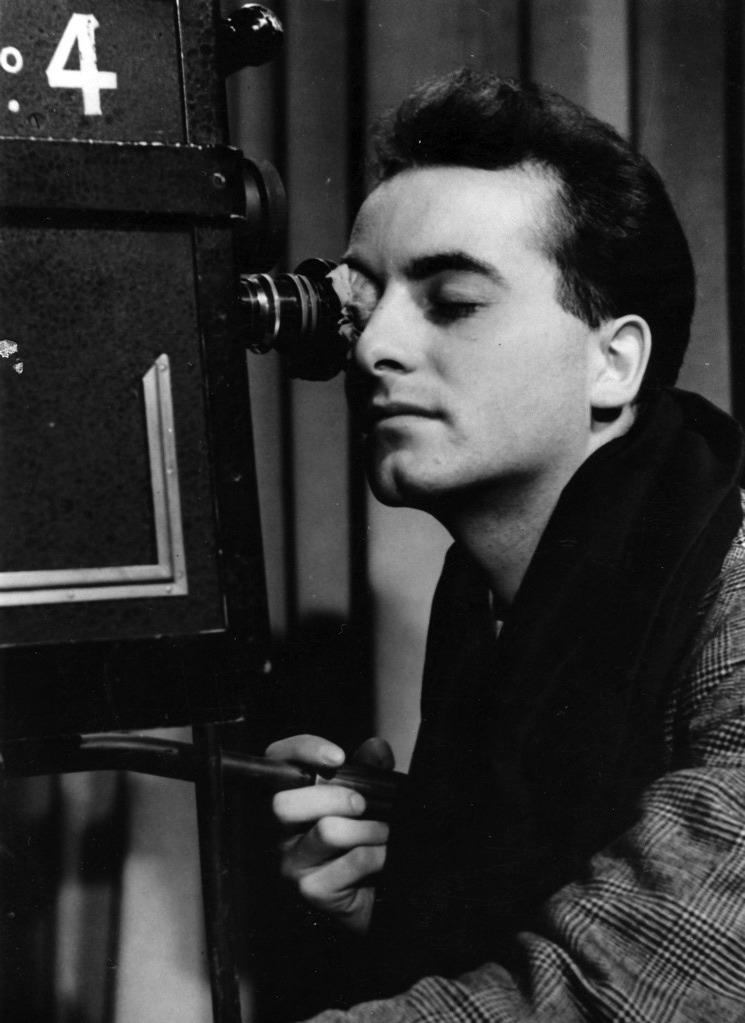
- Natteau behind the camera
- Born: Jacques Etienne Chiuminatto; 15 November 1920; Istanbul, Turkey
- Died: 17 April 2007 (aged 86); Lausanne, Switzerland
- Occupation: Director of photography
- Spouse: Genevieve Langevin (m. 1942; div. 1953) Yvonne Furneaux (m. 1962–2007)
- Children: Catherine Breguet (1943–80) Nicholas Natteau

Jacques Natteau (15 November 1920 – 17 April 2007) was a French director of photography.

== Early life ==
Natteau was born on 15 November 1920 in Istanbul, Turkey. His father, Edouard Chiuminatto, was a captain in the French Army who had fought in World War I and was wounded multiple times in the battles of the Somme, Chemin des Dames, and Verdun. After World War I, his father was dispatched as part of the Allied occupation force to Turkey, where he met Rosine Foscolo, a direct descendant of the 19th century Italian poet, Ugo Foscolo. Edouard and Rosine married and gave birth to their only child, Jacques Etienne Chiuminatto. Under the terms of the 1919 Versailles Treaty, the defeated Ottoman Empire, as an ally of Imperial Germany, surrendered and was occupied by Anglo-French forces. The French Army seized Turkey's railways and Edouard was put in charge of administering the railway network.

When Natteau was three years old, Kemal Atatürk came to power and ended the Allied occupation of Turkey. The family settled in Paris, France, and the young Jacques Natteau won admittance to Paris's prestigious Lycée Henri IV where he graduated in 1938 earning his Baccalauréat. He later remembered that, on 4 February 1934, he literally ran for his life as violent riots broke out in Paris prior to the collapse of the French government.

Growing up in Paris's artistic 6ème arrondissement in the 1930s, Natteau came to know some of its most successful residents including Jean Cocteau, Jacques Prévert, Jean-Paul Sartre, Simone de Beauvoir, Albert Camus, Pablo Picasso.

=== World War II ===
In 1939, on the eve of World War II, Edouard, haunted by the horrendous slaughter he had seen as a foot soldier in the bloody Battle of Verdun, persuaded his son to join the French Air Force. In the summer of 1939, Jacques Natteau enlisted in the air force with his Lycée Henri IV friends, many of whom were scions of the French nobility: Jean-Marie de Premontville, Armagnac, Raoul de Vibray, and Prince Louis Murat (direct descendant of Joachim Murat, Napoleon's famous cavalry general).

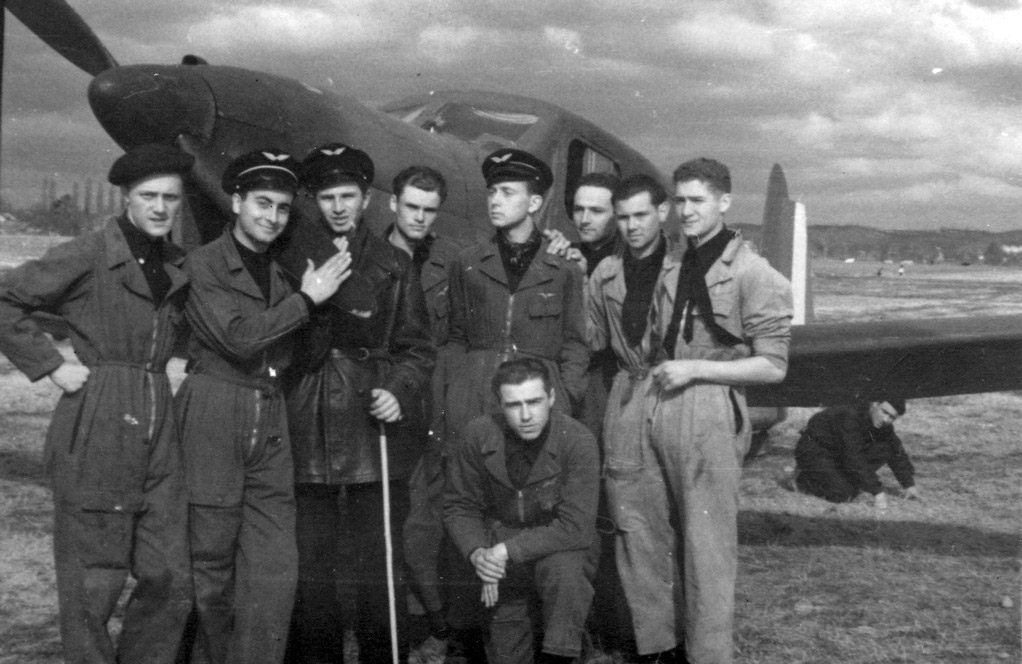
Jacques Natteau (2nd from left touching Prince Murat) on the command of his unit during the World War II

By the time Natteau and his friends had earned their wings as fighter pilots, the Franco-German Phoney War (September 1939 – May 1940) and the Battle of France and Hitler's victorious blitzkrieg against the West (May–June 1940) had all but ended. But as fighter pilots, they had engaged German and Italian enemy fighters on multiple occasions. On one occasion Natteau, flying a Morane-Saulnier M.S.406 fighter, engaged three Italian fighter pilots who were strafing French civilians on the road. He shot down two and the third escaped.

Upon France's collapse in 1940, Jacques Natteau linked up with the Royal Air Force and fought in the Battle of Britain. His exploits earned him the Distinguished Flying Cross and the French Legion of Honor.

== Career ==
In 1938, the legendary French film director, Jean Renoir, gave him his first job as assistant camera man for the film La Bête humaine. However, his career was interrupted by the onset of World War II.

After the war, he resumed his career in the late 1940s and went on to become one of Europe's most famous cinematographers in the 1950s and 1960s. Natteau was the favoured cinematographer for Claude Autant-Lara.

He served as cinematographer for such French directors including Jean Renoir, Claude Autant-Lara, Marc Allégret, Marcel Carné and Jules Dassin. Among the films to his credit as cinematographer are He Who Must Die, Never on Sunday, Phaedra, and Le Comte de Monte Cristo. Claude Autant-Lara

== Personal life ==
Natteau was married twice, first in 1942 to Geneviève Langevin, with whom he had a daughter, Catherine; the couple divorced in 1953. In 1961, while working on Le Comte de Monte Cristo, he met actress Yvonne Furneaux. They lived between London, Paris, and Rome in the 1960s as they continued to pursue their film careers. They were married from 1962 until his death. He had two children: Catherine with Geneviève and Nicholas Natteau, a director and producer, with Yvonne. Catherine and her only child Alexandre were murdered in 1980 by her estranged ex-husband Maxime Breguet who then committed suicide.

== Death ==
Jacques Natteau died of pneumonia while traveling in Lausanne, Switzerland, on 17 April 2007, aged 86.

== Filmography ==
- Mollenard, 1938 (assistant camera) ... aka Hatred
- La Bête humaine, 1938 (assistant camera) (as Natteau) ... aka The Human Beast
- Sarajevo, 1940 (camera operator) (as Natteau) ... aka From Mayerling to Sarajevo (US: video title)
- Le bal des passants, 1944 (camera operator)
- Les malheurs de Sophie, 1946 (camera operator)
- Le Comédien, 1948 (camera operator) ... aka The Private Life of an Actor
- L'Héroïque Monsieur Boniface, 1949 (camera operator) ... aka The Heroic Mr. Boniface (International: English title)
- Occupe-toi d'Amélie..!, 1949 (camera operator)
- L'école buissonnière, 1949 (camera operator – as J. Natteau)
- Un chant d'amour, 1950 ... aka A Song of Love (US)
- L' Auberge rouge, 1951 ... aka The Red Inn (US)
- Sans laisser d'adresse, 1951 (camera operator)
- L'aiguille rouge, 1951 (camera operator)
- Les Sept péchés capitaux, 1952 (segment "Pride") ... aka The Seven Deadly Sins (UK) (US)
- La P... respectueuse, 1952 (camera operator) ... aka The Respectful Prostitute
- La neige était sale, 1954 (camera operator) ... aka Stain on the Snow
- Le Blé en herbe, 1954 (camera operator) ... aka The Game of Love (US)
- Casta diva, 1954 (assistant director)
- Marguerite de la nuit, 1955 ... aka Marguerite of the Night (US: literal English title)
- La Traversée de Paris, 1956 ... aka Four Bags Full (US)
- Celui qui doit mourir, 1957 ... aka He Who Must Die (US)
- Les Misérables, 1958 ... aka The Miserable Ones (US)
- En cas de malheur, 1958 ... aka Love Is My Profession (US)
- Le Joueur, 1958 ... aka The Gambler
- Un drôle de dimanche, 1958 ... aka Sunday Encounter (US: TV title)
- La Jument verte, 1959 ... aka The Green Mare (US)
- Normandie-Niémen, 1960
- Jamais le dimanche, 1960 ... aka Never on Sunday (US)
- Le Bois des amants, 1960 ... aka Between Love and Duty (UK)
- Tu ne tueras point, 1961 ... aka Thou Shalt Not Kill
- Vive Henri IV... vive l'amour!, 1961 ... aka Long Live Henry IV... Long Live Love! (US: literal English title)
- Le Comte de Monte Cristo, 1961 ...aka The Count of Monte Cristo (US)
- Phaedra, 1962 (director of photography)
- Le Magot de Josefa, 1963 ... aka Josefa's Loot (International: English title)
- Du mouron pour les petits oiseaux, 1963 ... aka Chicken Feed for Little Birds (International: English title)
- Le Meurtrier, 1963 ... aka Enough Rope (UK) (US)
- Le Scandale, 1967 (associate producer) ... aka The Champagne Murders (US)
- Les oiseaux vont mourir au Pérou, 1968 (producer) ... aka Birds in Peru (US)
