= John Henry (2020 film) =

- Theatrical release poster
- Directed by: Will Forbes
- Written by: Doug Skinner; Will Forbes
- Produced by: Maurice Fadida; Eric B. Fleischman; Brian Kavanaugh-Jones
- Starring: Terry Crews; Jamila Velazquez; J.J. Soria; Ken Foree; Chris "Ludacris" Bridges
- Cinematography: Isiah Donte Lee
- Edited by: Joe Rosenbloom
- Music by: Will Forbes; DJ Quik
- Production companies: Defiant Studios; Automatik
- Distributed by: Saban Films
- Release date: January 24, 2020 (United States)
- Running time: 91 minutes
- Country: United States
- Language: English

John Henry is a 2020 American thriller drama film starring Terry Crews and Ludacris, and directed by Will Forbes. Inspired by the folk lore of John Henry, the plot follows an ex-gang member from Los Angeles who must help two immigrant children who are on the run from his former crime boss. The film had a limited release on January 24, 2020, and received negative reviews from critics with a 0% Rotten Tomatoes score.

== Plot ==
Berta, a Honduran refugee, is about to be raped by the Los Angeles street gang that kidnapped her. Her brother Oscar and half-brother Emilio assault the house where she is being kept and free her, but Oscar is shot before they can escape. Emilio, who believes Oscar to be dead, forces Berta to leave with him, then delays the police as she flees.

Berta hides under the front porch of a nearby house owned by John Henry, a large, quiet man. John takes her in over the objections of his father BJ who reluctantly helps translate her story. Although BJ mocks his sentimentality, John offers to help her.

Eventually, Emilio arrives at John's house, looking for Berta. Emilio, an American, explains that he was on the way to drop off his half-siblings at a shelter when Berta was kidnapped. Disgusted that Emilio was planning to ditch his family, BJ becomes closer to Berta. Berta insists that they return to the gangsters' house to look for Oscar, but Emilio insists that Oscar is dead. After Emilio describes a tattoo, John realizes that the gangsters are part of a crew run by his cousin Hell.

Back in the 1990s, John quit the gang after realizing Hell's ambition would never allow the cycle of violence to end. John contacts Hell, who gives Emilio and Berta 24 hours to leave the city.

Hell betrays them and sends assassins to kill everyone in the house, though they are instructed to leave John alive long enough that he can watch Hell execute Berta. BJ and Emilio both die protecting Berta, but ride-or-die chick Savage botches Hell's plans when she stops John from assaulting Hell. Enraged, Hell leaves John for dead and orders Savage to be killed. John reasons that Hell, who never leaves anyone alive at the scene of a crime, wants him to suffer further. John accidentally shot and maimed Hell when they were teenagers, and John now refuses to use pistols.

After recovering, John grabs a sledgehammer and leaves to rescue Berta, whom he believes Hell still plans to kill in front of him. John's grandmother initially refuses to give him Hell's address but finally acknowledges that Hell is beyond redemption. John kills several gangsters with his sledgehammer, interrupting Savage's execution and leaving Hell short on muscle. Hell grants Savage a reprieve and orders her to kill John. Although conflicted, she confronts John, who cripples her and leaves her alive.

The final confrontation between John and Hell draws a crowd. Taking advantage of this, Hell brings out Berta and Oscar, whose public executions he believes will demonstrate his dominance. Although the rest of the neighborhood is scared, a boy named Deydey defies Hell and assists John. Savage kills Hell's remaining bodyguard while John kills Hell, then collapses as Berta thanks him for rescuing her and Oscar.

== Cast ==
- Terry Crews as John Henry
  - Rich Morrow as Young John Henry
- Jalyn Hall as "Deydey"
- Ludacris as "Hell"
  - Maestro Harrell as Young "Hell"
- Jamila Velazquez as Berta
- Ken Foree as B.J. Henry
- Tyler Alvarez as Oscar
- Joseph Julian Soria as Emilio
- Gerald 'Slink' Johnson as "Gun"
- Dohn Norwood as "Midnight"
- Kimberly Hébert Gregory as Tasha
- Brody Hoover as Officer Kevin Towle
- Daffany McGaray Clark as Savage
- Lyne Odums as Gram
- Yakira Chambers as Deydey's Mother

== Production ==
Terry Crews and Ludacris signed on as lead characters in May 2018, alongside Jamila Velazquez, Ken Foree, Tyler Alvarez and Joseph Julian Soria.

The film is produced by Eric B. Fleischman's Defiant Studios, Brian Kavanaugh-Jones' Automatik and Maurice Fadida's Kodiak Pictures.

On May 21, 2018, principal photography for the film began in Los Angeles, California. Fadida described it as a "micro-budget movie".

== Release ==
The film was released in limited theaters on January 24, 2020, in the United States. DVD and video on demand was released in March 2020. It began to stream on Netflix on May 11, 2020, at one point reaching the number-two most-popular title on the service.

== Reception ==
On Rotten Tomatoes, the film holds a rare approval rating of 0% based on 21 reviews, with an average rating of 3.4/10. On Metacritic, the film has a weighted average score of 27 out of 100, based on 5 critics, indicating "generally unfavorable" reviews.

Michael Rechtshaffen of the Los Angeles Times wrote: "Not that there was any expectation of cinematic gold being spun here, but director and co-writer Will Forbes never achieves any satisfying sense of momentum, interrupting the occasional burst of cartoonish violence with ponderous stretches of banter straining at QT irreverence." Writing for The Hollywood Reporter, John DeFore said: "Clearly qualified in the physique department, Crews is an actor with enough charisma and range to carry either gritty genre adventures or more cartoony showdowns; but Forbes' tonal uncertainty and a stiff script leave him stranded here, in a world that lacks the gravity to put his conscience-driven reticence in context." Jeannette Catsoulis of the New York Times called the film "a big slice of ham" and said: "The occasional witty line must fight to the death with a soundtrack that flips from flamenco guitars to hustling rap, depending on which ethnicity is onscreen, and ends with a spaghetti-western flourish."

== Possible sequel ==
After the film's initial success on Netflix, Fadida and Fleischman both expressed their interest in a second film.

== See also ==
- List of films with a 0% rating on Rotten Tomatoes
- List of hood films
