= Kaila Colbin =

American-New Zealand entrepreneur and speaker

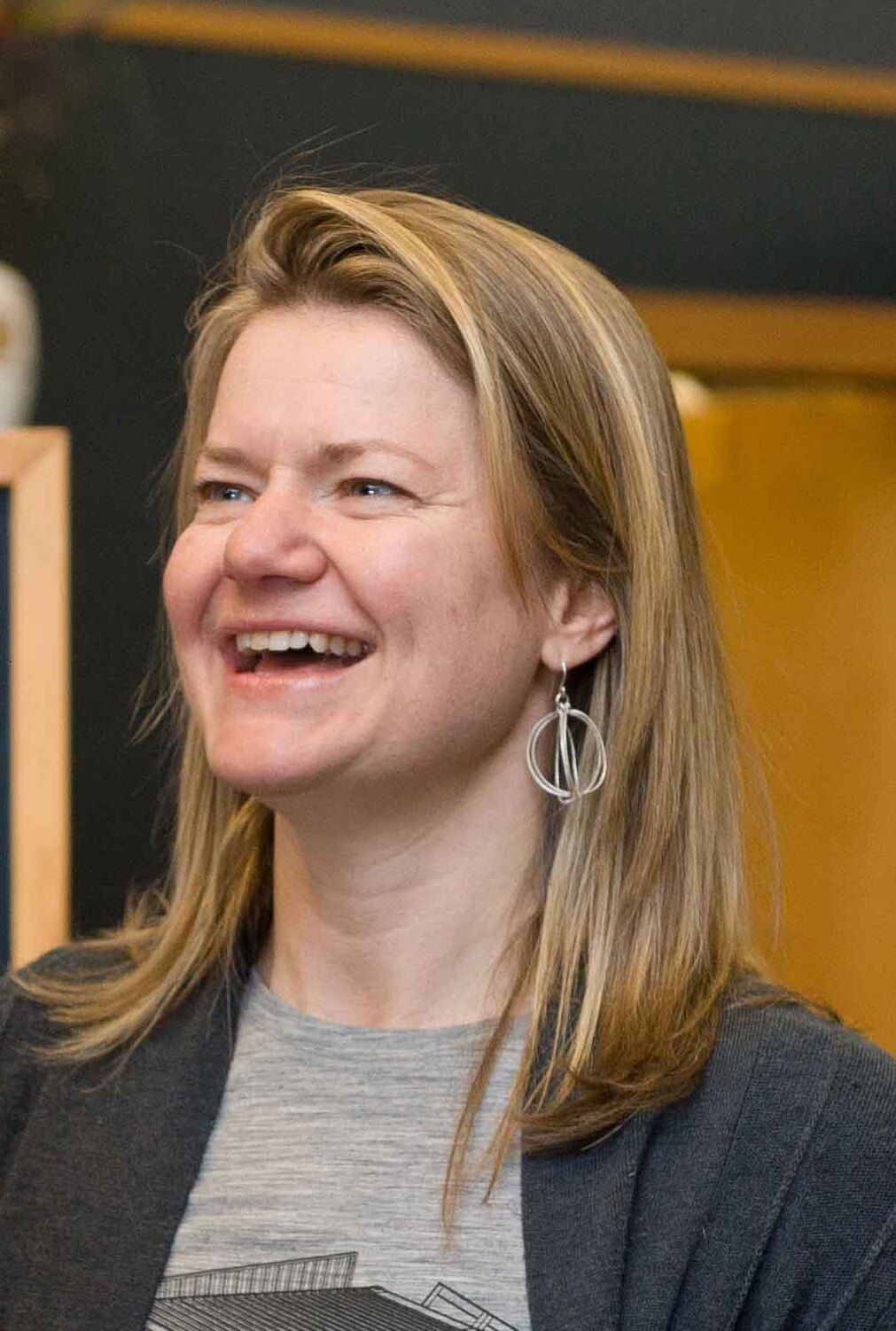
- Colbin in 2012
- Born: Kaila Johanna Colbin; 1973 or 1974 (age 52–53); New York City, United States
- Education: Cornell University
- Occupations: Chief executive officer, entrepreneur, public speaker
- Partner: Michael O'Dea (div. 2012)
- Father: Rod Colbin
- Website: kailacolbin.com

Kaila Johanna Colbin (born 1973 or 1974) is an American-New Zealand entrepreneur and public speaker, known for her work in the professional development and leadership space. She is a co-founder of Boma Global and the founder and chief executive of Boma New Zealand, a company which runs online courses and programmes for businesspeople.

Colbin became prominent in Christchurch for her work following the 2011 Christchurch earthquake. She organised the first TEDx event in the city, attended by experts in rebuilding damaged infrastructure, and was the first curator and licensee for TEDxChristchurch and TEDxScottBase, the former which she ran for over 10 years. Colbin also co-founded the Ministry of Awesome, an organisation supporting Christchurch startups.

In addition to Boma New Zealand, Colbin was the curator and ambassador for the Australasian summits of SingularityU. She is the founder and manager of Missing Link, a social media consultancy, and has held various board positions, including for ChristchurchNZ, Ministry of Awesome, CORE Education, and as the chair of the Natural Gourmet Institute for Health and Culinary Arts in New York. Colbin was also the chief marketing officer for MiniMonos, a defunct virtual-world game for children developed in New Zealand. In 2022, she was the winner of the 'Kea Friend of New Zealand World Class Award' for her work.

== Early and personal life ==
Kaila Johanna Colbin was born in New York to father Rod Colbin, an actor and fencing instructor, and mother Annemarie, an author and specialist in health foods who founded the Natural Gourmet Institute for Health and Culinary Arts in 1977. Her mother was born in Holland and lived in Argentina before emigrating to the US. Colbin grew up mainly in New York with her sister, supported by Annemarie's income from the culinary school. She also has a sister who died in an apartment fire aged four, before Colbin was born. Her stepfather was an investigative journalist for Associated Press.

Colbin claims she was the victim of an attempted kidnapping at the age of 4, while on the streets of New York. She has said it was a "random" incident that was thwarted by bystanders.

Colbin is passionate about mathematics and excelled at the subject in secondary school. At the age of 14, Colbin began learning languages and spent time overseas in Italy; she can speak English, Spanish, French and Italian, and has said she is studying te reo Māori. Colbin attended Cornell University and graduated with a degree in Hotel and Restaurant Administration, but promptly decided she didn't want to work in hospitality. She moved to Miami and started a string of businesses with minimal success, and began working in sales.

Colbin briefly spent time in Florida, and also Colorado, where she met her partner, Michael O'Dea. After a year together, he expressed a desire to move back to New Zealand. In 2005, Colbin emigrated with O'Dea to Christchurch, New Zealand and subsequently became a citizen. The couple split in 2012 on good terms, according to Colbin. In New Zealand, Colbin became involved in successful ventures including her social media consulting company Missing Link. In the late 2000s, she also worked in marketing and advertising for other companies.

== Ventures and projects ==
=== TEDxChristchurch (2010–2021) ===
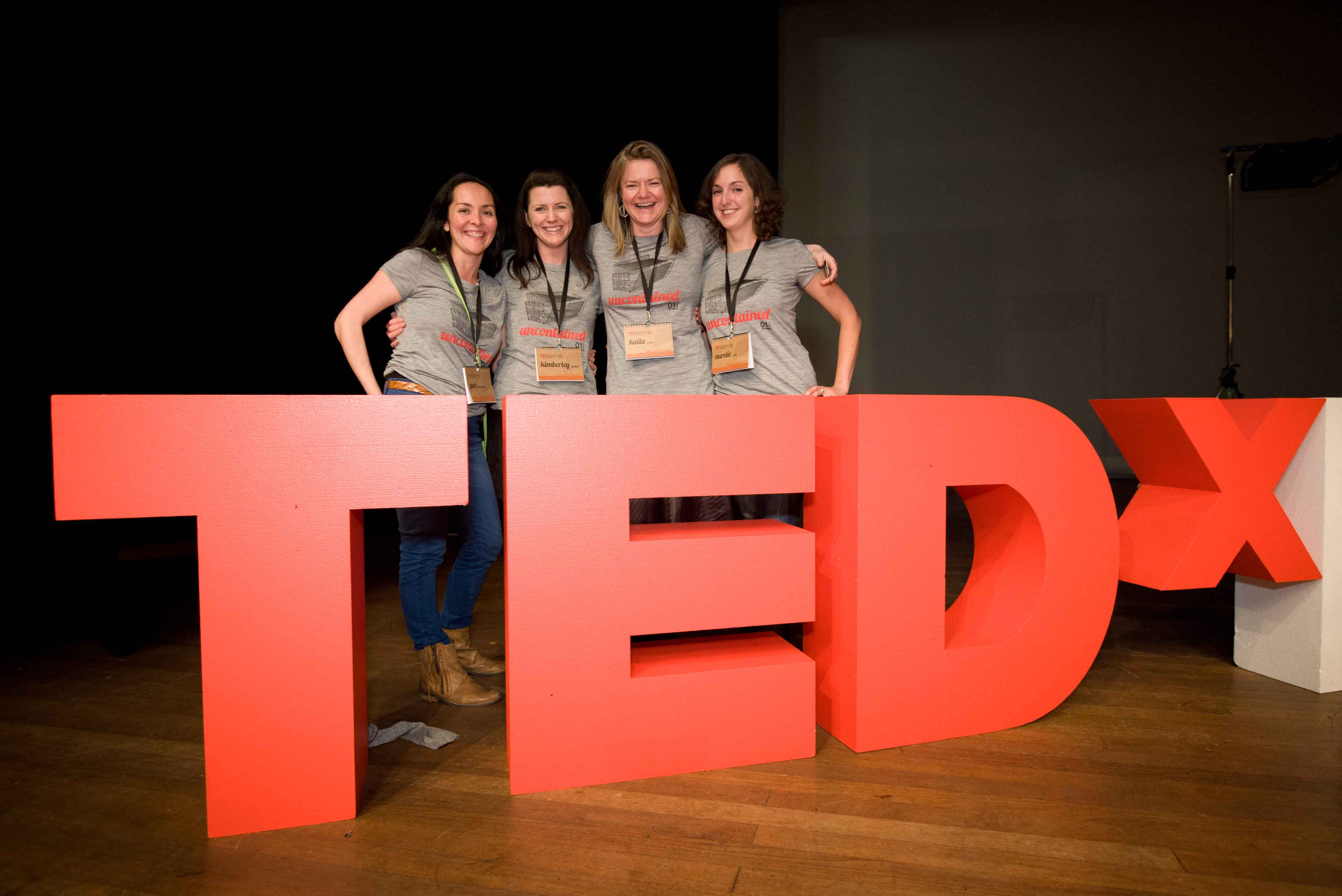
Colbin (second from right) at the 2012 TEDxEQCHCH

Colbin was the first curator and licensee for TEDxChristchurch. She became interested in the idea in 2009, initially wanting to talk at a TEDx event. When TEDx announced their licensing programme, Colbin applied for the event after discussions with family and colleagues. The first event was held in October 2010.

Colbin was in Florida to speak at a TED event when the 2011 Christchurch earthquake occurred, and described feeling helpless watching the situation unfold on the news. She promptly changed her TED speech to be about Christchurch, then returned to the city to focus on the rebuild effort and organise a local TEDx event.

The first earthquake-oriented event was held in May 2011, named TEDxEQChCh. It was credited for bringing global attention to Christchurch's rebuild effort, and attracted guests such as Art Agnos, former mayor of San Francisco who led the city through the aftermath of the 1989 Loma Prieta earthquake. The quake event was revived in 2012, before TEDxChristchurch resumed its usual format in 2013. In 2016, Colbin curated TEDxScottbase, which took place in January 2017 and marked 60 years of New Zealand's scientific activities at Scott base and Antarctica.

In August 2021, Colbin left the project, and the TEDxChristchurch license was made available for acquisition.

=== Ministry of Awesome (2012–2023) ===
Colbin co-founded the non-profit Ministry of Awesome in 2012, where she was subsequently both a trustee and chairperson. The project was created to develop a vision for post-earthquake Christchurch, and was co-founded by community leaders including Kimberly Gilmour, Sacha McMeeking, Vicki Buck, Sam Johnson and Julian Cone.

In the late 2010s, demand for Ministry of Awesome services grew, particularly with respect to entrepreneurial services and the startup ecosystem. In the early 2020s, the organisation pivoted to supporting the greater Canterbury region, and increased its focus on incubator programmes for business, social enterprises, and mentoring.

From 2019 to 2022, the Ministry of Awesome helped develop 114 startups and raised NZ$40m for projects. In 2023, Colbin left the organisation.

=== Boma New Zealand (2018–present) ===
Colbin is the co-founder of Boma Global, and the founder and chief executive of Boma New Zealand. The New Zealand branch was launched in Christchurch in July 2018, and describes itself as an education provider, running professional development workshop and programmes to foster innovative leadership.

=== Other work ===
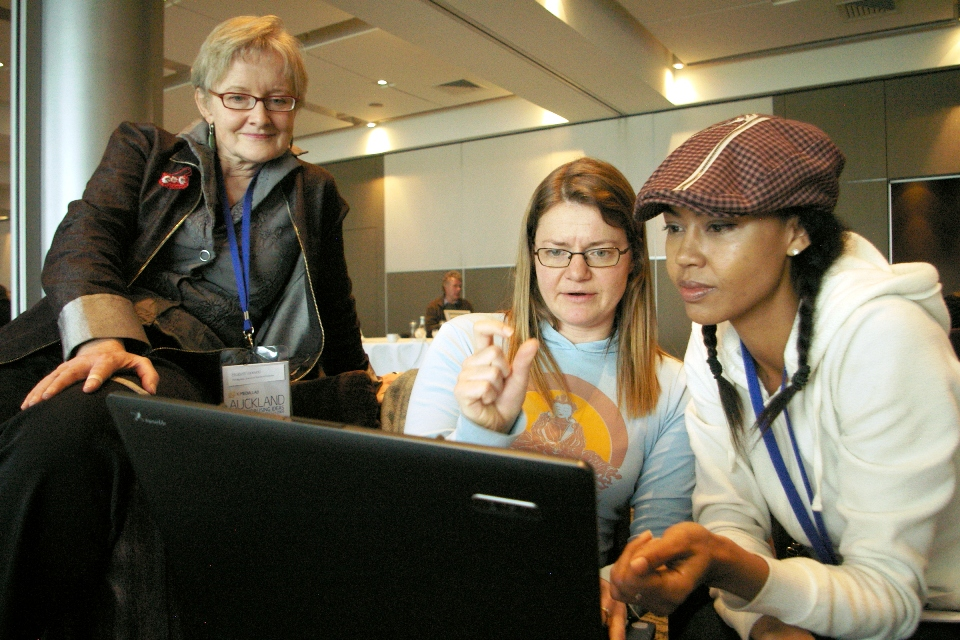
Colbin (middle) at X|Media|Lab Auckland, May 2009

Colbin is the founder and managing director of Missing Link, a social media consultancy company. In 2011, Colbin launched ReImagine Christchurch, an online forum for discussing the future of post-quake Christchurch. Colbin was formerly a contributor for MediaPost, a marketing and advertising company, and spent four years as Chief Marketing Officer for Wellington-based MiniMonos, a virtual-world game for children, before leaving to focus on her Christchurch projects.

Colbin has held various board positions, including as chair for the Natural Gourmet Institute for Health and Culinary Arts, founded by her mother. Colbin was formerly on the board of ChristchurchNZ as deputy chair, but chose to step down to avoid a conflict of interest with Ministry of Awesome, Missing Link Consultants and Boma NZ. She was also the deputy chair of CORE Education Ltd and chair of Ministry of Awesome.

In 2015, Colbin became the curator and ambassador for the New Zealand branch of Singularity University, and went on to organise the SingularityU Australia Summit in 2018.

Colbin has given numerous public talks, and describes herself as a "serial entrepreneur" and "international public speaker".
