= Set Fire to the Stars =

- Official poster
- Directed by: Andy Goddard
- Written by: Andy Goddard; Celyn Jones
- Produced by: Andy Evans; Andrew Riach; Elijah Wood
- Starring: Elijah Wood; Celyn Jones; Steven Mackintosh; Kevin Eldon; Maimie McCoy; Steve Spiers; Richard Brake; Shirley Henderson; Kelly Reilly
- Cinematography: Chris Seager
- Edited by: Mike Jones
- Music by: Gruff Rhys
- Production companies: Mad as Birds; Masnomis
- Distributed by: Munro Film Services
- Release dates: 23 June 2014 (EIFF); 7 November 2014
- Running time: 97 minutes
- Country: United Kingdom
- Language: English

Set Fire to the Stars is a 2014 Welsh semi-biographical drama film directed by Andy Goddard in his directorial debut. Co-written by Goddard and Celyn Jones, the film stars Elijah Wood as poet John M. Brinnin and Jones as Dylan Thomas with supporting roles by Kelly Reilly, Steven Mackintosh, Shirley Henderson, and Kevin Eldon. The film was produced by Mad as Birds and released in the United Kingdom on 7 November 2014.

== Premise ==
In 1950s New York, Harvard University graduate and aspiring poet John Malcolm Brinnin (Elijah Wood) embarks on a week-long retreat to save his hero, acclaimed Welsh poet Dylan Thomas (Celyn Jones).

== Cast ==
- Elijah Wood as John Malcolm Brinnin
- Celyn Jones as Dylan Thomas
- Shirley Henderson as Shirley
- Kelly Reilly as Caitlin Thomas
- Steven Mackintosh as Jack
- Andrew Bicknell as Loomis
- Kate Drew as Janet
- Adam Gillen as Harvey
- Nicola Duffett as Lady Lye
- Steve Spiers as Mickey
- Ken Drury as Doctor
- Maimie McCoy as Rosie
- Richard Brake as Mr. Unlucky
- Polly Hemingway as Ms. Missy 1
- Sue Maund as Ms. Missy 2
- Kevin Eldon as Stanley
- Weston Gavin as Edgar S. Furniss

== Music ==
The film's original score was composed by the Welsh musician Gruff Rhys. On 30 September 2016, soundtrack album was released through Twisted Nerve Records.

== Release ==
Set Fire to the Stars premiered at the 2014 Edinburgh Film Festival.

== Reception ==
On Rotten Tomatoes the film holds a 58% rating based on 43 reviews. The site's consensus states: "Set Fire to the Stars doesn't quite do justice to its legendary real-life protagonist, but thanks to Celyn Jones' spirited performance, it occasionally comes close." On Metacritic, the film has a 49 out of 100 rating based on 14 critics, indicating "mixed or average reviews".
