= Poms (film) =

- Theatrical release poster
- Directed by: Zara Hayes
- Screenplay by: Shane Atkinson
- Story by: Zara Hayes; Shane Atkinson
- Produced by: Rose Ganguzza; Celyn Jones; Sean Marley; Kelly McCormick; Ade Shannon; Andy Evans
- Starring: Diane Keaton; Jacki Weaver; Pam Grier; Celia Weston; Alisha Boe; Phyllis Somerville; Charlie Tahan; Bruce McGill; Rhea Perlman
- Cinematography: Tim Orr
- Edited by: Annette Davey
- Music by: Deborah Lurie
- Production companies: Entertainment One; Sierra Pictures; Mad as Birds; Rose Pictures
- Distributed by: STX Entertainment
- Release date: May 10, 2019 (United States)
- Running time: 90 minutes
- Country: United States
- Language: English
- Budget: $10 million
- Box office: $17.9 million

Poms is a 2019 American comedy film directed by Zara Hayes, starring Diane Keaton, Jacki Weaver, Pam Grier, Celia Weston, Alisha Boe, Phyllis Somerville (in her final film role), Charlie Tahan, Bruce McGill, and Rhea Perlman. The film follows a group of women from a retirement community who decide to start a cheerleading squad.

Poms was theatrically released in North America on May 10, 2019, by STX Entertainment. It received generally negative reviews from critics and grossed $17.9 million on a $10 million budget.

== Plot ==
Martha, a woman dying of cancer, decides to forego further treatment, and relocates from her apartment in New York to a retirement community called Sun Springs in Georgia. When Martha arrives at Sun Springs, she meets community supervisor Vicki, who gives Martha a tour of the community, where she explains that every resident must belong to one of the community's clubs.

Martha moves into her new house and promptly meets her next door neighbor Sheryl. Later at night, Martha is unable to sleep due to loud noise coming from Sheryl's house, forcing her to call the community's security chief Carl to stop the noise. But Sheryl and her party sneak into Martha's house to evade Carl, where she convinces a reluctant Martha to allow them to hide there. From that night on, Sheryl becomes interested in being Martha's friend and invites her to various activities, but Martha resists.

Martha watches a television program about fireworks being used for funerals, and makes plans to use fireworks for her own funeral. A few days later, she accepts Sheryl as a friend, and while getting to know each other, Sheryl learns that Martha was a cheerleader, where she had to quit before her first game to care for her ailing mother. Sheryl says that Martha should try to be a cheerleader again. After thinking about it, Martha goes to see Sheryl at a high school where she works as a substitute teacher and convinces Sheryl to help her start up a cheerleading club in Sun Springs.

After convincing Vicki to allow them to start the club and to recruit the minimum requirement of eight members, Martha and Sheryl hold tryouts. Six women join: Olive, Alice, Ruby, Evelyn, Phyllis and Helen. Martha hires Sheryl's teenage grandson Ben to be their DJ. As the group commences practicing, it quickly becomes difficult for them due to their age and physical conditions. When Vicki tells them they have to find a new place to practice, Sheryl reacts by getting them a spot at a pep rally at the high school. In the locker room before the rally, they get teased by a group of younger cheerleaders, particularly Chloe, one of Sheryl's students. During the pep rally, Martha's group performs okay until Helen hurts her ankle. When Helen is taken to the hospital, they discover from Ben that a video of them at the pep rally has gone viral. In addition with Helen's overbearing son Tom threatening the group with a lawsuit due to her injury, Vicki and other members of the community vote unanimously to disband the club.

With the group going back to their routine lives, Martha invites Sheryl to her house for a drink. When Sheryl watches the video of them, she hears a girl's voice and recognizes it as Chloe, leading her and Martha to blame Chloe for posting the video. They go to Chloe's house and berate her, but Chloe, who has become sympathetic for them, starts crying because she didn't know that her friends would post the video. When Chloe apologizes, Martha and Sheryl forgive her and tell her that they're reassembling the cheerleading squad and need Chloe's help. Chloe agrees to become their choreographer and their coach. Back at Sun Springs, Martha inspires her teammates to come back together so they can prove everybody wrong and show that they can be a team if they work together.

With Chloe coaching them, the group improves greatly as they prepare for an upcoming cheerleading competition. Meanwhile, Martha's cancer, which she has kept secret from the group, has progressed. After leaving a group party, she collapses while walking home. In the hospital, she tells Sheryl that she's not going to the competition and is scared about dying. Sheryl urges Martha to continue her cheerleading despite her suffering.

The next day, Martha and the group rescue Helen from Tom by springing her from her bedroom and escapes from a pursuing Vicki and a sympathetic Chief Carl as they make their way to the competition. Many men from the community, including Chief Carl, gladly attend the competition. The group performs successfully and wins the audience and the other cheerleading teams over. The next scene shows a firework going off, indicating that Martha has died and had her funeral.

A year later, the group has added new members to their squad. They get ready to perform in another cheerleading competition, both as a charity benefit for cancer and in memory of Martha. During the end credits, video clips show other people doing the same kind of dancing that Martha and the group have done.

== Cast ==
- Diane Keaton as Martha
- Jacki Weaver as Sheryl
- Rhea Perlman as Alice
- Alisha Boe as Chloe
- Charlie Tahan as Ben
- Celia Weston as Vicki
- Pam Grier as Olive
- Phyllis Somerville as Helen
- Carol Sutton as Ruby
- Ginny MacColl as Evelyn
- Patricia French as Phyllis
- Bruce McGill as Chief Carl
- Dave Maldonado as Tom
- Afemo Omilami as David
- Alexandra Ficken as Paige
- Sharon Blackwood as Gayle
- Karen Beverly as Barbara
- Steve Kruth as "Ace"

== Production ==
In July 2016, it was announced Zara Hayes would direct the film, from a story written by Hayes and Shane Atkinson and a screenplay by Atkinson. Nick Meyer, Rose Ganguzza, Celyn Jones, Kelly McCormick and Andy Evans serve as producers on the film, while Meyer Schaberg and Marc Schaberg will serve as executive producers, under their Sierra/Affinity, Mad as Birds Films and Rose Pictures banners, respectively. In May 2017, Diane Keaton and Jacki Weaver joined the cast of the film. In July 2018, Pam Grier, Rhea Perlman, Celia Weston, Phyllis Somerville, Alisha Boe, Charlie Tahan and Bruce McGill joined the cast of the film.

Principal photography began in July 2018, in Atlanta, Georgia.

== Release ==
In November 2018, STX Entertainment acquired U.S. distribution rights to the film for $8–9 million. It was released in the United States on May 10, 2019.

== Reception ==
=== Box office ===
In the United States and Canada, Poms was released alongside Pokémon Detective Pikachu, Tolkien and The Hustle, was projected to gross $7–10 million from 2,700 theaters in its opening weekend. The film made $1.5 million on its first day, including $225,000 from Thursday night previews. It ended up under-performing, debuting to just $5.4 million and finishing in sixth. In its second weekend the film dropped 61% to $2.1 million, finishing ninth.

=== Critical response ===
On review aggregator Rotten Tomatoes, the film holds an approval rating of 36% based on 87 reviews, with an average rating of 4.9/10. The website's critical consensus reads, "While the cast is something to cheer about, Poms squanders its talented stars on a clichéd comedy that disrespects the demographic it's trying to celebrate." On Metacritic, the film has a weighted average score of 36 out of 100, based on 17 critics, indicating "generally unfavorable reviews". Audiences polled by CinemaScore gave the film an average grade of "B+" on an A+ to F scale, while PostTrak reported women over 25 (who made up 63% of the opening weekend demographic) gave it an 81% positive score.

=== Anjelica Huston controversy ===
Days before the release of Poms, the actress Anjelica Huston referred to the film as a "humiliating.. old-lady cheerleader movie" in an interview, using it as an example of the poor roles offered to older actresses. In response, Weaver said: "I just laughed. And then I said, 'Well, she can go fuck herself.' I was kind of disappointed. I had always been an admirer of Anjelica. And I thought, 'That's a bit mean and petty.' I would say she must be going through menopause, but she must have had that ages ago." Perlman was also pulled from a scheduled appearance on a talk show alongside Huston, who was simultaneously promoting her own film, John Wick: Chapter 3 – Parabellum. Huston later said that she did not regret her remarks. "I hope I didn't hurt anyone's feelings. And if I did, I hope they come back at me. I can't say that I felt I was saying anything wildly out of place."
