= The Count of Monte Cristo (1961 film) =

- French theatrical release poster
- Directed by: Claude Autant-Lara
- Written by: Jean Halain (adaptation et dialogue)
- Based on: Alexandre Dumas (d'apres le roman d') (as Alexandre Dumas Père)
- Produced by: René Modiano; Jean Jacques Vital; Alain Poiré
- Starring: Louis Jourdan; Yvonne Furneaux; Pierre Mondy; Franco Silva
- Cinematography: Jean Isnard; Jacques Natteau
- Edited by: Madeleine Gug
- Music by: René Cloërec
- Production companies: Cineriz; Les Films J.J. Vital; Les Productions Rene Modiano; Royal; Société Nouvelle des Établissements Gaumont; Seven Arts Productions
- Distributed by: Gaumont Distribution
- Release date: 6 December 1961
- Running time: 188 minutes
- Country: France
- Language: French
- Box office: $33.6 million

The Count of Monte Cristo (French: Le comte de Monte Cristo, US: The Story of the Count of Monte Cristo) is a 1961 French adventure film version of Alexandre Dumas' 1844 novel directed by Claude Autant-Lara and starring Louis Jourdan, Yvonne Furneaux, Pierre Mondy and Franco Silva.

== Plot ==
Edmund Dantes is falsely accused by those jealous of his good fortune, and is sentenced to spend the rest of his life in the notorious island prison, Chateau d'if. There, a prisoner tells Edmund of a fantastic treasure hidden away on a tiny island.

== Cast ==
- Louis Jourdan as Edmond Dantès / Comte de Monte Cristo
- Yvonne Furneaux as Mercédès
- Pierre Mondy as Caderousse
- Franco Silva as Mario
- Bernard Dhéran as Le procureur Henri de Villefort
- Roldano Lupi as Morel
- Claudine Coster as Haydée
- Jean Martinelli as Vidocq
- Marie Mergey as Madame Caderousse
- Yves Rénier as Albert de Mortcerf
- Alain Ferral as Benedetto (as Alain Feral)
- Jean-Jacques Delbo as Himself
- José Squinquel as Himself
- Geymond Vital as Himself
- Henri Arius as Himself (as Arius)
- Jacques Dynam as Himself
- André Dalibert as Himself
- Georges Lannes as Le président
- Paul Amiot as Le président de la Chambre des pairs
- Marthe Marty as Himself
- Chantal de Rieux as Himself
- Jean-Claude Michel as Fernand de Mortcerf
- Henri Vilbert as Danyès - le père d'Edmond
- Henri Guisol as L'abbé Faria

== Reception ==
The film was the seventh most popular film at the French box office in 1961. The sixth most popular was a version of The Three Musketeers.

The film was made with some finance from Seven Arts Productions and was released by Warner Bros.

Variety wrote that the producers "have spared little expense in mounting a pictorially rich and dramatically expansive reproduction of the story...But one vital miscalculation strips their effort of sufficient appeal for the bulk of the modern audience. In adhering rigidly to the plodding, stilted and weighty melodramatic style reasonably fashionable in less sophisticated bygone times, the creators of this version have failed to sense, or refused to reckon with, the realistic requirements of modern screen."
