= The Blunderer =

1954 psychological thriller by Patricia Highsmith

- First edition (US)
- Author: Patricia Highsmith
- Language: English
- Genre: Psychological thriller, mystery
- Publisher: Coward-McCann (US, 1954); W. W. Norton & Company (US, 2001)
- Publication date: 1954
- Publication place: United States
- Media type: Print (hardback & paperback)
- Pages: 288 pp
- ISBN: 978-0-393-32244-6
- OCLC: 48053872
- Dewey Decimal: 813/.54 21
- LC Class: PS3558.I366 B58 2001

The Blunderer is a psychological thriller by Patricia Highsmith, first published in 1954 by Coward-McCann. It was the third of her 22 novels, the second published under her own name.

== Synopsis ==
Mild-mannered lawyer Walter Stackhouse is in a deteriorating marriage to his neurotic wife, Clara. He has suffered for years as she alienated all his friends and embarrassed him with her pettiness, overly dramatic gestures and intolerance of other people's needs. With Walter, she is increasingly distant and, without foundation, begins to accuse him of having an affair with the sweet music teacher Ellie Briess. Walter does eventually become infatuated with Ellie and starts a relationship with her. Jealous Clara then attempts suicide by overdose, forcing Walter back into her arms. However, immediately upon recovering from near-death, Clara falls into her usual pattern; Walter finally stands his ground and demands a divorce.

Days later, Clara is found dead, having fallen off a cliff near an Allentown rest stop while taking a bus to see her dying mother, in what was likely suicide. In time, as the official investigation continues, Walter has to admit to a couple of questionable activities–following Clara's bus in his car, while daydreaming about possibly killing her at the first stop and visiting Melchior Kimmel, a bookshop manager who got away with killing his own wife, prior to Clara's death. Both Walter and Kimmel soon encounter the formidable, possibly psychotic Lieutenant Lawrence Corby, a police officer with savage ambition who is convinced they are both guilty. Corby soon begins encroaching on his suspects' lives, releasing details of their behavior to the press in an effort to distance them from their friends and work associates and repeatedly assaulting Kimmel.

Throughout, Walter's blundering damages his relationships, his reputation and soon threatens his life. By the end, Walter loses his job, his partnership with another lawyer he wanted to open his own office with, and his relationship with Ellie. Meanwhile Kimmel, manipulated and repeatedly tortured by Corby, becomes vengefully fixated on Walter and begins to stalk him. When Walter, having sold the house he lived in with Clara and moved to Manhattan, is in Central Park one night, he becomes aware that Kimmel is pursuing him. He tries to evade him and eventually stages an ambush, dropping down from above and beating him to death, only to discover when Kimmel approaches him moments later that he has just killed a total stranger. Kimmel overpowers Walter and gouges him to death with a knife, in much the same way as he did to his wife, whereupon one of the police officers who tailed him there catches up with Kimmel and arrests him.

== Reception ==
In The New York Times, Anthony Boucher recognized the novel's similarity to Strangers on a Train in its "striking plot idea", which is "so complex that it defies brief synopsis". He continued:

The novel starts off admirably both as suspense and as a deeper analysis of character, but passes the point of no return as the author gropes for (and fails to find) a way out of the intricate situation she has set up. Hardly a successful novel, but an ambitious and largely interesting attempt.

== Film adaptations ==
- Enough Rope (1963, French-language title: Le Meurtrier), a French film directed by Claude Autant-Lara
- A Kind of Murder (2016), directed by Andy Goddard and starring Patrick Wilson and Jessica Biel
