= Six Minutes to Midnight =

2020 British war drama film

- Theatrical release poster
- Directed by: Andy Goddard
- Screenplay by: Andy Goddard; Celyn Jones; Eddie Izzard
- Story by: Celyn Jones; Eddie Izzard
- Produced by: Ade Shannon; Andy Evan; Sarah Townsend; Sean Marley
- Starring: Eddie Izzard; Carla Juri; James D'Arcy; Celyn Jones; David Schofield; Jim Broadbent; Judi Dench
- Cinematography: Chris Seager
- Edited by: Mike Jones
- Music by: Marc Streitenfeld
- Production companies: Lionsgate; Mad as Birds; West Madison Entertainment
- Distributed by: Sky Cinema
- Release dates: 15 October 2020 (Russia); 26 March 2021 (United Kingdom)
- Running time: 100 minutes
- Country: United Kingdom
- Language: English
- Box office: $2.4 million

Six Minutes to Midnight is a 2020 British war drama film directed by Andy Goddard from a screenplay - loosely based on a true story - by Goddard, Celyn Jones and Eddie Izzard, starring Izzard, Judi Dench, Carla Juri, James D'Arcy and Jim Broadbent.

Six Minutes to Midnight was released in the United Kingdom on 26 March 2021 by Sky Cinema. The film received mixed reviews from critics.

== Plot ==
Shortly before the outbreak of World War II, the Augusta Victoria College, a finishing school for daughters of the Nazi elite in Bexhill-on-Sea, is under surveillance by the British secret service and English teacher Wheatley, a government agent. Realising his cover has been blown, Wheatley disappears before he can report to his handler, Colonel Smith. Another German-speaking agent, Captain Thomas Miller, is sent to replace him. When the girls go to the beach for a swim, they find Wheatley's body washed into the shallows.

Miller investigates and, during a party, overhears a German diplomat tell PT instructor Ilse Keller, herself a former pupil, of plans to secretly repatriate the pupils to Germany. Miller rushes to inform Smith of the news, but Keller follows him, shoots Smith and frames Miller for it. Now wanted for murder and unable to prove his credentials, Miller attempts to hide from the police.

Despite disguising himself as a bandsman, he is caught and incarcerated in the local police cells, from which he is extracted by government agents Captain Drey and Corporal Willis. Miller reveals his identity as a British agent to Drey, offering a microfilm stashed at the school as evidence of his role. They take the handcuffed Miller back to the school to recover the film, a copy of Keller's list of British spies in Germany. At the school, Drey is revealed to be a Nazi sympathiser, but Miller overpowers him and goes on the run again. Local bus driver Charlie sees him along the road and drives him to his farm, where, believing his story, he uses a hacksaw to remove the cuffs. When Drey and Willis turn up, Miller escapes across the fields, eventually finds a phone box miles away, and has just enough time to pass on the code phrase "Six Minutes to Midnight" to his superiors before Drey and Willis arrive. Realising that Willis is unaware of Drey's pro-Nazi sympathies, Miller starts talking. Drey turns and shoots Willis since his cover has been blown. Miller runs for it, and Drey takes his time casually shooting at Miller before sighting for the kill. Before Drey can fire at Miller again, the dying Willis shoots his superior.

Miller returns to the school, where the headmistress, Miss Rocholl, finds her charges all gone. They have been led, some reluctantly, by Keller to a clifftop where they form two lines to mark out a landing strip as the sun begins to set. A Luftwaffe Junkers Ju 52 arrives and the mädchen light their flares and hold them aloft, but a following RAF Spitfire forces the plane to turn away just as Miller and Rocholl pull up in Willis' car. Keller pulls a gun, intending to shoot rebellious pupil Gretel, but Miller, Rocholl and Gretel persuade her not to; the girls run to Rocholl and Keller surrenders to Miller.

A few days later, two days after Germany invades Poland, Miller says goodbye to Rocholl in her office at the school, telling her the girls will remain in her care until a solution can be found. The girls sing a parting chorus of It's a Long Way to Tipperary as he leaves. From a radio comes Neville Chamberlain's voice announcing that Britain is at war with Germany.

== Cast ==
- Eddie Izzard as Captain Thomas Miller
- Carla Juri as Ilse Keller
- James D'Arcy as Captain Drey
- Celyn Jones as Corporal Willis
- David Schofield as Colonel Smith
- Jim Broadbent as Charlie
- Judi Dench as Miss Rocholl
- Maria Dragus as Astrid
- Tijan Marei as Gretel
- Franziska Brandmeier as Beatrix
- Luisa-Céline Gaffron as Sigrid
- Bianca Nawrath as Paula
- Daria Wolf as Leta
- Kevin Eldon as Police Sergeant Simmons
- Nigel Lindsay as Wheatley

== Production ==
Eddie Izzard first wrote the script with Celyn Jones, having acted together in the BBC wartime drama Castles In The Sky. The story takes place in Bexhill-on-Sea, where Izzard grew up. Izzard's former girlfriend, Sarah Townsend, was originally set to direct the film following previous collaborations on documentaries with Izzard. Andy Goddard, who is known for his work on Downton Abbey was later announced as director. The same day, Judi Dench was cast as the headmistress. Lionsgate distributed the film domestically.

Principal photography began on 3 July 2018, and ran for six weeks, shooting in Wales and various locations around the UK.

== Release ==
The film was released in the United Kingdom on 26 March 2021 by Sky Cinema. It was previously scheduled to be released on 29 May 2020, by Lionsgate, but was delayed by the COVID-19 pandemic. IFC Films distributed the film in the United States, where it was also released on 26 March 2021.

Six Minutes to Midnight was released on digital platforms on March 26, 2021, followed by a release on DVD and Blu-ray on October 5, 2021.

== Reception ==
On Rotten Tomatoes, the film has an approval rating of 35% based on 66 reviews, with an average rating of 5.5/10. The website's critics' consensus reads: "Six Minutes to Midnight has a fascinating fact-based WWII-era story to tell, but largely loses it in muddled spy shenanigans." On Metacritic, it has a weighted average score of 50 out of 100 based on reviews from 14 critics, indicating "mixed or average reviews".

In a review for RogerEbert.com, critic Nell Minow writes: "The issues of individual, cultural, and national loyalty—and when and how to respond to aggressive actions by other nations—are relegated to the background of some weak chase scenes and plot twists."
