= The Vanishing (2018 film) =

2018 British psychological thriller film

- Theatrical release poster
- Directed by: Kristoffer Nyholm
- Written by: Celyn Jones; Joe Bone
- Produced by: Gerard Butler; Maurice Fadida; Andy Evans; Sean Marley; Ade Shannon; Alan Siegel
- Starring: Gerard Butler; Peter Mullan; Connor Swindells
- Cinematography: Jørgen Johansson
- Edited by: Morten Højbjerg
- Music by: Benjamin Wallfisch
- Production companies: Mad as Birds; Kodiak Pictures; Cross Creek Pictures; G-BASE; iWood Studios
- Distributed by: Lionsgate
- Release dates: 11 October 2018 (Sitges Film Festival); March 2019 (United Kingdom)
- Running time: 107 minutes
- Country: United Kingdom
- Language: English
- Budget: $5 million
- Box office: $1.2 million

The Vanishing, previously titled Keepers, is a 2018 British psychological thriller film directed by Kristoffer Nyholm and written by Celyn Jones and Joe Bone. Based on the 1900 disappearance of the Flannan Isles Lighthouse crew, it stars Gerard Butler, Peter Mullan, and Connor Swindells as three lighthouse keepers whose shift takes a dark turn.

The Vanishing premiered at the Sitges Film Festival in October 2018, which was followed by a United Kingdom release in March 2019.

== Plot ==
Three men begin their six-week shift tending to the remote Flannan Isles Lighthouse. Donald, the youngest, is inexperienced and learning the trade of the lighthouse keeper from James and Thomas. James has a family waiting for him on the mainland. Thomas is still mourning the loss of his wife and children.

After a storm, the men discover a boat, a body and a wooden chest washed ashore. Donald descends the cliffs to check on the man, who appears lifeless. As they haul up the chest, the man awakens and attacks Donald. Donald smashes the man's head with a rock in self-defence.

Thomas is against opening the chest, but does so alone and keeps the findings to himself. Eventually the other two give in to their curiosity and discover several gold bars inside. Urging caution and secrecy, Thomas proposes they dispose of the body, sneak the gold back to the mainland, and lie low for a year before splitting their shares.

Another boat arrives with strangers Locke and Boor, crewmates of the deceased. They interrogate Thomas who claims the cargo has been reported and taken away, as per protocol. The visitors leave but attempt to contact the lighthouse by radio. Thomas and James are unable to respond due to their malfunctioning radio, revealing their lie. The strangers return, circling the island until nightfall. In a violent struggle James manages to strangle Boor and Donald kills Locke, using the woolding. Sensing another intruder outside, the keepers chase him through the darkness and James slashes him with a hook. He is horrified to discover he has killed a young boy, reminding him of his son.

After dumping the bodies into the sea, the three men endure their remaining time on the island despite mounting distrust and tension. James in particular becomes unhinged, secluding himself in the tiny chapel nearby. Donald grows uneasy and insists that he and Thomas leave with the gold. James suddenly reappears, apologising for his behaviour. Once Donald and Thomas let their guards down, James locks Thomas in the pantry and strangles Donald. Thomas breaks free and subdues James.

Finally ready to depart the island, Thomas and James board the dead visitors' boat with the gold. After throwing Donald's body overboard, James admits that he cannot bear to live with his guilt and lowers himself into the water to end his life. He calls for Thomas to help with this last act and Thomas complies by holding James' head under water before sailing on alone.

== Cast ==
- Gerard Butler as James Ducat
- Peter Mullan as Thomas Marshall
- Connor Swindells as Donald McArthur
- Ólafur Darri Ólafsson as Boor
- Søren Malling as Locke
- Gary Lewis as Kenny
- Gary Kane as Gherd
- Roderick Gilkison as the galley hand
- Emma King as Mary

== Production ==
On 31 October 2016 it was announced that a psychological thriller Keepers was in development, which Kristoffer Nyholm would make his directing debut from a script by Celyn Jones and Joe Bone. Kodiak Pictures would fully finance the film along with Cross Creek Pictures, which would be produced by Andy Evans, Ade Shannon, and Sean Marley for Mad as Birds along with Gerard Butler and Alan Siegel for G-BASE, Maurice Fadida for Kodiak Pictures, and Brian Oliver for Cross Creek. Butler, Peter Mullan and Connor Swindells would star as James, Thomas, and Donald, respectively, in the film inspired by a true unresolved 1900 mystery at the Flannan Isles Lighthouse.

Principal photography on the film began in mid-April 2017 in Galloway, Scotland. Locations included the Mull of Galloway, Port Logan harbour, Killantringan Lighthouse near Portpatrick and Corsewall Lighthouse near Stranraer.

== Reception ==
On review aggregator Rotten Tomatoes, the film holds an approval rating of 85% based on 39 reviews, with an average rating of 6.4/10. The website's critics consensus reads: "Suspenseful atmosphere, an evocative setting, and a strong cast keep audiences invested throughout The Vanishing's patient approach to unraveling its mystery." On Metacritic, the film has a weighted average score of 64 out of 100, based on 10 critics, indicating "generally favorable reviews".
