= Rod Colbin =

American actor

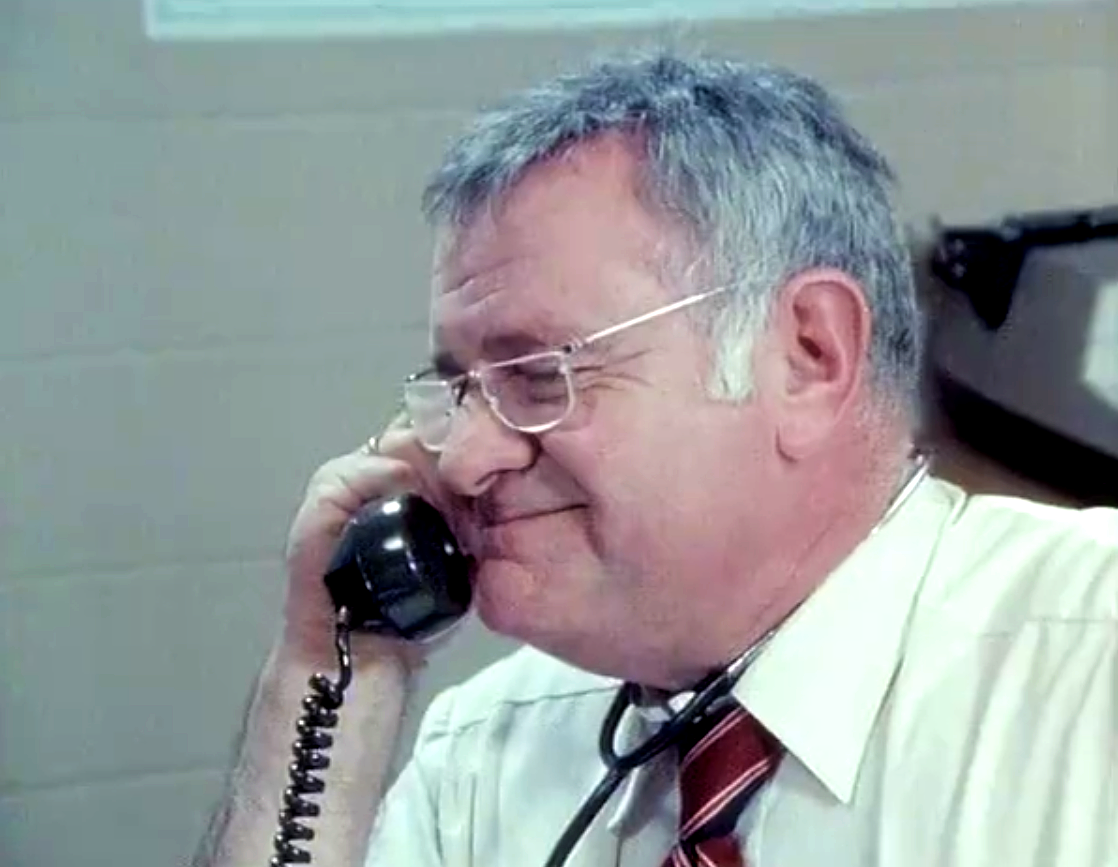
- Colbin in The Optimist, 1983
- Born: Irving Herbert Lichtenstein; November 23, 1923; New Haven, Connecticut, U.S.
- Died: February 4, 2007 (aged 83); Denver, Colorado, U.S.
- Occupations: Actor, Fencing Instructor/Fight Director
- Years active: 1952–1986
- Children: 2

Rod Colbin (born Irving Herbert Lichtenstein: December 23, 1923 – February 4, 2007) was an American character actor whose career spanned four decades. He was also a fencing instructor who, at one time, served as Katharine Hepburn's personal masseur, and is said to have instructed James Dean and Marlon Brando.

== Marriages and family ==
Colbin married Annemarie Polonyi on September 16, 1965; they divorced in 1978. He is the father of Kaila Colbin and two other daughters, one of whom died in a fire aged 4.

== Death ==
Colbin died in February 2007 in Denver, Colorado, after a series of strokes.

== Filmography ==
- 1954 – Man Against Crime (TV series) ... as Baxter
- 1955 – Mr. Citizen (TV series)
- 1966 – The Edge of Night... as Doorman
- 1975 – Sanford and Son (TV series) ... as Coach Bradley in original "Grady" TV series pilot
- 1975 – Maude ... as Boozer
- 1975–1976 – Marcus Welby, M.D. (2 episodes) ... as Dr. Tom Leonard
- 1976 – Insight (TV series)
- 1976 – Harry O ... as Administrator
- 1976 – The Gumball Rally
- 1976 – Mary Hartman, Mary Hartman (4 episodes) ... as Commissioner Rittenhouse
- 1977 – Alice (1 episode) as Edger Patton in the episode "The Bus"
- 1977 – John Hus ... as John Hus
- 1977 – The Jeffersons (TV series) (1 episode) as Mr. Billings in episode "The Grand Opening: Part 2"
- 1977 – Lou Grant (TV series) as Warren Woods in episode "The Scoop"
- 1977 – Charlie's Angels (TV series) as Dr. Eggars in episode titled "Little Angels of the Night"
- 1977 – 1982 Barney Miller (TV series)...Various roles (7 episodes)
- 1978 – To Kill a Cop (TV Movie) ... as Chief Emerson
- 1979 – Anatomy of a Seduction (TV movie)
- 1979 – 1980 The Ropers (TV series) ... Hubert Armbrewster (4 episodes)
- 1979 – 1980 Quincy, M.E. (TV series) Dr.Lang/George Myers (4 episodes)
- 1980 – Rape and Marriage: The Rideout Case (TV movie)
- 1980 – A Change of Seasons ... Sam Bingham
- 1981 – Harper Valley PTA (TV series)...Chief Palmer (2 episodes)
- 1981 – Sanford (TV series)...Judge
- 1980 – 1981 Flo (TV series)...2 episodes
- 1981 – 1982 Three's Company (TV series)...as Mr. Frankin/Mr. Hadley in 2 episodes
- 1981 – 1982 The Greatest American Hero (TV series) as General Enright / Theodore Svenson (2 episodes)
- 1982 – Yes, Giorgio ...Ted Mullane
- 1982 – Frances ...Sentencing Judge
- 1983 – Ghost Dancing ...Arch
- 1983 – Remington Steele ...Carlos Mondragon (1 episode)
- 1983 – The Optimist ...Doctor (1 episode)
- 1983 – Hardcastle and McCormick (TV series)
- 1984 – The A-Team ...Jes Hicks
- 1984 – Frankenstein's Great Aunt Tillie ...Grocer Schnitt
- 1984 – Gimme a Break! ...Dr. Kessler
- 1984 – Little House: The Last Farewell ...Mr. Davis
- 1985 – Torchlight ...Dr. Urban
- 1986 – The Twilight Zone (TV series) ...Minister (segment "Red Snow")
