= Enough Rope (film) =

- French film poster
- Directed by: Claude Autant-Lara
- Screenplay by: Jean Aurenche; Pierre Bost
- Based on: The Blunderer by Patricia Highsmith
- Produced by: Alexander Grüter
- Starring: Marina Vlady; Robert Hossein; Maurice Ronet; Yvonne Furneaux; Gert Fröbe
- Cinematography: Jacques Natteau
- Edited by: Madeleine Gug
- Music by: René Cloërec
- Color process: Black and white
- Production companies: Coron Filmproduktion; Galatea Film; International Productions; Les Films Marceau; Sancro Film
- Distributed by: Cocinor
- Release date: 11 January 1963
- Running time: 116 minutes
- Countries: France; Italy; West Germany
- Language: French

Enough Rope (French: Le meurtrier) is a 1963 French-Italian-West-German neo noir crime film directed by Claude Autant-Lara and starring Marina Vlady, Robert Hossein, Maurice Ronet, Yvonne Furneaux and Gert Fröbe. The film is an adaptation of Patricia Highsmith's 1954 novel The Blunderer.

== Plot ==
Walter Saccard and Melchior Kimmel are both suspected for the murder of their wives and set out to prove their innocence.

== Cast ==
- Marina Vlady as Ellie
- Robert Hossein as Corby
- Maurice Ronet as Walter Saccard
- Yvonne Furneaux as Clara Saccard
- Gert Fröbe as Melchior Kimmel
- Paulette Dubost as Helen Kimmel
- Jacques Monod as Le commissaire / Police Commissioner
- Harry Meyen as Tony
- Clara Gansard as La bonne
- Laurence Badie as La serveuse

== Release ==
The film was released in France on 11 January 1963 through Tamasa Distribution. It had 946,050 admissions in France.

== See also ==
- List of French films of 1963
