= Andy Goddard =

British director and screenwriter (born 1968)

- Born: 1968 (age 57–58); Pembroke Dock, Wales
- Occupations: Director; screenwriter; producer
- Years active: 1997–present

Andy Goddard (born 1968) is a Welsh director and screenwriter, best known for writing and directing his feature debut Set Fire to the Stars (2014) and directing and co-producing his second feature A Kind of Murder (2016). Goddard has also directed five episodes of the ITV period drama series Downton Abbey.

== Life and career ==
Goddard was born in Pembroke Dock, Wales and grew up on the Isle of Skye in Scotland. He later studied film, photography and television at Napier University in Edinburgh.

Goddard's debut short Little Sisters was nominated for a BAFTA Award and won the Gold Hugo Award for Best Narrative Short Film at the 34th Chicago International Film Festival. The film went on to win the DM Davies Award at the Welsh International Film Festival and the Grand Prix in European Competition at Festival du film de Vendôme.

His television work includes episodes of The Bill, Once Upon a Time, Torchwood, Law & Order: UK, Downton Abbey, and Doctor Who. In 2014, Goddard collaborated with actor Celyn Jones on Set Fire to the Stars, a feature-length film depicting Dylan Thomas' first trip to America in 1950. Jones portrayed the Welsh poet, opposite Elijah Wood, from a screenplay he co-wrote with Goddard. The film premiered at the 68th Edinburgh International Film Festival, and Goddard and Jones were nominated for the BAFTA Cymru Award for Best Screenwriting. He has directed the psychological thriller film A Kind of Murder, starring Patrick Wilson and Jessica Biel, an adaptation of the Patricia Highsmith novel The Blunderer.

== Filmography ==
Year	Title	Credited as		Format	Notes
Year	Title	Director	Writer	Format	Notes
1998	Little Sisters	Yes	Yes	Short film	
1999	Yabba Yabba Ding Ding	Yes	Yes	Short film	
2000	Rice Paper Stars	Yes	Yes	TV short	
2000	Kings of the Wild Frontier	Yes	Yes	TV short	
2001	Stacey Stone	Yes	No	TV series	7 episodes
2003	Taggart	Yes	No	TV series	2 episodes
2003	Casualty	Yes	No	TV series	Episode: "Hurt the One You Love"
2003	The Bill	Yes	No	TV series	2 episodes
2005	Hex	Yes	No	TV series	Episode: "Noir"
2005	Twisted Tales	Yes	No	TV series	4 episodes
2005	Murphy's Law	Yes	No	TV series	2 episodes
2006	Wire in the Blood	Yes	No	TV series	Episode: "Time to Murder and Create"
2006	The Outsiders	Yes	No	TV film	
2006–08	Torchwood	Yes	No	TV series	6 episodes
2008	Doctor Who	Yes	No	TV series	Episode: "The Next Doctor"
2009–11	Law & Order: UK	Yes	No	TV series	10 episodes
2011–12	Downton Abbey	Yes	No	TV series	5 episodes
2011	Outcasts	Yes	No	TV series	2 episodes
2013	Dracula	Yes	No	TV series	2 episodes
2013	Once Upon a Time	Yes	No	TV series	Episode: "Save Henry"
2014	Set Fire to the Stars	Yes	Yes	Film	
2016	A Kind of Murder	Yes	No	Film	Also co-producer
2016	Daredevil	Yes	No	TV series	Episode: "Regrets Only"
2016	The Level	Yes	No	TV series	3 episodes
2016, 2018	Luke Cage	Yes	No	TV series	2 episodes
2017	Iron Fist	Yes	No	TV series	Episode: "Bar the Big Boss"
2017	The Punisher	Yes	No	TV series	2 episodes
2018	Altered Carbon	Yes	No	TV series	1 episode
2019	Six Minutes to Midnight	Yes	No	Film	
2019	Carnival Row	Yes	No	TV series	2 episodes
2023–24	Monarch: Legacy of Monsters	Yes	No	TV series	2 episodes; also executive producer

== Awards and nominations ==
Year	Award	Category	Work	Result
1998	BAFTA Award	Best Short Film (with Nic Muirson)	Little Sisters	Nominated
1998	Chicago International Film Festival	Gold Hugo for Best Narrative Short Film	Little Sisters	Won
2000	Chicago International Film Festival	Gold Hugo for Best Narrative Short Film	Rice Paper Stars	Nominated
2010	Hugo Awards	Best Dramatic Presentation – Short Form (with Russell T. Davies)	Doctor Who (for the episode "The Next Doctor")	Nominated
2010	SFX Awards	Best TV Episode (with Russell T. Davies)	Doctor Who (for the episode "The Next Doctor")	Nominated
2014	Edinburgh International Film Festival	Best British Feature Film	Set Fire to the Stars	Nominated
2014	Edinburgh International Film Festival	Audience Award	Set Fire to the Stars	Nominated
2015	BAFTA Cymru	Best Screenwriting (with Celyn Jones)	Set Fire to the Stars	Nominated
2015	Miami International Film Festival	Best Screenplay (with Celyn Jones)	Set Fire to the Stars	Nominated
