= Jessica Biel =

American actress (born 1982)

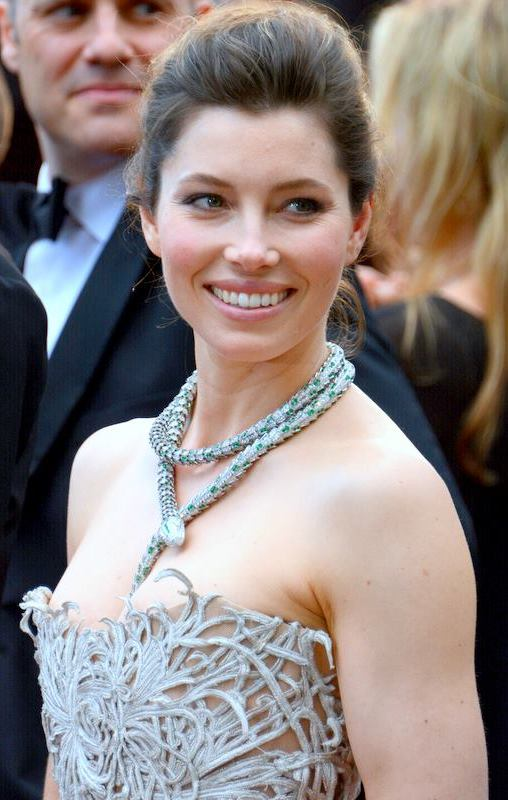
- Biel at the 2013 Cannes Film Festival
- Born: Jessica Claire Biel; March 3, 1982 (age 44); Ely, Minnesota, U.S.
- Occupations: Actress; producer
- Years active: 1991–present
- Spouse: Justin Timberlake (m. 2012)
- Children: 2

Jessica Claire Timberlake (née Biel /biːl/; born March 3, 1982) is an American actress. Biel began her career as a vocalist appearing in musical productions until she was cast as Mary Camden in the family drama series 7th Heaven (1996–2007).

In 1997, Biel won the Young Artist Award for her role in the drama film Ulee's Gold. She received further recognition for her lead role as Erin Hardesty in the horror film remake The Texas Chainsaw Massacre (2003). Biel has since starred in The Rules of Attraction (2002), Blade: Trinity (2004), Stealth (2005), The Illusionist (2006), I Now Pronounce You Chuck & Larry (2007), Valentine's Day (2010), The A-Team (2010), New Year's Eve (2011), Total Recall (2012), and Hitchcock (2012).

In 2017, Biel was the executive producer and star of the USA Network limited drama series The Sinner. This earned her nominations for a Golden Globe Award and a Primetime Emmy Award for Outstanding Lead Actress in a Limited Series or Movie.

== Early life and education ==
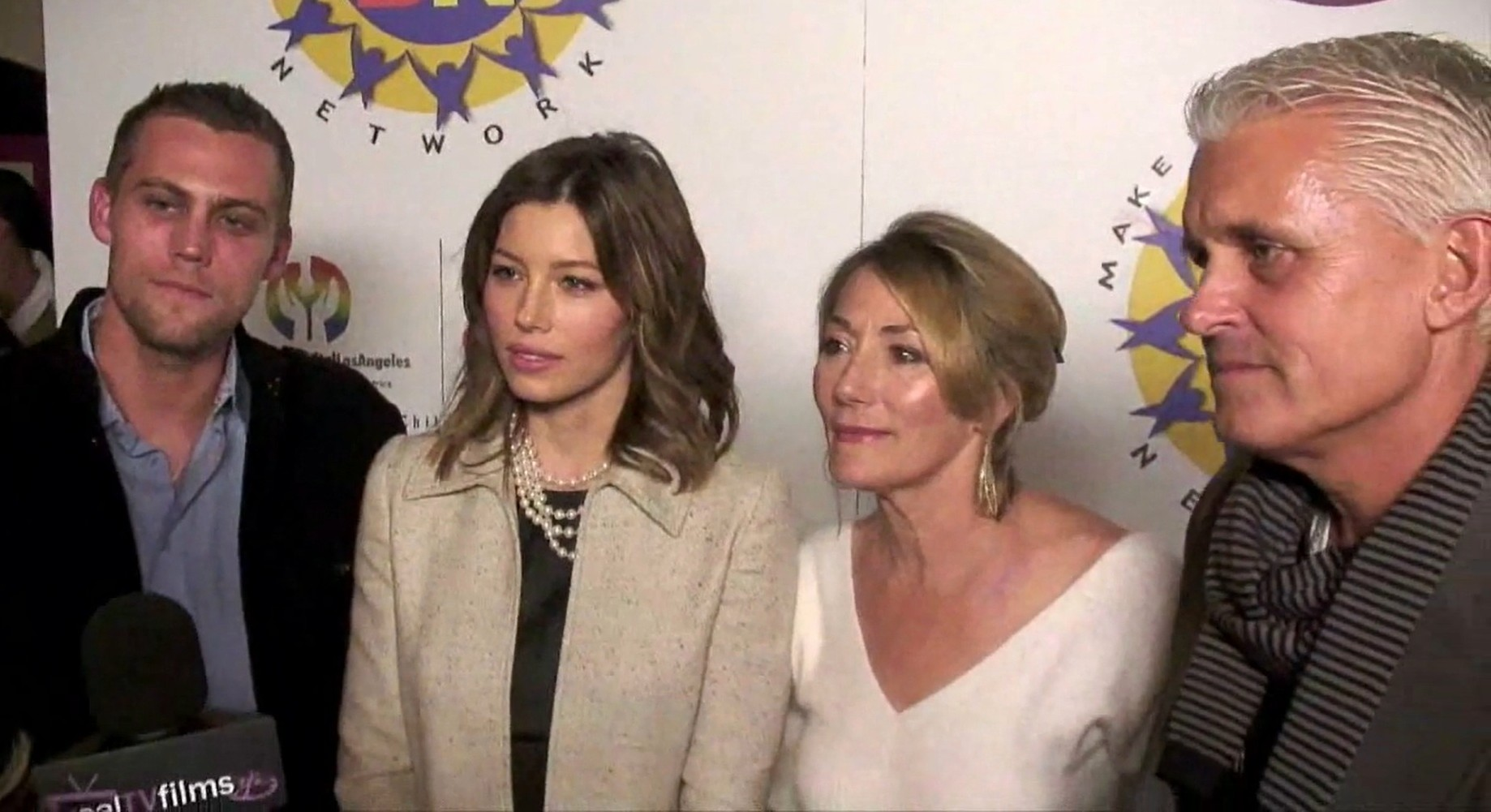
Biel family in 2008; left to right: Justin, Jessica, Kimberly, and Jonathan Biel

Jessica Claire Biel was born on March 3, 1982, in Ely, Minnesota, to Kimberly (née Conroe), a homemaker and spiritual healer, and Jonathan Biel, a business consultant and General Electric worker. Her paternal great-grandfather was the son of Hungarian Jewish immigrants, which she discovered on the show Who Do You Think You Are?; she also has German, French, English, and Scandinavian ancestry.

Biel's family moved frequently during her childhood, living in Texas, Connecticut, and Woodstock, Illinois, before finally settling in Boulder, Colorado. While growing up, Biel played soccer and trained as a level six gymnast.

From 2000 to 2002, she attended Tufts University in Medford, Massachusetts.

== Career ==
=== Beginnings (1991–2002) ===
Biel initially trained to be a vocalist. At age nine, she appeared in several musical productions in her hometown, playing lead roles in productions such as The Sound of Music and Beauty and the Beast. At 11 she participated in a competition sponsored by the International Modeling and Talent Association in Los Angeles where she acquired an agent and professional talent manager. She began modeling for print advertisements and appeared in commercials for products such as Dulux Paint and Pringles. In her film debut, Biel played the character Regrettal, a lead role in the ambitious musical film It's a Digital World, produced and directed by Paul Greenberg. At age 14, after auditioning for several television pilots, Biel was cast as Mary Camden, the oldest daughter and second-oldest child in the family drama 7th Heaven.

Biel landed her first feature film role as Peter Fonda's granddaughter in the critically acclaimed drama Ulee's Gold, released in 1997. Her performance earned her a Young Artist Award. In spring 1998, during a break from filming 7th Heaven, she co-starred in I'll Be Home for Christmas with Jonathan Taylor Thomas as his character's love interest. When she was 17, she posed for a risque photo shoot that appeared in the March 2000 issue of Gear. Producers of 7th Heaven were outraged and brought legal action against Gear. She later expressed regret for doing it, claiming she had been used and that she had been shown different pictures from those published. In 2001, Biel played the love interest of Freddie Prinze Jr. in the baseball-themed film Summer Catch. In 2002, she starred as promiscuous college student Lara in the ensemble film The Rules of Attraction, an adaptation of the Bret Easton Ellis novel. The movie received mixed reviews, became a box-office hit, and has since gained a cult following.

=== Rise to prominence (2003–2012) ===
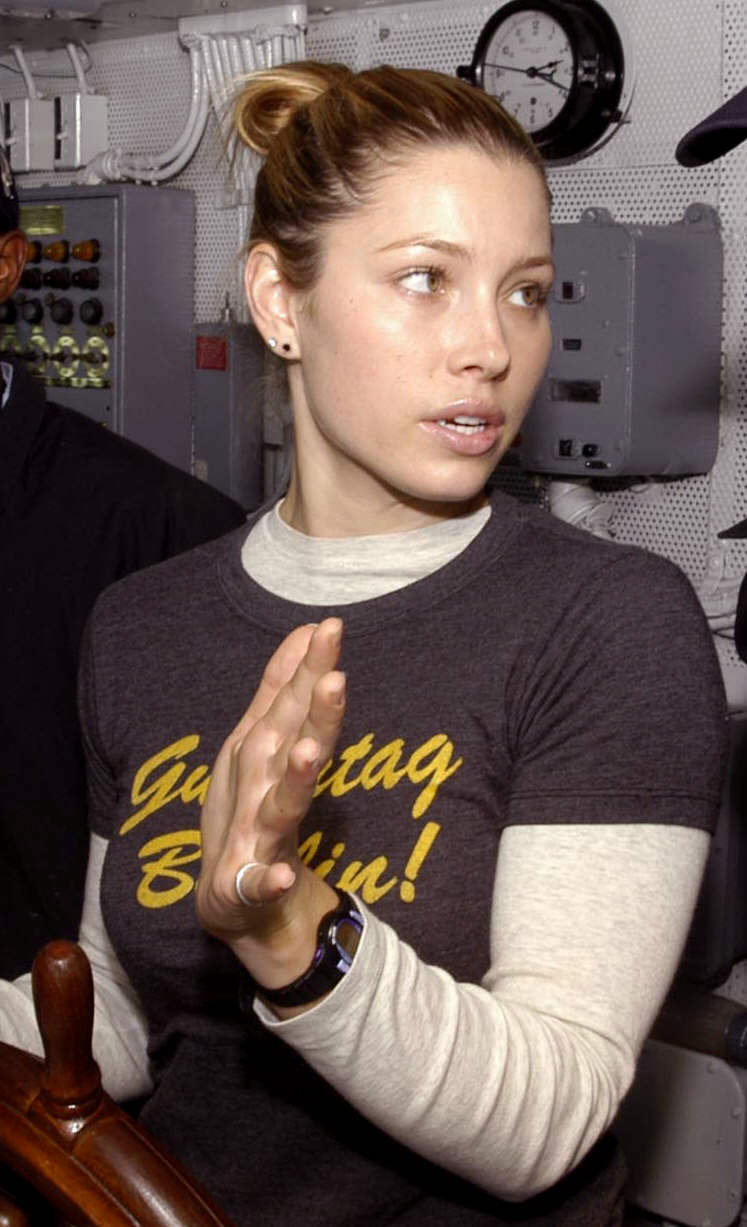
Biel on board the USS Abraham Lincoln in June 2004

Biel was cast in her first top-billing role in The Texas Chainsaw Massacre remake. Although the film met with negative reviews, it was a commercial success, scoring the number-one spot in its opening week and going on to earn more than $80 million in the U.S. In 2003, Biel began work on the third installment of the Blade film series, Blade: Trinity. Despite negative reviews, Trinity was a box office hit, grossing $150 million worldwide. After finishing it in 2004, she headed to Australia to shoot the action-thriller Stealth. Biel also appeared in the 2004 film Cellular; played a supporting role, Ellen, in the romantic comedy Elizabethtown (2005); and starred in the indie film London. In 2005, Esquire named her the "Sexiest Woman Alive" in a six-part series with each month revealing a different body part and clue to the woman's identity.

In 2006, Biel played a turn-of-the-century duchess in the period piece The Illusionist, co-starring Edward Norton and Paul Giamatti. While her casting was met with a mixed response, her performance was ultimately praised. James Berardinelli of Reelviews called her the "film's real acting revelation", while Todd McCarthy of Variety wrote, "Handily employing a refined English accent where the others lay on a light Austrian veneer, Biel is entirely stunning enough to fight to the death over." Biel played an Iraq War veteran in the 2006 film Home of the Brave, a drama about soldiers struggling to readjust to society after facing the hardships of war. In Next Biel starred alongside Nicolas Cage and Julianne Moore. She appeared in the summer comedy I Now Pronounce You Chuck & Larry, co-starring Adam Sandler and Kevin James. In late 2007, Biel signed on to play a stripper in Powder Blue, alongside Forest Whitaker (who also produced the film), Ray Liotta and Patrick Swayze. In 2007, Stuff magazine's named her No. 1 on their "100 Sexiest Women".

At the start of 2008, Biel shot Easy Virtue, an adaptation of the play by Noël Coward. Like the play, the film is set in the 1920s and Biel plays young widow Larita, who impulsively marries John Whittaker in France and must face her disapproving in-laws on returning to England. The film premiered in September 2008 at the Toronto International Film Festival. Critics praised Biel for her performance, with Todd McCarthy of Variety saying Biel "more than kept up" with veterans Kristin Scott Thomas and Colin Firth and praising her "sparkling" performance. The Hollywood Reporter described her performance as "an irresistible force of nature — a kind, witty, supremely intelligent and beautiful woman who ... is capable of rejoinders that thoroughly undercut her opponent's withering criticism." Biel also performed two songs on the film's soundtrack, "Mad About the Boy" and "When the Going Gets Tough".

In 2009, Biel lent her voice to the animated science fiction film Planet 51. Biel performed the role of Sarah Brown with the Los Angeles Philharmonic in a fully staged concert production of Guys and Dolls during the 2009 season at the Hollywood Bowl. On the last night, she received a rousing standing ovation from 17,000 people. She subsequently landed a part in Lincoln Center Theater's two-week-long workshop of the musical version of the Pedro Almodóvar film Women on the Verge of a Nervous Breakdown, along with Salma Hayek.

In 2010, Biel starred in the large ensemble cast film Valentine's Day and in the A-Team, based on the television series as Capt. Charissa Sosa. In 2011, she appeared in New Year's Eve, directed by Valentine's Day's Garry Marshall. In 2012, Biel starred in the remake of the 1990 science fiction movie Total Recall alongside Colin Farrell and Kate Beckinsale. She portrayed actress Vera Miles in the biographical film Hitchcock, based on Stephen Rebello's book Alfred Hitchcock and the Making of Psycho. She also appeared in Playing for Keeps with Gerard Butler.

=== Independent film route and move into producing (2013–present) ===
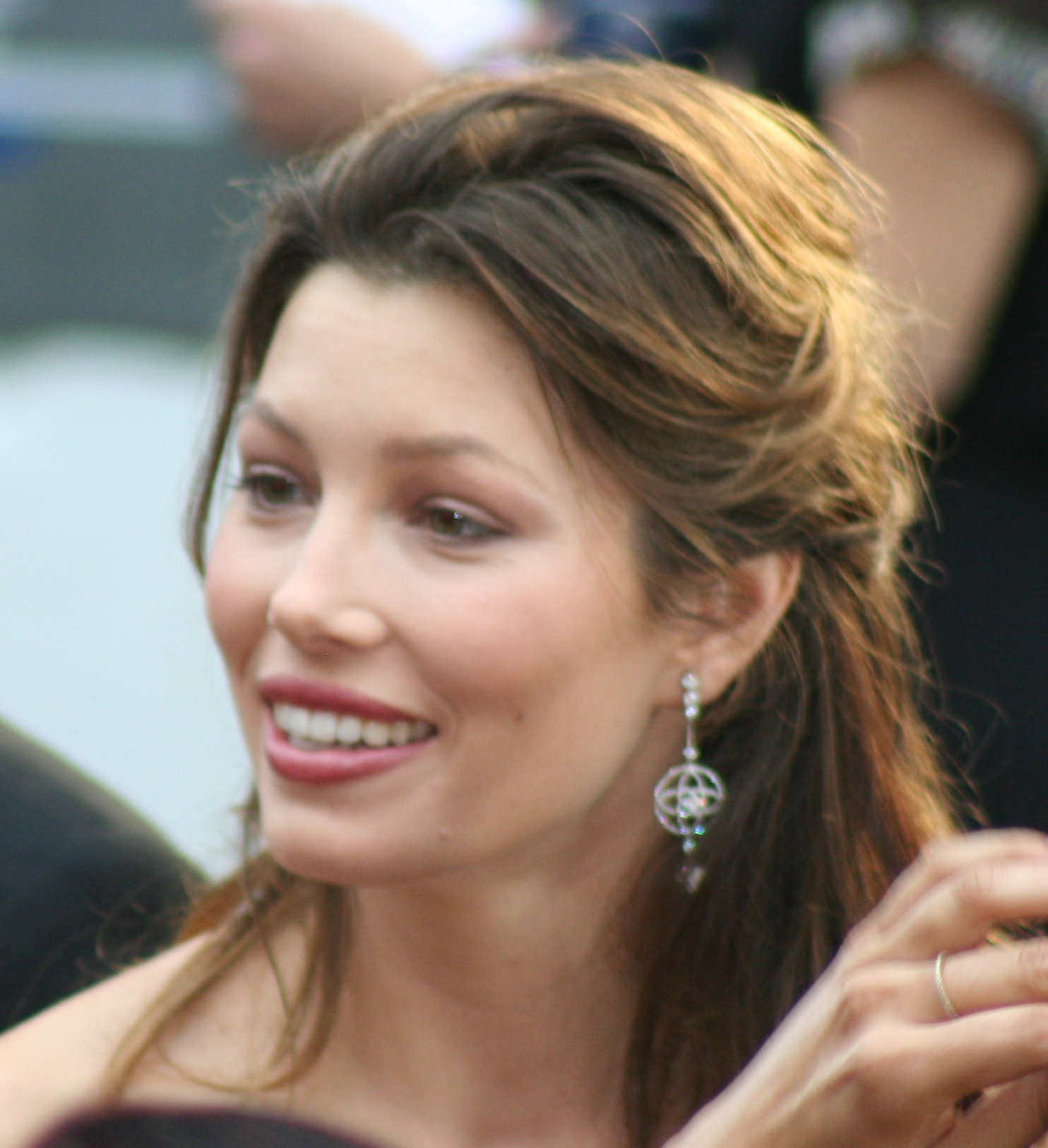
Biel at the 81st Academy Awards in 2009

Biel starred in the thriller film Emanuel and the Truth About Fishes, which premiered at the Sundance Film Festival on January 18, 2013. In April 2008, Biel began working on the political satire Accidental Love, with Jake Gyllenhaal. The film centers around a woman who accidentally gets a nail lodged in her head and travels to Washington, D.C. to fight for better health care. In May 2009, Biel spoke about the film's production turmoil, saying: "That was definitely an experience, something I could not say no to. I am a huge David O. Russell fan. It's just heartbreaking that so many people put so much work into this particular project only to have it sit there, unfinished." The film was released on video on demand on February 10, 2015, and received largely negative reviews from critics.

In 2015, Biel starred in the independent drama Bleeding Heart, in which she plays a yoga instructor named May who meets her biological sister Shiva (Zosia Mamet), a sex worker, for the first time. The film premiered on April 17, 2015, at the Tribeca Film Festival, receiving mixed reviews, though Biel earned praise for her performance. Richard Lawson of Vanity Fair commented: "Though she's not given too much to work with in terms of character, Biel plays May with appealing nuance, creating a low-key, bliss-based Angeleno, all light and airy and gentle and poised, who discovers within herself an untapped hardness and anger and strength... when Biel has to conjure up more profound emotions, she proves adept, and surprisingly subtle." Clayton Davis of AwardsCircuit.com also praised her performance, writing, "With an internalized and very subtle performance, Biel excels in her ability to find the very motivation of May."

In 2016, Biel co-starred with Patrick Wilson (with whom she had worked on The A-Team) in the thriller A Kind of Murder, based on the novel The Blunderer by Patricia Highsmith. She voiced the character Vix in the animated film Spark, with Susan Sarandon and Hilary Swank, which was released in 2016. Biel also appeared in the drama The Book of Love, based on the book The Devil and the Deep Blue Sea, about an introverted architect (Jason Sudeikis) who loses his wife (Biel) and sets out to help a teenager named Millie (Maisie Williams). Biel also produced the project from its conception some years prior, and was directed by Bill Purple, who directed her in the short film Hole in the Paper Sky. The film was released in January 2017.

On August 2, 2017, Biel's eight-episode limited series murder mystery, The Sinner, debuted on USA Network. Biel is both executive producer and played the series' lead character Cora Tannetti. She stated that she moved into production so that she could develop projects with challenging and interesting roles rather than waiting for them to happen.

Biel starred in and executive produced the 2022 true-crime drama miniseries Candy on Hulu.

Biel is set to lead the upcoming sci-fi thriller Ursa Major directed by brothers Jonathan and Josh Baker.

In May 2025, Biel was announced as one of the executive producers on the 7th Heaven reboot in development at CBS Studios, under the banner of her production company Iron Ocean.

== Personal life ==
In January 2007, Biel began dating singer Justin Timberlake. They became engaged in December 2011 and married on October 19, 2012, at the Borgo Egnazia resort in Fasano, Italy. Their first child, a son, was born in April 2015. In July 2020, they had a second son. The children were cared for by Connie Simpson.

Alongside Robert F. Kennedy Jr., Biel publicly lobbied in June 2019 against California's vaccination bill that would limit medical exemptions from vaccinations without approval from a state public health officer. She later clarified she supports vaccinations and had been motivated by how the bill might affect her friends' child with a medical condition requiring an exemption.

=== Charitable causes and commercial enterprises ===
On July 18, 2006, Biel participated in a charity auction to raise medical funds for teen Molly Bloom, who was injured in a limousine accident. "I promise I'm a cheap date", Biel quipped in a pre-recorded video. John Schiffner of Fergus Falls, Minnesota, successfully bid $30,000 to have lunch with Biel. Biel and Schiffner lunched at The Palm restaurant in Denver, Colorado, on August 18, 2006.

In early 2007, Biel co-founded the Make the Difference Network with her father and another business partner, Kent McBride.

In 2010, Biel climbed to the summit of Mount Kilimanjaro with members of the United Nations Foundation to raise awareness of the global water crisis. That same year Biel earned a nomination for a Do Something Award.

Biel teamed with nonprofit health care organization WomanCare Global to develop content that will provide girls with sex education.

In 2021, Biel teamed up with Jeremy Adams, a natural products entrepreneur, and co-founder Greg Willsey, to launch Kinderfarms, a health and wellness brand for families.

== Filmography ==
=== Film ===
Year	Title	Role	Notes
1994	It's a Digital World	Regrettal	Short film; debut
1997	Ulee's Gold	Casey Jackson	
1998	I'll Be Home for Christmas	Allie Henderson	
2001	Summer Catch	Tenley Parrish	
2002	The Rules of Attraction	Lara Holleran	
2003	The Texas Chainsaw Massacre	Erin Hardesty	
2004	Cellular	Chloe	
2004	Blade: Trinity	Abigail Whistler	
2005	Stealth	Lt. Kara Wade	
2005	London	London	
2005	Elizabethtown	Ellen Kishmore	
2006	The Illusionist	Duchess Sophie von Teschen	
2006	Home of the Brave	Vanessa Price	
2007	Next	Liz Cooper	
2007	I Now Pronounce You Chuck & Larry	Alex McDonough	
2008	Hole in the Paper Sky	Karen Watkins	Short film; also executive producer
2008	Easy Virtue	Larita Whittaker	
2009	Powder Blue	Rose-Johnny	
2009	Planet 51	Neera	Voice
2010	Valentine's Day	Kara Monahan	
2010	The A-Team	Capt. Charisa Sosa	
2011	New Year's Eve	Tess Byrne	
2012	The Tall Man	Julia Denning	
2012	Total Recall	Melina	
2012	Hitchcock	Vera Miles	
2012	Playing for Keeps	Stacie Dryer	
2013	The Truth About Emanuel	Linda	
2015	Accidental Love	Alice Eckle	
2015	Bleeding Heart	May	
2016	The Book of Love	Penny Herschel	Also producer
2016	A Kind of Murder	Clara Stackhouse	
2016	Spark	Vix	Voice
2017	Shock and Awe	Lisa	
2026	Matchbox: The Movie	Aimee	
TBA	Ursa Major †	Charlie	Post-production

=== Television ===
Year	Title	Role	Notes
1996–2003, 2006	7th Heaven	Mary Camden	136 episodes
2004	Johnny Bravo	Herself (voice)	Episode: "Johnny Bravo Goes to Hollywood"
2005, 2013	Family Guy	Brooke Roberts (voice)	Episodes: "Brian the Bachelor", "Valentine's Day in Quahog"
2009	Saturday Night Live	Jessica Rabbit	Episode: "Dwayne Johnson/Ray LaMontagne"
2014	New Girl	Kat	Episode: "The Last Wedding"
2016–2018	BoJack Horseman	Herself (voice)	5 episodes
2017	The Sinner	Cora Tannetti	Main role (Season 1; 8 episodes) (also Producer, 2017–2021)
2019	Limetown	Lia Haddock	Main role
2021	Scooby-Doo and Guess Who?	Herself (voice)	Episode: "The Lost Mines of Kilimanjaro!"
2021–2023	Cruel Summer	—N/a	Executive producer
2022	Candy	Candy Montgomery	Also executive producer
2025	The Better Sister	Chloe	Also executive producer

=== Music videos ===
Year	Song	Artist	Notes
2001	"Fly Away from Here"	Aerosmith	
2018	"Man of the Woods"	Justin Timberlake	

== Awards and nominations ==
Awards and nominations
Award	Wins	Nominations
Golden Globe	0	2
Emmy Awards	0	1
MTV Movie & TV Awards	0	2
Ashland Independent Film Festival	1	1
Critics' Choice Television Awards	0	1
Fangoria Chainsaw Awards	0	2
Gala Awards	1	1
GLSEN Respect Awards	1	1
Golden Raspberry Awards	0	4
Newport Beach Film Festival	1	1
Prism Awards	0	1
ShoWest Convention	1	1
Young Artist Awards	1	1

Totals (Note: Certain award groups do not simply award one winner. They acknowledge several different recipients, have runners-up, and have third place. Since this is a specific recognition and is different from losing an award, runner-up mentions are considered wins in this award tally. For simplification and to avoid errors, each award in this list has been presumed to have had a prior nomination.)
- Wins: 6
- Nominations: 19

Year	Nominated work	Award	Category	Result	Refs
1998	Ulee's Gold	Young Artist Awards	Best Performance in a Feature Film: Supporting Young Actress	Won	
2004	The Texas Chainsaw Massacre	Fangoria Chainsaw Awards	Best Actress	Nominated	
2004	The Texas Chainsaw Massacre	MTV Movie & TV Awards	Best Female Breakthrough Performance	Nominated	
2005	—N/a	ShoWest Convention	Female Star of Tomorrow	Won	
2006	The Illusionist	Newport Beach Film Festival	Outstanding Achievement in Filmmaking Acting	Won	
2007	—N/a	Gala Awards	Rising Star Award	Won	
2007	Home of the Brave	Prism Awards	Performance in a Feature Film	Nominated	
2008	I Now Pronounce You Chuck & Larry, Next	Golden Raspberry Awards	Worst Supporting Actress	Nominated	
2008	I Now Pronounce You Chuck & Larry	MTV Movie & TV Awards	Best Female Performance	Nominated	
2009	Easy Virtue	Sannio FilmFest	Best Actress	Won	
2010	Valentine's Day	Teen Choice Awards	Choice Movie: Hissy Fit	Nominated	
2013	The Truth About Emanuel	Ashland Independent Film Festival	Best Acting Ensemble: Feature	Won	
2013	The Tall Man	Fangoria Chainsaw Awards	Best Actress	Nominated	
2013	Playing for Keeps, Total Recall	Golden Raspberry Awards	Worst Supporting Actress	Nominated	
2015	—N/a	GLSEN Respect Awards	Inspiration Award	Won	
2018	The Sinner	Critics' Choice Television Awards	Best Actress in a Movie/Miniseries	Nominated	
2018	The Sinner	Gold Derby TV Awards	Movie/Limited Series Actress}	Nominated	
2018	The Sinner	Golden Globe Award	Best Actress – Miniseries or Television Film	Nominated	
2018	The Sinner	Golden Globe Award	Best Miniseries or Television Film	Nominated	
2018	The Sinner	Online Film & Television Association	Best Actress in a Motion Picture or Limited Series	Nominated	
2018	The Sinner	Primetime Emmy Award	Outstanding Lead Actress in a Limited Series or Movie	Nominated	
