= David McMeeking =

NZ international rugby union player

David McMeeking MM
- Born: David Thomas McLaggan McMeeking; 30 January 1896 Alexandra, New Zealand
- Died: 30 August 1976 (aged 80) Dunedin, New Zealand
- Height: 1.71 m (5 ft 7 1/2 in)
- Weight: 73 kg (161 lb)

Rugby union career
- Position: Hooker
Provincial / State sides
Years	Team	Apps	(Points)
1922–1928	Otago		
International career
Years	Team	Apps	(Points)
1923	New Zealand	0	(0)

David Thomas McLaggan McMeeking MM (30 January 1896 – 30 August 1976) was a New Zealand rugby union player. A hooker, McMeeking represented Otago at a provincial level, and played for the New Zealand national side, the All Blacks, in two matches against the touring New South Wales team in 1923.

During World War I, McMeeking served with the New Zealand Cyclist Corps. He was awarded the Military Medal for bravery in the field as a result of actions on the morning of 1 November 1918 near Saultain in northern France. He died in Dunedin in 1976, and was buried at Andersons Bay Cemetery.
