= Sacha McMeeking =

New Zealand academic, lawyer and activist

- Born: 1977 or 1978 (age 47–48)
- Title: Associate professor and co-director of the Child Wellbeing Research Institute

Academic background
- Education: University of Canterbury (LLM); Cambridge Judge Business School (MPhil)

Academic work
- Discipline: Law; Māori and indigenous studies
- Institutions: University of Canterbury

Sacha McMeeking (born 1977 or 1978) is a New Zealand academic, lawyer, activist and strategic consultant, known for her work on behalf of Ngāi Tahu and at the University of Canterbury, where she served as the head of school of Aotahi: Māori and Indigenous Studies from 2015 to around 2022. As of 2023, she is the co-director of the university's Child Wellbeing Research Institute.

== Career ==
McMeeking earned a master's degree in law with first class honours from the University of Canterbury in 2006, and worked initially as a lawyer for the iwi of Ngāi Tahu. In this role she went to Geneva as part of a contingent reporting to the United Nations Committee on the Elimination of Racial Discrimination about New Zealand's foreshore and seabed controversy. She also lectured in law at the University of Canterbury. In around 2008 she became Ngāi Tahu's general manager of strategy and influence, a role which included responsibility for government relations. In this role, which she held until 2011, she was heavily involved on Ngāi Tahu's behalf in the National Iwi Chairs Forum.

In 2010, she received the inaugural Fulbright Harkness Scholarship which enabled her to study indigenous leadership and neo-colonial theory in the United States. After the 2011 Christchurch earthquake she coordinated the Māori Recovery Network. Together with Kaila Colbin, Vicki Buck and Sam Johnson, she was a co-founder of the Ministry of Awesome, a non-profit organisation set up to promote creativity and innovation post-earthquake. Around this time she also started her own business as a strategic consultant. In 2012, she called for the New Zealand national government to allow locally led decision-making on Christchurch's earthquake recovery.

In 2015, she was appointed to the role of head of school of Aotahi: Māori and Indigenous Studies at the University of Canterbury. During the COVID-19 pandemic she conducted research into Māori responses to COVID-19. Around 2021, she became kaihautū matua (executive director) of Te Waka Pākākano (TWP) (the university's Office of Māori, Pacific and Equity), but returned to her former role of associate professor and co-head of school in 2022 after TWP was restructured. In 2021 she also supported the launch of the Māori Futures Academy at the university, through her role as co-director of Ngāi Tahu's Tokona Te Raki Māori Futures Collective.

As of 2023, she is the co-director of the Child Wellbeing Institute at the University of Canterbury. In addition to her master's degree from the University of Canterbury, she holds an MPhil in Innovation, Strategy, and Organisation from Cambridge Judge Business School.

== Selected publications ==
- McMeeking, Sacha; Savage, Catherine (10 August 2020). "Maori Responses to Covid-19". Policy Quarterly. 16 (3). doi:10.26686/pq.v16i3.6553.
- McMeeking, Sacha; Leahy, Helen; Savage, Catherine (December 2020). "An Indigenous self-determination social movement response to COVID-19". AlterNative: An International Journal of Indigenous Peoples. 16 (4): 395–398. doi:10.1177/1177180120967730.
- McMeeking, Sacha (2018). "Ka mate kāinga tahi, ka ora kāinga rua – growing mana motuhake while fighting for it". Maori Law Review: 42–50.
- McMeeking, Sacha (2002). "The Status of Urban Maori Authorities under the Treaty of Waitangi". New Zealand Students' Law Journal. 1: 21–39.
