= François Chavane =

French film producer and screenwriter

- Born: 5 April 1910; Paris, France
- Died: 10 March 1992 (aged 81); Paris, France
- Occupations: Producer, writer
- Years active: 1936-1977 (film)

François Chavane (1910–1992) was a French film producer and screenwriter.

== Selected filmography ==
- Beautiful Star (1938)
- Marie-Martine (1943)
- The Man from London (1943)
- Florence Is Crazy (1944)
- The Eleventh Hour Guest (1945)
- Women Are Crazy (1950)
- Darling Caroline (1951)
- Two Pennies Worth of Violets (1951)
- The Case Against X (1952)
- Crimson Curtain (1952)
- A Caprice of Darling Caroline (1953)
- Les hommes ne pensent qu'à ça (1954)
- Caroline and the Rebels (1955)
- The Adventures of Arsène Lupin (1957)
- Back to the Wall (1958)
- Signé Arsène Lupin (1959)
- The Fenouillard Family (1961)
- Arsène Lupin Versus Arsène Lupin (1962)
- Coplan Takes Risks (1964)
- Untamable Angelique (1967)
- Angelique and the Sultan (1968)

== Bibliography ==
- Van Heuckelom. Polish Migrants in European Film 1918–2017. Springer, 2019.
