= Henri Bourtayre =

French composer

Henri Bourtayre (21 October 1915, Biarritz – 10 June 2009, Yvelines) was a French composer.

== Works ==
=== Operettas ===
- Miss Cow-Boy (1947, Paris, Casino-Montparnasse)
- Tout pour elles (1955, Geneva)
- Chevalier du Ciel (1955, Paris, Gaîté-Lyrique)
- Louisiane mes amours (1970, Paris, Châtelet)

=== Songs ===
- 1941: Ma Ritournelle (paroles de Maurice Vandair) – Tino Rossi;
- 1942: Dans le chemin du retour (paroles de Maurice Vandair) – Tino Rossi;
- 1942: Quérida (paroles de Maurice Vandair) – Jaime Plana; Marie José;
- 1943: La Guitare à Chiquita (paroles de Maurice Vandair) – Raymond Legrand;
- 1943: Mon cœur est toujours près de toi (paroles de Maurice Vandair) – Georges Guétary;
- 1944: El Cabrero (paroles de Maurice Vandair) – Marie José;
- 1944: Fleur de Paris (paroles de Maurice Vandair) – Maurice Chevalier, Jacques Hélian;
- 1944: Ma belle au bois dormant (paroles de Maurice Vandair) – Luis Mariano;
- 1945: Baisse un peu l’abat-jour (paroles de Marcel Delmas) – Élyane Célis;
- 1945: C’est la fête au pays (paroles de Maurice Vandair et Maurice Chevalier) – Maurice Chevalier;
- 1945: Ça fait chanter les Français (paroles de Maurice Vandair et Maurice Chevalier) – Maurice Chevalier;
- 1945: Chacun son rêve (paroles de Maurice Vandair) – Charles Trenet;
- 1945: Chansons grises… chansons roses (paroles d’Henri Kubnick) – Michel Roger;
- 1945: Lily Bye… bye ! (paroles de Maurice Vandair) – Guy Berry, Jacques Hélian;
- 1945: Feu follet (paroles d’Henri Kubnick) – Michel Roger;
- 1945: La Fille à Domingo (paroles de Maurice Vandair) – Lina Margy;
- 1946: Le Swing à l’école (paroles de Syam et Georgius) – Fred Adison;
- 1946: Pastourelle à Nina (paroles de Maurice Vandair) – Rudy Hirigoyen;
- 1946: Simple histoire (paroles d’André Hornez) – Lina Margy;
- 1946: Une Fleur sur l’oreille (paroles d’Henri Kubnick) – Guy Berry;
- 1947: Ma petite Hawaïenne (paroles de Maurice Vandair) – Tino Rossi;
- 1949: Soleil levant (paroles de Louis Poterat); Jean Faustin;
- 1950: Agur (paroles de Maurice Vandair) – André Dassary;
- 1950: La France en rose (paroles d’Albert Willemetz) – Arletty;
- 1953: Viens à la maison (paroles de Robert Lamoureux)- Robert Lamoureux;
- 1954: Il faut si peu de choses (paroles d’Albert Willemetz) – Yvonne Printemps;
- 1966: Oui au whisky (avec Jean-Pierre Bourtayre; paroles d’E. Meunier) – Maurice Chevalier.

=== Film scores ===
- 1942: Fever by Jean Delannoy
- 1943: The Exile's Song by André Hugon
- 1949: Two Loves by Richard Pottier
- 1950: La Maison du printemps by Jacques Daroy
- 1951: Piédalu in Paris by Jean Loubignac
- 1952: Piédalu Works Miracles by Jean Loubignac
- 1952: Foyer perdu by Jean Loubignac
- 1952: Son dernier Noël by Jacques Daniel-Norman
- 1959: Secret professionnel by Raoul André
- 1959: Ça n'arrive qu'aux vivants by Tony Saytor
- 1961: Alerte au barrage by Jacques-Daniel Norman
- 1973: Now Where Did the 7th Company Get to? by Robert Lamoureux
- 1974: Opération Lady Marlène, by Robert Lamoureux
- 1974: Impossible Is Not French, by Robert Lamoureux
- 1975: On a retrouvé la septième compagnie by Robert Lamoureux
- 1977: La Septième Compagnie au clair de lune by Robert Lamoureux

=== Review ===
- OctobER 1950: La Revue de l'Empire by Albert Willemetz, Ded Rysel, André Roussin, music Paul Bonneau, Maurice Yvain, Francis Lopez, Henri Bourtayre, directed by Maurice Lehmann and Léon Deutsch, Théâtre de l'Empire

=== Book ===
- Henri Bourtayre, Fleur de Paris ou 50 ans de souvenirs et de chansons françaises (240 pages booklet in accompaniment of the records Fleur de Paris. 8 May 45-8 May 95. Autour de la victoire. EMI-Une musique, 1995).

=== Records ===
- 50 ans de chansons avec Henri Bourtayre (CD de 20 chansons, Coll. Du Caf’conc’ au Music hall, EMI France, 1993)
- Fleur de Paris (20 chansons d'Henri Bourtayre), EMI, 1995
- Les Chansons de ma jeunesse. 25 artistes chantent les succès d'Henri Bourtayre. Marianne Mélodie, 2008
- Chevalier du Ciel- Miss Cow-Boy- Tout pour elle. Opérettes d'Henri Bourtayre. Marianne Mélodie, 2008
- Dansez sur les succès d'Henri Bourtayre. Marianne Mélodie, 2009
