= Piédalu Works Miracles =

1952 film

- Directed by: Jean Loubignac
- Written by: Jean Loubignac; Ded Rysel
- Produced by: Emil Flavin
- Starring: Ded Rysel; Félix Oudart; Mary Marquet
- Cinematography: René Colas
- Edited by: Jacques Mavel
- Music by: Henri Bourtayre
- Production company: Optimax Films
- Distributed by: Lux Compagnie Cinématographique de France
- Release date: 10 October 1952
- Running time: 90 minutes
- Country: France
- Language: French

Piédalu Works Miracles (French: Piédalu fait des miracles) is a 1952 French comedy film directed by Jean Loubignac and starring Ded Rysel, Félix Oudart and Mary Marquet. It was shot at the Photosonor Studios in Paris. The film's sets were designed by the art director Louis Le Barbenchon. It was one of a trilogy of films featuring the character Piédalu, following on from Piédalu in Paris.

== Synopsis ==
In a rural French settlement, the inhabitants are deeply divided over the construction of a new swimming pool. Both female and male swimming societies claim supremacy over the new pool. It falls to the well-meaning Piédalu to broker a deal between them.

== Cast ==
- Ded Rysel as Piédalu
- Félix Oudart
- Clara Tambour
- Alexandre Rignault
- Mary Marquet
- Marcelle Arnold
- Raymond Cordy
- Claire Olivier
- Jacques Berlioz
- Olivier Mathot
- Françoise Soulié
- Albert Duvaleix
- Roger Blin
- Paul Bonifas
- Max Dalban
- René Hell
- René Hiéronimus
- Robert Le Fort
- Charles Lemontier
- Christian Lude
- Julien Maffre
- Alexandre Mihalesco

== Bibliography ==
- Bessy, Maurice & Chirat, Raymond. Histoire du cinéma français: 1951–1955. Pygmalion, 1989.
- Rège, Philippe. Encyclopedia of French Film Directors, Volume 1. Scarecrow Press, 2009.
