= Old Boys of Saint-Loup =

1950 film

- Directed by: Georges Lampin
- Written by: Georges Lampin; Pierre Véry (novel)
- Produced by: Jacques Roitfeld
- Starring: François Périer; Bernard Blier; Serge Reggiani
- Cinematography: Louis Page
- Edited by: Monique Kirsanoff
- Music by: Georges Van Parys
- Production company: Les Productions Jacques Roitfeld
- Distributed by: La Société des Films Sirius
- Release date: 8 September 1950
- Running time: 90 minutes
- Country: France
- Language: French

Old Boys of Saint-Loup (French: Les anciens de Saint-Loup) is a 1950 French crime film directed by Georges Lampin and starring François Périer, Bernard Blier and Serge Reggiani. After attending a fundraising reunion at their old boarding school in the countryside, the murder of a young woman leads to an investigation.

The film's sets were designed by the art director Robert Clavel. It was shot at the Billancourt Studios in Paris.

== Cast ==
- François Périer as Charles Merlin
- Bernard Blier as Jean Laclaux
- Serge Reggiani as L'abbé Paul Forestier
- Odile Versois as Catherine Jacquelin
- Charles Vissières as Le portier
- Gabriel Gobinas Subileau
- Raphaël Patorni as Fourcade
- Maurice Régamey as Raboisson
- Pierre Mondy as Puy-Tirejol
- Johnny Chambot as Émile
- Pamela Wilde as Barbara
- Michel André as Caille
- Jean Sylvère as Abadie
- René Berthier as Lahulotte
- Serge Grave as Le Guellec
- Jacques Denoël as Espérandieu
- Robert Pouget as Maréchal
- Monique Mélinand as Hélène Laclaux
- Pierre Larquey as M. Jacquelin, directeur du collège

== Bibliography ==
- Dayna Oscherwitz & MaryEllen Higgins. The A to Z of French Cinema. Scarecrow Press, 2009.
