= The Seventh Company Outdoors =

- Directed by: Robert Lamoureux
- Written by: Robert Lamoureux; Jean-Marie Poiré
- Produced by: Alain Poiré
- Starring: Jean Lefebvre; Pierre Mondy
- Cinematography: Marcel Grignon
- Edited by: Albert Jurgenson
- Music by: Henri Bourtayre
- Distributed by: Gaumont Distribution
- Release date: 7 December 1977
- Running time: 75 minutes
- Country: France
- Language: French

The Seventh Company Outdoors (French: La Septième Compagnie au clair de lune) is a 1977 French comedy film directed by Robert Lamoureux. It is a sequel to Now Where Did the 7th Company Get to? and The Seventh Company Has Been Found.

== Cast ==
- Jean Lefebvre - Pithivier
- Pierre Mondy - Chaudard
- Henri Guybet - Tassin
- Patricia Karim - Suzanne Chaudard
- Gérard Hérold - Le commandant Gilles
- Gérard Jugnot - Gorgeton
- Jean Carmet - M. Albert, le passeur
- André Pousse - Lambert
- Michel Berto
