= Gérard Darrieu =

French actor

Gérard Darrieu (1925–2004) was a French actor. He performed on the Paris stage and in films and television.

== Selected filmography ==
- 1950: Three Telegrams (directed by Henri Decoin) - Jeune dragueur
- 1951: Juliette, or Key of Dreams - Un prisonnier (uncredited)
- 1951: Nightclub - Le groom
- 1951: Dupont Barbès
- 1952: Love Is Not a Sin - Un déménageur (uncredited)
- 1952: Three Women - Un hussard
- 1952: Le jugement de Dieu - (uncredited)
- 1952: Sins of Paris
- 1952: Crimson Curtain - Un machiniste au théâtre
- 1954: Poisson d'avril (directed by Gilles Grangier) - Le livreur de la machine à laver (uncredited)
- 1954: Le vicomte de Bragelonne
- 1955: Sophie et le Crime - L'agent cycliste au billet de loterie (uncredited)
- 1956: People of No Importance - Le routier au lapin
- 1956: Marie Antoinette Queen of France - Garde du Petit-Trianon (uncredited)
- 1956: Gervaise - Charles
- 1957: The Crucible - Cheever
- 1957: Sénéchal the Magnificent - Un gangster (uncredited)
- 1957: On Foot, on Horse, and on Wheels - Robert (uncredited)
- 1958: Maigret Sets a Trap - Un serveur (uncredited)
- 1958: Elevator to the Gallows - Maurice
- 1958: Les Misérables - Feuilly - un révolutionnaire
- 1958: Incognito - Un agent
- 1958: Sans Famille - Le braconnier
- 1958: One Life - Un pêcheur
- 1958: Young Sinners - Le camionneur
- 1959: Le fauve est lâché - (uncredited)
- 1959: Les naufrageurs
- 1959: Les Dragueurs - Un ami de Freddy
- 1959: Witness in the City - Pierre - le collègue d'Ancelin
- 1959: An Angel on Wheels - Chef de l'aéroport
- 1959: Signé Arsène Lupin - Un acolyte
- 1960: Un couple - M. Mignon
- 1960: The Cat Shows Her Claws - Jean-Lou
- 1960: Normandie - Niémen - Le Guen
- 1960: Lovers on a Tightrope - Un gendarme
- 1960: La 1000eme fenêtre - Billois
- 1960: Comment qu'elle est? - Paulo (uncredited)
- 1960: Le caïd - Le flic conférence
- 1960: The Nabob Affair
- 1961: The Fenouillard Family - Souris-Bibi
- 1961: The Three Musketeers
- 1962: The Elusive Corporal - L'homme qui louche / The cross-eyed man
- 1962: Arsène Lupin Versus Arsène Lupin - Un matelot du "Danaé" (uncredited)
- 1963: Kriss Romani - Le patron du bar (uncredited)
- 1964: Laissez tirer les tireurs - Raoul
- 1964: The Great Spy Chase - L'agent Fiduc
- 1964: Weekend at Dunkirk - Un lieutenant
- 1964: The Gorillas - Un complice de Lebavard
- 1965: Le majordome - (uncredited)
- 1966: La sentinelle endormie - Boissier
- 1966: Les malabars sont au parfum - Petrossian - un agent russe
- 1966: Mademoiselle - Boulet
- 1966: Who Are You, Polly Maggoo? - Le caméraman
- 1966: Sale temps pour les mouches - Neunoeil
- 1967: Shock Troops - Le camionneur
- 1968: Z - Barone
- 1969: L'Auvergnat et l'Autobus - Le receveur #2
- 1970: The Confession - Un policier
- 1971: Don't Deliver Us from Evil - Émile
- 1971: Laisse aller... c'est une valse
- 1973: The Hostage Gang - Maurice Perret
- 1973: The Dominici Affair - Clovis Dominici
- 1973: Décembre
- 1975: The Track - Maurois
- 1978: Paradiso - Le père
- 1980: My American Uncle - Léon Veestrate
- 1981: Le Professionnel - L'instructeur Picard
- 1981: Julien Fontanes, magistrat (TV Series, directed by Jean Pignol) - Émile Digoin
- 1981: Sans Famille (TV Series) - Père Barberin
- 1983: Sarah - A Belgian
- 1983: Les princes - Le gendarme
- 1984: P'tit Con (directed by Gérard Lauzier) - the Legionnaire
- 1991: Netchaïev est de retour - L'imprimeur
