= Zoé (film) =

1954 film

- Belgian poster
- Directed by: Charles Brabant
- Written by: Henri-François Rey; Charles Brabant; Jean Marsan
- Based on: Zoé by Jean Marsan
- Produced by: Charles Brabant
- Starring: Barbara Laage; Michel Auclair; Louis Seigner
- Cinematography: Henri Alekan
- Edited by: Maurice Serein
- Music by: Jean Solar
- Production company: Artès Films
- Distributed by: Les Films Marceau
- Release date: 8 March 1954
- Running time: 86 minutes
- Country: France
- Language: French

Zoé is a 1954 French comedy film directed by Charles Brabant and starring Barbara Laage, Michel Auclair and Louis Seigner. The film's sets were designed by the art director René Moulaert.

== Synopsis ==
The attractive Zoé is incredibly frank and open, something which causes ructions when she meets the uptight Arthur and his family.

== Cast ==
- Barbara Laage as Zoé
- Michel Auclair as Arthur Delay
- Louis Seigner as Monsieur Delay
- Jean Marchat as M Pounet
- Yolande Laffon as Mme. Pounet
- Jean-Pierre Kérien as Docteur Louis Delay
- France Roche as Madeleine Delay
- Madeleine Barbulée
- Amédée
- Michèle Nancey
- Gilberte Géniat
- Jean Harold

== Bibliography ==
- Krawc, Alfred. International Directory of Cinematographers, Set- and Costume Designers in Film: France (from the beginnings to 1980). Saur, 1983.
- Rège, Philippe. Encyclopedia of French Film Directors, Volume 1. Scarecrow Press, 2009.
