= The Slave (1953 film) =

1953 French-Italian drama film by Yves Ciampi

- Directed by: Yves Ciampi
- Written by: Jacques Dopagne; Henri-François Rey; Pierre Véry
- Produced by: Jacques Bar
- Starring: Daniel Gélin; Eleonora Rossi Drago; Barbara Laage
- Cinematography: Marcel Grignon
- Edited by: Roger Dwyre
- Music by: Georges Auric
- Production companies: Cormoran Films; Industrie Cinematografiche Sociali
- Distributed by: Diana Cinematografica; Pathé Consortium Cinéma
- Release date: 2 September 1953
- Running time: 99 minutes
- Countries: France; Italy
- Language: French

The Slave (French: L'esclave, Italian: Schiavitù) is a 1953 French-Italian drama film directed by Yves Ciampi and starring Daniel Gélin, Eleonora Rossi Drago and Barbara Laage.

== Cast ==
- Daniel Gélin as Michel Landa
- Eleonora Rossi Drago as Elena Landa
- Barbara Laage as Anne-Marie 'Fétiche'
- Gérard Landry as Bernard Turenne
- Louis Seigner as Dr. Denis
- Christine Langier as Lola
- Maurice Biraud as Le photographe
- Joëlle Bernard as Jenny
- Jean-Pierre Jorris as Roger
- Amédée as Bob Foulon
- Charles Bayard as Le critique
- Yves Brainville as Dr. Vienne
- Robert Chandeau as L'attaché de cabinet
- Max Dalban as Le consommateur
- Richard Flagey
- Harry-Max as L'imprésario
- Judith Magre as Claudie
- Mauricet as Malperthuis
- Robert Moor as Le violoniste
- Bernard Musson as Un contrebassiste
- Andréa Parisy
- André Var
- Hugues Wanner as Le commissaire
- Yvonne Yma as Mémée

== General bibliography ==
- Rège, Philippe. Encyclopedia of French Film Directors, Volume 1. Scarecrow Press, 2009.
