= Gérard Hérold =

French actor (1939–1993)

Gérard Hérold (Mulhouse, 10 September 1939 - Paris, 19 August 1993) was a French actor, appearing in several films, TV series and on theatre.

== Biography ==
Gérard Hérold was born in Alsace in Mulhouse (Haut-Rhin) on 10 September 1935. He studied acting at the School of Dramatic Art in Strasbourg. In Paris, he was able to complete his artistic training by working with actor and director Antoine Vitez and also Gérard Vergez.

He started performing in 1967 in the soap opera La vie begins at midnight in the role of 'Roland Sénéchal' alongside Geneviève Fontanel. In 1973, he played the hero in Les Fraises d'automne and King Alphonse V in the soap opera Le Secret des Flamands with Isabelle Adjani and Jean-Claude Dauphin. Édouard Molinaro then hired him in 1975 for the role of 'Delorme' in his film The Pink Phone co-starring with Mireille Darc, then by Michel Drach for Tell Me About Love (Parlez-moi d'amour), Pierre Granier-Deferre for Farewell, Chicken co-starring with Lino Ventura and José Giovanni and then in 1976 for Comme a Boomerang with Alain Delon.

In 1977, Philippe Monnier gave Gerard Hérold the role of 'Bill' alongside Claude Brasseur in Monsieur Papa and then director Robert Lamoureux gave him the role of 'Commander Gilles' in The Seventh Company in the Moonlight in 1977. Other roles in 'Death of a Rotten' with Alain Delon and the interpretation of Alain Valdez in 2 of Molinaro's films with Marie-Hélène Breillat, 'Claudine goes away' and 'Claudine en ménage'.

In the 1980s, Alain Delon hired him for his films For the Skin of a Cop and The Battant. In the German series Lindenstraße by Hans W. Geißendörfer, Gérard Hérold performed the role of 'Frédéric de Pasquale' and 'Jean-Luc Mourrait', the lover of Tanja Schildknecht (Sybille Waury). His last role was Patrick, in 1991 alongside Gerard Depardieu in My father, the hero as 'Gerard Lauzier'.

He also performed on stage in various plays, including in 1958 at Théâtre National de Strasbourg.

He was married to actress Catherine Navarro and had a daughter named Anne. He died of a heart attack on 19 August 1993.

== Filmography ==
=== Film ===
Year	Title	Role	Director	Notes
1975	The Pink Telephone	Delorme	Edouard Molinaro	
1975	Speak to Me of Love	M. Bourget	Michel Drach	
1975	Farewell Chicken	l'inspecteur Moitrié	Pierre Granier-Deferre	
1976	Boomerang	Vaulnet, the lawyer	José Giovanni	
1977	Monsieur Papa	Bill	Philippe Monnier	
1977	The Imprecator	Térenne	Jean-Louis Bertuccelli	
1977	The Seventh Company in the moonlight	Le commandant Gilles	Robert Lamoureux	
1977	Death of a Corrupt Man	Dupaire	Georges Lautner	
1979	Ciao, the guys	Roberto	Sergio Gobbi	
1980	Do not worry, it's healing	Patrice Deschamps	Eddy Matalon	
1981	Madame Claude 2	Max	François Minet	
1981	For a Cop's Hide	Pradier	Alain Delon	
1982	The Battant	Sauvat	Alain Delon	
1982	If she says yes, I do not say no	Hubert	Claude Vital	
1982	Une jeunesse		Moshé Mizrahi	Uncredited
1983	Cheat	Sauvat	Yannick Bellon	
1984	To Catch a Cop	Jean-Benoît	Michel Gérard	
1984	Polar	Foran	Jacques Bral	
1984	La triche	Gérard	Yannick Bellon	
1989	Two minutes away	Le cousin d'Henri	Éric Le Hung	
1988	Thank you Satan	Le collègue de bureau	André Farwagi	
1990	Rouget the poacher	Ulysse Leblanc	Gilles Cousin	
1991	My Father the Hero	Patrick	Gérard Lauzier	(final film role)

=== Television ===
Year	Title	Role	Notes
1966	Thierry la Fronde	Pierre de Loubet	directed by Pierre Goutas
19746	Nouvelles de Henry James	Le pasteur	TV movie, directed by Paul Seban and written by Henry James
1978	Claudine leaves	Alain Valdés	directed by Edouard Molinaro
1978	Gaston Phoebus	Charles de Navarre	directed by Bernard Borderie
1979	Histoires de voyous: Les marloupins	Jean-Louis Corbier	TV movie, directed by Michel Berny
1980	Petit déjeuner compris	Khandar	directed by Michel Berny
1980	T'inquiète pas, ça se soigne	Patrice Deschamps	
1984	Billet doux	Mathieu Dervaux	TV mini-series
1984	Disparitions	Dr. Lévy	
1989	The Saint: Wrong Number	Georges Millas	TV movie
1990	T'inquiète pas, ça se soigne	Patrice Deschamps	
1990	Blue Blood	Dubois	

== Bibliography ==
- Georges Foessel, "Gerard Georges Herold", in New Dictionary of Alsatian Biography, vol. 16, p. 1540
- Yvan Foucart, Dictionary of French comedians missing 694 portraits, 2147 names, Mormoiron, Y. Foucart, 2007, 1185 p. ( ISBN 978-2-953-11390-7 )
