= Michel Etcheverry =

French actor

Michel Etcheverry (16 December 1919 – 30 March 1999) was a French actor. First a teacher, he was fired in 1941 for refusing to make the Maréchal children sing, here we come! . He began his career in the theater as a stage manager, then joined the troupe of Louis Jouvet .

He entered the Comédie-Française in 1961, was named member in 1964, honorary member in 1984. His repertoire includes many tragedies from the classical repertoire.

== Career ==
In 1951, he resumed in Le Diable et le bon Dieu by Sartre, the role held by Jean Vilar called to the direction of the TNP. After which, he performed L'Alouette by Anouilh, Sud by Julien Green, Pygmalion by G.-B. Shaw and above all The Diary of Anne Frank (1957/58) at the Montparnasse Theater and The Annunciation Made to Marie by Paul Claudel at the Work. It was then that he entered the Comédie-Française, already a seasoned actor whose exemplary diction, intelligence and bearing soon made him an indispensable part of the troupe. His austere physique, his deep voice and the rigor of his acting serve the tragic repertoire as well as contemporary drama. Racine's great confidants (Paulin,Berenice; Narcisse, Britannicus), the noble fathers of Corneille (Don Diègue, Le Cid; Auguste, Cinna; the Old Horace, Horace; Félix, Polyeucte and Sertorius), the Don Sallust of Ruy Blas are close to the characters, with a metaphysical dimension, of Claudel (The Hard Bread, The Hostage) and Montherlant (Malatesta, The Master of Santiago, The Cardinal of Spain), as well as those of ancient tragedy (Oedipus the King, Oedipus at Colone, Antigone in Brecht's version) . But he also plays Gide, Schiller, Shakespeare, Pirandello, Strindberg, Anouilh and T.-S. Eliot.

He directed André del Sarto and Bettine by Musset, Bajazet by Racine, L'Ecole des femmes by Molière, L'Apollon de Bellac by Giraudoux, Le Carrosse du Saint-Sacrement by Mérimée, Monsieur Le Trouhadec seized by the debauchery of Jules Romains, The False Confidences of Marivaux, A Caprice by Musset and The Barber of Seville by Beaumarchais.

On television, where he appeared a lot, he was notably the Marquis de Lantenac in Quatre-vingt-treize after Victor Hugo, Don Quixote, King Lear, Un Bourgeois de Calais... not to mention the dramas produced with the French comedy. In cinema, he has participated in many films.

After the success of his interpretation of the title role of Sertorius by Pierre Corneille, he left the Comédie-Française and the theater in full glory.

== Selected filmography ==
- Without Leaving an Address (1951) - Langlois, un futur papa
- Nez de cuir (1952) - Un gentilhomme
- Matrimonial Agency (1952) - Marcel Sarlet, le fiancé de Viviane
- The Case Against X (1952) - Bertrand Moal
- Desperate Decision (1952) - Le prêtre
- Les Conquérants solitaires (1952) - Le narrateur
- Crimson Curtain (1952) - Un acteur
- The Drunkard (1953) - L'avocat général
- Rasputin (1954) - Pourlchkevitch
- The Contessa's Secret (1954) - Pietri
- Madame du Barry (1954) - L'abbé de Beauvais
- Caroline and the Rebels (1955) - Le padre
- Tower of Lust (1955) - Enguerrand de Marigny
- Papa, maman, ma femme et moi (1955) - L'explorateur
- Blackmail (1955) - Le commissaire Bretrannet
- Les Aristocrates (1955) - Le notaire Crouelles
- The Affair of the Poisons (1955) - Le prédicateur
- More Whiskey for Callaghan (1955) - Prof. Ephraim Ponticollo
- Vous pigez? (1955) - (uncredited)
- Maid in Paris (1956) - Le commissaire des mineurs
- La Sorcière (1956) - L'ingénieur Camoin
- The Wages of Sin (1956) - Docteur Maroual
- The Whole Town Accuses (1956) - Le chef des gangsters
- It Happened in Aden (1956) - Pasteur Sanderman
- Honoré de Marseille (1956) - Bob
- Michel Strogoff (1956) - Général Krisloff
- Élisa (1957) - Le président
- Fumée blonde (1957) - Vladimir
- It's All Adam's Fault (1958) - Adam de Casaubon
- Le Désert de Pigalle (1958) - Le Radiologue
- Women's Prison (1958) - Le substitut
- Les Jeux dangereux (1958) - L'aveugle
- Drôles de phénomènes (1959)
- Witness in the City (1959) - Le juge d'instruction
- Bal de nuit (1959)
- Julie the Redhead (1959) - Le notaire / Notary
- Double Agents (1959) - L'officier allemand
- Ce soir on tue (1959) - Interpol Man #2
- Signé Arsène Lupin (1959) - Van Nelden, le collectionneur
- Eyes Without a Face (1960) - Le docteur Lherminier - médecin légiste / Forensic surgeon
- Recours en grâce (1960) - L'inspecteur-chef Pardelles
- Le Panier à crabes (1960) - Bertrand
- Tomorrow Is My Turn (1960) - Ludovic
- Vers l'extase (1960) - Père Bruno
- Three Faces of Sin (1961) - Commissaire Bertrand
- Famous Love Affairs (1961) - Gaspard Bernauer (segment "Agnès Bernauer")
- Les Nouveaux Aristocrates (1961) - Le recteur
- Le petit garçon de l'ascenseur (1962) - M. Maillet
- Mathias Sandorf (1963)
- Our Agent Tiger (1965) - (uncredited)
- Paris brûle-t-il? (1966) - Préfet Luizet
- La prisonnière (1968) - Le chirurgien
- The Milky Way (1969) - L'inquisiteur / The Inquisitor
- Aminata (1971) - (voice)
- Perceval le Gallois (1978) - Le Roi Pecheur
- I as in Icarus (1979) - Frédéric Heiniger, président de la cour de justice
- Tangos, the Exile of Gardel (1985) - San Martin
- L'écrivain public (1993) - Le professeur
- A French Woman (1995) - Charles
