= The Seventh Company Has Been Found =

- French theatrical release poster
- Directed by: Robert Lamoureux
- Written by: Robert Lamoureux; Jean-Marie Poiré
- Produced by: Alain Poiré
- Starring: Jean Lefebvre; Pierre Mondy
- Cinematography: Marcel Grignon
- Edited by: Gérard Pollicand
- Music by: Henri Bourtayre
- Production companies: Gaumont International; Production 2000
- Distributed by: Gaumont Distribution
- Release date: 10 December 1975
- Running time: 87 minutes
- Country: France
- Language: French

The Seventh Company Has Been Found (French: On a retrouvé la septième compagnie) is a 1975 French comedy film directed by Robert Lamoureux. It is a sequel to Now Where Did the 7th Company Get to?.

== Cast ==
- Jean Lefebvre as le soldat Pithivier
- Pierre Mondy as le sergent-chef Chaudard
- Henri Guybet as le soldat Tassin
- Pierre Tornade as le capitaine Dumont
- Bernard Dhéran as le colonel Voisin
- Jacques Monod as le général Panadon
- René Bouloc as le soldat prisonnier qui s'indigne parce que les officiers ont des patates
- Robert Dalban as le colonel Bricard
- Jean Rougerie as le général allemand joueur d'échecs
- Érik Colin - le lieutenant Duvauchel
- Robert Lamoureux as le colonel Blanchet
- Hubert Deschamps as le pharmacien
- Nadia Barentin as la fille folle des soldats
- François Cadet as Bolatin
- Bernard Charlan as le lieutenant Piquet
- Paul Bisciglia as Claumachet, sous-officier de la 7e compagnie
- Suzanne Grey as la femme qui refuse de céder ses vaches
- Bernard Lajarrige as l'artificier
- Paul Mercey as l'homme qui doit réparer la roue du moulin
- Michel Modo as le soldat allemand (Groupir !)
- Jackie Sardou (as Jackie Rollin) - la mère Crouzy
- Robert Rollis as Cornebu
- Alexandre Grecq as le pilote du side-car
- Maurice Travail as le commandant Blin
- Marcel Gassouk
- Jean-Pierre Zola as le sous-officier allemand qui tente de loger Chaudard, Pithivier et Tassin pour la nuit
- Jean-Jacques Moreau as l'officier allemand qui s'aperçoit de l'évasion (Château vieux)
- Gerd Ammann as l'adjudant Fridem
- Herbert Fiala as l'officier du convoi
- Franz Sauer as Von Stroheim
