= Pierre Véry =

French novelist and screenwriter (1900–1960)

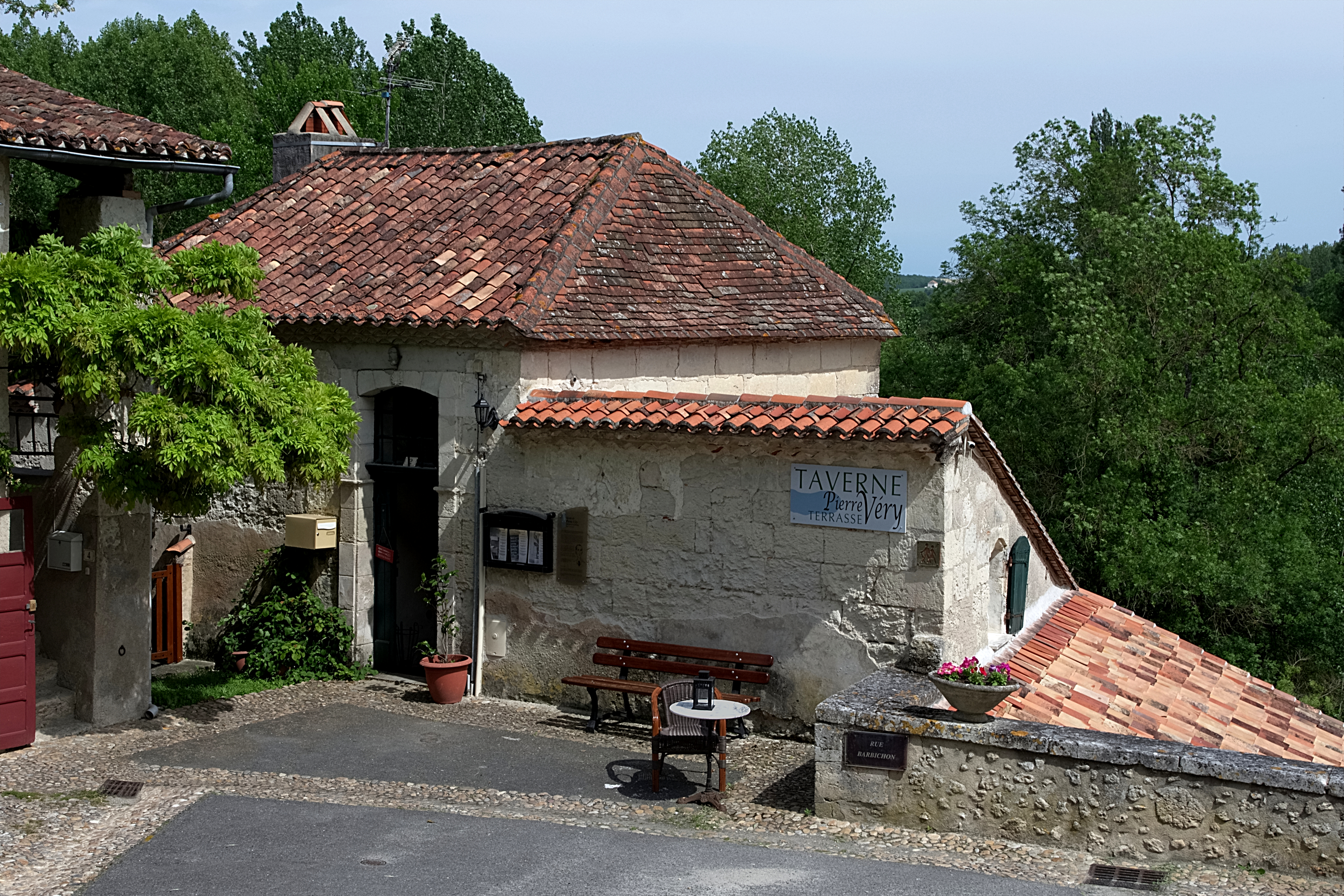
Restaurant and former Pierre Véry's house in Aubeterre, Charente, France. (P. Véry was a 20th-century's novelist and screenwriter.)

Pierre Véry (17 November 1900 in Bellon, Charente – 12 October 1960 in Paris) was a French novelist and screenwriter.

== Filmography ==
- Boys' School, directed by Christian-Jaque (1938, based on the novel Les Disparus de Saint-Agil)
- Who Killed Santa Claus?, directed by Christian-Jaque (1941, based on the novel L'Assassinat du père Noël)
- It Happened at the Inn, directed by Jacques Becker (1943, based on the novel Goupi-Mains rouges)
- Madame et le Mort, directed by Louis Daquin (1943, based on the novel Madame et le Mort)
- Land Without Stars, directed by Georges Lacombe (1946, based on the novel Le Pays sans étoiles)
- Old Boys of Saint-Loup, directed by Georges Lampin (1950, based on the novel Les Anciens de Saint-Loup)
- Great Man, directed by Yves Ciampi (1951, based on the novel Un grand patron)
- Signé Alouette, directed by Jean Vernier (1967, TV miniseries, based on the novel Signé Alouette)
- Le Gentleman des Antipodes, directed by Boramy Tioulong (1976, TV film, based on the novel Le Gentleman des Antipodes)
- Les Disparus de Saint-Agil, directed by Jean-Louis Benoît (1991, TV film, based on the novel Les Disparus de Saint-Agil)
- Goupi-Mains rouges, directed by Claude Goretta (1993, TV film, based on the novel Goupi-Mains rouges)

=== Screenwriter ===
- L'Enfer des anges (dir. Christian-Jaque, 1939)
- The Murderer is Afraid at Night (dir. Jean Delannoy, 1942)
- Melody for You (dir. Willy Rozier, 1942)
- Land Without Stars (dir. Georges Lacombe, 1946)
- Martin Roumagnac (dir. Georges Lacombe, 1946)
- The Charterhouse of Parma (dir. Christian-Jaque, 1948)
- Crossroads of Passion (dir. Ettore Giannini, 1948)
- Suzanne and the Robbers (dir. Yves Ciampi, 1949)
- Le Paradis des pilotes perdus (dir. Georges Lampin, 1949)
- Singoalla (dir. Christian-Jaque, 1949)
- Old Boys of Saint-Loup (dir. Georges Lampin, 1950)
- Lost Souvenirs (dir. Christian-Jaque, 1950)
- Great Man (dir. Yves Ciampi, 1951)
- The Slave (dir. Yves Ciampi, 1953)
- Le Guérisseur (dir. Yves Ciampi, 1953)
- Papa, Mama, the Maid and I (dir. Jean-Paul Le Chanois, 1954)
- Papa, maman, ma femme et moi (dir. Jean-Paul Le Chanois, 1955)
- Not Delivered (dir. Gilles Grangier, 1958)
- Sans famille (dir. André Michel, 1958)
