= The Fenouillard Family =

1960 film

- Directed by: Yves Robert
- Written by: Christophe (comic strip); Jean Ferry; Yves Robert
- Produced by: François Chavane
- Starring: Sophie Desmarets; Jean Richard; Annie Sinigalia
- Cinematography: André Bac
- Edited by: Marie-Josèphe Yoyotte
- Music by: Gérard Calvi
- Production companies: Production Companies Chavane; Cinéphonic; Fabre; Gaumont
- Distributed by: Gaumont Distribution
- Release date: 1960
- Running time: 78 minutes
- Country: France
- Language: French

The Fenouillard Family (French: La famille Fenouillard) is a 1960 French historical comedy film directed by Yves Robert and starring Sophie Desmarets, Jean Richard and Annie Sinigalia. It is based on a pioneering nineteenth century text comic, La Famille Fenouillard, by Georges Colomb. The film's sets were designed by the art director Paul-Louis Boutié.

== Cast ==
- Sophie Desmarets as Léocadie Fanouillard
- Jean Richard as Agénor Fenouillard
- Annie Sinigalia as Cunégonde
- Marie-José Ruiz as Artémise
- Bruno Balp
- Little Bara
- Jean Bellanger
- Charles Bouillaud
- Madeleine Clervanne as Mme de Bréauté-Beuzeville
- Gérard Darrieu as Souris-Bibi
- Gilbert Denoyan as Harris
- Hubert Deschamps as Le maître d'école
- André Gille as Follichon
- Roger Pelletier
- Yves Peneau
- Guy Piérauld
- Robert Rollis
- Henri Virlojeux as Le commandant
- Jean-Claude Arnaud
- Georges Aubert as Bordure
- André Badin
- Bernard Blier as Un voyageur
- Bernard Charlan as Antoine Petit
- Marcel Charvey
- Henri Cote
- Philippe Desboeuf as La Charente
- Alain Dumoulin as Polydore
- Pierre Duncan
- Lucien Frégis as Un voyageur
- Daniel Goldenberg as Anatole
- André Pradel
- Claude Richard
- André Weber as Nanca
- Yves Robert as Le Coq

== Bibliography ==
- Maurice Bessy & Raymond Chirat. Histoire du cinéma français: 1956-1960. Pygmalion, 1990.
