= The Uninhibited =

- Theater poster for the film
- Directed by: Juan Antonio Bardem
- Written by: Juan Antonio Bardem; Henri-François Rey
- Produced by: Raymond Borderie; Raymond Froment
- Starring: Melina Mercouri; Hardy Kruger; James Mason; Didier Haudepin; José María Mompín; Luis Induni; Maria Albaicin; Rafael Luis Calvo
- Cinematography: Gábor Pogány
- Edited by: Juan Antonio Bardem
- Music by: Georges Delerue
- Release date: 21 April 1965
- Running time: 94 minutes
- Countries: Spain; France; Italy
- Languages: Spanish; English

The Uninhibited (Spanish: Los pianos mecánicos) is a 1965 Spanish film directed by Juan Antonio Bardem, and starring Melina Mercouri, James Mason, and Hardy Kruger. It was entered into the 1965 Cannes Film Festival.

== Plot ==
A young man from Paris moves to a small Spanish village, to stay at a friend's house. He soon becomes involved in a love triangle with his friend and a local woman.

== Cast ==
- Melina Mercouri - Jenny
- Hardy Krüger - Vincent
- James Mason - Pascal Regnier
- Didier Haudepin - Daniel Regnier
- Renaud Verley - Serge
- Sophie Darès - Nadine (as Martine Ziguel)
- Keiko Kishi - Nora
- Maurice Teynac - Reginald
- Karin Mossberg - Orange the Mistress
- José María Mompín - Tom
- Luis Induni - Bryant
