= Bebert and the Train =

1963 film

Bébert et l'omnibus (Bebert and the Train)
- Directed by: Yves Robert
- Written by: François Boyer (novel)
- Produced by: Danièle Delorme; Yves Robert; Léon Carré
- Starring: Martin Lartigue; Blanchette Brunoy; Pierre Mondy; Jean Richard; Michel Serrault
- Cinematography: André Bac
- Edited by: Robert Isnardon; Monique Isnardon
- Music by: Philippe-Gérard
- Distributed by: Warner Bros.
- Release date: 1963
- Running time: 100 minutes
- Country: France
- Language: French

Bébert et l'omnibus or Bebert and the Train is a 1963 French film directed by Yves Robert. It is based on a novel by François Boyer.

Bebert and the Train was one of the most popular films of the year in France.

== Synopsis ==
A young boy becomes separated from his older brother on a train and gets taken in by a local station master until his family finds him.

== Cast ==
- Martin Lartigue (as Petit Gibus) - Bébert Martin
- Blanchette Brunoy - Mme Martin
- Pierre Mondy - Parmelin
- Jean Richard - M. Martin
- Michel Serrault - Barthoin
