= The Fatted Calf =

1939 film

- Directed by: Serge de Poligny
- Written by: Bernard Zimmer (play); Jean-Henri Blanchon
- Starring: Elvire Popesco; André Lefaur; Armand Bernard
- Cinematography: Philippe Agostini; Boris Kaufman
- Edited by: William Barache
- Music by: Henri Verdun
- Production company: Dimeco Productions
- Distributed by: DisCina
- Release date: 13 April 1939
- Running time: 85 minutes
- Country: France
- Language: French

The Fatted Calf (French: Le veau gras) is a 1939 French comedy film directed by Serge de Poligny and starring Elvire Popesco, André Lefaur and Armand Bernard. It is based on a play by Bernard Zimmer. The film's sets were designed by Jacques Colombier and Robert Gys.

== Cast ==
- Elvire Popesco as La princesse Dorothée
- André Lefaur as Jules Vachon père
- Armand Bernard as Gabriel Vachon
- Dorville as Le receveur
- Robert Le Vigan as Grussgolt
- François Périer as Gaston Vachon
- Gabrielle Fontan as Madame Vachon
- Marcelle Praince as Madame Van Houtentook
- Raymond Cordy as Le curé
- Nicolas Amato
- Yvette Andréyor as La mère de Jeanne
- Andrée Berty
- Georges Bever as François - le valet de chambre
- Huguette Boudet
- Albert Broquin as Le facteur
- Micheline Buire as Mademoiselle Jeanne
- Régine Dancourt as Louise
- Hubert de Malet as Le chauffeur de la princesse
- Edith Gallia
- Jean Kolb
- Charles Lemontier as Le juge de paix
- Nathalie Lissenko as La dame de compagnie
- Albert Malbert
- Maurice Marceau as L'ouvrier électricien
- Jean Marconi as L'entrepreneur
- Franck Maurice
- Carine Nelson as Marie - une dactylo
- Robert Ozanne as L'électricien
- Jean Parédès as Albert - le garçon de café
- Henri Richard as Le châtelain
- Eugène Stuber
- Solange Turenne as La petite fille
- Huguette Valmy
- Claire Vervin
- Marcel Vidal

== Bibliography ==
- Dayna Oscherwitz & MaryEllen Higgins. The A to Z of French Cinema. Scarecrow Press, 2009.
