= Monsieur Papa (1977 film) =

- Film poster
- Directed by: Philippe Monnier
- Written by: Philippe Monnier; Jean-Marie Poiré
- Based on: Monsieur Papa by Patrick Cauvin
- Produced by: Alain Poiré
- Starring: Claude Brasseur; Nathalie Baye
- Cinematography: Edmond Séchan
- Edited by: Marie-Josèphe Yoyotte
- Music by: Mort Shuman
- Distributed by: Gaumont Distribution
- Release date: 24 August 1977
- Running time: 105 minutes
- Country: France
- Language: French
- Box office: $3.6 million

Monsieur Papa is a 1977 French comedy film directed by Philippe Monnier and starring Claude Brasseur and Nathalie Baye. It is based on the novel Monsieur Papa by Patrick Cauvin.

== Plot ==
Monsieur Papa tells the story about the relationship between a father and his young son.

== Cast ==
- Claude Brasseur - Franck Lanier
- Nathalie Baye - Janine
- Nicolas Reboul - Laurent
- Daniel Auteuil - Dédé
- Brigitte Catillon - Martine
- Gérard Hérold - Bill
- Éva Darlan - Sylviane
- Michel Creton - Sport teacher
- Moustache - Gilles' father
- Josiane Balasko
- François Dyrek
- Jacqueline Doyen
