= Guy Favières =

Actor in France

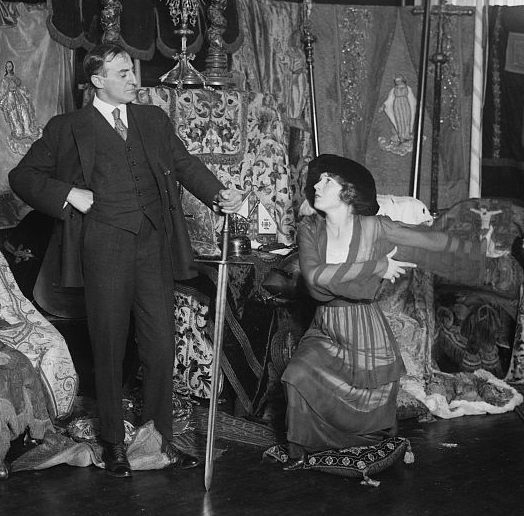
Performing with Ina Claire

Guy Favières (June 1, 1876- March 30, 1963) was an actor from France who had theatrical roles and appeared in numerous films.

He performed in Lilac Time and Sleeping Partners and was part of a show that toured the United States with Sarah Bernhardt. His portrayal of Warwick in 1925 was described as the best male acting part in the whole piece.

== Theater ==
- Hamilton (play) (1917) as Count Talleyrand
- Lilac Time
- Sleeping Partners

== Filmography ==
- Les Amours de la reine Élisabeth (1912) as Worcester
- National Red Cross Pageant (1917) as Charles VII, the Dauphin; French episode
- The Princess and the Clown (1924) as King Michel II
- Madame Sans-Gêne (1925)
- Napoléon (1927) as Joseph Fouché
- Island of Love (1929)
- Island of Love (1929)
- Accused, Stand Up! (1930) as Bailiff at the Assizes
- Monsieur le duc (1931)
- Life Belongs to Us (La vie est à nous) (1936)
- The Little Thing (1938) as Lalouette
- The Little Thing (1938) as Lalouette
- It Happened at the Inn (1943) as Goupi-The Law
- Les Enfants du Paradis (Children of Paradise) (1945) as debt collector
- Playmate of Darkness (1945)
- Panique (1946)
- Jerocho (1946) as The Mayor
- Special Mission (1946)
- Special Mission (1946)
- Land Without Stars (Le pays sans étoiles) (1946) as Joachim - Aurélia's father
- Coincidences (1947) as Françoise's father
- Monsieur Vincent (Mr. Vincent) (1947) as a bastard beggar / Poor man near the fireplace
- The Lost Village (1947) as Notary
- The Royalists (1947) as Galope Chopine
- Coincidences (1947) as Le père de Françoise
- The Lost Village (Le village perdu) (1947) as Le notaire
- Convicted (1948) as Le colonel
- Eternal Conflict (Éternel conflit) (1948) as The Inspector
- Daybreak (1949) as Un vieux mineur
- Doctor Laennec (Docteur Laennec) (1949) as The Old Man
- No Pity for Women (1950) as Guillaume
- A Certain Mister (1950) as The Sacristan
- Under the Sky of Paris (1951) as Le malade (The sick)
- Les Dents longues (The Long Teeth) (1952)
- Jocelyn (1952)
- Midnight Witness (1953) as La jardinier
- Les révoltés de Lomanach (The Mutiny / Rebels of Lomanach) (1954)
- Ni vu, ni connu (Neither seen nor known) (1958) as assistant to the mayor
