= It Happened at the Inn =

1943 film

- Directed by: Jacques Becker
- Screenplay by: Jacques Becker
- Based on: Goupi mains rouges by Pierre Véry
- Produced by: Charles Méré
- Starring: Fernand Ledoux; Robert Le Vigan; Blanchette Brunoy
- Cinematography: Jean Bourgoin
- Edited by: Marguerite Renoir
- Music by: Jean Alfaro
- Production company: Les Films Minerva
- Distributed by: Les Films Minerva
- Release date: 14 April 1943
- Running time: 104 minutes
- Country: France
- Language: French

It Happened at the Inn (French: Goupi mains rouges) is a 1943 French mystery film directed by Jacques Becker and starring Fernand Ledoux, Robert Le Vigan, Georges Rollin and Blanchette Brunoy. It follows an investigation into the family members of an old woman who has been murdered. The film is based on the 1937 novel with the same title by Pierre Véry. It was released in France on 14 April 1943.

The film was shot at the Epinay Studios in Paris, with location filming taking place around Charente.

== Cast ==
- Fernand Ledoux as Goupi-Mains rouges
- Robert Le Vigan as Goupi-Tonkin
- Georges Rollin as Goupi-Monsieur
- Blanchette Brunoy as Goupi-Muguet
- Arthur Devère as Goupi-Mes sous
- Germaine Kerjean as Goupi-Tisane
- Maurice Schutz as Goupi-L'Empereur
- Guy Favières as Goupi-La Loi
- Marcelle Hainia as Goupi-Cancan
- René Génin as Goupi-Dicton
- Albert Rémy as Jean des Goupis
- Line Noro as Marie des Goupis
- Marcel Pérès as Eusèbe, le gendarme
- Louis Seigner as L'instituteur
- Pierre Labry as Minain
- Maurice Marceau as Un porteur à la gare

== Bibliography ==
- Slide, Anthony. Selected Film Criticism: Foreign Films, 1930-1950. Scarecrow Press, 1984.
