= Pierre Mondy =

French actor and director (1925–2012)

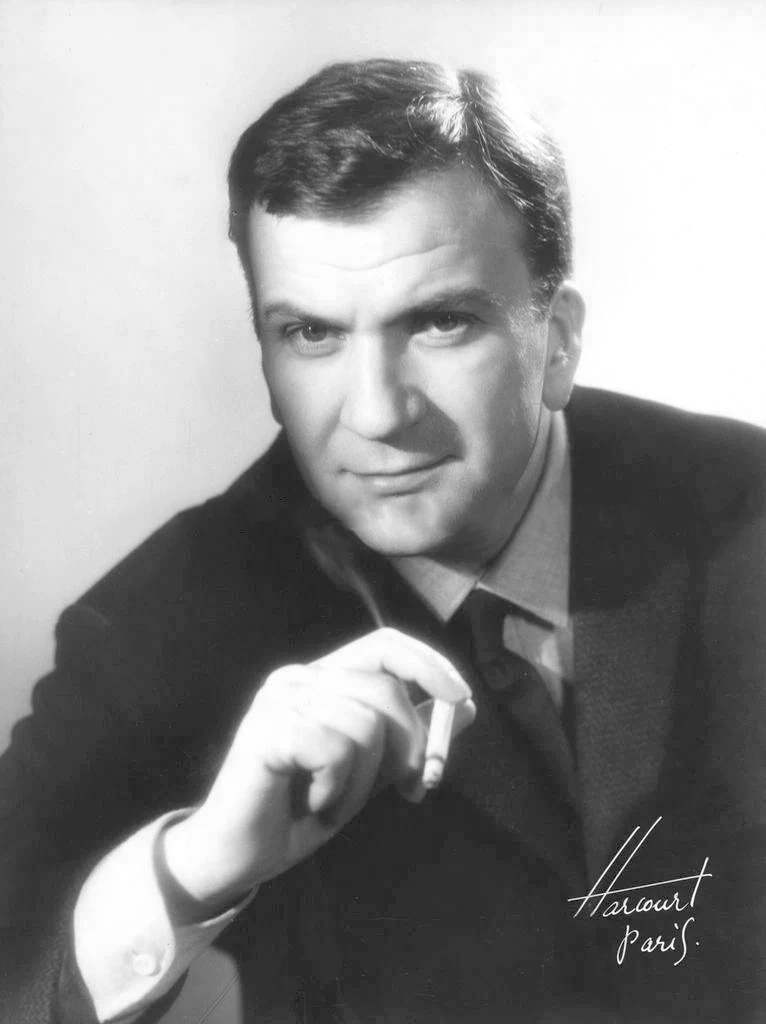
- Mondy in 1958
- Born: Pierre Cuq; 10 February 1925; Neuilly-sur-Seine, France
- Died: 15 September 2012 (aged 87); Paris, France
- Occupation: Actor
- Height: 1.68 m (5 ft 6 in)
- Spouses: Pascale Roberts (divorced); Claude Gensac; Annie Fournier; Catherine Allary

Pierre Mondy (born Pierre Cuq; 10 February 1925 – 15 September 2012) was a French film and theatre actor and director.

== Personal life ==
Born on 10 February 1925, he was married four times: to Claude Gensac, Pascale Roberts, Annie Fournier, and Catherine Allary, all actresses. He died on 15 September 2012, aged 87, from lymphoma.

== Career ==
Mondy's first on-screen appearance was in 1949 in Jacques Becker's Rendez-vous de juillet and he appeared in over 140 films over the course of his career. In 1960, he received international recognition for the role of Napoléon Bonaparte in the film Austerlitz directed by Abel Gance. In the 1970s, his most successful film was the comedy Mais où est donc passée la septième compagnie?. From 1992 until 2005, he appeared in the French television series Les Cordier, juge et flic.

As a voice actor, he voiced Caius Obtus in Asterix et la Surprise de Cesar (Asterix vs. Caesar; 1985) and Cetinlapsus in Asterix Chez Le Bretons (Asterix in Britain; 1986).

Mondy directed four films and thirteen television episodes, and wrote two television screenplay adaptions. He also directed over 60 theatre productions, many of them at the Théâtre du Palais-Royal in Paris. In 1973 he directed the first production of La Cage aux folles starring Jean Poiret and Michel Serrault.

== Television ==
Year	Title	Role	Director	Notes
2009	Kaamelott	Emperor Caesar	Alexandre Astier	

== Theater ==
Year	Title	Author	Director	Notes
1987	Two into One	Ray Cooney	Pierre Mondy	Nominated - Molière Award for Best Director
1989	La Présidente	Maurice Hennequin & Pierre Veber	Pierre Mondy	Nominated - Molière Award for Best Director

== Filmography ==
Year	Title	Role	Director	Notes
1949	Rendezvous in July	The student's friend	Jacques Becker	Uncredited
1950	Les anciens de Saint-Loup	Le marquis Patrice de Puy-Tirejol	Georges Lampin	
1950	Souvenirs perdus	The Agent	Christian-Jaque	(segment "Le violon"), Uncredited
1951	Without Leaving an Address	Forestier's Friend	Jean-Paul Le Chanois	
1951	Victor	An inmate	Claude Heymann	
1952	Le costaud des Batignolles	Bébert	Guy Lacourt	
1952	Souvenirs perdus	Georges	Un jour avec vous	
1952	Matrimonial Agency	Le client de l'agence 'Nuptia' #2	Jean-Paul Le Chanois (2)	
1952	The Happiest of Men	Inspector Gaston	Yves Ciampi	
1953	Les Compagnes de la nuit	Sylvestre	Ralph Habib	
1953	Capitaine Pantoufle	Henri	Guy Lefranc	
1953	Le Guérisseur	Robert	Yves Ciampi (2)	
1954	Crainquebille	La Trogne	Ralph Habib	
1954	Tout chante autour de moi	Paul Nollier	Pierre Gout	
1955	Les Chiffonniers d'Emmaüs	Thomas	Robert Darène	
1955	Casse-cou, mademoiselle!	Marchand	Christian Stengel	
1955	Cherchez la femme	Georges Tessard	Raoul André	
1955	The Affair of the Poisons	Le capitaine François Desgrez	Henri Decoin	
1956	People of No Importance	Pierrot Berty	Henri Verneuil	
1956	Folies-Bergère	Roger	Henri Decoin	
1957	Que les hommes sont bêtes	Josélito	Roger Richebé	
1957	The She-Wolves	André Vilsan	Luis Saslavsky	
1957	La roue	Jean Marcereau	André Haguet and Maurice Delbez	
1957	Méfiez-vous fillettes	Tonio	Yves Allégret	
1957	Send a Woman When the Devil Fails	Commissaire Verdier	Yves Allégret	
1957	The Tricyclist	Un gendarme	Jack Pinoteau	
1957	Anyone Can Kill Me	Émile Chanu	Henri Decoin	
1957	The Lady Doctor	Romeo, cammeriere di De Vitti	Camillo Mastrocinque	
1958	Le temps des oeufs durs	Le maître nageur	Norbert Carbonnaux	
1958	Neither Seen Nor Recognized	M. Bluette	Yves Robert	
1958	Chéri, fais-moi peur	Le commissaire Morel	Jack Pinoteau	
1958	En légitime défense	Petit Bob	André Berthomieu	
1958	Life Together	Monsieur Lebeaut	Clément Duhour	
1958	Cigarettes, Whiskey and Wild Women	Max	Maurice Régamey	
1959	Women Are Weak	André, Agathe's Husband	Michel Boisrond	
1959	Vous n'avez rien à déclarer?	Alfred Dupont	Clément Duhour	
1959	Way of Youth	Lulu	Michel Boisrond	
1960	Les Loups dans la bergerie	Charlot	Hervé Bromberger	
1960	Austerlitz	Napoléon Bonaparte	Abel Gance	
1960	It Happened All Night	Antoine Fiesco	Henri Verneuil	
1960	Love and the Frenchwoman	Edouard, Bichette's father	various directors	(segment "Adolescence, L'")
1960	Boulevard	Dicky	Julien Duvivier	
1961	Dans la gueule du loup	Commissaire Rémy	Jean-Charles Dudrumet	
1961	Les moutons de Panurge	Un voisin de table au restaurant	Jean Girault	Uncredited
1961	The Count of Monte Cristo	Caderousse	Claude Autant-Lara	
1962	Girl on the Road	Le manager	Jacqueline Audry	
1962	Le Crime ne paie pas	Clerget, le détective	Gérard Oury	(segment "L'affaire Hugues"), Uncredited
1962	The Law of Men	Le juge Béguin	Charles Gérard	
1962	The Mysteries of Paris	Le Chourineur	André Hunebelle	
1963	Jusqu'au bout du monde	Pierre	François Villiers	
1963	People in Luck	Henri Duchemin	Philippe de Broca and Jean Girault	(segment "Le yacht")
1963	Bebert and the Train	Parmelin	Yves Robert	
1963	Son of the Circus	Philip Nardelli	Sergio Grieco	
1964	Mission to Venice	Paul Trégard	André Versini	
1964	À couteaux tirés	Robert Antonini	Charles Gérard	
1964	Requiem pour un caïd	Antoine Delille	Maurice Cloche	
1964	Weekend at Dunkirk	Dhéry	Henri Verneuil	
1965	Les copains	Broudier	Yves Robert	
1965	The Sleeping Car Murders	Le commissaire Tarquin	Costa-Gavras	
1966	Le facteur s'en va-t-en guerre	Massenet	Claude Bernard-Aubert	
1966	Monsieur le Président Directeur Général (Appelez-moi Maître)	Denis Bonneval	Jean Girault	
1967	The Night of the Generals	Kopatski	Anatole Litvak	
1969	Pierre et Paul	Pierre	René Allio	
1969	Appelez-moi Mathilde	Le commissaire	Pierre Mondy	Uncredited
1971	Papa les petits bateaux...	Jeannot le Corse	Nelly Kaplan	
1972	Les malheurs d'Alfred	François Morel	Pierre Richard	
1973	Forbidden Priests	Paul Lacoussade	Denys de La Patellière	
1973	Now Where Did the 7th Company Get to?	Sergent Louis Chaudard	Robert Lamoureux	
1974	Vos gueules les mouettes!	Bibi Kenavec	Robert Dhéry	
1974	Impossible Is Not French	Antoine Brisset	Robert Lamoureux	
1975	L'agression	Sauguet	Gérard Pirès	Voice, Uncredited
1975	Vous ne l'emporterez pas au paradis	Olivier Galmisch	François Dupont-Midi	
1975	The Pink Telephone	Benoît Castejac	Édouard Molinaro	
1975	The Seventh Company Has Been Found	Sergent Chaudard	Robert Lamoureux	
1977	Dernière sortie avant Roissy	Marlys	Bernard Paul	
1977	The Seventh Company Outdoors	Chaudard	Robert Lamoureux	
1978	Le beaujolais nouveau est arrivé	Georges	Jean-Luc Voulfow	
1978	Vas-y maman	Jean-Pierre Larcher	Nicole de Buron	
1978	La Cage aux Folles	Renato Baldi	Édouard Molinaro	(French version), Voice
1979	Démons de midi	François	Christian Paureilhe	
1980	Retour en force	Roger	Jean-Marie Poiré	
1981	Signé Furax	Amédée Gonflard	Marc Simenon	
1982	Bankers Also Have Souls	Grégoire Dufour	Michel Lang	
1983	Le Braconnier de Dieu	Brother Grégoire	Jean-Pierre Darras	
1983	Le Battant	Rouxel	Alain Delon	
1983	Si elle dit oui... je ne dis pas non	Marcel Thiebault	Claude Vital	
1984	Pinot simple flic	Rochu	Gérard Jugnot	
1985	Slices of Life	Le Président	François Leterrier	
1985	Asterix Versus Caesar	Caius Obtus	Gaëtan Brizzi and Paul Brizzi	Voice
1986	Asterix in Britain	Cetinlapsus	Pino Van Lamsweerde	Voice
1992	Cerveny cigán			
1994	The Favourite Son	Le dentiste usurier	Nicole Garcia	
2003	Lovely Rita, sainte patronne des cas désespérés	Marcel	Stéphane Clavier	
2008	A Man and His Dog	Baptistin	Francis Huster	
