= The Adventures of Arsène Lupin =

1957 film

- Theatrical release poster
- Directed by: Jacques Becker
- Written by: Jacques Becker; Maurice Leblanc; Albert Simonin
- Based on: Arsène Lupin, Gentleman Burglar by Maurice Leblanc
- Produced by: Jules Borkon; François Chavane; Alain Poiré; Mario Gabrielli; Jean Le Duc
- Starring: Robert Lamoureux
- Cinematography: Edmond Séchan
- Edited by: Geneviève Vaury
- Music by: Jean-Jacques Grünenwald
- Distributed by: Gaumont Distribution
- Release date: 22 March 1957
- Running time: 104 minutes
- Countries: France; Italy
- Language: French

The Adventures of Arsène Lupin (French: Les Aventures d'Arsène Lupin) is a 1957 French crime film directed by Jacques Becker. It was entered into the 7th Berlin International Film Festival. It was followed by Signé Arsène Lupin.

== Plot ==
The film narrates the adventures of Arsène Lupin, the famous character of the gentlemen burglar conceived by Maurice Leblanc in 1905. The story is set in Paris at the end of the nineteenth century, where the cunning thief managed to mock the prefect of police, Kaiser Wilhelm II and Baroness Von Kraft, who had been fascinated by his gallantry and his legendary shrewdness.

== Cast ==
- Robert Lamoureux as André Larouche / Arsène Lupin / Aldo Parolini
- Liselotte Pulver as Mina von Kraft
- O. E. Hasse as Kaiser Wilhelm II
- Daniel Ceccaldi as Jacques Gauthier
- Georges Chamarat as Inspecteur Dufour
- Huguette Hue as Léontine Chanu
- Renaud Mary as Paul Desfontaines
- Sandra Milo as Mathilde Duchamp
- Paul Muller as Rudolf von Kraft
- Henri Rollan as Le Président du Conseil Emile Duchamp
- Margaret Rung as The English woman
- Charles Bouillaud as Otto
- Hubert de Lapparent as Jewellery salesman
- Pierre Stéphen as Clérissy
- Jacques Becker as The kronprinz
- Paul Préboist as The groom

== Production ==
Principal photography took place from 3 July to 1 September 1956, with scenes shot at Studios de Saint-Maurice in Saint-Maurice (Val-de-Marne). The film was also partially shot at the Château du Haut-Koenigsbourg in Orschwiller (Bas-Rhin).
