= The Respectful Prostitute (film) =

1952 film directed by Marcello Pagliero

- Directed by: Marcello Pagliero; Charles Brabant
- Written by: Alexandre Astruc; Jean-Paul Sartre
- Produced by: Georges Agiman; Charles Brabant
- Starring: Barbara Laage; Ivan Desny; Marcel Herrand
- Cinematography: Eugen Schüfftan
- Edited by: Monique Kirsanoff
- Music by: Georges Auric
- Production companies: Artès Films; Les Films Agiman
- Distributed by: Les Films Marceau
- Release date: 8 October 1952
- Running time: 95 minutes
- Country: France
- Language: French

The Respectful Prostitute (French: La Putain respectueuse) is a 1952 French crime drama film directed by Marcello Pagliero and starring Barbara Laage, Ivan Desny and Marcel Herrand. It is an adaptation of Jean-Paul Sartre's 1946 play The Respectful Prostitute. It was shot at the Photosonor Studios in Courbevoie. The film's sets were designed by the art director Maurice Colasson.

== Cast ==
- Barbara Laage as Lizzie Mac-Kay, singer hostess
- Ivan Desny as Fred Clarke, the son of the senator
- Schetting as Sidney, the Negro
- Walter Bryant as Teddy Barnes, the nephew of the senator
- Marcel Herrand as the senator Edouard Clarke
- Yolande Laffon as Marie, the sister of the senator
- Marie Olivier as Annie, a companion of Lizzie
- André Valmy as Georges, the boss of the club
- Jacques Hilling as the drunkard of the night club
- Jean Danet as a client of the night club
- Byron et O'Thella as the stars of the club
- Grégoire Gromoff as a client of the night club
- Louis de Funès as a client of the night club
- Jack Ary as a lorry driver
- Luc Andrieux as the barman
- François Joux as the television journalist
- Nicolas Vogel as a client of the night club
- Robert Mercier as a man in the garage
- Jean Minisini as a man in the cabaret
- Gil Delamare as a man in the garage

== Bibliography ==
- Bessy, Maurice & Chirat, Raymond. Histoire du cinéma français: 1951-1955. Pygmalion, 1989.
- Goble, Alan. The Complete Index to Literary Sources in Film. Walter de Gruyter, 1999.
- Rège, Philippe. Encyclopedia of French Film Directors, Volume 1. Scarecrow Press, 2009.
