= Barbara Laage =

French film actress (1920–1988)

- Born: Claire Colombat; July 20, 1920; Menthon-Saint-Bernard, France
- Died: May 21, 1988 (aged 67); Deauville, France
- Years active: 1942–1976

Barbara Laage (30 July 1920 – 21 May 1988) was a French film actress who flourished in the 1950s.

== Career ==
After fleeing Paris with her family during the German occupation in World War II, Laage returned to the city after the war and commenced her acting career in the Paris theatre district of Montparnasse.

Her first move to Hollywood was arranged by theatrical agent William Morris, founder of the William Morris Agency. She is one of several Hollywood stars of the era that would frequent the Chateau Marmont.

She was the first choice for the lead role in the Orson Welles film The Lady from Shanghai, though the part was eventually awarded to Rita Hayworth.

== Partial filmography ==
- Signé illisible (1942)
- B.F.'s Daughter (1948) - Eugenia Taris
- The Red Rose (1951) - Claire Claris - la photographe
- The Respectful Prostitute (1952) - Lizzie Mac-Kay - chanteuse entraîneuse
- The Slave (1953) - Anne-Marie 'Fétiche'
- Traviata '53 (1953) - Rita
- Act of Love (1953) - Nina
- Zoé (1954) - Zoé
- Quay of Blondes (1954) - Barbara
- A Parisian in Rome (1954) - Germaine, la Parigina
- Nagana (1955) - Geneviève Larguillière
- The Adventures of Gil Blas (1956) - Antonia Caldera
- Guilty? (1956) - Jaqueline Delbois
- Les Assassins du dimanche (1956) - Simone Simonet
- The Happy Road (1957) - Suzanne Duval
- Action immédiate (1957) - Hiedi Effen
- Deuxième Bureau contre inconnu (1957) - Mariana
- Miss Pigalle (1958) - Yvonne Pigalle
- Un mundo para mí (1959) - Isabelle
- Ce soir on tue (1959) - Nelly
- Orientalische Nächte (1960) - Arlette
- Bombs on Monte Carlo (1960) - Olga
- Le caïd (1960) - Rita
- Ça va être ta fête (1960) - Michèle Laurent
- Paris Blues (1961) (with Paul Newman) - Marie Séoul
- Le captif (1962) - Sylvie Hamelin
- Portuguese Vacation (1963) - Barbara
- The Crime of Aldeia Velha (1964) - Joana
- O Corpo Ardente (1966) - Marcia
- Drôle de jeu (1968) - Mathilde
- Therese and Isabelle (1968) - Thérèse's mother
- Bed and Board (1970) - Monique, la secrétaire
- Défense de savoir (1973) - Mme Christiani
- Projection privée (1973) - Madeleine
