= Impossible Is Not French =

- Directed by: Robert Lamoureux
- Written by: Robert Lamoureux
- Produced by: Jacques Marin
- Starring: Jean Lefebvre; Pierre Mondy; Pierre Tornade
- Cinematography: Marcel Grignon
- Edited by: Gérard Pollicand
- Music by: Henri Bourtayre
- Production companies: Multimédia; Promocinéma; Sancrosiap
- Distributed by: AMLF
- Release date: 11 December 1974
- Running time: 90 minutes
- Country: France
- Language: French

Impossible Is Not French (French: Impossible... pas français) is a 1974 French comedy film directed by Robert Lamoureux and starring Jean Lefebvre, Pierre Mondy and Pierre Tornade.

== Cast ==
- Jean Lefebvre as Louis Brisset
- Pierre Mondy as Antoine Brisset
- Pierre Tornade as Albert Lombard
- France Dougnac as Catherine Brisset
- Robert Lamoureux as The Gardener
- Michel Creton as Francky
- Hubert Godon as Bernard
- Jacques Marin as Dussautoy
- Claire Maurier as Mauricette Brisset
- Jean-Paul Moulinot as De Sica
- Louison Roblin as Madeleine
- Gabriele Tinti as Count Jean-Charles de Bonfort
- Magali Vendeuil as Francine Brisset
- Yves Vincent as Nadar
- Marthe Villalonga as La gardienne d'immeuble

== Bibliography ==
- Rège, Philippe. Encyclopedia of French Film Directors, Volume 1. Scarecrow Press, 2009.
