= Who Killed Santa Claus? =

1941 film

- Film poster
- Directed by: Christian-Jaque
- Written by: Charles Spaak
- Based on: Who Killed Santa Claus? by Pierre Véry
- Produced by: Alfred Greven
- Starring: Harry Baur; Raymond Rouleau; Robert Le Vigan; Fernand Ledoux
- Cinematography: Armand Thirard
- Edited by: René Le Hénaff
- Music by: Henri Verdun
- Production company: Continental Films
- Distributed by: Films Sonores Tobis
- Release date: 16 October 1941
- Running time: 105 minutes
- Country: France
- Language: French

Who Killed Santa Claus? (French: L'Assassinat du père Noël) is a 1941 French comedy-drama mystery film directed by Christian-Jaque and starring Harry Baur, Raymond Rouleau and Robert Le Vigan. This adaptation of Pierre Véry's 1934 novel of the same name was the first film produced by Continental Films. It was shot at the Neuilly Studios in Paris and on location at Chamonix in the French Alps. The films sets were designed by the art director Guy de Gastyne.

== Cast ==
- Harry Baur as Gaspard Cornusse
- Raymond Rouleau as Roland de La Faille
- Renée Faure as Catherine Cornusse
- Robert Le Vigan as Léon Villard, the schoolmaster
- Fernand Ledoux as Noirgoutte, the mayor
- Jean Brochard as Ricomet, the pharmacist
- Héléna Manson as Marie Coquillot
- Arthur Devère as Tairraz, the watchmaker
- Marcel Pérès as Rambert
- Georges Chamarat as Constable Gercourt
- Bernard Blier as police sergeant
- Jean Sinoël as Noblet
- Marie-Hélène Dasté as Mother Michel
- Jean Parédès as Kappel, the beadle

== Bibliography ==
- Leteux, Christine. Continental Films: French Cinema under German Control. University of Wisconsin Press, 2022.
