= Yves Robert =

French director (1920-2002)

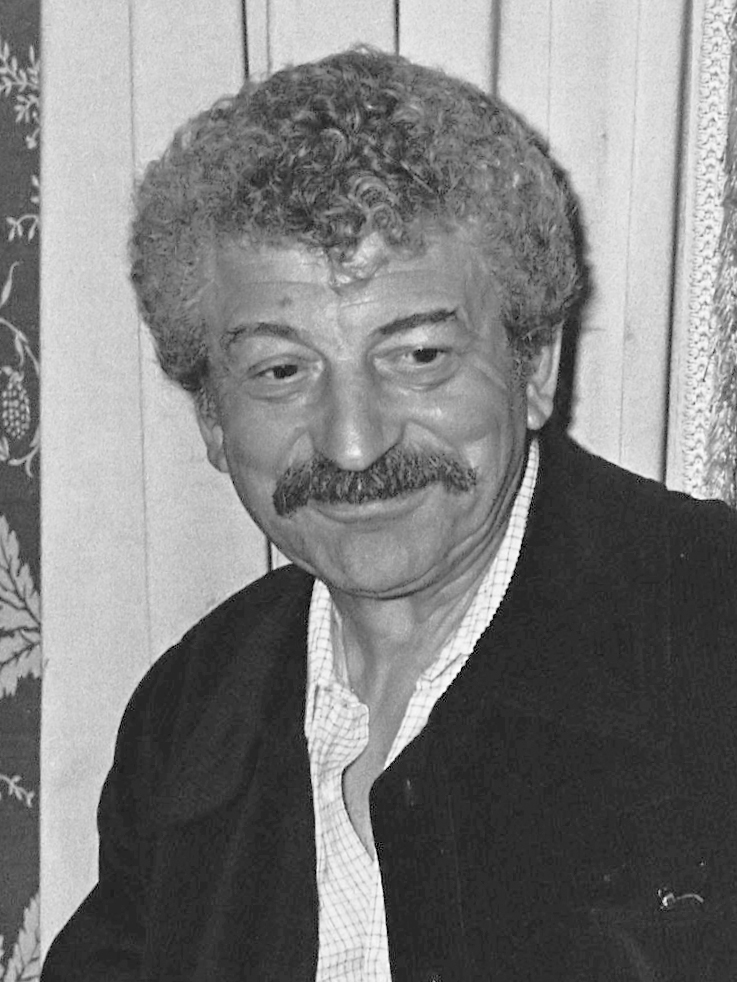
- Robert in 1979
- Born: 19 June 1920; Saumur, Maine-et-Loire, France
- Died: 10 May 2002 (aged 81); Paris, France
- Resting place: Montparnasse cemetery
- Occupations: Actor, director, producer, screenwriter
- Years active: 1948–2001
- Spouse: Danièle Delorme (m. 1956–2002)
- Relatives: Xavier Gélin (stepson, deceased)

Yves Robert (French pronunciation: [iv ʁɔbɛʁ]; 19 June 1920 – 10 May 2002) was a French actor, screenwriter, director, and producer.

== Life and career ==
Robert was born in Saumur, Maine-et-Loire, France. In his teens, he went to Paris to pursue a career in acting, starting with unpaid parts on stage in the city's various theatre workshops. From ages 12–20 he set type as a typographer, then studied mime in his early 20s. In 1948 he made his motion picture debut with one of the secondary roles in the film, Les Dieux du dimanche. Within a few years, Robert was writing scripts, directing, and producing.

Yves Robert's directorial efforts included several successful comedies for which he had written the screenplay. His 1962 film, La Guerre des boutons won France's Prix Jean Vigo. His 1972 film The Tall Blond Man with One Black Shoe won the Silver Bear at the 23rd Berlin International Film Festival in 1973. In 1976, Pardon Mon Affaire, starring his wife, earned him international acclaim. Robert's 1973 devastating comedy Hail the Artist is considered by many performers to be the ultimate film about the humiliations of the actor's life. In 1977, he directed another comedy, Pardon Mon Affaire, Too!, which was nominated for a César Award for Best Film.

In 1990, Robert directed two dramatic films, My Mother's Castle and My Father's Glory. Based on autobiographical novels by Marcel Pagnol, they were jointly voted "Best Film" at the 1991 Seattle International Film Festival, and received rave reviews. Over his career, he directed more than twenty feature-length motion pictures, wrote an equal number of scripts, and acted in more than seventy-five films. Although his last major role was perhaps in 1980, A Bad Son by Claude Sautet, as the working-class father of a drug-dealer, he continued acting past 1997.

Robert played opposite Danièle Delorme in the 1951 play Colombe by Jean Anouilh. They married in 1956, and jointly formed the film production company La Guéville in 1961. La Guéville also released several films by Monty Python and Terry Gilliam, which was very influential into establishing the comedy troupe to French audiences. He died in Paris on 10 May 2002 from a cerebral hemorrhage. He was buried in Montparnasse Cemetery with the epitaph "A man of joy ...", where visitors leave buttons of many colors. He was survived by Danièle and two children, Anne and Jean-Denis Robert, by first wife, actress Rosy Varte. That month's Cannes Film Festival paid homage to his contribution to French film.

== Selected filmography ==
Director

- Les hommes ne pensent qu'à ça (1954) English: Men Think Only of That
- Neither Seen Nor Recognized (1958) French: Ni vu, ni connu
- Signé Arsène Lupin (1959) English: Signed, Arsene Lupin
- The Fenouillard Family (1960) French: La Famille Fenouillard
- War of the Buttons (1962) French: La Guerre des bouton
- Bebert and the Train (1964) French: Bébert et l'omnibus
- Les Copains (1965)
- Monnaie de singe (1966) English: Monkey Money
- Very Happy Alexander (1968) French: Alexandre le bienheureux
- Clérambard (1969)
- The Tall Blond Man with One Black Shoe (1972) French: Le grand blond avec une chaussure noire
- Hail the Artist (1973) French: Salut l'artiste
- The Return of the Tall Blond Man with One Black Shoe (1974) French: Le Retour du Grand Blond
- Pardon Mon Affaire (1976) French: Un éléphant ça trompe énormément
- Pardon Mon Affaire, Too! (1977) French: Nous irons tous au paradis
- Courage fuyons (1979) English: Courage - Let's Run
- The Twin (1984) French: Le jumeau
- My Father's Glory (1990) French: La Gloire de mon père
- My Mother's Castle (1990) French: Le château de ma mère
- Le Bal des casse-pieds (1992)
- Montparnasse-Pondichéry (1994)

Actor

- Les dieux du dimanche (1949) - Guillot
- Le tampon du capiston (1950) - Pastini
- Three Telegrams (1950) French: 3 télégrammes - Sergent Gaston Chauvin
- Bibi Fricotin (1951) - Antoine Gardon
- The Red Rose (1951) French: La rose rouge - Yves Gérard
- Juliette, or Key of Dreams (1953) French: Juliette, ou la Clé des songes - L'accordéoniste
- Two Pennies Worth of Violets (1951) French: Deux sous de violettes - Charlot
- Follow That Man (1953) French: Suivez cet homme - Inspecteur Paulhan
- Virgile (1953) - Esposito
- Les hommes ne pensent qu'à ça (1954) English: Men Think Only of That - L'ancien combattant / Un marcheur
- Service Entrance (1954) French: Escalier de service - Courbessac
- School for Love (1955) French: Futures vedettes - Clément
- Les mauvaises rencontres (1955) English: Bad Liaisons - L'inspecteur Forbin
- The Grand Maneuver (1955) French: Les Grandes Manœuvres - Le lieutenant Félix Leroy
- The Terror with Women (1956) French: La terreur des dames - Le journaliste Labarge
- Folies-Bergère (1957) - Jeff
- Les Truands (1957) English: Lock up your spoons, or The Gangsters - Amédée Benoit / Son père
- Neither Seen Nor Recognized (1958) French: Ni vu, ni connu - Le photographe (uncredited)
- Les femmes sont marrantes (1958) - Christian
- Nina (1959) - Redon-Namur
- Le petit prof (1959) - Docteur Aubin
- The Green Mare (1959) French: La jument verte - Zèphe Maloret
- Signé Arsène Lupin (1959) English: Signed, Arsene Lupin - La Ballu
- La Brune que voilà (1960) - Le mécanicien
- Love and the Frenchwoman (1960) French: La Française et l'Amour - Traveller (segment "Mariage, Le")
- The Fenouillard Family (1960) French: La Famille Fenouillard - Le Coq (uncredited)
- The Passion of Slow Fire (1961) French: La Mort de Belle - Le barman / Bartender
- Cléo from 5 to 7 (1962) French: Cléo de 5 à 7 - Le vendeur de mouchoirs (uncredited)
- Bebert and the Train (1964) French: Bébert et l'omnibus - Chaussin - l'amant d'Henriette (uncredited)
- La communale (1965) - L'oncle Henri
- King of Hearts (1966) French: Le Roi de cœur - Le général Baderna (uncredited)
- An Idiot in Paris (1967) French: Un idiot à Paris - Marcel Pitou, l'évadé des HLM / Man by the Seine
- The Most Beautiful Month (1968) French: Le mois le plus beau - Le cheminot
- Clérambard (1969) - Le dragon qui entre chez la Langouste (uncredited)
- Le pistonné (1970) - Monsieur Langmann - le père
- Le Voyou (1970) English: The Crook - Le commissaire
- Distracted (1970) - Le locataire (uncredited)
- Le cinéma de papa (1971) - Henri Roger Langmann
- Le Cri du cormoran, le soir au-dessus des jonques (1971) - Le commissaire
- Le Viager (1972) - Bucigny-Dumaine (le bel officier)
- Les malheurs d'Alfred (1972) English: The Troubles of Alfred - L'observateur parisien
- L'aventure, c'est l'aventure (1972) - L'avocat de la défense
- Dear Louise (1972) French: Chère Louise - Magnetto, le marchand de cycles
- Repeated Absences (1972) French: Absences répétées - Le père de François
- The Tall Blond Man with One Black Shoe (1972) French: Le grand blond avec une chaussure noire - Le chef d'orchestre (uncredited)
- La raison du plus fou (1973) - Le contrôleur des chemins de fer
- Hail the Artist (1973) French: Salut l'artiste - Le metteur en scène de théâtre (uncredited)
- La grande Paulette (1974) - Le voyageur
- The Return of the Tall Blond Man with One Black Shoe (1974) French: Le Retour du Grand Blond - Le chef d'orchestre (uncredited)
- Special section (1975) French: Section spéciale - Émile Bastard
- Trop c'est trop (1975)
- The Judge and the Assassin (1976) French: Le Juge et l'assassin - Prof. Degueldre
- Little Marcel (1976) French: Le Petit Marcel - Le commissaire Mancini
- Ils sont grands, ces petits (1979) - Le père de Louise
- Woman Between Wolf and Dog (1979) French: Femme entre chien et loup - Werkman
- A Bad Son (1980) French: Un mauvais fils - René Calgagni
- Le rose et le blanc (1982) - Le barman des Caraïbes
- Vive la sociale! (1983) - Jojo, le père
- Waiter! (1983) French: Garçon! - Simon
- The Twin (1984) French: Le jumeau - L'homme dans l'ascenseur (uncredited)
- Billy Ze Kick (1985) - Alcide
- Le Débutant (1986) - L'homme dans l'escalier (uncredited)
- Fucking Fernand (1987) - Le récitant des actualités (voice)
- Cher frangin (1989) - M. Durand, le patron d'Alain
- Le crime d'Antoine (1989) - Pilou
- Le bal des casse-pieds (1992) - (uncredited)
- Les eaux dormantes (1992) - Le père (voice)
- La Crise (1992) - M. Barelle
- Montparnasse-Pondichéry (1994) - Léo
- Le nez au vent (1995) - Paphaël
- Sortez des rangs (1996) - Le marchand de marrons (uncredited)
- Disparus (1998) - Blaise (âgé)

Producer

- The Little Wheedlers (1978) French: Les petits câlins
- The Crying Woman (1979) French: La Femme qui pleure

== Reissues and remakes ==
His black and white adaptation of the book La Guerre des Boutons having sold nearly 10 million tickets at the French box office in 1962, was hugely popular, and planned for a nationwide reissue 12 October 2011.

Some films were also re-made in Hollywood. The Tall Blond Man with One Black Shoe (1972), a spy spoof featuring the physical comedic skills of Pierre Richard, became The Man with One Red Shoe (1985) with Tom Hanks. Pardon Mon Affaire (1976), a sexy farce with Jean Rochefort, became The Woman in Red (1984).

== DVD releases ==
- La Gloire de Mon Pere + Le Chateau de Ma Mere (Restored) 1990–1991 2002, 2005 & 2012 Blu-ray
- The Tall Blond Man with One Black Shoe + The Return of the Tall Blond Man 1972, 1974
- Ni vu..., ni connu... (1958) 2009

== Bibliography ==
- Yves Robert. Un homme de joie. Dialogue avec Jérôme Tonnerre, Paris, Flammarion, 1996, 394 p. (ISBN 2-08-067240-1)
