= Crimson Curtain (1952 film) =

1952 film

- Directed by: André Barsacq
- Written by: Jean Anouilh; André Barsacq
- Produced by: François Chavane
- Starring: Michel Simon; Pierre Brasseur; Jean Brochard
- Cinematography: Maurice Barry
- Edited by: Jean Feyte
- Music by: Joseph Kosma
- Production company: Gaumont
- Distributed by: Gaumont Distribution
- Release date: 14 November 1952
- Running time: 84 minutes
- Country: France
- Language: French

Crimson Curtain (French: Le rideau rouge) is a 1952 French crime drama film directed by André Barsacq and starring Michel Simon, Pierre Brasseur and Jean Brochard. It was made at the Saint-Maurice Studios in Paris, with scenes also shot on location at the Théâtre de l'Atelier. The film's sets were designed by the art director Jean-Denis Malclès.

== Synopsis ==
Shortly before a theatrical production of Shakespeare's Macbeth is to take place, the tyrannical director Bertal is murdered. Suspicion falls on his various cast members, all of whose actions seem to resemble those of the characters they are playing in the production.

== Cast ==
- Michel Simon as Bertal / Banquo
- Pierre Brasseur as Ludovic Arn / Macbeth
- Monelle Valentin as Aurélia Nobli / Lady Macbeth
- Jean Brochard as L'inspecteur en chef
- Olivier Hussenot as L'inspecteur-adjoint
- Paul Barge as Le bistro
- Michel Barsacq
- Edmond Beauchamp as Un acteur
- Lucien Blondeau
- Louis Bugette
- Daniel Cauchy as Léon
- Gérard Darrieu as Un machiniste au théâtre
- Jacques Denoël
- Jacques Dufilho as Un acteur / An actor
- Michel Etcheverry as Un acteur
- Henri Gaultier
- Madeleine Geoffroy
- Gabriel Gobin
- Françoise Goléa
- Pierre Goutas
- Michel Herbault
- Katherine Kath
- Benoîte Labb
- Paul Laurent
- Robert Le Béal
- Serge Lecointe
- Robert Le Fort
- Robert Lombard
- François Marié
- Paul Mathos
- Geneviève Morel as Pierrette - l'habilleuse
- Jean Moulinot
- Hubert Noël
- André Numès Fils
- Marcel Pérès as Le machiniste qui fait du vent
- Jacques Rispal
- Christian Simon
- Georgette Talazac
- Catherine Toth
- André Versini as Un journaliste de la radio
- Noël Roquevert as Sigurd
- Charles Bouillaud as Le policier au commissariat
- Rudy Lenoir as Petit rôle
- Françoise Soulié as La jeune fille sur le banc

== Bibliography ==
- James Monaco. The Encyclopedia of Film. Perigee Books, 1991.
