= Now Where Did the 7th Company Get to? =

Now Where Did the 7th Company Get To?
- Directed by: Robert Lamoureux
- Written by: Robert Lamoureux
- Produced by: Alain Poiré
- Starring: Pierre Mondy; Jean Lefebvre; Aldo Maccione; Erik Colin; Robert Lamoureux
- Cinematography: Marcel Grignon
- Edited by: Gérard Pollicand
- Music by: Henri Bourtayre
- Distributed by: Gaumont Distribution
- Release date: 13 December 1973 (France)
- Running time: 95 minutes
- Countries: France; Italy

Now Where Did the 7th Company Get To? (French: Mais où est donc passée la septième compagnie?) is a 1973 French-Italian comedy war film directed by Robert Lamoureux. The film portrays the adventures of a French Army squad lost somewhere on the front in May 1940 during the Battle of France. A sequel, The Seventh Company Has Been Found was released in 1975.

== Plot ==
During the Battle of France, while German forces are spreading across the country, the 7th Transmission Company suffers an air raid near the Machecoul woods, but escape and hide in the woods. Captain Dumont, the company commander, send Louis Chaudard, Pithiviers and Tassin to scout the area. After burying the radio cable beneath a sandy road, the squad crosses the field, climbs a nearby hill, and takes position within a cemetery. One man cut down the wrong tree for camouflage, pulling up the radio cable and revealing it to the passing German infantry. The Germans cut the cable, surround the woods, and order a puzzled 7th Company to surrender. The squad tries to contact the company, but then witness their capture and run away.

Commanded by Staff Sergeant Chaudard, the unit stops in a wood for the night. Pithiviers is content to slow down and wait for the german infantry leave the place. The next day, he swims in the lake, in sight of possible German fighters. When Chaudard and Tassin wake up, they leave the camp without weapons to look for Pithiviers. Tassin finds him and gives an angry warning, but Pithiviers convinces Tassin to join him in the lake. Chaudard orders them to get out, but distracted by a rabbit, he falls into the lake with his clothes on. While Chaudard teaches his men how to swim, two German fighter planes appear, forcing them out of the water. After shooting down one of the German planes, a French pilot, Lieutenant Duvauchel, makes an emergency landing and escapes before his plane explodes. PFC Pithiviers, seeing the bad shape of one of his shoes, destroys what is left of his shoe sole. Tassin is sent on patrol to get food and a new pair of shoes for Pithiviers. Tassin arrives in a farm, but only finds a dog, so he returns and Chaudard goes to the farm after nightfall. The farmer returns with her daughter-in-law and Lt Duvauchel, and she welcomes Chaudard. Duvauchel, hiding behind the door, comes out upon hearing the news and decides to meet Chaudard's men.

When Chaudard and Duvauchel return to the camp, Tassin and Pithiviers are roasting a rabbit they caught. Duvauchel realizes that Chaudard has been lying and takes command.

The following day, the men leave the wood in early morning and capture a German armored tow truck after killing its two drivers. They originally planned to abandon the truck and the two dead Germans in the woods, but instead realized that the truck is the best way to disguise themselves and free the 7th Company. They put on the Germans' uniforms, recover another soldier of the 7th Company, who succeeded in escaping, and obtain resources from a collaborator who mistook them for Germans.

On their way, they encounter a National Gendarmerie patrol, who appear to be a 5th column. The patrol injures the newest member of their group, a young soldier, and then are killed by Tassin. In revenge, they destroy a German tank using the tow truck's cannon gun.

They planned to go to Paris but are misguided by their own colonel, but find the 7th Company with guards who are bringing them to Germany. Using their cover, they make the guards run in front of the truck, allowing the company to get away. Chaudard, Tassin, and Pithiviers in the truck, salute the German commander with a great smile.

Four years later, in June 1944, in a plane flown by lieutenant Duvauchel, Chaudard, Tassin and Pithiviers are parachuted in France. They prematurely fall from the plane, Pithiviers slipping, yet again.

== Casting ==
- Jean Lefebvre as PFC Pithiviers
- Pierre Mondy as Staff Sergent Paul Chaudard
- Aldo Maccione as PFC Tassin
- Robert Lamoureux as Colonel Blanchet
- Erik Colin as Lieutenant Duvauchel
- Pierre Tornade as Captain Dumont
- Alain Doutey as Carlier
- Robert Dalban as The peasant
- Jacques Marin as The collaborationist
- Robert Rollis as A French soldier

== Production ==
- The film's success spawned two sequels:

– 1975 : On a retrouvé la septième compagnie (The Seventh Company Has Been Found) by Robert Lamoureux;
– 1977 : La Septième Compagnie au clair de lune (The Seventh Company Outdoors)) by Robert Lamoureux.

- The story is set in Machecoul woods, but it was actually filmed near Cerny and La Ferté-Alais, as well as Jouars-Pontchartrain and Rochefort-en-Yvelines. The famous grocery scene was filmed in Bazoches-Sur-Guyonne.
- Robert Lamoureux based this film on his own personal experiences in June 1940 during the war.
- The final scene with the parachute is based on a true story. The 58 Free French paratroopers were parachuted into Brittany in groups of three, on the night of 7 June 1944 to neutralize the rail network of Normandy Landings in Brittany, two days before.

== Box office ==
The movie received a great success in France reaching the third best selling movie in 1974.
