= Special Mission (1946 film) =

1946 film

- Directed by: Maurice de Canonge
- Written by: Simon Gantillon
- Produced by: J.H. Moreau
- Starring: Jany Holt; Pierre Renoir; Jean Davy
- Cinematography: Georges Million
- Edited by: Monique Kirsanoff
- Music by: Jacques Dupont
- Production company: C.F.D.F.
- Distributed by: C.F.D.F.
- Release date: 8 March 1946
- Running time: 183 minutes; Part I (95 minutes); Part II (88 minutes)
- Country: France
- Language: French

Special Mission (French: Mission spéciale) is a 1946 French thriller film directed by Maurice de Canonge and starring Jany Holt, Pierre Renoir and Jean Davy. The film's art direction was by Claude Bouxin. It was released in two parts.

== Cast ==
- Jany Holt as Emmy de Welder - une espionne au service des Allemands
- Pierre Renoir as Landberg alias Moravetz - le chef du réseau d'espionnage allemand
- Jean Davy as Le commissaire Chabrier - un policier de la Surveillance du Territoire
- Odette Barencey as Une concierge
- Camille Bert
- Roger Bontemps
- Yves Brainville as Le gestionnaire
- André Carnège as Le contrôleur général
- Gregori Chmara
- Raymond Cordy as Mérignac - un policier de l'équipe de Chabrier
- Marcel Delaître as Le colonel Kleider
- Maurice Devienne
- Jacques Dubois
- Ky Duyen as Chang - un agent de liaison japonais
- France Ellys
- Fernand Fabre
- Guy Favières
- Geno Ferny
- Georges Flateau
- Louis Florencie as Le chef de gare bègue
- Jean Francel
- Alain Gilbert as Le tuberculeux
- Jean Giltène
- Jérôme Goulven as Staub
- René Hell
- Jacques Henley
- Jean Heuzé
- Gaëtan Jor
- Roger Karl as Roeckel alias Poldermann - un membre du réseau d'espionnage allemand
- Maurice Lagrenée
- Léo Lapara as Péroni
- Jacques Lecour
- Rudy Lenoir
- Maurice Marceau
- Germaine Michel
- Clary Monthal
- Armand Morins
- Nathalie Nattier as Wanda Vanska
- Georges Paulais
- Roger Rafal
- Raymone as Mademoiselle Cartier
- François Richard
- Jean-Jacques Rouff
- Jacques Roussel as Carlos
- Marcel Rouzé
- Elisa Ruis as Irma
- Maurice Salabert
- Robert Seller as Le directeur du 'Critérion'
- Liliane Valais as Hélène de Moreuil - la fille d'un colonel, infirmière et résistante
- Jean Vilmont
- Janine Viénot
- Marcelle Worms
- Yvonne Yma
- Jean Yonnel as Jean Sartène - un industriel du pétrole patriote
- Eugène Yvernès

== Bibliography ==
- Ulrike Siehlohr. Heroines Without Heroes: Reconstructing Female and National Identities in European Cinema, 1945-1951. A&C Black, 2000.
