= Maurice Marceau =

- Born: 22 April 1905; Paris, France
- Died: 10 January 1979 (aged 73); Clamart, France
- Occupation: Actor
- Years active: 1934-1952 (film)

Maurice Marceau (1905-1979) was a French film actor. A character actor he appeared in a number of small or supporting roles during the 1930s, 1940s and early 1950s.

== Selected filmography ==
- Moscow Nights (1934)
- A Rare Bird (1935)
- The Assault (1936)
- La Bête Humaine (1938)
- The Fatted Calf (1939)
- Three Artillerymen at the Opera (1938)
- Three from St Cyr (1939)
- The Rules of the Game (1939)
- The Emigrant (1940)
- Premier rendez-vous (1941)
- Mademoiselle Swing (1942)
- Fantastic Night (1942)
- The Honourable Catherine (1943)
- Shop Girls of Paris (1943)
- It Happened at the Inn (1943)
- The Ideal Couple (1946)
- Messieurs Ludovic (1946)
- The Angel They Gave Me (1946)
- Special Mission (1946)
- The Lost Village (1947)
- Monsieur Vincent (1947)
- Without Leaving an Address (1951)
- My Wife, My Cow and Me (1952)

== Bibliography ==
- Valérie Vignaux. Jacques Becker, ou, L'exercice de la liberté. Editions du CEFAL, 2000.
