= Hail the Artist =

1973 film

- French poster
- Directed by: Yves Robert
- Written by: Jean-Loup Dabadie; Yves Robert
- Starring: Marcello Mastroianni
- Cinematography: Jean Penzer
- Edited by: Ghislaine Desjonquères
- Music by: Vladimir Cosma
- Distributed by: Gaumont Distribution
- Release date: 6 December 1973
- Running time: 96 minutes
- Countries: France; Italy
- Language: French
- Box office: $4.3 million

Hail the Artist (French: Salut l'artiste, Italian: L'idolo della città) is a 1973 French-Italian comedy film directed by Yves Robert.

== Cast ==
- Marcello Mastroianni as Nicolas Montei
- Françoise Fabian as Peggy
- Jean Rochefort as Clément
- Carla Gravina as Elisabeth Montei
- Evelyne Buyle as Bérénice
- Henri-Jacques Huet as The director
- Lise Delamare as Lady Rosemond
- Sylvie Joly as The photographer's wife
- Hélène Vallier as The script
- Simone Paris as The theater director
- Maurice Barrier as Al Capone
- Dominique De Keuchel as Rodrigue
- Gérard Jugnot as The camera operator (uncredited)
- Bernadette Robert
- Betty Beckers
- Claire Nadeau
- Lucienne Legrand
- Elizabeth Teissier (as Elisabeth Teissier)
