= Land Without Stars =

- Directed by: Georges Lacombe
- Written by: Georges Lacombe; Pierre Véry (novel)
- Produced by: Camille Trachimel
- Starring: Jany Holt; Pierre Brasseur; Gérard Philipe
- Cinematography: Louis Page
- Edited by: Raymond Lamy
- Music by: Marcel Mirouze
- Production company: Société Parisienne de Cinéma
- Distributed by: Les Films Vog
- Release date: 3 April 1946
- Running time: 100 minutes
- Country: France
- Language: French
- Box office: 561,428 admissions (France)

Land Without Stars (French: Le pays sans étoiles) is a 1946 French romantic drama film directed by Georges Lacombe and starring Jany Holt, Pierre Brasseur and Gérard Philipe.

The film's sets were designed by the art director Robert Gys.

== Main cast ==
- Jany Holt as Catherine Le Quellec / Aurélia Talacayud
- Pierre Brasseur as Jean-Thomas Pellerin / François-Charles Talacayud
- Gérard Philipe as Simon Legouge / Frédéric Talacayud
- Marthe Mellot as Anaïs Talacayud
- Jane Marken as La secrétaire
- Guy Favières as Joachim - le père d'Aurélia
- Hélène Tossy as Bérengère
- Edmond Castel as Le cousin
- Paul Demange as Le premier clerc de notaire
- Odette Barencey as Une amie d'Anaïs

== Bibliography ==
- Rège, Philippe. Encyclopedia of French Film Directors, Volume 1. Scarecrow Press, 2009.
