= The Pink Telephone =

1975 film

- Directed by: Édouard Molinaro
- Written by: Francis Veber
- Produced by: Alain Poiré
- Starring: Mireille Darc; Pierre Mondy; Michael Lonsdale
- Cinematography: Gérard Hameline
- Edited by: Monique Isnardon; Robert Isnardon
- Music by: Vladimir Cosma
- Production companies: Gaumont International; Productions 2000
- Distributed by: Gaumont Distribution
- Release date: 15 October 1975
- Running time: 95 minutes
- Country: France
- Language: French

The Pink Telephone (French: Le téléphone rose) is a 1975 French romantic comedy drama film directed by Édouard Molinaro and starring Mireille Darc, Pierre Mondy and Michael Lonsdale. It was shot at the Billancourt Studios in Paris. The film's sets were designed by the art director François de Lamothe.

== Cast ==
- Mireille Darc as Christine
- Pierre Mondy as Benoît Castejac
- Michael Lonsdale as Morrison
- Françoise Prévost as Françoise Castejac
- Daniel Ceccaldi as Levêgue
- Gérard Hérold as Delorme
- Robert Dalban as Lartigue - le comptable
- Robert Lombard as Christine's 1st client
- Pierre Maguelon as Le patron de la brasserie
- Louis Navarre as Waiter
- André Valardy as René Bastide
- Lucienne Legrand as La secrétaire de Levêgue

== Bibliography ==
- Rège, Philippe. Encyclopedia of French Film Directors, Volume 1. Scarecrow Press, 2009.
