= Life Belongs to Us =

1936 documentary film

- Directed by: Jacques Becker; Jacques B. Brunius; Henri Cartier-Bresson; Jean-Paul Le Chanois; Maurice Lime; Jean Renoir; Pierre Unik; André Zwoboda
- Written by: Jacques Becker; Jacques B. Brunius; Jean Renoir; Pierre Unik
- Starring: Brunius; Pierre Unik; Max d'Alban; Fabien Loris; Teddy Michaux; Sylvain Itkine; Roger Blin; Guy Favières
- Edited by: Jacques B. Brunius; Marguerite Renoir
- Music by: Hanns Eisler; Eugène Pottier; Dmitri Shostakovich
- Release date: 1936
- Running time: 66 minutes
- Country: France
- Language: French

Life Belongs to Us (French: La vie est à nous) is a 1936 docufiction propaganda film commissioned and produced by the Communist Party of France with the participation, among others, of Jean Renoir. Parts of the film were taken from newsreels, and are mixed with new sketches about working people, peasants, and intellectuals.

It analyzes the power of the "200 families" who ran France at the time.
