= Magali Vendeuil =

French actress (1926–2009

- Born: 18 September 1926; La Vernarède, Gard, France
- Died: 12 January 2009 (aged 82); Paris, France
- Occupation: Actress
- Years active: 1952–1996
- Spouse: Robert Lamoureux

Magali Vendeuil (18 September 1926 – 12 January 2009) was a French stage and film actress who also appeared in television productions. She was a member of the Comédie-Française between 1950 and 1961. She played the female lead in several films including the 1955 thriller More Whiskey for Callaghan. She was married to fellow actor Robert Lamoureux.

== Selected filmography ==
- Drôle de noce (1952)
- Procès au Vatican (1952)
- Trial at the Vatican (1952)
- Beauties of the Night (1952)
- More Whiskey for Callaghan (1955)
- Une fille épatante (1955)
- Jugez-les bien (1961)
- Impossible Is Not French (1974)

== Bibliography ==
- Goble, Alan. The Complete Index to Literary Sources in Film. Walter de Gruyter, 1999.
- Hayward, Susan. French Costume Drama of the 1950s: Fashioning Politics in Film. Intellect Books, 2010.
