= Beauties of the Night (1952 film) =

1952 film by René Clair

Beauties of the Nights
- Movie poster
- Directed by: René Clair
- Written by: René Clair; Adaptation: Pierre Barillet; Jean-Pierre Gredy
- Produced by: René Clair; Angelo Rizzoli
- Starring: Gérard Philipe; Martine Carol; Gina Lollobrigida; Magali Vendeuil
- Cinematography: Armand Thirard
- Edited by: Louisette Hautecoeur; Denise Natot
- Music by: Georges Van Parys
- Production companies: Franco London Films; Rizzoli Film
- Distributed by: Gaumont Distribution (France)
- Release dates: 14 November 1952 (France); April 1954 (USA)
- Running time: 87 minutes
- Countries: France; Italy
- Language: French
- Box office: 3,499,199 admissions (France)

Beauties of the Night (French: Les Belles de nuit) is a 1952 French-Italian fantasy comedy film directed and written by René Clair who co-produced with Angelo Rizzoli. The film stars Gérard Philipe, Martine Carol, Gina Lollobrigida and Magali Vendeuil. It was nominated the Venice Film Festival for Golden Lion (René Clair). It was shot at Boulogne Studios in Paris.

== Plot ==
Impoverished piano teacher and composer Claude (Gérard Philipe) fantasizes about seducing beautiful rich women. One night a promising dream turns into a nightmare in which he's chased by the violent husbands and brothers of his lovers. He gets up and tries to stay awake for fear of feeling haunted again. Then he meets his neighbour Suzanne (Magali Vendeuil) who resembles a woman from his dream.

== Cast ==
- Gérard Philipe as Claude
- Martine Carol as Edmee
- Gina Lollobrigida as Leila / Cashier
- Magali Vendeuil as Suzanne
- Marilyn Buferd as Madame Bonacieux / Postal clerk
- Raymond Bussières as Roger the mechanic
- Raymond Cordy as Suzanne's father Gaston / Marquis
- Bernard La Jarrige as Léon, le gendarme / Leon the gendarme
- Albert Michel as Le facteur / Postman
- Palau as The Old Gentleman
- Jean Parédès as Paul the pharmacist
- Paolo Stoppa as Opera director
