= Rue de l'Estrapade (film) =

- Directed by: Jacques Becker
- Written by: Annette Wademant
- Produced by: François Chavane
- Starring: Louis Jourdan; Anne Vernon; Daniel Gélin; Micheline Dax; Jean Servais; Michel Flamme; Pâquerette
- Cinematography: Marcel Grignon
- Edited by: Marguerite Renoir
- Music by: Marguerite Monnot; Georges Van Parys
- Distributed by: Cinédis
- Release date: April 1953
- Running time: 100 minutes
- Country: France
- Language: French

Rue de l'Estrapade is a 1953 French film.
