= Papa, Mama, the Maid and I =

1954 film

- Directed by: Jean-Paul Le Chanois
- Written by: Marcel Aymé; Pierre Véry
- Produced by: Jules Borkon (executive producer)
- Starring: Robert Lamoureux; Louis de Funès
- Cinematography: Marc Fossard
- Edited by: Emma Le Chanois
- Music by: Georges Van Parys
- Color process: Black and white
- Production companies: Champs-Élysées Productions; Cocinex; Lambor Films
- Distributed by: Cocinor
- Release date: 26 November 1954
- Running time: 101 minutes
- Country: France
- Language: French

Papa, Mama, the Maid and I (French: Papa, maman, la bonne et moi) is a French comedy film from 1954, directed by Jean-Paul Le Chanois, written by Marcel Aymé, starring Robert Lamoureux and Louis de Funès.

== Cast ==
- Robert Lamoureux as Robert Langlois, the son, future lawyer
- Gaby Morlay as Gabrielle Langlois, mother
- Fernand Ledoux as Fernand Langlois, father
- Nicole Courcel as Catherine Liseray, future spouse of Robert
- Madeleine Barbulée as Marie-Louise
- Louis de Funès as Mr Calomel, the neighbouring handyman
- Yolande Laffon as Madeleine Sautopin, friend of Mum
- Robert Rollis as Léon « alibi », campaign of Robert
- Sophie Sel as Mss Leconte, a pupil
- Dominique Davray as the butcher
- Françoise Hornez as Nicole, a neighbour
- Judith Magre as German, an employee of the office of mister Turpin
- Hubert Deschamps as the spectator who did not have dinner
- Léon Arvelas parent
- Claude Castaing

== See also ==
- Papa, maman, ma femme et moi - sequel
