= Nagana (1955 film) =

1955 film

- Directed by: Hervé Bromberger
- Written by: Jacques Berland; Hervé Bromberger; Jacques Companéez; Louis Martin
- Produced by: Albert Caraco
- Starring: Barbara Laage; Renato Baldini; Gabrielle Dorziat
- Cinematography: Edmond Séchan
- Edited by: Roger Dwyre
- Music by: Georges Auric
- Production companies: Cinefilms; Gamma Film; Italgamma
- Distributed by: Gamma Film
- Release date: 14 June 1955
- Running time: 92 minutes
- Countries: France; Italy
- Language: French

Nagana is a 1955 French-Italian adventure film directed by Hervé Bromberger and starring Barbara Laage, Renato Baldini and Gabrielle Dorziat. The film's sets were designed by the art director Paul Bertrand.

== Cast ==
- Barbara Laage as Geneviève Larguillière
- Renato Baldini as Maurice Leblond
- Gabrielle Dorziat as Mme Larguillière
- Gil Delamare as Paulo Mangani
- Raymond Souplex as Charlier
- Pierre Sergeol
- Enrico Luzi

== Bibliography ==
- Rège, Philippe. Encyclopedia of French Film Directors, Volume 1. Scarecrow Press, 2009.
- Roust, Colin Thomas. Sounding French: The Film Music and Criticism of Georges Auric, 1919-1945. University of Michigan., 2007.
