= Three Artillerymen at the Opera =

- Directed by: André Chotin
- Written by: André Chotin; Roger Ferdinand; André Haguet
- Starring: Pierre Larquey; Roland Toutain; Paul Azaïs
- Cinematography: Scarciafico Hugo; Georges Raulet
- Music by: Jane Bos
- Production company: Films de Koster
- Distributed by: Pellegrin Cinéma
- Release date: 10 May 1939
- Country: France
- Language: French

Three Artillerymen at the Opera (French: Trois artilleurs à l'opéra) is a 1938 French comedy film directed by André Chotin and starring Pierre Larquey, Roland Toutain and Paul Azaïs.

The film's sets were designed by the art director René Renoux.

== Cast ==
- Pierre Larquey as Zéphitard
- Roland Toutain as Jacques Dancourt
- Paul Azaïs as Billardon
- Louis Baron fils as Badaquin
- Georges Bever as Le brigadier
- Marcel Carpentier as Ducouret
- Marguerite de Morlaye as La vieille dame
- Irène de Trebert as Nicole Ducouret
- Paul Demange as Le greffier
- François Dupriet
- Maxime Fabert as Un soldat
- Zizi Festerat
- Philippe Grall as Un soldat
- Denise Grey as Paulette
- Albert Malbert as Le brigadier de police
- Maurice Marceau as Un soldat
- Frédéric Mariotti as Le chauffeur
- Milly Mathis as La patronne de l'hôtel
- Palau as L'adjudant
- Rittche
- Betty Stresa
- Marguerite Templey as Madame Ducouret

== Bibliography ==
- Rège, Philippe. Encyclopedia of French Film Directors, Volume 1. Scarecrow Press, 2009.
