= Max Dalban =

French actor

- Born: 27 May 1908
- Died: 9 February 1958 (aged 49)
- Occupation: Actor
- Years active: 1928–1958

Max Dalban (27 May 1908 – 9 February 1958) was a French film actor.

== Selected filmography ==
- Boudu Saved from Drowning (1932)
- Chotard and Company (1933)
- Street Without a Name (1934)
- Toni (1935)
- The Mutiny of the Elsinore (1936)
- The Alibi (1937)
- Sirocco (1938)
- Vidocq (1939)
- Secrets (1943)
- The Ménard Collection (1944)
- The Ideal Couple (1946)
- Lessons in Conduct (1946)
- Panic (Panique) (1947)
- Clochemerle (1948)
- Maya (1949)
- The Sinners (1949)
- Street Without a King (1950)
- Véronique (1950)
- My Wife Is Formidable (1951)
- Two Pennies Worth of Violets (1951)
- Piédalu in Paris (1951)
- Judgement of God (1952)
- It Happened in Paris (1952)
- Piédalu Works Miracles (1952)
- The Slave (1953)
- Double or Quits (1953)
- Sins of Paris (1953)
- Leguignon the Healer (1954)
- I'll Get Back to Kandara (1956)
- It's All Adam's Fault (1958)

== Bibliography ==
- Nicholas Macdonald. In Search of La Grande Illusion: A Critical Appreciation of Jean Renoir's Elusive Masterpiece. McFarland, 2013.
