= Yolande Laffon =

French actress (1895–1992)

- Born: Yolande Lamy; 24 August 1895; Paris, France
- Died: 15 December 1992 (aged 97); Louveciennes, Yvelines, France
- Other name: Yolande Chamoux
- Occupation: Actress
- Years active: 1930-1956 (film)

Yolande Laffon (1895–1992) was a French stage and film actress.

== Selected filmography ==
- Love Songs (1930)
- Suzanne (1932)
- Mayerling (1936)
- Beethoven's Great Love (1937)
- The City of Lights (1938)
- The Mysteries of Paris (1943)
- The Misfortunes of Sophie (1946)
- Dilemma of Two Angels (1948)
- Gigi (1949)
- Two Pennies Worth of Violets (1951)
- Young Love (1951)
- Matrimonial Agency (1952)
- Leathernose (1952)
- The Respectful Prostitute (1952)
- Papa, maman, la bonne et moi (1954)
- Zoé (1954)
- Blood to the Head (1956)

== Bibliography ==
- Goble, Alan. The Complete Index to Literary Sources in Film. Walter de Gruyter, 1999.
