= The Apprentice Heel =

1977 film

- Directed by: Michel Deville
- Written by: Michel Deville
- Starring: Robert Lamoureux
- Release date: 12 February 1977
- Running time: 98 minutes
- Country: France
- Language: French

The Apprentice Heel (French: L'Apprenti salaud) is a 1977 French comedy film directed by Michel Deville. It stars Robert Lamoureux.

== Cast ==
- Robert Lamoureux as Antoine Chapelot
- Christine Dejoux as Caroline Nattier
- Claude Piéplu as Etienne Forelon, le notaire de Briançon
- Jacques Doniol-Valcroze as L'adjoint au maire Forelon
- Jean-Pierre Kalfon as Robert Forelon, le directeur du journal
- Claude Marcault as La femme de l'adjoint
- Annick Blancheteau as La patronne de l'hôtel
- Jean-François Dérec as Joseph
- Bernard Lavalette as Roger Desmare
