= Boys' School =

- Directed by: Christian-Jaque
- Starring: Erich von Stroheim; Michel Simon; Robert Le Vigan; Marcel Mouloudji
- Cinematography: Marcel Lusien
- Music by: Henry Verdun
- Production company: Dimeco Productions
- Distributed by: Les Films Vog (France); Columbia Pictures (USA)
- Release dates: 6 April 1938 (France); 5 June 1939 (USA)
- Running time: 98 minutes
- Country: France
- Language: French

Boys' School (French: Les Disparus de Saint-Agil) is a 1938 French drama film by Christian-Jaque based on the novel of the same title by Pierre Véry. It has become a cult film.

== Plot ==
Shortly before the war, strange things happen at night at the School of Saint-Agil. Students begin to disappear... Three students of Saint-Agil, Beaume Sorgue and Macroy, have created a secret society to prepare leaving for America. One evening, one of them, Sorgue, sees a man through a wall in the natural sciences class. He then disappears after having been sent to the principal's office. When Macroy vanishes in turn, the whole institution is in turmoil. The last member of the secret society still at school, Beaume, might be expelled as well after the yearly school party. During this party, Lemel, the alcoholic art teacher, dies after a fall when a power outage leaves the school in the black. Everyone believes in an accident but Beaume decides to investigate. He chooses to disappear as well and, with the help of the mysterious and spooky English teacher, he manages to discover the counterfeiting business at work in the school insides.

== Cast ==
- Marcel Mouloudji as Philippe Macroy
- Jean Claudio as Mathieu Sorgue
- Erich von Stroheim as Walter, the English teacher
- Michel Simon as Lemel, the art teacher
- Robert Le Vigan as César, the counterfeiter
- Armand Bernard as Mazeau, the concierge
- Aimé Clariond as the school principal
- René Génin as Donnadieu, the music teacher
- Serge Reggiani as a schoolboy [uncredited]
- Charles Aznavour as a schoolboy [uncredited]
- Robert Rollis as a schoolboy
- Serge Grave as Beaume
- Jacques Derives as Planet
- Martial Rèbe as the dorm supervisor
- Pierre Labry as Bernardin
- Albert Malbert as Alexis, the miller
- Félix Claude as a schoolboy
- Jean Buquet as the snitch
- Claude Roy as the schoolboy with a turtle
- Robert Ozanne as a nurse
