= Jacques Becker =

French filmmaker (1906–1960)

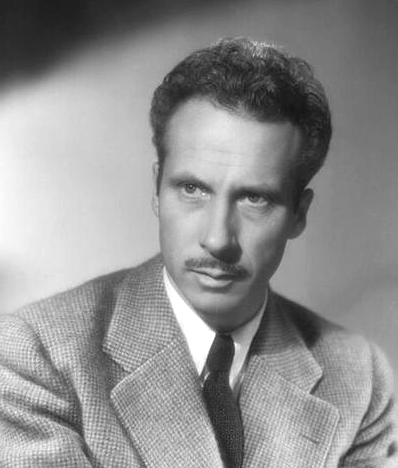
- Becker in 1955
- Born: 15 September 1906; Paris, France
- Died: 21 February 1960 (aged 53); Paris, France
- Occupations: Screenwriter; Film director
- Years active: 1931–1960
- Notable work: Casque d'or Touchez pas au grisbi Le Trou
- Spouses: Geneviève Boyard (1931–1954); Françoise Fabian (1957–1960)
- Children: 4, including Jean and Étienne

Jacques Becker (French: [bɛkɛʁ]; 15 September 1906 – 21 February 1960) was a French film director and screenwriter. His films, made during the 1940s and 1950s, encompassed a wide variety of genres, and they were admired by some of the filmmakers who led the French New Wave movement.

== Biography ==
Born in Paris, Becker was from an upper-middle-class background. His father Louis Becker, from Lorraine, was corporate director for Fulmen, a battery manufacturer; his mother, Margaret Burns, of Scottish and Irish descent, managed a fashion house in rue Cambon near Chanel in Paris. He was educated at the Lycées Condorcet and Carnot and then at the École Bréguet. Becker was reluctant to pursue a business career like his father and at the age of 18 he went to New York. On a transatlantic liner he met the film director King Vidor who offered him a job but Becker turned it down.

Back in France Becker developed a friendship with Jean Renoir, whom he had first met in 1921 through their mutual acquaintance with the Cézanne family, and they discovered a shared enthusiasm for sports cars and jazz music as well as films. In 1929, Becker took a small acting role in Renoir's film Le Bled, and he went on to become Renoir's assistant for nine of his films of the 1930s. He also made brief appearances in some of them, such as La Grande Illusion (in which he played an imprisoned English officer who smashes his watch rather than allow the Germans to have it).

Becker had his first chance of directing a film of his own in 1939 with L'Or du Cristobal, but it ran into difficulties and he left the production after three weeks. After the outbreak of WW2 and the German invasion of France, Becker was captured and spent a year in a prisoner-of-war camp in Pomerania before getting released. Returning to occupied France, he was able to make his proper first feature, Dernier Atout (1942), thanks to a friend who was setting up an independent production company. Some of the filming of Dernier Atout took place around Nice on the Côte d'Azur and Becker used the opportunity to establish links between an anti-Nazi group of filmmakers there and the Parisian Resistance. In 1943, he was one of the filmmakers who set up the Comité de libération du cinéma français to make preparations for the cinema after the war, and in the following year they organised filming of the uprising in Paris for the documentary La Libération de Paris. In the aftermath of the Liberation, Becker was among those who argued in support of Henri-Georges Clouzot and Robert Le Vigan when they were condemned for collaboration during the war.

Becker made two further films, of markedly different character, during the Occupation: Goupi Mains Rouges was a story of greed and murder in a remote French farming community, and Falbalas depicted the (more or less contemporary) world of the Parisian fashion business. After the war Becker made several films in comic vein which showed the everyday lives of young people in present-day Paris: Antoine et Antoinette (1947), Rendezvous de juillet (1949), Édouard et Caroline (1951), and Rue de l'Estrapade (1953). In the middle of these he made Casque d'or (1952), a tragic romance set during the Belle Époque and loosely based on a true story among the criminal gangs of the Parisian underworld. The film was not well received at its initial appearance, but following acclaim abroad it became one of Becker's most admired works.

Becker had a further success with Touchez pas au grisbi (1954) which relaunched the post-war career of Jean Gabin in the role of an aging gangster and introduced a distinctly French style of the gangster film which would become popular in the following years. Finding it nevertheless difficult to get financing for his projects, Becker next undertook a couple of commercial productions, Ali Baba et les quarante voleurs and Les Aventures d'Arsène Lupin, in which he found less scope to impose a personal touch (and the only two films he made in colour). In 1958, Becker took over the filming of Montparnasse 19 from Max Ophuls who died while preparing the project about the last years of the painter Modigliani, but because of its hybrid origins it remained a troubled production. In Le Trou (1960), which recounted in almost documentary fashion the planning of a prison escape (based on a real event of 1947), Becker was able to return to a more personal and rigorous style. It was Becker's final film and he died shortly before its release, which then brought some of the warmest acclaim of his career.

Becker was 53 when he died of lung cancer in February 1960, and he was interred in the Cimetière du Montparnasse in Paris. His children by his first marriage included Jean Becker, who also became a film director (and assisted his father on several of his later films), and Étienne Becker who was a cinematographer. In 1957, the actress Françoise Fabian became Becker's second wife.

== Reputation ==
Perhaps because his career as a director was relatively short (13 features completed before his early death) and because the variety of his subjects and genres makes him difficult to categorise, Becker's reputation has tended to be overshadowed by those French filmmakers who have fitted more easily into a critical narrative. He was however highly esteemed by many of his fellow filmmakers. Jean Renoir, who knew him first as a friend and then as his assistant, described him as "my brother and my son ... someone who was both lovable and ardent", and he singled out Casque d'or as "one of the masterpieces of the screen". Jean-Pierre Melville was another friend, who regarded Becker's support for his early films as being crucial in giving him the confidence to continue his own career as a filmmaker. He also described an example of Becker's perfectionism when he used Melville's studio to re-shoot scenes for Le Trou, repeating multiple takes before he felt satisfied that it was as good as it could be. Melville regarded Le Trou as one of the greatest films.

For the critic-directors of the New Wave in the 1950s, Becker was one of a select group of French filmmakers whom they excluded from a moribund "tradition of quality" and regarded as auteurs, genuine creators of their own films who often wrote their own screenplays as well as directing. Jacques Rivette worked as Becker's assistant in 1954 on Ali Baba et les quarante voleurs. Jean-Luc Godard referred to Becker as "Frère Jacques". François Truffaut wrote often about Becker, and in an admiring review of Touchez pas au grisbi he argued that Becker's films stood apart from all theories and styles and were very much his own. They were notable less for their subjects or plots than for their economical, pared-down treatment and their explorations of character; "his work is a perpetual challenge to vulgarity, and it is a gamble Becker invariably wins, for his films are alway elegant and dignified".

Later assessments have taken up a number of these observations. Several critics have emphasised his attention to details, not only to create atmosphere but as a key to exploration of the characters who are linked to them. The prioritisation of character over plot is another recurrent feature which has been noted, especially in Becker's willingness to depart from the main thrust of the narrative to follow seemingly inessential moments in the lives of his characters through which they become more deeply embedded in their context.

The frequent observations that Becker's films are difficult to classify, because they are so varied in style and genre, are supported by a remark that Becker made about himself in an interview: he said that he had been haunted by the notion of being 'pigeon-holed', and this was something he had long paid attention to in his choice of work. Becker also expressed his ideas about film authorship in an article published in 1947, in which he argued that directors should work on their own screenplays and make their films personal. This was some years before proponents of the New Wave expressed similar principles.

The judgment that Becker's films can be seen as both classic and modern reflects the fact that he himself learned his craft as Jean Renoir's assistant on some of the great films of the 1930s and he went on to become an inspiration to some of the younger filmmakers of the 1950s and 1960s, while his own films often drew intimate portraits of his own times in the years between.

== Filmography ==
=== Director ===
Year	Title	English title	Notes
1935	Tête de turc		Medium-length film (42 mins)
1935	Le Commissaire est bon enfant, le gendarme est sans pitié		Medium-length film (40 mins)
1940	L'Or du Cristobal	Cristobal's Gold	Becker left the film, which was completed by Jean Stelli
1942	Dernier Atout	The Trump Card	
1943	Goupi Mains Rouges	It Happened at the Inn	
1945	Falbalas	Paris Frills	
1947	Antoine et Antoinette	Antoine and Antoinette	
1949	Rendez-vous de juillet	Rendezvous in July	
1951	Édouard et Caroline	Edward and Caroline	
1952	Casque d'or	Casque d'or / Golden Marie	
1953	Rue de l'Estrapade	Rue de l'Estrapade / Françoise Steps Out	
1954	Touchez pas au grisbi	Touchez pas au grisbi / Grisbi / Honour Among Thieves	
1954	Ali Baba et les Quarante Voleurs	Ali Baba and the Forty Thieves	
1957	Les Aventures d'Arsène Lupin	The Adventures of Arsène Lupin	
1958	Montparnasse 19 / Les Amants de Montparnasse	Montparnasse 19 / The Lovers of Montparnasse	Becker took over the film from Max Ophüls who died while preparing the project
1960	Le Trou	Le Trou / The Night Watch / The Hole	

=== Assistant director ===
Year	Title	English title	Directed by	Notes
1931	Y'en a pas deux comme Angélique		Roger Lion	
1931	Allô... Allô...		Roger Lion	Short
1932	La Nuit du carrefour	Night at the Crossroads	Jean Renoir	
1932	Boudu sauvé des eaux	Boudu Saved from Drowning	Jean Renoir	
1933	Chotard et Cie	Chotard and Company	Jean Renoir	
1933	Madame Bovary	Madame Bovary	Jean Renoir	Uncredited
1936	La vie est à nous	Life Belongs to Us	Jean Renoir & collective	Becker directed one short sequence of this anthology film and was an assistant director
1936	Les Bas-fonds	The Lower Depths	Jean Renoir	
1937	La Grande Illusion	Grand Illusion	Jean Renoir	
1938	La Marseillaise	La Marseillaise	Jean Renoir	
1940	L'Héritier de Mondésir	The Mondesir Heir	Albert Valentin	
1946	Partie de campagne	A Day in the Country	Jean Renoir	Produced in 1936
