= Papa, maman, ma femme et moi =

1955 film

- Directed by: Jean-Paul Le Chanois
- Written by: Marcel Aymé; Pierre Véry
- Produced by: Lambor Films (France)
- Starring: Robert Lamoureux; Louis de Funès
- Music by: Georges Van Parys
- Distributed by: Cocinor
- Release date: 18 October 1955 (France)
- Running time: 105 minutes
- Country: France
- Language: French
- Box office: $28.4 million

Papa, maman, ma femme et moi French: Papa, Mama, My Woman and Me, is a French comedy film from 1955, directed by Jean-Paul Le Chanois, written by Marcel Aymé, starring Robert Lamoureux and Louis de Funès. The film is known under the titles: Papa, Mama, My Wife and Me (UK), Papa, Mama, My Woman and Me (International English title), Papà, mammà, mia moglie ed io (Italy), and Papa, Mama, meine Frau und ich (West Germany).

== Cast ==
- Robert Lamoureux as Robert Langlois, son, lawyer
- Gaby Morlay as Gabrielle Langlois, mother
- Fernand Ledoux as Fernand Langlois, father
- Nicole Courcel as Catherine Langlois, wife of Robert
- Elina Labourdette as Marguerite, the florist
- Jean Tissier as Mr. Petitot, former lawyer, property adviser
- Robert Rollis as Léon "Alibi", Robert's friend
- Louis de Funès as Mr. Calomel, neighbour of the Langlois family
- Renée Passeur as the lady visiting the apartment
- Luc Andrieux as the removal man
- Mylène Demongeot as The woman at the door

== See also ==
- Papa, Mama, the Maid and I (1954)
