= Piédalu in Paris =

1951 film

- Directed by: Jean Loubignac
- Written by: Jean Loubignac; Ded Rysel
- Produced by: Emil Flavin
- Starring: Félix Oudart; Nathalie Nattier; Armand Bernard
- Cinematography: René Colas
- Edited by: Jacques Mavel
- Music by: Henri Bourtayre
- Production company: Optimax Films
- Distributed by: Lux Compagnie Cinématographique de France
- Release date: 12 October 1951
- Running time: 110 minutes
- Country: France
- Language: French

Piédalu in Paris (French: Piédalu à Paris) is a 1951 French comedy film directed by Jean Loubignac and starring Félix Oudart, Nathalie Nattier and Armand Bernard. It was shot at the Photosonor Studios in Paris. The film's sets were designed by the art director Louis Le Barbenchon. It was one of a trilogy of films featuring the character Piédalu.

== Synopsis ==
Piédalu, a naive man from the countryside, travels to Paris in order to try and meet the Minister of National Renovation to submit plans for a new tax system to him. Instead he ends up in a music hall amidst a series of misunderstandings and has to return home without even seeing the government official. Fortuitously the minister has a car breakdown near Piédalu's village and he is at last able to meet him.

== Cast ==
- Ded Rysel as Piédalu
- Félix Oudart as Le ministre de la Rénovation Nationale
- Nathalie Nattier as Gloria Lamar
- Armand Bernard as M. Finnois
- Jane Sourza as Mlle. Isabelle
- Jacques Berlioz as Le général
- Borodine as Olivier
- Raymond Cordy as L'huissier-chef
- Max Dalban as Étienne
- René Génin as Le curé
- René Hell as Le notaire
- Jean Kolb as L'évêque
- Charles Lemontier as Le préfet
- Julien Maffre as Le brigadier
- Georges Paulais as L'instituteur
- Germaine Reuver as Mme. Piédalu
- Micheline Valmonde as Madeleine Baudoin

== Bibliography ==
- Bessy, Maurice & Chirat, Raymond. Histoire du cinéma français: 1951-1955. Pygmalion, 1989.
- Rège, Philippe. Encyclopedia of French Film Directors, Volume 1. Scarecrow Press, 2009.
