= Jean Loubignac =

- Born: Jean Alexandre Loubignac; 23 November 1901; Neuilly-sur-Seine
- Died: 4 March 1991 (aged 89); Romans-sur-Isère (Drôme)
- Occupation: Film director

Jean Alexandre Loubignac (23 November 1901 - 4 March 1991) was a French film director. A specialist of popular comedies, Jean Loubignac is well known for the film Ah! Les belles bacchantes which he directed in 1955, written and performed by Robert Dhéry and Francis Blanche.

== Filmography ==
Director

- 1938 : Sommes-nous défendus ?
- 1948 : Le voleur se porte bien
- 1948 : Le Barbier de Séville
- 1949 : Piège à hommes
- 1949 : The Martyr of Bougival
- 1950 : Piédalu voyage
- 1950 : Le Gang des tractions-arrière
- 1951 : Piédalu in Paris
- 1952 : Foyer perdu
- 1952 : Piédalu Works Miracles
- 1954 : Piédalu député
- 1954 : Ah! Les belles bacchantes
- 1956 : Coup dur chez les mous

Film editor

- 1938 : La France est un empire by Emmanuel Bourcier
- 1941 : The Master Valet by Paul Mesnier
