= Les hommes ne pensent qu'à ça =

- Directed by: Yves Robert
- Written by: Jean Bellanger
- Produced by: François Chavane; Yves Robert; Alain Poiré
- Starring: Jean-Marie Amato; Louis de Funès
- Cinematography: Paul Soulignac-Thomas
- Edited by: Raymond Lamy
- Music by: Georges Van Parys
- Production companies: Société Nouvelle des Etablissements Gaumont; Cinphonic
- Distributed by: Gaumont Distribution
- Release date: 14 June 1954 (France)
- Running time: 70 minutes
- Country: France
- Language: French

Les hommes ne pensent qu'à ça English: Men Think Only of That, is a French comedy film from 1954, directed by Yves Robert, written by Jean Bellanger, starring Jean-Marie Amato and Louis de Funès.

== Cast ==
- Jean-Marie Amato : Don Juan
- Jean Bellanger : Alfred, the timid lover
- Louisa Colpeyn : the Russian Countess
- Catherine Erard : Nicole, the cheese seller, who loves Alfred
- Jacques Fabbri : Monsieur Jacques, the butcher's boy
- Gabrielle Fontan : the old lady on the staircase
- Jacques Hilling : King Dagobert / a walker
- Geneviève Morel : the mother who marries her daughter off
- Jacques Morel : the perfect seducer
- Annie Noël : Poupette, a curator
- Guy Pierrault : Baron Haissmann / a republican / a walker
- Louis de Funès : Mr Célosso, the Spanish husband of the Russian Countess
- Yves Robert : the war veteran / a walker
