= Robert Le Vigan =

French actor

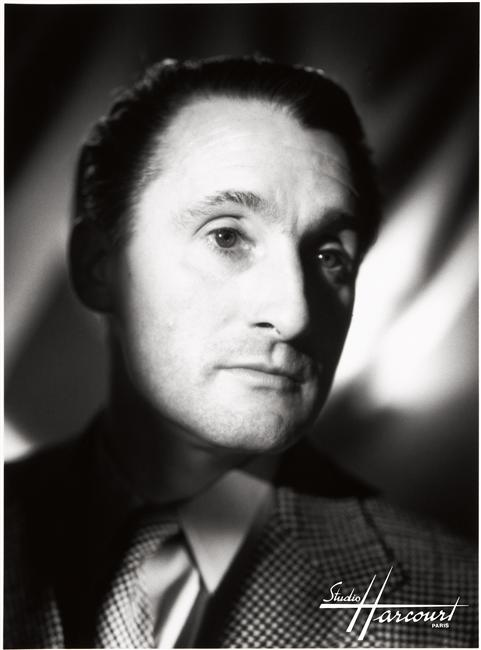
- Le Vigan in 1942
- Born: Robert Charles Alexandre Coquillaud; 7 January 1900; Paris, France
- Died: 12 October 1972 (aged 72); Tandil, Argentina
- Occupation: Actor
- Years active: 1919–1952

Robert Le Vigan (born Robert Coquillaud, 7 January 1900 – 12 October 1972) was a French actor.

He appeared in more than 60 films between 1931 and 1943 almost exclusively in small or supporting roles. He was, according to film academic Ginette Vincendeau, a "brilliant, extravagant actor" who "specialised in louche, menacing or diabolical characters".

A collaborator with the Nazis during the occupation, who openly expressed fascist attitudes, he vanished while playing Jéricho in Children of Paradise (Les Enfants du Paradis), a film deliberately released in May 1945 shortly after the liberation of Europe; Le Vigan was replaced by Pierre Renoir. He was sentenced to forced labour for 10 years in 1946. Released on parole after three years working in a camp, Le Vigan absconded to Spain, and then Argentina, appearing in several films in both countries in supporting roles. Le Vigan died on 12 October 1972 in the city of Tandil.

== Selected filmography ==
- Moon Over Morocco (1931) - Donald Strawber
- Radio Follies (1931)
- The Yellow Dog (1932) - Le docteur Ernest Michoux
- Une jeune fille et un million (1932) - L'employé brouillon de l'agence
- Coquin de sort (1932)
- Boubouroche (1933) - Potasse
- Knock (1933) - Mousquet, le pharmacien
- The Little King (1933) - Le fou
- The Tunnel (1933) - Brooce - un Ouvrier Félon
- L'homme à la barbiche (1933) - Jérôme de Valvert / Le demi-frère de Jérôme de Valvert
- Madame Bovary (1934) - Lheureux
- The Ideal Woman (1934) - Girardin
- Street Without a Name (1934) - Vanoël
- Famille nombreuse (1934) - L'adjudant-chef Sandri
- Maria Chapdelaine (1934) - Tit-Sèbe, le rebouteux
- Bien mal acquis (1934)
- The Coquelet Affair (1935) - Poireau, le jardinier
- Golgotha (1935) (known as Behold the Man in English) - Jésus Christ
- La bandera (1935) - Fernando Lucas
- Jérôme Perreau héros des barricades (1936) - Cardinal Mazarin
- The Mutiny of the Elsinore (1936) - Charles Davis
- La ronde du brigadier Bellot (1936)
- Prince of the Six Days (1936) - Fouilloux, un spectateur
- A Legionnaire (1936) - Leduc
- Jenny (1936) - L'Albinos
- Hélène (1936) - Le docteur Régnier
- The Lower Depths (1936) - L'acteur alcoolique
- Romarin (1937) - Le brigadier Napoléon Orsini
- The Man from Nowhere (1937) - Le comte Papiano
- Franco de port (1937) - Henri
- The Citadel of Silence (1937) - Granoff
- Harvest (Regain) (1937) - Le gendarme (uncredited)
- The Woman from the End of the World (1938) - Arlanger, l'armateur
- The West (1938) - Taïeb el Haïn
- Boys' School (1938) - César le passe-muraille
- Storm Over Asia (1938) - Sir Richard
- Le Quai des brumes (1938) - Le peintre
- The Little Thing (1938) - Roger
- L'avion de minuit (1938) - Le Docteur
- Ernest the Rebel (1938) - Le gouverneur-président de Mariposa
- The Fatted Calf (1939) - Grussgolt
- Louise (1939) - Le peintre Gaston
- The World Will Tremble (1939) - Le Greffier
- Le Dernier Tournant (1939) - Le cousin maître-chanteur
- The Phantom Carriage (1939) - Le père Martin
- Paradise Lost (1940) - Édouard Bordenave
- Romance of Paris (1941) - Monsieur Lormel
- Who Killed Santa Claus? (1941) - Léon Villard, le maître d'école
- Dédé la musique (1941) - Fernand l'Américain
- Room 13 (1942) - Fenouil
- White Patrol (1942) - Le commissaire Pascal
- Private Life (1942) - Rémi Géraud
- Andorra ou les hommes d'Airain (1942) - Asnurri
- Chiffon's Wedding (1942) - Maître Blondin - l'huissier
- Business Is Business (1942) - Phinck
- La grande marnière (1943) - Fleury
- The Heart of a Nation (1943) - L'oncle Michel Froment (uncredited)
- It Happened at the Inn (1943) - Goupi-Tonkin
- Don't Shout It from the Rooftops (1943) - Le professeur Léonard Bontagues
- The Man Who Sold His Soul (1943) - Grégori
- The Ménard Collection (1944) - Amédée Garbure
- Bifur 3 (1945) - Paul (uncredited)
- The King's Mail (1951) - Peabody
- The Orchid (1951) - The father
- Ley del mar (1952) - Rafael
- Rio turbio (1952) - Levignan (final film role)
