= Ded Rysel =

French actor

- Born: 14 March 1903; Bar-le-Duc, Meuse, France
- Died: 19 September 1975 (aged 72); Paris, France
- Occupation: Actor
- Years active: 1949–1957 (film)

Ded Rysel (1903–1975) was a French radio and film actor. He starred in several film during the 1950s including a trilogy in which he played the character Piédalu. He appeared in the radio show La Famille Duraton and its 1955 film adaptation The Duratons (1955).

== Selected filmography ==
- Piédalu in Paris (1951)
- Piédalu Works Miracles (1952)
- Piédalu député (1954)
- The Duratons (1955)
- La joyeuse prison (1956)
- Bonjour jeunesse (1957)

== Bibliography ==
- Dyer, Richard & Vincendeau, Ginette. Popular European Cinema. Routledge, 2013.
- Goble, Alan. The Complete Index to Literary Sources in Film. Walter de Gruyter, 1999.
