= Henri-François Rey =

Henri-François Rey (July 31, 1919 in Toulouse – July 22, 1987 in Paris) was a French writer, dramaturge and screenwriter. His book La Fête espagnole (The Spanish party) won the 1959 Prix des Deux Magots. His best-known work, Les Pianos mécaniques (Mechanical pianos) won the Interallié prize in 1962, and was adapted to film by Juan Antonio Bardem in 1965 as The Uninhibited.

== Works ==
- La Fête espagnole (1958)
- La comédie (1960)
- Les Pianos mécaniques (1962)
- Les Chevaux masqués (1965)
- Le Rachdingue (1967)
- Halleluyah ma vie (1970)
- Le Barbare (1972)
- Schizophrénie, ma soeur (1973)
- Dali dans son labyrinthe (1974)
- La parodie (1980)
- Feu le palais d'hiver (1981)
- A l'ombre de moi-même (1981)
- Le sacre de la putain (1983)
- La jeune fille nue (1986)
- Le café Méliton (1987)
