= Signé Arsène Lupin =

- Directed by: Yves Robert
- Written by: Maurice Leblanc; Yves Robert; Jean-Paul Rappeneau; Diego Fabbri
- Based on: Arsène Lupin by Maurice Leblanc
- Starring: Robert Lamoureux
- Cinematography: Maurice Barry
- Music by: Georges Van Parys
- Release date: 11 November 1959
- Running time: 100 minutes
- Countries: France; Italy
- Language: French

Signé Arsène Lupin (Italian: Il ritorno di Arsenio Lupin, also known as Signed, Arsene Lupin) is a 1959 French-Italian crime film written and directed by Yves Robert. It is the sequel of The Adventures of Arsène Lupin (1957).

== Plot ==
Arsène Lupin and his accomplice La Ballu rob a villa. Being disturbed by the police, they have time to take a picture. This painting represents a fresco in three parts, La Ballu steals the second painting. The third painting is in the Florence Museum but when Lupin arrives, the painting is gone.

== Cast ==
- Robert Lamoureux: André Laroche / Arsène Lupin
- Alida Valli: Aurelia Valeano
- Jacques Dufilho: Albert
- Robert Dalban: Inspector Béchoux
- Michel Etcheverry: Van Nelden
- Jean Galland: General
- Harold Kay: Henri
- Paul Müller: Attache at the embassy in Rome
- Ginette Pigeon: Agnès
- Roger Dumas: Isidore Beautrelet aka Véritas
- Yves Robert: La Ballu
- Gabriel Gobin: Employee of the SNCF
- Paul Préboist: Drunk man
- Robert Rollis: Traveler on the train
