= Robert Lamoureux =

French actor

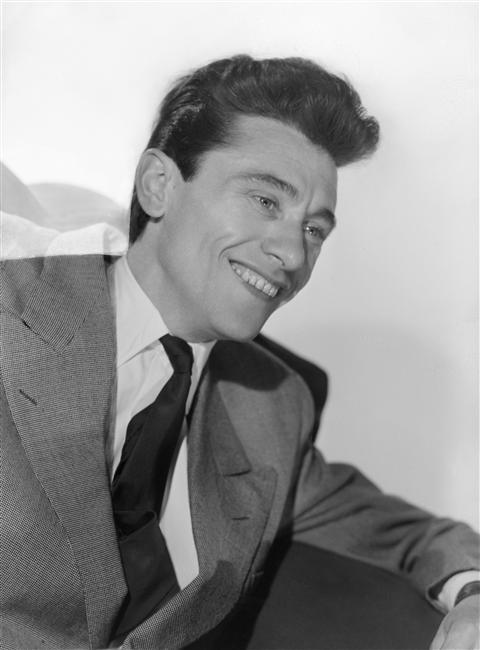
- Born: 4 January 1920; Paris, France
- Died: 29 October 2011 (aged 91); Boulogne-Billancourt, France
- Occupations: Actor, screenwriter, film director
- Years active: 1950–2005

Robert Lamoureux (4 January 1920 – 29 October 2011) was a French actor, screenwriter and film director. He appeared in more than 30 films between 1951 and 1994. He starred in the film The Adventures of Arsène Lupin, which was entered into the 7th Berlin International Film Festival. He was married to the actress Magali Vendeuil.

== Honors and awards ==
- Knight of the Order of Legion of Honour (1989)
- Officer of the Order of Legion of Honour (2000)

== Partial filmography ==
- The King of Camelots (1951) - Robert
- Adele's Gift (1951) - Himself
- Chacun son tour (1951) - Robert Montfort
- Au fil des ondes (1951) - Himself
- Allô... je t'aime (1952) - Pierre Palette
- Open Letter (1953) - Martial Simonet
- The Enchanting Enemy (1953) - Roberto Mancini
- Saluti e baci (1953) - Himself
- Women of Paris (1953) - Himself - Animateur de spectacle
- Virgile (1953) - François Virgile
- Service Entrance (1954) - François Berthier
- Papa, maman, la bonne et moi (1954) - Robert Langlois
- Magic Village (1955) - Robert
- Papa, maman, ma femme et moi (1955) - Robert Langlois
- If Paris Were Told to Us (1956) - Latude
- Meeting in Paris (1956) - Maurice Legrand
- Une fée... pas comme les autres (1956) - Narrator
- The Adventures of Arsène Lupin (1957) - André Laroche / Arsène Lupin / Aldo Parolini
- L'amour est en jeu (1957) - Robert Fayard
- Life Together (1958) - Thierry Raval
- Signé Arsène Lupin (1959) - Arsène Lupin / Le lieutenant André Laroche
- La brune que voilà (1960) - Germain Vignon
- Love and the Frenchwoman (1960) - Monsieur Desire / Frederic Leroy (segment "Femme seule, La")
- Ravishing (1960) - Thierry
- Now Where Did the 7th Company Get to? (1973, director) - Colonel Blanchet
- Impossible Is Not French (1974) - The Gardener
- Opération Lady Marlène (1975) - Le Général
- The Seventh Company Outdoors (1977, director)
- The Apprentice Heel (1977) - Antoine Chapelot
- Le jour des rois (1991) - Albert
