= La Belle Image =

La Belle Image may refer to:

- La Belle Image (novel), a 1941 novel by French writer Marcel Aymé
- The Beautiful Image, a 1951 French drama film directed by Claude Heyman based on Aymé's novel.
