= Marie of the Port =

Marie of the Port (French: La Marie du port) may refer to

- Marie of the Port (novel), a 1938 novel by Georges Simenon
- Marie of the Port (film), a 1950 French film directed by Marcel Carné
