= The Moon Birds =

Play by Marcel Aymé

The Moon Birds (Les oiseaux de lune) is a play by the French playwright Marcel Aymé.

The play was premiered in 1955 by André Barsacq at the Théâtre de l'Atelier in Paris. The leading role of Valentin was created by Jacques Duby.

== Synopsis ==
The young and imaginative Valentin is a supervisor at a private school. Although he is in love with the secretary Sylvie, he is still in the midst of a miserable, joyless human world.

Egoism and malice, greed and avarice, lust for pleasure and uncontrolled instinct, mendacity and jealousy characterize the life of the directorate family related to him; Chabert and Valentin themselves are haplessly married, their marriages a pointless formality: parents and children are at war; Old Chabert suffers from the agony of work, his daughter Elisa from her ugliness, his sons-in-law are professional wretches who only know how to bring forth an excess of unwanted children, while his wife leads her unfulfilled life through the luxury of flashy hats and more amorous ones Seeks to enhance escapades.

Poverty and quarrels in the school management's family are unpleasantly punctuated by the rebelliousness, stupidity and instinctiveness of the students, by the cruelty and dissolute lifestyle of their parents.

In view of this overall less than human existence, Valentin decides to transform humanity all around into birds, which he typically calls a "spiritual operation", i.e. no magic, no trick game.

In this way, on the spur of the moment and without much fuss, Valentin enchants everyone who "embarrasses him (!)", As he calls it. The lustful math teacher Bobignot, the lewd and untalented students Duperrier and Arbelin, the arrest-mad and "rough" inspectors Malfrin and Grindet, the sadistic Papa Périsson, the humorless bureaucratic representatives of the school authorities and finally almost everyone around him.

The transformed, however, by no means turn out to be cast out and subject to an evil curse, but rather as liberated and happy. After all, the moonbirds, which become humans again at the new moon, testify to the higher moral quality of their bird existence, because they have finally gained an eye for the essentials.

== Broadway ==
The Broadway Premiere was released in 1959 by Leo Kerz and produced by Harry Belafonte. The production stars in Opening Night Cast Wally Cox as Valentin, Phyllis Newman as Sylvie and Mark Rydell as Raoul Martinon.

== Adaptations ==
The drama was filmed in 1963 by Peter Zadek starring Klaus Kinski as Valentin and Ilse Pagé as Sylvie. A television film was made in France in 1971 starring Jacques Duby as Valentin and Claude Jade as Sylvie. The film was directed by André Barsacq, who had staged the premiere of the play in 1955, in which Jacques Duby had played Valentin at the time.
