= The House of Men =

Novel by Marcel Aymé

The House of Men (Maison basse) is a novel by French writer Marcel Aymé that tells the story of a group of tenants living in a large, modern, and soulless Parisian building that faces a small detached house that presents itself, by contrast, as an oasis of humanity.

The novel was written between the autumn of 1934 and the beginning of 1935, and originally appeared as a serial in Marianne between 17 April and 19 June 1935 before being published by Gallimard shortly thereafter.

== Synopsis ==
The action of the novel takes place in the Epinettes district of Paris's 17th arrondissement during the 1930s, against the backdrop of an economic crisis and the seizure of power in Germany by the Nazis.

The story, punctuated by the ongoing suicidal attempts of a tenant, begins with the death of the elderly spinster who owns the building, and ends with the tragic death of a little girl who dies of fright because she dares not call for help. Everything takes place in an atmosphere of indifference and hostility between the tenants; only the small, low house presents itself as an oasis of humanity.

== English translations ==
Maison basse has been translated into English once as The House of Men by Norman Denny for The Bodley Head in 1952.
