= Les Contes du chat perché =

Collection of stories written by Marcel Aymé

- Author: Marcel Aymé
- Language: French
- Genre: Fairy tale
- Publication place: France
- ISBN: 978-2-07036343-8

Les Contes du chat perché is a collection of stories written by Marcel Aymé in French, published between 1934 and 1946.

The narratives are presented from the perspectives of Delphine and Marinette, two school-aged girls living on a farm with their parents and animals capable of speech. The girls and the animals form a group that often opposes the adults, particularly their parents. The parents, depicted as rural farmers, care for their daughters but interact with them and the animals in a direct, practical manner. They view the animals solely for their utility, in contrast to the girls, who engage with them as if they were human. Marcel Aymé described the stories as intended for “children aged 4 to 75”.

== Presentation ==
=== Marcel Aymé's introduction ===
Marcel Aymé described the origin of Les Contes du chat perché as follows: while sitting under an apple tree, a cat shared tales known only to him, involving local animals and two girls, Delphine and Marinette, who were his friends. Aymé stated that he recorded these stories without alteration. He noted that, according to the cat, they were appropriate for children still young enough to understand and converse with animals.

=== Story summaries ===
- Le Loup: Delphine and Marinette, alone on the farm, encounter a wolf at the door requesting entry. Despite their parents’ warnings about wolves, the girls consider letting him in, influenced by his words rather than tales like Little Red Riding Hood and the lamb's fate.
- Les Bœufs: Delphine and Marinette, strong students at school, attempt to teach the farm’s two oxen to read. This effort disrupts the oxen’s usual work as draught animals.
- Le Chien: The girls adopt a crippled dog, though it’s uncertain how their parents and the cat will react. Later, they learn the unusual cause of the dog’s blindness.
- Le Petit coq noir: This story was excluded from standard collections of Les Contes du chat perché but appears in some complete editions of Aymé’s works, making it less widely recognized.
- L'Éléphant: While their parents are absent, Delphine and Marinette organize a Noah’s Ark game with the farm animals. A white hen participates, assigned the role of an elephant.
- Le Mauvais jars: During a ball game in the meadow, Delphine and Marinette encounter a gander with an abrasive demeanor. A donkey assists them in addressing the gander’s behavior.
- La Buse et le cochon: The farm is unsettled when the donkey overhears the parents planning to slaughter the pig the next day. Delphine, Marinette, and the animals collaborate to prevent this.
- L'Âne et le cheval: Before bedtime, Delphine and Marinette wish to become a white horse and a gray donkey, respectively. They awaken to find their wishes fulfilled.
- Le Canard et la panthère: When the duck learns the parents might eat him, Delphine and Marinette suggest he travel, given his interest in geography. He returns months later with a panther as a companion.
- Le Paon: After their cousin Flora’s visit, Delphine and Marinette seek greater elegance. The pig, inspired by a peacock from a nearby château, shares this ambition.
- Le Cerf et le chien: A deer, fleeing hunters, seeks refuge on the farm. Delphine and Marinette protect it and befriend one of the pursuing hunting dogs.
- Les Cygnes: While their parents are away, Delphine and Marinette take an orphaned puppy to a meeting for lost children, hoping it finds a family. Swans managing the event mistake the puppies for lost children and worry about their return home.
- Le Mouton: A sheep, a friend of Delphine and Marinette, is traded to a soldier as a mount. The girls set out to retrieve it.
- Les Boîtes de peinture: During vacation, Delphine and Marinette use paint boxes from Uncle Alfred to create portraits of the farm animals in the meadow. The animals dislike the results, leading to unexpected outcomes.
- Les Vaches: Delphine and Marinette lose the cows they were tasked with herding. The pig investigates, suspecting a family of gypsies in a nearby meadow.
- La Patte du chat: After a mistake, the girls face the possibility of staying with their strict Aunt Mélina. Alphonse the cat intervenes, using his ability to summon rain by placing his paw behind his ear.
- Le Problème: The parents struggle with an arithmetic problem due that evening, prompting Delphine and Marinette to enlist the animals’ help in solving it.
- Le Mammouth: As Delphine and Marinette prepare for school, they hear an odd noise and discover a mammoth in the yard.

== Editions and illustrations ==
In 1963, Gallimard published Les Contes du chat perché in two volumes: Les Contes bleus du chat perché, containing eight stories, and Les Contes rouges du chat perché, containing seven stories. A single-volume collection, titled Les Contes du chat perché, was released posthumously in 1969, compiling all the tales. The initial 1934 edition of the stories featured 67 watercolor illustrations by Natan Altman, a Russian avant-garde artist residing in Paris at the time.

=== Les Contes rouges du chat perché (1963) ===
- Les Bœufs (1934);
- Le Chien (1934);
- Le Paon (1938);
- Les Boîtes de peinture (1941);
- Les Vaches (1942);
- La Patte du chat (1944);
- Le Problème (1946);

=== Contes bleus du chat perché (1963) ===
- Le loup;
- Le cerf et le chien;
- L'éléphant;
- Le canard et la panthère;
- Le mauvais jars;
- L'âne et le cheval;
- Le mouton;
- Les cygnes.

Three stories featuring the same protagonists—Delphine and Marinette—were not included in the 1963 volumes but appear in later collections: Le Petit coq noir (1934), La Buse et le cochon (1936), Le Loup et le chat (1938).

== Allographic sequences ==
Two typescripts were found among the personal papers of Marcel Aymé’s widow, Marie-Antoinette, after her death in 1994. Michel Lécureur, in his notes for Œuvres romanesques complètes, Tome II (Bibliothèque de la Pléiade, 1998), observes that these documents lack any handwritten annotations or signatures. He further notes that their style, rhythm, syntax, and vocabulary differ significantly from the seventeen Contes du chat perché published by Aymé between 1934 and 1946. Consequently, the attribution of these tales to Marcel Aymé remains uncertain, and their authorship has been claimed by Frédéric Lerich, a French physician who asserts he wrote them in 1967 for his children.

The following stories, discovered posthumously, were published by Gallimard and included in later collections despite the authorship debate:

- Le Mammouth;
- Le Commis du père Noël;

These tales, featuring Delphine and Marinette, were initially released in the Gallimard Jeunesse series in 1997 and 1996, respectively, before being appended to Œuvres romanesques complètes, Tome II (1998). Their inclusion reflects their association with the Chat perché universe, though their origins remain contested.

== Adaptations ==
=== Television adaptation ===
- 1968 Adaptation: Directed by Arlen Papazian, this version aired on ORTF's second channel starting December 21, 1968.
- 1994 Restoration: Jacques Colombat restored Les Contes du chat perché for France Animation, using illustrations by Roland and Claudine Sabatier from Gallimard Jeunesse editions. The animated series premiered on Canal+ on December 26, 1994, and in Quebec on Télévision de Radio-Canada on September 9, 1995.

=== Comics ===
Illustrated by Agnès Maupré and published by Gallimard in 2007, this adaptation covers selected tales from Les Contes du chat perché.

=== Audiobook ===
==== Les contes bleus du chat perché ====
Features adaptations of Le Loup and L’Éléphant, narrated by Michel Galabru, Roger Carel, and Perrette Pradier. Released by Gallimard Jeunesse in 2004.

==== Les contes rouges du chat perché ====
Includes adaptations of La Patte du chat, Le Chien, Les Boîtes de peinture, and Le Paon, narrated by Michel Galabru, Roger Carel, and Perrette Pradier. Released by Gallimard Jeunesse in 1998.

=== Discs ===
==== Les contes bleus du chat perché ====
Contains adaptations of Le Loup and Le Problème, narrated by François Perier, Frédérique Hébrard, Laurence Badie, and Jean Rochefort. Released in 1965 by Disques Vogue.

==== Les contes rouges du chat perché ====
Includes adaptations of Les Bœufs and Le Chien, narrated by François Perier, Frédérique Hébrard, Laurence Badie, Michel Galabru, and Henri Virlojeux. Released in 1965 by Disques Vogue.

=== Theater ===
- Le Loup: Directed by Véronique Vella at the Studio-Théâtre de la Comédie-Française in 2015;
- Le Cerf et le Chien: Directed by Véronique Vella at the Studio-Théâtre de la Comédie-Française in 2017;
- Le Chien: Directed by Raphaëlle Saudinos and Véronique Vella at the Studio-Théâtre de la Comédie-Française in 2023.

=== Opera ===
- Chat Perché: A rural opera by Caroline Gautier with music by Jean-Marc Singier, premiered at the Opéra Bastille Amphithéâtre on March 11, 2011.

== Bibliografia ==
- Brunel, Pierre (2001). La Littérature française du XXe siècle (in French). Presses Universitaires de France. ISBN 978-2-13-051672-9.
- d’Humières, Catherine, ed. (2009). La Littérature de jeunesse en question(s) (in French). Presses universitaires de Rennes. ISBN 978-2-13-051672-9.
