= Le Moulin de la Sourdine =

Le Moulin de la Sourdine (1936), translated as The Secret Stream, is a novel by French writer Marcel Aymé.

== Plot ==
In a small provincial French town (based on Dole, where the author grew up), a notary in the grip of his sexual fantasies savagely murders his young maid. A schoolboy happens to witness the crime during an escapade atop a church bell tower, but after the maid's body is discovered, suspicions quickly fall upon a vagrant with a physical deformity.

== Publication ==
Written between the fall of 1935 and the spring of 1936, Le Moulin de la Sourdine first appeared as a serial in Marianne from 29 April to 5 August 1936 before being published by Gallimard. The book was translated into English by Norman Denny for the Bodley Head in 1953 and Harper in 1954.

== Reception ==
Kirkus Reviews wrote that the book "lacks the satiric invention of [Aymé's] later books, but there's cutting edge to this portfolio of life in a small town in the French provinces and the covert conduct of its leading citizens".
