= The Green Mare =

Novel by Marcel Aymé

- Cover of first French edition
- Author: Marcel Aymé
- Original title: La Jument Verte
- Translator: Anonymous, 1938; Norman Denny, 1955
- Language: French
- Publisher: Gallimard
- Publication date: 1933
- Publication place: France
- English publication date: 1938, 1955
- Media type: Print
- Pages: 340 (French ed.)

The Green Mare (French: La Jument Verte) is a humorous novel by French writer Marcel Aymé first published by Gallimard in 1933.

Aymé probably wrote La Jument verte during 1932 and early 1933. The novel was published to great success in June 1933, but provoked violent reactions from some quarters due to its frank depictions of sex.

The story is divided into seventeen chapters and is written using the third person narrative mode; interspersed between them are a number of interludes all entitled "The Observations of the Green Mare" which are written as first person narratives. These two different narrative modes used throughout the book allow the reader to observe the characters and situations from slightly different perspectives.

The novel is essentially an examination of the sexual mores and behaviors of the members of a small 19th century French village (the fictitious Claquebue in the Jura department) around the time of the Franco-Prussian War. The plot concerns a feud that has taken place for generations between the Haudouin and Maloret families, and a missing letter that contains revealing secrets relating to the conflict. The green mare of the title is in fact a magical painting of an unusually-colored horse owned by one of the Haudouins that has somehow been imbued with an observing consciousness by the artist who painted it.

The Green Mare has been translated into English twice, first by an anonymous translator for The Fortune Press in 1938, and then by Norman Denny for The Bodley Head in 1955.

The book was filmed by Claude Autant-Lara in 1959 as The Green Mare.
