= André Barsacq =

French theatre director, producer, scenic designer and playwright

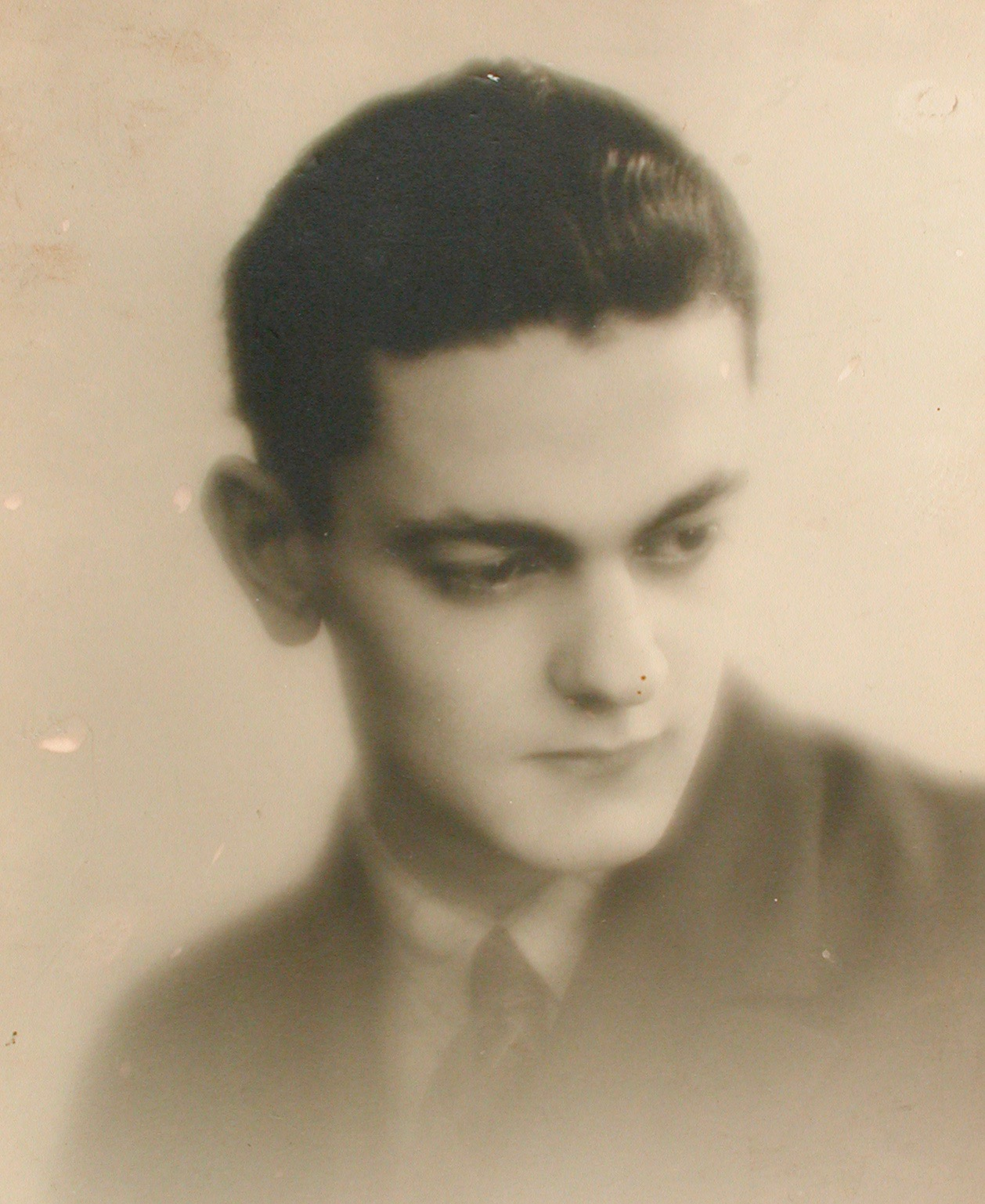
- André Barsacq in 1930
- Born: 24 January 1909; Feodosiya, Crimea, Russian Empire
- Died: 8 July 1973 (aged 64); Paris, France
- Occupations: Theatre director, producer, scenic designer, playwright.

André Barsacq (24 January 1909 – 8 July 1973) was a French theatre director, producer, scenic designer, and playwright. From 1940 to 1973 he was the director of the Théâtre de l'Atelier. He was the brother of Russian production designer Léon Barsacq and the uncle of film actor Yves Barsacq.

== Life and career ==
Barsacq was born in the city of Feodosiya in Crimea. His father was French and his mother was Russian. At the age of 15 he traveled to Paris to study at the School of Decorative Arts and lived in France from then on. In 1928 he was at the Théâtre de l'Atelier working with its director, Charles Dullin on productions which included Jules Romains's 1923 play Knock.

As director of the Théâtre de l'Atelier he introduced Parisian audiences to the plays of Ugo Betti, Félicien Marceau, Marcel Ayme (The Moon Birds), Françoise Sagan, René de Obaldia, and Friedrich Dürrenmatt. He successfully adapted the works of Chekhov, Dostoevsky, and Turgenev for the French stage. During his career he worked with Antonin Artaud, Jean-Louis Barrault, and Jacques Copeau.

Barsacq was a great admirer of Jean Anouilh and beginning with Le Bal des voleurs at Théâtre des Arts in 1938 produced almost all his plays, including, at some personal risk, the subversive Antigone in 1944 during the Nazi occupation.

André Barsacq also worked with many major filmmakers including Marcel L'Herbier, Pierre Chenal, Jean Grémillon, Max Ophüls, and Pierre Billon.

== Broadway shows ==
- 1963: Bérénice (director) Brooks Atkinson Theatre
- 1960: The Good Soup (writer, director) Plymouth Theatre
- 1957: Volpone (scenic design, costume design) Winter Garden Theatre

== Filmography ==
Director and screenwriter

- 1952: Crimson Curtain (director and screenwriter)
- 1960: The Players (TV movie) (screenplay and adaptation)
- 1964: Castle in Sweden (TV movie) (director)
- 1966: A Month in the Country (TV movie) (director)
- 1967: King Stag (TV movie) (director)
- 1968: The Idiot (TV movie) (adaptation)
- 1969: The Government Inspector (TV movie) (director)
- 1972: The Birds of the Moon (TV movie) (director)
- 1972: David (the night falls (TV movie) (director)
- 1972: The Babur (TV movie) (director)
- 1972: The Villains (TV movie) (director)

Production designer

- 1928: L'argent [dir: Marcel L'Herbier] (artistic director)
- 1928: Maldone [dir: Jean Grémillon] (scenic designer)
- 1929: The Lighthouse Keepers [dir: Jean Grémillon] (designer and assistant director)
- 1934: La dolorosa [dir: Jean Grémillon] (assistant director)
- 1936: Southern Mail [dir: Pierre Billon] (scenic designer)
- 1937: Yoshiwara [dir: Max Ophüls] (artistic director)
- 1940: Volpone [dir: Maurice Tourneur] (scenic designer)
- 1942: The Honorable Catherine [dir: Marcel L'Herbier] (artistic director)
- 1942: Summer Light [dir: Jean Grémillon] (artistic director)
