= The Inspector Likes a Fight =

1957 film

- Directed by: Jean Devaivre
- Written by: Gabriel Germain (as G. Germain) (as Scénario); Jean Devaivre (adaptation); Jean Devaivre (dialogue); Pierre Apestéguy (dialogue)
- Produced by: Simone Devaivre
- Starring: Nicole Courcel; Paul Meurisse; Louis Velle
- Cinematography: Christian Gaveau
- Edited by: Simone du Bron
- Music by: Joseph Kosma
- Color process: Black and white
- Production companies: Les Films Neptune; La Société des Films Sirius
- Distributed by: La Société des Films Sirius
- Release date: 12 June 1957
- Running time: 103 minutes
- Country: France
- Language: French

The Inspector Likes a Fight (French: L'inspecteur aime la bagarre) is a 1957 French crime thriller film directed by Jean Devaivre and starring Nicole Courcel, Paul Meurisse and Louis Velle. It was shot at the Saint-Maurice Studios in Paris and on location at the city's Orly Airport. The film's sets were designed by the art director Paul-Louis Boutié.

== Plot ==
Twin brothers Georges and Jacques Pile are separated after the death of their parents. The first lives in Paris, the second in Brussels. when Georges is suspected of having killed an airplane manufacturer and stolen plans for an engine, Jacques decides to take his place to protect him and will do everything to compromise the investigation.

== Cast ==
- Nicole Courcel as Hélène Davault
- Paul Meurisse as L'inspecteur Morice
- Louis Velle as Jacques Pile / Georges Pile
- Jean Tissier as Jules - la valet de chambre
- Albert Dinan as Raty (as Dinan)
- Bernard Dhéran as Barat
- Jane Marken as Nène Thierry
- Jackie Blanchot as Rey (as Jacky Blanchot)
- Georges Demas as Victor
- Jean Daurand as Un gangster
- Henri Riou as Himself
- Lucien Anquetil as Himself
- Georges Bever as Himself (as Bever)
- Roland Toutain as Gil Fokkerman
- Gloria France as La Passante

== Bibliography ==
- Rège, Philippe. Encyclopedia of French Film Directors, Volume 1. Scarecrow Press, 2009.
- Hischak, Thomas S. The Encyclopedia of Film Composers. Rowman & Littlefield, 2015.
