= Mr. Peek-a-Boo =

1951 film

Garou-Garou, le Passe-muraille
- Directed by: Jean Boyer
- Written by: Michel Audiard and Marcel Aymé
- Produced by: Jacques Bar, Robert Dorfmann
- Cinematography: Charles Suin
- Edited by: Fanchette Mazin
- Music by: Georges Van Parys
- Distributed by: Les Films Corona
- Release date: 6 April 1951
- Running time: 74 minutes
- Countries: France; Italy
- Language: French

Mr. Peek-a-Boo or Garou-Garou, le Passe-muraille (often shortened to just Le Passe-muraille) is a 1951 French superhero comedy film, directed by Jean Boyer. The film is based on the 1941 short story Le Passe-muraille by Marcel Aymé about a "man who could walk through walls". The film premiered on 6 April 1951.

== Plot ==
Léon, a simple civil servant, who has the unusual ability to walk through walls, falls madly in love with a hotel thief by the name of Susan. He poses as the notorious gangster Garou-Garou to attempt to woo her affections, but is arrested and sent to prison. As a prisoner he annoys the guards by walking in and out of his cell, and keeps asking Susan to cease her criminal way of life. As fundamentally being an honest and law-abiding citizen, he eventually handles back everything he has stolen, is acquitted by the court, and becomes famous and respected. When he learns that Susan is planning to return to England and start a new life, he decides to confess his emotions to her. However, the couple is interrupted by a sudden rush of journalists. Trying to escape in a building, they get cornered on a corridor, and Léon pushes Susan through a nearby wall. But by doing this, he loses his own wall-walking ability, and the film concludes.

== Cast ==
- Bourvil ... Léon Dutilleul
- Joan Greenwood ... Susan
- Gérard Oury... Maurice
- Roger Tréville ... Félix Burdin
- Jacques Erwin ... Gaston
- Marcelle Arnold as Germaine
- Frédéric O'Brady ... the medical specialist (as O'Brady)
- René Worms ... an employee at the ministry
- Nina Myral ... Mrs. Eloise
- André Dalibert
- Nicole Riche ... the lady on the second floor
- Germaine Reuver ... Mrs. Ménard, the concierge
- Jeanne Véniat ... the South-American lady
- Georges Flateau ... Mr Robert
- Edmond Beauchamp ... Arturo (as Beauchamp)
- Henri Crémieux ... Gustave Lécuyer

== Overview ==
Le Passe-muraille launched the film career of its star, Bourvil, who at the time was only known as a stage comic and singer. Bourvil plays the character of Léon, an ordinary man of the street with particular affection for women, especially Joan Greenwood's character, Susan.

The film is noted for its surprising quality of the special effects which were in their infancy at the time this film was made. The film was released in black and white although a colour version of the film also exists.

== See also ==
- The Man Who Walked Through the Wall (1959)
