= Le Chemin des écoliers (novel) =

Novel by Marcel Aymé

Le Chemin des écoliers (1946), literally "The Way of the Schoolboys," but translated as The Transient Hour, is a novel by French writer Marcel Aymé that takes place during the German occupation of Paris. It is the second book in a trilogy which covers the pre-war, war, and post-war periods in France. The first is Travelingue (1948), set in the time of the Front Populaire; the third book, Uranus, focuses on post war France and the purge: the social cleansing which sought to discipline collaborators.

== Plot introduction ==
Pierre Michaud is a tender, scrupulous man, who clings to outdated conceptions of the world. His sons, Frédéric and Antoine, unwittingly teach him how to live again by forcing him to accept more current notions of reality. The novel presents a wide range of characters whose behaviors range from refusal to compromise with the occupier to total collaboration with the Germans. As their father becomes increasingly more corrupt, Frédéric and Antoine distribute anti-Nazi leaflets and profit from the black market.

== English translation ==
Le Chemin des écoliers has been translated into English as The Transient Hour by Eric Sutton for the Bodley Head in 1948.

== Film adaptation ==
The book was filmed in 1959 by Michel Boisrond.
