= The Man Who Walked Through the Wall =

1959 film

- Theatrical release poster
- Directed by: Ladislao Vajda
- Screenplay by: István Békeffy; Hans Jacoby
- Based on: The Man Who Walked Through Walls by Marcel Aymé
- Produced by: Kurt Ulrich
- Starring: Heinz Rühmann; Nicole Courcel
- Cinematography: Bruno Mondi
- Edited by: Hermann Haller
- Music by: Franz Grothe
- Release date: 14 October 1959
- Running time: 99 minutes
- Country: West Germany
- Language: German

The Man Who Walked Through the Wall (German: Ein Mann geht durch die Wand) is a 1959 West German comedy film directed by Ladislao Vajda, starring Heinz Rühmann and Nicole Courcel. It was shot at the Bavaria Studios in Munich. The film is based on the 1941 novella The Man Who Walked Through Walls by Marcel Aymé. It tells the story of a man who discovers that he has the ability to walk through walls.

== Cast ==
- Heinz Rühmann as Herr Buchsbaum
- Nicole Courcel as Yvonne Steiner
- Rudolf Rhomberg as Painter
- Rudolf Vogel as Fuchs
- Peter Vogel as Hirschfeld
- Hubert von Meyerinck as Pickler
- Hans Leibelt as Holtzheimer

== Release ==
The film premiered in Germany on 14 October 1959. It was released in the United States on 16 October 1964.

== See also ==
- Mr. Peek-a-Boo (1951)
