= Vogue la galère =

1973 film

- Based on: Vogue la galère by Marcel Aymé
- Directed by: Raymond Rouleau
- Starring: Claude Dauphin
- Country of origin: France
- Original language: French

Original release
- Release: 20 December 1973

Vogue la galère [lit. Let the galley sail on; Come what may] is a 1973 French television film directed by Raymond Rouleau. It is based on the play Vogue la galère by Marcel Aymé. The film stars Claude Dauphin and Robert Hossein and is one of the early roles of Isabelle Huppert.

== Cast ==
- Claude Dauphin - the captain
- Robert Hossein - Simon
- Henry Czarniak - Hardouin
- Gérard Lartigau - Lazare
- Mario David - Hersandieu
- Xavier Depraz - Comité
- Hubert Deschamps - Nicaise
- Guy Di Rigo - Montbusard
- Pierre Duncan - Main-Gauche
- Marc Eyraud - the defrocked priest
- René Havard - Petit Rouquier
- Isabelle Huppert - Clotilde
- Micheline Luccioni - Marion
- Antoine Marin - Argousier
- Pierre Massimi - the lieutenant

== Broadcast ==
The film was first broadcast on the Office de Radiodiffusion Télévision Française on 20 December 1974.

== Reception ==
A contemporary review in the Nouvel Observateur found the production deceiving, despite prestigious names in the cast. In 1977 Jean Dutourd found that the production was "the best thing television ha[d] shown us" and commented on the fact that, ironically, that fiction was based on the belief that mankind was inherently bad.

== See also ==
- Isabelle Huppert on screen and stage
