= The Hollow Field =

Novel by Marcel Aymé

- Author: Marcel Aymé
- Original title: La Table-aux-crevés
- Translator: Helen Waddell
- Publisher: Éditions Gallimard
- Publication date: 14 October 1929
- English publication date: 1933
- Pages: 276

The Hollow Field (French: La Table aux crevés) is a 1929 novel by the French writer Marcel Aymé. It tells the story of the rivalry between two farming villages, Cantagrel and Cessigney, which is triggered after a failed attempt at tobacco smuggling. An English translation by Helen Waddell was published in 1933.

The novel received the Prix Renaudot. It was adapted into the 1951 film The Village Feud, directed by Henri Verneuil and starring Fernandel, Maria Mauban and Fernand Sardou.
