= La Belle Image (novel) =

1941 French novel

- 1972 edition book cover
- Author: Marcel Aymé
- Original title: La Belle Image
- Translator: Norman Denny & Sophie Lewis
- Language: French
- Genre: Fiction
- Publisher: Gallimard
- Publication date: 1941
- Publication place: France
- English publication date: 1951
- Media type: Print

La Belle Image (1941) is a novel by French writer Marcel Aymé that has been described as "Kafka's Metamorphosis in reverse."

== Composition ==
After France and the United Kingdom declared war on Germany on 3 September 1939, and during the Battle of France, Aymé was in Cape Ferret, but returned to Paris at the end of August. La Belle Image was begun during the summer of 1940 and completed between September and October of that year. Aymé believed that the war would last at least ten years, and his pessimistic mood is apparent throughout the novel.

The work first appeared as a serial in Aujourd'hui, from 15 December 1940 to 14 January 1941, with illustrations by Chas Laborde. It was published by Gallimard towards the end of January 1941.

== Plot ==
La Belle Image is the story of Raoul Cerusier, an upstanding, hard-working, but suspicious businessman, whose dull and unattractive face is transformed into one that is young, handsome, and seductive. His office colleagues no longer recognize him, nor does his wife, whom he must then seduce, thereby cuckolding himself.

== English translations ==
La Belle Image was translated as The Second Face by Norman Denny for the Bodley Head in 1951 and by Sophie Lewis as Beautiful Image for Pushkin Press in 2008; Denny's translation has also appeared under the title The Grand Seduction.

== Film adaptation ==
The book was filmed by Claude Heymann in 1951.

== See also ==
- The Face of Another by Kōbō Abe, a novel with a similar premise
