= Street Without a Name =

1934 film

- Directed by: Pierre Chenal
- Written by: Marcel Aymé (novel); Roger Blin; Pierre Chenal
- Starring: Constant Rémy; Gabriel Gabrio; Paule Andral
- Cinematography: Albert Duverger; Joseph-Louis Mundwiller
- Music by: Paul Devred
- Production company: Pellegrin
- Release date: 2 February 1934
- Running time: 82 minutes
- Country: France
- Language: French

Street Without a Name (French: La Rue sans nom) is a 1934 French drama film directed by Pierre Chenal and starring Constant Rémy, Gabriel Gabrio and Paule Andral. It is based on the 1930 novel La Rue sans nom by Marcel Aymé.

== Cast ==
- Constant Rémy as Méhoul
- Gabriel Gabrio as Fiocle
- Paule Andral as Louise Johannieu
- Paul Azaïs as Manu
- René Bergeron as Schobre
- René Blech
- Roger Blin
- Gérard Dagmar as La Jimbre
- Max Dalban
- Marcel Delaître as Johannieu
- Georges Douking
- Fréhel as La Méhoul
- Enrico Glori as Cruseo
- Pola Illéry as Noa
- Marcel La Montagne as Le cordonnier
- Pierre Labry as Minche
- Pierre Larquey
- Robert Le Vigan as Vanoël
- Charles Lemontier as Cloueur
- Teddy Michaud

== Bibliography ==
- Goble, Alan. The Complete Index to Literary Sources in Film. Walter de Gruyter, 1999.
