= Théâtre de l'Atelier =

Theatre in Paris, France

- Théâtre de Montmartre
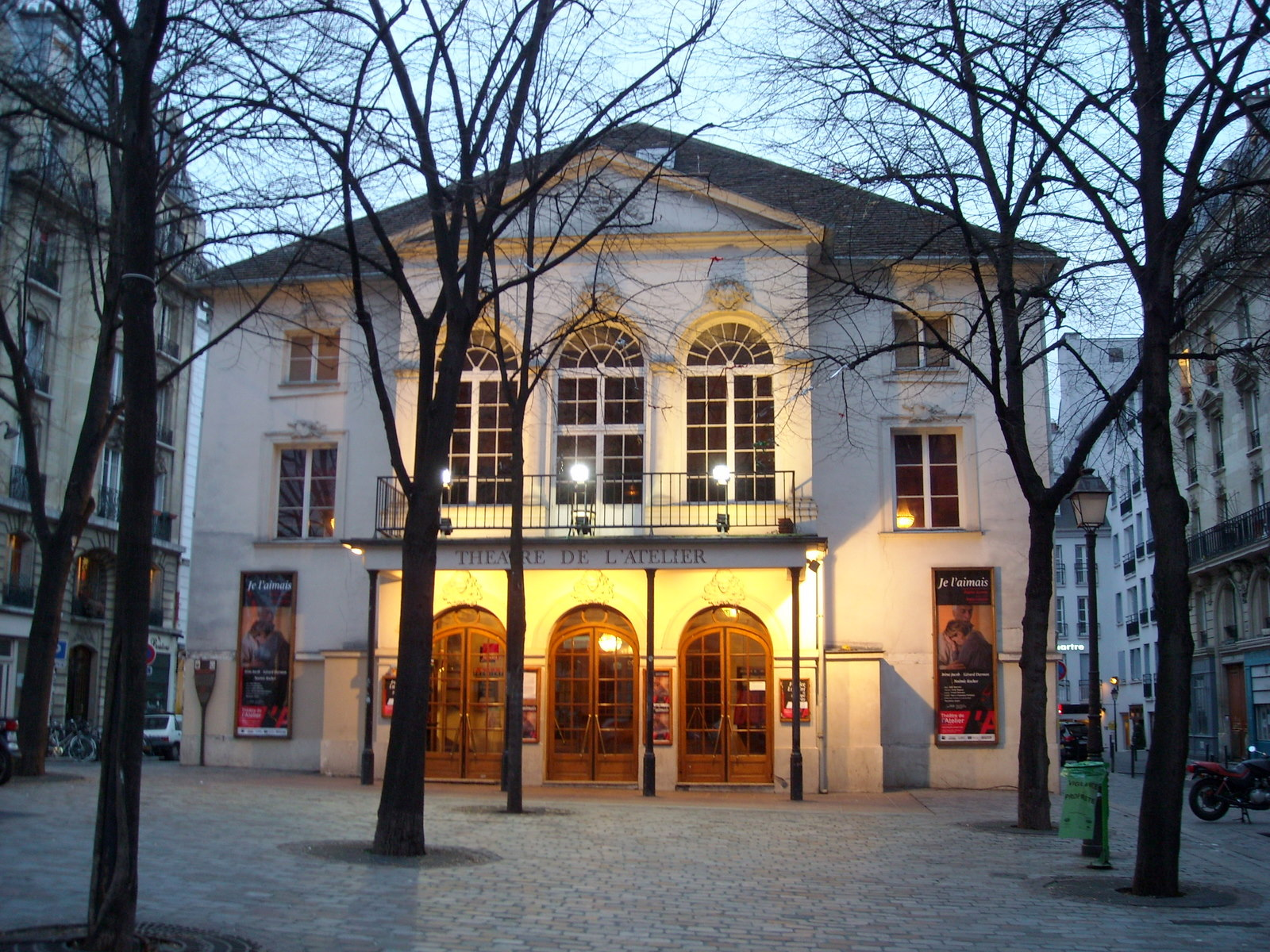
- Façade of the Théâtre de l'Atelier
- Interactive map of Théâtre de l'Atelier
- Address: 1, place Charles Dullin, 18th. Paris; Paris; France
- Coordinates: 48.8834°N 2.3423°E
- Capacity: 563

Construction
- Opened: 1822

Website
- www.theatre-atelier.com

The Théâtre de l'Atelier (French pronunciation: [teɑtʁ də latəlje]) is a theatre at 1, place Charles Dullin in the 18th arrondissement of Paris, France.

== History ==
The theatre opened on 23 November 1822 under the name Théâtre Montmartre. It was one of the first built by Pierre-Jacques Seveste, who held the licence to operate theatres outside the town limits of Paris, and who also built the Théâtre Montparnasse, the Théâtre des Batignolles and the Théâtre de Belleville. Peter Cicéri and Évariste Fragonard did the decoration.

On the death of their parents, brothers Jules Seveste and Edmond Seveste inherited the licence to operate the theatre.

From 1914 to 1922 the building comprised a cinema of 600 seats and operated under the name "Montmartre." In 1922, it returned to its original purpose, and its director and actor Charles Dullin renamed it the Théâtre de l'Atelier.

André Barsacq succeeded Dullin, and led the theatre from 1940 to 1973. He produced the works of Jean Anouilh, Marcel Ayme, Françoise Sagan, René de Obaldia, and Friedrich Dürrenmatt, among others.

From 1973 until December 1998, Pierre Franck took over, along with his wife Danielle Frank. He continued his work as director and maintained high standards in the choice of repertoire with works by Pirandello, Ionesco, Beckett, Thomas Bernhard, Strindberg, and with actors such as Michel Bouquet and Laurent Terzieff.

Laura Pels assumed the leadership in January 1999.

The current capacity is 563 seats. The theatre was classified as a historical monument on 22 March 1965.

== See also ==
- Laura Pels Theatre
