= Rendezvous in July =

1950 film

- Theatrical release poster
- Directed by: Jacques Becker
- Written by: Jacques Becker; Maurice Griffe
- Produced by: René Gaston Vuattoux
- Starring: Daniel Gélin; Brigitte Auber; Nicole Courcel
- Cinematography: Claude Renoir
- Edited by: Marguerite Renoir
- Music by: Jean Wiener
- Production companies: Gaumont; Union Générale Cinématographique
- Distributed by: L'Alliance Générale de Distribution Cinématographique
- Release date: 6 December 1949
- Running time: 112 minutes
- Country: France
- Language: French

Rendezvous in July (French: Rendez-vous de juillet) is a 1949 French comedy film directed Jacques Becker and starring Daniel Gélin, Brigitte Auber and Nicole Courcel. It was entered into the 1949 Cannes Film Festival. It was shot at the Francoeur Studios in Paris. The film's sets were designed by the art director Robert-Jules Garnier. The film was selected for screening as part of the Cannes Classics section at the 2016 Cannes Film Festival. It had its New York premiere in 2018. The New York Times said it was "superabundant in charm, wit and soul".

== Cast ==
- Daniel Gélin as Lucien
- Brigitte Auber as Thérèse
- Nicole Courcel as Christine Courcel
- Pierre Trabaud as Pierrot
- Maurice Ronet as Roger
- Philippe Mareuil as François
- Henri Belly
- Jacques Fabbri
- Michel Barbey
- Francis Maziére as Frédéric
- Robert Lombard
- Jean Pommier
- María Riquelme
- Annie Noël
- Pierre Mondy
- Claude Luter as Chef orchestre

Jazz cornetist Rex Stewart makes a cameo appearance as well.
