= René de Obaldia =

French playwright and poet (1918–2022)

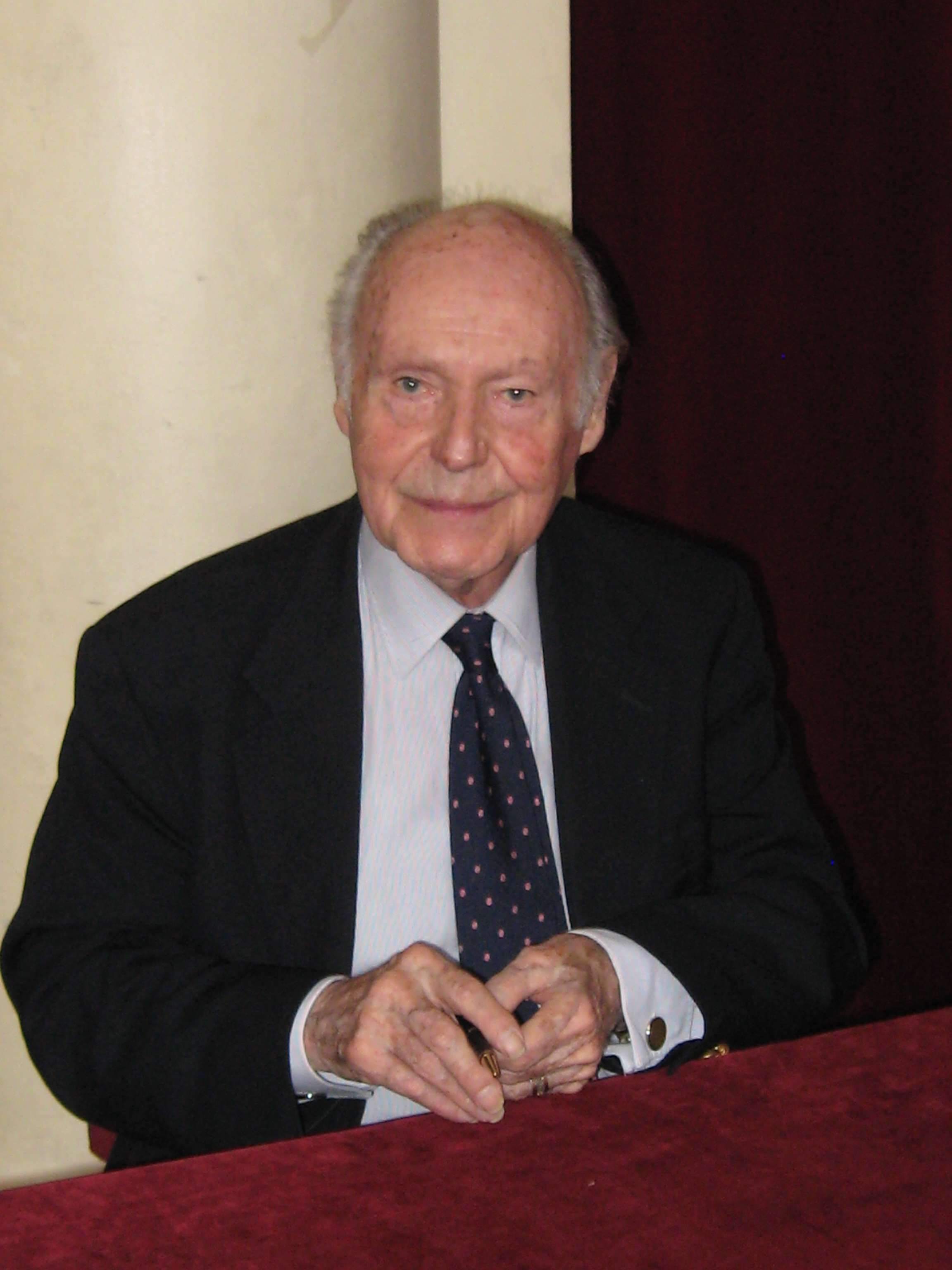
- Born: 22 October 1918; Hong Kong
- Died: 27 January 2022 (aged 103); Paris, France
- Occupations: Author; Playwright; Poet
- Writing career
- Genre: Play

Signature
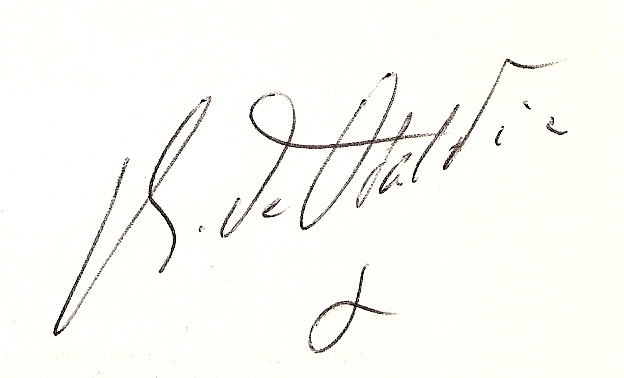

René de Obaldia (22 October 1918 – 27 January 2022) was a French playwright and poet. He was elected to the Académie française on 24 June 1999.

== Biography ==
He was the great-grandson of José Domingo de Obaldía, the second President of Panama. He grew up in Paris, studying at the Lycée Condorcet before being mobilised for the army in 1940. Taken prisoner, he was sent to Stalag VIII-C (in Sagan). He was then sent to the lighter making area in Kransdyhernfurt on 26 June 1940, then to a commando at Auras an der Oder to clear a forest. Even in the worst moments of this ordeal, he kept his special sense of humour. He was repatriated in 1944.

He began his career in 1960, thanks to Jacques Vilar, who presented his first major play, "Génousie," at the Théâtre national populaire. This was followed by Le Satyre de la Villette, with André Barsacq at the Théâtre de l'Atelier, a comedy which ranked him with his literary forebears Jacques Audiberti, Ionesco, Beckett. He was, for more than fifty years, one of the most-produced French playwrights on the planet, as well as the most internationally renowned (having been translated into 28 languages).

Critics have admired the ease of Obaldia's style. His plays always take place within a framework of contemporary times and concern modern subjects, treating these in a comical manner. In La Génousie, for example, Obaldia replaces normal speech (in French) with Genousian, a language of fantasy, dreams, and love.

In 1985 he was awarded the Grand Prix du Théâtre de l’Académie Française.

De Obaldia died in Paris on 27 January 2022, at the age of 103.

== Bibliography ==
- 1949 Midi, poème
- 1952 Les Richesses naturelles, récits-éclairs (Grasset)
- 1955 Tamerlan des cœurs, roman (Grasset)
- 1956 Fugue à Waterloo, récit (Grasset)
- 1956 Le Graf Zeppelin ou La passion d’Émile, récit
- 1959 Le Centenaire, roman (Grasset)
- 1960 Génousie (T.N.P.) (Grasset)
- 1961 Impromptus à loisir (Théâtre de Poche Montparnasse) (Grasset)
- 1962 Le Damné (Prix Italia) (Grasset)
- 1963 Le Satyre de la Villette (Théâtre de l'Atelier) (Grasset)
- 1964 Les larmes de l’aveugle (Grasset)
- 1964 Le Général inconnu (Théâtre de Lutèce) (Grasset)
- 1965 Du vent dans les branches de sassafras (Théâtre Gramont) (Grasset)
- 1965 Le Cosmonaute agricole (Biennale de Paris) (Grasset)
- 1966 L’Air du large (Studio des Champs-Élysées) (Grasset)
- 1966 Obaldia, «Humour secret », choix de textes. Préface by Jean-Louis Bory
- 1967 Urbi et orbi
- 1968 La Rue Obaldia (Théâtre de la Gaîté Montparnasse)
- 1968 … Et la fin était le bang (Théâtre des Célestins à Lyon)
- 1969 Les Innocentines, poèmes pour enfants et quelques adultes (Grasset)
- 1971 La Baby-sitter (théâtre de l’Œuvre) (Grasset)
- 1971 Deux femmes pour un fantôme (théâtre de l’Œuvre) (Grasset)
- 1971 Le Banquet des méduses (Grasset)
- 1972 Petite suite poétique résolument optimiste (Comédie-Française)
- 1973 Underground établissement : Le Damné et Classe Terminale (Théâtre Saint-Roch, Chapelle du Calvaire)
- 1975 Monsieur Klebs et Rosalie (Théâtre de l’Œuvre) (Grasset)
- 1977 Spectacle Obaldia : Le Grand Vizir et Le Cosmonaute agricole (Théâtre du Marais)
- 1977 Grasse matinée (Grasset)
- 1979 Le Banquet des méduses (Théâtre Montansier, Versailles)
- 1980 Soirée René de Obaldia (Centre Georges Pompidou)
- 1980 L’obscur procès de Monsieur Ménard
- 1980 Les Bons Bourgeois (Théâtre Hébertot) (Grasset)
- 1981 Visages d’Obaldia (T.F.1)
- 1984 La Jument du capitaine (Le Cherche-Midi)
- 1986 Endives et miséricorde (Théâtre Mouffetard)
- 1991 Grasse matinée (Théâtre du Marais)
- 1991 Les Larmes de l’aveugle, Richesses naturelles (Théâtre Espace Acteur)
- 1993 Les Innocentines (Théâtre 14) (Grasset)
- 1993 Exobiographie, mémoires (Grasset)
- 1996 Sur le ventre des veuves, recueil de poèmes
- 1996 Soirée Obaldia - Théâtre Molière
- 1999 Obaldiableries : Rappening, Pour ses beaux yeux, Entre chienne et loup (Théâtre 14)
- 2001 Théâtre complet. Réunion en un seul volume des pièces précitées. (Grasset)
