= Saint-Vincent Cemetery =

Cemetery in Paris, France

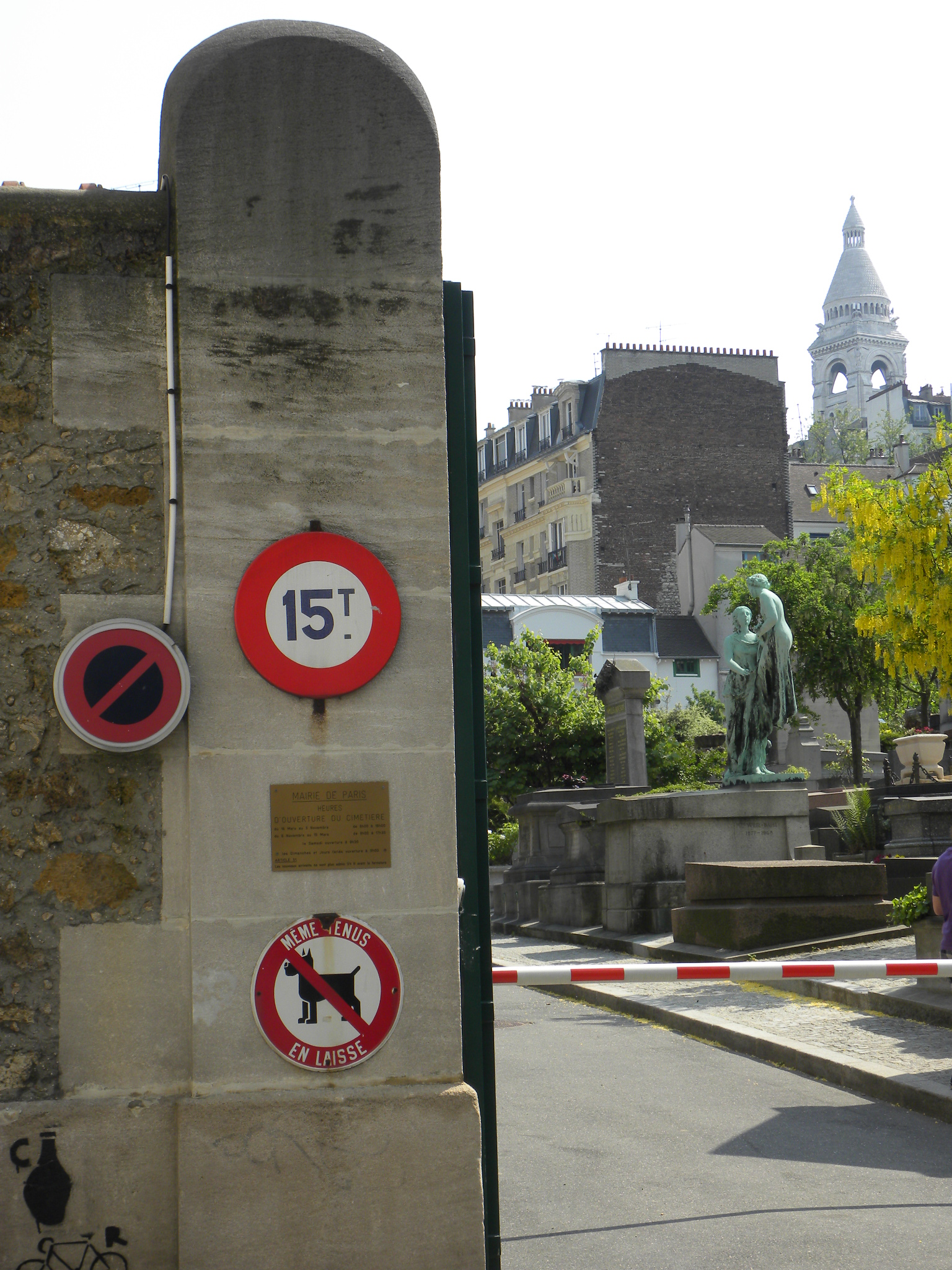
- Entrance of Saint-Vincent Cemetery
- Interactive map of Saint-Vincent Cemetery

Details
- Established: 1831
- Location: Paris, Montmartre
- Country: France
- Coordinates: 48.889°N 2.339°E
- Type: Communal
- Owned by: Mairie de Paris
- Size: > 0.7 hectares (1.7 acres)
- No. of graves: 900

Saint-Vincent Cemetery (French: Cimetière Saint-Vincent) is a cemetery in the 18th arrondissement of Paris.

== History ==
Saint-Vincent Cemetery was opened on January 5, 1831. It was Montmartre's second cemetery, built after the Cimetière du Calvaire had been filled.

== Notable interments ==
- Anouk Aimée (1932–2024), film actress
- Marcel Aymé (1902–1967), writer
- Harry Baur (1880–1943), actor
- Eugène Boudin (1824–1898) painter
- Marcel Carné (1906–1996), film director
- Jules Chéret (1836–1932), master poster designer
- Jean-François Delmas (1861–1933), opera singer
- Suzanne Grandais (1893–1920), actress
- Roland Dorgelès (1885–1973), writer
- Arthur Honegger (1892–1955), composer
- Désiré-Émile Inghelbrecht (1880–1965), composer and orchestra leader
- Kavinsky (1975–2026), musician and disc jockey
- Gen Paul (1895–1975), painter
- Claude Pinoteau (1925–2012), screenwriter and producer
- Paul Sédir (Yvon Le Loup), (1871–1926), writer, philosopher
- Théophile Steinlen (1859–1923) painter
- Maurice Utrillo (1883–1955), painter
- Andrée Vaurabourg (1894–1980), French pianist and teacher

== Location ==
Saint-Vincent Cemetery is located in rue Lucien-Gaulard in the Montmartre Quarter of Paris, France. It is a short walk from the Montmartre Cemetery and near the Sacré-Cœur. The Lapin Agile is located behind the wall, behind the grave of Maurice Utrillo.

The cemetery is a short walk from the Lamarck – Caulaincourt métro station and is serviced by line 12. The nearest railway stations are Gare du Nord and Gare de Pont-Cardinet. The cemetery is also served by bus line 80. There is a Vélib' station at Rue du Coulaincourt (18017).

== Gallery ==
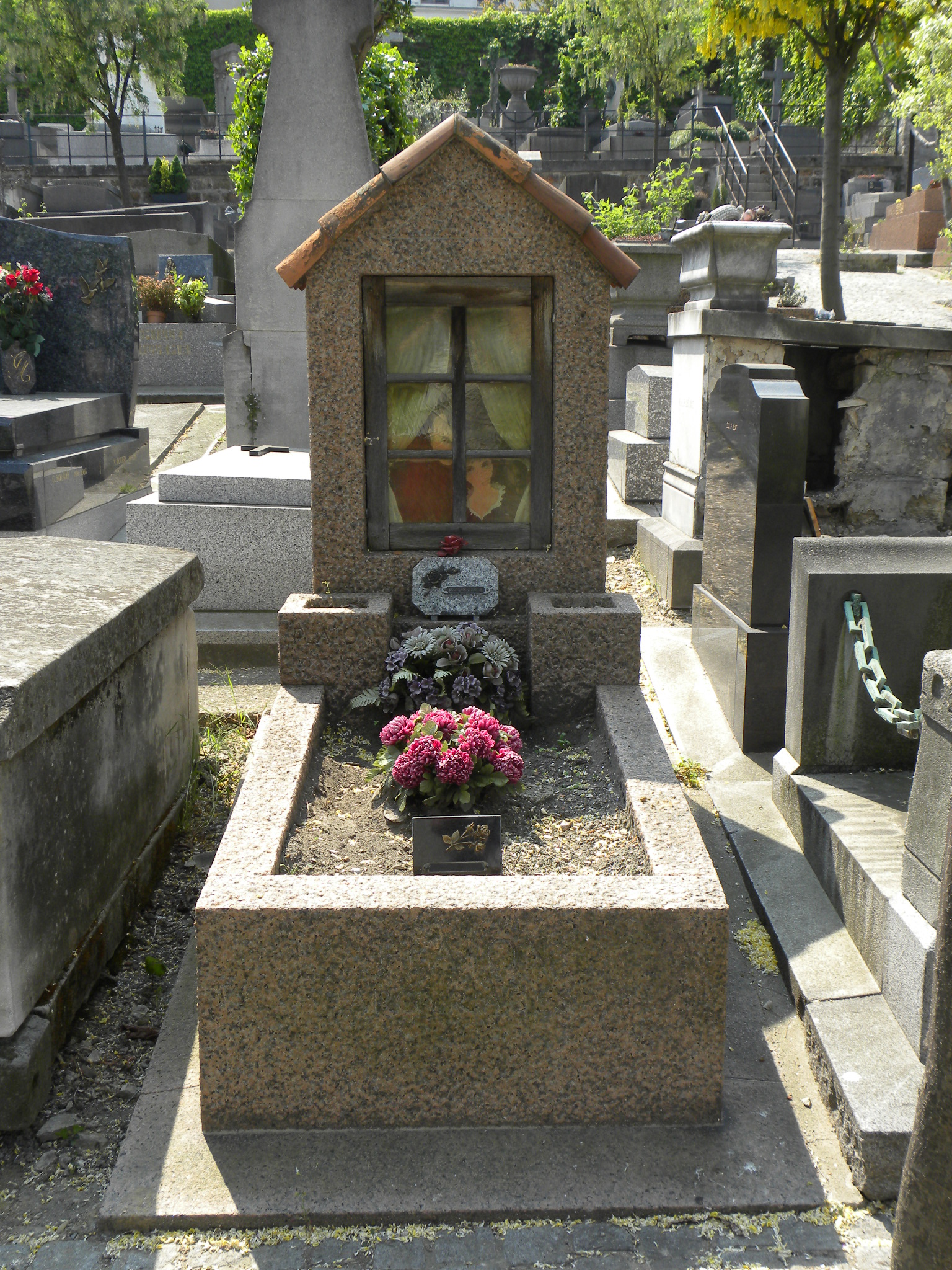
The grave of poets Platon and Papuoe Argyriades

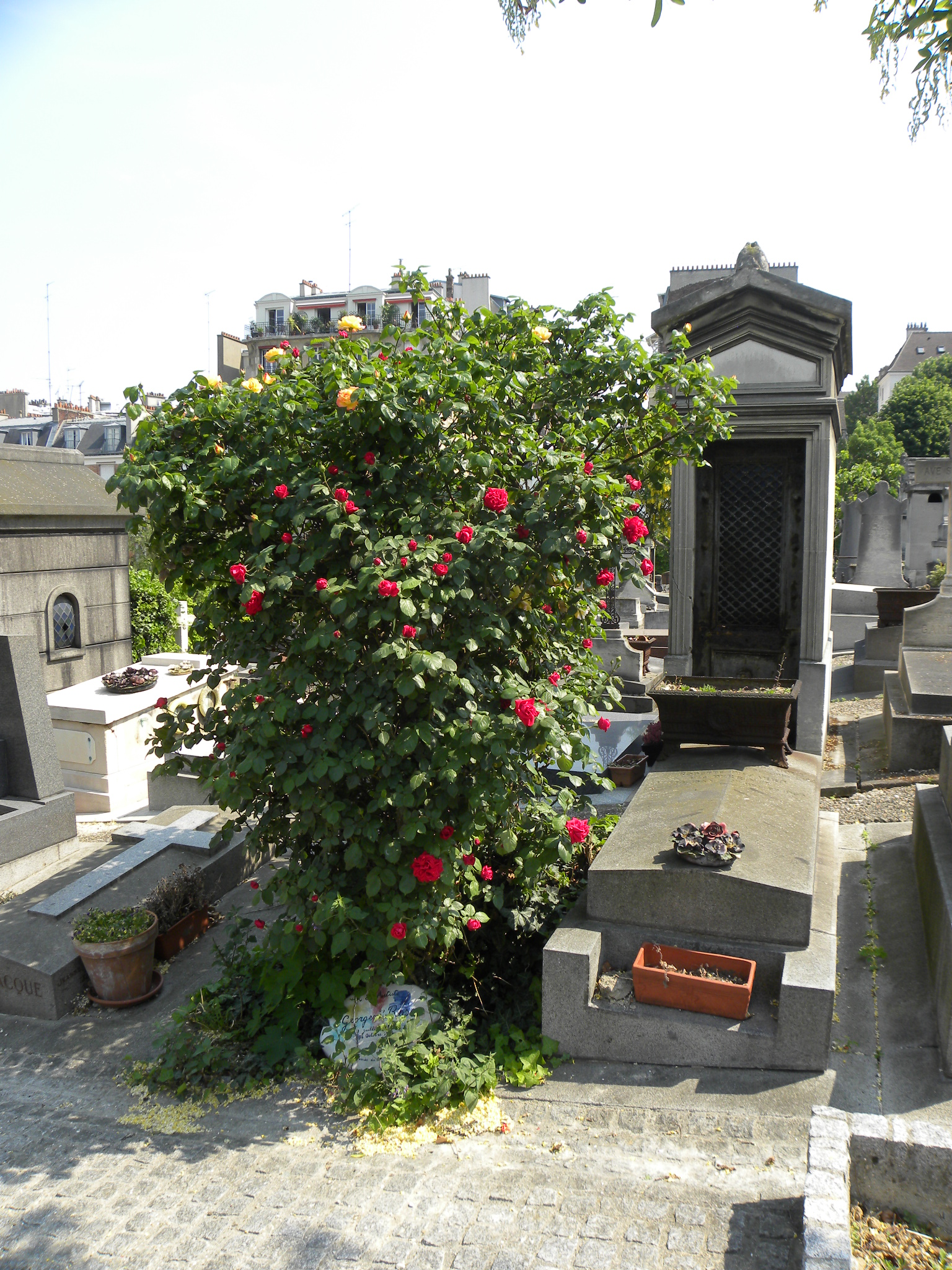
Graves

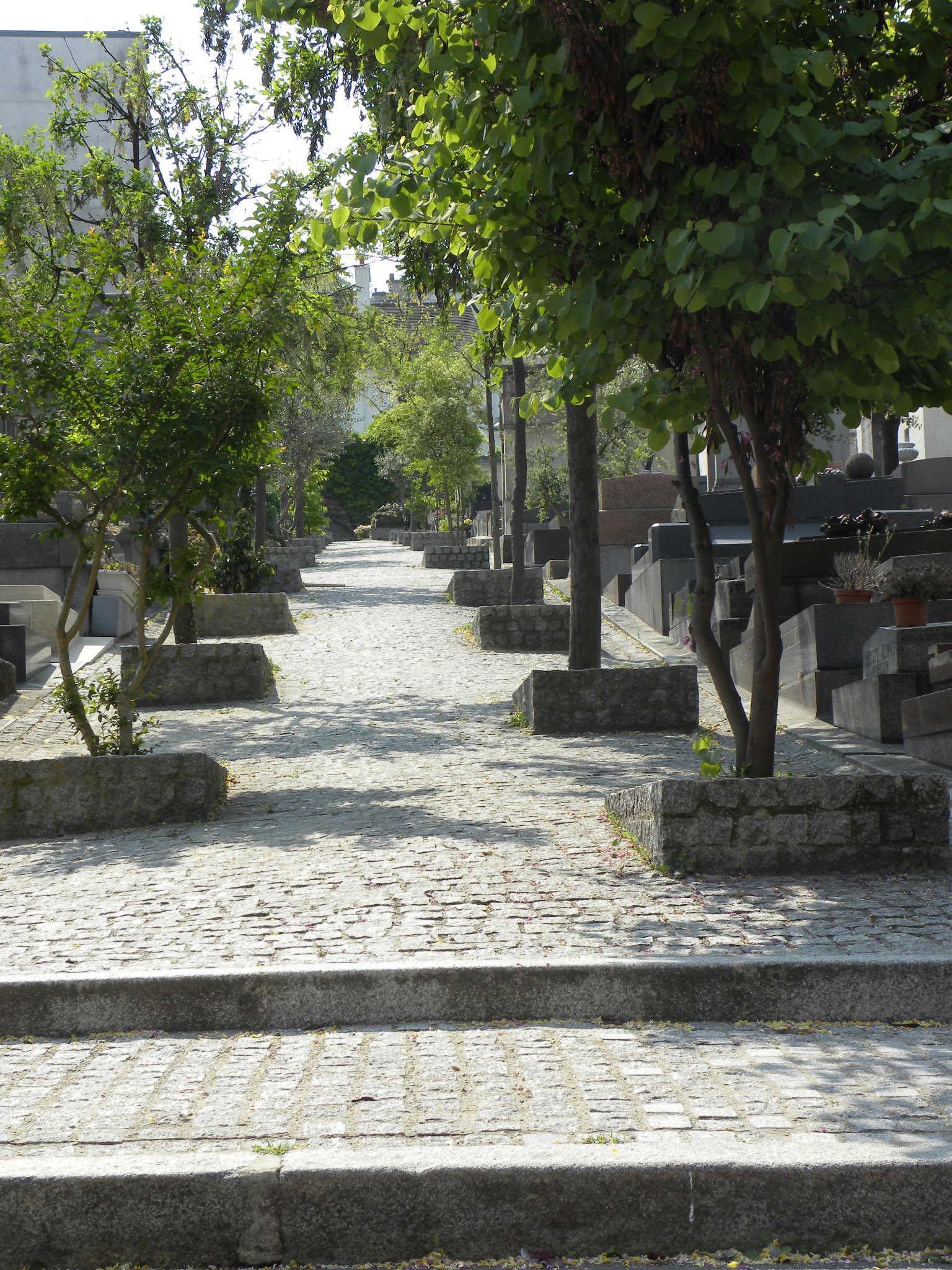
One of the paths through Saint-Vincent Cemetery
