= Le Passe-muraille =

1941 short story by Marcel Aymé

The passer-through-walls (French: Le Passe-muraille), translated as The Man Who Walked through Walls, The Walker-through-Walls or The Man who Could Walk through Walls, is a short story published by Marcel Aymé in 1941.

== Plot summary ==
A man named Dutilleul lives in Montmartre in 1943. In his forty-third year, he discovers that he possesses the ability to pass effortlessly through walls. In search of a cure, he consults a doctor, who prescribes intensive work and medicine. Dutilleul makes no change to his rather inactive life, however, and a year later still retains his ability to pass through walls, although with no inclination to use it. However, a new manager arrives at his office and begins to make his job unbearable. Dutilleul begins using his power to annoy his manager, who goes mad as a result and is taken away to an asylum. Dutilleul then begins to use his ability to burgle banks and jewellery shops. Each time, he signs a pseudonym "The Lone Wolf" in red chalk at the crime scene, and his criminal exploits soon become the talk of the town. In order to claim the prestige and celebrity status "The Lone Wolf" has gained, Dutilleul allows himself to be caught in the act. He is put in prison but uses his ability to frustrate his jailers and repeatedly escape.

He then falls in love with a married woman, whose husband goes out every night and leaves her locked in her bedroom. Dutilleul uses his power to enter her bedroom and spend the night with her while her husband is away. One morning, Dutilleul has a headache and takes two pills he finds in the bottom of his drawer. His headache goes away, but later that night, as he is leaving his lover's house, he notices a feeling of resistance as he is passing through the walls. The pills Dutilleul had thought were aspirin are, in fact, the medicine his doctor had prescribed for him a year earlier. As he is passing through the final outer wall of the property, he notices he is no longer able to move. He realizes his mistake too late. The medicine suddenly takes effect, and Dutilleul ends up trapped in the wall, where he remains to this day.

== Adaptations ==
The story has inspired several cinematic adaptations, including the following:

- 1951 – French comedy farce film Le Passe-muraille, directed by Jean Boyer with Bourvil starring.
- 1959 – German The Man Who Walked Through the Wall, directed by Ladislao Vajda.
- 1977 – French TV film Le Passe-muraille, directed by Pierre Tchernia with Michel Serrault starring.
- 2007 – French short animation film Passe-muraille, directed by Damien Henry.
- 2016 – French TV film fr:Le Passe-muraille (téléfilm, 2016), directed by Dante Desarthe.

The story is also the basis of the 1997 stage musical Le Passe Muraille (and its 2002 English-language adaptation, Amour).

== Gallery ==
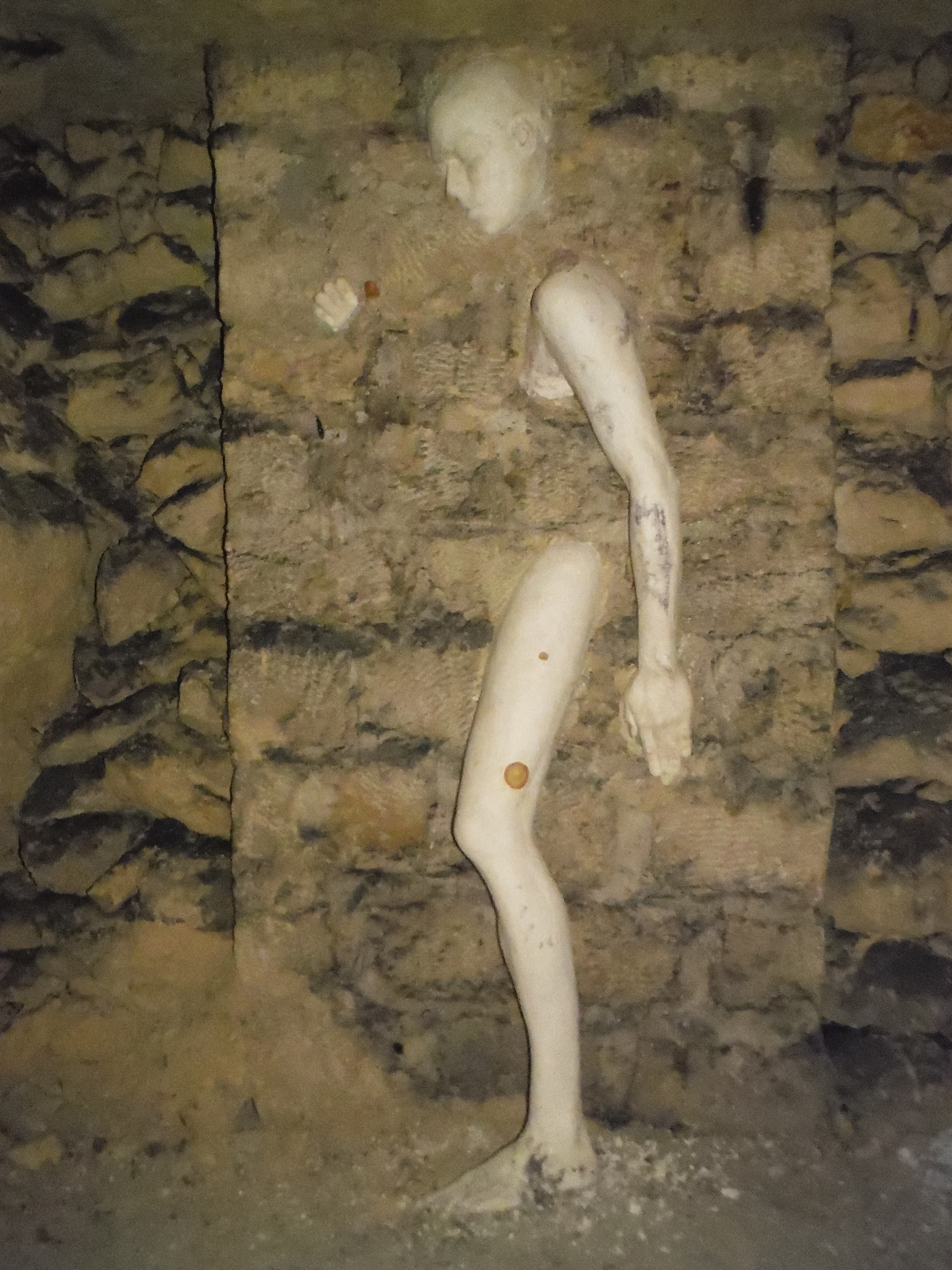
Sculpture based on the story in the Paris catacombs
