= Frédérique Hébrard =

French screenwriter and actress (1927–2023)

Frédérique Hébrard (7 June 1927 – 7 September 2023) was a French screenwriter and actress.

She was born Frédérique Chamson. Her parents were academician André Chamson and Lucie Mazauric, both historians and museum curators. In the film The Hitler Museum, she recounts the transfer of The Mona Lisa from the Louvre Museum to the Château de Chambord in 1940 supervised by her father.

She studied at the Henri-IV high school in Paris then in the high schools of Versailles, Nîmes and Montauban. She then entered the National Conservatory of Dramatic Art in Paris (class of 1949), where her fellow student was Jean Le Poulain.

She took a pseudonym using the last name of her maternal grandmother, Jeannette Hébrard. She began at the Comédie-Française in 1949 in Jeanne la Folle under the direction of Jean Meyer.

She died on 7 September 2023, at the age of 96.

== Filmography ==
=== As an actress ===
- 1950: Le Crime des justes de Jean Gehret : Jeannette
- 1951: Un grand patron d'Yves Ciampi : non créditée
- 1976: Un mari, c'est un mari de Serge Friedman : la femme de Jean Martel
- 1997: Comme des rois de François Velle : la femme du jury

=== As a screenwriter ===
==== Film ====
- 1976: Un mari, c'est un mari, d'après son livre éponyme.

==== Television ====
- 1966: Comment ne pas épouser un milliardaire, en collaboration avec Louis Velle, d'après le roman espagnol de Luisa-Maria Linarès, Sous la coupe de Barbe-Bleue
- 1967: Le Regret de Pierre Guilhem
- 1971: La Demoiselle d'Avignon de Michel Wyn, en collaboration avec Louis Velle (elle est également la voix de la « speakerine » de France Inter)
- 1973: Les Témoins
- 1981: Adieu ma chérie
- 1990: Le Mari de l'ambassadeur
- 1993: Le Château des oliviers
- 1997: Le Grand Batre
- 2010: Les Châtaigniers du désert de Caroline Huppert
