= La Rue sans nom =

1930 novel by Marcel Aymé

- Author: Marcel Aymé
- Language: French
- Genre: Novel
- Publication date: 1930
- Publication place: France

La Rue sans nom is a novel by Marcel Aymé, published in June 1930. It was adapted into a film in 1934 by Pierre Chenal.

== Plot ==
The story focuses on a street in the Parisian banlieue where Italian and French workers reside. Their neighborhood will soon be demolished, but a mysterious character hides himself in this street.

The main themes are xenophobia, poverty, the importance of alcohol, love, madness and aging.

== Film adaptation ==
- Street Without a Name (2 February 1934), directed by Pierre Chenal
