= Village Feud =

1951 film

- Directed by: Henri Verneuil
- Written by: Henri Verneuil; André Tabet
- Based on: The Hollow Field by Marcel Aymé
- Produced by: Adolphe Osso; Edmond Ténoudji
- Starring: Fernandel; Maria Mauban; Andrex
- Cinematography: André Germain
- Edited by: Gabriel Rongier
- Music by: Louiguy
- Production companies: Les Films Marceau; Films Vendôme
- Distributed by: Les Films Marceau
- Release date: 10 October 1951
- Running time: 92 minutes
- Country: France
- Language: French

Village Feud or The Hunting Ground (French: La Table-aux-Crevés) is a 1951 French comedy film directed by Henri Verneuil and starring Fernandel, Maria Mauban and Andrex. It is based on the 1929 novel The Hollow Field by Marcel Aymé. It was filmed at the Marseille Studios and on location in Cabriès in Provence. The film's sets were designed by the art director René Moulaert. It was Verneuil's first feature film after directing a number of shorts.

== Synopsis ==
When the wife of farmer and village politician Urbain Coindet commits suicide, his political rivals all allege that she was really murdered. Meanwhile, Urbain courts the daughter of a local tobacco smuggler who hates him.

== Cast ==
- Fernandel as Urbain Coindet
- Maria Mauban as Jeanne Gari
- Andrex as Frédéric Gari
- Antonin Berval as Le père Gari
- René Génin as Le curé
- Fernand Sardou as Forgeral
- Alexandre Arnaudy as Miloin
- Marcel Charvey as Rambarde
- Jenny Hélia as La Cornette
- Jeanne Mars as Une commère
- Mado Stelli as Louise
- Marthe Marty as Heloise Miloin
- Edmond Ardisson as Cugue
- Max Mouron as Le Corne
- Cambis as Un client du bistrot
- Manuel Gary as Felicien Berger
- Henri Vilbert as Victor
- Édouard Delmont as Capucet

== Bibliography ==
- Goble, Alan. The Complete Index to Literary Sources in Film. Walter de Gruyter, 1999.
- Oscherwitz, Dayna & Higgins, MaryEllen. The A to Z of French Cinema. Scarecrow Press, 2009.
- Rège, Philippe. Encyclopedia of French Film Directors, Volume 1. Scarecrow Press, 2009.
