= Gen Paul =

French painter

- Born: Eugène Paul; July 2, 1895; Montmartre, France
- Died: April 30, 1975; Paris, France
- Occupation: Painter

Gen Paul (July 2, 1895 – April 30, 1975) was a French painter and engraver.

== Biography ==
Born as Eugène Paul in a house in Montmartre on the Rue Lepic painted by Van Gogh, he began drawing and painting as a child. His father died when he was only ten years old and Gen Paul was trained to work in decorative furnishings. He served in the French army during World War I and was wounded twice, losing one of his legs. During his convalescence, he returned to painting, and at Le Bateau-Lavoir he became friends with Juan Gris who helped him a great deal. Although Paul never received any formal training, he made a living from his art for almost 60 years. While his early works reflected the influences of his friends in Montmartre, Vlaminck, Utrillo and Frank Will, he soon developed dynamic form of expressionism reflecting influences as varied as Toulouse-Lautrec, Van Gogh, Cézanne, Goya, Velázquez and El Greco. Between 1925 and 1929, he produced many of his best works. The paintings during this phase are characterized by motion created by gestural brush strokes, daring compositions, forced perspectives, diagonals, zigzags, juxtaposed areas of abstraction and realism and flat areas of color. Unlike other expressionists of the time such as Soutine, Rouault and the German expressionists, Gen Paul's works are full of optimism – fueled by his passion for life and daily life and his desire to overcome his handicap. Due to the dynamism and motion inherent in his paintings, some consider Paul to be the first action painter, a precursor to the abstract expressionists of the 1950s.

Paul died at the Pitié-Salpêtrière Hospital in Paris on 30 April 1975 and was interred in the Cimetière Saint-Vincent in Montmartre. A great many of his works remain in private hands but a number of his important pieces can be found at museums in France and in other parts of Europe.

=== Career ===
Paul first exhibited at the Salon d’Automne and the Salon des Indépendants in Paris in 1920. In 1928, his works were exhibited with those of Pablo Picasso and Chaïm Soutine. Paul began the 1930s with a serious addiction to alcohol, further complicating his chronic health problems. The paintings of 1930s reflect a more somber mood with precise lines and carefully chosen colors and an emphasis of rhythm over motion. From the 1940s through his death, Paul reverted to a style of action painting characterized by many of the elements of his work in the 1920s, but his later work never again succeeded in recapturing the innovation, emotion and expressionism of his earlier works.

In 1934, he was recognized for his contributions to France and was awarded the Legion of Honor. In 1937, he was contracted to paint a large fresco for the Pavilion of Wines of France at the Paris International Exposition.

In addition to painting scenes from his native Montmartre, including that of his friends, composer Darius Milhaud, writer Louis Ferdinand Celine, Paul travelled to the United States where he painted jazz and classical musicians, a subject with which he had much interest.
