= Uranus (novel) =

Novel by Marcel Aymé

1967 edition (publ. Livre de Poche)

Uranus (translated as The Barkeep of Blémont) is a French novel by Marcel Aymé published in 1948. It is the third book in a trilogy which covers the pre-war, war, and post-war periods in France. The first is Travelingue (1948), set in the time of the Front Populaire; the second is Le Chemin des écoliers (1946), set during the occupation. The third book, Uranus, focuses on post-war France and the purge: the social cleansing which sought to discipline collaborators. People were shaved, humiliated, beaten, and often killed without a fair trial.

The true hero of the book, who is also the victim, is Léopold – owner of a coffee shop who discovers his passion for Jean Racine and for Andromaque thanks to lessons which, due to bombings of the school, must now take place in his establishment.

The novel was adapted as a film, Uranus by Claude Berri in 1990. Le Chemin des écoliers was adapted as the film Way of Youth by Michel Boisrond in 1959.
