= The Green Mare (film) =

1959 film by Claude Autant-Lara

La jument verte
- Directed by: Claude Autant-Lara
- Written by: Jean Aurenche; Pierre Bost (adaptation & dialogue)
- Based on: (It is based on the novel) (The Green Mare by); Marcel Aymé
- Produced by: Moris Ergas
- Starring: Bourvil; Francis Blanche; Sandra Milo; Yves Robert
- Cinematography: Jacques Natteau
- Edited by: Madeleine Gug
- Music by: René Cloërec
- Color process: Eastmancolor
- Production companies: Raimbourg; S.O.P.A.C. Société Nouvelle des Établissements Gaumont; Star Presse; Zebra Films
- Distributed by: Gaumont Distribution
- Release date: 29 October 1959
- Running time: 93 minutes
- Countries: France; Italy
- Language: French

The Green Mare (French: La jument verte) is a 1959 French comedy-drama historical film directed by Claude Autant-Lara and starring Bourvil, Francis Blanche, Sandra Milo and Yves Robert. The story is set during the latter half of the 19th century and follows two feuding peasant families. It is based on the novel The Green Mare by Marcel Aymé.

The film premiered on 29 October 1959. It had 5,294,328 admissions in France.

== Plot ==
The story is set during the latter half of the 19th century and follows two feuding peasant families. During the Franco-Prussian War (1870), a neighbor betrays Ernest Haudouin to the Prussians. Captain Prussian wills Jument Verte to arrest Haudouin.

== Cast ==
- Bourvil as Honoré Haudouin
- Francis Blanche as Ferdinand Haudouin
- Sandra Milo as Marguerite Maloret
- Yves Robert as Zèphe Maloret
- Julien Carette as Philibert (as Carette
- Valérie Lagrange as Juliette Haudouin
- Marie Déa as Anaïs Maloret
- Guy Bertil as Toucheur
- Mireille Perrey as La mère Haudouin
- Georges Wilson as Jules Haudouin
- Amédée as Ernest Haudoin, le fils
- Marie Mergey as Adélaïde Haudoin
- Claude Sainlouis as Noël Maloret
- Nicole Mirel as Aline
- Hans Verner as Le sous-officier prussien (as Jean Verner)
- Michel Bardinet as Le peintre
- Martine Havet as Mouton
- Benoîte Labb as Hélène Haudoin
- Ernest Varial as Le feldwebel qui viole la mère Haudoin
- François Nocher as Frédéric Maloret
- Achille Zavatta as Déodat - le facteur

== See also ==
- List of French films of 1959
