= Chit of a Girl =

1938 novel

- Author: Georges Simenon
- Original title: La Marie du port
- Translator: Geoffrey Sainsbury
- Language: French
- Publisher: Nouvelle Revue Française
- Publication date: 1938
- Publication place: France
- English publication date: 1949
- Media type: Print
- Pages: 219

Chit of a Girl (French: La Marie du port) is a 1938 novel by the Belgian writer Georges Simenon. It is a stand-alone novel by Simenon, best known for his long running Inspector Maigret series. It was first translated and published in English in 1949.

== Publication history ==
La Marie du port ("Marie of the Port") was published by the Nouvelle Revue Française, Paris, in 1938. It was translated into English as Chit of a Girl by Geoffrey Sainsbury and published by Routledge and Kegan Paul, London, in 1949. It was republished as Girl in Waiting by Pan Books, London, in 1957. The English editions were bound with Justice, a translation of another Simenon novel Cour d'Assises.

== Synopsis ==
Following the death of a fisherman in the Normandy port of Port-en-Bessin his relatives gather for the burial. Amongst them is his eldest daughter Odile who became estranged with her family after taking up with her lover Chatelard who owns a restaurant and cinema in Cherbourg. He becomes intrigued by Marie, Odile's younger sister, who proves to be cold and calculating. Just as Odile has abandoned her dreams of going to Paris to open a shop, Marie is intrigued by the kind of escape he seems to offer if she becomes his lover.

== Adaptation ==
In 1950 it was adapted into a French film La Marie du port directed by Marcel Carné and starring Jean Gabin, Blanchette Brunoy and Nicole Courcel.

== Bibliography ==
- Driskell, Jonathan. Marcel Carne. Manchester University Press, 2016.
- Goble, Alan. The Complete Index to Literary Sources in Film. Walter de Gruyter, 1999.
