= Julie Andrieu =

French presenter

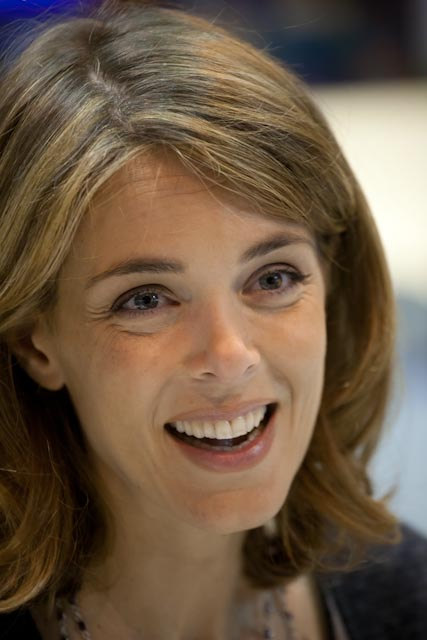
- Andrieu in 2012
- Born: 27 February 1974 (age 51); Paris, France
- Occupations: Television presenter; radio presenter; food critic
- Years active: 1992–present
- Spouse: Stéphane Delajoux (m. 2010)
- Children: 2
- Mother: Nicole Courcel
- Relatives: Marc Levy (cousin); Cathy Andrieu (cousin)
- Website: julieandrieu.com

Julie Andrieu (French pronunciation: [ʒyli ɑ̃dʁijø]; born 27 February 1974) is a French television and radio presenter and food critic.

== Biography ==
Andrieu was born in Paris, the daughter of actress Nicole Courcel, married to a man much younger than her and who abandoned her during her pregnancy. She and her mother lived for a year with Jean-Pierre Coffe, who was a close friend. She has a half-brother and a half-sister from her father's side. She is also the cousin of writer Marc Levy and actress Cathy Andrieu.

She started her career at age 18 as a photographer for France Soir. At age 20, she learnt to prepare small dishes to please her partner, the photographer Jean-Marie Périer. She published in 1999 her first cookbook titled La Cuisine de Julie and became in 2000 a food critic for the Guide Lebey.

Since 2001, she has hosted several radio and television programs on cooking:

- Tout un plat, program on channel Téva, 2001
- Votre table, program on radio RMC Info, 2002
- Julie autour du monde, program on channel Cuisine+, 2003
- Julie cuisine, daily program on channel TF1, 2004–05
- Droit dans le buffet, weekly program on radio Europe 1, 2005
- Fourchette & Sac à Dos, weekly program on channel France 5, 2007
- Côté cuisine, daily program on channel France 3, 2009
- Les carnets de Julie, weekly program on channel France 3, 2012

Since September 2009, she has been a food columnist in the daily television program C à vous presented by Alessandra Sublet on France 5, preparing almost every evening a recipe during the show. In 2012, she replaced Alessandra Sublet during her pregnancy by hosting the program every Friday.

She also collaborates on the weekly television magazine Télé 7 Jours for the rubric À table. She has published a number of books of recipes and cooking advice, created her own website and produced several television programs titled, such as Julie chez vous, where she visits individuals to make an inventory of their closets, advise and develop a recipe with the material they have.

== Personal life ==
Andrieu married French neurosurgeon Stéphane Delajoux in August 2010. She gave birth to a boy on 26 October 2012. In September 2015, she announced expecting her second child, and gave birth to a girl on 16 December 2015.

== Selected works ==
- Julie cuisine le monde, Alain Ducasse, November 2011
- Comment briller aux fourneaux sans savoir faire cuire un œuf, Agnès Viénot, April 2010
- Carnet de correspondances. Mes accords de goûts, Agnès Viénot, April 2009
- Julie chez vous, Marabout, September 2008
- Confidences sucrées (in collaboration with Pierre Hermé), Agnès Vienot, October 2007
- Mes secrets pour garder la ligne... sans régime, Robert Laffont, March 2007
- Le B.A.-ba du chocolat, Marabout, October 2006
- Julie cuisine avec 3 fois rien, Albin Michel, March 2006
- Julie cuisine pour garder la ligne, Albin Michel, March 2006
- Julie cuisine en quelques minutes, Albin Michel, October 2005
- Julie cuisine à l'avance, Albin Michel, October 2005
- Ma p'tite cuisine, Marabout, April 2005
- Les Cantines de Julie, Parigramme, October 2004
- Le Canard de Julie, Marabout, October 2003
- La Cuisine expliquée à ma mère, Albin Michel, October 2002
- Tout cru, Albin Michel, May 2001
- La Cuisine de Julie, Albin Michel, 1999

=== Guides ===
- Lebey des restaurants de Paris, Albin Michel, 2005
- Petit Lebey des bistrots, Albin Michel, 2005
- Lebey des restaurants italiens de Paris, Albin Michel, 2004
- Le Guide du club des croqueurs de Chocolat, Stock, 1998
