= Louis Velle =

French actor (1926–2023)

- Born: Louis André Charles Marie Velle; 29 May 1926; 3rd arrondissement of Paris (France)
- Died: 3 February 2023; Morainvilliers (France)
- Occupations: Actor, writer

Louis Velle (29 May 1926 – 2 February 2023) was a French actor. He appeared in numerous films including Stopover in Orly, The Impossible Mr. Pipelet, and Kings for a Day.

== Personal ==
Louis Velle was married since 1949 to writer, director, actress and novelist Frédérique Hébrard, with whom he lived for over 70 years and with whom he has three children, Catherine, Nicolas and François, director and screenwriter.

He died on 2 February 2023 at the age of 96.

== Filmography ==
=== Feature films ===
1951: Marriage agency of Jean-Paul Le Chanois

1953: The Three Musketeers by André Hunebelle

1953: A boy's life by Jean Boyer

1954: The Eye behind the scenes by André Berthomieu

1954: I had seven daughters by Jean Boyer

1954: Stopover at Orly by Jean Dréville

1955: The Impossible Monsieur Pipelet by André Hunebelle

1955: The Best Part of Yves Allégret

1956: The Joyful Prison by André Berthomieu

1956: The Inspector loves the fight by Jean Devaivre

1957: The Quiet Corner by Robert Vernay

1961: Over the Wall by Jean-Paul Le Chanois

1962: Because, because of a woman by Michel Deville

1964: Among the Vultures (Unter geiern) by Alfred Vohrer

1966: Martin soldier by Michel Deville

1968: The Unfaithful Night by Antoine d'Ormesson

1971: La Poudre d'escampette by Philippe de Broca

1972: The Angels by Jean Desvilles

1973: Jean Girault 's driving license

1974: The walls have ears by Jean Girault

1975: Intrepid by Jean Girault

1975: When the City Awakens by Pierre Grasset

1976: A husband is a husband by Serge Friedman

1985: Kikuo Kawasaki 's Private Passions

1987: Duo solo by Jean-Pierre Delattre (unreleased in theaters)

1996: Like Kings by François Velle

=== Short films ===
1972: The Line of Seals by Jean-Paul Torok

1996: Bitumen by François Velle

=== Television ===
1958: Snow Hotel by Jean Vernier

1962: Just published by Édouard Bourdet, directed by André Pergament

1963: Things see by André Pergament

1964: Subscriber to line U by Yannick Andréi: Monsieur Roux

1965: How Not to Marry a Billionaire by Roger Iglésis: Robert de Gissac (television adaptation of the novel by Spanish author Luisa-Maria Linarès: Sous la coupe de Barbe-Bleue ).

1966: The blue train stops 13 times by Serge Friedman, episode: Beaulieu, the trap

1966: The Happy Age of Odette Joyeux: Frédéric Aubry

1970: The Thursdays of Madame Giulia (I giovedi della signora Giulia): Luciano Barsanti[6]

1972: La Demoiselle d'Avignon by Michel Wyn: François Fonsalette

1972: The Man Who Returns from afar by Michel Wyn based on the novel by Gaston Leroux

1972: The 16th at Kerbriant by Michel Wyn: Captain Franz Madelin

1973: Docteur Caraïbes by Jean-Pierre Decourt (+ short version theatrically released): title role

1974: Laurels for Lila by Claude Grinberg

1979: The Strange Mr. Duvallier by Victor Vicas

1982: The Lys in the Valley by Fabrice Maze based on the novel by Honoré de Balzac: Monsieur de Mortsauf

1988 : The Happiness Opposite by Teff Erhat (episode 24)

1990 : The Ambassador 's Husband by François Velle : Pierre-Baptiste Lambert

1993 : The Castle of Olive Trees by Nicolas Gessner

1997 : Le Grand Batre by Laurent Carceles

2005 : We only lend to the rich by Arnaud Sélignac

2006 : The Secrets of the Volcano by Michaëla Watteaux

2010 : Chestnuts of the Desert by Caroline Huppert

=== At the theater tonight ===
1969: The Love of the Four Colonels by Peter Ustinov, adapted by Marc-Gilbert Sauvajon, directed by Jean-Pierre Grenier, directed by Pierre Sabbagh, Théâtre Marigny

1972: Scrap metal and rags by Garson Kanin, directed by Pierre Mondy, directed by Pierre Sabbagh, Théâtre Marigny

1972: Eve and the Men by Gabriel Arout, directed by Bernard Dhéran, directed by Pierre Sabbagh, Théâtre Marigny

1979: Nina by André Roussin, directed by Jean-Laurent Cochet, directed by Pierre Sabbagh, Théâtre Marigny

1980: Ninotchka by Melchior Lengyel, adapted by Marc-Gilbert Sauvajon, directed by Jacques Ardouin, directed by Pierre Sabbagh, Théâtre Marigny

=== Voice-over ===
1964: 1989 by Roger Leenhardt (short film): Narrator

1964: The Archives of France by Henri Calef (short film): Narrator

1971: In war as in war (Le eccitanti guerre di Adeline) by Bernard Borderie: Narrator

==== Dubbing ====
1968: Bullitt: Senator Walter Chalmers (Robert Vaughn)

=== Radio ===
1982: Chloé by Jérôme Touzalin.

=== Theater ===
==== Playwright ====
1956: At the Pope 's Currency by Louis Velle, directed by René Dupuy, Théâtre Gramont

1959: Mousseline by Louis Velle, directed by the author, Théâtre Fontaine

1967: The Sentimental Life of Louis Velle, directed by Michel Fagadau, Théâtre des Ambassadeurs

=== Actor ===
1946: The Holy Family by André Roussin, directed by Jean Meyer, Théâtre Saint-Georges

1948: The Revenge of a Russian Orphan by Henri Rousseau, directed by René Dupuy, Théâtre de l'Œuvre

1949: The Revenge of a Russian Orphan by Henri Rousseau, directed by René Dupuy, Studio des Champs-Elysées

1949: L'Habit vert by Gaston Arman de Caillavet and Robert de Flers, directed by Pierre Aldebert, Théâtre de Chaillot

1952: Vice-Versa by Louis Velle, Fontaine Theater

1953: Hamlet de Tarascon by Jean Canolle, directed by Christian-Gérard, Théâtre La Bruyère

1954: The Love of the Four Colonels by Peter Ustinov, directed by Jean-Pierre Grenier, Théâtre Fontaine

1959: Mascarin by José-André Lacour, directed by Jean Négroni, Théâtre Fontaine

1959: Mousseline by Louis Velle, directed by the author, Théâtre Fontaine

1960: Histoire de rire by Armand Salacrou, directed by Jean Meyer, Théâtre de la Madeleine

1960: My father was right by Sacha Guitry, directed by André Roussin, Théâtre des Célestins

1963: Laure and the Jacques by Gabriel Arout, directed by Jean Piat, Saint-Georges Theater

1963: Six Men in Question by Frédéric Dard & Robert Hossein, directed by Robert Hossein, Théâtre Antoine

1963: You Can Never Say by George Bernard Shaw, directed by René Dupuy, Théâtre Gramont

1965: La Crécelle by Charles Dyer, directed by Michel Fagadau, Théâtre des Célestins, Georges Herbert tour

1966: Tonight in Samarkand by Jacques Deval, directed by Jean Piat, Théâtre de Paris

1967: The Sentimental Life of Louis Velle, directed by Michel Fagadau, Théâtre des Ambassadeurs

1973: The Arc de Triomphe by Marcel Mithois, directed by Jacques Charon, Saint-Georges Theater

1976: Nina by André Roussin, directed by Jean-Laurent Cochet, Théâtre des Nouveaux

1978: Nina by André Roussin, directed by Jean-Laurent Cochet, Théâtre des Célestins, Karsenty-Herbert tour

1992: The Girl in the Back Seat by Bernard Slade, directed by Jacques Sereys, Antoine Theater

1995: The Absence of War by David Hare, directed by Daniel Benoin, Comédie de Saint-Étienne

1995: The Rubicon by Maurice Horgues, directed by Daniel Delprat, Boulogne-Billancourt Theater

2002: Festen by Thomas Vinterberg, directed by Daniel Benoin, National Theater of Nice

2003: Festen by Thomas Vinterberg, directed by Daniel Benoin, Théâtre du Rond-Point

2004: Festen by Thomas Vinterberg, directed by Daniel Benoin, National Theater of Nice, Theater La Criée

=== Director ===
1959: Mousseline by Louis Velle, Fontaine Theater Sentimental Life, Antoine Theater.

=== Publications ===
Louis Velle is co-author, with his wife Frédérique Hébrard of:

- The Lady of Avignon, 1971
- The Protestant and the Catholic, 1999 (memorabilia)
- As long as there are cats... in a family, 2010
- The young lady of Avignon is back, 2014

Louis Velle is also the author of the books:

- Triumph in the Stock Market Despite Hard Times, 1989 (Le Rocher)
- Ma petite femme, 1953 (Éditions La Bougie du Sapeur, taken over in club edition by France Loisirs), Prix Alphonse-Allais
