= The Beautiful Image =

1951 French film by Claude Heymann

- Directed by: Claude Heymann
- Written by: Jean Ferry; Claude Heymann
- Based on: The Beautiful Image by Marcel Aymé
- Produced by: André Aron; Alain Poiré
- Starring: Frank Villard; Françoise Christophe; Pierre Larquey
- Cinematography: Lucien Joulin
- Edited by: Claude Nicole
- Music by: Louis Beydts
- Production company: Gaumont
- Distributed by: Gaumont Distribution
- Release date: 30 May 1951
- Running time: 90 minutes
- Country: France
- Language: French

The Beautiful Image (French: La belle image) is a 1951 French drama film directed by Claude Heymann and starring Frank Villard, Françoise Christophe and Pierre Larquey. The film's sets were designed by the art director Robert Hubert. It was based on the 1941 novel of the same title by Marcel Aymé.

== Synopsis ==
The face of a modest, quiet man unexpectedly changes one day into a handsome, vigorous one. He becomes a swaggering womaniser who none of his former acquaintances recognise. He even seduces his own wife in his new personae.

== Cast ==
- Frank Villard as Raoul Cérusier / Roland Colbert
- Françoise Christophe as Renée Cérusier
- Pierre Larquey as L'oncle Antonin
- Suzanne Flon as Lucienne Chenal
- Robert Dalban as Julien Gauthier
- Junie Astor as La Sarrazine
- Olivier Hussenot as Le commissaire
- Arlette Merry as La concierge
- Gilberte Géniat as Annette, la bonne
- Made Siamé as Mlle Lagorce
- René Clermont as L'homme aux cochons d'Inde
- Paul Faivre as L'employé du bureau B.C.B.
- Ariane Murator as L'employée du bureau B.C.B.
- Roland Armontel as Le pharmacien
- Jacques Beauvais as Le maître d'hôtel
- Paul Bisciglia
- Louis Bugette as Le chauffeur de taxi
- Claude Castaing
- Jean-Jacques Duverger as Jacquot
- Gilbert Edard
- Lucien Guervil as L'inspecteur
- Harry-Max
- Gilbert Sauval as Le clochard
- Titys as Un employé

== See also ==
- The Second Face (1950)
- The Man with My Face (1951)
- The Face of Another (1966)

== Bibliography ==
- Frey, Hugo. Louis Malle. Manchester University Press, 2004.
