= La Marie du port =

Marie of the Port
- Theatrical poster
- Directed by: Marcel Carné
- Written by: Georges Ribemont-Dessaignes; Jacques Prévert; Marcel Carné; Louis Chavance
- Based on: La Marie du port by Georges Simenon
- Produced by: Sacha Gordine
- Starring: Jean Gabin; Blanchette Brunoy; Nicole Courcel
- Cinematography: Henri Alekan
- Edited by: Léonide Azar
- Music by: Joseph Kosma
- Color process: Black and white
- Production company: Films Sacha Gordine
- Distributed by: Les Films Corona
- Release date: 15 March 1950
- Running time: 97 minutes
- Country: France
- Language: French

La Marie du port (Marie of the Port) is a 1950 French crime drama film directed by Marcel Carné and starring Jean Gabin, Blanchette Brunoy and Nicole Courcel. The screenplay was written by Georges Ribemont-Dessaignes and Jacques Prévert, based on the 1938 novel of the same title by Georges Simenon. The music score is by Joseph Kosma and the cinematography by Henri Alekan. It was made at the Saint-Maurice Studios in Paris and on location around Cherbourg in Normandy. The film marked a comeback for Carné after the poor reception of his previous film Gates of the Night in 1946 and several subsequent unsuccessful attempts to launch projects.

== Plot ==
Henri, owner of a busy brasserie and cinema in Cherbourg, takes the easy-going Odile who lives with him to the funeral of her father in Port-en-Bessin. The two are bored with each other. He waits for her in a café where he is taken with a new waitress called Marie, unaware that she is Odile's tough little sister. He buys an old trawler in Port-en-Bessin, which he visits often to oversee its restoration and to pursue Marie. She has a young admirer called Marcel who gets drunk and is knocked down by Henri's car. Henri takes the lad to his apartment in Cherbourg, where Odile can look after him. One day the provocative Marie turns up at Cherbourg, tantalising Henri but not giving in. Tired of trying to seduce her, he takes her to Marcel's room, where they find Odile in bed with him. Disgusted with all three, Marie gets a bus home. A phone call from there about his boat warns Henri that Marie has been threatening to throw herself into the sea. He drives over in haste and she tells him she can in fact swim like a fish. As a last effort at winning her, he slips the keys to his business into her victorious hand.

== Reception ==
The film had a significant impact on Gabin's star personae, shifting from the doomed man established in pre-war Poetic Realism to the more mature, assured and powerful figure he would make his hallmark over the next two following decades. The contemporary American version was significantly edited and is noticeably shorter.

== Cast ==
- Jean Gabin as Henri Châtelard
- Blanchette Brunoy as Odile Le Flem
- Nicole Courcel as Marie Le Flem
- Claude Romain as Marcel Viaud
- Louis Seigner as Jules Pincemin - le premier oncle (as Louis Seigner de la Comédie Française)
- René Blancard as Dorchain - le capitaine du chalutier
- Robert Vattier as Le client de la brasserie mécontant
- Louise Fouquet as La prostituée
- Olivier Hussenot as Le deuxième oncle
- Jeanne Véniat as Madame Blanc
- Georges Vitray as Monsieur Josselin - le patron du café
- Odette Laure as Françoise
- Martial Rèbe as Le commissaire-priseur (as Martial Rebe)
- Germaine Michel as LMadame Pincemin - la première tante
- Charles Mahieu as Le coiffeur
- Gabrielle Fontan as Une Commère
- Yvonne Yma as La voisine
- Marie-Louise Godard as La deuxième tante (as M.L. Godart)
- Émile Drain as Le médecin
- Jane Marken as Madame Josselin - la patronne du bar (as Jeanne Marken)
- Julien Carette as Thomas Viau

== Bibliography ==
- Driskell, Jonathan. Marcel Carne. Manchester University Press, 2016.
- Harriss, Joseph. Jean Gabin: The Actor Who Was France. McFarland, 2018.
- Turk, Edward Baron. Child of Paradise: Marcel Carné and the Golden Age of French Cinema. Harvard University Press, 1989
- Witt, Michael. Jean-Luc Godard, Cinema Historian. Indiana University Press, 2013.
