= Nicole Courcel =

French actress

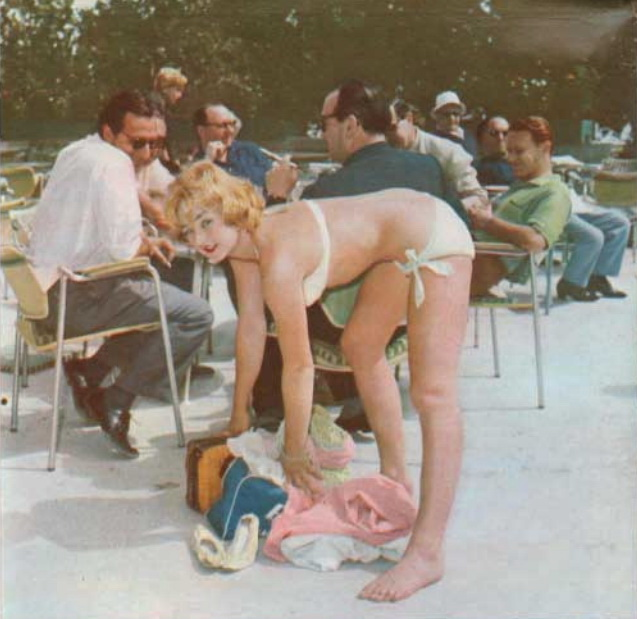
- Born: Nicole Marie Jeanne Andrieu; 21 October 1931; Saint-Cloud, Hauts-de-Seine, France
- Died: 25 June 2016 (aged 84); Paris, France
- Occupation: Actress
- Years active: 1947–2004
- Children: Julie Andrieu

Nicole Marie Jeanne Andrieu (21 October 1931 – 25 June 2016), better known as Nicole Courcel, was a French actress who achieved popularity through the 1950s and 1960s.

== Life and career ==
She was born in Saint-Cloud, in the western suburbs of Paris. After working as an extra in a few films, she won a major role in Rendez-vous de juillet (1949), with Brigitte Auber. Although she has been described as being not well-known outside of France, she appeared in more than 40 films between 1947 and 1979, having notable parts in La Marie du port (1950, opposite Jean Gabin), Sacha Guitry's Royal Affairs in Versailles (1954), and La Sorcière (1956, opposite Marina Vlady), and is perhaps best known for her role in Serge Bourguignon's Sundays and Cybele (1962). In 1970 she turned to television, appearing in different television films and miniseries, in which she continued to work until 2004.

== Partial filmography ==
- Antoine and Antoinette (1947) - (uncredited)
- Les amoureux sont seuls au monde (1948) - (uncredited)
- To the Eyes of Memory (1948) - Une élève du cours Simon (uncredited)
- Rendezvous in July (1949) - Christine Courcel
- La Marie du port (1950) - Marie Le Flem
- The Lovers of Bras-Mort (1951) - Monique Levers
- Gigolo (1951) - Dominique
- Les amours finissent à l'aube (1953) - Léone Fassler
- Royal Affairs in Versailles (1954) - Madame de Chalis
- Le collège en folie (1954) - Lydia
- The Big Flag (1954) - Madeleine
- Women Without Hope (1954) - Maria
- Vice Dolls (1954) - Véronique Gaudin
- Papa, maman, la bonne et moi (1954) - Catherine Liseray
- Huis clos (1954) - Olga
- Papa, maman, ma femme et moi (1955) - Catherine Langlois
- La Sorcière (1956) - Kristina Lundgren
- Women's Club (1956) - Nicole Leroy
- The Case of Doctor Laurent (1957) - Francine
- The Inspector Likes a Fight (1957) - Hélène Davault
- The Bear's Skin (1957) - Anne-Marie Ledrut
- La belle et le tzigane (1958) - Georgina Welles
- The Man Who Walked Through the Wall (1959) - Yvonne Steiner - eine Französin
- Testament of Orpheus (1960) - La mère maladroite / The Young Mother (uncredited)
- Tomorrow Is My Turn (1960) - Florence
- Les amours de Paris (1961) - Nicole Lasnier
- Amazons of Rome (1961) - Lucilla - Porcenna's Wife
- Vive Henri IV... vive l'amour! (1961) - Jacqueline de Bueil
- Les petits drames (1961) - Yvonne
- Konga Yo (1962) - Marie
- Sundays and Cybele (1962) - Madeleine
- Delay in Marienborn (1963) - Nurse Kathy
- Nick Carter and Red Club (1965) - Dora Beckmann
- Les ruses du diable (Neuf portraits d'une jeune fille) (1966) - La patronne de la guinguette
- Les Créatures (1966) - (uncredited)
- The Night of the Generals (1967) - Raymonde
- L'étrangleur (1970) - Claire, la prostituée
- L'aventure c'est l'aventure (1972) - Nicole
- Le Rempart des béguines (1972) - Tamara
- Un officier de police sans importance (1973) - Fabienne
- The Slap (1974) - Madeleine
- Thomas (1975) - Florence, la mère
- L'esprit de famille (1979) - Hélène Moreau
