= Kings for a Day =

1997 film

- Directed by: François Velle
- Written by: Mariusz Pujszo; François Velle
- Produced by: Ludi Boeken; Gene Rosow; Nicolas Velle
- Starring: Stéphane Freiss
- Cinematography: Hugues de Haeck
- Edited by: Corinne Lapassade
- Music by: Vasile Șirli
- Release date: 11 June 1997
- Running time: 95 minutes
- Country: France
- Language: French

Kings for a Day (French: Comme des rois) is a 1997 French comedy film directed by François Velle. It was entered into the 20th Moscow International Film Festival.

== Premise ==
Two Ignoramus accidentally become famous due to case of mistaken identity.

== Cast ==
- Stéphane Freiss as Edek
- Mariusz Pujszo as Roman
- Maruschka Detmers as Elizabeth
- Louis Velle as Kurt
- Thierry Lhermitte as The Producer
- Marie-Christine Adam as The Journalist
- Jacques Sereys as Botteret
- Pauline Macia as Gisèle
- Betty Bomonde as La starlette
- Christian Bujeau as Tom
- Jesse Joe Walsh as Bob Gore
