= Marcel Aymé =

French writer (1902–1967)

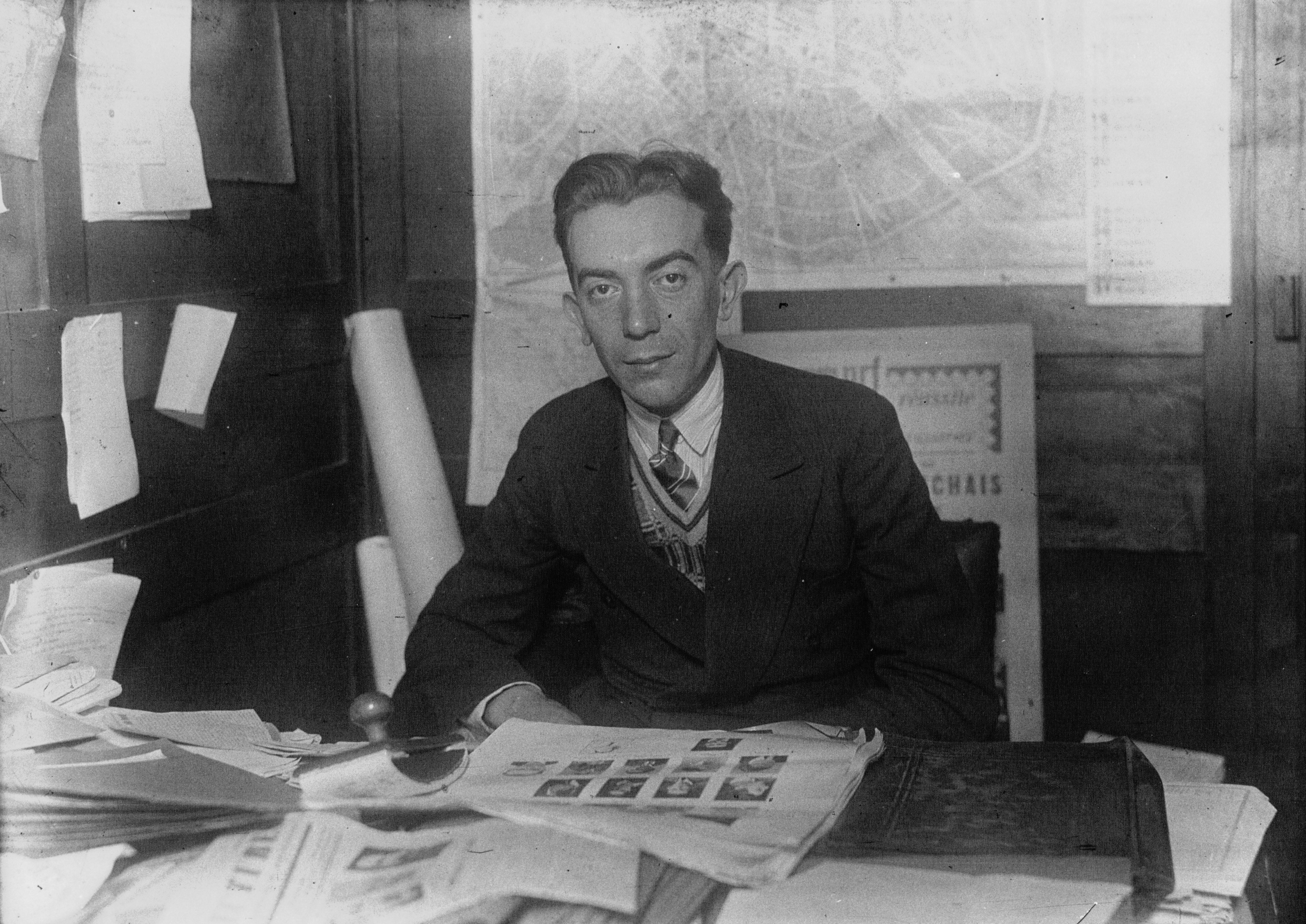
- Aymé in 1929
- Born: Marcel André Aymé; 29 March 1902; Joigny
- Died: 14 October 1967 (aged 65); Paris
- Resting place: Cimetière Saint-Vincent
- Education: Collège de l'Arc (Dole)
- Occupations: Author and dramatist
- Spouse: Marie-Antoinette Arnaud
- Writing career
- Language: French
- Notable works: La Jumente verte Le Passe-muraille
- Notable awards: Prix Renaudot

Marcel Aymé (French pronunciation: [maʁsɛl ɛme]; 29 March 1902 – 14 October 1967) was a French novelist and playwright, who also wrote screenplays and works for children.

== Biography ==
Marcel André Aymé was born in Joigny, in the Burgundy region of France, the youngest of six children. His father, Joseph, was a blacksmith, and his mother, Emma Monamy, died when he was two years old, after the family had moved to Tours. Marcel was sent to live with his maternal grandparents in the village of Villers-Robert, a place where he would spend the next eight years, and which would serve as the model for the fictitious village of Claquebue in what is perhaps the most well-known of his novels, La Jument verte. In 1906 Marcel entered the local primary school. Because his grandfather was a staunch anti-clerical republican, he was looked down upon by his classmates, many of whose parents held more traditional views. Accordingly, Marcel was not baptized before reaching the age of eight, nearly two years after the death of his grandfather in 1908. Orphaned once more when his grandmother died two years later, he briefly lived with other family members before moving to Dole, a small town of the Franche-Comte region, to stay with an aunt and attend the Collège de l'Arc, where he demonstrated more ability in mathematics than in literature. His years at school there were an unpleasant experience he would never look back on fondly.

Despite ongoing issues with his health that had begun when he was a child, Aymé was able to perform his military service, which began in 1919, as part of an artillery unit in the occupied Rhineland. In 1923 he moved to Paris where he worked unsuccessfully at a bank, an insurance company, and as a journalist. Though he failed in his career as a reporter, his stint at the newspaper allowed him to discover his love of writing.

His first published novel was Brûlebois (1926), and in 1929 his La Table aux crevés won the Prix Renaudot. After the great success of his novel La Jument verte (1933), translated into English as The Green Mare, he concentrated mostly on writing and publishing children's stories, novels, and collections of stories. In 1935 he also started writing movie scripts. In theatre, Marcel Aymé found success with his plays Lucienne et le boucher, Clérambard (1949), a farce, and Tête des autres (1952), which criticized the death penalty.

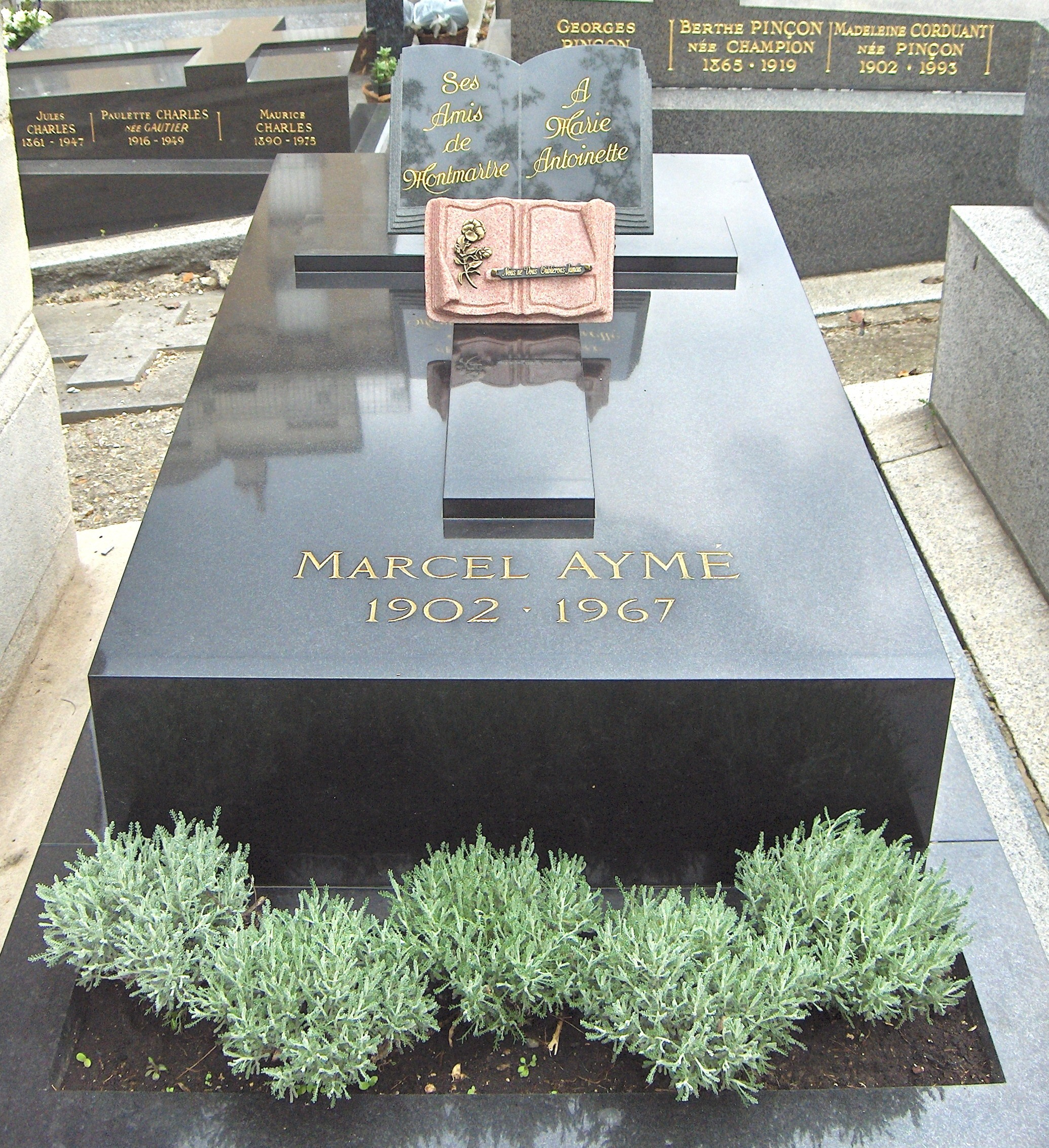
Marcel Aymé's grave. Cimetière Saint-Vincent, Paris.

He died in 1967 and was buried in the Cimetière Saint-Vincent in the Montmartre Quarter of Paris.

== Work ==
One of Aymé's most famous short stories is Le passe-muraille or "The Walker-Through-Walls". At the age of 43, Dutilleul suddenly discovers that he has "the remarkable gift of being able to pass through walls with perfect ease". What begins as a novelty that gives him pleasure ends up pushing Dutilleul toward ever more sinister pursuits.

== Legacy ==
Visitors to Paris can see a monument in his honour at Place Marcel-Aymé, in the Montmartre Quarter. The statue is based on his short story "Le passe-muraille" ("The Walker through Walls").

== Bibliography ==
=== Novels ===
- 1926 Brûlebois
- 1927 Aller Retour
- 1928 Les Jumeaux du diable
- 1929 La Table aux crevés (translated as The Hollow Field)
- 1930 La Rue sans nom
- 1931 Le Vaurien
- 1933 La Jument verte (translated as The Green Mare)
- 1935 Maison basse (translated as The House of Men)
- 1936 Le Moulin de la Sourdine (translated as The Secret Stream)
- 1937 Gustalin
- 1939 Le Bœuf clandestin
- 1941 La Belle image (variously translated as The Second Face, The Grand Seduction, and Beautiful Image)
- 1941 Travelingue (novel translated as The Miraculous Barber)
- 1943 La Vouivre (translated as The Fable and the Flesh)
- 1946 Le Chemin des écoliers (novel translated as The Transient Hour)
- 1948 Uranus (novel translated as The Barkeep of Blémont)
- 1960 Les Tiroirs de l'inconnu (novel translated as The Conscience of Love)

=== Short story collections ===
==== French ====
- 1932 Le Puits aux images (contains, in addition to the title story, "La Retraite de Russie," "Les Mauvaises Fièvres," "Noblesse," "A et B," "Pastorale," "Les Clochards," "L'Individu," "Au clair de la lune," "La Lanterne," "Enfants perdus")
- 1934 Le Nain (contains, in addition to the title story, "La Canne," "La Liste," "Deux victimes," "Rue Saint-Sulpice," "Bonne vie et mœurs," "L'Affaire Touffard," "Le Mariage de César," "Trois faits divers," "L'Armure," "Sporting," "La Clé sous le paillasson," "Le Dernier")
- 1934-1946 Les Contes du chat perché (translated as The Magic Pictures and The Wonderful Farm)
- 1938 Derrière chez Martin (contains "Le Romancier Martin," "Je suis renvoyé," "L'Élève Martin," "Le Temps mort," Le Cocu nombreux," "L'Âme de Martin," "Rue de l'Évangile," "Conte de Noël," "La Statue")
- 1943 Le Passe-muraille (contains, in addition to the title story, "Les Sabines," "La Carte," "Le Décret," "Le Proverbe," "Légende poldève," "Le Percepteur d'épouses," "Les Bottes de sept lieues," "L'Huissier," "En attendant")
- 1947 Le Vin de Paris (contains, in addition to the title story, "L’Indifférent," "La Traversée de Paris," "La Grâce," "Dermuche," "La Fosse aux péchés," "Le Faux Policier," "La Bonne Peinture")
- 1950 Les Bottes de sept lieues
- 1950 En arrière (contains, in addition to the title story, "Oscar et Erick," "Fiançailles," "Rechute," "Avenue Junot," "Les Chiens de notre vie," "Conte du milieu," "Josse," "La Vamp et le Normalien," "Le Mendiant")
- 1967 Enjambées (first posthumous collection contains seven stories, all of which appeared earlier except for "La Fabrique")
- 1987 La fille du shérif

==== English ====
- 1958 Across Paris and Other Stories
- 1961 The Proverb and Other Stories (contains, in addition to the title story, "Three News Items," "Knate," "The Retreat from Moscow," "Josse," "Backwards," "The Boy Martin," "The Life-Ration," "The Bogus Policeman," "Couldn't-Care-Less," "La Bonne Peinture," "The Last")
- 1972 The Walker-through-walls and Other Stories
- 2012 The Man Who Walked through Walls (contains, in addition to the title story, "Sabine Women," "Tickets on Time," "The Problem of Summertime," "The Proverb," "Poldevian Legend," "The Wife Collector," "The Seven-League Boots," "The Bailiff," "While Waiting")

=== Plays ===
- 1948 Lucienne et le boucher (Lucienne and the Butcher)
- 1950 Clérambard translated by Norman Denny
- 1951 Vogue la galère (adapted into a a film in 1973)
- 1952 La tête des autres (Other People's Heads)
- 1954 Les quatre vérités
- 1954 Les sorcières de Salem (The Salem Witches, adapted from The Crucible by Arthur Miller)
- 1955 Les oiseaux de lune (The Moon Birds)
- 1957 La mouche bleue (The Blue Fly)
- 1957 Vu du pont
- 1961 Louisiane
- 1961 Les Maxibules (The Maxibules)
- 1963 La consommation
- 1963 Le placard (The Wall Cupboard)
- 1965 La nuit de l'iguane (The Night of the Iguana, adapted from The Night of the Iguana by Tennessee Williams)
- 1966 La convention Belzébir (The Belzébir Convention)
- 1967 Le minotaure

=== Screenwriter ===
- Crime and Punishment (dir. Pierre Chenal, 1935)
- The Green Domino (dir. Herbert Selpin and Henri Decoin, 1935)
- The Mutiny of the Elsinore (dir. Pierre Chenal, 1936)
- Portrait of Innocence (dir. Louis Daquin, 1941)
- The Suitors Club (dir. Maurice Gleize, 1941)
- Strange Inheritance (dir. Louis Daquin, 1943)
- Madame et le Mort (dir. Louis Daquin, 1943)
- Papa, maman, la bonne et moi] (dir. Jean-Paul Le Chanois, 1954)
- Papa, maman, ma femme et moi (dir. Jean-Paul Le Chanois, 1955, a sequel)
- Your Money or Your Life (dir. Jean-Pierre Mocky, 1966)

== Filmography ==
- Street Without a Name, directed by Pierre Chenal (1934, based on the novel La Rue sans nom)
- Mr. Peek-a-Boo, directed by Jean Boyer (1951, based on the short story The passer-through-walls)
- The Beautiful Image, directed by Claude Heymann (1951, based on the novel La Belle image)
- La Table aux crevés, directed by Henri Verneuil (1951, based on the novel The Hollow Field)
- La Traversée de Paris, directed by Claude Autant-Lara (1956, based on the short story Traversée de Paris)
- Way of Youth, directed by Michel Boisrond (1959, based on the novel Le Chemin des écoliers)
- The Man Who Walked Through the Wall, directed by Ladislao Vajda (West Germany, 1959, based on the short story The passer-through-walls)
- The Green Mare, directed by Claude Autant-Lara (1959, based on the novel The Green Mare)
- Le Nain, directed by Pierre Badel (1961, TV film, based on the short story Le Nain)
- La Bonne Peinture, directed by Philippe Agostini (1967, TV film, based on the short story La Bonne Peinture)
- Le Boeuf clandestin, directed by Jacques Pierre (1969, TV film, based on the novel Le Boeuf clandestin)
- Clérambard, directed by Yves Robert (1969, based on the play Clérambard)
- Vogue la galère, directed by Raymond Rouleau (1973, based on the play Vogue la galère)
- Le Passe-muraille, directed by Pierre Tchernia (1977, TV film, based on the short story The passer-through-walls)
- La Grâce, directed by Pierre Tchernia (1979, TV film, based on the short story La Grâce)
- La Vouivre, directed by Georges Wilson (1989, based on the novel La Vouivre)
- Uranus, directed by Claude Berri (1990, based on the novel Uranus)
- Les Bottes de sept lieues, directed by Hervé Baslé (1990, TV film, based on the short story Les Bottes de sept lieues)
- L'Huissier, directed by Pierre Tchernia (1991, TV film, based on the short story L'Huissier)
- The Favour, the Watch and the Very Big Fish, directed by Ben Lewin (1991, based on the short story Rue Saint-Sulpice)
- Les jours où je n'existe pas, directed by Jean-Charles Fitoussi (2002, based on the short story Le Temps mort)
- Le Boeuf clandestin, directed by Gérard Jourd'hui (2013, TV film, based on the novel Le Boeuf clandestin)
- Le Passe-muraille, directed by Dante Desarthe (2016, TV film, based on the short story The passer-through-walls)

== See also ==
- List of French writers
