= Norman Denny =

English writer and translator

Norman George Denny (26 May 1901 – 12 April 1982), also known under the pseudonyms Norman Dale and Bruce Norman, was an English writer and translator.

== Early life ==
He was born in Catford Kent, to Henry and Edith Denny. Henry was a mining engineer born in Bathurst, New South Wales Australia, travelled to England where he married Edith Mare youngest daughter of a shipbroker, in Lewisham in the summer of 1899. They had three children, Norman - the eldest and two daughters Veronica and Enid. His father Henry was tragically killed in a motor accident in Canada in 1938 whilst his mother, who had qualified in 1923 as a nurse at University College Hospital died in Maida Vale London in 1957.
Norman had lived for two years in Mexico City where his father had become a mining consultant, before returning to England where he lived until his death. He was educated at Radley College, in Paris, and in Vienna.

== Career ==
Denny wrote many short stories and novels under different names, but he is perhaps best remembered for his numerous French to English translations, in particular for Hugo's Les Misérables, in 1976, though he has been criticized for abridging the text. He also translated works by Marcel Aymé, André Maurois, Charles Perrault, Jean Renoir, Georges Simenon, Teilhard de Chardin, and Michel Tournier. Most of his translations were from French, but he also translated several German books, such as Hotel Adlon: the life and death of a great hotel,(1958), and The Dancing Bear: A novel by Edzard Schaper (1960), published by The Bodley Head, a publishing house he worked closely with.

== Family ==
He married an Anglican vicar's daughter Gillian Watts in September 1935 at the parish church Kings Heath Birmingham, officiated by her father, The Reverend Harold Sellon Watts. They moved to Salt Lane Hambledon Godalming Surrey and had three children, Christine, Michael, and Nicholas. He joined the RNVR London Division in 1937, Gazetted a Lieutenant in 1940. Post-war they moved to a farm Little Doccombe near Moretonhampstead in Devon where his wife died in 1972. He moved to Sussex and died at 72 New Church Road Hove.

== List of published Books ==
Books by Norman Denny

- The Serpent & the Dove (1938) - John Lane (publisher) London
- Sweet Confusion: A Novel (1947) - Michael Joseph (publisher)
- The Yellow Book (1949) a selection (Edited),The Bodley Head
- Arrival in Wycherly (1951) - Dodd, Mead & Co.
- Story in Half-Light (1954) - Cresset Press, London
- The Bayeux Tapestry: The Story of the Norman Conquest (1966) with Josephine Fillmore Sandy - HarperCollins

Books under his pseudonym Norman Dale (Children’s books)

- Secret Service (1943) - The Bodley Head
- Dangerous Treasure (1944) - The Bodley Head, republished in the US as The Six Stone Faces (1960)
- The Best Adventure (1945) - John Lane/The Bodley Head
- The Secret Motorcar (1954) - The Bodley Head
- The Exciting Journey (1947) - The Bodley Head
- Mystery Christmas (1948) - The Bodley Head
- Skeleton Island (1949) - John Lane/The Bodley Head, which form a trilogy
- Clockwork castle : a novel for boys and girls (1952) - John Lane/The Bodley Head
- The Valley of the Snake (1953) - John Lane/The Bodley Head
- The Casket and the Sword (1955) - Barrie
- The Clock that Struck Fifteen (1956) - Hamish Hamilton
- Johnnie-by-the-River (1957) - Hamish Hamilton
- The Medenham Carnival (1957) - Hamish Hamilton
- All Change for Medenham (1959) - Hamish Hamilton
- The Pied Piper of Medenham 1959) - Hamish Hamilton
- A Medenham Secret (1962) - Hamish Hamilton
- The House Where Nobody Lived (1958) - Hamish Hamilton
- The Game that Really Happened (1959) - Hamish Hamilton
- Look at Farms (1960) - Hamish Hamilton
- Workbook (1963)
- The House in Cobble Lane (1964) - Hamish Hamilton

== Book translations ==
Victor Hugo, Les Misérables: Volume 1 & 2 (1976) and Waterloo
Michel Tournier, Friday, or, The Other Island (Vendredi ou les Limbes du Pacifique 1967)
Georges Simenon, Red Lights (Feux rouges 1953) - with intro by Anita Brookner, and The Watchmaker (L'horloger d'Everton 1954)
Marcel Aymé, The Wonderful Farm (1934), The Green Mare (1933), Across Paris and Other Stories (1957)
André Maurois, Prometheus: The life of Balzac (1965)
Petru Dumitriu, Incognito (1962)
Christine de Rivoyre, The Tangerine (1958)
Pierre Teilhard de Chardin, The Future of Man (1946)
