= List of French films of 1950 =

French films released in 1950

A list of films produced in France in 1950.

== A-L ==
Title	Director	Cast	Genre	Notes
The Adventurers of the Air	René Jayet	Ginette Leclerc, Elina Labourdette, Jean Murat	Crime	
Agnes of Nothing	Pierre Billon	Danièle Delorme, Yvonne de Bray, Paul Meurisse	Drama	
Amédée	Gilles Grangier	Rellys, Annette Poivre, Robert Arnoux	Comedy	
And I'm Telling You, She Gave You the Eye!	Maurice Gleize	Bernard Lancret, Madeleine Lebeau, Jean Parédès	Comedy	
The Atomic Monsieur Placido	Robert Hennion	Rellys, Liliane Bert, Robert Arnoux	Comedy	
Ballerina	Ludwig Berger	Violette Verdy, Gabrielle Dorziat, Henri Guisol	Drama	
Beauty and the Devil	René Clair	Michel Simon, Gérard Philipe, Nicole Besnard	Fantasy drama	Co-production with Italy
Beware of Blondes	André Hunebelle	Raymond Rouleau, Martine Carol, Claude Farell	Crime	
Bed for Two; Rendezvous with Luck	Emil-Edwin Reinert	Henri Guisol, Danielle Delorme, Suzanne Flon, Jean Brochard	Comedy	
Black Jack	Julien Duvivier	George Sanders, Patricia Roc, Herbert Marshall	Adventure	Co-production with Spain
Blonde	Maurice Cam	Jules Berry, Denise Grey, Michèle Philippe	Comedy crime	
The Bread Peddler	Maurice Cloche	Vivi Gioi, Philippe Lemaire, Jean Tissier	Historical	Co-production with Italy
Cartouche, King of Paris	Guillaume Radot	Roger Pigaut, Renée Devillers, Claire Duhamel	Adventure	
Casimir	Richard Pottier	Fernandel, Germaine Montero, Jacqueline Duc	Comedy	
A Certain Mister	Yves Ciampi	René Dary, Hélène Perdrière, Pierre Destailles	Crime	
Chéri	Pierre Billon	Jean Desailly, Marcelle Chantal, Marcelle Derrien	Romance	
The Chocolate Girl	André Berthomieu	Giselle Pascal, Claude Dauphin, Jeannette Batti	Comedy musical	
Clara de Montargis	Henri Decoin	Ludmilla Tchérina, Michel François, Roland Armontel	Drama	
Coeur Sur Mer	Jacques Daniel-Norman	Andre Claveau, Armand Bernard, Jean Tissier	Comedy	
Death Threat	Raymond Leboursier	Colette Darfeuil, Pierre Renoir, Marcel Dalio	Crime drama	
Dominique	Yvan Noé	Michel Barbey, Pierrette Caillol, Roger Monteaux	Comedy	
Extravagant Theodora	Henri Lepage	Lucienne Le Marchand, Robert Murzeau, Jacqueline Gauthier	Comedy	
Farewell Mister Grock	Pierre Billon	Grock, Suzy Prim, Charles Lemontier	Drama	Co-production with West Germany
The Ferret	Raymond Leboursier	Jany Holt, Colette Darfeuil, Pierre Renoir	Crime	
Fugitive from Montreal	Jean Devaivre	René Dary, Patricia Roc, Paul Dupuis	Crime drama	Co-production with Canada
The Girl from Maxim's	Marcel Aboulker	Arlette Poirier, Saturnin Fabre, Jacques Morel	Comedy	
The Glass Castle	René Clément	Michèle Morgan, Jean Marais, Fosco_Giachetti	Romantic Drama	Co-production with Italy
God Needs Men	Jean Delannoy	Pierre Fresnay, Madeleine Robinson, Daniel Gélin	Drama	Entered into the 1st Berlin International Film Festival
The Happy Man	Gilles Grangier	Jean-Pierre Aumont, Simone Renant, Jacques Morel	Comedy	
Here Is the Beauty	Jean-Paul Le Chanois	Michèle Morgan, Henri Vidal	Drama	
A Hole in the Wall	Émile Couzinet	André Alerme, Marguerite Pierry, Raymond Galle	Comedy	
The Hunted	Borys Lewin	Dane Clark, Simone Signoret, Fernand Gravey	Crime	
I'm in the Revue	Mario Soldati	Fernandel, Isa Barzizza, Irasema Dilián	Comedy	Co-production with Italy
The Inn of Sin	Jean de Marguenat	Ginette Leclerc, Jean-Pierre Kérien, Édouard Delmont, Jean Parédès	Crime	
Julie de Carneilhan	Jacques Manuel	Edwige Feuillère, Pierre Brasseur, Jacques Dumesnil	Drama	
Just Me	Marc-Gilbert Sauvajon	Maurice Chevalier, Sophie Desmarets, Jean Wall	Comedy	
Justice Is Done	André Cayatte	Michel Auclair, Valentine Tessier, Claude Nollier	Drama	
King Pandora	André Berthomieu	Bourvil, Mathilde Casadesus, Paulette Dubost	Comedy	
La Ronde	Max Ophüls	Simone Signoret, Serge Reggiani, Danielle Darrieux	Drama	Nominated for 2 Oscars, +1 win
Lady Paname	Henri Jeanson	Louis Jouvet, Suzy Delair, Henri Guisol	Comedy drama	
Les Enfants terribles	Jean-Pierre Melville	Nicole Stéphane, Jacques Bernard, Renée Cosima	Drama	
The Little Zouave	Gilles Grangier	François Périer, Dany Robin, Marie Daëms	Comedy drama	
Lost Souvenirs	Christian-Jaque	Suzy Delair, Edwige Feuillère, Gérard Philipe	Drama	

== M-Z ==
Title	Director	Cast	Genre	Notes
Mademoiselle Josette, My Woman	André Berthomieu	Odile Versois, Fernand Gravey, Lysiane Rey	Comedy	
The Man from Jamaica	Maurice de Canonge	Pierre Brasseur, Véra Norman, Georges Tabet	Adventure	
A Man Walks in the City	Marcello Pagliero	Jean-Pierre Kérien, Ginette Leclerc, Grégoire Aslan	Drama	
The Man Who Returns from Afar	Jean Castanier	Annabella, Paul Bernard, María Casares	Thriller	
Manèges	Yves Allégret	Simone Signoret, Bernard Blier, Jane Marken	Drama	
The Marriage of Mademoiselle Beulemans	André Cerf	Hubert Daix, Saturnin Fabre	Comedy	Co-production with Belgium
Marie of the Port	Marcel Carné	Jean Gabin, Blanchette Brunoy, Nicole Courcel	Crime	
Minne	Jacqueline Audry	Danièle Delorme, Frank Villard, Roland Armontel	Comedy	
Miquette	Henri-Georges Clouzot	Louis Jouvet, Danièle Delorme, Bourvil	Comedy	
My Friend Sainfoin	Marc-Gilbert Sauvajon	Pierre Blanchar, Sophie Desmarets, Jacqueline Porel	Comedy	
Murders	Richard Pottier	Fernandel, Mireille Perrey, Jacques Varennes	Drama	
Mystery in Shanghai	Roger Blanc	Hélène Perdrière, Maurice Teynac, Paul Bernard	Crime	
The Naked Heart	Marc Allégret	Michèle Morgan, Kieron Moore, Françoise Rosay	Drama	Co-production with the UK
The New Masters	Paul Nivoix	Albert Préjean, Hélène Perdrière, Raymond Bussières	Comedy	
Night Taxi	Carmine Gallone	Beniamino Gigli, Danielle Godet, Virginia Belmont	Comedy	Co-production with Italy
The Paris Waltz	Marcel Achard	Yvonne Printemps, Pierre Fresnay	Historical musical	Co-production with Italy
No Pity for Women	Christian Stengel	Simone Renant, Michel Auclair	Mystery	
The Patron	Robert Dhéry	Annie Ducaux, André Luguet, André Gabriello	Comedy	
Pigalle-Saint-Germain-des-Prés	André Berthomieu	Jacques Hélian, Jeanne Moreau, Henri Génès	Comedy musical	
Prelude to Glory	Georges Lacombe	Roberto Benzi, Paul Bernard, Jean Debucourt	Drama	
The Prize	Jean Boyer	Bourvil, Jacqueline Pagnol, Mireille Perrey	Comedy	
Old Boys of Saint-Loup	Georges Lampin	François Périer, Serge Reggiani, Odile Versois	Crime	
One Only Loves Once	Jean Stelli	Françoise Rosay, Renée Faure, Marcel Herrand	Drama	
Orpheus	Jean Cocteau	Jean Marais, María Casares	Fantasy drama	Nominated for BAFTA Award
Oriental Port	Jacques Daroy	Yves Vincent, Tilda Thamar	Crime	
Quay of Grenelle	Emil-Edwin Reinert	Henri Vidal, Maria Mauban, Françoise Arnoul	Crime	
Rome Express	Christian Stengel	Hélène Perdrière, Jean Debucourt, Denise Grey	Thriller	
Sending of Flowers	Jean Stelli	Tino Rossi, Micheline Francey	Historical drama	
Shot at Dawn	André Haguet	Renée Saint-Cyr, Franck Villard, Nathalie Nattier	War drama	
Sorceror	Henri Calef	François Périer, Bernard Blier	Drama	
They Are Twenty	René Delacroix	Jacqueline Gauthier, Philippe Lemaire, François Patrice	Comedy	
Thirst of Men	Serge de Poligny	Georges Marchal, Dany Robin	Historical drama	
Three Telegrams	Henri Decoin	Olivier Hussenot, Henri Crémieux	Drama	
The Treasure of Cantenac	Sacha Guitry	Lana Marconi, Michel Lemoine	Comedy	
Tuesday's Guest	Jacques Deval	Bernard Blier, Michel Auclair	Drama	
The Unexpected Voyager	Jean Stelli	Georges Marchal, Dany Robin, Lucienne Le Marchand	Drama	
Vendetta in Camargue	Jean Devaivre	Jean Pâqui, Jean Tissier, Brigitte Auber	Drama	
Véronique	Robert Vernay	Jean Desailly, Gisèle Pascal, Mila Parély	Musical	
Voyage for Three	Jean-Paul Paulin	Jeannette Batti, Pierre-Louis, Jacques Morel	Comedy drama	
We Will All Go to Paris	Jean Boyer	Ray Ventura, Philippe Lemaire	Comedy	
Wedding Night	René Jayet	Martine Carol, Jean Parédès, Mona Goya	Comedy	
The Winner's Circle	René Wheeler	Michèle Alfa, Julien Carette	Drama	
Without Trumpet or Drum	Roger Blanc	Gaby Morlay, Jules Berry, André Gabriello	Comedy	
Women Are Crazy	Gilles Grangier	Raymond Rouleau, Gaby Sylvia, Colette Richard	Comedy	

== See also ==
- 1950 in France
