= List of French films of 1948 =

French films released in 1948

A list of films produced in France in 1948.

== A-L ==
Title	Director	Cast	Genre	Notes
After Love	Maurice Tourneur	Pierre Blanchar, Simone Renant, Giselle Pascal	Drama	
The Barber of Seville	Jean Loubignac	Lucienne Jourfier, Louis Musy, Roger Bourdin	Opera	
Cab Number 13	Mario Mattoli, Raoul André	Ginette Leclerc, Vera Carmi, Leonardo Cortese	Historical drama	Co-production with Italy
The Cavalier of Croix-Mort	Lucien Ganier-Raymond	Henri Nassiet, Madeleine Robinson, Yves Vincent	Historical drama	
The Charterhouse of Parma	Christian-Jaque	Renée Faure, Gérard Philipe, María Casares	Historical	Co-production with Italy
City of Hope	Jean Stelli	René Dary, Anouk Ferjac, Jean Tissier	Drama	
Clochemerle	Pierre Chenal	Félix Oudart, Saturnin Fabre, Jean Brochard	Comedy	
Colomba	Émile Couzinet	José Luccioni, Édouard Delmont, Pierre Magnier	Historical drama	
Colonel Durand	René Chanas	Paul Meurisse, Michèle Martin, Louis Seigner	Historical	
Convicted	Georges Lacombe	Yvonne Printemps, Pierre Fresnay, Roger Pigaut	Drama	
Crossroads of Passion	Ettore Giannini, Henri Calef	Viviane Romance, Clément Duhour, Valentina Cortese	Drama	Co-production with Italy
Cruise for the Unknown One	Pierre Montazel	Claude Dauphin, Sophie Desmarets, Pierre Brasseur	Comedy	
The Cupboard Was Bare	Carlo Rim	Fernandel, Pauline Carton, Annette Poivre	Comedy	
The Dance of Death	Marcel Cravenne	Erich von Stroheim, Denise Vernac, Massimo Serato	Drama	Co-production with Italy
Dark Sunday	Jacqueline Audry	Michèle Alfa, Paul Bernard, Marcelle Derrien	Drama	
Dédée d'Anvers	Yves Allégret	Simone Signoret, Marcel Dalio, Bernard Blier	Crime drama	Nominated for Golden Lion
The Diamond of the Cent	Jacques Daniel-Norman	René Dary, Suzy Carrier, Noëlle Norman, Jean Parédès, Jean Tissier	Comedy	
Dilemma of Two Angels	Maurice Tourneur	Paul Meurisse, Simone Signoret, Marcel Herrand	Crime	
The Eagle with Two Heads	Jean Cocteau	Jean Marais, Edwige Feuillère, Silvia Monfort	Drama	
The Eleven O'Clock Woman	Jean Devaivre	Paul Meurisse, Micheline Francey, Pierre Renoir	Mystery	
The Execrable Fate of Guillemette Babin	Guillaume Radot	Héléna Bossis, Jean Davy, Édouard Delmont	Drama	
Eternal Conflict	Georges Lampin	Annabella, Fernand Ledoux, Michel Auclair	Drama	
The Firemen's Ball	André Berthomieu	Claude Dauphin, Paulette Dubost, Dominique Nohain	Drama	
The Heart on the Sleeve	André Berthomieu	Bourvil, Michèle Philippe, Jacques Louvigny	Comedy	
The Idol	Alexander Esway	Yves Montand, Albert Préjean, Suzanne Dehelly	Drama	
If It Makes You Happy	Jacques Daniel-Norman	Fernandel, Antonin Berval, Mona Dol	Comedy	
If Youth Knew	André Cerf	Jules Berry, Suzet Maïs, Jean Tissier	Comedy	
Impeccable Henri	Charles-Félix Tavano	Claude Dauphin, Marcelle Derrien, Félix Oudart	Comedy	
In the Heart of the Thunderstorm	Jean-Paul Le Chanois		Documentary war	
The Ironmaster	Fernand Rivers	Hélène Perdrière, Jean Chevrier, Jeanne Provost	Drama	
Judicial Error	Maurice de Canonge	Michèle Alfa, Jimmy Gaillard, Lucienne Le Marchand	Drama	
The Lame Devil	Sacha Guitry	Sacha Guitry, Lana Marconi, Henry Laverne	History	Originally censored
The Last Vacation	Roger Leenhardt	Odile Versois, Renée Devillers, Michel François	Drama	
The Loves of Colette	Jean Faurez	François Périer, Colette Richard, Louis Salou	Drama	

== M-Z ==
Title	Director	Cast	Genre	Notes
Mademoiselle Has Fun	Jean Boyer	Ray Ventura, Giselle Pascal, Bernard Lancret	Comedy	
Man to Men	Christian-Jaque	Jean-Louis Barrault, Hélène Perdrière, Bernard Blier	Historical drama	
Memories Are Not for Sale	Robert Hennion	Frank Villard, Blanchette Brunoy, Martine Carol	Comedy drama	
Monelle	Henri Decoin	Louis Jouvet, Dany Robin, Renée Devillers	Drama	
The Murdered Model	Pierre de Hérain	Blanchette Brunoy, Gilbert Gil, Julien Carette	Crime	Co-production with Belgium
Night Express	Marcel Blistène	Roger Pigaut, Sophie Desmarets, Paul Demange	Crime	
Nine Boys, One Heart	Georges Friedland	Édith Piaf, Lucien Baroux, Marcel Vallée	Musical	
Les Parents terribles	Jean Cocteau	Jean Marais, Josette Day, Gabrielle Dorziat	Drama	
Par la fenêtre	Gilles Grangier	Bourvil, Suzy Delair, André Alerme	Comedy	
The Renegade	Jacques Séverac	Louise Carletti, Maurice Escande, Édouard Delmont	Drama	
The Revenge of Baccarat	Jacques de Baroncelli	Pierre Brasseur, Sophie Desmarets, Robert Arnoux	Thriller	Co-production with Italy
Rocambole	Jacques de Baroncelli	Pierre Brasseur, Sophie Desmarets, Robert Arnoux	Thriller	Co-production with Italy
Ruy Blas	Pierre Billon	Danielle Darrieux, Jean Marais, Marcel Herrand	Historical	Co-production with Italy
The Secret of Monte Cristo	Albert Valentin	Pierre Brasseur, Georges Vitray, Pierre Larquey	Historical	
Scandal	René Le Hénaff	Paul Meurisse, Odette Joyeux, Jacqueline Pierreux	Crime thriller	
Sergil and the Dictator	Jacques Daroy	Paul Meurisse, Liliane Bert, Arlette Merry	Thriller	
The Shadow	André Berthomieu	Fernand Ledoux, Renée Faure, Berthe Bovy	Crime	
The Spice of Life	Jean Dréville	Noël-Noël, Bernard Blier, Jean Tissier	Comedy	
Three Boys, One Girl	Maurice Labro	Jean Marchat, Gaby Morlay, Suzy Carrier	Comedy drama	
Three Investigations	Claude Orval	Antonin Berval, Suzy Prim, Junie Astor	Crime	
To the Eyes of Memory	Jean Delannoy	Michèle Morgan, Jean Marais, Jean Chevrier	Drama	
The Tragic Dolmen	Léon Mathot	André Alerme, Germaine Rouer, Paulette Dubost	Mystery	
Under the Cards	André Cayatte	Madeleine Sologne, Serge Reggiani, Paul Meurisse	Crime	
White as Snow	André Berthomieu	Bourvil, Mona Goya, Paulette Dubost	Comedy	
The White Night	Richard Pottier	Pierre Brasseur, Claude Farell, Jimmy Gaillard	Drama	
The Woman I Murdered	Jacques Daniel-Norman	Armand Bernard, Pierre Larquey, Micheline Francey	Drama	
Woman Without a Past	Gilles Grangier	François Périer, Sophie Desmarets, Alfred Adam	Comedy	

== See also ==
- 1948 in France
