= Monsieur Vincent =

1947 French film

- Cover of the Timeless Multimedia VHS edition
- Directed by: Maurice Cloche
- Written by: Jean Anouilh; Jean Bernard-Luc
- Produced by: George de la Grandiere
- Starring: Pierre Fresnay; Aimé Clariond
- Cinematography: Claude Renoir
- Edited by: Jean Feyte
- Music by: Jean-Jacques Grünenwald
- Distributed by: L'Alliance Générale de Distribution Cinématographique
- Release date: 5 November 1947
- Running time: 114 minutes
- Country: France
- Language: French

Monsieur Vincent is a 1947 French historical drama film directed by Maurice Cloche about St. Vincent de Paul. It received an honorary Academy Award in 1949 as the best foreign-language film released in the United States in 1948. The Vatican placed it on its 1995 list of great films. Pierre Fresnay, who plays the titular role of St. Vincent, won the Volpi Cup for Best Actor at the Venice Film Festival. His performance was described in Sight and Sound as "one of the most perfect pieces of work to be seen for many years in any clime".

== Plot ==
St. Vincent de Paul, the 17th-century priest and charity worker, struggles to help the poor in the face of disasters such as the Black Death. While ascending from his life as a simple parish priest to that of a respected advisor to the nobility, he leverages his growing influence among the wealthy to promote the foundation of charitable institutions.

== Cast ==
- Pierre Fresnay as St. Vincent de Paul, priest
- Aimé Clariond as Cardinal Richelieu
- Jean Debucourt as Philippe-Emmanuel de Gondi, Count of Joigny
- Lise Delamare as Françoise Marguerite de Silly, Madame de Gondi
- Germaine Dermoz as Queen Anne of Austria
- Gabrielle Dorziat as President Goussault
- Pierre Dux as Chancellor Séguier
- Yvonne Gaudeau as Louise de Marillac
- Jean Carmet as Father Portail
- Michel Bouquet as tuberculosis sufferer
- Gabrielle Fontan as elder deaf woman
- Robert Murzeau as Monsieur Besnier
- Gabriel Gobin as servant of Monsieur Besnier
- Claude Nicot as page of M. Besnier
- Marcel Pérès as La Pogne
- Francette Vernillat as the little girl
- Georges Vitray as the Count of Châtillon
- Véra Norman as Mademoiselle de Châtillon
- Geneviève Morel as Marguerite Naseau
- Ginette Gaubert as a lady benefactor
- Renée Thorel as a lady benefactor
- Marcel Vallée as administrator of hospices
- Paul Demange as a sacristan with foundling children
- Paul Faivre as a sacristan with foundling children
- Guy Favières as a beggar
- André Dumas as Cardinal Graziani
- Jeanne Hardeyn as Sister Madeleine
- Joëlle Janin as Jeanne
- Maurice Marceau as a poor man
- Maximilienne as a devotee to the church
- Marthe Mellot as an old woman who overeats
- Alice Reichen as the landlady
- Nicole Riche as the landlady's daughter
- Jean Rougerie as poor man
- René Stern as Abbot
- Charles Gérard as a convict

== Awards ==
- 1947: Winner, Volpi Cup for Best Actor at Venice Film Festival, Pierre Fresnay
- 1947: Winner, Grand Prix du Cinéma Français
- 1947: Nominee, Golden Lion prize, Maurice Cloche
- 1948: Winner, Academy Award, Best Foreign-Language Film
- 1949: Nominee. British Academy Film Award, Best Film
- 1950: Nominee, Golden Globes, Promoting International Understanding
