= Vient de paraître =

- Directed by: Jacques Houssin
- Written by: Michel Duran
- Starring: Pierre Fresnay
- Cinematography: Jacques Lemare
- Edited by: Raymond Leboursier
- Music by: Marcel Stern
- Release date: 28 October 1949
- Running time: 97 minutes
- Country: France
- Language: French

Vient de paraître (French: Vient de paraître) is a French film from 1949, directed by Jacques Houssin, written by Michel Duran, and starring by Pierre Fresnay. The film also features Louis de Funès.

== Plot ==
Five authors compete with each other and encounter different personal issues.

== Cast ==
- Pierre Fresnay: Moscat
- Blanchette Brunoy: Jacqueline
- Hélène Petit: Anne-Marie
- Franck Villard: Maréchal
- Henri Rellys: Marc Fournier
- Jean Brochard: Brégaillon
- Jean Ayme: Bourgine
- Louis de Funès: uncredited
- Jacques Mattler: journalist
- Roger Vincent: writer
- André Carnège: Félix
- Pierre Ringel: Henri
