= Mitsou (film) =

1956 film by Jacqueline Audry

Mitsou (or Mitsou ou Comment l'esprit vient aux filles...) is a 1956 French comedy film directed by Jacqueline Audry and starring Danièle Delorme, Fernand Gravey and François Guérin. A music hall singer becomes involved in a love triangle with an older, wealthy man and a young army officer. It is based on the 1919 novella Mitsou by Colette. The title role is played by Danièle Delorme who had previously appeared as Gigi in the 1949 film adaptation of Colette's work Gigi which was also directed by Audry.

== Cast ==
- Danièle Delorme as Mitsou
- Fernand Gravey as Pierre Duroy-Lelong
- François Guérin as Robert, Le Lieutenant Bleu
- Claude Rich as Lieutenant Kaki
- Palau as Beauty
- Denise Grey as Estelle
- Jacques Duby as Raphaël
