= Rigolboche (film) =

1936 film

- Film poster
- Directed by: Christian-Jaque
- Written by: Jean-Henri Blanchon; Jacques de Bérac
- Produced by: Jean-Pierre Frogerais
- Starring: Mistinguett; André Lefaur; Jules Berry
- Cinematography: Marcel Lucien
- Edited by: William Barache
- Music by: Casimir Oberfeld; Jacques Simoneau
- Production company: Productions Sigma
- Distributed by: Les Acacias; Les Films Vog
- Release date: 8 October 1936
- Running time: 90 minutes
- Country: France
- Language: French

Rigolboche is a 1936 French historical musical film directed by Christian-Jaque and starring Mistinguett, André Lefaur and Jules Berry. It portrays a fictionalized version of the life of Rigolboche, the dancer who made the Can-can famous. It was shot at the Billancourt Studios in Paris. The film's sets were designed by the art director Jacques Gotko and Georges Wakhévitch.

== Cast ==
- Mistinguett as Lina Bourget
- André Lefaur as Xavier-Martin, Count of Saint-Servan
- Jules Berry as Bobby
- Mady Berry as Madame Corbin
- André Berley as Tabourot
- Charles Lemontier as Saturnin - director
- Robert Pizani as Lecor - the dealer
- Joe Alex as a dark man
- Henry Bonvallet as director of Criminal investigation department
- Lino Carenzio as Fredo
- Amy Collin as typer
- Régine Dancourt
- Armand Morins as dancer
- Le Petit Patachou as Cricri
- Georges Paulais as investigating judge
- Marcelle Rexiane as the dresser
- Georges Tourreil as Lucien Mirvaux
- Yves Deniaud as Gloria's cashier
- Erika
- Georges-François Frontec
- Pedro Elviro

== Bibliography ==
- Dyer, Richard & Vincendeau, Ginette. Popular European Cinema. Routledge, 2013.
