= Francette Vernillat =

French actress (1937–2019)

- Born: France Benitte; 16 April 1937; Strasbourg, France
- Died: 2 December 2019 (aged 82); Fontenay-lès-Briis, France
- Occupation: Actress

Francette Vernillat (16 April 1937 – 2 December 2019) was a French actress. She was often a voice actor for characters playing young boys.

== Filmography ==
- Autant en emporte le vent (1939)
- L'ombre d'un doute (1943)
- Monsieur Vincent (1947)
- Le destin exécrable de Guillemette Babin (1948)
- Je n'ai que toi au monde (1949)
- Le droit de l'enfant (1949)
- Doctor Laennec (1949)
- Ronde de nuit (1949)
- Maria of the End of the World (1951)
- Les Sept Péchés capitaux (1952)
- Thérèse Raquin (1953)
- Une balle signée X (1959)
- Le Mystère des treize (1966)
- Au-delà du réel (1980)
- The Karate Kid (1984)
- D.A.R.Y.L. (1985)
- Les Enfants du silence (1986)

== Theatre ==
- Le Square du Pérou (1948)
- Le Moulin de la galette (1951)
- Le Bonheur des méchants (1952)
- Les Sorcières de Salem (1954)
- Amour, contact et court-circuit (1960)
