= Passion for Life (film) =

1949 film

- Directed by: Jean-Paul Le Chanois
- Written by: Elise Freinet; Jean-Paul Le Chanois
- Produced by: Pierre Lévy-Corti
- Starring: Bernard Blier; Juliette Faber; Édouard Delmont
- Cinematography: André Dumaître; Marc Fossard; Maurice Pecqueux
- Edited by: Emma Le Chanois
- Music by: Joseph Kosma
- Production companies: Coopérative Générale du Cinéma Français; Union Générale Cinématographique
- Distributed by: Alliance Générale de Distribution Cinématographique
- Release date: 8 April 1949
- Running time: 89 minutes
- Country: France
- Language: French

Passion for Life (French: L'école buissonnière) is a 1949 French comedy drama film directed by Jean-Paul Le Chanois and starring Bernard Blier, Juliette Faber and Édouard Delmont. It was shot at the Victorine Studios in Nice and on location around Saint-Jeannet, Vence and Gattières. The film's sets were designed by the art director Claude Bouxin.

== Synopsis ==
In 1920 a young teacher and Great War veteran of liberal views arrives in a small French town in Provence to take up a position in the local school. His new way of teaching which places great emphasis on the happiness of the students, ruffles the feathers of the more conservative elements in town who try to have him dismissed.

== Cast ==
- Bernard Blier as Buffle Pascal, l'instituteur
- Juliette Faber as Lise Arnaud, l'institutrice
- Édouard Delmont as M. Arnaud, le vieux maître
- Edmond Ardisson as Le coiffeur Pourpre
- Henri Arius as Le maire Hector Malicorne
- Bréols as Aristide
- Géo Beuf as Honoré
- Georges Cahuzac as Cornille
- Jean-Louis Allibert as M. St. Saviole, Le 'novateur'
- Louis Lions as Félix
- Louisol as Le menuisier
- Marcel Maupi as M. Alexandre, the pharmacist
- Rilda as Le facteur
- Sicard as Tordo
- Danny Caron as Cécile Simonin
- Jenny Hélia as Mme Honoré
- Jeanne Mars as Adélaïde
- Marthe Marty as Mélanie
- Raymone as L'aveugle
- Marcel Alba as Un examinateur
- Lucien Callamand as L'examinateur de calcul
- Gaston Modot as L'examinateur de Français
- Henri Poupon as L'examinateur d'histoire
- Jean Aquistapace as L'antiquaire La Verdière
- Pierre Coste as Albert Simonin, le grand chef

== Bibliography ==
- Bessy, Maurice & Chirat, Raymond. Histoire du cinéma français: encyclopédie des films, 1940–1950. Pygmalion, 1986
- Crisp, Colin. French Cinema—A Critical Filmography: Volume 2, 1940–1958. Indiana University Press, 2015.
- Rège, Philippe. Encyclopedia of French Film Directors, Volume 1. Scarecrow Press, 2009.
