= René Hell =

French actor

René Hell (1891–1965) was a French actor.

== Selected filmography ==
- Special Mission (1946)
- Mirror (1947)
- City of Hope (1948)
- Dilemma of Two Angels (1948)
- The Cupboard Was Bare (1948)
- After Love (1948)
- Five Red Tulips (1949)
- The Red Angel (1949)
- The Unexpected Voyager (1950)
- Quay of Grenelle (1950)
- The New Masters (1950)
- One Only Loves Once (1950)
- Rome Express (1950)
- Mammy (1951)
- The Little Cardinals (1951)
- Sweet Madness (1951)
- Piédalu in Paris (1951)
- The Real Culprit (1951)
- Passion (1951)
- Piédalu Works Miracles (1952)
- Imperial Violets (1952)
- The House on the Dune (1952)
- The Red Head (1952)
- Love in the Vineyard (1952)
- A Woman's Treasure (1953)
- Darling Anatole (1954)
- Service Entrance (1954)
- The Count of Bragelonne (1954)
- The Hotshot (1955)
- I'll Get Back to Kandara (1956)
- A Bomb for a Dictator (1957)
- The Tricyclist (1957)
- And Your Sister? (1958)
- Witness in the City (1959)
- All the Gold in the World (1961)
- The Gentleman from Epsom (1962)
