= The Enigma of the Folies-Bergere =

1959 film

- Directed by: Jean Mitry
- Written by: Amédée; Léo Malet (novel); Gloria Phillips
- Produced by: Alphonse Gimeno; Linette Phillips
- Starring: Bella Darvi; Frank Villard; Dora Doll
- Cinematography: Paul Fabian
- Edited by: Paulette Robert
- Music by: Jerry Mengo
- Production company: Gimeno Phillips Films
- Distributed by: Les Films Marbeuf
- Release date: 23 September 1959
- Running time: 82 minutes
- Country: France
- Language: French

The Enigma of the Folies-Bergere (French: Enigme aux Folies-Bergère) is a 1959 French crime film directed by Jean Mitry and starring Bella Darvi, Frank Villard and Dora Doll. The police investigate a series of murders at the Folies-Bergère.

== Cast ==
- Bella Darvi as Solange
- Frank Villard as Le commissaire Raffin
- Dora Doll as Clara
- Armand Mestral as Armand, le chauffeur
- Linda Roméo as une danseuse
- Jean Tissier as Le régisseur
- René Novan as L'inspecteur
- Maximilienne as Mme Rosenthal
- Marcel Pérès
- Charles Lemontier as Courvoisier
- Liliane Robin as Dora
- Yvonne Ménard

== Bibliography ==
- Philippe Rège. Encyclopedia of French Film Directors, Volume 1. Scarecrow Press, 2009.
