= Claude Dolbert =

French film producer

- Born: 23 September 1902; Paris, France
- Died: 4 August 1967 (aged 64); Paris, France
- Occupation: Producer
- Years active: 1935–1957 (film)

Claude Dolbert (1902–1967) was a French film producer and occasional screenwriter. He was married to the actress Hélène Pépée who appeared in several films he produced.

== Selected filmography ==
- Temptation (1936)
- The Club of Aristocrats (1937)
- Troubled Heart (1938)
- The West (1938)
- Miquette (1940)
- White Patrol (1942)
- Mandrin (1947)
- The Barber of Seville (1948)
- Dark Sunday (1948)
- Three Investigations (1948)
- The Secret of Monte Cristo (1948)
- The Woman I Murdered (1948)
- The Barber of Seville (1948)
- Woman Without a Past (1948)
- The Secret of Mayerling (1949)
- The Red Angel (1949)
- Gigi (1949)
- Sending of Flowers (1950)
- Minne (1950)
- The Little Zouave (1950)
- Agnes of Nothing (1950)
- Chéri (1950)
- The Little Cardinals (1951)
- Maria of the End of the World (1951)
- Serenade to the Executioner (1951)
- The Strange Madame X (1951)
- Mammy (1951)
- Love in the Vineyard (1952)
- Les insoumises (1956)

== Bibliography ==
- Goble, Alan. The Complete Index to Literary Sources in Film. Walter de Gruyter, 1999.
