= White Wings (1943 film) =

1943 film

- Directed by: Robert Péguy
- Written by: Paul Achard; Robert Péguy
- Produced by: Jacques Séverac
- Starring: Gaby Morlay; Jacques Dumesnil; Marcelle Géniat
- Cinematography: Philippe Agostini
- Edited by: Émilienne Bigand
- Music by: Tony Aubin
- Production company: Union Française de Production Cinématographique
- Distributed by: Union Française de Production Cinématographique
- Release date: 10 March 1943
- Running time: 93 minutes
- Country: France
- Language: French

White Wings (French: Les ailes blanches) is a 1943 French drama film directed by Robert Péguy and starring Gaby Morlay, Jacques Dumesnil and Marcelle Géniat. It was shot at the Photosonor Studios at Courbevoie in Paris. The film's sets were designed by the art directors Lucien Jaquelux and Lucien Aguettand.

== Synopsis ==
Sister Claire, a nun is dedicated to saving girls who have fallen on hard times, due to her own experience many years before. She encounters a composer who comes to tune the convent's harmonium, a widower with three daughters. He is particularly concerned about the eldest girl Lucette, who has fallen into bad company and has become pregnant.

== Cast ==
- Gaby Morlay as Claire Neubourg devenue Soeur Claire
- Jacques Dumesnil as Gérard Clairval
- Marcelle Géniat as Soeur Louise - la tante de Claire
- Jacques Baumer as Henri Lebourg
- Irène Corday as Lucette
- Pierre Magnier as Dupuis-Villeuse
- Lysiane Rey as Nadine
- Georges Vitray as Maître Verdier - le notaire
- René Dupuy as Albert
- André Nicolle as Le directeur des Folies-Bastille
- Jean Sinoël as Hyacinthe
- Charles Lemontier as Belin
- Jaqueline Bouvier as Cricri
- Saturnin Fabre as Siméon

== Bibliography ==
- Bessy, Maurice & Chirat, Raymond. Histoire du cinéma français: encyclopédie des films, 1940–1950. Pygmalion, 1986
- Burch, Noël & Sellier, Geneviève. The Battle of the Sexes in French Cinema, 1930–1956. Duke University Press, 2013.
- Rège, Philippe. Encyclopedia of French Film Directors, Volume 1. Scarecrow Press, 2009.
