= Edmond Ardisson =

French actor (1904–1983)

Edmond Ardisson (23 October 1904, in Marseille – 30 November 1983, in Jouarre) was a French actor. He appeared in more than ninety films between 1938 and 1983.

== Filmography ==
Film
Year	Title	Role	Notes
1938	La Marseillaise	Jean-Joseph Bomier, le maçon	
1938	Alert in the Mediterranean	La matelot Jaubert	
1939	Latin Quarter	Biscoule	
1940	The Mondesir Heir	Justin - Le chauffeur	
1948	Cruise for the Unknown One	inspector	
1948	The Secret of Monte Cristo	Guilhem Savori	
1948	Dark Sunday	Le portier	
1949	Manon		
1949	Passion for Life	Le coiffeur Pourpre / The Barber	
1949	I Like Only You	Le chauffeur	
1949	Millionaires for One Day	Le directeur	
1950	Here Is the Beauty	Le second gardien de prison	
1950	Prelude to Glory	Le speaker	
1950	Gunman in the Streets	Mattei	
1950	Third from the Right		
1951	Under the Sky of Paris	Un camelot	Uncredited
1951	Edward and Caroline	Le coiffeur	
1951	Miracles Only Happen Once	an employee	Uncredited
1951	The Prettiest Sin in the World	Victor	
1951	Village Feud	Cugue	
1952	The Green Glove	Chauffeur	Uncredited
1952	La maison dans la dune		
1952	Allô... je t'aime	Le détective	
1952	We Are All Murderers	Un garde	Uncredited
1952	Manon of the Spring	Ange, le fontainier	
1953	Une fille dans le soleil	Racalan	
1953	The Baker of Valorgue	Le facteur Evariste	
1953	The Other Side of Paradise	Célestin	
1953	Act of Love	L'hôtelier de Villefranche	Uncredited
1954	Crainquebille	Un bistrot	
1954	The Sheep Has Five Legs	Le brigadier	
1954	Service Entrance	Le laveur	Uncredited
1954	Ali Baba and the Forty Thieves	Mendiant	
1955	Les chiffonniers d'Emmaüs	Casino	
1955	Pas de souris dans le business		
1955	Spring, Autumn and Love	Le Facteur	
1955	House on the Waterfront	Le patron de la boîte	
1955	Papa, maman, ma femme et moi	L'employé du gaz	Uncredited
1955	Black Dossier	Le restaurateur	
1955	La Madelon	Un infirmier	Uncredited
1956	People of No Importance	Le routier giflé	
1956	Marie Antoinette Queen of France	Le locataire	Uncredited
1956	I'll Get Back to Kandara	Le buraliste	
1956	It Happened in Aden	Le patron	
1956	Honoré de Marseille	Victor - le cafetier	
1956	I'll Get Back to Kandara	Le buraliste	
1957	The Case of Dr. Laurent	Robert	Uncredited
1957	The Suspects	Linda	
1957	On Foot, on Horse, and on Wheels	Duchemin	
1958	Les Misérables	gendarme	
1958	La p... sentimentale		
1959	Arrêtez le massacre		
1960	Quai du Point-du-Jour	Monsieur Gaston - le bistrot	
1960	Bouche cousue	Titin	
1960	Recours en grâce	Le gendarme Piletti	
1961	Cocagne	Un collègue de Marc-Antoine	
1961	Les honneurs de la guerre	Varesquier	
1962	Adieu Philippine	Le chef d'émission	
1962	The Devil and the Ten Commandments	Un agent	(segment "Bien d'autrui ne prendras")
1963	Jusqu'au bout du monde		
1963	La Cuisine au beurre	Carlotti	
1963	La parole est au témoin		
1964	De l'assassinat considéré comme un des beaux-arts		
1965	The Sleeping Car Murders	Le policier marseillais	Voice, Uncredited
1966	Your Money or Your Life	Le contrôleur de quai à Paris	Uncredited
1966	The Gardener of Argenteuil	Un gendarme	
1967	Shock Troops	Le caissier	
1968	L'Homme à la Buick	Filippi	
1970	Heureux qui comme Ulysse...	Le bouliste	
1970	The Lady in the Car with Glasses and a Gun	Garage Night Man	
1970	The Little Theatre of Jean Renoir	César	TV movie, (segment "Le roi d'Yvetot")
1972	Le Viager	Le chef du train	
1972	Trop jolies pour être honnêtes	Foulon, un gardien de prison	
1975	Love and Death	Priest	
1978	La barricade du Point du Jour	Martégay	
