= Marcel Landowski =

French composer, biographer and arts administrator

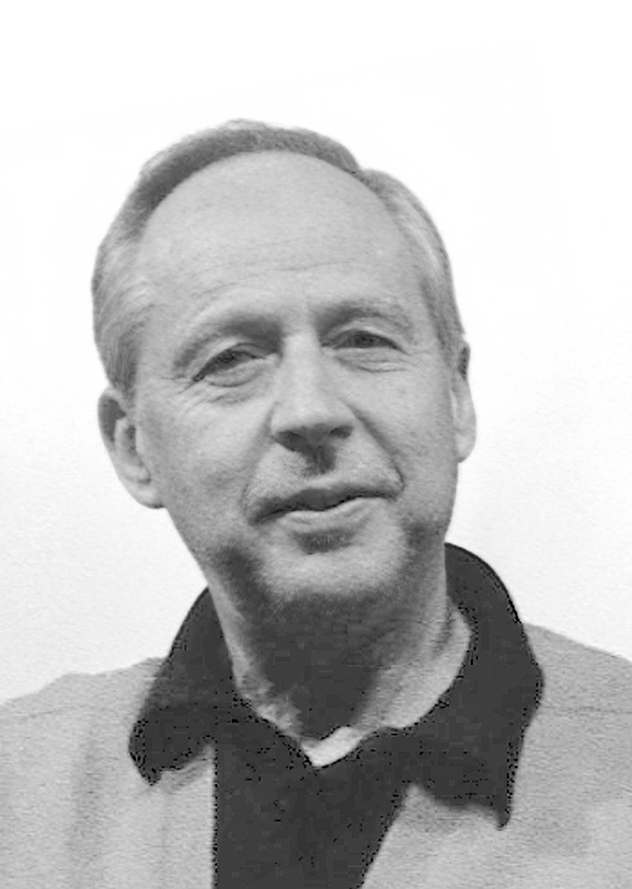
- Education: Paris Conservatoire

Marcel François Paul Landowski (18 February 1915 – 23 December 1999) was a French composer, biographer and arts administrator.

== Biography ==
Born at Pont-l'Abbé, Finistère, Brittany, he was the son of French sculptor Paul Landowski and great-grandson of the composer Henri Vieuxtemps. He was father of a son and two daughters. The younger, Manon Landowski is singer-songwriter, performer, author and composer of musical shows.

As an infant he showed early musical promise, and studied piano under Marguerite Long. He entered the Paris Conservatoire in 1935; in addition one of his teachers was Pierre Monteux.

=== Administrative career ===
In 1966, France's Cultural Affairs minister André Malraux appointed Landowski as the ministry's director of music, a controversial appointment made in the teeth of opposition from the then ascendant modernists, led by Pierre Boulez.

One of his first acts was the establishment, in 1967, of the Orchestre de Paris, appointing Charles Munch as its first director. He also championed the establishment of regional orchestras at a time when interest in them appeared to be waning. This was part of a so-called "ten-year plan for music", instituted with the intention of establishing an opera company and conservatoire in each of the Regions of France. The new Orchestre de Paris was also built on the model intended to be followed by planned regional orchestras. In this endeavour Landowski worked with local authorities, especially those in the regional centres such as Bordeaux, Lille, Lyon, Strasbourg and Toulouse, who signed agreements under which the French State would finance a third of each company or ensemble's operating budget. Landowski also oversaw modernisation of regional concert halls and theatres.

In 1975 Landowski was appointed Inspector General of Music, and was Director of Cultural Affairs of the City of Paris from 1977 to 1979. He succeeded Emmanuel Bondeville as President of the Maurice Ravel Foundation and was in turn succeeded by Manuel Rosenthal.

He died in hospital in Paris in 1999, aged 84.

=== Compositions ===
Landowski eschewed the avant-garde approaches to music of his contemporaries, preferring a more conservative style. His greatest musical influence was Arthur Honegger. His entire output includes five symphonies, several concertos (notably two for piano and one each for bassoon, for cello, for flute, for trumpet, for trombone, for violin), operas as well as a Mass and bears testimony to Honegger's impact. Landowski went on to write a biography of his mentor.

==== Selected works ====
- 1940 Piano Concerto No. 1
- 1949 Symphony No. 1, "Jean de la Peur"
- 1954 Concerto for ondes Martenot and string orchestra.
- 1956 Le Fou (opera)
- 1962 Les Notes du Nuit (symphonic poem)
- 1963 Piano Concerto No. 2
- 1963 Symphony No. 2
- 1964 Symphony No. 3, "Des Espaces"
- 1968 Flute Concerto
- 1976 Trumpet Concerto, "Au bout du chagrin, une fenêtre ouverte"
- 1977 Messe de l'Aurore, oratorio on a poem by Pierre Emmanuel
- 1979 Un enfant apelle (concerto composed for the cellist Mstislav Rostropovich and his wife, soprano Galina Vishnevskaya).
- 1982 L'Horloge, symphonic poem.
- 1987 La Vieille Maison, "musical tale" in 2 acts
- 1988 Symphony No. 4
- 1998 Symphony No. 5, "Les Lumières de la nuit"

Many of his works were recorded by Erato Records who issued a retrospective of his recordings in 2010.

==== Selected filmography ====
Between the 1940s and the 1960s, Landowski composed the scores for several dozen films, most notably Gigi (1949).

- Mandrin (1947)
- Dark Sunday (1948)
- Three Investigations (1948)
- The Woman I Murdered (1948)
- The Secret of Monte Cristo (1948)
- Street Without a King (1950)
- Agnes of Nothing (1950)
- Chéri (1950)
- Mammy (1951)
- Serenade to the Executioner (1951)
- The Passerby (1951)
- Maria of the End of the World (1951)
- Operation Thunder (1954)
- Crime at the Concert Mayol (1954)
