= Le secret du Chevalier d'Éon =

- Directed by: Jacqueline Audry
- Written by: Jacques Laurent; Pierre Laroche
- Starring: Andrée Debar; Bernard Blier; Dany Robin; Gabriele Ferzetti; Isa Miranda; Jean Desailly
- Release date: 1959
- Country: Italy
- Language: Italian

Le secret du Chevalier d'Éon is a 1959 French-Italian film. It stars Andrée Debar and Gabriele Ferzetti. It is loosely based on the life of Chevalier d'Éon, although it portrays them as a woman masquerading as a man, rather than a person who was biologically male but presenting as a woman, as was the case for the latter part of their life.
