= Mandrin (1947 film) =

1947 film

- Directed by: René Jayet
- Written by: Jacques Chabannes; André Haguet
- Based on: Mandrin by Arthur Bernède
- Produced by: Claude Dolbert
- Starring: José Noguéro; Armand Bernard; Mona Goya
- Cinematography: René Colas
- Music by: Marcel Landowski
- Production company: Codo Cinema
- Distributed by: Les Réalisations d'Art Cinématographique
- Release dates: 15 November 1947 (Part I); 7 April 1948 (Part II)
- Running time: 185 minutes
- Country: France
- Language: French

Mandrin is a 1947 French historical adventure film directed by René Jayet and starring José Noguéro, Armand Bernard and Mona Goya. It is based on the life of the eighteenth century French brigand Louis Mandrin.

The film's sets were designed by the art director Louis Le Barbenchon. It was released in two separate parts, premiering five months apart entitled Le libérateur and La tragédie d'un siècle.

== Cast ==
- José Noguéro as Mandrin
- Armand Bernard as Sansonnet
- Mona Goya as Madame de Pompadour
- Antonin Berval as Général La Morlière
- Aimé Simon-Girard as Ricord
- Philippe Mareuil a Patrice Aspremont
- Philippe Richard as Carcasse
- Émile Ronet as Cadet
- Jacqueline Carrel as Isabelle
- Joëlle Robin as Yolande
- Charles Lemontier as L'abbé
- Ponzio as Baryton
- Julien Maffre as Un villageois
- Robert Pizani as Voltaire
- Hélène Pépée as La mère supérieure
- Paul Azaïs as Trognard
- Georges Vitray as Brochant d'Erigny
- Albert Broquin as Le cocher
- René Stern as Un laquais
- Roger Vincent as Soubise

== See also ==
- Mandrin (1924)
- Mandrin (1962)

== Bibliography ==
- Klossner, Michael. The Europe of 1500–1815 on Film and Television: A Worldwide Filmography of Over 2550 Works, 1895 Through 2000. McFarland & Company, 2002.
