= Suzanne Dantès =

French actress (1888–1958)

- Born: 29 April 1888; Saint-Quentin, Aisne, France
- Died: 29 July 1958 (aged 70); Saint-Léger-en-Yvelines, Yvelines, France
- Occupation: Actor
- Years active: 1922-1958 (film)

Suzanne Dantès (1888–1958) was a French stage and film actress.

== Selected filmography ==
- The Courier of Lyon (1923)
- Black and White (1931)
- A Happy Man (1932)
- Arlette and Her Fathers (1934)
- Extenuating Circumstances (1939)
- Miquette (1940)
- Sins of Youth (1941)
- Chiffon's Wedding (1942)
- Sideral Cruises (1942)
- The Great Pack (1945)
- The Cavalier of Croix-Mort (1948)
- The Cupid Club (1949)
- Two Doves (1949)
- Chéri (1950)
- Their Last Night (1953)
- The Gambler (1958)

== Bibliography ==
- Michaël Abecassis. The Representation of Parisian Speech in the Cinema of the 1930s. Peter Lang, 2005.
