= Bitter Fruit (1967 film) =

- Directed by: Jacqueline Audry
- Screenplay by: Colette Audry; Jacqueline Audry; Rados Novakovic
- Starring: Emmanuelle Riva
- Cinematography: Maurice Fellous
- Edited by: Francine Grubert
- Release date: 1967
- Countries: France; Italy; Yugoslavia
- Language: French

Fruits amers (Bitter Fruit), or in Spanish release Soledad, is a 1967 film directed by Jacqueline Audry and starring Emmanuelle Riva, Laurent Terzieff, and Beba Lončar.
