= Marc Fossard =

French cinematographer

- Born: 15 August 1912; Rivery, France
- Died: July 2007 (aged 94); France
- Occupation: Cinematographer
- Years active: 1934 - 1980 (film)

Marc Fossard (1912–2007) was a French cinematographer who worked on over a hundred films during his career.

== Selected filmography ==
- Maria Chapdelaine (1934)
- Anne-Marie (1936)
- Beethoven's Great Love (1937)
- Pépé le Moko (1937)
- Woman of Malacca (1937)
- Coral Reefs (1939)
- Entente cordiale (1939)
- Children of Paradise (1945)
- The Black Cavalier (1945)
- Scandal (1948)
- The Heroic Monsieur Boniface (1949)
- Passion for Life (1949)
- The Red Angel (1949)
- Sending of Flowers (1950)
- The Marriage of Mademoiselle Beulemans (1950)
- Without Leaving an Address (1951)
- Serenade to the Executioner (1951)
- Mammy (1951)
- Maria of the End of the World (1951)
- Matrimonial Agency (1952)
- The Secret of the Mountain Lake (1952)
- Twelve Hours of Happiness (1952)
- A Girl on the Road (1952)
- The Girl with the Whip (1952)
- Rhine Virgin (1953)
- April Fools' Day (1954)
- Scandal in Montmartre (1955)
- Pity for the Vamps (1956)
- Three Sailors (1957)
- I Spit on Your Grave (1959)
- The Gendarme of Champignol (1959)
- The Sahara Is Burning (1961)
- Mandrin (1962)
- The Gorillas (1964)
- Céleste (1970)

== Bibliography ==
- Turk, Edward Baron. Child of Paradise: Marcel Carné and the Golden Age of French Cinema. Harvard University Press, 1989.
