= The Lovers of Bras-Mort =

1951 film directed by Marcello Pagliero

- Directed by: Marcello Pagliero
- Written by: Jacques Dopagne; Robert Scipion
- Produced by: Paul-Edmond Decharme
- Starring: Nicole Courcel; Frank Villard; Henri Génès
- Cinematography: Roger Hubert
- Edited by: Nicole Marko
- Music by: Georges Auric
- Production company: Alcina
- Distributed by: Pathé Consortium Cinéma
- Release date: 17 May 1951
- Running time: 86 minutes
- Country: France
- Language: French

The Lovers of Bras-Mort (French: Les amants de Bras-Mort) is a 1951 French drama film directed by Marcello Pagliero and starring Nicole Courcel, Frank Villard and Henri Génès. Location shooting took place around Conflans-Sainte-Honorine at the confluence of the Seine and Oise rivers The film's sets were designed by the art director Maurice Colasson.

== Cast ==
- Nicole Courcel as Monique Levers
- Frank Villard as Jean Michaut
- Henri Génès as Nestor
- Line Noro as Madame Levers
- Robert Dalban as Monsieur Levers
- Philippe Nicaud as Robert Girard
- Mona Goya as La veuve Girard
- Jacky Flynt as Maguy
- Margo Lion as Hélène Michaut
- René Génin as Camille
- Fernand Fabre as Daniel
- Georges Paulais as Le notaire
- Paul Faivre as Un agent
- André Bellec as Un marinier
- Jean Berton as Un marinier
- Jean Clarieux as Un marinier
- Gabriel Gobin as Un marinier
- Jacques Hilling as Un marinier

== Bibliography ==
- Rège, Philippe. Encyclopedia of French Film Directors, Volume 1. Scarecrow Press, 2009.
