= Danièle Delorme =

French actress and producer (1926–2015)

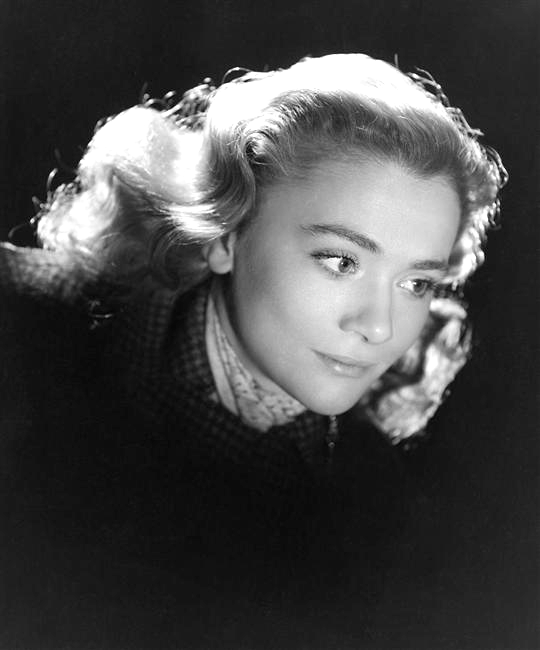
- Delorme in 1953
- Born: Gabrielle Danièle Marguerite Andrée Girard; 9 October 1926; Levallois-Perret, Hauts-de-Seine, France
- Died: 17 October 2015 (aged 89); Paris, France
- Occupations: Actress, film producer
- Years active: 1942–2001
- Spouse(s): Daniel Gélin (1945–1955) (divorced); Yves Robert (1956–2002; his death)
- Children: Xavier (1946–1999)

Gabrielle Danièle Marguerite Andrée Girard (9 October 1926 – 17 October 2015), known by her stage name Danièle Delorme (French pronunciation: [danjɛl dəlɔʁm]), was a French actress and film producer, famous for her roles in films directed by Marc Allégret, Julien Duvivier and Yves Robert.

== Early life ==
Gabrielle Danièle Marguerite Andrée Girard was born on 9 October 1926 in Levallois-Perret, Hauts-de-Seine, one of four children to the well-known painter, poster-maker, and theater-designer André Girard and his wife Andrée (nee Jouan). Girard maintained a studio in Venice in 1936–1937 and in Manhattan, New York City, in 1938. After the Battle of France (1940), Girard removed to Antibes, then a free-zone, and established a network that provided recruiting and spying work for the French resistance. It was during this time that young Delorme began her acting career.

== Career ==
In 1940, at the age of 14, Delorme began acting and played a series of minor roles before she began acting in film. Two years later, owing to her father's contacts, she was able at age 16 (at the time using the name Danièle Girard) to secure a bit part in The Beautiful Adventure (La Belle aventure (1942)).

Two years later, director Marc Allégret again used Delorme in a large role. This time, she performed with the stage name she used for the rest of her career: Danièl Delorme. One story developed that she took the name in order to hide from the Gestapo her relationship to her father. However, the suggestion came from character actor Bernard Blier, who performed with her in her second film to take the name from the heroine of Victor Hugo's play Marion Delorme. (Delorme co-starred with Blier two decades later in the philosophical courtroom criminal drama The Seventh Juror (Le septième juré (1962)).

During the first decade of her career Delorme played delicate, demure, bright young women, roles for which she was physically fitted. Her first husband Daniel Gélin, who also performed in The Beautiful Adventure, said she had "the face of a little girl, an upturned nose with passionate nostrils, the lips of a child, the body of a woman and a certain way about her that turns heads." Richard W. Seaver of the New York Times described her as "a winsome wisp of an actress, with her soft smile and grey eyes." These features landed her a breakthrough role in Miquette et sa mère (1949). In 1949, she also played the title role in Gigi (1949 film), before Leslie Caron's success in the same role in the American (musical) version (Gigi (1958 film)) .

Also notable was her performance as femme fatale in Julien Duvivier's Voici le temps des assassin (1956) (Deadlier Than the Male in the US and Twelve Hours to Live in the UK), co-starring with Jean Gabin.

In 1960, Delorme joined more than 140 intellectuals, teachers, writers and celebrities in signing a manifesto supporting the right of French conscripts to refuse military service in Algeria. As a result, the French government on 28 September issued a ban against all signatories from appearing on state-run radio or television or in state-run theaters. At the same time, the information minister stated that another cabinet order was in preparation that would deny government funding to any film project in which any signatory appeared.

== Death ==
Delorme died on 17 October 2015.

== Personal life ==
In 1945, Delorme married actor Daniel Gélin with whom she had a son, Xavier (1946–1999), also an actor. Delorme divorced Gélin in 1954. In 1956, Delorme married actor/filmmaker Yves Robert who was her partner in a production company. They remained married until his death in 2002.

Delorme served as a member of the Caméra d'Or jury at the 1988 Cannes Film Festival.

Delorme died in Paris on 17 October 2015 at age 89. Her death was announced on 19 October by the director of the Paris art gallery An Girard, which she created to present the works of her father. According to the statement, she died in her sleep after years of illness.

== Selected filmography ==
- The Beautiful Adventure (1942) – Monique
- Les Petites du quai aux fleurs (1944) – Bérénice Grimaud
- Twilight (1944) – La camarade de Félicie (uncredited)
- Lunegarde (1946)
- The Captain (1946)
- Les J3 (1946) – Une élève
- Ouvert pour cause d'inventaire (1946)
- Les jeux sont faits (1947) – La noyée
- Cruise for the Unknown One (1948)
- Dilemma of Two Angels (1948) – Anne-Marie
- Gigi (1949) – Gilberte dite 'Gigi'
- Cage of Girls (1949) – Micheline
- Agnes of Nothing (1950) – Agnès de Chaligny
- Miquette (1950) – Miquette Grandier
- Minne (1950) – Minne
- Bed for Two; Rendezvous with Luck (1950) – Michèle
- Lost Souvenirs (1950) – Danièle (segment "Une cravate de fourrure")
- Without Leaving an Address (1951) – Thérèse Ravenaz
- Olivia (1951) – Une ancienne élève (uncredited)
- Venom and Eternity (1951) – Herself
- Desperate Decision (1952) – Catherine
- L'Amour, Madame (1952) – Herself (uncredited)
- The Long Teeth (1953) – Eva Commandeur – la fiancée puis la femme de Louis
- Women of Paris (1953) – Jeune femme cliente du Ruban Bleu (uncredited)
- Le Guérisseur (1953) – Isabelle Dancey
- Mara (1953)
- Royal Affairs in Versailles (1954) – Louison Chabray
- A Slice of Life (1954) – Mara (segment "Mara")
- House of Ricordi (1954) – Maria
- Huis clos (1954) – Florence Langlois (uncredited)
- Black Dossier (1955) – Yvonne Dutoit
- Deadlier Than the Male (1956) – Catherine
- Mitsou (1956) – Mitsou
- Les Misérables (1958) – Fantine
- Neither Seen Nor Recognized (1958) – L'admiratrice (uncredited)
- Every Day Has Its Secret (1958) – Olga Lezcano
- Women's Prison (1958) – Alice Rémon ou Dumas
- Cléo from 5 to 7 (1962) – La vendeuse de fleurs / Actress in silent film
- The Seventh Juror (1962) – Geneviève Duval
- Marie Soleil (1964) – Marie-Soleil
- Des Christs par milliers (1969) – Danièle
- Hoa-Binh (1970) – French Nurse
- Le Voyou (1970) – Janine
- À corps perdu (1970) – Lydia Deflandre, directed by Abder Isker, based on a story by Francis Durbridge
- Repeated Absences (1972) – La mère de François
- The Hunted (1972) – Lilian
- Belle (1973) – Jeanne
- Pardon Mon Affaire (1976) – Marthe Dorsay
- Pardon Mon Affaire, Too! (1976) – Marthe Dorsay
- La barricade du Point du Jour (1978) – La Générale Eudes
- Dirty Dreamer (1978)
- The Crying Woman (1979)
- Qu'est-ce qui fait courir David? (1982) – Georges
- La côte d'amour (1982) – Helle Waver
- November Moon (1985) – Ferial's mother
- Bal perdu (1990) – Maryse de Belloise
- Les eaux dormantes (1992) – Mme de Lespinière
- Sortez des rangs (1996) – Mme Germaine
