= The Heroic Monsieur Boniface =

1949 film

- Directed by: Maurice Labro
- Written by: Gérard Carlier; André Tabet
- Produced by: Roger de Broin; Roger Ribadeau-Dumas
- Starring: Fernandel; Gaston Orbal; Liliane Bert
- Cinematography: Marc Fossard
- Edited by: Monique Isnardon; Robert Isnardon
- Music by: Louiguy
- Production companies: La Société des Films Sirius; Société Française de Cinématographie
- Distributed by: La Société des Films Sirius
- Release date: 19 October 1949
- Running time: 92 minutes
- Country: France
- Language: French

The Heroic Monsieur Boniface (French: L'Héroïque Monsieur Boniface) is a 1949 French comedy film directed by Maurice Labro and starring Fernandel, Andrex, Gaston Orbal and Liliane Bert. It was shot at the Photosonor Studios in Paris. The film's sets were designed by the art director Jacques Colombier. It was followed by a 1951 sequel The Sleepwalker.

== Synopsis ==
Boniface, a shy window dresser, finds himself caught up in a murder case, and decides to tackle the gang leader behind the killing. They in turn kidnaps Boniface's girlfriend Irene.

== Cast ==
- Fernandel as Boniface
- Andrex as Charlie
- Gaston Orbal as M. Simon
- Charles Bouillaud as Le troisième gangster
- Palmyre Levasseur as La logeuse
- Julien Maffre as Le lampiste
- Albert Malbert as Le bistrot
- Max Révol as Le chef de gare
- Francis Salabert as Le commissaire
- Michel Ardan as Le deuxième gangster
- Yves Deniaud as Le premier gangster
- Liliane Bert as Irène

== Bibliography ==
- Rège, Philippe . Encyclopedia of French Film Directors, Volume 1. Scarecrow Press, 2009.
