= The Little Cardinals =

1951 film

- Directed by: Gilles Grangier
- Written by: Françoise Giroud; Marc-Gilbert Sauvajon
- Based on: Les petites Cardinal by Ludovic Halévy
- Produced by: Claude Dolbert
- Starring: Saturnin Fabre; Véra Norman; Denise Grey
- Cinematography: Marcel Grignon
- Edited by: André Gug
- Music by: Vincent Scotto
- Production company: Codo Cinéma
- Distributed by: Pathé Consortium Cinéma
- Release date: 22 June 1951
- Running time: 93 minutes
- Country: France
- Language: French

The Little Cardinals (French: Les petites Cardinal) is a 1951 French historical comedy film directed by Gilles Grangier and starring Saturnin Fabre, Véra Norman and Denise Grey. It was shot at the Saint-Maurice Studios in Paris. The film's sets were designed by the art director Raymond Druart. It was based on Ludovic Halévy's novel of the same title.

== Synopsis ==
Virginie and Pauline Cardinal are two attractive ballerinas sisters of the Paris Opera the time of the Second Empire and Commune. They draw a great deal of public attention, as their careers and potential romantic matches steered by their parents who are alive to the possibilities of social climbing.

== Cast ==
- Saturnin Fabre as Horace Cardinal
- Véra Norman as Virginie Cardinal
- Denise Grey as Mme Cardinal
- Jacques Castelot as Le baron des Glaïeuls
- Claude Nicot as Gaspard
- Sophie Leclair as Pauline Cardinal
- Jacques Meyran as Giuseppe Chamborini, maitre á chanter
- Henri Niel as Le concierge
- Jacqueline Noëlle as Anais, une danseuse
- Paul Azaïs as Le régisseur
- Jean Tissier as Marquis Alberto de Cavalcanti
- Charles Lemontier as Jacquelin
- Albert Michel as Le gendarme
- René Hell as Le bonapartiste
- Jacques Beauvais as Le cocher
- Georges Paulais as Le porteur

== Bibliography ==
- Goble, Alan. The Complete Index to Literary Sources in Film. Walter de Gruyter, 1999.
- Rège, Philippe. Encyclopedia of French Film Directors, Volume 1. Scarecrow Press, 2009
