= Palmyre Levasseur =

French actress (1888-1963)

- Born: 24 December 1888; Cuvergnon, Oise, France
- Died: 4 August 1963 (aged 74); Paris, France
- Other name: Palmyre Augustine Thion
- Occupation: Actress
- Years active: 1931–1958 (film)

Palmyre Levasseur (24 December 1888 – 4 August 1963) was a French stage and film actress.

== Selected filmography ==
- Culprit (1937)
- The Fraudster (1937)
- Tricoche and Cacolet (1938)
- The Postmaster's Daughter (1938)
- The Mayor's Dilemma (1939)
- The Mondesir Heir (1940)
- The Emigrant (1940)
- False Alarm (1940)
- Sins of Youth (1941)
- The Stairs Without End (1943)
- The Captain (1946)
- A Friend Will Come Tonight (1946)
- The Murderer is Not Guilty (1946)
- Goodbye Darling (1946)
- Love Around the House (1947)
- The Great Maguet (1947)
- After Love (1948)
- Dark Sunday (1948)
- Clochemerle (1948)
- The Woman I Murdered (1948)
- Three Investigations (1948)
- The Cupboard Was Bare (1948)
- Cage of Girls (1949)
- Eve and the Serpent (1949)
- Doctor Laennec (1949)
- The Heroic Monsieur Boniface (1949)
- Emile the African (1949)
- Atoll K (1951)
- Never Two Without Three (1951)
- Pleasures of Paris (1952)
- Yours Truly, Blake (1954)
- Service Entrance (1954)
- Life Together (1958)

== Bibliography ==
- Norbert Aping. The Final Film of Laurel and Hardy: A Study of the Chaotic Making and Marketing of Atoll K. McFarland, 2008.
