= The Murderer Is Not Guilty =

1946 film

The Murderer is Not Guilty
- Directed by: René Delacroix
- Written by: Alex Joffé; Jean Lévitte
- Produced by: René Delacroix; Roger Ribadeau-Dumas
- Starring: Albert Préjean; Jacqueline Gauthier; Jules Berry
- Cinematography: Jean Bachelet
- Edited by: Marguerite Beaugé
- Music by: Henri Verdun
- Production company: SIFFRA
- Distributed by: Gaumont Distribution
- Release date: 30 July 1946
- Running time: 82 minutes
- Country: France
- Language: French

The Murderer is Not Guilty (French: L'assassin n'est pas coupable) is a 1946 French crime film directed by René Delacroix and starring Albert Préjean, Jacqueline Gauthier and Jules Berry. A writer investigates after a number of film actors are killed.

== Cast ==
- Albert Préjean as Julien Brisseau
- Jacqueline Gauthier as Juliette Brisseau
- Jules Berry as himself
- Henri Charrett as Inspector Vétillard
- Jean Gaven as The young inspector Gustave Perkinson
- François Joux as himself
- Ky Duyen as Tao - the servant
- Marcel Raine as Pierre Carrel - the director
- Maurice Schutz as The collector
- Sinoël as The cinema producer
- Germaine Stainval as One of Kéradec's two young ladies
- Madeleine Suffel
- Jacques Vallauris
- Héléna Manson as Anne-Marie Mahé
- Rosine Deréan as Madame Carrel
- Marguerite de Morlaye as The old lady who testifies
- René Delacroix
- Lucien Desagneaux
- Rudy Lenoir
- Palmyre Levasseur as The woman who makes a statement
- René Marjac
- Franck Maurice as The gendarme orderly
- Pierre Moncorbier as Le fou
- Roger Pigaut as himself
- Pâquerette
- Pierre Vaudier
- Roger Vincent

== Bibliography ==
- Rège, Philippe. Encyclopedia of French Film Directors, Volume 1. Scarecrow Press, 2009.
