= The Gardener of Argenteuil =

1966 film by Jean-Paul Le Chanois

- Theatrical release poster
- French: Le jardinier d'Argenteuil
- Directed by: Jean-Paul Le Chanois
- Screenplay by: Alphonse Boudard; François Boyer; Jean-Paul Le Chanois
- Based on: Le jardinier d'Argenteuil; 1933 novel by René Jouglet
- Produced by: Raymond Danon; Roger de Broin
- Starring: Jean Gabin; Liselotte Pulver; Pierre Vernier; Alfred Adam; Jeanne Fusier-Gir; Serge Gainsbourg; Claude Nicot; Henri Rellys; Katrin Schaake; Noël Roquevert; Jean Tissier
- Cinematography: Walter Wottitz
- Edited by: Emma Le Chanois
- Music by: Serge Gainsbourg
- Production companies: Les Films Copernic; Gafer; Films Vertried; Roxy Film
- Distributed by: Comacico (France); Constantin Film (West Germany)
- Release dates: 7 October 1966 (France); 27 December 1966 (West Germany)
- Running time: 88 minutes
- Countries: France; West Germany
- Language: French

The Gardener of Argenteuil (French: Le jardinier d'Argenteuil; German: Blüten, Gauner und die Nacht von Nizza, lit. 'Blossoms, Crooks and the Night of Nice') is a 1966 crime comedy film directed by Jean-Paul Le Chanois and starring Jean Gabin, Liselotte Pulver, and Pierre Vernier. It was shot at the Victorine Studios in Nice and on location around Paris, including Argenteuil where much of the film takes place. The film's sets were designed by the art director Paul-Louis Boutié.

== Synopsis ==
Monsieur Martin who lives in an old railway carriage at Argenteuil near Paris is known to his neighbours for his skill as gardener. In fact he is also a forger of banknotes.

== Cast ==
- Jean Gabin as Le père Tulipe M. Martin
- Liselotte Pulver as Hilda
- Curd Jürgens as Le Baron Edouard de Santis
- Pierre Vernier as Noël
- Alfred Adam as L'homme en robe de bure
- Noël Roquevert as Le patron du restaurant
- Jean Tissier as Albert
- Mary Marquet as Dora
- Jeanne Fusier-Gir as L'Altesse
- Serge Gainsbourg as Patrick Gérard
- Claude Nicot as Le patron d'Hilda
- Henri Rellys as Le cocher
- Katrin Schaake as Patricia
- Edmond Ardisson as Un gendarme
