= Pierre Laroche =

French screenwriter

- Born: 7 May 1902; Paris, France
- Died: 3 April 1962 (aged 59); Paris, France
- Occupation: Screenwriter
- Years active: 1941–1962 (film)

Pierre Laroche (1902–1962) was a French journalist, screenwriter and novelist. He was active in the French film industry from the 1940s to the 1960s. Laroche collaborated with Jacques Prévert on the script of Les Visiteurs du Soir (1942).

He was married to the film director Jacqueline Audry with whom he collaborated a number of times.

== Selected filmography ==
- L'enfer des anges (1941)
- Une femme disparaît (1942)
- Les Visiteurs du Soir (1942)
- The Mysteries of Paris (1943)
- A Woman in the Night (1943)
- Summer Light (1943)
- Father Serge (1945)
- Girl with Grey Eyes (1945)
- The Misfortunes of Sophie (1946)
- Coïncidences (1947)
- Noah's Ark (1947)
- The Battle of the Heavy Water (1948)
- The Secret of Monte Cristo (1948)
- Dark Sunday (1948)
- The Cavalier of Croix-Mort (1948)
- The Woman I Murdered (1948)
- Clochemerle (1948)
- Gigi (1949)
- Fantomas Against Fantomas' (1949)
- The Red Angel (1949)
- Chéri (1950)
- Quay of Grenelle (1950)
- The Little Zouave (1950)
- Minne (1950)
- The Cape of Hope (1951)
- Serenade to the Executioner (1951)
- Olivia (1951)
- Messalina (1951)
- The Strange Madame X (1951)
- Mammy (1951)
- Serenade to the Executioner (1951)
- Love in the Vineyard (1952)
- They Were Five (1952)
- The Beauty of Cadiz (1953)
- Huis clos (1954)
- Zaza (1956)
- Every Day Has Its Secret (1958)
- School for Coquettes (1958)
- It's All Adam's Fault (1958)
- Le secret du Chevalier d'Éon (1959)
- The Black Monocle (1961)
- Operation Gold Ingot (1962)
- The Seventh Juror (1962)
- Girl on the Road (1962)

== Bibliography ==
- Lanzoni, Rémi Fournier . French Cinema: From Its Beginnings to the Present. A&C Black, 2004.
