= Manon Landowski =

French singer-songwriter (born 1964)

Manon Landowski (born 1964) is a French singer-songwriter who sings chansons and pop music. She is the author, composer and performer of the musical show Le Manège.

== Biography ==
She is the daughter of French composer Marcel Landowski and granddaughter of sculptor Paul Landowski.

Landowski began playing the piano at the age of 7 and then entered the Conservatoire national Supérieur de danse at the age of 13. Three years later, she entered the Paris Opera. At 17, she left the Opera and wrote her first songs.

Landowski sang in the first part of Cora Vaucaire, Léo Ferré and Juliette Gréco. She gave concerts in Paris, Hauts-de-Seine and other regions of France. As singer, dancer and actress, Landowski played in several musical shows.

Her musical show Le Manège was created at the Opéra-Comique in 1997 (arrangements by Jean-Pierre Pilot). Pierre Cardin produced it in his theater "Espace Cardin" the following year. Directed by Daniel Mesguich the show was a great success in Los Angeles in May 2000.

== Selected works ==
- Le Manège (musical show, author and composer, 1997/1998)
- Mademoiselle Faust (musical show, with Xavier Maurel, 2004)

== Discography ==
=== Albums ===
- Sur L'instant (Just'In Distribution, 1989)
- Overground N'Existe Pas (BMG, 1994)

=== Singles ===
- Au Loin De Toi / Un Et Deux (D.L.B., 1989)
- On Aurait Du Se Dire (D.L.B., 1989)
- Choisis-Moi (BMG, 1993)
- Overground N'existe Pas (BMG, 1994)

== Filmography ==
- Doux amer (singer: theme song, 1987)
- Star Academy (répétiteur, 2002)
