= The Seventh Juror =

1962 film by Georges Lautner

- Directed by: Georges Lautner
- Screenplay by: Pierre Laroche; Jacques Robert
- Based on: The Seventh Juror by Francis Didelot
- Produced by: Paul Joly
- Cinematography: Maurice Fellous
- Edited by: Michelle David
- Music by: Jean Yatove
- Release date: 18 April 1962
- Running time: 90 minutes
- Country: France
- Language: French

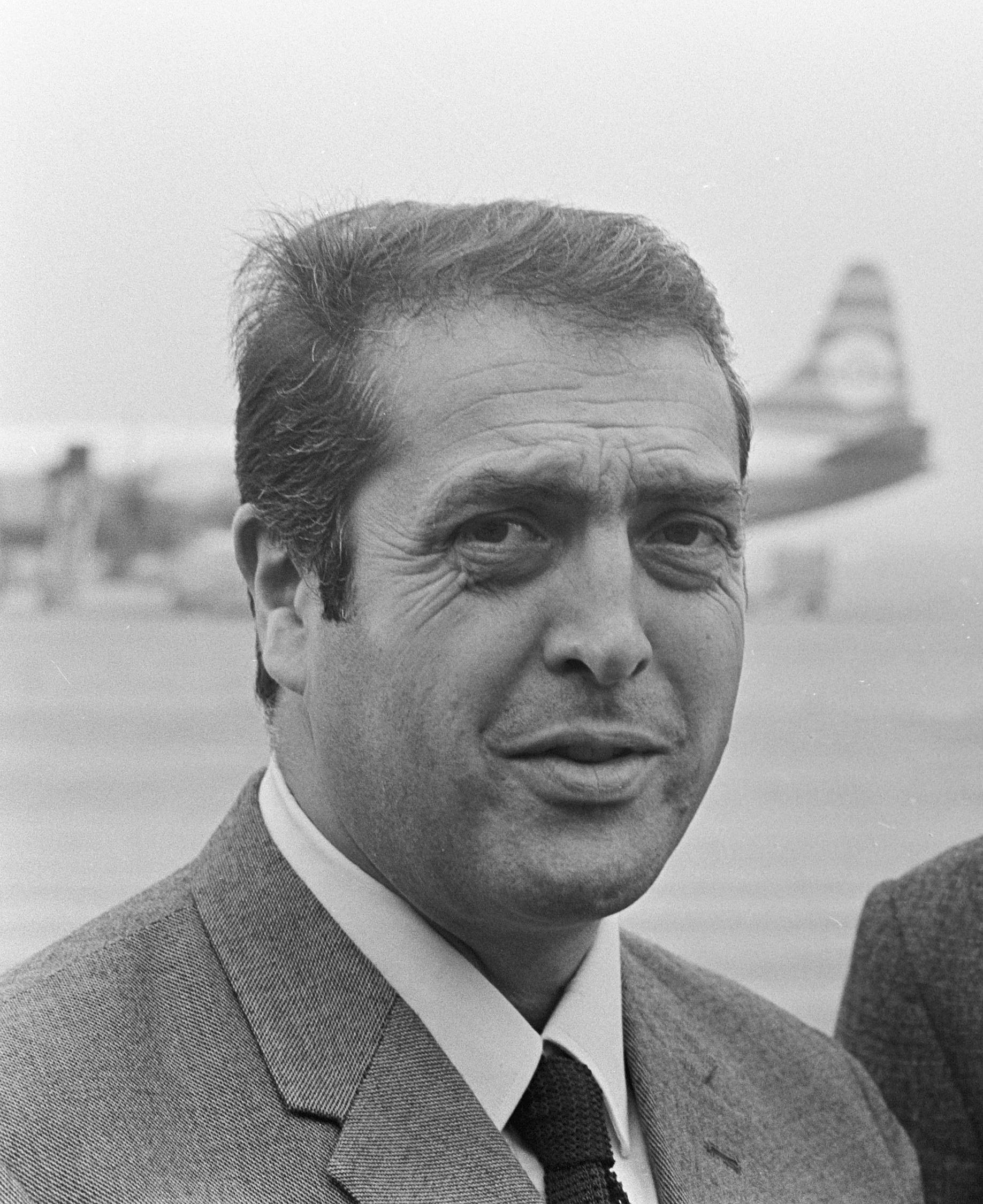
Director Georges Lautner arrives at Schiphol, 1966

The Seventh Juror (French: Le septième juré) is a 1962 French crime drama directed by Georges Lautner, starring Bernard Blier, Maurice Biraud, Francis Blanche and Danièle Delorme. It tells the story of a man who murders a young woman; when the woman's boyfriend is wrongly accused of the murder, the actual killer is chosen to serve in the jury, but does not want an innocent man to be convicted. The film is based on the novel The Seventh Juror by Francis Didelot. Principal photography took place from 14 November to 23 December 1961, mostly in Pontarlier (Doubs). The film had 1,171,911 admissions in France.

== Cast ==
- Bernard Blier as Grégoire Duval
- Maurice Biraud as Veterinarian
- Francis Blanche as Attorney General
- Danièle Delorme as Geneviève Duval
- Jacques Riberolles as Sylvain Sautral
- Yves Barsacq as Maître Adreux
- Catherine Le Couey as Mme. Souchon
- Robert Dalban as Fisherman
- Anne Doat as Alice Moreux
- Madeleine Geoffroy as Mme. Sylvestre
- Françoise Giret as Catherine
- Camille Guérini as Judge
- Charles Lavialle as Preceptor
