= The Red Angel (film) =

1949 film

- Directed by: Jacques Daniel-Norman
- Written by: Pierre Laroche; Jacques Daniel-Norman
- Produced by: Claude Dolbert
- Starring: Paul Meurisse; Tilda Thamar; Antonin Berval
- Cinematography: Marc Fossard
- Edited by: Hélène Battini
- Music by: Francis Lopez
- Production companies: Codo-Cinéma; Productions Claude Dolbert
- Distributed by: Les Films Georges Muller
- Release date: 1 July 1949
- Running time: 95 minutes
- Country: France
- Language: French

The Red Angel (French: L'ange rouge) is a 1949 French crime drama film directed by Jacques Daniel-Norman and starring Paul Meurisse, Tilda Thamar and Antonin Berval. The film's sets were designed by the art director Raymond Druart.

== Synopsis ==
A former gangster returns from Argentina with a new girlfriend and opens a nightclub called The Red Angel. Her singing performances make it a success, but trouble arrives when one of his former associates on the run from the law takes shelter in the nightclub.

== Cast ==
- Paul Meurisse as Pierre Ravignac
- Tilda Thamar as Rita Tyndar
- Antonin Berval as Antonin Baretta
- Paul Demange as Loulou
- Ketty Kerviel as Plume
- Alexander D'Arcy as Ocelli
- Nana de Herrera as Lola
- Serge Grave as Roger
- Roland Armontel as Le commissaire Martin
- Rivers Cadet as Le gardien-chef
- Albert Dinan as Max
- René Hell as Harpin
- Jacques Henley as Le directeur de la prison
- Charles Lemontier as L'inspecteur Lerouge
- Georges Sauval as Le chauffeur

== Bibliography ==
- Rège, Philippe. Encyclopedia of French Film Directors, Volume 1. Scarecrow Press, 2009.
