= Mammy (1951 film) =

1951 film

- Directed by: Jean Stelli
- Written by: Alejandro Casona (novel); Pierre Laroche; Albert Valentin
- Produced by: Claude Dolbert
- Starring: Gaby Morlay; Pierre Larquey; Françoise Arnoul
- Cinematography: Marc Fossard
- Edited by: André Gug
- Music by: Marcel Landowski
- Production company: Codo Cinéma
- Distributed by: Consortium du Film
- Release date: 28 November 1951
- Running time: 81 minutes
- Country: France
- Language: French

Mammy is a 1951 French drama film directed by Jean Stelli and starring Gaby Morlay, Pierre Larquey and Françoise Arnoul. It was shot at the Saint-Maurice Studios in Paris. The film's sets were designed by the art director Raymond Druart.

== Synopsis ==
Madame Pierre, known as Mammy, dotes on her grandson Maurice. He has been away in Canada for ten years, and is a disreputable lowlife. However her husband has created a false image of a decent, happily married architect for her benefit. When news comes of Maurice's disappearance in a plane crash, Mammy is so distraught that her husband hires a young couple to pose as Maurice and his invented wife Marthe, in the hope that his wife will accept them as real.

== Cast ==
- Gaby Morlay as Mme Pierre dite Mammy
- Pierre Larquey as Dr. André Pierre
- Françoise Arnoul as Marthe Roux
- Andrée de Chauveron as Geneviève
- Claude Nicot as Le petit ami
- Micheline Gary as Lucette
- Solange Varenne as Marie
- Michel Jourdan as Le vrai Maurice
- Marcel Delaître as Un acolyte de Maurice
- Philippe Hersent as Un acolyte de Maurice
- Maurice Blanchot as Un acolyte de Maurice
- Gaby Tyra as La soeur
- Luce Fabiole as La concierge
- Georges Sauva] as Le boucher
- René Hell as Le vendeur de journaux
- Philippe Lemaire as Maurice Laprade

== Bibliography ==
- Rège, Philippe. Encyclopedia of French Film Directors, Volume 1. Scarecrow Press, 2009.
