= Serenade to the Executioner =

1951 film

- Directed by: Jean Stelli
- Written by: Maurice Dekobra; Pierre Laroche; Albert Valentin
- Based on: Serenade to the Executioner by Maurice Dekobra
- Produced by: Claude Dolbert
- Starring: Paul Meurisse; Tilda Thamar; Antonin Berval
- Cinematography: Marc Fossard
- Edited by: André Gug
- Music by: Marcel Landowski
- Production company: Codo Cinéma
- Distributed by: Compagnie Commerciale Française Cinématographique
- Release date: 31 May 1951
- Running time: 93 minutes
- Country: France
- Language: French

Serenade to the Executioner (French: Sérénade au bourreau) is a 1951 French crime drama film directed by Jean Stelli and starring Paul Meurisse, Tilda Thamar and Antonin Berval. It is based on the 1928 novel of the same title by Maurice Dekobra. It was shot at the Saint-Maurice Studios in Paris. The film's sets were designed by the art director Raymond Druart.

== Synopsis ==
Criminal William A. Schomberg masquerades as a physician running a nursing home. He becomes obsessed with the idea that one of his patients Didier is having an affair with his attractive wife Irène. With Inspector Fourasse on his tail Schomberg closes the home and disappears. However he strangles Irène and makes it look as if Didier is guilt of the murder.

== Cast ==
- Paul Meurisse as William A. Schomberg
- Tilda Thamar as Irène Schomberg
- Antonin Berval as Inspecteur Léon Fourasse
- Julien Bertheau as Lorenzi
- Solange Varenne as Mélie
- Jean Pignol as Gilbert
- Gérard Landry as Didier Laurent
- Véra Norman as Paula Cherry

== Bibliography ==
- Bessy, Maurice & Chirat, Raymond. Histoire du cinéma français: 1951-1955. Pygmalion, 1989.
- Goble, Alan. The Complete Index to Literary Sources in Film. Walter de Gruyter, 1999.
- Rège, Philippe. Encyclopedia of French Film Directors, Volume 1. Scarecrow Press, 2009.
