= Rasputin (1938 film) =

1938 film directed by Marcel L'Herbier

- Directed by: Marcel L'Herbier
- Written by: Alfred Neumann (novel); Steve Passeur; Max Glass; Marcel L'Herbier
- Produced by: Max Glass
- Starring: Harry Baur; Marcelle Chantal; Pierre Richard-Willm; Jean Worms
- Cinematography: Philippe Agostini; Michel Kelber
- Edited by: Raymond Leboursier
- Music by: Darius Milhaud
- Production company: Max Glass Film
- Distributed by: Comptoir Français du Film
- Release date: 28 January 1938
- Running time: 95 minutes
- Country: France
- Language: French

Rasputin (French: La Tragédie impériale) is a 1938 French historical film directed by Marcel L'Herbier and starring Harry Baur, Marcelle Chantal and Pierre Richard-Willm. It depicts the rise and fall of the Russian mystic Grigori Yefimovich Rasputin, the advisor to the Romanov royal family. It was shot at the Joinville Studios in Paris. The film's sets were designed by the art director Guy de Gastyne.

== Cast ==
- Harry Baur as Rasputin
- Marcelle Chantal as Tsarine Alexandra
- Pierre Richard-Willm as Comte Igor Kourloff
- Jean Worms as Tsar Nicholas II
- Jany Holt as Groussina
- Jacques Baumer as Prokoff
- Georges Malkine as Beggar
- Lucien Nat as Ostrowski
- Carine Nelson as Ania Kitina
- Palau as Piotr
- Georges Prieur as Grand-Duc Nikolaievich
- Alexandre Rignault as Bloch
- Gabrielle Robinne as Tsarine-mère
- Martial Rèbe as Iliodore
- Denis d'Inès as Évèque Gregorian
- Georges Vitray as Ivanov
- André Gabriello as Stankevitch
- Joffre as L'archimandrite
- Georges Paulais as Un quémandeur
- Léon Larive as Le pope
- Georges Bever as Le servant du pope
- Jean Claudio as Le tsarevitch
- Marcel Barencey as Membre du Saint-Synode
- Marguerite Templey as La générale
- Ginette Gaubert as Princesse Dolgoroukine
- Paul Escoffier as Médecin de la cour
- Suzanne Devoyod as La supérieure du couvent
- Lucien Hector as L'homme de la mobilisation
- Robert Moor as Maître-d'hôtel d'Ania
- Génia Vaury as Nadia
- Cécile Didier as Maria
- Mady Berry as Dounia
- Zélie Yzelle as Une paysanne
- Valentine Camax as Une religieuse
- Colette Régis as Une religieuse
- Lucien Pascal as Le politicien
- Roger Blin as Le jeune paysan
- Alexandre Mihalesco as Le prédicateur
- Albert Brouett as Un solliciteur
- Georges Morton as Un solliciteur
- Albert Malbert as Le policier

== Bibliography ==
- Kennedy-Karpat, Colleen. Rogues, Romance, and Exoticism in French Cinema of the 1930s. Fairleigh Dickinson, 2013.
