= Maria of the End of the World =

1951 film

- Directed by: Jean Stelli
- Written by: Charles Exbrayat
- Based on: La Chasse à l'homme by Jean Martet
- Produced by: Claude Dolbert
- Starring: Paul Meurisse; Denise Cardi; Jacques Berthier
- Cinematography: Marc Fossard
- Edited by: André Gug
- Music by: Marcel Landowski
- Production company: Codo Cinéma
- Distributed by: Filmsonor
- Release date: 16 March 1951
- Running time: 90 minutes
- Country: France
- Language: French

Maria of the End of the World (French: Maria du bout du monde) is a 1951 French adventure drama film directed by Jean Stelli. It stars Paul Meurisse, Denise Cardi (as Maria, Mathias' wife) and Jacques Berthier. It is based on the 1941 novel La Chasse à l'homme by Jean Martet. It tells the story of Maria, who desires to explore the Big City despite having a husband whose focus is less on her and more on his creatures.

The film's sets were designed by art director Raymond Druart.

== Cast ==
- Paul Meurisse as Mathias
- Denise Cardi as Maria
- Jacques Berthier as Thierry
- Marcel Delaître as Va-Tout-Seul
- Marcel Raine as Césaire
- Charles Lemontier as Albin
- Francette Vernillat as Bertie
- Jacques Bougheriou as Norbert
- France Ellys as Delphine
- Paul Azaïs as Le vieil homme

== Bibliography ==
- Goble, Alan. The Complete Index to Literary Sources in Film. Walter de Gruyter, 1999.
- Rège, Philippe. Encyclopedia of French Film Directors, Volume 1. Scarecrow Press, 2009.
