= Andrée Danis =

French film editor

- Occupation: Editor
- Years active: 1919–1952 (film)

Andrée Danis was a French film editor. She worked on around thirty films between 1919 and 1952 including Abel Gance's J'accuse.

== Selected filmography ==
- J'accuse (1919)
- The Duke of Reichstadt (1931)
- The Eaglet (1931)
- A Man of Gold (1934)
- The Happy Road (1936)
- They Were Twelve Women (1940)
- Paris-New York (1940)
- Strange Suzy (1941)
- Promise to a Stranger (1942)
- Frederica (1942)
- After the Storm (1943)
- Secret Documents (1945)
- Danger of Death (1947)
- Rendezvous in Paris (1947)
- Amédée (1950)
- Chéri (1950)
- Agnes of Nothing (1950)
- My Seal and Them (1951)
- My Friend Oscar (1951)
- Jocelyn (1952)
- The Crime of Bouif (1952)

== Bibliography ==
- Pym, John. Time Out Film Guide. Penguin Books, 2002.
