= Yours Truly, Blake =

1954 film by Jean Laviron

- Directed by: Jean Laviron; Jerome Epstein
- Written by: Jerome Epstein; Jacques Vilfrid
- Produced by: Marcel Berbert; Ignace Morgenstern
- Starring: Eddie Constantine; Danielle Godet; Simone Paris
- Cinematography: Jacques Lemare
- Edited by: Andrée Feix
- Music by: Jeff Davis
- Production companies: Chaillot Films; Cocinex; Cocinor
- Distributed by: Cocinor
- Release date: 1 December 1954
- Running time: 97 minutes
- Country: France
- Language: French

Yours Truly, Blake (French: Votre dévoué Blake) is a 1954 French comedy crime film directed by Jean Laviron and Jerome Epstein and starring Eddie Constantine, Danielle Godet and Simone Paris. The film's sets were designed by Robert Clavel.

== Plot ==
While spending a night out in Paris an American airline pilot gets entangled with a beautiful nightclub performer and soon finds himself under suspicion of murder.

== Cast ==
- Eddie Constantine as Larry Blake - un pilote de ligne américain
- Danielle Godet as Michèle Marley aka Marion Miller
- Simone Paris as Elyane de Broussac
- Gil Delamare as Georges
- Colette Deréal as Stella
- Dora Doll as Isabelle
- Jacques Dynam as Gaston
- Robert Dalban as L'inspecteur Tessier
- Henri Cogan as Sam
- Jack Ary as L'inspecteur Brevan
- Marcel Charvey as Laurent
- Henry Belly as L'assistant
- Maurice Chevit as Un complice
- Robert Hirsch as Saganoff
- Bob Ingarao as Le premier complice
- Palmyre Levasseur as La concierge de Michèle
- Yette Lucas as La bistrote
- Roger Vincent as Le portier

== Bibliography ==
- Michel Marie. The French New Wave: An Artistic School. John Wiley & Sons, 2008.
