= Love in the Vineyard =

1952 film

- Directed by: Robert Vernay
- Written by: Pierre Scize; Pierre Laroche
- Based on: Ils sont dans les vignes by Pierre Scize
- Produced by: Claude Dolbert; Paul Robin
- Starring: Line Renaud; Lucien Baroux; Suzanne Dehelly
- Cinematography: René Gaveau
- Edited by: Marthe Poncin
- Music by: Louis Gasté
- Production company: Union Européenne Cinématographique
- Distributed by: Les Films Marceau
- Release date: 31 October 1952
- Running time: 89 minutes
- Country: France
- Language: French

Love in the Vineyard (French: Ils sont dans les vignes) is a 1952 French comedy film directed by Robert Vernay and starring Line Renaud, Lucien Baroux and Suzanne Dehelly. It was shot on location in the Côte-d'Or particularly around Beaune.

== Synopsis ==
The congress of a league against alcohol is due to be held in the wine-producing Burgundy region. This divides two brothers Pimpin Desbordes, a heavy-drinking merrymaker who organises the winemakers against it, and the puritanical Commissioner Desbordes who backs the initiative. Meanwhile, Rose, the daughter of an innkeeper, falls for the representative of a tonic water brand.

== Cast ==
- Line Renaud as Rose Filhol
- Lucien Baroux as Le commissaire Desbordes
- Suzanne Dehelly as Léontine Desbordes
- Albert Préjean as Pimpin Desbordes
- Maurice Régamey as Pierre Moreau
- Fernand Gilbert as Filhol
- Jean Daurand as Le deuxième copain
- Philippe Olive as Le brigadier
- Léon Belières as Monseigneur
- Paul Demange as Le chef de gare
- Robert Seller as Le sous-préfet
- Christian Lude as Eugène
- Paul Bonifas as L'Américain
- Henri Marchand as Le premier copain
- René Hell as Le premier agent
- Ernest Varial as L'allumeur
- Raymond Rognoni as Le curé
- Raymond Cordy as Arbaner
- Jean Dunot as Tabouret

== Bibliography ==
- Bessy, Maurice & Chirat, Raymond. Histoire du cinéma français: 1951-1955. Pygmalion, 1989.
- Goble, Alan. The Complete Index to Literary Sources in Film. Walter de Gruyter, 1999.
- Rège, Philippe. Encyclopedia of French Film Directors, Volume 1. Scarecrow Press, 2009.
