= Operation Thunder (film) =

1954 film

- Directed by: Gérard Sandoz
- Written by: Guy de Bourge; Jean-Charles Reynaud; Gérard Sandoz
- Produced by: André Roy
- Starring: Blanchette Brunoy; Jean-Pierre Kérien; Howard Vernon
- Cinematography: Pierre Dolley
- Edited by: Gabriel Rongier
- Music by: Marcel Landowski
- Production company: Roy Films
- Distributed by: Ciné Sélection
- Release date: November 1954
- Running time: 95 minutes
- Country: France
- Language: French

Operation Thunder (French: Opération tonnerre) is a 1954 French spy thriller film directed by Gérard Sandoz and starring Blanchette Brunoy, Jean-Pierre Kérien and Howard Vernon. The film's sets were designed by the art director Claude Bouxin.

== Synopsis ==
While military manoeuvres are taking place in a small town in Provence, foreign spies attempt to steal important secret documents.

== Cast ==
- Blanchette Brunoy as Sonia Brévannes
- Célia Cortez as Annie Desforges
- Jean-Pierre Kérien as Pierre Dumans
- Howard Vernon as Roger Kervec
- Jacques Charon as Maurice Favier
- Jacques Torrens as Guy Lormoy
- Liliane Ernout as Jacqueline Desforges
- Gabriel Sardet as Lormoy
- Charles Lemontier as Professeur Desforges
- Gérard Le Faivre as Jean Lormoy

== Bibliography ==
- Dicale, Bertrand. Louis de Funès, grimaces et gloire. Grasset, 2009.
- Rège, Philippe. Encyclopedia of French Film Directors, Volume 1. Scarecrow Press, 2009.
