= City of Hope (1948 film) =

1948 film

- Directed by: Jean Stelli
- Written by: Carlo Rim
- Produced by: Lucien Masson
- Starring: René Dary; Anouk Ferjac; Jean Tissier
- Cinematography: Marcel Grignon
- Edited by: Mireille Baron
- Music by: Louiguy
- Production company: Sirius Films
- Distributed by: Sirius Films
- Release date: 27 October 1948
- Running time: 92 minutes
- Country: France
- Language: French

City of Hope (French: Cité de l'espérance) is a 1948 French drama film directed by Jean Stelli and starring René Dary, Anouk Ferjac and Jean Tissier. The film's sets were designed by the art director Jacques Colombier.

== Cast ==
- René Dary as Pierre Maufranc
- Anouk Ferjac as Louise
- Jean Tissier as Stanislas
- Jean Parédès as Albaric
- Léon Bary as Williams
- André Bervil as Reggio
- René Blancard as Le commissaire
- Roger Bontemps as Un inspecteur
- Paul Demange as Frankie
- Albert Dinan as M. Victor
- Louis Florencie as Bonpard
- René Hell as Gravier
- Jacques Henley as Smith
- Renée Lebas as La goualeuse
- Albert Michel as Le père La Fraise
- Nina Myral as Mme Euripide
- Robert Noël as Freddy
- Gaston Orbal as O'Meara
- Georges Paulais as Le juge d'instruction
- Marcel Raine as Matteo

== Bibliography ==
- Bessy, Maurice & Chirat, Raymond. Histoire du cinéma français: encyclopédie des films, 1940–1950. Pygmalion, 1986
- Rège, Philippe. Encyclopedia of French Film Directors, Volume 1. Scarecrow Press, 2009.
