= Minne (film) =

1950 film

- Directed by: Jacqueline Audry
- Written by: Pierre Laroche
- Based on: Minne by Colette
- Produced by: Claude Dolbert
- Starring: Danièle Delorme; Frank Villard; Roland Armontel
- Cinematography: Marcel Grignon
- Edited by: Marguerite Beaugé
- Music by: Vincent Scotto
- Production company: Codo Cinéma
- Distributed by: Compagnie Commerciale Française Cinématographique
- Release date: 24 May 1950
- Running time: 90 minutes
- Country: France
- Language: French

Minne (French: Minne, l'ingénue libertine) is a 1950 French comedy film directed by Jacqueline Audry and starring Danièle Delorme, Frank Villard and Roland Armontel. It is based on the 1904 novel Minne by Colette. It was shot at the Billancourt Studios in Paris. The film's sets were designed by the art director Raymond Druart.

== Cast ==
- Danièle Delorme as Minne
- Frank Villard as Antoine
- Roland Armontel as L'oncle Paul
- Jean Tissier as Maugis
- Claude Nicot as Le baron Jacques Couderc
- Charles Lemontier as Chaulieu
- Pamela Wilde as Une invitée
- Lucien Guervil as Camille
- Alexa as La chanteuse Polaire
- Marcel Mérovée as Léopold
- Sylvain as Le limier
- Charles Bayard as Le vieux marcheur
- Charlotte Clasis as Célénie
- Jean Guélis as Le frisé et Ramon
- Simone Paris as Irène Chaulieu

== Bibliography ==
- Goble, Alan. The Complete Index to Literary Sources in Film. Walter de Gruyter, 1999.
- Rège, Philippe. Encyclopedia of French Film Directors, Volume 1. Scarecrow Press, 2009.
