= Impeccable Henri =

1948 film

- Marcelle Derrien and Claude Dauphin
- Directed by: Charles-Félix Tavano
- Written by: Jean Dilly; Maurice Griffe; Marc-Gilbert Sauvajon
- Produced by: Pierre Gérin
- Cinematography: Georges Million
- Edited by: Henri Taverna
- Music by: Jean Marion
- Production company: Les Productions Cinématographiques
- Distributed by: Ciné Sélection
- Release date: 13 August 1948
- Country: France
- Language: French

Impeccable Henri (French: L'Impeccable Henri) is a 1948 French comedy film directed by Charles-Félix Tavano and starring Claude Dauphin, Marcelle Derrien and Félix Oudart. The film's sets were designed by the art director Robert-Jules Garnier.

== Cast ==
- René Alone
- Armand Bernard as Lopez
- Charles Bouillaud
- Claude Dauphin as Henri - le majordome
- Marcelle Derrien as Ève Fournier-Salville
- Christiane Derèze
- Hélène Garaud as La bonne
- Mona Goya as Elvire
- Yette Lucas as La cuisinière
- Félix Oudart as L'homme d'affaires Fournier-Salville
- Georges Paulais as Le jardinier
- Michel Roux as Tony
- Albert Rémy as Gustave
- Raymond Soukoff
- Jean Wall as Gérard

== Bibliography ==
- Philippe Rège. Encyclopedia of French Film Directors, Volume 1. Scarecrow Press, 2009.
