= Gigi (1949 film) =

- Poster
- Directed by: Jacqueline Audry
- Screenplay by: Pierre Laroche
- Based on: Gigi; 1944 novella by Colette
- Produced by: Claude Dolbert
- Starring: Gaby Morlay; Jean Tissier; Yvonne de Bray; Frank Villard; Paul Demange; Madeleine Rousset
- Cinematography: Gérard Perrin
- Edited by: Nathalie Petit-Roux
- Music by: Marcel Landowski
- Production company: Codo Cinéma
- Distributed by: Union Française de Production Cinématographique
- Release date: 5 October 1949
- Running time: 82 minutes
- Country: France
- Language: French

Gigi is a 1949 French comedy film directed by Jacqueline Audry and starring Gaby Morlay, Jean Tissier and Yvonne de Bray. A young girl (Danièle Delorme) who is coming of age and being trained as a courtesan by her family, and realises she not only adores the debonair, close family friend Gaston, who has spoiled her with attention and care for most of her life, but that she is in love with him. Gaston realises the same thing, and despite efforts of Gigi's down-to-earth, doting grandmother and charming socialite aunt to bring the couple together by the then socially accepted practice, it is the undeniable and compelling love between Gigi and Gaston that triumphs. It was directed by Jacqueline Audry, who accentuates the humor of this piece without losing the sensitivity of the young love that takes center stage. The film was based on the 1944 novella Gigi written by Colette.

A better-known version, starring Leslie Caron and Louis Jourdan, was filmed in 1958. The 1949 film is included as an extra on the 2008 2-disc DVD and 2009 Blu-ray Disc versions of the 1958 film.

== Plot ==
The story begins in 1900 fin de siecle Paris, and is seen through the eyes of the elderly Honoré LaChaille as he watches the sixteen-year-old school girl Gilberte "Gigi" Alvarez. Gigi is the young ward and granddaughter of Honoré's old friend, Mme. Alvarez.

Honoré's nephew, Gaston LaChaille, is the center of Parisian society and heir to the sugar empire of France. Bored with his social life, Gaston finds peace in the apartment of Mme. Alvarez, where he frequently visits.

Gigi is bored with her social education, but both her grandmother and her great-aunt, Alicia, insist she be properly trained. Alicia tells Gigi that everything in life that is of importance, even love, has to be learned as an art form.

Gaston sees Gigi at her grandmother's apartment, and the young bachelor becomes attracted to her. He invites her to go skating with him and his current mistress, Liane d'Exelmans. The event ends in disaster when Gigi tells Gaston she finds Liane boring and uninteresting. Gaston also suspects Liane of having an affair with her skating instructor.

Gaston turns to his uncle Honoré for advice on ending his relationship with Liane. Gaston pays the instructor to leave Liane before ending their relationship permanently. Encouraged by Honoré, Gaston participates heavily in Paris social life to show he is unaffected by ending the relationship. He does not visit Mme. Alvarez for weeks during this time, but Gigi follows his adventures in the newspapers.

Gaston unexpectedly reappears at Mme. Alvarez' apartment, bringing champagne and chocolate. He announces that he will soon be leaving Paris for a while, traveling to a seaside resort. Gigi bets that if she beats him at a game of cards he must bring her and Mme. Alvarez with him to the coast. Gigi wins and Gaston fulfills his promise. Honoré also accompanies them.

Alicia is furious that Gigi has been socializing with Gaston when her education is incomplete. The two elderly ladies decide that Gigi should be kept away from Gaston during her training. When Gaston travels to Monte Carlo for a few weeks, Gigi is instructed every day in the art of conversation, fashion, and etiquette. She takes on a more subtle, composed persona, which is a great disappointment to Gaston when he returns. In an effort to reverse the process, he invites Gigi to join him at a popular but questionable club for tea. Her grandmother prevents her from going, not wanting Gigi's reputation soiled.

Gaston is offended, but gradually realizes Gigi indeed has matured into a desirable young woman. An agreement is reached between him and the two elderly ladies to make Gigi his formal mistress. Gigi is not consulted and refuses to take part. Gaston then admits that he has fallen in love with her. Gigi is shocked and upset, accusing Gaston of not caring enough about her to have entered into such an agreement in the first place. They part on bad terms.

However, Gigi eventually relents and sends Gaston a note, accepting his agreement, not wanting to lose him entirely. Gaston returns, and they leave for a social event. Gaston, bothered by Gigi's sophisticated behavior, brings her home early, unsure about continuing the agreement. After wandering the streets of Paris for hours, Gaston ultimately returns and asks for Gigi's hand in marriage.

== Cast ==
- Yvonne de Bray as Mamita
- Gaby Morlay as Tante Alicia
- Jean Tissier as Honoré
- Franck Villard as Gaston
- Danièle Delorme as Gilberte dite 'Gigi'
- Paul Demange as Emmanuel
- Madeleine Rousset as Liane d'Exelmans
- Pierre Juvenet as Monsieur Lachaille
- Michel Flamme as Sandomir
- Colette Georges as Minouche
- Yolande Laffon as Madame Lachaille
- Hélène Pépée as Andrée
