= Dark Sunday =

1948 film

- Directed by: Jacqueline Audry
- Written by: André Haguet; Pierre Laroche; André Legrand
- Produced by: Claude Dolbert
- Starring: Michèle Alfa; Paul Bernard; Marcelle Derrien
- Cinematography: Gérard Perrin
- Edited by: Pierre Delannoy
- Music by: Marcel Landowski
- Production company: Codo Cinema
- Distributed by: Selb Films
- Release date: 17 November 1948
- Running time: 84 minutes
- Country: France
- Language: French

Dark Sunday (French: Sombre dimanche) is a 1948 French drama film directed by Jacqueline Audry and starring Michèle Alfa, Paul Bernard and Marcelle Derrien. The film takes its name from the French title of the song "Gloomy Sunday".

The film's sets were designed by the art director Raymond Druart.

== Synopsis ==
In pre-war France, a Hungarian immigrant musician is left so saddened when he is rejected by the woman he loves that he writes an incredibly gloomy piece of music. A music publisher is impressed with it and decides to promote using a marketing gimmick. He will get a woman to pretend to attempt suicide because she is so moved by the song.

== Cast ==
- Michèle Alfa as Michèle
- Paul Bernard as Bob
- Jacques Dacqmine as Jan Laszlo
- Marcel Dalio as Max - l'éditeur
- Marcelle Derrien as Maria
- Colette Mars as Colette - une chanteurse
- Charles Lemontier as Le commissaire de police
- Edmond Ardisson as Le portier
- Alfred Baillou as Toni
- Jean Debray as Un journaliste
- Jean-Jacques Dreux as Roger
- Annette Lajon as Une chanteuse
- Palmyre Levasseur as La logeuse
- Julien Maffre as Un policier
- Renaud Mary as César
- Gilbert Moreau as Un photographe
- Georges Paulais as Le directeur
- Michel Seldow as Le brocanteur
- Sylvain as Un chanteur
- Roger Vincent as Un monsieur
- André Pasdoc as Un chanteur

== Bibliography ==
- Bessy, Maurice & Chirat, Raymond. Histoire du cinéma français: encyclopédie des films, 1940–1950. Pygmalion, 1986
