= Georges Paulais =

French actor

- Born: 16 September 1884; Guimps, Charente, France
- Died: 12 December 1967 (aged 83); Chabanais, Charente, France
- Occupation: Actor
- Years active: 1910–1956

Georges Paulais (16 September 1884 – 12 December 1967) was a French film actor. He appeared in more than 140 films between 1910 and 1956. He was born in Guimps, Charente, France and died in Chabanais, Charente, France.

== Selected filmography ==
- Le droit à la vie (1917)
- The Zone of Death (1917)
- El Dorado (1921)
- The Lady of Lebanon (1926)
- Change of Heart (1928)
- The Divine Voyage (1929)
- Saint Joan the Maid (1929)
- Accused, Stand Up! (1930)
- Departure (1931)
- Checkmate (1931)
- Lilac (1932)
- Prince Jean (1934)
- Gold in the Street (1934)
- Last Hour (1934)
- Cease Firing (1934)
- Rothchild (1934)
- The Bread Peddler (1934)
- Les yeux noirs (1935)
- The Brighton Twins (1936)
- 27 Rue de la Paix (1936)
- Moutonnet (1936)
- Beethoven's Great Love (1937)
- The Red Dancer (1937)
- The Secrets of the Red Sea (1937)
- Prince of My Heart (1938)
- Rasputin (1938)
- The Postmaster's Daughter (1938)
- White Nights in Saint Petersburg (1938)
- Heroes of the Marne (1938)
- The Rebel (1938)
- Princess Tarakanova (1938)
- Ultimatum (1938)
- Sacred Woods (1939)
- Immediate Call (1939)
- The Path of Honour (1939)
- Whirlwind of Paris (1939)
- Vidocq (1939)
- His Uncle from Normandy (1939)
- Radio Surprises (1940)
- Facing Destiny (1940)
- Those of the Sky (1941)
- The Black Diamond (1941)
- Mahlia the Mestiza (1943)
- Vautrin (1943)
- The Exile's Song (1943)
- The Midnight Sun (1943)
- A Cage of Nightingales (1945)
- The Queen's Necklace (1946)
- Special Mission (1946)
- The Royalists (1947)
- City of Hope (1948)
- Impeccable Henri (1948)
- The Woman I Murdered (1948)
- The Secret of Monte Cristo (1948)
- The Cavalier of Croix-Mort (1948)
- Dark Sunday (1948)
- Doctor Laennec (1949)
- The Widow and the Innocent (1949)
- Bed for Two; Rendezvous with Luck (1950)
- Quay of Grenelle (1950)
- Sending of Flowers (1950)
- Rome Express (1950)
- Julie de Carneilhan (1950)
- The Little Cardinals (1951)
- Gigolo (1951)
- The Darling of His Concierge (1951)
- Piédalu in Paris (1951)
- The Lovers of Bras-Mort (1951)
- Alone in the World (1952)
- The Lottery of Happiness (1953)
