= Sending of Flowers =

1950 film

- Directed by: Jean Stelli
- Written by: Charles Exbrayat
- Produced by: Claude Dolbert
- Starring: Tino Rossi; Micheline Francey; Jean Brochard; Albert Dinan
- Cinematography: Marc Fossard
- Edited by: Pierre Delannoy
- Production company: Coco Cinema
- Distributed by: CCFC
- Release date: 26 May 1950
- Running time: 102 minutes
- Country: France
- Language: French

Sending of Flowers (French: Envoi de fleurs) is a 1950 French historical drama film directed by Jean Stelli and starring Tino Rossi, Micheline Francey and Jean Brochard. The film portrays the life of the composer Paul Delmet.

== Cast ==
- Tino Rossi as Paul Delmet
- Micheline Francey as Suzanne
- Jean Brochard as Hippolyte
- Albert Dinan as Rodolphe Salis
- Arlette Merry as Sophie
- Milly Mathis as Mme Sammos
- André Dumas as Albert Mourssac
- André Marnay as Le curé
- Charles Lemontier as Fragerolles, un membre du 'Chat noir'
- Jean Berton as Un membre du 'Chat noir'
- Yvonne Dany
- Paul Demange as Un spectateur timoré
- Monique Gérard
- Mag-Avril as Une bourgeoise
- René Marc]as Un membre du 'Chat noir'
- Frédéric Mariotti as Le plâtrier
- Georges Paulais as Un bourgeois
- Hélène Pépée
- Hélène Rémy
- Renée Thorel]
- Edmond Van Daële as Le bedeau

== Bibliography ==
- Rège, Philippe. Encyclopedia of French Film Directors, Volume 1. Scarecrow Press, 2009.
