= Chéri (1950 film) =

1950 film

- Directed by: Pierre Billon
- Written by: Pierre Laroche
- Based on: Chéri by Colette
- Produced by: Claude Dolbert
- Starring: Marcelle Chantal; Jean Desailly; Marcelle Derrien
- Cinematography: Nikolai Toporkoff
- Edited by: Andrée Danis; Suzanne Girardin
- Music by: Marcel Landowski
- Production company: Codo Cinéma
- Distributed by: Compagnie Commerciale Française Cinématographique
- Release date: 28 June 1950
- Running time: 90 minutes
- Country: France
- Language: French

Chéri is a 1950 French comedy drama film directed by Pierre Billon and starring Marcelle Chantal, Jean Desailly and Marcelle Derrien. It is based on the 1920 novel of the same title by Colette. The film's sets were designed by the art director[Raymond Druart.

== Cast ==
- Marcelle Chantal as Léa de Lonval
- Jean Desailly as Fred Peloux, dit Chéri
- Marcelle Derrien as Edmée
- Jane Marken as Charlotte Peloux
- Jane Faber as Lili
- Made Siamé as Rose
- Mag-Avril as Mme Aldonza
- Maïa Poncet as La baronne
- Suzanne Dantès as Marie-Laure
- Yvonne de Bray as La Copine

== Bibliography ==
- Goble, Alan. The Complete Index to Literary Sources in Film. Walter de Gruyter, 1999.
- Rège, Philippe. Encyclopedia of French Film Directors, Volume 1. Scarecrow Press, 2009.
