= The Secret of Monte Cristo =

1948 film

- Directed by: Albert Valentin
- Written by: Pierre Laroche; Denis Marion; Léon Treich
- Produced by: Claude Dolbert
- Starring: Pierre Brasseur; Georges Vitray; Pierre Larquey
- Cinematography: Robert Batton
- Music by: Marcel Landowski
- Production company: Codo Cinéma
- Distributed by: Les Distributeurs Internationeaux de Films
- Release date: 17 September 1948
- Running time: 85 minutes
- Country: France
- Language: French

The Secret of Monte Cristo (French: Le secret de Monte-Cristo) is a 1948 French historical drama film directed by Albert Valentin and starring Pierre Brasseur, Georges Vitray and Pierre Larquey. The film is based on the purported real story behind the Alexandre Dumas novel The Count of Monte Cristo.

== Cast ==
- Pierre Brasseur as François Picault
- Georges Vitray as Gervais Chambard
- Pierre Larquey as Jacob Muller
- Marcelle Derrien as Isabelle
- Madeleine Lebeau as Marguerite Vigouroux
- Edmond Ardisson as Guilhem Savori
- Robert Dalban as Mathieu Loupian
- Marcel Delaître as La'abbé Farina
- Liliane Guyot as La marquise
- Charles Lemontier as Antoine Hallu
- Julien Maffre as Le policier
- Jacqueline Marbaux as Jeanne Hallu
- René Marc as Le médecin
- Jean Marsan as Le vendeur
- Georges Paulais as Le préfet
- Gilles Quéant as Rémi
- Émile Ronet as Monsieur Bastien
- Georges Saint-Val as Le voisin
- Victor Vina as Le maire
- René Wilmet as Alexandre Dumas

== Bibliography ==
- Bessy, Maurice & Chirat, Raymond. Histoire du cinéma français: encyclopédie des films, 1940–1950. Pygmalion, 1986
