= The Unexpected Voyager =

1950 film

- Directed by: Jean Stelli
- Written by: Jean Stelli
- Based on: Mauvaise Graine by Billy Wilder and Max Kolpé
- Produced by: Georges Bernier
- Starring: Georges Marchal; Dany Robin; Lucienne Le Marchand
- Cinematography: Robert Lefebvre
- Edited by: Andrée Laurent
- Production company: La Société des Films Sirius
- Distributed by: La Société des Films Sirius
- Release date: 13 January 1950
- Running time: 88 minutes
- Country: France
- Language: French

The Unexpected Voyager (French: La voyageuse inattendue) is a 1950 French crime film directed by Jean Stelli and starring Georges Marchal, Dany Robin and Lucienne Le Marchand. It is a remake of the 1934 film Mauvaise Graine. The film's sets were designed by the art director Jacques Colombier.

== Synopsis ==
Marc a photographer tries to reform Dany a car thief and get her a job as a model but she is drawn back into a life of crime by her former gang members.

== Cast ==
- Georges Marchal as Marc Lanson
- Dany Robin as Dany
- Lucienne Le Marchand as Hélène
- Jean Tissier as Jacques
- Albert Dinan as Dudule
- Robert Berri as Paolo
- René Hell as Adrien
- Ginette Baudin as Pamela
- Maurice Ledoux as Le troisième gangster
- Nicolas Amato as Le maître d'hôtel
- Raoul Marco as Dupont
- Maxime Fabert as Edouard
- Jacques Beauvais as Le garçon

== Bibliography ==
- McBride, Joseph. Billy Wilder: Dancing on the Edge. Columbia University Press, 2021.
- Oscherwitz, Dayna & Higgins, MaryEllen. The A to Z of French Cinema. Scarecrow Press, 2009.
