= The Cavalier of Croix-Mort =

1948 film

- Directed by: Lucien Ganier-Raymond
- Written by: Pierre Laroche
- Based on: Le Vinaigre des quatre-voleurs by Albert Jean
- Produced by: Charles de Grenier
- Starring: Henri Nassiet; Madeleine Robinson; Yves Vincent
- Cinematography: Maurice Pecqueux
- Edited by: Monique Lacombe
- Music by: Henri Verdun
- Production company: Simoun Films
- Distributed by: Consortium du Film
- Release date: 14 April 1948
- Running time: 90 minutes
- Country: France
- Language: French

The Cavalier of Croix-Mort (French: Le cavalier de Croix-Mort) is a 1948 French historical crime drama film directed by Lucien Ganier-Raymond and starring Henri Nassiet, Madeleine Robinson and Yves Vincent. The film's sets were designed by the art director Roland Quignon.

== Synopsis ==
François d'Anthar returns home to find his wife Élisabeth in the arms of another man, Simon de Chabre. Enraged he wounds the man but Élisabeth's sister Lucile claims that he was there to see her. To maintain the pretence she becomes engaged to Simon. This provokes Élisabeth's jealousy and she arranges to have him kidnapped by hired thugs. The investigating police officer Eugène François Vidocq is able to solve the case and bring Simon and Lucile together again.

== Cast ==
- Henri Nassiet as Vidocq
- Madeleine Robinson as Élisabeth d'Anthar
- Yves Vincent as Simon de Chabre
- Frank Villard as François d'Anthar
- Simone Valère as Lucile
- Georges Paulais as Le préfet
- Suzanne Dantès as Joséphine-Marie
- Katherine Kath as Sandrine
- André Valmy as Coco-Latour
- Jean d'Yd as Louis-Antoine
- Pierre Sergeol as Le boulanger
- Gaston Modot as Augustin
- Léon Bary as Le commissaire
- Jean Diéner as Germain

== Bibliography ==
- Goble, Alan. The Complete Index to Literary Sources in Film. Walter de Gruyter, 1999.
- Rège, Philippe. Encyclopedia of French Film Directors, Volume 1. Scarecrow Press, 2009.
