= Albert Valentin =

Belgian film director (1902–1968)

- Born: 1908; La Louvière, Belgium
- Died: 1968 (aged 59–60); Paris, France
- Occupations: Screenwriter, film director

Albert Valentin (1908–1968) was a Belgian screenwriter and film director.

== Selected filmography ==
- Song of Farewell (1934)
- Stradivarius (1935)
- The Strange Monsieur Victor (1938)
- Sins of Youth (1941)
- Marie-Martine (1943)
- The Secret of Monte Cristo (1948)
- The Little Zouave (1950)
- Serenade to the Executioner (1951)
- Mammy (1951)
- Madame du Barry (1954)
- The Affair of the Poisons (1955)
- Murder at 45 R.P.M. (1960)
- The Changing of the Guard (1962)
- Destination Rome (1963)
