= Charles Lemontier =

French actor

- Born: 21 April 1894; Toul, Lorraine, France
- Died: 28 May 1965 (aged 71); Paris, France
- Occupation: Actor
- Years active: 1931-1962 (film)

Charles Lemontier (1894–1965) was a French film actor.

== Selected filmography ==
- Street Without a Name (1934)
- Judex (1934)
- Crime and Punishment (1935)
- Rigolboche (1936)
- School for Journalists (1936)
- When Midnight Strikes (1936)
- You Can't Fool Antoinette (1936)
- The Assault (1936)
- Seven Men, One Woman (1936)
- Francis the First (1937)
- Gigolette (1937)
- Three Waltzes (1938)
- The Little Thing (1938)
- In the Sun of Marseille (1938)
- Alexis, Gentleman Chauffeur (1938)
- Monsieur Breloque Has Disappeared (1938)
- The Fatted Calf (1939)
- Prince Bouboule (1939)
- My Aunt the Dictator (1939)
- Case of Conscience (1939)
- Eight Men in a Castle (1942)
- Malaria (1943)
- The White Truck (1943)
- Shot in the Night (1943)
- Lucrèce (1943)
- White Wings (1943)
- The Ménard Collection (1944)
- Mademoiselle X (1945)
- The Eternal Husband (1946)
- Roger la Honte (1946)
- Night Warning (1946)
- Mandrin (1947)
- Mirror (1947)
- Dark Sunday (1948)
- Convicted (1948)
- Ruy Blas (1948)
- The Secret of Monte Cristo (1948)
- The Secret of Mayerling (1949)
- The Red Angel (1949)
- Sending of Flowers (1950)
- Minne (1950)
- Born of Unknown Father (1950)
- Farewell Mister Grock (1950)
- Prelude to Glory (1950)
- Amédée (1950)
- Atoll K (1951)
- The Darling of His Concierge (1951)
- Piédalu in Paris (1951)
- The Little Cardinals (1951)
- Maria of the End of the World (1951)
- In the Land of the Sun (1952)
- Run Away Mr. Perle (1952)
- Piédalu Works Miracles (1952)
- My Wife, My Cow and Me (1952)
- Trial at the Vatican (1952)
- The Porter from Maxim's (1953)
- Little Jacques (1953)
- April Fools' Day (1954)
- Operation Thunder (1954)
- It Happened in Aden (1956)
- In the Manner of Sherlock Holmes (1956)
- Lovers of Paris (1957)
- The Enigma of the Folies-Bergere (1959)

== Bibliography ==
- Norbert Aping. The Final Film of Laurel and Hardy: A Study of the Chaotic Making and Marketing of Atoll K. McFarland, 2008.
