= Roger Vincent =

French actor (1878–1959)

- Roger Vincent in The Earrings of Madame De... (1953)
- Born: Henri Roger Sorin; May 1, 1878; Paris, France
- Died: November 8, 1959 (aged 81); Paris, France
- Occupation: Actor
- Years active: 1910–1959

Roger Vincent (1878–1959) was a French actor who acted in over 100 movies over five decades.

== Selected filmography ==
- The Master Valet (1941)
- The Stairs Without End (1943)
- The White Waltz (1943)
- The Man Who Sold His Soul (1943)
- Her Final Role (1946)
- The Murderer is Not Guilty (1946)
- Dropped from Heaven (1946)
- The Queen's Necklace (1946)
- Dreams of Love (1947)
- Mandrin (1947)
- Dilemma of Two Angels (1948)
- The Woman I Murdered (1948)
- Dark Sunday (1948)
- Just Me (1950)
- The Agony of the Eagles (1952)
- Yours Truly, Blake (1954)
- I'll Get Back to Kandara (1956)
