= The Man from Jamaica =

1950 film

- Directed by: Maurice de Canonge
- Written by: Jacques Companéez; Robert Gaillard (novel); Louis Martin
- Produced by: André Halley des Fontaines
- Starring: Pierre Brasseur; Véra Norman; Georges Tabet
- Cinematography: Lucien Joulin
- Edited by: Louis Devaivre
- Music by: Louiguy
- Production company: Bellair Films
- Distributed by: L'Alliance Générale de Distribution Cinématographique
- Release date: 22 December 1950
- Running time: 120 minutes
- Country: France
- Language: French

The Man from Jamaica (French: L'homme de la Jamaïque) is a 1950 French adventure film directed by Maurice de Canonge and starring Pierre Brasseur, Véra Norman and Georges Tabet. The film's sets were designed by the art director Robert Dumesnil. It was shot on location in Paris and Tangiers in Morocco.

== Synopsis ==
A smuggler known as the "Man from Jamaica" arrives in Tangier and meets an attractive young woman who turns out to be related to one of his rivals.

== Cast ==
- Pierre Brasseur as Jacques Mervel
- Véra Norman as Vicky Blanchard
- Georges Tabet as Pablo Lopez
- Marcelle Géniat as Madame Milleris
- Louis Seigner as Capitaine Hoggan
- Nicolas Amato as Le domestique de Lopez
- Jean-Roger Caussimon as Docteur Van Boeken
- Jany Vallières as Marguerite
- Simone Laure as Anita
- Félix Oudart as Le commissaire
- Jean Pignol as Navari
- Daniel Lecourtois as Docteur Marc Heckart
- Alexandre Rignault as Rapal

== Bibliography ==
- Goble, Alan. The Complete Index to Literary Sources in Film. Walter de Gruyter, 1999.
