= Agnes of Nothing =

1950 film

- Directed by: Pierre Billon
- Written by: Pierre Billon; Jacques Natanson
- Based on: Agnes of Nothing by Germaine Beaumont
- Produced by: Claude Dolbert
- Starring: Danièle Delorme; Yvonne de Bray; Paul Meurisse
- Cinematography: Nikolai Toporkoff
- Edited by: Andrée Danis; Suzanne Girardin
- Music by: Marcel Landowski
- Production company: Codo Cinéma
- Distributed by: Union Française de Production Cinématographique
- Release date: 17 March 1950
- Running time: 95 minutes
- Country: France
- Language: French

Agnes of Nothing (French: Agnès de rien) is a 1950 French drama film directed by Pierre Billon and starring Danièle Delorme, Yvonne de Bray and Paul Meurisse. It is based on the novel of the same title by Germaine Beaumont. It was shot at the Billancourt Studios in Paris. The film's sets were designed by the art director Raymond Druart.

== Cast ==
- Danièle Delorme as Agnès de Chaligny
- Yvonne de Bray as Madame de Chaligny
- Paul Meurisse as Carlos de Chaligny
- Ketti Gallian as Alix
- Jane Morlet as La Jussaude

== Bibliography ==
- Goble, Alan. The Complete Index to Literary Sources in Film. Walter de Gruyter, 1999.
- Rège, Philippe. Encyclopedia of French Film Directors, Volume 1. Scarecrow Press, 2009.
