= One Only Loves Once =

1950 film

- Directed by: Jean Stelli
- Written by: Jean Le Vitte; Michel Audiard; Charles Exbrayat
- Based on: La Caille by Paul Vialar
- Produced by: René Dary; Aimé Frapin; Hervé Missir
- Starring: Françoise Rosay; Renée Faure; Marcel Herrand
- Cinematography: Paul Cotteret
- Edited by: Andrée Laurent
- Music by: Louiguy
- Production companies: Consortium de Productions de Films; Ciné Reportages
- Distributed by: Consortium du Film
- Release date: 9 June 1950
- Running time: 82 minutes
- Country: France
- Language: French

One Only Loves Once (French: On n'aime qu'une fois) is a 1950 French drama film directed by Jean Stelli and starring Françoise Rosay, Renée Faure and Marcel Herrand. It was based on a novel by Paul Vialar. The film's sets were designed by the art director Lucien Carré.

== Synopsis ==
Danièle, a young woman, dreams of marrying her childhood friend Jean Monnier. His mother wishing to prevent the match sends him away to Paris to study to become a surgeon. Left alone Danièle is forced to marry the only suitor available, who subsequently takes her money and abandons her. In order to bring back her true love to her she arranges to be injured.

== Cast ==
- Françoise Rosay as Louise Monnier
- Renée Faure as Danièle de Bolestac
- Marcel Herrand as Hyacinthe Carrier
- Pierre Larquey as Le docteur Ravenel
- Jacques Berthier as Jean Monnier
- Marcel Raine as Gouttemel
- Robert Lussac as Le professeur Trousselier
- René Hell as Le cabaretier
- Jean Nosserot as Un docteur
- Mady Berry as Marie - La bonne des de Bolestac
- Henri Nassiet as Le marquis Antoine de Bolestac
- Dominique Davray as La fille au café-restaurant

== Bibliography ==
- Goble, Alan. The Complete Index to Literary Sources in Film. Walter de Gruyter, 1999.
- Rège, Philippe. Encyclopedia of French Film Directors, Volume 1. Scarecrow Press, 2009.
