= Three Investigations =

1948 film

- Directed by: Claude Orval
- Written by: Marc Blanquet; Jacques Chabannes; Georges Jaffé
- Produced by: Claude Dolbert
- Starring: Antonin Berval; Suzy Prim; Junie Astor
- Cinematography: Marc Bujard
- Edited by: Renée Guérin
- Music by: Marcel Landowski
- Production company: Codo Cinéma
- Distributed by: Filmonde
- Release date: 30 June 1948
- Running time: 82 minutes
- Country: France
- Language: French

Three Investigations (French: Triple enquête) is a 1948 French crime film directed by Claude Orval and starring Antonin Berval, Suzy Prim and Junie Astor. The film's sets were designed by the art directors Aimé Bazin and Louis Le Barbenchon.

== Synopsis ==
Inspector Thomas of the Surete investigates three separate cases including theft, murder and the kidnapping of a child.

== Cast ==
- Antonin Berval as L'inspecteur de police Thomas
- Suzy Prim as Irène
- Junie Astor as Madame Robert
- Fernand Fabre as Le docteur Justin
- Georges Vitray as Le docteur Robert
- Gustave Gallet as Le commissaire de police Gribaudet
- Dorette Ardenne as Gaby
- Rivers Cadet as Le complice
- Simone Cerdan as L'infirmière
- Maurice Lagrenée as Jean Fournier
- Palmyre Levasseur as La patronne de l'hôtel
- Philippe Richard as Latanière
- Raymond Soguet as Max
- Madeleine Suffel as La standardiste
- Victor Vina as Le juge d'instruction

== Bibliography ==
- Bessy, Maurice & Chirat, Raymond. Histoire du cinéma français: encyclopédie des films, 1940–1950. Pygmalion, 1986
- Rège, Philippe. Encyclopedia of French Film Directors, Volume 1. Scarecrow Press, 2009.
