= Amédée (film) =

1950 film

- Directed by: Gilles Grangier
- Written by: Robert Beauvais; Gilles Grangier
- Produced by: Jean Darvey
- Starring: Rellys; Annette Poivre; Robert Arnoux
- Cinematography: Maurice Pecqueux
- Edited by: Andrée Danis
- Music by: Jean Marion
- Production company: Les Films Carnot
- Distributed by: Les Films Marceau
- Release date: 15 February 1950
- Running time: 87 minutes
- Country: France
- Language: French

Amédée is a 1950 French comedy film directed by Gilles Grangier and starring Rellys, Annette Poivre and Robert Arnoux. It was shot at the Photosonor Studios in Paris. The film's sets were designed by the art director Jacques Colombier.

== Synopsis ==
Amédée, the sales director of a beauty salon, is given a serum which compels him to blurt out the unvarnished truth for the next two days. He makes a string of revelations to customers, his wife and, the tax authorities.

== Cast ==
- Rellys as Amédée
- Annette Poivre as Amélie
- Robert Arnoux as Mareuil
- Julien Carette as Ange-Louis
- Jeannette Batti as Jacqueline
- Christine Hayrel as Monique Castapoul
- François Joux as Le docteur
- Marcel Pérès as Castapoul
- André Bervil as Georges
- Georges Tourreil as Un inspecteur
- Charles Lemontier as M. Legros
- Marcel Delaître as Un inspecteur
- Paul Azaïs as Le photographe
- Gaston Gabaroche as Le médecin légiste
- Jean Clarieux as Étienne
- René Worms as Un ami
- Madeleine Gérôme as Une vendeuse
- Pauline Carton as Tante Eugénie

== Bibliography ==
- Bessy, Maurice & Chirat, Raymond. Histoire du cinéma français: encyclopédie des films, 1940–1950. Pygmalion, 1986
- Rège, Philippe. Encyclopedia of French Film Directors, Volume 1. Scarecrow Press, 2009.
