= Jacqueline Audry =

French film director (1908–1977)

- Born: 25 September 1908; Orange, Vaucluse, France
- Died: 22 June 1977 (aged 68); Poissy, Yvelines, France
- Occupation: Film director
- Years active: 1946–1973
- Spouse: Pierre Laroche

Jacqueline Audry (25 September 1908 – 22 June 1977) was a French film director who began making films in post-World War II France and specialised in literary adaptations that centered women. She was the first commercially successful female director of post-war France.

== Early life and family ==
Audry was born in Orange, Vaucluse, France. She was born into an upper class family. Her sister, Colette Audry, was a novelist and screenwriter and her great uncle Gaston Doumergue served as both President of the Republic and Prime Minister of France. After initially setting her hopes on becoming an actress, she decided that she wanted to be behind the camera.

== Career ==
=== Early years ===
From 1931 to 1942 she worked as a "script girl" and assistant to directors Jean Delannoy, G. W. Pabst and Max Ophüls on twenty five films. There were few opportunities for female directors during the Nazi occupation. Audry directed her first short film, Le Feu de paille (1943), a documentary about the transhumance of wild horses in the Vercors Mountains, with the help of the Centre Artistique et Technique des Jeunes du Cinéma (now La Femis). The end of World War II and the liberation of France provided increased opportunities for women, but they still faced prejudice in the film industry.

=== Feature films ===
Audry's first feature film was Les Malheurs de Sophie (1946). This was based on the popular novel of the same name by the Comtesse de Ségur. No copies of this film, which was censored for its "politically inappropriate" riot scenes, exist. Unable to raise funds for her next film, she had to wait a couple of years before making Sombre dimanche (1948). In the 1940s and 1950s, she directed three films based on Colette novels; Gigi (1949), Minne (1950) and Mitsou (1956), all three with actress Danièle Delorme. Gigi's success garnered Audry industry acclaim as well larger budgets for her future films. Mitsou, which featured sex outside of marriage, was heavily censored.

Audry directed The Pit of Loneliness (Olivia, 1951), based on Dorothy Bussy's 1950 semi-autobiographical novel, Olivia. Set in an all-girls boarding school, The Pit of Loneliness depicts a lesbian love story between a schoolgirl and her headmistress. At the time, the film was very controversial and was censored in the United States and the United Kingdom. Edwige Feuillère was nominated for a BAFTA award for Best Foreign Actress for her part as Mlle. Julie, the headmistress. The film has been called a "landmark of lesbian representation". She often collaborated with Colette Audry, including directing Fruits amers (Bitter Fruit, 1967): an adaptation of her play Soledad (1956).

Audry was married to the screenwriter Pierre Laroche with whom she collaborated on film scripts on a number of occasions.

=== Later years ===
She served as a member of the jury at the Cannes Film Festival in 1963. Audry retired from feature films after Bitter Fruit (1967), but she co-directed with Wojciech Solarz a Polish-French miniseries of the life of Honoré de Balzac in 1973.

== Death ==
Audry died in a road accident in Poissy, Yvelines, France in 1977.

== Filmmaking approach ==
Audry's film style was traditional and at odds with the French New Wave. Her films had a feminist slant however. She has been referred to as an auteur, whose ""invisible" cinematic style" and "sensitivity" brought performance to the forefront in her films. Many of her films have central female characters and they often give a radical view of gender roles and female sexuality. Audry's "classic" directorial approach, "distanc(ed) her subject matter from an overtly sensitive 1950s film viewing public," which may have enabled her to examine "controversial" themes and, "make reasonably popular films about sexually liberated and autonomous women" that stood out from the cinematic landscape of the time.

== Filmography ==
Among the 16 films Audry directed were:

- The Misfortunes of Sophie (1946)
- Dark Sunday (1948)
- Gigi (1949)
- Minne (1950)
- Olivia (US title: The Pit of Loneliness) (1951)
- The Blonde Gypsy (1953)
- Huis clos (No Exit) (1954)
- Mitsou (1956)
- The Flapper (1957)
- It's All Adam's Fault (1958)
- School for Coquettes (1958)
- Le Secret du chevalier d'Éon (1959)
- Girl on the Road (1962)
- Bitter Fruit (1967)

== See also ==
- List of female film and television directors
- List of LGBT-related films directed by women
