= Claude Nicot =

French actor (1925–2003)

- Born: 12 February 1925; Paris, France
- Died: 17 November 2003 (aged 78); Paris, France
- Occupation: Actor
- Years active: 1947–1999

Claude Nicot (12 February 1925 – 17 November 2003) was a French film actor.

== Selected filmography ==
- Minne (1950)
- The Little Cardinals (1951)
- Great Man (1951)
- Mammy (1951)
- The Passage of Venus (1951)
- The Beauty of Cadiz (1953)
- The Lady of the Camellias (1953)
- Thirteen at the Table (1955)
- Fruits of Summer (1955)
- The Duratons (1955)
- Adorable Liar (1962)
- Champagne for Savages (1964)
- The Gardener of Argenteuil (1966)

== Bibliography ==
- Goble, Alan. The Complete Index to Literary Sources in Film. Walter de Gruyter, 1999.
