= The Woman I Murdered =

1948 film

- Directed by: Jacques Daniel-Norman
- Written by: Claude Dolbert; Charles Exbrayat; Pierre Laroche
- Produced by: Jacques Haïk
- Starring: Armand Bernard; Pierre Larquey; Micheline Francey
- Cinematography: René Colas
- Edited by: Pierre Delannoy
- Music by: Marcel Landowski
- Production company: Codo Cinéma
- Distributed by: Les Films Cristal
- Release date: 26 November 1948
- Running time: 91 minutes
- Country: France
- Language: French

The Woman I Murdered (French: La femme que j'ai assassinée) is a 1948 French drama film directed by Jacques Daniel-Norman and starring Armand Bernard, Pierre Larquey and Micheline Francey. The film's sets were designed by the art director Raymond Druart.

== Synopsis ==
After not taking seriously a young woman's threats to commit suicide, a businessman is shocked to read in the newspaper that her body has been discovered in the canal. Filled with remorse, he adopts her orphaned daughter and attempts to make amends through his assistance to her.

== Cast ==
- Armand Bernard as Dupont-Verneuil
- Pierre Larquey as René Dufleuve
- Micheline Francey as Lucienne
- Charles Vanel as François Bachelin
- Rivers Cadet as Le maire
- Jeanne Daury as Simone
- Palmyre Levasseur as La marchande des quatre saisons
- Margo Lion as La logeuse
- Julien Maffre as Le pêcheur
- Philippe Mareuil as Jean
- Jane Marken as Maria Le Querrec
- Georges Paulais as Benjamin
- Robert Pizani as Arthur de Selve
- Philippe Richard as André
- Émile Ronet as Cordier
- Georges Sauval as L'éclusier
- Pierre Stéphen as Raoul Le Hardouin
- Lucy Valnor as Lucienne enfant
- Roger Vincent as Le père de Jean

== Bibliography ==
- Bessy, Maurice & Chirat, Raymond. Histoire du cinéma français: encyclopédie des films, 1940–1950. Pygmalion, 1986
