= Georges Vitray =

French actor

- Born: 28 February 1888; Paris, France
- Died: 8 September 1960 (aged 72); Paris, France
- Other name: Georges Victor Leporcher
- Occupation: Actor
- Years active: 1931–1959 (film)

Georges Vitray (1888–1960) was a French film actor.

== Biography ==
Georges Victor Leporcher was born in Paris, France to Constant Leporcher and Victorine Victoire Bricier. Georges took the name Vitray as a stage name. Georges' mother was born in Bréal-sous-Vitré.

He participated in 46 French films ( with the exception of two co-productions with Germany and Italy in 1954 ) from 1931 to 1958 as well as a TV movie in 1959. He also played in the theater. He received the Knighthood of the Legion of Honour in 1959 for military service during World War I and 43 years of service to the Comédie-Française. He was married to the American author and newspaper editor Laura Vitray (ne Yard). They had a son in 1924, George Alain Vitray.

== Selected filmography ==
- Happy Hearts (1932)
- If I Were Boss (1934)
- The Mysteries of Paris (1935)
- Forty Little Mothers (1936)
- The Tender Enemy (1936)
- Ultimatum (1938)
- Rasputin (1938)
- The Novel of Werther (1938)
- Mollenard (1938)
- Savage Brigade (1939)
- La Symphonie fantastique (1942)
- The Man Who Played with Fire (1942)
- Chiffon's Wedding (1942)
- White Wings (1943)
- Star Without Light (1946)
- Devil and the Angel (1946)
- Mandrin (1947)
- The Secret of Monte Cristo (1948)
- Three Investigations (1948)
- The Nude Woman (1949)
- Maya (1949)
- La Marie du port (1950)
- The Road to Damascus (1952)
- Their Last Night (1953)
- A Woman's Treasure (1953)
- Flesh and the Woman (1954)
- A Double Life (1954)

== Bibliography ==
- Crisp, C.G. The Classic French Cinema, 1930-1960. Indiana University Press, 1993.
