= Frank Villard =

French actor (1917–1980)

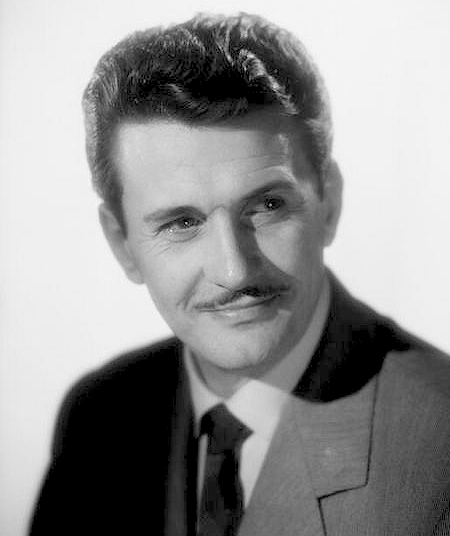
- Born: François Drouineau; 24 March 1917; Saint-Jean-d'Angély, Charente-Maritime, France
- Died: 19 September 1980 (aged 63); Geneva, Switzerland
- Other name: Franck Villard
- Occupation: Actor
- Years active: 1941–1980 (film)

Frank Villard (24 March 1917 – 19 September 1980) was a French film actor. He was born François Drouineau in Saint-Jean-d'Angély.

== Selected filmography ==
- The Last of the Six (1941) - Un homme (uncredited)
- Cartacalha, reine des gitans (1942)
- Feu sacré (1942) - Jean Delmas
- Box of Dreams (1945) - Jean
- The Faceless Enemy (1946) - Inspecteur Wens / Inspector Wens
- The Marriage of Ramuntcho (1947) - Georges Baermann
- The Mysterious Monsieur Sylvain (1947) - Ancelin
- False Identity (1947) - L'inspecteur Rolle
- The Cavalier of Croix-Mort (1948) - François d'Anthar
- Memories Are Not for Sale (1948) - Jean
- The Red Signal (1949) - Ing. Nicolas Riedel
- Gigi (1949) - Gaston
- Vient de paraître (1949) - Maréchal
- Manèges (1950) - François
- Minne (1950) - Antoine
- Shot at Dawn (1950) - Rudolf Hennings
- The Lovers of Bras-Mort (1951) - Jean Michaut
- The Beautiful Image (1951) - Raoul Cérusier / Roland Colbert
- Avalanche (1951) - Edouard Bouchard
- Savage Triangle (1951) - Paul
- The Cape of Hope (1951) - Robert 'Bob' Legeay
- Les Sept Péchés capitaux (1952) - Ravila (segment "Luxure, La / Lust")
- The Shameless Sex (1952) - Stefano Lari
- Voice of Silence (1953) - Mario Rossi
- Mandat d'amener (1953) - Gérard Latour
- Nuits andalouses (1954) - Armand de Puysherbeux
- The Secret of Helene Marimon (1954) - Jacques Taillandier
- Huis clos (1954) - Garcin - une belle gouape
- Boulevard du crime (1955) - Gilbert Renaud
- Girls of Today (1955) - Armando
- Les indiscrètes (1956) - Pierre Fleury
- Je plaide non coupable (1956) - Pierre Lemaire
- Beatrice Cenci (1956) - Giudice Ranieri
- Alerte au deuxième bureau (1956) - Le capitaine Thierry
- Suspicion (1956) - Etienne Jean Marie de Montenoy
- Deuxième bureau contre inconnu (1957) - Capitaine Thierry
- The Mysteries of Paris (1957) - Prince Rodolfo di Gerolstein
- Sylviane de mes nuits (1957) - Michel Lenoir
- The Violet Seller (1958) - Henri Garnard
- Operation Abduction (1958) - Captain Thierry
- The Enigma of the Folies-Bergere (1959) - Le commissaire Raffin
- The Price of Flesh (1959) - Daniel, the journalist
- Deuxième bureau contre terroristes (1961) - Jacques Martin
- El secreto de los hombres azules (1961) - Hernandez
- The Counterfeiters of Paris (1961) - Eric Masson
- Un branco di vigliacchi (1962) - De Rossi
- Le Crime ne paie pas (1962) - M. Lenormand (segment "L'affaire Hugues")
- The Lovely Lola (1962) - Gabriel
- Gigot (1962) - Pierre
- The Gentleman from Epsom (1962) - Lucien
- No temas a la ley (1963) - Jean Farand
- Mata Hari, Agent H21 (1964) - Colonel Emile Pelletier / Legrand
- When the Pheasants Pass (1965) - Chinaud (uncredited)
- How to Keep the Red Lamp Burning (1965) - Marcel Froment (segments "Fermeture, La" and "Procès, Le")
- Black Sun (1966) - Le curé
- Comptes à rebours (1971)
- Apocalypse Now (1979) - Gaston de Marais (Redux and Final Cut versions only)

== Bibliography ==
- Goble, Alan. The Complete Index to Literary Sources in Film. Walter de Gruyter, 1999.
