= Marcelle Derrien =

French actress

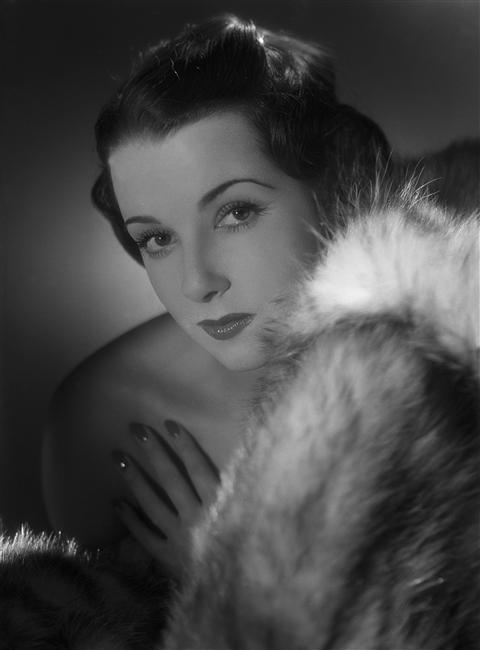
- Derrien in 1948
- Born: 24 July 1916; Saint-Leu-la-Forêt, Val-d'Oise, France
- Died: 2 November 2008 (aged 92)
- Occupation: Actress
- Years active: 1946-1969 (film)

Marcelle Derrien (1916–2008) was a French stage and film actress.

== Selected filmography ==
- Man About Town (1947)
- Impeccable Henri (1948)
- Dark Sunday (1948)
- The Secret of Monte Cristo (1948)
- Chéri (1950)

== Bibliography ==
- Goble, Alan. The Complete Index to Literary Sources in Film. Walter de Gruyter, 1999.
