= Jean Stelli =

French screenwriter and film director (1894-1975)

- Born: 6 December 1894; Lille, France
- Died: 2 February 1975 (aged 80); Grasse, Alpes-Maritimes, France
- Occupations: Director, Screenwriter
- Years active: 1922–1961 (film)

Jean Stelli (6 December 1894 in Lille – 2 February 1975 in Grasse) was a French screenwriter and film director.

== Selected filmography ==
- The Hurricane on the Mountain (1922)
- Durand Jewellers (1938)
- Gibraltar (1938)
- Cristobal's Gold (1940)
- The Blue Veil (1942)
- The White Waltz (1943)
- The Temptation of Barbizon (1946)
- The Mysterious Monsieur Sylvain (1947)
- City of Hope (1948)
- Five Red Tulips (1949)
- Last Love (1949)
- Sending of Flowers (1950)
- One Only Loves Once (1950)
- The Unexpected Voyager (1950)
- Serenade to the Executioner (1951)
- Maria of the End of the World (1951)
- Mammy (1951)
- The Night Is Ours (1953)
- The Lovers of Marianne (1953)
- A Woman's Treasure (1953)
- Baratin (1956)
- Tides of Passion (1956)
- Whereabouts Unknown (1957)
- Operation Abduction (1958)

== Bibliography ==
- Rège, Philippe. Encyclopedia of French Film Directors, Volume 1. Scarecrow Press, 2009.
