= Véra Norman =

French actress (1924–2023)

- Born: 28 December 1924; Paris, France
- Died: 19 May 2023 (aged 98); Saint-Arnoult, Calvados, France
- Other name: Marguerite Trediakowski
- Occupation: Actress
- Years active: 1945–1956 (film)

Marguerite Trediakowski (28 December 1924 – 19 May 2023), better known as Véra Norman, was a French film actress.

Norman died in Saint-Arnoult, Calvados on 19 May 2023, at the age of 98.

== Selected filmography ==
- The Sea Rose (1946)
- The Man from Jamaica (1950)
- Just Me (1950)
- Lady Paname (1950)
- The Little Cardinals (1951)
- Serenade to the Executioner (1951)
- In the Land of the Sun (1952)
- Imperial Violets (1952)
- A Caprice of Darling Caroline (1953)
- This Man Is Dangerous (1953)
- The Pirates of the Bois de Boulogne (1954)
- Stain in the Snow (1954)
- One Bullet Is Enough (1954)

== Bibliography ==
- Goble, Alan. The Complete Index to Literary Sources in Film. Walter de Gruyter, 1999.
