= Cruise for the Unknown One =

- Directed by: Pierre Montazel
- Written by: Pierre Montazel; Maurice Griffe
- Starring: Sophie Desmarets; Claude Dauphin; Pierre Brasseur; Noël Roquevert
- Cinematography: Philippe Agostini
- Edited by: Marguerite Houllé-Renoir
- Music by: Hubert Rostaing
- Distributed by: Gaumont Distribution
- Release date: 1 September 1948
- Running time: 90 minutes
- Country: France
- Language: French

Cruise for the Unknown One (French: Croisière pour l'inconnu) is a French film from 1948, directed by Pierre Montazel, written by Pierre Montazel, and starring Claude Dauphin. Louis de Funès had an uncredited role. The film was based on the novel of G. Vidal L'aventure est à bord.

== Cast ==
- Claude Dauphin as Clément Fournil
- Sophie Desmarets as Marianne Fabre
- Pierre Brasseur as Emile Fréchisse
- Noël Roquevert as Kohlmann
- Albert Rémy as Albert
- Edmond Ardisson as inspector
- Louis de Funès as (uncredited)
