= Bed for Two; Rendezvous with Luck =

1950 film directed by Emil-Edwin Reinert

- Directed by: Emil-Edwin Reinert
- Written by: André-Paul Antoine; Jacques Natanson; Emil E. Reinert
- Produced by: S.B. Films, Silver Films
- Starring: Henri Guisol
- Cinematography: Roger Dormoy
- Edited by: Isabelle Elman
- Music by: Joe Hajos
- Distributed by: Les Films Corona (1950) (France)
- Release date: 23 August 1950
- Running time: 72 minutes
- Country: France
- Language: French

Bed for Two; Rendezvous with Luck (French: Rendez-vous avec la chance) is a French comedy film from 1950, directed by Emil-Edwin Reinert, written by André-Paul Antoine, and starring Henri Guisol. The film features Louis de Funès. It is based on Gilles Dupé's novel Le lit à deux places.

== Cast ==
- Danielle Delorme: Michèle
- Henri Guisol: Robert Bobin
- Suzanne Flon: Blanche Pidoux-Bobin
- Jean Brochard: Mr. Gauffre
- Louis de Funès: the waiter
- Dora Doll : Miss Paulette
- Geneviève Morel: Misses Justin, the concierge
- Georges Paulais: inspector
