= Témoignage =

Témoignage may refer to:

- Témoignage (book), a 2006 book written by French President Nicolas Sarkozy

Témoignages may refer to:

- Témoignages (TV series), a 1973 French TV series by Jean-Marie Périer
- Témoignages (newspaper), a French daily newspaper edited by the Communist Party of Réunion
