= Born of Unknown Father =

- Directed by: Maurice Cloche
- Written by: Maurice Cloche
- Cinematography: Claude Renoir
- Edited by: Renée Gary
- Music by: Wal Berg
- Release date: 1950
- Running time: 75 minutes
- Country: France
- Language: French

Born of Unknown Father (French: Né de père inconnu) is a 1950 French film directed by Maurice Cloche.

== Cast ==
- Yvonne Dany
- Irasema Dilián ... Rose Dormoy
- Gabrielle Dorziat ... Mme. Mussot
- Irene Genna ... Antoinette
- Gilbert Gil ... Raymond Denis
- Jean-Pierre Kérien ... Claude Nogent
- Claude Le Lorrain
- Charles Lemontier ... Le président
- Héléna Manson ... Mme Denis
- Renzo Merusi ... Pierre Neville
- Gaby Morlay ... Mme. Nogent
- Van Mullen ... Maître Mussot
- Sandro Ruffini ... Henri Mussot
- Nicole Stéphane ... Jacqueline Mussot
- Max Tréjean
- Janine Viénot ... La surveillante de l'Assistance Publique
