= Antoine and Antoinette =

1947 film

- Film poster
- French: Antoine et Antoinette
- Directed by: Jacques Becker
- Written by: Jacques Becker; Maurice Griffe; Françoise Giroud
- Produced by: Georges André
- Starring: Roger Pigaut
- Cinematography: Pierre Montazel
- Edited by: Marguerite Renoir
- Music by: Jean-Jacques Grunenwald
- Production company: Gaumont
- Distributed by: Gaumont Distribution
- Release date: 31 October 1947
- Running time: 78 minutes
- Country: France
- Language: French

Antoine and Antoinette (French: Antoine et Antoinette) is a 1947 French comedy film directed by Jacques Becker. It was shot at the Saint-Maurice Studios in Paris. The film's sets were designed by the art director Robert-Jules Garnier. It was entered into the 1947 Cannes Film Festival.

== Synopsis ==
Antoine and Antoinette are a working class family living and working in Paris. He is employed in a printing press and she in a department store. The couple are poor, but have many friends. However, Antoine is jealous of the attention paid to the vivacious Antoinette by other men, despite the fact she is devoted to him. An apparent lottery win seems to have solved their financial problems, until Antoine loses the winning ticket on the Paris Metro.

== Main cast ==
- Roger Pigaut as Antoine Moulin
- Claire Mafféi as Antoinette Moulin
- Noël Roquevert as Mr. Roland
- Gaston Modot as civil servant
- Made Siamé as the shopkeeper's wife
- Pierre Trabaud as Riton
- Jacques Meyran as M. Barbelot
- François Joux as bridegroom
- Gérard Oury as customer
- Charles Camus as the shopkeeper
- Émile Drain as father-in-law
- Annette Poivre as Juliette
