= Woman Without a Past =

Woman Without a Past may refer to:

- Woman Without a Past (1939 film), a German drama film
- Woman Without a Past (1948 film), a French comedy film
