= Happy Go Lucky (1946 film) =

1946 film directed by Marcel L'Herbier

- Directed by: Marcel L'Herbier
- Written by: Marc-Gilbert Sauvajon (play); Françoise Giroud
- Starring: Danielle Darrieux; André Luguet; François Périer
- Cinematography: Jules Kruger; Jacques Mercanton
- Edited by: Louisette Hautecoeur
- Music by: Wal Berg
- Production company: Les Films Gibé
- Distributed by: Pathé Consortium Cinéma
- Release date: 15 May 1946
- Running time: 105 minutes
- Country: France
- Language: French

Happy Go Lucky (French: Au petit bonheur) is a 1946 French comedy film directed by Marcel L'Herbier and starring Danielle Darrieux, André Luguet and François Périer. It was shot at the Neuilly Studios in Paris. The film's sets were designed by the art director Jacques Colombier.

== Cast ==
- Danielle Darrieux as Martine Carignol
- André Luguet as Alain Plessis
- François Périer as Denis Carignol
- Jacques-Henry Duval as Archibald
- Paulette Dubost as Brigitte Ancelin
- Henri Crémieux as Le commissaire
- Fred Pasquali as Germain
- Robert Seller as Benjamin
- Marcel Maupi as Le gargiste
- Claudette Falco as Sophie
- Paul Barge
- Rolande Haumont
- Cécyl Marcyl
- Odette Talazac

== Bibliography ==
- Rège, Philippe. Encyclopedia of French Film Directors, Volume 1. Scarecrow Press, 2009.
