= Antoine and Sebastian =

1974 film

- Directed by: Jean-Marie Périer
- Written by: Jean-Marie Périer; Fernand Pluot; Monique Lange
- Produced by: Michelle de Broca
- Starring: François Périer; Jacques Dutronc; Ottavia Piccolo; Keith Carradine
- Cinematography: Yves Lafaye
- Music by: Jacques Dutronc; François Rauber
- Release date: 1974
- Language: French

Antoine and Sebastian (French: Antoine et Sébastien) is a 1974 French comedy-drama film directed by Jean-Marie Périer and starring François Périer, Jacques Dutronc, Ottavia Piccolo and Keith Carradine.

== Cast ==
- François Périer as Antoine
- Jacques Dutronc as Sébastien
- Ottavia Piccolo as Nathalie
- Keith Carradine as John
- Marisa Pavan as Mathilde
- Marie Dubois as Corinne
- Pierre Tornade as Max
- Jacques François as The Captain
- Hadi Kalafate as Gamelle
- Jean Michaud as The Editor
- Olivier Hussenot as Géraldi
- Francine Custer as Jérichote
- Robert Deslandes as Raymond
- Oreste Lionello as Ledieu
