= Anne-Marie Périer =

French journalist

- Born: 5 April 1945 (age 80)
- Occupation: Journalist
- Spouse: Michel Sardou (m. 1999)
- Children: 2
- Parents: François Périer; Jacqueline Porel
- Relatives: Jean-Marie Périer and Marc Porel (half-brothers); Gabrielle Réjane (great-grandmother)

Anne-Marie Périer-Sardou (née Périer, commonly known as Anne-Marie Périer; born 5 April 1945) is a French journalist. She is the daughter of Jacqueline Porel and François Périer.

== Biography ==
Anne-Marie Périer is the sister of Jean-Pierre Périer, who died in 1966, and the half-sister of Jean-Marie Périer and Marc Porel (died in 1983). José Artur was her tutor. She has 2 sons with Claude Barrois: Paul and Mathias, as well as 2 grandsons, Antoine and Abel.

She is most well known for having been the editor-in-chief of the magazine Mademoiselle Âge Tendre, but mostly for Elle. Franka Berger, sister of Michel Berger, replaced her position under a pseudonym, at her request, at Europe 1, for a fashion segment.

She helped arrange for 2 actresses to appear on the cover of Elle: Sandrine Kiberlain and Emmanuelle Béart.

Périer married Michel Sardou on 11 October 1999, in Neuilly-sur-Seine.

== Publications ==
- Périer, Anne-Marie (1967). Belles, belles, belles... (in French). Le Livre de poche.
- Périer, Anne-Marie; Bauby, Jean-Dominique (1999). Les Années Elle: 1945-2000 (in French). Filipacchi. ISBN 9782850186813.
