= Renée Gary =

French film editor

- Occupation: Film editor
- Years active: 1946–1960

Renée Gary was a French film editor active in the 1940s through the early 1960s. She worked on several films by Maurice Cloche.

== Selected filmography ==
- The Spy Catcher (1960)
- Ciné ballets de Paris (1959)
- Nuits andalouses (1954)
- Rayés des vivants (1952)
- Domenica (1952)
- Born of Unknown Father (1950)
- La portatrice di pane (1950)
- Mademoiselle de la Ferté (1949)
- Docteur Laennec (1949)
- Coeur de coq (1946)
- Women's Games (1946)
