= The Temptation of Barbizon =

La Tentation de Barbizon
- Directed by: Jean Stelli
- Written by: André-Paul Antoine; Marc-Gilbert Sauvajon
- Starring: Simone Renant; François Périer
- Cinematography: Marcel Grignon
- Edited by: Claude Nicole
- Music by: René Sylviano
- Distributed by: Consortium du Film
- Release date: 13 March 1946
- Running time: 100 minutes
- Country: France
- Language: French

The Temptation of Barbizon (French: La Tentation de Barbizon) is a French fantasy-romance film from 1946, directed by Jean Stelli, written by André-Paul Antoine and Marc-Gilbert Sauvajon, and starring Simone Renant and François Périer. It was the first film of French actor Louis de Funès, who appeared in a 40-second, uncredited role.

== Plot ==
Martine and Michel are very much in love and have decided to get married, but one evening, their love is put to the test. Two messengers, a demon and an angel, come to their house. Ben Atkinson (the demon) comes first and offers Michel a good job and money. Martine suspects a trick, but Michel is ready to accept the demon's offer. The angel tries to go for help but is stopped by devil, who uses policemen to back him up. At the end, the angel prevents the demon's plans.

== Funès debut ==
De Funès began his show business career in the theatre. In 1945, thanks to his contact with Daniel Gélin, he made his film debut at the age of 31 with a bit part in La Tentation de Barbizon. De Funès' appeared on screen for 40 seconds in the role of the porter of the cabaret Le Paradis. De Funès receives the character of Jérôme Chambon at the entrance of the cabaret and invites him to enter by a downstairs door, saying "C'est par ici Monsieur" ("This way, sir"). Chambon declines the invitation, wanting to try to enter through the front door of the room instead, but since that door is closed, he crashes into it. De Funès then says: "Ben, il a son compte celui-là, aujourd'hui" ("He's had enough today, that one").

== Production details ==
The film was produced by the Consortium du Production and filmed at the Studio du Bologne. It was distributed in German theatres by the Internationale Filmallianz (1948) under the title Wenn der Himmel versagt – Der Satan und die Hochzeitsreise ("When the Heavens Fail – Satan and the Honeymoon").

== Cast ==
- Simone Renant : Eva Parker / Angel
- François Périer : Ben Atkinson / Devil
- Pierre Larquey : Jérôme Chambon
- Juliette Faber : Martine
- Daniel Gélin : Michel
- Henri Crémieux : Eva Parker's advocate
- Myno Burnay : Dominique Ancelin, the society's director
- André Bervil : Mr. Stéphane, the gambling gangster
- Jean Wall : the custodial judge
- Jean Berton : the hotel director
- Louis de Funès : hotel porter (uncredited)
