= Last Refuge =

1947 film by Marc Maurette

- Directed by: Marc Maurette
- Written by: Maurice Griffe; Marc Maurette
- Based on: Le Locataire by Georges Simenon
- Starring: Raymond Rouleau
- Cinematography: Léonce-Henri Burel; Jean Bachelet
- Edited by: Marguerite Houlle-Renoir
- Music by: Jean-Jacques Grünenwald
- Release date: 27 August 1947
- Running time: 87 minutes
- Country: France
- Language: French

Last Refuge (French: Dernier refuge) is a 1947 French film directed by Marc Maurette, written by Maurice Griffe and Marc Maurette, and starring Raymond Rouleau. The film featured Louis de Funès in a supporting role.

== Cast ==
- Raymond Rouleau: Philippe
- Giselle Pascal: Antoinette Baron
- Félicien Tramel: Mr. Baron
- Noël Roquevert: Beauchamp
- Mila Parély: Sylvie
- Marcelle Monthil: Mrs. Baron
- Louis de Funès: the driver

== Reception ==
The film wasn't successful.
