= Don't Torture a Duckling =

1972 film by Lucio Fulci

- Theatrical release poster
- Italian: Non si sevizia un paperino
- Directed by: Lucio Fulci
- Screenplay by: Lucio Fulci; Roberto Gianviti; Gianfranco Clerici
- Story by: Lucio Fulci; Roberto Gianviti
- Produced by: Edmondo Amati
- Starring: Florinda Bolkan; Barbara Bouchet; Tomas Milian; Irene Papas; Marc Porel; Georges Wilson
- Cinematography: Sergio D'Offizi
- Edited by: Ornella Micheli
- Music by: Riz Ortolani
- Production company: Medusa Distribuzione
- Distributed by: Medusa Distribuzione
- Release date: 29 September 1972 (Rome)
- Running time: 105 minutes
- Country: Italy
- Language: Italian

Don't Torture a Duckling (Italian: Non si sevizia un paperino) is a 1972 Italian giallo film directed and co-written by Lucio Fulci, and starring Florinda Bolkan, Barbara Bouchet, Tomas Milian, Irene Papas, Marc Porel and Georges Wilson. The plot follows a journalist investigating a series of child murders in an insular Italian village whose residents are riddled with superstition and mistrust. The film's score was composed by Riz Ortolani and features vocals by Ornella Vanoni.

Released on 29 September 1972, the film is significant within Fulci's filmography as it is one of the first in which he began using gore effects, something he would continue to do in his later films. The film has also been noted by critics for its commentary on sexuality in the Catholic Church. Fulci himself considered this to be his best film.

== Plot ==
In Accendura, a small village in Basilicata, Italy, three boys—Bruno, Michele and Tonino—engage in mischief. They catch and taunt Giuseppe Barra, a local simpleton, while he is spying on two locals engaged with visiting prostitutes. Meanwhile, in the hills surrounding the village, Maciara, a reclusive Gypsy witch, conducts black magic ceremonies, first by digging up the skeletal remains of an infant and then plunging pins through the heads of three clay dolls.

When Bruno goes missing, reporters from all over the country converge on the village. Amid local hysteria, Giuseppe is arrested when he picks up a ransom he demanded from Bruno's parents for the boy's return. While he leads the police to Bruno's buried body, he insists he only discovered the body and only phoned the parents in a feeble attempt to extract the surprisingly small ransom. When Tonino's body is found, the police realize that Giuseppe is innocent. A few nights later, during a raging thunderstorm, Michele sneaks out of his house to meet with someone he speaks to over the phone, and he too is murdered by an unseen assailant; his body is found the following morning.

Andrea Martelli, a journalist from Rome, meets and befriends Patrizia, whom he recognizes as a former newspaper reporter from Milan. Patrizia is living at her father's house in the village as she is lying low after a drug scandal. The villagers ostracize Patrizia because of her big-city ways, perceived lack of morality and modern dress style. She also has various seemingly sinister interactions with several children from the town, including Michele, whom she seductively teases, then rejects, while nude. Andrea also meets with the amiable local priest, Don Alberto Avallone, and his reserved mother, Aurelia. Alberto runs a boys' group at the church, which the victims belonged to, and is respected in the area.

The police visit Francesco, an eccentric hermit who practices black magic. Francesco claims to have passed his knowledge to his daughter, Maciara. He is also rumored to have had (and then disposed of) a baby from an incestuous tryst with Maciara. Angered by his unwillingness to co-operate, the police arrest Maciara. Under questioning, she confesses to the murders. However, it appears that she believes her Voodoo dolls and incantations alone caused the deaths, and she professes to have no interest in nor awareness of the physical methods used. An alibi provided by a policeman confirms her innocence. Nonetheless, Maciara is beaten to death by a group of men. The following day, another young boy is found drowned in a local stream.

During further meetings with Alberto, Andrea learns that Alberto's mother, Aurelia, has a six-year-old deaf-mute daughter, Malvina. Andrea becomes convinced that the girl witnessed the killings after seeing that she compulsively pulls the heads off her dolls as if imitating the murders. One doll's head, that of Donald Duck, is found near the latest crime scene. When Aurelia disappears with her daughter, Andrea and Patrizia track her to a shack near the village. When they arrive, Aurelia is found barely conscious, begging them to stop her son. It is revealed that Alberto killed the boys, not for their sins but to prevent them from sinning when they grow up. Alberto attempts to throw his sister off a cliff, but Andrea arrives just in time. Following a scuffle between the two, Alberto is thrown off the cliff by Andrea and falls to his death.

== Cast ==
- Florinda Bolkan as Maciara
- Barbara Bouchet as Patrizia
- Tomas Milian as Andrea Martelli
- Irene Papas as Aurelia Avallone
- Marc Porel as Don Alberto Avallone
- Georges Wilson as "Uncle" Francesco
- Antonello Campodifiori as Lieutenant Delli Colli
- Ugo D'Alessio as Captain Modesti
- Virgilio Gazzolo as Magistrate
- Vito Passeri as Giuseppe Barra
- Rosalia Maggio as Mrs. Spriano, Michele's mother
- Andrea Aureli as Mr. Lo Cascio, Bruno's father
- Linda Sini as Mrs. Lo Cascio, Bruno's mother
- Franco Balducci as Mr. Spriano, Michele's father

Uncredited

- Fausta Avelli as Malvina Avallone
- Marcello Tamborra as Michele Spriano
- Duilio Cruciani as Mario
- Gianfranco Barra as Officer Impallomeni
- John Bartha and Empedocle Buzzanca as Carabinieri

== Production ==
The original draft of the script was set in Turin, but Fulci decided to set it in Basilicata for a more unique setting. Fernando Rey and Massimo Ranieri were originally cast as Francesco and Don Alberto.

Filming took place in locations around Basilicata, Apulia, and Abruzzo. The only purpose-built set in the film was the Carabinieri station.

During filming of the climactic fight scene, Tomas Milian and Marc Porel broke down into an actual fistfight, footage of which appears in the final film.

The special effects for Don Alberto's death sequence were created by an uncredited Carlo Rambaldi.

== Release ==
Don't Torture a Duckling was released theatrically by Medusa Distribuzione in Rome on 29 September 1972. It initially received a limited release in Europe due to the film's themes, among which was criticism of the Roman Catholic Church. It was released in France as La longue nuit de l'exorcisme (The Long Night of Exorcism). Though an English-language audio track was created for the film in 1972, it was never theatrically released in the United States and remained unreleased until 1999, when Anchor Bay Entertainment released the film on DVD and VHS. Adrian Luther Smith's reference work lists the translation of the original Italian title as Don't Torture Donald Duck, since in Italy, the cartoon character is referred to as Paperino.

=== Home media ===
The film was made available for the first time ever in the United States by Anchor Bay as part of the "Lucio Fulci Collection", uncut and remastered, containing its original aspect ratio of 2.35:1 for the DVD release. American distribution company Blue Underground released the same version of the film on DVD on 27 February 2007.

In the United Kingdom, Shameless Screen Entertainment made the film available on DVD on 29 August 2011 in a "Shameless Fan Edition", which contains, for the first time, optional English and Italian audio and subtitles, the Italian theatrical trailer and a booklet adapted by Stephen Thrower from Beyond Terror, his definitive book.

Arrow Video released the 4K UHD edition on March 25, 2025.

== Reception ==
Bloody Disgusting awarded the film a score of 4.5 out of 5, praising the film's cinematography, music, and gory special effects, and calling it one of their all-time favorite films by director Fulci. AllMovie gave the film a positive review, calling it "one of Fulci's more successful outings". TV Guide awarded the film 3 out of 5 stars, complimenting the film's direction, atmosphere, and well-executed murder scenes, stating, "Lucio Fulci's murder mystery paints an exceptionally unflattering portrait of small-town Sicily as a backwater rife with perversion, ignorance, madness and murderous small-mindedness."

According to Danny Shipka, the small Italian town of the setting turns out to be an Italian version of "Harper Valley PTA", with suspects including voyeurs, drug-addicted pedophiles, gypsies and priests. He finds that the film provides a thought-provoking depiction of life and politics in a small town of Italy. The main themes are "repression, sin and guilt". The motive of the murder turns out to be a desire to rescue the boys from the effects of their own sexuality. In other words, the killer attempts to preserve the innocence of the victims. He is attempting to send them to Heaven while they remained in a stage of uncorrupted grace.

Shipka finds that the film also demonstrates the tendency of giallo filmmakers to seriously question religion and priesthood. Mikel J. Koven points out that predatory priests also appeared in Who Saw Her Die? (1972) and The Bloodstained Shadow (1978).

Troy Howarth, author of So Deadly, So Perverse: 50 Years of Italian Giallo Films, calls it one of the most beautifully photographed Italian genre films in his commentary track for Arrow Video's 2017 Blu-ray release of the film.

In a 1994 interview, Lucio Fulci referred to this as his best film.
