= Lovers of Toledo =

- Directed by: Henri Decoin; Fernando Palacios
- Written by: Stendhal (story); François Chalais; Rupert Croft-Cooke; Maurice Griffe; Claude Vermorel; Natividad Zaro; Henri Decoin
- Produced by: Raymond Eger
- Starring: Alida Valli; Pedro Armendáriz; Françoise Arnoul; Gérard Landry
- Cinematography: Michel Kelber; Eloy Mella
- Edited by: Antonio Martínez; Denise Reiss
- Music by: Jesús García Leoz; Jean-Jacques Grünenwald
- Production companies: Lux Film; Films EGE; Atenea Films
- Distributed by: Lux Film (Italy)
- Release date: 28 January 1953
- Running time: 82 minutes
- Countries: France; Italy; Spain
- Language: French

Lovers of Toledo (French: Les amants de Tolède) is a 1953 historical film directed by Henri Decoin and Fernando Palacios and starring Alida Valli, Pedro Armendáriz and Françoise Arnoul. It was a co-production between France, Italy and Spain.

== Partial cast ==
- Alida Valli as Doña Inés de Arévalo Blas
- Pedro Armendáriz as Don Alvaro Blas Basto y Mosquera
- Françoise Arnoul as Sancha
- Gérard Landry as Fernando de la Cierva
- Marisa de Leza as Isabella
- José Sepulveda as Ricardo
- Rafael Bardem as Don Jaime de Arévalo
- Ricardo Calvo as Don José
- José Isbert as Anticuario
- Manuel Requena as Mesonero
- Manuel Aguilera as Oficial
- Beni Deus as Marcos
- María Francés as Mujer del pueblo
- Manrique Gil as Relator
- Casimiro Hurtado as Carpintero
- Manuel Kayser as Padre confesor
- José María Lado as Verdugo
- Nati Mistral as Gitana
- Santiago Rivero as Policía

== Bibliography ==
- Rège, Philippe. Encyclopedia of French Film Directors, Volume 1. Scarecrow Press, 2009.
