= Love, Madame =

1952 French film by Gilles Grangier

- Directed by: Gilles Grangier
- Written by: Françoise Giroud
- Based on: Vingt Ans Madame by Félix Gandéra
- Produced by: Antoine de Rouvre; Lucien Masson; Raoul Ploquin
- Starring: Arletty; François Périer; Marie Daëms
- Cinematography: Jean Isnard
- Edited by: Madeleine Gug
- Music by: Georges Van Parys
- Production companies: La Société des Films Sirius; Les Films Raoul Ploquin
- Distributed by: La Société des Films Sirius
- Release date: 23 January 1952
- Running time: 90 minutes
- Country: France
- Language: French
- Box office: 1,595,959 admissions (France)

Love, Madame (French: L'Amour, Madame) is a 1952 French comedy drama film directed by Gilles Grangier and starring Arletty, François Périer and Marie Daëms. It was shot at the Boulogne Studios in Paris and on location on the Côte d'Azur. The film's sets were designed by the art director Robert Clavel.

== Plot ==
Madame Célerier is determined to marry off her son François to a rich and haughty woman but François has other plans. During a train journey south he encounters the film star Arletty who is travelling to the Venice Film Festival. On his arrival his mother claims that he has become the lover of Arletty to the family of Diane who François truly loves.

== Cast ==
- Arletty as Herself
- François Périer as François Célerier
- Marie Daëms as Diane Broussard
- Clément Thierry as Alain Broussard
- Nadine Basile as Michèle Broussard
- Marcelle Hainia as Mrs Broussard
- Jacqueline Noëlle as actress
- Michel Boulau as young man
- Daniel Cauchy as young man
- Constance Thierry as young woman
- Carmen de Lara as young woman
- Jeanne Fusier-Gir as Berthe
- Robert Burnier as Mr Broussard
- Mireille Perrey as Mrs Célerier
- Jean Marais as Himself
- Josette Day as Herself
