= Scènes de ménage =

- Directed by: André Berthomieu
- Written by: Marcel Achard; André Berthomieu; Georges Courteline (play)
- Produced by: Louis Wipf
- Starring: Bernard Blier; Louis de Funès; Marthe Mercadier
- Cinematography: Armand Thirard
- Edited by: Boris Lewin
- Music by: Georges Van Parys
- Production company: Franco-London Films
- Distributed by: Gaumont Distribution
- Release date: 10 October 1954 (France)
- Running time: 90 minutes
- Country: France
- Language: French

Scènes de ménage English: Domestic stages, is a French comedy film from 1954, directed by André Berthomieu, written by Marcel Achard, starring Bernard Blier and Louis de Funès. The scenario is based on three pieces by playwright Georges Courteline: "La peur des coups", "La paix chez soi", and "Les Boulingrin".

== Plot ==
Three old friends meet again. They compare their marriages and tell each other stories which illustrate why they complain about their wives.

== Cast ==
- Bernard Blier as husband of Aglaé
- Louis de Funès as Monsieur Boulingrin, Ernestine's husband
- Sophie Desmarets as Aglaé
- Marie Daems as Valentine Trielle
- François Périer as the journalist Mr Trielle
- Marthe Mercadier as Ernestine Boulingrin
- Jean Richard as Monsieur des Rillettes
- Lily Bontemps as singer
- Solange Certain as the soubrette
- Michèle Philippe as Mathilde
- Paul Toscano and his orchestra
