= The Lost Girl (film) =

1954 film

- Directed by: Jean Gourguet
- Written by: Jean Gourguet; Michelle Gourguet
- Produced by: Jean Gourguet
- Starring: Claudine Dupuis; Gérard Landry; Robert Berri.
- Cinematography: Scarciafico Hugo
- Edited by: Daniel Lander
- Music by: René Denoncin
- Production company: Société Française de Production
- Distributed by: Héraut Film
- Release date: 29 January 1954
- Running time: 85 minutes
- Country: France
- Language: French

The Lost Girl (French: La fille perdue) is a 1954 French drama film directed by Jean Gourguet and starring Claudine Dupuis, Gérard Landry and Robert Berri. It combines elements of melodrama and film noir. Location shooting took place around Noirmoutier-en-l'Île and Nantes.

== Synopsis ==
A sixteen year old village girl Marguerite becomes pregnant by a tourist. She heads to find work in Nantes to support her child, but life is hard and she ends up working in a rough bar for sailors for many years. It is there she falls under the influence of Pierre, who involves her with a gang of smugglers. It is with the assistance of her childhood friend Jean-Marie that Marguerite eventually recovers.

== Cast ==
- Claudine Dupuis as Marguerite Le Goff/Rita
- Gérard Landry as Jean-Marie Kermadec
- Robert Berri as Pierre Labry
- Dora Doll as Suzy
- Zizi Saint-Clair as Guitou
- Gisèle Grandpré as Christiane Devillers
- André Roanne as Dr. Devillers
- Jean Clarieux as Loulou
- Héléna Manson
- Mireille Ozy
- Michel Lesage

== Bibliography ==
- Berthomé, Jean-Pierre & Naizet, Gaël. Bretagne et cinéma: cent ans de création cinématographique en Bretagne. Cinémathèque de Bretagne, 1995.
- Rège, Philippe. Encyclopedia of French Film Directors, Volume 1. Scarecrow Press, 2009.
