= The Lovers of Midnight =

1953 film

- Directed by: Roger Richebé
- Written by: Jacques Sigurd; Georges Neveux
- Produced by: Roger Richebé
- Starring: Dany Robin; Jean Marais; Louis Seigner
- Cinematography: Michel Kelber
- Edited by: Yvonne Martin
- Music by: Henri Verdun; José Padilla
- Production company: Films Roger Richebé
- Distributed by: Films Roger Richebé
- Release date: 1 April 1953
- Running time: 99 minutes
- Country: France
- Language: French
- Box office: 1,438,639 admissions (France)

Lovers of Midnight (French: Les Amants de minuit) is a 1953 French drama film directed by Roger Richebé and starring Dany Robin, Jean Marais and Louis Seigner. In other countries the film was known under titles including Lovers of Midnight (English), De älskande vid midnatt (Sweden), and Keskiyön rakastavaiset (Finland). The film's sets were designed by Robert Dumesnil.

== Main cast ==
- Jean Marais as Marcel Dulac
- Dany Robin as Françoise Letanneur
- Louis Seigner as M. Paul
- Micheline Gary as Monique
- Frédérique Nadar as Irène
- Gisèle Grandpré as Mme. Paul
- Sylvie Rameau as La femme de l'avocat
- Jacques Eyser as L'avocat
- Nicole Rozan as La clente rêveche
- Cécilia Bert as M. Torquato
