= Once Is Enough =

1946 film

- Directed by: Andrée Feix
- Written by: Marc-Gilbert Sauvajon; Solange Térac
- Starring: Edwige Feuillère; Fernand Gravey; Henri Guisol
- Cinematography: Christian Matras
- Edited by: Paula Neurisse
- Music by: Jean Wiener
- Production companies: Productions Sigma; Gaumont
- Distributed by: Les Films Vog
- Release date: 23 October 1946
- Running time: 100 minutes
- Country: France
- Language: French

Once Is Enough (French: Il suffit d'une fois) is a 1946 French comedy film directed by Andrée Feix and starring Edwige Feuillère, Fernand Gravey and Henri Guisol.

== Cast ==
- Edwige Feuillère as Christine Jourdan
- Fernand Gravey as Jacques Reval
- Henri Guisol as Bernard Ancelin
- François Joux
- Made Siamé
- Hélène Garaud
- Henri Charrett
- Ky Duyen

== Bibliography ==
- Brigitte Rollet. Coline Serreau. Manchester University Press, 1998.
