= François Joux =

French actor

- Born: 11 July 1912; Levallois-Perret, France
- Occupation: Actor
- Years active: 1941–1961 (film)

François Joux (born 11 July 1912, date of death unknown) was a French stage and film actor.

== Selected filmography ==
- The Pavilion Burns (1941)
- The Duchess of Langeais (1942)
- The Trump Card (1942)
- Paris Frills (1945)
- The Murderer is Not Guilty (1946)
- Women's Games (1946)
- Once is Enough (1946)
- The Battle of the Rails (1946)
- Not Guilty (1947)
- Antoine and Antoinette (1947)
- Six Hours to Lose (1947)
- Danger of Death (1947)
- Barry (1949)
- Manon (1949)
- The King (1949)
- The Cupid Club (1949)
- Women Are Crazy (1950)
- Amédée (1950)
- Just Me (1950)
- A Hole in the Wall (1950)
- Alone in Paris (1951)
- Rue des Saussaies (1951)
- The Respectful Prostitute (1952)
- Follow That Man (1953)
- The Lovers of Marianne (1953)
- A Woman's Treasure (1953)
- Alarm in Morocco (1953)
- Endless Horizons (1953)
- Julietta (1953)
- Virgile (1953)
- Faites-moi confiance (1954)
- Adam Is Eve (1954)
- French Cancan (1955)
- Three Days to Live (1957)
- Montparnasse 19 (1958)
- Lift to the Scaffold (1958)

== Bibliography ==
- Ann C. Paietta. Saints, Clergy and Other Religious Figures on Film and Television, 1895-2003. McFarland, 2005.
