= Dirty Dreamer =

1978 film

- Directed by: Jean-Marie Périer
- Written by: Jean-Marie Périer; Lucien Elia; Pascal Jardin
- Produced by: Danièle Delorme; Yves Robert
- Starring: Jacques Dutronc
- Cinematography: Yves Lafaye
- Edited by: Nicole Saunier
- Music by: Jacques Dutronc
- Production companies: La Guéville; FR3
- Distributed by: Gaumont Distribution
- Release date: April 5, 1978
- Running time: 85 minutes
- Language: French
- Box office: $3.9 million

Dirty Dreamer (French: Sale Rêveur) is a French drama film directed by Jean-Marie Périer.

The film was a nominee for the 1979 César Award for Best Production Design for Théobald Meurisse. It did not win.

== Plot ==
A young man, who lives in a vacant lot with a band of misfits, invents a love story with an elegant young woman.

== Cast ==
- Jacques Dutronc : Jérôme
- Lea Massari : Joséphe
- Jean Bouise : Robert
- Maurice Bénichou : Taupin
- Marthe Villalonga : Madame Taupin
- Anémone : Colette
- Dominique Bernard : Monsieur Taupin
- Greg Germain : César
- Nathalie Périer : Anne
- Magali Clément : The Standardist
- Caroline Loeb : The Waiter

== Accolades ==
Year	Award	Category	Recipient	Result
1979	César Awards	César Award for Best Production Design	Théobald Meurisse	Nominated
