= Marc-Gilbert Sauvajon =

French film director, script-writer, playwright and author

Marc-Gilbert Sauvajon (25 September 1909, Valence, Drôme – 15 April 1985, Montpellier) was a French film director, script-writer, playwright and author.

After studying law, he was made chief editor of the daily newspaper Sud-Est. He founded the journal Valence-Républicain.

His play "All in the Family", adapted by Victor Wolfson, was given its first performance at the Strand Theatre, London on 17 June 1959. It was directed by Norman Marshall and designed by Paul Mayo. The cast consisted of Maxine Audley, Donald Sinden, Andre Morell, Brian Oulton, Peggy Thorpe-Bates, Michael Logan, Vanda Godsell, Pauline Knight, Virginia Maskell, Mary Powell, Douglas Malcom and Philip Ashley.

== Plays ==
- 1939 : L'Amant de paille
- 1945 : Au petit bonheur
- 1951 : Tapage nocturne (All in the Family)
- 1953 : Treize à table
- 1953 : Adorable Julia, based on Guy Bolton's play Theatre (1941), based on the novel Theatre (1937) by W. Somerset Maugham
- 1979 : Je veux voir Mioussov by Marc-Gilbert Sauvajon and Valentin Kataev, produced by Jacques Fabbri, at the Théâtre du Palais-Royal and the Théâtre des Variétés in 1980

== Selected filmography ==
- Happy Go Lucky, directed by Marcel L'Herbier (France, 1946, based on the play Au petit bonheur)
- The Straw Lover, directed by Gilles Grangier (France, 1951, based on the play L'Amant de paille)
- Tapage nocturne, directed by Marc-Gilbert Sauvajon (France, 1951, based on the play Tapage nocturne)
- Thirteen at the Table, directed by André Hunebelle (France, 1955, based on the play Treize à table)
- Adorable Julia, directed by Alfred Weidenmann (West Germany, 1962, based on the play Adorable Julia)

=== Screenwriter ===
- Vautrin, directed by Pierre Billon (1943)
- Goodbye Darling, directed by Raymond Bernard (1946)
- The Sea Rose, directed by Jacques de Baroncelli (1946)
- Once is Enough, directed by Andrée Feix (1946)
- Third at Heart, directed by Jacques de Casembroot (1947)
- Sybille's Night, directed by Jean-Paul Paulin (1947)
- The Great Maguet, directed by Roger Richebé (1947)
- Impeccable Henri, directed by Charles-Félix Tavano (1948)
- Woman Without a Past, directed by Gilles Grangier (1948)
- My Seal and Them, directed by Pierre Billon (1951)
- My Friend Oscar, directed by Åke Ohberg (1951)
- The Little Cardinals, directed by Gilles Grangier (1951)
- The Prettiest Sin in the World, directed by Gilles Grangier (1951)
- The Case Against X, directed by Richard Pottier (1952)
- Imperial Violets, directed by Richard Pottier (1952)
- A Woman's Treasure, directed by Jean Stelli (1953)
- Michel Strogoff, directed by Carmine Gallone (1956)
- Women Are Like That, directed by Bernard Borderie (1960)
- The Triumph of Michael Strogoff, directed by Viktor Tourjansky (1961)
- Shéhérazade, directed by Pierre Gaspard-Huit (1963)
- Your Turn, Darling, directed by Bernard Borderie (1963)
- Duck in Orange Sauce, directed by Luciano Salce (1975)

=== Director ===
- The Cupid Club (1949)
- The King (1949)
- My Friend Sainfoin (1950)
- Just Me (1950)
- Tapage nocturne (1951)
