= Un peu de soleil dans l'eau froide =

1971 film

- Directed by: Jacques Deray
- Written by: Jacques Deray; Jean-Claude Carrière
- Produced by: Gérard Beytout; René Pignières
- Starring: Claudine Auger; Marc Porel; Judith Magre; Nadine Alari; André Falcon; Barbara Bach; Bernard Fresson
- Cinematography: Jean Badal
- Edited by: Henri Lanoë
- Music by: Michel Legrand
- Distributed by: SNC
- Release date: October 29, 1971
- Running time: 110 minutes
- Country: France
- Language: French

Un peu de soleil dans l'eau froide, internationally released as A Few Hours of Sunlight and A Little Sun in Cold Water, is a 1971 French film directed Jacques Deray adapted from the novel of Françoise Sagan. The title quotes the poet Paul Éluard.

== Synopsis ==
In Limoges, Nathalie Silvener, a married woman falls for Gilles, a depressed and brilliant Parisian journalist, himself in a relationship with a model.

== Cast ==
- Claudine Auger : Nathalie Silvener
- Marc Porel : Gilles Lantier
- Judith Magre : Odile
- Nadine Alari : Gilda
- André Falcon : Florent
- Barbara Bach : Héloïse / Elvire
- Bernard Fresson : Jean
- Jean-Claude Carrière : François
- Gérard Depardieu : Pierre
- Marc Eyraud : Monsieur Rouargue
- Jacques Debary : Fairmont
- Guido Mannari : Thomas
- Mireille Perrey

== Reception ==
According to Cahiers du cinéma, the film is one of the most personal works of Deray. Le Nouvel Observateur referred to it as "a minor film, outdated much like Sagan's minor novel". Time Out was very critical, calling it "fatuous" and saying "Porel gives one of the most boring, suburban, asexual performances imaginable". DVD Talk called it "dated and dull".

== The novel ==
It is based on a 1969 book by Françoise Sagan. BSCNews calls it "a superb novel", praising Sagan's "simple and poetic" style.
