= Marie Daëms =

French actress (1928–2016)

- Born: 27 January 1928; Paris, France
- Died: 19 January 2016 (aged 87); Vigneux-sur-Seine, France
- Occupation: Actress
- Years active: 1949–1999 (film)
- Spouse: François Périer (1949-1959)

Marie Daëms (January 27, 1928 – January 19, 2016) was a French stage, film and television actress. After studying at the Lycée Jules-Ferry in Paris, Daëms made her stage debut in 1947 and her first screen appearance in 1949. She was married to the actor François Périer from 1949 to 1959.

== Selected filmography ==
- A Change in the Wind (1949)
- Le sorcier du ciel (1949)
- The Little Zouave (1950)
- My Seal and Them (1951)
- Love, Madame (1952)
- A Woman's Treasure (1953)
- The Air of Paris (1954)
- Scènes de ménage (1954)
- Maid in Paris (1956)
- Irresistible Catherine (1957)
- Let's Be Daring, Madame (1957)
- Filous et compagnie (1957)
- Charming Boys (1957)
- Life Together (1958)
- The Journey (1959)
- We Will Go to Deauville (1962)
- Que personne ne sorte (1964)
- Alibis (1977)
- The Black Sheep (1979)
- Deux enfoirés à Saint-Tropez (1986)
- Every Other Weekend (1990)
- Those Who Love Me Can Take the Train (1998)

== Bibliography ==
- Hayward, Susan & Vincendeau, Ginette . French Film: Texts and Contexts. Psychology Press, 2000.
- Petrucci, Antonio. Twenty Years of Cinema in Venice. International Exhibition of Cinematographic Art, 1952.
