= Act of Love (1953 film) =

1953 film

- Directed by: Anatole Litvak
- Written by: Joseph Kessel; Irwin Shaw
- Based on: The Girl on the Via Flaminia; 1949 novel by Alfred Hayes
- Produced by: Anatole Litvak
- Starring: Kirk Douglas; Dany Robin
- Cinematography: Armand Thirard
- Edited by: Léonide Azar (French); William Hornbeck
- Music by: Michel Emer; Joe Hajos; Michel B. Rosenstein
- Production company: Benagoss Productions
- Distributed by: United Artists
- Release dates: December 17, 1953 (United States); May 7, 1954 (France)
- Running time: 95 minutes (French); 108 minutes (English)
- Countries: France; United States
- Languages: English; French
- Box office: 1,048,123 admissions (France) $1.1 million

Act of Love (French title: Un acte d'amour) is a 1953 American romantic drama film directed by Anatole Litvak, starring Kirk Douglas and Dany Robin. It is based on the 1949 novel The Girl on the Via Flaminia by Alfred Hayes. A Parisian falls in love with an American soldier near the end of World War II.

== Plot ==
Robert Teller visits a seaport in the south of France in the early 1950s. He reflects back to his time in the army shortly after Paris has been liberated.

Years earlier, to get away from the barracks and the other soldiers, Robert rents a room in a hotel-restaurant. Lise Guidayec, an orphan without money or identity papers, seeks a way to escape from the authorities. She asks Robert to pass her off as his wife. Even though he does not inspire trust, she starts to fall in love with him. Lise tells of the time she was the most happy and secure—living in a little seaside village.

When a black market dragnet lands Lise in jail, she is humiliated because now she (like Jean Valjean) is branded a "criminal for life". By this time, Robert loves her deeply and is willing to marry her. In order to do so, Robert must obtain the approval of his commanding officer, who refuses because the captain thinks he knows what is best for his men. Robert is transferred away from Paris immediately. He deserts, but is arrested, causing him to miss his wedding to Lise.

His thoughts returning to the present, Robert runs into his old captain (who had been trying to place Robert's face). He hears the captain tell his wife what a troublemaker Robert was back then and how he "rescued" Robert from the clutches of a French girl. Robert then reveals that Lise committed suicide by drowning in the river shortly after he was transferred.

== Cast ==
- Kirk Douglas as Robert Teller
- Dany Robin as Lise Gudayec / Madame Teller
- Gabrielle Dorziat as Adèle Lacaud
- Barbara Laage as Nina
- Fernand Ledoux as Fernand Lacaud
- Robert Strauss as S/Sgt. Johnny Blackwood
- Marthe Mercadier as La fille de la terrasse / Young woman
- George Mathews as Captain Henderson
- Richard Benedict as Pete (GI who is rolled for his money)
- Leslie Dwyer as Le sergent anglais / English sergeant
- Sydney Chaplin as Un soldat / Soldier
- Brigitte Bardot as Mimi
- Nedd Willard
- Serge Reggiani as Claude Lacaud

== Production ==
The film was one of several English-language movies Brigitte Bardot made before becoming internationally famous.

== Reception ==
Variety called it "a class job".
