= Anemia (film) =

- Directed by: Alberto Abruzzese; Achille Pisanti
- Screenplay by: Alberto Abruzzese; Achille Pisanti
- Based on: Anemia. Storia di un vampiro communista by Alberto Abruzzese
- Starring: Hanns Zischler; Gioia Scola; Gérard Landry; Linda Sini; Julian Jenkins
- Cinematography: Angelo Sciarra
- Edited by: Mirella Mencio
- Music by: Lorenzo Ferrero
- Production companies: Rai Tre; RAI Radiotelevisione Italiana
- Release date: 9 September 1986 (Venice Film Festival)
- Running time: 90 minutes
- Country: Italy

Anemia is a 1986 Italian film directed and written by Alberto Abruzzese and Achille Pisanti based on Abruzzese's novelette Anemia. Storia di un vampiro communista. The film was shown at the Venice Film Festival in 1986.

== Production ==
Prior to any development on the film, Alberto Abruzzese taught at the University of Naples and published several books since 1972 was referred to by historian and critic Roberto Curti as one of Italy's "most highly reputed sociologists and semiologists". Abruzzese's novel titled Anemia. Storia di un vampiro communista was published in Italy in December 1984. The novelette's publisher, Theoria, was attempting to publish novels in the Fantastique genre, and had several writers including Abuzzese contribute stories. Abruzzese began working on a film adaptation of the novel in late December 1985. The film was directed by Abruzzese and Achille Pisanti who also helped Abruzzese adapt material to a screenplay.

Anemia was shot in Rome and off the Amalfi Coast. The film included references to Gothic fiction including Nosferatu and The Castle of Otranto. Abruzzese considered the film a "hypersensible journey among the literary and cinematic genres a game of displacements".

== Release and reception ==
Anemia was shown at the Venice Film Festival on September 9, 1986. Curti stated the film received "generally perplexed, if not downright bad reviews". Piero Zanotto of La Stampa stated that the film's narrative was a series of "linear encounters with oneirism, eroticism, horror, sentimentalism, period-evoking flash backs all tied together by an extremely thin but logical thread of the events lived by the protagonists" and concluded that: "As for the pleasantness of the result for the viewers... we have strong doubts".

The film has not received theatrical distribution and was first shown on Rai Tre television in Italy on October 27, 1990.
