= My Friend Sainfoin =

1950 film

Mon ami Sainfoin
- Directed by: Marc-Gilbert Sauvajon
- Written by: Paul-Adrien Schaye (novel); Roger Vercel
- Starring: Pierre Blanchar
- Release date: 10 May 1950
- Running time: 85 minutes
- Country: France
- Language: French

My Friend Sainfoin (French: Mon ami Sainfoin) is a French comedy film from 1950, directed by Marc-Gilbert Sauvajon, based on a novel by Paul-Adrien Schaye, and starring Pierre Blanchar. The film features Louis de Funès as guide.

== Cast ==
- Pierre Blanchar: Sainfoin, friend and shopper
- Sophie Desmarets: Eugénie de Puycharmois, Guillaume's wife
- Jacqueline Porel: Yolande, the driver
- Denise Grey: Eugénie's mother
- Alfred Adam: Guillaume de Puycharmois, Eugénie's husband
- Jean Hebey: the cabaret artist
- Henry Charrett: father Machin
- Louis de Funès: guide
- Eugène Frouhins: the peasant
- Albert Michel: the boy
- Nicolas Amato: the doctor
