= Captain Blomet =

1947 film

- Directed by: Andrée Feix
- Starring: Fernand Gravey; Gaby Sylvia; Jean Meyer
- Release date: 19 September 1947
- Running time: 95 minutes
- Country: France
- Language: French

Captain Blomet (French: Capitaine Blomet) is a 1947 French comedy film directed by Andrée Feix and starring Fernand Gravey, Gaby Sylvia and Jean Meyer. The film's sets were designed by the art director Jacques Krauss.

== Cast ==
- Fernand Gravey as Blomet
- Gaby Sylvia as Micheline de Mandane
- Jean Meyer as Justin
- Henri Crémieux as Le premier témoin de Cugnac
- Made Siamé as Mme de Guérinière
- Jacques Tarride
- Denise Precheur
- Ariane Murator
- Etienne Decroux
- Pierre Vernet
- Colette Fleuriot
- Suzanne Flon
- Jean Gold
- Jacques Henley
- Katherine Kath
- Jacques Erwin as M. de Cugnac
- Jean-Roger Caussimon as Clodomir
- Jacques Castelot as Rodolphe
- Jean d'Yd
- Zita Fiore
- Frédérique Nadar
- Marcelle Praince

== Bibliography ==
- Palmer Tim & Michael, Charlie. Directory of World Cinema: France. Intellect Books, 2013.
