= Paris Frills =

1945 film

- Directed by: Jacques Becker
- Written by: Jacques Becker; Maurice Aubergé; Maurice Griffe
- Produced by: André Halley des Fontaines
- Starring: Raymond Rouleau; Micheline Presle; Jean Chevrier; Gabrielle Dorziat; Jeanne Fusier-Gir
- Cinematography: Nicolas Hayer
- Edited by: Marguerite Renoir
- Music by: Jean-Jacques Grünenwald
- Production company: L'Essor Cinématographique Françias
- Distributed by: Védis
- Release date: 20 June 1945
- Running time: 110 minutes
- Country: France
- Language: French
- Box office: 2,108,663 admissions (France)

Paris Frills (French: Falbalas) is a 1945 French drama film directed by Jacques Becker and starring Raymond Rouleau, Micheline Presle and Jean Chevrier. It was made in 1944 during the German occupation but not released until the following year. The film's sets were designed by the art director Max Douy. It was shot at the Francoeur Studios in Paris. Exteriors were shot in the 16th arrondissement of Paris.

== Plot ==
Micheline (Micheline Presle), a young woman from the provinces, arrives in Paris to prepare for her marriage to a silk manufacturer from Lyon, Daniel Rousseau (Jean Chevrier). But she falls in love with the best friend of her husband-to-be, the fashion designer Philippe Clarence (Raymond Rouleau). He is an impenitent Don Juan who seduces her when he feels the need for some creative inspiration and then drops her just as quickly when he comes to devote himself to a new collection. Micheline no longer feels she can go ahead and get married. A few weeks later Clarence tries to reconquer her but it is too late. She refuses. Clarence goes mad and throws himself from a window.

== Main cast ==
- Raymond Rouleau as Philippe Clarence
- Micheline Presle as Micheline Lafaurie
- Jean Chevrier as Daniel Rousseau
- Gabrielle Dorziat as Solange
- Jeanne Fusier-Gir as Paulette
- Françoise Lugagne as Anne-Marie
- Christiane Barry as Lucienne
- Rosine Luguet as Cousin
- Yolande Bloin
- Eveline Volney as Employee
- Maria Carld
- François Joux as Murier
- Georges Roullet
- Marc Doelnitz as Cousin

== Critical appraisal ==
Film critic Manny Farber in The New Republic, December 16, 1946, wrote:

This is the only movie I have ever seen in which a posturing, narcissistic personality is shown in the full run of everyday situations and is handled with a matter-of-fact understanding that makes it into a sad, creative, extremely curious and complicated character.

Farber adds: “With the efficiency of a good documentary but in a charming, casual, offhand manner, Becker acquaints you with the complicated, caste-ridden business of dress designing…the nicest group of people I have seen in current movies are the friendly, loyal, unaffected seamstresses whose characters are so different from the dresses they make.”

== Influence ==
Jean-Paul Gaultier told the New Yorker that seeing Falbalas made him want to go into fashion. The story, about a Parisian dressmaker who seduces his best friend's fiancée, provided a detailed look at the fashion industry of the time, and shaped Gaultier's ideas of what that world would be like.

== Sources ==
- Farber, Manny. 2009. Farber on Film: The Complete Film Writings of Manny Farber. Edited by Robert Polito. Library of America. ISBN 978-1-59853-050-6
