= Monelle =

1948 film directed by Henri Decoin

- Directed by: Henri Decoin
- Written by: Henri Jeanson
- Produced by: Jacques Roitfeld
- Starring: Louis Jouvet; Renée Devillers; Dany Robin
- Cinematography: Armand Thirard
- Edited by: Annick
- Music by: Henri Sauguet
- Production company: Compagnie Industrielle et Commerciale Cinématographique
- Distributed by: Francinex
- Release date: 15 September 1948
- Running time: 105 minutes
- Country: France
- Language: French

Monelle (French: Les amoureux sont seuls au monde) is a 1948 French drama film directed by Henri Decoin and starring Louis Jouvet, Renée Devillers and Dany Robin. It was shot at the Billancourt Studios in Paris and on location in the city. The film's sets were designed by the art director Emile Alex

== Synopsis ==
Gérard Favier is a celebrated composer who is in love with his wife Sylvia. He takes on a young piano protégé Monelle and helps propel her to success, but newspaper reports suggests that they are having an affair.

== Cast ==
- Louis Jouvet as Gérard Favier
- Renée Devillers as Sylvia Favier
- Dany Robin as Monelle Picart
- Philippe Nicaud as Jules
- Janine Viénot
- Brigitte Auber as Christine
- Maurice Lagrenée as Le directeur du journal
- Émile Drain as Un critique
- Jean Le Fort
- Lucien Carol as Le patron du bistrot
- Charles Vissières as Le beau-père
- Philippe Lemaire as Claude, l'amoureux
- Jean Heuzé as Un critique
- Jacques Provins
- Pierre Ringel as Le marchand de porte-bonheur
- Léo Lapara as Ludo
- Fernand René as Michel Picart
- Nicole Courcel
- Robert Le Fort as Le garçon d'honneur
- Albert Michel as Le chef de bureau
- Geneviève Morel as La bonne des Picart

== Bibliography ==
- Bazin, André . Bazin on Global Cinema, 1948-1958. University of Texas Press, 2014.
