= The Call of Destiny (1953 film) =

- Directed by: Georges Lacombe
- Written by: Jacques Viot
- Produced by: Michel Lesay; Léonce Relu
- Starring: Jean Marais; Jacqueline Porel; Édouard Delmont
- Cinematography: Robert Lefebvre
- Edited by: Henri Taverna; Jacqueline Thiédot
- Music by: Louis Beydts
- Production company: Miramar Productions
- Distributed by: Ciné Sélections
- Release date: 15 February 1953
- Running time: 100 minutes
- Country: France
- Language: French
- Box office: 1,832,739 admissions (France)

The Call of Destiny (French: L'Appel du destin) is a 1953 French comedy drama film directed by Georges Lacombe and starring Jean Marais, Jacqueline Porel and Édouard Delmont.

== Plot ==
While on tour, a conducting prodigy encounters his father for the first time. A formerly brilliant pianist he has declined into alcoholism and abandoned the family.

== Cast ==
- Jean Marais as Lorenzo Lombardi
- Jacqueline Porel as Lucienne Lombardi
- Roberto Benzi as Roberto Lombardi
- Édouard Delmont as M. Galibert
- Georgette Anys as La grosse Lolo
- Renée Devillers as Germaine Obrecht
- Charles Dechamps as Monsieur Roze
- Fernand Sardou as Dottore Aldo Guarneri
- Germaine Pape as Mme Torquato
- Fernand Rauzéna as M. Torquato
- Jean Lanier as Crespi, l'ami
- Marcel Lebas as Le facteur
- Philippe Richard as Le directeur
- Julien Verdier as Dupont, le musicien
- Léon Walther as Count Amadeo, le critique

== Bibliography ==
- Oscherwitz, Dayna & Higgins, MaryEllen. The A to Z of French Cinema. Scarecrow Press, 2009.
