= My Seal and Them =

1951 film

- Directed by: Pierre Billon
- Written by: Charles de Richter (novel); Pierre Billon; Marc-Gilbert Sauvajon
- Produced by: Jacques Bar; Raymond Froment
- Starring: Marie Daëms; François Périer; Jeanne Fusier-Gir
- Cinematography: Nikolai Toporkoff
- Edited by: Andrée Danis
- Music by: Jean Marion
- Production company: Terra Film
- Distributed by: DisCina
- Release date: 23 March 1951
- Running time: 95 minutes
- Country: France
- Language: French

My Seal and Them (French: Mon phoque et elles) is a 1951 French comedy film directed by Pierre Billon and starring Marie Daëms, François Périer and Jeanne Fusier-Gir. A separate Swedish-language version My Friend Oscar was also simultaneously produced with the same director. It was shot at the Photosonor Studios in Courbevoie on the outskirts of Paris. The film's sets were designed by the art director René Moulaert.

== Synopsis ==
A fast-living diplomat's uncomplicated life is thrown into disorder when he wins a seal in a raffle. His girlfriend Gabrielle leaves him, but he meets Diana, an Englishwoman who appreciates seals.

== Cast ==
- Marie Daëms as Gabrielle Rivers
- François Périer as François Verville
- Jeanne Fusier-Gir as Madame Pierrat
- Pierre Bertin as Monsieur de Saint-Brive
- Moira Lister as Diana
- Odette Barencey as La concierge
- Made Siamé as La poissonnière
- Jacques Dynam as Un livreur
- Hennery as Un livreur
- Raymond Rognoni as Le gérant
- Pierre Sergeol as Le patron du restaurant
- Campbell Cotts as Sir Archibald
- Michael Trubshawe as Sir Frederick
- René Alié as Un agent de police
- Gil Delamare as Un agent
- Marcel Melrac as L'employé à la gare
- Albert Michel as Le poissonnier
- Jean Kolb as Le locataire
- Georges-François Frontec as Un homme

== Bibliography ==
- Goble, Alan. The Complete Index to Literary Sources in Film. Walter de Gruyter, 1999.
