= Rooster Heart =

- Directed by: Maurice Cloche
- Written by: Jean-Pierre Feydeau; Raymond Vincy
- Produced by: Alain Poiré
- Starring: Fernandel; Gisèle Alcee; Jean Témerson
- Cinematography: Willy Faktorovitch
- Edited by: Renée Gary
- Music by: Roger Dumas
- Production company: Gaumont
- Distributed by: Gaumont
- Release date: 27 December 1946
- Running time: 75 minutes
- Country: France
- Language: French

Rooster Heart (French: Coeur de coq) is a 1946 French comedy film directed by Maurice Cloche and starring Fernandel, Gisèle Alcee and Jean Témerson. The film's sets were designed by Robert Giordani.

== Plot ==
A man is too shy to ask a girl out and decides to kill himself. While lying in the road he is rescued by a Doctor who tries to cure him by implanting the heart of a rooster into him, something which suddenly makes him irresistible to women.

== Cast ==
- Fernandel as Tulipe
- Gisèle Alcée as Loulou
- Jean Témerson as Stanislas Pugilaskoff
- Marcel Vallée as Tournesol
- Maximilienne as Mme Estelle
- Henri Arius as Lacorbiere
- Darcelys
- Marthe Marty
- Lorette Gallant
- Paul Azaïs as Serapain
- Rouzeaud
- Jacques Hélian
- Michel Roger
- Maria Aranda
- Mireille Perrey as Mme Bourride, dite :Vera
- Mag-Avril
- Cora Camoin
- Henri Doublier
- Liane Marlene
- Zappy Max as Un musicien de l'orchestre

== Bibliography ==
- Quinlan, David. Quinlan's Film Stars. Batsford, 2000.
