= Jean-Pierre Kérien =

French actor

- Born: 15 March 1912; France
- Died: 9 April 1984 (aged 72); Paris, France
- Occupation: Actor
- Years active: 1937-1979

Jean-Pierre Kérien (15 March 1912 – 9 April 1984) was a French film actor. He appeared in 40 films between 1937 and 1979.

== Filmography ==
Year	Title	Role	Notes
1937	L'Affaire du courrier de Lyon	Jean Bruer	
1938	The Tamer	Raphaël	
1939	The Porter from Maxim's	Octave	
1941	The Italian Straw Hat	Félix	
1942	Love Letters	Le postillon	
1943	A Dog's Life	Grégorius	
1948	Une mort sans importance	Gervais	
1949	Last Love	Paul	
1949	Les Eaux troubles	Goinart	
1950	La reSouriciè	Lebray	
1950	The Inn of Sin	Briquet	
1950	A Man Walks in the City	Jean Sauviot	
1950	Un sourire dans la tempête	Jean Langrand	
1950	Born of Unknown Father	Claude Nogent	
1951	The Case of Doctor Galloy	Le docteur Galloy	
1952	Domenica	Giuseppe Léandri	
1952	The Smugglers' Banquet	Pierre	
1953	Little Jacques	Noël Rambert	
1954	Zoé	Docteur Louis Delay	
1954	Crime at the Concert Mayol	Inspecteur Million	
1954	Operation Thunder	Pierre Dumans	
1955	Passion de femmes	Paul Montigny	
1956	Trapeze	Otto	
1956	In the Manner of Sherlock Holmes	Marval	
1956	La Plus Belle des vies	Jean Berthillot	
1957	Paris clandestin	Commissaire Bruno	
1958	Les Aventuriers du Mékong	Le Toubib	
1958	Tabarin	Larjac	
1960	Prisonniers de la brousse	Van Houcke	
1960	Le Septième Jour de Saint-Malo	Le maire de Saint-Malo	
1960	September Storm	LeClerc	
1961	Les bras de la nuit		
1963	Muriel	Alphonse Noyard	
1966	The War Is Over	Chardin	
