= Claire Mafféi =

French actress (1919–2004)

- Born: 11 October 1919; Lyon, France
- Died: 16 September 2004 (aged 84); Brignais, France
- Occupation: Actress
- Years active: 1941–1982 (film)

Claire Mafféi (11 October 1919 – 16 September 2004) was a French stage and film actress. She is best known for her role in the 1947 comedy-drama Antoine and Antoinette by Jacques Becker. She was married to the screenwriter Claude Vermorel.

== Selected filmography ==
- Women's Games (1946)
- Antoine and Antoinette (1947)
- The Most Beautiful Life (1956)

== Bibliography ==
- Danielle E. Hipkins & Gill Plain. War-torn Tales: Literature, Film and Gender in the Aftermath of World War II. Peter Lang, 2007.
