= Made Siamé =

French actress (1885–1974)

- Born: 28 April 1885; Paris, France
- Died: 16 June 1974 (aged 89); Paris, France
- Occupation: Actress
- Years active: 1932-1963 (film)

Made Siamé (1885–1974) was a French stage and film actress.

== Selected filmography ==
- Youth (1933)
- The House on the Dune (1934)
- The Mysteries of Paris (1935)
- The Secret of Polichinelle (1936)
- The Alibi (1937)
- The Benefactor (1942)
- Father Goriot (1945)
- Once is Enough (1946)
- Not So Stupid (1946)
- The Eternal Husband (1946)
- Captain Blomet (1947)
- Antoine and Antoinette (1947)
- Farewell Mister Grock (1950)
- Chéri (1950)
- Véronique (1950)
- The Beautiful Image (1951)
- My Friend Oscar (1951)
- Clara de Montargis (1951)
- My Seal and Them (1951)
- My Husband Is Marvelous (1952)
- Operation Magali (1953)

== Bibliography ==
- Goble, Alan. The Complete Index to Literary Sources in Film. Walter de Gruyter, 1999.
