= Renée Devillers =

French actress (1902–2000)

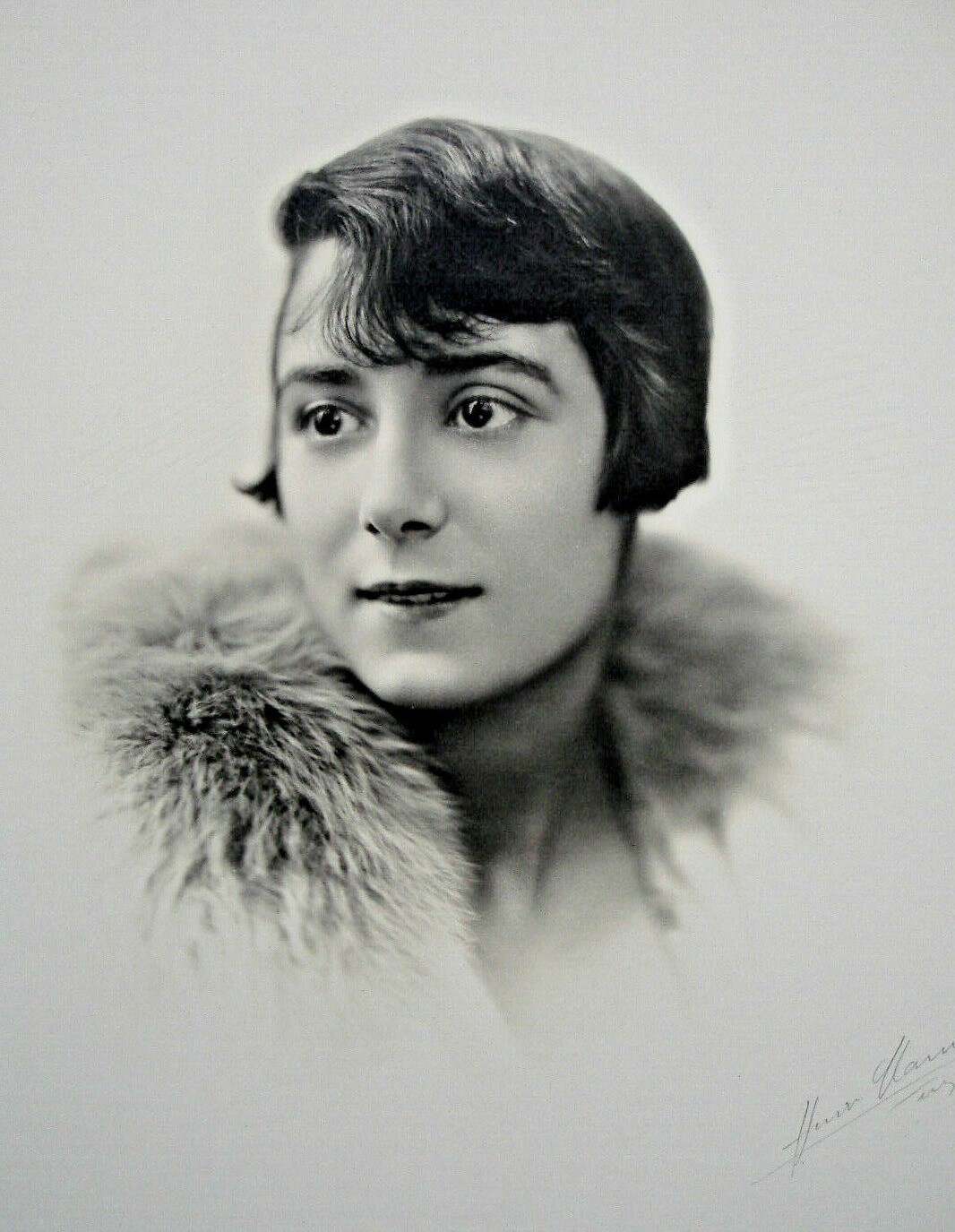
- Born: 9 October 1902; Paris, France
- Died: 5 August 2000 (aged 97); Lagny-sur-Marne, Seine-et-Marne, France
- Other name: Renée Blanche Deteix
- Occupation: Actress
- Years active: 1921–1968 (film)

Renée Devillers (1902–2000) was a French stage and film actress.

== Selected filmography ==
- The Sweetness of Loving (1930)
- The Man of the Hour (1937)
- J'accuse! (1938)
- The Blue Veil (1942)
- Business Is Business (1942)
- The Woman I Loved Most (1942)
- Roger la Honte (1946)
- False Identity (1947)
- Monelle (1948)
- The Last Vacation (1948)
- The Lame Devil (1948)
- Cartouche, King of Paris (1950)
- The Call of Destiny (1953)
- Mam'zelle Nitouche (1954)
- Thérèse Desqueyroux (1962)

== Bibliography ==
- Goble, Alan. The Complete Index to Literary Sources in Film. Walter de Gruyter, 1999.
