= A Mother Returns =

1952 film

- DVD cover
- Directed by: Roberto Bianchi Montero
- Written by: Paolo Arnò; Roberto Bianchi Montero; Fiorenzo Fiorentini; Anton Giulio Majano; A.G. Rovighi
- Produced by: Paolo Arnò
- Starring: Leopoldo Valentini; Linda Sini; Gianni Rizzo
- Cinematography: Giovanni Pucci
- Edited by: Dolores Faraoni
- Music by: Carlo Innocenzi
- Production company: E.C.I.S.
- Distributed by: Indipendenti Regionali
- Release date: 4 September 1952
- Running time: 81 minutes
- Country: Italy
- Language: Italian

A Mother Returns (Italian: Una madre ritorna) is a 1952 Italian melodrama film directed by Roberto Bianchi Montero and starring Leopoldo Valentini, Linda Sini and Gianni Rizzo. The film's sets were designed by the art director Ivo Battelli.

== Main cast ==
- Leopoldo Valentini as Romolo
- Linda Sini as Elena Sardi
- Gianni Rizzo as Carlo
- Ermanno Randi as Dino Dauri
- Adalberto Roni as Gigetto
- Gisella Monaldi as Sora Lalla
- Saro Urzì as Nino

== Bibliography ==
- Chiti, Roberto & Poppi, Roberto. Dizionario del cinema italiano: Dal 1945 al 1959. Gremese Editore, 1991.
