= Irresistible Catherine =

1957 film

- Directed by: André Pergament
- Written by: André Pergament
- Based on: Irresistible Catherine by Jean des Vallières
- Produced by: Jacques Santu
- Starring: Michel Auclair; Marie Daëms; Fernand Sardou
- Cinematography: Michel Rocca
- Edited by: Fanchette Mazin
- Music by: Francis Lopez
- Production company: Compagnie d'Art Technique
- Distributed by: Société Nouvelle de Cinématographie
- Release date: 10 May 1957
- Running time: 80 minutes
- Country: France
- Language: French

Irresistible Catherine (French: L'irrésistible Catherine) is a 1957 French comedy film directed by André Pergament and starring Michel Auclair, Marie Daëms and Fernand Sardou.

== Cast ==
- Michel Auclair as Georges Bartone
- Marie Daëms as Catherine Revering
- Fernand Sardou as Bouche
- Robert Vattier as Me Revering
- René Bergeron as Le colonel
- Lil Carina as La choriste
- Catherine Cellier as Une entraîneuse
- Jean Clarieux as Le boucher
- Robert Dalban as La voix de Pearl
- Julia Dancourt as Une entraîneuse
- Nane Germon as Mme Martin
- Albert Hugues as Le pianiste
- Abel Jores as Le barman
- Maïa Jusanova as La danseuse
- Robert Le Fort as Victor
- Jean Ozenne as Lorre
- Floriane Prévot as Rosette
- Gisèle Robert as Miss Grenelle

== Bibliography ==
- Goble, Alan. The Complete Index to Literary Sources in Film. Walter de Gruyter, 1999.
