= Dany Robin =

French actress (1927–1995)

- Born: Danielle Robin; 14 April 1927; Clamart, France
- Died: 25 May 1995 (aged 68); Paris, France
- Occupation: Actress
- Years active: 1930–1969
- Spouse(s): Georges Marchal (1951–1969; 2 children); Michael Sullivan (1969–1995)

Dany Robin (French pronunciation: [dani ʁɔbɛ̃]; 14 April 1927 – 25 May 1995) was a French actress of the 1950s and the 1960s. Nicknamed ‘la petite fiancée de la France’ (France's little fiancée) in the post-war years, she became one of the leading female stars of the 1950s, moving from the role of ‘ingénue’ to that of saucy Parisienne. She played the leading lady in Topaz (1969).

== Career ==
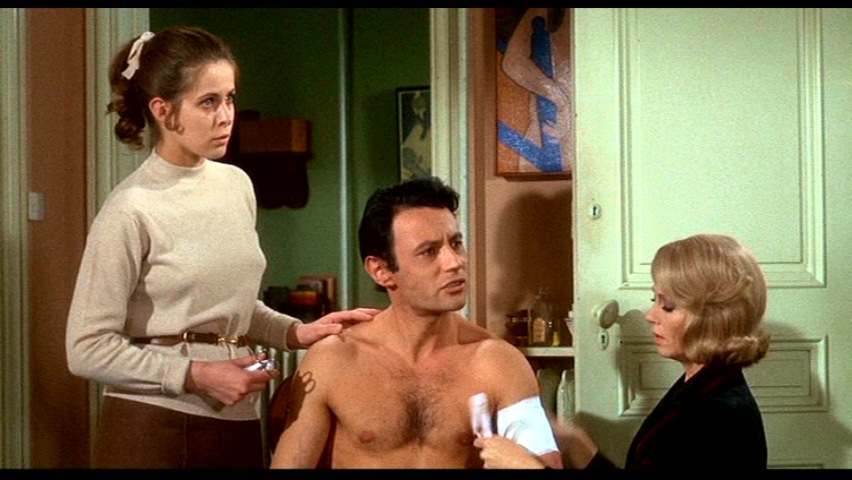
Claude Jade, Michel Subor and Dany Robin in Alfred Hitchcock's Topaz

Robin was born Danielle Robin in Clamart. She won first prize in dance at the Conservatoire de Paris in 1943, followed by a first prize in comedy. After small parts, she starred alongside Louis Jouvet in Henri Decoin's Monelle in 1947, in Guy Lefranc's Une histoire d’amour in 1951, and in 1953 with Jean Marais in two comedies: The Lovers of Midnight and Julietta. Audiences fell under the spell of the young bohemian girl she portrayed in 1954 in André Hunebelle's Cadet Rousselle or as Frou-Frou. She performed with Peter Sellers in The Waltz of the Toreadors, and co-starred opposite Kirk Douglas in the 1953 romantic drama Act of Love. Robin co-starred with Connie Francis, Paula Prentiss, and Janis Paige in Follow the Boys (1963). She ended her film career after a final ambiguous role in Alfred Hitchcock's Topaz (1969): she plays the wife of a secret agent (Frederick Stafford), the mother of a daughter (Claude Jade) married to a journalist (Michel Subor), and also the mistress of a spy (Michel Piccoli). . She made her final stage appearance during the summer of 1994 in Jean Anouilh's play Le Bal des voleurs (Thieves' Carnival) as part of the Festival d'Anjou.

== Personal life and death ==
Robin was married to fellow actor Georges Marchal. On 25 May 1995, she and her second husband, Michael Sullivan, died in a fire in their apartment in Paris.

== Selected filmography ==
- Lunegarde (1946) - Martine
- Gates of the Night (1946) - Étiennette
- Six heures à perdre (1947) - Rosy
- Destiny Has Fun (1947) - Gabrielle
- Man About Town (1947) - Lucette
- Naughty Martine (1947) - Martine
- Une jeune fille savait (1948) - Corinne
- Monelle (1948) - Monelle Picart
- The Passenger (1949) - Nicole Vernier
- The Unexpected Voyager (1950) - Dany
- The Little Zouave (1950) - Hélène
- Thirst of Men (1950) - Julie
- The Prettiest Sin in the World (1951) - Zoé
- Two Pennies Worth of Violets (1951) - Thérèse Delbez
- Young Love (1951) - Catherine Mareuil
- Twelve Hours of Happiness (1952) - Yvette Cornet
- She and Me (1952) - Juliette Capulet épouse Montaigu
- Holiday for Henrietta (1952) - Henriette
- The Lovers of Midnight (1953) - Françoise Letanneur
- Julietta (1953) - Julietta Valendor
- Act of Love (1953) - Lise Gudayec / Madame Teller
- Tempi nostri - Zibaldone n. 2 (1954) - Lei
- Les Révoltés de Lomanach (1954) - Monique de Lomanach
- Cadet Rousselle (1954) - Violetta Carlino
- Stopover in Orly (1955) - Michèle Tellier dite 'Baby Face'
- Napoléon (1955) - Désirée Clary
- Frou-Frou (1955) - Antoinette Dubois dit 'Frou-Frou'
- Maid in Paris (1956) - Penny Benson
- It Happened in Aden (1956) - Albine
- Bonsoir Paris, bonjour l'amour (1956) - Annick Bernier
- Let's Be Daring, Madame (1957) - Danielle
- It's All Adam's Fault (1958) - Eléonore 'Nora' de Savigny
- Quand sonnera midi (1958) - Christine Dumartin
- School for Coquettes (1958) - Ginette Masson
- Mimi Pinson (1958) - Mimi Pinson
- Suivez-moi jeune homme (1958) - Françoise Marceau
- Les Dragueurs (1959) - Denise
- Le Secret du chevalier d'Éon (1959) - La comtesse de Monval
- Grounds for Divorce (1960) - Marylin
- Love and the Frenchwoman (1960) - Nicole Perret (segment "Adultère, L'")
- Famous Love Affairs (1961) - Madame de Monaco (segment "Lauzun")
- Tales of Paris (1962) - Antonia (segment "Antonia")
- Waltz of the Toreadors (1962) - Ghislaine
- Left-Hand Drive (1962) - Catherine
- The Mysteries of Paris (1962) - Irène
- Mandrin (1962) - Baronne d'Escourt
- Follow the Boys (1963) - Michele Perrier
- How Do You Like My Sister? (1964) - Martine Jolivet
- La corde au cou (1965) - Isabelle
- Don't Lose Your Head (1966) - Jacqueline
- The Best House in London (1969) - Babette
- Topaz (1969) - Nicole Devereaux (final film role)
