= Jacqueline Porel =

French actress

- Born: 14 October 1918; Divonne-les-Bains, Ain, France
- Died: 29 April 2012 (aged 93); Boulogne-Billancourt, Hauts-de-Seine, France
- Occupation: Actress
- Years active: 1935–1977 (film)
- Spouse(s): François Périer (m. 1941; div. 1947) Gérard Landry (m. 1951, divorced)
- Children: 4, including Jean-Marie Périer, Anne-Marie Périer and Marc Porel

Jacqueline Porel (1918–2012) was a French stage and film actress. She was also a voice actor, dubbing foreign films for release in French-speaking markets. She was married to the actor Gérard Landry.

== Filmography ==
| Year | Title | Role | Notes |
|---|---|---|---|
| 1935 | Les beaux jours | | |
| 1938 | Youth in Revolt | Marthe | |
| 1938 | Heroes of the Marne | Hélène Bardin | |
| 1941 | Romance of Paris | Madeleine | |
| 1945 | The Great Pack | Agnès de Charançay | |
| 1946 | Mensonges | Corinne Martinage | |
| 1947 | Third at Heart | Dina | |
| 1950 | Le 84 prend des vacances | Mimi Jonquille | |
| 1950 | My Friend Sainfoin | Yolande | |
| 1952 | La Vérité sur Bébé Donge | Françoise | |
| 1952 | Les surprises d'une nuit de noces | Muriel Herbillon | |
| 1952 | Full House | Denise | (segment "L'alibi de monsieur Wens") |
| 1952 | Desperate Decision | Mother Superior | |
| 1953 | The Call of Destiny | Lucienne Lombardi | |
| 1953 | The Drunkard | Lucienne Marignan | |
| 1954 | Vestire gli ignudi | Fidanzata di Ludovico | |
| 1954 | Tourments | Simone Rebeira | |
| 1955 | Razzia sur la chnouf | Solange Birot | |
| 1955 | Les Nuits de Montmartre | | |
| 1956 | Ce soir les jupons volent | Monique la responsable des défiles | |
| 1957 | Young Girls Beware | Madame Cora | |
| 1959 | Twelve Hours By the Clock | Barbara | Voice |
| 1959 | Marie of the Isles | | |
| 1960 | Préméditation | Madame Lenoir | |
| 1960 | Love and the Frenchwoman | Mme. Bazouche | (segment "Enfance, L'") |
| 1960 | Captain Blood | Léonora Galigaï | |
| 1960 | La Vérité | La secrétaire de Me Guérin | |
| 1962 | Love on a Pillow | Madame Le Theil - la mère de Geneviève | |
| 1962 | Five Miles to Midnight | | |
| 1963 | Germinal | Madame Maigrat | |
| 1964 | Anatomy of a Marriage: My Days with Françoise | Line | |
| 1964 | Anatomy of a Marriage: My Days with Jean-Marc | Line | |
| 1970 | The Lady in the Car with Glasses and a Gun | 2nd Secretary | |
| 1970 | Promise at Dawn | Madame Mailer | |
| 1977 | Une femme, un jour... | Le mère | |

== Bibliography ==
- Edwards, Paul M. . World War I on Film: English Language Releases through 2014. McFarland, 2016.
