= Doctor Laennec =

1949 film

- Directed by: Maurice Cloche
- Written by: Maurice Cloche; Jean Bernard-Luc
- Produced by: Maurice Cloche
- Starring: Pierre Blanchar; Saturnin Fabre; Mireille Perrey
- Cinematography: Claude Renoir
- Edited by: Renée Gary
- Music by: Jean-Jacques Grünenwald
- Production companies: Interfrance Film; Les Films Maurice Cloche
- Distributed by: A.I.C.
- Release date: 17 June 1949
- Running time: 95 minutes
- Country: France
- Language: French

Doctor Laennec (French: Docteur Laennec) is a 1949 French historical drama film directed by Maurice Cloche and starring Pierre Blanchar, Saturnin Fabre and Mireille Perrey. It portrays the work of René Laennec, the inventor of the stethoscope.

The film's art direction was by Robert-Jules Garnier and René Renoux.

== Cast ==
- Pierre Blanchar as Dr. René, Théophile Laennec
- Saturnin Fabre as Laennec père
- Mireille Perrey as Jacquemine d'Argout-Laennec
- Pierre Dux as Prof. Récamier
- Jany Holt as Madeleine Bayle
- Geymond Vital as Dr. Pierre Bayle
- Janine Viénot as Marie-Anne Laennec
- Jean Toulout as Docteur Broussais
- Jacques Dynam as Meriadec
- Lannier as Docteur Louis
- Florent Antony as Beaugendre
- Francette Vernillat as La fille du Docteur Bayle
- Nicolas Amato
- Charles Bouillaud as Un domestique
- René Clermont as Le mime
- Paul Demage as Le client enrhumé
- France Descaut as Clarisse d'Anthiages
- Christian Duvaleix as Le charlatan
- Guy Favières as Le vieillard
- Georges Galley
- Léon Larive as Un médecin
- Palmyre Levasseur as Angélique
- Henri Maïk
- Raphaël Patorni as Un malade
- Georges Paulais as Un médecin
- Marcelle Praince as La duchesse
- Nicole Riche as La moribonde
- Max Rogerys
- Lina Roxa
- Eliane Salmon
- Evelyne Salmon
- Charles Vissières as L'éditeur

== Bibliography ==
- Crisp, C.G. The classic French cinema, 1930-1960. Indiana University Press, 1993
