= Maurice Griffe =

French screenwriter (1921–2013)

- Born: 16 June 1921; Creil, Oise, France
- Died: 6 December 2013 (aged 92)
- Occupation: Writer
- Years active: 1943–1959 (film)

Maurice Griffe (1921–2013) was a French screenwriter. He also worked as an assistant director on two films.

== Selected filmography ==
- Colonel Chabert (1943)
- Paris Frills (1945)
- Father Goriot (1945)
- Women's Games (1946)
- Antoine and Antoinette (1947)
- Last Refuge (1947)
- Cruise for the Unknown One (1948)
- Impeccable Henri (1948)
- Rendezvous in July (1949)
- Mystery in Shanghai (1950)
- Lovers of Toledo (1953)
- Ali Baba and the Forty Thieves (1954)
- Touchez pas au grisbi (1954)
- Mademoiselle from Paris (1955)
- Houla Houla (1959)

== Bibliography ==
- Hardy, Phil. The BFI Companion to Crime. A&C Black, 1997.
