= Gisèle Grandpré =

French actress

- Born: 28 November 1912; Nancy, Meurthe-et-Moselle, France
- Died: 19 October 2002 (aged 89); Saint-Just-d'Ardèche, Ardèche, France
- Occupation: Actress
- Years active: 1943–1981(Film and TV)

Gisèle Grandpré (1912–2002) was a French actress of film, theatre and television. A character actress, she generally appeared in supporting roles. Her film appearances include the Brittany-set The Lost Girl (1954)

== Selected filmography ==
- The Man Without a Name (1943)
- My Brother from Senegal (1953)
- The Lovers of Midnight (1953)
- The Beautiful Otero (1954)
- The Lost Girl (1954)
- Men in White (1955)
- The Singer from Mexico (1957)
- Elevator to the Gallows (1958)
- Coplan Takes Risks (1964)
- The Umbrellas of Cherbourg (1964)

== Bibliography ==
- Berthomé, Jean-Pierre & Naizet, Gaël. Bretagne et cinéma: cent ans de création cinématographique en Bretagne. Cinémathèque de Bretagne, 1995.
