= Domenica (1952 film) =

- Directed by: Maurice Cloche
- Written by: Jacques Deval; Maurice Cloche
- Produced by: Maurice Cloche
- Starring: Odile Versois; Jean-Pierre Kérien; Albert Dinan
- Cinematography: Nicolas Hayer
- Edited by: Renée Gary
- Music by: Marceau Van Hoorebecke
- Production company: Les Films Maurice Cloche
- Distributed by: L'Alliance Générale de Distribution Cinématographique
- Release date: 9 January 1952
- Running time: 97 minutes
- Country: France
- Language: French

Domenica is a 1952 French drama film directed by Maurice Cloche and starring Odile Versois, Jean-Pierre Kérien and Albert Dinan. It was shot entirely on location in Corsica.

== Cast ==
- Odile Versois as Domenica Léandri
- Jean-Pierre Kérien as Giuseppe Léandri
- Albert Dinan as Carlo
- Alain Quercy as Patrice
- Janine Zorelli as La Colombani

== Bibliography ==
- Crisp, C.G. The Classic French Cinema, 1930-1960. Indiana University Press, 1993
