= Shock Troops (film) =

1967 film by Costa-Gavras

- Film poster
- Directed by: Costa-Gavras
- Written by: Jean-Pierre Chabrol; Costa-Gavras
- Produced by: Costa-Gavras
- Starring: Charles Vanel
- Cinematography: Jean Tournier
- Edited by: Christian Gaudin
- Music by: Michel Magne
- Distributed by: Les Artistes Associés
- Release date: 5 April 1967
- Running time: 110 minutes
- Countries: France; Italy
- Language: French

Shock Troops (French: Un homme de trop) is a 1967 French-Italian action drama film directed by Costa-Gavras. It was entered into the 5th Moscow International Film Festival. Film producer Harry Saltzman has a "presented by" credit.

== Plot ==
Set in central France, the film follows a group of French resistance fighters who mount attacks on occupying German forces during World War II. They break into a prison and release some prisoners facing imminent execution, but suspect there may be an informer amongst them. As their campaign continues, they have to decide his fate.

== Cast ==
- Charles Vanel as Passevin
- Bruno Cremer as Cazal
- Jean-Claude Brialy as Jean
- Michel Piccoli as The Extra Man
- Gérard Blain as Thomas
- Claude Brasseur as Groubec
- Jacques Perrin as Kerk
- François Périer as Moujon
- Claude Brosset as Ouf
- Pierre Clémenti as Lucian
- Michel Creton as Solin
- Paolo Fratini as Philippe
- Julie Dassin as Girl
- Nino Segurini as Lecocq
- Marc Porel as Octave

== Production ==
Following the success of his first feature film, The Sleeping Car Murders, Costa-Gavras was approached by American producer Harry Saltzman, who gave him free rein over his next project. The filmmaker then expressed a desire to adapt André Malraux's La Condition humaine, but this idea alarmed Saltzman. The latter subsequently proposed Jean-Pierre Chabrol's novel about the French Resistance.
