= A Woman's Treasure =

1953 film

- Directed by: Jean Stelli
- Written by: Françoise Giroud; Marc-Gilbert Sauvajon
- Produced by: Evrard de Rouvre
- Starring: François Périer; Marie Daëms; Jacques Morel
- Cinematography: Jean Isnard
- Edited by: Paul Cayatte
- Music by: René Sylviano
- Production company: Véga Films
- Distributed by: La Société des Films Sirius
- Release date: 11 February 1953
- Running time: 85 minutes
- Country: France
- Language: French

A Woman's Treasure (French: Un trésor de femme) is a 1953 French comedy film directed by Jean Stelli and starring François Périer, Marie Daëms and Jacques Morel. The film's sets were designed by the art director Jacques Colombier.

== Synopsis ==
François goes to the jewellers to get a ring for his fiancée Isabelle. However a stranger, Sophie, tries the ring on and it gets stuck. François has to follow her around in order to try and get the ring back and the two think they have fallen in love. However, both eventually return to their existing partners.

== Cast ==
- François Périer as François Delaroche
- Marie Daëms as Sophie Brunet
- Renée Cosima as Isabelle Villier-Boulard
- Jacques Morel as Albert Brunet
- Georges Vitray as M. Villlier-Boulard - le père d'Isabelle
- Suzanne Norbert as La mère d'Isabelle
- Jacques Pierre as Olivier
- Betty Daussmond as La grand-mère
- René Hell as Le gardien
- François Joux as Un dîneur
- Jacques Denoël as Lucien
- Luce Fabiole as Célestine
- Marguerite Garcya as Madame Delaroche
- Lise Graf as Marthe
- Suzanne Guémard as Madame Villier-Boulard
- Daniel Ceccaldi as Le docteur
- Marcella Sansonetti as La tante
- Robert Seller as Joseph

== Bibliography ==
- Bessy, Maurice & Chirat, Raymond. Histoire du cinéma français: 1951-1955. Pygmalion, 1989.
- Rège, Philippe. Encyclopedia of French Film Directors, Volume 1. Scarecrow Press, 2009.
