= A Man Walks in the City =

1950 film directed by Marcello Pagliero

- Directed by: Marcello Pagliero
- Written by: Jean Jausion (novel); Marcello Pagliero
- Produced by: Sacha Gordine
- Starring: Jean-Pierre Kérien; Ginette Leclerc; Robert Dalban
- Cinematography: Nicolas Hayer
- Edited by: Pierre Cholot
- Production company: Films Sacha Gordine
- Distributed by: Les Films Corona
- Release date: 22 March 1950
- Running time: 95 minutes
- Country: France
- Language: French

A Man Walks in the City (French: Un homme marche dans la ville) is a 1950 French drama film directed by Marcello Pagliero, and starring Jean-Pierre Kérien, Ginette Leclerc and Robert Dalban. Location shooting took place around Le Havre in Normandy. The film's sets were designed by art director Maurice Colasson.

== Cast ==
- Jean-Pierre Kérien as Jean Sauviot
- Ginette Leclerc as Madeleine
- Robert Dalban as Laurent
- Grégoire Aslan as Ambilarès
- Yves Deniaud as Albert
- André Valmy as Le commissaire
- Dora Doll as La fille
- Fréhel as La femme de Buck
- Sylvie Deniau as La soeur de Madeleine
- Christiane Lénier as Georgette
- Maryse Paillet as Tantine
- Fabien Loris as Dago
- Pierre Léaud as L'ordonnateur
- Grégoire Gromoff as Olen
- Jérôme Goulven as Muller
