= Let's Be Daring, Madame =

1957 film

- Directed by: Robert Vernay
- Written by: Michel André (play); Solange Térac; Robert Vernay
- Produced by: Raymond Horvilleur; Jean Hébey
- Starring: Dany Robin; Marie Daëms; Louis Velle
- Cinematography: André Germain
- Edited by: Jeannette Berton
- Music by: Michel Emer
- Production company: Films Hergi
- Distributed by: Les Films Fernand Rivers
- Release date: 7 June 1957
- Running time: 84 minutes
- Country: France
- Language: French

Let's Be Daring, Madame (French: Le coin tranquille) is a 1957 French comedy film directed by Robert Vernay and starring Dany Robin, Marie Daëms and Louis Velle. It was shot at the Saint-Maurice Studios in Paris and on location in the Forest of Rambouillet. The film's sets were designed by the art director Claude Bouxin.

== Synopsis ==
After they get stranded in the woods on a camping expedition, two friends try to take shelter in an isolated house.

== Cast ==
- Dany Robin as Danielle
- Marie Daëms as Lulu
- Louis Velle as Jean
- Jacques Jouanneau as Dédé la Matraque
- Jess Hahn as Edward Butterfield dit 'Eddy'
- Armande Navarre as Alice
- Pauline Carton as La chef des choristes
- Max Elloy as Le brigadier
- Henri Charrett as Un gendarme
- Christian Lude as Un gendarme
- Claude Lary as Le gendarme radio
- Jackie Sardou as Une passagère du premier car
- Georges Demas as Le chauffeur du car des touristes / Le motard au barrage
- Henri Virlojeux as Le cantonnier
- Noël Roquevert as Le père Mathieu

== Bibliography ==
- Bessy, Maurice. Histoire du cinéma français: 1956-1960. Pygmalion, 1986.
