= Marc Porel =

French actor (1949-1983)

- Born: Marc Michel Marrier de Lagatinerie; 3 January 1949; Lausanne, Switzerland
- Died: 15 August 1983 (aged 34); Casablanca, Morocco
- Occupation: Actor
- Years active: 1967–1983
- Spouses: Bénédicte Lacoste (divorced); Barbara Magnolfi (m. 1977)
- Children: 1
- Parent(s): Gérard Landry; Jacqueline Porel
- Relatives: Gabrielle Réjane (great-grandmother); Jean-Marie Périer (half brother)

Marc Michel Marrier de Lagatinerie (3 January 1949 – 15 August 1983), known professionally as Marc Porel, was a Swiss-born French film actor. He appeared in 40 films between 1967 and 1983.

== Life and career ==
Porel was born in Lausanne, Switzerland in 1949. He was the son of Jacqueline Porel (1918–2012), a French actress and granddaughter of Gabrielle Réjane, and Gérard Landry, an Argentine-born actor.

He made his film debut at age 18 in Costa-Gavras' Shock Troops. This was followed by major roles in The Sicilian Clan (1969) and La Horse (1970), both starring Jean Gabin. In 1970, he appeared in Georges Lautner's The Road to Salina. He was a leading man in Édouard Molinaro's The Most Gentle Confessions and Un peu de soleil dans l'eau froide (both 1971).

Beginning with the Lucio Fulci's 1972 giallo Don't Torture a Duckling, Porel worked primarily in Italian films. He had supporting roles in two films directed by Luchino Visconti: Ludwig (1973) and his final film The Innocent (1976). That same year, he was the lead in a poliziottesco film, Live Like a Cop, Die Like a Man, in which he played one half of a buddy cop duo with Ray Lovelock. One of his last acting roles was in Il Marchese del Grillo (1981), an Alberto Sordi period comedy.

== Personal life ==
Porel had three half siblings, one from an affair his mother had with the singer Henri Salvador : his brother Jean-Marie Périer, and two from her marriage to actor François Périer : his brother Jean-Pierre and sister Anne-Marie.

He was married twice, first to French model Bénédicte Lacoste, with whom he had a daughter. They divorced, and he remarried to Italian actress Barbara Magnolfi. In the early 1970s, he was in a romantic relationship with Nathalie Delon.

=== Death ===
Following the death of his half-brother Jean-Pierre, Porel became increasingly relient on heroin. He died of an overdose in Casablanca on 15 August 1983. He is buried at Passy Cemetery in Paris with his family.

== Filmography ==
=== Film ===
Year	Title	Role	Director	Notes
1967	Shock Troops	Octave	Costa-Gavras	
1967	Des garçons et des filles	Pierre	Étienne Périer	
1969	Secret World	Olivier	Paul Feyder	
1969	The Sicilian Clan	Sergio Manalese	Henri Verneuil	
1970	La Horse	Henri	Pierre Granier-Deferre	
1970	Last Leap	Le danseur arrêté	Édouard Luntz	
1970	Road to Salina	Rocky	Georges Lautner	
1970	Tumuc Humac	Marc	Jean-Marie Périer	
1971	The Most Gentle Confessions	Jean Dubreuil	Édouard Molinaro	
1971	Un peu de soleil dans l'eau froide	Gilles Lantier	Jacques Deray	
1972	Don't Torture a Duckling	Don Alberto Avallone	Lucio Fulci	
1973	Ludwig	Richard Hornig	Luchino Visconti	
1973	Un officier de police sans importance	Camille	Jean Larriaga	Also screenwriter
1973	Tony Arzenta	Domenico Maggio	Duccio Tessari	
1974	Virilità	Roberto	Paolo Cavara	
1974	Die Ameisen kommen	Alain	Jochen Richter	
1974	Nipoti miei diletti	Marco	Franco Rossetti	
1975	Loaded Guns	Manuel	Fernando Di Leo	
1976	Soldier of Fortune	Duke of Namur	Pasquale Festa Campanile	
1976	Live Like a Cop, Die Like a Man	Fred	Ruggero Deodato	
1976	The Innocent	Filippo d'Arborio	Luchino Visconti	
1977	Sette note in nero	Luca Fattori	Lucio Fulci	
1977	A Spiral of Mist	Fabrizio Sangermano	Eriprando Visconti	
1977	Quand la ville s'éveille	Alex Ridzi	Pierre Grasset	
1977	Difficile morire		Umberto Silva	
1978	Blazing Flowers	Pino Scalise	Gianni Martucci	
1978	Porci con la P 38	Morris	Gianfranco Pagani	
1978	La Sorella di Ursula	Filippo Andrei / Gianni Nardi	Enzo Milioni	
1979	L'albero della maldicenza	Mario	Giacinto Bonacquisti	
1980	Je vais craquer	Christian	François Leterrier	
1980	La pagella	Vincenzo Saliani	Ninì Grassia	
1981	La disubbidienza	Alfio	Aldo Lado	
1981	Il Marchese del Grillo	Blanchard	Mario Monicelli	
1983	Delitto carnale	Max	Cesare Canevari	

=== Television ===
Year	Title	Role	Director	Notes
1969	SOS-Fréquence-17	Bernard Ogier	Jean Dréville	1 episode
1975	Il marsigliese	Pierre Toriel	Giacomo Battiato	3 episodes
1979	Histoires insolites	Denis Braque	Pierre Grimblat	1 episode
1979	The Devil's Game	Matthieu	Lamberto Bava; Mario Bava	1 episode
1982	La Certosa di Parma	Lieutenant Robert	Mauro Bolognini	2 episodes
