= Gérard Landry =

Argentine actor (1912–1999)

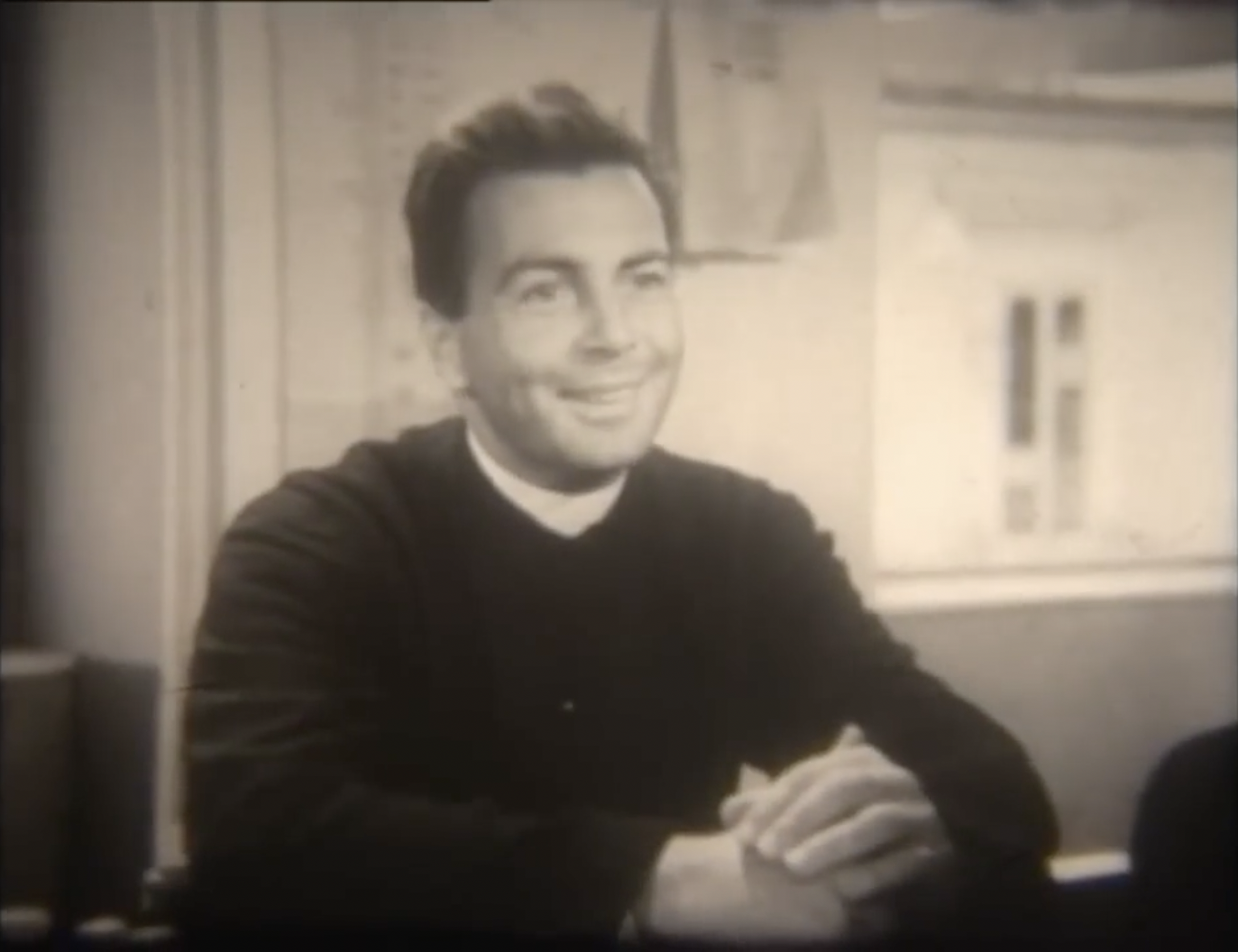
- Landry in Solo Dio mi fermerà (1957)
- Born: Landry Fernand Charles Marrier de Lagatinerie; 16 October 1912; Buenos Aires, Argentina
- Died: 18 September 1999 (aged 86); Nice, France
- Occupation: Actor
- Years active: 1932–1986
- Spouse(s): Jacqueline Porel (1951, divorced); Janine Darcey (19??–1993; her death)
- Children: Marc Porel

Landry Fernand Charles Marrier de Lagatinerie (16 October 1912 – 18 September 1999), known professionally as Gérard Landry, was an Argentine and French actor. He began acting in 1932 with his first movie Mirages de Paris, acted for over fifty years, and has been in over ninety films. Landry also starred in Les Trottoirs de Bangkok (The Sidewalks of Bangkok), a film from French director Jean Rollin.

== Life ==
Landry married twice. His first wife was actress Jacqueline Porel (1918-2012), they had a son, actor Marc Porel, but the marriage ended in divorce. His second wife was Janine Darcey (1917–1993). Gérard Landry died 18 September 1999 in Nice, France, aged 86.

== Filmography ==
Film
Year	Title	Role	Notes
1932	Mirages de Paris		
1932	Tossing Ship		other title – Coups de Roulis
1933	L'Épervier		
1938	Chéri-Bibi	Gérard	Uncredited
1938	The Patriot	Le Tsarévitch	
1938	La Bête Humaine	Le fils Dauvergne	(credited as Gerard Landry) other title – Judas was a Woman
1939	Nord-Atlantique	Jaspers	
1940	Paradis Perdu	Gérard Aubujan	other title – Paradise Lost
1941	Vénus Aveugle	Gazul	Uncredited, other title – Blind Venus
1942	Cap au Large	François	
1942	Les Hommes Sans Peur	Jacques Monval	other title – Man Without Fear
1944	Behold Beatrice	José	other title – Behold Beatrice
1944	Death No Longer Awaits	Claude Desbordes	
1946	Lunegarde	Georges Costes	
1949	Barry	Sylvain Bavoizet	
1950	Le 84 Prend des Vacances	Pierrot	
1950	La Nuit S'achève	Jean-Louis	
1951	Night Without Stars	Pierre Chaval	
1951	Casabianca	Lt. Dalac	other title – Pirate Submarine
1951	Serenade to the Executioner	Didier Laurent	
1951	Love and Desire	Gérard – le jeune premier	
1952	Une Enfant dans la Tourmente	Emile Ferronais	
1952	La Chasse à L'homme		Short
1953	Lovers of Toledo	Fernando de la Cierva	other title – Les Amants de Tolède
1953	L'étrange Amazone	Dr. Pierre Fournier	
1953	Le Club des 400 Coups	Gérard Ginot	
1953	The Slave	Bernard Turenne	other title – L'esclave
1953	The Blonde Gypsy	Pedro	other title – La Carque Blonde
1953	Musoduro	Romolo	other title – The Hunt
1953	Passionate Song	Albert Dupont	
1954	The Lost Girl	Jean-Marie Kermadec	
1954	Cento Serenate	Dick Nelson	
1954	Tua per la Vita	Guido Vagliasco	
1956	Rigoletto	Count of Mantua	other title – Rigoletto
1956	Lo Spadaccino Misterioso	Duca Ubaldo	other title – The Mysterious Swordsman
1956	Trapeze	Chikki	(credited as Gerard Landry)
1956	Giovanni dalle Bande Nere	Gasparo, the Traitor	other title – The Violent Patriot
1956	La Rivale	Maggiore Roberto Serni	other title – The Rival
1956	Kean	Principe di Galles	other title – Kean: Genius or Scoundrel
1957	The Black Devil	Osvaldo de' Marzi	
1957	Solo Dio mi fermerà	Don Salvatore D'Angelo	
1957	Orizzonte Infuocato	Roberto	
1958	The Day the Sky Exploded	Landowsky	Uncredited
1958	Pirate of the Black Hawk	Capitan Riccardo	other titles – Pirates of the Black Hawk
1959	Knight Without a Country	Rolando	other titles – Il cavaliere senza terra, The Faceless Rider
1959	L'arciere Nero	Corrado	other title – The Black Archer
1959	Attack of the Moors	Gontrano	other titles – I Reali di Francia, The Kings of France
1959	Avvent in Città	Enrico	
1960	5 Branded Women		
1960	The Enemy General	Navarre	
1960	Knight of 100 Faces	Capitano delle Guardie	other title –
1960	Caccia al Marito	Duke Massimo	(credited ad Gerard Landry)
1960	Pirates of the Coast	Prosecutor	
1960	Ferragosto in bikini	Franz Heinrich	
1960	Caravan Petrol		
1961	Spade Senza Bandiera	Costanzo	other title – Sword Without a Country
1961	The Bacchantes	Shepherd Poet	other titles – Bondage Gladiator Sexy
1961	Capitani de Ventura	Brunello Montenotte	other title – Rampage of Evil
1962	Il Sangue e la Sfida		other title – Blood and Difiance
1962	La Marcia su Roma	Milziade Bellinzoni	other title – March on Rome
1962	Re Manfredi	Riccardo	other title – The Defeat of the Barbarians
1963	Canzoni in... Bikini	Aristide Caro	
1964	Il Ribelle di Castelmont	Mardo Degli Ammannati	other title – Sword of Rebellion
1964	La Barca Sin Pescador	Ricardo Morton	
1966	Im Nest der gelben Viper		other title – FBI Operation Yellow Viper
1966	Río maldito	Doctor Clapper	other title – Seven Pistols for a Gringo
1966	El Primer Cuartel	Duque de Ahumada	
1967	Per Favore... Non Sparate Col Cannone	The Colonel	other title – The Million Dollar Countdown
1967	Con la Muerte a la Espalda	The Commissioner	other title – With Death on Your Back
1967	Mister Dynamit – Morgen küsst euch der Tod	Gen. Johnson	other title – Die Slowly, You'll Enjoy it More, Spy Today, Die Tomorrow
1967	Der Sarg bleibt heute zu	Commander Fernion	other title – Death on a Rainy Day, Scorpions and Miniskirts
1968	Horas Prohibidas		other title – Forbidden Hours
1971	La Casa delle Mele Mature	Husband of Marisa	
1971	The Most Gentle Confessions	Lopez	other title – Les Aveux les Plus Doux
1971	Trinity Is Still My Name	Lopert	other title – Continuavano a chiamarlo Trinità
1973	Even Angels Eat Beans	Spectator at the Catch contest	
1974	Il Bacio di una Morta	Henry de Bligny	
1974	Dr. Med. Mark Wedmann – Detektiv Inbegriffen	Waterstraat	Episode: "30 Stunden für Rom"
1975	Faccia di spia	Mr. Rutherford	other titles – C.I.A. Secret Story, Face of a Spy
1976	Laure		other title – Forever Emanuelle
1983	Stangata Napoletana		other title – Neapolitan Sting
1984	La Bella Otero	Thomas	TV movie
1984	Les Trottoirs de Bangkok	Rick	other title – The Sidewalks of Bangkok
1984	Tutti Dentro	Claudio Ferrero	
1985	Ne Prends pas les Poulets pour de Pigeons	Blanchard	
1986	Anemia	Il Nonno	TV movie, (final film role)
