= The Little Zouave =

1950 film

- Directed by: Gilles Grangier
- Written by: Pierre Laroche; Albert Valentin
- Produced by: Claude Dolbert
- Starring: François Périer; Dany Robin; Marie Daëms
- Cinematography: Marcel Grignon
- Edited by: Pierre Delannoy
- Music by: Vincent Scotto
- Production company: Codo Cinéma
- Distributed by: Union Française de Production Cinématographique
- Release date: 16 March 1950
- Running time: 104 minutes
- Country: France
- Language: French

The Little Zouave (French: Au p'tit zouave) is a 1950 French comedy drama film directed by Gilles Grangier and starring François Périer, Dany Robin and Marie Daëms. It was shot at the Billancourt Studios in Paris and on location in the city. The film's sets were designed by the art director Raymond Druart.

== Synopsis ==
The plot revolves around a café The Little Zouave in a working-class district of Paris, frequented by a variety of characters including its owner who acts as a fence for stolen items. When a new customer arrives and evasively describes himself as a journalist they suspect he make in fact be an undercover policeman.

== Cast ==
- François Périer as Monsieur Denis
- Dany Robin as Hélène
- Marie Daëms as Olga
- Jacques Morel as Félix Lambert
- Alice Field as Madame Billot
- Robert Le Fort as Un habitué du P'tit Zouave
- Bernard Lajarrige as Louis
- Paul Azaïs as Adolphe
- Marcel Delaître as Un inspecteur
- Émile Genevois as Le vendeur de journaux
- Renaud Mary as Eugène
- Arthur Devère as Le père Aubin – le croque-mort
- Robert Dalban as Armand Billot
- Henri Crémieux as Monsieur Florent
- Annette Poivre as Fernande
- Paul Frankeur as Le commissaire Bonnet
- Yves Deniaud as Henri

== Bibliography ==
- Bessy, Maurice & Chirat, Raymond. Histoire du cinéma français: encyclopédie des films, 1940–1950. Pygmalion, 1986
- Rège, Philippe. Encyclopedia of French Film Directors, Volume 1. Scarecrow Press, 2009.
