= Linda Sini =

Italian film actress (1924–1999)

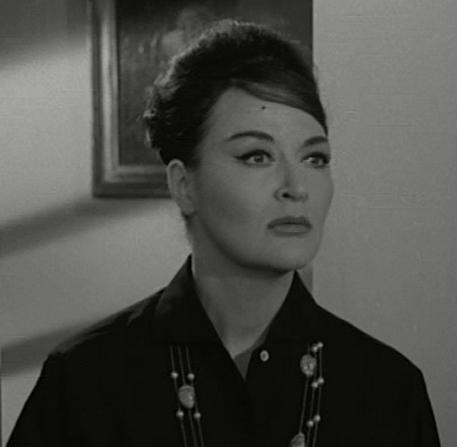
- Sini as Dora in I due pericoli pubblici (1964)
- Born: 13 February 1924; Boccioleto, Province of Vercelli, Kingdom of Italy
- Died: 5 February 1999 (aged 74); Rome, Italy
- Years active: 1950–1985

Linda Sini (13 February 1924 – 5 February 1999) was an Italian actress.

She made 75 appearances between 1950 and 1979 and several appearances after this, mostly in film.

Debuting in Sigillo rosso in 1950, she went on to star in films such as Luigi Zampa's comedy Anni ruggenti (1962), and the James Bond spy spoofs 002 operazione Luna and A 001, operazione Giamaica (1965).

Although primarily a film actress, she did appear in Joe Petrosino (1972) and in Il 90 in 1979. In 1986 she appeared in Anemia.

== Selected filmography ==
- Red Seal (1950)
- Bellissima (1951) - Mimmetta
- Salvate mia figlia (1951)
- Stranger on the Prowl (1952) - Signora Raffetto
- A Mother Returns (1952) - Elena
- Rimorso (1952)
- Beauties on Motor Scooters (1952) - Franca
- Cronaca di un delitto (1953) - Elena
- La prigioniera di Amalfi (1954)
- Bella non piangere (1955) - Stelle d'oro
- Accadde tra le sbarre (1955) - Marion
- Il conte Aquila (1955)
- Toto, Peppino, and the Hussy (1956) - Gabriella
- Gastone (1960) - Lucy
- Il Mattatore (1960) - Laura, wife of Chinotto
- Tough Guys (1960) - Barbara
- Il principe fusto (1960)
- I piaceri del sabato notte (1960) - Un cliente dell'atelier
- My Friend, Dr. Jekyll (1960) - Adelaide
- Trapped by Fear (1960) - La concierge
- The 1,000 Eyes of Dr. Mabuse (1960) - Corinna
- Le ambiziose (1961) - La pittrice
- Gli incensurati (1961) - La vedova
- Mars, God of War (1962) - Ecuba
- Roaring Years (1962) - Elsa
- Sherlock Holmes and the Deadly Necklace (1962) - Light Girl
- Il Sorpasso (1962) - Zia Lidia
- I 4 monaci (1962) - La moglie del farmacista
- Sexy Toto (1963) - Hostess
- The Conjugal Bed (1963) - Mother Superior
- Gli onorevoli (1963) - Wife of Rossani-Breschi
- Follie d'estate (1963) - Moglie del signore geloso
- The Commandant (1963) - La contessa
- I cuori infranti (1963) - Baronessa Von Tellen (segment "La manina di Fatma")
- Il treno del sabato (1964) - Linda
- Amore facile (1964) - Assuntina (segment "Un uomo corretto")
- I due pericoli pubblici (1964) - Dora
- The Adventurer of Tortuga (1965) - Paquita
- Our Man in Jamaica (1965) - Signora Cervantes
- 002 Operazione Luna (1965) - Leonidova
- I due parà (1965) - Consuelo
- The Man Who Laughs (1966) - Margherita
- War of the Planets (1966) - Lt. Fina Marlie
- Massacre Time (1966) - Brady
- Mi vedrai tornare (1966)
- Riderà! (Cuore matto) (1967) - Miss Fellow
- Spia spione (1967) - Margot
- Gangsters 70 (1968)
- The Longest Hunt (1968) - Dona Sol Gutierrez
- Shoot Twice (1968) - Saloon Madame
- Zingara (1969) - Maria Teresa
- Giacomo Casanova: Childhood and Adolescence (1969) - Mother Teresa
- Satiricosissimo (1970) - Agrippina
- Un caso di coscienza (1970) - Woman on train (uncredited)
- Sartana's Here... Trade Your Pistol for a Coffin (1970) - Maldida, Mantas' Woman
- La prima notte del dottor Danieli, industriale, col complesso del... giocattolo (1970) - Concettina
- Principe coronato cercasi per ricca ereditiera (1970) - Amelia
- They Call Me Hallelujah (1971) - Gertrude
- Ivanhoe, the Norman Swordsman (1971) - Mortimer's Wife
- Le inibizioni del dottor Gaudenzi, vedovo, col complesso della buonanima (1971) - Viscardi's Wife
- Seven Blood-Stained Orchids (1972) - Wanda
- Colpo grosso... grossissimo... anzi probabile (1972) - Sandro's mother
- Decameron n° 3 - Le più belle donne del Boccaccio (1972) - Maid of Isabella (segment "The Horny Horseman") (uncredited)
- Don't Torture a Duckling (1972) - Mrs. Lo Cascio - Bruno's Mother
- Poppea: A Prostitute in Service of the Emperor (1972) - Agrippina
- I racconti di Viterbury - Le più allegre storie del '300 (1973) - Madonna Brenda
- Fra' Tazio da Velletri (1973) - Cosima De' Pazzi
- Diario di una vergine romana (1973) - Lucilla
- Farfallon (1974) - Figlia del colonnello
- Paolo il freddo (1974) - Countess Manescalchi
- A Second Spring (1975) - Teresa
- White Fang and the Hunter (1975) - Luna
- Calore in provincia (1975) - Mother of Ciccio
- Operazione Kappa: sparate a vista (1977) - Isabella / Anna's neighbour
- La compagna di banco (1977) - Mrs. Girardi
- Ring (1978) - Assunta Esposito

== External links and sources ==
- Linda Sini at IMDb
