= Women's Games =

1946 film

- Directed by: Maurice Cloche
- Written by: Maurice Griffe
- Starring: Jacques Dumesnil; Hélène Perdrière; Saturnin Fabre
- Cinematography: Marcel Grignon
- Edited by: Renée Gary
- Music by: Wal Berg
- Production company: Edition et Diffusion Cinématographique
- Release date: 13 May 1946
- Running time: 98 minutes
- Country: France
- Language: French

Women's Games (French: Jeux de femmes) is a 1946 French comedy film directed by Maurice Cloche and starring Jacques Dumesnil, Hélène Perdrière and Saturnin Fabre.

The film's sets were designed by the art director Raymond Nègre.

== Cast ==
- Jacques Dumesnil as Stanislas
- Hélène Perdrière
- Saturnin Fabre as L'oncle Hubert
- Roger Bontemps
- Henri Crémieux
- Paul Demange as Le vendeur de poteries
- Renée Dennsy
- Jean Dunot
- René Fleur
- Jacky Flynt
- Arsenio Freignac
- Jeanne Helbling
- François Joux
- Lucienne Legrand
- Marcel Lestan
- Claire Mafféi
- Monique Manuel
- Jean Mercure
- Mila Parély as Solange
- Fred Pasquali as Simone
- Max Rogerys
- Maurice Salabert
- Ginette Wander

== Bibliography ==
- Rège, Philippe. Encyclopedia of French Film Directors, Volume 1. Scarecrow Press, 2009.
