= François Périer =

French actor (1919–2002)

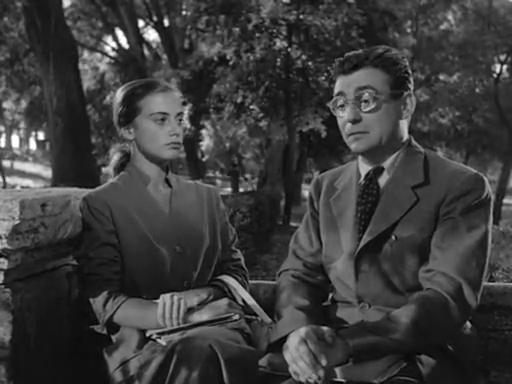
- Anna Maria Ferrero and Périer in It Happened in the Park (1953)
- Born: François Pillu; 10 November 1919; Paris, France
- Died: 28 June 2002 (aged 82); Paris, France
- Occupation: actor
- Years active: 1938–2000
- Spouses: Jacqueline Porel (m. 1941; div. 1947) Marie Daëms (m. 1949; div. 1959) Colette Boutouland (m. 1961)
- Children: Jean-Marie Périer; Anne-Marie Périer
- Awards: Best Foreign Actor; 1956 Gervaise

François Périer (French pronunciation: [fʁɑ̃swa peʁje]; born François Pillu; 10 November 1919 – 28 June 2002) was a French actor renowned for his expressiveness and diversity of roles.

== Career ==
He made over 110 film and TV appearances from 1938 to 1996, with notable excursion into the French avant-garde. He was also prominent in the theatre. Among his better-known parts was that of Hugo in the first production of Jean-Paul Sartre's Les Mains Sales in 1948. He was the narrator of the French-language version of Fantasia, and he made several commercial audio recordings (with commentary) popularizing classical music in France. In 1957, he won the BAFTA Award for Best Actor for his performance in the film Gervaise.

== Personal life ==
Périer was born in Paris, France on 10 November 1919. He had two children with his first wife, Jacqueline Porel: photographer Jean-Marie and journalist Anne-Marie. He died on 29 June 2002 in Paris of a heart attack during his sleep.

His remains were interred at Passy Cemetery in Paris next to those of the stage and silent film actress Réjane (1856–1920), who was the grandmother of Périer's first wife.

== Filmography ==
- 1938: Mother Love (directed by Jean Boyer) - Batilly
- 1938: Hôtel du Nord (directed by Marcel Carné) - Adrien
- 1939: La Fin du jour (directed by Julien Duvivier) - Le journaliste
- 1939: The Fatted Calf (directed by Serge de Poligny) - Gaston Vachon
- 1939: Nightclub Hostess (directed by Albert Valentin) - Jean
- 1941: Le Duel (directed by Pierre Fresnay) - Jean
- 1941: First Ball (directed by Christian-Jaque) - Ernest Vilar
- 1941: Happy Days (directed by Jean de Marguenat) - Bernard
- 1942: Love Marriage (directed by Henri Decoin) - Pierre
- 1942: Love Letters (directed by Claude Autant-Lara) - François de Portal
- 1943: The White Truck (directed by Léo Joannon) - François Ledru - un jeune garagiste
- 1943: La Ferme aux loups (directed by Richard Pottier) - Bastien
- 1944: Bonsoir mesdames, bonsoir messieurs (directed by Roland Tual) - Dominique Verdelet
- 1944: L'Enfant de l'amour (directed by Jean Stelli) - Maurice Orland
- 1946: Sylvie and the Ghost (directed by Claude Autant-Lara) - Ramure
- 1946: La Tentation de Barbizon (directed by Jean Stelli) - Le diable et Ben Atkinson / The Devil
- 1946: Au petit bonheur (directed by Marcel L'Herbier) - Denis Carignol
- 1946: Un revenant (directed by Christian-Jaque) - François Nisard
- 1947: Le Silence est d'or (directed by René Clair) - Jacques Francet
- 1948: Une jeune fille savait (directed by Maurice Lehmann) - 'Coco' Levaison
- 1948: The Loves of Colette (directed by Jean Faurez) - François Lecoc
- 1948: Woman Without a Past (directed by Gilles Grangier) - Michel
- 1949: Jean de la Lune (directed by Marcel Achard) - Clotaire dit Cloclo - le frère fantasque et envahissant de Marceline
- 1949: Retour à la vie (directed by Georges Lampin) - Antoine (segment 2 : "Le retour d'Antoine")
- 1950: Sorceror (directed by Henri Calef) - Michel Riverain
- 1950: Orphée (directed by Jean Cocteau) - Heurtebise
- 1950: The Little Zouave (directed by Gilles Grangier) - M. Denis
- 1950: Old Boys of Saint-Loup (directed by Georges Lampin) - Charles Merlin
- 1950: Souvenirs perdus (directed by Christian-Jaque) - Jean-Pierre Delagrange (episode "Une couronne mortuaire")
- 1951: L'Affaire Manet (directed by Jean Aurel) (court-métrage) (voice)
- 1951: Sous le ciel de Paris (directed by Julien Duvivier) - Récitant (voice)
- 1951: My Seal and Them (directed by Pierre Billon) - François Verville
- 1952: Love, Madame (directed by Gilles Grangier) - François Célerier
- 1952: She and Me (directed by Guy Lefranc) - Jean Montaigu
- 1953: A Woman's Treasure (directed by Jean Stelli) - François Delaroche
- 1953: Jeunes mariés (directed by Gilles Grangier) - Jacques Delaroche
- 1953: Capitaine Pantoufle (directed by Guy Lefranc) - Emmanuel Bonavent
- 1953: Bonjour Paris (directed by Jean Image) - Narrator (voice)
- 1953: It Happened in the Park (Villa Borghese) (directed by Vittorio De Sica and Gianni Franciolini) - Il professore di greco (segment: Pi-greco)
- 1954: Quelques pas dans la vie (Tempi nostri) (directed by Alessandro Blasetti and Paul Paviot) - Lui
- 1954: Secrets d'alcôve (directed by Jean Delannoy) - Bertrand Germain-Latour (segment "Lit de la Pompadour, Le")
- 1954: Scènes de ménage (directed by André Berthomieu) - Trielle
- 1954: Cadet Rousselle (directed by André Hunebelle) - Cadet Rousselle
- 1955: Stopover in Orly (directed by Jean Dréville) - Pierre Brissac
- 1955: Le Ciel de lit (directed by Marcel L'Herbier) (TV Movie)
- 1955: The Fugitives (directed by Jean-Paul Le Chanois) - François
- 1956: The Man Who Never Was (L'Homme qui n'a jamais existé) (directed by Ronald Neame) - Clerk of British Embassy (uncredited)
- 1956: Gervaise (directed by René Clément) - Henri Coupeau - le second compagnon de Gervaise, un ouvrier zingueur
- 1956: I'll Get Back to Kandara (directed by Victor Vicas) - André Barret
- 1957: Que les hommes sont bêtes (directed by Roger Richebé) - Roland Devert
- 1957: The She-Wolves (directed by Luis Saslavsky) - Gervais Larauch / Bernard Pradal
- 1957: Nights of Cabiria (Le Notti di Cabiria) (directed by Federico Fellini) - Oscar D'Onofrio
- 1957: Anyone Can Kill Me (directed by Henri Decoin) - Paul - le directeur de la prison
- 1957: Charming Boys (directed by Henri Decoin) - Robert
- 1958: La Création du monde (directed by Eduard Hofman) - Récitant / Narrator (voice)
- 1958: La Bigorne (directed by Robert Darène) - La Bigorne
- 1958: Maxime (directed by Henri Verneuil) - Récitant / Narrator (voice, uncredited)
- 1958: L'Américain se détend (directed by François Reichenbach) (court-métrage) - Récitant (voice)
- 1959: Bobosse (directed by Étienne Périer) - Tony Varlet / Bobosse / Les six jurés / Le président du Tribunal / L'avocat général / L'avocat / Le garde
- 1959: Les Affreux (directed by Marc Allégret) - (voice)
- 1959: Il Magistrato (directed by Luigi Zampa) - Luigi Bonelli
- 1960: Le Testament d'Orphée (directed by Jean Cocteau) - Heurtebise (uncredited)
- 1960: Lovers on a Tightrope (directed by Jean-Charles Dudrumet) - Daniel
- 1960: La Française et l'amour (directed by Christian-Jaque) - Michel (segment "Divorce, Le")
- 1960: Jack of Spades (directed by Yves Allégret)
- 1960: Zaa, petit chameau blanc (directed by Jacques Poitrenaud) (court-métrage) - (voice)
- 1961: Les Amours de Paris (directed by Jacques Poitrenaud) - Maurice Lasnier
- 1961: L'Amant de cinq jours (directed by Philippe de Broca) - Georges
- 1961: Réveille-toi chérie (directed by Claude Magnier) - Robert
- 1962: Girl on the Road (directed by Jacqueline Audry) - L'homme de 40 ans
- 1962: Le Crime ne paie pas (directed by Gérard Oury) - Récitant / Narrator (voice)
- 1962: Mandrin (directed by Jean-Paul Le Chanois) - Narrator (voice, uncredited)
- 1963: The Bamboo Stroke (directed by Jean Boyer) - Léon Brissac
- 1963: Les Veinards (directed by Jean Girault) - Jérôme Boisselier (segment "Le manteau de vison")
- 1963: Dragées au poivre (directed by Jacques Baratier) - Legrand (le nounou 1)
- 1963: Les Camarades (I Compagni) (directed by Mario Monicelli) - Maestro Di Meo
- 1963: La Visita (directed by Antonio Pietrangeli) - Adolfo Di Palma
- 1964: Week-end à Zuydcoote (directed by Henri Verneuil) - Alexandre
- 1967: Un homme de trop (directed by Costa-Gavras) - Moujon
- 1967: Le Samouraï (directed by Jean-Pierre Melville) - Le Commissaire
- 1969: Z (directed by Costa-Gavras) - Le procureur
- 1968: Les Gauloises bleues (directed by Michel Cournot) - Le juge
- 1970: Les Caprices de Marie (directed by Philippe de Broca) - Jean-Jules de Lépine
- 1970: Le Cercle rouge (directed by Jean-Pierre Melville) - Santi
- 1970: Tumuc Humac (directed by Jean-Marie Périer) - Le juge
- 1971: Max et les ferrailleurs (directed by Claude Sautet) - Rosinsky
- 1971: Juste avant la nuit (directed by Claude Chabrol) - François Tellier
- 1972: La Nuit Bulgare (directed by Michel Mitrani) - Lafond
- 1972: L'Attentat (directed by Yves Boisset) - Le commissaire René Rouannat - un flic honnête
- 1973: Témoignages (directed by Jean-Marie Périer) (TV series) - Lui
- 1973: Nous voulons les colonels (directed by Mario Monicelli) - Onorevole Luigi Di Cori
- 1974: Antoine and Sebastian (directed by Jean-Marie Périer) - Antoine
- 1974: Stavisky... (directed by Alain Resnais) - Albert Borelli
- 1975: Sara (directed by Marcel Bluwal) (TV movie) - Restif de la Bretonne
- 1975: Docteur Françoise Gailland (directed by Jean-Louis Bertucelli) - Gérard Gailland
- 1976: Police Python 357 (directed by Alain Corneau) - Commissaire Ganay
- 1977: Baxter, Vera Baxter (directed by Marguerite Duras) - Jean Baxter (voice)
- 1978: La Raison d'état (directed by André Cayatte) - le professeur Marrot
- 1978: Mazarin (directed by Pierre Cardinal) (TV miniseries) - Mazarin
- 1979: The Police War (directed by Robin Davis) - Colombani
- 1980: Le Bar du téléphone (directed by Claude Barrois) - Commissaire Claude Joinville
- 1983: Le Battant (directed by Robin Davis and Alain Delon) - Gino Ruggieri
- 1983: Thérèse Humbert (directed by Marcel Bluwal) (TV movie) - Me Dumort
- 1984: La piovra (directed by Damiano Damiani (TV miniseries) - Avvocato Terrasini
- 1984: Le Tartuffe (directed by Gérard Depardieu) - Orgon
- 1984: Jacques le fataliste et son maître (directed by Claude Santelli) (TV movie) - Denis Diderot
- 1985: La piovra, season 2 (directed by Florestano Vancini) (TV miniseries) - Avvocato Terrasini
- 1987: La piovra, season 3 (directed by Luigi Perelli) (TV miniseries) - Avvocato Terrasini
- 1987: Soigne ta droite (directed by Jean-Luc Godard) - L'homme
- 1990-1991: Le Gorille (directed by Jean Delannoy) (TV series) - Berthomieu / Berthomieu, dit 'Le vieux' / Le Vieux
- 1990: Lacenaire (directed by Francis Girod) - Le père de Lacenaire
- 1991: Madame Bovary (directed by Claude Chabrol) - Récitant / Narrator (voice)
- 1991: La Pagaille (directed by Pascal Thomas) - Gabriel
- 1992: Voyage à Rome (directed by Michel Lengliney) - Le père
- 1996: Mémoires d'un jeune con (directed by Patrick Aurignac) - Le père de Frédéric
