= Jean-Jacques Grunenwald =

French organist (1911–1982)

- Born: 2 February 1911
- Died: 19 December 1982 (aged 71)
- Occupations: Organist, Composer, Architect, and Pedagogue

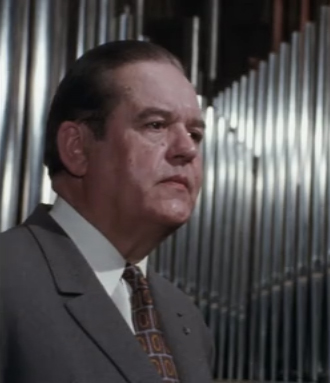
Grunenwald at Studio 104 of Maison de la Radio (1974)

Jean-Jacques Charles Grunenwald, also known by his pseudonym Jean Dalve (2 February 1911 – 19 December 1982), was a French organist, composer, architect, and pedagogue.

== Life and work ==
Grunenwald was born in 1911 in Cran-Gevrier (now part of Annecy), Haute-Savoie. He studied at the Paris Conservatory, where he received first prizes in organ (1935, class of Marcel Dupré) and composition (1937, class of Henri Busser). Two years later, Grunenwald won the prestigious Second Grand Prix de Rome for his cantata, La farce du Mari fondu. Additionally to his musical education, Grunenwald was enrolled at the École National des Beaux-Arts in Paris, where he graduated in 1941 with a diploma in architecture.

In 1955, Grunenwald became organist at St-Pierre-de-Montrouge in Paris. Two years later, he began a recording of the complete organ works of J. S. Bach on 24 LPs, which he completed in 1962. This recording was made at Soissons Cathedral with its Gonzales organ.

From 1957 to 1961, he was professor of organ at the Schola Cantorum in Paris and from 1961 to 1966 an organ teacher at the Conservatoire de musique de Genève. Among his students were Jean-Pierre Decavèle, Raffi Ourgandijan, and Louis Robilliard.

In January 1973, Grunenwald succeeded his former teacher, Marcel Dupré, as titular organist at St. Sulpice in Paris. He held this post until his death in 1982 at age 71.

As an internationally acknowledged concert organist, he played more than 1,500 recitals worldwide.

His catalog of compositions contains numerous organ and piano works, chamber music, orchestral works, oratorios, as well as music written for several films, such as Monsieur Vincent (1947).

He was married to Sonia Appel (1913–2011) until his death in the 7th arrondissement of Paris at the age of 71 on 19 December 1982. He, along with other members of his family, are buried in the Appel-Fourgeaud-Virenique-Grunenwald vault in the Père Lachaise Cemetery.

== Compositions ==
=== Organ Solo ===
- Première Suite (1937)
- Deuxième Suite (1938)
- Berceuse (1939)
- Quatre Élevations (1939)
- Hymne aux Mémoires héroïques (1939)
- Hymne à la Splendeur des Clartés (1940)
- Variations brèves sur un Noël du XVIe Siècle Je me suis levé (1949)
- Cinq Pièces pour l'Office Divin (1952)
- Fugue sur les jeux d'anches (1954)
- Diptyque liturgique (1956)
- Hommage à Josquin des Près (1956)
- Introduction et aria (1956)
- Messe du Très Saint Sacrement (1960)
- Adoratio (1964)
- Sonate (1964)
- Pièce en Mosaïque (Contrastes) (1966)
- Pastorale mystique (1968)
- Oppositions (1976)
- Postlude alleluiatique (1977)

=== Piano Solo ===
- Prélude (1936)
- La melodie intérieure (1944)
- Fantasmagorie (Scherzo) (1946)
- Cahier pour Gérard: cinq pièces (1948)
- Capriccio pour piano... (1958)
- Partita (1971)

=== Piano and Orchestra ===
- Concerto (1940)
- Concert d'été for piano and string orchestra (1944)

=== Orchestra ===
- Fêtes de la lumière (1937)
- Ouverture pour un drame sacré (1954)

=== Miscellaneous works ===
- Suite de danses for harpsichord or piano (1948)
- Fantaisie-arabesque for harpsichord (or piano), oboe, clarinet in A and bassoon(1950)
- Sardanapale: drame lyrique en trois actes (1950)
- Variations sur un thème de Machaut for harpsichord (1957)
- Henry Barraud (1900–1997): Te Deum for orchestra, transcription for choirs and organ by Jean-Jacques Grunenwald (1957)
- Psaume CXXIX (De profundis) for mixed choir and orchestra (1961)
- Tu es Petrus for choir and two organs (1965)
- Fantaisie en dialogue for organ and orchestra (1965)
- Sonate de concert for trumpet and string orchestra or trumpet and organ (1967)

=== Film music ===
- Les Anges du Péché (1943, directed by Robert Bresson)
- Paris Frills (1945, directed by Jacques Becker)
- Les Dames du Bois de Boulogne (1945, directed by Robert Bresson)
- Dernier refuge (1947, directed by Marc Maurette)
- Antoine and Antoinette (1947, directed by Jacques Becker)
- Monsieur Vincent (1947, directed by Maurice Cloche)
- Doctor Laennec (1949, directed by Maurice Cloche)
- La Route inconnue (1949, directed by Léon Poirier)
- Le Journal d'un curé de campagne (1951, directed by Robert Bresson)
- Edward and Caroline (1951, directed by Jacques Becker)
- La Vérité sur Bébé Donge (1952, directed by Henri Decoin)
- La Demoiselle et son revenant (1952, directed by Marc Allégret)
- Mina de Vanghel (1953, directed by Maurice Barry and Maurice Clavel)
- L'Étrange désir de Monsieur Bard (1953, directed by Géza von Radványi)
- Lovers of Toledo (1953, directed by Henri Decoin and Fernando Palacios)
- Le Rideau cramoisi (1953, directed by Alexandre Astruc)
- Navigation marchande atlantique (1954, directed by Georges Franju)
- Le Chevalier de la nuit (1954, directed by Robert Darène)
- Le Défroqué (1954, directed by Léo Joannon)
- L'Homme aux clefs d'or (1956, directed by Léo Joannon)
- S.O.S. Noronha (1957, directed by Georges Rouquier)
- Les Aventures d'Arsène Lupin (1957, directed by Jacques Becker)
- À cause, à cause d'une femme (1963, directed by Michel Deville)

Preceded by Marcel Dupre	Titular Organist, Saint Sulpice Paris; 1973–1982	Succeeded by Daniel Roth

== Bibliography ==
- "Jean-Jacques Grunenwald: organiste, compositeur, architecte." In: L'Orgue: Cahiers et memoirs No. 36 (1986). Paris, France: Association des Amis de l'Orgue, 1986.
- Darasse, Xavier: "Jean-Jacques Grunenwald", in Guide de la musique d’orgue, edited by Gilles Cantagrel. Paris, Fayard, 1991: 417–419.
- Machabey, A.: Portraits de trente musiciens français. Paris, 1949: 93–96.
- Serret, Gérard (ed.). Jean-Jacques Grunenwald. Paris, France: G. Serret, 1984.
