= Andrée Feix =

French film editor and director

- Born: 15 February 1912; Paris, France
- Died: 15 April 1987 (aged 75)
- Occupations: Editor, Director
- Years active: 1933–1979 (film)

Andrée Feix (15 February 1912 – 15 April 1987) was a French film editor and film director. She directed two films in the mid-1940s, making her debut with the comedy Once is Enough (1946).

== Selected filmography ==
=== Editor ===
- The House of Mystery (1933)
- Little Jacques (1934)
- The Voyage to America (1951)
- Koenigsmark (1953)
- Yours Truly, Blake (1954)
- Black Orpheus (1959)
- Love in the Night (1968)

=== Director ===
- Once is Enough (1946)
- Captain Blomet (1947)

== Bibliography ==
- Brigitte Rollet. Coline Serreau. Manchester University Press, 1998. ISBN 978-0-7190-5088-6.
