= Woman Without a Past (1948 film) =

1948 film

- Directed by: Gilles Grangier
- Written by: Jean Guitton; Marc-Gilbert Sauvajon
- Produced by: Claude Dolbert
- Starring: François Périer; Sophie Desmarets; Alfred Adam
- Cinematography: René Colas
- Edited by: Pierre Delannoy
- Music by: Vincent Scotto
- Production company: Codo-Cinema
- Distributed by: Les Films Corona
- Release date: 27 August 1948
- Running time: 95 minutes
- Country: France
- Language: French

Woman Without a Past (French: Femme sans passé) is a 1948 French comedy film directed by Gilles Grangier and starring François Périer, Sophie Desmarets and Alfred Adam.

The film's sets were designed by the art director Raymond Druart.

== Cast ==
- François Périer as Michel
- Sophie Desmarets as Caroline
- Alfred Adam as Pierre Lorin
- Abel Jacquin as Demaison
- Margo Lion as Mlle Marcelle
- Hélène Pépée as La folle
- Maurice Teynac as Chimerowitz
- René Stern as Le majordome
- Sylvain as Le domestique

== Bibliography ==
- Bessy, Maurice & Chirat, Raymond. Histoire du cinéma français: encyclopédie des films, 1940–1950. Pygmalion, 1986
