= Françoise Giroud =

French journalist, writer, and politician (1916–2003)

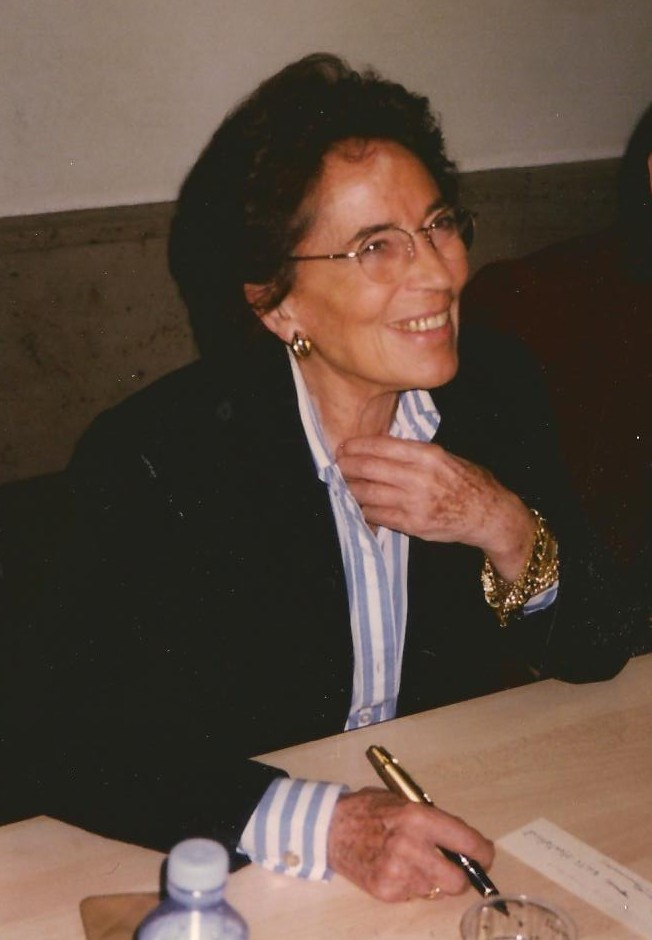
- Giroud in 1998

Minister of Culture
- In office 24 August 1976 – 30 March 1977
- President: Valéry Giscard d'Estaing
- Prime Minister: Raymond Barre
- Preceded by: Michel Guy
- Succeeded by: Michel d'Ornano

Secretary of State for women's rights
- In office 1974–1976
- President: Valéry Giscard d'Estaing
- Prime Minister: Jacques Chirac
- Succeeded by: Monique Pelletier

Personal details
- Born: Lea France Gourdji; 21 September 1916 Lausanne, Switzerland
- Died: 19 January 2003 (aged 86) Neuilly-sur-Seine, Ile-de-France, France
- Party: Union for French Democracy
- Children: 1 son and daughter
- Profession: Journalist

Françoise Giroud, born Lea France Gourdji (French: [fʁɑ̃swaz ʒiʁu]; 21 September 1916 – 19 January 2003), was a French journalist, screenwriter, writer, and politician.

== Early and personal life ==
Giroud was born in Lausanne, Switzerland, to immigrant Sephardi Turkish Jewish parents; her father was Salih Gourdji Al Baghdadi, Director of the Agence Télégraphique Ottomane in Geneva. She was educated at the Collège de Groslay and the Lycée Molière in Paris. She did not graduate from university. She married and had two children, a son (who died before her) and a daughter.

== Career ==
Giroud's work in cinema began with director Marc Allégret as a script-girl on his 1932 adaptation of Marcel Pagnol's play Fanny. In 1936, she worked with Jean Renoir on the set of Grand Illusion. She later wrote screenplays, 30 books (both fiction and non-fiction), and wrote newspaper columns. She was the editor of Elle magazine from 1946 (shortly after it was founded) until 1953, when she and her then-partner Jean-Jacques Servan-Schreiber founded the newsmagazine L'Express. She edited L'Express until 1971, then was its director until 1974, when she began her political career.

== Political career ==
In 1974, President Valéry Giscard d'Estaing nominated Giroud to the position of Secretary of State for women's rights, which she held from 16 July 1974 until 27 August 1976, when she was appointed to the position of Minister of Culture. She remained in that position until March 1977, for a total service of 32 months, serving in the cabinets of prime ministers Jacques Chirac and Raymond Barre. She was a member of the centrist Radical Party.

Giroud often said that her goal was to get France "out of its rut", contrasting France with the dynamism and optimism she saw in the United States. On her first visit to New York City soon after World War 2 ended, she had been struck by "the degree of optimism, the exhilaration" she had found there. That view stayed with her: "There is a strength in the United States that we in Europe constantly tend to underestimate." Giroud gave the commencement address at the University of Michigan on 1 May 1976.

== Later activities ==
Giroud received the Légion d'honneur. She led Action Against Hunger, a humanitarian aid organization, from 1984 to 1988.

From 1989 to 1991, she was president of a commission to improve cinema-ticket sales. She was a literary critic for the weekly Le Journal du Dimanche, and she contributed a weekly column to Le Nouvel Observateur from 1983 until her death.

Giroud died at the American Hospital of Paris on 21 September 2003 while being treated for a head wound incurred in a fall. A special issue of L'Express covered Giroud's death. It stated:

Women everywhere have lost something. Ms. Giroud defended them so intelligently and so strongly.

== Published works ==
- Françoise Giroud vous présente le Tout-Paris (1953)
- Nouveaux portraits (1954)
- La Nouvelle vague: portraits de la jeunesse (1958)
- I Give You my Word (1973)
- La comédie du pouvoir (1977)
- Ce que je crois (1978)
- Le Bon Plaisir (1983)
- Une Femme honorable (1981) (published in English as Marie Curie: A Life (1986))
- Le Bon Plaisir (screenplay) (1984)
- Dior (1987)
- Alma Mahler, ou l'art d'être aimée (1988)
- Leçons particulières (ISBN 978-2-213-02598-8, 1990)
- Marie Curie, une Femme honorable (television series) (1991)
- Jenny Marx ou le femme du diable (1992)
- Les Hommes et les femmes (with Bernard-Henri Lévy, 1993).
- Journal d'une Parisienne (1994)
- La rumeur du monde: journal, 1997 et 1998 (1999)
- On ne peut pas être heureux tout le temps: récit (2000)
- C'est arrivé hier: journal 1999 (2000)
- Profession journaliste: conversations avec Martine de Rabaudy (2001)
- Demain, déjà: journal, 2000-2003 (2003)

== Filmography ==
- Promise to a Stranger (1942)
- Fantômas (1946)
- The Angel They Gave Me (1946)
- Last Love (1949)
- The Little Cardinals (1951)
- Love, Madame (1952)
- A Girl on the Road (1952)
- A Woman's Treasure (1953)
- Le Bon Plaisir (1984)

== See also ==
- L'Amour, Madame (1952, film)
- Julietta (1953, film)
