= Jean-Marie Périer =

French photographer and film director (born 1940)

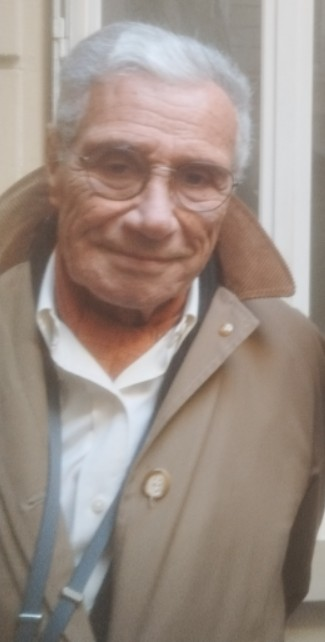
- Périer in 2026
- Born: Jean-Marie Pillu; 1 February 1940 (age 86); Neuilly-sur-Seine, France
- Occupation: Photographer
- Children: 3
- Parent(s): François Périer (adoptive father); Jacqueline Porel (mother); Henri Salvador (biological father)
- Relatives: Marc Porel (half-brother); Anne-Marie Périer (half-sister); Gabrielle Réjane (great-grandmother); Paul Porel (great-grandfather)

Jean-Marie Périer (French pronunciation: [ʒɑ̃ maʁi peʁje]; born 1 February 1940) is a French photographer and film director.

On 22 June 1963, the magazine Salut les copains organised a concert on Place de la Nation in Paris, with singers such as Johnny Hallyday, Richard Anthony, Eddy Mitchell and Frank Alamo. It attracted over 150,000 young people. The following day, the Paris-Presse headline read "Salut les voyous!" The concert photographer and friend of many singers was Jean-Marie Périer.

== Filmography ==
- 1970 : Tumuc Humac, a film taking place in the Tumuk Humak Mountains, with Marc Porel, Dani, François Périer and André Pousse
- 1973 : Antoine et Sébastien, with Jacques Dutronc and Keith Carradine as John
- 1973 : Témoignages (TV series) (episode : Un monstre), with François Périer
- 1978 : Dirty Dreamer, with Jacques Dutronc and Lea Massari
- 1980 : Téléphone public (screened out of competition at the 1980 Cannes Film Festival)
- 1985 : Love & Happiness, David Sanborn live with Marcus Miller, Don Grolnick, Hiram Bullock, Buddy Williams and Hamish Stuart.
- 2007 : Catching Salinger, a documentary featuring writer Frederic Beigbeder.

== Exhibitions ==
- 2022 : Jean-Marie Périer. El fotógrafo de las estrellas, Málaga, Centro Cultural La Malagueta Galerie Photo12
- 2014 : Rolling Stones revealed, Paris, Galerie Photo12
- 2013 : Rock'n Roll, Paris, Galerie Polka
- 2013 : Pour ceux qui aiment le Jazz, Paris, Galerie Photo12
- 2011 : Françoise, Paris, Galerie Photo12
- 2010 : Sixties, Mégève, Galerie Pierre Mahaux
- 2010 : Fashion, Los Angeles, Galerie Polka
- 2009 : Scopitone, les années de légende, Paris, Galerie Photo12
