= Maurice Cloche =

French filmmaker (1907–1990)

Maurice Cloche (17 June 1907, in Commercy, Meuse – 20 March 1990, in Bordeaux, France) was a French film director, screenwriter, photographer and film producer. Best known for his Oscar-winning film Monsieur Vincent (1947) he won a 1948 Special Academy Award for Best Foreign Language Film.

''Monsieur Vincent,'' a dramatization of the life of St. Vincent de Paul that starred Pierre Fresnay, won the Academy Award in 1947 for best foreign film. It also was honored as the best film in France that year.

== Career ==
Mr. Cloche, whose career spanned more than a half-century, also made spy thrillers and films with religious and social themes.

His best-known films include ''La Cage aux Oiseaux'' (''The Bird Cage''); ''Le Docteur Laennec,'' the story of the inventor of the stethoscope; ''Ne de Pere Inconnu'' (''Father Unknown'') and ''La Cage aux Filles (''The Girl Cage'').

In 1940, Mr. Cloche founded a film society for young talent. It later became France's leading film school, the Institute of Advanced Film Studies.

He studied at the École des Beaux-Arts, then at the École nationale supérieure des arts décoratifs, before going to the cinema as an actor in 1933. He became artistic director and became director by shooting several short films. He created a production company and made his first feature film in 1937. After the Second World War, he is best known as a writer of films about great figures of Christian charity, hence his reputation in the profession of official Catholic filmmaker.

He does not neglect the social subjects, nor even the series B. Maurice Cloche also realizes several documentaries on art: Terre d'amour, Symphonie graphique, Alsace, Franche-Comté, Gothic images. In 1940, in the southern zone, he participated with Paul Legros (general director) and Pierre Gérin (deputy director), at the founding of the artistic and technical center of the young people of the cinema of which he ensures the artistic direction. 2009, Hôtel de Sully, National Gallery of the Jeu de Paume (collective exhibition).

He died on 20 March 1990, at his home in Bordeaux after a long illness. He was 82 years old and had Parkinson's disease.

== Selected filmography ==
- Cease Firing (1934)
- The Ladies in the Green Hats (1937)
- The Little Thing (1938)
- Girl with Grey Eyes (1945)
- The Eleventh Hour Guest (1945)
- Rooster Heart (1946)
- Women's Games (1946)
- Cage of Girls (1949)
- Doctor Laennec (1949)
- The Bread Peddler (1950)
- Domenica (1952)
- The Sparrows of Paris (1953)
- A Missionary (1955)
- Girls of the Night (1958)
- Women's Prison (1958)
- Cocagne (1961)
- The Bread Peddler (1963)
- Agent X-77 Orders to Kill (1966)
- The Viscount (1967)
- The Killer Likes Candy (1968)
