= List of Lui cover models =

This list of Lui cover models (1963–1987; 1987–1994; 1995–1997; 2001–2007; 2013–2020; 2026–present) is a catalog of cover models who have appeared on the cover of Lui, a French adult entertainment magazine. From 1995 to 1997 the magazine was named Le Nouveau Lui.

== 1960s ==
=== 1963 ===
Issue	Cover model	Photographer	Ref.
November (№1)	Valérie Lagrange		

=== 1964 ===
Issue	Cover model	Photographer	Ref.
January (№2)			
February (№3)	Brigitte Bardot		
March			
April (№5)			
May			
June			
July			
August			
September			
October			
November			
December			

=== 1965 ===
Issue	Cover model	Photographer	Ref.
January			
February			
March			
April (№16)			
May (№17)			
June (№18)			
July			
August			
September (№21)	Raquel Welch		
October			
November (№23)			
December			

=== 1966 ===
Issue	Cover model	Photographer	Ref.
January			
February (№26)	Jocelyn Lane		
March (№27)	Raquel Welch		
April			
May (№29)	Isabelle de Funès	Frank Gitty	
June (№30)			
July (№31)	Ursula Andress		
August			
September			
October (№34)	Anny Duperey	Frank Gitty	
November (№35)	Alexandra Stewart		
December (№36)			

=== 1967 ===
Issue	Cover model	Photographer	Ref.
January			
February (№38)	Alexandra Stewart	Frank Gitty	
March (№39)			
April	Brigitte Bardot		
May			
June (№42)	Antonella Lualdi	Ned Kelly	
July (№43)	Jocelyn Lane		
August			
September			
October (№46)		Frank Gitty	
November			
December (№48)	Anny Duperey		

=== 1968 ===
Issue	Cover model	Photographer	Ref.
January			
February (№50)		Frank Gitty	
March			
April			
May			
June			
July			
August/September (№56)	Jill, Elisabeth	Frank Gitty	
October			
November			
December (№59)	Mireille Darc		

=== 1969 ===
Issue	Cover model	Photographer	Ref.
January (№60)	Brigitte Bardot		
February (№61)	Jane Birkin	Michel Holsnyder	
March			
April			
May			
June			
July			
August			
September (№68)	Brigitte Bardot		
October			
November			
December (№71)	Jane Birkin		

== 1970s ==
=== 1970 ===
Issue	Cover model	Photographer	Ref.
January			
February			
March			
April (№75)		Frank Gitty	
May (№76)		Frank Gitty	
June			
July (№78)			
August (№79)		Frank Gitty	
September			
October			
November (№82)	Patti D'Arbanville	Frank Gitty	
December (№83)		Francis Giacobetti	

=== 1971 ===
Issue	Cover model	Photographer	Ref.
January			
February (№85)		Frank Gitty	
March			
April (№87)		Raymond Depardon	
May			
June (№89)		Frank Gitty	
July			
August			
September			
October			
November			
December (№95)		Faroum Gorgoulof	

=== 1972 ===
Issue	Cover model	Photographer	Ref.
January			
February (№97)			
March (№98)		Frank Gitty	
April (№99)			
May (№100)	Marlène Jobert	Jean-Pierre Bonnotte	
June (№101)		Frank Gitty	
July (№102)		Frank Gitty	
August			
September (№104)		Max Danton	
October			
November			
December (№107)	Brigitte Bardot, Jane Birkin	Gamma	

=== 1973 ===
Issue	Cover model	Photographer/Illustrator	Ref.
January			
February			
March (№110)	Brigitte Bardot (Marianne)	Aslan	
April (№111)		Francis Giacobetti	
May (№112)		Sacha Van Dorsen	
June			
July			
August			
September			
October			
November			
December			

=== 1974 ===
Issue	Cover model	Photographer	Ref.
January			
February			
March			
April			
May (№124)	Sydne Rome	Emilio Lari	
June (№125)			
July (№126)	Brigitte	André Valmont	
August			
September			
October			
November			
December (№131)	Jane Birkin	Frank Gitty	

=== 1975 ===
Issue	Cover model	Photographer	Ref.
January (№132)		Akimichi Maekawa	
February			
March (№134)	Sylvia Kristel	Francis Giacobetti	
April			
May			
June			
July			
August			
September (№140)		Silverstein	
October (№141)		Marc Robin	
November (№142)			
December			

=== 1976 ===
Issue	Cover model	Photographer	Ref.
January (№144)	Ursula Andress		
February (№145)			
March (№146)			
April			
May			
June			
July			
August			
September (№152)	uncredited, Robert Redford		
October			
November			
December (№156)			

=== 1977 ===
Issue	Cover model	Photographer	Ref.
January			
February			
March			
April			
May			
June			
July			
August			
September			
October (№165)			
November (№166)	Jennifer Lanvin	Francis Giacobetti	
December			

=== 1978 ===
Issue	Cover model	Photographer	Ref.
January (№169)		Francis Giacobetti	
February		Frank Gitty	
March			
April (№171)	Nina Carter, Jilly Johnson		
May (№172)			
June (№173)			
July			
August (№175)	Odile Michel		
September			
October			
November (№178)	Michel Sardou, uncredited		
December			

=== 1979 ===
Issue	Cover model	Photographer	Ref.
January			
February			
March			
April (№183)	Herma Vos		
May			
June			
July (№186)		Frank Gitty	
August			
September		Frank Gitty	
October			
November			
December			

== 1980s ==
=== 1980 ===
Issue	Cover model	Photographer	Ref.
January			
February (№191)	Bernadette Lafont		
March			
April			
May			
June (№195)	Nastassja Kinski		
July (№196)	Bo Deeck		
August			
September		Frank Gitty	
October (№201)		James Baes	
November (№202)		Francis Giacobetti	
December (№203)	Anicée Alvina		

=== 1981 ===
Issue	Cover model	Photographer	Ref.
January			
February			
March (№206)	Clio Goldsmith	Sygma	
April (№207)			
May (№208)	Véronique Genest		
June (№209)			
July (№210)	Sylvia Kristel		
August (№211)			
September (№212)	Yanet Cuevas, Johanna Perkins, Lise Thorensen	Francis Giacobetti	
October (№213)			
November (№214)			
December (№215)	Isabelle Huppert		

=== 1982 ===
Issue	Cover model	Photographer	Ref.
January (№216)			
February (№217)	Bambou	Serge Gainsbourg	
March (№218)	Mireille Darc, uncredited		
April			
May			
June (№222)			
July			
August			
September			
October (№225)	Sophia Loren	Frank Gitty	
November			
December			

=== 1983 ===
Issue	Cover model	Photographer	Ref.
January			
February (№229)			
March			
April (№231)	Anne Parillaud	Michel Ginfray	
May (№232)			
June (№233)	Pauline Lafont		
July			
August (№235)	Valérie Kaprisky	Raoul Ahoup	
September			
October			
November (№238)			
December (№239)			

=== 1984 ===
Issue	Cover model	Photographer	Ref.
January (№240)			
February (№241)	Tawny Kitaen	Just Jaeckin	
March			
April			
May			
June			
July (№246)			
August (№247)		Elvis Conti	
September (№248)			
October (№249)			
November			
December			

=== 1985 ===
Issue	Cover model	Photographer	Ref.
January			
February			
March (№254)	Florence Guérin		
April			
May			
June (№257)		Fabio Berti	
July			
August			
September (№260)			
October			
November			
December (№263)			

=== 1986 ===
Issue	Cover model	Photographer	Ref.
January			
February			
March (№266)	uncredited, Anthony Delon	Gerhard Vormwald	
April			
May (№268)	Amanda Lear		
June (№269)			
July			
August			
September			
October (№273)	Monique Gabrielle		
November (№274)	Sophie Favier, Fiona Gélin		
December			

=== 1987 ===
Issue	Cover model	Photographer	Ref.
January		Denys de Francesco	
February (№277)		Jean-Pierre Bourgeois	
April (№278)	Brigitte Lahaie	Frank Gitty	
May (№279)	Elsa	Roberto Rocchi	
(№280)			
(№281)	Melissa	Byron Newman	
№282	Mandy Smith	John Kelly	
August (№283)	Olivia Dutron	Michel Moreau	
September (№284)	Jeane Manson	Giacobetti	
October (№285)			
November (#1)			
#2	Geraldine Danon		

=== 1988 ===
Issue	Cover model	Photographer	Ref.
February (#4)	Danièle Gilbert		
March (#5)			
April (#6)	Sabrina Salerno		
May (#7)	Natalie Uher		
#8			
July (#9)	Catherine Carew	Jean-Pierre Bourgeois	
#10	Florence Guérin, uncredited		
September (#11)			
October (#12)		Frank Gitty	
November (#13)			
#14	Lio	Guy Bourdin	

=== 1989 ===
Issue	Cover model	Photographer	Ref.
January (#15)	Allegra		
February (#16)		Byron Newman	
March (#17)			
April (#18)			
May (#19)			
June			
July (#21)			
August			
September (#23)	Tully Jensen		
October (#24)			
November (#25)	Kim	Bruno Bisang	
December (#26)			

== 1990s ==
=== 1990 ===
Issue	Cover model	Photographer	Ref.
January (#27)			
February			
March (#29)			
#30			
May (#31)	Julie Piétri		
June (#32)	Lisa Sliwa		
July (#33)	Madonna	Herb Ritts	
August (#34)	Caroline Barclay	Denis Malerbi	
September (#35)	Arielle Dombasle	Studio Harcourt	
October (#36)	Léonor Scherrer	Rick Dinome	
November (#37)	Kim Andrea	Klaus Roethlisberger	
December	Stacey Williams		

=== 1991 ===
Issue	Cover model	Photographer/Illustrator	Ref.
January (#39)		Gilles Voisin	
February (#40)			
March (#41)	Brigitte Nielsen		
April			
May (#43)			
June (#44)	Anne Sinclair	Melki	
July	Marlène		
August (#46)			
September (#47)			
October (#48)		John Rutter	
November (#49)			
December (#50)	Francesca Dellera		

=== 1992 ===
Issue	Cover model	Photographer	Ref.
January (#51)			
February (#52)			
March			
April	Madonna	Adam Christopher	
May (#55)	Moana Pozzi		
June (#56)		André Rivale	
July/August (#57)	Isabelle Pasco	Ronald Siemoneit	
September			
October (#59)			
November			
December/January 1993	Madonna		

=== 1993 ===
Issue	Cover model	Photographer	Ref.
February/March (#62)	François Mitterrand	Maurice Smith	
April/May (#63)	Naomi Campbell	Brad Fierce	
July/August (#64)	Elle Macpherson		
September/October	Anna Nicole Smith		
December/January 1994 (#67)	Kate Moss		

=== 1994 ===
Issue	Cover model	Photographer	Ref.
May/June (#69)		Jean-Pierre Bourgeois	

=== 1995 ===
Issue	Cover model	Photographer	Ref.
October	Mademoiselle Agnès		
November	Alexandra Kabi		
December	Victoria Silvstedt		

=== 1996 ===
Issue	Cover model	Photographer	Ref.
February	Elizabeth Berkley		
March	Anna Falchi		
April	Gena Lee Nolin		
May	Caroline Barclay		
June	Shauna Sand		
July/August	Carré Otis		
September	Mick Jagger		
October	Tom Cruise		
November	Johnny Hallyday	Roberto Frankenberg	
December/January 1997	Drew Barrymore		

=== 1997 ===
Issue	Cover model	Photographer	Ref.
February	Eva Herzigová		

== 2000s ==
=== 2003 ===
Issue	Cover model	Photographer	Ref.
#23	Claudia		

=== 2004 ===
Issue	Cover model	Photographer	Ref.
#26	Victoria Silvstedt		

== 2010s ==
=== 2013 ===
Issue	Cover model	Photographer	Ref.
October	Léa Seydoux	Mario Sorrenti	
November	Georgia May Jagger	Terry Richardson	
December/January 2014	Edita Vilkevičiūtė	Mikael Jansson	

=== 2014 ===
Issue	Cover model	Photographer	Ref.
February	Małgosia Bela	Mark Segal	
March	Kate Moss	Terry Richardson	
April	Anja Rubik	Mario Sorrenti	
May	Rihanna	Mario Sorrenti	
June	Gisele Bündchen	Mert & Marcus	
July/August	Emily DiDonato	Mark Segal	
July/August	Isabeli Fontana	Mark Segal	
July/August	Karmen Pedaru	Mark Segal	
July/August	Magdalena Frąckowiak	Mark Segal	
September	Fanny François	Olivier Zahm	
October	Małgosia Bela	Katja Rahlwes	
November	Alessandra Ambrosio	Liz Collins	
December/January 2015	Laetitia Casta	Mario Sorrenti	

=== 2015 ===
Issue	Cover model	Photographer	Ref.
February	Marie Gillain	Mark Segal	
March	Natasha Poly	Luigi & Iango	
April	Virginie Ledoyen	Terry Richardson	
May	Camille Rowe	Luigi & Iango	
June	Rosie Huntington-Whiteley	Luigi & Iango	
July/August	Marie de Villepin	Cedric Buchet	
September	Candice Swanepoel	Luigi & Iango	
September	Joan Smalls	Luigi & Iango	
October	Naomi Campbell	Luigi & Iango	
November	Monica Bellucci	Rankin	
December/January 2016	Amber Valletta	Luigi & Iango	
December/January 2016	Anja Rubik	Luigi & Iango	
December/January 2016	Carolyn Murphy	Luigi & Iango	
December/January 2016	Daria Strokous	Luigi & Iango	
December/January 2016	Edita Vilkevičiūtė	Luigi & Iango	
December/January 2016	Isabeli Fontana	Luigi & Iango	
December/January 2016	Jourdan Dunn	Luigi & Iango	
December/January 2016	Lara Stone	Luigi & Iango	
December/January 2016	Małgosia Bela	Luigi & Iango	
December/January 2016	Mariacarla Boscono	Luigi & Iango	
December/January 2016	Natasha Poly	Luigi & Iango	
December/January 2016	Toni Garrn	Luigi & Iango	

=== 2016 ===
Issue	Cover model	Photographer	Ref.
February	Rita Ora	Terry Richardson	
March	Lily Aldridge	David Bellemere	
April	Marie-Ange Casta	Leila Smara	
May	Élodie Frégé	David Bellemere	
June	Audrey Fleurot	Mark Seliger	
July/August	Laeticia Hallyday	David Bellemere	
September	Fernanda Liz	Fe Pinheiro	
September	Isabeli Fontana	Eduardo Rezende	
September	Lais Ribeiro	David Bellemere	
October	Constance Jablonski	David Bellemere	
November	Pauline Lefèvre	Michel Sedan	
December/January 2017	Anais Mali	David Bellemere	
December/January 2017	Barbara Palvin	David Bellemere	
December/January 2017	Elsa Hosk	David Bellemere	
December/January 2017	Hilary Rhoda	David Bellemere	

=== 2017 ===
Issue	Cover model	Photographer	Ref.
February	Kamila Hansen	Fe Pinheiro	
March	Hailey Baldwin	Pierre-Ange Carlotti	
March	Flávia Lucini, Samantha Gradoville	David Bellemere	
Summer	Ana Girardot	Pierre-Ange Carlotti	
Autumn	Sara Sampaio	David Bellemere	
Winter 2017/2018	Jasmine Sanders	Michael Schwartz	

=== 2018 ===
Issue	Cover model	Photographer	Ref.
Spring	Eva Herzigová	Sølve Sundsbø	
Summer	Tina Kunakey	Michel Sedan	
Autumn	Clara Berry	Michel Sedan	
Winter 2018/2019	Marilhéa Peillard	Fred Meylan	

=== 2019 ===
Issue	Cover model	Photographer	Ref.
Spring	Amber Valletta	Chris Colls	
Summer	Anna de Rijk	Chris Colls	
Autumn	Sylvia Hoeks	Chris Colls	
Winter 2019/2020	Lena Simonne	Lucian Bor	

== 2020s ==
=== 2020 ===
Issue	Cover model	Photographer	Ref.
Spring	Alexandra Agoston	Chris Colls	

=== 2026 ===
Issue	Cover model	Photographer	Ref.
January	Brigitte Bardot	Laurent Vergez	
April/May	Adriana Karembeu	Ellen Von Unwerth	
June/July/August	Énora Malagré, Carla Lazzari, Constance Gay, Anne Depetrini, Sixtine Moullé-Berteaux, Sylvie Tellier, Corinne Masiero, Esther Abrami, Enora Hope, Frédérique Bel, Noémie de Lattre, Reem Kherici, Séverine Ferrer, Nadia Farès, Elisa Bachir Bey, Andréa Bescond, Aurélie Konaté	Sylvie Castioni	
June/July/August	Bob Sinclar, Paloma Bonnie Le Friant	Jeanne Pieprzownik	
September	Milla Lapidus, Koukla Lapidus	Yves Kortum	
September	Uncredited, uncredited, uncredited		

== See also ==
- Lists of Playboy models
