= Le courrier du cœur =

Single by Jacques Dutronc
- Released: 1968
- Recorded: 1968
- Genre: French rock
- Length: 2:08
- Label: Disques Vogue
- Songwriter(s): Jacques Lanzmann, Anne Ségalen, Jacques Dutronc
- Producer(s): Unknown

Jacques Dutronc singles chronology
"Il est cinq heures, Paris s'éveille" (1967)	"Le courrier du cœur" (1968)	"L'opportuniste" (1968)

"Le courrier du cœur" (French pronunciation: [lə kuʁje dy kœʁ], lit. 'The advice column') is the seventh single by the French singer-songwriter Jacques Dutronc. It was released in 1968. The song was recorded for his second album, Jacques Dutronc. It reached number 8 on the French singles chart in summer 1968.

== Track listing ==
Words by Jacques Lanzmann and Anne Ségalen, music by Jacques Dutronc.

=== Side A ===
No.	Title	Length
1.	"Le courrier du cœur"	02:08
2.	"Ça prend, ça n'prend pas"	03:20

=== Side B ===
No.	Title	Length
1.	"La métaphore"	03:20
2.	"Les métamorphoses"	02:27
