= Jacques Dutronc (1966 album) =

1966 album by Jacques Dutronc

Studio album by Jacques Dutronc
- Released: 1966 (France)
- Recorded: 1966
- Genre: French rock
- Length: 32:43
- Label: Disques Vogue

Jacques Dutronc chronology
Jacques Dutronc (1966)	Jacques Dutronc (1968)

Jacques Dutronc is the first studio album by the French singer-songwriter Jacques Dutronc, released in 1966. Since Dutronc's first seven albums are all self-titled, the album is commonly referred to by the title of any of its three tracks which were released as singles ("Et moi, et moi, et moi", "Les play boys" and "Les Cactus").

== Reception ==
The album went straight to number one in the French charts upon its release and sold over a million copies in total. The single "Les play boys" was number one in the French charts from 3 December 1966 until 13 January 1967. In recognition of the album's success, Dutronc was awarded a special Grand Prix du Disque by the Académie Charles Cros, in memoriam of one of its founders.

The album is included in Philippe Manœuvre's 2010 book Rock français, de Johnny à BB Brunes, 123 albums essentiels, which contains reviews of the 123 "most essential" French-language rock albums.

Professional ratings
Review scores
Source	Rating
AllMusic	4/5 stars
Music Story	5/5 stars

== Track listing ==
Words by Jacques Lanzmann and music by Jacques Dutronc, with the exception of La Compapadé, words and music by Jacques Dutronc.

No.	Title	Length
1.	"Les play boys"	3:08
2.	"L'espace d'une fille"	2:45
3.	"Sur une nappe de restaurant"	2:15
4.	"J'ai mis un tigre dans ma guitare"	2:21
5.	"Les Cactus"	2:42
6.	"Et moi, et moi, et moi"	2:55
7.	"L'opération"	3:09
8.	"On nous cache tout, on nous dit rien"	2:36
9.	"La fille du Père Noël"	2:36
10.	"Les gens sont fous, les temps sont flous"	3:03
11.	"La compapadé"	3:19
12.	"Mini-mini-mini"	1:54

== Personnel ==
- Jacques Dutronc - voice, rhythm and lead guitars, percussion, arrangements, orchestra director
- Hadi Kalafate - bass, percussion
- Alain Le Govic (alias Alain Chamfort) - piano, organ
- Jean-Pierre Alarcen - guitar
- Jacques Pasut - rhythm guitar
- Michel Pelay - drums

Technical

- Jean-Marie Périer - photography

=== Weekly charts ===
Chart performance for Jacques Dutronc
Chart (2026)	Peak position
Greek Albums (IFPI)	79
