= List of number-one singles of 1967 (France) =

This is a list of the French Singles & Airplay Chart Reviews number-ones of 1967.

== Summary ==
=== Singles Chart ===
Week	Date	Artist	Single
1	7 January	Jacques Dutronc	"Les play boys"
2	14 January	Mireille Mathieu	"Paris en Colère"
3	21 January	Mireille Mathieu	"Paris en Colère"
4	28 January	Salvatore Adamo	"Inch Allah"
5	4 February	Salvatore Adamo	"Inch Allah"
6	11 February	Salvatore Adamo	"Inch Allah"
7	18 February	Salvatore Adamo	"Inch Allah"
8	25 February	Salvatore Adamo	"Inch Allah"
9	4 March	Johnny Hallyday	"Hey Joe"
10	11 March	Johnny Hallyday	"Hey Joe"
11	18 March	Johnny Hallyday	"Hey Joe"
12	25 March	Johnny Hallyday	"Hey Joe"
13	1 April	Johnny Hallyday	"Hey Joe"
14	8 April	Johnny Hallyday	"Hey Joe"
15	15 April	Johnny Hallyday	"Hey Joe"
16	22 April	Johnny Hallyday	"Hey Joe"
17	29 April	Johnny Hallyday	"Hey Joe"
18	6 May	Jacques Dutronc	"J'aime les filles"
19	13 May	Jacques Dutronc	"J'aime les filles"
20	20 May	Procol Harum	"A Whiter Shade of Pale"
21	27 May	Procol Harum	"A Whiter Shade of Pale"
22	3 June	Procol Harum	"A Whiter Shade of Pale"
23	10 June	Procol Harum	"A Whiter Shade of Pale"
24	17 June	Procol Harum	"A Whiter Shade of Pale"
25	24 June	Procol Harum	"A Whiter Shade of Pale"
26	1 July	Procol Harum	"A Whiter Shade of Pale"
27	8 July	Procol Harum	"A Whiter Shade of Pale"
28	15 July	Procol Harum	"A Whiter Shade of Pale"
29	22 July	The Beatles	"All You Need Is Love"
30	29 July	Sheila	"Adios Amor"
31	5 August	Sheila	"Adios Amor"
32	12 August	Sheila	"Adios Amor"
33	19 August	Sheila	"Adios Amor"
34	26 August	Sheila	"Adios Amor"
35	2 September	Sheila	"Adios Amor"
36	9 September	Sheila	"Adios Amor"
37	16 September	Sheila	"Adios Amor"
38	23 September	Box Tops	"The Letter"
39	30 September	Salvatore Adamo	"Une Larme aux Nuages"
40	7 October	Salvatore Adamo	"Une Larme aux Nuages"
41	14 October	Salvatore Adamo	"Une Larme aux Nuages"
42	21 October	Salvatore Adamo	"Une Larme aux Nuages"
43	28 October	Salvatore Adamo	"Une Larme aux Nuages"
44	4 November	Salvatore Adamo	"Une Larme aux Nuages"
45	11 November	Salvatore Adamo	"Une Larme aux Nuages"
46	18 November	Mireille Mathieu	"La Dernière Valse"
47	25 November	Mireille Mathieu	"La Dernière Valse"
48	2 December	Mireille Mathieu	"La Dernière Valse"
49	9 December	Sheila	"Dans une Heure"
50	16 December	Sheila	"Dans une Heure"
51	23 December	Sheila	"Dans une Heure"
52	30 December	Johnny Hallyday	"San Francisco"

== See also ==
- 1967 in music
- List of number-one hits (France)
