= Alright, Alright, Alright =

Single by Mungo Jerry

from the album Long Legged Woman
- B-side: "Little Miss Hipshake"
- Released: 1973
- Genre: Pop, rock
- Length: 2:47
- Label: Dawn Records (UK)
- Songwriters: Jacques Dutronc, Jacques Lanzmann and Joe Strange
- Producers: Barry Murray, Ray Dorset

Mungo Jerry singles chronology
"My Girl and Me" (1972)	"Alright, Alright, Alright" (1973)	"Wild Love" (1973)

"Alright, Alright, Alright" is a popular song and hit single by the British group Mungo Jerry, first released in 1973.

== Chart performance ==
It was written by Jacques Dutronc, Jacques Lanzmann and Joe Strange and produced by Barry Murray and Mungo Jerry's lead vocalist Ray Dorset. Heavily adapted from Dutronc's French original "Et moi, et moi, et moi", the song entered the UK Singles Chart in July 1973 and reached No. 3 staying for twelve weeks on the chart. The song peaked at number 26 in Australia but just number 94 in Canada.

It was the first Mungo Jerry single to be issued in the UK only as a conventional 45 RPM two-track single without picture sleeve. Their first six had all been maxi-singles with picture sleeves, playing at 33 RPM and containing three or four tracks in total, although in some cases, limited editions of two-track 45 RPM pressings had been made available for jukeboxes.
