= La publicité =

Single by Jacques Dutronc
- Released: 1967
- Recorded: 1967
- Genre: French rock
- Length: 2:19
- Label: Disques Vogue (France)
- Songwriter(s): Jacques Lanzmann, Anne Ségalen, Jacques Dutronc
- Producer(s): Unknown

Jacques Dutronc singles chronology
"J'aime les filles" (1966)	"La publicité" (1967)	"Il est cinq heures, Paris s'éveille" (1968)

"La publicité" (French pronunciation: [la pyblisite], lit. 'The Advertisement') is a 1967 single by French singer-songwriter Jacques Dutronc.

== Track listing ==
Words by Jacques Lanzmann and Anne Ségalen, music by Jacques Dutronc.

=== Side A ===
No.	Title	Length
1.	"La publicité"	02:19
2.	"Les rois de la réforme"	02:24

=== Side B ===
No.	Title	Length
1.	"Le plus difficule"	02:41
2.	"Hippie hippie hourrah"	03:07
