= Jean Guidoni =

French singer and songwriter (1952–2025)

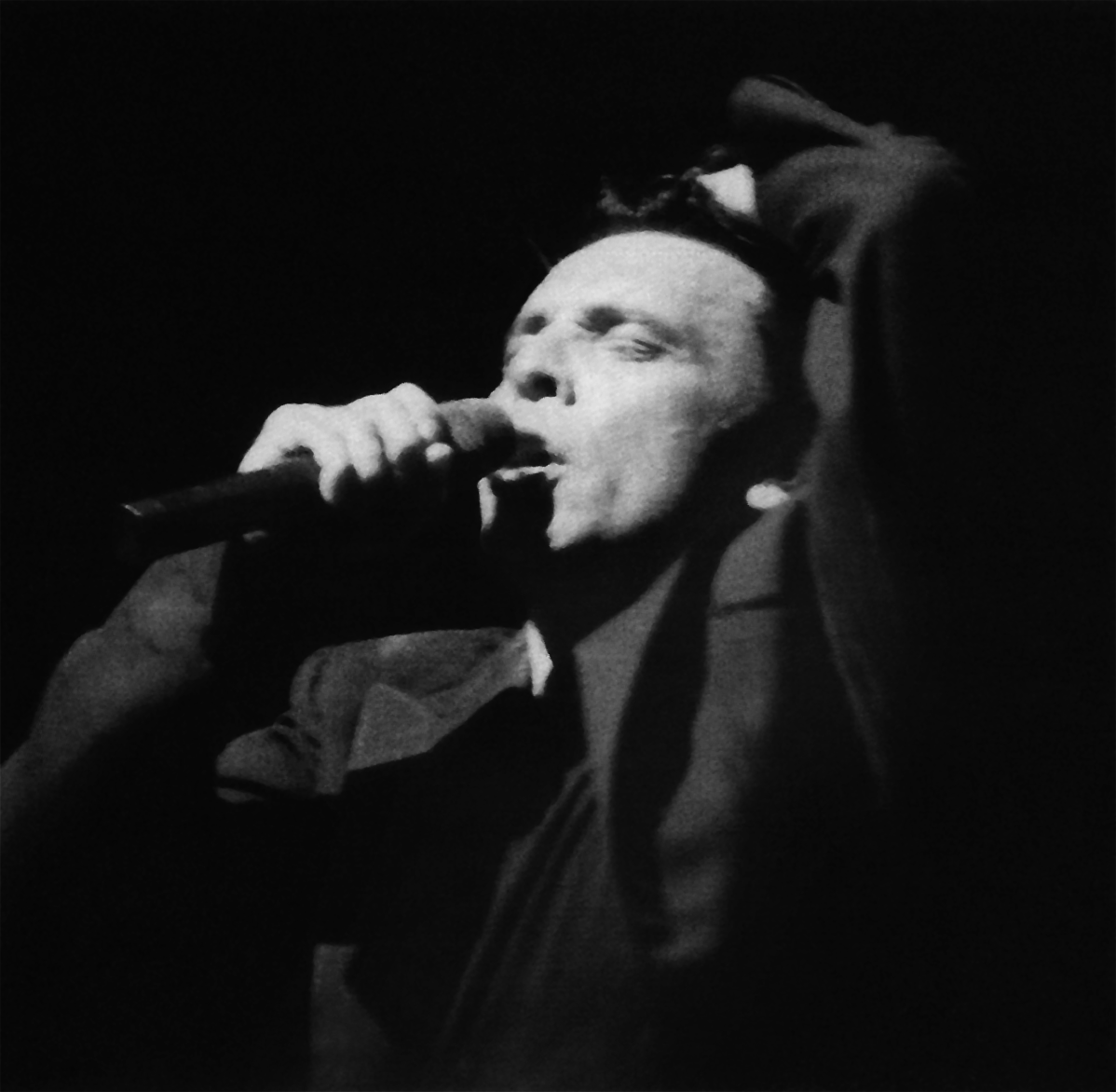
- Guidoni performing in 1988

Background information
- Born: 3 May 1951
- Origin: Toulon, France
- Died: 21 November 2025 (aged 74) Bordeaux, France
- Genres: French pop; pop rock; rock
- Occupation: Singer; songwriter
- Years active: 1975–2025
- Labels: Universal Music Group
- Website: Official website

Jean Guidoni (3 May 1951 – 21 November 2025) was a French singer and songwriter.

== Music career ==
Jean Guidoni started recording in 1975, and in 1977, recorded his first album with a song written by Jacques Lanzmann. Pierre Philippe, wrote for the album Je Marche Dans les Villes ("I walk in the cities") for him, released in 1980. The major themes were homosexuality and BDSM, and the album was awarded the prestigious Grand Prix du Disque for French Song by the Académie Charles Cros in 1981.

The Argentine tango composer Astor Piazzolla composed the music for his next album, still with lyrics by Pierre Philippe, Crime Passionnel. His 1985 album Putains ("Whores") was considered "scandalous".

In 1987, he wrote the lyrics of his album Tigre de Porcelaine, which received one more award from the Académie Charles Cros. In a series of shows, he performed in drag.

In 1995, the film-composer Michel Legrand composed the music for his album Vertigo, containing a song about dealing with AIDS, N'Oublie Jamais Qui Tu Es. Juliette Noureddine, who formerly worked with Pierre Philippe, participated in the writing of the 1999 show Fin de Siècle.

His next album was released in 2004, with lyrics by writers Marie Nimier and Jean Rouaud, on music by new Francophone singers such as Daniel Lavoie and Édith Fambuena. La Pointe Rouge saw the participation of Dominique A, Philippe Katerine and Jeanne Cherhal, among others.

In 2008, he paid homage to French poet Jacques Prévert with an album of his songs, two of which with music by Thierry Escaich.

== Personal life and death ==
Jean Guidoni never hid his homosexuality and chose to perform many songs with LGBT-related themes.

Guidoni died on 21 November 2025, at the age of 74.

== Discography ==
- Guidoni 77 (1977)
- Guidoni 78 (1978)
- Je marche dans les villes (1980)
- Crime passionnel (1982)
- Le Rouge et le Rose (1983)
- Putains (1985)
- Tigre de porcelaine (1987)
- Aux tourniquets des grands cafés (1990)
- Cas particuliers (1993)
- Vertigo (1995)
- Trapèze (2004)
- La Pointe rouge (2007)
- Chante Prévert – Étranges étrangers (2008)
- Paris – Milan (2014)
- Légendes urbaines (2017)
- Avec des si (2022)

=== Live albums ===
- Chromos (1986)
- Jean Guidoni à L'Olympia (1988)
- Concert 1989
- Fin de siècle 1 & 2 (1999–2000)
- Crime passionnel (2001)

=== Best of ===
- Fenêtre sur cœur (1997)
- Long Box (2003)
- Scènes de vie (2004)
