= Grand Prix du Disque for French Song =

The Grand Prix du Disque for French Song is one of a number of prizes awarded by L'Académie Charles Cros as part of the yearly Grand Prix du Disque. The following is a partial list of winners (sometimes more than one per year):

== 1948 ==
- Les Compagnons de la chanson for "La Marie"
- Jacqueline François

== 1949 ==
- Henri Salvador

== 1951 ==
- Félix Leclerc for Moi, mes souliers
- Francis Lemarque

== 1954 ==
- Georges Brassens for Les amoureux des bancs publiques

== 1956 ==
- François Deguelt

== 1959 ==
- Serge Gainsbourg for Du chant à la une!

== 1963 ==
- Jean Ferrat for Nuit et brouillard
- Françoise Hardy for her debut studio album Tous les garçons et les filles

== 1964 ==
- Nana Mouskouri for Mes plus belles chansons grecques (Grand Prix de Musicologie pour le Folklore)
- Sheila
- Claude François
- Jacques Brel for the song "Amsterdam"

== 1965 ==
- Barbara for Barbara chante Barbara
- Serge Reggiani

== 1966 ==
- Jacqueline Dulac for Lorsqu'on est heureux

== 1967 ==
- Nana Mouskouri for Le coeur trop tendre (Grand Prix de la chanson)
- Régine (Prix Pierre-Brive Consécration)
- Jacques Dutronc (Prix Pierre-Brive Consécration)

== 1968 ==
- Michel Delpech for Il y a des jours où on ferait mieux de rester au lit

== 1969 ==
- Julien Clerc for Julien Clerc (debut album)
- Frida Boccara for «Un jour, un enfant» (album)

== 1970 ==
- Brigitte Fontaine for Comme à la radio
- Gilles Vigneault for Du milieu du pont
- Dani for her debut album

== 1971 ==
- Mogollar for Rythmes de la Turquie d'hier à aujourd'hui

== 1973 ==
- Francis Lemarque for Paris populi

== 1974 ==
- Nicoletta for Enfants venez chanter l'espoir

== 1976 ==
- Jean Michel Jarre for Oxygene
- Jacques Higelin for Alertez les bébés
- Julos Beaucame for the whole of his work

== 1977 ==
- Yves Duteil for La tarantelle
- Ange for Par les fils de Mandrin

== 1980 ==
- Jean Guidoni for Je marche dans les villes

== 1982 ==
- Bernard Haillant for Des mots chair, des mots sang

== 1984 ==
- Léo Ferré for Léo Ferré au Théâtre des Champs-Elysées
- Jean Michel Jarre for Zoolook
- Jane Birkin for Baby Alone in Babylone

== 1985 ==
- Morice Benin for Chants de solitude

== 1987 ==
- Jean Guidoni for Tigre de porcelaine

== 1989 ==
- Francis Lemarque

== 1995 ==
- Gigi Bourdin and La Rouchta for Les Ours du Scorff

== 1996 ==
- Renée Claude for On a marché sur l'amour
- Brigitte Fontaine for Genre humain

== 1997 ==
- Romain Didier for En concert

== 1998 ==
- Rodolphe Burger for Meteor Show
- Claude Nougaro for L'enfant phare

== 2000 ==
- Alan Wilder for Liquid

== 2002 ==
- Arno for Arno Charles Ernest (Delabel 7243 81 19592 5)
- Zebda for Utopie d'occase (Barclay 065088–2)
- Juliette for Le festin de Juliette (Polydor 589 593) (Adami Prize)

== 2003 ==
- Entre deux caisses for Faute de grives...
- Mickey 3D for Tu vas pas mourir de rire
- Herman van Veen for Chapeau (Francophonie award)

== 2004 ==
- Richard Desjardins for Kanasuta (Francophonie award)
- Jeanne Cherhal for 12 fois par an (Singer award)
- Tryo for Grain De Sable (Group award)

== 2005 ==
- Clarika for Joker
- Agnès Bihl for Merci Maman, merci Papa
- Pierre Lapointe (Francophonie award)

== 2006 ==
- Claire Diterzi for Boucle
- Renan Luce for Repenti (Discovery award)

== 2007 ==
- Ridan for L’ange de mon démon
- Amélie les Crayons for La porte plume

== 2008 ==
- Christophe for Aimer ce que nous sommes
- Alex Beaupain for 33 Tours
- Louise Forestier for Ephémères (Francophonie award)

== 2009 ==
- La Grande Sophie for Des vagues et des ruisseaux
- Benjamin Biolay for La Superbe
- Ariane Moffatt for Tous les sens (Francophonie award)

== 2010 ==
- Alain Chamfort (in honorem)
- Bertrand Belin for Hypernuit
- Zaz for Zaz

== 2011 ==
- Louis Chedid (in honorem)
- Daphné for Bleu Venise
- L for Initiale
