= Quartier du Faubourg-Montmartre =

Coordinates: 48.8733536°N 2.3471750°E

Faubourg-Montmartre
- Quartier du Faubourg-Montmartre
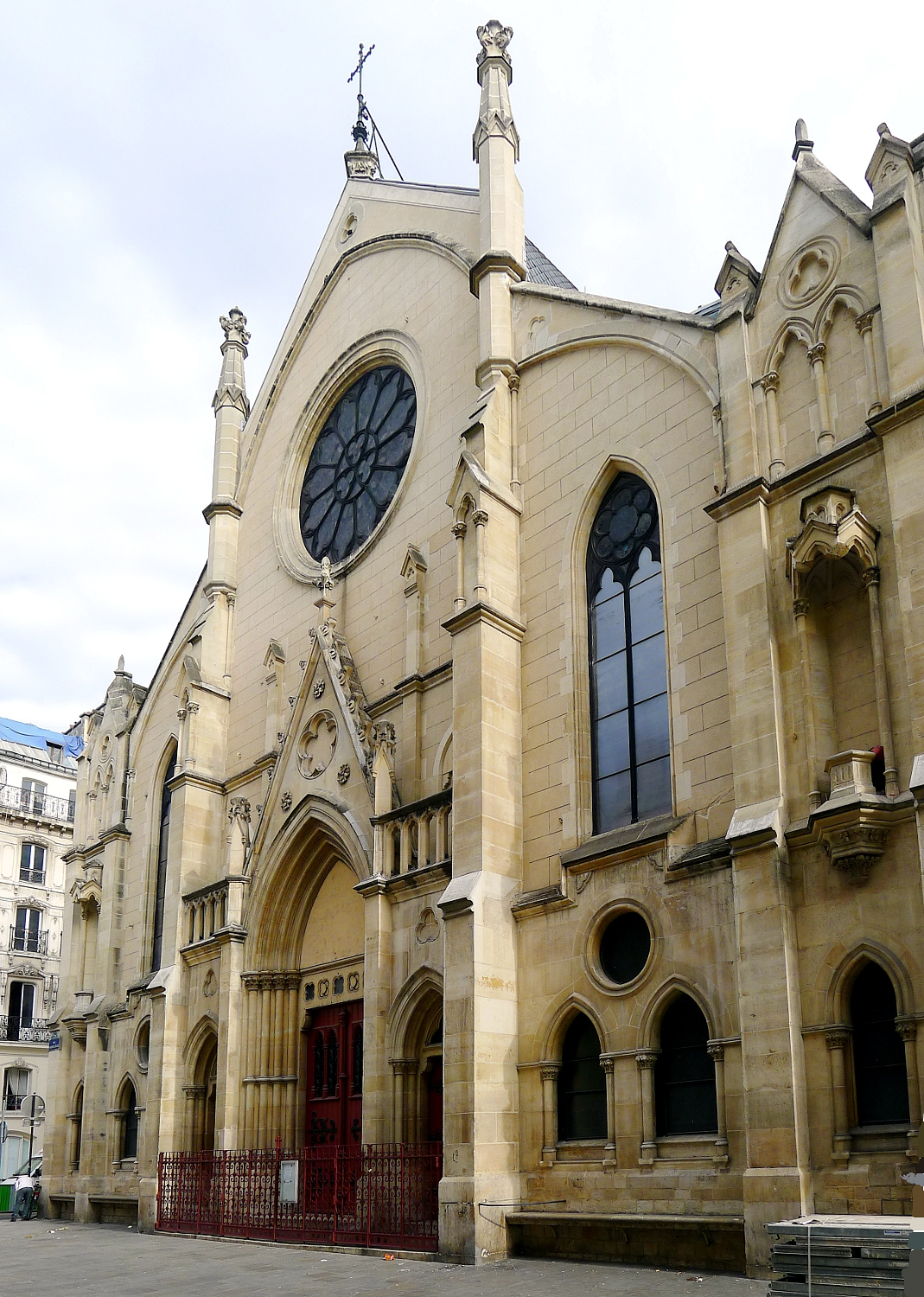
- Saint-Eugène-Sainte-Cécile
- Interactive map of Faubourg-Montmartre
- Country: France
- Region: Île-de-France
- Ville: Paris
- Arrondissement: 9th

Area
  - Total: 0.417 km^{2} (0.161 sq mi)

Population (2016)
  - Total: 11,253
  - Density: 26,986/km^{2} (69,890/sq mi)

The Quartier du Faubourg-Montmartre is the 35th administrative district of Paris, located in the southeast of the 9th arrondissement.

== Location and boundaries ==
The Quarters of the 9th arrondissement.

The Faubourg-Montmartre district is bounded to the east by Rue du Faubourg-Poissonnière, to the north by Rue de Montholon and Rue Lamartine, to the west by Rue Fléchier, Rue de Chateaudun, and Rue Laffitte, and to the south by the Boulevards des Italiens, Montmartre, and Poissonnière, extending as far as Rue du Faubourg-Poissonnière.

== History ==
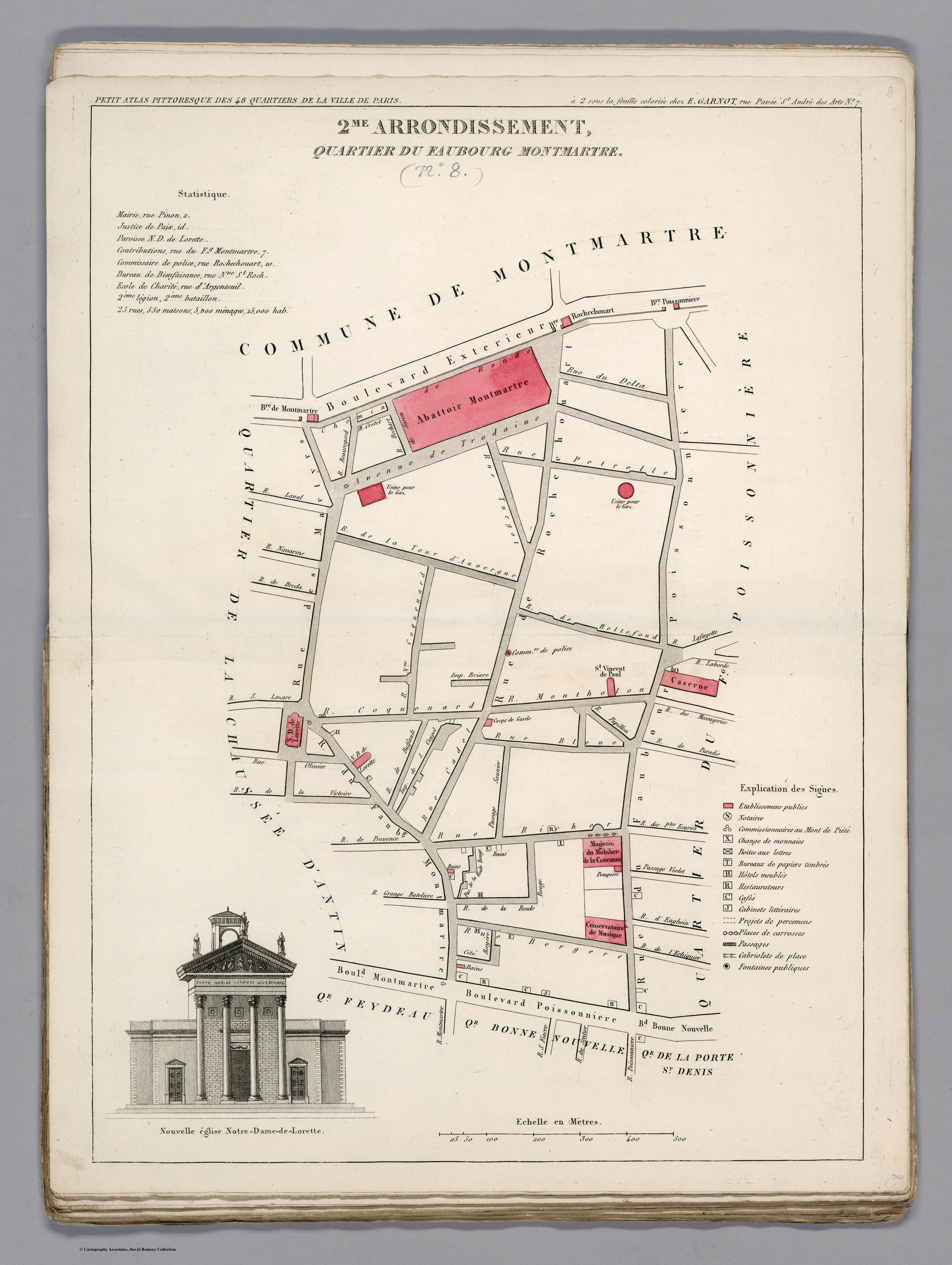
Map of the Faubourg Montmartre neighborhood in the former 2nd arrondissement in 1834.

This district was created in 1790, during the French Revolution, under the revolutionary name "section du Faubourg-Montmartre." By a prefectural decree dated May 10, 1811, the "section du Faubourg-Montmartre"—which was located within the former 2nd arrondissement of Paris—was renamed the "quartier du Faubourg-Montmartre."

At that time, its boundaries were defined by the even-numbered addresses on Boulevard Poissonnière, the even-numbered addresses on Rue du Faubourg-Montmartre, the Wall of the Farmers-General (extending from the Barrière des Martyrs to the Barrière Poissonnière), and the odd-numbered addresses on Rue du Faubourg-Poissonnière. The law of June 16, 1859, assigned this administrative district to the 9th arrondissement, with the following boundaries: a line beginning at Boulevard des Italiens, following the axis of Rue Laffitte and Rue Fléchier, Rue Lamartine and Rue de Montholon, and Rue du Faubourg-Poissonnière, then continuing along the boulevards Poissonnière, Montmartre, and des Italiens, returning to the starting point.

== Specific sites ==
The neighborhood is bordered to the south by the Grands Boulevards. This proximity likely explains why it contains a large number of performance venues. The most famous is undoubtedly the music hall Les Folies Bergère, located on Rue Richer—a name derived from the nearby Rue Bergère. Also found here are the Théâtre Trévise (which specializes in one-man shows), the Théâtre des Nouveautés (known for comédie de boulevard—lighthearted, mainstream French comedy), and Le Palace, which has recently returned to its original purpose after spending the 1970s as a legendary nightclub. The Max Linder Panorama is located at 24 Boulevard Poissonnière. It features a single screening room, which nonetheless boasts 560 seats and a large screen. The 9th arrondissement town hall is situated on Rue Drouot, housed in a former 18th-century private mansion (hôtel particulier) that underwent significant alterations during the following century. This street is also home to the Drouot auction house; the building is used by various firms of auctioneers. Rue Drouot was also the site of the Golf-Drouot—a very small concert venue located on the first floor of a building bordering Boulevard Montmartre. It enjoyed its heyday in the 1960s before eventually disappearing. The building still stands, but the concert venue is no longer there.

== In literature ==
Writing for the newspaper Détective, and drawing upon his own experiences and knowledge, Joseph Kessel wrote: "The cafés of the Faubourg Montmartre teemed with a shady underworld: Levantines, pederasts, and drug dealers. Cohorts of anemic young prostitutes with blood-red lips seemed to have sprouted from the sticky pavement."

A large part of the adventures of Nana—from the novel of the same name by Émile Zola—also takes place in this neighborhood.
