= Les Cactus =

Single by Jacques Dutronc
- Released: February 1967
- Recorded: 1966
- Genre: French rock
- Length: 2:42
- Label: Disques Vogue
- Songwriters: Jacques Lanzmann, Jacques Dutronc
- Producer: Unknown

Jacques Dutronc singles chronology
"Les play boys" (1966)	"Les Cactus" (1967)	"J'aime les filles" (1967)

"Les Cactus" (French pronunciation: [le kaktys], lit. 'The Cactus') is a song by French singer-songwriter Jacques Dutronc, released in 1967 as the third and final single from his 1966 self-titled debut album.

It reached number 4 in the French singles chart in March 1967, selling over 400,000 copies.

"Les Cactus" was referenced by French Prime Minister Georges Pompidou in the Assemblée Nationale to indicate his feelings towards his former Finance Minister, Valéry Giscard d'Estaing, who was a harsh critic of his successor Michel Debré: "As Jacques Dutronc says, there is a cactus here". The comment made front-page news.

A live cover of the song was released as a single by Vanessa Paradis in 1994, and it was covered by The Last Shadow Puppets on their The Dream Synopsis EP.

== Track listing ==
Words by Jacques Lanzmann and music by Jacques Dutronc, except "La Compapade", words and music by Jacques Dutronc.

=== Side A ===
No.	Title	Length
1.	"Les Cactus"	02:42
2.	"L'espace d'une fille"	02:45

=== Side B ===
No.	Title	Length
1.	"L'opération"	03:09
2.	"La Compapade"	03:19

== Personnel ==
- Jacques Dutronc: voice, guitar, percussion
- Hadi Kalafate: bass, percussion
- Alain Le Govic (alias Alain Chamfort): piano, organ
- Jean-Pierre Alarcen: guitar
- Jacques Pasut: rhythm guitar
- Michel Pelay: drums
