= Et moi, et moi, et moi =

- French EP picture sleeve

Single by Jacques Dutronc
- Released: September 1966
- Genre: French rock
- Length: 2:52
- Label: Disques Vogue
- Songwriter(s): Jacques Lanzmann, Jacques Dutronc

Jacques Dutronc singles chronology
"Et moi, et moi, et moi" (1966)	"Les play boys" (1966)

"Et moi, et moi, et moi" (French pronunciation: [e mwa e mwa e mwa], lit. 'And me, and me, and me') is the debut single by French singer-songwriter Jacques Dutronc, released in 1966. It is featured on his self-titled debut album.

== Composition ==
The record came about as the result of rivalry between the two artistic directors at Disques Vogue, Christian Fechner and Jacques Wolfsohn. According to legend, Wolfsohn, who had previously promoted Françoise Hardy, used to amuse himself by taking pot-shots at Fechner's Revox tape-machine with a rifle from his office window. Wolfsohn wanted to better Fechner's success with the hippy-influenced singer-songwriter Antoine. He asked Jacques Dutronc, at that time his assistant and a songwriter at Vogue, and the novelist Jacques Lanzmann to work on songs for a rival act, a singer called Benjamin. Benjamin released an EP in 1966, featuring songs written with Dutronc and a Lanzmann-Dutronc composition, "Cheveux longs" (Long Hair). However, Wolfsohn was disappointed by Benjamin's recording of "Et moi, et moi, moi". A second version was recorded, with Dutronc's former bandmate Hadi Kalafate on vocals. Wolfsohn then asked Dutronc if he would be interested in recording his own version.

The words to "Et moi, et moi et moi" have been described as sending up the socially conscious but "self-involved" lyrical style of Antoine, with Lanzmann and Dutronc perhaps suggesting doubt as to its sincerity. In the song, Dutronc alternates between thinking about people in different places around the world and thinking about himself. The opening of the song is Sept cent millions de chinois/Et moi, et moi, et moi ("Seven hundred million Chinese people/And then there's me"). According to Lanzmann, the song is "about complete selfishness...all the terrible things that go on a stone's-throw away, that touch us but that, nevertheless, do not prevent us from continuing to live and enjoy the evening's barbecue". Musically, the song's fuzzy, choppy guitar line bears the influence of the Pretty Things and the Kinks.

== Release and promotion ==
"Et moi, et moi, et moi" was released as the lead track on a four-track EP (EPL. 8461) by Vogue in France in August 1966. In the UK and The Netherlands, it was released as a 2-track 7" single, with "Mini, mini, mini" as the b-side. In Germany, "Mini, mini, mini" was released as an a-side, backed with "Et moi, et moi, et moi". For the Italian market, an Italian-language version titled "Il Mundo Va Cosi" was recorded. A version in Japanese was also attempted but was not released.

Dutronc performed "Et moi, et moi, et moi" on the French television show Le palmarès des chansons, broadcast on Channel One by the Office de Radiodiffusion Télévision Française on 29 September 1966. He also toured to promote the single.

== Reception ==
"Et moi, et moi, et moi" reached number 2 in the French singles chart in September 1966 and number 7 in the Swiss chart the following month. It also gained popularity on the British mod scene where, despite the language barrier, it was appreciated as satirising the folk revival movement.

Cultural historian Larry Portis describes the arrival of Dutronc on the French music scene, along with that of Michel Polnareff at around the same time, as representing "the first French rock music that can be considered a musically competent and non-imitative incorporation of African-American and African-American-British influences". For Portis, Dutronc marks a break with the literary tradition of French chanson in his creative use of the sounds, rather than just the syntax, of the language.

"Et moi, et moi, et moi" is featured in the coffee table book 1001 Songs You Must Hear Before You Die, published in 2010. In 2011, it was included in a series of 41 articles on songs that "define France", published in Le Figaro.

== Cover versions ==
The British band Mungo Jerry reached number 3 in the UK singles chart in 1973 with an English-language reinterpretation of "Et moi, et moi, et moi" titled "Alright, Alright, Alright". This version is credited to Lanzmann, Dutronc and Joe Strange. It features on Mungo Jerry's 1974 album Long Legged Woman Dressed In Black.

The original version of the song was covered in 1988 by the Spanish synth-pop artist Captain B Hardt. A recording of the song also appears on the 1989 compilation I Can't Come by punk band the Snivelling Shits. Yo La Tengo bassist James McNew, under his solo moniker Dump, released a cover of the song on his 1997 album A Plea for Tenderness. In 2002, Bruno Blum included a parody of the song, titled "Et moi, et moi etc", on his album Think Différent (sic). In July 2013, the French singer-songwriter -M- performed a version of "Et moi, et moi, et moi" for the website of Le Figaro.

Israeli singer-songwriter Ariel Zilber recorded a Hebrew version of the song, entitled Milyard Sinim ("One Billion Chinese") in 1988. Translated by Yehonatan Gefen, the Hebrew text is a fairly accurate reflection of the French, and the chorus is exact. Loosely retranslated into English: "One billion Chinese are alive / And me, who am I, what am I? / With my private life / And my tooth that's been loose for four days / I think about it and then I forget / Because that's how life is" ("J'y pense et puis j'oublie / C'est la vie c'est la vie").

Industrial rock band KMFDM included a cover version of "Et moi, et moi, et moi," entitled "Mini Mini Mini," on their 2005 album Hau Ruck.

== Track listing ==
Words by Jacques Lanzmann and music by Jacques Dutronc.

=== Side A ===
1. "Et moi, et moi, et moi" – 2:52
2. "J'ai mis un tigre dans ma guitare" – 2:21

=== Side B ===
1. "Mini, mini, mini" – 1:54
2. "Les gens sont fous, les temps sont flous" – 3:03

== Personnel ==
- Jacques Dutronc : voice, guitar, percussion
- Hadi Kalafate : bass, percussion
- Alain Le Govic (alias Alain Chamfort) : piano, organ
- Jean-Pierre Alarcen : guitar
- Jacques Pasut : rhythm guitar
- Michel Pelay : drums
