= List of number-one singles of 1966 (France) =

This is a list of the French Singles & Airplay Chart Reviews number-ones of 1966.

== Summary ==
=== Singles Chart ===
Week	Issue Date	Artist	Single
1	1 January	Sheila	"Le Folklore Américain"
2	8 January	Henri Salvador	"Le Travail C'est la Santé"
3	15 January	Charles Aznavour	"La Bohème"
4	22 January	Charles Aznavour	"La Bohème"
5	29 January	Charles Aznavour	"La Bohème"
6	5 February	The Beatles	"Michelle"
7	12 February	The Beatles	"Michelle"
8	19 February	The Beatles	"Michelle"
9	26 February	Salvatore Adamo	"Une Mèche de Cheveux"
10	5 March	Salvatore Adamo	"Une Mèche de Cheveux"
11	12 March	Salvatore Adamo	"Une Mèche de Cheveux"
12	19 March	Salvatore Adamo	"Une Mèche de Cheveux"
13	26 March	Salvatore Adamo	"Une Mèche de Cheveux"
14	2 April	Mireille Mathieu	"Mon Crédo"
15	9 April	Mireille Mathieu	"Mon Crédo"
16	16 April	Sheila	"Le Cinéma"
17	23 April	Sheila	"Le Cinéma"
18	30 April	Sheila	"Le Cinéma"
19	7 May	Sheila	"Le Cinéma"
20	14 May	Sheila	"Le Cinéma"
21	21 May	Sheila	"Le Cinéma"
22	28 May	Johnny Hallyday	"Cheveux Longs, Idées Courtes"
23	4 June	Johnny Hallyday	"Cheveux Longs, Idées Courtes"
24	11 June	Johnny Hallyday	"Cheveux Longs, Idées Courtes"
25	18 June	Salvatore Adamo	"Ton Nom"
26	25 June	Salvatore Adamo	"Ton Nom"
27	2 July	Salvatore Adamo	"Ton Nom"
28	9 July	Michel Polnareff	"Love Me, Please Love Me"
29	16 July	Salvatore Adamo	"Ton Nom"
30	23 July	Salvatore Adamo	"Ton Nom"
31	30 July	Salvatore Adamo	"Ton Nom"
32	6 August	Salvatore Adamo	"Ton Nom"
33	13 August	Salvatore Adamo	"Ton Nom"
34	20 August	Salvatore Adamo	"Ton Nom"
35	27 August	Salvatore Adamo	"Ton Nom"
36	3 September	Salvatore Adamo	"Ton Nom"
37	10 September	Salvatore Adamo	"Ton Nom"
38	17 September	Salvatore Adamo	"Ton Nom"
39	24 September	Salvatore Adamo	"Ton Nom"
40	1 October	Johnny Hallyday	"Noir, C'est Noir"
41	8 October	Johnny Hallyday	"Noir, C'est Noir"
42	15 October	Johnny Hallyday	"Noir, C'est Noir"
43	22 October	Johnny Hallyday	"Noir, C'est Noir"
44	29 October	Sheila	"L'Heure de la Sortie"
45	5 November	Salvatore Adamo	"Le Coeur en Bandoulière"
46	12 November	Salvatore Adamo	"Le Coeur en Bandoulière"
47	19 November	Sheila	"L'Heure de la Sortie"
48	26 November	Sheila	"L'Heure de la Sortie"
49	3 December	Jacques Dutronc	"Les play boys"
50	10 December	Jacques Dutronc	"Les play boys"
51	17 December	Jacques Dutronc	"Les play boys"
52	24 December	Jacques Dutronc	"Les play boys"
53	31 December	Jacques Dutronc	"Les play boys"

== See also ==
- 1966 in music
- List of number-one hits (France)
