= Jacques Dutronc (1968 album) =

1968 album by Jacques Dutronc

Studio album by Jacques Dutronc
- Released: 1968 (France)
- Recorded: 1968
- Genre: French rock
- Length: 32:42
- Label: Disques Vogue

Jacques Dutronc chronology
Jacques Dutronc (1966)	Jacques Dutronc (1968)	L'opportuniste (1968)

Jacques Dutronc is the second studio album by the French singer-songwriter Jacques Dutronc, released in 1968. Since Dutronc's first seven albums are all self-titled, the album is commonly referred to by the title Il est cinq heures, after one of its singles. It is also sometimes referred to as Comment elles dorment, after its opening track. Jean-Marie Périer was credited for the front cover photography.

The single "Il est cinq heures, Paris s'éveille" was number one on the French charts for one week, from 23 March 1968.

== Covers ==
Garage rock band Black Lips covered "Hippie Hippie Hourrah" on their third LP, Let It Bloom, released in 2005.

Professional ratings
Review scores
Source	Rating
AllMusic	4.5/5 stars

== Track listing ==
Words by Jacques Lanzmann and Anne Ségalen. Music by Jacques Dutronc.

No.	Title	Length
1.	"Comment elles dorment"	3:14
2.	"Fais pas ci, fais pas ça"	1:43
3.	"La Métaphore"	3:20
4.	"La Publicité"	2:26
5.	"L'augmentation"	2:36
6.	"Hippie hippie hourrah"	3:13
7.	"Il est cinq heures, Paris s'éveille" (Flute solo by Roger Bourdin)	2:55
8.	"Les Métamorphoses"	2:27
9.	"Ça prend, ça n'prend pas"	3:24
10.	"Les Rois de la réforme"	2:29
11.	"Le Courrier du cœur"	2:11
12.	"Le Plus difficile"	2:44
