= Return to the Beloved =

1979 film

- Film poster
- Directed by: Jean-François Adam
- Written by: Jean-François Adam; Jean-Claude Carrière; Benoît Jacquot
- Produced by: Benjamin Simon
- Starring: Isabelle Huppert
- Cinematography: Pierre Lhomme
- Music by: Antoine Duhamel
- Distributed by: S.N. Prodis
- Release date: 2 May 1979
- Running time: 98 minutes
- Country: France
- Language: French

Return to the Beloved (French: Retour à la bien-aimée) is a 1979 French drama film directed by Jean-François Adam. Starring Isabelle Huppert, Jacques Dutronc and Bruno Ganz, it tells the story of a man who tries to win back his ex-wife by framing her new husband for murder.

== Plot ==
Julien, a well-known concert pianist until his divorce, has become obsessed with regaining his ex-wife Jeanne and their little son Thomas. Living in the family home outside Paris that he left to her, she has now married a German doctor named Stephan and broken off all contact with him. He blackmails a private detective named Keller to murder the husband but, as the man approaches the house at night, Julien instead shoots him dead with Stephan's revolver that he had stolen earlier. He had also scattered other clues to incriminate the doctor. The body is found by young Thomas, upon which Jeanne sends an urgent message to Julien asking him to come and support her with their traumatised child.

Already dismayed over an unexplained body in the grounds, Stephan now has to put up with the proprietorial airs of Julien. The police, initially mystified over this tense ménage à trois, come up with an ingenious solution. They ostensibly arrest Stephan, in fact hiding him in a comfortable hotel, and keep a watch on the remaining two suspects. Jeanne works out Julien's plot, which he does not deny when confronted, saying he only did it so that they could be together again. At this point the police drive up to the house and release Stephan.

== Cast ==
- Isabelle Huppert - Jeanne Kern
- Jacques Dutronc - Julien
- Bruno Ganz - Dr. Stephan Kern
- Christian Rist - Keller
- Jean-François Adam - Police Inspector Corbin
- Rodolphe Schacher - Thomas

== See also ==
- Isabelle Huppert on screen and stage
