= J'aime les filles =

Single by Jacques Dutronc
- Released: 1967
- Recorded: 1967
- Genre: French rock
- Length: 3:00
- Label: Disques Vogue (France), Pye Records (UK)
- Songwriters: Jacques Lanzmann, Jacques Dutronc
- Producer: Unknown

Jacques Dutronc singles chronology
"Les Cactus" (1966)	"J'aime les filles" (1967)	"La publicité" (1967)

"J'aime les filles (si vous êtes comme ça téléphonez moi)" (French pronunciation: [ʒɛm le fij], lit. 'I like girls') is a 1967 single by French singer-songwriter Jacques Dutronc.

It reached number 1 in the French singles chart for two weeks from 6 May 1967.

== Court case ==
In 1977, Dutronc and co-writer Jacques Lanzmann sued an advertising agency for making use of an instrumental version of the song without permission. The agency successfully defended the claim, arguing that the extract they had used was identical in melody to an older song, differing only in rhythm. The case established a precedent in French law that applying a new rhythm to an existing tune does not create a new work for copyright purposes.

== Track listing ==
Words by Jacques Lanzmann and music by Jacques Dutronc.

=== Side A ===
No.	Title	Length
1.	"J'aime les filles"	03:00
2.	"J'ai tout lu, tout vu, tout bu"	01:54

=== Side B ===
No.	Title	Length
1.	"L'idole"	02:45
2.	"Les petites annonces"	02:45

== Personnel ==
- Jacques Dutronc : voice, guitar, percussion
- Hadi Kalafate : bass, percussion
- Alain Le Govic (alias Alain Chamfort) : piano, organ
- Jean-Pierre Alarcen : guitar
- Jacques Pasut : rhythm guitar
- Michel Pelay : drums
