= Byron Newman =

British photographer

Byron Newman (born in London, England, United Kingdom) is a British photographer.

He has been a photographer for over 25 years. Most of the years in partnership with French actress Brigitte Ariel, his producer, stylist, muse and also his wife.

Newman started out studying graphic design and photography at the London College of Printing. Afterwards, he interviewed and photographed musicians for Cream magazine in the 1960s and 1970s. He started his own fashion magazine Deluxe in 1977. From that experience he was offered a job in Paris as the art director with Mode International. Once there he also started working for LUI magazine where he was a staff photographer. Whilst there he met Brigitte Ariel.

== Playboy ==
In 1982, whilst Newman and Ariel were in Hollywood on promoting her latest film, Hugh Hefner got in touch and met them at the Playboy Mansion. Byron has photographed for Playboy magazine, assisted by Brigitte, in the United States since 1984. His photographs appear in Playboy magazine and also are for the Playboy Special Editions. He has also photographed for Playboy's other foreign editions including Germany, France, Italy, Spain, Russia, Mexico, South Africa, Croatia etc.

During the time Byron has worked for them, he has photographed some of Britain's top glamour models including Samantha Fox, Katie Price a.k.a. Jordan, Jessica-Jane Clement, Marina Baker (whom he had discovered and photographed for her Miss March 1987 pictorial), and 2006 Playboy Special Edition model of the year Louise Glover.

His pictorial in Playboy USA (Sept 07) entitled "Rubber Rules" explores the sensuality of latex clothing.

== Books ==
During the 1980s, he produced four books of erotic photographs:

- "English Rose" (USA)
- "Methode Anglaise" (France)
- "The Ultimate Angels" - a photographic exploration of the transsexual community in Paris.
- "Art Nude Collection" (Dia Press Japan)

In 2014, his first novel Landscape of a Woman was published as an ebook. In 2017, his second novel 'First, Last, Everything' was published as an ebook. An exhibition at the Herrick Gallery on Piccadilly, London called Ultimate Angels featuring photos of transgender sex workers in Paris as featured in Newman's book, was held in July 2017.

== Other skills ==
Newman also plays guitar, harmonica and sings in a rock band, Senior Service.
