= Les play boys =

Single by Jacques Dutronc
- Released: November 1966
- Recorded: October 1966
- Genre: French rock
- Length: 3:08
- Label: Disques Vogue
- Songwriters: Jacques Lanzmann, Jacques Dutronc
- Producer: Unknown

Jacques Dutronc singles chronology
"Et moi, et moi, et moi" (1966)	"Les play boys" (1966)	"Les Cactus" (1967)

"Les play boys" is the second single by French singer-songwriter Jacques Dutronc, released in 1966. It features on his self-titled debut album.

== Composition ==
"Les play boys" was recorded in October 1966, shortly after a performance at the Golf-Drouot nightclub in Paris.

According to co-writer Jacques Lanzmann, the song's innuendo-laden lyrics reflected his experience as the editor of the men's magazine Lui: "At that time, even a hint of hair sticking out from a bikini would have seen the magazine shut down".

== Release and promotion ==
"Les play boys" was released as a four-track EP in France in November 1966.

Dutronc performed "Les play boys" on the French television show Palmarès des chansons, broadcast by Office de Radiodiffusion Télévision Française on 16 November 1966, accompanied by the Orchestre Raymond Lefèvre. He also toured to promote the single.

In 1971, he sing the song in duet with Annie Cordy during a show who honored the actress / singer on France 2 named "Annie sur la 2".

== Reception ==
"Les play boys" reached number 1 in the French singles chart on 3 December 1966, where it stayed for six weeks. It sold 600,000 copies.

== Cover versions ==
"Les play boys" has been covered by Serge Gainsbourg and The Divine Comedy.

== Track listing ==
Words by Jacques Lanzmann and music by Jacques Dutronc.

=== Side A ===
No.	Title	Length
1.	"Les play boys"	03:08
2.	"Sur une nappe de restaurant"	02:14

=== Side B ===
No.	Title	Length
1.	"On nous cache tout, on nous dit rien"	02:33
2.	"La fille du Père Noël"	02:33

== Personnel ==
- Jacques Dutronc: voice, guitar, percussion
- Hadi Kalafate: bass, percussion
- Alain Le Govic (alias Alain Chamfort): piano, organ
- Jean-Pierre Alarcen: guitar
- Jacques Pasut: rhythm guitar
- Michel Pelay: drums
