= Marina Baker =

British politician, writer, actor and former model

- Born: Marina Augusta Baker; 8 December 1967 (age 58); Windsor, Berkshire, England
- Other name: Marina Pepper
- Education: London College of Communication; University of Sussex
- Occupations: Politician; journalist; children's book author
- Known for: Playboy Playmate for the Month of March 1987
- Political party: Liberal Democrat
- Children: Charlie Pepper; Boudicca Pepper

Marina Augusta Pepper (née Baker; born 8 December 1967) is an English Liberal Democrat local politician, journalist, children's book author and former model and actress. She was Playboy's Playmate of the Month for March 1987.

== Early life ==
Born in Windsor, Berkshire, and originally from Taplow, Buckinghamshire, she and her older brother Martin "moved around a lot" until they reached Norfolk. She had an unconventional, hippie, nomadic upbringing in the rural environs of Norfolk, as well as different parts of the Midlands and the Southeast. By her own account, her family "thought we were getting a new-built home, but it wasn't ready, and my mother, being as practical as ever, said: 'Well, we are homeless, so we are travellers until we are housed'. I remember trees, bushes and grass and a toilet in a shed. There was this enormous chrome caravan with those sort of lacy doily things in the window, and my birthday party in a tent, playing pass the parcel in the pouring rain. Rain is still my favourite weather". As a girl, her dreams were to become a dancer and prime minister, because she "liked the idea of being in charge".

Baker travelled widely as a teenager spending three years visiting France, Corsica, Italy, Greece and Switzerland, before ending up on Cape Clear, an island off the southern tip of Ireland, "because there was a ferry leaving to go there". She trained as a dancer at Bush Davies ballet school and left with six O-levels, but later abandoned A-levels in Drama, English and History at Norwich City Tech for London.

Her initial career ambition was politics, inspired by her mother's environmental activism as well as her relationship with PR boss Matthew Freud, son of the ex-Liberal MP Clement Freud, whom she met while working as a waitress in London. She said: "I got into it when I was 18. My boyfriend’s father was Clement Freud, and I used to help out. I loved it. Nicholas Parsons would be there stuffing envelopes, and I'd be out chatting to people.... It really suited me knocking on doors going "Hello! How are you? How are things for you? Is your MP helpful? What could be better round here? Oh, I see what you mean ... Terrible state of the roads".

To supplement her modest income, Baker began glamour modeling as a Page 3 girl at age 17 before she was discovered by noted erotic photographer Byron Newman. When asked about what influenced her decision, she answered, "I really didn't have any problems about my body. It wasn't ever an ambition. It was just one of those things—if you are a certain height with a certain look and a certain pneumatic silhouette—sooner or later in that sort of company it's a bit inevitable really". She claimed that her comfort with posing nude was due to the liberating influence of her mother, Margaret Ayrton, a Witch. She said "I suppose being brought up by hippies as parents, I had absolutely no problem being naked. The problems I had were actually wrestling with the whole sort of feminist thing. I tried to justify it to myself that there were loads of jobs that I thought were equally demeaning because they had such a low wage. When I waitressed, my take home pay was what I could earn in two hours modelling". She attributes her buxom figure to a combination of rigorous ballet-training and having Irish and Welsh ancestry.

== Playboy Playmate ==
Marina Baker

Playboy centerfold appearance
- March 1987
- Preceded by: Julie Peterson
- Succeeded by: Anna Clark

Personal details
- Born: 8 December 1967 (age 58) Windsor, Berkshire, England
- Height: 5 ft 7 in (1.70 m)

Baker was first approached to pose for Penthouse but turned them down and did her Playmate shoot in 1986 when she was 18. When the March 1987 issue of Playboy was released to newsstands she had only recently turned 19. In 1995 Baker wrote a lengthy article about her experiences as a Playmate for the London edition of Time Out magazine.

== Acting, journalism and writing career ==
Baker has appeared in two films: the 1987 TV movie Casanova, starring Richard Chamberlain, and the 1990 short film Man from China. She also acted in the musical Forever Elvis (in the role of Priscilla Beaulieu Presley), and played Nina in a stage production of Chekov's The Seagull. By this time, she got involved in fighting chemical factories, ran a campsite with a cafe, worked on a goat farm, looked after a child and ran a community theatre.

Following the death of a boyfriend she retired from acting and modeling while still in her early twenties and for a brief time went back to waitressing in England. Back home, she decided to further her education and completed a BA (Hons) in journalism from the London College of Printing and an MA in dramatic writing from the University of Sussex. She ended up doing work experience at the News of the World, before joining the London Evening Standard. During the 1990s, Baker worked extensively as a journalist, most often for The Independent, The Telegraph and The Guardian newspapers, as well as Punch, and Junior Magazine in the United Kingdom.

She is known today as a practising Wiccan and author of several children's books on Witchcraft, including Spells for the Witch in You; Spells for Teenage Witches: Get Your Way with Magical Power; Marina Baker's Teenage Survival Guide; and Spells for Cats (the last was published under the name Daisy Pepper). In 2001, she worked as a magic consultant for a BBC documentary about the Harry Potter books.

== Political career ==
Baker is active in local politics in the Lewes area of England, now working under her married name of Marina Pepper.

In 2006, she chaired the Lewes district council, where she represented the coastal communities of East Saltdean and Telscombe Cliffs, just five miles east of the cosmopolitan hub of Brighton in Sussex. She lost her seat on 3 May 2007 when she was defeated for re-election by the Conservatives.

She has also served as the mayoress of Telscombe and at the 2005 general election she stood for Parliament in the Brighton Kemptown constituency as a Liberal Democrat, but was unsuccessful. She has been quoted as saying, somewhat facetiously, "I'm not sure Page Three girls can become MPs".

Baker is active in a number of local environmentalist programs such as the Saltdean "walking bus", which accompanies a line of children to school, reducing the number of cars on the road and giving the children "a good bit of exercise" before school. She has also set up a community recycling scheme for a local preschool and ran eco-fairs to help promote understanding of sustainable living.

As a member of the Telscombe town council, she takes an active role in REGEN—part of the Local Strategic Partnership—where she organises projects to promote social economic and environmental well-being in the towns of Peacehaven, Telscombe and East Saltdean.

She organises regular REGEN events in the community, including "The Circle", a sustainability fair which has run in conjunction with Telscombe's Town fair, RANDOMfreeFEST—a youth festival in Peacehaven—and "Cool Yule", a seasonal market held at the beginning of the Christmas shopping season, promoting local food and gifts.

Marina also appeared in the 2011 documentary Just Do It on environmental activism.

In July 2013, she was arrested by police for obstruction when she joined a protest against fracking in Balcombe in West Sussex.

== Bibliography ==
- Spells for Teenage Witches. Kyle Cathie. October 2000. ISBN 1-85626-397-5.
- Spells for Teenage Witches: Get Your Way with Magical Power. Ulysses Press. December 2000. ISBN 1-56975-244-3.
- Spells for the Witch in You. Kyle Cathie. 31 October 2001. ISBN 1-85626-411-4.
- Spells for Cats, by 'Daisy Pepper' [i.e. Marina Baker] (G. Smith Publishers, ISBN 1-58685-142-X, February 2002)
- Marina Baker's Teenage Survival Guide: Everything You Need to Know About Life, Love and Caring for the Planet. Kyle Cathie. November 2002. ISBN 0-7607-4526-9.

== Appearances in Playboy ==
- Playboy (USA) March 1987, vol. 34, iss. 3, pp. 94–107, by: Byron Newman, "Playmate Of The Month: Great Briton". Playmate pictorial and data sheet.
- Playboy (USA) April 1987, vol. 34, iss. 4, pg. 129, by photographer Richard Fegley, "Here Comes Casanova".
- Playboy (USA) January 1988, vol. 35, iss. 1, pg. 162, by: n/a, "Playboy's Playmate Review". Features photograph of Miss Baker nude whilst wearing an Edwardian-style costume corset.
- Playboy (USA) August 1989, vol. 36, iss. 8, pp. 62–69, by: Photographer Byron Newman, "Off With Their Clothes!" Semi-nude pictorial featuring Miss Baker as Marie Antoinette.

Luann Lee	Julie Peterson	Marina Baker	Anna Clark	Kymberly Paige	Sandy Greenberg
Carmen Berg	Sharry Konopski	Gwen Hajek	Brandi Brandt	Pamela Stein	India Allen
