= Il est cinq heures, Paris s'éveille =

Single by Jacques Dutronc

from the album Il est cinq heures
- Released: March 1968
- Recorded: 1968
- Genre: French rock
- Length: 2:55
- Label: Disques Vogue
- Songwriter(s): Jacques Lanzmann, Anne Ségalen, Jacques Dutronc
- Producer(s): Unknown

Jacques Dutronc singles chronology
"La publicité" (1967)	"Il est cinq heures, Paris s'éveille" (1968)	"Le courrier du cœur" (1968)

"Il est cinq heures, Paris s'éveille" (French pronunciation: [il ɛ sɛ̃k œʁ paʁi sevɛj]; English: "It is five o'clock, Paris awakens") is the sixth single by the French singer-songwriter Jacques Dutronc, released in 1968. It appears on his second self-titled album (also known as Il est cinq heures).

In 1991, it was voted best French-language single of all time in a poll of music critics.

== Composition ==
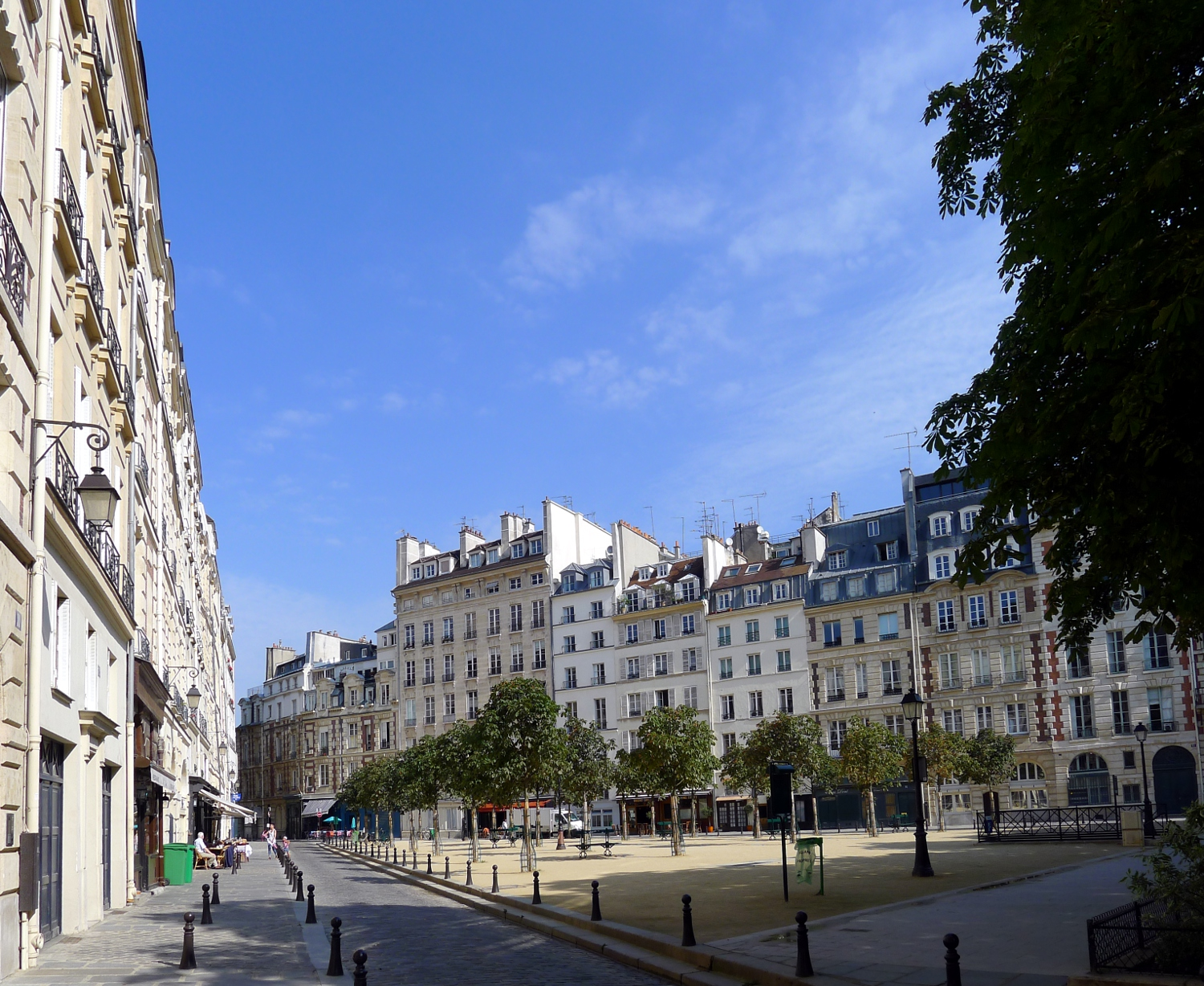
Place Dauphine, mentioned in the first line of the song.

The song originated from an idea put forward by Jacques Wolfsohn, an artistic director at Disques Vogue, during a meal at his home with songwriting partners Jacques Dutronc and Jacques Lanzmann. He suggested a song on the subject of Paris in the morning. The other two Jacques began writing the song at around 11 pm that evening, and completed it at daybreak. It takes inspiration from "Tableau de Paris à cinq heures du matin", an 1802 song by Marc-Antoine Madeleine Désaugiers.

The modernized lyrics replace Désaugiers' sunrise tableau of bakeries, fruitstands and street cleaners with a less soothing scene of trucks, cars and strippers. Familiar Parisian landmarks such as the Place Dauphine are reexamined for the 1960s; the grand railway station Gare Montparnasse is described as "no more than a carcass" ("...n'est plus qu'une carcasse...") because, at the time the song was written, it was in the process of demolition to make way for the Tour Montparnasse skyscraper.

The flute solo in the recording was added at the end of the session. Dutronc and Lanzmann were unhappy with the arrangement and felt that it lacked something. Dutronc had the idea of adding a manouche-style guitar part, but a flutist working elsewhere in the same building, Roger Bourdin, was asked to listen to the recording and agreed to improvise the short but evocative solos that appear after each sung line on the finished track.

The lyrics to the song are co-credited to Lanzmann's wife at the time, Anne Ségalen.

== Release and promotion ==
"Il est cinq heures, Paris s'éveille" was released as a four-track EP in France in March 1968.

Dutronc performed the song on the Office de Radiodiffusion Télévision Française television shows Tilt magazine, broadcast on 27 March 1968, and Palmarès des chansons, broadcast on 18 April 1968.

== Reception and legacy ==
On 23 March 1968, "Il est cinq heures, Paris s'éveille" was Dutronc's third single to reach number one on the French charts, where it stayed for one week. It also reached number two in Belgium and number four in The Netherlands.

Although the song was not intended to be political, its refrain of "Paris s'éveille" ("Paris awakens") was adopted by protesters during the events of May 68. A few weeks after the song's release and the day before the song reached number one, the first campus occupation at Paris X University Nanterre began. It has since been described as a "hymn" to those events. A re-written version was mimeographed and sung at the barricades. The song was withdrawn from the playlists of most radio stations. It was quickly adapted by the protest singer Jacques Le Glou, with new verses depicting a city of overturned Peugeots and dead policemen.

In 1991, "Il est cinq heures, Paris s'éveille" was voted the best French-language single of all time in a poll of music critics organised by Le Nouvel Observateur for a TV special broadcast on Antenne 2. Jacques Brel's "Ne me quitte pas" landed second place in the same poll.

Rock critic Thierry Coljon describes Dutronc's song as "one of the most beautiful there is".

== Cover versions ==
The song has been covered by Sylvie Vartan, Patrick Genet, Ange, Zaz, Dominique Grange (Le Glou's version) and An Pierlé.

== Track listing ==
Words by Jacques Lanzmann and Anne Ségalen, music by Jacques Dutronc.

=== Side A ===
No.	Title	Length
1.	"Il est cinq heures, Paris s'éveille"	02:55
2.	"L'augmentation"	02:31

=== Side B ===
No.	Title	Length
1.	"Comment elles dorment"	03:09
2.	"Fais pas ci, fais pas ça"	01:40
