= Nude (2017 American film) =

- Promotional poster
- Release date: October 29, 2017
- Country: United States
- Language: English

Nude is a 2017 American documentary film about a talent search and Pirelli Calendar-inspired fine art nude calendar production named NU Muses.

== Cast ==
According to the official NU Muses website, the models (and their country affiliations) are

- Alejandra Guilmant (Mexico),
- Anna Wolf (United States),
- Ariela Oliveira (Brazil),
- Ebonee Davis (United States),
- Isabella Boemeke (Brazil),
- Janine Tugonon (Philippines),
- Jessica Clements (United States),
- Keilani Asmus (Holland/Indonesia),
- Nidhi Sunil (India),
- Rachel Cook (United States),
- Sabina Karlsson (Sweden), and
- Vika Levina (Russia).

== History ==
On August 12, 2016, treats!'s founder, Steve Shaw and French photographer David Bellemere, announced a global model search to discover a new generation of 12 female models that would serve as the subject of its NU MUSES calendar project. The talent search had live casting in New York City and Los Angeles and website submissions in August 2016. The calendar launch was scheduled to occur during an art gallery exhibition of 24 photographs by Bellemere at Art Basel Miami in December 2016. The production was to be featured as a 90-minute documentary film to be released on American network television and worldwide. On October 11, 2016, the twelve NU Muses were named.

As early as November 22, 2016, the calendar was available for purchase. On November 29, 2016, Starz Inc. greenlighted NUDE as a feature-length documentary film directed and produced by award-winning Anthony B. Sacco and Josh Shader that examines "perceptions of modeling, nude photography, and body image" in the modern social media age. The work reveals Shaw's casting for the creation of the inaugural NU Muses project. The subjects are a group of working professional models who are photographed by Bellemere. The film also presents Shaw's creative and business aspirations. The photography, which was inspired by Pirelli Calendars from the 1970s, took place in the Dominican Republic.

On September 14, 2017, Starz released the official movie trailer in anticipation of the October 29, 2017 movie premiere for NUDE. The release clarified the film would be available in both download and streaming formats at the video-on-demand Starz On Demand service and through the Starz app.
