= Morice Benin =

Moroccan-born French singer-songwriter (1947–2021)

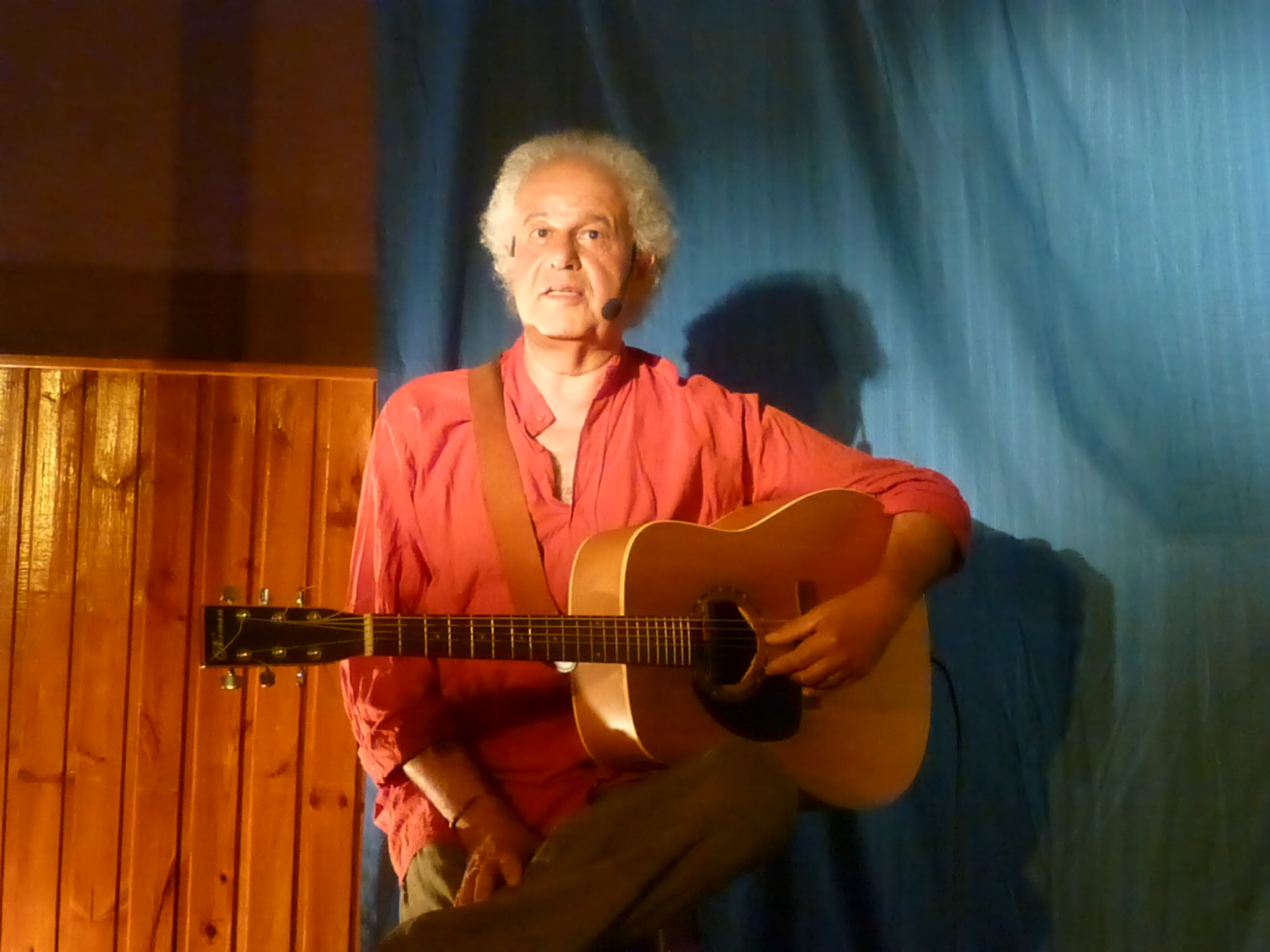
- Benin in 2015
- Born: Moïse Ben-Haïm; 21 July 1947; Casablanca, French Morocco
- Died: 19 January 2021 (aged 73); Die, France
- Occupation: Singer-Songwriter

Morice Benin, born Moïse Ben-Haïm (21 July 1947 – 19 January 2021) was a French singer-songwriter.

== Biography ==
Moïse Ben-Haïm was born in Casablanca on 21 July 1947. His family shortly thereafter moved to France and francized the family named to Benin. Therefore, he took the name Maurice. He again changed his first name to "Morice" for his singing career.

Morice Benin died in Die on 19 January 2021 at the age of 73.

== Discography ==
=== Studio albums ===
- Peut-être (1972)
- Il faudrait toujours pénétrer les gens… (1973)
- Je vis (1974)
- Peut-être (1975)
- C'était en … (1976)
- Tu vois c'que j'veux dire (1978)
- Passage (1980)
- Apocalypse (1981)
- Sémaphore (1982)
- Aimer sans issue (1983)
- Chants de solitude (1984)
- Chemin d'Alliance (1985)
- Escale (1987)
- Respirer (1988)
- La Cinquième Saison (1990)
- Essentiel (1991)
- Funambule amoureux (1996)
- La vie à tous (1999)
- Vie Vent (2000)
- Breizh ardente (2001)
- In'spir (2001)
- Après le déluge (2002)
- La Mémoire et la Mer (2003)
- Être (2005)
- Pour prendre le large (2008)
- Atteindre (2009)
- L'Élan (2009)
- Arpenteurs (2009)
- Des astres annoncés (2012)
- Infiniment (2014)
- L'Inespéré, entre les lignes… (2017)
- L'air de rien (2018)
- Juste l'heure (2020)

=== Compilations ===
- De je vis… en escale (1988)
- Des pays…à ...respirer (1991)
- Je chante…pour demain (1995)
- Comme un fleuve (1998)
- Ose…la petite vie (1998)
- Chanter… souffle d'homme (2003)

=== EPs ===
- Rage de dents (1969)
- Maurice Benin Chante (1972)
- Résister (1987)
- Dessine moi un enfant (1987)
- Couleurs (1991)
- Ici Terre (1995)
- Différents (1998)
- Je vais vous dire un secret (2001)
- Florilège (2008)

== Awards ==
- Prize of the Académie Charles Cros (1985)
