= David Bellemere =

French photographer

- Born: 1972 (age 53–54); Paris, France
- Occupation: Photographer

David Bellemere (born in 1972) is a French beauty photographer.

== Life and career ==
David Bellemere began photography in school. His interest led him to study at an art school in Paris. While in college, Bellemere was commissioned by several French magazines for his work. After graduation, he traveled all over Asia for two years. During this time, he focused on using natural light, architecture, and fashion.

His work is recognized for the use of unique lighting, colours, and composition.

His work for a Nude Muses calendar named NU Muses is depicted in the 2017 documentary film Nude.

== Sexual misconduct ==
In 2018, Bellemere was accused by several models of sexual misconduct in an investigation by the Boston Globe. In 2020, ex-model Loulou Robert accused him of rape in her book Zone Grise.
