= Aslan (artist) =

French painter, sculptor and pin-up artist (1930–2014)

- Born: Alain Gourdon; 23 May 1930; Bordeaux, France
- Died: 11 February 2014 (aged 83); Sainte-Adèle, Quebec, Canada
- Known for: Pin-up art; sculpture

Aslan (born Alain Gourdon; 23 May 1930 in Bordeaux, France – 11 February 2014 in Sainte-Adèle, Quebec, Canada) was a French painter, sculptor and pin-up artist. He is mostly known in France for his pin ups. He contributed to Lui from the creation of the magazine in 1964 to the early eighties, providing a monthly pin-up.

Aslan was a French Postwar and Contemporary artist. He is the sculptor of Dalida's funerary statue on her tomb from 1987, and her bronze bust that was erected on Place Dalida in 1997. He also sculpted the Fifth Republic Marianne as Brigitte Bardot in 1970, followed by the Mireille Mathieu Marianne.
