= Juliette (French singer) =

French singer, songwriter and composer

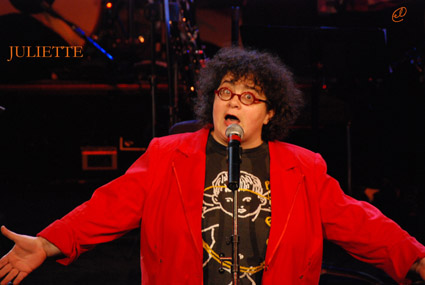
Juliette Noureddine

Juliette Noureddine, better known by her stage name of Juliette, is a French singer, songwriter and composer.

== Biography ==
She was born on 25 September 1962 in the 17th arrondissement of Paris. Her grandfather, of Algerian origin, arrived in France during the 1920s. Her father, Jacques Noureddine, played the saxophone. Juliette began to learn to play the piano at the young age of seven. Juliette had her beginnings in Toulouse; after spending her teenage years in a religious institute, and after passing through the faculties of Literature and Musicology, she started playing in bars and restaurants throughout Toulouse as a pianist, performing songs by Jacques Brel and Édith Piaf. It was around the age of 18 that Juliette began to write and sing. Her first song was entitled "This evening I'm sleeping with Chopin." One evening, Juliette sang a song accompanied by the piano in a bar in Toulouse. The boss quickly hired her, and she sang there every evening for a year and a half.

In 1985 and 1986, she was present at the festival Découvertes du Printemps in Bourges, a festival that features promising young talents. After a tour in Germany, she played the opening act for Jean Guidoni in 1990. It was at this time that she had a meeting with Pierre Philippe. She received the grand prix de la chanson française at Saarbrücken.

In 1991, she published her first album, Que Tal?. She received a nomination for the award of "Victories of Music" ("Victoires de la Musique") in 1994, and received the prize of "revelation of the year" at the same awards in 1997. She appeared at l'Olympia for the first time in 1999 for six days, and again for two days in 2005.

She has released seven albums and received the medal of Chevalier des Arts et Lettres. She hosts a radio show at the France Musique, called Juliette ou La clef des sons, in which she presents a selection of music spanning multiple genres, including pop and classical.

== Members of the group ==
- Bruno Grare is the oldest member to work with Juliette. He plays the vibraphone, marimba, percussions and the trombone. He is the brother of Denis Grare, who plays with Bénabar.
- Didier Bégon is the guitarist (classic and jazz), bassist, and backup singer of the group. He met Juliette in 1998 and later became a member of the group.
- Karim Medjebeur plays the piano, percussions, and the bagpipe, along with a few other instruments. He is a backup singer and a dancer for Juliette (solo in the song "Lucy").
- Franck Steckar plays the marimba, accordion, percussions, piano and also sings. Along with Grare, he has been a member of the band since 1993.
- Phillipe Brohet plays the clarinet, bass clarinet, flute, alto sax, and baritone. He has been playing with Juliette since 1998.
- Christophe Devillers plays the bass, the double bass and sings in the chorus. He is a recent addition to the group, joining in 2005 and has only worked with Juliette on her latest album Mutatis Mutandis.

== Discography ==
=== Studio albums ===
- 1993: Irrésistible
- 1996: Rimes féminines
- 1998: Assassins sans couteaux
- 2002: Le Festin de Juliette
- 2005: Mutatis Mutandis
- 2008: Bijoux et Babioles
- 2011: No parano
- 2013: Nour
- 2018: J'aime pas la chanson

=== Live albums ===
- 1987: Juliette
- 1991: ¿Que tal?
- 1995: Juliette chante aux Halles
- 1998: Deux pianos, with Didier Goret
- 2005: Fantasie Heroïque (DVD) Concert au Grand Rex 2005

=== Compilations ===
- 2000: Chansons et Rimes (specially edited for Quebec)
- 2003: Ma vie mon œuvre (vol.1) – vingt ans, vingt chansons
- 2014: Double best of – double vinyle lp
- 2016: Intégrale

== Awards ==
- Awards of the French Song on Sarrebruck (1990)
- Les Victoires de la musique "Female Revelation of the year" (1997)
- Les Victoires de la musique "Female Artist of the Year" (2006)

== Filmography ==
Year	Title	Role	Director	Notes
2002	Carnage	Monica	Delphine Gleize	
2003	L'année de mes sept ans	Simone	Irène Jouannet	TV movie
2009	Écrire pour un chanteur	Diane	Julien Lecat	TV series (1 episode)
2010	Profilage	Dr Dunez	Christophe Lamotte	TV series (1 episode)
2015	Chefs	Angélique	Arnaud Malherbe	TV series (3 episodes)
