= Les Ours du Scorff =

Les Ours du Scorff (The Bears of Scorff) are a mainly Breton folk group with a generally young audience.

The singers Gilbert Bourdin and Laurent Jouin formed the group with the encouragement of the producer of their first album, on which the group was called Gigi Bourdin et la Rouchta, although the album's title, Les Ours du Scorff, has become their better-known name.

Singers of traditional music at heart, they have surrounded themselves with instrumentalists well known on the Breton folk scene: Fanch Landreau, Soïg Sibéril, Jacques Yves Réhault, and others.

Their music melds Breton, Cajun, and Irish traditions. Their lyrics may bring to mind those of Boby Lapointe, Pierre Perret, or poets such as Norge, all this without sacrificing too much for the simplicity demanded of music for children.

== Discography ==
- 1994 Les Ours du Scorff (The Bears of Scorff)
- 1995 La Maison des bisous (The House of Kisses)
- 1998 Le grand Bal (The Grand Ball)
- 2000 Le Retour d'Oné (Oné's Return)
- 2002 Le plus-mieux (compilation)
