= Lui =

French adult-entertainment magazine

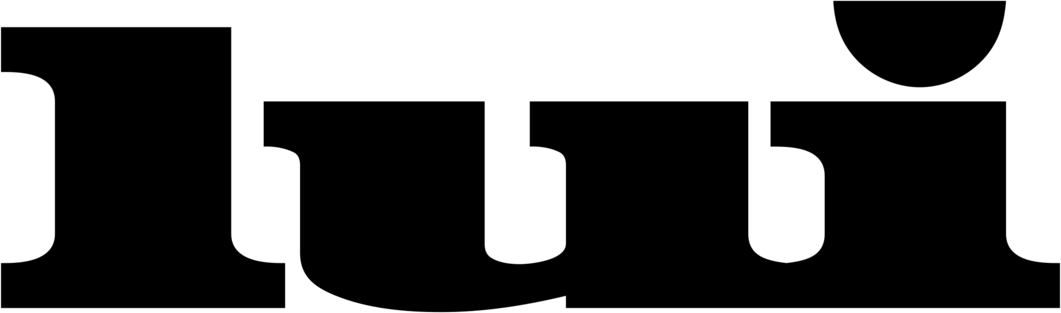

- Cover of the August 1983 issue, featuring Valérie Kaprisky by Raoul Ahoup
- Categories: Adult entertainment
- Founder: Daniel Filipacchi; Jacques Lanzmann; Frank Ténot
- First issue: November 1963
- Company: Kanra Publishing
- Country: France
- Based in: Paris
- Language: French
- Website: luimagazine.fr

Lui (French: [lɥi]; lit. 'Him') (stylised in all caps) is a French monthly adult-entertainment magazine. It was published in various iterations in Paris between 1963 and 2020. The magazine relaunched in 2026 under the direction of Éric Naulleau.

The first iteration was relaunched in 1987, the second iteration ceased publication in 1994, the third iteration was published as Le Nouveau Lui between 1995 and 1997, the fourth between 2001 and 2007, and finally in its fifth iteration the magazine was relaunched in 2013 as a high-end adult entertainment magazine.

== Background ==
Lui is a French adult entertainment magazine founded in 1963 by Daniel Filipacchi, Jacques Lanzmann, and Frank Ténot as Lui (1963 to 1987; 1987 to 1994; 2001 to 2007; 2013 to 2020; 2026 to present) and briefly as Le Nouveau Lui from 1995 to 1997.

The magazine was a monthly publication from 1963 to 1992, then bi-monthly from 1993 to 1994, monthly from 1995 to 1997, sporadically from 2001 to 2007, monthly from 2013 to 2017 (ten times per year), and finally as a quarterly from 2017 to 2020; published four times per year for Spring, Summer, Autumn, and Winter.

=== Editors ===
Editor-in-Chief	Start year	End year
Jacques Lanzmann	1963	1968
Marcel Duhamel		
Stéphane de Rosnay	1989	1990
Brice Couturier	1990	1992
Bruno Godard	2018	2020
Éric Naulleau	2025	present

=== International editions ===
- Lui (for Italy; 1970–1986?)
- Oui (for the United States; 1972–2007)
- Lui Brasil (for Brazil; 1976–?)
- Lui Español (for Spain; 1977–1981)
- Lui Deutsche Ausgabe (for Germany; 1977–1990)
- Lui Japon (for Japan; 1982–2010)

== Lui published by Filipacchi group (1963–1994) ==
=== First series (1963–1987) ===
This magazine's successful recipe was combining content with in-depth articles and attractive naked women, featuring many B-List but also celebrities, often prominent French actresses, such as Brigitte Bardot, Mireille Darc, Jane Birkin or Marlène Jobert.

It featured a monthly pin-up by Aslan. The first girl to pose on the cover was Valérie Lagrange (the number 1 appeared on 11 January 1963) photographed by Francis Giacobetti, future director of the soft-core movie Emmanuelle 2.

The magazine hosted also a cartoon by Lauzier: Les Sextraordinaires Aventures de Zizi et Peter Panpan. Among the first collaborators are Jean-Louis Bory, René Chateau, Philippe Labro, Francis Dumoulin, Francis Giacobetti, Siné, Michel Mardore, Gilles Sandier and many others.

The magazine motto was Lui, le magazine de l'homme moderne (The Magazine of the Modern Man). In the beginning, it had also a mascot, a cat's head, similarly to the magazine Playboy Bunny, but it disappeared in the early 1970s.

=== Second series (1987–1994) ===
The second series was published by the Filipacchi group from 1987 to 1994. It has been published 69 numbers. Its editor was Stéphane de Rosnay in 1989, Brice Couturier 1990 to 1992.

Initially, its specificity (compared to the first series) was that it was published in a two separate books, but from number 27, "Lui" returned to be a single book magazine with the new slogan "Le magazine de l'homme civilisé" (The Magazine of civilized man).

The circulation that was in early 1980 of 350,000 copies dropped to 70,000 copies in 1993. In early 1993, the magazine abandoned the monthly release and became bimonthly. The Filipacchi group stopped publication in June 1994.

== Lui published by Michel Birnbaum (1995–2010) ==
=== Le Nouveau Lui (1995–1997) ===
The title was used again from 1995 to 1997 (14 issues) and named Le Nouveau Lui by Michel Birnbaum, a radiotherapist physician turned publisher as founder and owner of the holding company Altinea, specializing in magazines about vintage cars. The goal was to return to the roots (and success) of the original publication, intending a more glamour-oriented publication. The coverage of the first issue was dedicated to Miss Agnes. The magazine was again released as a monthly issue and the design of the title was upgraded. For the first time, the cover picture was devoted to one man alone, without an accompanying female model. This attempt to revive the magazine failed, with the final issue published in February 1997 with Eva Herzigová as the cover girl.

=== Lui pornographic magazine (2001–2010) ===
The magazine published quarterly from 2001 to 2010 had a pornographic nature. Its slogan was "L'officiel de la photo de charme" or (as on the online edition) "Le charme des filles d'aujourd hui." It was published by the company 1633, whose president and sole shareholder was Michel Birnbaum. Patrick Guérinet was the managing editor until July 2010, when he was succeeded by Francis Guillebon.

== Lui published by Jean-Yves Le Fur (2013–2020) ==
The magazine was relaunched in 2013 with Léa Seydoux as its first cover girl. Its editor-in-chief was Frédéric Beigbeder. In March 2017, the magazine went from monthly to quarterly and Frédéric Taddeï succeeded Frédéric Beigbeder as its editor-in-chief. Covergirls since the first issue have (as of January 2016) included Rihanna, Gisele Bundchen, Rita Ora, Monica Bellucci, Alessandra Ambrosio, Virginie Ledoyen, Naomi Campbell, Kate Moss, Jourdan Dunn, Carolyn Murphy, Joan Smalls, and others. With the exception of Bellucci who appeared semi-clothed, all have appeared topless or fully naked inside their issues.

== Lui under Jean-Christophe Florentin (2026–present) ==
The magazine returned in 2026 with a cover featuring Brigitte Bardot.

== See also ==
- List of Lui magazine cover models
