= Francis Giacobetti =

French photographer and film director (1939–2025)

- Born: 1 July 1939; Marseille, France
- Died: 7 June 2025 (aged 85)
- Education: College of Juilly
- Occupations: Photographer; Film director

Francis Giacobetti (1 July 1939 – 7 June 2025) was a French photographer and film director.

== Life and career ==
Born in Marseille on 1 July 1939, Giacobetti studied at the College of Juilly. At the age of 18, he discovered photography and was hired as an assistant to Maurice Tabard, then head of the photography studio at Marie Claire magazine. He then completed apprenticeships with various other notable photographers, including Pierre Balmain, Madame Grès, and Elsa Schiaparelli. From 1970 to 1971, he was the photographer for the Pirelli Calendar.

In 1975, Giacobetti directed the film Emmanuelle 2 and he produced Emmanuelle 4 in 1984. In 1987, he fathered a child, Louis Giacobetti, with Carole Bouquet.

Giacobetti died on 7 June 2025, at the age of 85.

== Books ==
- Les filles du Crazy (1982)
- Francis Giacobetti (1987)
- Giacobetti, Écrire avec de la lumière (1994)
- Francis Bacon by Francis Giacobetti (2005)
- Instantanés (2017)
- Giacobetti : nus (2017)

== Expositions ==
- Vier Meister der erotischen Fotografie (1970)
- Francis Bacon by Francis Giacobetti (1994)
- Zebras (2012)
- Haskins, Giacobetti, Shinoyama: Three Masters of Erotic Photography (2017)
- Giacobetti (2017)
