= Larry Portis =

American historian (1943–2011)

Larry Lee Portis (July 3, 1943 in Bremerton, Washington – June 4, 2011 in Soudorgues, France) was a politically progressive historian and university professor. He was the author or co-author of a dozen books and editor or co-editor of others. His work includes histories of political thought, social movements, US foreign policy, and popular culture (music and cinema) in the United States and Europe. He lived in France since 1977 and died on June 4, 2011.

== Biography ==
Larry Portis grew up in a working-class family in Seattle, Washington and Billings, Montana. His father was a sheet metal worker and city fireman. His mother was an occasional secretary. At the age of 18 he married and quickly had two children. In 1968 he graduated from Montana State University Billings where he was active in university and local politics, wrote (1965–68) weekly articles on politics for the university newspaper (The Retort) and created an underground newspaper (The Free Student Press) in addition to working for a living. Before leaving the area he participated in organizing the municipal water workers in Billings. He received a master's degree (1970) and a Ph.D. (1975) in history from Northern Illinois University. In 1974 he participated in support work for the United Farm Workers’ Union, before leaving the university and working at a variety of occupations. He left for Europe in 1977 where he traveled and did odd jobs. In 1981 he began teaching at the American University of Paris, where he created a section of CGT labor union, and then in several other universities in France. He was a member (1984–89) of the editorial collective of the Editions Spartacus, created and directed by René Lefeuvre. Portis was a member of the editorial committee of the sociology journal L’Homme et la Société from 1987 to 2007. In 2002, he co-founded the group “Americans for Peace and Justice” in Montpellier, France. He has written many articles for a variety of newspapers, magazines and journals including Alternative Libertaire, Gavroche, Radical History Review, The Industrial Worker, Le Monde Libertaire, l’Homme et la Société, and Film International, and for on-line magazines such as CounterPunch, Watan, Political Film Blog and Divergences.be. Portis has also written and published short stories—some of them published in Intimacies: Nine Tales of Love and Other Emotions, and a novel: American Dreaming. His second novel, Higher Learning, is in progress. He lived in Paris and in the south of France with the author and radio journalist Christiane Passevant.

== University employment ==
Portis taught the history of Europe and the United States and sociology at the American University of Paris from 1981 to 1996. He taught the history of the United States at the University of Paris 7 (Jussieu) from 1983 to 1988), at the University of Paris 10 (Nanterre) from 1988 to 1989, and at the University of Clermont-Ferrand 2 from 1995 to 1998. At the University of Montpellier III from 1998 to 2009 he taught in both the American studies program and in the Mediterranean studies program.

== Books ==
- Georges Sorel, London, Pluto Press, 1980. 120p. German translation: Sorel zur Einführung, Hannover, SOAK-verlag, 1983 (translation by Frieder Otto Wolf, postface by Peter Schöttler).
- Georges Sorel, présentation et textes choisis, Paris, François Maspero, 1982 (translation of the presentation by Martine Echard and Christiane Passevant). New edition by La Brèche PEC, Montreuil, 1989.
- IWW. Le syndicalisme révolutionnaire aux États-Unis, Paris, Editions Spartacus, 1985 and 2003.
- Les Classes sociales en France. Un débat inachevé (1789–1989), Paris, Les Editions Ouvrières, 1988.
- La Main de fer en Palestine. Histoire et actualité de la lutte dans les territoires occupés, (with Christiane Passevant) Paris, Editions du Monde Libertaire, 1992.
- Dictionnaire Black, (with Christiane Passevant) Paris, Éditions Jacques Grancher, 1995.
- La politique étrangère des États-Unis. De la guerre mondiale à la mondialisation (with Michel Allner), Paris, Éditions Éllipse, 2000.
- Soul Trains: A Peoples' History of Popular Music in the United States and Britain, College Station, Virtualbookworm, 2002.
- Cinéma engagé Cinéma enragé, (Editor with Pascal Dupuy et Christiane Passevant), Paris, Editions l’Harmattan, 2003.
- French Frenzies : A Social History of Popular Music in France, College Station, Virtualbookworm, 2004.
- La Canaille ! Histoire sociale de la chanson française, Paris, Editions CNT, 2004.
- Dictionnaire des chansons politiques et engagées, (with Christiane Passevant) Paris, Éditions Scali, 2008.
- Histoire du fascisme aux Etats-Unis, Paris, Éditions CNT-RP, 2008.
- Terror and Its Representations: Studies in Social History and Cultural Expression in the United States and Beyond. (Editor) Montpellier, Presses Universitaires de la Méditerranée, 2008.
- Qu’est-ce que le fascisme ? Un phénomène social d’hier et d’aujourd’hui, Paris, Éditions Alternative Libertaire, 2010.

== Articles ==
- “The Cultural Dialectic of the Blues,” Canadian Journal of Political and Social Theory, 9 (3), autumn 1985, pp. 23–36.
- “Critique de Buhle,” l'Homme et la société, 3 (93), 1989, pp. 27–32.
- “Le syndrome Tarzan. L'émancipation et la domestication de l'être humain,” L'Homme et la Société, numéros 132-133, April–September 1999, pp. 13–28. And http://divergences.be/spip.php?article1193
- “Gesellschaft,” in Historisch-kritisches Wörterbuch des Marxismus, sous la direction de Wolfgang Fritz Haug, volume 5, Berlin, Augument-Verlag, 2001, pp. 545–564. In English as “What is Society?,” http://divergences.be/spip.php?article1193
- “The Director Who Must (Not) Be Forgotten: Elio Petri and the legacy of Italian political cinema," Film International, 44, vol. 8, no. 2, 2010, http://filmint.nu/p=2448.
