= Golf-Drouot =

Coordinates: 48.8719°N 2.3404°E

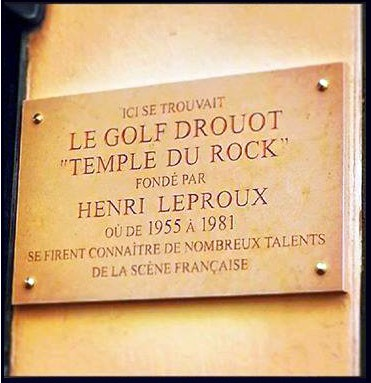
Plaque located at the bottom of the Golf-Drouot staircase.

The Golf-Drouot was a nightclub located in the 9th arrondissement of Paris. It began its life in 1955 as a tea room with a miniature golf course, hence its name, and in 1961 became a nightclub. With increased popularity the club hosted notable artists such as Free, David Bowie and The Who. The club closed in 1981.
