= Jacques Dutronc =

French musician and actor (born 1943)

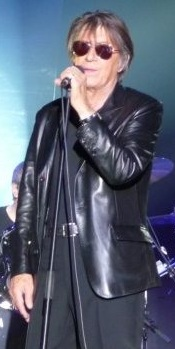
- Dutronc in Lorient, France in January 2010

Background information
- Born: 28 April 1943 (age 83); Paris, France
- Genres: French pop; French rock; chanson; yé-yé; garage rock; psychedelic rock
- Occupations: singer-songwriter; actor
- Instruments: Guitar; vocals
- Years active: 1961–present
- Labels: Disques Vogue; Columbia Records
- Formerly of: El Toro et les Cyclones
- Spouse: Françoise Hardy (m. 1981; sep. 1988) (Note: Dutronc and Hardy remained legally married until Hardy's death in 2024, although they had been separated since 1988.)
- Award: Honorary César (2005)

Jacques Dutronc (French pronunciation: [ʒak dytʁɔ̃]; born 28 April 1943) is a French singer, songwriter, guitarist, composer, and actor. Some of Dutronc's best-known hits include "Il est cinq heures, Paris s'éveille" (which AllMusic has called "his finest hour"), "Le Responsable", and "Les Cactus".

Dutronc played guitar in the rock group El Toro et les Cyclones. He wrote successful songs for singer Françoise Hardy in the 1960s before moving on to pursue a successful solo career. His music incorporated traditional French pop and French rock as well as styles such as psychedelic and garage rock. He was also very important in the yéyé music movement and has been a longtime songwriting collaborator with Jacques Lanzmann. According to AllMusic, Dutronc is "one of the most popular performers in the French-speaking world", although he "remains little known in English speaking territories" aside from a cult following in the UK.

Dutronc later branched out into film acting, starting in 1973. He earned a César Award for Best Actor for the leading role in Van Gogh (1991), which was directed by Maurice Pialat. He married Hardy in 1981 and together they have a son, guitarist Thomas Dutronc (born 1973); the couple separated in 1988, but never divorced.

== Early life ==
Jacques Dutronc was born on 28 April 1943 at 67 Rue de Provence in the 9th arrondissement of Paris, the home of his parents, Pierre and Madeleine, during the German occupation. His father was a manager for the state-run Office of Coal Distribution. Jacques was educated at Rocroy-Saint-Léon elementary school (now a lycée), the École de la Rue Blanche (now a drama school), and then at the École Professionnelle de Dessin Industriel, where he studied graphic design from 1959.

== Career ==
=== 1960s ===
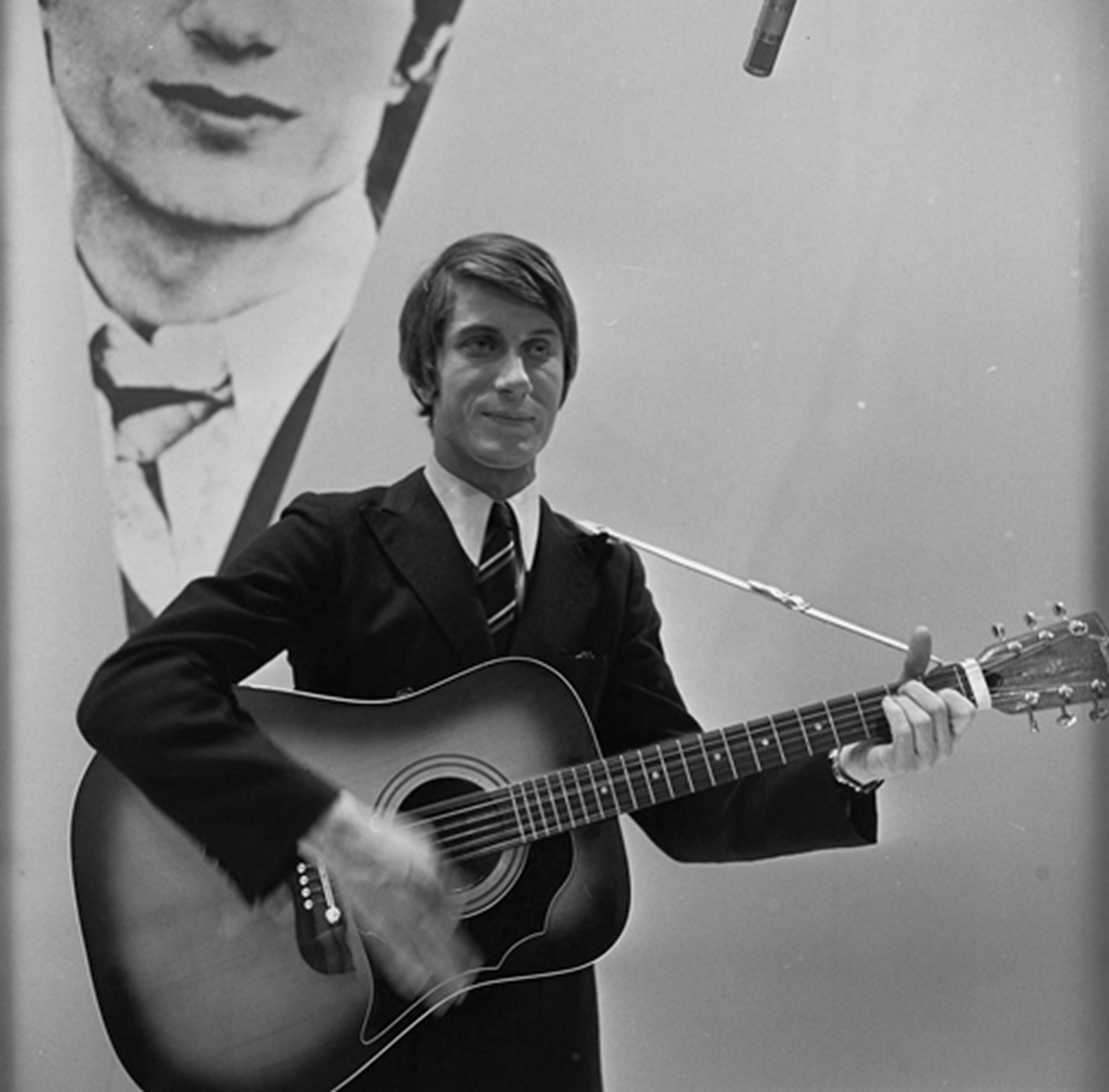
Dutronc performing on Dutch TV in 1966

In 1960, Dutronc formed a band with himself as guitarist, schoolfriend Hadi Kalafate as bassist, Charlot Bénaroch as drummer (later replaced with André Crudot), and Daniel Dray as singer. They auditioned in 1961 for Jacques Wolfsohn, an artistic director at Disques Vogue, who signed them and gave them the name El Toro et les Cyclones. The group released two singles, "L'Oncle John" and "Le Vagabond", but disbanded when Dutronc was obliged to undertake military service.

After being discharged from the army in 1963, Dutronc briefly played guitar in Eddy Mitchell's backing band and was also given a job at Vogue as Jacques Wolfsohn's assistant. In this capacity, he co-wrote songs for artists such as ZouZou, Cléo, and Françoise Hardy.

Wolfsohn asked Dutronc to work with Jacques Lanzmann, a novelist and editor of Lui magazine, to create songs for a beatnik singer called Benjamin. Benjamin released an EP in 1966, featuring songs written with Dutronc and a Lanzmann–Dutronc composition, "Cheveux longs" ("Long Hair"). However, Wolfsohn was disappointed by Benjamin's recording of a song titled "Et moi, et moi, et moi". A second version was recorded, with Dutronc's former bandmate Hadi Kalafate on vocals. Wolfsohn then asked Dutronc if he would be interested in recording his own version. The single reached number 2 in the French charts in September 1966.

Cultural historian Larry Portis describes the arrival of Dutronc on the French music scene, along with that of Michel Polnareff at around the same time, as representing "the first French rock music that can be considered a musically competent and non-imitative incorporation of African-American and African-American-British influences". For Portis, Dutronc marks a break with the literary tradition of French chanson in his creative use of the sounds, rather than just the syntax, of the language.

Dutronc's self-titled debut album, released at the end of 1966, sold over a million copies and was awarded a special Grand Prix du Disque by the Académie Charles Cros, in memoriam of one of its founders. A second single, "Les play boys", spent six weeks at number one and sold 600,000 copies.

Dutronc was one of the most commercially successful French music stars of the late 1960s and early 1970s. During that period, he released seven hit albums and more than 20 singles, including two further number ones: "J'aime les filles" in 1967 and "Il est cinq heures, Paris s'éveille" in 1968.

According to music critic Mark Deming: "Dutronc's early hits were rough but clever exercises in European garage rock ... like Dutronc's role models Bob Dylan and Ray Davies, he could write melodies strong enough to work even without their excellent lyrics, and his band had more than enough energy to make them fly (and the imagination to move with the musical times as psychedelia and hard rock entered the picture at the end of the decade)".

=== 1970s ===
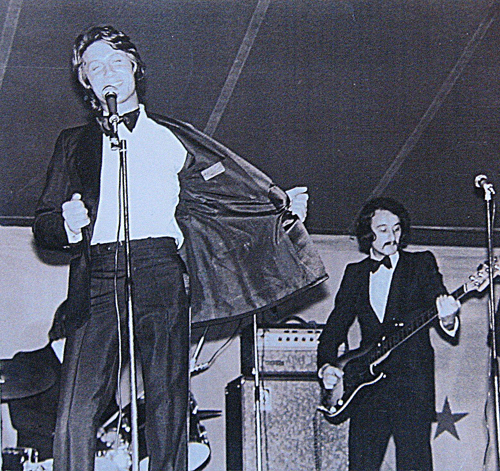
Dutronc performing in Annecy in 1971. Also pictured is bassist Noël Mirol.

Most of Dutronc's songs up to 1975 were written with Jacques Lanzmann, with only two written solely by Dutronc. Lanzmann's wife Anne Ségalen is also credited on some songs. Dutronc wrote three songs with comic-book writer Fred, whose stories he also narrated for commercial release in 1970. Two songs were written in 1971 by Lanzmann, Franck Harvel, and composer Jean-Pierre Bourtayre for a TV adaptation of Arsène Lupin. Co-writing credits on Dutronc's self-titled 1975 album are split between Lanzmann, Serge Gainsbourg, and Jean-Loup Dabadie.

In 1973, "Et moi, et moi, et moi" was adapted with English lyrics as "Alright Alright Alright" and became a UK No. 3 hit for the group Mungo Jerry.

Also in 1973, Dutronc began a second career as an actor in the film Antoine et Sébastien, directed by Jean-Marie Périer. Dutronc's second film, That Most Important Thing: Love, directed by Andrzej Żuławski, was a major box-office hit in France. In the following years, Dutronc devoted most of his energies toward his acting career, appearing in films directed by Jean-Luc Godard, Claude Lelouch, and Maurice Pialat. In 1977, he was nominated for the César Award for Best Supporting Actor for his role in Claude Sautet's Mado.

Steven Spielberg reportedly considered Dutronc to be the best French actor of his generation, and had the role of René Belloq in Raiders of the Lost Ark written with him in mind. Dutronc was not given the role, however, because it transpired that his English was not adequate.

=== 1980s ===
In 1980, Dutronc began work on a new album under the direction of Jacques Wolfsohn, now an executive at Gaumont Musique. Wolfsohn proposed that Dutronc write with both Jacques Lanzmann and Serge Gainsbourg. During recording, Wolfsohn proposed to Lanzmann and Gainsbourg that they each work on alternative lyrics to go with one of Dutronc's instrumental demos. Lanzmann objected to being placed in competition against another writer and dropped out of the project. The resulting album, Guerre et pets ("War and Farts" – a play on the title of Tolstoy's novel), consequently includes only two Lanzmann–Dutronc compositions and is mainly written by Dutronc and Gainsbourg. The album's lead single, "L'hymne à l'amour", received little airplay because its lyric consists primarily of racial epithets (the opening line, roughly translated, is "gook, wog, towel-head, yid"), and the album was only a moderate commercial success. The follow-up, 1982's C'est pas du bronze, was written with Anne Ségalen, by now divorced from Jacques Lanzmann, and was released to a frosty critical reception.

Dutronc's acting career continued during the 1980s, and he appeared in films such as Malevil and Barbet Schroeder's Cheaters (Tricheurs). In 1987, he released a further album, C.Q.F.Dutronc. Most of the songs were written by Dutronc without a partner, although he collaborated with Étienne Daho on one track and with Jean-François Bernardini of the Corsican folk group I Muvrini on another.

=== 1990s ===
In 1992, Dutronc was awarded the César for Best Actor for the title role in Maurice Pialat's biographical film Van Gogh. Critic Christopher Null commented that Dutronc "manages to embody the obvious manic depression from Van Gogh's later years, all exuding from his scraggly face, sunken eyes, and bony frame... the searing Dutronc is the real reason to sit through the film".

In November 1992, Dutronc played three comeback concerts at the Casino de Paris, highlights from which were released as a film directed by Jean-Marie Périer and as a live album, Dutronc au Casino. At around this time, Dutronc began work on a new studio album, Brèves rencontres, but work progressed slowly and it was not released until 1995.

During the 1990s, Dutronc appeared in two films by Patrick Grandperret and was nominated for a César Award for Best Supporting Actor in 1999, for his role in Nicole Garcia's Place Vendôme.

=== 21st century ===
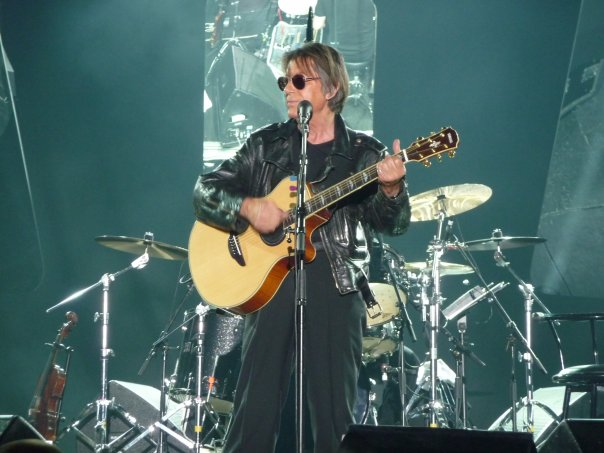
On stage in Lorient, 2010

Dutronc starred in Claude Chabrol's 2000 film Merci pour le chocolat. He was awarded the Best Actor prize at the 2001 Marrakech International Film Festival and was nominated for the César Award for Best Actor for his performance in Jean-Pierre Améris' C'est la vie. In 2002, he starred in Michel Blanc's Summer Things.

In 2003, Dutronc reunited with Jacques Lanzmann for Madame l'existence, an album described by rock critic Christophe Conte as "surpassing, without much apparent effort, everything that [Dutronc] has created in the last two decades".

In 2005, Dutronc was awarded an Honorary César. Since then, he has appeared in films by directors including Gabriel Aghion and Alain Corneau.

In 2010, Dutronc toured for the first time in 17 years, and released recordings from the tour as a live album and DVD, Et vous, et vous, et vous.

Dutronc's 41st film, Les Francis, was released in 2014.

In November 2014, Dutronc performed a series of concerts with Eddy Mitchell and Johnny Hallyday at Paris Bercy, under the name "Les vieilles canailles" ("The Old Gits"). It was reported that, following these performances, Dutronc intended to begin recording a new album with his son Thomas. Said album, Dutronc and Dutronc, was released on 4 November 2022 and features 13 songs originally released by Jacques Dutronc during his early career. Father and son rearranged the songs and both sing on the album.

== Reputation and influence ==
According to a 1979 editorial in the French magazine Rock & Folk, Dutronc is "the one singer who is so closely identified with the 1960s that it has become impossible to talk about them without talking about him". In 1991, "Il est cinq heures, Paris s'éveille" was voted the best French-language single of all time in a poll of music critics organised by Le Nouvel Observateur for a TV special broadcast on Antenne 2, beating Jacques Brel's "Ne me quitte pas" into second place.

Dutronc's songs have been covered by Matthieu Chedid, Vanessa Paradis, Mungo Jerry, Étienne Daho, Sylvie Vartan, Miles Kane, the Divine Comedy, Serge Gainsbourg, Black Lips, Zine, and The Last Shadow Puppets, among others. Dutronc is also mentioned in the lyrics of Jacques Brel's "Vesoul" as well as the Cornershop song "Brimful of Asha".

In 2015, a tribute album was released by Columbia Records featuring various artists interpreting songs by Jacques Dutronc. The 13-track album, titled Joyeux anniversaire M'sieur Dutronc, included performances by Julien Doré, Gaëtan Roussel, Zaz, Joeystarr, Nathy (Tüxo), BAGARRE, Thomas Dutronc, Annie Cordy, the duo Brigitte, Miossec, Francis Cabrel, Francine Massiani, Tété, and Camélia Jordana, in addition to "L'opportuniste" sung by Jacques Dutronc with Nicola Sirkis. The album charted in France and Belgium.

== Personal life ==
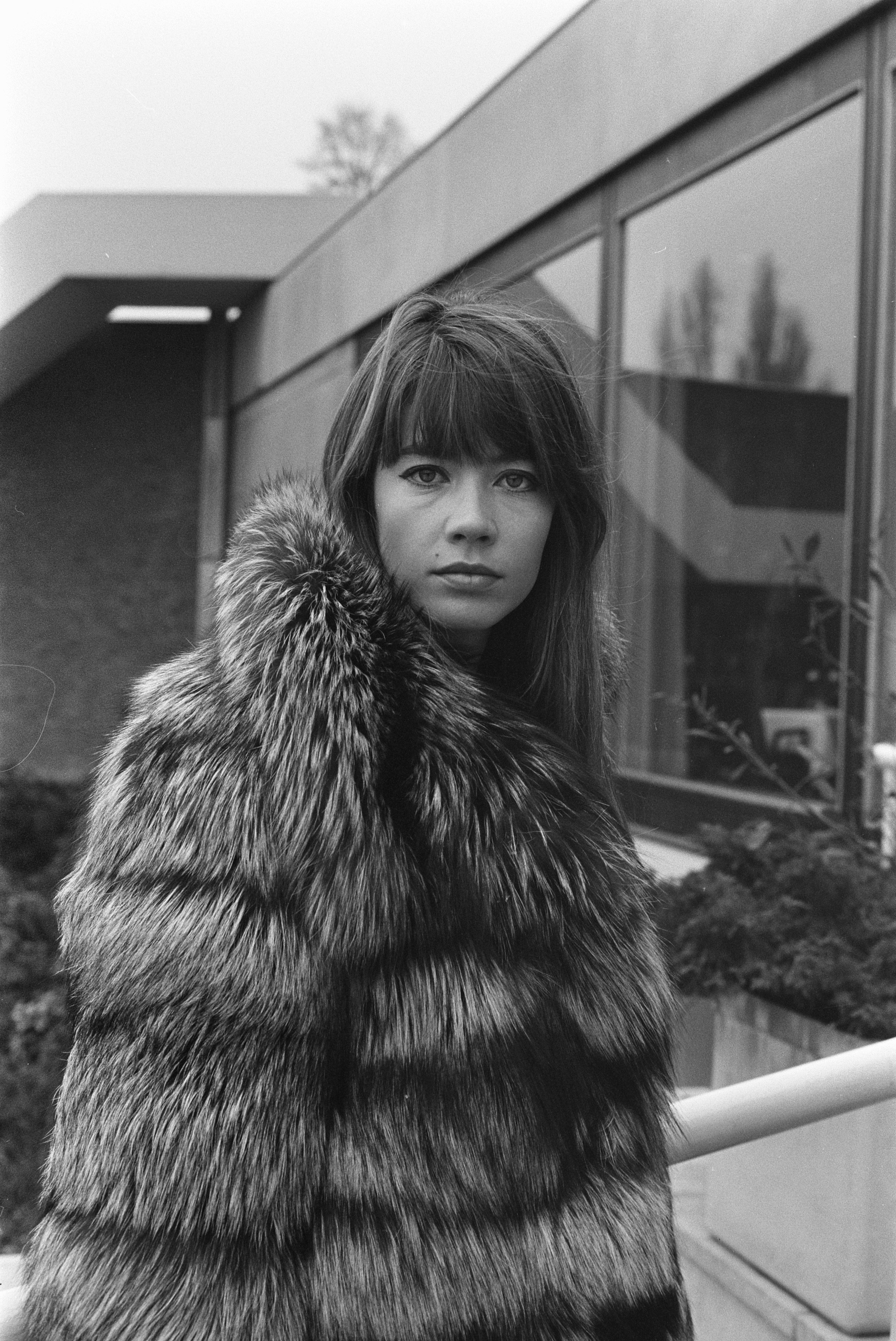
Hardy in December 1969

Dutronc began a relationship with Vogue label-mate Françoise Hardy in 1967. In 1973, they had a son, Thomas, who grew up to become a successful jazz and pop musician. In 1981, they were married, "for tax reasons", according to Hardy. In 1998, Jacques began a relationship with a stylist whom he had met on the set of the film Place Vendôme. Dutronc and Hardy separated in 1988, but remained married and were reported to have seen each other regularly. Hardy died in 2024.

He currently lives near the town of Monticello, Corsica.

In 2015, Dutronc revealed he had a brief relationship with Romy Schneider that lasted as long as they were shooting the film That Most Important Thing: Love.

== Discography ==
=== Studio albums ===
- Jacques Dutronc (1966)
- Jacques Dutronc (1968)
- L'opportuniste (1968)
- Le responsable (1969)
- Jacques Dutronc 71 (1971)
- Jacques Dutronc 72 (1972)
- Jacques Dutronc 75 (1975)
- Guerre et pets (1980)
- C'est pas du bronze (1982)
- C. Q. F. Dutronc (1987)
- Brèves rencontres (1995)
- Madame l'existence (2003)

== Selected filmography ==
Year	Title	Role	Director
1974	Antoine and Sebastian	Sébastien	Jean-Marie Périer
1974	OK patron	Léon Bonnet	Claude Vital
1975	That Most Important Thing: Love	Jacques Chevalier	Andrzej Żuławski
1976	The Good and the Bad	Jacques	Claude Lelouch
1976	Mado	Pierre	Claude Sautet
1977	Violette et François	François	Jacques Rouffio
1977	Le Point de mire	Julien	Jean-Claude Tramont
1978	Dirty Dreamer	Jérôme	Jean-Marie Périer
1978	The Savage State	Avit	Francis Girod
1979	Return to the Beloved	Julien	Jean-François Adam
1979	An Adventure for Two	Simon Lacassaigne	Claude Lelouch
1980	Slow Motion a.k.a. Every Man for Himself	Paul Godard	Jean-Luc Godard
1981	Malevil	Colin	Christian de Chalonge
1984	Cheaters (Tricheurs)	Elric	Barbet Schroeder
1989	My Nights Are More Beautiful Than Your Days	Lucas	Andrzej Żuławski
1991	Van Gogh	Van Gogh	Maurice Pialat
1992	Toutes peines confondues	Antoine Gardella	Michel Deville
1998	Place Vendôme	Battistelli	Nicole Garcia
2000	Merci pour le chocolat	André Polonski	Claude Chabrol
2002	Summer Things	Bertrand Lannier	Michel Blanc
2007	The Second Wind	Stanislas Orloff	Alain Corneau

== See also ==
- French pop
- French rock
- Yé-yé
- Jacques Lanzmann

== Bibliography ==
- Leydier, Michel (2010). Jacques Dutronc: La Bio (in French). Paris: Éditions du Seuil. ISBN 978-2-02-101287-3. OCLC 717019637.
