= Jacques Lanzmann =

French writer (1927–2006)

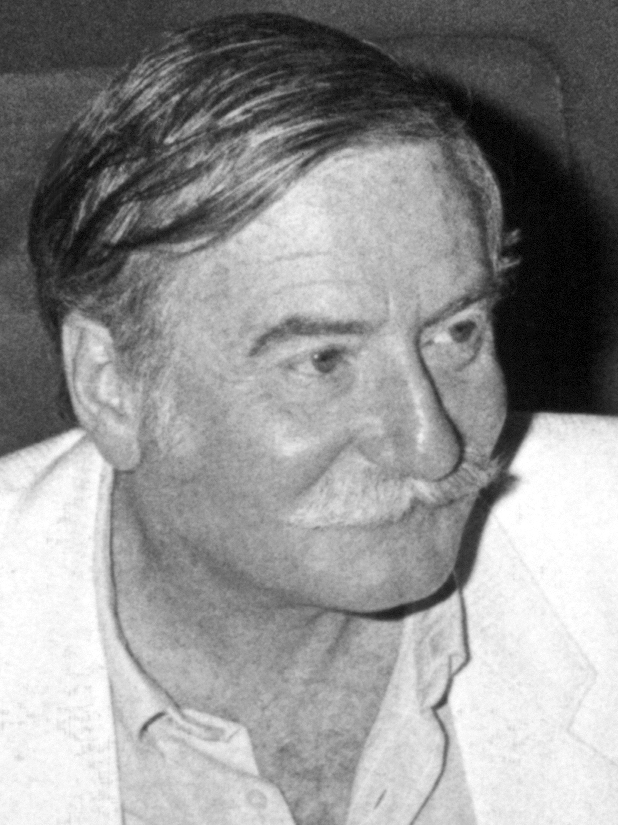
- Jacques Lanzmann, 1981
- Born: 4 May 1927; Bois-Colombes, France
- Died: 21 June 2006 (aged 79); Paris, France
- Occupations: Journalist, author, songwriter
- Spouses: Françoise Detay (divorced); Anne Segalen (divorced); Florence Lanzmann (widowed)
- Children: Chine Lanzmann
- Relatives: Claude Lanzmann (brother), Évelyne Rey (sister)
- Writing career
- Notable awards: Prix RTL grand public, 1977
- Website: jacqueslanzmann.typepad.fr

Jacques Lanzmann (4 May 1927 – 21 June 2006) was a French journalist, writer and lyricist. He is best known as a novelist and for his songwriting partnership with Jacques Dutronc.

== Early life ==
Lanzmann spent the early part of his life in Auvergne. His parents, Paulette (Grobermann) and Armand Lanzmann, divorced shortly before World War II and, at the age of 12, he became a farmhand. Lanzmann was Jewish and, following the Battle of France, he, his mother and his siblings, pretended to be Moroccan Arabs to escape persecution by the Vichy regime. In 1943, Lanzmann and his elder brother Claude (later a noted documentary-maker) joined the Communist resistance. Jacques was taken captive by the Germans and was due to be executed by firing squad, but escaped. Lanzmann's father was one of the leading local figures in the rival Mouvements Unis de la Résistance, but Jacques and Claude were not aware of this until February 1944.

After the war, Lanzmann worked in Paris as builder and a welder, and showed promise as a painter. During the early 1950s, he moved to Chile for two years, where he worked as a copper miner.

== Literary career ==
=== Early novels and editorship of Lui ===
While Lanzmann was in Chile, a manuscript of a novel he had written, La glace est rompue ("The ice is broken"), was given to Jean-Paul Sartre and Simone de Beauvoir by his brother Claude. Claude was in a romantic relationship with Beauvoir at the time. This intervention led to the publication of the novel in 1954.

Lanzmann's second novel, Le Rat d'Amérique, published in 1956, was inspired by his experiences in Chile. Its commercial success led to him being offered a job as a critic for the Communist literary magazine Les Lettres Françaises, edited by Louis Aragon. He was sent by the magazine to the Soviet Union to report on the literary scene there. On his return, he wrote a third novel, Cuir de Russe, published in 1957, which depicted the extreme poverty of Russian peasants that he had witnessed during his visit. The novel was considered a betrayal by the French Communist Party, and Lanzmann was expelled.

Lanzmann continued to write novels and, in 1959, wrote his first adapted screenplay, Le Travail c'est la liberté ("Work is Freedom") (possibly a play on the infamous "Arbeit macht frei"). Between 1960 and 1962 he was a journalist for L'Express. In 1963, he adapted his novel Le Rat d'Amérique as a screenplay for the film Rat Trap, starring Charles Aznavour. In the same year, he was approached by Daniel Filipacchi to edit a new men's magazine Lui, a post which he held until 1968.

=== Pop music ===
In 1966, Jacques Wolfsohn of Disques Vogue asked Lanzmann to work with pop composer Jacques Dutronc to create songs for a beatnik singer called Benjamin. Benjamin released an EP in 1966, featuring songs written with Dutronc and a Lanzmann-Dutronc composition, "Cheveux longs" (Long Hair). However, Wolfsohn was disappointed by Benjamin's recording of a song titled "Et moi, et moi, et moi". A second version was recorded, with Dutronc's former bandmate Hadi Kalafate on vocals. Wolfsohn then asked Dutronc if he would be interested in recording his own version. The single reached number 2 in the French charts in September 1966.

Lanzmann, sometimes working with his wife Anne Segalen, wrote the words for most of Dutronc's output between 1966 and 1980. Dutronc's self-titled debut album, released at the end of 1966, sold over a million copies and was awarded a special Grand Prix du Disque by the Académie Charles Cros, in memoriam of one of its founders. A second single, "Les play boys", spent six weeks at number one and sold 600,000 copies. Dutronc was one of the most commercially successful French music stars of the late 1960s and early 1970s. During that period, he released seven hit albums and more than 20 singles, including two further number ones: "J'aime les filles" in 1967 and "Il est cinq heures, Paris s'éveille" in 1968.

During the recording of the 1980 album Guerre et pets ("War and Farts" – a play on the title of Tolstoy's novel), Wolfsohn proposed that Dutronc write with both Jacques Lanzmann and Serge Gainsbourg. He suggested to the two that they each work on alternative lyrics to go with one of Dutronc's instrumental demos. Lanzmann objected to being placed in competition against another writer, and dropped out of the project. The resulting album consequently only includes two Lanzmann-Dutronc compositions, and is mainly written by Dutronc and Gainsbourg.

In 2003, Dutronc and Lanzmann reunited for Madame l'existence, an album described by rock critic Christophe Conte as "surpassing, without much apparent effort, everything that [Dutronc] has created in the last two decades".

Lanzmann has also worked on songs for a number of other artists, including Johnny Hallyday, Françoise Hardy and Petula Clark. In 1969, he wrote the French adaptation of the musical Hair.

=== Literary career after 1968 ===
After leaving Lui in 1968, Lanzmann co-founded a publishing company, Les Editions Spéciales, with Jean-Claude Lattès. This was originally intended as a niche publishing venture for fiction and non-fiction linked to current affairs but, after Lanzmann sold his interest to Lattès in 1974, the company was renamed JC Lattès and became a more general publishing firm. Today, it is and imprint of Hachette and the French language publisher for authors such as Dan Brown, John Grisham and E. L. James. Lanzmann subsequently founded the publishing company Jacques Lanzmann et Seghers Editeurs.

During the 1970s, Lanzmann wrote a number of best-selling novels and became a professional gambler. He won the prestigious Prix RTL Grand Public in 1977 for his novel Le Têtard.

Lanzmann presented programmes on the television channel Voyage from 1997 until his death.

== Personal life ==
Lanzmann was married four times and had seven children.

He was a keen traveler and walker. He crossed nearly all of the world's deserts, and explored the Sahara Desert at the age of 19. He came close to death while crossing the Taklamakan Desert in 1990. While crossing the Sinai Desert in 1985 he was arrested by Egyptian soldiers on suspicion of spying. In his suitcase, he had a cutting of a Le Monde profile dedicated to him, and was able to secure his release by using this to prove his identity.

When author Gabriel Matzneff was confronted by Canadian novelist and journalist Denise Bombardier for his writing about sexually abusing children, Lanzmann was quoted that he was surprised that Denise Bombardier was not "slapped in the face" for being rude to Matzneff

He died on 21 June 2006, aged 79, in Paris and his funeral was held on 26 June at the Père-Lachaise cemetery. French President Jacques Chirac paid tribute, saying: "His brilliant songs left an imprint on their era. They will remain for a long time in the hearts of the French."

== Bibliography ==
- La Glace est rompue
- Le Rat d'Amérique (1956)
- Cuir de Russie (1957)
- Les Passagers du Sidi-Brahim (1958)
- Un tyran sur le sable (1959)
- Viva Castro (1959)
- Qui vive! (1965)
- Le Têtard (1976)
- Les Transsibériennes (1978)
- Rue des Mamours (1981)
- Une vie de famille (Plon, January 2006)
