= 1918 in literature =

This article contains information about the literary events and publications of 1918.

== Events ==
- January 1 – The English novelist and wartime propagandist Hall Caine is made a Knight Commander of the Order of the British Empire (KBE).
- January 2 – The English novelist Marie Corelli is convicted under wartime legislation against hoarding food.
- January 18 – The first edition of Aussie: The Australian Soldiers' Magazine appears.
- January 23 – The English poet Robert Graves marries the painter Nancy Nicholson in London. The wedding guests include Wilfred Owen, whose first nationally published poem appears three days later ("Miners" in The Nation). He will be killed by the end of the year.

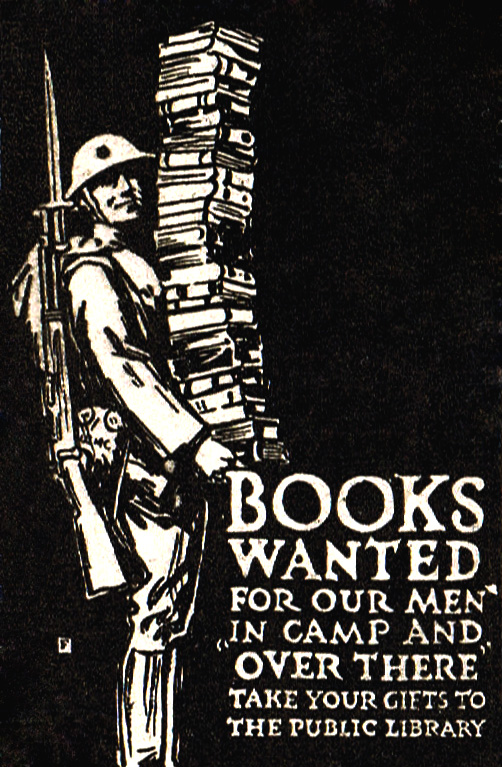
U.S. poster

- March
  - The Telemachus episode in James Joyce's Ulysses is published in serialized form in the U.S. journal The Little Review.
  - The English novelist Alec Waugh is taken prisoner of war. He will be incarcerated in Mainz Citadel with the monologist J. Milton Hayes, also taken prisoner this year, and Hugh Kingsmill.
- April
  - Hu Shih, chief advocate of the use of the vernacular in Chinese literature at the time, publishes an essay, "Constructive Literary Revolution – A Literature of National Speech" in the magazine New Youth (Xin Qingnian) proposing a four-point reform program.
  - The English writer May Sinclair introduces the term "Stream of consciousness" to describe a narrative mode, in a discussion of Dorothy Richardson's novel sequence Pilgrimage in The Egoist.
- May 3 – The New Zealand writer and poet Katherine Mansfield marries her long-time partner John Middleton Murry at Kensington register office in London.
- June
  - The 2nd annual Pulitzer Prizes are awarded in the United States, including the first award for a novel.
  - The English poet Basil Bunting is imprisoned as a conscientious objector.
- August 17 – The poets Wilfred Owen and Siegfried Sassoon meet for the last time, in London, and spend what Sassoon will recall as "the whole of a hot cloudless afternoon together."
- October 3 – Siegfried Sassoon visits his mentor Robbie Ross for the last time. Sassoon will write later that Ross's goodbye gave him a "presentiment of final farewell."
- November 4 – Wilfred Owen is killed in action aged 25, at the Sambre–Oise Canal, with only five of his poems published. News of his death reaches his parents in Shrewsbury a week later on Armistice Day. He is awarded a posthumous Military Cross a year later.
- December – The Poems of Gerard Manley Hopkins (died 1889, including The Wreck of the Deutschland, 1875/1876) are published through Robert Bridges. Few were published in Hopkins' lifetime, so that this introduces his innovative sprung rhythm and imagery to many readers.
- December 28 – Emperor Khải Định of Vietnam declares the traditional Chữ nôm script for the Vietnamese language to be replaced by the Latin script Vietnamese alphabet.
- Winter – Parisian farceur Georges Feydeau contracts tertiary syphilis.

== New books ==
=== Fiction ===
- Ryūnosuke Akutagawa – "Hell Screen" (地獄変, Jigokuhen; short story)
- Arnold Bennett – The Roll-Call
- Victor Bridges – The Lady from Long Acre
- Willa Cather – My Ántonia
- Blaise Cendrars
  - I Have Killed (J'ai tué)
  - The Severed Hand (La Main coupée)
- J. Storer Clouston – The Man from the Clouds
- Marie Corelli – The Young Diana
- Grazia Deledda – L'incendio nell'oliveto (The fire in the olive-grove)
- Ethel M. Dell – Greatheart
- Alfred Döblin – Wadzeks Kampf mit der Dampfturbine (Wadzek's Struggle with the Steam Turbine)
- Sarah Lee Brown Fleming – Hope's Highway
- Mary E. Wilkins Freeman – Edgewater People
- August Gailit – Fairyland
- Owen Gregory – Meccania the Super-State
- Thea von Harbou – Das indische Grabmal (The Indian Tomb)
- Frederic S. Isham – Three Live Ghosts
- Herbert George Jenkins – Patricia Brent, Spinster
- Wyndham Lewis – Tarr (in book form)
- Lu Xun – "Diary of a Madman" (狂人日記, "Kuángrén Rìjì", short story)
- Compton Mackenzie – The Early Life and Adventures of Sylvia Scarlett
- Brinsley MacNamara (John Weldon writing as Oliver Blyth) – The Valley of the Squinting Windows
- Heinrich Mann – Der Untertan
- Frans Masereel – 25 Images of a Man's Passion (wordless novel)
- André Maurois – Les Silences du Colonel Bramble
- George Moore – A Story-Teller's Holiday
- Baroness Orczy
  - Flower o' the Lily
  - The Man in Grey
- Leo Perutz – From Nine to Nine (Zwischen neun und neun, originally Freiheit)
- Henry De Vere Stacpoole – The Man Who Lost Himself
- Junichiro Tanizaki (谷崎 潤一郎) – Gold and Silver (金と銀)
- Booth Tarkington – The Magnificent Ambersons
- Edgar Wallace
  - The Clue of the Twisted Candle
  - Down Under Donovan
  - The Man Who Knew
  - Those Folk of Bulboro
- Mary Augusta Ward – The War and Elizabeth
- Rebecca West – The Return of the Soldier
- Edith Wharton – The Marne
- Valentine Williams – The Man with the Clubfoot
- Francis Brett Young – The Crescent Moon

=== Musical Theatre ===
- Harry Carroll and Joseph McCarthy – Oh, Look!

=== Children and young people ===
- Elsa Beskow – Tant Grön, tant Brun och tant Gredelin (Aunt Green, Aunt Brown and Aunt Lavender)
- Edgar Rice Burroughs – Tarzan and the Jewels of Opar
- May Gibbs – Tales of Snugglepot and Cuddlepie: their adventures wonderful
- Johnny Gruelle – Raggedy Ann Stories
- Norman Lindsay – The Magic Pudding: Being The Adventures of Bunyip Bluegum and his friends Bill Barnacle and Sam Sawnoff
- Ferenc Móra – Kincskereső kisködmön (A Little Fortune-Hunting Frock Coat)
- Beatrix Potter – The Tale of Johnny Town-Mouse

=== Drama ===
- Bertolt Brecht – Baal (written)
- John Drinkwater – Abraham Lincoln
- Marcel Gerbidon and Paul Armont – School for Coquettes (L'École des cocottes)
- Susan Glaspell – Tickless Time
- Walter Hackett – The Freedom of the Seas
- Hugo von Hofmannsthal – The Difficult Man
- James Joyce – Exiles
- Georg Kaiser – Gas
- Alice Dunbar Nelson – Mine Eyes Have Seen
- Gregorio Martínez Sierra – Sueño de Una Noche de Agosto (Dream of an August Night)
- Vladimir Mayakovsky – Mystery-Bouffe («Мистерия-Буфф», Misteriya-Buff)
- Emma Orczy (Baroness Orczy) – The Legion of Honour (adaptation of A Sheaf of Bluebells)
- Luigi Pirandello
  - But It's Nothing Serious (Ma non è una cosa seria)
  - The Rules of the Game (Il giuoco delle parti, literally The Game of Rôles)

=== Poetry ===
- Guillaume Apollinaire – Calligrammes: Poems of Peace and War, 1913-1916
- Laurence Binyon – The New World: Poems
- Vera Brittain – Verses of a VAD
- Toirdhealbhach Mac Suibhne (Terence MacSwiney) – Battle-cries
- Walter de la Mare – The Marionettes
- Siegfried Sassoon – Counter-Attack and Other Poems
- Edward Thomas (posthumous) – Last Poems
- Tristan Tzara – Vingt-cinq poèmes

=== Non-fiction ===
- Henry Adams – The Education of Henry Adams
- Enid Bagnold – A Diary Without Dates
- Karl Barth – The Epistle to the Romans (dated 1919)
- Clive Bell – Pot-boilers
- Laurence Binyon – For Dauntless France
- Arthur Conan Doyle – The New Revelation
- François-Marie-Joseph Gourdon – An Account of the Entry of the Catholic Religion into Sichuan
- William Inge – The Philosophy of Plotinus
- Daniel Jones – An Outline of English Phonetics
- Federico García Lorca – Impressiones y Paisajes (Impressions and Landscapes)
- Vladimir Lenin – The State and Revolution
- Thomas Mann – Reflections of a Nonpolitical Man
- Walther Rathenau – An Deutschlands Jugend
- Oswald Spengler – The Decline of the West (Der Untergang des Abendlandes)
- Dr Marie Stopes
  - Married Love
  - Wise Parenthood
- Lytton Strachey – Eminent Victorians
- Mary Augusta Ward – A Writer's Recollections

== Births ==
- January 11 – Robert C. O'Brien, American novelist (died 1973)
- January 16
  - Philip José Farmer, American science fiction writer (died 2009)
  - Stirling Silliphant, American writer, producer (died 1996)
- January 30 – Bazilije Pandžić, Croatian historian, archivist and orientalist (died 2019)
- February 1 – Muriel Spark, Scottish novelist (died 2006)
- February 6 – Lothar-Günther Buchheim, German novelist, war correspondent and painter (died 2007)
- March 9 – Mickey Spillane, American mystery writer (died 2006)
- March 10 – Theodore Cogswell, American science fiction author (died 1987)
- March 15 – Richard Ellmann, American literary biographer (died 1987)
- April 23
  - Maurice Druon, French historical novelist (died 2009)
  - James Kirkup, English poet (died 2009)
- May 16 – Juan Rulfo, Mexican author (died 1986)
- June 9 – Bidhyanath Pokhrel, Nepali poet (died 1994)
- July 9 – John Heath-Stubbs, English poet and translator (died 2006)
- July 14 – Arthur Laurents, American novelist and screenwriter (died 2011)
- July 24 – Antonio Candido, Brazilian literary critic (died 2017)
- August 9 – Robert Aldrich, American writer and filmmaker (died 1983)
- August 20 – Jacqueline Susann, American novelist (died 1974)
- August 27 – Leon Levițchi, Romanian translator (died 1991)
- September 19 – Penelope Mortimer, Welsh-born English novelist and biographer (died 1999)
- October 19 – Louis Althusser, French Marxist philosopher (died 1990)
- October 22 – René de Obaldia, French playwright and poet (died 2022)
- October 29 – Ștefan Baciu, Romanian and Brazilian poet, novelist and literary promoter (died 1993)
- November 2 – Roger Lancelyn Green, English biographer (died 1987)
- November 16 – Nicholas Moore, English poet (died 1986)
- November 20 – Naomi Frankel, German-born Israeli novelist (died 2009)
- November 25 – Peter Opie, English writer on children's literature and lore (died 1982)
- November 29 – Madeleine L'Engle, American writer for children and teens (died 2007)
- December 7 – Liu Yichang, Chinese novelist, editor and publisher (died 2018)
- December 11 – Aleksandr Solzhenitsyn, Russian novelist (died 2008)
- December 30 – Al Purdy, Canadian poet (died 2000)

== Deaths ==
- January 1 – William Wilfred Campbell, Canadian poet (born 1860)
- January 6 – Dora Sigerson Shorter, Irish poet, novelist and sculptor (born 1866)
- January 28 – John McCrae, Canadian military surgeon and war poet (pneumonia, born 1872)
- February 8 – Lascăr Vorel, Romanian visual artist and short story writer (kidney disease, born 1879)
- February 9 – E. J. Richmond, American novelist and children's writer (born 1825)
- March 19 – Florence Anderson Clark, American author, newspaper editor, librarian, and university administrator (born 1835)
- April 1 – Isaac Rosenberg, English poet and artist (killed in action, born 1890)
- April – William Hope Hodgson, English author and essayist (killed in action, born 1877)
- May 8 – Ernst von Hesse-Wartegg, Austrian writer and traveller (born 1851)
- May 27 – Francis George Fowler, English grammarian (tuberculosis contracted on military service, born 1871)
- June 10 – Arrigo Boito (Tobia Gorio), Italian poet and composer (born 1842)
- June 26 – Peter Rosegger, Austrian poet (born 1843)
- June 28 – Alexander Turnbull, New Zealand bibliophile (born 1868)
- July 22 – Helen Stuart Campbell, American author, novelist and economist (born 1839)
- July 26 – Helen Taggart Clark, American columnist, short story writer, and poet (born 1849)
- July 30 – Joyce Kilmer, American poet (killed in action, born 1886)
- August 3 – Maria Fetherstonhaugh, English novelist (born 1847)
- September 28 – Eduard von Keyserling, Baltic German fiction writer and dramatist (born 1855)
- October 5 – Robbie Ross, journalist (heart failure; born 1869)
- October 21 – Jennie O. Starkey, journalist (pneumonia after influenza; born ca. 1856)
- November 4
  - Wilfred Owen, English poet (killed in action, born 1893)
  - Andrew Dickson White, American diplomat and author (born 1832)
- November 9 – Guillaume Apollinaire, French poet, dramatist, novelist and critic (influenza, born 1880)
- November 14 – Seumas O'Kelly, Irish journalist and author (born 1881; heart attack)
- November 24 – Annie Hall Cudlip, English novelist, journalist and editor (born 1838)
- December 1 – Margit Kaffka, Hungarian novelist, short story writer and poet (born 1880; influenza)
- December 2 – Edmond Rostand, French poet and dramatist (influenza; born 1868)
- December 15 – Salvatore Farina, Italian novelist (born 1846)
- unknown date — Eva Kinney Griffith, American journalist, temperance activist, novelist, newspaper editor, and journal publisher (born 1852)

== Awards ==
- Nobel Prize in Literature: not awarded
- Pulitzer Prize for Drama: Jesse Lynch Williams, Why Marry?
- Pulitzer Prize for Poetry: Sara Teasdale, Love Songs
- Pulitzer Prize for the Novel: Ernest Poole, His Family

== See also ==
- World War I in literature
