= School for Coquettes =

School for Coquettes (French: L'École des cocottes) may refer to:

- School for Coquettes (play), a 1918 play by Marcel Gerbidon and Paul Armont
- School for Coquettes (1935 film), a 1935 film adaptation
- School for Coquettes (1958 film), a 1958 film adaptation

== See also ==
- The School for Coquettes, an 1831 comedy play by Catherine Gore
