= Nicolas Nancey =

French dramatist and screenwriter

- Born: Nicolas Zouros; 1874; Marseille, France
- Died: 13 October 1925 (aged 50–51); Marseille, France
- Occupations: Dramatist, screenwriter

Nicolas Nancey, real name Nicolas Zouros, (1874 – 13 October 1925) was a French dramatist and screenwriter.

Once referred to as a successor of Eugène Labiche and Georges Feydeau, he wrote fifteen plays in the vaudeville as well as boulevard genre, in collaboration with dramatists such as Paul Armont, Henry de Gorsse or André Mouëzy-Éon.

== Theatre ==
- 1916: La Ventouse, one-act play cowritten with Jean Manoussi
- 1925: Un petit nez retroussé, comédie-vaudeville in four acts cowritten with André Birabeau

in collaboration with Paul Armont

- 1905: Le Truc du Brésilien
- 1906: Le Trèfle à quatre
- 1909: Théodore et Cie
- 1920: Le Zèbre

in collaboration with Jean Rioux

- 1912: Pétoche, vaudeville in two acts
- 1913: Monsieur le juge, vaudeville in four acts
- 1914: Faute de grives, vaudeville in one act

in collaboration with André Mouëzy-Éon

- 1919: L'Héritier du bal Tabarin
- 1925: Il est cocu, le chef de gare

in collaboration with Henry de Gorsse

- 1921: Trois poules pour un coq, vaudeville in 3 acts
- 1921: Oscar ! Tu le seras, vaudeville in 3 acts
- 1922: Le Coup d'Abélard, vaudeville in 3 acts
- 1923: Un homme de paille, vaudeville in 3 acts
- La Petite Dame du wagon-lit

== Filmography ==
- 1916: La trovata del brasiliano, directed by Filippo Castamagna, based on the play Le Truc du Brésilien
- 1920: The Glad Eye, directed by Kenelm Foss and James Reardon, based on the play Le Zèbre
- 1923: À la gare, directed by Robert Saidreau
- 1925: Teodoro e socio, directed by Mario Bonnard, based on the play Théodore et Cie
- 1927: The Glad Eye, directed by Maurice Elvey, based on the play Le Zèbre
- 1932: Le Truc du Brésilien, directed by Alberto Cavalcanti, based on the play Le Truc du Brésilien
- 1932: Ah! Quelle gare!, directed by René Guissart, based on the play Il est cocu, le chef de gare
- 1933: Theodore and Company, directed by Pierre Colombier, based on the play Théodore et Cie
- 1933: L'Héritier du bal Tabarin, directed by Jean Kemm, based on the play L'Héritier du bal Tabarin
- 1936: La Petite Dame du wagon-lit, directed by Maurice Cammage, based on the play La Petite Dame du wagon-lit
- 1939: Un mare di guai, directed by Carlo Ludovico Bragaglia, based on the play Théodore et Cie
- 1941: Station Master, directed by Jan Sviták, based on the play Il est cocu, le chef de gare
- 1946: El tercer huésped, directed by Eduardo Boneo, based on the play Il est cocu, le chef de gare
