= The Glad Eye =

The Glad Eye may refer to:

- a British slang expression. According to the Cambridge University Press, to give someone the glad eye means “to look at SB (somebody) in a way that shows you find them sexually attractive.”
- The Glad Eye (1920 film), a British comedy directed by Kenelm Foss
- The Glad Eye (1927 film), a British comedy directed by Maurice Elvey
