= Marcel Nancey =

French journalist

Marcel Nancey was a French journalist, dramatist and theater manager for many Parisian entertainment venues including the galerie Vivienne (1902–1903), the Théâtre Moderne (1901–1903), the Théâtre des Bouffes-Parisiens (1903–1904), the Opéra-Bouffe (1904), the Théâtre Mondain (1906–1914), the Little-Palace (1910–1919), the Théâtre Comœdia (1920–1945), the Théâtre des Deux-Masques (1921–1923), the Théâtre du Moulin-Bleu and again the Théâtre des Deux-Masques (1935–1937).

== Some works ==
- 1903: Le Billet de faveur, comedy in one act, Fantaisies-Parisiennes (September)
- 1904: Le Truc du Brésilien, comédie en vaudevilles in four acts in collaboration with Paul Armont, Théâtre de Cluny (12 October)
- 1912: La Part du feu, comedy in four acts in collaboration with André Mouëzy-Éon, Théâtre des Bouffes-Parisiens (24 December)
- 1916: La Ventouse, comedy in one act in collaboration with Jean Manoussi, Théâtre du Grand-Guignol (November)
- 1919: La Peau, play in one act in collaboration with André Birabeau, Théâtre du Grand-Guignol (14 March)
- 1927: La Vénus de Deauville, operetta in three acts by Alain Monjardin, lyrics by A. Monjardin, Marcel Nancey and Léo Demars, music by Sylvabell-Demars, Théâtre Comœdia (30 May)
