= Gabriel Timmory =

French writer (1870–1965)

- Born: René Wahl; 6 November 1870; Rennes (Ille-et-Vilaine), France
- Died: 20 April 1965 (aged 94); Nice (Alpes-Maritimes), France
- Occupations: Dramatist, screenwriter

Gabriel Timmory (6 November 1870 – 20 April 1965) was a French dramatist, teacher, journalist, lecturer and screenwriter.

For a number of plays, comedies and saynetes, he collaborated with the playwrights Jean Manoussi and Maurice de Marsan. In 1921, he made an adaptation of one of the Fantômas stories for the stage.

== Theatre plays ==
- 1902: Un beau mariage cowritten with Jean Manoussi
- 1903: Petite Bonne sérieuse cowritten with Jean Manoussi
- 1904: Pomme de terre cowrittenwith Jean Manoussi
- 1906: Un gentilhomme cowritten with Jean Manoussi
- 1906: Le Planteur de Chicago or Le cultivateur de Chicago
- 1909: Un cambrioleur ingénieux cowritten with Jean Manoussi
- 1910: Le Matelot Cartahut cowritten with Maurice de Marsan
- 1911: La Course aux dollars cowritten with Maurice de Marsan
- 1913: Rigadin et la petite Moulinet
- 1913: La Dame du Louvre cowritten with Jean Manoussi
- 1913: L'insaisissable Stanley Collins cowritten with Maurice de Marsan
- 1918: Les Kriekenrinckx d'Anvers
- 1918: Les Profiteurs
- 1919: Oublions le passé
- 1919: Conte à Madelon
- 1920: Monsieur Pédicule
- 1921: Ici on danse
- 1921: La guerre en pantoufles cowritten with Félix Galipaux
- 1921: Les Exploits de Lucienne
- 1921: Les Points de chute
- 1923: Manuel déraisonné de tous les sports
- 1923: Les Affaires d'amour
- 1926: Straban le féroce
- 1926: Les Étapes de la volupté en vingt arrondissements
- 1928: Nous allons passer une bonne soirée ! cowritten with Félix Galipaux
- 1930: Un désespéré
- 1932: La Compression
- 1933: Le Goûter chez Nanette
- 1936: Je veux une aventure (poetry)
- 1937: La Maison historique, monologue by François Timmory
- 1939: Le Banquet de la Fraternelle
- 1949: Ce qui se passe après, adaptation of the play The Sequel by Percival Wilde
- 1951: L'éboulement, adaptation of the play by Percival Wilde

== Screenwriter ==
- 1909: Le mariage de la cuisinière, anonymous
- 1909: Le Client de province, anonymous
- 1909: Un Cambrioleur ingénieux, co-screenwriter with Jean Manoussi
- 1910: Le Truc de Rigadin by Georges Monca
- 1911: Rigadin veut se faire arrêter by Georges Monca
- 1911: Nick Winter contre Nick Winter, by Gérard Bourgeois
- 1912: Rigardin et la petite moulinet, by Georges Monca
- 1948: Memories Are Not for Sale, co-screenwriter with Robert Hennion
