= The Atomic Monsieur Placido =

1950 film

- Directed by: Robert Hennion
- Written by: Paul Colline
- Produced by: Léon Beytout; René Pignières
- Starring: Rellys; Liliane Bert; René Génin
- Cinematography: Raymond Clunie
- Edited by: Raymond Louveau
- Music by: Louiguy; Roger Roger
- Production company: Société Nouvelle de Cinématographie
- Distributed by: Société Nouvelle de Cinématographie
- Release date: 5 July 1950
- Running time: 80 minutes
- Country: France
- Language: French

The Atomic Monsieur Placido (French: L'atomique Monsieur Placido) is a 1950 French comedy crime film directed by Robert Hennion and starring Rellys, Liliane Bert and René Génin. The film's sets were designed by the art director Aimé Bazin.

== Cast ==
- Rellys as Toni / Placido
- Liliane Bert as Zaza
- René Génin as Le violoniste
- Jean Témerson as Un maître d'hôtel
- Michel Ardan as Jim
- René Alié as Un gangster
- Arsenio Freignac as Sainclair
- Georges Bever as Un maître d'hôtel
- Henri Chauve
- Pierre Destailles as Le gérant de l'hôtel
- Jean Dunot as Le policier
- Gayot
- Philippe Janvier as L'impresario
- Rudy Lenoir
- Julien Maffre as Le directeur
- Jacques Provins as L'Égyptien
- Marcel Rouzé
- Zoïga
- Nina Myral as La vieille dame
- Madeleine Suffel as Une comédienne
- Blanche Ariel
- Christiane Barry as Une comédienne
- Jacqueline Lerinat
- Lisette Lebon
- Robert Arnoux as Joe
- Nicolas Amato as Le régisseur
- Jacques Beauvais as Un maître d'hôtel

== Bibliography ==
- Maurice Bessy, Raymond Chirat & André Bernard. Histoire du cinéma français: 1940-1950. Pygmalion, 1986.
