= Down Under Donovan (novel) =

1918 novel by Edgar Wallace

- Author: Edgar Wallace
- Language: English
- Genre: Crime
- Publication date: 1918
- Publication place: United Kingdom
- Media type: Print

Down Under Donovan is a 1918 crime novel by the British writer Edgar Wallace.

== Film adaptation ==
In 1922, it was made into a British silent film called Down Under Donovan made by Stoll Pictures and starring Cora Goffin.

== Bibliography ==
- Goble, Alan. The Complete Index to Literary Sources in Film. Walter de Gruyter, 1999.
