= Memories Are Not for Sale =

1948 film

- Directed by: Robert Hennion
- Written by: Paul Achard; Pierre Apestéguy; Frédéric Boutet; Robert Hennion; Michel de Saint-Pierre; Gabriel Timmory
- Produced by: René Bianco; Louis Lefait
- Starring: Frank Villard; Blanchette Brunoy; Sophie Desmarets; Martine Carol
- Cinematography: Willy Faktorovitch
- Edited by: Robert Isnardon
- Music by: Louiguy
- Production companies: Enzko Films; Films Azur
- Distributed by: Les Réalisations d'Art Cinématographique
- Release date: 17 September 1948
- Running time: 87 minutes
- Country: France
- Language: French

Memories Are Not for Sale (French: Les souvenirs ne sont pas à vendre) is a 1948 French comedy drama film directed by Robert Hennion and starring Frank Villard, Blanchette Brunoy, Sophie Desmarets and Martine Carol. The film's sets were designed by the art director Aimé Bazin. It is also known by the alternative title Sextette.

== Synopsis ==
A hotelier, retiring after many years in the business, takes one last look around the property. It triggers memories of the various guests who have stayed there which he recalls in a series of episodes, some light and some dark in tone.

== Cast ==
- Frank Villard as Jean
- Maurice Baquet as Rondo
- Blanchette Brunoy as Jeanne
- Sophie Desmarets as Brigitte
- Martine Carol as Sonia
- Colette Darfeuil as Marie-Hélène
- Monique Delavaud as Trinita
- Jean-Jacques Delbo as Max
- France Ellys as Maria
- Jacques Famery as Georges
- Robert Favart as Dessanges
- Arsenio Freignac as Frère de Trinita
- Yvonne Gaudeau as Madeleine
- Gautier-Sylla as Père de Trinita
- Robert Hommet as Lord Brookfield
- Pierre Juvenet as Locataire
- Max Maxudian as Dupuis
- Alexandre Rignault as Sancelmoz
- Gilles Watteaux as François
- Marthe Sarbel as Une invitée

== Bibliography ==
- Rège, Philippe. Encyclopedia of French Film Directors, Volume 1. Scarecrow Press, 2009.
