= Down Under Donovan =

1922 British film by Harry Lambart

- Directed by: Harry Lambart
- Written by: Forbes Dawson
- Based on: Down Under Donovan by Edgar Wallace
- Production company: Stoll Pictures
- Distributed by: Stoll Pictures
- Release date: September 1922
- Country: United Kingdom
- Languages: Silent; English intertitles

Down Under Donovan is a 1922 British silent crime film directed by Harry Lambart and starring Cora Goffin, W.H. Benham and Bertram Parnell. It is based on the 1918 novel of the same title by Edgar Wallace.

== Cast ==
- Cora Goffin as Mary President
- W.H. Benham as Eric Stanton
- Bertram Parnell as Milton Sands
- William Lugg as John President
- W.H. Willitts as Ivan Soltikoff
- Cecil Rutledge as John Partridge
- Peggy Surtees as Mrs. Bud Kitson
- John Monkhouse as Sir George Frodmere

== Bibliography ==
- Goble, Alan. The Complete Index to Literary Sources in Film. Walter de Gruyter, 1999.
- Low, Rachael. The History of the British Film 1918-1929. George Allen & Unwin, 1971.
