= Meccania =

Book by Owen Gregory

Meccania: The Super-State
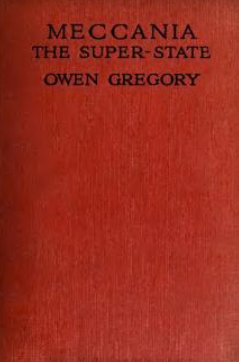
- Author: Owen Gregory
- Language: English
- Genre: Dystopian fiction Speculative fiction
- Publisher: Methuen
- Publication date: 1918
- Publication place: United Kingdom
- Media type: Print (Hardcover)
- Pages: xviii + 298

Meccania: The Super-State is a dystopian novel by Owen Gregory, first published in 1918.

Most of the book describes the fictional country of "Meccania," a nation in Central Europe with obvious resemblances to Germany: Meccania is surrounded by "Francaria" (France), "Luniland" (Britain), "Lugrabia" (Austria) and Idiotica (Russia). Meccania is a place where dissenters are sent to mental hospitals and concentration camps. The state maintains a eugenic breeding program and commands its common citizens when to have children. All letters are censored, and all telephone conversations are monitored. All citizens wear the uniforms of their occupational classes. Among the very complex regulations of the Super-State are those regarding control of worker fatigue: if a given worker's calculated fatigue level is below average, he must work more hours until he is as tired as his compatriots.

The novel's frame story is set in the future (from the novel's perspective) year 1970. A young Chinese traveler named Ming Yuen-hwuy enters Meccania for a five-month stay. Ming's diary and notes describe his dreary and dehumanizing sojourn in a country where the militaristic government dominates social life. Meccania, a place of "perpetual propaganda...," presents the visitor with "an odd mixture of arrogance, xenophobia, over-punctiliousness, over-organization, chauvinism, and rigidity...." Ming is constantly observed by official guides. Ming provokes his state minders when he tries to find a newspaper; he gets into more trouble when the personal record he is required to keep does not match the records of his guides with perfect exactness.

Ming also learns the history of Meccania — how "Bludiron" (Otto von Bismarck) organized the nation to resist the socialism of "Spotts" (a pun on the surname of Karl Marx).
