= A Dog That Pays Off =

1932 film

- Directed by: Jean Choux
- Written by: Jean Choux
- Based on: A Dog That Pays Off by Marcel Gerbidon and Paul Armont
- Starring: René Lefèvre; Arletty; Christiane Dor
- Cinematography: Robert Batton
- Music by: Adolphe Borchard
- Production companies: Cinéas; Superfilm; Vox
- Release date: 1 January 1932
- Running time: 87 minutes
- Country: France
- Language: French

A Dog That Pays Off (French: Un chien qui rapporte) is a 1932 French comedy film directed by Jean Choux and starring René Lefèvre, Arletty and Christiane Dor. The film's sets were designed by the art directors Robert-Jules Garnier and Marcel Magniez. Location shooting took place around Paris including in the Bois de Boulogne and around Pont de Grenelle.

== Synopsis ==
Josyane Plaisir, a singer short of money, joins the scheme of a dog owner who suggests that she should borrow his dog to ensnare rich men in a scheme. However René, the man she does meet through the plan, is himself very poor.

== Cast ==
- René Lefèvre as René Brodart
- Arletty as Josyane Plaisir / Honorine Balut
- Médy as Alfred Debarazet
- Christiane Dor as Lucie
- Hélène Hallier as Loulou Craquelin
- Paulette Dubost as Suzy
- Rose Lorraine as Gaby
- Véra Sherbane as Alicette Paradio
- Laure Diana as La comtesse de Noyant-Maupré
- Madeleine Guitty as Mme Gras, la concierge
- Jean Coquelin as Homme qui attend la concierge

== Bibliography ==
- O'Brien, Charles. Cinema's Conversion to Sound: Technology and Film Style in France and the U.S.. Indiana University Press, 2005.
- Rège, Philippe. Encyclopedia of French Film Directors, Volume 1. Scarecrow Press, 2009.
