= Jean Manoussi =

French playwright and screenwriter

- Born: 14 November 1868; Marseille, France
- Died: 21 December 1929 (aged 61); Paris, France
- Occupations: Dramatist, film director and screenwriter

Jean Manoussi (14 November 1868 - 21 December 1929) was a French dramatist, film director and screenwriter. Jean Manoussi has written several theatre plays in collaboration with playwrights such as Paul Armont, Marcel Gerbidon or Gabriel Timmory.

== Theatre ==
- 1902 : Un beau mariage, cowritten with Gabriel Timmory
- 1903 : Petite bonne sérieuse, cowritten with Gabriel Timmory
- 1904 : Pomme de terre, cowritten with Gabriel Timmory
- 1909 : Un cambrioleur ingénieux, cowritten with Gabriel Timmory
- 1913 : Le Chevalier au masque, cowritten with Paul Armont
- 1916 : La Ventouse, cowritten with Marcel Nancey
- 1923 : Dicky, cowritten with Paul Armont and Marcel Gerbidon

== Filmography ==
as director

- 1919 : Fanny Lear, cowritten with Robert Boudrioz, after Ludovic Halévy and Henri Meilhac,
- 1919 : L'Homme bleu after the novel by Georges Le Faure
- 1920 : Illusions
- 1922 : Le Grillon du foyer
- 1923 : Le Dernier des Capendu
- 1925 : The Painter and His Model, German film of the Maxim-Film Ges. Ebner & Co in Berlin
- 1926 : Fedora, also screenwriter, after the play by Victorien Sardou
- 1926 : Ma maison de Saint-Cloud after the novel by Paul Bourget

As screenwriter

- 1909 : Un cambrioleur ingénieux
- 1925: Knock
- 1927 : Le Secret de Délia or L'Évadée by Henri Ménessier after a play by Victorien Sardou

=== Cinema adaptations ===
- 1936 : The Mysterious Mister X by Johann Alexander Hübler-Kahla after Dicky (1923)
- 1938 : Monsieur Breloque a disparu by Robert Péguy after Dicky (1923)
- 1940 : Trappola d'amore by Raffaello Matarazzo after Dicky (1923)
- 1955 : The Purple Mask by H. Bruce Humberstone after Le Chevalier au masque (1913)
