= The Feather =

1929 British film

- Directed by: Leslie Hiscott
- Written by: Charlotte Mary Matheson (novel); Leslie Hiscott
- Produced by: Julius Hagen
- Starring: Jameson Thomas; Véra Flory; Randle Ayrton; Mary Clare
- Cinematography: Basil Emmott
- Production company: Strand
- Distributed by: United Artists
- Release date: November 1929
- Running time: 8,000 feet
- Country: United Kingdom
- Languages: Sound (Synchronized); English Intertitles

The Feather is a 1929 sound British romantic drama film directed by Leslie S. Hiscott, based on the 1927 novel of the same name by Charlotte Mary Matheson, and starring Jameson Thomas, Véra Flory, Randle Ayrton and Mary Clare. While the film has no audible dialog, it features a synchronized musical score, singing and sound effects. The film was made by the independent producer Julius Hagen at Elstree Studios.

== Cast ==
- Jameson Thomas as Roger Dalton
- Véra Flory as Mavis Cottrell
- Randle Ayrton as Rizzio
- Mary Clare as Mrs. Dalton
- W. Cronin Wilson as Mr. Cottrell
- James Reardon as Quint
- Charles Paton as Professor Vivian
- Irene Tripod as Mrs. Higgins
- Grace Lane as Nun

== Music ==
The film featured two theme songs which are entitled "Within The Garden Of My Heart" and "The Three Roses."

== See also ==
- List of early sound feature films (1926–1929)
