= Christiane Dor =

French actress (1892–1939)

- Born: Blanche Marguerite Sauty; 7 March 1892; Arras, Pas-de-Calais; France
- Died: 14 May 1939 (aged 47); Paris, France
- Occupation: Actress
- Years active: 1922–1936 (film)

Christiane Dor (1892–1939) was a French stage actress, film actress and singer. She appeared in numerous operettas and musical comedies on the Paris stage during the 1920s and 1930s. In cinema she played a number of supporting roles.

== Selected filmography ==
- The Levy Department Stores (1932)
- A Father Without Knowing It (1932)
- The Improvised Son (1932)
- A Dog That Pays Off (1932)
- The Red Head (1932)
- The Old Devil (1933)
- Ciboulette (1933)
- Song of Farewell (1934)
- A Man of Gold (1934)
- His Other Love (1934)
- One Night's Secret (1934)
- Madame Bovary (1934)
- Mademoiselle Mozart (1935)

== Bibliography ==
- Capua, Michelangelo. Anatole Litvak: The Life and Films. McFarland, 2015.
- Crisp, Colin. French Cinema—A Critical Filmography: Volume 1, 1929–1939. Indiana University Press, 2015.
- Goble, Alan. The Complete Index to Literary Sources in Film. Walter de Gruyter, 1999.
