= Monsieur Breloque Has Disappeared =

1938 film

- Directed by: Robert Péguy
- Written by: Jean Guitton
- Based on: Dicky by Paul Armont, Marcel Gerbidon and Jean Manoussi
- Produced by: Charles Battesti; Robert Péguy
- Starring: Lucien Baroux; Junie Astor; Suzy Pierson
- Cinematography: Jean Bachelet
- Music by: Henri Verdun
- Production company: B.A.P. Films
- Distributed by: D.U.C.
- Release date: 30 March 1938
- Running time: 95 minutes
- Country: France
- Language: French

Monsieur Breloque Has Disappeared (French: Monsieur Breloque a disparu) is a 1938 French comedy film directed by Robert Péguy and starring Lucien Baroux, Junie Astor and Suzy Pierson. It is an adaptation of the 1923 stage farce Dicky by Paul Armont, Marcel Gerbidon and Jean Manoussi. The film's sets were designed by the art director Émile Duquesne.

== Synopsis ==
The private detective Pierre Martel asks his friend Monsieur Breloque to take over his business for a short time. He is soon propelled into a series of misadventures.

== Cast ==
- Lucien Baroux as Monsieur Breloque
- Junie Astor as Francine
- Suzy Pierson as La comtesse de Brazeuil
- Marcel Simon as Le comte de Brazeuil
- Gabrielle Dorziat as La baronne Granger
- Foun-Sen as Thi-Hou
- André Bervil as Le détective Pierre Martel
- Marguerite Pierry Hermance Piegeois
- Jean Brochard
- Rivers Cadet
- Pauline Carton
- Paul Castan
- Raymond Galle as Le fils
- Claire Gérard
- Pierre Juvenet
- Charles Lemontier
- Jean Peyrière
- Elisa Ruis
- Robert Seller
- André Siméon

== Bibliography ==
- Bessy, Maurice & Chirat, Raymond. Histoire du cinéma français: encyclopédie des films, Volume 2. Pygmalion, 1986.
- Crisp, Colin. Genre, Myth and Convention in the French Cinema, 1929-1939. Indiana University Press, 2002.
- Rège, Philippe. Encyclopedia of French Film Directors, Volume 1. Scarecrow Press, 2009.
