= Prince Littler =

English theatrical producer (1901–1973)

Prince Frank Littler CBE (25 July 1901 – 1973) born Prince Frank Richeux, was an English theatre proprietor, impresario, and television executive.

== Life and career ==
Littler was born in Ramsgate, Kent, in the south east of England, the elder son in the family of five children of Jules Richeux (1863–1911), a cigar importer, and his wife, Agnes May, née Paisey (b. 1874). Richeux became a theatrical proprietor, leasing the Ramsgate Victoria Pavilion from 1906, while Agnes Richeux leased the Artillery Theatre, Woolwich, from 1909. After Richeux's death, his widow married, in 1914, the theatre manager Frank Rolison Littler (1879–1940), who adopted the five children, all of whom took his surname. The younger son Emile, and one of the daughters, Blanche, also went into theatrical management.

With Blanche, Littler started a theatrical career in 1927, assembling small companies for provincial tours. After a stint as resident manager of his parents' theatre in Woolwich, he became an independent theatre owner in 1931, buying two theatres in Leicester. The following year he married a widow, Annie Leonora Maclachlan, an actress, professionally known as Norah Delaney. There were no children of the marriage. Over the following years he bought theatres in Manchester and Norwich. His first London productions were pantomimes at the Coliseum, the Prince's, and Drury Lane.

Littler's West End shows included Glamorous Night (1936), Brigadoon (1950); Carousel, (1951); Guys and Dolls (1953), Can-Can (1954), The Black and White Minstrel Show and Fiddler on the Roof (both 1966). He presented more than 200 pantomimes in the regions, but unlike his younger brother, Emile, he played no part in writing any of his pantomimes, and concentrated wholly on the business side of the theatre.

Littler was chairman and managing director of three major theatre groups, chairman of a fourth (Moss Empires). From the beginning of commercial television in the UK, he was a major shareholder in Associated Television. He was a member of the council of the Theatrical Managers' Association, and vice-president of the boards of the Society of West End Theatre Managers, Denville Home for Aged Actors and Actresses and the Variety Artistes' Benevolent Fund. He served on the boards of the South Bank Theatre and the Royal Opera House.

In 1957, Littler was appointed CBE. He retired from production in 1966, and died at his home in Sussex in 1973 at the age of 72.
