= Robert J. Nelson =

Robert J. Nelson (May 20, 1873 – February 2, 1949) was a journalist, publisher, messenger, porter, and clerk who worked for the Department of Mines in Pennsylvania and was active as a community and civil rights leader. He lived in Harrisburg, Pennsylvania.

Born in Reading, Pennsylvania, he was described as being "mulatto". He attended the public schools in Reading. He was the youngest of 11 children. He co-founded and edited the Wilmington Advocate and later was an editor for the Washington Eagle. His first marriage was to Elizabeth Barber of Baltimore. They had a daughter Elizabeth and a son Robert Clarke (who died as a child). He was a member of the United Negro Republican Association. He served as preaident of the Douglas Publishing Company in Harrisburg.

He was a Grand Master of the Odd Fellows of Pennsylvania.

His second marriage was to Alice Dunbar-Nelson (1875-1935) on April 20, 1916. He was her third husband. She was the widow of Paul Lawrence Dunbar.

His wife compiled Masterpieces of Negro Eloquence and he published it in 1914.

He was part of the Colored Professionals and Businessman and was secretary for the Harrisburg NAACP. He served as president of the Harrisburg People's Forum and was a director for the Colored People for Independence.

He served as president of the Afro-American Republican League of Pennsylvania for at least three terms.

He was a clerk in Reading for the Department of Mines.

He belonged to the Capital Street Presbyterian Church and was involved in leading its Sunday School. He belonged to the Elks and was a member of the Mohican Club. In 1913 he won a lawsuit over segregation at the Victoria theatre.

== Publishings ==
- Masterpieces of Negro eloquence; the best speeches delivered by the Negro from the days of slavery to the present time edited by Alice Moore Dunbar.
