= The French Doll =

1923 silent film

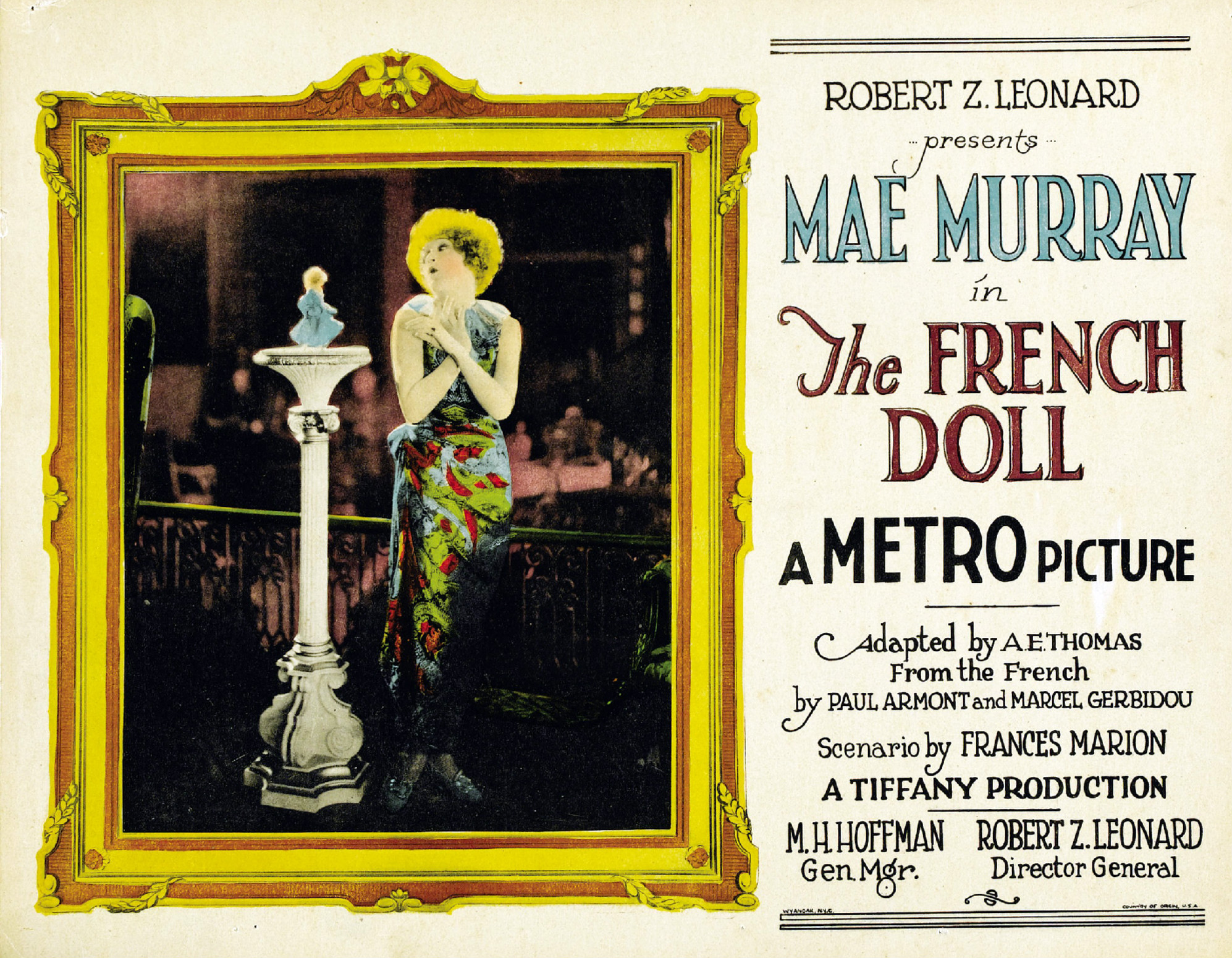
- Lobby card
- Directed by: Robert Z. Leonard
- Written by: Frances Marion
- Produced by: Robert Z. Leonard
- Starring: Mae Murray; Orville Caldwell; Rod La Rocque
- Cinematography: Oliver T. Marsh
- Production company: Tiffany Pictures
- Distributed by: Metro Pictures
- Release date: September 3, 1923
- Running time: 70 minutes
- Country: United States
- Language: Silent (English intertitles)

The French Doll is a 1923 American silent comedy drama film directed by Robert Z. Leonard and starring Mae Murray, Orville Caldwell, and Rod La Rocque. It was based on a French-language novel by Paul Armont and Marcel Gerbidon.

== Cast ==
- Mae Murray as Georgine Mazulier
- Orville Caldwell as Wellington Wick
- Rod La Rocque as Pedro Carrova
- Rose Dione as Madame Mazuloier
- Paul Cazeneuve as Monsieur Mazulier
- Willard Louis as Joseph Dumas
- Bernard Randall as Snyder
- Lucien Littlefield as Dobbs, the Butler

== Preservation ==
A print of The French Doll is held by Gosfilmofond.

== Bibliography ==
- Goble, Alan. The Complete Index to Literary Sources in Film. Walter de Gruyter, 1999.
