= The Hotel Mouse =

1923 film

- Directed by: Fred Paul
- Written by: Paul Armont (play Souris d'hôtel); Marcel Gerbidon (play Souris d'hôtel) Walter Summers
- Produced by: G.B. Samuelson
- Starring: Lillian Hall-Davis; Campbell Gullan; Warwick Ward; Josephine Earle
- Production company: British-Super Films
- Distributed by: Jury Films
- Release date: July 1923
- Country: United Kingdom
- Language: English

The Hotel Mouse is a 1923 British silent crime film directed by Fred Paul and starring Lillian Hall-Davis, Campbell Gullan and Warwick Ward. It was based on a play by Paul Armont and Marcel Gerbidon.

== Cast ==
- Lillian Hall-Davis - Mauricette
- Campbell Gullan - Merchant
- Warwick Ward - Estaban
- Josephine Earle - Lola
- Morgan Wallace - Honorable Harry Hurlingham
