= Emile Littler =

English theatrical impresario, producer and author

Emile Littler

Sir Emile Littler (9 September 1903 – 23 January 1985), born Emile Richeux, was an English theatrical impresario, producer and author.

== Life and career ==
Littler was born in Ramsgate, Kent, in the south east of England, the younger son in the family of five children of Jules Richeux (1863–1911), a cigar importer, and his wife, Agnes May, née Paisey (b. 1874). Richeux became a theatrical proprietor, leasing the Ramsgate Victoria Pavilion from 1906, while Agnes Richeux leased the Royal Artillery Theatre, Woolwich, from 1909. In 1914, three years after Richeux's death, his widow married the theatre manager Frank Rolison Littler (1879–1940), who adopted the five children, all of whom took his surname. The elder son Prince, and one of the daughters, Blanche, also went into theatrical management. After private education at Stratford-upon-Avon and a brief start as an actor, Littler turned to backstage work, serving as assistant manager of a theatre in Southend-on-Sea in 1922, and then as assistant stage manager of Sir Barry Jackson's Birmingham Repertory Theatre. He worked in the US for four years between 1927 and 1931, for managements including the Shuberts, and after returning to Britain he became manager and licensee of the Birmingham Rep in September 1931.

In 1933 Littler married the actress Cora Goffin; there were two daughters of the marriage. The following year he set up in management on his own account. His theatrical productions included: Victoria Regina, 1066 and All That, Once in a Lifetime, Song of Norway, Annie Get Your Gun and Zip Goes a Million, and revivals of The Maid of the Mountains, The Quaker Girl, Lilac Time, The Student Prince and The Desert Song. Littler presented more than two hundred Christmas pantomimes in London and the larger cities of the British Isles; he was author or co-author of many of them. He controlled the Palace Theatre, London from 1946 to 1983 and had two stints as President of the Society of West End Theatre Managers: 1964–67 and 1969–70. He also served on the board of the Royal Shakespeare Theatre, Stratford-upon-Avon. He was a racehorse owner, owning the horses Jack & Jill, Astafa, and Irish Ball.

Littler retired from producing in 1973 and was knighted the following year. He died at his home in Sussex at the age of 81.
