= Charlotte Mary Matheson =

English novelist

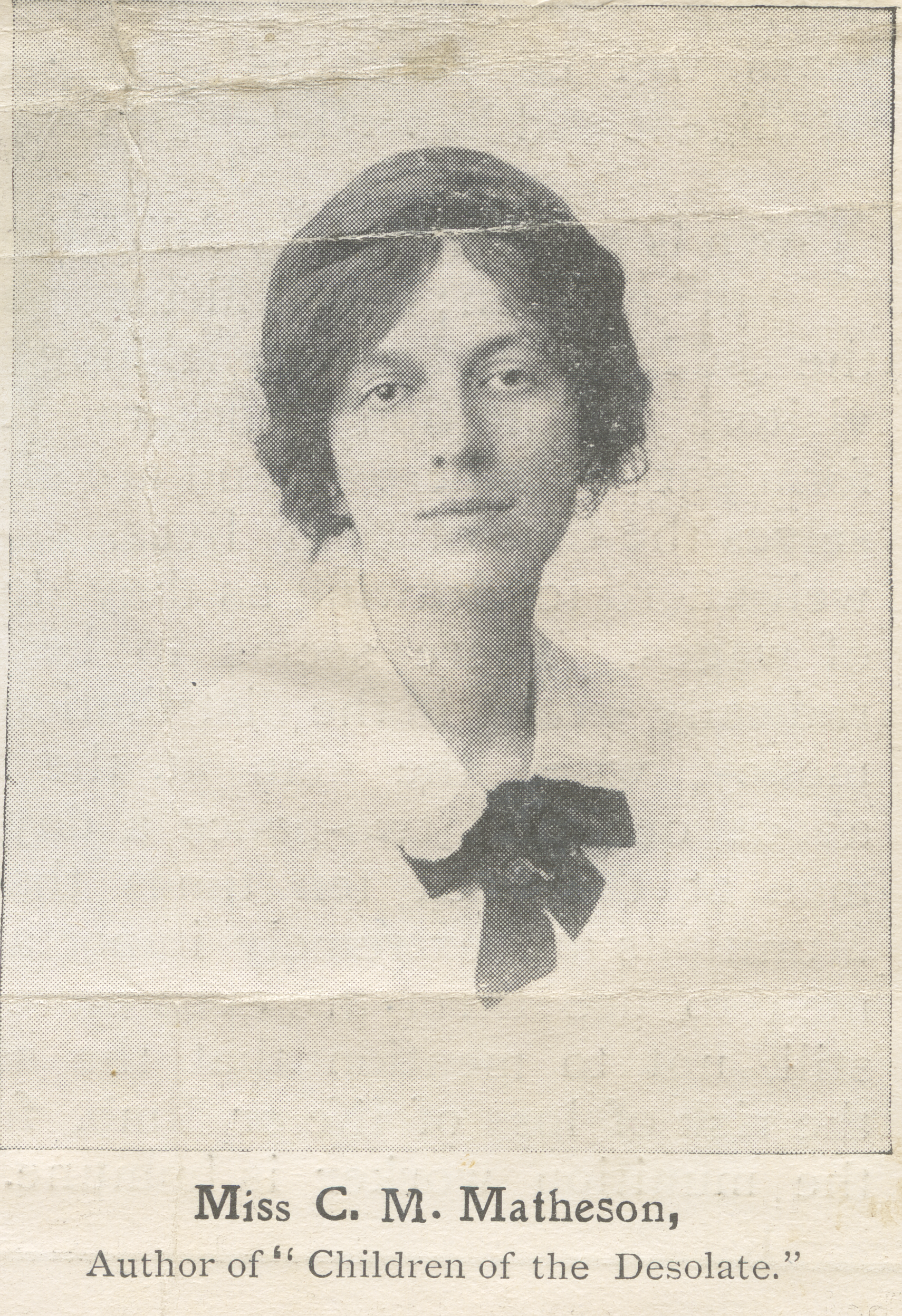
- Charlotte in a 1916 publicity photo
- Born: 1888 or 1889; England
- Died: 8 April 1937 (aged 48); Cornwall, England
- Resting place: St. Columb Minor Church, Cornwall
- Occupation: Novelist
- Notable work: The Generation Between (1915), Children of the Desolate (1916), Morwenna of the Green Gown (1923), Nut in the Husk (1926), The Feather (1927)
- Spouse: Stanley Threlkeld
- Children: Stephen, Felicity
- Parent(s): Frank and Charlotte Elizabeth (née Wenmoth) Matheson

Charlotte Mary Matheson (died 8 April 1937 in Cornwall, England) was a Cornish novelist. She wrote The Generation Between (1915), Children of the Desolate (1916), Morwenna of the Green Gown (1923), Nut in the Husk (1926), and The Feather (1927).

== Early life ==
Charlotte was the daughter of Frank and Charlotte Elizabeth (née Wenmoth) Matheson. Her exact date of birth is unknown; however her gravestone states she died at the age of 48 which puts her date of birth in either 1889 or 1888. This corresponds with her appearance in the 1891 England, Wales & Scotland Census where she is listed as 3 years of age. However, according to the Library of Congress Catalog of Copyright entries she was born in 1892.

== Novels ==
=== The Generation Between (1915) ===
Tatler: "One of the most successful novels of the season. The season so far has not given us a more readable one, or one more intensely interesting from beginning to end." Quoted in the front pages of Children of the Desolate published 1916, T. Fisher Unwin, Ltd.

In The Generation Between the heroine Thomasine searches for freedom and happiness in early 20th century England. She is 17 when the novel begins. The novel explores discrimination and prejudice against women in England at that time, and feminist ideas. For a time Thomasine stays at the fictional community of Dyleshart, a new all women town run entirely by women, with accompanying gardens and farmlands. The title refers to the generation of women between the dying "old way" and a predicted future of much more equality and freedom for women. Thomasine says: "... We are betwixt and between. The old way is over, the new way is come. We're bearing the brunt of it. We're the generation between." (p. 70)

=== Children of the Desolate (1916) ===
Some reviews of Children of the Desolate when it came out in August 1916:

The Scotsman: It should be difficult to miss the note of distinction in this story which both in conception and in execution shows skilful and conscientious workmanship. Parts of the narrative may perhaps appear overstrained, but they are thoroughly consistent with the highly emotional type of character which the author has chosen to study, while the story is free from the moral unpleasantness often associated with this type of heroine. Miss Matheson follows the career of her study from infancy to maturity; shows her an impulsive, passionate, and imaginative child; traces the development of her artistic gifts - which border on genius - side by side with the growth of an idealistic nature, marred by vanity and petulance; and, finally, leaves her as a great artist, with a happy family of children whom she has adopted in obedience to the Madonna spirit within her. The character of the heroine is alternately attractive and repellant; but at all points she is real and interesting, and her life story, which is skilfully designed in harmony with her conflicting impulses and instincts, will prove attractive enough for readers who are less interested in character than in external changes of fortune.

Leeds Post via a Facebook photo: "The woman whose figure dominates "Children of the Desolate" ... by C. M. Matheson, is a strange and complex personality. She is blessed - or cursed - with a vivid imagination, she is a creature of impulse, capable of infinite good or unutterably bad things. Brought up without sympathy or understanding, she loses all self-control, she obeys the worst impulses, she marries a man for whom she has no love, nor even respect, for the sake of his money, and she tastes the bitter fruit of a loveless marriage. ... It is a powerful novel, noble in sentiment, and without a shade of priggishness in its profound morality."

Empress (Calcutta): "...a novel of vivid and absorbing interest."

The Age (Melbourne): "... The heroine of 'Children of the Desolate' fights against forces within herself for a spiritual ideal that she visions but cannot describe ..."

Melbourne Leader: "A new volume in Unwin's Colonial Library is Miss C. M. Matheson's novel 'Children of the Desolate.' The heroine is a high spirited, emotional, artistic girl, intensely modern, beating against the walls of a narrow, provincial home environment. ..."

=== Morwenna of the Green Gown (1923) ===
Description of the novel from "Messrs. Hurst & Blackett's Announcements for the AUTUMN 1922" p. 15: "A story of Dartmoor and London. Morwenna, with Spanish blood on her father's side, is adopted by her uncle and brought up on his farm. She has a lover in Ben, a young farmer, and she is also made love to by a fascinating philanderer [a well-read London artist], Ross, who tries hard to persuade her to go with him in an irregular position. Hard driven, she weds Ben, but her life becomes unbearable. She flies to London, and there meets with strange [interesting] experiences before her ultimate return to Dartmoor to pick up the broken thread of her life. The author knows her Dartmoor thoroughly and the people are alive, the heroine Morwenna, being a particularly well drawn and interesting character."

The novel begins during World War One when men are still being called up to serve at the front. The heroine Morwenna has grown up in a large Dartmoor farming family into which she has been adopted by her uncle. Her parents died when she was little.

The title refers to the heroine's green gown which, due to her uncle's lack of funds, is in the early part of the novel the only gown (dress) she has. It has become old, faded, and too small for her. The tightness and the adjustments she has made to help it fit better, such as a slit, flatteringly show her attractive form, very much to the annoyance of her uncle's wife who is resentful and hostile towards her, but not at all to the annoyance of any of the men who meet her.

Morwenna's life in Devon becomes intolerable to her after her marriage to Ben. She flees to London by train, and as the story unfolds becomes well acquainted with an actress flatmate, a prominent designer of gowns and women's clothes who falls in love with her, artists, aristocrats and revolutionaries. On an unusual business arrangement she visits a country estate in Yorkshire, but after taking part in a joyful and dramatic fox hunt that ends in disaster she cannot bare to stay. The story throughout is engaging and interesting, the characters, as the Hurst & Blackett description suggests, are alive and well drawn.

As of March 2014, it has not been republished and is not available for online download.

=== Nut in the Husk (1926) ===
The novel tells the story of the heroine's remarkable life starting with her birth in the 1890s on a stormy night at her parents' house in the Cornwall countryside. She is home schooled by a governess, and then at age 15 sent for two years to a fashionable "finishing school" which her parents can only afford with considerable sacrifice, and which is designed to prepare girls from the upper strata of English society for the "marriage market." She is her parents' only child and feels entrapped by her father's dream for her, which is that she marry someone very wealthy so she can "regain" for herself the ancestral country estate of her father's family which was lost following the death of her grandfather decades before she was born when her father was a boy of 15.

She does surprisingly well at marrying into wealth and realizing her father's dream, but she does so with deep misgivings which she hides from her father. The marriage after a few months of unexpected happiness proves very problematic.

The story is engaging from the heroine's childhood in the Cornish countryside, to the fashionable girls school with its cliques and conflicts, the country estates of her later teens, her unhappy marriage into wealth and privilege, her extra-marital affair, and the extreme moral dilemma she faces at the end of World War One. The diverse characters are interesting and clearly portrayed.

Like other C. M. Matheson novels, one of the ongoing themes is a love of nature, the English countryside, farms and farming, gardens and gardening, country houses and estates. Apart from the heroine's time at school it is set almost entirely in the countryside of Cornwall, Kent and Sussex.

The novel's title is a quote from the opening stanza of Robert Louis Stevenson's poem "If This Were Faith." Part of that stanza (including the line "Nut in the husk") is quoted on a page at the start of the book before the novel starts. In the novel the heroine quotes the second and third last lines of the poem's last stanza (p. 265) to express some of her best hopes for the future. ("If This Were Faith" is available online at poetrylovers.com.)

=== The Feather (1927) ===
The Feather was made into a movie of the same name (The Feather) in 1929. It was made as a silent movie, with sound effects and music added after filming. It was not commercially competitive with the new talkies that had started coming out.

The original English language version of the novel is not currently (September 2014) available in republication nor for online download.

The novel is a love story between the two main characters.

It begins with one of them, disgraced and dismissed insurance adjuster Roger Dalton, being sentenced to three years in prison for stealing (embezzlement) from his employer. "... he did not seem to care [about the sentence]. Indeed, as he turned to step from the dock and pass from the court that bitter afternoon, he straightened his shoulders and drew himself up as if with pride and satisfaction - as though what he had done was a worthy achievement."

None of the stolen money is ever recovered by the authorities. As the novel unfolds we learn the reason for the theft and the transformative use to which the money was put.

Roger Dalton and the other main character Mavis Cotterell meet in the course of his work, and fall very much in love. She is a bright spiritually inclined Roman Catholic, who shows not the slightest regard for the moral teachings of the church. Roger Dalton's wife and teenage daughter never learn of the affair, and more or less disown him after his arrest.

One of the main female characters had, we learn, planned and carried out the murder of her abusive husband who she was coerced into marrying at age 16, successfully passing it off as death by natural causes, even though his doctor believes otherwise and refuses to issue a death certificate. She has no regrets, and none of the characters who find out give the slightest thought to reporting the crime to the police.

== Life ==
=== Women's Land Army in World War One ===
The Times 27 November 1916: "WOMAN NOVELIST AS HERDSMAN. Miss C. M. Matheson, a promising author of the younger school, has for nearly a year been acting as under-herdsman on the Prince of Wales's farm on the Duchy Estate at Stoke Climsland, Cornwall. Miss Matheson, whose 'A Generation Between' and 'Children of the Desolate' (Fisher Unwin) - the latter published this year - have attained wide popularity, has proved a capable understudy in the management of the famous herd of pure-bred Shorthorns owned by the Prince, taking a share in all kinds of work, heavy and light."

Glasgow Bulletin 16 December 1916, from photo caption under a photo of C.M. Matheson with bulls at the Prince's Cornwall farm: "...Miss Matheson, a well-known writer, who has charge of a number of precious animals on the Prince of Wales's Cornish farm. It is said that she walks the bulls like another young lady might walk foxhound puppies."

Illustrated Western Weekly, 23 December 1916: "Miss Matheson, a well-known writer, is a "herdsman" on the Prince of Wales' farm at Stokeclimsland. She has many bulls in her charge one of which alone is worth 600 guineas. She takes the bulls for a walk each day when the weather is suitable. She is the only woman herdsman existing."

Express & Echo (1917 or 1916, exact date?): "Miss C.M. Matheson, the novelist, who is filling the position of under-herdsman on the Duchy Farm in Cornwall, has taken to her work so kindly as to find it quite engrossing. We have heard a good deal about objections to milking, yet Miss Matheson's attitude is quite the opposite. 'Last year,' she says in the 'Star' (London), 'I worked for some months for a dairy farmer in Wiltshire. He had forty to fifty cows in milk, and, despite that experience, I can truly say that milking is an exceedingly pleasurable duty. But the milker must be interested not only in her task, but in the animal itself. To the outsider cows seem stolid, expressionless beasts. To anyone who has worked with them they become real personalities, each with her own charactersistics.'"

These experiences were part of her service in the Women's Land Army or Women's National Land Service Corps in First World War England.

=== Marriage, children and Porth Veor ===
She married Stanley Threlkeld in the early 1920s after he returned from living in India where he had taught agriculture at a boys school (for the children of Scottish fathers and Indian mothers, funded from Scotland) and was in the British Indian Army. They had two children, Stephen on 27 December 1924, Felicity on 1 April 1926, and lived at and ran Porth Veor Manor Hotel (including Porth Cottage) in Newquay overlooking Porth Beach and the sea on a beautiful portion of the Cornwall coast. She lived at Porth Veor Hotel with her husband and children until her death from breast cancer on 8 April 1937. She is buried a short drive from Porth Veor Hotel at the cemetery at St. Columb Minor Church, Cornwall, England.

=== Miscellany ===
She appears in A & C Black's Who's Who from 1919 to 1934. The listing in the 1919 edition reads: "MATHESON, C. M.; b. near Liskeard; unmarried. Took up work on the land as war work, 1915; trained at Sparsholt, Winchester; Member of Women's National Land Service Corps; employed first on Wiltshire Dairy Farm, then by the Prince of Wales in Cornwall (as herdswoman); very enthusiastic with regard to training and stock rearing. Publications: The Generation Between, 1915; Children of the Desolate, 1916; The Silver Cord, 1919. Address: The Lodge, Princetown, Devon."

In November 1915 she was appointed to an advisory committee on drinking among women. The Times: "The Central Control Board (Liquor Traffic) has decided, with the concurrence of the Minister of Munitions, to appoint a committee 'to inquire into and advise the Board regarding the alleged excessive drinking among women, and to suggest what action, if any, is required in the interest of national efficiency.' ... The following have agreed to serve on the committee: ... Miss C. M. Matheson ..."

February 1918, "LADY NOVELIST PRESENTED" "Among the many people presented to his Royal Highness during the day was Miss. Matheson, the writer of several novels, who formerly was herdswoman on the Duchy Farm at Stokeclimsland. She was warmly congratulated upon her versatile accomplishments." The short article continues letting us know that afterwards "the Prince motored back to Princetown, which was reached in time for tea." Western Daily Mercury, "LADY NOVELIST PRESENTED" 23 February 1918.

At a drama presentation of the Princetown Women's Institute, September 1920: "... For the nine acted scenes, of which the most interesting were of the French revolutionary trial from Dickens's 'Tale of Two Cities,' the audience was much indebted to Miss. C. M. Matheson (Plymouth), who charmed the spectators in her successive roles of Milliner, Rustic Lover, 'Evremond,' victim at the Bloc, Nun, Jewel Thief, and Gypsy. Mrs. Dowse contributed appropriate music." Western Morning News, "VILLAGE DRAMA" 18 September 1920.
