= Partners in Crime (1961 film) =

British film by Peter Duffell

- Directed by: Peter Duffell
- Written by: Robert Banks Stewart
- Based on: The Man Who Knew by Edgar Wallace
- Produced by: Jack Greenwood; Jim O'Connolly
- Starring: Bernard Lee; Moira Redmond; John Van Eyssen
- Cinematography: Bert Mason
- Edited by: Edward B. Jarvis
- Music by: Ron Goodwin
- Production company: Merton Park Studios
- Distributed by: Anglo-Amalgamated
- Release date: February 1961
- Running time: 54 minutes
- Country: United Kingdom
- Language: English

Partners in Crime is a 1961 British second feature ('B') crime film directed by Peter Duffell and starring Bernard Lee, Moira Redmond and John Van Eyssen. The screenplay was by Robert Banks Stewart, based on the 1918 Edgar Wallace novel The Man Who Knew. It is part of the series of Edgar Wallace Mysteries films made at Merton Park Studios from 1960 to 1965.

== Plot ==
The plot revolves around control of the soft drink company Cool Kups following the murder of the company chairman Harold Strickland. During the police investigation the company is temporarily controlled by Frank Merril.

== Cast ==
- Bernard Lee as Inspector Mann
- Moira Redmond as Freda Strickland
- John Van Eyssen as Merril
- Stanley Morgan as Sergeant Rutledge
- Gordon Boyd as Rex Holland
- Mark Singleton as Shilton
- Victor Platt as Harold Strickland
- Danny Sewell as Avery
- Robert Sansom as doctor
- Nicholas Smith as pawn shop assistant
- Ernest Clark as Ashton
- Richard Shaw as Bill Cross
- Graham Leaman as ballistics scientist
- Hilary Martyn as Rita
- Clive Marshall as Tony Hart
- Ruth Meyers as Mary Nuttal
- Larry Martyn as Pete Lake
- Deidre Day as secretary
- Peter Howard-Johnson as police sergeant

== Reception ==
The Monthly Film Bulletin wrote: "Unexciting addition to the Edgar Wallace series, with little or no subtlety or originality. Bernard Lee is adequate as the Inspector, and Graham Leaman makes much of a tiny part as a Yard ballistics expert."
