= Alice Dunbar Nelson =

American journalist, poet and activist (1875–1935)

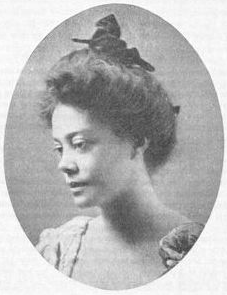
- Nelson in c. 1902
- Born: Alice Ruth Moore; July 19, 1875; New Orleans, Louisiana, US
- Died: September 18, 1935 (aged 60); Philadelphia, Pennsylvania, US
- Education: Straight University; Cornell University
- Occupations: Poet; journalist; political activist
- Spouse(s): Paul Laurence Dunbar (m. 1898; died 1906) Henry A. Callis (m. 1910; div. 1916) Robert J. Nelson (m. 1916)

Alice Dunbar Nelson (July 19, 1875 – September 18, 1935) was an American poet, journalist, and political activist. Among the first generation of African Americans born free in the Southern United States after the end of the American Civil War, she was one of the prominent African Americans involved in the artistic flourishing of the Harlem Renaissance. She gained recognition for her poetry, short stories, and essays that explored themes of race, gender, and respectability; for her journalism and newspaper columns advocating for Black women's rights and anti-lynching legislation; and for her editorial work on two influential anthologies that highlighted African American literature.

== Early life and background ==
Alice Ruth Moore was born on July 19, 1875, in New Orleans, Louisiana, into a family with a complex racial and ethnic background. Her mother, Patricia Wright, was a former slave and Alice's upbringing in the South during the post-Reconstruction era had a significant influence on her later works. Growing up in a city with a history of mixed-race relationships, Alice's identity as both Black and Creole shaped her perspectives on race, identity, and social norms, themes she would later explore in her writing.

=== Personal life ===
Moore graduated from the teaching program at Straight University (later merged into Dillard University) in 1892 following years of exceptional academic performance and showcasing her musical talent by playing the piano, mandolin, and cello. As a 17-year-old college graduate she worked as a teacher in the public school system of New Orleans at Old Marigny Elementary. Nelson lived in New Orleans for twenty-one years.

In 1895, The Monthly Review published Alice Dunbar Nelson's first collection of short stories and poems, Violets and Other Tales. Although her first collection received criticism, she remained committed to succeed as a writer. Striving for a career in writing Moore moved to Boston in the late 1890s. In 1897 after moving to New York City. she co-founded and taught at the White Rose Mission (White Rose Home for Girls) in Manhattan's San Juan Hill neighborhood, beginning a correspondence with the poet and journalist Paul Laurence Dunbar. Alice Dunbar Nelson's work in The Woman's Era captured Paul Laurence Dunbar's attention. On April 17, 1895, Paul Laurence Dunbar sent Alice a letter of introduction, which was the first of many letters that the two exchanged. In their letters, Paul asked Alice about her interest in the race question. She responded that she thought of her characters as "simple human beings," and believed that many writers focused on race too closely. Although her later race-focused writings would dispute this fact, Alice's opinion on the race problem contradicted Paul Laurence's. Despite contradictory opinions about the representation of race in literature, the two continued to communicate romantically through their letters.

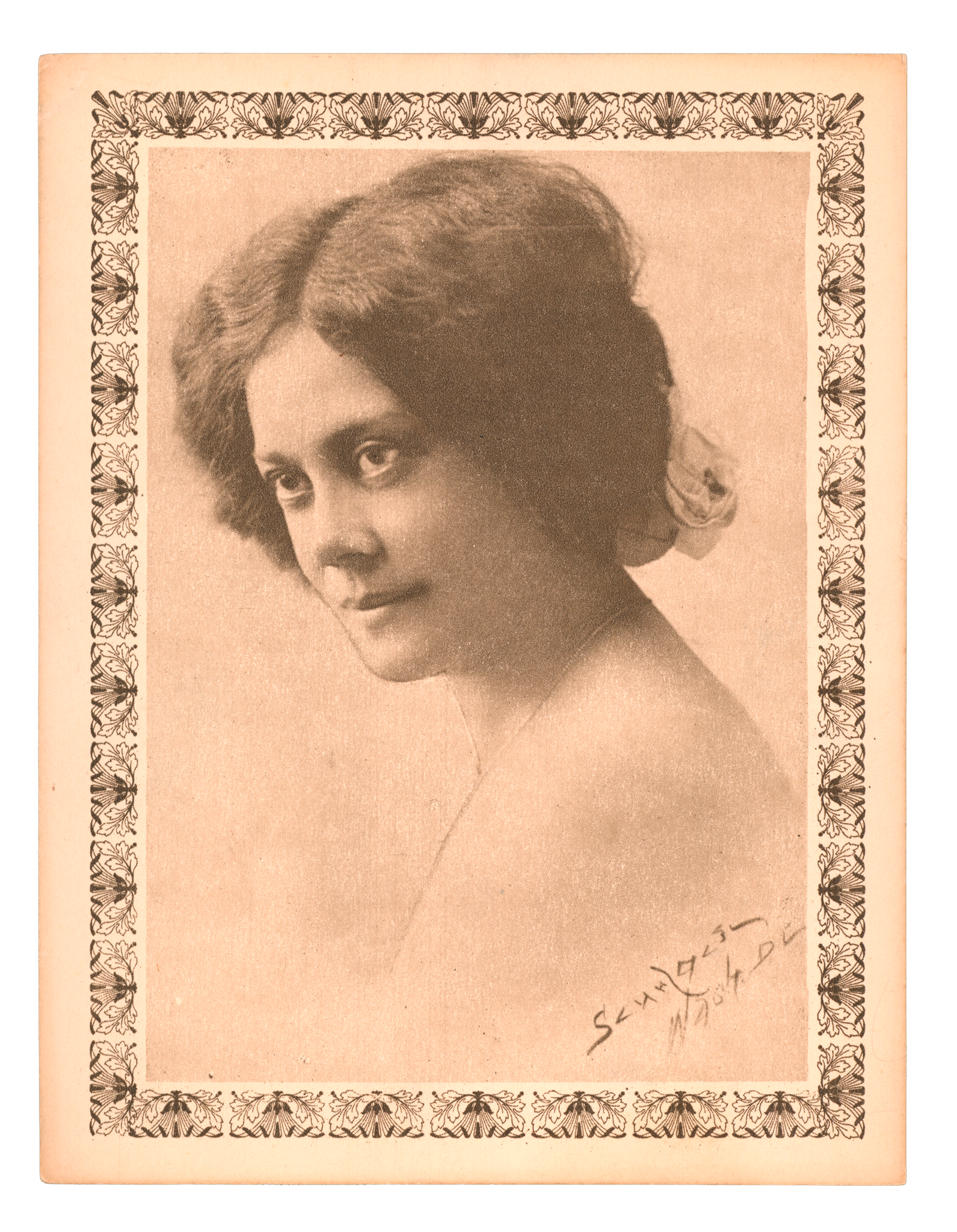
Alice Dunbar Nelson, circa 1900

Their correspondence revealed tensions about the sexual freedoms of men and women. Before their marriage, Paul told Alice that she kept him from "yielding to temptations," a reference to sexual liaisons. In a letter from March 6, 1896, Paul may have attempted to instigate jealousy in Alice by talking about a woman he had met in Paris. However, Alice failed to respond to these attempts and continued to maintain an emotional distance from Paul. In 1898, after corresponding for a few years, Alice moved to Washington, D.C. to join Paul Laurence Dunbar and they secretly eloped in 1898. Their relationship, as documented in their letters, reflected both deep affection and significant emotional strain. Dunbar-Nelson often found herself navigating the tension between her intellectual independence and the expectations placed on her as a wife, particularly as a Black woman in the late 19th century. Paul Laurence Dunbar's struggles with alcoholism, depression, and possessiveness contributed to the deterioration of their marriage. Their correspondence offers insight into the emotional and social pressures that shaped their union and its eventual breakdown. Prior to their marriage, Paul raped Alice, which he later blamed on his alcoholism. Alice eventually forgave him for this behavior. However, their relationship characterized by many instances of physical abuse by Paul which was public knowledge. In a later message to Dunbar's earliest biographer, Alice said, "He came home one night in a beastly condition. I went to him to help him to bed—and he behaved as your informant said, disgracefully." She also claimed to have been "ill for weeks with peritonitis brought on by his kicks." In 1902, after he nearly beat her to death, she left him. There is evidence that Dunbar-Nelson's close relationships with women, including her emotional and romantic connections, may have contributed to tensions in their marriage. They never resumed companionate living, but also never divorced before Paul Dunbar's death in 1906.

After Paul Dunbar's death, Dunbar-Nelson formed a significant relationship with Edwina Kruse, an educator and fellow advocate for African American rights. This relationship, while not widely documented, influenced Dunbar-Nelson's later writing and intellectual engagement. In her unpublished novel This Lofty Oak, Dunbar-Nelson explored themes of love, respectability, and identity, which were informed by her personal experiences.

In 1902, after leaving Paul Dunbar, Alice moved to Wilmington, Delaware, where she rebuilt her personal and professional life. She began teaching at Howard High School, a role she would hold for over a decade. During this period, she also taught summer sessions at State College for Colored Students (the predecessor of Delaware State University) and the Hampton Institute. In 1907, she took a leave of absence from her Wilmington teaching position and enrolled at Cornell University, returning to Wilmington in 1908. In 1910, she married Henry A. Callis, a prominent physician and professor at Howard University, but this marriage ended in divorce.

In 1916, she married the poet and civil rights activist Robert J. Nelson of Harrisburg, Pennsylvania. She worked with him to publish the play Masterpieces of Negro Experience (1914), which was only shown once at Howard High School in Wilmington. She joined him in becoming active in local and regional politics. They stayed together for the rest of their lives.

In 1930, Nelson traveled throughout the country lecturing, covering thousands of miles and presenting at thirty-seven educational institutions. Nelson also spoke at YWCAs, YMCAs, and churches, and frequently at Wesley Union African Methodist Episcopal Zion Church in Harrisburg. Her achievements were documented by Friends Service Committee Newsletter.

== Sexuality and relationships ==
While it is impossible to be certain about a historical figure's sexuality and identity without a direct statement, a number of historians, such as LGBTQ+ specialist Lillian Fadiman, have suggested that Dunbar-Nelson was bisexual. Evidence for this includes entries from Dunbar-Nelson's diary, one of which reads, “Love and beautiful love has been mine from many men, but the great passion of four or five transcended that of other women — and what more can any woman want?”. One implication of this entry is that Dunbar-Nelson may have had relationships with both men and women. Regardless, Dunbar-Nelson is documented via letters and diary entries as having had several close relationships with women. These included Edwina Kruse, journalist Fay M. Jackson, and a poet artist named Helene Ricks London. An unpublished poem of Dunbar Nelson's, You! Inez!, seems to express a desire for a woman named Inez, whose true identity remains unknown. Dunbar-Nelson herself never publicly labeled or discussed her sexuality, most likely due to homosexual relationships being criminalised in the US during her lifetime.

=== Early activism ===
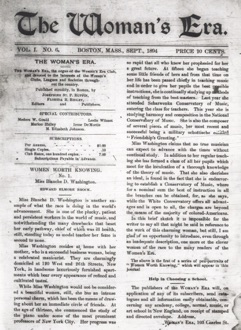
An excerpt from The Woman's Era, the newspaper which acted as the foundation for Alice's long career as a journalist and activist.

Her early activism focused on empowering Black women through education, journalism, and civic engagement. In 1894, she became a charter member of the Phillis Wheatley Club in New Orleans, contributing her writing skills. She worked with the Woman's Era Club's monthly newspaper, The Woman's Era. Targeting refined and educated women, it was the first newspaper for and by African American women. Alice's work with the paper marked the beginning of her career as a journalist and an activist.

Dunbar-Nelson was an activist for African Americans' and women's rights, especially during the 1920s and 1930s. While she continued to write stories and poetry, she became more politically active in Wilmington, and put more effort into journalism on leading topics. In 1914, she co-founded the Equal Suffrage Study Club, and in 1915, she was a field organizer for the Middle Atlantic states for the women's suffrage movement. In 1918, she was field representative for the Woman's Committee of the Council of Defense. In 1924, Dunbar-Nelson campaigned for the passage of the Dyer Anti-Lynching Bill, but the Southern Democratic block in Congress defeated it. During this time, Dunbar-Nelson worked in various ways to foster political change. It is said, "She stayed very active in the NAACP; she cofounded a much-needed reform school in Delaware for African American girls; she worked for the American Friends Inter-Racial Peace Committee; she spoke at rallies against the sentencing of the Scottsboro defendants."

=== Journalism work and continued activism ===
From 1913 to 1914, Dunbar-Nelson was co-editor and writer for the A.M.E. Church Review, an influential church publication produced by the African Methodist Episcopal Church (AME Church). From 1920, she coedited the Wilmington Advocate, a progressive black newspaper. She also published The Dunbar Speaker and Entertainer, a literary anthology for a black audience.

Alice Dunbar-Nelson supported American involvement in World War I; she saw the war as a means to ending racial violence in America. She organized events to encourage other African Americans to support the war. She referenced the war in a number of her works. In her 1918 poem "I Sit and Sew," Nelson writes from the perspective of a woman who feels suppressed from engaging directly with the war effort. Because she was not able to enlist in the war herself, Nelson wrote propagandistic pieces such as Mine Eyes Have Seen (1918), a play that encouraged African American men to enlist in the army. These works display Nelson's belief that racial equality could be achieved through military service and sacrificing one's self to their nation.

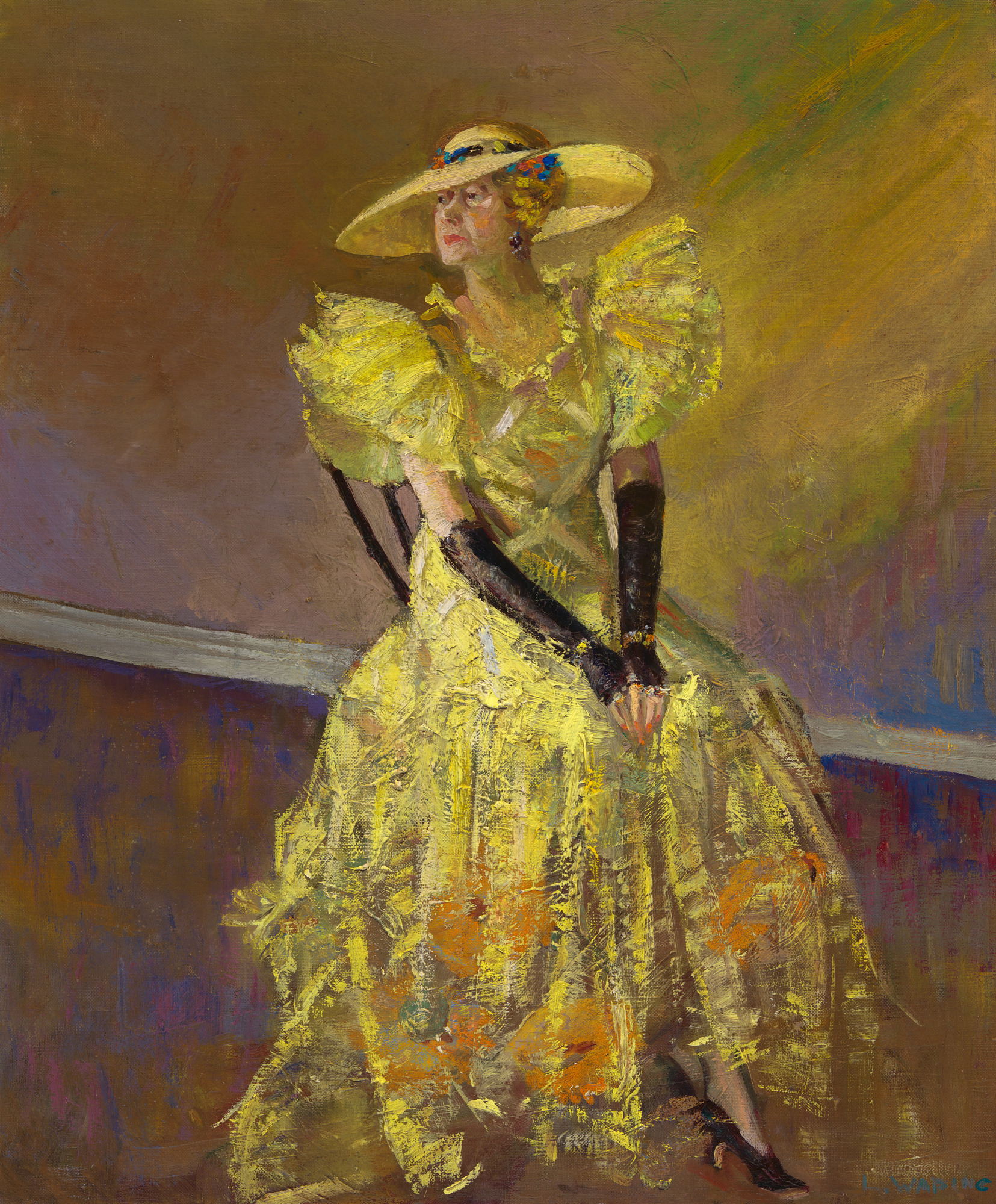
1927 portrait of Alice Dunbar Nelson by Laura Wheeler Waring

From about 1920 on, Dunbar-Nelson was a successful columnist, with her articles, essays and reviews appearing in newspapers, magazines, and academic journals. She was a popular speaker and had an active schedule of lectures through these years. Her journalism career had a rocky beginning. During the late 19th century, it was unusual for women to work outside of the home, let alone an African American woman, and journalism was a hostile, male-dominated field. In her diary, she spoke about the tribulations associated with the profession: "Damn bad luck I have with my pen. Some fate has decreed I shall never make money by it" (Diary, 366). She discusses being denied pay for her articles and issues she had with receiving proper recognition for her work. Beyond her published essays and columns, Dunbar-Nelson used journalism as a form of advocacy. Her writings addressed racial violence, gender inequality, and educational injustice, particularly targeting issues affecting Black women. She was known for strategically using public platforms to challenge respectability politics and elevate the voices of African American women in political debates. Her ‘As In A Looking Glass’ column in the Washington Eagle frequently blended personal narrative with social critique, offering commentary on everything from anti-lynching campaigns to working-class labor conditions. In 1920, Nelson was removed from teaching at Howard High School for attending Social Justice Day on October 1 against the will of Principal Ray Wooten. Wooten states that Nelson was removed for "political activity" and incompatibility. Despite the backing of the Board of Education's Conwell Banton, who opposed Nelson's firing, Nelson decided not to return to Howard High School. In 1928, Nelson became Executive Secretary of the American Friends Inter-Racial Peace Committee. In 1928, Nelson also spoke on The American Negro Labor Congress Forum in Philadelphia. Nelson's topic was Inter-Racial Peace and its Relation to Labor. In her role as Executive Secretary of the American Friends Inter-Racial Peace Committee, Dunbar-Nelson organized forums and speaking tours promoting racial reconciliation, labor rights, and women's civic engagement. She often addressed interracial audiences, pushing for cooperative labor organizing and education reform. Her work bridged movements for racial justice and labor equity, reflecting her belief that peace and economic justice were interconnected. Dunbar-Nelson also wrote for the Washington Eagle, contributing "As In A Looking Glass" columns from 1926 to 1930.

=== Later life and death ===
She moved from Delaware to Philadelphia in 1932, when her husband joined the Pennsylvania Athletic Commission. Following the move her health declined. She died from a heart ailment on September 18, 1935, at the age of 60. She was cremated in Philadelphia. She was made an honorary member of Delta Sigma Theta sorority. Her papers are considered one of the most substantial and comprehensive archives of an early African American woman writer in the United States. Her work has been preserved through the dedication of her niece, and these materials now reside in the University of Delaware's Special Collections library, ensuring her legacy and insights endure.

Her diary, published in 1984, detailed her life during the years 1921 and 1926 to 1931 and provided useful insight into the lives of black women during this time. It "summarizes her position in an era during which law and custom limited access, expectations, and opportunities for black women." Her diary addressed issues such as family, friendship, sexuality, health, professional problems, travels, and often financial difficulties.

== Context ==
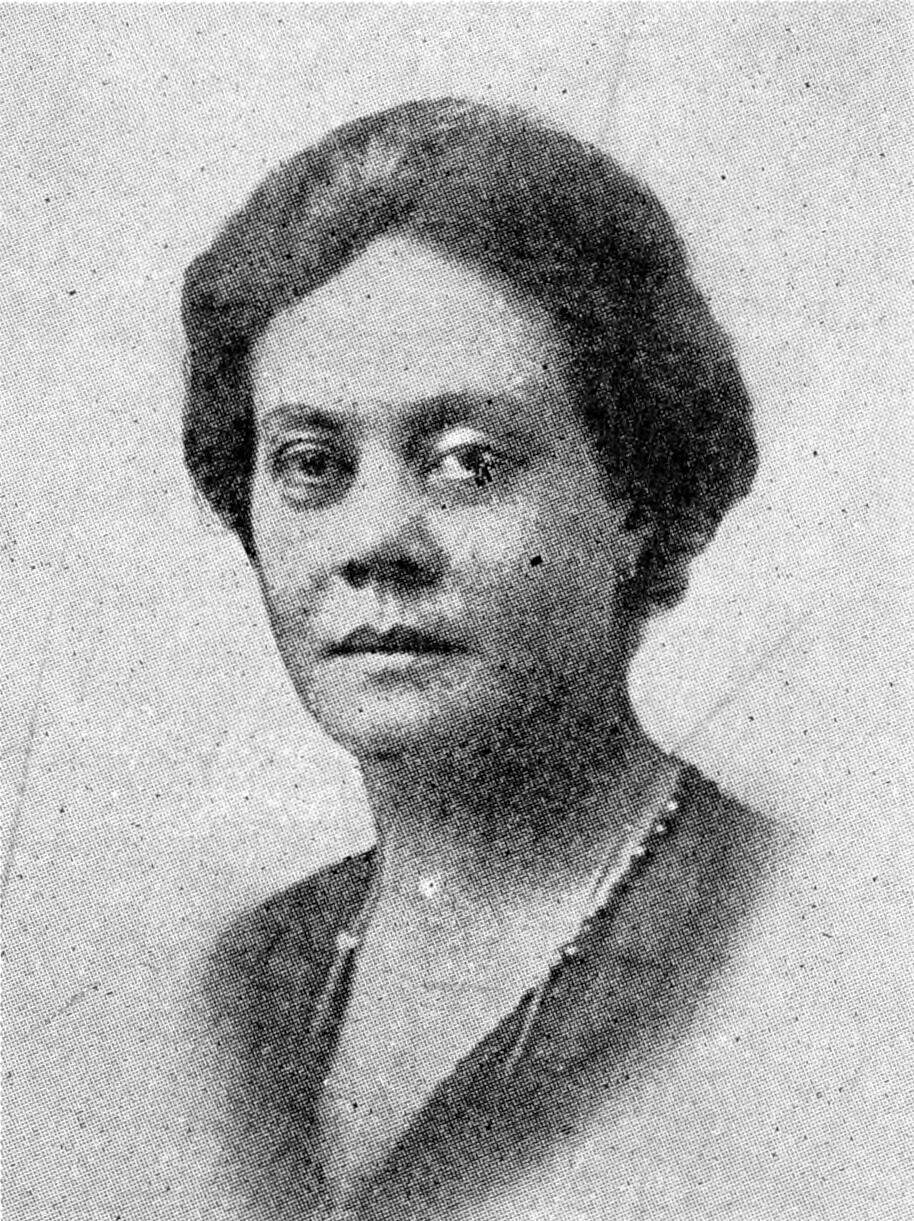
Alice Dunbar Nelson, before 1924

In essays such as "Negro Women in War Work" (1919), "Politics in Delaware" (1924), "Hysteria", and "Is It Time for Negro Colleges in the South to Be Put in the Hands of Negro Teachers?" Dunbar-Nelson explored the role of black women in the workforce, education, and the antilynching movement. The examples demonstrate a social activist role in her life. Dunbar-Nelson's writings express her belief of equality between the races and between men and women. She believed that African Americans should have equal access to education, jobs, healthcare, transportation and other constitutionally granted rights. Her activism and support for certain racial and feminist causes started to appear around the early 1900s, where she publicly discussed the women's suffrage movement in the middle American states. In 1918, she was a field representative for the Woman's Committee of the Council of Defense, only a few years after marrying Robert J. Nelson who was a poet and a social activist as well. She significantly contributed to some African American newspapers such as the Wilmington Advocate and The Dunbar Speaker and Entertainer.

Following her leading role in the Woman's Committee, Alice became the executive secretary of the American friends inter-racial peace committee, which was then a highlight of her activism life. She successfully created a career co-editing newspapers and essays that focused on the social issues that minorities and women were struggling through in American through the 1920s, and she was specifically influential due to her gain of an international supportive audience that she used to voice over her opinion. Much of Dunbar-Nelson's writing was about the color line – both white and black color lines. In an autobiographical piece, "Brass Ankles Speaks", she discusses the difficulties she faced growing up mixed-race in Louisiana. She recalls the isolation and the sensation of not belonging to or being accepted by either race. As a child, she said, she was called a "half white nigger" and while adults were not as vicious with their name-calling, they were also not accepting of her. Both black and white individuals rejected her for being "too white." White coworkers did not think she was racial enough, and black coworkers did not think she was dark enough to work with her own people. She wrote that being multiracial was hard because "the 'Brass Ankles' must bear the hatred of their own and the prejudice of the white race" ("Brass Ankles Speaks"). Much of Dunbar-Nelson's writing was rejected because she wrote about the color line, oppression, and themes of racism. Few mainstream publications would publish her writing because they did not believe it was marketable. She was able to publish her writing, however, when the themes of racism and oppression were more subtle.

== Legacy ==
In 2025, five of her poems were included in a double-album released by Chicago-based baritone Will Liverman, entitled “The Dunbar/Moore Sessions”.

== "I Sit and Sew" ==
"I Sit and Sew" by Alice Dunbar-Nelson is a three-stanza poem written 1918. In stanza one, the speaker addresses the endless task of sitting and sewing as opposed to engaging in activity that aids soldiers at war. In doing so, the speaker addresses issues of social norms and the expectation of women as domestic servants. As the poem continues into stanza two, the speaker continues to express the desire to venture beyond the confines of social exceptions by furthering the imagery of war as opposed to domestic duty, yet the speaker resolves the second stanza with the refrain of the first, "I must Sit and Sew". By doing so, the speaker amplifies the arresting realities of domestic duty attributed to womanhood in the 1900s. In the third and final stanza, the speaker further amplifies desire and passion by saying both the living and dead call for my help. The speaker ends by asking God, "must I sit and sew?" In doing so, the speaker appeals to heavenly intervention to further amplify the message within the poem.

== Works ==
- Violets and Other Tales, Boston: Monthly Review, 1895. Short stories and poems, including "Titée", "A Carnival Jangle", and "Little Miss Sophie". Digital Schomburg. ("The Woman" reprinted in Margaret Busby (ed.), Daughters of Africa, 1992, pp. 161–163.)
- The Goodness of St. Rocque and Other Stories, 1899, including "Titée" (revised), "Little Miss Sophie", and "A Carnival Jangle".
- "Wordsworth's Use of Milton's Description of the Building of Pandemonium", 1909, in Modern Language Notes.
- (As editor) Masterpieces of Negro Eloquence: The Best Speeches Delivered by the Negro from the days of Slavery to the Present Time, 1914.
- "People of Color in Louisiana", 1917, in Journal of Negro History.
- Mine Eyes Have Seen, 1918, one-act play, in The Crisis, journal of the National Association for the Advancement of Colored People (NAACP).
- (As editor) The Dunbar Speaker and Entertainer: Containing the Best Prose and Poetic Selections by and About the Negro Race, with Programs Arranged for Special Entertainments, 1920.
- "The Colored United States", 1924, The Messenger, literary and political magazine in NY
- "From a Woman's Point of View" ("Une Femme Dit"), 1926, column for the Pittsburgh Courier.
- "I Sit and I Sew", "Snow in October", and "Sonnet", in Countee Cullen (ed.), Caroling Dusk: An Anthology of Verse by Negro Poets, 1927.
- "As in a Looking Glass", 1926–1930, column for the Washington Eagle newspaper.
- "So It Seems to Alice Dunbar-Nelson", 1930, column for the Pittsburgh Courier.
- Various poems published in the NAACP's journal The Crisis, in Ebony and Topaz: A Collectanea (edited by Charles S. Johnson), and in Opportunity, the journal of the Urban League.
- Give Us Each Day: The Diary of Alice Dunbar-Nelson, ed. Gloria T. Hull, New York: Norton, 1984.
- Dunbar-Nelson, Alice Moore (1988). Hull, Gloria T. (ed.). The Works of Alice Dunbar-Nelson. The Schomburg library of nineteenth-century black women writers. Vol. 1. New York Oxford: Oxford University Press. ISBN 0-19-505250-1.
- Dunbar-Nelson, Alice Moore (1988). Hull, Gloria T. (ed.). The Works of Alice Dunbar-Nelson. The Schomburg library of nineteenth-century black women writers. Vol. 2. New York Oxford: Oxford University Press. ISBN 0-19-505251-X.
- Dunbar-Nelson, Alice Moore (1988). Hull, Gloria T. (ed.). The works of Alice Dunbar-Nelson. The Schomburg library of nineteenth-century Black women writers. Vol. 3. New York: Oxford University Press. ISBN 0-19-505252-8.
- "Writing, Citizenship, Alice Dunbar-Nelson". Zagarell, Sandra A. Legacy, Vol. 36, Iss. 2, (2019): 241–244.
- "I sit and sew" in Virginia's Sisters: An Anthology of Women's Writing, Aurora Metro Books, (2023), ISBN 9781912430789
