= School for Coquettes (1958 film) =

- Directed by: Jacqueline Audry
- Written by: Paul Armont; Pierre Laroche; Marcel Gerbidon
- Based on: School for Coquettes by Paul Armont and Marcel Gerbidon
- Produced by: Max Vinbert
- Starring: Dany Robin; Fernand Gravey; Bernard Blier
- Cinematography: Marcel Grignon
- Edited by: André Laurent
- Music by: Georges van Parys
- Production company: Productions Métropolitaines de Films
- Distributed by: Pathé Consortium Cinéma
- Release date: 21 May 1958 (France)
- Running time: 100 minutes
- Country: France
- Language: French

School for Coquettes (French: L'école des cocottes) is a 1958 French comedy film directed by Jacqueline Audry and starring Dany Robin, Fernand Gravey and Bernard Blier. It was based on the 1918 play School for Coquettes by Marcel Gerbidon and Paul Armont.

== Plot ==
A young Parisian woman attends a school for coquettes in order to rise in society.

== Main cast ==
- Dany Robin as Ginette Masson
- Fernand Gravey as Stanislas de La Ferronière
- Bernard Blier as Labaume
- Odette Laure as Amélie
- Darry Cowl as Gégène
- Suzanne Dehelly as Madame Bernoux
- Robert Vattier as Racinet
- Jean-Claude Brialy as Robert
