= Robert Hennion =

French film director (1898–1984)

- Born: Robert Alexandre Célestin Hennion; Colombes
- Died: 18 January 1984 (aged 85); Paris
- Occupation: Film director
- Years active: 1939–1951

Robert Hennion (17 February 1898 – 18 January 1984) was a French film director. He began his career as an assistant to Maurice de Canonge, and built a career directing primarily comedies.

== Assistant director ==
- 1939 : Thérèse Martin de Maurice de Canonge
- 1946 : Les Trois Tambours de Maurice de Canonge
- 1946 : Mission spéciale de Maurice de Canonge

== Director ==
- 1947: Ploum, ploum, tra-la-la or De porte en porte
- 1948: Et dix de der !
- 1948: Memories Are Not for Sale
- 1950: The Atomic Monsieur Placido
- 1951: L'Alsace d'hier et de demain (short film, black and white documentary)
