= Sarah Lee Brown Fleming =

American educator and activist (1876–1963)

- Born: January 10, 1876; Charleston, South Carolina, U.S.
- Died: January 5, 1963 (aged 86)
- Occupations: Educator; civil rights activist; playwright; poet; novelist
- Spouse: Richard Stedman Fleming (m. 1902)
- Children: 2

Sarah Lee Brown Fleming (January 10, 1876 – January 5, 1963) was an American educator, social and community activist, playwright, poet, novelist, and the first African-American teacher in the Brooklyn school system.

Her most notable published work is the novel Hope's Highway (1918) and Clouds and Sunshine (1920).

== Background ==
She was born on January 10, 1876, in Charleston, South Carolina, and was raised in Brooklyn, New York. Growing up, she had aspirations to become a schoolteacher but her father thought the only job viable for her was domestic work. Despite her parents’ sentiments, she went on to become the first black schoolteacher in the Brooklyn School system.

== Personal life ==
On November 5, 1902, she married Richard Stedman Fleming, who was also groundbreaking in his own right as the first African-American dentist in Connecticut. They had two children, Dorothy and Harold, born in 1903 and 1906 respectively.

== Civic work ==
Sarah Fleming had many accomplishments in her life. In her civic work, she organized the New Haven's Women’s Civic League (1929) and founded the Phillis Wheatley Home for Girls (1936), where she promoted and developed a small shelter for young black women who came to New Haven in search for work. In November of 1944, she along with Grace Dadd of West Haven, chartered the New Haven Club of the National Association of Negro Business and professional Woemen's Club's incorporated- the first club in New England. The club continues to operate today, serving the greater New Haven, CT community. She was cited before Congress in 1955 for her many community contributions, and that same year she also received the Sojourner Truth Scroll, an annual award sponsored by the National Association of Negro Business and Professional Women’s Club. She was also an associate of Mary McLeod Bethune who was a prominent influence in education. She was devoted to furthering the advancement of colored girls and women. She was also a suffragist.

== Artistic work ==
Sarah Fleming has been most recognized for her civic work rather than her art. The songs, skits, and musicals that she wrote have not been published. Her two known works of literature are Hope’s Highway and Clouds and Sunshine. Hope’s Highway is an antislavery novel that calls for integration and educational advancement. It suggests that educated African Americans must lead the race. Fleming addresses issues of religion, class, race, and gender. Clouds and Sunshine is a collection of poetry that sheds light on Fleming’s political views. The book is divided into three parts containing different types of poems: general poems, dialect poems, and race poems. Her writings demonstrate her determination and optimism of uplifting the African-American race.

== Death ==
She died at the age of 86 on January 5, 1963.
