= Mine Eyes Have Seen =

- Original title: The Crisis
- Written by: Alice Dunbar Nelson
- Characters: Dan; Chris; Lucy; Mrs. O’Neill; Jake; Julia; Bill Harvey; Cornelia Lewis
- Original language: English
- Subject: Jingoism, African American rights
- Genre: Drama
- Setting: 1918, a manufacturing city in the northern part of the United States

Premiere
- Date premiered: April 1918

Mine Eyes Have Seen is a play by Alice Dunbar Nelson. It was published in the April 1918 edition of the monthly news magazine of the National Association for the Advancement of Colored People (NAACP) entitled The Crisis. Nelson examined the idea that the black man's service to his country and his race required his life as a response to the Selective Service Act of 1917 as well as promoted the anti-lynching movement through the exploration of the broken black home during that time.

== Plot summary ==
Before the play begins, it has been established that the family had to flee their home in the south after their father was lynched due to the white neighbors growing tired of his success. Shortly after arriving, the three siblings Dan, Chris, and Lucy lose their mother to "pneumonia and heartbreak" after the death of their father. Dan is also crippled while working in a factory and Lucy lives in constant fear due to their transition.

The show opens with Dan and Lucy in the kitchen of their less than desirable apartment waiting to eat lunch due to the anticipated arrival of their brother from work. The siblings are dependent on their brother due to the circumstances of their father's death. Chris arrives home with the news that he has been drafted into the U.S. Army.

Chris struggles with the requirements being made of him as a U.S. citizen, when justice was blind to the murder of his father. Also he's concerned about the welfare of his siblings in his absence. The other characters try to persuade him to reconsider. Mrs. O'Neill, who was left a widow when her husband went off to war, informs Chris of the honor and valor of the sacrifice. Jake - a Jewish neighbor - interjects with his own wish for such things and proclaims that he deserves the honor. Lucy even succumbs to the great idea and urges Chris to accept for the purpose of making a good name for their race.

Ultimately Chris decides to follow the promise of the patriotic sacrifice to ones country and becomes a soldier. His family cheers, and "The Battle Hymn of the Republic" is heard intensifying in volume as the curtain closes.

== Characters ==
- Dan, the cripple
- Chris, the younger brother
- Lucy, the sister
- Mrs. O'Neil, an Irish neighbor
- Jake, a Jewish boy
- Julia, Chris's sweetheart
- Bill Harvey, a muleteer
- Cornelia Lewis, a settlement worker

== Critical approaches ==
=== Written for a white audience ===
Critics argue that Nelsons examination of the black family's struggle is overshadowed by her consistency of overpowering her black characters with white ones. Gloria Hull claims Nelson wrote narratives that were "racially white" as well as presented her own personal experiences through the lens of white protagonists.

== Themes ==
=== Patriotism ===
"out of this war will rise ... an American Negro, with the right to vote and the right to work and the right to live without insult" - W. E Du Bois

With the passing of the 14th Amendment, citizenship was granted to black residents of the United States bringing about an eagerness to prove their earned connection to the country. Once the County emerged into WWI, black men were faced with the difficult choice of whether to serve the country that had failed to protect the rights of its own citizens. Nelson's Drama presented the image of the intellectual black man in order to disregard the racist proclamations of their unwanted place in the fight against Germany. The presentation of this idea through Drama also contributed a method in which to establish the black community as a cultured society.

=== Anti-lynching ===
The effects of Chris, Dan, and Lucy's father being lynched before the play begins establishes the exploration of the effects of lynching on the domestic lives of black families during that time in order to promote anti-lynching throughout the play. The deterioration of each of the characters after their forced transition due to the murder of their father directly connects to this idea. Nelson might not examine actual lynchings in Mine Eyes Have Seen, but the effects of such acts are present after the characters must travel north: Their mother passes due to the abysmal atmosphere of the north, Dan is crippled while working in a factory, and Lucy lives with a limp and constant fear.

== Inspirations ==
=== The Battle Hymn of the Republic ===
"Abolitionist marching song references African American participation in previous wars, as it was originally used to recruit black soldiers in the Civil War" - Bethany Wood

The hymn itself was utilized not only as a tool to establish Chris's decision to join the military, but also a way to connect the Military service to the nation's Christian practices. Nelson used the hymn as a paradigm to connect the African American identity to the nations upheld values such in order to eliminate the separation between the black man and his country It also provides a direct connection to the fact that black men have fought for their country before, as Dan points out: "Our men have always gone [to fight], the struggles of 1861 And they were there in 1898."

=== Character ===
"Though mostly poor, the characters are decent, respectable, and above-all well-spoken" - Gloria Hull

Nelson's presentation of African American characters without dialects was revolutionary for the time and was a direct fight against the common portrayals of the race during that time. The 'Negro Dialect' was common among the theater of the time and was the widely known representation of the black character's voice in performance and text The apparent intellect of the black characters through their well-spoken nature further promotes her idea of establishing the black man as an educated, valued, and competent American citizen.

== Production history ==
=== Howard High School ===
The first performance of the piece was done in Wilmington, Delaware at Howard High School where for eighteen years Nelson was head of English.

Ghostlight Ensemble produced the play in 2021 as part of their (Re)Consideration series. The play was directed by Angelisa Gillyard. http://www.ghostlightensemble.com/mine-eyes-have-seen
