= Cora Goffin =

British actress

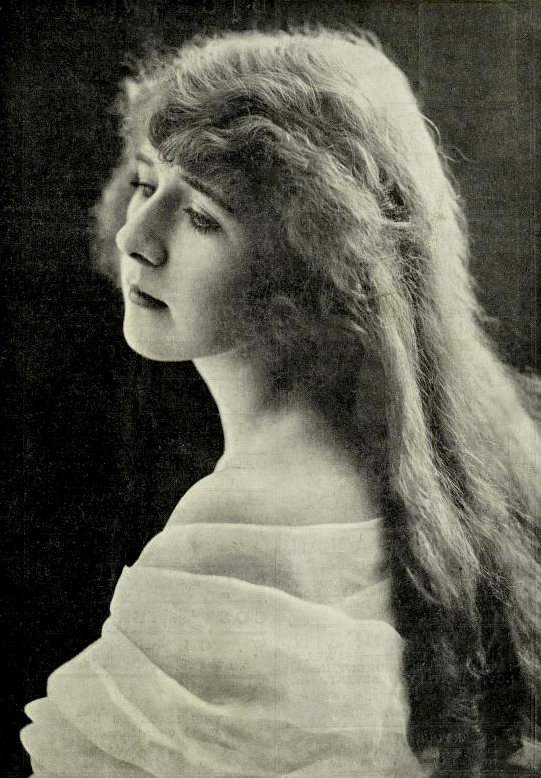
- Cora Goffin, from a 1921 publication.
- Born: Cora Gwynne Poole Goffin; 26 April 1902; Hampstead
- Died: 10 June 2004 (aged 102); Lewes
- Other names: Cora Littler, Lady Littler
- Occupation: Actress

Cora Goffin (26 April 1902 – 10 June 2004) later known as Lady Littler, was a British actress on the London stage, in pantomime, and in two silent films.

== Early life ==
Cora Gwynne Poole Goffin was born in Hampstead in 1902, the daughter and namesake of actress Cora Poole. She was on stage from childhood, with her mother's instruction and encouragement.

== Career ==
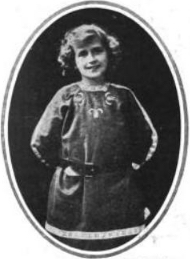
Cora Goffin as Alice in 'Alice in Wonderland', from a 1914 publication.

Cora Goffin was an actress on the London stage from her teens, where she often played children, including boys. She played Little Lord Fauntleroy, Colin in Mother Goose, a principal boy in Jack and the Beanstalk, and Alice in Alice in Wonderland (1913), sometimes billed as "Little Cora Goffin." "Cora cannot have been more than twelve years old, but she spoke the lines of her long part with the assurance of an old hand, danced on her toes like a little prima ballerina, and took her encores with the enviable enjoyment of unspoilt childhood," commented a reviewer in The Guardian. She toured with the Juvenile Shakespeare Company, and starred in a touring production of Sweet Lavender.

During World War I, she performed at a benefit show for the Soldiers' and Sailors' Dental Aid Fund. In 1923, she was the female lead in The Talk of the Town. In 1926, she played the lead in No, No, Nanette after Binnie Hale left the role. There were reports that she had her legs insured for £20,000 with Lloyd's of London. She performed in pantomime shows produced by her husband in the 1930s, especially Aladdin. She retired from the stage in 1940.

Goffin appeared in two silent films produced by the Lambart Film Company: Romance and Reality (1921) and Down Under Donovan (1922). She sang on radio programs in the 1930s.

== Personal life ==
Goffin married theatre manager Emile Littler in 1933; there was a Pathé News interview with them on their wedding day, which was a Friday the 13th. The couple adopted two daughters in the 1950s. She became Lady Littler when Emile was knighted in 1974. Sir Emile Littler died in 1985 and Cora died in 2004, aged 102 years, in Lewes, Sussex.
