= The Man Who Knew (novel) =

1918 novel by Edgar Wallace

- Author: Edgar Wallace
- Language: English
- Genre: Thriller
- Publication date: 1918
- Publication place: United Kingdom
- Media type: Print

The Man Who Knew is a 1918 British thriller novel by Edgar Wallace. A detective investigates the death of a South Africa diamond magnate in London.

== Adaptation ==
In 1961 it was turned into the film Partners in Crime, directed by Peter Duffell as part of a long-running series of Wallace films made at Merton Park Studios.

== Bibliography ==
- Goble, Alan. The Complete Index to Literary Sources in Film. Walter de Gruyter, 1999.
