= School for Coquettes (1935 film) =

1935 film directed by Pierre Colombier

- Directed by: Pierre Colombier
- Based on: School for Coquettes by Marcel Gerbidon and Paul Armont
- Starring: Raimu; André Lefaur; Renée Saint-Cyr
- Cinematography: Michel Kelber
- Production company: Pathé-Nathan
- Distributed by: Pathé Distribution
- Release date: 27 September 1935
- Running time: 105 minutes
- Country: France
- Language: French

School for Coquettes (French: L'école des cocottes) is a 1935 French comedy film directed by Pierre Colombier and starring Raimu, André Lefaur and Renée Saint-Cyr. It is based on the 1918 play School for Coquettes by Marcel Gerbidon and Paul Armont. It was shot at the Joinville The film's sets were designed by the art director Jacques Colombier. Future star Ginette Leclerc had a small supporting role.

== Synopsis ==
In Edwardian Paris, a young working-class girl attends an academy which teaches her the arts of a coquette to enable her to rise in society.

== Cast ==
- Raimu as Labaume
- André Lefaur as Stanislas de la Ferronnière
- Renée Saint-Cyr as Ginette
- Henry Roussel as Racinet
- Jean Marconi as Robert
- Pauline Carton as Mme Bernoux
- Madeleine Suffel as Amélie
- Andrée Doria
- Ginette Leclerc
- Auguste Mouriès
- Georges Tréville

== Bibliography ==
- Dayna Oscherwitz & MaryEllen Higgins. The A to Z of French Cinema. Scarecrow Press, 2009.
