= Those Folk of Bulboro =

1918 novel by Edgar Wallace

- Author: Edgar Wallace
- Language: English
- Genre: Drama
- Publisher: Ward Lock
- Publication date: June 1918
- Publication place: United Kingdom
- Media type: Print

Those Folk of Bulboro is a 1918 novel by the British writer Edgar Wallace. It is likely it was written before the First World War, possibly even as early as 1908, and that Wallace produced the old manuscript to fulfil his contract with his publishers Ward Lock.

Unlike the vast majority of Wallace's work it is neither a thriller of a mystery novel, but a drama about intolerance in a northern town. The hero is a doctor who returns from the Belgian Congo to take over his uncle's medical practice.

== Bibliography ==
- Clark, Neil. Stranger than Fiction: The Life of Edgar Wallace, the Man Who Created King Kong. The History Press, 2015.
