= The Glad Eye (1920 film) =

1920 film

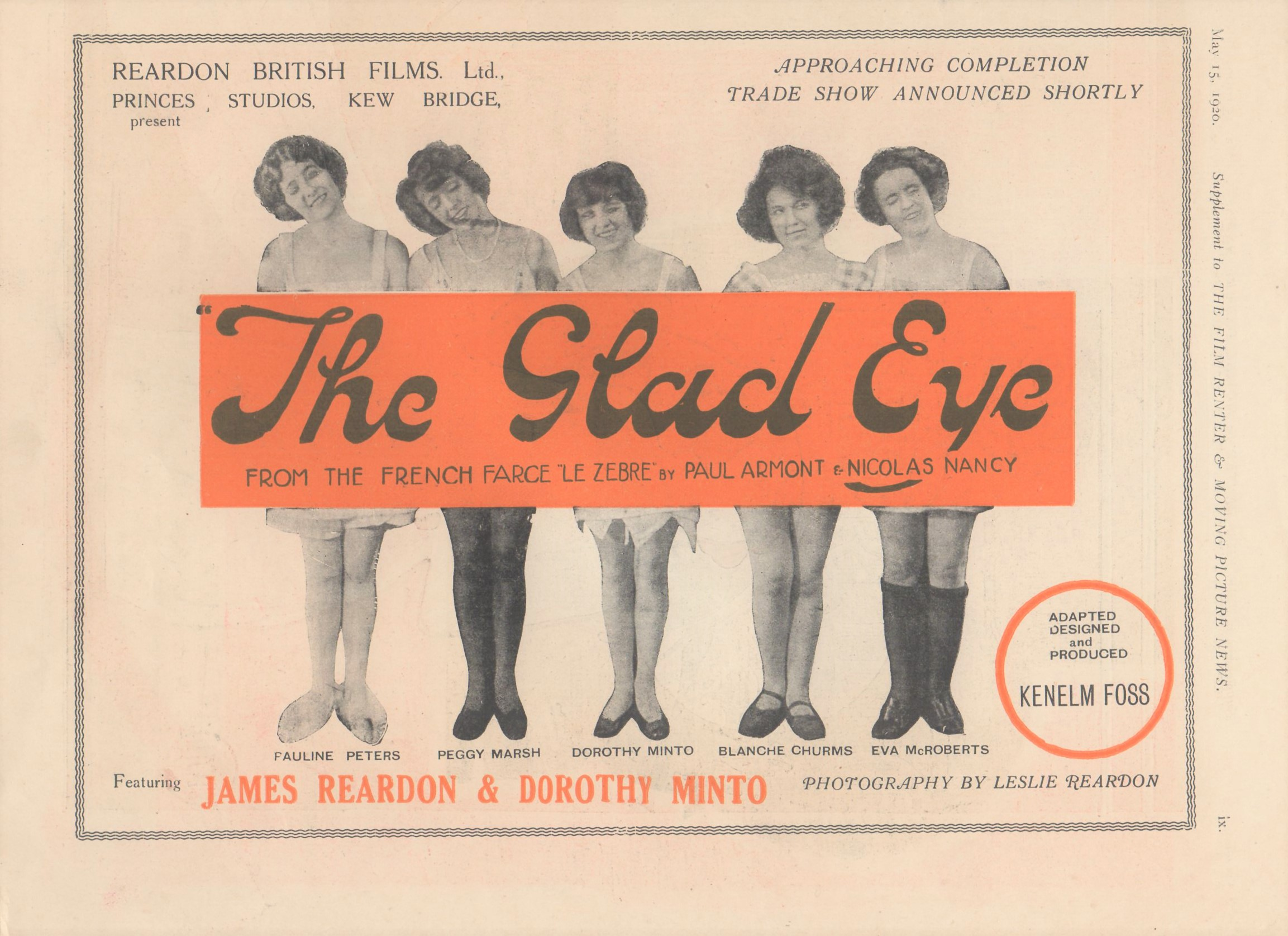
- Directed by: James Reardon; Kenelm Foss
- Written by: Paul Armont (play); Nicolas Nancey (play); Kenelm Foss
- Produced by: James Reardon
- Starring: James Reardon; Dorothy Minto; Hayford Hobbs
- Production company: Stoll Pictures
- Distributed by: Stoll Pictures
- Release date: 1920
- Country: United Kingdom
- Language: English

The Glad Eye is a 1920 British silent comedy film directed by James Reardon and Kenelm Foss and starring James Reardon, Dorothy Minto and Hayford Hobbs. It is an adaptation of the play Le Zebre by Paul Armont and Nicolas Nancey. It was remade as a film of the same name in 1927.

== Cast ==
- James Reardon as James Reardon
- Dorothy Minto as Kiki
- Hayford Hobbs as Maurice Polignac
- Pauline Peters as Lucienne Bocard
- Peggy Marsh as Suzanne Polignac
- Will Corrie as Gallipot
- Lyell Johnstone as Tricassin
- Billy Armstrong as Sox
- Blanche Churms as Juliette
- Douglas Munro as Gendarme
- Joe Peterman as Manager
- George Bellamy as Spiritualist
