= School for Coquettes (play) =

School for Coquettes (French: L'école des cocottes) is 1918 French comedy play by Paul Armont and Marcel Gerbidon. A young working-class woman attends a school to turn her into a coquette in the hope it will allow her to rise up the social scale. It was first performed at the Grand Guignol Theatre in Paris.

A 1928 British play Excelsior was based on the play, written by H. M. Harwood and starring Gladys Cooper.

== Adaptations ==
The film has been turned into films twice. A 1935 film School for Coquettes directed by Pierre Colombier and a 1958 film School for Coquettes directed by Jacqueline Audry. It was also made into a 1985 television play.
