= Paul Armont =

French playwright and screenwriter

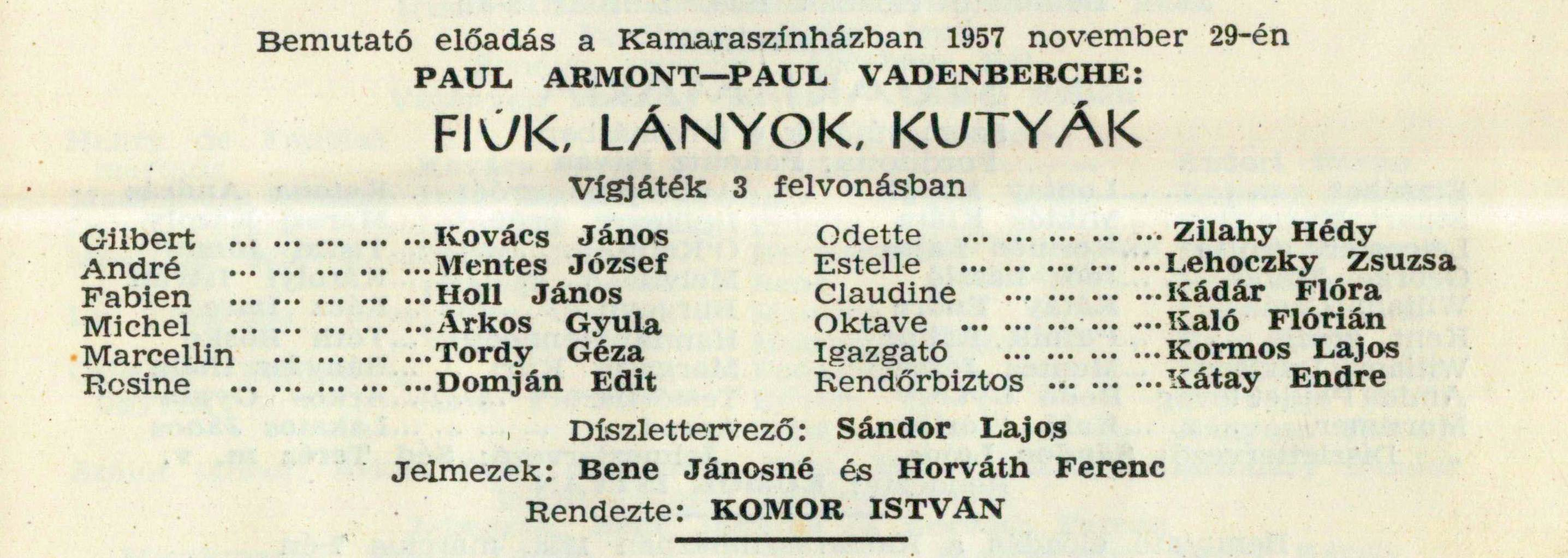
Cast of the premiere of the play Fiúk, lányok, kutyák (Face to the Wind/No More Vacation for the Good Lord) by Paul Armont & Paul Vandenberghe, November 29, 1957 in the chamber theatre of the National Theatre of Szeged, Hungary

Paul Armont (1874–1943) was a Russian-born French playwright and screenwriter. He also collaborated with the Swiss writer Marcel Gerbidon. He was born Dimitri Petrococchino in Rostov in the Russian Empire.

== Selected plays ==
- 1913 – Le Chevalier au masque, co-written by Jean Manoussi
- 1920 – La Maison du passeur, episode of World War I, co-written by Louis Verneuil
- 1934 – Le Coup du parapluie
- 1939 – Garçons, filles et chiens (Face to the Wind), co-written by Paul Vandenberghe

=== In collaboration with Nicolas Nancey ===
- 1905 – Le Truc du Brésilien
- 1906 – Le Trèfle à quatre
- 1909 – Théodore et Cie
- 1920 – Le Zèbre

=== In collaboration with Marcel Gerbidon ===
- 1914 – La Tontine
- 1916 – Le Coq en pâte
- 1916 – Le Mari garçon
- 1918 – School for Coquettes, Théâtre du Grand-Guignol
- 1923 – Dicky, co-written with Jean Manoussi
- 1924 – Un chien qui rapporte
- 1925 – Alain, sa mère et sa maîtresse
- 1925 – Jeunes filles de palaces
- 1927 – Le Club des loufoques
- 1927 – L'Enlèvement, Théâtre de la Michodière, 6 September
- 1928 – Souris d'hôtel
- 1929 – L'Enlèvement
- 1929 – L'Amoureuse Aventure
- 1930 – Coiffeur pour dames
- 1930 – Fleurs de luxe, Théâtre Daunou
- 1933 – Un soir de réveillon (operetta), lyrics Jean Boyer, music Raoul Moretti

=== In collaboration with Jacques Bousquet ===
- 1921 – Comédienne
- 1925 – Le Danseur de Madame

=== In collaboration with Léopold Marchand ===
- 1923 – La Femme du jour, Théâtre de la Potinière
- 1924 – Le Tailleur au château
- 1931 – Ces messieurs de la Santé
- 1938 – Le Valet maître, Théâtre de la Michodière

== Filmography ==
- La trovata del brasiliano, directed by Filippo Castamagna (Italy, 1916, based on the play Le Truc du Brésilien)
- The Glad Eye, directed by Kenelm Foss and James Reardon (UK, 1920, based on the play Le Zèbre)
- The Hotel Mouse, directed by Fred Paul (UK, 1923, based on the play Souris d'hôtel)
- The French Doll, directed by Robert Z. Leonard (1923, based on the play Jeunes filles de palaces)
- The Goldfish, directed by Jerome Storm (1924, based on the play School for Coquettes)
- Teodoro e socio, directed by Mario Bonnard (Italy, 1925, based on the play Théodore et Cie)
- Dancing Mad, directed by Alexander Korda (Germany, 1925, based on the play Le Danseur de Madame)
- Fashions for Women, directed by Dorothy Arzner (1927, based on the play La Femme du jour)
- The Glad Eye, directed by Maurice Elvey (UK, 1927, based on the play Le Zèbre)
- Souris d'hôtel, directed by Adelqui Migliar (France, 1929, based on the play Souris d'hôtel)
- Madame Makes Her Exit, directed by Wilhelm Thiele (German, 1931, based on the play L'Amoureuse Aventure)
  - Amourous Adventure, directed by Wilhelm Thiele (French, 1932, based on the play L'Amoureuse Aventure)
- A Dog That Pays Off, directed by Jean Choux (France, 1932, based on the play Un chien qui rapporte)
- Coiffeur pour dames, directed by René Guissart (France, 1932, based on the play Coiffeur pour dames)
- Love Me Tonight, directed by Rouben Mamoulian (1932, based on the play Le Tailleur au château)
- Le Truc du Brésilien, directed by Alberto Cavalcanti (France, 1932, based on the play Le Truc du Brésilien)
- Theodore and Company, directed by Pierre Colombier (France, 1933, based on the play Théodore et Cie)
- Le Mari garçon, directed by Alberto Cavalcanti (France, 1933, based on the play Le Mari garçon)
- Un soir de réveillon, directed by Karl Anton (France, 1933, based on the operetta Un soir de réveillon)
- Ces messieurs de la Santé, directed by Pierre Colombier (France, 1934, based on the play Ces messieurs de la Santé)
- Le Coup de parapluie, directed by Pierre-Jean Ducis and Victor de Fast (France, 1934, short film based on the play Le Coup du parapluie)
- School for Coquettes, directed by Pierre Colombier (France, 1935, based on the play School for Coquettes)
- Die Entführung, directed by Géza von Bolváry (Germany, 1936, based on the play L'Enlèvement)
- The Mysterious Mister X, directed by J. A. Hübler-Kahla (Germany, 1936, based on the play Dicky)
- Monsieur Breloque a disparu, directed by Robert Péguy (France, 1938, based on the play Dicky)
- Un mare di guai, directed by Carlo Ludovico Bragaglia (Italy, 1939, based on the play Théodore et Cie)
- Trappola d'amore, directed by Raffaello Matarazzo (Italy, 1940, based on the play Dicky)
- Le Valet maître, directed by Paul Mesnier (France, 1941, based on the play Le Valet maître)
- Plus de vacances pour le Bon Dieu, directed by Robert Vernay (France, 1950, based on the play Garçons, filles et chiens)
- Un amour de parapluie, directed by Jean Laviron (France, 1951, short film based on the play Le Coup du parapluie)
- An Artist with Ladies, directed by Jean Boyer (France, 1952, based on the play Coiffeur pour dames)
- The Purple Mask, directed by H. Bruce Humberstone (1955, based on the play Le Chevalier au masque)
- School for Coquettes, directed by Jacqueline Audry (France, 1958, based on the play School for Coquettes)
