= James Reardon =

British actor(1885–?)

- Born: 1885; England, United Kingdom
- Occupations: Actor, Director
- Years active: 1916–1932 (film)

James Reardon (1885–?) was a British stage and film actor of the silent era. He also directed several films including The Glad Eye (1920).

== Selected filmography ==
=== Director ===
- To Let (1919) a British silent ghost movie
- The Glad Eye (1920)
- The Shadow of Evil (1921)

=== Actor ===
- A Rogue in Love (1916)
- A Romany Lass (1918)
- Rogues of the Turf (1923)
- Little Miss Nobody (1923)
- The School for Scandal (1923)
- The Feather (1929)
- Naughty Husbands (1930)

== Bibliography ==
- Low, Rachael. History of the British Film, 1914-1918. Routledge, 2005.
