= Marcel Gerbidon =

French playwright and screenwriter

Marcel Gerbidon (1868–1933) was a French playwright and screenwriter. He collaborated frequently with Paul Armont. A number of his plays have been adapted into films such as the 1958 film School for Coquettes.

== Selected plays ==
- School for Coquettes (1918)

== Filmography ==
- Le Porion, directed by Georges Champavert (France, 1921, based on the play Le Porion)
- The Hotel Mouse, directed by Fred Paul (UK, 1923, based on the play Souris d'hôtel)
- The French Doll, directed by Robert Z. Leonard (1923, based on the play Jeunes filles de palaces)
- The Goldfish, directed by Jerome Storm (1924, based on the play School for Coquettes)
- A Son from America, directed by Henri Fescourt (France, 1925, based on the play Un fils d'Amérique)
- Souris d'hôtel, directed by Adelqui Migliar (France, 1929, based on the play Souris d'hôtel)
- Madame Makes Her Exit, directed by Wilhelm Thiele (German, 1931, based on the play L'Amoureuse Aventure)
  - Amourous Adventure, directed by Wilhelm Thiele (French, 1932, based on the play L'Amoureuse Aventure)
- A Dog That Pays Off, directed by Jean Choux (France, 1932, based on the play Un chien qui rapporte)
- A Son from America, directed by Carmine Gallone (France, 1932, based on the play Un fils d'Amérique)
- Coiffeur pour dames, directed by René Guissart (France, 1932, based on the play Coiffeur pour dames)
- Le Mari garçon, directed by Alberto Cavalcanti (France, 1933, based on the play Le Mari garçon)
- Un soir de réveillon, directed by Karl Anton (France, 1933, based on the operetta Un soir de réveillon)
- School for Coquettes, directed by Pierre Colombier (France, 1935, based on the play School for Coquettes)
- Die Entführung, directed by Géza von Bolváry (Germany, 1936, based on the play L'Enlèvement)
- The Mysterious Mister X, directed by J. A. Hübler-Kahla (Germany, 1936, based on the play Dicky)
- Monsieur Breloque a disparu, directed by Robert Péguy (France, 1938, based on the play Dicky)
- Trappola d'amore, directed by Raffaello Matarazzo (Italy, 1940, based on the play Dicky)
- An Artist with Ladies, directed by Jean Boyer (France, 1952, based on the play Coiffeur pour dames)
- School for Coquettes, directed by Jacqueline Audry (France, 1958, based on the play School for Coquettes)

== Bibliography ==
- Pallister, Janis L. & Hottell, Ruth A. Francophone Women Film Directors: A Guide. Associated University Presses, 2005.
