= Mary Marquet =

Russian-French actress (1895–1979)

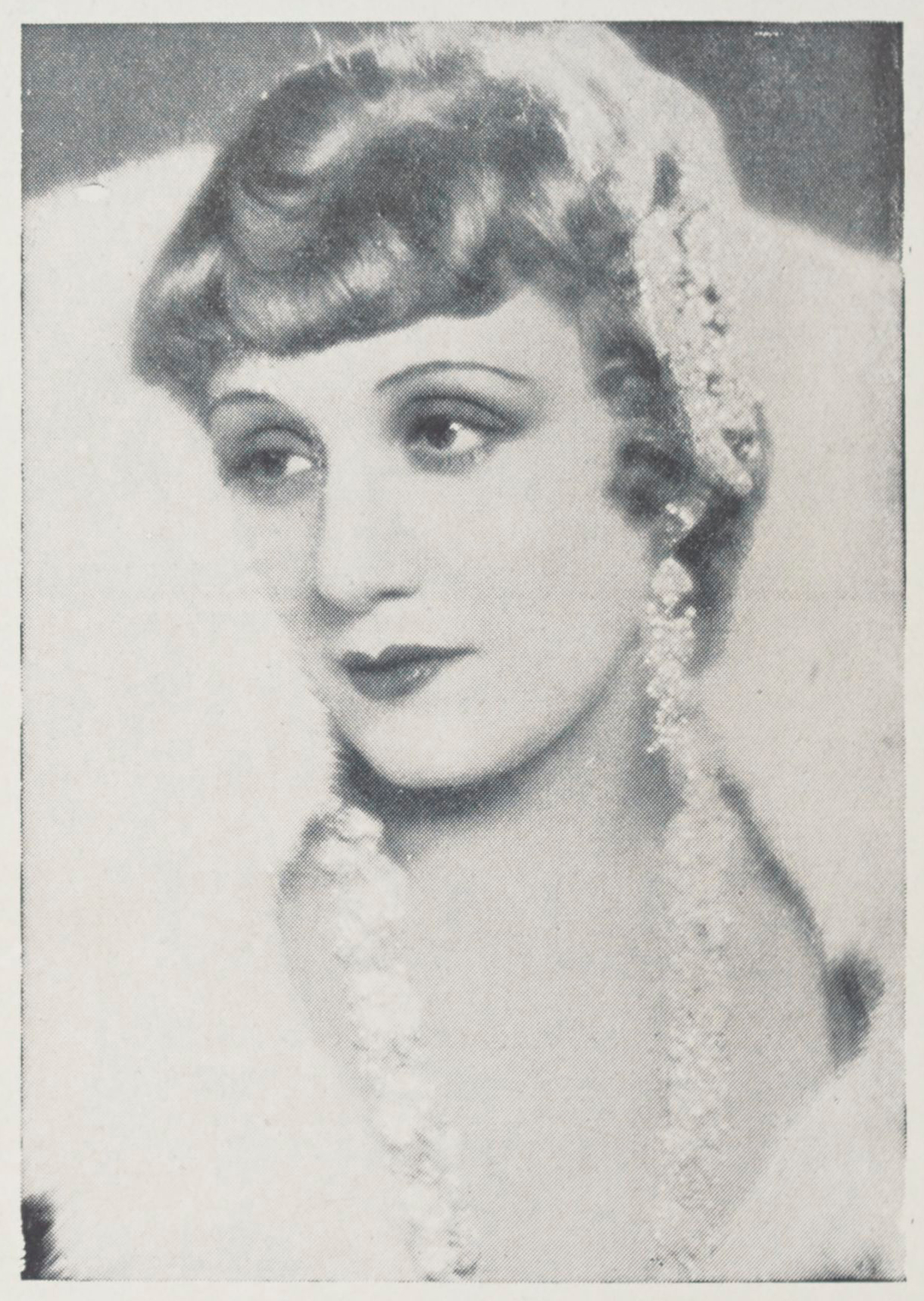
- Born: Micheline Marguerite Delphine Marquet; 14 April 1895; Saint Petersburg, Russian Empire
- Died: 29 August 1979 (aged 84); Paris, France
- Occupation: Actress
- Spouse: Victor Francen

Mary Marquet (born Micheline Marguerite Delphine Marquet; 14 April 1895 – 29 August 1979) was a Russian-French stage and film actress.

== Career ==
Marquet came from a family of artists: her parents were actors, an aunt was a star dancer at the Paris Opera, and another was an official at the Comédie-Française. She entered the National Superior Conservatory of Dramatic Art in 1913 and studied under Paul Mounet. She failed her final exams, but was immediately engaged in the company of Sarah Bernhardt, who was a great friend of the family. She went on play alongside her in The anti-war play by Eugene Morand, Les Cathédrales.

She became established with her role in L'Aiglon by Edmond Rostand, whose mistress she became from 1915 to his death in 1918. She made her film debut in 1914 in a silent film, Les Frères ennemis, which was never finished. She appeared in Sarah Bernhardt's last film, La Voyante in 1923, which was filmed in the great actress's home in Paris; unfortunately Sarah died during the production and it was released with another actor playing her in long shots. Marquet's first major film role was in Sappho, produced by Léonce Perret in 1932. After World War I, she joined the Comédie-Française in 1923 where she stayed for over twenty years, before moving to the boulevard Theatre.

In 1928 she became the face of a lipstick launched by Offenthal, claiming that "The Offenthal lipstick embellishes your kiss".

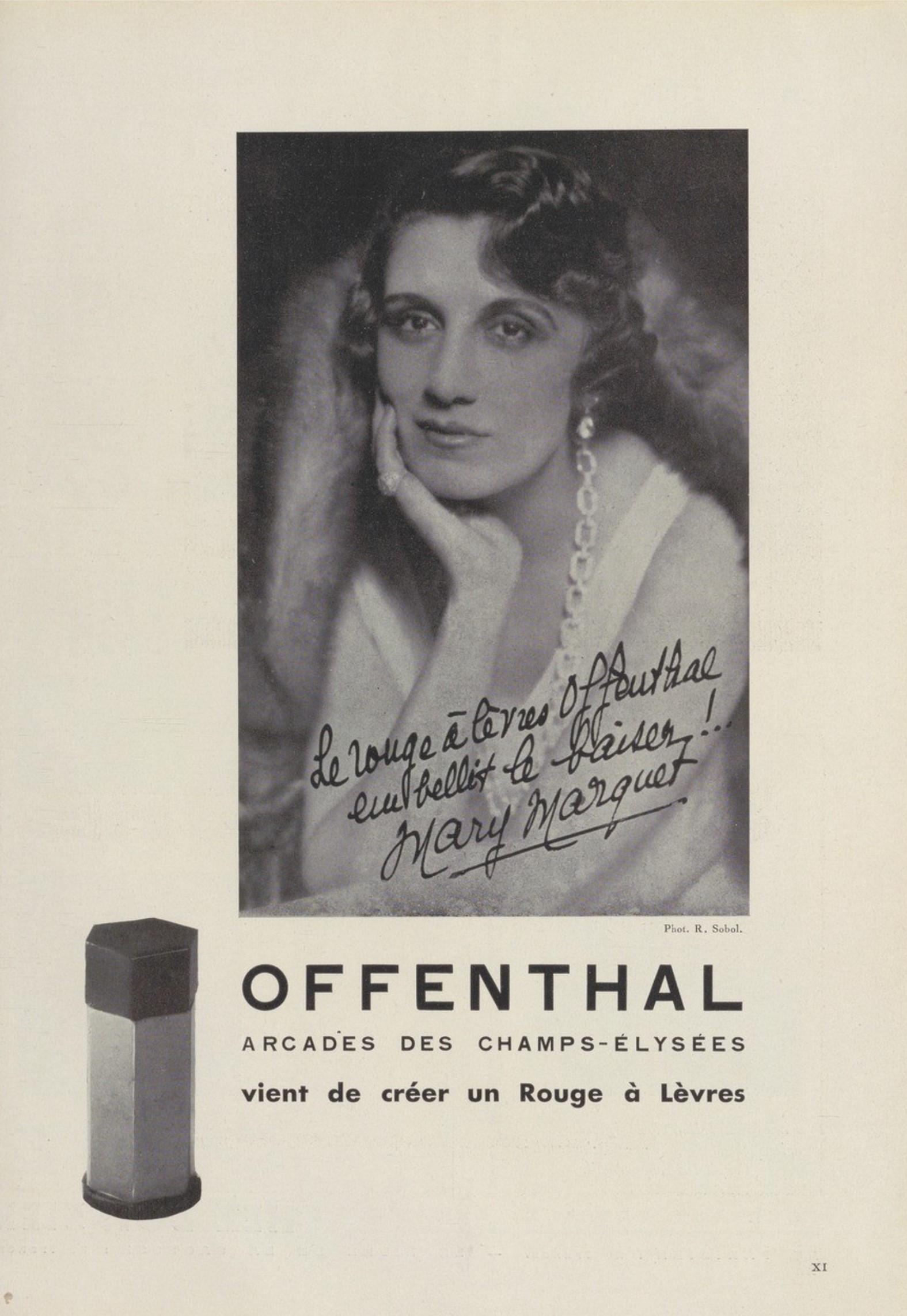
Mary Marquet promotes a lipstick by Offenthal - 1928

During the World War II, throughout the occupation, she sought the protection of German officers to protect her son who had told her of his intention to join the Resistance. The response was his arrest and deportation to Buchenwald concentration camp where he died aged 21. This was possibly the cause of her problems at the time of the Liberation when, due to her alleged relations with the enemy, Marquet was arrested and sent to Drancy and then to Fresnes. She was later released for lack of evidence.

In the 1950s, she turned to poetry recital, while continuing her career in theater on the boulevards. She worked for ORTF in the Maigret episodes of Les Cinq Dernières Minutes and Les Saintes Chéries and in the television adaptation of Lucien Leuwen, the novel by Stendhal.

Parallel to her acting career, as an antiquarian she ran a stand for many years at the Swiss Village, an important antique market in Paris where she demonstrated her skills as a saleswoman, mixing theatrical memorabilia with commercial interests.

Among her most successful parts in over forty films, were her roles in, Landru in 1962, Claude Chabrol, La Grande Vadrouille in 1966 by Gérard Oury, and Casanova in 1975 by Federico Fellini. After these three minor parts she played important roles in La vie de château (1966) the mother of Philippe Noiret and the stepmother of Catherine Deneuve and the Le malin plaisir (1975) with Claude Jade and Anny Duperey.

== Personal life ==
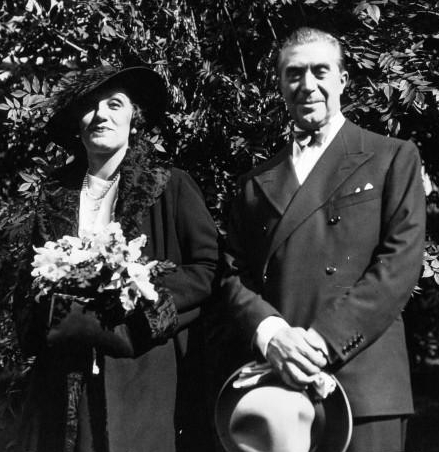
Mary Marquet and Victor Francen on their wedding day in 1934.

Her first lover was Edmond Rostand around 1915, living together for three years. In 1920 she married Maurice Escande, the future director of the house of Molière, ending in divorce in 1921, before meeting Firmin Gémier, the director of the new Théâtre National Populaire, who was still married but whose wife was barren. In 1922, Marquet gave birth to their son.

Before the death of Gémier in 1933, Marquet became the mistress of the president of the then Council, André Tardieu, in a semi-official liaison. Having broken up with Tardieu, she married Victor Francen. The couple separated after seven years together. Marquet died of heart attack at the age of 84 in her apartment in the Rue Carpeaux, She is buried in Montmartre Cemetery.

== Filmography ==
=== Cinema ===
- 1913: Les Frères ennemis (Short, by Henri Pouctal)
- 1913: De Medeminaars (by Alfred Machin, unsure))
- 1915: Sacrifice fraternel (Short, by René Leprince)
- 1917: La P'tite du sixième (by René Hervil et Louis Mercanton)
- 1921: La Ferme du Choquart (by Jean Kemm) - L'intrigante Aleth Guépie
- 1924: La Voyante (The Clairvoyant) (by Leon Abrams) - Madame Detaille
- 1934: Sapho (by Léonce Perret) - Fanny Legrand
- 1934: Un soir à la Comédie-Française (Short, by Léonce Perret)
- 1949: Forbidden to the Public (by Alfred Pasquali) - Gabrielle Tristan
- 1950: Le 84 prend des vacances (by Léo Joannon) - Madame de la Chambrière
- 1952: Un jour avec vous (by Jean-René Legrand) - Estelle de Marsans
- 1952: Foyer perdu (by Jean Loubignac) - Madame Barbentin mère
- 1952: Drôle de noce (by Léo Joannon) - Madame Aglaé
- 1952: Piédalu Works Miracles (by Jean Loubignac)
- 1953: Open Letter (by Alex Joffé) - Laurence - La belle-mère
- 1953: Minuit quai de Bercy (by Christian Stengel) - La grand-mère
- 1954: Royal Affairs in Versailles (by Sacha Guitry) - Madame de Maintenon
- 1955: Men in White (by Ralph Habib) - Mme. Ledragon
- 1956: Maid in Paris (by Pierre Gaspard-Huit) - Mme. Bernemal
- 1956: Le Secret de sœur Angèle (by Léo Joannon) - La supérieure de Marseille
- 1956: Law of the Streets (by Ralph Habib) - Madame Blain
- 1957: Quelle sacrée soirée / Nuit blanche et rouge à lèvres (by Robert Vernay) - La colonelle Dupont
- 1959: Drôle de phénomènes (by Robert Vernay) - La grand-mère volante
- 1960: The Nabob Affair (by Ralph Habib) - L'hôtelière
- 1962: Arsène Lupin Versus Arsène Lupin (by Édouard Molinaro) - la reine-mère Elisabeth de Moldavie / Queen Mother
- 1962: Nous irons à Deauville (by Francis Rigaud) - La propriétaire - Gertrude Couffinous
- 1963: Landru (by Claude Chabrol) - Madame Guillin
- 1966: A Matter of Resistance (by Jean-Paul Rappeneau) - Charlotte
- 1966: Les Combinards (by Jean-Claude Roy) - Mme Florenne, la marieuse
- 1966: The Gardener of Argenteuil (by Jean-Paul Le Chanois) - Dora
- 1966: La Grande Vadrouille (by Gérard Oury) - Mère Supérieure
- 1967: Des garçons et des filles (by Étienne Périer) - Tante Berthe
- 1967: Ce sacré grand-père (by Jacques Poitrenaud) - La Duchesse
- 1968: Phèdre (by Pierre Jourdan) - Oenone
- 1969: Bruno, l'enfant du dimanche (by Louis Grospierre) - Le mère de Michel
- 1974: Le Mouton enragé (by Michel Deville)
- 1974: La Bonne Nouvelle (Short, by André Weinfeld) - La tante / The Aunt
- 1974: Par ici la monnaie (by Richard Balducci) - La propriètaire
- 1974: Le polygame (by Maurice Jacquin Jr.) - La concierge
- 1974: La Merveilleuse Visite (by Marcel Carné) - La duchesse
- 1975: Malicious Pleasure (by Bernard Toublanc-Michel) - Madame Malaiseau
- 1976: Opération Lady Marlène (by Robert Lamoureux) - La centenaire
- 1976: Fellini's Casanova (by Federico Fellini) - Casanova's mother (uncredited)
- 1977: Une fille cousue de fil blanc (by Michel Lang) - La grand-mère (final film role)

=== Television ===
- 1968: Les Saintes Chéries (episode Ève et les grands-parents (Daniel Gélin's mother and Henri Crémieux's wife)) - La mère de Pierre
- 1969: Les Cinq Dernières Minutes (by Claude Loursais, episode Traitement de choc) - Mémée Trévières
- 1972: Les Enquêtes du commissaire Maigret (by François Villiers, episode: Maigret se fâche) - Mme Bernadette Armorelle
- 1973-1974: Lucien Leuwen (mini-serie) (by Claude Autant-Lara, TV Movie) - Mme de Marcilly
- 1974: Paul et Virginie (TV series) (by Pierre Gaspard-Huit) - Tante Vauté (1974)

== Theatre ==
=== Before time at the Comédie-Française ===
- 1912: Faust by Johann Wolfgang von Goethe, théâtre de l'Odéon
- 1920]: L'Homme à la rose by Henry Bataille, mise-en-scène André Brulé, théâtre de Paris
- 1921: Le Caducée by André Pascal, Théâtre de la Renaissance, théâtre du Gymnase
- 1921: La Bataille by Pierre Frondaie d'après Claude Farrère, mise-en-scène Firmin Gémier, théâtre Antoine
- 1922: L'Insoumise by Pierre Frondaie, théâtre Antoine

=== During time at the Comédie-Française ===
- Admission at the Comédie-Française in 1923
- Sociétaire from 1928 to 1945
- 376th sociétaire
- 1923: Oreste by René Berton from Iphigenia in Tauris by Euripides, Comédie-Française
- 1923: Jean de La Fontaine ou Le Distrait volontaire by Louis Geandreau et Léon Guillot de Saix, Comédie-Française
- 1924: Les Trois Sultanes by Charles-Simon Favart, Comédie-Française
- 1924: La Victoire de Ronsard by René Berton, Comédie-Française
- 1924: L'Adieu by Louis Vaunois, Comédie-Française
- 1924: La Reprise by Maurice Donnay, Comédie-Française
- 1925: Esther by Racine, Comédie-Française
- 1927: La Torche sous le boisseau by Gabriele D'Annunzio, Comédie-Française
- 1928: Les Noces d'argent by Paul Géraldy, Comédie-Française
- 1930: Le Carrosse du Saint-Sacrement by Prosper Mérimée, mise-en-scène Émile Fabre, Comédie-Française
- 1932: Christine by Paul Géraldy, Comédie-Française
- 1934: Andromaque by Racine, mise-en-scène Raphaël Duflos, Comédie-Française – Andromaque
- 1935: Madame Quinze de Jean Sarment, mise-en-scène de l'auteur, Comédie-Française
- 1935: Lucrèce Borgia by Victor Hugo, mise-en-scène Émile Fabre, Comédie-Française – Lucrèce Borgia
- 1936: Hedda Gabler by Henrik Ibsen, mise-en-scène Lugné-Poe, Comédie-Française – Hedda Gabler
- 1936: La Rabouilleuse by Émile Fabre after Honoré de Balzac, mise-en-scène Émile Fabre, Comédie-Française – Flore Brazier
- 1938: Hedda Gabler by Henrik Ibsen, mise-en-scène Lugné-Poe, Comédie-Française – Hedda Gabler
- 1938: Tricolore by Pierre Lestringuez, mise-en-scène Louis Jouvet, Comédie-Française
- 1939: Athalie by Jean Racine, Comédie-Française – Athalie
- 1941: Lucrezia Borgia by Victor Hugo, mise-en-scène Émile Fabre, Comédie-Française – Lucrèce Borgia
- 1942: Iphigénie en Tauride by Goethe, mise-en-scène Jean Yonnel, Comédie-Française – Iphigénie
- 1942: Phèdre by Racine, mise-en-scène Jean-Louis Barrault, Comédie-Française
- 1943: Renaud et Armide by Jean Cocteau, mise-en-scène by the author, Comédie-Française
- 1943: Iphigénie à Delphes by Gerhart Hauptmann, mise-en-scène Pierre Bertin, Comédie-Française – Iphigénie
- 1943: The Satin Slipper by Paul Claudel, mise-en-scène Jean-Louis Barrault, Comédie-Française
- 1944: Horace by Corneille, mise-en-scène Mary Marquet, Comédie-Française

=== After time at the Comédie-Française ===
- 1945: Les Dames de Niskala by Hella Wuolijoki, Théâtre Édouard VII
- 1948: Interdit au public by Roger Dornès and Jean Marsan, mise en scène Alfred Pasquali, Comédie-Wagram
- 1950: La Grande Pauline et les Petits Chinois by René Aubert, mise-en-scène Pierre Valde, Théâtre de l'Étoile
- 1951: Mort d'un rat by Jan de Hartog, mise en scène Jean Mercure, Théâtre Gramont
- 1951: Les Vignes du seigneur by Robert de Flers and Francis de Croisset, mise-en-scène Pierre Dux, Théâtre de Paris
- 1953: Le Ravageur by Gabriel Chevallier, mise-en-scène Alfred Pasquali, Théâtre des Bouffes-Parisiens
- 1955: Les Trois messieurs de Bois-Guillaume by Louis Verneuil, mise-en-scène Christian-Gérard, avec Fernand Gravey, Théâtre des Variétés
- 1957: The Castle by Franz Kafka, mise-en-scène Jean-Louis Barrault Théâtre Sarah Bernhardt
- 1963: Pour Lucrèce de Jean Giraudoux, mise en scène Raymond Gérôme, Festival de Bellac
- 1963: Sémiramis by Marc Camoletti, mise-en-scène Michel de Ré, Théâtre Édouard VII
- 1966: Se trouver de Luigi Pirandello, mise-en-scène Claude Régy, Théâtre Antoine
- 1969: Le Bon Saint-Éloi de Pierrette Bruno, mise en scène Jacques Mauclair, La Pépinière-Théâtre
- 1971: La Maison de Zaza de Gaby Bruyère, mise-en-scène Robert Manuel, with Alfred Pasquali, Théâtre des Nouveautés

== Publications ==
- Vous qui m'aimiez, vous que j'aimais
- Ce que j'ose dire
- Ce que je n'ai pas dit
- Tout n'est peut-être pas dit
