= Alfred Pasquali =

French actor, theatre director (1898–1991)

- Born: Alfred-Adolphe Pasquali; 31 October 1898; Constantinople
- Died: 12 June 1991 (aged 92); 18th arrondissement of Paris, France
- Occupation(s): Actor, theatre director

Alfred-Adolphe Pasquali (31 October 1898 – 12 June 1991) was a French actor and theatre director.

== Theatre ==
=== Comedian ===
- 1921 : La Dauphine by François Porché, Théâtre du Vieux-Colombier
- 1925 : La Robe d'un soir by Rosemonde Gérard, directed by Firmin Gémier, Théâtre de l'Odéon
- 1926 : Dalilah by Paul Demasy, Théâtre de l'Odéon
- 1933 : La Femme en blanc by Marcel Achard, Théâtre Michel
- 1933 : Teddy and Partner by Yvan Noé, Théâtre Michel
- 1933 : Le Vent et la Pluie by Georges de Warfaz after Merton Hodge, Théâtre des Célestins
- 1940 : Plutus after Aristophanes, directed by Charles Dullin, Théâtre de Paris
- 1943 : Feu du ciel, operetta by Jean Tranchant, directed by Alfred Pasquali, Théâtre Pigalle
- 1945 : Topaze by Marcel Pagnol, directed by Alfred Pasquali, Théâtre Pigalle
- 1947 : La Perverse Madame Russel by Joan Morgan, directed by Alfred Pasquali, Théâtre Verlaine
- 1951 : Les Vignes du seigneur by Robert de Flers and Francis de Croisset, directed by Pierre Dux, Théâtre de Paris
- 1952 : La Grande Roue by Guillaume Hanoteau, directed by Roland Piétri, Théâtre Saint-Georges
- 1952 : Many by Alfred Adam, directed by Pierre Dux, Théâtre Gramont
- 1954 : À la Jamaïque, operetta by Francis Lopez and Raymond Vincy, directed by Alfred Pasquali, Théâtre de la Porte-Saint-Martin
- 1956 : La Plume by Pierre Barillet and Jean-Pierre Gredy, directed by Jean Wall, Théâtre Daunou
- 1957 : À la Jamaïque, operetta by Francis Lopez and Raymond Vincy, directed by Alfred Pasquali, Théâtre des Célestins
- 1958 : Coups de pouce by Bernard Frangin, directed by Alfred Pasquali, Théâtre des Célestins
- 1958 : La Saint-Valentin by Raymond Vincy, directed by Alfred Pasquali, Théâtre des Célestins
- 1960 : Madame Sans-Gêne by Victorien Sardou and Émile Moreau, directed by Alfred Pasquali, Théâtre de l'Ambigu
- 1961 : Le Petit Bouchon by Michel André, directed by Jacques Mauclair, Théâtre des Variétés
- 1962 : Madame Sans-Gêne by Victorien Sardou and Émile Moreau, directed by Alfred Pasquali, Théâtre des Célestins
- 1962 : La Contessa ou la Volupté d'être by Maurice Druon, directed by Jean Le Poulain, Théâtre de Paris
- 1962 : Oscar by Claude Magnier, directed by Jacques Mauclair, Théâtre en Rond
- 1963 : Another Man's Wife by Fiodor Dostoïevski, directed by André Charpak, Théâtre Récamier
- 1963 : Monsieur Vautrin d'André Charpak, after Honoré de Balzac, directed by André Charpak, Théâtre Récamier
- 1964 : Comment réussir dans les affaires sans vraiment se fatiguer by Frank Loesser and Abe Burrows, directed by Pierre Mondy, Théâtre de Paris
- 1965 : Deux anges sont venus by Roger Pierre et Jean-Marc Thibault after Albert Husson, directed by Pierre Mondy, Théâtre de Paris
- 1967 : Demandez Vicky by Marc-Gilbert Sauvajon, directed by Jacques-Henri Duval, Théâtre des Nouveautés
- 1968 : The Good Soldier Švejk by Jaroslav Hašek, directed by José Valverde, Théâtre de l'Athénée-Louis-Jouvet
- 1969 : Le Marchand de soleil, musical comedy by Robert Thomas and Jacques Mareuil, directed by Robert Manuel, Théâtre Mogador
- 1971 : La Maison de Zaza by Gaby Bruyère, directed by Robert Manuel, Théâtre des Nouveautés
- 1973 : La Purée by Jean-Claude Eger, directed by Robert Manuel, Théâtre des Nouveautés, Théâtre Fontaine
- 1974 : Le Mari, la Femme et la Mort d'André Roussin, directed by the author and Louis Ducreux, Théâtre Antoine
- 1974 : Le Péril bleu ou Méfiez-vous des autobus by and directed by Victor Lanoux, Théâtre des Mathurins
- 1975 : Peau de vache by Pierre Barillet and Jean-Pierre Gredy, directed by Jacques Charon, Théâtre de la Madeleine
- 1985 : La Prise de Berg-Op-Zoom by Sacha Guitry, directed by Jean Meyer, théâtre des Célestins, puis Théâtre des Nouveautés et Théâtre de la Michodière

=== Theatre director ===
- 1941 : Boléro by Michel Duran, Théâtre des Bouffes-Parisiens
- 1943 : Feu du ciel operetta by Jean Tranchant, Théâtre Pigalle
- 1945 : Topaze by Marcel Pagnol, Théâtre Pigalle
- 1945 : Tristan et Yseut by Lucien Fabre, Théâtre Édouard VII
- 1946 : La Bonne Hôtesse operetta by Jean-Jacques Vital and Serge Veber, music Bruno Coquatrix, Alhambra
- 1947 : Le Maharadjah operetta by Jean-Jacques Vital and Serge Veber, music Bruno Coquatrix, Alhambra
- 1948 : J'irai cracher sur vos tombes by Boris Vian, Théâtre Verlaine
- 1948 : Saïgon 46 by Jean-Raphaël Leygues, Théâtre de la Potinière
- 1948 : Interdit au public by Roger Dornès and Jean Marsan, Comédie-Wagram
- 1949 : Sébastien by Henri Troyat, Théâtre des Bouffes-Parisiens
- 1949 : Baratin operetta by Jean Valmy and André Hornez, music by Henri Betti, L'Européen
- 1950 : M’sieur Nanar operetta by Jean-Jacques Vital, Pierre Ferrari and André Hornez, Théâtre de l'Étoile
- 1952 : Schnock operetta by Marc-Cab and Jean Rigaux, Théâtre des Célestins
- 1954 : À la Jamaïque operetta by Raymond Vincy et Francis Lopez, Théâtre de la Porte-Saint-Martin
- 1954 : La Roulotte by Michel Duran, Théâtre Michel
- 1955 : La Folle Nuit by André Mouëzy-Éon and Félix Gandera, Théâtre des Célestins
- 1956 : Bon appétit, monsieur by Gilbert Laporte, Théâtre de l'Athénée
- 1956 : Ave Marianne, satire of news Pierre Gilbert and Georges Bernardet, Théâtre des Célestins
- 1956 : Meurtre au ralenti by Boileau-Narcejac, Théâtre du Grand-Guignol
- 1956 : L'Assassin by Jean-Pierre Conty, Théâtre du Grand-Guignol
- 1958 : Coups de pouce by Bernard Frangin, Théâtre des Célestins
- 1958 : La Saint Valentin by Raymond Vincy, Théâtre des Célestins
- 1958 : La Fin du monde by Max-Henri Cabridens after Jacques Natanson, Théâtre du Grand-Guignol
- 1959 : La Mauvaise Semence by T. Mihalakeas and Paul Vandenberghe, Théâtre des Arts
- 1960 : Madame Sans-Gêne by Victorien Sardou and Émile Moreau, Théâtre de l'Ambigu
- 1962 : Les Oiseaux rares by Renée Hoste, Théâtre Montparnasse

== Filmography ==
=== Cinema ===
- 1918 : I topi grigri by Emilio Ghione (unsure)
- 1927 : La Jalousie du barbouillé by Alberto Cavalcanti
- 1932 : Fantômas by Paul Fejos
- 1932 : Ma femme...homme d'affaires by Max de Vaucorbeil : Silbermann
- 1932 : Monsieur de Pourceaugnac by Gaston Ravel and Tony Lekain : Sbrigani
- 1933 : Rothchild by Marco de Gastyne : Flips
- 1933 : Âme de clown by Marc Didier and Yvan Noé : Teddy
- 1933 : La Fusée by Jacques Natanson : Baltan
- 1933 : Miss Helyett by Hubert Bourlon and Jean Kemm : Putcardas
- 1933 : To Be Loved by Jacques Tourneur : Émilien
- 1933 : Trois hommes en habit by Mario Bonnard : Gilbert
- 1933 : Un peu d'amour by Hans Steinhoff
- 1935 : Les dieux s'amusent by Reinhold Schünzel and Albert Valentin : the physician
- 1935 : Johnny haute couture by Serge de Poligny
- 1935 : Un homme de trop à bord by Gerhard Lamprecht and Roger Le Bon : Wrensky
- 1936 : The Call of Silence by Léon Poirier
- 1936 : Au service du tsar by Pierre Billon
- 1936 : Donogoo by Reinhold Schünzel and Henri Chomette : the café waiter
- 1936 : Counsel for Romance by Jean Boyer
- 1937 : Mademoiselle ma mère by Henri Decoin : the detective
- 1938 : Raphaël le tatoué by Christian-Jaque : le maître d'hôtel
- 1939 : Le Dernier Tournant by Pierre Chenal : a gamer
- 1939 : Beating Heart by Henri Decoin and Alfred Pasquali
- 1941 : Caprices by Léo Joannon : the director
- 1941 : Ce n'est pas moi by Jacques de Baroncelli : don José
- 1941 : Sins of Youth by Maurice Tourneur : Edmond Vacheron
- 1941 : Pension Jonas by Pierre Caron : professor Tipule
- 1941 : Romance of Paris by Jean Boyer : Nicolas, the impresario
- 1942 : Madly in Love by Paul Mesnier : the bettor
- 1942 : L'Honorable Catherine by Marcel L'Herbier : the chimes seller
- 1942 : The Newspaper Falls at Five O'Clock by Georges Lacombe : Fragonard
- 1942 : Une étoile au soleil by André Zwoboda
- 1943 : The Count of Monte Cristo by Robert Vernay (first period : "Edmond Dantès") : Johannès
- 1943 : Coup de tête by René Le Hénaff : le flyweight
- 1943 : My Last Mistress by Sacha Guitry : the painter
- 1945 : Happy Go Lucky by Marcel L'Herbier : Germain
- 1945 : Le Capitan by Robert Vernay
- 1945 : Trente et Quarante by Gilles Grangier
- 1945 : L'Extravagante Mission by Henri Calef : the duke Rodrigue del Montès
- 1945 : Jéricho by Henri Calef
- 1945 : Women's Games by Maurice Cloche : Simone
- 1946 : Parade du rire by Roger Verdier : M. de Saint-Jules
- 1948 : Les Aventures des Pieds-Nickelés by Marcel Aboulker : Sherlock Coco
- 1948 : Toute la famille était là by Jean de Marguenat : Van-Bico
- 1949 : Forbidden to the Public by Alfred Pasquali : Saturnin
- 1949 : Le Trésor des Pieds-Nickelés by Marcel Aboulker : Sherlock Coco
- 1950 : Nous irons à Paris by Jean Boyer : M. Grosbois
- 1950 : Les Joyeux Pèlerins by Alfred Pasquali : Rameau
- 1951 : Cœur-sur-Mer by Jacques Daniel-Norman : Andive Meunier
- 1951 : Les Mémoires de la vache Yolande by Ernst Neubach : Coquentin
- 1951 : Le Dindon by Claude Barma : Pacarel
- 1952 : No Vacation for Mr. Mayor by Maurice Labro : Tracassin
- 1952 : Cent francs par seconde by Jean Boyer : M. Bourdinet
- 1953 : Ma petite folie by Maurice Labro
- 1953 : Les Amoureux de Marianne by Jean Stelli
- 1954 : J'avais sept filles by Jean Boyer : professor Gorbiggi
- 1955 : Les deux font la paire by André Berthomieu : the theatre manager
- 1956 : Fernandel the Dressmaker by Jean Boyer : Picrafos
- 1956 : L'Auberge en folie by Pierre Chevalier
- 1957 : Amour de poche by Pierre Kast : Bataillon
- 1957 : Sénéchal le magnifique by Jean Boyer
- 1961 : À rebrousse-poil by Pnierre Armand
- 1961 : Snobs ! by Jean-Pierre Mocky : Richard Archambault
- 1962 : It's Not My Business by Jean Boyer : the impresario
- 1963 : Heaven Sent by Jean-Pierre Mocky
- 1964 : La Cité de l'indicible peur by Jean-Pierre Mocky : Simon Triquet's uncle
- 1969 : Aux frais de la princesse by Roland Quignon : the newspaper chief editor
- 1969 : La Honte de la famille by Richard Balducci : Fontan, the rich
- 1973 : Prenez la queue comme tout le monde by Jean-François Davy
- 1976 : Dis bonjour à la dame by Michel Gérard
- 1977 : Gloria by Claude Autant-Lara : the man in the aerobus
- 1978 : Les Ringards by Robert Pouret : M. feuillard
- 1979 : Au bout du bout du banc by Peter Kassovitz : M. Vallet
- 1981 : Signé Furax by Marc Simenon : Hardy Petit
- 1981 : Prends ta rolls et va pointer by Richard Balducci : Pépé
- 1982 : Salut la puce by Richard Balducci

Short films

- 1932 : Un coup manqué by Marco de Gastyne
- 1932 : Le Chimpanzé by Marco de Gastyne
- 1933 : Gonzague by Marco de Gastyne

=== Television ===
- 1966 : Rouletabille chez les Bohémiens, by Robert Mazoyer : Grousillat
- 1967 : Le Golem by Jean Kerchbron : the judge
- 1973 : Lucien Leuwen, telefilm by Claude Autant-Lara
- 1977 : D'Artagnan amoureux, mini-série in five episodes by Yannick Andréi : Colineau du Val

=== Advertisements ===
- 1970 : Renault 12 : the customer (spot publicitaire)

==== Au théâtre ce soir ====
As a comedian

- 1968 : Étienne by Jacques Deval, directed by Louis Seigner, TV director Pierre Sabbagh, théâtre Marigny
- 1968 : Baby Hamilton by Maurice Braddell and Anita Hart, directed by Christian-Gérard, TV director Pierre Sabbagh, théâtre Marigny
- 1969 : Many by Alfred Adam, directed by Pierre Dux, TV director Pierre Sabbagh, théâtre Marigny
- 1969 : Caroline a disparu by Jean Valmy and André Haguet, directed by Jacques-Henri Duval, TV director Pierre Sabbagh, théâtre Marigny
- 1970 : La Roulotte by Michel Duran, directed by Alfred Pasquali, TV director Pierre Sabbagh, théâtre Marigny
- 1971 : Arsenic et vieilles dentelles by Joseph Kesselring, directed by Alfred Pasquali, TV director Pierre Sabbagh, théâtre Marigny
- 1971 : Tapage nocturne by Marc-Gilbert Sauvajon, directed by Jacques-Henri Duval, TV director Pierre Sabbagh, théâtre Marigny
- 1972 : Faites-moi confiance by Michel Duran, directed by Alfred Pasquali, TV director Pierre Sabbagh, théâtre Marigny
- 1972 : Adorable Julia by Marc-Gilbert Sauvajon, directed by René Clermont, TV director Georges Folgoas, théâtre Marigny
- 1973 : La Vénus de Milo by Jacques Deval, directed by Alfred Pasquali, rTV director Georges Folgoas, théâtre Marigny
- 1973 : La Purée by Jean-Claude Eger, directed by Robert Manuel, TV director Georges Folgoas, théâtre Marigny
- 1973 : Le Complexe de Philémon by Jean Bernard-Luc, directed by René Clermont, TV director Georges Folgoas, théâtre Marigny
- 1975 : Demandez Vicky by Marc-Gilbert Sauvajon, directed by Jacques-Henri Duval, TV director Pierre Sabbagh, théâtre Édouard VII
- 1978 : Vous ne l'emporterez pas avec vous by Moss Hart and George Kaufman, directed by Jean-Luc Moreau, TV director Pierre Sabbagh, théâtre Marigny
- 1978 : Les Pavés du ciel by Albert Husson, directed by Claude Nicot, TV director Pierre Sabbagh, théâtre Marigny
- 1979 : Mon crime by Louis Verneuil and Georges Berr, directed by Robert Manuel, TV director Pierre Sabbagh, théâtre Marigny
- 1980 : Peau de vache by Pierre Barillet and Jean-Pierre Gredy, directed by Jacques Charon, TV director Pierre Sabbagh, théâtre Marigny

As theatre director

- 1967 : Bon appétit, Monsieur by Gilbert Laporte, TV director Pierre Sabbagh, théâtre Marigny
- 1967 : Au petit bonheur by Marc-Gilbert Sauvajon, TV director Pierre Sabbagh, théâtre Marigny
- 1968 : Boléro by Michel Duran, TV director Pierre Sabbagh, théâtre Marigny

== Dubbing (selected list) ==
=== Cinema ===
==== Films ====
- Paolo Stoppa in :
  - 1960 : Carthage in Flames : Astarito
  - 1963 : The Leopard : Don Calogero Sedara
- 1946 : How Green Was My Valley (film) : Parry (Arthur Shields)
- 1959 : Some Like It Hot : Osgood Fielding III (Joe E. Brown)
- 1960 : Pollyanna : Mr. Murg (Gage Clarke)
- 1960 : The Apartment : doctor Dreyfuss (Jack Kruschen)
- 1964 : Mary Poppins : M. Dawes Jr. (Arthur Malet)
- 1964 : Tintin and the Blue Oranges : professor Calculus (Félix Fernández)
- 1967 : The Gnome-Mobile : the pumpman (Gil Lamb)
  - James Finlayson with Rognioni in several films with Laurel et Hardy.

==== Animation ====
- 1949 : La Rosa di Bagdad : Burk le sorcier
- 1963 : The Sword in the Stone : Merlin
- 1968 : Aladdin and His Magic Lamp by Jean Image
- 1969 : Tintin and the Temple of the Sun by Eddie Lateste : professor Calculus
- 1970 : The Aristocats

=== Television ===
- 1971 : Duel : le patron du café (Eddie Firestone) (1st dubbing)

== Bibliography ==
- Yvan Foucart : Dictionnaire des comédiens français disparus, Mormoiron : Éditions cinéma, 2008, 1185 p. ISBN 978-2-9531-1390-7
- Olivier Barrot and Raymond Chirat, Noir et Blanc – 250 acteurs français du cinéma français 1930–1960, Paris, Flammarion, 2000, pp. 424–425
