= Jacques Erwin =

French actor (1908-1957)

- Born: Herwin Frédéric Roger Follot; 22 December 1908; Paris, France
- Died: 7 April 1957 (aged 48); Saint-Tropez, France
- Occupation: Actor
- Years active: 1931–1955

Jacques Erwin (born Herwin Frédéric Roger Follot; 22 December 1908 – 7 April 1957) was a French film and stage actor. Erwin was born in Paris, France. He was known for his roles in Remontons les Champs-Élysées (1938), Les cinq gentlemen maudits (1931), and Katia (1938). He died on April 7, 1957 in Saint-Tropez, Var, France.

== Filmography ==
- 1931: Moon Over Morocco by Julien Duvivier as Midlock
- 1931: Tossing Ship by Jean de La Cour as an officier
- 1933: L'atroce menace by Christian-Jaque
- 1933: Vilaine histoire by Christian-Jaque
- 1934: Liliom by Fritz Lang as the suicidé
- 1934: Lui ou elle by Roger Capellani
- 1934: Perfidie by Roger Capellani
- 1935: Stradivarius by Géza von Bolváry as an officer
- 1936: La brigade en jupons by Jean de Limur as Mr. Vilette
- 1936: J'arrose mes galons by René Pujol and Jacques Darmont
- 1936: Street of Shadows by G. W. Pabst
- 1937: The Red Dancer or La Chèvre aux pieds d'or by Jean-Paul Paulin
- 1937: Ramuntcho by René Barberis as Arrochkoa
- 1937: White Nights in Saint Petersburg by Jean Dréville as colonel Toukatchewsky
- 1938: The Corsican Brothers by Géo Kolber
- 1938: Katia by Maurice Tourneur as Trubetzkoïy
- 1938: La maison du maltais de Pierre Chenal as Laurent
- 1938: Remontons les Champs-Elysées by Sacha Guitry and Robert Bibal as Louis XIV young and the duke of Montpensier
- 1939: Nine Bachelors by Sacha Guitry as the duke Julien of Bénéval
- 1939: There's No Tomorrow by Max Ophüls
- 1940: L'An 40 by Fernand Rivers as Jacques
- 1940: The Marvelous Night by Jean-Paul Paulin as the Le forgeron
- 1940: The Italian Straw Hat by Maurice Cammage as Emile
- 1941: Les petits riens by Raymond Leboursier as Alceste
- 1943: La Rabouilleuse by Fernand Rivers as Maxime Gillet
- 1947: Capitaine Blomet by Andrée Feix as Mr. de Cugnac
- 1947: Les jeux sont faits by Jean Delannoy as Jean Aguerra
- 1947: La Grande Volière by Georges Peclet as the colonel
- 1949: Forbidden to the Public by Alfred Pasquali as Hervé Montagné
- 1950: Garou-Garou, le passe-muraille by Jean Boyer as Gaston the stepbrother
- 1951: Gibier de potence by Roger Richebé
- 1953: L'Étrange Désir de monsieur Bard by Geza Radvanyi as l'huissier du casino
- 1955: Marguerite de la nuit by Claude Autant-Lara as the tenor

== Theatre ==
- 1934: Une femme libre by Armand Salacrou, directed by Paulette Pax, Théâtre de l'Œuvre
- 1935: La Complainte de Pranzini et de Thérèse de Lisieux by Henri Ghéon, directed by Georges Pitoëff, Théâtre des Mathurins
- 1936: Elizabeth, la femme sans homme by André Josset, directed by René Rocher, Théâtre du Vieux-Colombier
- 1937: Victoria Regina by Laurence Housman, directed by André Brulé, Théâtre de la Madeleine
- 1938: Victoria Regina by Laurence Housman, directed by André Brulé, Théâtre des Célestins
- 1945: L'Autre Aventure by Marcel Haedrich, directed by Jacques Erwin, Théâtre l'Apollo
- 1948: Interdit au public by Roger Dornès and Jean Marsan, directed by Alfred Pasquali, Comédie-Wagram
- 1950: Mon bébé by Maurice Hennequin after Baby mine by Margaret Mayo, directed by Christian-Gérard, Théâtre de la Porte-Saint-Martin
- 1951: Je l'aimais trop by Jean Guitton, directed by Christian-Gérard, Théâtre Saint-Georges
- 1953: Les Pavés du ciel by Albert Husson, directed by Christian-Gérard, Théâtre des Célestins
- 1955: Un monsieur qui attend by Emlyn Williams, directed by Pierre Dux, Comédie-Caumartin
