= René Clermont =

French actor and playwright

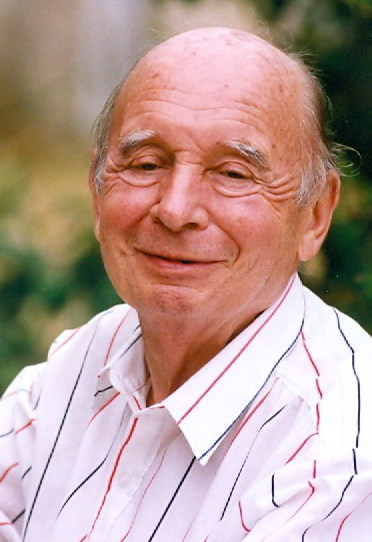
- Born: 14 November 1921; Dakar
- Died: 24 October 1994 (aged 72); 14th arrondissement of Paris
- Occupations: Stage and film actor, playwright

René Clermont (14 November 1921 – 24 October 1994) was a French stage and film actor as well as a playwright.

== Theatre ==
=== Comedian ===
- 1933: Trois pour 100 by Roger Ferdinand, directed by Gabriel Signoret, Théâtre Antoine as Barbouin
- 1944: Hyménée by Nikolai Gogol, directed by Pierre Valde, Théâtre du Vieux-Colombier
- 1947: La terre est ronde by Armand Salacrou, directed by Charles Dullin, Théâtre Sarah-Bernhardt as Giacomo
- 1949: La Perle de la Canebière by Eugène Labiche and Marc-Michel, directed by André Barsacq, Théâtre de l'Atelier
- 1949: Robinson by Jules Supervielle, théâtre de verdure de Charbonnières-les-Bains as Robinson
- 1949: Nuit des hommes by Jean Bernard-Luc, directed by André Barsacq, Théâtre de l'Atelier as Antoine
- 1950: Le Bal des voleurs by Jean Anouilh, directed by André Barsacq, Théâtre de l'Atelier : Dupont-Dufort fils
- 1950: L'Enterrement by Henry Monnier, directed by André Barsacq, Théâtre de l'Atelier : M. Meslin / M. Philibert / M. Poissy / M. Prêcheur / M. Moutardier
- 1951: Danse sans musique by Henri Charles Richard and Albert Gray after Peter Cheyney, directed by René Clermont, Théâtre des Noctambules as John Episton Pell
- 1953: Ion by Bernard Zimmer after Euripides, directed by Henri Soubeyran, Théâtre antique de Vaison-la-Romaine as Nicias
- 1955: Zamore by Georges Neveux, directed by Henri Soubeyran, Théâtre Édouard VII as l'avocat
- 1955: Le Système deux by Georges Neveux, directed by René Clermont, Théâtre Édouard VII as Henri Charlemagne 2
- 1956: Le Capitaine Fanfaron by Bernard Zimmer after Plautus, directed by Henri Soubeyran, Théâtre des Mathurins as Palestrion
- 1960: The Balcony by Jean Genet, directed by Peter Brook, Théâtre du Gymnase as the general
- 1960: La Voleuse de Londres by Georges Neveux, directed by Raymond Gérôme, Théâtre du Gymnase as Teddy
- 1961: Coralie et Compagnie by Maurice Hennequin and Albin Valabrègue, directed by Jean Le Poulain, théâtre Sarah-Bernhardt as Étienne
- 1961: William Conrad by Pierre Boulle, directed by André Charpak, Théâtre Récamier : Wallace Goodfellow
- 1962: Lieutenant Tenant by Pierre Gripari, directed by Jean-Paul Cisife, Théâtre de la Gaîté-Montparnasse as Popov
- 1963: La dame ne brûlera pas by Christopher Fry, directed by Pierre Franck, Théâtre de l'Œuvre as the chaplain
- 1964: Saint Joan by George Bernard Shaw, directed by Pierre Franck, Théâtre Montparnasse : Charles VII
- 1965: Le Hasard du coin du feu by Crébillon fils, directed by Jean Vilar, Théâtre de l'Athénée as Crébillon
- 1966: La Fin du monde by Sacha Guitry, directed by Jean-Pierre Delage, Théâtre de la Madeleine as Mgr Le Landier
- 1967: Chaud et Froid by Fernand Crommelynck, directed by Pierre Franck, Théâtre de l'Œuvre as the master
- 1967: Interdit au public by Jean Marsan, directed by Jean Le Poulain, Théâtre Saint-Georges as Robert Guise
- 1970: Un piano dans l'herbe by Françoise Sagan, directed by André Barsacq, Théâtre de l'Atelier as Edmond
- 1973: Les Quatre Vérités by Marcel Aymé, directed by René Clermont, Théâtre des Variétés
- 1973: Jean de La Fontaine by Sacha Guitry, directed by René Clermont, Théâtre Montparnasse as M. Jannart
- 1974: La Polka by Patrick Modiano, directed by Jacques Mauclair, Théâtre du Gymnase : Evrard Van Caulaert
- 1978: Miam-miam ou le Dîner d'affaires by Jacques Deval, directed by Jean Le Poulain, Théâtre Marigny as le père Tourane
- 1978: Nina d'André Roussin, directed by Jean-Laurent Cochet, théâtre des Célestins, tournée Herbert-Karsenty

=== Theatre director ===
- 1951: Danse sans musique by Henri Charles Richard and Albert Gray after Peter Cheyney, Théâtre des Noctambules
- 1951: La liberté est un dimanche by Pol Quentin, Théâtre Hébertot
- 1955: Le Système deux by Georges Neveux, Théâtre Édouard VII
- 1959: Mon ange by Solange Térac, Comédie-Wagram
- 1971: L'Apollon de Bellac by Jean Giraudoux
- 1973: Une rose au petit déjeuner by Pierre Barillet and Jean-Pierre Gredy, Théâtre des Bouffes-Parisiens
- 1973: Jean de La Fontaine by Sacha Guitry, Théâtre Montparnasse
- 1973: Les Quatre Vérités by Marcel Aymé, Théâtre des Variétés
- 1974: Les Aventures de Tom Jones by Jean Marsan and Jacques Debronckart after Henry Fielding, Théâtre de Paris
- 1975: La Libellule and Aldo Nicolaï, Théâtre des Nouveautés
- 1975: La Balance by Claude Reichman, Théâtre Fontaine
- 1976: La Frousse by Julien Vartet, Studio des Champs-Elysées
- 1981: Le Charimari by Pierrette Bruno, Théâtre Saint-Georges
- 1982: Azaïs by Georges Berr and Louis Verneuil, Eldorado
- 1984: Treize à table by Marc-Gilbert Sauvajon, Théâtre Édouard VII
- 1985: La Berlue by Jean-Jacques Bricaire and Maurice Lasaygues, Petit Marigny then tournée Herbert-Karsenty
- 1986: Gog et Magog by Roger MacDougall and Ted Allan, tournée Herbert-Karsenty
- 1987: La Menteuse by Jean-Jacques Bricaire and Maurice Lasaygues, Théâtre Marigny
- 1992: George et Margaret by Marc-Gilbert Sauvajon and Jean Wall, Théâtre des Bouffes-Parisiens

== Filmography ==
=== Cinema ===
- 1945: Les Cadets de l'océan (by Jean Dréville) - Le Dréan
- 1946: Dawn Devils (by Yves Allégret) - Un des commandos
- 1949: Docteur Laennec (by Maurice Cloche) - Le mime
- 1951: Without Leaving an Address (by Jean-Paul Le Chanois) - Un journaliste (uncredited)
- 1951: The Beautiful Image (by Claude Heymann) - L'homme aux cochons d'Inde
- 1952: Le Crime du Bouif (by André Cerf)
- 1952: La Forêt de l'adieu (by Ralph Habib) - Le notaire
- 1952: Farewell Paris (by Claude Heymann) - Boireau
- 1953: Puccini (Puccini, viste d'arte, vissi d'amore) (by Carmine Gallone and Glauco Pellegrini) - Illica
- 1954: Leguignon guérisseur (by Maurice Labro)
- 1955: Classes élémentaires (Scuola elementare) (by Alberto Lattuada) - Vincenzo Serafini
- 1955: Magic Village (by Jean-Paul Le Chanois) - L'homme chiffres
- 1955: Vous pigez ? (by Pierre Chevalier) - Romano
- 1956: Tides of Passion (by Jean Stelli) - Gros-Jésus
- 1956: Alerte au deuxième bureau (by Jean Stelli)
- 1957: Le Grand Bluff (by Patrice Dally) - Un inventeur
- 1957: La Peau de l'ours (by Claude Boissol) - Le directeur du labo
- 1958: Police judiciaire (by Maurice de Canonge) - Un inspecteur (uncredited)
- 1960: La Dragée haute (by Jean Kerchner)
- 1961: Napoleon II, the Eagle (by Claude Boissol)
- 1962: Le Diable et les Dix Commandements (by Julien Duvivier, sketch : Un seul dieu tu adoreras) - Le père / The father (segment "Un seul Dieu tu adoreras")
- 1962: Sundays and Cybele (by Serge Bourguignon) - Le facteur
- 1963: Carom Shots (by Marcel Bluwal) - Frépillon
- 1966: Who Are You, Polly Maggoo? (by William Klein) - Le producteur
- 1968: Salut Berthe (by Guy Lefranc) - Le commissaire
- 1970: Promise at Dawn (by Jules Dassin) - Mr. Piekielny
- 1970: L'Âne de Zigliara or Une drôle de bourrique (by Jean Canolle)
- 1971: Laisse aller... c'est une valse (by Georges Lautner) - Le divisionnaire
- 1971: La Coqueluche (by Christian-Paul Arrighi)
- 1972: La Nuit bulgare (by Michel Mitrani) - Desnoye
- 1972: Paulina 1980 (by Jean-Louis Bertucelli) - Le père Bubbo / Uncle Bubbo
- 1973: L'accalmie (by Alain Magrou)
- 1981: La Puce et le Privé (by Roger Kay) - Le notaire
- 1984: Fort Saganne (by Alain Corneau) - Monsieur de Saint-Ilette

=== Television ===
==== Comedian ====
- 1962: L'inspecteur Leclerc enquête (Episode: Les Blousons gris, by Marcel Bluwal) - L'éditeur
- 1964: Rocambole (by Jean-Pierre Decourt: M. de Beaupréau.) - Beaupréau (1964–1965)
- 1965-1966: Les Cinq Dernières Minutes (Episode: Napoléon est mort à Saint-Mandé, by Claude Loursais) - Prosper / Langlade
- 1966: Le Chevalier d'Harmental (by Jean-Pierre Decourt) - Buvat
- 1966: Les Cinq Dernières Minutes (Episode: La Rose de fer, by Jean-Pierre Marchand)
- 1966: La chasse au météore (TV Movie, by Roger Iglesis) - judge Proth
- 1968: L'Homme de l'ombre (Episode: L'Aventure, by Guy Jorré) - Le policier privé
- 1970: Reportage sur un squelette ou Masques et bergamasques (by Michel Mitrani) - le monsieur
- 1972: Les Évasions célèbres (Episode: Latude ou l'Entêtement de vivre, by Jean-Pierre Decourt) - Cochard
- 1977: La Famille Cigale - Fabien Damien-Lacour
- 1977: Richelieu ou le Cardinal de Velours (by Jean-Pierre Decourt) - Desbournais
- 1977: Le Loup blanc (TV Movie, by Jean-Pierre Decourt) - Le Courtaud

==== Au théâtre ce soir ====
Comedian

- 1966: Interdit au public by Roger Dornès and Jean Marsan, directed by Jean Le Poulain, TV director Pierre Sabbagh, Théâtre Marigny
- 1968: Le Système Deux by Georges Neveux, directed by René Clermont, TV director Pierre Sabbagh, Théâtre Marigny
- 1970: Et l'enfer Isabelle ? by Jacques Deval, directed by Jacques Mauclair, TV director Pierre Sabbagh, Théâtre Marigny
- 1978: Miam-miam ou le Dîner d'affaires by Jacques Deval, directed by Jean Le Poulain, TV director Pierre Sabbagh, Théâtre Marigny
- 1980: Danse sans musique by Richard Puydorat and Albert Gray after Peter Cheyney, directed by René Clermont, TV director Pierre Sabbagh, Théâtre Marigny

Theatre director

- 1968: Le Système Deux by Georges Neveux, TV director Pierre Sabbagh, Théâtre Marigny
- 1971: La lune est bleue by Hugh Herbert, adaptation Jean Bernard-Luc, TV director Pierre Sabbagh, Théâtre Marigny
- 1972: Adorable Julia by Marc-Gilbert Sauvajon, TV director Georges Folgoas, Théâtre Marigny
- 1973: Les Quatre Vérités by Marcel Aymé, TV director Georges Folgoas, Théâtre Marigny
- 1973: Le Complexe de Philémon by Jean Bernard-Luc, TV director Georges Folgoas, Théâtre Marigny
- 1974: Nick Carter détéctive by Jean Marcillac, TV director Georges Folgoas, Théâtre Marigny
- 1974: La Parisienne by Henry Becque, TV director Georges Folgoas, Théâtre Marigny
- 1974: Hélène ou la Joie de vivre by André Roussin and Madeleine Gray after John Erskine's novel, TV director Georges Folgoas, Théâtre Édouard VII
- 1974: Pluie after Somerset Maugham, TV director Georges Folgoas, Théâtre Édouard VII
- 1975: Le Pape kidnappé by João Bethencourt, adaptation André Roussin, TV director Pierre Sabbagh, Théâtre Édouard VII
- 1975: Les Hannetons by Eugène Brieux, TV director Pierre Sabbagh, Théâtre Édouard VII
- 1976: L'Héritière by Ruth Goetz and Augustus Goetz, TV director Pierre Sabbagh, Théâtre Édouard VII
- 1976: La Frousse by Julien Vartet, TV director Pierre Sabbagh, Théâtre Édouard VII
- 1977 : La Libellule by Aldo Nicolaj, TV director Pierre Sabbagh, Théâtre Marigny
- 1977: L'Archipel Lenoir by Armand Salacrou, TV director Pierre Sabbagh, Théâtre Marigny
- 1977: La Balance by Claude Reichman, TV director Pierre Sabbagh, Théâtre Marigny
- 1977: Caterina by Félicien Marceau, TV director Pierre Sabbagh, Théâtre Marigny
- 1978: Quadrille by Sacha Guitry, TV director Pierre Sabbagh, Théâtre Marigny
- 1979: Miss Mabel by Robert Cedric Sherriff, TV director Pierre Sabbagh, Théâtre Marigny
- 1979: La Gueule du loup by Stephen Wendt, adaptation Marc-Gilbert Sauvajon, TV director Pierre Sabbagh, Théâtre Marigny
- 1980: Une rose au petit déjeuner by Pierre Barillet and Jean-Pierre Gredy, TV director Pierre Sabbagh, Théâtre Marigny
- 1980: Danse sans musique by Richard Puydorat and Albert Gray after Peter Cheyney, TV director Pierre Sabbagh, Théâtre Marigny
- 1981: Monsieur Masure by Claude Magnier, TV director Pierre Sabbagh, Théâtre Marigny

==== TV director ====
- 1980: La Vie des autres, épisode Demain je me marie

== Bibliography ==
- Foucart, Yvan (2007). Dictionnaire des comédiens français disparus 694 portraits, 2147 noms (in French). Mormoiron: Y. Foucart. ISBN 978-2-953-11390-7.
