= Théâtre des Arts =

Théâtre des Arts may refer to:

- Théâtre Antoine-Simone Berriau, a theatre on Boulevard de Strasbourg in Paris which had the name from 1874 to 1876 and 1879–1881.
- Théâtre des Arts of Rouen, the principal theatre of Opéra Rouen Haute Normandie
- Théâtre Hébertot, a theatre on the Boulevard des Batignolles in Paris which had the name from 1907 to 1940
- Théâtre National (rue de la Loi), a theatre in Paris which had the name from 1794 to 1797 and 1803 to 1804.
- Théâtre Verlaine, a theatre on Rue de Rochechouart in Paris, which had the name from 1953 to 1969.
- Le Théâtre des Arts, a theatre in the Paris Las Vegas Hotel in Paradise, Nevada
