= Christian-Gérard =

French actor (1903–1984)

- Born: Christian Gérard Mazas; 4 October 1903; Paris, France
- Died: 27 July 1984 (aged 80); Nice, Alpes-Maritimes
- Occupation: Actor
- Years active: 1922–1970

Christian Gérard Mazas (4 October 1903 – 27 July 1984), known as Christian-Gérard, was a French stage and film actor as well as theater director.

== Theatre ==
=== Comedian ===
- 1932 : Mademoiselle (pièce de théâtre) by Jacques Deval, directed by Jacques Baumer, Théâtre Saint-Georges
- 1934 : Les Temps difficiles by Édouard Bourdet, Théâtre de la Michodière
- 1934 : Le Nouveau Testament by Sacha Guitry, directed by the author, théâtre de la Madeleine
- 1935 : Les Joies du Capitole operette by Jacques Bousquet, Albert Willemetz, music Raoul Moretti, théâtre de la Madeleine
- 1936 : Christian by Yvan Noé, Théâtre des Variétés
- 1937 : Bureau central des idées by Alfred Gehri, directed by Louis Tunc, théâtre de la Michodière
- 1945 : Le Fleuve étincelant by Charles Morgan, directed by Jean Mercure, théâtre Pigalle
- 1946 : Charivari Courteline after Georges Courteline, directed by Jean Mercure, théâtre des Ambassadeurs
- 1948 : La Ligne de chance by Albert Husson, directed by Michèle Verly, théâtre Gramont

=== Theater director ===
- 1946 : César by Marcel Pagnol, théâtre des Variétés
- 1947 : Mort ou vif by Max Régnier, Théâtre de l'Étoile
- 1950 : Jeff by Raoul Praxy, Théâtre de l'Ambigu-Comique
- 1950 : Mon bébé by Maurice Hennequin after Baby mine by Margaret Mayo, théâtre de la Porte-Saint-Martin
- 1950 : Les Héritiers Bouchard by Max Régnier, théâtre de la Porte-Saint-Martin
- 1950 : Le Complexe de Philémon by Jean Bernard-Luc, Théâtre Montparnasse
- 1951 : Cucendron ou la pure Agathe by Robert Favart, Théâtre Saint-Georges
- 1951 : Le Congrès de Clermont-Ferrand by Marcel Franck, La Pépinière-Théâtre
- 1952 : La Cuisine des anges by Albert Husson, théâtre du Vieux-Colombier
- 1952 : Back Street by Michel Dulud, Théâtre Fontaine
- 1952 : La Duchesse d'Algues by Peter Blackmore, Théâtre Michel (Paris)
- 1952 : Zoé by Jean Marsan, Comédie-Wagram
- 1952 : On ne voit pas les cœurs by André Chamson, Théâtre Charles-de-Rochefort
- 1953 : Les Pavés du ciel by Albert Husson, Théâtre des Célestins
- 1953 : Hamlet de Tarascon by Jean Canolle, Théâtre La Bruyère
- 1954 : Carlos et Marguerite by Jean Bernard-Luc, Théâtre de la Madeleine
- 1954 : Le Coin tranquille by Michel André, Théâtre Michel
- 1955 : José by Michel Duran, Théâtre des Nouveautés
- 1955 : La Grande Felia by Jean-Pierre Conty, théâtre de l'Ambigu comique
- 1955 : La Cuisine des anges by Albert Husson, théâtre Édouard VII then théâtre des Célestins
- 1956 : Les Trois Messieurs de Bois-Guillaume by Louis Verneuil, théâtre des Célestins
- 1956 : La Nuit du 4 août by Albert Husson, théâtre Édouard VII
- 1956 : Virginie by Michel André (actor), théâtre Daunou
- 1956 : Ce soir je dîne chez moi by Clare Kummer, Comédie-Wagram
- 1957 : Trois Souris aveugles by Agatha Christie, Théâtre de la Renaissance
- 1958 : Les Parisiens by Irène Strozzi and Jean Parédès, Théâtre de l'Œuvre
- 1958 : Virginie by Michel André, Théâtre Michel
- 1958 : Les portes claquent by Michel Fermaud, théâtre Daunou
- 1959 : Trésor Party by Bernard Régnier after a novel by P. G. Wodehouse, Théâtre La Bruyère
- 1960 : Boeing Boeing by Marc Camoletti, Comédie-Caumartin
- 1960 : Les femmes veulent savoir by Jacques Glaizal and Anne Blehaut, théâtre des Arts
- 1961 : Niki-Nikou by Jacques Bernard, théâtre de la Potinière
- 1961 : Alcool by Jacques Robert (writer), ABC (music-hall)
- 1962 : Gentlemen Prefer Blondes by Anita Loos, théâtre des Arts
- 1963 : Le Complexe de Philémon by Jean Bernard-Luc, Comédie des Champs-Élysées
- 1963 : Des enfants de cœur by François Campaux, Théâtre Michel (Paris)
- 1964 : Des enfants de cœur by François Campaux, théâtre de l'Ambigu comique
- 1964 : Les Cavaleurs by Gaby Bruyère, théâtre de la Potinière
- 1965 : Jamais trop tard by Arthur Long Summer, théâtre des Arts
- 1965 : Des enfants de cœur by François Campaux, théâtre des Arts
- 1966 : Baby Hamilton by Maurice Braddell and Anita Hart, théâtre de la Porte-Saint-Martin
- 1966 : La Bonne Adresse by Marc Camoletti, théâtre des Nouveautés
- 1967 : L'erreur est juste by Jean Paxet, théâtre des Arts
- 1968 : Des enfants de cœur by François Campaux, théâtre Édouard VII

== Filmography ==
Actor

- 1922 : La Femme de nulle part by Louis Delluc (unsure)
- 1927 : L'Occident by Henri Fescourt
- 1928 : L'Âme de pierre by Gaston Roudès
- 1928 : Les Nouveaux Messieurs by Jacques Feyder
- 1928 : Princess Mandane by Germaine Dulac
- 1928 : La Symphonie pathétique by Henri Etievant and Mario Nalpas
- 1932 : Le Fils improvisé by René Guissart
- 1932 : La Merveilleuse Journée by Robert Wyler et Yves Mirande
- 1932 : L'Aimable Lingère, short by Émile-Bernard Donatien
- 1933 : La Poule by René Guissart : Lahoche
- 1933 : Charlemagne by Pierre Colombier : Bardac
- 1933 : L'Épervier by Marcel L'Herbier
- 1934 : Jeanne by Georges Marret
- 1934 : Maître Bolbec et son mari by Jacques Natanson : Valentin
- 1935 : Dora Nelson by René Guissart : Raoul d'Aubigny
- 1935 : Valse royale by Jean Grémillon : Pilou
- 1936 : Anne-Marie by Raymond Bernard : l'amoureux
- 1936 : The Heart Disposes by Georges Lacombe
- 1936 : Le Nouveau Testament by Sacha Guitry and Alexandre Ryder : Fernand Worms
- 1936 : La Vie parisienne by Robert Siodmak : Georges
- 1936 : Paris by Jean Choux : Coco
- 1936 : Samson by Maurice Tourneur : Max d'Audeline
- 1936 : Mon cousin de Marseille short by Germain Fried
- 1937 : Le Petit Bateau short by Pierre Ramelot
- 1938 : The City of Lights by Jean de Limur
- 1939 : Le Café du port by Jean Choux : Xavier Lahurque
- 1939 : Ma tante dictateur by René Pujol : Guy Leroy
- 1940 : Le Café du port by Jean Choux
- 1941 : Boléro by Jean Boyer : Paul Bardot
- 1942 : Le Prince charmant by Jean Boyer : Arsène
- 1942 : Frederica by Jean Boyer : a friend of Gilbert
- 1942 : Signé illisible by Christian Chamborant : Léon Tourlet
- 1943 : Le Colonel Chabert by René Le Hénaff
- 1948 : Mort ou vif (film) by Jean Tedesco

== Television ==
Theater director

- Au théâtre ce soir, TV director Pierre Sabbagh, théâtre Marigny
  - 1966 : Virginie by Michel André
  - 1966 : La Cuisine des anges by Albert Husson
  - 1966 : Les portes claquent by Michel Fermaud
  - 1967 : José by Michel Duran
  - 1967 : Auguste (Au théâtre ce soir) by Raymond Castans
  - 1969 : Ombre chère by Jacques Deval
  - 1970 : Je l'aimais trop by Jean Guitton
