= The Royal Waltz =

The Royal Waltz may refer to:

- The Royal Waltz (1935 film), a German musical film
- The Royal Waltz (1955 film), a West German musical film romance film

== See also ==
- Royal Waltz, a 1936 French-German historical film
