= La pâque socialiste =

19th century play

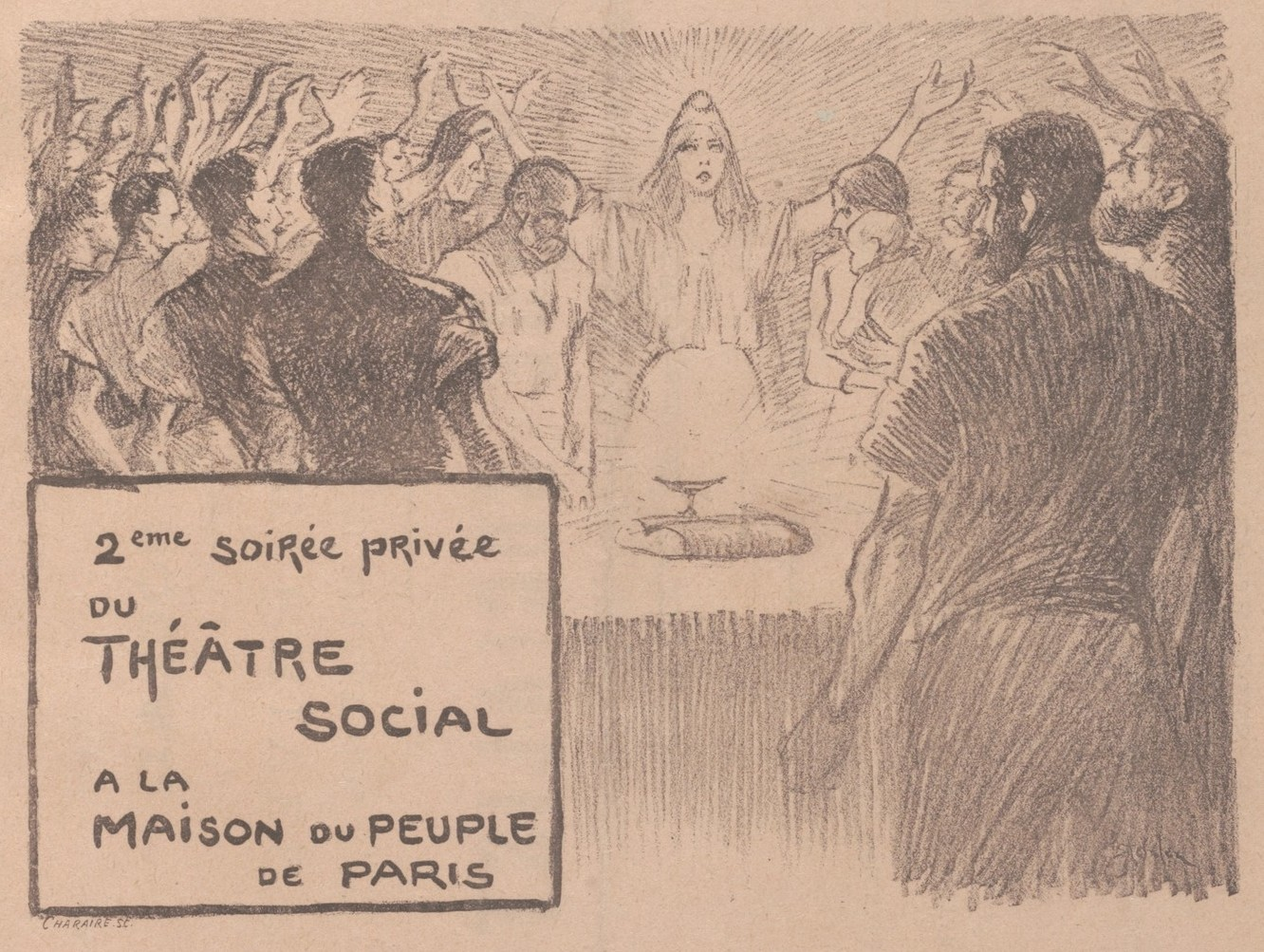
- Detail from program for La pâque socialiste by Théophile-Alexandre Steinlen
- Written by: Emile Veyrin

La pâque socialiste (The Socialist Passover) is a play by Emile Veyrin among the most popular in the 1890s social theater genre.

== Synopsis ==
La pâque socialiste is a five-act play set in Rouen. It opens with the textile factory owner Gilbert Lemoine contemplating his father's deathbed confession of an illegitimate daughter, Micheline, who works the factory's payroll. Lemoine informs her of their relation and her share of the inheritance. In discussing her socialist beliefs, which she credited to Gospel teachings, he shares his plans to bequeath his factory and wealth to the workers. They both share commitment to humanity and disdain for egoism.

When other bosses planned to shutter their factories to avoid losses, Lemoine refuses. The calculating capitalist Rousselot threatens Lemoine's ruin, which comes in Acts 2 and 3. Micheline offers her inheritance to save him from bankruptcy but Lemoine is arrested for fraud, his sharing of inheritance seen as concealment of assets. His suicide attempt by pistol is interrupted by Micheline who says even if he must martyr himself in prison, he cannot abandon the cause.

In Act 4, Rousselot, bragging with egotism, is declared an enemy by Lemoine's factory foreman, Ardouin. The factory reopens, Micheline having given her inheritance to the workers, who promise to restore Lemoine's honor and repay his debts. Micheline shares bread and wine while delivering a catechism on collectivism and morality, the workers echoing her as a chorus. She removes her cloak, revealing a white dress, and extols future social redemption.

== Productions ==
Its cast included Firmin Gémier.

The play was one of two selections in the Opéra Bastille's traditional Bastille Day free theater celebration in 1895. It performed in suburban settings followed by the Montmartre Maison du Peuple in 1897.

== Reception ==
The play had moderate success. The writer Richard Auvray condemned the play's affiliation with a single class.

== Bibliography ==
- Scott, Joan Wallach (2020). "Popular Theater and Socialism in Late-Nineteenth Century France". In Drescher, Seymour (ed.). Political Symbolism in Modern Europe: Essays in Honour of George L.Mosse. Routledge. pp. 192–. ISBN 978-1-00-015983-7.
- Wardhaugh, Jessica (2017). Popular Theatre and Political Utopia in France, 1870—1940: Active Citizens. Palgrave Macmillan. ISBN 978-1-137-59855-4.
