= Victor Haïm =

French playwright and screenwriter (born 1935)

- Born: Victor Lévy; 22 July 1935 (age 91); Asnières-sur-Seine, France
- Occupations: Playwright; screenwriter; actor; director; drama teacher
- Children: Mathilda May

Victor Lévy (born 22 July 1935), better known by his pen name Victor Haïm, is a French playwright, actor, screenwriter, director and drama teacher. His works have been translated and performed in several countries.

He is the father of actress and director Mathilda May and dancer and comedian Judith Haim, known as Judith Réval.

== Biography ==
Victor Lévy, who would later take the pen name Victor Haïm, was born in Asnières-sur-Seine on 22 July 1935, into a Sephardic Jewish family originally from Thessaloniki. His parents then quickly moved to Nantes. The Second World War had dramatic consequences for his family, who had to take refuge in hiding in the Massif Central in 1941. His mother's entire family was exterminated. Returning to Nantes in 1945, he resumed his studies at the Lycée Jules Verne and then at the Lycée Clemenceau, and he entered, in parallel with his school studies, the Conservatoire d'art dramatique de Nantes, where he studied under the direction of Jacques Couturier. He graduated in 1954, without a prize but with a medal for diction. He then moved to Paris, where he studied literature, obtaining a master's degree in modern literature, and entered the École supérieure de Journalisme. He found an internship at Agence France Presse but his passions remained theater and writing. At that time, he wrote two plays that were never performed.

A few months after his marriage to Danielle Lévy, in 1957, he was sent to military service for 28 months, 14 of which were in Algeria.

Returning to Paris in 1960, he began a career as a journalist, first at Agence France Presse, then for an economic newspaper for three years, then for magazines. At the same time, he made a name for himself in 1963 as a playwright, writing for radio and television, and also for the stage, under the pen name Victor Haïm. He borrowed his father's middle name, Joseph Haïm Lévy. He ended his journalistic career in 1977, His first success was in 1963 with his play The Skin of the Carnivore, which was created by Pierre Valde, a professor at the Cours Dullin, and, in particular, Gérard Desarthe, and Michelle Marquais. The play will be performed in more than twenty countries. His career was then launched in France and abroad - his works were translated into fifteen languages. In 1966, his play Die Singing and, a year later, Bladed Weapon were new successes. From then on, he was supported by the Avant-Scène publishing house, which published his new works in their magazine and in the Collection des Quatre-Vents.

He diversified in 1970 by writing a play for puppets, an opera libretto and a ballet-comedy. From 1982 onwards, he wrote screenplays, his first work being Entre Chats et Loups, followed by Les Incorrigibles (1977), Ja Peur (1994), Noces Cruelles (1996). In addition, he became a drama teacher in 1983, at the Théâtre de L'Ombre, then at the Cours Florent. He held this position until 1991. In 1992, he worked at the Regional School of Actors in Cannes, and two years later, at the Department of Culture and Communication at the University of Évry. The French Theatre Centre of UNESCO called on him to fill the post of secretary.

From 1976 onwards, he acted in his own plays. Her first role was in his play Isaac and the Midwife.

== Awards and accolades ==
In 2003, he was awarded the Molière Award for his work Stage Games (Jeux de Scène). He was awarded Best Playwright.

== Theatre ==
=== Author ===
- 1963: The Skin of the Carnivore
- 1966: Elzevir - Comedy
- 1966: Die Singing - Drama
- 1967: The Knife
- 1968: My Cello for a Horse - Modern Drama
- 1971: La Peau d'un fruit - Monologue
- 1972: Next year in Baden Baden
- 1973: Abraham and Samuel - Comedy
- 1973: Who Killed the General?
- 1974: How to Harpoon the Shark - Comedy
- 1974: The Abyss
- 1974: The Vampires Subsidized
- 1975: La Visite - Comedy
- 1975: The Loopholes
- 1975: The Intervention
- 1976: Isaac and the Midwife - Comedy-drama
- 1976: The Strike
- 1976: La Servante - Comedy,
- 1977: An Enemy of the People / Ibsen - Literary Adaptation
- 1979: The Bathtub - Drama,
- 1980: The Eagles
- The Wizard of Saratoga (1980)
- 1980: L'Escalade - Comédie gratante
- 1981: Steak
- 1981: Belle Famille - Tragic Farce
- 1981: Tune Your Violins - Modern Drama
- 1981: Women of God - Drama
- 1982: La Chaloupe
- 1985: The Butcher's Fantasies - Squeaky comedy
- 1986: La Valse du Hasard (The Waltz of Chance) - Drama
- 1986: The Eternal Husband / Dostoevsky - Literary adaptation
- 1988: The Grand Host - Comedy
- 1989: David's Laughter - Modern Drama
- 1990: The Ménate No Longer Responds
- 1992: The Coveted Widow - Comedy
- 1992: The Woman Who Strikes - Tragic Farce
- 1993: Standing Woman
- 1994: Renata, Josepha and the Men - Drama
- 1994: Flesh amour - Comedy
- 1996: Le Trou - Comedy
- 1999: The Vampire Always Sucks Twice - Comedy
- 1999: The Scene
- 2000: Velouté - Comédie gratante
- 2001: Double Tour - Comedy
- 2001: The Treatment - Comedy
- 2001: L'Abîme - Comédie
- 2001: Agitato - Drama
- 2001: 15 for me! - Squeaky Comedy
- 2001: L'Appel - Comédie gratante
- 2001: De Toulouse à Bordeaux - Comédie gratante
- 2001: Sphères - Comédie gratante
- 2001: Au Fil de l'onde - Comédie gratante
- 2002: Jeux de scène - Comédie gratante
- 2006: The Seven Deadly Sins: Avarice - Co-author
- 2009: Alma and Jeremiah

=== Actor ===
- 1976: Isaac and the Midwife by Victor Haïm, directed by Étienne Bierry, Théâtre de Poche Montparnasse
- 1981: Attez vos violons by Victor Haïm, directed by Étienne Bierry, Théâtre de Poche Montparnasse

== Filmography ==
=== Screenwriter ===
- 1978: An Enemy of the People TV, (French adaptation)
- 1979: The Handmaid's Aid TV
- 1980: The Incorrigibles (TV series)
- 1980 : Le Petit Théâtre d'Antenne 2 (TV series)
- 1985: Between Cats and Wolves (TV, dialogue)
- 1992: Fear TV
- 1995: Nestor Burma
- 1996: Cruel Wedding (adaptation and dialogue)

=== Film actor ===
- Blame It on Rio (1984) as Bernardo
- 1986: Paulette, the Poor Little Billionaire: A Distinguished Guest
- Isabelle Eberhardt (1991) as Dr. Taste
- 1992: My Engagement to Hilda as Father
- 1993: The Navel of the World
- 1997: The Truth If I Lie!
- 2001: The Truth If I Lie! 2: Rabbi
- 2004: Tout pour l'sorreille: l'usher
- 2007 : Délice Paloma : Monsieur Herad
- 2007 : La Déchirure, short film by Mikael Buch : the rabbi
- 2015: The Antiquarian by François Margolin: Claude Weinstein's friend

=== Television actor ===
- 1978: Il était un musicien, episode: Monsieur Satie by Jean Valère (series) : Satie's lawyer
- 1980 : Le Petit Théâtre d'Antenne 2 (series)
- 1982: The New Tiger Brigades by Victor Vicas, episode The Vampires of the Carpathians by Victor Vicas as the Doctor
- Farewell Don Juan (1989) as Omar
- 1993 : Commissaire Moulin (series) : Professor Rosenberg
- 1996 : Commandant Nerval (série) : Dimitrie
- 1998: When an Angel Passes by as Mr. Leone
- 2000: The Teacher: The Professor
- 2000: The Lawyer (series) as President
- 2003: The Gift made to Catchaires: Yehuda
- 2003: The Year of My Seven Years as Sam
- 2004: The Client
- 2004 : Central Nuit (series) : Margol
- 2008 : La Traque : Geissman

== Publication ==
- Les Fantaisies microcosmiques, collectif, L'Avant-Scène Théâtre, collection Des Quatre Vents, 2004.

== Distinctions ==
(Pour son œuvre théâtrale)

- 1971 : prix Ibsen avec La Peau d'un fruit
- 1974 : prix des « U » de la pièce la plus originale de l'année pour Abraham et Samuel
- 1977 : prix Lugné-Poe de la SACD pour La Servante, Isaac et la Sage-Femme
- 1986 : prix Plaisir du théâtre pour Les Fantasmes du boucher
- 1986 : prix du théâtre de la SACD pour l'ensemble de son œuvre
- 1986 : prix Jacques Audiberti pour La Valse du hasard
- Molières 1994 : nomination au Molière du meilleur auteur francophone vivant pour Chair amour
- 2001 : prix Charles Oulmont-Fondation de France pour l'ensemble de son œuvre
- Molières 2003 : Molière du meilleur auteur francophone vivant pour Jeux de scène
- 2003 : Grand prix du théâtre de l’Académie française pour l'ensemble de son œuvre
