= Renaud et Armide =

Play written by Jean Cocteau (1943)

Renaud et Armide is a three acts tragedy written by French dramatist Jean Cocteau, premiered on 13 April 1943 at the Comédie-Française. It is based on an episode from Jerusalem Delivered by Torquato Tasso.

A TV version of the play was made in 1969, directed by Marcel Cravenne.

== Cast ==
- Marie Bell: Armide
- Mary Marquet: Oriane
- Maurice Escande: Renaud
- Jacques Dacqmine: Olivier
- Theatre director: Jean Cocteau
- Scenic design: Christian Bérard
