= René Dupuy =

French actor, theater director and theater manager

- Born: 17 May 1920; New York City
- Died: 1 August 2009 (aged 89)
- Occupation(s): Actor, theater director, theater manager

René Dupuy (17 May 1920 – 1 August 2009) was a French actor, theater director and theater manager.

A student at the Conservatoire national d'art dramatique in Paris, René Dupuy was later theater manager of:

- the Théâtre Gramont from 1954 to 1973,
- the Théâtre de l'Athénée from 1966 to 1972,
- the Théâtre Fontaine from 1972 to 1985.

He was professor of dramatic art at the école de la Rue Blanche.

== Theatre ==
=== Comedian ===
- 1950: Henri IV by William Shakespeare, directed by Jean Vilar, Festival d'Avignon
- 1950: Le Cid by Corneille, directed by Jean Vilar, Festival d'Avignon
- 1950: Le Bal des voleurs by Jean Anouilh, directed by André Barsacq, Théâtre des Arts
- 1951: The Prince of Homburg by Heinrich von Kleist, directed by Jean Vilar, Festival d'Avignon
- 1956: Irma la douce by Marguerite Monnot, directed by René Dupuy, Théâtre Gramont
- 1958: Édition de midi by Mihail Sebastian, directed by René Dupuy, Théâtre Gramont
- 1963: You never can tell by George Bernard Shaw, directed by René Dupuy, Théâtre Gramont
- 1965: Pantagleize by Michel de Ghelderode, directed by René Dupuy, Théâtre Gramont
- 1966: La Convention de Belzébir by Marcel Aymé, directed by René Dupuy, Théâtre de l'Athénée
- 1966: Exit the King by Eugène Ionesco, directed by Jacques Mauclair, Théâtre de l'Athénée
- 1970: Exit the King by Eugène Ionesco, directed by Jacques Mauclair, Théâtre de l'Athénée
- 1977: Au théâtre ce soir : Les Petits Oiseaux d'Eugène Labiche, directed by René Dupuy, TV director Pierre Sabbagh, Théâtre Marigny
- 1984: Au théâtre ce soir : La Pomme by Louis Verneuil and Georges Berr, directed by René Dupuy, TV director Pierre Sabbagh, Théâtre Marigny

=== Theatre director ===
- 1948: La Vengeance d'une orpheline russe by Henri Rousseau, Théâtre de l'Œuvre
- 1949: La Vengeance d'une orpheline russe by Henri Rousseau, Studio des Champs-Élysées
- 1951: La calandria by Bernardo Dovizi da Bibbiena, Festival d'Avignon
- 1954: Le Héros et le soldat by George Bernard Shaw, Théâtre Gramont
- 1955: Le Quai Conti by Guillaume Hanoteau, Théâtre Gramont
- 1956: À la monnaie du Pape by Louis Velle, Théâtre Gramont
- 1956: Irma la douce by Alexandre Breffort and Marguerite Monnot, Théâtre Gramont
- 1956: The Playboy of the Western World by John Millington Synge, Théâtre Gramont
- 1957: Pericles, Prince of Tyre by William Shakespeare, Théâtre de l'Ambigu
- 1958: Édition de midi by Mihail Sebastian, Théâtre Gramont
- 1959: La Double Vie de Théophraste Longuet by Jean Rougeul after Gaston Leroux, Théâtre Gramont
- 1960: La Petite Datcha by Vasiliei Vasil'evitch Chkvarkin, Théâtre Daunou
- 1961: Visa pour l'amour by Raymond Vinci and Francis Lopez, Gaîté lyrique
- 1961: Un certain monsieur Blot by Robert Rocca after Pierre Daninos, Théâtre Gramont
- 1962: À notre âge on a besoin d'amour and La Cloison by Jean Savy, Théâtre de l'Alliance française
- 1962: Le Timide au palais by Tirso de Molina, Théâtre Gramont
- 1963: You never can tell by George Bernard Shaw, Théâtre Gramont
- 1964: Les Fausses Confidences de Marivaux, Théâtre de l'Ambigu
- 1965: Pantagleize by Michel de Ghelderode, Théâtre Gramont
- 1965: Du vent dans les branches de sassafras by René de Obaldia, Théâtre Gramont
- 1966: La Convention de Belzébir by Marcel Aymé, Théâtre de l'Athénée-Louis-Jouvet
- 1967: A Report to an Academy by Franz Kafka, Théâtre Gramont
- 1968: After the Rain by John Griffith Bowen, Théâtre de l'Athénée-Louis-Jouvet
- 1969: Les Grosses Têtes by Jean Poiret and Michel Serrault, directed by and with Jean Poiret, Théâtre de l'Athénée-Louis-Jouvet
- 1969: Popaul et Juliette by André Maheux and Mireille Hartuch, Théâtre Gramont
- 1971: Fortune and Men's Eyes by John Herbert, Théâtre de l'Athénée
- 1972: Le Roi des cons by Georges Wolinski, Théâtre Fontaine
- 1973: Chante, Papa, chante by Marcel Moussy, Théâtre des Nouveautés
- 1974: Au théâtre ce soir : Le Vison à cinq pattes by Constance Coline after Peter Coke, TV director Jean Royer, Théâtre Marigny
- 1977: Au théâtre ce soir: Les Petits Oiseaux by Eugène Labiche, TV director Pierre Sabbagh, Théâtre Marigny
- 1979: Troilus and Cressida by William Shakespeare, Théâtre Fontaine
- 1982: Lili Lamont by Arthur Whithney, Théâtre Fontaine
- 1984: Au théâtre ce soir: La Pomme by Louis Verneuil and Georges Berr, TV director Pierre Sabbagh, Théâtre Marigny
- 1988: Exit the King by Eugène Ionesco
