= Andrée Mégard =

French actress (1869–1952)

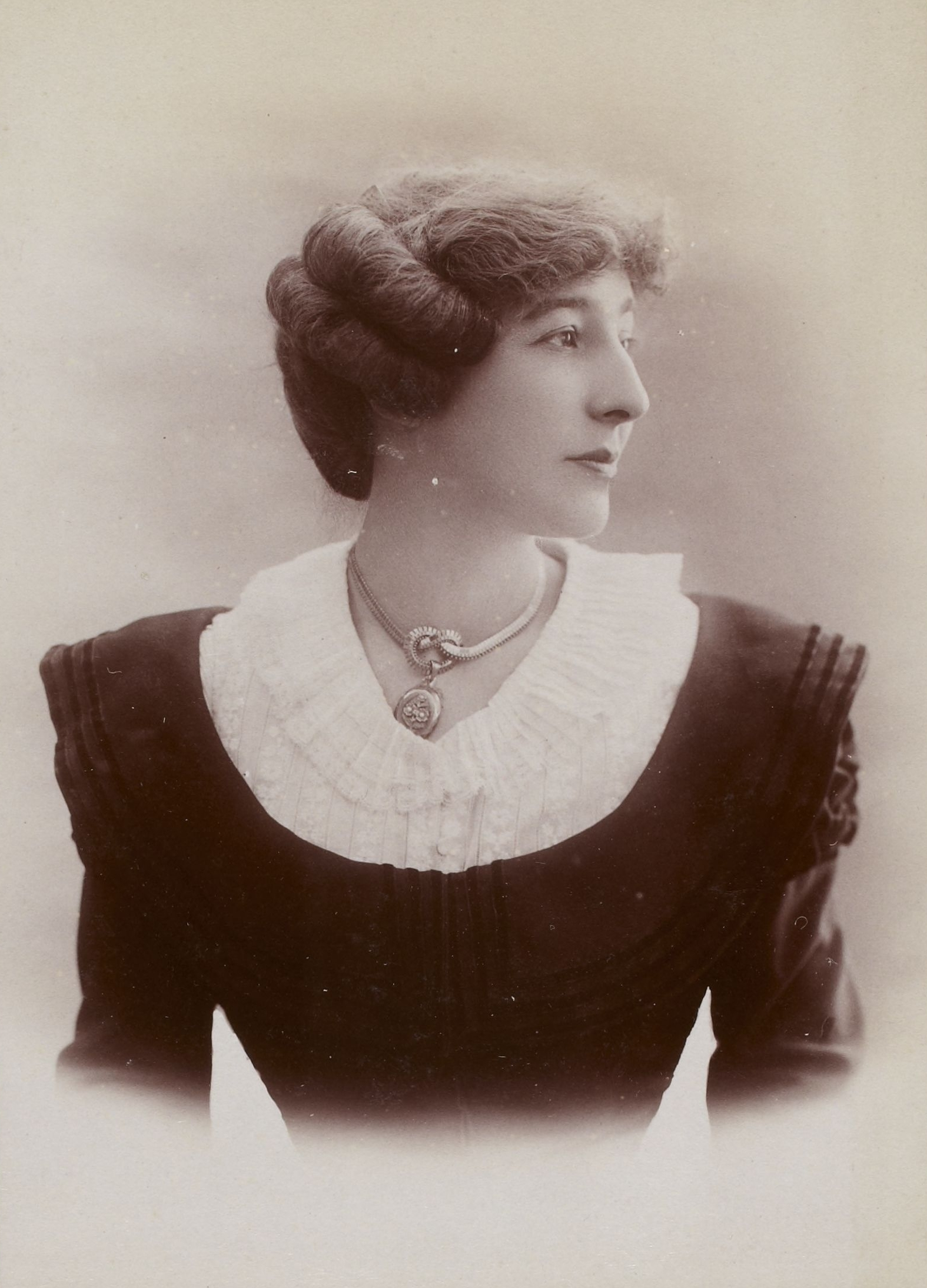
- Andrée Mégard photographed by Jean Reutlinger
- Born: Marie Adélaïde Alexandrine Chamonal; 1869; Saint-Amour, French Third Republic
- Died: 1952 (aged 82–83)
- Other names: Andrée Mégard-Gémier; Andree Megard
- Occupation: Actress
- Spouse: Firmin Gémier

Andrée Mégard (born Marie Adélaïde Alexandrine Chamonal, 1869–1952), was a French actress and stage beauty.

== Early life ==
Marie Adélaïde Alexandrine Chamonal was born in 1869, in Saint-Amour, in the Jura Mountains. Her parents were "well-off peasants" who apprenticed her to an aunt who ran a dry good store; she ran away from the aunt at fifteen, and landed alone in Paris.

== Career ==
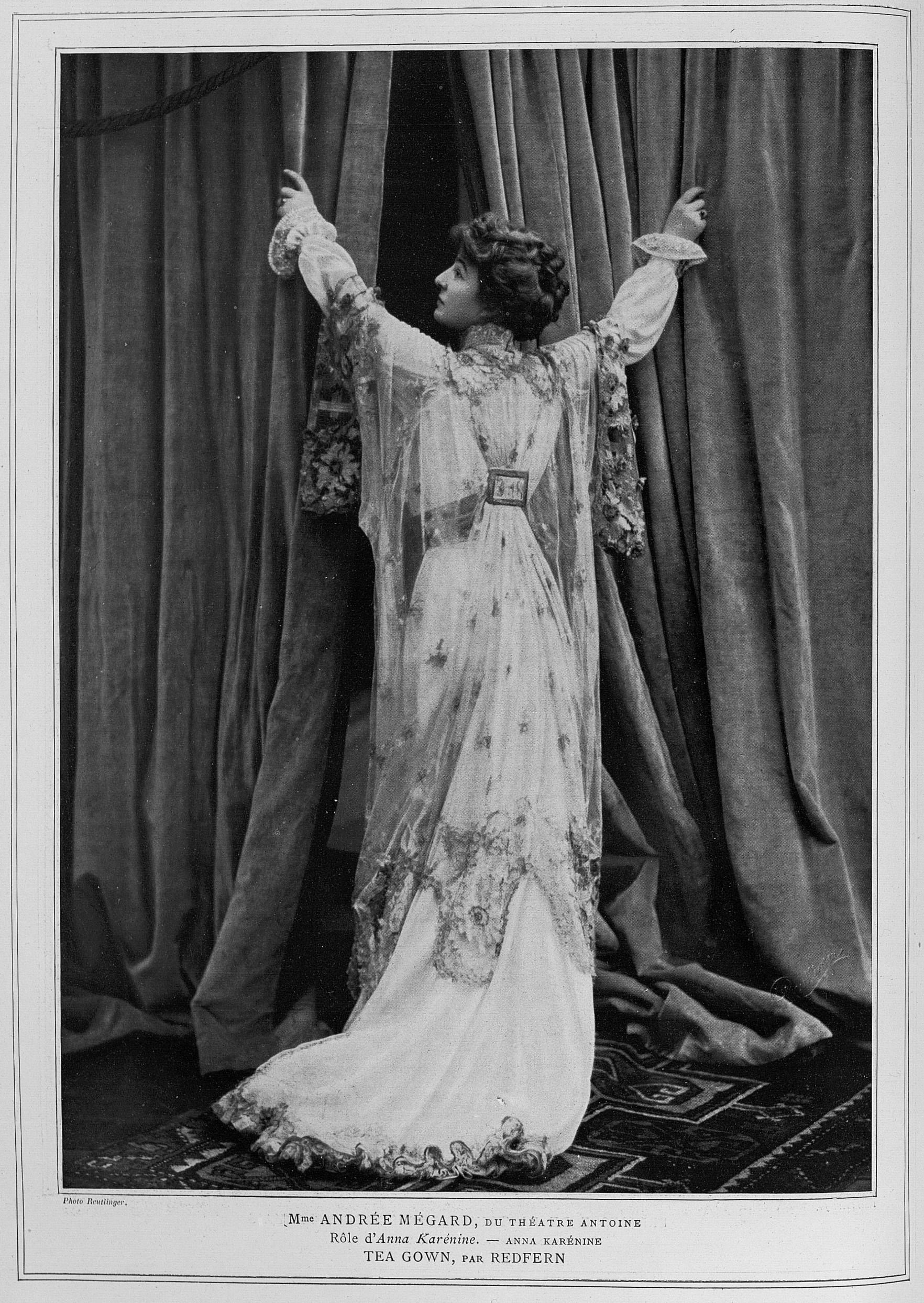
Mégard posing to show the back of a Redfern tea gown with a transparent embroidered jacket, worn when she played Anna Karenina, 1907

Mégard worked as an artists' model as a young woman in Paris, especially for artist Auguste Toulmouche. She was on the Paris stage from 1896 to 1925, appearing in shows including Shakepearean tragedies, comedies, and plays directed by her husband, Firmin Gémier. She played the love interest, Roxane, in a 1913 revival of Edmond Rostand's Cyrano de Bergerac, while she was having an affair with Rostand himself. She starred in a stage adaptation of Anna Karenina in Paris in 1907. In 1908 she knocked herself unconscious on stage during an emotional scene. She appeared in one silent film, La tour de Nesle (1909).

Mégard was considered "tall, graceful, and distinguished looking." Her hairstyles and the designs of her costumes, hats, and gowns were reported in detail, internationally, often with photographs or drawings showing their features. She was especially known for wearing the creations of Redfern, the English design house. A New York writer in 1906 declared of the Paris theatre scene that "Even the critics themselves, disdainful of the pieces they have had to comment upon, turn their clever pens to the question of clothes." "Madame Mégard has for many years back been one of the recognized beauties of the French stage, and as such as earned more than one succés de jolie femme," commented a London writer in 1907, "but it is only recently that her power as an actress has been fully realized."

== Personal life ==
Andrée Mégard married actor and director Firmin Gémier. She was an enthusiastic automobile driver by 1909; "There is no more intrepid 'chauffeuse' on the white roads of France," noted one report, after she and her sister were injured in a motoring accident in Brittany. Mégard died in 1952.
