= Max Régnier =

French actor and director (1907–1993)

Max Régnier (4 December 1907 – 5 August 1993) was a French dramatist, playwright, theater director and actor. He was managing director of the théâtre de la Porte-Saint-Martin from 1949 up to 1969.

He was the father of actor Yves Rénier.

== Filmography ==
=== Cinema ===
as an actor unless stated otherwise

- 1936 : Le Coup de trois by Jean de Limur : le secrétaire du commissaire
- 1936 : Les Croquignolle, short by Robert Péguy : Monsieur Croquignolle
- 1937 : Monsieur Bégonia by André Hugon : Max / Monsieur Bégonia
- 1938 : L'Héritage d'Onésime by André Hugon – short
- 1948 : Mort ou vif (film) by Jean Tedesco (+ scriptwriting and dialogues)
- 1950 : L'Art d'être courtier by Henri Verneuil – short (only co scriptwriter)

=== Television ===
Actor

- 1979 : Au théâtre ce soir, Les Petites Têtes by André Gillois and Max Régnier, directed by Pierre Sabbagh
- 1981 : Au théâtre ce soir, Mort ou vif by Max Régnier, directed by Pierre Sabbagh

== Theater ==
- 1944 : Eclats de rire, directed by Émile Audiffred, théâtre des Célestins
- 1947 : Mort ou vif de Max Régnier, directed by Christian-Gérard, théâtre de l'Étoile (author and actor)
- 1948 : Il vaux mieux en rire, directed by Émile Audiffred, Les Tournées Audiffred
- 1955 : Les Petites Têtes by André Gillois and Max Régnier, directed by Fernand Ledoux, Théâtre Michel (Paris) : Daniel (co writer and actor)
- 1957 : Champagne et Whisky by Max Régnier, directed by the author, théâtre de la Renaissance : Lestissac (author, theatre director and actor)
- 1963 : Bonsoir Madame Pinson after Arthur Lovegrove, adaptation by Max Régnier and André Gillois, directed by Jean-Paul Cisife, théâtre de la Porte-Saint-Martin (co adaptator)
- 1965 : Le Plus grand des hasards by Max Régnier and André Gillois, mise-en-scène Georges Douking, théâtre de la Porte-Saint-Martin : Hubert Cabanel (coauteur et acteur)
