= Serge Nadaud =

French actor (1906–1995)

- Born: 14 May 1906; Bakhmut, Yekaterinoslav Governorate Russian Empire
- Died: 18 July 1995 (aged 89); Cannes, Alpes-Maritimes France
- Occupation: Actor

Serge Nadaud (May 14, 1906 – July 18, 1995) was a Russian-born French stage and film actor. He was born Eugene Rabinowitch to a Jewish family in Bakhmut which was then part of the Russian Empire. Sometime after the Russian Revolution of 1917 his family emigrated to France and settled there. He was a noted voice actor, dubbing foreign films for release in France.

== Selected filmography ==
- The Phantom Gondola (1936)
- The Emigrant (1940)
- Forbidden to the Public (1949)
- Under the Sky of Paris (1951)
- Suspicion (1956)
- Sénéchal the Magnificent (1957)
