= Montagnac, Hérault =

Montagnac
- Commune
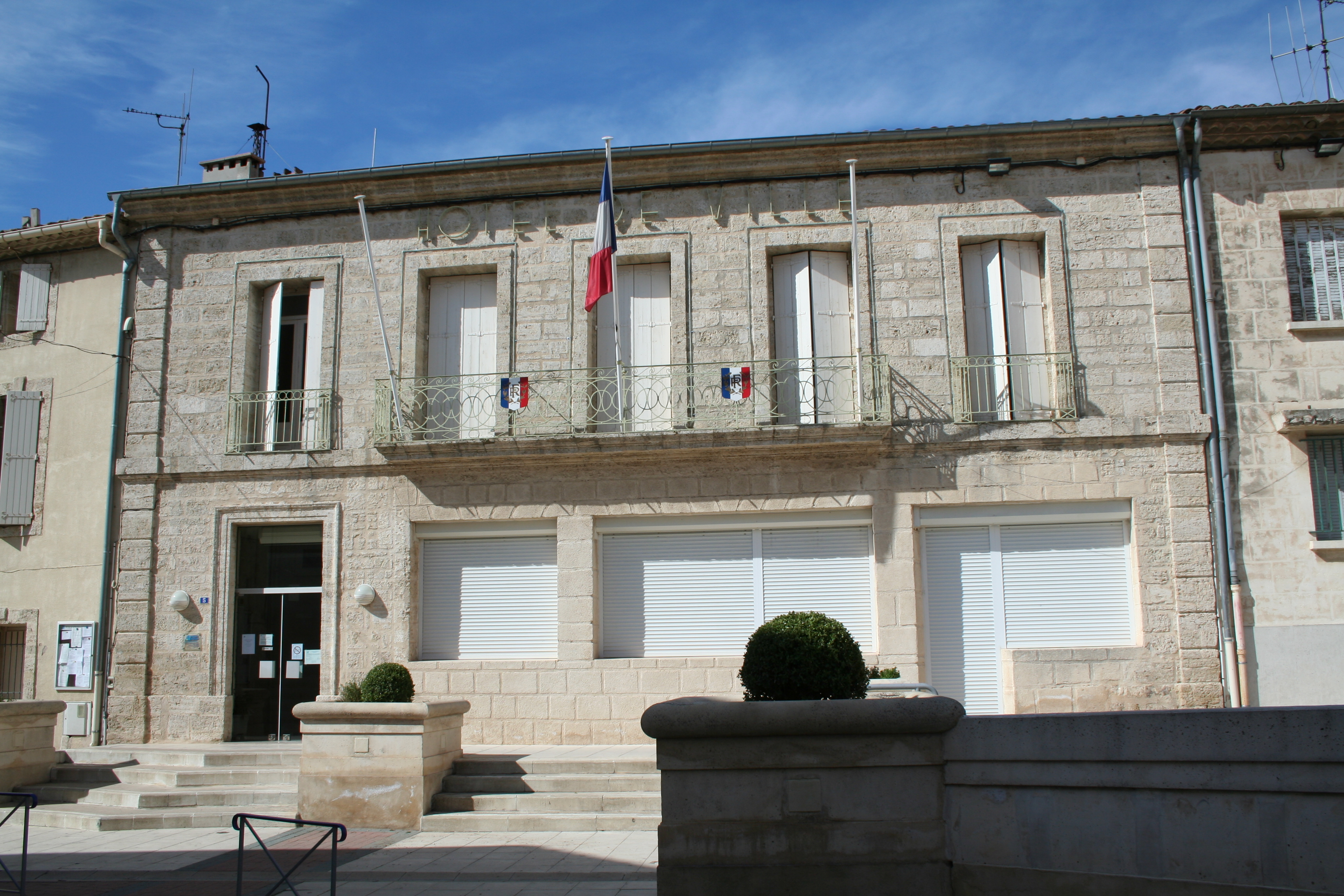
- Town hall

- Coat of arms
- Location of Montagnac
- Location within France Location within Occitanie
- Coordinates: 43°28′55″N 3°29′02″E
- Country: France
- Region: Occitania
- Department: Hérault
- Arrondissement: Béziers
- Canton: Mèze
- Intercommunality: CA Hérault Méditerranée

Government
  - Mayor (2020–2026): Yann Llopis
- Area^{1}: 39.81 km^{2} (15.37 sq mi)
- Highest elevation: 172 m (564 ft)
- Lowest elevation: 8 m (26 ft)
- Population (2023): 4,515
  - Density: 113.4/km^{2} (293.7/sq mi)
- Time zone: UTC+01:00 (CET)
  - Summer (DST): UTC+02:00 (CEST)
- INSEE/Postal code: 34162 /34530
- ^{1} French Land Register data, which excludes lakes, ponds, glaciers > 1 km^{2} (0.386 sq mi or 247 acres) and river estuaries.

Montagnac (French pronunciation: [mɔ̃taɲak]; Occitan: Montanhac) is a commune in the Hérault department in the Occitanie region in southern France.

== History ==
- The Saint-Martin Chapel was mentioned in 847.
- Protestant population: the town was devastated during the French Wars of Religion.
- The feudal castle, Château de Lavagnac, was dismantled in the 17th century on the orders of Richelieu and remodelled in accordance with the tastes of the day. It is currently the subject of an enormous tourism project which is opposed by a minority of the local population.

== Population ==
Its inhabitants are called Montagnacois in French.

Historical population
Year	Pop.	±% p.a.
1968	3,021	—
1975	2,774	−1.21%
1982	2,897	+0.62%
1990	2,953	+0.24%
1999	2,981	+0.10%
2007	3,563	+2.25%
2012	3,731	+0.93%
2017	4,336	+3.05%
2023	4,515	+0.68%
Source: INSEE

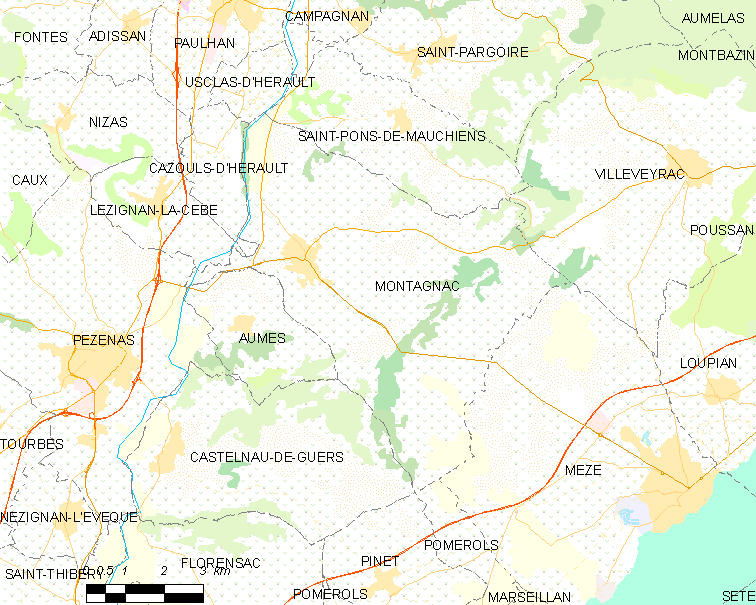
Map

== International relations ==
Montagnac is twinned with Nerpio in Spain.

== Personalities ==
- Jean Henri Latude, French prisoner, famous for his escapes
- Paula Delsol, novelist and film director.
- Charles Camichel (1871–1966) physician born in Montagnac.
- Samuel Honrubia French International handball player, World champion, European champion, Olympic champion and France champion. Montagnac was his first club, he play now for PSG.

== Sights ==
- Église Saint-André* 12th/14th century : steeple, open tower, doorway with arching and colonnettes, machicolated porch, choir with seven stretches of vaulted wall, 15th century stone bas-relief of Christ, 16th century wooden statue of St Peter, painting of the Holy Family by Bestieu from 1830, four caryatids from 1750 and 1759, wooden Virgin from 1780, 18th century pulpit, an 18th-century main altar; eleven 17th century stalls, bell from 1492

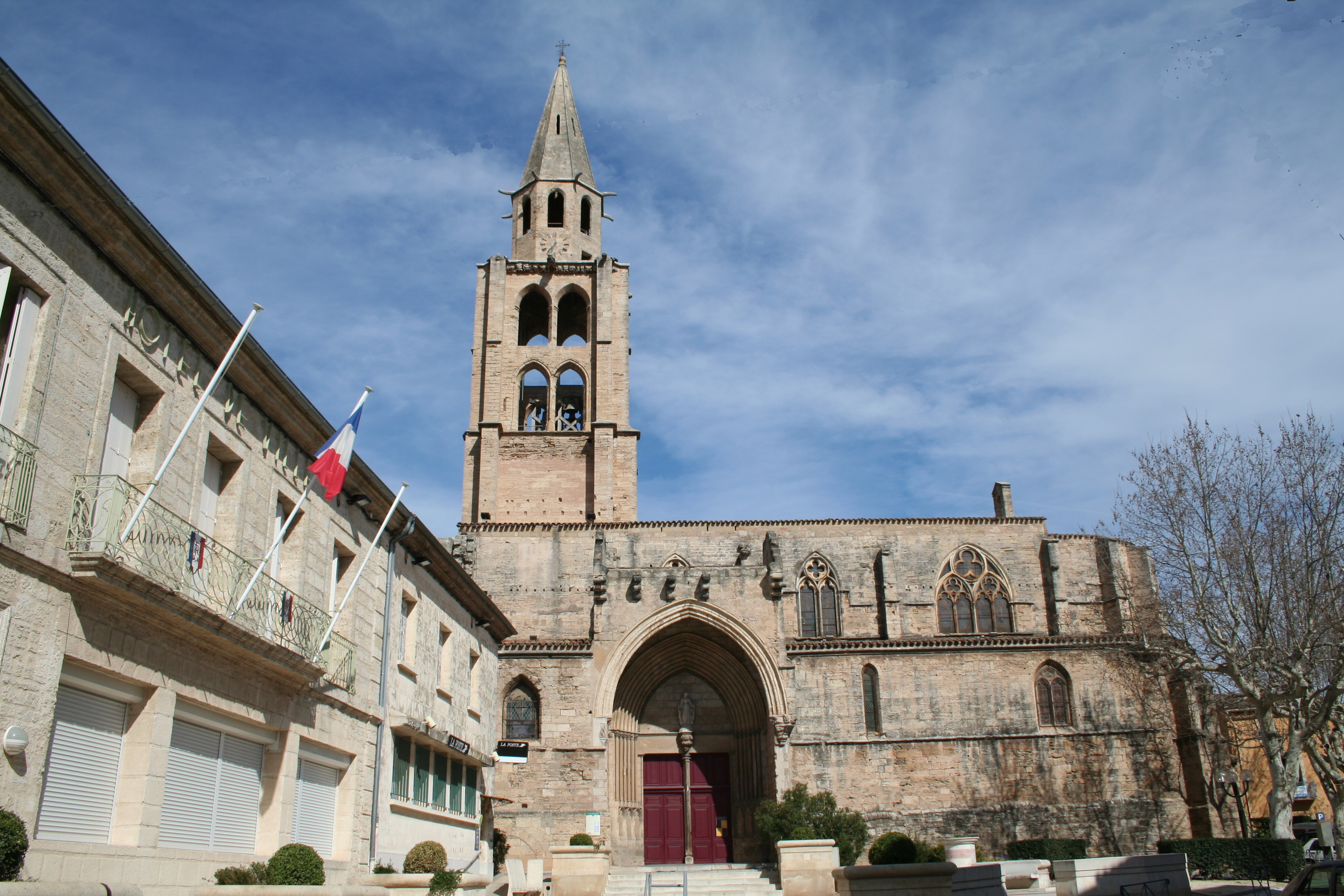
Église Saint-André

- Chapelle Saint-Martin de la Garrigue 12th century : blind arcades, half domed apse.
- Chapelle des pénitents 18th century.
- Chapelle Notre-Dame-de-la-Peyrière 19th century.
- Hôtel de Rat.

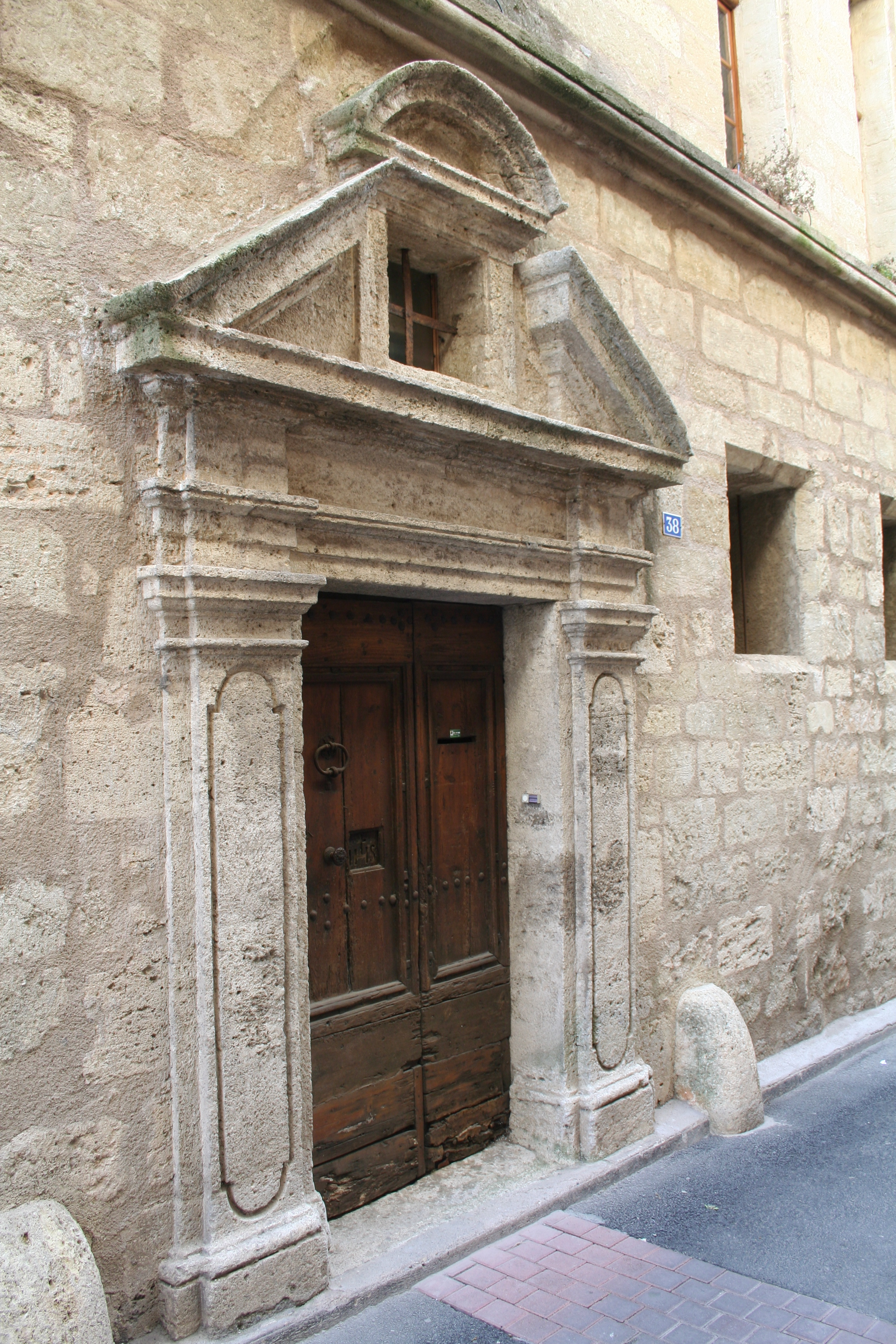
Hôtel de Rat

- Hôtel de Pegat.

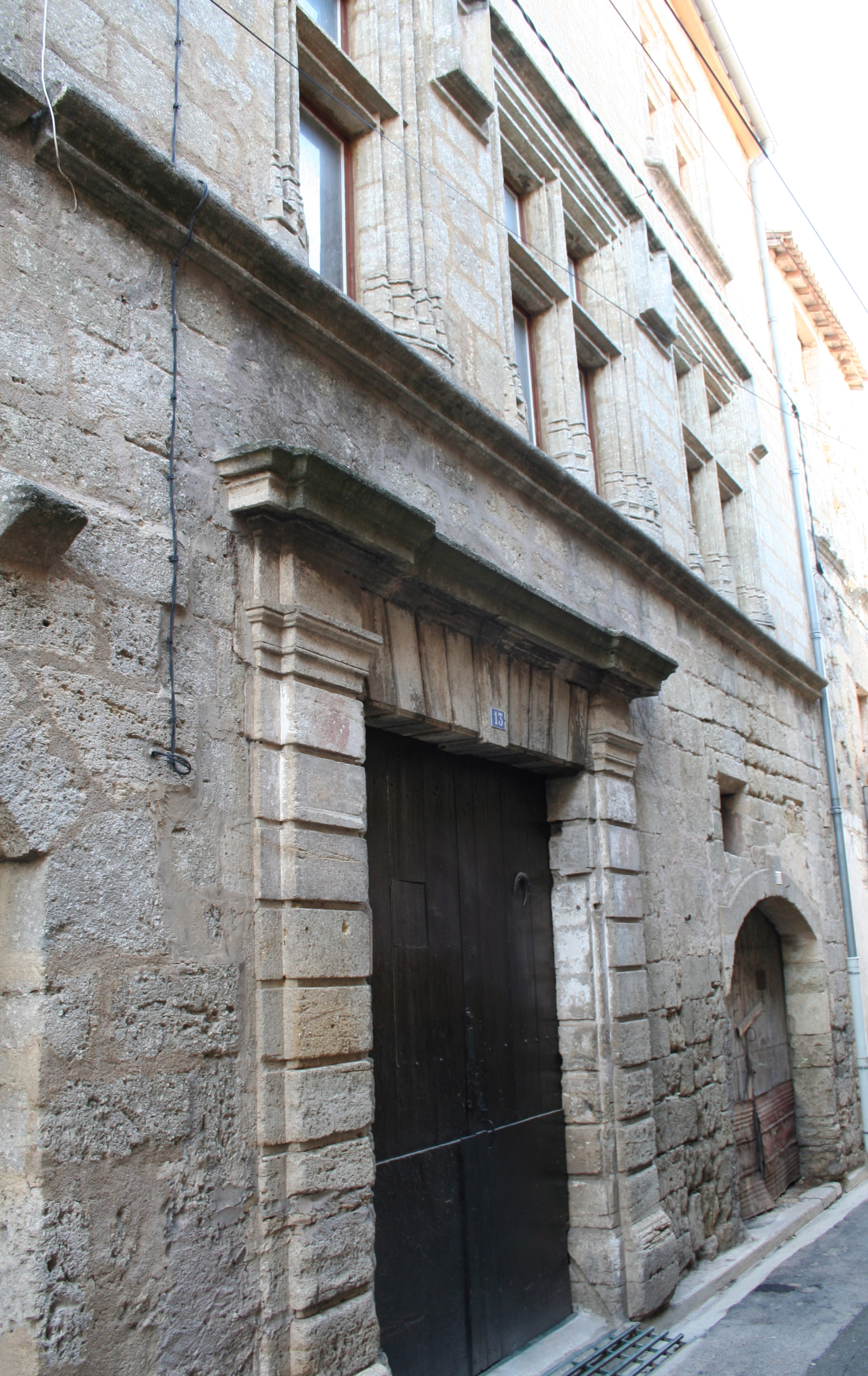
Hôtel de Pegat

== See also ==
- Communes of the Hérault department
