= Royal Waltz =

1936 film

- Directed by: Jean Grémillon
- Written by: Emil Burri; Walter Forster; Henri Falk
- Produced by: Karl Ritter
- Starring: Henri Garat; Renée Saint-Cyr; Christian-Gérard
- Cinematography: Konstantin Irmen-Tschet
- Edited by: Klaus Stapenhorst
- Music by: Franz Doelle
- Production company: UFA
- Distributed by: ACE
- Release date: 3 January 1936
- Running time: 95 minutes
- Countries: France; Germany
- Language: French

Royal Waltz (French: Valse royale) is a 1936 French-German historical film directed by Jean Grémillon and starring Henri Garat, Renée Saint-Cyr and Christian-Gérard.

It is the French-language version of the German film Königswalzer, made in Berlin by UFA. The film's art direction was by Robert Herlth and Walter Röhrig. Raoul Ploquin, who specialised in co-productions acted as supervisor.

== Synopsis ==
In Munich in 1852 Michel de Thalberg, the Austrian envoy to arrange a dynastic marriage with Bavaria falls in love but finds his plans thwarted until he is assisted by the intervention of Princess Elisabeth.

== Cast ==
- Henri Garat as Michel de Thalberg
- Renée Saint-Cyr as Thérèse Tomasoni
- Christian-Gérard as Pilou
- Adrien Le Gallo as Le roi Max de Bavière
- Mila Parély as Annie Tomasini
- Bernard Lancret as L'empereur François Joseph d'Autriche
- Alla Donell as La princesse Elisabeth de Bavière, nommée Sissi
- Gustave Gallet as Ludwig Tomasoni
- Lucien Dayle as Gargamus
- Geymond Vital as René
- Edmond Beauchamp as Maps
- Georges Prieur as Le comte Thalberg
- Jean Aymé as de Borney
- Gaston Dubosc
- Georgette Lamoureux

== Bibliography ==
- Crisp, Colin. Genre, Myth and Convention in the French Cinema, 1929-1939. Indiana University Press, 2002.
