= Pierre Valde =

French stage actor and theatre director

- Born: Pierre Duchemin; 25 November 1907; Brioude
- Died: 26 February 1977 (aged 69); Paris
- Occupations: Actor, Theatre director

Pierre Valde, real name Pierre Duchemin, (25 November 1907 – 26 February 1977) was a French stage actor and theatre director. He was a dramaturge at the Théâtre de l'Atelier managed by Charles Dullin from 1933 to 1937 and then established his own company, the Théâtre du Temps which was awarded the first prize of young companies for Œdipe by Georges Sonnier.

== Filmography ==
- 1969 : Les Enquêtes du commissaire Maigret by René Lucot, episode: Maigret in Exile, as the judge Forlacroix
- 1976 : Les Mystères de Loudun by Gérard Vergez, as Laubardemont
- 1977 : Histoire de la grandeur et de la décadence de César Birotteau
- 1977 : La Question by Laurent Heynemann, as the assassinated president
- 1977 : Bergeval père et fils, as Leversin
- 1977 : Spoiled Children by Bertrand Tavernier
- 1977 : Les Enquêtes du commissaire Maigret, épisode : L'Amie de Mme Maigret by Marcel Cravenne

== Theatre ==
=== Comedian ===
- 1943 : The Imaginary Invalid by Molière, mise en scène Pierre Valde, Théâtre du Temps
- 1947 : Les Amants de Noël by Pierre Barillet, mise en scène Pierre Valde, Théâtre de Poche Montparnasse
- 1948 : La Dame de l'aube by Alejandro Casona, mise en scène Pierre Valde, Théâtre de la Gaîté-Montparnasse
- 1950 : Le Cid by Corneille, mise en scène Jean Vilar, Festival d'Avignon
- 1952 : Jésus la Caille, adapted from the novel Jésus-la-Caille by Francis Carco, mise en scène Pierre Valde, Théâtre des Célestins, Théâtre Gramont, Théâtre Antoine
- 1958 : The Anniversary by John Whiting, mise en scène Pierre Valde, Théâtre du Vieux-Colombier
- 1959 : La Cathédrale by René Aubert, mise en scène Pierre Valde, Théâtre Hébertot
- 1959 : Les Petits Bourgeois by Maxim Gorky, mise en scène Grégory Chmara, Théâtre de l'Œuvre
- 1966 : An Enemy of the People by Henrik Ibsen, mise en scène Pierre Valde, Théâtre de Colombes
- 1967 : Vassa Geleznova by Maxim Gorky, mise en scène Pierre Valde, Théâtre de Colombes
- 1967 : L'Unique Jour de l'année by Alan Seymour, mise en scène Pierre Valde, Théâtre de Colombes
- 1967 : Le Cid by Corneille, mise en scène Pierre Valde, Théâtre de Colombes
- 1968 : The Imaginary Invalid by Molière, mise en scène Pierre Valde, Théâtre de Colombes
- 1968 : L'étoile devient rouge by Seán O'Casey, mise en scène Pierre Valde, Théâtre de Colombes
- 1969 : A Marriage Proposal by Anton Chekov, mise en scène Christian Dente, Théâtre de Colombes
- 1969 : Peace by Pierre Valde and Yves Carlevaris after Aristophanes, mise en scène Pierre Valde, Théâtre de Colombes
- 1969 : Le Barbier de Séville by Beaumarchais, mise en scène Pierre Valde, Théâtre de Colombes
- 1969 : Le Médecin malgré lui by Molière, mise en scène Pierre Valde, Théâtre de Colombes

=== Theatre director ===
- 1943 : The Imaginary Invalid by Molière
- 1944 : Hyménée by Nikolai Gogol, Théâtre du Vieux-Colombier
- 1946 : Œdipe by Georges Sonnier
- 1946 : La Pomme rouge by René Aubert, Théâtre de Poche Montparnasse
- 1947 : Les Amants de Noël by Pierre Barillet, Théâtre de Poche
- 1947 : Les Enfants du Bon Dieu by Jean-Marie Dunoyer, Théâtre de Poche
- 1947 : Le Testament du Père Leleu by Roger Martin du Gard, Théâtre de Poche
- 1948 : La Dame de l'aube by Alejandro Casona, Théâtre de la Gaîté-Montparnasse
- 1948 : Dirty Hands by Jean-Paul Sartre, Théâtre Antoine
- 1949 : An Inspector Calls by John Boynton Priestley, Studio des Champs-Élysées
- 1950 : La Grande Pauline et les Petits Chinois by René Aubert, Théâtre de l'Étoile
- 1951 : Les Radis creux by Jean Meckert, Théâtre de Poche Montparnasse
- 1952 : Jésus la Caille by Francis Carco, Théâtre des Célestins, Théâtre Gramont, Théâtre Antoine
- 1953 : Crime on Goat-Island by Ugo Betti, Théâtre des Noctambules
- 1953 : The Rose Tattoo by Tennessee Williams, Théâtre Gramont
- 1953 : Anadyomène by Georges Clément, Théâtre de l'Apollo
- 1954 : Affaire vous concernant by Jean-Pierre Conty, Théâtre de Paris
- 1954 : La Maison carrée by Évelyne Pollet, Théâtre des Noctambules
- 1955 : Poppi by Georges Sonnier, Théâtre des Arts
- 1955 : The Witness for the Prosecution by Agatha Christie, Théâtre Édouard VII
- 1955 : Judas by Marcel Pagnol, Théâtre de Paris
- 1956 : L’Orgueil et la nuée by Georges Soria, Théâtre des Noctambules
- 1957 : Bettina by Alfred Fabre-Luce, Théâtre de l'Œuvre
- 1957 : Cléo de Paris, Théâtre de l'Œuvre
- 1958 : The anniversary by John Whiting, Théâtre du Vieux-Colombier
- 1958 : L'Enfant du dimanche by Pierre Brasseur, Théâtre Édouard VII
- 1959 : La Cathédrale by René Aubert, Théâtre Hébertot
- 1960 : L'Enfant de la route by Isabelle Georges Schreiber, Théâtre de l'Œuvre
- 1960 : Ana d'Eboli by Pierre Ordioni, Théâtre Charles de Rochefort
- 1960 : La Logeuse by Jacques Audiberti, Théâtre de l'Œuvre
- 1961 : Amal et la lettre du roi by Rabindranath Tagore, Théâtre de l'Œuvre
- 1963 : L'assassin est dans la salle by Pierre Nimus, Théâtre des Arts
- 1963 : A Month in the Country by Ivan Turgenev, Théâtre du Capitole de Toulouse
- 1964 : La Peau du carnassier by Victor Haïm, Comédie de Paris
- 1966 : The Rose Tattoo by Tennessee Williams, Théâtre municipal de Lausanne
- 1966 : An Enemy of the People by Henrik Ibsen, Théâtre de Colombes
- 1966 : Mourir en chantant by Victor Haïm, Théâtre de Colombes
- 1967 : La Dévotion à la croix after Pedro Calderón de la Barca, adaptation Albert Camus, Grand Théâtre de Limoges
- 1967 : The Miser by Molière, Théâtre de Colombes
- 1967 : Mort d'une baleine by Jacques Jacquine, Comédie de Paris
- 1967 : L'Unique Jour de l'année by Alan Seymour, Théâtre de Colombes
- 1967 : Le Cid by Corneille, Théâtre de Colombes
- 1967 : Vassa Geleznova by Maxim Gorky, Théâtre de Colombes
- 1968 : The Imaginary Invalid by Molière, Théâtre de Colombes
- 1968 : The Star Turns Red by Seán O'Casey, Théâtre de Colombes
- 1968 : Tartuffe by Molière, Théâtre de Colombes
- 1969 : Peace by Pierre Valde and Yves Carlevaris after Aristophanes, Théâtre de Colombes
- 1969 : Le Mariage de Barillon by Georges Feydeau
- 1969 : Le Barbier de Séville by Beaumarchais, Théâtre de Colombes
- 1969 : Le Médecin malgré lui by Molière, Théâtre de Colombes
- 1970 : Britannicus by Racine, Théâtre de Colombes
