= Forbidden to the Public =

- Directed by: Alfred Pasquali
- Written by: Roger Dornès; Jean Marsan
- Produced by: Paul Devriès; Paul Wagner; Jacques Willemetz
- Starring: Jacques Erwin; Mary Marquet; Jacqueline Gauthier
- Cinematography: Marcel Grignon
- Edited by: Victor Grizelin; Yvonne Perrin
- Music by: Marceau Van Hoorebecke
- Production companies: Les Film Jacques Willemetz; Les Prisonniers Associés
- Release date: 2 December 1949
- Running time: 86 minutes
- Country: France
- Language: French

Forbidden to the Public (French: Interdit au public) is a 1949 French comedy film directed by Alfred Pasquali and starring Jacques Erwin, Mary Marquet and Jacqueline Gauthier.

== Cast ==
- Jacques Erwin as Hervé Montagne
- Mary Marquet as Gabrielle Tristan
- José Noguero as Pepito Pajo
- Michel Roux as Pierre
- Jacqueline Gauthier as Gisèle
- Mona Goya as Nicole
- Alfred Pasquali as Saturnin
- Serge Nadaud as Korninoff
- Jeanne Longuet as the secretary
- Hubert Noël as Bernard
- Maxime Fabert as Robert
- Camille Fournier as Lucienne
- Jean Marsan as the actor
- Monique Gérard as an actress
- Tania Soucault as an actress
- Christiane Auger as an actress
- Simone Duhart as an actress

== Bibliography ==
- Rège, Philippe. Encyclopedia of French Film Directors, Volume 1. Scarecrow Press, 2009.
