= Jean Henri Latude =

French writer (1725–1805)

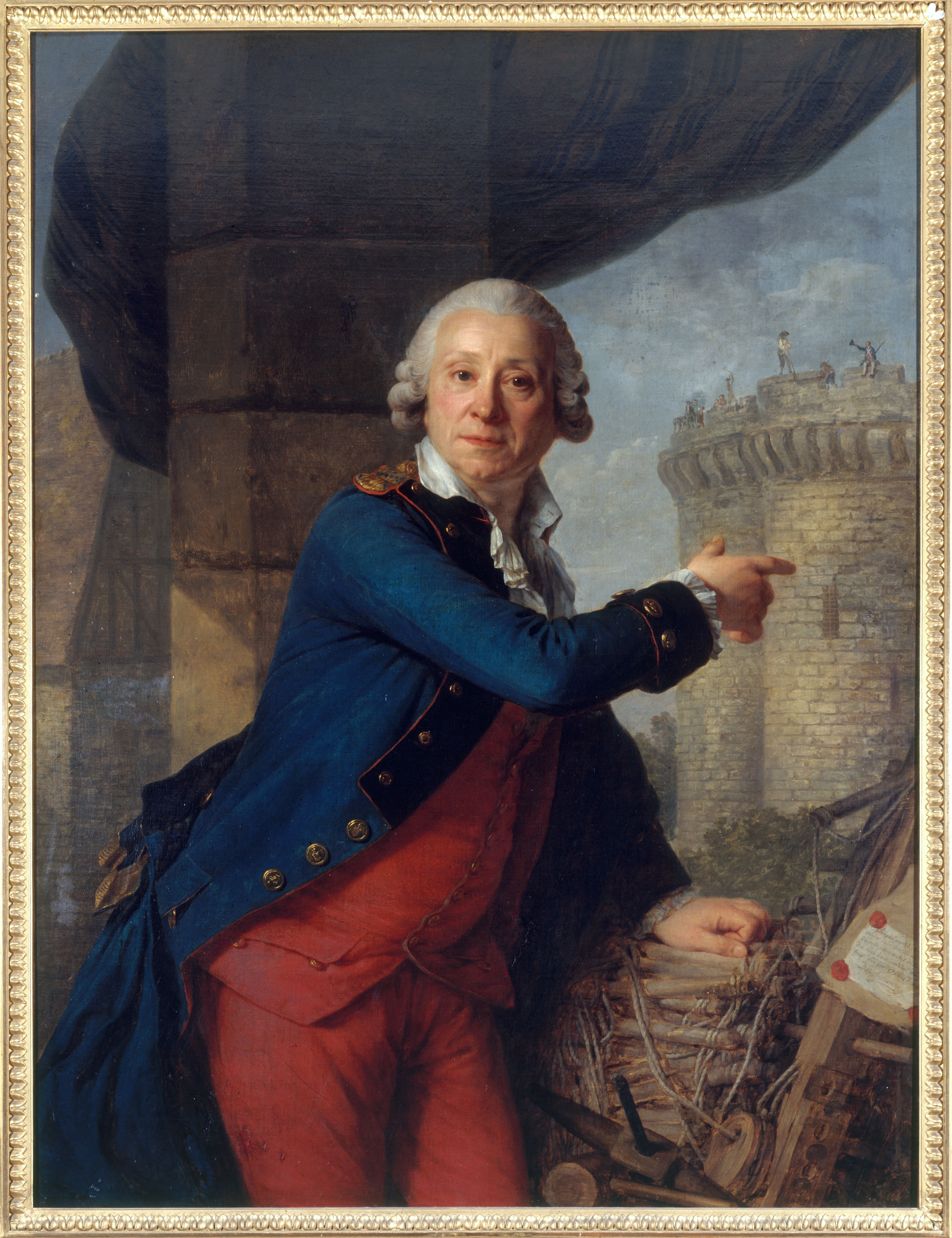
Jean Henri Latude by Antoine Vestier

Jean Henri Latude (23 March 1725 – 1 January 1805), often called Danry or Masers de Latude, was a French writer famous for his lengthy confinement in the Bastille and Vincennes, and for his repeated escapes from those prisons.

== Life ==
He was born at Montagnac in Gascony. He received a military education and went to Paris in 1748 to study mathematics. He led a dissipated life and endeavoured to curry favor with Madame de Pompadour by secretly sending her a box of poison and then informing her of the supposed plot against her life, hoping that he could earn a reward of cash for warning her. The ruse was discovered, and Mme de Pompadour, not appreciating the humor of the situation, had Latude put in the Bastille on May 1, 1749.

He was later transferred to Vincennes, from which he escaped on June 25, 1750. He then stayed in Paris where he wrote a letter asking for clemency which he gave to François Quesnay for delivery to Louis XV. Latude included his address in the letter leading to his arrest and reimprisonment in the Bastille. He made a second escape on February 25, 1756 by fashioning a ladder, depicted in his portrait by Antoine Vestier, from firewood for rungs and rope made from shirts and bed sheets which he, along with an accomplice, used to scale down the walls of the Bastille. Latude and his accomplice then used iron bars, taken from their fire place, to carve out stones in the outer wall for nine hours while standing in chest high icy water ducking underwater when the sentry passed on the wall above them. After breaching the wall the fugitives fell into an aqueduct outside the walls and almost drowned. Latude then traveled to Amsterdam arriving on April 20, 1756. He was then arrested and reinterned in the Bastille on June 9th, 1756 where he was placed in the dungeon with his hands and feet shackled. While in the dungeon he composed military and financial projects and when he was deprived of paper he composed them on sheets of bread crumbs congealed with his own saliva. He was again transferred to Vincennes in 1764, and the next year made a third escape and was a third time recaptured. He was put into the Charenton asylum by Malesherbes in 1775, and discharged in 1777 on condition that he should retire to his native town.

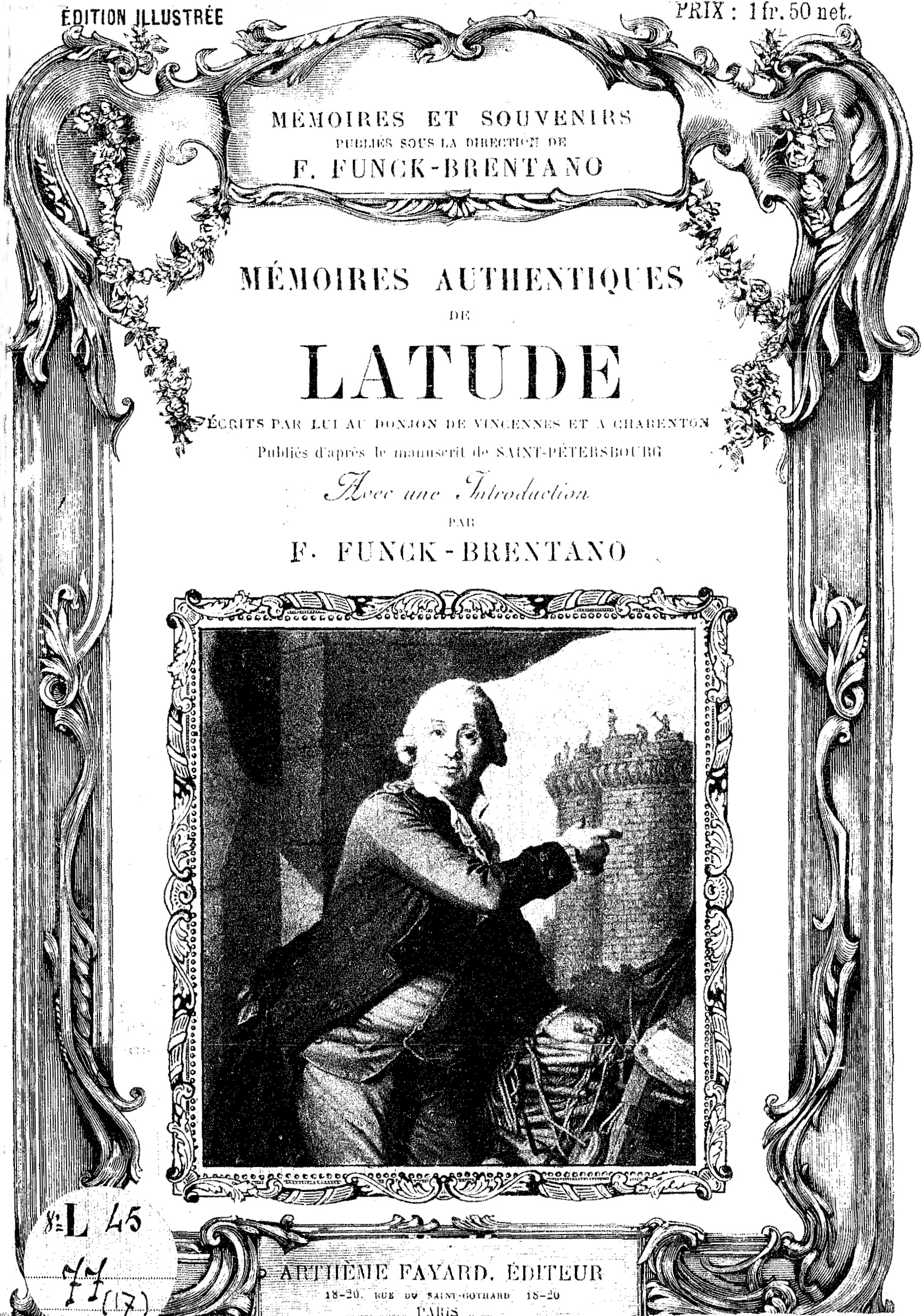
Cover of Mémoires authentiques de Latude

He remained in Paris, however, and he was again imprisoned. A certain Madame Legros became interested in him through a chance reading of one of his memoirs, and, through vigorous agitation on his behalf, secured his release in 1784. His considerable ability for mimicry and intrigue were evidenced throughout his long captivity; he posed as a brave military officer, a son of the non-existent marquis de La Tude, and as a victim of Pompadour's nefarious intrigues. He was lauded and pensioned during the Revolution, and, in 1793, the Convention compelled the heirs of Madame de Pompadour to pay him 60,000 francs in damages. He died wealthy but in obscurity in Paris in 1805.

== Work ==
The principal work of Latude is the account of his imprisonment, written in collaboration with Jean-Yrieix de Beaupoil de Saint-Aulaire entitled Le Despotisme dévoilé, ou Mémoires de Henri Masers de la Tude, détenu pendant trente-cinq ans dans les diverses prisons d'état (ostensibly Amsterdam, but actually published in Paris, 1787). An English translation of a portion of this work (Despotism Unveiled: or the Memoirs of Latude, Detained for Thirty-five Years in the Various Prisons of the State) was published in 1787. Latude himself denied both the authorship and the accuracy of the pamphlet, but it enjoyed a considerable popularity at the time of the French Revolution. Latude also wrote essays on a wide variety of subjects.

- Works by Latude at Project Gutenberg

== Britannica references ==
- Claude Quetel, Escape from the Bastille: The Life and Legend of Latude (Palgrave Macmillan, 1990) ISBN 0-312-04659-6
- J. F. Barrire, Mémoires de Linguet et de Latude (1884)
- G. Bertin, Notice in edition of the Mémoires (1889)
- F. Funck-Brentano, "Latude", in the Revue des deux mondes (1 October 1889)
