= Théâtre Gramont =

Theatre venue in Paris, France

Coordinates: 48.8712°N 2.3371°E

The théâtre Gramont was a theatre venue located at 30 rue de Gramont in the 2nd arrondissement of Paris.

René Dupuy was the managing director from 1954 to 1973. The place was transformed into a movie theatre (Le Gramont) in April 1974 then changed its name to Opéra Night in 1979 after one of its two scenes became a disco before the whole place definitively closed down in July 1987.

== Répertoire ==
- 1945 : Au petit bonheur by Marc-Gilbert Sauvajon, directed by Alfred Pasquali, with Jean Marchat, Sophie Desmarets, Gérard Philipe
- 1945 : La Fugue de Caroline by Alfred Adam, directed by Pierre Dux
- 1946 : Le Revolver de Venise by Pierre Grève and Victor Camarat, directed by Jean Vernier
- 1946 : Our Town by Thornton Wilder, directed by Claude Maritz
- 1946 : Plainte contre inconnu by Georges Neveux, directed by Jean Mercure
- 1947 : Monsieur Providence by Albert Husson
- 1948 : La Ligne de chance by Albert Husson
- 1949 : Les Bonnes Cartes by Marcel Thiébaut, directed by Pierre Bertin
- 1950 : Mon ami le cambrioleur by André Haguet, directed by Michèle Verly
- 1951 : Mort d'un rat by Jan de Hartog, directed by Jean Mercure
- 1952 : Jésus la Caille, adapted from the novel Jésus-la-Caille by Francis Carco, directed by Pierre Valde
- 1952 : Many by Alfred Adam, directed by Pierre Dux
- 1953 : The Rose Tattoo by Tennessee Williams, directed by Pierre Valde
- 1954 : N'importe quoi pour elle by Steve Passeur, directed by Georges Douking
- 1954 : Le Héros et le Soldat by George Bernard Shaw, directed by René Dupuy
- 1955 : Le Quai Conti by Guillaume Hanoteau, directed by René Dupuy
- 1956 : À la monnaie du Pape by Louis Velle, directed by René Dupuy
- 1956 : Irma la douce, musical by Alexandre Breffort and Marguerite Monnot, directed by René Dupuy
- 1956 : The Playboy of the Western World by John Millington Synge, directed by René Dupuy
- 1958 : Édition de midi by Mihail Sebastian, directed by René Dupuy
- 1959 : La Double Vie de Théophraste Longuet by Jean Rougeul after Gaston Leroux, directed by René Dupuy
- 1961 : Un certain monsieur Blot by Robert Rocca after Pierre Daninos, directed by René Dupuy
- 1962 : Le Timide au palais by Tirso de Molina, directed by René Dupuy
- 1963 : You never can tell by George Bernard Shaw, directed by René Dupuy
- 1964 : Les Jouets by Georges Michel, mise en scène Arlette Reinerg
- 1964 : The Misunderstanding by Albert Camus, directed by Michel Vitold
- 1965 : No Exit by Jean-Paul Sartre, directed by Michel Vitold
- 1965 : Pantagleize by Michel de Ghelderode, directed by René Dupuy
- 1965 : Du vent dans les branches de sassafras by René de Obaldia, directed by René Dupuy
- 1965 : The Chairs by Eugène Ionesco, directed by Jacques Mauclair
- 1965 : Enquête à l'italienne by Jacques de La Forterie, directed by Daniel Crouet
- 1967 : The Chairs by Eugène Ionesco, directed by Jacques Mauclair
- 1967 : Je m’appelle Harry Dave by Romain Bouteille
- 1967 : Rapport pour une académie by Franz Kafka, directed by René Dupuy
- 1968 : Le Shaga and Yes, peut-être by Marguerite Duras, directed by the author
- 1968 : Service de nuit by Muriel Box and Sidney Box, directed by Jacques Mauclair
- 1968 : Je ne veux pas mourir idiot by Georges Wolinski
- 1969 : Je ne pense qu'à ça by Georges Wolinski and Claude Confortes
- 1969 : Le Garrot by Josef Sandor, directed by Marc Cassot
- 1969 : Popaul et Juliette by André Maheux and Mireille Hartuch, directed by René Dupuy
- 1970 : Full Up by Guy Foissy, directed by Claudine Vattier
- 1970 : Pourquoi t'as fait ça ? by Philippe Avron and Claude Evrard
- 1973 : Un yaourt pour deux by Stanley Price, directed by Michel Roux
