= Jean-Pierre Conty =

French writer (1917–1984)

Jean Pierre Conty
- Born: Jean Pierre Walrafen; 9 December 1917; Merlebach (Moselle)
- Died: 9 September 1984 (aged 66)
- Occupation: Writer

Jean Pierre Conty, real name Jean Pierre Walrafen, (9 December 1917 – 12 September 1984) was a 20th-century French writer, famous for his spying novels.

The hero of most of his novel is Mr. Suzuki, a Japanese spy. He has also published under the pen name Jean Crau .

== Works ==
=== Theatre ===
In 1954, his play Affaire vous concernant is directed by Pierre Valde at the Théâtre de Paris. In 1965, he coauthored with Jean Bernard-Luc, a comédie-vaudeville which has now become a classic of the genre : Quand épousez-vous ma femme ?, staged on theatre with Michel Serrault, Jean-Pierre Darras and Maria Pacôme.

=== Comic strips ===
Several adaptations in comic strips of the series Mr. Suzuki have been made by Jacomo:

- 1974 : La nuit rouge de Mr. Suzuki, Artima
- 1975 : Mr. Suzuki a la dent dure, Artima
- 1975 : Mr. Suzuki et la ville fantôme, Artima
- 1977 : Mr. Suzuki lance un sos, Artima
- 1977 : Mr. Suzuki lance un sos (2), Artima

=== Cinema ===
Robert Vernay has directed the cinematographic adaptation of Monsieur Suzuki prend la mouche in 1960 under the title: Monsieur Suzuki with Jean Thielment, Ivan Desny, Pierre Dudan and Claude Farell.

== Prizes and awards ==
In 1953, he was awarded the Grand Prix de Littérature Policière for his novel Opération Odyssée.
