= Firmin Gémier =

French actor and director

Firmin Gémier (French pronunciation: [fiʁmɛ̃ ʒemje]; 1869–1933) was a French actor and director. Internationally, he is most famous for originating the role of Père Ubu in Alfred Jarry's play Ubu Roi. He is known as the principal architect of the popular theatre movement in France.

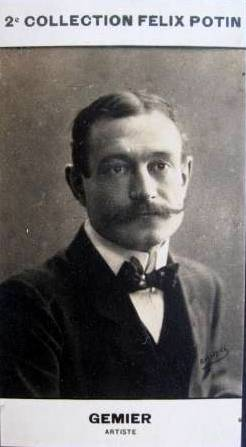
CFP-2 Gémier, Firmin (2)

== Early life ==
Gémier was born in 1869 in Aubervilliers, France, with the given name Firmin Tonnerre.^{:514} He was raised an orphan.^{:88} After leaving school, he studied in a chemist's laboratory, but 'was discharged' for mimicking his employer.

== Career ==
Gémier began his career as an actor in melodramas for working class actors, before going on to direct six different theaters, including the Théâtre Antoine and the Odéon.^{:88}

=== As actor ===
He performed more than 300 roles as an actor, in styles that ranged from Naturalism to Symbolism to more populist work.^{:88-90} In 1892 he joined André Antoine's Théâtre Libre, where he first gained a national profile. In 1896 he played his most famous role, Père Ubu in the premiere of Alfred Jarry's Ubu Roi (1896) at Lugné-Poe's Théâtre de l’Œuvre.^{:514}

=== As director ===
Gémier was also a prolific director, staging over 300 productions during the course of his career.^{:88} He began a freelance directing career in 1900, before taking over the direction of the Théâtre Antoine from 1906 to 1921.^{:514} He was 'a tireless champion of the idea of a theatre for the people'.^{:20} His goal as director was to create a theatre that was 'both popular and national, not sectarian but unifying'.^{:217}

In 1911, he initiated the privately funded Théâtre National Ambulant (TNA).^{:514} The TNA was a popular theater project that brought theatre to the 'outermost provinces in France'.^{:91} The theatre used eight steam-engine tractors that

pulled a caravan of thirty-seven trailers that carried the sets, costumes, lighting equipment, electric generator, seating for 1650 people, portable stage proscenium arch, and the double walled tent–supported by five seventeen-meter steel towers–that housed the stage and auditorium.^{:514}

Though it lasted only two seasons, it was an important part of the French popular theatre movement.^{:91}

In 1920 he was made the director of the newly created, and government funded, Théâtre National Populaire.^{:4} In 1927, he founded the Société universelle du théâtre with the support of the League of Nations.^{:4} It stopped functioning in 1939 at the outbreak of World War II, but has been cited as a predecessor to UNESCO's International Theatre Institute.^{:4}

== Personal life ==
He was married to French actress Andrée Megard.^{:499}

== Theaters he directed ==
- Théâtre de la Rénaissance (1901–1902)
- Théâtre Antoine (1906-1921)
- Théâtre National Ambulant (1911–1912)
- Comédie Montaigne (1919–1920)
- Théâtre National Populaire (1920-1921)
- Odéon (1922-1930)^{:88}
