= Théâtre Verlaine =

Coordinates: 48°52′52.68″N 2°20′48.12″E

The Théâtre Verlaine was a theater located at 66 rue de Rochechouart in the 9th arrondissement of Paris. It opened in 1946 with 750 seats. In 1953 it was renamed the Théâtre des Arts and remained open until 1969 under the direction of Alexandra Rouba-Jansky.
