= Jean Marsan =

French screenwriter and actor (1920–1977)

- Born: 7 April 1920; France
- Died: 29 September 1977 (aged 57); France
- Occupation: Actor
- Years active: 1948–1977

Jean Marsan (7 April 1920 – 29 September 1977) was a French screenwriter and actor. He was co-nominated for the Academy Award for Best Story for the film The Sheep Has Five Legs (1954).

== Selected filmography ==
- The Secret of Monte Cristo (1948)
- Forbidden to the Public (1949)
- The Girl from Maxim's (1950)
- Women of Paris (1953)
- Fruits of Summer (1955)
- Bonjour sourire (1956)
- The Seventh Commandment (1957)
- All the Gold in the World (1961)
- Coplan Takes Risks (1964)
