= Jean Le Poulain =

French stage actor and stage director

- Born: 12 September 1924; Marseille, France
- Died: 1 March 1988 (aged 63); Paris, France
- Occupation: Stage actor

Jean Le Poulain (12 September 1924 – 1 March 1988) was a French stage actor and stage director.

He attended the cours Simon in Paris and won the first prize of Comedy at the Conservatoire national supérieur d'art dramatique in 1949. He was then recruited by Jean Vilar at the Théâtre national populaire and in 1952 he appeared with Gérard Philipe in The Prince of Homburg by Heinrich von Kleist at the théâtre des Champs-Élysées. He began as an actor both in theatre and cinema in 1947 and often appeared on the regular theatre show of the French television Au théâtre ce soir created in 1966. He joined the Comédie-Française in 1978, where he became sociétaire in 1980, then General administrator from September 1986 until his death. Here he portrayed Monsieur Jourdain in Le Bourgeois gentilhomme by Molière.

== Theatre ==
=== Actor ===
- 1947: Un amour comme le nôtre by Guy Verdot, Théâtre de Poche Montparnasse
- 1949: L'Habit vert by Gaston Arman de Caillavet and Robert de Flers, directed by Pierre Aldebert, Théâtre national de Chaillot
- 1949: Le Glorieux by Philippe Néricault Destouches, Théâtre de Chaillot
- 1950: Barabbas dit de la grotte by Michel de Ghelderode, directed by Jean Le Poulain and Roger Harth, Théâtre de l'Œuvre
- 1950: L'Amour truqué by Paul Nivoix, directed by Jacques Charon, Théâtre de la Potinière
- 1951: Halte au destin by Jacques Chabannes, directed by Georges Douking, Théâtre de la Potinière
- 1951: Mother Courage and Her Children by Bertolt Brecht, directed by Jean Vilar, Théâtre de la Cité Jardins Suresnes
- 1951: Le Cid by Corneille, directed by Jean Vilar, Théâtre de la Cité Jardins Suresnes
- 1952: A Flea in Her Ear by Feydeau, directed by Georges Vitaly, Théâtre Montparnasse
- 1952: L'Histoire du Docteur Faust by Christopher Marlowe, directed by Jean Le Poulain, Théâtre de l'Œuvre
- 1952: Robinson by Jules Supervielle, directed by Jean Le Poulain, Théâtre de l'Œuvre
- 1953: Ces messieurs de la Santé by Paul Armont and Léopold Marchand, Théâtre de Paris
- 1953: O, mes aïeux !... by José-André Lacour, directed by Jean Le Poulain, Théâtre de l'Œuvre
- 1954: A Flea in Her Ear by Georges Feydeau, directed by Georges Vitaly, Théâtre des Célestins
- 1954: Si jamais je te pince !... by Eugène Labiche, directed by Georges Vitaly, Théâtre La Bruyère
- 1955: Nekrassov by Jean-Paul Sartre, directed by Jean Meyer, Théâtre Antoine
- 1955: Anastasia by Marcelle Maurette, directed by Jean Le Poulain, Théâtre Antoine
- 1956: Le mari ne compte pas by Roger-Ferdinand, directed by Jacques Morel, Théâtre Édouard VII
- 1957: Wako, l'abominable homme des neiges by Roger Duchemin, directed by Jean Le Poulain, Théâtre Hébertot
- 1957: L'École des cocottes by Paul Armont & Marcel Gerbidon, directed by Jacques Charon, Théâtre Hébertot
- 1958: Les Pieds au mur by Jean Guitton, directed by Jean de Létraz, Théâtre du Palais-Royal
- 1958: La Hobereaute by Jacques Audiberti, directed by Jean Le Poulain, Théâtre du Vieux-Colombier
- 1959: La Punaise by Vladimir Maïakovski, directed by André Barsacq, Théâtre de l'Atelier
- 1959: Cyrano de Bergerac by Edmond Rostand, directed by Jean Le Poulain, Théâtre des Célestins, Festival of Bellac
- 1959: The Trojan War Will Not Take Place by Jean Giraudoux, directed by Jean Marchat, Festival de Bellac
- 1959: Hamlet by William Shakespeare, directed by Jean Darnel, Arènes de Saintes
- 1959: Dix Ans ou dix minutes by Grisha Dabat, directed by Jean Le Poulain, Théâtre Hébertot
- 1960: L'Otage by Paul Claudel, directed by Roger Dornes, Festival de Bellac
- 1960: De doux dingues by Joseph Carole, directed by Jean Le Poulain, Théâtre Édouard VII
- 1960: Le Tartuffe by Molière, directed by Jean Le Poulain, Festival de Bellac
- 1960: Le Tartuffe by Molière, directed by Roland Piétri, Comédie des Champs-Élysées
- 1960: Le Songe du critique by Jean Anouilh, directed by the author, Comédie des Champs-Élysées
- 1961: Twelfth Night by William Shakespeare, directed by Jean Le Poulain, Théâtre du Vieux-Colombier
- 1961: La Grotte by Jean Anouilh, directed by the author and Roland Piétri, Théâtre Montparnasse
- 1962: L'Otage by Paul Claudel, directed by Bernard Jenny, Théâtre du Vieux-Colombier
- 1962: Le Pain dur by Paul Claudel, directed by Bernard Jenny, Théâtre du Vieux-Colombier
- 1962: Le Père humilié by Paul Claudel, directed by Bernard Jenny, Théâtre du Vieux-Colombier
- 1964: Le Minotaure by Marcel Aymé, directed by Jean Le Poulain, Théâtre des Bouffes-Parisiens
- 1964: Les Escargots meurent debout by Francis Blanche, directed by Jean Le Poulain, Théâtre Fontaine
- 1964: Moumou by Jean de Letraz, directed by Jean Le Poulain, Théâtre des Bouffes-Parisiens
- 1965: Les Filles by Jean Marsan, directed by Jean Le Poulain, Théâtre Édouard VII, Théâtre de la Porte-Saint-Martin
- 1965: Pourquoi pas Vamos by Georges Conchon, directed by Jean Mercure, Théâtre Édouard VII
- 1965: La Dame de chez Maxim by Georges Feydeau, directed by Jacques Charon, Théâtre du Palais-Royal
- 1967: Jean de la Lune by Marcel Achard, directed by Jean Piat, Théâtre du Palais-Royal
- 1967: Forbidden to the Public by Jean Marsan, directed by Jean Le Poulain, Théâtre Saint-Georges
- 1969: Le Bourgeois gentilhomme by Molière, directed by Jean Le Poulain, Festival d'Arles
- 1969: Interdit au public by Jean Marsan, directed by Jean Le Poulain, Théâtre des Célestins
- 1969: La Périchole by Jacques Offenbach, directed by Maurice Lehmann, Théâtre de Paris
- 1969: Le Contrat by Francis Veber, directed by Pierre Mondy, Théâtre du Gymnase
- 1970: Twelfth Night by William Shakespeare, directed by Jean Meyer, Théâtre antique de Fourvière
- 1972: Barbe-Bleue opéra-bouffe by Jacques Offenbach, livret Henri Meilhac and Ludovic Halévy, directed by Maurice Lehmann, Théâtre de Paris
- 1972: Le Noir te va si bien by Jean Marsan, directed by Jean Le Poulain, Théâtre Antoine
- 1972: Le Saut du lit by Ray Cooney and John Chapman, Théâtre Montparnasse
- 1973: Le Bourgeois gentilhomme by Molière, directed by Jean Le Poulain, Théâtre Mogador
- 1974: Le Bourgeois gentilhomme by Molière, directed by Jean Le Poulain, Mai de Versailles
- 1975: La Grosse by Charles Laurence, directed by Jean Le Poulain, Théâtre des Bouffes-Parisiens
- 1976: Volpone by Jules Romains and Stefan Zweig after Ben Jonson, directed by Jean Meyer, Théâtre antique de Fourvière
- 1978: Miam miam ou le Dîner d'affaires by Jacques Deval, directed by Jean Le Poulain, Théâtre Marigny
- 1979: Dave au bord de mer by René Kalisky, directed by Antoine Vitez, Comédie-Française at the Théâtre de l'Odéon
- 1979: A Flea in Her Ear by Georges Feydeau, directed by Jean-Laurent Cochet, Comédie-Française
- 1980: Tartuffe by Molière, directed by Jean-Paul Roussillon, Comédie-Française
- 1980: Le Bourgeois gentilhomme by Molière, directed by Jean-Laurent Cochet, Comédie-Française
- 1981: La Dame de chez Maxim by Georges Feydeau, directed by Jean-Paul Roussillon, Comédie-Française
- 1982: Le Voyage de monsieur Perrichon by Eugène Labiche and Édouard Martin, directed by Jean Le Poulain, Comédie-Française
- 1982: Yvonne, princesse de Bourgogne by Witold Gombrowicz, directed by Jacques Rosner, Comédie-Française au Théâtre de l'Odéon
- 1983: L'École des femmes by Molière, directed by Jacques Rosner, Comédie-Française
- 1987: One for the Road by Harold Pinter, directed by Bernard Murat, Comédie-Française au Festival d'Avignon

=== Director ===
- 1950: Barabbas by Michel de Ghelderode, directed with Roger Harth, Théâtre de l'Œuvre
- 1952: L'Histoire du Docteur Faust by Christopher Marlowe, Théâtre de l'Œuvre
- 1952: Robinson by Jules Supervielle, Théâtre de l'Œuvre
- 1953: O, mes aïeux !... by José-André Lacour, Théâtre de l'Œuvre
- 1953: Eté et fumées by Tennessee Williams, Théâtre de l'Œuvre
- 1953: Le Piège à l'innocent by Eduardo Sola Franco, Théâtre de l'Œuvre
- 1955: Anastasia by Marcelle Maurette, Théâtre Antoine
- 1955: Il y a longtemps que je t'aime by Jacques Deval, Théâtre Édouard VII
- 1956: La Tour de Nesle by Frédéric Gaillardet after Alexandre Dumas, Théâtre des Mathurins
- 1957: Caesar and Cleopatra by George Bernard Shaw, Théâtre Sarah Bernhardt
- 1957: Wako, l'abominable homme des neiges by Roger Duchemin, Théâtre Hébertot
- 1958: La Hobereaute by Jacques Audiberti, Théâtre du Vieux-Colombier
- 1958: Le Pain des jules by Ange Bastiani, Théâtre des Arts
- 1959: Dix Ans ou dix minutes by Grisha Dabat, Théâtre Hébertot
- 1959: Cyrano de Bergerac by Edmond Rostand, Théâtre des Célestins, Festival de Bellac
- 1960: L'Apollon de Bellac by Jean Giraudoux, Festival de Bellac
- 1960: Supplément au voyage de Cook by Jean Giraudoux, Festival de Bellac
- 1960: Le Tartuffe by Molière, Festival de Bellac
- 1960: De doux dingues by Joseph Carole, Théâtre Édouard VII
- 1961: Twelfth Night by William Shakespeare, Théâtre du Vieux-Colombier
- 1961: The Respectful Prostitute by Jean-Paul Sartre, Théâtre du Gymnase
- 1961: Huit Femmes by Robert Thomas, Théâtre Édouard VII, Théâtre des Bouffes-Parisiens en 1962
- 1961: Coralie et Compagnie by Maurice Hennequin and Albin Valabrègue, Théâtre Sarah Bernhardt
- 1962: La Grande Catherine by George Bernard Shaw, Comédie-Française
- 1962: L'Idée d'Élodie by Michel André, Théâtre Michel
- 1962: La Contessa ou la Volupté d'être by Maurice Druon, Théâtre de Paris
- 1963: C'est ça qui m'flanqu'le cafard by Arthur L. Kopit, Théâtre des Bouffes-Parisiens
- 1963: Léon ou La Bonne Formule by Claude Magnier, Théâtre de l'Ambigu-Comique
- 1964: Le Minotaure by Marcel Aymé, Théâtre des Bouffes-Parisiens
- 1964: Têtes de rechange by Jean-Victor Pellerin, Théâtre des Bouffes-Parisiens
- 1964: Moumou by Jean de Letraz, Théâtre des Bouffes-Parisiens
- 1964: Les Escargots meurent debout by Francis Blanche, Théâtre Fontaine
- 1964: Quand épousez-vous ma femme ? by Jean Bernard-Luc and Jean-Pierre Conty, Théâtre du Vaudeville
- 1965: Les Filles by Jean Marsan, Théâtre Édouard VII
- 1967: Interdit au public by Jean Marsan, Théâtre Saint-Georges
- 1969: Les Italiens à Paris by Charles Charras and André Gille after Évariste Gherardi, Comédie-Française
- 1969: Le Bourgeois gentilhomme by Molière, Festival d'Arles
- 1972: Huit Femmes by Robert Thomas, Théâtre de la Madeleine
- 1972: Le Noir te va si bien by Jean Marsan, Théâtre Antoine
- 1972: Le Saut du lit by Ray Cooney and John Chapman, Théâtre Montparnasse
- 1973: La Débauche by Marcel Achard, Théâtre de l'Œuvre
- 1973: Le Bourgeois gentilhomme by Molière, Théâtre Mogador
- 1975: La Grosse by Charles Laurence, Théâtre des Bouffes-Parisiens
- 1976: Voyez-vous ce que je vois ? by Ray Cooney and John Chapman, Théâtre de la Michodière
- 1978: Miam miam ou le Dîner d'affaires by Jacques Deval, Théâtre Marigny
- 1982: Le Voyage de monsieur Perrichon by Eugène Labiche and Édouard Martin, Comédie-Française
- 1988: Le Saut du lit by Ray Cooney and John Chapman, Théâtre des Variétés

== Filmography ==
=== Cinema ===
- 1948: Les Aventures des Pieds-Nickelés (by Marcel Aboulker)
- 1959: Le Bossu (by André Hunebelle) – M. de Peyrolles
- 1961: Le Sahara brûle (by Michel Gast)
- 1961: Les Livreurs (by Jean Girault) – le professeur Alexis Schmutz
- 1962: Le Signe du lion (by Éric Rohmer) – le clochard
- 1962: Arsène Lupin Versus Arsène Lupin (by Édouard Molinaro) – le préfet de police
- 1962: Le Gorille a mordu l'archevêque (by Maurice Labro) – Lahurit
- 1962: The Mysteries of Paris (by André Hunebelle) – Le maître d'école
- 1962: L'Empire de la nuit (by Pierre Grimblat)
- 1963: Le Roi du village (by Henri Gruel)
- 1964: The Gorillas (by Jean Girault) – le metteur en scène
- 1966: Le Dix-septième ciel (by Serge Korber)
- 1968: A Strange Kind of Colonel (by Jean Girault) – Le pasteur
- 1968: Salut Berthe (by Guy Lefranc) – le père de Berthe
- 1970: Elle boit pas, elle fume pas, elle drague pas, mais... elle cause ! (by Michel Audiard) – Gruson
- 1970: Et qu'ça saute (by Guy Lefranc) – Don Pedro
- 1970: Sortie de secours (by Roger Kahane)
- 1973: L'Histoire très bonne et très joyeuse de Colinot trousse-chemise (by Nina Companeez) – le frère Albaret
- 1974: Ursule et Grelu (by Serge Korber) – le docteur du paquebot
- 1975: L'Ibis rouge (by Jean-Pierre Mocky) – Margos
- 1975: Divine (by Dominique Delouche) – Bobovitch
- 1978: Je te tiens, tu me tiens par la barbichette (by Jean Yanne) – Drouillard
- 1981: Signé Furax (by Marc Simenon) – Klakmuf

=== Télévision ===
- 1975: Le Tour du monde en quatre-vingts jours – 2 90 minutes parts broadcast on Antenne 2, Monday 29 December and Tuesday 30 December 1975
- 1979: La Belle vie (by Jean Anouilh, TV director Lazare Iglesis) – Albert
- 1981: Staline est mort (by Yves Ciampi) – Beria
- 1983: Le Tartuffe (by Molière, TV director Marlène Bertin) – Tartuffe

=== Au théâtre ce soir ===
Comedian

- 1966: Interdit au public by Roger Dornès and Jean Marsan, directed by Jean Le Poulain, TV director Pierre Sabbagh, Théâtre Marigny
- 1968: Azaïs by Georges Berr and Louis Verneuil, directed by Jean Le Poulain, YV director Pierre Sabbagh, Théâtre Marigny
- 1969: Le Minotaure by Marcel Aymé, directed by Jean Le Poulain, TV director Pierre Sabbagh, Théâtre Marigny
- 1970: Le Bourgeois gentilhomme by Molière, directed by Jean Le Poulain, TV director Pierre Sabbagh, Théâtre Marigny
- 1971: Fric-frac by Édouard Bourdet, directed by Jean Le Poulain, TV director Pierre Sabbagh, Théâtre Marigny
- 1971: De doux dingues by Joseph Carole, directed by Jean Le Poulain, TV director Georges Folgoas, Théâtre Marigny
- 1973: Twelfth Night by William Shakespeare, directed by Jean Le Poulain, TV director Georges Folgoas, Théâtre Marigny
- 1975: Le noir te va si bien by Jean Marsan after Saül O'Hara, directed by Jean Le Poulain, TV director Pierre Sabbagh, Théâtre Édouard VII
- 1977: Le Faiseur by Honoré de Balzac, directed by Pierre Franck, TV director Pierre Sabbagh, Théâtre Marigny
- 1978: Les Deux Timides and Le Misanthrope et l'Auvergnat by Eugène Labiche and Marc Michel, directed by Jean Le Poulain, TV director Pierre Sabbagh, Théâtre Marigny
- 1978: Volpone by Jules Romains and Stefan Zweig after Ben Jonson, directed by Jean Meyer, TV directorPierre Sabbagh, Théâtre Marigny
- 1978: Miam miam ou le Dîner d'affaires by Jacques Deval, directed by Jean Le Poulain, TV director Pierre Sabbagh, Théâtre Marigny
- 1984: Le Malade imaginaire by Molière, directed by Jean Le Poulain, TV director Pierre Sabbagh, Théâtre Marigny

Theatre director openly

- 1972: Le Don d'Adèle by Pierre Barillet and Jean-Pierre Gredy, TV director Pierre Sabbagh Théâtre Marigny
- 1973: Pétrus by Marcel Achard, TV director Georges Folgoas, Théâtre Marigny

== Prizes and honours ==
- 1978 : prix du Brigadier for Le Faiseur by Honoré de Balzac, Théâtre des Variétés
