= L'Otage =

1911 play by Paul Claudel

L'Otage is a three-act theatre play by the French author Paul Claudel, and the first one of La Trilogie des Coûfontaine.

== Performances ==
- 1913: Théâtre Scala, London
- 1914: Lugné-Poe, Théâtre de l'Œuvre
- 1928: Firmin Gémier, Théâtre de l'Odéon
- 1931: Ève Francis, Théâtre des Arts
- 1934: Comédie-Française
- 1947: Théâtre national de Chaillot
- 1955: Hubert Gignoux, Centre dramatique de l'Ouest
- 1962: Bernard Jenny, Théâtre du Vieux-Colombier
- 1962: Jean Davy, Tréteaux de France.
- 1968: Jean-Marie Serreau, Comédie-Française
- 1977: Guy Rétoré, Théâtre de l'Est parisien, Festival d'Avignon
- 1995: Marcel Maréchal, Théâtre du Rond-Point
- 2002: Bernard Sobel, Théâtre de Gennevilliers

== See also ==
- Le Pain dur
- Le Père humilié
- List of works by Paul Claudel
