= Le Pain dur =

1918 play by Paul Claudel

Le Pain dur ("hard bread") is a three-act theatre play by French author Paul Claudel, published in 1918 and the second play of La Trilogie des Coûfontaine. The play was performed in Switzerland and Canada by Ludmilla Pitoëff between 1941 and 1943.

== Mises-en-scène ==
- 1949 : André Barsacq, Théâtre de l'Atelier
- 1959 : Guy Parigot, Comédie de l'Ouest
- 1962 : Bernard Jenny, Théâtre du Vieux-Colombier
- 1969 : Jean-Marie Serreau, Comédie-Française
- 1992 : Claude Yersin, Nouveau théâtre d'Angers
- 1995 : Marcel Maréchal, Théâtre du Rond-Point
- 2000 : Frédéric Dussenne, Théâtre des Martyrs (Bruxelles)
- 2000 : Dag Jeanneret
- 2002 : Bernard Sobel, Théâtre de Gennevilliers
- 2003 : Nicole Gros, Théâtre du Nord-Ouest
- 2010 : Agathe Alexis and Alain Alexis Barsacq, Théâtre de l'Atalante

== See also ==
- L'Otage
- Le Père humilié
- List of works by Paul Claudel
