= Pascal Rambert =

French writer and choreographer

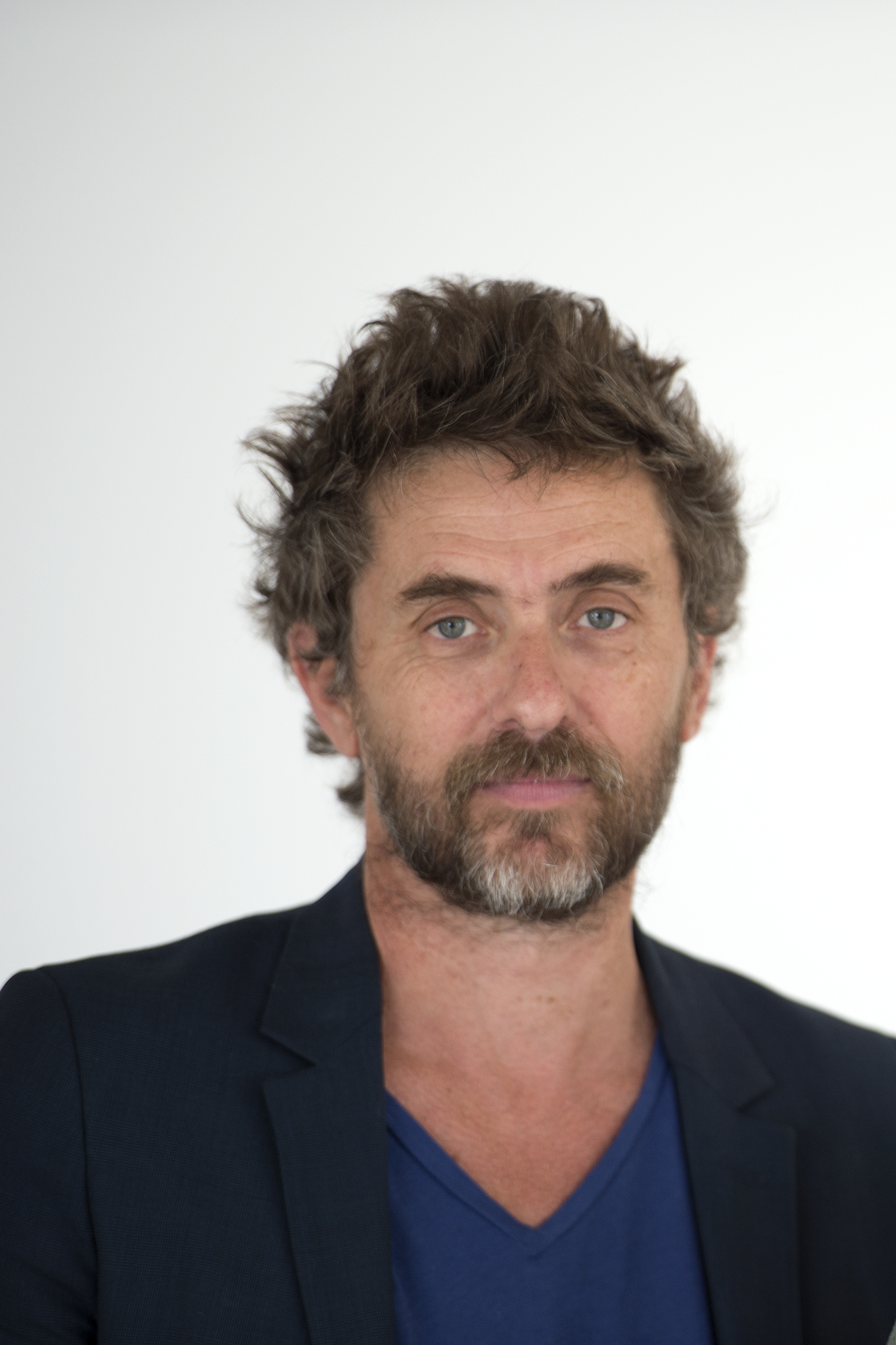
Pascal Rambert in 2015.

Pascal Rambert (French: [paskal ʁɑ̃bɛʁ]) is a French writer, choreographer, and director for the stage and screen. He was born in 1962.

== Biography ==
From 2007 to 2017, he served as the Director of T2G, Théâtre de Gennevilliers, which he turned into a national dramatic center for contemporary creation, exclusively devoted to living artists (theater, dance, opera, contemporary art, film, and philosophy).

Pascal Rambert's plays and dance pieces have been staged in Europe, North America, Asia, Russia, South America and the Middle East. His writing (theater, stories, and poetry) is published in France by Les Solitaires Intempestifs and has been translated, published, and staged in many languages: English, Russian, Italian, German, Japanese, Chinese, Croatian, Slovenian, Polish, Portuguese (Portugal and Brazil), Spanish (Castile, Mexico and Argentina), Catalan, Dutch, Czech, Thai, Danish and Greek.

His dance pieces, including the most recent, Memento Mori, created in 2013 with the light designer Yves Godin, have been performed at major festivals and contemporary dance festivals: Montpellier, Avignon, Utrecht, Geneva, Ljubljana, Skopje, Moscow, Hamburg, Modena, Freiburg, Tokyo and New York.

Pascal Rambert has directed several operas in France and in the United States.

The short films he has directed have been selected and received prizes at festivals in Pantin, Locarno, Miami, and Paris.

His play Clôture de l’amour (Love’s End), created at the 65th Festival d’Avignon in 2011 with Audrey Bonnet and Stanislas Nordey, was an international success. The script won the prize for public theater in the Theater 2013 – Dithea competition, the prize for best new French-language play from the Syndicat de la Critique (Critics’ Union) in 2012, and the Grand Prize for dramatic literature from the French Centre national du théâtre (National Theater Center) in October, 2012.

By September 2018, Clôture de l’amour had been performed more than 180 times in France and far more all over the world. He has adapted Clôture de l’amour into ten languages: for the Moscow Art Theatre; in New York, Zagreb, Modena, and Rome, and at the Piccolo Theatro de Milano; in Shizuoka, Osaka, and Yokohama; in Berlin and at the Thalia Theater in Hamburg; in Barcelona at the Grec Festival and in Madrid at the Festival de Otoño and in Seville; in Copenhagen, Aalborg, Aarhus, and Odense. An Argentinian version and a Chinese (in Mandarin) version are currently in progress.

Rambert created Une (micro) histoire économique du monde, dansée (A (micro) history of world economics, danced) at T2G, Théâtre de Gennevilliers, in 2010. After its French tour, Pascal Rambert adapted the work for further performances in Japan; in Hamburg and Karlsruhe, Germany; in the United States in New York, Los Angeles and Pittsburgh; in Cairo, Egypt and soon in Bangkok, Thailand.

His play Avignon à vie (Avignon for Life), read by Denis Podalydès of the Comédie Française, was first staged at the 2013 67th Festival d’Avignon in the Cour d’Honneur du Palais des Papes.

His play, Répétition (Rehearsal), written for Emmanuelle Béart, Audrey Bonnet, Denis Podalydès of the Comédie Française, Stanislas Nordey, and Claire Zeller, premiered December 12, 2014, at T2G, Théâtre de Gennevilliers- national dramatic center for contemporary creation as part of Festival d’Automne in Paris. It was subsequently performed in Lyon and toured nationally and internationally in the fall of 2015; Lausanne (ch), Poitiers (fr), à Modène within the festival VIE (it), Strasbourg at the Théâtre National de Strasbourg (fr), Clermont Ferrand (fr), Paris at the Théâtre National de Chaillot (fr), Orléans(fr), Chateauvallon (fr) and Valenciennes (fr) .

In 2015, the Académie française recognized Répétition with its annual literature and philosophy Prize.

In January 2016, he premiered his play Argument, written for Laurent Poitrenaux and Marie-Sophie Ferdane, at the CDN Orléans / Loiret / Centre, then presented it at La Comédie in Reims and at the T2G, Théâtre de Gennevilliers - national dramatic center for contemporary creation.

In May 2017, he directed Une vie( A life), which he wrote for the Comédie-Française ensemble, at the Théâtre du Vieux Colombier in Paris.

In August 2017, he directed GHOSTs, written for a group of Taiwanese actors and presented for the opening of the Performing Art Festival in Taipei.

He wrote Actrice (Actress) for the actors of the Art Theater of Moscow and opened it on December 12, 2017, at the Théâtre des Bouffes du Nord in Paris, starring Marina Hands, Audrey Bonnet, Jakob Öhrman, Elmer Bäck, Rasmus Slätis, Jean Guizerix, Emmanuel Cuchet, Ruth Nüesch, Luc Bataïni, Lyna Khoudri, Yuming Hey, Sifan Shao, Laetitia Somé, and alternately, Anas Abidar, Nathan Aznar, and Samuel Kircher.

Actrice toured in France from January to March 2018. Rambert directed Glumica, the Croatian version of Actrice at the National Theatre in Zagreb in February 2019.

In March 2018, he wrote Reconstitution to be performed by Vero Dahuron and Guy Delamotte of the Panta Theatre in Caen.

He wrote Nos Parents (Our Parents) for the student actors of the Manufacture in Lausanne, which opened in his production in April 2018.

In September 2018, he staged his play Christine at the Comédie de Genève during the Festival Julie's Party, then staged Teatro at the Teatro Nacional Dona Maria II in Lisbon, starring Beatriz Batarda, Cirila Bossuet, João Grosso, Lúcia Maria, Rui Mendes.

In November 2018, he directed Soeurs (Sisters) written for Marina Hands and Audrey Bonnet. In December, he directed the Spanish version, Hermanas, with Barbara Lennie and Irene Escolar.

In February 2019, he staged Glumica, the Croatian version of Actrice with the actors of the National Theater of Zagreb.

From February to June 2019, he is Visiting Belknap Fellow in the Humanities and Visiting Lecturer in French and Italian with Florent Masse at Princeton University, New Jersey. By May 2019, he will direct the students in his play Other's.

In March 2019, he created 愛的落幕, the Taiwanese version of Clôture de l'Amour at the Metropolitan Theater of Taipei.

In June 2019, he created Mont Vérité with the TNS school students for the Printemps des Comédiens Festival.

His play Architecture, written for Emmanuelle Béart, Audrey Bonnet, Anne Brochet, Marie-Sophie Ferdane, Arthur Nauzyciel, Stanislas Nordey, Denis Podalydès, Laurent Poitrenaux, Pascal Rénéric and Jacques Weber, has been premiered at the Festival d’Avignon in 2019 (Cour d'Honneur du Palais des Papes).

In November 2019, he created Rakkauden Pãatõs, the Finnish version of Clôture de l'amour at the Finnish National Theater of Helsinki (Finland).

In February 2020, he created Desaparecer in Mexico (UNAM, Merxico city).

He created 3 annonciations for Audrey Bonnet (FR), Silvia Costa (IT), Barbara Lennie (ES) alternately with Itsaso Arana (ES), on September 29, 2020, at the TNB Théâtre National de Bretagne and toured in France and in Europe in 2020–21.

Opening Αδελφές, the Greek version of Soeurs in Athens (Michael Cacoyannis Foundation) in November 2020, Ōed, the Estonian version in Tallinn (Tallinna Linnateater) and Sorelle, the Italian version in Turin (Teatro Astra).

In February 2021, he created STARs in Switzerland (Comédie de Genève).

He created Sorelle, Italian version of Soeurs, opening at Teatro Astra. He wrote and created Dreamers for the TNB's students (opening June 2021 at TNB-Rennes). He wrote and created Deux amis with Charles Berling and Stanislas Nordey (opening July 2021 at Festival d'été of Châteauvallon). He created Kotatsu (September 2021 at Ebarra Riverside Theater, Toyooka, Japon). He directed the play 8 ensemble that he wrote for 8 young actresses and actors created during the Festival d’Automne à Paris, in the frame of Talents Adami Théâtre. January 2022, he adapted with Jim Fletcher and Ismaïl ibn Conner two monologues The Art of Theater and With my own hands, premiered on January 14, 2022, at PS21 (Performance Spaces for the 21st Century), Chatham, NY, co-presented by PS21 and The Public Theater/Under the Radar : On the Road initiative. As of March 2022 he is rehearsing the play that he wrote, Sowane, in Cairo (EGY) (creation October 2022), adapting the French version of the play Perdre son sac with the actress Lyna Khoudri (creation November 2022 in Rabat (MA)), creating the play L’interview that he wrote for Pierrette Monticelli (creation April 2022 in Nest Theater at Thionville, produced by La Joliette Theatre), and writing the play Je te réponds made for 8 prisoners people from the Reau prison center (creation January 2023).

== Directing credits ==
- 1980: Arlequin poli par l'amour (Harlequin, refined by love) by Marivaux
- 1981: La Marcolfa by Dario Fo
- 1982: Léonce et Léna (Léonce and Léna) by Georg Büchner
- 1984: Désir (Desire) by (and directed by) Pascal Rambert, Nouveau Théâtre de Nice
- 1984: Les Lits I (Beds I) by (and directed by) Pascal Rambert, Nouveau Théâtre de Nice
- 1985: Météorologies (Forecasts) by (and directed by) Pascal Rambert, Espace Pierre Cardin (paris)
- 1987: Allez hop! by (and directed by) Pascal Rambert, Ménagerie de Verre (Paris)
- 1987: Fellow of the Centre National des Lettres (National Center of Arts): while in artist's residence at the Chartreuse of Villeneuve-lès-Avignon, he wrote and directed Le Réveil (The Wake-Up), which was then staged at the Paris-Villette theater and afterward toured with "the Amis du Théâtre Populaire (A.T.P.)"
- 1988: 3+2+1 by (and directed by) Pascal Rambert
- 1989: Les Parisiens (The Parisians) by (and directed by) Pascal Rambert, 43rd Festival d’Avignon
- 1990: Burying Molière by John Strand, New York
- 1992: John and Mary by (and directed by) Pascal Rambert, Nanterre-Amandiers theater. (Written while in residence at the Villa Medici's “Hors les Murs” initiative in Alexandria, Egypt.)
- 1992: De mes propres mains (With My Own Hands) by (and directed by) Pascal Rambert, with Eric Doye, Théâtre en Mai (Theater in May) in Dijon.
  - > 1993: New production of With My Own Hands with Charles Berling, Nanterre-Amandiers theater.
  - > 2007: New production of With My Own Hands/Solo with Kate Moran, Bonlieu Scène nationale d’Annecy (Bonlieu National Theater in Annecy), Salins theater, Scène nationale de Martigues (National Theater of Martigues), Ménagerie de Verre (Paris), PS122 in the Crossing the Line Festival in New York, T2G – Théâtre de Gennevilliers, Grü / Grütli Theater in Geneva (Switzerland), Komaba Agora Theater in Tokyo (Japan).
  - > 2015: New production of With My Own Hands with Arthur Nauzyciel, Bouffes du Nord Theater (Paris).
- 1994: The Interview That Dies by Jan Fabre, Royal Flemish Theater in Brussels.
- 1994: Félicité (Bliss) by Jean Audureau, Théâtre de la Commune-Aubervilliers
- 1995: Antony and Cleopatra by William Shakespeare, MC93 Bobigny.
- 1997: Long Island by (and directed by) Pascal Rambert, to promote the E.R.A.C. (l’École Régionale d’Acteurs de Cannes, the Cannes Regional Acting School) which then toured at the National Theaters in Nice and Marseille and at the Ménagerie de Verre (Paris).
- 1997: Journal inédit, 1958-1961 (Unpublished Diary, 1958-1961) by Antoine Vitez, France Culture Reading at the 51st Festival d’Avignon .
- 1997: Race by (and directed by) Pascal Rambert at the Festival Octobre en Normandie, Théâtre Gérard Philipe and in Los Angeles with the Los Angeles Poverty Department Group.
- 1998: Brecht et la musique (Brecht and Music). Cabaret lyrique, Calvet Museum, 52nd Festival d’Avignon.
- 1998: The Epic of Gilgamesh, the man who would not die, in New York (Experimental Theater Wing, New York University) and Damascus.
- 2000: The Epic of Gilgamesh, the man who would not die, Sîn-Leqe-Unninni, at the 54th Festival d’Avignon.
- 2001: Asservissement sexuel volontaire (Voluntary Sex Slavery) by (and directed by) Pascal Rambert, Théâtre National de la Colline (Paris), Théâtre des Salins- Scène National de Martigues and Bonlieu-Scène nationale d’Annecy.
- 2001: “Lecture électrifiée” (“Electric Reading”) from Début de l’A. (The beginning of Love) with Kate Moran, at the Flèche d’or (Paris) and afterward in New York, Miami, Tokyo, etc.
- 2002: La Lève by Jean Audureau, musical direction, reading by the students at the Cannes Regional Acting School (ERAC).
- 2004: Paradis (un temps à déplier) (Paradise (Time to Unfold)) by (and directed by) Pascal Rambert, Théâtre National de la Colline (Paris), Comédie of Caen, New York (Dance Theater Workshop), Bonlieu-Scène nationale d’Annecy, Sarrebruck (Germany)
- 2005: Philomela, opera by James Dillon, Casa da Música Porto (PT), Odéon-Theater of Europe at the Ateliers Berthier, Festival Musica in Strasbourg, Őszi Fesztivá in Budapest (Automne Festival of Budapest )
- 2005: Le Début de l'A. (The beginning of love) by (and directed by) Pascal Rambert, Studio-Theater of the Comédie-Française, reading at the 59th Festival d’Avignon, Théâtre de Gennevilliers.
  - >2008: The beginning of love. Japanese version, by Pascal Rambert, Tokyo, Théâtre de Gennevilliers.
- 2005: To Lose/Perdre/Danse, dance piece by Pascal Rambert, Centre de développement chorégraphique (Center for the Development of Choreography) in Toulouse, graduation project for the class of 2005.
- 2005: La Baie de Tokyo (Tokyo Bay) by Pascal Rambert, reading at the 59th Festival d’Avignon.
- 2005: After/Before by (and directed by) Pascal Rambert, 59th Festival d’Avignon, Bonlieu Scène nationale d'Annecy, Théâtre de Gennevilliers.
- 2005: Pan, opera by Marc Monnet and Christophe Tarkos, National Opera of the Rhine.
- 2006: Un garçon debout (a Standing Boy), choreography by Rachid Ouramdane, performed by Pascal Rambert.
- 2006: Mon fantôme (My Ghost) by (and directed by) Pascal Rambert, Bonlieu Scène nationale d’Annecy Privas Theater, CDC (Center for Choreographic development) of Toulouse, schools in the Hauts de Seine French department, Théâtre de Gennevilliers.
  - > 2014: Production of Mon fantôme in Croatia: Moj Duh at the ZKM of Zagreb.
- 2007: L'Art du théâtre (The Art of Theater) by (and directed by) Pascal Rambert, T2G – Théâtre de Gennevilliers, Tokyo (Japan)
- 2007: Toute la vie (Whole Life) by (and directed by) Pascal Rambert, T2G – Théâtre de Gennevilliers, Bonlieu – Scène nationale d’Annecy, Printemps des arts festival in Monaco.
- 2008: Libido sciendi, dance piece by Pascal Rambert, Montpellier Dance, Ménagerie de verre (Paris), CDC (Center for Choreographic development) of Toulouse, CDC (Center for Choreographic development) Aquitaine, T2G – Théâtre de Gennevilliers, Grü / Grütli Theater in Geneva, Ex Ponto Festival in Ljubljana, MOT Festival in Skopje, @Live Art / Kampnagel Festival in Hamburg.
  - > 2012: New production of Libido sciendi by Pascal Rambert, in the nave of the Grand Palais on the occasion of the cultural programming surrounding MONUMENTA 2012 - Daniel Buren, Saint-Clotilde de La Réunion in the Total Dance Festival, Paris – Picasso Museum, Vanves Theater, Bouffes du Nord Theater (Paris).
- 2008: Inferno, after Dante, Grü/Grütli Theater in Geneva.
- 2009: Portrait/Portrait, dance pieces by Pascal Rambert and Rachid Ouramdane, T2G – Théâtre de Gennevilliers.
- 2009: Qu'est-ce que tu vois ? (What Do You See?) by Marie-José Mondzain, Théâtre de Gennevilliers - La Force de l'Art 02, Grand Palais (Paris).
- 2010: A (micro) history of world economics, danced by Pascal Rambert and Éric Méchoulan, T2G – Théâtre de Gennevilliers, Fujimi Cultural Hall Kirari in Fujimi, Shizuoka at the SPAC-Shizuoka Performing Arts Center, Miyazaki Prefectural Art Center, Le Phénix – National Theater of Valenciennes, Théâtre des Salins Theater – Scène nationale de Martigues, Scène nationale de Cavaillon, CDN (National Dramatic Center) Orléans/Loiret/Centre, Badisches Staatstheater Karlsruhe, LaMaMa - New York in the Crossing the Line Festival, Los Angeles with the LAPD, Dresden (Germany) in the Bügerbühne Festival, Thalia Theater of Hamburg (Germany), Cairo (Egypt) in the DCA Festival, Pittsburgh (U.S.).
- 2010: Armide (Armida) by Jean-Baptiste Lully with the Mercury Baroque Orchestra of Houston, Houston Wortham Center, T2G – Théâtre de Gennevilliers.
- 2010: Knocking on Heaven’s Door, dance piece by Pascal Rambert, Association for Contemporary Dance in Geneva, Swiss Cultural Center in Paris, T2G – Théâtre de Gennevilliers, Nishi Azabu Superdeluxe in Tokyo (Japan), CDC (Center for Choreographic Development) Toulouse/Midi Pyrénées.
- 2011: 16 ans (16 Years) by (and directed by) Pascal Rambert, T2G – Théâtre de Gennevilliers, The Cité de la Danse Agora in Montpellier as part of the Hybrides Festival, the CDN (National Dramatic Center) Orléans/Loiret/Centre, the Ado Festival in Préau, and the Regional Theater Center of Lower Normandy in Vire.
- 2011: Clôture de l’amour (Love’s End) by (and directed by) Pascal Rambert, 65th Festival d’Avignon, T2G – Théâtre de Gennevilliers, Grü/Grütli Theater in Geneva, Teatro Passioni in Modena, Youth Theater Festival in Zagreb, la Comédie in Clermont Ferrand, Pompidou Center, BOZAR dance and theater in Bruxelles, Châteauvallon Theater, TAP in Poitiers, TU in Nantes, Grand R in La Roche-sur-Yon, Nouveau Théâtres of Angers - CDN Pays de la Loire (Loire Region), Théâtre du Nord in Lille, Scène Nationale de Martigues, Theater of the Manufacture - CDN in Nancy, Célestins Theater in Lyon, L’espace Malraux – scène nationale de Chambéry and the Savoie, Saint Quentin Theater in Yvelines, Charleroi, Pau, TEAT Champ Fleuri - Saint-Denis de La Réunion, Saint-Étienne du Rouvray as part of the Autumn Festival in Normandy, La passerelle Saint Brieux, the Théâtre du Rond-Point (Rond-Point Theater) in Paris, Stadtstheater de Karlsruhe (Germany), Théâtre Joliette Minoterie in Marseille, Théâtre du Casino Barrière in Deauville, Bonlieu Scène Nationale, Les trois Pierrots in Saint Cloud, Vanves Theater, Lorient Theater, Panta Theater of Caen, Bouffes du Nord Theater (Paris), National Theater of Strasbourg.
  - > beginning in 2012: Productions in multiple languages of Clôture de l’amour (Love’s End) directed by Pascal Rambert, production and incorporation into the repertoire of the Moscow Art Theatre, production and incorporation into the repertoire of the ZKM– Zagreb, Teatro delle Passioni – Modena, Roma Teatro Vascello - Rome, Salle Bartoli de Trieste, Teatro Filoframmatici de Piancenza, Teatro Metastasio de Prato, Teatro Pubblico de Casalecchio, Teatro Atti de Rimini, Teatro Dusede Genova, Piccolo Teatro of Milan, Abrons Arts Center – New York as part of the Crossing the Line Festival 2013: SPAC - Shizuoka, Knowledge Theatre - Osaka, KAAT - Tokyo, 2014: Thalia Theater of Hamburg, Berlin as part of the Foreign Affairs Festival, Barcelona in the Grec Festival, Madrid in the Festival Otoño a Primavera, the Panorama Festival in Buenos Aires, National Theater of Odense (dk), Århus Theatre, Århus (dk), Ålborg Theatre, Ålborg (dk), Husets Theatre, Copenhagen (dk)
- 2012: 50 minutes by Pascal Rambert, Les Hivernales Festival in Avignon.
- 2013: Memento Mori dance piece by Pascal Rambert, Les Hivernales in Avignon, VIA Festival in Mons, T2G – Théâtre de Gennevilliers, Modena, ZKM - Zagreb, Musica Festival -Strasbourg, Festival NET Centre Meyerhold - Moscow, Utrecht Spring Dance, Bouffes du Nord Theater (Paris).
- 2013: Avignon à vie (Avignon For Life) by Pascal Rambert read by Denis Podalydès, Cour d’Honneur du Palais des Papes at the 67th Festival d’Avignon, T2G – Théâtre de Gennevilliers, CNCDC (of Chateauvallon, Bouffes du Nord Theater (Paris).
- 2014: Revenir (To Return), dance piece at the Mini-Teater of Ljubljana (Slovenia).
- 2014: Répétition (Rehearsal) by (and directed by) Pascal Rambert, T2G - Théâtre de Gennevilliers as part of the Festival d’Automne in Paris, Célestins Theater with the Théâtre Radiant Bellevue of Lyon / Caluires, Vidy Theater - Lausanne, TAP of Poitiers, Modena (Italy) as part of the VIE Festival, National Theater of Strasbourg, the Comédie of Clermont-Ferrand, National Theater of Chaillot, CDN (National Theater Center) Orléans / Loiret / Centre, CNCDC (National Center for Contemporary Dramatic Arts) Chateauvallon, Le Phénix of Valenciennes.
- 2016: Argument by (and directed by) Pascal Rambert, Orléans, Reims, T2G - Théâtre de Gennevilliers. Prova, Italian version of Répétition, Teatro Arena del Sole di Bologna. Thaï version of Une (micro) histoire économique du monde, dansée, Bangkok (Thaïland).
- 2017: Creation of structure production, his production company, directed by Pauline Roussille. Clausura del amor, Theater Pavón Kamikaze, Madrid. UBU Prize for L'Arte del Teatro (best foreign play in Italy). نهاية الحب, Arabic version of Clôture de l'Amour, Falaki Theater, D-CAF Festival, Cairo. Une Vie, by (and directed by) Pascal Rambert, Comédie-Française, Théâtre du Vieux Colombier. GHOST's, by (and directed by) Pascal Rambert, Art Taipei Festival, Taïwan. Ensayo, Spanish version of Répétition, Pavón Kamikaze, Madrid. Israeli version of Une (micro) histoire économique du monde, dansée, Tel Aviv, Israel. Actrice (Actress), by (and directed by) Pascal Rambert, Théâtre des Bouffes du Nord, Paris.
- 2018: Reconstitution, by (and directed by) Pascal Rambert, Panta Théâtre, Caen, France. Nos Parents, by (and directed by) Pascal Rambert, Théâtre Vidy Lausanne, Switzerland. Christine, by (and directed by) Pascal Rambert, Julie's Party Festival, Comédie de Genève, Switzerland. Teatro, by (and directed by) Pascal Rambert with Beatriz Batarda, Cirila Bossuet, João Grosso, Lúcia Maria, Rui Mendes, Teatro Nacional Dona Maria II, Lisbon, Portugal. Soeurs (Sisters), by (and directed by) Pascal Rambert, with Marina Hands and Audrey Bonnet, Bonlieu Scène Nationale, Annecy, France. Hermanas, Spanish version of Soeurs, with Barbara Lennie and Irène Escolar, Teatro Central, Séville, Spain
- 2019: Glumica, Croatian version of Actrice, National Theater, Zagreb, Croatia. 愛的落幕, Taiwanese version of Clôture de l'Amour, Metropolitan Theater, Taipei. Visiting Belknap Fellow in the Humanities and Visiting Lecturer in French and Italian with Florent Masse at Princeton University, New Jersey, and creation of Other's with the students of Princeton University. L'Art du Théâtre and De mes propres mains with Arthur Nauzyciel at Théâtre du Rond-Point (Paris) and Théâtre National de Bretagne (Rennes). Opening 愛的落幕, Taiwanese version of Clôture de l'Amour at the Metropolitan Theater of Taipei. From February to June 2019, Visiting Lecturer in French and Italian at Princeton University, New Jersey. Other's by (and directed by) Pascal Rambert with the students of Princeton University, New Jersey. 愛的落幕, the Taiwanese version of Clôture de l'Amour at the Metropolitan Theater of Taipei. Mont Vérité with the TNS school students for the Printemps des Comédiens Festival. His play Architecture, written for Emmanuelle Béart, Audrey Bonnet, Anne Brochet, Marie-Sophie Ferdane, Arthur Nauzyciel, Stanislas Nordey, Denis Podalydès, Laurent Poitrenaux, Pascal Rénéric and Jacques Weber, has been premiered at the Festival d’Avignon in 2019 (Cour d'Honneur du Palais des Papes). Nos Parents at the Comédie de Genève and Christine at the Theater Les Halles (Sierre, Switzerland). Avignon à vie with Stanislas Nordey, at the Princeton French Theater Festival (New Jersey). Architecture tour at the TNB, Théâtre National de Bretagne, TNS, Théâtre national de Strasbourg and Théâtre des Bouffes du Nord - Paris. New Project at the Festival Les Récréatrales (Burkina Faso, Ouagadoudgou). Glumica at the National Theater of Zagreb and Un finale di amor at the Franco Parenti Theater of Milan. Opening Rakkauden Pãatõs on November 8, Finnish version of Clôture de l'amour at the Finnish National Theater, Finland.
- 2020 : Architecture tour in France and Italy : Bonlieu - scène nationale d'Annecy, Comédie de Clermont, Les Gémeaux de Sceaux, Le Phénix scène nationale, les Célestins théâtre de Lyon, Emilia Romagna Teatro Fondazione (Bologna). In February, opening Desaparecer at Teatro Juan Ruiz de Alarcòn (UNAM, Mexico City, Mexico).

== Published works ==
- 1988: Le Réveil (The Wake-Up), Actes Sud-Papiers
- 1989: Les Parisiens ou l'Été de la mémoire des abeilles (The Parisians or the Summer of the Memory of Bees), Actes Sud-Papiers
- 1992: John & Mary followed by Les Dialogues(Dialogues), Actes Sud-Papiers
- 1997: De mes propres mains (With My Own Hands), Solitaires Intempestifs
- 1997: Race,
- 1998: Long Island, Solitaires intempestifs
- 2000: Asservissement sexuel volontaire (Voluntary Sex Slavery), Solitaires Intempestifs
- 2000: Récit de la préparation de Gilgamesh jusqu'à la première répétition en Avignon (Telling of the preparation of Gilgamesh up to the first rehearsal in Avignon), Solitaires intempestifs
- 2001: Le Début de l'A. (The Beginning of love), Solitaires Intempestifs
- 2001: “ASV p.r; auto-interview trafiquée en plein air 6204+3,” (“VSS p.r, Auto-interview trafficked in the open air),” in LEXI/textes n°5, L'Arche
- 2003: “Où le plus grand événement est l’envol d’un coq de bruyère, nouvelle auto-interview enregistrée à Kyoto et Tokyo en avril 2003, (exemplaire 002),” (“In which the most major event is a grouse taking flight, new auto-interview recorded in Kyoto and Tokyo in April, 2003 (number 002),” in LEXI/textes n°7, L'Arche
- 2004: Paradis (un temps à déplier), (Paradise (Time to Unfold)), Solitaires intempestifs
- 2004: Mon fantôme (cantate) (My Ghost (cantante)), Solitaires intempestifs
- 2007: Gennevilliers roman 0708 (Gennevilliers Novel 0708), Solitaires Intempestifs
- 2007: Toute la vie followed by L'Art du théâtre (The whole life followed by The Art of Theater), Solitaires intempestifs
- 2010: Avignon à vie (Avignon for Life), Solitaires Intempestifs
- 2011: Clôture de l'amour (Love’s End), Solitaires Intempestifs
- 2012: Ende einer Liebe (Clôture de l'amour in German, translated by Peter Stephan Jungk), S. Fischer Verlag
- 2013: Clausura del Amor (Clôture de l'amour translated into Mexican Spanish by Humberto Perez Mortera), Editions Los Textos de La Capilla
- 2013: Clôture de l'amour (translated into Italian by Bruna Filippi), Editions Emilia Romagna Teatro Fondazione
- 2013: Zatvaranje ljubavi (Clôture de l'amour translated into Croatian by Ivica Buljan), Editions Fraktura
- 2013: Closing of Love (Clôture de l'amour translated into Thaï by Pakawalee Kongkrapan and Phrae Chittiphalangsri), Butterfly Editions
- 2014: Répétition(Rehearsal), Solitaires Intempestifs
- 2015: Lac (followed with) Libido Sciendi, Solitaires Intempestifs
- 2016: Argument, Solitaires Intempestifs
- 2017: Actrice, Solitaires Intempestifs
- 2017: Reconstitution, Solitaires Intempestifs
- 2017: New edition of Clôture de l'amour (Love's End), collection Classiques Contemporains, by Solitaires Intempestifs
- 2017: Une Vie, Solitaires Intempestifs
- 2018: Soeurs, Solitaires Intempestifs
- 2019: Architecture, Solitaires Intempestifs
- 2020 : Mes frères, Solitaires Intempestifs
- 2020 : 3 annonciations, Solitaires Intempestifs
- 2021 : Deux amis, Solitaires Intempestifs
- 2021 : TOI, Solitaires Intempestifs

About Pascal Rambert

- 2005: Laurent Goumarre, Rambert en temps réel (Rambert in Real Time), Solitaires intempestifs
- 2017: Théâtres, 1987-2001, Solitaires Intempestifs
- 2019 : Mon cœur mis à nu (interviews by Laure Adler), Solitaires Intempestifs

== Filmography ==
Acting credits

- 2000: Le Bel Hiver (The Beautiful Winter), short film by Olivier Torres

Documentary

- 2004: Paradise Now - Journal d'une femme en crise (Diary of a Woman in Crisis), by Yolande Zauberman
- 2006: Noise, by Olivier Assayas

Short films directed

- 2004: Quand nous étions punk (When we were punk). (16 min – 35 mm)

With Kate Moran and Nicolas Granger. Cinematography: Caroline Champetier. Production: Les Films du Bélier with the participation of France 2 Selection of the Locarno Film Festival 2004 – Paris Tout Court 2004 – Travelling Rennes 2005 – Larissa 2005, Nice 2005 – Caen 2005 – Paris Onze bouge 2005 – Cork 2005 – Aye Aye Festival in Nancy – Rome Festival

- 2005: Car Wash (10 min – HD)

With Kate Moran and Olivier Torres. Cinematography: Caroline Champetier. Production: Les Films du Bélier with the participation of France 2 and the Regional Council of the Pays de la Loire (Loire Region) and the support of the Délégation Aux Arts Plastiques. Selection of the Locarno Film Festival 2005 – Rome Film Festival 2006

- 2006: Début (Beginning) (25 min – 35mm)

With Véronique Porral and Antoine Formica. Cinematography: Yorick Leseaux. Production: Les Films du Bélier with the participation of France 2, of the CNC (National Center of Cinematography) COSIP and the support of the Rhône-Alpes Region and the Département of the Haute-Savoie. “Prix de qualité” Prize of the CNC (National Center of Cinematography). Selection of the Vendôme Festival – Locarno Festival – Rome Festival – Rencontres du cinéma Européen de Vannes (Vannes European Film Meetings) (Prix de la ville de Vannes / Prize of the City of Vannes) – Short Film Festival of Nice – Paris Cinéma Festival – Côté court (Short Side) Festival of Pantin (GNCR Prize)

- 2008: Avant que tu reviennes (Before you come back) (30 min – 35 mm)

With Kate Moran, Clémentine Baert, David Bobée, Lorenzo de Angelis, Gilles Groppo, Grégory Guilbert, Julien Joannel, Antonin Ménard, Alexandre Meyer, Cécile Musitelli, Ikue Nakagawa, Vincent Thomasset, and Virginie Vaillant. Cinematography: Sébastien Buchman. Production: Les Films du bélier with the participation of the CNC (National Center of Cinematography) programming fund and the PROCIREP

- 2009: Premier anniversaire (First birthday) (25 min – 35 mm)

With Kate Moran, Lou Rambert-Preiss, Josette and René Graner. Cinematography: Caroline Champetier Production: Les Films du Belier with the participation of France 2, the support of CNC (National Center of Cinematography), and the support of the Lorraine Regional Council, the PROCIREP, and the ANGOA-AGICOA. Locarno Festival 2009. International Film Festival Selection—Locarno – International Short Film Festival Leuven 2009

- 2020 : 3 annonciations (1h30) with Audrey Bonnet, Silvia Costa and Itsaso Arana. Cinematography : Caroline Champetier Production structure production.

== Awards and distinctions ==
- 1985: Météorologie special award / Printemps du théâtre (Spring of the Theater)
- 1991: “Hors Les Murs” award of the Villa Medici / residency in Alexandria (Egypt)
- 2003: Award of the Kujuyama Villa / Residency in Kyoto (Japan) for the writing of Paradis (paradise)
- 2012: Award of the Syndicat de la critique (Critics’ Union) for Clôture de l'amour (Love’s End), meilleure création d'une pièce en langue française (best new French-language play).
- 2012: Grand Prize in Dramatic Literature 2012 for Clôture de l'amour (Love’s End) - Les Solitaires intempestifs
- 2013: Named as Chevalier de l'Ordre des Arts et des Lettres by Aurélie Filippetti, French Minister of Culture
- 2013: Prix de l'auteur (Author's Award) for Clôture de l'amour (Love's End) at the Palmarès du théâtre
- 2015: nomination for the French living author by the Molières Academy for Répétition
- 2015: Académie française literature and philosophy Prize Prix Émile Augier for Répétition
- 2017: Prize of SACD
- 2019 : Transfuge Prize for the text Architecture
