= Serreau =

Serreau is a surname. Notable people with the surname include:

- Coline Serreau (born 1947), French actress and film director
- Geneviève Serreau (1915–1981), French stage actress and playwright
- Jean-Marie Serreau (1915–1973), French theatre director
