= Stanislas Nordey =

French actor and theatre director (born 1966)

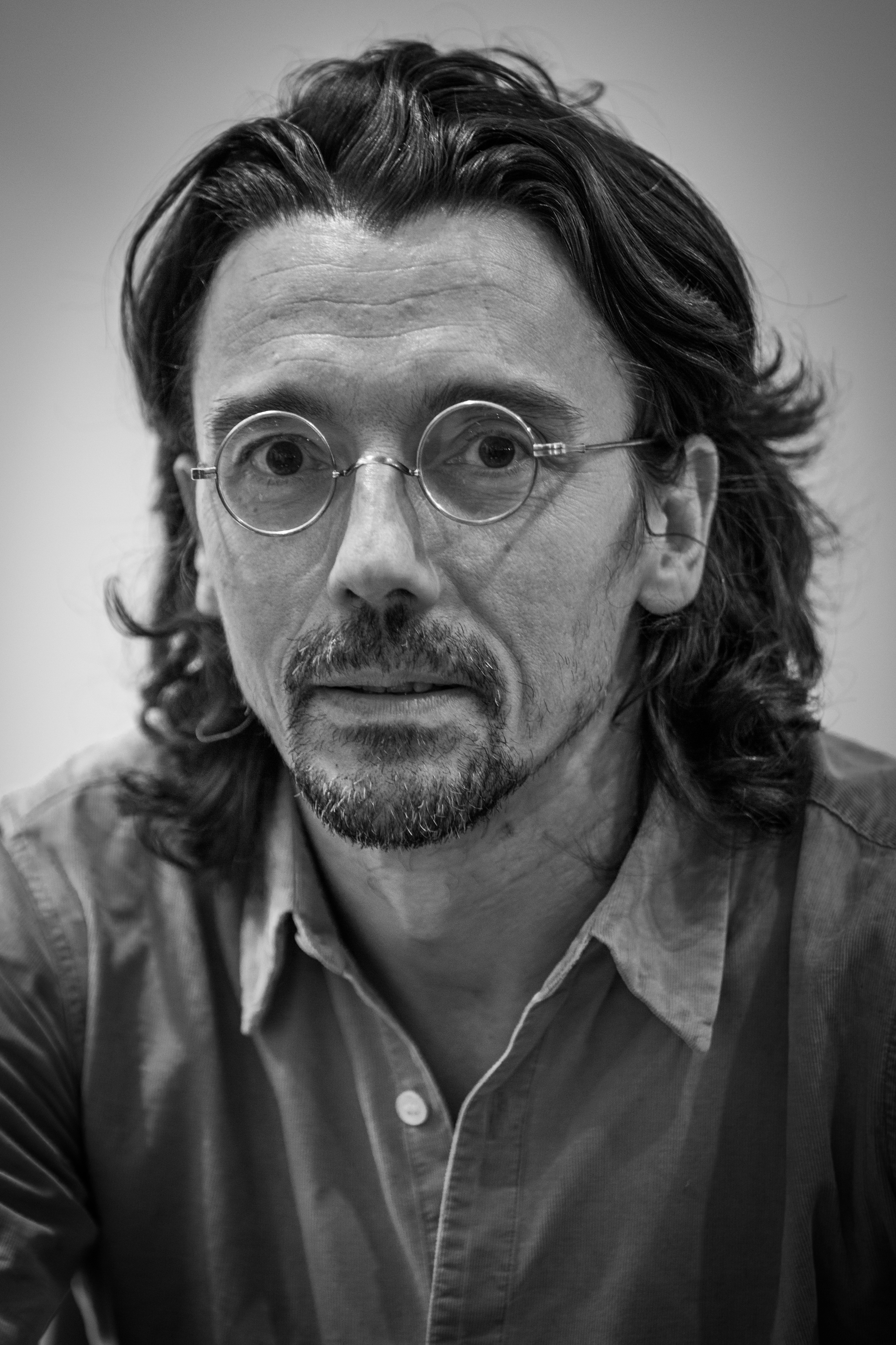
Stanislas Nordey (2015)

Stanislas Nordey (born 1966) is a French actor and theatre director. He is the son of actress Véronique Nordey and film director Jean-Pierre Mocky.

== Biography ==
Nordey was born in Paris. After his studies at the Conservatoire national supérieur d'art dramatique, he made his directorial debut in 1988, with La Dispute by Marivaux at the Théâtre Pitoëff in Geneva. He is known for his innovative directing, in particular, texts by Pier Paolo Pasolini (Bêtes de style in 1992 at the Festival d'Avignon Off, Porcherie, etc.) and by Werner Schwab, and also for his direction of operas.

From 1994 to 1997, he was the artist associated with the Théâtre Nanterre-Amandiers at the invitation of Jean-Pierre Vincent and, from 1998 to 2001, he worked at the Théâtre Gérard Philipe - Centre dramatique national in Saint-Denis before leaving due to the severe financial crisis. He explained this failure, his adventures in "citizen theatre" and related his artistic journey in his interview collection, Passions civiles.

Today, he is teaching director at the high school of the Théâtre national de Bretagne. In 2008 he won the "Laurence Olivier Award" in London for the opera Pelléas et Mélisande.

== Theatre ==
Actor

- 1990 : Shaptai by Raphaël Sadin, director Madeleine Marion
- 1990 : Combat dans l’ouest by Vsevolod Vishnevsky, director Jean-Pierre Vincent
- 2002 : Quai ouest by Bernard-Marie Koltès, director Jean-Christophe Saïs
- 2003 : Orgia by Pier Paolo Pasolini, director Laurent Sauvage
- 2004 : Pasteur Ephraïm Magnus by Hans Henny Jahnn, director Christine Letailleur
- 2005 : Les Habitants by Frédéric Mauvignier, director Stanislas Nordey, Théâtre Ouvert
- 2007 : Philosophy in the Bedroom by Sade, director Christine Letailleur
- 2007 : Thérèse Philosophe, director Anatoly Vasiliev
- 2008 : La Ballade de la geôle de Reading by Oscar Wilde, director Céline Pouillon, Maison de la Poésie
- 2010 : Les Justes by Albert Camus, director Stanislas Nordey, Théâtre national de la Colline

Director

- 1988 : La Dispute by Marivaux, Théâtre Pitoëff Genève, Festival d'Avignon Off
- 1991 : Bête de style by Pier Paolo Pasolini, Théâtre Gérard Philipe Saint-Denis
- 1992 : Le Bon Sens by Jorgos Magnotis, written for Festival d'Avignon
- 1992 : La Légende de Siegfried by Stanislas Nordey, Théâtre de Sartrouville, Festival Enfantillages, Théâtre Gérard Philipe
- 1992 : La Dispute by Marivaux
- 1992 : Tarataba by Bernard-Marie Koltès, Théâtre Gérard Philipe
- 1992 : La Conquête du pôle sud by Manfred Karge, Théâtre Vidy-Lausanne, Théâtre Gérard Philipe
- 1993 : Calderon by Pier Paolo Pasolini
- 1993 : Abou et Maïmouna, Festival Enfantillages
- 1993 : Notes sur Pylade, Festival de Saint-Herblain
- 1993 : 14 pièces piégées by Armando Llamas, Studio Théâtre du CDRC de Nantes
- 1994 : Pylade by Pier Paolo Pasolini, Le Quartz, Théâtre Gérard Philipe
- 1994 : Vole mon dragon by Hervé Guibert, Festival d'Avignon, Théâtre de la Bastille
- 1994 : La Suffocation mécanique by Hervé Guibert, written for the Festival d'Avignon
- 1994 : La Vraie Vie d'Hector F. by Stanislas Nordey, Théâtre de Sartrouville
- 1995 : Splendid's by Jean Genet, Théâtre des Amandiers
- 1995 : Ciment by Heiner Müller, Théâtre des Amandiers
- 1995 : Un mal imaginaire by Maxime Montel, written for the Festival d'Avignon
- 1995 : A Midsummer Night's Dream by William Shakespeare, Théâtre des Amandiers
- 1996 : Un étrange voyage by Nazim Hikmet, Espace Malraux Chambéry, Théâtre de la Ville
- 1996 : La Noce by Stanisław Wyspiański, Théâtre des Amandiers
- 1997 : Contention by Didier-Georges Gabily after La Dispute by Marivaux and others, Festival d'Avignon, Théâtre des Amandiers
- 1997 : Champ contrechamp by Philippe Minyana, written for Festival d'Avignon
- 1997 : J'étais dans ma maison et j'attendais que la pluie vienne by Jean-Luc Lagarce, Théâtre Ouvert Paris
- 1998 : Mirad, un garçon de Bosnie by Ad de Bont, Théâtre Gérard Philipe
- 1998 : Tartuffe by Molière
- 1998 : Les Comédies féroces by Werner Schwab
- 1999 : Pigsty by Pier Paolo Pasolini, Théâtre Gérard Philipe
- 1999 : Les Trois Sœurs, opera by Peter Eötvös, created by Utrecht
- 2000 : Récits de naissance by Roland Fichet, Philippe Minyana and Jean-Marie Piemme, Passerelle de Saint-Brieuc
- 2001 : Violences by Didier-Georges Gabily, Théâtre national de Bretagne
- 2002 : L’Epreuve du feu by Magnus Dahlström, Théâtre national de Bretagne
- 2003 : Atteintes à sa vie by Martin Crimp, Festival d'Avignon, Théâtre national de Bretagne
- 2003 : A Flea in Her Ear by Georges Feydeau, Théâtre national de Bretagne, Théâtre de la Colline
- 2004 : Le Triomphe de l'amour by Marivaux, Théâtre national de Bretagne
- 2004 : Deux morceaux de verre coupant by Mario Batista, written for the Librairie de Paris
- 2005 : Les Habitants by Frédéric Mauvignier, Théâtre Ouvert
- 2005 : Cris by Laurent Gaudé, Théâtre Ouvert
- 2005 : Le Bain by Jean-Luc Lagarce, Théâtre Ouvert
- 2006 : Gênes 01 and Peanuts by Fausto Paravidino, Théâtre national de Bretagne
- 2007 : Électre by Hugo von Hofmannsthal, Théâtre de la Colline
- 2007 : The Screens by Jean Genet, Studio-théâtre de Vitry, Festival d'Avignon
- 2007 : Incendies by Wajdi Mouawad, Théâtre National de Bretagne
- 2008 : Pélleas et Mélisande by Debussy, Austria and London, Covent Garden (2008 Sir Laurence Olivier Prize)
- 2008 : Sept secondes (In God we trust) by Falk Richter, Théâtre du Rond-Point
- 2008 : Das System (Le Système) by Falk Richter, Festival d'Avignon, Théâtre national de Bretagne
- 2010 : Les Justes by Albert Camus, Théâtre national de la Colline
- 2014: Joyeux animaux de la misère, by Pierre Guyotat

== Opera ==
Director

- 1997 : Le Rossignol by Igor Stravinsky, Théâtre du Châtelet
- 1997 : Pierrot lunaire by Arnold Schoenberg, Théâtre du Châtelet
- 1998 : Le Grand Macabre by György Ligeti, after Enschede
- 1998 : Three Sisters by Peter Eötvös after Chekhov, Opéra de Lyon
- 2000 : Kopernikus by Claude Vivier, after Banff
- 2000 : Héloïse et Abélard by Ahmed Essyad, written by Opéra national du Rhin, Festival Musica Théâtre du Châtelet
- 2002 : Le Balcon by Peter Eötvös after Jean Genet, created for Festival d'Aix-en-Provence
- 2003 : Capuletti et Montechi by Vincenzo Bellini, Staatsoper Hannover
- 2003 : Jeanne au bûcher by Arthur Honegger, Festival in the Ruhr
- 2004 : Les Nègres by Michael Lévinas after Jean Genet, created by the Opéra de Lyon
- 2004 : Saint François d'Assise by Olivier Messiaen, Opéra Bastille
- 2008 : Melancholia by Georg Friedrich Haas, Opéra Garnier

== Cinema ==
Actor

- 1986 : On a volé Charlie Spencer ! by Francis Huster
- 1993 : Three Colors: Blue by Krzysztof Kieslowski
- 1995 : Don't Forget You're Going to Die by Xavier Beauvois

== Bibliography ==
- Stanislas Nordey and Valérie Lang, Passions civiles, interview with Yan Ciret and Franck Laroze, Éditions La Passe du Vent, 2000 - ISBN 2845620187
- (in Italian) Il corpo del testo, preface by Pier Paolo Pasolini, Teatro, Milan, A. Mondadori, 2001
