= Bernard Jenny =

French dramatist, theatre director and scenic designer

- Born: 18 March 1931; Strasbourg
- Died: 5 March 2011 (aged 79)
- Occupations: Dramatist, theatre director, scenic designer

Bernard Jenny (18 March 1931 – 5 March 2011) was a French dramatist, theatre director and scenic designer. He directed the Théâtre de Lutèce until 1958 and was director of the Théâtre du Vieux-Colombier from 1959 to 1970.

== Television ==
- 1987: Les Enquêtes du commissaire Maigret, episode Maigret's Failure by Gilles Katz

== Theatre ==
Comedian

- 1956: La corde pour te pendre by Frédéric Valmain after Malice by Pierre Mac Orlan, directed by Bernard Jenny, Comédie de Paris
- 1956: La Cuisine des anges by Albert Husson, directed by Christian-Gérard, Théâtre des Célestins
- 1957: La Carmen by André de Richaud, directed by Bernard Jenny, Théâtre de Lutèce

Dramatist

- 1983: Stanislas l'enchanteur by and directed by Bernard Jenny, Semaine du théâtre, Le Maillon, Strasbourg
- 1984: Sila, princesse de Mélimélonie by and directed by Bernard Jenny, Le Maillon, Strasbourg

Theatre director

- 1955: The Man with the Flower in His Mouth by Luigi Pirandello, Studio des Champs-Élysées
- 1956: Sisyphe et le mort by Robert Merle, Théâtre de Lutèce
- 1956: Le Pauvre Bougre et le Bon Génie by Alphonse Allais, Théâtre de Lutèce
- 1956: La corde pour te pendre by Frédéric Valmain after Malice by Pierre Mac Orlan, Comédie de Paris
- 1957: The Love of Don Perlimplín and Belisa in the Garden by Federico García Lorca, Théâtre de Lutèce
- 1957: La Carmen by André de Richaud, Théâtre de Lutèce
- 1960: Das Käthchen von Heilbronn by Heinrich von Kleist, Théâtre de l'Alliance française
- 1960: Christobal de Lugo by Loys Masson, Théâtre du Vieux-Colombier
- 1961: Arden de Feversham Théâtre du Vieux-Colombier
- 1962: Polyeucte by Corneille, Théâtre du Vieux-Colombier
- 1962: L'Otage by Paul Claudel, Théâtre du Vieux-Colombier
- 1962: Le Pain dur by Paul Claudel, Théâtre du Vieux-Colombier
- 1962: Le Père humilié by Paul Claudel, Théâtre du Vieux-Colombier
- 1963: Blood Wedding by Federico Garcia Lorca, Théâtre du Vieux-Colombier
- 1964: Yerma by Federico Garcia Lorca, Théâtre Hébertot
- 1964–1965: Lucrezia Borgia by Victor Hugo, Théâtre du Vieux-Colombier, Festival du Marais, Ancient Theatre of Fourvière Lyon, Festival de Montauban, Théâtre des Galeries Brussels
- 1965: Liolà by Luigi Pirandello, Théâtre du Vieux-Colombier
- 1965: Saint-Euloge de Cordoue by Maurice Clavel, Théâtre du Vieux-Colombier
- 1967: Et moi aussi j'existe by Georges Neveux, Théâtre du Vieux-Colombier
- 1967: Des petits bonhommes dans du papier journal by Jean-Claude Darnal, Théâtre du Vieux-Colombier
- 1968: Polyeucte by Corneille, Théâtre du Vieux-Colombier
- 1968: Mithridate by Racine, Théâtre du Vieux-Colombier
- 1968: Biedermann und die Brandstifter by Max Frisch, Théâtre du Vieux-Colombier
- 1969: Tartuffe by Molière, Théâtre du Vieux-Colombier
- 1969: Platonov by Anton Chekhov, Théâtre du Vieux-Colombier
- 1977: Le Chariot d'or by Mario Gautherat, Théâtre Municipal at Strasbourg then Mulhouse
- 1981: La Voyage by Martin Graff and Roger Siffer, Pléiade d'Alsace Strasbourg Le Maillon
- 1982: Dieu est alsacienne by Martin Graff and Roger Siffer, Le Maillon, Strasbourg
- 1983: Stanislas l'enchanteur by Bernard Jenny, Le Maillon, Strasbourg
- 1984: La Voix humaine by Jean Cocteau, Le Maillon, Strasbourg
- 1984: Sila, princesse de mélimélonie by Bernard Jenny, Le Maillon, Strasbourg
- 1985: The Little Prince by Antoine de Saint-Exupéry, Théâtre La Choucrouterie, Strasbourg
- 1985: Mangeront-ils ? by Victor Hugo, Le Maillon Strasbourg et Septembre artistique, Nancy

Scenic designer

- 1969: Platonov by Anton Chekhov, Théâtre du Vieux-Colombier
