= Le Père humilié =

Le Père humilié is a four-act theatre play by Paul Claudel, which constitutes the third and last part of La Trilogie des Coûfontaine.

== Staging ==
- 1962: Bernard Jenny, Théâtre du Vieux-Colombier

== See also ==
- L'Otage
- Le Pain dur
- List of works by Paul Claudel
