= List of works by Paul Claudel =

This page presents the works of the French author Paul Claudel (1868 – 1955), one-time French ambassador to the United States and Brazil.

== Works ==
Theatre

- 1887 : L'Endormie (first version)
- 1888 : Fragment d'un drame
- 1890 : Tête d'or (first version)
- 1892 : La Jeune Fille Violaine (first version)
- 1893 : La Ville (first version) The City
- 1894 : Tête d'or (second version); L'Échange (first version)
- 1899 : La Jeune Fille Violaine (second version)
- 1901 : La Ville (second version)
- 1901 : Le Repos du septième jour
- 1906 : Partage de midi Break of Noon, drama (first version)
- 1911 : L'Otage, The Hostage drama in three acts
- 1912 : L'Annonce faite à Marie The Annunciation of Mary (first version)
- 1913 : Protée, 2-act satirical drama (first version)
- 1917 : L'Ours et la Lune
- 1918 : Le Pain dur, drama in three acts
- 1919 : Les Choéphores d'Eschyle
- 1920 : Le Père humilié, drama in four acts
- 1920 : Les Euménides d'Eschyle
- 1926 : Protée, 2-act satirical drama (second version)
- 1927 : Sous le Rempart d'Athènes
- 1929 : The Satin Slipper, action espagnole en quatre journées (créé partiellement in 1943 by Jean-Louis Barrault, en version intégrale at the théâtre d'Orsay in 1980; la version intégrale a été reprise in 1987 by Antoine Vitez)
- 1933 : Le Livre de Christophe Colomb, The Book of Christopher Columbus lyrical drama in two parts
- 1939 : Jeanne d'Arc au bûcher
- 1939 : La Sagesse ou la Parabole du destin
- 1942 : L'Histoire de Tobie et de Sara, morality in three acts
- 1947 : L'Endormie (second version)
- 1948 : L'Annonce faite à Marie (second version)
- 1949 : Protée, 2-act satirical drama (second version)
- 1954 : L'Échange (second version)

Portrait of Paul Claudel by Félix Vallotton printed in Le Livre des masques by Remy de Gourmont (vol. II, 1898).

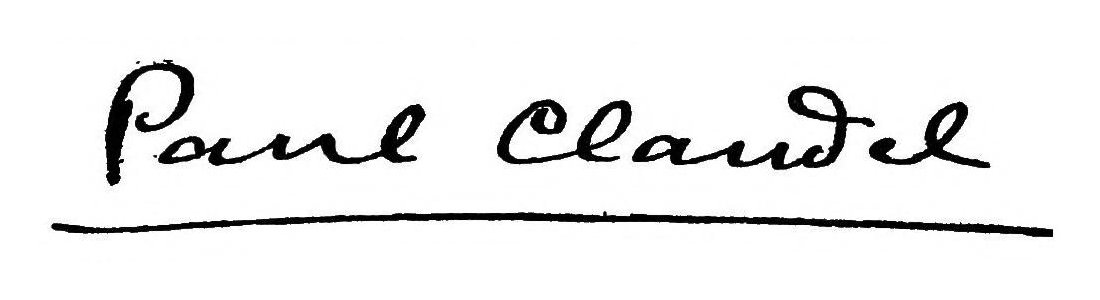
Signature of Paul Claudel 1914

Poetry

- 1900, then 1907 (2nd éd.): Connaissance de l'Est The East I Know
- 1905 : Poèmes de la Sexagésime
- 1907 : Processionnal pour saluer le siècle nouveau
- 1911 : Cinq grandes Odes Five Great Odes
- 1911 : Le Chemin de la Croix
- 1911–1912 : La Cantate à trois voix
- 1915 : Corona benignitatis anni dei
- 1919 : La Messe là-bas
- 1922 : Poèmes de guerre (1914-1916) Three Poems of the War
- 1925 : Feuilles de saints
- 1942 : Cent phrases pour éventails A Hundred Movements for a Fan
- 1945 : Visages radieux
- 1945 : Dodoitzu, illustrations by Rihakou Harada.
- 1949 : Accompagnements

Essais

- 1928 : Positions et propositions, tome I
- 1929 : L'Oiseau noir dans le soleil levant
- 1934 : Positions et propositions, tome II
- 1935 : Conversations dans le Loir-et-Cher
- 1936 : Figures et paraboles
- 1940 : Contacts et circonstances
- 1942 : Seigneur, apprenez-nous à prier
- 1946 : L'œil écoute The Eye Listens
- 1949 : Emmaüs
- 1950 : Une voix sur Israël
- 1951 : L'Évangile d'Isaïe
- 1952 : Paul Claudel interroge l'Apocalypse
- 1954 : Paul Claudel interroge le Cantique des Cantiques
- 1955 : J'aime la Bible, Fayard I Believe in God
- 1956 : Conversation sur Jean Racine
- 1957 : Sous le signe du dragon
- 1958 : Qui ne souffre pas... Réflexions sur le problème social
- 1958 : Présence et prophétie
- 1959 : La Rose et le rosaire
- 1959 : Trois figures saintes pour le temps actuel

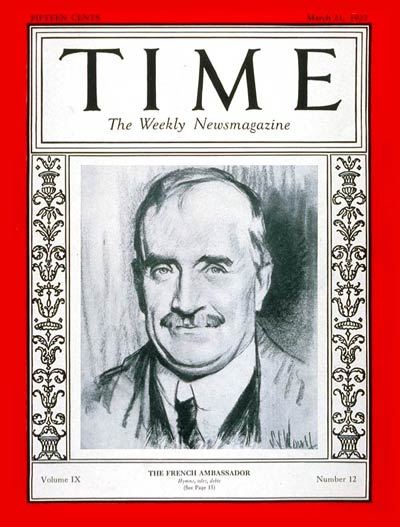
Paul Claudel, French ambassador at Washington. Time Magazine' cover, 21 March 1927

Memories, diary

- 1954 : Mémoires improvisés. Quarante et un entretiens with Jean Amrouche
- 1968 : Journal. Tome I : 1904-1932
- 1969 : Journal. Tome II : 1933-1955

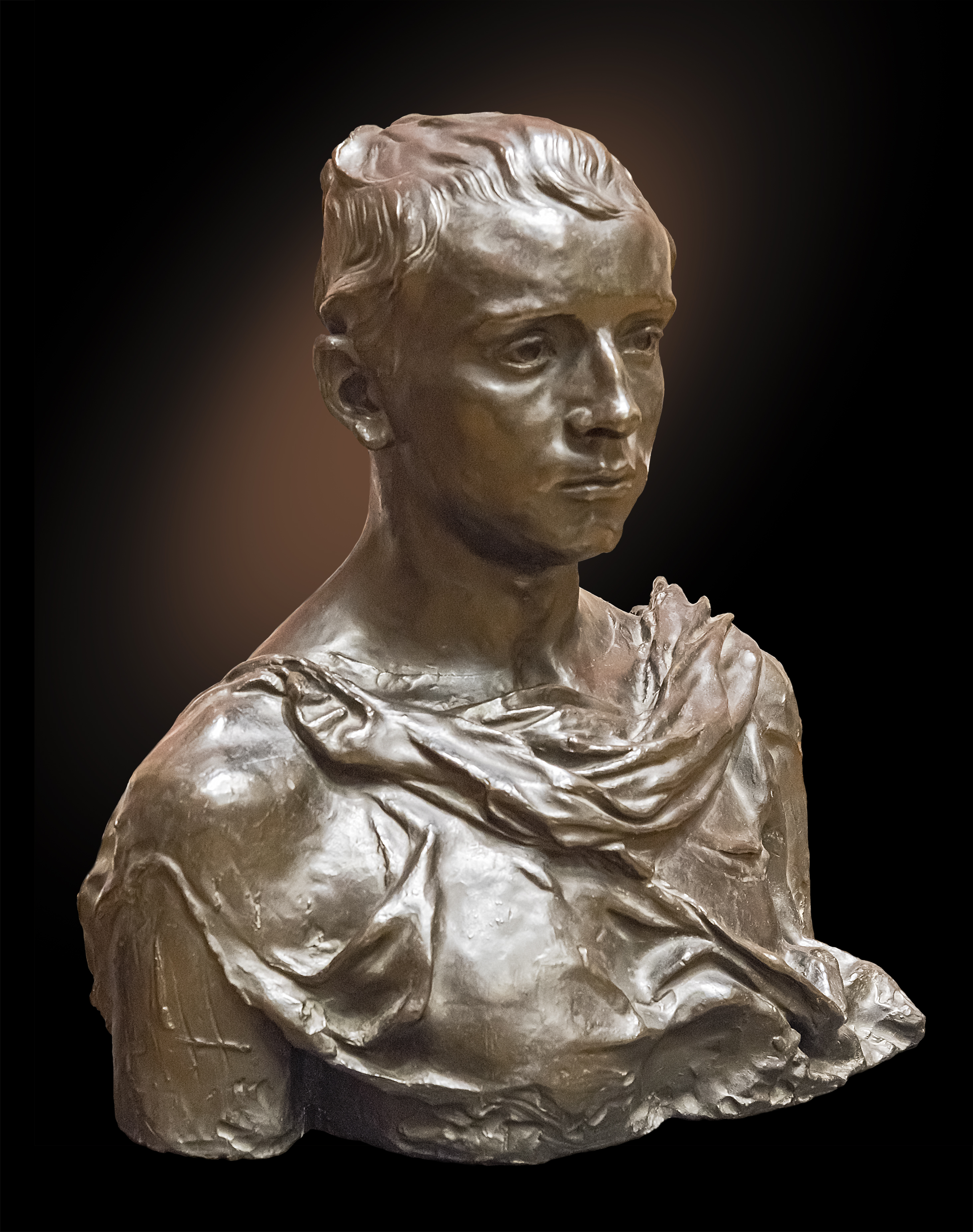
Paul Claudel aged sixteen by Camille Claudel, modeled in 1884 and cast in 1893, Musée des Augustins, Toulouse

Correspondence

- 1949 : Correspondance de Paul Claudel et André Gide (1899-1926)
- 1951 : Correspondance de Paul Claudel et André Suarès (1904-1938)
- 1952 : Correspondance de Paul Claudel with Gabriel Frizeau and Francis Jammes (1897-1938), accompagnée de lettres de Jacques Rivière
- 1961 : Correspondance Paul Claudel et Darius Milhaud (1912–1953)
- 1964 : Correspondance de Paul Claudel et Lugné-Poe (1910-1928). Claudel homme de théâtre
- 1966 : Correspondences avec Copeau, Dullin, Jouvet. Claudel homme de théâtre
- 1974 : Correspondance de Jean-Louis Barrault et Paul Claudel
- 1984 : Correspondance de Paul Claudel et Jacques Rivière (1907-1924)
- 1990 : Lettres de Paul Claudel à Élisabeth Sainte-Marie Perrin et à Audrey Parr
- 1995 : Correspondence diplomatique. Tokyo (1921-1927)
- 1995 : Correspondance de Paul Claudel et Gaston Gallimard (1911-1954)
- 1996: Paul Claudel, Jacques Madaule Connaissance et reconnaissance : Correspondence 1929-1954, DDB
- 1998 : Le Poète et la Bible, volume 1, 1910–1946, Gallimard, coll. « Blanche »
- 2002 : Le Poète et la Bible, volume 2, 1945–1955, Gallimard, coll. « Blanche »
- 2004 : Lettres de Paul Claudel à Jean Paulhan (1925-1954), Correspondence présentée et annotée par Catherine Mayaux, Berne : Paul Lang, 2004 ISBN 3-03910-452-7
- 2005 : Correspondance de Paul Claudel avec les ecclésiastiques de son temps. Volume I, Le sacrement du monde et l'intention de gloire, éditée par Dominique Millet-Gérard, Paris : Champion, coll. « Bibliothèque des correspondances, mémoires et journaux » n° 19, 2005, 655 p. ISBN 2-7453-1214-6.
- 2005 : Une Amitié perdue et retrouvée. Correspondance de Paul Claudel et Romain Rolland, édition établie, annotée et présentée par Gérald Antoine et Bernard Duchatelet, Paris : Gallimard, coll. « Les cahiers de la NRF », 2005, 479 p. ISBN 2-07-077557-7
