= Benno Besson =

Swiss theatre director and actor (1922–2006)

Benno Besson was a Swiss Theatre Director.

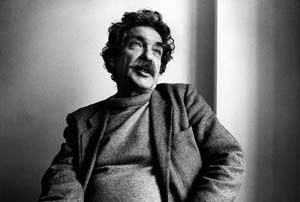
Benno Besson, 1983

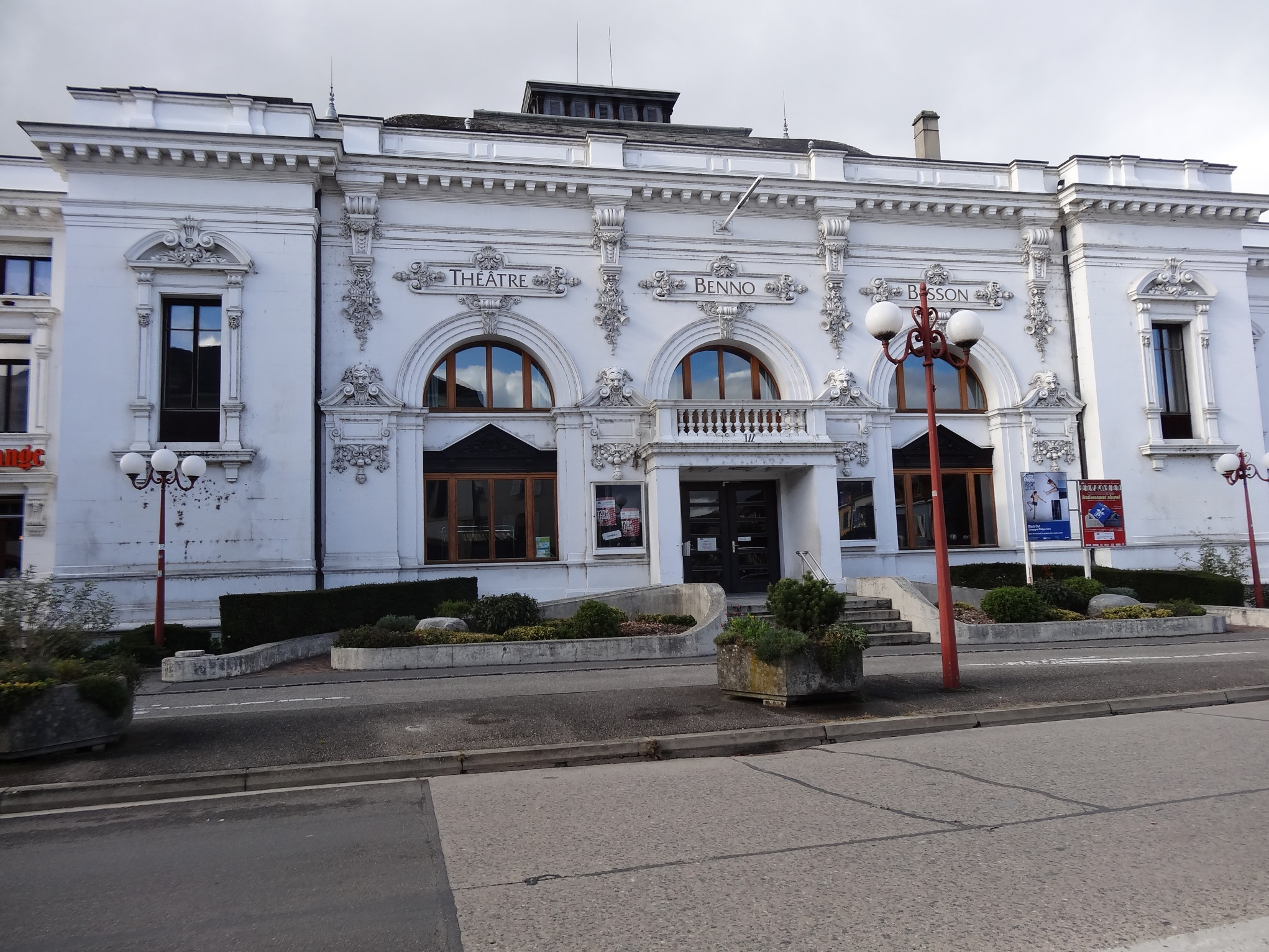
The Théâtre Benno Besson in Yverdon, named in his honour

Benno Besson (born René-Benjamin Besson; 4 November 1922 in Yverdon-les-Bains, Switzerland – 23 February 2006 in Berlin, Germany) was a theatre director.

Besson was the son of a teacher couple in French speaking Switzerland, Kanton Vaud. He was the youngest of their six children.

== Switzerland ==
Besson realised his first directing work while touring various plays with the Troupe des Ecoliers in Yverdon, Vaud. From 1942 to 1946, he studied Roman and English language and literature in Zurich. It was there that he first came across the name Bertolt Brecht in an antiquarian bookshop. Here in Zurich he had the opportunity to attend many plays by exiled German actors and the premiere of Brecht's works at the Schauspielhaus Zürich. He translated and adapted the spoken word poem 'The Three Soldiers' into French and toured it under the name 'La bataille de Kohlen' with his troupe in 1945. He took part in the tours organised in the German territories still occupied by France in 1947, under the aegis of the Office Général de Décentralisation du Théâtre and met its director Jean-Marie Serreau. This marked the beginning of years of collaboration, especially in the joint French translations of Brecht's works with Geneviève Serreau.

== Germany/GDR ==
Besson met Bertolt Brecht personally when the latter returned briefly from his Exile in the US to Zurich in November 1947. Besson then joined Brecht at his demand in September 1949 when Brecht went to develop his theatre in Berlin, the Berliner Ensemble. Besson works there as an actor, assistant director and director until 1958. In 1954 he opened the new house of the Berliner Ensemble on the Schiffbauerdamm with "Don Juan" in cooperation with Brecht.

After Brechts‘ death, however, the situation at the Berliner Ensemble changed naturally, the usual collaboration no longer worked without Brecht. Following serious conflicts Besson decided to leave.

Besson then worked at the Deutsches Theater where he had great success among others with "Der Frieden" (Aristophanes edited by Peter Hacks). and "Der Drachen" (Evgny Schwartz) which was one of his acquainted stagings, so that they travelled with Deutsches Theater all-around Europe and Asia (also in Japan). In this plays, he worked amongst others with the popular actors Fred Düren, Eberhard Esche and Ursula Karusseit.

Besson became chief play director (1971) and then Intendant (1974) at Volksbühne East-Berlin. There he continued to work with Heiner Müller. and other contemporary authors and stage directors like Christoph Hein, Manfred Karge, Matthias Langhoff, Fritz Marquardt. Among the many works performed at the Volksbühne were the "Spectacles" 1 and 2, theatre in all room at the same time...

== Western Europe ==
1978 Besson leaves Volksbühne and Berlin for different reasons such as problems with the play design of the theatre. After his first work at the Avignon Festival, he mainly wanted to continue working in his mother tongue. He so continues to work in Avignon and other European theatres and became 1982 director of the Comédie de Genève in French speaking Switzerland.

== Private life ==
Besson first spouse was Iva Formigoni. With the actress Sabine Thalbach he had a daughter, the actress Katharina Thalbach. From his second spouse, Imma Lūning he had two children, therof the stage director Philippe Besson. From his third spouse, Ursula Karusseit he had a son, the actor Pierre Besson. With his partner Coline Serreau he had two children, the singer and actress Madeleine Besson and his youngest son Nathanel Serreau.

== Theatre Productions ==
- 1952: Don Juan oder der steinerne Gast/Don Juan or The Stone Banquet (Molière/Brecht), Volkstheater Rostock
- 1952: Der Prozeß der Jeanne d'Arc zu Rouen 1431/The Trial of Joan of Arc at Rouen, 1431 (A. Seghers, B. Brecht, B. Besson) Berliner Ensemble
- 1953: Volpone oder der Fuchs/Volpone; Or the Fox (Ben Jonson), Scala Wien
- 1954: Don Juan (Molière/Brecht), Berliner Ensemble Berlin
- 1955: Pauken und Trompeten/Trumpets and Drums (Farquhar/Brecht), Berliner Ensemble Berlin
- 1956: Der gute Mensch von Sezuan/ The Good Person of Szechwan (Brecht), Volkstheater Rostock
- 1956: Die Tage der Commune/The Days of the Commune (Brecht), Städtisches Theater Karl-Marx-Stadt
- 1957: Der gute Mensch von Sezuan/The Good Person of Szechwan (Brecht), Berliner Ensemble Berlin
- 1958: Mann ist Mann/A Man's A Man (Brecht), Volkstheater Rostock
- 1959: Die Dreigroschenoper/The Threepenny Opera (Brecht), Volkstheater Rostock
- 1959: Die zwei edlen Herren von Verona/Two Gentlemen of Verona (Shakespeare), Frankfurt am Main
- 1960: Die Holländerbraut/The Dutch Bride (Erwin Stritmatter), Deutsches Theater Berlin
- 1961: Die heilige Johanna der Schlachthöfe/Saint Joan of the Stockyards (Brecht), Württ. Staatstheater Stuttgart
- 1961: Die heilige Johanna der Schlachthöfe/Saint Joan of the Stockyards (Brecht), Volkstheater Rostock
- 1962: Sainte Jeanne des Abbatoirs/Saint Joan of the Stockyards (Brecht), Théâtre Municipal de Lausanne
- 1962: Der Frieden/Peace (Aristophanes/Hacks), Deutsches Theater Berlin
- 1963: Die zwei edlen Herren von Verona/Two Gentlemen of Verona (Shakespeare), Deutsches Theater Berlin
- 1963: Tartuffe (Molière), Deutsches Theater Berlin
- 1964: Don Giovanni/Don Juan (Molière), Teatro Bellini, Palermo
- 1964: Die schöne Helena/The beautiful Helen (Offenbach/Hacks), Deutsches Theater Berlin
- 1965: Der Drache/The Dragon (Evgeny Schwartz), Deutsches Theater Berlin
- 1965: Moritz Tassow (Peter Hacks), Volksbühne Berlin
- 1967: Oedipus Tyrann/Oedipus Rex (Sophokles/Hölderlin/Heiner Müller), Deutsches Theater Berlin
- 1967: Ein Lorbaß (Horst Salomon), Deutsches Theater Berlin
- 1969: Turandot oder der Kongress der Weißwäscher/Turandot (Brecht), Schauspielhaus Zürich
- 1971: Der Arzt wider Willen/The Doctor in Spite of Himself (Molière), Volksbühne Berlin
- 1973: Das letzte Paradies/The last Paradise (Andre Müller), Volksbühne Berlin
- 1973: Margarethe von Aix/Margaret of Aix (Peter Hacks), Volksbühne Berlin
- 1975: Wie es euch gefällt/As you like it (Shakespeare), Volksbühne Berlin
- 1976: Comme il vous plaira/As you like it (Shakespeare), Théâtre de l’Est Parisien, Festival d’Avignon
- 1977: Die tragische Geschichte von Hamlet, Prinz von Dänemark/The Tragedy of Hamlet, Prince of Denmark (Shakespeare/ M.Langhoff/H.Müller), Volksbühne Berlin
- 1977: La tragique histoire d‘Hamlet, prince de Danemark/The Tragedy of Hamlet, Prince of Denmark (Shakespeare), Théâtre de l’Est Parisien, Festival d’Avignon
- 1978: Le cercle de craie/ The Caucasian Chalk Circle (B.Brecht/B.Besson/G. Serreau), Atelier théâtral de Louvain-la-Neuve, Théâtre National de Chaillot (Paris), Festival d’Avignon
- 1978: Edipo tiranno/Oedipus Rex (Sophokles/ Sanguinetti), Festival di Spoleto
- 1979: Hamlet (Shakespeare), in Swedish, Lila Teater Helsinki
- 1982: Der neue Menoza/The New Menoza (Jakob Michael Reinhold Lenz), Burgtheater Wien
- 1982: L’oiseau vert/The Green Bird (Carlo Gozzi/Benno Besson), Comédie de Genève, Geneva
- 1983: Hamlet (Shakespeare), Comédie de Genève, Geneva
- 1983: Hamlet (Shakespeare), Schauspielhaus Zürich
- 1984: Le sexe faible/The Weaker Sex (Gustave Flaubert), Comédie de Genève, Geneva
- 1985: Hamlet (Shakespeare), in Finnish, Lila Teater Helsinki
- 1986: Don Juan (Molière/B.Besson/H.Müller), Burgtheater Wien
- 1986: Lapin Lapin/Hare Hare (Coline Serreau), Co-Production Comédie de Genève and Théâtre de la Ville Paris
- 1987: La flûte enchantée/The Magic Flute (W.A.Mozart), Grand Théâtre Geneva
- 1988: Théâtre de verdure/Theatre of Greenery (Coline Serreau), Comédie de Genève, Geneva
- 1989: Jonas und sein Veteran/ (Max Frisch), Schauspielhaus Zürich
- 1989: Jonas et son vétéran (Max Frisch) Théâtre de Vidy Lausanne
- 1990: Mille francs de récompense/Thousand francs reward (Victor Hugo), Théâtre de Vidy Lausanne, Théâtre National de Bretagne Rennes, Théâtre National de Chaillot Paris
- 1991: Cœur ardent/Burning Heart (Alexander N. Ostrovski), Théâtre National de Bretagne Rennes und Théâtre de Vidy Lausanne
- 1991: Mille franchi di ricompensa/Thousand franco reward (Victor Hugo), Teatro di Genova, Genoa
- 1992: Hase Hase/Hare Hare (Coline Serreau), Schiller-Theater Berlin
- 1993: Quisaîtout et Grobêta (Coline Serreau), Théâtre National de Bretagne Rennes
- 1993: Tuttosà e Chebestia (Coline Serreau), Teatro di Genova, Genoa
- 1993: Weißalles und Dickedumm (Coline Serreau), Schiller-Theater Berlin
- 1994: Hamlet (Shakespeare), Teatro di Genova, Genoa
- 1996: Io/I (Eugène Labiche and Edouard Martin), Teatro di Genova/ eatro della Corte
- 1997: Les poubelles boys with L'école des maris (Molière), Théâtre Vidy Lausanne
- 1997: Le roi cerf/The King Stag (Carlo Gozzi), Théâtre d'Orléans, Co-production CADO and Comédie de Genève
- 1998: Die heilige Johanna der Schlachthöfe/Saint Joan of the Stockyards (B.Brecht), Schauspielhaus Zürich
- 2000: Don Juan (Molière), Kaupungin Teaterri Helsinki
- 2000: Il Tartufo/Tartuffe (Molière), Teatro di Genova, Genoa
- 2001: Le cercle de craie/The Caucasian Chalk Circle (B.Brecht), Théâtre de la Colline Paris
- 2001: L’amore delle tre melarance/The Love for the Three Oranges (Carlo Gozzi/Edoardo Sanguinetti) Teatro di Genoa, Teatro Malibran Venice
- 2002: Mangeront-ils?/ Will They eat? (Victor Hugo), Théâtre de Vidy Lausanne
- 2003: Il cerchio di gesso/The Caucasian Chalk Circle (B.Brecht), Teatro di Genova, Genoa

== Filmography ==
- Pauken und Trompeten, TV 1955
- Benno Besson, Der fremde Freund - L’ami étranger. (Documentary film by Philippe Macasdar), 1992.
- Benno Besson (Documentary film) http://www.plansfixes.ch/films/benno-besson, 2002.
- https://www.rts.ch/archives/grands-formats/13425509-benno-besson-un-theatre-politique-et-joyeux.html#chap02
- https://www.rts.ch/archives/tv/culture/plateau-libre/3446503-benno-besson.html
- https://www.rts.ch/play/tv/entracte/video/loiseau-vert?urn=urn:rts:video:13471846
