= Geneviève Serreau =

French actress (1915–1981)

- Born: August 15, 1915; Oléron, France
- Died: October 2, 1981 (aged 66)
- Occupations: Stage actress, playwright
- Partner: Jean-Marie Serreau
- Children: Coline Serreau

Geneviève Serreau (15 August 1915 in Oléron – 2 October 1981) was a 20th-century French stage actress and playwright.

Geneviève Serreau made her debut as a comedian before she devoted herself with Benno Besson to the translation into French of several works by German playwright Bertolt Brecht, including Mother Courage and Her Children. She also authored Histoire du nouveau théâtre. She realized numerous mises en scène and stage adaptations, including that of The Sea Wall by Marguerite Duras.

Geneviève Serreau was married to theatre director Jean-Marie Serreau with whom she had three children: Dominique Serreau, Coline Serreau and Nicolas Serreau.

== Plays ==
Serreau wrote the following plays from 1946 to 1971:

- 1946: Le Marchand d'étoiles, directed by Jean-Marie Serreau, Théâtre des Bouffes du Nord
- 1955: Le soldat Bourquin
- 1959: Le fondateur
- 1960: The Sea Wall by Marguerite Duras, directed by Jean-Marie Serreau, Studio des Champs-Élysées
- 1962: Ressac
- 1968: Bertolt Brecht dramaturge
- 1971: L'Escalier de Silas, directed by Michel Peyrelon, Théâtre du Vieux-Colombier
