= Azaïs =

Azaïs is a French surname (sometimes Anglicised as Azais). Notable people with the surname include:

- Kévin Azaïs, French actor
- Pierre Hyacinthe Azaïs (1766–1845), French philosopher
- Paul Azaïs (1903–1974), French film actor

== See also ==
- Azaïs (film), a 1931 film directed by René Hervil
