= La Dispute (play) =

1747 play written by Pierre de Marivaux

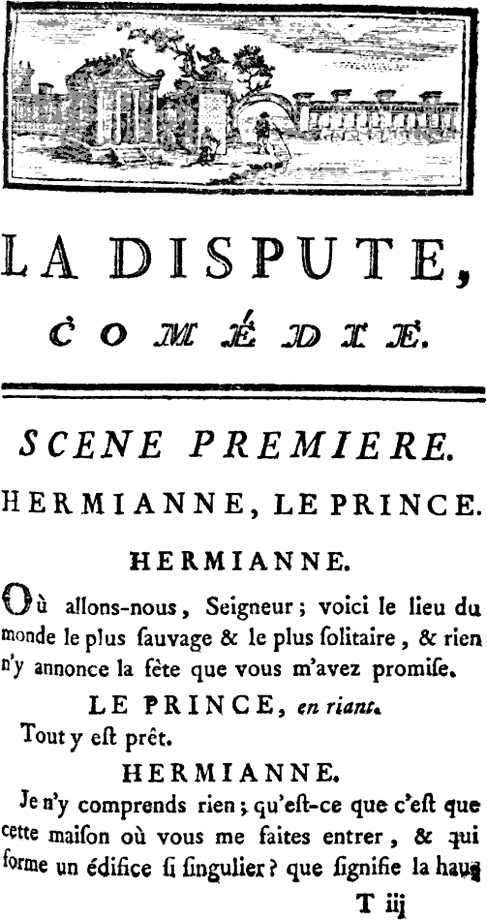
- Front page of 1744 Edition of La Dispute
- Original language: French
- Written by: Pierre de Marivaux
- Characters: Hermianne; Prince; Mesrou; Carise; Egle; Azor; Adine; Mesrin; Meslis; Dina; Following the Prince
- Genre: Comedy

Premiere
- Date: 19 October 1744
- Place: Hôtel de Bourgogne, Paris, France

La Dispute is a prose comedy written by Pierre de Marivaux, shown for the first time on 19 October 1744 by the Théâtre-Italien in the Hôtel de Bourgogne. The story involves four orphans (two boys and two girls) who have been raised in isolation, from the world and from each other. An aristocrat releases four human guinea pigs into a sinister Garden of Eden to cause them to consider the question of whether man or woman is more faithful.

Adaptations have been created from 1972 and onward in various forms.

== Reception ==
For the 2013 adaptation, editor for The New York Times Sylviane Gold wrote: "La Dispute opens with Prince and Hermiane, as a pair of exquisitely bewigged, bejeweled aristocrats, discussing with typical Marivaux finesse a lover’s question, one that would appear to have no answer. Who committed the first infidelity, mankind or womankind? But since we’re in Enlightenment France, there’s an app for that: the Prince tells his lady that when the same debate arose in his father’s court nearly 20 years earlier, a scientific experiment was devised to provide incontrovertible evidence as to who started the war between the sexes.

In a variation on one of the 18th century’s favorite themes, that of "The Wild Child," two newborn boys, Azor and Mesrin, and two newborn girls, Églé and Adine, were removed to a distant, custom-built, high-walled enclosure. There, each was raised, and taught French, naturally, in total isolation by two faithful old servants, Mesrou and Carise. Today, the arrival of the aristocrats signals the culmination of the experiment. They will observe unseen as the now adolescent children, simply dressed in pure white, are released into one another’s company for the very first time, blank slates who will discover, or perhaps invent, love, sex and jealousy for themselves. And for the sake of science."

== In popular culture ==
- The band La Dispute named themselves after the play. The band's lead singer, Jordan Dreyer, watched the play in high school and felt parallels between the work and the music he was writing at the time.
