= Théâtre National de Bretagne =

Theatre company in Rennes, France

Théâtre national de Bretagne
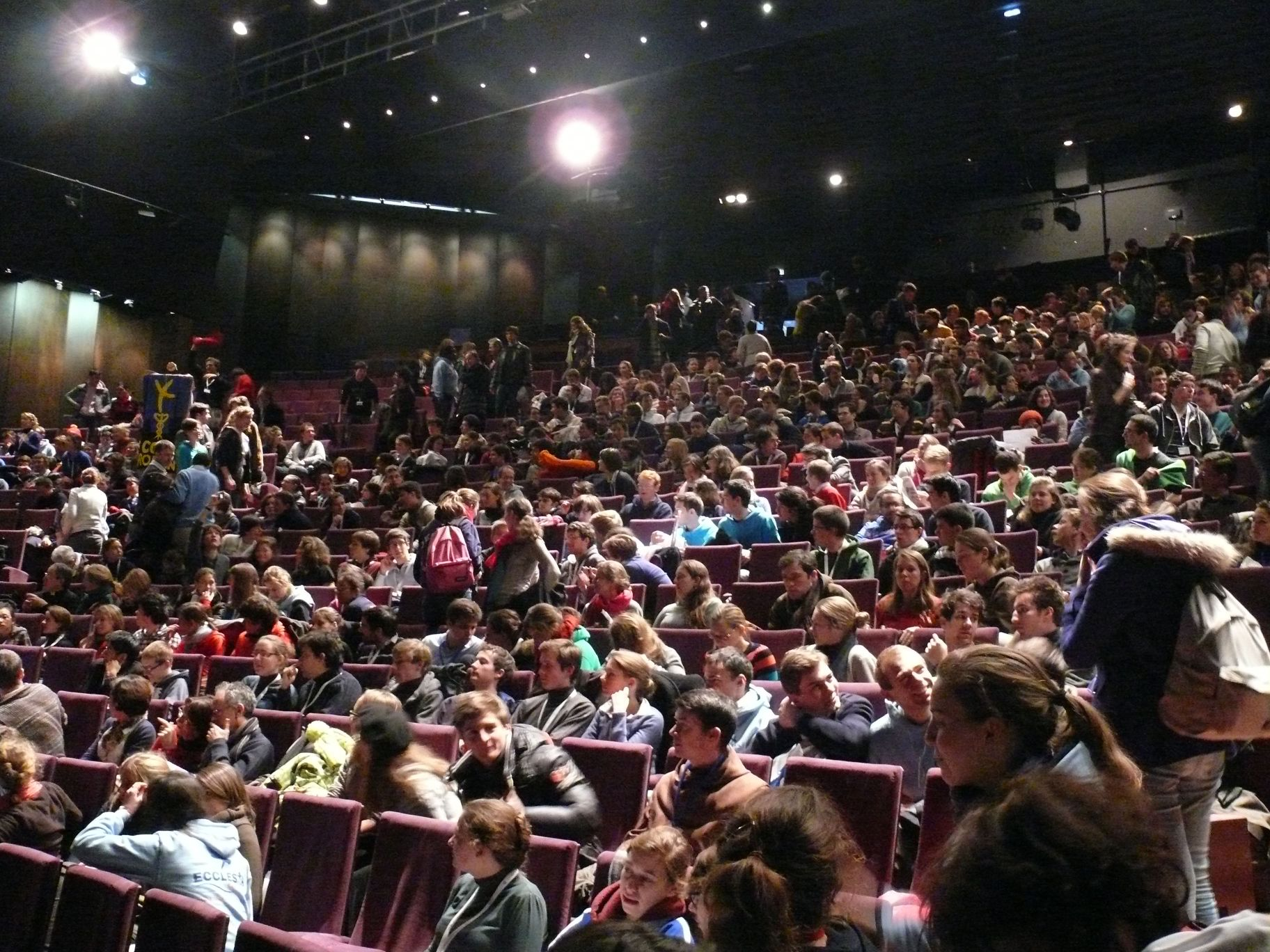
- Jean Vilar room

- Location in France
- Address: Rennes
- Coordinates: 48.10805556°N 1.6725°W
- Capacity: 2 126 (5 rooms)

Construction
- Opened: 1990
- Reopened: 2008

Website
- http://www.t-n-b.fr

The Théâtre national de Bretagne (French pronunciation: [teɑtʁ nɑsjɔnal də bʁətaɲ]; "National Theater of Brittany"; abbr. TNB) is a cultural institution established in Rennes in 1990 by combining the Centre dramatique de l'Ouest and the Maison de la Culture of Rennes. For some time it was called the "Great Eight" due to the shape of its building. Its mission is centered on creation, dissemination and training at regional, national and international levels. In 2002 it attained the status of European center of dance and theater production. Its director is Arthur Nauzyciel. He also runs the school along with French actor Laurent Poitrenaux. Every year in November the TNB organizes a festival called "Le Festival du TNB" and formerly called "Mettre en scène" (staging).

== Architecture ==
The theater is housed in the Maison de la Culture (Culture House), built in 1968 by the architects Jacques Carlu, Michel Joly and Patrick Coue. It reopened in February 2008 after three years of renovation work entrusted to the architect Antoine Stinco. After the renovation the building now has three theaters and two cinemas.

The Jean Vilar room is the largest of the theaters with 924-seats. The Jean-Marie Serreau room has 260 seats. In the basement, a third 120-seat venue, the Guy Parigot room, is home to rehearsals of young actors of the theater school of SBT, and is sometimes open to the public festivals. On the third floor two rooms are dedicated to art cinema: a larger one with 480 seats, and a smaller one with 92 seats. On the first floor there is also a bar restaurant, "the intermission", that seats up to 250 people.

== History ==
The genesis of the Théâtre national de Bretagne dates back to 1940, when Georges Goubert and Guy Parigot founded a company of young actors. In 1948, as winner of first prize in the contest of young companies, the company went on tour through Brittany. Based on a report on the tour, Hubert Gignoux proposed a project to create a national drama center (CDN) in Brittany to Jeanne Laurent. With a grant of 8,000,000 francs from the Ministry of Education, and 2,000,000 from the city of Rennes, the Centre dramatique de l'Ouest (Drama Centre of the West) was born on 2 November 1949, the fourth CDN to emerge after the Centre dramatique de l'Est in 1946, the Comédie de Saint-Étienne in 1947 and the Grenier de Toulouse in 1949.

The Centre dramatique de l'Ouest opened with Un chapeau de paille d'Italie (a straw hat from Italy) by Labiche, and was directed by Hubert Gignoux until 1957. It then began a co-management under Georges Goubert and Guy Parigot with the name Comédie de l'Ouest.

In 1968 the Maison de la Culture de Rennes was created, and soon after came under common management with the Drama Centre until 31 December 1973. Between 1974 and 1980 the director of the Maison de la Culture de Rennes was Chérif Khaznadar, who developed theatrical actions in parallel. From 1 January 1975, Guy Parigot was the sole director of the Comédie de l’Ouest, renamed Théâtre du Bout du Monde" (Theater of the World's End). It is hosted in late 1979 in the new theater Parcheminerie. Taking the name of Comedy of Rennes, the company found in 1981 a dual presidency, Dominique Quehec joining Guy Parigot, while Jean-Pierre Valentin became head of the House of Culture in 1982. In 1990 it was decided to merge the House of Culture and the Drama Centre and the Théâtre national de Bretagne was born, with its management entrusted to Emmanuel Véricourt.

== Organization ==
With a status of "Société d'économie mixte", the theater has an annual budget of 11 million euros, with 3.1 million from the state, 2.9 million from the city of Rennes, and 3 million from its own revenue. In 2005 it hosted 95,000 spectators with 10,000 subscribers. The audience is fairly young, with an average age of 26.
