= Théâtre de Gennevilliers =

French theatre

Coordinates: 48.9143°N 2.2998°E

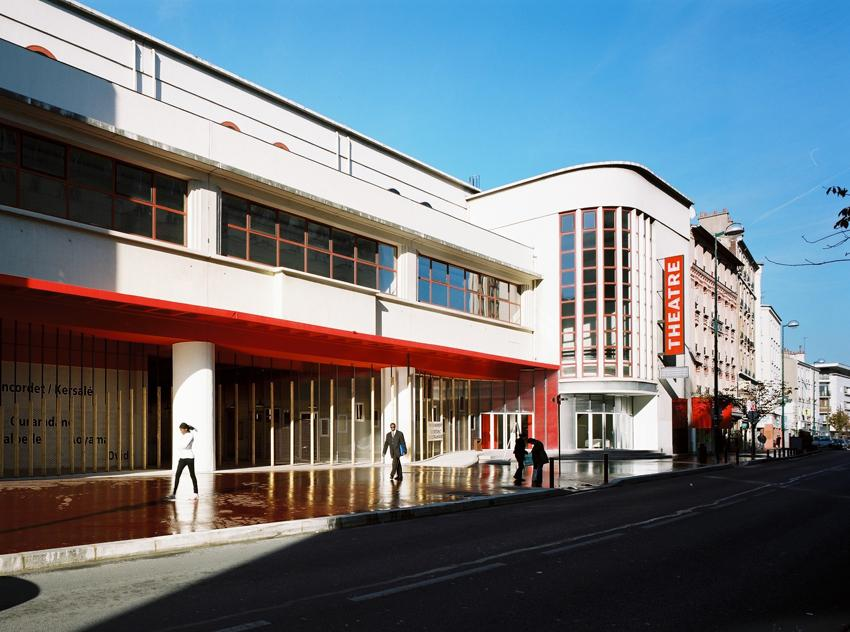
The theater from the outside

The théâtre de Gennevilliers is a French national dramatic center inaugurated on 22 January 1983, 19 years after the arrival of Bernard Sobel at Gennevilliers in the Hauts-de-Seine departement.

In 2007, Bernard Sobel is succeeded by Pascal Rambert as director of the place.
