= Martin Graff =

French writer and cabaretist (1944–2021)

- Born: 22 June 1944; Munster, France
- Died: 4 August 2021 (aged 77); Soultzeren, France
- Occupations: Writer, cabaretist

Martin Graff (22 June 1944 – 4 August 2021) was a French pastor, writer, screenwriter, and cabaretist.

== Biography ==
After his studies in Protestant theology, he worked for three years as a pastor in Strasbourg and Sarreguemines. He then started a career as a journalist and essayist in German media. He wrote and published in German and French for radio, television, theatre, and cabarets.

Martin Graff died in Soultzeren on 4 August 2021, at the age of 77.

== Publications ==
- Vertiges (1984)
- L'Allemagne au mois d'août (1985)
- Der Joker und der Schmetterling (1987)
- Mange ta choucroute et tais-toi (1988)
- Le pape est fou (1989)
- Zéro partout : pamphlet franco-allemand (1993)
- Contes de Noël à rêver debout (1994)
- Nous sommes tous des Alsakons, mais ne le répétez à personne (1995)
- Von Liebe keine Spur. Das Elsass und die Deutschen (1996)
- Le réveil du Danube : géopolitique vagabonde de l'Europe (1998)
- Voyage au jardin des frontières (2000)
- Invitation à quitter la France (2001)
- Roberto et Fabiola (2002)
- Champagner für alle (2004)
- Le Vagabond des frontières (2010)
- Grenzvagabund (2010)
- Leben wie Gott im Elsass. Deutsche Fantasien (2012)
- Weihnachten. Geschichten
- Der lutherische Urknall. die Franzosen und die Deutschen, Morstadt, Kehl am Rhein
- Comme l'Allemagne ? : le big bang luthérien
