= Marcel Maréchal =

French actor (1937–2020)

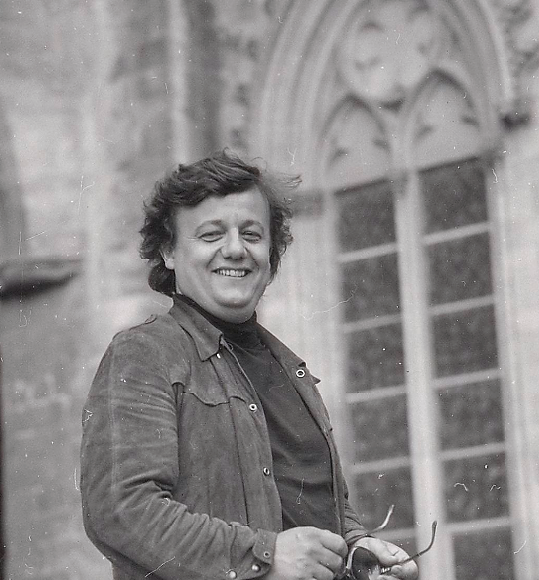
- Maréchal in 1973
- Born: 25 December 1937; Lyon, France
- Died: 11 June 2020 (aged 82); Paris, France
- Occupations: Actor; Director

Marcel Maréchal (25 December 1937 – 11 June 2020) was a French actor, writer, and director.

== Biography ==
Since 1958, Maréchal had a successful acting career. That year, he founded the Théâtre du Cothurne in Lyon. Other theatres he worked at included the Théâtre du Huitième, the Théâtre du Gymnase, Théâtre National de la Criée, Théâtre du Rond-Point, and Trétaux de France.

In 2001, Maréchal founded the Festival Théâtral de Figeac. Throughout his career, he dedicated himself to contemporary playwrights such as Jacques Audiberti, Jean Vauthier, and Louis Guilloux. He was invited to the Festival d'Avignon on several occasions.

Marcel Maréchal died on 11 June 2020 in Paris at the age of 82.

== Filmography ==
=== Cinema ===
- Trotsky (1967)
- I as in Icarus (1979) - Rivoli, un cobaye
- Instinct de femme (1981) - Pierre, le mari de Marthe
- Il y a maldonne (1988) - William
- Simple mortel (1991) - L'homme du parking
- Fanfan (1993) - Le père de Fanfan
- Le Plus Beau Pays du monde (1999) - Roland, commissaire aux affaires juives

=== Television ===
- Fracasse (1974, TV Movie) - Professeur
- La Belle Époque (1979, TV Movie) - Gustave Hervé
- Cinéma 16 (1980) - Teddy Marly
- C'améra une première (1981) - Eole Epifanio
- Le Fleuve rouge (1981, TV Movie) - Le prof. Roland / L'homme à la canne / Zaganski / Stanislavski / Staline
- Nous te mari-e-rons (1981, TV Movie) - Jeannot
- Life of Galileo (1982) - Galilée
- Lettres d'une mère à son fils (1984, TV Short) - Jouhandeau
- Le Cœur du voyage (1984, TV Movie) - Le commandant
- Julien Fontanes, magistrat (1987) - Arnaud Surruguet
- Au nom du peuple français (1988) - Louis XVI
- Navarro (1991)
- L'histoire du samedi (1996) - Serge
- Commandant Nerval: À qui profite le crime ? (1996) - Valadol
- Meurtres sans risques (1998, TV Movie) - Marcel Gallais
- Nestor Burma : La Plus Noble Conquête de Nestor (1998) - Godefroy
- La femme du boulanger (1999, TV Movie) - Le marquis Castan de Venelles
- La Trilogie Marseillaise (2000, TV Movie) - Le docteur (final film role)

== Publications ==
- La Mise en théâtre (1974)
- Une anémone pour Guignol (1975)
- Les Trois Mousquetaires (1982)
- Approches de "la Vie de Galilée" de Bertolt Brecht (1982)
- Conversation avec Marcel Maréchal (1983)
- L'Arbre de mai (1984)
- Capitaine Fracasse (1987)
- Un colossal enfant (1991)
- Rhum-Limonade (1995)
- Saltimbanque (2004)
- La Très Mirifique Épopée Rabelais (2005)

== Awards ==
- Prix du Syndicat de la critique for Best Comedian (1969)
- Molière Award director nomination for Mr Puntila and his Man Matti (1992)
- Molière Award actor nomination for Mr Puntila and his Man Matti (1992)
