= Jean-Marie Serreau =

French actor

- Born: 28 April 1915; Poitiers
- Died: 22 May 1973 (aged 58); Paris
- Occupation(s): Comedian; Theatre director
- Spouse: Geneviève Serreau

Jean-Marie Serreau (French pronunciation: [ʒɑ̃ maʁi seʁo]; 28 April 1915 – 22 May 1973) was a 20th-century French actor, theatre director and a former student of Charles Dullin.

Serreau directed the Théâtre de Babylone in Paris during the 1950s-1960s and established the Théâtre de la Tempête at La Cartoucherie in Vincennes in 1970. He created works by avant gardist playwrights such as Samuel Beckett, Jean Genet and Eugène Ionesco, as well as works by Kateb Yacine and Aimé Césaire.

Married to Geneviève Serreau, herself an author and theatre director, he was Dominique Serreau's, Coline Serreau's and Nicolas Serreau's father.

== Comedies ==
- 1938: La Jalousie du barbouillé by Molière, directed by Jean-Marie Serreau, tour in Béarn
- 1943: Monsieur de Pourceaugnac by Molière, directed by Charles Dullin, Théâtre de la Cité (extra)
- 1945: Le Faiseur by Honoré de Balzac, directed by Charles Dullin, Théâtre de la Cité
- 1946: La Femme silencieuse by Marcel Achard after Ben Jonson, directed by Jean-Marie Serreau, tour in Germany
- 1947: The Trial by Franz Kafka, adaptation André Gide, directed by Jean-Louis Barrault, Théâtre Marigny
- 1947: Androcles and the Lion by George Bernard Shaw, directed by Christine Tsingos, Théâtre de la Gaîté-Montparnasse
- 1948: Le Portefeuille by Octave Mirbeau, directed by Christine Tsingos, Théâtre de la Gaîté-Montparnasse
- 1949: George Dandin by Molière, directed by Jean-Marie Serreau et François Vibert, tours in France and West-Germany, M de Sottenville
- 1949: Le Bossu by Paul Féval and Auguste Anicet-Bourgeois, directed by Jean-Louis Barrault, Théâtre Marigny
- 1950: The Exception and the Rule by Bertolt Brecht, directed by Jean-Marie Serreau, Théâtre de Poche Montparnasse
- 1950: Le Gardien du tombeau by Franz Kafka, directed by Jean-Marie Serreau, Poche Montparnasse
- 1952: La Jarre by Luigi Pirandello, directed by Jacques Mauclair, Théâtre de Babylone
- 1952: Spartacus by Max Aldebert, directed by Jean-Marie Serreau, Théâtre de Babylone
- 1952: Méfie-toi, Giacomino by Luigi Pirandello, directed by Jacques Mauclair, Théâtre de Babylone
- 1952: Cecè by Luigi Pirandello, directed by Jacques Mauclair, Théâtre de Babylone
- 1952: La Maison brûlée by August Strindberg, directed by Frank Sundström, Théâtre de Babylone
- 1953: Si Camille me voyait by Roland Dubillard, directed by Jean-Marie Serreau, Théâtre de Babylone
- 1953: Tous contre tous by Arthur Adamov, directed by Jean-Marie Serreau, Théâtre de Babylone
- 1954: Bellavita by Luigi Pirandello, directed by Jean-Marie Serreau, Théâtre Marigny
- 1954: Man Equals Man by Bertolt Brecht, directed by Jean-Marie Serreau, Théâtre des Célestins, Théâtre de l'Œuvre
- 1956: Chaud et froid by Fernand Crommelynck, directed by the author, Théâtre de l'Œuvre
- 1956: Le Paria by August Strindberg, directed by Michel Etcheverry, Théâtre de l'Œuvre
- 1956: The Lower Depths by Maxim Gorky, directed by Sacha Pitoëff, Théâtre de l'Œuvre
- 1958: Lorsque cinq ans seront passés by Federico García Lorca, directed by Guy Suarès, Théâtre Récamier
- 1959: The Killer by Eugène Ionesco, directed by José Quaglio, Théâtre Récamier
- 1960: Un barrage contre le Pacifique de Marguerite Duras, adaptation Geneviève Serreau, directed by Jean-Marie Serreau, Studio des Champs-Élysées
- 1960: Biedermann et les incendiaires by Max Frisch, directed by Jean-Marie Serreau, Théâtre de Lutèce
- 1961: Amédée, or How to Get Rid of It by Eugène Ionesco, directed by Jean-Marie Serreau, Théâtre de l'Odéon
- 1962: The Picture by Eugène Ionesco, directed by Jean-Marie Serreau, Théâtre de l'Œuvre
- 1962: L'avenir est dans les œufs ou il faut de tout pour faire un monde by Eugène Ionesco, directed by Jean-Marie Serreau, Théâtre de la Gaîté-Montparnasse
- 1962: The Picture by Eugène Ionesco, directed by Jean-Marie Serreau, Théâtre de l'Œuvre
- 1962: Biedermann et les incendiaires by Max Frisch, directed by Jean-Marie Serreau, Théâtre Récamier
- 1963: L'avenir est dans les œufs ou il faut de tout pour faire un monde by Eugène Ionesco, directed by Jean-Marie Serreau, Théâtre de l'Ambigu
- 1963: Amédée, or How to Get Rid of It by Eugène Ionesco, directed by Jean-Marie Serreau, Théâtre de l'Ambigu
- 1963: La Femme sauvage ou Le Cadavre encerclé by Kateb Yacine, directed by Jean-Marie Serreau, Théâtre Récamier
- 1963: Si Camille n'était conté by Roland Dubillard, directed by Jean-Marie Serreau, Théâtre de Lutèce
- 1965: La Tragédie du roi Christophe by Aimé Césaire, directed by Jean-Marie Serreau, Odéon
- 1966: Eris de Lee Falk, directed by Georges Vitaly, Théâtre La Bruyère
- 1966: Mêlées et démêlées by Eugène Ionesco, directed by Georges Vitaly, Théâtre La Bruyère
- 1967: Une saison au Congo by Aimé Césaire, directed by Jean-Marie Serreau, Théâtre de l'Est parisien
- 1970: The Death of Bessie Smith by Edward Albee, directed by Jean-Marie Serreau

== Films ==
- 1938: L’Impromptu de Barbe Bleu by Pierre Barbier, tour in Béarn
- 1938: La Jalousie du barbouillé by Molière, tour in Béarn
- 1946: Le Marchand d'étoiles by Geneviève Serreau, Théâtre des Bouffes du Nord
- 1946: La Femme silencieuse by Marcel Achard after Ben Jonson, tour in West-Germany
- 1947: Farce enfantine de la tête du Dragon by Ramón María del Valle-Inclán, tour
- 1947: The Exception and the Rule by Bertolt Brecht, Théâtre des Noctambules
- 1948: L'Auberge Pleine by Jean Variot, tour
- 1948: Le Paquebot Tenacity by Charles Vildrac, tour
- 1949: George Dandin by Molière, with François Vibert, setting François Ganeau, tours in France and West-Germany
- 1950: The Exception and the Rule by Bertolt Brecht, Poche Montparnasse
- 1950: Le Gardien du tombeau by Franz Kafka, Poche Montparnasse
- 1950: Le Roi Cerf by Carlo Gozzi, tour
- 1950: La Grande et la Petite Manœuvre by Arthur Adamov, Théâtre des Noctambules
- 1952: Spartacus by Max Aldebert, Théâtre de Babylone
- 1952: La Maison brûlée by August Strindberg, Théâtre de Babylone
- 1953: Tous contre tous by Arthur Adamov, Théâtre de Babylone
- 1953: La Rose des vents by Charles Spaak, Théâtre de Babylone
- 1953: L'Incendie à l'Opéra by Georges Kaiser, Théâtre de Babylone
- 1953: Si Camille me voyait by Roland Dubillard, Théâtre de Babylone
- 1954: Bellavita by Luigi Pirandello, Théâtre Marigny
- 1954: Amédée, or How to Get Rid of It by Eugène Ionesco, Théâtre de Babylone
- 1954: Man Equals Man by Bertolt Brecht, Théâtre des Célestins, Théâtre de l'Œuvre
- 1955: An Ideal Husband by Oscar Wilde, Théâtre de l'Œuvre
- 1956: Hommage à Brecht by Geneviève Serreau and Antoine Vitez, Théâtre de l'Alliance française
- 1957: Amédée, or How to Get Rid of It by Eugène Ionesco, Théâtre de l'Alliance française
- 1957: Les Coréens by Michel Vinaver, Théâtre de l'Alliance française
- 1958: Le Cadavre encerclé by Kateb Yacine, Théâtre de Lutèce
- 1959: Pique-nique en campagne by Fernando Arrabal, Théâtre de Lutèce
- 1960: Un barrage contre le Pacifique by Marguerite Duras, adaptation Geneviève Serreau, Studio des Champs-Élysées
- 1960: Hommage à Paul Éluard, Théâtre de l'Ambigu
- 1960: Biedermann et les incendiaires by Max Frisch, Théâtre de Lutèce
- 1961: La Rouille by Carlos Semprún Maura, Théâtre de l'Alliance française
- 1961: The Maids by Jean Genet, Théâtre de l'Odéon
- 1961: Amédée, or How to Get Rid of It by Eugène Ionesco, Théâtre de l'Odéon
- 1962: Tilt by Philippe Curval, Théâtre Récamier
- 1962: Gilda appelle Mae-West by Michel Parent, 9th Festival des Nuits de Bourgogne Dijon
- 1962: The Picture by Eugène Ionesco, Théâtre de l'Œuvre, Théâtre de la Gaîté-Montparnasse
- 1962: The Maids by Jean Genet, Théâtre de l'Œuvre
- 1962: Amédée, or How to Get Rid of It by Eugène Ionesco, Théâtre de la Gaîté-Montparnasse
- 1962: L'avenir est dans les œufs ou il faut de tout pour faire un monde by Eugène Ionesco, Théâtre de la Gaîté-Montparnasse
- 1962: The Picture by Eugène Ionesco, Théâtre de l'Œuvre
- 1962: Amédée, or How to Get Rid of It by Eugène Ionesco, Théâtre de l'Ambigu
- 1962: Biedermann et les incendiaires by Max Frisch, Théâtre Récamier
- 1963: La Femme sauvage ou Le Cadavre encerclé by Kateb Yacine, Théâtre Récamier
- 1963: Si Camille n'était conté by Roland Dubillard, Théâtre de Lutèce
- 1964: Comédie by Samuel Beckett, Théâtre du Pavillon de Marsan
- 1965: La Tragédie du roi Christophe by Aimé Césaire, Odéon
- 1966: Comédie by Samuel Beckett, Théâtre de l'Odéon
- 1966: La Soif et la faim by Eugène Ionesco, Comédie-Française
- 1966: Va et vient by Samuel Beckett, Odéon
- 1967: Les ancêtres redoublent de férocité de Kateb Yacine, TNP Théâtre de Chaillot
- 1967: Une saison au Congo by Aimé Césaire, La Fenice, Théâtre de l'Est parisien
- 1968: L'Otage by Paul Claudel, Comédie-Française
- 1968: Les Rosenberg ne doivent pas mourir by Alain Decaux, Tréteaux de France
- 1968: Drôle de baraque by Adrienne Kennedy, Odéon
- 1968: Uhuru after Aimé Césaire and Kateb Yacine, Théâtre de l'Hôtel de Ville du Havre
- 1968: Arc-en-ciel pour l'Occident chrétien de René Depestre, Théâtre de la Cité internationale
- 1968: Les Rosenberg ne doivent pas mourir by Alain Decaux, Tréteaux de France, 1969: Théâtre de la Porte-Saint-Martin
- 1969: Comédie by Samuel Beckett, Théâtre de Poche Montparnasse
- 1969: Le Pain dur by Paul Claudel, Comédie-Française
- 1969: Une Tempête by Aimé Césaire after William Shakespeare, Théâtre de l'Ouest parisien, Théâtre de la Cité internationale
- 1970: The Death of Bessie Smith by Edward Albee, Théâtre du Midi
- 1971: Amédée, or How to Get Rid of It by Eugène Ionesco, Poche Montparnasse
- 1971: Béatrice du Congo by Bernard Dadié, Festival d'Avignon
- 1972: Le Printemps des bonnets rouges by Paol Keineg, Théâtre de la Tempête
