= Bernard Sobel =

American dramatist

- Born: 1887; Attica, Indiana
- Died: 1964 (aged 76–77); New York City
- Occupations: Author, publicist
- Writing career
- Genre: Drama

Bernard Sobel (1887–1964) was an American playwright, a drama critic for the New York Daily Mirror, an author of a number of books on theatre and theatre history, and a publicist.

== Career ==
Among his clients were Florenz Ziegfeld, Charles Dillingham, A. L. Erlanger, and Lee, Sam, and Jacob Shubert.

A collection of Bernard Sobel's papers from 1923–1962 is in the possession of the Wisconsin Center for Film and Theater Research of the University of Wisconsin–Madison.

He was born in Attica, Indiana and died in New York City.

== Select works ==
=== Plays ===
- Jennie Knows (1913)
- Mrs. Bompton's Dinner Party (1913)
- There's Always A Reason (1913)

=== Articles ===
- Sobel, Bernard (1929), "The Language Of The Theatre", The Bookman: A Review of Books and Life, 69, New York: Dodd, Mead and Company, OCLC 228771241

=== Books ===
- Sobel, Bernard (1931), Burleycue; An Underground History of Burlesque Days, New York: Farrar & Rinehart, OCLC 1808911
- Sobel, Bernard (1933), The Indiscret Girl, New York: Grosset & Dunlap, OCLC 24040918
- Sobel, Bernard (1940), The Theatre Handbook and Digest of Plays, New York: Crown Publishers, OCLC 9596386
- Sobel, Bernard (1953), Broadway Heartbeat: Memoirs of a Press Agent, New York: Hermitage House, OCLC 1514676
- Sobel, Bernard (1956), A Pictorial History of Burlesque, New York: G. P. Putnam's Sons, OCLC 265486
- Sobel, Bernard (1961), A Pictorial History of Vaudeville, New York: Citadel Press, OCLC 300831
- Sobel, Bernard (1959), The New Theatre Handbook and Digest of Plays, New York: Crown Publishers, OCLC 297270487
