= Théâtre du Rond-Point =

Theatre in Paris, France

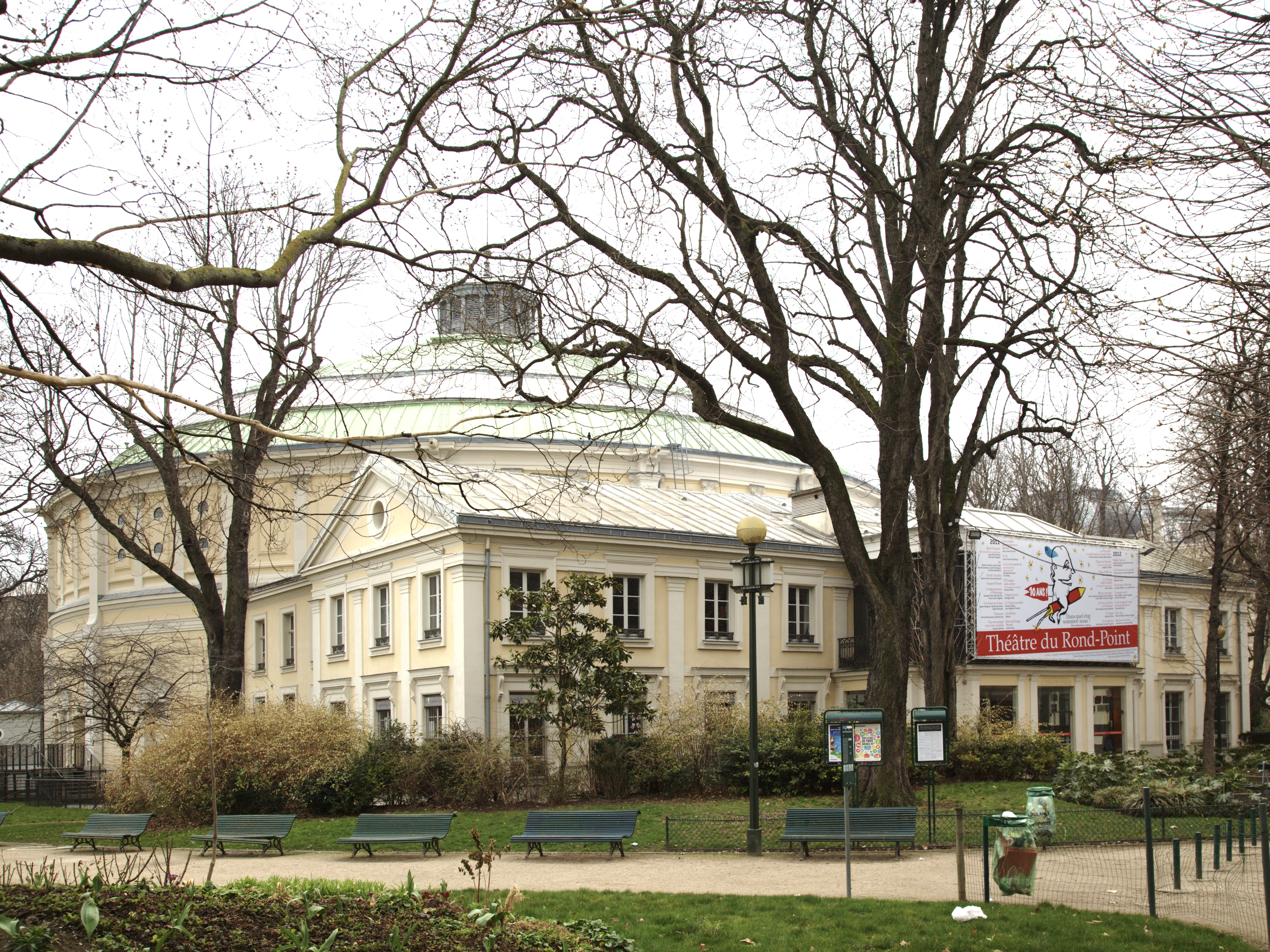
- Interactive map of Théâtre du Rond-Point
- Address: France
- Coordinates: 48°52′04″N 2°18′39″E
- Owner: Administration of Paris
- Type: Theatre

Website
- Official website

The Théâtre du Rond-Point (French pronunciation: [teɑtʁ dy ʁɔ̃ pwɛ̃]) is a theatre in Paris, located at 2bis avenue Franklin-D.-Roosevelt, 8th arrondissement.

== History ==
The theatre began with an 1838 project of architect Jacques Ignace Hittorff for a rotunda in the Champs Elysees. Inaugurated in 1839, this structure was integrated with other Hittorff buildings for the Exposition Universelle (1855) and destroyed the following year. A new replacement panorama, Le Panorama National, was designed by architect Gabriel Davioud at the corner of the Avenue d'Antin (now Avenue Franklin D. Roosevelt) and the Champs-Élysées.

In December 1893, the rotunda became the Palais de Glace (Ice Palace), one of the most popular attractions of Belle Epoque Paris.

In the post-war years, the Theatre du Rond-Point was one of the principal venues—along with the Theatre Marigny and the Theatre de l'Odeon—where the Madeleine Renaud-Jean-Louis Barrault Company introduced the world to many of the plays of Jean Giraudoux, Eugène Ionesco, Jean Anouilh, and Samuel Beckett.

The theatre was managed by Jean-Louis Barrault from 1958 to 1968, when he was dismissed from the Gare d'Orsay during the student uprising in the spring of that year. The theatre was renovated in 1981. Further renovations in were done in 2002 under the directorship of Jean-Michel Ribes. The theatre is now devoted to the work of living authors.
