= Théâtre du Vieux-Colombier =

Theatre in Paris, France

Coordinates: 48°51′6.47″N 2°19′49.06″E

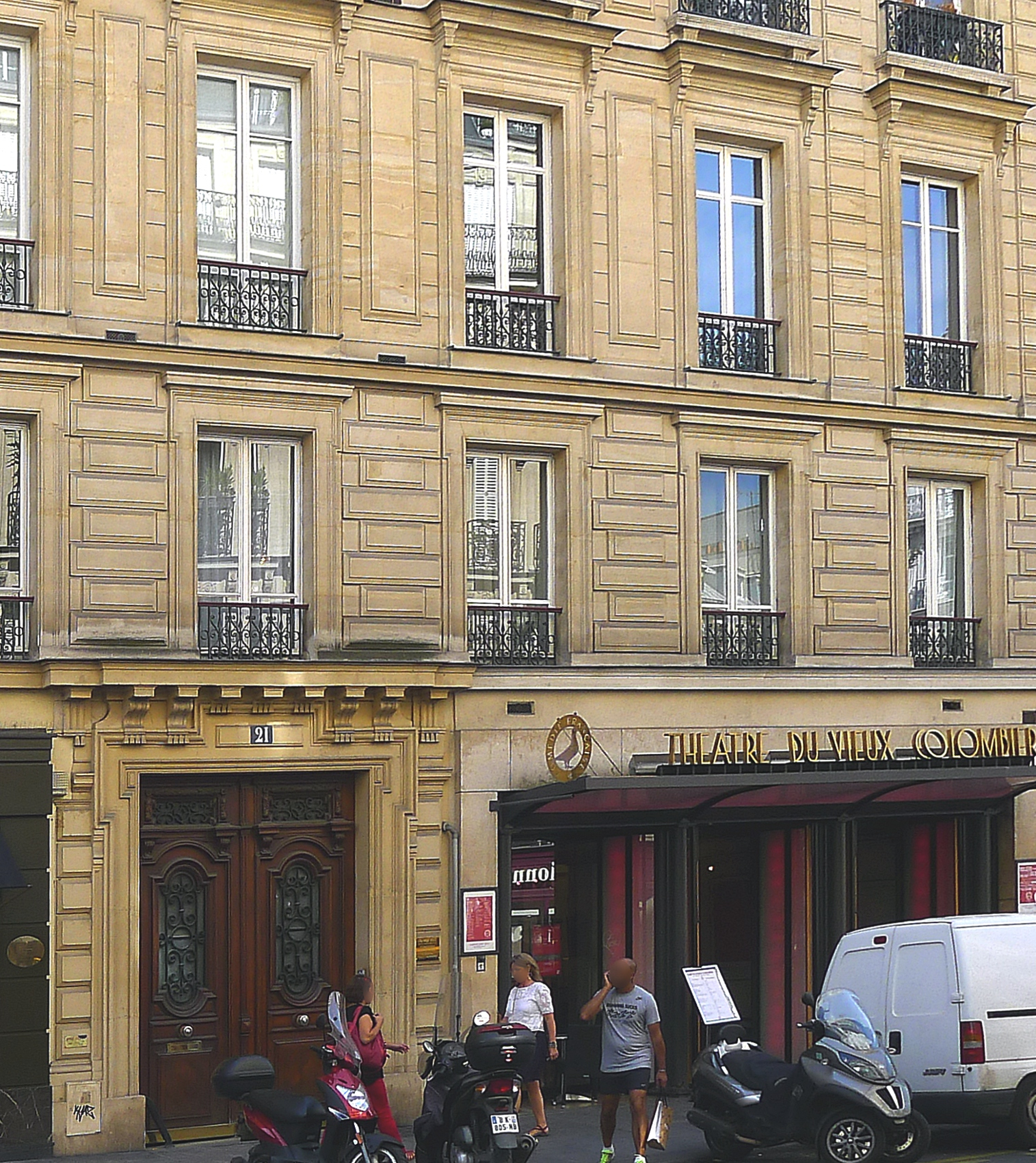
Entrance of the theater, 21 rue du vieux colombier

The Théâtre du Vieux-Colombier is a theatre located at 21, rue du Vieux-Colombier, in the 6th arrondissement of Paris. It was founded in 1913 by the theatre producer and playwright Jacques Copeau. Today it is one of the three theatres in Paris used by the Comédie-Française.

In May 1944 it saw the première of Jean-Paul Sartre's existentialist drama Huis Clos.
