= Valentine Schlegel =

French artist (1925–2021)

- Born: Valentine Rose Marie Renée Schlegel; 23 November 1925; Sète
- Died: 16 May 2021 (aged 95); Paris
- Known for: Sculpture, ceramics, visual art

Valentine Schlegel (23 November 1925 – 16 May 2021) was a French sculptor and ceramicist. Her most prominent works are the series of vases she created during the 1950s and her bespoke white plaster fireplaces. Her style could be considered as Modernist organic abstraction.

== Early life and education ==
Valentine Schlegel was born and raised in Sète, Occitania, southern France. Her paternal family were artisans, her grandfather was a carpenter, and her father owned a furniture upcycling workshop. Her elder sisters were the artist Andrée Vilar (1916–2009) and the photographer Suzanne Schlegel-Fournier (1919–2007). Valentine's interest in art stemmed from her childhood.

In 1937 she joined the French Federation of Girl Scouts. Her group was called Wakandas and it was there where she learnt about fire techniques and tool making, becoming their leader in 1942.

In 1942, she joined the Fine Arts School of Montpellier, where she mainly studied drawing and painting.

== Artistic career ==
=== Costume designer, stage manager and props specialist ===
In 1947, she started working for the Festival d'Avignon alongside her brother-in-law Jean Vilar. For four years, she fulfilled the roles of costume designer, set painter, props specialist and the assistant of painter and decorator Léon Gischia, to ultimately become the festival's artistic director in 1951.

In 1954, Valentine Schlegel worked as artistic director in La Pointe Courte, Agnès Varda’s first feature film. Both artists met in school in Sète and maintained a lifelong friendship.

In 1955, commissioned by Paul Claudel, she designs the set for L’Histoire de Tobie et de Sara.

=== Ceramicist ===
In 1945 she moved to Paris, to Vavin street, where she discovered ceramics and sculpture with Frédérique Bourguet, a friend from the Fine Arts School. Together worked in practical tool making until 1951 and their pieces were influenced by the ancient Mediterranean ceramic tradition.

From 1951 to 1957 she moved to an art studio in Daguerre street, and to a different one in Bezout street after 1957 where she continued exploring ceramics alongside her sister Andrée Vilar. Here she begins exploring new materials and experimenting with plaster casts.

From 1954 to the 1960s, she worked on her own on a series of ceramic vases using the ancient coil technique, which in 1955 were exhibited in the La Roue gallery with other pieces by Elisabeth Joulia; and again in 1956 in La Demeure gallery alongside pieces by Mario Prassinos and Andrée Vilar.

=== Artisan ===
During the 1950s, Valentine Schlegel travelled to Portugal, where she discovered Portuguese clay modelling that inspired her to make and collect nativity scene figurines.

While in Sète, she would meet with friends to do wood and leather work, making new handbags, shoes, and kitchen utensils, and they would even sometimes do bed linen embroidery. Her visits to Sète kept intact her love for the everyday object and her tradition of practical tool making.

As a nature lover, she would also often create plant compositions for her ceramic vases, which were photographed by Agnès Varda and Anne Gaillard.

=== Fireplaces and other decorative objects ===
From 1959 to 2002, assisted by Frédéric Sichel-Dulong, Schlegel designed and in-situ built around a hundred commissioned fireplaces. Some of the most notable ones were for Gérard Philipe and Jeanne Moreau.

These fireplaces were made of stucco (white plaster) and they were decorated with shelves, nooks and benches. Their organic and sinuously rounded shapes were partly inspired by the boat sails of her Mediterranean upbringing.

In 1965, Schlegel built fireplaces for the Salon des arts ménagers (SAM; Household Arts Show) exhibitions and for a furniture shop in Paris.

Commissioned by the architect Alain Pati, she worked at the foyer of a building in Courbevoie, where she designed the ceiling and carpentry while painters Denise Voïta and Jean-Loup Ricur painted the wall mosaics.

Her home at the time was used as an exhibition salon and also as a shop, and in 1976 she decided to purchase the property with The Musée des Arts décoratifs (Museum of Decorative Arts)’s curator, Yvonne Brunhammer, and divide it into two separate homes. Her home became her canvas and the place was recently emptied and sold at auction, with the hope to restore it and one day open it to the public.

In 1984, she made a bronze statue in homage to her brother-in-law Jean Vilar, which was displayed in Chaillot National Theatre, Paris; and a terracotta bust for the Paul Valéry Museum in Sète.

In 2014, Raf Simons was inspired by Valentine Schlegel when designing Christian Dior Spring/Summer haute couture runway.

=== Teaching career ===
Despite being a prolific artist and maker, by 1956 Schlegel struggled to sustain herself financially. She started teaching in the Lycée de Sèvres, but by 1958 she had founded the clay modelling department for workshops for young people under 15 at the Musée des Arts décoratifs in Paris. She taught until 1987 and exhibited her artworks there on many occasions. In 1966, Agnès Varda filmed a documentary about Schlegel's workshops called Les Enfants du musée.

She had many assistants throughout her career, among them were Frédéric Sichel-Dulong, one of her past students; Catherine Bouroche, Marie-Noël Verdier, Claudie Sichel-Dulong, Francis Bérezné, Philippe Cotta, Christian Desse, Vincent Fournier and Blaise Fournier.

== Personal life ==
As a lesbian, Schlegel enjoyed the freedom and the tolerance she was able to find in Paris and was as well close to feminist circles.

She died of Alzheimer's disease in Paris on 16 May 2021 at the age of 96.

== Exhibitions and retrospectives ==
- La Roue in 1955 with Elisabeth Joulia.
- La Demeure in 1956 with Mario Prassinos and Andrée Vilar.
- Antagonismes 2, l’objet in the Musée des Arts Décoratifs in 1962.
- La Demeure in 1975, invited by Denise Majorel.
- Ils collectionnent in 1974, invited by François Mathey.
- Métiers de l’art in the Musée des Arts Décoratifs.
- Céramiques 1950-1958, exhibition in Pierre Staudenmeyer's Mouvements Modernes gallery in 2005.
- Cette femme pourrait dormir dans l'eau in the CAC de Brétigny in 2017, by Hélène Bertin.
- Valentine Schlegel, Tu m’accompagneras à la plage? in Sète in 2019 in the CRAC, by Hélène Bertin.
- Valentine Schlegel par Agnès Varda, Galerie Nathalie Obadia in París, 2020.
- Valentine Schlegel, l'art pour quotidien, curated by the Musée Fabre at the hotel Cabrières-Sabatier d’Espeyran in Montpellier, 2023.
