= Agnès Varda =

French filmmaker and photographer (1928–2019)

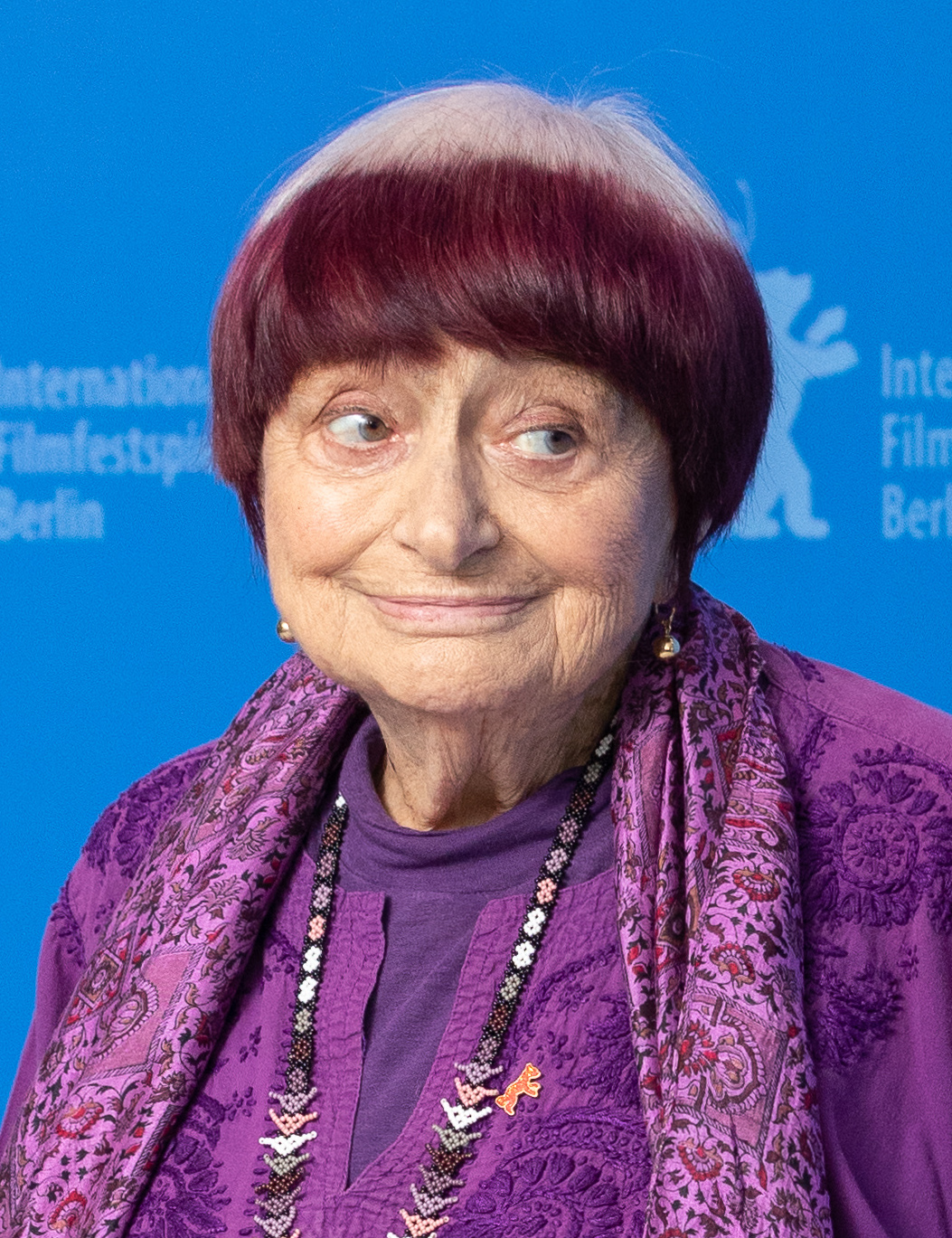
- Varda at the 2019 Berlin Film Festival
- Born: Arlette Varda; 30 May 1928; Ixelles, Brussels, Belgium
- Died: 29 March 2019 (aged 90); Paris, France
- Education: University of Paris
- Occupations: Film director; film producer; screenwriter; film editor; artist; photographer
- Years active: 1951–2019
- Notable work: La Pointe Courte (1955); Cléo from 5 to 7 (1962); Vagabond (1985); The Gleaners and I (2000); Faces Places (2017)
- Spouse: Jacques Demy (m. 1962; died 1990)
- Children: Rosalie Varda; Mathieu Demy

Agnès Varda (Note: French pronunciation: [aɲɛs vaʁda].) (born Arlette Varda; 30 May 1928 – 29 March 2019) was a Belgian-born French filmmaker, artist, and photographer.

Varda's work employed location shooting in an era when the limitations of sound technology made it easier and more common to film indoors, with constructed sets and painted backdrops of landscapes, rather than outdoors, on location. Her use of non-professional actors was also unconventional for 1950s French cinema. Varda's feature film debut was La Pointe Courte (1955), followed by Cléo from 5 to 7 (1962), one of her most notable narrative films, Vagabond (1985), and Kung Fu Master (1988). Varda was also known for her work as a documentarian, with such works as Black Panthers (1968), The Gleaners and I (2000), The Beaches of Agnès (2008), Faces Places (2017), and her final film, Varda by Agnès (2019).

Filmmaker Martin Scorsese described Varda as "one of the Gods of Cinema". Among several other accolades, Varda received an Honorary Palme d'Or at the 2015 Cannes Film Festival, becoming the first female filmmaker to win the award, a Golden Lion for Vagabond at the 1985 Venice Film Festival, a nomination for the Academy Award for Best Documentary Feature for Faces Places. In 2001, she was honored with an Honorary César. In 2017, she became the first female director to win an Academy Honorary Award.

== Early life and education ==
Varda was born Arlette Varda on 30 May 1928 in Ixelles, Brussels, Belgium, to Christiane (née Pasquet) and Eugène Jean Varda, an engineer. Her mother was from Sète, France, and her father was a member of a family of Greek refugees from Asia Minor in the Ottoman Empire. She was the third of five children. Varda legally changed her first name to Agnès at age 18.

She left Belgium with her family in 1940 for Sète, where she spent her teenage years and during World War II, she lived there on a boat with her family. Here started her life-long friendship with the sculptor Valentine Schlegel.

Varda studied art history at the École du Louvre and photography at the École des Beaux-Arts, before working as a photographer at the Théâtre National Populaire in Paris. Varda attended the Lycée et collège Victor-Duruy, and received a bachelor's degree in literature and psychology from the Sorbonne. She called her relocation to Paris "truly excruciating", saying it gave her "a frightful memory of my arrival in this grey, inhumane, sad city." She did not get along with her fellow students and called classes at the Sorbonne "stupid, antiquated, abstract, [and] scandalously unsuited for the lofty needs one had at that age."

== Photography career ==
Varda intended to become a museum curator, and studied art history at the École du Louvre, but decided to study photography at the Vaugirard School of Photography instead. She began her career as a still photographer before becoming one of the major voices of the Left Bank Cinema and the French New Wave. She maintained a fluid interrelationship between photographic and cinematic forms: "I take photographs or I make films. Or I put films in the photos, or photos in the films."

Varda discussed her beginnings with the medium of still photography: "I started earning a living from photography straight away, taking trivial photographs of families and weddings to make money. But I immediately wanted to make what I called 'compositions.' And it was with these that I had the impression I was doing something where I was asking questions with composition, form and meaning." In 1951, her friend Jean Vilar opened the Théâtre National Populaire and hired Varda as its official photographer. Before accepting her position there, she worked as a stage photographer for the Theatre Festival of Avignon. She worked at the Théâtre National Populaire for ten years from 1951 to 1961, during which time her reputation grew and she eventually obtained photo-journalist jobs throughout Europe.

Varda's still photography sometimes inspired her subsequent motion pictures. She recounted: "When I made my first film, La Pointe Courte—without experience, without having been an assistant before, without having gone to film school—I took photographs of everything I wanted to film, photographs that are almost models for the shots. And I started making films with the sole experience of photography, that's to say, where to place the camera, at what distance, with which lens and what lights?"

She later recalled another example:

I made a film in 1982 called Ulysse, which is based on another photograph I took in 1954, one I'd made with the same bellows camera, and I started Ulysse with the words, 'I used to see the image upside down.' There's an image of a goat on the ground, like a fallen constellation, and that was the origin of the photograph. With those cameras, you'd frame the image upside down, so I saw Brassaï through the camera with his head at the bottom of the image.

In 2010, Varda joined the gallery Nathalie Obadia.

== Filmmaking career ==
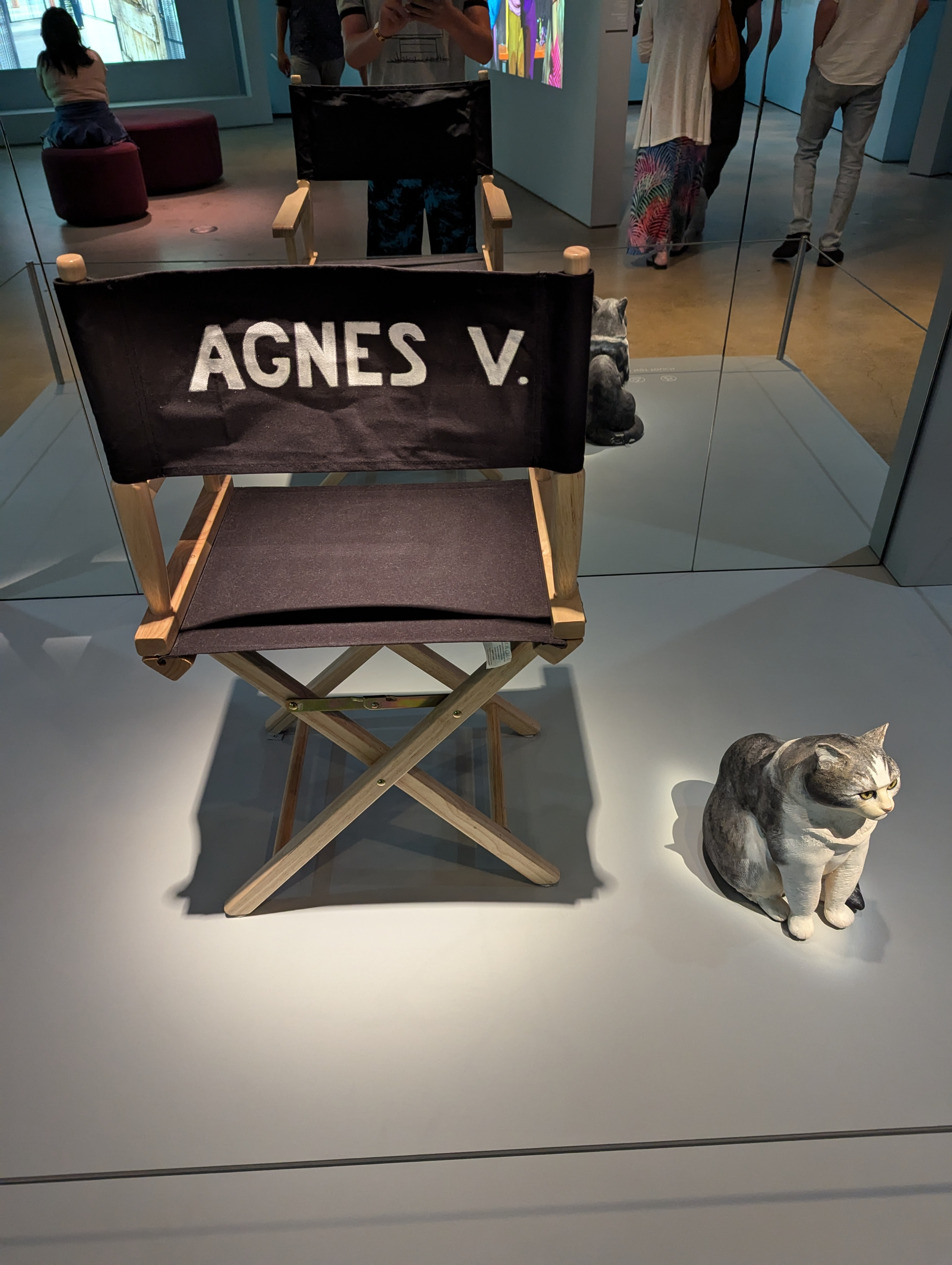
Varda's directing chair at the Academy Museum in Los Angeles, California. The cat doll beside the chair is in reference to Varda's love of cats.

Varda's filmmaking career predates the French New Wave, but contains many elements specific to that movement. While working as a photographer, Varda became interested in making a film, although she stated that she knew little about the medium and had only seen around 20 films by the age of 25. She later said that she wrote her first screenplay "just the way a person writes his first book. When I'd finished writing it, I thought to myself: 'I'd like to shoot that script,' and so some friends and I formed a cooperative to make it." She found the filmmaking process difficult because it did not allow the same freedom as writing a novel; she said her approach was instinctive and feminine. In an interview with The Believer, Varda said that she wanted to make films that related to her time (in reference to La Pointe Courte), rather than focusing on traditions or classical standards.

Alternatively, taking a less mythologized approach, Varda can be seen as emerging as part of a very diverse and neglected galaxy of makers in France's postwar media ecosystem. This late-1940s and 1950s generation, deliberately obscured by the rhetorically assertive New Wave filmmakers of the 1960s, typically made commissioned short films, proto-essay films, and media of all kinds designed to foster media literacy among an engaged viewing citizenry. Key makers include Nicole Vèdres, Yannick Bellon, Chris Marker and Georges Franju. As Tim Palmer argues, re-placing Varda back among her actual postwar peers contextualizes how around "Varda's arrival we find pivotal craft idioms across mixed media: probing but non-hagiographic social engagements with shared memory, people and their places; commissioned texts that query and frequently challenge their own nominal goals; shorts and medium films that thrive in their subversive and sometimes experimental non-feature format."

=== La Pointe Courte (1955) ===
Varda liked photography but was interested in moving into film. After spending a few days filming the small French fishing town of Sète, in the old fisherman's quarter of La Pointe Courte, for a terminally ill friend who could no longer visit on his own, Varda decided to shoot a feature film of her own, leaving the artistic direction in the hands of her partner Valentine Schlegel. Thus, in 1955, Varda's first film, La Pointe Courte, about an unhappy couple working through their relationship in a small fishing town, was released. The film is a stylistic precursor to the French New Wave. At the time, Varda was influenced by the philosophy of Gaston Bachelard, under whom she had once studied at the Sorbonne. "She was particularly interested in his theory of 'l'imagination des matières,' in which certain personality traits were found to correspond to concrete elements in a kind of psychoanalysis of the material world." This idea finds expression in La Pointe Courte as the characters' personality traits clash, shown through the opposition of objects such as wood and steel. To further her interest in character abstraction, Varda used two professional actors, Silvia Monfort and Philippe Noiret, combined with the residents of La Pointe Courte, to provide a realistic element that lends itself to a documentary aesthetic inspired by neorealism. Varda continued to use this combination of fictional and documentary elements in her films.

The film was edited by Varda's friend and fellow "Left Bank" filmmaker Alain Resnais, who was reluctant to work on it because it was "so nearly the film he wanted to make himself"; Resnais's 1959 film Hiroshima mon amour would later feature a similar structure. Resnais and Varda remained lifelong friends, though Resnais said they had nothing in common "apart from cats". The film was immediately praised by Cahiers du Cinéma: André Bazin said, "There is a total freedom to the style, which produces the impression, so rare in the cinema, that we are in the presence of a work that obeys only the dreams and desires of its auteur with no other external obligations." François Truffaut called it "an experimental work, ambitious, honest and intelligent." Varda said that the film "hit like a cannonball because I was a young woman, since before that, in order to become a director you had to spend years as an assistant." But the film was a financial failure, and Varda made only short films for the next seven years.

Varda is considered the grandmother and mother of the French New Wave. La Pointe Courte is unofficially but widely considered the first film of the movement. It was the first of many she made that focus on issues ordinary people face. Late in her life, she said that she was not interested in accounts of people in power but "much more interested in the rebels, the people who fight for their own life".

=== Cléo from 5 to 7 (1961) ===
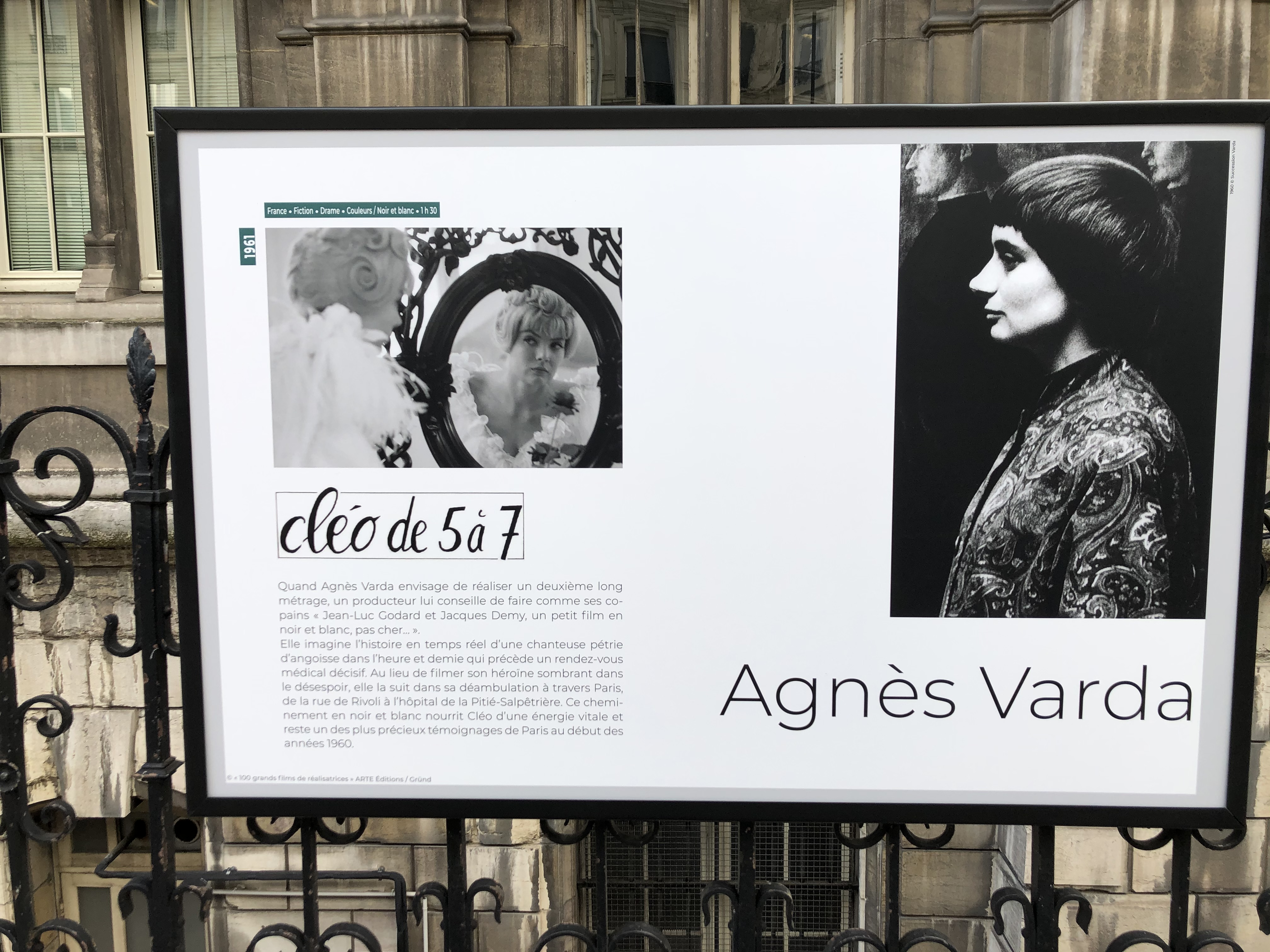
Commemorative poster for Varda's Cléo from 5 to 7 (1961)

After La Pointe Courte, Varda made several documentary short films; two were commissioned by the French tourist office. These include one of Varda's favorites of her own works, L'opéra-mouffe, a film about the Rue Mouffetard street market which won an award at the 1958 Brussels Experimental Film Festival.

Cléo from 5 to 7 follows a pop singer through two extraordinary hours in which she awaits the results of a recent biopsy. The film is superficially about a woman coming to terms with her mortality, a common trope for Varda. On a deeper level, Cléo from 5 to 7 confronts the traditionally objectified woman by giving Cléo her own vision. She cannot be constructed through the gaze of others, which is often represented through a motif of reflections and Cléo's ability to strip her body of "to-be-looked-at" attributes (such as clothing or wigs). Stylistically, Cléo from 5 to 7 mixes documentary and fiction, as had La Pointe Courte. The film represents diegetic action said to occur between 5 and 7 p.m., although its run-time is 89 minutes.

=== Daguerréotypes (1976) ===
Daguerréotypes is a 1976 documentary film directed by Agnès Varda, capturing the lives of shopkeepers and residents along Rue Daguerre, a small street in Paris where Varda lived. The film takes its title from both the name of the street and the term "daguerreotype", reflecting Varda's fascination with preserving fleeting moments in time. Through a series of intimate vignettes, the documentary explores the routines, stories, and relationships of local bakers, butchers, tailors, and other small business owners. With its static camera work and observational approach, the film offers a heartfelt and authentic portrayal of a community rooted in tradition amidst the evolving urban landscape. Widely regarded as a time capsule of 1970s Paris, Daguerréotypes exemplifies Varda's ability to find poetry in everyday life and elevate the mundane into something profoundly human.

=== Ciné-Tamaris (1977) ===
In 1977, Varda founded her own production company, Ciné-Tamaris, in order to have more control over shooting and editing. In 2013, the Los Angeles County Museum of Art held Varda's first American exhibition, Agnès Varda in Californialand. It featured a sculptural installation, several photographs, and short films, and was inspired by time she spent in Los Angeles in the 1960s.

=== One Sings, the Other Doesn't (1977) ===
Produced by Cine-Tamaris, L'une chante, l'autre pas—otherwise known as One Sings, the Other Doesn't—focuses on two women over the span of 14 years during the Women's Movement of 1970s France. 22-year-old Suzanne is pregnant with a third child she can not afford. 17-year-old singer Pomme pays for Suzanne to have an abortion. Pomme becomes a pop singer and feminist, forming a group dedicated to women's liberation, while Suzanne raises her children and writes about life on the farm. The story follows the two as they live their separate lives but keep in touch throughout the years.

=== Vagabond (1985) ===
In 1985, Varda made Sans toit ni loi ("without roof nor law"; known in most English-speaking countries as Vagabond), a drama about the death of a young female drifter named Mona. The death is investigated by an unseen and unheard interviewer who focuses on the people who last saw her. Vagabond is told through nonlinear techniques, with the film divided into 47 episodes, and each episode about Mona told from a different person's perspective. Vagabond is considered one of Varda's greater feminist works because of how the film deals with the de-fetishization of the female body from the male perspective.

=== Kung-Fu Master! (1988) ===
Kung-Fu Master! is a 1988 French drama film directed by Agnès Varda. The narrative centers on Mary-Jane, a woman in her forties, who becomes romantically involved with Julien, a 14-year-old boy and classmate of her daughter, Lucy. The film delves into themes of unconventional love, societal taboos, and the loneliness of adulthood, offering a nuanced portrayal of complex human emotions. Jane Birkin stars as Mary-Jane, with Mathieu Demy, Varda's son, portraying Julien, and Charlotte Gainsbourg as Lucy, adding depth to the familial dynamics explored in the story. The film's title references Julien's fascination with the arcade game "Kung-Fu Master", which serves as a recurring motif, symbolizing his youthful escapism and the generational gap between the two protagonists.

Kung-Fu Master! was selected to compete for the Golden Bear at the 38th Berlin International Film Festival, highlighting its critical recognition. Although polarizing due to its subject matter, the film remains a bold exploration of taboo relationships and human vulnerability, cementing Agnès Varda's reputation as a fearless storyteller who refuses to shy away from difficult questions.

=== Jacquot de Nantes (1991) ===
In 1991, shortly after her husband Jacques Demy's death, Varda created the film Jacquot de Nantes, which is about his life and death. The film is structured at first as being a recreation of his early life, being obsessed with the various crafts used for filmmaking like animation and set design. But then Varda provides elements of documentary by inserting clips of Demy's films as well as footage of him dying. The film continues with Varda's common theme of accepting death, but at its heart it is considered to be Varda's tribute to her late husband and their work.

=== The Gleaners and I (2000) ===
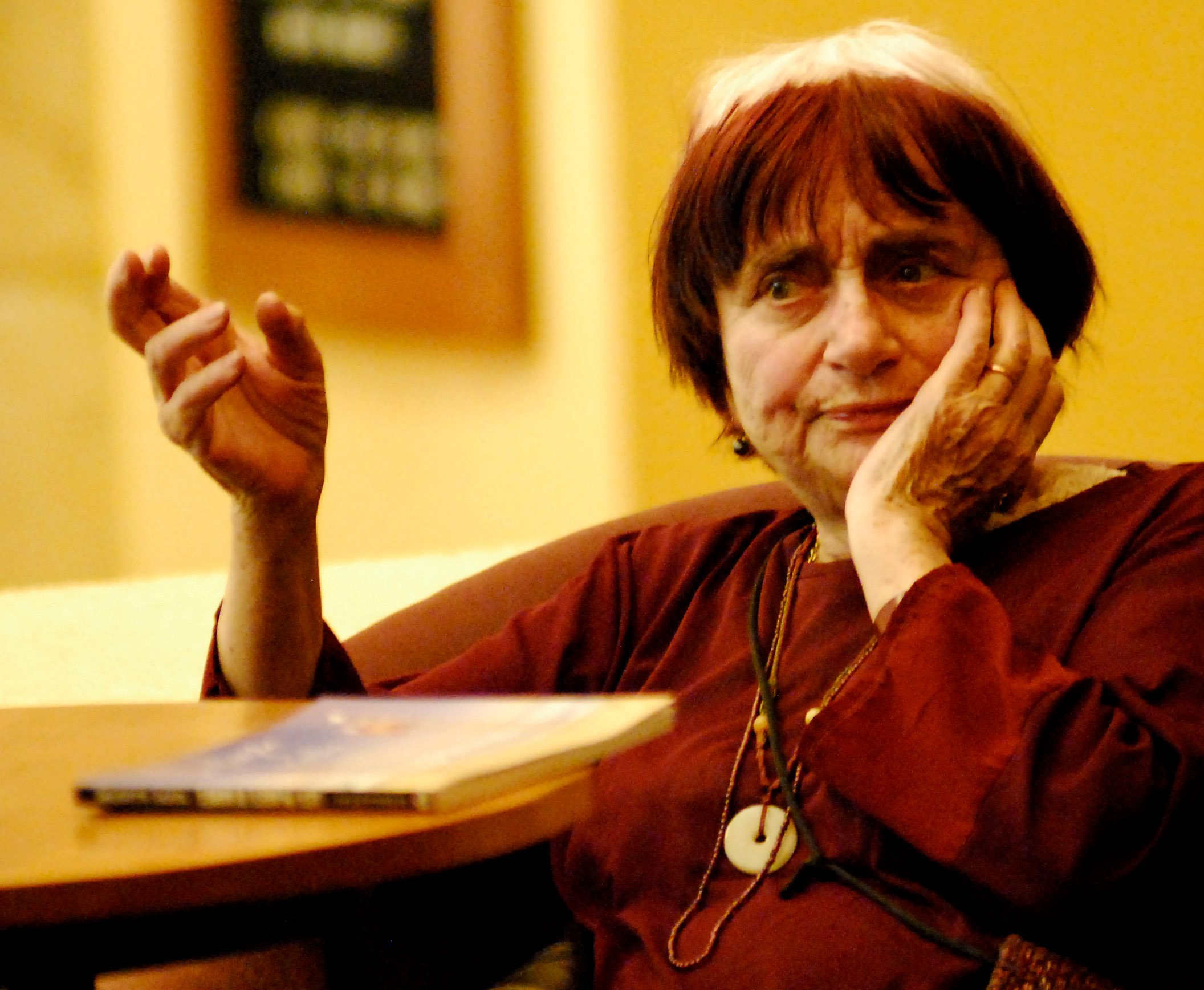
Varda at the Guadalajara International Film Festival in 2010

Les Glaneurs et la Glaneuse (The Gleaners and I), a documentary, focuses on Varda's interactions with gleaners (harvesters) who live in the French countryside, and also includes subjects who create art through recycled material, as well as an interview with psychoanalyst Jean Laplanche. The film is notable for its fragmented and free-form nature along with it being the first time Varda used digital cameras. This style of filmmaking is often interpreted as a statement that great things like art can still be created through scraps, yet modern economies encourage people to only use the finest product.

Of The Gleaners and I, Varda said, "It's the treatment of reality that's interesting, the way beauty is emphasised. It may be unfashionable to say so, but I like beauty. Though that might seem strange in a social documentary." Agnès Varda made a sequel two years later, titled The Gleaners and I: Two Years Later , a documentary in which she reunited with several protagonists from The Gleaners. They discuss how their lives have unfolded and share their opinions on the first film.

=== Faces Places (2017) ===
In 2017, Varda co-directed Faces Places with the artist JR. The film was screened out of competition at the 2017 Cannes Film Festival where it won the L'Œil d'or award. The film follows Varda and JR traveling around rural France, creating portraits of the people they come across. Varda was nominated for the Academy Award for Best Documentary Feature for this film, making her the oldest person to be nominated for a competitive Oscar. Although the nomination was her first, Varda did not regard it as important, stating: "There is nothing to be proud of, but happy. Happy because we make films to love. We make films so that you love the film." The film ends with Varda and JR knocking on Jean-Luc Godard's front door in Rolle for an interview. Godard agreed to the meeting but "stands them up".

=== Varda by Agnes (2019) ===
The last film Varda directed, Varda by Agnes features Varda watching and discussing her films and work. She recounts her 60-year artistic journey through photography and filmmaking. She expresses the importance of three key words: inspiration, creation, and sharing. The film shows Varda sitting and reflecting on the things she loves, such as her husband, cats, colors, beaches, and heart-shaped potatoes.

== Style and influences ==
Many of Varda's films use protagonists that are marginalized or rejected members of society, and are documentary in nature. She made a short film on the Black Panthers after seeing that their leader, Huey Newton, was arrested for killing a police officer. The film focuses on demonstrations in support of Newton and the "Free Huey" campaign.

Like many other French New Wave directors, Varda was likely influenced by auteur theory, creating her own signature style by using the camera "as a pen". Varda called her method of filmmaking "cinécriture" ("cinematic writing" or "writing on film"). Rather than separating the fundamental roles that contribute to a film (such as cinematographer, screenwriter, and director), she believed that all roles should work together simultaneously to create a more cohesive film, and all elements of the film should contribute to its message. She claimed to make most of her discoveries while editing, seeking the opportunity to find images or dialogue that create a motif.

Because of her photographic background, still images are often significant in her films. They may serve symbolic or narrative purposes, and each element of them is important. There is sometimes conflict between still and moving images in her films, and she often mixed still images (snapshots) with moving images. Varda paid very close attention to detail and was highly conscious of the implications of each cinematic choice she made. Elements of the film are rarely just functional, each element has its own implications, both on its own and that it lends to the entire film's message.

Many of her influences were artistic or literary, including Surrealism, William Faulkner, Franz Kafka, and Nathalie Sarraute.

=== Involvement in the French New Wave ===
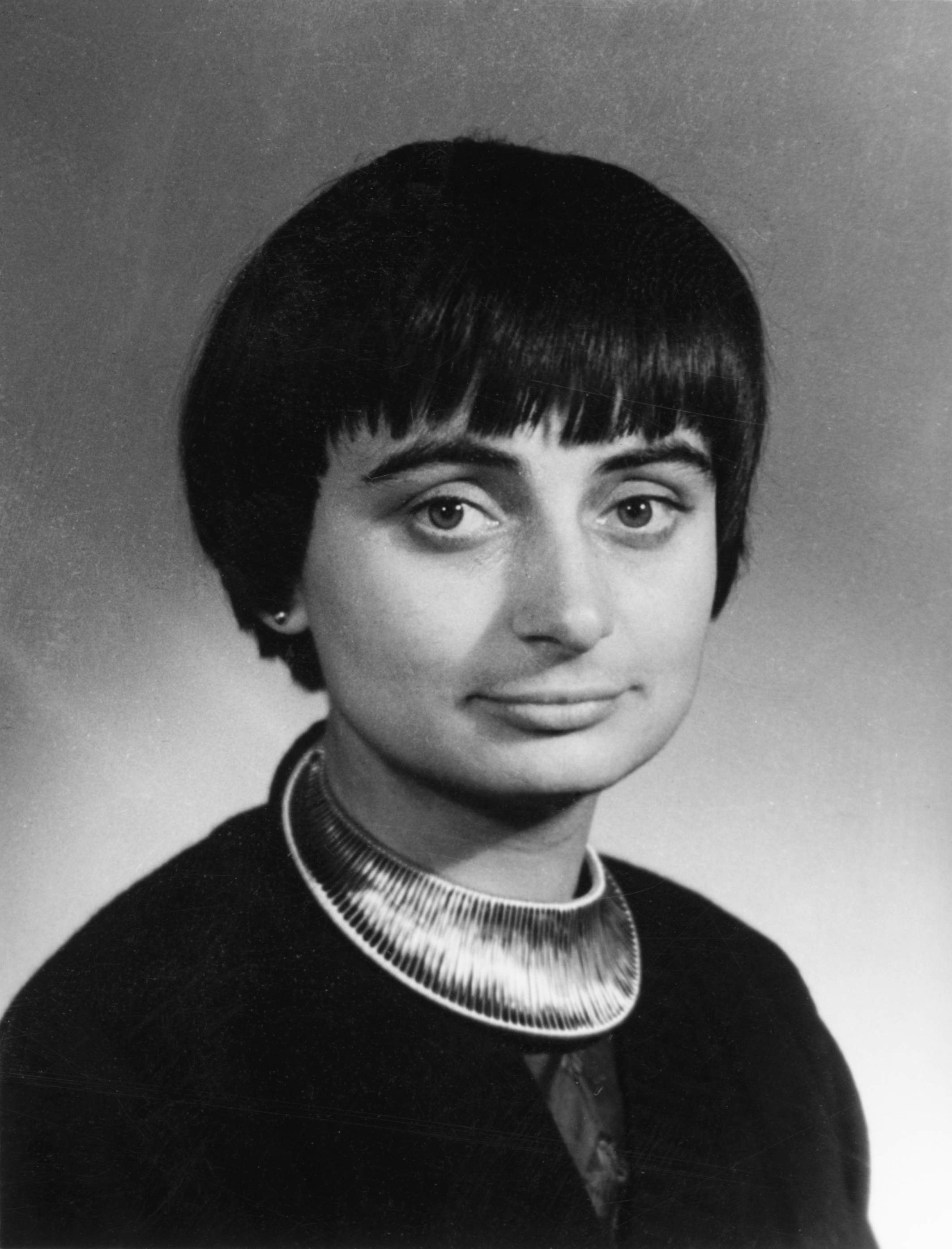
Varda in 1962

Because of her literary influences, and because her work predates the French New Wave, Varda's films belong more precisely to the Left Bank (Rive Gauche) cinema movement, along with those of Resnais, Chris Marker, Marguerite Duras, Alain Robbe-Grillet, Jean Cayrol and Henri Colpi. Categorically, the Left Bank side of the New Wave movement embraced a more experimental style than the Cahiers du Cinéma group, but this distinction is ironic considering that the New Wave itself was considered experimental in its treatment of traditional methodologies and subjects.

Left Bank Cinema was strongly tied to the nouveau roman movement in literature. The members of the group had in common a background in documentary filmmaking, left-wing politics, and a heightened interest in experimentation and the treatment of film as art. Varda and other Left Bank filmmakers crafted a mode of filmmaking that blends one of film's most socially motivated approaches, documentary, with one of its most formally experimental approaches, the avant-garde. Its members often collaborated with each other. According to scholar Delphine Bénézet, Varda resisted the "norms of representation and diktats of production."

=== As a feminist filmmaker ===
Varda's work is often considered feminist because of her use of female protagonists and her creation of a female cinematic voice. She said, "I'm not at all a theoretician of feminism. I did all that—my photos, my craft, my film, my life—on my terms, my own terms, and not to do it like a man." Although not actively involved in any strict agendas of the feminist movement, Varda often focused on women's issues thematically and never tried to change her craft to make it more conventional or masculine. She was also Professor of Film at The European Graduate School.

Bénézet has argued for Varda's importance as "a woman of singularity" (au feminin singulier), and of the utmost importance in film history. Varda embraced her femininity with distinct boldness.

== Personal life and death ==
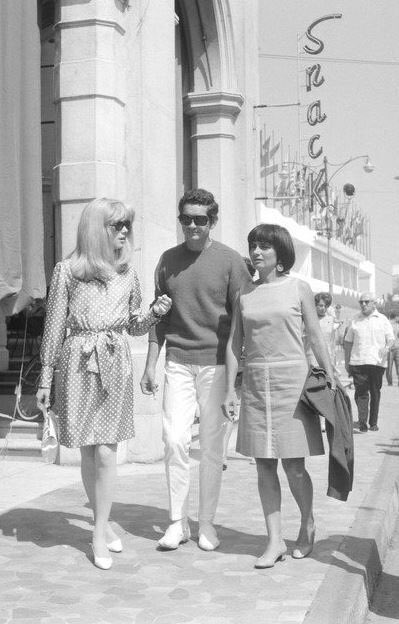
Catherine Deneuve, Jacques Demy and Varda (left-to-right) in Venice, 1966

In 1958, while at a short film festival in Tours, Varda met her future husband, Jacques Demy, also a French director. They moved in together in 1959. She was married to Demy from 1962 until his death in 1990. Varda had two children: a daughter, Rosalie Varda (born 1958), from a previous union with actor Antoine Bourseiller (who starred in Cléo from 5 to 7), and a son, Mathieu Demy (born 1972), with Demy. Demy legally adopted Rosalie Varda. Varda worked on the Oscar-nominated documentary Faces Places with her daughter.

In 1971, Varda was one of the 343 women who signed the Manifesto of the 343 admitting they had had an abortion despite it being illegal in France at the time and asking that abortion be made legal. That same year, she was one of only four people to attend the funeral of her friend Jim Morrison at Père Lachaise Cemetery.

Varda was the cousin of the painter Jean Varda. In 1967, while living in California, Varda met her father's cousin for the first time. He is the subject of her short documentary Uncle Yanco. Jean Varda called himself "Yanco" and was affectionately called "uncle" by Varda due to their age difference.

Varda died from cancer on 29 March 2019 in Paris, at the age of 90. She was buried at Montparnasse Cemetery on 2 April. Among those who attended her funeral were Catherine Deneuve, Julie Gayet, Jean-Pierre Léaud, Jane Birkin, and Sandrine Bonnaire. Mourners left flowers and potatoes outside her house on rue Daguerre.

Her death drew a passionate response from the filmmaking community with Martin Scorsese releasing a statement writing, "I seriously doubt that Agnès Varda ever followed in anyone else's footsteps, in any corner of her life or her art. Every single one of her remarkable handmade pictures, so beautifully balanced between documentary and fiction, is like no one else's—every image, every cut … What a body of work she left behind: movies big and small, playful and tough, generous and solitary, lyrical and unflinching … and alive." Barry Jenkins tweeted, "Work and life were undeniably fused for this legend. She lived fully for every moment of those 90 damn years". Ava DuVernay wrote about her relationship with Varda, ending her statement with "Merci, Agnes. For your films. For your passion. For your light. It shines on." Other filmmakers and artists who paid tribute to Varda include Guillermo del Toro, the Safdie brothers, Edgar Wright, JR and Madonna. Jean-Luc Godard sent Varda's daughter Rosalie (who produced Faces Places) "a kind of photo collage of Agnès ... It was something special. It's a secret. But he sent me something nice. I think he cared for Agnès a lot. He saw all her films", she said.

== Awards and honors ==
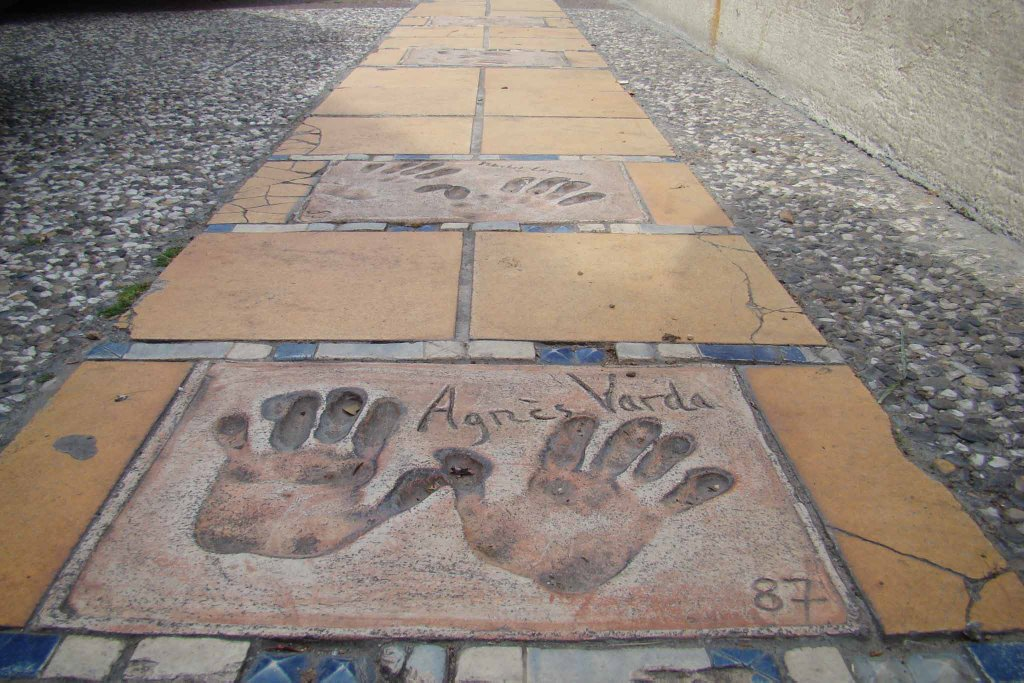
Varda's handprints at Cannes

Varda has achieved the rare feat of winning the most important accolades: a Hollywood Oscar, a Berlin Bear, a Venice Lion, an honorary Palme from Cannes and several Césars. She has been a member of the jury at the Cannes Film Festival in 2005 and a member of the jury at the Venice Film Festival in 1983. Below is an incomplete list focussing on the major prizes.

- Varda's first feature-length film La Pointe Courte immediately won her the Prix de l'Âge d'Or in Brussels, Belgium (where she had lived between 1928 and 1940 before her family fled to Sète, where the film is set).
- Her second film Cléo from 5 to 7 received much acclaim and nominations, and won two minor awards.
- Her third feature film Le Bonheur (1965) won her a Silver Bear at the Berlin International Film Festival.
- In 1984 she received her first of three César Awards for her movie short Ulysse.
- For the 1985 documentary-style feature film Vagabond (Sans Toit Ni Loi), she received the Golden Lion of the 42nd Venice International Film Festival.
- On 24 February 2001 she received an Honorary César for her film work so far. (Charlotte Rampling also received one the same night.)
- In 2002, she was the recipient of the French Academy prize, the René Clair Award.
- On 4 March 2007, she was appointed a Grand Officer of the National Order of Merit of France.
- In February 2009, The Beaches of Agnès won the Best Documentary Film award at the 34th César Awards.
- On 12 April 2009, she was made Commandeur de la Légion d'honneur.
- In May 2010, Varda received the Directors' Fortnight's 8th Carosse d'Or award for lifetime achievement at the Cannes Film Festival.
- On 22 September 2010, Varda received an honorary degree from University of Liège, Belgium.
- In 2012 the City of Brussels decides to rename the Ecole de Photographie de la Ville de Bruxelles after her; the official unveiling of L'Ecole de Photographie et de Techniques Visuelles Agnès Varda is on 2013-09-25.
- On 14 May 2013, Varda was promoted to Grand Cross of the Ordre national du Mérite of the French republic.
- On 22 May 2013, Varda received the 2013 FIAF Award for her work in the field of film preservation and restoration.
- On 10 August 2014, Varda received the Leopard of Honour award at the 67th Locarno Film Festival. She was the second female to receive the award after Kira Muratova.
- On 13 December 2014, Varda received the honorary Lifetime Achievement Award, presented by the European Film Academy.
- On 24 May 2015, Varda was the first woman to receive an honorary Palme d'Or.
- On 16 April 2017, Varda was promoted to Grand officier of the Legion of Honour.
- Varda was included in Cinema Eye's 2017 list of "Unforgettables".
- At the time of her death, Varda was the oldest person to be nominated for an Academy Honorary Award. She received it on 11 November 2017 for her contributions to cinema, making her the first female director to receive such an award. The prize was presented to her by Angelina Jolie at the 9th Annual Governors Awards ceremony. She was nominated two months later for the Academy Award for Best Documentary Feature for her documentary Faces Places, becoming the oldest nominated person at the show (she was eight days older than fellow nominee James Ivory).
- In 2017 Varda also won L'Œil d'or (The Golden Eye, The Documentary Prize - Cannes) for Faces Places.
- In 2019 she received a second major award at the Berlin International Film Festival, viz. the Berlinale Kamera.
- In 2019, the BBC polled 368 film experts from 84 countries to name the 100 best films by women directors. Varda was the most-named director, with six different films on the list: The Beaches of Agnès, One Sings, the Other Doesn't, The Gleaners and I, Le Bonheur, Vagabond, and the number-two entry on the list, Cléo from 5 to 7.

== Major exhibitions and retrospectives ==
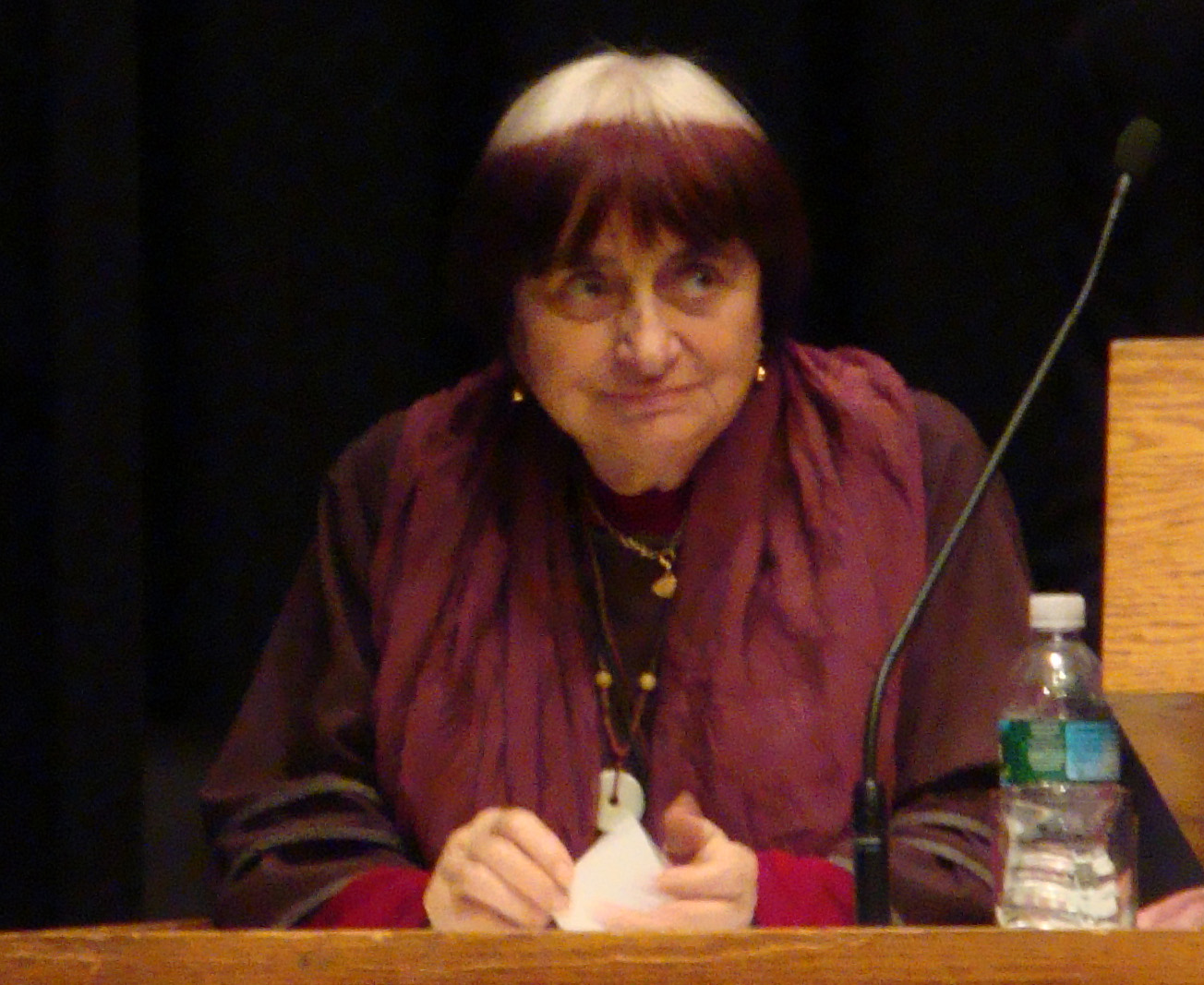
Varda speaking at a 2009 retrospective series of her work at the Harvard Film Archive

- Agnès Varda, L'île et elle, Fondation Cartier pour l'Art Contemporain, Paris, France. 18 June – 8 October 2006.
- Agnès Varda at Bildmuseet, Umeå University, Sweden. 2 June 2013 – 18 August 2013.
- Agnès Varda in Californialand at the Los Angeles County Museum of Art (LACMA), USA, 3 November 2013 – 22 July 2014.
- Agnès Varda - Patates & Compagnie at the Museum of Ixelles in Brussels, Belgium, 25 February – 29 May 2016.
- Agnès Varda at Blum Gallery, New York, USA, 2 March – 15 April 2017.
- Varda: A Retrospective at the Lincoln Center, New York, USA, 20 December 2019 – 6 January 2020.
- Valentine Schlegel par Agnès Varda in Galerie Nathalie Obadia, Paris, France, 5 November – 19 December 2020.
- Agnès Varda Expo 54 at Institut pour la Photographie, Lille, France, 8 October – 5 December 2021.
- Agnès Varda - My First Life at the Finnish Museum of Photography in Helsinki, Finland, 13 May – 28 August 2022.
- Das dritte Leben der Agnès Varda at Silent Green in Berlin, Germany, 9 June – 20 July 2022.
- Agnès Varda – Plages, Cabanes et Coquillages in Cannes, France, 8 July – 20 November 2022.
- Viva Varda!: a retrospective exhibit at the Cinémathèque française, Paris, France, 11 October 2023, to 28 January 2024.
- Director's Inspiration: Agnès Varda at the Academy Museum of Motion Pictures in Los Angeles, USA, until 5 January 2025.
- Agnès Varda's Paris from here to there at the Musée Historie de Paris Carnavalet in Paris 9 April 2025 to 24 August 2025.

== Filmography ==
=== Feature films ===
Year	English title	Original title	Notes
1955	La Pointe Courte		
1962	Cléo from 5 to 7	Cléo de 5 à 7	
1965	Le Bonheur		
1966	The Creatures	Les Créatures	
1967	Far from Vietnam	Loin du Vietnam	Anthology film
1969	Lions Love		Also producer
1975	Daguerréotypes		
1977	One Sings, the Other Doesn't	L'Une chante, l'autre pas	
1981	Mur Murs		
1981	Documenteur		
1985	Vagabond	Sans toit ni loi	Also editor
1988	Jane B. by Agnes V.	Jane B. par Agnès V.	Also editor
1988	Kung Fu Master	Le petit amour	
1991	Jacquot de Nantes		
1993	The Young Girls Turn 25	Les demoiselles ont eu 25 ans	
1995	One Hundred and One Nights	Les Cent et une nuits de Simon Cinéma	
1995	The World of Jacques Demy	L'univers de Jacques Demy	
2000	The Gleaners and I	Les Glaneurs et la glaneuse	Also producer and editor
2002	The Gleaners and I: Two Years Later	Les Glaneurs et la glaneuse... deux ans après	Also producer and editor
2004	Cinévardaphoto		
2006	Some Widows of Noirmoutier	Quelques veuves de Noirmoutier	Also producer and editor
2008	The Beaches of Agnès	Les plages d'Agnès	Also producer and editor
2017	Faces Places	Visages Villages	Co-director and co-editor
2019	Varda by Agnès	Varda par Agnès	Also editor

=== Short films ===
Year	English title	Original title	Notes
1958	Diary of a Pregnant Woman	L'opéra-mouffe	
1958	La cocotte d'azur		
1958	Along the Coast / Coasting the Coast	Du côté de la côte	
1958	Ô saisons, ô châteaux		
1960		La Mélangite	unfinished due to lack of funding
1961	Les fiancés du pont MacDonald (Méfiez-vous des lunettes noires)		
1963	Salut les cubains		
1965	Elsa la rose		
1966	Museum Children	Les enfants du musée	
1966		Christmas Carole	unfinished due to lack of funding
1967	Uncle Yanco	Oncle Yanco	
1968	Black Panthers		
1975	Women Reply	Réponse de femmes: Notre corps, notre sexe	
1976	Plaisir d'amour en Iran		
1982	Ulysse		
1984	The So-Called Caryatids	Les dites cariatides	
1984	7p. cuis., s. de b., ... à saisir		
1986	You've Got Beautiful Stairs, You Know	T'as de beaux escaliers, tu sais	
2002	Tribute to Zgougou the Cat	Hommage à Zgougou (et salut à Sabine Mamou)	
2003	Le lion volatil		
2004	Ydessa, the Bears etc.	Ydessa, les ours et etc.	
2004	Vienna International Film Festival 2004 – Trailer	Viennale Walzer	
2005	The So-Called Caryatids 2	Les dites cariatides bis	
2005	Cléo from 5 to 7: Remembrances and Anecdotes	Cléo de 5 à 7: souvenirs et anecdotes	
2015	The Three Buttons	Les 3 Boutons	

=== Television work ===
Year	Title	Credits
1970	Nausicaa	TV movie
1983	Une minute pour une image	TV documentary
2010	P.O.V., episode 3, season 23, The Beaches of Agnès	Also producer and cinematographer
2011	Agnès de ci de là Varda	TV documentary, 5 episodes

== Publications ==
- La Côte d'Azur, d'azur, d'azur, d'azur, collection Lieu-dit, Les éditions du Temps (1961) OCLC 9817787
- Varda par Agnès, Les Cahiers du Cinéma (1994, reprint 2005) OCLC 2866421450 ISBN 9782866421458
- Sans toit ni loi: un film d'Agnès Varda, L'Avant-scène Cinéma, 92 pp. (2003) OCLC 2847250220
- L'île et elle: Agnès Varda, Actes Sud, 81 pp. (2006) OCLC 2742762086 ISBN 9782742762088
- Les Plages d'Agnès: texte illustré du film d'Agnès Varda, collection Mémoires de César, éditions de l'Œil, 108 pp. (2010) OCLC 642213101 ISBN 2351370872
- Agnès Varda Interviews, University Press of Mississippi (2013–12) ISBN 9781617039201
- Agnès Varda: Director's Inspiration, DelMonico Books (2023-11-10) ISBN 9781636810607
- Viva Varda!, Editions de la Martinière (2023-10-06) ISBN 9791040112174
- Varda par Agnès - l'intégrale, Editions de la Martinière (2023-11-03) ISBN 9782732471525
