= Simone Bodmer-Turner =

Simone Bodmer-Turner is an artist and designer working in sculptures, lighting, and furniture. Her signature designs encompass one-tone organic materials and minimalism, inspired by artists like Valentine Schlegel and Savin Couelle. The designer typically works in ceramic and plaster.

== Early life and education ==
Bodmer-Turner was raised in Berkeley, California and Massachusetts and went on to study literature in college. Massachusetts after a long stint in New York. She joined Good Eggs in 2013, which is a farm-to-table sustainable food delivery start-up. While working there, the artist began studying ceramics and gained experience at Choplet, Gasworks, and Sculpture Space.

== Work ==
In 2018, she had established her own studio near the Brooklyn Navy Yard.

The artist showcased 25 new works, in particular furniture and lighting, in 2022 at Matter Projects. The works were a, "seasonless line of ceramic vases that draw on ancient ceremonial vessels and modern shapes," as stated by the artist.

During the summer of 2024, she exhibited bronze, wood-working and lacquer functional works at Emma Scully. There were andirons, bowls, lamps, and screens.

Bodmer-Turner as collaborated with urushi lacquer artist Yuko Gunji and Massachusetts-based woodworker Laura Pepper.

Much of her furniture and functional design work nods to artists like Isamu Noguchi, Alexander Calder, and Diego Giacometti.
