= Le Roi Lune =

Play written by Thierry Debroux

Le Roi Lune is a play by Belgian playwright Thierry Debroux. It was published in 2005 by Lansman and was performed the same year at the Théâtre du Méridien in Brussels.

== Summary ==
The play is based on Ludwig II of Bavaria, nicknamed the Mad King. Today, he is known for castles he built, but throughout his life, he pursued the ideals of beauty, nobility and purity.

The play tells of one of the famous suppers of Louis II, which he would spend alone, talking to himself. On the evening the play begins, Louis II had just heard of Wagner's death, and ruined by sorrow, he seeks comfort with a young man whom he loves with a passion. During the night, he speaks of his memories of the brilliant composer, confesses his homosexual nature, and sets off in search of the absolute beauty while mocking one of his ministers who formed a coup d'état to overthrow the crazy king; Louis II is then seen killing the minister by strangling him in a fit of fury.

Afterwards, the audience finds Louis II at the asylum; His nurse is the young man whom he had loved in the first part of the play, his doctor, the minister, during which it is expected that the audience realize the whole supper was imagined by the king. At the end, Louis II is pronounced dead from drowning (Though whether through murder, suicide, or accident is left to the audience to interpret.)

Once dead, Louis II finds his mistress, the moon, the play ending with these words, by Louis II: "The moon ... The moon ...".

== Staging ==
The play was performed worldwide in 2005 by the Théâtre du Méridien in co-production with the director and the playwright. It was also performed in July 2007 at the Festival d'Avignon, in September 2007 at the Théâtre du Lucernaire (Paris) and on tour in Belgium and throughout France in 2008.

- Directed by: Frédéric Dussenne
- Scenography: Marcos Viñals Bassols
- Costumes: Lionel Lesire
- Lighting: Renaud Ceulemans
- Distribution: Julien Roy, Alexandre Tissot, Benoît Van Dorslaer

=== Awards ===
- Prize for the best actor at the Prix du Théâtre 2005 for Julien Roy and Benoît Van Dorslaer ex aequo.
- Prize of the Parliament of the French Community / Wallonia-Brussels 2006

== See also ==
- Louis II of Bavaria
