= La Pointe Courte =

1955 French film

- Home media cover
- Directed by: Agnès Varda
- Written by: Agnès Varda
- Starring: Silvia Monfort; Philippe Noiret
- Cinematography: Louis Stein; Paul Soulignac; Louis Soulanes; Bernard Grasberg
- Edited by: Alain Resnais; Anne Sarraute
- Music by: Pierre Barbaud
- Release dates: May 1955 (Cannes); January 4, 1956 (France)
- Running time: 80 minutes
- Country: France
- Language: French
- Budget: $14,000

La Pointe Courte [la pwɛ̃t kuʁt] is a 1955 French drama film directed by Agnès Varda (in her directorial debut). It has been cited by many critics as a forerunner of the French New Wave, with the historian Georges Sadoul calling it "truly the first film of the nouvelle vague". The film was shot and takes place in Sète in the south of France, "La Pointe Courte" ("short point") being a tiny quarter of the town, known as the fisherman's village.

== Plot ==
In La Pointe Courte, the fishing quarter of the French Mediterranean port of Sète, the local Board of Health has prohibited the fisherman from harvesting shellfish from a small lagoon, saying it is contaminated with bacteria. The fishermen think politics, not safety, is behind the decision, however, and continue to fish wherever they want, flouting the rules and oversight with help from their families and community, while they make plans to independently test the water.

A young woman (named only as "she" or "her") arrives on the train from Paris to be with her husband (named only as "he" or "him"), who arrived five days earlier. She is from Paris, while he grew up in La Pointe Courte, but he has not been back for 12 years. The couple have found themselves drifting apart after four years of marriage, and, although she says she only came to tell him that she wants a divorce, she agrees to stick around for a few days and talk about it.

A young fisherman, Raphäel Scotto, is caught breaking the rules by the coastal patrol, who report him. The wife and husband discuss their relationship while they wander around town, her describing her dissatisfaction that their love is not as exciting as it used to be, and him saying that love changes over time. One of the seven young children of a local single mother gets sick and dies.

When the police come to take Raphäel to Montpellier to serve his 5-day jail sentence, the officers allow him to collect his things alone and meet them at the train later, saving him the embarrassment of being seen with them. He passes the house of his girlfriend, Anna Soldino, and her father, Jules, becomes enraged when they smile at each other. Jules thinks Anna is too young to date, but her mother and grandparents think it is alright. The news comes that the water test is positive for bacterial contamination. There is suspicion of foul play, but some fishermen begin to avoid the small lagoon, if only to avoid getting hassled by the authorities.

Talking and spending time where her husband was raised helps the wife to understand him better, and she begins to change her mind about leaving him. They go to the local water jousts, which are held every Sunday in summer, and she is enchanted by the novelty, while he enjoys the nostalgia. Raphäel, who has only served three days of his jail sentence, was able to secure a temporary release to participate, and he acquits himself well, earning the approval of Jules.

That evening, there is a neighbourhood party. Raphäel and Anna dance together, and her family enjoy themselves, though they know that having fun does not solve their problems, which will all be waiting for them in the morning. The wife tells her husband that she has come to see the value of their more mature love and that they are bound to each other forever. They walk through the dance and, together, take the train back to Paris.

== Cast ==
- Silvia Monfort as Her
- Philippe Noiret as Him

The rest of the cast is made up of locals from Sète, such as Albert, Rossette, and André (Dédé) Lubrano, who portray one branch of the film's Soldino family, and Anna Banegas and Marcel Jouet, who play Anna Soldino and Raphäel Scotto, the young local couple in the film.

== Themes ==
In a 1962 interview, Varda spoke of the two narrative threads present in the film: "a couple reconsidering their relationship and a village that is trying to resolve several collective problems of survival". In her 2008 documentary film The Beaches of Agnès, she says the structure of La Pointe Courte was inspired by William Faulkner's 1939 novel The Wild Palms.

In the magazine Cineaste, film journalist Jonathan Kirshner pointed out methods and themes in La Pointe Courte that would recur in Varda's subsequent films, namely "a blend of documentary and fiction, detailed attentiveness to the economic conditions of the working class, subtle observations about the gender dynamics of social and familial relations, and, of course, the notable presence of cats."

== Production ==
Varda spent time in Sète during WWII. As an adult, she visited La Pointe Courte to take pictures for a friend who could no longer visit her home. After seeing the results, she rented a camera to shoot a film in the area about a couple from Paris who were visiting the husband's home town. The film's budget was $14,000, roughly one quarter that of films such as The 400 Blows (1959) and Breathless (1960). The cast and crew were not paid at the time of filming, instead being given partial ownership of the film as members of a co-op, and therefore receiving a share of any future income generated by its sale or screening. Artist Valentine Schlegel, a friend of Varda's, served as the film's artistic advisor.

== Release ==
La Pointe Courte was first screened at the Cannes Film Festival in May 1955. Its premiere in Paris took place on January 4, 1956, at the Studio Parnasse, on a bill with Jean Vigo's 1930 short documentary film À propos de Nice.

=== Home media ===
The Criterion Collection released the film in a four-DVD Region 1 box-set titled "4 by Agnès Varda" in January 2008. The other films in the set were Cléo from 5 to 7 (1962), Le Bonheur (1965), and Vagabond (1985).
