= Black Panthers (film) =

1968 short documentary film directed by Agnès Varda

- Directed by: Agnès Varda
- Cinematography: David Myers; Agnès Varda
- Production company: Cine-Tamaris
- Release date: 1968
- Running time: 28 minutes
- Countries: France; United States
- Language: English

Black Panthers is a 1968 short documentary film directed by Agnès Varda.

The film focuses on the Black Panther Party in Oakland, California, during protests over the arrest of Black Panther co-founder Huey P. Newton for the murder of police officer John Frey in 1967.

== Summary ==
Title screen

In the summer of 1968, people arrive in Oakland to protest Huey P. Newton's arrest. Newton is interviewed and talks about his poor treatment while incarcerated and talks about the ideals of the Black Panther movement which includes protecting the black community from the police, informing them of their rights, and taking advantage of license to carry firearm laws in order to arm Panthers against the police.

Other people are interviewed, including Kathleen Cleaver who talks about the natural hair movement and the increasing importance of women in positions of authority in the Black Panther movement. The film ends with Newton's conviction for manslaughter and a hate crime involving two police officers shooting the window of a Black Panther office where Newton's picture had been hung in the front window.

== Cast ==
- Bill Brent
- Huey P. Newton
- Stokely Carmichael
- Eldridge Cleaver
- Kathleen Cleaver

== Development ==
Varda and her crew shot the film in 1968 during her time in California while her husband Jacques Demy was in Hollywood working on Model Shop.

== Release ==
The film premiered at the 1968 Venice Film Festival. The Criterion Collection released the film as part of the Eclipse box set Agnès Varda in California in 2015. It was also included in their The Complete Films of Agnès Varda box set released in 2020.

== Reception ==
In 2020, Eric Kohn of IndieWire wrote of the film: "Viewed from a contemporary perspective, as the streets light up with the fury over yet more injustices against black people by the police, Black Panthers is timelier than ever, and a welcome antidote to blaring media headlines — a movie that goes beyond gawking at anger and frustration to highlight its genuine purpose."
