= Daguerréotypes =

1976 documentary film by Agnès Varda

- French theatrical release poster
- Directed by: Agnès Varda
- Starring: Agnès Varda; Rosalie Varda; Mystag the Magician
- Cinematography: Nurith Aviv
- Edited by: Andrée Choty; Gordon Swire
- Distributed by: ZDF
- Release date: 1976
- Running time: 80 minutes
- Country: France
- Language: French

Daguerréotypes is a 1976 French documentary film directed by Agnès Varda. The film consists of vignettes capturing life on Rue Daguerre, a street in Paris where Varda lived.

== Production ==
At the time of filming, Varda was caring for her two-year-old son and could not travel far from her home. Consequently, the entire film was shot within a 90-metre (300 ft) radius of her residence, the maximum length of the electric cables powering her equipment.

== Synopsis ==
The film profiles various shopkeepers and residents of Rue Daguerre, many of whom came from outside Paris or even outside France. Each subject is asked a series of three recurring questions: "Where did you come from?", "When did you get here?", and "Why did you come?"

== Title and themes ==
The title Daguerréotypes is a pun referring both to the street Rue Daguerre—named after Louis Daguerre, the inventor of the daguerreotype photographic process—and to the idea of "types". In a voiceover, Varda describes the subjects as her "types", referencing typologies as both a photographic and social concept. The film critiques these systems of classification, and several scenes feature subjects posed in the style of 19th-century portrait photography.

== Reception ==
On review aggregator website Rotten Tomatoes, the film holds an approval rating of 100% based on 11 reviews, with an average rating of 8.6/10.
