= Villeneuve-sur-Fère =

- Commune
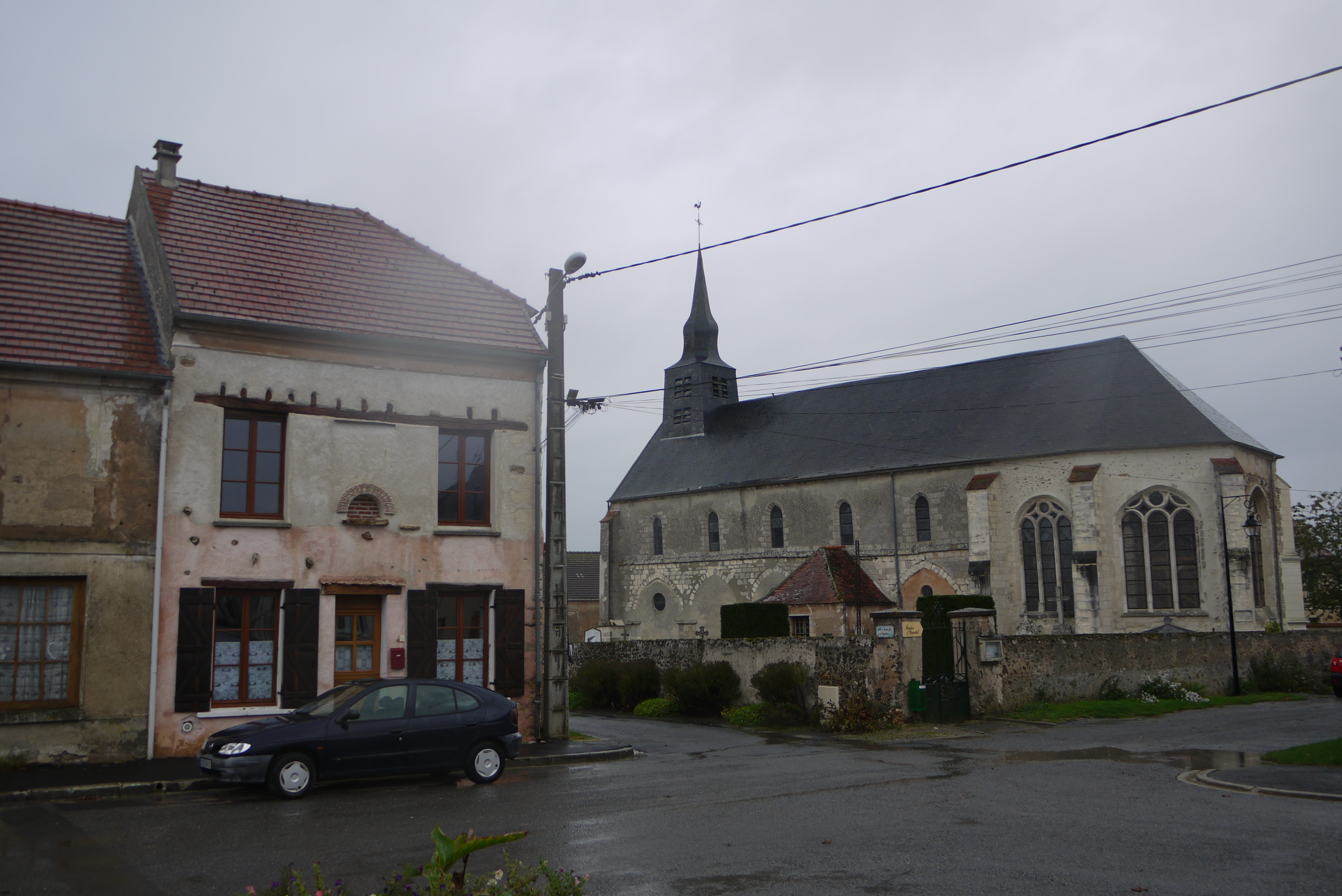
- The church of Villeneuve-sur-Fère
- Location of Villeneuve-sur-Fère
- Location within France Location within Hauts-de-France
- Coordinates: 49°10′42″N 3°28′33″E
- Country: France
- Region: Hauts-de-France
- Department: Aisne
- Arrondissement: Château-Thierry
- Canton: Château-Thierry
- Intercommunality: CA Région de Château-Thierry

Government
  - Mayor (2026–32): Thérèse Dalle
- Area^{1}: 10.3 km^{2} (4.0 sq mi)
- Elevation: 160 m (520 ft)
- Highest elevation: 226 m (741 ft)
- Lowest elevation: 118 m (387 ft)
- Population (2023): 277
  - Density: 26.9/km^{2} (69.7/sq mi)
- Time zone: UTC+01:00 (CET)
  - Summer (DST): UTC+02:00 (CEST)
- INSEE/Postal code: 02806 /02130
- ^{1} French Land Register data, which excludes lakes, ponds, glaciers > 1 km^{2} (0.386 sq mi or 247 acres) and river estuaries.

Villeneuve-sur-Fère is a commune in the Aisne department in Hauts-de-France in northern France.

== Population ==
Historical population
Year	Pop.	±% p.a.
1968	260	—
1975	263	+0.16%
1982	260	−0.16%
1990	239	−1.05%
1999	231	−0.38%
2007	283	+2.57%
2012	268	−1.08%
2017	285	+1.24%
2023	277	−0.47%
Source: INSEE

== Notable people ==
The commune was the birthplace of Camille Claudel (1864-1943), sculptor, and her brother Paul Claudel (1868–1955), poet and diplomat.

== See also ==
- Communes of the Aisne department
