= Jacquot de Nantes =

1991 film

- Directed by: Agnès Varda
- Written by: Agnès Varda; Jacques Demy
- Produced by: Agnès Varda
- Starring: Philippe Maron
- Cinematography: Patrick Blossier
- Edited by: Marie-Josée Audiard
- Music by: Joanna Bruzdowicz
- Distributed by: AMLF
- Release date: 6 September 1991
- Running time: 118 minutes
- Country: France
- Language: French

Jacquot de Nantes is a 1991 French coming of age and drama film directed by Agnès Varda. It was screened out of competition at the 1991 Cannes Film Festival.

The film is a portrait of the making of an artist; recreating the early life of Varda's husband, Jacques Demy, in Occupied France and his interest in the various crafts associated with filmmaking, such as casting, set design, animation and lighting. The fictional sections set in wartime Nantes are matched with brief documentary interludes involving Demy.

== Cast ==
- Philippe Maron - Jacquot 1
- Edouard Joubeaud - Jacquot 2
- Laurent Monnier - Jacquot 3
- Brigitte De Villepoix - Marilou, la mere
- Daniel Dublet - Raymond, le pere
- Clément Delaroche - Yvon 1
- Rody Averty - Yvon 2
- Hélène Pors - Reine 1
- Marie-Sidonie Benoist - Reine 2
- Jérémie Bernard - Yannick 1
- Cédric Michaud - Yannick 2
- Julien Mitard - Rene 1
- Jérémie Bader - Rene 2
- Guillaume Navaud - Cousin Joel
- Fanny Lebreton - La petite refugee

== Production ==
Filming locations included Nantes and Chantenay-Villedieu (Sarthe).

== Reception ==
On the review aggregator website Rotten Tomatoes, the film holds an approval rating of 83%, based on 6 reviews, with an average rating of 7.3/10.
