= Elsa la rose =

- Directed by: Agnès Varda
- Written by: Agnès Varda
- Starring: Louis Aragon; Elsa Triolet; Michel Piccoli
- Cinematography: Willy Kurant; William Lubtchansky
- Music by: Simonovitch; Ferrat; Moussorgsky; Gershwin; Handy
- Production company: Pathé film
- Distributed by: Ciné-Tamaris
- Release date: October 23, 1966 (France)
- Running time: 16 minutes
- Country: France
- Language: French

Elsa la rose is a 1965 short documentary film by Agnès Varda about Elsa Triolet and Louis Aragon's relationship.

== Summary ==
The documentary films the two writers, telling their story and their memories, from Elsa Triolet's youth to when she met with Louis Aragon, whilst a voice (Michel Piccoli) reads Aragon's poems about Elsa.

== Cast ==
- Elsa Triolet as herself
- Louis Aragon as himself
- Michel Piccoli as the voice-over

== Development ==
The film was shot in Elsa and Louis' home in Saint-Arnoult-en-Yvelines and in the Bar du dôme at Montparnasse during June 1965.

== Release ==
The film is shot during the year 1965, but was only first seen on television on 23 Octobre 1966 during a show called “Dim Dam Dom” on ORTF second channel.
