= Varda by Agnès =

2019 film by Agnès Varda

- Film poster from Spanish release
- Directed by: Agnès Varda
- Release date: 2019

Varda by Agnès (French: Varda par Agnès) is a 2019 documentary television series directed by Agnès Varda. The last film Varda directed, Varda by Agnes features Varda watching and discussing her films and work. She recounts her 60-year artistic journey through photography and filmmaking. She expresses the importance of three key words: inspiration, creation, and sharing. The film shows Varda sitting and reflecting on the things she loves, such as her husband, cats, colors, beaches, and heart-shaped potatoes.

== Reception ==
On review aggregator Rotten Tomatoes, the film holds an approval rating of 98% based on 91 reviews, with an average rating of 8.4/10. The website's critical consensus states: "An encomium that should prove illuminating for casual viewers and satisfying for fans, Varda by Agnès finds a brilliant filmmaker looking back on her own terms". On Metacritic, the film has a weighted average score of 85 out of 100, based on 24 critics, indicating "universal acclaim".
