= Paul Claudel =

French diplomat, poet and playwright (1868–1955)

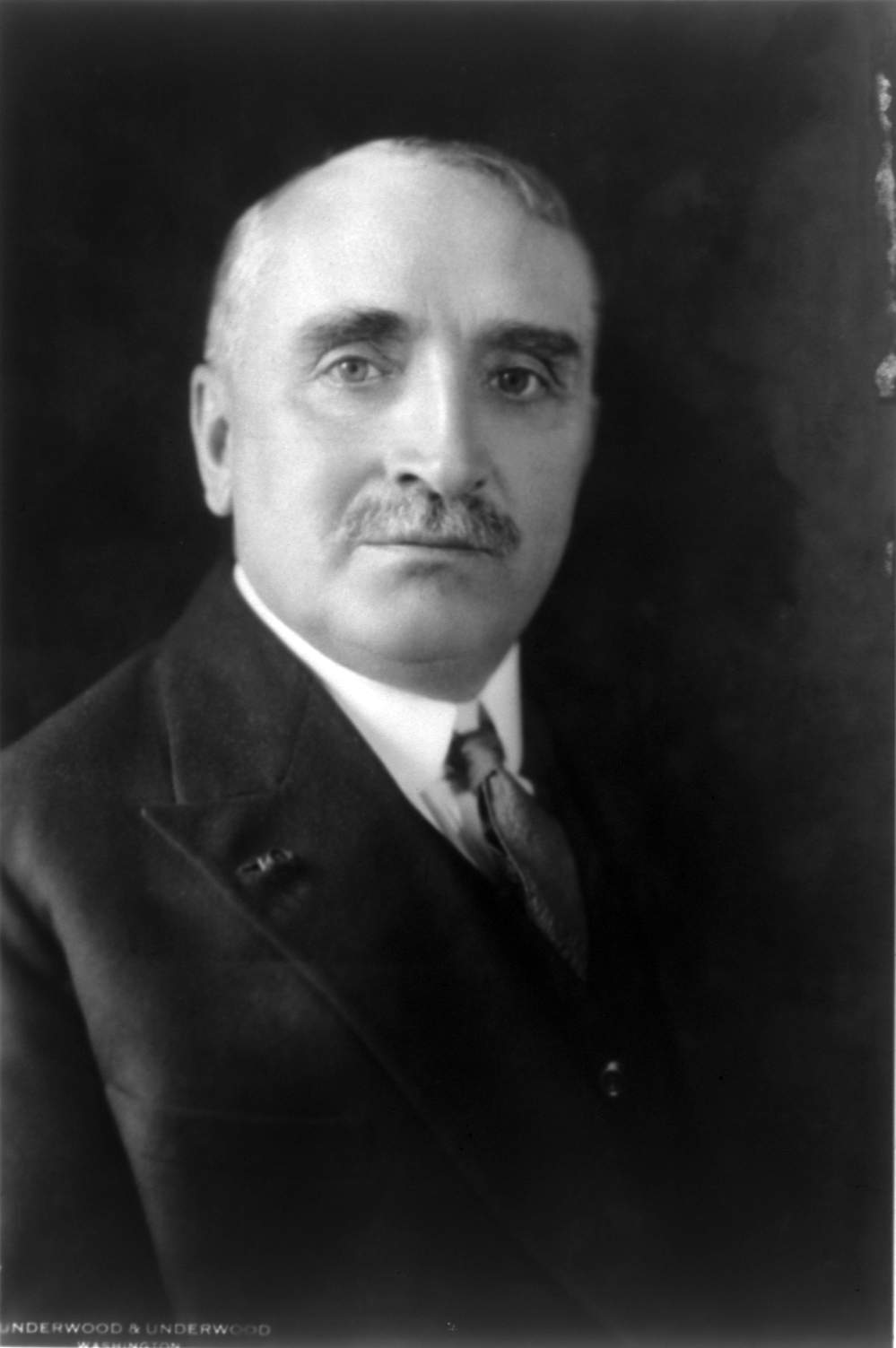
- Born: 6 August 1868; Villeneuve-sur-Fère, French Empire
- Died: 23 February 1955 (aged 86); Paris, France
- Education: Lycée Louis-le-Grand; Paris Institute of Political Studies
- Spouse: Reine Sainte-Marie Perrin
- Relatives: Camille Claudel (sister)
- Writing career
- Language: French
- Genre: Verse drama
- Notable works: Partage de midi (1905); Le Soulier de satin (1929); L'Histoire de Tobie et de Sara (1942)

Signature
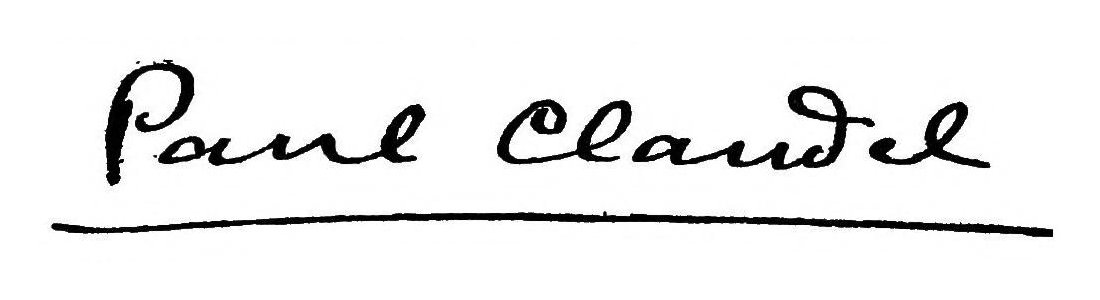

Paul Claudel (French: [pɔl klodɛl]; 6 August 1868 – 23 February 1955) was a French poet, dramatist and diplomat, and the younger brother of the sculptor Camille Claudel. He is most famous for his verse dramas, which often convey his devout Catholicism, and for institutionalizing his sister.

== Early life ==
He was born in Villeneuve-sur-Fère (Aisne), into a family of farmers and government officials. His father, Louis-Prosper, dealt in mortgages and bank transactions. His mother, the former Louise Cerveaux, came from a Champagne family of Catholic farmers and priests. Having spent his first years in Champagne, he studied at the lycée of Bar-le-Duc. In 1881 his mother moved the family to Paris for further education. His father stayed in the north, working to support them. There Paul studied at the Lycée Louis-le-Grand.

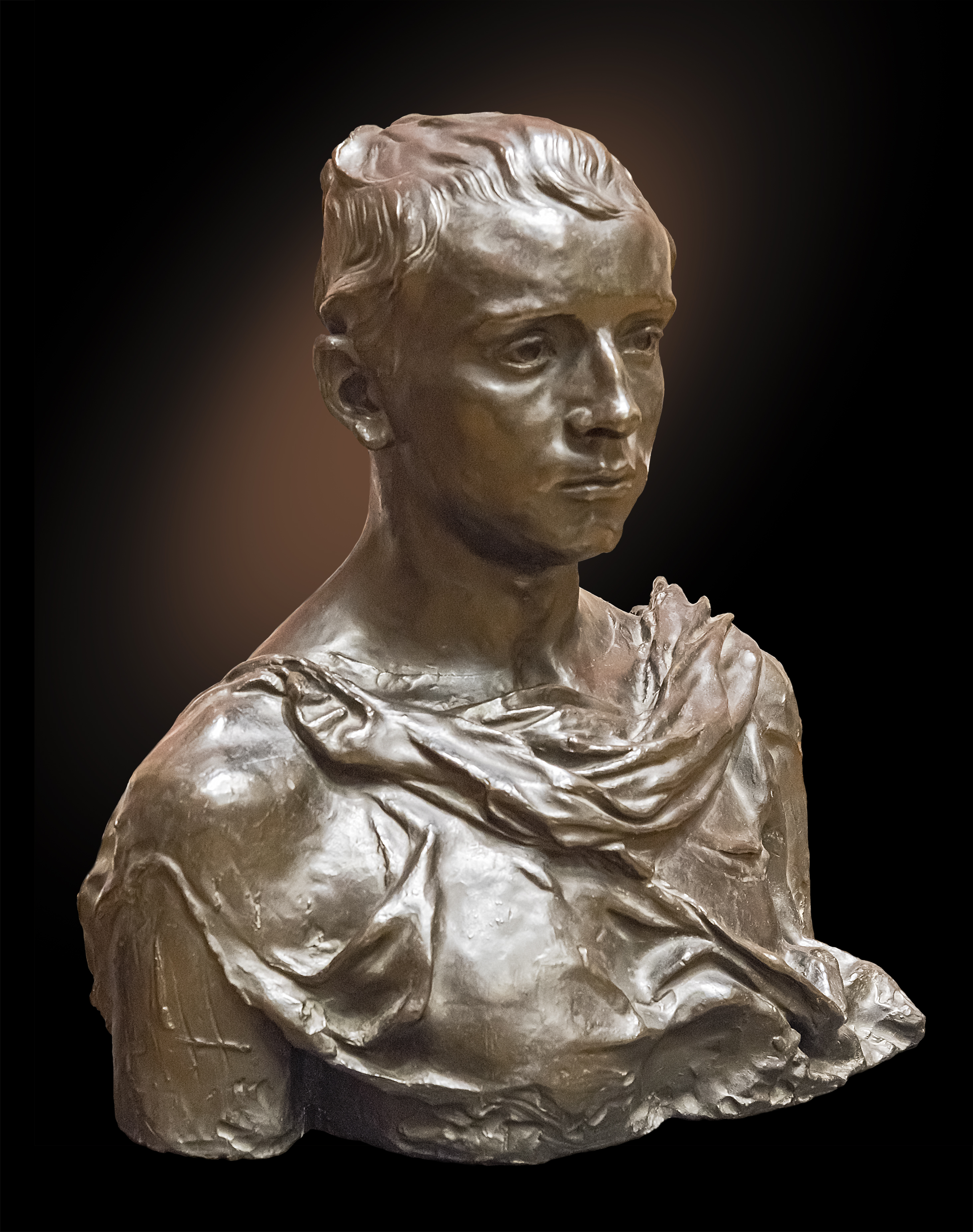
Paul Claudel, age sixteen, by his sister, Camille Claudel, modeled in 1884 and cast in 1893

An unbeliever in his teenage years, Claudel experienced a conversion at age 18 on Christmas Day 1886 while listening to a choir sing Vespers in the cathedral of Notre-Dame de Paris: "In an instant, my heart was touched, and I believed." He remained an active Catholic for the rest of his life. In addition, he discovered Arthur Rimbaud's book of poetry Illuminations. He worked towards "the revelation through poetry, both lyrical and dramatic, of the grand design of creation".

Claudel studied further at the Paris Institute of Political Studies.

== Diplomat ==
The young Claudel considered entering a monastery, but instead had a career in the French diplomatic service. He entered it at age 25, serving from 1893 to 1936.

Claudel was first vice-consul in New York (April 1893), and later in Boston (December 1893). He was French consul in China during the period 1895 to 1909, with time in Shanghai (June 1895). On a break in 1900, he spent time at Ligugé Abbey, but his proposed entry to the Benedictine Order was postponed.

Claudel returned to China as vice-consul in Fuzhou (October 1900). He had a further break in France in 1905–6, when he married. He was one of a group of writers enjoying the support and patronage of Philippe Berthelot of the Foreign Ministry, who became a close friend; others were Jean Giraudoux, Paul Morand and Saint-John Perse.

Because of his position in the Diplomatic Service, at the beginning of his writing career Claudel published either anonymously or under a pseudonym, "since permission to publish was needed from the Ministry of Foreign Affairs".^{:11}

For that reason, Claudel remained rather obscure as an author until 1909; he was unwilling to ask permission to publish under his own name because the permission might be refused.^{:11} In that year, the founding group of the Nouvelle Revue Française (NRF), and in particular his friend André Gide, a poet, were keen to recognise his work. Claudel sent them, for the first issue, the poem Hymne du Sacre-Sacrement, to glowing praise from Gide, and it was published under his name.

He had not sought permission to publish, and there was a furore in which he was criticised. In February of that year, attacks based on his religious views were affecting production of one of his plays.^{:15–17} Berthelot's advice was to ignore the critics.^{:18 note 42} This marked the beginning of Claudel's long collaboration with the NRF.^{:12}

Claudel also wrote extensively about China from his diplomatic experience. A definitive version of his Connaissance de l'Est was published in 1914 by Georges Crès and Victor Segalen. In his final posting to China, he had served as consul in Tianjin (1906–1909).

In a series of European postings leading up to the outbreak of World War I, Claudel was in Prague (December 1909), Frankfurt am Main (October 1911), and Hamburg (October 1913). In this period he was also interested in the theatre festival at Hellerau, which produced one of his plays, and the ideas of Jacques Copeau.

During and soon after the war, Claudel's postings ranged widely: Rome (1915–1916), ministre plénipotentiaire in Rio de Janeiro (1917–1918), Copenhagen (1920), ambassador in Tokyo (1921–1927), Washington, D.C. (1928–1933, Dean of the Diplomatic Corps in 1933) and Brussels (1933–1936).

While serving in Brazil during World War I, he supervised the continued provision of food supplies from South America to France. His secretaries during the Brazil mission included Darius Milhaud, who wrote incidental music to a number of Claudel's plays.

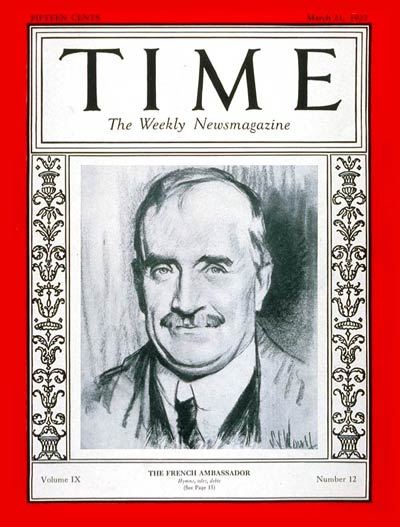
Cover of Time Magazine (21 March 1927)

== Later life ==
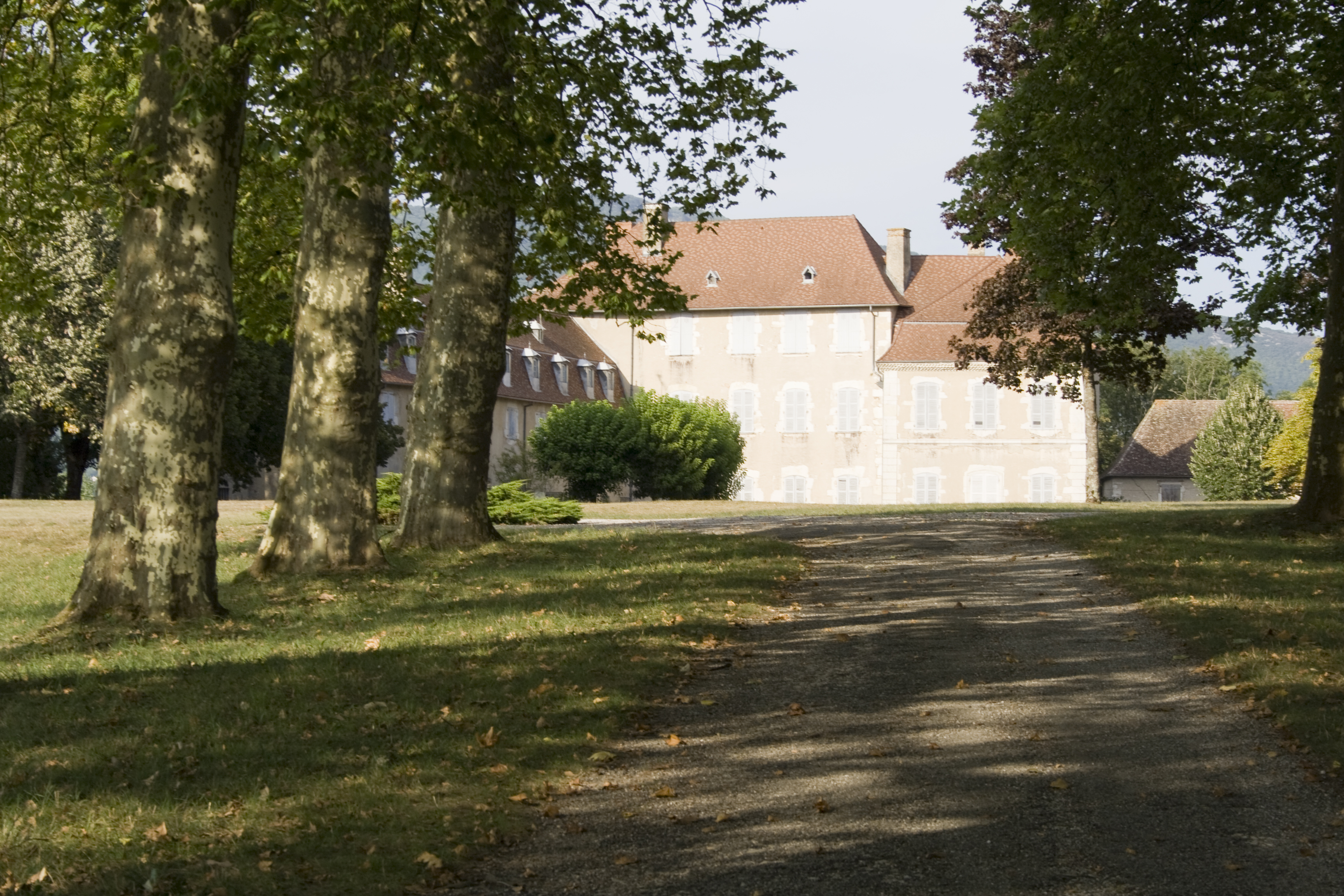
The château of Brangues, 2009 photograph

In 1932, Claudel was appointed as an honorary vice president of the American Friends of Lafayette.

In 1935 Claudel retired to Brangues in Dauphiné, where he had bought a château in 1927. He still spent winters in Paris.

During World War II, Claudel made his way to Algeria in 1940, after the Battle of France when German troops occupied Paris. He offered to serve Free France. Not having a response to the offer, he returned to Brangues. He supported the Vichy regime, but disagreed with Cardinal Alfred Baudrillart's policy of collaboration with Nazi Germany.

Close to home, Paul-Louis Weiller, married to Claudel's daughter-in-law's sister, was arrested by the Vichy government in October 1940. Claudel went to Vichy to intercede for him, to no avail. Weiller escaped (with Claudel's assistance, the authorities suspected) and fled to New York.

Claudel wrote in December 1941 to Isaïe Schwartz, the Great Rabbi of France, expressing his opposition to the Statut des Juifs enacted by the regime. The Vichy authorities responded by having Claudel's house searched and keeping him under observation.

Claudel was elected to the Académie française on 4 April 1946, replacing Louis Gillet. This followed his having been rejected 1935, which was considered somewhat scandalous, when Claude Farrère was preferred. His writing was well regarded, as he was nominated for the Nobel Prize in Literature in six different years.

== Literary works ==
Claudel often referred to Stéphane Mallarmé as his teacher. His poetic has been seen as Mallarmé's, with the addition of the idea of the world as a revelatory religious text. He rejected traditional prosody, developing the verset claudelien, his own form of free verse. It was within the orbit of experimentation by followers of American poet Walt Whitman, a strong influence for Claudel. Charles Péguy and André Spire were two other Frenchmen working on a form of verset. The influence of the Latin Vulgate has been disputed by Jean Grosjean.

The best known of his plays include Le Partage de Midi ("The Break of Noon", 1906) and L'Annonce faite à Marie ("The Tidings Brought to Mary", 1910). The latter explores themes of sacrifice, oblation and sanctification through the tale of a young medieval French peasant woman who contracts leprosy. Le Soulier de Satin ("The Satin Slipper", 1931) explores human and divine love and longing, and is set in the Spanish Empire of the siglo de oro (Golden Age). It was staged at the Comédie-Française in 1943.

Jeanne d'Arc au Bûcher ("Joan of Arc at the Stake", 1939) was an oratorio, with music by Arthur Honegger. The settings of his plays tended to be romantically distant, medieval France or sixteenth-century Spanish South America. He used scenes of passionate, obsessive human love. The complexity, structure and scale of the plays resulted in a delay in appreciation of his work by general audiences. His final dramatic work, L'Histoire de Tobie et de Sara, was first produced by Jean Vilar for the Festival d'Avignon in 1947.

In addition to his verse dramas, Claudel wrote lyric poetry. A major example is the Cinq Grandes Odes (Five Great Odes, 1907). Boštjan Marko Turk's doctoral thesis examined the influence of medieval philosophy on Paul Claudel's poetic work, particularly Les Cinq Grandes Odes. He summarized his findings in the monograph Paul Claudel et l'Actualité de l'être (2011). This was recognized by Dominique Millet-Gérard, his doctoral advisor, for its contribution to understanding Claudel's work in the French-speaking world.

== Views and reputation ==
Claudel was a conservative of the old school, sharing the antisemitism of conservative Catholic France. But he also opposed discriminatory laws passed by Germany and Vichy France.

After the fall of France in 1940, he addressed a poem ("Paroles au Maréchal," "Words to the Marshal") commending Marshal Pétain for, as he described it, picking up and salvaging France's broken, wounded body. As a conservative Catholic, Claudel did not regret the fall of the anti-clerical French Third Republic.

His diaries expressed his consistent contempt for Nazism (condemning it as early as 1930 as "demonic" and "wedded to Satan," and referring to communism and Nazism as "Gog and Magog"). He wrote an open letter to the World Jewish Conference in 1935, condemning the Nuremberg Laws as "abominable and stupid." His support for Charles de Gaulle and the Free French forces culminated in his victory ode addressed to de Gaulle when Paris was liberated in 1944.

The British poet W. H. Auden acknowledged the importance of Paul Claudel in his poem "In Memory of W. B. Yeats" (1939). Writing about Yeats, Auden says in lines 52–55 (from the originally published version; these were excised by Auden in a later revision):

Time that with this strange excuse
Pardoned Kipling and his views,
And will pardon Paul Claudel,
Pardons him for writing well

George Steiner, in The Death of Tragedy, called Claudel one of the three "masters of drama" in the 20th century, along with Henry de Montherlant and Bertolt Brecht.

== Family ==
While in China, Claudel had a long affair with Rosalie Vetch née Ścibor-Rylska (1871–1951), wife of Francis Vetch (1862–1944) and granddaughter of Hamilton Vetch. Claudel knew Francis Vetch through his diplomatic work, and had met Rosalie on a sea voyage out from Marseille to Hong Kong in 1900. She had four children, and was pregnant with Claudel's child when the affair ended in February 1905. Francis Vetch and Claudel had caught up with Rosalie at a railway station on the German border in 1905, a meeting at which Rosalie signalled that her relationship with Claudel was over. She married in 1907 Jan Willem Lintner. Louise Marie Agnes Vetch (1905–1996), born in Brussels, was Claudel's daughter by Rosalie.

Claudel married on 15 March 1906 Reine Sainte-Marie Perrin (1880–1973). She was the daughter of Louis Sainte-Marie Perrin (1835–1917), an architect from Lyon known for completing the Basilica of Notre-Dame de Fourvière. They had two sons and three daughters.

=== Treatment of his sister Camille ===
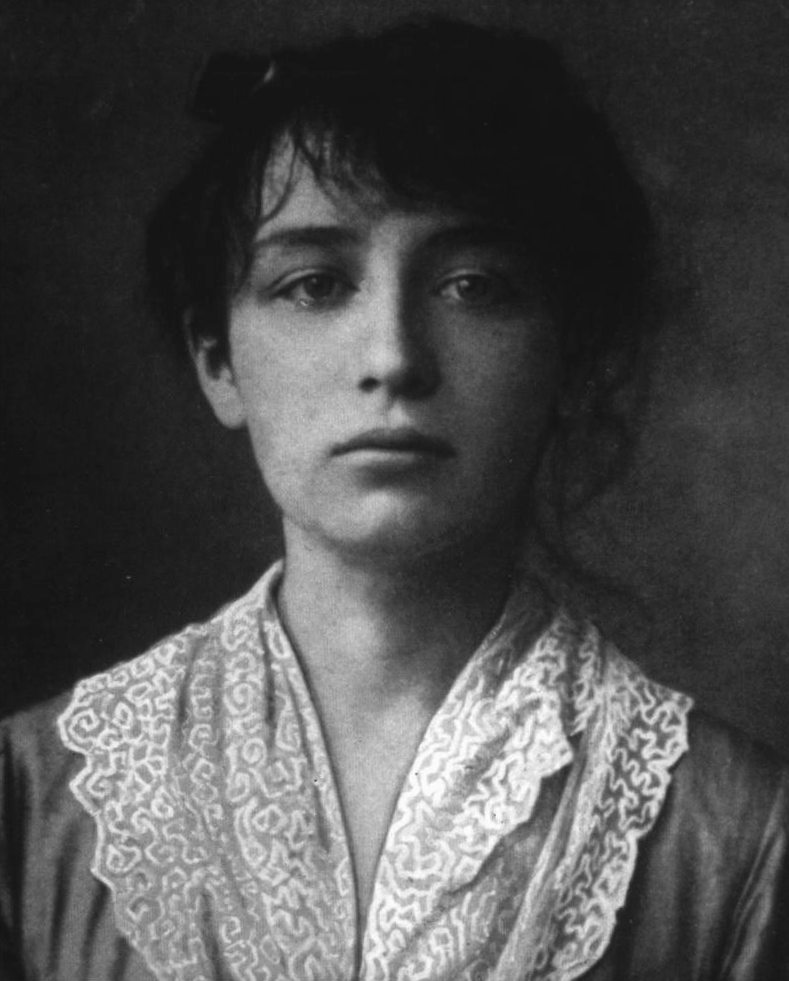
Camille Claudel

Claudel committed his sister Camille to a psychiatric hospital in March 1913, where she remained for the last 30 years of her life. He visited her seven times in those 30 years. Records show that while she did have mental lapses, she was clear-headed while working on her art. Doctors tried to convince the family that she need not be in the institution, but still they kept her there.

The story forms the subject of a 2004 novel by Michèle Desbordes, La Robe bleue, The Blue Dress. Jean-Charles de Castelbajac wrote a song "La soeur de Paul" for Mareva Galanter, 2010.

== Honours and awards ==
- Grand Croix of the Order of Legion of Honour
- Order of Isabella the Catholic

== See also ==
- Camille Claudel, 1988 film
- Camille Claudel 1915, 2013 film
- L'Annonce faite à Marie, film adaptation
- L'Histoire de Tobie et de Sara
- Lycée Claudel, a French language high school in Ottawa, Canada, named after him

== Sources ==
- Thody, P.M.W. "Paul Claudel", in The Fontana Biographical Companion to Modern Thought, eds. Bullock, Alan and Woodings, R.B., Oxford, 1983.
- Ayral-Clause, Odile, Camille Claudel, A Life, 2002.
- Ashley, Tim: "Evil Genius", The Guardian, 14 August 2004.
- Price-Jones, David, "Jews, Arabs and French Diplomacy: A Special Report", Commentary, 22 May 2005, https://web.archive.org/web/20051218141558/http://www.benadorassociates.com/article/15043
- Album Claudel. Iconographie choisie et annotée par Guy Goffette. Bibliothèque de la Pléiade. Éditions Gallimard, 2011. ISBN 9782070123759. (Illustrated biography.)
