= Théâtre National Populaire =

People's National Theater
- Théâtre national populaire
- Palais du travail
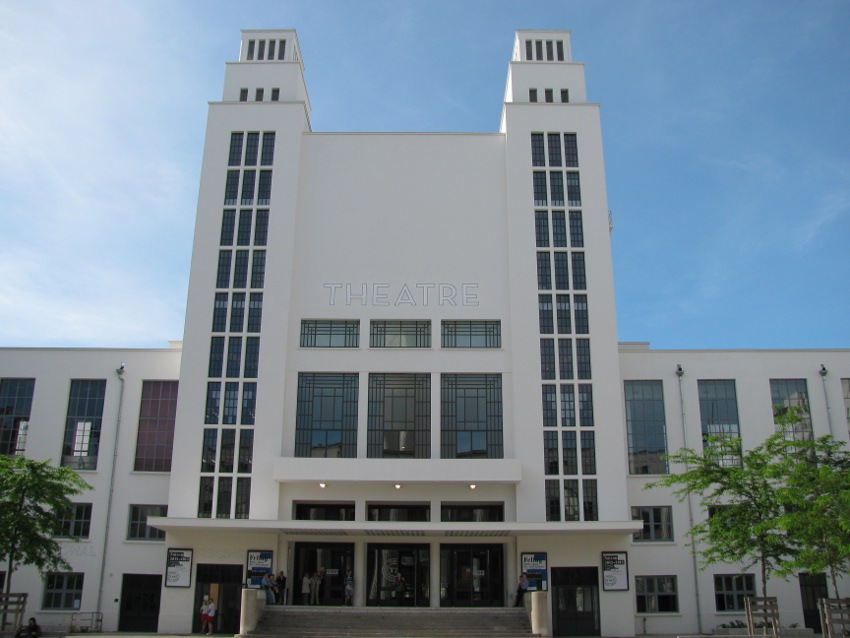
- The People's National Theater, place-Lazare Goujon
- Interactive map of People's National Theater
- Address: Villeurbanne; France
- Capacity: 871
- Type: Drama

Website
- www.tnp-villeurbanne.com

The Théâtre national populaire (French pronunciation: [teɑtʁ nɑsjɔnal pɔpylɛːʁ]; "People's National Theater") is a theatre now at Villeurbanne, France. It was founded in 1920 by Firmin Gémier in Paris.

Today, the TNP has a company of ten resident actors and the building is currently being completely renovated.

== History ==
The Théâtre National Populaire (TNP) was founded in 1920 in Paris at the Palais de Chaillot by Firmin Gémier. During World War II, activity was suspended and the building was occupied by the United Nations.

In 1951, Jean Vilar was appointed head of the new theater by Jeanne Laurent. The theater reopened at Suresnes pending the return to the Palais de Chaillot. Vilar thought of the theater as a public service, and gave it a new image. Under his leadership the theater offered performances shown at prices and times to suit the general public. The TNP attracted a group of young actors including Gérard Philipe. Productions from this time include Le Cid and Der Prinz von Homburg by Heinrich von Kleist. Vilar hired the young composer Maurice Jarre as music director. Jarre scored 36 plays including the famous Lorenzaccio.

In 1963, Georges Wilson succeeded Vilar and created a second room devoted to contemporary writers.

In 1972 the French Minister of Cultural Affairs (Jacques Duhamel) decided to move the TNP to Villeurbanne, near Lyon. Specifically, to the Théâtre de la Cité, founded by Roger Planchon in 1957. Patrice Chéreau, Robert Gilbert and Roger Planchon took over leadership of the organization.

In 1986, Georges Lavaudant replaced Patrice Chéreau and shared the leadership with Roger Planchon until 1996. Then in 2002, the current director, Christian Schiaretti left the Comedy of Reims to lead the TNP.
