= The Beaches of Agnès =

- Theatrical release poster
- French: Les plages d'Agnès
- Directed by: Agnès Varda
- Written by: Agnès Varda
- Produced by: Agnès Varda
- Starring: Agnès Varda
- Cinematography: Hélène Louvart; Alain Sakot
- Edited by: Agnès Varda; Jean-Baptiste Morin; Baptiste Filloux
- Music by: Joanna Bruzdowicz; Stéphane Vilar; Paule Cornet
- Production companies: Ciné Tamaris; Arte France Cinéma
- Distributed by: Les Films du Losange; The Cinema Guild (US)
- Release dates: 3 September 2008 (Venice); 17 December 2008 (France)
- Running time: 112 minutes
- Country: France
- Language: French

The Beaches of Agnès (French: Les plages d'Agnès) is a 2008 French documentary film directed by Agnès Varda. The film is an autobiographical essay, in which Varda revisits places from her past, reminisces about her life and work, and celebrates her 80th birthday on camera. She said it would most likely be her last film, but subsequently released several projects, including the Oscar-nominated documentary Faces Places (2017).

== Style ==
Varda uses a wide variety of techniques, combining still images of people, including her past friends, collaborators, lovers, and family, with what Claude Lévi-Strauss might term bricolage of garage-sale items, trinkets, and colorful memorabilia juxtaposed in creative combinations, and combines beautiful images in a collage format which revolves around the theme of beaches. In the opening shots, she has assistants film her bringing mirrors to a beach in Belgium which she used to visit as a young girl; one mirror is on the sand as a wave washes over it. She captures a creative French artistic sensibility with a sincere and playful appreciation for the beauty of film and art and a joie de vivre.

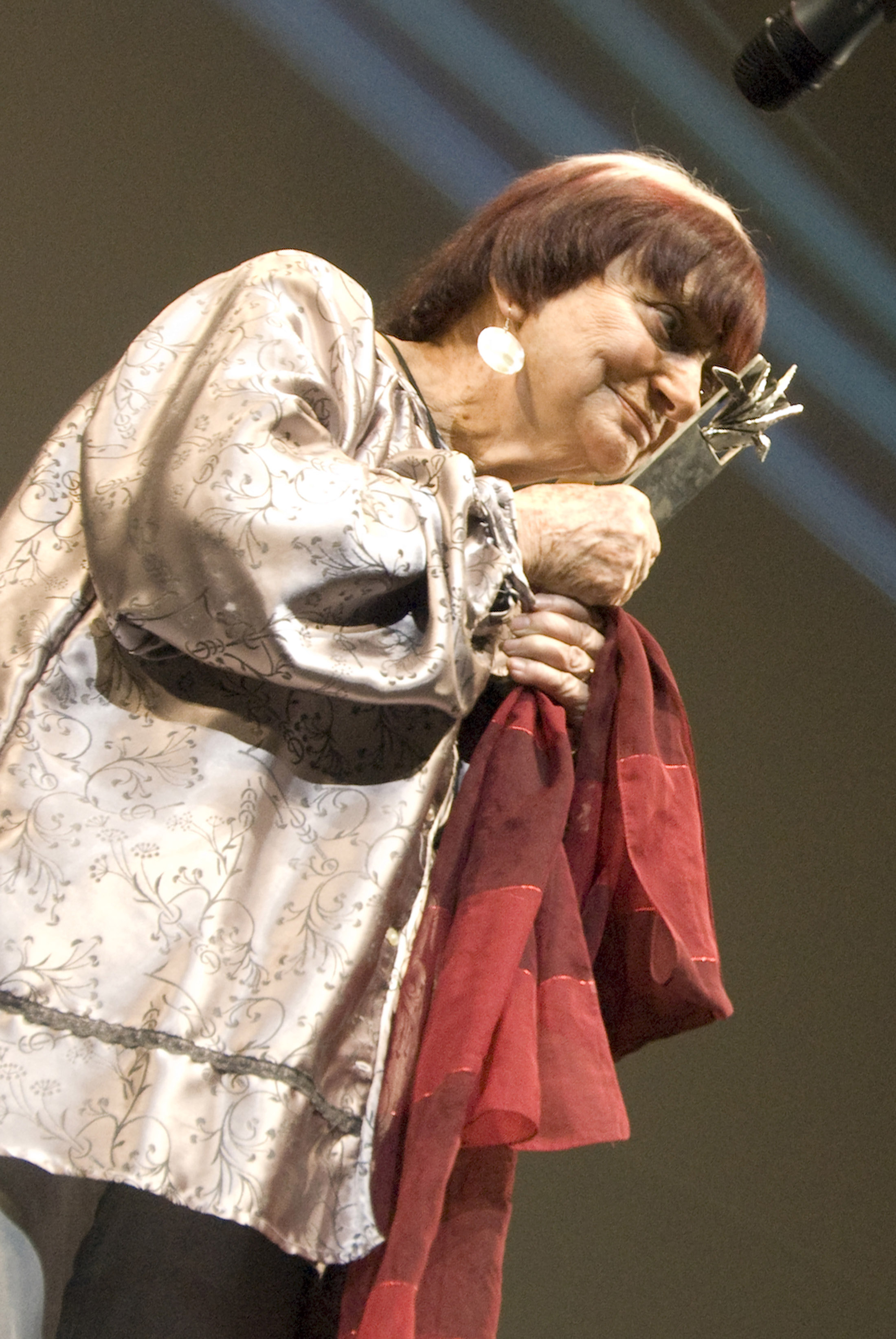
Agnes Varda, 2010

== Reception ==
The New York Times critic Manohla Dargis wrote in 2009:

It is at once an illustration of the fine art of foraging and an autobiographical portrait, narrated by its self-described “little old lady, pleasantly plump.” ... Ms. Varda is picking through the world, close to home and far afield, finding images that please her and give her pause ... that she scrutinizes with rue if no obvious regret. But here the emphasis is on her own life and the images and memories that, with time, have blurred together. ... The images are as delightful, unexpected and playfully uninhibited ... At one point, she says she thinks of all men who look at the sea as Ulysses (she’s an aquatic soul), but she’s every bit the wanderer. Whether she’s roving a beach with a camera or rummaging through flea markets, she seeks and finds, gleaning — the word means to collect and examine — what this world of wonders has in store.
