= L'Histoire de Tobie et de Sara =

L’Histoire de Tobie et de Sara is a three-act theatre play by Paul Claudel.

A first version was written in 1938, a second one in 1953. This play draws from the Book of Tobit.

== Mises en scène ==
- 1947 : Maurice Cazeneuve, 1st festival d’Avignon
- 1960 : Serge Ligier, Théâtre de l'Œuvre
- 1968 : Pierre Laroche, Théâtre national de Strasbourg
