= Jean Vilar =

French theatre director and actor (1912–1971)

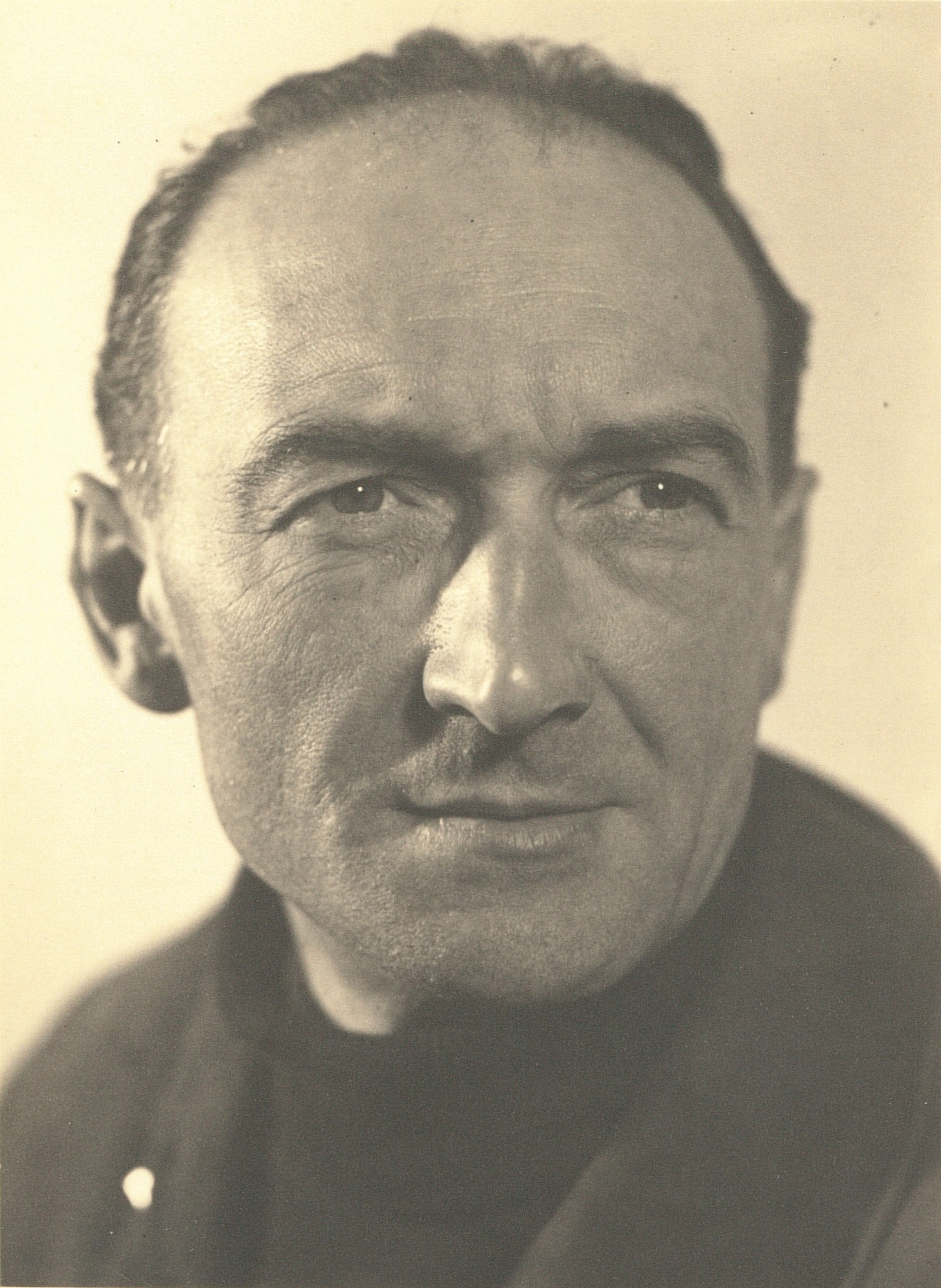
- Vilar in 1955
- Born: 25 March 1912; Sète, Hérault, France
- Died: 28 May 1971 (aged 59); Sète, Hérault, France
- Occupations: Actor and director

Jean Vilar (French pronunciation: [ʒɑ̃ vilaʁ]; 25 March 1912 – 28 May 1971) was a French actor and theatre director. He was the founder of the Festival d'Avignon and the Théâtre National Populaire.

== Career ==
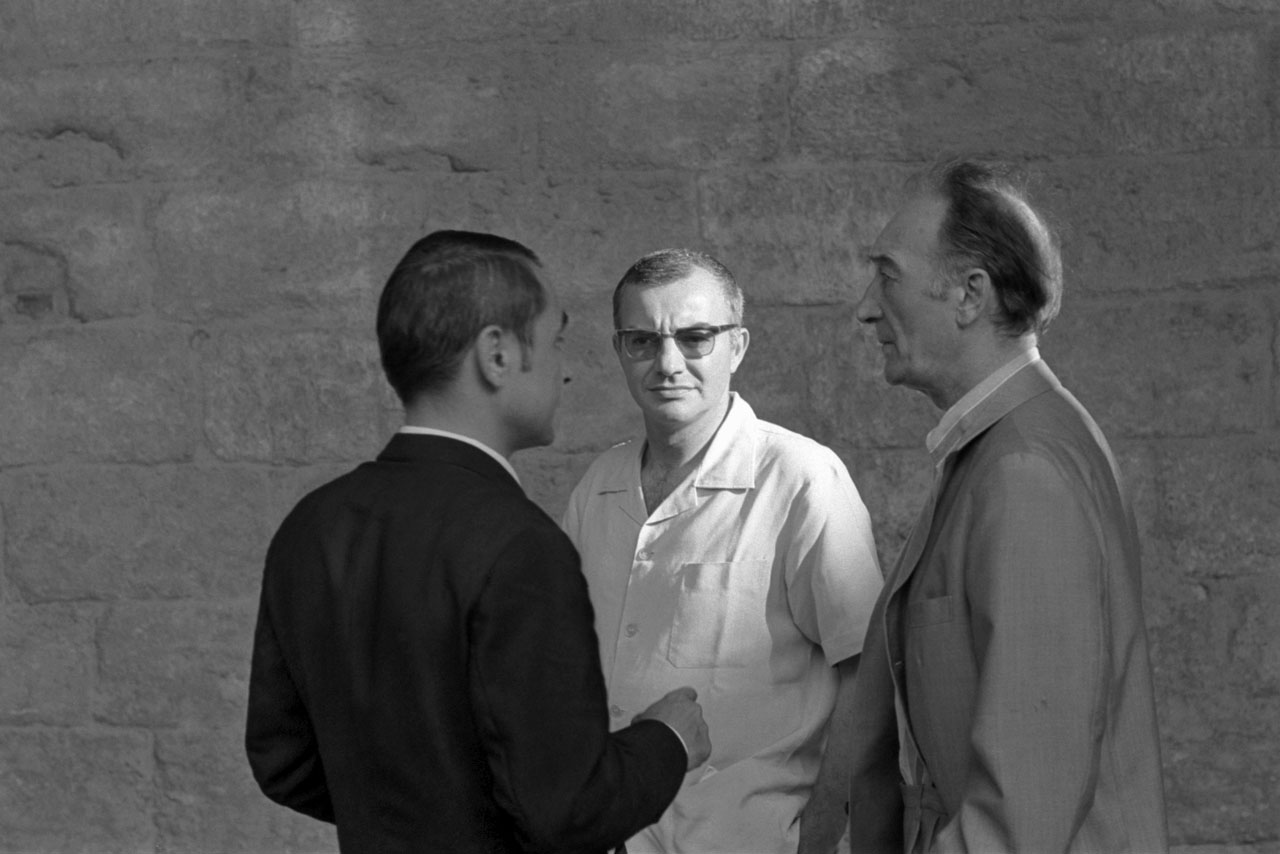
Vilar (right) in 1967 with Antoine Bourseiller (left), and François Billetdoux

Vilar trained under actor and theatre director Charles Dullin, then toured with an acting company throughout France. His directorial career began in 1943 in a small theatre in Paris. In 1947, he accepted an invitation to direct the first annual drama festival at Avignon.

Frustrated with what he felt was the narrow élitist horizons of the theatre, he devoted himself to creating a "people's theatre" and became a dominant force in the decentralization of theatre. He created two major theatrical institutions, the Festival d'Avignon and the Théâtre National Populaire. His policy was to make theatre accessible to the greatest possible number of people.

== Commemoration ==
Like Paul Valery, he is buried in the Cimetiere Marin, Sete. On 18 July 1979 the theatre department of the Bibliothèque nationale de France, the city of Avignon and the Association Jean Vilar opened the Maison Jean-Vilar in the Hôtel de Crochans in Avignon to further Vilar's work, the Festival d'Avignon, the 'OFF' and theatre and performance in Avignon and the surrounding region.

== Personal life ==
He was married to the artist Andrée Vilar (1916-2009) and worked with his sister in law Valentine Schlegel at the Festival d'Avignon.

== Filmography ==
Year	Title	Role	Notes
1946	Gates of the Night	Le clochard / La fortune	
1947	The Sharks of Gibraltar	Percy Carters	
1948	The Bouquinquant Brothers	Le prêtre	
1948	Carrefour du crime	Inspecteur Dominique	
1948	Bagarres	L'innocent	
1949	Les eaux troubles	Ulysse	
1949	La ferme des sept péchés	L'homme gris / Grey man	
1950	Thirst of Men	Le typographe	
1950	Justice Is Done	Le prêtre à l'imprimerie	
1951	Casabianca	Submarine Commandant Jean L'Herminier	
1951	Les mousquetaires du roi		
1952	Jocelyn	Le supérieur du nouveau séminaire	
1956	Les Aventures de Till L'Espiègle	Le duc d'Albe	
1958	Arènes joyeuses		
1961	Enclosure	Narrator	Voice
1969	Des Christs par milliers	Jean	
1971	Raphael, or The Debauched One	Horace	
1971	Le petit matin	Paul	(final film role)

== Other sources ==
- Bardot, Jean Claude (1991) Jean Vilar. Paris: Colin.
- Shevtsova, Maria (2005) Jean Vilar in Fifty Key Theatre Directors, eds Mitter, S., & In Shevtsova, M., Routledge
- Téphany, J., & Barthes, R. (1995). Jean Vilar. Paris: Editions de l'Herne.
