= Festival d'Avignon =

Annual arts festival in France

Coordinates: 43.95054°N 4.807305°E

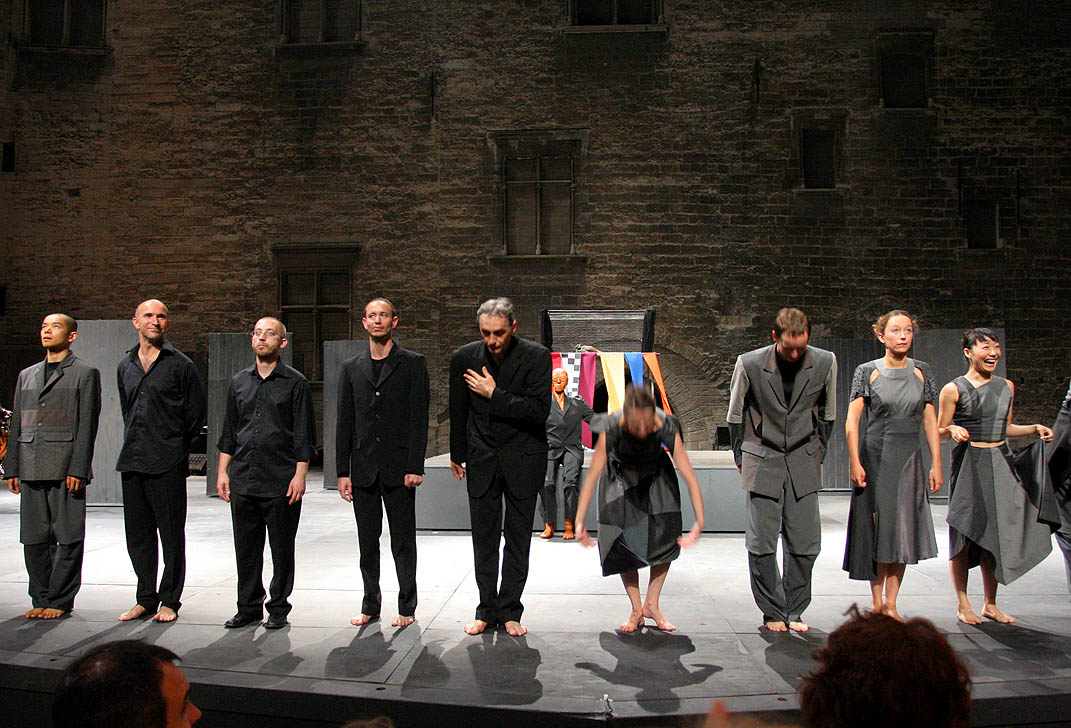
- A main venue of the 60th (2006) Avignon Theatre Festival staged at the Palais des Papes, featuring Asobu, a play by the festival artistic associate Josef Nadj (fifth from the left).
- Genre: Arts festival
- Frequency: Annually
- Location: Avignon
- Country: France
- Years active: 78–79
- Inaugurated: 1947
- Founder: Jean Vilar
- Website: www.festival-avignon.com

The Festival d'Avignon, or Avignon Festival (Occitan: Festival d'Avinhon), is an annual arts festival held in the French city of Avignon every summer in July in the courtyard of the Palais des Papes as well as in other locations of the city. Founded in 1947 by Jean Vilar, it is the oldest existent festival in France. Alongside the official festival, the "In" one, a number of shows are presented in Avignon at the same time of the year and are known as the "Off".

In 2008, some 950 shows were performed during three weeks.

== The Birth of a Festival ==
=== 1947, The Week of Scenic Arts ===
Art critic Christian Zervos and poet René Char organized a modern art exhibition held in the main chapel of the Pope's Palace in Avignon. In that setting, they asked Jean Vilar, actor, director, theatre director, and future festival founder, to present Meurtre dans la cathédrale which he adapted in 1945.

After refusing, Vilar proposed three plays: William Shakespeare's Richard II, a play almost unknown in France at that time, La Terrasse de midi, by Maurice Clavel, then unknown author, and L'Histoire de Tobie et de Sara by Paul Claudel.

== The "In" Festival ==
The festival is organised by a non-profit organisation (since 1980), which is administered by a board of trustees composed of: the French state, the city of Avignon, the Département of Vaucluse, the Région Provence-Alpes-Côte d'Azur, and seven public figures competent in the field of theatre. Amongst other places, the "In" Festival is performed in the "Cour d'Honneur" – the honours courtyard – of the Palais des Papes, the place of residence of the Avignon papacy during most of the 14th century.

== The "Off" Festival ==
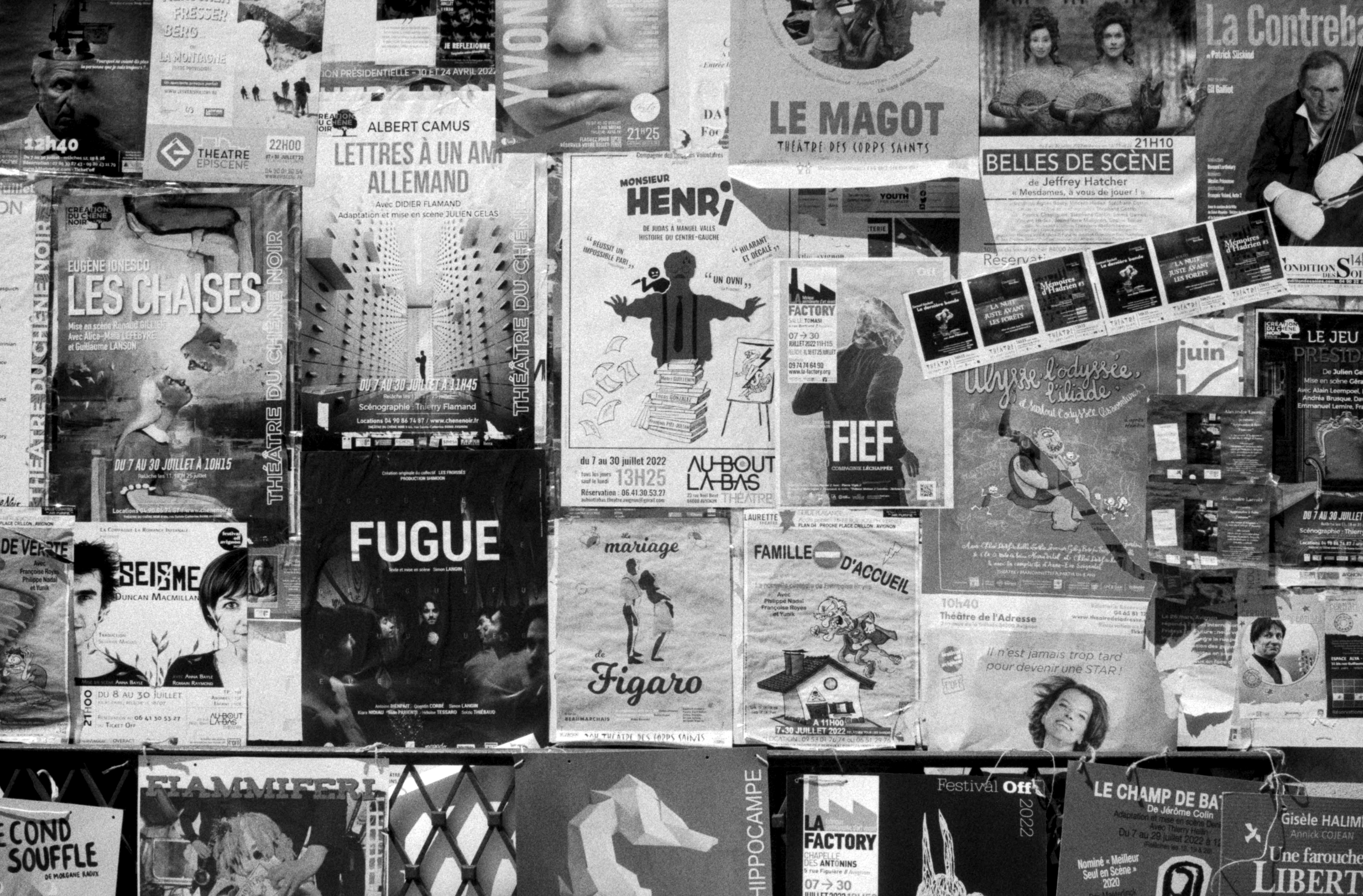
Theater posters, near the Palais des Papes d'Avignon, advertising productions of the 2022 Festival "Off." This scene is commonplace, during and leading up to the festival.

The "Off" festival is also organised by a non-profit organisation composed mostly of theatre companies and is performed in theaters schools, streets and all places suitable for performing.

== History ==
The Festival d'Avignon was founded by Jean Vilar in 1947. He was invited to present his first great successful play – Murder in the Cathedral by T. S. Eliot in the Palace of the Popes. At the same moment and at the same place, an exhibition of contemporary paintings and sculptures was organized by Christian Zervos, an art critic and collector, and by René Char, the poet.

Vilar initially refused the invitation, as for him the Cour d'Honneur of the Pope's Palace was too vast and "shapeless" and he also lost the performance rights of the play. However, he proposed three creations: Shakespeare's Richard II, one of Bard's plays that was little known at the time in France; Paul Claudel's Tobie et Sara ('Tobie and Sara'), and Maurice Clavel's second play, La Terrasse de Midi ('The Midday Terrace'). The first Festival d'Avignon in September 1947 set the scene as a showcase for unknown work and modern scripts.

Upon obtaining initial success, the festival began enjoying the contribution of many young talents. Among the actors and actresses invited by Vilar, one finds the following: Jean Négroni, Germaine Montero, Alain Cuny, Michel Bouquet, Jean-Pierre Jorris, Silvia Montfort, Jeanne Moreau, Daniel Sorano, Maria Casarès, Philippe Noiret, Monique Chaumette, Jean Le Poulain, Charles Denner, Jean Deschamps, Georges Wilson, and Gérard Philipe.

The festival's success grew, in spite of criticisms, which were at times virulent. Vilar's idea of a "popular theatre" moved critics to refer to Vilar as "Stalinist", "fascist", "populist", or "cosmopolitan".

On the other hand, Vilar's conception of the theatre remained conservative with respect to competing conceptions developed especially in the course of the 1960s. On the crest of the wave of contemporary tendencies to revolutionize theatrical practices, in 1966 Avignon's Théâtre des Carmes, co-founded by André Benedetto and Bertrand Hurault, staged a festival "Off", unofficial and independent. The following year, Benedetto's theatre was joined by other kindred theatrical companies.

In response to the "Off" challenge, in 1967 Jean Vilar gave rise to the festival of La Cour d'honneur du Palais des papes ("Court of Honor of the Popes' Palace"). Thenceforth, numerous further sites will be chosen to stage the festival's theatrical representations.

Vilar directed the festival until his death in 1971. In that year, Vilar's "In" festival included thirty-eight shows.

In 1991, two years after Samuel Beckett’s death, a French judge ruled that productions of Waiting for Godot with female casts would not cause excessive damage to Beckett's legacy, and allowed the play to be performed by the all-female cast of the Brut de Beton theater company at the festival, although an objection by Beckett's representative had to be read before each performance.

=== 2020 edition and COVID-19 pandemic ===
The 2020 edition was cancelled because of the COVID-19 pandemic.

== Strikes during the Festival ==
Due to the anti-authoritarian protest movements of May 1968, the 22nd edition of the Festival of Avignon hosted virtually no French shows, halving the number of planned shows down from a total of 83. Relatively unaffected were the shows of the "Living Theatre", Maurice Béjart's representations at the Court of Honor, as well as various film viewings taking advantage of that same year's cancellation of the Festival of Cannes.

Béjart's show of 19 July in the Court of Honor was disrupted by Saul Gottlieb, a viewer who entered the stage to order Béjart to halt his show. Towards the end of the show, the comedians of the "Théâtre du Chêne Noir," from the "Off" festival, erupted on the scene, forcing Béjart's dancers to improvise around them.

In 2003, a total of 750 shows were anticipated, prior to the festival's being cancelled for the year due to strikes by the show business's "casual workers" ("intermittents") protesting to reform indemnification laws. Approximately one hundred of the "Off" festival's shows were cancelled, as well.

On 3 July 2014, the festival committee voted by a 224–110 margin (4 votes of abstention) in favor of a strike during the event in support of the recent claims of the intermittent workers about their unemployment insurance.

== Research archives ==
Archives on the works of Jean Vilar and the totality of the 3,000 representations programmed by the Festival of Avignon since its 1947 debut are conserved at Maison Jean-Vilar, located in Avignon at 8, rue de Mons, Montée Paul-Puaux. The Maison houses most notably a library, videotheque, expositions and database.

The Association Jean Vilar publishes the review journal, Les Cahiers Jean Vilar, which inscribes the thought of the festival's ideator in a resolutely contemporary context, analysing the place of theatre in society, as well as political stakes involved in theatrical production.
