= My Three Angels =

My Three Angels may refer to:

- My Three Angels (play), a 1953 comedy play by Samuel and Bella Spewack
- My Three Angels (film), a 1962 Australian television adaptation of the play
