= Théâtre Édouard VII =

Theatre in Paris, France

Coordinates: 48.8713°N 2.3294°E

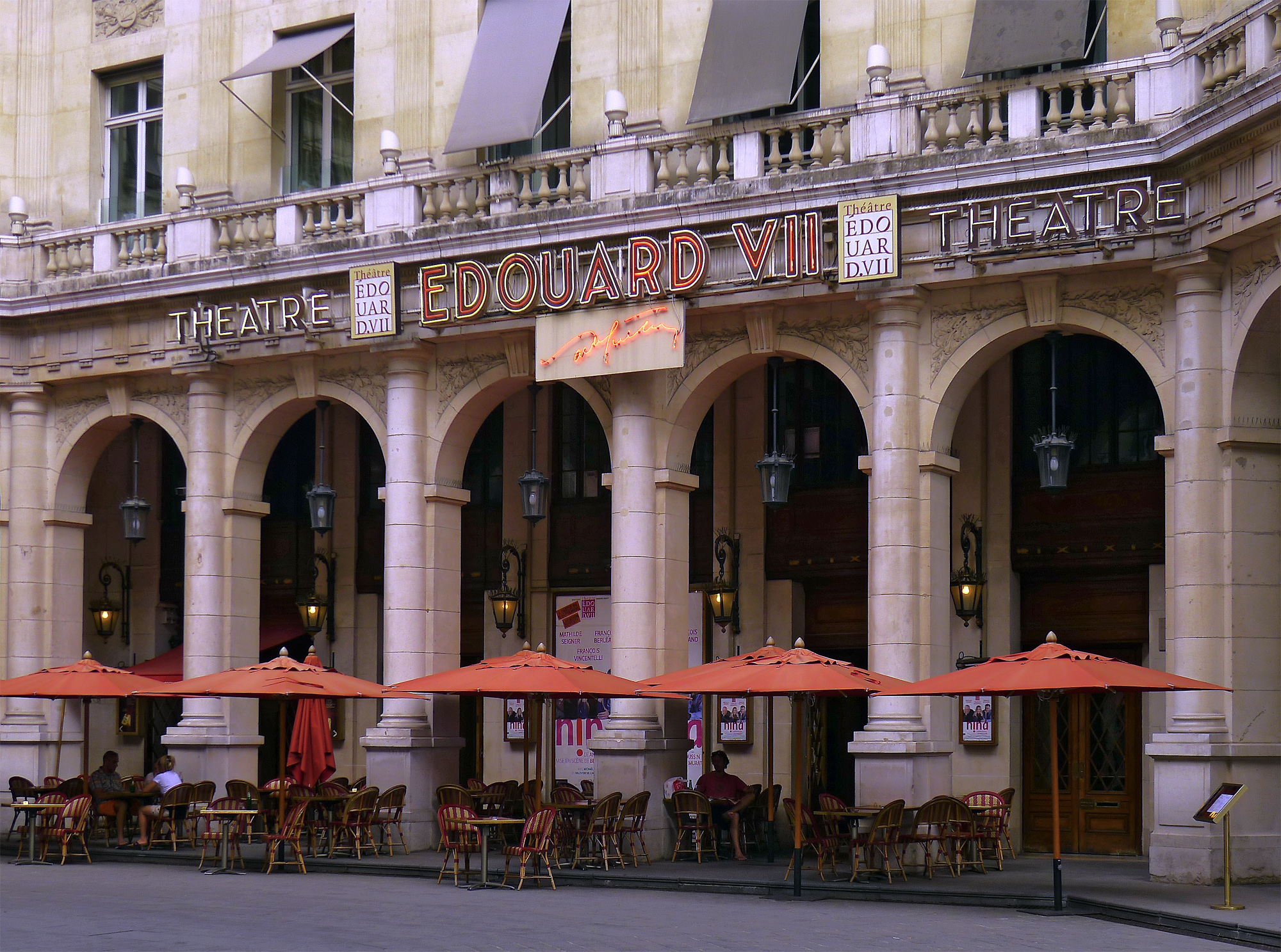
- Théâtre Édouard VII in 2013
- Interactive map of the Théâtre Édouard VII area

General information
- Location: 9th arrondissement of Paris, France
- Inaugurated: 1913

Other information
- Seating capacity: 718

Website
- http://www.theatreedouard7.com

The Théâtre Édouard VII, also called théâtre Édouard VII – Sacha Guitry, is located in Paris between the Madeleine and the Palais Garnier in the 9th arrondissement. The square, in which there is a statue of King Edward VII, was opened in 1911. The theatre itself, which was originally a cinema, was named in the honour of Edward VII, as he was nicknamed the "most Parisian of all Kings", appreciative of French culture. In the early to mid 1900s, under the direction of Sacha Guitry, the theatre became a symbol of Anglo-French friendship, where French people could discover and enjoy English works.

French actor and director Bernard Murat is the current director of the theatre. Modern "boulevard comedies" and vaudevilles are often performed there, and subtitled in English by the company Theatre in Paris.

Important figures in the arts, cinema and theatre have performed there, including Orson Welles, Eartha Kitt, and more. Pablo Picasso created props for a play at the Théâtre Édouard VII in 1944.

== 1916: Alphonse Franck ==
- 1916: All right revue in 2 acts and 14 tableaux by Rip
- 1917: La Folle Nuit ou Le Dérivatif musical by André Mouëzy-Éon and Félix Gandéra, music Marcel Pollet
- 1917: Son Petit Frère, two acts operetta by André Barde, music Charles Cuvillier
- 1917: Le Feu du voisin by Francis de Croisset
- 1917: La Jeune Fille au bain by Louis Verneuil
- 1917: La Petite Bonne d'Abraham, three acts biblical tale by André Mouëzy-Éon and Félix Gandéra, music by Marcel Pollet
- 1917: Il le faut ! by René Berton, Manon en voyage by Jules Massenet and Claude Terrasse, Rien qu'un by André Pascales (one act play and comic opera)
- 1919: Phi-Phi by Albert Willemetz and Henri Christiné
- 1919: Le Loup dans la bergerie 3 acts tale by Georges Manoir and Armand Verhyle after Balzac
- 1919: L'Enfantement du mort by Marcel L'Herbier
- 1920: L'École des satyres
- 1920: L'Erreur d'une nuit d'été by Philippe Maquet
- 1920: Je t'aime by Sacha Guitry
- 1921: Le Comédien by Sacha Guitry
- 1921: Le cœur dispose by Francis de Croisset
- 1921: Le Grand Duc by Sacha Guitry
- 1921: Faisons un rêve by Sacha Guitry
- 1921: Jacqueline by Sacha Guitry, after Henri Duvernois
- 1922: Jean de La Fontaine by Sacha Guitry
- 1922: Une petite main qui se place by Sacha Guitry
- 1922: Seul by Henri Duvernois
- 1922: Le Misanthrope by Molière
- 1923: Un sujet de roman by Sacha Guitry
- 1923: L'Amour masqué comédie musicale by Sacha Guitry and André Messager
- 1923: Le Lion et la poule by Sacha Guitry
- 1924: La Danseuse éperdue by René Fauchois
- 1924: L'Âge de raison by Paul Vialar
- 1924: L'École des femmes by Molière, directed by Lucien Guitry
- 1924: Une étoile nouvelle by Sacha Guitry
- 1925: On ne joue pas pour s'amuser by Sacha Guitry
- 1925: Mozart by Sacha Guitry, music Reynaldo Hahn
- 1926: A vol d'oiseau by Sacha Guitry and Albert Willemetz
- 1926: Souris d'hôtel by Paul Armont and Marcel Gerbidon
- 1926: The Co-Optimiste by Melville Gideon
- 1927: Knock Out by Jacques Natanson and Jacques Théry
- 1927: Désiré by Sacha Guitry
- 1927: Jean de La Fontaine by Sacha Guitry
- 1927: La Vagabonde by Colette
- 1928: Mariette ou Comment on écrit l'histoire by Sacha Guitry
- 1929: L'Amoureuse Aventure by Paul Armont and Marcel Gerbidon, directed by Jacques Baumer

== 1929: Louis Verneuil ==
In 1929, Alphonse Franck is succeeded by Louis Verneuil for six months.

- 1929: Mademoiselle ma mère by Louis Verneuil
- 1929: Azaïs by Louis Verneuil
- 1929: Le Grand Voyage by Robert Cedric Sherriff
- 1929: Tu m'épouseras ! by Louis Verneuil
- 1930: Miss France by Georges Berr and Louis Verneuil

== 1930: Maurice Lehmann ==
In 1930, Maurice Lehmann becomes new director until 1931 when the place runs again as a movie theatre.

- 1930: Le Rendez-vous by Marcel Achard
- 1930: L'Assemblée des femmes by Maurice Donnay after Aristophanes

== 1931: Victor Francen ==
- 1931: Les Trois Chambres by Henri-René Lenormand
- 1931: Monsieur de Saint-Obin by André Picard and Harold Marsh Harwood
- 1931: Déodat by Henry Kistemaeckers

== 1931: Alphonse Franck ==
At the end of the year 1931, Twentieth Century Fox takes over the movie theatre.

- 1938: L'Écurie Watson by Terence Rattigan, adaptation Pierre Fresnay and Maurice Sachs

== 1941: Robert Gallois ==
In 1940, theatre returns.

- 1940: L'Insoumise by Pierre Frondaie
- 1941: Marché noir by Steve Passeur, directed by Camille Corney
- 1941: Arsène Lupin by Francis de Croisset and Maurice Leblanc
- 1942: Les J3 ou la nouvelle école by Roger-Ferdinand, directed by Jacques Baumer
- 1942: Jeunesse by Paul Nivoix
- 1942: Une belle histoire by Guy Rotter
- 1942: L'Honnête Florentine by Henry Chabrol

== 1943: Jean-Michel Renaitour and Jacqueline Heusch ==
- 1943: L'Affranchi by Charles Méré
- 1943: La Tragédie d'Alexandre by Paul Demasy

== 1944: Pierre Béteille ==
- 1944: Le Roi Christine by Marcelle Maurette
- 1944: Andromaque by Jean Racine, directed by Jean Cocteau
- 1944: A Midsummer Night's Dream by William Shakespeare, adaptation Georges Neveux
- 1944: Les Plus Beaux Yeux du monde by Jean Sarment
- 1945: Sérénade à trois by Noël Coward
- 1945: Tristan et Iseult by Lucien Fabre, directed by Alfred Pasquali
- 1945: Les Dames de Niskala by Hella Wuolijoki
- 1946: Les Derniers Seigneurs by Roger Ferdinand, directed by Jacques Baumer
- 1946: Les Pères ennemis by Charles Vildrac, directed by Georges Vitaly
- 1946: The Dybbuk by Shalom Anski, directed by André Marcovici
- Bichon by Jean de Létraz, with Pierre Bertin
- Le Gâteau des Rois by Marcelle Capron
- 1947: Of Mice and Men adaptation by Marcel Duhamel after John Steinbeck, directed by Paul Œttly
- 1947: L'amour vient en jouant by Jean Bernard-Luc, directed by Pierre-Louis
- 1947: Des hommes viendront, a play by Roger Saltel
- 1948: The Lame Devil by Sacha Guitry, directed by the author
- 1948: La Savetière prodigieuse after Federico García Lorca, directed by Pierre Bertin
- 1948: Joyeux Chagrins after Noël Coward, adaptation André Roussin and Pierre Gay, directed by Louis Ducreux
- 1948: Shéhérazade by Jules Supervielle, directed by Jean Vilar, Festival d'Avignon
- 1948: Les Enfants d'Édouard by Frederic Jackson and Roland Bottomley, adaptation Marc-Gilbert Sauvajon, directed by Jean Wall
- La Huitième Femme de Barbe-Bleue by Charlton Andrews, adaptation Alfred Savoir
- 1949: Le Silence de la mer after Vercors, directed by Jean Mercure
- 1949: A Streetcar Named Desire by Tennessee Williams, adaptation Jean Cocteau, directed by Raymond Rouleau
- 1950: Cabrioles by Roger Ferdinand
- 1950: Time Runs by Orson Welles after Faust by Dante, Milton, Christopher Marlowe, directed by the author
- 1950: The Blessed and the damned and The Unthinking Lobster by Orson Welles, directed by the author
- 1950: Poof by Armand Salacrou, directed by Yves Robert
- 1950: Pourquoi pas moi by Armand Salacrou, directed by Jacques Dumesnil
- 1950: Le Château du carrefour by Odette Joyeux
- 1951: L'Ile heureuse by Jean-Pierre Aumont, directed by Pierre Dux
- 1951: Ce monde n'est pas fait pour les anges by Pascal Bastia
- 1951: Tapage nocturne by Marc-Gilbert Sauvajon, directed by Jean Wall

== 1951: Elizabeth Hijar ==
- 1951: The Innocents by William Archibald, directed by Roland Piétri
- 1951: Ombre chère by Jacques Deval, directed by the author
- 1953: Demeure chaste et pure by George Axelrod, adaptation Jacques Deval, directed by Jacques Deval
- 1954: Souviens-toi mon amour by André Birabeau, directed by Pierre Dux
- 1955: Il y a longtemps que je t'aime by Jacques Deval, directed by Jean Le Poulain
- 1955: Isabelle et le pélican by Marcel Franck, mise en scène Marc Camoletti
- 1955: Témoin à charge by Agatha Christie, directed by Pierre Valde
- 1955: Le Système deux by Georges Neveux, directed by René Clermont
- 1955: Fric-Frac by Édouard Bourdet,
- 1955: La Cuisine des anges by Albert Husson, directed by Christian-Gérard
- 1955: Zamore by Georges Neveux, directed by Henri Soubeyran
- 1956: La Nuit du 4 août by Albert Husson, directed by Christian-Gérard
- 1956: Le mari ne compte pas by Roger-Ferdinand, directed by Jacques Morel
- 1957: Une femme trop honnête by Armand Salacrou, directed by Georges Vitaly
- 1957: Le monsieur qui a perdu ses clefs by Michel Perrin, directed by Raymond Gérôme

== 1958: Raymond Rouleau ==
- 1958: Oncle Otto by Jacques Mauclair, directed by the author
- 1958: Nous entrerons dans la carrière by René Catroux, directed by Raymond Rouleau
- 1958: Virage dangereux by John Boynton Priestley, directed by Raymond Rouleau

== 1958: Claude Génia ==
Starting in 1958, Claude Génia becomes responsible for the theatre and introduces new notable plays such as L'Année du bac, Jours heureux, Bonheur, impair et passe... and a new generation of actors like Sami Frey, Francis Nani, Jacques Perrin, Roger Dumas, Juliette Gréco, Daniel Gélin, Michel de Ré, Jean-Louis Trintignant, Marthe Mercadier, Jean Le Poulain...

- 1958: Lady Godiva by Jean Canolle, directed by Michel de Ré
- 1958: L'Enfant du dimanche by Pierre Brasseur, directed by Pierre Valde
- 1958: L'Année du bac by José-André Lacour, directed by Yves Robert
- 1960: Carlota by Miguel Mihura, adaptation Emmanuel Robles, directed by Jacques Mauclair
- 1960: De doux dingues by Michel André after Joseph Carole, directed by Jean Le Poulain
- 1961: Huit Femmes by Robert Thomas, a remake of which was later realised by the film director François Ozon, Huit Femmes, directed by Jean Le Poulain
- 1962: Bichon by Jean de Létraz, directed by Jean Meyer
- 1963: Sémiramis by Marc Camoletti, directed by Michel de Ré
- 1963: L'Âge idiot by Jean Meyer, directed by Maurice Guillaud
- 1964: Bonheur, impair et passe by Françoise Sagan, directed by the author with Claude Régy
- 1964: Tim by Pol Quentin after Paul Osborn, directed by Jacques-Henri Duval
- 1964: Diary of a Madman by Nikolai Gogol, directed by François Perrot and Roger Coggio
- 1964: Le Deuxième Coup de feu by Robert Thomas, directed by Pierre Dux
- 1965: Pourquoi pas Vamos by Georges Conchon, directed by Jean Mercure
- 1965: Les Bargasses by Marc'O, directed by the author
- 1965: La Nuit de Lysistrata by Aristophanes, directed by Gérard Vergez
- 1965: Les Filles by Jean Marsan, directed by Jean Le Poulain
- 1965: Chat en poche by Georges Feydeau, directed by Jean-Laurent Cochet
- 1966: Faust by Christopher Marlowe, directed by Jean-Louis Andrieux

== 1966: Wilfrid Dodd ==
In 1967, Francis Veber presents his first play L'Enlèvement. Simone Valère and Jean Desailly play Double Jeu by Robert Thomas before Robert Lamoureux and Françoise Rosay introduce La Soupière, a comedy. Claude Dauphin is Shylock in The Merchant of Venice adaptation Thierry Maulnier before Elvire Popesco again plays La Mamma by André Roussin.

- 1966: Ange pur by Gaby Bruyère, directed by Francis Joffo
- 1966: Seule dans le noir by Frédéric Knott, adaptation Raymond Castans, directed by Raymond Rouleau
- 1966: La Polka des lapins by Tristan Bernard, directed by Nicole Anouilh
- 1967: Xavier by Jacques Deval, directed by Jacques-Henri Duval
- 1967: Frédéric by Robert Lamoureux, directed by Pierre Mondy
- 1968: Des enfants de cœur by François Campaux, directed by Christian-Gérard
- 1968: L'Amour propre by Marc Camoletti, directed by the author
- 1968: L'Enlèvement by Francis Veber, directed by Jacques Fabbri
- 1969: Voyage à trois by Jean de Létraz, directed by Robert Manuel
- 1969: L'Assassinat de Sister George by Franck Marcus, adaptation Jean Cau, directed by Andréas Voutsinas,
- 1969: Les Garçons de la bande by Mart Crowley, directed by Jean-Laurent Cochet

== 1970: Robert Thomas ==
- 1970: The Merchant of Venice by William Shakespeare, directed by Marcelle Tassencourt
- 1970: Double Jeu by Robert Thomas, directed by Jacques Charon
- 1971: Le Train de l'aube by Tennessee Williams, directed by Jean-Pierre Laruy
- 1971: La Soupière by Robert Lamoureux, directed by Francis Joffo and Robert Lamoureux
- 1971: Piège pour un homme seul by Robert Thomas, directed by Jacques Charon
- 1972: En avant... toute ! by Michel André, directed by Michel Roux
- 1974: La Mamma by André Roussin, directed by the author
- 1975: Viens chez moi, j'habite chez une copine by Luis Rego and Didier Kaminka, directed by Jean-Luc Moreau

=== Au théâtre ce soir ===
- 1974:
  - Hélène ou la Joie de vivre by André Roussin and Madeleine Gray, directed by René Clermont
  - Pluie by John Colton and Clemence Randolph after Somerset Maugham, adaptation E.R. Blanchet and Horace de Carbuccia, directed by René Clermont
- 1975:
  - Le Système Ribadier by Georges Feydeau, directed by Robert Manuel
  - Dix minutes d'alibi by Anthony Armstrong, adaptation Maurice Renault, directed by Jacques Ardouin
  - La Nuit du 16 janvier by Ayn Rand, adaptation Marcel Dubois, directed by André Villiers
  - La Complice by Jacques Rémy after a novel by Louis C. Thomas, directed by Jacques Ardouin
  - Trésor party by Bernard Régnier after P. G. Wodehouse, directed by Jacques Ardouin
  - Chat en poche by Georges Feydeau, directed by Jean-Laurent Cochet
  - Demandez Vicky by Marc-Gilbert Sauvajon after Alan Melville and Fred Schiller, directed by Jacques-Henri Duval
  - Le Pape kidnappé by João Bethencourt, adaptation André Roussin, directed by René Clermont
  - La Facture by Françoise Dorin, directed by Jacques Charon
  - Ah ! La Police de papa ! by Raymond Castans, directed by Jacques Charon
  - Quelqu'un derrière la porte by Jacques Robert, directed by André Villiers
  - Le noir te va si bien by Jean Marsan after Saul O'Hara, directed by Jean Le Poulain
  - Le Nu au tambour by Noël Coward, adaptation Albert Husson, directed by Jacques-Henri Duval and Jean Degrave
  - Les Hannetons by Eugène Brieux, directed by René Clermont
  - Un homme d'action by William Dinner and William Morum, adaptation Pol Quentin, directed by Grégoire Aslan
  - Il était une gare by Jacques Deval, directed by Jacques Mauclair
  - Le Sourire de la Joconde by Aldous Huxley, adaptation Georges Neveux, directed by Raymond Gérôme
  - The Mandrake by Roland Jouve after Machiavelli, directed by Jacques Ardouin
  - Inspecteur Grey by André Faltianni and Alfred Gragnon, directed by Robert Manuel
  - Mon cœur balance by Michel Duran, directed by Claude Nicot
  - Monsieur Silence by Jean Guitton, directed by Christian Alers
  - Les Derniers Outrages by Robert Beauvais, directed by Michel Roux
  - Lady Godiva by Jean Canolle, directed by Michel de Ré
  - On croit rêver by Jacques François, directed by the author
  - Le Moulin de la galette by Marcel Achard, directed by Max Fournel
  - La Rabouilleuse by Émile Fabre after Honoré de Balzac, directed by Robert Manuel
- 1976:
  - Le Pirate by Raymond Castans, directed by Jacques Sereys
  - Sacrés Fantômes by Eduardo De Filippo, directed by Jean Michaud
  - Seul le poisson rouge est au courant by Jean Barbier and Dominique Nohain, directed by Dominique Nohain
  - La Sainte Famille by André Roussin, directed by Georges Vitaly
  - Am-Stram-Gram by André Roussin, directed by Claude Nicot
  - La Bagatelle by Marcel Achard, directed by Jean Meyer
  - Fanny et ses gens by Jerome K. Jerome, adaptation André Méry and Pierre Scize, directed by Raymond Gérôme
  - Le Guilledou by Michael Clayton Hutton, adaptation Constance Coline, directed by Robert Manuel
  - Week-end by Noël Coward, adaptation André Méry and Antoine Bibesco, directed by Jacques Ardouin
  - Le monsieur qui attend by Emlyn Williams, adaptation André Roussin, directed by Georges Vitaly
  - La Charrette anglaise by Georges Berr and Louis Verneuil, directed by Jean-Laurent Cochet
  - Xavier ou l'héritier des Lancestre by Jacques Deval, directed by Robert Manuel
  - Le Cœur sous le paillasson by Harold Brooke and Kay Bannerman, adaptation Alexandre Breffort, directed by Michel Vocoret
  - La Femme de paille by Catherine Arley, directed by Raymond Gérôme
  - L'Héritière by Ruth Goetz and Augustus Goetz, adaptation Louis Ducreux, directed by René Clermont
  - Un mois à la campagne by Ivan Turgenev, adaptation Albert Husson, directed by Jean Meyer
  - La Frousse by Julien Vartet, directed by René Clermont
  - Le Coin tranquille by Michel André, directed by Michel Vocoret
  - Une femme presque fidèle by Jacques Bernard, directed by Jacques Mauclair
  - Le monsieur qui a perdu ses clés by Michel Perrin, directed by Robert Manuel
  - Attends-moi pour commencer by Joyce Rayburn, adaptation Jean Marsan, directed by Michel Roux

== 1976: Simone Valère and Jean Desailly ==
- 1976: Dis-moi, Blaise after Blaise Cendrars, directed by Michel Bertay
- 1976: Amphitryon 38 by Jean Giraudoux, directed by Jean-Laurent Cochet
- 1977: An Enemy of the People by Henrik Ibsen, directed by Étienne Bierry

== 1978: Pierre Bergé ==
Under the direction of Pierre Bergé the repertory expands with the creation of Nous ne connaissons pas la même personne by François-Marie Banier and Navire Night by Marguerite Duras. Robert Hirsch is invited in 1979 after a long career at the Comédie-Française and successfully plays in Deburau.

- 1978: Nous ne connaissons pas la même personne by François-Marie Banier, directed by Pierre Boutron
- 1979: Navire Night by Marguerite Duras, directed by Claude Régy
- 1979: Le Mort by Georges Bataille, directed by Claude Régy
- 1979: Le Piège by Ira Levin, directed by Riggs O'Hara
- 1979: Chat en poche by Georges Feydeau, directed by Jean-Laurent Cochet, with Thierry Le Luron
- 1980: Deburau by Sacha Guitry, directed by Jacques Rosny

== 1981: Jacqueline Cormier ==
First apparition of Philippe Caubère on a Parisian stage in January 1982 in his Danse du Diable. That same year Edwige Feuillère chose the Théâtre Édouard VII to return on the stage in La Dernière Nuit de l'été.

Jean Poiret and Maria Pacôme play Joyeuses Pâques. In 1983, Strindberg has his only and great popular success in Paris with Miss Julie played by Niels Arestrup and Fanny Ardant after Isabelle Adjani.

The year before that of his anniversary, Sacha Guitry returns home, thanks to Jean-Claude Brialy and Marie-José Nat, playing as a couple in Désiré.

With Chapitre II de Noël Simon, adapted by Pierre Barillet and Jean-Pierre Gredy and directed by Pierre Mondy, both Mireille Darc and Jean Piat returns on stage. La Répétition ou l'Amour puni by Jean Anouilh is played by Pierre Arditi, Emmanuelle Béart, Anny Duperey, Bernard Giraudeau and Béatrice Agenin, directed by Bernard Murat.

Paris discovers the English adaptation of the French classic Dangerous Liaisons with Bernard Giraudeau and Caroline Cellier. The season ends in May 1989 with Un mois à la campagne, dramatic comedy by Turgenev, with Isabelle Huppert, in a mise-en-scène by Bernard Murat.

- 1982: La Danse du diable by Philippe Caubère
- 1982: La Dernière Nuit de l'été d'Alexei Arbuzov, directed by Yves Bureau
- 1983: Miss Julie by August Strindberg, adaptation Boris Vian, directed by Andréas Voutsinas
- 1983: Joyeuses Pâques by Jean Poiret, directed by Pierre Mondy
- 1984: Désiré by Sacha Guitry, directed by Jean-Claude Brialy
- 1984: Treize à table by Marc-Gilbert Sauvajon, directed by René Clermont
- 1985: Chapitre II by Neil Simon, adaptation Pierre Barillet and Jean-Pierre Gredy, directed by Pierre Mondy
- 1986: La Répétition ou l'Amour puni by Jean Anouilh, directed by Bernard Murat
- 1986: Les Clients by Jean Poiret, directed by Bernard Murat
- 1987: Époque épique by Bernard Haller and Jean-Claude Carrière, with Bernard Haller
- 1988: Les Liaisons dangereuses by Christopher Hampton after Choderlos de Laclos, directed by Gérard Vergez
- 1988: Glengarry Glen Ross by David Mamet, directed by Marcel Maréchal

== 1989: Julien Vartet ==
The season starts in October 1989 with a new director, Julien Vartet and many comédies en vaudevilles which he authored: Point de feu sans fumée, Décibel, La Frousse, Archibald. These comedies alternate with an eclectic program: revival of Maxibules, a forgotten play by Marcel Aymé.

At the end of October 1994, the season starts with two plays by Georges Feydeau, On purge Bébé and Feu la Mère de Madame with Muriel Robin, Pierre Richard and Darry Cowl, in a mise-en-scene by Bernard Murat.

Julien Vartet undertakes important works of renovation which lead to the air conditioning of the venue.

- 1989: Un mois à la campagne by Ivan Turgenev, directed by Bernard Murat
- 1989: Point de feu sans fumée by Julien Vartet, directed by Jean-Paul Tribout
- 1990: Les Maxibules by Marcel Aymé, directed by Gérard Savoisien
- 1990: Le Plaisir de rompre and Le Pain de ménage by Jules Renard are interpreted by Anny Duperey, Bernard Giraudeau and Bernard Murat in a mise-en-scène by the latter
- 1991: Décibel by Julien Vartet, directed by Gérard Savoisien
- 1991: Jeanne et les juges by Thierry Maulnier, directed by Marcelle Tassencourt
- 1991: Même heure l'année prochaine by Bernard Slade, directed by Roger Vadim
- 1992: Les Enfants d'Édouard by Marc-Gilbert Sauvajon, directed by Jean-Luc Moreau
- 1993: La Frousse by Julien Vartet, directed by Raymond Acquaviva
- 1993: Toâ by Sacha Guitry, directed by Stéphane Hillel
- 1993: Durant avec un T by Julien Vartet, directed by Daniel Colas
- 1994: La Nuit à Barbizon by Julien Vartet, directed by Gérard Savoisien
- 1994: On purge bébé by Feu la mère de Madame by Georges Feydeau, directed by Bernard Murat
- 1994: Décibel by Julien Vartet, directed by Gérard Savoisien
- 1995: Archibald by Julien Vartet, directed by Daniel Colas
- 1998: Les Cinémas de la rue d'Antibes by Julien Vartet, directed by the author
- 1999: Archibald by Julien Vartet, directed by Jacqueline Bœuf

== 2001: Bernard Murat and Jean-Louis Livi ==
After it was closed one year, the theatre reopened in September 2001 under the codirection by Bernard Murat and Jean-Louis Livi.

- 2001: La Jalousie by Sacha Guitry, directed by Bernard Murat, with Michel Piccoli, Anne Brochet, Stéphane Freiss and Annick Alane
- 2002: Sarah by John Murrell, adapted by Éric-Emmanuel Schmitt, directed by Bernard Murat, with Robert Hirsch and Fanny Ardant then Anny Duperey
- 2003: Petits crimes conjugaux by Éric-Emmanuel Schmitt, directed by Bernard Murat, with Bernard Giraudeau and for the first time on stage, Charlotte Rampling
- 2003: L'Invité, first play by David Pharao, directed by Jean-Luc Moreau, Patrick Chesnais, Évelyne Buyle, and Philippe Khorsand
- 2004: Lunes de miel, comedy by Noël Coward, adaptation Éric-Emmanuel Schmitt, directed by Bernard Murat will be played some 250 times by the couple Pierre Arditi and Evelyne Bouix
- 2005: Amitiés sincères by François Prévôt-Leygonie and Stéphan Archinard, directed by Bernard Murat, with Bernard Murat and Michel Leeb
- 2005: Mémoires d'un tricheur by Sacha Guitry, adapted, directed and played by Francis Huster
- 2006: Deux sur la balançoire by William Gibson, adaptation Jean-Loup Dabadie, directed by Bernard Murat, with Alexandra Lamy and Jean Dujardin
- 2006: Le Vieux Juif blond, first play by Amanda Sthers, originally interpreted par Mélanie Thierry and directed by Jacques Weber, then by Fanny Valette under the direction of Bernard Murat
- 2006: Les Grandes Occasions by Bernard Slade, directed by Bernard Murat, with Clémentine Célarié dans Jean Reno
- 2007: L'Idée fixe by Paul Valéry, interpreted for the second time, some 20 years later, by Pierre Arditi and Bernard Murat, directed by Bernard Murat

== 2007: Bernard Murat ==
In September 2007, the théâtre Édouard VII celebrates the year of Sacha Guitry (1885–1957) with two shows:

- 2007: Mon père avait raison by Sacha Guitry, directed by Bernard Murat, with Claude and Alexandre Brasseur playing together for the first time, like Lucien and Sacha Guitry before them.
- 2007: Un type dans le genre de Napoléon, four unpublished one act plays by Sacha Guitry, directed by Bernard Murat, with Martin Lamotte, Florence Pernel, and Chloé Lambert

The following plays were all directed by Bernard Murat:

- 2008: Tailleur pour dames by Georges Feydeau
- 2008: Faisons un rêve by Sacha Guitry
- 2009: L'Éloignement by Loleh Bellon
- 2009: Sentiments provisoires by Gérald Aubert
- 2010: Audition by Jean-Claude Carrière
- 2010: Le Prénom by Matthieu Delaporte and Alexandre de la Patellière
- 2011: Le Paradis sur terre by Tennessee Williams
- 2011: Quadrille by Sacha Guitry
- 2012: Le Dindon by Georges Feydeau
- 2012: Comme s'il en pleuvait by Sébastien Thiéry
- 2014: La Porte à côté by Fabrice Roger-Lacan with Emmanuelle Devos and Édouard Baer
- 2015: Le Mensonge by Florian Zeller with Pierre Arditi, Évelyne Bouix, Josiane Stoléru and Jean-Michel Dupuis
