= We're No Angels (1989 film) =

1989 film by Neil Jordan

- Theatrical release poster
- Directed by: Neil Jordan
- Written by: David Mamet
- Based on: We're No Angels by Ranald MacDougall; La Cuisine Des Anges by Albert Husson; My Three Angels by Sam and Bella Spewack
- Produced by: Art Linson
- Starring: Robert De Niro; Sean Penn; Hoyt Axton; Bruno Kirby; Ray McAnally; James Russo; Demi Moore
- Cinematography: Philippe Rousselot
- Edited by: Mick Audsley
- Music by: George Fenton
- Production company: Paramount Pictures
- Distributed by: Paramount Pictures
- Release date: December 15, 1989
- Running time: 106 minutes
- Country: United States
- Language: English
- Budget: $20 million (estimated)
- Box office: $10.5 million

We're No Angels is a 1989 American comedy film directed by Neil Jordan. A remake of the 1955 film We're No Angels, it stars Robert De Niro, Sean Penn and Demi Moore. It received mixed reviews and grossed $10.5 million on a $20 million budget.

== Plot ==
In 1935, Great Depression-era convicts Ned and Jim, jailed on unspecified charges and abused by a ruthless warden, become escaped convicts when a vicious killer named Bobby escapes the electric chair.

The two escape to a small upstate New York town near the Canada–US border, where they are mistaken for a pair of priests who are expected at the local monastery. They want to flee but cannot because misunderstandings and the warden's search party for Bobby make a trip across the bridge to Canada almost impossible.

Ned and Jim continue to masquerade as priests, trusted and welcomed by Father Levesque. An opportunity presents itself in the form a procession to the church's sister church across the border. Each participating priest must bring someone who needs help, so they decide on the deaf and mute daughter of Molly, a local laundress and prostitute.

Bobby is killed by police during the procession. Ned saves Molly's daughter from drowning, after which she is able to speak. Jim is befriended by a young monk and decides to stay in the monastery to become an actual priest. Ned heads to Canada with Molly and her daughter.

== Cast ==
- Robert De Niro as Ned
- Sean Penn as Jim
- Demi Moore as Molly
- Hoyt Axton as Father Levesque
- Bruno Kirby as Deputy
- Ray McAnally as Warden
- James Russo as Bobby
- Wallace Shawn as Translator
- John C. Reilly as Young Monk

== Production ==
The project seemed like it could not fail: per A.J. Black, Robert De Niro and Sean Penn were "a bankable duo who Paramount would have been unconcerned about throwing a significant budget toward, produced by an impresario with proven hits at his back, written by a celebrated wordsmith and helmed by an acclaimed young director breaking into the studio system."

Screenwriter David Mamet took the initial premise from the 1955 movie of the same name, but he created a new scenario. Though the story is set in upstate New York, it was filmed in Mission, British Columbia. The set design involved the creation of an entire riverside town, with a budget of CDN $2.5 million for the set alone being the largest for a film produced in Canada to that date.

== Reception ==
The film garnered mixed reviews. Rotten Tomatoes sampled 21 reviewers, and judged 48% of the reviews to be positive, with an average score of 5.2/10. Audiences surveyed by CinemaScore gave the film a B− grade on scale of A to F.

Roger Ebert of the Chicago Sun-Times liked the film, saying, "Robert De Niro and Sean Penn have two of the best faces in the movies – screwed up, sideways faces with a lot of mischief in the eyes. We're No Angels is a movie made for those faces, and one of the pleasures of watching the film is to see them looking sidelong at each other as they try to figure a way out of the complicated mess they're in."

In a retrospective review from 2019, critic John Hansen wrote, "We're No Angels was probably hurt by being unappealing on the surface to both religious and non-religious moviegoers, with both groups assuming the film isn't for them. But it's actually for anyone who enjoys a smartly crafted comedy."

=== Box office ===
The film debuted at #8 at the United States box office. It had similar success on home video.

== See also ==
- Romans (2013), an Indian Malayalam language comedy thriller, directed by Boban Samuel.
- The Lizard (2004), an Iranian comedy drama film directed by Kamal Tabrizi.
