= Marie-France Mignal =

French actress

Marie-France Mignal (born 3 April 1940), is a French actress.

She is the co-director of the Théâtre Saint-Georges, with France Delahalle.

She is known for her work in television, cinema (Weekend at Dunkirk, The Two Orphans), and in adverts.

== Theatre ==
- 1960 : Le Signe de kikota by Roger Ferdinand, director Fernand Gravey, Théâtre des Nouveautés
- 1961 : La Saint-Honoré by Robert Nahmias, director Guy Lauzin, Théâtre des Nouveautés
- 1973 : La Débauche by Marcel Achard, director Jean Le Poulain, Théâtre de l'Œuvre
- 1980 : Potiche by Pierre Barillet and Jean-Pierre Gredy, director Pierre Mondy, Théâtre Antoine
- 1990 : Et moi et moi ! by Maria Pacôme, director Jean-Luc Moreau, Théâtre Saint-Georges
- 1993 : Les Désarrois de Gilda Rumeur by Maria Pacôme, director Jean-Luc Moreau, Théâtre Saint-Georges
- 1998 : Château en Suède by Françoise Sagan, directed Annick Blancheteau, Théâtre Saint-Georges
- 2000 : Si je peux me permettre by Robert Lamoureux, director Francis Joffo, Théâtre Saint-Georges
- 2002 : Le Charlatan by Robert Lamoureux, director Francis Joffo, Théâtre Saint-Georges

== Selected filmography ==
- The Bread Peddler (1963)
- Far from Vietnam (1967)
- Children of the Century (1999)
- Joséphine, ange gardien TV Series (1 Episode : "En roue libre") (2013)
