= Jean-Pierre Castaldi =

French actor (born 1944)

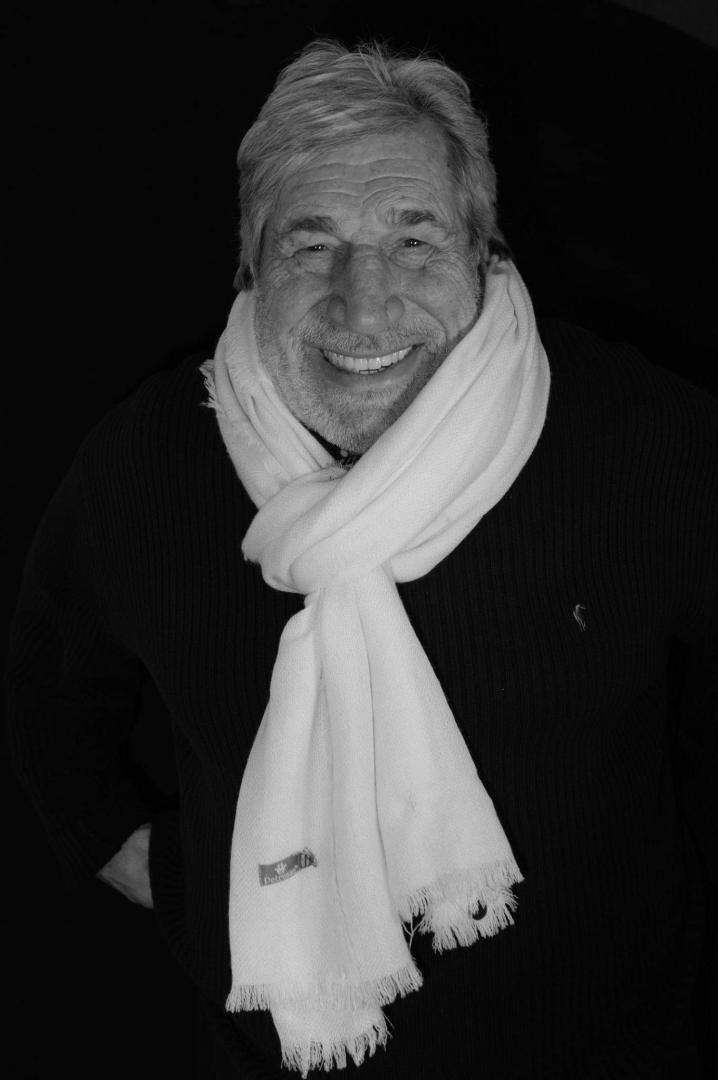
- Castaldi in 2019
- Born: Jean-Pierre Castaldi; 1 October 1944 (age 81); Grenoble, France
- Occupation: Actor
- Years active: 1964–present
- Spouse(s): Catherine Allégret (m. 1969; div. 1977) Corinne Champeval (m. 1999)
- Children: 3, including Benjamin

Jean-Pierre Castaldi ([ʒɑ̃pjɛʁ kastaldi]; born 1 October 1944) is a French stage, television and film actor. He is the father of French TV presenter and radio host Benjamin Castaldi.

== Theatre ==
Year	Title	Author	Director
1965	Berenice	Jean Racine	Jacques Sereys
1965	The Barber of Seville	Pierre Beaumarchais	Edmond Tamiz
1966	La Fin du monde	Sacha Guitry	Jean-Pierre Delage
1968	Le Cerceau	Sophie Darbon	Georges Descrières
1969	Blood Wedding	Federico García Lorca	Raymond Rouleau
1970	Le Soir du conquérant	Thierry Maulnier	Pierre Franck
1971	Des frites des frites	Arnold Wesker	Gérard Vergez
1973	Le Soir du conquérant	Thierry Maulnier	Pierre Franck
1976	Pour 100 briques t'as plus rien...	Didier Kaminka	Didier Kaminka
1979	Perversité sexuelle à Chicago	David Mamet	
1982	Toute honte bue	Jean-Pierre Bisson	Jean-Pierre Bisson
1983	Spartacus	Jacques Weber	Jacques Weber
1985	The Millionairess	George Bernard Shaw	J Rougerie
1987–1988	The Count of Monte Cristo	Alexandre Dumas	Jacques Weber (2)
1991	Rumors	Neil Simon (adaptation by Jean Poiret)	Pierre Mondy
1994	Les Enfants chœur	Louis-Michel Colas	Franck de La Personne
1995	L'Hôtel du libre échange	Georges Feydeau	Franck de La Personne (2)
1997	A Night to Remember	Walter Lord	Michel Pascal
1997	Vacances de rêve	Francis Joffo	Francis Joffo
1998–1999	Face à face	Francis Joffo	Francis Joffo (2)
2001	Ma femme est sortie	Jean Barbier	Jean-Pierre Dravel & Olivier Macé
2006	Clémentine	Jean Barbier	Jean-Pierre Dravel & Olivier Macé (2)
2008	La Perruche et le Poulet	Robert Thomas	Luq Hamett
2009	L'Amour foot	Robert Lamoureux	Francis Joffo (3)
2011	L'emmerdeur	Francis Veber	Didier Caron
2011	Tu m'as sauvé la vie	Sacha Guitry	Jean-Laurent Cochet
2013	Ah...vos souhaits	Éric Le Roch	Éric Le Roch
2014–2015	Le Charlatan	Robert Lamoureux	Jean Martinez

== Filmography ==
=== Cinema ===
Year	Title	Role	Director	Notes
1964	Angélique, Marquise des Anges	A courtier	Bernard Borderie	
1968	La Chamade	Man at Orly Airport	Alain Cavalier	Uncredited
1968	Ho!	Bénédicte's friend	Robert Enrico	
1969	The Christmas Tree	The cop	Terence Young	
1971	The Widow Couderc		Pierre Granier-Deferre	
1972	Le seize à Kerbriant	Lionel	Michel Wyn	TV series
1973	The Dominici Affair	The first journalist	Claude Bernard-Aubert	
1973	Ras le bol	Ondé	Michel Huisman	
1973	Décembre		Mohammed Lakhdar-Hamina	
1973	Graine d'ortie	The butcher	Yves Allégret	TV series
1973	R.A.S.	Sergeant Carbone	Yves Boisset	
1973	The Train	The sergeant	Pierre Granier-Deferre (2)	
1974	Creezy	Collard	Pierre Granier-Deferre (3)	
1974	Les Faucheurs de marguerites	Charles Voisin	Marcel Camus	TV mini-series
1974	Un matin de juin 40	Louis	Claude-Jean Bonnardot	TV movie
1974	Caravan to Vaccarès	Pierre	Geoffrey Reeve	
1974	La merveilleuse visite	François Mercadier	Marcel Carné	
1975	French Connection II	Raoul Diron	John Frankenheimer	
1975	Les enquêtes du commissaire Maigret	Marcel	Claude Boissol	TV series (1 episode)
1977	Les anneaux de Bicêtre	Gaston Gobet	Louis Grospierre	TV movie
1977	Pardon Mon Affaire, Too!	The bully	Yves Robert	
1978	Madame le juge	Peroni	Édouard Molinaro	TV series (1 episode)
1978	Les hommes de Rose	Julien	Maurice Cloche	TV series (1 episode)
1978	Médecins de nuit		Philippe Lefebvre	TV series (1 episode)
1979	Moonraker	Pilot Private Jet	Lewis Gilbert	
1979	Messieurs les jurés	René Coublanc	Dominique Giuliani	TV series (1 episode)
1979	Commissaire Moulin	José	Claude Boissol (2)	TV series (1 episode)
1979	Les enquêtes du commissaire Maigret	Manuel Bozzi	Yves Allégret (2)	TV series (2 episodes)
1980	Les amours de la belle époque	Eliburru	Dominique Giuliani (2)	TV series (1 episode)
1980	Une page d'amour	M. Rambaud	Élie Chouraqui	TV movie
1980	La traque	Lepage	Philippe Lefebvre (2)	TV movie
1980	La Boum	Brassac	Claude Pinoteau	
1981	Les Uns et les Autres		Claude Lelouch	
1981	Putain d'histoire d'amour	The cop	Gilles Béhat	
1981	Les amours des années grises	Raymond Landreau	Dominique Giuliani (3)	TV series (1 episode)
1981	Les enquêtes du commissaire Maigret	Greuter	Yves Allégret (3)	TV series (1 episode)
1982	Pour cent briques, t'as plus rien...	Henri	Édouard Molinaro (2)	
1983	Better Late Than Never	Doctor	Bryan Forbes	
1983	La veuve rouge	Me Aubray	Édouard Molinaro (3)	TV movie
1983	Le voleur de feuilles	Guy Desforges	Pierre Trabaud	
1984	The Twin	Charlie	Yves Robert (2)	
1984	La reverdie		Philippe Condroyer	TV series
1985	Palace	The cooker	Édouard Molinaro (4)	
1985	Les amours des années 50		Jean-Paul Carrère	TV series (1 episode)
1985	Monsieur de Pourceaugnac	The Swiss	Michel Mitrani	
1985	L'histoire en marche: Le serment	Barrabas	Roger Kahane	TV movie
1985–1986	Madame et ses flics	Simonelli	Roland-Bernard	TV series (12 episodes)
1986	Série noire	Chichin	Joël Séria	TV series (1 episode)
1986	Yiddish Connection		Paul Boujenah	
1986	Sarraounia	Sergeant Boutel	Med Hondo	
1987	La rumba	Mario Toselli	Roger Hanin	
1987	L'île		François Leterrier	TV mini-series
1987	Helsinki Napoli All Night Long	Igor	Mika Kaurismäki	
1988	Quelques jours avec moi	Max	Claude Sautet	
1988	La ruelle au clair de lune		Édouard Molinaro (5)	TV movie
1988	La maison dans la dune	Lourges	Michel Mees	
1989	Les cigognes n'en font qu'à leur tête	Doctor Cast	Didier Kaminka	
1989	Around the World in 80 Days	Lenoir	Buzz Kulik	TV mini-series
1989	Suivez cet avion	Taxi driver	Patrice Ambard	
1989	Les enquêtes du commissaire Maigret	Lecoin	Jean-Paul Sassy	TV series (1 episode)
1990	My New Partner II	Jean-Pierre Portal	Claude Zidi	
1990	Quartier nègre		Pierre Koralnik	TV movie
1990	Imogène		François Leterrier (2)	TV series (1 episode)
1990	Vincent & Theo	Father Tanguy	Robert Altman	
1990	Paparoff	Le Gall	Denys de La Patellière	TV series (2 episodes)
1990	Marie Pervenche	Commissioner Jouin	Claude Boissol (3)	TV series (2 episodes)
1990	Promotion canapé	Pierre	Didier Kaminka (2)	
1991	Appelez-moi Tonton	Monard	Dominique Baron	TV movie
1991	Money	Joachim	Steven Hilliard Stern	
1991	Cold Moon	Félix	Patrick Bouchitey	
1991	A Fine Romance	Marcel	Gene Saks	
1992	The Young Indiana Jones Chronicles	Rocco	René Manzor	TV series (1 episode)
1992	Rumeurs	Commissioner	André Flédérick	TV movie
1992	My Wife's Girlfriends	Plastic surgeon	Didier Van Cauwelaert	
1993	Nestor Burma	Castagna	Maurice Frydland	TV series (1 episode)
1993	Coup de jeune	Maurice Verret	Xavier Gélin	
1993	Antoine Rives, juge du terrorisme	Ravier	Philippe Lefebvre (3) & Gilles Béhat (2)	TV series (6 episodes)
1993	L'oeil écarlate	Vilard	Dominique Roulet	
1993	Le frère trahi	Viktor Brucan	Philippe Monnier	TV movie
1993	Profil bas	Smile	Claude Zidi (2)	
1993	Les ténors	Raoul	Francis De Gueltz	
1993	Aéroport		Eric Magnan	Short
1995	Les hommes et les femmes sont faits pour vivre heureux... mais pas ensemble	Charles	Philippe de Broca	TV movie
1996	Ma femme me quitte	Raymond	Didier Kaminka (3)	
1997	Arlette	Lulu	Claude Zidi (3)	
1999	Asterix & Obelix Take On Caesar	Caius Bonus	Claude Zidi (4)	
2000	Tapis vert		Thierry Bouteiller	Short
2001	Face à face	André Guasso	Jean-Philippe Viaud	TV movie
2001	The Musketeer	Planchet	Peter Hyams	
2002	Ma femme s'appelle Maurice	The concessionaire	Jean-Marie Poiré	
2002	Extreme Ops	Zoran	Christian Duguay	
2003	Quicksand	Jean Pillon	John Mackenzie	
2004	George and the Dragon	Father Bernard	Tom Reeve	
2004	Je m'indiffère	The father	Alain Rudaz & Sébastien Spitz	Short
2005	Travaux, on sait quand ça commence...	Frankie	Brigitte Roüan	
2006	Capitaine Casta: Amélie a disparu	Casta	Joyce Buñuel	TV movie
2006	Navarro	Gilbert Maillol	Philippe Davin	TV series (1 episode)
2008	Asterix at the Olympic Games	Castaldus	Frédéric Forestier & Thomas Langmann	
2010	Streamfield, les carnets noirs	President Massedelle	Jean-Luc Miesch	
2012	Un Marocain à Paris		Saïd Naciri	
2013	Hasta mañana	The blind	Sébastien Maggiani & Olivier Vidal	
2014	Le casse des casses	Georges	Florian Hessique	

=== Television ===
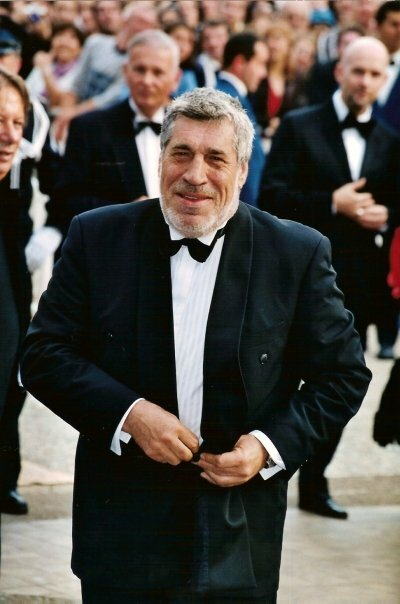
Castaldi at the 2002 Cannes Film Festival

- 2000–2002: host of Fort Boyard

=== Duanju ===
- 2013–2025: Knight Castaldi in King Gandolfi by Guillaume Sanjorge
