= My Three Angels (film) =

- Genre: comedy
- Based on: play My Three Angels by Samuel and Bella Spewack based on play by Albert Husson
- Written by: Noel Robinson
- Directed by: Alan Burke
- Country of origin: Australia
- Original language: English

Production
- Running time: 75 mins
- Production company: ABC

Original release
- Network: ABC
- Release: 19 December 1962 (Sydney)
- Release: 2 January 1963 (Melbourne)

My Three Angels is a 1962 Australian television adaptation which marked the acting debut of champion swimmer Murray Rose.

It was based on the play My Three Angels by Samuel and Bella Spewack which in turn was based on the French play La Cuisine Des Anges by Albert Husson.

== Plot ==
On Christmas Eve in French Guiana, Felix and Emillie Ducotel struggle to maintain a small shop and the arrival of Felix's unpleasant cousin, Henri. They have a daughter, Marie-Louise.

Three convicts, decide that, as a Christmas gift to the family, they will set everyone's problems to rights.

== Cast ==
- Gordon Chater as convict
- Murray Rose as convict
- Richard Davies as convict
- Laurie Lange as Felix
- Nancye Stewart as Emilie
- Owen Weingott as Henri
- Anna Volska as Marie-Louise
- Olive Walter
- Scott Tyler
- Bowen Llewellyn

== Production ==
The show marked the acting debut of swimmer Murray Rose. Rose had become interested in acting after appearing in a play at college in the US. When back in Australia, a friend told Alan Burke of Rose's interest, and Burke called the swimmer to offer him a role. "He read very well," said Burke. "I was very pleased with him. His looks are ideal for the part. He was the only one of the actors I considered who could get across the gallic charm I was looking for."

Rose said the emphasis was different from the film version.

It was also the TV debut of Anna Volska, who was then 18. It was the first Australian TV play from Gordon Chater.

Chater had met Volska in a production of The Cherry Orchard at the Old Tote and said with her "I met my match in the giggling stakes... We both tended to be uncontrollable and diagraced ourselves later in a TV studio where something sparked us off, enraging the director which made us both worse. Well, it's better to have been sacked than never to have laughed at all. We were reinstated." It is likely this production was My Three Angels.

== Reception ==
The Sydney Morning Herald called it "moderately successful" because it did not manage to treat the material "so whimsically and delicately that its rather dubious morality remains in the realm of fantasy." However he did think that "on its own rather obvious terms it [the production] was efficient enough." The critic added that Murray Rose was "amiable and decorative and obviously did everything the producer had told him to do; but it would be overcharitable to suggest that he did it with any conviction or distinction."

The Sun Herald said Rose's performance was "neat, workmanlike and competent" adding that Gordon Chater "was superb."

The Age called it "a mediocrity".

== See also ==
- List of television plays broadcast on Australian Broadcasting Corporation (1960s)
