= Place des Célestins =

Square in Lyon, France

Coordinates: 45.759791°N 4.831837°E

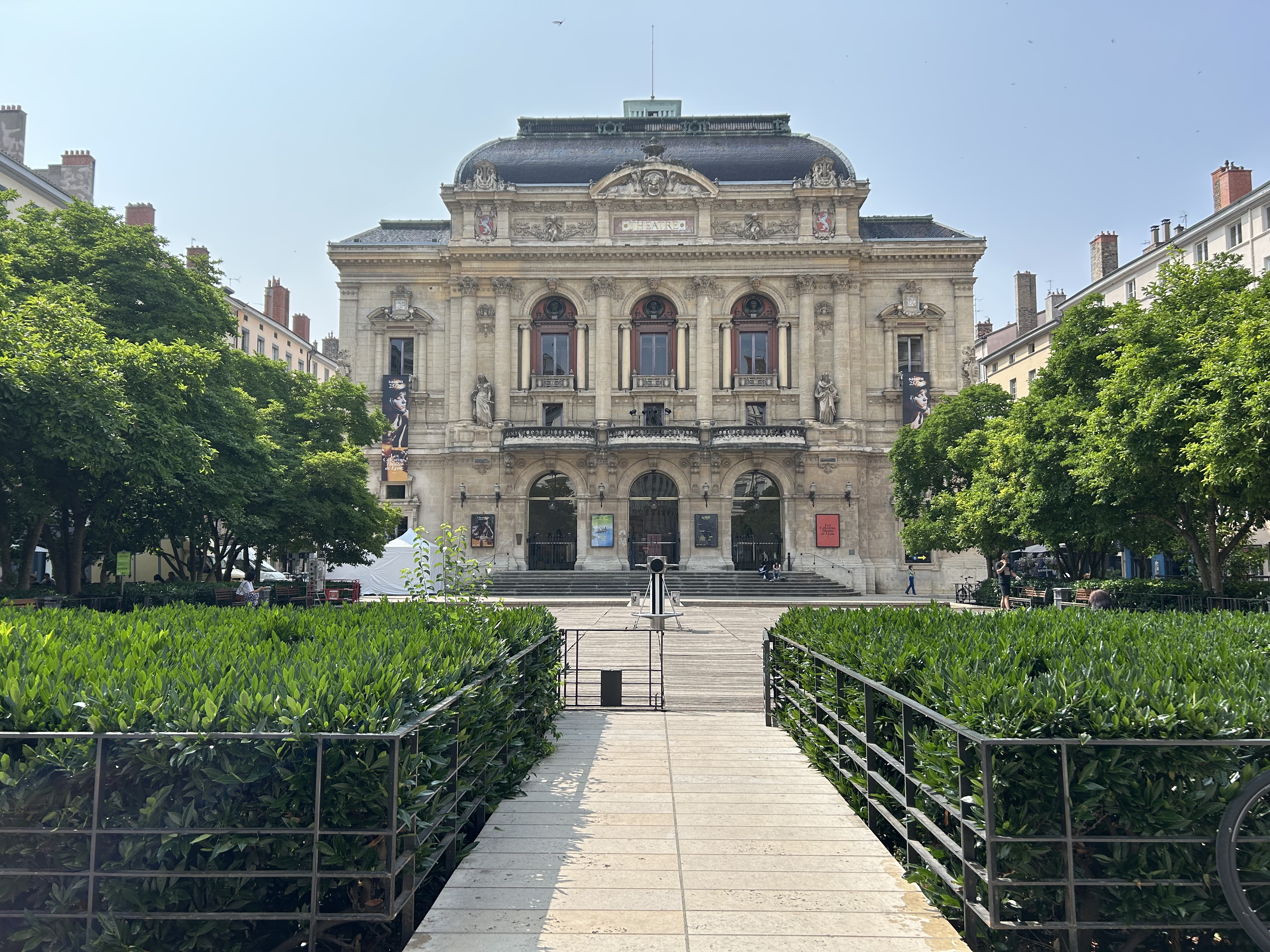
The Célestins’ square and theatre.

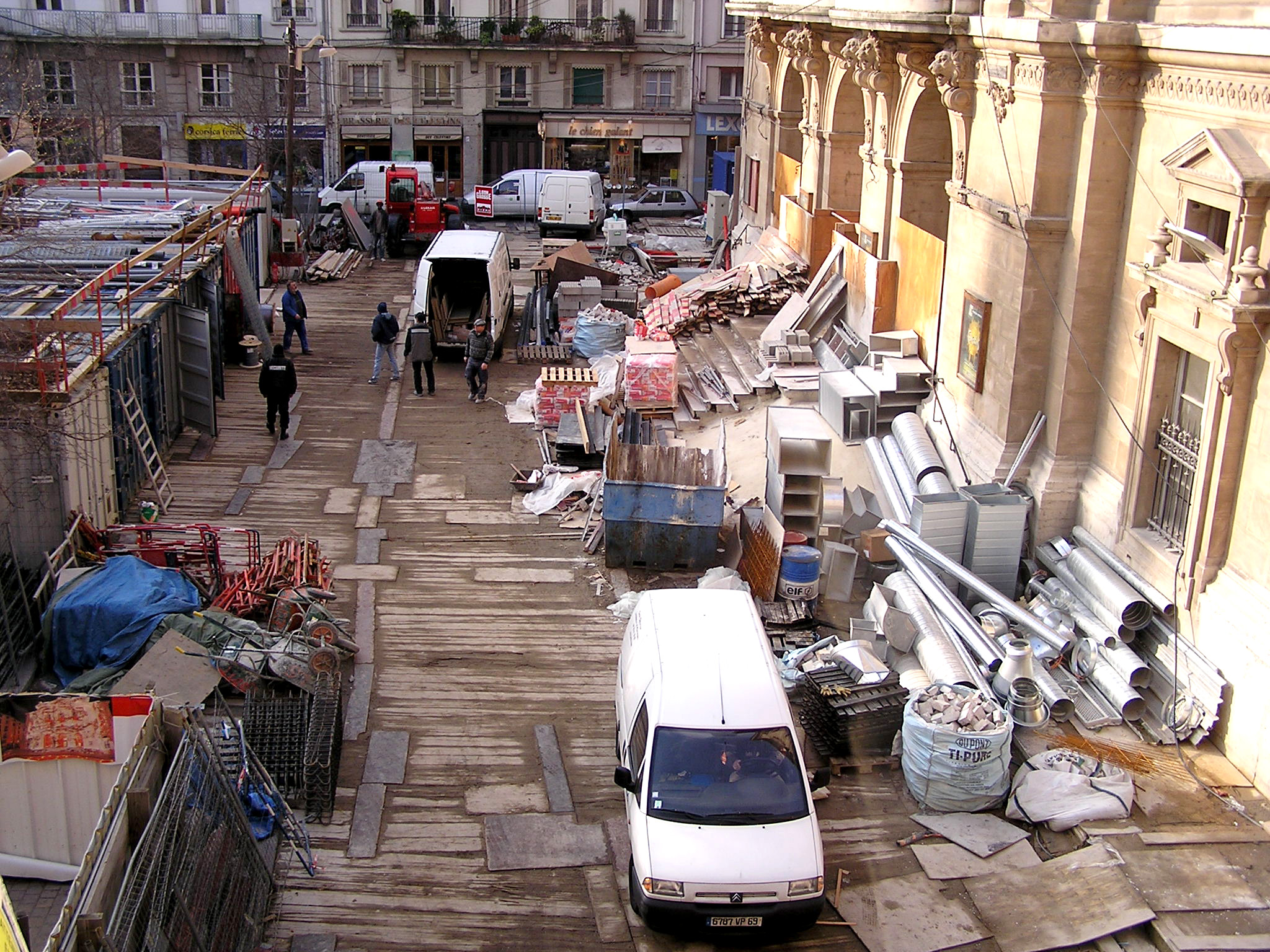
Part of the Place des Célestins during the renovation works of the theater in February 2005.

The Place des Célestins (French pronunciation: [plas de selɛstɛ̃]) is a square located in the Célestins quarter, in the 2nd arrondissement of Lyon. The square was named after the religious of the Order of the Celestines which were installed from 1407 to 1778. Redevelopment in 1995 added an underground car park. This zone is served by the metro station Bellecour. It belongs to the zone classified as World Heritage Site by UNESCO.

== History ==
Before 1307, the square was located on the lands owned by the Knights Templar, who had a command post there.

After the Knights Templar's eviction, the Celestines installed a monastery which, despite some fires, remained for almost 400 years. Eventually demolished in 1778, it was replaced with the housing estate of the Celestines and a theater. In the second half of the 19th century, the plan of major architectural creations through Presqu'île provided for a track linking the Rue Mercière and the Place Bellecour to the Place des Célestins. This project was finally cancelled. The square was redeveloped in 1994-1995, during which an underground parking lot was dug. Within the square, a kind of refracting telescope provides a kaleidoscope view of the car park below.

The square has had almost the same appearance since the eighteenth century. Its most notable monument is the Théâtre des Célestins, designed by Gaspard André, and inaugurated in 1877, then in 2005.

== See also ==
- List of streets and squares in Lyon
