= We're No Angels (1955 film) =

1955 film by Michael Curtiz

- Theatrical release poster
- Directed by: Michael Curtiz
- Screenplay by: Ranald MacDougall
- Based on: La Cuisine Des Anges by Albert Husson
- Produced by: Pat Duggan
- Starring: Humphrey Bogart; Aldo Ray; Peter Ustinov
- Cinematography: Loyal Griggs
- Edited by: Arthur P. Schmidt
- Music by: Frederick Hollander
- Distributed by: Paramount Pictures
- Release date: July 7, 1955
- Running time: 106 minutes
- Country: United States
- Languages: English; French
- Box office: $3 million (US/Canada rentals)

We're No Angels is a 1955 American Christmas comedy film directed by Michael Curtiz, starring Humphrey Bogart, Peter Ustinov, Aldo Ray, Joan Bennett, Basil Rathbone, Leo G. Carroll, and Gloria Talbott. Shot in both VistaVision and Technicolor, the film was a Paramount Pictures release.

The screenplay was written by Ranald MacDougall, based on the French play La Cuisine Des Anges by Albert Husson. Husson's play had been adapted into the successful Broadway play My Three Angels by Samuel and Bella Spewack, but the film purported to be based on the Husson original rather than the Spewacks' adaptation. The Spewacks sued Paramount four months after the film was released. As Howard Thompson wrote in the New York Times review of the Curtiz film, "Oddly enough, the new Paramount comedy, We're No Angels, gives sole credit to the Gallic original, then stalks the Spewacks almost scene by scene, without, alas, most of the fun."

Mary Grant designed the film's costumes.

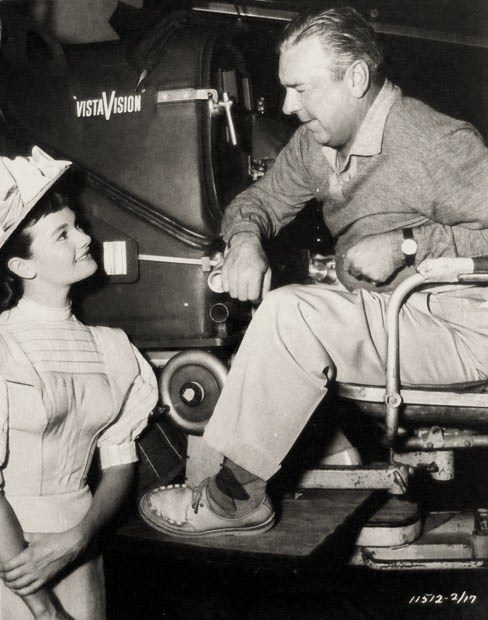
Gloria Talbott with cinematographer Loyal Griggs.

The film is set on Christmas Eve and Christmas Day, 1895.

== Plot ==
Three convicts – Joseph, Albert and Jules – escape from prison on Devil's Island in French Guiana just before Christmas and arrive at the nearby French colonial town of Cayenne on Christmas Eve. Joseph is a thief; the other two are murderers.

They go to a store managed by Felix Ducotel. The store is in a very poor financial position as it is the only one to give supplies on credit. While there, they notice its roof is leaking, and offer to fix it for nothing. They get involved in selling things in the shop and have a knack for it, selling a brush set to a bald man, and getting the first cash income in a long time. They offer to make Christmas dinner for the family and the meal is very successful.

They do not actually intend to, but decide to remain there until nightfall, when they will steal clothes and supplies and escape on a ship waiting in the harbor. As they wait, they find that the small family of Felix, Amelie, and daughter Isabelle, is in financial distress and offer their services to hide the trio's all-too-sinister ruse. Joseph even gets to work conning people and falsifying records to make the store prosperous. However, the three felons begin to have a change of heart after they fix a delicious Christmas dinner for the Ducotels made mostly of stolen items.

Tensions heighten after store owner Andre Trochard arrives from Paris with his nephew Paul, with a set of crocodile skin luggage. The Trochards plan on taking over the store, which they perceive is unprofitable due to its use of credit. Isabelle had planned to wed Paul but it turns out that Paul is betrothed to another woman, to Isabelle's dismay. Before any action can be taken, Andre gets bitten by Albert's pet viper, Adolphe, and dies. Adolphe disappears and the three have to search for him. Eventually Adolphe is found: Paul is fatally bitten by the snake which was hiding in Andre's pocket, which Paul was searching through.

Isabelle finds another love, and the family is happy as the convicts finally ready for their postponed escape. However, while waiting on the docks for their boat to arrive, the three reconsider. Judging that the outside world is likely to be worse than that of the prison, they decide to turn themselves back in. As they walk toward the boat at film's end, halos appear over their heads...followed by one over Adolphe's cage.

== Cast ==
- Humphrey Bogart as Joseph
- Aldo Ray as Albert
- Peter Ustinov as Jules
- Joan Bennett as Amelie Ducotel
- Basil Rathbone as Andre Trochard
- Leo G. Carroll as Felix Ducotel
- Gloria Talbott as Isabelle Ducotel
- John Baer as Paul Trochard
- Lea Penman as Madame Parole, customer
- John Smith as Medical Officer Arnaud
- Torben Meyer as Butterfly Man (uncredited)
- Paul Newlan as Port Captain (uncredited)

== Reception ==
The film gained mixed reviews. Howard Thompson, critic for the New York Times, was underwhelmed, calling it a "shrill, misguided picture" and writing that the filmic version was not on par with the Broadway version. Variety found few faults in the "breezy comedy" but claimed that among its faults was its inability to utilize a more cinematic blocking: "At times proceedings are too consciously cute and stage origin of material still clings since virtually all scenes are interiors with characters constantly entering and exiting."

The Philadelphia Inquirer critic, who had seen the 1953 stage production, was most critical of Humphrey Bogart's performance: "To say that Humphrey Bogart rattles around in the capacious comedy clothes of Walter Slezak, and that Michael Curtiz misses the outrageous humor of Jose Ferrer’s [stage] direction is putting it gently….Even slowed down to a walk, with Ranald MacDougall’s script no match for the breezy Sam and Bella Spewack adaptation…a certain amount of humor inevitably seeps through as three escaped Devil’s Island convicts play unorthordox guardian angels to the French shopkeeper’s family they originally came to rob. Once the trio comes down from M. Ducotel’s roof and gets to work booming business, plotting the demise of the shop’s nasty actual owner and doctoring the books, things improve noticeably. But there are still long stretches of arid conversation mixed with the genuinely funny moments. And there is still the uneasy spectacle of Bogart desperately trying to be cute as the sole member of the trio without blood on his hands….without a stalwart in this key role, the whole comedy totters. The secondary ‘angels’ are, however, much better, with Peter Ustinov stealing the show...and Aldo Ray doing nicely....Joan Bennett is far from ideal as Madame Ducotel, and Gloria Tabott woefully lacking in the appeal presumably possessed by the lovelorn daughter."

Jack Moffit of The Hollywood Reporter had a favorable review of the film, calling it "a glamorous comedy" full of performances which "are uniformly excellent" and a screenplay which "is worthy of study." Likewise, Lionel Collier of Picturegoer praised it as "a real breakaway comedy – ghoulish humor with a neat sardonic kick."

We're No Angels grossed $3 million in the box office. In 1955, it was the 34th highest-grossing film in the U.S./Canada market.

== Legacy ==
The opening sequence contains the song "Ma France Bien-Aimée" which borrows the music of "Plaisir d'amour". The familiar-sounding tune was also used as the melody in Elvis Presley's hit "Can't Help Falling in Love" (1961).

The song "Sentimental Moments" by Friedrich Hollander and Ralph Freed was recorded and released by Eric Clapton for his 2018 Christmas album, "Happy Xmas".

In 1989, Neil Jordan directed a remake of We're No Angels starring Robert De Niro, Sean Penn, and Demi Moore where the escaped convicts are mistaken for a pair of priests at a local monastery in upstate New York.

== See also ==
- List of American films of 1955
- List of Christmas films
