= Grand Temple de Lyon =

Church in the 3rd arrondissement of Lyon, France

- Grand temple de Lyon
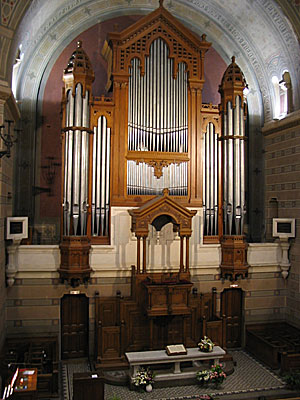
- Organ of the temple

Religion
- Affiliation: United Protestant Church of France
- District: 3rd arrondissement of Lyon
- Year consecrated: 1884

Location
- Location: Lyon, France
- Interactive map of Grand Temple de Lyon
- Coordinates: 45°45′43″N 4°50′29″E

Architecture
- Architect: Gaspard André
- Type: church
- Style: Byzantine
- Completed: 1884
- Capacity: 900

Website
- https://grandtemple.fr

The Grand Temple de Lyon is a Protestant church located at 3 Quai Victor Augagneur, in the 3rd arrondissement of Lyon. The parish is a member of the United Protestant Church of France.

== History ==
The church was built in 1884 by Protestant architect Gaspard André (1840–1896) and was inaugurated on 1 May 1884. The facade, made between 1879 and 1885, is decorated with many arcs patterns. The furniture of the church is of the nineteenth century.

It is owned by the Lyon congregation of the United Protestant Church of France. Religious services are held there every Sunday morning. It also held many concerts. It is a listed monument historique since 2011.

Besides the 900-seat hall of worship, the building also contains the popular Protestant library. This library was founded on 1 April 1830 at the Temple du Change and installed in 1889 in the Grand Temple. It stopped its purchases in 1926 before closing in 1930, because of a major competition from the municipal library system of neighborhoods of the Lyon city. This is a popular library of the nineteenth century, preserved in its original state. It contains about 4,500 books of history, philosophy, theology, travels and as many novels for children and adults, collections of popular songs and magazines.

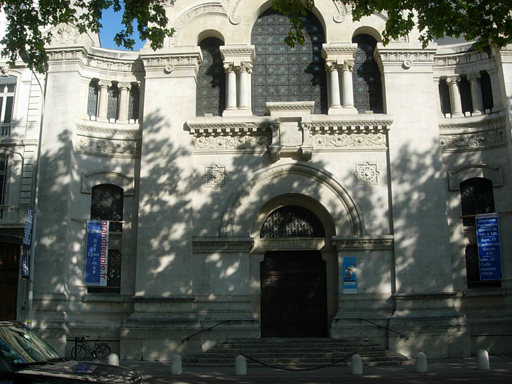
Facade of the Grand Temple

The pipe organ was built in 1884 by Merklin, rebuilt in 1923 after a fire. It is equipped with a "mechano-pneumatic" transmission. Some changes were made by the organ builder Dunand in the 60s. Restored by the organ builder Promonet, it was equipped with a second mobile console.

== Bibliography ==
- Collective book, Le grand Temple de Lyon et son orgue, 1998. Preface by Raymond Barre
- Carbonnier-Burkard, Marianne – La bibliothèque populaire de Lyon au XIXe siècle – Villeurbanne : ENSB, 1976.- Mémoire du diplôme supérieur des Bibliothèques – 210 p.; 30 cm. (Archives Église Réformée de Lyon et BML 6900 ZX2 CAR)
