= Théâtre des Célestins =

Theatre in Lyon, France

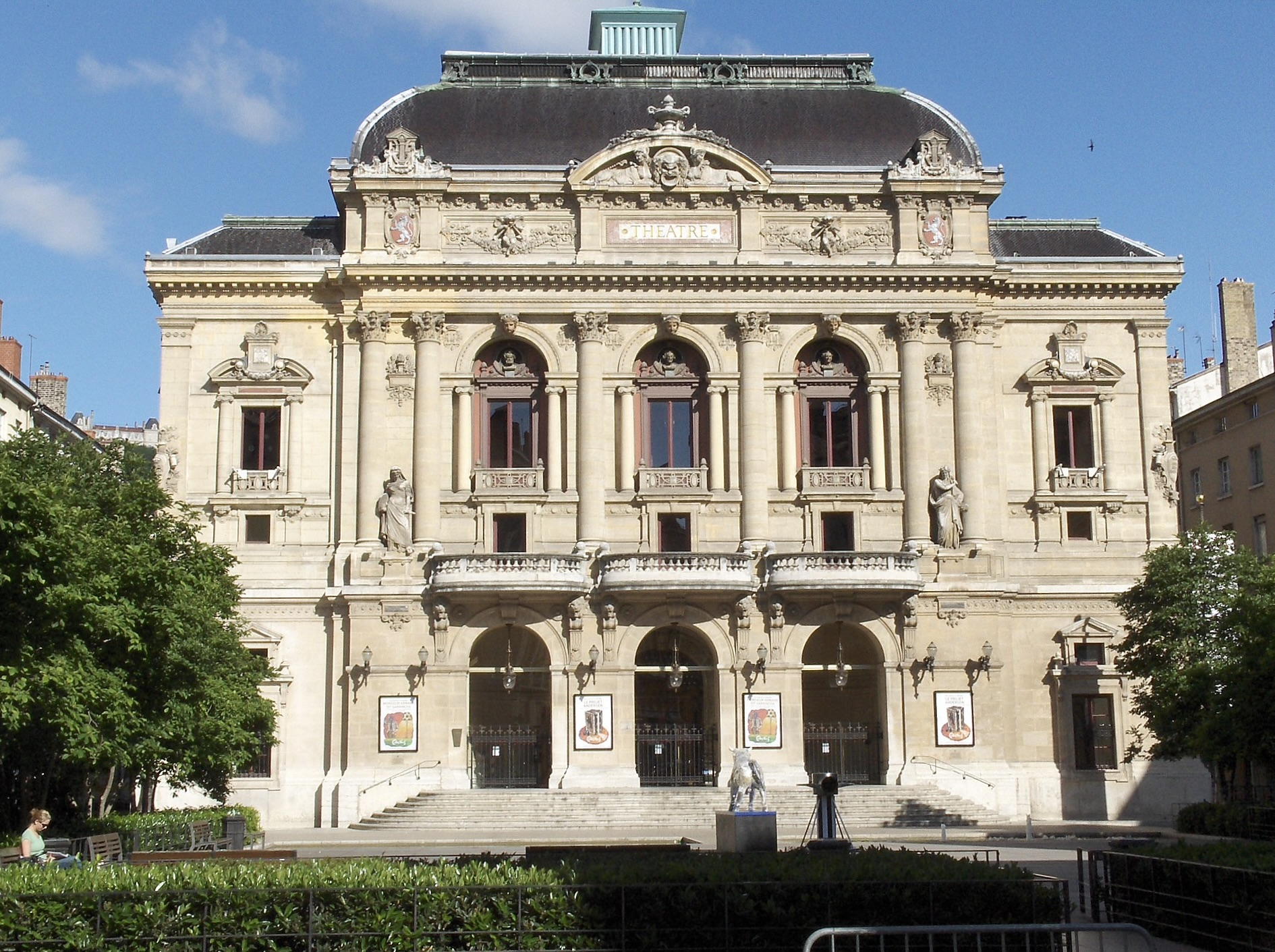
Théâtre des Célestins

The Théâtre des Célestins (French pronunciation: [teɑtʁ de selɛstɛ̃]) is a theatre building on the Place des Célestins in Lyon, France. It was designed by Gaspard André, and inaugurated in 1877, then again in 2005. Alongside the Comédie-Française and the Théâtre de l'Odéon, it is one of few theatres with over 200 years' continual usage in France. It is now a municipal theatre directly run by the City of Lyon. It has a contemporary and classical repertoire as well as producing new work.

== History ==
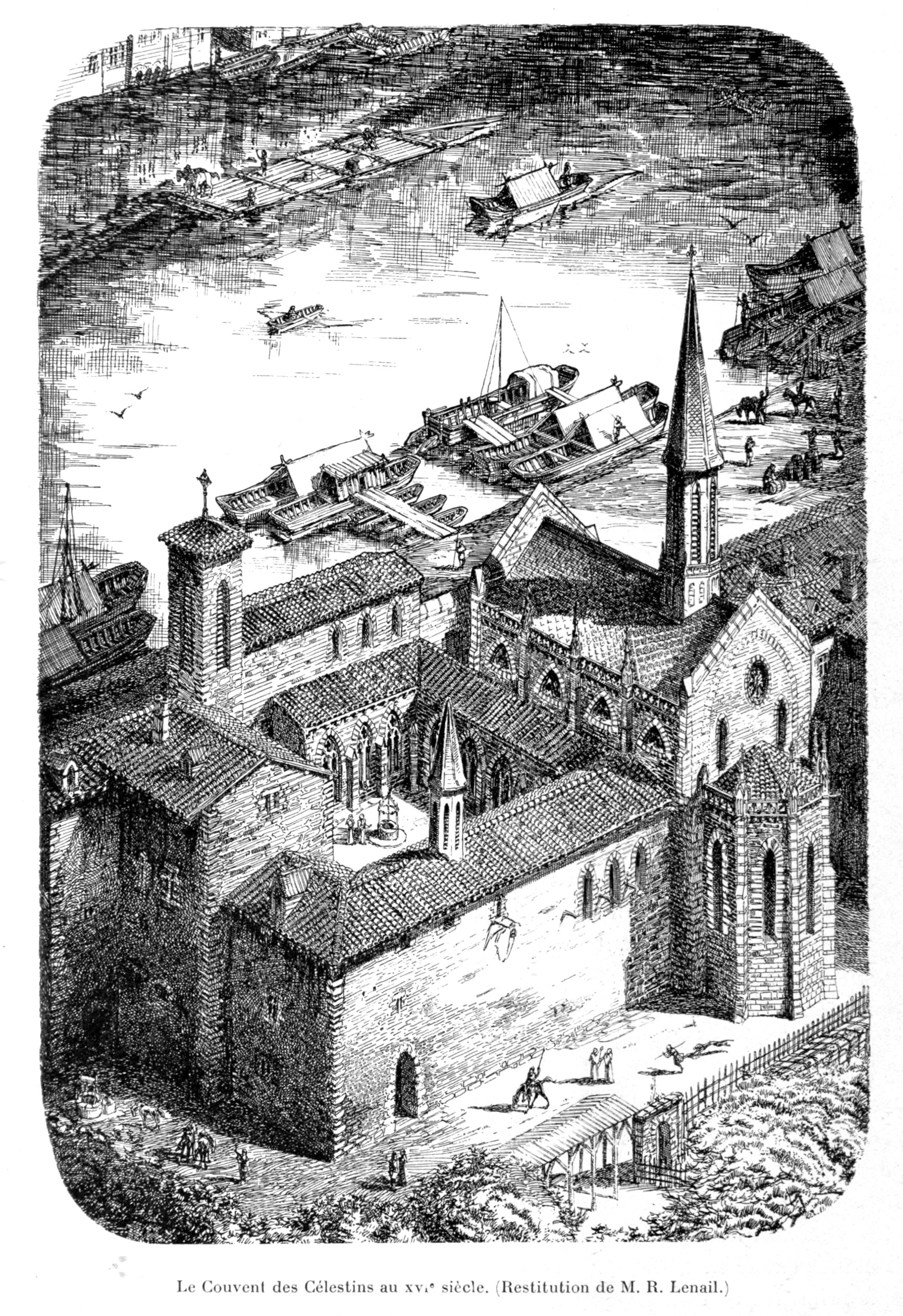
The Celestine convent, 19th century reconstruction.

The theatre and the square on which it stands are named after a convent and church of the Celestine order, which occupied the site between 1407 and 1789. It was founded on the banks of the Saône on land seized from the Templars by Amedee VIII of Savoy and given to the order.

The order used the land until 1779. A 'Société des Célestins' then a 'Compagnie des Célestins' were formed in 1789 for "the establishment of a garden at the centre of the former Celestine lands, the construction of 17 houses around the garden, the distribution and repair of the cloister building to form 7 private houses, in one of which shall be built a theatre". The first theatre building was inaugurated on 9 April 1792. Napoleon I attended a show at the theatre during the Consulte de Lyon in 1802.

The first building later became too small and fell into disrepair before being completely destroyed in a fire in 1871. A competition was held to design a new one, which was won by Gaspard André - it was inaugurated on 1 August 1877 but damaged by fire on the night of 25–26 May 1880, with André called in to repair it.

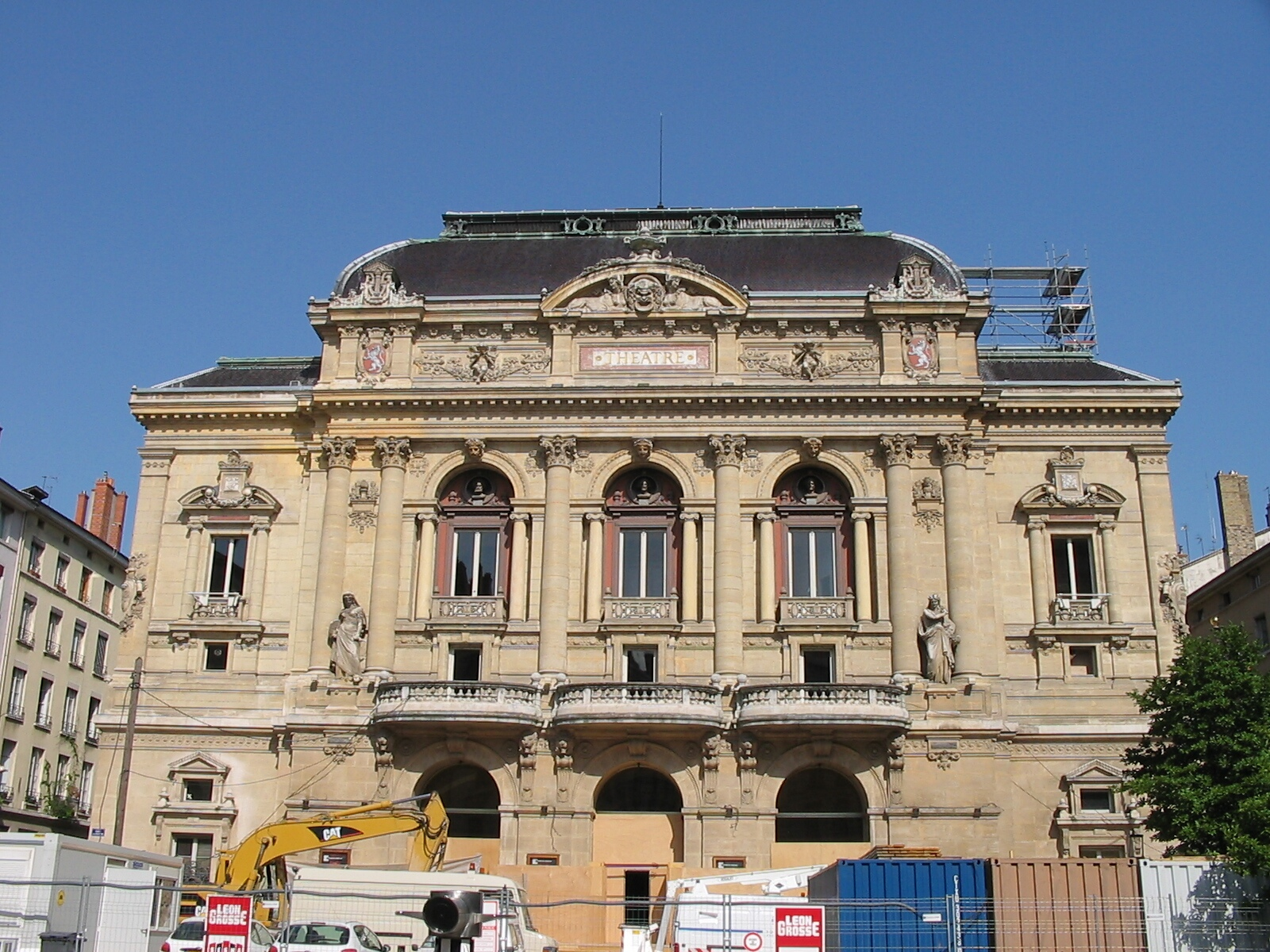
Building work at the théâtre des Célestins.

Several notable actors such as Sarah Bernhardt and Jean Marais have acted at the theatre. For 35 years Charles Moncharmont was its artistic director, during which time it hosted Cécile Sorel, Jules Berry, Ludmilla and Georges Pitoeff, Louis Jouvet, Charles Dullin, Elvire Popesco, Sacha Guitry, Madeleine Renaud, Pierre Dux, Jean Weber and Fernandel, as well as music-hall stars such as Joséphine Baker, Mistinguett and Maurice Chevalier. Charles Gantillon succeeded Moncharmont in 1941, inviting Jean Cocteau, Eugène Ionesco, Armand Gatti, Samuel Beckett and Bertolt Brecht. He also gave Jorge Lavelli, Patrice Chéreau, Edmond Tamiz and Marcel Maréchal their first chances. On 26 January 1968 Albert Husson and Jean Meyer were made joint artistic directors. On Huson's death in 1978, Meyer took over alone. He was succeeded in 1985 by Jean-Paul Lucet (who had acted alongside Meyer's favourite actress, Claude Jade, who had appeared in five plays at the theatre for him between 1975 and 1984).

Claudia Stavisky became sole artistic director in 2000, until she was joined by Patrick Penot in 2002 then Marc Lesage in 2014. A major rebuild occurred between 2002 and 2005, creating a second auditorium, the Célestine, with capacity for 130 people.
