= Michel Roux (actor) =

French actor

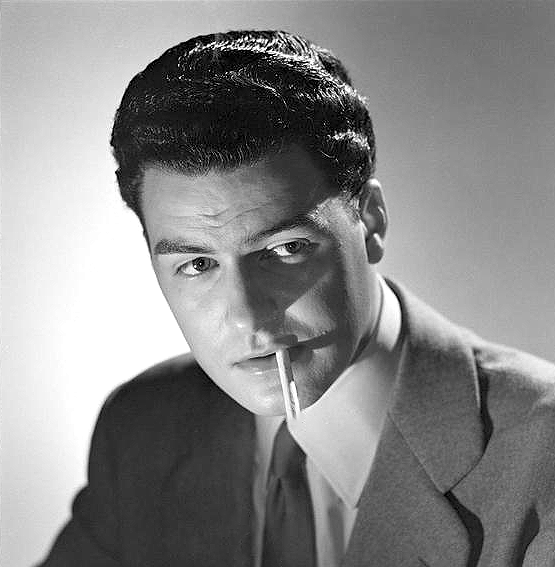
- Born: 2 February 1929; Colombes, France
- Died: 2 February 2007 (aged 77); Paris, France
- Occupation: Actor

Michel Roux (22 July 1929 in Colombes, Hauts-de-Seine - 2 February 2007 in Paris) was a French actor.

He was also the French voice for many American and Italian actors, such as Jack Lemmon, Peter Sellers, Alec Guinness and Tony Curtis.

The main part of this actor's work was in theatre.

Roux died of cardiac arrest at the age of 77 on February 2, 2007, in Paris.

== Filmography ==
- Michel Roux at IMDb

== Videography ==
- 1950 : Alec Guinness dans Noblesse oblige
- 1950 : Edgar Buchanan dans La porte du diable
- 1952 : Ben Gazzara dans Autopsie d'un meurtre
- 1954 : Adrian Hoven dans Les jeunes années d'une Reine
- 1954 : John Forsythe dans Fort Bravo
- 1954 : Keenan Wynn dans L'escadrille Panthère
- 1954 : Robert Francis dans Ouragan sur le Caine, The Caine Mutiny
- 1955 : Alec Guinness dans Le cygne
- 1955 : Cliff Robertson dans Picnic
- 1956 : Bing Crosby dans Haute Société
- 1956 : Claus Biederstaedt dans Feu d'artifice
- 1956 : Dan Dailey dans Viva Las Vegas
- 1957 : Alberto Sordi dans Le médecin et le sorcier
- 1957 : Jack Lemmon dans Cowboy
- 1957 : Jack Lemmon dans L'Enfer des tropiques
- 1957 : John van Dreelen dans Le temps d'aimer et le temps de mourir
- 1957 : Leopoldo Trieste dans L'adieu aux armes
- 1957 : Montgomery Clift dans Le bal des maudits
- 1957 : Peter Graves dans L'admirable Crichton
- 1957 : Wim Sonneveld dans La Belle de Moscou
- 1958 : Alec Guinness dans Le bouc-émissaire
- 1958 : Bradford Dillman dans Le génie du mal
- 1958 : Robert Buzz Henry dans La vallée de la poudre
- 1958 : Henry Silva dans Les bravados
- 1958 : Paul Hubschmid dans Le Tigre du Bengale
- 1958 : Peter Myers dans Qu'est ce que maman comprend à l'amour ?
- 1958 : Stuart Whitman dans Le Bruit et la fureur
- 1958 : Stuart Whitman dans Duel dans la boue
- 1958 : Tibério Murgia dans Le Pigeon
- 1959 : Cary Grant dans La Mort aux trousses
- 1959 : Maxwell Shaw dans Chérie, recommençons
- 1959 : Renato Salvatori dans Hold-up à la milanaise
- 1960 : Alan Young dans La machine à voyager dans le Temps
- 1960 : Alexander Scourby dans Les sept voleurs
- 1960 : Channing Pollock dans Il était trois flibustiers
- 1960 : Cornel Wilde dans Le secret du grand Canyon
- 1960 : Elvis Presley dans G.I. Blues
- 1960 : Elvis Presley dans Les rodeurs de la plaine
- 1960 : John Saxon dans Les cavaliers de l'Enfer
- 1960 : Lee Montague dans Scotland Yard contre X
- 1960 : Sammy Davis Jr. dans L'Inconnu de Las Vegas
- 1960 : Sanford Meisner dans Tendre est la nuit
- 1960 : Tony Randall dans Les aventuriers du fleuve
- 1960 : Tony Randall dans Le Milliardaire
- 1961 : Jim Hutton dans L'américaine et l'amour
- 1961 : John Saxon dans Mr. Hobbs prend des vacances
- 1962 : Bob Newhart dans L'Enfer est pour les héros
- 1962 : Jerry Van Dyke dans Il faut marier papa
- 1962 : Pierre Brice dans Le trésor du lac d'argent
- 1962 : Stuart Whitman dans Le jour le plus long
- 1962 : Tony Randall dans Garçonnière pour 4
- 1962 : Will Hutchins dans Les maraudeurs attaquent
- 1963 : Adolfo Marsillach dans La tulipe noire
- 1963 : Elvis Presley dans L'idole d'Accapulco
- 1963 : Frank Sinatra dans Deux Têtes folles
- 1963 : Peter Sellers dans La panthère rose
- 1963 : Richard Wattis dans Hôtel international
- 1964 : Adolfo Marsillach dans Le repas des fauves
- 1964 : Audie Murphy dans La fureur des Apaches
- 1964 : Dick Van Dyke dans Mary Poppins
- 1964 : Peter Sellers dans On n'y joue qu'à deux
- 1964 : Peter Sellers dans Quand l'inspecteur s'en mèle
- 1964 : Ray Walston dans Embrasse-moi idiot
- 1964 : Stuart Whitman dans Ces merveilleux fous volants et leurs drôles de machines
- 1964 : Stuart Whitman dans Rio Couchos
- 1964 : Walter Matthau dans Mirage
- 1965 : Frank Sinatra dans L'Express du colonel von Ryan
- 1965 : Glyn Houston dans Le secret de l'île sanglante
- 1965 : Jack Lemmon dans Comment tuer votre femme
- 1965 : Terence Stamp dans L'obsédé
- 1965 : Tony Curtis dans Boeing Boeing
- 1965 : Tony Curtis dans Une vierge sur canapé
- 1965 : Tony Randall dans A.B.C. contre Hercule Poirot
- 1965 : Warren Stevens dans Planète interdite
- 1966 : Alec Guinness dans Paradisio, Hôtel du libre-échange
- 1966 : Charlie Callas dans Jerry la grande gueule
- 1966 : Dom DeLuise dans La blonde défie le FBI
- 1966 : Jerry Lewis dans Tiens bon la rampe Jerry
- 1966 : Michael Caine dans Alfie le dragueur
- 1966 : Peter Sellers dans Le renard s'évade à 3 heures
- 1967 : Peter Sellers dans Casino Royale
- 1968 : Jack Lemmon dans Un drôle de couple
- 1968 : Peter Sellers dans La Party
- 1968 : Robert Culp dans Bob et Carole, Ted et Alice
- 1968 : Vittorio Gassman dans Douze plus u]
- 1969 : Jack Nicholson dans Easy Rider
- 1969 : Michael Caine dans L'or se barre
- 1970 : Gian Maria Volonté dans Enquête sur un citoyen au-dessus de tout soupçon
- 1970 : Tony Curtis dans Les baroudeurs
- 1971 : Kirk Douglas dans Les doigts croisés
- 1972 : Duilio del Prete dans Alfredo, Alfredo
- 1972 : Jack Lemmon dans Avanti!
- 1972 : Vittorio Gassman dans Parlons femmes
- 1975 : Ian Bannen dans La Chevauchée sauvage
- 1975 : Nino Manfredi dans Nous nous sommes tant aimés
- 1975 : Peter Sellers dans Le retour de la panthère rose
- 1976 : Peter Sellers dans Quand la panthère rose s'emmèle
- 1976 : Peter Sellers dans Un cadavre au déssert
- 1978 : Peter Sellers dans La malédiction de la panthère rose
- 1979 : Tony Curtis dans Deux affreux sur le sable
- 1980 : Dabney Coleman dans Comment se débarrasser de son patron ?
- 1980 : Tony Curtis dans Le miroir se brisa

== Theatre ==
- L'Azalée
- L'École des contribuables
- Monsieur chasse
- Je l'aimais trop
- 1998 : Face à face, written by Francis Joffo, with Popeck and Jean-Pierre Castaldi
- Bon week-end monsieur Bennett
- Max et Charly
- Face à face
- Faut-il tuer le clown?
- Le charlatan
- Un suédois ou rien
- Le canard à l'orange
- Tromper n'est pas joué
- La cage aux folles
- Le dîner de cons
- Féfé de Broadway
- Monsieur Masure
- Domino de Marcel Achard avec Jean Piat, Danièle Lebrun et Guy Mottet
