= Pierre Charras =

French writer, actor and translator

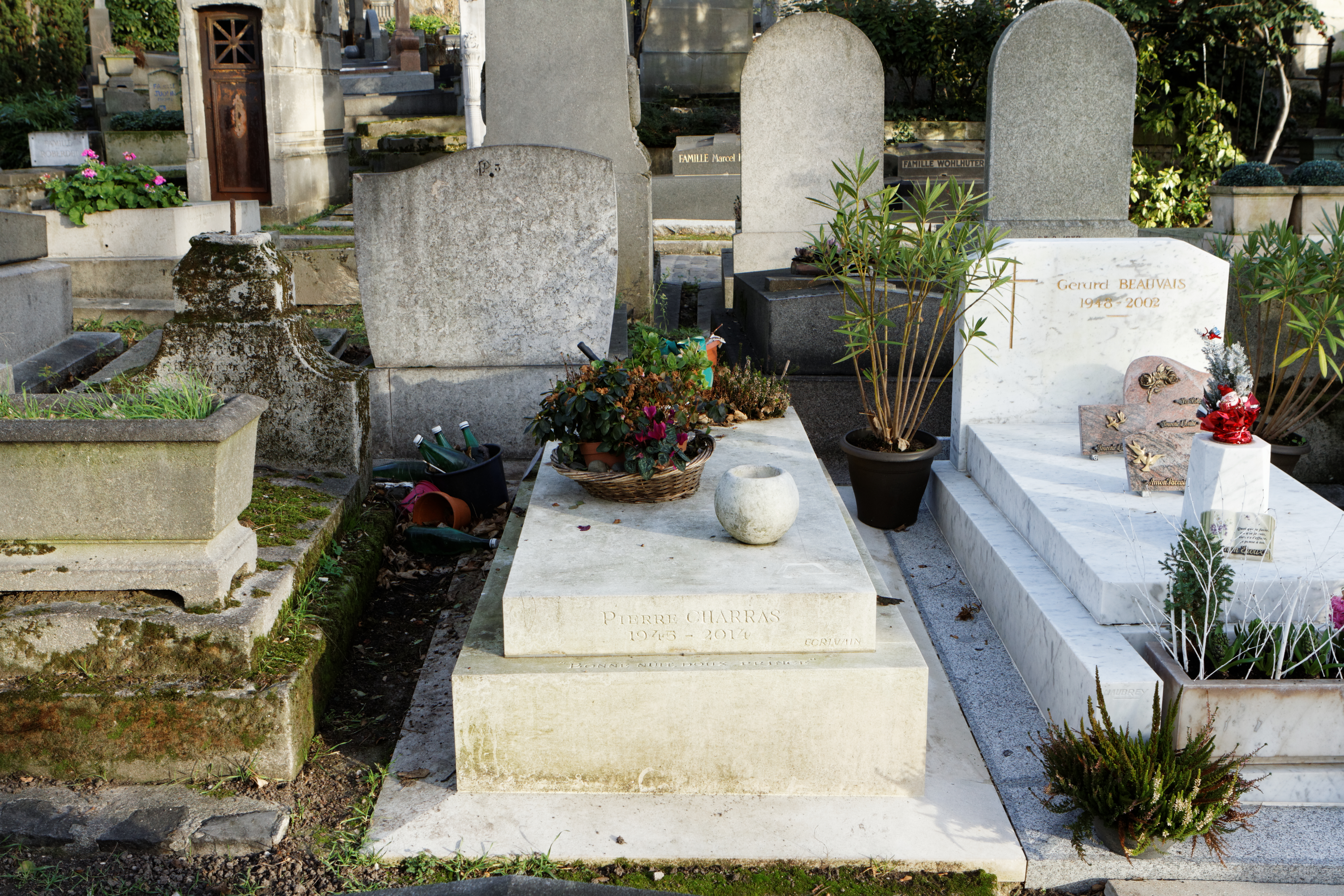
- Grave at the Père Lachaise cemetery
- Born: 19 March 1945; Saint-Étienne
- Died: 19 January 2014 (aged 68); Bagnolet
- Occupations: Writer, actor, translator

Pierre Charras (19 March 1945 – 19 January 2014) was a French writer, actor and translator from English to French. He published several novels including Monsieur Henri, Prix des Deux Magots (1995), Juste avant la nuit (1998), Comédien (2000) and Dix-neuf secondes, prix du roman FNAC 2003.

He is buried at the Père Lachaise cemetery (53rd division).

== Filmography ==
- 2004 : Pédale dure : le père
- 2002 : Adolphe : the butler
- 2002 : Sur le bout des doigts : Raymond
- 2001 : Thérèse et Léon (TV) : the banque manager
- 2000 : État gris pâle (court métrage) : a holydaymaker
- 2000 : Stardom : French intellectual in a televised debate
- 2000 : Ainsi soit-il : the judge
- 1997 : Les Vacances de l'amour (épisode Paparazzis)
- 1997 : Le Dernier Été (TV)
- 1989 : Vent de galerne : the priest
- 1984 : Première classe
- 1983 : The Bride Who Came In from the Cold : Paul's brother
- 1983 : Life Is a Bed of Roses
- 1979 : Charles et Lucie : an inspector
- 1978 : Guerres civiles en France : le zouave (segment La Semaine sanglante)

== Theatre ==
- 1973 : J'ai confiance dans mon pays by Alain Scoff, directed by the author, Théâtre Mouffetard
- 1986 : La Comédie sans titre by Italo Svevo, directed by Jacques Mauclair, Théâtre du Marais

Adaptation

- 1982 : Une fille drôlement gonflée by Ray Cooney and Gene Stone, adaptation in collaboration with Alain Scoff, directed by Francis Joffo, Théâtre de la Potinière

== Published books ==
Aux éditions du Mercure de France :
- Chez Louise, 1984
- On était heureux les dimanches, 1987
- Mémoires d'un ange, 1991, Prix Charles Oulmont 1991
- Marthe jusqu'au soir, 1993
- Monsieur Henri, 1994, Prix des Deux Magots
- Juste avant la nuit, 1998
- Comédien, 2000
- Dix-neuf secondes, 2003 (Prix du roman Fnac)
- Bonne nuit, doux prince, 2006
- Le Requiem de Franz, 2009

Other publishers :

- Deux ou trois rendez-vous, Slarkine, 1982
- Francis Bacon, le ring de la douleur, Ramsay Archimbaud, 1996; reprint Le Dilettante, 2004
- Dimanche prochain (theatre), L'Avant-scène, 1997
- La Crise de foi(e), (conte, Arléa, 1999
- Rameau le fou (theatre), Séguier Archimbaud, 2001
- Figure (theatre), L'Avant-scène, 2003
- Dix-neuf secondes (version audio du roman, lu à deux voix par Pierre Charras et Annick Roux), Lire dans le noir, 2003
- L'Oiseau (essay), Stock, 2004
