= My Three Angels (play) =

Play written by Samuel and Bella Spewack

- Written by: Samuel and Bella Spewack

Premiere
- Place premiered: Morosco Theatre, Broadway

My Three Angels is a comedy play by Samuel and Bella Spewack. The play is based on the French play La Cuisine Des Anges by Albert Husson, and is their only play that is regularly performed in repertory theater.

== Production ==
The production opened on Broadway at the Morosco Theatre on March 11, 1953, and closed on January 2, 1954 after 344 performances. The play was directed by Jose Ferrer, with Scenic Design by Boris Aronson and costumes by Lucinda Ballard.

The play is set in French Guiana around the turn of the 20th century, showing the interaction between three prisoners and a family of French colonists.

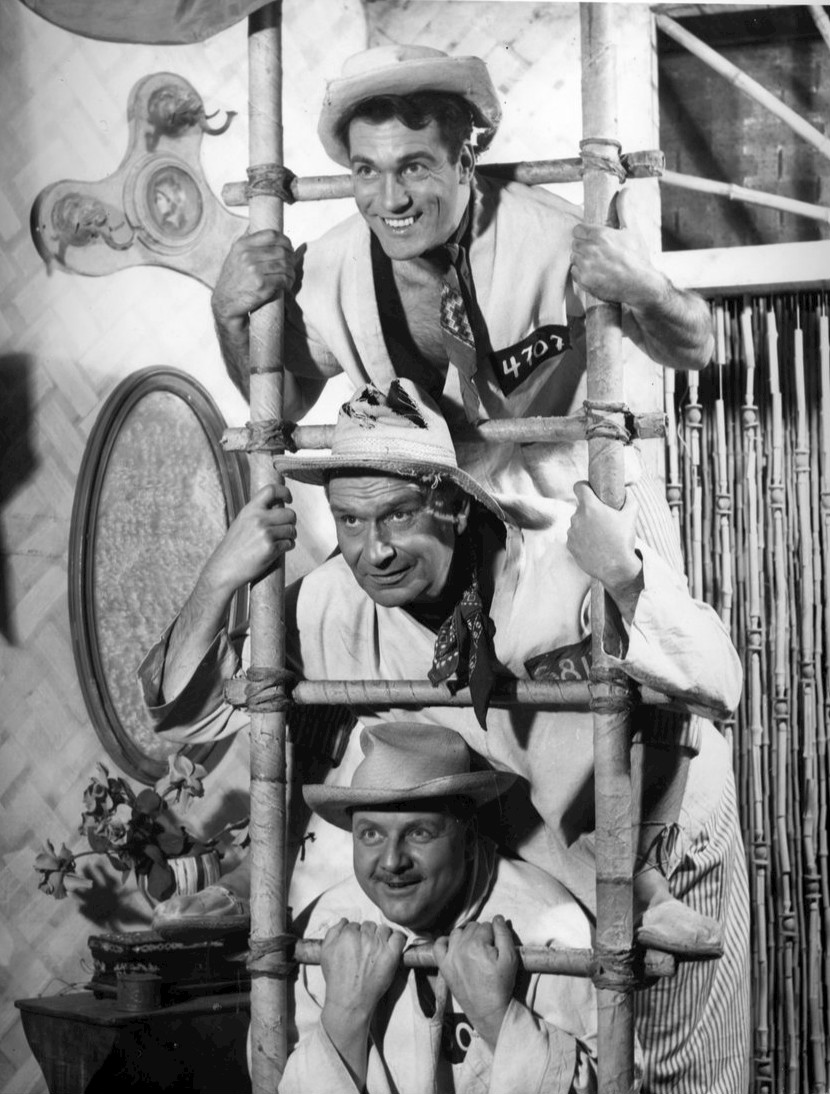
Carl Betz (Alfred), Royal Beal and Walter Slezak (Joseph) in a scene from the 1954 version of the play

== Original Broadway cast ==
- Walter Slezak as Joseph
- Joan Chandler as Marie Louise Ducotel
- Jerome Cowan as Jules
- Henry Daniell as Henri Trochard
- Carmen Mathews as Emilie Ducotel
- Robert Carroll as Paul
- Eric Fleming as Lieutenant
- Will Kuluva as Felix Ducotel
- Nan McFarland as Mme. Parole
- Darren McGavin as Alfred

== Films ==
The 1955 movie We're No Angels was based upon My Three Angels. The original play is fairly similar to the film, but the main difference is that in the play the three prisoners are not escapees; they are working on the warden's house with repairs.

The play was adapted for Australian TV in 1962.

The 1989 movie We're No Angels, starring Robert De Niro, Sean Penn, and Demi Moore uses elements of the core story as well. So does the 1993 movie Ore-tachi wa tenshi janai 俺達は天使じゃない by Takashi Miike, starring Ren Ōsugi, Junji Inagawa and Makiko Kuno.

The 1989 version changes the setting to Great Depression era USA set in the 1930s.
