= Bella and Samuel Spewack =

American stage and screenwriter duo

Samuel Spewack
- Born: 16 September 1899; Ukraine
- Died: 14 October 1971 (aged 72)
- Education: Columbia College
- Spouse(s): Bella Cohen (1922–1971, his death)

Bella Cohen
- Born: 25 March 1899; Bucharest, Romania
- Died: 27 April 1990 (aged 91)
- Education: Washington Irving High School
- Spouse(s): Samuel Spewack (1922–1971, his death)

Bella (25 March 1899 – 27 April 1990) and Samuel Spewack (16 September 1899 – 14 October 1971) were a writing team.

Samuel, who also directed many of their plays, was born in Bachmut, Ukraine. He attended Stuyvesant High School in New York City and then received his degree from Columbia College.

== Lives and careers ==
The oldest of three children of a single mother, Bella Cohen was born in Bucharest, Romania and with her family emigrated to the Lower East Side of Manhattan when she was a child. After graduation from Washington Irving High School, she worked as a journalist for socialist and pacifist newspapers such as the New York Call. Her work drew attention from Samuel, working as a reporter for The World, and the couple married in 1922. Shortly afterwards, they departed for Moscow, where they worked as news correspondents for the next four years.

After returning to the United States, they settled in New Hope, Pennsylvania. In the latter part of the decade, Samuel wrote several novels, including Mon Paul, The Skyscraper Murder, and The Murder in the Gilded Cage (which he adapted into the film The Secret Witness), on his own, while the pair collaborated on plays. The two wrote several plays that made it to Broadway, including 1932's Clear All Wires. Although that play only ran for 93 performances, they adapted it for a 1933 film. It later became the basis of the hit 1938 Cole Porter musical Leave It to Me!, for which the Spewacks wrote the book and which Sam directed.

The Spewacks continued to write screenplays throughout the 1930s, earning an Academy Award nomination for Best Original Story for My Favorite Wife in 1940. The 1933 film The Solitaire Man was based on their 1927 play of the same name. They also penned a remake of Grand Hotel, entitled Week-End at the Waldorf (1945), which starred Ginger Rogers. In the summer of 1943, Sam accompanied Lt. Burgess Meredith to England to co-write the U.S. Army training film A Welcome to Britain, which educated arriving troops on cultural differences between Americans and the British.

The Spewacks were separated in 1948 when they were approached to write the book for Kiss Me, Kate, which centered on a once-married couple of thespians who use the stage on which they're performing as a battling ground. Bella initially began working with composer-lyricist Cole Porter on her own, but eventually turned to Sam to collaborate with her, and the Spewacks completed the project together. It yielded each of them two Tony Awards, one for Best Musical, the other for Best Author of a Musical. Kiss Me, Kate proved to be their most successful work.

Perhaps their best known straight play was My Three Angels, which they adapted from the French play La Cuisine des Anges by Albert Husson. The French play was adapted as the 1955 Michael Curtiz film We're No Angels, which was later remade in 1989 by Neil Jordan. The Spewacks sued Paramount over the 1955 film, which purported to be based on the Husson original rather than their adaptation. As "H.H.T." wrote in the New York Times review of the Curtiz film, "Oddly enough, the new Paramount comedy, We're No Angels, gives sole credit to the Gallic original, then stalks the Spewacks almost scene by scene, without, alas, most of the fun."

In 1965, Sam collaborated with Frank Loesser on a musical adaptation of the 1961 Spewack play Once There Was a Russian. Entitled Pleasures and Palaces, it closed following its Detroit run and never opened on Broadway.

Bella was a successful publicist for the Camp Fire Girls and Girl Scouts of the USA, and claimed to have introduced the idea of selling cookies for the latter as a means of raising revenue for the organization.

A Letter to Sam from Bella, a one-act play by Broadway director Aaron Frankel, is based on the Spewacks' personal papers from the Theater Arts Collection of Columbia University's Rare Book and Manuscript Library.

== Additional Broadway credits ==
- The War Song, 1928
- Poppa, 1928
- Clear All Wires, 1932
- Spring Song, 1934
- Boy Meets Girl, 1935
- Leave It to Me!, 1938
- Miss Swan Expects, 1939
- Woman Bites Dog, 1946
- Two Blind Mice, 1949
- The Golden State, 1950
- My Three Angels, 1953
- Festival, 1955
- Once There Was a Russian, 1961
