= Pleasures and Palaces =

Pleasures and Palaces is a musical with a book by Frank Loesser and Sam Spewack and music and lyrics by Loesser. It is based on Spewack's flop 1961 play Once There Was a Russian and takes its title from the opening lyrics of the 1823 song "Home, Sweet Home": "Mid pleasures and palaces though we may roam, Be it ever so humble, there's no place like home."

== Plot summary ==
In this comic look at actual historical events, John Paul Jones enters into the service of the Empress Catherine II of Russia in 1788, specifically to fight the Turks and recapture Constantinople for Russia, and becomes involved in political intrigue and romantic complications. Catherine is in love with Grigori Alexandrovich Potemkin, who is enamored with the murderous Sura, who finds herself torn between Potemkin and Jones.

== Productions ==
The Broadway-bound production, directed and choreographed by Bob Fosse, opened on March 11, 1965, at the Fisher Theatre in Detroit. The cast included Hy Hazell, Alfred Marks, Phyllis Newman, and John McMartin. The musical closed out-of-town and was not produced on Broadway.

The musical was produced by the Lyric Stage of Irving, Texas, in January 2013. The original orchestrations (by Philip J. Lang) were used, and the cast was headed by Christopher Carl, Luann Anderson, Bryant Martin, and Danielle Estes. Direction and choreography were by Ann Nieman.

== Reception ==
The Detroit Press described it as "lesser Loesser." The Detroit Free Press wrote: "It's a Rolls-Royce of a show, a magnificent combination of artful scenery, lively choreography, and engaging people. But there's no gas in the Rolls-Royce tank," and Variety called it "disappointing." Cy Feuer and Abe Burrows were called in to help with revisions, and Fosse was willing to invest his own money in order to get the production to Boston, but after its closing on April 10, Loesser cancelled the rest of the tryout tour and the Broadway opening.

== Song list ==
- Ah, To Be Home Again
- Barabanchik
- Far, Far Away
- Hoorah For Jones
- I Hear Bells
- My Lover Is A Scoundrel
- Neither The Time
- Pleasures & Palaces
- The Sins of Sura
- Tears Of Joy
- Thunder And Lightning
- To Marry
- To Your Health
- In Your Eyes
- Truly Loved
