= Gaspard André =

French architect

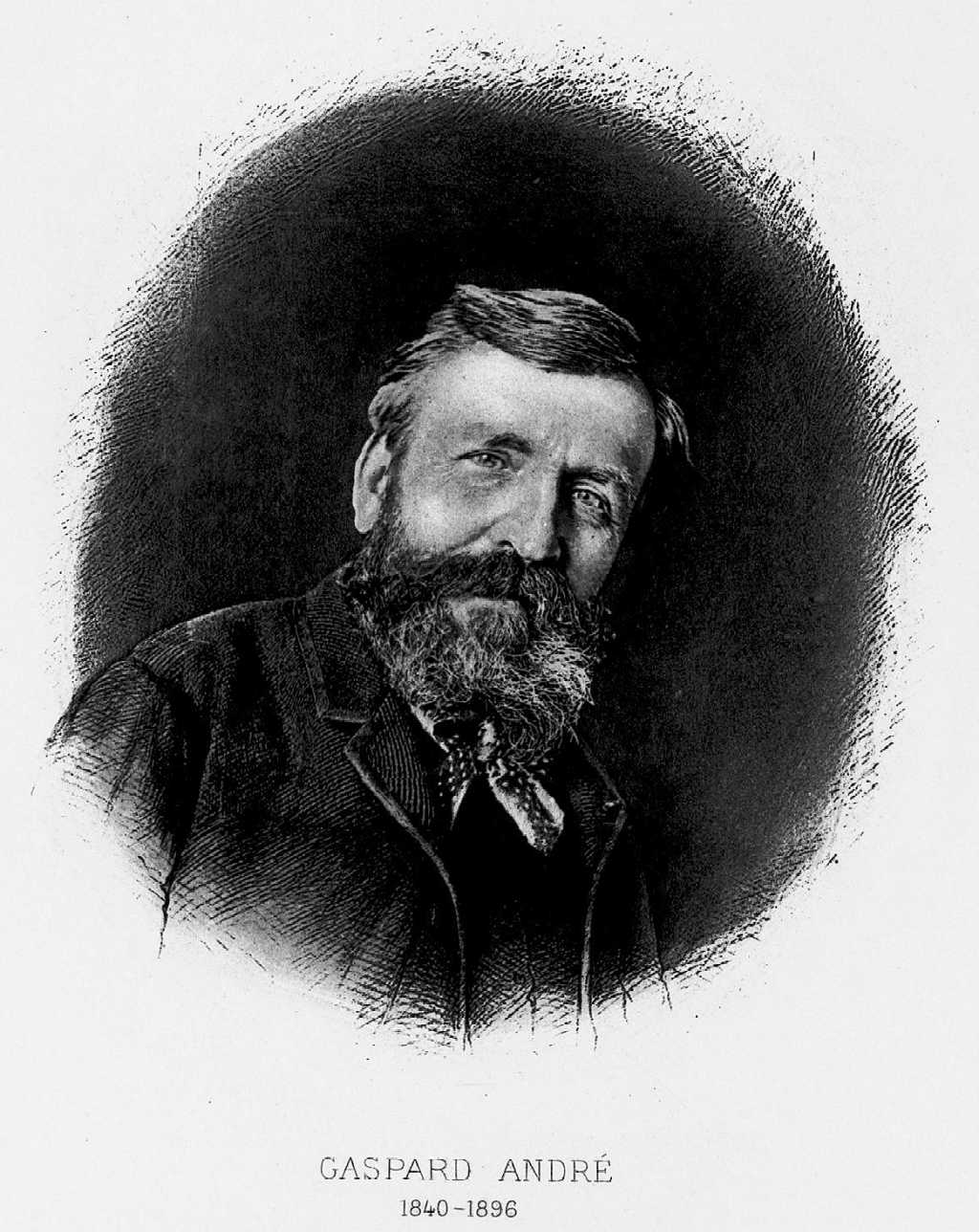
Gaspard André

Gaspard André (16 March 1840 in Lyon - 12 February 1896 in Cannes) was a French architect, best known as the designer of the Theater of the Place des Célestins, the Fountain of the Place des Jacobins and the Grand Temple de Lyon in Lyon, the city hall of Neuilly-sur-Seine and the Palace of Rumine in Lausanne.

== Bibliography ==
- Aynard, Édouard, L'œuvre de Gaspard André, Lyon : A. Storck, 1898. OCLC 5107808
- Bruyère, Gérard and Chiron, Noëlle, Gaspard André : architecte lyonnais, 1840-1896, Lyon : Archives Municipales, 1996. ISBN 978-2-908949-12-4
