= Francis Joffo =

French actor, writer and theater director

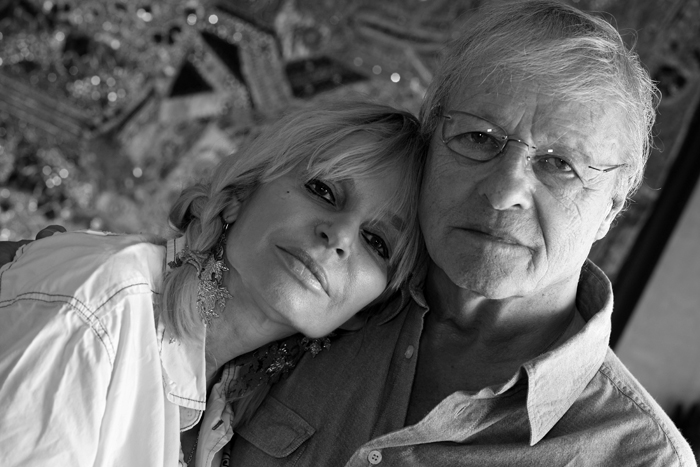
Dominique et Francis

Francis Joffo is a French actor, writer and theater director who essentially played for television, particularly in the Au théâtre ce soir program which made him famous. He is also a dramatist and playwright.

== Filmography ==
- 1976 : Cours après moi que je t'attrape de Robert Pouret
- 1985 : L'amour propre ne le reste jamais très longtemps de Martin Veyron

== Television ==
=== TV films ===
- 1973 : Pour Vermeer by Jacques Pierre
- 1977 : The Merchant of Venice
- 1983 : Le Tartuffe by Molière, directed by Marlène Bertin

=== TV serials ===
- 1964 : Commandant X
- 1969 : Café du square
- 1977 : Banlieue Sud-Est

=== Au théâtre ce soir ===
- 1968 : Le Minotaure by Marcel Aymé, mise-en-scène Jean Le Poulain, directed by Pierre Sabbagh, Théâtre Marigny
- 1970 : Le Bourgeois gentilhomme by Molière, mise-en-scène Jean Le Poulain, directed by Pierre Sabbagh, Théâtre Marigny
- 1971 : Fric-Frac by Édouard Bourdet, mise-en-scène Jean Le Poulain, directed by Pierre Sabbagh, Théâtre Marigny
- 1971 : Zoé de Jean Marsan, mise-en-scène by the author, directed by Pierre Sabbagh, Théâtre Marigny
- 1971 : De doux dingues by Joseph Carole, mise-en-scène Jean Le Poulain, directed by Georges Folgoas, Théâtre Marigny
- 1973 : Twelfth Night de William Shakespeare, mise-en-scène Jean Le Poulain, directed by Georges Folgoas, Théâtre Marigny
- 1973 : La Reine blanche by Pierre Barillet and Jean-Pierre Gredy, mise-en-scène Jacques Sereys, directed by Georges Folgoas, Théâtre Marigny
- 1973 : Pétrus by Marcel Achard, mise-en-scène Jean Le Poulain, directed by Georges Folgoas, Théâtre Marigny
- 1975 : Le noir te va si bien by Jean Marsan after Saul O'Hara, mise-en-scène Jean Le Poulain, directed by Pierre Sabbagh, théâtre Édouard VII
- 1977 : Le Faiseur by Honoré de Balzac, mise-en-scène Pierre Franck, directed by Pierre Sabbagh, Théâtre Marigny
- 1978 : Le Misanthrope et l'Auvergnat by Eugène Labiche and Marc Michel, mise-en-scène Jean Le Poulain, directed by Pierre Sabbagh, Théâtre Marigny
- 1982 : Le Caveau de famille by Pierre Chesnot, mise-en-scène Francis Joffo, directed by Pierre Sabbagh, Théâtre Marigny
- 1982 : Allo Hélène by Ray Cooney and Gene Stone, mise-en-scène adaptation Alain Scoff and Pierre Charras
- 1984 : Le Malade imaginaire by Molière, mise-en-scène Jean Le Poulain, directed by Pierre Sabbagh, Théâtre Marigny

== Theater ==
=== Author ===
- 1995 : Quelle famille !
- 1996 : Vacances de rêve
- 1998 : Face à face
- 1999 : Le Gros Lot
- 2003 : Quel cinéma !
- Coups de foudre
- La Soupière

=== Stage ===
- 1957 : Pericles, Prince of Tyre by William Shakespeare, directed by René Dupuy, Théâtre de l'Ambigu
- 1961 : Un certain monsieur Blot by Robert Rocca, directed by René Dupuy, Théâtre Gramont
- 1963 : C'est ça qui m'flanqu'le cafard by Arthur L. Kopit, directed by Jean Le Poulain, Théâtre des Bouffes-Parisiens
- 1964 : Têtes de rechange by Jean-Victor Pellerin, directed by Jean Le Poulain, Théâtre des Bouffes-Parisiens
- 1964 : Le Minotaure by Marcel Aymé, directed by Jean Le Poulain, Théâtre des Bouffes-Parisiens
- 1964 : Moumou by Jean de Létraz, directed by Jean Le Poulain, Théâtre des Bouffes-Parisiens
- 1965 : Pourquoi pas Vamos by Georges Conchon, directed by Jean Mercure, théâtre Édouard VII
- 1965 : Les Filles by Jean Marsan, directed by Jean Le Poulain, théâtre Édouard VII
- 1967 : Interdit au public by Jean Marsan, directed by Jean Le Poulain, Théâtre Saint-Georges
- 1968 : Interdit au public by Jean Marsan, directed by Jean Le Poulain, Théâtre Saint-Georges
- 1969 : Interdit au public by Jean Marsan, directed by Jean Le Poulain, Théâtre des Célestins
- 1969 : Le Bourgeois gentilhomme by Molière, directed by Jean Le Poulain, Festival d'Arles
- 1970 : Pourquoi m'avez-vous posée sur le palier ? by Catherine Peter Scott, directed by Jean-Pierre Grenier, Théâtre Saint-Georges
- 1971 : La Soupière by Robert Lamoureux, directed by Robert Lamoureux & Francis Joffo, théâtre Édouard VII
- 1972 : Le Noir te va si bien by Jean Marsan, directed by Jean Le Poulain, Théâtre Antoine
- 1973 : Le Bourgeois gentilhomme by Molière, directed by Jean Le Poulain, Théâtre Mogador
- 1974 : Le Bourgeois gentilhomme by Molière, directed by Jean Le Poulain, Mai de Versailles
- 1974 : Le Mari, la Femme et la Mort by André Roussin, directed by the author, Théâtre des Célestins, tournée Herbert-Karsenty
- 1976 : Voyez-vous ce que je vois ? by Ray Cooney and John Chapman, directed by Jean Le Poulain, Théâtre de la Michodière
- 1982 : Une fille drôlement gonflée by Ray Cooney and Gene Stone, directed by Francis Joffo, Théâtre de la Potinière
- 1991 : À vos souhaits by Pierre Chesnot, directed by Francis Joffo, Théâtre Antoine
- 1993 : L'Amour foot by Robert Lamoureux, directed by Francis Joffo, Théâtre Antoine
- 1996 : Vacances de rêve by Francis Joffo, directed by the author, Théâtre du Palais Royal
- 1998 : Face à face by Francis Joffo, directed by the author, Théâtre du Palais-Royal
- 2001 : Quelle famille ! by Francis Joffo, directed by Francis Joffo, Théâtre Saint-Georges, Théâtre du Palais-Royal
- 2008 : Vacances de rêve by Francis Joffo, directed by the author

=== Theatre director ===
- 1965 : Copains Clopant by Christian Kursner, Théâtre Charles de Rochefort, Théâtre du Gymnase
- 1966 : Ange pur by Gaby Bruyère, théâtre Édouard VII
- 1968 : Le Grand Zèbre by Jean-Jacques Bricaire and Maurice Lasaygues, Théâtre des Variétés
- 1971 : La Soupière de Robert Lamoureux, mise-en-scène with Robert Lamoureux, théâtre Édouard VII
- 1974 : Le Charlatan de Robert Lamoureux, Théâtre des Bouffes-Parisiens
- 1977 : Divorce à la française by Bernard Alazraki, Théâtre des Nouveautés
- 1978 : La Cuisine des anges by Albert Husson, Théâtre des Célestins
- 1979 : Les Vignes du seigneur by Robert de Flers and Francis de Croisset, Théâtre des Célestins
- 1982 : Une fille drôlement gonflée by Ray Cooney and Gene Stone, Théâtre de la Potinière
- 1987 : La Taupe by Robert Lamoureux, Théâtre Antoine
- 1987 : Le Pyromane by Jean-Marie Pélaprat, Petit Odéon
- 1988 : Quelle famille ! by Francis Joffo, Théâtre Fontaine
- 1989 : Adélaïde 90 by Robert Lamoureux, Théâtre Antoine
- 1991 : À vos souhaits by Pierre Chesnot, Théâtre Antoine
- 1993 : L'Amour foot by Robert Lamoureux, Théâtre Antoine
- 1998 : Face à face by Francis Joffo, Théâtre du Palais-Royal
- 1996 : Vacances de rêve by Francis Joffo, Théâtre du Palais Royal
- 1996 : Si je peux me permettre by Robert Lamoureux, Théâtre des Nouveautés
- 1999 : Si je peux me permettre by Robert Lamoureux, Théâtre Saint-Georges
- 2001 : Quelle famille ! by Francis Joffo, Théâtre Saint-Georges, Théâtre du Palais-Royal
- 2001 : La Soupière by Robert Lamoureux, Théâtre Comédia
- 2002 : Le Charlatan by Robert Lamoureux, Théâtre Saint-Georges
- 2003 : Quel cinéma ! by Francis Joffo, Théâtre du Palais-Royal
- 2004 : The Boors by Carlo Goldoni, Théâtre Saint-Georges
- 2008 : Vacances de rêve by Francis Joffo
