= Jean Barbier =

French-Basque author (1875 – 1931)

Jean Barbier (9 July 1875 – 31 October 1931) was a French-Basque author.

== Life ==
He participated in the creation and discussion of the Euskaltzaindia, the Academy of the Basque language.

== Works ==
He contributed regularly to the weekly Navarro-labourdin Eskualduna. He reviewed for Gure Herria from the time of its founding in 1921. His first publications were translations of religious works: Ama Birjina Lurden: les merveilles de Massabielle [Friend Bikina Lurden: the Virgin Mary of Lourdes] (1920) was based on a French work by the Abbé Prévost.

In 1926, he published a novel, Piarres, with a preface Oxobi (Jules Moulier), which was pre-published in Gure Herria. Printed to 400 copies, it quickly sold out. The second part of Piarres was published in 1930. The novel has been called "perhaps the most valuable creative description of Basque life at the turn of the [20th] century that we have".

== Bibliography ==
- Supazter Chokoan, 1925, A. Foltzer
- Ichtorio-Michterio, 1929, Bayonne
- Piarres, 2 vol. (1926-1930)
- Antxitxarburu-ko buhamiak (1971, Ikas)
- Ixtorio-mixtorio ipuin-mipuinak (1990, Labayru)
- Sorgiñak. Bi zatikiko Antzerkia (1931, Leizaola)
