= Albert Husson =

French playwright and theatre director

- Born: 3 August 1912; Lyon
- Died: 16 December 1978 (aged 66)
- Occupations: Dramatist, theatre director

Albert Husson (3 August 1912 – 16 December 1978) was a French playwright and theatre director.

On 26 January 1968, Jean Meyer and Albert Husson were both appointed directors of the Théâtre des Célestins in Lyon, which produced numerous adaptations for the theater as well as television. Albert Husson, former secretary general of the Théâtre des Célestins 1944–1959, was specifically responsible for the administrative management, while John Meyer was artistic director.

Albert Husson was a member of the Académie des Sciences, Belles-Lettres et Arts de Lyon.

== Comedian ==
- 1936: Romance by Robert de Flers and Francis de Croisset after Edward Sheldon, Théâtre des Célestins
- 1937: The Merry Widow by Robert de Flers and Gaston Arman de Caillavet, music by Franz Lehár, Théâtre des Célestins

== Works ==
=== Adaptator ===
- 1959: La Copie de Madame Aupic after Gian-Carlo Menotti, directed by Daniel Ceccaldi, Théâtre Fontaine, Théâtre des Célestins
- 1962: Flora by Fabio Mauri and Franco Brusati, directed by Jules Dassin, Théâtre des Variétés
- 1963: La Crécelle by Charles dyer, directed by Michel Fagadau, Théâtre de la Gaîté-Montparnasse
- 1965: Liola by Luigi Pirandello, directed by Bernard Jenny, Théâtre du Vieux-Colombier
- 1965: Le Mal de Test by Ira Wallach, directed by Pierre Dux, Comédie des Champs-Élysées
- 1965: Le Jour de la tortue by Pietro Garinei and Sandro Giovannini, directed by the authors and Robert Manuel, Théâtre Marigny
- 1966: Le Théâtre de la jeunesse : L'homme qui a perdu son ombre after the tale Peter Schlemihl by Adelbert von Chamisso, TV director Marcel Cravenne, first broadcast: 16/07/1966
- 1966: Comment naît un scénario de cinéma by Cesare Zavattini, adaptation with Hubert Gignoux, directed by Hubert Gignoux, Théâtre de l'Athénée
- 1968: Adieu Berthe by Allen Boretz and John Murray, adaptation with Francis Blanche, directed by Jacques Charon, Théâtre des Bouffes Parisiens
- 1968: Le Soldat inconnu et sa femme by Peter Ustinov, directed by the author, Théâtre des Célestins
- 1969: Le monde est ce qu'il est by Alberto Moravia, directed by Pierre Franck, Théâtre des Célestins, Théâtre de l'Œuvre
- 1969: Cash-Cash by Alistair Foot and Anthony Marriott, directed by Michel Vocoret, Théâtre Fontaine
- 1971: Le Dieu Kurt by Alberto Moravia, directed by Pierre Franck, Théâtre des Célestins, Théâtre Michel
- 1971: Joyeuse Pomme by Jack Pulman, directed by Jacques Rosny, Théâtre des Célestins
- 1975: Un mois à la campagne by Ivan Turgenev, directed by Jean Meyer, Théâtre des Célestins
- 1976: Hedda Gabler by Henrik Ibsen, directed by Jean Meyer, Théâtre des Célestins
- 1976: Qui est qui ? by Keith Waterhouse and Willis Hall, Théâtre Moderne
- 1978: Le Colonel Chabert after Honoré de Balzac, directed by Jean Meyer, Théâtre des Célestins
- 1984: La Mal de test by Ira Wallach, directed by Raymond Gérôme, Comédie des Champs-Élysées
- 1987: Drôle de couple by Neil Simon, directed by Jean-Luc Moreau, Théâtre des Célestins

=== Author ===
- 1943: L'Immortel Saint-Germainchance, directed by Charles Gantillon, Théâtre des Célestins
- 1947: Monsieur Providence, play in 2 acts and one prologue, Théâtre Gramont
- 1948: Jardin français dialogues, directed by Julien Bertheau, Théâtre des Célestins
- 1948: La Ligne de chance, directed by Charles Gantillon, Théâtre des Célestins
- 1952: La Cuisine des anges, directed by Christian-Gérard, Théâtre du Vieux-Colombier (Film We're No Angels, 1955)
- 1953: Les Pavés du Ciel, directed by Christian-Gérard, Théâtre des Célestins
- 1956: La Nuit du 4 août, directed by Christian-Gérard, Théâtre Édouard VII
- 1956: L'Ombre du cavalier, directed by Julien Bertheau, Théâtre des Célestins
- 1957: Les Pigeons de Venise, directed by Louis Ducreux, Théâtre des Célestins, Théâtre Michel
- 1958: La Grande Revue du bimillénaire, in collaboration with Jacques Bodoin, Erge, R. Moreau, Xavier Salomon, Berier, Migy, André Marcel, Théâtre des Célestins
- 1958: Une leçon de chant, one-act play, directed by Charles Gantillon, Théâtre des Célestins
- 1958: Le Valet de quatre cœurs after Servitore de due padroni by Carlo Goldoni, directed by Charles Gantillon, Théâtre des Célestins
- 1961: L'Impromptu des collines, directed by Julien Bertheau, Théâtre du Tertre, Théâtre des Célestins
- 1961: Claude de Lyon, directed by Julien Bertheau, Théâtre du Tertre, Théâtre des Célestins
- 1963: Le Système Fabrizzi, directed by Sacha Pitoëff, Théâtre Moderne
- 1963: Le Théâtre de la jeunesse: La Surprenante Invention du Professeur Delalune, TV director Marcel Cravenne, première diffusion : 30/11/1963
- 1964: Devant que les chandelles…, Théâtre des Célestins
- 1965: Le Théâtre de la jeunesse: Sans-souci ou Le Chef-d'œuvre de Vaucanson, TV director Jean-Pierre Decourt, first broadcast 22 May 1965
- 1966: La Bouteille à l'encre, directed by Jean-Pierre Grenier, Théâtre Saint-Georges
- 1969: La Paille humide, directed by Michel Roux, Théâtre de la Michodière
- 1972: Le Plaisir conjugal after Lysistrata by Aristophane, Théâtre de la Madeleine
- 1973: Le Paysan parvenu after Marivaux, directed by Jean Meyer, Théâtre des Célestins
- 1974: Bonne Fête Amandine, directed by Jacques Mauclair, Théâtre des Célestins

=== Artistic collaboration ===
- 1978: Boule de Suif after Guy de Maupassant, directed by Jean Meyer, Théâtre des Célestins

== Prizes and honours ==
- 1947: Grand Prix de la Société des Auteurs for Monsieur Providence
